= Scampolo (1941 film) =

1941 film directed by Nunzio Malasomma

- Directed by: Nunzio Malasomma
- Written by: Dario Niccodemi (play); Nunzio Malasomma
- Starring: Lilia Silvi; Amedeo Nazzari; Carlo Romano
- Cinematography: Tino Santoni
- Edited by: Gabriele Varriale
- Music by: Eldo Di Lazzaro
- Production company: Excelsa Film
- Distributed by: Minerva Film
- Release date: 2 October 1941
- Running time: 78 minutes
- Country: Italy
- Language: Italian

Scampolo is a 1941 Italian comedy film directed by Nunzio Malasomma and starring Lilia Silvi, Amedeo Nazzari and Carlo Romano. The story is based on a play by Dario Niccodemi which has been adapted for the screen a number of times.

The film's sets were designed by the art director Ottavio Scotti. It was shot at the Palatino Studios in Rome.

== Cast ==
- Lilia Silvi as Scampolo
- Amedeo Nazzari as Tito Sacchi
- Carlo Romano as Gerardo Bernini
- Luisa Garella as Franca
- Nice Raineri as Giulia Bernini
- Giacomo Almirante as Il maestro Giglioli
- Guglielmo Barnabò as Fallotti
- Mario Siletti as Gastone
- Anita Durante as La proprietaria della stireria
- Arturo Bragaglia as Ernesto
- Gildo Bocci as Il fioraio
- Toscano Giuntini as Il portiere
- Armandina Bianchi as Una stiratrice
- Lina Tartara Minora

== Bibliography ==
- Piero Pruzzo & Enrico Lancia. Amedeo Nazzari. Gremese Editore, 1983.
