= Lively Teresa =

1943 film

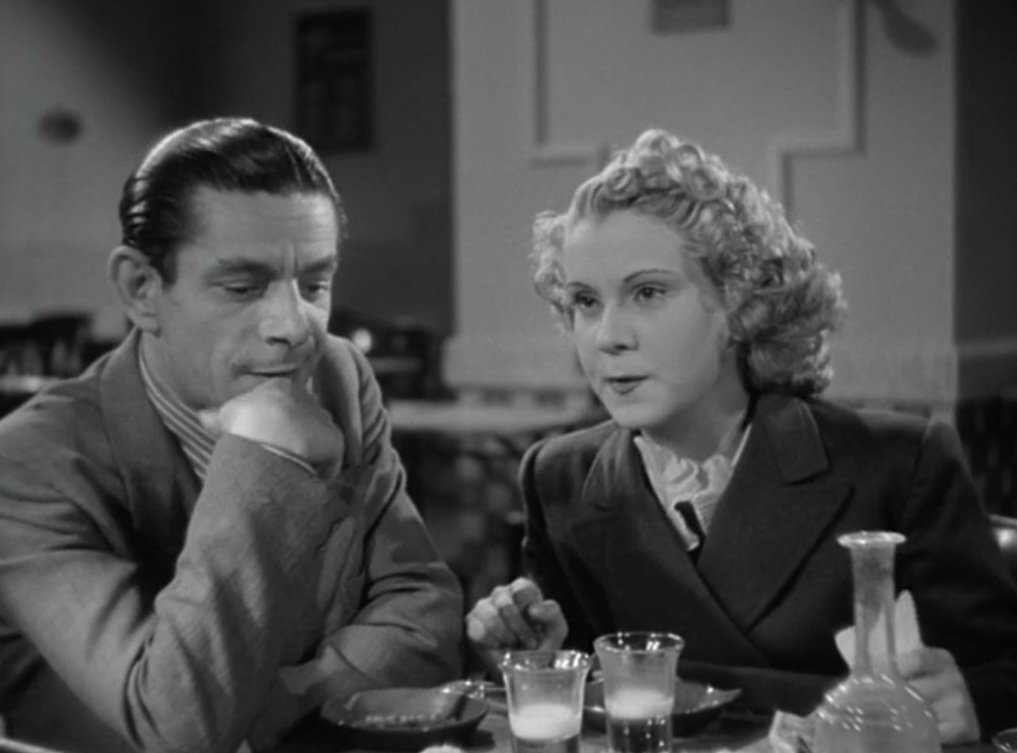
- Tino Scotti & Lilia Silvi
- Directed by: Mario Mattoli
- Written by: Mario Mattoli
- Starring: Lilia Silvi; Roberto Villa; Carlo Ninchi
- Cinematography: Charles Suin; Ugo Lombardi
- Edited by: Fernando Tropea
- Music by: Gioacchino Angelo
- Production companies: Excelsa Film; Regina Film
- Distributed by: Minerva Film
- Release date: 4 September 1943
- Running time: 85 minutes
- Country: Italy
- Language: Italian

Lively Teresa (Italian: La vispa Teresa) is a 1943 Italian "white-telephones" comedy film directed by Mario Mattoli and starring Lilia Silvi, Roberto Villa and Carlo Ninchi. It was produced in the style of the White Telephone comedies popular during the Fascist era.

The film was only fully released following the Liberation of Rome, alongside other equally innocuous films such as The Innocent Casimiro. This provoked criticism from supporters of the emerging neorealist movement who wanted to promote what they regarded as more innovative films, while the major film companies such as Lux Film and Minverva preferred more populist offerings.

It was shot at the Palatino Studios in Rome. The film's sets were designed by the art directors Piero Filippone and Mario Rappini.

== Plot ==
A wealthy engineer is disturbed when he discovers that his son Alberto has fallen in love with an ambitious manicurist Luisa. He arranges for him to go on holiday to Venice while he tries to buy off Luisa. However, Luisa has secretly accompanied Alberto, and has got her friend Teresa to take her place at the beauty parlour. Alberto's parents mistake her for Luisa, and complications ensue.

== Cast ==
- Lilia Silvi as Teresa
- Antonio Gandusio as Antonio, suo zio
- Vera Carmi as Luisa, la manicure
- Roberto Villa as Alberto Mari
- Carlo Ninchi as Carlo Mari, suo padre
- Giuditta Rissone as Matilde Mari, madre di Alberto
- Tino Scotti as Albertaccio
- Aldo Silvani as Il colonello Rossi
- Cesare Fantoni as Il maggiordomo di casa Mari
- Achille Majeroni as Un collabotatore del signor Mari
- Edda Soligo as La segretaria del Signor Mari
- Carlo Lombardi as Il commendatore
- Carlo Campanini as Un cliente dal barbiere
- Peppino Spadaro as L'usciere siciliano
- Leopoldo Valentini as Un cliente al bar

== Bibliography ==
- Gundle, Stephen. Mussolini's Dream Factory: Film Stardom in Fascist Italy. Berghahn Books, 2013.
