= Giuseppe Varni =

Polish-born Italian stage and film actor

- Born: Józef Bruno Winawer; 20 March 1902; Warsaw, Russian Empire
- Died: 25 February 1965 (aged 62); Rome, Lazio, Italy
- Other name: Jozef Bruno Winawer
- Occupation: Actor
- Years active: 1940-1955 (film)
- Relatives: Soava Gallone (sister); Carmine Gallone (brother-in-law); Regina Winawer (mother)

Giuseppe Varni (born Józef Bruno Winawer; 20 March 1902 – 25 February 1965) was a Polish-born Italian stage and film actor.

== Selected filmography ==
- Oltre l'amore (1940) - Il commissario
- Amami Alfredo (1940) - (uncredited)
- Eternal Melodies (1940) - Un detrattore
- Maddalena, Zero for Conduct (1940) - Amilcare Bondani, il bidello
- L'orizzonte dipinto (1941) - Un pagliaccio
- The Secret Lover (1941) - Il portiere dell'albergo
- First Love (1941) - L'editore Wolkoff
- The Two Orphans (1942) - Picard, il cameriere
- La signorina (1942)
- Luisa Sanfelice (1942)
- The Woman of Sin (1942)
- Odessa in Flames (1942) - Lo scrivone
- Harlem (1943) - Un gangster
- La danza del fuoco (1943)
- Sad Loves (1943) - Il cavaliere Rublo
- Sogno d'amore (1943)
- Finalmente sì (1944)
- Rigoletto (1946) - Count of Ceprano
- Eugenia Grandet (1946) - Mr. Des Grassins
- Before Him All Rome Trembled (1946) - Stagehand
- Biraghin (1946)
- La grande strada (1947)
- Fire Over the Sea (1947) - Matteo La Spina
- Black Magic (1949) - Boehmer
- The Force of Destiny (1950) - Il pellegrino caritatevole
- Night Taxi (1950) - Maggiordomo
- La grande rinuncia (1951)
- Quo Vadis (1951) - Hairdresser (uncredited)
- Messalina (1951) - Pallante
- We're Dancing on the Rainbow (1952) - Bachmeier
- La colpa di una madre (1952)
- House of Ricordi (1954) - Monti
- Don Camillo's Last Round (1955) - Un démocrate-chrétien (uncredited) (final film role)

== Bibliography ==
- Anile, Alberto. Orson Welles in Italy. Indiana University Press, 2013.
