= Biraghin =

1946 film directed by Carmine Gallone

- Directed by: Carmine Gallone
- Written by: Ugo Betti; Mario Brancacci; Arnaldo Fraccaroli; Anton Giulio Majano; Cesare Zavattini
- Based on: Biraghin by Arnaldo Fraccaroli
- Produced by: Livio Pavanelli
- Starring: Lilia Silvi; Andrea Checchi; Lauro Gazzolo
- Cinematography: Anchise Brizzi
- Edited by: Eraldo Da Roma
- Music by: Eldo Di Lazzaro
- Production company: Excelsa Film
- Distributed by: Minerva Film
- Release date: 1946
- Running time: 84 minutes
- Country: Italy
- Language: Italian

Biraghin is a 1946 Italian comedy film directed by Carmine Gallone and starring Lilia Silvi, Andrea Checchi and Lauro Gazzolo. It was based on a play of the same title by Arnaldo Fraccaroli. It was shot at the Scalera Studios in Rome. The film's sets were designed by the art director Gastone Medin.

== Synopsis ==
Biraghin an aspiring dancer is a student at the La Scala Theatre School. When a prominent performer falls ill Biraghin takes her place and becomes a huge success. Her newfound fame goes to her head as she is courted by three suitors. However she realises she truly loves a journalist who showed genuine interest in her when she was still an unknown.

== Cast ==
- Lilia Silvi as Biraghin
- Andrea Checchi as Il Giornalista
- Paolo Stoppa as Osvaldo Lanza di Robbio
- Lauro Gazzolo as Padre di Biraghin
- Mario Pisu as Moreno
- Edda Albertini as Besana
- Maurizio D'Ancora as Paolo
- Aristide Baghetti as Maestro Grassi
- Guglielmo Barnabò as Commendator Viganò
- Tino Scotti as Amico di Biraghin
- Olinto Cristina as Direttore
- Ermanno Roveri
- Carla Rovere
- Elodia Maresca
- Giuseppe Varni
- Franca Tamantini
- Ria Teresa Legnani
- Mimi Dugini

== Bibliography ==
- D'Amico, Masolino . La commedia all'italiana. Il cinema comico in Italia dal 1945 al 1975. Il Saggiatore, 2008.
- Goble, Alan. The Complete Index to Literary Sources in Film. Walter de Gruyter, 1999.
