= The Devil Goes to Boarding School =

1944 film

- Directed by: Jean Boyer
- Written by: Jean Boyer; Achille Campanile; Carlo Veneziani; Franco Zenin
- Based on: Mam'zelle Nitouche by Henri Meilhac and Albert Millaud
- Produced by: Nicola Naracci; Angelo Mosco
- Starring: Lilia Silvi; Leonardo Cortese; Greta Gonda
- Cinematography: Charles Suin
- Edited by: Jacques Desagneaux; Mario Serandrei
- Music by: Eldo Di Lazzaro
- Production company: Excelsa Film
- Distributed by: Minerva Film
- Release date: December 1944
- Running time: 83 minutes
- Country: Italy
- Language: Italian

The Devil Goes to Boarding School (Italian: Il diavolo va in collegio) is a 1944 Italian comedy film directed by Jean Boyer and starring Lilia Silvi, Leonardo Cortese and Greta Gonda. The plot is based on the libretto of the operetta Mam'zelle Nitouche by Henri Meilhac and Albert Millaud. It was shot at the Cinecittà Studios in Rome. The film's sets were designed by the art director Robert Gys.

== Synopsis ==
Graziella, a high-spirited young heiress, it sent to boarding school in order to try and curb her mischievous behaviour. While at first she pretends to be docile, this is just a cover for her to play more tricks on her teachers. In particular she becomes a thorn in the side of one of a young male professor and sets out to sabotage a revue he is staging starring his dancer girlfriend.

== Cast ==
- Lilia Silvi as Graziella
- Leonardo Cortese as Rodolfo Poggi / Marcello Mari
- Greta Gonda as Nora Nori
- Guglielmo Barnabò as Il giudice Testones
- Giacinto Molteni as Bortolo
- Vittorina Benvenuti as Signorina Polipini nº1
- Anna Capodaglio as Signorina Polipini nº2
- Olinto Cristina as Il direttore del teatro
- Liana Del Balzo as Signora Testones
- Giannina Gobbi as Professoressa Bellona
- Lea Migliorini as Una collegiale

== Bibliography ==
- Goble, Alan. The Complete Index to Literary Sources in Film. Walter de Gruyter, 1999.
- Reich, Jacqueline Beth. Fascism, Film, and Female Subjectivity: The Case of Italian Cinema 1936-1943. University of California, Berkeley, 1994.
