= Unjustified Absence =

1939 film directed by Max Neufeld

- Directed by: Max Neufeld
- Written by: István Békeffy (play); Amedeo Castellazzi; Aldo De Benedetti; Carlo Della Posta; Max Neufeld
- Produced by: Giuseppe Amato
- Starring: Alida Valli; Amedeo Nazzari; Lilia Silvi; Paolo Stoppa
- Cinematography: Václav Vích
- Edited by: Maria Rosada
- Music by: Cesare A. Bixio
- Production company: Era Film
- Distributed by: Minerva Film
- Release date: 15 November 1939
- Running time: 90 minutes
- Country: Italy
- Language: Italian

Unjustified Absence (Italian: Assenza ingiustificata) is a 1939 Italian "white-telephones" comedy film directed by Max Neufeld and starring Alida Valli, Amedeo Nazzari and Lilia Silvi. A girl leaves school to marry a doctor, but becomes annoyed by his constant absences and decides to secretly resume her studies.

It was shot at Cinecittà Studios with sets designed by the art director Gastone Medin.

== Cast ==
- Alida Valli as Vera Fabbri
- Amedeo Nazzari as Doctor Carlo Cristiani
- Lilia Silvi as Luisa Albertini
- Paolo Stoppa as Eugenio Sinibaldi
- Guglielmo Barnabò as Mr. Fabbri
- Lia Orlandini as Mrs. Fabbri
- Lauro Gazzolo as the dean
- Olga Solbelli as the "bad" professor
- Giacomo Moschini as the "good" professor
- Pina Gallini as a teacher
- Giana Cellini as a nurse
- Bianca Della Corte as a schoolmate of Vera's
- Daniella Drei as a schoolmate of Vera's
- Liliana Vismara as a schoolmate of Vera's
- Armandina Bianchi as a schoolmate of Vera's
- Maria-Pia Vivaldi as a schoolmate of Vera's
- Nella Morganti as a schoolmate of Vera's
- Luisa Papa as a schoolmate of Vera's

== Bibliography ==
- Gundle, Stephen. Mussolini's Dream Factory: Film Stardom in Fascist Italy. Berghahn Books, 2013.
