= Then We'll Get a Divorce =

1940 film directed by Nunzio Malasomma

- Directed by: Nunzio Malasomma
- Written by: Nunzio Malasomma; Sergio Amidei; Alessandro De Stefani
- Produced by: Angelo Mosco; Nicola Naracci
- Starring: Amedeo Nazzari; Vivi Gioi; Lia Orlandini
- Cinematography: Alberto Fusi; Jaroslav Blazek
- Edited by: Conrad von Molo; Gabriele Varriale
- Music by: Cesare A. Bixio; Felice Montagnini; Ezio Carabella
- Production company: Excelsa Film
- Distributed by: Minerva Film
- Release date: 21 September 1940
- Running time: 85 minutes
- Country: Italy
- Language: Italian

Then We'll Get a Divorce (Italian: Dopo divorzieremo) is a 1940 Italian "white-telephones" comedy film directed by Nunzio Malasomma and starring Amedeo Nazzari, Vivi Gioi and Lia Orlandini.

The film's sets were designed by the art director Piero Filippone. It was shot at the Palatino Studios in Rome. A separate Spanish-language version El marido provisional was also produced by the same director with a different cast.

== Cast ==
- Amedeo Nazzari as Phil Gilder
- Vivi Gioi as Grace Peterson
- Lia Orlandini as Agnes Reed, la direttrice
- Lilia Silvi as Fanny Sullivan
- Noëlle Norman as Helen
- Monique Thibaut as Sarah
- Mignon Cocco as Dorothy
- Regina Bianchi as Margaret
- Mara Landi as Una ragazza della pensione
- Guglielmo Sinaz as Tom Lynch
- Stefano Sibaldi as Mickey
- Giuseppe Rinaldi as Bob
- Cesare Fantoni as Un cliente al night club
- Mario Besesti as Il capo del personale
- Quartetto Ator as Quartetto musicale
- Roberto Bianchi Montero as Fred
- Oscar Andriani as Gary, il balbuziente
- Maria-Pia Vivaldi as Maud
- Bianca Della Corte as Una ragazza della pensione

== Bibliography ==
- Gundle, Stephen. Mussolini's Dream Factory: Film Stardom in Fascist Italy. Berghahn Books, 2013.
