= Christmas at Camp 119 =

1947 film

- DVD cover
- Directed by: Pietro Francisci
- Written by: Giuseppe Amato; Oreste Biancoli; Vittorio De Sica; Aldo Fabrizi
- Produced by: Giuseppe Amato
- Starring: Aldo Fabrizi; Vittorio De Sica; Peppino De Filippo
- Cinematography: Mario Bava; Ferrer Tiezzi
- Edited by: Gabriele Varriale
- Music by: Angelo Francesco Lavagnino
- Production company: Excelsa Film
- Distributed by: Minerva Film
- Release date: 22 December 1947
- Running time: 90 minutes
- Country: Italy
- Language: Italian

Christmas at Camp 119 (Italian: Natale al campo 119) is a 1947 Italian comedy-drama film directed by Pietro Francisci and starring Aldo Fabrizi, Vittorio De Sica and Peppino De Filippo. A group of Italian prisoners of war being held captive in California dream of life back home as they await their release.

It was shot at the Palatino Studios in Rome and on location in Naples, Milan, Florence and Venice. The film's sets were designed by the art director Gastone Medin.

== Cast ==
- Aldo Fabrizi as Giuseppe Mancini
- Vittorio De Sica as Don Vincenzino
- Peppino De Filippo as Gennarino Capece
- Carlo Campanini as Scapizzono
- Massimo Girotti as Nane
- Alberto Rabagliati as Alberto
- Carlo Mazzarella as Ignazio
- Aldo Fiorelli as Guido
- Vera Carmi as The schoolteacher
- Margherita Bagni as Donna Clara
- Rocco D'Assunta as Lojacono
- Olga Villi as Mirella
- María Mercader as Fiammetta
- Nando Bruno as Guide of Roma
- Adolfo Celi as John
- Ave Ninchi as Miss Mancini
- Giacomo Rondinella as The Neapolitan Singer
- Pietro De Vico

== Bibliography ==
- Moliterno, Gino. The A to Z of Italian Cinema. Scarecrow Press, 2009.
