= Oscar Andriani =

Italian actor (1905–1987)

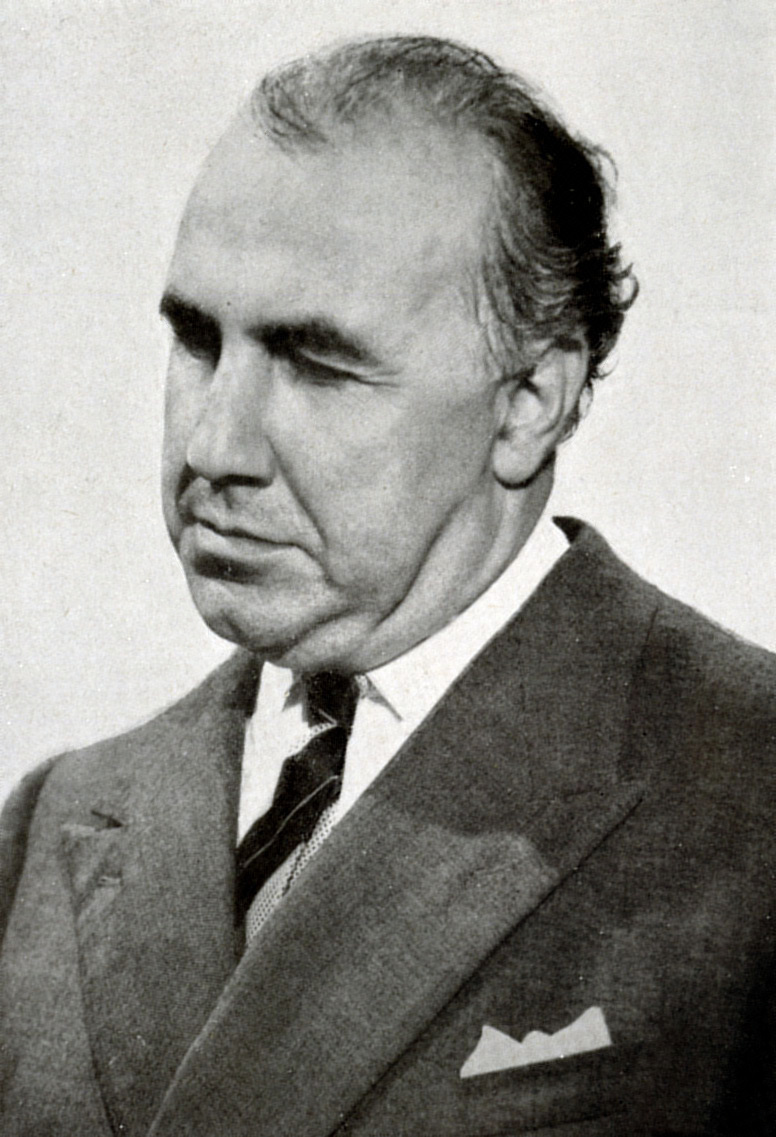
- Born: 28 December 1905; Brescia, Italy
- Died: 17 July 1987 (aged 81); Rome, Italy
- Occupation: Actor
- Years active: 1937–1969

Oscar Andriani (28 December 1905 – 17 July 1987) was an Italian actor and playwright. He appeared in more than fifty films from 1937 to 1969.

== Life and career ==
Born in Brescia, Andriani made his stage debut at 17 years old in the theatrical company of Amedeo Chiantoni, and later worked with other important companies of the time, such the ones led by Emma Gramatica, Wanda Capodaglio and Annibale Ninchi. He had a prolific career as a character film actor, often appearing alongside his real life friend Amedeo Nazzari. He also was a playwright, whose works (often published under pseudonyms) were staged by prominent companies, such as the Giovanni Grasso's, Carlo Veneziani's and Tino Scotti's ones. He wrote the script of the partially autobiographical film World of Miracles, directed in 1959 by Luigi Capuano.

== Filmography ==
Year	Title	Role	Notes
1937	Queen of the Scala		
1938	Luciano Serra, Piloto	Il cappellano militare	
1938	Ettore Fieramosca	Don Pedro	
1939	Cardinal Messias	Padre Reginaldo Giuliani	(in prologue) (scenes deleted)
1939	We Were Seven Widows	Il marito di Liliana	
1939	La notte delle beffe	Un falso brigante	
1939	Cose dell'altro mondo	L'ispettore Clifford	
1940	The Cavalier from Kruja	Il capo della polizia	
1940	Then We'll Get a Divorce	Gary, il balbuziente	
1940	Big Shoes	Un braccianto	
1941	Caravaggio		
1941	Il pozzo dei miracoli		
1941	Il cavaliere senza nome		
1942	La maestrina		
1943	Redenzione		
1943	Quelli della montagna		Uncredited
1944	La donna della montagna	Bertoni	
1950	Alina	Bertolino	
1950	Angelo tra la folla	Cmdr. Petroni	
1950	Strano appuntamento		
1951	Mercado Infame	Portiere	
1951	Beauties on Bicycles		
1951	I'm the Capataz		
1951	Double Cross	Avvocato della difesa	
1951	Auguri e figli maschi!	Commendator Arcangelo Brasca	
1951	Trieste mia!		
1952	Love and Poison		
1952	Beauties in Capri	Il vescovo	
1952	The Bandit of Tacca Del Lupo	The general	
1952	Altri tempi	Il padre	(segment "Pot-pourri di canzoni")
1952	Fratelli d'Italia		
1952	Prisoner in the Tower of Fire	Frate Anselmo	
1953	Il peccato di Anna		
1953	The Lady Without Camelias	Boschi	
1953	Puccini	Giacosa	
1953	Voice of Silence	Presidente tribunale	Uncredited
1953	Per salvarti ho peccato	Il Commissario	
1953	La cavallina storna	L'Intendente	
1954	Cento anni d'amore	The Commander of Garibaldi's Army	(segment "Garibaldina"), Uncredited
1954	Pietà per chi cade	Justice clerk	
1954	Cose da pazzi	The lunatic who writes a letter	
1954	Theodora, Slave Empress	il difensore di Scarpios	
1954	Disonorata - Senza colpa	Giudice	
1954	Ulysses	Calops	
1954	Di qua, di là del Piave		
1955	The White Angel	Un avvocato	
1955	Ripudiata		
1955	L'ultimo amante	Un collega di Cesare	
1956	The Intruder	The Mayor	Uncredited
1956	Un giglio infranto	Gustavo Modena	
1958	Love and Chatter	Consigliere comunale	
1960	Il terrore della maschera rossa		
1962	Ulysses Against the Son of Hercules	Advisor to Ircano	Uncredited
