= Eugenia Grandet (1946 film) =

- Directed by: Mario Soldati
- Written by: Aldo De Benedetti; Mario Soldati
- Based on: Eugénie Grandet by Honoré de Balzac
- Produced by: Ferruccio De Martino
- Starring: Alida Valli
- Cinematography: Václav Vích
- Edited by: Eraldo Da Roma
- Music by: Renzo Rossellini; Roman Vlad
- Production company: Excelsa Film
- Distributed by: Minerva Film
- Release date: 4 January 1947
- Running time: 100 minutes
- Country: Italy
- Language: Italian

Eugenia Grandet (also known as Eugenie Grandet) is a 1946 Italian historical drama film directed by Mario Soldati. It is based on the 1833 novel Eugénie Grandet by Honoré de Balzac. The novel has been adapted into films on a number of occasions. The film's sets were designed by art director Gastone Medin.

The film entered the competition at the 7th Venice International Film Festival. For her performance Alida Valli won the Nastro d'Argento for Best Actress. The film also won the Nastro d'Argento for Best Scenography.

== Cast ==
- Alida Valli as Eugenia Grandet
- Giorgio De Lullo as Charles Grandet
- Gualtiero Tumiati as Felix Grandet
- Giuditta Rissone as Eugenia's mother
- Maria Bodi as Madame Des Grassins
- Giuseppe Varni as Mr. Des Grassins
- Pina Gallini as Nanon
- Lina Gennari as Marquise D'Aubrion
- Enzo Biliotti as Notary Cruchet
- Liana Del Balzo
