= The Flame (1952 film) =

1952 film by Alessandro Blasetti

- Directed by: Alessandro Blasetti
- Written by: Leonardo Benvenuti; Alessandro Blasetti
- Based on: La Flambée by Henry Kistemaeckers
- Starring: Amedeo Nazzari; Eleonora Rossi Drago; Elisa Cegani
- Cinematography: Carlo Montuori
- Edited by: Mario Serandrei
- Music by: Alessandro Cicognini
- Production companies: Excelsa Film; Società Italiana Cines
- Distributed by: Minerva Film
- Release date: 18 October 1952
- Running time: 87 minutes
- Country: Italy
- Language: Italian

The Flame (Italian: La Fiammata) is a 1952 Italian historical melodrama film directed by Alessandro Blasetti and starring Amedeo Nazzari, Eleonora Rossi Drago and Elisa Cegani. It was shot at the Cinecittà Studios in Rome. The film's sets were designed by the art director Mario Chiari.

== Plot ==
With the Franco-Prussian War of 1870 imminent, a reception is held in the castle of the Counts Stettin. Guests included Colonel Felt, brother of Countess Yvonne, and his wife Monica. Minister Beaucourt arrives suddenly, in the past a companion in arms of the colonel and now his political opponent. Beaucourt, who is in love with Monica, tells Felt that his plans to defend the borders have been rejected, and the colonel is outraged. Beaucourt, taking advantage of Monica's disagreement with her husband, is assiduously courting her. Meanwhile, the banker Glogan, an ancient lover of Countess Yvonne, arrives at the castle, who in the past has lent large sums to the colonel, who is unable to repay the money. Glogan then offers to cancel the debt if Felt gives him the plans for the fortifications. Felt, indignant, kills the agent of the enemy. Beaucourt decides to take advantage of what happened to eliminate his rival, but in the end, thanks to Monica's intervention, knowing the true intentions of Glogan and the reasons that led Felt to kill, Beaucourt gives up taking action against the colonel.

== Cast ==
- Amedeo Nazzari as Colonel Felt
- Eleonora Rossi Drago as Monica
- Elisa Cegani as Yvonne Stettin
- Roldano Lupi as Baron Glogau
- Carlo Ninchi as Count Stettin
- Delia Scala as Teresa Derrieux
- Rolf Tasna as Marcello Beaucourt
- Sergio Tofano as Belmont
- Mario Scaccia as Mauret
- Franco Jamonte as Capitan Dufresné
- Sofia Glinski as Contessa de Mauriac
