= One Hundred Thousand Dollars =

1940 film

- Directed by: Mario Camerini
- Written by: Carl Conrad (play); Renato Castellani; Gaspare Cataldo; Luigi Zampa; Mario Camerini
- Produced by: Carridi Oreste Barbieri
- Starring: Assia Noris; Amedeo Nazzari; Lauro Gazzolo
- Cinematography: Alberto Fusi
- Edited by: Giovanna Del Bosco
- Music by: Alessandro Cicognini
- Production company: Astra Film
- Distributed by: ENIC
- Release date: 23 March 1940
- Running time: 83 minutes
- Country: Italy
- Language: Italian

One Hundred Thousand Dollars (Italian: Centomila dollari) is a 1940 Italian "white-telephones" comedy film directed by Mario Camerini and starring Assia Noris, Amedeo Nazzari and Lauro Gazzolo.

It was shot at the Palatino Studios in Rome. The film's sets were designed by the art director Fulvio Jacchia. It was part of the traditional of White Telephone comedies, popular during the era.

== Synopsis ==
An American millionaire staying at a Budapest hotel falls in love with the telephone operator working there. When she refuses his advances because she already has a fiancée, he offers her a hundred thousand dollars to have dinner with him. Although she refuses, when her family find out the amount they pressure her to accept his offer.

== Cast ==
- Assia Noris as Lily Zilay
- Amedeo Nazzari as Woods
- Lauro Gazzolo as Stefano Zilay
- Maurizio D'Ancora as Paolo
- Calisto Bertramo as Barton
- Ernesto Almirante as Michele Zilay
- Emilio Cigoli as Oldham
- Arturo Bragaglia as Paul, il guardino aeroporto
- Liana Del Balzo as Miss Vernon
- Velia Galvani as Elena Zilay
- Gina Cinquini as Zita Zilay
- Lina Tartara Minora as Maria Zilay
- Giulio Battiferri as Un radiotelegrafista
- Ottavio Spina Borgianelli as Il borgomastro
- Ada Colangeli as Francesca, la moglie di Paul
- Dhia Cristiani as Elsa, la telefonista
- Olinto Cristina as Il comandante dell'aeroporto di Budapest
- Arnaldo Firpo as Bartel, l'altro segretario
- Jucci Kellerman as L'altra Lily
- Alfredo Menichelli as Un giornalista

== Bibliography ==
- Gundle, Stephen. Mussolini's Dream Factory: Film Stardom in Fascist Italy. Berghahn Books, 2013.
