= La figlia del diavolo =

- French film poster
- Directed by: Primo Zeglio
- Produced by: Mario Borghi
- Cinematography: Riccardo Pallottini
- Edited by: Giancarlo Cappelli
- Music by: Carlo Rustichelli
- Production company: Excelsa Film
- Distributed by: Minerva Film
- Release date: 1952
- Running time: 83 minutes
- Countries: France; Italy
- Language: Italian

La figlia del diavolo or La fille du diable is a 1952 French-Italian historical drama film directed by Primo Zeglio and starring Massimo Serato, Paola Barbara, and Marina Vlady.

== Plot ==
Garibaldi, after landing in Marsala, moves on to Naples. The liberals are overjoyed but the Bourbons are terrified. The so-called Baron Tucci, on a recommendation from England, arrives at the home of Count Sereni, a notable liberal. But he turns out not to be a patriot who has returned to Italy to take part in the fight but a degraded Bourbon official who has been promised rehabilitation if he can succeed as a spy. Tucci discovers old Sereni's second wife is one of his former lovers and persuades her to murder her husband so as to gain his inheritance. She does indeed cause the count to die, by withholding his heart medicine, but not before he destroys his will. The count's younger daughter hears the argument which breaks out between the lovers. The false baron tries to kill her but she escapes, racing off to the river. There she is saved by a patriot, who takes her to the devil's castle, where conspirators are meeting. On hearing the news, the spy contacts the police, who arrest the girl's fiancé, a young doctor, one of the leading patriots. Sentenced to death, he is about to be hanged but is saved at the last minute by Garibaldi's cavalry. After dealing with the spy, the young patriot joins his beloved fiancée.

== Cast ==
- Massimo Serato as Adolfo Santagata
- Paola Barbara as Donna Giulia
- Marina Vlady as Graziella, figlia del conte Terzi
- Carlo Tamberlani as Conte Vincenzo Terzi
- Roberto Risso as Roberto
- Franco Pastorino as Carlo
- Juan de Landa as Il boia
- Lauro Gazzolo as Il farmacista
- Nico Pepe as Lo 'sconosciuto'
- Edda Soligo as Clotilde
- Luisa Rivelli as Carolina
- Franco Marturano as Il capo delle informazioni
- Edoardo Toniolo as Capitano borbonico
- Emilio Petacci as Girolamo
- Mario Feliciani as Domenico

== Produced ==
The film was an Italian production; Rise Stevens was involved with the production of the film at Milan's La Scala.
