= Poppy (1952 film) =

1952 film

- Directed by: Vittorio Metz; Marcello Marchesi
- Written by: Marcello Marchesi; Vittorio Metz
- Produced by: Mario Silvestri
- Starring: Walter Chiari; Anna Maria Ferrero; Carlo Campanini
- Cinematography: Riccardo Pallottini
- Edited by: Franco Fraticelli
- Music by: Vittorio Mascheroni
- Production company: Excelsa Film
- Distributed by: Minerva Film
- Release date: 1952
- Running time: 90 minutes
- Country: Italy
- Language: Italian

Poppy (Italian: Lo sai che i papaveri) is a 1952 Italian comedy film by Vittorio Metz and Marcello Marchesi and starring Walter Chiari, Anna Maria Ferrero and Carlo Campanini. It was shot at the Ponti-De Laurentis Studios in Rome. The film's sets were designed by the art director Alberto Boccianti.

== Synopsis ==
Unknowingly, respectable schoolteacher Gualtiero leads a double life as Walter who frequents nightclubs every night. Whereas Gualtiero is engaged to a fellow teacher Anna, Walter is a carousing womaniser. Pierina, one of his students who has a crush on him, discovers about his nocturnal visits and seeks him out. They enjoy a romance, but by day he remembers nothing about it. Eventually when confronted, he visits a psychiatrist who reveals he has a dual personality with strong contrasting traits inherited from each of his parents.

== Cast ==
- Walter Chiari as Gualtiero/Walter
- Anna Maria Ferrero as Pierina Zacchi
- Carlo Campanini as Padre di Pierina
- Luisa Rossi as Anna Butti
- Franca Rame as Silvana
- Raimondo Vianello as lo psicoanalista
- Lauro Gazzolo as il preside
- Juan Carlos Lamas as Lamas
- Galeazzo Benti as Viveur del night
- Dorian Gray as La guardarobiera
- Marcella Rovena as Governanta casa Zacchi
- Belle Tildy as Jeanette D'Aubry
- Maria Pia Trepaoli as Cartomante
- Guglielmo Barnabò as Medico
- Ennio Girolami as Marocchi
- Bruno Smith as Direttore del night 'I tarocchi'
- Guglielmo Inglese as il bidello Elia
- Mario De Simone as Compoagna del scuola
- Franco Pastorino as Rinaldo
- Mimmo Poli as 'Sfilatino'
- Furio Meniconi as Spacciatore di droga

== Bibliography ==
- Brunetta, Gian Piero. The History of Italian Cinema: A Guide to Italian Film from Its Origins to the Twenty-first Century. Princeton University Press, 2009.
