= The Taming of the Shrew (1942 film) =

1942 film

- Directed by: Ferdinando Maria Poggioli
- Written by: William Shakespeare (play); Sergio Amidei; Giacomo De Benedetti; Dino Falconi; Gherardo Gherardi; Ferdinando Maria Poggioli
- Produced by: Angelo Mosco; Nicola Naracci
- Starring: Amedeo Nazzari; Lilia Silvi; Lauro Gazzolo
- Cinematography: Renato Del Frate
- Edited by: Mario Serandrei
- Music by: Felice Montagnini
- Production company: Excelsa Film
- Distributed by: Minerva Film
- Release date: 16 September 1942
- Running time: 82 minutes
- Country: Italy
- Language: Italian

The Taming of the Shrew (Italian: La bisbetica domata) is a 1942 Italian comedy film directed by Ferdinando Maria Poggioli and starring Amedeo Nazzari, Lilia Silvi and Lauro Gazzolo. It is based on William Shakespeare's play The Taming of the Shrew, with the setting updated to modern-day Rome.

It was shot at the Cinecittà Studios in Rome. The film's sets were designed by the art director Gastone Medin and Mario Rappini.

== Cast ==
- Amedeo Nazzari as Petruccio
- Lilia Silvi as Catina
- Lauro Gazzolo as Battista, padre di Catina
- Rossana Montesi as Bianca, sorella di Catina
- Paolo Stoppa as Righetto
- Carlo Romano as Remo
- Aldo Capacci as Luciano
- Elvira Marchionni as Ortensia
- Checco Durante as Il commendator Biondelli
- Armando Migliari as Il commendator Guarnacci
- Giuliana Pitti as Maria, la servetta
- Mario Cianfanelli as Romoletto
- Alfredo Del Pelo as Il chitarrista
- Attilio Dottesio as Un attore della filogrammatica
- Pina Gallini as La custode del "castello"
- Walter Grant as Il signore che vorebbesalire sulla carrozzella
- Totò Mignone as L'oste
- Giovanni Petrucci as Giuseppe
- Peppino Spadaro as Un invitato alle nozze
- Luciano Tajoli as Il cantante di stornelli

== Bibliography ==
- Gundle, Stephen. Mussolini's Dream Factory: Film Stardom in Fascist Italy. Berghahn Books, 2013.
