= Big Shoes =

1940 film

- Directed by: Dino Falconi
- Written by: Sándor Hunyady (play); Dino Falconi
- Produced by: Salvatore Persichetti
- Starring: Amedeo Nazzari; Lilia Silvi; Elena Altieri
- Cinematography: Domenico Scala
- Edited by: Ines Donarelli; Vincenzo Sorelli
- Music by: Ettore Montanaro
- Production company: Fono Roma
- Distributed by: ENIC
- Release date: 12 October 1940
- Running time: 83 minutes
- Country: Italy
- Language: Italian

Big Shoes (Italian: Scarpe grosse) is a 1940 Italian "white-telephones" comedy film directed by Dino Falconi and starring Amedeo Nazzari, Lilia Silvi and Elena Altieri. It is based on a play by Sándor Hunyady which had previously been turned into a 1939 Hungarian film Istvan Bors.

It was shot at the Palatino Studios in Rome. The film's sets were designed by the art directors Piero Filippone and Camillo Del Signore.

== Cast ==
- Amedeo Nazzari as Stefano Di Marco
- Lilia Silvi as Ninì
- Elena Altieri as Marta
- Enzo Biliotti as Il conte Carlo Garlandi
- Tina Lattanzi as Sofia Garlandi
- Lauro Gazzolo as Giancola
- Olinto Cristina as Dossena, l'amministratore
- Beatrice Mancini as Maria
- Emilio Petacci as Il notaio Sandelli
- Oreste Fares as Il curato
- Gualtiero De Angelis as Il procuratore Guzzini
- Gorella Gori as Concetta, la cuoca
- Franca Volpini as Annetta, la cameriera
- Gastone Schirato as Michele, il maggiordomo
- Oscar Andriani as Un braccianto
- Fedele Gentile as L'altro braccianto
- Alfredo Menichelli as Gastone

== Bibliography ==
- Piero Pruzzo & Enrico Lancia. Amedeo Nazzari. Gremese Editore, 1983.
