= Giacomo Almirante =

Italian actor (1875–1944)

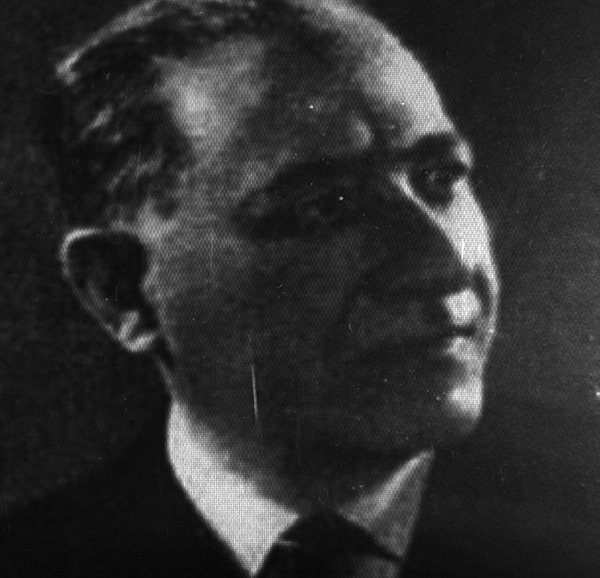
- Born: 12 September 1875; Palermo, Sicily, Italy
- Died: 12 January 1944 (aged 68); Rome, Lazio, Italy
- Occupation: Actor
- Years active: 1916–1942 (film)

Giacomo Almirante (1875–1944) was an Italian stage and film actor.

== Life and career ==
Born in Palermo, the brother of actors Ernesto and Luigi, Almirante made his stage debut in 1891, and was mainly active on theatre, in which he worked, among others, with the Lyda Borelli, Dina Galli, Ermete Novelli, Renzo Ricci, Antonio Gandusio and Nino Besozzi companies. For about a decade he was also active in films as a character actor. He was married to the sister of actor Olinto Cristina.

== Selected filmography ==
- Paradise (1932)
- Pergolesi (1932)
- I'll Give a Million (1936)
- Dora Nelson (1939)
- Saint John, the Beheaded (1940)
- A Romantic Adventure (1940)
- Teresa Venerdì (1941)
- Scampolo (1941)
