= The Secret of Villa Paradiso =

1940 film directed by Domenico Gambino

- Directed by: Domenico Gambino
- Written by: Leo Bomba; Alessandro De Stefani; Giacomo Dusmet
- Produced by: Federico D'Avack
- Starring: Luisa Ferida; Giovanni Grasso; Mino Doro
- Cinematography: Tamás Keményffy
- Edited by: Mario Serandrei
- Music by: Costantino Ferri
- Production company: Sovrania Film
- Distributed by: Generalcine
- Release date: January 1940
- Running time: 76 minutes
- Country: Italy
- Language: Italian

The Secret of Villa Paradiso (Italian: Il segreto di Villa Paradiso) is a 1940 Italian crime drama film directed by Domenico Gambino and starring Luisa Ferida, Giovanni Grasso and Mino Doro. It was shot at the Cinecittà Studios in Rome. The film's sets were designed by the art director Salvo D'Angelo.

== Synopsis ==
In Argentina a gang of counterfeiters operate out of a villa that is used as a gambling house. The murder of a police officer leads detectives to investigate.

== Cast ==
- Luisa Ferida as Mary, la cantante
- Giovanni Grasso as Gorman
- Mino Doro as L'ispettore Gabriel Lopez
- Carlo Duse as Rosenberg
- Lily Vincenti as Lilly, la sua amichetta
- Roberto Bianchi Montero as Fernando
- Hilde Petri as Paquita
- Lilia Silvi as Rosita
- Gualtiero De Angelis as Paco
- Lauro Gazzolo as Joe
- Achille Majeroni as Mahoney
- Olinto Cristina as L'ispettore capo

== Bibliography ==
- Chiti, Roberto & Poppi, Roberto. I film: Tutti i film italiani dal 1930 al 1944. Gremese Editore, 2005.
- Curti, Roberto. Italian Giallo in Film and Television: A Critical History. McFarland, 2022.
