= The Document =

1939 film

- Directed by: Mario Camerini
- Written by: Mario Camerini; Renato Castellani; Mario Monicelli; Mario Pannunzio; Ivo Perilli; Mario Soldati; Guglielmo Zorzi (play)
- Produced by: Giuseppe Amato
- Starring: Ruggero Ruggeri; Armando Falconi; María Denis
- Cinematography: Arturo Gallea
- Edited by: Mario Camerini; Giovanna Del Bosco
- Music by: Alessandro Cicognini
- Production company: Società Esercizi Cinema e Teatro
- Distributed by: ICI
- Release date: 25 November 1939
- Running time: 92 minutes
- Country: Italy
- Language: Italian

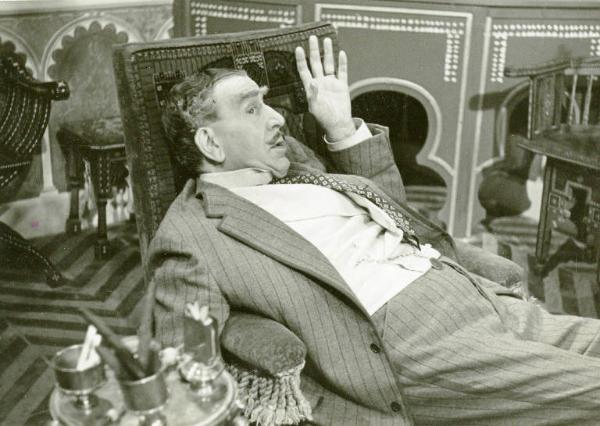
Armando Falconi in a scene from the film

The Document (Italian: Il documento) is a 1939 Italian "white-telephones" comedy film directed by Mario Camerini and starring Ruggero Ruggeri, Armando Falconi and María Denis.

It was made at the Cinecittà Studios in Rome. The film's art direction was by Gastone Medin.

== Cast ==
- Ruggero Ruggeri as Leandro, il maggiordomo
- Armando Falconi as Il commendator Larussi
- María Denis as La contessina Luisa Sabelli
- Maurizio D'Ancora as L'ingegnere Pezzini detto 'Pallino'
- Giacomo Moschini as Il conte Sabelli
- Arturo Bragaglia as Lulù
- Ernesto Almirante
- Mercedes Brignone
- Pina Gallini
- Tullio Galvani
- Adele Garavaglia
- Lauro Gazzolo as Uno dei lestofani
- Giuseppe Pierozzi

== Bibliography ==
- Stewart, John. Italian Film: A Who's Who, McFarland, 1994.
