= Giuseppe Amato =

Italian film producer

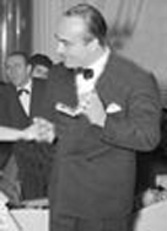
- Born: Giuseppe Vasaturo; 24 August 1899; Naples, Kingdom of Italy
- Died: 3 February 1964 (aged 64); Rome, Italy
- Occupations: Film producer, screenwriter, director
- Years active: 1932–1961

Giuseppe Amato (born Giuseppe Vasaturo; 24 August 1899 – 3 February 1964) was an Italian film producer, screenwriter and director. He produced 58 films between 1932 and 1961, and is especially known for Bicycle Thieves. He was born in Naples and died in Rome from a heart attack.

== Selected filmography ==
- Five to Nil (1932)
- Three Lucky Fools (1933)
- The Little Schoolmistress (1934)
- Territorial Militia (1935)
- Those Two (1935)
- Thirty Seconds of Love (1936)
- The Man Who Smiles (1936)
- I Don't Know You Anymore (1936)
- The Castiglioni Brothers (1937)
- It Was I! (1937)
- L'amor mio non muore (1938)
- The House of Shame (1938)
- The Count of Brechard (1938)
- The Document (1939)
- Heartbeat (1939)
- Unjustified Absence (1939)
- Department Store (1939)
- Eternal Melodies (1940)
- A Romantic Adventure (1940)
- Red Roses (1940 - director) Rose scarlatte, co-directed with Vittorio De Sica
- The Jester's Supper (1942)
- Four Steps in the Clouds (1942)
- Before the Postman (1942)
- The Peddler and the Lady (1943)
- Apparition (1943)
- Shoeshine (also known as Shoeshine Boys) (1946)
- Rome, Open City (1945)
- Malìa (1946)
- Christmas at Camp 119 (1948)
- Yvonne la Nuit (1949)
- Paris Is Always Paris (1951)
- A Thief in Paradise (1952)
- Umberto D. (1952)
- The Return of Don Camillo (1952)
- Donne proibite (1953)
- The Last Five Minutes - Gli ultimi cinque minuti (1955)
- Move and I'll Shoot (1958)
- Arrivederci Roma (1958 - writer)
- The Facts of Murder (1959)
- La Dolce Vita (1960)
