= Ginevra degli Almieri =

1935 film

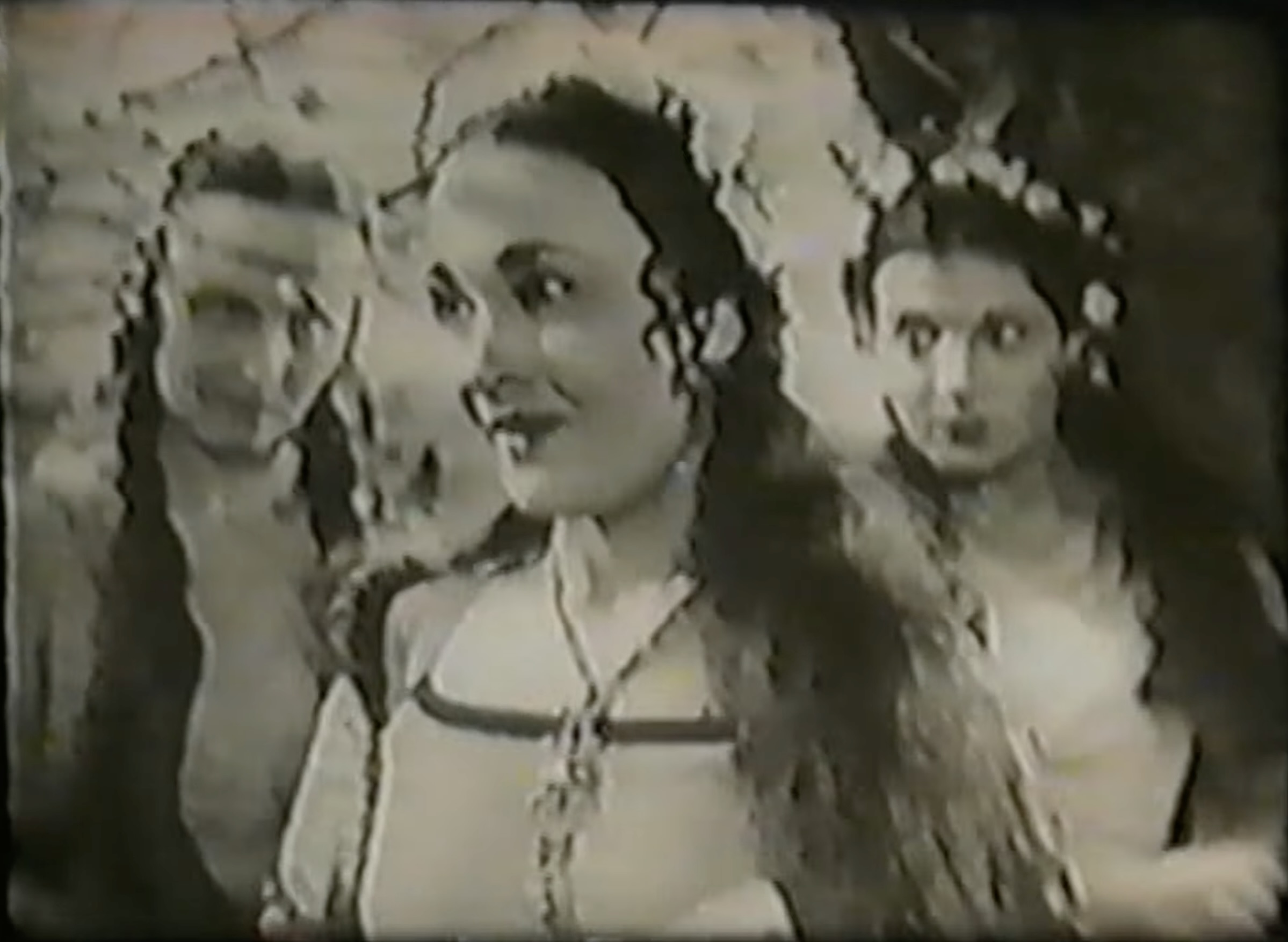
- Merlini in a film scene
- Directed by: Guido Brignone
- Written by: Luigi Bonelli; Ivo Perilli; Guido Brignone
- Produced by: Liborio Capitani
- Starring: Elsa Merlini; Amedeo Nazzari
- Cinematography: Ubaldo Arata
- Edited by: Giuseppe Fatigati
- Music by: Gian Luca Tocchi
- Production company: Capitani Film
- Distributed by: ICAR
- Release date: 1935
- Running time: 87 minutes
- Country: Italy
- Language: Italian

Ginevra degli Almieri is a 1935 Italian historical drama film directed by Guido Brignone, starring Elsa Merlini and Amedeo Nazzari. Merlini had spotted Nazzari during a stage play, and lobbied for his casting in his film debut. Nazzari went on to be a leading star of Italian cinema. It is set in Florence in the fifteenth century.

== Partial cast ==
- Elsa Merlini as Ginevra Degli Almieri
- Amedeo Nazzari as Antonio Rondinelli
- Uberto Palmarini as Ginevra's father
- Ugo Ceseri as Francesco Agolanti
- Guido Riccioli as Burchiello
- Maurizio D'Ancora as Paolino
- Ermanno Roveri as Menicuccio
- Tina Lattanzi as Dianora
- Luigi Almirante as the notary

== Bibliography ==
- Gundle, Stephen. Mussolini's Dream Factory: Film Stardom in Fascist Italy. Berghahn Books, 2013.
