= Noi siamo le colonne =

- Directed by: Luigi Filippo D'Amico
- Written by: Leo Benvenuti; Piero De Bernardi; Vittorio Metz; Marcello Marchesi; Sandro Continenza; Luigi Filippo D'Amico
- Story by: Giulio Moreno
- Produced by: Vittorio Forges Davanzati; Silvano Valenti
- Starring: Vittorio De Sica; Franco Fabrizi; Antonio Cifariello
- Cinematography: Pier Ludovico Pavoni
- Edited by: Mario Serandrei
- Music by: Mario Nascimbene
- Release date: 1956
- Language: Italian

Noi siamo le colonne (i.e. "We are the columns") is a 1956 Italian comedy-drama film written and directed by Luigi Filippo D'Amico and starring Vittorio De Sica, Franco Fabrizi and Antonio Cifariello.

== Cast ==
- Vittorio De Sica as Alfredo Celimontani
- Franco Fabrizi as Aldo Perego
- Antonio Cifariello as Ugo Stefani
- Mireille Granelli as Lea
- Vanna Vivaldi as Elettra
- Aroldo Tieri as Archimede
- Lauro Gazzolo as Mr. Bonci
- Zoe Incrocci as Archimede's Sister
- Ottavio Alessi as Bartolozzi
- Elisa Montés as Sofia
- Pina Gallini as Giulia
- Laura Betti as The Singer
- Franco Migliacci
- Liana Del Balzo
- Nando Tamberlani
