= Lilia Silvi =

Italian film actress (1922–2013)

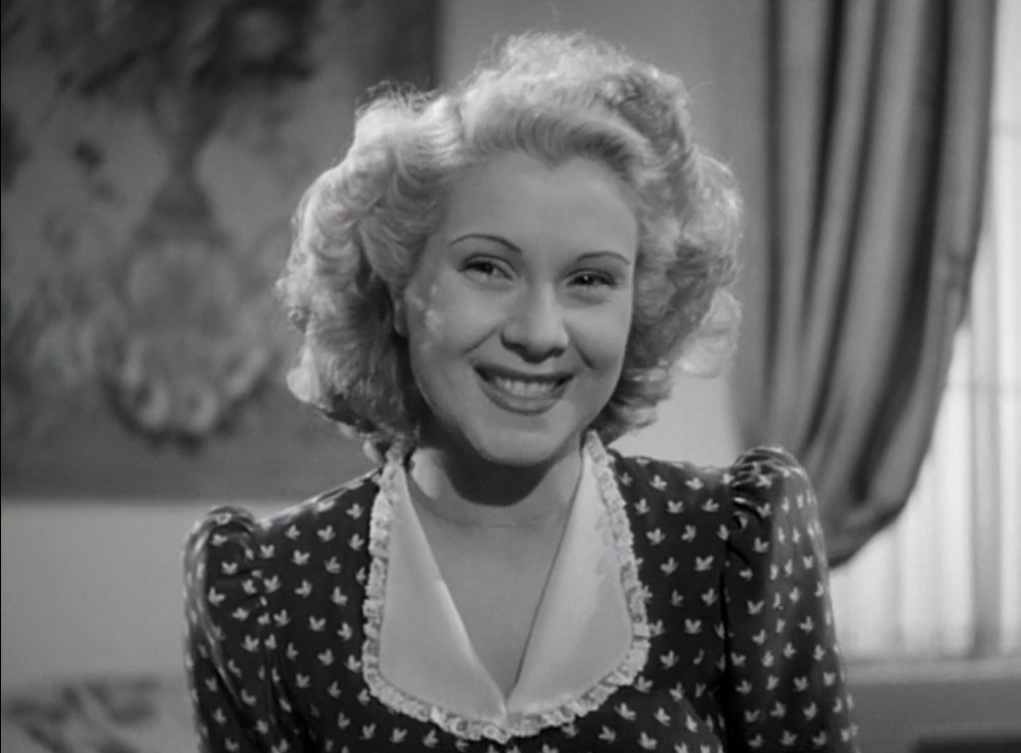
- Silvi in Lively Teresa (1943)
- Born: Silvana Musitelli; 23 December 1922; Rome, Lazio; Italy
- Died: 27 July 2013 (aged 90); Nettuno, Lazio; Italy
- Occupation: Actress
- Years active: 1930–2011

Lilia Silvi (22 December 1922 – 27 July 2013) was an Italian film actress. Silvi was one of several young actresses presented as an Italian equivalent to the Canadian-born Hollywood star Deanna Durbin. She appeared opposite Amedeo Nazzari, the most popular Italian star of the era, in five films.

== Selected filmography ==
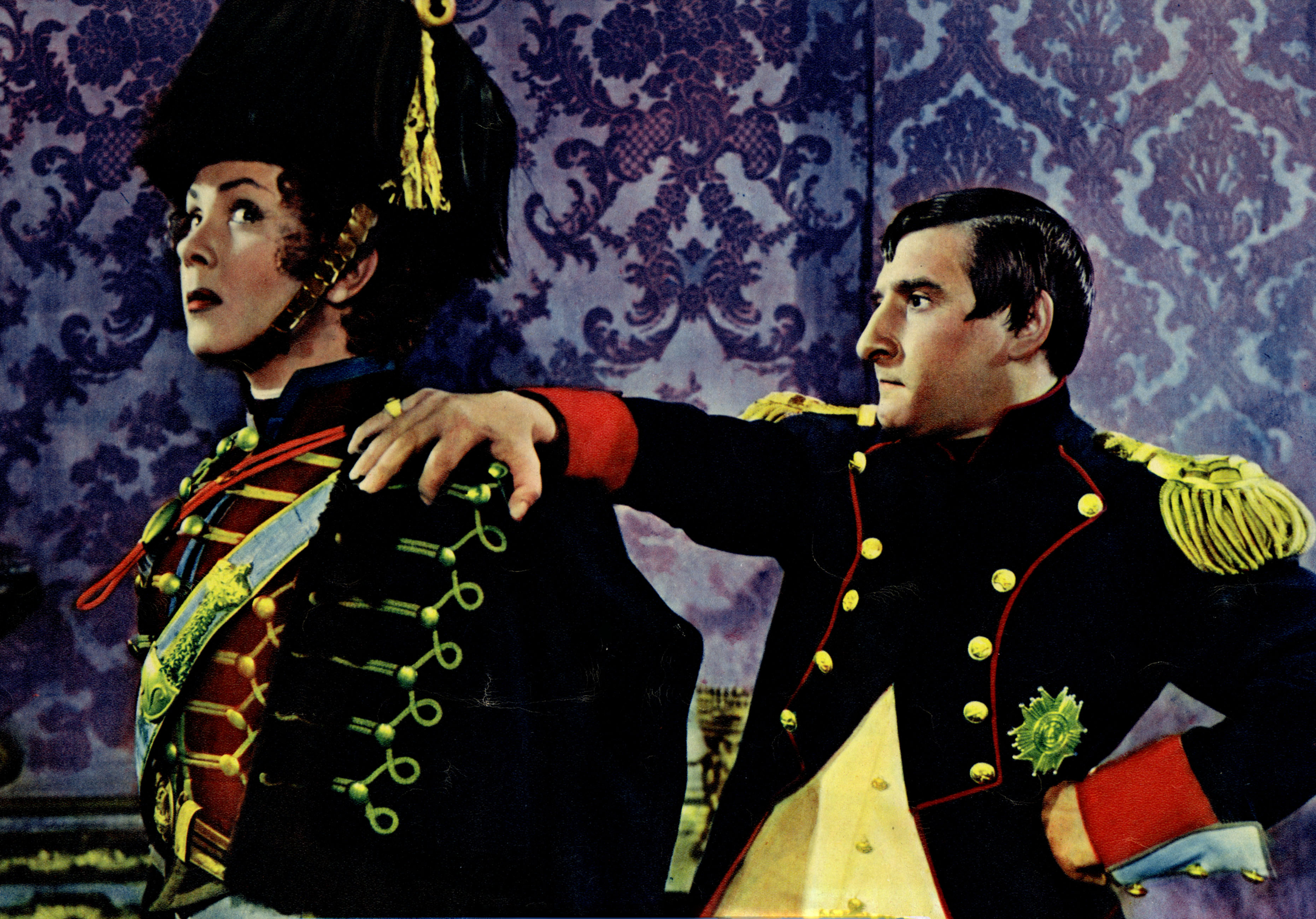
Silvi with Renato Rascel in Napoleon (1951)

- Il signor Max (1937)
- Departure (1938)
- Unjustified Absence (1939)
- Then We'll Get a Divorce (1940)
- Big Shoes (1940)
- The Secret of Villa Paradiso (1940)
- The Jester's Supper (1941)
- Scampolo (1941)
- Happy Days (1942)
- The Taming of the Shrew (1942)
- Violets in Their Hair (1942)
- Lively Teresa (1943)
- The Devil Goes to Boarding School (1944)
- Biraghin (1946)
- Napoleon (1951)

== Bibliography ==
- De Grazia, Victoria. How Fascism Ruled Women: Italy, 1922-1945. University of California Press, 1992.
- Gundle, Stephen. Mussolini's Dream Factory: Film Stardom in Fascist Italy. Berghahn Books, 2013.
