= A Romantic Adventure =

1940 film

- Directed by: Mario Camerini
- Written by: Renato Castellani; Gaspare Cataldo; Ivo Perilli; Giulio Morelli; Mario Soldati; Mario Camerini
- Based on: The Romantic Adventures Of A Milkmaid by Thomas Hardy
- Produced by: Giuseppe Amato
- Starring: Assia Noris; Gino Cervi; Leonardo Cortese
- Cinematography: Arturo Gallea
- Edited by: Giovanna Del Bosco
- Music by: Alessandro Cicognini
- Production company: ENIC
- Distributed by: ENIC
- Release date: 6 September 1940
- Running time: 82 minutes
- Country: Italy
- Language: Italian

A Romantic Adventure (Italian: Una romantica avventura) is a 1940 Italian historical drama film directed by Mario Camerini and starring Assia Noris, Gino Cervi and Leonardo Cortese. It is inspired by the 1883 short story The Romantic Adventures Of A Milkmaid by Thomas Hardy. Produced when the two countries were at war, the setting was shifted from the English countryside of the late nineteenth century to Piedmont in the 1830s.

It was shot at the Cinecittà Studios in Rome and on location around Lake Orta. The film's sets were designed by the art director Gastone Medin. It was screened at the 1940 Venice Film Festival.

== Cast ==
- Assia Noris as Angioletta/Anna/Annetta
- Gino Cervi as Luigi
- Leonardo Cortese as Il conte
- Olga Solbelli as La vedova Cavara
- Ernesto Almirante as Berni, il socio di Luigi
- Calisto Bertramo as Silvestro
- Massimo Girotti as Luciano
- Alfredo Martinelli as Il violonista dell'orchestra paesana
- Armando Migliari as Il padre di Annetta
- Giacomo Almirante as Il dottore
- Bianca Beltrami as Un'amica di Annetta
- Edoardo Borelli as Il farmacista
- Adelmo Cocco as Don Antonio, il prete
- Dhia Cristiani as Tonina, la cameriere
- Adele Mosso as La nonna di Annetta
- Amalia Pellegrini as La vecchia domestica
- Armando Rossini as Pinotto
- Edda Soligo as Un'amica di Annetta
- Lina Termini as La cantante
- Olga von Kollar as Un'amica di Annetta

== Bibliography ==
- Aprà, Adriano. The Fabulous Thirties: Italian cinema 1929-1944. Electa International, 1979.
