= Ugo Lombardi =

Italian cinematographer

- Born: 19 July 1911; Rome, Italy
- Died: 6 July 2002 (aged 90); São Paulo, Brazil
- Occupations: Cinematographer, Director
- Years active: 1936–1967

Ugo Lombardi (19 July 1911 – 6 July 2002) was an Italian cinematographer known for his work in Brazilian cinema. He also directed two films. He was the father of the actress Bruna Lombardi.

== Selected filmography ==
Year	Film
1938	Pietro Micca
1939	No Man's Land
1940	The Hussar Captain
1941	Honeymoon
1941	Lucky Night
1942	The Princess of Dreams
1943	Lively Teresa
1943	Two Hearts Among the Beasts
1946	Desire
1948	Guarany
1948	The Howl
1953	The Curious Impertinent
1953	A Flea on the Scales

== Bibliography ==
- Bondanella, Peter. The Films of Roberto Rossellini. Cambridge University Press, 1993.
