= Alessandro De Stefani =

Italian screenwriter

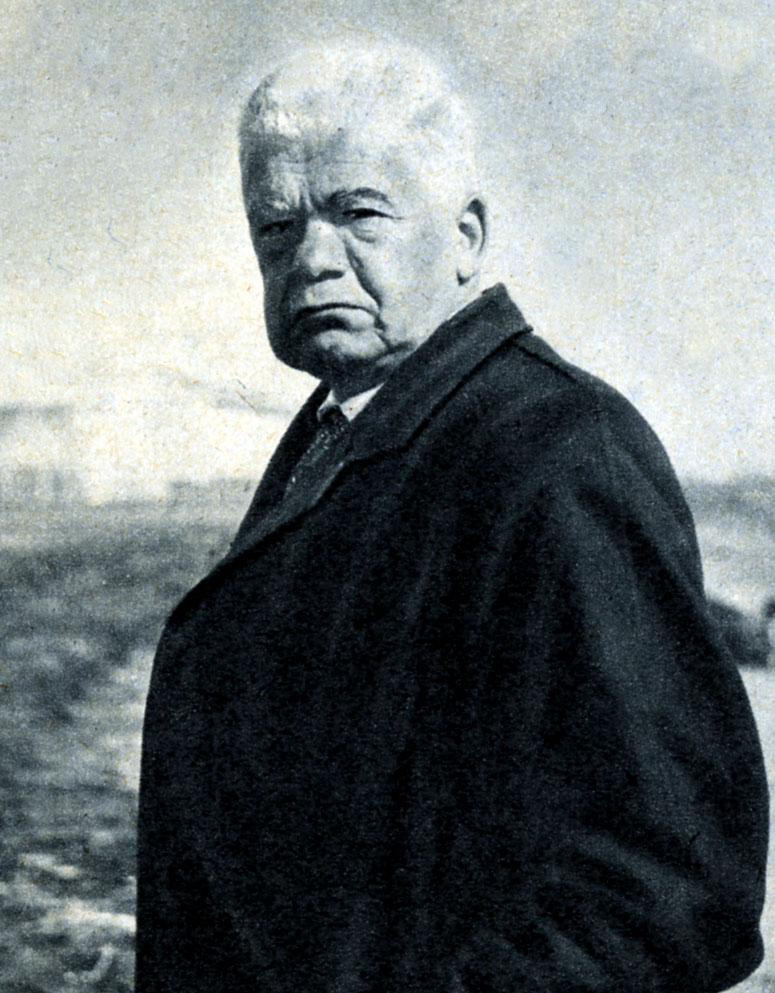
- De Stefani in 1955.
- Born: 1 January 1891; Friuli-Venezia Giulia, Italy
- Died: 13 May 1970 (aged 79); Rome, Italy
- Occupation: Screenwriter
- Years active: 1918-1962

Alessandro De Stefani (1 January 1891 – 13 May 1970) was an Italian screenwriter. He wrote for 90 films between 1918 and 1962.

== Selected filmography ==
- Maciste on Vacation (1921)
- Under the Snow (1922)
- Paradise (1932)
- The Table of the Poor (1932)
- Your Money or Your Life (1932)
- Fanny (1933)
- Together in the Dark (1933)
- Nini Falpala (1933)
- My Little One (1933)
- They've Kidnapped a Man (1938)
- Castles in the Air (1939)
- The Knight of San Marco (1939)
- The Boarders at Saint-Cyr (1939)
- The Siege of the Alcazar (1940)
- Love Trap (1940)
- The Secret of Villa Paradiso (1940)
- The Daughter of the Green Pirate (1940)
- Then We'll Get a Divorce (1940)
- The First Woman Who Passes (1940)
- The Three Pilots (1942)
- Bengasi (1942)
- Captain Tempest (1942)
- The Lion of Damascus (1942)
- Violets in Their Hair (1942)
- The Howl (1948)
- The Mute of Portici (1952)
- Storms (1953)
- Woman of the Red Sea (1953)
- Maddalena (1954)
- The Adventures of Nicholas Nickleby (1958, TV series)
