= Caravaggio, il pittore maledetto =

1941 Italian historical drama film

- Directed by: Goffredo Alessandrini
- Screenplay by: Bruno Valeri; Ákos Tolnay; Riccardo Freda; Gherardo Gherardi; Goffredo Alessandrini
- Story by: Bruno Valeri; Vittorio Verga
- Produced by: Francesco Curato
- Starring: Amedeo Nazzari; Clara Calamai; Lamberto Picasso; Nino Crisman
- Cinematography: Aldo Toni; Jan Stallich
- Edited by: Giancarlo Cappelli
- Music by: Riccardo Zandonai
- Production company: Elica Film
- Distributed by: Minerva Film
- Release date: 6 February 1941 (Italy)
- Running time: 108 minutes
- Country: Italy

Caravaggio, il pittore maledetto (English: Caravaggio, the Damned Painter) is a 1941 Italian historical drama film directed by Goffredo Alessandrini and starring Amedeo Nazzari, Clara Calamai and Lamberto Picasso. Nazzari portrays the painter Caravaggio as a wayward genius. It was one of his favourite screen roles.

== Main cast ==
- Amedeo Nazzari as Michelangelo Merisi, il "Caravaggio"
- Clara Calamai as Madonna Giaconella
- Lamberto Picasso as Il cavalier d'Arpino
- Nino Crisman as Alef di Wignacourt
- Lauro Gazzolo as Zio Nello
- Beatrice Mancini as Lena
- Olinto Cristina as Il cardinale Dal Monte
- Maria Dominiani as Alessandra
- Achille Majeroni as Il cardinale Scipione Borghese
- Renato Malavasi as Mauro

== Production ==
Screenwriter Riccardo Freda met Francesco Curato and partner of his Carbone, who were trying to produce a film on the Italian painter Caravaggio. The budget of the film became higher and higher. It was shot in 1940 and was released the following year, making it the first film from Elica Film. Freda is credited in the film as having "collaborated to the making of the film." Besides working on the screenplay, Freda acted as the executive producer and worked on the art direction and created a maquette of the port of Ostia.

The film starred Amedeo Nazzari was among Italy's most popular actors at the time and was conflicted with the role when his character Caravaggio did not embrace or kiss any woman in the film, which he thought would put his career at risk.

== Release ==
Caravaggio, il pittore maledetto was distributed theatrically in Italy by Minerva Film on 6 February 1941.
