= Messalina (1951 film) =

1951 film directed by Carmine Gallone

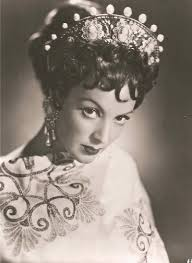
- A promotional picture for the film featuring María Félix.
- Directed by: Carmine Gallone
- Written by: Carmine Gallone; Vittorio Nino Novarese; Albert Valentin; Pierre Laroche; Cesare Ludovici
- Produced by: Carmine Gallone; Cesáreo González; Georges Lourau
- Starring: María Félix; Georges Marchal; Memo Benassi
- Cinematography: Anchise Brizzi
- Edited by: Niccolò Lazzari
- Music by: Renzo Rossellini
- Production companies: Produzione Gallone; Filmsonor; Suevia Films
- Distributed by: CEI Incom
- Release dates: 4 December 1951; November 1954 (US)
- Running time: 102 minutes
- Countries: Italy; France; Spain
- Language: Italian

Messalina or The Affairs of Messalina is a 1951 historical drama film directed by Carmine Gallone and starring María Félix, Georges Marchal and Memo Benassi. It was a co-production between France, Italy and Spain. It was shot at the Cinecittà studios in Rome with sets designed by the art directors Gastone Medin and Vittorio Nino Novarese. It was part of a growing trend of epic historical films of 1950s.

== Synopsis ==
The film portrays the story of the Messalina, the third wife of the Roman Emperor Claudius.

== Main cast ==
- María Félix as Messalina
- Georges Marchal as Caio Silio / Gaius Silius
- Memo Benassi as Claudio / Claudius
- Delia Scala as Cinzia
- Erno Crisa as Timo / Timus
- Carlo Ninchi as Tauro / Taurus
- Camillo Pilotto as Ottavio / Octave
- Jean Tissier as Mnester
- Jean Chevrier as Valerio / Valerius Asiaticus
- Germaine Kerjean as Ismene
- Ave Ninchi as Locusta / Locuste
- Michel Vitold as Narciso / Narcissus
- Giuseppe Varni as Pallante
- Luigi Almirante as the jeweler
- Lamberto Picasso as the astrologer
- Gino Saltamerenda as the brothel's manager
- Cesare Barbetti as Lucio / Lucius
- Achille Majeroni as Appolonio / Appolonius
- Giovanna Galletti as the Christian woman

== Bibliography ==
- Winkler, Martin N. Cinema and Classical Texts: Apollo's New Light. Cambridge University Press, 2009.
