= The Hussar Captain =

1940 film

- Pina Gallini, Carlo Romano, Jone Romano and Lola Braccini in a scene from the film
- Directed by: Sándor Szlatinay
- Written by: Sándor Hunyady; Sándor Szlatinay; Carlo Veneziani; Luigi Zampa
- Starring: Clara Tabody; Enrico Viarisio; Pina Gallini
- Cinematography: Ugo Lombardi
- Edited by: Otello Colangeli
- Music by: Edoardo De Risi
- Production company: Nuova Film
- Distributed by: Industrie Cinematografiche Italiane
- Release date: 10 October 1940
- Running time: 68 minutes
- Country: Italy
- Language: Italian

The Hussar Captain or Captain of the Hussars (Italian: Il capitano degli ussari) is a 1940 Italian comedy film directed by Sándor Szlatinay and starring Clara Tabody, Enrico Viarisio and Pina Gallini. It was made at the Fert Studios in Turin. The film's sets were designed by Alfredo Montori. A separate Hungarian version The Bercsenyi Hussars was also produced.

== Cast ==
- Clara Tabody as La ballerina
- Enrico Viarisio as Varady, ex-capitano degli ussari
- Paolo Viero as Suo figlio
- Pina Gallini as La prima zia
- Lola Braccini as La seconda zia
- Jone Romano as La zitella
- Arturo Bragaglia
- Livia Minelli
- Luigi Pavese
- Carlo Romano
- Aroldo Tieri

== Bibliography ==
- Poppi, Roberto. I film: Tutti i film italiani dal 1930 al 1944. Gremese Editore, 2005.
