= Lauro Gazzolo =

Italian actor (1900–1970)

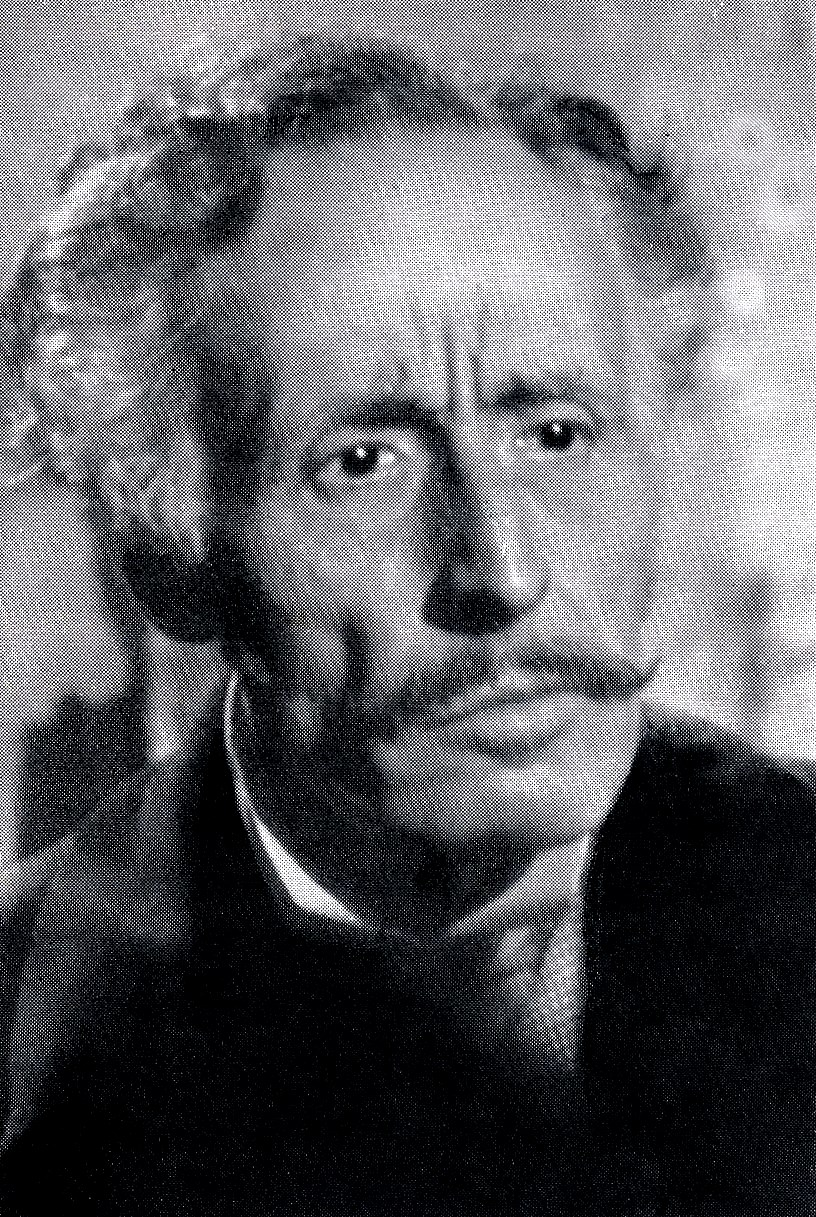
- Gazzolo in 1940
- Born: Ilario Gazzolo; 15 October 1900; Nervi, Italy
- Died: 2 October 1970 (aged 69); Rome, Italy
- Occupations: Actor; voice actor
- Years active: 1938–1970
- Children: Nando; Virginio

Lauro Gazzolo (born Ilario Gazzolo; 15 October 1900 – 2 October 1970) was an Italian actor and voice actor.

== Biography ==
Born in Nervi, Gazzolo began his career on screen in 1938 starring in the comedy film The Document and became more successful after the end of World War II. A popular character actor, he appeared in at least 106 films and played many roles between 1939 and 1966. Among his most popular filmography included The Jester's Supper, Four Steps in the Clouds and The Band of Honest Men. In his later films, he appeared alongside his son Nando Gazzolo in the 1961 film Constantine and the Cross. This would mark Nando's film debut.

As a voice actor, Gazzolo dubbed foreign films into the Italian language. He was the official Italian voice actor of Walter Brennan and Bud Abbott. He even dubbed over the voices of Sam Jaffe, George Hayes, Peter Lorre, Alan Napier, Joseph Egger, Arthur Malet, H. B. Warner, Gary Cooper, Charlie Chaplin, Charley Grapewin and Fernandel in either most of or their iconic film appearances. He was best known for dubbing elderly characters in western films and he was partnered up with his colleague Carlo Romano (Lou Costello's official dubber) in the Abbott and Costello sketches.

In Gazzolo's animated roles, he was renowned for dubbing characters in Walt Disney films such as Bashful in Snow White and the Seven Dwarfs, Dandy Crow in Dumbo, The White Rabbit in Alice in Wonderland, Archimedes in The Sword in the Stone, Jock in Lady and the Tramp, Rabbit from 1968 to 1970, Speaker of Goofy's shorts in Californy 'er Bust, Professor Owl, Ludwig Von Drake from 1963 to 1970 and Goofy from 1950s to 1960s.

=== Personal life ===
Gazzolo had one son, Nando, from his marriage to Aida Ottaviani Piccolo, who was a radio announcer for EIAR. He also had another son, Virginio, from his marriage to Maria Natalina Robino. Nando was an actor and voice actor, Virginio was a voice actor.

Gazzolo died in Rome on 2 October 1970, thirteen days before his 70th birthday.

== Filmography ==
=== Cinema ===
Year	Title	Role	Notes
1938	Duetto vagabondo		
1939	At Your Orders, Madame	Il cameriere all'albergo	
1939	I, His Father	Sardella	
1939	O sole mio		
1939	La grande luce - Montevergine	Bartolomeo	
1939	Two Million for a Smile	L'ufficiale giudiziario	
1939	Defendant, Stand Up!	L'uomo dagli schiaffi	
1939	Unjustified Absence	Dean	
1939	The Document	Uno dei lestofani	
1939	Cose dell'altro mondo	Sam Raymond	
1940	The Secret of Villa Paradiso	Joe	
1940	Red Tavern	Domenico Torresi	
1940	One Hundred Thousand Dollars	Stefano Zilay	
1940	Mare	Perasso	
1940	Incanto di mezzanotte	Martino	
1940	Beyond Love	Count Sabelli-Catanzaro	
1940	Big Shoes	Giancola	
1940	Inspector Vargas	Dedè	
1940	La leggenda azzurra		
1940	Eternal Melodies	Il locandiere Deiner	
1941	Caravaggio	Zio Nello	
1941	The Actor Who Disappeared	L'impresario	
1941	Con le donne non si scherza	Il professor Ferri	
1941	Pia de' Tolomei	Fra' Martino	
1941	The Betrothed	Ambrogio Fusella	
1942	The Jester's Supper	Il Trinca	
1942	Headlights in the Fog	Egisto	
1942	Giungla	Will Rubber	
1942	The Black Panther	Stefano Hegeduz	
1942	Soltanto un bacio	Il professore Giorgi	
1942	The Taming of the Shrew	Battista	
1942	The Gorgon	Il fedele servo di Spina	
1942	Four Steps in the Clouds	Il controllore sul treno	
1942	Notte di fiamme		
1943	It Happened in Damascus	Cadi Al-Mon	
1943	Redemption	Tonio	
1943	Incontri di notte	Il professore Lauro Renzi	
1943	Short Circuit	Isidoro Storch	
1943	A Living Statue	Raffaele	
1943	Enrico IV	Giovanni	
1943	Grazia		
1943	The Last Wagon	Andrea	
1944	In cerca di felicità	Peppino	
1944	Vietato ai minorenni	Il professore di storia naturale	
1945	La resa di Titì		
1945	Lettere al sottotenente		
1945	The Innocent Casimiro	Pietro	
1945	Down with Misery	Il commandattore Trombetti	
1946	The Models of Margutta	Federico	
1946	The Ways of Sin	Il farmacista	
1946	Peddlin' in Society	Il commandatore Bardacò	
1946	Trepidazione		
1946	Il mondo vuole così	Carla's father	
1946	Biraghin	Biraghin's father	
1947	Shamed	Valentino	
1948	Man with the Grey Glove	Critico d'arte	
1950	Il cielo è rosso	Shoemaker	
1950	Ring Around the Clock	Guerrieri	
1950	Alina	Paolo	
1950	Father's Dilemma	Cliente che compro l'uovo pasquale	
1950	Tomorrow Is Too Late	Signor Giusti	
1950	Strano appuntamento		
1950	Sambo	Conte Orsetto Orseolo	
1951	Canzone di primavera	Parodi	
1952	Fiamme sulla laguna	Antonio	
1952	Ha da venì... don Calogero	Evaristo, il farmacista	
1952	Beauties in Capri	Don Camillo	
1952	The Woman Who Invented Love	Marchese Doria	
1952	Il romanzo della mia vita	Cavalier Marchetti	
1952	La figlia del diavolo	Il farmacista	
1952	Poppy	Il preside	
1952	La colpa di una madre	Il pescatore	
1952	Il tallone di Achille	Ing, Felix	
1953	Riscatto	L'oste	
1953	Sul ponte dei sospiri	Il banchiere	
1953	Too Young for Love	Vicepresidente del tribunale	
1953	Martin Toccaferro	Commendatore	
1953	Past Lovers		
1954	Of Life and Love	The administrator	Segment "Marsina Stretta"
1954	Mid-Century Loves	The Teacher	Segment "Guerra 1915-18"
1954	The Three Thieves	The Prosecutor	
1954	Pellegrini d'amore	Capitano peschereccio	
1954	House of Ricordi	Carlotti	
1954	Casta Diva	Signor Monti	
1955	Accadde tra le sbarre	Leonida Dei	
1955	La ladra	Il Maggiordomo	
1955	Io sono la Primula Rossa	Chiffon	
1955	Dramma nel porto		
1956	Incatenata dal destino		
1956	The Band of Honest Men	Andrea	
1956	Mai ti scorderò	Don Vincenzo	
1956	I miliardari	Il medico	
1956	Due sosia in allegria		
1956	Londra chiama Polo Nord	Colonel Richardson	
1956	Noi siamo le colonne	Signor Bonci	
1957	Saranno uomini		
1958	Goha	Taj-el-Ouloum	
1958	Adorabili e bugiarde	President of the Court	
1958	Il bacio del sole (Don Vesuvio)	Il vescovo	
1959	Le confident de ces dames	Le président	
1959	Avventura in città		
1961	Constantine and the Cross	Amodius	Uncredited
1961	Blood Feud	Burlando	
1961	Un figlio d'oggi	Orafo	
1963	Un marito in condominio	Enea	
1966	La volpe e le camelie		
1967	On My Way to the Crusades, I Met a Girl Who...	Eremita	

== Voice work ==
Year	Title	Role	Notes
1949	The Rose of Baghdad	The Grand Kadi	Animated film
1972	The Adventures of Pinocchio	Talking Cricket	Animated film (posthumous release)

=== Dubbing ===
==== Films (Animation, Italian dub) ====
Year	Title	Role(s)	Ref
1938	Snow White and the Seven Dwarfs	Bashful	
1948	Dumbo	Dandy Crow	
1951	Alice in Wonderland	White Rabbit	
1955	Lady and the Tramp	Jock	
1961	One Hundred and One Dalmatians	Scottie	
1962	Arabian Nights: Sinbad's Adventures	Captain	
1963	The Sword in the Stone	Archimedes	
1966	Winnie the Pooh and the Honey Tree	Rabbit	
1967	Asterix the Gaul	Cacofonix	
1968	Winnie the Pooh and the Blustery Day	Rabbit	
1968	Bambi	Friend Owl (1968 redub)	

==== Films (Live action, Italian dub) ====
Year	Title	Role(s)	Original actor	Ref
1946	It's a Wonderful Life	Mr. Emil Gower	H. B. Warner	
1964	Mary Poppins	Mr. Dawes Jr.	Arthur Malet	
