= Cavalry (1936 Italian film) =

1936 film

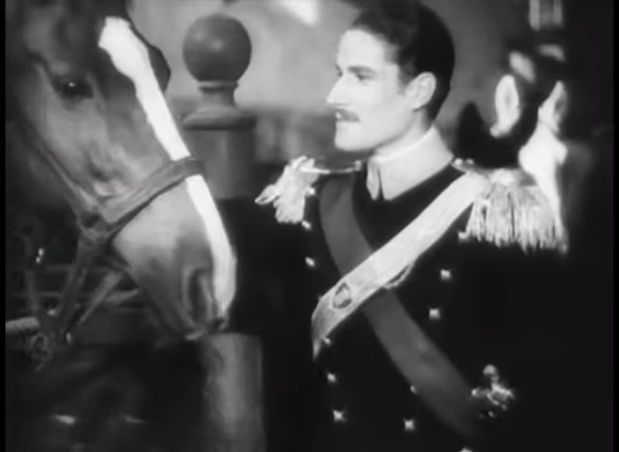
- Nazzari in a film scene
- Directed by: Goffredo Alessandrini
- Written by: Salvatore Gotta; Oreste Biancoli; Fulvio Palmieri; Aldo Vergano
- Starring: Amedeo Nazzari; Elisa Cegani; Luigi Carini; Mario Ferrari
- Cinematography: Václav Vích
- Edited by: Giorgio Simonelli
- Music by: Enzo Masetti
- Production company: ICI
- Distributed by: Lux Film
- Release date: 23 October 1936
- Running time: 88 minutes
- Country: Italy
- Language: Italian

Cavalry (Italian: Cavalleria) is a 1936 Italian drama film directed by Goffredo Alessandrini and starring Amedeo Nazzari, Elisa Cegani and Luigi Carini. The film marked Nazzari's first role as a lead actor, after making his film debut the previous year. It was a box office success and established some of his personal traits that would be brought out even more clearly in his breakthrough role Luciano Serra, Pilot (1938).

== Synopsis ==
Umberto Solaro, a young cavalry officer, falls in love with a Piedmont Count's daughter. They develop a romantic attachment, but she marries an Austrian baron under family pressure. After his horse dies in an accident during a completion, Solaro transfers into the newly formed Italian Air Force. He falls heroically in combat during the First World War.

== Cast ==
- Amedeo Nazzari as Umberto Solaro
- Elisa Cegani as Speranza di Frassineto
- Luigi Carini as Speranza's father
- Mario Ferrari as Alberto Ponza
- Enrico Viarisio as Sottotenente Rolla
- Clara Padoa as Countess Clotilde, Speranza's mother
- Silvana Jachino as Carlotta di Frasseneto
- Adolfo Geri as Vittorio di Frasseneto
- Ernst Nadherny as Baron of Austria
- Anna Magnani as Fanny
- Nora D'Alba as Countess Sandi
- Silvio Bagolini as Attendant Bagolini
- Fausto Guerzoni as Other Attendant
- Oreste Fares as The Doctor
- Umberto Casilini as Member of the Union Circle
- Walter Grant as Superior Official
- Cecyl Tryan as Lady of Torino's Aristocracy
- Michele Malaspina as Cavalry Officer
- Albino Principe as Carlotta's Husband
- Rosina Adrario as Countess Adrari

== See also ==
- List of films about horses

== Bibliography ==
- Gundle, Stephen. Mussolini's Dream Factory: Film Stardom in Fascist Italy. Berghahn Books, 2013.
