= Beyond Love (film) =

1940 film directed by Carmine Gallone

- Directed by: Carmine Gallone
- Written by: Guido Cantini
- Based on: Vanina Vanini by Stendhal
- Starring: Alida Valli; Amedeo Nazzari; Osvaldo Valenti
- Cinematography: Anchise Brizzi
- Edited by: Oswald Hafenrichter
- Music by: Alessandro Cicognini
- Production company: Grandi Film
- Distributed by: ICI
- Release dates: 2 September 1940 (Venice); March 1941 (Italy)
- Running time: 96 minutes
- Country: Italy
- Language: Italian

Beyond Love (Italian: Oltre l'amore) is a 1940 Italian historical drama film directed by Carmine Gallone and starring Alida Valli, Amedeo Nazzari and Osvaldo Valenti. It is based on the 1829 novella Vanina Vanini by Stendhal.

It was shot at Cinecittà Studios in Rome. The film's sets were designed by the art directors Guido Fiorini and Ivo Battelli.

== Cast ==
- Alida Valli as Vanina Vanini
- Amedeo Nazzari as Pietro Mirilli
- Camillo Pilotto as Il duca Vanini
- Osvaldo Valenti as Livio Sabelli
- Germaine Aussey as Maria Talleschi
- Lamberto Picasso as Meschiori
- Lauro Gazzolo as Il conte Sabelli-Catanzaro, ministro di polizia
- Amina Pirani Maggi as Elisa
- Carlo Bressan as Santucci
- Emilio Cigoli as Ippoliti
- Romolo Costa as Un carbonaro
- Claudio Ermelli as Una Spia
- Oreste Fares as Padre Notari
- Augusto Marcacci as Il segretario del ministro di polizia

== Bibliography ==
- Nowell-Smith, Geoffrey. The Companion to Italian Cinema. Cassell, 1996.
