= Violets in Their Hair =

1942 film

- Directed by: Carlo Ludovico Bragaglia
- Written by: Carlo Ludovico Bragaglia; Silvano Castellani; Alessandro De Stefani; Luciana Peverelli
- Based on: Violets in Their Hair by Luciana Peverelli
- Produced by: Walter Mocchi; Sergio Pastorini; Lorenzo Pegoraro
- Starring: Lilia Silvi; Irasema Dilián; Carla Del Poggio
- Cinematography: Giuseppe La Torre
- Edited by: Ines Donarelli
- Music by: Edgardo Carducci
- Production companies: Fono Roma; Lux Film
- Distributed by: Lux Film
- Release date: 6 June 1942
- Running time: 85 minutes
- Country: Italy
- Language: Italian

Violets in Their Hair (Italian: Violette nei capelli) is a 1942 Italian comedy drama film directed by Carlo Ludovico Bragaglia and starring Lilia Silvi, Irasema Dilián and Carla Del Poggio. It was based on a novel of the same title by Luciana Peverelli. It was shot at the Cinecittà Studios in Rome. The film's sets were designed by the art directors Piero Filippone and Mario Rappini.

== Cast ==
- Lilia Silvi as Carina
- Irasema Dilián as Oliva
- Carla Del Poggio as Mirella
- Roberto Villa as Giuliano
- Emma Giglio as Alda
- Carlo Campanini as Evaristo Pelliccioni
- Enzo Biliotti as Il professore Mattei
- Carlo Minello as Un giovanetto invitato al ballo
- Aristide Baghetti a s Colucci
- Ada Dondini as Amalia, l'attrice della filodrammatica
- Giuseppe Addobbati as Il direttore d'orchestra
- Pina Gallini as La sarta
- Luigi Scarabello as Giorgio
- Loris Gizzi as Il padre di Alda

== Bibliography ==
- Bondanella, Peter (ed.) The Italian Cinema Book. Bloomsbury Publishing, 2019.
- Goble, Alan. The Complete Index to Literary Sources in Film. Walter de Gruyter, 1999.
- Reich, Jacqueline Beth. Fascism, Film, and Female Subjectivity: The Case of Italian Cinema 1936-1943. University of California, Berkeley, 1994.
