= Amina Pirani Maggi =

Italian stage and film actress

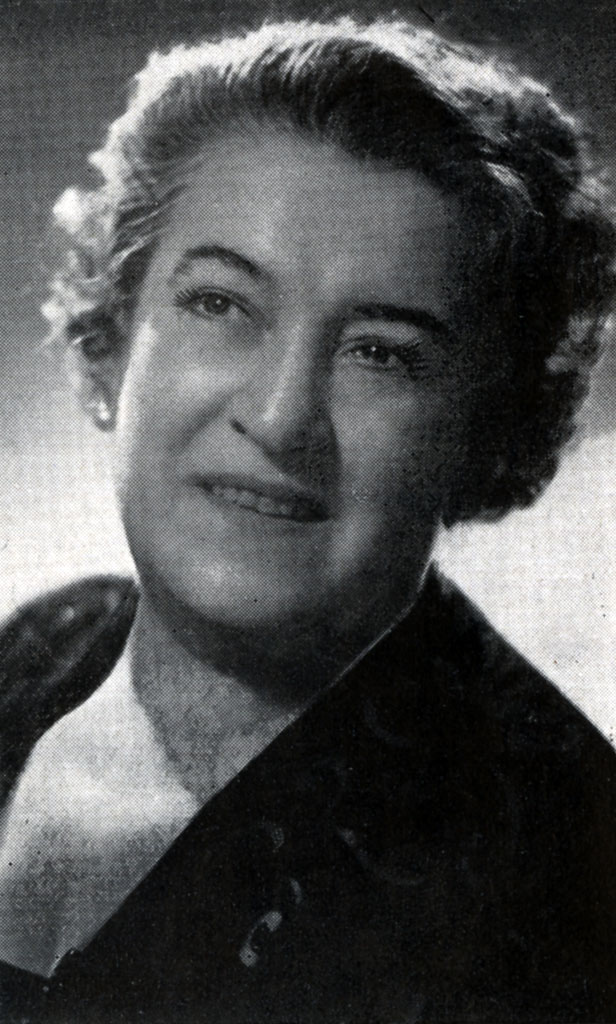
- Maggi in 1954
- Born: Amina Pirani Maggi; 15 January 1892; Verona, Veneto, Italy
- Died: 10 November 1979 (aged 87); Rome, Lazio, Italy
- Occupation: Actress
- Years active: 1931–1965

Amina Pirani Maggi (15 January 1892 – 10 November 1979) was an Italian stage and film actress.

== Selected filmography ==
- Television (1931)
- Seconda B (1934)
- Dimmed Lights (1934)
- Like the Leaves (1935)
- Department Store (1939)
- Guest for One Night (1939)
- A Thousand Lire a Month (1939)
- Beyond Love (1940)
- Lucrezia Borgia (1940)
- Manon Lescaut (1940)
- The King's Jester (1941)
- The Hero of Venice (1941)
- Luisa Sanfelice (1942)
- Girl of the Golden West (1942)
- Love Story (1942)
- Once a Week (1942)
- The Black Panther (1942)
- Rita of Cascia (1943)
- A Living Statue (1943)
- The Innocent Casimiro (1945)
- Be Seeing You, Father (1948)
- Ring Around the Clock (1950)
- The Beggar's Daughter (1950)
- Who Is Without Sin (1952)
- If You Won a Hundred Million (1953)
- The Knight of the Black Sword (1956)

== Bibliography ==
- Waldman, Harry. Missing Reels: Lost Films of American and European Cinema. McFarland, 2000.
