= Fatal Symphony =

1947 film

- Directed by: Victor Stoloff
- Written by: Oreste Biancoli; Louis Golding; Victor Stoloff
- Starring: Douglass Montgomery; Marina Berti; Sarah Churchill
- Cinematography: Ubaldo Arata
- Music by: Renzo Rossellini
- Production company: Scalera Film
- Distributed by: Scalera Film
- Release date: May 1947
- Running time: 91 minutes
- Country: Italy
- Language: Italian

Fatal Symphony (Italian: Sinfonia fatale) is a 1947 Italian war-melodrama film directed by Victor Stoloff and starring Douglass Montgomery, Marina Berti and Sarah Churchill. It was screened and awarded a prize at the Lugano Festival.

It was shot at the Scalera Studios in Rome. The film's sets were designed by the art directors Ottavio Scotti and Vittorio Valentini.

== Plot ==
Before the Second World War an American composer, separated from his wife, comes to live in Italy and falls in love with a country girl.

== Cast ==
- Douglass Montgomery as John Savage
- Marina Berti as Mirella
- Sarah Churchill as Mrs. Savage
- Tullio Carminati as Pedro Diaz
- Victor Rietti as Beppo
- Carlo Romano as Giorgio
- John Blythe as pittore Pierre Robert
- Cesare Fantoni as sacerdote
- Pina Gallini as Nunziata, moglie di Beppo
- Claudio Gora as Rodolfo Marini
- Sergio Capogna as Rocco
- Renzo Merusi as tenore d'Errico
- Giuseppe Pierozzi as impiegato galleria d'arte
- Pina Piovani as Lina, moglie di Pedro
- Kent Walton as Teddy Malone
- Guido Celano
- Diego Pozzetto
- William Tubbs
- Nino Javert

== Bibliography ==
- Mary S. Lovell. The Churchills: In Love and War. W. W. Norton & Company, 2012.
