= Father's Dilemma =

- Directed by: Alessandro Blasetti
- Written by: Cesare Zavattini; Alessandro Blasetti; Suso Cecchi d'Amico
- Starring: Aldo Fabrizi
- Cinematography: Mario Craveri
- Edited by: Mario Serandrei
- Music by: Alessandro Cicognini
- Release date: 1950
- Country: Italy
- Language: Italian

Father's Dilemma (Italian: Prima comunione) is a 1950 Italian comedy film directed by Alessandro Blasetti. It won an award at the Venice Film Festival. In 2008, the film was included on the Italian Ministry of Cultural Heritage’s 100 Italian films to be saved, a list of 100 films that "have changed the collective memory of the country between 1942 and 1978."

== Details ==
- The voice of the narrator is Alberto Sordi. When Sordi worked on the film he had just finished dubbing the Atoll K with main characters Laurel and Hardy.
- Various sequences of the Italian neo-realist film Prima Comunione were filmed on the exterior double stair of the Church of Santi Domenico e Sisto, the university church of the Pontifical University of Saint Thomas Aquinas, Angelicum.
- Prima comunione has been put on the list of the 100 Italian films to be saved.

== Cast ==
- Aldo Fabrizi as Mr. Carloni
- Gaby Morlay as Maria Carloni
- Ludmilla Dudarova as Signorina Ludovisi
- Lucien Baroux as The Archbishop
- Enrico Viarisio as L'uomo del filobus
- Andreina Mazzotto as Anna Carloni
- Adriana Gallandt as Antonia, la cameriera
- Ernesto Almirante as L'invitato anziano
- Aldo Silvani as Inquilino con scarpe rumorose
- Lauro Gazzolo as Cliente che compro l'uovo pasquale
- Max Elloy as Lo spazzino
- Jean Tissier as Il medico sul taxi
- Amedeo Trilli as Il vigile urbano (as Amedeo Novelli)
- Dante Maggio as Metropolitano che regola il trafico
- Carlo Romano as Il tassista
