= House of Ricordi =

1954 film directed by Carmine Gallone

- Film poster
- Directed by: Carmine Gallone
- Written by: Leonardo Benvenuti; Luigi Filippo D'Amico; Vittorio Nino Novarese; Furio Scarpelli; Agenore Incrocci; Carmine Gallone
- Produced by: Raymond Froment; Jacques Bar; Gianni Hecht Lucari
- Starring: Märta Torén; Marcello Mastroianni; Micheline Presle
- Cinematography: Marco Scarpelli
- Edited by: Niccolò Lazzari
- Music by: Renzo Rossellini, Gioachino Rossini, Giuseppe Verdi, Giacomo Puccini, Gaetano Donizetti and Vincenzo Bellini
- Production companies: Diana Cinematografica; Documento Film; Industrie Cinematografiche Sociali; Cormoran Films; Franco London Films; Le Louvre Film
- Distributed by: Minerva Film (Italy); Cinédis (France)
- Release date: 1 December 1954
- Running time: 110 minutes
- Countries: France; Italy
- Language: Italian

House of Ricordi (Italian: Casa Ricordi) is a 1954 French-Italian historical biographical melodrama film based on the early history of the Italian music publishing house Casa Ricordi. It is directed by Carmine Gallone and stars Märta Torén, Marcello Mastroianni and Micheline Presle. The Ricordi family's interactions with many of the great composers of the nineteenth century are portrayed. The film's sets were designed by Mario Chiari. It was shot at the Cinecittà Studios and on location in Milan, Paris and Rome.

== Main cast ==
- Roland Alexandre as Gioacchino Rossini
- Myriam Bru as Luisa Lewis
- Elisa Cegani as Giuseppina Strepponi
- Andrea Checchi as Giulio Ricordi
- Danièle Delorme as Maria
- Gabriele Ferzetti as Giacomo Puccini
- Fosco Giachetti as Giuseppe Verdi
- Renzo Giovampietro as Tito Ricordi
- Nadia Gray as Giulia Grisi
- Roldano Lupi as Domenico Barbaja
- Marcello Mastroianni as Gaetano Donizetti
- Micheline Presle as Virginia Marchi
- Maurice Ronet as Vincenzo Bellini
- Paolo Stoppa as Giovanni Ricordi
- Märta Torén as Isabella Colbran (credited as Marta Toren)
- Fausto Tozzi as Arrigo Boito
- Julien Carette as Felix
- Memmo Carotenuto as lo stuccatore
- Lauro Gazzolo as carrettiere di Casa Ricordi
- Renato Malavasi as Ambrogi
- Aldo Ronconi as tenor Maselli
- Vira Silenti as Marietta Ricordi
- Aldo Silvani as Bellini's doctor
- Sergio Tofano as Cesarini Sforza
- Antoine Balpêtré as Dr. Fleury
- Nelly Corradi
- Claudio Ermelli
