= The Innocent Casimiro =

1945 film directed by Carlo Campogalliani

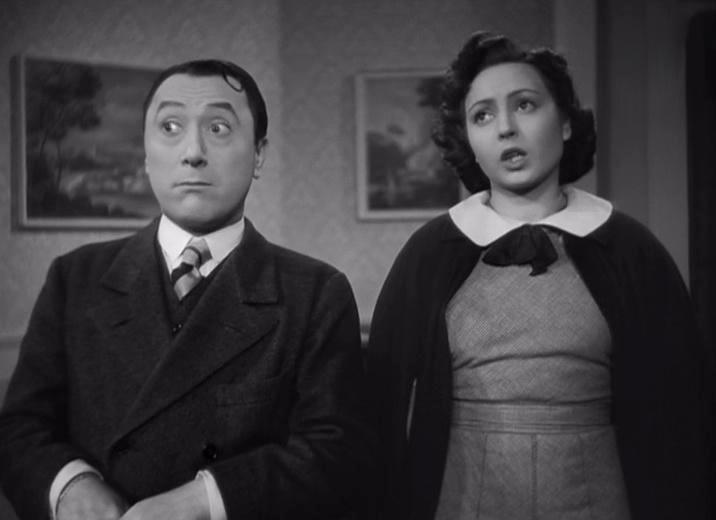
- Theatrical film poster
- Italian: L'innocente Casimiro
- Directed by: Carlo Campogalliani
- Written by: Carlo Campogalliani; Vincenzo Rovi
- Starring: Erminio Macario; Lea Padovani; Olinto Cristina
- Cinematography: Ubaldo Arata
- Edited by: Eraldo Da Roma
- Music by: Eldo Di Lazzaro
- Production company: A.R.S. Società Produzioni Cinematografiche
- Distributed by: Lux Film
- Release date: October 1945
- Running time: 83 minutes
- Country: Italy
- Language: Italian

The Innocent Casimiro (Italian: L'innocente Casimiro) is a 1945 Italian comedy film directed by Carlo Campogalliani and starring Erminio Macario, Lea Padovani and Olinto Cristina. It is based on a play Scandalo al Collegio by Mario Amendola, and was mainly shot in 1943. However it was disrupted by wartime events and was not released until 1945. It was the first release to be distributed by Lux Film following the Liberation. Critics were generally disappointed with the film, made in the traditional pre-war style of "schoolgirl comedies".

The film's sets were designed by the art directors Gastone Medin and Gino Brosio.

== Cast ==
- Erminio Macario as Casimiro Pelagatti
- Lea Padovani as Marcella
- Olinto Cristina as principal
- Enzo Biliotti as Dr. Raglia
- Ada Dondini as Zia Tecla
- Adriana Facchetti a Miss Pannelli
- Baby Donall as Paola
- Lauro Gazzolo as Pietro
- Loris Gizzi as Gustavo Corra
- Alberto Sordi as Corra's driver
- Adriana Serra as Silvia
- Paola Veneroni as Emilia
- Vinicio Sofia as Professor Polpettone
- Amina Pirani Maggi as Casimiro's mother
- Giuseppe Pierozzi as the Chadian ding dinger
- Letizia Quaranta as Countess Rosselli
