= Carlo Romano =

Italian actor (1908–1975)

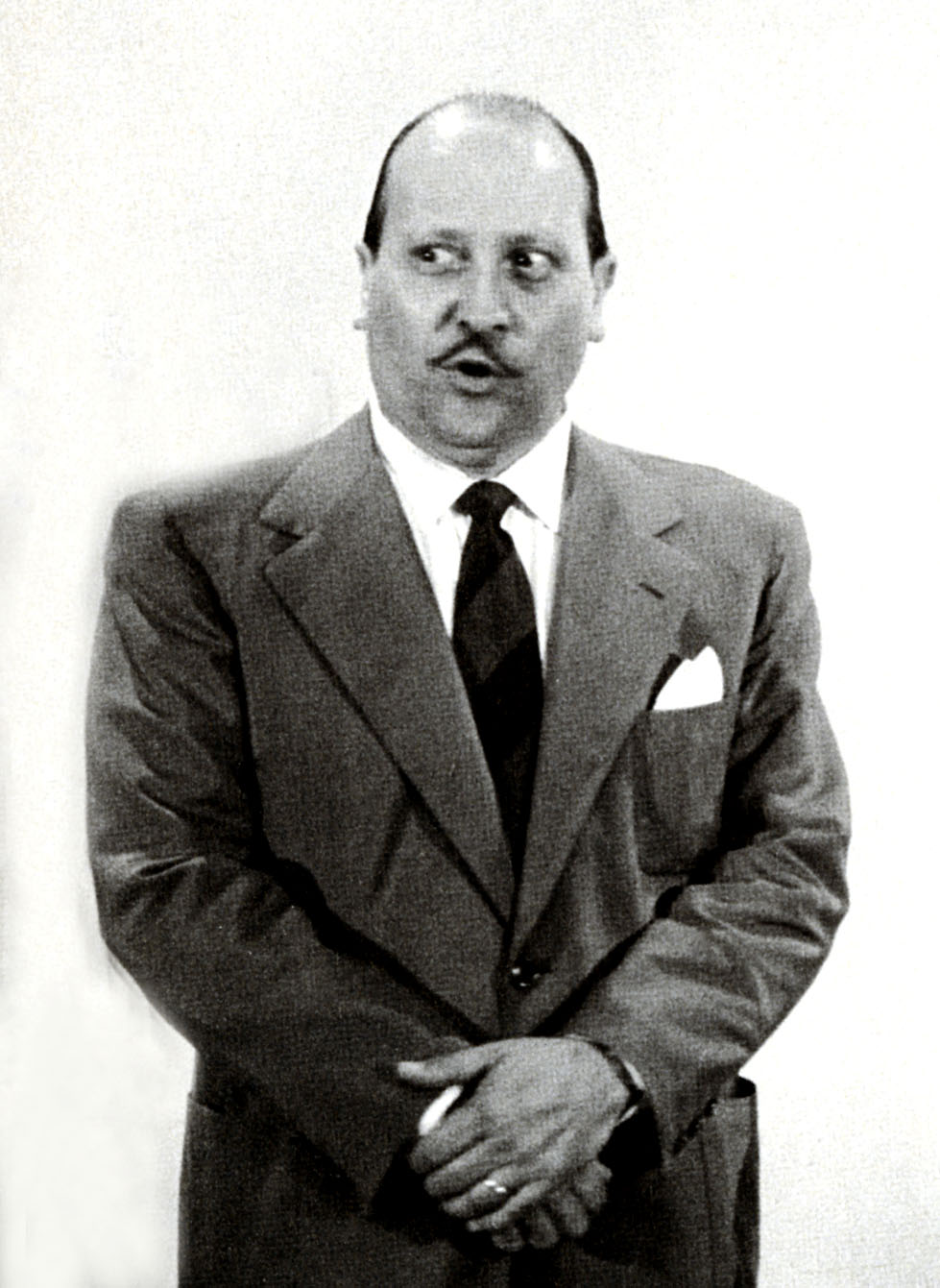
- Romano in 1961
- Born: 9 May 1908; Livorno, Italy
- Died: 16 October 1975 (aged 67); Rome, Italy
- Occupations: Actor; voice actor; screenwriter
- Years active: 1927–1975
- Spouse(s): Jone Romano (m. 1933; died 1961) Liliana de Stefano
- Children: 5
- Mother: Dina Romano
- Relatives: Felice Romano (brother); Aleardo Ward (stepson); Luca Ward (step-grandson); Andrea Ward (step-grandson); Monica Ward (step-granddaughter)

Carlo Romano (9 May 1908 – 16 October 1975) was an Italian actor, voice actor and screenwriter.

== Biography ==
Born in Livorno, Romano was the son of actress Dina Romano and the younger brother of actor Felice Romano. Romano started his acting career on stage in 1927. During World War II, he committed himself to starring mainly in revues, and he remained active in cinema, theatre, radio and television. In 1939, Romano began his radio acting career. He appeared in 94 films between 1934 and 1975. He also wrote for 14 films between 1955 and 1975. Among his most popular films include Four Steps in the Clouds and he also portrayed composer Ruggero Leoncavallo in the film I pagliacci.

Romano was also a famous voice actor, most notably the Italian voice of Don Camillo (played by French actor Fernandel), and he was the official Italian voice of Jerry Lewis, Bob Hope and Lou Costello. Other actors he dubbed included Louis de Funès, Jack Oakie, Edward Andrews, Fred Astaire, James Cagney, Peter Lorre, Ernest Borgnine, Peter Ustinov, Eli Wallach, Rod Steiger and Lloyd Corrigan. He also teamed up with Lauro Gazzolo in the Italian dubbing of the Abbott and Costello sketches. In his animated film roles, Romano voiced several characters in the Italian dubs of Disney films. These include Jiminy Cricket in Pinocchio, The Mad Hatter in Alice in Wonderland and the Sheriff of Nottingham in Robin Hood.

=== Personal life ===
Through his marriage to actress Jone Romano, he was the stepfather of actor Aleardo Ward and the step-grandfather of voice actors Luca, Andrea and Monica Ward. He also had five children from his second marriage.

Romano died in Rome on 16 October 1975, at the age of 67.

== Selected filmography ==
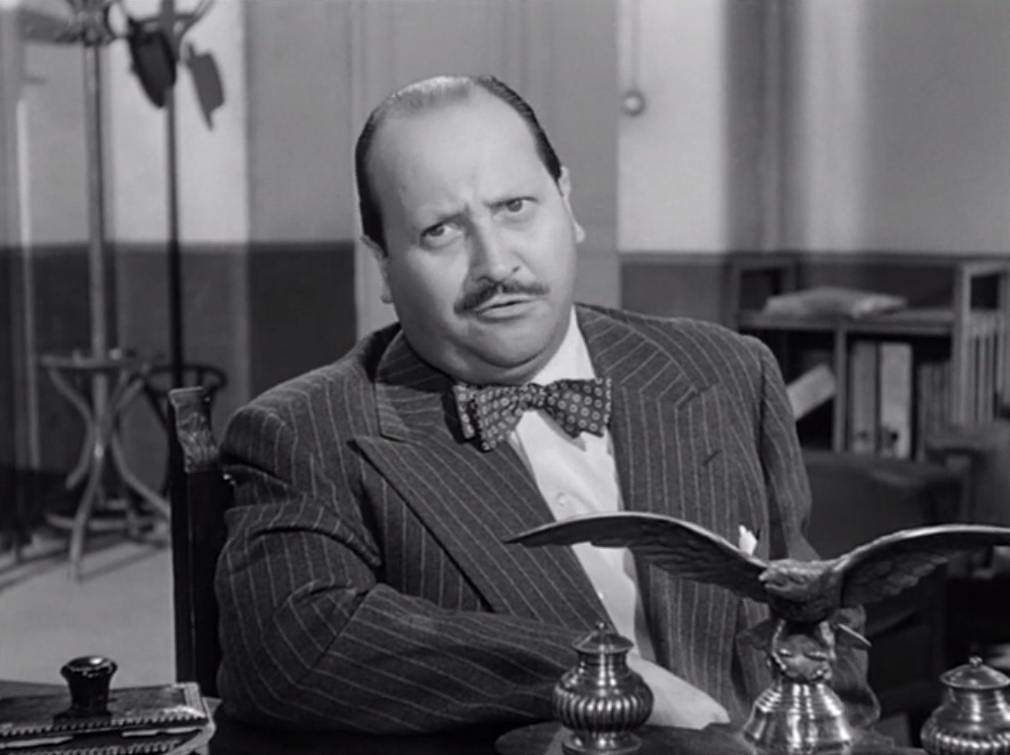
Romano in It Happened at the Police Station (1954)

- The Last Adventure (1932) - Don Gaetano - il notaio
- Everybody's Woman (1934) - Un autista di taxi (uncredited)
- L'avvocato difensore (1935)
- Il re Burlone (1936)
- Tredici uomini e un cannone (1936) - Uomo #4
- Under the Southern Cross (1938) - Un altro operaio della piantagione
- Giuseppe Verdi (1938) - L'uomo dei soldi
- Departure (1938) - Giulio
- L'argine (1938) - L'avvocato di John
- La voce senza volto (1939) - Maurizio Sala, il tenore
- The Sons of the Marquis Lucera (1939) - Il 'terzo' figlio
- I, His Father (1939) - Giorgio
- Le sorprese del divorzio (1939) - Champeaux
- Father For a Night (1939) - Agostino
- Follie del secolo (1939) - Carlo Benac
- Cavalleria rusticana (1939) - Bammulu
- The Silent Partner (1939) - Prado
- Bridge of Glass (1940) - Leone
- The Hussar Captain (1940)
- Senza cielo (1940) - Roberto Giannini
- Il sogno di tutti (1940) - Aldo
- A Husband for the Month of April (1941) - Giovanni
- L'elisir d'amore (1941) - Belcore
- Pia de' Tolomei (1941) - Leone
- Scampolo (1941) - Gerardo Bernini
- Oro nero (1942)
- The Adventures of Fra Diavolo (1942) - Tiburzio
- Arriviamo noi! (1942) - Il secondo gestorio del "castello delle streghe"
- Giarabub (1942) - Il maresciallo Romano
- Perdizione (1942) - Augusto
- M.A.S. (1942) - Un marinaio nella taverna
- The Taming of the Shrew (1942) - Remo
- Forbidden Music (1942) - Otello
- Sette anni di felicità (1942) - José, l'allevatore di tori
- Four Steps in the Clouds (1942) - Antonio - l'autista della corriera
- Piazza San Sepolcro (1942)
- Laugh, Pagliacci (1943) - Ruggero Leoncavallo
- Redenzione (1943)
- Il treno crociato (1943) - Stefano Pucci, l'attendente
- Anything for a Song (1943)
- The Ten Commandments (1945) - (segment "Non rubare")
- Life Begins Anew (1945) - Croci
- Lettere al sottotenente (1945)
- La casa senza tempo (1945) - Giovanni
- Fuga nella tempesta (1945)
- The Adulteress (1946) - Il fattore
- Il mondo vuole così (1946) - Avvocato Verdini
- Fatal Symphony (1947)
- When Love Calls (1947) - Maestro Marconi
- Alarm Bells (1949) - Il maresciallo
- Ho sognato il paradiso (1950)
- Cavalcade of Heroes (1950) - Paolo Tassoni
- Father's Dilemma (1950) - Il tassista
- Tomorrow Is Too Late (1950) - Signor Berardi
- Strano appuntamento (1950)
- Variety Lights (1950) - Enzo La Rosa
- Beauties on Bicycles (1951) - Darelli - direttore fabbrica bicicletta
- Arrivano i nostri (1951) - Comm. Garlandi
- Toto the Third Man (1951) - Il commendatore Buttafava Borelli
- My Heart Sings (1951) - Commendator Russo
- What Price Innocence? (1952) - Don Settimio
- Torment of the Past (1952) - Marco Ferretti
- Beauties in Capri (1952) - Vittorio
- Five Paupers in an Automobile (1952) - Rodolfo
- Melody of Love (1952) - Commendator Ferrario
- Primo premio: Mariarosa (1952)
- Cats and Dogs (1952) - Don Saverio
- La domenica della buona gente (1953) - Malesci
- Le infedeli (1953) - Commendator Giovanni Azzali
- Jeunes mariés (1953) - Virgile, le coiffeur
- I vitelloni (1953) - Michele Curti
- Fermi tutti... arrivo io! (1953) - Commissario Benni
- Via Padova 46 (1953) - Narrator (uncredited)
- The Most Wanted Man (1953) - (uncredited)
- Siamo ricchi e poveri (1953) - Mr. Fortini
- Of Life and Love (1954) - Carlo Migri (segment "Marsina Stretta")
- The Beach (1954) - Luigi
- It Happened at the Police Station (1954) - Thief's victim
- A Parisian in Rome (1954) - Narrator (uncredited)
- Cardinal Lambertini (1954) - Goffredo di Pietramelara
- Tears of Love (1954)
- Accadde al penitenziario (1955) - Capo degli agenti di custodia
- Addio per sempre! (1958)
- The Friend of the Jaguar (1959) - Il commendatore
- Ciao, ciao bambina! (1959) - Remigio Marchetti - la moglie di Marchetti
- Le cameriere (1959) - Zio di Monica
- Wolves of the Deep (1959)
- Le ambiziose (1961) - Il presidente della giuria
- Carmen di Trastevere (1962) - Police Commissioner
- I due toreri (1964) - Joe Ragusa
- Indovina chi viene a merenda? (1969) - Otto Bauer
- The Balloon Vendor (1974) - Security Guard

== Voice work ==
Year	Title	Role	Notes
1949	La Rosa di Bagdad	Burk (singing voice)	Animated film
1963	La rabbia	Voice-over	Documentary film
1965	West and Soda	The Boss	Animated film
1972-1981	SuperGulp!	Nick Carter, Patsy	TV show
1975	King Dick	Magozio	Animated film
1976	Mr. Rossi Looks for Happiness	Mr. Rossi	Animated film (posthumous release)

=== Dubbing ===
==== Films (Animation, Italian dub) ====
Year	Title	Role(s)	Ref
1947	Pinocchio	Jiminy Cricket	
1950	Cinderella	Gus	
1950	Cinderella	The King (1967 redub)	
1951	Alice in Wonderland	The Mad Hatter	
1955	Lady and the Tramp	Beaver	
1964	Hey There, It's Yogi Bear!	Ranger Smith	
1967	Asterix the Gaul	Caius Bonus	
1967	The Jungle Book	Buzzie	
1971	Bedknobs and Broomsticks	Secretary Bird	
1972	The Three Musketeers in Boots	Mayor	
1973	Robin Hood	Sheriff of Nottingham	

==== Films (Live action, Italian dub) ====
Year	Title	Role(s)	Original actor	Ref
1946	It's a Wonderful Life	Sam Wainwright	Frank Albertson	
1947	Road to Rio	Hot Lips Barton	Bob Hope	
1952	Little World of Don Camillo	Don Camillo	Fernandel	
1953	The Return of Don Camillo	Don Camillo	Fernandel	
1954	Johnny Guitar	Bart Lonergan	Ernest Borgnine	
1955	Don Camillo's Last Round	Don Camillo	Fernandel	
1961	Don Camillo: Monsignor	Don Camillo	Fernandel	
1965	Don Camillo in Moscow	Don Camillo	Fernandel	
1966	The Good, the Bad and the Ugly	Tuco Ramírez	Eli Wallach	
1968	Don't Raise the Bridge, Lower the River	George Lester	Jerry Lewis	
