= Gastone Medin =

Dalmatian Italian art director

- Born: 6 July 1905; Split, Austro-Hungarian Empire
- Died: 1973 (aged 67–68); Rome, Lazio, Italy
- Occupation: Art director
- Years active: 1929–1961 (film)

Gastone Medin (1905–1973) was a Dalmatian Italian art director. He worked on more than a hundred and fifty films during his career.

== Selected filmography ==
- Figaro and His Great Day (1931)
- Lowered Sails (1931)
- The Table of the Poor (1932)
- La Wally (1932)
- The Last Adventure (1932)
- What Scoundrels Men Are! (1932)
- Your Money or Your Life (1932)
- Fanny (1933)
- I'll Always Love You (1933)
- Giallo (1933)
- The Missing Treaty (1933)
- Together in the Dark (1933)
- Stadium (1934)
- The Little Schoolmistress (1934)
- The Wedding March (1934)
- Full Speed (1934)
- I Love You Only (1935)
- Golden Arrow (1935)
- Joe the Red (1936)
- The Carnival Is Here Again (1937)
- The Two Mothers (1938)
- I Want to Live with Letizia (1938)
- The Document (1939)
- Frenzy (1939)
- Heartbeat (1939)
- Backstage (1939)
- A Romantic Adventure (1940)
- Two on a Vacation (1940)
- The Happy Ghost (1941)
- The Taming of the Shrew (1942)
- Once a Week (1942)
- Love Story (1942)
- Farewell Love! (1943)
- Life Is Beautiful (1943)
- I'll Always Love You (1943)
- The Innocent Casimiro (1945)
- Eugenia Grandet (1946)
- Rome, Free City (1946)
- Biraghin (1946)
- Fire Over the Sea (1947)
- The Lady of the Camellias (1947)
- Christmas at Camp 119 (1948)
- The Force of Destiny (1950)
- His Last Twelve Hours (1951)
- Messalina (1951)
- Bread, Love and Dreams (1953)
- Fatal Desire (1953)
- Anna of Brooklyn (1958)

== Bibliography ==
- Anile, Alberto. Orson Welles in Italy. Indiana University Press, 2013.
