= Pina Gallini =

Italian actress (1888–1974)

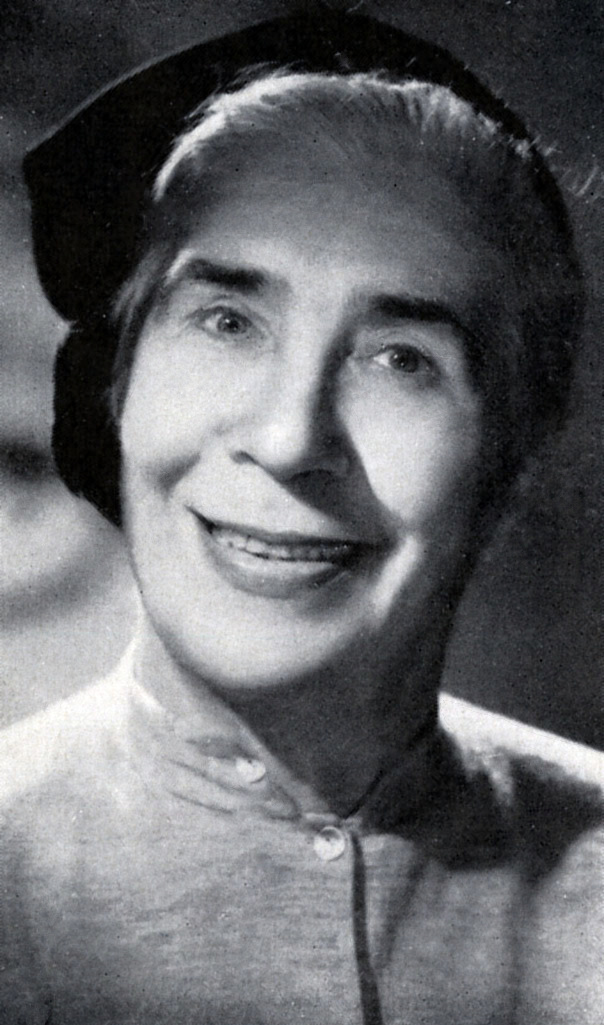
- Born: 19 March 1888; Bondeno, Ferrara, Kingdom of Italy
- Died: 31 January 1974 (aged 85); Bologna, Italy
- Occupation: Actress
- Years active: 1935–1963

Pina Gallini (19 March 1888 – 31 January 1974) was an Italian film actress. She appeared in 82 films between 1935 and 1963.

== Selected filmography ==
- The Countess of Parma (1936)
- The Ferocious Saladin (1937)
- The Former Mattia Pascal (1937)
- Unjustified Absence (1939)
- The Document (1939)
- Mad Animals (1939)
- The Hotel of the Absent (1939)
- The Document (1939)
- The Boarders at Saint-Cyr (1939)
- Guest for One Night (1939)
- Heartbeat (1939)
- The Hussar Captain (1940)
- The Hero of Venice (1941)
- The Taming of the Shrew (1942)
- Four Steps in the Clouds (1942)
- Alone at Last (1942)
- Before the Postman (1942)
- Violets in Their Hair (1942)
- Music on the Run (1943)
- Fatal Symphony (1947)
- The Emperor of Capri (1949)
- How I Discovered America (1949)
- The Elusive Twelve (1950)
- Rapture (1950)
- The Beggar's Daughter (1950)
- Toto the Third Man (1951)
- Toto and the Women (1952)
- The Daughter of the Regiment (1953)
- Days of Love (1954)
- Laugh! Laugh! Laugh! (1954)
- Noi siamo le colonne (1956)
- Serenata a Maria (1957)
