= Mario Chiari =

Italian production designer

- Born: 14 July 1909; Florence, Italy
- Died: 8 April 1989 (aged 79); Rome, Italy
- Occupations: Production designer Art director
- Years active: 1940–1985

Mario Chiari (14 July 1909 – 8 April 1989) was an Italian production designer and art director. He was nominated for an Academy Award in the category Best Art Direction for the film Doctor Dolittle.

== Selected filmography ==
- Un giorno nella vita (1946)
- The Enemy (1952)
- At Sword's Edge (1952)
- Storm (1954)
- House of Ricordi (1954)
- Le notti bianche (1957)
- The Son of the Red Corsair (1959)
- Doctor Dolittle (1967)
- King Kong (1976)
