= Amedeo Nazzari =

Italian actor (1907–1979)

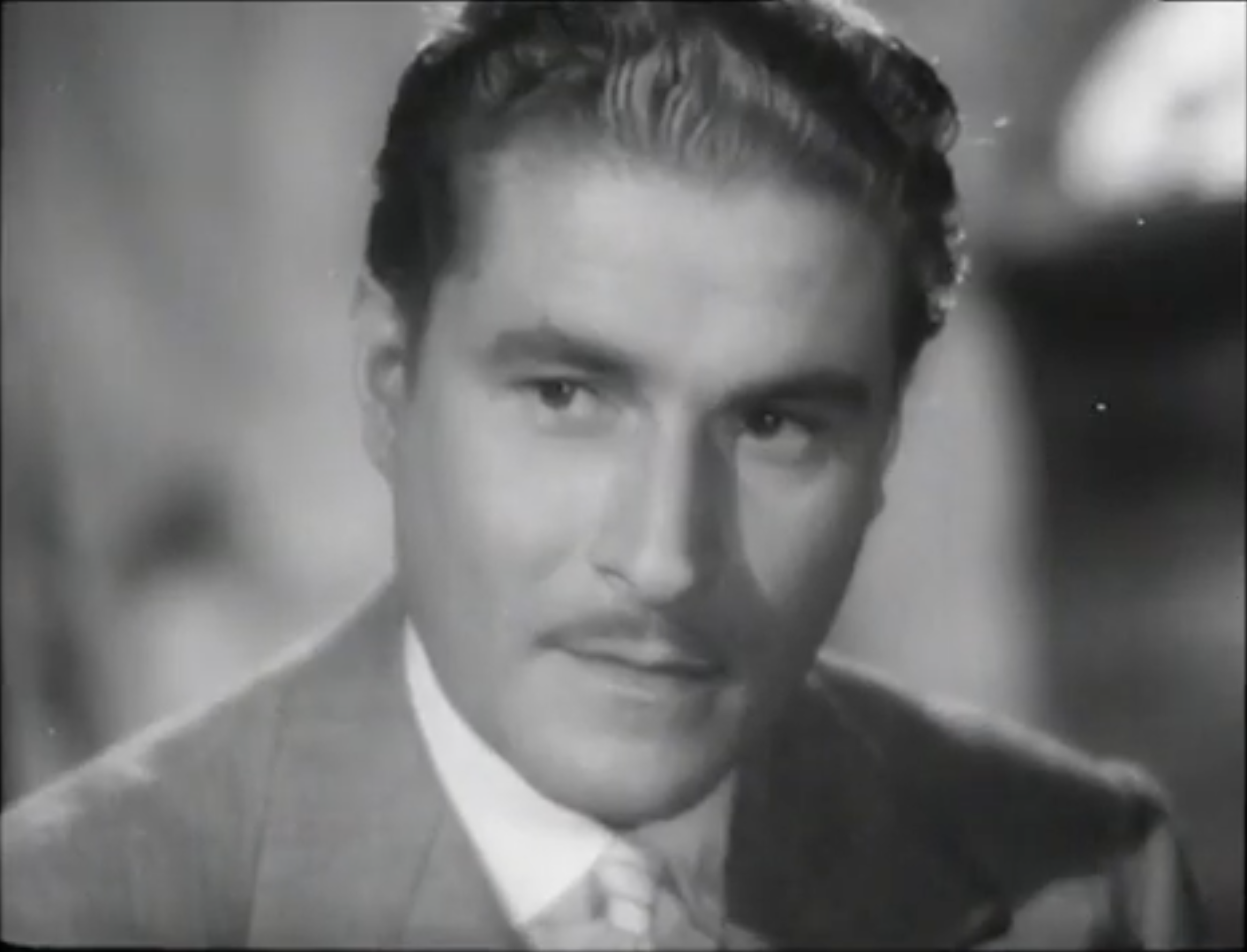
- Nazzari in Apparizione (1943)
- Born: Amedeo Carlo Leone Buffa; 10 December 1907; Cagliari, Kingdom of Italy
- Died: 5 November 1979 (aged 71); Rome, Italy
- Years active: 1936–1976
- Spouse: Irene Genna (1957–1979; his death) (1931–1986)

Amedeo Nazzari (10 December 1907 – 5 November 1979) was an Italian actor. Nazzari was one of the leading figures of Italian classic cinema, often considered a local variant of the Australian–American star Errol Flynn. Although he emerged as a star during the Fascist era, Nazzari's popularity continued well into the post-war years.

== Early career ==
Amedeo Nazzari was born as Amedeo Carlo Leone Buffa in Cagliari, Sardinia, Kingdom of Italy, in 1907 and he later adopted as his professional name the name of his maternal grandfather, Amedeo Nazzari, a magistrate who had been the president of the Court of Appeal of Vicenza in Veneto and later took the same position in Cagliari. Although Amedeo eventually moved to Rome, he always retained a slight trace of his native Sardinian accent. While Nazzari was keen on gaining film contracts much of his early experience was in the theatre. He entered a contest organised by Twentieth Century Fox to find an Italian actor to fill the boots of the recently deceased screen star Rudolph Valentino, but lost out to Alberto Rabagliati. He was rejected after screen tests by Italian professionals, who found him too tall, thin and thought he had a too gloomy expression.

Nazzari made his debut in Ginevra degli Almieri (1935), following a recommendation from Elsa Merlini. His first read role came with the 1936 film Cavalry, and he followed it up with The Castiglioni Brothers (1937). His breakthrough came with the 1938 film Luciano Serra, Pilot (1938) where he played a First World War veteran who returns to fight for Italy during the Abyssinian War. Nazzari was transformed into a matinee idol, the most bankable star of Italian cinema. Following the film, Nazzari was invited to join the Fascist Party by Benito Mussolini, but declined saying "Thank You Duce! I would prefer not to concern myself with politics, occupied as I am with more pressing artistic commitments".

== Stardom ==
Despite declining to join the Fascist party, Nazzari, along with a handful of other actors such as Fosco Giachetti, was considered one of exemplary male heroes. Most of his film roles from this point present him as a masculine (often military) figure. His emergence as a star coincided with a major drive by the Italian government to rebuild the country's film industry which had declined since its heyday in the silent era.

This policy involved large-scale government funding of films and the construction of the massive Cinecittà studio complex in Rome. The number of films produced each year climbed rapidly, with Nazzari a particularly prolific actor (making six films in 1939 and eight in 1941). During the era he worked with some of the leading Italian actresses including Alida Valli, Lilia Silvi, Luisa Ferida, Mariella Lotti, Assia Noris, Vera Carmi and Clara Calamai, often more than once.

Nazzari was almost always cast as a straightforward hero, and he closely protected his public persona to avoid any negative roles. An exception was the historical comedy-drama film The Jester's Supper (1942) in which he plays a loutish figure. Nazzari made four films with Alida Valli, including Unjustified Absence (1939).

Following Italy's entry into the Second World War in 1940, he combined romances and comedies, with occasional more propagandistic productions. Amongst the more political was Bengasi (1942), an anti-British war film set in Libya. Nazzari portrays an Italian patriot who masquerades as a collaborator with the British occupiers of Bengazi in order to steal their battle plans. It was the only time he featured alongside the other great male star of the era, Fosco Giachetti.

== Later career ==
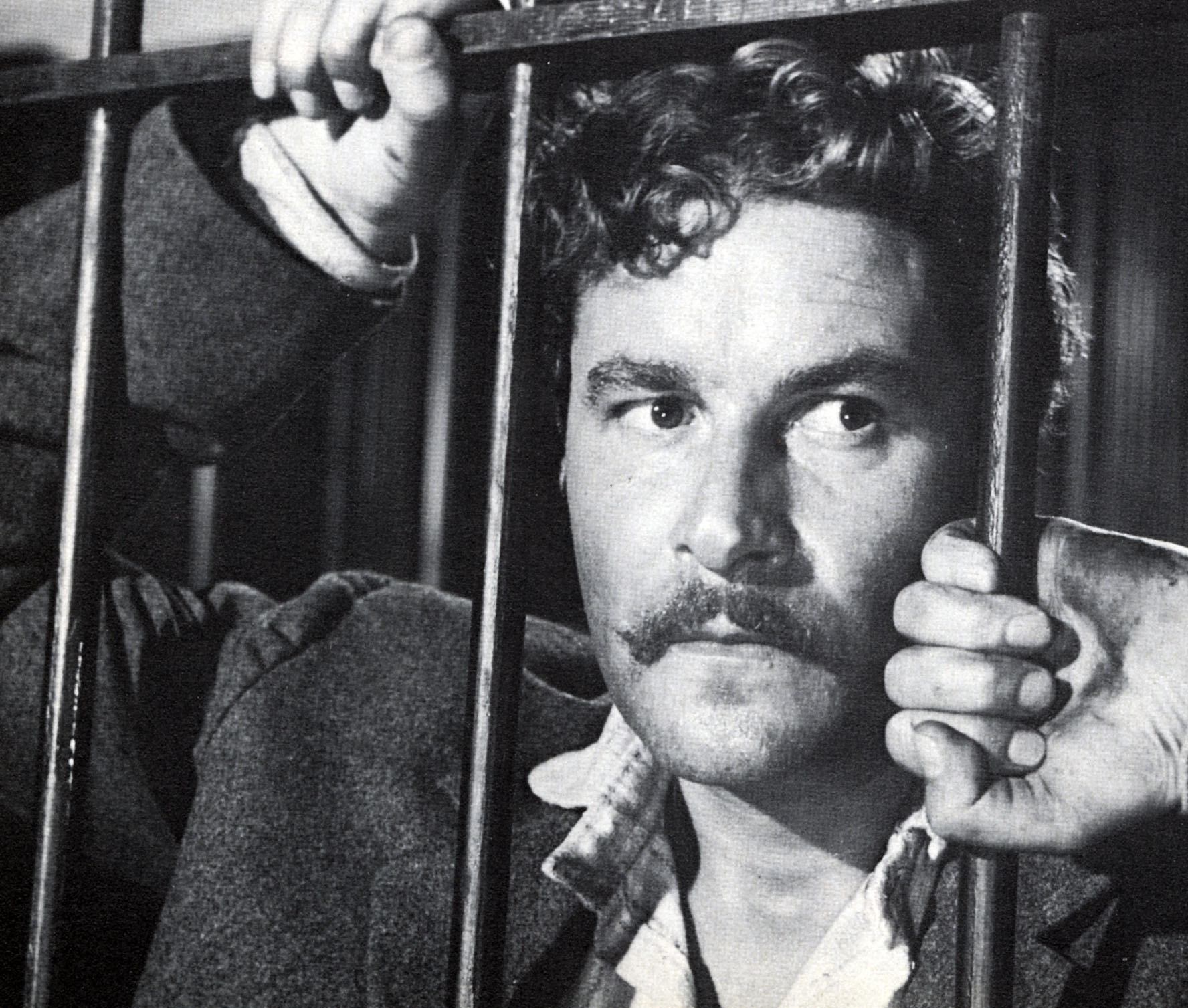
Nazzari in Il Brigante Musolino (1950)

Star of Italian cinema during the 1940s and 1950s. He made several melodramas with Raffaello Matarazzo, such as Catene in 1949. Nazzari played Alberto Lazzari in Federico Fellini's Nights of Cabiria. He died in 1979 in Rome.

== Awards ==
- David di Donatello Special David, for a life dedicated to cinema with passionate professionalism and extraordinary success.
- Venice Film Festival Best Actor in the Year of Count Volpi's Concession for Caravaggio, il pittore maledetto, 1941
- Nastro d'Argento Best Actor for Il bandito, 1947

== Selected filmography ==
- Cavalry (1936) as Umberto Solaro
- Ginevra degli Almieri (1936) as Antonio Rondinelli
- Tomb of the Angels (1937) as Pietro
- The Castiglioni Brothers (1937) as Fulvio Castiglioni
- The Count of Brechard (1938) as Francesco di Bréchard
- Luciano Serra, Pilot (1938) as Luciano Serra
- Fuochi d'artificio (1938) as Gerardo di Jersay
- The House of Shame (1938) as Giulio
- La grande luce (1939) as Rocco Moretti
- Unjustified Absence (1939) as Doctor Carlo Cristiani
- Cose dell'altro mondo (1939) as Jack Morison / Inspector General Garner
- The Night of Tricks (1939) as Capatosta
- È sbarcato un marinaio (1940) as Gianni / Hans
- One Hundred Thousand Dollars (1940) as Woods
- Beyond Love (1940) as Pietro Mirilli
- Then We'll Get a Divorce (1940) as Phil Gilder
- Big Shoes (1940) as Stefano Di Marco
- Yó soy mi rival (1940) as Pietro Lanfranchi
- L'uomo del romanzo (1940) as Pietro Lanfranchi
- Caravaggio (1941) as Michelangelo Merisi, the "Caravaggio"
- I mariti (1941) as Fabio Regoli
- Scampolo (1941) as Tito Sacchi
- Il cavaliere senza nome (1941) as Bernardino Visconti
- Villa da vendere (1941) as Franco Gádori
- The Last Dance (1941) as Professor Stefano Boronkay
- Sancta Maria (1942) as Paolo Wronski
- The Jester's Supper (1942) as Neri Chiaramontesi
- Bengasi (1942) as Filippo Colleoni
- Sleeping Beauty (1942) as Salvatore Il Nero della solfara "Sulfur black"
- Fedora (1942) as Loris Ipanov / Ivan Petrovic
- The Taming of the Shrew (1942) as Petruccio
- Story of a Poor Young Man (1942) as Massimo Doriot
- Happy Days (1942) as Michele
- Men of the Mountain (1943) as Lieutenant Andrea Fontana
- Harlem (1943) as Amedeo Rossi
- Apparition (1943) as Amedeo Nazzari
- Grazia (1963)
- La donna della montagna (1944) as Rodolfo Morigi
- The Ten Commandments (1945) (segment Non desiderare la donna d'altri—Thou shalt not covet thy neighbor's wife)
- Un giorno nella vita (1946) as Captain De Palma
- The Bandit (1946) as Ernesto
- Malacarne (1946) as Zù Bastiano
- Il cavaliere del sogno (1947) as Gaetano Donizetti
- When the Angels Sleep (1947) as Blin
- Fatalità (1947) as Renato Salesi
- The Captain's Daughter (1947) as Pugaciov, Tsar Piotr III
- Unexpected Conflict (1948) as Damian, the butler
- Legge di sangue (1948)
- Don Juan de Serrallonga (1949) as Don Juan de Serrallonga
- Romanticismo (1949) as Vitaliano Lamberti
- L'Invasore (1949) as Count Carlo di Valfreda
- The Wolf of the Sila (1949) as Rocco Barra
- Marmolada (1950)
- Torment (1950) as Carlo Guarnieri
- Chains (1950) as Guglielmo Aniello
- The Merry Widower (1950) as Professor De Carlo
- Alina (1950) as Giovanni
- Barrier to the North (1950) as Major Mauri
- Women and Brigands (1950) as Michele Pezza Fra Diavolo (Brother Devil)
- Il Brigante Musolino (1950) as Beppe Musolino (a character inspired by Italian brigand Giuseppe Musolino)
- Brief Rapture (1951) as Francesco Leverrier, Police Inspector
- Double Cross (1951) as Pietro Vanzetti
- Last Meeting (1951) as Piero Castelli
- Nobody's Children (1951) as Guido Canali
- Volver a la vida (1951)
- Amori e veleni (1952) as Franco Santinelli
- We Are All Murderers (1952) as Doctor Detouche (Italian version)
- Barefoot Savage (1952) as Riccardo Sartori
- The City Stands Trial (1952) as Prosecutor Antonio Spicacci
- The Bandit of Tacca Del Lupo (1952) as Capt. Giordani
- In Olden Days (1952) as Andrea Fabbri (segment La morsa)
- The Flame (1952) as Colonel Felt
- Who is Without Sin (1952) as Stefano Brunot
- The World Condemns Them (1953) as Paolo Martelli
- A Husband for Anna (1953) as Doctor Illuminato
- I Always Loved You (1953) as Massimo
- Pietà per chi cade (1954) as Carlo Savelli
- Torna! (1954) - Roberto Varesi
- Les Révoltés de Lomanach (1954) as Jacques Barnaud
- Appassionatamente (1954) as Andrea Morandi
- Proibito (1954) as Costantino Corraine
- The White Angel (1955) as Engineer Guido Carani
- L'ultimo amante (1955) as Cesare Monti
- The Intruder (1956) as Carlo Conti
- Nights of Cabiria (1957) as Alberto Lazzari
- La puerta abierta (1957) as Michel de Caroli
- Anna of Brooklyn (1958) as Ciccone
- The Sky Burns (1958) as Carlo Casati
- Melancholic Autumn (1958) as Andrea, merchant captain
- The Naked Maja (1958) as Prime Minister Manuel Godoy
- Policarpo (1959) as The Carabiniere (uncredited)
- World of Miracles (1959) as the presenter at the press conference
- Labyrinth (1959) as Professor De Lattre
- Carmen la de Ronda (1959) as Coronel
- Il raccomandato di ferro (1959) as the State Secretary
- Carthage in Flames (1959)
- La contessa azzurra (1960) as Salvatore Acierno
- Journey Beneath the Desert (1961) as Tamal
- Nefertiti, Queen of the Nile (1961) as Amenophis IV
- The Best of Enemies (1961) as Maj. Fornari
- The Corsican Brothers (1961) as Orlandi
- The Constant Wife (1962)
- Odio mortale (1962) as Ruiz / André Leboeuf
- La leggenda di Fra Diavolo (1962) as General Hugo
- Street of Temptation (1962) as Gentleman in a silk suit
- The Shortest Day (1963) as Squinting soldier with abacus
- Shivers in Summer (1964) as Count Marcello della Pietra
- Donde tú estés (1964) as Max Branzeri
- Il Gaucho (1964) as Marucchelli
- Le monachine (1965) as Livio Bertana
- Delitto d'amore (1966) as François Derroux
- The Poppy Is Also a Flower (1966) as Captain Di Nonno
- Spy Today, Die Tomorrow (1967) as Bardo Baretti
- The Column (1968) as Emperor Trajan
- The Sicilian Clan (1969) as Tony Nicosia
- The Valachi Papers (1972) as Gaetano Reina
- A Matter of Time (1976) as Tewfik
- Origins of the Mafia as Senator
- Derrick (season 3, episode 14: Der Mann aus Portofino; 1976) as Dr. Pinaldi
- Melodrammore (1977) as Himself

== Bibliography ==
- Amedeo Nazzari written by Piero Pruzzo and Enrico Lancia. Collana "Le stelle filanti", Gremese Editore, Roma, 1983.
- Amedeo Nazzari. Il divo, l'uomo, l'attore by Simone Casavecchia, with an interview to Evelina Nazzari, Centro Sperimentale di Cinematografia (Roma, 2007) in the 100 Anniversary of the birth of the actor (1907/2007). Sito ufficiale del C.S.C.
- Amedeo Buffa in arte Nazzari written by Maria Evelina Buffa. Collana "Cinema italiano", Edizioni Sabinae, Roma, 2008.
- Gundle, Stephen. Mussolini's Dream Factory: Film Stardom in Fascist Italy. Berghahn Books, 2013.
