= La colpa di una madre =

1952 film by Carlo Duse

- Directed by: Carlo Duse
- Written by: Carlo Duse; Vittorio Nino Novarese; Albino Principe
- Cinematography: Aldo Giordani
- Music by: Ezio Carabella
- Release date: 1952
- Country: Italy
- Language: Italiano

La colpa di una madre is a 1952 Italian melodrama film.

== Cast ==
- Marina Berti as Alma
- Folco Lulli as Enrico
- Mirella Uberti as Mara
- Marcella Rovena as Agata
- Ave Ninchi as Rosa
- Otello Toso as Mr. Herbert
- Erno Crisa as Alberto
- Lauro Gazzolo as The Fisherman
- Carlo Tusco as Enzo
