= Eldo Di Lazzaro =

Italian composer (1902-1968)

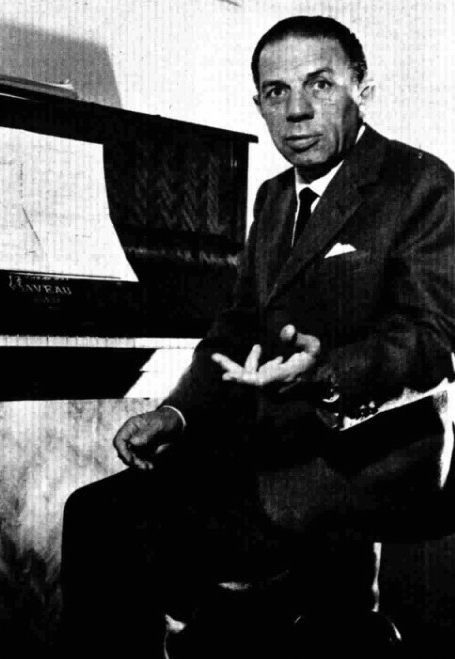
- Born: 21 February 1902; Trapani, Italy
- Died: 29 November 1968 (aged 66); Genoa, Italy

Eldo Di Lazzaro (21 February 1902 – 29 November 1968) was an Italian composer, mainly successful during the 1930s.

== Life and career ==
Born in Trapani, Di Lazzaro grew up in Trivento, in the Molise region. After having learned to play the piano from his father, he started his career as a pianist in ballrooms.

Di Lazzaro started composing songs and incidental music in the early 1920s, and had his breakout in 1932 thanks to the song "Campane". His style was known as "canzone alla Di Lazzaro" ('Di Lazzaro's style song'), and mixed the classical Italian style with folk influences. His best-known composition was "Reginella campagnola", which Glenn Miller successfully covered in English as "The Woodpecker Song" and later became a widely spread football chant. Other hits include "Chitarra romana", "La piccinina" (covered in French as "Toi que mon coeur appelle" and in English as "Ferryboat Serenade"), "Rosabella del Molise" and "Il passerotto", which was finalist at the third edition of the Sanremo Music Festival. A heart patient, he died on 29 November 1968, at the age of 66.
