= Safa Palatino Studios =

The Safa Palatino Studios are a complex of film and television studios in the Italian capital Rome. It is owned by Mediaset, who use it for the production of television programmes.

Historically, the site was used as a film studio from the 1930s to the 1970s. Although smaller than the better-known Cinecittà, a significant number of films were made there including Bicycle Thieves (1948). In 1983 the studios were bought by Silvio Berlusconi.

== Bibliography ==
- Gordon, Robert. Bicycle Thieves. British Film Institute, 2008.
- Kezich, Tullio. Federico Fellini: His Life and Work. I.B.Tauris, 2007.

== Bibliography ==
- Gordon, Robert. Bicycle Thieves. British Film Institute, 2008.
- Kezich, Tullio. Federico Fellini: His Life and Work. I.B.Tauris, 2007.
