= Minerva Film =

Italian film company

Minerva Film was an Italian film production and distribution company active between 1912 and 1956. It should not be confused with a similarly-named Danish production house.

Founded during the silent era, the company was named after the Roman goddess Minerva. Originally a distribution company, it handled major foreign productions for release in Italy.

It was one of the major companies of the later Fascist period along with Lux, Titanus and Scalera Film. It both distributed and made films through its subsidiary Excelsa Film.

In 1946 the company was involved in a legal dispute with David Selznick over the contract of star Alida Valli.

A major fire occurred in 1947 at the company's offices in Rome. Minerva continued operation as a distributor until it went into liquidation in 1956.

== Bibliography ==
- Gundle, Stephen. Fame Amid the Ruins: Italian Film Stardom in the Age of Neorealism. Berghahn Books, 2019.
- Boisen, Ingolf, Klip fra en filmmandsliv
- Striuli, Federico, Al fuoco! La tragedia della Minerva Film [Fire! The tragedy of the Minerva Film], "Immagine. Note di Storia del Cinema", no. 7, 2013 (in Italian)
