= Cialente =

Cialente is an Italian surname. Notable people with the surname include:

- Fausta Cialente (1898–1994), Italian writer and journalist
- Massimo Cialente (born 1952), Italian politician and doctor
- Renato Cialente (1897–1943), Italian actor
