= Cameriera bella presenza offresi... =

- Directed by: Giorgio Pastina
- Written by: Federico Fellini; Age & Scarpelli; Aldo De Benedetti; Ruggero Maccari; Nicola Manzari; Tullio Pinelli
- Starring: Elsa Merlini
- Cinematography: Domenico Scala
- Edited by: Eraldo Da Roma
- Music by: Alessandro Cicognini
- Release date: November 3, 1951 (Italy)
- Running time: 95 minutes
- Country: Italy
- Language: Italian

Cameriera bella presenza offresi... (English: Housemaid) is a 1951 Italian film directed by Giorgio Pastina. Federico Fellini was one of its scriptwriters. The film marked the comeback of Elsa Merlini after a nine years hiatus.

== Plot ==
Misadventures of the maid Maria through several employers. Maria, a beautiful but no longer very young waitress, waiting to steal her boyfriend Filiberto who has been postponing the wedding for fifteen years, during a torrid summer constantly changes employers through newspaper ads, finding herself involved in various misadventures.

She initially works with a lawyer, but is fired when the latter, having learned that he has been betrayed by his wife, accuses her of being complicit in her deception. Then hired by a famous prose actor, she manages to reconcile him with her wife, jealous of an actress whose husband has fallen in love.

On the day of August 15, she finds a job with a traveling salesman who is bedridden by an illness, but the apartment is turned upside down by several untimely visitors. She finally takes up service with a math teacher who practices yoga and dabbles in occultism.

During a séance, she learns that her fiancé's uncle has died. The wedding can thus finally be celebrated, despite the fact that before the ceremony it is known that the uncle's inheritance has belonged to the faithful guardian of the villa.

== Cast ==
- Elsa Merlini as Maria
- Gino Cervi as Filiberto Morrucchi
- Alberto Sordi as Donato
- Vittorio De Sica as Leonardo Leonardi
- Aldo Fabrizi as Giovanni Marchetti
- Peppino De Filippo as the lawyer
- Eduardo De Filippo as Raffaele
- Giulietta Masina as Ermelinda
- Delia Scala as the lawyer's wife
- Titina De Filippo as the lyric singer
- Isa Miranda as Angela Leonardi
- Milly Vitale as Nandina
- Armando Migliari as Leonardi's lawyer
- Aroldo Tieri as Luigino
- Cesare Fantoni as Bernanzoni
- Arturo Bragaglia as Matteo
- Bella Starace Sainati as Celestina
- Enrico Viarisio as Camillo
- Domenico Modugno as Enrico Marchetti
- Mariolina Bovo as Giovanni Marchetti's daughter
- Vittoria Crispo as Annetta
- Dina Sassoli as Carolina
- Carlo Ninchi as the priest
- Natale Cirino as the doctor
- Marcella Rovena as the Countess
