= The Queen of Navarre =

- Directed by: Carmine Gallone
- Written by: Eugène Scribe (play); Gherardo Gherardi; Sergio Amidei; Giacomo De Benedetti; Carmine Gallone
- Produced by: Raffaele Colamonici
- Starring: Elsa Merlini; Gino Cervi; Renato Cialente; Leonardo Cortese
- Cinematography: Arturo Gallea
- Edited by: Niccolò Lazzari
- Music by: Franco Casavola
- Production company: Juventus Film
- Distributed by: ENIC
- Release date: 30 March 1942
- Running time: 86 minutes
- Country: Italy
- Language: Italian

The Queen of Navarre (Italian: La regina di Navarra) is a 1942 Italian "white-telephones" historical film directed by Carmine Gallone and starring Elsa Merlini, Gino Cervi and Renato Cialente. It was made at the Cinecittà Studios in Rome, based on a play by Eugène Scribe. The film portrays a series of intrigues at the Madrid court of Charles V in the Sixteenth century.

== Cast ==
- Elsa Merlini as Margherita di Valois
- Gino Cervi as Carlo Vº
- Renato Cialente as Francesco Iº
- Leonardo Cortese as Enrico D'albret
- Clara Calamai as Isabella del Portogallo
- Paolo Stoppa as Il corriere Babieca
- Valentina Cortese as Eleonora d'Austria
- Nerio Bernardi as Il marchese di Gattinara
- Greta Gonda as Conchita Babieca
- Margherita Bagni as La duchessa di Ossuna
- Wanda Capodaglio as Una dama di corte
- Oreste Fares as Il sacerdote
- Enzo Musumeci Greco as Il maestro di scherma
- Adriano Vitale as Un messagero

== Bibliography ==
- Nowell-Smith, Geoffrey & Hay, James & Volpi, Gianni. The Companion to Italian Cinema. Cassell, 1996.
