= The Two Mothers =

1938 film

- Directed by: Amleto Palermi
- Written by: Giacomo De Benedetti; Ernesto Murolo; Amleto Palermi
- Produced by: Cariddi Oreste Barbieri
- Starring: Vittorio De Sica; María Denis; Renato Cialente
- Cinematography: Anchise Brizzi
- Edited by: Fernando Tropea
- Music by: Alessandro Cicognini
- Production company: Astra Film
- Distributed by: Variety Distribution
- Release date: 28 January 1939
- Running time: 87 minutes
- Country: Italy
- Language: Italian

The Two Mothers (Italian: Le due madri) is a 1938 Italian drama film directed by Amleto Palermi and starring Vittorio De Sica, María Denis and Renato Cialente. It was shot at the Cinecittà Studios in Rome. The film's sets were designed by Gastone Medin. It was released in the United States in 1940, and is sometimes dated by that year.

== Cast ==
- Vittorio De Sica as Salvatore
- María Denis as Agatina
- Renato Cialente as Michele
- Bella Starace Sainati as Mamma Rosa
- Lydia Johnson as L'altra madre, ex-cantante di varieta
- Armando Migliari as Il barbiere
- Dina Romano as Una contadina
- Nicola Maldacea
- Romolo Costa
- Clara Padoa
- Checco Rissone
- Amilcare Pettinelli
- Vittorio Bianchi
- Renato Chiantoni
- Luigi Erminio D'Olivo
- Alfredo Petroni
- Alba Ferrarotti
- Luisella Beghi
- Marisa Mosso
- Margherita Bossi
- Bianca Aurora
- Germana Vivian
- Francesco Gargano
- Gennaro Sabatano

== Bibliography ==
- Bert Cardullo. Screening the Stage: Studies in Cinedramatic Art. Peter Lang, 2006.
