= The Last Dance (1941 film) =

1941 film directed by Camillo Mastrocinque

- Directed by: Camillo Mastrocinque
- Written by: Ferenc Herczeg (play); Sergio Amidei; Giacomo De Benedetti
- Produced by: Raffaele Colamonici
- Starring: Elsa Merlini; Amedeo Nazzari; Renato Cialente
- Cinematography: Arturo Gallea
- Edited by: Gino Talamo
- Music by: Ezio Carabella; Franco Casavola
- Production company: Juventus Film
- Distributed by: ENIC
- Release date: 5 December 1941
- Running time: 90 minutes
- Country: Italy
- Language: Italian

The Last Dance (Italian: L'ultimo ballo) is a 1941 Italian "white-telephones" comedy film directed by Camillo Mastrocinque and starring Elsa Merlini, Amedeo Nazzari and Renato Cialente. It is considered to be in the tradition of White Telephone films, popular during the Fascist era. It is based on a play by the Hungarian writer Ferenc Herczeg and features Merlini in a dual role as mother and daughter.

It was shot at Cinecittà Studios in Rome. The film's sets were designed by the art director Alfredo Montori.

== Cast ==
- Elsa Merlini as La baronessa Titta Marcus & la baronessina Giuditta Marcus
- Amedeo Nazzari as Il professore Stefano Boronkay
- Renato Cialente as Andrea Marcus
- Paolo Stoppa as Felix
- Margherita Bagni as La vedova Jurika
- Nerio Bernardi as Il pittore Blanche
- Armando Migliari as Il capo cameriere Vittorio
- Carlo Minello as Marcello
- Luisa Garella as La Zelinger, l'amica pettegola
- Nando Tamberlani as Il rettore de l'Universita
- Enrico Luzi as Il fattorino curioso
- Sussy Dewy as La bionda nel notturno
- Vittoria Mongardi as La bruna accompagnata nel locale notturno
- Alessandra Foscari as Una ragazza nel locale notturno
- Giulia Martinelli as Una ragazza nel locale notturno

== Bibliography ==
- Moliterno, Gino. Historical Dictionary of Italian Cinema. Scarecrow Press, 2008.
- Piero Pruzzo & Enrico Lancia. Amedeo Nazzari. Gremese Editore, 1983.
