= Tropea (surname) =

Tropea is an Italian surname. Notable people with the surname include:

- Arcangelo Tropea (died 1719), Italian Religious
- Fernando Tropea (1905–1985), Italian film editor
- John Tropea (born 1946), American guitarist
- Marco Tropea (1942–2023), Italian publisher

== See also ==
- Tropea, a town in Italy and the origin of the surname
