= Departure (1938 film) =

1938 film

- Directed by: Amleto Palermi
- Written by: Amleto Palermi; Giacomo De Benedetti; Gherardo Gherardi
- Produced by: Ferruccio Biancini
- Starring: Vittorio De Sica; María Denis; Giovanni Barrella
- Edited by: Fernando Tropea
- Music by: Alessandro Cicognini
- Production company: Astra Film
- Distributed by: Generalcine
- Release date: 27 September 1938
- Running time: 91 minutes
- Country: Italy
- Language: Italian

Departure (Italian: Partire) is a 1938 Italian comedy film directed by Amleto Palermi and starring Vittorio De Sica, María Denis and Giovanni Barrella. It was shot at the Cinecittà Studios in Rome.

== Cast ==
- Vittorio De Sica as Paolo Veronda
- María Denis as Anna Diana
- Giovanni Barrella as Anteo Diana
- Cesare Zoppetti as Marsani
- Carlo Romano as Giulio
- Luigi Almirante as Baldassare - il nonno
- Clara Padoa as Miss Jane
- Clelia Matania as Lolò - la dattilografa
- Gianni Altieri as Giovanni Mattoni
- Nicola Maldacea as L'usciere di Anteo
- Elli Parvo as La contadina con il neonato
- Emilio Cigoli as L'impiegato dell'agenzia marittima
- Lilia Silvi as Una dattilografa
- Rio Nobile as Mattia - l'autista
- Checco Rissone as Il fattore
- Mimma Rubino Rossini
- Roberta Mari
- Giulio Alfieri
- Rosanna Schettina
- Marisa Vernati
- Gennaro Sabatano
- Olga Ceretti
- Lia Rosa
- Norma Nova
- Gemma Festa
- Romolo Costa
- Silvana Jachino as Mimì

== Bibliography ==
- Ruth Ben-Ghiat. Italian Fascism's Empire Cinema. Indiana University Press, 2015.
