= Friedrich Dammann =

German screenwriter and playwright (1901–1969)

- Born: 17 December 1901; Berlin, German Empire
- Died: 19 May 1969 (aged (67); Munich, Bavaria, West Germany
- Other name: F. D. Andam
- Occupation: Writer
- Years active: 1931–1965 (film)

Friedrich Dammann (1901–1969) was a German screenwriter and playwright.

== Filmography ==
- Mädchen in Uniform (1931) – Screenplay based on a play by Christa Winsloe
- Wrong Number, Miss (uncredited, credit for Herbert Rosenfeld, 1932), German-language version
  - The Telephone Operator (with Herbert Rosenfeld, 1932), Italian-language version
- How Shall I Tell My Husband? (with Herbert Rosenfeld, 1932)
- And Who Is Kissing Me? (with Herbert Rosenfeld, 1933), German-language version
  - The Girl with the Bruise (with Herbert Rosenfeld, 1933), Italian-language version
- Gypsy Blood (1934)
- Give Her a Ring (uncredited, 1934) – British remake of Wrong Number, Miss
- My Life for Maria Isabella (1935) – Screenplay based on the novel Die Standarte by Alexander Lernet-Holenia
- Artist Love (1935)
- The Mysterious Mister X (1936) – Screenplay based on the play Dicky by Paul Armont, Marcel Gerbidon and Jean Manoussi
- Premiere (1937)
- Talking About Jacqueline (1937) – Screenplay based on a novel by Katrin Holland
- Crooks in Tails (1937) – Screenplay based on an idea by Toni Huppertz
- Paradise for Two (uncredited, 1937) – British remake of And Who Is Kissing Me?
- Premiere (1938) – British remake of Premiere
- Gastspiel im Paradies (1938)
- Kiss Her! (uncredited, 1940) – Swedish remake of And Who Is Kissing Me?
- Aufruhr im Damenstift (1941) – Screenplay based on a play by Axel Breidahl
- Everything Will Be Better in the Morning (1948) – Screenplay based on a novel by Annemarie Selinko
- It Began at Midnight (1951)
- Girls in Uniform (uncredited, 1951) – Mexican remake of Mädchen in Uniform
- Happy Go Lovely (1951) – British remake of And Who Is Kissing Me?
- Heute nacht passiert's (1953)
- Ballerina (1956)
- Mädchen in Uniform (1958) – Remake of Mädchen in Uniform
- Pigen og vandpytten (uncredited, 1958) – Danish remake of And Who Is Kissing Me?
- Arzt ohne Gewissen (1959)
- Millionær for en aften (uncredited, 1960) – Norwegian remake of And Who Is Kissing Me?

Director

- Aufruhr im Damenstift (1941)

== Play ==
- Götterkinder (1948)

== Bibliography ==
- Ann C. Paietta. Teachers in the Movies: A Filmography of Depictions of Grade School, Preschool and Day Care Educators, 1890s to the Present. McFarland, 2007.
