= The Lady in White =

1938 film

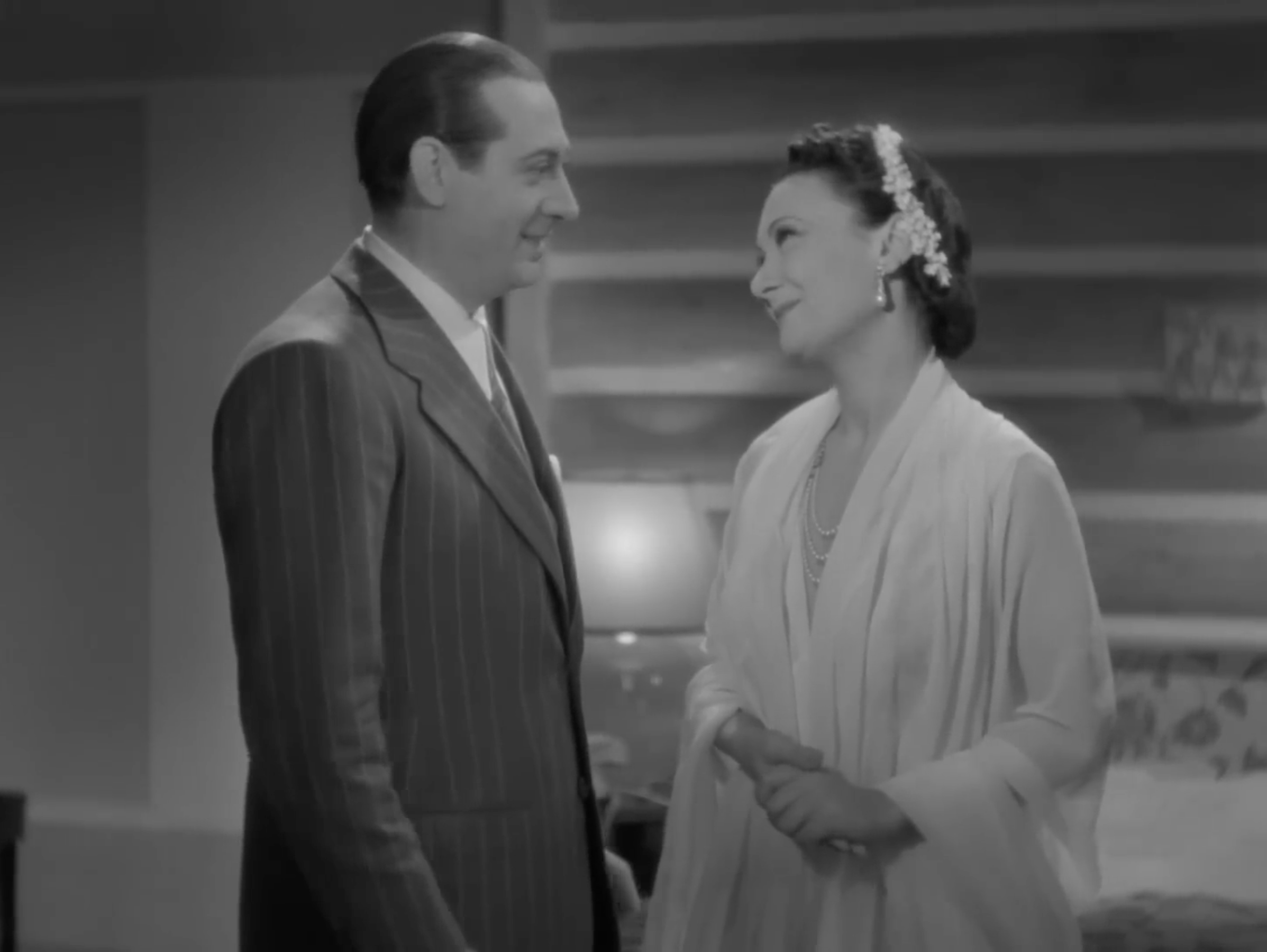
- Besozzi and Merlini in a film scene
- Directed by: Mario Mattoli
- Written by: Aldo De Benedetti; Guglielmo Zorzi
- Produced by: Angelo Besozzi
- Starring: Elsa Merlini; Nino Besozzi; Enrico Viarisio
- Cinematography: Arturo Gallea
- Edited by: Fernando Tropea
- Music by: Tito Petralia
- Production company: Aurora Film
- Distributed by: Industrie Cinematografiche Italiane
- Release date: 22 December 1938
- Running time: 80 minutes
- Country: Italy
- Language: Italian

The Lady in White (Italian: La dama bianca) is a 1938 Italian "white-telephones" comedy film directed by Mario Mattoli and starring Elsa Merlini, Nino Besozzi and Enrico Viarisio. The film's sets were designed by the art director Piero Filippone. It was shot at the Farnesina Studios of Titanus in Rome.

== Cast ==
- Elsa Merlini as Marina Gualandi
- Nino Besozzi as Giulio Gualandi
- Enrico Viarisio as Savelli
- Vincenzo Scarpetta as Virgilio Ottolano
- Arnaldo Martelli as Francesco
- Paolo Stoppa as Il direttore dell'hotel a Cervinia
- Ada Cristina Almirante as Isabella Schetti Marazzani
- Giuliana Gianni as Ginevra
- Ivana Claar as Corinna
- Aristide Baghetti as Il medico
- Fanny Marchio as La signora al vagone ristorante
- Giovanna Galletti as Un'amica di Ginevra
- Lisl Ander as Gianna
- Checco Rissone as L'autista del pullman a Cervinia
- Alba Ferrarotti as Gina
- Franca Volpini as Una cameriera

== Bibliography ==
- Clarke, David B. & Doel, Marcus A. Moving Pictures/Stopping Places: Hotels and Motels on Film. Lexington Books, 2009.
