= Renato Cialente =

Italian actor (1897–1943)

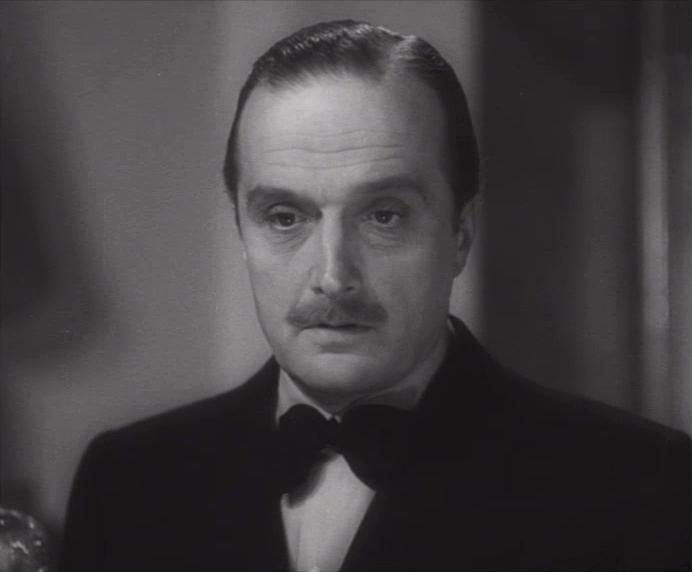
- Born: 2 February 1897; Treviglio, Kingdom of Italy
- Died: 25 November 1943 (aged 46); Rome, Kingdom of Italy
- Occupation: Actor
- Years active: 1920–1943

Renato Cialente (2 February 1897 – 25 November 1943) was an Italian stage and film actor. He appeared in 40 films between 1920 and 1943. His younger sister Fausta Cialente (1898–1994) was a novelist, journalist and political activist.

== Life and career ==
Born in Treviglio, Lombardy, Cialente began acting at his boarding school and made his professional debut with the stage company of Ermete Zacconi. After having known the Russian actress Tatyana Pavlova he was among the first Italian actors to adopt the Stanislavski's system, and in the 1920s he started being considered a highly regarded actor by renowned dramatists such as Luigi Pirandello and Pier Maria Rosso di San Secondo. In 1934 he formed a stage company with Elsa Merlini and gradually focused in the comedy genre.

Also active in cinema, Cialente tragically died in 1943 in Nazi occupied Rome, when upon leaving the theatre where he had performed Maxim Gorky's The Lower Depths he was accidentally struck by a German military vehicle.

== Selected filmography ==
- Beauty of the World (1927)
- The Girl with the Bruise (1933)
- Paprika (1933)
- The Lucky Diamond (1934)
- The Little Schoolmistress (1934)
- I Love You Only (1935)
- Adam's Tree (1936)
- Pietro Micca (1938)
- The Two Mothers (1938)
- Battles in the Shadow (1938)
- A Thousand Lire a Month (1939)
- The Dream of Butterfly (1939)
- The Knight of San Marco (1939)
- Piccolo mondo antico (1941)
- The Last Dance (1941)
- A Pistol Shot (1942)
- The Countess of Castiglione (1942)
- The Queen of Navarre (1942)
- A Little Wife (1943)
- Farewell Love! (1943)
- I'll Always Love You (1943)
- Maria Malibran (1943)
