= The Countess of Castiglione =

- Directed by: Flavio Calzavara
- Written by: Pino Accame; Mario Beltrami; Flavio Calzavara
- Produced by: Giovanni Addessi
- Starring: Doris Duranti; Andrea Checchi; Renato Cialente; Enzo Biliotti
- Cinematography: Carlo Montuori; Gábor Pogány
- Edited by: Ignazio Ferronetti
- Music by: Virgilio Doplicher
- Production company: Nazionalcine
- Distributed by: Manenti Film
- Release date: 14 October 1942
- Running time: 85 minutes
- Country: Italy
- Language: Italian

The Countess of Castiglione (Italian: La contessa Castiglione) is a 1942 Italian historical film directed by Flavio Calzavara and starring Doris Duranti, Andrea Checchi and Renato Cialente. The film portrays the life of the nineteenth-century Italian aristocrat Virginia Oldoini, Countess of Castiglione, best known as the lover of Napoleon III of France.

== Cast ==
- Doris Duranti as Virginia Oldoini, Countess of Castiglione
- Andrea Checchi as Baldo Princivalli
- Renato Cialente as Costantino Nigra
- Enzo Biliotti as Napoleon III
- Lamberto Picasso as marchese Oldoini
- Clara Auteri as Martina
- Annibale Betrone as l'urbanista barone Haussmann
- Giacomo Moschini as Mocquart
- Cesare Barbetti as il piccolo Peruzzi
- Marisa Dianora as Marianna
- Claudio Ermelli as il nobile sulla sedia a rotelle
- Nino Marchesini as Connot
- Alfredo Martinelli as un amico degli Oldoini
- Armando Migliari as un amico degli Oldoini
- Nico Pepe as un amico degli Oldoini
- Emilio Petacci as un amico degli Oldoini
- Vinicio Sofia as un amico degli Oldoini
- Maria Pia Spini as l'imperatrice Eugenia
- Gabriele Ferzetti
- Fulvio Ranieri
- Ennio Sammartino
- Ambretta Glori
- Edoardo Grandi
- Alda Lauri
- Alessandra Adari
- Luigi Allodoli

== See also ==
- The Contessa's Secret (1954)
