= Light in the Darkness =

1941 film

- Film poster
- Directed by: Mario Mattoli
- Written by: Mario Mattoli; Tilde Scalzi
- Produced by: Ettore Rosboch
- Starring: Fosco Giachetti; Alida Valli; Clara Calamai
- Cinematography: Arturo Gallea
- Edited by: Fernando Tropea
- Music by: Carlo Innocenzi
- Production company: Industria Cinematografica Italiana
- Distributed by: Industria Cinematografica Italiana
- Release date: 12 July 1941
- Running time: 83 minutes
- Country: Italy
- Language: Italian

Light in the Darkness (Italian: Luce nelle tenebre) is a 1941 Italian drama film directed by Mario Mattoli and starring Fosco Giachetti, Alida Valli and Clara Calamai. The film's sets were designed by the art director Ottavio Scotti. It was shot at the Palatino Studios in Rome.

== Cast ==
- Fosco Giachetti as Alberto Serrani
- Alida Valli as Marina Ferri
- Clara Calamai as Clara Ferri
- Enzo Biliotti as Il professore Ferri
- Carlo Campanini as Farelli
- Carlo Lombardi as Il maestro Sartori
- Guglielmo Sinaz as Un minatore
- Ciro Berardi as Un ospite della pensione 'Iride'
- Cesare Fantoni as Il direttore della profumeria
- Nino Marchetti as L'impresario musicale
- Emilio Petacci as Il portiere
- Ugo Sasso as Un infermiere
- Fernando Simbolotti as Il maggiordomo

== Bibliography ==
- Gundle, Stephen. Mussolini's Dream Factory: Film Stardom in Fascist Italy. Berghahn Books, 2013.
