= Adam's Tree =

1936 film by Mario Bonnard

- Directed by: Mario Bonnard
- Written by: Alfredo Testoni (play); Gherardo Gherardi; Corrado Alvaro; Aldo Vergano
- Produced by: Giulio Manenti
- Starring: Elsa Merlini; Antonio Gandusio; Renato Cialente
- Cinematography: Arturo Gallea
- Edited by: Fernando Tropea
- Music by: Umberto Mancini
- Production companies: Cines; Manenti Film
- Release date: 1936
- Running time: 76 minutes
- Country: Italy
- Language: Italian

Adam's Tree (Italian: L'albero di Adamo) is a 1936 Italian White Telephone comedy film directed by Mario Bonnard and starring Elsa Merlini, Antonio Gandusio and Renato Cialente. The film's sets were designed by the art director Guido Fiorini.

== Cast ==
- Elsa Merlini as Duchessa Graziella Santori
- Antonio Gandusio as L'ingegnere Lorenzo Baldi
- Renato Cialente as Dottore Alfonso Lombardi
- Dria Paola as Eugenia, sua moglie
- Olga Vittoria Gentilli as Angelica Pupini
- Margherita Bagni as Matilde Narchetti
- Olinto Cristina as Prospero Pupini
- Calisto Bertramo as Avvocato Giantini
- Marcello Giorda as Il duca Santori
- Luigi Mottura as Gaspare
- Nietta Zocchi as Infermiera Ersilia
- Nicola Maldacea as Matteo
- Claudio Ermelli as L'invitato affamato
- Mario Gallina as Il direttore del giornale 'La Sentinella')
- Dina Romano as La giornalaia
- Edda Soligo as Una invitata pettegola
- Giuseppe Pierozzi as Invitato al ballo
- Stefano Sibaldi as Invitato al ballo
- Lina Marengo as Invitata all ballo
- Alfredo Martinelli as Invitato al ballo
- Eugenio Fiorentini as Federico
- Rita Livesi as La cameriera di casa Pupini
- Mirella Scriatto as La cameriera di Matilde
- Rosina Adrario

== Bibliography ==
- Goble, Alan. The Complete Index to Literary Sources in Film. Walter de Gruyter, 1999.
