= And Who Is Kissing Me? =

1933 film

- Directed by: E. W. Emo
- Written by: Friedrich Dammann; Herbert Rosenfeld
- Produced by: Robert Leistenschneider
- Starring: Georg Alexander; Marion Taal; Felix Bressart
- Cinematography: Hugo von Kaweczynski
- Edited by: W. L. Bagier
- Music by: Franz Grothe
- Production company: Itala Film
- Release date: 7 March 1933
- Country: Germany
- Language: German

And Who Is Kissing Me? (German: ...und wer küßt mich?) is a 1933 German comedy film directed by E. W. Emo, starring Georg Alexander, Marion Taal, and Felix Bressart. It was shot at the Johannisthal Studios in Berlin. The film's sets were designed by the art director Max Heilbronner. A separate Italian-language version The Girl with the Bruise was also released the same year. The British film Paradise for Two (1937), Swedish film Kiss Her! (1940) and British film Happy Go Lovely (1951) are loose adaptations.

== Cast ==
- Georg Alexander as Bankier Morgan
- Marion Taal as Amelie
- Felix Bressart as Direktor Ritter
- Margo Lion as Der Star des Lustspielhauses
- Bruno Arno as Der Tanzmeister
- Trude Brionne as Inge
- Erich Dunskus
- Ingolf Kuntze
- Margarete Kupfer as Amelies Wirtin
- Kurt Lilien as Chauffeur Kremke
- Theo Lingen as Der Inspizient
- Alfred Martins
- Gertrud Wolle

== Bibliography ==
- Klaus, Ulrich J. Deutsche Tonfilme: Jahrgang 1933. Klaus-Archiv, 1988.
- Waldman, Harry (2008). Nazi Films in America, 1933–1942. Jefferson, NC: McFarland. ISBN 978-0-7864-3861-7.
