= The Contessa's Secret =

- Directed by: Georges Combret
- Produced by: Claude Boissol; Georges Combret; Leonardo Magagnini; Pierre Maudru
- Starring: Yvonne De Carlo; Georges Marchal
- Cinematography: Pierre Petit
- Music by: Paul Durand
- Distributed by: Taurus Film; Radius Productions
- Release date: 1954
- Countries: France; Italy
- Language: French

The Contessa's Secret (French: La Castiglione, Italian: La Contessa di Castiglione) is a 1954 French-Italian film starring Yvonne De Carlo as Virginia Oldoini, Countess of Castiglione.

== Cast ==
- Yvonne De Carlo as Virginia Oldoini
- Georges Marchal as Lucio Falengo
- Paul Meurisse as Napoleon III
- Rossano Brazzi as Count Cavour
- Lucienne Legrand as Empress Eugénie
- Lea Padovani as Princess Princess Mathilde Bonaparte
- Georges Lannes as Mocquart
- Michel Etcheverry as Pietri
- Tamara Lees as Princess of Metternich
- Claude Boissol as Nigra
- Lisette Lebon as Luisa
- Alberto Bonucci as Castiglione
- Roldano Lupi as Orsini
- Pierre Flourens as M. de Nieuwerkerke
- Charles Bouillaud as Un indicateur

== Production ==
De Carlo signed on for the film in late December 1953. The film would be the first starring a Hollywood actor to have been shot in French without an English version. It was originally called Castiglione and Raf Vallone and Georges Marchall were meant to co-star.

Filming had to be brought forward earlier than planned so De Carlo could make a film with Cornel Wilde.

The film was shot in France in March 1954. De Carlo did not enjoy working for the producers . "I was very much put out when they gave me a stand in for a French dialogue coach," she said. "I thought I deserved better than that, particularly as I studied day and night to perfect myself in the reading of the lines. That was only one of numerous irksome things which not only I but other people had to put up with in that French production."

She later claimed the film was the first time a Hollywood actress did the lead in a film for which there was no English language version. "It was a distinction that made me feel proud."

== See also ==
- The Countess of Castiglione (1942)
