= Buried Alive (1949 film) =

- Directed by: Guido Brignone
- Written by: Francesco Mastriani (novel); Gherardo Gherardi; Fulvio Palmieri
- Produced by: Leo Cevenini; Vittorio Martino
- Starring: Milly Vitale; Paul Muller; Evi Maltagliati
- Cinematography: Mario Albertelli
- Edited by: Giuseppe Fatigati
- Music by: Franco Casavola
- Production company: Flora Film
- Distributed by: Variety Distribution
- Release date: 23 February 1949
- Running time: 83 minutes
- Country: Italy
- Language: Italian

Buried Alive (Italian: La sepolta viva) is a 1949 Italian historical melodrama film directed by Guido Brignone and starring Milly Vitale, Paul Muller and Evi Maltagliati. It is based on the novel of the same title by Francesco Mastriani, set during the campaign for Italian unification.

It was shot at the Cinecittà Studios in Rome. The film's sets were designed by the art director Ivo Battelli.

== Cast ==
- Milly Vitale as Eva
- Paul Muller as Federico
- Evi Maltagliati as Elisa
- Tina Lattanzi as Elena
- Piero Palermini as Giorgio
- Carlo Tamberlani as Conte Capecci
- Enzo Fiermonte as Bruno
- Luigi Garrone as Silvestro
- Cesare Polacco as Ferdinando
- Eddie Rodd as himself
- Ben Rodd as himself

== Bibliography ==
- Bayman, Louis. The Operatic and the Everyday in Postwar Italian Film Melodrama. Edinburgh University Press, 2014.
