= Hugo von Kaweczynski =

German cinematographer

- Born: 12 October 1883; Hamburg, German Empire
- Occupation: Cinematographer
- Years active: 1928-1941 (film)

Hugo von Kaweczynski was a German cinematographer.

== Selected filmography ==
- Waterloo (1929)
- Peace of Mind (1931)
- Once There Was a Waltz (1932)
- Two Lucky Days (1932)
- Secret of the Blue Room (1932)
- The Hymn of Leuthen (1933)
- And Who Is Kissing Me? (1933)
- The Girl with the Bruise (1933)
- Model Wanted (1933)
- Three from the Unemployment Office (1933)
- The Page from the Dalmasse Hotel (1933)
- Marion, That's Not Nice (1933)
- Holiday From Myself (1934)
- Peter, Paul and Nanette (1935)
- The Red Rider (1935)
- The Saint and Her Fool (1935)
- Hilde and the Volkswagen (1936)
- Intermezzo (1936)
- Der Etappenhase (1937)
- Little County Court (1938)
- Twilight (1940)

== Bibliography ==
- Giesen, Rolf. Nazi Propaganda Films: A History and Filmography. McFarland, 2003.
