= Wealth Without a Future =

1939 film

- Directed by: Ferdinando Maria Poggioli
- Written by: Fabrizio Sarazani (play); Ermanno Contini; Ferdinando Maria Poggioli
- Produced by: Eugenio Fontana
- Starring: Lamberto Picasso; Paola Borboni; Doris Duranti; Claudio Gora
- Cinematography: Arturo Gallea
- Edited by: Giancarlo Cappelli; Ferdinando Maria Poggioli
- Music by: Ludovico Lunghi
- Production company: Alfa Cinematografica
- Distributed by: CINF
- Release date: 1939
- Running time: 82 minutes
- Country: Italy
- Language: Italian

Wealth Without a Future (Italian: Ricchezza senza domani) is a 1939 Italian drama film directed by Ferdinando Maria Poggioli and starring Lamberto Picasso, Paola Borboni and Doris Duranti. A wealthy industrialist retires to live in the countryside.

== Cast ==
- Lamberto Picasso as Massimo Barra
- Paola Borboni as Carolina Barra
- Doris Duranti as Laura, loro nipote
- Claudio Gora as Giovanni Di Cora
- Paolo Stoppa as Buby D'Alfia
- Guido Notari as Il segretario
- Alessandra Adari
- Luigi Cimara
- Vasco Creti
- Olinto Cristina
- Anita Farra
- Jole Ferrari
- Beatrice Mancini
- Armando Migliari
- Mirella Pardi
- Amilcare Quarra
- Maria Pia Spini

== Bibliography ==
- Moliterno, Gino. Historical Dictionary of Italian Cinema. Scarecrow Press, 2008.
