= Fury (1947 film) =

1947 film

- Directed by: Goffredo Alessandrini
- Written by: Vittorio Nino Novarese; Goffredo Alessandrini
- Based on: La Lupa; 1880 short story by Giovanni Verga
- Produced by: Fabio Franchini
- Starring: Isa Pola; Rossano Brazzi; Gino Cervi; Adriana Benetti
- Cinematography: Piero Portalupi
- Edited by: Giuseppe Fatigati; Fernando Tropea
- Music by: Franco Casavola
- Production company: A.G.I.C.
- Distributed by: A.G.I.C.
- Release date: 2 May 1947
- Running time: 94 minutes
- Country: Italy
- Language: Italian

Fury (Italian: Furia) is a 1947 Italian melodrama film directed by Goffredo Alessandrini and starring Isa Pola, Rossano Brazzi and Gino Cervi. The film was remade in 1957 as Wild Is the Wind, Anna Magnani's second Hollywood role. Loosely based on Giovanni Verga's short story La lupa, it is a melodrama set in the horsebreeding community.

== Cast ==
- Isa Pola as Clara
- Rossano Brazzi as Antonio
- Gino Cervi as Oreste
- Adriana Benetti as Marietta
- Checco Durante as Postman
- Paolo Ferrara as Doctor
- Camillo Pilotto as Priest
- Cesare Polacco as Lawyer
- Umberto Spadaro as Rocco
- Bella Starace Sainati as Priest's Sister
- Attilio Torelli
- Pina Piovani
- Armando Guarnieri

== Bibliography ==
- Dick, Bernard F. Hal Wallis: Producer to the Stars. University Press of Kentucky, 2004.
