= Bella Starace Sainati =

Italian stage and film actress

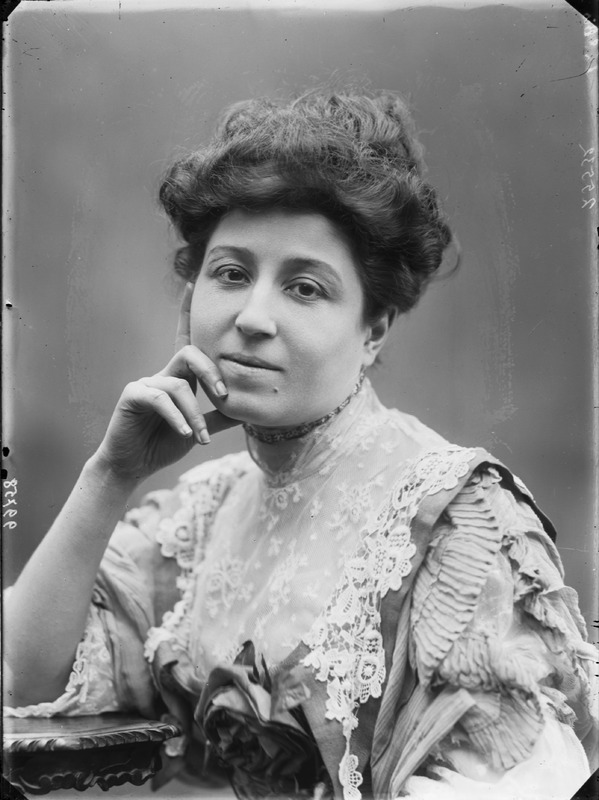
- Starace Sainati in 1932
- Born: June 2, 1878; Naples, Campania, Italy
- Died: August 4, 1958 (aged 80); Bologna, Emilia-Romagna, Italy
- Occupation: Actress
- Years active: 1911–1953

Bella Starace Sainati (June 2, 1878 – August 4, 1958) was an Italian stage and film actress.

== Selected filmography ==
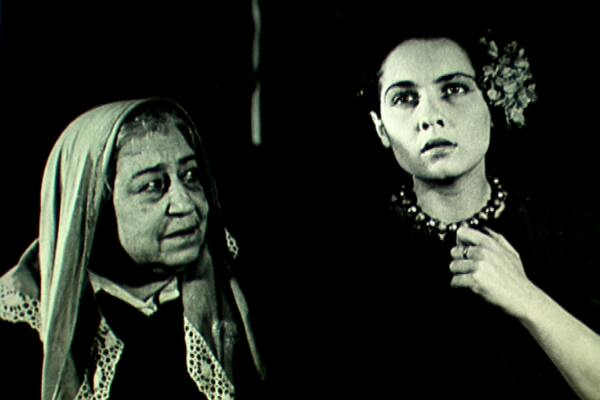
Bella Starace Sainati (left) and Edda Albertini in the play The House of Bernarda Alba (1947).

- The Two Mothers (1938)
- Naples Will Never Die (1939)
- Goodbye Youth (1940)
- Inspector Vargas (1940)
- Saint John, the Beheaded (1940)
- The Sinner (1940)
- First Love (1941)
- The Secret Lover (1941)
- Carmela (1942)
- Jealousy (1942)
- Signorinette (1942)
- Fourth Page (1942)
- Odessa in Flames (1942)
- Calafuria (1943)
- No Turning Back (1945)
- The Ten Commandments (1945)
- Farewell, My Beautiful Naples (1946)
- Bullet for Stefano (1947)
- Fury (1947)
- Vertigine d'amore (1949)
- The Vow (1950)
- His Last Twelve Hours (1951)
- Cameriera bella presenza offresi... (1951)
- The City Stands Trial (1952)
- What Price Innocence? (1952)
