= A Thousand Lire a Month =

1939 film directed by Max Neufeld

- Directed by: Max Neufeld
- Written by: Oreste Biancoli; Gherardo Gherardi; Luigi Zampa
- Based on: Screenplay Havi 200 fix (1936) by László Vadnay
- Produced by: Ettore Rosboch
- Starring: Alida Valli; Umberto Melnati; Osvaldo Valenti
- Cinematography: Ernst Mühlrad
- Edited by: Giorgio Simonelli
- Music by: Carlo Innocenzi
- Production company: Italcine
- Distributed by: Industrie Cinematografiche Italiane
- Release date: January 1939
- Running time: 83 minutes
- Country: Italy
- Language: Italian

A Thousand Lire a Month (Italian: Mille lire al mese) is a 1939 Italian "white-telephones" comedy film directed by Max Neufeld and starring Alida Valli, Umberto Melnati and Osvaldo Valenti. It is a remake of the 1936 Hungarian film Havi 200 fix. The plot concerns an electronic engineer who goes to Budapest, accompanied by his girlfriend, to work on experiments for a new television system leading to countless mix-ups.

It was shot at the Safa Palatino Studios in Rome. The film's sets were designed by the art director Ottavio Scotti.

== Cast ==
- Alida Valli as Magda
- Umberto Melnati as Matteo
- Osvaldo Valenti as Gabriele Corodi
- Renato Cialente as Il direttore generale della Radio di Budapest
- Ninì Gordini Cervi as Lilli
- Giuseppe Pierozzi as Axel, il capo del personale
- Anna Doré as Lia Loletta
- Amina Pirani Maggi as La madre di Magda
- Maria Polese as La zia di Magda
- Fausto Guerzoni as Leopoldo Almos
- Vasco Creti as Il padrone della farmacia
- Armando Arzalesi
- Aristide Baghetti as Il padrino con il monocolo
- Luigi Erminio D'Olivo as L'ingegnere in attesa di diventare padre
- Carlo Lombardi as Il ministro
- Renato Malavasi as Un tecnico televisivo
- Livia Minelli as Francesca, la cameriera
- Lina Tartara Minora as La padrona della pensione di Almos
- Sergio Pastorini as Il tenore
- Cesare Polacco as Carletto, l'altro padrino
- Adriano Rimoldi as Un impiegato della radio
- Dina Romano as La donna con il mal di denti
- Felice Romano as Un altro tecnico televisivo
- Gennaro Sabatano
- Elettra Terzolo as Caterina, la cameriera

== Bibliography ==
- Nowell-Smith, Geoffrey & Hay, James & Volpi, Gianni. The Companion to Italian Cinema. Cassell, 1996.
