= Virginia Oldoini, Countess of Castiglione =

Italian aristocrat, photographer (1837–1899)

Virginia Oldoini Rapallini
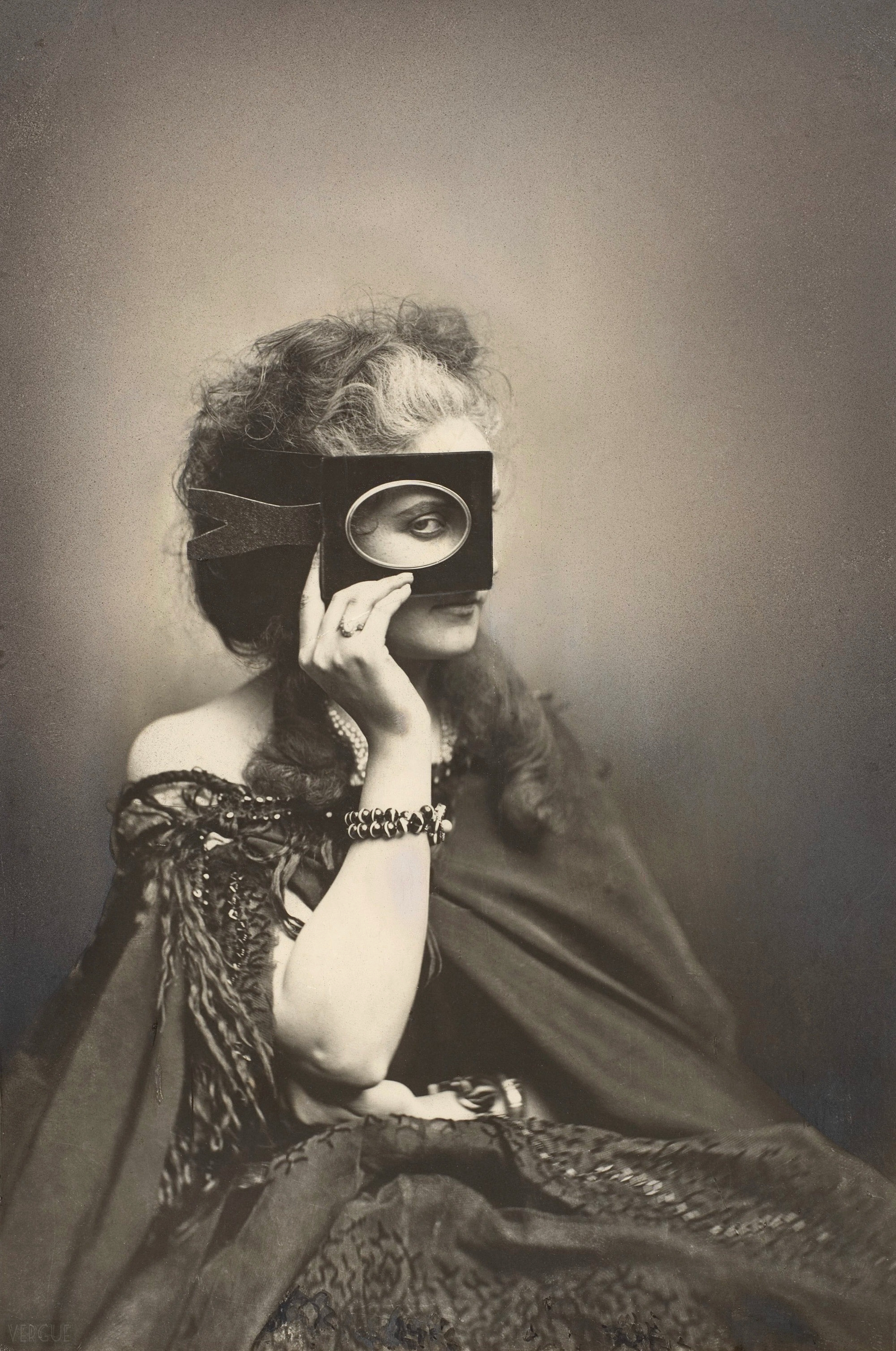
- The Countess of Castiglione c. 1863/66
- Born: Virginia Elisabetta Luisa Carlotta Antonietta Teresa Maria Oldoini Rapallini; 23 March 1837; Florence, Grand Duchy of Tuscany
- Died: 28 November 1899 (aged 62); Paris, French Third Republic
- Burial place: Père Lachaise Cemetery; 48.860°N 2.396°E
- Known for: Photographic artist and supposed secret agent
- Title: Countess of Castiglione
- Spouse: Francesco Verasis di Castiglione (m. 1854; sep. 1855)
- Children: 1

Virginia Oldoini Rapallini, Countess of Castiglione (23 March 1837 – 28 November 1899), better known as La Castiglione, was an Italian aristocrat who achieved notoriety as a mistress of Emperor Napoleon III of France. She was also a significant figure in the early history of photography.

== Early life ==
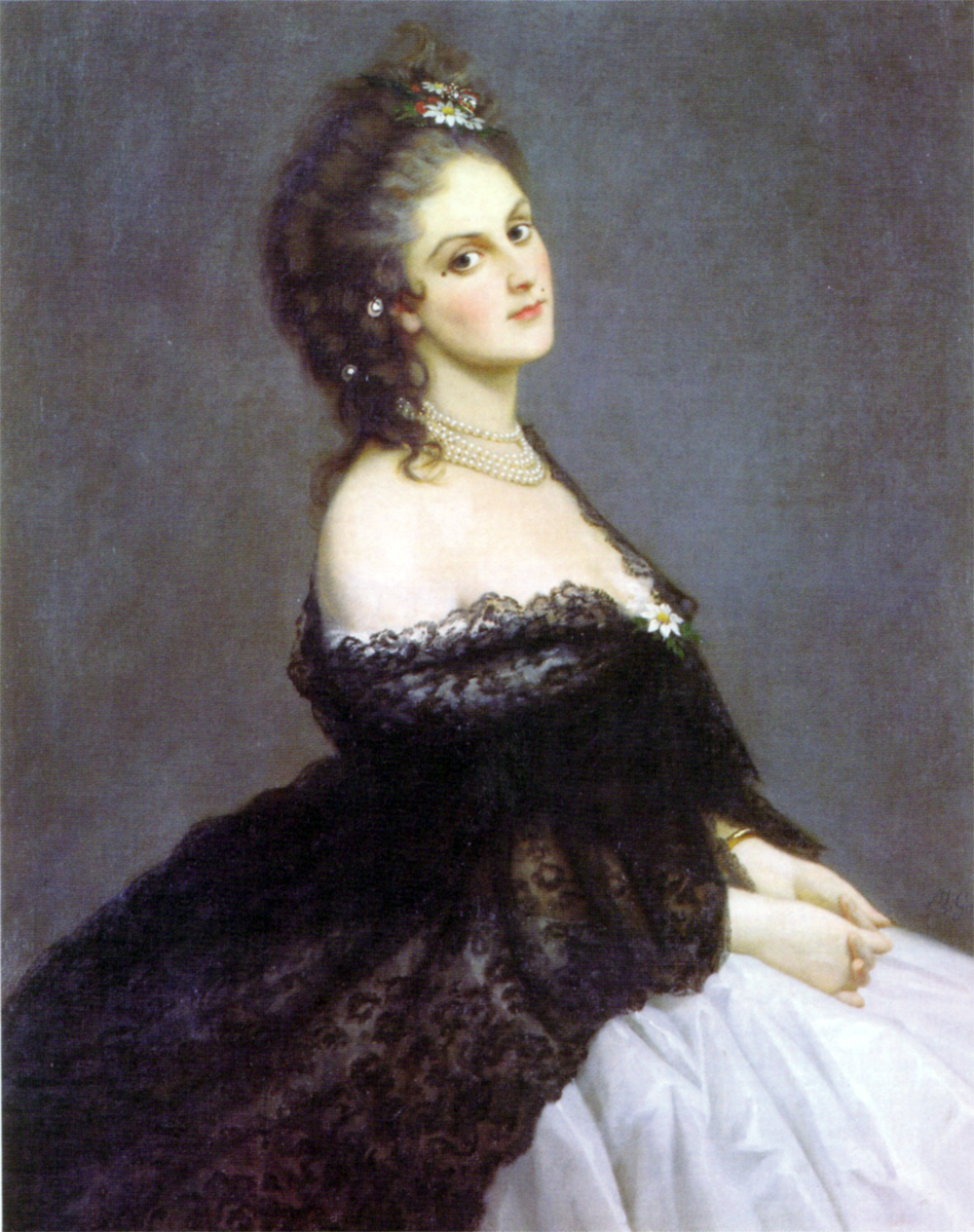
Portrait of the Countess di Castiglione painted in Paris in 1862 by Michele Gordigiani

Virginia Elisabetta Luisa Carlotta Antonietta Teresa Maria Oldoini Rapallini was born on 22 March 1837 in Florence, Tuscany to Marquis Filippo Oldoini Rapallini and Isabella Lamporecchi, members of the minor Tuscan nobility; she was often known by her nickname of "Nicchia". Ignored by her father, she was educated by her grandfather Ranieri Lamporecchi. She married Francesco Verasis, Count of Castiglione, at the age of 17. He was twelve years her senior. They had a son, Giorgio.

Her cousin, Camillo, Count of Cavour, was the prime minister of Victor Emmanuel II, King of Sardinia (that included also Piedmont, Val d'Aosta, Liguria, Nice and Savoy), and later of reunited Italy. When the Count and Countess traveled to Paris in 1855, the Countess was under her cousin's instructions to plead the cause of Italian unity with Napoleon III of France. She achieved notoriety by becoming Napoleon III's mistress, a scandal that led her husband to demand marital separation. In 1855, she had a brief affair with King Victor Emmanuel II of Italy, who nicknamed her "Nini".

In 1856–1857, she entered the social circle of European royalty. During her relationship with the French emperor, she met Augusta of Saxe-Weimar, Otto von Bismarck and Adolphe Thiers. She had many lovers, including a banker of the Rothschild family and the then director of the Louvre Museum.

The Countess was known for her beauty and her flamboyant entrances in elaborate dress at the imperial court. One of her most infamous outfits was a "Queen of Hearts" costume. George Frederic Watts painted her portrait in 1857. She was described as having long, wavy blonde hair, a fair complexion, a delicate oval face, and eyes that constantly changed colour from green to an extraordinary blue-violet.

== Italian unification ==
The Countess returned to Italy in 1857 when her affair with Napoleon III was over. Four years later, the Kingdom of Italy was proclaimed, conceivably in part due to the influence that the Countess had exerted on Napoleon III. That same year, she returned to France and settled in Passy.

In 1871, just after the defeat of France in the Franco-Prussian War, she was called to a secret meeting with Otto von Bismarck to explain to him how the German occupation of Paris could be fatal to his interests. She may have been persuasive because Paris was spared Prussian occupation.

== Photographic artist ==
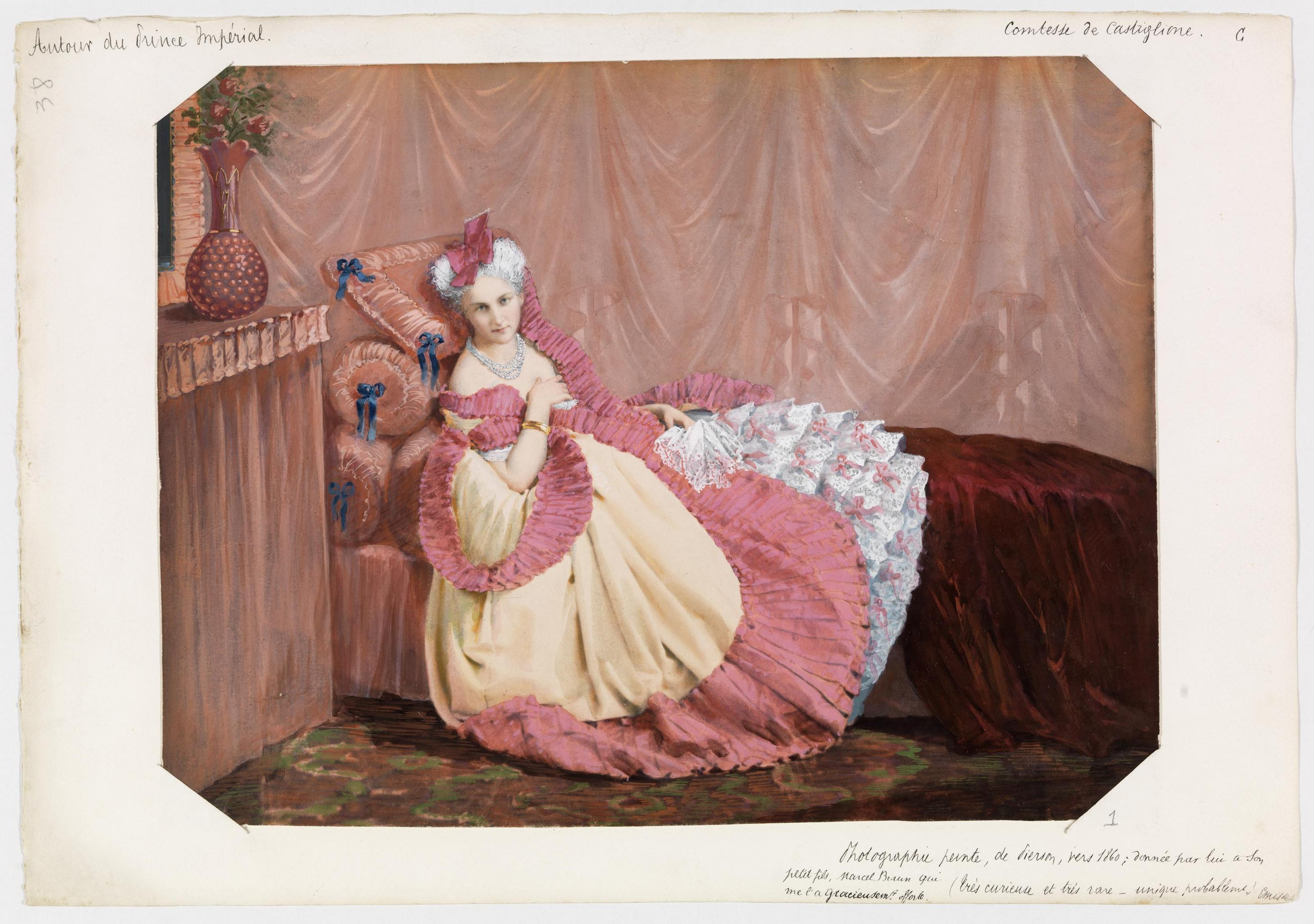
Circa 1860

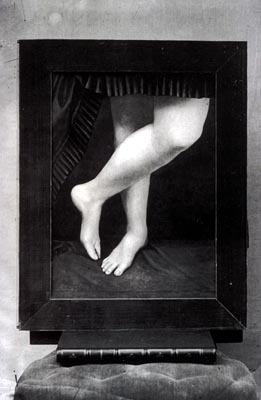
Circa 1861–1867

Photographs by Pierson

In 1856 she began sitting for Mayer and Pierson, photographers favored by the imperial court. Over the next four decades she directed Pierre-Louis Pierson to help her create 700 different photographs in which she re-created the signature moments of her life for the camera. She spent a large part of her personal fortune and even went into debt to execute this project. Most of the photographs depict the Countess in theatrical outfits, such as the Queen of Hearts dress. A number of photographs depict her in poses that were risqué for the era – notably, images that expose her bare legs and feet. In these photos, her head is cropped out.

Robert de Montesquiou, a Symbolist poet, dandy, and avid art collector, was fascinated by the Countess di Castiglione. He spent thirteen years writing a biography, La Divine Comtesse, which appeared in 1913. After her death, he collected 433 of her photographs, all of which entered the collection of the Metropolitan Museum of Art.

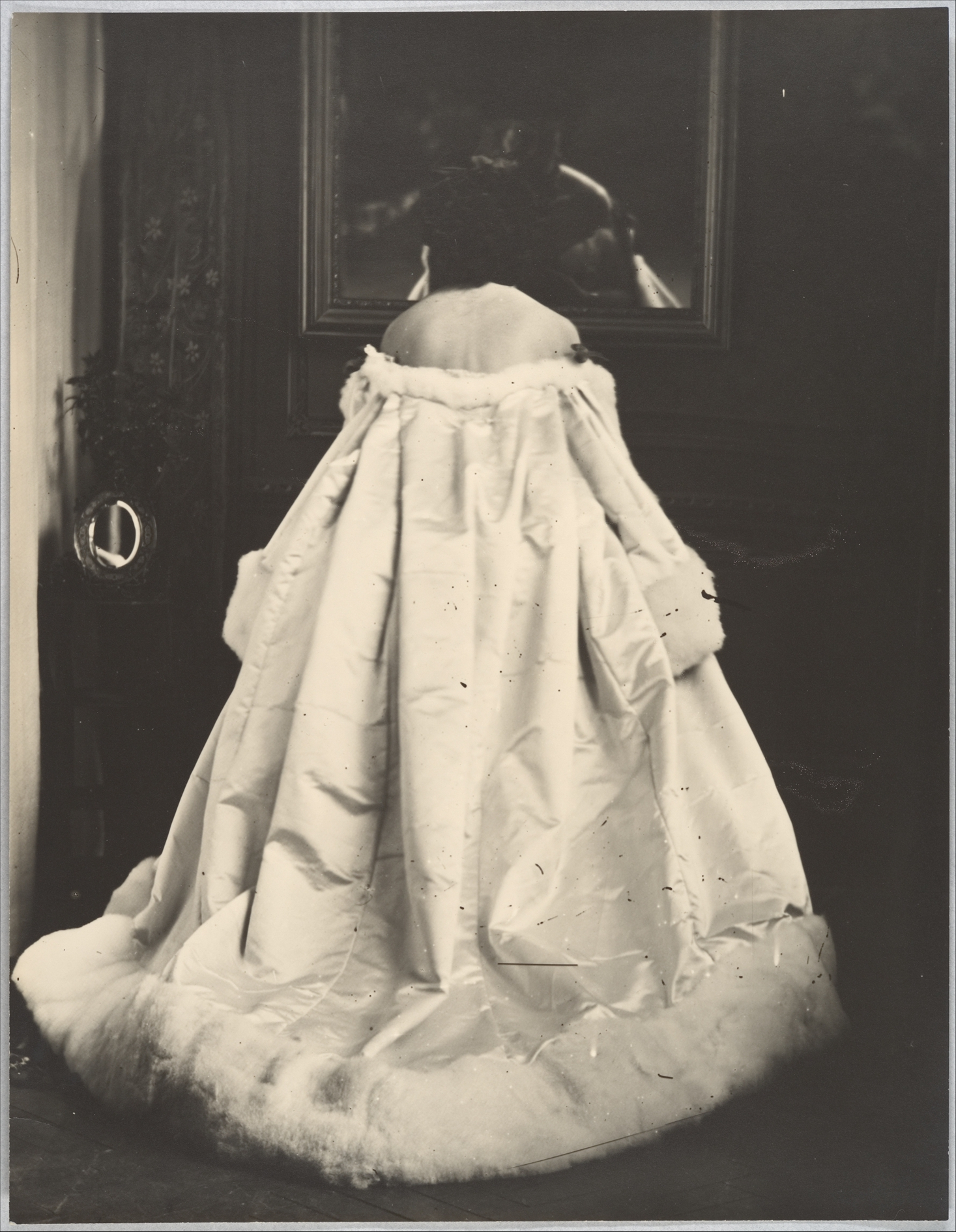
"The Opera Ball", Pierre-Louis Pierson, 1861-1867, Gelatin silver print from glass negative, Metropolitan Museum of Art.

== Later years ==
Virginia spent her declining years in an apartment in the Place Vendôme, where she had the rooms decorated in funeral black, the blinds kept drawn, and mirrors banished—apparently so she would not have to confront her advancing age and loss of beauty. She would leave the apartment only at night. In the 1890s she began a brief collaboration with Pierson again, though her later photographs clearly show her loss of any critical judgement, possibly due to her growing mental instability. She wished to set up an exhibit of her photographs at the Exposition Universelle (1900), though this did not happen. She died on 28 November 1899, at the age of sixty-two, and was buried at the Père Lachaise Cemetery in Paris.

== Legacy ==
Gabriele D'Annunzio authored an appreciation of the Countess that appeared as a preface to Montesquiou's work. It was also published on its own in 1973.

The Countess's life was depicted in a 1942 Italian film, The Countess of Castiglione, and a 1954 Italian-French film, The Contessa's Secret, that starred Yvonne De Carlo.

The Countess was painted by the artist Jacques-Émile Blanche after her death.

The Countess is also depicted in Alexander Chee's novel The Queen of the Night.

She inspired the novel Exposition by Nathalie Léger.

== Sources ==
- Hamish Bowles, "Vain Glory" in Vogue (Aug 2000), 242–245, 270-271
- Alain Decaux, La Castiglione, d’après sa correspondence et son journal inédits (Librairie académique Perrin, 1953)
- Claude Dufresne La comtesse de Castiglione (Broché, 2002)
- Massimo Grillandi, La contessa di Castiglione (Milan: Rusconi, 1978)
- Max Henry, "Gotham Dispatch", review of an exhibit at the Metropolitan Museum of Art September 19, 2000 – December 31, 2000, accessed 30 March 2005
- Heather McPherson, "La Divine Comtesse: (Re)presenting the Anatomy of a Countess," in The Modern Portrait in Nineteenth Century France (Cambridge and New York: Cambridge University Press, 2001), 38-75
- (in French)Isaure de Saint-Pierre, La Dame de Coeur, un amour de Napoléon III] (Albin Michel, 2006), ISBN 2-226-17363-3
- Abigail Solomon-Godeau, "The Legs of the Countess," in October 39 (Winter 1986): 65-108. Reprinted in Emily Apter and William Pletz, eds., Fetishism as Cultural Discourse (Ithaca and London: Cornell University Press, 1993), 266-306
- Roger L. Williams, Gaslight and Shadow: The World of Napoleon III (NY: Macmillan, 1957), Ch. 6: "The Countess of Castiglione"
- aboutthearts.com: "Indepth Art News", notice of an exhibit at the Musée d'Orsay October 12, 1999 – January 23, 2000, accessed 30 March 2005
- "La Divine Comtesse": Photographs of the Countess de Castiglione, catalog for a 2000 exhibition of the Countess de Castiglione photos at the Metropolitan Museum of Art, ISBN 0-300-08509-5
