= Naples Will Never Die =

- Marie Glory and Fosco Giachetti
- Directed by: Amleto Palermi
- Written by: Jean-Georges Auriol; Ernesto Murolo; Cesare Giulio Viola; Amleto Palermi
- Produced by: Giulio Manenti
- Starring: Fosco Giachetti; Marie Glory; Paola Barbara; Cesare Bettarini
- Cinematography: Anchise Brizzi
- Edited by: Fernando Tropea
- Music by: Alessandro Cicognini
- Production company: Manenti Film
- Distributed by: Manenti Film
- Release date: 18 February 1939
- Running time: 88 minutes
- Country: Italy
- Language: Italian

Naples Will Never Die (Italian: Napoli che non muore) is a 1939 Italian comedy film directed by Amleto Palermi and starring Fosco Giachetti, Marie Glory and Paola Barbara. A young French tourist on holiday in Naples meets and falls in love with an engineer. She marries him, but finds his family overbearing and traditional while they consider her to be too extrovert. She leaves him and returns to France, but the couple are eventually reunited.

== Cast ==
- Fosco Giachetti as Mario Fusco
- Marie Glory as Annie Fusco
- Paola Barbara as Teresa
- Bella Starace Sainati as Donna Amalia Fusco
- Cesare Bettarini as Pietro
- Carla Sveva as Lia
- Ennio Cerlesi as Enrico
- Armando Migliari as Daspuro
- Clelia Matania as Rosinella
- Giuseppe Porelli as Il maestro Califano
- Gianni Agus as Bebè
- Vittorio Parisi as Il cantate

== Bibliography ==
- Gundle, Stephen. Mussolini's Dream Factory: Film Stardom in Fascist Italy. Berghahn Books, 2013.
- Liehm, Mira. Passion and Defiance: Film in Italy from 1942 to the Present. University of California Press, 1984.
