= Happy Go Lovely =

1951 film by H. Bruce Humberstone

- Movie poster
- Directed by: H. Bruce Humberstone
- Written by: Friedrich Dammann (story); Herbert Rosenfeld (story); Val Guest
- Produced by: Marcel Hellman
- Starring: David Niven; Vera-Ellen; Cesar Romero
- Cinematography: Erwin Hillier
- Edited by: Bert Bates
- Music by: Mischa Spoliansky
- Production company: Marcel Hellman Productions (as Excelsior Films Ltd.)
- Distributed by: Associated British-Pathé (UK); RKO Radio Pictures (US)
- Release dates: 7 June 1951 (Premiere-London); 8 July 1951 (US)
- Running time: 97 minutes
- Country: United Kingdom
- Language: English
- Budget: $1 million
- Box office: £230,845 (UK)

Happy Go Lovely is a 1951 British musical comedy film in Technicolor, directed by H. Bruce Humberstone and starring Vera-Ellen, David Niven, and Cesar Romero. The film was made and first released in the UK, and distributed in the US by RKO Radio Pictures in 1952.

== Plot ==
When chorus girl Janet Jones is late for rehearsal in Edinburgh, Bates, the chauffeur for B. G. Bruno, gives her a ride in Bruno's limousine, starting rumours that she is engaged to the wealthiest man in Scotland. American producer John Frost, her employer, has just had the star of his next show, Frolics to You, walk out on him because of his desperate financial situation. He replaces her with Janet, hoping that Bruno will back his revue, or at least that he can use Bruno's reputation to fend off impatient creditors. Her dressmaker, Madame Amanda, gives her more clothes, and sends the bill to Bruno. Janet's roommate, Mae Thompson, convinces her to continue the deception.

When Bruno receives the bill, he goes to the theatre to investigate. Janet mistakes him for reporter Paul Tracy, who was supposed to interview her. Finding Janet very attractive, Bruno does not correct her error. The two fall in love. Bruno amuses himself by continually asking Janet about her relationship with the millionaire.

Finally, Bruno gives Frost a cheque for £10,000. When Janet finds out, however, she confesses everything. On the opening night of Frolics to You, Bruno takes a box seat. Frost summons the police to have Bruno arrested as an imposter. In between performing on stage, Janet tries to make "Paul Tracy" hide or leave. During the hectic proceedings, Janet blurts out that she loves him. The police catch Bruno, but the inspector in charge recognizes him, much to the surprise of Janet and Frost, and all ends well.

== Cast ==
- David Niven as B.G. Bruno
- Vera-Ellen as Janet Jones
- Eve Boswell as Janet's Singing Voice
- Cesar Romero as John Frost
- Bobby Howes as Charlie, Frost's Assistant
- Diane Hart as Mae Thompson
- Gordon Jackson as Paul Tracy
- Barbara Couper as Madame Amanda
- Henry Hewitt as Dodds, Bruno's Assistant
- Gladys Henson as Mrs. Urquhart, Janet and Mae's Landlady
- Hugh Dempster as Bates
- Sandra Dorne as Betty
- Joyce Carey as Bruno's Secretary
- John Laurie as Jonskill, One of The Creditors
- Wylie Watson as Stage Door Keeper
- Joan Heal as Phyllis Gardiner, The Former Star
- Hector Ross as Harold
- Ambrosine Phillpotts as Lady Martin
- Molly Urquhart as Madame Amanda's Assistant

== Production ==
The film was financed by Peter Rathvorn, Associated British and the National Film Finance Corporation. Filming started May 1950 and mostly took place at Associated British's Elstree Studios. Rober Lennard was originally announced as director.

== Reception ==
The film was a hit at the British box office, being judged by Kinematograph Weekly as a "notable performer" at British cinemas in 1951.

== Musical numbers ==
1. "MacIntosh's Wedding" - Sung by Joan Heal, danced by Vera-Ellen and Chorus.
2. "One-Two-Three" - Sung and danced by Vera-Ellen (dubbed by Eve Boswell) and Chorus.
3. "London Town" - Danced by Vera-Ellen and Chorus.
4. "Would You - Could You?"' - Sung and danced by Vera-Ellen (dubbed by Eve Boswell)

== See also ==
- And Who Is Kissing Me? (1933)
- Paradise for Two (1937)
- List of films in the public domain in the United States
