= Fire Over the Sea =

1947 Italian film by Michał Waszyński and Vittorio Cottafavi

- Directed by: Michał Waszyński; Vittorio Cottafavi
- Written by: Filippo Comoletti Gaudenti; Vittorio Cottafavi; Gherardo Gherardi; Giulio Morelli; Alberto Pozzett; Michal Waszynski
- Starring: Carlo Ninchi; Evi Maltagliati; Silvana Jachino
- Cinematography: Arturo Gallea
- Edited by: Enrico Linke
- Music by: Alessandro Cicognini; Giuliano Conte
- Production company: Sirena Film
- Distributed by: Variety Distribution
- Release date: 28 April 1948
- Running time: 71 minutes
- Country: Italy
- Language: Italian

Fire Over the Sea (Italian: Fiamme sul mare) is a 1947 Italian drama film directed by Michał Waszyński and Vittorio Cottafavi and starring Carlo Ninchi Evi Maltagliati and Silvana Jachino. It was shot at the Farnesina Studios of Titanus in Rome. The film's were designed by the art director Gastone Medin. It earned 45 million lira at the box office.

== Synopsis ==
A partly submerged cargo ship is raised from the harbour in Naples by a collective of sailors, and made seaworthy again. It embarks on its first voyage to Buenos Aires. A wealthy businessman Matteo La Spina offers to buy the boat from them, revealing to his daughter Diana that he actually plans to set it alight during the return passage to Naples and claim the insurance money. She returns to the ship to try and save it, but accidentally triggers the inflammable materials in the hold. Although the fire is put out, she dies in the process.

== Cast ==
- Carlo Ninchi as Stefano
- Evi Maltagliati as Dory Jane
- Silvana Jachino as Diana La Spina
- Edda Albertini as Alda
- Felice Romano as Gaspare Marani
- Giacomo Rondinella as Giovanni Proietti
- Giuseppe Varni as Matteo La Spina
- Leopoldo Valentini as Pietro Ferri
- Nando Del Luca as Paolo Santi
- Piero Palermini as Rio Marani
- Alfred Rizzo as Barbiere in Argentina

== Bibliography ==
- Anile, Alberto. Orson Welles in Italy. Indiana University Press, 2013.
- Chiti, Roberto & Poppi, Roberto. Dizionario del cinema italiano: Dal 1945 al 1959. Gremese Editore, 1991.
