= Arturo Gallea =

Italian cinematographer and producer (1895–1959)

- Born: 3 August 1885; Turin, Kingdom of Italy
- Died: 21 September 1959 (aged 64); Rome, Italy

Arturo Gallea (18 September 1895 – 21 September 1959) was an Italian cinematographer and producer.

Born in Turin, Gallea entered the industry of cinema in 1911 as a film producer. He began his career as a cinematographer in the mid-1910s and, in 1952, won the Nastro d'Argento for best cinematography for his work in Renato Castellani's Two Cents Worth of Hope. Gallea died in a car accident in 1959.

== Selected filmography ==
- La crociata degli innocenti (1916)
- The Cry of the Eagle (1923)
- Nini Falpala (1933)
- Everybody's Secretary (1933)
- The Matchmaker (1934)
- Creatures of the Night (1934)
- The Blind Woman of Sorrento (1934)
- Don Bosco (1935)
- The Man Who Smiles (1936)
- God's Will Be Done (1936)
- Adam's Tree (1936)
- Lohengrin (1936)
- Music in the Square (1936)
- The Two Sergeants (1936)
- Triumph of Love (1938)
- The Lady in White (1938)
- Marionette (1938)
- Under the Southern Cross (1938)
- Defendant, Stand Up! (1939)
- The Document (1939)
- At Your Orders, Madame (1939)
- We Were Seven Sisters (1939)
- Wealth Without a Future (1939)
- It Always Ends That Way (1939)
- A Romantic Adventure (1940)
- Piccolo mondo antico (1941)
- The Last Dance (1941)
- The Man on the Street (1941)
- Light in the Darkness (1941)
- The Queen of Navarre (1942)
- Disturbance (1942)
- Jealousy (1942)
- Love Story (1942)
- I'll Always Love You (1943)
- The Materassi Sisters (1944)
- The Priest's Hat (1944)
- Lo sbaglio di essere vivo (1945)
- Il mondo vuole così (1946)
- The Unknown Man of San Marino (1946)
- Fire Over the Sea (1947)
- The Lady of the Camellias (1947)
- William Tell (1949)
- The Legend of Faust (1949)
- Mistress of the Mountains (1950)
- Volcano (1950)
- Captain Demonio (1950)
- Two Cents Worth of Hope (1952)
- The White Sheik (1952)
- Son of the Hunchback (1952)
- Bread, Love and Dreams (1953)
- The Merchant of Venice (1953)
- Bread, Love and Jealousy (1954)
- The King's Prisoner (1954)
- Orphan of the Ghetto (1954)
- The Widow (1955)
- I pappagalli (1955)
- The Belle of Rome (1955)
- The Angel of the Alps (1957)
- Valeria ragazza poco seria (1958)
