= A Garibaldian in the Convent =

1942 film

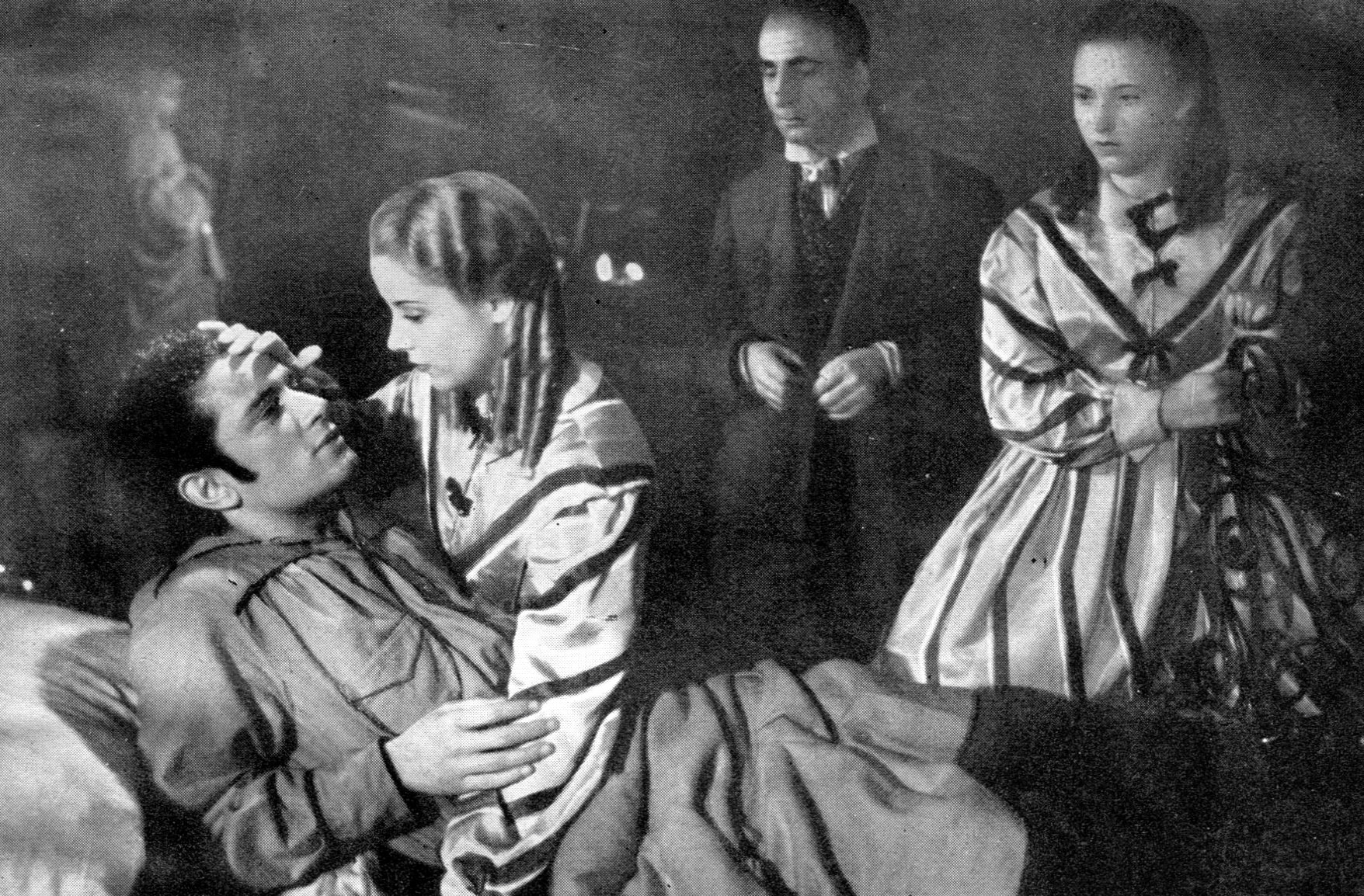
- Leonardo Cortese, María Mercader, Fausto Guerzoni and Carla Del Poggio in a scene.
- Directed by: Vittorio De Sica
- Written by: Renato Angiolillo; Adolfo Franci; Margherita Maglione; Giuseppe Zucca; Alberto Vecchietti; Vittorio De Sica
- Produced by: Mario Borghi
- Starring: Leonardo Cortese; María Mercader; Carla Del Poggio
- Cinematography: Alberto Fusi
- Edited by: Mario Bonotti
- Music by: Renzo Rossellini
- Production companies: Cristallo Film; Industria Cinematografica Italiana
- Distributed by: Industria Cinematografica Italiana
- Release date: 10 March 1942
- Running time: 83 minutes
- Country: Italy
- Language: Italian

A Garibaldian in the Convent (Italian: Un garibaldino al convento) is a 1942 Italian historical comedy drama romantic film directed by Vittorio De Sica and starring Leonardo Cortese, María Mercader and Carla Del Poggio. It is considered to be the work with which De Sica concludes the series of light comedies largely set in colleges and institutions for young girls and period costumes to enter into films of more contemporary and popular settings that will result in post-war neorealistic works. It was screened in November 1991 as a part of a retrospective of De Sica's films at the Museum of Modern Art. It was shot at the Palatino Studios in Rome. The film's sets were designed by the art director Veniero Colasanti.

== Plot ==
In the early years of the 20th century, a grandmother tells the story of a picture to her grandchildren of how many years before, in 1860, she and her rival María Mercader as Mariella Dominiani, were both students of the convent of Santa Rossana. But their lives change when a wounded Garibaldi soldier, Count Amidei is hid on the grounds by the custodian of the convent, Tiepolo. Mariella is engaged to the soldier and cares for him. But the soldier is discovered and the nuns report him to opposing soldiers, who come after him. Tiepolo, and Mariella desperately try to stop them and barricade themselves with the soldier. Here, young Carla Del Poggio as Caterinetta Bellelli jumps on a horse and is chased by the soldiers. But she reaches Garibaldi's lines and with the help of Vittorio De Sica as Nino Bixio leads then back to the convent, and gets Count Amidei back to friendly lines. However, he later dies in battle.

As the grandmother, (who is Caterinetta) finishes the story, her friend Mariella arrives, who has never married, and the granddaughters, look upon understanding now.

== Cast ==
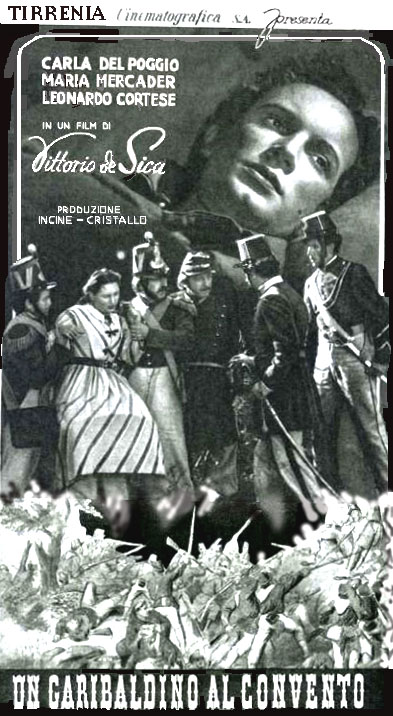
A promotion of the film in the newspapers

- Leonardo Cortese as Il conte Franco Amidei
- María Mercader as Mariella Dominiani
- Carla Del Poggio as Caterinetta Bellelli
- Fausto Guerzoni as Tiepolo, Il guardiano del convento
- Elvira Betrone as La madre superiora
- Clara Auteri as Geltrude Corbetti
- Dina Romano as Suor Ignazia
- Olga Vittoria Gentilli as La marchesa Dominiani
- Federico Collino as Giacinto Bellelli
- Armando Migliari as Raimondo Bellelli
- Lamberto Picasso as Giovanni Bellelli
- Vittorio De Sica as Nino Bixio
- Achille Majeroni as Il governatore
- Miguel del Castillo as Il capitano borbonico
- Evelina Paoli as Mariella anziana
- Adele Mosso as Caterinetta anziana
- Gilda Marchiò as La suora insegnante di musica
- Virginia Pasquali as Geltrude anziana
- Licia D'Alba as La prima nipote di Caterinetta
- Tatiana Farnese as La seconda nipote di Caterinetta

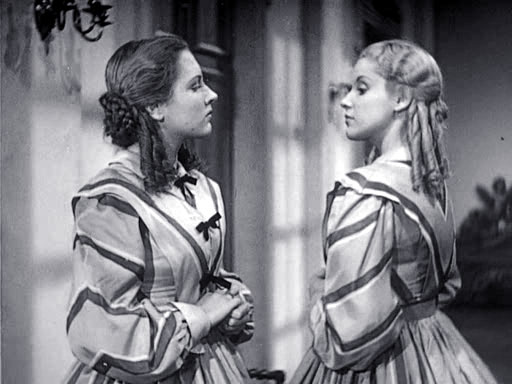
Carla Del Poggio and Maria Mercader, the two very young actresses in the film
