= The Girl with the Bruise =

1933 film

- Directed by: E. W. Emo
- Written by: Friedrich Dammann; Herbert Rosenfeld; Oreste Biancoli
- Starring: Hilda Springher; Sergio Tofano; Renato Cialente
- Cinematography: Hugo von Kaweczynski
- Music by: Franz Grothe
- Production company: Consorzio Persic
- Release date: 1933
- Running time: 65 minutes
- Countries: Germany; Italy
- Language: Italian

The Girl with the Bruise (Italian: La ragazza dal livido azzurro) is a 1933 German-Italian comedy film directed by E. W. Emo and starring Hilda Springher, Sergio Tofano, and Renato Cialente. It is the Italian-language version of the German film And Who Is Kissing Me?, which was released the same year.

== Cast ==
- Hilda Springher as La corista
- Sergio Tofano
- Renato Cialente
- Eva Magni
- Enrico Viarisio
- Pina Renzi
- Celeste Almieri

== Bibliography ==
- Stilwell, Robynn Jeananne; Powrie, Phil, eds. (2008) [2007]. Composing for the Screen in Germany and the USSR: Cultural Politics and Propaganda. Bloomington: Indiana University Press. ISBN 978-0-253-21954-1.
