= The Sons of the Marquis Lucera =

1939 film

- Directed by: Amleto Palermi
- Written by: Gherardo Gherardi (play); Ettore Maria Margadonna; Amleto Palermi
- Starring: Armando Falconi; Caterina Boratto; Sergio Tofano
- Cinematography: Massimo Terzano
- Edited by: Eraldo Da Roma
- Music by: Umberto Mancini
- Production company: Scalera Film
- Distributed by: Scalera Film
- Release date: January 1939
- Running time: 83 minutes
- Country: Italy
- Language: Italian

The Sons of the Marquis Lucera (Italian: I figli del marchese Lucera) is a 1939 Italian comedy film directed by Amleto Palermi and starring Armando Falconi, Caterina Boratto and Sergio Tofano. It is based on a play of the same name by Gherardo Gherardi.

The film was shot at Cinecittà and the Scalera Studios in Rome. The film's sets were designed by the art director Salvo D'Angelo.

The future star Mariella Lotti had a small role in the production.

== Cast ==
- Armando Falconi as Il marchese Cristoforo Maria Lucera
- Caterina Boratto as Giannina
- Sergio Tofano as Vigna
- Gino Cervi as Ermanno
- Filippo Scelzo as Salvatore
- Carlo Romano as Il 'terzo' figlio
- Camillo Pilotto as Ventura
- Clelia Matania as Soave
- Olinto Cristina as Tortorelli
- Gemma Bolognesi as Zelinda Tortorelli
- Adele Garavaglia as La nonna
- Armando Migliari
- Neda Naldi
- Anna Maria Bottini
- Gianni Agus
- Nicola Maldacea
- Mariella Lotti

== Bibliography ==
- Goble, Alan. The Complete Index to Literary Sources in Film. Walter de Gruyter, 1999.
