= The Last Days of Pompeo =

1937 film

- Directed by: Mario Mattoli
- Written by: Aldo De Benedetti
- Produced by: Liborio Capitani
- Starring: Enrico Viarisio; Roberta Mari; Camillo Pilotto
- Cinematography: Domenico Scala
- Edited by: Fernando Tropea
- Music by: Giulio Bonnard
- Production companies: Capitani Film; ENIC
- Distributed by: Generalcine
- Release date: 1937
- Running time: 72 minutes
- Country: Italy
- Language: Italian

The Last Days of Pompeo (Italian: Gli ultimi giorni di Pompeo) is a 1937 Italian "white-telephones" comedy film directed by Mario Mattoli and starring Enrico Viarisio, Roberta Mari and Camillo Pilotto. The film's title is an allusion to the novel The Last Days of Pompeii by Edward Bulwer-Lytton. It refers to a character in contemporary Italy named Pompeo.

The film was shot at Cinecittà Studios in Rome.

== Cast ==
- Enrico Viarisio as Pompeo Quarantini
- Roberta Mari as the heir
- Camillo Pilotto as the bank director
- Luigi Cimara as the lawyer
- Marcello Giorda as the police commissioner
- Armando Migliari as the American
- Franco Coop as the Merchant Navy official
- Armando Fineschi as Manolo D'Add
- Maria Donati
- Tecla Scarano
- Agostino Salvietti
- Vincenzo Scarpetta
- Dina Perbellini
- Clelia Bernacchi
- Romano Calò

== Bibliography ==
- Aprà, Adriano. The Fabulous Thirties: Italian cinema 1929-1944. Electa International, 1979.
