= I'll Always Love You (1943 film) =

1943 film

- Directed by: Mario Camerini
- Written by: Sergio Amidei; Mario Camerini; Giulio Morelli; Giorgio Pastina
- Produced by: Giampaolo Bigazzi
- Starring: Alida Valli; Gino Cervi; Antonio Centa; Jules Berry
- Cinematography: Arturo Gallea
- Edited by: Fernando Tropea
- Music by: Ezio Carabella
- Production company: Società Italiana Cines
- Distributed by: ENIC
- Release date: 5 November 1943
- Running time: 78 minutes
- Country: Italy
- Language: Italian

I'll Always Love You (Italian: T'amerò sempre) is a 1943 Italian romantic drama film directed by Mario Camerini and starring Alida Valli, Gino Cervi, Antonio Centa and Jules Berry. It was shot at the Cinecittà Studios in Rome. The film's sets were designed by the art director Gastone Medin. It is a remake of the 1933 film of the same title.

== Cast ==
- Alida Valli as Adriana
- Gino Cervi as Mario Fabbrini
- Antonio Centa as Diego
- Jules Berry as Oscar, il parrucchiere
- Adriana Serra as Clelia, sorella di Mario
- Giuseppe Porelli as Alessandro, l'inquilino curioso
- Loris Gizzi as Meregalli
- Renato Cialente as L'avvocato Pini
- Tina Lattanzi as La signora Clerici
- Lily Danesi as Jeanette
- Ernesto Calindri as Lucio
- Pina Piovani as Emma, una partoriente
- Maria Teresa Le Beau as Sonia
- Guido Morisi as Enrico
- Gilda Marchiò as La madre di una degente
- Mario Siletti as Il signore che richiede un impiego
- Egisto Olivieri as Il tutore di Adriana
- Vittorio Duse as Il fidanzato di Clelia
- Checco Rissone as Un giovane mantenuto

== Bibliography ==
- Bondanella, Peter (ed.). The Italian Cinema Book. Bloomsbury Publishing, 2019.
- Celli, Carlo & Cottino-Jones, Marga. A New Guide to Italian Cinema. Springer, 2007.
- Landy, Marcia. Fascism in Film: The Italian Commercial Cinema, 1931-1943. Princeton University Press, 2014.
