= Marionette (1939 film) =

1939 film directed by Carmine Gallone

- Film poster
- Directed by: Carmine Gallone
- Written by: Walter Forster; Otto Ernst Lubitz; Ernst Marischka; Rudo Ritter; Alberto Spaini
- Produced by: Baldassarre Negroni
- Starring: Beniamino Gigli; Carla Rust; Lucie Englisch
- Cinematography: Arturo Gallea
- Edited by: Oswald Hafenrichter
- Music by: Alois Melichar
- Production company: Itala Film
- Distributed by: ENIC
- Release date: 26 January 1939
- Running time: 95 minutes
- Country: Italy
- Language: Italian

Marionette is a 1939 Italian comedy film directed by Carmine Gallone and starring Beniamino Gigli, Carla Rust and Lucie Englisch. It featured the onscreen debut of Marcello Mastroianni as an uncredited extra.

Produced by the Italian-German company Itala Film, it was shot at the Cinecittà Studios in Rome. The film's sets were designed by the art director Guido Fiorini. A separate German version Dir gehört mein Herz was also made.

== Cast ==
- Beniamino Gigli as Il tenore Mario Rossi
- Carla Rust as Gloria Bakermann
- Lucie Englisch as Nannina, la falsa contessa Veranuzzi
- Paul Kemp as Rico
- Theo Lingen as Luigi
- Richard Romanowsky as Il maestro Galli
- Romolo Costa as Frank Davis
- Guglielmo Barnabò as Un contadino
- Nicola Maldacea as Uno stalliere
- Rio Nobile as Bellini
- Dina Romano as Emilia, una contadina
- Heinz Salfner as Lo zio di Gloria
- Friedrich Ettel as Astori, l'impresario
- Erich Kestin as Francesco, il maggiordomo
- Marcello Mastroianni as Extra

== Bibliography ==
- Donald Dewey. Marcello Mastroianni: His Life and Art. Carol Publishing Group, 1993.
