= Franco Casavola =

Italian composer

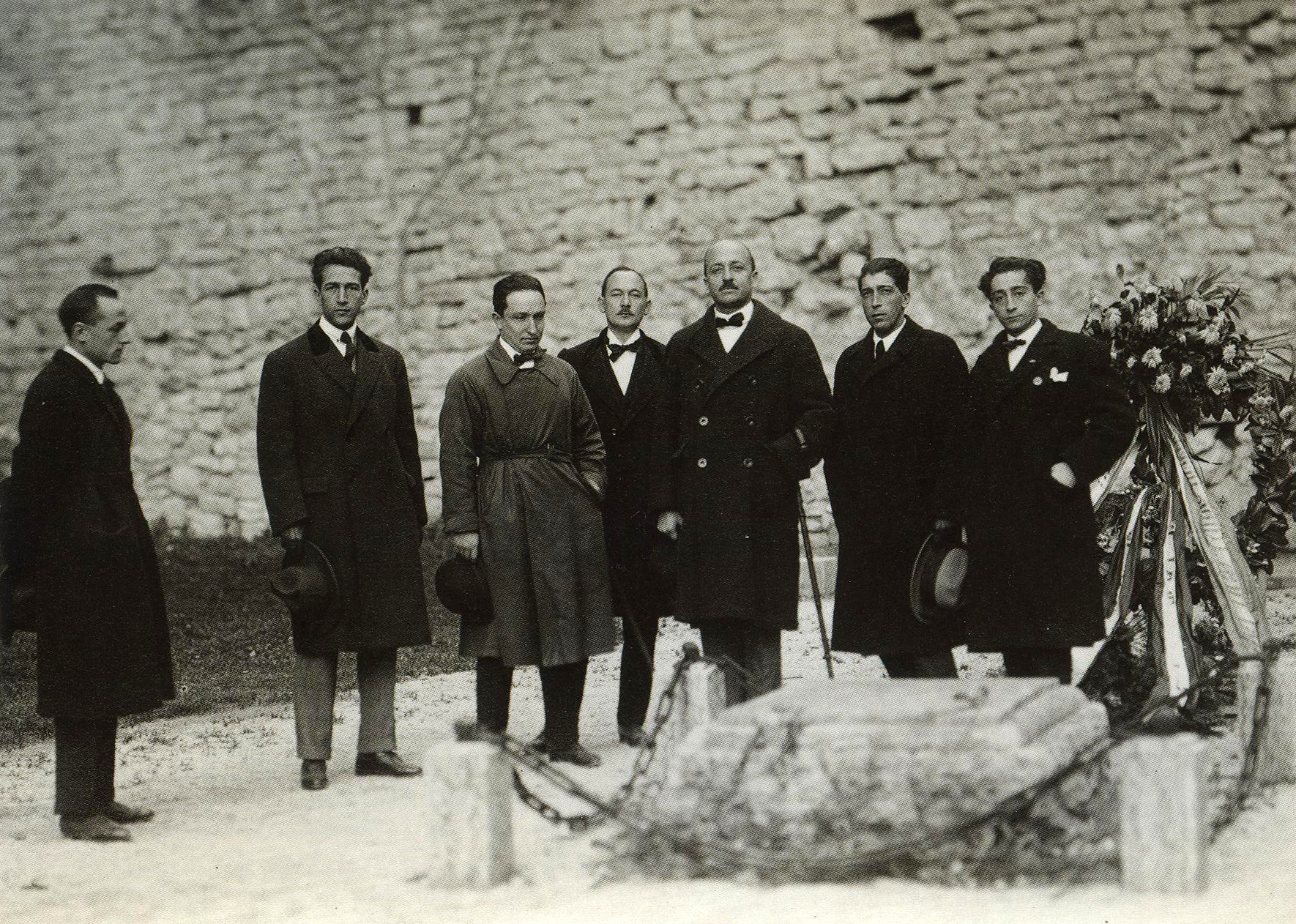

Franco Casavola (13 July 1891, in Modugno, near Bari – 7 July 1955, in Bari) was a Futurist composer and theorist. He is noted as one of the authors of the Le Sintesi Visive della Musica, a manifesto that proposed the intrinsic visual counterparts of music.

== Futurist movement ==
In a letter dated 1 October 1922, Filippo Tommaso Marinetti wrote to inform the composer, theorist and writer Franco Casavola that:

"I've listened to Tankas, Quatrain, Gioielleria Notturna, Leila and Muoio di sete on the piano. They reveal to me a strong and original musical genius. We Futurists would be pleased if you would join our fight against obsolete ideas."

Casavola (who had studied music at the Rome Conservatory) accepted this invitation and formally joined the radical Italian art movement. He began to compose new pieces under the influence of earlier manifestoes written by Marinetti and, later, the specific manifestos on Futurist music produced by Francesco Balilla Pratella and Luigi Russolo, variously dated between 1909 and 1914. Early Futurist work by Casavola included: Ranocchi al Chiaro d Luna (Frogs in the Moonlight) by A.G. Bragaglia and La Danza della Scimmie (Dance of the Monkeys) for the Teatro della Sorpresa (Theatre of Surprise).

Between 1924 and 1927, Casavola published a series of original essays and manifestos, dealing with new theories of music and its relationship with theatre and the visual arts, which are listed below. In 1924, Casavola produced no less than eight essays and one novel, Introduction to Madness. At the Futurist Congress, held in Milan on 23 November 1924, the composer also delivered a lecture entitled 'Visible Syntheses, Chromatic Atmospheres and Scenic-Plastic Versions of Music.' In 1924, he collaborated with Anton Giulio Bragaglia and Sebastiano Arturo Luciani to produce the manifesto Le Sintesi Visive della Musica (The Visual Synthesis of Music), which was published in the periodical Noi. It introduced the notion of "visual music", which implied the intrinsic visual counterparts of music. The idea is that certain types of music do not only determine gestures but also suggest landscapes and images. In the same year, he published the Manifesto of Futurist Music in which he claimed that the aesthetics of jazz should be the foundation of Futurist music.

Casavola risked opposing the escalating cultural autarchy imposed by Benito Mussolini's fascist government after it seized power late in 1922. This was demonstrated in his defense of jazz, not merely through his written articles, but also his own compositions. Many of Casavola's best pieces employed rhythms and styles closely resembling jazz forms.

== Break from futurism ==
In 1927, Casavola radically revised his views and chose to break decisively from the Futurist movement. In truth, his musical direction had already begun to display increasingly lyrical and refined qualities.

Casavola subsequently claimed to have destroyed his Futurist scores, though this is not entirely true. The location and cataloging of many of his lost scores are the results of diligent research by Grazia Sebastiani and musicological studies by Pierfranco Moliterni. The result is that today, Casavola, like fellow futurist Silvio Mix, stands as one of the most interesting Italian experimental composers of the 1920s. Certainly his status equals that of the five composers defined by Massimo Mila as 'la generazione dell'Ottanta' : Gian Francesco Malipiero, Alfredo Casella, Ottorino Respighi (who taught Casavola), Ildebrando Pizzetti and Franco Alfano.

== Surviving music ==
Certain key Futurist works by Casavola are lost, among them Anihccam del 3000, the mechanical ballet subtitled Interpretazione e riproduzione dei movimenti e rumori delle macchine, whose costumes have become enduring icons of futurism. However, the surviving scores include a Fantasia Meccanica for orchestra, and music for a stage production of Tre Momenti by Luciano Folgore, which also incorporated Luigi Russolo's revolutionary intonarumori (noise generators) and the Danza dell'Elica for ensemble. There is also the complete score of Piedigrotta, a ballet inspired by the omonimopoema parolibero of Francesco Cangiullo, in which Casavola combined the piano with traditional Neapolitan instruments such as the Scetavaiasse and Putipù, in an attempt at polyrhythmic structure. Of all the music written during this period, these compositions alone represent a significant moment, directed by the idea of creating a truly futurist musical style.

== Subsequent works ==
Following his break from Futurism, Casavola won praise for his short opera, Il Gobbo del Califfo, staged in 1929 at the Teatro dell'Opera, Rome. Other successful theatre productions included the ballet Hop Frog, Il castello nel bosco, L’alba di Don Giovanni and Il mercante di cuori, the 'sogno mimico' by Enrico Prampolini, performed in Paris in 1927 by the Teatro della Pantomima. In 1931, Casavola composed the music for the play Garara's Journey by Marinetti's wife Benedetta, and, after 1936, he wrote only film soundtracks.

== Audio ==
Recordings of the music of Franco Casavola performed by Daniele Lombardi have been released on several CDs including Futurlieder and Musica Futurista: The Art of Noises.

== Selected filmography ==
- They've Kidnapped a Man (1938)
- No Man's Land (1939)
- The Knight of San Marco (1939)
- Der singende Tor (1939)
- The Last Dance (1941)
- Carmela (1942)
- The Queen of Navarre (1942)
- Dagli Appennini alle Ande (1943)
- Resurrection (1944)
- Black Eagle (1946)
- Farewell, My Beautiful Naples (1946)
- Fury (1947)
- Buried Alive (1949)
- The Beggar's Daughter (1950)
- Red Seal (1950)
- That Ghost of My Husband (1950)
- Red Love (1952)

== See also ==
- Musica Futurista: The Art of Noises
