= Gherardo Gherardi =

Italian screenwriter

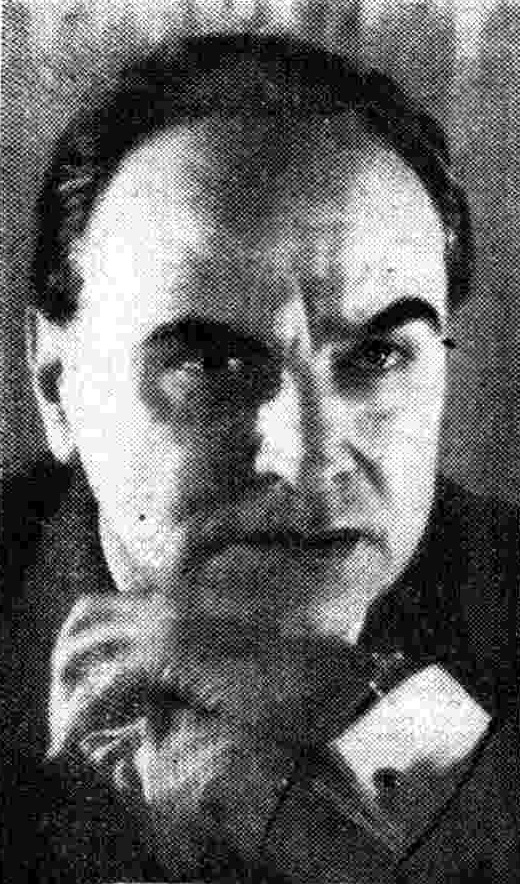
- Born: 2 July 1891; Bologna, Emilia-Romagna, Italy
- Died: 10 March 1949 (aged 57); Rome, Lazio, Italy
- Occupation: Screenwriter
- Years active: 1936–1949 (film)

Signature
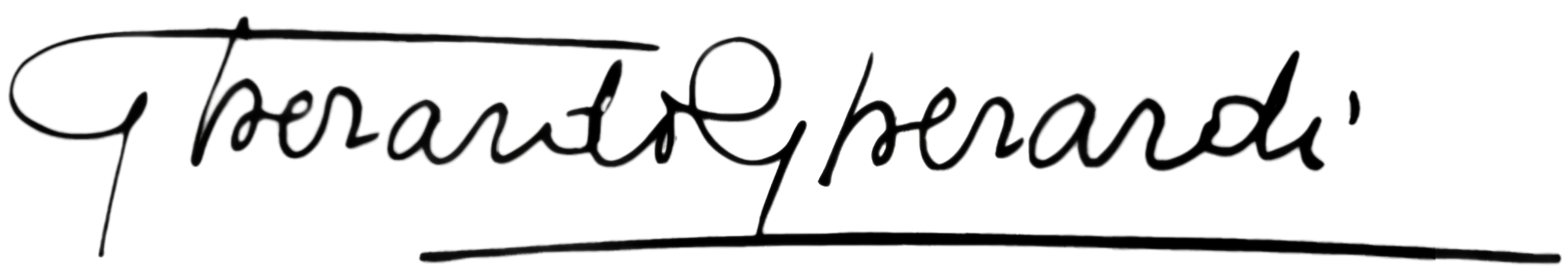

Gherardo Gherardi (1891–1949) was an Italian screenwriter. He co-wrote the screenplay for Vittorio De Sica's 1948 neorealist classic Bicycle Thieves. Originally a playwright, he worked prolifically in the Italian film industry following its rapid expansion during the late Fascist era.

== Selected filmography ==
- The Countess of Parma (1936)
- Music in the Square (1936)
- The Two Sergeants (1936)
- Adam's Tree (1936)
- These Children (1937)
- Doctor Antonio (1937)
- The Three Wishes (1937)
- Triumph of Love (1938)
- Departure (1938)
- It Always Ends That Way (1939)
- The Knight of San Marco (1939)
- A Thousand Lire a Month (1939)
- The Sons of the Marquis Lucera (1939)
- Red Tavern (1940)
- Caravaggio, il pittore maledetto (1941)
- Blood Wedding (1941)
- The Secret Lover (1941)
- A Pilot Returns (1942)
- The Queen of Navarre (1942)
- Giarabub (1942)
- Luisa Sanfelice (1942)
- Odessa in Flames (1942)
- C'è sempre un ma! (1942)
- Signorinette (1942)
- The Taming of the Shrew (1942)
- The Children Are Watching Us (1943)
- Farewell Love! (1943)
- Mist on the Sea (1944)
- L'abito nero da sposa (1945)
- The Song of Life (1945)
- Before Him All Rome Trembled (1946)
- Fire Over the Sea (1947)
- Bicycle Thieves (1948)
- Eleven Men and a Ball (1948)
- Buried Alive (1949)

== Bibliography ==
- Landy, Marcia. Fascism in Film: The Italian Commercial Cinema, 1931-1943. Princeton University Press, 2014.
