= Maria Malibran (film) =

1943 film

- Directed by: Guido Brignone
- Written by: Howard Bushnell (novel); Guido Cantini; Franco Riganti; Tomaso Smith; Thea von Harbou
- Starring: Maria Cebotari; Rossano Brazzi; Renato Cialente
- Cinematography: Anchise Brizzi
- Edited by: Fernando Tropea
- Music by: Renzo Rossellini
- Production companies: Alleanza Cinematografica Italiana; Itala Film
- Distributed by: Alleanza Cinematografica Italiana
- Release date: 20 January 1943
- Running time: 85 minutes
- Country: Italy
- Language: Italian

Maria Malibran is a 1943 Italian historical drama film directed by Guido Brignone and starring Maria Cebotari, Rossano Brazzi, and Renato Cialente. It is based on the life of the Spanish singer Maria Malibran. It was shot at the Cinecittà Studios in Rome. The film's sets were designed by the art directors Virgilio Marchi and Gino Brosio.

== Cast ==
- Maria Cebotari as Maria Malibran
- Rossano Brazzi as Carlo de Beriot
- Renato Cialente as Il conte Ernesto Malibran
- Rina Morelli as Angelina
- Loris Gizzi as Giovacchino Rossini
- Roberto Bruni as Vincenzo Bellini
- Silvia de Bettini as Enrichetta Sontag
- Aldo Silvani as Lablache
- Armando Migliari as Il direttore del teatro lirico londinese
- Amilcare Pettinelli as L'impresario
- Romano Boris
- Gustav Diessl
- Nicola Maldacea
- Argia Micchettoni
- Ernesto Sabbatini

== Bibliography ==
- Fawkes, Richard (2000). Opera on Film. London: Duckworth. ISBN 978-0-7156-2943-7.
