= Dina Romano =

Italian actress (1876–1957)

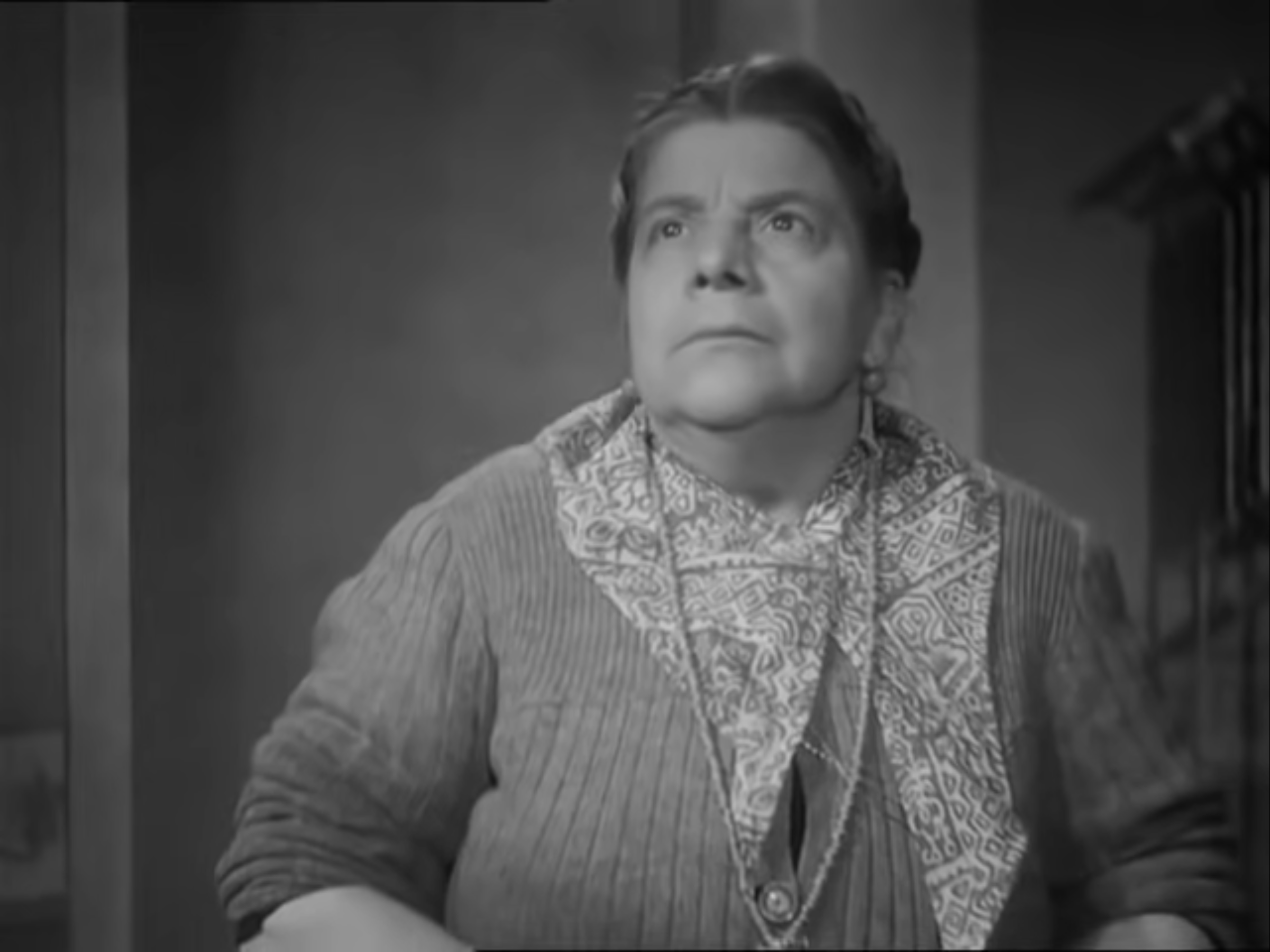
- Romano in The Materassi Sisters (1944)
- Born: Geltrude Ricci; 16 February 1876; Pistoia, Italy
- Died: 24 March 1952 (aged 76); Rome, Italy
- Occupation: Actress
- Years active: 1933–1952
- Children: Felice; Carlo

Dina Romano (born Geltrude Ricci; 16 February 1876 – 24 March 1952) was an Italian stage and film actress. She appeared in more than fifty films during her career including The Materassi Sisters (1944).

== Selected filmography ==
- Aldebaran (1935)
- The Ancestor (1936)
- God's Will Be Done (1936)
- Adam's Tree (1936)
- But It's Nothing Serious (1936)
- The Three Wishes (1937)
- The Two Mothers (1938)
- A Thousand Lire a Month (1939)
- Marionette (1939)
- The Hotel of the Absent (1939)
- Saint John, the Beheaded (1940)
- First Love (1941)
- The Adventuress from the Floor Above (1941)
- The Brambilla Family Go on Holiday (1941)
- A Garibaldian in the Convent (1942)
- Fedora (1942)
- The Materassi Sisters (1944)
- The Two Orphans (1947)
- The Flame That Will Not Die (1949)
- Love and Blood (1951)
- Shadows Over Naples (1951)

== Bibliography ==
- Landy, Marcia. The Folklore of Consensus: Theatricality in the Italian Cinema, 1930-1943. SUNY Press, 1998.
