= The Flower Girl from the Grand Hotel =

1934 film directed by Carl Boese

- Directed by: Carl Boese
- Written by: Eberhard Frowein (novel); Robert A. Stemmle
- Produced by: Alberto Giacalone
- Starring: Elsa Merlini; Georg Alexander; Hans Brausewetter
- Cinematography: Eduard Hoesch
- Edited by: Hilde Grebner
- Music by: Eduard Künneke
- Production company: Itala Film
- Distributed by: Itala Film
- Release date: 11 April 1934
- Running time: 80 minutes
- Country: Germany
- Language: German

The Flower Girl from the Grand Hotel (German: Das Blumenmädchen vom Grand-Hotel) is a 1934 German drama film directed by Carl Boese and starring Elsa Merlini, Georg Alexander and Hans Brausewetter. The film's sets were designed by the art directors Gustav A. Knauer and Alexander Mügge. A separate Italian-language version The Lucky Diamond was also produced starring Merlini with a different supporting cast.

== Synopsis ==
A flower girl working at a grand hotel encounters a diamond that brings her luck and adventure.

== Cast ==
- Elsa Merlini as Lis
- Georg Alexander as Eduard Swalt
- Hans Brausewetter as Fritz Peters
- Fritz Odemar as Der Diener Hermann
- Julius Falkenstein as Hoppe, Taxichauffeur
- Hans Richter as Tommy, ein Straßenjunge
- Jakob Tiedtke as Flindt, Theaterdirektor
- Theo Lingen as Thumser, Spielleiter
- Alfred Beierle as Putzke, Besitzer eines Warenhauses
- Hans Hemes as Brösicke, Rayonschef
- Annie Markart as Gaby, Revuestar
- Heinz Lingen as Ballett
- Erich Fiedler
- Werner Finck

== Bibliography ==
- Cardullo, Bert. Screening the Stage: Studies in Cinedramatic Art. Peter Lang, 2006.
- Klaus, Ulrich J. Deutsche Tonfilme: Jahrgang 1934. Klaus-Archiv, 1988.
- Rentschler, Eric. The Ministry of Illusion: Nazi Cinema and Its Afterlife. Harvard University Press, 1996.
