= Triumph of Love (1938 film) =

1938 film

- Directed by: Mario Mattoli
- Written by: Aldo De Benedetti; Gherardo Gherardi; Mario Mattoli
- Starring: Paola Barbara; Vittorio De Sica; Giuditta Rissone
- Cinematography: Arturo Gallea
- Production company: Romulus Film
- Distributed by: Romulus Film
- Release date: March 1938
- Running time: 70 minutes
- Country: Italy
- Language: Italian

Triumph of Love (Italian: Il Trionfo dell'amore) is a 1938 Italian comedy film directed by Mario Mattoli and starring Paola Barbara, Vittorio De Sica and Giuditta Rissone.

== Cast ==
- Paola Barbara as Giovanna
- Vittorio De Sica as Vincenzo
- Armando Migliari as Doctor
- Giuditta Rissone as Aunt Lucia
- Enrico Viarisio as Giangiacomo

== Bibliography ==
- Darretta, John. Vittorio De Sica: A Guide to References and Resources. G.K. Hall, 1983.
