= Premiere (1938 film) =

1938 film directed by Walter Summers

- John Lodge, Edmund Breon and Hugh Williams in the film
- Directed by: Walter Summers
- Written by: Friedrich Dammann; Max Wallner; F. McGrew Willis
- Produced by: Walter C. Mycroft
- Starring: John Lodge; Judy Kelly; Joan Marion; Hugh Williams
- Cinematography: Otto Kanturek
- Edited by: Lionel Tomlinson
- Music by: Dénes Buday; Szabolcs Fényes
- Production company: Associated British
- Distributed by: Associated British
- Release date: October 1938
- Running time: 71 minutes
- Country: United Kingdom
- Language: English

Premiere (also known as One Night in Paris) is a 1938 British musical mystery film directed by Walter Summers and starring John Lodge, Judy Kelly, Joan Marion and Hugh Williams. It was written by Friedrich Dammann, Max Wallner and F. McGrew Willis, and shot at Elstree Studios. It was a close remake of the 1937 Austrian film Premiere and re-used a number of musical scenes from the original which were dubbed into English.

== Plot ==
In Paris, leading theatre impresario Renoir is murdered on opening night, shortly after replacing his leading lady. A police Inspector in the audience takes over the investigation.

== Cast ==
- John Lodge as Inspector Bonnard
- Judy Kelly as Carmen Daviot
- Joan Marion as Lydia Lavalle
- Hugh Williams as Rene Nissen
- Edward Chapman as Lohrmann
- Steven Geray as Frolich
- Edmund Breon as Morel
- Wallace Geoffrey as Renoir
- Geoffrey Sumner as Captain Curry
- Joss Ambler as spectator
- Jack Lambert as stage manager

== Reception ==
The Monthly Film Bulletin wrote: "An exciting, well-directed production. The contrast of the drama behind the scenes and the glitter and excitement of the stage show gives double value to the suspense and mystery of the plot. The leading players are admirable and are supported by an exceptionally strong and well-cast team."

Kine Weekly wrote: "Ingenious and workmanlike murder mystery melodrama played against Paris theatre setting. ... Mystery angle is helped by good quota of humour in alm which is excellent of its kind."

The Daily Film Renter wrote: "Culprit's identity well hidden until denouement, and unravelling of problem by ace sleuth has suspenseful moments. ... Sound popular offering wilh spectacle as engaging background to the action."
