= Paradise for Two (1937 film) =

- Original trade ad
- Directed by: Thornton Freeland
- Written by: Arthur Macrae; Robert Stevenson; William Kernell; Robert Liebmann
- Produced by: Alexander Korda
- Starring: Jack Hulbert; Patricia Ellis; Arthur Riscoe
- Cinematography: Günther Krampf
- Edited by: Edward B. Jarvis
- Music by: Mischa Spoliansky
- Production company: London Films
- Distributed by: London Films; United Artists (US)
- Release dates: 22 December 1937 (London, UK)
- Running time: 77 minutes
- Country: United Kingdom
- Language: English

Paradise for Two (U.S title: The Gaiety Girls) is a 1937 British musical comedy film directed by Thornton Freeland and starring Jack Hulbert, Patricia Ellis, and Arthur Riscoe. It was written by Arthur Macrae, Robert Stevenson, William Kernell and Robert Liebmann. It is a loose remake of the 1933 German film And Who Is Kissing Me?

A chorus girl is mistaken for a millionaire's girlfriend.

== Plot ==
When Parisian chorus girl Jeannette gets splashed by millionaire banker Rene Martin’s car, his chauffeur gives her a lift. Rumours quickly link Jeannette with Martin, prompting her producer to re-hire her as a star. Learning his name is being exploited, Martin visits Jeannette to complain, but falls in love at first sight and woos her disguised as a reporter. His deception leads to chaotic adventures, until he finally reveals his identity – backing Jeannette's show, accidentally co-starring i it, and winning her heart.

== Cast ==
- Jack Hulbert as Rene Martin
- Patricia Ellis as Jeannette
- Arthur Riscoe as Jacques Thibaud
- Googie Withers as Miki
- Sydney Fairbrother as Miss Clare
- Wylie Watson as Clarence
- David Tree as Marcel
- Cecil Bevan as Renaud
- H. F. Maltby as director
- Anthony Holles as Brand
- Roland Culver as Paul Duval
- Finlay Currie as creditor
- Martita Hunt as Madame Bernard

== Production ==
The film's budget was approximately £80,000. It was made at Denham Studios, with sets designed by Vincent Korda.

== Critical reception ==
The Monthly Film Bulletin wrote: "The plot is refreshingly simple and the film is very well directed and photographed. While the action takes place in Paris, the characters use French names, British accents, and American expressions, but they are well cast. Jack Hulbert is at his best, and is well partnered by Patricia Ellis as Jeannette, who has a pleasant voice and manner. A very entertaining film."

Kine Weekly wrote: "Jolly back-stage romantic comedy musical, slickly tailored to fit the wide resource and amiable personality and versatility of Jack Hulbert. Set in a colourful Parisian atmosphere, the sprightly story snappily unfolds to the accompaniment of tunefal numbers and culminates in dazzling laughter-making spectacle."

Variety wrote: "There is still a hope for British pictures when they can turn out anything approaching this one, which looks surefire here, and should be more than acceptable for the American market. ... Possibly not promising in plot, but it is brilliantly produced. Dialog is bright and witty and there are innumerable ludicrous situations. Excellent production particularly in photography, lighting and direction."

== See also ==
- Happy Go Lovely (1951)
