= Armando Migliari =

Italian actor (1889–1976)

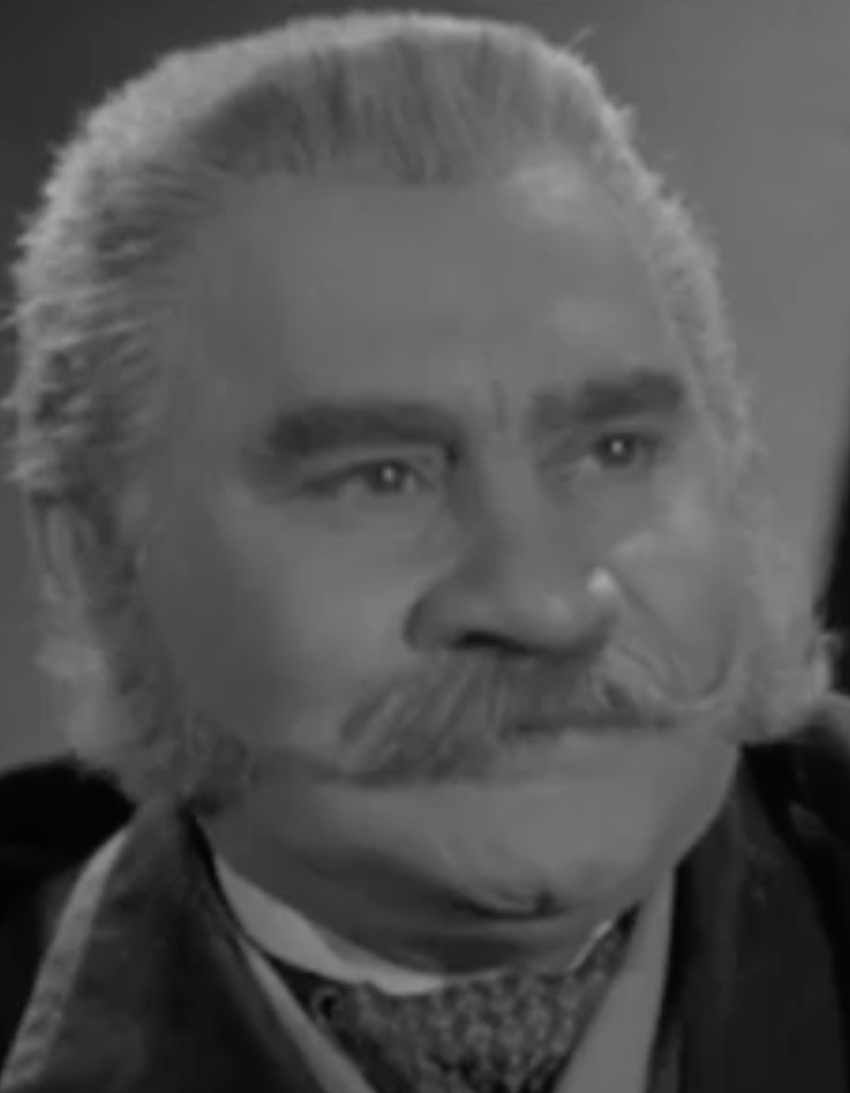
- Migliari in 1940
- Born: 29 April 1887; Frosinone, Kingdom of Italy
- Died: 15 June 1976 (aged 89); Rome, Italy
- Occupation: Actor
- Years active: 1914–1965

Armando Migliari (29 April 1887 – 15 June 1976) was an Italian film actor. He appeared in 103 films between 1914 and 1965.

== Selected filmography ==
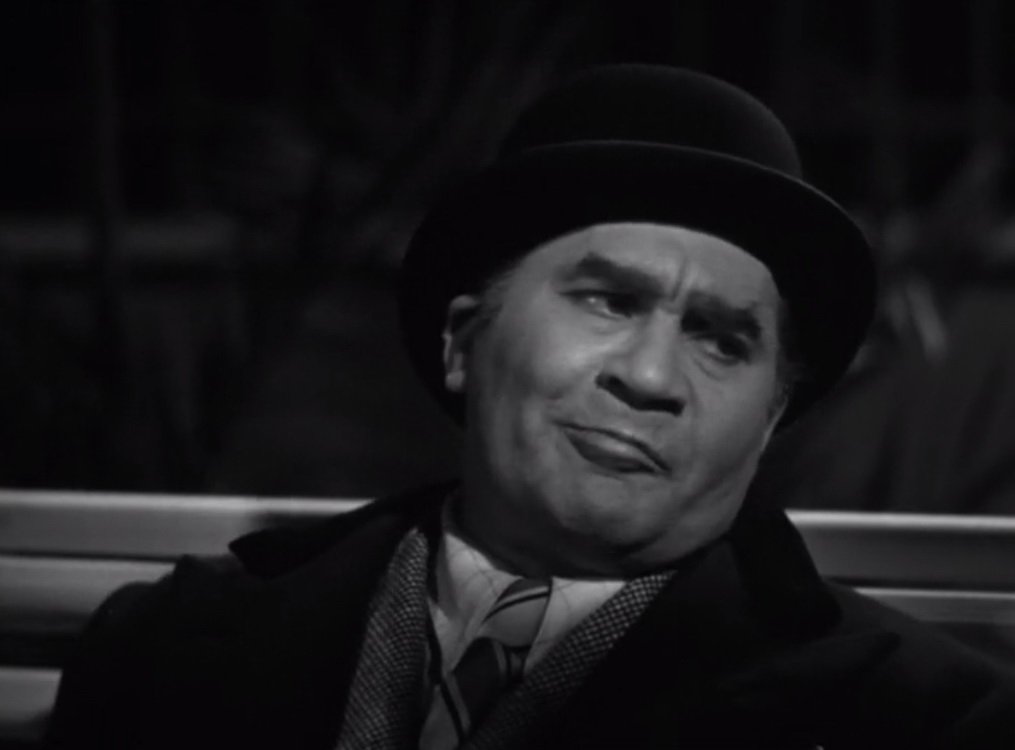
Migliari in Defendant, Stand Up! (1939)

- Cura di baci (1916)
- I fioretti di San Francisco (1917)
- La moglie scacciata (1919)
- The Last of the Bergeracs (1934)
- La Damigella di Bard (1936) - Amilcare Pacotti
- To Live (1936) - L'impresario Arden
- L'uomo che sorride (1937) - Agostino
- These Children (1937) - Il dottore Andrea
- The Castiglioni Brothers (1937) - Camillo Castiglioni
- Nina non far la stupida (1937) - Teodoro - il padre di Nina
- It Was I! (1937) - Barone Scaletta
- The Last Days of Pompeo (1937) - L'americano
- The Count of Brechard (1938) - Roberto
- Destiny (1938)
- Triumph of Love (1938) - Doctor
- A Lady Did It (1938)
- Jeanne Doré (1938) - Rozan
- L'amor mio non muore! (1938)
- Heartbeat (1939) - il commissario Dupont
- The Two Mothers (1939) - Il barbiere
- The Sons of the Marquis Lucera (1939)
- At Your Orders, Madame (1939) - Il notaio
- Naples Will Never Die (1939) - Daspuro
- The Marquis of Ruvolito (1939) - Il barone di Mezzomondello
- Belle o brutte si sposan tutte... (1939) - Zio Matteo
- Il barone di Corbò (1939) - Teodorico
- Bionda sotto chiave (1939)
- Piccolo hotel (1939)
- We Were Seven Widows (1939) - Il medico
- Due occhi per non vedere (1939) - Il professore Santoro
- Defendant, Stand Up! (1939) - Il ladro Vetriolo
- In the Country Fell a Star (1939) - Teodorico, il farmacista
- Retroscena (1939) - (uncredited)
- Lo vedi come sei... lo vedi come sei? (1939) - L'imbonitore al lunapark
- Wealth Without a Future (1940)
- Vento di milioni (1940)
- Giù il sipario (1940) - Lo zio del commediografo
- Antonio Meucci (1940) - Elisha Gray
- La gerla di papà Martin (1940) - Il visconte
- Alessandro sei grande! (1940) - Fabbri
- A Romantic Adventure (1940) - Il padre di Annetta
- La danza dei milioni (1940) - Il direttore generale
- Inspector Vargas (1940)
- La fanciulla di Portici (1940) - Garcìa
- Maddalena, Zero for Conduct (1940) - Malesci - il professore di chimica
- Teresa Venerdì (1941) - L'impiegato postale
- The Last Dance (1941) - Il capo cameriere Vittorio
- La scuola dei timidi (1941) - Il commendator Granata
- I Live as I Please (1942) - Il padre di Stefano
- Se io fossi onesto (1942) - Il giudice Vasani
- A Garibaldian in the Convent (1942) - Raimondo Bellelli
- Invisible Chains (1942) - Il commissario
- Soltanto un bacio (1942) - Il direttore generale del Credito Industriale
- Once a Week (1942) - Giacomo Macrè - padre di Laura
- La fabbrica dell'imprevisto (1942) - Il trezo vagabondo
- Miliardi, che follia! (1942) - Il dottor Garcia
- The Taming of the Shrew (1942) - Il commendator Guarnacci
- Luisa Sanfelice (1942) - Lord Aston
- Wedding Day (1942) - Il venditore di mobili
- The Countess of Castiglione (1942) - Un amico degli Oldoini (uncredited)
- Il romanzo di un giovane povero (1942)
- Torrents of Spring (1942) - Il nonno in attesa
- Sealed Lips (1942) - Il commissario
- Colpi di timone (1942) - L'avvocato Baratti
- Signorinette (1942)
- Nothing New Tonight (1942) - Il direttore del giornale
- Four Steps in the Clouds (1942) - Antonio - il capostazione
- Maria Malibran (1943) - Il direttore del teatro lirico londinese
- Giacomo the Idealist (1943) - Il signor Mangano
- Music on the Run (1943) - Il commissario
- L'amico delle donne (1943) - Hackendorf, padre di Elena
- Il viaggio del signor Perrichon (1943)
- Four Steps in the Clouds (1943) - Un cliente di Pinto
- The Children Are Watching Us (1943) - Il commendatore
- A Little Wife (1943)
- Il fiore sotto gli occhi (1944)
- La casa senza tempo (1945) - Il commissario
- L'onorevole Angelina (1947) - Callisto Garrone
- Cab Number 13 (1948)
- Heart and Soul (1948) - Direttore della scuola
- The Man with the Grey Glove (1948) - Commissario P.S.
- Totò Le Mokò (1949) - Claude Cleim (uncredited)
- Duel Without Honor (1950)
- Ho sognato il paradiso (1950) - Pasquale
- Santo disonore (1950) - Presidente
- Tomorrow Is Too Late (1950) - Il preside
- The Transporter (1950) - Il signor Montero
- La taverna della libertà (1950)
- The Ungrateful Heart (1951) - Pubblico Ministero
- Cameriera bella presenza offresi... (1951) - Il legale dei Leonardi
- The Last Sentence (1951) - Giuseppe Andreani, farmacista
- Little World of Don Camillo (1952) - Brusco della Bruciata
- Toto in Color (1952) - Il sindaco di Caianiello
- Gli uomini non guardano il cielo (1952) - Il medico
- Primo premio: Mariarosa (1952)
- The Piano Tuner Has Arrived (1952) - Commissario Filippini
- Cardinal Lambertini (1954) - Il dottore
- La tua donna (1954) - Commendatore
- Il Conte di Matera (1958) - Antonio
- Don Camillo: Monsignor (1961) - Un esponente democristiano (uncredited)
- Appuntamento in riviera (1962)
- Don Camillo in Moscow (1965) - Christian-Democrat representative
