= Fausta Cialente =

Italian novelist, journalist and political activist

Fausta Terni Cialente (29 November 1898 – 11 March 1994) was an Italian novelist, journalist and political activist. She is a recipient of the Strega Prize.

== Early life ==
Cialente was born on 29 November 1898 in Cagliari, Sardinia. She was the second child of Alfredo Cialente, an army officer originally from the Abruzzo region in central Italy and Elsa Wieselberger who had trained as a soprano and came from a musical family in Trieste. Her elder brother Renato (1897–1943) became an actor and appeared in many films. Fausta's early life was marked by upheaval as the family followed the movements of her father. In 1921 she married Enrico Terni (1876–1960), a banker from a Jewish family of Italian origin who had settled in Alexandria, Egypt in the early nineteenth century. Enrico was a musician and a composer. Cialente's only daughter, Lionella (called Lili), was born in 1923. Although based in Alexandria the family would spend long holidays in Italy.

== Writings and later life ==
Cialente's first novel Natalia, completed in 1927, treated the lesbian relationship of an unhappily married woman. It was published in Rome in 1930 and won the Dieci Savi Prize. When the initial print run of 3000 copies had been sold, her publisher wanted to print more copies but the censors in the Fascist regime asked for two sections of the book to be revised. Cialente refused and the book was not reprinted but in 1932 a French translation was published in France. In 1930 her short story "Marianna" was published in the literary magazine L'Italia Letteraria which was edited by Giambattista Angioletti. Her first novel with an Egyptian setting, Cortile a Cleopatra, was completed in 1931. She tried unsuccessfully to persuade the prestigious publisher Mondadori to accept the work. It was serialized in L'Italia letteraria in 1935 and published as a book in 1936.

From 1940 she wrote antifascist pamphlets and made daily broadcasts from Radio Cairo against the Fascist regime in Italy. In 1947 she returned to Italy, living there until moving to England in 1984.

Many of Cialente's subsequent stories were set in Egypt. "The position of her female characters preoccupies Cialente throughout her work, not least in the semi-autobiographical Le quattro ragazze Wieselberger", which won the Strega Prize.

She died in Pangbourne on 11 March 1994.

== Works ==
- Cialente, Fausta (1930). Natalia: romanzo (in Italian). Rome: Sapientia, Edizioni dei Dieci. OCLC 955167272.
- Cialente, Fausta (1930). "Marianna". L'Italia Letteraria. 6. Republished in Interno con figure (1976).
- Cialente, Fausta (1936). Cortile a Cleopatra (in Italian). Milan: A. Corticelli. OCLC 13873407.
- Cialente, Fausta (1961). Ballata levantina. Biblioteca di letteratura. I contemporanei, 25 (in Italian). Milan: Feltrinelli. OCLC 977921413.
- Cialente, Fausta (1966). Un inverno freddissimo: romanzo. I narratori di Feltrinelli, 87 (in Italian). Milan: Feltrinelli. OCLC 1572178.
- Cialente, Fausta (1972). Il vento sulla sabbia: romanzo (in Italian). Milan: Mondadori. OCLC 223416696.
- Cialente, Fausta (1976). Interno con figure (in Italian). Rome: Riuniti. OCLC 251671916. A collection of short stories. Includes an autobiographical postface.
- Cialente, Fausta (1976). Le quattro ragazze Wieselberger: romanzo (in Italian). Milan: Mondadori. OCLC 247228244.

=== Translated into English ===
- Cialente, Fausta (1962). The Levantines. Translated by Quigly, Isabel. New York: Houghton Mifflin.
- Cialente, Fausta (2026). A Very Cold Winter. Translated by Nelsen, Julia. Berkeley: Transit Books. ISBN 979-8893380231.
