= Fernando Tropea =

Italian film editor

- Occupation: Editor
- Years active: 1932–1952 (film)

Fernando Tropea (5 May 1905 – 7 July 1985, in Castel San Pietro Romano) was a prolific Italian film editor, who worked on around ninety films during his twenty-year career. During the Fascist era he worked on films such as Naples of Former Days (1938) and Carmen fra i rossi (1939).

== Selected filmography ==
- What Scoundrels Men Are! (1932)
- Your Money or Your Life (1932)
- I'll Always Love You (1933)
- The Haller Case (1933)
- Unripe Fruit (1934)
- Like the Leaves (1935)
- Those Two (1935)
- The Divine Spark (1935)
- Casta Diva (1935)
- The Man Who Smiles (1936)
- God's Will Be Done (1936)
- The Phantom Gondola (1936)
- But It's Nothing Serious (1936)
- Adam's Tree (1936)
- The Great Appeal (1936)
- The Amnesiac (1936)
- Joe the Red (1936)
- A Woman Between Two Worlds (1936)
- The Love of the Maharaja (1936)
- Abandon All Hope (1937)
- The Two Misanthropists (1937)
- The Last Days of Pompeo (1937)
- Naples of Olden Times (1938)
- They've Kidnapped a Man (1938)
- The Two Mothers (1938)
- A Lady Did It (1938)
- Departure (1938)
- Castles in the Air (1939)
- Naples Will Never Die (1939)
- Defendant, Stand Up! (1939)
- The Siege of the Alcazar (1940)
- Light in the Darkness (1941)
- Bengasi (1942)
- Nothing New Tonight (1942)
- Sealed Lips (1942)
- Fourth Page (1942)
- I Live as I Please (1942)
- Invisible Chains (1942)
- Luisa Sanfelice (1942)
- Annabella's Adventure (1943)
- Lively Teresa (1943)
- I'll Always Love You (1943)
- Maria Malibran (1943)
- Life Begins Anew (1945)
- Departure at Seven (1946)
- Fury (1947)
- The Legend of Faust (1949)
- Beauties on Bicycles (1951)
- Free Escape (1951)

== Sources ==
- Cardullo, Bert. Vittorio De Sica: Director, Actor, Screenwriter. McFarland, 2002.
- Hortelano, Lorenzo J. Torres. Directory of World Cinema: Spain. Intellect Books, 2011.
