= Elsa Merlini =

Italian actress

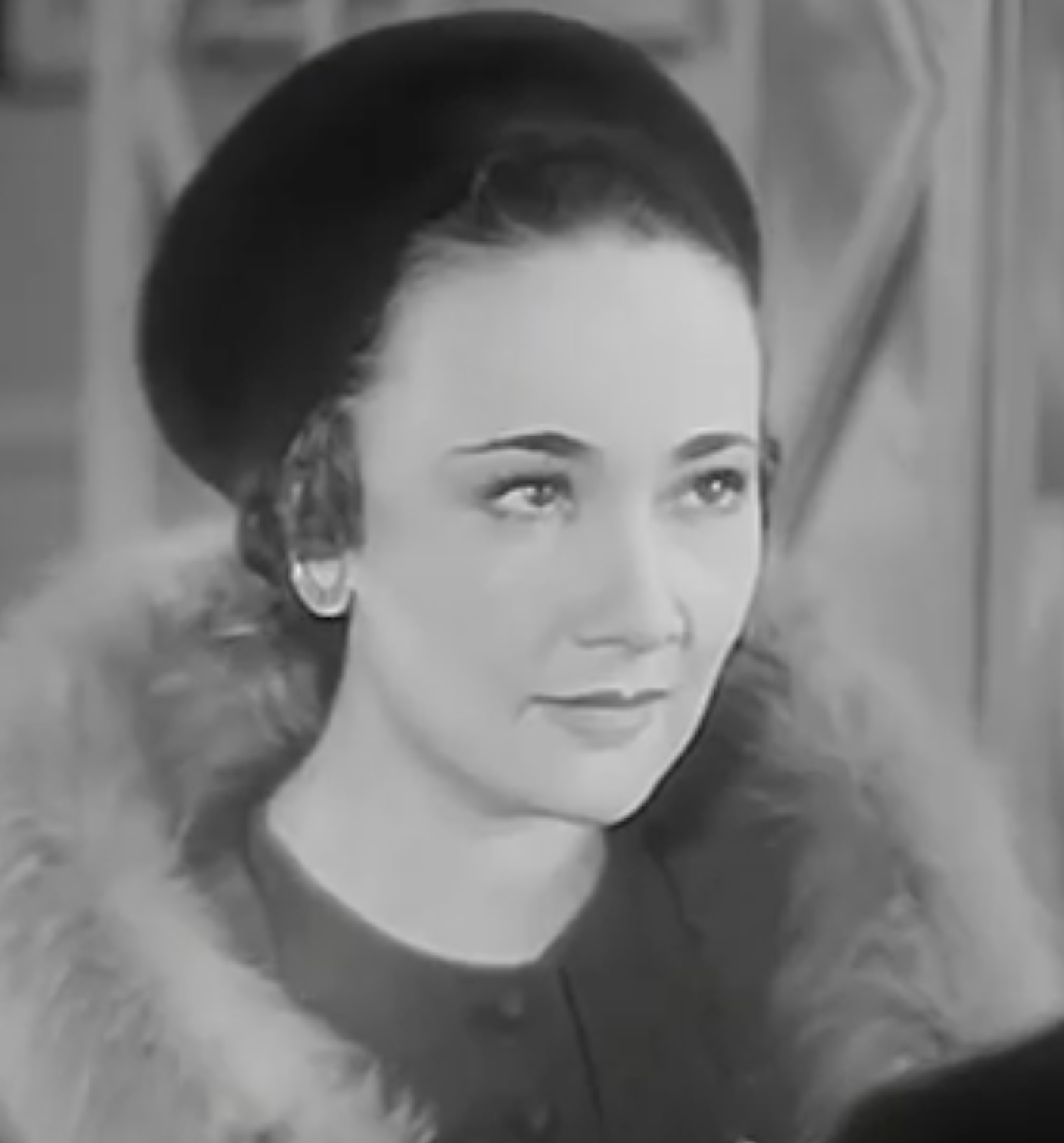
- Merlini in the movie I Don't Know You Anymore (1936)
- Born: 26 July 1903; Trieste, Kingdom of Italy
- Died: 22 February 1983 (aged 79); Rome, Italy
- Occupation: Actress
- Years active: 1931–1976

Elsa Merlini (26 July 1903 – 22 February 1983), was an Italian film actress. She appeared in 29 films between 1931 and 1976.

== Selected filmography ==
- The Private Secretary (1931)
- One Night with You (1932)
- Paprika (1933)
- Model Wanted (1933)
- The Flower Girl from the Grand Hotel (1934)
- The Lucky Diamond (1934)
- Ginevra degli Almieri (1935)
- Thirty Seconds of Love (1936)
- Adam's Tree (1936)
- I Don't Know You Anymore (1936)
- The Lady in White (1938)
- At Your Orders, Madame (1939)
- The Last Dance (1941)
- The Queen of Navarre (1942)
- Legs of Gold (1958)
