= Giacomo Debenedetti =

Italian writer

Giacomo Debenedetti (Biella, 25 June 1901 – Rome, 20 January 1967) was an Italian writer, essayist and literary critic. He was one of the greatest interpreters of literary criticism in Italy in the 20th century, one of the first to embrace the lessons of psychoanalysis and the human sciences in general, and among the first to grasp the full extent of Marcel Proust's genius.

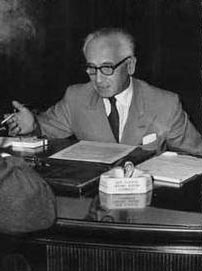
Giacomo Debenedetti

== Biography ==
Giacomo Debenedetti was born into a Jewish family in Biella but moved to Turin at a very young age. After completing his secondary education with excellent marks, he enrolled in the local university and then in three degree courses: mathematics, law and literature. In 1922, with Sergio Solmi and Mario Gromo, he founded the literary magazine "Primo Tempo", which closed after only eleven issues. He met Piero Gobetti, with whom he developed a brief but intense friendship, and began a fruitful collaboration with the magazine "Il Baretti", in which he published important essays on Raymond Radiguet, Umberto Saba and Marcel Proust. He became one of the participants in the experience of the magazine "Solaria".

In 1926 Debenedetti published his first book of fiction, Amedeo e altri racconti (1926), and in 1929 the first of the volumes in the Saggi critici series. Between the 1930s and 1940s, he continued to write the second series of Saggi critici (1945). In the 1930s he also began to work in cinema as a scriptwriter for Cines, under a false name because of the racial laws issued by the Fascist regime, and was forced to go into hiding even after moving to Rome, during the most acute moments of repression, before and during the Second World War.

== Second World War ==
Between October 1943 and May 1944, he was in Cortona in the house of San Pietro a Cegliolo, where he took refuge with his family and colleagues Pietro Pancrazi and Nino Valeri during the German occupation of Rome. During this period he wrote Vocazione di Vittorio Alfieri, in which the author emphasised the need for a rediscovery of Vittorio Alfieri, a tragic author and great defender of individual freedom and opposed to any form of monarchical power. For a publication of Vocazione di Vittorio Alfieri, however, we will have to wait until 1959, the year of its publication in the 3rd volume of Saggi critici, published in Milan by the publisher Il Saggiatore; before this date, only some parts of the book could be read, thanks to the publication of these in various Italian magazines such as "Fiera letteraria", "Letteratura e arte contemporanea" and "Poesia" between 1945 and 1951.

In June 1944, after the liberation of Rome, Debenedetti joined the partisan formations operating in the Tuscan Apennines and in December 1944 he published a text in the Roman magazine "Mercurio", 16 Ottobre1943, describing the peaceful eve and subsequent day of the rounding up of the Jewish ghetto in Rome. Debenedetti is, with Silvia Forti Lombroso and Luciano Morpurgo, one of the first witnesses to tackle the problem of Jewish persecution in Italy in an autobiographical account, not from the perspective of those who were deported to extermination camps but of those who were forced into hiding during the war years. In 1945 the book was reprinted in Lugano in "Libera Stampa" and in Rome in the O.E.T. editions; in 1947 Jean Paul Sartre promoted the French translation, which was printed in "Les Temps Modernes". Also in 1944, he published the short story Otto ebrei, an episode of the trial of Quaestor Pietro Caruso, during which the Commissioner of Public Security Alianello declared that he had eliminated eight names of Jews from the list of hostages designated for execution at the Fosse Ardeatine.

== The post-war period ==
After the painful period of racial persecution, he became a lecturer in Italian literature, first at the University of Messina, then at the University of Rome, publishing the third series of Saggi critici (1959). On three occasions (1962, 1964, 1967) he tried to become a full professor, but was rejected, in one of the most notorious "scandals" in the history of the Italian academy.

In 1958 he took part in the founding of the publishing house Il Saggiatore by Alberto Mondadori, Arnoldo Mondadori's son, and became the director of the fiction series "Biblioteca delle Silerchie", reproposing texts closely linked to the "Solaria" experience.

Debenedetti continued to deal with literary criticism in the 1950s and 1960s with essays and books, but he did not manage to see most of his vast critical production published, which was published posthumously by his wife Renata Orengo: Il personaggio uomo (1970), Il romanzo del Novecento (1971), Poesia italiana del Novecento (1974), Verga e il naturalismo (1976), Personaggi e destino. La metamorfosi del romanzo contemporaneo (1977), Vocazione di Vittorio Alfieri (1977), Pascoli: la rivoluzione inconsapevole (1979), Rileggere Proust (1982), Quaderni di Montaigne (1986).

== Acknowledgements ==
- In 1967, the Accademia Nazionale dei Lincei awarded him the Feltrinelli Prize for essay writing.
- In 1971, in the context of the Viareggio Prize, he was awarded the Special Prize in Memory.

== Critical thought ==
Trained in Croce criticism, Debenedetti soon moved away from it, attracted by forms of knowledge outside the horizon of the Italian literary critical tradition alone: turning to the study of foreign authors (he was among the first to grasp the full extent of the genius of Proust, whose name recurs frequently in his writings), and maturing his criticism in a European context, configuring it moreover as a search for the "reasons" of the author, The author's aim was not the revelation of an objective datum, but the expression of an inner problem, so much so that one can recognise in it suggestions from psychoanalysis, from Sigmund Freud to Carl Gustav Jung, and from Edmund Husserl's phenomenology, but also sociology and cultural anthropology.

The richness and novelty of his readings translate into an activity as a critic who does not want to close himself off within a method; ready to analyse, together with the symbols and myths of the authors, as they were dropped into the reality of the works, also his own subjectivity as a reader, especially when faced with his best-loved texts (Giovanni Pascoli, Italo Svevo, Federigo Tozzi, Umberto Saba).

Years earlier, in an interview that was never collected in a volume, Debenedetti had focused his attention on the need that drove the narrator in our century to "chase" the character, to know his secret motivations, and the obvious ones, and then dissolve all ties with him:

"Today it is clear that the early novels of our century gave out a distorted, suffering image of man, that this image had to "open like a peel" (I use Proust's words), "epiphanise" (I use James Joyce's), reveal the person behind the spirited and protean contortions of the character (I am referring to Pirandello) in order to get to the head of a protesting and gagged human nucleus, kept in mora, prevented from expressing itself by a world, by a society no longer in agreement with itself".

Debenedetti's critical thought revolves around the question of man, as a person, and he does so with the same purpose and identical cognitive criterion as a narrator (as he was in writings such as Amedeo e altri racconti, Otto ebrei, 16 ottobre 1943). His entire literary life has moved in the fictional universe. This sort of perpetual intervention in the imagination of others ended up clashing with the unhappiness and neurosis of modern man, and led the writer and critic to hone a particular aptitude for recognising in the destiny of fictional characters their insecurity and crisis of identity. Debenedetti wrote and outlined a "provisional commemoration" of this disappearance in the essay Il personaggio uomo. Debenedetti felt a nostalgia for the male character, just as he declared himself convinced of the need not to abandon the values of literature to the lure of mass civilisation. Returning to the interview, one of his final statements, more than forty years later, unravels some of the knots on the debated question of the critic's function:

"At the risk of seeming out of date, the critic must save for the next day the values, transiently disavowed, if he really believes they are values. Provided that he is not mistaken (but then this is immediately apparent from the flaws in his critical demonstration), each of those values will appear as a necessary stage in reaching new and profound forms of expression".

== Works ==
=== Fiction ===
- Amedeo e altri racconti, 1926
- Otto ebrei, 1944
- 16 Ottobre 1943, 1945

=== Essays and criticism ===
- Saggi critici, 3 volumes:

Volume I: Saggi critici, 1929

Volume II: Saggi critici. Nuova serie, 1945

Volume III: Saggi critici. Terza Serie, 1952

- Radiorecita su Marcel Proust, 1952
- Intermezzo, 1963

=== Books published posthumously ===
- II personaggio uomo, 1970
- Il romanzo del Novecento, 1971
- Niccolò Tommaseo, 1973
- Poesia italiana del Novecento, 1974
- Verga e il naturalismo, 1976
- Vocazione di Vittorio Alfieri, 1977
- Pascoli: la rivoluzione inconsapevole, 1979
- Rileggere Proust e altri saggi proustiani, 1982
- Al cinema, 1983
- Quaderni di Montaigne, 1986
- Preludi. Le note editoriali alla "Biblioteca delle Silerchie", 1991
- Profeti. Cinque conferenze del 1924, 1998
- Proust, 2005
- Savinio e le figure dell'invisibile, 2009
- Cinema. Il destino di raccontare, 2018

=== Selected filmography (as a scriptwriter) ===
- The Taming of the Shrew (1942)
- The Priest's Hat (1944)
