= List of Italian films of 1939 =

A list of films produced in Italy under Fascist rule in 1939 (see 1939 in film):

== A-L ==
Title	Director	Cast	Genre	Notes
L' Amore si fa così		Enrico Viarisio, Nino Marchesini		
Angelica	Jean Choux	Viviane Romance, Georges Flamant, Guillaume de Sax	Adventure	Co-production with France
An Adventure of Salvator Rosa	Alessandro Blasetti	Gino Cervi, Luisa Ferida, Osvaldo Valenti	Adventure	
At Your Orders, Madame	Mario Mattoli	Elsa Merlini, Vittorio De Sica	Comedy	
Backstage	Alessandro Blasetti	Elisa Cegani, Camillo Pilotto	Comedy	
The Boarders at Saint-Cyr	Gennaro Righelli	Vanna Vanni, Silvana Jachino, Maurizio D'Ancora	Historical comedy	
Cardinal Messias	Goffredo Alessandrini	Camillo Pilotto, Enrico Glori	Drama	
The Carnival of Venice	Giacomo Gentilomo	Cesco Baseggio, Junie Astor	Comedy	
The Castle Ball	Max Neufeld	Alida Valli, Antonio Centa	Comedy	
Castles in the Air	Augusto Genina	Lilian Harvey, Vittorio De Sica	Comedy	
Defendant, Stand Up!	Mario Mattoli	Erminio Macario, Ernesto Almirante, Greta Gonda	Comedy	
Department Store	Mario Camerini	Vittorio De Sica, Assia Noris, Virgilio Riento	Comedy	
Diamonds	Corrado D'Errico	Doris Duranti, Lamberto Picasso	Comedy	
The Document	Mario Camerini	Armando Falconi, María Denis	Comedy	
Dora Nelson	Mario Soldati	Assia Noris, Carlo Ninchi	Comedy	Remake of the 1935 French film
The Dream of Butterfly	Carmine Gallone	Maria Cebotari, Fosco Giachetti, Germana Paolieri	Musical drama	Co-production with Germany
Father For a Night	Mario Bonnard	Sergio Tofano, Clelia Matania, Carlo Romano	Comedy	
The Fornaretto of Venice	Duilio Coletti	Roberto Villa, Elsa De Giorgi	Drama	
Frenzy	Mario Bonnard	Dina Galli, Antonio Gandusio, Betty Stockfeld	Comedy	
Guest for One Night	Giuseppe Guarino	Gian Paolo Rosmino, Ugo Sasso	Mystery	
Heartbeat	Mario Camerini	Assia Noris, John Lodge, Rubi D'Alma	Comedy	
The Hotel of the Absent	Raffaello Matarazzo	Paola Barbara, Carla Candiani, Camillo Pilotto	Thriller	
Hurricane in the Tropics	Gino Talamo	Fosco Giachetti, Osvaldo Valenti	Adventure	
I, His Father	Mario Bonnard	Erminio Spalla, Mariella Lotti, Clara Calamai	Sports	
In the Country Fell a Star	Eduardo De Filippo	Peppino De Filippo, Rosina Lawrence	Comedy	
It Always Ends That Way	Enrique Susini	Vittorio De Sica, Nedda Francy, Roberto Rey	Comedy	
The Knight of San Marco	Gennaro Righelli	Mario Ferrari, Laura Nucci	Historical	

== M-Z ==
Title	Director	Cast	Genre	Notes
Mad Animals	Carlo Ludovico Bragaglia	Totò, Luisa Ferida, Lilia Dale	Comedy	
Marionette	Carmine Gallone	Beniamino Gigli, Carla Rust, Lucie Englisch	Comedy	Marcello Mastroianni's first film
The Marquis of Ruvolito	Raffaello Matarazzo	Eduardo De Filippo, Peppino De Filippo, Leda Gloria	Comedy	
Mille chilometri al minuto!	Mario Mattoli	Nino Besozzi, Antonio Gandusio	Comedy	
Naples Will Never Die	Amleto Palermi	Fosco Giachetti, Marie Glory	Comedy	
The Night of Tricks	Carlo Campogalliani	Amedeo Nazzari, Dria Paola, Maurizio D'Ancora	Comedy	
No Man's Land	Mario Baffico	Mario Ferrari, Nelly Corradi, Laura Solari	Drama	
The Silent Partner	Roberto Roberti	Carlo Romano, Clara Calamai	Drama	
The Sons of the Marquis Lucera	Amleto Palermi	Armando Falconi, Caterina Boratto, Gino Cervi	Comedy	
A Thousand Lire a Month	Max Neufeld	Alida Valli, Osvaldo Valenti	Comedy	
Two Million for a Smile	Carlo Borghesio, Mario Soldati	Enrico Viarisio, Elsa De Giorgi, Sandra Ravel	Comedy	
Unjustified Absence	Max Neufeld	Alida Valli, Amedeo Nazzari	Comedy	
Lo vedi come sei... lo vedi come sei?	Mario Mattoli	Erminio Macario, Enzo Biliotti, Greta Gonda	Comedy	
La voce senza volto	Gennaro Righelli	Vanna Vanni, Laura Nucci, Carlo Romano	Comedy	
We Were Seven Sisters	Nunzio Malasomma	Antonio Gandusio, Paola Barbara	Comedy	
We Were Seven Widows	Mario Mattoli	Antonio Gandusio, Laura Nucci	Comedy	
Wealth Without a Future	Ferdinando Maria Poggioli	Lamberto Picasso, Paola Borboni	Drama	
Who Are You?	Gino Valori	María Denis, Antonio Centa	Comedy	
The Widow	Goffredo Alessandrini	Isa Pola, Leonardo Cortese	Drama	
A Wife in Danger	Max Neufeld	Marie Glory, Carlo Lombardi, Laura Solari	Comedy	

== See also ==
- List of Italian films of 1938
- List of Italian films of 1940
