= After Casanova's Fashion =

1942 film directed by Carlo Ludovico Bragaglia

- Directed by: Carlo Ludovico Bragaglia
- Written by: Armando Curcio; Peppino De Filippo; Carlo Ludovico Bragaglia
- Starring: Eduardo De Filippo; Peppino De Filippo; Clelia Matania
- Cinematography: Rodolfo Lombardi
- Edited by: Gabriele Varriale
- Music by: Giulio Bonnard
- Production companies: Società Italiana Cines; Juventus Film
- Distributed by: ENIC
- Release date: 5 December 1942
- Running time: 133 minutes
- Country: Italy
- Language: Italian

After Casanova's Fashion (Italian: Casanova farebbe così!) is a 1942 Italian comedy film directed by Carlo Ludovico Bragaglia and starring Eduardo De Filippo, Peppino De Filippo, and Clelia Matania.

It was shot at the Cinecittà Studios in Rome. The film's sets were designed by the art directors Alfredo Montori and Mario Rappini.

== Cast ==
- Eduardo De Filippo as Don Ferdinando
- Peppino De Filippo as Don Agostino
- Clelia Matania as Maria Grazia
- Giorgio De Rege as Ernestino
- Nietta Zocchi as Donna Rosalia
- Gildo Bocci as Pacchialone
- Giovanni Conforti as Il maggiordomo
- Ciro Berardi as Un cliente del barbiere
- Roberto Bianchi Montero as Un giocatore di biliardo
- Aristide Garbini as Il maresciallo
- Nicola Maldacea as Il barbiere
- Eduardo Passarelli as Un giocatore di biliardo
- Mario Pucci
- Alberto Sordi as Un giocatore di biliardo

== Bibliography ==
- Moliterno, Gino. The A to Z of Italian Cinema. Scarecrow Press, 2009.
