= Torrents of Spring (1942 film) =

1942 film directed by Nunzio Malasomma

- Directed by: Nunzio Malasomma
- Written by: Nunzio Malasomma; Sergio Pugliese
- Produced by: Raffaele Colamonici
- Starring: Gino Cervi; Mariella Lotti; Vanna Vanni
- Cinematography: Vincenzo Seratrice
- Edited by: Gabriele Varriale
- Music by: Guido Razzi
- Production companies: Juventus Film; Società Italiana Cines
- Distributed by: ENIC
- Release date: 12 November 1942
- Running time: 85 minutes
- Country: Italy
- Language: Italian

Torrents of Spring (Italian: Acque di primavera) is a 1942 Italian drama film directed by Nunzio Malasomma and starring Gino Cervi, Mariella Lotti and Vanna Vanni. It was shot at the Cinecittà Studios in Rome. The film's sets were designed by the art directors Alfredo Montori and Mario Rappini.

== Cast ==
- Gino Cervi as Francesco
- Mariella Lotti as Ilse, sua moglie
- Vanna Vanni as La dottoressa Anna Soldani
- Paolo Stoppa as Il dottore Berni
- Carlo Lombardi as Alberto Claubert
- Annibale Betrone as Il professore Weber
- Marina Doge as Lucia
- Wanda Capodaglio as La zia di Ilse
- Vittorina Benvenuti as La capo infermiera
- Armando Migliari as Il nonno in attesa
- Joop van Hulzen as La guida alpina nella baita
- Edda Soligo as Un'infermiera

== Bibliography ==
- Roberto Chiti & Enrico Lancia. I film: Tutti i film italiani dal 1930 al 1944. Gremese Editore, 2005.
