= Telefoni Bianchi =

Italian film genre

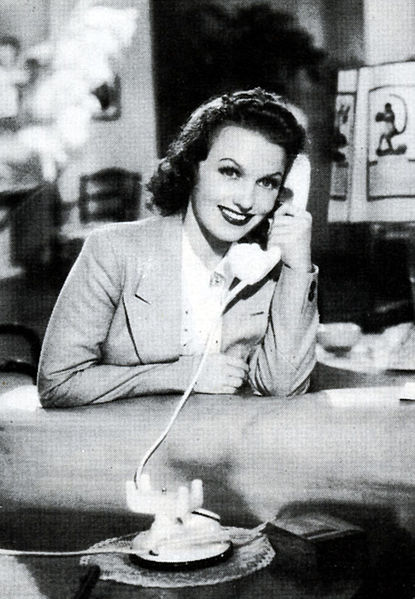
The House of Shame by Max Neufeld (1938)

Telefoni Bianchi (pronounced [teˈlɛːfoni ˈbjaŋki]; white telephones) films, also called deco films, were made by the Italian film industry in the 1930s and the 1940s in imitation of American comedies of the time in a sharp contrast to the other important style of the era, calligrafismo, which was highly artistic. The cinema of Telefoni Bianchi was born from the success of the Italian film comedies of the early 1930s; it was a lighter version, cleansed of any intellectualism or veiled social criticism.

== Name ==
The name derives from the presence of white telephones in the sequences of the first films produced in this period, symptomatic of social well-being, a status symbol capable of marking the difference from the "popular" Bakelite telephones, cheaper and therefore more widespread, which instead were black. Another definition given to these films is "deco cinema" due to the strong presence of furnishing objects that recall the international deco style, in vogue in those years.

== Origins ==
The roots of Telefoni Bianchi as a genre can be found in Mario Camerini's films of the 1920s, in particular Rails (1929), in which the director photographed — with reverberations of German expressionist cinema and then-contemporary Soviet avant-garde films — the reality of the crisis years, in real time. The first film associated with the genre was The Private Secretary (1931) by Goffredo Alessandrini.

== Overview ==
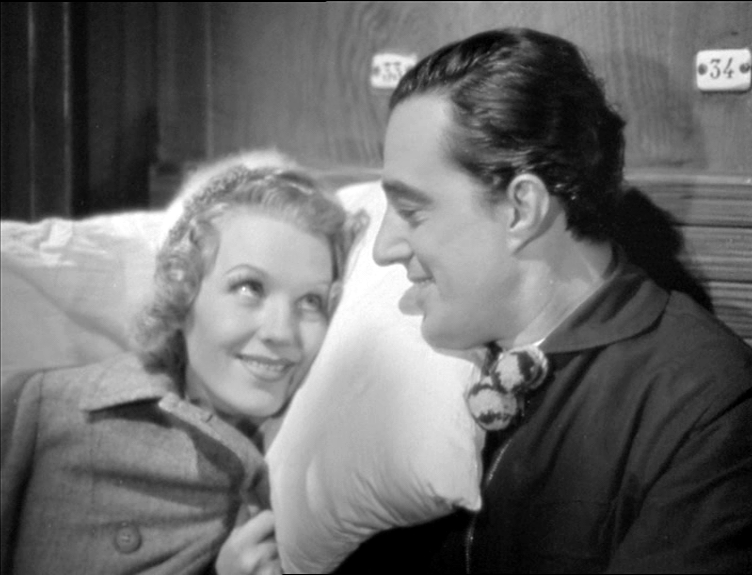
Department Store by Mario Camerini (1939)

In the 1930s and the 1940s, light comedies like those of Telefoni Bianchi were predominant in Italian cinema. These films featured lavish set designs and promoted conservative values and respect for authority, typically avoiding the scrutiny of government censors. Telefoni Bianchi proved to be the testing ground of numerous screenwriters destined to impose themselves in the following decades (including Cesare Zavattini and Sergio Amidei), and above all of numerous set designers such as Guido Fiorini, Gino Carlo Sensani and Antonio Valente, who, by virtue of successful graphic inventions led these productions to become a kind of "summa" of the petite bourgeoisie aesthetics of the time.

Among the authors, Mario Camerini is the most representative director of the genre. After having practiced the most diverse trends in the 1930s, he happily moved into the territory of sentimental comedy with What Scoundrels Men Are! (1932), Il signor Max (1937) and Department Store (1939). In other films he compares himself with the Hollywood-style comedy on the model of Frank Capra (Heartbeat, 1939) and the surreal one of René Clair (I'll Give a Million, 1936). Camerini is interested in the figure of the typical and popular Italian, so much so that he anticipates some elements of the future Italian comedy. His major interpreter, Vittorio De Sica, will continue his lesson in Maddalena, Zero for Conduct (1940) and Teresa Venerdì (1941), emphasizing above all the direction of the actors and the care for the settings.

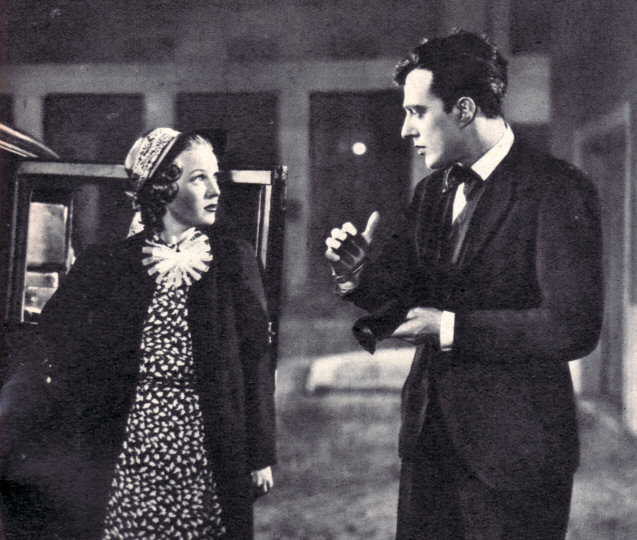
Il signor Max by Mario Camerini (1937)

Other directors include Mario Mattoli (Schoolgirl Diary, 1941), Jean de Limur (Apparition, 1944) and Max Neufeld (The House of Shame, 1938; A Thousand Lire a Month, 1939). The realist comedies of Mario Bonnard (Before the Postman, 1942; The Peddler and the Lady, 1943) are partially different in character, which partially deviate from the imprint of Telefoni Bianchi. Soon the subjects began to become repetitive and more and more predictable and banal; later, with the worsening of World War II, the production of this genre became more and more sparse and discontinuous until it disappeared completely with the fall of the Fascist regime (1943).

== Characteristics ==
The most important symbol in these films are the quite expensive Art Deco sets featuring white telephones, a status symbol of bourgeois wealth generally unavailable to the movie-going public, and children wearing Shirley Temple curls. The films tended to be socially conservative, promoting family values, respect for authority, a rigid class hierarchy and country life. The genre is also referred by modern film critics as "Hungarian style comedies", because the scripts were often adaptations of stage plays written by Hungarian authors (a popular source material also for Hollywood productions of the time).

The functionalism of the Bauhaus also arrived in Italy and, as can be seen in these films, there was a reflection of an Italy that was "rebuilding" its own modern and efficient image and in which the consumerism was timidly beginning to spread. It was represented by the rationalist architectural style and the industrial ferment that the fascist regime was promoting; in these light films there was a fascination that glimpsed hope in the future.

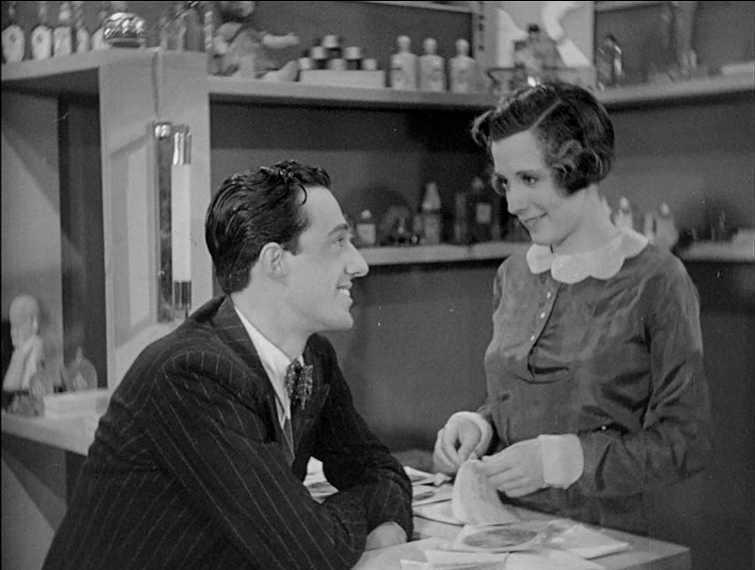
What Scoundrels Men Are! by Mario Camerini (1932)

The bourgeois setting aesthetically echoed American film comedies, especially Frank Capra. The hopes of the petty-bourgeois could only become reality. Films like A Thousand Lire a Month, as well as the song of the same name, went down in history for their explicit lightheartedness and equally irreverent evocation. The melodic element often returned to peep out, many of these films contained at least one hit song (just think Parlami d'amore Mariù composed for the film What Scoundrels Men Are! which later became much more famous than the film itself).

However, this representation of well-being and progress was far from the Italian reality of the time; the representation of a wealthy (in some cases even opulent), advanced, emancipated and educated society was enormously contrasting with the real situation of Italy, which, at that time, was instead a substantially poor country, materially and morally backward and with the majority of the illiterate population. As well as the enthusiastic, cheerful and carefree atmosphere of these films, it seemed to clash with the gloomy situation of the nation, subjugated by the fascist dictatorship and which would soon enter World War II.

== Major figures ==
Among the most relevant directors for this genre are: Mario Camerini, Alessandro Blasetti, Mario Bonnard, Mario Mattoli, Carlo Ludovico Bragaglia, Max Neufeld and Gennaro Righelli. Among the most representative actors and actresses: Caterina Boratto, Assia Noris, Cesco Baseggio, Elsa Merlini, Rossano Brazzi, Clara Calamai, Lilia Silvi, Vera Carmi, Gino Cervi, Valentina Cortese, Vittorio De Sica, Doris Duranti, Luisa Ferida, Fosco Giachetti, Amedeo Nazzari, Alida Valli, Carlo Campanini and Checco Rissone.

== Censorship ==
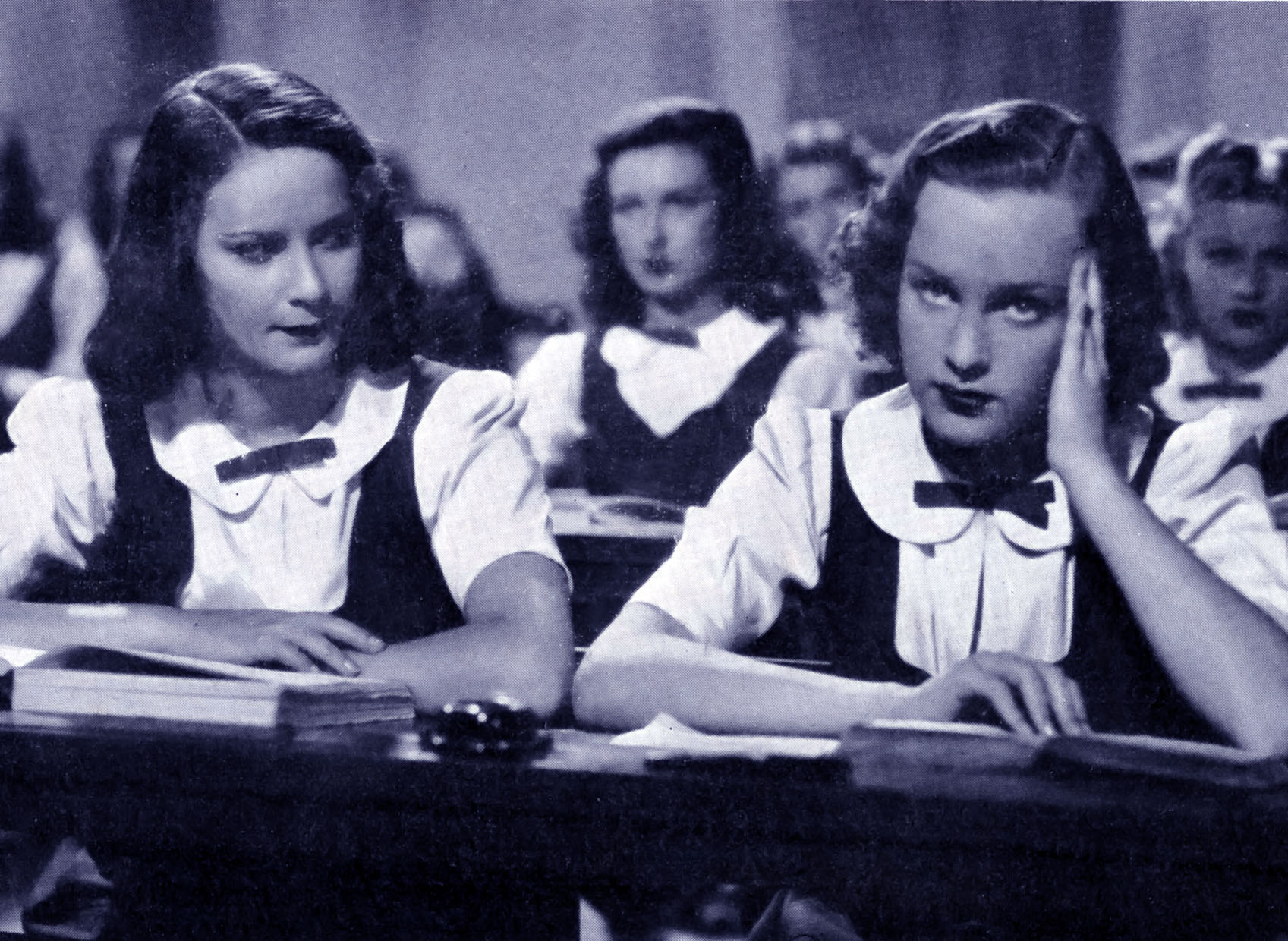
Schoolgirl Diary by Mario Mattoli (1941)

To avoid the limitations imposed by the censorship of the authorities, with potentially controversial topics in the plot (for instance divorce, at the time illegal in Italy, or adultery, a punishable offence by the contemporary Italian laws), the action was often set in various foreign – sometimes imaginary – Eastern European countries, but always with Italian protagonists.

== Effect on neorealism ==
The Neorealist filmmakers saw their gritty films as a reaction to the idealized and mainstream quality of the Telefoni Bianchi style. They compared and contrasted the high-and-almighty gimmicks of set and studio production, with the dishevelled beauty of everyday life, the rigorous depiction of human life and its sufferings, and chose instead to work on location and with non-professional actors.

== Aftermath ==
In Federico Fellini's film Amarcord (1973), the popular film movement is satirized in Gradisca's sex dream with the Prince. The era of Telefoni Bianchi films is remembered in the 1976 film The Career of a Chambermaid, directed by Dino Risi.

== Notable films ==
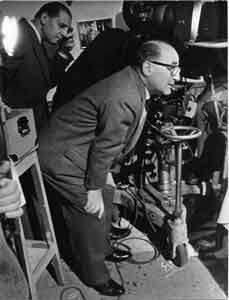
Mario Camerini

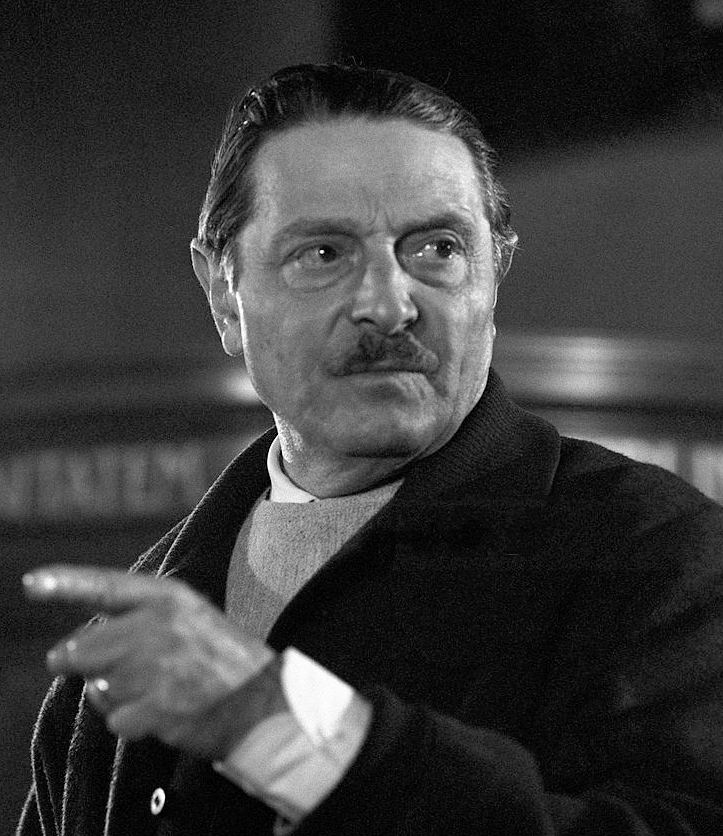
Alessandro Blasetti

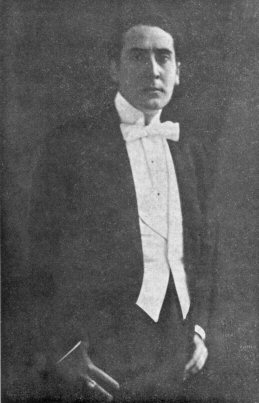
Mario Bonnard

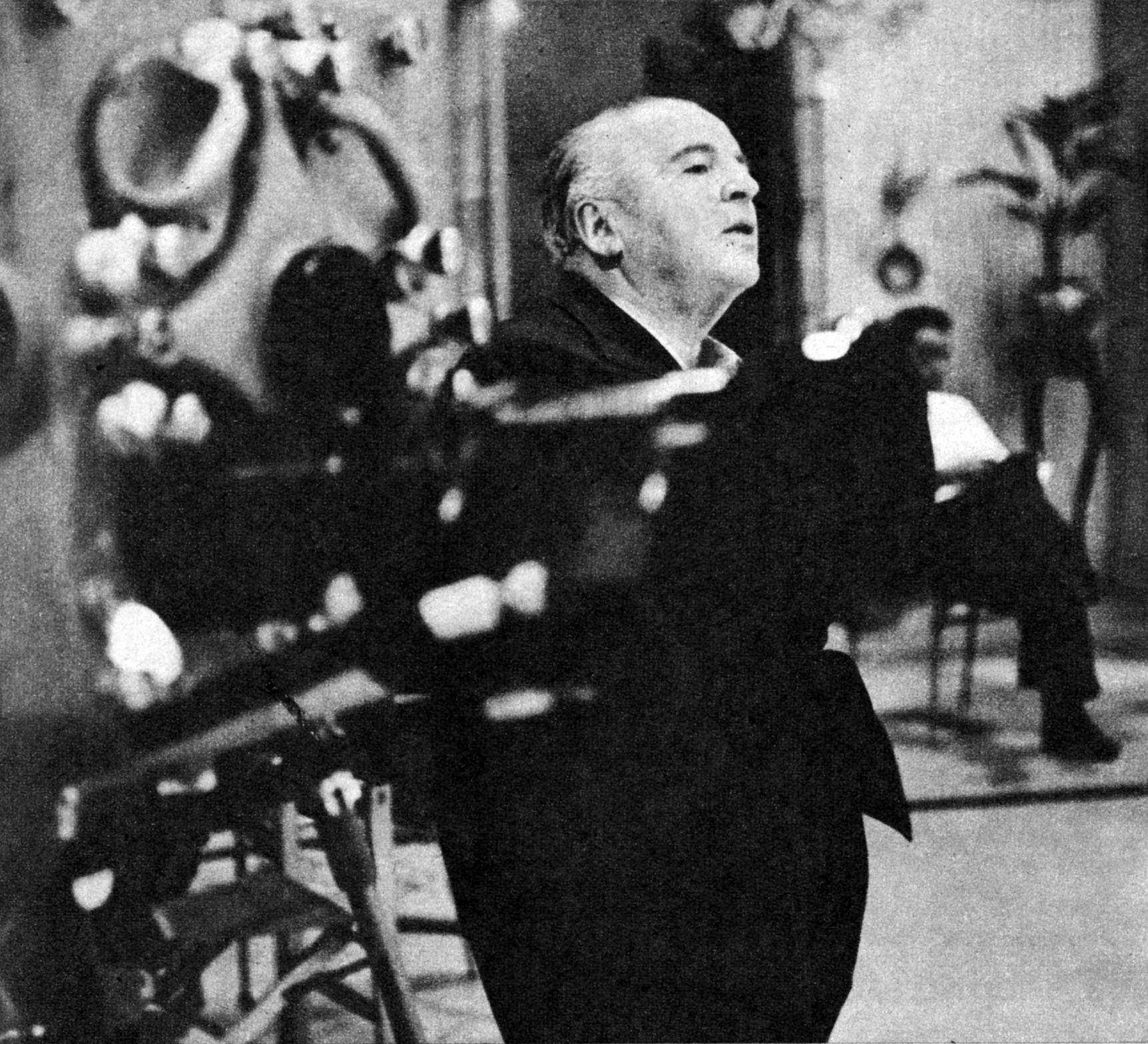
Mario Mattoli

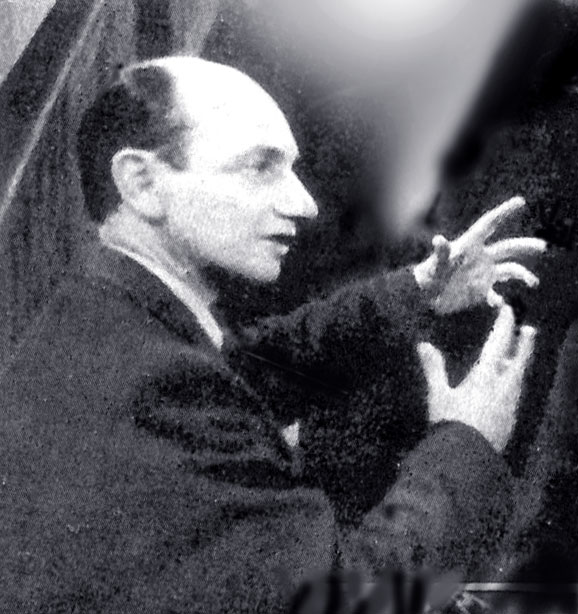
Carlo Ludovico Bragaglia

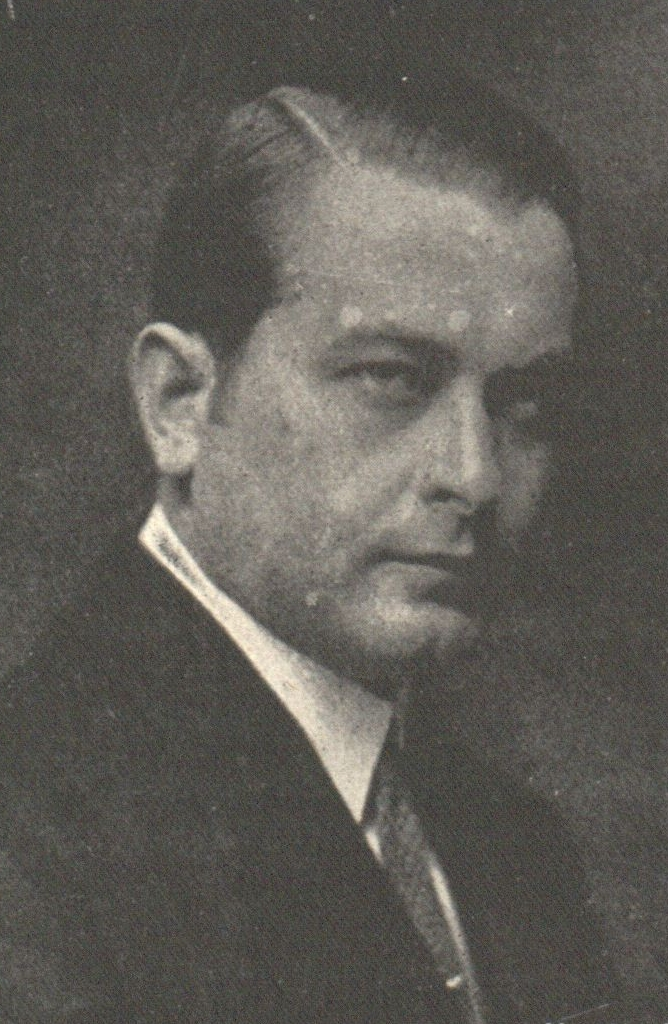
Max Neufeld

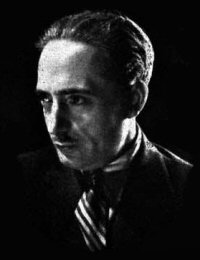
Gennaro Righelli

- The Private Secretary, by Goffredo Alessandrini (1931)
- The Charmer, by Guido Brignone (1931)
- Two Happy Hearts, by Baldassarre Negroni (1932)
- What Scoundrels Men Are!, by Mario Camerini (1932)
- One Night with You, by Ferruccio Biancini and Emmerich Wojtek Emo (1932)
- Paradise, by Guido Brignone (1932)
- Model Wanted, by Ferruccio Biancini and Emmerich Wojtek Emo (1933)
- Nini Falpala, by Amleto Palermi (1933)
- Paprika, by Carl Boese (1933)
- The Lucky Diamond, by Carl Boese (1933)
- I'll Give a Million, by Mario Camerini (1935)
- Adam's Tree, by Mario Bonnard (1936)
- White Amazons, by Gennaro Righelli (1936)
- But It's Nothing Serious, by Enrico Guazzoni (1936)
- King of Diamonds, by Enrico Guazzoni (1936)
- Sette giorni all'altro mondo, by Mario Mattoli (1936)
- Music in the Square, by Mario Mattoli (1936)
- The Man Who Smiles, by Mario Mattoli (1936)
- A Woman Between Two Worlds, by Goffredo Alessandrini (1936)
- I Don't Know You Anymore, by Nunzio Malasomma (1936)
- The Two Misanthropists, by Amleto Palermi (1937)
- The Make Believe Pirates, by Marco Elter (1937)
- The Ferocious Saladin, by Mario Bonnard (1937)
- The Three Wishes, by Giorgio Ferroni (1937)
- Felicita Colombo, by Mario Mattoli (1937)
- Hands Off Me!, by Gero Zambuto (1937)
- Il signor Max, by Mario Camerini (1937)
- The Castiglioni Brothers, by Corrado D'Errico (1937)
- These Children, by Mario Mattoli (1937)
- The Last Days of Pompeo, by Mario Mattoli (1937)
- The Carnival Is Here Again, by Raffaello Matarazzo (1937)
- The Countess of Parma, by regia di Alessandro Blasetti (1937)
- I've Lost My Husband!, by Enrico Guazzoni (1937)
- Tonight at Eleven, by Oreste Biancoli (1938)
- The Lady in White, by Mario Mattoli (1938)
- The Woman of Monte Carlo, by André Berthomieu and Mario Soldati (1938)
- The House of Shame, by Max Neufeld (1938)
- For Men Only, by Guido Brignone (1938)
- A Lady Did It, by Mario Mattoli (1938)
- Star of the Sea, by Corrado D'Errico (1938)
- I Want to Live with Letizia, by Camillo Mastrocinque (1938)
- They've Kidnapped a Man, by Gennaro Righelli (1938)
- A Thousand Lire a Month, by Max Neufeld (1939)
- At Your Orders, Madame, by Mario Mattoli (1939)
- We Were Seven Sisters, by Nunzio Malasomma (1939)
- Backstage, by Alessandro Blasetti (1939)
- Heartbeat, by Mario Camerini (1939)
- Unjustified Absence, by Max Neufeld (1939)
- The Castle Ball, by Max Neufeld (1939)
- Castles in the Air, by Augusto Genina (1939)
- We Were Seven Widows, by Mario Mattoli (1939)
- Department Store, by Mario Camerini (1939)
- Mille chilometri al minuto!, by Mario Mattoli (1939)
- Lo vedi come sei... lo vedi come sei?, by Mario Mattoli (1939)
- The Marquis of Ruvolito, by Raffaello Matarazzo (1939)
- Father for a Night, by Mario Bonnard (1939)
- Diamonds, by Corrado D'Errico (1939)
- A Wife in Danger, by Max Neufeld (1939)
- Mad Animals, by Carlo Ludovico Bragaglia (1939)
- La voce senza volto, by Gennaro Righelli (1939)
- The Night of Tricks, by Carlo Campogalliani (1939)
- The Document, by Mario Camerini (1939)
- Two Million for a Smile, by Carlo Borghesio (1939)
- One Hundred Thousand Dollars, by Mario Camerini (1940)
- Goodbye Youth, by Ferdinando Maria Poggioli (1940)
- Big Shoes, by Dino Falconi (1940)
- Una famiglia impossibile, by Carlo Ludovico Bragaglia (1940)
- Red Roses, by Giuseppe Amato and Vittorio De Sica (1940)
- Then We'll Get a Divorce, by Nunzio Malasomma (1940)
- Maddalena, Zero for Conduct, by Vittorio De Sica (1940)
- La zia smemorata, by Ladislao Vajda (1940)
- Red Tavern, by Max Neufeld (1940)
- Non me lo dire!, by Mario Mattoli (1940)
- The Happy Ghost, by Amleto Palermi (1941)
- The Brambilla Family Go on Holiday, by Carl Boese (1941)
- Lucky Night, by Raffaello Matarazzo (1941)
- Schoolgirl Diary, by Mario Mattoli (1941)
- Teresa Venerdì, by Vittorio De Sica (1941)
- A Husband for the Month of April, by Giorgio Simonelli (1941)
- The Adventuress from the Floor Above, by Raffaello Matarazzo (1941)
- The Last Dance, by Camillo Mastrocinque (1941)
- I Live as I Please, by Mario Mattoli (1942)
- The Queen of Navarre, by Carmine Gallone (1942)
- Wedding Day, by Raffaello Matarazzo (1942)
- La signorina, by László Kish (1942)
- Happy Days, by Carlo Ludovico Bragaglia (1942)
- C'è sempre un ma!, by Luigi Zampa (1942)
- Il birichino di papà, by Raffaello Matarazzo (1942)
- Music on the Run, by Carlo Ludovico Bragaglia (1943)
- Lively Teresa, by Mario Mattoli (1943)
- Without a Woman, by Alfredo Guarini (1943)
- Seven Years of Happiness, by Roberto Savarese (1943)
- Anything for a Song, by Mario Mattoli (1943)
- A Little Wife, by Giorgio Bianchi (1943)
- What a Distinguished Family, by Mario Bonnard (1945) (Note: Due to the events of 25 July 1943, the making of the film was interrupted or temporarily suspended. The film was only released in public cinemas at the end of 1945, after World War II ended.)

== See also ==
- Cinema of Italy
- Calligrafismo
- Italian neorealism

== Bibliography ==
- Bispuri, Ennio (2020). Il cinema dei telefoni bianchi [The cinema of white telephones] (in Italian). Bulzoni. ISBN 978-8868972127.
- Massimo, Mida (1980). Dai telefoni bianchi al neorealismo [From white telephones to neorealism] (in Italian). Laterza. ISBN 978-8842017219.
- Savio, Francesco (1975). Ma l'amore no: realismo, formalismo, propaganda e telefoni bianchi nel cinema italiano di regime 1930-1943 [But love, no: realism, formalism, propaganda and white telephones in the Italian cinema of the regime 1930-1943] (in Italian). Sonzogno.[ISBN unspecified]
