= Without a Flag =

- Directed by: Lionello De Felice
- Written by: Franco Brusati; Jacopo Comin; Lionello De Felice; Luigi Freddi; Giorgio Prosperi; Nantas Salvalaggio
- Produced by: Luigi Freddi
- Starring: Massimo Serato; Paolo Stoppa; Walter Rilla
- Cinematography: Mario Craveri
- Edited by: Mario Serandrei
- Music by: Renzo Rossellini
- Production company: Elfo Film
- Distributed by: ENIC
- Release date: October 1951
- Running time: 121 minutes
- Country: Italy
- Language: Italian

Without a Flag (Italian: Senza bandiera) is a 1951 Italian drama film directed by Lionello De Felice and starring Massimo Serato, Paolo Stoppa and Walter Rilla. It was shot at the Cinecittà Studios in Rome. The film's sets were designed by the art director Alfredo Montori.

== Synopsis ==
During the First World War, an Italian officer attempts to break up an Austrian espionage ring operating out of neutral Switzerland.

== Comment ==
De Felice's debut film Behind the Camera was shot in the Cinecittà studios. Registered in the Public Film Register with no. 980, was presented to the Film Review Commission on 21 September 1951, obtained censorship visa n. 10,616 of 2 October 1951, with the film length of 3,098 meters. It had its first public screening in October 1951. The collection was 141,500,000 lire.

== Main cast ==
- Vivi Gioi as Helga Grueber
- Massimo Serato as Leutnant Morassi
- Umberto Spadaro as Natale Papini - Lo scassinatore
- Paolo Stoppa as Poggi - Il professore
- Walter Rilla as Spionagechef
- Heinz Moog as Baron von Loetzendorff
- Carlo Ninchi as Il Comandante
- Guido Celano as Sottocapo Poggi
- Laura Solari as la signora Merrick
- Nietta Zocchi as la cameriera di Helda
- Camillo Pilotto as l'ispettore del controspionaggio
- Luigi Cimara as il diplomatico in Svizzera
- Guido Notari as l'ammiraglio
- Fanny Marchiò as una donna patronessa

== Bibliography ==
- Gianni Rondolino. Dizionario del cinema italiano 1945-1969. Einaudi, 1969.
