= A Husband for the Month of April =

1941 film

- Directed by: Giorgio Simonelli
- Written by: Mario Massa
- Produced by: Raffaele Colamonici
- Starring: Vanna Vanni; Carlo Romano; Pina Renzi
- Cinematography: Domenico Scala
- Edited by: Giorgio Simonelli
- Music by: Dan Caslar
- Production company: Juventus Film
- Distributed by: ENIC
- Release date: 9 March 1941
- Running time: 69 minutes
- Country: Italy
- Language: Italian

A Husband for the Month of April (Italian: Un marito per il mese di aprile) is a 1941 Italian "white-telephones" comedy film directed by Giorgio Simonelli and starring Vanna Vanni, Carlo Romano and Pina Renzi.

It was shot at the Cinecittà Studios in Rome. The film's sets were designed by the art director Alfredo Montori.

== Synopsis ==
To distance herself from a persistent suitor, a wealthy young woman hires a man to pose as her husband. Penniless due to his losses at gambling he agrees to take on the role for only the month of April.

== Cast ==
- Vanna Vanni as Mara
- Carlo Romano as Giovanni
- Pina Renzi as Signora Milton
- Guglielmo Sinaz as Signor Milton
- Romolo Costa as Marquess Enrico Poli di Torrebruciata
- Vera Carmi as The florist
- Fausto Guerzoni as Pietro, Marchess's butler
- Guido Morisi as José
- Renato Malavasi as The flower delivery boy
- Arturo Bragaglia as The tramp
- Vasco Creti as The train conductor
- Luigi Garrone as The Railway worker
- Alfredo Martinelli as The inn's doorman
- Alfredo Menichelli as The flower delivery boy
- Renzo Merusi as Giovanni's friend
- Nico Pepe as Giovanni's friend
- Marika Spada as The maid
- Dario Taron as Poker player

== Bibliography ==
- Brunetta, Gian Piero. The History of Italian Cinema: A Guide to Italian Film from Its Origins to the Twenty-first Century. Princeton University Press, 2009.
