= Boratto =

Boratto is a surname. Notable people with the surname include:

- Caterina Boratto (1915–2010), Italian film actress
- Gui Boratto (born 1974), Brazilian electronic music producer
