= Music on the Run =

- Directed by: Carlo Ludovico Bragaglia
- Written by: Carlo Ludovico Bragaglia; Aldo De Benedetti
- Starring: Gino Bechi; Irasema Dilián; Guglielmo Barnabò
- Cinematography: Rodolfo Lombardi
- Edited by: Gabriele Varriale
- Music by: Cesare A. Bixio
- Production companies: Juventus Film; Società Italiana Cines
- Distributed by: ENIC
- Release date: 23 February 1943
- Running time: 77 minutes
- Country: Italy
- Language: Italian

Music on the Run (Italian: Fuga a due voci) is a 1943 Italian "white-telephones" musical comedy film directed by Carlo Ludovico Bragaglia and starring Gino Bechi, Irasema Dilián and Guglielmo Barnabò.

The film's sets were designed by the art directors Alfredo Montori and Mario Rappini. It was shot at Cinecittà Studios.

== Cast ==
- Gino Bechi as Giulio Moris, a baritone
- Irasema Dilián as Maria Santelli
- Guglielmo Barnabò as Santelli, an industrialist and Maria's father
- Aroldo Tieri as Piero, Maria's beau
- Paolo Stoppa as Fogliatti, a producer
- Carlo Campanini as Count Matteo
- Gildo Bocci as Vagabond
- Gero Zambuto as Berelli, a director
- Tina Mannozzi as Rina, an actress
- Armando Migliari as Commissioner
- Vasco Creti as Train Conductor
- Paolo Ferrara as Inn Director
- Pina Gallini as Lady with the White Dog
- Enrico Luzi as First Screenwriter
- Polidor as Stationmaster
- Peppino Spadaro as Inn Waiter
- Franco Volpi as Second Screenwriter

== Bibliography ==
- Burke, Frank . A Companion to Italian Cinema. John Wiley & Sons, 2017.
