= Il signor Max =

Il Signor Max
- Theatrical release poster
- Directed by: Mario Camerini
- Written by: Amleto Palermi (story); Mario Camerini (screenplay)
- Produced by: C.O. Barbieri
- Starring: Vittorio De Sica
- Cinematography: Anchise Brizzi
- Edited by: Mario Camerini; Giovanna Del Bosco
- Music by: Renzo Rossellini
- Distributed by: Ente Nazionale Industrie Cinematografiche
- Release dates: 1937 (Italy); 5 October 1939 (U.S.)
- Running time: 84 minutes
- Country: Italy
- Language: Italian

Il Signor Max is a 1937 Italian "white-telephones" comedy film directed by Mario Camerini and starring Vittorio De Sica and Assia Noris.

== Plot ==
Gianni is a poor, young newspaper salesman in Rome. However, during his vacations he poses as Count Max Varaldo, an aristocrat. Once, on a cruise in Naples, he meets Donna Paola, a wealthy snob, and her maid Lauretta (a common, shy girl). After trying to establish a relationship with Donna Paola, Gianni, disappointed, decides to drop his alter ego Max and propose to Lauretta. However, she now believes that he is a Count. A series of humorous misunderstandings will happen before things get cleared.

== Cast ==
- Vittorio De Sica as Gianni/Max Varaldo
- Assia Noris as Lauretta
- Rubi Dalma as Donna Paola
- Umberto Melnati as Riccardo
- Lilia Dale as Pucci (billed as Adonella)
- Virgilio Riento as Pepe
- Mario Casaleggio as Uncle Pietro
- Caterina Collo as Aunt Lucia
- Ernesto Ghigi as Pierino
- Romolo Costa as Commandante Baldi
- Lilia Silvi as the orchard seller
- Giuseppe Pierozzi as a taxi driver
- Albino Principe as Bubi Bonci
- Clara Padoa as Jeanne, the athlete on the train
- Luciano Dorcoratto as the guide
- Desiderio Nobile as the major
- Armando Petroni as the pharmacist
- Edda Soligo as a girl at the ball
- Gianfranco Zanchi as the real Max Varaldo

== Bibliography ==
- Aprà, Adriano (1979). The Fabulous Thirties: Italian Cinema 1929-1944. Electa International Publishing Group.
