= Carlo Simoneschi =

Italian actor and director

- Born: 25 August 1878; Rome, Italy
- Died: 20 July 1955 (aged 76); Rome, Italy
- Occupations: Actor; film director
- Years active: 1912–1941
- Children: Lydia Simoneschi

Carlo Simoneschi (25 August 1878 – 20 July 1955) was an Italian stage and film actor. He also directed a number of films during the silent era.

== Selected filmography ==
- The Sack of Rome (1920)
- The Gift of the Morning (1932)
- Paradise (1932)
- Pergolesi (1932)
- Casta Diva (1935)
- Condottieri (1937)
- They've Kidnapped a Man (1938)
- Heartbeat (1939)
- Department Store (1939)
- Teresa Venerdì (1941)

== Bibliography ==
- Mitchell, Charles P. The Great Composers Portrayed on Film, 1913 through 2002. McFarland, 2004.
