= Anchise Brizzi =

Italian cinematographer

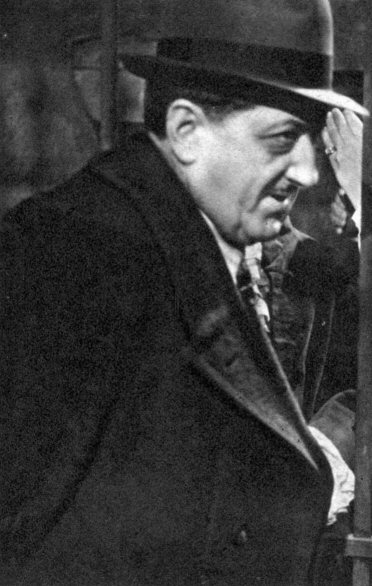
- Born: 5 October 1887; Poppi, Arezzo, Italy
- Died: 29 February 1964 (aged 76); Rome, Italy
- Years active: 1914–1963

Anchise Brizzi (5 October 1887 – 29 February 1964) was an Italian cinematographer.

== Life and career ==
Born in Poppi, Arezzo, Brizzi attended the regio istituto tecnico, specializing in optics and photography, then entered the cinema industry in the early 1910s. He won the best cinematography award at the 1948 Locarno International Film Festival for the film The Charterhouse of Parma directed by Christian-Jaque. He worked as cinematographer in more than 100 productions, including Vittorio De Sica's Shoeshine, Orson Welles' Othello, Alessandro Blasetti's 1860, Gregory Ratoff's Black Magic, Mario Camerini's Il signor Max.

== Selected filmography ==
- The Bread Peddler (1916)
- The Painting of Osvaldo Mars (1921)
- Maciste's American Nephew (1924)
- Pleasure Train (1924)
- Maciste against the Sheik (1926)
- Maciste in the Lion's Cage (1926)
- The Devil's Lantern (1931)
- Palio (1932)
- The Telephone Operator (1932)
- Tourist Train (1933)
- The Haller Case (1933)
- 1860 (1934)
- Port (1934)
- Loyalty of Love (1934)
- The Joker King (1935)
- The Phantom Gondola (1936)
- Lo squadrone bianco (1936)
- The Happy Road (1936)
- Beggar's Wedding (1936)
- Il signor Max (1937)
- The Two Misanthropists (1937)
- Naples of Olden Times (1938)
- The Two Mothers (1938)
- Dora Nelson (1939)
- Naples Will Never Die (1939)
- The Dream of Butterfly (1939)
- Heartbeat (1939)
- Department Store (1939)
- Beyond Love (1940)
- Love Me, Alfredo! (1940)
- Eternal Melodies (1940)
- Two on a Vacation (1940)
- The Betrothed (1941)
- The Two Orphans (1942)
- Sealed Lips (1942)
- Odessa in Flames (1942)
- The Three Pilots (1942)
- Invisible Chains (1942)
- Harlem (1943)
- Sad Loves (1943)
- Maria Malibran (1943)
- Shoeshine (1946)
- Biraghin (1946)
- Before Him All Rome Trembled (1946)
- The Lovers (1946)
- The Charterhouse of Parma (1948)
- Crossroads of Passion (1948)
- Black Magic (1949)
- The Pirates of Capri (1949)
- The Thief of Venice (1950)
- Love and Blood (1951)
- Last Meeting (1951)
- Shadows Over Naples (1951)
- Messalina (1951)
- Othello (1951)
- Article 519, Penal Code (1952)
- The Woman Who Invented Love (1952)
- Hello Elephant (1952)
- The Return of Don Camillo (1953)
- For You I Have Sinned (1953)
- The Two Orphans (1954)
- The Lovers of Manon Lescaut (1954)
- Il conte Aquila (1955)
- Don Camillo's Last Round (1955)
- Io piaccio (1955)
- Peccato di castità (1956)
- Peppino, le modelle e chella là (1957)
- Toto, Peppino and the Fanatics (1958)
- Cleopatra's Daughter (1960)
