= I've Lost My Husband! =

1937 film

- Directed by: Enrico Guazzoni
- Written by: Gian Gaspare Napolitano
- Based on: I've Lost My Husband! by Giovanni Cenzato
- Produced by: Cariddi Oreste Barbieri
- Starring: Paola Borboni; Nino Besozzi; Enrico Viarisio; Romolo Costa
- Cinematography: Massimo Terzano
- Edited by: Gino Talamo
- Music by: Amedeo Escobar
- Production company: Astra Film
- Distributed by: ENIC
- Release date: 31 March 1937
- Running time: 75 minutes
- Country: Italy
- Language: Italian

I've Lost My Husband! (Italian: Ho perduto mio marito) is a 1937 Italian "white-telephones" romantic comedy film directed by Enrico Guazzoni and starring Paola Borboni, Nino Besozzi and Enrico Viarisio. It was based a play of the same title by Giovanni Cenzato.

It was shot at the Cines Studios in Rome and on location in Valdagno in Northern Italy. The film's sets were designed by the art director Giorgio Pinzauti.

== Plot ==
Valentina is in love with her friend Giuliano and wants him to marry her. In order for them to spend time together she tricks him into believing that she had recently married and lost her husband at the railway station. She persuades Giuliano to assist her in an extensive search for the missing husband, by the end of which he has fallen in love with her.

== Cast ==
- Paola Borboni as Valentina
- Nino Besozzi as Conte Giuliano Arenzi
- Enrico Viarisio as Mattia
- Romolo Costa as Ing. Zanni
- Nicola Maldacea as Giuseppe
- Vittorina Benvenuti as Signorina Adele
- Vanna Vanni as Cecilia - sua figlia

== See also ==
Nugent, Frank S. (20 October 1939). "Movie Review: At the Cinecitta". New York Times.

== Bibliography ==
- Clarke, David B. & Doel, Marcus A. Moving Pictures/Stopping Places: Hotels and Motels on Film. Lexington Books, 2009.
