= Red Tavern =

1940 film directed by Max Neufeld

- Directed by: Max Neufeld
- Written by: Aldo De Benedetti; Gherardo Gherardi
- Starring: Alida Valli; André Mattoni; Lauro Gazzolo; Oreste Bilancia
- Cinematography: Alberto Fusi
- Edited by: Giuseppe Fatigati
- Music by: Armando Fragna
- Production company: Italcine
- Distributed by: ICI
- Release date: 8 February 1940
- Running time: 80 minutes
- Country: Italy
- Language: Italian

Red Tavern (Italian: Taverna rossa) is a 1940 Italian "white-telephones" comedy film directed by Max Neufeld and starring Alida Valli, André Mattoni, and Lauro Gazzolo. It was made at Cinecittà in Rome. A young woman eventually marries a count after a series of misunderstandings.

== Cast ==
- Alida Valli as Susanna Sormani
- André Mattoni as Il conte Carlo Torresi
- Lauro Gazzolo as Il marchese Domenico Torresi, suo zio
- Oreste Bilancia as Il signor Sormanni
- Lilia Dale as Ninon
- Umberto Sacripante as Il ladruncolo
- Aristide Garbini as Cesarone, il maggiordomo
- Luigi Erminio D'Olivo as Il tenore Farelli
- Anna Doré as Floriana
- Livia Minelli as La commesa del negozio di dischi
- Alfredo Martinelli as Un cliente del negozio di dischi
- Rita Durnova as Lisetta
- Paola Doria as Francesca
- Ernesto Torrini as Il cameriere del locale
- Armida Bonocore as Maria

== Bibliography ==
- Gundle, Stephen. Mussolini's Dream Factory: Film Stardom in Fascist Italy. Berghahn Books, 2013.
