= Cesare Andrea Bixio =

Italian composer (1896–1978)

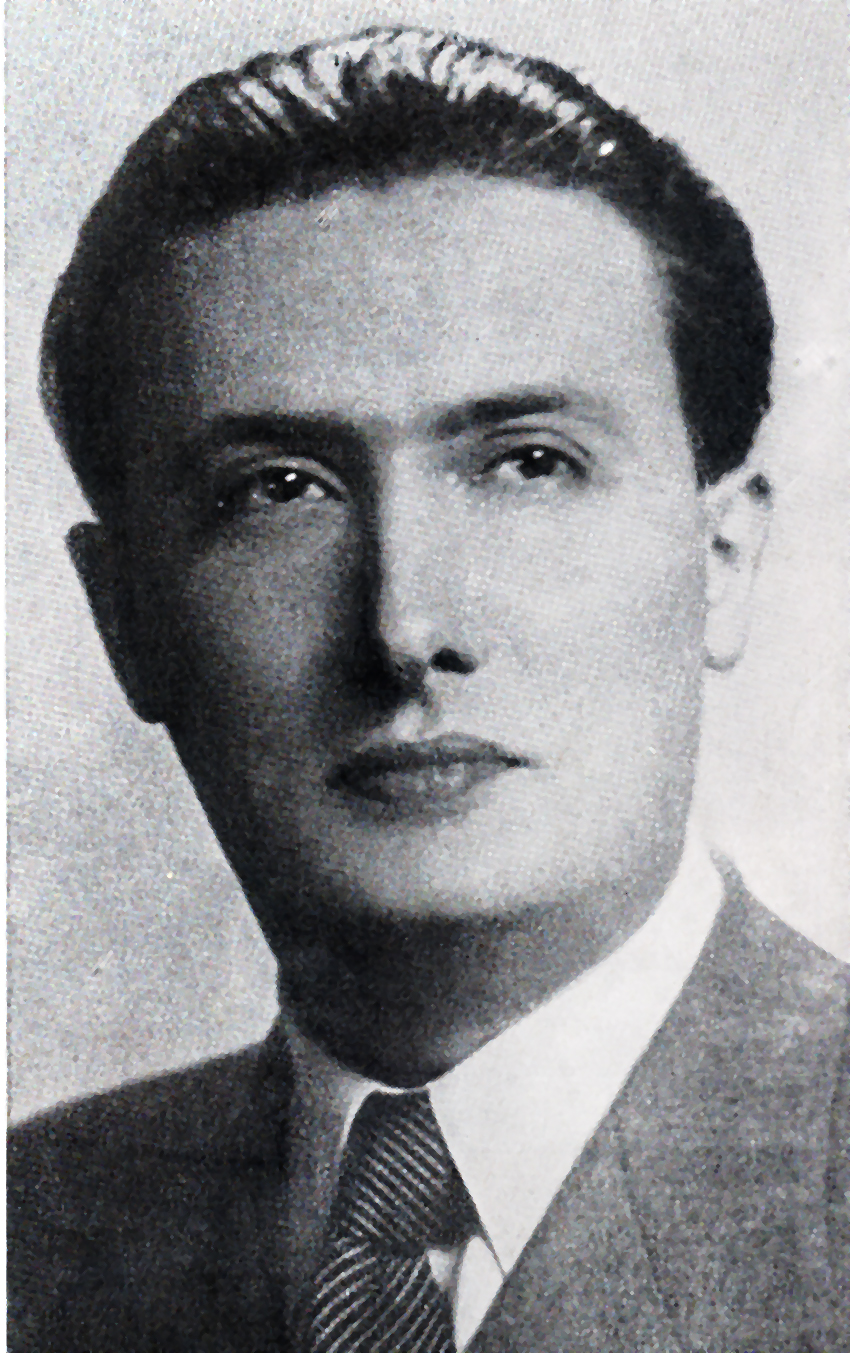

Cesare Andrea Bixio (11 October 1896 – 5 March 1978) was an Italian composer.

He was one of the most popular Italian songwriters of the 1930s, 1940s, and 1950s.

Bixio was born in Naples, Italy. His hits included Vivere; Mamma; Parlami d'amore, Mariù; La mia canzone al vento, and many others. The lyricist for many of his hits was Bixio Cherubini.

Famous singers who performed Bixio's songs included Beniamino Gigli, Tito Schipa, Carlo Buti, Giuseppe Di Stefano, and Luciano Pavarotti.

He died in Rome in 1978, aged 81.

== Selected filmography ==
- What Scoundrels Men Are! (1932)
- The Haller Case (1933)
- Port (1934)
- Loyalty of Love (1934)
- The Phantom Gondola (1936)
- The Amnesiac (1936)
- It Was I! (1937)
- Abandon All Hope (1937)
- To Live (1937)
- Mother Song (1937)
- They've Kidnapped a Man (1938)
- The House of Shame (1938)
- Unjustified Absence (1939)
- Heartbeat (1939)
- Who Are You? (1939)
- In the Country Fell a Star (1939)
- The Faceless Voice (1939)
- Department Store (1939)
- The Knight of San Marco (1939)
- Then We'll Get a Divorce (1940)
- Music on the Run (1943)
- Romulus and the Sabines (1945)
- Eleven Men and a Ball (1948)
- Tragic Serenade (1951)
- Listen To My Song (1959)
