= La signorina =

1942 film

- Directed by: László Kish
- Written by: Guido Cantini; Alessandro De Stefani
- Starring: Loredana; Nino Besozzi
- Cinematography: Giorgio Orsini
- Music by: Giovanni Militello
- Release date: 1942
- Language: Italian

La signorina (i.e. "The young lady") is a 1942 Italian "white-telephones" romantic drama film directed by László Kish and starring Loredana and Nino Besozzi. It is based on a novel by Gerolamo Rovetta.

== Plot ==
The young daughter of a libertine is placed in the care of a novelist, who agrees to be her father. The novelist also finds a boy suitable for her as a husband but later discovers that he is his woman's lover. Despite these and other twists, the happy ending sees love blossom between the pupil and his guardian.

== Cast ==
- Loredana as Lulù
- Nino Besozzi as Francesco Roero
- Laura Nucci as Fani
- Alberto Sordi as Nino
- Paolo Stoppa as Fani's lover
- Leda Gloria
- Maria Jacobini
- Giacomo Moschini
- Giovanni Varni
- Nino Marchesini
- Lydia Johnson
- Liana Del Balzo

== See also ==
- List of Italian films of 1942
