= Edda Soligo =

Italian actress

- Born: 17 July 1905; Florence, Tuscany, Italy
- Died: 2 March 1984 (aged 78); Rome, Lazio, Italy
- Occupation: Actress
- Years active: 1934–1984 (film & TV)

Edda Soligo (17 July 1905 – 2 March 1984) was an Italian film and television actress.

== Selected filmography ==
- Adam's Tree (1936)
- The Man from Nowhere (1937)
- The Former Mattia Pascal (1937)
- Il signor Max (1937)
- To Live (1937)
- Tonight at Eleven (1938)
- A Romantic Adventure (1940)
- Lucky Night (1941)
- The Secret Lover (1941)
- The King's Jester (1941)
- Torrents of Spring (1942)
- The Two Orphans (1942)
- Lively Teresa (1943)
- No Turning Back (1945)
- Peddlin' in Society (1946)
- Night Taxi (1950)
- La figlia del diavolo (1952)
- Naples Sings (1953)
- Storms (1953)
- Frine, Courtesan of Orient (1953)
- The Most Wonderful Moment (1957)
- The Law (1959)
- Girl with a Suitcase (1961)

== Bibliography ==
- Verdone, Luca. I film di Alessandro Blasetti. Gremese Editore, 1989.
