= Laura Nucci =

Italian film actress (1913–1994)

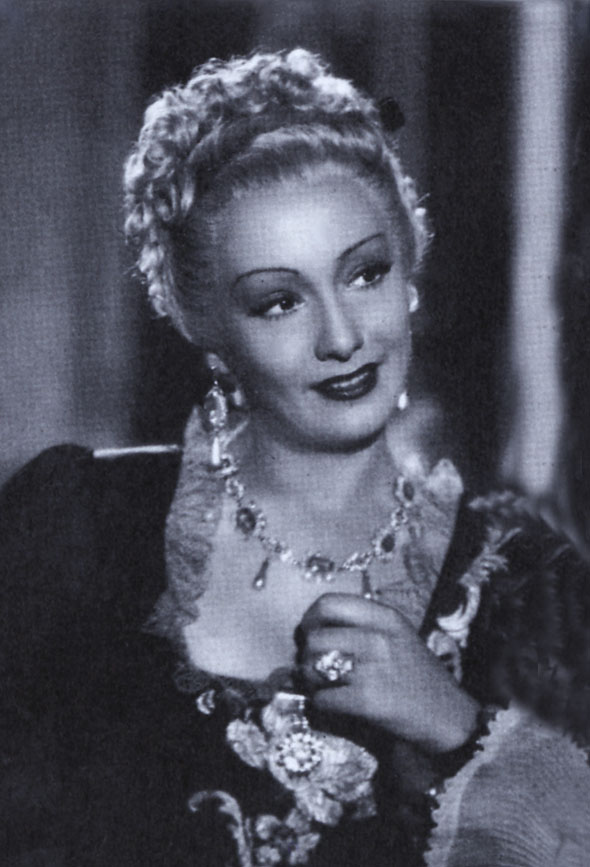
- Nucci in 1941
- Born: 26 February 1913; Carrara, Kingdom of Italy
- Died: 30 January 1994 (aged 80); Rome, Italy
- Other name: Maria Laura Lodovici
- Occupation: Actress
- Years active: 1930–1989

Laura Nucci (26 February 1913 – 30 January 1994) was an Italian film actress. Nucci was one of the stars of the Fascist era, emerging after she won a competition. Her career was setback by the downfall of Benito Mussolini's regime, but from 1950 she began appearing in films again as a character actress. She also appeared in television, such as the 1957 series Pride and Prejudice.

== Selected filmography ==
- La Leggenda di Wally (1930)
- Palio (1932)
- Bad Subject (1933)
- Dimmed Lights (1934)
- Golden Arrow (1935)
- The Dance of Time (1936)
- Condottieri (1937)
- We Were Seven Widows (1939)
- The Faceless Voice (1939)
- Diamonds (1939)
- The Knight of San Marco (1939)
- La signorina (1942)
- The Adventures of Fra Diavolo (1942)
- Rita of Cascia (1943)
- Disowned (1954)
- Call Girls of Rome (1960)
- The Lovely Lola (1962)
- Devil of the Desert Against the Son of Hercules (1964)
- We Still Kill the Old Way (1967)
- The Bloodstained Shadow (1978)
- Killer Nun (1978)
- Blow to the Heart (1982)
- Warrior of the Lost World (1983)
