= Nietta Zocchi =

Italian actress (1909–1981)

- Born: 10 July 1909; Rivoli, Kingdom of Italy
- Died: 23 April 1981 (aged 71); Rome, Italy
- Occupation: Actress
- Years active: 1936–1976

Nietta Zocchi (10 July 1909 – 23 April 1981) was an Italian film actress. She appeared in 70 films between 1936 and 1976.

== Selected filmography ==
- The Amnesiac (1936) - Zelinda (uncredited)
- To Live (1936) - Una spettatrice al concerto
- Sette giorni all'altro mondo (1936) - Nurse
- The Dance of Time (1936)
- The Anonymous Roylott (1936)
- But It's Nothing Serious (1937)
- Adam's Tree (1938) - Infermiera Ersilia
- Il suo destino (1938) - Una reclusa
- The Faceless Voice (1939) - La cameriera della primattrice
- Heartbeat (1939) - Un' altra ragazza disoccupata
- The Widow (1939) - Un'invitata alla festa
- Department Store (1939) - La commessa racchia (uncredited)
- Mamma (1941) - La cameriera dell'albergo a Venezia
- Orizzonte dipinto (1941) - Blandina
- Il re del circo (1941) - La signora Speranza
- Villa da vendere (1941) - Gabriella
- A Woman Has Fallen (1941) - Una cliente della casa di mode
- La scuola dei timidi (1941) - La segretaria di Roc
- The Jester's Supper (1942) - Cinzia
- After Casanova's Fashion (1942) - Donna Rosalia
- Gli assi della risata (1943) - NZ (segment "Il mio pallone")
- Il fiore sotto gli occhi (1954) - La cameriera degli Aroca
- The Transporter (1950) - Una cliente di La Motta
- Accidents to the Taxes!! (1951)
- Without a Flag (1951) - Insegnante di francese
- The Adventures of Mandrin (1952)
- The Dream of Zorro (1952) - Dona Hermosa Alcazan
- The Eternal Chain (1952) - The 'Alhambra' Owner
- Wife for a Night (1952) - Yvonne
- Il romanzo della mia vita (1952) - Maria De Marchis' Aunt (uncredited)
- Cani e gatti (1952)
- Too Young for Love (1953)
- Bread, Love and Dreams (1953) - Una comare intrigante (uncredited)
- My Life Is Yours (1953)
- 100 Years of Love (1954) - Nunziata (segment "Garibaldina")
- Cose da pazzi (1954) - Madwoman playing canasta
- Romeo and Juliet (1954) - Lady Montague
- Cento serenate (1954)
- Alvaro piuttosto corsaro (1954)
- Chéri-Bibi (1955) - La governante
- La ladra (1955) - Signora della orfania (uncredited)
- The Letters Page (1955) - Pipinuccio Gigliozzi's Wife
- Io sono la Primula Rossa (1955) - Lady Margareth
- Desperate Farewell (1955) - Professor Farri's Secretary
- Rigoletto e la sua tragedia (1956) - Giovanna
- Wives and Obscurities (1956) - Signora Tumedei
- The Sword and the Cross (1956)
- Donne, amore e matrimoni (1956) - Moglie del colonnello
- Cantando sotto le stelle (1956) - Signora Diotallevi
- Vivendo cantando... che male ti fò? (1957) - La direttrice dell'istituto
- Mattino di primavera (1957)
- Il Conte di Matera (1958) - Governante di Greta
- Via col para... vento (1958)
- First Love (1959) - Teresa (uncredited)
- Sunset in Naples (1959)
- The Son of the Red Corsair (1959) - Isabella
- Quel tesoro di papà (1959) - Franco de Licori's Mother
- La duchessa di Santa Lucia (1959)
- La Pica sul Pacifico (1959) - The Lady launching the boat
- Il raccomandato di ferro (1959)
- Tipi da spiaggia (1959) - Eva - Barbara's acquaintance (uncredited)
- Le pillole di Ercole (1960) - La signora violentata
- Mariti in pericolo (1960) - Madre di Elena
- Ferragosto in bikini (1960) - La signora Porro
- Romulus and the Sabines (1961) - Ersilia, Titus' Wife
- Rocco e le sorelle (1961)
- I magnifici tre (1961) - Nina
- La donna degli altri è sempre più bella (1963) - La madre di Savina (segment "Bagnino Lover")
- I figli del leopardo (1965)
- Veneri al sole (1965) - La madre di Concettina (segment "Una domenica a Fregene")
- Spiaggia libera (1966) - La Contessa
- Ghosts – Italian Style (1967)
- Incensurato, provata disonestà, carriera assicurata, cercasi (1972)
- Il secondo tragico Fantozzi (1976) - Contessa Serbelloni Mazzanti Viendalmare
