= Vanna Vanni =

Italian actress (1915–1998)

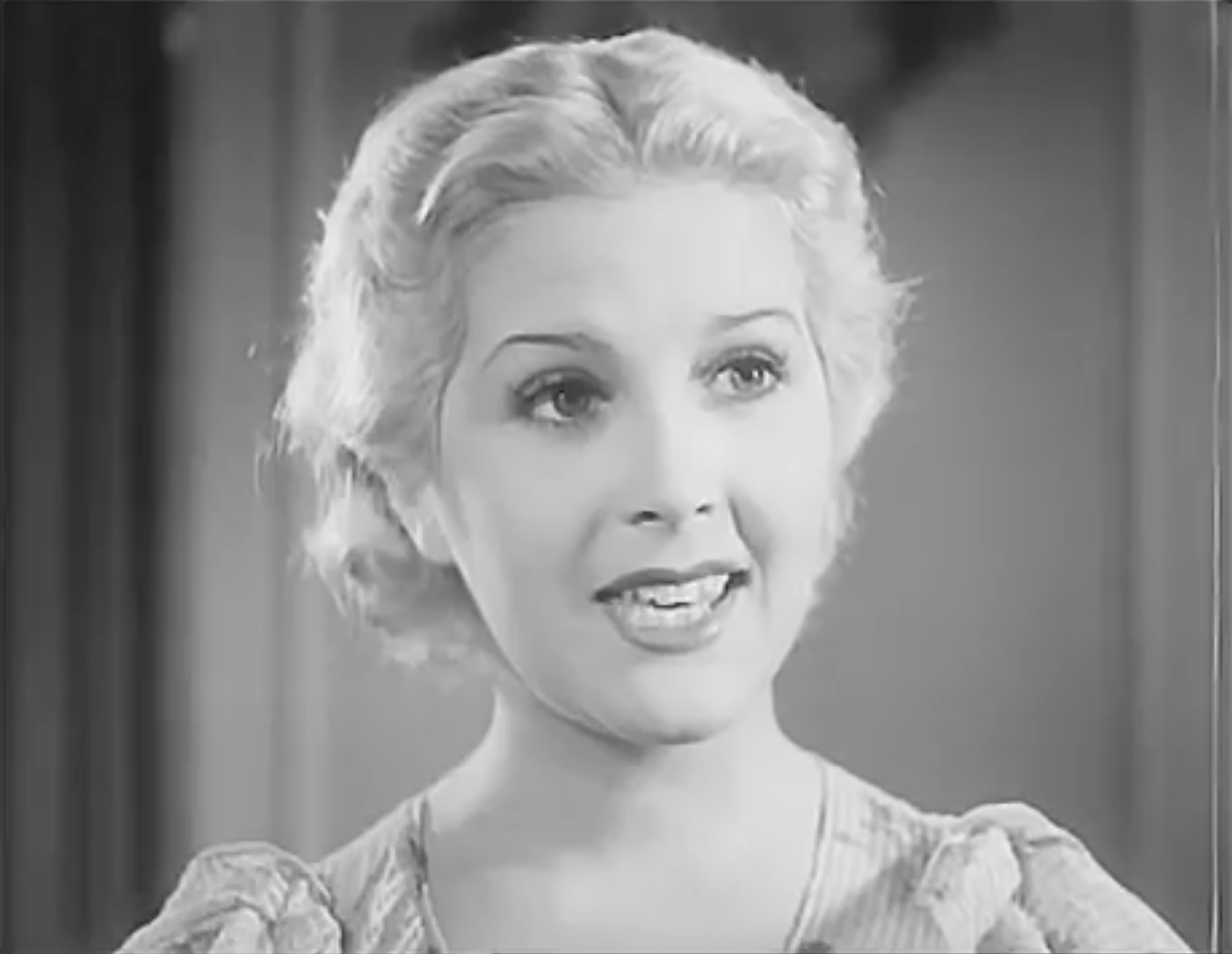
- Vanni in I Don't Know You Anymore (1936)
- Born: Maria Angelica Giovanna Pegna; 7 January 1915; Florence, Italy
- Died: 6 March 1998 (aged 83); Rome, Lazio, Italy
- Other name: Vanna Pegna
- Occupation: Actress
- Years active: 1930–1943

Vanna Vanni (7 January 1915 – 6 March 1998) was an Italian film actress. She was in thirty-one films between 1930 and 1943.

== Life and career ==
Vanni was born in Florence as Maria Angelica Giovanna Pegna. She has been described as a graceful and elegant brunette, and the New York Times film critic, Frank Nugent, wrote in a review of I've Lost My Husband! that she was "one of the prettiest girls in the Italian film industry."

Her first cinematic role was in Perché no? (1930), directed by Amleto Palermi, and in her first films she was credited as Vanna Pegna. Vanni was one of the most prolific actresses in Italian cinema between mid-1930s and 1940s; specialized in comedy films, she got some critical acclaim for her dramatic turn in Esodo Pratelli's Se non son matti non li vogliamo. She also worked with directors such as Raffaello Matarazzo, Gennaro Righelli, Giorgio Simonelli, and Eduardo De Filippo.

She retired from film in 1943 and died in Rome in 1998.

== Selected filmography ==
- Perché no? (1930) (as Vanna Pegna)
- The Doctor's Secret (1931) (as Vanna Pegna)
- Il serpente a sonagli (1935) (as Vanna Pegna)
- Golden Arrow (1935)
- La gondola delle chimere (1936)
- Sette giorni all'altro mondo (1936)
- I Don't Know You Anymore (1936)
- L'uomo che sorride (1936)
- King of Diamonds (1936)
- I fratelli Castiglioni (1937)
- I've Lost My Husband! (1937)
- The Boarders at Saint-Cyr (1939)
- The Knight of San Marco (1939)
- The Faceless Voice (1939)
- L'imprevisto (1940)
- A Husband for the Month of April (1941)
- Se non son matti non li vogliamo (1941)
- Torrents of Spring (1942)
- Non ti pago! (1942)
- 4 ragazze sognano (1943)
- Non mi muovo! (1943)
- Ti conosco, mascherina! (1943)
