= Guglielmo Barnabò =

Italian actor (1888–1954)

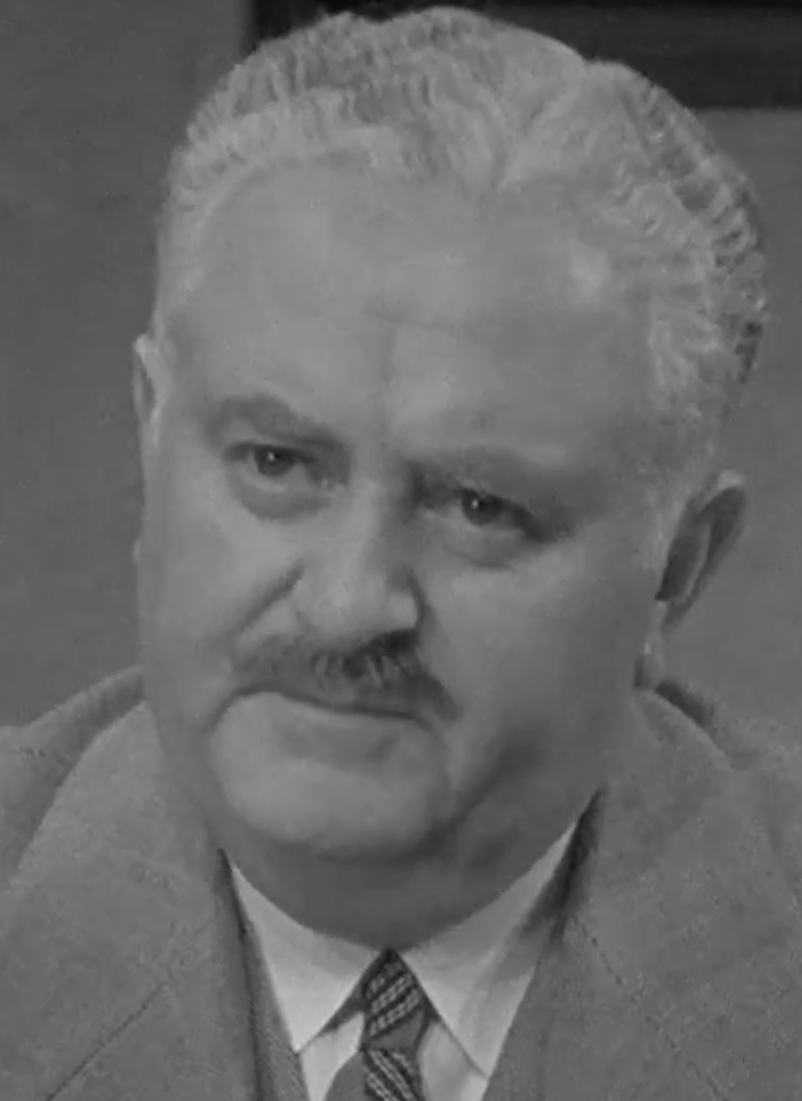
- Barnabò in the movie The Man on the Street (1941)
- Born: 11 May 1888; Ancona, Kingdom of Italy
- Died: 31 May 1954 (aged 66); Ancona, Italy
- Occupation: Actor
- Years active: 1926–1954

Guglielmo Barnabò (11 May 1888 – 31 May 1954) was an Italian stage and film actor. He appeared in more than 90 films between 1926 and 1954.

== Life and career ==
Born in Ancona, Barnabò made his stage debut in 1921 at the Greek Theatre of Syracuse, with the Annibale Ninchi's company. Since then he was enrolled by some of the most important stage companies of his time, working among others with Marta Abba, Alda Borelli, Maria Melato, Gino Cervi, Paolo Stoppa.

In 1927 Barnabò made his screen debut in the silent film Beauty of the World, but his film career took off with the sound cinema, when he became one of the most active character actors of the 1930s and the 1940s. Specialized in good-natured and bourgeois character roles, he is best known as the villain capitalist in Vittorio De Sica's Miracle in Milan.

Barnabò was married to actress Vittorina Benvenuti, with whom he often worked in films and on stage.

== Selected filmography ==
- Beauty of the World (1927)
- The Last Adventure (1932) - Don Luigi - il prete
- Bad Subject (1933) - Father of Willy and Susanna
- Red Passport (1935) - Mr. Johnson
- The Ancestor (1936)
- To Live (1936) - Il presidente del consorzio
- Sette giorni all'altro mondo (1936) - A patient
- Un bacio a fior d'acqua (1936) - Il commendatore
- Scipio Africanus: The Defeat of Hannibal (1937) - Furius, fat Roman
- Marcella (1937)
- Gli uomini non sono ingrati (1937) - Istvan Vojda
- I due barbieri (1937)
- I Want to Live with Letizia (1938) - Il signor Barozzi
- Giuseppe Verdi (1938) - Il gondoliere
- The Cuckoo Clock (1938) - Il sergente MacNeill
- Inventiamo l'amore (1938) - Tonino Biancardi
- Heartbeat (1939) - Un detectivo dell'albergo 'Majestic'
- Marionette (1939) - Un contadino
- We Were Seven Sisters (1939) - Il barone Franzetti
- Fascino (1939)
- Le sorprese del divorzio (1939) - Alberto, il cameriere di Champeaux
- A Wife in Danger (1939) - Luigi Arnold
- Guest for One Night (1939) - Alberto de Meral
- The Dream of Butterfly (1939)
- Unjustified Absence (1939) - Il signor Fabbri
- Cose dell'altro mondo (1939) - Dick, il capo carceriere
- Lo vedi come sei... Lo vedi come sei? (1939) - Zio Sofia (uncredited)
- Manon Lescaut (1940) - Il governatore di New Orleans
- Validità giorni dieci (1940) - Il signore Goven
- The First Woman Who Passes (1940) - Il console d'Auvray
- Non me lo dire! (1940) - L'organizzatore dei giocchi di società
- Maddalena, Zero for Conduct (1940) - Signor Emilio Lenci
- Marco Visconti (1941) - Oldrado Del Balzo
- Il pozzo dei miracoli (1941) - Filippo Farkas
- Scampolo (1941) - Fallotti
- The Man on the Street (1941) - L'industriale Sebastiano Corsi
- Il cavaliere senza nome (1941) - Il marchese Serra, padre di Isabella
- Teresa Venerdì (1941) - Agostino Passalacqua
- Cenerentola e il signor Bonaventura (1941) - Il re [The King]
- Non mi sposo più (1942) - Il maggiordomo
- Se io fossi onesto (1942) - Il barone Demetrio Vareghi
- C'è un fantasma nel castello (1942) - Il barone Sanguignoni
- Document Z-3 (1942) - Kavelic, capo del servizio segreto jugoslavo
- Soltanto un bacio (1942) - Il commendator d'Anzi
- I sette peccati (1942) - L'editore Sturmer, padre di Isa
- La morte civile (1942) - Il profesore Rinaldi
- Don Giovanni (1942) - Don Pablo
- Wedding Day (1942) - (deleted scenes)
- L'affare si complica (1942)
- La fanciulla dell'altra riva (1942) - Il banchiere Ritter
- Charley's Aunt (1943) - Il colonnello
- Music on the Run (1943) - L'industriale Santelli - suo padre
- Redemption (1943)
- Short Circuit (1943) - Il gionalista Saverio Funk
- La danza del fuoco (1943) - Il barone d'Avita
- The Peddler and the Lady (1943) - Il signore grasso sul treno (uncredited)
- Non sono superstizioso... ma! (1943) - Il padre di Rosetta
- Senza una donna (1943) - Adalgiso Barni Vagnoli
- I nostri sogni (1943) - Posci - Il direttore dei 'Magazini Tuns'
- Il fidanzato di mia moglie (1943) - Guglielmo Sarti
- In cerca di felicità (1944) - Giacomo Libretti
- Il fiore sotto gli occhi (1944) - Il preside
- The Devil Goes to Boarding School (1944) - Il giudice Testones
- Quartetto pazzo (1945) - Alberto, il maggiordomo
- What a Distinguished Family (1945) - Boris Montischi
- Come Back to Sorrento (1945) - Avvocato Vannini
- Pronto chi parla? (1946) - Zio Ottavio
- Canto, ma sottovoce... (1946) - Annibale Lantieri
- Biraghin (1946)
- L'apocalisse (1947)
- The Two Orphans (1947) - Il giudice
- L'isola del sogno (1947) - Industriale Orazio Fuller
- Cab Number 13 (1948)
- Veglia nella notte (1948)
- Mad About Opera (1948) - Il direttore del Covent Garden
- Be Seeing You, Father (1948) - Generale Beauville
- Guarany (1948)
- Fabiola (1949) - Antoniano Leto
- Adam and Eve (1949) - Joe
- Ricchi e povere (1949)
- The Last Days of Pompeii (1950) - Panza
- Figaro Here, Figaro There (1950) - Don Bartolo, il governatore
- Totò Tarzan (1950) - Geronimo
- Atoll K (1950) - Le propriétaire de la palissade
- Miracle in Milan (1951) - Mobbi
- Arrivano i nostri (1951) - Pallatino, l'agente teatrale
- Briscola (1951)
- Verginità (1951) - Impresario
- Accidents to the Taxes!! (1951) - Il gran khan
- The Ungrateful Heart (1951) - Impresario teatrale
- Amor non ho... però... però (1951) - Signore con la bombetta
- The Two Sergeants (1951)
- Ha fatto tredici (1951) - Comm. Mario Rossi
- Ergastolo (1952) - The Manager of the hotel
- Mademoiselle Gobete (1952) - Il direttore dell'albergo
- Don Lorenzo (1952)
- Sunday Heroes (1952) - The President of the football club
- I, Hamlet (1952)
- Poppy (1952) - Medico
- It's Never Too Late (1953)
- The Most Wanted Man (1953) - M Click
- Pane, Amore e Fantasia (1953) - Il sindaco
- Tudo Acaba em Casamento (1954) - Il dottor Stefan Stefanovich Chubukov
- Great Vaudeville (1954) - l'avvocato (episodio 'Fregoli')
- Neapolitan Carousel (1954) - German tourist
