= Naples Sings =

1953 film by Armando Grottini

- Film poster
- Directed by: Armando Grottini
- Written by: Antonio Ferrigno; Rodolfo Morelli
- Produced by: Antonio Ferrigno
- Starring: Virna Lisi
- Cinematography: Sergio Pesce
- Edited by: Jolanda Benvenuti
- Music by: Giuseppe Cioffi; Vittorio Mascheroni
- Production company: Aurora Film
- Distributed by: Indipendenti Regionali
- Release date: 28 December 1953
- Running time: 90 minutes
- Country: Italy
- Language: Italian

Naples Sings (Italian: ...e Napoli canta!) is a 1953 Italian musical melodrama film directed by Armando Grottini, starring Virna Lisi.

The film's sets were designed by Alfredo Montori.

== Plot ==
1935: a rich nobleman, in order not to compromise the marriage of his daughter to an English nobleman, takes her newborn daughter from her (had from a clandestine affair), entrusting her to nuns with a medal of the Madonna around her neck.

1953: Giorgio with some friends is rehearsing a show of Neapolitan songs financed thanks to an elderly artist. Having quarrelled with his landlady, Giorgio rented a room with a good woman who lives with her beautiful daughter Maria. Love soon arises between the two. When, thanks to a farsighted entrepreneur, things are going for the best, Maria's mother is summoned by the nuns: a woman has finally learned the truth about her daughter who was stolen from her 18 years earlier and entrusted to the nuns: now she claims his own daughter, that is, Maria. The girl moves to her birth mother and, attending parties and attending nobles, she becomes engaged to a young scion but never forgetting her Giorgio with whom she secretly meets. In the meantime, the show of these is a great success, but Giorgio has lost all enthusiasm: Maria is getting married. But right at the altar, under the eyes of the two mothers, Maria finds the courage to say no, and to rejoin Giorgio.

== Cast ==
- Giacomo Rondinella as Giorgio Sabelli
- Virna Lisi as Maria
- Germana Paolieri as Countess Mariani
- Pina Piovani as the adoptive mother of Maria
- Tina Pica
- Beniamino Maggio
- Tecla Scarano
- Guglielmo Inglese
- Edda Soligo
- Dina Perbellini
- Cristina Grado
- Carlo Giuffrè
- Giannina Chiantoni
- Vittorio André
- Carla Boni
- Mario Abbate
- Antonio La Raina
- Franca Gandolfi
- Adriana Facchetti
- Gabriele Vanosio
- Aldo Cantoni
