= Bad Subject =

1933 film

- Directed by: Carlo Ludovico Bragaglia
- Written by: Carlo Ludovico Bragaglia; Frederick Lonsdale; Fulvio Palmieri
- Starring: Vittorio De Sica
- Cinematography: Carlo Montuori
- Edited by: Fernando Tropea
- Release date: 1933
- Running time: 63 minutes
- Country: Italy
- Language: Italian

Bad Subject (Italian: Un cattivo soggetto) is a 1933 Italian comedy film directed by Carlo Ludovico Bragaglia and starring Vittorio De Sica. It is a remake of The Devil to Pay! (1930).

== Cast ==
- Vittorio De Sica as Willy
- Giuditta Rissone as Susanna, Willy's Sister
- Laura Nucci as Mary of Varietà
- Guglielmo Barnabò as Doraìs Uncle
- Amelia Chellini as Dora's Aunt
