= They've Kidnapped a Man =

- Directed by: Gennaro Righelli
- Written by: Aldo De Benedetti; Alessandro De Stefani; Gennaro Righelli
- Produced by: Renato Cogliati Dezza
- Starring: Vittorio De Sica; Caterina Boratto; Maria Denis
- Cinematography: Carlo Montuori
- Edited by: Giuseppe Fatigati; Fernando Tropea
- Music by: Cesare A. Bixio; Franco Casavola
- Production company: Juventus Film
- Distributed by: Consorzio Italiano Noleggiatori Filmi
- Release date: 12 October 1938
- Running time: 76 minutes
- Country: Italy
- Language: Italian

They've Kidnapped a Man (Italian: Hanno rapito un uomo) is a 1938 Italian white-telephone comedy film directed by Gennaro Righelli and starring Vittorio De Sica, Caterina Boratto and Maria Denis. It was shot at the Cinecittà Studios in Rome. The film's sets were designed by the art director Alfredo Montori.

== Cast ==
- Vittorio De Sica as L'attore cinematografico
- Caterina Boratto as La granduchessa Sonia
- Maria Denis as L'amichetta del attore
- Evelina Paoli as La zia di Sonia
- Romolo Costa as L'arciduca Cirillo
- Clara Calamai
- Raffaele Inghilo Ivanitsky
- Cirillo Konopleff
- Giulio Mostocotto
- Gennaro Sabatano
- Carlo Simoneschi

== Bibliography ==
- Roberto Chiti & Roberto Poppi. I film: Tutti i film italiani dal 1930 al 1944. Gremese Editore, 2005.
