= Mario Casaleggio =

Italian stage and film actor

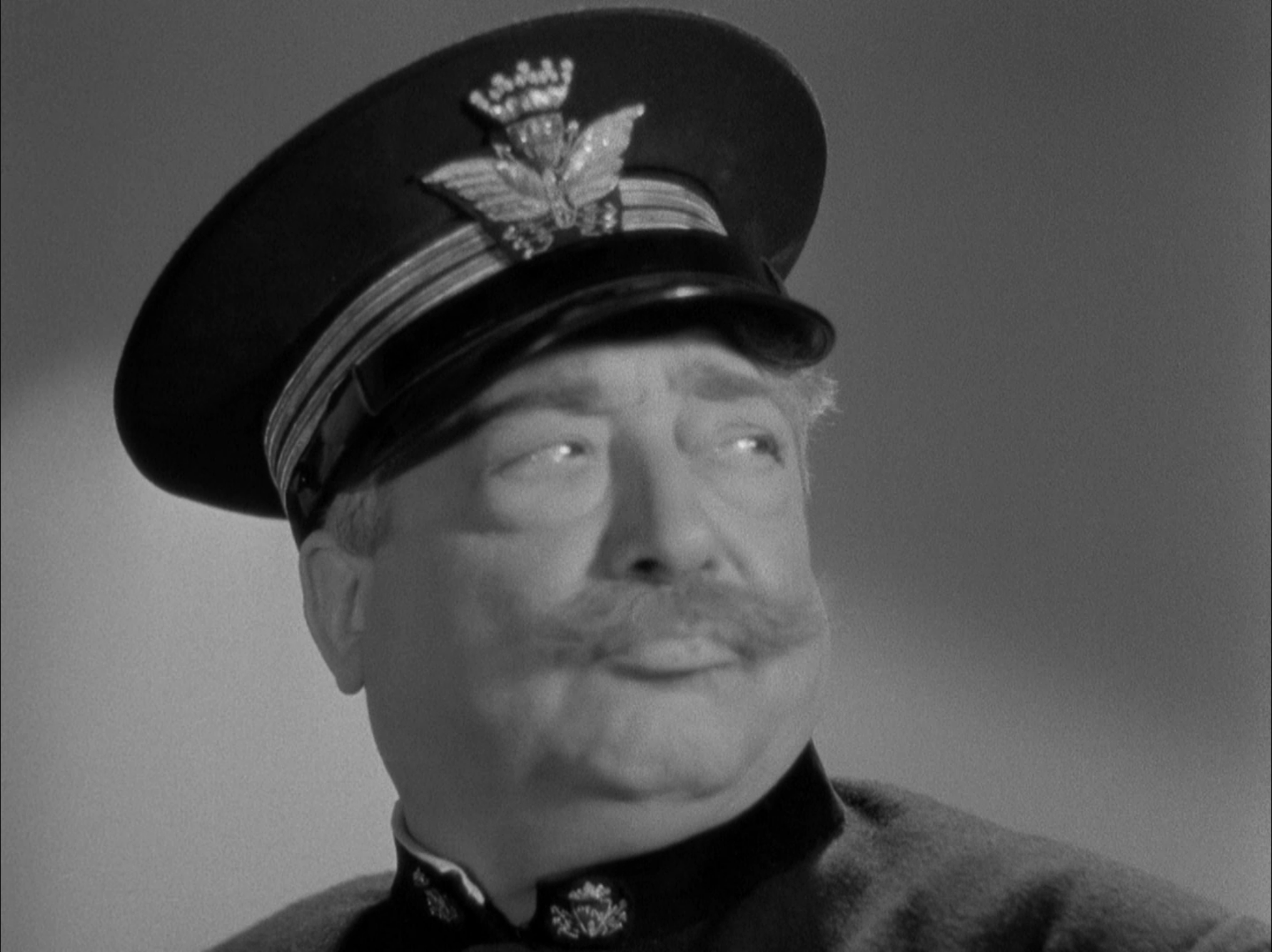
- Casaleggio in Il signor Max (1937)
- Born: 15 December 1877; Turin, Italy
- Died: 8 February 1953 (aged 75); Turin, Italy
- Occupation: Actor
- Years active: 1911-1942 (film)

Mario Casaleggio (15 December 1877 – 8 February 1953) was an Italian stage and film actor.

== Selected filmography ==
- Il signor Max (1937)
- Goodbye Youth (1940)
- Forbidden Music (1942)

== Bibliography ==
- Goble, Alan. The Complete Index to Literary Sources in Film. Walter de Gruyter, 1999.
