= Sette giorni all'altro mondo =

- Directed by: Mario Mattoli
- Written by: Aldo De Benedetti (play), Mario Mattoli (screenplay)
- Starring: Armando Falconi; Mimi Aylmer; Enrico Viarisio
- Release date: 1936
- Running time: 66 mins
- Country: Italy
- Language: Italian

Sette giorni all'altro mondo is a 1936 Italian "white-telephones" comedy film directed by Mario Mattoli.

== Cast ==
- Camillo Pilotto
- Vanna Vanni
- Franco Coop
- Nietta Zocchi
- Emilio Petacci
- Virgilio Riento
- Guglielmo Barnabò
- Stefano Sibaldi
- Clelia Bernacchi
- Flavio Díaz
- Romolo Balzani
- Rosina Adrario
- Carlo Chertier
- Carla Zaccaria
