= Schoolgirl Diary =

1941 film

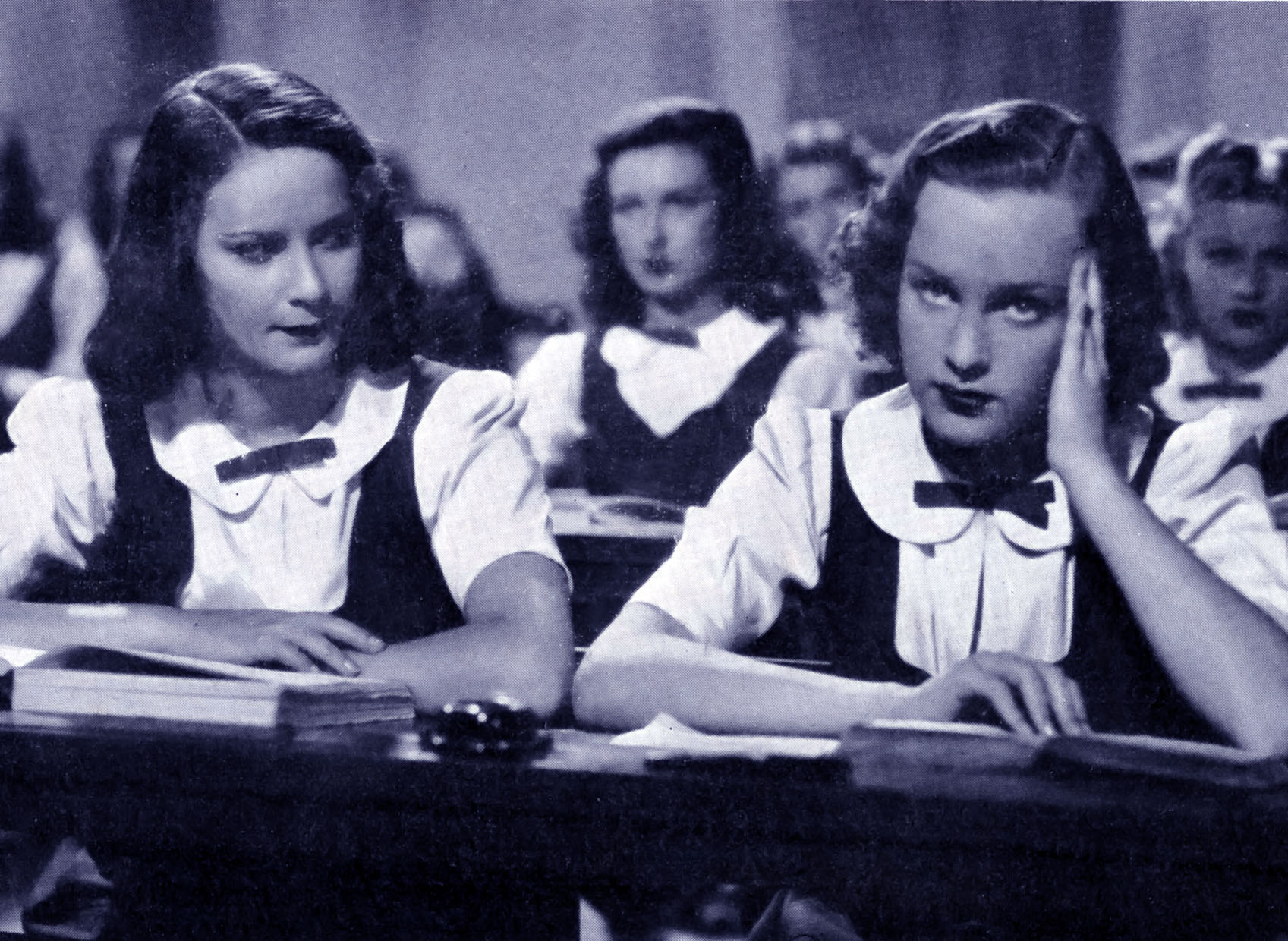
- Alida Valli and Irasema Dilián
- Directed by: Mario Mattoli
- Written by: Aldo De Benedetti; Marcello Marchesi; Mario Mattoli; Laura Pedrosi
- Produced by: Giulio Manenti
- Starring: Alida Valli
- Cinematography: Jan Stallich
- Edited by: Fernando Tropea
- Release date: 6 September 1941
- Running time: 95 minutes
- Country: Italy
- Language: Italian

Schoolgirl Diary (Italian: Ore 9: lezione di chimica) is a 1941 Italian "white-telephones" drama film directed by Mario Mattoli and starring Alida Valli.

== Cast ==
- Alida Valli as Anna Campolmi
- Irasema Dilián as Maria Rovani (as Irasema Dilian)
- Andrea Checchi as Il professore Marini
- Giuditta Rissone as La direttrice del collegio
- Ada Dondini as La signorina Elgsorina Mattei
- Carlo Campanini as Campanelli, il bidello
- Olga Solbelli as La signorina Bottelli
- Sandro Ruffini as Carlo Palmieri, padre di Maria
- Bianca Della Corte as Luisa
- Dedi Montano as L'insegnate di musica
