= Romolo Costa =

Italian actor (1897-1965)

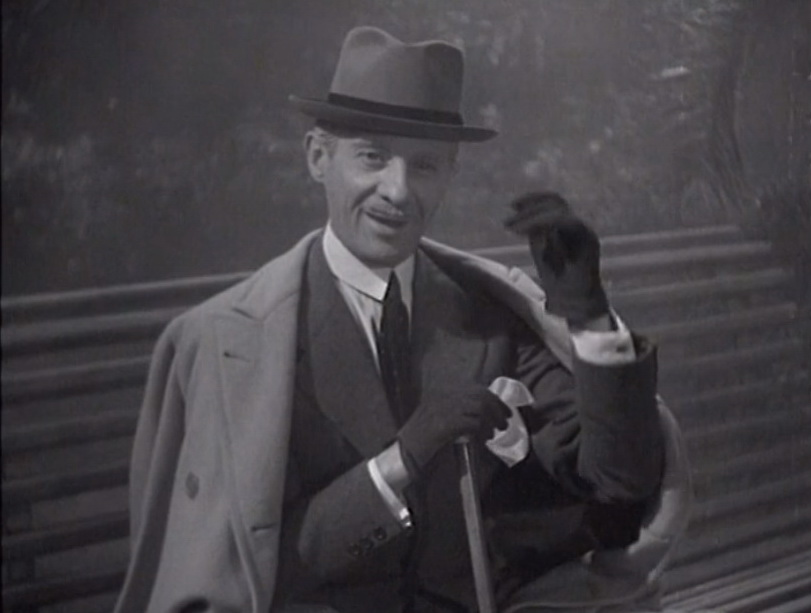
- Costa in A Husband for the Month of April (1941)
- Born: 26 February 1897; Asti, Kingdom of Italy
- Died: 1 January 1965 (aged 67); Rome, Italy
- Occupations: Actor; voice actor
- Years active: 1932–1965

Romolo Costa (26 February 1897 – 1 January 1965) was an Italian actor and voice actor.

== Biography ==
Costa appeared in more than seventy films and television series between 1934 and 1964 and he was a character actor who generally appeared in supporting roles. Occasionally he played a more prominent role as in Il destino in tasca. He also worked extensively as a voice actor, dubbing foreign films for release in Italy. He served as a substitute for Emilio Cigoli as the Italian voice of Gary Cooper.

== Selected filmography ==
- Pergolesi (1932)
- Steel (1933)
- Together in the Dark (1933)
- Loyalty of Love (1934)
- Like the Leaves (1935)
- Aldebaran (1935)
- The Joker King (1935)
- Bayonet (1936)
- The Ambassador (1936)
- I've Lost My Husband! (1937)
- Il signor Max (1937)
- Doctor Antonio (1937)
- Il destino in tasca (1938)
- They've Kidnapped a Man (1938)
- The Two Mothers (1938)
- Departure (1938)
- The Knight of San Marco (1939)
- Heartbeat (1939)
- Two Million for a Smile (1939)
- The Boarders at Saint-Cyr (1939)
- Backstage (1939)
- Marionette (1939)
- Diamonds (1939)
- The Faceless Voice (1939)
- Eternal Melodies (1940)
- Beyond Love (1940)
- A Husband for the Month of April (1941)
- Once a Week (1942)
- A Pistol Shot (1942)
- Rossini (1942)
- Songs in the Streets (1950)

== Bibliography ==
- Goble, Alan. The Complete Index to Literary Sources in Film. Walter de Gruyter, 1999.
