= To Live (1937 film) =

- Directed by: Guido Brignone
- Written by: Tomaso Smith; Amleto Palermi; Guido Brignone
- Produced by: Livio Pavanelli
- Starring: Tito Schipa; Caterina Boratto; Nino Besozzi; Paola Borboni
- Cinematography: Otello Martelli
- Edited by: Giuseppe Fatigati
- Music by: Cesare A. Bixio; Domenico Cortopassi
- Production company: Società Anonima Films Attualità
- Distributed by: Metro-Goldwyn-Mayer
- Release date: 1937
- Running time: 88 minutes
- Country: Italy
- Language: Italian

To Live (Italian: Vivere!) is a 1937 Italian musical drama film directed by Guido Brignone and starring Tito Schipa, Caterina Boratto and Nino Besozzi. The film is noted for its title song, composed by Cesare A. Bixio. It was distributed by the Italian subsidiary of MGM.

== Cast ==
- Tito Schipa as Tito Di Lauro
- Caterina Boratto as Paola - sua figlia
- Nino Besozzi as Mario Deli
- Armando Migliari as L'impresario Arden
- Paola Borboni as Emma
- Guglielmo Barnabò as Il presidente del consorzio
- Mercedes Brignone as Signora Montorsi
- Giuseppe Pierozzi as Marsano - il segretari
- Oreste Fares as Il pianista Bardella
- Olga Vittoria Gentilli as Signora Bardella
- Mario Brizzolari as Il direttore del consorzio
- Fernando De Crucciati as Dottor Serafini
- Elodia Maresca as La signora del casolare
- Nietta Zocchi as Una spettatrice al concerto
- Mario Pucci as Blasio
- Edda Soligo as Una signora al tabarin
- Olinto Cristina as Un ascaltatore all'audizione
- Luigi Erminio D'Olivo as Altro ascaltatore
- Renato Malavasi as Terzo ascaltatore

== Bibliography ==
- Moliterno, Gino. Historical Dictionary of Italian Cinema. Scarecrow Press, 2008.
