= Gabriele Varriale =

- Occupation: Film editor
- Years active: 1935–1962 (film)

Gabriele Varriale was an Italian film editor and assistant director active between 1935 and 1962. He also co-directed the 1941 comedy Idyll in Budapest.

== Selected filmography ==
- We Were Seven Sisters (1939)
- Then We'll Get a Divorce (1940)
- Scampolo (1941)
- A Woman Has Fallen (1941)
- Idyll in Budapest (1941)
- After Casanova's Fashion (1942)
- Torrents of Spring (1942)
- Music on the Run (1943)
- Two Suffer Better Than One (1943)
- The Adulteress (1946)
- The Sun Still Rises (1946)
- The White Devil (1947)
- Bitter Rice (1949)
- The Devil in the Convent (1950)
- Anna (1951)
- Four Red Roses (1951)
- Rome 11:00 (1952)
- Finishing School (1953)
- Angels of Darkness (1954)
- Sunset in Naples (1955)
- The Prince with the Red Mask (1955)
- Le ambiziose (1961)
- Constantine and the Cross (1961)

== Bibliography ==
- Roberto Chiti & Roberto Poppi. I film: Tutti i film italiani dal 1930 al 1944. Gremese Editore, 2005.
