= Tragic Serenade =

1951 film directed by Giuseppe Guarino

- Directed by: Giuseppe Guarino
- Written by: Renato Borraccetti; Domenico Gambino
- Cinematography: Giovanni Ventimiglia
- Edited by: Jenner Menghi
- Music by: Cesare A. Bixio
- Production company: Nemi Film
- Distributed by: Nemi Film
- Release date: 9 August 1951
- Country: Italy
- Language: Italian

Tragic Serenade (Italian: Serenata tragica) is a 1951 Italian drama film directed by Giuseppe Guarino.

The film's sets were designed by Alfredo Montori. It was made at the Cinecittà Studios in Rome.

== Cast ==
- Ignazio Balsamo
- Carlo Giustini as don Peppino
- Laura Gore as Zia di Margherita
- Giovanni Grasso
- Folco Lulli as Don Vincenzo Matturini
- Silvia Moguet
- Giancarlo Nicotra
- Giovanna Pala
- Luigi Pavese
- Dori Romano
- Renato Della Torre
- Mirella Uberti as Margherita
- Mario Vitale

== Bibliography ==
- Emiliano Morreale. Così piangevano: il cinema melò nell'Italia degli anni Cinquanta. Donzelli Editore, 2011.
