= Lilia Dale =

Italian film actress (1919–1991)

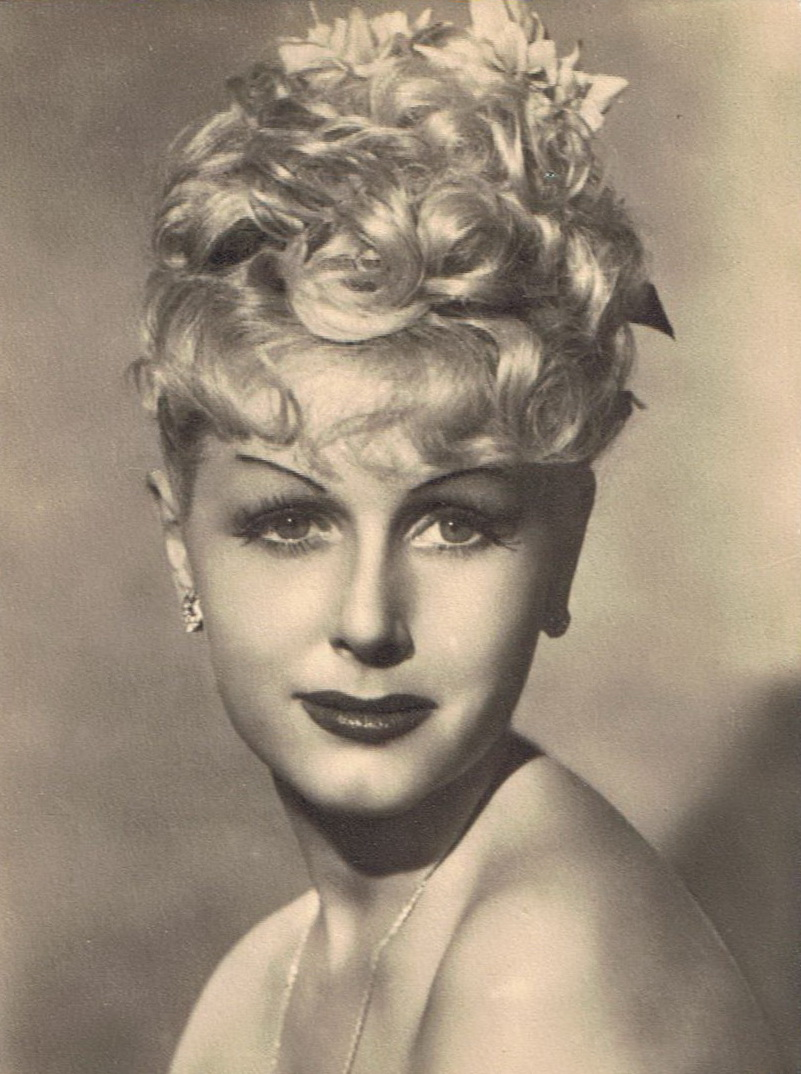
- Dale, c. 1940s
- Born: 18 July 1919; Pola, Kingdom of Italy
- Died: 3 December 1991 (aged 72); Padua, Italy
- Other name: Koralin Hand
- Occupation: Actress
- Years active: 1937–1940 (film)

Lilia Dale (18 July 1919 – 3 December 1991) was an Italian film actress.

Dale was born in Pola on 18 July 1919, and died in Padua on 3 December 1991, at the age of 72.

== Selected filmography ==
- Il signor Max (1937)
- Nonna Felicità (1938)
- Mad Animals (1939)
- Who Are You? (1939)
- Red Tavern (1940)
- Manon Lescaut (1940)

== Bibliography ==
- Bert Cardullo. Vittorio De Sica: Actor, Director, Auteur. Cambridge Scholars Publishing, 2009.
