= Gino Valori =

- Born: 30 April 1890; Florence, Tuscany; Italy
- Died: 28 May 1961 (aged 71); Rome, Lazio; Italy
- Occupations: Director; Screenwriter
- Years active: 1936–1943

Gino Valori (1890–1961) was an Italian screenwriter and film director. He directed the 1939 film Equatore (1939).

== Selected filmography ==
=== Screenwriter ===
- The White Squadron (1936)
- The Phantom Gondola (1936)

=== Director ===
- Equatore (1939)
- Who Are You? (1939)

== Bibliography ==
- Goble, Alan. The Complete Index to Literary Sources in Film. Walter de Gruyter, 1999.
