= The Knight of San Marco =

- Mario Ferrari and Laura Nucci in a scene from the film
- Directed by: Gennaro Righelli
- Written by: Edoardo Anton; Renato Castellani; Luigi Chiarelli; Alessandro De Stefani; Riccardo Freda; Gherardo Gherardi; Gennaro Righelli
- Produced by: Renato Cogliati Dezza
- Starring: Mario Ferrari; Dria Paola; Laura Nucci
- Cinematography: Domenico Scala
- Edited by: Vincenzo Zampi
- Music by: Cesare A. Bixio; Franco Casavola
- Production company: Juventus Film
- Distributed by: Artisti Associati
- Release date: 10 April 1939
- Running time: 75 minutes
- Country: Italy
- Language: Italian

The Knight of San Marco (Italian: Il cavaliere di San Marco) is a 1939 Italian historical drama film directed by Gennaro Righelli and starring Mario Ferrari, Dria Paola and Laura Nucci. It is set during the Risorgimento. It was made at Cinecittà, with sets designed by the art director Alfredo Montori.

== Cast ==
- Mario Ferrari as Daniele Orsenigo
- Dria Paola as Stefania
- Laura Nucci as Teresa
- Romolo Costa as Tito Orsenigo
- Sandro Ruffini as Orsenigo padre
- Renato Cialente as Il commissario von Krauss
- Vanna Vanni as Bianca
- Augusto Di Giovanni as Bauer
- Michele Malaspina as Andrea
- Ruggero Capodaglio
- Pina De Angelis
- Corrado De Cenzo
- Anita Farra
- Giovanni Ferrari
- Pietro Nofri
- Massimo Pianforini
- Ivano Viganò
- Loretta Vinci
- Liliana Zanardi

== Bibliography ==
- Piero Zanotto. Veneto in film: il censimento del cinema ambientato nel territorio, 1895-2002. Marsilio, 2002.
