= I Don't Know You Anymore =

1936 film directed by Nunzio Malasomma

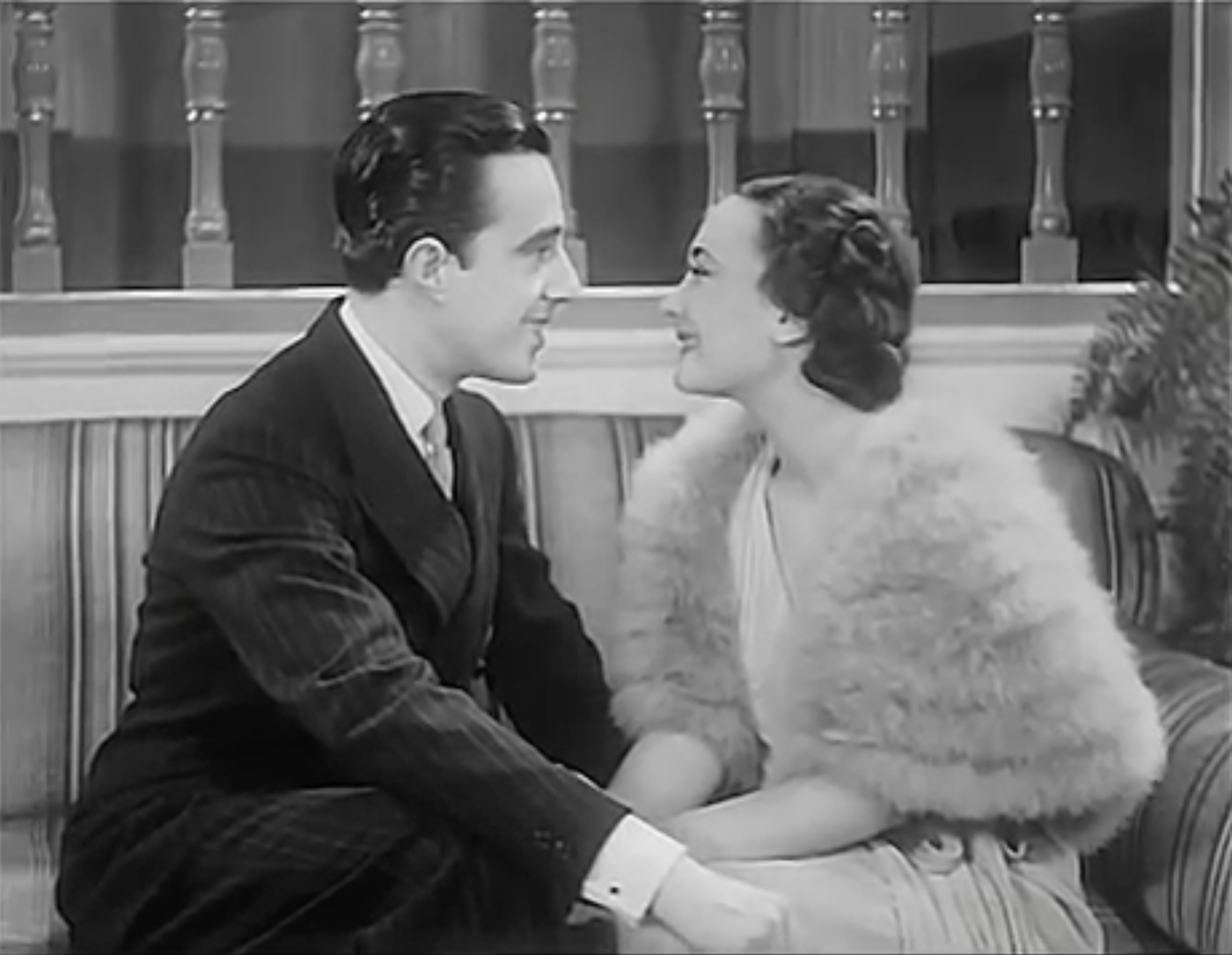
- De Sica and Merlini in a film scene
- Directed by: Nunzio Malasomma
- Produced by: Giuseppe Amato
- Starring: Vittorio De Sica
- Release date: 1936
- Running time: 65 minutes
- Country: Italy
- Language: Italian

I Don't Know You Anymore (Italian: Non ti conosco più) is a 1936 Italian "white-telephones" comedy film directed by Nunzio Malasomma and starring Vittorio De Sica. It is based on a play by Aldo De Benedetti.

== Cast ==
- Vittorio De Sica as Professor Spinelli, psychiatrist
- Elsa Merlini as Luisa Malpieri
- Enrico Viarisio as Luisa's husband
