= Who Are You? (1939 film) =

- Directed by: Gino Valori
- Written by: Gino Valori
- Produced by: Paolo Granata; Francesco Granata-Vigo
- Starring: María Denis; Antonio Centa; Lilia Dale
- Cinematography: Mario Albertelli
- Music by: Cesare A. Bixio
- Production company: Società Anonima Generale Italiana Film
- Distributed by: Consorzio Italiano Noleggiatori Filmi
- Release date: 3 March 1939
- Running time: 67 minutes
- Country: Italy
- Language: Italian

Who Are You? (Italian: Chi sei tu?) is a 1939 Italian comedy film directed by Gino Valori and starring María Denis, Antonio Centa and Lilia Dale.

== Cast ==
- María Denis as Francesca
- Antonio Centa as Maurizio / l'attore Man Rowel
- Lilia Dale as Lorenza
- Guido Barbarisi as Michele
- Cesare Zoppetti as Il nonno
- Adele Mosso as La nonna
- Giovanni Ardizzone
- Vasco Creti
- Aedo Galvani
- Pino Locchi
- Elettra Terzolo

== Bibliography ==
- Ricci, Steven. Cinema and Fascism: Italian Film and Society, 1922–1943. University of California Press, 2008.
