= The Boarders at Saint-Cyr =

1939 film

- Directed by: Gennaro Righelli
- Written by: Alessandro De Stefani; Carlo Veneziani
- Based on: Les Demoiselles de Saint-Cyr by Alexandre Dumas
- Produced by: Giorgio Carini
- Starring: Vanna Vanni; Silvana Jachino; Maurizio D'Ancora
- Cinematography: Domenico Scala
- Edited by: Gennaro Righelli
- Music by: Renzo Rossellini
- Production company: Mediterranea Film
- Distributed by: Consorzio Italiano Noleggiatori Filmi
- Release date: December 1939
- Running time: 88 minutes
- Country: Italy
- Language: Italian

The Boarders at Saint-Cyr (Italian: Le educande di Saint-Cyr) is a 1939 Italian historical comedy film directed by Gennaro Righelli and starring Vanna Vanni, Silvana Jachino and Maurizio D'Ancora. It is an adaptation of the 1843 play Les Demoiselles de Saint-Cyr by Alexandre Dumas. It was shot at the Cinecittà Studios in Rome. The film's sets were designed by the art director Alfredo Montori.

== Synopsis ==
In Napoleonic France two girls at a boarding school next door to the Saint-Cyr military academy in Paris are visited by a couple of cadets who climb over the wall to woo them. However they are discovered and in the ensuing scandal the Empress Josephine insists that they have to hastily get married. Napoleon himself intervenes, in sympathy to the two forces husbands, and sends them on an immediate mission to the Kingdom of Naples ruled by his own brother-in-law Marshal Joachim Murat. Abandoned on their wedding night the two young woman head to Italy in pursuit of their new husbands.

== Cast ==
- Vanna Vanni as Gisella Montclair
- Silvana Jachino as Gemmina Merian
- Maurizio D'Ancora as Renato Marchand
- Elio Steiner as Marcello di St. Herem
- Luigi Carini as Napoleone Bonaparte
- Maria Jacobini as L'imperatrice Giuseppina
- Lola Braccini as La direttrice del collegio
- Carlo Tamberlani as Gioacchino Murat
- Enzo Gainotti as D'Acqueville
- Romolo Costa as La Rochelle
- Eugenio Duse as L'aiutante di La Rochelle
- Nino Marchesini as Aubry
- Pina Gallini as L'insegnante di buon comportamento
- Liana Del Balzo as L'insegnante di musica
- Olinto Cristina as Il marchese di St. Herem
- Giuseppe Addobbati as Un caddetto
- Gustavo Serena as L'ufficiale di Stato Maggiore

== Bibliography ==
- Goble, Alan. The Complete Index to Literary Sources in Film. Walter de Gruyter, 1999.
- Reich, Jacqueline Beth. Fascism, Film, and Female Subjectivity: The Case of Italian Cinema 1936-1943. University of California, Berkeley, 1994.
