= Ivo Perilli =

Italian screenwriter (1902–1994)

- Born: 10 April 1902; Rome, Italy
- Died: 24 November 1994 (aged 92); Rome, Italy
- Occupation: Screenwriter
- Years active: 1933–1977

Ivo Perilli (10 April 1902 – 24 November 1994) was an Italian screenwriter. He wrote for more than 50 films between 1933 and 1977.

== Selected filmography ==
- Figaro and His Great Day (1931)
- Lowered Sails (1931)
- La Wally (1932)
- I'll Always Love You (1933)
- Ragazzo (1934)
- Red Passport (1935)
- Like the Leaves (1935)
- Ginevra degli Almieri (1935)
- The Dance of Time (1936)
- The Amnesiac (1936)
- I'll Give a Million (1936)
- Luciano Serra, Pilot (1938)
- The Count of Brechard (1938)
- Mad Animals (1939)
- Heartbeat (1939)
- The Document (1939)
- I, His Father (1939)
- Department Store (1939)
- The Faceless Voice (1939)
- A Romantic Adventure (1940)
- The Betrothed (1941)
- The Captain's Daughter (1947)
- Prelude to Madness (1948)
- The Wolf of the Sila (1949)
- The Ungrateful Heart (1951)
- Anna (1951)
- Europa '51 (1952)
- The Blind Woman of Sorrento (1952)
- Le infedeli (1953)
- Ulysses (1954)
- The Miller's Beautiful Wife (1955)
- Sunset in Naples (1955)
- War and Peace (1956)
- The Courier of Moncenisio (1956)
