= Department Store (1939 film) =

1939 film

- Directed by: Mario Camerini
- Written by: Mario Camerini; Renato Castellani; Mario Pannunzio; Ivo Perilli
- Produced by: Giuseppe Amato
- Cinematography: Anchise Brizzi
- Edited by: Giovanna Del Bosco; Mario Camerini
- Music by: Alessandro Cicognini; Giovanni D'Anzi; Cesare A. Bixio
- Production companies: Amato Film; Era Film
- Distributed by: Generalcine
- Release date: 10 August 1939
- Running time: 85 minutes
- Country: Italy
- Language: Italian

Department Store (Italian:I grandi magazzini) is a 1939 Italian "white-telephones" comedy film directed by Mario Camerini.

It was made at the Cinecittà studios in Rome. The film entered the competition at the 7th Venice International Film Festival.

== Cast ==
- Vittorio De Sica as Bruno Zacchi
- Assia Noris as Lauretta Corelli
- Enrico Glori as Bertini, the chief of staff
- Luisella Beghi as Emilia
- Virgilio Riento as Gaetano
- Milena Penovich as Anna
- Andrea Checchi as Maurizio
- Mattia Giancola as Pietro, Anna's brother
- Renato Alberini
- Aldo Capacci as the young man in the lift
- Nino Crisman as the warehouse inspector
- Dhia Cristiani as the furniture department's salesperson
- Dino De Laurentiis as the errand boy
- Peppino De Martino as the timecard clerk
- Giovanni Ferrari
- Alba Ferrarotti as a saleswoman
- Diana Floriani as a saleswoman
- Nora Lenner as a saleswoman
- Loredana as a saleswoman
- Mirto Lusso
- Nino Marchetti as the enquiry inspector
- Bebi Nucci as a saleswoman
- Amalia Pellegrini as lady asking for raincoats
- Alfredo Petroni as department store director
- Amina Pirani Maggi as the lady in the woolen cap
- Giuseppe Rinaldi as a skier
- Umberto Sacripante as Pietro
- Carlo Simoneschi
- Dida Spaida as Lucia
- Liliana Vismara as Rina
- Liliana Zanardi as director's secretary
- Nietta Zocchi as ugly saleswoman
