= Alfredo Montori =

Italian art director (1893–1969)

- Born: 17 February 1893; Rome, Italy
- Died: 4 June 1969 (aged 76); Rome, Italy
- Occupation: Art director
- Years active: 1929–1967

Alfredo Montori (17 February 1893 — 4 June 1969) was an Italian art director. He designed the sets for more than a hundred films.

== Selected filmography ==
- My Little One (1933)
- Lady of Paradise (1934)
- Lohengrin (1936)
- The Ferocious Saladin (1937)
- A Lady Did It (1938)
- They've Kidnapped a Man (1938)
- The Knight of San Marco (1939)
- The Boarders at Saint-Cyr (1939)
- The Faceless Voice (1939)
- The Hussar Captain (1940)
- A Husband for the Month of April (1941)
- The Two Tigers (1941)
- Music on the Run (1943)
- Flying Squadron (1949)
- The Cliff of Sin (1950)
- Stormbound (1950)
- Beauties on Bicycles (1951)
- Without a Flag (1951)
- Tragic Serenade (1951)
- The Black Captain (1951)
- Mamma Mia, What an Impression! (1951)
- Abracadabra (1952)
- The Legend of the Piave (1952)
- Naples Sings (1953)
- Tragic Ballad (1954)
- Letter from Naples (1954)
- It Takes Two to Sin in Love (1954)
- Goodbye Naples (1955)
- The Knight of the Black Sword (1956)
- The Son of the Red Corsair (1959)

== Bibliography ==
- Gary Allen Smith. Epic Films: Casts, Credits and Commentary on More Than 350 Spectacle Movies. McFarland, 2004.
