= Mario Camerini =

Italian film director and screenwriter (1895–1981)

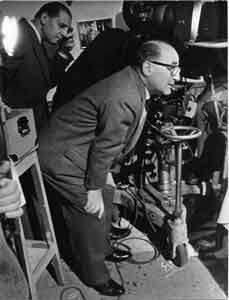
- Born: 6 February 1895; Rome, Kingdom of Italy
- Died: 4 February 1981 (aged 85); Gardone Riviera, Italy
- Occupations: Film director, screenwriter
- Years active: 1920–1972
- Spouse: Assia Noris (m. 1940; ann. 1943)

Mario Camerini (6 February 1895 – 4 February 1981) was an Italian film director and screenwriter. Camerini made the most well-known films in Italy during the 1930s, most of them comedies starring Vittorio De Sica. He directed about fifty films until 1972, including 1954's Ulysses with American stars Kirk Douglas and Anthony Quinn, one of the first Europe/US film co-productions.

== Biography ==
=== Early life and education ===
Mario Camerini was born in Rome on 6 February 1895 to Camillo Camerini, a prominent socialist politician and lawyer from L'Aquila, and Laura Genina. He attended the Liceo Torquato Tasso, where he and a fellow student wrote the screenplay for the crime thriller Le mani ignote, produced by Cines. He studied law at the Sapienza University but did not graduate. Ath the outbreak of World War I, he enlisted as an officer in the Bersaglieri. After the end of the war, he returned to Rome, where he co-wrote several screenplays for Cines with his brother, Augusto, and his cousin, the prolific director Augusto Genina. He also worked as an assistant director on several of Genina's films. The first film entirely directed by Camerini — although it was still signed by Genina, who was also the producer — was Jolly o Jollyclown da circo, released in 1923. It was based on a story by Orio Vergani and starred Diomira Jacobini, with whom Camerini had a long-term relationship.

=== Early career ===
Following its booming success in the silent era, Italian cinema suffered a severe industrial decline in the 1920s. During this period, Camerini briefly joined one of the few still thriving Italian film production companies: Stefano Pittaluga's Fert Studios. While working for Fert, Camerini shot several films, including The House of Pulcini (1924), Voglio tradire mio marito, Saetta principe per un giorno and Maciste against the Sheik (1925). While remaining faithful to the prevalent formats of the time, these films, in some cases, foreshadowed the tone that would later become characteristic of Camerini's work. As the crisis deepened between 1925 and 1928, Camerini was forced to limit himself to editing foreign films. In 1928, he founded the small company Autori direttori italiani associati, ADIA together with his friends Aldo De Benedetti and Luciano Doria. He then directed the silent war film Kif Tebbi, which was shot almost entirely in Tripoli and other locations in Cyrenaica. The following year, on the eve of the advent of sound, he directed his first major film, Rails. The film contains many elements that would become characteristic of Camerini's mature style, such as his interest in ordinary people, his attention to detail, and his emphasis on the importance of photography and editing. The film launched Camerini's career, receiving considerable critical acclaim. For a long time, it was considered his finest work, even surpassing his later, more renowned movies.

=== The advent of sound and the Fascist period ===
To get a firsthand look at the "talkies," director Mario Camerini went to France in 1930 to work at Paramount’s Joinville studios near Paris. There, he directed the Italian version of Dangerous Paradise (released as La riva dei bruti), familiarized himself with new sound equipment, and mastered editing techniques with split soundtracks. It was during this time that Camerini conceived the idea of using separate films for photography and sound recording — a process that would become common practice. This process allowed the photographic film to be cut freely, giving the director full freedom to impose the desired rhythm on the film's progression during editing, as was the case with silent films.

After returning to Italy in July 1931, Camerini directed the comedy film Figaro and His Great Day, based on a play by Arnaldo Fraccaroli. The film tells the story of a travelling opera troupe performing in a small provincial town. The serious tone of Rails was replaced by the comedic and ironic atmosphere that would become a defining feature of Camerini's work. While working on Figaro, Camerini met Mario Soldati, who worked as a clapperboard operator, and Ivo Perilli, a set and costume designer. Soldati and Perilli would later collaborate as assistant directors and screenwriters on some of Camerini's most important films. Following the release of the minor film The Last Adventure, starring Armando Falconi and Diomira Jacobini, in 1932, Camerini directed his most famous work, What Scoundrels Men Are!., starring Lia Franca and Vittorio De Sica. Produced by Cines, the film was a small masterpiece in the genre of sentimental comedy and enjoyed great public success. It marked the beginning of a particularly successful period for De Sica, who, alongside Blasetti, was recognised as one of the most significant figures in contemporary Italian cinema.

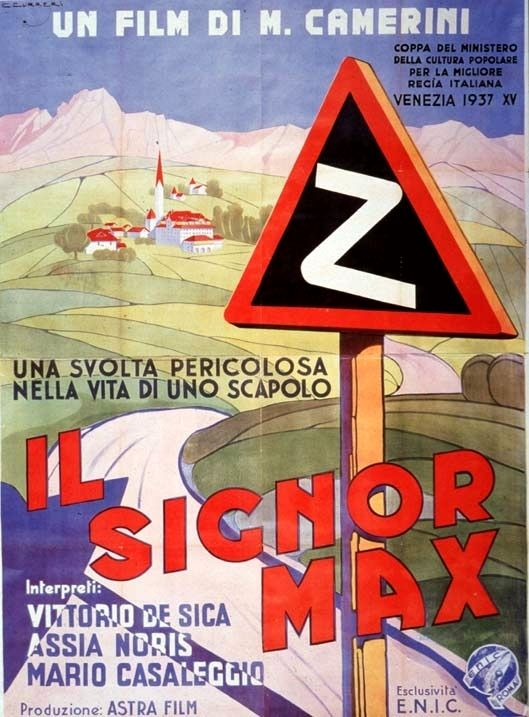
Advertising poster for Camerini's Il signor Max (1937)

In 1933, Camerini directed the romantic comedy I'll Always Love You, starring future movie star Elsa De Giorgi. He also directed the brilliant detective fiction film Giallo, starring Assia Noris, who would become his favourite actress and partner. The couple married in 1940. In 1934, Camerini filmed two adaptations of famous literary works: Come le foglie, based on a play by Giuseppe Giacosa and starring Isa Miranda, Mimì Aylmer and Nino Besozzi; and The Three-Cornered Hat, based on the novel of the same name by Pedro Antonio de Alarcón. These two films marked the beginning of Camerini's collaboration with screenwriter Ercole Patti. The following year, 1935, he began working with Cesare Zavattini, who wrote the story and screenplay for one of Camerini's finest films: I'll Give a Million, which won first prize at the 4th Venice International Film Festival.

In 1936, Camerini directed But It's Nothing Serious, an adaptation of Pirandello's eponymous play, starring Vittorio De Sica, Elisa Cegani and Assia Noris. That same year, the Fascist government commissioned Camerini to direct the propaganda film The Great Appeal. The project was directly spearheaded by Luigi Freddi, the powerful Director General of Cinematography, who wanted grand-scale films to celebrate Italy's recent conquest of Ethiopia. Camerini's relationship with Fascism was always lukewarm — the director never joined the party — and remained so even after this episode. The authorities disliked the movie, considering it too bland as a propaganda film.

In 1937, Camerini directed the comedy Il signor Max, starring De Sica, Noris, Rubi Dalma and Umberto Melnati. Amleto Palermi wrote the screenplay, based on an idea by Mario Soldati. A masterpiece of pacing, the film marked the pinnacle of Camerini's career. Over the next few years, he directed several comedies that enjoyed unparalleled success and widespread critical acclaim.

=== Post-war period ===
Following the end of World War II, Camerini attempted to adapt to the post-war shift in Italian cinema by making films such as Two Anonymous Letters (1945, starring Andrea Checchi and Clara Calamai) and The Street Has Many Dreams (1948, starring Anna Magnani and Massimo Girotti). He went on to demonstrate his talent and craftsmanship in stylistically challenging films such as Il Brigante Musolino (1950, starring Amedeo Nazzari and Silvana Mangano), large-scale international productions such as Ulysses (1954, loosely based on the Odyssey and featuring notable American actors such as Kirk Douglas and Anthony Quinn), comedy dramas such as The Awakening (1956, starring Anna Magnani) and First Love (1959), and whodunits such as Crimen (1960, starring Vittorio Gassman, Alberto Sordi, Nino Manfredi, Franca Valeri and Silvana Mangano) and The Almost Perfect Crime (1966, starring Philippe Leroy). Even in his less significant and more routine works, he proved himself to be a skilled and meticulous craftsman. However, the delicate colours and half-tones of sentimental comedy that were the hallmarks of his style could not find their place in a cinema that had become synonymous with neorealist drama and the harsh satire of Commedia all'italiana.

The last film of his career, Don Camillo e i giovani d'oggi, was made in 1972. By this time, the elderly director had already left Rome and moved to Gardone Riviera with his second wife, Tulli Hruska. The couple married in 1946 and had two daughters, Laura and Anna Maria. Camerini died in Gardone Riviera on 4 February 1981.

== Selected filmography ==
=== Silent films ===
Year	Title	Preservation status
1923	Wally	Lost
1923	Jolly clown da circo	Lost
1924	The House of Pulcini	Lost
1923	Voglio tradire mio marito	Lost
1923	Saetta, principe per un giorno	Lost
1923	Maciste against the Sheik	Public domain; Cineteca di Bologna
1928	Kif Tebbi	Public domain; Cineteca di Bologna, EYE Film Institute Netherlands
1929	Rails	Public domain; Cineteca Italiana

Sound films

Year	Title	Notes
1931	Figaro and His Great Day	
1932	The Last Adventure	
1932	What Scoundrels Men Are!	
1933	Giallo	Eearly precursor of the successful Italian Giallo film genre, which boomed after the Second World War.
1933	I'll Always Love You	In 1943 Camerini remade the film under the same title
1935	The Three-Cornered Hat	
1935	Like the Leaves	
1936	The Great Appeal	Also known by the alternative title The Last Roll-Call
1936	I'll Give a Million	It had an American remake in 1938, directed by Walter Lang and starring Warner Baxter, Marjorie Weaver and Peter Lorre.
1936	But It's Nothing Serious	Two years later Camerini remade it as a German film The Man Who Couldn't Say No.
1937	Il signor Max	
1939	Department Store	
1939	Heartbeat	It was remade in France as Beating Heart in 1940, and then again in Hollywood as a 1946 film of the same title starring Ginger Rogers and Basil Rathbone.
1939	The Document	
1940	One Hundred Thousand Dollars	
1940	A Romantic Adventure	
1941	The Betrothed	
1942	Love Story	
1945	Two Anonymous Letters	
1947	The Captain's Daughter	
1948	The Street Has Many Dreams	
1950	Outlaw Girl	
1951	Honeymoon Deferred	Separate English- and Italian-language versions were released.
1952	Sunday Heroes	
1952	Wife for a Night	Based on the play The Dazzling Hour by Anna Bonacci which was later updated for the Billy Wilder film Kiss Me, Stupid.
1954	Ulysses	International co-production between Italy, France, and the United States
1955	The Miller's Beautiful Wife	
1956	The Awakening	
1957	Count Max	
1957	Holiday Island	
1959	First Love	
1960	And Suddenly It's Murder!	The movie had three remakes: Io non vedo, tu non parli, lui non sente directed by Camerini in 1971 and starred Gastone Moschin, Enrico Montesano and Alighiero Noschese, and Once Upon a Crime, in 1992, directed by Eugene Levy and starred John Candy and James Belushi in main roles.
1960	The Italian Brigands	
1963	Kali Yug: Goddess of Vengeance	
1963	The Mystery of the Indian Temple	
1966	Imperfect Murder	

== Bibliography ==
- Lizzani, Carlo (1982). Il cinema italiano dalle origini agli anni Ottanta. Rome: Editori Riuniti. pp. 336–356.
- Cimmino, Alessandra (2003). "Camerini, Mario". Enciclopedia del Cinema. Rome: Istituto dell'Enciclopedia Italiana.
- Ricci, Steven (2008). Cinema and Fascism: Italian Film and Society, 1922–1943. Berkeley: University of California Press. ISBN 978-0520253568.
- Moliterno, Gino (2009). The A to Z of Italian Cinema. Lanham, Maryland: Scarecrow Press. ISBN 978-0810870598.
