= Heartbeat (1939 film) =

1939 film

- Directed by: Mario Camerini
- Written by: Lilly Janüsse (novel); Renato Castellani; Leo Longanesi; Ivo Perilli; Mario Camerini
- Produced by: Giuseppe Amato
- Starring: Assia Noris; John Lodge; Rubi D'Alma
- Cinematography: Anchise Brizzi
- Edited by: Mario Camerini; Giovanna Del Bosco
- Music by: Cesare A. Bixio; Roberto Caggiani
- Production company: Era Film
- Distributed by: Generalcine
- Release date: 16 January 1939
- Running time: 87 minutes
- Country: Italy
- Language: Italian

Heartbeat (Italian: Batticuore) is a 1939 Italian "white-telephones" comedy film directed by Mario Camerini and starring Assia Noris, John Lodge and Rubi D'Alma. It was remade in France as Beating Heart in 1940, and then again in Hollywood as a 1946 film of the same title starring Ginger Rogers and Basil Rathbone.

It was shot at the Cinecittà Studios in Rome. The film's sets were designed by the art director Gastone Medin. It is part of the tradition of White Telephone comedies.

== Synopsis ==
In Paris a young woman working at a school for thieves attempts to pick the pocket of an aristocrat. Instead of turning her in he blackmails her into stealing a clock from an ambassador.

== Cast ==
- Assia Noris as Arlette / La baronessina Dvorak
- John Lodge as Lord Jerry Dansbury
- Rubi D'Alma as Contessa Maciaky
- Giuseppe Porelli as Il conte Mirko Maciaky
- Maurizio D'Ancora as Yves, il ladruncolo
- Armando Migliari as il commissario Dupont
- Luigi Almirante as Il professore Teofilo Comte
- Pina Gallini as Giulia Comte
- Calisto Bertramo as Il barone Dvorak
- Romolo Costa as Il capitano Kurt
- Giulio Stival as L'ambasciatore di Lucrazia
- Guglielmo Barnabò as Un detectivo dell'albergo 'Majestic'
- Luisella Beghi as Una ragazza disoccupata
- Bruno Calabretta as James
- Giorgio Capecchi as Il portiere dell'albergo 'Majestic'
- Dino De Laurentiis as Il fattorino del fioraio
- Aldo Fiorelli as Un allievo del professore Comte
- Aristide Garbini as Il brigadiere di polizia
- Alfredo Martinelli as Il segretario della 'Winterthur'
- Emilio Petacci as Il maitre del 'Lapin Rouge'
- Massimo Pianforini as Un marchese
- Nietta Zocchi as Un' altra ragazza disoccupata

== Bibliography ==
- Ricci, Steven (2008). Cinema and Fascism: Italian Film and Society, 1922–1943. Berkeley: University of California Press. ISBN 978-0520253568.
