= Caterina Boratto =

Italian actress (1915–2010)

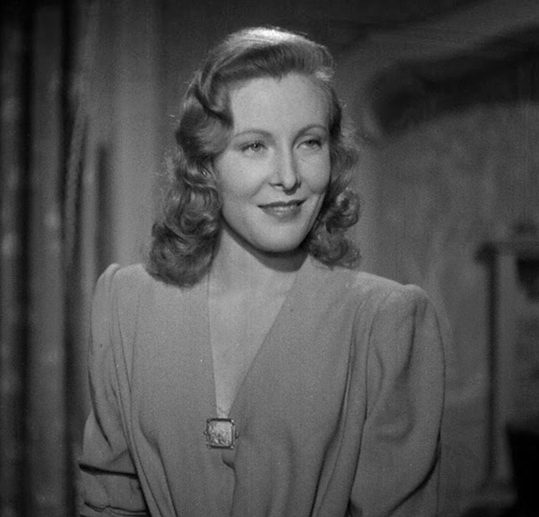
- Boratto in the movie The Peddler and the Lady (1943)
- Born: 15 March 1915; Turin, Kingdom of Italy
- Died: 14 September 2010 (aged 95); Rome, Italy
- Occupations: Actress; singer
- Years active: 1936–1993

Caterina Boratto (15 March 1915 – 14 September 2010) was an Italian film actress. She appeared in 50 films between 1936 and 1993.

== Life and career ==
Born in Turin, Boratto studied at the Musical Lyceum in her hometown with the purpose of becoming a singer; noted by Guido Brignone, she made her debut in To Live, alongside Tito Schipa. Thanks to the film's success, she immediately became a star in the Telefoni Bianchi genre and also got a seven-year contract with Metro-Goldwyn-Mayer which eventually dissolved because of World War II.

In 1943, Boratto lost two brothers, the partisan Renato and the soldier Filiberto, killed in the massacre of the Acqui Division. In 1944, she married a doctor, Armando Ceratto, with whom she had two children. Except for a film in 1951, she basically retired from show business for twenty years before accepting to play two key roles in 8½ and Juliet of the Spirits by Federico Fellini, who had known her in the set of The Peddler and the Lady, where he had served as screenwriter. Starting from the second half of the 1960s, Boratto resumed appearing in films with some regularity, and from the late 1970s, she also became very active on television, being cast in dozens of TV series.

== Filmography ==
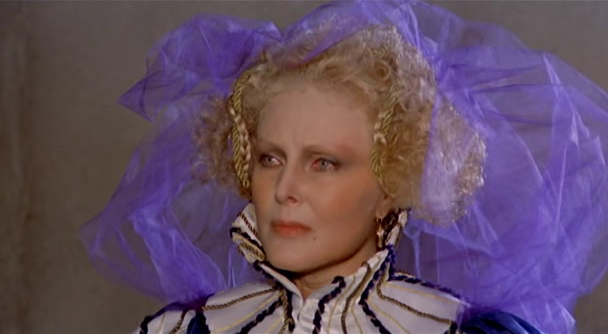
Boratto in Story of a Cloistered Nun (1973).

Year	Title	Role	Notes
1937	To Live	Paola – sua figlia	
1937	Marcella	Marcella	
1938	Chi è cchiu' felice 'e me!	Rina Carlo	
1938	They've Kidnapped a Man	La Granduchessa Sonia	
1939	The Sons of the Marquis Lucera	Giannina	
1942	Story of a Poor Young Man	Margherita	
1943	Measure for Measure	Isabella	
1943	The Peddler and the Lady	Elsa Bianchini	
1951	Double Cross	Clara Vanzetti	
1963	8½	La signora misteriosa	
1965	Juliet of the Spirits	Giulietta's mother	
1966	Me, Me, Me... and the Others	Luigia, Peppino's Sister-in-law	
1966	Pardon, Are You For or Against?	Agnese Frustalupi	
1967	Don't Sting the Mosquito	Marchioness Filangeri	
1967	The Tiger and the Pussycat	Delia	
1967	Stasera mi butto	Countess Eugenia	
1967	Pronto... c'è una certa Giuliana per te	Aunt Amelia	
1968	Danger: Diabolik	Lady Clark	
1969	The Lady of Monza	Sister Francesca Imbersaga	
1969	Castle Keep	Red Queen	
1970	Una storia d'amore	Marco's Mother	
1970	Angeli senza paradiso	Princess Vorokin	
1972	Hector the Mighty	Ecuba	
1972	The House of the Doves	Virginia	
1972	Lady Caroline Lamb		
1973	The Off-Road Girl	Silvia Marino	
1973	Story of a Cloistered Nun	Mother of Carmela	
1974	Summer to Remember	The Princess	
1975	Footprints on the Moon	Boutique Owner	
1975	Salò, or the 120 Days of Sodom	Signora Castelli	
1977	Per questa notte		
1978	First Love	Lucy	
1979	The House by the Edge of the Lake	Kira – witch by the lake	
1981	Uno contro l'altro, praticamente amici	Mamma di Franco Colombo	
1982	That Night in Varennes	Madame Faustine	
1982	Ehrengard	Countess von Gassner	
1984	Claretta	Giuseppina Petacci	
1985	Amici miei – Atto III	Amalia Pecci Bonetti	
1988	32 December	Carlotta Tricarico	(segment "La gialla farfalla")
1988	Phantom of Death	Robert's Mother	
1989	The Sleazy Uncle	Passante che aiuta Luca	
1992	Once Upon a Crime	Madame de Senneville	
