= La voce senza volto =

- Directed by: Gennaro Righelli
- Screenplay by: Corrado D'Errico; Aldo De Benedetti; Riccardo Freda; Ivo Perilli
- Story by: Corrado D'Errico
- Starring: Giovanni Manurita; Vanna Vanni; Elsa De Giorgi; Carlo Romano
- Cinematography: Domenico Scala
- Edited by: Gisa Radicchi Levi
- Music by: Cesare A. Bixio
- Production company: Juventus Film
- Distributed by: Juventus Film
- Release date: 5 January 1939 (Italy)
- Running time: 69 minutes
- Country: Italy

La voce senza volto (transl. The Faceless Voice) is a 1939 Italian "white-telephones" comedy film directed by Gennaro Righelli. It is part of the tradition of telefoni bianchi (transl. white telephone) comedies, popular in Italy at the time.

== Cast ==
Cast adapted from Riccardo Freda: The Life and Works of a Born Filmmaker.

- Giovanni Manurita as Gino Malversi
- Vanna Vanni as Mirella Bonardi
- Elsa De Giorgi as an actress
- Carlo Romano as Maurizio Sala, the tenore
- Romolo Costa as Riva, the film director
- Claudio Ermelli as Tabarrini
- Adele Garavaglia as Gino's mother
- Anita Farra as the Hostel owner
- Nietta Zocchi as the actress' maid

== Production ==
La voce senza volto was shot at the Cinecittà Studios. The film features Giovanni Manurita, a popular tenor who had a brief film career. La voce senza volto would be his third last film.

== Release ==
La voce senza volto was distributed theatrically in Italy by Juventus Film on January 5, 1939. Film historian and critic Roberto Curti noted that the current prints of the film in Italy suffer from soundtrack damage, and feature voice work that was re-dubbed onto the film with contemporary dialogue.
