= Ente Nazionale Industrie Cinematografiche =

Italian film company

Ente Nazionale Industrie Cinematografiche (ENIC) was an Italian film production and distribution entity that operated between 1935 and 1956.

It was formed in 1935, taking over the former organisation of Stefano Pittaluga and his Cines company. Supported by the Fascist regime, the company began to acquire cinemas, the company's holdings rising from 29 in 1935 to 94 in 1941. A major inspiration behind the company was the government's support of the growing Italian film industry. Consequently, in 1938, ENIC was given a monopoly over foreign films distributed in Italy. In response the Hollywood studios withdrew from the Italian market. This led to a major expansion in Italian film production in the following years.

== Bibliography ==
- Bondanella, Peter. A History of Italian Cinema. A&C Black, 2009
- Forgacs, David & Gundle Stephen. Mass Culture and Italian Society from Fascism to the Cold War. Indiana University Press, 2007.
- Reeves, Nicholas. Power of Film Propaganda. A&C Black, 2004.
- Reich, Jacqueline & Garofalo, Piero. Re-viewing Fascism: Italian Cinema, 1922-1943. Indiana University Press, 2002.
