= Matania (surname) =

Matania is a surname. Notable people with the surname include:

- Clelia Matania (1918–1981), Italian actress
- Edoardo Matania (1847–1929), Italian painter and illustrator
- Eviatar Matania (born 1966), Israeli professor and government official
- Fortunino Matania (1881–1963), Italian artist
- Shaul Matania (1937–2017), Israeli footballer
- Ugo Matania (1888–1963), Italian artist and illustrator

== See also ==
- Matania Anantapur railway station, a train station in West Bengal, India
