= Abiathar (name) =

Abiathar (Hebrew: אֶבְיָתָר, pronounced [ʔɛvjɔːˈθɔːr] ’Eḇyāṯār, "the father is great"), also spelled Eviatar or Evyatar pronounced [ʔevjaˈtaʁ] in Modern Hebrew, is a High Priest described in the Bible.

Later notable people with the name include:

== Abiathar ==
- Abiathar ben Elijah ha-Cohen (1040–1109), Palestinian Gaon
- Abiathar Crescas, Spanish-Jewish physician
- Charles Abiathar White (1826–1910), American geologist
- Clarence Abiathar Waldo (1852–1926), American mathematician
- Abiathar, Jewish priest of Mtskheta in Georgia who converted to Christianity alongside his daughter Sidonia

== Eviatar ==
- Eviatar Banai (born 1973), Israeli musician
- Eviatar Manor (born 1949), Israeli diplomat
- Eviatar Nevo (born 1929), Israeli professor
- Eviatar Zerubavel (born 1948), Israeli professor
- Eviatar Matania (born 1966), founder and Head of the Israel National Cyber Bureau

== Evyatar ==
- Evyatar Baruchyan (born 1989), Israeli footballer
- Evyatar Borovsky (1981–2013), Israeli, victim of the 2013 Tapuah Junction stabbing
- Evyatar Iluz (born 1983), Israeli footballer

== See also ==
- Evyatar, Israeli outpost, named after Evyatar Borovsky
- Abiathar Peak, Wyoming, US
