= Clelia Matania =

Italian actress (1918–1981)

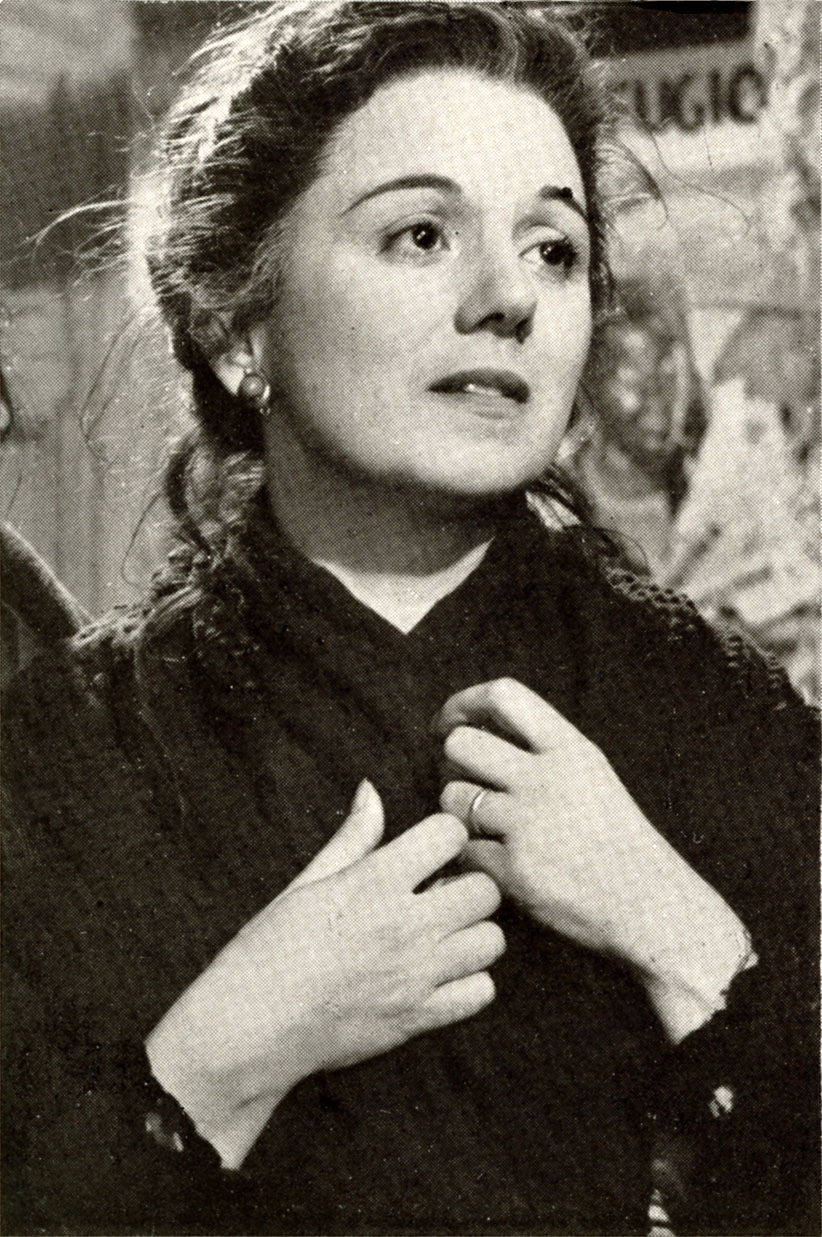
- Matania in 1952
- Born: 28 March 1918; London, England
- Died: 14 October 1981 (aged 63); Rome, Italy
- Occupation: Actress
- Spouse: Guido Odierna
- Father: Fortunino Matania
- Relatives: Edoardo Matania (grandfather); Alberto della Valle (granduncle); Ugo Matania (first cousin once removed)

Clelia Matania (28 March 1918 – 14 October 1981) was an Italian film and voice actress.

== Life and career ==
Born in London, the daughter of the Capri-born naturalized Briton painter Fortunino Matania (best known as Saturnino), Matania attended the Royal Academy of Dramatic Art and also followed courses of ballet, singing and music. When the family returned to Italy, she entered the company of the Arts Theater directed by Anton Giulio Bragaglia. In the second half of the thirties and during the war she was one of the most popular and requested young actresses of prose in Italy, then, from 1942, she also starred with some success in several revues. Her stage activity include works with Totò, Eduardo De Filippo and the musical comedy Enrico '61 that she also represented in England, first in Liverpool and then in London, also participating in a Royal Performance in the presence of the Royal Family.

Her film career mainly consists of supporting roles as a character actress; due to her perfect knowledge of English, Matania was also often required for the international productions set in Italy. She was also a very active voice actress.

Matania was married to painter Guido Odierna.

== Selected filmography ==
- Melody of My Heart (1936)
- Night Ride (1937) - Lucia Spinelli
- Departure (1938) - Lolò - la dattilografa
- Inventiamo l'amore (1938) - Elsa
- The Sons of the Marquis Lucera (1939) - Soave
- Naples Will Never Die (1939) - Rosinella
- Father For a Night (1939) - Luisa
- Follie del secolo (1939) - Margot, la cameriera
- The Silent Partner (1939)
- La compagnia della teppa (1941) - Carolina Agudio
- First Love (1941) - Silvia Redi
- La fuggitiva (1941) - Lia Coppi
- Honeymoon (1941) - Anna
- Se io fossi onesto (1942) - Paola Englesh, loro figlia
- A che servono questi quattrini? (1942) - Rachelina
- Perdizione (1942)
- After Casanova's Fashion (1942) - Maria Grazia
- Notte di fiamme (1942)
- Sempre più difficile (1943) - Cristina Turrisi
- L'ippocampo (1945) - Francesca
- Romulus and the Sabines (1945) - Rosina
- Il marito povero (1946) - Giulia
- Farewell, My Beautiful Naples (1946) - Yvonne de Fleurette
- L'isola del sogno (1947) - Carla, la soubrette
- Giudicatemi! (1948)
- Eleven Men and a Ball (1948) - Clelia
- Alarm Bells (1949) - Bianca
- Angelo tra la folla (1950)
- The Transporter (1950) - Dolores Garcia
- Strano appuntamento (1950)
- Love and Blood (1951) - Gabriella
- Shadows Over Naples (1951) - Gabriela
- Seven Hours of Trouble (1951) - Angelina - moglie di Totò
- Quo Vadis (1951) - Parmenida (uncredited)
- Stasera sciopero (1951) - Marta
- Never Take No for an Answer (1951) - Mrs. Strotti
- One Hundred Little Mothers (1952) - La direttrice Sampieri
- Toto and the Women (1952) - La cameriera
- I morti non pagano tasse (1952) - La signora Vecchietti
- Terminal Station (1953) - Mother of annoying children (uncredited)
- Man, Beast and Virtue (1953) - Grazia
- Easy Years (1953) - Rosina De Francesco
- Cavallina storna (1953)
- The Beach (1954) - Albertocchi's Wife
- Guai ai vinti (1954) -Teresa
- Neapolitan Carousel (1955)
- Les Hussards (1955) - Mme Luppi
- I pinguini ci guardano (1956) - (voice)
- I giorni più belli (1956) - La signora Valentini
- War and Peace (1956) - Mademoiselle Geoges (uncredited)
- Difendo il mio amore (1956) - Emma
- Wives and Obscurities (1956) - Signora Zanarini
- Roland the Mighty (1956) - La nutrice
- The Monte Carlo Story (1956) - Sophia
- Mamma sconosciuta (1956) - Giuliana
- Cantando sotto le stelle (1956) - Fernando Pezzetti
- Seven Hills of Rome (1957) - Beatrice
- A Farewell to Arms (1957) - Hairdresser (uncredited)
- Napoli, sole mio! (1958) - Margherita
- Anna of Brooklyn (1958) - Camillina
- La Fortuna Con L'effe Maiuscola (1959)
- Il Medico Dei Pazzi (1959)
- Rapina al quartiere Ovest (1960)
- La garçonnière (1960) - Angelina
- The Wastrel (1961) - Betsy
- Five Golden Hours (1961) - Rosalia
- Il carabiniere a cavallo (1961) - La madre di Letizia
- Queen of the Nile (1961) - Penaba
- Pecado de amor (1961) - Sirvienta de Magda
- Escapade in Florence (1962, TV Series) - Aunt Gisella
- The Battle of the Villa Fiorita (1965) - Celestina
- Perdono (1966) - Adelina
- Nessuno mi può giudicare (1966) - Adelina
- Chimera (1968) - Lina - the maid
- The Tough and the Mighty (1969) - Graziano's Mother
- The Secret of Santa Vittoria (1969)
- Just Before Nightfall (1971) - Mme Masson
- Bequest to the Nation (1973) - Francesca
- Don't Look Now (1973) - Wendy
- I'll Take Her Like a Father (1974) - Elisa
- Vergine e di nome Maria (1975) - Anna, madre di Maria
- Wanted: Babysitter (1975) - Old neighbour
- L'Italia s'è rotta (1976) - La madre di Peppe
- Bim Bum Bam (1981)
