= Alberto della Valle =

Italian illustrator (1951–1928)

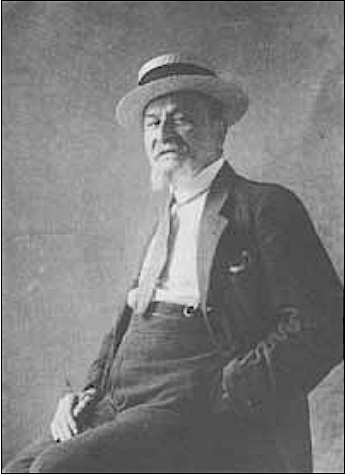
- Born: 3 April 1851; Naples, Kingdom of the Two Sicilies
- Died: 24 December 1928 (aged 77); Naples, Kingdom of Italy
- Known for: Poster art; graphic design; illustrations for Emilio Salgari
- Movement: Liberty style
- Spouse: Maria Cobianchi (m. 1900; died 1909)
- Relatives: Edoardo Matania (brother-in-law); Fortunino Matania (nephew); Clelia Matania (grandniece)

Signature
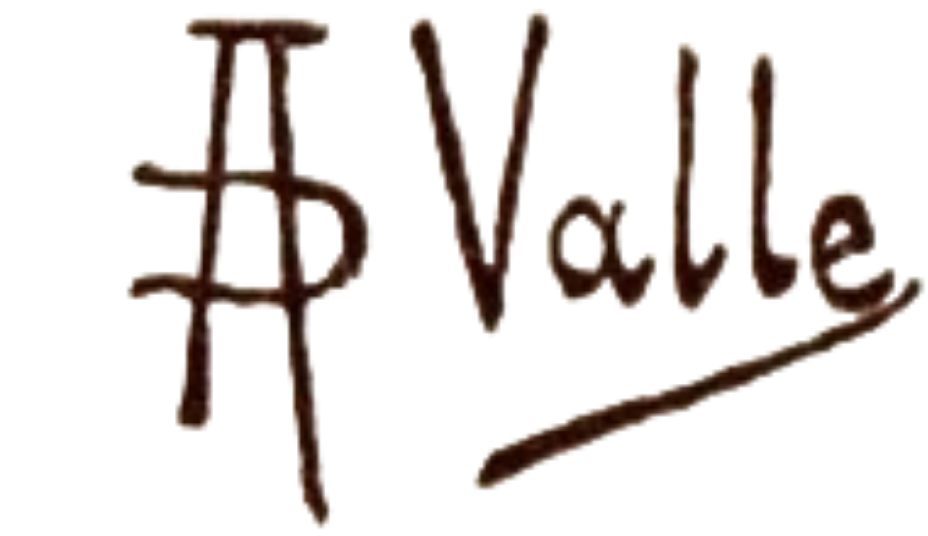

Alberto della Valle (3 April 1851 – 24 December 1928) was an Italian draftsman and illustrator. He is best known as one of the primary illustrators of Emilio Salgari's novels.

== Career ==
Born in Naples to a colonel in the Army of the Two Sicilies, he abandoned a military career to pursue painting and drawing after being introduced to art by his brother-in-law, the painter Edoardo Matania. Matania introduced him to the Milanese publisher Emilio Treves (1834–1916), who employed him from 1880 onwards to work on the weekly magazine L'Illustrazione Italiana.

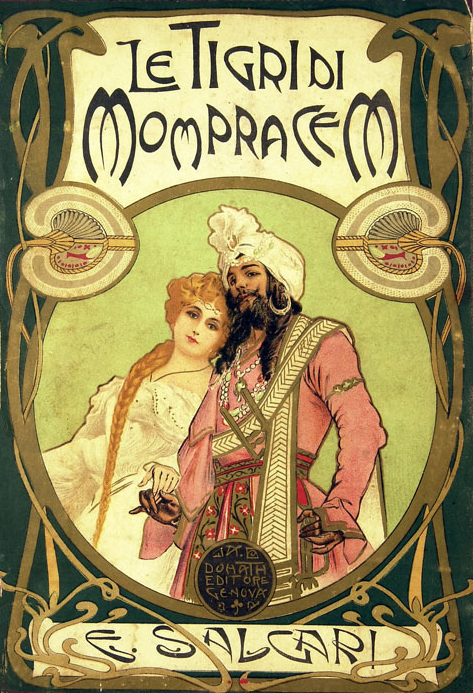
Liberty-style cover the first edition of Salgari's The Tigers of Mompracem (Genoa, Donath, 1900).

He then settled in Genoa, becoming best known to the general public as the illustrator of over 21 adventure novels by Emilio Salgari. These novels sold hundreds of thousands of copies in late 19th-century Italy and later throughout Europe. Initially employed by the Genoese publisher Alberto Donath, he then worked for Bemporad in Florence from 1907 onwards. Della Valle assisted the illustrator Giuseppe Garuti. Together with Gamba and Gennaro d'Amato, he formed a trio of illustrators who worked mostly for Salgari.

Della Valle's illustrations were reproduced in numerous periodicals, including La Domenica dei Fanciulli, La Via Azzurra, Il Giornale Illustrato dei Viaggi, La Domenica Illustrata and Il Mattino Illustrato.

== Personal life and death ==
In 1900, della Valle married Maria Cobianchi, heiress to a hotel chain, and returned to Naples with her. However, following her death from a painful illness in 1909, he descended into a deep depression. On 24 December 1928, in Naples, della Valle ended his life by shooting himself in the head.

== Selected lithographs ==
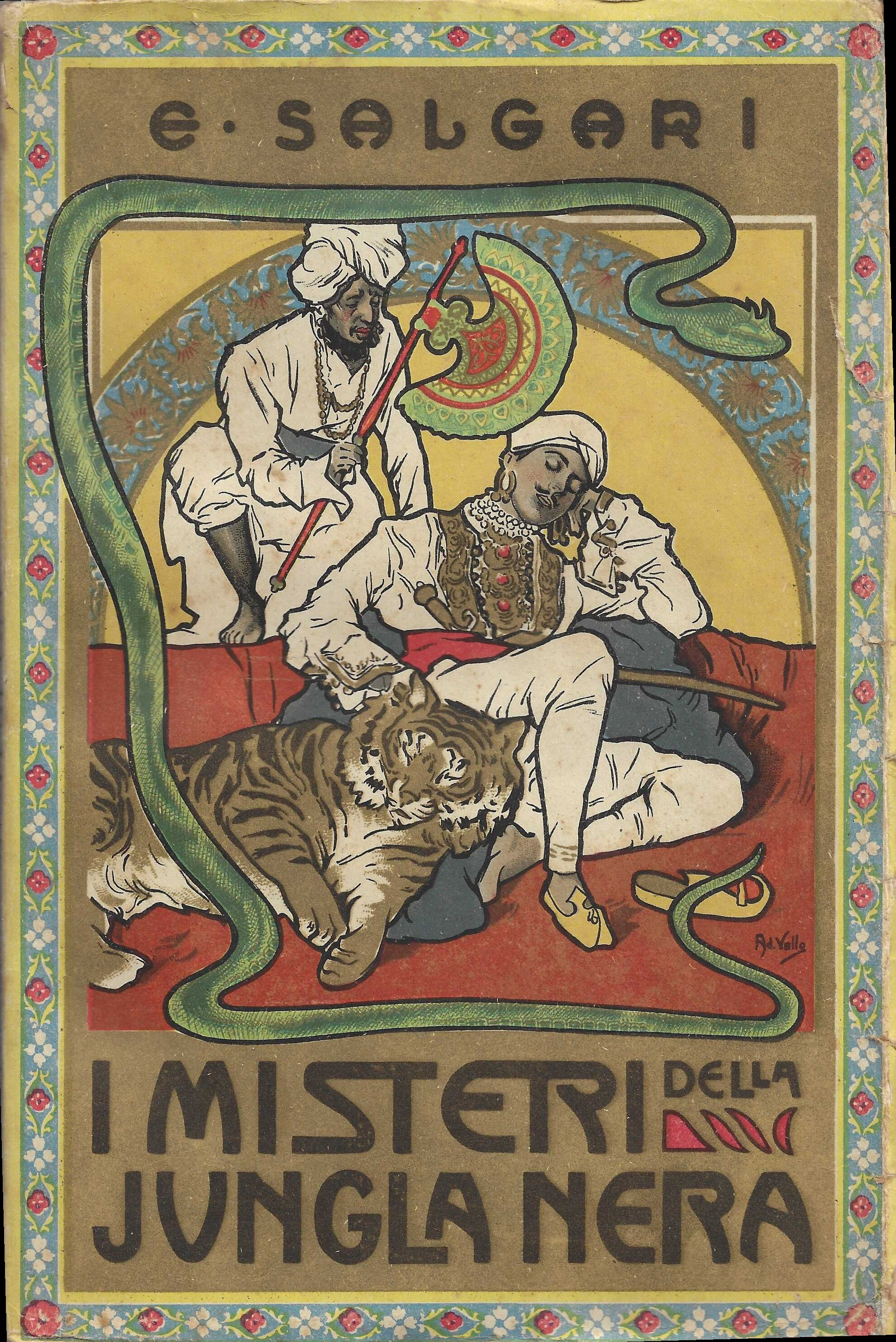
Cover image from The Mystery of the Black Jungle by Emilio Salgari, 1887

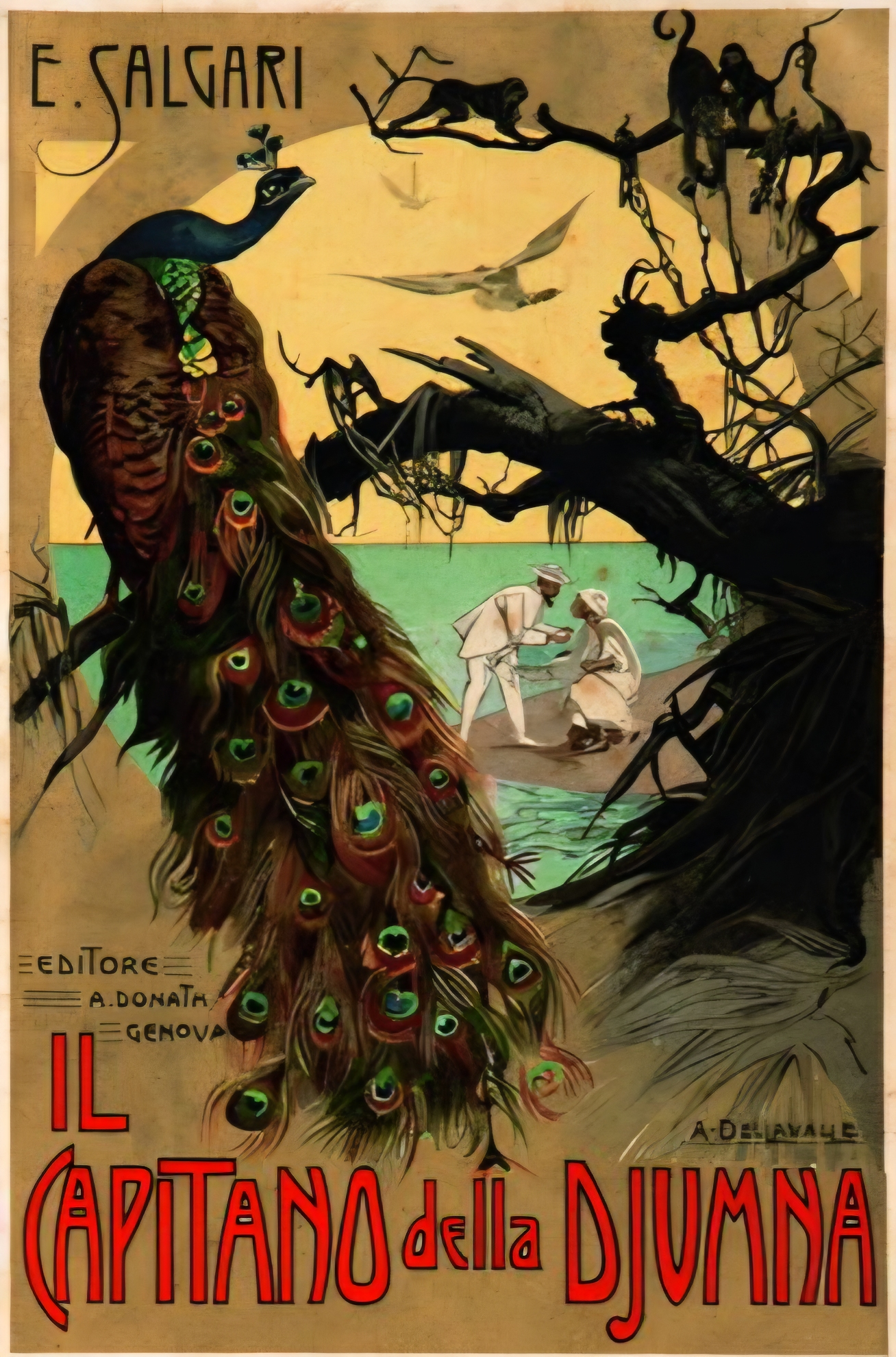
Cover image from Il capitano della Djumna by Emilio Salgari, 1897.

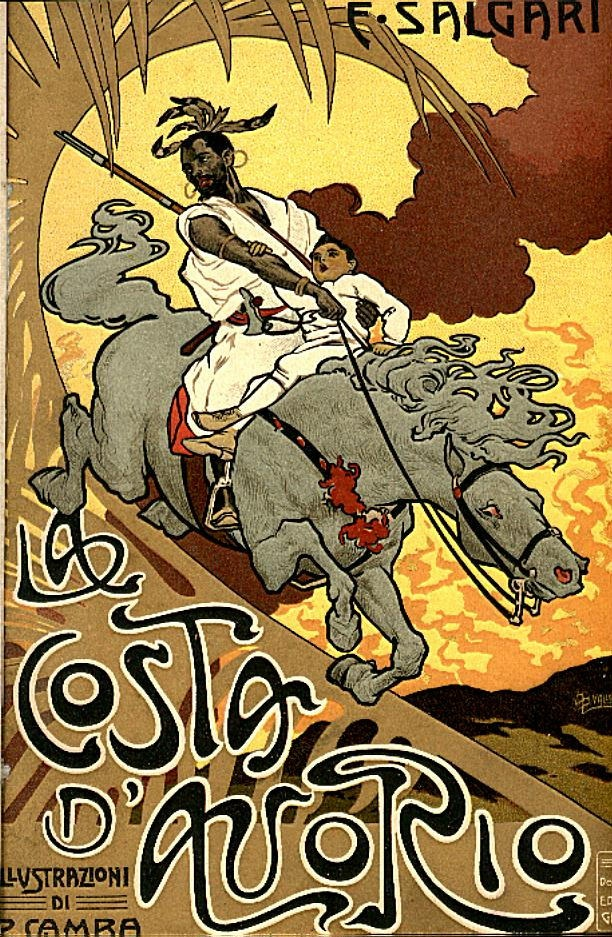
Cover image from La Costa d'Avorio by Emilio Salgari, 1898.

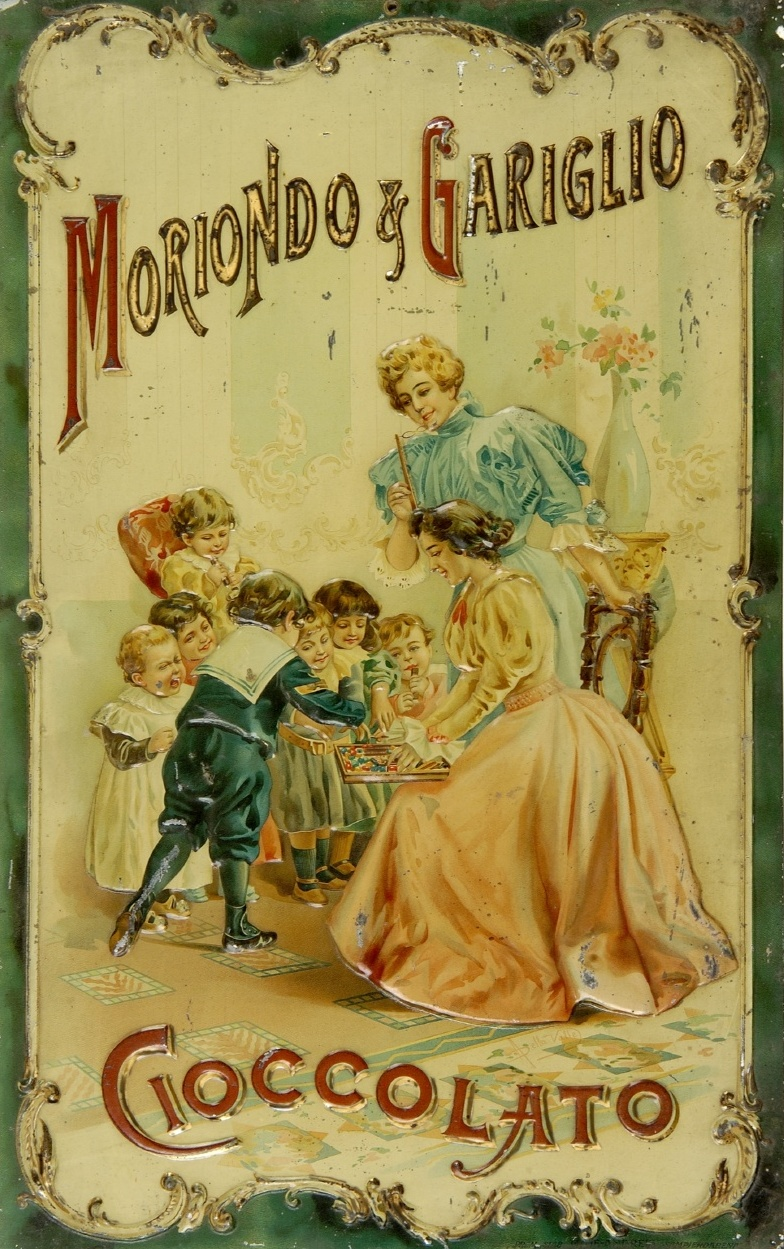
Poster by Alberto della Valle for Moriondo & Gariglio, 1900s.

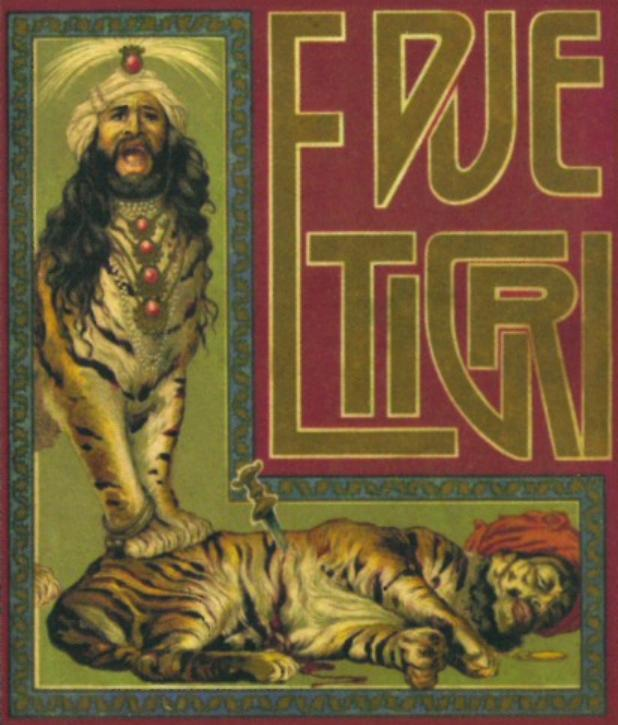
Cover image from Le due tigri by Emilio Salgari, 1904.

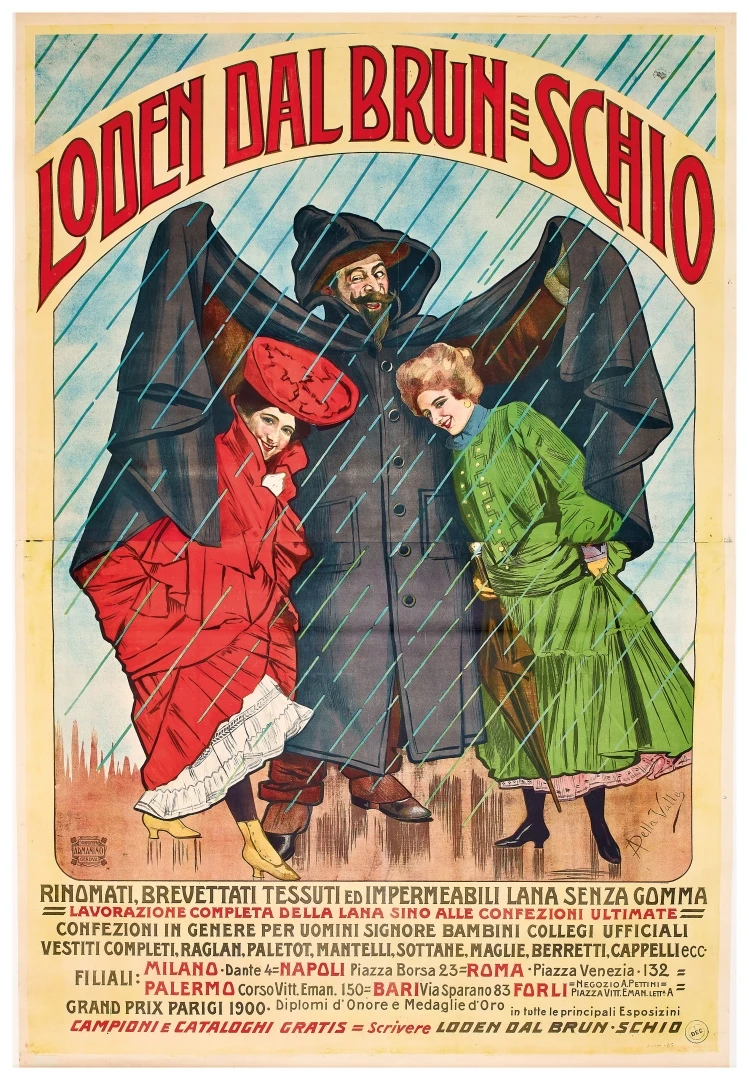
Poster by Alberto della Valle for loden dal Brun, 1905.

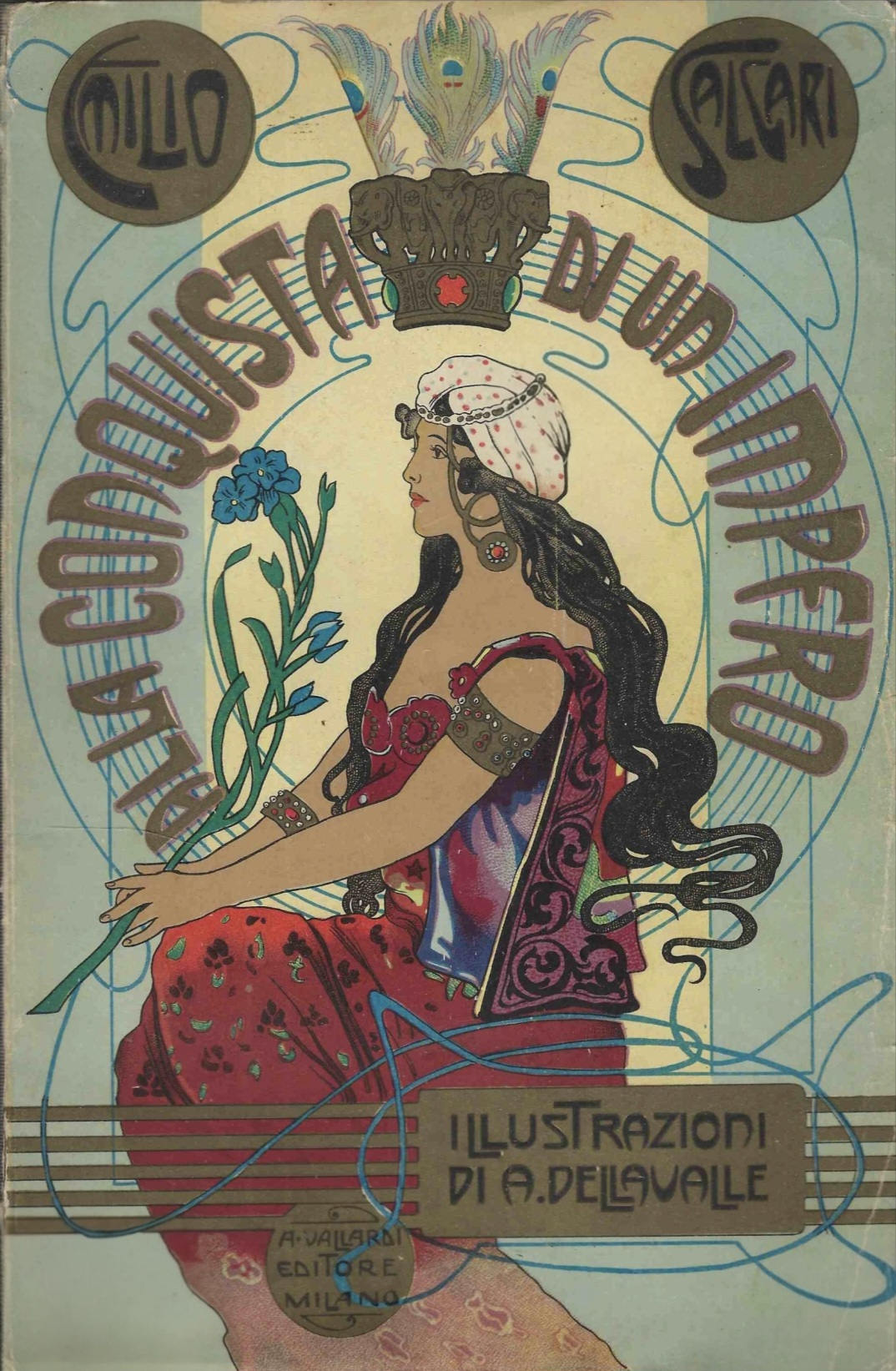
Cover image from Quest for a Throne by Emilio Salgari, 1907.

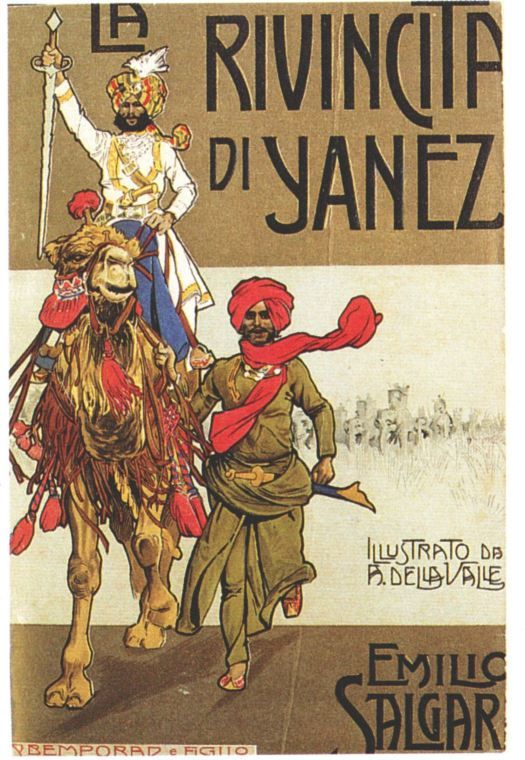
Cover image from La rivincita di Yanez by Emilio Salgari, 1913.

== Bibliography ==
- Pallottino, Paola. L'occhio della tigre. Alberto della Valle fotografo e illustratore salgariano (in Italian). Palermo: Sellerio Editore. ISBN 978-8876810909.
