= Diego Pozzetto =

Italian stage and film actor

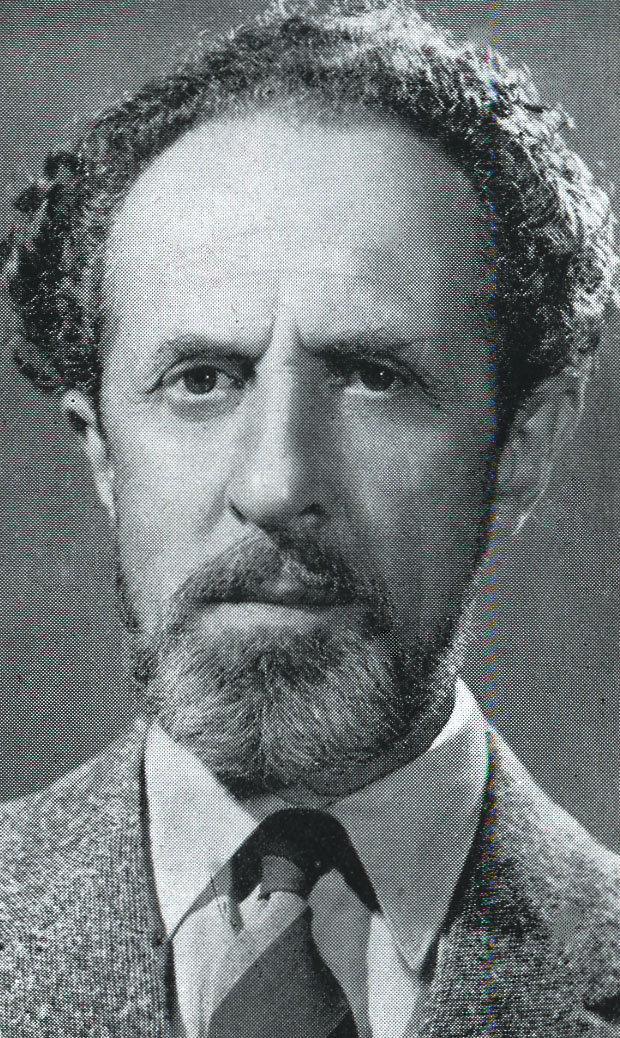
- Born: 18 April 1893; Trieste, Austria-Hungary
- Died: Unknown
- Occupation: Actor
- Years active: 1937-1964 (film)

Diego Pozzetto was an Italian stage and film actor.

== Selected filmography ==
- Bertoldo, Bertoldino e Cacasenno (1937)
- Nina non far la stupida (1937)
- Il conte di Brechard (1938)
- The Black Corsair (1938)
- L'argine (1938) - (uncredited)
- Star of the Sea (1938)
- Marionetes (1939) - (uncredited)
- Tre fratelli in gamba (1939)
- Guest for One Night (1939) - Mattia
- Men on the Sea Floor (1941) - (uncredited)
- Fatal Symphony (1947)
- Se fossi deputato (1949)
- Margaret of Cortona (1950)
- Cavalcade of Heroes (1950)
- Angelo tra la folla (1950)
- Feathers in the Wind (1950)
- Love and Blood (1951) - Il storpio
- Shadows Over Naples (1951) - Der Behinderte
- Trieste mia! (1951)
- Maschera nera (1951)
- When in Rome (1952) - Bearded Priest (uncredited)
- Prisoner in the Tower of Fire (1953) - Frate Raimondo
- Südliche Nächte (1953)
- Disonorata - Senza colpa (1954)
- Disowned (1954)
- Vecchio cinema... che passione! (1957)
- Aphrodite, Goddess of Love (1958) - Frantic Old Man (uncredited)
- Avventura nell'arcipelago (1958) - Professore Bellini
- Herod the Great (1959)
- Il cavaliere senza terra (1959)
- Head of a Tyrant (1959)
- Il mondo dei miracoli (1959)
- Ben-Hur (1959) - Villager (uncredited)
- Ursus in the Land of Fire (1963)
- The Last Gun (1964) - Noah
- Hercules and the Tyrants of Babylon (1964) - Bomar - Babylonian Commander (final film role)

== Bibliography ==
- Roberto Chiti & Roberto Poppi. Dizionario del cinema italiano: Dal 1945 al 1959. Gremese Editore, 1991.
