= Love and Blood =

1951 film

- French film poster
- Directed by: Marino Girolami
- Written by: Gino De Santis; Ernst Marischka; Paola Ojetti
- Produced by: William A. Szekeley
- Starring: Maria Montez; Alan Curtis
- Cinematography: Anchise Brizzi
- Edited by: Loris Bellero
- Music by: Renzo Rossellini
- Production companies: A. B. Film; Comedia-Film; La Quercia Produzione Film
- Release date: 5 April 1951
- Running time: 86 minutes
- Countries: Italy; West Germany
- Language: Italian

Love and Blood (Italian: Amore e sangue) is a 1951 Italian-German crime melodrama film directed by Marino Girolami and starring Maria Montez in one of her last roles. It was also known as City of Violence. The film's art direction was by Max Mellin and Rolf Zehetbauer.

A separate German-language version Shadows Over Naples was also made, directed by Hans Wolff.

== Cast ==
- Maria Montez as Dolores
- Massimo Serato as Peppuccio
- Hans Söhnker as Marco, capo camorra
- Carlo Giustini as Paolo
- Mirella Uberti as Nennella
- Folco Lulli as Pietro
- Andrea Checchi
- Josef Meinrad as Otto
- Vittorio De Sosti
- Alan Curtis
- Pina Piovani
- Dina Romano
- Riccardo Valente
- Diego Pozzetto
- Dario Michaelis
- Siegfried Breuer
- Pasquale Fasciano as Ercole
- Liana Del Balzo
- Petra Peters
- Clelia Matania
- Otto Wernicke
- Domenico Baiardo
- Viktor Afritsch
- Ursula Herking
- Anita Angius
- Ernst Rotmund
- Giulio Battiferri

== Bibliography ==
- Bock, Hans-Michael; Bergfelder, Tim, eds. (2009). The Concise Cinegraph: Encyclopaedia of German Cinema. New York: Berghahn Books. ISBN 978-1-57181-655-9.
