= Shadows Over Naples =

1951 film

- Directed by: Hans Wolff
- Written by: Gino De Santis; Ernst Marischka; Paola Ojetti
- Produced by: Heinz Rühmann; Herbert Sennewald
- Starring: Maria Montez; Massimo Serato; Hans Söhnker
- Cinematography: Anchise Brizzi
- Edited by: Hermann Leitner
- Music by: Renzo Rossellini
- Production companies: A. B. Film; Comedia-Film
- Distributed by: National-Film
- Release date: 20 April 1951
- Running time: 86 minutes
- Countries: Italy; West Germany
- Language: German

Shadows Over Naples (German: Schatten über Neapel) is a 1951 German-Italian crime film directed by Hans Wolff and starring Maria Montez, Massimo Serato, and Hans Söhnker. A separate Italian version, Love and Blood, was also released.

== Cast ==
- Maria Montez as Dolores
- Massimo Serato as Peppuccio
- Hans Söhnker as Marco, capo Camorra
- Carlo Giustini as Paolo
- Mirella Uberti as Nennella
- Folco Lulli as Pietro
- Andrea Checchi
- Josef Meinrad as Otto Schulz
- Vittorio De Sosti
- Alan Curtis as Paolo
- Pina Piovani
- Dina Romano
- Riccardo Valente
- Diego Pozzetto
- Dario Michaelis
- Siegfried Breuer as Präfekt
- Pasquale Fasciano as Ercole
- Liana Del Balzo
- Petra Peters as Nanella
- Clelia Matania as Gabriela
- Otto Wernicke as Pietro
- Domenico Baiardo
- Viktor Afritsch as Kassierer
- Ursula Herking as Guiletta
- Anita Angius
- Ernst Rotmund as Kommissar
- Giulio Battiferri

== Bibliography ==
- Bock, Hans-Michael; Bergfelder, Tim, eds. (2009). The Concise Cinegraph: Encyclopaedia of German Cinema. New York: Berghahn Books. ISBN 978-1-57181-655-9.
