= Angelo tra la folla =

- Directed by: Leonardo de Mitri
- Music by: Gino Filippini
- Distributed by: Variety Distribution
- Release date: 1950
- Running time: 90 minutes
- Country: Italy
- Language: Italian

Angelo tra la folla ("Angel in the Crowd") is a 1950 Italian film directed by Leonardo de Mitri.

The protagonist of the film is Angelo Maggio, the first Afro-Italian child actor to establish himself in post-war Italian cinema, after the experience of the little Somali-Italian Ali Ibrahim Sidali in fascist colonial cinema. Abandoned at birth, Angelo had been adopted by the actor Dante Maggio and had already signalled himself in the film Il mulatto (1950) in the role of a black boy struggling with the prejudices of his environment.

== Plot ==
Angelo is a mulatto orphan child, raised in Ciampino in a nuns' institute. One day he gets on a van that takes him to Rome. After a series of meetings, he is helped by Sora Rosa, a fruit seller, who takes him to her house. While Angelo remains alone at home, a murder is committed in the neighbouring apartment, of which he is the only witness. The police unjustly accuse Pietro, son of Sora Rosa, of the murder. The child escapes and is hit by a car, driven by the owner of an appointment house; when the police arrive, the little one continues to flee until the real killer is arrested.

== Cast ==
- Angelo Maggio ... Angelo
- Umberto Spadaro ... La Spada
- Isa Pola ... Countess Melitta
- Luisella Beghi ... Sister Luisa
- Lia Murano... Ninuccia
- Aldo Capacci ... Pietro
- Nino Milano ... Bruno
- Maria Parisi ... Sora Rosa
- Ugo De Pascale ... Goldstein
- Desiderio Nobile ... Blumfield
- Silvio Bagolini ... Cavaliere Bartolozzi
- Oscar Andriani ... Cmdr. Petroni
- Anna Silena ... Sister Beatrice
- Edoardo Toniolo ... Flores
- Giovanna Galletti ... Giocatrice
- Lora Silvani ... a waitress
- Armando Annuale
- Marina Bonfigli
- Lia Corelli
- Greta Mandrà
- Clelia Matania
- Melia Mataura
- Diego Pozzetto
- Sergio Raimondi (actor)
- Adalberto Romi
- Diana Veneziani
- Ettore Vincelli
- Anna Vita
