= Feathers in the Wind (1950 film) =

- Directed by: Ugo Amadoro
- Written by: Ugo Amadoro; Stefano Canzio; Fabrizio Taglioni
- Produced by: Tullio Bucci
- Starring: Leonardo Cortese; Olga Gorgoni; Mario Ferrari
- Cinematography: Bitto Albertini
- Edited by: Giuseppe Vari
- Music by: Alberto De Castello
- Production company: Bucci
- Release date: 17 December 1950
- Country: Italy
- Language: Italian

Feathers in the Wind (Italian: Piume al vento) is a 1950 Italian drama film directed by Ugo Amadoro and starring Leonardo Cortese, Olga Gorgoni and Mario Ferrari.

The film's sets were designed by Vittorio Valentini.

== Cast ==
- Leonardo Cortese as Stefano
- Olga Gorgoni as Marta Flores
- Mario Ferrari as Frassoni
- Dante Maggio as Gennaro
- Peter Trent as cap. Von Toeplitz
- Silvio Bagolini
- Diego Pozzetto
- Renato Malavasi
- Nico Pepe
- Enzo Cerusico as Little patriot
- Giorgio Costantini
- Viviane Vallé
- Cristina Velvet as Anna Frassoni

== Bibliography ==
- Giulio Martini. I luoghi del cinema. Touring Club Italiano, 2005.
