= Hercules and the Tyrants of Babylon =

- A promotional film poster for "Hercules and the Tyrants of Babylon."
- Directed by: Domenico Paolella
- Written by: Domenico PaolellaLuciano Martino
- Produced by: Fortunato Misiano
- Starring: Peter Lupus (as Rock Stevens); Helga Liné; Mario Petri
- Cinematography: Augusto Tiezzi
- Edited by: Jolanda Benvenuti
- Music by: Angelo Francesco Lavagnino
- Production company: Romana Film
- Distributed by: Cosmopolis Films et les Films Marbeuf; American International Pictures (US)
- Release date: 1964
- Running time: 86 min.
- Country: Italy
- Language: Italian

Ercole contro i tiranni di Babilonia (English Translation: Hercules and the Tyrants of Babylon) is a 1964 Italian sword-and-sandal film directed by Domenico Paolella and starring Peter Lupus (credited as Rock Stevens) as Hercules.

== Plot ==
Asparia, Queen of the Hellenes, has been captured by the Babylonians, but she manage to hide her identity and lives as a common slave in Babylon. Hercules is sent to free her. The Babylonian slavers begin to hear rumors and stories of a single man who can overcome any army he faces. Asparia conspires with another slave to send a message of her whereabouts to Hercules, who soon is heading towards Babylon.

The three siblings who rule Babylon—beautiful Taneal, warlike Salman Osar and more conservative Azzur—are visited by King Phaleg of Assyria. Phaleg showers the three with gifts, offering up untold riches in exchange for all of the slaves in Babylon. The siblings are suspicious of Phaleg's motives, thinking he means to raise an army from the slaves. Taneal seduces and drugs the Assyrian king, discovering that he intends to find Queen Asparia and marry her, creating a powerful empire of Assyria and Hellas. The siblings agree to stop this, and send troops to ambush the king. Hercules discovers the plan and aids the Assyrians, as the Babylonians are his enemy, and saves the life of the king. Phaleg makes Hercules take a loyalty oath, and then sends him to Babylon, along with several of his men, to retrieve Asparia.

In Babylon, each of the siblings is conspiring against the other; Salman Osar and Azzur both wish to marry Asparia and form an empire, while Taneal intends to steal the wealth of the city and then destroy it by the means of a giant subterranean wheel which supports the foundation of all Babylon. Hercules is able to locate Asparia, and then begins to turn the giant wheel and destroy the city. Salman Osar kills his brother, then is crushed by falling debris while attempting to kill his sister. As Hercules' Assyrian escorts attempt to steal Asparia away to Phaleg, Taneal takes the Queen hostage herself. Phaleg and his large contingent of cavalry ride in to claim his new bride, but they are met by Hercules as well as the freed Babylonian slaves. Phaleg is killed by Hercules, and his soldiers routed; Taneal seemingly poisons herself rather than face the judgement of Hercules and Asparia. In the end, Hercules leads Asparia and the Hellenes back to their homeland.

== Cast ==
- Peter Lupus as Hercules (as Rock Stevens)
- Anna-Maria Polani as Asparia, queen of Hellenes
- Helga Liné as Taneal
- Mario Petri as Phaleg, king of Assyrians
- Livio Lorenzon as Salmanassar
- Tullio Altamura as Azzur
- Franco Balducci as Moksor
- Rosy De Leo as slave Gilda
- Andrea Scotti as a young shepherd
- Diego Pozzetto as Behar
- Mirko Valentin as Glicon
- Diego Michelotti as Crissipos
- Eugenio Bottai as Minister of Assur
- Emilio Messina as warrior
- Pietro Torrisi as warrior
- Gilberto Galimberti as warrior
- Amerigo Santarelli as warrior
- Puccio Ceccarelli as warrior

== Reception ==
The Lexicon of International Films describes the work as a "trivial sandal film based on common patterns that carefree mixes poetry and (historical) truth".

The magazine Cinema rated the film as a respectable spectacle and as upscale trash with entertainment value.

== See also ==
- Sword and sandal
- List of films featuring Hercules
- List of films in the public domain in the United States
