= Church of Maria Santissima del Carmine, Castellammare di Stabia =

Church building in Campania, Italy

Coordinates: 40°42′00″N 14°29′01″E

The Church of Maria Santissima del Carmine is a parish church in the Italian town of Castellammare di Stabia. Its parish is also served by the church of San Francesco Saverio.

== History ==
The first church on the site was begun in 1870 and consecrated two years later. A violent flood in the city in 1935 damaged that building, which was completely restored in 1937, the same year as it was made a parish church. In 1977 that building was demolished and a new one quickly built on the site.

== Design ==
The facade is divided in two by an entablature. The lower part is larger and divided into three parts by lesenes, each with an entrance door and two small windows flanking a central larger one. The upper part is solely made up of a lantern and ends in a tympanum. The bell tower is also part of the facade.

The interior is a single large space with a mezzanine on the south side to house worshippers. The red travertine high altar bears a 19th-century oil on canvas painting of Our Lady of Mount Carmel and a 1978 silver tabernacle showing the Holy Family. The artworks in the church itself and other parish buildings include two 1978 mosaic crystal stained glass windows of the Holy Spirit and the Eucharist by Salvatore Raino, fourteen Stations of the Cross by Ugo Matania, a 19th-century wooden statue of Saint Catellus and a painting of the Mystic Marriage of Saint Catherine by Andrea Vaccaro.
