= Liana Del Balzo =

Italian actress (1899–1982)

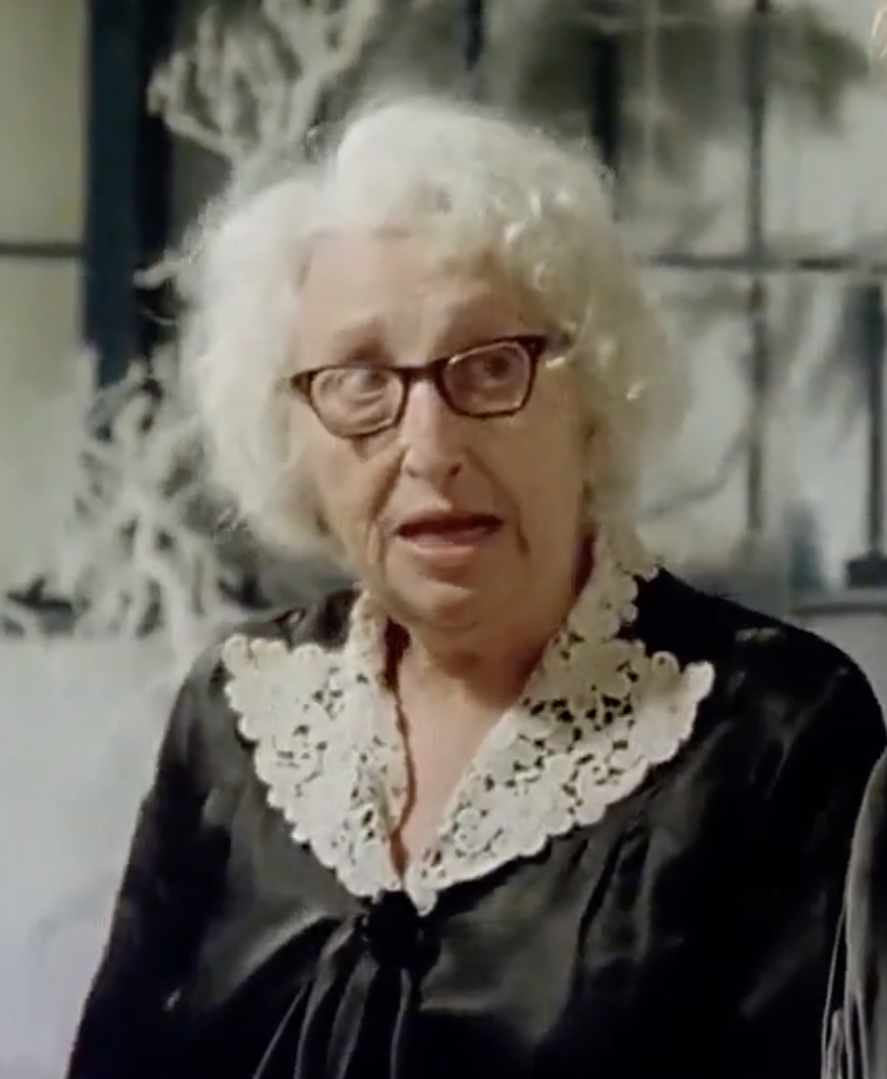
- Del Balzo in the movie Deep Red (1975)
- Born: 4 March 1899; Buenos Aires, Argentina
- Died: 26 March 1982 (aged 83); Rome, Italy
- Occupation: Actress
- Years active: 1935–1979

Liana Del Balzo (4 March 1899 – 26 March 1982) was an Italian film actress. She appeared in 90 films between 1935 and 1979. She was born in Buenos Aires, Argentina, and died in Rome, Italy. Even making her film debut quite late, in her forty, Del Balzo was one of the most active character actresses in the Italian cinema, usually cast in humorous roles. She was also active on stage and in the operetta, in which she met her husband-to-be, the tenor Guido Agnoletti.

== Selected filmography ==
- Casta Diva (1935)
- A Wife in Danger (1939) - Una invitata alla festa di nozze
- The Dream of Butterfly (1939)
- We Were Seven Widows (1939) - Passenger
- It Always Ends That Way (1939) - La cameriera dell' albergo
- Torna, caro ideal! (1939) - Madame de Villet
- The Boarders at Saint-Cyr (1939) - L'insegnante di musica
- Ballo al castello (1939)
- Scandalo per bene (1940)
- One Hundred Thousand Dollars (1940) - Miss Vernon
- Kean (1940) - Una invitata al ballo
- La canzone rubata (1940) - La portinaia
- La fanciulla di Portici (1940) - La duchessa Carafa
- Idyll in Budapest (1941)
- Tosca (1941) - La dama di compagnia della marchesa (uncredited)
- Caravaggio (1941)
- Orizzonte dipinto (1941)
- I mariti (Tempesta d'anime) (1941)
- The King's Jester (1941) - La marchesa che nasconde l'età
- A Woman Has Fallen (1941) - Una vicina di casa
- Sancta Maria (1942) - Una passeggera sulla nave
- Soltanto un bacio (1942) - Un invitata alla festa di fidanzamento
- The Princess of Dreams (1942) - Una amica della cantante lirica
- Miliardi, che follia! (1942) - Una invitata alla festa
- La signorina (1942)
- Sette anni di felicità (1942) - La cantante sul camion
- The Woman of Sin (1942)
- Harlem (1942)
- La danza del fuoco (1943)
- Sempre più difficile (1943) - La direttrice del collegio svizzero
- Apparition (1943) - Susanna, la governante
- La storia di una capinera (1943)
- The Devil Goes to Boarding School (1944) - Signora Testones
- Eugênia Grandet (1946)
- L'apocalisse (1947)
- Cab Number 13 (1948) - (segment "Il castigo")
- Toto Looks For a House (1949) - La contessa (uncredited)
- The Pirates of Capri (1949) - Minor Role (uncredited)
- Santo disonore (1950) - Minor Role (uncredited)
- Romanzo d'amore (1950) - Guest at the Continis'
- The Thief of Venice (1950) - La duenna
- Strano appuntamento (1950)
- Love and Blood (1951)
- Shadows Over Naples (1951)
- The Ungrateful Heart (1951)
- Seven Hours of Trouble (1951) - Donna Lucrezia (uncredited)
- Quo Vadis (1951) - Minor Role (uncredited)
- Una bruna indiavolata! (1951) - Mamma di Giulio
- Wife for a Night (1952)
- In Olden Days (1952) - Spettatrice al processo (segment "Il processo di Frine") (uncredited)
- Don Lorenzo (1952)
- Finishing School (1952) - Princess De Vick-Beranger
- Il romanzo della mia vita (1952) - The Woman in Trattoria (uncredited)
- Una donna prega (1953) - Una vicina curiosa
- Verdi (1953) - (uncredited)
- Neapolitan Carousel (1954) - Minor Role (uncredited)
- I cavalieri della regina (1954)
- Beautiful but Dangerous (1955) - (uncredited)
- Bravissimo (1955)
- Noi siamo le colonne (1956) - Madre di Sofia
- Valeria ragazza poco seria (1958)
- Le cameriere (1959)
- The Moralist (1959) - The Baroness (uncredited)
- Ben-Hur (1959) - Guest at Banquet (uncredited)
- The Cossacks (1960) - Grandduchess, Aunt of Tsar (uncredited)
- The Dam on the Yellow River (1960)
- The Night They Killed Rasputin (1960)
- Toto, Fabrizi and the Young People Today (1960)
- It Started in Naples (1960) - Minor Role (uncredited)
- Five Golden Hours (1961) - Minor Role (uncredited)
- Come September (1961) - Mother Superior (uncredited)
- I masnadieri (1961) - Acilia (uncredited)
- Sodom and Gomorrah (1962) - Rich Hebrew Woman
- Imperial Venus (1962) - Principessa Borghese
- La donna degli altri è sempre più bella (1963) - Old Lady on the Beach (segment "Bagnino Lover") (uncredited)
- I gemelli del Texas (1964) - Madre di Makenzie
- Il disco volante (1964) - la madre di Dolores
- The Taming of the Shrew (1967) - Minor Role (uncredited)
- Zorro alla corte d'Inghilterra (1969) - Woman at party (uncredited)
- Giacomo Casanova: Childhood and Adolescence (1969) - Woman attending sermon (uncredited)
- Shango (1970) - Taña
- Mr. Superinvisible (1970)
- Cross Current (1971) - Mrs. Foschi
- Colpo grosso... grossissimo... anzi probabile (1972)
- Novelle galeotte d'amore (1972)
- Indian Summer (1972) - Signora Dominici, Daniele's mother (uncredited)
- Il gatto di Brooklyn aspirante detective (1973) - Adelina Bacherozza De Porcaris - the grandmother
- Deep Red (1975) - Elvira
- La Cage aux Folles (1978) - Mme Charrier
- La Luna (1979) - Maestro's Sister (uncredited)
