= Edoardo Matania =

Italian painter (1847–1929)

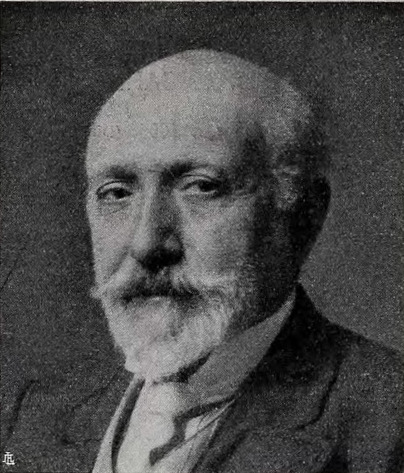
- Born: 30 August 1847; Naples, Kingdom of the Two Sicilies
- Died: 17 December 1929 (aged 82); Naples, Kingdom of Italy
- Occupations: Painter; illustrator
- Spouse: Clelia della Valle
- Children: Fortunino Matania
- Relatives: Alberto della Valle (brother-in-law); Ugo Matania (nephew); Clelia Matania (granddaughter)

Edoardo (or Eduardo) Matania (30 August 1847 – 17 December 1929) was an Italian painter and illustrator, depicting detailed penciled portraits; and genre, patriotic and historic scenes.

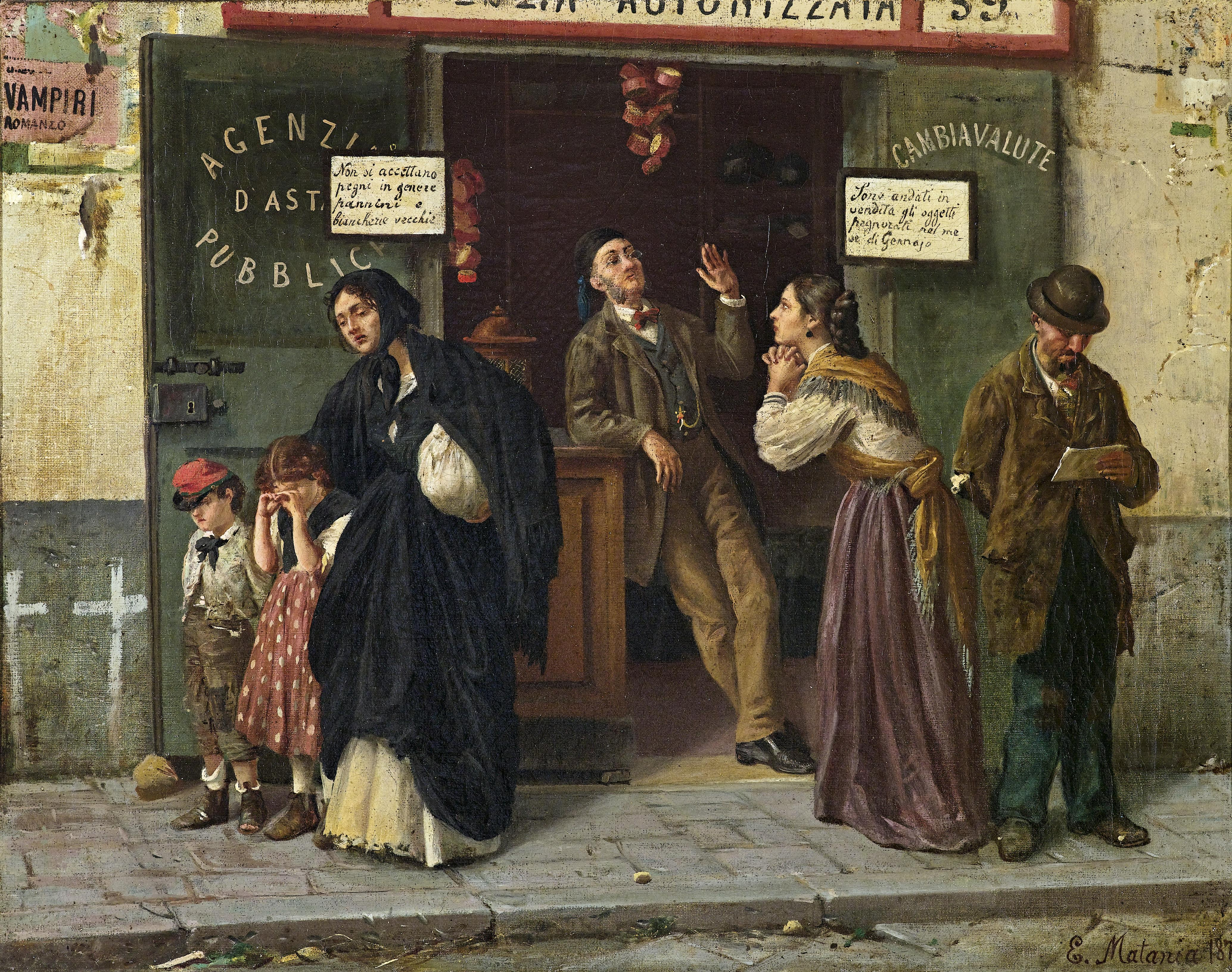
At the Pawnbroker (1870s)

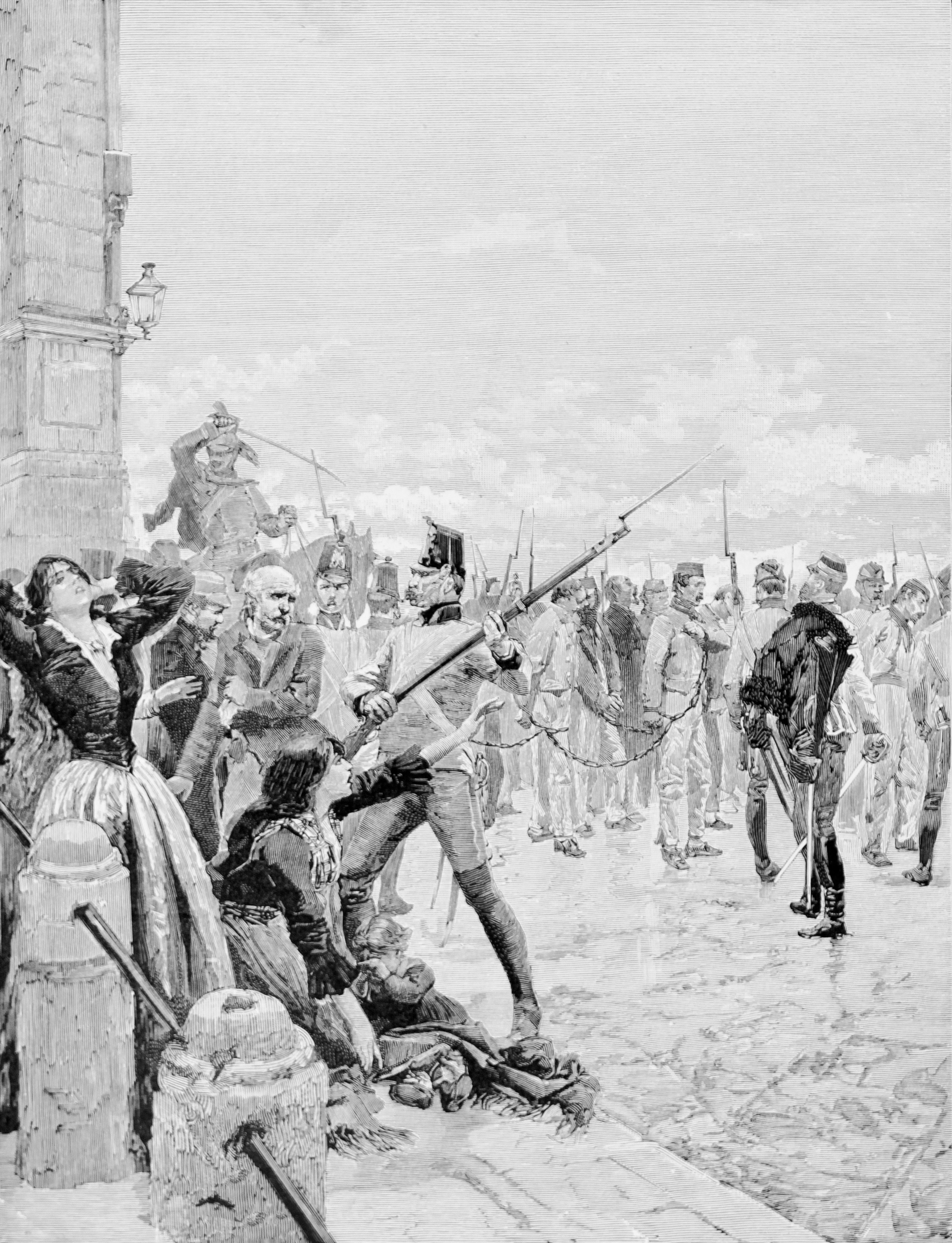
Belfiore Martyrs led to scaffold in Mantua (1870s)

== Life ==
He was born in Naples, and trained starting in 1862 at the Istituto di belle arti of Naples. He made a living mostly as an illustrator for the Bideri publishing house, and also worked with the editor Emilio Treves. He was attached to the School of Resina. For example, he illustrated a Storia del Risorgimento Italiano (1889) by Francesco Bertolini. Matania also illustrated an edition of Ariosto's La Gerusalemme liberata. He was one of the painters to decorate the ceilings of the Caffè Gambrinus of Naples.

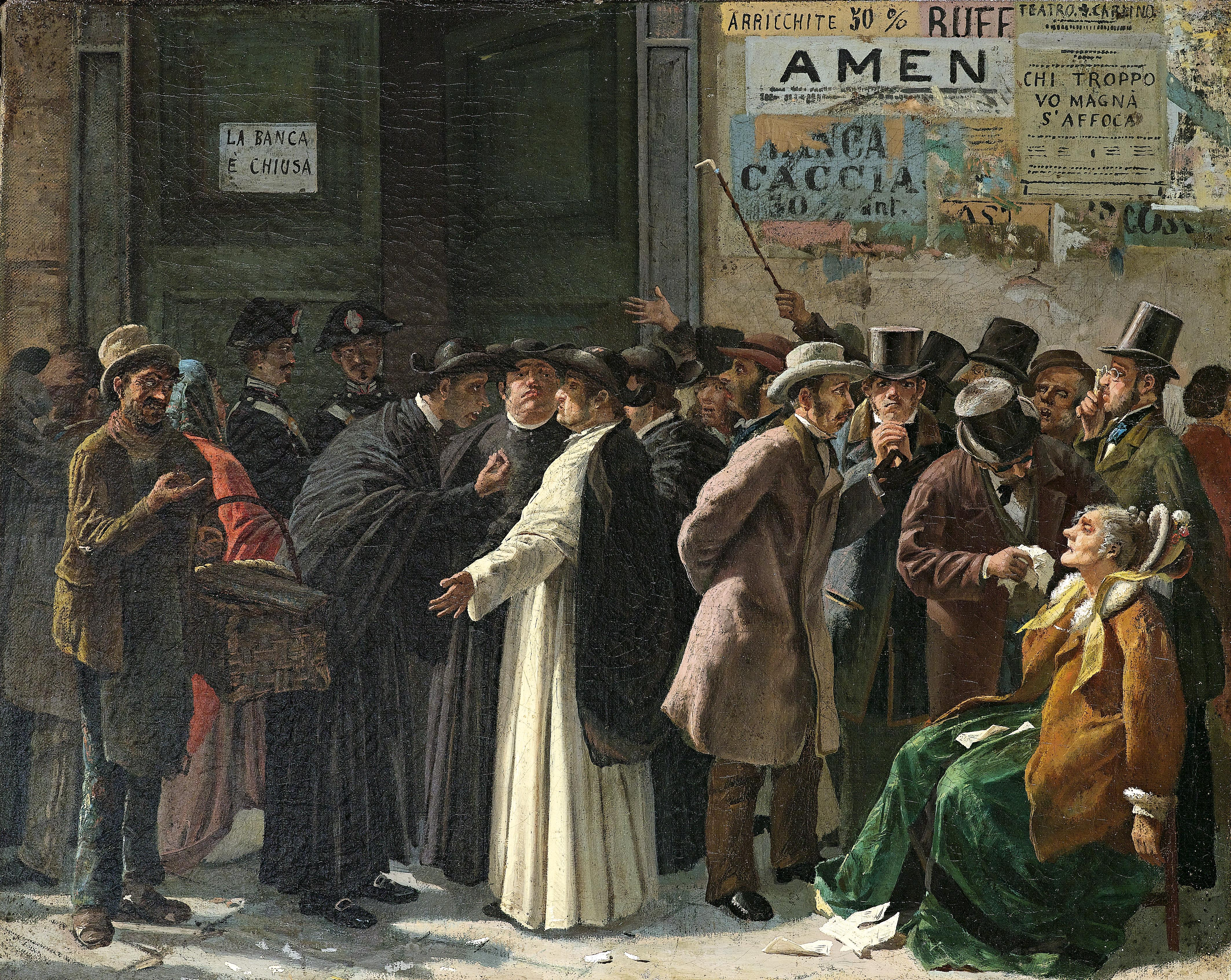
Shuttered Bank

Others in his immediate family also became well known illustrators. His son, Fortunino Matania also became a well-known painter and illustrator. Edoardo's nephew, Ugo Matania also became a well-known illustrator during World War I.

== Gallery ==
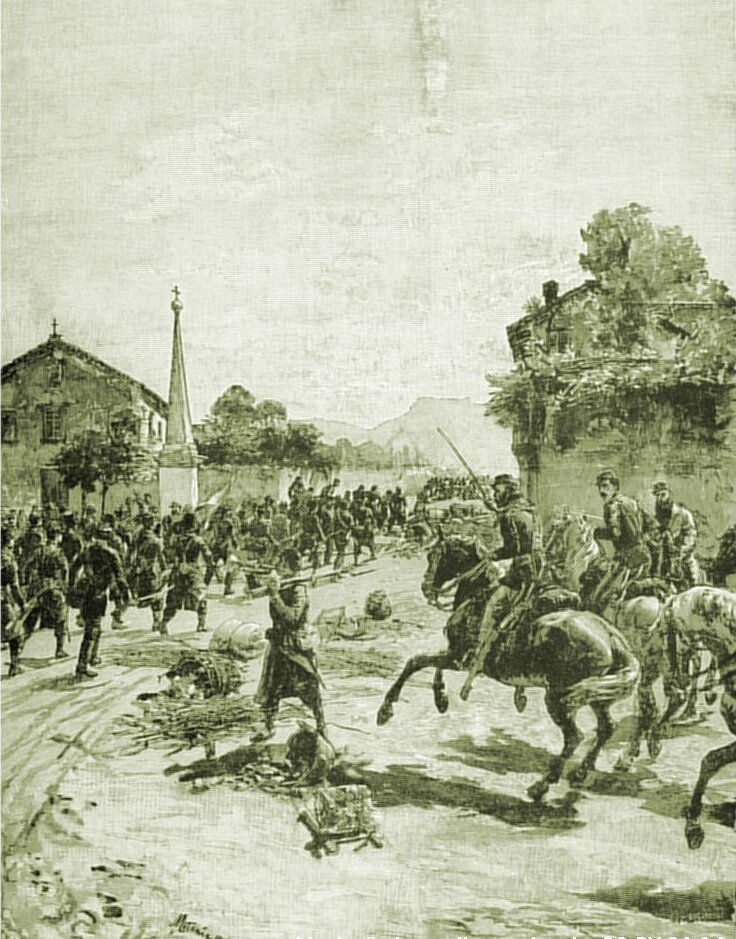
Battle of Varese

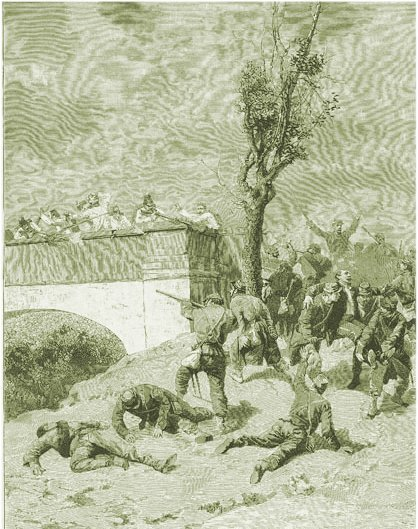
Death of Captain Narcisso Bronzetti at the Battle of Treponti

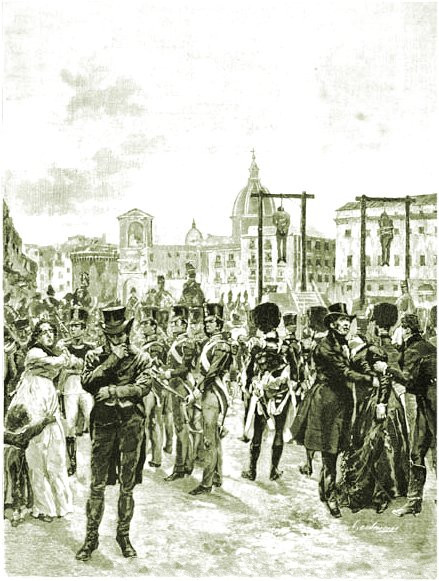
Morelli and Silvati hanged after the failed uprising of 1820–1821 in Naples

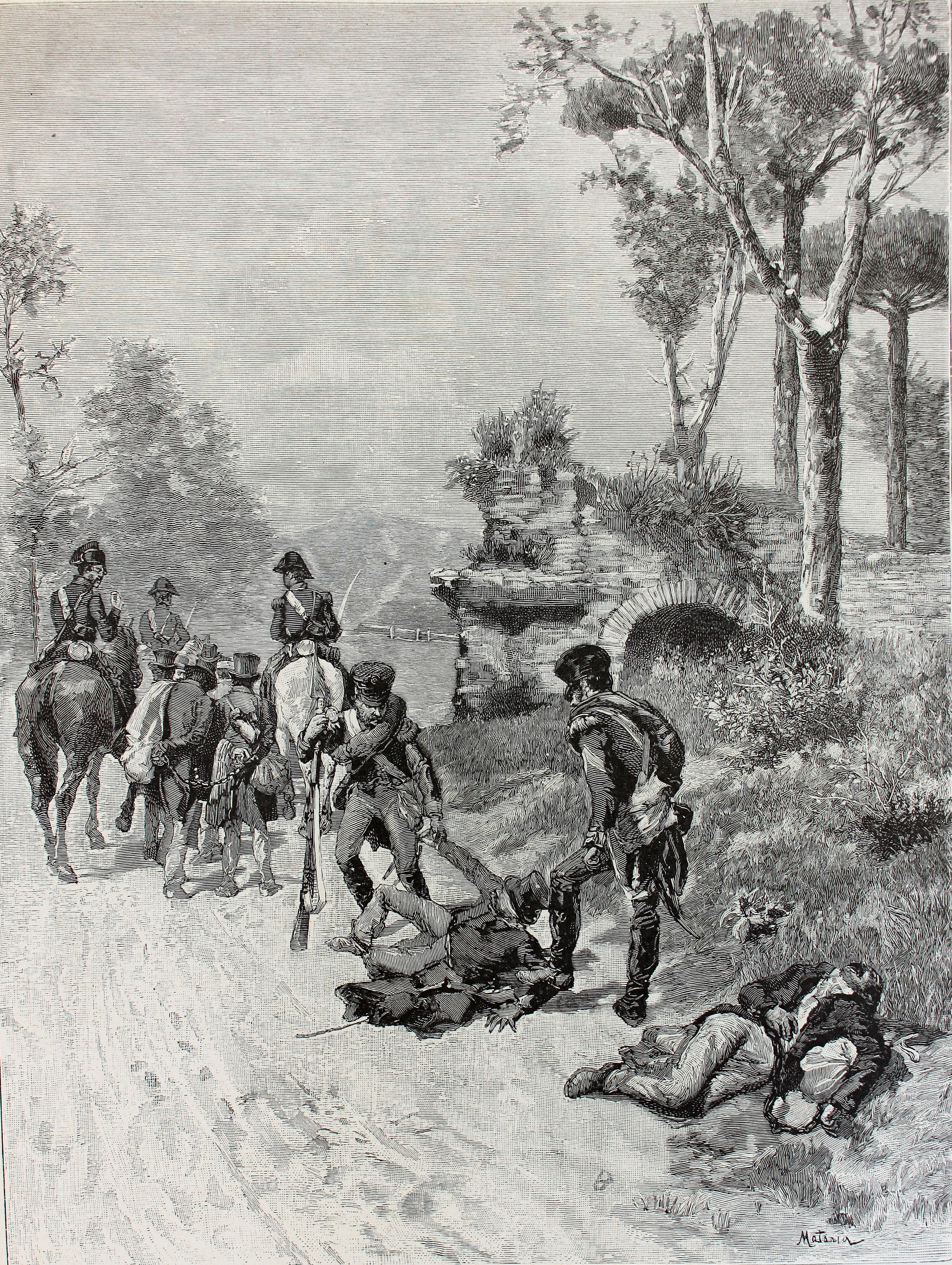
Arrest of Pasquale Rossi, brothers Donato, Domenico and Patrizio Capozzoli at Perito by forces of Ferdinand I

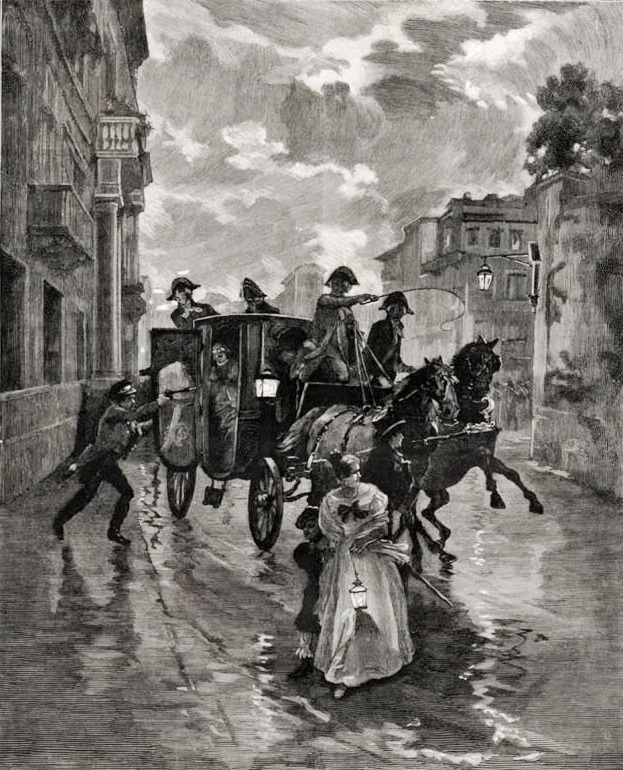
Attempted Murder by Carbonari of Cardinal Agostino Rivarola

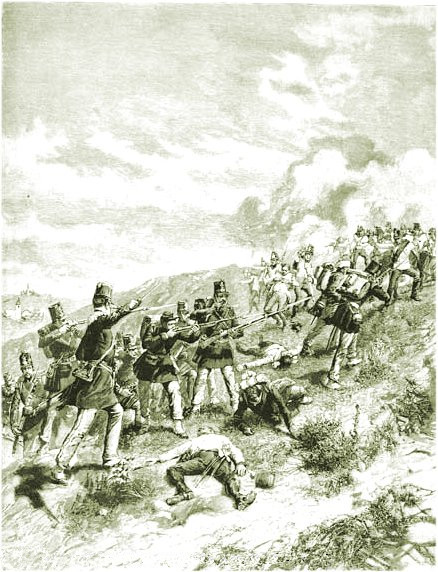
Episode at Staffalo during Battle of Custoza (1848)

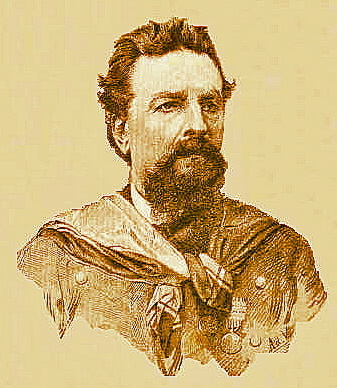
General Giacomo Medici

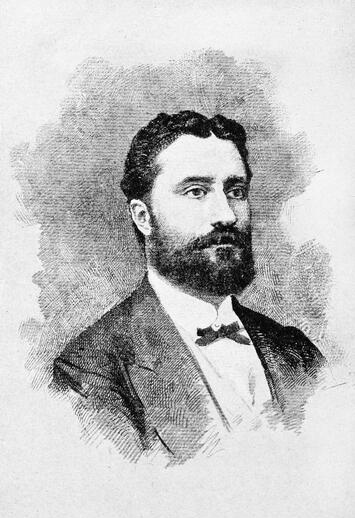
Giovanni Nicotera

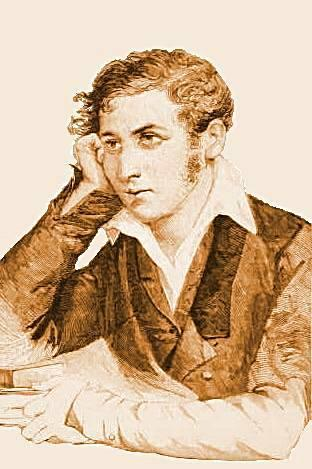
Carlo Cattaneo
