= Ugo Matania =

Italian artist (1888–1963)

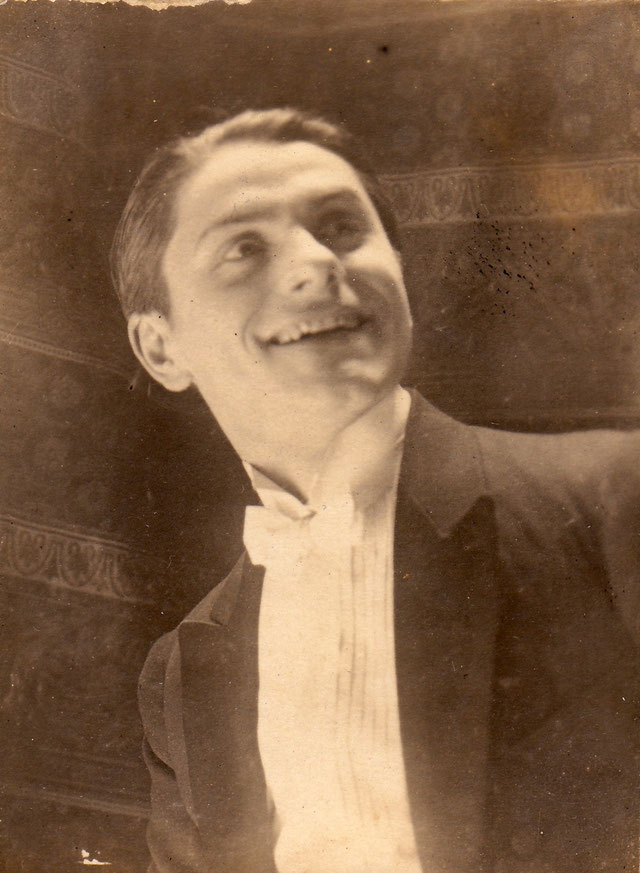
Matania (1923 ca.)

Ugo Matania (1888–1979) was an Italian artist and illustrator active in Britain during the First World War, particularly noted for his works for The Sphere and The London Magazine. Three of his oil paintings and one of his watercolours are in the Wellcome Collection in London.

== Life ==
He was born in Naples, the nephew of Eduardo Matania and the first cousin of Fortunino Matania, both also artists. In 1911 he received a degree in Advertising Diagram and Design and two years later moved to London, remaining there until 1924.

On his return to Italy he worked for Corriere della Sera and their fortnightly magazine Il Romanzo per Tutti. He was still exhibiting in 1948 and also produced marble stations of the cross for the church of Maria Santissima del Carmine in Castellammare di Stabia.
