= Charles Abiathar White =

American paleontologist

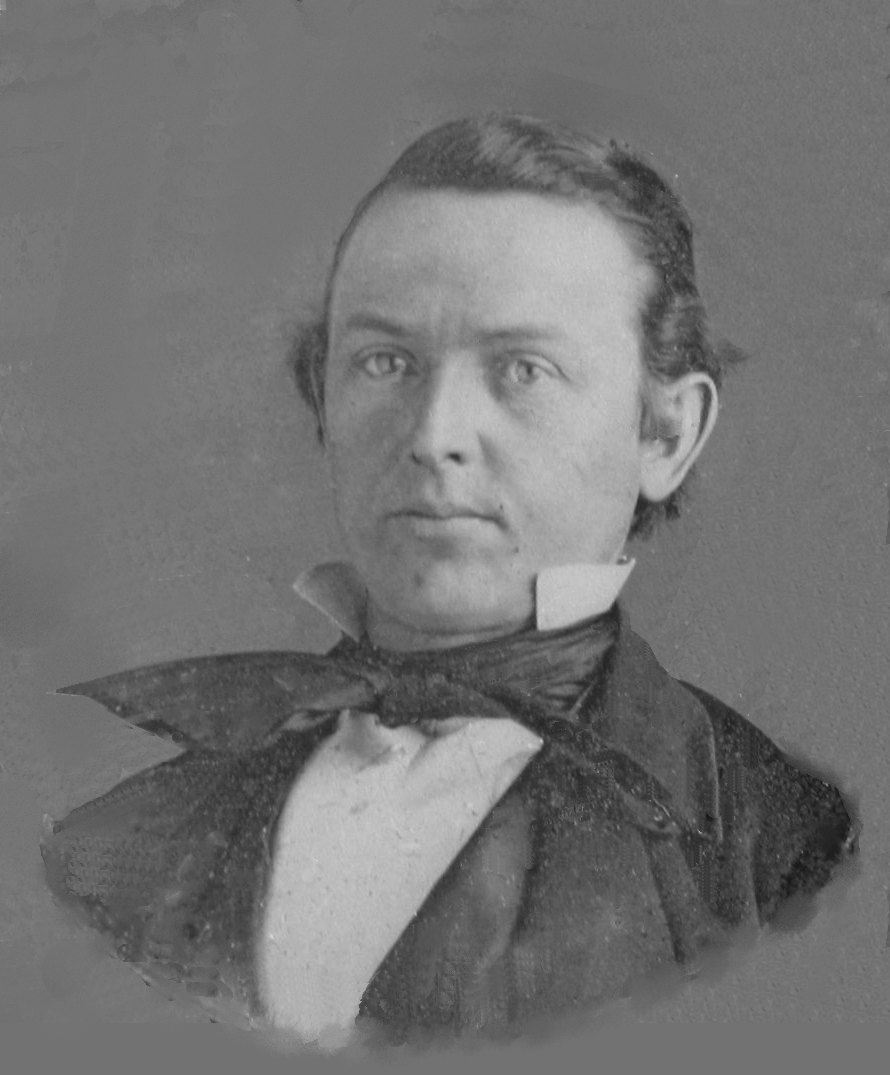
- Age 22
- Born: January 26, 1826; North Dighton, Massachusetts, U.S.
- Died: June 29, 1910 (aged 84); Washington, D.C., U.S.
- Resting place: Rock Creek Cemetery; Washington, D.C., U.S.
- Scientific career
- Fields: Geology, paleontology

Charles Abiathar White (January 26, 1826 – June 29, 1910) was an American geologist, paleontologist, and writer whose publications total 238 titles.

== Biography ==
Charles Abiathar White was born at North Dighton, Massachusetts. He was the State geologist of Iowa in 1866–1870, and professor of natural history in the State University of Iowa in 1867–1873. He held a similar position at Bowdoin College in 1873–1875, and was geologist and paleontologist of the United States Geological Survey between 1874 and 1892, and after 1895 was an associate in paleontology at the United States National Museum.

He became a member of the American Association for the Advancement of Science in 1868, and a Fellow of the same when fellowships were first established. He was general secretary of the association in 1872, and Vice President in 1888. He was elected President of the Biological Society of Washington in 1883, and re-elected in 1884. In December 1901, the Society made him a special Life Member. He was one of the original members of the Geological Society of America. He was elected a member of the National Academy of Sciences in 1889. The degree of Doctor of Laws was conferred upon him by the Iowa State University in 1893.

Abiathar Peak in Yellowstone National Park was named in his honor in 1885 by members of the Arnold Hague Geological Survey.

He died in Washington, D.C., on June 29, 1910, and was buried at Rock Creek Cemetery.

== Selected bibliography ==
- 1883. A review of the non-marine fossil Mollusca of North America.
- 1884. On Mesozoic fossils. USGS Bulletin No. 4.
- 1885. On the Mesozoic and Cenozoic Paleontology of California.
- 1870. Report on the Geological Survey of the State of Iowa: To the Thirteenth General Assembly ... (1870)
- 1870. Report on the Geological Survey of the State of Iowa.
- 1889. On Invertebrate Fossils from the Pacific Coast
- 1890. On the geology and physiography of a portion of northwestern Colorado and adjacent parts of Utah and Wyoming.
- 1895. The Bear River Formation and Its Characteristic Fauna
