= Abiathar Peak =

Mountain in Wyoming, United States

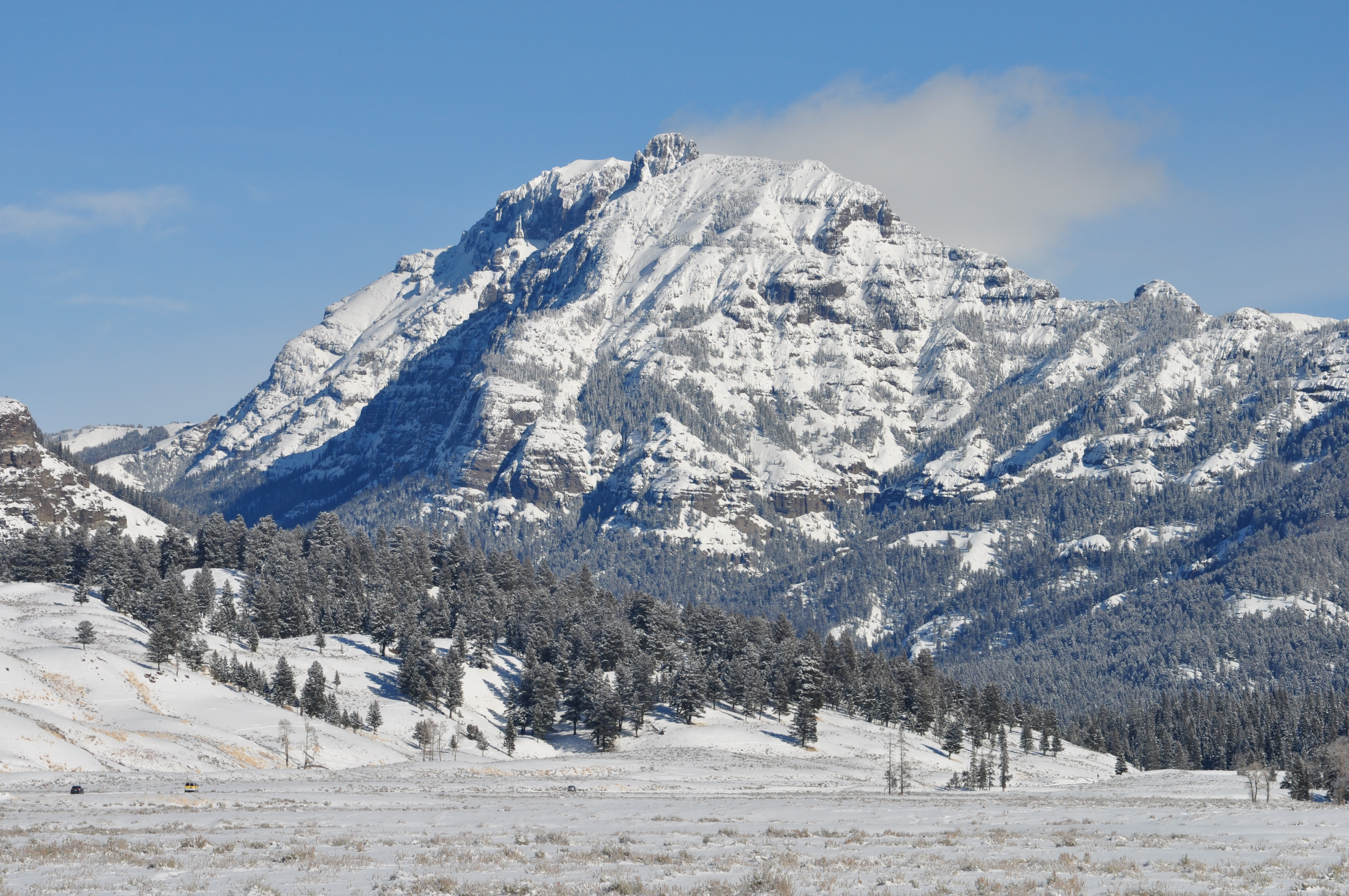
- January 2010

Highest point
- Elevation: 10,928 ft (3,331 m)
- Prominence: 848 ft (258 m)
- Coordinates: 44°58′31″N 110°01′56″W

Naming
- Pronunciation: /əˈbiːəθər/

Geography
- Location within Wyoming
- Location: Yellowstone National Park, Park County, Wyoming, US
- Parent range: Absaroka Range
- Topo map: Abiathar Peak

Abiathar Peak is a mountain peak with an elevation of 10,928 feet (3,331 m) in the northeastern section of Yellowstone National Park, in the Absaroka Range of the U.S. state of Wyoming. It sits across and east of its better known neighbor, Barronette Peak. The peak was named by members of the 1885 Hague Geological Survey to honor Charles Abiathar White, a geologist and paleontologist who had participated in early western geological surveys. White never visited Yellowstone.

Images of Abiathar Peak
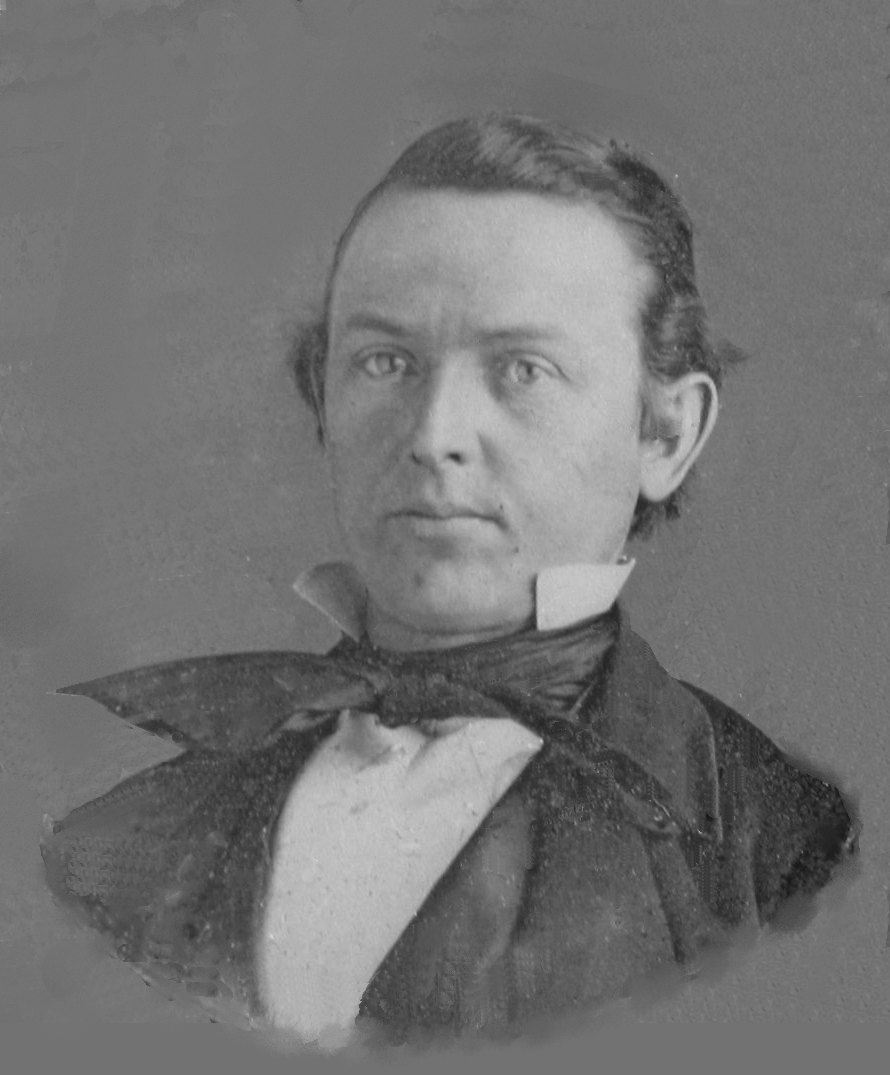
Abiathar Peak's namesake, Charles Abiathar White

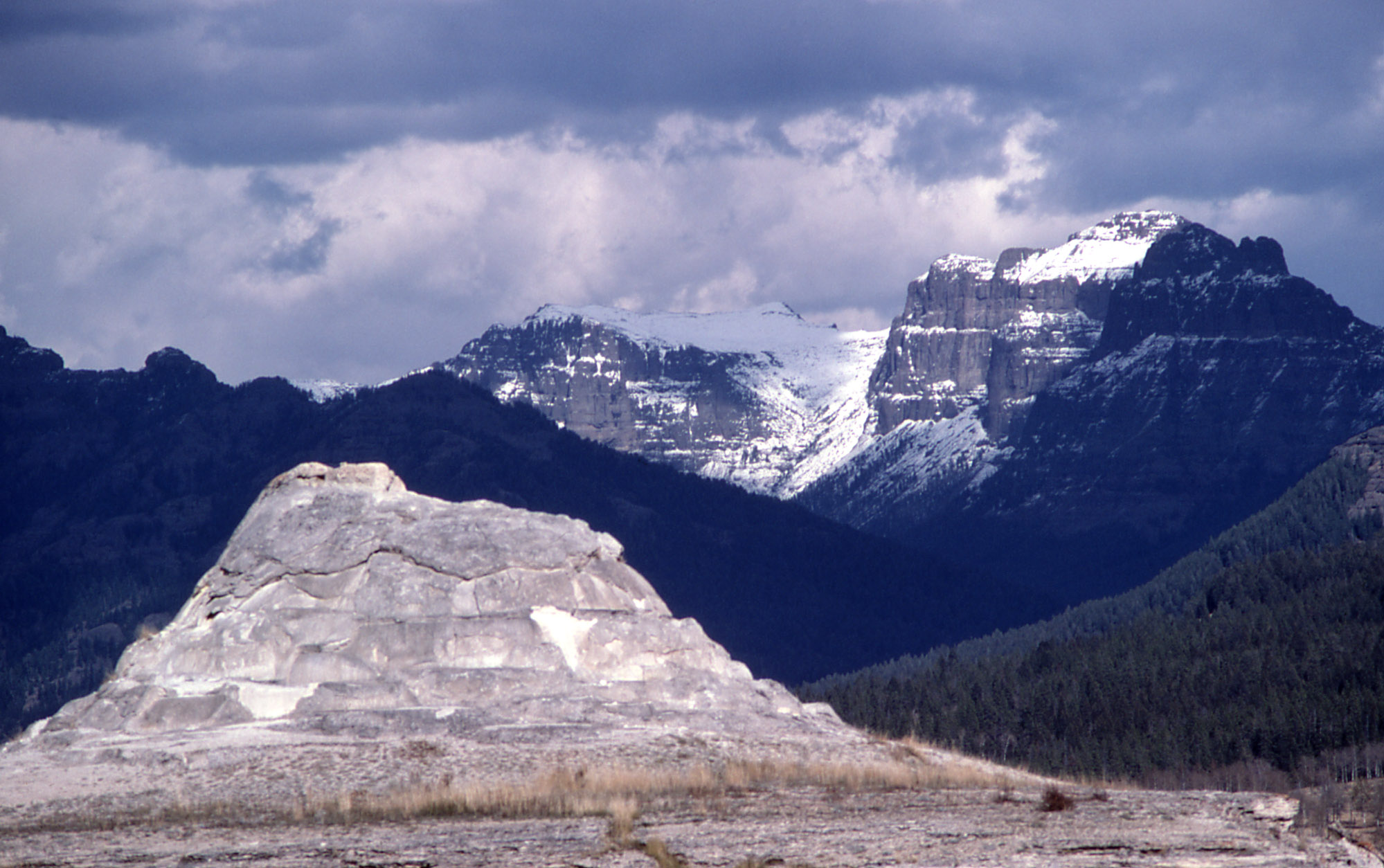
Abiathar Peak center between Soda Butte and Amphitheather Mountain

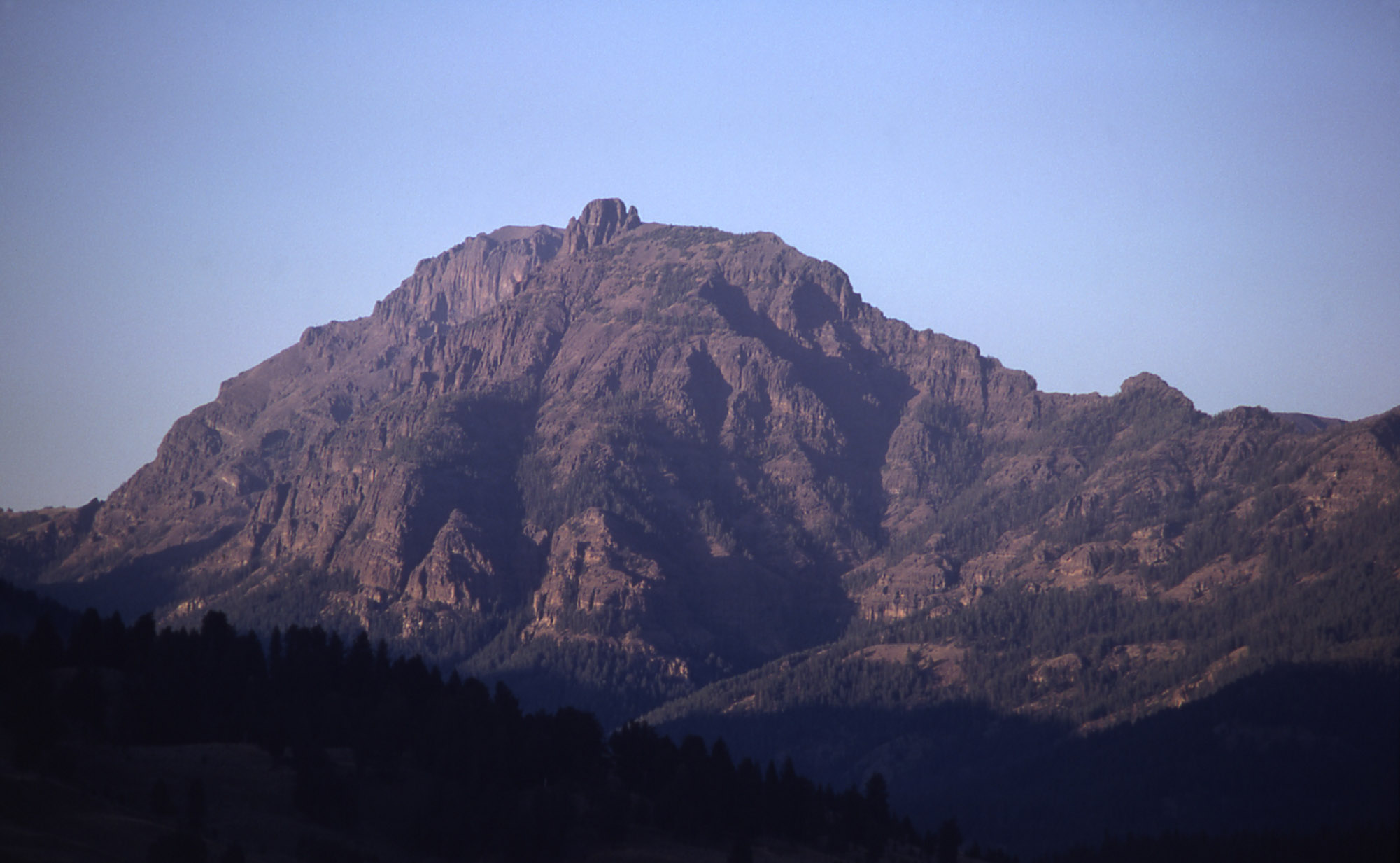
1977

== See also ==
- Mountains and mountain ranges of Yellowstone National Park
