= Eviatar Matania =

Israeli Cyber Security (born 1966)

- אביתר מתניה
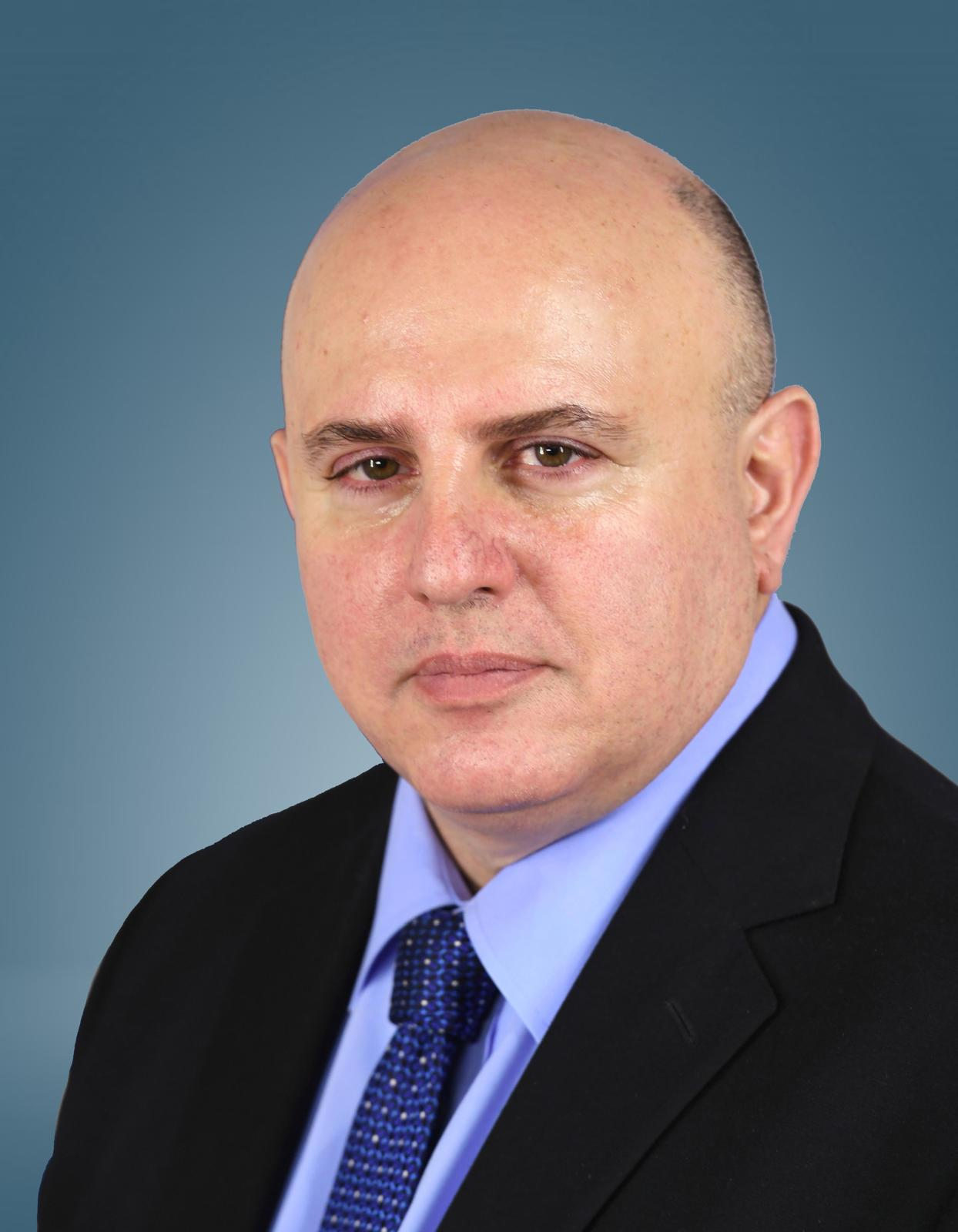
- Matania in 2020
- Born: June 11, 1966 (age 60)
- Education: Phd
- Alma mater: Hebrew University of Jerusalem
- Occupation: Physicist
- Title: 1st Director General of the Israeli National Cyber Directorate; 1st Head of the Israeli National Cyber Bureau
- Term: INCD: February 15, 2015-January 5, 2018; INCB: January 1, 2012-January 5, 2018

Eviatar Matania (Hebrew: אביתר מתניה; born June 11, 1966) was the founder and Head of the Israel National Cyber Bureau (January 2012) and starting February 2015 also the founder and first Director General of the Israel National Cyber Directorate, that consists of both the National Cyber Bureau and the National Cyber Security Authority, a tenure he concluded in January 2018. Currently, Matania is a professor at the School of Political Science, Government and International Affairs at Tel Aviv University, where he also serves as the head of the MA Security Studies Program, and holds an adjunct professorship at Oxford University’s School of Government. Matania also holds consultancy roles in the fields of cyber, technological policies and strategies, and national security, and is the joint-head of the Smart Systems Initiative.

== Early life and education ==
Eviatar Matania was born in Haifa, Israel on June 11, 1966. At age seven Matania lost his elder brother, Ehud, during the Yom-Kippur War (the 1973 war), an event he credits for driving him to seek a meaningful service in the Israeli Defense Forces. He attended HaRe'ali high school in Haifa. Matania is a graduate of the elite military-academic program Talpiot. He holds a B.Sc. in physics and mathematics from the Hebrew University of Jerusalem (Cum Laude), a M.Sc in Mathematics from Tel Aviv University (Cum Laude), with a minor in game theory, and a PhD in judgement and decision-making from the Hebrew University of Jerusalem.

== Early career ==
Enlisting in 1984 to the Israeli Defense Forces, Matania was recruited to the elite military-academic program Talpiot, and then served in various branches of the IDF and the Israeli Ministry of Defense, where he held R&D and command positions. After completing his military service in 1996, Matania took-up analysis and consulting roles within Israel’s hi-tech industry. During 1997-1999 he worked for Pitango Venture Capital as a senior analyst and investment manager. In 2002, Matania returned to active service in Israel’s Administration for the Development of Weapons and Technological Infrastructure (“Maf'at”) to serve as Director of Technological Human Capital in both the Talpiot and Psagot programs. In this role, Matania created the Israeli Defense Forces’ elite intelligence program Havatzalot and the Nahshon program. During this period, Matania received his PhD in Judgement and Decision-Making from the Hebrew University of Jerusalem and was a research associate at the Yuval Ne'eman Workshop for Science, Technology and Security in Tel Aviv University and a visiting lecturer at the Hebrew University of Jerusalem.

== Establishing the Israel National Cyber Bureau ==
Following the Israeli governmental resolution on August 7, 2011, to establish a National Cyber Bureau to develop a comprehensive national cybersecurity strategy for Israel, to lead the nation’s overall cyber policy and to develop and advance the national cyber ecosystem, technological capacity and economic growth, Matania was selected to found and head this bureau, starting January 2012. During his tenure, Matania led the development of the Israeli national cyber security strategy and its implementation, cybersecurity capacity building, the transformation of cybersecurity into an economic growth engine, and the establishment of an architecture for the cooperation and coordination between the United States and Israel on cybersecurity issues. The strategy dealt with differentiating efforts in cyberspace into three layers: robustness, resilience and national defense. Robustness is the fundamental layer, providing a “capacity to repel and contain cyber threats” and is executed in Israel by private organizations with governmental incentives and regulation. Resilience is an event-driven layer and deals with the “ability to recover from or easily adjust to misfortune or change”, executed in Israel by both private and governmental entities. Finally, national defense is aimed at disrupting “cyber attacks by focusing on the human factor behind them through national operational defense capabilities” mustered by the government.

== Director General of Israel National Cyber Directorate ==
Following the Israeli Government resolution of 2015 to establish a sister entity to the Cyber Bureau – The National Cyber Security Authority (NCSA), as part of a single directorate, Matania was appointed as the first Director General of the new directorate. In this capacity, he continued to head the Cyber Bureau, was charged with the preparations for the establishment of the new Cyber Authority (established in 2016), and was responsible for approving the NCSA’s annual work plans and budgets. During Matania's tenure, he facilitated the establishment of numerous cyber research centers in prominent Israeli universities, such as the Blavatnik Interdisciplinary Cyber Research Center at Tel Aviv University, the Federmann Cyber Security Center at the Hebrew University of Jerusalem, and the BGU Cyber Security Research Center at Ben-Gurion University of the Negev, among others. Toward the end of his tenure, the two units of the National Cyber Directorate – the bureau and the authority – were merged into one unified entity.

=== Later career ===
On December 31, 2017, Matania completed his six-year term as Israel's Cyber Director and transitioned to academia and strategic consultancy. Matania is a professor at the School of Political Science, Government and International Affairs at Tel Aviv University, where he conducts research in the fields of technological policies, cyber and security, areas in which he also functions as a strategic consultant. As part of his professorship, he was appointed the head of Tel Aviv University's MA program in Security Studies. Matania is also a member of the Blavatnik Interdisciplinary Cyber Research Center, a visiting professor at Oxford University, and the joint-head of the "Smart Systems Initiative", a task force appointed by Israeli Prime Minister Benjamin Netanyahu to formulate Israel's strategy on advanced computing technologies such as Artificial Intelligence and quantum computing.

In 2021 Matania’s book, “Cybermania“ was published (co-written with Amir Rapaport). “Cybermania” describes the story of the global cyber revolution and the leading role Israel has in shaping the cyber eco system.

== Publications ==
=== Books ===
- Matania, E., and Rapaport, A. (2021). CYBERMANIA: How Israel Became a Global Powerhouse in the Domain That is Revolutionizing the Future of Humanity. Kfar Saba, Israel: Cybertech-Arrowmedia.
- Matania, E. (2013). A Diary of Atonement. Tel Aviv, Israel: Eked. [In Hebrew]

=== Selection of Academic Articles ===
==== Security and Strategy ====
- Matania, E., Podhorzer, O., and Daniel, N. (2022). The Elusive Presence of Technology in Israel’s Strategic Security Thinking. Strategic Assessment, 25(3), 25-44.
- Matania, E, (2022). Behind Mandatory Service in Israel: From the Rationale of the Militia to the Rationale of Military-Technological Superiority. Strategic Assessment, 25(2), 3-23.
- Matania, E., and Seri-Levy, E. (2021). By Sling and by Stone: A Strategy of Technological Reduction. Strategic Assessment, 24(2), 3-18.

==== Security and Cyber ====
- Sommer, U., Matania, M., and Hassid, N. (2023) "The rise of companies in the cyber era and the pursuant shift in national security," Political Science, 75:2, 140-164, doi:10.1080/00323187.2023.2278499
- Matania, E., and Sommer, U. (2023). "Tech titans, cyber commons and the war in Ukraine: An incipient shift in international relations." International Relations (In print). doi:10.1177/00471178231211500
- Matania, E. and Yoffe, L., 2022. "Some Things the Giant Could Learn from the Small: Unlearned Cyber Lessons for the US from Israel." The Cyber Defense Review, 7(1), pp.101-110.
- Matania, E., and Tal-Shir, E. (2020). "Continuous terrain remodeling: gaining the upper hand in cyber defence." Journal of Cyber Policy, Vol. 5, No. 2, pp. 285-301. doi:10.1080/23738871.2020.1778761
- Paikowsky, D., and Matania, E. (2019). "Influence Operations in Cyber: Characteristics and Insights." In INSS Memorandum No. 197, The Cognitive Campaign: Strategic and Intelligence Perspectives, Y. Kupperwasser and D. Siman-Tov (Eds.), pp. 99-112.
- Matania, E., Yoffe, L., and Goldstein, T. (2017). "Structuring the national cyber defence: In evolution towards a Central Cyber Authority." Journal of Cyber Policy, Vol. 2, No. 1, pp. 16-25. doi:10.1080/23738871.2017.1299193
- Matania, E., Yoffe, L., and Mashkautsan, M. (2016). "A Three-Layer Framework for a Comprehensive National Cyber-security Strategy." Georgetown Journal of International Affairs, Vol. 17, No. 3, pp. 77-84. doi:10.1353/gia.2016.0038

==== Tech Policy ====
- Ben-Israel, I., Matania, E., and Friedman, L. (2020). "Harnessing Innovation: Israeli Perspectives on AI Ethics and Governance." In Towards Regulation of AI Systems, CAHAI Secretariat (Ed.), pp.120-147.
- Avni, T., and Matania, E. (2020, September 18). "The AI landscape is shifting from ‘data’ to ‘knowledge.’ Here’s why that matters." The Next Web.
