= Fortunino Matania =

Italian painter (1881–1963)

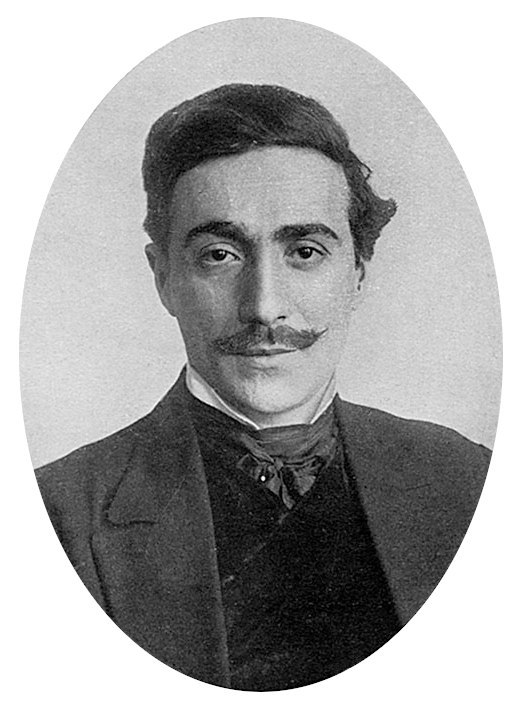
A photograph of Fortunino Matania published in The Sphere in 1915

Chevalier Fortunino Matania (16 April 1881 – 8 February 1963) was an Italian artist noted for his realistic portrayal of World War I trench warfare and of a wide range of historical subjects.

== Life ==
Born in Naples, the son of artist Eduardo Matania, Fortunino Matania studied at his father's studio, designing a soap advertisement at the age of 9 and exhibiting his first work at Naples Academy at 11. By the age of 14 he was helping his father produce illustrations for books and magazines. His talent was recognised by the editor of the Italian periodical L'Illustrazione Italiania and Matania produced weekly illustrations for the magazine between 1895 and 1902.

At the age of 20, Matania began working in Paris for Illustration Francaise and, in 1902, was invited to London to cover the Coronation of Edward VII for The Graphic. Matania subsequently covered every major event – marriage, christening, funeral and Coronation – of British royalty up to the coronation of Elizabeth II in 1953.

In 1904, Matania joined the staff of The Sphere where some of his most famous work was to appear, including his illustrations of the sinking of the RMS Titanic in 1912. Around 1906 to 1910 he painted the life in the lobby of the Hotel Excelsior in Rome.

The Last General Absolution of the Munsters at Rue du Bois by Matania depicting the regiment on the eve of the Battle of Aubers Ridge in May 1915

At the outbreak of the First World War, Matania became a war artist and was acclaimed for his graphic and realistic images of trench warfare. His painting for the Blue Cross entitled Goodbye, Old Man, showing a British soldier saying farewell to his dying horse, is a fine example of his emotive work. His painting of the Green Howards including Henry Tandey is a central part of a famous story.

But it was after the war, when he switched to scenes of ancient high life for the British woman's magazine, Britannia and Eve, that Matania found his real career. He filled his London studio with reproductions of Roman furniture, pored over history books for suitably lively subjects. Then, with the help of models and statues, he began to paint such subjects as Samson and Delilah, the bacchanalian roisters of ancient Rome, and even early American Indian maidens—all with the same careful respect for accuracy and detail he had used in his news assignments.

Generally he managed to include one or two voluptuous nudes in each picture. "The public demanded it," says Matania. "If there was no nude, then the editor or I would get a shower of letters from readers asking politely why not." He was a standard in Britannia and Eve for 19 years.

Matania exhibited regularly at the Royal Academy, and also at the Royal Institute of Painters in Water Colours, where in 1917 he was elected a member. (Note: Matania exhibited as follows: one work at the Walker Art Gallery, Liverpool, ten works at the Royal Academy, and 27 works at the Royal Institute of Painters in Water Colours.) From 1908 his work appeared in most of the principal magazines in Britain and America, including Illustrated London News, London Magazine, Nash's, Printer's Pie and others. When Britannia and Eve was launched in 1929, Matania became one of its first contributors. For 19 years, he wrote and illustrated historical stories for the magazine. His talents made him a popular illustrator for advertising, posters and catalogues, working for the LMS railway designing posters for Southport and Blackpool, Ovaltine, Burberry's (the sporting outfitters) and many others.

Bénézit lists some auction records for Matania:

- Tenterdem. 16 Oct 2002, Musical Soiree with Beethoven Playing the Piano (oil on canvas, 52x44 cm) 9,000 GBP
- Tenterdem. 16 Oct 2002, Elegant Edwardian Scene with Men and Women at a Polo Match (watercolour, 46x67 cm) 18,250 GBP

Matania was also recommended to Hollywood director Cecil B. DeMille and produced a number of paintings of Rome and Egypt from which authentic designs could be made for the movie The Ten Commandments. In 1933, Matania applied his very realistic style to illustrations for Edgar Rice Burroughs' Pirates of Venus and in 1933–24 to Burrough's Lost on Venus. Matania was one of the leading illustrators selected by Percy Bradshaw for inclusion in his The Art of the Illustrator which presented a separate portfolio for each of twenty illustrators. (Note: The portfolio contained: a brief biography of Matani, an illustration of Matani at work in his studio, an explanation of Matani's method of working. This was accompanied by a plate showing an illustration typical of his work and five other plates showing the work at five earlier stages of its production, from the first rough to the just before the finished drawing or colour sketch. Matani's black and white illustration shows a German cavalryman in combat with an infantryman at a street barricade.)

In later years, Matania provided illustrations to big Italian magazines—from "Il Mattino Illustrato" (1924–1947) and "Scena Illustrata" to "Illustrazione del Popolo" (1941–1947), "Corriere dei Piccoli" (1948–1954), and "Domenica del Corriere" (1948–1951). Towards the end of his life, Matania illustrated features for the educational weekly Look and Learn, and was working on the series A Pageant of Kings at the time of his death.

== Books illustrated by Fortunino Matania ==
- Six Stories from Shakespeare, retold by John Buchan (1934)
- Latin and the Romans, Book One. Ginn & Co. Jenkins & Wagener (1941)
- Latin and the Romans, Book Two. Ginn & Co. Jenkins & Wagener (1942)
- Raphael and Stella: A Baker's Delight Immortalised in Paint, by Matania (1944)
- Great Stories from History, ed. Edward Horton and Peter Shellard (1970)
- The Eagle Book of Amazing Stories 1974 (1973)
- With the British Army on the Western Front: Twelve Signed Artist's Proofs. London: The Sphere & Tatler; [1916]

== Gallery ==
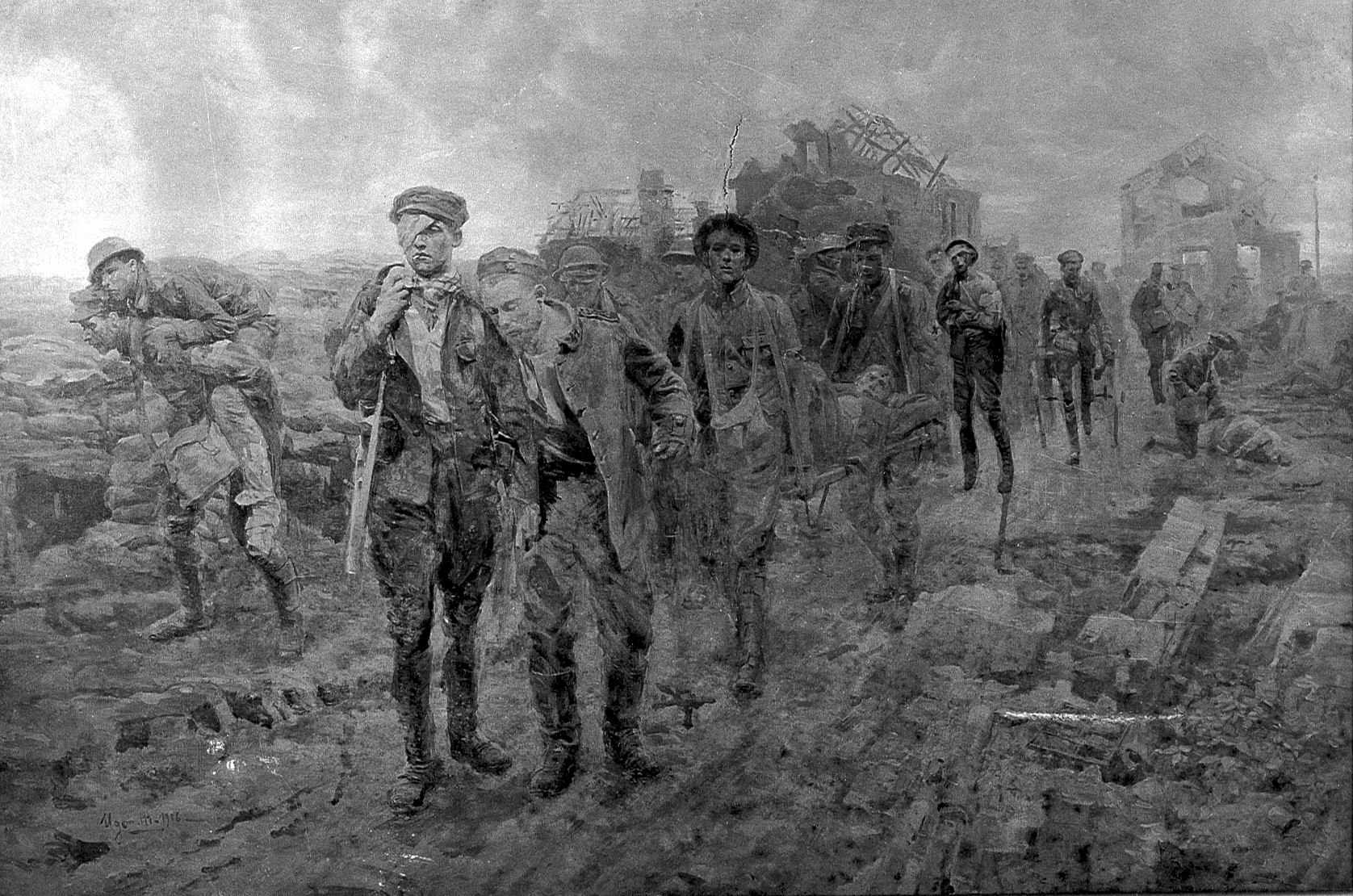
Transport of Wounded

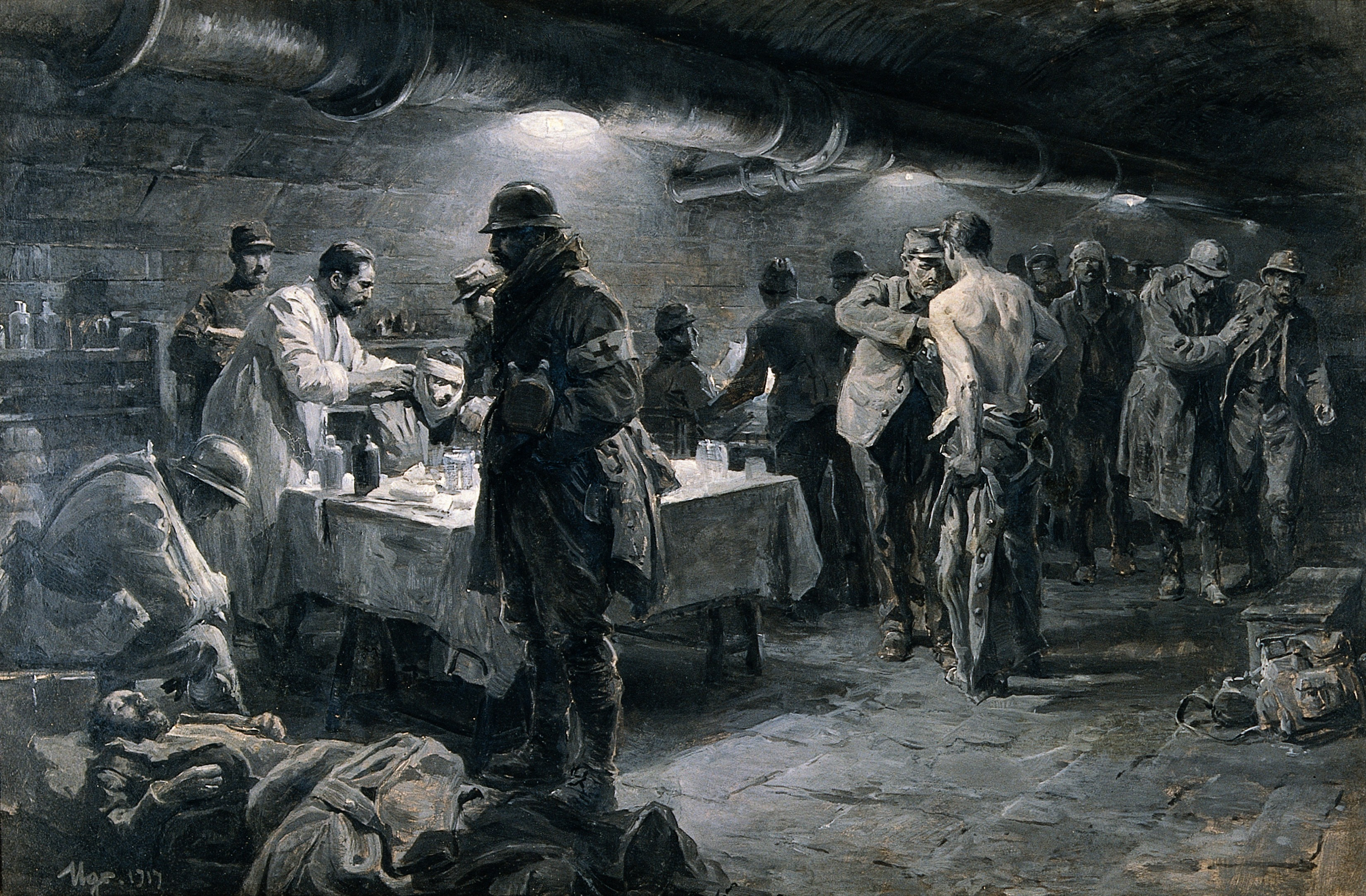
Dressing Station

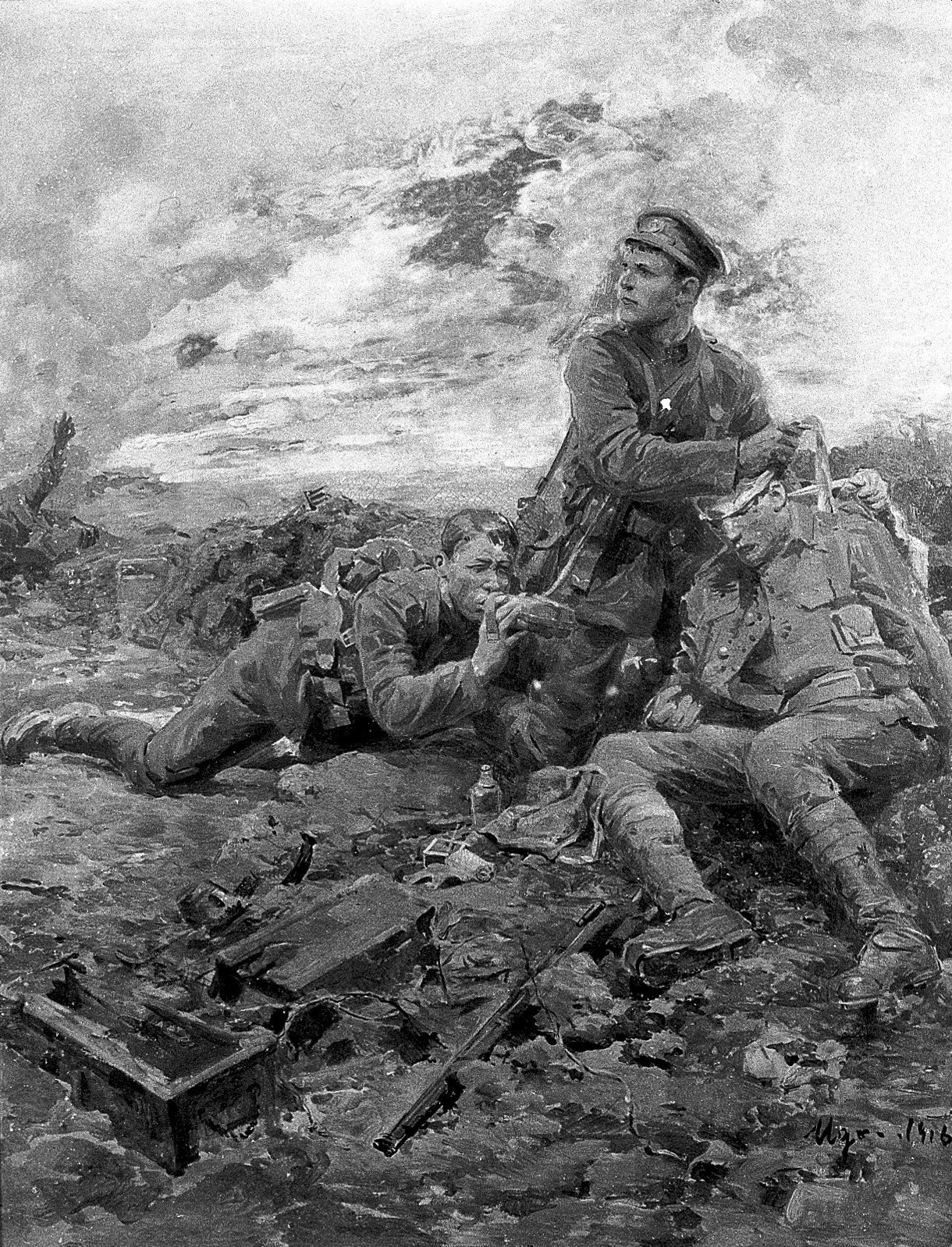
How Private Flynn of South Wales Borderers won the Victoria Cross Medal

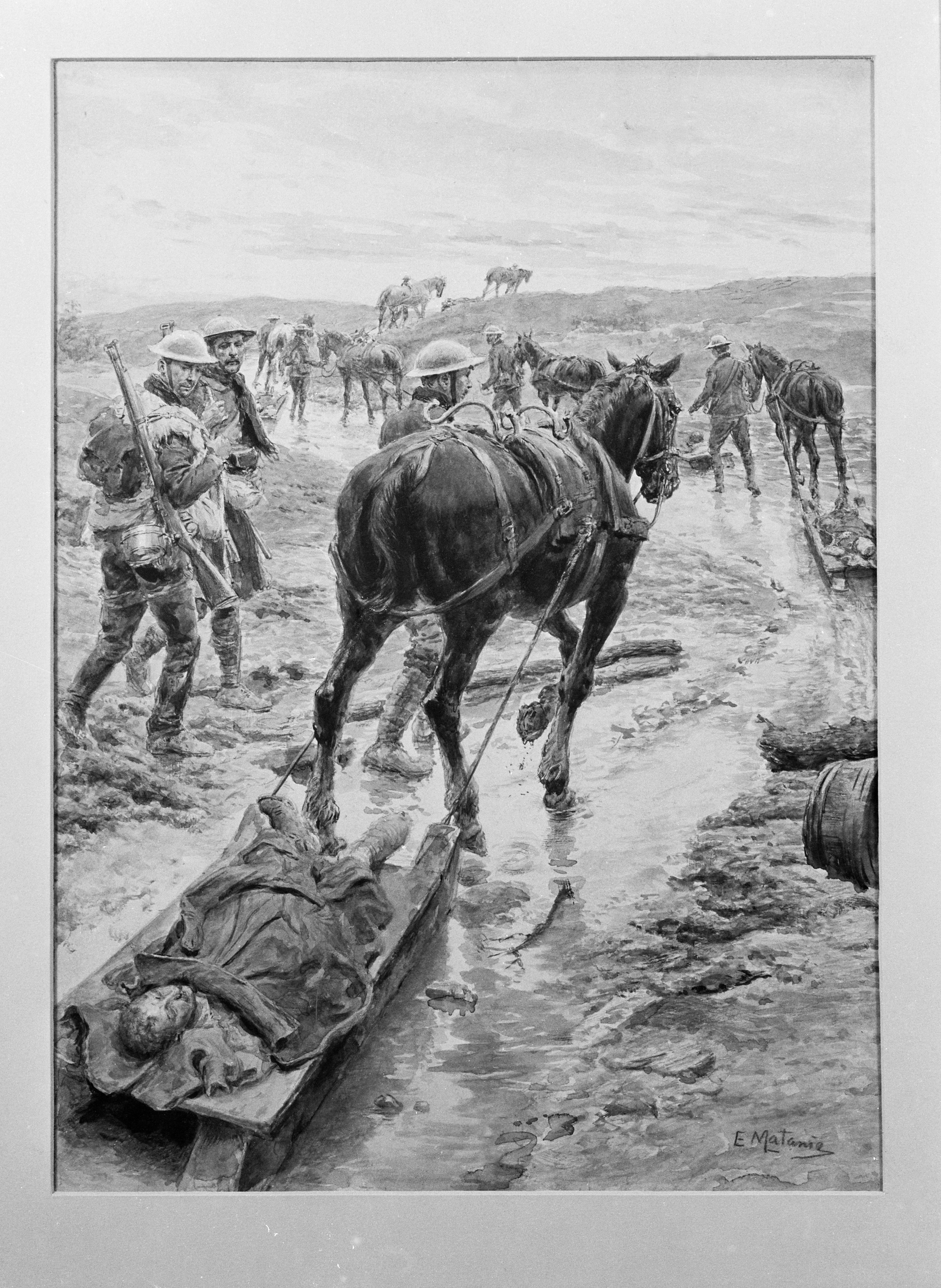
Horse-drawn transport of Wounded

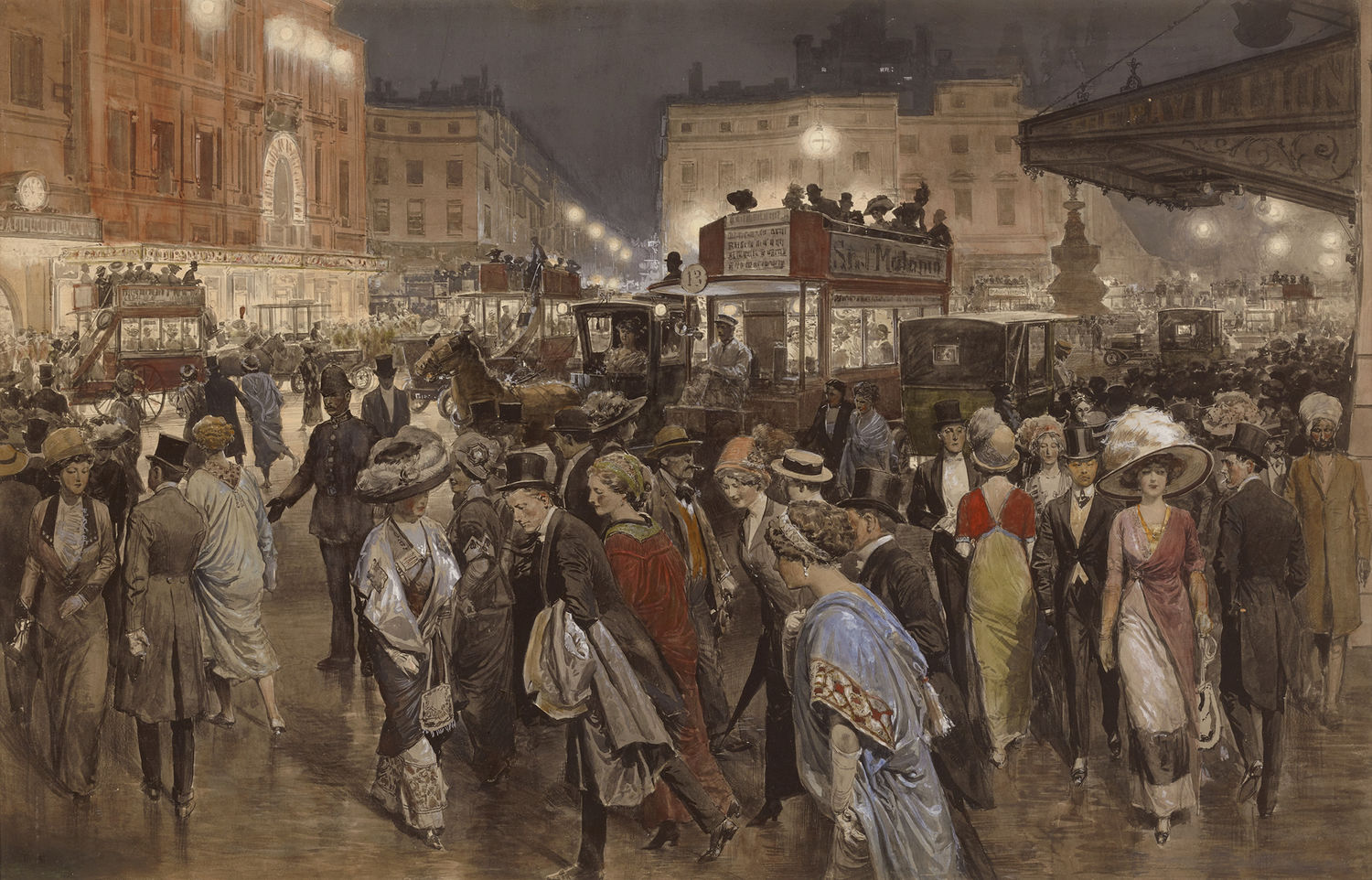
Piccadilly Circus by Fortunino Matania. Watercolor and gouache on paper. Early 20th century. Private Collection.
