= The Ferocious Saladin =

1937 film directed by Mario Bonnard

- Angelo Musco and Alida Valli
- Directed by: Mario Bonnard
- Written by: Ettore Maria Margadonna; Gino Rocca; Mario Bonnard
- Starring: Angelo Musco; Alida Valli; Lino Carenzio; Mario Mazza
- Cinematography: Carlo Montuori
- Edited by: Eraldo Da Roma
- Music by: Giulio Bonnard
- Production company: Capitani Film
- Distributed by: Generalcine
- Release date: 28 August 1937
- Running time: 90 minutes
- Country: Italy
- Language: Italian

The Ferocious Saladin (Italian: Il feroce Saladino) is a 1937 Italian "white-telephones" comedy film directed by Mario Bonnard and starring Angelo Musco, Alida Valli and Lino Carenzio. The film was made at Cinecittà in Rome. On 28 April 1937, Benito Mussolini visited the newly completed studio. Along with the historical epic Scipio Africanus, this was one of the films he saw being made. The film, a vehicle for the Sicilian comedian Angelo Musco, is about an unsuccessful old comedian forced to find another work. While he is selling cakes in a theatre, the audience discover the highly sought-after collectible cards of "The Ferocious Saladin". Inspired by the event, the comedian sets up a successful comic piece on stage.

The film's sets were designed by art director Alfredo Montori.

== Cast ==
- Angelo Musco as il professor Pompeo Darly / Il Feroce Saladino
- Alida Valli as Dora Florida / Sulamita
- Lino Carenzio as Gastone, il fine dicitore
- Mario Mazza as l'acrobata Johnson / Tarzan
- Rosina Anselmi as Amalia, la moglie di Pompeo
- Maria Donati as Yvonne, la tenutaria della pensione per artisti
- Nicola Maldacea as ciambellano
- Nino Marchesini as il commendator Fani
- Luigi Zerbinati as il segretario di Fani
- Carlo Duse as il regista del teatro di rivista
- Giuseppe Pierozzi as un signore a teatro
- Claudio Ermelli as l'usciere del teatro
- Eduardo Passarelli as un signore ipnotizzato
- Paolo Ferrara as Girolamo Mipaghi
- Eugenio Colombo as l'amministratore del teatro
- Checco Durante as il direttore del teatro Vittoria
- Alfredo Martinelli as il direttore d'orchestra del Teatro Apollo
- Pina Gallini as una signora sul treno
- Alberto Sordi as l'uomo nascosto sotto il costume del leone
- Elli Parvo as l'attrice truccata all'orientale
- Giuliana Gianni as una ballerina
- Margot Pellegrinetti as il soprano
- Carlo Cecchi as il signore calvo che compra le caramelle a teatro
- Pina Renzi as l'attrice nervosa dal parlare incomprensibile
- Armando Fineschi as il marito dell'attrice nervosa
- Rocco D'Assunta as il conte di Montholon
- Carla Candiani as la contessa Albina di Montholon

== Bibliography ==
- Gundle, Stephen. Mussolini's Dream Factory: Film Stardom in Fascist Italy. Berghahn Books, 2013.
