= Michele Abruzzo =

Italian actor (1904–1996)

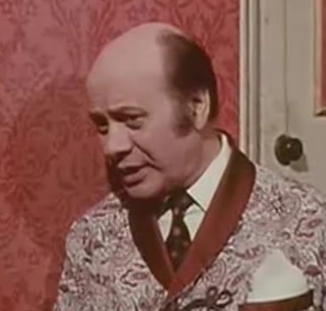
- Michele Abruzzo in the movie Un caso di coscienza (1970)
- Born: 29 December 1904; Sciacca
- Died: 17 November 1996 (aged 91); Catania

Michele Abruzzo (29 December 1904 – 17 November 1996) was an Italian actor.

== Life and career ==
Born in Sciacca, Abbruzzo made his debut on stage at 12 years old. Often regarded as the successor of Angelo Musco, he formed his first stage company in 1938 with Rosina Anselmi and the same year he got his first lead role in cinema in Mario Mattoli's A Lady Did It. In 1958 he was one of the founders of the Teatro Stabile in Catania. He announced his retirement in 1979, then he came back on stage in 1989, aged 85.

== Filmography ==
| Year | Title | Role | Notes |
|---|---|---|---|
| 1920 | A Legge | | |
| 1938 | A Lady Did It | Luca Sardo | |
| 1948 | I cavalieri dalle maschere nere | Matteo | |
| 1953 | I Chose Love | Vitali | |
| 1956 | Andalusia Express | | Uncredited |
| 1957 | Classe di ferro | Maggiordomo | |
| 1957 | La trovatella di Pompei | Pasquale Rossi | |
| 1961 | Pastasciutta nel deserto | Il Maggiore | |
| 1963 | Mad Sea | Oreste - il fratello di Margharita | |
| 1965 | Made in Italy | The Commander | (segment "2 'Il Lavoro', episode 2") |
| 1970 | Un caso di coscienza | Barone | |
| 1972 | The Sicilian Checkmate | Zaccaria | |
| 1972 | Il caso Pisciotta | Procuratore della Repubblica | |
| 1974 | Till Marriage Do Us Part | Monsignor Pacifico | |
| 1975 | Il fidanzamento | Edmondo Guglielmi - father of Mirella | |
