= Against the Law (1950 film) =

1950 film

- French film poster
- Directed by: Flavio Calzavara
- Written by: Flavio Calzavara; Pietro Germi; Giuseppe Mangione; Guglielmo Santangelo
- Produced by: Giorgio Carini
- Starring: Marcello Mastroianni; Fulvia Mammi; Renato Malavasi
- Cinematography: Giovanni Vitrotti
- Edited by: Marcella Gengarelli
- Music by: Franco Casavola
- Production company: Scala Film
- Distributed by: Compagnia Edizioni Internazionali Artistiche Distribuzione
- Release date: 8 September 1950
- Running time: 99 minutes
- Country: Italy
- Language: Italian

Against the Law (Italian: Contro la legge) is a 1950 Italian crime film directed by Flavio Calzavara and starring Marcello Mastroianni, Fulvia Mammi and Renato Malavasi.

The film's sets were designed by the art director Virgilio Marchi.

== Plot ==
Marcello Curti is a young man who is part of a middle-class family. In spite of his appearances, however, he conducts trafficking in dirty money by acting as an intermediary between the large foreign mafia clans and his fellow villagers.

During his usual bargaining, a fight breaks out between the two sides and the buyer of US dollars is fatally wounded by a gunshot. Immediately after the fight, the police are called and the killer manages to escape, leaving Curti alone with the body.

The young man is therefore accused of manslaughter, and therefore begins a long series of interrogations administered by the police inspector and the sergeant. Although the evidence seems overwhelming, the police inspector is convinced that the young Curti is not the perpetrator, so he leaves him on parole; later, however, he has him tailed to control all the boy's movements.

In the meantime, however, Marcello Curti begins his own investigation to search for the real killer, helped by his faithful girlfriend. Determined to take justice by himself, the young Curti arrives on the trail of the murderer, thanks to a detail found on the corpse previously analyzed.

In the end, a fight takes place between Marcello Curti and the murderer, named Alfredo; following a ferocious chase, Curti manages to kill the culprit. Meanwhile, the police station had followed the whole affair, intervening in the middle of the final confrontation. The young Curti therefore manages to prove his innocence before the court and can thus begin to live peacefully again, no longer having to deal with the trafficking that previously saw him as a protagonist.

== Cast ==
- Marcello Mastroianni as Marcello Curti
- Fulvia Mammi as Maria
- Renato Malavasi as Peppino
- Tino Buazzelli as Inspector
- Manlio Busoni as Sergeant
- Miranda Campa as Miss Curti
- Angelo Canova as Grigio
- Paolo Panelli as Tremolino
- Mario Terribile as Bird salesman
- Maria Teresa Albani
- Gianni Bonagura
- Orazio Costa
- Pia De Doses
- Angelo Dessy
- Attilio Dottesio

== Bibliography ==
- Chiti, Roberto; Poppi, Roberto (1991). Dizionario del cinema italiano: Dal 1945 al 1959 (in Italian). Rome: Gremese Editore. ISBN 978-88-7605-548-5.
