= The Charmer (1931 film) =

1931 film

- Directed by: Guido Brignone
- Written by: Dino Falconi; Gino Mazzucchi; Gino Rocca
- Starring: Armando Falconi; Tina Lattanzi; Ada Dondini; Mary Kid
- Cinematography: Ubaldo Arata
- Edited by: Carlo José Bassoli; Libero Solaroli
- Music by: Felice Montagnini
- Production company: Società Italiana Cines
- Distributed by: Societa Anonima Stefano Pittaluga
- Release date: 10 April 1931
- Running time: 68 minutes
- Country: Italy
- Language: Italian

The Charmer (Italian: Rubacuori) is a 1931 Italian comedy film directed by Guido Brignone and starring Armando Falconi, Tina Lattanzi and Ada Dondini. It is part of the White Telephone genre of films. It was shot at the Cines Studios in Rome.

== Cast ==
- Armando Falconi as Il banchiere Giovanni Marchi
- Tina Lattanzi as La signora Marchi, moglie di Giovanni
- Ada Dondini as La signora Marchi, madre di Giovanni
- Mary Kid as Ilka Bender
- Grazia del Rio as Dolly
- Vasco Creti as L'allenatore sportivo
- Mercedes Brignone as Giulietta Dupré
- Alfredo Martinelli as Il complice di Dolly
- Guido Celano as Un cliente del night club
- Egon Stief as Joe Battling
- Vittorio Bianchi as Il vicecommissario
- Giorgio Bianchi as Il commissario
- Maria Della Lunga Mandarelli
- Giacomo Moschini
- Roberto Pasetti
- Mario Revera

== Bibliography ==
- Reich, Jacqueline & Garofalo, Piero. Re-viewing Fascism: Italian Cinema, 1922-1943. Indiana University Press, 2002.
