= Palazzo Bastogi =

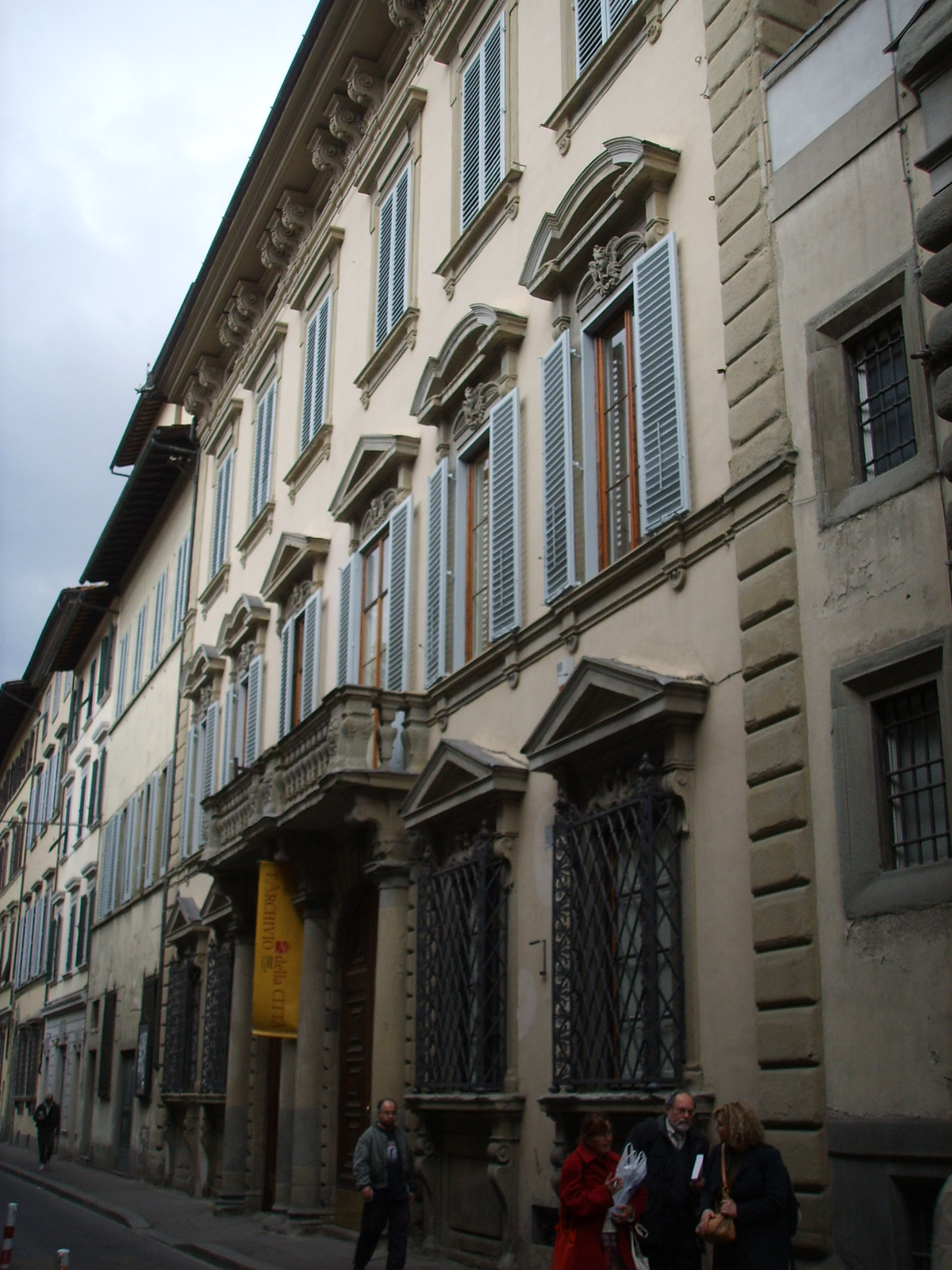
- Palazzo Bastogi
- Interactive map of the Palazzo Bastogi area
- Alternative names: Palazzo Bargilli Sarchi

General information
- Status: In use
- Type: Palace
- Architectural style: Rococo, neoclassical
- Location: Florence, Toscana, Italy, 33, via dell'Oriuolo
- Coordinates: 43.772242°N 11.259611°E
- Current tenants: Headquarters of the Historical Archives of the Municipality of Florence
- Construction started: 1735

Palazzo Bastogi is located at Via dell'Oriuolo 33 in Florence. It houses the Historical Archive of the City of Florence. The palazzo (as Bargilli Sarchi) appears in the list drawn up in 1901 by the General Directorate of Antiquities and Fine Arts as a monumental building to be considered (national artistic heritage).

== History ==
In this area stood some houses owned by the Pazzi families (the garden of the «Pazzi Paradise» was in fact on the site of the adjacent Palazzo della Banca d’Italia), Lippi and Ciampolini, which later came to the monasteries of Santa Felicita and San Salvi. The Bargilli Sarchi family purchased it from them, and in 1735 they promoted the extension and renovation works that distinguish the palazzo today, attributed to the architect Bernardino Ciurini. This information, found locally, is flanked by that collected by Marcello Jacorossi, which vice versa indicate the building as an ancient property of the Albizzi (corresponding by means of gardens to one of the family’s palaces in borgo degli Albizzi), purchased in the 18th century by the Minerbetti family, to whom the extensions and improvements that currently characterise it are due. And again: assuming the first reconstruction to be correct, the building should be identified with the one mentioned in the 1850 guide to Florence under the name of palazzo Franchetti, for which there would be a change of ownership from the Bargilli Sarchi to the Fabbrichesi and then to the Franchetti family.

What is certain is that from 1910 it belonged to the Bastogi family, one of the richest industrial families in Florence in the 19th century, who promoted some renovation work on a project by architect Ugo Giusti in 1918, but then suffered a financial collapse. In 1938, it was sold to the Comune of Florence, which used it first to house various offices, and then, from 1976, the Historical Archive of the Municipality of Florence, which still has its seat here.

In what was the palace’s original garden, a theatre structure (Teatro dell’Oriuolo) was built in the dopoldo that was active from 1951 to 1993.

The building was carefully restored between September 1995 and February of the following year.

== Description ==
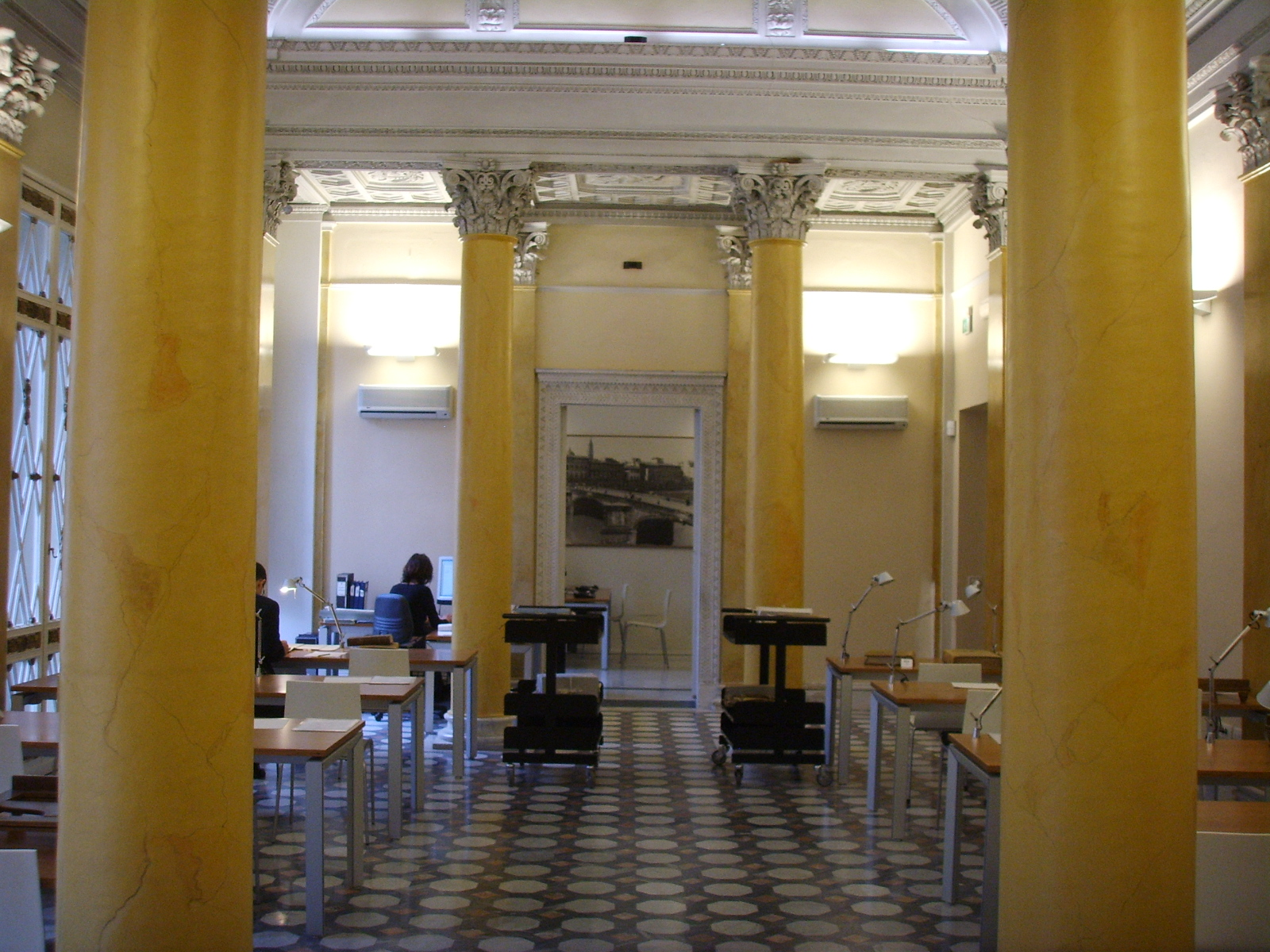
Interior

The palace has an essentially 18th-century façade, organised on six axes for three floors (plus a basement), marked by an insistent decorativism (see the ornaments of the balcony and of the windows with geometric motifs and fantastic animals) and, a rare example for Florence, by a double door flanked by semicolumns and surmounted by an elegant little terrace, with masks on the balustrade alluding to the four seasons and, in the centre, a flag bearer. The rest of the architectural scores are punctuated by stringcourses, kneeling windows on the ground floor, tympanates on the first floor (both with timpani triangular and with broken semicirculars) and architravate on the second; the crowning frame supported by variously decorated shelves would appear to be attributable to a later intervention.

The archive consultation room, rich in stucco and wall paintings, is a fine example of decoration in the style of the early 19th century, with yellow columns standing out against complex white stuccoes, and with a cupola. The musical allegories of the paintings and stuccoes reveal how this was intended as a music hall and dance hall. The monumental staircase also refers to 19th century interventions.

== Theatre of the Oriuolo ==
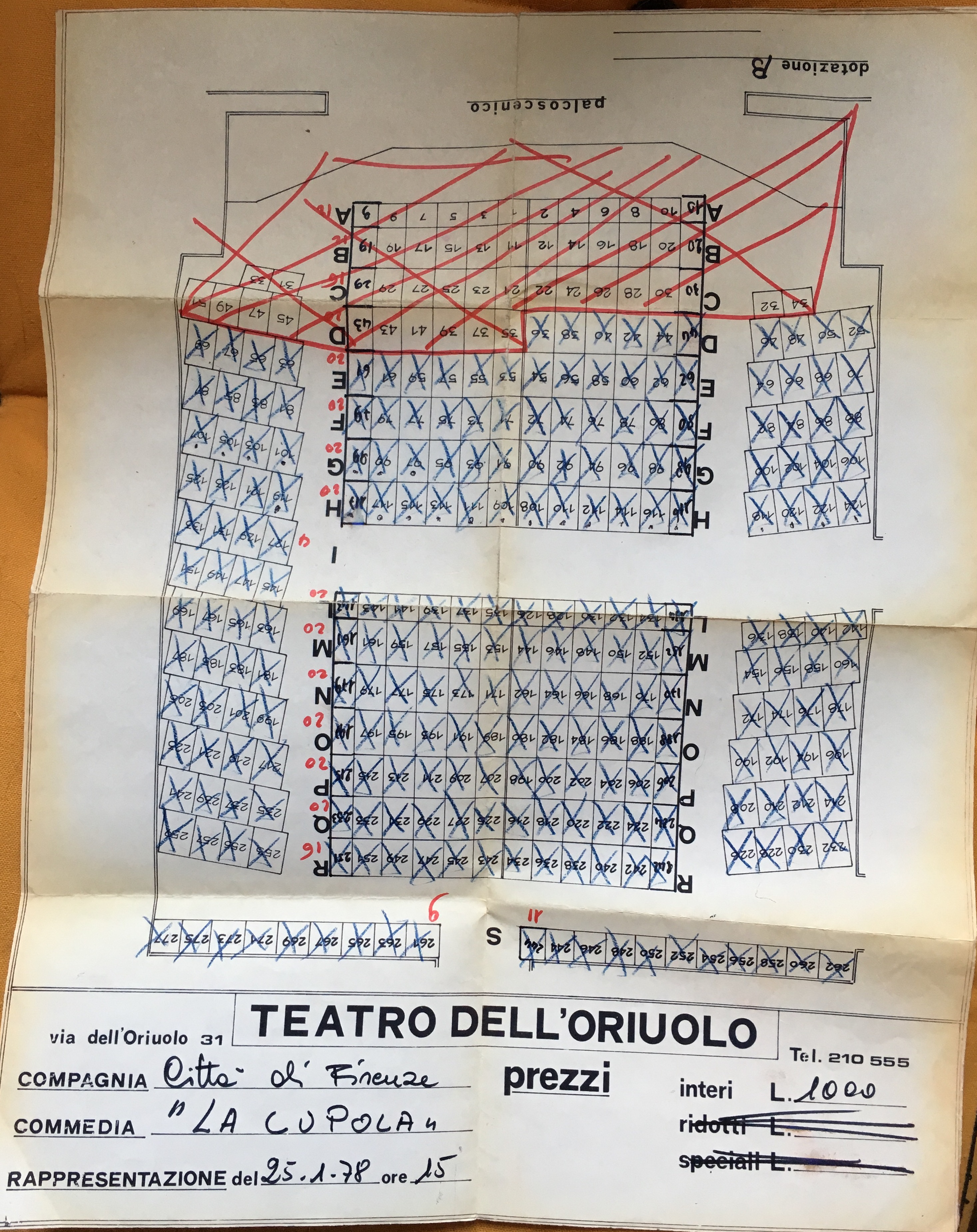
A plan of the Oriuolo Theatre

In the courtyard of Palazzo Bastogi was housed, from 1951 to 1993, the Teatro dell’Oriuolo, one of the most important theatres of post-war Florence. Built in wood around 1950 with a capacity of about 150 seats, it was later enlarged with dressing rooms and workshops on the initiative of the Acli-Municipal Employees' Association that had supported its creation, reaching three hundred seats. Already Stable Theatre with an important programme, featuring directors of the calibre of Tatiana Pavlova and actors such as Paola Borboni, Ottavia Piccolo, Ave Ninchi, the brothers Aldo Giuffrè and Carlo Giuffrè, Giustino Durano, Arnoldo Foà, etc.

After being damaged by fire and the Florence Flood of 1966, from 1968 the theatre became a reference point for the staging of prose shows in vernacular 'noble', as well as the seat of an appreciated acting school, under the direction of Gino Susini.

In 1993, the structure was closed due to inadequate plant engineering and the presence of a Asbestos roof. In 2002, a protocol was signed between the Eti, the Municipality and the University that envisaged an intervention to restore the structure (a project by Francesco Gurrieri with Giuseppe Fialà and Prof. Nizzi Grifi) aimed at turning it into an experimental theatre within the University of Florence’s Department of Arts and Performing Arts, which would in any case be open and usable by the city. After ten years, the theatre was returned in 2013 by the University to the City Council, with the aim of a new intervention aimed at the establishment of a directional and cultural centre with a hall for 140 seats, designed by Francesco Gurrieri himself.

In 2019, work actually began on the construction of the new Visual Arts Theatre; work that includes the complete demolition of the part built in the 1950s, devoid of any historical value (completed in April 2021), the recovery of the 18th-century part on Via dell’Oriuolo and the insertion of a light structure in the courtyard, that can be dismantled and reused for virtual representations of digital arts as part of the «Grandi Oblate» project.

== Notes ==
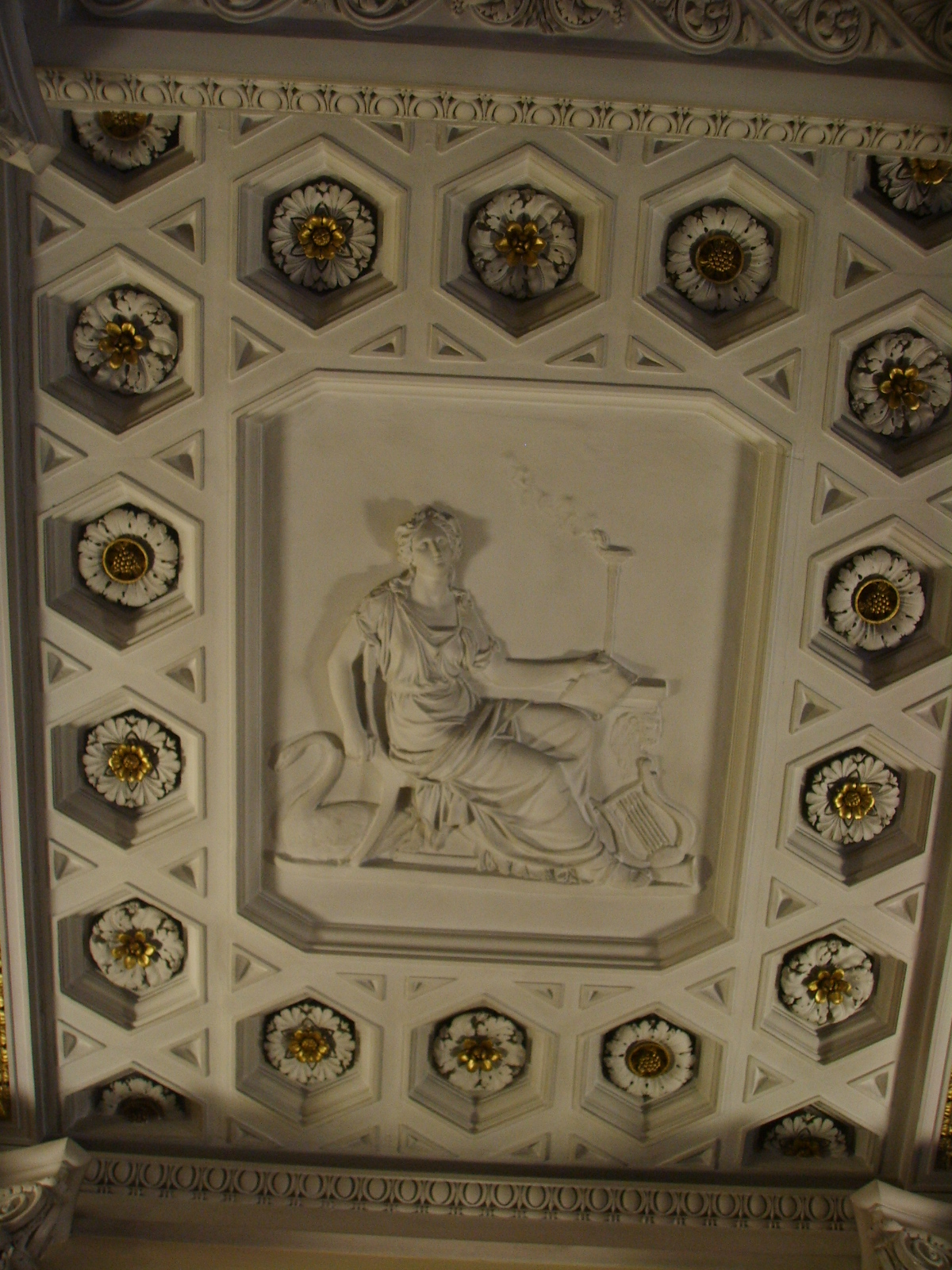
Stucco

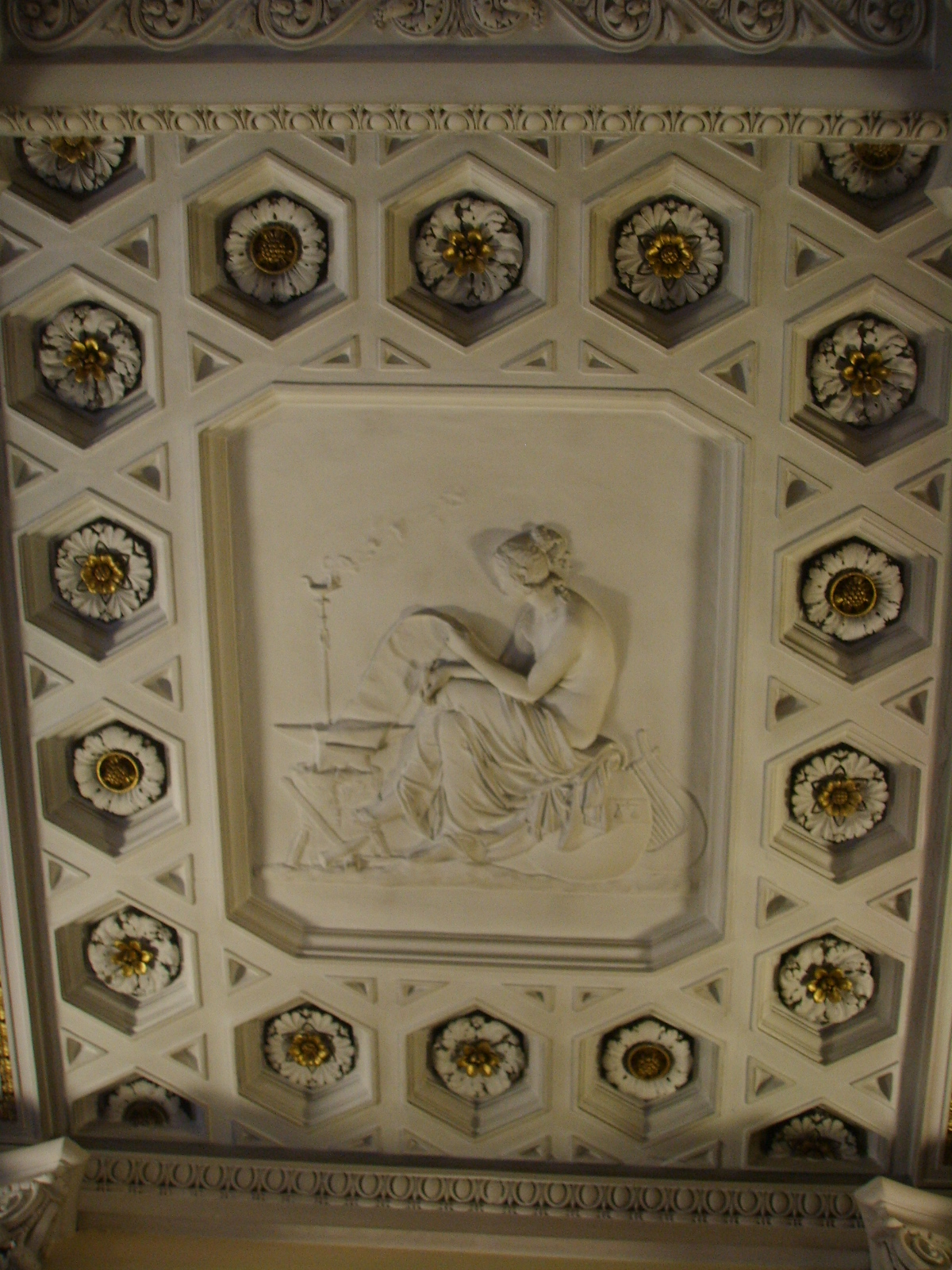
Stucco

== Bibliography ==
=== Italian sources ===
- Ristretto delle cose più notabili della città di Firenze del dottor Raffaello del Bruno, Firenze, Moucke, 1757, p. 30;
- Gaetano Cambiagi, L'antiquario fiorentino; o sia, Guida per osservar con metodo le cose notabili della città di Firenze, Firenze, Stamperia Imperiale, 1765, pp. 46–47;
- Gaetano Cambiagi, L'antiquario fiorentino o sia Guida per osservar con metodo le cose notabili della città di Firenze, Firenze, Stamperia Granducale, 1771, p. 46;
- Gaetano Cambiagi, L'antiquario fiorentino, o sia, Guida per osservar con metodo le cose notabili della citta di Firenze, Firenze, Stamperia Granducale, 1781, pp. 42–43;
- Nuova guida della città di Firenze ossia descrizione di tutte le cose che vi si trovano degne d’osservazione, con piante e vedute, ultima edizione compilata da Giuseppe François, Firenze, Vincenzo Bulli, 1850, p. 235;
- Ministero della Pubblica Istruzione (Direzione Generale delle Antichità e Belle Arti), Elenco degli Edifizi Monumentali in Italia, Roma, Tipografia ditta Ludovico Cecchini, 1902, p. 252;
- I Palazzi fiorentini. Quartiere di San Giovanni, introduzione di Piero Bargellini, schede dei palazzi di Marcello Jacorossi, Firenze, Comitato per l’Estetica Cittadina, 1972, p. 195, n. 374;
- Piero Bargellini, Ennio Guarnieri, Le strade di Firenze, 4 voll., Firenze, Bonechi, 1977-1978, II, 1977, p. 350;
- Stefano Bertocci, I disegni dell'Archivio Storico Comunale di Firenze, Firenze, Edizioni Polistampa, 1998, p. 257, n. 323;
- Daniele Gualandi in Comune di Firenze, Assessorato Cultura-Servizio Belle Arti, Quaderni di restauro. II, a cura di Valerio Cantafio Casamaggi, Carlo Francini, Natale Leuzzi, Firenze, Tip. G. Capponi, 2000, pp. 70–71;
- Francesco Cesati, La grande guida delle strade di Firenze, Newton Compton Editori, Roma 2004.
- Sara Benzi in Atlante del Barocco in Italia. Toscana / 1. Firenze e il Granducato. Province di Grosseto, Livorno, Pisa, Pistoia, Prato, Siena, a cura di Mario Bevilacqua e Giuseppina Carla Romby, Roma, De Luca Editori d’Arte, 2007, p. 406, n. 76;
- Claudio Paolini, Case e palazzi nel quartiere di Santa Croce a Firenze, Firenze, Paideia, 2008, p. 136, n. 204;
- Claudio Paolini, Architetture fiorentine. Case e palazzi nel quartiere di Santa Croce, Firenze, Paideia, 2009, pp. 204–205, n. 284
