= Wedding Day (film) =

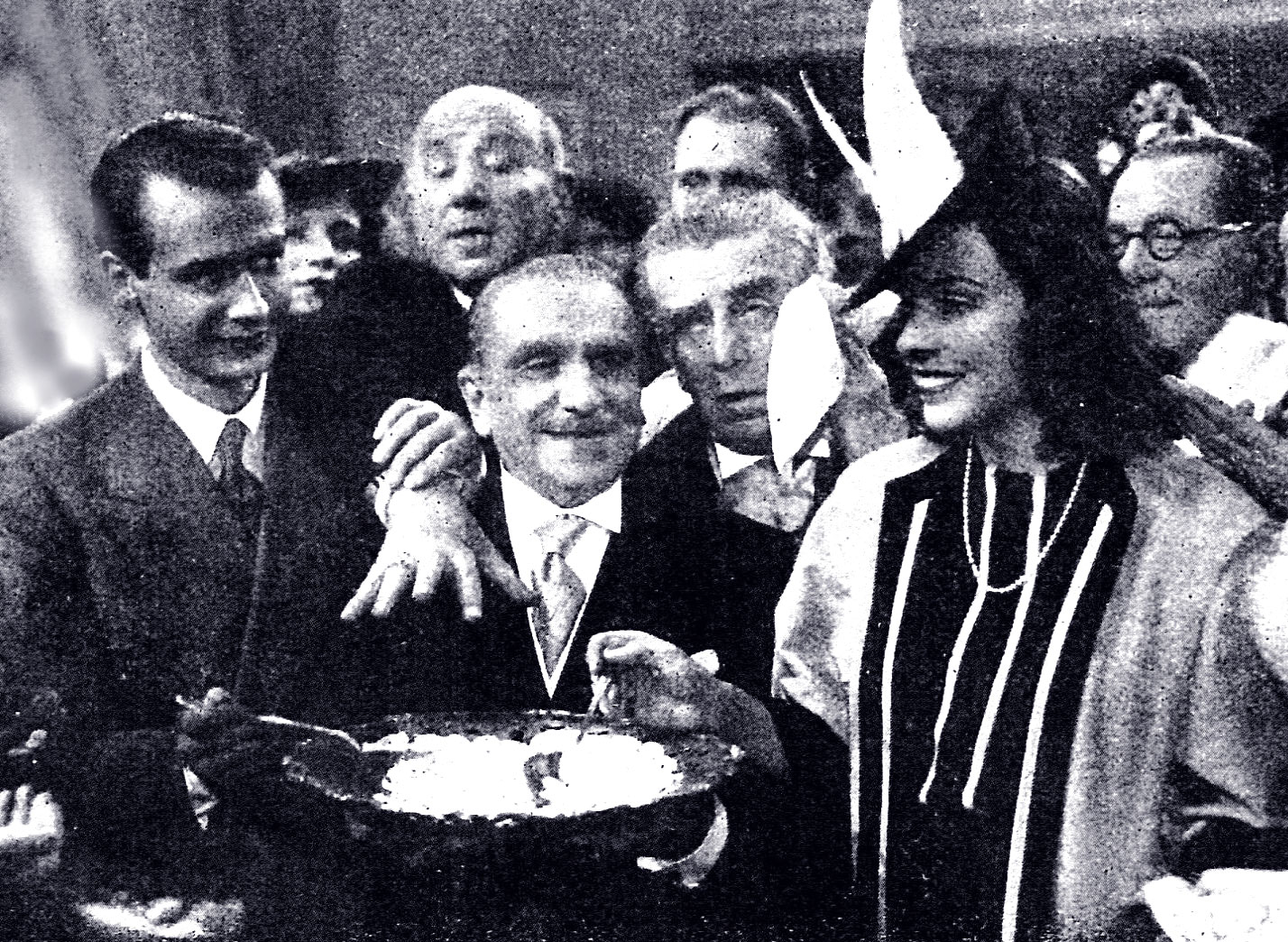
- Directed by: Raffaello Matarazzo
- Written by: Aldo De Benedetti; Raffaello Matarazzo; Paola Riccora (play)
- Starring: Armando Falconi; Amelia Chellini; Anna Proclemer
- Cinematography: Mario Albertelli; Arturo Gallea
- Edited by: Mario Serandrei
- Music by: Nino Rota
- Production company: Lux Film
- Distributed by: Lux Film
- Release date: 28 September 1942
- Running time: 85 minutes
- Country: Italy
- Language: Italian

Wedding Day (Italian: Giorno di nozze) is a 1942 Italian "white-telephones" comedy film directed by Raffaello Matarazzo and starring Armando Falconi, Amelia Chellini and Anna Proclemer.

It was shot at the Cinecitta Studios in Rome. The film's sets were designed by the art directors Gastone Medin and Gino Brosio.

== Partial cast ==
- Armando Falconi as Mariano Bonotti
- Amelia Chellini as Amalia - Mariano's wife
- Anna Proclemer as Mariella Bonotti
- Roberto Villa as Giorgio Birolli
- Antonio Gandusio as Amedeo Birolli
- Paola Borboni as Elena - Amedeo's wife
- Chiaretta Gelli as Marisa Birolli - Amedeo's daughter

== Bibliography ==
- Gundle, Stephen. Mussolini's Dream Factory: Film Stardom in Fascist Italy. Berghahn Books, 2013.
