= A Lady Did It =

1938 film

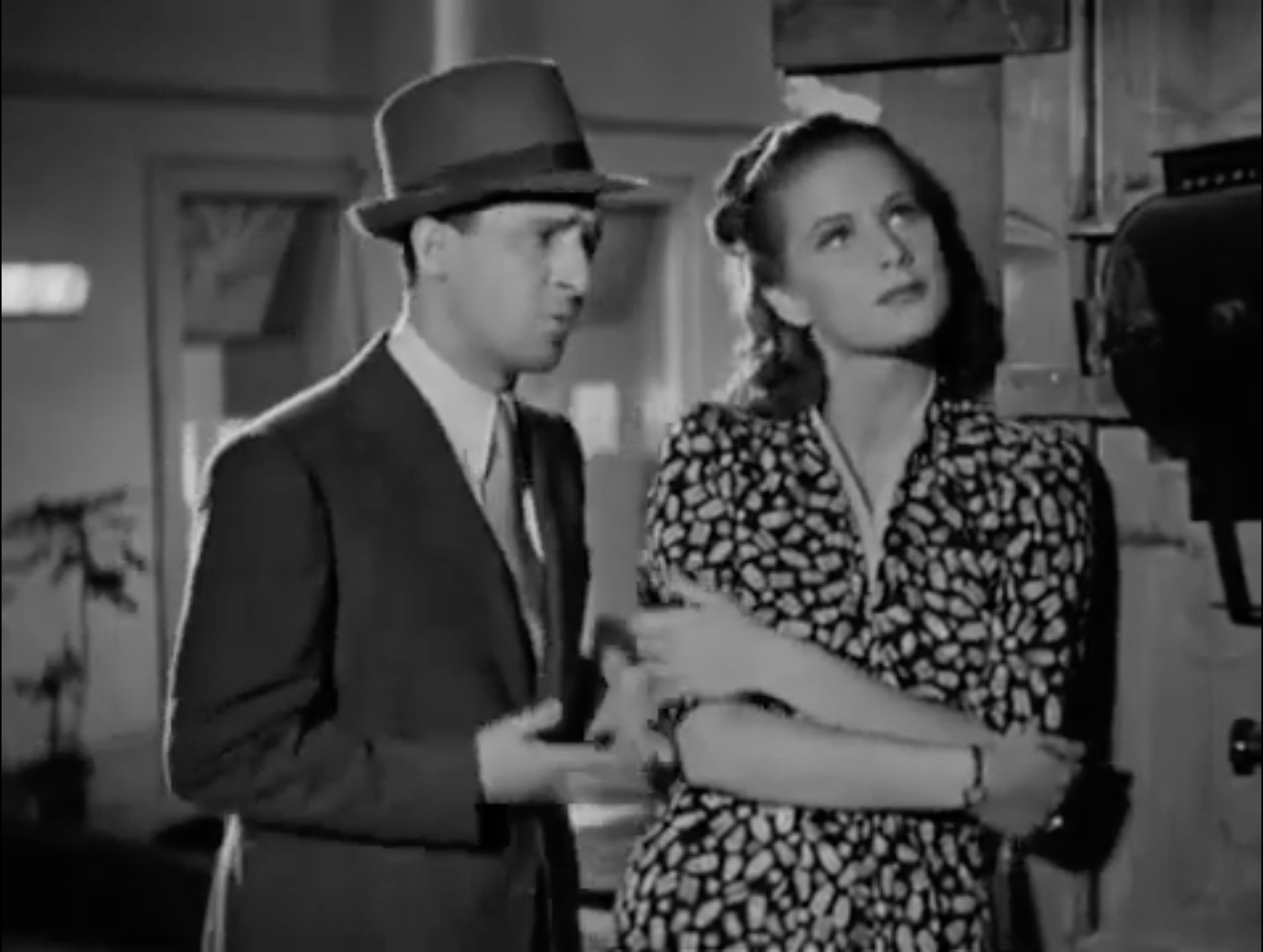
- Taranto and Valli in a film scene
- Directed by: Mario Mattoli
- Written by: Pio De Flaviis; Maria Ermolli; Guglielmo Giannini; Mario Mattoli
- Starring: Michele Abruzzo; Rosina Anselmi; Alida Valli
- Cinematography: Carlo Montuori
- Edited by: Fernando Tropea
- Music by: Giulio Bonnard
- Production company: Industrie Cinematografiche Artistiche Romane
- Distributed by: Generalcine
- Release date: October 1938
- Running time: 75 minutes
- Country: Italy
- Language: Italian

A Lady Did It (Italian: L'ha fatto una signora) is a 1938 Italian "white-telephones" comedy film directed by Mario Mattoli and starring Michele Abruzzo, Rosina Anselmi and Alida Valli. It was shot at Cinecittà Studios in Rome. The film's sets were designed by the art director Alfredo Montori.

== Main cast ==
- Michele Abruzzo as Luca Sardo
- Rosina Anselmi as Rosa Sardo
- Alida Valli as Maria Sardo
- Nino Taranto as Nino
- Virgilio Riento as Pasquale
- Tina Pica as Teresa, la portinaia
- Nando Bruno as Un collego di Pasquale

== Bibliography ==
- Aprà, Adriano. The Fabulous Thirties: Italian cinema 1929-1944. Electa International, 1979.
