= Lasciate ogni speranza =

- Directed by: Gennaro Righelli
- Screenplay by: Riccardo Freda; Camillo Mariani dell'Aguillara; Edoardo Antonelli
- Based on: L'agonia di Schizzo by Athos Setti
- Starring: Antonio Gandusio; María Denis; Rosina Anselmi
- Cinematography: Carlo Montuori
- Music by: Cesare A. Bixio
- Production company: Juventus Film
- Distributed by: Juventus Film
- Release date: October 1937
- Running time: 84 minutes
- Country: Italy

Lasciate ogni speranza (transl. Abandon all hope) is a 1937 Italian comedy film directed by Gennaro Righelli and starring Antonio Gandusio, María Denis and Rosina Anselmi.

== Cast ==
- Antonio Gandusio as Pasquale Grifone
- María Denis as Gina Grifone
- Rosina Anselmi as Filomena Grifone
- Giorgio De Rege as Giovanni
- Guido De Rege as Arturo
- Elli Parvo as Gemma
- Maria Dominiani as Assunta
- Mario Siletti as Jack Hilton
- Angelo Bizzari
- Mario Colli
- Rocco D'Assunta
- Walter Grant
- Edwige Masing
- Giulio Mostocotto
- Luigi Pellegrini
- Edoardo Toniolo

== Production ==
Raffaele Colamonici hired Riccardo Freda as the screenwriter for the film, adapting the play L'agonia di Schizzo by Athos Setti. Freda would later dismiss the film and his other works of the era as "small comedies without any importance" Freda stated he wrote the film with his friend Edoardo Antonelli.

== Release ==
Lasciate ogni speranza was released in October 1937.
