= Armando Falconi =

Italian actor

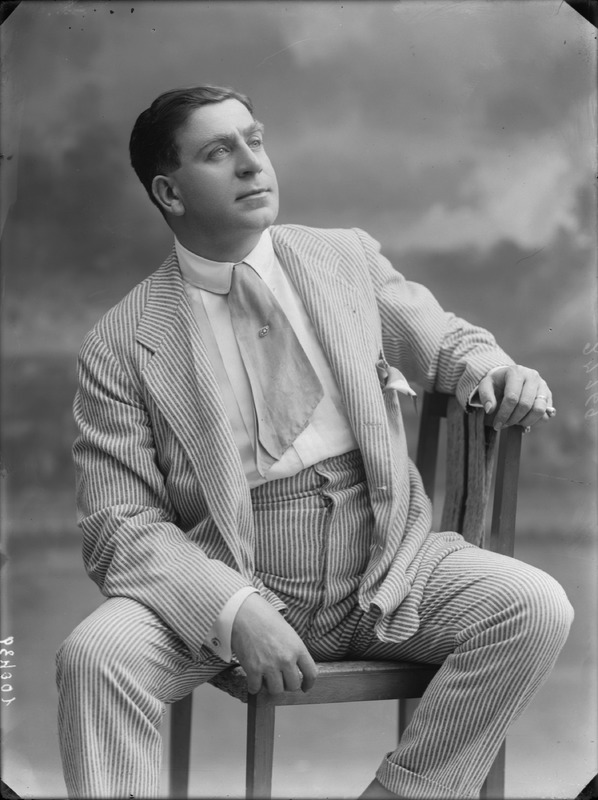
- Born: 10 July 1871; Rome, Lazio; Italy
- Died: 10 September 1954 (aged 83); Milan, Lombardy; Italy
- Occupation: Actor
- Years active: 1915-1944 (film)

Armando Falconi (1871–1954) was an Italian stage and film actor who appeared in more than forty films during his career. He played the lead in the 1931 comedy The Charmer.

== Life and career ==
Born in Rome, Falconi was the son of two Neapolitan stage actors. His elder brother Arturo Falconi also became an actor. He first worked as an employee and an officer before starting to work as a professional actor in the late 1890s. In 1901 he married the actress Tina Di Lorenzo, with whom he often teamed up on stage. Following several national and foreign tours, in 1912 he founded the Stable Company of the Manzoni Theatre in Milan. Following the retirement of his wife in 1920, he directed the company Compagnia Comoedia, and headed in a number of other companies, notably having a remarkable success with the musical comedy Wunder Bar. After having appeared in some silent films between 1915 and 1918, in the 1930s Falconi intensified his cinema activities, starring in a number of comedy films. Widowed since 1930, he remarried to actress Elisabetta Svoboda (also known with the stage name Lili Svett) in 1942. His son Dino Falconi was a screenwriter, director, journalist and playwright.

== Selected filmography ==
- The Charmer (1931)
- The Old Lady (1932)
- The Last Adventure (1932)
- Everybody's Secretary (1933)
- The Joker King (1935)
- Joe the Red (1936)
- The Carnival Is Here Again (1937)
- The Document (1939)
- The Sons of the Marquis Lucera (1939)
- The Birth of Salome (1940)
- Don Pasquale (1940)
- The Man on the Street (1941)
- The Betrothed (1941)
- Rossini (1942)
- Fourth Page (1942)
- Wedding Day (1944)
- The Innkeeper (1944)

== Bibliography ==
- Landy, Marcia. The Folklore of Consensus: Theatricality in the Italian Cinema, 1930-1943. SUNY Press, 2008.
