= Dino Falconi =

Italian screenwriter and film director

- Born: 18 September 1902; Livorno, Tuscany, Italy
- Died: 17 February 1990 (aged 87); Milan, Lombardy, Italy
- Occupations: Writer, Director
- Years active: 1931-1974

Dino Falconi (10 September 1902 – 17 February 1990) was an Italian screenwriter and film director. His parents were Armando Falconi and Tina Di Lorenzo, both actors. The actor Arturo Falconi was his uncle.

== Selected filmography ==
- The Charmer (1931)
- Television (1931)
- The Last Adventure (1932)
- One Night with You (1932)
- Everybody's Secretary (1933)
- Cardinal Lambertini (1934)
- Joe the Red (1936)
- Beggar's Wedding (1936)
- Big Shoes (1940)
- The Taming of the Shrew (1942)
- Songs in the Streets (1950)
- Miracle in Viggiù (1951)
- Gentlemen Are Born (1960)

== Bibliography ==
- Waldman, Harry. Missing Reels: Lost Films of American and European Cinema. McFarland, 2000.
