= The Flame That Will Not Die =

- Directed by: Vittorio Cottafavi
- Written by: Siro Angeli; Oreste Biancoli; Giorgio Capitani; Giuliano Conte; Vittorio Cottafavi; Mario Pagani; Fulvio Palmieri; Alberto Pozzetti; Franco Navarra Vigiani (novel)
- Produced by: Franco Navarra Vigiani
- Starring: Gino Cervi; María Denis; Leonardo Cortese
- Cinematography: Gábor Pogány
- Edited by: Renzo Lucidi
- Music by: Alessandro Cicognini
- Production company: Orsa Film
- Distributed by: ENIC
- Release date: 21 September 1949
- Running time: 95 minutes
- Country: Italy
- Language: Italian

The Flame That Will Not Die (Italian: Fiamma che non si spegne) is a 1949 Italian war drama film directed by Vittorio Cottafavi and starring Gino Cervi, María Denis and Leonardo Cortese. It is inspired by the story of Salvo D'Acquisto, a Carabinieri officer who died to save others from being executed by the Germans during the Second World War.

It was made at Cinecittà Studios. The film's sets were designed by Ottavio Scotti.

== Cast ==
- Gino Cervi as Luigi Manfredi
- María Denis as Maria
- Leonardo Cortese as Giuseppe Manfredi
- Luigi Tosi as Giovanni
- Carlo Campanini as Il zio di Maria
- Danielle Benson as Caterina
- Diana Benucci
- Siro Angeli
- Lorena Berg
- Nando Bruno
- Tino Buazzelli
- Vittorio Cottafavi
- Maurizio Di Nardo
- Giovanni Lovatelli
- Fulvia Mammi as Norina
- Carlo Mariotti
- Arnaldo Mochetti
- Diego Muni
- Dina Romano
- Gian Paolo Rosmino
- Gustavo Serena
- Barbara Vassarotti
- Gaio Visconti

== See also ==
- Salvo D'Acquisto (1974)

== Bibliography ==
- Guido Bonsaver & Robert Gordon. Culture, Censorship and the State in Twentieth-century Italy. European Humanities Research Centre, 2005.
