= The Matchmaker (1934 film) =

1934 Italian film by Amleto Palermi

- Directed by: Amleto Palermi
- Written by: Luigi Capuana (play); Amleto Palermi
- Produced by: Nuccio Fiorda
- Starring: Angelo Musco; Rosina Anselmi; Enrica Fantis
- Cinematography: Arturo Gallea
- Edited by: Amleto Palermi
- Music by: Umberto Mancini
- Production company: Ventura Film
- Distributed by: Artisti Associati
- Release date: 1934
- Running time: 80 minutes
- Country: Italy
- Language: Italian

The Matchmaker (Italian: Paraninfo) is a 1934 Italian comedy film directed by Amleto Palermi and starring Angelo Musco, Rosina Anselmi and Enrica Fantis.

== Cast ==
- Angelo Musco as Don Pasquale Minnedda
- Rosina Anselmi
- Enrica Fantis as Signora Minnedda
- Luisa Garella
- Carlo Petrangeli
- Camillo Pilotto as Il direttore della banda
- Francesco Amodio
- Alberto Angelini
- Ada Cannavò
- Eugenio Colombo
- Vera Dani
- María Denis
- Mariù Gleck
- Maria Jacobini
- Amedeo Vecci

== Bibliography ==
- Goble, Alan. The Complete Index to Literary Sources in Film. Walter de Gruyter, 1999.
