= Antonio Gandusio =

Italian actor (1875–1951)

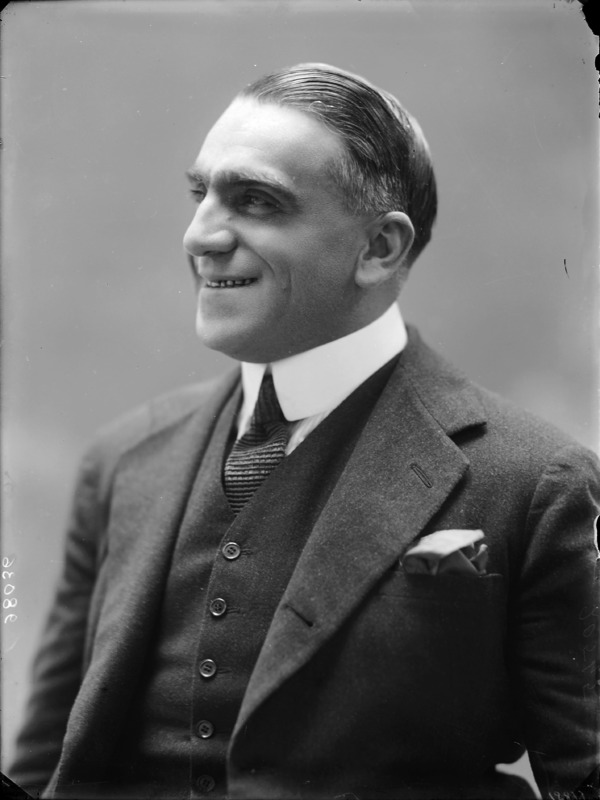
- Born: 29 July 1875; Rovigno, Dalmatia, Austria-Hungary
- Died: 23 May 1951 (aged 75); Milan, Italy
- Occupation: Actor
- Years active: 1914–1948

Antonio Gandusio (29 July 1875 – 23 May 1951) was an Italian film actor. He appeared in 34 films between 1914 and 1948. He was born in Rovigno (today Rovinj, Croatia) and died in Milan, Italy.

== Selected filmography ==
- The Story of a Poor Young Man (1920)
- Signora dell'Autobus (1933)
- Territorial Militia (1935)
- The Ancestor (1936)
- Adam's Tree (1936)
- Abandon All Hope (1937)
- For Men Only (1938)
- We Were Seven Sisters (1937)
- We Were Seven Widows (1939)
- Frenzy (1939)
- At Your Orders, Madame (1939)
- We Were Seven Widows (1939)
- Cose dell'altro Mondo (1939)
- Mille chilometri al minuto (1939)
- Manovre d'Amore (1940)
- Nothing New Tonight (1942)
- The Women Next Door (1942)
- Il Nostro prossimo (1942)
- Wedding Day (1942)
- Gioco d'azzardo (1942)
- Il viaggio del signor Perrichon (1943)
- La signora in nero (1943)
- La prigione (1943)
- Lively Teresa (1944)
- Three Girls Looking for Husbands (1944)
- Scadenza 30 giorni (1944)
- Processo delle zitelle (1944)
- La signora è servita (1946)
- La sconosciuta di San Marino (1946/48)
- L'orfanella delle stelle (1947)
- S.O.S. Submarine (1948)
- La sirena del golfo - Ma chi te lo fa fare? (1948/52)
- C'era una volta Angelo Musco (1953)
- La valigia dei sogni (1953)
