= God's Will Be Done =

- Directed by: Amleto Palermi
- Written by: Amleto Palermi
- Starring: Angelo Musco; María Denis; Sarah Ferrati
- Cinematography: Arturo Gallea
- Edited by: Fernando Tropea
- Music by: Umberto Mancini
- Production company: Artisti Associati
- Distributed by: Artisti Associati
- Release date: 1936
- Running time: 80 minutes
- Country: Italy
- Language: Italian

God's Will Be Done (Italian: Fiat voluntas dei) is a 1936 Italian comedy drama film directed by Amleto Palermi and starring Angelo Musco, María Denis and Sarah Ferrati.

== Cast ==
- Angelo Musco as Padre Attanasio
- María Denis as Anna
- Sarah Ferrati as Maddelena
- Amelia Chellini as Donna Maria Di Stefano
- Pina Renzi as La domestica
- Matilde Casagrande as Nina
- Nerio Bernardi as Il cavaliere Amendoli
- Eugenio Colombo as Battista
- Adolfo Geri as Paolino
- Vasco Creti as Don Matteo
- Enzo Colombo as Simeone
- Pino Locchi as Il bambino
- Dina Romano as Una donna del paese
- Amedeo Vecci

== Bibliography ==
- Aprà, Adriano. The Fabulous Thirties: Italian cinema 1929-1944. Electa International, 1979.
