= Tina Di Lorenzo =

Italian actress (1872–1930)

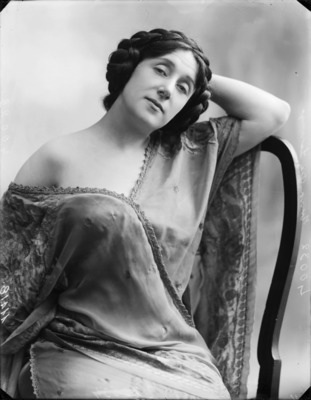
Tina Di Lorenzo, photographed by Mario Nunes Vais in about 1910

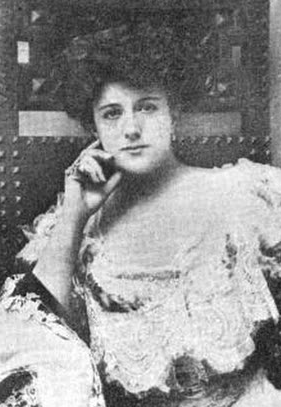
Tina Di Lorenzo, from a 1908 publication.

Tina Di Lorenzo (4 December 1872 — 25 March 1930) was an Italian actress on stage and in silent films.

== Early life ==
Concettina Di Lorenzo was born in Turin, the daughter of the Marquis Corrado Di Lorenzo and Amelia Colonnello. Her parents were both from Sicily; her mother was an actress, so young Tina was raised at her father's house in Noto.

== Career ==
Di Lorenzo started on the stage in her teens, sometimes acting with her mother. As a young woman, she joined the company of Francesco Pasta in 1890-1891, and then the company of Flavio Andò from 1897 to 1905. She toured abroad on several occasions, in Eastern Europe, Central America, and South America. From 1912 to 1914 she was a member of the Stabile del Teatro Manzoni in Milan. Her roles included Juliet, Camille, Zaza, and Pamela. She wore costumes by theatrical designer Luigi Sapelli.

She appeared in three Italian silent films,: La scintilla (1915, directed by Eleuterio Rodolfi), La bella mamma (1915, directed by Eleuterio Rodolfi) and La gorgona (1916, directed by Mario Caserini).

Di Lorenzo was already famous enough at age 24 to be the subject of a biography; Tina di Lorenzo: Cenni biografici e artici, by Camillo Antona-Traversi, was published in 1896. Another biography was published in 1906.

== Personal life ==
Tina Di Lorenzo married fellow actor Armando Falconi in 1901. They had a son together, Dino Falconi (1902-1990), who became a screenwriter and film director. She died in Milan in 1930, aged 57 years. Her gravesite is in the Cimitero Monumentale di Milano. There is a theatre in Noto named after her called Teatro Tina Di Lorenzo.
