= King of Diamonds (film) =

1936 film

King of The World
- A scene from the film with Angelo Musco (centre)
- Directed by: Enrico Guazzoni
- Written by: Sandro De Feo; Guglielmo Giannini
- Starring: Angelo Musco; Rosina Anselmi; Mario Pisu
- Cinematography: Ubaldo Arata
- Edited by: Ferdinando Maria Poggioli
- Music by: Ezio Carabella
- Production company: Capitani Film
- Release date: 1936
- Running time: 84 minutes
- Country: Italy
- Language: Italian

King of Diamonds or The Money King (Italian: Il re di denari) is a 1936 Italian "white-telephones" comedy film directed by Enrico Guazzoni and starring Angelo Musco, Rosina Anselmi, and Mario Pisu.

== Cast ==
- Angelo Musco as Don Paolo Marino
- Rosina Anselmi as Grazia Marino
- Mario Pisu as Franco
- Vanna Vanni as Paolina
- María Denis as Lola
- Ermanno Roveri as Totò
- Nerio Bernardi as L'avvocato Lorenzi
- Mario Ferrari as Conte Fabrizio di Grottaferrata
- Stefanella Ponti as La piccola Maria
- Nicola Maldacea as Il maggiordomo
- Ciro Galvani as Don Valerio Raspagliese
- Albertina Bianchini as Donna Bice
- Gino Viotti as L'avvocato Marziano
- Rocco D'Assunta as Don Cola - il sensale
- Aristide Garbini as Don Romolo - il padrone della pensione
- Renato Malavasi as Un cameriere dell'albergo
- Gustavo Serra
- Amelia Amorosi
- Rosina Adrario
- Vittoria Carpi
- Alfredo Fiorentini
- Antimo Reyner
- Amedeo Vecci
- Leda Gloria

== Bibliography ==
- Goble, Alan. The Complete Index to Literary Sources in Film. Walter de Gruyter, 1999.
