= The Birth of Salome =

1940 film

- Directed by: Jean Choux
- Written by: Jean Choux; Cesare Meano
- Based on: The Birth of Salome by Cesare Meano
- Produced by: Andrea Di Robilant; Augusto Turati
- Starring: Conchita Montenegro; Armando Falconi; Nerio Bernardi
- Cinematography: Carlo Montuori
- Edited by: Vincenzo Zampi
- Music by: Alessandro Cicognini
- Production companies: Duro Films; Stella Film
- Distributed by: Industrie Cinematografiche Italiane
- Release date: 13 July 1940
- Running time: 77 minutes
- Countries: Italy; Spain
- Language: Italian

The Birth of Salome (Italian: La nascita di Salomè, Spanish: El nacimiento de Salomé) is a 1940 Italian-Spanish comedy film directed by Jean Choux and starring Conchita Montenegro, Armando Falconi and Nerio Bernardi. It was shot at the Cinecittà Studios in Rome. The film's sets were designed by the art directors Giorgio Pinzauti and Ivo Battelli.

== Cast ==
- Conchita Montenegro as Deliah
- Armando Falconi as Aristobulo
- Fernando Freyre de Andrade as Mardocheo
- Nerio Bernardi as Il re dei Parti
- María Gámez as Salomè
- Luis Peña as Kadòr, l'ambasciatore
- Primo Carnera as Il lottatore
- Marika Spada as Un'ancella
- Salvatore Furnari as Il nano
- Emilio Gutiérrez
- Miguel Pozanco
- Giorgio Gentile
- Iginia Armilli
- Ugo Pozzi
- Vanda Martínez
- Alda Perosino
- Loredana
- Bebi Nucci
- Tony D'Algy
- Irene Caba Alba
- José Portes

== Bibliography ==
- Goble, Alan. The Complete Index to Literary Sources in Film. Walter de Gruyter, 1999.
- Rège, Philippe. Encyclopedia of French Film Directors, Volume 1. Scarecrow Press, 2009.
