= The Amnesiac =

1936 film

- Directed by: Gennaro Righelli
- Written by: Emilio Caglieri (play); Sandro De Feo; Ivo Perilli; Guglielmo Giannini
- Starring: Angelo Musco; Checco Durante; Franco Coop
- Cinematography: Ubaldo Arata
- Edited by: Fernando Tropea
- Music by: Cesare A. Bixio; Armando Fragna
- Production company: Capitani Film
- Distributed by: Variety Distribution
- Release date: 3 November 1936
- Running time: 79 minutes
- Country: Italy
- Language: Italian

The Amnesiac (Italian: Lo smemorato) is a 1936 Italian comedy film directed by Gennaro Righelli and starring Angelo Musco, Checco Durante and Franco Coop. The film's plot is based on a stage play, inspired by the Bruneri-Canella case. It was shot at Cines Studios in Rome. The film's sets were designed by the art director Mario Rappini.

== Cast ==
- Angelo Musco as Domenico Mondini
- Checco Durante as L'allenatore Marinoni
- Franco Coop as Salvatore, l'amministratore
- Loris Gizzi as Mario Tiana
- Mario Colli as Nello Salucci
- Paola Borboni as Erminia Nardelli-Buzzi
- Amelia Chellini as Agata, la suocera di Domenico
- Luisa Ferida as Giulietta
- Pina Renzi as Amalia Mondini, la moglie di Domenico
- Vittorio Tamagnini as Se stesso
- Renato Alberini as Lo sposino dal 'Club delle Ondine'
- Giulio Alfieri as Cirillo, il presidente onorario
- Amelia Amorosi as La presidentessa
- Virgilio Botti as Giacomozzi
- Lilla Brignone as La sposina al 'Club delle Ondine'
- Wanda Buratti as Josette
- Vittoria Carpi as Un'invitata al pranzo
- Luigi Erminio D'Olivo as Il medico
- Eva Magni as La nipote di Erminia
- Ugo Sasso as Un atleta
- Nietta Zocchi as Zelinda

== Bibliography ==
- Goble, Alan. The Complete Index to Literary Sources in Film. Walter de Gruyter, 1999.
