= Joe the Red =

1936 film

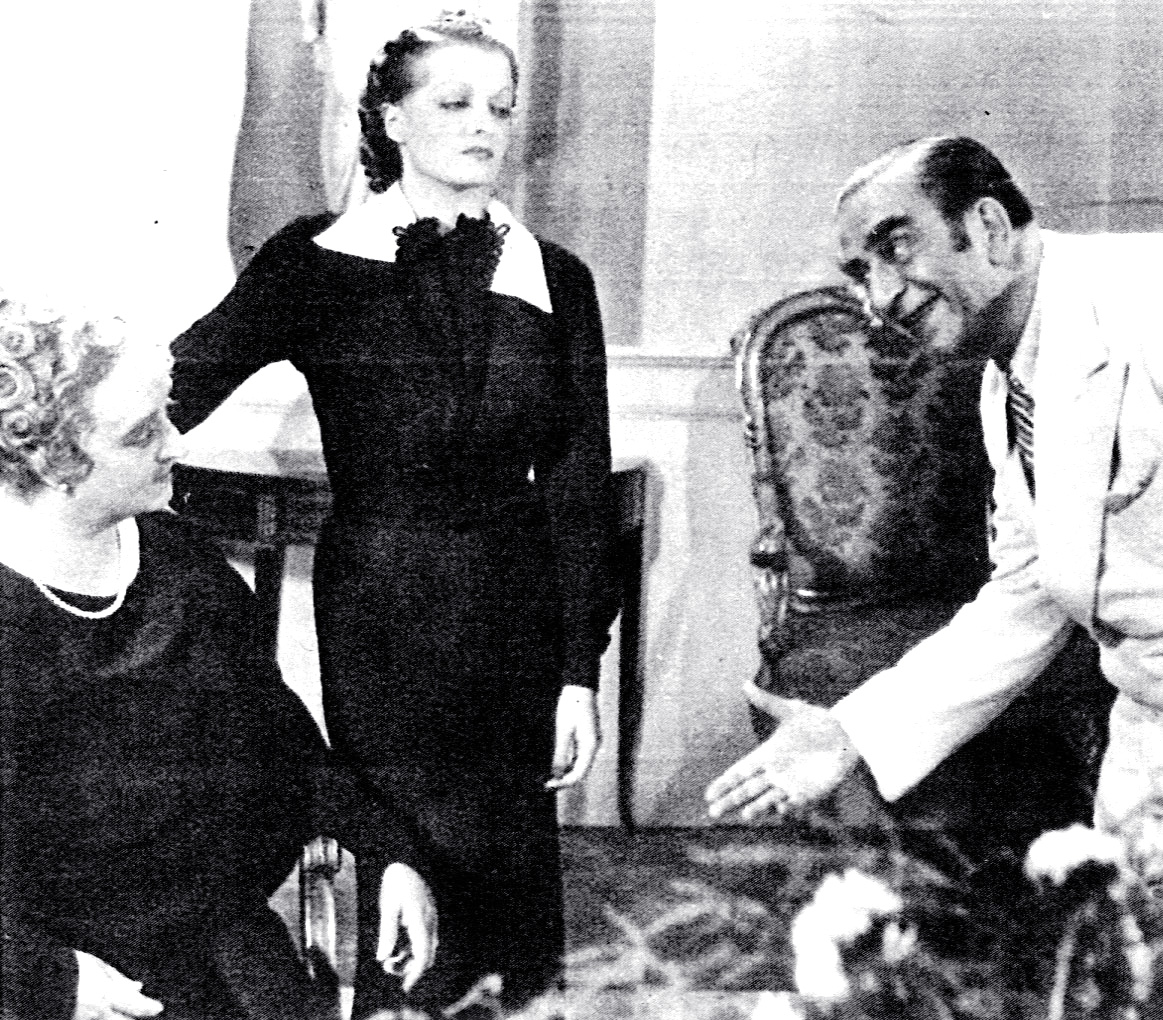
- Directed by: Raffaello Matarazzo
- Written by: Dino Falconi (play); Guglielmo Giannini
- Starring: Armando Falconi; Luisa Garella; Ada Dondini
- Cinematography: Massimo Terzano
- Edited by: Fernando Tropea
- Music by: Giovanni Fusco; Umberto Mancini
- Production company: Lupa Film
- Release date: 7 December 1936
- Running time: 88 minutes
- Country: Italy
- Language: Italian

Joe the Red (Italian: Joe il rosso) is a 1936 Italian comedy crime film directed by Raffaello Matarazzo and starring Armando Falconi, Luisa Garella and Ada Dondini.

The film's sets were designed by the art director Gastone Medin.

== Cast ==
- Armando Falconi as Joe Mark / Joe il Rosso
- Luisa Garella as Marta Sandelle-Lafitte
- Ada Dondini as Duchess Sofia di Sandelle-Lafitte
- Barbara Monis as Annamaria
- Aristide Baghetti as Gontrano Sandelle.Lafitte
- María Denis as Marietta Clavel
- Luigi Pavese as Stefano Sandelle-Lafitte
- Angelo Bizzari as Giuliano lo spagnolo
- Maria Dominiani as Ziska
- Cesare Zoppetti as Ruggero d'Arment
- Emilio Petacci as The detective
- Remo Lotti as Germano il maggiordomo
- Ugo Sasso as Un gangster

== Bibliography ==
- Aprà, Adriano. The Fabulous Thirties: Italian Cinema 1929-1944. Electa International, 1979.
