= The Last Adventure (1932 film) =

1932 film

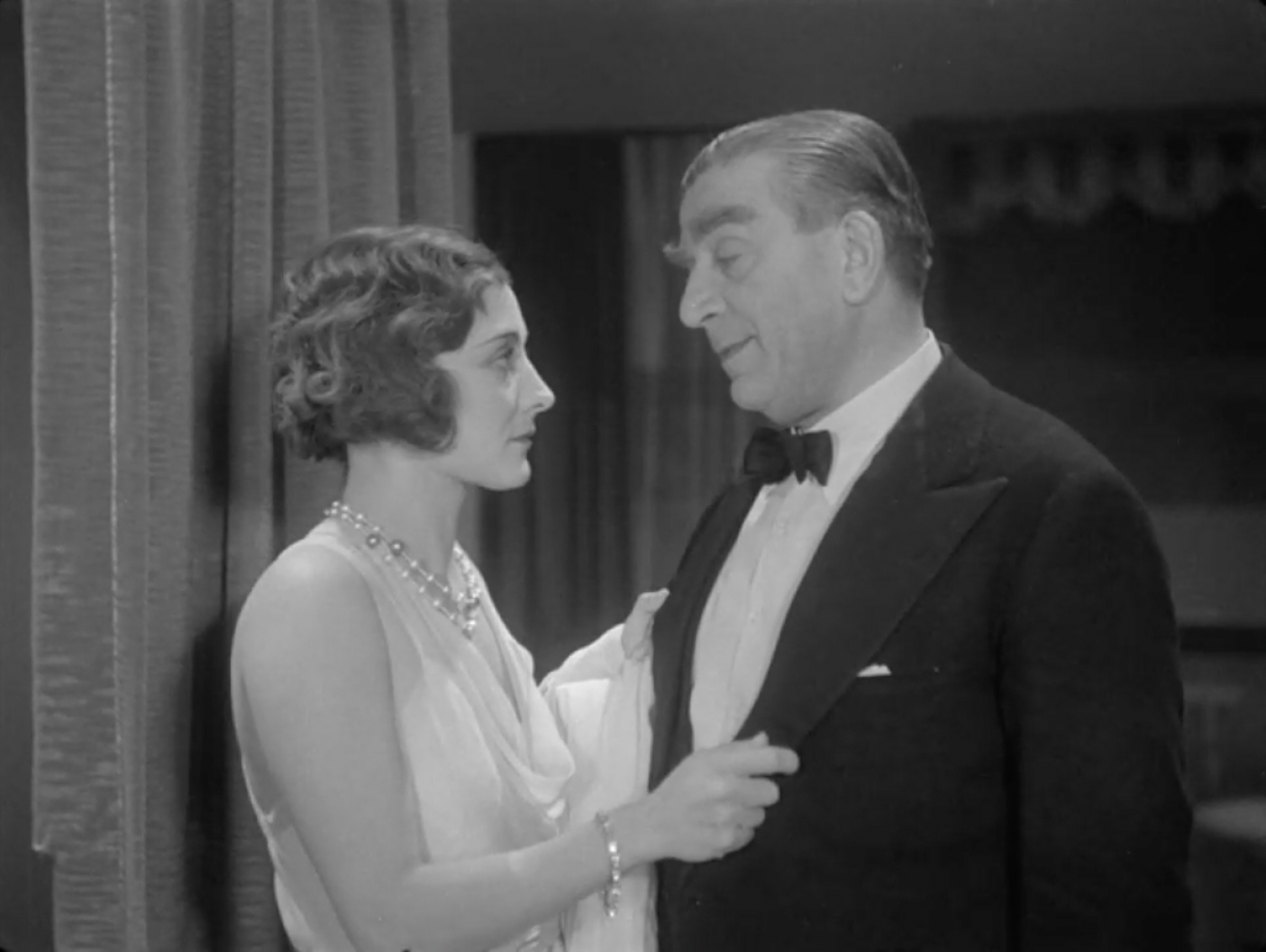
- Jacobini and Falconi in a film scene
- Directed by: Mario Camerini
- Written by: Oreste Biancoli; Mario Camerini; Dino Falconi; Tomaso Smith
- Starring: Armando Falconi; Diomira Jacobini
- Cinematography: Ubaldo Arata
- Edited by: Mario Camerini; Giuseppe Fatigati
- Music by: Ezio Carabella
- Production company: Società Italiana Cines
- Distributed by: Società Italiana Cines
- Release date: 1932
- Running time: 74 minutes
- Country: Italy
- Language: Italian

The Last Adventure (Italian: L'ultima avventura) is a 1932 Italian comedy film directed by Mario Camerini, starring Armando Falconi and Diomira Jacobini.

The film's sets were designed by the art director Gastone Medin.

== Cast ==
- Armando Falconi as Armando
- Diomira Jacobini as Lilly
- Carlo Fontana as Paolo
- Cesare Zoppetti as Battista
- Nella Maria Bonora as Luisa
- Giovanni Dolfini as Carlo - il cognato medico
- Elisa Masi
- Rossana Masi
- Gemma Schirato as La zia
- Elena Zoar as Giulia
- Guglielmo Barnabò as Don Luigi - il prete
- Ciro Galvani as Il padre di Paolo
- Maria Della Lunga Mandarelli as Adriana
- Pino Locchi as Giorgetto
- Mino Doro
- Gianfranco Giachetti
- Isa Pola as Una ragazza di Rapallo
- Carlo Romano as Don Gaetano - il notaio

== Bibliography ==
- Mark Shiel. Italian Neorealism: Rebuilding the Cinematic City. Columbia University Press, 2012.
