= Mille chilometri al minuto! =

1939 film

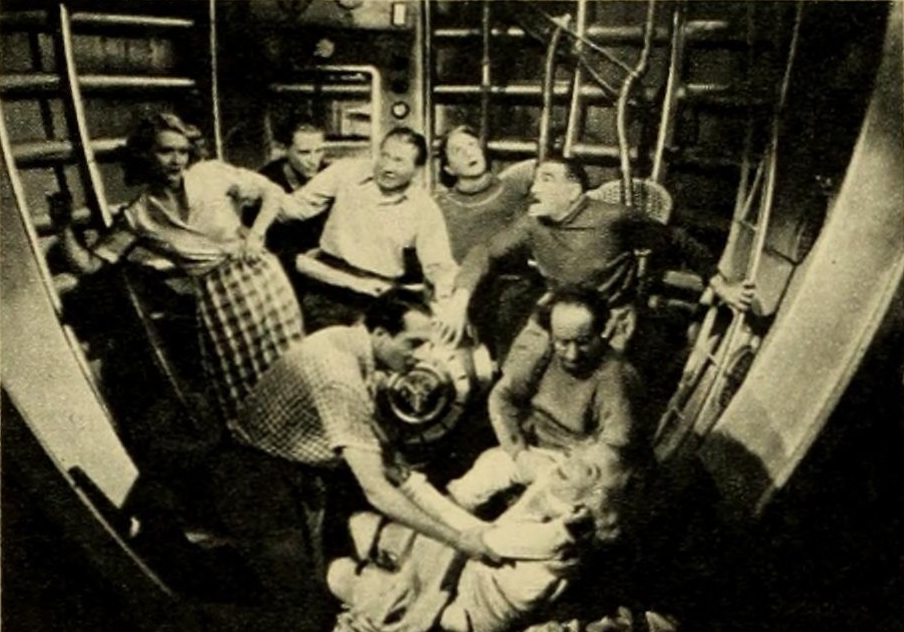
- Production still
- Directed by: Mario Mattoli
- Written by: Aldo De Benedetti; Mario Mattoli
- Produced by: Alfredo Villetti
- Starring: Nino Besozzi; Antonio Gandusio; Vivi Gioi
- Cinematography: Domenico Scala
- Edited by: Mario Mattoli
- Distributed by: Industrie Cinematografiche Italiane
- Release date: 21 December 1939
- Running time: 80 minutes
- Country: Italy
- Language: Italian

Mille chilometri al minuto! (or 1000 km al minuto!) is a 1939 Italian "white-telephones" comedy film directed by Mario Mattoli and starring Nino Besozzi.

== Plot ==
Paolo Fabbrini is on a shopping trip for his wife when he runs into an acquaintance, Guido Renzi. Renzi notices that a woman has dropped her purse, and goes with Fabbrini to return it. They pursue her for a long time, following her down to the lakeshore at evening just to see her speed away in a motorboat toward an island. Fabbrini does not want to follow, but Renzi insists. When they reach the island, they are chased by guard dogs and enter a secret lab to escape them. Inside, a group of scientists is preparing to launch a rocket to Mars. The woman, Diana, is one of the scientists, who decide as a group to conduct experiments on Renzi and Fabbrini so they can bring them along.

Lake water is allowed to flow into the volcano beneath the island in order to trigger the explosion to launch the rocket. The explosion is felt for miles. Afterward, a radio message the scientists had left broadcasts the names of the expedition members, including Fabbrini and Renzi. Hearing the news, some of Fabbrini's relatives fabricate stories of his having studied astronomy in order to capitalize on Fabbrini's newfound fame.

Aboard the rocket, the expedition's leader, Professor Elios, is distracted and swallows several pills filled with alcohol. These were part of the "concentrated" rations, and the scientists realize that the mistake might set them adrift in space rather than reaching Mars.

Meanwhile, Fabbrini's and Renzi's fame erupts, inspiring songs and variety shows dedicated to them.

In space, the rocket is drawn into the gravitational pull of a celestial body. Parachutes are deployed to slow its descent, and it splashes into an unknown body of water. Fabbrini is made to leave the ship to determine if the air is breathable. After a time of hearing nothing from Fabbrini, Renzi goes out to save him only to find that Fabbrini is fine – he has merely dropped the hammer he is meant to use to bang on the ship's hull to signal that he is alive.

Professor Elios is still unconscious, and is therefore unable to determine where they've landed. No one else is capable of this feat. The rocket drifts to shore where the group loos for shelter. Renzi manages to get a radio working and picks up a transmission from Rome playing the song "Let's All Go to Mars" that had been dedicated to their mission.

Professor Elios finally regains consciousness and tells them that they have landed on Mars, but two security guards arrive. The group has landed in a restricted area and the guards call the police to have them all arrested. The group has safely landed on Earth.

Fabbrini returns home to find a plaque listing him as a "heroic aviator" is being unveiled. Some time later, he is out once more shopping for his wife when he runs into Renzi and Diana, who are buying an abacus for Professor Elios's new expedition.

== Cast ==
In alphabetical order:

- Nerio Bernardi as another scientist
- Nino Besozzi as Guido Renzi, an engineer
- Enzo Biliotti as Arturo Zucchi, Paolo's cousin
- Lola Braccini as Mrs. Fabbrini
- Amelia Chellini as Dr. Anna Ivanoff
- Romolo Costa as Professor Pierro Lorenz
- Giovanni Dolfini as another scientist
- Mario Ersanilli as Professor Otto Elios
- Jone Frigerio as Aunt Henrietta
- Antonio Gandusio as Paolo Fabbrini, a lawyer
- Vivi Gioi as Diana Elios, the professor's daughter
- Cesare Polacco as a security guard
- Aroldo Tieri as another of Paolo's cousins
- Franca Volpini as a waitress (as Flora Volpini)

== Production ==
Aldo De Benedetti co-wrote the script. Piero Filippone designed the set. Mario Mattoli directed the film, with Domenico Scala as the director of photography.

== Sources ==
- Stewart, John (1994). Italian Film: A Who's Who. Jefferson, NC: McFarland & Company. ISBN 0-89950-761-1. LCCN 93-38733 – via Internet Archive.
- Tulard, Jean (2007). Dictonnaire du Cinéma: Les Réalisateurs [Film Dictionary: Directors] (in French). Paris: Éditions Robert Laffont. ISBN 978-2-221-10832-1 – via Internet Archive.
