= Rosina Anselmi =

Italian actress (1880–1965)

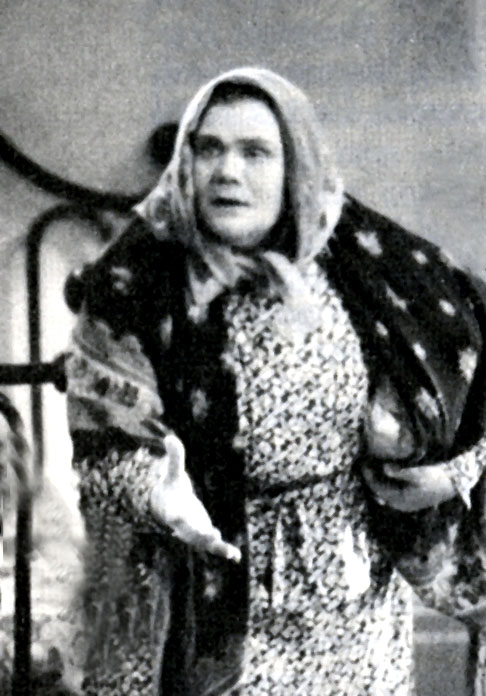
- Born: 26 July 1880; Caltagirone, Catania, Kingdom of Italy
- Died: 23 May 1965 (aged 84); Catania, Italy
- Occupation: Actress

Rosina Anselmi (26 July 1880 – 23 May 1965) was an Italian stage, television and film actress. She was a prominent actress in the Sicilian language theater, especially in the province of Catania.

== Life and career ==
Born in Caltagirone, Catania into a family of stage actors, Anselmi began acting with her father Alessandro, then with Nino Martoglio in some comedies written by him. She then joined the stage company of Mimi Aguglia, another important actress of the Sicilian repertoire, with whom she toured in North America. Anselmi went back to Sicily in 1910, and in 1914 she became the first actress, in spite of her status of a great character actress, alongside Angelo Musco with whom she acted for about thirty years, until Musco's death. Anselmi later continued her stage career next to Michele Abbruzzo, proposing the identical repertoire of Musco, until her death. She was a co-founder of the Teatro Stabile di Catania.

== Selected filmography ==
- The Matchmaker (1934)
- Aldebaran (1935)
- Territorial Militia (1935)
- King of Diamonds (1936)
- Lohengrin (1936)
- Abandon All Hope (1937)
- The Ferocious Saladin (1937)
- A Lady Did It (1938)
- The Marquis of Ruvolito (1939)
