= Luisa Garella =

Italian actress (1913–1983)

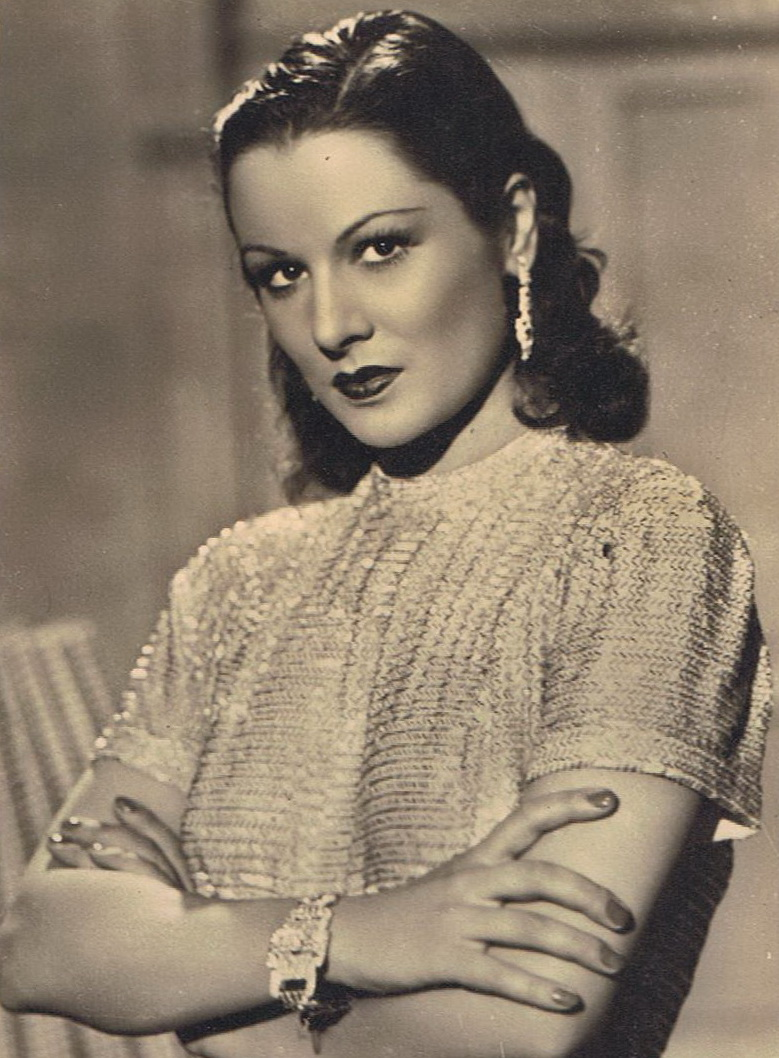
- Garella in the 1940s
- Born: Luisa Gargarella; 6 January 1913; Florence, Italy
- Died: 28 September 1983 (aged 70); Rome, Italy
- Occupation: Actress
- Years active: 1934-1943

Luisa Garella (born Luisa Gargarella, 6 January 1913 – 28 September 1983) was an Italian film actress who appeared in a number of films during the Fascist era.

Garella died in Rome on 28 September 1983, at the age of 70.

== Selected filmography ==
- The Matchmaker (1934)
- The Man Who Smiles (1936)
- Joe the Red (1936)
- The Former Mattia Pascal (1937)
- Scampolo (1941)
- The Last Dance (1941)
- Grattacieli (1943)
- Short Circuit (1943)

== Bibliography ==
- Goble, Alan. The Complete Index to Literary Sources in Film. Walter de Gruyter, 1999.
