= Amelia Chellini =

Italian actress (1880–1944)

- Chellini in the movie Full Speed (1934)
- Born: 16 June 1880; Florence, Kingdom of Italy
- Died: 31 May 1944 (aged 63); Rome, Kingdom of Italy
- Occupation: Actress
- Years active: 1912–1944

Amelia Chellini (16 June 1880 – 31 May 1944), was an Italian film actress. She appeared in 38 films between 1912 and 1944.

== Selected filmography ==
- Everybody's Secretary (1933)
- Bad Subject (1933)
- Full Speed (1934)
- La Damigella di Bard (1936)
- God's Will Be Done (1936)
- The Amnesiac (1936)
- We Were Seven Widows (1939)
- Mille chilometri al minuto (1939)
- Maddalena, Zero for Conduct (1940)
- The Brambilla Family Go on Holiday (1941)
- The Prisoner of Santa Cruz (1941)
- The Happy Ghost (1941)
- Tragic Night (1942)
- Measure for Measure (1943)
- Annabella's Adventure (1943)
- Wedding Day (1944)
