= Creatures of the Night (film) =

1934 film

- Directed by: Amleto Palermi
- Written by: Antonio Petrucci; Amleto Palermi
- Starring: Tatyana Pavlova; Isa Pola; María Denis
- Cinematography: Arturo Gallea
- Edited by: Amleto Palermi
- Music by: Umberto Mancini
- Production company: Caesar Film
- Distributed by: Caesar Film
- Release date: 1934
- Running time: 73 minutes
- Country: Italy
- Language: Italian

Creatures of the Night (Italian: Creature della notte) is a 1934 Italian drama film directed by Amleto Palermi and starring Tatyana Pavlova, Isa Pola and María Denis.

== Cast ==
- Tatyana Pavlova as L'ex-carcerate
- Isa Pola as Sua figlia
- María Denis as L'altra ragazza
- Dino Di Luca as Il mascalzone
- Isa Miranda as Una gigolette
- Piero Carnabuci as Il ricco gentiluomo
- Vasco Creti as Il cliente del Tabarin
- Osvaldo Valenti
- Fosco Giachetti
- Olinto Cristina
- Rocco D'Assunta
- Ernesto Torrini
- Carlo Chertier

== Bibliography ==
- Aprà, Adriano. The Fabulous Thirties: Italian cinema 1929-1944. Electa International, 1979.
