= Everybody's Secretary =

1933 film

- Directed by: Amleto Palermi
- Written by: Oreste Biancoli; Dino Falconi; Mario Mattoli; Amleto Palermi
- Produced by: Mario Mattoli
- Starring: Armando Falconi; Giuditta Rissone; Vittorio De Sica
- Cinematography: Arturo Gallea
- Edited by: Amleto Palermi
- Music by: Vittorio Mascheroni
- Production company: Za-Bum
- Distributed by: Artisti Associati
- Release date: 1933
- Running time: 88 minutes
- Country: Italy
- Language: Italian

Everybody's Secretary (Italian: La segretaria per tutti) is a 1933 Italian comedy film directed by Amleto Palermi and starring Armando Falconi, Giuditta Rissone and Vittorio De Sica. The film's sets were designed by the art director Giulio Frati. It features four sketches from the Za-Bum show and was shot entirely on location at the Teatro Argentina in Rome.

== Cast ==
- Armando Falconi
- Giuditta Rissone
- Vittorio De Sica
- Umberto Melnati
- Rina Franchetti
- Camillo Pilotto
- Franco Coop
- Pina Renzi
- Arturo Falconi
- Checco Rissone
- Amelia Chellini
- Rocco D'Assunta
- Ermanno Roveri
- Adele Carlucci
- Tino Erler
- Paola Giorgi

== Bibliography ==
- D'Amico, Masolino. La commedia all'italiana. Il cinema comico in Italia dal 1945 al 1975. Il Saggiatore, 2008.
- Fullwood, Natalie. Cinema, Gender, and Everyday Space: Comedy, Italian Style. Springer, 2015.
