= Anna Maria Dossena =

Italian stage and film actress

- Born: 17 February 1912; Massa Carrara, Tuscany, Italy
- Died: 18 June 1990 (aged 78); Rome, Lazio, Italy
- Occupation: Actress
- Years active: 1931-1989

Anna Maria Dossena (1912–1990) was an Italian stage and film actress.

== Selected filmography ==
- Television (1931)
- The Old Lady (1932)
- Music in the Square (1936)
- Lohengrin (1936)
- We Were Seven Sisters (1939)
- We Were Seven Widows (1939)
- Empty Eyes (1953)
- Il bambino e il poliziotto (1989)

== Bibliography ==
- Waldman, Harry. Missing Reels: Lost Films of American and European Cinema. McFarland, 2000.
