= Maria Dominiani =

Italian actress (1913–1993)

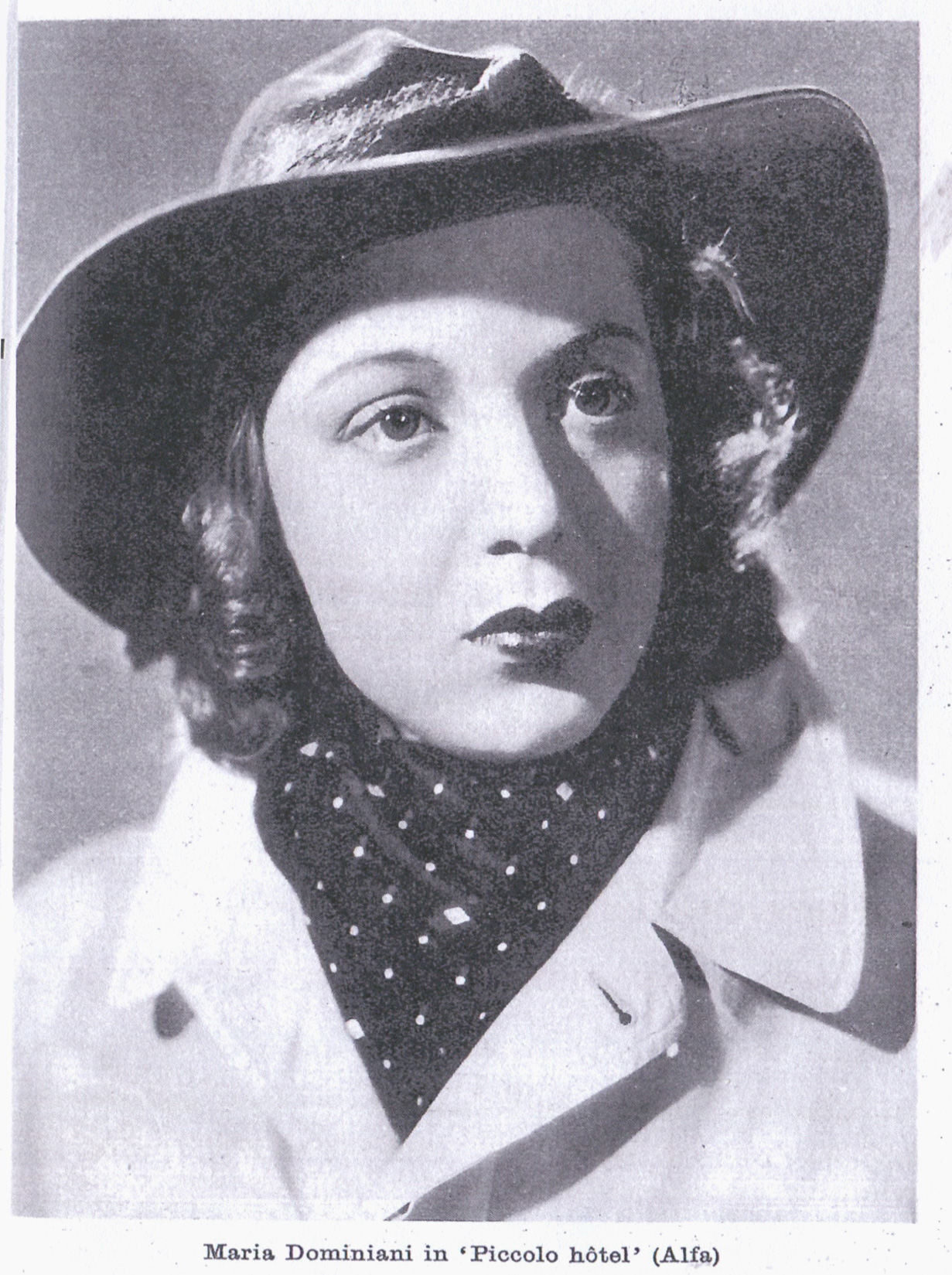
- Maria Dominiani in 1939
- Born: 10 May 1913; Genoa, Liguria, Italy
- Died: 10 December 1993 (aged 80); Rome, Italy
- Other names: Mariuccia Dominiani
- Occupation: Actress
- Years active: 1936–1961

Maria "Mariuccia" Dominiani (10 May 1913 – 10 December 1993) was an Italian actress.

== Biography ==
Dominiani made her debut on screen in the 1936 film Joe the Red, dedicating herself also to variety shows and photo comics in the following decade. In 1944, she was arrested and imprisoned, after being accused of having collaborated with the Nazis during the fascist regime but was released from prison because there was no evidence against her. In the 1950s, Dominiani dealt with organizing stage shows, and also played in minor roles in some films until 1961.

Dominiani died in Rome on 10 December 1993, at the age of 80.

== Partial filmography ==
- Joe the Red (1936)
- I've Lost My Husband! (1937)
- Lasciate ogni speranza (1937)
- We Were Seven Widows (1939)
- Inspector Vargas (1940)
- Caravaggio, il pittore maledetto (1941)
- A Woman Has Fallen (1941)
- Alone at Last (1942)
- Without a Woman (1943)
- Eleven Men and a Ball (1948)
- The Ship of Condemned Women (1953)
- Day by Day, Desperately (1961)
