= Nothing New Tonight =

1942 film

- Film poster
- Directed by: Mario Mattoli
- Written by: Luciano Mattoli; Mario Mattoli; Aldo De Benedetti; Marcello Marchesi
- Produced by: Giorgio Adriani
- Starring: Alida Valli; Carlo Ninchi; Antonio Gandusio
- Cinematography: Aldo Tonti
- Edited by: Fernando Tropea
- Music by: Giovanni D'Anzi
- Production company: Consorzio Italfines
- Distributed by: Italcine
- Release date: 23 December 1942
- Running time: 88 minutes
- Country: Italy
- Language: Italian

Nothing New Tonight (Italian: Stasera niente di nuovo) is a 1942 Italian drama film directed by Mario Mattoli and starring Alida Valli, Carlo Ninchi and Antonio Gandusio. It was shot at the Safa Palatino Studios in Rome. The film's sets were designed by the art directors Piero Filippone and Mario Rappini.

== Plot ==
Cesare, a journalist, recognises among some prostitutes arrested by the police, the young woman that saved his life some time earlier, without his having learned her identity. He tries to help the woman, Maria, and convince her to change her life, but without success.

Later on, Maria asks Cesare for his help. She is dying in a hospital, but cannot tell her parents, because, some time earlier, she had told them that she was married. So, in the last hours of her life, Cesare marries Maria, and then calls for her family to be with her.

== Cast ==
- Alida Valli as Maria
- Carlo Ninchi as Cesare Manti
- Antonio Gandusio as Il dottore Moriesi
- Giuditta Rissone as Clelia, la padrona di casa
- Ninì Gordini Cervi as Matilde
- Armando Migliari as Il direttore del giornale
- Aldo Rubens as Giorgio, il ballerino
- Tina Lattanzi as La principale dell'istituto
- Cesarina Gheraldi as Un ospite dell'istituto
- Dina Galli as La portinaia
- Achille Majeroni as Il professore ladro
- Gilda Marchiò as La madre di Maria
- Vinicio Sofia as Il direttore del teatro
- Giovanni D'Anzi as Un amico di Moriesi al bar
- Tino Scotti as Il comico del varietà
- Anna Carena as La lavandaia
- Olga Capri as La sorvegliante
- Paolo Bonecchi as Il fattorino del giornale
- Anna Maestri as Un ospite dell'istituto
- Marisa Merlini as Un ospite dell'istituto

== Bibliography ==
- Reich, Jacqueline Beth. Fascism, Film, and Female Subjectivity: The Case of Italian Cinema 1936-1943. University of California, Berkeley, 1994.
