= We Were Seven Widows =

1939 film

- Directed by: Mario Mattoli
- Written by: Aldo De Benedetti; Steno
- Produced by: Giulio Manenti
- Starring: Antonio Gandusio
- Cinematography: Carlo Montuori
- Edited by: Fernando Tropea
- Release date: 4 October 1939
- Running time: 83 minutes
- Country: Italy
- Language: Italian

We Were Seven Widows (Eravamo sette vedove) is a 1939 Italian "white-telephones" comedy film directed by Mario Mattoli and starring Antonio Gandusio.

== Cast ==
- Antonio Gandusio – L'avvocato Ruggero Mauri
- Nino Taranto – Orlando, il cameriere di bordo
- Laura Nucci – Vera
- Silvana Jachino – Barbara
- Laura Solari – Anna Calcini
- Greta Gonda – Maria
- Anna Maria Dossena – Ada
- Maria Dominiani – Liliana
- Amelia Chellini – Gioconda Zappi Torriani
- Oscar Andriani – Il marito di Liliana
- Gino Bianchi – Francesco, il marito di Anna
- Adolfo Geri – Il marito di Ada
- Mario Siletti – Popi, il marito geloso di Vera
- Carlo Micheluzzi – Matteo
- Ori Monteverdi – L'infermiera
- Armando Migliari – Il medico
