= The Joker King =

1935 film by Enrico Guazzoni

- Directed by: Enrico Guazzoni
- Written by: Guglielmo Giannini; Guglielmo Rovetta
- Starring: Luisa Ferida; Armando Falconi; Luigi Cimara; María Denis
- Cinematography: Anchise Brizzi
- Edited by: Ferdinando Maria Poggioli
- Music by: Umberto Mancini
- Production company: Produzione Capitani Film
- Distributed by: ICAR
- Release date: 1935
- Running time: 94 minutes
- Country: Italy
- Language: Italian

The Joker King (Italian: Il re Burlone) is a 1935 Italian historical comedy film directed by Enrico Guazzoni and starring Luisa Ferida, Armando Falconi and Luigi Cimara.

It was shot at the Cines Studios in Rome.

== Plot ==
In Naples, in the time of king Ferdinand II, a girl organized a plot against the monarch to avenge her father who was executed for his political views. The plan, which also involves some officers, includes the kidnapping of the king, but the attempt fails. At the end, the king will set them free to escape to the Papal States.

== Cast ==
- Luisa Ferida as Trottola
- Armando Falconi as Ferdinand II
- Luigi Cimara as Count of Verolengo
- María Denis as Fanya
- Paolo Stoppa as Filuccio
- Gino Viotti as Count of Castelluccio
- Ellen Meis as Queen of Naples
- Evelina Paoli as Nennella's mother
- Luigi Pavese as Captain Alliana
- Bruno Persa as Taniello
- Emilio Petacci as Don Liborio
- Mario Pisu as Captain Rodriguez
- Diana Lante as Mirabella
- Pino Locchi as Franceschiello
- Achille Majeroni as Interior Minister
- Nicola Maldacea as the butler
- Tullio Galvani as the servant
- Carlo Duse as Captain Romoa
- Eugenio Duse as Capitain Holtmann
- Flavio Díaz as Savoldi
- Romolo Costa as Don Flaminio
- Vasco Creti as Baron of Battifarano
- Olinto Cristina as Prussian ambassador
- Luigi Erminio D'Olivo as Colonel Muller
- Miranda Bonansea as the King's youngest daughter

== Bibliography ==
- Moliterno, Gino. Historical Dictionary of Italian Cinema. Scarecrow Press, 2008.
