= Toto the Sheik =

1950 film

- Film poster
- Directed by: Mario Mattoli
- Written by: Agenore Incrocci; Marcello Marchesi; Vittorio Metz; Furio Scarpelli
- Produced by: Romolo Laurenti
- Starring: Totò
- Cinematography: Mario Albertelli
- Edited by: Giuliana Attenni
- Production company: Manenti Film
- Distributed by: Titanus Distribuzione
- Release date: 30 November 1950
- Running time: 95 minutes
- Country: Italy
- Language: Italian

Toto the Sheik (Italian: Totò sceicco) is a 1950 Italian comedy film directed by Mario Mattoli and starring Totò. It is a parody of desert films such as The Son of the Sheik and Siren of Atlantis.

== Plot ==
Antonio is the humble servant of a rich family, governed by the Marquis Gastone. Gastone is a young man madly in love with Lulu, but she betrays him, and he desperately enlist in the French Foreign Legion. The old Marchesa, his mother, persuades Antonio to enlist to watch over Gastone, and so he arrives in Arabia.

There Antonio is led with barrel (because enlistment is secret), and is exchanged by Arabs for their sheikh, who came to lead the revolt against the western invaders. The vicissitudes follow one another, especially when the rebels discover that Antonio is not the Sheikh, and so, having also escaped a death sentence, Antonio ends up in a secret passage, in the lost city of Atlantis, where he meets the beautiful Queen Antinea.

== Cast ==
- Totò as Antonio Sapore, il maggiordomo
- Tamara Lees as Antinea, la regina di Atlantide
- Laura Gore as Lulù
- Lauretta De Lauri as Fatma
- Ada Dondini as La marchesa
- Kiki Urbani as La danzatrice araba
- Aroldo Tieri as Il marchese Gastone
- Cesare Polacco as Mohamed
- Arnoldo Foà as Il matto
- Mario Castellani as Il colonnello dei ribelli
- Riccardo Billi as L'arabo della cella bianca
- Ubaldo Lay as Il maggiore della legione
- Carlo Duse as Un beduino
- Carlo Croccolo as Il cameriere
- Ughetto Bertucci as Ludovico, l'autista

== Bibliography ==
- Roberto Curti. Italian Gothic Horror Films, 1957-1969. McFarland, 2015.
