= The Two Misanthropists =

- Enrico Viarisio and María Denis
- Directed by: Amleto Palermi
- Written by: Ubaldo Magnaghi; Amleto Palermi; Francesco Pasinetti
- Starring: Camillo Pilotto; María Denis; Nino Besozzi
- Cinematography: Anchise Brizzi
- Edited by: Fernando Tropea
- Music by: Ettore Montanaro; Alessandro Cicognini
- Production company: Astra Film
- Distributed by: ENIC
- Release date: 30 June 1937
- Running time: 75 minutes
- Country: Italy
- Language: Italian

The Two Misanthropists (Italian: I due misantropi) is a 1937 Italian "white-telephones" historical comedy film directed by Amleto Palermi and starring Camillo Pilotto, María Denis and Nino Besozzi.

It was shot at the Cines Studios and Cinecittà in Rome. The film's sets were designed by the art director Giorgio Pinzauti.

== Cast ==
- Camillo Pilotto as Don Pedro di Alcazar, il tutore
- María Denis as Betty
- Nino Besozzi as Damiano Bertelet
- Enrico Viarisio as Marcello, parrucchiere
- Sergio Tofano as Cosimo Bertelet
- Nella Maria Bonora as Maria Grazia
- Marcello Giorda as Don Ramiro Mayoz
- Nicola Maldacea as Nicola, il domestico
- Ninì Gordini Cervi as Giuseppina
- Olga Vittoria Gentilli as Signora Argia
- Giulio Alfieri
- Ernesto Torrini

== Bibliography ==
- Roberto Chiti & Roberto Poppi. I film: Tutti i film italiani dal 1930 al 1944. Gremese Editore, 2005.
