= We Were Seven Sisters =

1939 film

- Directed by: Nunzio Malasomma
- Written by: Aldo De Benedetti
- Produced by: Luciano Doria
- Starring: Antonio Gandusio
- Cinematography: Arturo Gallea
- Edited by: Gabriele Varriale
- Release date: January 1939
- Running time: 97 minutes
- Country: Italy
- Language: Italian

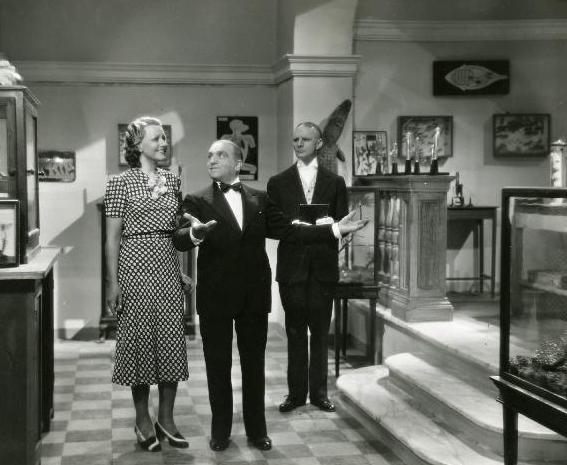
Scene from the film "We Were Seven Sisters" - Directed by Nunzio Malasomma, 1939 - Antonio Gandusio, center, looks at Paola Barbara and holds his arms up. Meanwhile, in the background, Sergio Tofano observes the scene.

We Were Seven Sisters (Italian: Eravamo sette sorelle) is a 1939 Italian "white-telephones" romantic comedy film directed by Nunzio Malasomma and starring Antonio Gandusio.

== Cast ==
- Antonio Gandusio as Il conte Leone Varani
- Nino Besozzi as Leonardo Varani
- Sergio Tofano as Antonio, il maggiordomo
- Pina Renzi as Amalia, la madre per finzione
- Paola Barbara as Lisa
- Ninì Gordini Cervi as Olga
- Lotte Menas as Eleonora
- Anna Maria Dossena as Marcella
- Olivia Fried as Norina
- Elena Altieri as Tina
- Guglielmo Sinaz as Fachinetti, il impresario
- Guglielmo Barnabò as Il barone Franzetti
