= Ninì Gordini Cervi =

Italian actress (1907–1988)

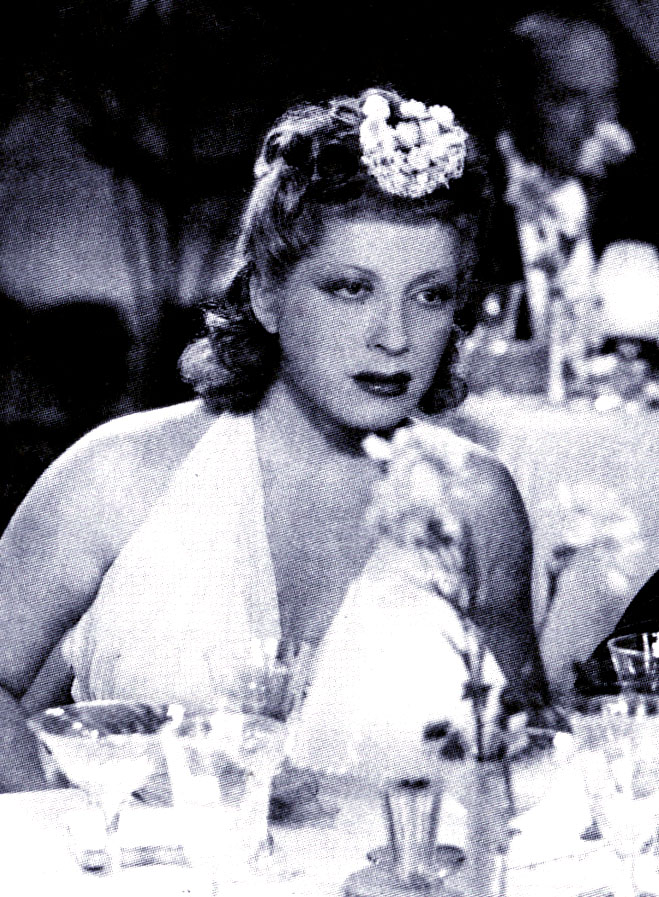
- Born: Angela Rosa Gordini; 15 August 1907; Lugo, Emilia-Romagna, Kingdom of Italy
- Died: 27 March 1988 (aged 80); Rome, Lazio, Italy
- Resting place: Cimitero Flaminio, Rome
- Occupation: Actress
- Years active: 1932–1943 (film)
- Spouse: Gino Cervi (m. 1928; died 1974)
- Children: Tonino Cervi
- Relatives: Valentina Cervi (granddaughter)

Angela Rosa "Ninì" Gordini Cervi (née Gordini; 15 August 1907 – 27 March 1988) was an Italian actress who worked in films, radio and on the stage. She was married to the actor Gino Cervi.

== Selected filmography ==
- Five to Nil (1932)
- The Two Misanthropists (1937)
- We Were Seven Sisters (1939)
- A Thousand Lire a Month (1939)
- The First Woman Who Passes (1940)
- Nothing New Tonight (1942)
- The White Angel (1943)

== Bibliography ==
- Goble, Alan. The Complete Index to Literary Sources in Film. Walter de Gruyter, 1999.
