= Ada Dondini =

Italian actress (1883–1958)

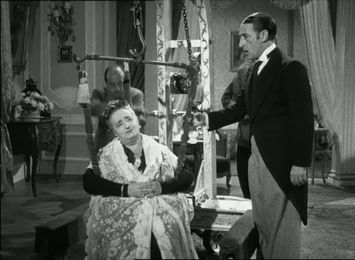
- Dondini, Ughetto Bertucci and Totò in Totò sceicco (1950)
- Born: 18 March 1883; Cosenza, Kingdom of Italy
- Died: 3 January 1958 (aged 74); Chieti, Italy
- Occupation: Actress
- Years active: 1916–1954

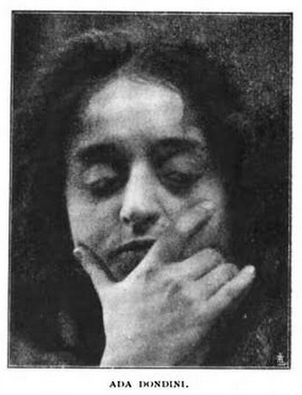
Ada Dondini, from a 1906 publication

Ada Dondini (18 March 1883 – 3 January 1958) was an Italian film actress. She appeared in 48 films between 1916 and 1954.

== Selected filmography ==
- The Charmer (1931)
- Just Married (1934)
- Mr. Desire (1934)
- I Love You Only (1935)
- Joe the Red (1936)
- Piccolo mondo antico (1941)
- Schoolgirl Diary (1941)
- The Secret Lover (1941)
- Invisible Chains (1942)
- Malombra (1942)
- Violets in Their Hair (1942)
- Luisa Sanfelice (1942)
- La valle del diavolo (1943)
- The Za-Bum Circus (1944)
- The Innocent Casimiro (1945)
- No Turning Back (1945)
- The Ten Commandments (1945)
- The Ways of Sin (1946)
- Un giorno nella vita (1946)
- The Two Orphans (1947)
- Fear and Sand (1948)
- Little Lady (1949)
- The Cadets of Gascony (1950)
- Women and Brigands (1950)
- Toto the Sheik (1950)
- Honeymoon Deferred (1951)
- Toto the Third Man (1951)
- Tragic Spell (1951)
- Sunday Heroes (1952)
- The Enemy (1952)
- Via Padova 46 (1953)
