= María Denis =

Italian actress (1916–2004)

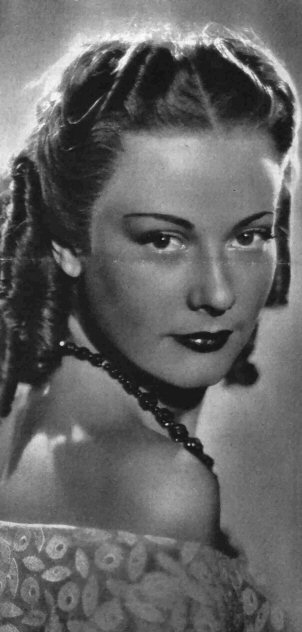
- Born: Maria Esther Belmonte; 22 November 1916; Buenos Aires, Argentina
- Died: 15 April 2004 (aged 87); Rome, Lazio, Italy
- Occupation: Actress
- Years active: 1932–1954
- Relatives: Michela Belmonte (sister)

María Denis (22 November 1916 – 15 April 2004, born Maria Esther Belmonte) was an Argentine-born actress in Italian made films. Denis moved to Italy when she was 16, in 1932, and appeared in her first film there the same year. She became a top Italian star between 1936 and 1942 playing girl-next-door characters. Denis later appeared in films in several other countries. In 1949, she appeared in the British film Private Angelo.

Her younger sister Michela Belmonte was also an actress.

Denis died in Rome on 15 April 2004, at the age of 87.

== Selected filmography ==
- What Scoundrels Men Are! (1932) - (uncredited)
- The Telephone Operator (1932) - (uncredited)
- Non c'è bisogno di denaro (1933) - Caterina
- 1860 (1933) - Clelia
- My Little One (1933) - La ragazza nel bar all'aperto
- Tourist Train (1933) - Maria
- L'impiegata di papà (1933) - Collega
- Villafranca (1934)
- Seconda B (1934) - Marta Renzi
- The Matchmaker (1934)
- Mr. Desire (1934)
- Creatures of the Night (1934) - L'altra ragazza
- La mia vita sei tu (1935) - La graziosa ragazza
- Together in the Dark (1935) - Manicure
- Lorenzino de' Medici (1935) - Nella
- The Joker King (1936) - Fanya
- God's Will Be Done (1936) - Anna
- Joe the Red (1936) - Marietta Clavel
- King of Diamonds (1936) - Lola
- The Countess of Parma (1937) - Adriana
- Lasciate ogni speranza (1937) - La figlia Gina
- The Two Misanthropists (1937) - Betty
- Naples of Olden Times (1938) - Ninetta
- Ballerine (1938)
- Departure (1938) - Anna Diana
- They've Kidnapped a Man (1938) - L'amichetta del attore
- Who Are You? (1939) - Francesca
- Pretty or Plain They All Get Married (1939) - Marcella
- The Document (1939) - La contessina Luisa Sabelli
- Two on a Vacation (1940) - Liliana Casali
- The Last Enemy (1940) - Anna Vitali
- The Two Mothers (1940) - Agatina
- Fortuna (1940) - La figlia del direttore del giornale
- The Siege of the Alcazar (1940) - Conchita Alvarez
- Abandonment (1940) - Maria, sua sorella
- Goodbye Youth (1940) - Dorina
- La compagnia della teppa (1941) - Ada Mellario
- L'amore canta (1941) - Vera
- Yes, Madam (1942) - Cristina Zunino
- I sette peccati (1942) - Isa Sturmer
- The Two Orphans (1942) - Luisa
- The Little Teacher (1942) - Maria Bini, la maestrina
- Canal grande (1943) - Lisa
- No Turning Back (1945) - Anna Bortone
- La Vie de Bohème (1945) - Mimi / Mimì
- Malìa (1946) - Nedda, sorella di Jana
- Crime News (1947)
- Nada (1947) - Ena Berenguer
- Four Women (1947) - Blanca / Elena / Lola / Marta
- The Dance of Death (1948) - Rita
- Private Angelo (1949) - Lucrezia
- The Flame That Will Not Die (1949) - Maria
- A Slice of Life (1954) - La signora (segment "Scusi ma...") (final film role)
