= La trovatella di Pompei =

1957 Italian melodrama film

- Directed by: Giacomo Gentilomo
- Written by: Giorgio Costantini; Antonio Ferrigno; Giacomo Gentilomo; Alfredo Polacci
- Starring: Massimo Girotti; Alessandra Panaro
- Cinematography: Carlo Nebiolo
- Music by: Franco Langella
- Release date: 1957
- Language: Italian

La trovatella di Pompei (lit. The Foundling of Pompei) is a 1957 Italian melodrama film co-written and directed by Giacomo Gentilomo and starring Massimo Girotti and Alessandra Panaro.

== Plot ==
Pompeii. Maria, is a girl raised by the loving care of a poor couple but without knowing anything about her real parents. She is in love with Giorgio, a boy from a good family, who however has also aroused the interest of the intriguing Edvige who frequents bad company including jealous Roberto. Edvige wants to meet Giorgio with the intention of telling him that Maria is a foundling therefore not worthy to be by his side but later has a clash with Roberto who hits her and kills her. There would be a witness but Roberto, threatening him with death, succeeds in obtaining his silence, the blame therefore falls on Maria, who arrived shortly after the crime attracted by the noises with the intention of bringing help. During the trial Guglielmo, the public prosecutor, lashes out with fury against the girl, a clear example that evil (a father who has abandoned her can only be a criminal) can only give birth to other evil. Fortunately, an old servant of the magistrate remembers what happened years before, Maria is the natural daughter of Guglielmo, forced by the family to leave the birth in an orphanage in Pompeii. Shocked by the news, the magistrate begins to use calmer and less violent tones but the witness arrives at the very end to clarify the truth about the crime and Maria can finally marry her beloved Giorgio.

== Cast ==
- Massimo Girotti as Guglielmo
- Alessandra Panaro as Maria Molinaro
- Carlo Giustini as Roberto
- Antonio De Teffé as Giorgio
- Tina Lattanzi as Baroness Curti
- Tecla Scarano as Donna Nunziata
- Philippe Hersent as Mariano
- Michele Abruzzo as Molinaro
- Ilse Peterson as Edvige
- Wandisa Guida as Lucia
- Giorgio Costantini as The Commissioner
- Armando Romeo as Musician
- Marco Tulli as Musician
- Franca Dominici
- Franca Bettoja
