= Pina Renzi =

Italian actress (1901–1984)

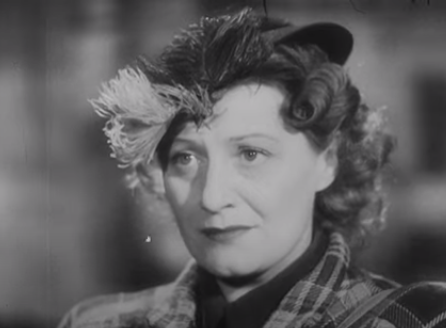
- Renzi in 1941
- Born: 16 December 1901; Morciano di Romagna, Italy
- Died: 13 July 1984 (aged 82); Riccione, Italy
- Occupation: Actress
- Years active: 1933–1959

Pina Renzi (16 December 1901 – 13 July 1984) was an Italian film actress. She appeared in more than 50 films between 1933 and 1959. She also directed one film, Cercasi bionda bella presenza, in 1942. She was born in Morciano di Romagna, Italy and died in Riccione, Italy.

== Selected filmography ==
- The Girl with the Bruise (1933)
- Everybody's Secretary (1933)
- I'll Always Love You (1933)
- God's Will Be Done (1936)
- The Amnesiac (1936)
- The Ferocious Saladin (1937)
- For Men Only (1938)
- We Were Seven Sisters (1939)
- It Always Ends That Way (1939)
- Two Million for a Smile (1939)
- At Your Orders, Madame (1939)
- The Sin of Rogelia Sanchez (1940)
- Maddalena, Zero for Conduct (1940)
- A Husband for the Month of April (1941)
- Thrill (1941)
- Fourth Page (1942)
- A Living Statue (1943)
- The Son of the Red Corsair (1943)
- Accidents to the Taxes!! (1951)
- The Two Sergeants (1951)
- Matrimonial Agency (1953)
- The Enchanting Enemy (1953)
- The Three Thieves (1954)
