= The Sicilian Checkmate =

- Directed by: Florestano Vancini
- Produced by: Dino De Laurentiis
- Starring: Enrico Maria Salerno
- Cinematography: Antonio Secchi
- Music by: Ennio Morricone
- Release date: 1972
- Country: Italy
- Language: Italian

The Sicilian Checkmate (Italian: La violenza: quinto potere) is a 1972 Italian crime-drama film directed by Florestano Vancini.

== Plot ==
The construction of a dam in Sicily triggers unspeakable interests and appetites that find immediate repercussions in a feud between two mafia gangs who support two different power groups, one headed by the manufacturer Barresi, who aspires to secure the contract for the works, the other to the engineer Crupi, a wealthy landowner, who would lose his citrus groves following the completion of the project. After a long series of crimes of which not only some members of the rival gangs are the victims, but also many innocent ones, we arrive at the trial that sees the accused representatives of major and minor prominent members of the two mafia organizations. Of the only two defendants determined to confess, one commits suicide in prison, the other is passed off as insane. Thus, only two minor figures pay for all the others, who instead are acquitted.

== Cast ==
- Enrico Maria Salerno: Prosecutor
- Gastone Moschin: Colonnesi, defense attorney
- Riccardo Cucciolla: professor Salemi
- Mario Adorf: Amedeo Barrese
- Turi Ferro: Judge Nicola Altofascio
- Mariangela Melato: Rosaria Licato
- Julien Guiomar: Commissioner Golino
- Georges Wilson: Crupi
- Ciccio Ingrassia: Ferdinando Giacalone
- Aldo Giuffrè: Giuseppe Salemi
- Ferruccio De Ceresa: Senator
- Michele Abruzzo: Zaccaria
- Jeannie Elias: Secretary of Walter
- Elio Zamuto: Verzi
- Guido Celano

== See also ==
- List of Italian films of 1972
