= Fulvia Mammi =

Italian actress and voice actress

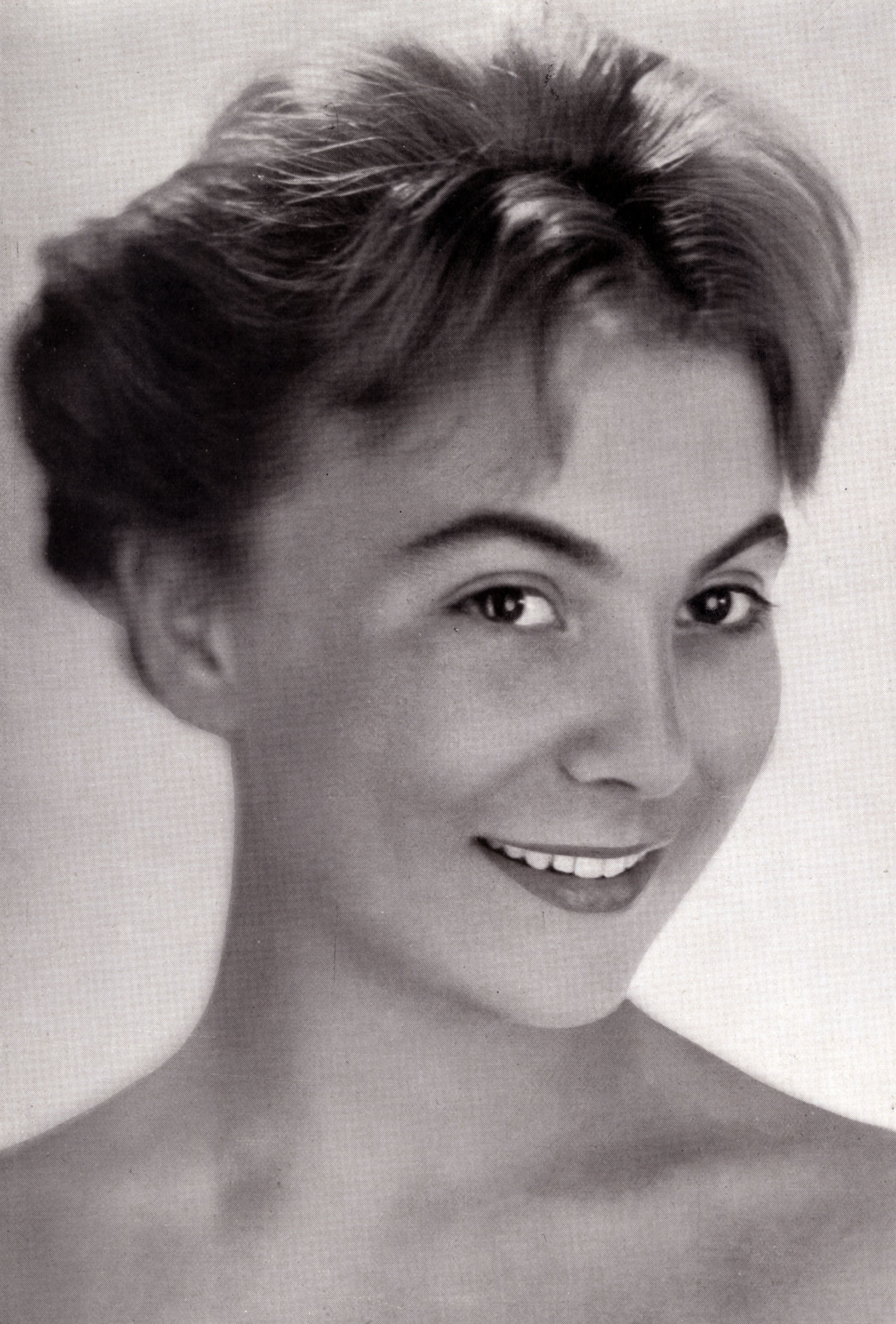
- Mammi in 1953
- Born: 25 May 1927; Rome, Kingdom of Italy
- Died: 4 June 2006 (aged 79); Bologna, Italy
- Education: Silvio D'Amico National Academy of Dramatic Art
- Occupations: Actress; voice actress
- Years active: 1949–1960

Fulvia Mammi (25 May 1927 – 4 June 2006) was an Italian actress and voice actress.

== Life and career ==
Born in Rome, Mammi attended the Silvio D'Amico National Academy of Dramatic Art and made her theatrical debut in Peccato che sia una sgualdrina. Mainly active on stage, she worked with Giorgio Strehler, André Barsacq, Giuseppe Patroni Griffi among others. Between late 1940s and early 1960s she was also active in films, usually playing roles of sensible and fragile women. She was also active as a voice actress and a dubber. She died on 4 June 2006, at the Retirement Home for Artists in Bologna.

== Selected filmography ==
- The Flame That Will Not Die (1949)
- The Cadets of Gascony (1950)
- Red Seal (1950)
- Against the Law (1950)
- Toto the Third Man (1951)
- The Queen of Sheba (1952)
- Red and Black (1955)
- Il bell'Antonio (1960)
