= Gino Rocca =

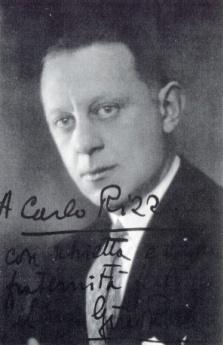
Gino Rocca (1941)

Gino Rocca (Mantua, 22 February 1891 – Milan, 13 February 1941) was an Italian writer, playwright, journalist and theatre critic.

Author of over ninety comedies, partly in Venetian language, brought to the theatre by numerous companies and represented up to the present day. Among the last productions, the one of 1983 with Tonino Micheluzzi and Mario Valdemarin who brought on stage the three one-act plays L'imbriago de sesto, La scorzeta de limon, L'amigo american directed by Toni Andreetta.

== Biography ==
Born in Mantua from a father from Turin and a mother from Feltre, he spent the first years of his youth between Piedmont and Veneto and attended for some years the Faculty of Law at the University of Padua and Turin.

In 1913, having abandoned his studies, he moved to Milan where, having met Benito Mussolini, he became and remained for over twenty years a theatre critic for the newspaper Il Popolo d'Italia.

The advent of the First World War had considerable influence on the young writer as demonstrated in the novel Uragano of 1919, in the 1920 drama in three acts Le Liane and La farsa dei nevrastenici. In 1919 he was among the founders of the literary magazine Novella.

In 1931 he received the Bagutta Prize for the novel Gli ultimi furono i primi.

In 1934 he was appointed director of the first Theatre Festival of the Venice Biennale and for the first and only time he directed Goldoni's comedy La bottega del caffè. It was also the first time that a Goldonian work was performed outdoors: "Che amore di campiello la corte del Teatro di San Luca!"

He moved to Venice where between 1937 and 1938 he directed Il Gazzettino.

It returned then to Milan, where on the weekly Il Milione, of the Mondadori, published fourteen unique acts inspired to facts of chronicle.

He continued to collaborate with various literary and theatrical magazines until his physical condition worsened as a result of a war wound that caused the amputation of his leg.

He died in Milan in 1941, and was buried in Fonzaso, in the province of Belluno.

His son Guido, after a long activity as a journalist, followed in his footsteps in the theatre but died in 1961 of a serious illness.

== Works ==
In Italian:

- L'altro amore, 1910
- Trame, 1919
- Gigomard
- Tramonto romantico
- Vecchie storie
- Il martirio di San Gregorio
- Il primo amore, 1920
- Tragedia senza l'eroe, 1924
- L'inganno
- Purificazione
- L'ora onesta
- Dopo di noi
- L'amante di suo marito
- La calzetta rotta
- La pelle
- L'intesa
- La gelosia
- Cessate il foc!
- Le lettere dell'altro
- Le liane, 1920
- Le corna del dilemma
- Noi, 1921
- La farsa dei nevrastenici
- Il vincolo del dolore
- Colpi di spillo
- L'uccisione di un generale in Cina, 1923
- Gli amanti impossibili, 1925
- Nido rifatto, 1927
- Il gladiatore morente, 1928
- Il terzo amante, 1929
- Volo a vela, 1939
- Le carte son sincere
- Il re povero, 1939

In Venetian:

- Se no i xe mati, no li volemo, 1926
- Sior Tita paron, 1928
- Su de noi, 1926
- La vecia insempiada
- L'imbriago de sesto
- Checo
- Mustaci de fero, 1932
- Gli ultimi del Krak
- El sol sui veri, 1911

== Bibliography ==
- Gino Rocca, "Il Dramma", n. 349, 1 marzo 1941, p. 28
- Fernando Ghilardi, Gino Rocca. Il canto iridente e pietoso, "Il Dramma", n. 345–346, giugno-luglio 1965, pp. 91–100
