= Guido Rocca =

Italian writer

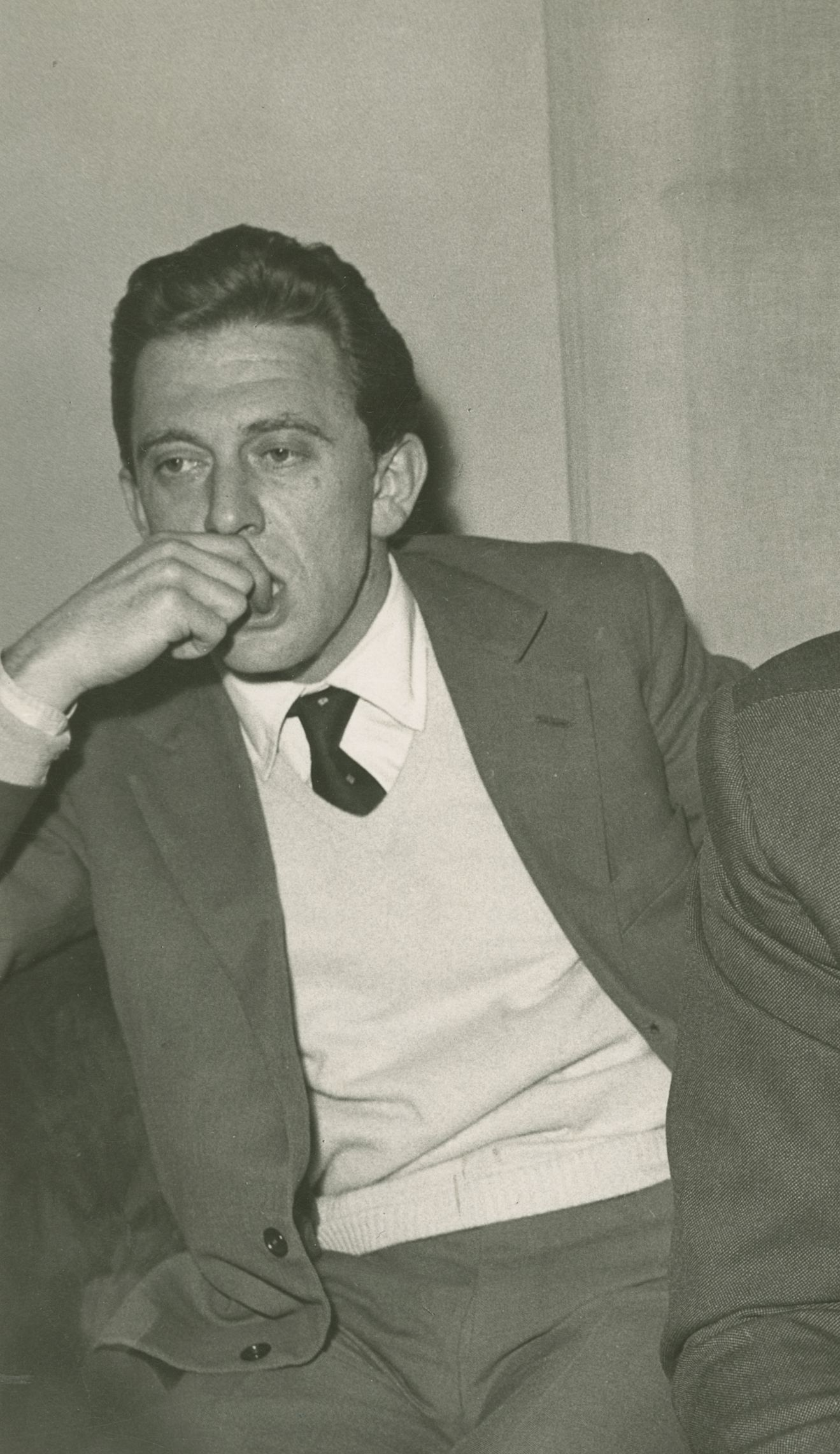
- Guido Rocca in at a press conference in 1959
- Born: 26 January 1928; Milan
- Died: 15 May 1961 (aged 33)
- Occupation: Writer

Guido Rocca (26 January 1928, in Milan – 15 May 1961) was an Italian writer.

== Works ==
=== Novels ===
- L'importanza di avere un cavallo (racconto), 1950 (poi Milano, Mursia, 1962). (1º premio ex aequo "Olimpiadi della Cultura", Genova)
- Si spensero i fuochi, Genova, Seit, 1951. (romanzo)
- La ragazza imprudente, Milano, Corticelli, 1956.
- Romanzi, racconti, teatro (Storie di Andi, Altre storie per Andi, Si spensero i fuochi, La ragazza imprudente, Notte e giorno), a cura di Renato Prinzhofer, Mursia, Milano, 1962.

=== Plays ===
- La marcia su Roma (1960).
- Il club delle belle speranze (1946), Milano, Mursia, 1962.
- I coccodrilli (1956), in Sipario, n.129, gennaio 1957. E.I.S.T. VII/IX-1958; Mursia, Milano, 1962.
- La conquista di Roma (1957), ib., 1962.
- Una montagna di carta (1958), in Sipario, giugno 1958; poi Mursia, Milano, 1962.
- Il solito esagono ovvero Legati così (1959), Mursia, Milano, 1962.
- Un blues per Silvia (riproposto anche col nuovo titolo di « Nient'altro che nostalgia ») (1959), ib., 1962.
- Mare e whisky (1959), in Sipario, novembre 1959; Mursia, Milano, 1962.
- La rivolta dei giovani (1960), Mursia, Milano, 1962.
- Il fagiano Gaetano, favola di caccia (1961), disegni di Giulio Cingoli e Giancarlo Carloni, Milano, Mursia, 1961 (poi 1962; e, nuova ed., illustrazioni di Mario Pandiani, Milano, Emme, 1983). (favola per bambini)
