= Tatyana Pavlova =

Russian theatre director

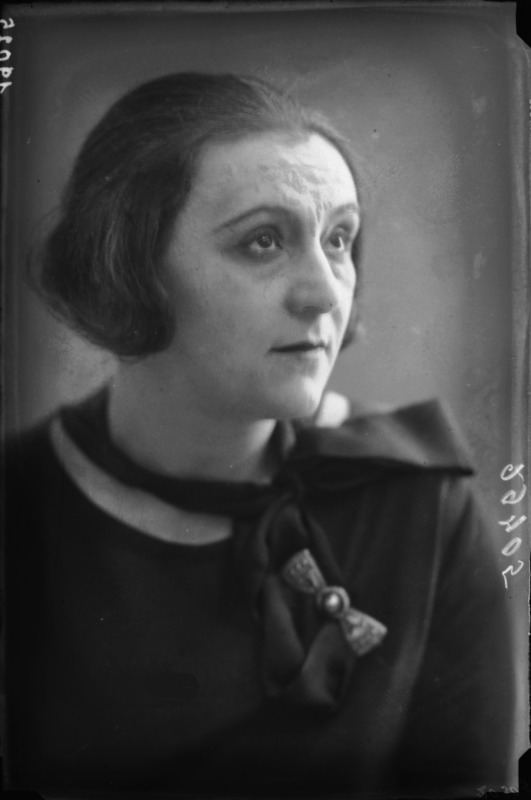
- Born: 10 December 1890; Yekaterinoslav, Russian Empire
- Died: 7 November 1975 (aged 84); Grottaferrata, Lazio, Italy
- Occupations: Actress, Director
- Years active: 1920-1965 (film)

Tatyana Pavlova (10 December 1890 – 7 November 1975) was a Russian-born theatre director and stage and film actress who settled in Italy. Her name is sometimes written as Tatania Pavlova.

== Selected filmography ==
- Everybody's Woman (1934)
- Creatures of the Night (1934)
- Black Magic (1949)
- The Dreamer (1965)

== Bibliography ==
- Cardullo, Bert. Vittorio De Sica: Actor, Director, Auteur. Cambridge Scholars Publishing, 2009.
