= Angelo Musco =

Italian actor

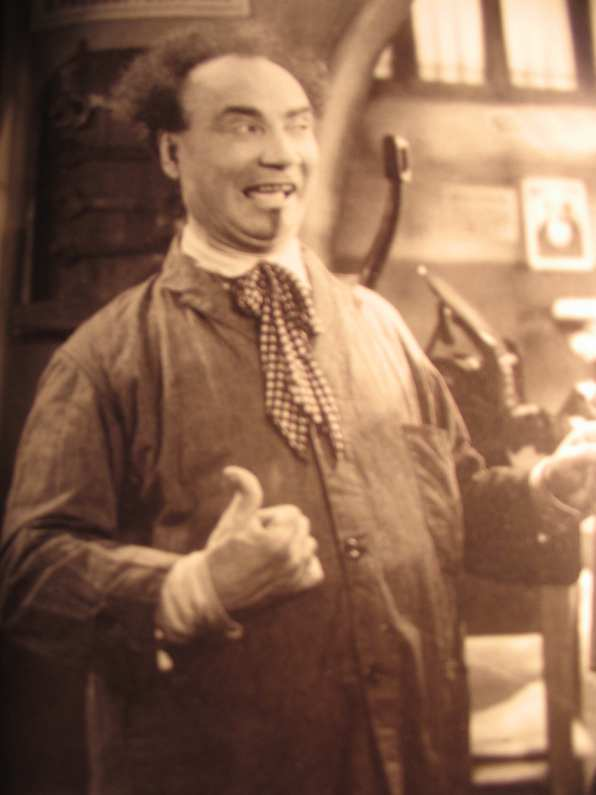
- Musco in Fiat voluntas Dei (1936)
- Born: 18 December 1872; Catania, Sicily
- Died: 6 October 1937 (aged 64); Milan

Angelo Musco (18 December 1872 – 6 October 1937) was an Italian actor in theater and film. He was known for his comic abilities as well as for his carefully drawn psychological portraits.

== Life and career ==
Born in Catania, Sicily to a Maltese father and a Sicilian mother, Musco worked at a number of menial, odd jobs in his youth, spending time as a barber, a shoemaker, and a mason. He broke into theatrical work by finding employment with the Opera dei Pupi, the local marionette theater. In 1899 he joined the theatrical company of Giovanni Grasso, whose actors performed only in the Sicilian language.

In 1902 Musco began a collaboration with Nino Martoglio, who had seen him in Rome in Malia of Luigi Capuana and I Mafiusi of Giuseppe Rizzotto and Gaetano Mosca. Martoglio became director of Musco's company in 1907, and wrote for him the plays San Giovanni decollatu and L'aria del continente. Musco also collaborated with Pier Maria Rosso di San Secondo, author of the play Madre, and he worked with Marinella Bragaglia and Rosina Anselmi. He also founded his own theater company, supported by the critic Renato Simoni and by Luigi Pirandello. The latter wrote a number of comedies for him to play, including Il berretto a sonagli (which he played in Rome), Liolà, and Pensaci, Giacomino!. This last was filmed with Musco in the lead role; his cinematic career had begun in 1932 and was a great success.

Musco died suddenly in Milan in 1936, immediately after a performance. He was the subject of a documentary directed by Giorgio Walter Chili in 1953, C'era una volta Angelo Musco.

== Filmography ==
- Five to Nil (1932)
- The Matchmaker (1934)
- L'eredita dello zio buonanima (1934)
- God's Will Be Done (1936)
- The Amnesiac (1936)
- King of Diamonds (1936)
- L'aria del continente (1936)
- Pensaci, Giacomino! (1937)
- Gatta ci cova (1937)
- The Ferocious Saladin (1937)

== Bibliography ==
- S. Zappulla Muscarà, E. Zappulla, Musco: immagini di un attore Catania, Giuseppe Maimone editore, 1987, ISBN 8877510137.
- E. Zappulla Angelo Musco e il teatro del suo tempo Catania, Giuseppe Maimone editore, 1991, ISBN 8877510471.
