= Orazio Costa =

Italian theatre director (1911–1999)

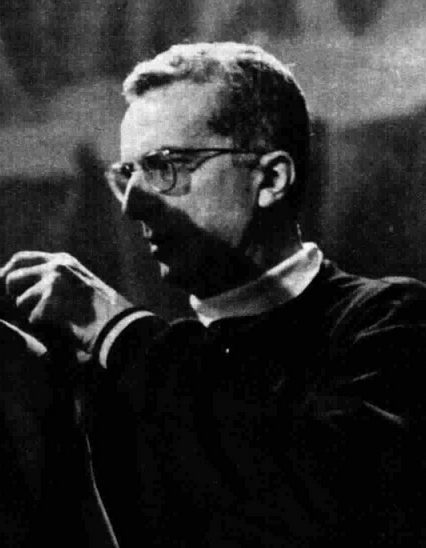
- Costa in 1967
- Born: 6 August 1911; Rome, Italy
- Died: 14 November 1999 (aged 88); Florence, Italy
- Occupations: theatre pedagogist and director

Orazio Costa (6 August 1911 – 14 November 1999) was an Italian theatre pedagogist and director.

Born Orazio Costa Giovangigli in Rome, Costa graduated from the Silvio d’Amico Academy of Dramatic Arts in 1937, and after being assistant director of Jacques Copeau, in 1945 he started a long career as theatre director. He directed over 170 stage works. He founded and directed from 1948 to 1954 the Piccolo Teatro of the City of Rome.

Devoted to pedagogy, Costa was an acting teacher of the Silvio d’Amico Academy from 1944 to 1976. He then moved to Florence, where he collaborated with the Teatro della Pergola and further developed his educational system, founding the "Centro di avviamento all' espressione funzionante" (Italian for "education centre to functional expression"), active from 1979 to 1992. In 1996, Costa was honoured with the title of Knight Grand Cross of the Order of Merit of the Italian Republic.
