= List of Italian films of 1938 =

A list of films produced in Italy under Fascist rule in 1938 (see 1938 in film):

Title	Director	Cast	Genre	Notes
1938
13 Men and a Gun	Mario Zampi	Arthur Wontner, Clifford Evans	War	British/Italian co-production
L' Albergo degli assenti		Maurizio D'Ancora, Enzo Gainotti		
All of Life in One Night	Corrado D'Errico	Luisa Ferida, Camillo Pilotto, Germana Paolieri	Drama	
L' Allegro cantante	Gennaro Righelli			
Amicizia	Oreste Biancoli	Elsa Merlini, Nino Besozzi		
Battles in the Shadow	Domenico Gambino	Antonio Centa, Dria Paola, Paola Barbara	Thriller	
The Count of Brechard	Mario Bonnard	Amedeo Nazzari, Luisa Ferida, Ugo Ceseri	Historical	
The Cuckoo Clock	Camillo Mastrocinque	Vittorio De Sica, Oretta Fiume, Laura Solari	Mystery	
Departure	Amleto Palermi	Vittorio De Sica, María Denis	Comedy	
Ettore Fieramosca	Alessandro Blasetti	Gino Cervi, Mario Ferrari, Elisa Cegani	Historical	
For Men Only	Guido Brignone	Antonio Gandusio, Paola Barbara	Comedy	
Giuseppe Verdi	Carmine Gallone	Fosco Giachetti, Germana Paolieri	Biopic	
The House of Shame	Max Neufeld	Amedeo Nazzari, Assia Noris, Alida Valli	Comedy	
I Want to Live with Letizia	Camillo Mastrocinque	Assia Noris, Gino Cervi, Umberto Melnati	Comedy	
A Lady Did It	Mario Mattoli	Michele Abruzzo, Alida Valli	Comedy	
The Lady in White	Mario Mattoli	Elsa Merlini, Nino Besozzi, Enrico Viarisio	Comedy	
The Last Enemy	Umberto Barbaro	Fosco Giachetti, María Denis	Drama	
Luciano Serra, Pilot	Goffredo Alessandrini	Amedeo Nazzari, Germana Paolieri	Drama	
Naples of Olden Times	Amleto Palermi	Vittorio De Sica, Emma Gramatica	Comedy	
Nonna Felicità	Mario Mattoli	Dina Galli, Armando Falconi	Comedy	
Pietro Micca	Aldo Vergano	Guido Celano, Renato Cialente	Historical	
Pride	Marco Elter	Fosco Giachetti, Paola Barbara, Mario Ferrari	Drama	
Princess Tarakanova	Fyodor Otsep, Mario Soldati	Annie Vernay, Pierre Richard-Willm	Historical	Co-production with France
Star of the Sea	Corrado D'Errico	Galliano Masini, Luisa Ferida, Germana Paolieri	Comedy	
They've Kidnapped a Man	Gennaro Righelli	Vittorio De Sica, Caterina Boratto, Maria Denis	Comedy	
Tonight at Eleven	Oreste Biancoli	John Lodge, Francesca Braggiotti	Mystery	
Triumph of Love	Mario Mattoli	Paola Barbara, Vittorio De Sica	Comedy	
The Two Mothers	Amleto Palermi	Vittorio De Sica, María Denis	Drama	
Under the Southern Cross	Guido Brignone	Antonio Centa, Doris Duranti	Drama	
The Woman of Monte Carlo	André Berthomieu, Mario Soldati	Dita Parlo, Fosco Giachetti	Drama	

== See also ==
- List of Italian films of 1937
- List of Italian films of 1939
