= Achille Majeroni =

Achille Majeroni may refer to:

- Achille Majeroni (actor, born 1824) (1824–1888), Italian stage actor
- Achille Majeroni (actor, born 1881) (1881–1964), Italian film actor, son of above
