= Majeroni =

Majeroni (pronounced mah-rony) is an Italian surname shared by:

- Achille Majeroni (theatre) (1824–1888), Italian actor, brother of Eduardo

- Achille Majeroni (1881–1964), Italian film actor, son of Achille

- Eduardo Majeroni (1840–1891), Italian actor in Australia, brother of Achille

- Mario Majeroni (1870-1931), Italian actor in Australia and America, son of Eduardo
- George Majeroni (1877–1924), Australian actor in America, son of Eduardo
