= Diamonds (1939 film) =

1939 film

- Directed by: Corrado D'Errico
- Written by: Ettore Maria Margadonna; Camillo Mariani Dell'Aguillara; Guglielmo Usellini
- Based on: A Bocca Nuda by Salvatore Gotta
- Produced by: Eugenio Fontana
- Starring: Doris Duranti; Lamberto Picasso; Laura Nucci
- Cinematography: Aldo Tonti
- Edited by: Ferdinando Maria Poggioli
- Music by: Costantino Ferri
- Production company: Alfa Film
- Distributed by: Consorzio Italiano Noleggiatori Filmi
- Release date: 10 March 1939
- Running time: 70 minutes
- Country: Italy
- Language: Italian

Diamonds (Italian: Diamanti) is a 1939 Italian "white-telephones" comedy film directed by Corrado D'Errico and starring Doris Duranti, Lamberto Picasso and Laura Nucci.

It was made at Cinecittà Studios in Rome. Salvo D'Angelo designed the film sets.

== Cast ==
- Doris Duranti as Marta Aurasco
- Lamberto Picasso as Il marajah principe Mohammed
- Laura Nucci as Anna
- Enrico Glori as Carlo Deremont
- Guglielmo Sinaz as Riccardo Krauss
- Gemma Bolognesi as Jeanne Deremont
- Romolo Costa as Il barone Kapperdorf
- Alberto Manfredini as Morino, il direttore della tipografia
- Fausto Guerzoni as Sguerza, il capo tipografo
- Olinto Cristina
- Carlo Mariotti
- Ori Monteverdi
- Giuseppe Ricagno
- Lia Rosa
- Ernesto Torrini

== Bibliography ==
- Enrico Lancia. Dizionario del cinema italiano: Dal 1930 al 1944. Gremese Editore, 2005.
