= The Courier of Moncenisio =

The Courier of Moncenisio (Italian:Il vetturale del Moncenisio) may refer to:

- The Courier of Moncenisio (1916 film), an Italian silent film
- The Courier of Moncenisio (1927 film), an Italian silent film
- The Courier of Moncenisio (1956 film), an Italian film
