= Elena Altieri =

Italian actress (1916–1997)

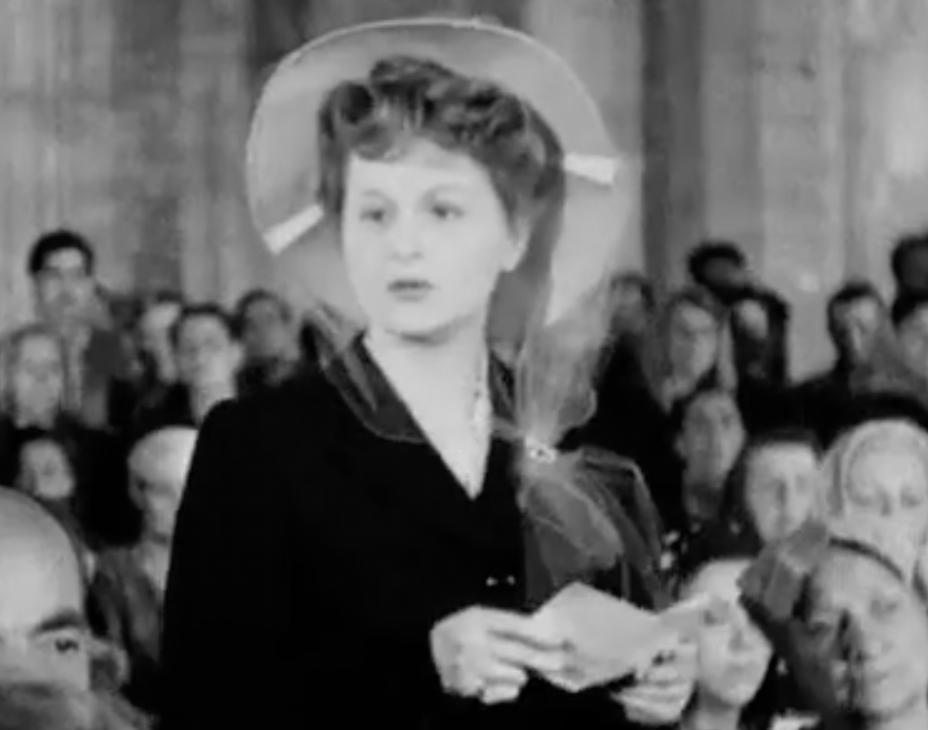
- Altieri in the movie Bicycle Thieves (1948)
- Born: 27 July 1916; Stresa, Kingdom of Italy
- Died: 1 May 1997 (aged 80); Nice, France
- Occupation: Actress
- Years active: 1937–1955

Elena Altieri (born Elena Capucci; 27 July 1916 – 1 May 1997) was an Italian film and stage actress. She appeared in 27 films between 1937 and 1955. She was born in Stresa, the daughter of an Italian father and an English mother. She was mainly cast, both on stage and in films, in roles of haughty and aristocratic women.

Queen of the Scala was the debut film for both Altieri and the actress Laura Solari.

== Partial filmography ==
- Queen of the Scala (1937)
- Luciano Serra, Pilot (1938) - (uncredited)
- We Were Seven Sisters (1939) - Tina
- At Your Orders, Madame (1939) - Ginette
- Piccolo hotel (1939)
- In the Country Fell a Star (1939) - La cognata di Margaret
- L'amore si fa così (1939) - Una indossatrice
- Vento di milioni (1940)
- Big Shoes (1940) - Marta
- Idyll in Budapest (1941)
- Il pozzo dei miracoli (1941) - Anna
- Vertigine (1942) - Marcella
- Black Gold (1942) - La collega di Marta
- Guardia del corpo (1942)
- Colpi di timone (1942) - Jole Precordi, sua moglie
- Fourth Page (1942) - Sua moglie
- The White Angel (1943) - Clara, moglie di Arnaldo
- La maschera e il volto (1943)
- Bicycle Thieves (1948) - The Charitable Lady
- Totò Le Mokò (1949) - Nancy
- His Last Twelve Hours (1950) - La contessa
- Romanzo d'amore (1950) - amie de Luisa
- Free Escape (1951)
- Altri tempi (1952) - Moglie del maggiore (segment "Pot-pourri di canzoni") (uncredited)
- The Golden Coach (1952) - Duchesse de Castro
- L'ultimo amante (1955) - La direttrice del giornale
- Scapricciatiello (1955) - The Baroness Matilde - Renato's mother
- Difendo il mio amore (1956)
