= Diana Torrieri =

Italian actress (1913–2007)

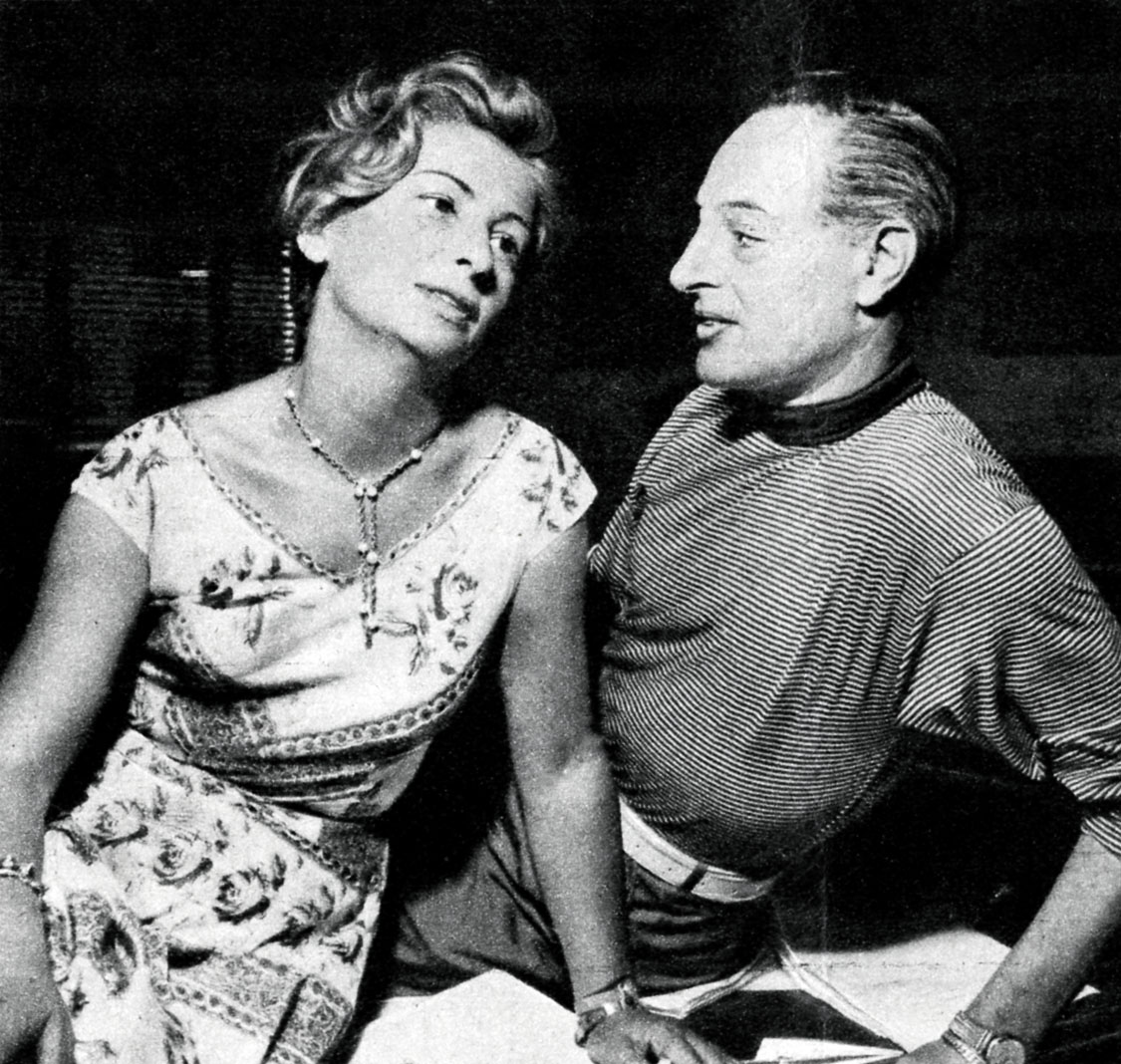
- Diana Torrieri with the actor Tino Bianchi (1956)
- Born: Angela Vittoria Torrieri; 9 August 1913; Canosa di Puglia, Puglia, Italy
- Died: 27 March 2007 (aged 93); Rome, Lazio, Italy
- Occupation: Actress
- Years active: 1939-1980

Diana Torrieri (née Angela Vittoria Torrieri; 9 August 1913 – 27 March 2007) was an Italian actress. She worked in theater, films, television and radio.

== Life and career ==
Born in Canosa di Puglia, Torrieri made her professional debut in 1937, in the stage company led by Paola Borboni, with whom she even toured in the United States. During the war, she was a partisan and a member of the Action Party and was even wounded during the liberation of Milan. In 1949, she tried to commit suicide by swallowing sleeping pills.

Active on stage until the late 1960s, she worked with the theatrical companies of Giorgio Strehler, Vittorio Gassman, Anton Giulio Bragaglia, Giorgio Albertazzi, Sergio Tofano and Memo Benassi, among others.

== Selected filmography ==
- Il barone di Corbò (1939)
- Don Pasquale (1940)
- La primadonna (1943)
- Incontro con Laura (1945)
- Oedipus Rex by Sophocles, with Vittorio Gassmann (1955).
- Via Belgarbo (1957) (TV movie)
- Fedra (1957) (TV movie)
- La promessa (1979) (TV movie)
