= The Dream of Butterfly =

1939 film directed by Carmine Gallone

- Directed by: Carmine Gallone
- Written by: Guido Cantini; Ernst Marischka
- Produced by: Fritz Curioni
- Starring: Maria Cebotari; Fosco Giachetti; Germana Paolieri
- Cinematography: Anchise Brizzi; Alberto Fusi
- Edited by: Oswald Hafenrichter
- Music by: Luigi Ricci
- Production company: Grandi Film Storici
- Distributed by: Industrie Cinematografiche Italiane
- Release date: 12 September 1939
- Running time: 100 minutes
- Countries: Germany; Italy
- Language: Italian

The Dream of Butterfly (Italian: Il sogno di Butterfly, German: Premiere der Butterfly) is a 1939 musical drama film directed by Carmine Gallone and starring Maria Cebotari, Fosco Giachetti and Germana Paolieri. It is a variation of the plot of the opera Madame Butterfly. A co-production between Italy and Germany, two separate versions were produced in the respective languages. It is also alternatively titled Madame Butterfly. It was one of several opera-related films directed by Gallone, following on from Casta Diva (1935) and Giuseppe Verdi (1938).

It was shot at the Cinecittà Studios in Rome. The film's sets were designed by the art directors Ivo Battelli and Guido Fiorini. It was shown at the 1939 Venice Film Festival.

== Synopsis ==
In nineteenth-century Italy, promising singer Rosi Belloni meets American music student Harry Peters and the two become engaged and she falls pregnant by him. Before she can tell him this news, he informs her he is returning to the United States for three years for further musical education. Unwilling to stand in the way of his future, she does not tell him about her pregnancy. Although he promises to be in contact within a year, she receives no word from him.

Five years later Peters, now a conductor at the Metropolitan Opera in New York City, returns to Italy with his new American wife. In the meantime Rosi Belloni has risen to become a leading opera singer, and is chosen by Puccini to sing the title role in his new opera Madame Butterfly at La Scala. Encountering the five-year-old son who has been raised to honour the idea of his father, Peters comes to realise what he missed by not marrying Belloni. In turn she comes to appreciate how much her own life resembles that of Madame Butterfly.

== Cast ==
=== Italian version ===
- Maria Cebotari as Rosi Belloni/Madame Butterfly
- Fosco Giachetti as Harry Peters
- Lucie Englisch as Anna Ranieri
- Germana Paolieri as Mary Peterson
- Luigi Almirante as Riccardo Belli
- Angelo Ferrari as Ispiziente
- Renato Cialente
- Guglielmo Barnabò
- Carlo Lombardi
- Miranda Bonansea
- Giuseppe Pierozzi
- Paolo Stoppa
- Rio Nobile
- Gino Viotti
- Elena Ambrosetti
- Carlo Bonansea
- Liana Del Balzo
- Gabriella Duda
- Mary Dumont
- Achille Majeroni
- Guido Notari
- Giovanni Stupin
- Saro Urzì

=== German version ===
- Maria Cebotari as Sängerin Rosi Belloni
- Fosco Giachetti as Kapellmeister Harry Peterson
- Lucie Englisch as Anni Eigner, Rosis Freundin
- Paul Kemp as Richard Hell, Maler und Annis Bräutigam
- Joachim Pfaff as Harry, Rosis Sohn
- Luise Stranzinger as Mary Peterson, Harrys Frau
- Siegfried Schürenberg as Paul Fieri, Richards Freund
- Alfred Neugebauer as Camillo Chiosone, Puccinis Beauftragter
- Heinrich Fuchs as Luigi Volegno, Theaterangestellter
- Angelo Ferrari as Der Inspizient der Mailänder Scala
- Walter Schramm-Duncker as Gast beim Silvester-Ball
- Herbert Weißbach as Gast beim Silvester-Ball
- Roma Bahn as Gast beim Silvester-Ball
- Else Ehser as Eine Verehrerin von Harrys Klavierspiel
- Willi Schur as Der "Weltuntergangsverkünder"
- Klaus Pohl as Der schwerhörige Mann beim "Weltuntergang"
- Egon Brosig as Der Ober im Restaurant
- Hans Junkermann as Der Theaterdiener
- Gertrud de Lalsky as Rosis Garderobenfrau
- Paul Schneider-Duncker as Der Direktor beim Empfang nach der Premiere
- Max Wilmsen as Der Hotelportier in Neapel
- Bobby Todd as Der Inspizient in der Oper von Bologna

== Bibliography ==
- Bagnoli, Giorgio. The La Scala Encyclopedia of the Opera. Simon and Schuster, 1993.
- Waldman, Harry. Nazi Films in America, 1933–1942. McFarland, 2008.
- Barron, Emma. Popular High Culture in Italian Media, 1950–1970: Mona Lisa Covergirl. Springer, 2018.
