= The Island Monster =

- Directed by: Roberto Bianchi Montero
- Written by: Roberto Bianchi Montero; Carlo Lombardo; Alberto Vecchietti
- Produced by: Fortunato Misiano
- Starring: Boris Karloff; Franca Marzi; Germana Paolieri
- Cinematography: Augusto Tiezzi
- Edited by: Jolanda Benvenuti
- Music by: Carlo Innocenzi
- Production company: Romana Film
- Distributed by: Siden Film
- Release date: 2 January 1954
- Running time: 87 minutes
- Country: Italy
- Language: Italian

The Island Monster (Italian: Il mostro dell'isola, lit. 'The Monster of the Island') is a 1954 Italian thriller film directed by Roberto Bianchi Montero and starring Boris Karloff, Franca Marzi and Germana Paolieri. It was made at Cinecitta Studios with location shooting taking place on the island of Ischia.

== Plot ==
Don Gaetano, an apparently respectable man but the leader of a gang of traffickers, kidnaps a little girl to force a policeman not to investigate; the latter, aided by a woman of the gang, frees the child and arrests the criminals.

== Cast ==
- Boris Karloff as Don Gaetano
- Franca Marzi as Gloria D'Auro
- Renato Vicario as Ten. Mario Andreani
- Patrizia Remiddi as Fiorella Andreani
- Jole Fierro as Giulia
- Carlo Duse as Foster
- Germana Paolieri as Adalgisa
- Giuseppe Chinnici as Maresciallo Antonio Carcani
- Giulio Battiferri as Il rapitore
- Domenico De Nimmo as Uomo di Pozzuoli
- Clara Gamberini as La contessa
- Salvatore Scibetta as Col. Della Finanza

== Bibliography ==
- Barry Atkinson. Atomic Age Cinema: The Offbeat, the Classic and the Obscure. Midnight Marquee, 2013.
- Lawrence McCallum. Italian Horror Films of the 1960s: A Critical Catalog of 62 Chillers. McFarland & Company, 1998.
