= Jacopo Ortis =

- Directed by: Giuseppe Sterni
- Written by: Ugo Foscolo (novel)
- Produced by: Milano Film
- Starring: Paola Borboni, Ernestina Badalutti, and Vittorio Brombara
- Release date: April 1918 (Italy)
- Country: Italy
- Language: Silent

Jacopo Ortis is a 1916 Italian silent drama film directed by Giuseppe Sterni and based on the novel Le ultime lettere di Jacopo Ortis by Ugo Foscolo.

It was the debut film of Paola Borboni.

== Cast ==
- Ernestina Badalutti
- Paola Borboni
- Luigi Duse
- Elisa Finazzi
- Angelo Giordani
- Giulio Grassi
- Virginio Mezzetti
- Vittorio Pieri
- Felicita Prosdocimi
- Mary Cleo Tarlarini
- Carlo Trouchez
