= Don Pasquale (1940 film) =

1940 film directed by Camillo Mastrocinque

- Directed by: Camillo Mastrocinque
- Written by: Alessandro De Stefani; Giuseppe De Santis; Camillo Mastrocinque; Gianni Puccini
- Produced by: Giovanni Addessi
- Starring: Armando Falconi; Laura Solari
- Cinematography: Carlo Montuori
- Music by: Alessandro Cicognini
- Release date: 1940
- Language: Italian

Don Pasquale is a 1940 Italian comedy film directed by Camillo Mastrocinque and starring Armando Falconi, Laura Solari and Maurizio D'Ancora. It is loosely based on Giovanni Ruffini's libretto for Gaetano Donizetti's opera buffa Don Pasquale. It was screened at the 8th Venice International Film Festival.

== Plot ==
In eighteenth-century Rome, Don Pasquale Corneto, very miserly, wishes his young nephew Ernesto, dedicated to an expensive social life, to marry a rich spinster, both to save on the expenses of her maintenance and to increase the family wealth. Ernesto, however, is in love, reciprocated, with Norina, a beautiful and brilliant singer of the "Pallacorda" theater, but fears, if it were known, of being disinherited. Faced with his resistance, the uncle then decides to take a wife himself and asks his doctor, Doctor Malatesta, to find him an available girl.

The Doctor and Ernesto agree to propose Norina to him, presenting her as Sofronia, naive nephew of the doctor who has just come out of a boarding school. But Norina, anything but naive, manages to get the elderly miser to sign a marriage contract that makes her the owner of all his possessions. Meanwhile, Ernesto, to make Norina jealous, pretends to woo Arianna. Finally, when Don Pasquale discovers that the marriage contract is invalid, in order to free himself from the headaches and expenses that the young woman is causing him, he finally agrees to the marriage between Ernesto and Norina.

== Cast ==
- Armando Falconi as Don Pasquale
- Laura Solari as Norina/ Sofronia
- Maurizio D'Ancora as Ernesto
- Greta Gonda as Arianna
- Franco Coop as Dr. Malatesta
- Fausto Guerzoni as Remigio
- Diana Torrieri as Zelinda
- Marcello Giorda as Notary
- Aristide Baghetti as Liborio
- Nico Pepe as Sebastiano, The Painter
- Elio Steiner as Fabrizio
- Gino Sabbatini as The Abbot
- Giuseppe Pierozzi as Tancredi
- Giuseppe Zago as Olimpio
- Oreste Bilancia as Cicisbeo #1
- Nino Eller as Cicisbeo #2
- Claudio Ermelli as Cicisbeo #3
- Annette Ciarli as Girl at the Theatre
- Pina Renzi as A Commoner
