= The Man Who Smiles =

1936 film

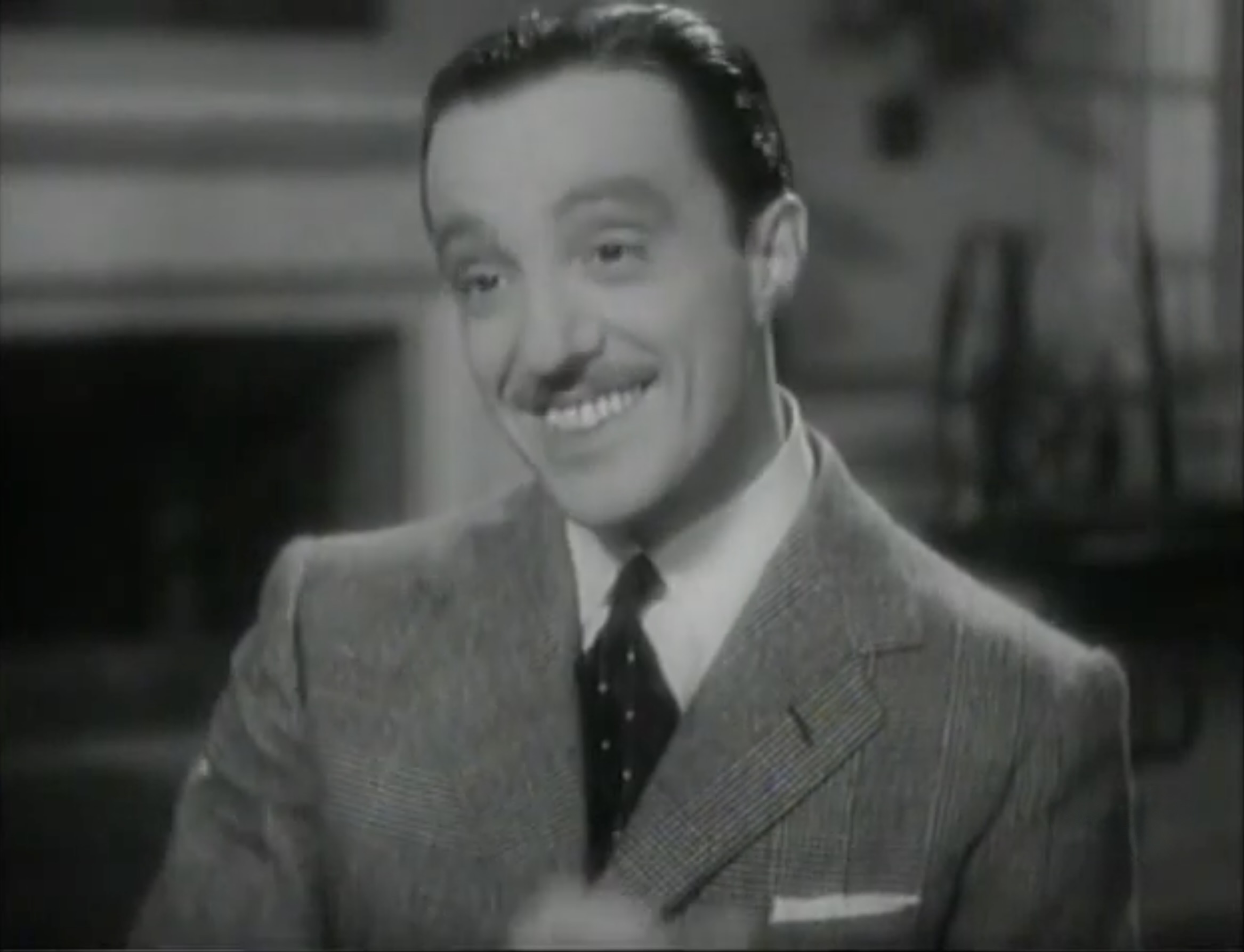
- De Sica in a film scene
- Directed by: Mario Mattoli
- Written by: Luigi Bonelli
- Produced by: Giuseppe Amato
- Starring: Vittorio De Sica, Umberto Melnati, Enrico Viarisio, Assia Noris and Paola Borboni
- Cinematography: Arturo Gallea
- Edited by: Fernando Tropea
- Music by: Cesare A. Bixio
- Release date: 1936
- Country: Italy
- Language: Italian

The Man Who Smiles (Italian: L'uomo che sorride) is a 1936 Italian "white-telephones" comedy film about an Oedipus Complex, directed by Mario Mattoli. The film stars Vittorio De Sica, Umberto Melnati, Enrico Viarisio, Assia Noris and Paola Borboni. It is based on a play by Aldo De Benedetti.It was shot at the Tirrenia Studios.

The film premiered in the USA on 16 April 1937.

== Cast ==
- Vittorio De Sica as Pio Fardella
- Umberto Melnati as Dino
- Enrico Viarisio as Commendator Ercole Piazza
- Assia Noris as Adriana
- Paola Borboni as La contessa
- Armando Migliari as Agostino
- Luisa Garella as Edvige
- Vanna Vanni
- Ermanno Roveri
