= Guglielmo Sinaz =

Italian actor

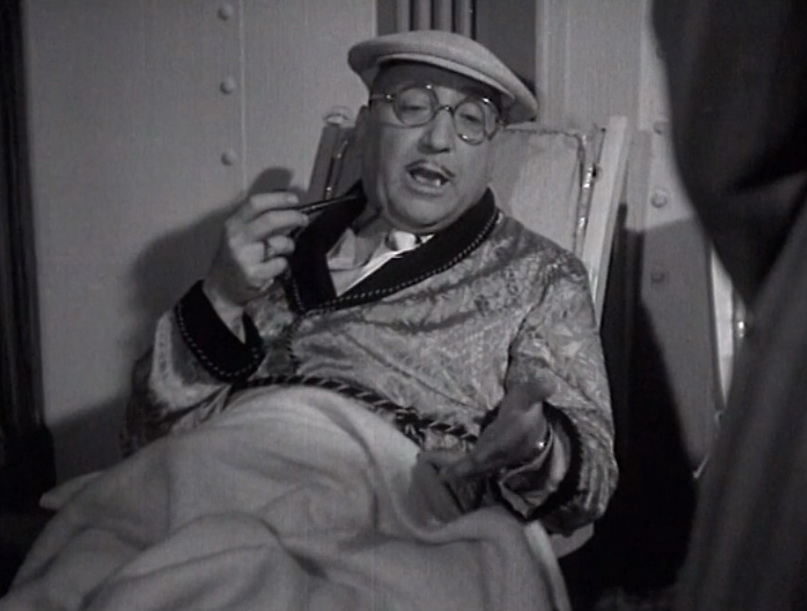
- Sinaz in A Husband for the Month of April, 1941
- Born: 20 November 1885; Rome, Italy
- Died: 5 February 1947 (aged 61); Rome, Italy
- Occupation: Actor
- Years active: 1935-1947

Guglielmo Sinaz (20 November 1885 – 5 February 1947) was an Italian film actor. He appeared in more than 60 films between 1935 and 1947. He was born and died in Rome, Italy.

== Selected filmography ==
- I Love You Only (1935)
- The Great Appeal (1936)
- It Was I! (1937)
- Hands Off Me! (1937)
- The Last Enemy (1938)
- Luciano Serra, Pilot (1938)
- Naples of Olden Times (1938)
- Star of the Sea (1938)
- All of Life in One Night (1938)
- The Cuckoo Clock (1938)
- Princess Tarakanova (1938)
- We Were Seven Sisters (1939)
- Diamonds (1939)
- The Silent Partner (1939)
- Non me lo dire! (1940)
- Then We'll Get a Divorce (1940)
- The Prisoner of Santa Cruz (1941)
- Light in the Darkness (1941)
- A Husband for the Month of April (1941)
- Bengasi (1942)
- Two Hearts (1943)
- Harlem (1943)
- Without a Woman (1943)
- Before Him All Rome Trembled (1946)
- The Great Dawn (1947)
