= Mimì Aylmer =

Italian actress (1896–1992)

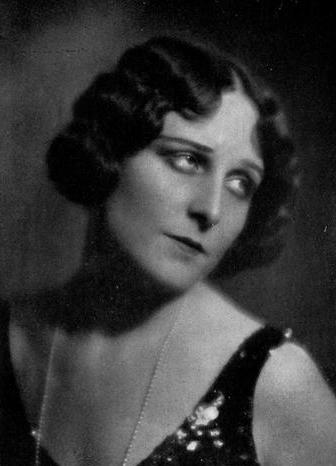
- Mimì Aylmer in 1929
- Born: Eugenia Spadoni; 29 May 1896; Rome, Kingdom of Italy
- Died: 20 October 1992 (aged 96); Bologna, Italy
- Occupation: Actress
- Years active: 1914–1951 (film)

Mimì Aylmer (29 May 1896 – 20 October 1992) was an Italian stage and film actress. Aylmer emerged as a star in the Fascist era, appearing in films such as the drama Like the Leaves (1935).

== Life and career ==
Born Eugenia Spadoni in Rome into a bourgeois Pisan family, she debuted in 1913 at the age of seventeen as a chanteuse and was immediately hired by the Riviste Papa stage company. In 1914 she starred in her first film, Colei che tutto soffre by Amleto Palermi, and was a major star for over twenty years, until 1936. After the war, she appeared in two films in character roles, then she definitely retired from showbusiness in 1959 and in 1964 she moved to Bologna to stay in a rest home for artists.

== Selected filmography ==
- The Telephone Operator (1932)
- Two Happy Hearts (1932)
- Like the Leaves (1935)
- Lohengrin (1936)
- Bayonet (1936)
- Hearts at Sea (1950)
- Revenge of the Pirates (1951)
