= The Missing Treaty =

1933 film directed by Mario Bonnard

- Directed by: Mario Bonnard
- Written by: Mario Bonnard
- Based on: The Missing Treaty by Riccardo Artuffo and Leo Galetto
- Produced by: Mario Bonnard
- Starring: Ernesto Sabbatini; Leda Gloria; Mino Doro
- Cinematography: Carlo Montuori
- Edited by: Mario Bonnard
- Music by: Giulio Bonnard
- Production company: Cines-Pittaluga
- Distributed by: Società Anonima Stefano Pittaluga
- Release date: 1933
- Running time: 78 minutes
- Country: Italy
- Language: Italian

The Missing Treaty (Italian: Il trattato scomparso) is a 1933 Italian mystery film directed by Mario Bonnard and starring Ernesto Sabbatini, Leda Gloria and Mino Doro. It was shot at the Cines Studios in Rome. The film's sets were designed by the art director Gastone Medin. A separate French version, Le masque qui tombe, was also produced.

== Synopsis ==
A document containing information about a new secret weapon is stolen from the safe in an admiral's house. Inspector Brown of the police is called in to investigate.

== Cast ==
- Ernesto Sabbatini as L'ammiraglio Morstan
- Leda Gloria as Anna - sua figlia
- Mino Doro as Carlo - suo figlio
- Giuditta Rissone as Miss Alice Baskerville
- Nini Dinelli as Contessa Clara di Roussel
- Memo Benassi as John Brown - detective
- Fosco Giachetti as Giorgio Raytham - comandante
- Lamberto Picasso as Il barone Fersen
- Alexandre Mihalesco as Jackie - il domestico
- Oreste Fares as Mister Baskerville
- Giovanni Ferrari as Un autista

== Bibliography ==
- Curti, Roberto. Italian Giallo in Film and Television: A Critical History. McFarland, 2022.
- Goble, Alan. The Complete Index to Literary Sources in Film. Walter de Gruyter, 1999.
