= Love and Poison (film) =

- Directed by: Giorgio Simonelli
- Written by: Siro Angeli; Gian Bistolfi; Carlo Campogalliani; Amleto Fattori; Anton Giulio Majano
- Produced by: Enrico Bomba
- Starring: Amedeo Nazzari; Lois Maxwell; Marisa Merlini
- Cinematography: Mario Montuori
- Edited by: Giuseppe Vari
- Music by: Salvatore Allegra
- Production companies: Herald Pictures; Ideal; La Perla; Rocket Films
- Distributed by: Jewel Productions
- Release date: 1950
- Running time: 80 minutes
- Country: Italy
- Language: Italian

Love and Poison (Italian: Amori e veleni) is a 1950 Italian historical adventure film directed by Giorgio Simonelli and starring Amedeo Nazzari, Lois Maxwell and Marisa Merlini. It was released in America in 1952, and is sometimes dated by that year. The film was shot at the Cinecittà Studios in Rome.

Set in the mid-seventeenth century, it portrays a romance between Queen Christina of Sweden and an Italian during her stay in Rome.

== Plot ==
17th century. Queen Christina of Sweden is in Rome, guest of a cardinal who hopes to convert her to Catholicism. One evening, after a tiring hunting party, Cristina, with her entourage, asks for hospitality from the Duke of Ceri, who has recently arrived in his castle with his young wife Annamaria. Santinelli, captain of the queen's guard and her favourite, falls in love with the young duchess. This passion naturally arouses the queen's jealousy. The duchess's sister-in-law takes advantage of her situation, anxious to get rid of Annamaria, whose marriage to her duke has robbed her son of any hope of an inheritance. With the complicity of the Baron of Aversa, she poisons the duke, ensuring that Annamaria is found guilty of the poisoning. Arrested and fallen into the hands of the Baron of Aversa, the young widow is taken to the Ceri castle, where she is exposed to the deadly hatred of her sister-in-law. Knowing she was in danger, Santinelli rushed to her aid and, meeting d'Aversa, killed her. The sister-in-law tries to stab Annamaria, but her son intervenes and receives the blow intended for the duchess. Cristina renounces Santinelli's love and leaves for France.

== Cast ==
- Amedeo Nazzari as Franco Santinelli
- Lois Maxwell as Queen Christina
- Marisa Merlini as Orsola
- Olga Solbelli as Domitilla Baglioni
- Giulio Donnini as Gelasio Baglioni
- Massimo Sallusti as Carlo
- Anna Nievo as Annamaria Di Cerri
- Alfredo Varelli as Egidio d'Alvernia
- Afro Poli as Duke Di Cerri
- Italia Marchesini as Astrologa
- Cesare Fantoni
- Oscar Andriani
- Ave Ninchi
- Armando Furlai
- Corrado Nardi
- Riccardo Foti
- Lia Murano
- Amina Pirani Maggi
- Checco Durante
- Achille Togliani
- Greta Mandrà
- Claudio Giammi

== Bibliography ==
- Poppi, Roberto. I registi: dal 1930 ai giorni nostri. Gremese Editore, 2002.
