= Queen of the Scala =

1937 film

- Directed by: Camillo Mastrocinque; Guido Salvini
- Written by: Raffaele Calzini; Guido Salvini; Camillo Mastrocinque
- Produced by: Giuseppe Vittorio Sampieri
- Starring: Margherita Carosio; Nives Poli; Giuseppe Addobbati
- Cinematography: Václav Vích
- Edited by: Giorgio Simonelli
- Music by: Antonio Veretti
- Production company: Aprilla Film
- Distributed by: Films Paramount
- Release date: 1937
- Running time: 88 minutes
- Country: Italy
- Language: Italian

Queen of the Scala (Italian: Regina della Scala) is a 1937 Italian drama film directed by Camillo Mastrocinque and Guido Salvini and starring Margherita Carosio, Nives Poli and Giuseppe Addobbati.

The film's sets were designed by the art directors Virgilio Marchi. It was shot at the Tirrenia Studios and on location in Lombardy.

This was the first film of actresses Laura Solari and Elena Altieri.

== Partial cast ==
- Margherita Carosio as Marta Bianchi
- Nives Poli as La ballerina Luzia
- Giuseppe Addobbati as Guido Vernieri
- Mario Ferrari as Candido Ponti
- Olivia Fried as Olivia Ferry
- Bianca Stagno Bellincioni as Madame Chautemps
- Guido Papalini as Un giornalista
- Laura Solari
- Osvaldo Valenti
- Rubi Dalma

== Bibliography ==
- Enrico Lancia & Roberto Poppi. Le attrici: dal 1930 ai giorni nostri. Gremese Editore, 2003.
