= In the Country Fell a Star =

- Directed by: Eduardo De Filippo
- Written by: Peppino De Filippo (play); Eduardo De Filippo; Riccardo Freda; Ernesto Grassi
- Produced by: Peppino De Filippo
- Starring: Peppino De Filippo; Eduardo De Filippo; Rosina Lawrence; Oretta Fiume
- Cinematography: Mario Albertelli
- Edited by: Guido Ricci
- Music by: Luigi Avitabile; Cesare A. Bixio
- Production company: Defilm
- Distributed by: Cine Tirrenia
- Release date: 11 November 1939
- Running time: 86 minutes
- Country: Italy
- Language: Italian

In the Country Fell a Star (Italian: In campagna è caduta una stella) is a 1939 Italian comedy film directed by Eduardo De Filippo. It stars De Filippo, his brother Peppino De Filippo and Rosina Lawrence. When a famous American film star visits their small town, two brothers become obsessed with her and neglect their fiancées. It was based on the play A Coperchia è caduta una stella written in 1933 by Peppino De Filippo.

== Cast ==
- Rosina Lawrence as Margaret, l'americana
- Eduardo De Filippo as Pasquale Montuori
- Peppino De Filippo as Luigino Montuori
- Oretta Fiume as Rosina, la fidanzata di Luigino
- Dolores Palumbo as Clotilde
- Gorella Gori as La moglie de Teodorico
- Elena Altieri as La cognata di Margaret
- Adele Mosso as Zia Rita
- Gina Amendola as La governante di casa Montuori
- Armando Migliari as Teodorico, il farmacista
- Guido Notari as Il suocero di Margaret
- Edoardo Toniolo as Il fidanzato di Margaret
- Emilio Petacci as Il padre di Clotilde

== Bibliography ==
- Moliterno, Gino. Historical Dictionary of Italian Cinema. Scarecrow Press, 2008.
