= Star of the Sea (1938 film) =

1938 film

- Directed by: Corrado D'Errico
- Written by: Corrado D'Errico; Giacomo Dusmet; Ettore Maria Margadonna
- Produced by: Federico D'Avack
- Starring: Galliano Masini; Luisa Ferida; Germana Paolieri
- Cinematography: Akos Farkas
- Edited by: Eraldo Da Roma
- Music by: Costantino Ferri
- Production company: Imperator Film
- Distributed by: Variety Distribution
- Release date: 5 December 1938
- Running time: 80 minutes
- Country: Italy
- Language: Italian

Star of the Sea (Italian: Stella del mare) is a 1938 Italian "white-telephones" comedy film directed by Corrado D'Errico and starring Galliano Masini, Luisa Ferida and Germana Paolieri.

It was made at Cinecittà Studios. The film's sets were designed by Salvo D'Angelo.

== Cast ==
- Galliano Masini as Gianni Massari
- Luisa Ferida as Luisa
- Germana Paolieri as Gemma Cherubini
- Mario Brizzolari as Il commendator Colombo
- Luigi Almirante as Nino Rossetti
- Guglielmo Sinaz as Francesco
- Nino Altieri
- Armando Arzalesi
- Giovanni Ferrari
- Walter Grant
- Fausto Guerzoni
- Carlo Lombardi
- Renato Malavasi
- Ferruccio Manzetti
- Gino Massi
- Pietro Nofri
- Ubaldo Noris
- Diego Pozzetto

== Bibliography ==
- Enrico Lancia. Dizionario del cinema italiano: Dal 1930 al 1944. Gremese Editore, 2005.
