= Carlo Duse =

Italian actor (1898–1956)

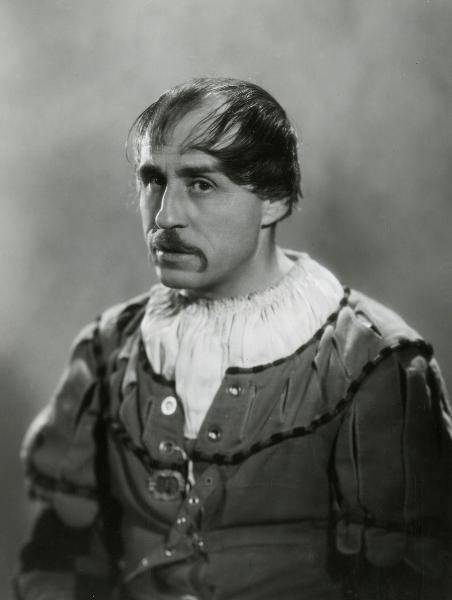
- Born: 5 January 1898; Udine, Italy
- Died: 9 September 1956 (aged 58); Rome, Italy
- Occupation: Actor
- Years active: 1916-1956

Carlo Duse (5 January 1898 – 9 September 1956) was an Italian film actor. He appeared in more than 80 films between 1916 and 1956. He was born in Udine, Italy and died in Rome, Italy.

== Selected filmography ==
- Uragano (1918)
- Il mistero della casa n. 30 (1920)
- Romola (1924) - Bargello (uncredited)
- Gli ultimi giorni di Pompei (1926) - Burbo
- Cento di questi giorni (1933) - Vito's Duel Assistant
- Villafranca (1934)
- The Blind Woman of Sorrento (1934) - Emisario borbonico
- Teresa Confalonieri (1934)
- The Last of the Bergeracs (1934)
- Aurora sul mare (1934)
- Le scarpe al sole (1935) - Tenente degli Alpini
- I Love You Only (1935) - Policeman
- The Joker King (1936) - Captain Ciro Romoa
- Music in the Square (1936)
- Tredici uomini e un cannone (1936) - Uomo #3
- Campo di maggio (1936) - Marchand
- Ginevra degli Almieri (1936)
- Condottieri (1937) - Minor Role (uncredited)
- Scipione l'africano (1937) - Messo di Magone
- The Ferocious Saladin (1937) - Movie director
- Il conte di Brechard (1938)
- Il torrente (1938) - Il parroco
- Under the Southern Cross (1938) - Donati
- Giuseppe Verdi (1938) - Temistocle Solera
- Pride (1938)
- Battles in the Shadow (1938) - Blanchard
- Ettore Fieramosca (1938) - Jacopo, lo scudiero spia di Graiano
- Piccoli naufraghi (1939) - Il controbbandiere
- Montevergine (1939) - Pietro Verdesi
- Traversata nera (1939)
- Backstage (1939) - (uncredited)
- An Adventure of Salvator Rosa (1939) - Il capitano della guardia
- The Secret of Villa Paradiso (1940) - Rosenberg
- Arditi civili (1940)
- Fanfulla da Lodi (1940) - Torvaspada
- Incanto di mezzanotte (1940)
- The Siege of the Alcazar (1940) - Il maggiore Ratto
- The Cavalier from Kruja (1940) - Argiropulos
- Abandonment (1940) - Richard
- La fanciulla di Portici (1940) - Il capitano don Diego Callegas
- Eternal Melodies (1940) - Il conte Arco
- Il re del circo (1941) - Carasso, il domatore
- Il signore a doppio petto (1941)
- La compagnia della teppa (1941) - Il barone Duvert, capo della polizia
- Beatrice Cenci (1941) - Il capitano dei gendarmi
- The Hero of Venice (1941) - Mastro Zaccaria
- Villa da vendere (1941) - Pedro "Carlomagno" Laroca
- The Betrothed (1941) - Il primo bravo (uncredited)
- La leggenda della primavera (1941) - Il messaggero
- Captain Tempest (1942) - Methiub
- Girl of the Golden West (1942) - Butler's employee
- Giarabub (1942) - L'ufficiale al telefono in trincea
- Bengasi (1942) - Il capitano Marchi
- Don Juan (1942)
- The Lion of Damascus (1942) - Methiub
- Don Cesare di Bazan (1942) - Il "Corvo", il messagero del visconte
- Forbidden Music (1942) - Il marchese Melzi
- I due Foscari (1942) - Vivarin
- Pazzo d'amore (1942) - Tom
- L'usuraio (1943)
- Spie fra le eliche (1943) - Pablo
- Tempesta sul golfo (1943) - Giudice del tribunale militare
- La valle del diavolo (1943)
- Special Correspondents (1943) - L'ufficiale di Stato Maggiore in Africa
- Mist on the Sea (1944) - Lopez, il creditore
- Before Him All Rome Trembled (1946) - Police Officer
- La monaca di Monza (1947)
- Anthony of Padua (1949) - Capitano delle guardie di Ezzelina
- Toto the Sheik (1950) - Un beduino
- Alina (1950, writer)
- Messalina (1951) - (uncredited)
- Little World of Don Camillo (1952) - Il Bigio
- Red Shirts (1952) - Bonnert
- La Colpa di una madre (1952, director)
- Puccini (1953) - Boito
- The Island Monster (1954) - Foster
- Concert of Intrigue (1954) - Counter-espionage agent
- The Two Orphans (1954)
- Il padrone sono me (1955) - Minor Role (uncredited)
- Don Camillo's Last Round (1955) - Bigio
- Wives and Obscurities (1956) - Minor Role (uncredited)
