= Mary Cleo Tarlarini =

Italian stage and film actress

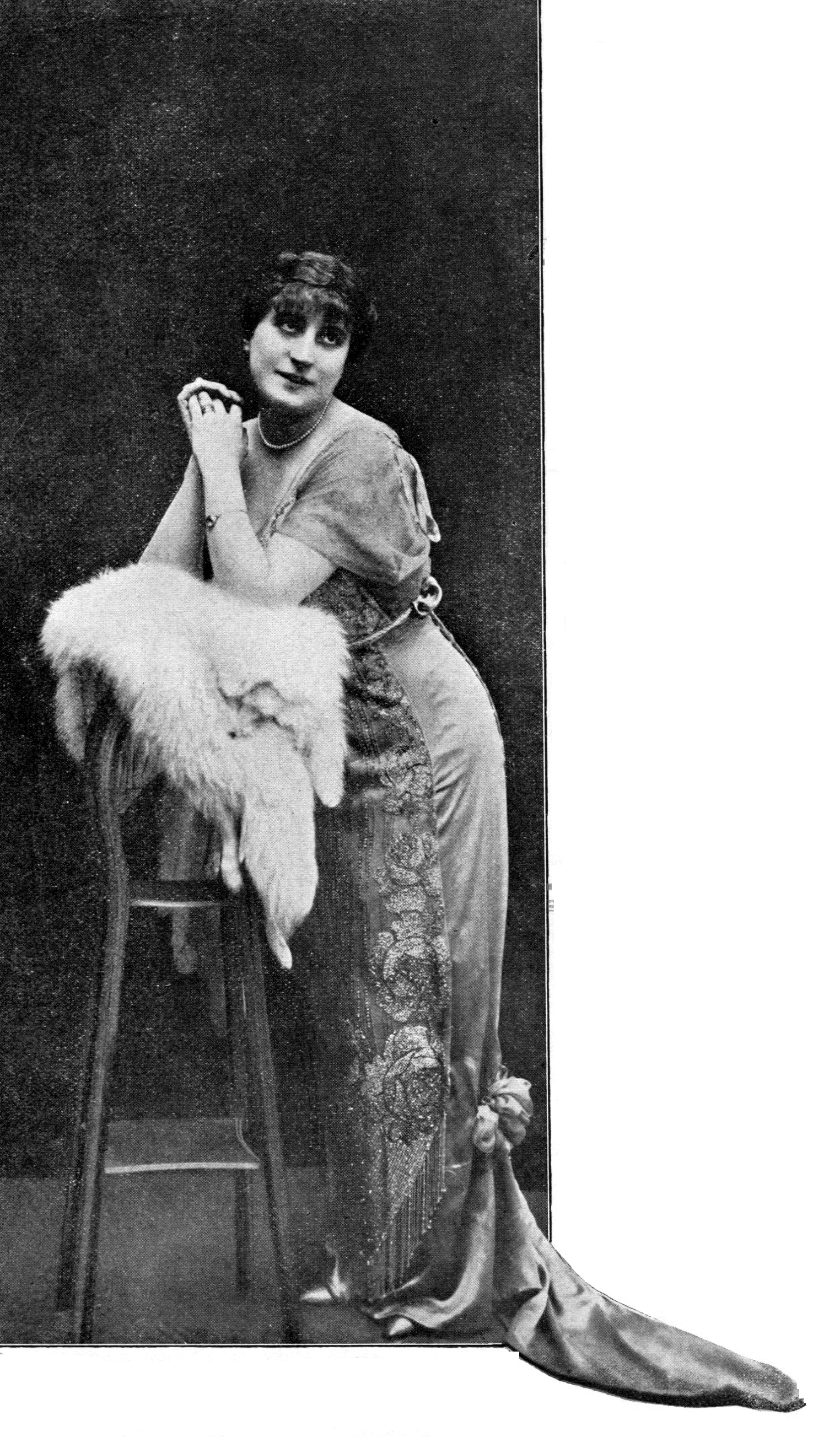
- Tarlarini in 1914
- Born: 22 April 1878; Milan, Lombardy, Italy
- Died: October 22, 1954 (aged 76); Tivoli, Lazio, Italy
- Occupation: Actress
- Years active: 1909-1949 (film)

Mary Cleo Tarlarini (1878–1954) was an Italian stage and film actress.

== Selected filmography ==
- Jacobo Ortis (1916)
- The Ship (1921)
- The Redemption (1924)
- La donna perduta (1940)

== Bibliography ==
- Wilcox, Vanda. Italy in the Era of the Great War. BRILL, 2018.
