= Unknown of Monte Carlo =

1939 film

- Theatrical film poster
- French: L'inconnue de Monte Carlo
- Directed by: André Berthomieu
- Written by: Renato Castellani; Jacques Constant; Mario Soldati
- Starring: Dita Parlo; Albert Préjean; Jules Berry
- Cinematography: Marcel Franchi; Fred Langenfeld
- Edited by: Henri Taverna
- Music by: Joe Hajos; Fred Spielman
- Production companies: Continentalcine; Franco London Films
- Distributed by: Franco London Films
- Release date: 26 January 1939
- Running time: 86 minutes
- Countries: France; Italy
- Language: French

Unknown of Monte Carlo (French: L'inconnue de Monte Carlo) is a 1939 French drama film directed by André Berthomieu and starring Dita Parlo, Albert Préjean and Jules Berry. A separate Italian version The Woman of Monte Carlo was also made.

== Cast ==
- Dita Parlo as Véra
- Albert Préjean as Georges Duclos
- Jules Berry as Messirian
- Claude Lehmann as André
- Henri de Livry
- Enrico Glori
- Jean Heuzé as Le détective
- Gaston Mauger
