= Bayonet (1936 film) =

1936 film

- Directed by: Ferdinando Maria Poggioli
- Written by: Alessandro De Stefani (novel); Baldassarre Negroni
- Produced by: Baldassarre Negroni
- Starring: Nerio Bernardi; Leda Gloria; Mimì Aylmer; Romolo Costa
- Cinematography: Otello Martelli
- Edited by: Ferdinando Maria Poggioli
- Music by: Dante Alderighi
- Production company: Negroni Film
- Distributed by: ENIC
- Release date: 1936
- Running time: 69 minutes
- Country: Italy
- Language: Italian

Bayonet (Italian:Arma bianca) is a 1936 Italian historical adventure film directed by Ferdinando Maria Poggioli and starring Nerio Bernardi, Leda Gloria and Mimì Aylmer. It portrays the life of Giacomo Casanova.

== Cast ==
- Nerio Bernardi as Giacomo Casanova
- Leda Gloria as Manon, la ballerina
- Mimì Aylmer as Agata
- Romolo Costa as il duca di Parma
- Tina Lattanzi as la duchessa di Parma
- Antonio Centa as il servitore di Casanova
- Enzo Biliotti as conte Paliski
- Oreste Bilancia as cav. Kauffmann
- Cesare Zoppetti as magg. Bertolan
- Giuseppe Pierozzi as proprietario osteria
- Lydia Simoneschi as Marina, la figlia dell'oste
- Gino Viotti as Dubois
- Mauro Serra as carceriere
- Andrea Checchi as attendente del duca

== Bibliography ==
- Moliterno, Gino. Historical Dictionary of Italian Cinema. Scarecrow Press, 2008.
