= Thrill (1941 film) =

1941 film

- Directed by: Giacomo Gentilomo
- Written by: Alessandro De Stefani; Mino Caudana; Giacomo Gentilomo; Mario Monicelli
- Based on: Thrill by Alessandro De Stefani
- Produced by: Mario Borghi; Amedeo Predassi
- Starring: Umberto Melnati; María Mercader; Clara Calamai
- Cinematography: Giuseppe La Torre
- Edited by: Renzo Lucidi
- Music by: Ulisse Siciliani
- Production company: Industria Cinematografica Italiana
- Distributed by: ENIC
- Release date: 12 October 1941
- Running time: 82 minutes
- Country: Italy
- Language: Italian

Thrill (Italian: Brivido) is a 1941 Italian mystery thriller film directed by Giacomo Gentilomo and starring Umberto Melnati, María Mercader and Clara Calamai. It was based on a play of the same title by Alessandro De Stefani. It was shot at the Pisorno Studios in Tirrenia. The film's sets were designed by the art director Veniero Colasanti.

== Cast ==
- Umberto Melnati as Ugo Palffy
- María Mercader as Cristina Palffy
- Clara Calamai as Federica Usticky
- Andrea Checchi as Mattia Cintra
- Carlo Campanini as Giorgio Szegedy
- Sandro Ruffini as Ignazio Usticky
- Pina Renzi as Matilde
- Ernesto Almirante as Isidoro Janosky
- Giacomo Moschini as Un ispettore di polizia

== Bibliography ==
- Curti, Roberto. Italian Giallo in Film and Television: A Critical History. McFarland, 2022.
- Goble, Alan. The Complete Index to Literary Sources in Film. Walter de Gruyter, 1999.
