= Hearts at Sea =

Cuori sul mare
- Directed by: Giorgio Bianchi
- Written by: Nicola Manzari
- Produced by: Carlo Civallero
- Cinematography: Mario Craveri
- Music by: Enzo Masetti
- Release date: 1950
- Running time: 95 minutes
- Country: Italy
- Language: Italian

Hearts at Sea (Italian: Cuori sul mare) is a 1950 Italian adventure film directed by Giorgio Bianchi. Sophia Loren appears as an uncredited extra.

== Plot ==
Three students of the Naval Academy face the beginning of their nautical career, between new impossible loves, fears of water, and choices of gratitude.

== Cast ==
- Doris Dowling - Doris
- Jacques Sernas - Paolo Silvestri
- Milly Vitale - Fioretta
- Charles Vanel - Nurus
- Marcello Mastroianni - Massimo Falchetti
- Paolo Panelli - Un marinaio
- Gualtiero Tumiati
- Enzo Biliotti
- Nicola Morabito
- Aldo Fiorelli
- Mimì Aylmer
- Dina Perbellini
- Sophia Loren - Extra (uncredited)
