= We the Living (film) =

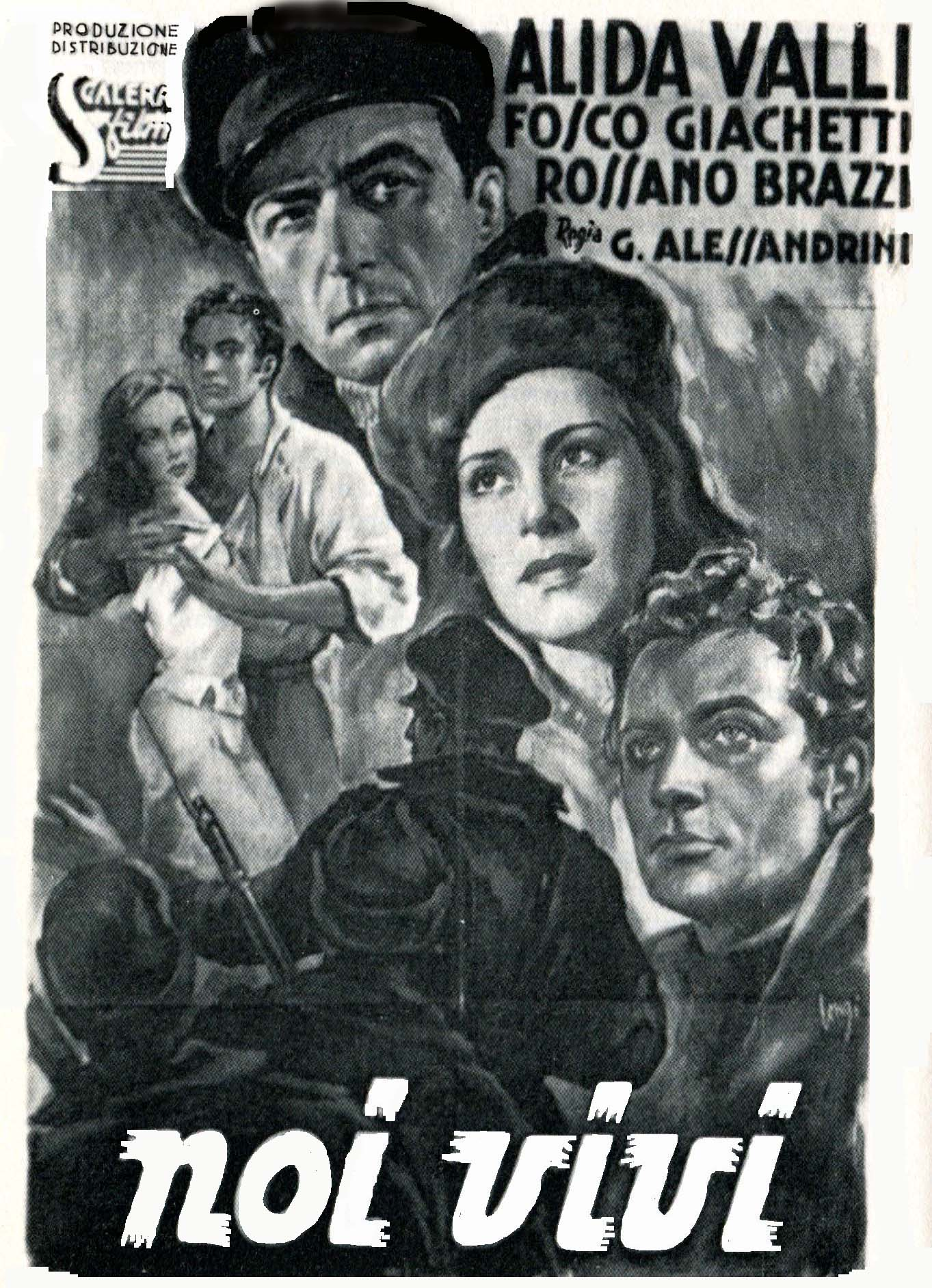
- Original film poster
- Directed by: Goffredo Alessandrini
- Screenplay by: Corrado Alvaro; Orio Vergani; Anton Giulio Majano; Goffredo Alessandrini; Oreste Biancoli
- Based on: We the Living by Ayn Rand
- Starring: Alida Valli; Rossano Brazzi; Fosco Giachetti
- Cinematography: Giuseppe Caracciolo
- Edited by: Eraldo Da Roma
- Music by: Renzo Rossellini
- Production company: Scalera Film
- Release date: 14 September 1942 (Italy)
- Running time: 172 minutes (re-release)
- Country: Italy
- Language: Italian

We the Living is a two-part 1942 Italian romantic war drama film, based on Ayn Rand's 1936 novel of the same name. It was originally released as two films, Noi vivi (literally "We the living") and Addio Kira ("Goodbye Kira"). It was directed by Goffredo Alessandrini and produced by Scalera Film, and stars Alida Valli as Kira Argounova, Rossano Brazzi as Leo Kovalensky, and Fosco Giachetti as Andrei Taganov.

The nominally anti-communist, but de facto anti-authoritarian film was made and released in Italy during World War II, before being banned by the Fascist government and pulled from theaters. The film was lost and forgotten for decades, then found and restored with Rand's involvement. It was released for the first time in the United States in 1986.

== Cast ==
- Alida Valli as Kira Argounova
- Rossano Brazzi as Leo Kovalensky
- Fosco Giachetti as Andrei Taganov
- Giovanni Grasso as Tishenko
- Emilio Cigoli as Pavel Syerov
- Cesarina Gheraldi as Comrade Sonia
- Mario Pisu as Victor Dunaev
- Guglielmo Sinaz as Morozov
- Gero Zambuto as Alexei Argounov
- Annibale Betrone as Vassili Dunaev
- Elvira Betrone as Maria Petrovna Dunaev
- Sylvia Manto as Marisha
- Claudia Marti as Lydia Argounova
- Evelina Paoli as Galina Petrovna Argounova
- Gina Sammarco as Tonia
- Lamberto Picasso as GPU Captain
- Sennuccio Benelli as Sasha
- Gioia Collei as Ada Dunaev
- Bianca Doria as Irina Dunaev

== Production ==
=== Background ===
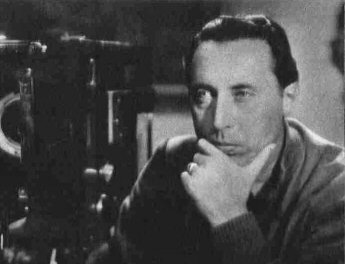
Director Goffredo Alessandrini

The film version of Ayn Rand's novel We the Living was made in Italy by Scalera Films in 1942. Rand's novel was considered a political hot potato by Fascist authorities in Rome, but was approved for filming due to the intervention of dictator Benito Mussolini's son. Goffredo Alessandrini, one of Italy's leading directors, and his young associate director, Anton Giulio Majano, knew that We the Living touched on volatile political issues, but they hoped they would be safe from repercussions because of the story's negative portrayal of the Soviet Union, Italy's wartime enemy. Alessandrini was a very successful director during Benito Mussolini's regime. His films are noted for their extreme realism, and have been lauded as anticipating the Neo-Realist movement that was to follow the end of the war. Although, initially, his films were influenced by his brief stay in Hollywood in the early 1930s for MGM Studios, he successfully made the transition from musical comedies to historical dramas and ideological propaganda films when the tide of war changed the focus of filmmaking.

=== Rights and writing ===
The studio never secured the movie rights from Rand, who at the time lived in the United States. Europe was at war, and the Fascist Ministry of Culture set up special laws with regards to negotiations for rights and copyrights with enemy countries, making it impossible to buy the rights. The film was made without the novelist's consent or knowledge, and no attempt was later made to compensate her.

The first script was adapted from the book by two Italian novelists, but director Alessandrini abandoned their script. He and his assistant decided to make the picture without a finished script. The script was often written the day before filming or pulled directly from the novel, resulting in an adaptation that was more faithful to the novel than is typical in film adaptations.

Working without a complete script, they were inadvertently shooting more material than could be edited down to one film, so it was decided that the film would be released as two separate movies entitled, Noi Vivi (We the Living) and Addio Kira (Goodbye Kira).

=== Casting and shooting ===
Cast in the leading roles were three of Italy's top box-offices attractions: 38-year-old Fosco Giachetti, a star of such magnitude that his casting was unquestioned, in the role of Andrei; Alida Valli, already a major star in Italy, played the role of Kira; and Rossano Brazzi played Leo. When We the Living was made in 1942, Brazzi was already among the highest paid Italian film stars, and at age 21, Alida Valli was also one of Italy's highest paid actresses. Many of the extras were White emigres from Russia living in Rome, and production designers were also born in Russia. Due to the difficulty in securing location permits during the war, the film was shot on Scalera sound stages.

Future leading man Raf Vallone appeared in the film as an extra. Ironically, in spite of the film's anti-Communist subject matter, Vallone was actually an ardent leftist and member of the banned Italian Communist Party. Prior to World War II, he worked as culture editor for the party's official newspaper L'Unità. At the same time the film was being shot, Vallone was a secret agent for the anti-fascist Italian resistance, as a member of the Communist-affiliated 'Brigate Garibaldi' partisans.

== Opening and reception ==
DVD cover

On September 14, 1942, the film premiered at the Venice Film Festival. When the movie opened in Rome, it was a box-office success. The portrayal of an intelligent, sexually independent heroine was viewed as controversial. Shortly after its theatrical release, the Italian Government banned the film for reasons mentioned below.

=== Censorship ===
Prior to the films' release, they were nearly censored by Mussolini's government. Government officials demanded to see the film dailies, but the editors hid any sensitive material. The release of the films was permitted because the story itself was set in Soviet Russia and was directly critical of that regime. Rand was later told that the films were "released in Italy, played for two months with great success - and then the Italian newspapers began objecting to it and saying that it was anti-Fascist, which it was, essentially." Consequently, the Fascist government demanded the films be pulled from theaters and withdrawn from circulation. Furthermore, the films were ordered to be destroyed. In an attempt to save the films, Massimo Ferrara, the studio chief for Scalera Films, hid the original negatives with a trusted friend, then sent the negatives of another Scalera production to authorities to be destroyed.

=== Revision and re-release ===
Rand learned about the unauthorized adaptation of her novel in 1946. She saw the adaptation for the first time in 1947. Rand liked and was impressed by the films, but she resented the use of her story for Fascist propaganda and the addition of pro-Fascist and antisemitic dialogue. Initial efforts to re-release the film with Rand's approval were ended when she declined to grant the literary rights. In 1961, Rand settled her legal claims for damages from the adaptation and received a payment of 14 million Italian lire.

Following the settlement, Rand's lawyers, Erika Holzer and Henry Mark Holzer, went to Italy to find negatives for the films. The search ended in the summer of 1968 when it was discovered that a business entity that owned dozens of vintage Italian films had obtained the original films. The Holzers brought a copy back to the United States.

Shortly thereafter, Duncan Scott began working with Rand on re-editing the films Noi Vivi and Addio Kira. At this time, the two Italian films were combined into a single film with English subtitles. Certain subplots were cut to get the films down from four hours to a more manageable three-hour run-time. The film was edited to be more faithful to Rand's original novel, and during this time, they also rid the films of Fascist propaganda, which was a distortion of Rand's message. This new version produced by the Holzers and Duncan Scott and was approved by Rand and her estate. It was re-released as We the Living in 1986.

The new version of We the Living premiered at the Telluride Film Festival in Colorado in 1986 — the first public showing of the film outside of Italy since World War II. Soon after, it was released in theaters throughout the US, Canada, and overseas. Today, a two-disc DVD of the film is sold by Duncan Scott Productions.
