= Ernesto Sabbatini =

Italian stage and film actor

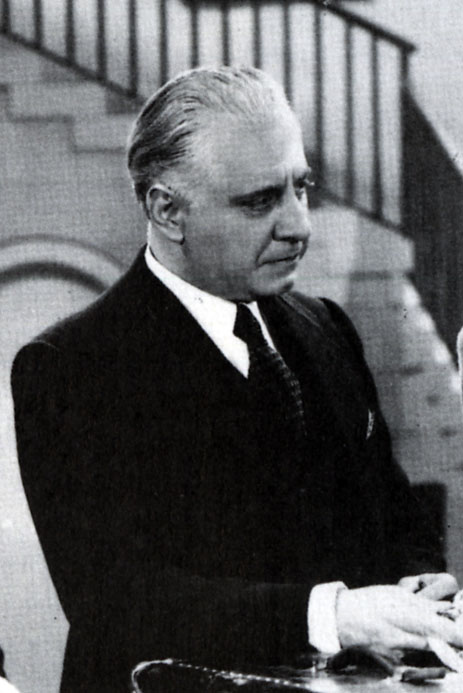
- Born: 8 September 1878; Padua, Veneto; Italy
- Died: 5 October 1954 (aged 76); Milan, Lombardy; Italy
- Occupation: Actor
- Years active: 1914–1954 (film)

Ernesto Sabbatini (8 September 1878 – 5 October 1954) was an Italian stage and film actor. Sabbatini emerged as a star in the Fascist era, appearing in films such as the drama Like the Leaves (1935).

== Selected filmography ==
- Anna Karenine (1917)
- The Prince of the Impossible (1918)
- My Little One (1933)
- The Missing Treaty (1933)
- Like the Leaves (1935)
- Grattacieli (1943)
- A Little Wife (1943)
- Maria Malibran (1943)
- No Turning Back (1945)
- Hand of Death (1949)

== Bibliography ==
- Landy, Marcia. The Folklore of Consensus: Theatricality in the Italian Cinema, 1930-1943. SUNY Press, 1998.
