= Salvatore Allegra =

Italian composer (1898–1993)

- Born: 13 July 1898; Palermo, Italy
- Died: 9 December 1993 (aged 95); Florence, Italy
- Occupation: Composer

Salvatore Allegra (13 July 1898, Palermo, Italy – 9 December 1993, Florence, Italy) was an Italian composer.

Allegra was born in Palermo. He composed a number of operettas in the 1920s, including Il gatto in cantina (1930), which is still performed sometimes, passing then to operas, such as the dark "verista" drama Ave Maria, which was first staged at La Scala in 1934, which was followed by I Viandanti (1936), Il Medico suo malgrado (1938) and Romulus (1952).

He completed and edited some last works of the late Ruggero Leoncavallo, including the one-act opera Edipo Re (1920) and the operetta Le maschere nude (1925).

After the war, he composed a number of musical scores for films, among which Amori e veleni (1950) with Amedeo Nazzari and directed by Giorgio Simonelli. He died in Florence.

== Selected filmography ==
- Lohengrin (1936)
- Marcella (1937)
- Abandonment (1940)
- The Actor Who Disappeared (1941)
- A Little Wife (1943)
- Love and Poison (1950)
- Nobody's Children (1951)
- Who is Without Sin (1952)
- Lieutenant Giorgio (1952)
- Final Pardon (1952)
