= A Little Wife =

- Directed by: Giorgio Bianchi
- Written by: Zoltán Nagyiványi (novel); Giorgio Bianchi; Sandro De Feo; Vincenzo Talarico
- Starring: Fosco Giachetti; Assia Noris; Clara Calamai
- Cinematography: Aldo Tonti
- Edited by: Leo Catozzo
- Music by: Salvatore Allegra
- Production company: Grandi Film
- Distributed by: Grandi Film
- Release date: 22 December 1943
- Running time: 76 minutes
- Country: Italy
- Language: Italian

A Little Wife (Italian: Una piccola moglie) is a 1943 Italian "white-telephones" drama film directed by Giorgio Bianchi and starring Fosco Giachetti, Assia Noris and Clara Calamai. It was shot at the Cinecittà Studios in Rome. The film's sets were designed by the art director Ottavio Scotti.

== Cast ==
- Fosco Giachetti as Giulio Nardi
- Assia Noris as Lauretta
- Clara Calamai as Isa
- Renato Cialente
- Augusto Marcacci
- Camillo Pilotto
- Dino Di Luca
- Armando Migliari
- Ernesto Sabbatini
- Paola Borboni
- Giorgio Costantini
- Totò Mignone
- Giacinto Molteni
- Nino Pavese
- Giuseppe Pierozzi
- Gina Sammarco
- Mario Siletti
- Amedeo Trilli
- Dianora Veiga

== Bibliography ==
- Roberto Chiti & Roberto Poppi. I film: Tutti i film italiani dal 1930 al 1944. Gremese Editore, 2005.
