= My Little One (1933 film) =

- Directed by: Eugenio de Liguoro
- Written by: Eugenio De Liguoro; Alessandro De Stefani
- Starring: Germana Paolieri; Ernesto Sabbatini; Alessandra De Stefani
- Cinematography: Ferdinando Martini
- Music by: Vittorio Mascheroni
- Production company: Tirennia Film
- Distributed by: Variety Distribution
- Release date: 25 November 1933
- Running time: 67 minutes
- Country: Italy
- Language: Italian

My Little One (Italian: Piccola mia) is a 1933 Italian drama film directed by Eugenio de Liguoro and starring Germana Paolieri, Ernesto Sabbatini and Alessandra De Stefani. A woman in a loveless marriage leaves her husband and child for another man.

It was shot at the Farnesina Studios in Rome. The film's sets were designed by Alfredo Montori.

== Cast ==
- Germana Paolieri as Maria Albani
- Ernesto Sabbatini as Ugo Albani - suo marito
- Alessandra De Stefani as La piccola Adriana - lora figlia
- Guido Celano as Paolo Vallini - il corridore automobilista
- Alessandro De Stefani
- Ernesto Marini as Cesarino
- Lola Braccini as Anna, la governante
- María Denis as La ragazza nel bar all'aperto
- Gino Viotti as Un impiegato della società automobilista
- Mario Siletti as Un vigile urbano
- Franco Coop

== Bibliography ==
- Chiti, Roberto & Poppi, Roberto. I film: Tutti i film italiani dal 1930 al 1944. Gremese Editore, 2005.
- Stewart, John. Italian Film: A Who's Who, McFarland, 1994.
