= Lohengrin (film) =

1936 film directed by Nunzio Malasomma

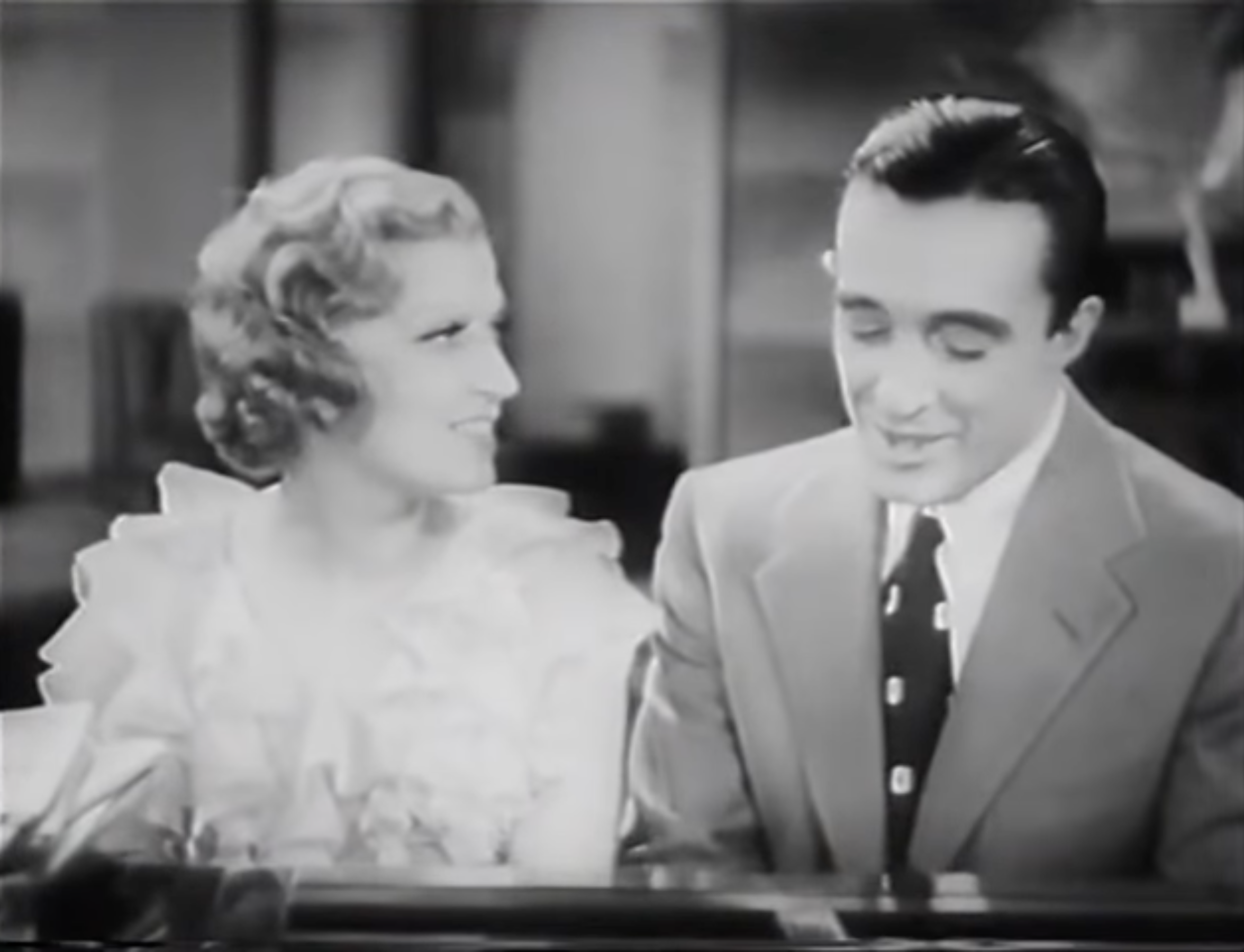
- Giuditta Rissone and Vittorio De Sica
- Directed by: Nunzio Malasomma
- Written by: Aldo De Benedetti; Fritz Eckardt; Nunzio Malasomma
- Produced by: Enrico Ventura
- Starring: Vittorio De Sica; Sergio Tofano; Mimi Aylmer
- Cinematography: Arturo Gallea
- Edited by: Eraldo Da Roma
- Music by: Salvatore Allegra
- Production company: Ventura Film
- Distributed by: Consorzio EIA
- Release date: 1936
- Running time: 75 minutes
- Country: Italy
- Language: Italian

Lohengrin is a 1936 Italian comedy film directed by Nunzio Malasomma and starring Vittorio De Sica, Sergio Tofano and Mimi Aylmer. It was shot at the Pisorno Studios in Tirrenia. The film's sets were designed by the art directors Arnaldo Foresti and Alfredo Montori.

== Cast ==
- Vittorio De Sica as Alfredo
- Sergio Tofano as Giulio
- Mimi Aylmer as Lia
- Giuditta Rissone as Marianna
- Cesare Zoppetti as Ravellini
- Giulio Oppi as Lohengrin
- Luigi Almirante as Edmondo
- Rosina Anselmi as Cesira
- Federico Collino as L'autista
- Franco Coop as Sebastiano - il maggiodormo
- Anna Maria Dossena as Adele
- Renato Navarrini as Il direttore dell'hotel
- Vinicio Sofia as Il venditore di mobili

== Bibliography ==
- Chiti, Roberto & Poppi, Roberto. I film: Tutti i film italiani dal 1930 al 1944. Gremese Editore, 2005.
- Goble, Alan. The Complete Index to Literary Sources in Film. Walter de Gruyter, 1999.
