= Like the Leaves =

1935 film

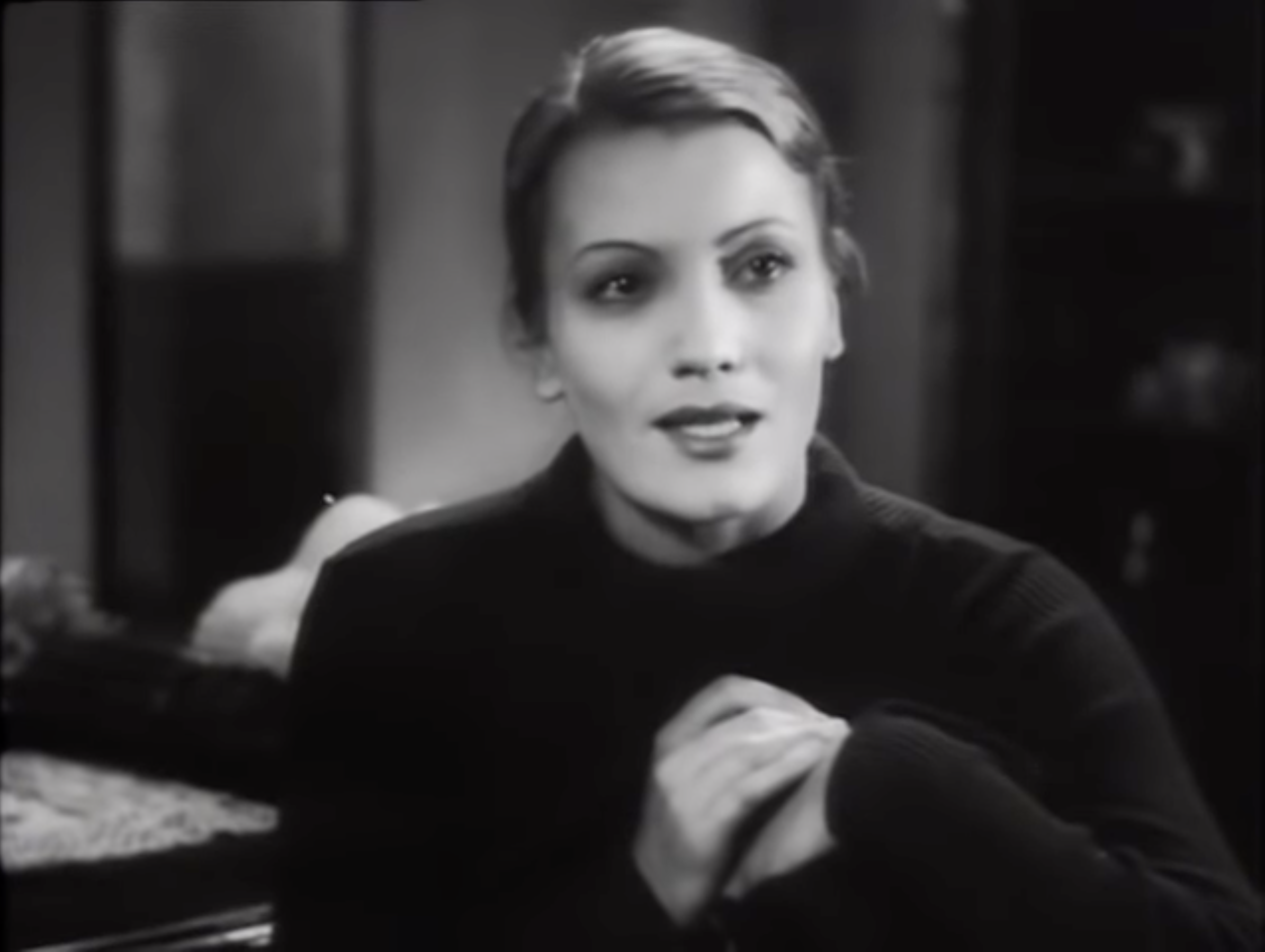
- Miranda in a film scene
- Directed by: Mario Camerini
- Written by: Giuseppe Giacosa (play); Ercole Patti; Ivo Perilli; Mario Camerini
- Produced by: Roberto Dandi
- Starring: Isa Miranda; Mimì Aylmer; Nino Besozzi; Ernesto Sabbatini
- Cinematography: Massimo Terzano
- Edited by: Fernando Tropea
- Music by: Ezio Carabella
- Production company: Industrie Cinematografiche Italiane (ICI)
- Distributed by: ICI
- Release date: 1935
- Running time: 80 minutes
- Country: Italy
- Language: Italian

Like the Leaves (Italian: Come le foglie) is a 1935 Italian drama film directed by Mario Camerini and starring Isa Miranda, Mimì Aylmer and Nino Besozzi. It was based on a play by Giuseppe Giacosa. The film radically altered the image of Miranda from her previous film Everybody's Woman (1934) in which she had played a glamorous film star. In this case she appeared as a modest middle-class woman. Miranda was widely praised for her performance, further enhancing her status as the leading Italian actress.

== Synopsis ==
After their father is ruined financially, his middle-class children go out to work. While most struggle, his daughter Nennele proves to be an unexpected success.

== Cast ==
- Isa Miranda as Nennele
- Mimì Aylmer as Giulia
- Nino Besozzi as Max
- Ernesto Sabbatini as Giovanni Rosani
- Cesare Bettarini as Tommy
- Achille Majeroni as Commander Casati
- Romolo Costa as Zoffoli
- Amina Pirani Maggi as Elena
- Michele Riccardini as Bernabei
- Ernesto Olivieri as Helmer Strile
- Amilcare Pettinelli as Advocat Riccardo Janni
- Albino Principe as Young Piano Player

== Reception ==
"The authors have been able to transport the action into the frame and time, without altering its plain lesson and intimate meaning. Even dressed in modern clothes and driving cars from 1935, the audience will recognize the Giacosian characters. If at some point the reworking does not seem radical enough and these contours seem rounded by too many theatrical elements, it will be necessary that without these circumspections it would not have been possible to save the spirit of the original work and give it the respect it deserved. Camerini has found the best accent of his direction this time. The film is one of his best and inspired works...", wrote Filippo Sacchi in the Corriere della Sera.

== Bibliography ==
- Gundle, Stephen (2013). Mussolini's Dream Factory: Film Stardom in Fascist Italy. New York: Berghahn Books. ISBN 978-1782382454.
