= I Want to Live with Letizia =

1938 film directed by Camillo Mastrocinque

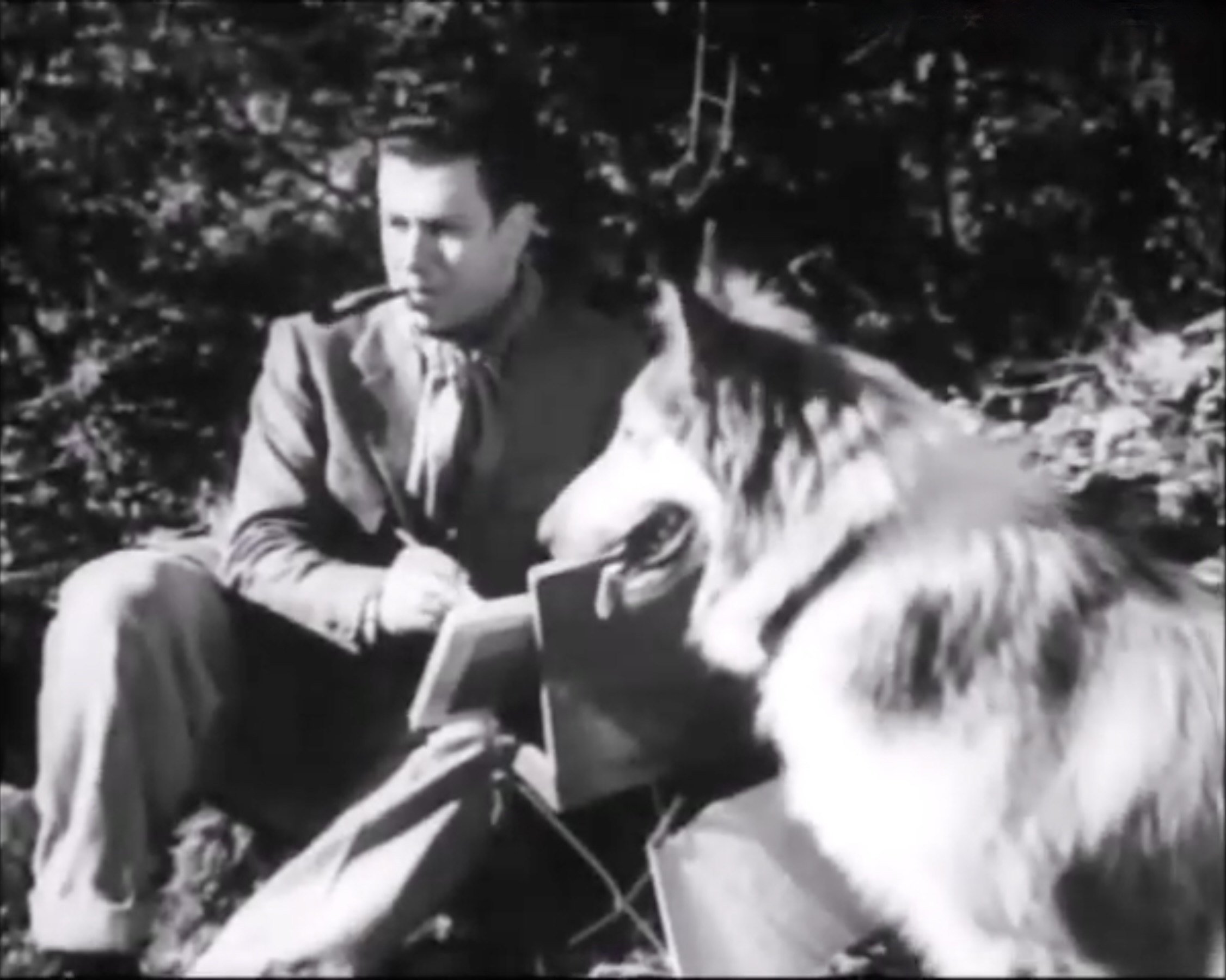
- Cervi in a film scene
- Directed by: Camillo Mastrocinque
- Written by: Giuseppe Guarino; Mario Soldati; Camillo Mastrocinque
- Starring: Assia Noris; Gino Cervi; Umberto Melnati
- Cinematography: Akos Farkas
- Edited by: Rita Roland
- Music by: Giuseppe Rosati
- Production company: S.A.P.E.C.
- Distributed by: Generalcine
- Release date: March 1938
- Running time: 85 minutes
- Country: Italy
- Language: Italian

I Want to Live with Letizia (Italian: Voglio vivere con Letizia) is a 1938 Italian "white-telephones" comedy film directed by Camillo Mastrocinque and starring Assia Noris, Gino Cervi and Umberto Melnati.

The film was shot at Cinecittà Studios in Rome. The sets were designed by art directors Guido Fiorini and Gastone Medin.

== Synopsis ==
To please his wealthy parents, Bebe agrees to an arranged marriage with Letizia, the daughter of an aristocratic family who have fallen on hard times. However, to ensure that she is not marrying him solely for his money, he sends his cousin to take his place while he pretends to be a penniless painter. Through this deception, he discovers that she genuinely loves him.

== Cast ==
- Assia Noris as Letizia
- Gino Cervi as Bebe
- Umberto Melnati as Il finto Bebe
- Bianca Stagno Bellincioni as La signora Barozzi
- Clara Padoa as La contessa Serravalle
- Enzo Biliotti as Osvaldo Tempera
- Marisa Vernati as Kiki
- Guglielmo Barnabò as Il signor Barozzi
- Pina De Angelis as Un'amica di Letizia
- Norma Nova as Stefania
- Aristide Baghetti as L'avvocato
- Tullia Baghetti as La suora
- Amalia Pellegrini as La governante

== Bibliography ==
- Chiti, Roberto & Poppi, Roberto . I film: Tutti i film italiani dal 1930 al 1944. Gremese Editore, 2005.
