= Gemma Bolognesi =

Italian actress (1894–1983)

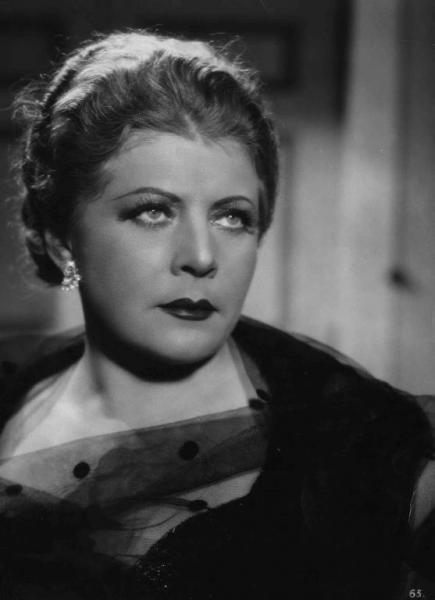
- Born: 4 November 1894; Cesenatico, Italy
- Died: 26 March 1983 (aged 88); Cesenatico, Italy
- Occupation: Actress
- Years active: 1916-1954

Gemma Bolognesi (4 November 1894 – 26 March 1983) was an Italian actress. She appeared in more than thirty films from 1916 to 1954.

== Biography ==
Bolognesi began acting at an early age and made her debut with the ensemble of the Teatro Manzoni in Milan under Marco Praga. In 1919 she became the ensemble's first actress alongside Aristide Baghetti and the following year led her ensemble with Ettore Berti. Further seasons of her stage career were alongside Enzo Biliotti (1921) and from 1922 to 1926 the Teatro del Popolo (as its first actress from 1924), again in Milan. The following season saw her in the theater company around Luigi Zoncada and later, in 1932, next to Carlo Tamberlani.

Bolognesi made her film debut in 1916 in Cura di baci by Emilio Graziani-Walter, but found little satisfaction with it, so she concentrated on her theater work. It was not until the mid-1930s, when the time of the big stage roles was over, that she developed into a sought-after character actress playing cultured women, who with her appearance with her blonde, luscious hair also gave her secondary roles the flair of "the Italian Mae West". After World War II she continued her film career until 1954 and then withdrew to her birthplace.

In the 1930s, Bolognesi also worked frequently for the EIAR, the Italian radio service.

== Selected filmography ==
Year	Title	Role	Notes
1935	I'll Give a Million		
1935	Aldebaran		
1935	Territorial Militia		
1936	Music in the Square		
1938	The Last Enemy		
1938	Ettore Fieramosca		
1938	The Cuckoo Clock		
1939	The Silent Partner		
1939	Father For a Night		
1939	I, His Father		
1939	The Sons of the Marquis Lucera		
1943	Sad Loves		
1943	The White Angel		
1944	Resurrection	Matriona	
1950	Ring Around the Clock		
1953	Siamo tutti inquilini		
1953	La valigia dei sogni		
1953	Gioventù alla sbarra		
1954	My Life Is Yours		

== Bibliography ==
- Scarpellini, Emanuela (2000). Il Teatro del popolo.
- Forgacs, David; Gundle, Stephen (2007). Mass Culture and Italian Society from Fascism to the Cold War. Indiana University Press.
- Lancia, Enrico; Poppi, Roberto (2003). Dizionario del cinema italiano. Le attrici. Rome.
