= Achille Majeroni (actor, born 1824) =

Achille Majeroni (1824 – 20 January 1888) was an Italian stage actor and manager of a theatrical company. He was the eldest brother of Eduardo Majeroni, who was well known in Australia. His son Achille Majeroni (1881–1964), was an actor with a film career.

== History ==
Majeroni was born in Milan, the eldest son of Eduardo Majeroni, a former officer under Napoleon I, and Antonia Majeroni, née Musich, who claimed noble Hungarian descent. The Majeronis were a long-established family in the Città Alta ("Upper Town") of Bergamo, Lombardy.

He joined the Giacomo Modena company in 1840, followed by Giacinto Battaglia's Lombard Drama Company, becoming their leading man in 1849 alongside Francesco Coltellini.

Like his youngest brother, he was imbued with patriotic fervor and fought in the First Italian War of Independence, and in the cholera outbreak that followed, was a volunteer with the Compagnia della Misericordia.

In 1854, he joined Adamo Alberti's Teatro dei Fiorentini, enjoying considerable success, especially in romantic dramas. In 1859, he undertook a world tour with Adelaide Ristori.

In 1866 he and Fanny Sadowski founded a company which toured Italy to considerable acclaim.

His depiction of Othello has been ranked with that of Tommaso Salvini, and was said to be a favorite of the King of Italy, who made him a Cavalier of the Crown of Italy. He received similar honors from the King of Spain and the King of Portugal.

He was buried at Bologna and the king telegraphed his condolences. During his lifetime, he had earned in the vicinity of £40,000 and squandered it all on a gracious lifestyle, and his widow and ten children were reduced to poverty.

== Personal ==
The family of Achille Majeroni includes:

- Concetta Luigia Gentile Majeroni (1857– )
- Mina Majeroni (1859–1861)
- Adélaïde Mathilde Julienne Majeroni (1859– )

In 1859 he married Graziosa Caldi-Bignetti, a.k.a. Graziosa Bignetti (1837–1919).

- Ferruccio Majeroni (1861–1927)
- Fede Italica Rosa Bianca Majeroni (1862– )
- Umberto Agesilao Masaniello Majeroni (1863– )
- Dante Majeroni (1863–1937)
- Emilia Majeroni (1864–1955)
- Angelica Eugenia Anna Majeroni (1865– )
- Torquato Majeroni (1868–1905)
- Vittorio Emmanuele Majeroni (1878– )
- Achille Majeroni (1881–1964) (source Achille Majeroni family tree)

The famous stage illusionist Amedeo Majeroni (1871–1932) was a grandson, a son of Michele Napoleone "Napoleon" Majeroni (1842–1918), not mentioned in the list above, and Adelaide Bruno (1845–1916)

== Sources ==
Alberto Manzi (1934), "Achille Majeroni" Dizionario biografico degli italiani, Istituto dell'Enciclopedia Italiana.
