= Umberto Melnati =

Italian film actor (1897–1979)

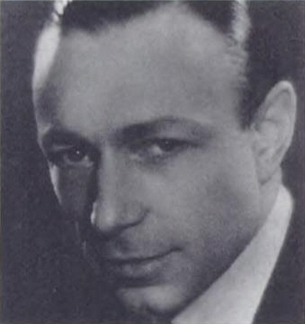
- Born: Raimondo Melnati; 17 June 1897; Livorno, Italy
- Died: 30 March 1979 (aged 81); Rome, Italy
- Years active: 1921–1965

Umberto Melnati (17 June 1897 – 30 March 1979) was an Italian film actor.

He appeared in over 35 films between 1932 and 1962.

He starred in films such as the Mario Mattoli 1936 film L'uomo che sorride and Il signor Max (1937). He made many appearances alongside Vittorio De Sica when he was a younger actor.

== Selected filmography ==
- Il figlio (1921)
- Two Happy Hearts (1932) – Ing. Carlo Fabbri
- Everybody's Secretary (1933)
- The Song of the Sun (1934) – Bardelli
- La provincialina (1934)
- But It's Nothing Serious (1936) – Vico Lamanna
- Just Married (1936) – Renzo
- L'uomo che sorride (1936) – Dino
- The Countess of Parma (1937) – Carrani
- Il signor Max (1937) – Riccardo
- La mazurka di papà (1938) – Ambrogio Peretti
- I Want to Live with Letizia (1938) – Il finto Bebe
- The House of Shame (1938) – Massimo
- The Woman of Monte Carlo (1938) – Un banchiere
- A Thousand Lire a Month (1939) – Matteo
- Belle o brutte si sposan tutte... (1939) – Giorgio
- Un mare di guai (1939) – Clodomiro
- Two on a Vacation (1940) – Aroldo Bianchi
- Vento di milioni (1940) – Tom Browning
- Red Roses (1940) – Tommaso Savelli
- The Sinner (1940) – Paolo
- Con le donne non si scherza (1941) – Leone
- Barbablù (1941) – Arcibaldo Cansfield
- Thrill (1941) – Ugo Palffy
- Short Circuit (1943) – Ugo Redy, suo marito
- Without a Woman (1943) – Il duca Venanzio Navarra
- My Beautiful Daughter (1950) – 'Foto-romanzo', director
- Vivere a sbafo (1950) – Martino
- Woman of the Red Sea (1953) – Sebastiano Lama
- Martin Toccaferro (1953) – Conte Fiore
- La valigia dei sogni (1953) – Ettore Omeri
- Mid-Century Loves (1954) – The Onorevole a.k.a. Cocò (segment "Girandola 1910")
- Flesh and the Woman (1954)
- Appassionatamente (1954) – Notary Dupré
- Madame du Barry (1954) – Curtins
- Too Bad She's Bad (1954) – Michele, l'uomo derubato del portafogli
- Frou-Frou (1955) – Sigismond Meursault, le comte italien et protecteur
- The Golden Arrow (1962) – Low Genie
