= Germana Paolieri =

Italian actress (1906–1998)

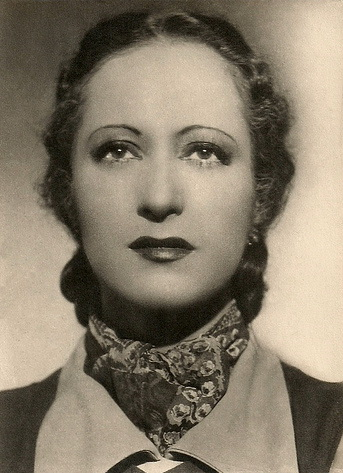
- Born: 29 August 1906; Florence, Kingdom of Italy
- Died: 8 August 1998 (aged 91); Montecatini, Pistoia, Italy
- Occupations: Film actress; television actress
- Years active: 1932–1981 (film & TV)

Germana Paolieri (29 August 1906 – 8 August 1998) was an Italian actress. During the 1930s she became a leading lady of Italian cinema appearing in major films such as the 1938 biopic Giuseppe Verdi.

== Selected filmography ==
- The Opera Singer (1932)
- The Gift of the Morning (1932)
- La Wally (1932)
- My Little One (1933)
- Lorenzino de' Medici (1935)
- Luciano Serra, Pilot (1938)
- Star of the Sea (1938)
- All of Life in One Night (1938)
- Giuseppe Verdi (1938)
- Madame Butterfly (1939)
- Kean (1940)
- Saint Maria (1942)
- The Two Orphans (1942)
- It Happened in Damascus (1943)
- Resurrection (1944)
- The Ten Commandments (1945)
- Hand of Death (1949)
- Cavalcade of Heroes (1950)
- Naples Sings (1953)
- It Happened in the Park (1953)
- The Island Monster (1954)
- It Takes Two to Sin in Love (1954)
- The Two Friends (1955)
- The Song of the Heart (1955)
- The Angel of the Alps (1957)
