= The House of Shame (1938 film) =

1938 film by Max Neufeld

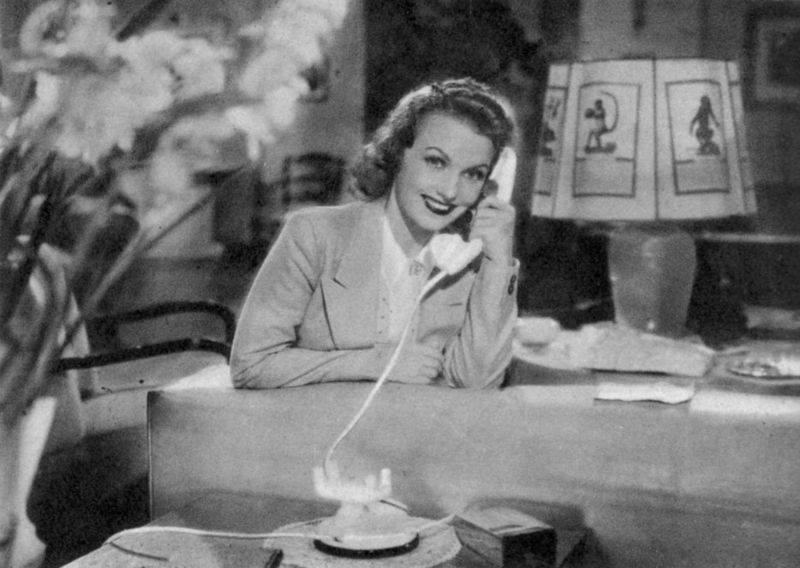
- Directed by: Max Neufeld
- Written by: Aldo De Benedetti
- Produced by: Giuseppe Amatos
- Starring: Amedeo Nazzari; Assia Noris; Alida Valli
- Cinematography: Ernst Mühlrad
- Edited by: Maria Rosada
- Music by: Cesare A. Bixio
- Production company: Amato Film
- Distributed by: Generalcine
- Release date: 14 December 1938
- Running time: 95 minutes
- Country: Italy
- Language: Italian

The House of Shame (Italian: La casa del peccato) is a 1938 Italian "white-telephones" comedy film directed by Max Neufeld and starring Amedeo Nazzari, Assia Noris and Alida Valli.

It was shot at the Cinecittà Studios in Rome. The film's sets were designed by the art director Gastone Medin. The film was the first time Nazzari and Valli co-starred together, as they would later go on to do a number of films.

== Synopsis ==
A wife, concerned that her husband does not love her, pretends to have another suitor in order to make him jealous. Getting wise to this, he in turn pretends to have a new girlfriend.

== Cast ==
- Amedeo Nazzari as Giulio
- Assia Noris as Renata
- Umberto Melnati as Massimo
- Alida Valli as La ragazza
- Giulio Stival as Un amico di Giulio
- Giuseppe Porelli as Il maggiordomo
- Aristide Baghetti
- Giuseppe Bordonaro
- Vasco Creti
- Corrado De Cenzo
- Jone Morino
- Tatiana Pavoni
- Teodoro Pescara Pateras
- Giuseppe Pierozzi
- Sandra Ravel

== Bibliography ==
- Nowell-Smith, Geoffrey & Hay, James & Volpi, Gianni. The Companion to Italian Cinema. Cassell, 1996.
