= Giuseppe Verdi (film) =

- Directed by: Carmine Gallone
- Written by: Carmine Gallone; Lucio D'Ambra
- Produced by: Carmine Gallone
- Starring: Fosco Giachetti; Gaby Morlay; Germana Paolieri; Camillo Pilotto
- Cinematography: Massimo Terzano
- Edited by: Oswald Hafenrichter
- Production company: Italia Film
- Distributed by: ENIC
- Release date: August 1938
- Running time: 110 minutes
- Country: Italy
- Language: Italian

Giuseppe Verdi is a 1938 Italian biographical film directed by Carmine Gallone and starring Fosco Giachetti, Gaby Morlay and Germana Paolieri. The film portrays the life of the composer Giuseppe Verdi (1813–1901). The casting of Giachetti as Verdi was intended to emphasise the composer's patriotism, as he had recently played patriotic roles in films such as The White Squadron. The film was made at the Cinecittà Studios in Rome. The film is also known by the alternative title The Life of Giuseppe Verdi.

== Main cast ==
- Fosco Giachetti as Giuseppe Verdi
- Gaby Morlay as Giuseppina Strepponi
- Germana Paolieri as Margherita Barezzi
- Camillo Pilotto as Antonio Barezzi
- Cesco Baseggio as il padre di Verdi
- Maria Jacobini as Luigia Uttini, madre di Verdi
- Maria Cebotari as Teresa Stolz
- Febo Mari as Merelli, il direttore della Scala di Milano
- Carlo Duse as Temistocle Solera
- Eugenio Duse as L'impresario Massini
- Enrico Glori as Il maestro Mariani
- Clara Padoa as La contessa Maffei
- Achille Majeroni as Il maestro Basili
- Carlo Tamberlani as Demalde
- Augusto Di Giovanni as Antonio Ghislanzoni
- Gustavo Serena as Salvadore Cammarano
- Guido Celano as Francesco Maria Piave
- Henri Rollan as Victor Hugo
- Lamberto Picasso as Gaetano Donizetti
- Gabriel Gabrio as Honoré de Balzac
- Pierre Brasseur as Alexandre Dumas fils

== Bibliography ==
- Landy, Marcia. The Folklore of Consensus: Theatricality in the Italian Cinema, 1930-1943. SUNY Press, 1998.
