= Assia Noris =

Russian-Italian actress (1912–1998)

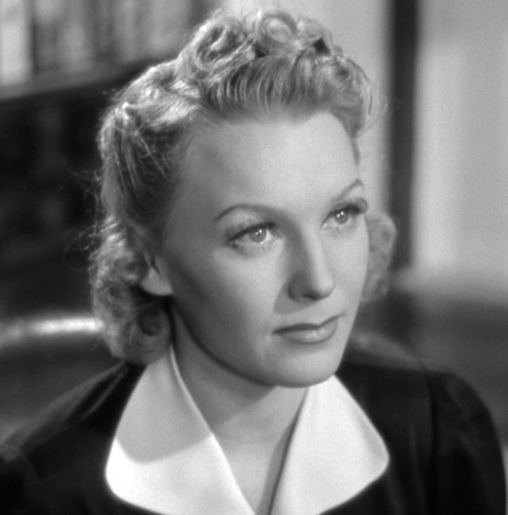
- Noris in Department Store (1939)
- Born: Anastasia Nikolaevna von Gerzfeld; 16 February 1912; Saint Petersburg, Russian Empire
- Died: 27 January 1998 (aged 85); Sanremo, Italy
- Years active: 1933–1965 (film)
- Spouses: Roberto Rossellini (m. 1934; ann. 1936) Mario Camerini (m. 1940; ann. 1943)

Anastasia Nikolaevna von Gerzfeld (Russian: Анастасия Николаевна Герцфельд, sometimes transliterated as Anastassia von Hertzfeld; 16 February 1912 – 27 January 1998), known professionally as Assia Noris, was a Russian-Italian film actress.

Born in Saint Petersburg, Russia, Noris appeared in over 35 films between 1932 and 1965, such as the Mario Mattoli 1936 film The Man Who Smiles. She also made several appearances alongside Vittorio De Sica when he was a young actor and took part in a number of films directed by her later husband Mario Camerini, including Il signor Max (1937). She was previously married to film director Roberto Rossellini.

== Selected filmography ==
- Three Lucky Fools (1933)
- Giallo (1933)
- The Wedding March (1934)
- Those Two (1935)
- But It's Nothing Serious (1936)
- The Man Who Smiles (1936)
- I'll Give a Million (1936)
- A Woman Between Two Worlds (1936)
- Il signor Max (1937)
- The Make Believe Pirates (1937)
- The House of Shame (1938)
- I Want to Live with Letizia (1938)
- Department Store (1939)
- Dora Nelson (1939)
- Heartbeat (1939)
- A Romantic Adventure (1940)
- One Hundred Thousand Dollars (1940)
- Honeymoon (1941)
- Love Story (1942)
- A Pistol Shot (1942)
- Strange Inheritance (1943)
- A Little Wife (1943)
- Captain Fracasse (1943)
- What a Distinguished Family (1945)
- The Ten Commandments (1945)
- Amina (1951)
- La Celestina P... R... (1965)

== Bibliography ==
- Gundle, Stephen. Mussolini's Dream Factory: Film Stardom in Fascist Italy. Berghahn Books, 2013.
