= The Last Enemy (film) =

- Directed by: Umberto Barbaro
- Written by: Fritz Eckhardt; Francesco Pasinetti; Umberto Barbaro
- Produced by: Antonio Piras
- Starring: Fosco Giachetti; María Denis; Guglielmo Sinaz; Gemma Bolognesi
- Cinematography: Mario Albertelli
- Edited by: Umberto Barbaro; Vincenzo Sorelli
- Music by: Emilio Tufacchi
- Production company: SCIA
- Release date: 1938
- Running time: 88 minutes
- Country: Italy
- Language: Italian

The Last Enemy (Italian: L'ultima nemica) is a 1938 Italian drama film directed by Umberto Barbaro and starring Fosco Giachetti, María Denis and Guglielmo Sinaz.

== Cast ==
- Fosco Giachetti as Franco Rossi
- María Denis as Anna Vitali
- Guglielmo Sinaz as Commendator Vitali, Anna's father
- Gemma Bolognesi as Signora Vitali, Anna's mother
- Carlo Lombardi as Doctor Vitali
- Giuliana Gianni as Elsa, woman doctor
- Alida Valli as A friend of Anna
- Mario Pisu as Ferdinando De Medio
- Elena Zareschi as Isa Fleur
- Otello Toso as Enzo
- Livia Minelli as A nurse
- Carlo Petrangeli as Giancarlo
- Giorgio Capecchi as Doro
- Oreste Fares as Prof. Mancini
- Tatiana Pavoni as A friend of Elsa
- Joop van Hulzen as Doctor

== Bibliography ==
- Ben-Ghiat, Ruth. Fascist Modernities: Italy, 1922-1945. University of California Press, 2001.
- Moliterno, Gino. The A to Z of Italian Cinema. Scarecrow Press, 2009.
