= Fosco Giachetti =

Italian actor (1900–1974)

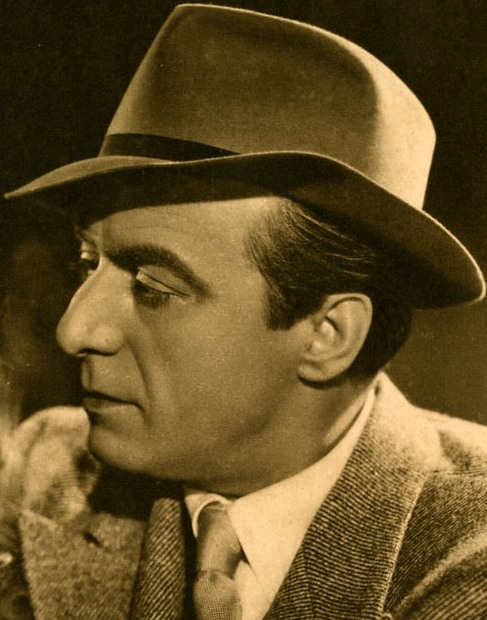
- Giachetti in 1942
- Born: 28 March 1900; Sesto Fiorentino, Italy
- Died: 22 December 1974 (aged 74); Rome, Italy
- Years active: 1934–1974

Fosco Giachetti (28 March 1900, in Sesto Fiorentino – 22 December 1974, in Rome) was an Italian actor.

Fosco Giachetti was the protagonist of Lo squadrone bianco (1936), directed by Augusto Genina. He became the leading man in Fascist propaganda films such as Tredici uomini e un cannone (1936), Sentinelle di bronzo (1937), Scipione l'Africano, Edgar Neville's Italian Carmen fra i rossi (1939), L'assedio dell'Alcazar (1940) and Bengasi (1942). In 1942, he also co-starred in Goffredo Alessandrini's two part Noi Vivi and Addio Kira!.

Un colpo di pistola (1942) by Renato Castellani and Fari nella nebbia (1942) by Gianni Franciolini were not as successful as his earlier films.

After the war, he returned to the stage. He worked in Spain with Edgar Neville in Nada and in Carne de horca. He had a supporting role in 1959 Dino Risi's successful comedy Il mattatore. In 1964, he appeared in an adaptation of A. J. Cronin's novel, The Citadel.

In 2003, the Galleria Fosco Giachetti in Sesto Fiorentino was opened in his honor.

== Filmography ==
Year	Title	Role	Notes
1933	The Missing Treaty	Giorgio Raytham	
1934	Dimmed Lights	Lord Spider	
1934	The Last of the Bergeracs	Il tenente	
1934	Creatures of the Night		Uncredited
1935	L'avvocato difensore		Uncredited
1936	Cuor di vagabondo	Giovanni	
1936	Luci sommerse	Lord Spider	
1936	Lo squadrone bianco	Il capitano Santelia	
1936	Tredici uomini e un cannone	Uomo #1	
1936	Fiordalisi d'oro	Conte Andrea di Beaulieu	
1937	Scipio Africanus	Captain Massinissa	
1937	Sentinels of Bronze	Capitano Negri	
1938	Giuseppe Verdi	Giuseppe Verdi	
1938	Pride	Alberto Celoria	
1938	The Woman of Monte Carlo	Giorgio Duclos	
1939	Naples Will Never Die	Mario Fusco	
1939	The Dream of Butterfly	Harry Peters	
1939	Hurricane in the Tropics	Il capitano Moraes	
1939	Carmen fra i rossi	Saverio	
1940	The Last Enemy	Franco Rossi	
1940	The Siege of the Alcazar	Captain Vela	
1940	The Sinner	Salvatore, fratello di Adele	
1940	Senza cielo	Mario Riccardi	
1940	The Daughter of the Green Pirate	Carlos de la Riva	
1941	Ridi pagliaccio	Pietro Rinaldi	
1941	Light in the Darkness	Alberto Serrani	
1941	Blood Wedding	Gidda	
1941	The Secret Lover	Giorgio Amholt	
1942	Headlights in the Fog	Cesare	
1942	A Pistol Shot	Andrea Anickoff	
1942	Bengasi	Il capitano Enrico Berti	
1942	We the Living	Andrei Taganov	
1942	Addio Kira!	Andrei Taganov	
1942	Yellow Hell	Francesco	
1942	Sealed Lips	Ruggero D'Anzi	
1943	A Living Statue	Paolo Vieri	
1943	A Little Wife	Giulio Nardi	
1945	L'abito nero da sposa	Giovanni de Medici	
1945	Fear No Evil	Benedetto	
1945	Life Begins Anew	Paolo Martini	
1946	Notte di tempesta	Domenico	
1947	The Damned	Garosi	
1947	The Other	Marco de Santis	
1947	Nada	Román Brunet	
1947	The Brothers Karamazov	Dimitri Karamazov	
1947	Four Women	Alberto Reyes, pintor	
1947	Farewell, My Beautiful Naples	Carlo Sanna	
1948	Crossroads of Passion	Toniani	
1948	Letter at Dawn	Carlo Marini	
1949	Romanticismo	Tito Ansperti	
1950	The Glass Castle	Laurent Bertal	
1951	The Counterfeiters	Ispettore Moroni	
1951	Four Red Roses	Antonio Berti	
1953	Condemned to Hang	Lucero	
1954	House of Ricordi	Giuseppe Verdi	
1956	The Virtuous Bigamist	Antonio	
1959	The Defeated Victor	Doctor boxing	
1960	Il Mattatore	General Mesci	
1960	The Conqueror of the Orient	Omar, Nadir's Father	
1961	The Wastrel	Captain Hugh Hardy	
1962	La monaca di Monza	Monsignor Barca	
1962	Taras Bulba, the Cossack	Voivode	
1962	The Fury of Achilles	Priamos	
1962	La notte dell'innominato		
1963	Jacob and Esau	Isaac	
1963	Giacobbe, l'uomo che lottò con Dio	Abramo – Abraham	
1965	Samba	João Fernandes de Oliveira	
1967	Another's Wife	Alberto	
1970	The Conformist	The Colonel	
1971	Scipio the African	Aulio Gellio	
1973	The Inheritor	Luigi Galazzi	

== Awards ==
- Venice Film Festival Best Actor for Bengasi, 1942
