= The Courier of Moncenisio (1916 film) =

- Directed by: Leopoldo Carlucci
- Written by: Jean Bouchardy (novel); Leopoldo Carlucci
- Starring: Achille Majeroni; Lina Millefleurs; Elda Bruni; Luigi Serventi; Bonaventura Ibáñez
- Cinematography: Ferdinando Martini
- Production company: Milano Films
- Distributed by: Milano Film
- Release date: June 1916
- Country: Italy
- Languages: Silent; Italian intertitles

The Courier of Moncenisio (Italian: Il vetturale del Moncenisio) is a 1916 Italian silent drama film directed by Leopoldo Carlucci and starring Achille Majeroni, Lina Millefleurs and Elda Bruni. It is the first of three film adaptations of the 1852 novel Jean le Coucher by Jean Bouchardy. It was made by the Milan-based Milano Films.

== Cast ==
- Achille Majeroni
- Lina Millefleurs
- Elda Bruni
- Luigi Serventi
- Tranquillo Bianco
- Agostino Borgato
- A. Cesari
- Bonaventura Ibáñez

== Bibliography ==
- Goble, Alan. The Complete Index to Literary Sources in Film. Walter de Gruyter, 1999.
