= The Woman of Monte Carlo =

1938 film

- Fosco Giachetti and Dita Parlo
- Directed by: André Berthomieu; Mario Soldati
- Written by: Renato Castellani; Jacques Constant; Toni Huppertz; Mario Soldati
- Starring: Dita Parlo; Fosco Giachetti; Jules Berry
- Cinematography: Marcel Franchi; Fred Langenfeld
- Edited by: Mario Bonotti
- Music by: Amedeo Escobar; Joe Hajos; Fred Spielman
- Production companies: Continentalcine; Franco London Films
- Distributed by: ENIC
- Release date: 1938
- Running time: 85 minutes
- Countries: Italy; France
- Language: Italian

The Woman of Monte Carlo (Italian: La signora di Montecarlo) is a 1938 Italian "white-telephones" drama film directed by André Berthomieu and Mario Soldati and starring Dita Parlo, Fosco Giachetti and Jules Berry. A separate French version Unknown of Monte Carlo was released the following year.

It was shot at the Tirrenia Studios in Tuscany.

== Cast ==
- Dita Parlo as Vera
- Fosco Giachetti as Giorgio Duclos
- Jules Berry as Il conte Messirian
- Claude Lehmann as Andrea Duclos
- Danilo Calamai as Il detective
- Cellio Bucchi
- Enrico Glori
- Umberto Melnati as Un banchiere
- Osvaldo Valenti

== Bibliography ==
- Gianni Amelio. Mario Soldati e il cinema. Donzelli Editore, 2009.
