= Oretta Fiume =

Italian actress

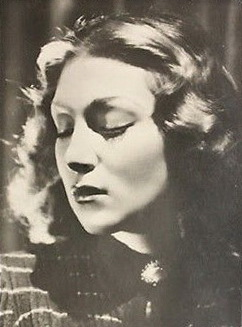
- Born: Claudia Scrobogna; 6 June 1919; Fiume, Kingdom of Italy (now Rijeka, Croatia)
- Died: 22 April 1994 (aged 74); Rome, Italy
- Occupation: Actress
- Years active: 1938–1965 (film)

Oretta Fiume (6 June 1919 – 22 April 1994) was an Italian actress who became a star during the Fascist era after winning a competition. One of her final screen roles was in La Dolce Vita (1960). She was born in Fiume (now Rijeka, Croatia) as Claudia Scrobogna and adopted her hometown as part of her stage name.

== Selected filmography ==
- The Cuckoo Clock (1938)
- Der singende Tor (1939)
- In the Country Fell a Star (1939)
- Backstage (1939)
- Fourth Page (1942)
- La Dolce Vita (1960)

== Bibliography ==
- Gundle, Stephen. Mussolini's Dream Factory: Film Stardom in Fascist Italy. Berghahn Books, 2013.
