= Paola Borboni =

Italian actress (1900–1995)

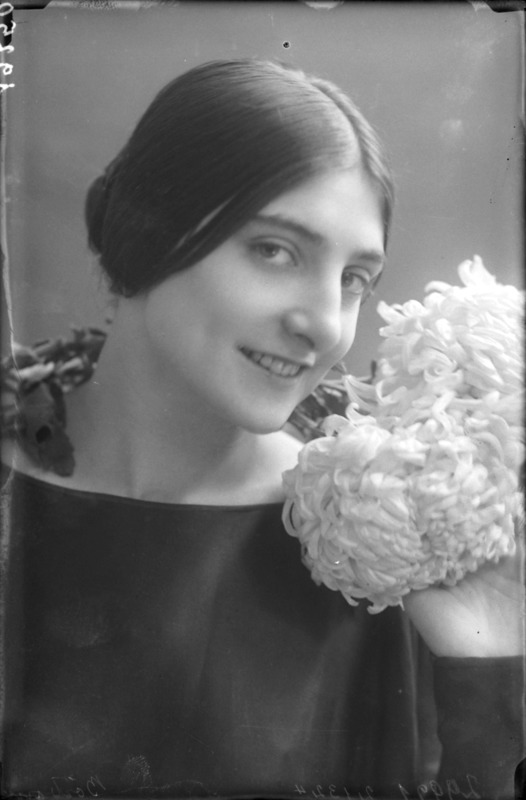
- Borboni in 1924
- Born: 1 January 1900; Golese, Parma, Kingdom of Italy
- Died: 9 April 1995 (aged 95); Bodio Lomnago, Varese, Italy
- Occupation: Actress
- Years active: 1916–1994

Paola Borboni (1 January 1900 – 9 April 1995) was an Italian stage and film actress whose career spanned nearly eight decades of cinema.

== Biography ==
Borboni was born on 1 January 1900 in Golese, a town presently included in the municipality of Parma, Italy. She made her stage debut in 1916, beginning to take minor film roles soon afterwards. She entered film in 1916 in the silent picture Jacobo Ortis directed by Giuseppe Sterni, and made over 80 film appearances between then and 1990.

Appearing in several silent films before 1921 she was absent from cinema for some 14 years during which time she made numerous stage appearances. She gained notoriety in 1925 when she appeared topless in a stage performance of Carlo Veneziani's Alga Marina as a mermaid, exposing her breasts. She returned to the silver screen in 1936 in the Mario Mattoli film L'Uomo che sorride.

She went on to appear in films such as the Carlo Lizzani-directed film Ai margini della metropoli in 1952 in which she appeared alongside the main cast of Massimo Girotti, Marina Berti and Giulietta Masina. Between 1936 and 1956 her career was at its peak and her roles gradually became less numerous in the decades that followed, making a final appearance in the Giorgio Mosa film Blue dolphin - l'avventura continua in 1990.

Borboni died of a stroke, aged 95, on 9 April 1995.

== Selected filmography ==
- Jacobo Ortis (1918)
- Il furto del sentimento (1919)
- Il bacio di un re (1919)
- Il principe idiota (1920)
- Gli artigli d'acciaio (1920)
- Sinfonia pastorale (1921)
- L'ora della morte (1921)
- The Amnesiac (1936) - Erminia Nardelli-Buzzi
- To Live (1936) - Emma
- L'uomo che sorride (1937) - La contessa
- Nina non far la stupida (1937, di Nunzio Malasomma) - Cate - la governante
- I've Lost My Husband! (1939, di Enrico Guazzoni) - Valentina
- Wealth Without a Future (1940, di Ferdinando Maria Poggioli) - Carolina Barra
- Il sogno di tutti (1940, di Oreste Biancoli) - La portinaia
- Giorno di nozze (1942, di Raffaello Matarazzo) - Elena - Amedeo's wife
- Il nemico (1943, di Guglielmo Giannini) - Clara Korsen
- Il birichino di papà (1943, di Raffaello Matarazzo) - La direttrice del collegio
- Annabella's Adventure (1943, di Leo Menardi) - La madre di Annabella
- La vita torna (1943, di Pier Luigi Faraldo) - La signora Lorini, madre di Elena
- Il viaggio del signor Perrichon (1943, di Paolo Moffa) - La signora Perrichon
- A Little Wife (1943, di Giorgio Bianchi)
- The Materassi Sisters (1944, di Ferdinando Maria Poggioli) - La principessa russa
- The Innkeeper (1944, di Luigi Chiarini) - Dejanira, l'attrice
- Finalmente sì (1944, di László Kish) - Zia Letizia
- Il ventesimo duca (1945, di Lucio De Caro) - La principessa di Danimarca
- La freccia nel fianco (1945, di Alberto Lattuada) - La baronessa Masiero
- La resa di Titì (1945, di Giorgio Bianchi)
- I'll Sing No More (1945, di Riccardo Freda) - L'impresaria teatrale Greta Arden
- The Models of Margutta (1946) - La moglie di Andrea
- Cavalcade of Heroes (1950, di Mario Costa) - La marchesa Ferrari
- E' più facile che un cammello.. (1950, di Luigi Zampa) - Luisa, la sorella di Carlo Bacchi
- Song of Spring (1951, di Mario Costa) - Lidia
- Rome 11:00 (1952, di Giuseppe De Santis) - Matilde
- Final Pardon (1952, di Renato Polselli)
- Lulù (1953, di Fernando Cerchio) - Virginia
- At the Edge of the City (1953, di Carlo Lizzani) - Madre di Luisa
- Roman Holiday (1953, di William Wyler) - Charwoman
- I Vitelloni (1953, di Federico Fellini) - Signora Rubini
- Gelosia (1953, di Pietro Germi) - La zia baronessa
- François il contrabbandiere (1953, di Gianfranco Parolini) - Pamela, la governante
- Mamma perdonami (1953, di Giuseppe Vari) - Madre di Luisa
- Siamo ricchi e poveri (1953, di Siro Marcellini)
- Il bacio dell'Aurora (1953)
- What Scoundrels Men Are! (1953, di Glauco Pellegrini) - madre di Bruno
- Condannatelo (1953, di Luigi Capuano)
- C'era una volta Angelo Musco (1953, di Giorgio Chili) - (archive footage)
- Amori di mezzo secolo (1954, di Glauco Pellegrini) - Countess Matilde Micheli (segment "L'amore romantico")
- Terza liceo (1954, di Luciano Emmer) - Madre di Bruno Sacchi
- Città canora (1954, di Mario Costa) - Anna
- Santarellina (1954, di Yves Allégret) - Rosa
- On Trial (1954, di Julien Duvivier) - Mme Bobika
- Knights of the Queen (1954, di Mauro Bolognini) - Maria Queen of France
- Red and Black (1954, di Domenico Paolella)
- Casta Diva (1954, di Carmine Gallone) - Signora Monti
- The Best Part (1955) - Bit part (uncredited)
- Mi permette babbo (1956, di Mario Bonnard) - Sonia d'Aragona
- L'oro di Roma (1961, di Carlo Lizzani) - Rosa
- I complessi (1965, di Franco Rossi) - Baracchi-Croce (segment "Il Complesso della Schiava nubiana")
- Menage all'italiana (1965, di Franco Indovina) - Carmelina's Mother
- La ragazzola (1965, di Giuseppe Orlandini) - Elvira
- Una vergine per il principe (1966, di Pasquale Festa Campanile) - La signora
- Arabella (1967, di Mauro Bolognini) - Duchess Moretti
- Colpo grosso alla napoletana (1968, di Ken Annakin) - Signora Rosa
- Quando le donne avevano la coda (1970, di Pasquale Festa Campanile) - Leader of Cavewoman Tribe
- All'ovest di Sacramento (1971, di Federico Chentrens) - Victoria
- Per grazia ricevuta (1971, di Nino Manfredi) - Immacolata
- The Beasts (1971, di Gianni Grimaldi) - Mother of fachiro (segment "Il fachiro")
- Sesso matto (1973, di Dino Risi) - Esperia / ('Non è mai troppo tardi')
- Bello cone un arcangelo (1974, di Alfredo Giannetti) - Donna Mercedes
- Paolo Barca maestro elementare praticamente nudista (1975, di Flavio Mogherini) - Nonna di Paolo
- Nerone (1977, di Pier Francesco Pingitore) - Agrippina
- L'albero della maldicenza (1979, di Giacinto Bonaquisti) - La Contessa
- Suor Omicidi (1979, di Giulio Berruti)
- Il vizietto 2 (1980, di Eduard Molinaro) - Mrs. Baldi
- The Lady of the Camellias (1981)
- Yes, Giorgio (1982, di Franklyn Schaffener) - Sister Theresa
- Cicciabomba (1982, di Umberto Lenzi) - Miris grandmother
- Più bello di così si muore (1982, di Pasquale Festa Campanile)
- Occhio, malocchio, prezzemolo e finocchio (1983, di Sergio Martino) - Marchesa del Querceto
- Amarsi un pò (1984, di Carlo Vanzina)
- Vacanze in America (1984, di Carlo Vanzina)
- Blue Dolphin (1990, di Giorgio Moser) - Nonna Giulia (final film role)
