= Fanny Sadowski =

Italian stage actress

Fanny Sadowski (c. 1826 –1906) was an Italian stage actress.

Sadowski managed her own theatre company from 1854, was the first female director from 1857, and the first female Impresario from 1870 in the Compagnia Reale at the Teatro dei Fiorentini in Naples.
