= The Cuckoo Clock (film) =

1938 film directed by Camillo Mastrocinque

- Directed by: Camillo Mastrocinque
- Written by: Alberto Donini (play); Renato Castellani; Mario Soldati
- Produced by: Romolo Laurenti
- Starring: Vittorio De Sica; Oretta Fiume; Laura Solari
- Cinematography: Piero Pupilli; Jack Stevens
- Edited by: Giorgio Simonelli
- Music by: Vittorio Rieti
- Production company: Era Film
- Distributed by: Metro-Goldwyn-Mayer
- Release date: 19 September 1938
- Running time: 90 minutes
- Country: Italy
- Language: Italian

The Cuckoo Clock (Italian: L'orologio a cucù) is a 1938 Italian historical mystery thriller film directed by Camillo Mastrocinque and starring Vittorio De Sica, Oretta Fiume and Laura Solari. It was shot at the Cinecittà Studios in Rome and on location in Livorno. The film's sets were designed by the art director Gino Brosio.

== Plot ==
At the time of Napoleon's escape from Elba, a wealthy banker from Livorno hides his gold in a cuckoo clock to protect it from seizure by revolutionaries.

== Cast ==
- Vittorio De Sica as Il capitano Ducci
- Oretta Fiume as Paolina
- Laura Solari as Elvira
- Lamberto Picasso as Il conte Scarabelli
- Ugo Ceseri as Barni, il fanatico bonapartista
- Gemma Bolognesi as La 'Nenna'
- Guglielmo Sinaz as Il banchiere Rosen
- Augusto Marcacci as Kreuss, l'ispettore di polizia
- Guglielmo Barnabò as Il sergente MacNeill
- Sergio Dani as Il lord ammiraglio
- Checco Rissone as Narciso
- Giuseppe Pierozzi as Tonino

== Bibliography ==
- Aprà, Adriano. The Fabulous Thirties: Italian Cinema 1929-1944. Electa International, 1979.
