= Lo squadrone bianco =

1936 Italian film

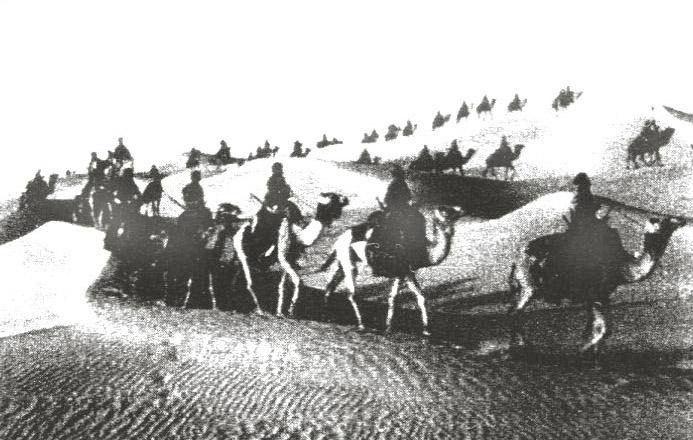
- Directed by: Augusto Genina
- Written by: Augusto Genina
- Starring: Fosco Giachetti; Antonio Centa; Fulvia Lanzi; Guido Celano
- Cinematography: Anchise Brizzi; Massimo Terzano
- Music by: Antonio Veretti
- Distributed by: Roma Film
- Release date: 1936
- Running time: 97 min
- Country: Italy
- Language: Italian

Lo squadrone bianco (Italian for "The White Squadron") is a 1936 Italian film directed by Augusto Genina. The plot features a cavalry lieutenant, unlucky in love, who redeems himself by battling the "rebels" of Tripolitania (modern Libya). The film won the Mussolini Cup at the Venice Film Festival, during the Second Italo-Abyssinian War.

== Plot ==
Cristiana (Fulvia Lanzi) is seen enjoying herself, dancing and drinking with other men. Lieutenant Mario Ludovici (Antonio Centa) races down a dark road and calls Cristiana from a payphone with a sense of urgency. When she does not answer, he proceeds to her apartment and angrily pounds on the door and rings the bell. He demands a traditional relationship, and leaves when she refuses but tries to seduce him.

Mario transfers to a desert fort in Tripolitania, where he replaces a heroic lieutenant who has recently perished in combat against the rebellious natives. Captain Santelia (Fosco Giachetti) distrusts Mario at first as a cowardly playboy. However, after the rebels steal some animals, the two pursue them with a squadron of camel-riding native troops allied to the Italians on a long and panoramic desert trek. Mario becomes ill, but eventually the two officers come to a mutual understanding and Mario disposes of a cigarette case from Cristiana and stops reminiscing of their luxurious memories.

Having caught up to the rebels at an oasis, a battle ensues; the rebels are defeated but the captain is killed. Meanwhile, Cristiana and a group of other tourists have arrived at the fort. A reconnaissance plane brings news to the fort of the battle and a dead officer, without knowing which officer has perished. This causes Cristiana an anxious night of waiting. The following day Lieutenant Ludovici returns, now in command of the squadron, and elects to remain in Tripolitania. As Cristiana prepares to leave with the tourist group, Mario bids her a final goodbye.

== Production ==
The film is based on the novel L'Escadron blanc by French writer Joseph Peyré, who had a hand in the adaptation of the script to the screen. It was shot at the Cines Studios in Rome.

Genina's noted shots of the Tripolitanian desert were all done on location. For its use of foreign technologies, it has been called the "first sample of the Americanised technical powers of Italy's huge new cinema city."

== Reception ==
Writing for Night and Day in 1937, Graham Greene gave the film a good review, characterizing it as "odd and refreshing" for a "superficially melodramatic film". Greene claims that the film is "a very slow picture", but that in time the audience comes to recognize that "slowness is a value", and he describes the photography as "unsensational and memorable". Greene also praises the acting of Fulviá Lanzi.

A reviewer from the British Union of Fascists raved that the film "has all the enduring greatness of simplicity. There is no affection, only a plain recounting of Man's eternal battle with Nature."

== Analysis ==
Traditionally, the film is divided into three narrative segments in the theme of the Fascist male conversion: "the bourgeois prologue, the colonialist segment, and the epilogue."

Lo squadrone bianco has been interpreted as an "exemplary film" of the Fascism reinterpretation of pre-Fascist historical narratives for contemporary purposes, i.e. "expansionist propaganda." Others consider it first and foremost an Italian neorealist film, only indirectly nationalistic through its use of patriotic themes.

As in other Fascist colonial films like Il cammino degli eroi, the native "rebels" are portrayed as well-armed with European weapons. The film plays down the overwhelming disparities between the Italian and Tripolitanian forces, omitting for example the offensive use of aircraft (in addition to reconnaissance) and the use of gas warfare by the Italians.

Other analyses of the film draw on Gustave Le Bon's theory of crowds (i.e. the native Tripolitanians) and space (i.e. the desert) as "two interconnected phenomena," noting that the natives themselves are "virtually absent from the screen."

Genina was temporarily banned from Italian studios for his work on such imperialist war films, but continued to find work after 1945, in a climate where nearly all Italian filmmakers had collaborated to some degree with the regime.

== See also ==
- History of Libya as Italian Colony
