= Pride (1938 film) =

1938 film

- Directed by: Marco Elter
- Written by: Leo Bomba; Mino Doletti; Silvio Maurano
- Produced by: Silvio Maurano
- Starring: Fosco Giachetti; Paola Barbara; Mario Ferrari
- Cinematography: Carlo Montuori
- Edited by: Baccio Bandini; Marco Elter
- Music by: Alexandre Derevitsky; Antonio Veretti
- Production company: SALIC
- Distributed by: Generalcine
- Release date: September 1938
- Running time: 70 minutes
- Country: Italy
- Language: Italian

Pride (Italian: Orgoglio) is a 1938 Italian drama film directed by Marco Elter and starring Fosco Giachetti, Paola Barbara and Mario Ferrari.

It was shot at the Cinecittà Studios in Rome. The film's sets were designed by the art director Giorgio Pinzauti.

== Synopsis ==
A young Engineer with ambitious plans tries and fails to get support from his traditionalist industrialist father. Only when his son is injured in an unsuccessful experiment does the father change his mind.

== Cast ==
- Fosco Giachetti as Alberto Celoria
- Paola Barbara as Gianna
- Mario Ferrari as Il banchiere castoldi
- Achille Majeroni as Il padre di alberto
- Hesperia
- Nada Fiorelli
- Mario Besesti
- Carlo Duse
- Adolfo Geri

== Bibliography ==
- Poppi, Roberto. I registi: dal 1930 ai giorni nostri. Gremese Editore, 2000.
