= Laura Solari =

Italian actress (1913–1984)

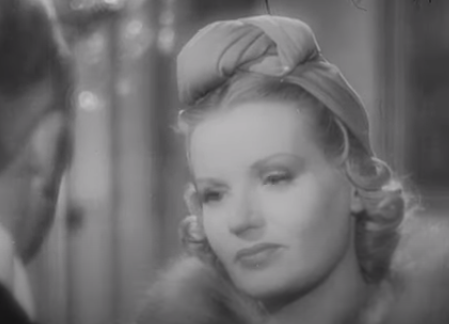
- Solari in L'orizzonte dipinto (1941)
- Born: Laura Camaur; 5 January 1913; Trieste, Austria-Hungary
- Died: 13 September 1984 (aged 71); Bellinzona, Ticino, Switzerland
- Occupation: Actress
- Years active: 1936–1969
- Spouse(s): Oscar Szemere (1930–1940); Arthur Roper Caldbeck
- Children: 3

Laura Solari (née Camaur; 5 January 1913 – 13 September 1984) was an Italian film actress.

== Early and personal life ==
Laura Camaur was born on 5 January 1913, in Trieste, then part of Austria-Hungary. She was the daughter of sculptor and artist Antonio Camaur (1875-1919) and his wife, Maria Taucer. In addition to being prominent in Triestine art and intellectual circles, Antonio Camaur was a prominent Irredentist and advocated annexation of Trieste by Italy.

In late 1915, Camaur went into exile because of his pro-Italian sympathies, and Laura lived in Northern Italy until her family's return to Trieste in 1919.

After World War I, Laura Camaur came under the tutelage of the Taucer family who sent her to be educated in Vienna. In 1930, she married an older Hungarian army officer, Oscar Szemere, but the couple separated after his business failed. They were divorced in Reno, Nevada, in 1940. Camaur later married Arthur Roper Caldbeck, a colonel in the British Army.

== Film career ==
Camaur was spotted by a talent scout, who was taken by her beauty, at a function at the La Scala theater in Milan. She was recruited as a motion picture actress by the fledgling Italian film industry and acquired the stage name "Laura Solari". Beginning with Regina della Scala in 1936 (released in 1937), she appeared in 30 films between 1936 and 1969. Solari participated in the legitimate stage in Trieste's Nuovo Teatro. She also appeared on television in programs such as the 1955 drama television series Police Call.

Solari retired in 1969 and moved to Switzerland. She died in Bellinzona, Ticino, Switzerland on 13 September 1984, survived by three sons.

== Partial filmography ==
- Queen of the Scala (1937)
- Il destino in tasca (1938)
- The Cuckoo Clock (1938) - Elvira
- La sposa dei re (1938) - Giulia Clary
- No Man's Land (1939) - Grazia
- A Wife in Danger (1939) - Michelina, la camiera
- Bionda sotto chiave (1939) - Aurora, la telefonista
- We Were Seven Widows (1939) - Anna Calcini
- Una lampada alla finestra (1940) - Vianella
- Validità giorni dieci (1940) - Clara Naldieri
- Don Pasquale (1940) - Norina
- L'orizzonte dipinto (1941) - La moglie dell'attore moderno
- Ridi pagliaccio (1941) - Anna Alessandri
- Everything for Gloria (1941) - Regine Möbius
- The Thing About Styx (1942) - Julia Sander
- The Red Terror (1942) - Olga Feodorowna
- Luisa Sanfelice (1942) - Luisa Sanfelice
- A Living Statue (1943) - Luisa / Rita
- La maschera e il volto (1943) - Savina
- Il matrimonio segreto (1943)
- Il vento m'ha cantato una canzone (1947) - Laura
- Without a Flag (1951)
- The World Condemns Them (1953) - Signora Balestra
- Roman Holiday (1953) - Hennessy's Secretary
- Vacanze alla baia d'argento (1961) - Lia Moriconi
- The Return of Doctor Mabuse (1961) - Mrs. Pizarro
- Romulus and Remus (1961) - Rea Silvia
- The Corsican Brothers (1961) - Luisa Dupont
- Bandits in Milan (1968) - Tuccio's Mother
- Revenge (1969) - Mrs. Killenberg (final film role)
