= Galliano Masini =

Italian opera singer

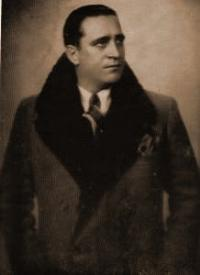
Galliano Masini

Galliano Masini (7 February 1896 – 15 February 1986) was a leading Italian operatic tenor, particularly associated with the spinto (lyric-dramatic) roles of the Italian repertory.

Masini was born in Livorno in humble circumstances. He studied singing in Milan. Some sources say that his teacher was Angelo Bendinelli, while others suggest another teacher, Giovanni Laura. He made his debut in his native Livorno, as Cavaradossi in Giacomo Puccini's Tosca in 1923.

He sang as first tenor at the Rome Opera from 1930 to 1950, and was also a regular guest artist at La Scala, Milan, and the Verona Arena. Outside Italy, he appeared at the Paris Opéra, the Lyric Opera of Chicago (1937–38), the Metropolitan Opera in New York (1938–39), and the Teatro Colón in Buenos Aires (various years).

Masini was particularly acclaimed in roles such as Alvaro, Radames, Loris and Calaf, although he also enjoyed success in more lyrical parts, notably as Edgardo, Rodolfo and Pinkerton.

He died in Livorno at the age of 90.

Masini was not regarded by music critics as being a particularly subtle stylist as a singer; but the impressive quality of his vocal instrument was unquestioned. His large, ardent and ringing voice can be heard to best advantage in a complete recording of Verdi's La forza del destino, under the baton of Gino Marinuzzi, that was made by Cetra Records in 1941. This was the first ever complete recording of this work. Masini also made a number of recordings of individual opera arias. These date from 1929 through until the late 1940s. Many of them have been reissued in recent years on CD.
