= Achille Majeroni (actor, born 1881) =

Italian actor (1881–1964)

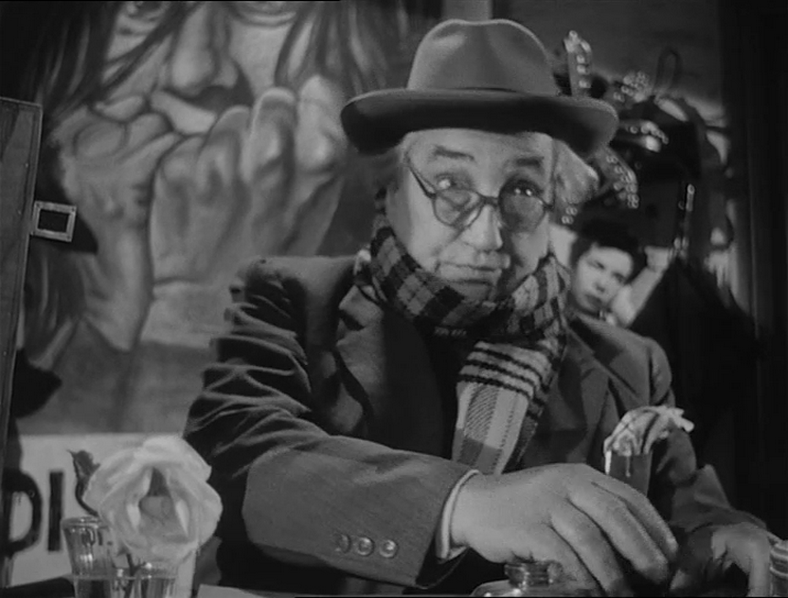
- Majeroni in Il viale della speranza (1953)
- Born: 24 August 1881; Siracusa, Italy
- Died: 12 October 1964 (aged 83); Rome, Italy
- Occupation: Actor
- Years active: 1913–1964

Achille Majeroni (24 August 1881 – 12 October 1964) was an Italian film actor.

Born in Syracuse, Sicily, son of Achille Majeroni and his second wife Graziosa Bignetti, he made his stage debut at age twelve with the Marazzi-Diligenti company. He later formed his own company, specializing in Shakespearean works. He appeared in 73 films between 1913 and 1964, notably Fellini's I Vitelloni, in which he played an old comedian.

He died in Rome.

== Selected filmography ==
- The Courier of Moncenisio (1916)
- Figaro and His Great Day (1931)
- La Wally (1932)
- The Last of the Bergeracs (1934)
- Everybody's Woman (1934)
- Loyalty of Love (1934)
- Like the Leaves (1935)
- The Joker King (1935)
- La damigella di Bard (1936)
- Music in the Square (1936)
- The Ambassador (1936)
- The Former Mattia Pascal (1937)
- Doctor Antonio (1937)
- Giuseppe Verdi (1938)
- Pride (1938)
- At Your Orders, Madame (1939)
- The Dream of Butterfly (1939)
- Backstage (1939)
- The Night of Tricks (1939)
- The First Woman Who Passes (1940)
- The Secret of Villa Paradiso (1940)
- Blood Wedding (1941)
- Caravaggio (1941)
- The Mask of Cesare Borgia (1941)
- The Hero of Venice (1941)
- Nothing New Tonight (1942)
- A Garibaldian in the Convent (1942)
- The Gorgon (1942)
- Luisa Sanfelice (1942)
- Lively Teresa (1943)
- Cab Number 13 (1948)
- Mad About Opera (1948)
- Cavalcade of Heroes (1950)
- Messalina (1951)
- I Vitelloni (1953)
- Il viale della speranza (1953)
- The Three Thieves (1954)
- The Conjugal Bed (1963)
- The Ape Woman (1964)
