= List of Italian films of 1934 =

A list of films produced in Italy under Fascist rule in 1934 (see 1934 in film):

Title	Director	Cast	Genre	Notes
1934
1860	Alessandro Blasetti	Gianfranco Giachetti, Mario Ferrari	Historical	
Apoteosi				
Aurora sul mare	Giorgio Simonelli	Renzo Ricci, Paolo Stoppa	Drama	
L' Avvocato difensore	Gero Zambuto	Gero Zambuto, Letizia Bonini	Comedy	
The Blind Woman of Sorrento	Nunzio Malasomma	Dria Paola, Corrado Racca	Drama	
The Canal of the Angels	Francesco Pasinetti	Maurizio D'Ancora, Anna Ariani	Drama	
Cardinal Lambertini	Parsifal Bassi	Ermete Zacconi, Isa Miranda, Giulietta De Riso	Comedy	
Creatures of the Night	Amleto Palermi	Tatyana Pavlova, Isa Pola, María Denis	Drama	
Dimmed Lights	Adelqui Migliar	Fosco Giachetti, Nelly Corradi, Laura Nucci	Drama	
Full Speed	Mario Mattoli	Vittorio De Sica, Milly, Anna Magnani	Comedy	
Everybody's Woman	Max Ophüls	Isa Miranda, Memo Benassi, Tatyana Pavlova, Federico Benfer	Drama	The only Italian film Ophüls made on his exile. Venice Award
Just Married	Guido Brignone	Umberto Melnati, Leda Gloria, Ugo Ceseri	Comedy	
Lady of Paradise	Enrico Guazzoni	Elsa De Giorgi, Mino Doro, Memo Benassi	Comedy	
The Last of the Bergeracs	Gennaro Righelli	Arturo Falconi, Italia Almirante-Manzini, Fosco Giachetti	Comedy	
The Little Schoolmistress	Guido Brignone	Andreina Pagnani, Renato Cialente, Egisto Olivieri	Drama	
Loyalty of Love	Guido Brignone	Marta Abba, Nerio Bernardi, Luigi Cimara	Historical	
The Matchmaker	Amleto Palermi	Angelo Musco, Rosina Anselmi	Comedy	
Mr. Desire	Gennaro Righelli	Vittorio De Sica, Dria Paola	Comedy	
Odette	Jacques Houssin	Francesca Bertini, Samson Fainsilber	Drama	
The Old Guard	Alessandro Blasetti	Gianfranco Giachetti, Mino Doro	Drama	
Port	Amleto Palermi	Irma Gramatica, Camillo Pilotto	Drama	
Seconda B	Goffredo Alessandrini	Sergio Tofano, Dina Perbellini, María Denis	Comedy	
The Song of the Sun	Max Neufeld	Vittorio De Sica, Giacomo Lauri Volpi	Comedy	Co-produced with Germany
Unripe Fruit	Carlo Ludovico Bragaglia	Nino Besozzi, Ugo Ceseri	Comedy	
Villafranca	Giovacchino Forzano	Corrado Racca, Annibale Betrone; Enzo Biliotti	Historical	
The Wedding March	Mario Bonnard	Tullio Carminati, Cesare Bettarini, Assia Noris	Comedy	

== See also ==
- List of Italian films of 1933
- List of Italian films of 1935
