= List of Italian films of 1937 =

A list of films produced in Italy under Fascist rule in 1937 (see 1937 in film):

Title	Director	Cast	Genre	Notes
1937
Abandon All Hope	Gennaro Righelli	Antonio Gandusio, María Denis	Comedy	
The Black Corsair	Amleto Palermi	Ciro Verratti, Silvana Jachino	Adventure	
The Carnival Is Here Again	Raffaello Matarazzo	Armando Falconi, Clara Tabody	Comedy	
The Castiglioni Brothers	Corrado D'Errico	Camillo Pilotto, Ugo Ceseri	Comedy	
Condottieri	Luis Trenker	Luis Trenker, Loris Gizzi	Historical	
The Countess of Parma	Alessandro Blasetti	Elisa Cegani, Antonio Centa, María Denis	Comedy	
Doctor Antonio	Enrico Guazzoni	Ennio Cerlesi, Lamberto Picasso	Historical	
Felicita Colombo	Mario Mattoli	Dina Galli, Armando Falconi	Comedy	
The Ferocious Saladin	Mario Bonnard	Angelo Musco, Alida Valli	Comedy	
The Former Mattia Pascal	Pierre Chenal	Pierre Blanchar, Isa Miranda	Drama	Co-production with France
Hands Off Me!	Gero Zambuto	Toto, Oreste Bilancia	Comedy	
I've Lost My Husband!	Enrico Guazzoni	Paola Borboni, Nino Besozzi	Comedy	
Il signor Max	Mario Camerini	Vittorio De Sica, Assia Noris, Rubi D'Alma	Comedy	Remade in 1957 and 1991 as Il conte Max
It Was I!	Raffaello Matarazzo	Eduardo De Filippo, Peppino De Filippo, Isa Pola, Alida Valli	Comedy	
The Last Days of Pompeo	Mario Mattoli	Enrico Viarisio, Camillo Pilotto	Comedy	
The Make Believe Pirates	Marco Elter	Assia Noris, Mino Doro	Comedy	
Marcella	Guido Brignone	Emma Gramatica, Caterina Boratto, Antonio Centa	Drama	
Mother Song	Carmine Gallone	Beniamino Gigli, Maria Cebotari, Hans Moser	Musical drama	Co-production with Germany
Queen of the Scala	Camillo Mastrocinque, Guido Salvini	Margherita Carosio, Giuseppe Addobbati	Drama	
Scipio Africanus	Carmine Gallone	Annibale Ninchi, Camillo Pilotto, Isa Miranda, Memo Benassi, Fosco Giachetti	Sword and sandal	Remade in 1971 Scipione, detto anche
Sentinels of Bronze	Romolo Marcellini	Fosco Giachetti, Giovanni Grasso	War	
These Children	Mario Mattoli	Vittorio De Sica, Paola Barbara, Giuditta Rissone	Comedy	
To Live	Guido Brignone	Tito Schipa, Caterina Boratto	Musical	
The Three Wishes	Kurt Gerron	Luisa Ferida, Antonio Centa, Leda Gloria	Comedy	
Tomb of the Angels	Carlo Ludovico Bragaglia	Amedeo Nazzari, Luisa Ferida, Vinicio Sofia	Drama	
The Two Misanthropists	Amleto Palermi	Camillo Pilotto, María Denis, Nino Besozzi	Comedy	

== See also ==
- List of Italian films of 1936
- List of Italian films of 1938
