= List of Italian films of 1936 =

A list of films produced in Italy under Fascist rule in 1936 (see 1936 in film):

== A-Z ==
Title	Director	Cast	Genre	Notes
Adam's Tree	Mario Bonnard	Elsa Merlini, Antonio Gandusio, Dria Paola	Comedy	
The Ambassador	Baldassarre Negroni	Luisa Ferida, Leda Gloria, Achille Majeroni	Comedy	
The Amnesiac	Gennaro Righelli	Angelo Musco, Checco Durante, Luisa Ferida	Comedy	
Amore				
The Ancestor	Guido Brignone	Antonio Gandusio, Paola Barbara, Mercedes Brignone	Comedy	
The Anonymous Roylott	Raffaello Matarazzo	Camillo Pilotto, Isa Pola, Giulio Donadio	Thriller	
Bayonet	Ferdinando Maria Poggioli	Nerio Bernardi, Leda Gloria, Mimì Aylmer	Historical	
Beggar's Wedding	Guido Brignone	Maurizio D'Ancora, Leda Gloria, Luigi Almirante	Comedy	
But It's Nothing Serious	Mario Camerini	Vittorio De Sica, Elisa Cegani, Assia Noris	Comedy	
Cavalry	Goffredo Alessandrini	Amedeo Nazzari, Elisa Cegani, Mario Ferrari	Drama	
The Dance of Time	Mario Baffico	Marcello Spada, Ugo Ceseri, Laura Nucci	Comedy	
La Damigella di Bard	Mario Mattoli	Emma Gramatica, Luigi Cimara, Cesare Bettarini	Drama	
The Four Musketeers	Carlo Campogalliani		Adventure	
God's Will Be Done	Amleto Palermi	Angelo Musco, María Denis, Sarah Ferrati	Comedy	
The Great Appeal	Mario Camerini	Camillo Pilotto, Roberto Villa, Guglielmo Sinaz	War	
I Don't Know You Anymore	Nunzio Malasomma	Vittorio De Sica, Elsa Merlini, Enrico Viarisio	Comedy	
Joe the Red	Raffaello Matarazzo	Armando Falconi, Luisa Garella, María Denis	Comedy	
King of Diamonds	Enrico Guazzoni	Angelo Musco, Rosina Anselmi, Vanna Vanni	Comedy	
Lohengrin	Nunzio Malasomma	Vittorio De Sica, Mimi Aylmer, Giuditta Rissone	Comedy	
The Man Who Smiles	Mario Mattoli	Vittorio De Sica, Assia Noris, Enrico Viarisio	Comedy	
Music in the Square	Mario Mattoli	Enrico Viarisio, Milly, Ugo Ceseri	Comedy	
The Phantom Gondola	Augusto Genina	Marcelle Chantal, Henri Rollan, Paul Bernard	Drama	Co-production with France
Sette giorni all'altro mondo	Mario Mattoli	Armando Falconi, Mimi Aylmer, Enrico Viarisio	Comedy	
Lo squadrone bianco	Augusto Genina	Antonio Centa, Fosco Giachetti, Olinto Cristina	Drama	Fascist propaganda. Best Italian Film, Venice Film Festival
Thirty Seconds of Love	Mario Bonnard	Nino Besozzi, Elsa Merlini, Anna Magnani	Comedy	
The Two Sergeants	Enrico Guazzoni	Gino Cervi, Mino Doro, Luisa Ferida	Drama	
White Amazons	Gennaro Righelli	Luisa Ferida, Luisa Ferida, Doris Duranti	Comedy	
A Woman Between Two Worlds	Goffredo Alessandrini	Isa Miranda, Assia Noris, Giulio Donadio	Drama	

== See also ==
- List of Italian films of 1935
- List of Italian films of 1937
