= List of Italian films of 1933 =

A list of films produced in Italy in 1933 (see 1933 in film):

== A-Z ==
Title	Director	Cast	Genre	Notes
Acqua cheta				
Bad Subject	Carlo Ludovico Bragaglia	Vittorio De Sica, Laura Nucci	Comedy	
Country Air	Eugenio de Liguoro	Erminio Macario, Laura Adani	Comedy	
Everybody's Secretary	Amleto Palermi	Vittorio De Sica, Giuditta Rissone	Comedy	
Fanny	Mario Almirante	Dria Paola, Mino Doro, Lamberto Picasso	Comedy	
Giallo	Mario Camerini	Assia Noris, Sandro Ruffini, Elio Steiner	Thriller	
The Haller Case	Alessandro Blasetti	Marta Abba, Memo Benassi	Thriller	
I'll Always Love You	Mario Camerini	Elsa De Giorgi, Nino Besozzi, Mino Doro	Drama	
The Lucky Diamond	Carl Boese	Elsa Merlini, Vittorio De Sica	Comedy	
The Missing Treaty	Mario Bonnard	Ernesto Sabbatini, Leda Gloria, Mino Doro	Mystery	
Model Wanted	E.W. Emo	Elsa Merlini, Nino Besozzi	Comedy	
My Little One	Eugenio de Liguoro	Germana Paolieri, Ernesto Sabbatini	Drama	
Nini Falpala	Amleto Palermi	Dina Galli, Renzo Ricci, Elsa De Giorgi	Comedy	
Paprika	Carl Boese	Vittorio De Sica, Renato Cialente	Comedy	
Steel	Walter Ruttmann	Piero Pastore, Isa Pola	Drama	
Three Lucky Fools	Mario Bonnard	Tito Schipa, Eduardo De Filippo	Comedy	
Together in the Dark	Gennaro Righelli	Maurizio D'Ancora, Lamberto Picasso	Comedy	
Tourist Train	Raffaello Matarazzo	Marcello Spada, Lina Gennari	Comedy	

== See also ==
- List of Italian films of 1932
- List of Italian films of 1934
