= List of Italian films of 1935 =

A list of films produced in Italy under Fascist rule in 1935 (see 1935 in film):

| Title | Director | Cast | Genre | Notes |
|---|---|---|---|---|
1935
| L' Albergo della felicità | | | | |
| Aldebaran | Alessandro Blasetti | Gino Cervi, Evi Maltagliati | Drama | |
| Campo di maggio | | | | |
| Casta Diva | Carmine Gallone | Marta Eggerth, Lamberto Picasso, Gualtiero Tumiati | Musical | |
| Don Bosco | Goffredo Alessandrini | Gianpaolo Rosmino, Maria Vincenza | Drama | |
| Ginevra degli Almieri | Guido Brignone | Elsa Merlini, Amedeo Nazzari | Historical | |
| Golden Arrow | Piero Ballerini, Corrado D'Errico | Luisa Ferida, Guido Barbarisi, Laura Nucci | Crime | |
| I Love You Only | Mario Mattoli | Milly, Vittorio De Sica | Historical comedy | |
| I'll Give a Million | Mario Camerini | Vittorio De Sica, Cesare Zavattini | Comedy | |
| The Joker King | Enrico Guazzoni | Luisa Ferida, Armando Falconi | Comedy | |
| Like the Leaves | Mario Camerini | Isa Miranda, Mimì Aylmer | Drama | |
| Naples in Green and Blue | Armando Fizzarotti | Lina Gennari, Armando Gill | Musical | |
| Red Passport | Guido Brignone | Isa Miranda, Filippo Scelzo, Ugo Ceseri | Drama | Fascist propaganda |
| Territorial Militia | Mario Bonnard | Antonio Gandusio, Rosina Anselmi, Leda Gloria | Comedy | |
| Those Two | Gennaro Righelli | Eduardo De Filippo, Peppino De Filippo | Comedy | |
| The Three-Cornered Hat | Mario Camerini | Eduardo De Filippo, Peppino De Filippo, Leda Gloria | Comedy | |

== See also ==
- List of Italian films of 1934
- List of Italian films of 1936
