= Ferronetti =

Ferronetti is an Italian surname. Notable people with the surname include:

- Damiano Ferronetti (born 1984), Italian footballer
- Ignazio Ferronetti (1908–?), Italian film editor and director
