= Cesare Zoppetti =

Italian actor

- Zoppetti in What Scoundrels Men Are! (1932)
- Born: 1 January 1876; Genoa, Liguria; Italy
- Died: 15 March 1940 (aged 64); Rome, Lazio; Italy
- Occupation: Actor
- Years active: 1930–1940 (film)

Cesare Zoppetti (1 January 1876 – 15 March 1940) was an Italian stage and film actor. Zoppetti was a prolific film actor of the 1930s, appearing in nearly fifty productions between 1930 and his death in 1940 including the comedy What Scoundrels Men Are! (1932).

== Selected filmography ==
- The Private Secretary (1931)
- Television (1931)
- What Scoundrels Men Are! (1932).
- The Table of the Poor (1932)
- Your Money or Your Life (1932)
- The Blue Fleet (1932)
- The Gift of the Morning (1932)
- The Last Adventure (1932)
- Tourist Train (1933)
- Seconda B (1934)
- The Little Schoolmistress (1934)
- The Old Guard (1934)
- 1860 (1934)
- Mr. Desire (1934)
- The Wedding March (1934)
- Three Cornered Hat (1935)
- The Wedding March (1936)
- I'll Give a Million (1936)
- Bayonet (1936)
- Lohengrin (1936)
- Joe the Red (1936)
- The Dance of Time (1936)
- The Ambassador (1936)
- The Former Mattia Pascal (1937)
- Departure (1938)
- Princess Tarakanova (1938)
- Tonight at Eleven (1938)
- The Widow (1939)
- Backstage (1939)
- Who Are You? (1939)
- The Fornaretto of Venice (1939)
- The Count of Brechard (1940)

== Bibliography ==
- Landy, Marcia. The Folklore of Consensus: Theatricality in the Italian Cinema, 1930-1943. SUNY Press, 1998.
