= Oggi sposi =

Oggi sposi may refer to:

- Just Married (1934 film), an Italian comedy film
- Oggi sposi (1952 film)
- Oggi sposi (2009 film)
