= Calisto Bertramo =

Italian actor (1875–1941)

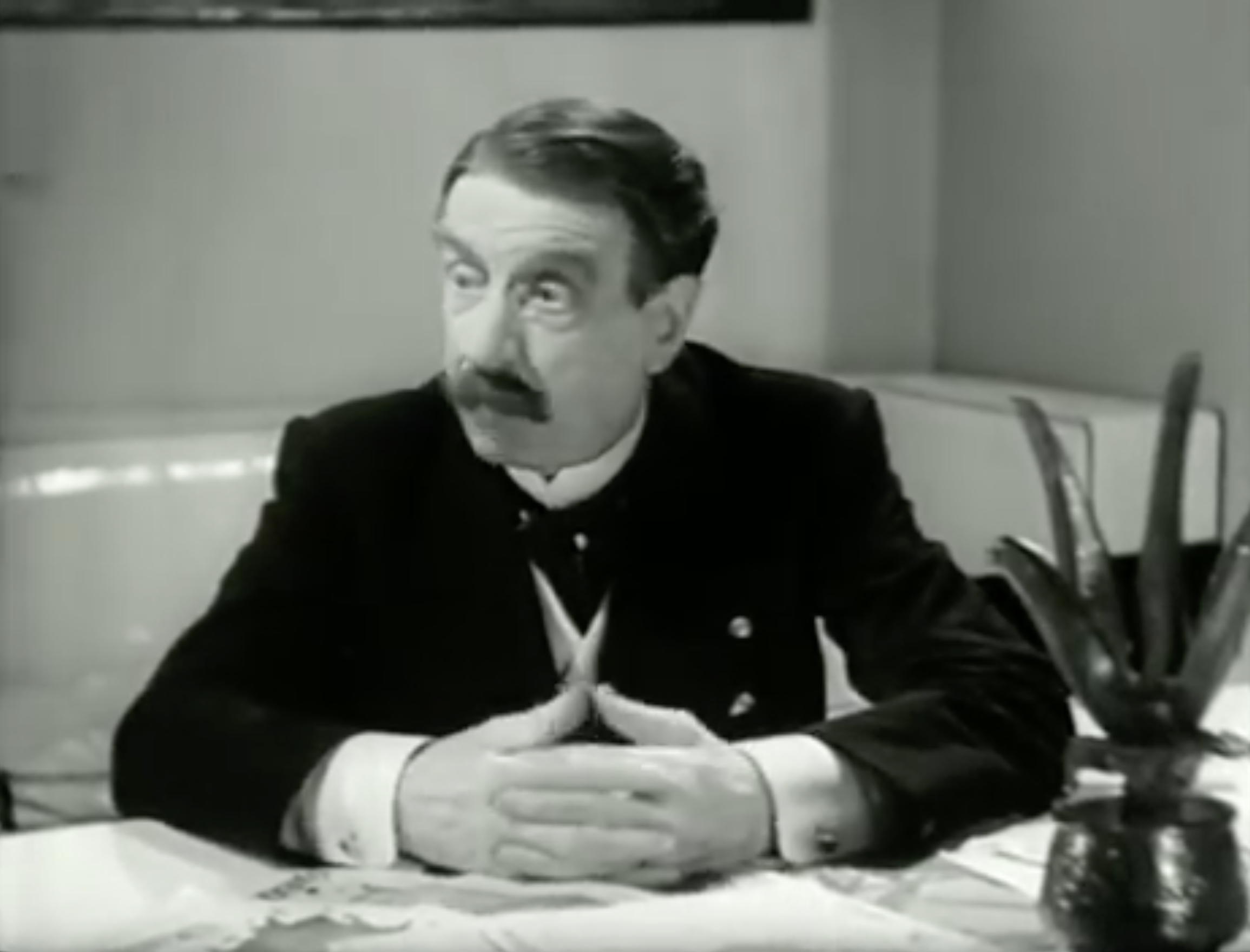
- Bertramo in Thirty Seconds of Love (1936)
- Born: 28 August 1875; Turin, Savoy, Italy
- Died: 30 September 1941 (aged 66); Viareggio, Tuscany, Italy
- Occupation: Actor
- Years active: 1924–1941 (film)

Calisto Bertramo (28 August 1875 – 30 September 1941) was an Italian stage and film actor. Bertramo appeared in around twenty films and frequently on the stage.

== Life and career ==
Born in Turin, after graduating from high school Bertramo began his acting career with Pia Marchi's theater company, with which he remained for three years. After touring in Italy, Russia and Romania with Italia Vitaliani's stage company, in the early 1900s he worked with Emma and Irma Gramatica, Ruggero Ruggeri, and Ermete Novelli. In 1918, he founded with Alda Borelli a stage company, active for two years. He played a leading role in the 1923 London staging of The Lady from the Sea. After working with Eleonora Duse and Tatyana Pavlova, between 1924 and 1929 he was active with a company he formed with his daughter Letizia and Umberto Casilini. In films, he was mainly active as a character actor.

== Selected filmography ==
- Messalina (1924)
- Paradise (1932)
- Cardinal Lambertini (1934)
- Adam's Tree (1936)
- Thirty Seconds of Love (1936)
- The Make Believe Pirates (1937)
- It Was I! (1937)
- Mad Animals (1939)
- Heartbeat (1939)
- One Hundred Thousand Dollars (1940)
- A Romantic Adventure (1940)
