= The Castiglioni Brothers =

1937 film

- Directed by: Corrado D'Errico
- Written by: Corrado D'Errico
- Based on: The Castiglioni Brothers by Alberto Colantuoni
- Produced by: Giuseppe Amato
- Starring: Camillo Pilotto; Ugo Ceseri; Amedeo Nazzari; Armando Migliari
- Cinematography: Václav Vích
- Edited by: Eraldo Da Roma
- Music by: Renzo Rossellini
- Production companies: Amato Film; Consorzione EIA
- Distributed by: ENIC
- Release date: 31 October 1937
- Running time: 67 minutes
- Country: Italy
- Language: Italian

The Castiglioni Brothers (Italian: I fratelli Castiglioni) is a 1937 Italian "white-telephones" comedy film directed by Corrado D'Errico and starring Camillo Pilotto, Ugo Ceseri and Amedeo Nazzari. It was based on a play of the same title by Alberto Colantuoni. The film's sets were designed by the art director Guido Fiorini.

Nazzari, who would go on to be the leading star of Italian cinema over the next two decades, was previously given a screen test by D'Errico who was dismissive of his talents.

== Cast ==
- Camillo Pilotto as Mario Castiglioni
- Ugo Ceseri as Ismaele Castiglioni
- Amedeo Nazzari as Fulvio Castiglioni
- Armando Migliari as Armando Castiglioni
- Luisa Ferida as Ninetta
- Olga Capri as Eusebia
- Silvio Bagolini as Valerio
- Vanna Vanni as Gisa
- Checco Durante as L'oste
- Enrico Viarisio as Avvocato De Ambrosio
- Raffaello Niccoli as Il notaio Giudi
- Claudio Ermelli as L'usciere
- Dina Perbellini as Berta

== Bibliography ==
- Gundle, Stephen (2013). Mussolini's Dream Factory: Film Stardom in Fascist Italy. Berghahn Books. ISBN 978-1-78238-244-7.
