= Palio (1932 film) =

1932 film

- Directed by: Alessandro Blasetti
- Written by: Luigi Bonelli (short stories); Gian Bistolfi; Alessandro Blasetti
- Starring: Leda Gloria; Laura Nucci; Guido Celano; Mario Ferrari
- Cinematography: Anchise Brizzi
- Edited by: Ignazio Ferronetti; Alessandro Blasetti
- Music by: Felice Lattuada
- Production company: Società Italiana Cines
- Distributed by: Società Italiana Cines
- Release date: 1932
- Running time: 90 minutes
- Country: Italy
- Language: Italian

Palio is a 1932 Italian historical drama film directed by Alessandro Blasetti and starring Leda Gloria, Laura Nucci and Guido Celano. The film is set against the backdrop of the Palio di Siena during the Medieval era.

== Cast ==
- Leda Gloria as Fiora
- Laura Nucci as Liliana
- Guido Celano as Zarre
- Mario Ferrari as Bachicche
- Mario Brizzolari as Dott. Turamini
- Olga Capri as La Cicciona, innkeeper
- Ugo Ceseri as Rancanino
- Vasco Creti as Brandano
- Mara Dussia as Vittoria de' Fortarrighi
- Anita Farra as Beatrice
- Umberto Sacripante as Saragiolo
- Gino Viotti as Gano

== See also ==
- List of films about horses
- List of films about horse races

== Bibliography ==
- Bondanella, Peter. A History of Italian Cinema. Bloomsbury Publishing, 2009.
