= No Turning Back (film) =

1945 film

- Directed by: Alessandro Blasetti
- Written by: Alba De Cespedes; Alessandro Blasetti; Vittorio Nino Novarese; Diego Calcagno; Paola Ojetti
- Based on: No Turning Back by Alba De Cespedes
- Produced by: Attilio Fattori; Romolo Sabbatini
- Starring: Elisa Cegani; Valentina Cortese; Maria Denis; Doris Duranti; Mariella Lotti; María Mercader; Dina Sassoli; Vittorio De Sica
- Cinematography: Václav Vích
- Edited by: Dolores Tamburini
- Music by: Alessandro Cicognini
- Production company: Artisti Associati
- Distributed by: Artisti Associati
- Release date: 5 January 1945
- Running time: 95 minutes
- Country: Italy
- Language: Italian

No Turning Back (Italian: Nessuno torna indietro) is a 1945 Italian drama film directed by Alessandro Blasetti and starring an ensemble cast including Elisa Cegani, Valentina Cortese, Maria Denis, Doris Duranti, Mariella Lotti, María Mercader, Dina Sassoli and Vittorio De Sica. It is based on the 1938 novel of the same title by Alba De Cespedes. It was shot at the Scalera Studios in Rome. The film's sets were designed by the art directors Guido Fiorini and Carlo Egidi. Made in 1943 during the Second World, due to disruption caused by the fighting in Italy, it did not go on release until January 1945.

== Synopsis ==
In the 1930s, a group of female students from very different backgrounds boarding together at university each deal with their own life challenges. One of them, Vinca, falls in love with a Spaniard who returns to fight in his country's civil war.

== Cast ==
- Elisa Cegani as Silvia Custo
- Valentina Cortese as Valentina
- Maria Denis as Anna Bortone
- Doris Duranti as Emanuela Andari
- Mariella Lotti as Xenia Costantini
- María Mercader as Vinca
- Dina Sassoli as Milly
- Vittorio De Sica as Maurizio
- Annibale Betrone as Il padre di Emanuela
- Elvira Betrone as La madre superiora
- Anna Capodaglio as Signorina Prudenzina
- Alberto Capozzi as Raimondo Horsch
- Ada Dondini as Signorina Lorenza
- Mino Doro as Dino Rizzi
- Giuseppina Fiore as Stefania
- Adele Garavaglia as La direttrice dell'istituto Grimaldi
- Nicola Maldacea as Il parroco
- Gilda Marchiò as Donna Ines
- Lamberto Picasso as Il rettore
- Giuditta Rissone as Dora Belluzzi
- Checco Rissone as Ignazio
- Ernesto Sabbatini as Monsignor Tommasi
- Bella Starace Sainati as Donna Antonia Bortone - nonna di Anna
- Filippo Scelzo as Guido Belluzzi
- Giovanna Scotto as Donna Matilde Bortone - madre di Anna
- Adriana Sivieri as Pilar
- Edda Soligo as Vandina
- Alberto Tavazzi as Ramiro
- Enzo Fiermonte as Mario Ponte
- Claudio Gora as Andrea
- Roldano Lupi as Luis
- Virgilio Riento as Don Alfonso Bortone - padre di Anna

== Bibliography ==
- Goble, Alan. The Complete Index to Literary Sources in Film. Walter de Gruyter, 1999.
- Schnapp, Jeffrey Thompson . Staging Fascism: 18BL and the Theater of Masses for Masses. Stanford University Press, 1996.
- Verdone, Luca. I Film di Alessandro Blasetti. Gremese Editore, 1989.
