= Redemption (1943 film) =

- Directed by: Marcello Albani
- Written by: Marcello Albani; Roberto Farinacci
- Starring: Carlo Tamberlani; Mario Ferrari; Camillo Pilotto
- Cinematography: Filiberto Emanuel Lomiry
- Edited by: Dolores Tamburini
- Music by: Mario Nascimbene
- Production companies: Andros Film; Artisti Associati
- Distributed by: Artisti Associati
- Release date: February 1943
- Running time: 85 minutes
- Country: Italy
- Language: Italian

Redemption (Italian: Redenzione) is a 1943 Italian drama film directed by Marcello Albani and starring Carlo Tamberlani, Mario Ferrari and Camillo Pilotto. It was shot at Cinecittà Studios in Rome. Made during wartime, it is a propaganda film written by Roberto Farinacci a leading Fascist supporter of Benito Mussolini.

== Synopsis ==
A communist deserts from the Italian Army in the closing stages of the First World War. He battles against the rise of the Fascist Party, but eventually changes sides and takes part in the March on Rome.

== Main cast ==
- Carlo Tamberlani as Giuseppe Madidini
- Mario Ferrari as Il segretario del fascio
- Camillo Pilotto as Il capolega
- Vera Carmi as Maria
- Mino Doro as Carlo
- Lauro Gazzolo as Tonio
- Aroldo Tieri as Giuseppe Bongiovanni

== Bibliography ==
- Peter Bondanella & Federico Pacchioni. A History of Italian Cinema. Bloomsbury Publishing, 2017.
