= Lucky to Be a Woman =

1956 film

- Film poster
- Directed by: Alessandro Blasetti
- Written by: Alessandro Blasetti; Suso Cecchi d'Amico; Sandro Continenza; Ennio Flaiano
- Produced by: Raymond Alexandre
- Starring: Sophia Loren; Charles Boyer; Marcello Mastroianni
- Cinematography: Otello Martelli
- Edited by: Mario Serandrei
- Music by: Alessandro Cicognini
- Release date: 1956
- Running time: 100 minutes
- Country: Italy
- Language: Italian

Lucky to Be a Woman (Italian: La fortuna di essere donna and also known as What a Woman!) is a 1956 Italian comedy film directed by Alessandro Blasetti and starring Sophia Loren, Charles Boyer and Marcello Mastroianni.

== Plot ==
A photographer named Corrado (Mastroianni) snaps a picture of Antonietta (Loren). When it shows up on the front page of a magazine, she wants to take him to court over it. He then tries to convince her that he can connect her up with powerful men and introduces her to Count Gregorio Sennetti (Boyer), who can make her a movie star, but things do not turn out well when the count's wife shows up.

== Cast ==
- Sophia Loren as Antonietta Fallari
- Charles Boyer as Count Gregorio Sennetti
- Marcello Mastroianni as Corrado Betti
- Elisa Cegani as Elena Sennetti
- Titina De Filippo as Antonietta's mother
- Nino Besozzi as Paolo Magnano
- Memmo Carotenuto as Gustavo Ippoliti
- Giustino Durano as Federico Frotta
- Margherita Bagni as Mirella Fontanisi
- Anna Carena as Brazilian billionaire
- Piero Carnabuci as President of the Film House
- Salvo Libassi as Sor Arduino
- Mauro Sacripante as Corrado's assistant photographer
- Nino Dal Fabbro as Journalist of Le Ore
- Mario Scaccia as Head waiter
