= Aldebaran (film) =

1935 film

- Directed by: Alessandro Blasetti
- Written by: Leo Bomba; Corrado D'Errico; Giuseppe Zucca; Alessandro Blasetti
- Produced by: Giulio Manenti
- Starring: Gino Cervi; Evi Maltagliati; Gianfranco Giachetti; Egisto Olivieri
- Cinematography: Ubaldo Arata; Massimo Terzano
- Edited by: Alessandro Blasetti
- Music by: Umberto Mancini
- Production company: Manenti Film
- Distributed by: MGM
- Release date: 1935
- Running time: 98 minutes
- Country: Italy
- Language: Italian

Aldebaran is a 1935 Italian drama film directed by Alessandro Blasetti and starring Gino Cervi, Evi Maltagliati and Gianfranco Giachetti. The film was a naval melodrama, an attempt by Blasetti to make a more commercial film following the difficulties encountered with the propagandist The Old Guard (1934).

== Plot ==
After a couple of projects had either been postponed or fallen through for Blasetti, it was suggested that he should make a film about the navy in peacetime. The result is this strange film, which at the outset plays like a propaganda piece for the might of the Italian navy, only to veer off into high melodrama, as it zeroes in on Commander Corrado Valeri (Gino Cervi), and his conflict between duty and the jealousy of his wife. There are comedic asides, a visit to a North African club, affording Blasetti to contribute the first scenes of nudity in Italian film, and there are moments of heroism, including a mission to rescue the doomed crew of a wrecked submarine. As if all of that was not more than enough, the film features a star-studded cast including Evi Maltagliati, Gianfranco Giachetti, Doris Duranti, Elisa Cegani (in her debut), and even a brief cameo by Blasetti himself.

== Cast ==
- Gino Cervi as Cmdr. Corrado Valeri
- Evi Maltagliati as Anna Weiss
- Gianfranco Giachetti as Adm. Claudio Valeri
- Egisto Olivieri as Cmdr. Stefano Devon
- Elisa Cegani as Nora Bandi
- Gianpaolo Rosmino as Luigi Bandi
- Ugo Ceseri as Bertrame
- Franco Coop as Chief quartermaster Gennarino
- Umberto Sacripante as Seaman Stella
- Vittorio Vaser as Rocchi
- Doris Duranti as Anna's friend
- Gemma Bolognesi as Giuditta
- Rosina Anselmi as Orsolina
- Ermanno Roveri as Solinas
- Piero Pastore as Sailor
- Aristide Garbini as Assist. boatswain
- Vasco Creti as Captain of the Titan
- Franco Brambilla (actor) as Young boy
- Mario Steni as Lt. Silich
- Luigi Pavese as Nora's friend
- Tatiana Pavoni as Carlotta
- Silvia Melandri as Elsa
- Dina Romano as Fortunato's mother
- Romolo Costa as Fortunato's brother
- Alessandro Blasetti as Radio operator

== Bibliography ==
- Moliterno, Gino. Historical Dictionary of Italian Cinema. Scarecrow Press, 2008.
