= The Countess of Parma =

1937 film

- Directed by: Alessandro Blasetti
- Written by: Alessandro Blasetti; Aldo De Benedetti; Gherardo Gherardi; Mario Soldati
- Produced by: Roberto Dandi
- Starring: Elisa Cegani; Antonio Centa; María Denis; Umberto Melnati
- Cinematography: Otello Martelli; Giovanni Vitrotti
- Edited by: Ignazio Ferronetti; Alessandro Blasetti
- Music by: Amedeo Escobar; Giovanni Fusco
- Production company: Industrie Cinematografiche Italiane
- Distributed by: Variety Distribution
- Release date: April 1937
- Running time: 86 minutes
- Country: Italy
- Language: Italian

The Countess of Parma (Italian: La contessa di Parma) is a 1937 Italian "white-telephones" comedy film directed by Alessandro Blasetti and starring Elisa Cegani, Antonio Centa and María Denis. Marcella, a mannequin working in a fashion store in Turin, falls in love with an Italian International football player whose aunt has just acquired the store intending to replace its reliance on French fashions with Italian designs. Blasetti later described it as his only "white telephone" film, although his 1939 comedy Backstage has also been noted for its similar characteristics.

It was shot at the Fert Studios in Turin and on location around the city including at the Stadio Municipale and the Mirafiori district where the racetrack scenes were staged. Exterior shots were also taken at the Avigliana Lakes and the resort town of Sestriere to the west of the city on the French border. Filming began in November 1936 and lasted through the winter, with the final shots being taken at Sestriere's ski resort.

== Cast ==
- Elisa Cegani as Marcella
- Antonio Centa as Gino Vanni
- María Denis as Adriana
- Umberto Melnati as Carrani
- Osvaldo Valenti as Duca di Fadda
- Nunzio Filogamo as Conte di Sebasta
- Ugo Ceseri as Marco
- Pina Gallini as Marta Rossi
- Marichetta Stoppa as Una Guardarobiera
- Giannina Chiantoni as La sarta della casa di mode
- Mario Lembo as Il tassista
- Pina Valli as Un'indossatrice
- Mirica Albis as Un'altra indossatrice

== Bibliography ==
- Liehm, Mira. Passion and Defiance: Film in Italy from 1942 to the Present. University of California Press, 1984.
- Moliterno, Gino. Historical Dictionary of Italian Cinema. Scarecrow Press, 2008.
- Paulicelli, Eugenia. Fashion Under Fascism: Beyond the Black Shirt. Berg, 2004.
