= Liolà (film) =

1963 film by Alessandro Blasetti

- Directed by: Alessandro Blasetti
- Written by: Luigi Pirandello (play); Alessandro Blasetti; Sergio Amidei; Adriano Bolzoni; Elio Bartolini
- Produced by: Nino Crisman
- Starring: Ugo Tognazzi; Giovanna Ralli; Pierre Brasseur; Anouk Aimée
- Cinematography: Leonida Barboni; Tonino Delli Colli; Carlo Di Palma
- Music by: Carlo Savina
- Release date: 1963
- Running time: 102 min
- Country: Italy
- Language: Italian

Liolà (Italian pronunciation: [ljoˈla]) is a 1963 Italian comedy film directed by Alessandro Blasetti. It is based on Liolà, a comedy play by Luigi Pirandello.

The film was released as A Very Handy Man in the U.S. in 1966.

== Plot summary ==
In late-nineteenth-century Sicily, the wealthy Zia Croce has a large, successful farm, which she runs with her cousin, Zio Simone. He is married to Mita, and is downcast because they do not have a son to inherit the farm. Zia Croce also has a daughter, who wants a son of her own for the same reason. Their situations are apparently solved, but actually complicated, by the appearance of Liola, whose seductive powers are put by both women to practical use.

== Cast ==
- Ugo Tognazzi: Liolà
- Giovanna Ralli: Tuzza Azzara
- Anouk Aimée: Mita
- Pierre Brasseur: Zio Simone Palumbo
- Elisa Cegani: Cesa
- Dolores Palumbo: Zia Croce
- Umberto Spadaro
- Graziella Granata
