= Ferruccio Biancini =

Italian actor (1890–1955)

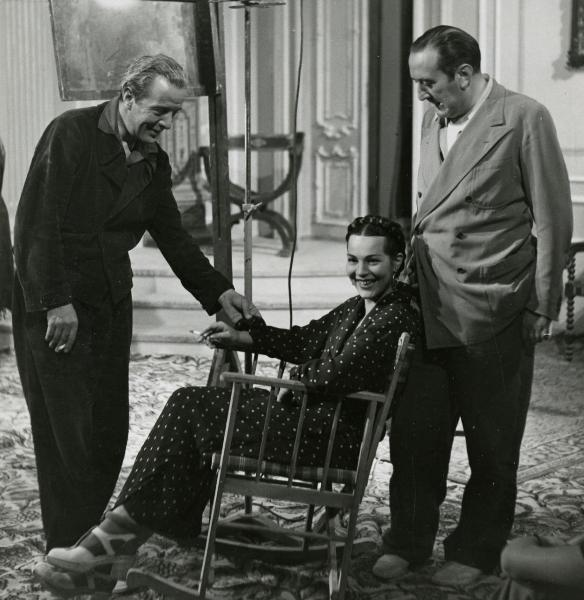
- Born: 18 August 1890; Pomponesco, Lombardy, Italy
- Died: 19 March 1955 (aged 64); Rome, Italy
- Occupations: Actor; Film producer Screenwriter; Film director
- Years active: 1916-1950

Ferruccio Biancini (18 August 1890 – 19 March 1955) was an Italian film actor, producer, screenwriter, and director. He appeared in 15 films between 1916 and 1950. He was born in Pomponesco, Lombardy and died in Rome.

== Selected filmography ==
- Captain Fracasse (1919)
- The Shadow (1920)
- Theodora (1921)
- The White Sister (1923)
- The Shepherd King (1923)
- The Last Days of Pompeii (1926)
- One Night with You (1932)
- Paprika (1933)
- Model Wanted (1933)
- The Song of the Sun (1934)
- The Lucky Diamond (1934)
- White Amazons (1936)
- Mother Song (1937)
- Departure (1938)
- Maddalena, Zero for Conduct (1940)
- The Beggar's Daughter (1950)
- Wedding Night In Paradise (1950)
- The Phantom Musketeer (1952)
- A Parisian in Rome (1954)
