= Paprika (1933 Italian film) =

1933 film directed by Carl Boese

- Directed by: Carl Boese
- Written by: Oreste Biancoli; Bobby E. Lüthge
- Based on: Der Sprung in die Ehe, a play by Max Reimann; Otto Schwartz
- Produced by: Ferruccio Biancini; Viktor Klein
- Starring: Vittorio De Sica
- Cinematography: Reimar Kuntze
- Edited by: Fernando Tropea
- Music by: Franz Waxman
- Release date: 1 November 1933
- Country: Italy
- Language: Italian

Paprika is a 1933 Italian "white-telephones" comedy film directed by Carl Boese and starring Vittorio De Sica. A German-language version Paprika and a French version Paprika were also made.

== Cast ==
- Renato Cialente as Paolo
- Vittorio De Sica
- Gianfranco Giachetti as Urbano
- Eva Magni as Lida Bonelli
- Elsa Merlini as Ilonka
- Sergio Tofano as Checco
- Enrico Viarisio as Massimo Bonelli

== See also ==
- Italian films of 1933
