= Souls in Turmoil =

1942 film directed by Giulio Del Torre

- Directed by: Giulio Del Torre
- Written by: Augusto Turati (novel); Luigi Bonelli; Marcello Pagliero
- Starring: Gina Falckenberg; Carlo Tamberlani; Leda Gloria
- Cinematography: Carlo Montuori
- Edited by: Ignazio Ferronetti
- Music by: Costantino Ferri
- Production companies: Sovrania Film; Stella Film
- Distributed by: Rex Film
- Release date: 4 April 1942
- Running time: 85 minutes
- Country: Italy
- Language: Italian

Souls in Turmoil (Italian: Anime in tumulto) is a 1942 Italian drama film directed by Giulio Del Torre and starring Gina Falckenberg, Carlo Tamberlani and Leda Gloria. The sets were designed by the art director Salvo D'Angelo. It was shot at the Cinecittà Studios in Rome.

== Cast ==
- Gina Falckenberg as Elena von Kreuser
- Carlo Tamberlani as Il professore Alberto Ferrari
- Leda Gloria as Anna
- Teresa Franchini as Teresa, la governante
- Sergio Tofano as Perego
- Emilio Petacci as Giuseppe, il maggiordomo
- Fedele Gentile as Il dottor Marini
- Galeazzo Benti as Un amico di Elena
- Aris Valeri as Arturo, L'autista

== Bibliography ==
- Goble, Alan. The Complete Index to Literary Sources in Film. Walter de Gruyter, 1999.
