= Figaro and His Great Day =

1931 film

Figaro e la Sua Gran Giornata
- Directed by: Mario Camerini
- Written by: Arnaldo Fraccaroli (play); Tomaso Smith
- Starring: Gianfranco Giachetti; Leda Gloria; Ugo Ceseri
- Cinematography: Massimo Terzano
- Edited by: Giuseppe Fatigati
- Music by: Felice Lattuada
- Production company: Società Italiana Cines
- Distributed by: Societa Anonima Stefano Pittaluga
- Release date: November 1931
- Running time: 85 minutes
- Country: Italy
- Language: Italian

Figaro e la sua gran giornata (in English, Figaro and his Great Day) is a 1931 Italian comedy film directed by Mario Camerini and starring Gianfranco Giachetti, Leda Gloria and Ugo Ceseri.

It was shot at the Cines Studios in Rome. The film's sets were designed by the art directors Gastone Medin and Ivo Perilli.

== Synopsis ==
In a small town in the Veneto region, an attempt to stage Rossini's The Barber of Seville is threatened when the prima donna loses her voice. An attempt is made to replace her with a singing student, but both her father and boyfriend object.

== Cast ==
- Gianfranco Giachetti as Piero Basoto
- Leda Gloria as Nina
- Ugo Ceseri as Rantoloni, l'impresario
- Maurizio D'Ancora as Asdrubale Chiodini
- Umberto Sacripante as Gedeone, il portaceste
- Olga Capri as Caterina, la fantesca
- Gemma Schirato as Costanza Basoto
- Augusto Bandini as Il maestro Salsuga
- Umberto Cocchi as Felicetti, il farmacista
- Giuseppe Gambardella as Gargaturi, il basso
- Achille Majeroni as Il padre di Nina
- Alfredo Martinelli as Sivoloni, il basso
- Angelo Parigi as Il tenore Pancrazi
- Carlo Ranieri as Un membro del circolo
- Raimondo Van Riel as Un delegato di polizia
- Gino Viotti as Il sindaco

== Bibliography ==
- Carlo Celli & Margo Cottino-Jones. A New Guide to Italian Cinema. Springer, 2007.
