= Gina Falckenberg =

German actress (1907–1996)

- Falckenberg in Souls in Turmoil
- Born: 14 September 1907; Emmering, Kingdom of Bavaria, German Empire
- Died: 12 February 1996 (aged 88); Lucca, Tuscany, Italy
- Occupation: Actress

Gina Falckenberg (14 September 1907 – 12 February 1996) was a German stage and film actress who appeared in 22 films, including Anime in tumult (1942). She also wrote and worked on several screenplays. She was married to the Italian actor Giulio del Torre.

== Selected filmography ==
=== Actress ===
- A Man with Heart (1932)
- Raid in St. Pauli (1932)
- Holiday From Myself (1934)
- The Gypsy Baron (1935)
- The Impossible Woman (1936)
- The Accusing Song (1936)
- Love's Awakening (1936)
- The Voice of the Heart (1937)
- After Midnight (1938)
- Souls in Turmoil (1942)
- Crossroads of Passion (1948)
- Women Without Names (1950)

=== Screenwriter ===
- My Father, the Actor (1956)
- The Hero of My Dreams (1960)
- I Will Always Be Yours (1960)
