= One Night with You (1932 film) =

1932 film

- Directed by: Ferruccio Biancini; E. W. Emo
- Written by: Hans Julius Wille; Max W. Kimmich; Oreste Biancoli; Leo Menardi; Dino Falconi
- Starring: Elsa Merlini; Nino Besozzi; Ugo Ceseri
- Cinematography: Willy Goldberger
- Music by: Fred Raymond
- Production company: Itala Film
- Distributed by: Societa Anonima Stefano Pittaluga
- Release date: 7 December 1932
- Running time: 66 minutes
- Country: Italy
- Language: Italian

One Night with You (Italian: Una notte con te) is a 1932 Italian "white-telephones" comedy film directed by Ferruccio Biancini and E. W. Emo and starring Elsa Merlini, Nino Besozzi, and Ugo Ceseri. It was made as a MLV, with a German version Little Girl, Great Fortune also released.

== Cast ==
- Elsa Merlini as La falsa ladra
- Nino Besozzi as Il giovine scapolo
- Ugo Ceseri as Il commissario
- Martha Ziegler as La cameriera straniera
- Giana Cellini as Fidanzata del scapolo
- Angelo Ferrari
- Evelina Paoli

== Bibliography ==
- Attolini, Vito (1988). Dal romanzo al set: cinema italiano dalle origini ad oggi [From Novel to Set: Italian Cinema from Its Origins to Today] (in Italian). Bari: Edizioni Dedalo. ISBN 978-88-220-4527-0.
