= Nino Crisman =

Italian actor and film producer

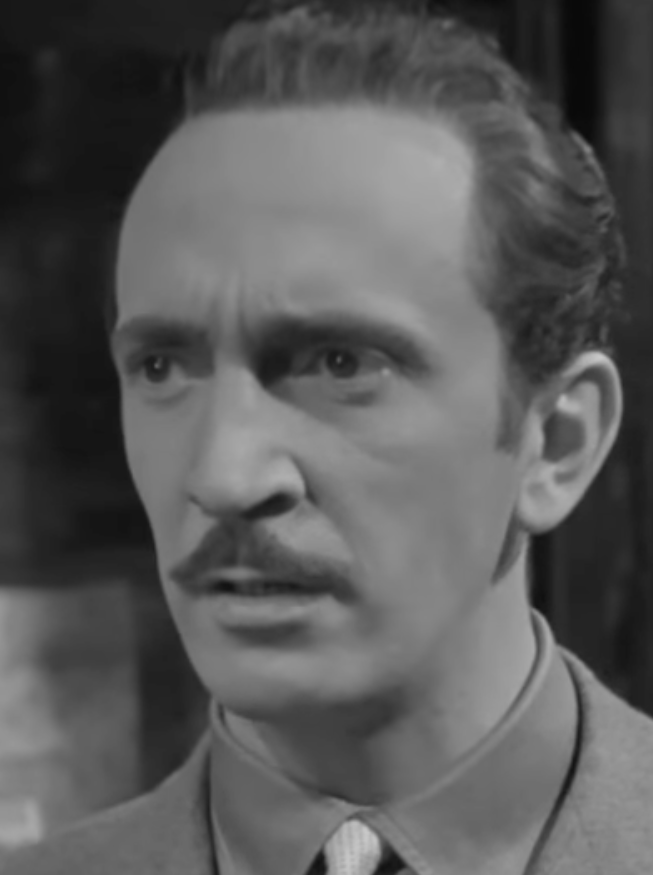
- Crisman in Two Hearts (1943)
- Born: 27 October 1911; Trieste; Austro-Hungarian Empire
- Died: 15 November 1983 (aged 72); Rome, Lazio; Italy
- Other name: Ettore Krisman
- Occupation: Actor; Producer
- Years active: 1939 - 1974

Nino Crisman (27 October 1911 – 15 November 1983) was an Italian actor and film producer. Crisman was born in the port city of Trieste when it was still a part of the Austro-Hungarian Empire. Crisman made his film debut in 1939 during the Fascist era. He appeared as an actor in over thirty films, such as El Greco (1966). From 1959 onwards he also began to produce films. He was married to the actress Rossana Martini.

== Selected filmography ==
=== Actor ===
- Dora Nelson (1939)
- Backstage (1939)
- Department Store (1939)
- The Siege of the Alcazar (1940)
- Caravaggio (1941)
- Malombra (1942)
- I Live as I Please (1942)
- Two Hearts (1943)
- Macario Against Zagomar (1944)
- Turri il bandito (1950)
- I'm the Capataz (1951)
- Angela (1955)
- Burning Fuse (1957)
- The Black Devil (1957)
- La vita agra (1964)
- The Dirty Game (1965)
- El Greco (1966)

=== Producer ===
- Liolà (1963)
- La vita agra (1964)
- Roma Bene (1971)

== Bibliography ==
- Klossner, Michael. The Europe of 1500-1815 on Film and Television. McFarland & Co., 2002.
