= Paul Paviot =

French film director

- Born: 11 March 1926; Paris, France
- Died: 23 November 2017 (aged 91); Luxey, France
- Occupations: Film director Screenwriter
- Years active: 1952–1974

Paul Paviot (11 March 1926 – 23 November 2017) was a French film director and screenwriter. He directed 17 films between 1952 and 1974.

== Selected filmography ==
- A Slice of Life (1954)
