= Simón Bolívar (1969 film) =

1969 film

- Film poster
- Directed by: Alessandro Blasetti
- Written by: José Luis Dibildos; Enrique Llovet
- Starring: Maximilian Schell
- Cinematography: Manuel Berenguer
- Music by: Carlo Savina; Aldemaro Romero
- Release date: 12 September 1969
- Running time: 106 minutes
- Country: Spain
- Language: Spanish

Simón Bolívar is a 1969 Spanish drama film directed by Alessandro Blasetti. It stars Maximilian Schell as the Venezuelan military and political leader Simón Bolívar, who helped much of Latin America achieve independence from Spain. The film was entered into the 6th Moscow International Film Festival.

== Cast ==
- Maximilian Schell as Simón Bolívar
- Rosanna Schiaffino as Consuelo Hernandez
- Francisco Rabal as José Antonio Del Llano
- Barta Barri
- Elisa Cegani as Conchita Diaz Moreno
- Ángel del Pozo
- Luis Dávila as Carlos
- Manuel Gil
- Sancho Gracia
- Tomás Henríquez as Negro Primero
- Julio Peña as Señor Hernandez
- Conrado San Martín as Gen. José Antonio Paez
- Fernando Sancho as Fernando Gonzales
