= Felice Lattuada =

Italian composer (1882–1962)

Felice Lattuada (photo with 1958 dedication)

Felice Lattuada (Italian pronunciation: [feˈliːtʃe lattuˈaːda, - latˈtwaːda]; 5 February 1882 – 2 November 1962) was an Italian composer.

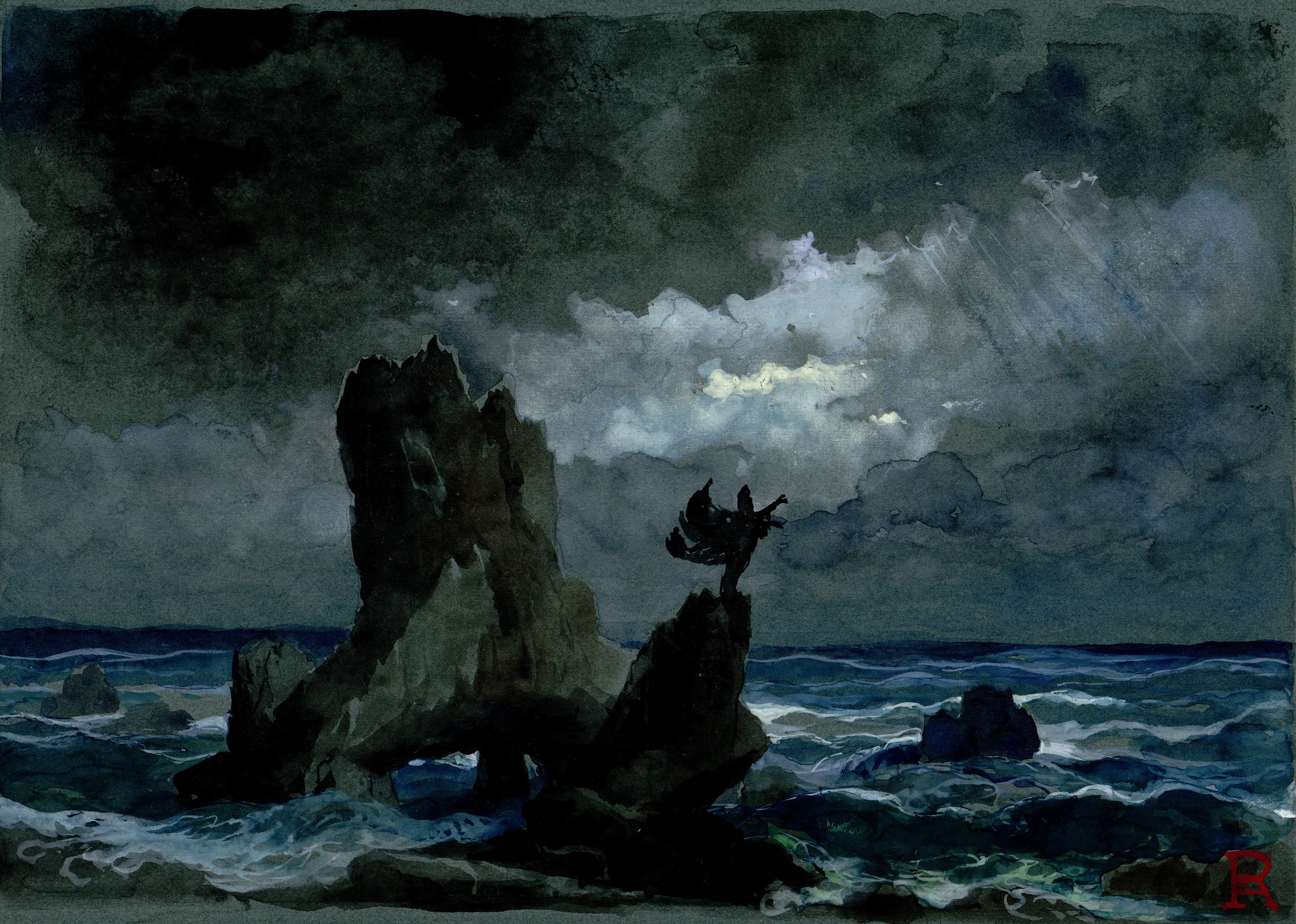
Uno scoglio. La Tempesta, set design for La tempesta prologue (1922)

Lattuada was born at Caselle di Morimondo, near Milan. In his early adulthood, he worked as a school teacher and was a self-taught amateur composer. That changed when he entered the Milan Conservatory in 1907. He studied composition there under V. Ferroni for five years, graduating in 1912. Among his works are several orchestral and chamber music pieces written in a strongly lyrical and expressive character derived from the late-Romantic tradition. He also wrote several works for the stage including Don Giovanni, which won the Concorso Nazionale della Pubblica Istruzione in 1928. Lattuada was director of the Civica Scuola di Musica in Milan from 1935 to 1962. His son Alberto Lattuada (1914−2005) was a well-known film director, and the two collaborated on several projects during the 1940s. Lattuada's film scores were often more traditional in nature as opposed to his son's more innovative approach to film direction.

He died in Milan in 1962.

== Selected filmography ==
- Figaro and His Great Day (1931)
- Palio (1932)
- Yes, Madam (1942)
- Giacomo the Idealist (1943)
- Il delitto di Giovanni Episcopo (1947)
