= A Slice of Life (1954 film) =

1954 film

A Slice of Life (Tempi nostri - Zibaldone N° 2)
- Film poster
- Directed by: Alessandro Blasetti; Paul Paviot
- Written by: Age & Scarpelli; Achille Campanile; Alberto Moravia; Silvio D'Arzo; Giuseppe Marotta; Giorgio Bassani; Eduardo De Filippo; Ennio Flaiano; Sandro Continenza; Vittorio De Sica; Suso Cecchi d'Amico; Vasco Pratolini; Alessandro Blasetti; Ercole Patti
- Produced by: Dino De Laurentiis; Carlo Ponti
- Starring: Vittorio De Sica; Totò; Sophia Loren; Eduardo De Filippo; Marcello Mastroianni; Alberto Sordi
- Cinematography: Gábor Pogány
- Edited by: Mario Serandrei
- Music by: Gorni Kramer; Alessandro Cicognini
- Distributed by: Lux Film
- Release date: 16 March 1954
- Running time: 134 minutes
- Countries: Italy; France
- Language: Italian

A Slice of Life (Italian: Tempi nostri, French: Quelques pas dans la vie, also known as The Anatomy of Love) is a 1954 Italian comedy film directed by Alessandro Blasetti and Paul Paviot.

== Plot ==
=== Mara ===
From a story by Vasco Pratolini, written by the author.

Vasco and Mara get to know in a restaurant, go to the cinema, and spent the evening intimately, fall in love. She tells him that, being short of money, will try to work the next morning in a brothel, but he convinces her to desist from this connection, to begin to live with him, who has a job as a teacher, even if their economic situation may be difficult.

=== The baby ===
Written by Alberto Moravia. Young couple the suburbs of Rome are in financial trouble. She would like to work, but must take care of the child who has recently given birth. The two then set out, reluctantly, to leave the baby in a church, but the mother can not decide on the right place and finally the father has second thoughts.

=== Outdoor scene ===
From a story of Marino Moretti, written by Ennio Flaiano.

A man and a woman no longer young, fallen nobility, meet again by chance after many years as they are worded as film extras in a carriage in motion. During the scene must speak, not heard, a theme to their liking. The scene is repeated several times, and so was born the opportunity to confide things that I had said many years ago. Finally decide to get married and run away from the set at the edge of the carriage.

=== Other people's houses ===
From a story by Silvio D'Arzo.

The old priest of a small mountain village realizes that the old Zelinda has for some time sad and thoughtful. After much persuasion, can be confident that the poor thing has soul: he would like to end prematurely to his strenuous and monotonous life. Mind the sacedordote search animatedly distogliela this regard, slips off a cliff and save it Zelinda pulling it upward.

=== Don Conrad ===
Subject of Giuseppe Marotta, dialogues by Eduardo De Filippo.

Don Conrad, a driver of public transport, paying court to love many women, that because of defaults on work that is not forgiven by his superior Amedeo. During a bus ride, his young friend Lando says he is dissatisfied with her boyfriend Michael, and understand to be attracted to him.

=== The camera ===
By Age & Scarpelli.

A girl Sophia Loren, is left by photographers friends in a room where he set up a game where you can win a camera. A customer Totò, helps her win the coveted prize, then walks away with her from the room without paying, and asked her to pose for the camera test, until he confesses to be with her by the court. So they try, unsuccessfully, to take a picture together with the help of the self timer, which the machine is equipped. After several attempts, they decide to make taking the picture with help from a stranger passing by for the event, which, after having distracted the two making them pose, runs away with the camera.

== Cast ==
=== Mara ===
- Yves Montand: Vasco
- Danièle Delorme: Mara

=== Il pupo ===
- Lea Padovani: Maria
- Marcello Mastroianni: marito di Maria

=== Scena all'aperto ===
- Vittorio De Sica: cocchiere
- Elisa Cegani: Lidia

=== Casa d'altri ===
- Michel Simon: prete
- Sylvie: Zelinda

=== Don Corradino ===
- Vittorio De Sica: Don Corradino Scognamiglio
- Eduardo De Filippo: Amedeo Stigliano
- Maria Fiore: Nannì
- Marilyn Buferd:
- Turi Pandolfini

=== La macchina fotografica ===
- Sophia Loren: ragazza
- Totò: avventore
- Mario Castellani: barista

=== Il bacio ===
- Dany Robin
- François Périer

=== Gli innamorati ===
- Andrea Checchi
- Alba Arnova

=== Scusi, ma... ===
- Alberto Sordi
- Enrico Viarisio
