= Gianfranco Giachetti =

Italian actor (1888–1936)

- Born: 27 September 1888; Florence, Tuscany, Italy
- Died: 29 November 1936 (aged 48); Rome, Lazio, Italy
- Occupation: Actor
- Years active: 1931–1936 (film)

Gianfranco Giachetti (27 September 1888 – 29 November 1936) was an Italian stage and film actor. He played the role of Father Costanzo in Alessandro Blasetti's historical film 1860. The same year, he appeared in The Old Guard as Doctor Cardini, the father of a young blackshirt who is killed in a street fight.

== Selected filmography ==
- Figaro and His Great Day (1931)
- The Opera Singer (1932)
- The Last Adventure (1932)
- Paprika (1933)
- Model Wanted (1933)
- The Lucky Diamond (1933)
- 1860 (1934)
- The Old Guard (1934)
- Aldebaran (1935)

== Bibliography ==
- Landy, Marcia. Italian Film. Cambridge University Press, 2000 .
