= Ignazio Ferronetti =

Italian film editor and director

- Born: 15 October 1908 (age 117); Rome, Lazio; Italy
- Occupations: Editor; Director
- Years active: 1930 - 1961

Ignazio Ferronetti (born 1908) was an Italian film editor and director. Ferronetti worked as an editor on over thirty films, including a number with Alessandro Blasetti such as the 1934 historical epic 1860. From 1943 he also began directing films, including several documentaries.

== Selected filmography ==
=== Editor ===
- The Table of the Poor (1932)
- Palio (1932)
- 1860 (1934)
- The Old Guard (1934)
- The Countess of Parma (1936)
- But It's Nothing Serious (1936)
- The Dance of Time (1936)
- Ettore Fieramosca (1938)
- Backstage (1939)
- The Night of Tricks (1939)
- Carmela (1942)
- Souls in Turmoil (1942)
- The Countess of Castiglione (1942)
- Dagli Appennini alle Ande (1943)
- Calafuria (1943)
- Resurrection (1944)

=== Director ===
- The Mysteries of Venice (1951)

== Bibliography ==
- Bertellini, Giorgio. The Cinema of Italy. Wallflower Press, 2004.
