= Unripe Fruit =

1934 film

- Directed by: Carlo Ludovico Bragaglia
- Written by: Carlo Ludovico Bragaglia; Régis Gignoux (play); Virginio Lilli; Raffaello Matarazzo; Leo Menardi; Jacques Théry (play)
- Produced by: Roberto Dandi
- Starring: Lotte Menas; Nino Besozzi; Maria Wronska
- Cinematography: Ubaldo Arata; Carlo Montuori
- Edited by: Fernando Tropea
- Music by: Nicholas Brodszky; Felice Montagnini
- Production company: Industrie Cinematografiche Italiane
- Distributed by: Variety Distribution
- Release date: 1934
- Country: Italy
- Language: Italian

Unripe Fruit (Italian: Frutto acerbo) is a 1934 Italian comedy film directed by Carlo Ludovico Bragaglia and starring Lotte Menas, Nino Besozzi and Maria Wronska. A German-language version of the same story was made in Austria as A Precocious Girl.

== Cast ==
- Lotte Menas as Lucy Carell - attrice di varietà
- Nino Besozzi as Giorgio Verni
- Maria Wronska as Madre di Lucy
- Ugo Ceseri as Professore Ugoti
- Matilde Casagrande as Gertrude - la governante
- Giuseppe Porelli as Maggiordomo
- Elevira Borelli as Eva
- Nino Lary as Gigino
- Luigi Cimara as Edoardo Manni
- Carlo Petrangeli as Tort
- Jone Frigerio as Educatrice
- Alberto Gabrielli
- Lucia Cannone

== Bibliography ==
- Pietro Piemontese. Remake: il cinema e la via dell'eterno ritorno. Castelvecchi, 2000.
