= Dina Perbellini =

Italian actress (1901–1984)

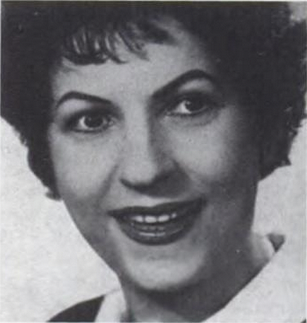
- Born: 14 January 1901; Vicenza, Kingdom of Italy
- Died: 2 April 1983 (aged 82); Rome, Italy
- Occupation: Actress
- Years active: 1934–1969 (film)

Dina Perbellini (14 January 1901 – 2 April 1983) was an Italian actress. She appeared in over sixty films and television series between 1934 and 1969 and was also a leading voice actress, dubbing foreign films for release in Italy.

== Career ==
Born in Vicenza, Perbellini made her acting debut at 20, as a member of the Gualtiero Tumiati's stage company. She later worked in numerous companies including those led by Aldo Silvani, Emma Gramatica and Antonio Gandusio, before starting her own company together with colleagues Augusto Mastrantoni and Miranda Campa in 1930. She made her film debut in the 1934 school comedy Seconda B, credited as Dirce Bellini. After appearing in numerous other films, she eventually decided to use her real name starting from the late 1930s. Starting from 1950s she was also active as an acting teacher, and between 1962 and 1968 she taught at the Centro Sperimentale di Cinematografia in Rome. She was also very active as a radio actress and as a dubber.

== Partial filmography ==
- Seconda B (1934) - Professorina Vanni
- Three Cornered Hat (1935) - Donna Dolores, moglie del governatore
- Le scarpe al sole (1935) - La moglie di Bepo
- Ginevra degli Almieri (1936)
- Amore (1936) - Luisa
- The Castiglioni Brothers (1937) - Berta
- It Was I! (1937) - Signora in villeggiatura
- The Last Days of Pompeo (1937)
- Il conte di Brechard (1938)
- La sposa dei re (1938) - La signora Clary
- Crispino e la comare (1938) - La comare
- The Marquis of Ruvolito (1939) - La contessa Scoperlati
- Il barone di Corbò (1939) - Didone
- Mad Animals (1939) - La direttrice dell'ospedale degli animali
- Il ladro sono io (1940) - Giulia
- Alessandro sei grande! (1940) - Olga Dell'Incanto
- The Sinner (1940) - Ortensia (uncredited)
- Captain Fracasse (1940) - La marchesa Di Bruyeres
- Pensaci Giacomino (1940) - (uncredited)
- The Happy Ghost (1941) - Zia Giovanna
- La compagnia della teppa (1941) - La signora Mellario
- The Iron Crown (1941) - La nutrice (uncredited)
- Pia de' Tolomei (1941) - Tonia, la guardiana
- Yes, Madam (1942) - Signora Bracco-Rinaldi
- Short Circuit (1943) - La contessa
- Gioco d'azzardo (1943)
- The Children Are Watching Us (1944) - Zia Berelli
- Chi l'ha visto? (1945)
- What a Distinguished Family (1945) - Olga
- My Beautiful Daughter (1950) - Mrs. Favarelli
- Hearts at Sea (1950) - Madre di Leone
- Appointment for Murder (1951) - Signora Rosini
- Anna (1951) - Una malata
- Porca miseria (1951) - The Pension Owner (uncredited)
- Vacation with a Gangster (1952)
- The Overcoat (1952)
- In Olden Days (1952) - Madre della sposa (segment "Pot-pourri di canzoni")
- I figli non si vendono (1952)
- Who is Without Sin (1952) - La madre superiora (uncredited)
- Perdonami! (1953) - (uncredited)
- I Chose Love (1953)
- Vortice (1953) - Suora infermiera
- Naples Sings (1953) - The Mother Superior
- Angels of Darkness (1954) - Woman with a Carnation in her Hands (uncredited)
- Schiava del peccato (1954) - La signora Cesira
- Camilla (1954)
- I cinque dell'Adamello (1954) - Madre di Piero
- Friends for Life (1955) - (uncredited)
- Giuramento d'amore (1955) - Clara's Aunt
- Io piaccio (1955)
- Altair (1956)
- Incatenata dal destino (1956)
- Tempo di villeggiatura (1956) - Silvana's Mother
- Il prezzo della gloria (1956) - zia Dora
- Saranno uomini (1957)
- Husbands in the City (1957) - La cognata (uncredited)
- Un amore senza fine (1958)
- La cambiale (1959) - The Marquise at the pet shop
- Il principe fusto (1960) - Madre di Susan
- Le bal des espions (1960)
- Madri pericolose (1960) - Countess Federica Ornano1960
- Totò, Peppino e... la dolce vita (1961) - Luisa Giovanna
- Se necesita chico (1963) - Doña Petra
- Il cavaliere inesistente (1969) - (final film role)
