= Seconda B =

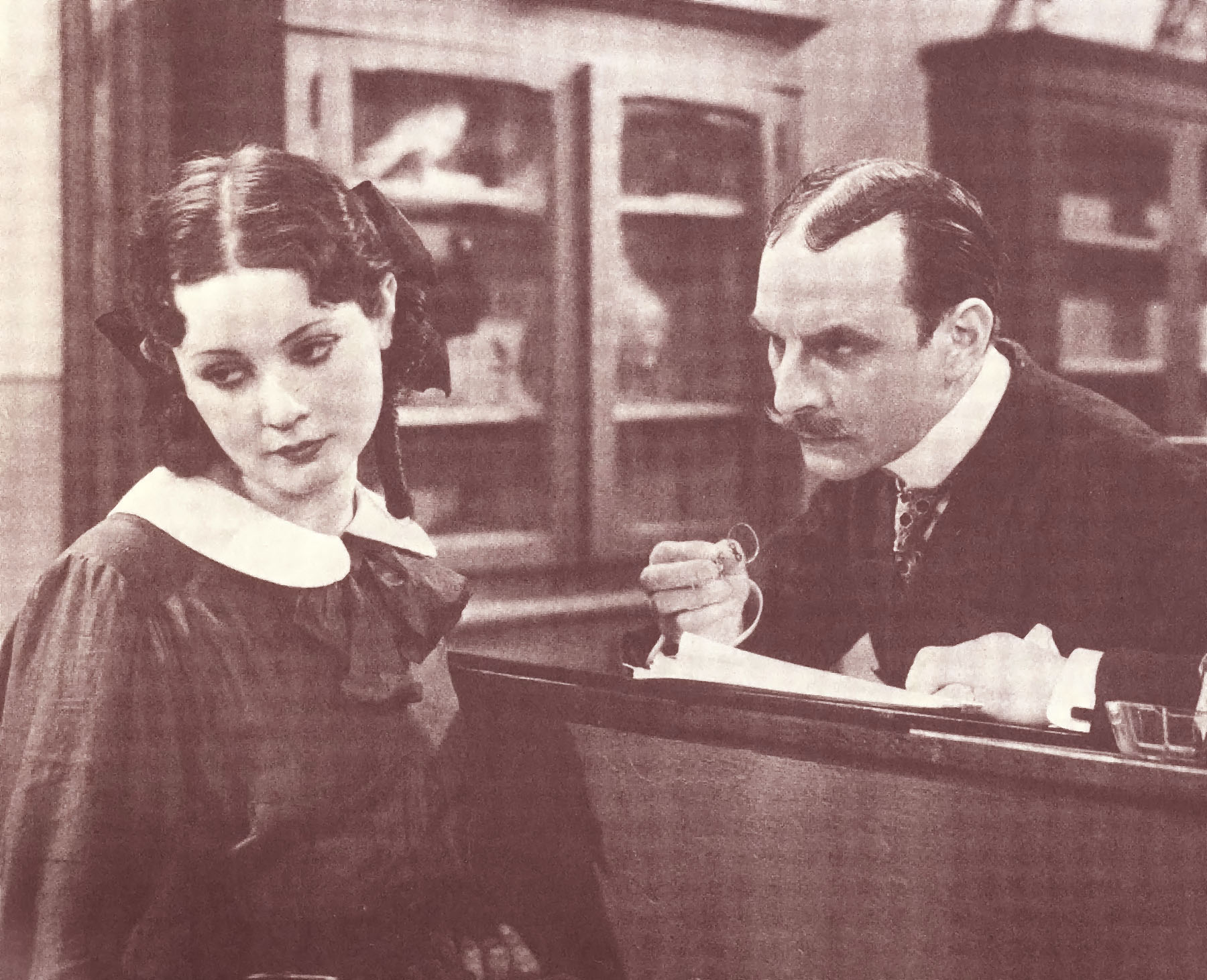
- María Denis and Sergio Tofano
- Directed by: Goffredo Alessandrini
- Written by: Umberto Barbaro; Goffredo Alessandrini
- Starring: Sergio Tofano; Dina Perbellini; María Denis; Ugo Ceseri
- Cinematography: Carlo Montuori
- Edited by: Giorgio Simonelli
- Music by: Antonio Antonini
- Production company: ICAR
- Distributed by: Cinès-Pittaluga
- Release date: 1934
- Running time: 76 minutes
- Country: Italy
- Language: Italian

Seconda B is a 1934 Italian comedy film directed by Goffredo Alessandrini and starring Sergio Tofano, Dina Perbellini and María Denis. It was screened at the Venice Film Festival where it was awarded a prize. It started a trend for "schoolgirl comedies" during the Fascist era, targeted primarily at girls and young women audiences. The title itself refers to a school class. The film is set in the early 1910s.

== Synopsis ==
A school teacher falls in love with one of his female colleagues, who teaches gymnastics. She returns his love, but this is discovered by his students who try to sabotage their relationship.

== Main cast ==
- Sergio Tofano as Professore Monti
- Dina Perbellini as Professorina Vanni
- María Denis as Marta Renzi
- Ugo Ceseri as L'onorevole Renzi
- Cesare Zoppetti as Il preside
- Umberto Sacripante as Il bidello
- Mercedes Brignone as Un'invitata alla festa dei Renzi
- Gino Viotti as Un insegnante
- Alfredo Martinelli as Un altro insegnante
- Vinicio Sofia as Il segretario di Renzi
- Liselotte Smith as Una compagna di scuola di Marta
- Dora Baldanello as Petronilla
- Amina Pirani Maggi as Signora Renzi
- Zoe Incrocci as L'allieva Fumasoni
- Elena Tryan-Parisini as L'insegnante di francese
- Lina Bacci as L'insegnante Zucchi
- Celeste Aída as Signora Cesira
- Albino Principe as Un invitato al festo

== Bibliography ==
- De Grazia, Victoria. How Fascism Ruled Women: Italy, 1922-1945. University of California Press, 1992.
- Moliterno, Gino. The A to Z of Italian Cinema. Scarecrow Press, 2009.
- Reich, Jacqueline & Garofalo, Piero. Re-viewing Fascism: Italian Cinema, 1922-1943. Indiana University Press, 2002.
