= The Make Believe Pirates =

1937 film

- Directed by: Marco Elter
- Written by: Curt Alexander; Guglielmo Giannini
- Starring: Assia Noris
- Cinematography: Otello Martelli
- Release date: 1937
- Running time: 87 minutes
- Country: Italy
- Language: Italian

The Make Believe Pirates (Italian: Allegri masnadieri) is a 1937 Italian "white-telephones" comedy film directed by Marco Elter. It was shown as part of a retrospective on Italian comedy at the 67th Venice International Film Festival.

== Cast ==
- Assia Noris
- Mino Doro (as Mino d'Oro)
- Camillo Pilotto
- Calisto Bertramo
- Olivia Fried
- Giorgio De Rege (as Fratelli de Rege)
- Virgilio Riento
- Rosanna Schettina
- Guido De Rege
