= The Lucky Diamond =

1933 film directed by Carl Boese

- Directed by: Carl Boese
- Written by: Robert A. Stemmle
- Produced by: Ferruccio Biancini; Alberto Giacalone
- Starring: Vittorio De Sica
- Cinematography: Eduard Hoesch
- Edited by: Hilde Grebner
- Release date: 22 December 1933
- Running time: 87 minutes
- Country: Italy
- Language: Italian

The Lucky Diamond (Italian: Lisetta) is a 1933 Italian "white-telephones" comedy film directed by Carl Boese and starring Vittorio De Sica.

== Cast ==
- Elsa Merlini - Lisetta
- Renato Cialente
- Vittorio De Sica
- Memo Benassi
- Gianfranco Giachetti
