= But It's Nothing Serious =

1936 film

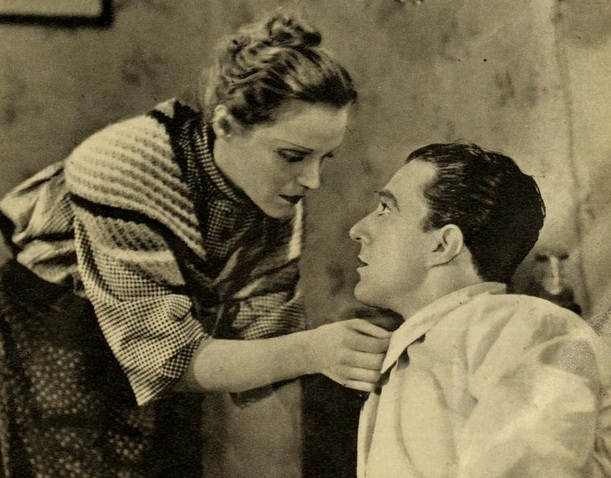
- Directed by: Mario Camerini
- Written by: Luigi Pirandello (play); Mario Soldati; Ercole Patti; Hans Rameau
- Starring: Vittorio De Sica; Elisa Cegani; Assia Noris
- Cinematography: Massimo Terzano
- Edited by: Ignazio Ferronetti; Fernando Tropea
- Music by: Gian Luca Tocchi
- Production company: Colombo Film
- Distributed by: ENIC
- Release date: April 1936
- Running time: 79 minutes
- Country: Italy
- Language: Italian

But It's Nothing Serious (Italian: Ma non è una cosa seria) is a 1936 Italian "white-telephones" romantic comedy film directed by Mario Camerini and starring Vittorio De Sica, Elisa Cegani and Assia Noris. It is based on a play by Luigi Pirandello. Two years later Camerini remade it as a German film The Man Who Couldn't Say No.

The film's sets were designed by the art director Gastone Medin. It was shot at the studios of Caesar Film in Rome.

== Cast ==
- Vittorio De Sica as Memmo Speranza
- Elisa Cegani as Gasperina
- Umberto Melnati as Vico Lamanna
- Assia Noris as Loletta Festa
- Elsa De Giorgi as Elsa
- Ugo Ceseri as Barranco
- Vivi Gioi as Matilde
- Giuseppe Pierozzi as Un pensionnaire
- Maria Arcione
- Celeste Calza
- Jole Capodaglio
- Antonio Centa
- Mario Ferrari
- Giuliana Gianni
- Zoe Incrocci
- Carola Lotti
- Dina Romano
- Lia Rosa
- Nietta Zocchi

== See also ==
- But It Isn't Serious (1921)

== Bibliography ==
- Bert Cardullo. Screening the Stage: Studies in Cinedramatic Art. Peter Lang, 2006.
