= Model Wanted =

1933 film

- Directed by: E. W. Emo
- Written by: Oreste Biancoli; Curt Siodmak; Charlie Roellinghoff (story); G. Jacobi (story)
- Produced by: Ferruccio Biancini
- Starring: Elsa Merlini; Nino Besozzi; Gianfranco Giachetti
- Cinematography: Hugo von Kaweczynski
- Music by: Otto Stransky
- Production company: Itala Film
- Distributed by: Cinès-Pittaluga
- Release date: 1933
- Running time: 90 minutes
- Country: Italy
- Language: Italian

Model Wanted (Italian: Cercasi modella) is a 1933 Italian "white-telephones" comedy film directed by E. W. Emo and starring Elsa Merlini, Nino Besozzi, and Gianfranco Giachetti. It is the Italian-language version of the German comedy film Marion, That's Not Nice, also directed by Emo.

== Cast ==
- Elsa Merlini as Elsa Sartorio
- Nino Besozzi as Alberto Bacci
- Gianfranco Giachetti as Michele Sardi
- Ugo Ceseri as Pacifico Sartorio
- Olly Gebauer
- Angelo Ferrari
- Ernesto Benda

== Bibliography ==
- Scaglione, Massimo (2005). I divi del ventennio: per vincere ci vogliono i leoni (in Italian). Torino: Lindau. ISBN 978-88-7180-561-0.
