= Guido Fiorini =

Italian architect and scenographer (1891–1965)

- Born: 1 July 1897; Bologna, Emilia-Romagna, Italy
- Died: 4 January 1966 (aged 68); Rome, Lazio, Italy
- Occupation: Art director
- Years active: 1934–1960 (film)

Guido Fiorini (1897–1966) was an Italian engineer, architect and art director. He was associated with the futurist movement.

== Selected filmography ==
- Loyalty of Love (1934)
- Just Married (1934)
- Red Passport (1935)
- Adam's Tree (1936)
- The Former Mattia Pascal (1937)
- Marcella (1937)
- The Man from Nowhere (1937)
- The Three Wishes (1937)
- Tonight at Eleven (1938)
- Princess Tarakanova (1938)
- The Life of Giuseppe Verdi (1938)
- I Want to Live with Letizia (1938)
- Castles in the Air (1939)
- Department Store (1939)
- The Dream of Butterfly (1939)
- Abandonment (1940)
- Beyond Love (1940)
- Manon Lescaut (1940)
- Eternal Melodies (1940)
- Saint Rogelia (1940)
- The Sin of Rogelia Sanchez (1940)
- Beatrice Cenci (1941)
- Odessa in Flames (1942)
- The Woman of Sin (1942)
- The Two Orphans (1942)
- The Countess of Castiglione (1942)
- Harlem (1943)
- The Children Are Watching Us (1944)
- Disturbance (1942)
- No Turning Back (1945)
- Crossroads of Passion (1948)
- The Golden Madonna (1949)
- Miracle in Milan (1951)
- It's Love That's Ruining Me (1951)
- The Adventures of Mandrin (1952)
- The Dream of Zorro (1952)
- The Last Five Minutes (1955)
- Carthage in Flames (1960)

== Bibliography ==
- Poretti, Sergio. Italian Modernisms: Architecture and construction in the twentieth century. Gangemi Editore Spa.
