= Italia Vitaliani =

Italian actress (1866 - 1938)

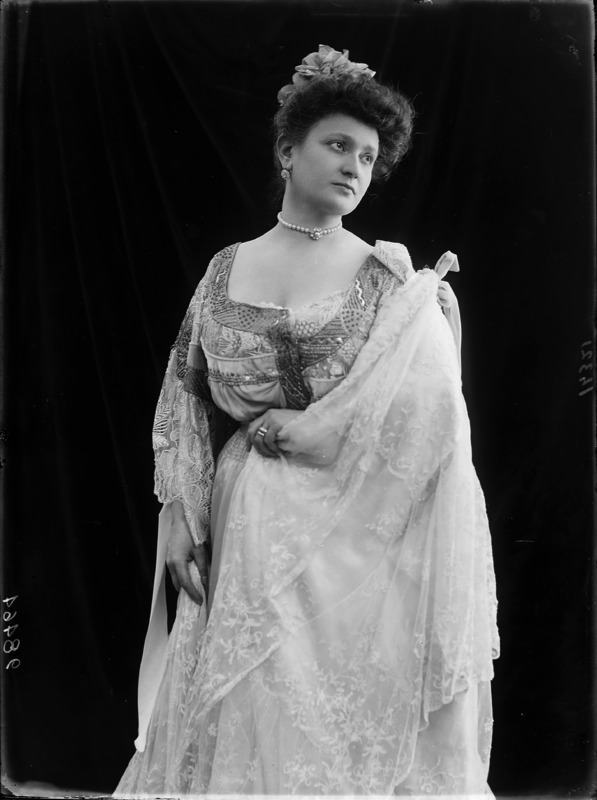
- Born: 20 August 1866; Turin, Italy
- Died: 6 December 1938 (aged 72); Milan, Italy
- Occupation: Actress

Italia Marianna Vitaliani (20 August 1866 – 6 December 1938) was an Italian stage and silent film actress.

== Life and career ==
The daughter of theatrical actors Vitaliano and Elisa Duse and a nephew of famous actress Eleonora Duse, Vitaliani made her stage debut as a child actress in her father's company. In the 1880s she was enrolled as young actress in some important stage companies of the time, such as the ones led by Luigi Bellotti Bon and Francesco Pasta. After becoming first actress in the company directed by Giambattista Marini, in 1892 she formed her own company, with whom she toured for long periods abroad, including in Russia and in South America.

In 1909 she made her film debut in Fedra by Oreste Gherardini. Starting from 1919 she mainly devoted herself to teaching, first at a Florence drama school and later at the Accademia Nazionale di Santa Cecilia. Her late years were difficult, with Vitaliani suffering from depression, as well as from physical and financial problems. In 1931 she founded her own drama school in Milan, where she died a few years later.
