= Backstage (1939 film) =

1939 film

- Directed by: Alessandro Blasetti
- Written by: Alessandro Blasetti; Carlo Duse; Ettore Maria Margadonna; Pietro Germi; Giuseppe Zucca
- Starring: Filippo Romito; Elisa Cegani; Camillo Pilotto
- Cinematography: Václav Vích
- Edited by: Ignazio Ferronetti
- Music by: Alessandro Cicognini
- Production company: Continentalcine
- Distributed by: ENIC
- Release date: 1 November 1939
- Running time: 100 minutes
- Country: Italy
- Language: Italian

Backstage (Italian: Retroscena) is a 1939 Italian comedy film directed by Alessandro Blasetti and starring Filippo Romito, Elisa Cegani and Camillo Pilotto. It is part of the tradition of White Telephone films, popular in Italy during the era.

The film's sets were designed by the art director Gastone Medin. It was shot at Cinecittà in Rome and on location in Naples and Pisa.

== Cast ==
- Filippo Romito as Il baritone Alberto De Sanni
- Elisa Cegani as Diana Martelli - la pianista
- Camillo Pilotto as Parsifal Bernocchio
- Lia Orlandini as Mirna Martelli - la zia di Diana
- Enzo Biliotti as Silvio Dentice
- Ugo Ceseri as Terenzio
- Giovanni Grasso as Il commissario
- Fausto Guerzoni as Il vice commissario
- Ermanno Roveri as Un giornalista
- Romolo Costa as Sablonscky
- Mario Pucci as Il portiere dell'albergo
- Oretta Fiume as La fioraia a bordo
- Cesare Zoppetti as Il portiere dell'uscita degli artisti
- Federico Collino as Il portiere dell'entrata al palcoscenico
- Achille Majeroni as Un signore a bordo
- Sandro Dani as Il funzionario della stazione
- Nino Eller as Il controllore alla stazione
- Nino Crisman as Un cameriere a bordo

== Bibliography ==
- Gundle, Stephen. Mussolini's Dream Factory: Film Stardom in Fascist Italy. Berghahn Books, 2013.
