= 1860 (film) =

1934 film by Alessandro Blasetti

- Directed by: Alessandro Blasetti
- Written by: Emilio Cecchi; Gino Mazzucchi; Alessandro Blasetti
- Produced by: Emilio Cecchi
- Starring: Giuseppe Gulino; Aida Bellia; Gianfranco Giachetti; Mario Ferrari
- Cinematography: Anchise Brizzi; Giulio De Luca
- Edited by: Ignazio Ferronetti; Giacinto Solito; Alessandro Blasetti
- Music by: Nino Medin
- Production company: Società Italiana Cines
- Distributed by: Societa Anonima Stefano Pittaluga
- Release date: 2 April 1934
- Running time: 80 minutes
- Country: Italy
- Language: Italian

1860 is a 1934 Italian historical film directed by Alessandro Blasetti, starring Giuseppe Gulino, Aida Bellia and Gianfranco Giachetti.

The film presages Italian neorealism in that it was shot mainly on location while some scenes were shot at the Cines Studios in Rome. Also, most contemporaneous historical epics used a star to focus on grand historical characters. This film focuses on a character who nobody knows or will ever know, a patriot riding to get the assistance of Giuseppe Garibaldi. This film (in its heralding of neorealism) illustrates how the average man plays a part in grand histories. The film also uses non-actors (a key element of Italian neorealism), a rarity for its time and era.

== Plot ==
The story is the harried attempt of a Sicilian partisan (as part of the Risorgimento) to reach Garibaldi's headquarters in Northern Italy, and to petition the revered revolutionary to rescue part of his besieged land. Along the way, the peasant hero encounters many colorful Italians, differing in class and age, and holding political opinions of every type.

The film ends on the battlefield, making Italian unification a success, despite brutal losses.

== Cast ==
The film includes many non-professional actors, Gianfranco Giachetti (brother of Fosco Giachetti), Maria Denis, and Mario Ferrari. It was the last film of Ugo Gracci. A list of the non-actors includes Giuseppe Gulino, Aida Bellia and many others.

== Scholarly and other interpretation ==
Gabriella Romani, in an Italica article from 2002 (part of the JSTOR arts and sciences complex), writes:

Certainly the film drew upon the Soviet films of Sergei Eisenstein and the Macchiaioli painters, but just as important may be, the "Risorgimento female iconography was produced by nineteenth-century patriotic painters and writers."
