= Elisa Cegani =

Italian actress (1911–1996)

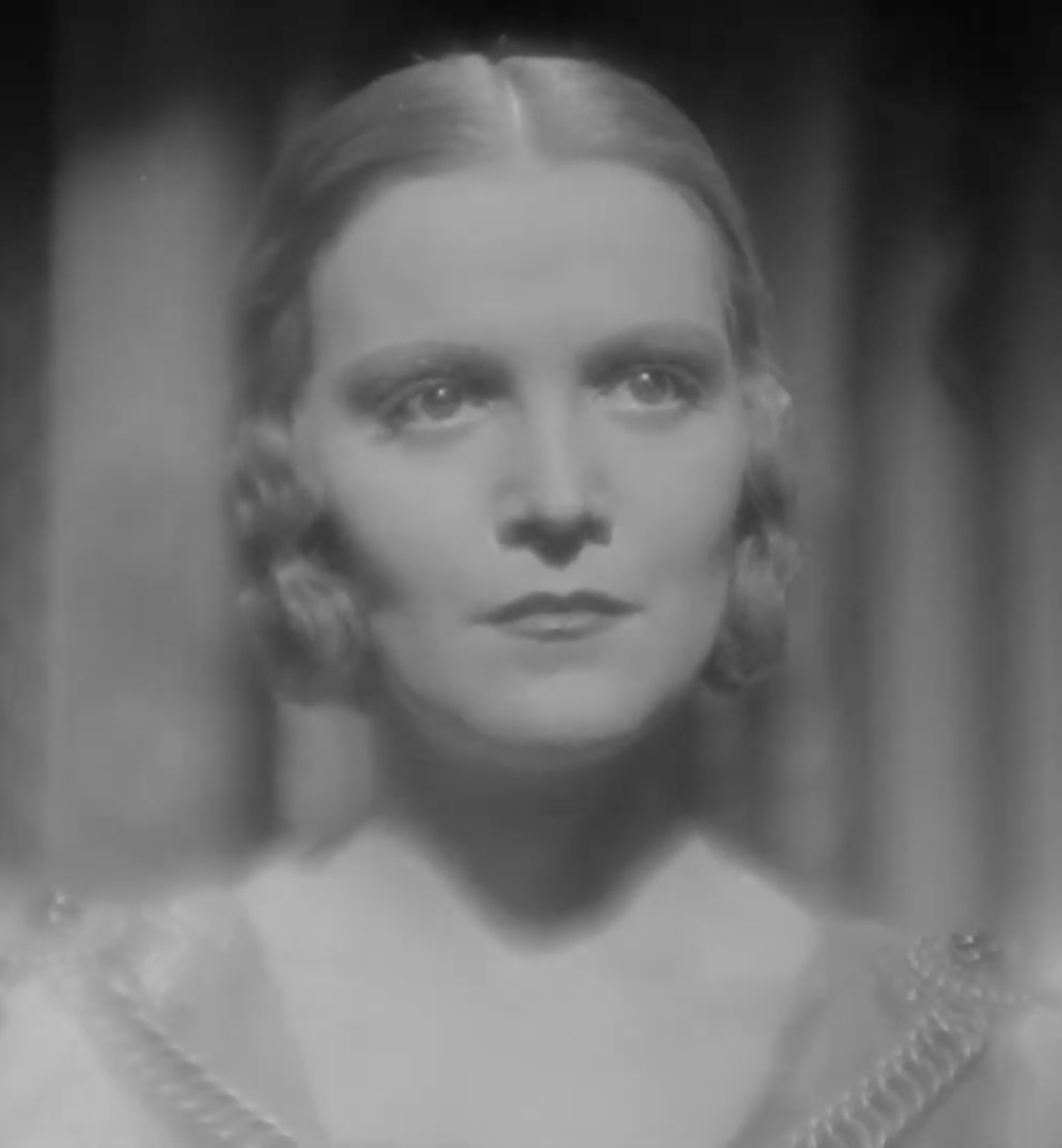
- Cegani in the movie Ettore Fieramosca (1938)
- Born: 11 June 1911; Turin, Kingdom of Italy
- Died: 23 February 1996 (aged 84); Rome, Italy
- Occupation: Actress
- Years active: 1935–1983

Elisa Cegani (11 June 1911 – 23 February 1996) was an Italian actress. She appeared in 60 films between 1935 and 1983.

== Partial filmography ==
- Aldebaran (1935) - Nora Bandi
- Cavalry (1936) - Speranza di Frassineto
- The Countess of Parma (1937) - Marcella
- But It's Nothing Serious (1937) - Gasperina
- Naples of Olden Times (1938) - Maria
- Ettore Fieramosca (1938) - Giovanna di Morreale
- Lancieri di Savoia (1939) - The Daughter
- Backstage (1939) - Diana Martelli - la pianista
- The Iron Crown (1941) - La madre di Elsa & Elsa
- The Jester's Supper (1942) - Laldòmine
- Gioco pericoloso (1942) - Augusta Barrat
- Harlem (1943) - La donna del gangster
- Gente dell'aria (1943) - Elena Sandri
- La carica degli eroi (1943)
- No Turning Back (1945) - Silvia Custo
- The Ten Commandments (1945) - (segment "Non dire falsa testimonianza")
- Un giorno nella vita (1946) - Suor Maria
- Eleonora Duse (1947) - Eleonora Duse
- Monaca di Monza (1947)
- Fabiola (1949) - Sira
- The Glass Castle (1950) - Eléna
- In Olden Days (1952) - Giulia Fabbri (segment "La morsa")
- La fiammata (1952) - Yvonne Stettin
- Fishing School (1952) - Madame Charpentier
- The Enemy (1952) - Duchessa Anna di Nemi
- Prisoner in the Tower of Fire (1952) - Bianca Maltivoglio
- Passionate Song (1953) - Carla Parodi
- A Slice of Life (1954) - Contessa Livia (segment "Scena all'aperto)
- Nel gorgo del peccato (1954) - Margherita Valli
- House of Ricordi (1954) - Giuseppina Strepponi
- A Free Woman (1954) - La signora Giovanna Franci
- The Courier of Moncenisio (1954)
- Loving You Is My Sin (1954) - Countess Danieli - Giorgio's mother
- Graziella (1955) - Madre di Alphonse
- Nana (1955) - Comtesse Muffat
- Lucky to Be a Woman (1956) - Elena Sennetti
- The Doll That Took the Town (1957) - Signora Attenni
- Amore e chiacchiere (Salviamo il panorama) (1958) - Signora Clara Bonelli
- Si le roi savait ça (1958) - Norine
- The Adventures of Nicholas Nickleby (1958, TV series) - Signorina La Creevy
- Ciao, ciao bambina! (1959) - Bice Pavese - la moglie di Filippo
- Constantine and the Cross (1961) - Elena
- The Last Judgment (1961) - Giovanna's mother
- La monaca di Monza (1962) - La Monaca Portinaia
- The Reluctant Saint (1962) - Sister
- Medusa Against the Son of Hercules (1963) - Danae
- Jacob and Esau (1963) - Rebecca - Rebekah
- Liolà (1964) - Aunt Gesa
- Saul and David (1964) - Ahinoam
- Me, Me, Me... and the Others (1966) - Francesca, Peppino's Housekeeper
- Un killer per sua maestà (1968)
- Simón Bolívar (1969) - Conchita Diaz Moreno
- La rosa rossa (1973)
- Languidi baci... perfide carezze (1976) - Clorinda
- Beyond Good and Evil (1977) - Franziska / Fritz's mother
- Tomorrow We Dance (1982) - Mother of Mariangela
