= Just Married (1934 film) =

1934 film

- Directed by: Guido Brignone
- Written by: Aldo De Benedetti; Oreste Biancoli
- Starring: Umberto Melnati; Leda Gloria; Ugo Ceseri
- Cinematography: Ubaldo Arata
- Edited by: Guido Brignone
- Music by: Armando Fragna
- Production company: Societa Anonima Stefano Pittaluga
- Distributed by: Società Italiana Cines
- Release date: 1934
- Running time: 72 minutes
- Country: Italy
- Language: Italian

Just Married (Italian: Oggi sposi) is a 1934 Italian comedy film directed by Guido Brignone and starring Umberto Melnati, Leda Gloria and Ugo Ceseri. It was shot at the Cines Studios in Rome. The film's sets were designed by the art director Guido Fiorini.

== Synopsis ==
A newly married couple from a small town near Como take advantage of a government policy offering new couples a honeymoon in the capital Rome. They enjoy a series of misadventures, and struggle to understand the ways of the city's inhabitants. In one of the most celebrated scenes they win a thoroughbred racehorse which they then have to navigate through the city's traffic.

== Cast ==
- Umberto Melnati as Renzo
- Leda Gloria as Lucia
- Ugo Ceseri
- Giuseppe Porelli
- Marcella Melnati
- Mario Gallina
- Gino Viotti
- Ada Dondini

== Bibliography ==
- Roberto Chiti & Roberto Poppi. I film: Tutti i film italiani dal 1930 al 1944. Gremese Editore, 2005.
- Mancini, Elaine. Struggles of the Italian film industry during fascism, 1930-1935. UMI Research Press, 1985.
