= Mario Ferrari =

Italian actor (1894–1974)

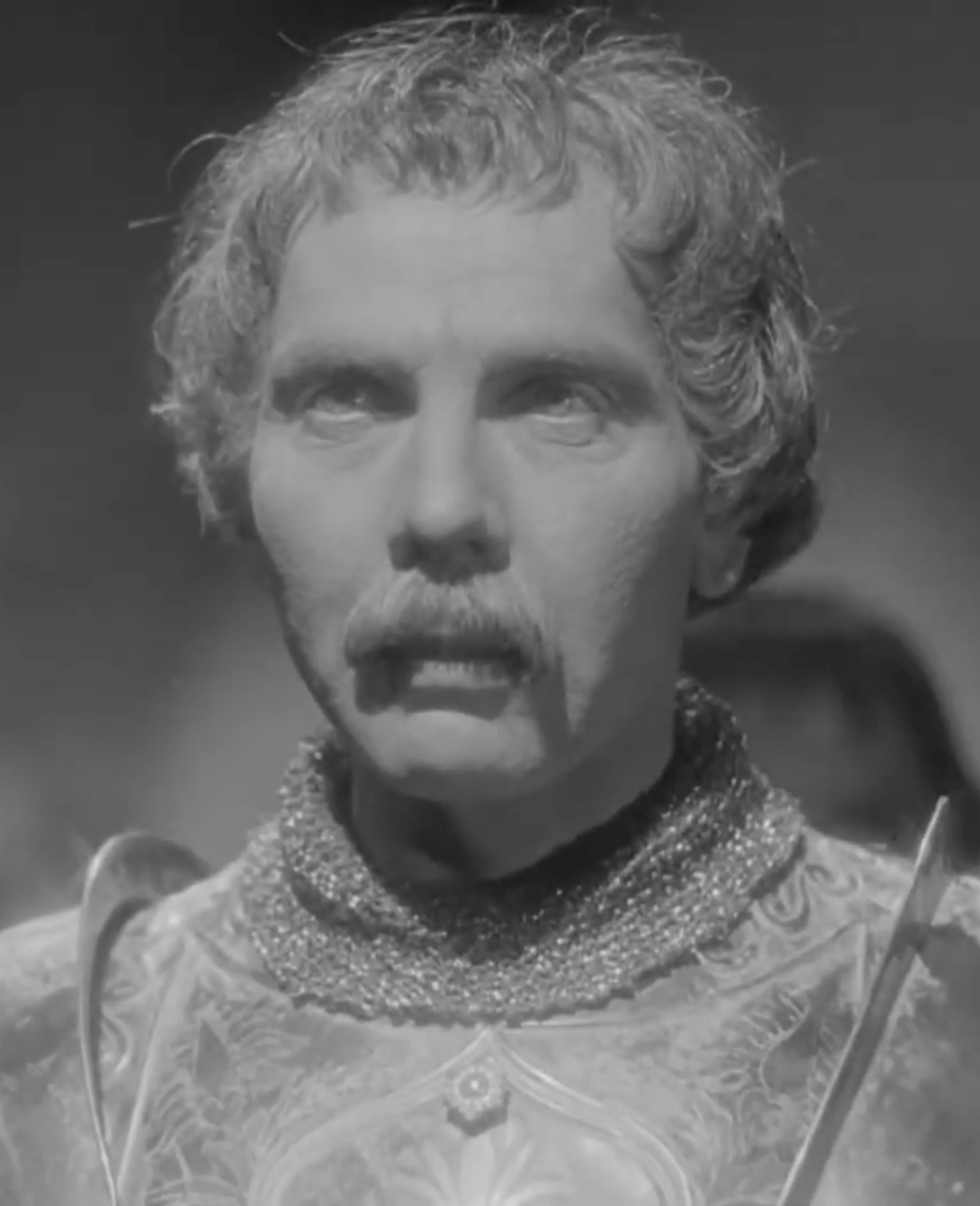
- Ferrari in Ettore Fieramosca (1938)
- Born: September 3, 1894; Rome, Lazio; Italy
- Died: June 28, 1974 (aged 79); Rome, Lazio; Italy
- Occupation: Actor
- Years active: 1920–1974

Mario Ferrari (September 3, 1894 – June 28, 1974) was an Italian film actor. After making his debut in 1920, Ferrari became a mainstay of Italian cinema during the Fascist era appearing in a mixture of leading and supporting roles. He played the villainous Graiano d'Asti in the historical film Ettore Fieramosca (1938). Ferrari continued to work regularly in the post-Second World War years.

== Selected filmography ==
- Il milione (1920)
- Il rosso e il nero (1920)
- Castello dalle cinquantasette lampade (1920)
- L'isola scomparsa (1921)
- Palio (1932) - Bachicche
- The Table of the Poor (1932) - Attorney Volterra
- Your Money or Your Life (1932)
- 1860 (1933) - Colonel Carini
- Villafranca (1934)
- L'impiegata di papà (1934) - Capoufficio
- The Little Schoolmistress (1934) - Giacomo Macchia
- Everybody's Woman (1934) - Il produttore cinamatografico
- La città dell'amore (1934)
- Red Passport (1935) - Don Pablo Ramirez
- Lorenzino de' Medici (1935) - Ser Maurizio
- A Woman Between Two Worlds (1936) - Il dottor Lawburn
- Cavalry (1936) - Alberto Ponza
- The Anonymous Roylott (1936)
- King of Diamonds (1936) - Conte Fabrizio di Grottaferrata
- Condottieri (1937) - Cesare Borgia
- Queen of the Scala (1937) - Candido Ponti
- Marcella (1937)
- But It's Nothing Serious (1937)
- The Count of Brechard (1938) - Socrate
- Luciano Serra, Pilot (1938) - Il colonnello Franco Morelli
- Pride (1938) - Il banchiere castoldi
- Ettore Fieramosca (1938) - Graiano d'Asti
- The Knight of San Marco (1939) - Daniele Orsenigo
- No Man's Land (1939) - Pietro Gori
- Traversata nera (1939) - Bruce Brook, il commissario di bordo
- Cardinal Messias (1939) - Abuna Atanasio
- The Thrill of the Skies (1940) - L'aviatore
- L'uomo della legione (1940) - Mario Ristorni
- La última falla (1940) - Juan José
- The Sinner (1940) - Nino Bandelli, fratello di Pietro
- Piccolo alpino (1940) - Il capitano Lupo
- Il cavaliere senza nome (1941) - L'ambasciatore di Genova
- Il vetturale del San Gottardo (1941) - Favre
- Divieto di sosta (1941)
- Giungla (1942) - Il professore Foster
- Giarabub (1942) - Il capitano Del Grande
- Redemption (1943) - Il segretario del fascio
- Tempesta sul golfo (1943) - Generale Nunziante
- Men of the Mountain (1943) - Il capitano Piero Sandri
- La storia di una capinera (1943) - Il padre di Maria
- All'ombra della gloria (1945) - Il commissario della polizia borbonica
- The Ten Commandments (1945)
- La carne e l'anima (1947) - Mattia, il padre di Katrin
- Life of Donizetti (1947) - Il feldmaresciallo von Wallenburg
- Vanity (1947)
- The White Devil (1947) - Prof. Ilya
- Il principe ribelle (1947)
- I cavalieri dalle maschere nere (1948) - Conte Raimondo de la Motte
- Anthony of Padua (1949) - Il giudice Don Alicante
- Flying Squadron (1949) - Gen. Artesi
- Torment (1950) - L'avvocato Bianchi
- Women Without Names (1950) - Captain / Camp Commander
- Cavalcade of Heroes (1950) - Generale Odivot
- The Lion of Amalfi (1950)
- Feathers in the Wind (1950) - Frassoni
- Strano appuntamento (1950)
- The Black Captain (1951) - Duca Fabrizzio Di Corvara
- Verginità (1951)
- Senza bandiera (1951)
- Falsehood (1952) - Il padre di Mariella
- The Queen of Sheba (1952) - Chaldis, High Priest of Sheba
- Who Is Without Sin (1952) - John Morresi
- Brothers of Italy (1952) - Comandante nave italiana
- Storms (1953) - Il prefetto
- Noi peccatori (1953) - L'avvocato Rinaldi
- Lulu (1953) - Mister Franchi
- Madonna delle rose (1953) - Commissario
- The Pagans (1953) - Bishop Ghiberti
- Verdi, the King of Melody (1953) - Ufficiale Austriaco (uncredited)
- Il conte Aquila (1955) - Vitaliano Confalonieri
- The Angel of the Alps (1957) - conte Roverbella
- Goliath and the Dragon (1960, screenplay)
- The Avenger (1962) - Latino - King of Latium
- Me, Me, Me... and the Others (1966)

== Bibliography ==
- Landy, Marcia. The Folklore of Consensus: Theatricality in the Italian Cinema, 1930-1943. SUNY Press, 1998.
