= The Old Guard (1934 film) =

1934 film by Alessandro Blasetti

- Directed by: Alessandro Blasetti
- Written by: Livio Apolloni; Giuseppe Zucca; Alessandro Blasetti
- Starring: Gianfranco Giachetti; Mino Doro; Franco Brambilla; Maria Puccini
- Cinematography: Otello Martelli
- Edited by: Ignazio Ferronetti; Alessandro Blasetti
- Music by: Umberto Mancini
- Production company: Fauno Film
- Distributed by: Filmimpero
- Release date: 1934
- Running time: 91 minutes
- Country: Italy
- Language: Italian

The Old Guard (Italian: Vecchia guardia) is a 1934 Italian drama film directed by Alessandro Blasetti and starring Gianfranco Giachetti, Mino Doro, and Franco Brambilla. It was one of several pro-Fascist films made by Blasetti during the era. The film is set in a small Italian town in 1922, where a local group of Fascist blackshirts battle against rival socialists who have called a strike at the hospital. Mario, the young son of Doctor Cardini, is killed in the fighting. The film ends with the March on Rome that brought Benito Mussolini to power.

Although intended as sympathetic to the regime, and the methods by which it came to power, the film was not popular with the Fascist hierarchy who felt its portrayal of violence undermined the respectable image the National Fascist Party was now trying to cultivate.

== Cast ==
- Gianfranco Giachetti as Dott. Claudio Cardini
- Mino Doro as Roberto
- Franco Brambilla as Mario
- Maria Puccini as La moglie
- Barbara Monis as La maestra
- Graziella Antonelli as La sorella della maestra
- Ugo Ceseri as Marcone
- Umberto Sacripante as Il pazzo Tralicò
- Graziela Betti as La ragazza del convento
- Gino Viotti as Il sindaco
- Cesare Zoppetti as L'assessore
- Aristide Garbini as L'uscere
- Italo Tancredi as L'infermiere
- Andrea Checchi as Pompeo
- Ugo Sasso as Uno squadrista

== Bibliography ==
- Gundle, Stephen. Mussolini's Dream Factory: Film Stardom in Fascist Italy. Berghahn Books, 2013.
- Moliterno, Gino. Historical Dictionary of Italian Cinema. Scarecrow Press, 2008.
