= Ugo Ceseri =

Italian actor (1893–1940)

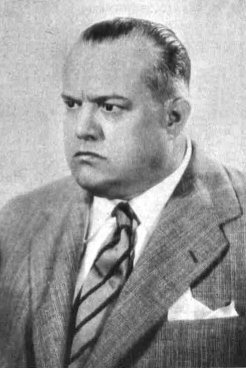
- Born: 30 June 1893; Florence, Tuscany; Italy
- Died: 3 December 1940 (aged 47); Rome, Lazio; Italy
- Occupation: Actor
- Years active: 1931–1940

Ugo Ceseri (30 June 1893 – 3 December 1940) was an Italian stage and film actor. He appeared in forty two films between 1931 and his death in 1940. In 1934 he appeared in the play 18 BL, an attempt to create a mass theatre by the Fascist government of Italy. The play was directed by Alessandro Blasetti and featured 2,000 amateur actors.

== Selected filmography ==
- Figaro and His Great Day (1931)
- Palio (1931)
- The Opera Singer (1932)
- The Old Lady (1932)
- One Night with You (1932)
- Model Wanted (1933)
- The Haller Case (1933)
- Seconda B (1934)
- The Old Guard (1934)
- Unripe Fruit (1934)
- Just Married (1934)
- Red Passport (1935)
- Ginevra degli Almieri (1935)
- Aldebaran (1935)
- Music in the Square (1936)
- The Dance of Time (1936)
- Beggar's Wedding (1936)
- But It's Nothing Serious (1936)
- The Two Sergeants (1936)
- The Countess of Parma (1936)
- The Carnival Is Here Again (1937)
- The Castiglioni Brothers (1937)
- The Count of Brechard (1938)
- The Cuckoo Clock (1938)
- Backstage (1939)
- Father For a Night (1939)
- Un'avventura di Salvator Rosa (1940)

== Bibliography ==
- Balfour, Michael. Theatre and War, 1933-1945: Performance in Extremis. Berghahn Books, 2001.
