= Camillo Pilotto =

Italian actor

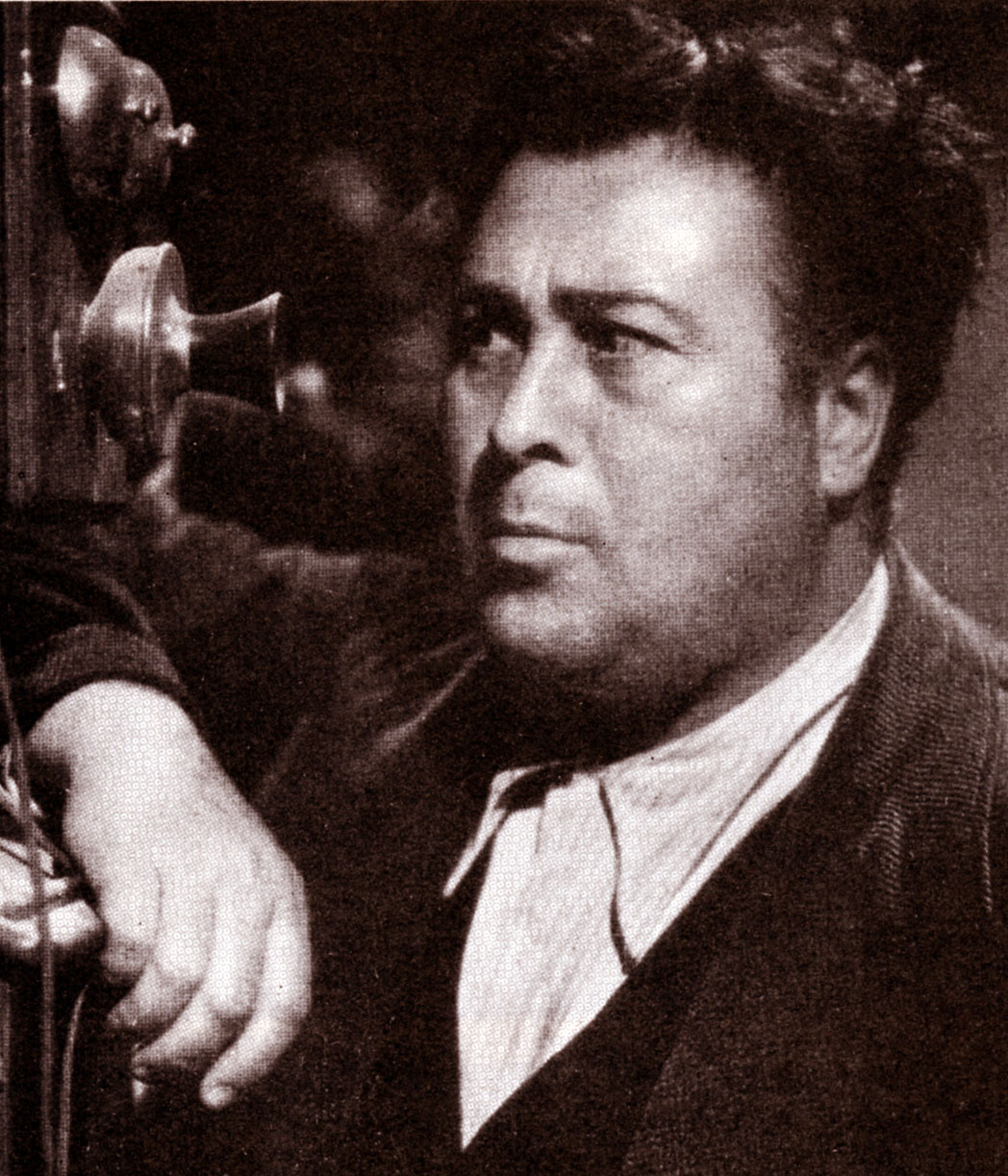
- Born: 6 February 1888; Rome, Italy
- Died: 27 May 1963 (aged 75); Rome, Italy
- Occupation: Actor

Camillo Pilotto (6 February 1888 – 27 May 1963) was an Italian film actor. He appeared in 101 films between 1916 and 1963. He was born and died in Rome, Italy.

== Selected filmography ==
- The Song of Love (1930)
- The Old Lady (1932)
- Five to Nil (1932)
- The Telephone Operator (1932)
- Three Lucky Fools (1933)
- The Haller Case (1933)
- Everybody's Secretary (1933)
- Port (1934)
- The Matchmaker (1934)
- Full Speed (1934)
- Sette giorni all'altro mondo (1936)
- The Great Appeal (1936)
- The Anonymous Roylott (1936)
- Scipio Africanus: The Defeat of Hannibal (1937)
- The Last Days of Pompeo (1937)
- The Make Believe Pirates (1937)
- The Three Wishes (1937)
- The Two Misanthropists (1937)
- The Castiglioni Brothers, (1937)
- Pietro Micca (1938)
- Giuseppe Verdi (1938)
- All of Life in One Night (1938)
- The Count of Brechard (1938)
- Cardinal Messias (1939)
- Backstage (1939)
- The Sons of the Marquis Lucera (1939)
- The Hotel of the Absent (1939)
- Beyond Love (1940)
- The Sinner (1940)
- The Daughter of the Green Pirate (1940)
- Abandonment (1940)
- The Secret Lover (1941)
- The Adventuress from the Floor Above (1941)
- The Gorgon (1942)
- Fourth Page (1942)
- A Living Statue (1943)
- A Little Wife (1943)
- Redemption (1943)
- The Innkeeper (1944)
- Fury (1947)
- Bullet for Stefano (1947)
- The Courier of the King (1947)
- Alina (1950)
- Cavalcade of Heroes (1950)
- Mistress of the Mountains (1950)
- Pact with the Devil (1950)
- The Last Days of Pompeii (1950)
- Abbiamo vinto! (1951)
- Without a Flag (1951)
- Messalina (1951)
- Black Feathers (1952)
- Giovinezza (1952)
- The Three Thieves (1954)
- Schiava del peccato (1954)
- Casta Diva (1954)
- The Prince with the Red Mask (1955)
- The Goddess of Love (1957)
- Head of a Tyrant (1959)
