= Mino Doro =

Italian film actor (1903–1992)

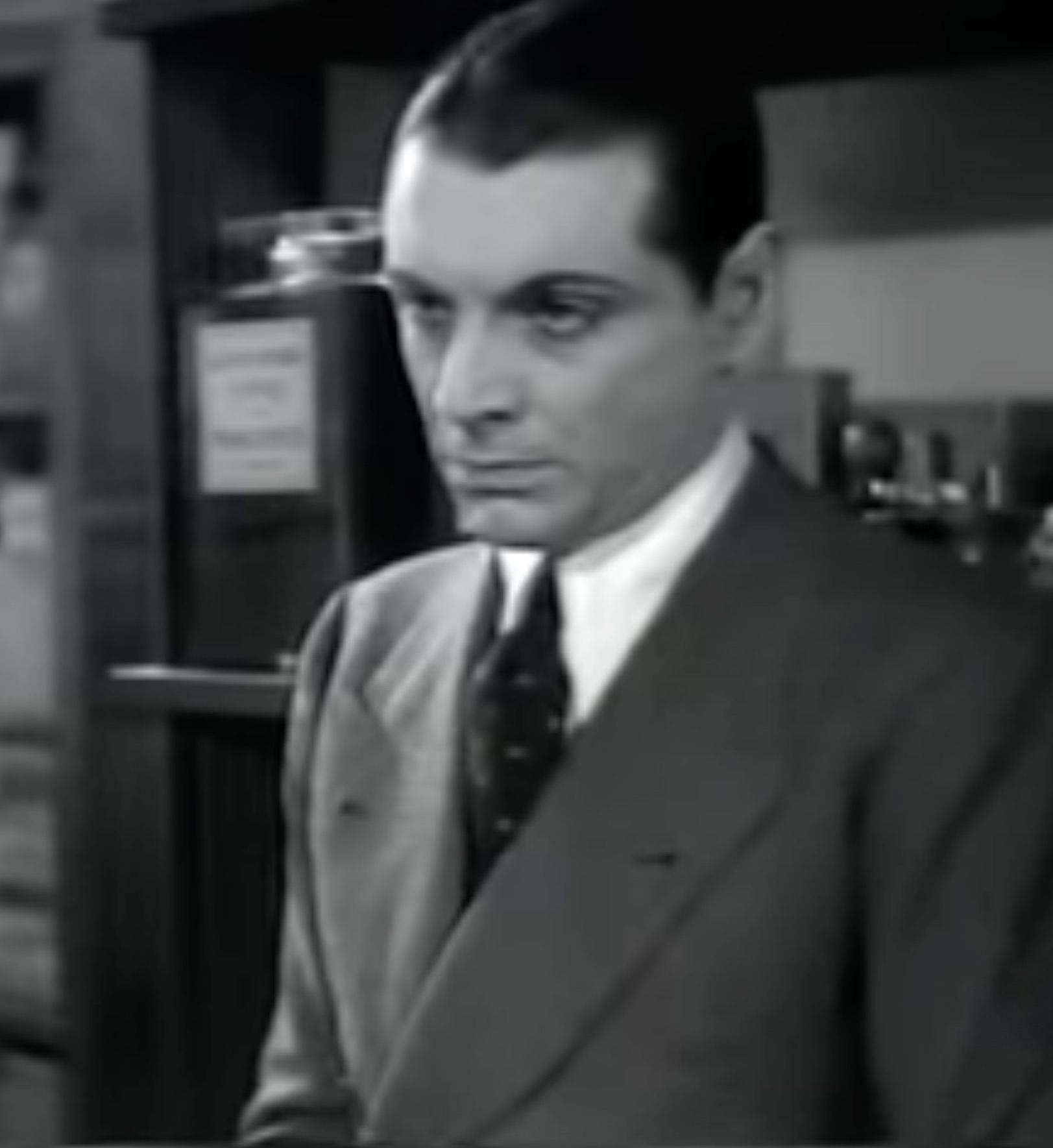
- Doro in T'amerò sempre (1933)
- Born: 6 May 1903; Venice, Kingdom of Italy
- Died: 13 April 1992 (aged 88); Marino, Lazio, Italy
- Occupation: Actor
- Years active: 1932–1970

Mino Doro (6 May 1903 – 13 April 1992) was an Italian actor who appeared in more than a hundred films between 1932 and 1970. Doro generally played supporting and character roles. He appeared as a blackshirt in the 1934 Fascist propaganda film The Old Guard.

In popular magazines of the 1930s, Doro was portrayed as the Italian equivalent of the American actor Clark Gable.

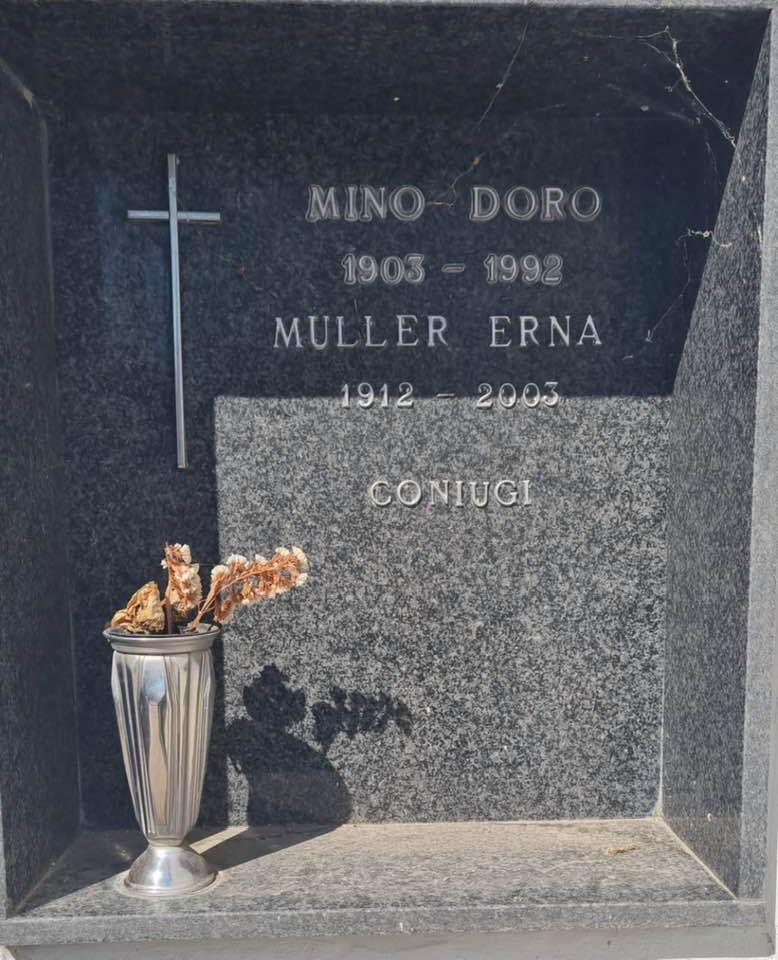
Tomb of Mino Doro in the monumental cemetery of Marino

== Selected filmography ==
- The Last Adventure (1932)
- I'll Always Love You (1933) - Il conte Diego
- Fanny (1933) - Mario
- The Missing Treaty (1933) - Carlo - suo figlio
- Cento di questi giorni (1933) - Guglielmo
- The Old Guard (1934) - Roberto
- Tenebre (1934) - Emerson
- Lady of Paradise (1934) - Delfo Delfi
- Quella vecchia canaglia (1934) - Giovanni
- La fanciulla dell'altro mondo (1934) - Rigo
- Music in the Square (1936)
- The Two Sergeants (1936) - Il sergente Roberto Magni
- The Anonymous Roylott (1936)
- Doctor Antonio (1937) - Prospero
- Marcella (1937) - Renato
- Pietro Micca (1938) - Il colonello Brunet
- All of Life in One Night (1938) - Giorgio
- The Make Believe Pirates (1939)
- Piccolo hotel (1939) - Gregory Bauer
- Hurricane in the Tropics (1939) - Nichols
- Ho visto brillare le stelle (1939) - Topini
- Il segreto di Villa Paradiso (1940) - L'ispettore Gabriel Lopez
- Cuori nella tormenta (1940) - Piero Trentin
- Il re d'Inghilterra non paga (1941) - Il primo Antellesi
- Don Buonaparte (1941) - Il caporale
- Una notte dopo l'opera (1942) - Paolo Marini
- Il ponte sull'infinito (1942) - Sandro
- Redemption (1943) - Carlo
- Harlem (1943) - Bill Black
- Special Correspondents (1943) - Il giornalista Prosperi
- Non mi muovo! (1943) - Enrico Sanni, il padrone di casa
- No Turning Back (1945) - Dino Rizzi
- Monte Miracolo (1945) - Corrado Conti
- Si chiude all'alba (1945) - Il proprietario del tabarin
- The Bandit (1946) - Mirko
- Les beaux jours du roi Murat (1947) - Maghella - ministre de la police
- My Beautiful Daughter (1950) - Guidi
- Margaret of Cortona (1950) - Capitano del popolo
- Revenge of a Crazy Girl (1951) - Rodolfo
- What Price Innocence? (1952) - Massimo Artesi
- Guilt Is Not Mine (1952) - Archeologo
- Il prezzo dell'onore (1952) - Don Nicola
- The Man from Cairo (1953) - Major C. Blanc
- Frine, Courtesan of Orient (1953) - Osco
- My Life Is Yours (1953) - Il medico
- Angels of Darkness (1954)
- Il seduttore (1954)
- A Parisian in Rome (1954) - Maestro Manardi
- L'eterna femmina (1954)
- Tripoli, Beautiful Land of Love (1954) - L'eccelenza
- I cavalieri dell'illusione (1954)
- A Hero of Our Times (1955) - Prof. Bracci
- Accadde al penitenziario (1955) - Un automobilista in lite
- La ladra (1955) - Maestro Arrighi (uncredited)
- Faccia da mascalzone (1956)
- Guardia, guardia scelta, brigadiere e maresciallo (1956) - The Colonel as an Examiner
- War and Peace (1956) - Russian General (uncredited)
- Difendo il mio amore (1956)
- Nero's Weekend (1956) - Corbulone
- Allow Me, Daddy! (1956) - Il maestro Santini
- Count Max (1957) - Maj. Guido Amador
- C'è un sentiero nel cielo (1957) - Figueros, the notary public
- Ladro lui, ladra lei (1958) - Gaetano Accursio
- Slave Women of Corinth (1958) - Crepilo
- The Last Days of Pompeii (1959) - Roman Consul
- Ben-Hur (1959) - Valerius Gratus (uncredited)
- Legions of the Nile (1959) - Domiziano
- Gastone (1960) - Cavallini
- La Dolce Vita (1960) - Amante di Nadia
- Messalina (1960) - Suplicio
- Everybody Go Home (1960) - Maggiore Nocella
- Il corazziere (1960) - Il federale
- Rome 1585 (1961)
- Hercules and the Conquest of Atlantis (1961) - Oraclo
- Duel of Champions (1961) - Caius
- Hercules in the Haunted World (1961) - Keros
- A Difficult Life (1961) - Gino Laganà - Silvio's Friend
- The Police Commissioner (1962) - Col. Di Pietro
- Two Weeks in Another Town (1962) - Tucino
- The Reluctant Saint (1962)
- I Don Giovanni della Costa Azzurra (1962) - Marito di Jasmine
- 8½ (1963) - L'agente di Claudia
- Duel at the Rio Grande (1963) - Don Luis
- Rocambole (1963) - L'avocat de Chateau Medy
- Il successo (1963)
- Rome Against Rome (1964) - Lutetius
- Il treno del sabato (1964) - Pallante's friend
- Panic Button (1964)
- Sandokan to the Rescue (1964) - Lumbo
- Sandokan Against the Leopard of Sarawak (1964) - Lumbo
- La mia signora (1964) - The mayor (segment "Eritrea")
- Male Companion (1964) - Le professeur Gaetano (uncredited)
- I due pericoli pubblici (1964) - Giorgio's Father
- Golia alla conquista di Bagdad (1965) - King Selim
- The Adventurer of Tortuga (1965) - Tarsarios
- Juliet of the Spirits (1965) - Player (uncredited)
- Operation Atlantis (1965) - Solis
- Fantômas se déchaîne (1965) - Le professeur suisse
- Super Seven Calling Cairo (1965) - Il Professore
- The Upper Hand (1966)
- The Mona Lisa Has Been Stolen (1966)
- To Skin a Spy (1966)
- La grande sauterelle (1967) - L'homme au bracelet de diamants
- Action Man (1967) - Luigi Savani
- Golden Chameleon (1967) - Guglielmo
- The Rover (1967) - Dussard
- Untamable Angelique (1967) - Auction director (uncredited)
- Angelique and the Sultan (1968) - (uncredited)
- 3 Supermen a Tokio (1968) - Jacob Ferré
- How Did a Nice Girl Like You Get Into This Business? (1970) - Anwalt
- Hornets' Nest (1970) - Italian Doctor (final film role)

== Bibliography ==
- Forgacs, David & Gundle, Stephen. Mass Culture and Italian Society from Fascism to the Cold War. Indiana University Press, 2007.
- Landy, Marcia. The Folklore of Consensus: Theatricality in the Italian Cinema, 1930–1943. SUNY Press, 1998.
