= Nino Besozzi =

Italian actor (1901–1971)

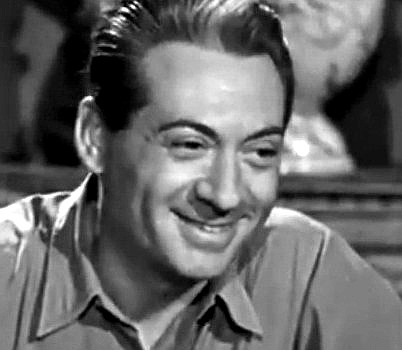
- Nino Besozzi in Down with Misery (1945).
- Born: 6 February 1901; Milan, Italy
- Died: 2 February 1971 (aged 69); Milan, Italy
- Occupation: Actor
- Years active: 1931–1970

Nino Besozzi (6 February 1901 – 2 February 1971) was an Italian film actor. He appeared in more than 50 films between 1931 and 1970. He was born in and died in Milan, Italy.

== Life and career ==
After graduating in accountancy, Besozzi made his acting debut in the Irma Gramatica's theatre company. In a short time he became popular as a brilliant actor, working with some of the biggest stage names of the time, including Ruggero Ruggeri, Vittorio De Sica, Dario Niccodemi, Andreina Pagnani, Dina Galli, Sarah Ferrati, Armando Falconi, Enrico Viarisio, Ernesto Almirante. He had his cinema breakout in The Private Secretary (1931), and got numerous leading roles in the Fascist-era popular genre Telefoni Bianchi; after the war he was mainly active as a comedic character actor. In the early 1950s he got a large personal success on stage with the comedy play Siamo tutti milanesi. He also worked on radio and television. He died of a cerebral thrombosis shortly before his 70th birthday.

== Partial filmography ==
- The Private Secretary (1931) - Il banchiere Roberto Berri
- One Night with You (1932) - Il giovine scapolo
- Paradise (1932) - Max
- Non son gelosa (1933) - Gianni Berti
- I'll Always Love You (1933) - Mario Fabbrini
- Non c'è bisogno di denaro (1933) - Paolo
- Il presidente della Ba.Ce.Cre.Mi. (1933) - Ingegnere Rossi
- Model Wanted (1933) - Alberto Bacci
- Kiki (1934) - Raimondo
- Unripe Fruit (1934) - Giorgio Verni
- Il serpente a sonagli (1935) - Franz - l'ispettore di polizia
- Thirty Seconds of Love (1936) - Piero Gualandi
- To Live (1936) - Mario Deli
- Nina non far la stupida (1937) - Momoleto
- The Two Misanthropists (1937) - Damiano Bertelet
- Like the Leaves (1938) - Max
- Amicizia (1938) - Giovanni Salvatori
- The Lady in White (1938) - Giulio Gualandi
- We Were Seven Sisters (1939) - Leonardo Varani
- I've Lost My Husband! (1939) - Conte Giuliano Arenzi
- Mille chilometri al minuto (1939) - Guido Renzi
- La danza dei milioni (1940) - Gustavo Wiesinger
- Barbablù (1941) - Il conte Juan de Sezka
- Non mi sposo più (1942) - Roland
- La signorina (1942) - Francesco Roero
- Rossini (1942) - Gioacchino Rossini
- The Little Teacher (1942) - Il sindaco
- La maschera e il volto (1943) - Il conte Paolo Grazia
- Tre ragazze cercano marito (1944) - Il professore Ottavio
- Merry Chase (1945) - Andrea, il marito
- Down with Misery (1945) - Giovanni Straselli, suo marito
- Vanity (1947)
- Lo sciopero dei milioni (1947)
- Be Seeing You, Father (1948) - Tetriaca
- Accadde al penitenziario (1955) - Prof. Zaccanti
- L'ultimo amante (1955) - Il dottor Moriesi
- Destination Piovarolo (1955) - Il ministro dei transporti
- Lucky to Be a Woman (1956) - Paolo Magnano
- Porta un bacione a Firenze (1956) - Il conte Pineschi
- Classe di ferro (1957) - Editore Martelli
- Vacanze a Ischia (1957) - Guido Lucarelli
- The Law Is the Law (1958) - Le maréchal des carabiniers / Il Maresciallo
- Wild Cats on the Beach (1959) - Carsoli
- Walter e i suoi cugini (1961) - Commendator Spallanzoni
- Whisky a mezzogiorno (1962)
- Pardon, Are You For or Against? (1966) - Camillo Tasca
- Il terribile ispettore (1969) - Presidente Eial
- See You in Hell, Friends (1970/1990) - Colonel
