= Leda Gloria =

Italian actress (1908–1997)

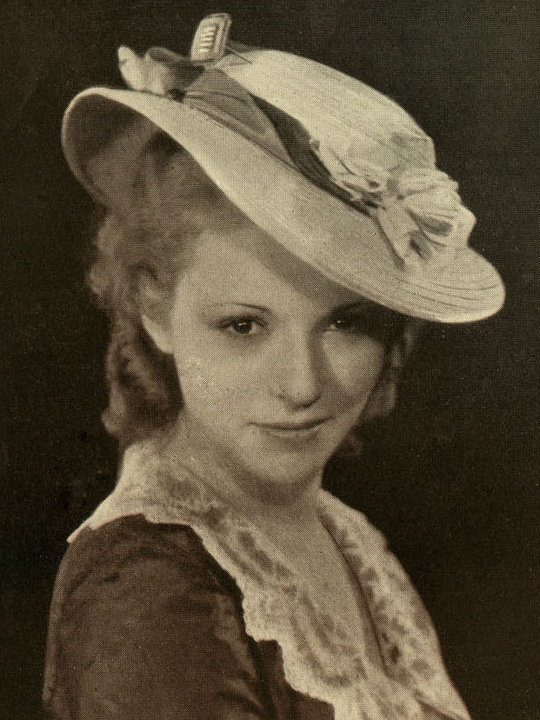
- Gloria in 1941
- Born: Leda Nicoletti; 30 August 1908; Rome, Kingdom of Italy
- Died: 16 March 1997 (aged 88); Rome, Italy
- Occupation: Actress
- Years active: 1929–1965

Leda Gloria (30 August 1908 – 16 March 1997) was an Italian film actress. She appeared in 66 films between 1929 and 1965. During the expansion of Italian cinema of the Fascist era of the 1930s and early 1940s she appeared in starring roles, later transitioning into character parts after the Second World War. She appeared in the Don Camillo series of films, playing the wife of Gino Cervi's Giuseppe Bottazzi.

== Selected filmography ==
- Girls Do Not Joke (1929)
- There Is a Woman Who Never Forgets You (1930)
- Ninna nanna delle dodici mamme (1930)
- Mother Earth (1931) – Emilia
- Figaro and His Great Day (1931) – Nina
- Palio (1932) – Fiora
- The Table of the Poor (1932) – Giorgina Fusaro
- The Blue Fleet (1932) – Olga Rosati
- The Missing Treaty (1933) – Anna – sua figlia
- The Three-Cornered Hat (1935) – Carmela, moglie di Luca
- Territorial Militia (1936) – Martina
- Beggar's Wedding (1936) – Diana
- Just Married (1936) – Lucia
- Sette giorni all'altro mondo (1936) – Elena Santarelli
- The Ambassador (1936)
- King of Diamonds (1936)
- The Three Wishes (1937) – Dora Corelli, la cantante
- Bayonet (1938)
- Duetto vagabondo (1939) – La vedova
- The Marquis of Ruvolito (1939) – Lily Gordon
- La grande luce - Montevergine (1939) – Sabina
- L'aria del continente (1939)
- The Palace on the River (1940)
- Antonio Meucci (1940) – Ester Meucci, sua moglie
- The Cavalier from Kruja (1940) – Alidjé
- Lucky Night (1941) – La sorella del principale
- The Black Panther (1942) – Sonya Harkaneck
- Souls in Turmoil (1942) – Anna
- La signorina (1942)
- Dagli Appennini alle Ande (1943) – Maria Ansaldi, sua madre
- Redenzione (1943)
- La moglie in castigo (1943)
- Vietato ai minorenni (1944)
- The Mill on the Po (1949) – La Sniza
- Ring Around the Clock (1950) – Rosa
- Side Street Story (1950) – Amalia, la moglie di Gennaro
- Strano appuntamento (1950) – Signora Rossi
- Last Meeting (1951) – Bianca, amica di Lina
- Red Moon (1951) – Donna Amalia (uncredited)
- Three Girls from Rome (1952) – Rosa, Elena's mother
- The Little World of Don Camillo (1952) – Madame Botazzi
- The Eternal Chain (1952) – Donna Teresa, madre di Maria
- Ergastolo (1952) – Rosa Lulli
- Rosalba, la fanciulla di Pompei (1952) – House Neighbour
- The Baker of Valorgue (1953) – Mme Zanetti, l'épicière
- It's Never Too Late (1953) – Anna Colussi
- The Return of Don Camillo (1953) – Signora Bottazzi
- It Happened in the Park (1953) – Signora Ventrella – la moglie di Donato (segment: Il paraninfo)
- Cuore di mamma (1954) – Donna Elvira
- Tragic Ballad (1954) – Signora Barone
- The Boatman of Amalfi (1954) – Rita Selva
- New Moon (1955) – madre di Giovanni
- Don Camillo's Last Round (1955) – Madame Botazzi
- Torna piccina mia! (1955) – Esther
- The Virtuous Bigamist (1956) – Lucia – la mère de Maria
- Amaramente (1956) – Madre di Marco
- Ciao, pais... (1956) – Amala
- Guendalina (1957) – Madre di Oberdan
- Serenata a Maria (1957) – Pupella's and Maria's mother
- Il cocco di mamma (1958) – Aldo Manca's Mother
- The Law Is the Law (1958) – Antonietta La Paglia
- La sposa (1958) – Susanna
- The Woman of Ice (1960) – Zia Agata
- Cocagne (1961) – Mélanie
- Don Camillo: Monsignor (1961) – Madame Botazzi
- Don Camillo in Moscow (1965) – Madame Botazzi
