= Alessandro Blasetti =

Italian film director

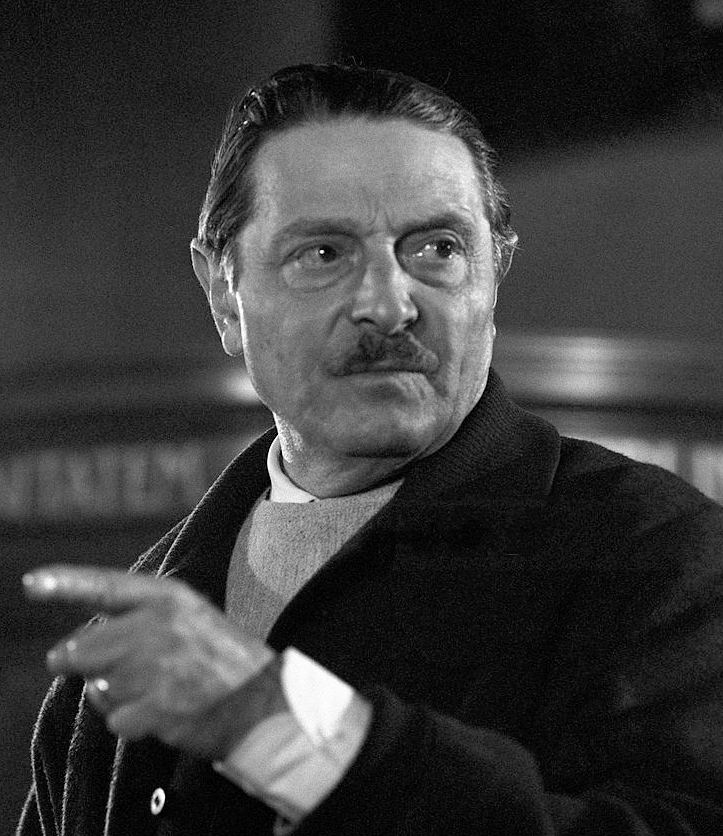
- Blasetti in 1965
- Born: 3 July 1900; Rome, Kingdom of Italy
- Died: 1 February 1987 (aged 86); Rome, Italy
- Occupation: Film director
- Years active: 1917–1981

Signature
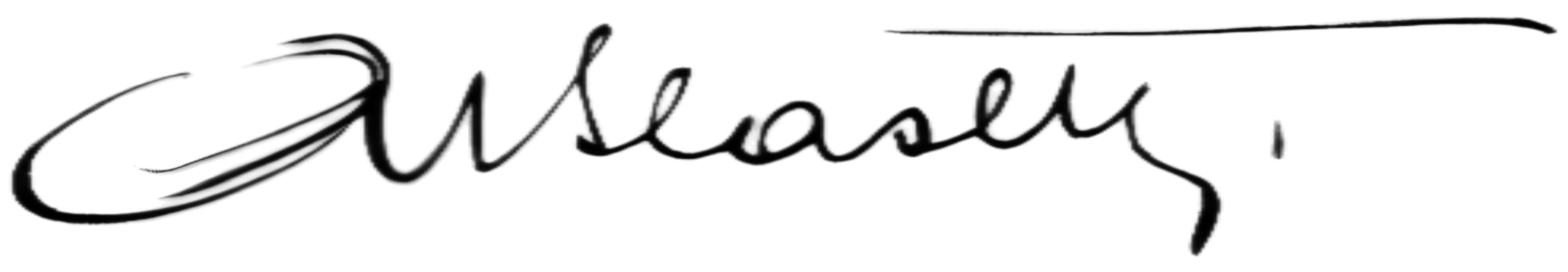

Alessandro Blasetti (3 July 1900 – 1 February 1987) was an Italian film director and screenwriter who influenced Italian neorealism with the film Four Steps in the Clouds. Blasetti was one of the leading figures in Italian cinema during the Fascist era. He is sometimes known as the "father of Italian cinema" because of his role in reviving the struggling industry in the late 1920s.

== Early life ==
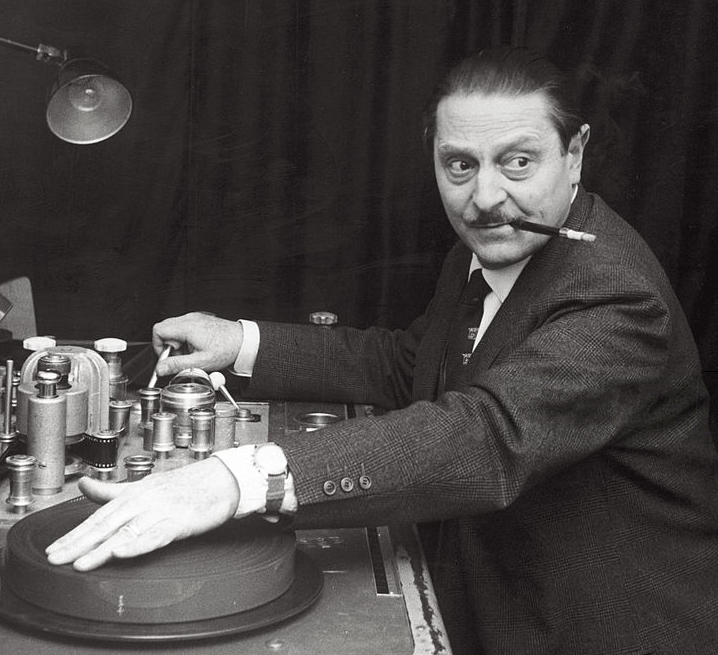
Blasetti in 1954

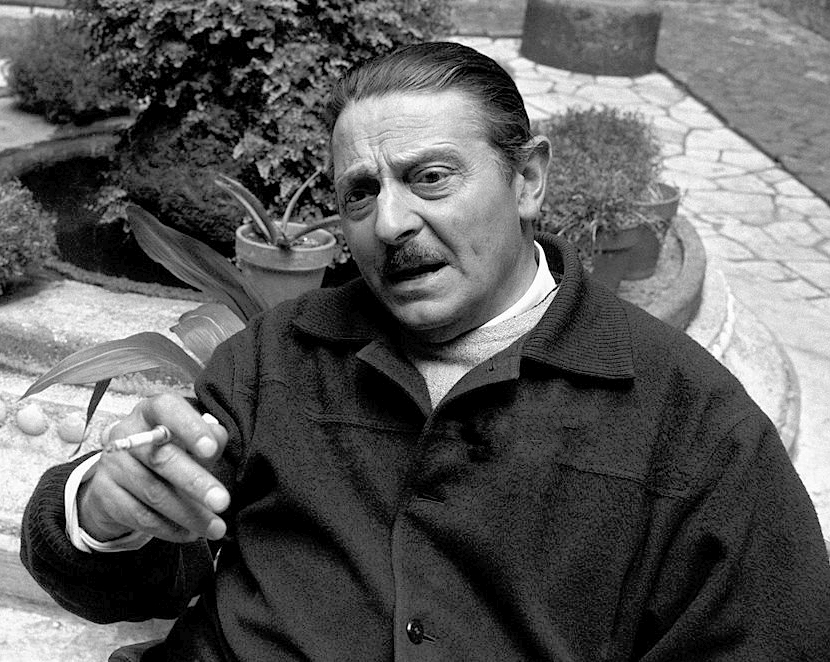
Blasetti in 1965

Blasetti was born in Rome, where he also died. After studying law at university, Blasetti chose to become a journalist and film critic. He worked for several film magazines and led a campaign for national film production, which had largely ceased by this point. In 1919 he made a brief foray into acting when he appeared as an extra in Mario Caserini's Tortured Soul.

== Director ==
In 1929 Blasetti made his directorial debut with Sun, a fictional story set against the ongoing draining of the Pontine Marshes. The film was well received at a time when there were few Italian films being made. Benito Mussolini described it as "the dawn of the Fascist film". Like many of his early productions, it had elements that were a precursor to neorealism.

The strong reception for Sun led to Blasetti receiving an offer from Stefano Pittaluga, the only significant commercial producer left working in Italy at the time. Pittaluga had recently converted his Rome studios for sound films. Blasetti directed what would have been the first Italian sound film Resurrection, but delays meant that it was released after Gennaro Righelli's The Song of Love.

In 1934 Blasetti directed the play 18 BL a "mass theatre" performed outdoors with 2,000 amateur actors.

Blasetti was a driving force in the revival of the Italian film industry in the 1930s, having lobbied for greater state funding and support. It also led to the construction of the large Cinecittà studios in Rome.

His approach to budget and use of regular people, non-professional actors, also set a precedent that followed in the form of Neo-Realism. In addition, his range of film genres was unique for its time in which set directors played to given and set styles, such as comedy and drama. Instead, his work involved from historic to comedy to drama to theatre content.

== Later life ==
He played himself in Luchino Visconti's film Bellissima starred by Anna Magnani, a Roman mother who desires to make her daughter a filmstar in Cinecittà where Blasetti makes the screen test for the child actors.

He was president of the jury at the 1967 Cannes Film Festival. His 1969 film Simón Bolívar was entered into the 6th Moscow International Film Festival.

== Selected filmography ==
- Sun (1929)
- Nerone (1930)
- Resurrectio (1931)
- Mother Earth (1931)
- The Table of the Poor (1932)
- Palio (1932)
- The Haller Case (1933)
- 1860 (1934)
- The Old Guard (1934)
- Aldebaran (1935)
- The Countess of Parma (1936)
- Ettore Fieramosca (1938)
- Backstage (1939)
- An Adventure of Salvator Rosa (1940)
- The Iron Crown (1941)
- The Jester's Supper (1942)
- Four Steps in the Clouds (1943)
- Men of the Mountain (1943)
- No Turning Back (1945)
- Un giorno nella vita (1946)
- Fabiola (1949)
- Father's Dilemma (1950)
- In Olden Days (1951)
- Too Bad She's Bad (1954)
- A Slice of Life (1954)
- Lucky to Be a Woman (1956)
- Love and Chatter (1957)
- Europa di notte (1959)
- I Love, You Love (1961)
- Three Fables of Love (1962)
- Liolà (1963)
- Me, Me, Me... and the Others (1966)
- Simón Bolívar (1969)

== Bibliography ==
- Moliterno, Gino (2008). Historical Dictionary of Italian Cinema. Lanham, Maryland: Scarecrow Press. ISBN 978-0810862548.
