= Napoli milionaria =

Napoli milionaria (Italian for 'Millionaire Naples') may refer to:

- The Millions of Naples, 1945 play by Eduardo De Filippo
- Side Street Story, 1950 Italian comedy film based on the play
- Napoli milionaria (opera), 1977 opera based on the play
