= Cesare Bettarini =

Italian actor (1901–1975)

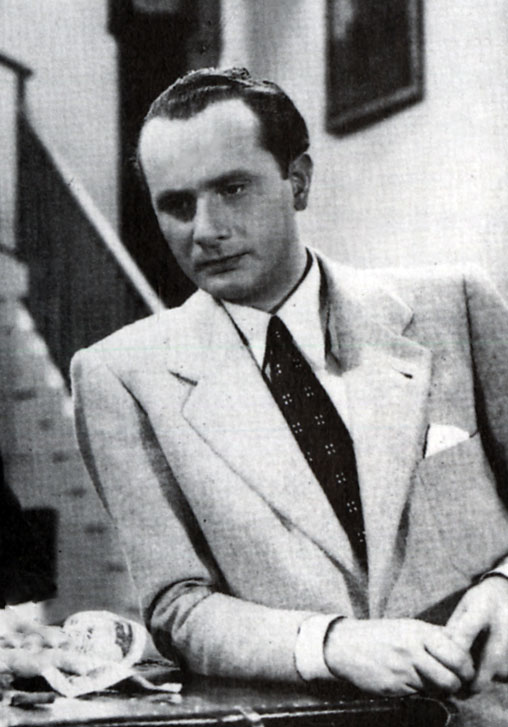
- Born: 17 October 1901; Florence, Tuscany; Italy
- Died: 19 October 1975 (aged 74); Florence, Tuscany; Italy
- Occupation: Actor
- Years active: 1935 - 1976 (film)

Cesare Bettarini (17 October 1901 – 19 October 1975) was an Italian film actor. He appeared in a number of productions during the Fascist era, including the 1935 drama Like the Leaves (1935).

== Filmography ==
Year	Title	Role	Notes
1935	Like the Leaves	Tommy	
1935	Casta Diva	Francesco Fiorino	
1935	La luce del mondo	Il figlio del nobile e della governante	
1936	The Wedding March	Claudio Morillot	
1936	Pierpin	Il suo fidanzato	
1936	La Damigella di Bard	Franco Toscani	
1938	Destiny		
1939	Naples Will Never Die	Pietro	
1939	Fascino	Paolo	
1942	The Adventures of Fra Diavolo	Carlo Consiglio	
1942	Colpi di timone	Il commendator Felice Precordi	
1950	That Ghost of My Husband		
1952	Five Paupers in an Automobile	Il medico	
1952	Milady and the Musketeers		
1952	Son of the Hunchback		
1952	We Two Alone	The Angry Lodger	
1952	Non è vero... ma ci credo	Doctor Pinelli	
1953	Sins of Rome		Uncredited
1953	Nero and the Burning of Rome		
1953	Easy Years		
1953	Martin Toccaferro		
1953	Via Padova 46	The Police Commissioner at the Airport	Uncredited
1953	I Always Loved You	Don Antonio	
1954	A Day in Court	Avv. Tonnara	
1958	Move and I'll Shoot		

== Bibliography ==
- Caldiron, Orio. Isa Miranda. Gremese Editore, 1978.
