= 1949 in Italian television =

This is a list of Italian television related events from 1949.

== Events ==
- 11 September: after a ten-year hiatus due to the war, experimental television broadcasts resume in Italy for the first international television congress in Milan. The programming consists mostly of music and dance shows., classical and light; it includes also variety numbers with Wanda Osiris, Ugo Tognazzi and Tino Scotti and an interview with Fausto Coppi. In the first Italian TV report, the delegates to the congress see themselves on the little screen as they are visiting the RAI center in Turin. However, this new start causes quarrels about the seat of the new service (Milan or Turin) and about the broadcasting standard (the American one, at 625 lines, or the French one, at 813). In Turin, two stations are active, one built by General Electric, (625 lines), and one with material provided by French TV (819 lines).
- 16 September: the first opera is aired on Italian television; RAI broadcasts Giovanni Battista Pergolesi's La serva padrona, with Sesto Bruscantini, from the Corso Sempione studio in Milan.
- 8-23 October: for the Turin Mechanical Exhibition, RAI carries out new television experiments, for four hours a day (five on Sundays). In addition to the special stand of the exhibition, the shows are visible on two televisions installed in the showcases of the journals La Stampa and La Gazzetta del popolo..
- 6 November: Italian president Luigi Einaudi, during a visit to the RAI seat in Turin, attends experiments in television broadcasting.
- 24 December: first post-war TV chronicle in Rome; the Holy Seat broadcasts live the opening of the Holy Door for the 1950 Jubilee, with technical means provided by French television. During the Holy Year, the Vatican TV station broadcasts the main ceremonies taking place in St. Peter's Basilica.
