= Zingari (film) =

1920 film

- Directed by: Mario Almirante
- Starring: Italia Almirante-Manzini
- Cinematography: Ubaldo Arata
- Production company: Fert Film
- Distributed by: Societa Anonima Stefano Pittaluga
- Release date: 27 December 1920
- Country: Italy
- Languages: Silent; Italian intertitles

Zingari (English: Gypsies) is a 1920 Italian silent film directed by Mario Almirante and starring Italia Almirante-Manzini.

== Cast ==
- Italia Almirante-Manzini as Vielka
- Joaquín Carrasco as Il curato
- Alfonso Cassini as Jammadar
- Amleto Novelli as Sindel
- Franz Sala as Gudlo
- Rosetta Solari as Radscia
- Arturo Stinga as Leandro Klotz

== Bibliography ==
- Moliterno, Gino. The A to Z of Italian Cinema. Scarecrow Press, 2009.
