= Toto vs. the Four =

- Directed by: Steno
- Written by: Bruno Corbucci; Giovanni Grimaldi; Stefano Vanzina
- Starring: Totò; Peppino De Filippo; Aldo Fabrizi; Nino Taranto; Erminio Macario
- Cinematography: Clemente Santoni
- Edited by: Giuliana Attenni
- Music by: Gianni Ferrio
- Distributed by: Titanus
- Release date: 1963
- Running time: 94 min
- Country: Italy
- Language: Italian

Totò contro i quattro, internationally released as Toto vs. the Four, is a 1963 Italian comedy film directed by Steno. Despite its title, it was not a true fusion between Totò and the four, but the film consists in interwoven episodes in which Totò makes pair from time to time with one of them. It was defined as a "winningly funny police farce".

== Plot ==
At the Commissioner Antonio is stolen the car during a night. He needs to find her first address four cases of thievery in the city of Rome. The defendants are Peppino De Filippo, Aldo Fabrizi, Nino Taranto and Erminio Macario. Thanks to the stories these four funny characters at the end Antonio, moreover, by disguising woman, manages to capture the thieves in an area of Villa Borghese.

== Cast ==
- Totò: Police Commissioner Antonio Saracino
- Peppino De Filippo: Cav. Alfredo Fiore
- Aldo Fabrizi: Don Amilcare
- Nino Taranto: Giuseppe Mastrillo
- Erminio Macario: Colonel La Matta
- Ugo d'Alessio: Di Sabato
- Carlo delle Piane: Pecorino
- Mario Castellani: Comm. Filippo Lancetti
- Pietro Carloni : brother in law of Lancetti
- Rossella Como: Wife of Lancetti
- Dany París: Jacqueline
- Ivy Holzer: Miss Durant
- Moira Orfei: Miss Fiore
- Nino Terzo: Agent Pappalardo
- Gregorio Wu Pak Chiu : domestic Chinese
- Mariano Laurenti : car driver of Fiat 600
