= Ragazze da marito =

- Directed by: Eduardo De Filippo
- Written by: Eduardo De Filippo; Age & Scarpelli
- Cinematography: Leonida Barboni
- Music by: Nino Rota
- Distributed by: Titanus
- Release date: 1952
- Running time: 92 minute
- Country: Italy
- Language: Italian

Ragazze da marito is a 1952 Italian comedy film.

== Cast ==
- Eduardo De Filippo as Oreste Mazzillo
- Peppino De Filippo as Giacomo Scognamiglio
- Titina De Filippo as Agnese Mazzillo
- Lianella Carell as Gina Mazzillo
- Anna Maria Ferrero as Anna Maria Mazzillo
- Delia Scala as Gabriella Mazzillo
- Carlo Campanini as Cipriano
- Carlo Croccolo as the hawker
- Rosario Borelli as Carlo
- Laura Gore as Rosa
- Monica Clay as Kiki
- Franco Fabrizi as Claudio Fortis
- Pamela Matthews as Mirca
- Lyla Rocco as Doris
- Olinto Cristina as Commendator Spadoni
- Ivo Garrani as Tommaso Spadoni
