= Siamo tutti inquilini =

1953 film

- Film poster
- Directed by: Mario Mattoli
- Written by: Vittorio Calvino; Ruggero Maccari
- Starring: Aldo Fabrizi
- Cinematography: Marco Scarpelli
- Edited by: Giuliana Attenni
- Music by: Pippo Barzizza
- Release date: 1953
- Running time: 98 minutes
- Country: Italy
- Language: Italian

Siamo tutti inquilini (literally: We are all tenants) is a 1953 Italian comedy film directed by Mario Mattoli and starring Aldo Fabrizi.

== Production ==
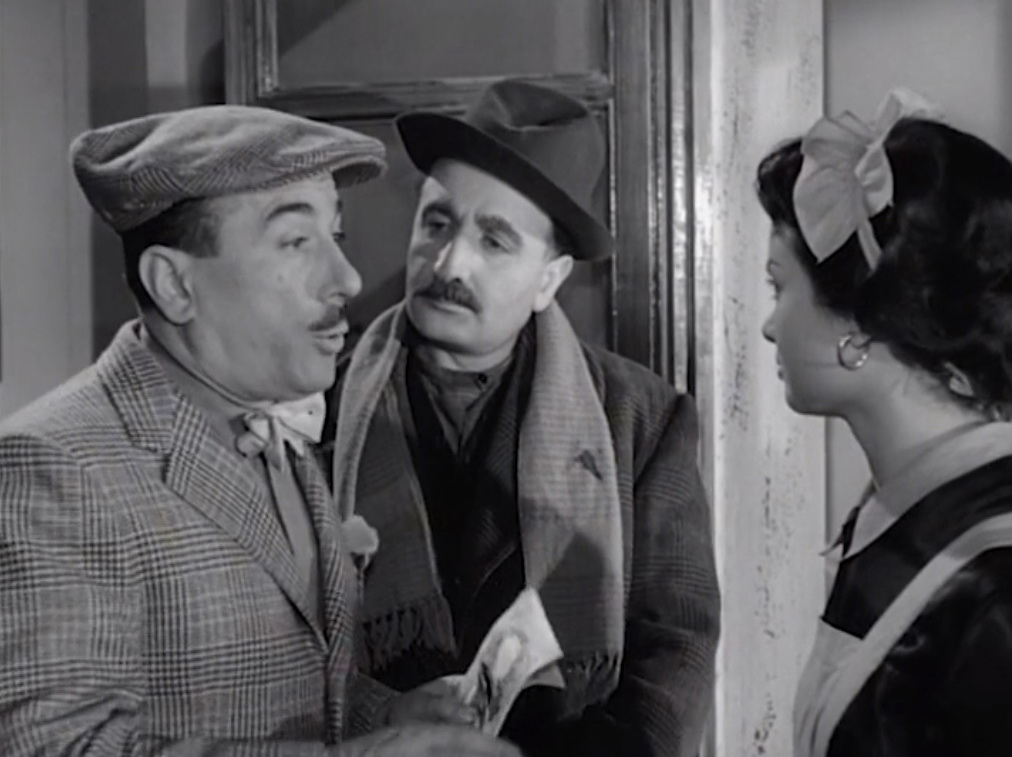
Still from the film

The film is a 98 minute black and white that was produced for Documento.

== Plot ==
Anna has been since childhood the housemaid of an old lady, and has inherited from her a beautiful condo. She now works in a café, but struggles to keep up with the expenses of the luxurious housing complex. She is alone in the world and apart from her loving fiance Carlo, only the wise caretaker of the building Augusto shows her some fatherly affection.

The greedy and tyrannical administrator of the building, the dentist Talloni, would like to exploit the financial difficulties of Anna to buy her out, offering through a figurehead to acquire the condo much below its real value. Augusto and the lawyer Sassi figure out the scheme and decide to defend Anna's interests. First, they manage to delay the official decision to force repayment of her debts for few days while they try to secure her a loan through the bank or through the richer acquaintance of a well-off neighbor. They also come up with the idea for Anna to rent out the apartment to an older couple while remaining staying on as housemaid and caretaker of the property.

None of this presents a complete solution for the young girl's problems, and everybody must simultaneously manage other complications: Sassi worries about his jealous wife's reaction to his excessive involvement; and Augusto must protect his job from both Talloni's intention to fire him because of his attempts to help Anna and from a poorer friend who wants his job. The building's other tenants seem generally well-disposed but they are also very self-absorbed. However, Augusto's selfless efforts, including mild trickery, gather all neighbors to a crucial meeting where the course of action for Anna's debt should be decided. Talloni's corrupt plans are eventually exposed and a compromise arrangement is reached.

== Cast ==
- Aldo Fabrizi as Augusto, the caretaker
- Anna Maria Ferrero as Anna Perrini, heiress of a luxurious apartment where she had been serving as housemaid
- Enrico Viarisio as the lawyer Sassi
- Tania Weber as Lulù
- Nino Pavese as the denstist Talloni, administrator of the housing complex
- Maria Pia Casilio as Una cameriera
- Alberto Talegalli as Il venditore di uova
- Giuseppe Porelli
- Bice Valori as Una cameriera
- Maurizio Arena as Carlo, boyfriend of Anna
- Gemma Bolognesi
- Turi Pandolfini
- Peppino De Filippo as Antonio Scognamiglio, idler friend of Augusto who would like to take his place as caretaker
