= Sergio Tofano =

Italian actor, theatre director and playwright

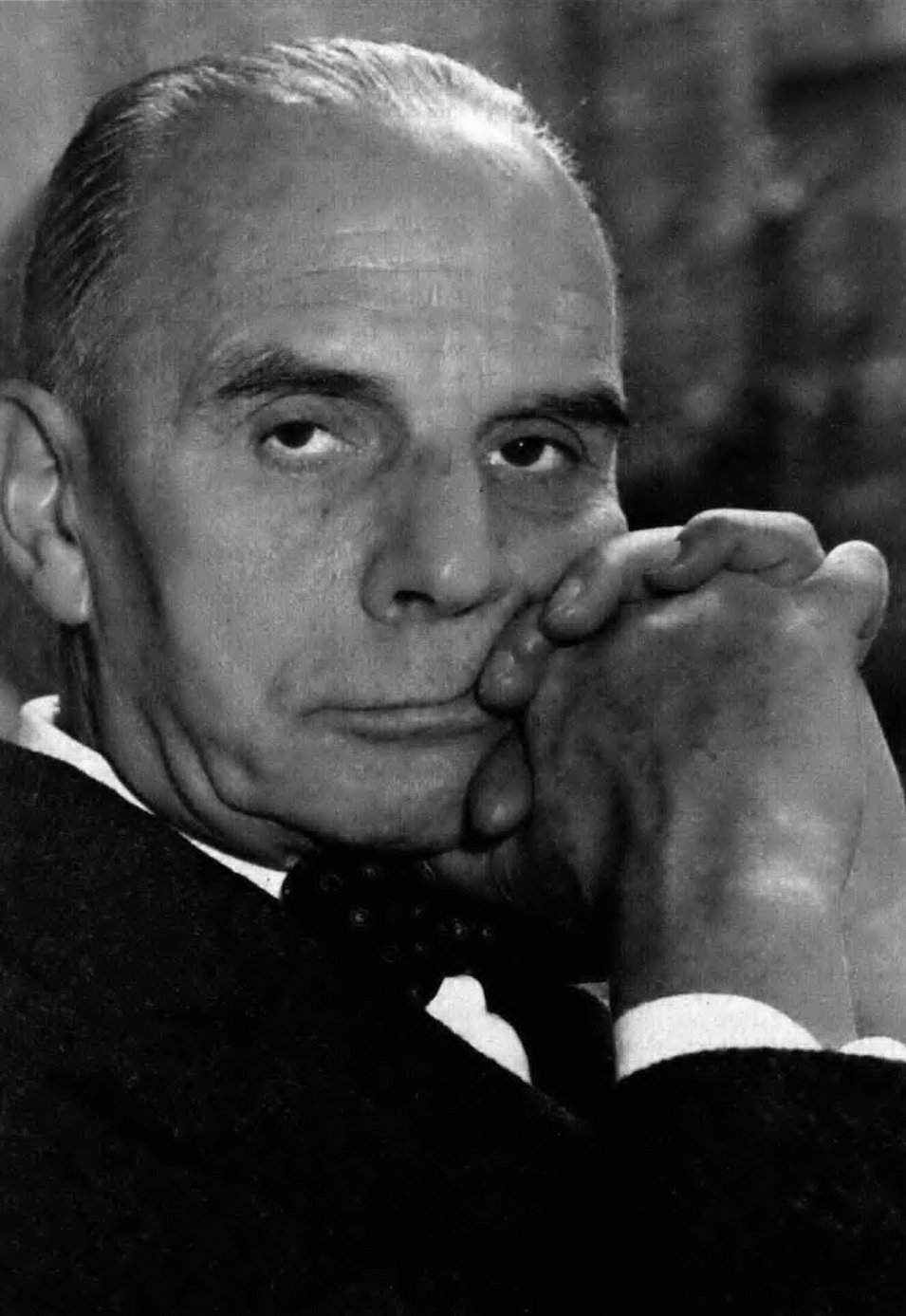
- Tofano in Radiocorriere TV magazine, 1969
- Born: 20 August 1886; Rome, Kingdom of Italy
- Died: 28 October 1973 (aged 87); Rome, Italy
- Occupations: Actor; theatre director; playwright; scene designer; illustrator
- Years active: 1909–1973
- Spouse: Rosetta Tofano (m. 1923; died 1960)
- Children: 1

Sergio Tòfano (20 August 1886 – 28 October 1973) was an Italian actor, theatre director, playwright, scene designer and illustrator. As a comics artist, he is best-known for creating Signor Bonaventura.

== Biography ==
Tofano was born in Rome. In 1909, he made his first appearance on stage with Ermete Novelli, then joined Virgilio Talli's company (1913–23). He soon specialized as a comic actor, giving his role a new elegance and complexity. He worked with other famous actors and directors: Dario Niccodemi (1924–27); Luigi Almirante and Giuditta Rissone (1927–30), Elsa Merlini, Vittorio De Sica, Evi Maltagliati, Gino Cervi etc. During those years, he made his famous performances as Doctor Knock in Jules Romains' play, and as Professor Toti in Luigi Pirandello's Pensaci, Giacomino!. He also led important theatrical firms.

After the Second World War, he worked with the most important directors, like Luchino Visconti and Giorgio Strehler.

In 1917 Tofano invented, for a children's magazine, Il Corriere dei Piccoli, a famous character, Signor Bonaventura, whose adventures lasted for more than forty years. He used to sign as Sto. He wrote and illustrated several children's books and illustrated The Chess Set in the Mirror by Massimo Bontempelli.

== Partial filmography ==
- Tigrana (1916, dir. by Edouard Micheroux de Dillon)
- The Private Secretary (1931, dir. by Goffredo Alessandrini) - Otello, l'usciere
- Your Money or Your Life (1932, dir. by Carlo Ludovico Bragaglia) - Daniele
- The Telephone Operator (1932, dir. by Nunzio Malasomma) - Bàttigo - the tenor
- Paprika (1933, dir. by Carl Boese) - Checco
- The Girl with the Bruise (1933, dir. by E. W. Emo)
- Seconda B (1934, dir. by Goffredo Alessandrini) - Professore Monti
- Lohengrin (1936, dir. by Nunzio Malasomma) - Giulio
- The Two Misanthropists (1937, dir. by Amleto Palermi) - Cosimo Bertelet
- Tonight at Eleven (1938, dir. by Oreste Biancoli) - Il colonnello Muffon
- Jeanne Doré (1938, dir. by Mario Bonnard) - Fanard
- Inventiamo l'amore (1938, dir. by Camillo Mastrocinque) - Borghetti
- The Sons of the Marquis Lucera (1939, dir. by Amleto Palermi) - Vigna
- Eravamo sette sorelle (1939, dir. by Mario Mattoli) - Antonio, il maggiordomo
- Le sorprese del divorzio (1939, dir. by Guido Brignone) - Fernand Corbulon
- Father For a Night (1939, dir. by Mario Bonnard) - Edmondo Fontages
- Follie del secolo (1939, dir. by Amleto Palermi) - Il barone Giorgio
- The Silent Partner (1939) - L'affaristo in borsa
- Validità giorni dieci (1940, dir. by Camillo Mastrocinque) - Maurizio
- Giù il sipario (1940, dir. by Raffaello Matarazzo) - Il capocomico
- La granduchessa si diverte (1940, dir. by Giacomo Gentilomo) - Il principe
- Una famiglia impossibile (1940, dir. by Carlo Ludovico Bragaglia) - Il maggiordomo
- Idyll in Budapest (1941, dir. by Giorgio Ansoldi) - Altezza
- Il signore a doppio petto (1941, dir. by Flavio Calzavara) - Il signore Bisaccia
- Cenerentola e il signor Bonaventura (1941, anche soggetto e regia) - Il dottore (uncredited)
- Se io fossi onesto (1942, dir. by Carlo Ludovico Bragaglia) - Vittorio, il maggiordomo
- Disturbance (1942, dir. by Guido Brignone) - Antonio, padre di Silvia
- Souls in Turmoil (1942, dir. by Giulio Del Torre) - Perego
- La guardia del corpo (1942, dir. by Carlo Ludovico Bragaglia) - L'avvocato Paolo, suo marito
- Fourth Page (1943, dir. by Nicola Manzari) - Il professore naturalista
- Gian Burrasca (1943, anche regia) - Il maestro di pianoforte
- Il fidanzato di mia moglie (1943, dir. by Carlo Ludovico Bragaglia) - Il giudice Ernesto Torriani
- La maschera e il volto (1943, dir. by Camillo Mastrocinque) - Cirillo
- Il cavaliere del sogno (1947, dir. by Camillo Mmastrocinque) - Il maestro Zingarelli
- Fabiola (1949, dir. by Alessandro Blasetti) - Luciano
- Abbiamo vinto! (1951, dir. by Robert A. Stemmle) - Temistocle Leoni
- Napoleon (1951, dir. by Carlo Borghesio) - Vignon
- Altri tempi (1952, dir. by Alessandro Blasetti) - Nonno di Guido (segment "L'idillio")
- La Fiammata (1952, dir. by Alessandro Blasetti) - Belmont
- Guilt Is Not Mine (1952, dir. by Giuseppe Masini) - Prof. Valli
- Puccini (1953, dir. by Carmine Gallone) - Giulio Ricordi
- The Country of the Campanelli (1954, dir. by Jean Boyer) - Dott. Pott
- House of Ricordi (1954, dir. by Carmine Gallone) - Cesarini Sforza
- Cardinal Lambertini (1954, dir. by Giorgio Pastina) - Canonico Peggi
- La bella di Roma (1955, dir. by Luigi Comencini) - Agostino
- Andrea Chenier (1955, dir. by Clemente Fracassi) - Luigi Chénier
- Porta un bacione a Firenze (1956, dir. by Camillo Mastrocinque) - Giovanni
- Io, Caterina (1957)
- La vita degli altri (1957) - Linari
- Dreams in a Drawer (1957, dir. by Renato Castellani) - Lucia's Father
- Il bacio del sole (Don Vesuvio) (1958)
- Il re di Poggioreale (1961, dir. by Duilio Coletti) - Il contente Pignatelli
- La costanza della ragione (1964, dir. by Pasquale Festa Campanile) - Don Bonifazi
- Napoleone a Firenze (1964)
- Il padre di famiglia (1967, dir. by Nanni Loy) - General
- Partner (1968, dir. by Bernardo Bertolucci) - Professor Petrushka
- Toh, è morta la nonna! (1969, dir. by Mario Monicelli) - The Grandfather
- Contestazone generale (1970, dir. by Luigi Zampa) - Bishop
- La colonna infame (1973, dir. by Nelo Risi) - Il presidente del senato
- Rugantino (1973, dir. by Pasquale Festa Campanile) - Marchese Michele Sacconi
