= I Live as I Please =

1942 film

- Directed by: Mario Mattoli
- Written by: Leo Cattozzo; Mario Mattoli
- Produced by: Carlo Bugiani; Lorenzo Pegoraro
- Starring: Ferruccio Tagliavini; Silvana Jachino; Luigi Almirante
- Cinematography: Aldo Tonti
- Edited by: Fernando Tropea
- Music by: Salvatore Allegra
- Production companies: Grandi Film; Pegoraro Film
- Distributed by: Grandi Film
- Release date: 26 January 1942
- Running time: 83 minutes
- Country: Italy
- Language: Italian

I Live as I Please (Italian: Voglio vivere così) is a 1942 Italian "white-telephones" comedy film directed by Mario Mattoli and starring Ferruccio Tagliavini, Silvana Jachino and Luigi Almirante. It was shot at the Titanus Studios in Rome. The film's sets were designed by the art directors Piero Filippone and Mario Rappini.

== Cast ==
- Ferruccio Tagliavini as Stefano
- Silvana Jachino as Maria
- Luigi Almirante as L'impresario
- Carlo Campanini as Oreste
- Nino Crisman as Leone
- Carlo Micheluzzi as Il commesso viaggiatore
- Giovanni Grasso as Il dottore
- Armando Migliari as Il padre di Stefano
- Dora Bini as Claretta
- Loris Gizzi as Il tenore
- Piero Carnabuci as Il direttore d'orchestra

== Bibliography ==
- Roberto Chiti & Roberto Poppi. I film: Tutti i film italiani dal 1930 al 1944. Gremese Editore, 2005.
