= Peppino De Filippo =

Italian actor (1903–1980)

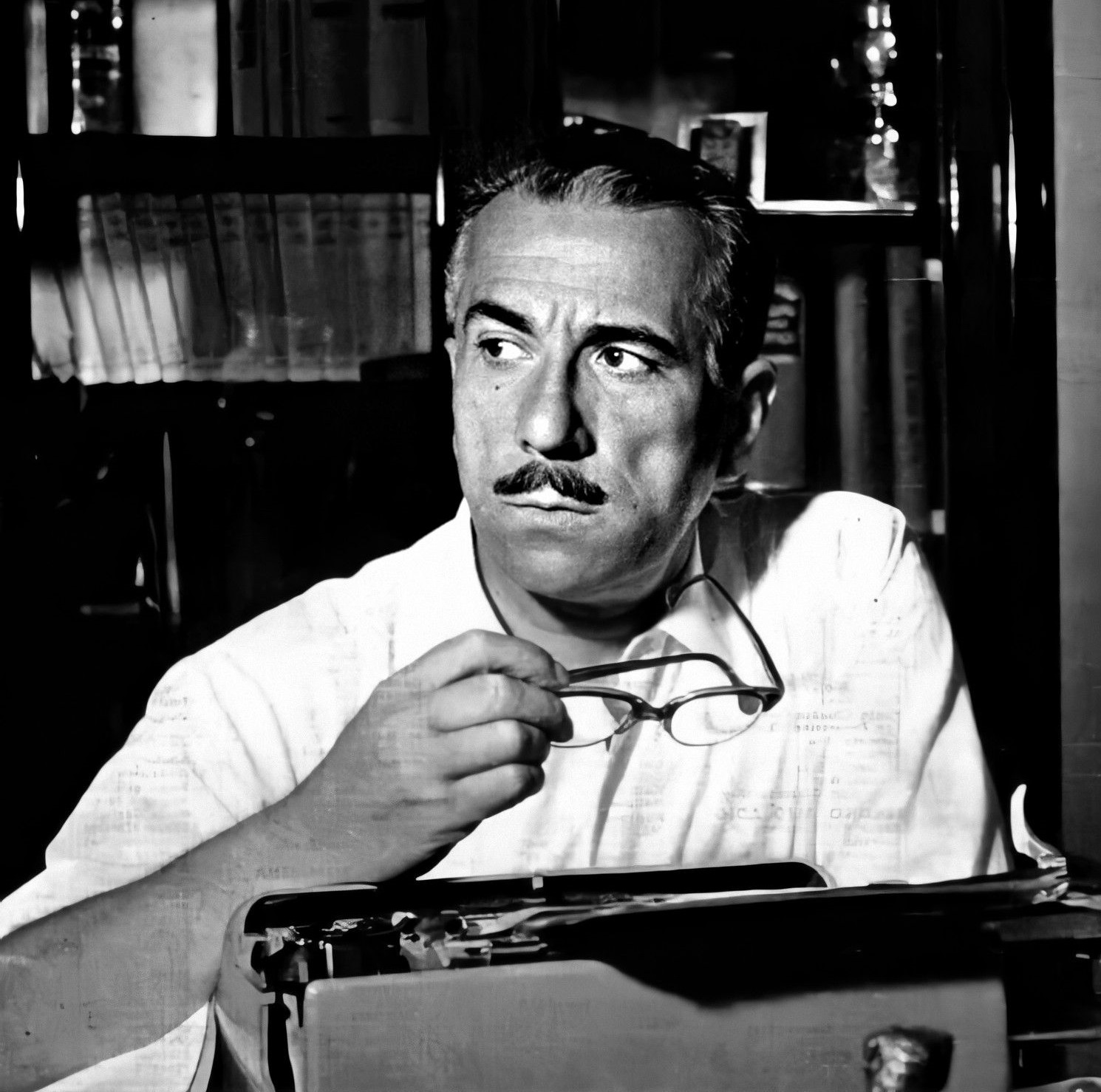
- Peppino De Filippo in 1959
- Born: Giuseppe De Filippo; 24 August 1903; Naples, Kingdom of Italy
- Died: 27 January 1980 (aged 76); Rome, Italy
- Occupation: Actor
- Height: 1.69 m (5 ft 7 in)
- Spouses: Adele Carloni; Lidia Martora; Lelia Mangano
- Children: Luigi De Filippo
- Parents: Eduardo Scarpetta (father); Luisa De Filippo (mother)
- Relatives: Eduardo De Filippo (brother); Titina De Filippo (sister); Eduardo Passarelli (half-brother); Pietro Carloni (brother-in-law); Ester Carloni (sister-in-law); Luca De Filippo (nephew)

Giuseppe "Peppino" De Filippo (24 August 1903 – 27 January 1980) was an Italian actor.

De Filippo was born in Naples, the brother of actors and dramatists Eduardo and Titina De Filippo. He made his stage debut at the age of six. He played in several movies such as Rome-Paris-Rome, Variety Lights, A Day in Court, Ferdinand I, King of Naples and Boccaccio '70. He is however, most remembered for his several artistic partnerships with Totò, on movies such as Toto, Peppino, and the Hussy and The Band of Honest Men. He died in Rome at age 76.

== Biography ==
He was born from the affair between playwright and actor Eduardo Scarpetta and theatre seamstress and costumier Luisa De Filippo. He was the third of three children born from the couple, the other two being Annunziata "Titina" and Eduardo. His father was actually married since 1876 to Rosa De Filippo, Luisa's paternal aunt. His father Eduardo, had several other illegitimate children from various affairs (including actors Ernesto Murolo, Eduardo Passarelli and Pasquale De Filippo).

After several attempts with different acting companies, as a utility player, in 1931 he and his siblings founded the Compagnia Teatro Umoristico: i De Filippo. It was a very successful experience, featuring tours all over Italy, new comedies, enthusiastic ratings by critics, and sold out in theaters.

However, in 1944, due to a controversy with his brother, Peppino abandoned the company. The separation would allow him to find his own stylistic footprint as an author, being easily distinguishable from Eduardo's: Peppino's comedies are usually easier and more brilliant.

Peppino repeatedly showed his extraordinary versatility; particularly noteworthy are his performance in The Caretaker by Harold Pinter and in The Miser by Molière (as Harpagon), where he proved to be a skillful actor whose ability had grown beyond brilliant and dialect plays.

Peppino should be defined an actor as well as a popular TV and cinema star. His partnership with Totò in many films has been one among the most interesting collaborations in the Italian comical cinema genre. Their movies obtained an outstanding success, despite being snubbed by critics. Worth a mention are Toto, Peppino, and the Hussy, Toto, Peppino and the Outlaws, and The Band of Honest Men. He worked with Federico Fellini as well, for instance in Boccaccio '70, and with Alberto Lattuada.

He also invented Pappagone, a character for a TV show. He represented a humble servant of Cummendatore Peppino De Filippo (the title of Commendatore is a public honour of the Italian Republic). He performed as a sort of usher, a typical character of the Neapolitan theatre, and coined many funny phrases and an own jargon, that would transform into popular sayings. He married three times, and his first wife Adele Carloni gave him Luigi, who successfully carried on his father's work.

He was married three times. From his first wife Adele (or Adelina) Carloni he had his only child, Luigi De Filippo. His second wife was actress Lidia Martora (pseudonym of Lidia Maresca) and was the sister of dancer Marisa Maresca. He married for the third time to Lelia Mangano. The actor Pietro Carloni (his first wife Adele's brother) was married to his sister Titina. The actress Ester Carloni was another sibling of his wife Adele.

== Filmography ==
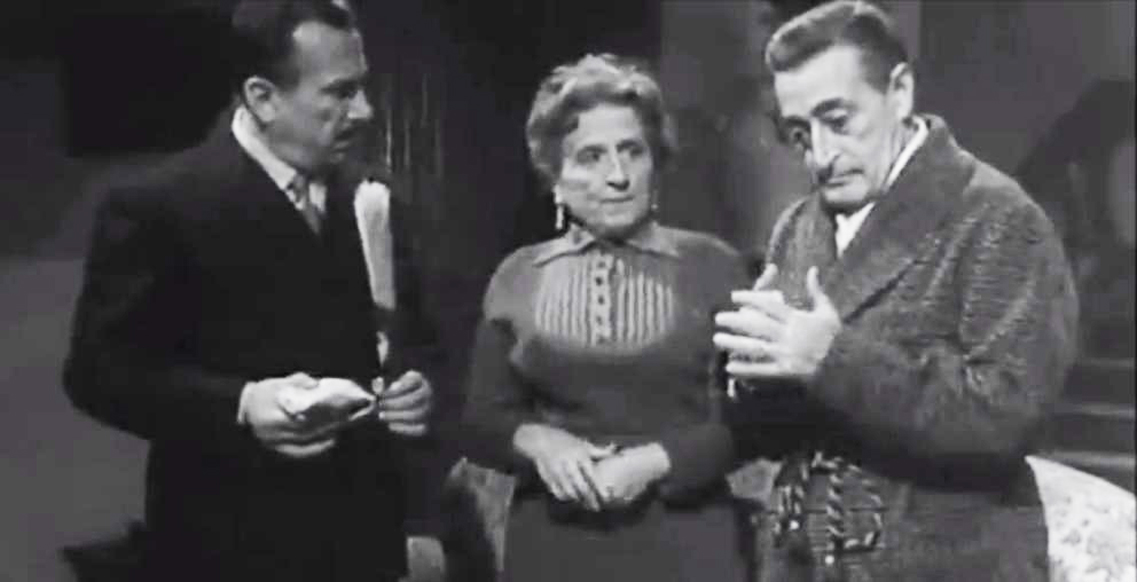
Peppino De Filippo with Totò and Titina De Filippo in Toto, Peppino and the Outlaws (1956)

- Three Lucky Fools (1933) – Andrea
- The Three-Cornered Hat (1933) – Luca, il mugnaio
- Those Two (1935) – Giacomino
- It Was I! (1937) – Carlino
- L'amor mio non muore... (1938) – Luigino Spanato, il detective
- The Marquis of Ruvolito (1939) – Il marchese Erasmo di Mezzomondello
- In the Country Fell a Star (1939) – Luigino Montuori
- Il sogno di tutti (1940) – L'avvocate fanfarone
- Lucky Night (1941) – Biagio Natalini
- L'ultimo combattimento (1941) – Alberto
- A che servono questi quattrini? (1942) – Vincenzino Esposito
- Le signorine della villa accanto (1942) – L'autista
- Non ti pago! (1942) – Procopio Bertolini
- After Casanova's Fashion (1942) – Don Agostino
- The Peddler and the Lady (1943) – Aurelio
- Non mi muovo! (1943) – Pasqualino Squeglia
- Ti conosco, mascherina! (1943) – Celestino De Rosa
- I Met You in Naples (1946)
- Natale al campo 119 (1947) – Gennarino Capece, il napoletano
- Vivere a sbafo (1949)
- Snow White and the Seven Thieves (1949) – Rag. Peppino Biancaneve
- The Transporter (1950) – Tony La Motta
- Variety Lights (1951) – Checco Dal Monte
- Beauties on Bicycles (1951) – Il ladro
- Rome-Paris-Rome (1951) – Gennaro
- Cameriera bella presenza offresi... (1951) – L'avvocato
- The Passaguai Family (1951) – Cavalier Massa
- Ragazze da marito (1952) – Giacomino Scognamiglio
- Toto and the Women (1952) – Il dottor Desideri
- Non è vero... ma ci credo (1952) – Gervasio Savastano
- Siamo tutti inquilini (1953) – Antonio Scognamiglio
- Martin Toccaferro (1953) – Martino Lazzari
- One of Those (1953) – Martino
- Funniest Show on Earth (1953) – Uno spettatore
- A Day in Court (1954) – Judge Salomone Lorusso
- Via Padova 46 (1954) – Arduino Buongiorno
- Peppino e la vecchia signora (1954) – Zaganella
- Le signorine dello 04 (1955) – Revisore Delli Santi, il vedovo
- The Sign of Venus (1955) – Mario
- The Last Five Minutes (1955) – Filippo Roberti
- The Two Friends (1955) – Ciccillo
- Accadde al penitenziario (1955) – Peppino
- Io piaccio (1955) – Nicolino
- Cortile (1955) – Ragionier Gargiulo
- I pappagalli (1955) – Beppi
- Un po' di cielo (1955)
- The Letters Page (1955) – Pipinuccio Gigliozzi
- Motivo in maschera (1955) – signor Cuciniello
- The Band of Honest Men (1956) – Giuseppe Lo Turco
- Guardia, guardia scelta, brigadiere e maresciallo (1956) – Guardia Scelta Giuseppe Manganiello
- Toto, Peppino, and the Hussy (1956) – Peppino Caponi
- Toto, Peppino and the Outlaws (1956) – Peppino
- Oh! Sabella (1957) – Emilio
- Vacanze a Ischia (1957) – Battistella
- Peppino, le modelle e chella là (1957) – Peppino
- Anna of Brooklyn (1958) – Peppino
- Toto, Peppino and the Fanatics (1958) – Cavalier Peppino Caprioli
- Bread, Love and Andalusia (1958) – Peppino
- Tuppe tuppe, Marescià! (1958) – Don Percuoco
- Policarpo (1959) – Cavalier Cesare Pancarano di Rondò
- You're on Your Own (1959) – Giuseppe 'Peppino' Armentano
- La nipote Sabella (1959) – Emilio
- La cambiale (1959) – Peppino Posalaquaglia
- Ferdinando I, re di Napoli (1959) – Ferdinand I.
- I genitori in Blue-Jeans (1960) – Giuseppe 'Peppino' Grimaldi
- Love and Larceny (1960) – Chinotto
- Gentlemen Are Born (1960) – Pio Degli Ulivi
- Letto a tre piazze (1960) – Prof. Peppino Castagnano
- Who Hesitates is Lost (1960) – Giuseppe Colabona
- Some Like It Cold (1960) – Titozzi
- Gli incensurati (1961) – Giuseppe Corona
- Totò, Peppino e la dolce vita (1961) – Peppino
- Il carabiniere a cavallo (1961) – Il brigadiere Tarquinio
- Il mio amico Benito (1962) – Giuseppe Di Gennaro
- Toto and Peppino Divided in Berlin (1962) – Giuseppe 'Peppino' Pagliuca
- Boccaccio '70 (1962) – Dr. Antonio Mazzuolo (segment "Le tentazioni del dottor Antonio")
- The Four Monks (1962) – Fra' Crispino
- The Four Musketeers (1963) – Cardinal Richelieu
- The Shortest Day (1963) – Zio Peppino
- Toto vs. the Four (1963) – Alfredo Fiori
- Adultero lui, adultera lei (1963) – Il pubblico ministero
- Gli onorevoli (1963) – Giuseppe Mollica
- I 4 tassisti (1963) – Pasquale Scognamiglio (segment "Opera buona, Un'")
- La vedovella (1965) – Don Pietro, il sindaco
- Made in Italy (1965) – Mimi (segment "5 'La Famiglia', episode 1")
- Ischia operazione amore (1966) – Gennaro Capatosta
- La fabbrica dei soldi (1966) – Carmelo Pappagone
- Rita the Mosquito (1966) – Carmelo
- Don't Sting the Mosquito (1967) – Carmelo
- Soldati e capelloni (1967) – Peppino Pica
- Totò story (1968) – Peppino
- Zum zum zum (1969) – Peppino Bertozzini
- Zum, zum, zum n° 2 (1969) – Peppino Bertozzini
- Lisa dagli occhi blu (1969) – Peppino / Amleto
- Gli infermieri della mutua (1969) – Gennarino Esposito
- Ninì Tirabusciò: la donna che inventò la mossa (1970) – Magistrate
- Neapolitan Mystery (1979) – Raffaele's Father (final film role)

== Theater works ==
- Trampoli e cilindri (un atto in dialetto napoletano) (1927)
- Un ragazzo di campagna (farsa in due parti) (1931)
- Don Raffaele il trombone (commedia in un atto) (1931)
- Spacca il centesimo (commedia in un atto) (1931)
- Miseria bella (farsa in un atto) (1931)
- Cupido scherza...e spazza (farsa in un atto in dialetto napoletano) (1931)
- Una persona fidata (farsa in un atto) (1931)
- Aria paesana (storia vecchia uguale per tutti in un atto) (1931)
- Quale onore! (farsa in un atto) (1931)
- Amori...e balestre! (farsa in un atto in dialetto napoletano) (1931)
- Caccia grossa! (un atto ironico romantico) (1932)
- A Coperchia è caduta una stella (farsa campestre in due parti) (1933)
- La lettera di mammà (farsa in due parti) (1933)
- Quaranta...ma non li dimostra (commedia in due parti in collaborazione con Titina De Filippo) (1933)
- Il ramoscello d'olivo (farsa in un atto) (1933)
- I brutti amano di più (commedia romantica in tre parti) (1933)
- Un povero ragazzo! (commedia in tre atti e quattro quadri) (1936)
- Il compagno di lavoro! (un atto in dialetto napoletano) (1936)
- Bragalà paga per tutti! (un atto in dialetto napoletano) (1939)
- Il grande attore! (commedia in un atto) (1940)
- Una donna romantica e un medico omeopatico (da una commedia-parodia in cinque atti di Riccardo di Castelvecchio. Riduzione in tre atti in dialetto napoletano) (1940)
- Non è vero... ma ci credo! (commedia in tre atti) (1942)
- Quel bandito sono io! (farsa in tre atti e quattro quadri) (1947)
- L'ospite gradito! (tre atti comici) (1948)
- Quel piccolo campo... (commedia in tre atti) (1948)
- Per me come se fosse! (commedia in due parti e quattro quadri) (1949)
- Carnevalata (un atto) (1950)
- Gennarino ha fatto il voto (farsa in tre atti) (1950)
- I migliori sono così (farsa in due parti e otto quadri) (1950)
- Pronti? Si gira! (satira buffa in un atto) (1952)
- Pranziamo insieme! (farsa in un atto) (1952)
- Io sono suo padre! (commedia in due parti e quattro quadri) (1952)
- Pater familias (commedia in un atto) (1955)
- Noi due! (commedia in un atto) (1955)
- Un pomeriggio intellettuale (commedia in un atto) (1955)
- Dietro la facciata (commedia in un atto) (1956)
- Le metamorfosi di un suonatore ambulante (farsa all'antica in un prologo, due parti e cinque quadri. Con appendice e musiche di Peppino De Filippo) (1956)
- Il talismano della felicità (farsa in un atto) (1956)
- La collana di cento noccioline (commedia in un atto) (1957)
- Omaggio a Plauto (un atto) (1963)
- Tutti i diavoli in corpo (un atto) (1965)
- L'amico del diavolo (commedia in tre atti) (1965)

== Bibliography ==
- Giulia Lunetta Savino (introduction by Massimo Troisi). Il buffone e il poveruomo, Dedalo, 1990.
- Enrico Giacovelli, Enrico Lancia. Peppino De Filippo, Gremese, 1992.
- Rodolfo Di Gianmarco, Leila Mangano. TuttoPeppino, Gremese, 1992.
- Alberto Anile. Totò e Peppino, fratelli d'Italia, Einaudi, 2001.
- Marco Giusti. Pappagone e non solo. Mondadori, 2003.
- Antonella Ottai. Vita è arte: Peppino De Filippo. Rai Eri, 2003.
- Pasquale Sabbatino, Giuseppina Scognamiglio. Peppino De Filippo e la comicità nel Novecento. Edizioni scientifiche italiane, 2005.
