= Ulysses (1954 film) =

1954 film by Mario Camerini

- American theatrical poster
- Directed by: Mario Camerini
- Written by: Franco Brusati; Mario Camerini; Ennio De Concini; Hugh Gray; Ben Hecht; Ivo Perilli; Irwin Shaw
- Based on: Odyssey by Homer
- Produced by: Dino De Laurentiis; Carlo Ponti
- Starring: Silvana Mangano; Kirk Douglas; Anthony Quinn; Rossana Podestà; Jacques Dumesnil; Daniel Ivernel; Sylvie
- Cinematography: Harold Rosson; Mario Bava (uncredited)
- Edited by: Leo Catozzo
- Music by: Alessandro Cicognini
- Production companies: Lux Film; Paramount Pictures; Producciones Ponti-de Laurentiis; Zénith Films
- Distributed by: Paramount Pictures (United States)
- Release dates: 6 October 1954 (Italy); October 1955 (United States)
- Running time: 117 minutes
- Countries: Italy; France; United States
- Languages: Italian; English
- Budget: ₤500 million (approximately $800,000)
- Box office: ₤1.8 billion (Italy)

Ulysses (Italian: Ulisse) is a 1954 fantasy adventure film based on Homer's epic poem Odyssey. The film is directed by Mario Camerini, who co-wrote the screenplay with writer Franco Brusati, and produced by Dino De Laurentiis and Carlo Ponti. It stars Kirk Douglas in the title role, Silvana Mangano in a dual role as Penelope and Circe, and Anthony Quinn as Antinous.

The film is an international co-production between Italy, France, and the United States. It premiered in Italy on October 6, 1954, and was released in the United States by Paramount Pictures the following year.

== Plot ==
The palace of Ulysses, king of Ithaca, is beleaguered by a horde of suitors wooing his wife Penelope after his failure to return from the Trojan War. Penelope has promised under pressure to marry one of them, who under the leadership of Antinous squander her husband's wealth and land. She holds them off by telling them she first wants to finish her tapestry, but she unweaves it every night to stall. Telemachus, the son of Ulysses and Penelope, is sick of the suitors' behavior and decides to search for his father.

On the nearby island of Phaeacia, royal princess Nausicaa and her handmaidens find a shipwrecked man washed up on the shore. Due to his ordeal, the stranger has lost his memory, not even remembering his name. He is taken in by Nausicaa's parents, King Alcinous and Queen Arete, and he and Nausicaa soon fall in love. On the day they are scheduled to be married, however, the stranger gradually regains his lost memories.

He remembers that he is Ulysses. He was lost at sea when his ship was blown off course in a storm during his return voyage to Ithaca as a consequence of his desecrating Neptune's temple during the sacking of Troy. Going ashore on an unknown island to forage for food, they intrude on the cave of the cyclops Polyphemus, who locks them inside and eats one of Ulysses' men. Upon the giant's complaint about the taste of human flesh, Ulysses suggests Polyphemus collect grapes to make wine. After Polyphemus leaves, Ulysses and his men prepare a stake to blind the cyclops after getting him drunk. The plan succeeds, and Ulysses tricks the blinded giant into removing the rock from the cave entrance, and the Greeks escape.

Later, Ulysses' ship passes the rock of the sirens. Eager to hear what they sound like, Ulysses has himself tied to the mast while his men plug their ears to resist their enchanting singing, and is tormented when the sirens speak to him with the voices of his family. After passing the rocks, a strange current pulls the ship towards another island. Leaving his men to explore, Ulysses returns to find them captured and transformed into pigs by the mistress of the island, the sorceress Circe. Circe, who has fallen in love with Ulysses after learning of his heroics, strives to keep him there, but Ulysses forces her to return his men to their original forms. Persuaded by Circe to stay for a while, he stirs resentment in his men, who want to return home. Ignoring Circe's warning that Neptune will strike them down if they leave, they set sail on their own and perish in a storm. Blaming Circe for allowing them to die and determined to return to his family, Ulysses begins building a raft. Circe tries to make him stay and enjoy eternal life by her side by calling forth the dead from the underworld, including Ulysses' crew and his comrades-in-arms from Troy. But then his recently deceased mother Anticlea appears, telling him of Penelope's plight. With Ulysses' resolve reaffirmed, the embittered Circe lets him go, daring him to defy Neptune's wrath.

With his memory fully restored, Ulysses reveals his identity and sets out for home, breaking Nausicaa's heart. Returning to his palace disguised as a beggar, he meets Penelope, pretending to be an old friend of her husband. He suggests that she hold a contest to determine the suitor who shall marry her: stringing Ulysses' hunting bow and shooting an arrow through a dozen, lined-up axe heads. As he turns to leave, he stops to pet his old hunting dog Argos. Telemachus, who has just returned, witnesses this, and he and Ulysses reveal themselves to each other before they embrace. They suddenly hear Penelope crying upstairs, to which Telemachus insists to his father that they should reveal his return, only to be told to wait for the right moment to strike against the suitors.

The next day, Penelope stages the archery contest, with Ulysses attending in his disguise. When the suitors are unable to even string the bow, Ulysses asks Penelope to let him try, reassuring her he is already married, and succeeds, thus revealing his identity. With the assistance of Telemachus and loyal servants, Ulysses locks down the feast hall and slays all the suitors.

After finishing the massacre, Ulysses comes upon Penelope praying to Athena over her fears of seeing how terrifying and murderous her husband has become. Ulysses remarks to his wife that there was no other way to return to her side, yet gently reassures Penelope they will be together forever from now on. The couple finally reunites as the narration describes Ulysses’ many heroic achievements.

== Cast ==
- Kirk Douglas as Ulysses
- Silvana Mangano as Penelope/Circe
- Anthony Quinn as Antinous
- Rossana Podestà as Nausicaa
- Jacques Dumesnil as Alcinous
- Daniel Ivernel as Eurylochus
- Sylvie as Eurycleia
- Franco Interlenghi as Telemachus
- Elena Zareschi as Cassandra
- Evi Maltagliati as Anticlea
- Ludmilla Dudarova as Arete
- Tania Weber as Leucantho
- Piero Lulli as Achilles
- Ferruccio Stagni as Mentor
- Alessandro Fersen as Diomedes
- Oscar Andriani as Calops
- Umberto Silvestri as Polyphemus/Krakos
- Gualtiero Tumiati as Laertes
- Teresa Pellati as Melantho
- Mario Feliciani as Eurymachus
- Michele Riccardini as Leodes
- Andrea Bosic as Agamemnon
- Andrea Aureli as Ctesippus
- Walter Brandi as Agelaus
- Daniele Dentice as Eurybates
- Piero Ghione as Amphimedon
- Renato Malavasi as Medon
- Piero Pastore as Leiocritus
- Goliarda Sapienza as Hermione
- Benito Stefanelli as Elatus
- Sergio Giovannucci as Polybus

== Production ==
The film was originally planned to be shot in 3D, and the original choice for director was Georg Wilhelm Pabst but he quit at the last minute. Mario Camerini, a director better known for domestic comedies, was hired in his stead. Mario Bava was hired to assist with the film's special effects, but wound up serving as a camera operator and uncredited co-cinematographer for the film's entire shoot. He also directed the cyclops segment, likewise uncredited.

Exteriors were filmed on-location throughout the Mediterranean and North Africa, while interiors were shot at Carlo Ponti/Dino De Laurentiis' studio in Rome. The film was shot with all the actors speaking their own languages, since it would be dubbed later. Kirk Douglas and Quinn did their own dubbing for the English version.

Kirk Douglas met his second wife Anne Buydens during filming.

== Release ==
The Italian version runs 26 minutes longer than the international cut.

== Reception ==
=== Box office ===
In Italy, the film was the highest grossing film of the 1954–1955 cinema season, grossing 1.8 billion lire.

=== Critical response ===
Reviews towards the film were lukewarm. On Rotten Tomatoes, the film holds a rating of 52% based on 56 reviews. The consensus summarizes: "Ulysses condenses Homer's epic into a visually sumptuous, but uneven adventure that can't overcome its muddled storytelling, stilted dialogue, and lack of truly heroic sweep."

In a review for the Orlando Sentinel, Jean Yothers called it "a fascinating trip into the age of enchantresses, gods and goddesses and witchcraft."

Based on the success of Ulysses, De Laurentiis and Ponti were able to secure a deal with Paramount to produce War and Peace the following year. The two share several of the same crew, and Mario Camerini was briefly attached to direct, but was replaced by King Vidor before shooting started.

== In popular culture ==
Alberto Moravia's 1954 novel Il disprezzo, better known in English as Contempt, was loosely based on his experiences working on this film as a script doctor. The novel was adapted to film by Jean-Luc Godard in 1963 as Contempt, and was produced by Ulysses producer Carlo Ponti. In the film, the director of the fictional Homerian epic is Fritz Lang (playing himself), another Austrian director of the 1920s and a contemporary of G. W. Pabst.

== See also ==
- List of historical drama films
- Greek mythology in popular culture
- Peplum (film genre)
