= Beauty of the World =

1927 film

- Directed by: Mario Almirante
- Written by: Pier Angelo Mazzolotti
- Starring: Italia Almirante-Manzini
- Cinematography: Antonio Cufaro
- Production company: Alba Film
- Release date: March 1927
- Country: Italy
- Language: Silent

Beauty of the World (Italian: La bellezza del mondo) is a 1927 Italian silent film directed by Mario Almirante. The film features an early onscreen performance from Vittorio De Sica.

== Cast ==
- Italia Almirante-Manzini
- Renato Cialente
- Luigi Almirante
- Nini Dinelli
- Vittorina Benvenuti
- Guglielmo Barnabò
- Vittorio De Sica

== Production ==
Beauty of the World was partially filmed in South America, with the cast and crew departing from Genoa on 3 June 1926 aboard the Principessa Jolanda.
