= Father for a Night =

1939 film directed by Mario Bonnard

- Italian: Papà per una notte
- Directed by: Mario Bonnard
- Written by: Jean de Letraz (play); Michele Galdieri; Tomaso Smith
- Starring: Sergio Tofano; Clelia Matania; Carlo Romano
- Cinematography: Otello Martelli
- Edited by: Eraldo Da Roma
- Music by: Giulio Bonnard; Carlo Rustichelli
- Production company: Scalera Film
- Distributed by: Scalera Film
- Release date: 7 August 1939
- Running time: 80 minutes
- Country: Italy
- Language: Italian

Father for a Night (Italian: Papà per una notte) is a 1939 Italian "white-telephones" romantic comedy film directed by Mario Bonnard and starring Sergio Tofano, Clelia Matania, and Carlo Romano.

It was shot at the Scalera Studios in Rome. The film's sets were designed by the art director Gustav Abel.

== Cast ==
- Sergio Tofano as Edmondo Fontages
- Clelia Matania as Luisa
- Carlo Romano as Agostino
- Leonardo Cortese as Jacques Fontages
- Gemma Bolognesi as Henriette Fontages
- Ugo Ceseri as Pietro Gambier
- Rosetta Tofano as Marietta
- Barbara Nardi as Lulù
- Jone Romano as Zia Paolina
- Giuseppe Luigi Mariani as L'ispettore del fisco
- Aleardo Ward as Il cameriere
- Carola Lotti as La cameriera
- Aristide Garbini as L'autista
- Titì as a baby
