= Non è vero... ma ci credo =

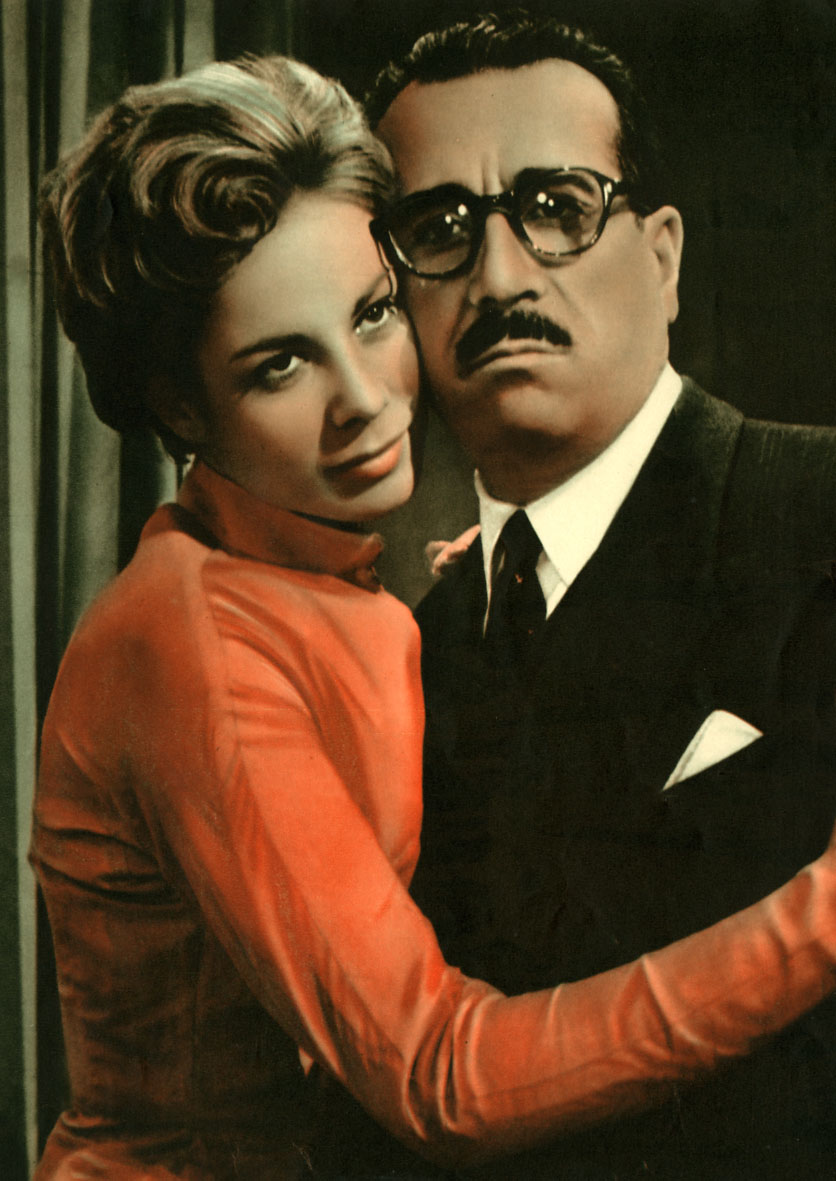
- Liliana Bonfatti and Peppino De Filippo in Non è vero... ma ci credo
- Directed by: Sergio Grieco
- Written by: Peppino De Filippo
- Produced by: Ottavio Poggi
- Starring: Peppino De Filippo; Liliana Bonfatti; Titina De Filippo
- Cinematography: Vincenzo Seratrice
- Edited by: Antonietta Zita
- Music by: Franco D'Acchiardi
- Production companies: Associati Produttori Indipendenti Film; Gladio Film
- Release date: 1952
- Country: Italy
- Language: Italian

Non è vero... ma ci credo ("It isn't is true... but I believe it") is a 1952 Italian comedy film directed by Sergio Grieco.

== Plot ==
A young man in love with a girl whose father does not approve of him, and who is also his employer, disguises himself as a hunchback to get into the father's good graces.

== Cast ==
- Peppino De Filippo
- Titina De Filippo
- Lidia Martora
- Luigi De Filippo
- Guglielmo Inglese
- Pietro Carloni
- Tamara D'Oria
- Liliana Bonfatti
- Carlo Croccolo
- Jole Farnese
- Nicola Manzari
- Rosita Pisano
