= Marisa Maresca =

Marisa Maresca (17 July 1923 - 18 August 1988) was an Italian showgirl, soubrette, and theatre dancer. Her mother was also a soubrette, her father was an impresario, and her uncle sang operettas. Her sister Lydia Maresca, herself an actress with the stage name Lidia Martora, was the wife of Peppino De Filippo. In 1938, at the age of 15, Maresca joined the company of Erminio Macario, becoming one of the comedy performers in Turin. Over the next decade, she worked with Carlo Dapporto, where, in imitation of Josephine Baker, Maresca appeared on stage in a thong and bra of bananas. In other shows, she performed topless, while in still others, she wore only the heads of three black foxes to cover the appropriate areas. In 1946, she created her own company, and a few months later, she took on a young novice comedian, Walter Chiari, with whom she began a relationship. In 1950, she retired from acting to marry Count Corrado Agusta, owner (with his brothers) of Agusta; they had a son, Richard, nicknamed Rocky. Maresca's husband left her for Francesca Vacca Graffagni.
