= Princess Cinderella =

- Directed by: Sergio Tofano
- Written by: Edoardo Anton; Vittorio Metz; Sergio Tofano
- Starring: Paolo Stoppa; Silvana Jachino
- Cinematography: Manfredo Bertini
- Music by: Renzo Rossellini
- Distributed by: Variety Distribution
- Release date: 1941
- Country: Italy
- Language: Italian

Princess Cinderella (Italian: Cenerentola e il signor Bonaventura) is a 1941 Italian fantasy-comedy film written and directed by Sergio Tofano. It is based on the characters of the popular comic strip series Signor Bonaventura, created in 1917 by the same Tofano for the children magazine Corriere dei Piccoli.

== Plot ==
After her marriage to Prince Charming, Cinderella spends her days in their luxurious palace, keeping his affability with all the people around her, but her two stepsisters, always envious of her, manage to get her away from the palace. The Prince falls into a state of despair, but Bonaventura promises him to go in search of the girl and bring her back. After fighting bitter enemies such as Barbariccia and the Ogre, helped by the loyal Cecè and by the Little Fairy he will finally succeed.

== Cast ==
- Paolo Stoppa as Bonaventura
- Silvana Jachino as Cinderella
- Roberto Villa as Prince Charming
- Sergio Tofano as the Doctor
- Guglielmo Barnabò as the King
- Rosetta Tofano as Pasqualina
- Mercedes Brignone as the Queen
- Piero Carnabuci as Barbariccia
- Mario Pisu as Cecè
- Camillo Pilotto as the Ogre
- Renato Chiantoni as Gambamoscia
- Amelia Chellini as the Witch
- Nais Lago as the Good Fairy
