= Beggar's Wedding =

1936 film

- Directed by: Guido Brignone
- Written by: Oreste Biancoli; Guido Brignone; Fritz Eckardt; Dino Falconi
- Starring: Maurizio D'Ancora; Leda Gloria; Luigi Almirante
- Cinematography: Anchise Brizzi
- Edited by: Giuseppe Fatigati
- Music by: Nino Ravasini
- Production company: Stereocinematografia
- Distributed by: Warner Brothers
- Release date: 30 June 1936
- Running time: 81 minutes
- Country: Italy
- Language: Italian

Beggar's Wedding (Italian: Nozze vagabonde) is a 1936 Italian comedy film directed by Guido Brignone and starring Maurizio D'Ancora, Leda Gloria and Luigi Almirante. It featured an early form of 3D film. It was shot at the Cines Studios and Caesar Studios in Rome. The film's sets were designed by the art director Giulio Lombardozzi. It was distributed by the Italian branch of Warner Brothers.

== Cast ==
- Maurizio D'Ancora as Umberto Tappi
- Leda Gloria as Diana
- Ernes Zacconi as Laura
- Luigi Almirante as Il padre di Laura
- Gemma Schirato as La mamma di Laura
- Ugo Ceseri as Alberto Magni
- Silvana Jachino
- Liarosa Leoncini
- Silvia Manto
- Fernanda Salvi
- Gina Spicchiesi
- Ermete Tamberlani

== Bibliography ==
- Zone, Ray. Stereoscopic Cinema and the Origins of 3-D Film, 1838-1952. University Press of Kentucky, 2014.
