= Rosetta Tofano =

Italian costume designer and film actor

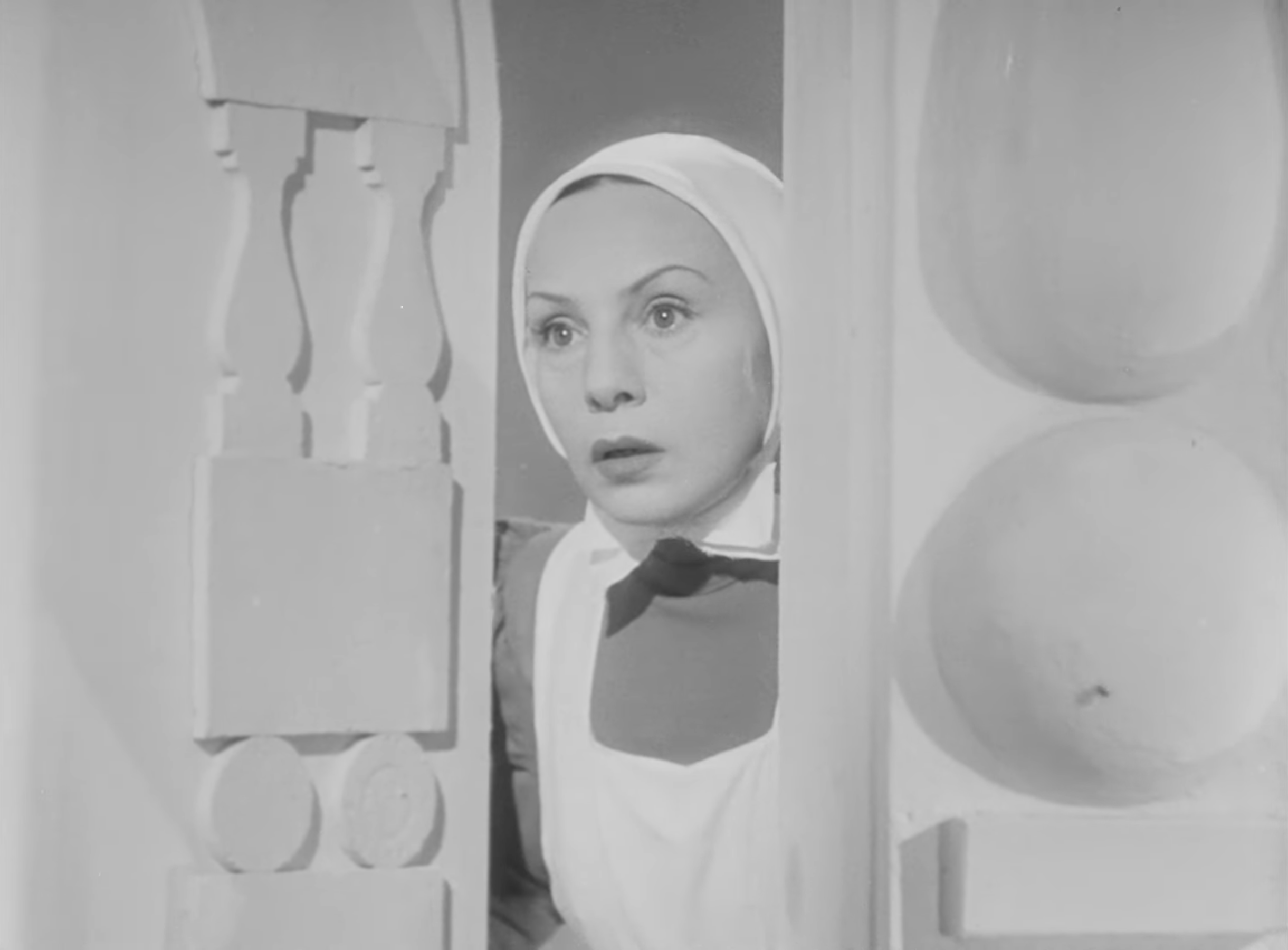
- Tofano in Princess Cinderella (1941)
- Born: Rosa Cavallari; 5 March 1902; Milan, Lombardy; Italy
- Died: 7 April 1960 (aged 58); Rome, Lazio; Italy
- Occupation: Actress
- Years active: 1932–1943
- Spouse: Sergio Tofano (m. 1923)
- Children: 1

Rosetta Tofano (1902–1960) was an Italian costume designer and film star. She was a noted Costumier for the stage and films. In 1923 she met and married Sergio Tofano. She made her film debut in the lead role in the 1932 film Your Money or Your Life and made several further appearances over the next decade.

== Selected filmography ==
- Your Money or Your Life (1932)
- Father For a Night (1939)
- Two on a Vacation (1940)
- Princess Cinderella (1941)

== Bibliography ==
- Goble, Alan. The Complete Index to Literary Sources in Film. Walter de Gruyter, 1999.
