= It Was I! =

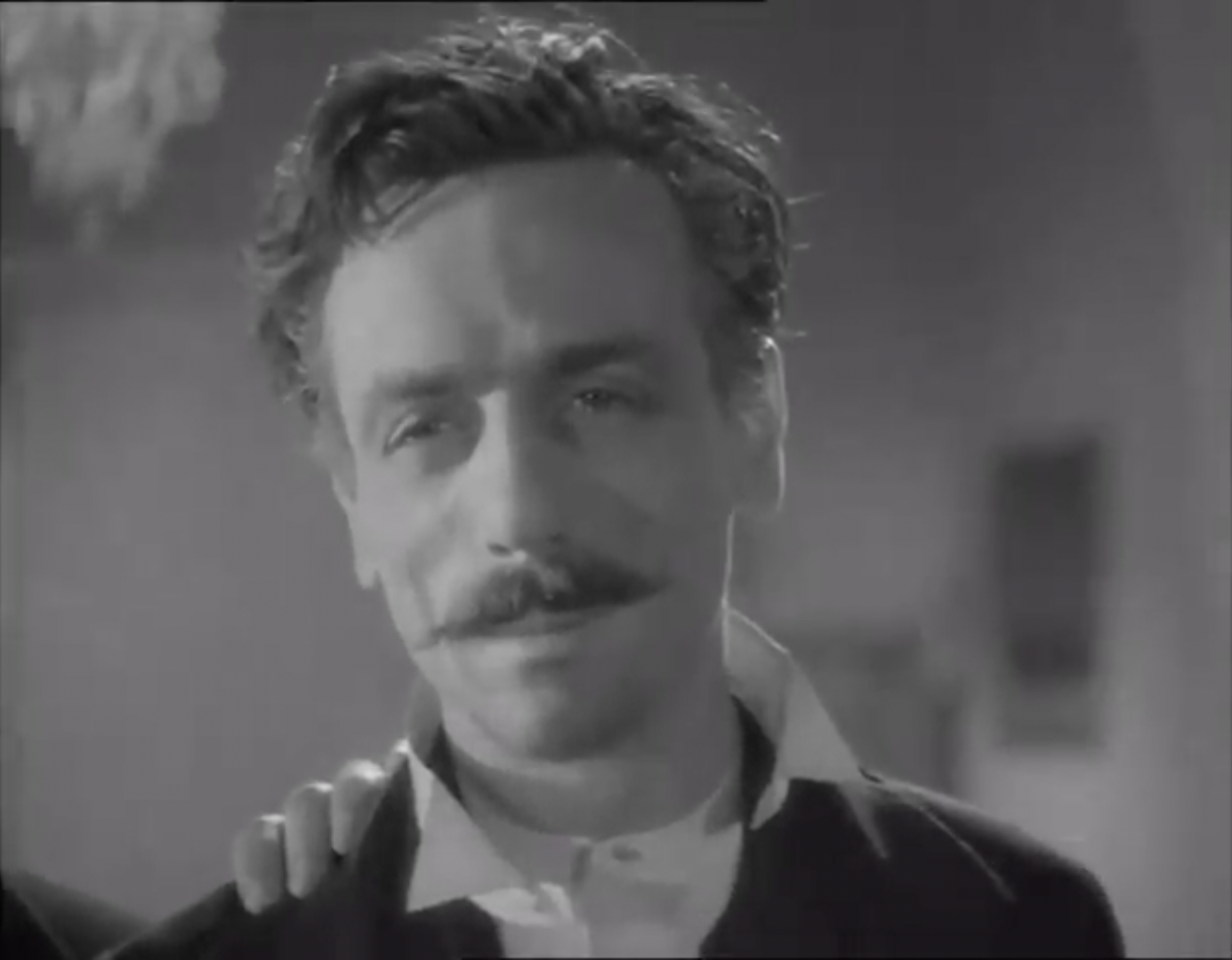
- Still from the movie
- Directed by: Raffaello Matarazzo
- Written by: Roberto Bracco (play); Paola Riccora (play); Giuseppe Amato; Raffaello Matarazzo
- Produced by: Giuseppe Amato
- Starring: Eduardo De Filippo; Peppino De Filippo; Titina De Filippo; Isa Pola
- Cinematography: Václav Vích
- Edited by: Eraldo Da Roma
- Music by: Cesare A. Bixio
- Production company: Amato Film
- Distributed by: E.I.A.
- Release date: 1937
- Running time: 72 minutes
- Country: Italy
- Language: Italian

It Was I! (Italian: Sono stato io!) is a 1937 Italian comedy film directed by Raffaello Matarazzo and starring Eduardo De Filippo, Peppino De Filippo and Titina De Filippo. The film was based on a play, Sarà stato Giovannino by Paola Riccora.

It was shot at the Tirrenia Studios. The film's sets were designed by the art director Virgilio Marchi.

== Cast ==
- Eduardo De Filippo as Giovannino Apicella
- Peppino De Filippo as Carlino
- Titina De Filippo as Donna Rosa
- Isa Pola as Lisa
- Alida Valli as Lauretta
- Federico Collino as Matteo
- Lina Gennari as Fiammetta
- Tecla Scarano as Fiammetta's mother
- Silvio Bagolini
- Calisto Bertramo
- Corrado De Cenzo
- Silvana Jachino
- Armando Migliari
- Dina Perbellini
- Albino Principe
- Mirella Scriatto
- Guglielmo Sinaz
- Vinicio Sofia
- Marisa Vernati

== Bibliography ==
- Moliterno, Gino. Historical Dictionary of Italian Cinema. Scarecrow Press, 2008.
