= Pietro Carloni =

Italian actor (1896–1968)

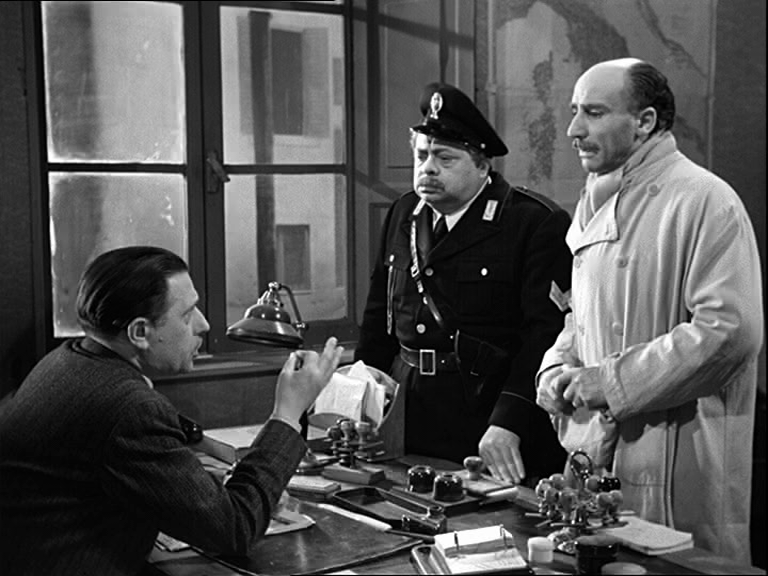
- Pietro Carloni (left), Aldo Fabrizi and Mario Castellani in Cops and Robbers (1951)
- Born: 28 October 1896; Taurisano, Italy
- Died: 3 August 1968 (aged 71); Rome, Italy
- Occupation: Actor
- Spouse: Titina De Filippo
- Children: Augusto Carloni
- Relatives: Ester Carloni (sister); Peppino De Filippo (brother-in-law); Eduardo De Filippo (brother-in-law)

Pietro Carloni (28 October 1896 – 3 August 1968) was an Italian stage and film actor.

== Life and career ==
Born in Taurisano, Lecce into a family of actors, Carloni debuted on stage at young age in the theatrical company held by Ernesto Murolo.

In 1921, he met on stage Titina De Filippo, whom he married one year later and with whom he started a long professional association, appearing in almost all her stage works.

Carloni was also active in films and in television miniseries, mainly cast in character roles. His siblings Ester, Maria, Adelina and Ettore were fellow actors. His sister Adelina (or Adele) Carloni married his wife Titina's brother Peppino De Filippo. Well-known actor Eduardo De Filippo was another of his wife's siblings.

== Partial filmography ==
- Assunta Spina (1948) – Il presidente del tribunale (uncredited)
- Side Street Story (1950) – Un soldato americano
- Filumena Marturano (1951)
- Cops and Robbers (1951) – The Police Commissioner
- La macchina ammazzacattivi (1952)
- Deceit (1952) – Un commissario di polizia
- Five Paupers in an Automobile (1952) – Fabio Mazzetti
- Toto and the King of Rome (1952) – Capoufficio Capasso
- Non è vero... ma ci credo (1952) – Avvocato Donati
- I morti non pagano tasse (1952)
- Cats and Dogs (1952) – Cav. Anselmi
- Piovuto dal cielo (1953) – Ricco signore
- Martin Toccaferro (1953)
- It Happened at the Police Station (1954) – Deputy Police Commissioner
- Too Bad She's Bad (1954) – Il signore intrigante
- A Hero of Our Times (1955) (uncredited)
- The Two Friends (1955) – Commissario
- Roman Tales (1955) – The Restaurant Manager (uncredited)
- Da qui all'eredità (1955)
- Susanna tutta panna (1957)
- Carmela è una bambola (1958) – The Judge
- Sogno di una notte di mezza sbornia (1959) – Il dottore
- Lo smemorato di Collegno (1962) – Francesco Ballarini
- The Four Monks (1962) – Il fruttivendolo
- Toto vs. the Four (1963) – Cognato di Lancetti
- Toto and Cleopatra (1963) – Lepido
- Toto vs. the Black Pirate (1964) – Il governatore
- Bianco, rosso, giallo, rosa (1964)
- Made in Italy (1965) – The Judge (segment "2 'Il Lavoro', episode 2")
- More Than a Miracle (1967) – (final film role)
