= Napoli milionaria (opera) =

1977 opera by Nino Rota

Napoli milionaria is an opera in three acts composed by Nino Rota to an Italian libretto by Eduardo De Filippo based on his 1945 play of the same name that was also made into the 1950 film Side Street Story. Conducted by Bruno Bartoletti, the opera premiered at the Teatro Caio Melisso in Spoleto on 22 June 1977 as part of the Festival dei Due Mondi.
