= Tania Weber =

Finnish actress (1926–2009)

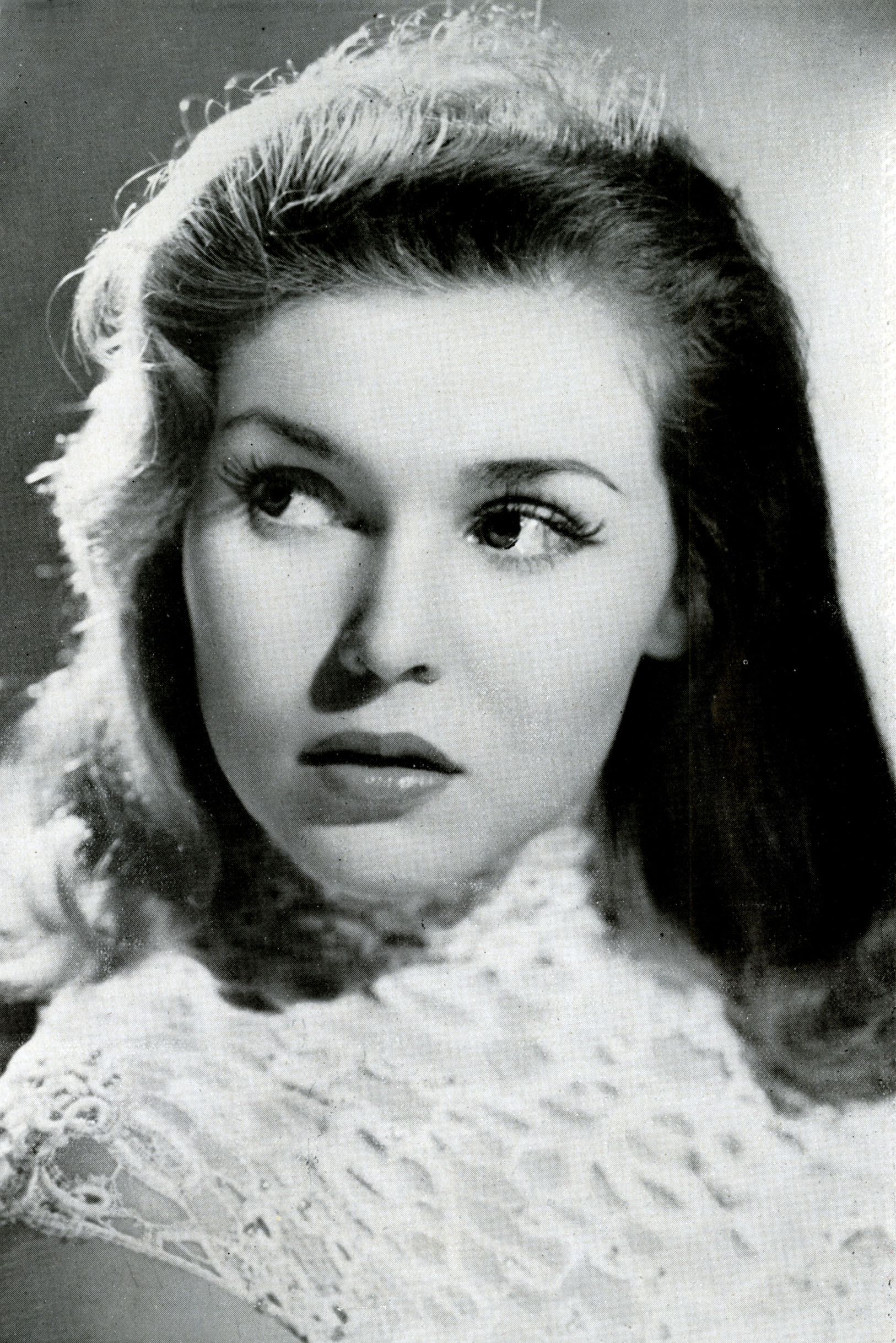
- Weber in 1954
- Born: Tanja Sarsgardeer; 18 August 1926; Helsinki, Finland
- Died: 20 November 2009 (aged 83); Rome, Italy
- Occupation: Actress
- Years active: 1950s

Tanja Sarsgardeer (18 August 1926 – 20 November 2009), better known by her stage name Tania Weber, was a Finnish actress, best known for her many roles in 1950s Italian films.

Weber was born in Helsinki, Finland on 18 August 1926. She died in Rome, Italy on 20 November 2009, aged 83.

== Filmography ==
- Heroic Charge (1952) — as Kalina Ifienov
- Roman Holiday (1953) — as Francesca (uncredited)
- The Unfaithfuls (1953) — as L'amica di Lulla
- The Ship of Condemned Women (1953) — as Isabella
- Siamo tutti inquilini (1953) — as Lulù
- Funniest Show on Earth (1953) — as Sonia
- A Day in Court (1954) — as Elena
- Ulysses (1954) — as Leucantes
