= Nais Lago =

Italian actress (1914–1983)

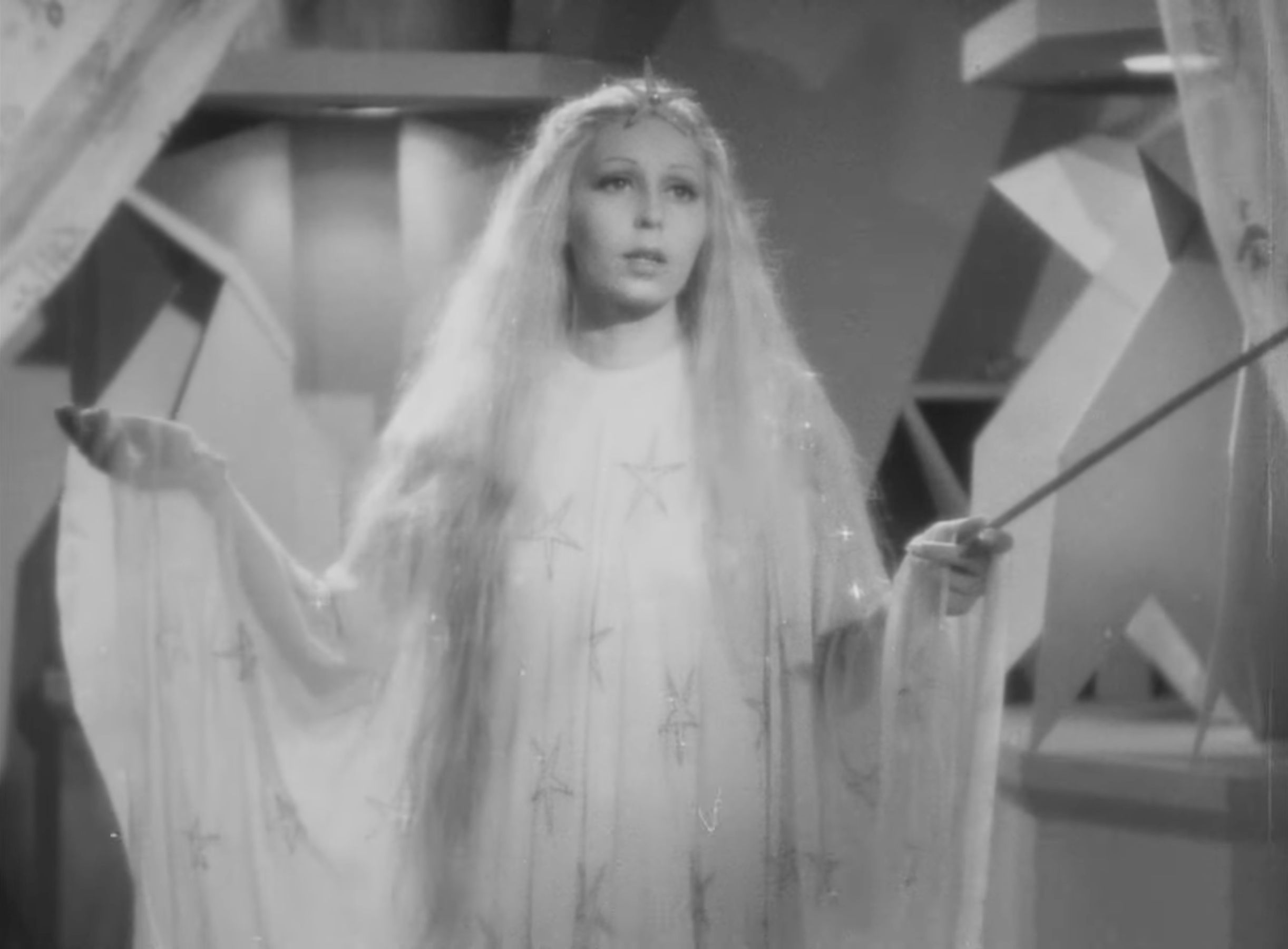
- Lago in Princess Cinderella (1941)
- Born: 25 February 1914; Fiume, Austria-Hungary
- Died: 10 January 1983 (aged 68); Rome, Italy
- Occupation: Actress

Nais Lago (25 February 1914 – 10 January 1983) was an Italian actress.

== Life and career ==
Born Nais La Gattella in Rijeka (at the time called Fiume), after studying in Trieste she moved to Rome, where she made her film debut appearing in two minor roles in Goffredo Alessandrini Seconda B and Alessandro Blasetti's 1860. Lago later attended the Centro Sperimentale di Cinematografia, graduating in 1936. She then devoted herself to the theater, entering the major stage companies of the time. She was also active in films, even if usually cast in character roles, and on television. Lago died in Rome on 10 January 1983, at the age of 68.
