= Luigi Almirante =

Italian actor (1884–1963)

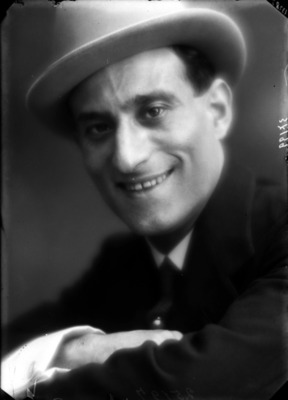
- Born: 30 September 1886; Tunis, French protectorate of Tunisia
- Died: 6 May 1963 (aged 76); Rome, Italy
- Occupation: Actor
- Years active: 1921–1955

Luigi Almirante (30 September 1884 – 6 May 1963) was an Italian stage and film actor. He appeared in 62 films between 1921 and 1955.

== Life and career ==
The son of a stage actor, Almirante was born in Tunis, where the theatrical company of his father was touring at the time. He debuted on stage aged 14 years old.

Active in humorous roles since 1907, Almirante had his acting breakthrough in 1909 with the "Grand Guignol" stage company directed by Alfredo Sainati. During the World War I, he served at the Soldier's Theatre in Udine, under Renato Simoni. After the war, he was part of the Antonio Gandusio company for three years, and then joined the Theater Company Niccodemi, staying there until 1923.

In 1925 Almirante formed with his cousin Italia Almirante Manzini a stage company which lengthy toured with some success in the United States. In 1928, he formed a company together with Giuditta Rissone and Sergio Tofano, and in 1931, he established a short-lived company with Andreina Pagnani and Nino Besozzi. Starting from 1932, he gradually focused in films, even if mainly cast in supporting and character roles. He was also active as a teacher at the Accademia d'Arte Drammatica, a voice actor and a dubber.

== Selected filmography ==
- Tra fumi di champagne (1921)
- Beauty of the World (1927)
- Your Money or Your Life (1932) - Giovanni Bensi the Friend of Daniele
- Non sono gelosa (1933) - Edoardo
- Non c'è bisogno di denaro (1933) - Lecomtois
- Il presidente della Ba.Ce.Cre.Mi. (1933) - Commendator Mandragola
- Those Two (1935) - Gelsomino
- I'll Give a Million (1935) - Blim
- Territorial Militia (1936) - Salvatore Reani
- Beggar's Wedding (1936) - Il padre di Laura
- The Dance of Time (1936) - Il conte di Aragona
- Ginevra degli Almieri (1936) - Notaro dello Scheggia
- Lohengrin (1936) - Edmondo
- Gli uomini non sono ingrati (1937) - Avvocato Laszlo Tomay
- Departure (1938) - Baldassare - il nonno
- L'argine (1938) - Il maestrino
- Star of the Sea (1938) - Nino Rossetti
- Heartbeat (1939) - Il professore Teofilo Comte
- The Dream of Butterfly (1939) - Riccardo Belli
- Cavalleria rusticana (1939) - Zio Brasi
- L'amore si fa così (1939) - Gastone Merchant
- Processo e morte di Socrate (1939) - Il cerusico che prepara la cicuta
- Un mare di guai (1939) - Zio Chenerol
- Le sorprese del vagone letto (1940) - Il padre
- Una lampada alla finestra (1940) - Il professore Aurelio Burlando
- Il ponte dei sospiri (1940)
- Alessandro sei grande! (1940) - Pasquale Dell'Incanto
- Boccaccio (1940) - Maestro Scalza
- Love Me, Alfredo! (1940) - Romanelli
- Lucrezia Borgia (1940) - Il giullare
- Miseria e nobiltà (1940) - Il barone
- Saint John, the Beheaded (1940) - Renato (uncredited)
- L'elisir d'amore (1941) - Il notaio
- Il pozzo dei miracoli (1941) - Il padre di Huzzar
- The Secret Lover (1941) - Il pittore Riganti
- First Love (1941) - Girolamo Redi
- Il vagabondo (1941) - Cresima
- I Live as I Please (1942) - L'impresario
- Invisible Chains (1942) - Un amico dei Silvagni
- Arriviamo noi! (1942) - Benvenuto Delfino
- Una notte dopo l'opera (1942) - L'impresario Mauri
- Cercasi bionda bella presenza (1942) - Anacleto
- L'affare si complica (1942)
- Quarta pagina (1942)
- Harlem (1943) - Barney Palmer
- Sempre più difficile (1943) - Il commendator Murrita
- I nostri sogni (1943) - Ladislao Moscapelli
- In cerca di felicità (1944) - Miguel Morales
- The Priest's Hat (1944) - Don Cirillo, il prete
- My Widow and I (1945) - Il custode del cimitero
- The Song of Life (1945) - Il vecchio Po
- 07... Tassì (1945)
- Voglio bene soltanto a te! (1946) - Paolo Rossi
- Crime News (1947)
- Vanity (1947) - Anselmo
- The Two Orphans (1947) - Il boia di Parigi
- Un mese d'onestà (1948)
- Mad About Opera (1948) - Il notaio
- Vento d'Africa (1949)
- Miss Italia (1950) - Cav. Minneci
- Rome-Paris-Rome (1951) - Professor Busi Migliavacca
- Messalina (1951) - Il gioielliere / Le joallier
- The Last Five Minutes (1955) - Segretario del cardinale (final film role)
