= Your Money or Your Life (1932 film) =

1933 film

- Directed by: Carlo Ludovico Bragaglia
- Written by: Alessandro De Stefani; Gino Mazzucchi; Carlo Ludovico Bragaglia
- Starring: Sergio Tofano; Rosetta Tofano; Luigi Almirante; Cesare Zoppetti
- Cinematography: Carlo Montuori
- Edited by: Fernando Tropea
- Music by: Vittorio Rieti
- Production company: Società Italiana Cines
- Distributed by: Cinès-Pittaluga
- Release date: 31 December 1932
- Running time: 71 minutes
- Country: Italy
- Language: Italian

Your Money or Your Life (Italian: O la borsa o la vita) is a 1932 Italian comedy film directed by Carlo Ludovico Bragaglia and starring Sergio Tofano, Rosetta Tofano and Luigi Almirante. It was made at the Cines Studios in Rome.

The film's art direction was by Gastone Medin.

== Cast ==
- Sergio Tofano as Daniele
- Rosetta Tofano as Renata
- Luigi Almirante as Giovanni Bensi
- Cesare Zoppetti as Tommaso
- Lamberto Picasso as Anarchic
- Mara Dussia as Lady with dog
- Mario Siletti
- Mario Ferrari
- Giovanni Lombardi
- Eugenio Duse
- Giovanni Ferrari
- Mario De Bernardi

== Bibliography ==
- Moliterno, Gino. Historical Dictionary of Italian Cinema. Scarecrow Press, 2008. ISBN 1538119471.
