= Signor Bonaventura =

Italian comic strip

Il Signor Bonaventura

Publication information
- Format: Text comics
- Genre: Humor/comedy

Signor Bonaventura is an Italian comic strip created in 1917 by actor and playwright Sergio Tofano. It is considered among the most famous and successful comic strips ever created in Italy.

The character made his first appearance on October 28, 1917, in the issue 43 of the Corriere dei Piccoli, the supplement for children of Corriere della Sera. It was a full-page comic strip composed of eight vignettes, each accompanied by a text in verse.

From that moment Bonaventura appeared continuously every week for 26 years, until 1943. After the war publications were resumed, only to be reduced gradually during the fifties and to be discontinued in the sixties.

Then, after the death of Tofano, the character was taken over by his son, Gilberto Tofano, and by cartoonist Carlo Peroni.

Most of the adventures of Signor Bonaventura end with him receiving a 1-million (and, later, 1-billion) lire check for various reasons. This is lampshaded by his name itself, whose etymology comes from "bona", which means "good", and "ventura", which (in this context) means "things to come"; see the page on the Italian Wikipedia about the Bonaventura (given name) for further details on the etymology. "Signor" simply refers to the male gender of the character, thus literally meaning "mister".

== Media ==
Signor Bonaventura was protagonist of several plays written and performed by Sergio Tofano between 1927 and 1953. The character was also adapted by Paolo Poli in 1966 in the play Un milione. In 1941 the same Tofano directed a film adaptation of the comic strips, Princess Cinderella (Cenerentola e il signor Bonaventura), in which the main character was played by Paolo Stoppa.

== Sources ==
- Boschesi, B.P. (1976). Manuale dei fumetti (in Italian). Mondadori. pp. 20, 28–29.
- Fossati, Franco (1990). I grandi eroi del fumetto. Gramese. pp. 55–56.
