= Silvana Jachino =

Italian actress (1916–2004)

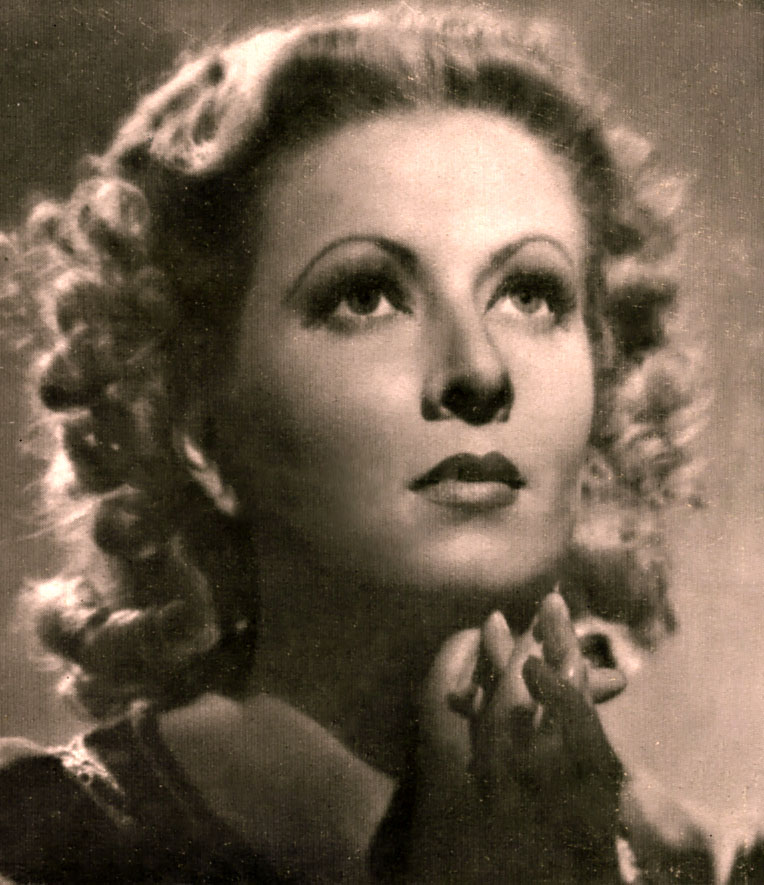
- Jachino in the movie The King of England Will Not Pay (1941)
- Born: 2 February 1916; Milan, Kingdom of Italy
- Died: 28 August 2004 (aged 88); Rimini, Italy
- Occupation: Actress
- Years active: 1936–1970

Silvana Jachino (2 February 1916 – 28 August 2004) was an Italian film actress. She appeared in 65 films between 1936 and 1970.

== Partial filmography ==
- Cuor di vagabondo (1936)
- Beggar's Wedding (1936)
- Cavalry (1936) - Carlotta di Frasseneto
- Fiordalisi d'oro (1936) - Agnese di Fitz-James
- Bertoldo, Bertoldino e Cacasenno (1937) - Principessa Fiorella
- It Was I! (1937)
- Gatta ci cova (1937) - Iole - la figlia di Antonia
- The Black Corsair (1938) - Honorata
- Ballerine (1938)
- Departure (1938) - Mimì
- Battles in the Shadow (1938) - Dora
- L'ultimo scugnizzo (1938) - Antonio's girlfriend
- Crispino e la comare (1938) - La marchesina
- Lancieri di Savoia (1939)
- Fascino (1939) - Liliana
- Il ladro (1939) - Nelly
- We Were Seven Widows (1939) - Barbara
- L'aria del continente (1939)
- The Boarders at Saint-Cyr (1939) - Gemmina Merian
- Diario di una stella (1940)
- The Thrill of the Skies (1940) - Maria
- Boccaccio (1940) - Fiammetta
- Eternal Melodies (1940)
- Saint John, the Beheaded (1940) - Serafina Miciacio
- Non me lo dire! (1940) - Luisella
- The King of England Will Not Pay (1941) - Dianora dei Bardi
- Princess Cinderella (1941) - Cenerentola [Cinderella]
- I Live as I Please (1942) - Maria
- C'è un fantasma nel castello (1942) - La baronessina, sua figlia
- L'affare si complica (1942)
- Charley's Aunt (1943) - Rina
- Senza una donna (1943) - Marta
- Lettere al sottotenente (1945) - La ragazza graziosa
- Fire Over the Sea (1947) - Diana La Spina
- L'isola del sogno (1947) - Eva Fuller
- Sono io l'assassino (1948)
- Il corriere di ferro (1948) - Elda
- Fabiola (1949) - Lucilla
- Return to Naples (1949)
- I peggiori anni della nostra vita (1949) - Rosetta
- Accidents to the Taxes!! (1951) - Signora Penna
- My Heart Sings (1951) - Cameriera
- Catalina de Inglaterra (1951)
- Sardinian Vendetta (1952) - Guardarobiera
- Five Paupers in an Automobile (1952) - La segretaria del salone auto
- Nero and the Burning of Rome (1953) - Eunike
- Martin Toccaferro (1953)
- Condannata senza colpa (1953) - La madre superiora
- Anna perdonami (1953)
- Mizar (Sabotaggio in mare) (1954)
- The White Angel (1955) - La detenuta bionda
- The Last Five Minutes (1955) - La cameriera
- The Window to Luna Park (1957) - The teacher (uncredited)
- Esterina (1959) - Padrona di casa
- Julius Caesar Against The Pirates (1962) - Quintilia - Valerio's Daughter
- Full Hearts and Empty Pockets (1964) - la proprietaria della pensione
- Juliet of the Spirits (1965) - Dolores
- Password: Kill Agent Gordon (1966)
- Formula 1: Nell'Inferno del Grand Prix (1970) - Giacomo's Mother
- La modification (1970) - Mme De Monte
