= The Last Five Minutes =

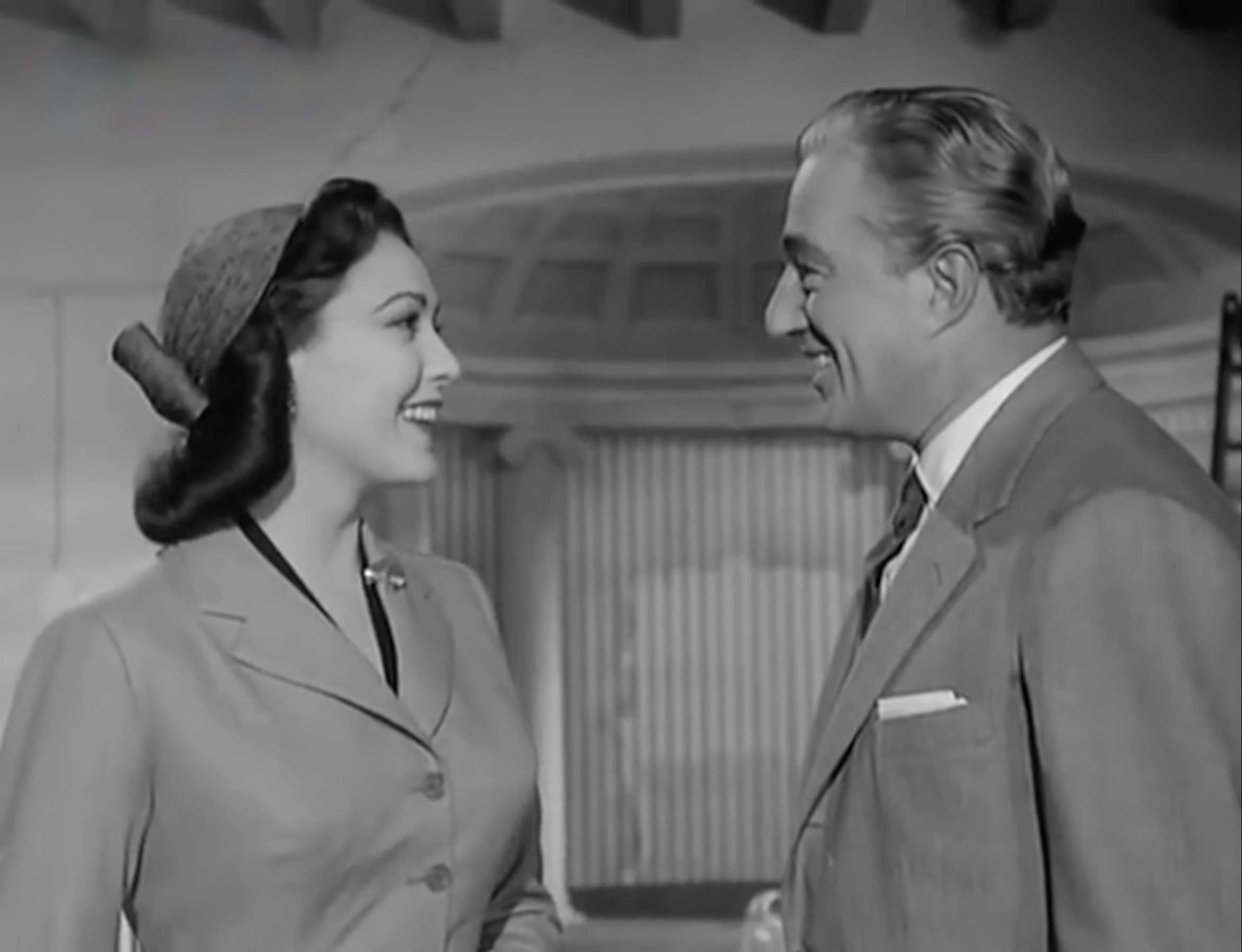
- Darnell and De Sica in a film scene
- Directed by: Giuseppe Amato
- Written by: Aldo De Benedetti; Oreste Biancoli
- Produced by: Giuseppe Amato
- Starring: Linda Darnell; Vittorio De Sica; Peppino De Filippo
- Cinematography: Carlo Montuori
- Edited by: Eraldo Da Roma
- Music by: Alessandro Cicognini
- Production companies: Excelsa Film; Omnium International du Film
- Distributed by: Minerva Film
- Release date: 25 May 1955
- Running time: 89 minutes
- Countries: France; Italy
- Language: Italian

The Last Five Minutes (Italian: Gli ultimi cinque minuti) is a 1955 French-Italian comedy film directed by Giuseppe Amato and starring Linda Darnell, Vittorio De Sica and Peppino De Filippo. It is also known by the alternative title of It Happens in Roma.

The film's art direction was by Guido Fiorini.

== Plot ==
In the post-World War II Vittorio De Sica as Carlo Reani is looking for an apartment and finds the perfect one, but Linda Darnell as Renata Adorni is being shown the apartment at the same time. They both decide to obtain it but bump into each other with their realtors and a dispute begins as to who has a right to the apartment as Renata says it is hers as she has sent in a contract. They send their realtors racing to get it and bring their luggage back first, but they return at the same time. However Carlo proposes marriage to Renata and she accepts and they end up getting it together.

== Cast ==
- Linda Darnell as Renata Adorni
- Vittorio De Sica as Carlo Reani
- Peppino De Filippo as Filippo Roberti
- Rossano Brazzi as Dino Moriani
- Nadia Gray as Valeria Roberti, moglie di Filippo
- Sophie Desmarets as La duchessa Isabella Camporese
- Pierre Cressoy as Dagoberto
- Elsa Merlini as Amica del pianista
- Gianrico Tedeschi as Il pianista
- Georges Bréhat as L'attore francese
- Memmo Carotenuto as Operaio dell'ascensore
- Henri Vidon as Un cardinale
- Nando Bruno as Il portiere
- Enrico Viarisio as Francesco, il maggiordomo
- Silvana Jachino as La cameriera
- Luigi Almirante as Segretario del cardinale
- Lise Bourdin

== Production ==
It is based on a play by Aldo De Benedetti, who also contributed to the screenplay.

Filming took place between February and March 1955. It was shot in Rome, with one scene filmed at Lake Bracciano.

== Reception ==
Leo Pestelli of La Stampa wrote of the film: "Clearly theatrical and rather contrived, the little film possesses a certain bite, thanks to its spirited dialogue and a rich, well-balanced cast that plays off the two charming leads [...]"

== Bibliography ==
- Davis, Ronald L. (2001-04-01). Hollywood Beauty: Linda Darnell and the American Dream. University of Oklahoma Press. ISBN 978-0-8061-3330-0.
