= Martin Toccaferro =

1953 film

- Directed by: Leonardo De Mitri
- Written by: Achille Campanile; Mino Doletti; Enzo La Rosa; Paola Ojetti; Cesare Rivelli
- Starring: Peppino De Filippo; Titina De Filippo; Wanda Osiris
- Cinematography: Carlo Bellero
- Edited by: Maria Rosada
- Music by: Gino Filippini
- Production company: Alfio-Amore Film
- Release date: 5 October 1953
- Running time: 100 minutes
- Country: Italy
- Language: Italian

Martin Toccaferro is a 1953 Italian comedy film directed by Leonardo De Mitri and starring Peppino De Filippo, Titina De Filippo and Wanda Osiris.

== Cast ==
- Peppino De Filippo as Martino Lazzari
- Titina De Filippo as Miss Costanzi
- Wanda Osiris as Miss Baroni
- Umberto Spadaro as Mr. Costanzi
- Angelika Hauff as Marilu Costanzi
- Ave Ninchi
- Umberto Melnati
- Irene Genna
- Andreina Paul
- Virgilio Riento
- Lauro Gazzolo
- Silvana Jachino
- Nerio Bernardi
- Felga Lauri
- Arturo Bragaglia
- Mario Cappello
- Giuseppe Marzari
- Anna Maria Lupi
- Enrico Viarisio
- Cesare Bettarini
- Clara Bindi
- Nino Milano
- Carlo Tusco
- Franco Ruggeri
- Olga Michilli
- Lia Angeleri
- Enrico Ardizzone
- Alberto Sorrentino
- Silvana Stefanini
- Amleto Pannocchia
- Pietro Carloni
- Gianna Cobelli
- Arnaldo Bertelli

== Bibliography ==
- Goble, Alan. The Complete Index to Literary Sources in Film. Walter de Gruyter, 1999.
