= Ester Carloni =

Italian actress (c. 1904–1996)

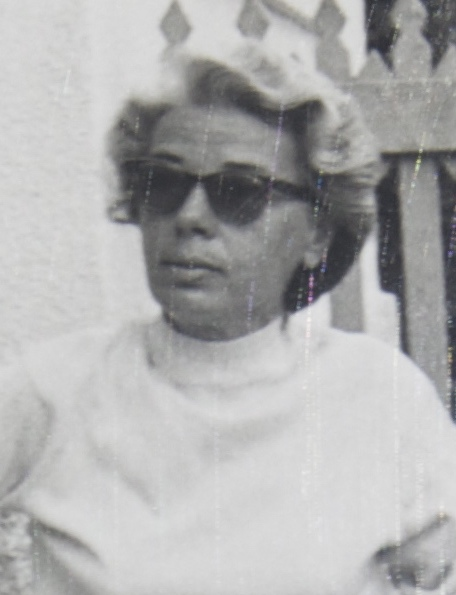
- Ester Carloni, late 1950s
- Born: Esterina Carloni c. 1904; Naples, Kingdom of Italy
- Died: 6 April 1996 (aged 91); Rome, Italy
- Occupation: Actress
- Years active: 1958–1992
- Relatives: Pietro Carloni (brother); Peppino De Filippo (brother-in-law); Titina De Filippo (sister-in-law)

Ester Carloni (born as Esterina Carloni) (c. 1904 – 6 April 1996) was an Italian actress. She appeared in more than forty films from 1958 to 1992.

Her siblings Pietro, Adelina (or Adele), Maria and Ettore were fellow actors. Her brother Pietro married actress Titina De Filippo and her sister Adelina married Titina's brother actor Peppino De Filippo. Titina and Peppino were siblings of well-known actor Eduardo De Filippo.

== Selected filmography ==
Year	Title	Role	Notes
1959	My Wife's Enemy		
1960	Totò, Fabrizi e i giovani d'oggi		
1961	The Fascist		
1962	I motorizzati		
1964	The Magnificent Cuckold		
1965	Made in Italy		
1969	The Damned		
1973	Flatfoot		
1973	Amore e ginnastica		
1975	Flatfoot in Hong Kong		
1975	Sex Pot		
1977	Three Tigers Against Three Tigers		
1977	Ecco noi per esempio		
1977	Anima persa		
1978	Traffic Jam		
1978	Flatfoot in Africa		
1980	Café Express		
1980	I Don't Understand You Anymore		
1980	Flatfoot in Egypt		
1981	Fantasma d'amore		
1982	Journey with Papa		
1991	The House of Smiles		
1992	Ciao, Professore!		
