= Rome-Paris-Rome =

1951 film

- Directed by: Luigi Zampa
- Written by: Vitaliano Brancati; Agenore Incrocci; Ruggero Maccari; Furio Scarpelli; Luigi Zampa
- Produced by: Domenico Forges Davanzati; Pierre Gurgo-Salice
- Starring: Aldo Fabrizi; Sophie Desmarets; Peppino De Filippo
- Cinematography: Carlo Montuori
- Edited by: Eraldo Da Roma
- Music by: Renzo Rossellini
- Production companies: Lux Compagnie Cinématographique de France; DFD
- Distributed by: Lux Film
- Release date: 18 October 1951
- Running time: 100 minutes
- Countries: France; Italy
- Language: Italian

Rome-Paris-Rome (Italian: Signori, in carrozza!) is a 1951 French-Italian comedy film directed by Luigi Zampa and starring Aldo Fabrizi, Sophie Desmarets and Peppino De Filippo. It was shot at the Farnesina Studios in Rome and on location in Paris. The film's sets were designed by the art director Enrico Ciampi.

== Plot ==
Vicenzo works as an attendant on the sleeping cars between Rome and Paris. For several years he has had two families, a wife and scrounging Neapolitan brother-in-law in Rome and an attractive widow with a young daughter in Paris whose existence he has managed to keep secret from the other. When he is offered the chance to work permanently at one location he chooses Paris, but complications ensue when his brother-in-law follows him to the French capital.

== Cast ==
- Aldo Fabrizi as Vincenzo Nardi
- Sophie Desmarets as Ginette
- Vera Nandi as Signora Nardi
- Peppino De Filippo as Gennaro
- Barbara Florian as Mirella
- Noël Roquevert as Robert
- Maso Lotti as Enrico Nardi
- Nando Bruno as Riccardo
- Geraldina Parrinello as Michélle
- Luigi Almirante as Professor Busi Migliavacca
- Anna Vita as Impiegata bionda alla Stazione Termini
- Marisa Merlini as signora nel vagone letto
- Pietro De Vico as Sposino nel vagone letto
- Julien Carette as Direttore parigino dei vagoni letto
- Checco Durante as Meccanico
- Ada Colangeli as Assunta, la portinaia
- Paolo Ferrara as direttore romano dei vagoni letto
- Janine Marsay as Praline
- Monica Clay as Liliana
- Laure Paillette as Paillette

== Criticism ==
Gian Piero Brunetta highlights for this period, the "progressive integration of writers in cinema", so in Signori, in carrozza! we find, Brancati among the screenwriters,Alberto Moravia had found in Perdizione, and, by listing, writers such as Palazzeschi, Calvino, Pratolini and others engaged in the new role of screenwriters. Brunetta himself sees this commitment, however, simply as a "recruitment of intellectual workforce for the manufacture of products destined for popular markets".

It has also been noted that Gentlemen, in a carriage! "Is considered a bit of a Cinderella among the films of Zampa and Brancati, overshadowed by better known works such as Difficult Years, Easy Years, The Art of Getting By.

Alberto Moravia said: "In this film there is only one really vital reason: the comparison between the scrounger and the scrounger, between the conductor of the sleeping cars and his impudent and insatiable brother-in-law".

== Bibliography ==
- Chiti, Roberto & Poppi, Roberto. Dizionario del cinema italiano: Dal 1945 al 1959. Gremese Editore, 1991.
