= Anna of Brooklyn =

1958 film

- Directed by: Vittorio De Sica; Carlo Lastricati
- Written by: Luciana Corda; Ettore Maria Margadonna; Dino Risi; Joseph Stefano
- Produced by: Milko Skofic; Marcello Girosi
- Starring: Gina Lollobrigida; Vittorio De Sica; Dale Robertson; Amedeo Nazzari; Peppino De Filippo
- Cinematography: Giuseppe Rotunno
- Edited by: Eraldo Da Roma
- Music by: Alessandro Cicognini; Vittorio De Sica
- Production companies: Cinematografica Latina; France Cinéma Productions; Les Films Marceau; Produzione Circeo
- Distributed by: Cinédis (France); Titanus (Italy)
- Release dates: 19 April 1958 (Italy); September 1960 (U.S.)
- Running time: 105 minutes
- Countries: France; Italy
- Language: Italian

Anna of Brooklyn (Italian: Anna di Brooklyn) is a 1958 French-Italian comedy film directed by Vittorio De Sica and Carlo Lastricati and starring Gina Lollobrigida, De Sica and Amedeo Nazzari.

It was shot at the Cinecittà Studios in Rome. The film's sets were designed by the art director Gastone Medin. It was distributed by Columbia Pictures in Britain and the United States and by Gloria Film in West Germany.

== Plot ==
A rich young widowed Gina Lollobrigida as Anna, leaves New York and searches for a husband in the village in Italy where she was born.

== Cast ==
- Gina Lollobrigida as Anna
- Vittorio De Sica as Don Luigi
- Dale Robertson as Raffaele
- Amedeo Nazzari as Ciccone
- Peppino De Filippo as Peppino
- Carla Macelloni as Rosina
- Gabriella Pallotta as Mariuccia
- Luigi De Filippo as Zitto-Zitto
- Clelia Matania as Camillina
- Renzo Cesana as Baron Trevassi
- Terence Hill as Chicco - Don Luigi's nephew
- Augusta Ciolli as Aunt Carmela
- Gigi Reder as Berardo
- Fausto Guerzoni Gentleman who buys the medicine
- Emma Baron
- Marga Cella
- Sandro Moretti
- Carlo Rizzo
- Molly Robinson
- Attilio Torelli
- Marco Tulli
- Ruth Volner
- Pasquale Misiano
- Alfredo Ricalzone
- Dori Romano

== Awards ==
Won

- 1958 David di Donatello Awards: David for Best Producer - Milko Skofic

Nominated

- 8th Berlin International Film Festival: Golden Bear

== Bibliography ==
- Chiti, Roberto & Poppi, Roberto. Dizionario del cinema italiano: Dal 1945 al 1959. Gremese Editore, 1991.
