= Italia Almirante Manzini =

Italian actress (1890–1941)

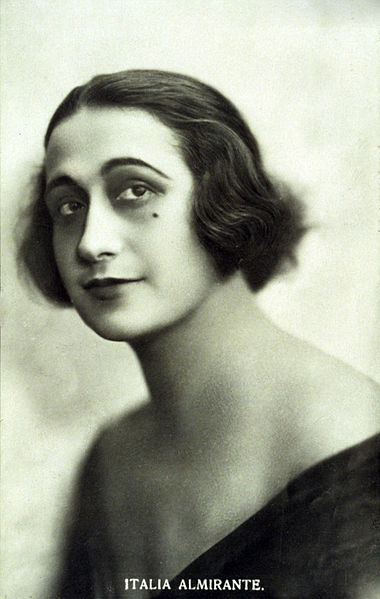
- Born: Italia Almirante; 3 June 1890; Taranto, Italy
- Died: 15 September 1941 (aged 51); São Paulo, Brazil
- Occupation: Actor
- Years active: 1911–1934

Italia Almirante Manzini (3 June 1890 – 15 September 1941) was an Italian actress of the silent film era. She appeared in more than fifty films from 1911 to 1934.

== Biography ==
She was born to Michele and actress Urania Dell'Este. Her paternal uncle was Nunzio Almirante, father of Mario (in turn father of politician Giorgio), Ernesto, Giacomo and Luigi. She married the journalist writer Amerigo Manzini when she was still young, and alongside him she acted on various occasions, both in theatre and film.

She moved to Brazil in 1935, where she died in 1941 due to an illness.

== Selected filmography ==
Year	Title	Role	Notes
1934	The Last of the Bergeracs	La Contessina	
1927	Beauty of the World		
1920	Hedda Gabler	Hedda Gabler	
1914	Cabiria	Sofonisba	
