= Luigi De Filippo =

Italian actor (1930–2018)

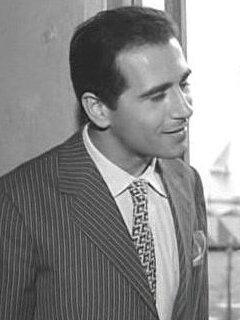
- De Filippo in Cerasella (1959)
- Born: 10 August 1930; Naples, Italy
- Died: 31 March 2018 (aged 87); Rome, Italy
- Occupations: Actor, playwright, theatre director
- Parent(s): Peppino De Filippo; Adele Carloni
- Website: luigidefilippo.it

Luigi De Filippo (10 August 1930 – 31 March 2018) was an Italian actor, stage director and playwright.

Born in Naples, the son of actors Peppino De Filippo and Adele Carloni, he studied literature at the university, leaving the studies on the threshold of graduation to pursue a career in journalism. Shorty later De Filippo debuted on stage next to his father, and from then he started a very long acting career, notably running for years a Neapolitan dialect company. He celebrated the fortieth anniversary of his stage activities with the reception of a special Premio Personalità Europea prize in Capitol Hill.

De Filippo appeared in many film roles, even if mainly in character roles. He was also active on television, mainly in television adaptations of his stage works. Since 2011 he has been the artistic director of the Parioli Theatre in Rome. De Filippo died in Rome on 31 March 2018 at the age of 87.

== Partial filmography ==
- Filumena Marturano (1951) - Umberto
- Non è vero... ma ci credo (1952) - Ragionier Pietro Spirito
- The Legend of the Piave (1952) - Giorgio, un soldato
- Peppino e la vecchia signora (1954)
- Cortile (1955) - Garage Attendant
- Da qui all'eredità (1955) - Pretendente di Marisa
- Lazzarella (1957) - Nicola Sant'Elmo
- Anna of Brooklyn (1958) - Zitto-Zitto
- Promesse di marinaio (1958) - Quattrocchi
- Policarpo (1959) - Gerolamo 'Gegè' Pancarano di Rondò
- You're on Your Own (1959) - Commilitone di Nicola
- Roulotte e roulette (1959) - Paolo
- Cerasella (1959) - Alfredo
- Il mio amico Jekyll (1960)
- Who Hesitates Is Lost (1960) - Cavallo
- Gli incensurati (1961)
- The Four Days of Naples (1962) - Cicillo (uncredited)
- Il mio amico Benito (1962) - Fioretti
- Honeymoon, Italian Style (1966) - Camilluccio
- Love Italian Style (1966) - Ricuzzo - Don Salvatore's Secretary
- Soldati e capelloni (1967) - Mosca
- Ninì Tirabusciò: la donna che inventò la mossa (1970) - Ciccio / Mohamed Ali
- Venga a fare il soldato da noi (1971) - Pasquale Gagliardelli
- Giovanni Senzapensieri (1986) - Achille / Segretario del Duca
- Quelli del casco (1988)
- In the Name of the Sovereign People (1990)
