= Gregorio Wu Pak Chiu =

Wu Pak Chiu (Chinese: 伍伯就 Pinyin: wǔ bó jiù; Yale Cantonese: ng5 ba3 jau6) (ca. 1913 – March 31, 1974), was a prominent Chinese tenor who sang in Europe under the name of Gregorio Wu Pak Chiu.

Wu Pak Chiu was born in Guangzhou, China, and graduated from the Shanghai Conservatory of Music in 1937 where he studied voice under Professor Lu Cha Zhi. During the Sino-Japanese War he earned fame for his singing of the anthem 'Defend China' by Ho An-Tung.

In December 1946, he left China and enrolled as a fourth year student at the Accademia di Santa Cecilia in Rome. He graduated in 1948 at the top of his class. During that period he also studied as a private student with Beniamino Gigli. In 1952 he sang in concert with Gigli and his daughter Rina Gigli at Sezze Romano. Gigli also attended Wu Pak Chiu's solo concert in Rome at the Sala Borromini on June 29, 1955.

Following his performance as the tenor soloist in Bartók's Cantata Profana at the Teatro Argentina in Rome in 1954, he was invited to sing in Italy, Spain, France, Germany, Portugal, Switzerland, and England both in concert halls and on radio and television, where he often included Chinese songs in his repertoire. He also played Chinese characters in several Italian movies.

In 1969, he returned to Hong Kong where he gave his final performance in a recital for the Lingnan University Alumni Association. Following his retirement from the concert stage, he taught vocal and choral singing at several secondary schools in the city and directed a production of Giacomo Puccini's Turandot. He died in Hong Kong.
