= A Day in Court =

1953 film

- Film poster
- Directed by: Steno
- Written by: Sandro Continenza; Lucio Fulci; Steno
- Produced by: Gianni Hecht Lucari; Dino De Laurentiis; Carlo Ponti
- Starring: Peppino De Filippo; Silvana Pampanini; Alberto Sordi; Sophia Loren
- Cinematography: Marco Scarpelli
- Edited by: Giuliana Attenni
- Music by: Armando Trovajoli
- Production companies: Documento Film; Excelsa Film
- Distributed by: Minerva Film
- Release date: 28 January 1954
- Running time: 101 minutes
- Country: Italy
- Language: Italian

A Day in Court (Italian: Un giorno in pretura) is a 1954 Italian comedy film directed by Steno and starring Peppino De Filippo, Silvana Pampanini, Sophia Loren, and Alberto Sordi. The film is an anthology, consisting of a day's cases before Judge Salomone Lo Russo in a court in Rome.

== Plot ==
The cat thief. A poor old man, accused of stealing and eating a cat, is found guilty.

Leopoldo and Teresa. An engaged couple are accused of compromising behaviour in a parked car. She falls for their handsome young advocate and goes off with him instead.

Paolo and Elena. She accuses him of abandoning the marital home, leaving her penniless. He proves her adultery, first by a tape recording and secondly by film from a hidden camera.

Don Michele and Anna. Don Michele, a keen young Catholic priest is accused of starting a brawl in a pool hall. He pleads guilty, but proceedings are interrupted by Anna, a beautiful young prostitute. She explains that in a bus she lifted his wallet, which was then seized by her pimp, who went off to play pool. The priest followed and the fight ensued, for which he gets three months.

Nando. Accused of immodesty by going around naked, Nando explains that on a hot day he took a dip in a stream and found his clothes gone. Entering an apparently empty house to find something to cover himself, he surprised a nearly-blind old lady. When she found her glasses, her screams brought others and Nando was arrested. A policeman explains that he had taken the man's clothes to the station, but forgot all about them when told that his wife had just had a baby. Given three months, an enraged Nando vows revenge.

Gloriana. A sad old woman accused of drunkenness and harassing people, says she was a much-loved variety artiste during the First World War. The judge remembers her giving a sexy show behind the front when he was a young lieutenant. Due to a mix-up she had nowhere to stay for the night, so he was ordered to give her his room. When he took out his things and returned to the officers' mess, he was ordered for the honour of the army to go back and claim her. In fact, he passed a freezing night on her balcony. After dismissing the case, he retires to his chambers and explains to a bust of the celebrated Roman lawyer Marcus Tullius Cicero that, despite basing his career on strict application of the criminal law, sometimes one has to temper justice with mercy.

Lazio vs Roma. At a football match three months later, Lo Russo is cheering his son who plays for Lazio. Nearby, Nando is cheering for Roma. A brawl starts and both men are arrested.

== Cast ==
- Peppino De Filippo as Judge Lo Russo
- Silvana Pampanini as Gloriana
- Alberto Sordi as Nando
- Sophia Loren as Anna
- Tania Weber as Elena
- Leopoldo Trieste as Leopoldo
- Walter Chiari as Don Michele
- Armenia Balducci as Teresa
- Virgilio Riento as Virgilio Pampinelli
- Giulio Calì as Augusto Mencacci
- Turi Pandolfini as clerk of the court
- Vincenzo Talarico as defence lawyer
- Ubaldo Lay as Anna's pimp
- Amalia Pellegrini as rich old lady

== Production ==
Lucio Fulci and Paolo Heusch were assistant directors. It was shown as part of a retrospective on Italian comedy at the 67th Venice International Film Festival. It took in around 473 million lire at the Italian box office. A young Lucio Fulci originated the idea and format for this film, and then helped to write the screenplay and assist Steno in directing it, making it the largest screen credit in his career up to this point. Critics said the film was carried by the versatile acting of Peppino De Filippo, who was convinced to become a comedian by the Italian actor Totò. Alberto Sordi's character of Nando Moriconi became so popular, he reprised the role in several later Italian comedies, such as An American in Rome (1954), without ever sharing the credit with Fulci. Fulci always took credit for creating the Nando Moriconi character, although Alberto Sordi said it was his portrayal of the character that made it so popular. Fulci said that in post production, producer Carlo Ponti almost cut the segment out for time constraints, but Ponti's wife Silvana Mangano made him leave it in. The film made a fortune as a result, according to Fulci, and helped launch Sordi's comedy career.

== Bibliography ==
- Chiti, Roberto; Poppi, Roberto (1991). Dizionario del cinema italiano: Dal 1945 al 1959. Gremese Editore.
- Howarth, Troy (2015). Splintered Visions: Lucio Fulci and his Films. Midnight Marquee Press. ISBN 978-1-936168-53-8.
