= Titina De Filippo =

Italian actress and playwright

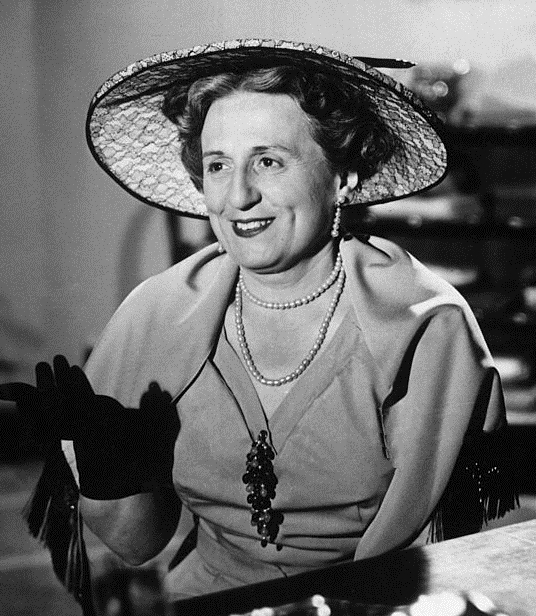
- Titina De Filippo in the 1950s
- Born: Annunziata De Filippo; 27 March 1898; Naples, Kingdom of Italy
- Died: 26 December 1963 (aged 65); Rome, Italy
- Occupations: Actress; playwright
- Spouse: Pietro Carloni
- Children: Augusto Carloni
- Parents: Eduardo Scarpetta (father); Luisa De Filippo (mother)
- Relatives: Peppino De Filippo (brother); Eduardo De Filippo (brother); Eduardo Passarelli (half-brother); Ester Carloni (sister-in-law); Luca De Filippo (nephew); Luigi De Filippo (nephew)

Annunziata "Titina" De Filippo (27 March 1898 – 26 December 1963) was an Italian actress and playwright.

== Life ==
De Filippo was born in via Dell'Ascensione in Chiaia, Naples, the oldest of three children born from the extramarital relationship between Luisa De Filippo and Eduardo Scarpetta, a well-respected playwright in Naples. Her father was actually married since 1876 to Rosa De Filippo, Luisa's paternal aunt; he also had several other illegitimate children from various affairs (including actors Ernesto Murolo, Eduardo Passarelli, and Pasquale De Filippo).

Titina and her two brothers, actor Peppino De Filippo and playwright and director Eduardo De Filippo, became known as "Children of the buttons", since their mother was a seamstress to Eduardo's company. She was married to actor Pietro Carloni and they had one son, Augusto Carloni. The actress Ester Carloni was her husband's sister. Her brother Peppino was married to Adelina (or Adele) Carloni, another of her husband's siblings.

Titina De Filippo studied music and learned French as a child. She made her stage debut at the age of seven.

== Filmography ==
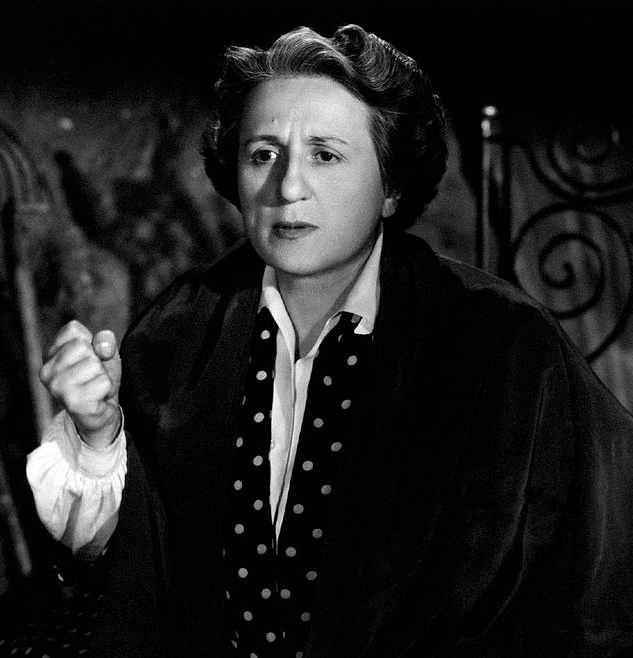
De Filippo in Cani e gatti (1952)

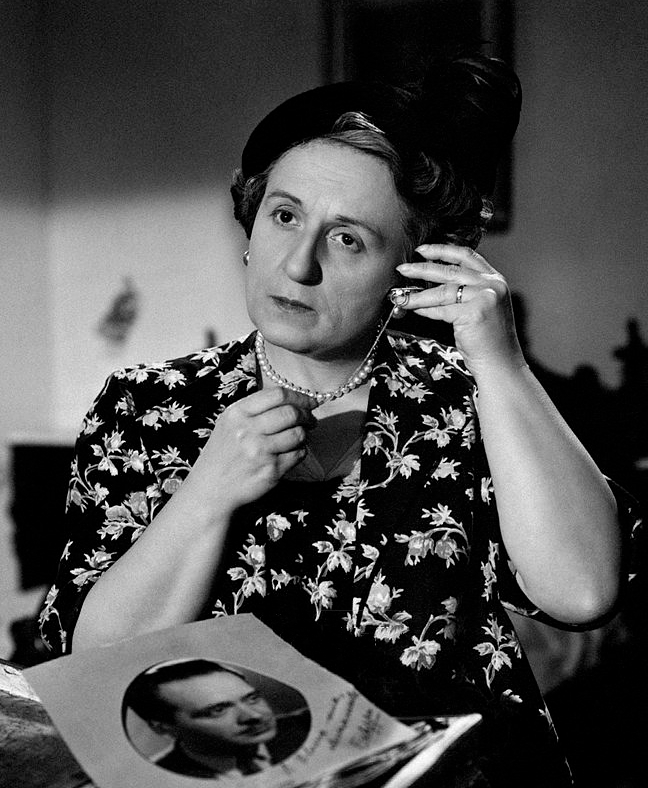
De Filippo in Cani e gatti (1952)

Titina De Filippo with her brother Eduardo in 100 Years of Love (1954)

- It Was I! (1937)
- Ma l'amor mio non muore (1938)
- Frenzy (1939)
- Assenza ingiustificata (1939)
- Saint John, the Beheaded (1940)
- Villa da vendere (1941)
- Once a Week (1942)
- Non ti pago! (1942)
- Ti conosco, mascherina! (1943)
- Uno tra la folla (1946)
- Assunta Spina (1948)
- Napoli milionaria (1950)
- Cameriera bella presenza offresi (1951)
- Filumena Marturano (1951)
- Cinque poveri in automobile (1952)
- Cats and Dogs (1952)
- Husband and Wife (1952)
- I morti non pagano le tasse (1952)
- Non è vero, ma ci credo (1952)
- Ragazze da marito (1952)
- Il tallone d'Achille (1952)
- Cento anni d'amore ('One hundred years of love') (1953)
- Il fuoco nelle vene (1953)
- Martin Toccaferro (1953)
- La fortuna di essere donna (1955)
- I pappagalli (1955)
- Totò, Peppino e i fuorilegge (1956)
- Non cantare, baciami (1956)
- I vagabondi delle stelle (1956)
- La canzone del destino (1957)
- Totò, Vittorio e la dottoressa (1957)
- Ferdinando I, re di Napoli (1959)
