= Wanda Osiris =

Italian actress and singer (1905–1994)

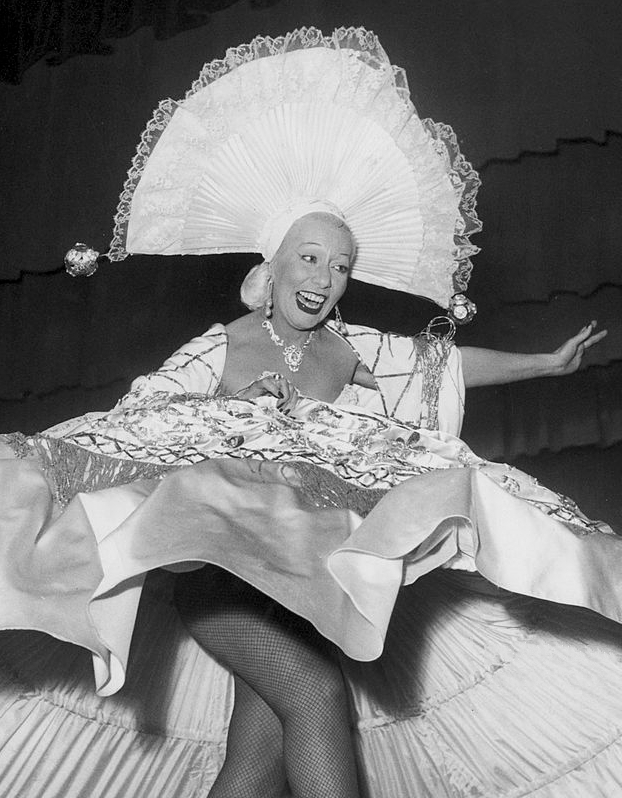
- Wanda Osiris in 1952
- Born: Anna Maria Menzio; 3 June 1905; Rome, Kingdom of Italy
- Died: 11 November 1994 (aged 89); Milan, Italy
- Occupations: Revue actress; singer

Anna Maria Menzio (3 June 1905 – 11 November 1994), known professionally as Wanda Osiris (pronounced [ˈvanda oˈziːris]; Italianized as Vanda Osiri during the Fascist era), was an Italian revue actress and singer.

== Life and career ==
Born in Rome, Italy, the daughter of a groom, she studied violin at a young age. She debuted on stage in 1923, in the revue Osvaldo mio mi fai morire. She was the major diva of the Italian revue between 1930s and 1950s, until a new type of soubrette, more saucy and comical, surfaced. She retired in 1975, and died of a heart attack in 1994, at the age of 89.

== Filmography ==
Year	Title	Role	Notes
1940	Non me lo dire!	Priscilla	
1943	Arcobaleno		
1949	The Firemen of Viggiù	Herself	
1950	I'm in the Revue	Dancer	
1953	Martin Toccaferro	Signora Baroni	
1955	Carousel of Variety		
1962	Nerone '71	Concetta Pagliarozzi / Ninì Bluette	
1973	Polvere di stelle	Vanda Osiris	
