= Side Street Story =

1950 Italian comedy film

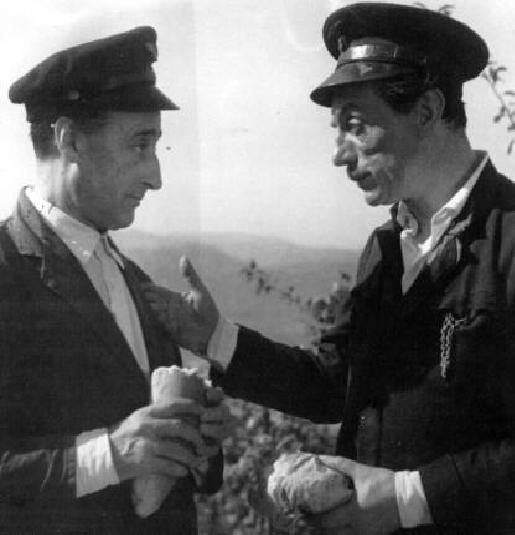
- Totò and Eduardo De Filippo
- Napoli milionaria (Italian)
- Directed by: Eduardo De Filippo
- Written by: Eduardo De Filippo; Arduino Maiuri; Piero Tellini
- Produced by: Eduardo De Filippo; Dino De Laurentiis
- Starring: Eduardo De Filippo; Totò
- Cinematography: Aldo Tonti
- Edited by: Giuliana Attenni; Douglas Robertson
- Music by: Nino Rota
- Production company: Lux Film
- Release date: 1950
- Running time: 102 minutes
- Country: Italy
- Languages: Italian, Neapolitan

Side Street Story (Italian: Napoli milionaria [ˈnaːpoli miljoˈnaːrja], meaning "Millionaire Naples") is a 1950 Italian comedy film directed by Eduardo De Filippo, who wrote the play upon which the film is based. It was entered into the 1951 Cannes Film Festival.

== Plot ==
Naples, 1942. People are in crisis due to the Second World War. Gennaro has a café and hopes that the family will help him with the work so that it can settle down. His wife is engaged in the Black Market to help keep them going, and one thing leads to another. His son Amedeo, however, envisions revolutions and the redemption of the poor. Peppe is killed in a tragic accident while being arrested during street violence, an event which is not seen in the play. Gennaro's family mysteriously enters into a crisis and, among various other adventures and sad situations, Pasquale, a family member believed to be dead, comes onto the scene.

Though not in the original stage piece, the part of Pasquale was written specifically for the actor Totò.

== Cast ==
- Eduardo De Filippo – Gennaro Iovine
- Leda Gloria – Amalia, la moglie di Gennaro
- Delia Scala – Maria Rosaria Iovine, la figlia di Gennaro
- Gianni Musy – Amedeo Iovine figlio di Gennaro (as Gianni Glori)
- Totò – Pasquale Miele
- Titina De Filippo – Adelaide
- Carlo Ninchi – Il brigadiere di Ps
- Dante Maggio – Il rosticciere
- Laura Gore – La moglie del ragionier Spasiani
- Mario Soldati – Il ragioner Spasiani
- Aldo Giuffrè – Federico
- Carlo Mazzoni – Il sergente americano
- Michael Tor – L'ufficiale americano
- Aldo Tonti
- Pietro Carloni – Un soldato americano
- Mario Frera – Peppe "'o Cricco"
- Pietro Pennetti – Un soldato
- Giacomo Rondinella – Il cantante di concertino
- Rosita Pisano – Assunta
- Concetta Palumbo – Riruccia
- Mariano Englen
- Carlo Giuffrè – Ernesto
- Nino Vingelli – Giovanni
