= List of Italian films of 1932 =

A list of films produced in Italy in 1932 (see 1932 in film):

Title	Director	Cast	Genre	Notes
1932
The Blue Fleet	Gennaro Righelli	Germana Paolieri, Ennio Cerlesi	Adventure	
Five to Nil	Mario Bonnard	Angelo Musco, Osvaldo Valenti	Sports comedy	
The Gift of the Morning	Enrico Guazzoni	Germana Paolieri, Carlo Lombardi	Comedy	
The Last Adventure	Mario Camerini	Armando Falconi, Diomira Jacobini	Comedy	
The Old Lady	Amleto Palermi	Vittorio De Sica, Nella Maria Bonora	Comedy	De Sica's first sound film
One Night with You	Ferruccio Biancini, E.W. Emo	Elsa Merlini, Nino Besozzi	Comedy	
The Opera Singer	Nunzio Malasomma	Gianfranco Giachetti, Germana Paolieri	Musical	
Palio	Alessandro Blasetti	Leda Gloria, Laura Nucci	Historical	
Paradise	Guido Brignone	Nino Besozzi, Sandra Ravel	Comedy	
Pergolesi	Guido Brignone	Elio Steiner, Dria Paola	Historical musical	
The Table of the Poor	Alessandro Blasetti	Raffaele Viviani, Leda Gloria	Comedy	
The Telephone Operator	Nunzio Malasomma	Isa Pola, Mimì Aylmer	Comedy	
Two Happy Hearts	Baldassarre Negroni	Vittorio De Sica, Rina Franchetti	Comedy	
Venus	Nicola Fausto Neroni	Maurizio D'Ancora, Evelina Paoli	Drama	
La Wally	Guido Brignone	Germana Paolieri, Isa Pola	Musical	
What Scoundrels Men Are!	Mario Camerini	Vittorio De Sica, Lia Franca, Cesare Zoppetti	Comedy	Great success
Your Money or Your Life	Carlo Ludovico Bragaglia	Sergio Tofano, Rosetta Tofano	Comedy	
Zaganella and the Cavalier	Giorgio Mannini, Gustavo Serena	Arturo Falconi, Marcella Albani	Comedy	

== See also ==
- List of Italian films of 1931
- List of Italian films of 1933
