= List of Italian films of 1931 =

A list of films produced in Italy in 1931 (see 1931 in film):

Title	Director	Cast	Genre	Notes
1931
Antonio di Padova, Il santo dei miracoli	Giulio Antamoro	Carlo Pinzauti, Elio Cosci	Biopic	
Before the Jury	Guido Brignone	Marcella Albani, Lia Franca	Crime	
The Charmer	Guido Brignone	Armando Falconi, Tina Lattanzi	Comedy	
Courtyard	Carlo Campogalliani	Ettore Petronilini, Dria Paola	Drama	
The Devil's Lantern	Carlo Campogalliani	Nella Maria Bonora, Carlo Gualandri	Drama	
The Doctor in Spite of Himself	Carlo Campogalliani	Ettore Petrolini, Letizia Quaranta	Comedy	
Figaro and His Great Day	Mario Camerini	Gianfranco Giachetti, Leda Gloria	Comedy	
Lowered Sails	Anton Giulio Bragaglia	Dria Paola, Umberto Sacripante	Drama	
The Man with the Claw	Nunzio Malasomma	Dria Paola, Elio Steiner	Mystery	
Mother Earth	Alessandro Blasetti	Leda Gloria, Sandro Salvini	Drama	
The Private Secretary	Goffredo Alessandrini	Elsa Merlini, Nino Besozzi	Comedy	
Resurrection	Alessandro Blasetti	Lia Franca, Daniele Crespi	Drama	

== See also ==
- List of Italian films of 1930
- List of Italian films of 1932
