= List of Italian films of 1930 =

A list of films produced in Italy in 1930 (see 1930 in film):

Title	Director	Cast	Genre	Notes
1930
Assunta Spina	Roberto Roberti	Rina De Liguoro, Febo Mari	Drama	
La Leggenda di Wally	Gian Orlando Vassallo	Piero Pastore, Linda Pini		
Nerone	Alessandro Blasetti	Ettore Petrolini, Elma Krimer, Alfredo Martinelli	Sword and sandal	
The Song of Love	Gennaro Righelli	Dria Paola, Isa Pola, Mercedes Brignone, Elio Steiner, Camillo Pilotto, Olga Capri		1st Italian talkie movie. It was filmed in German and French by other directors. Based on a Luigi Pirandello's work
When Naples Sings	Mario Almirante	Malcolm Tod, Felice Minotti	Musical	

== See also ==
- List of Italian films of 1929
- List of Italian films of 1931
