= Ragazzo =

1934 Italian lost film

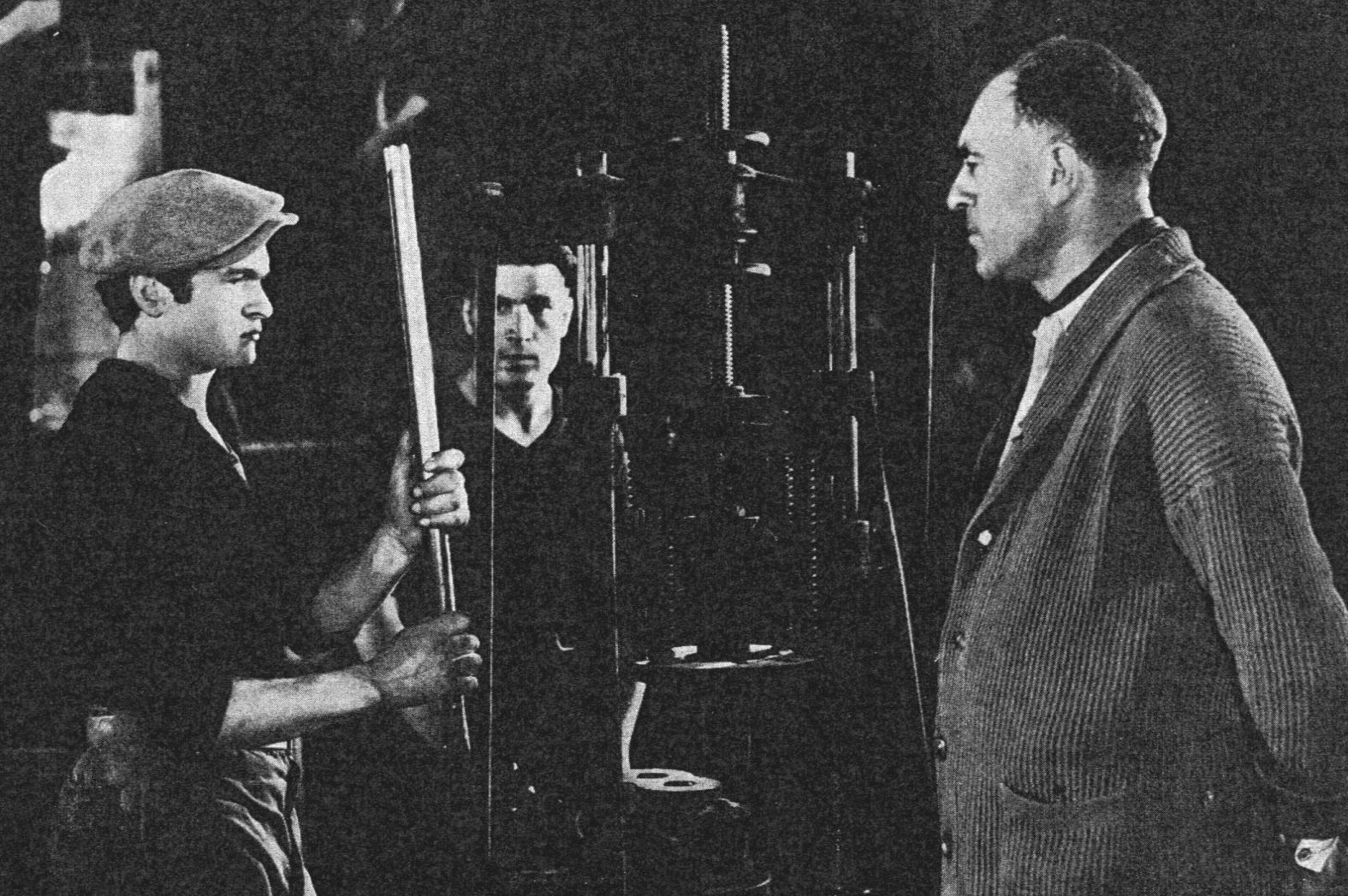
- A scene of the film.
- Directed by: Ivo Perilli
- Screenplay by: Ivo Perilli; Emilio Cecchi
- Story by: Nino D'Aroma; Sandro De Feo
- Starring: Costantino Frasca; Isa Pola; Giovanna Scotto; Osvaldo Valenti; Anna Vinci; Marcello Martire; Aristide Garbini; Arnaldo Baldaccini
- Cinematography: Domenico Scala; Massimo Terzano
- Music by: Luigi Colacicchi
- Production company: Cines-Pittaluga
- Distributed by: Società Anonima Stefano Pittaluga
- Release date: 1934
- Country: Italy
- Language: Italian

Ragazzo (Italian for Boy) is a 1934 Italian lost film directed by Ivo Perilli. The film was censored by the Italian government, and its only known copy was subsequently looted by German soldiers in 1944 and has not resurfaced.

== Plot ==
The film follows Giovanni, a working-class orphan living in Rome, who realizes that his criminal lifestyle is wrong and becomes a devout fascist.

== Cast ==
The following is the cast of Ragazzo:

- Costantino Frasca as Giovanni
- Isa Pola as Principessita
- Giovanna Scotto as La madre del ragazzo
- Osvaldo Valenti as Malvivente di borgata
- Anna Vinci as Antonietta
- Marcello Martire as Dirigente fascista
- Aristide Garbini as Pugile
- Arnaldo Baldaccini as Proprietario della fabbrica

== Production ==
The film was directed by Ivo Perilli and the screenplay was done by Perilli and Emilio Cecchi. The story was written by Nino D'Aroma and Sandro De Feo, the music was composed by Luigi Colacicchi, and the cinematography was done by Domenico Scala and Massimo Terzano. Filming by Cines-Pittaluga occurred in the "poorer sections" of Rome and the intended distributor was Società Anonima Stefano Pittaluga (SASP).

== Censorship and destruction ==
Ragazzo was the only completed Italian film, out of approximately 700, not to be released due to government censorship between 1930 and 1944. The Italian censorship commission, as well as Benito Mussolini himself, objected to the film's portrayal of the poorer sections of Rome, which the government had claimed no longer existed, and that a "model fascist" could arise from a "criminal gang of hooligans". As such, the film was never released nor screened in any Italian theater.
