= The Carnival of Venice (1928 film) =

1928 film

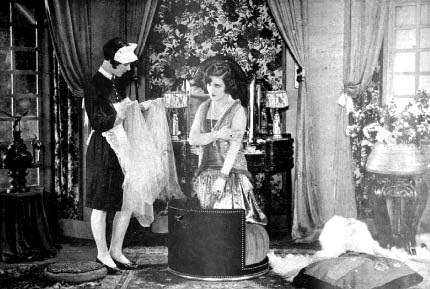
- Directed by: Mario Almirante
- Written by: Michel Linsky; Pier Angelo Mazzolotti
- Starring: Maria Jacobini; Malcolm Tod; Bonaventura Ibáñez
- Cinematography: Ubaldo Arata; Massimo Terzano
- Production company: Società Anonima Stefano Pittaluga
- Distributed by: Società Anonima Stefano Pittaluga
- Release date: 2 January 1928
- Running time: 110 minutes
- Country: Italy
- Languages: Silent; Italian intertitles

The Carnival of Venice (Italian: Il carnevale di Venezia) is a 1928 Italian silent drama film directed by Mario Almirante and starring Maria Jacobini, Malcolm Tod and Bonaventura Ibáñez. The film's sets were designed by the art director Giulio Lombardozzi.

== Cast ==
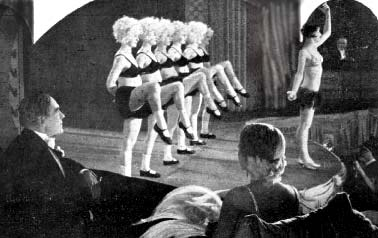

- Maria Jacobini as Graziella Morosin
- Malcolm Tod as Edwald Jefferson
- Bonaventura Ibáñez as Duca Morosin
- Alex Bernard as Whisky, il segretario
- Josyane as Germaine Normand
- Manlio Mannozzi as Giorgio
- Andrea Miano
- Felice Minotti
- Carlo Tedeschi
- Giuseppe Brignone

== Bibliography ==
- Dalle Vacche, Angela. Diva: Defiance and Passion in Early Italian Cinema. University of Texas Press, 2008.
- Reich, Jacqueline & Garofalo, Piero. Re-viewing Fascism: Italian Cinema, 1922-1943. Indiana University Press, 2002.
