= Stadium (film) =

1934 Italian film directed by Carlo Campogalliani

- Directed by: Carlo Campogalliani
- Written by: Romolo Marcellini; Gino Nervi
- Produced by: Federico Curioni; Gennaro Righelli
- Cinematography: Carlo Montuori; Massimo Terzano
- Edited by: Mario Costa
- Music by: Giulio Bonnard
- Production companies: Ardita Film; Istituto Luce
- Release date: 1934
- Running time: 62 minutes
- Country: Italy
- Language: Italian

Stadium (Italian: Stadio) is a 1934 Italian sports film directed by Carlo Campogalliani and starring Emma Guerra, Maria Arcione, and Giorgio Censi.

It was shot at the Cines Studios in Rome. The film's sets were designed by Gastone Medin.

== Cast ==
- Emma Guerra as Renata
- Maria Arcione as Phily
- Giorgio Censi as Gianni
- Enrico Amante as Ugo
- Enzo Rampelli as Fulvio
- Giancarlo Del Vecchio as Gino
- Luigi Beccali as Se stesso
- Gianfranco Bondi
- Andrea Checchi
- Enzo Pietropaoli
- Piero Vinci

== Bibliography ==
- Mancini, Elaine. Struggles of the Italian film industry during fascism, 1930-1935. UMI Research Press, 1985.
