= Condottieri (film) =

1937 film

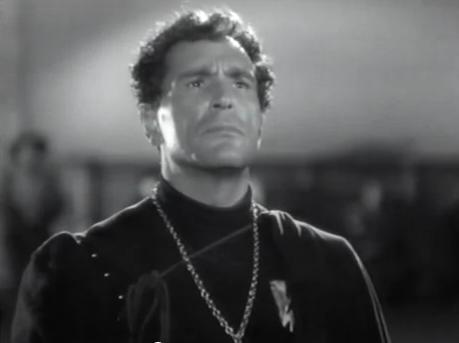
- Luis Trenker, as Giovanni de' Medici
- Directed by: Luis Trenker
- Written by: Kurt Heuser; Mirko Jelusich; Luis Trenker
- Starring: Luis Trenker; Loris Gizzi; Laura Nucci; Carla Sveva
- Cinematography: Walter Hege; Carlo Montuori; Klaus von Rautenfeld
- Edited by: Giorgio Simonelli
- Music by: Giuseppe Becce
- Production company: ENIC
- Distributed by: ENIC
- Release date: 1937
- Running time: 88 minutes
- Country: Italy
- Language: Italian

Condottieri is a 1937 Italian historical drama film directed by Luis Trenker and starring Trenker, Loris Gizzi and Laura Nucci. It portrays the life of Giovanni de' Medici, a celebrated condottiere of the sixteenth century. A separate German-language version was also made.

The film received 9.6 million lire of funding from the Italian government, as part of a major drive by the Fascist authorities to develop the Italian film industry (which also involved the construction of the large Cinecittà complex in Rome). Along with Scipio Africanus, the film was an attempt to harness history to support the Fascist regime's current policies. Condottieri drew parallels between the dictator Benito Mussolini and the historical figure of de' Medici, portraying both as unifying Italy. The film's elaborate sets were designed by Virgilio Marchi and Erich Grave, while Herbert Ploberger produced the costumes.

== Cast ==
- Luis Trenker as Giovanni de' Medici
- Loris Gizzi as Malatesta
- Laura Nucci as Tullia delle Grazie
- Carla Sveva as Maria Salviati
- Ethel Maggi as Caterina Sforza
- Mario Ferrari as Cesare Borgia
- Angelo Ferrari
- Giulio Cirino as Rüschli
- Sandro Dani as D'Argentière
- Tito Gobbi as Nino
- Augusto Marcacci as Daniello
- Nino Marchetti as Corrado
- Lando Muzio as Pedro
- Ernesto Nannicini
- Umberto Sacripante as Sanzio
- Carlo Tamberlani as Duke of Urbino
- Gino Viotti as Pope
- Giuseppe Addobbati as Duke of Imola
- Friedl Trenker as Giovanni
- Oreste Bilancia
- Alberto Emmerich
- Carlo Fontana
- Tullio Galvani
- Luis Gerold as Barbo
- Alberto Minoprio
- Carlo Simoneschi
- Virgilio Botti
- Mara Danieli
- Claudio Ermelli
- Carlo Duse

== Production ==
Luis Trenker directed and starred in the leading role.

Filming was done on location in Florence in 1936.

== Works cited ==
- Hull, David (1969). Film in the Third Reich: Art and Propaganda in Nazi Germany. Simon & Schuster. SBN 671214861.
