= Battles in the Shadow =

1938 film directed by Domenico Gambino

- Directed by: Domenico Gambino
- Written by: Sergio Amidei; Domenico Gambino
- Produced by: Tullo Taormina
- Starring: Antonio Centa; Dria Paola; Paola Barbara
- Cinematography: Tamás Keményffy
- Edited by: Giorgio Simonelli
- Music by: Ulisse Siciliani
- Production company: Diana Film
- Distributed by: Generalcine
- Release date: 23 November 1938
- Running time: 88 minutes
- Country: Italy
- Language: Italian

Battles in the Shadow (Italian: Lotte nell'ombra) is a 1938 Italian spy thriller film directed by Domenico Gambino and starring Antonio Centa, Dria Paola and Paola Barbara. It was shot at the Cinecittà Studios in Rome. The film's sets were designed by the art director Giorgio Pinzauti.

== Synopsis ==
A group of foreign agents steal a formula for a new explosive, then kidnap the scientist's secretary to try and force her to decode the blueprints.

== Cast ==
- Antonio Centa as Mario
- Dria Paola as Susanna
- Paola Barbara as Olga
- Renato Cialente as Korsanoff
- Febo Mari as Landi
- Silvana Jachino as Dora
- Renzo Merusi as Vittorio
- Carlo Lombardi as Ram-Sci
- Carlo Duse as Blanchard
- Roberto Bianchi Montero as Bob

== Bibliography ==
- Chiti, Roberto & Poppi, Roberto. I film: Tutti i film italiani dal 1930 al 1944. Gremese Editore, 2005.
- Curti, Roberto. Italian Giallo in Film and Television: A Critical History. McFarland, 2022.
