= Gianpaolo Rosmino =

Italian actor and film director (1888–1982)

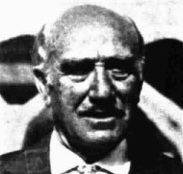
- Born: 2 July 1888; Turin, Piedmont; Italy
- Died: 20 July 1982 (aged 94); Rapallo, Liguria; Italy
- Other name: Gian Paolo Rosmino
- Occupations: Actor; Director
- Years active: 1913–65 (film)

Gianpaolo Rosmino (2 July 1888 – 20 July 1982) was an Italian actor and film director. Rosmino enjoyed a lengthy screen career. After making his debut in the silent era in 1913 he appeared in more than 80 films and television series up to 1965. He played a prominent role in the 1913 silent Love Everlasting, one of the two most famous Italian early silent films. He is sometimes credited as Gian Paolo Rosmino.

He played the title role in the 1935 film Don Bosco.

== Selected filmography ==
=== Actor ===
- Love Everlasting (1914) - Moise Sthar
- Nerone e Agrippina (1914) - Britannico
- Mai più! (1914)
- Iwna, la perla del Gange (1914)
- Cofanetto dei milioni (1914)
- Guerra in tempo di pace (1914)
- Lo scrigno dei milioni (1914)
- Pagine sparse (1914)
- Tenebre... (1914)
- Il gioco dell'amore (1915)
- La pantomima della morte (1915) - Marchese Gualtiero Servent
- Le memorie del diavolo (1915)
- Sul campo dell'onore (1915)
- La strega (1915)
- Sul limite del Nirvana (1915)
- Passano gli Unni... (1916)
- Como aquel día (1916)
- Flor de otoño (1916)
- La vida y la muerte (1916)
- La vita e la morte (1917)
- Ironie della vita (1917) - Paolo Rosmino
- Leda senza cigno (1918)
- La riscossa delle maschere (1919)
- Per la sua bocca (1919)
- Le due rose (1919)
- Te lo dirò domani (1919)
- La dame en gris (1919)
- La signora innamorata (1920)
- Fugge la gloria (1920)
- La telefonata del diavolo (1920)
- Mia moglie si è fidanzata (1921) - James
- Il club degli stravaganti (1921) - Il presidente del club
- La pianista di Haynes (1921) - Paolo Andressy
- Te chiamme Maria (1921)
- La trappola (1922) - Claudio Mari
- Un cuore, un pugnale, un cervello (1922)
- Il miraggio di mezzanotte (1922)
- Nterra 'e Surriento (1928)
- Aldebaran (1935) - Luigi Bandi
- Don Bosco (1935) - Don Giovanni Bosco
- The Dance of Time (1936)
- Bertoldo, Bertoldino e Cacasenno (1937) - Il re
- Marcella (1937)
- Guest for One Night (1939) - L'ispettore Lasalle
- Song to the Wind (1939) - Il segretario di Tanzi
- L'amore si fa così (1939) - Massimo Dalton
- L'attore scomparso (1941)
- Il fanciullo del West (1942) - Lo stregone
- Rita of Cascia (1943) - Frate Remigio
- Sant'Elena, piccola isola (1943) - Il colonnello Malcolm
- Caccia all'uomo (1948) - (uncredited)
- The Flame That Will Not Die (1949)
- The Young Caruso (1951) - Goffredo
- The Wonderful Adventures of Guerrin Meschino (1952) - Astrologist
- Immortal Melodies (1952) - Guido Menasci
- The Return of Don Camillo (1953) - (uncredited)
- The Pagans (1953) - Priest
- Frine, Courtesan of Orient (1953) - Traulete
- Verdi, the King of Melody (1953) - (uncredited)
- Mata Hari's Daughter (1954) - Colonello Stretten
- Un giglio infranto (1955) - Giuseppe Renzi
- Un po' di cielo (1955) - Colonnello Serafini
- Roland the Mighty (1956)
- Il prezzo della gloria (1956) - Ammiraglio
- Hercules (1958) - Aesculapius
- Afrodite, dea dell'amore (1958) - Dineo
- First Love (1959) - Padre di Francesca
- The Giant of Marathon (1959)
- Hercules Unchained (1959)
- The Thief of Baghdad (1961) - Chamberlain (english version)
- The Golden Arrow (1962) - Mokbar
- Fury of Achilles (1962) - Calcante
- La vendetta di Spartacus (1964) - Senatore

== Bibliography ==
- Moliterno, Gino. Historical Dictionary of Italian Cinema. Scarecrow Press, 2008.
