= Lowered Sails =

1931 film

- Directed by: Anton Giulio Bragaglia
- Written by: Anton Giulio Bragaglia; Aldo Vergano
- Starring: Dria Paola; Carlo Fontana (actor)|Carlo Fontana; Umberto Guarracino
- Cinematography: Domenico Scala; Massimo Terzano
- Edited by: Carlo Ludovico Bragaglia
- Music by: Ezio Carabella
- Production company: Società Italiana Cines
- Distributed by: Cinès-Pittaluga
- Release date: 1931
- Running time: 62 minutes
- Country: Italy
- Language: Italian

Lowered Sails (Italian: Vele ammainate) is a 1931 Italian drama film directed by Anton Giulio Bragaglia and starring Dria Paola, Carlo Fontana and Umberto Guarracino.

The film's sets were designed by the art directors, Gastone Medin and Ivo Perilli. It was shot at the Cines Studios in Rome.

== Cast ==
- Dria Paola as Aurora - la ragazza della taverna
- Carlo Fontana as Il capitano di marina
- Umberto Guarracino as Il padrone della taverna
- Enrica Fantis
- Umberto Sacripante
- Tullio Galvani
- Umberto Cocchi
- Amerigo Bomprezzi
- Renato Chiantoni
- Renato Malavasi
- Otty Noceti
- Giuseppe Pierozzi
- Riccardo Rivaroli
- Idolo Tancredi

== Bibliography ==
- Moliterno, Gino. The A to Z of Italian Cinema. Scarecrow Press, 2009.
