= Pergolesi (film) =

1932 film

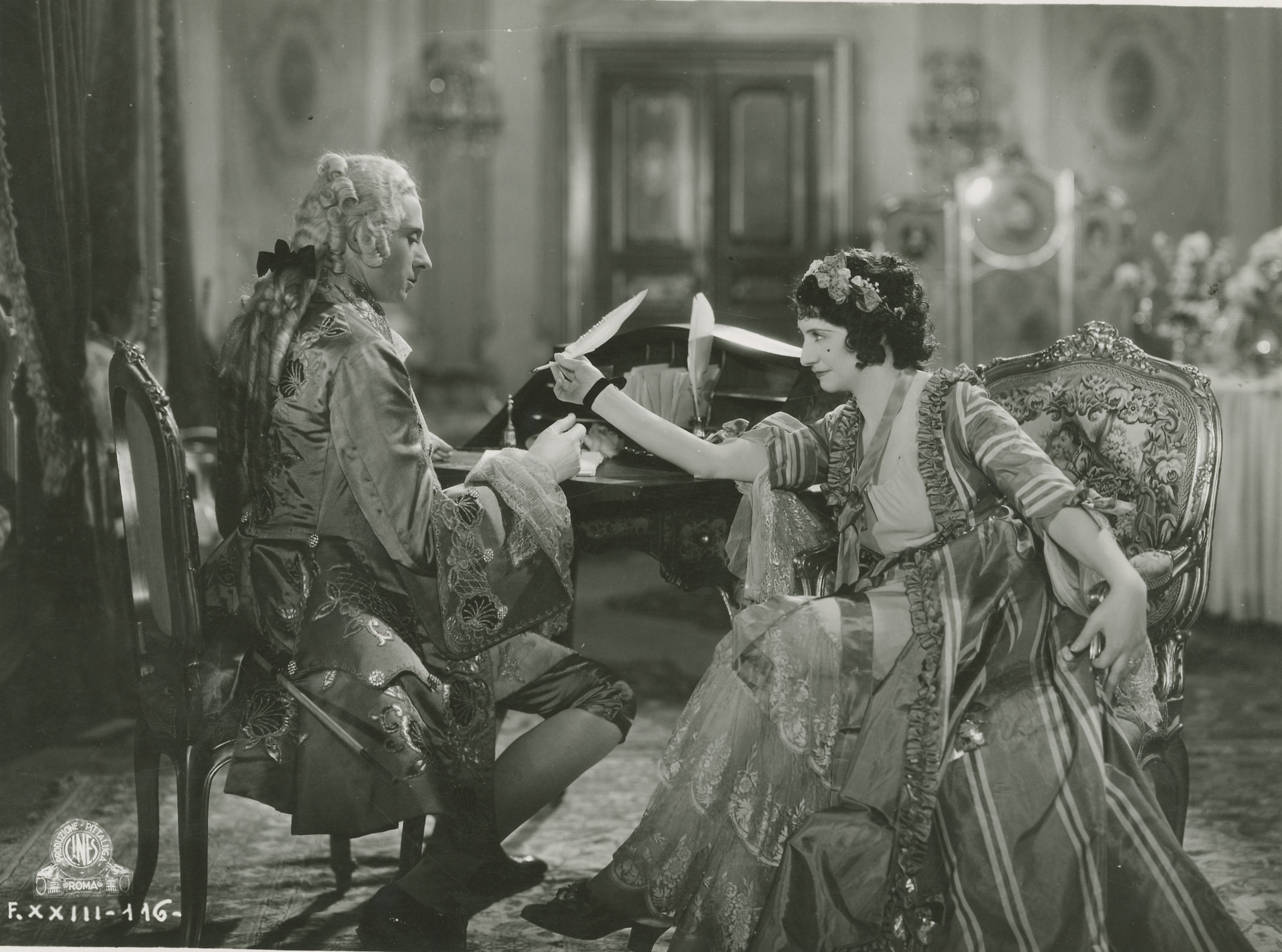
- Directed by: Guido Brignone
- Written by: Gian Bistolfi
- Produced by: Baldassarre Negroni
- Starring: Elio Steiner; Dria Paola; Tina Lattanzi
- Cinematography: Ubaldo Arata
- Edited by: Guy Simon
- Music by: Giovanni Battista Pergolesi
- Production company: Società Italiana Cines
- Distributed by: Società Italiana Cines
- Release date: 29 September 1932
- Running time: 80 minutes
- Country: Italy
- Language: Italian

Pergolesi is a 1932 Italian historical musical film directed by Guido Brignone and starring Elio Steiner, Dria Paola and Tina Lattanzi. It portrays the brief life of the eighteenth-century Italian composer Giovanni Battista Pergolesi. It was shot at the Cines Studios in Rome. A separate French-language version Les amours de Pergolèse was released the following year.

== Cast ==
- Elio Steiner as Giovanni Battista Pergolesi
- Dria Paola as Maria di Tor Delfina
- Tina Lattanzi as Erminia
- Livio Pavanelli as Nicola d'Arcangeli
- Carlo Lombardi as Raniero di Tor Delfina
- Mina D'Albore as La cantate
- Lydia Simoneschi as La cameriera Nicoletta
- Gemma Schirato as Didone
- Romolo Costa as Ilario de Nerestra
- Giacomo Almirante as Il maestro Lambrughi
- Roberto Pasetti as Il notaio Verlupi
- Giuseppe Pierozzi as Il critico teatrale
- Cecyl Tryan as La modista
- Vasco Creti
- Olinto Cristina
- Carlo Simoneschi
- Franco Schirato
- Amedeo Trilli
- Vincenzo Bettoni as Cantanto
- Laura Pasini as Cantanta

== Bibliography ==
- Mitchell, Charles P. The Great Composers Portrayed on Film, 1913 through 2002. McFarland, 2004.
