= La grande rinuncia =

La Grande rinuncia
- Directed by: Aldo Vergano
- Music by: Giuseppe Rosati
- Release date: 1 September 1951
- Country: Italy
- Language: Italian

La Grande rinuncia (The Great Waiver) is a 1951 Italian melodrama film directed by Aldo Vergano.

== Cast ==
- Lea Padovani as Elisabetta / Suor Teresa
- Luigi Tosi
- Luigi Pavese
