= Don Bosco (1935 film) =

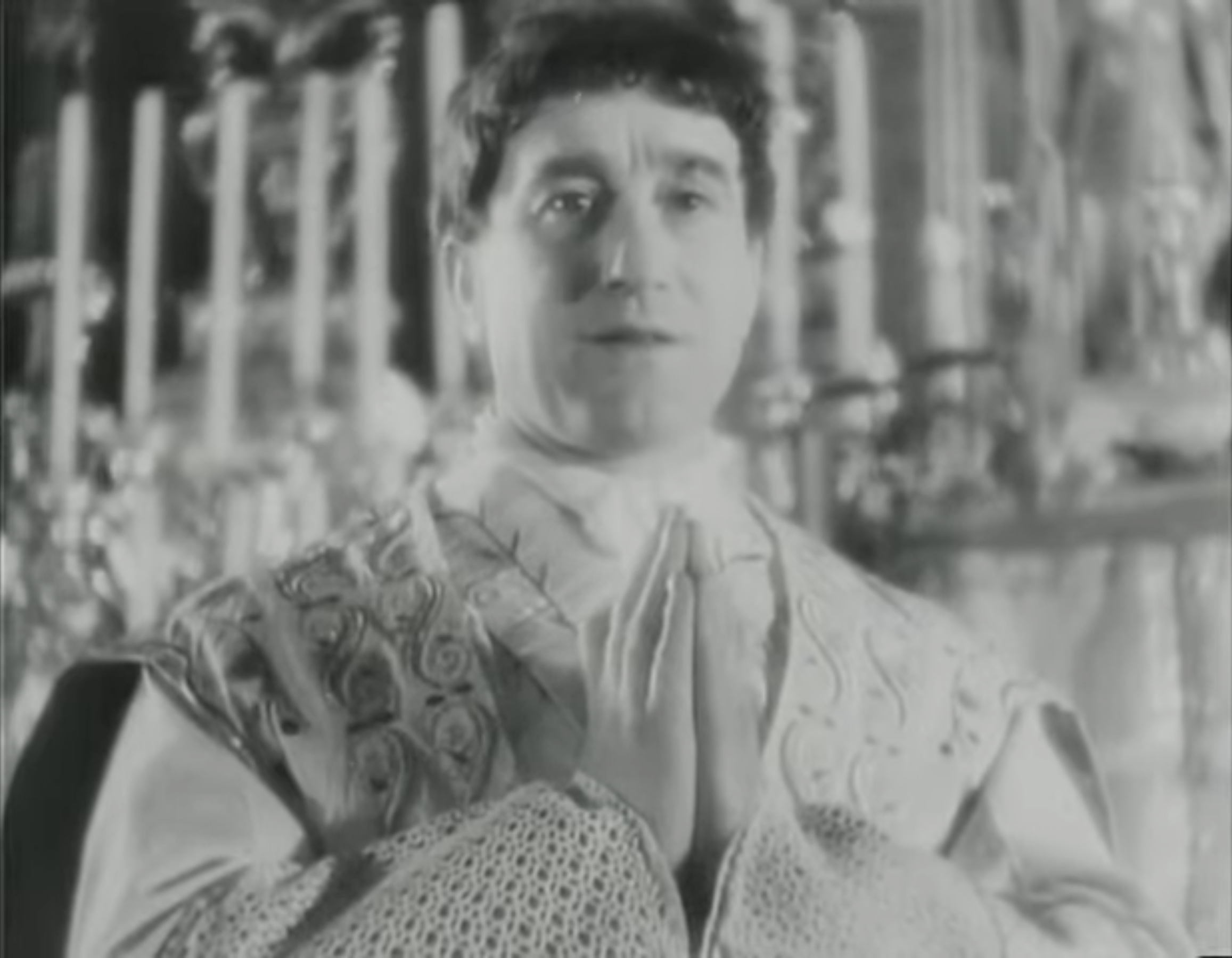
- Gianpaolo Rosmino as Don Bosco
- Directed by: Goffredo Alessandrini
- Written by: Sergio Amidei; Onorato Castellino; Rufillo Uguccioni; Aldo Vergano; Goffredo Alessandrini
- Starring: Gianpaolo Rosmino; Maria Vincenza Stiffi; Ferdinando Mayer
- Cinematography: Arturo Gallea
- Edited by: Giorgio Simonelli
- Music by: Giorgio Federico Ghedini
- Production company: Lux Film
- Release date: 1935
- Running time: 90 minutes
- Country: Italy
- Language: Italian

Don Bosco is a 1935 Italian drama film directed by Goffredo Alessandrini and starring Gianpaolo Rosmino, Maria Vincenza Stiffi and Ferdinando Mayer. The film is a portrayal of the life of the Catholic Priest John Bosco (1815–1888). It was made by Riccardo Gualino's Lux Film, one of the bigger Italian companies of the era. Alessandrini later went on to direct a later, more celebrated biopic of a nineteenth century religious figure with his Cardinal Messias (1939).

== Cast ==
- Gianpaolo Rosmino as Don Giovanni Bosco
- Maria Vincenza Stiffi as Margherita, sua madre
- Ferdinando Mayer as Giovanni Bosco as child
- Roberto Pasetti
- Vittorio Vaser
- Felice Minotti
- Cesare Gani Carini
- Arturo Zan

== Bibliography ==
- Moliterno, Gino. The A to Z of Italian Cinema. Scarecrow Press, 2009.
