= The Night of Tricks =

1939 film directed by Carlo Campogalliani

- Directed by: Carlo Campogalliani
- Written by: Guglielmo Zorzi (play); Alberto Donini (play); Sergio Amidei; Aldo Vergano
- Produced by: Michele Macchia; Alfonso Ruo
- Starring: Amedeo Nazzari; Dria Paola; Maurizio D'Ancora
- Cinematography: Piero Pupilli
- Edited by: Ignazio Ferronetti
- Music by: Ettore Montanaro
- Production company: Iris Film
- Distributed by: Generalcine
- Release date: 11 December 1939
- Running time: 68 minutes
- Country: Italy
- Language: Italian

The Night of Tricks (Italian: La notte delle beffe) is a 1939 Italian "white-telephones" comedy film directed by Carlo Campogalliani and starring Amedeo Nazzari, Dria Paola and Maurizio D'Ancora.

It was shot at Cinecittà Studios in Rome. The film's sets were designed by the art director Nino Maccarones.

== Cast ==
- Amedeo Nazzari as Capatosta
- Dria Paola as Giulietta
- Maurizio D'Ancora as Filippo
- Elli Parvo as Maria, la figlia dell'oste
- Olga Capri as Assunta
- Ernesto Almirante as Francesco Acquaviva
- Achille Majeroni as Righetti
- Giovanni Petti as Gennaro, l'oste
- Andrea Checchi as Giorgio Albini
- Arnaldo Arnaldi as Pallotta
- Giuseppe Pierozzi as Pietro
- Oscar Andriani as Un falso brigante
- Lia Orlandini as Ersilia
- Alberto Sordi as Bentivoglio
- Mario Lodolini as Uno studente

== Bibliography ==
- Moliterno, Gino. Historical Dictionary of Italian Cinema. Scarecrow Press, 2008.
