= Sad Loves =

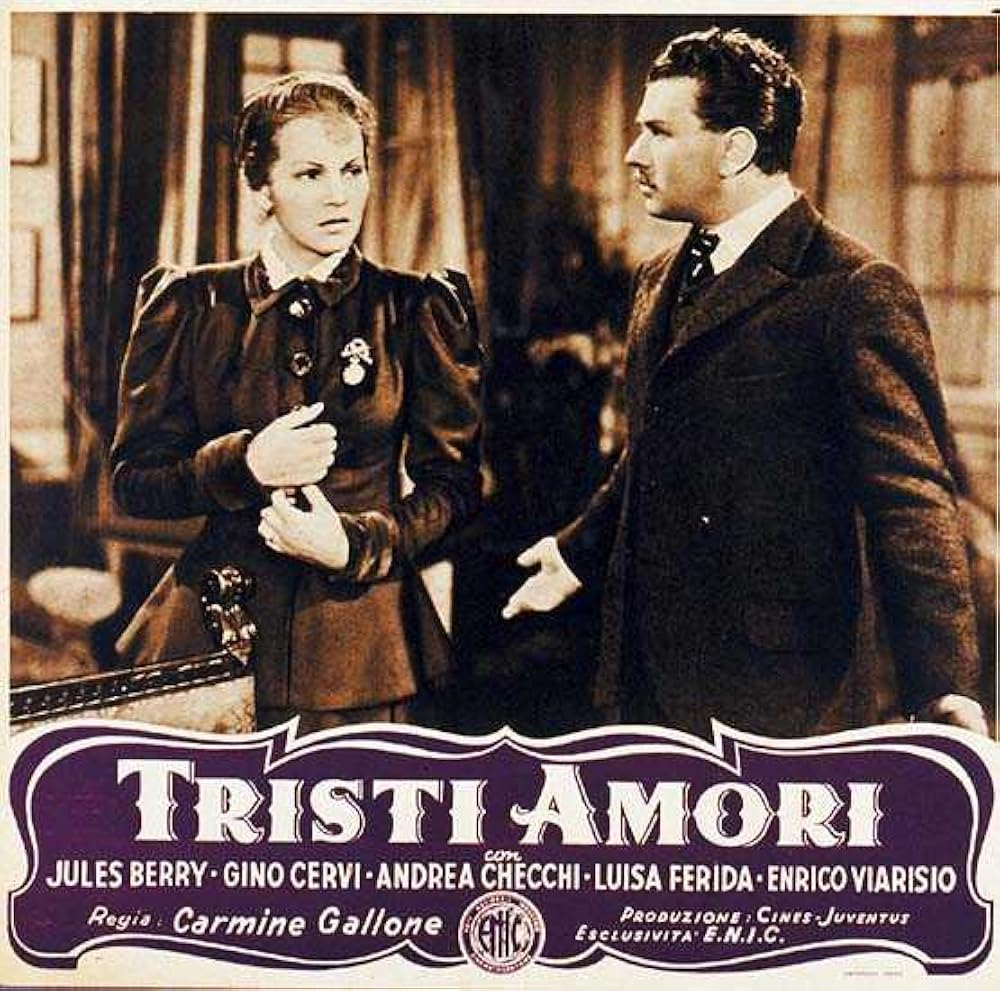
- Directed by: Carmine Gallone
- Written by: Giuseppe Giacosa (play); Giacomo De Benedetti; Sergio Amidei; Carmine Gallone
- Starring: Jules Berry; Gino Cervi; Andrea Checchi; Luisa Ferida
- Cinematography: Anchise Brizzi
- Edited by: Niccolò Lazzari
- Music by: Alessandro Cicognini
- Production companies: Juventus Film; Società Italiana Cines
- Distributed by: ENIC
- Release date: 7 October 1943
- Running time: 92 minutes
- Country: Italy
- Language: Italian

Sad Loves (Italian: Tristi amori) is a 1943 Italian historical drama film directed by Carmine Gallone and starring Jules Berry, Gino Cervi and Andrea Checchi. It was based on the play of the same title by Giuseppe Giacosa. It was made at Cinecittà in Rome. It is set in the 1880s.

== Cast ==
- Jules Berry as Il conte Ettore Arcieri
- Gino Cervi as Giulio Scarli
- Andrea Checchi as Fabrizio Arcieri
- Luisa Ferida as Emma Scarli
- Giuseppe Varni as Il cavaliere Rublo
- Enrico Viarisio as Adriano Rainetti
- Luigi Allodoli as Giustino, il commesso dello studio Scarli
- Antonio Anselmo as Il tenente Rovi
- Amelia Bissi as Marta
- Gemma Bolognesi as La cassiera del Caffè 'Doria'
- Margherita Bossi as La signora Rublo
- Ruggero Capodaglio as Il dottore Brusio
- Ernesto Collo as Il socio palermitano
- Enzo Gainotti as Un socio del Circolo
- Toscano Giuntini as Un' ufficiale
- Luciano Manara as Un' ufficiale di Stato Maggiore
- Giuseppe Pierozzi as Il sarto
- Livia Venturini as La signorina Rublo
- Renato Malavasi as Il ragionere del Circolo
- Giorgio Fini as Un' ufficiale
- Andrea Volo as Un' ufficiale

== Bibliography ==
- Nowell-Smith, Geoffrey; Hay, James; Volpi, Gianni (1996). The Companion to Italian Cinema. 1996: Cassell. ISBN 978-0304341979.
