= The Man with the Claw =

1931 film directed by Nunzio Malasomma

- Directed by: Nunzio Malasomma
- Written by: Aldo Vergano; Rudolph Cartier; Egon Eis; Otto Eis; Nunzio Malasomma
- Starring: Dria Paola; Carlo Fontana; Elio Steiner; Vasco Creti
- Cinematography: Carlo Montuori
- Edited by: Guy Simon
- Music by: Felice Montagnini
- Production company: Società Italiana Cines
- Distributed by: Societa Anonima Stefano Pittaluga
- Release date: November 1931
- Running time: 80 minutes
- Country: Italy
- Language: Italian

The Man with the Claw (Italian: L'uomo dall'artiglio) is a 1931 Italian mystery film directed by Nunzio Malasomma and starring Dria Paola, Carlo Fontana, and Elio Steiner. It was made at the Cines Studios in Rome with sets designed by the art director Daniele Crespi . The film is one of several regarded as a possible precursor to the later giallo genre. A separate German version The Paw was also produced.

== Synopsis ==
A series of violent murders are carried out by an escaped criminal, armed with a strange claw.

== Cast ==
- Dria Paola as La dottoressa Renata Vigo
- Carlo Fontana as Pietro Kruger
- Elio Steiner as Gastel
- Vasco Creti as Il commissario
- Carola Lotti as Gina Rappis
- Carlo Lombardi as Carlo Lopez
- Carlo Gualandri as Rappis
- Gino Viotti as Alberti
- Augusto Bandini
- Giuseppe N. Bellini
- Fedele Gentile
- Lucia Parisi

== Bibliography ==
- Moliterno, Gino. A to Z of Italian Cinema. Scarecrow Press, 2009.
