= Fanny (1933 film) =

1933 film

- Directed by: Mario Almirante
- Written by: Alessandro De Stefani; Raffaello Matarazzo
- Based on: Fanny; 1929 play by Marcel Pagnol
- Starring: Dria Paola; Alfredo De Sanctis; Mino Doro
- Cinematography: Domenico Scala; Massimo Terzano
- Edited by: Mario Almirante
- Music by: Ezio Carabella
- Production company: Società Italiana Cines
- Distributed by: Cinès-Pittaluga
- Release date: 1 September 1933
- Running time: 96 minutes
- Country: Italy
- Language: Italian

Fanny is a 1933 Italian comedy film directed by Mario Almirante and starring Dria Paola, Alfredo De Sanctis and Mino Doro. It is an adaptation of Marcel Pagnol's 1931 play Fanny. The play is the sequel to Pagnol's 1929 play Marius and the second part in his Marseille trilogy. The film's art direction was by Gastone Medin.

== Cast ==
- Dria Paola as Fanny
- Alfredo De Sanctis as Cesare
- Mino Doro as Mario
- Lamberto Picasso as Panizza
- Olga Capri as Onoria
- Umberto Sacripante as Mangiapane

== Bibliography ==
- Goble, Alan. The Complete Index to Literary Sources in Film. Walter de Gruyter, 1999.
