= The Four Musketeers (1936 film) =

- Directed by: Carlo Campogalliani
- Written by: Riccardo Morbelli; Angelo Nizza
- Based on: The Three Musketeers; 1844 novel by Alexandre Dumas
- Cinematography: Luigi Fiorio; Giovanni Vitrotti
- Edited by: Carlo Campogalliani
- Music by: Egidio Storaci
- Production company: Miniatura Film
- Release date: 1936
- Running time: 70 minutes
- Country: Italy
- Language: Italian

The Four Musketeers (Italian: I quattro moschettieri) is a 1936 Italian adventure film directed by Carlo Campogalliani. It is based on the 1844 novel The Three Musketeers by Alexandre Dumas. It reportedly involved the use of three thousand Marionettes.

== Bibliography ==
- Moliterno, Gino. The A to Z of Italian Cinema. Scarecrow Press, 2009.
