= Cronaca nera =

- Directed by: Giorgio Bianchi
- Written by: Sergio Amidei; Giorgio Bianchi; Gaspare Cataldo; Cesare Zavattini
- Starring: María Denis; Gino Cervi; Andrea Checchi
- Cinematography: Domenico Scala; Massimo Terzano
- Edited by: Gisa Radicchi Levi
- Music by: Alessandro Cicognini
- Production company: Aura Film
- Distributed by: Titanus Distribuzione
- Release date: 15 February 1947
- Running time: 90 minutes
- Country: Italy
- Language: Italian

Cronaca nera (Italian for Black news) is a 1947 Italian crime film directed by Giorgio Bianchi and starring María Denis, Gino Cervi and Andrea Checchi. The title refers to the section given over to crime stories in Italian newspapers.

== Plot synopsis ==
A mob boss (Gino Cervi) wanted by the police takes refuge at the home of his unsuspecting associate's (Andrea Checchi) honest family, aiming to regroup his gang again when the time is right. In the process, he falls in love with his associate’s sister (María Denis) and decides to go straight.

== Critical reception ==
On the occasion of Cronaca nera's 2015 showing on Harvard's film program, the film was described as "neorealist cinema itself" and as "exemplifying the fatalism associated with noir" in "films such as Ossessione (1943)." The program also noted that "among the film’s screenwriters are Sergio Amidei and Cesare Zavattini, who between them worked on most of the postwar masterpieces by Rossellini and de Sica."

== Cast ==
- María Denis
- Gino Cervi
- Andrea Checchi
- Giuseppe Porelli
- Luigi Almirante
- Manoel Roero
- Renato Chiantoni
- Marisa Vernati
- Giannina Chiantoni
- Jucci Kellerman
- Luigi Pavese
- Armando Guarnieri

== Bibliography ==
- Stewart, John (2012). Italian Film: A Who's Who. McFarland & Company. ISBN 978-0786467563.
