= Renato Malavasi =

Italian actor

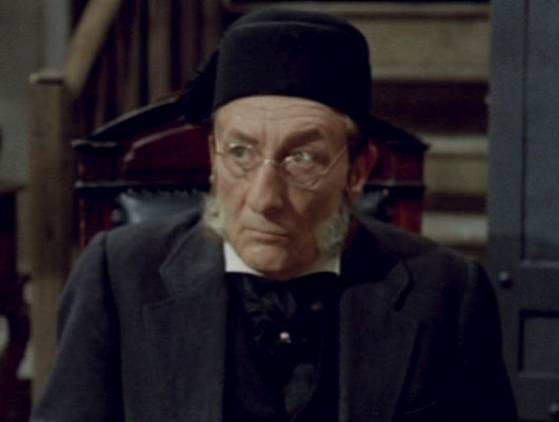
- Malavasi in Angeli senza paradiso (1970)
- Born: 8 August 1904; Verona, Italy
- Died: 7 October 1998 (aged 94); Verona, Italy
- Occupation: Actor
- Years active: 1921-1985

Renato Malavasi (8 August 1904 – 7 October 1998) was an Italian film actor. He appeared in 135 films between 1921 and 1985.

== Selected filmography ==
- The Golden Vein (1928)
- The Song of Love (1930)
- Lowered Sails (1931)
- The Private Secretary (1931)
- Resurrection (1931)
- A Woman Between Two Worlds (1936)
- King of Diamonds (1936)
- To Live (1937)
- Star of the Sea (1938)
- For Men Only (1938)
- A Thousand Lire a Month (1939)
- The First Woman Who Passes (1940)
- La zia smemorata (1940)
- Two on a Vacation (1940)
- Kean (1940)
- Caravaggio (1941)
- The Brambilla Family Go on Holiday (1941)
- A Husband for the Month of April (1941)
- The Hero of Venice (1941)
- Idyll in Budapest (1941)
- Sad Loves (1943)
- A Living Statue (1943)
- The Man with the Grey Glove (1948)
- The Walls of Malapaga (1949)
- Against the Law (1950)
- Variety Lights (1950)
- Feathers in the Wind (1950)
- Ring Around the Clock (1950)
- Beauties on Motor Scooters (1952)
- Final Pardon (1952)
- Deceit (1952)
- Cavalcade of Song (1953)
- Disowned (1954)
- House of Ricordi (1954)
- Desperate Farewell (1955)
- The Courier of Moncenisio (1956)
- I 2 deputati (1968)
- The Beasts (1971)
- Who Killed the Prosecutor and Why? (1972)
- Master of Love (1972)
- The Family Vice (1975)
- La bolognese (1975)
- Return of Shanghai Joe (1975)
