= The Doctor in Spite of Himself (1931 film) =

1931 film directed by Carlo Campogalliani

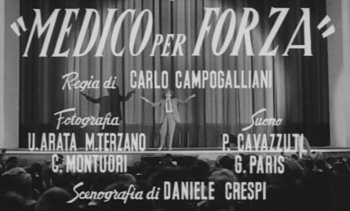
- Directed by: Carlo Campogalliani
- Written by: Carlo Campogalliani; Molière (play); Ettore Petrolini
- Starring: Ettore Petrolini; Tilde Mercandalli; Letizia Quaranta
- Cinematography: Ubaldo Arata
- Edited by: Carlo Campogalliani
- Music by: Pietro Sassòli
- Production company: Società Italiana Cines
- Distributed by: Societa Anonima Stefano Pittaluga
- Release date: February 1931
- Running time: 55 minutes
- Country: Italy
- Language: Italian

The Doctor in Spite of Himself (Italian: Medico per forza) is a 1931 Italian comedy film directed by Carlo Campogalliani. It is a free adaptation of Molière's play Le Médecin malgré lui. It was made at the Cines Studios in Rome.

After starring the comedy, for many times in the theaters, Ettore Petrolini reinvents Sganarelle, in a way close to the character Bertoldo of Giulio Cesare Croce. Referring to Petrolini, the film critic Filippo Sacchi had written "You have to accept it as it is, with his temperament and his admirable qualities ... with the grotesque and the joke that elude even without logic in the comic genre"

== Cast ==
- Ettore Petrolini as Sganarello
- Tilde Mercandalli as Lucinda
- Letizia Quaranta as Martina
- Augusto Contardi as Geronte
- Sergio Rovida as Leandro
- Elma Krimer as the nurse
- Dria Paola
- Enzo De Felice
- Checco Durante

== Bibliography ==
- Moliterno, Gino. The A to Z of Italian Cinema. Scarecrow Press, 2009.
