= When Naples Sings (1930 film) =

1930 film

- American release poster
- Directed by: Mario Almirante
- Written by: Mario Almirante
- Starring: Malcolm Tod
- Cinematography: Ubaldo Arata; Massimo Terzano
- Edited by: Mario Almirante
- Music by: Ernesto Tagliaferri
- Production company: Fert Film
- Distributed by: Cinès-Pittaluga
- Release date: October 1930
- Running time: 72 minutes
- Country: Italy
- Language: Italian

When Naples Sings (Italian: Napoli che canta) is a 1930 Italian musical film directed by Mario Almirante and starring Malcolm Tod. The film was originally made in 1928 as a silent film but delays, including the addition of sound, meant it was not released for two years. It consists almost entirely of recorded Neapolitan songs It was shot at the FERT Studios in Turin. The film enjoyed some success, and was distributed in seven South American countries. It has been described as a "poorly made musical film".

== Cast ==
- Malcolm Tod as Genny D'Ambrosio
- Anna Mari as Alice Baldwin
- Lilian Lyl as Carmela
- Giorgio Curti as Taniello
- Carlo Tedeschi
- Nino Altieri
- Camillo De Rossi
- Elvira Marchionni
- Giovanni Marcial
- Felice Minotti
- Ellen Meis
- Adriana Facchetti

== Bibliography ==
- Mancini, Elaine. Struggles of the Italian film industry during fascism, 1930-1935. UMI Research Press, 1985.
