= Steel (1933 film) =

- Directed by: Walter Ruttmann
- Written by: Luigi Pirandello (novel); Stefano Landi; Mario Soldati; Emilio Cecchi; Walter Ruttmann
- Produced by: Emilio Cecchi; Baldassarre Negroni
- Starring: Piero Pastore; Isa Pola; Vittorio Bellaccini; Alfredo Polveroni
- Cinematography: Domenico Scala; Massimo Terzano
- Edited by: Giuseppe Fatigati; Walter Ruttmann
- Music by: Gian Francesco Malipiero
- Production company: Società Italiana Cines
- Distributed by: Cinès-Pittaluga
- Release date: 31 March 1933
- Running time: 67 minutes
- Country: Italy
- Language: Italian

Steel (Italian: Acciaio) is a 1933 Italian drama film directed by Walter Ruttmann and starring Piero Pastore, Isa Pola and Vittorio Bellaccini. The film was shot on location at the steel mills in Terni in Umbria. It was based on the novel Giuoca, Pietro! by Luigi Pirandello. With its semi-documentary style it was one of a number of films made in the Fascist era that serve as a precursor to Italian neorealism which emerged in the mid-1940s.

== Synopsis ==
Two steelworkers engage in a violent rivalry over a woman.

== Cast ==
- Piero Pastore as Mario Velini
- Isa Pola as Gina
- Vittorio Bellaccini as Pietro Ricci
- Alfredo Polveroni as Pietro's father
- Olga Capri as Pietro's mother
- Romano Calò
- Romolo Costa
- Domenico Serra
- Giulio Massarotti
- Arcangelo Aversa
- Enzo Paglierici
- Luigi Erminio D'Olivo

== Bibliography ==
- Bondanella, Peter. A History of Italian Cinema. Continuum, 2009.
- Moliterno, Gino. The A to Z of Italian Cinema. Scarecrow Press, 2009.
