= A Woman Between Two Worlds =

1936 film

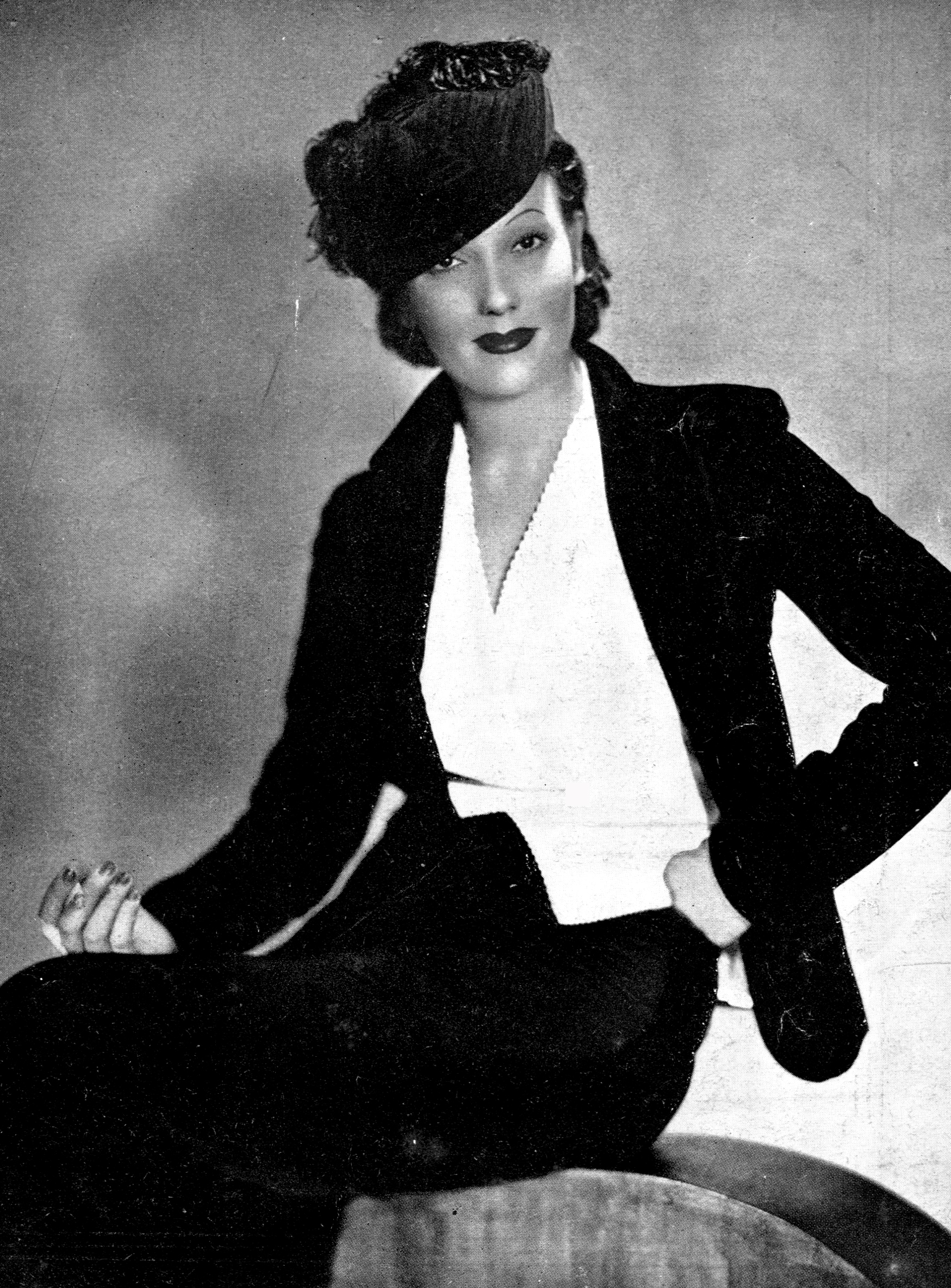
- Still with Isa Miranda
- Directed by: Goffredo Alessandrini
- Written by: Ludwig von Wohl (novel); Corrado Alvaro; Georg C. Klaren
- Starring: Isa Miranda; Assia Noris; Giulio Donadio; Mario Ferrari
- Cinematography: Ubaldo Arata
- Edited by: Fernando Tropea
- Music by: Franz Grothe
- Production company: ICAR
- Distributed by: Variety Distribution
- Release date: 1936
- Running time: 76 minutes
- Country: Italy
- Language: Italian

A Woman Between Two Worlds (Italian: Una donna tra due mondi) is a 1936 Italian white telephone drama film directed by Goffredo Alessandrini and starring Isa Miranda, Assia Noris and Giulio Donadio. The film's sets were designed by art director Hans Ledersteger. It is the Italian version of the German film The Love of the Maharaja. The film largely takes place in a grand hotel setting.

It was shot at the Cines Studios in Rome.

The story follows a pianist who must choose between her quartet's cellist and an Indian maharajah she meets while touring with the ensemble. The maharajah, however, remains haunted by the memory of his deceased former lover.

== Cast ==
- Isa Miranda as Mina Salviati
- Assia Noris as Daisy Atkins
- Giulio Donadio as Suraj
- Váša Příhoda as Saverio Lancia
- Mario Ferrari as dottor Lawburn
- Oreste Bilancia as Saverio Lancia
- Tatiana Pavoni as Mimi
- Ernesto Sabatini as Lord Winston
- Vinicio Sofia as l'amministratore di Trenchman
- Renato Malavasi as il segretario di Trenchman
- Alfredo Martinelli as Il barbiere
- Gino Viotti as Il direttore dell'hotel
- Olinto Cristina
- Carlo Petrangeli

== Bibliography ==
- Clarke, David B. & Doel, Marcus A. Moving Pictures/Stopping Places: Hotels and Motels on Film. Lexington Books, 2009.
