= Giorgio Federico Ghedini =

Italian composer (1892–1965)

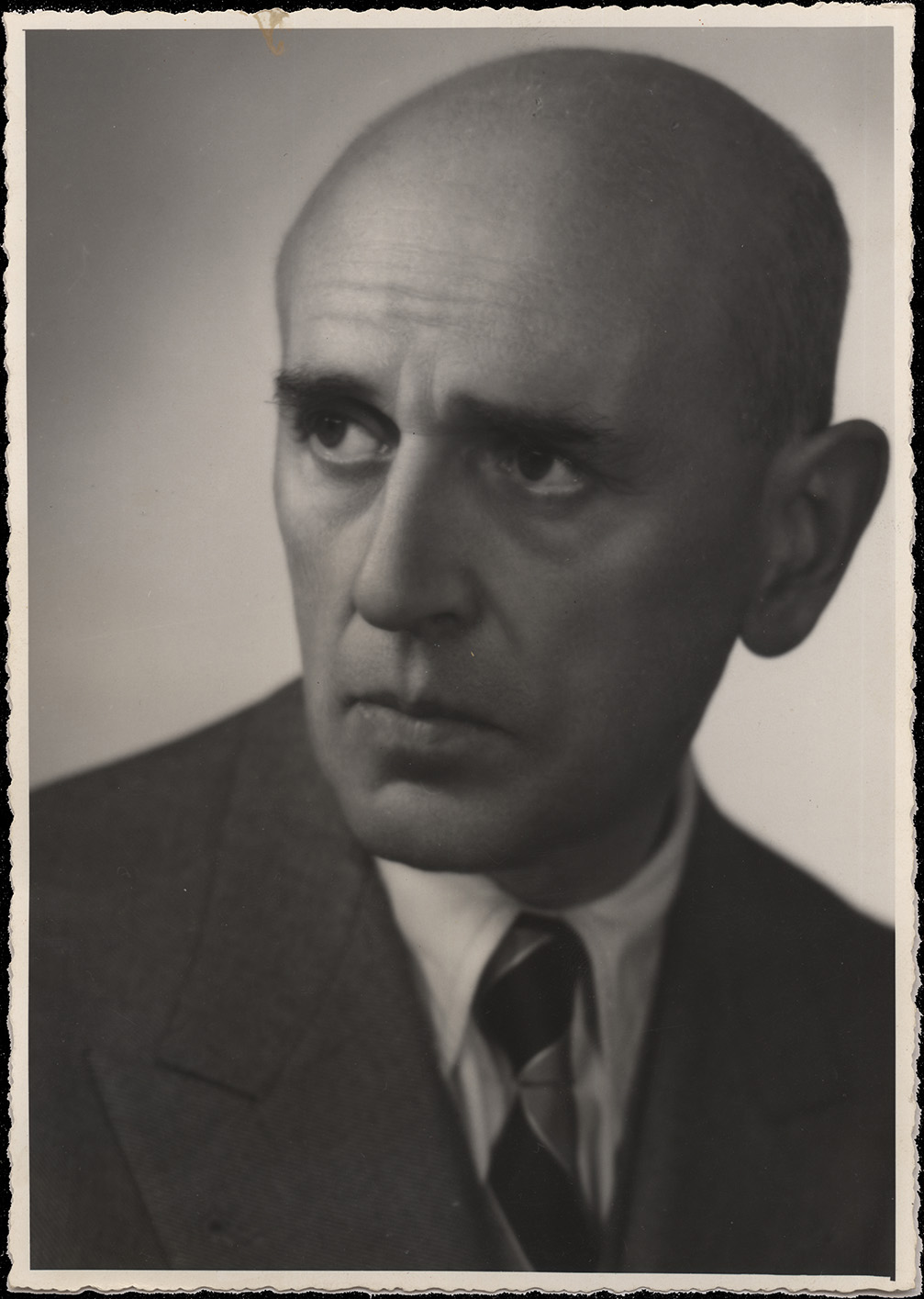
Giorgio Federico Ghedini in 1948

Giorgio Federico Ghedini (11 July 1892 – 25 March 1965) was an Italian composer. In addition to orchestral works, in 1949 he premiered a one-act opera based on Billy Budd by Herman Melville.

== Life ==
Ghedini was born in Cuneo in 1892. He studied organ, piano and composition in Turin, then graduated in composition from the Bologna Conservatory under Marco Enrico Bossi in 1911. He worked as a conductor for a certain time, then he gave up to devote himself to teaching.

He worked as a teacher of composition at the Turin Conservatory (1918–1937), Parma Conservatory (1937–1941), and finally the Milan Conservatory (1951–1962). Among his pupils, the most eminent were Marcello and Claudio Abbado, Luciano Berio, Guido Cantelli, Niccolò Castiglioni, Carlo Pinelli, and Fiorenzo Carpi.

Guido Cantelli conducted the NBC Symphony Orchestra in a 2 February 1952 broadcast concert of Ghedini's Pezzo concertante for two violins, viola, and orchestra.

He died in Nervi, near Genoa, in 1965.

== Style ==
The composer was a deep lover of ancient music; he transcribed many works by such composers as Girolamo Frescobaldi, Claudio Monteverdi, and Andrea and Giovanni Gabrieli. Ghedini's works are often inspired by music from the Renaissance and Baroque eras, but combined with a very personal language which combines ancient and modern styles. Among his masterworks are a Concerto for orchestra (in memory of Guido Cantelli), two violin concertos Il Belprato and Concentus Basiliensis, and a concerto for two cellos L'Olmeneta (The Elm Grove) and Musica Notturna (Night Music).

Ghedini's most celebrated concert piece is Concerto dell'Albatro (Albatross Concerto) for violin, cello, piano, narrator and orchestra, which includes fragments from Herman Melville's novel Moby-Dick in its final movement.

He wrote a large number of chamber, vocal and choral works. He also wrote a one-act opera based on Melville's Billy Budd, which was first performed in 1949.

== Works ==
Orchestral

- Partita (1926)
- Pezzo Concertante, for two violins, viola and orchestra (1931)
- Marinaresca e bacchanale for orchestra (1933)
- Concerto for Orchestra "Architetture" (1939–40)
- Invenzione, concerto for cello, timpani, cymbals and orchestra (1940)
- Concertato, for flute, viola and harp (1941)
- Concerto dell'albatro, for violin, cello, piano, narrator and orchestra (1943)
- Il belprato, violin concerto (1947)
- L'olmeneta (The Elm Grove), concerto for two cellos and orchestra (1951)
- Concerto for viola, viola d'amore, and string orchestra (1953)
- Musica da Concerto, for Viola and String Orchestra (1953)
- Studio da concerto, for guitar (1959)
- Contrappunti, for violin, viola, cello and orchestra (1962)
- Musica concertante, for cello and orchestra (1962)

Piano

- Mazurka (1908)
- 29 Canoni (1910)
- Tema con variazioni sulla parola "Fede" (1911)
- La ballerina del circo equestre che salta sulla corda (1912)
- Minuetto del galletto nano (1912)
- Gavotta (1912)
- Sonatina in D major (1913)
- Nove pezzi (1914)
- Minuettocaricatura (1916)
- Puerilia. 4 little pieces on 5 notes (1922)
- Sonata in A flat major (1922)
- Fantasia (1927)
- Divertimento contrappuntistico (1940)
- Capriccio (1943)
- Ricercare super “Sicut cervus desiderat ad fontes aquarum” (1944, rev. 1956)

Operas

- Gringoire (1915)
- Maria d'Alessandria (1937)
- Re Hassan (1939)
- La pulce d'oro (1940)
- Le baccanti (1948)
- Billy Budd (1949), one act
- Lord Inferno (1952) (winner of the Prix Italia in 1952)
- Girotondo (1959)
- La via della croce (1961)

Film scores

- Don Bosco (1935)
- Pietro Micca (1938)
- The Widow (1939)

== Bibliography ==
- Parise, Stefano (2003). Giorgio Federico Ghedini. L'uomo, le opere attraverso le lettere, pref. by A.Lanza. Milano: Ricordi. p. 423. ISBN 88-7592-727-8.
- Lanza, Andrea (2008). "An Outline of Italian Instrumental Music in the 20th Century". Sonus. A Journal of Investigations into Global Musical Possibilities. 29/1: 1–21. ISSN 0739-229X.
