= Ubaldo Arata =

Italian cinematographer

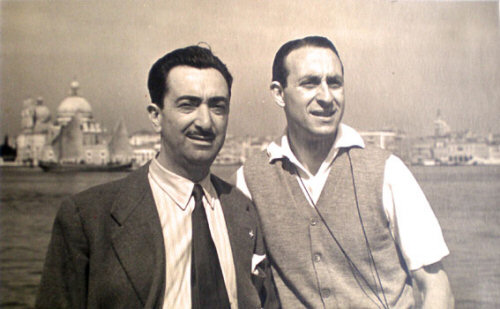
- Ubaldo Arata, at left, with colleague Romolo Garroni, 1942
- Born: 23 March 1895; Ovada, Italy
- Died: 7 December 1947 (aged 52); Rome, Italy
- Occupation: Cinematographer
- Years active: 1918–1947

Ubaldo Arata (23 March 1895 – 7 December 1947) was an Italian cinematographer. Arata worked on more than a hundred films between 1918 and his death in 1947. Arata entered cinema in the silent era and worked prolifically during the 1920s including on one of the final entries into the long running Maciste series. He was employed on the first Italian sound film The Song of Love (1930). Until the fall of Fascism, he was one of the leading Italian cinematographers working on propaganda films such as Scipione l'africano (Scipio Africanus: The Defeat of Hannibal, 1937) and Luciano Serra, Pilot (1938) as well as more straightforward entertainment films.

Arata worked with Roberto Rossellini on the 1945 neorealist drama Rome, Open City. He was instrumental in securing the backing of the distribution company Minerva Film for the production's release. Following the Second World War, Arata worked on several co-productions with Britain and the United States.

== Selected filmography ==
- Zingari (1920)
- Maciste in Hell (1925)
- The Courier of Moncenisio (1927)
- The Last Tsars (1928)
- The Carnival of Venice (1928)
- Rails (1929)
- Judith and Holofernes (1929)
- The Song of Love (1930)
- When Naples Sings (1930)
- Courtyard (1931)
- The Doctor in Spite of Himself (1931)
- Before the Jury (1931)
- The Charmer (1931)
- Paradise (1932)
- La Wally (1932)
- Pergolesi (1932)
- The Last Adventure (1932)
- Together in the Dark (1933)
- I'll Always Love You (1933)
- Everybody's Woman (1934)
- The Little Schoolmistress (1934)
- Lady of Paradise (1934)
- Just Married (1934)
- Unripe Fruit (1934)
- The Wedding March (1934)
- Villafranca (1934)
- Red Passport (1935)
- Ginevra degli Almieri (1935)
- Aldebaran (1935)
- King of Diamonds (1936)
- A Woman Between Two Worlds (1936)
- The Amnesiac (1936)
- The Love of the Maharaja (1936)
- Scipione l'africano (1937)
- Luciano Serra, Pilot (1938)
- The Widow (1939)
- Angelica (1939)
- Bridge of Glass (1940)
- The King's Jester (1941)
- A Woman Has Fallen (1941)
- The Story of Tosca (1941)
- Girl of the Golden West (1942)
- Carmen (1942)
- Life Begins Anew (1945)
- Rome, Open City (1945)
- The Innocent Casimiro (1945)
- The Adulteress (1946)
- Teheran (1946)
- Fatal Symphony (1947)
- Call of the Blood (1948)
- Black Magic (1949)

== Bibliography ==
- Liehm, Mira. Passion and Defiance: Film in Italy from 1942 to the Present. University of California Press, 1984.
- Wagstaff, Christopher. Italian Neorealist Cinema: An Aesthetic Approach. University of Toronto Press, 2007.
