= Cines =

Italian film production company

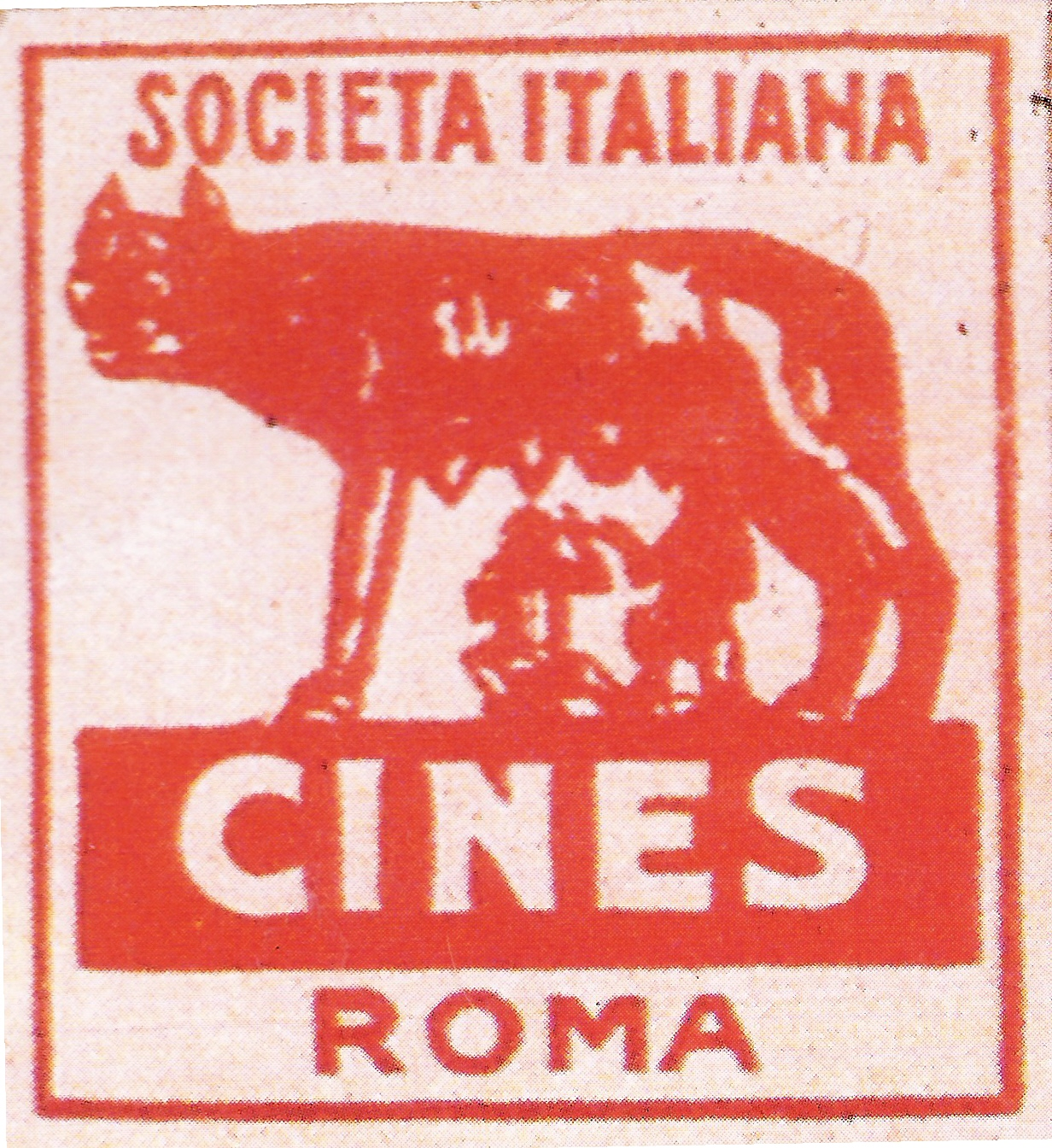
- Industry: Motion pictures
- Key people: Paolo Emilio Persiani (President)
- Products: Motion pictures

The Società Italiana Cines (Italian Cines Company) is a film company specializing in production and distribution of films. The company was founded on 1 April 1906.

A major force in the European film industry before the First World War, the company took part in the Paris Film Congress in 1909, a failed attempt to create a cartel similar to the MPPC in the United States. In 1926 the company was taken over by Stefano Pittaluga who oversaw production until his death in 1932. Emilio Cecchi served as head of production for a year following Pittaluga's death.

In 1930, at the time of the rebirth of Italian cinema, the old label had produced The Song of Love, the first sound film in Italy. The new Cines Studios were constructed in Rome and functioned as the country's most important film studios until they were destroyed in a fire in 1935. Under the leadership of Carlo Roncoroni it was involved in the state-backed project to build Cinecitta which opened in 1937. Following Roncoroni's death, the company was nationalised under the ENIC umbrella. It was relaunched in 1941 as part of the Fascist government's scheme to boost film production. It survived the fall of Mussolini and continued into the postwar era.

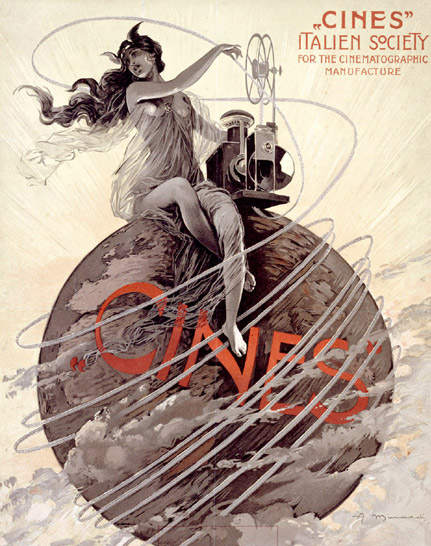

In 1956, he received the Nastro d'Argento for Best Producer. However, in 1958, the Cines ceased operations and was liquidated by the Finance Ministry.

In 2006, on the occasion of the centenary of the first foundation, through the work of the editorial group Persians Publisher - New Media Entertainment has been given life to a new cine, with an essentially private, who recovered the brand and the artistic legacy of the previous management.

== Selected filmography ==
- Beatrice Cenci (1909)
- Agrippina (1911)
- Quo Vadis (1913)
- Broken Idol (1913)
- Antony and Cleopatra (1913)
- Julius Caesar (1914)
- Hamlet (1917)
- Ivan the Terrible (1917)
- The Courier of Moncenisio (1927)
- Kif Tebbi (1928)
- The Song of Love (1930)
- Nerone (1930)
- When Naples Sings (1930)
- Courtyard (1931)
- Before the Jury (1931)
- Figaro e la Sua Gran Giornata (1931)
- Resurrection (1931)
- Mother Earth (1931)
- The Doctor in Spite of Himself (1931)
- The Devil's Lantern (1931)
- The Charmer (1931)
- Lowered Sails (1931)
- The Private Secretary (1931)
- The Man with the Claw (1931)
- Your Money or Your Life (1932)
- Paradise (1932)
- The Telephone Operator (1932)
- The Last Adventure (1932)
- Pergolesi (1932)
- The Opera Singer (1932)
- What Scoundrels Men Are! (1932)
- The Table of the Poor 1932)
- Palio (1932)
- The Blue Fleet (1932)
- The Haller Case (1933)
- Fanny (1933)
- Steel (1933)
- Model Wanted (1933)
- Together in the Dark (1933)
- Giallo (1933)
- The Last of the Bergeracs (1934)
- Seconda B (1934)
- Loyalty of Love (1934)
- Everybody's Woman (1934)
- 1860 (1934)
- A Woman Between Two Worlds (1936)
- After Casanova's Fashion (1942)
- The Jester's Supper (1942)
- Sleeping Beauty (1942)
- Before the Postman (1942)
- Music on the Run (1943)
- Sad Loves (1943)
- Two Hearts Among the Beasts (1943)
- Charley's Aunt (1943)
- Harlem (1943)
- The Innkeeper (1944)
- The Priest's Hat (1944)
- What a Distinguished Family (1945)
- Night Taxi (1950)
- Devotion (1950)
- Four Ways Out (1951)
- His Last Twelve Hours (1951)
- Honeymoon Deferred (1951)
- In Olden Days (1952)
- Leathernose (1952)
- I'm the Hero (1952)
- The Flame (1952)
- Finishing School (1953)
- A Hundred Years of Love (1954)
- Symphony of Love (1954)
- The Two Friends (1955)
- Wives and Obscurities (1956)

== Bibliography ==
- (in Italian)Riccardo Redi, La Cines. Storia di una casa di produzione italiana, Persiani Editore, Bologna 2009.
- Marina Nicoli. The Rise and Fall of the Italian Film Industry. Taylor & Francis, 2016.
