= Domenico Scala (cinematographer) =

Domenico Scala (26 March 1903 – 25 December 1989) was an Italian cinematographer. He was credited for more than 60 films. He worked with Aldo Tonti to create the distinctive look of Luchino Visconti's 1943 classic Ossessione. Other films with cinematography by Scala include Steel, The Blue Fleet, Escape to France and The Earth Cries Out.

== Selected filmography ==
- Lowered Sails (1931)
- The Opera Singer (1932)
- What Scoundrels Men Are! (1932)
- Fanny (1933)
- Ragazzo (1934)
- The Last Days of Pompeo (1937)
- The Knight of San Marco (1939)
- The Boarders at Saint-Cyr (1939)
- The Faceless Voice (1939)
- Big Shoes (1940)
- The Actor Who Disappeared (1941)
- Pirates of Malaya (1941)
- A Husband for the Month of April (1941)
- The Two Tigers (1941)
- Crime News (1947)
- Barrier to the North (1950)
- Miracle in Viggiù (1951)
- The Counterfeiters (1951)
- I, Hamlet (1952)
