= Kif Tebbi =

1928 film

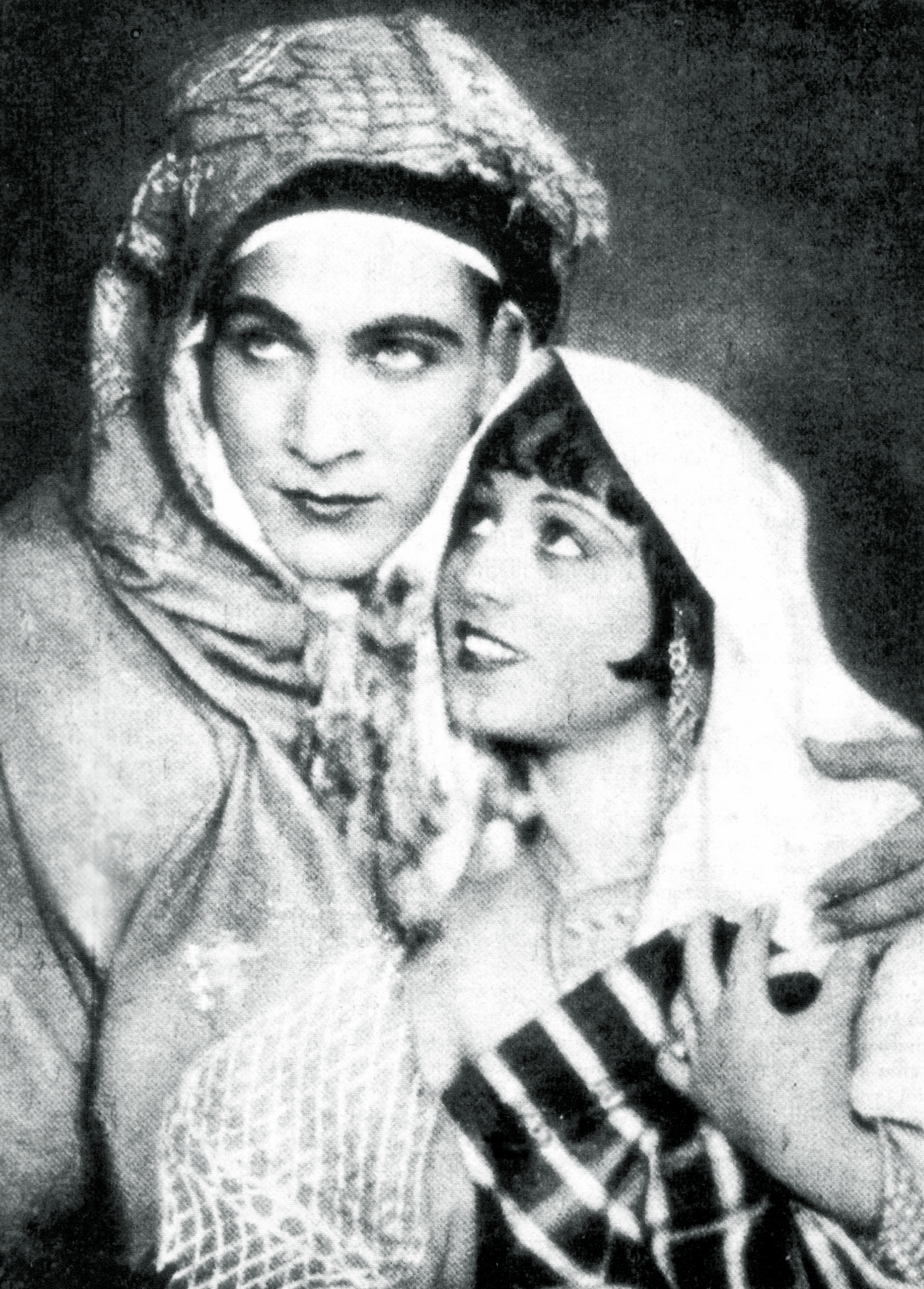
- Directed by: Mario Camerini
- Written by: Luciano Zuccoli (novel); Luciano Doria
- Cinematography: Ferdinando Martini
- Production companies: ADIA; Società Italiana Cines
- Distributed by: Società Italiana Cines
- Release date: December 1928
- Country: Italy
- Languages: Silent; Italian intertitles

Kif Tebbi is a 1928 Italian silent war film directed by Mario Camerini. The film portrays the Italo-Turkish War. A young Italian-educated Libyan nobleman is summoned to fight for the Ottoman Empire when war breaks out in 1911, but eventually decides to change sides and support Italy.

== Production ==
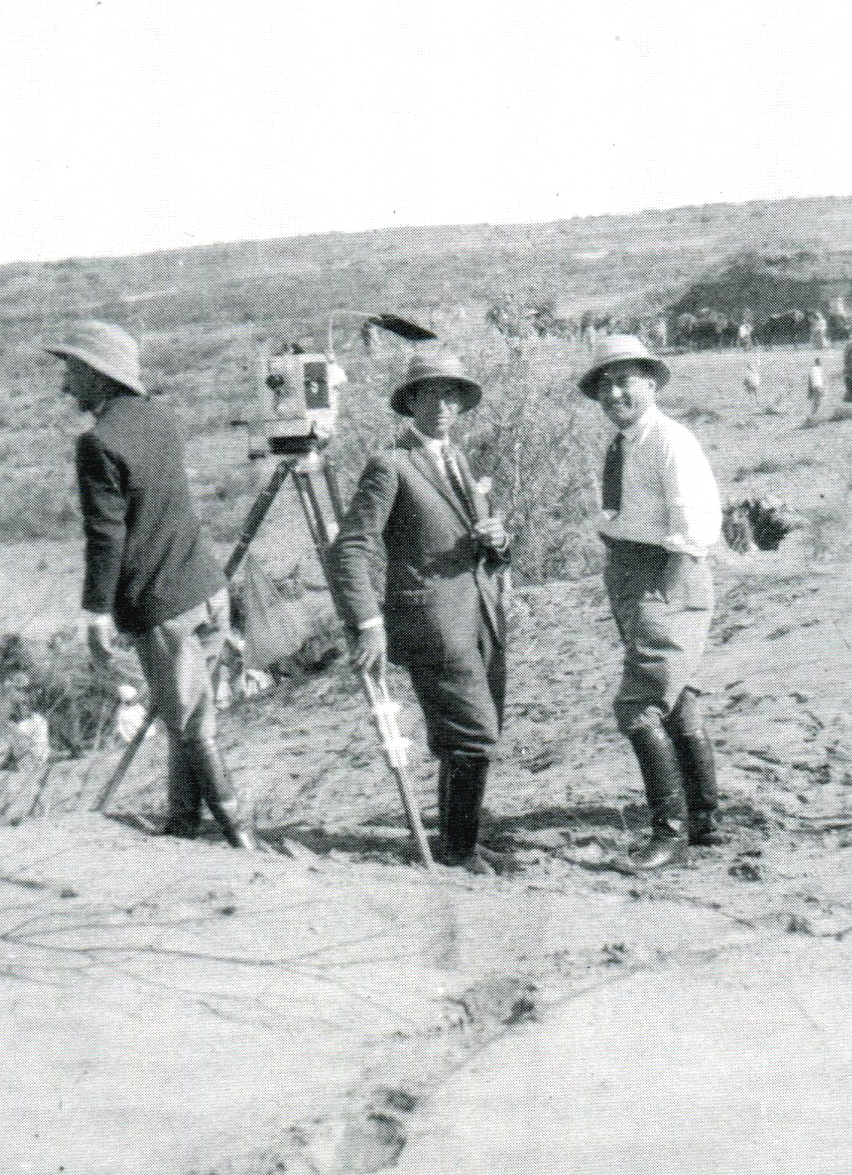
Camerini (right) shooting the film on location in the Libyan Desert.

The film promoted the Italian Fascist regime's imperial policies in Libya and in wider Africa. While privately funded (although the government supported its production) the film foreshadowed future collaborations between the film industry and the Italian state.

== Cast ==
- Donatella Neri as Mne
- Carlo Benetti
- Piero Carnabuci as Mabruk El Gadi
- Nini Dinelli as Rasim Ben Abdalla
- Ugo Gracci as Taleb
- Paolo Orsini
- Alberto Pasquali as Uff. Degli Zaptie
- Enrico Scatizzi as Comandante Turchi
- Marcello Spada as Ismail
- Raimondo Van Riel
- Gino Viotti as Ajad Padre Di Ismail
- Renato Visca as Fratello Ismail

== Bibliography ==
- Ben-Ghiat, Ruth. Fascist Modernities: Italy, 1922-1945. University of California Press, 2004.
- Del Boca, Angelo. Mohamed Fekini and the Fight to Free Libya. Palgrave Macmillan, 2011.
