= Aldo Vergano =

Italian film director, screenwriter and journalist

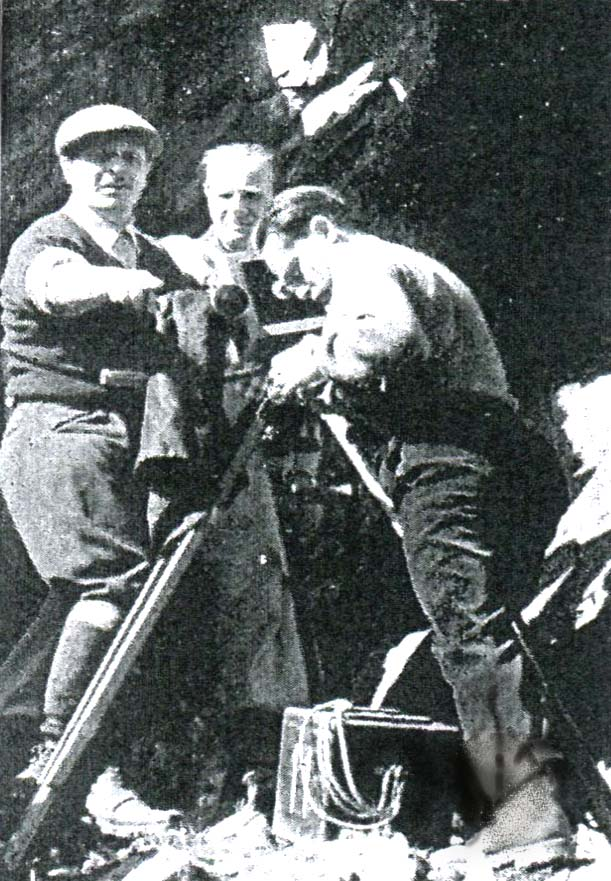
- Born: 27 August 1891; Rome
- Died: 21 September 1957 (aged 66); Rome
- Occupations: film director, screenwriter
- Children: Serena Vergano

Aldo Vergano (1891–1957) was an Italian director, screenwriter and journalist. He was the father of actress Serena Vergano.

== Biography ==
Born in Rome, Vergano was the co-founder with Alessandro Blasetti of the magazine Cinematografo.

He made his film debut with the screenplay of Blasetti's Sun, one of the most important films of the Italian silent cinema. In the thirties, though persecuted by fascism for his political views, he was a prolific screenwriter of Telefoni Bianchi films. He made his debut as a director with the patriotic drama Pietro Micca.

Vergano is probably best known for the film The Sun Still Rises, produced by the PNA, (the National Association of Italian Partisans), which is considered "one of the cornerstones of neorealism".

== Selected filmography ==
Director

- Pietro Micca (1938)
- Men of the Mountain (1943)
- The Sun Still Rises (1946)
- Czarci żleb (1949)
- The Outlaws (1950)
- La grande rinuncia (1951)
- Red Love (1952)
- Schicksal am Lenkrad (1954)

Screenwriter

- Lowered Sails (1931)
- The Man with the Claw (1931)
- The Opera Singer (1932)
- The Telephone Operator (1932)
- The Blue Fleet (1932)
- Don Bosco (1935)
- Cavalry (1936)
- Adam's Tree (1936)
- The Carnival Is Here Again (1937)
- Marcella (1937)
- The Count of Brechard (1938)
- For Men Only (1938)
- The Night of Tricks (1939)
- The Cavalier from Kruja (1940)
- Saint John, the Beheaded (1940)
- Lost in the Dark (1947)
