= The Phantom Musketeer =

1952 film

- Directed by: Max Calandri
- Written by: Max Calandri; Gian Maria Cominetti; Piero Monfisani
- Produced by: Ferruccio Biancini
- Starring: Vasito Bastino; Tamara Lees; Rossana Podestà; Clara Calamai
- Cinematography: Fernando Risi
- Edited by: Max Calandri
- Music by: Bruno Maderna
- Production company: Lloyd Film
- Distributed by: Atlantis Film
- Release date: 8 March 1952
- Running time: 85 minutes
- Country: Italy
- Language: Italian

The Phantom Musketeer (Italian: Il Moschettiere fantasma) is a 1952 Italian historical adventure film directed by Max Calandri and starring Vasito Bastino, Tamara Lees, Rossana Podestà and Clara Calamai. The film's sets were designed by the art director Nino Maccarones.

== Cast ==
- Vasito Bastino as Claudio Venier
- Tamara Lees as Sibilla
- Rossana Podestà as Ornella
- Clara Calamai as Marina Venier
- Elio Steiner as inquisitore Badoero
- Isa Pola as contessa Ferrer
- Gianni Rizzo as Pierre de La Tour
- Carlo Ninchi as doge Donato
- Inge Borg as suor Angelica

== Bibliography ==
- Chiti, Roberto & Poppi, Roberto. Dizionario del cinema italiano: Dal 1945 al 1959. Gremese Editore, 1991.
- Dalmonte, Rossana & Baroni, Mario. Bruno Maderna: His Life and Music. Rowman & Littlefield, 2022.
