= Gino Viotti =

Italian actor

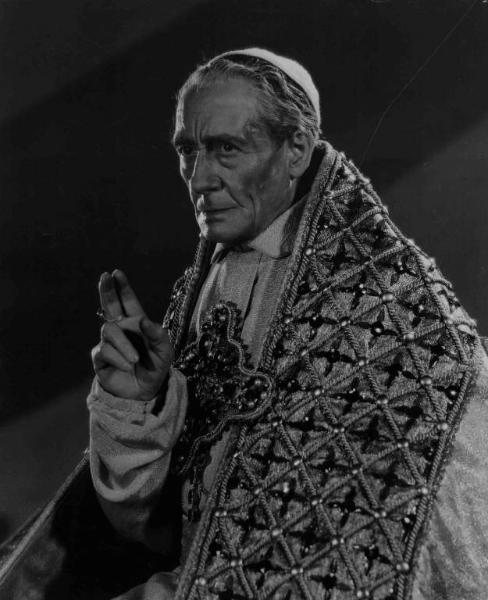
- Viotti in 1937
- Born: 1875; Turin, Piedmont; Italy
- Died: 14 December 1951 (aged 75-76); Rome, Lazio; Italy
- Other name: Luigi Viotti
- Occupation: Actor
- Years active: 1920 - 1944 (film)

Gino Viotti (1875–1951) was an Italian film actor who appeared in more than forty films, mostly in supporting roles. He played the part of Chilone Chilonides in the 1924 epic Quo Vadis.

== Selected filmography ==
- Nemesis (1920)
- The Youth of the Devil (1921)
- The Nude Woman (1922)
- Quo Vadis (1924)
- Kif Tebbi (1928)
- The Man with the Claw (1931)
- Figaro and His Great Day (1931)
- Palio (1932)
- Two Happy Hearts (1932)
- The Opera Singer (1932)
- Paradise (1932)
- My Little One (1933)
- Tourist Train (1933)
- Seconda B (1934)
- Just Married (1934)
- The Old Guard (1934)
- The Joker King (1935)
- King of Diamonds (1936)
- Bayonet (1936)
- A Woman Between Two Worlds (1936)
- The Former Mattia Pascal (1937)
- Condottieri (1937)
- Pietro Micca (1938)
- Giuseppe Verdi (1938)
- The Dream of Butterfly (1939)
- The Children Are Watching Us (1944)

== Bibliography ==
- Wyke, Maria. Projecting the Past: Ancient Rome, Cinema and History. Routledge, 2013.
