= Sergio Amidei =

Italian screenwriter

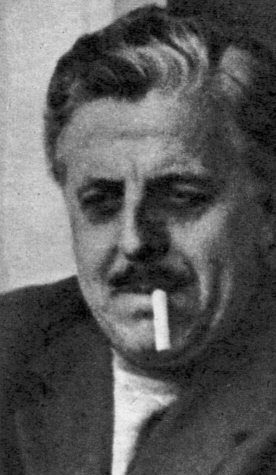
- Amidei in 1955
- Born: 30 October 1904; Trieste, Italy
- Died: 14 April 1981 (aged 76); Rome, Italy
- Occupation: Screenwriter
- Years active: 1936–1981

Sergio Amidei (30 October 1904 – 14 April 1981) was an Italian screenwriter and an important figure in Italy's neorealist movement.

Amidei was born in Trieste. He worked with famed Italian directors such as Roberto Rossellini and Vittorio De Sica. He was nominated for four Academy Awards: in 1946 for Rome, Open City, in 1947 for Shoeshine, in 1949 for Paisà and in 1961 for Il generale della Rovere. In 1963 he was a member of the jury at the 3rd Moscow International Film Festival. In 1975 he was a member of the jury at the 9th Moscow International Film Festival. The city of Gorizia has established an international recognition dedicated to him, which rewards the best film screenwriters annually.

He died in Rome.

== Biography ==
He began his career as a film writer by adapting the lives of historical figures in films such as Pietro Micca or Don Bosco (1935 film) in the period immediately before the outbreak of World War II.

In the Post-war period, the advent of the neorealist movement brought him closer to the likes of Roberto Rossellini and Vittorio De Sica, with whom he collaborated on the screenplays of some of the major works of the period, from Rome, Open City to Sciuscià. He also worked in parallel as a producer and production manager; in 1949 he founded the film production company Colonna Film in Rome.

Nominated four times for an Academy Award, he was awarded two David di Donatello and two Nastro d'Argento. The city of Gorizia has established the Sergio Amidei Prize, an international award dedicated to him, which honors the best screenwriters on the world film scene.

He was romantically linked, for a time, to actress Maria Michi. He died on April 14, 1981, in Rome. He is buried at the Campo Verano.

== Selected filmography ==
- Don Bosco (1935)
- Pietro Micca (1938)
- The Count of Brechard (1938)
- Battles in the Shadow (1938)
- The Night of Tricks (1939)
- Then We'll Get a Divorce (1940)
- The Prisoner of Santa Cruz (1941)
- The Last Dance (1941)
- Jealousy (1942)
- The Taming of the Shrew (1942)
- Don Cesare di Bazan (1942)
- The Queen of Navarre (1942)
- Farewell Love! (1943)
- I'll Always Love You (1943)
- Harlem (1943)
- The Son of the Red Corsair (1943)
- Sad Loves (1943)
- The Priest's Hat (1944)
- Crime News (1947)
- The Other (1947)
- Pact with the Devil (1950)
- Paris Is Always Paris (1951)
- The Machine That Kills Bad People (1952)
- The President of Borgorosso Football Club (1970)
