= Courtyard (film) =

1931 film directed by Carlo Campogalliani

- Directed by: Carlo Campogalliani
- Written by: Fausto Maria Martini (play); Ettore Petrolini
- Starring: Augusto Contardi; Dria Paola; Ettore Petrolini
- Cinematography: Ubaldo Arata; Massimo Terzano
- Edited by: Mario Almirante
- Music by: Pietro Sassoli
- Production company: Società Italiana Cines
- Distributed by: Societa Anonima Stefano Pittaluga
- Release date: February 1931
- Running time: 25 minutes
- Country: Italy
- Language: Italian

Courtyard (Italian: Cortile) is a 1931 Italian drama film directed by Carlo Campogalliani and starring Augusto Contardi, Dria Paola and Ettore Petrolini. It was the director's first sound film, and was made after he returned from working in South America for several years.

It was made at the Cines Studios in Rome.

== Cast ==
- Augusto Contardi as No name
- Dria Paola as Maria
- Ettore Petrolini as Il cantante girovago cieco

== Bibliography ==
- Moliterno, Gino. The A to Z of Italian Cinema. Scarecrow Press, 2009.
