= Bridge of Glass (film) =

1940 film

- Directed by: Goffredo Alessandrini
- Written by: Gerardo De Angelis; Piero Ballerini
- Starring: Isa Pola; Rossano Brazzi; Filippo Scelzo; Regina Bianchi
- Cinematography: Ubaldo Arata
- Edited by: Mario Bonotti; Eraldo Da Roma
- Music by: Edgardo Carducci
- Production company: Scalera Film
- Distributed by: Scalera Film
- Release date: 16 February 1940
- Running time: 85 minutes
- Country: Italy
- Language: Italian

Bridge of Glass (Italian: Il ponte di vetro) is a 1940 Italian drama film directed by Goffredo Alessandrini and starring Isa Pola, Rossano Brazzi and Filippo Scelzo. It was shot at the Scalera Studios in Rome.

== Cast ==
- Isa Pola as Luciana Dorelli
- Rossano Brazzias comandante Mario Marchi
- Filippo Scelzo as dottor Paolo Dorelli
- Regina Bianchi as Anna
- Carlo Romano as Leone
- Adriano Rimoldi
- Renato Chiantoni
- Fedele Gentile
- Walter Grant
- Mario Lodolini
- Felice Romano

== Bibliography ==
- Savio, Francesco. Ma l'amore no. Sonzogno, 1975.
