= Massimo Terzano =

Italian film director

- Born: 23 April 1892; Turin, Piedmont, Italy
- Died: 18 October 1947 (aged 55); Rome, Lazio, Italy
- Occupation: Cinematographer
- Years active: 1913 - 1947

Massimo Terzano (23 April 1892 – 18 October 1947) was an Italian cinematographer. Terzano was a leading figure in the Italian film industry, working on over eighty films during the silent, Fascist and post-war eras. His final film was The Barber of Seville, made shortly before his death.

== Selected filmography ==
- Emperor Maciste (1924)
- Saetta Learns to Live (1924)
- Maciste in the Lion's Cage (1926)
- The Giant of the Dolomites (1927)
- The Carnival of Venice (1928)
- Judith and Holofernes (1929)
- The Song of Love (1930)
- When Naples Sings (1930)
- Figaro and His Great Day (1931)
- Lowered Sails (1931)
- Before the Jury (1931)
- Courtyard (1931)
- The Private Secretary (1931)
- What Scoundrels Men Are! (1932)
- The Opera Singer (1932)
- Steel (1933)
- Giallo (1933)
- Fanny (1933)
- Ragazzo (1934)
- Stadium (1934)
- Casta Diva (1935)
- Aldebaran (1935)
- Like the Leaves (1935)
- Those Two (1935)
- The White Squadron (1936)
- But It's Nothing Serious (1936)
- Joe the Red (1936)
- The Great Appeal (1936)
- The Anonymous Roylott (1936)
- The Carnival Is Here Again (1937)
- Mother Song (1937)
- I've Lost My Husband! (1937)
- Doctor Antonio (1937)
- Princess Tarakanova (1938)
- Giuseppe Verdi (1938)
- The Sons of the Marquis Lucera (1939)
- The Silent Partner (1939)
- Our Miss Doctor (1940)
- Boccaccio (1940)
- Captain Tempest (1942)
- Tragic Night (1942)
- The Lion of Damascus (1942)
- Malombra (1942)
- A Pistol Shot (1942)
- Zaza (1944)
- Two Anonymous Letters (1945)
- Days of Glory (1945)
- The Barber of Seville (1947)
- Crime News (1947)

== Bibliography ==
- Moliterno, Gino. The A to Z of Italian Cinema. Scarecrow Press, 2009.
