= Pietro Micca (film) =

- Directed by: Aldo Vergano
- Written by: Luigi Gramegna (novel); Ettore Maria Margadonna; Sergio Amidei; Ubaldo Magnaghi; Aldo Vergano
- Produced by: Luigi Mottura
- Starring: Guido Celano; Renato Cialente; Camillo Pilotto; Mino Doro
- Cinematography: Ugo Lombardi
- Edited by: Guy Simon
- Music by: Giorgio Federico Ghedini
- Production company: Taurinia Film
- Distributed by: CINF
- Release date: January 1938
- Running time: 90 minutes
- Country: Italy
- Language: Italian

Pietro Micca is a 1938 Italian historical war film directed by Aldo Vergano and starring Guido Celano, Renato Cialente and Camillo Pilotto. It was shot at the Fert Studios in Turin. The film marked the screen debut of Clara Calamai, who went on to be a leading Italian star of the next decade.

The film portrays the life and death of Pietro Micca who was killed in 1706 at the Siege of Turin while fighting for Savoy against France in the War of the Spanish Succession.

== Cast ==
Max Mayer as Tomasino di Carignano
- Lina Tartara Minora as L'ostessa
- Carlo Gazzabini as Il duca di Marignano
- Gino Viotti as Bertola
- Armando Annuale as Don Sebastiano Valfré
- Corrado Torrigiani as Amé di Savoia
- Gino Morosini as Carlino di Savoia
- Alfredo Robert as Il generale Virico Daun
- Umberto Casilini as Solaro della Margherita
- Nicola Melnikoff as Il principe di Anhalt
- Alfredo Dolfini as Don Valente
- Mario Corte as Monsù Battista
- Giorgio Jaccarino as Monsù Fabrizio
- Carlo Artuffo as Un minator della 'Compagnia delle talpe'
- Virgilio Botti as Un minator della 'Compagnia delle talpe'
- Enrico Marroni as Un minator della 'Compagnia delle talpe'
- Ugo Sasso as Un minator della 'Compagnia delle talpe'
- Mauro Serra as Un minator della 'Compagnia delle talpe'

== Bibliography ==
- Moliterno, Gino. Historical Dictionary of Italian Cinema. Scarecrow Press, 2008.
