= Evelina Paoli =

Italian stage and film actress

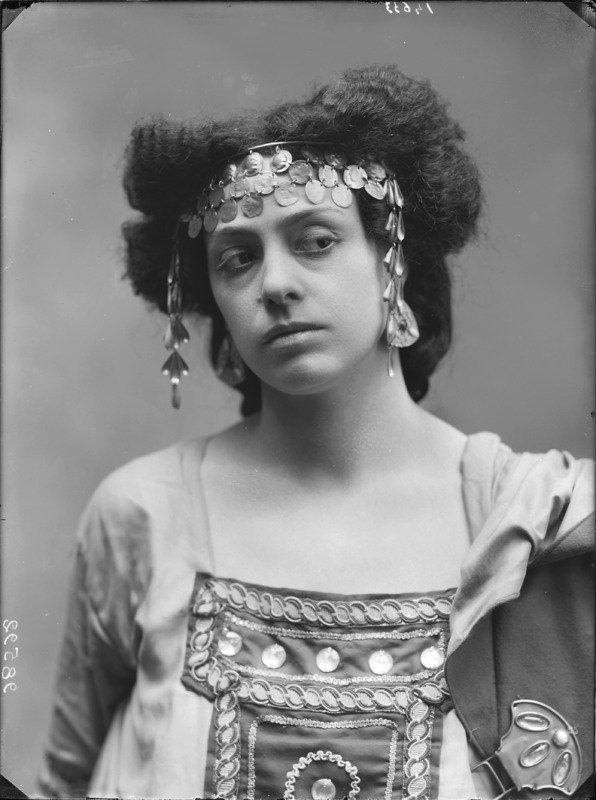
- Born: 30 March 1878; Florence, Tuscany, Italy
- Died: 28 December 1972 (aged 94); Bologna, Emilia-Romagna, Italy
- Occupation: Actress
- Years active: 1915–1948 (film)

Evelina Paoli (1878–1972) was an Italian stage and film actress.

== Selected filmography ==
- Venus (1932)
- One Night with You (1932)
- The Joker King (1935)
- They've Kidnapped a Man (1938)
- Dora Nelson (1939)
- Idyll in Budapest (1941)
- A Garibaldian in the Convent (1942)
- We the Living (1942)
- Farewell Love! (1943)
- L'abito nero da sposa (1945)
- Baron Carlo Mazza (1948)
- The Charterhouse of Parma (1948)

== Bibliography ==
- Goble, Alan. The Complete Index to Literary Sources in Film. Walter de Gruyter, 1999.
