= Carlo Campogalliani =

Italian screenwriter, actor, and director (1885–1974)

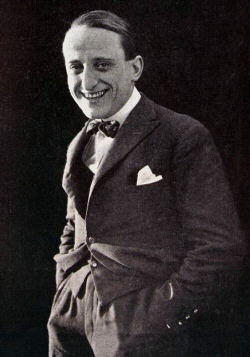
- Born: 10 October 1885; Concordia sulla Secchia, Emilia-Romagna; Italy
- Died: 10 August 1974 (aged 88); Rome, Lazio; Italy
- Occupations: Director; Screenwriter; Actor
- Years active: 1910–1964

Carlo Campogalliani (10 October 1885 – 10 August 1974) was an Italian screenwriter, actor and film director. Campogalliani directed around eighty films during his career and acted in another fifty. He directed the 1934 sports film Stadio and the 1940 Fascist propaganda film The Cavalier from Kruja. He was married to the actress Letizia Quaranta who appeared in several of his films.

== Selected directorial filmography ==
- The Woman at Midnight (1925)
- I Lost My Heart on a Bus (1929)
- Courtyard (1931)
- The Devil's Lantern (1931)
- The Doctor in Spite of Himself (1931)
- Stadium (1934)
- The Four Musketeers (1936)
- The Night of Tricks (1939)
- The Cavalier from Kruja (1940)
- The Hero of Venice (1941)
- Forbidden Music (1942)
- The Innocent Casimiro (1945)
- The Devil's Gondola (1946)
- Hand of Death (1949)
- The Beggar's Daughter (1950)
- Beauties on Bicycles (1951)
- Beauties on Motor Scooters (1952)
- Orphan of the Ghetto (1954)
- The Song of the Heart (1955)
- The Angel of the Alps (1957)
- Captain Falcon (1958)
- Goliath and the Barbarians (1959)
- Fountain of Trevi (1960)
- Ursus (1961)
- Sword of the Conqueror (1961)
- The Avenger of Venice (1964)

== Bibliography ==
- Reich, Jacqueline & Garofalo, Piero. Re-viewing Fascism: Italian Cinema, 1922-1943. Indiana University Press, 2002.
