= Venus (1932 film) =

1932 film

- Directed by: Nicola Fausto Neroni
- Starring: Ellen Meis; Maurizio D'Ancora; Evelina Paoli
- Music by: Costantino Ferri
- Production company: Titanus
- Distributed by: Titanus Distribuzione
- Release date: 1932
- Country: Italy
- Language: Italian

Venus (Italian: Venere) is a 1932 Italian film directed by Nicola Fausto Neroni and starring Ellen Meis, Maurizio D'Ancora and Evelina Paoli.

== Cast ==
- Ellen Meis as La diva del varietà
- Maurizio D'Ancora as Il giovane Italo-Americano
- Evelina Paoli as Sua madre
- Giorgio Bianchi as L'amante della diva
- Rossana D'Alba
- Olga Capri
- Oreste Fares
- Tina Ceccaci Renaldi
- Alfredo Del Pelo as Il chitarrista
