= L'Armata Azzurra =

1932 film

- Theatrical release poster
- Directed by: Gennaro Righelli
- Written by: Aldo Vergano; Tomaso Smith
- Produced by: Giulio Lombardozzi
- Starring: Alfredo Moretti; Germana Paolieri; Ennio Cerlesi; Leda Gloria
- Cinematography: Carlo Montuori; Domenico Scala
- Edited by: Ferdinando Maria Poggioli; Giorgio Simonelli
- Music by: Felice Montagnini
- Production company: Società Italiana Cines
- Distributed by: Società Italiana Cines
- Release date: 1932
- Running time: 85 minutes
- Country: Italy
- Language: Italian

L'Armata Azzurra (English: The Blue Army or The Blue Fleet AKA The Winged Armada and Italy Speaks) is a 1932 Italian aviation docu-drama and adventure film directed by Gennaro Righelli and starring Germana Paolieri and Ennio Cerlesi. It was Italy's first aviation drama film, with a fictional story that celebrated the Italian Air Force. (Note: Atlantic Flight (1931 film) documentary film could be considered the first Italian aviation film.)

== Plot ==
Commander Mario Spada (Alfredo Moretti) and Carlo Banti Ennio Cerlesi are pilots and best friends in the Regia Aeronautica Italiana (Italian Air Force). The air armadas that are flying on military exercises show off the air power of Italy.

The two friends find that their minds are not on flying, they have something that comes between them – a woman. Spada's sister, Elena (Germana Paolieri) is being pursued by Banti. Spada sees his friend as a womanizer and does not like the advances being made on his sister.

Banti attempts an altitude record in an aircraft prepared by Spada. When he crashes in the mountains, Spada doesn't hesitate in flying to his friend's rescue. Spada, motivated by his sister's anguish, and releasing she loves Banti, manages to bring him back to the base where he is warmly greeted by Elena.

== Cast ==
- Alfredo Moretti as Comandante Mario Spada
- Germana Paolieri as Elena, sua sorella
- Ennio Cerlesi as fidanzato di Elena as Carlo Banti
- Leda Gloria as Olga Rosati
- Guido Celano as Tenente (Lieutenant) Castelli
- Giacomo Moschini as the orderly

== Production ==
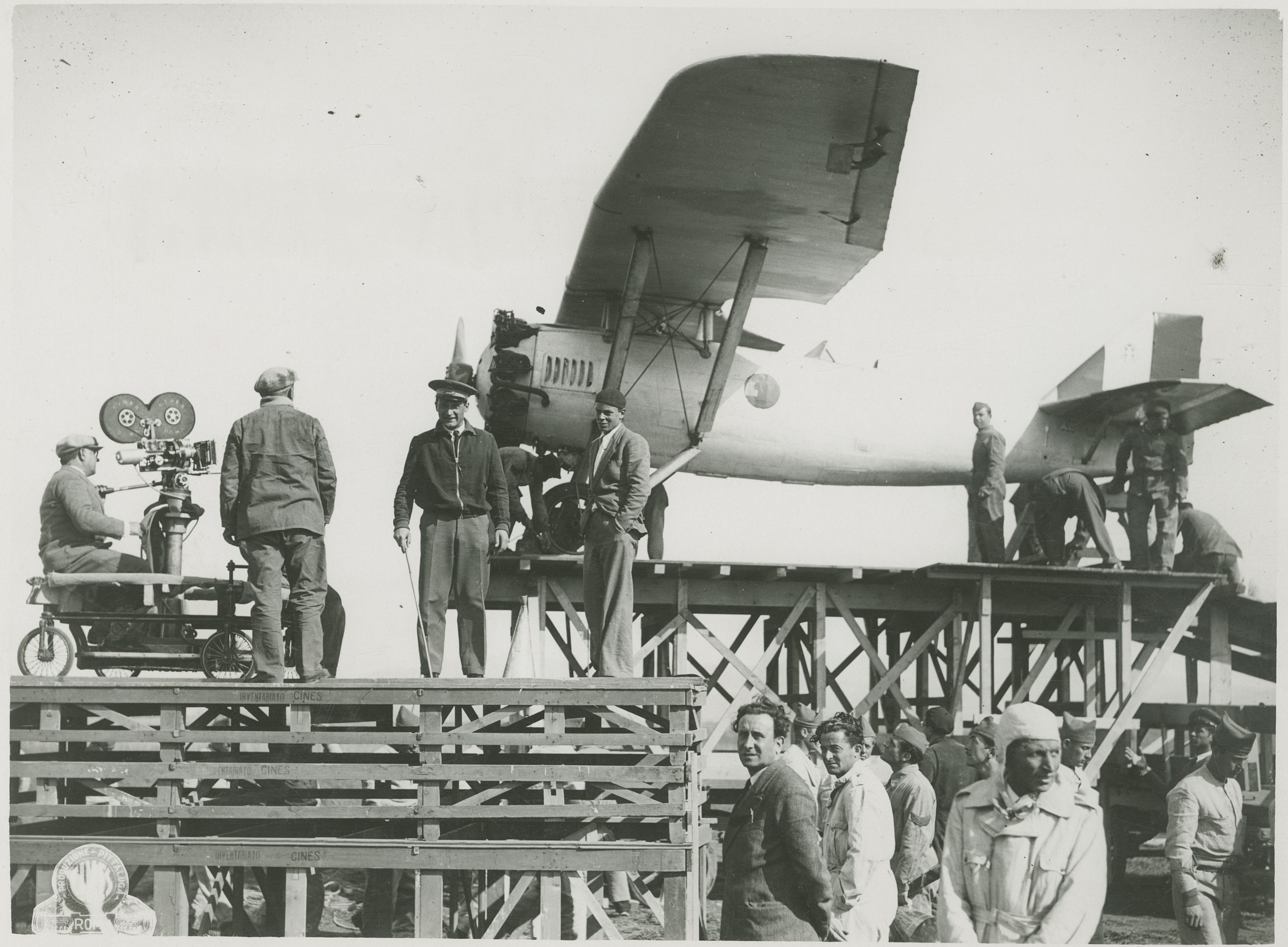
Preparation and filming in Centocelle Airport

L'Armata Azzurra is a propaganda effort, with obvious deference to the Fascist government of Italy. "Most of the aerial sequences were shot during the 1931 army manoeuvres and involved vast formations of aircraft. However, somewhat artificially, a narrative theme was introduced involving the friendship of two young pilots, a daring rescue and other melodramatic incidents." Upon completion, the production was released in 1932 although some sources have a 1935 release date.

== Reception ==
Aviation film historian Stephen Pendo in Aviation in the Cinema (1985) in his evaluation of the film, referred to the review from The New York Times, "... a motion picture record of Italy's 1932 naval and airplane manoeuvres followed by a series of Sicilian folk songs and dances ..." Aviation film historian Michael Paris in From the Wright Brothers to Top Gun: Aviation, Nationalism, and Popular Cinema (1995) considered "the expensive and prestigious production was made to promote Italian Air power."
