= The Song of Love (1930 film) =

1930 film

- Directed by: Gennaro Righelli
- Written by: Giorgio Simonelli; Gennaro Righelli
- Produced by: Stefano Pittaluga for CINES
- Starring: Dria Paola; Isa Pola; Elio Steiner; Mercedes Brignone
- Cinematography: Ubaldo Arata; Massimo Terzano
- Edited by: Leo Menardi; Gennaro Righelli
- Music by: Cesare Andrea Bixio
- Distributed by: Pitaluga
- Release date: 7 October 1930 (Italy)
- Running time: 94 minutes
- Country: Italy
- Language: Italian

The Song of Love (Italian: La canzone dell'amore) is a 1930 Italian romance film directed by Gennaro Righelli and starring Dria Paola, Isa Pola and Elio Steiner. It was the first Italian talking film. Alessandro Blasetti's film Resurrection was actually shot first, but delays meant that it was not released until 1931.

The film was first publicly screened on 7 October 1930 at the Supercinema in Rome. The story was based on a short story by Luigi Pirandello, In Silenzio.

The film was shot at the Cines-Pittaluga studios in Rome in three different versions: Italian, French and German using different casts and directors.

== Cast ==
- Dria Paola as Lucia
- Isa Pola as Anna
- Elio Steiner as Enrico
- Mercedes Brignone as La governante
- Camillo Pilotto as Alberto Giordani, il padre
- Olga Capri as La padrona di casa
- Nello Rocchi as Marietto detto 'Ninì'
- Umberto Sacripante as Amico di Enrico
- Geni Sadero as La dirimpettaia
- Franz Sala
- Ermete Tamberlani
- Renato Malavasi
- Gino Mercuriali

== Bibliography ==
- Moliterno, Gino (2008). Historical Dictionary of Italian Cinema. Lanham, Maryland: Scarecrow Press.
