= Giorgio Simonelli =

Italian film director and film editor (1901–1966)

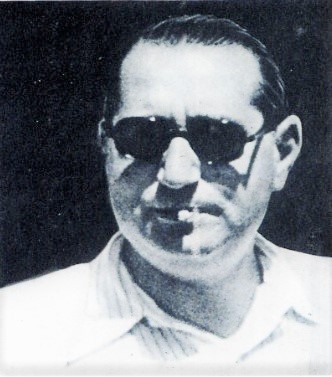
- Born: 14 November 1901; Rome, Italy
- Died: 3 October 1966 (aged 64); Rome, Italy
- Occupations: Director, screenwriter

Giorgio Simonelli (14 November 1901 – 3 October 1966), was an Italian film director, editor, screenwriter and journalist.

== Life and career ==
Born in Rome, Simonelli got a high school diploma in business studies, and then started working as a journalist and as a film critic for the weekly magazines Avvenimento and Gente nostra. In 1928, at 22, he made his directorial debut co-directing with Nicola Fausto Neroni Maratona, and two years later he was among the screenwriters of the first Italian talking film, The Song of Love by Gennaro Righelli. From 1934 Simonelli mainly devoted himself to film editing, then, from 1940, he resumed his activity as a director specialising in commercially successful comedy films, in which he directed some of the most popular actors of the period, notably Totò, Eduardo and Peppino De Filippo, Nino Taranto, Renato Rascel, Walter Chiari, Ugo Tognazzi, Macario, Alberto Sordi and Aldo Fabrizi. He ended his career by filming many successful works interpreted by the comedy duo Franco and Ciccio. His last film was the western-parody Two Sons of Ringo, in which shortly before the end of filming he was replaced by Giuliano Carnimeo for health reasons.

== Selected filmography ==
=== Director ===
- The Cuckoo Clock (1938)
- A Husband for the Month of April (1941)
- The Two Tigers (1941)
- Two Hearts Among the Beasts (1943)
- Eleven Men and a Ball (1948)
- The Transporter (1950)
- I'm the Capataz (1951)
- Auguri e figli maschi! (1951)
- La paura fa 90 (1951)
- I, Hamlet (1952)
- Passionate Song (1953)
- Saluti e baci (1953)
- Love Song (1954)
- It Happened at the Police Station (1954)
- Noi siamo due evasi (1959)
- Robin Hood and the Pirates (1960)
- Ursus in the Land of Fire (1961)
- I due mafiosi (1964)
- Two Mafiamen in the Far West (1964)
- Two Mafiosi Against Goldfinger (1965)
- Two Sergeants of General Custer (1965)
- I due toreri (1965)
- Two Sons of Ringo (1966)

=== Screenwriter ===
- The Song of Love (1930)
- Fountain of Trevi (1960)
- The Hot Port of Hong Kong (1962)

=== Film editor ===
- The Blue Fleet (1932)
- Paradise (1932)
- La Wally (1932)
- Seconda B (1934)
- Loyalty of Love (1934)
- Don Bosco (1935)
- Golden Arrow (1935)
- Cavalry (1936)
- Queen of the Scala (1937)
- Mother Song (1937)
- Luciano Serra, Pilot (1938)
- Battles in the Shadow (1938)
- The Widow (1939)
- Cardinal Messias (1939)
- No Man's Land (1939)
- A Thousand Lire a Month (1939)
- The Thrill of the Skies (1940)
- A Husband for the Month of April (1941)
