= The Gift of the Morning =

1932 film

- Directed by: Enrico Guazzoni
- Written by: Giovacchino Forzano
- Starring: Germana Paolieri; Carlo Lombardi; Arturo Falconi
- Cinematography: Giovanni Vitrotti
- Edited by: Enrico Guazzoni
- Music by: Umberto Mancini
- Production company: Caesar Film
- Distributed by: Caesar Film
- Release date: 1932
- Running time: 76 minutes
- Country: Italy
- Language: Italian

The Gift of the Morning (Italian: Il dono del mattino) is a 1932 Italian comedy film directed by Enrico Guazzoni and starring Germana Paolieri, Carlo Lombardi and Arturo Falconi. It was based on a play by Giovacchino Forzano. It was made by Caesar Film at the company's Rome studios.

== Cast ==
- Germana Paolieri as Lucia Bianchi
- Carlo Lombardi as Conte Carlo de Flavis
- Arturo Falconi as Il maestro
- Olga Capri as La signora Ersilia
- Vasco Creti as L'ufficiale postale
- Oreste Bilancia as Annibale
- Claudio Ermelli as Cavaliere Castelli
- Carlo Simoneschi as Il pievano
- Giuseppe Pierozzi as Il vedovo
- Gina Cinquini as La domestica
- Cesare Zoppetti
- Cesarina Gheraldi
- Carlo Chertier
- Giovanni Ferrari
- Umberto Sacripante

== Bibliography ==
- Goble, Alan. The Complete Index to Literary Sources in Film. Walter de Gruyter, 1999.
