= Olga Capri =

Italian actress (1883–1961)

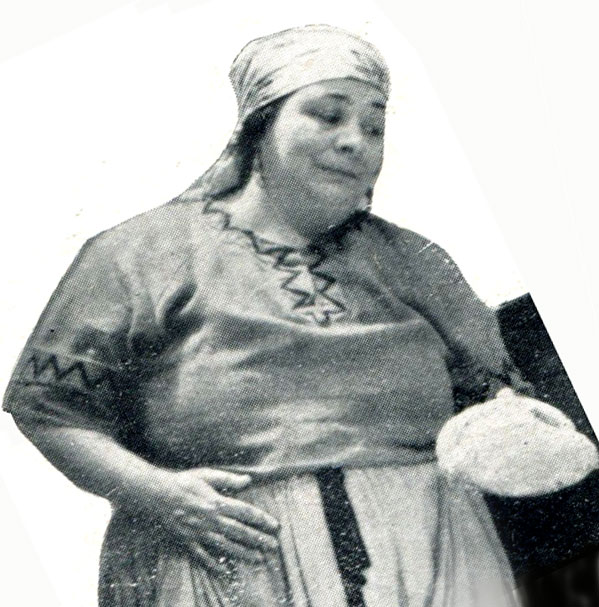
- Born: 18 May 1883; Rome, Kingdom of Italy
- Died: 18 December 1961 (aged 68); Bologna, Italy
- Occupation: Actress
- Years active: 1914–1947 (film)

Olga Capri (18 May 1883 – 18 December 1961) was a stage and film actress from Italy. She appeared in more than 40 films during her career, generally in supporting roles. She appeared in several of Alessandro Blasetti's early sound films, such as Mother Earth (1931).

== Selected filmography ==
- The Betrothed (1923)
- The Song of Love (1930)
- Mother Earth (1931)
- Figaro and His Great Day (1931)
- Resurrection (1931)
- Palio (1932)
- Zaganella and the Cavalier (1932)
- The Gift of the Morning (1932)
- Venus (1932)
- Paradise (1932)
- Fanny (1933)
- Steel (1933)
- The Three Wishes (1937)
- The Castiglioni Brothers (1937)
- The Night of Tricks (1939)
- Before the Postman (1942)
- Nothing New Tonight (1942)
- The Peddler and the Lady (1943)
- Daniele Cortis (1947)
