= The Opera Singer =

1932 film directed by Nunzio Malasomma

- Directed by: Nunzio Malasomma
- Written by: Nunzio Malasomma; Gino Rocca (novel); Mario Soldati; Aldo Vergano
- Produced by: Luigi Eliseo Martini
- Starring: Gianfranco Giachetti; Germana Paolieri; Isa Pola
- Cinematography: Domenico Scala; Massimo Terzano
- Edited by: Nunzio Malasomma
- Music by: Enrico Giachetti; Pietro Sassoli
- Production company: Società Italiana Cines
- Release date: 1932
- Running time: 90 minutes
- Country: Italy
- Language: Italian

The Opera Singer (Italian: La cantante dell'opera) is a 1932 Italian musical film directed by Nunzio Malasomma and starring Gianfranco Giachetti, Germana Paolieri and Isa Pola.

== Cast ==
- Gianfranco Giachetti as Papussa
- Germana Paolieri as Lina
- Isa Pola as Lisetta
- Alfredo Moretti as George
- Ugo Ceseri as Ravelli
- Gino Viotti as Singing Master
- Alfredo Martinelli
- Emilio Baldanello
- Cesira Vianello
- Giovanni Casati
- Giselda Gasperini
- Carmen Baird
- Gastone Ror
- Remo Brignardelli

== Bibliography ==
- Ricci, Steven. Cinema and Fascism: Italian Film and Society, 1922–1943. University of California Press, 2008.
