= Umberto Sacripante =

Italian actor

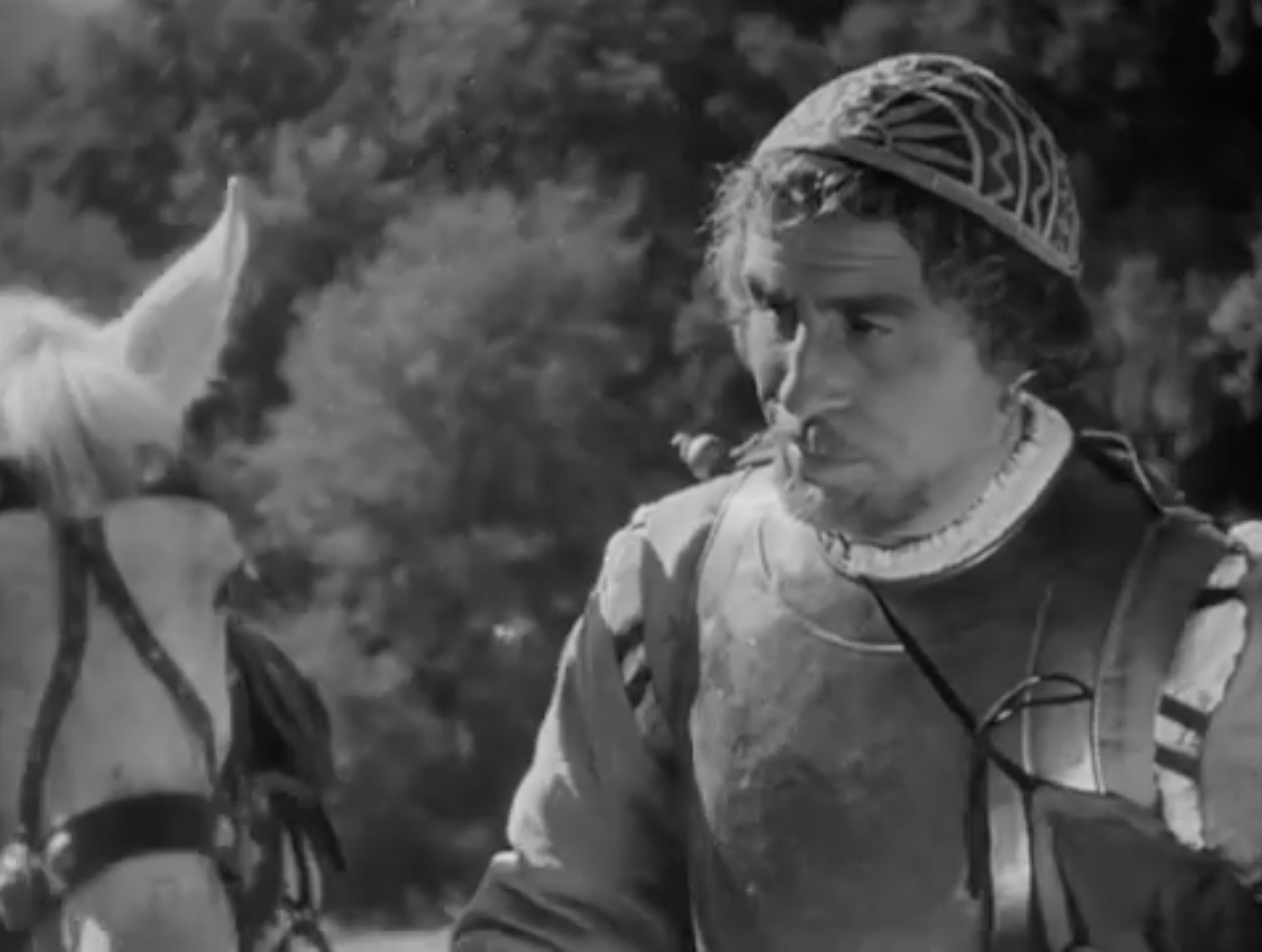
- Sacripante in Ettore Fieramosca (1938)
- Born: 2 October 1904; Rome, Italy
- Died: 14 January 1975 (aged 70); Rome, Italy
- Occupation: Actor

Umberto Sacripante (2 October 1904 – 14 January 1975) was an Italian film and stage actor.

== Life and career ==
Born Umberto Sacripanti in Rome, Sacripante debuted on stage in 1921, and in 1926 he became first actor in the theatrical company Teatro degli Indipendenti directed by Anton Giulio Bragaglia. He made his film debut in 1930, and in a short time he became one of the most active character actors of his time. Thanks to his good knowledge of German language, he was also often cast in German and Austrian productions. He also worked as general organizer for the production company Cines, and also was secretary of the National Syndicate of Film Actors.

=== Personal life ===
Sacripante was married to Assunta Lelli. Their sons Luciano and Mauro both worked in the cinema industry, respectively as film director and executive producer.

== Selected filmography ==
- Figaro and His Great Day (1931)
- Lowered Sails (1931)
- The Old Lady (1932)
- Five to Nil (1932)
- Zaganella and the Cavalier (1932)
- The Gift of the Morning (1932)
- Fanny (1933)
- Tourist Train (1933)
- Seconda B (1934)
- The Dance of Time (1936)
- Condottieri (1937)
- The Mountain Calls (1938)
- All of Life in One Night (1938)
- No Man's Land (1939)
- Department Store (1939)
- Red Tavern (1940)
- An Adventure of Salvator Rosa (1940)
- La zia smemorata (1940)
- The Little Teacher (1942)
- The Ways of Sin (1946)
- Tragic Hunt (1947)
- The Thief of Venice (1950)
- O.K. Nerone (1951)
- Guilt Is Not Mine (1952)
- The Mute of Portici (1952)
- Cavallina storna (1953)
- Peppino e la vecchia signora (1954)
- Escape to the Dolomites (1955)
- The Mysteries of Paris (1957)
- Robin Hood and the Pirates (1960)
