= Stefano Pittaluga =

Italian film producer

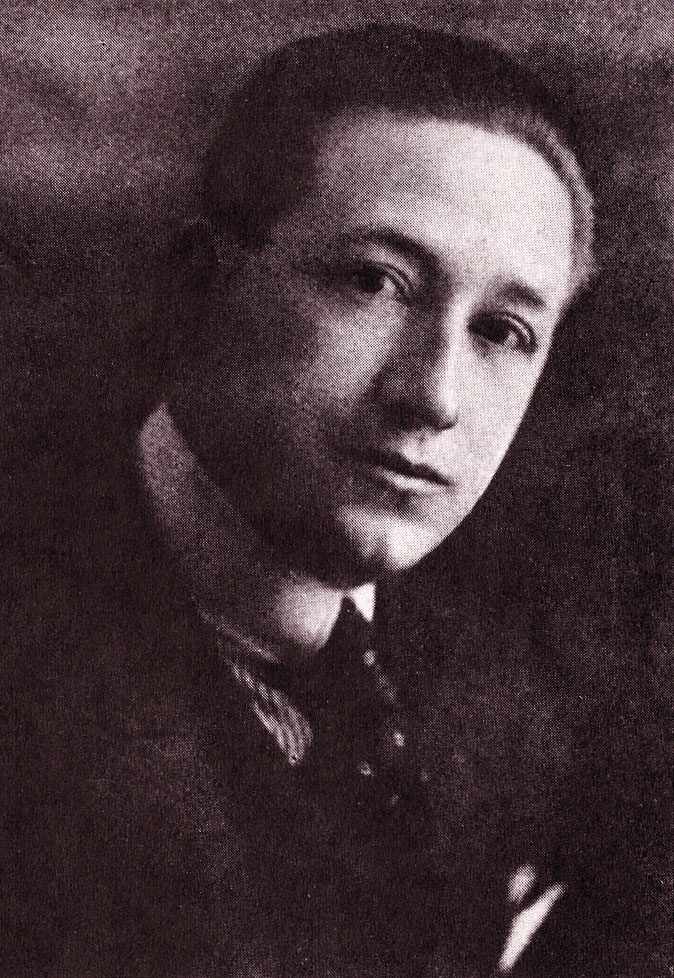
- Stefano Pittaluga
- Born: 2 February 1887; Genoa, Liguria; Italy
- Died: 26 April 1932 (aged 45); Rome, Lazio; Italy
- Occupation: Producer
- Years active: 1924−1932

Stefano Pittaluga (2 February 1887 – 26 April 1932) was an Italian film producer, one of several figures who helped revive Italian film production in the late 1920s and early 1930s.

== Biography ==
Originally a Genoa-based owner of cinemas, Pittaluga began to expand his business after 1924. He gained enormous power in the distribution sector by securing the rights to release the films of the Hollywood companies Warner Brothers, Universal Pictures and First National. Pittaluga also moved into the film production business around the same time, acquiring studios in Turin. Pittaluga was able to re-invest the profits he made from releasing foreign films into domestic production. He produced a series of films featuring pulp Strongman characters including Sansone and Saetta and particularly Maciste. The films led to him being the most commercially successful Italian producer of the era.

Pittaluga's power grew in 1926 when he acquired the traditional leading production outfit Cines from the conglomerate Unione Cinematografica Italiana. Following on the heels of the development of sound film in America, Britain and Germany, Pittaluga had the Cines Studios in Rome fitted for sound production. Cines produced the first Italian sound film The Song of Love (1930), although another of the company's films Resurrection (1931) was actually made earlier but released later. Cines became the dominant force of the early sound era.

Under Pittaluga the company specialised in releasing musicals and comedies. Much of the companies' output, often remakes of German or Hungarian films, were later branded "White Telephone" films. After Pittaluga's sudden death in 1932 the company continued to release the same kind of populist films, and were only overtaken when the Fascist government of Benito Mussolini invested large sums of money in production and constructed the vast Cinecittà complex in Rome.

== Bibliography ==
- Moliterno, Gino (2008). Historical Dictionary of Italian Cinema. Lanham, Maryland: Scarecrow Press. ISBN 978-0810862548.
- Ricci, Steven (2008). Cinema and Fascism: Italian Film and Society, 1922–1943. Berkeley: University of California Press. ISBN 978-0520253568.
