= Mario Almirante =

Italian film director

- Born: 18 February 1890; Molfetta, Italy
- Died: 30 September 1964 (aged 74); Rome, Italy
- Occupation(s): Film director Screenwriter
- Years active: 1920–1933

Mario Almirante (18 February 1890 – 30 September 1964) was an Italian film director and screenwriter active between 1920 and 1933. His 1927 film La bellezza del mondo featured an early appearance of Vittorio De Sica. He was the father of fascist politician Giorgio Almirante.

== Selected filmography ==
- Zingari (1920)
- La bellezza del mondo (1927)
- The Carnival of Venice (1928)
- Courtyard (1931)
- Fanny (1933)
