= Isa Pola =

Italian actress

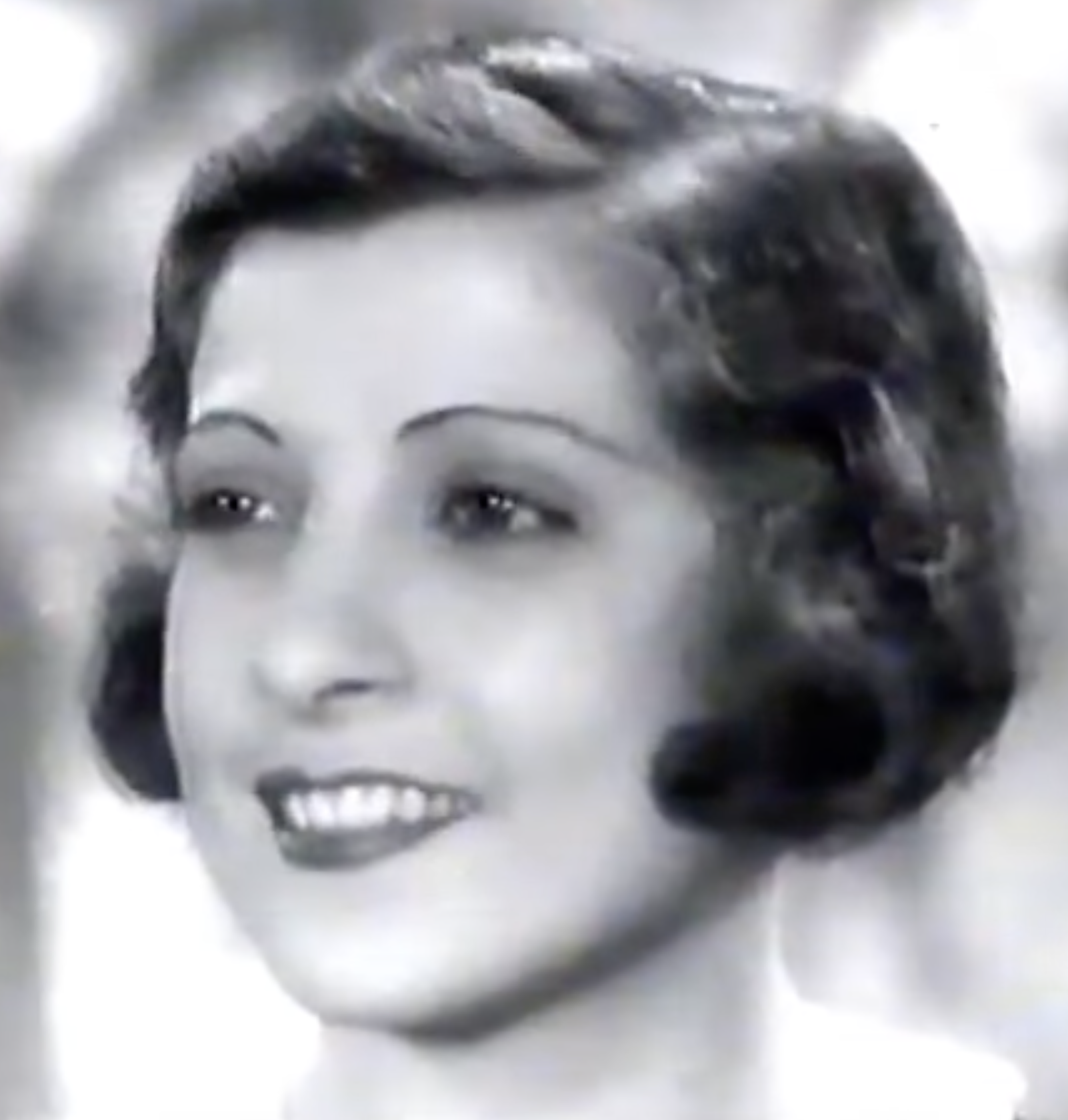
- Pola in the movie The Telephone Operator (1932)
- Born: Maria Luisa Betti di Montesano; 19 December 1909; Bologna, Kingdom of Italy
- Died: 17 December 1984 (aged 74); Milan, Italy
- Other name: Maria Luisa Betti di Montesano
- Occupation: Actress
- Years active: 1928–1958 (film)

Isa Pola (born Maria Luisa Betti di Montesano; 19 December 1909 – 17 December 1984) was an Italian stage and film actress. She appeared in more than 30 films during her career; an early screen role was the female lead in Steel (1933), a realist film set in the steelworking industry.

== Selected filmography ==
- Miryam (1929)
- The Song of Love (1930)
- Mother Earth (1931)
- The Opera Singer (1932)
- The Last Adventure (1932)
- La Wally (1932)
- The Telephone Operator (1932)
- Steel (1933)
- Ragazzo (1934)
- Creatures of the Night (1934)
- The Anonymous Roylott (1936)
- It Was I! (1937)
- The Widow (1939)
- Lucrezia Borgia (1940)
- Bridge of Glass (1940)
- Girl of the Golden West (1942)
- The Za-Bum Circus (1944)
- The Children Are Watching Us (1944)
- Fury (1947)
- Angelo tra la folla (1950)
- Margaret of Cortona (1950)
- Shadows on the Grand Canal (1951)
- The Rival of the Empress (1951)
- Three Forbidden Stories (1952)
- The Queen of Sheba (1952)
- The Phantom Musketeer (1952)
- Love and Chatter (1958)

== Bibliography ==
- Landy, Marcia. The Folklore of Consensus: Theatricality in the Italian Cinema, 1930-1943. SUNY Press, 2008.
