= Elio Steiner =

Italian actor

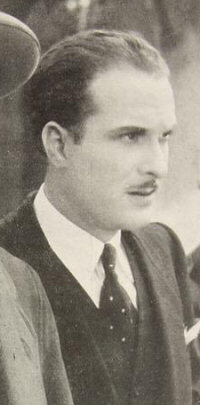
- Steiner in 1930
- Born: 9 March 1905; Stra, Veneto; Italy
- Died: 6 December 1965 (aged 61); Rome, Lazio; Italy
- Occupation: Actor
- Years active: 1928–1959 (film)

Elio Steiner (1905–1965) was an Italian stage and film actor. Steiner appeared in forty films during his career, including The Song of Love (1930), the first Italian sound film.

== Selected filmography ==
- The Golden Vein (1928)
- The Song of Love (1930)
- Assunta Spina (1930)
- The Man with the Claw (1931)
- Before the Jury (1931)
- Pergolesi (1932)
- Giallo (1933)
- The Hotel of the Absent (1939)
- The Boarders at Saint-Cyr (1939)
- Don Pasquale (1940)
- Giarabub (1942)
- La città dolente (1948)
- Black Fire (1951)
- The Phantom Musketeer (1952)
- The Prince with the Red Mask (1955)
- Arrivederci Firenze (1958)

== Bibliography ==
- Mancini, Elaine. Struggles of the Italian film industry during fascism, 1930-1935. UMI Research Press, 1985.
