= Dria Paola =

Italian actress (1909–1993)

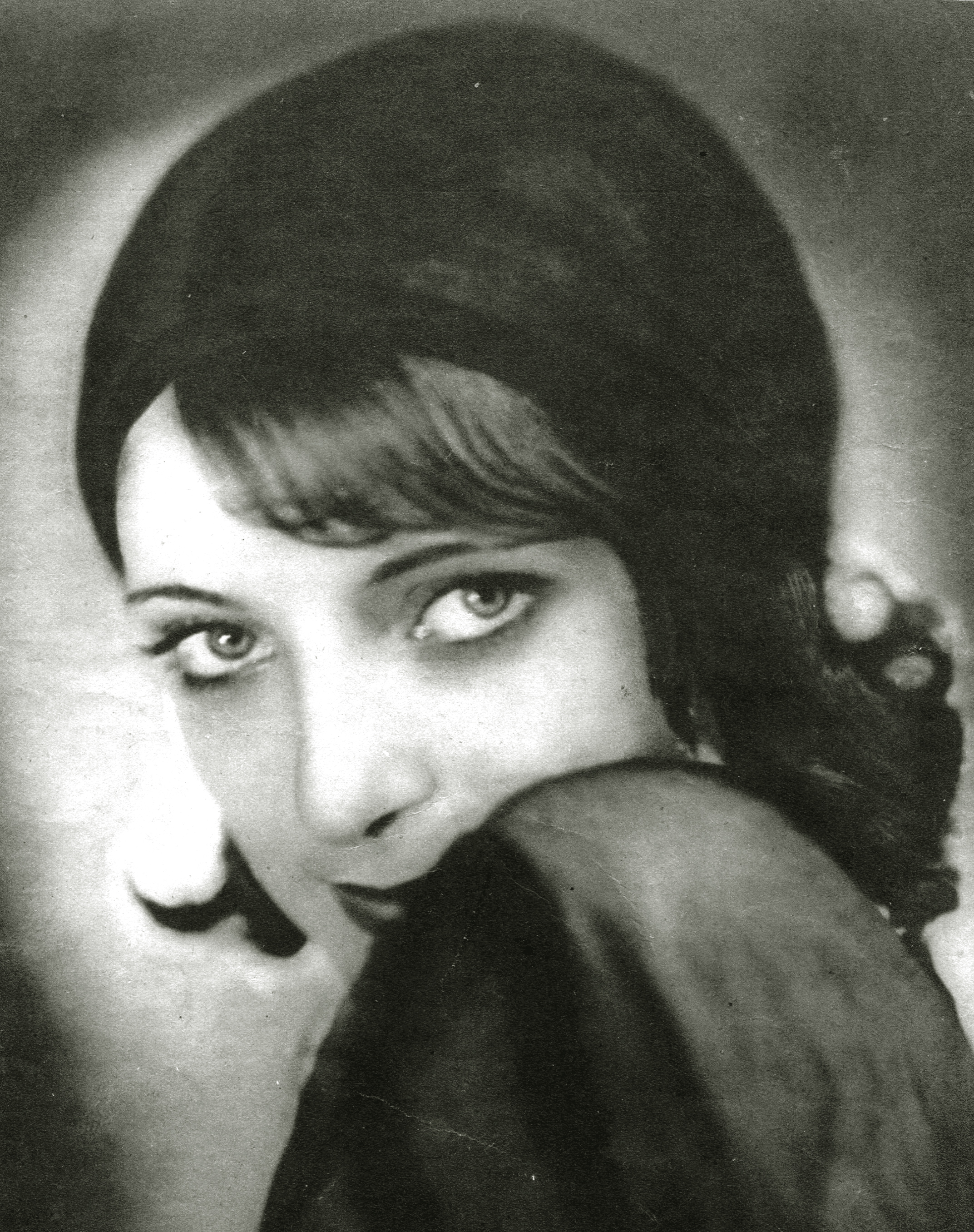
- Dria Paola in Cinematografo magazine 1929
- Born: 21 November 1909; Rovigo, Italy
- Died: 12 November 1993 (aged 83); Rome, Italy
- Other name: Etra Pitteo
- Occupations: Film actor Stage actor
- Years active: 1926–1942 (film)

Dria Paola (1909–1993) was an Italian stage and film actress. She played the female lead in Alessandro Blasetti's late silent Sun (1929). In 1930 she starred in the first Italian sound film The Song of Love.

== Selected filmography ==
- Sun (1929)
- The Song of Love (1930)
- The Man with the Claw (1931)
- Lowered Sails (1931)
- Courtyard (1931)
- The Doctor in Spite of Himself (1931)
- Pergolesi (1932)
- Fanny (1933)
- Mr. Desire (1934)
- The Blind Woman of Sorrento (1934)
- Adam's Tree (1936)
- Battles in the Shadow (1938)
- My Song to the Wind (1939)
- The Knight of San Marco (1939)
- The Hotel of the Absent (1939)
- The Night of Tricks (1939)
- The Black Panther (1942)

== Bibliography ==
- Forgacs, David & Gundle, Stephen. Mass Culture and Italian Society from Fascism to the Cold War. Indiana University Press, 2007.
- Reich, Jacqueline & Garofalo, Piero. Re-Viewing Fascism: Italian Cinema, 1922 to 1943. Indiana University Press, 2002.
