= Cines Studios =

Italian film company

The Cines Studios were film production studios located in the Italian capital Rome. They were established on Via Veio in 1930 by Stefano Pittaluga, head of the Cines film company, at the beginning of the sound era. It produced Italy's first sound film The Song of Love the same year. For several years it was the leading studio complex in Italy, until September 1935, when it suffered a major fire and was largely destroyed. This became a spur for the Italian government of Benito Mussolini to invest in the construction of a new development Cinecittà, the largest studio in Europe which opened in 1937.

The refurbished Cines studios continued to operate until 1956, but were often rented out for the use of other companies.

== Bibliography ==
- Brunetta, Gian Piero. The History of Italian Cinema: A Guide to Italian Film from Its Origins to the Twenty-first Century. Princeton University Press, 2009.
- Gundle, Stephen. Mussolini's Dream Factory: Film Stardom in Fascist Italy. Berghahn Books, 2013.
- Moliterno, Gino. The A to Z of Italian Cinema. Scarecrow Press, 2009.
- Shawn Levy. Dolce Vita Confidential: Fellini, Loren, Pucci, Paparazzi and the Swinging High Life of 1950s Rome. Hachette UK, 2016.
