= Dina Galli =

Italian actress (1877–1951)

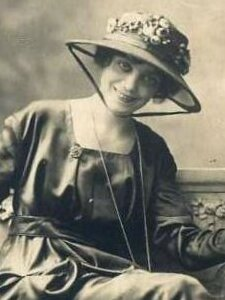
- Born: Clotilde Anna Maria Galli; 6 December 1877; Milan, Kingdom of Italy
- Died: 4 March 1951 (aged 73); Rome, Italy
- Occupation: Actress

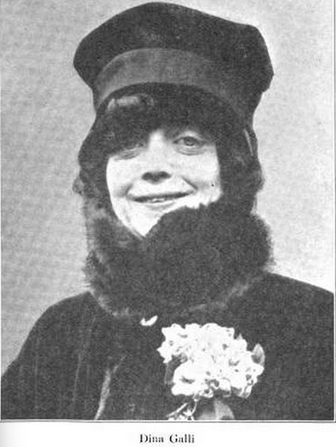
Dina Galli, from a 1917 publication

Dina Galli (born 6 December 1877 – 4 March 1951) was an Italian actress known for her comic stage roles. Galli also appeared in fourteen films during her career.

== Life and career ==
Born Clotilde Anna Maria Galli in Milan, Italy, Galli was the daughter of a well known theatrical character actress, Armellina Nesti. She debuted on stage as a child actress in a Milanese dialect stage company, the Olivieri company, and in 1890 she joined the stage company led by Edoardo Ferravilla. In 1900 she became main actress in the Talli-Gramatica-Calabresi, and in the following years she worked in the companies led by Enrico Viarisio, Enzo Biliotti, Antonio Gandusio and Nino Besozzi.

Galli made her film debut in 1914, in two silent films directed by Nino Oxilia. During the World War I, she voluntarily served in hospitals, entertaining wounded soldiers as a puppeteer. In 1935 she had a large success with the Giuseppe Adami's comedy play Felicita Colombo, and in 1937 she starred in a film adaptation with the same name directed by Mario Mattoli.

She spoke with a distinctive Lombardy accent.

== Selected filmography ==
- Ninì Falpalà (1933)
- Felicita Colombo (1937)
- Nonna Felicita (1938)
- Frenzy (1939)
- La zia smemorata (1940)
- Nothing New Tonight (1942)
- Il birichino di papà (1942)
- My Widow and I (1945)
- Vanity (1947)
