= Giuseppe Porcelli =

Giuseppe Porcelli may refer to:

- Giuseppe Porelli: 20th-century Italian movie actor
- Giuseppe Porcelli (Baroque painter): born in Messina, 1682
