= Captain Fracasse (1940 film) =

1940 Italian historical adventure film

- Directed by: Duilio Coletti
- Written by: Théophile Gautier (novel); Mario Pannunzio; Piero Tellini; Arrigo Benedetti; Duilio Coletti; Giacomo De Benedetti
- Produced by: Vittorio Vassarotti
- Starring: Elsa De Giorgi; Giorgio Costantini; Osvaldo Valenti
- Cinematography: Jan Stallich
- Edited by: Maria Rosada
- Music by: Piero Giorgi
- Production companies: Vi-Va Film; La Magie Film
- Distributed by: Artisti Associati
- Release date: 15 November 1940
- Running time: 90 minutes
- Country: Italy
- Language: Italian

Captain Fracasse (Italian: Capitan Fracassa) is a 1940 Italian historical adventure film directed by Duilio Coletti and starring Elsa De Giorgi, Giorgio Costantini and Osvaldo Valenti. It was made at the Cinecittà studios in Rome. The film is based on the 1863 novel of the same name by Théophile Gautier. Another adaptation Captain Fracasse was made three years later as a co-production between France and Italy.

== Cast ==
- Elsa De Giorgi as Isabella
- Giorgio Costantini as Il barone di Sigognac / Capitan Fracassa
- Osvaldo Valenti as Il duca Ruggero di Vallombrosa
- Nerio Bernardi as Il principe
- Clara Calamai as Iolanda De Foix
- Olga Vittoria Gentilli as Leonarda, la madre nobile
- Egisto Olivieri as Il tiranno & il capocomico
- Renato Chiantoni as Scapino
- Ernesto Gentili as Leandro
- Pia De Doses as Zerbina
- Mario Siletti as Giacomo Lampourde
- Fiorella Betti as Chiquita
- Guido Morisi as Vidalino
- Dina Perbellini as La marchesa Di Bruyeres
- Franco Coop as Il falso brigante
- Ernesto Bianchi as Matamoro
- Umberto Casilini as Pietro, il vecchio servitore dei Sigognac
- Gildo Bocci as Il capitano delle guardie
- Arnaldo Firpo
- Fedele Gentile
- Romano Karninki
- Carlo Mariotti
- Carla Pedroni
- Nico Pepe

== Bibliography ==
- Goble, Alan. The Complete Index to Literary Sources in Film. Walter de Gruyter, 1999.
