= Felicita Colombo =

- Dina Galli and Armando Falconi
- Directed by: Mario Mattoli
- Written by: Giuseppe Adami (play); Ivo Perilli; Aldo De Benedetti; Mario Mattoli
- Starring: Dina Galli; Armando Falconi; Giuseppe Porelli
- Cinematography: Carlo Montuori
- Edited by: Fernando Tropea
- Music by: Cesare A. Bixio; Ezio Carabella
- Production companies: Capitani Film; ICAR
- Distributed by: Variety Distribution
- Release date: 1937
- Running time: 78 minutes
- Country: Italy
- Language: Italian

Felicita Colombo is a 1937 Italian "white-telephones" comedy film directed by Mario Mattoli and starring Dina Galli, Armando Falconi and Giuseppe Porelli.

It was shot at the recently constructed Cinecittà Studios in Rome. It was followed by a sequel Nonna Felicita in 1938.

== Synopsis ==
Felicità Colombo runs a successful grocery business in Milan, and has become fairly wealthy. Her daughter Rosetta wishes to marry Nicolino, the son of an impoverished count, but his father opposes the marriage.

== Cast ==
- Dina Galli as Felicità Colombo
- Armando Falconi as Il conte Scotti
- Giuseppe Porelli as Nicolino
- Roberta Mari as Rosetta
- Paolo Varna as Valeriano Scotti - detto Larry
- Angelo Gandolfi as L'amministratore ragionier Grossi
- Giovanni Barrella as Carletto
- Nando Tamberlani as Giovannk
- Edda Soligo as Una cliente pettegola
- Olinto Cristina as L'ingegner Hirsch
- Emilio Petacci as Il fattore

== Bibliography ==
- Goble, Alan. The Complete Index to Literary Sources in Film. Walter de Gruyter, 1999.
