= Five to Nil =

1932 film directed by Mario Bonnard

- Directed by: Mario Bonnard
- Written by: Mario Bonnard; Michele Galdieri
- Produced by: Giuseppe Amato
- Starring: Angelo Musco; Milly; Osvaldo Valenti
- Cinematography: Ferdinando Martini
- Edited by: Mario Bonnard
- Music by: Giulio Bonnard; Dan Caslar
- Production company: JHA Film
- Distributed by: Caesar Film
- Release date: 1932
- Running time: 70 minutes
- Country: Italy
- Language: Italian

Five to Nil (Italian: Cinque a zero) is a 1932 Italian sports comedy film directed by Mario Bonnard and starring Angelo Musco, Milly, and Osvaldo Valenti. It was inspired by a 5–0 victory by A.S. Roma against their rivals Juventus in 1931. It was shot at the studios of Caesar Film and included scenes featuring the real-life Roma players.

== Synopsis ==
The president of a football club becomes concerned that his captain is spending too much time romancing a celebrated nightclub singer and not enough on training.

== Cast ==
- Angelo Musco as Presidente della società calcistica
- Milly as Billie Grac, a singer
- Osvaldo Valenti as Barenghi
- Franco Coop as Direttore d'Orchestra dell'Eden
- Mario Siletti as Professore di Matematica
- Luciano Molinari as Direttore del Teatro
- Maurizio D'Ancora as Masseur
- Oreste Bilancia as Masseur
- Tina Lattanzi as Moglie del Presidente
- Aristide Garbini as Membro del Club
- Umberto Sacripante as Membro del Club
- Maria Donati as Spectator
- Giorgio Bianchi as Executive
- Armando Fineschi as Executive
- Mario Colli as Executive
- Augusto Bandini as Augusto
- Camillo Pilotto as Augusto's Deputy
- Ninì Gordini Cervi as Billie's sister
- Ugo Fasano as Trainer
- Totò Mignone as Assistant Coach
- Attilio Ferraris as himself
- Fulvio Bernardini as himself
- Arturo Chini Ludueña as himself
- Bruno Dugoni as himself
- Fernando Eusebio as himself
- Cesare Augusto Fasanelli as himself
- Guido Masetti as himself
- Attilio Mattei as himself
- Rodolfo Volk as himself

== Bibliography ==
- Moliterno, Gino. Historical Dictionary of Italian Cinema. Scarecrow Press, 2008.
