= Claudio Ermelli =

Italian actor (1892–1964)

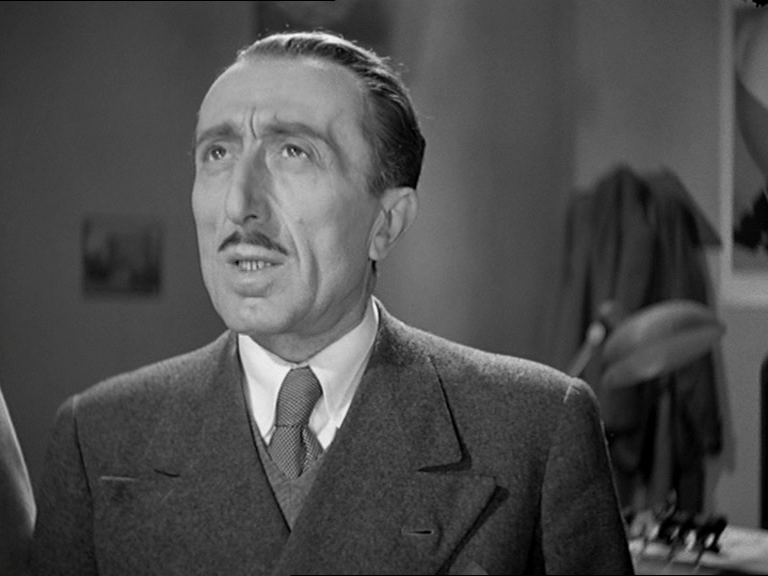
- Born: 24 July 1892; Turin, Italy
- Died: 29 October 1964 (aged 72); Rome, Italy
- Occupation: Actor
- Years active: 1915–1962

Claudio Ermelli (24 July 1892 – 29 October 1964) was an Italian film actor. He appeared in more than one hundred films from 1915 to 1962. Internationally, he is best known for his role as Giovanni, Gregory Peck's landlord in Roman Holiday (1953).

== Filmography ==
Film
Year	Title	Role	Notes
1932	Zaganella and the Cavalier	Carru Iongu	
1932	The Gift of the Morning	Cavaliere Castelli	
1933	Three Lucky Fools		
1933	I'll Always Love You	L'impiegato di Meregalli	
1933	Non c'è bisogno di denaro		
1933	Ninì Falpalà		
1933	La fortuna di zanze		
1934	La serva padrona	Don Alvise	
1936	Il re Burlone		
1936	Thirty Seconds of Love		
1936	La danza delle lancette		
1937	The Former Mattia Pascal	Il becchino	
1937	Condottieri	Conducente di un caro	
1937	Doctor Antonio	Tom	
1937	The Ferocious Saladin		
1937	The Castiglioni Brothers	L'usciere	
1938	Adam's Tree	L'invitato affamato	
1938	Il destino in tasca	Leonello Gigognani	
1938	The Ancestor		
1938	L'ultimo scugnizzo		
1938	Crispino e la comare		
1939	The Faceless Voice	Il maestro Tabarrini	
1939	Mad Animals	Il notaio	
1939	Il piccolo re		
1939	La mia canzone al vento	Il telegrafista	
1939	L'eredità in Corsa		
1940	Scandalo per bene		
1940	Vento di milioni		
1940	Giù il sipario		
1940	Trappola d'amore		
1940	Incanto di mezzanotte		
1940	Alessandro, sei grande!	Olimpio Dell'Incanto	
1940	Beyond Love		
1940	Don Pasquale		
1940	La zia smemorata	Taddeo, il cameriere del rifugio montano	
1941	La forza bruta	Lampione	
1941	Tosca	Paisiello	
1941	L'orizzonte dipinto	Rovini	
1941	Ridi pagliaccio	Un pensionante	
1941	The Happy Ghost	Battista	
1941	L'elisir d'amore	Il locandiere	
1941	The Secret Lover	Il cameriere Ottaviano	
1941	Villa da vendere	Matarazzo, zio di Lydia	
1942	La fortuna viene dal cielo	Il signor Maria	
1942	L'ultimo addio		
1942	Disturbance		
1942	Once a Week	Antonio - cameriere del 'Caffè della Posta'	
1942	La fabbrica dell'imprevisto	Il primo vagabondo	
1942	The Little Teacher	L'usciere	
1942	The Countess of Castiglione	Il nobile sulla sedia a rotelle	
1942	Pazzo d'amore	Il signore pignolo	
1943	Dente per dente		
1943	Two Hearts Among the Beasts	Agatino	
1944	In cerca di felicità	Gaspare	
1944	Lacrime di sangue		
1944	Mist on the Sea	Silva	
1945	Romulus and the Sabines	Germani	
1945	Down with Misery	Il guardia di Finanza	
1947	Il vento m'ha cantato una canzone		
1947	L'apocalisse		
1947	Lost in the Dark		
1947	Dove sta Zaza?		
1948	Il corriere di ferro		
1948	Baron Carlo Mazza	Padrone del contino	
1949	Addio Mimí!	Opera singer 'La Boheme'	
1949	Golden Madonna	Antonio	
1949	The Legend of Faust		
1949	Rondini in volo		
1949	Vivere a sbafo		
1949	Biancaneve e i sette ladri		
1950	Women Without Names		
1950	Sambo		
1951	Senza bandiera		
1951	La vendetta di una pazza		
1951	Era lui... sì! sì!	Mercante arabo	
1952	Cento piccole mamme		
1952	The Dream of Zorro	Maestro di Musica	
1952	What Price Innocence?	invitato alla festa di Artesi	
1952	The Woman Who Invented Love		
1952	Il romanzo della mia vita	The 'Odeon Theatre' Janitor	
1952	Primo premio: Mariarosa		
1953	Roman Holiday	Giovanni	
1953	Too Young for Love		
1954	L'Étrange Désir de monsieur Bard	Le détective italien	
1954	Ho ritrovato mio figlio		
1954	Tripoli, Beautiful Land of Love	Il signore stizzoso del Caffé-Concerto	
1955	Accadde tra le sbarre	Il Ragioniere - Mimì's colleague	
1955	Bravissimo	Conductor #1	
1957	Serenate per 16 bionde	The Lawyer	
1960	It Started in Naples	Luigi	
