= Carlotta Longo =

Italian mathematical physicist

Carlotta Longo (27 June 1895 – after 1959) born Carlotta Bresolin, was an Italian mathematical physicist who wrote a doctoral dissertation in 1918 related to general relativity, and then became a high school teacher in Rome. Longo's thesis, advised by Tullio Levi-Civita, presented what Ludwik Silberstein called a "geometrically elegant investigation" of electrostatics in general relativity.

Her second marriage was to the Afro-Italian actor Lodovico Longo, who played a minor character in the film Harlem.
