= Dan Caslar =

Italian composer

- Born: 1888; Naples, Campania, Italy
- Died: 1959 (aged 70–71); Rome, Lazio, Italy
- Other name: Donato Casolaro
- Occupation: Composer
- Years active: 1932–1950 (film)

Dan Caslar (1888–1959) was an Italian composer. He worked on several film scores. He developed a reputation as a composer of jazz.

== Selected filmography ==
- Five to Nil (1932)
- Three Lucky Fools (1933)
- Lucky Night (1941)
- A Husband for the Month of April (1941)
- The Happy Ghost (1941)
- A Living Statue (1943)
- Night Taxi (1950)

== Bibliography ==
- Goffredo Plastino & Joseph Sciorra. Neapolitan Postcards: The Canzone Napoletana as Transnational Subject. Scarecrow Press, 2016.
