= A Living Statue =

1943 film directed by Camillo Mastrocinque

- Directed by: Camillo Mastrocinque
- Written by: Tebaldo Cicconi (novel); Camillo Mastrocinque; Giorgio Pastina
- Produced by: Giulio Zaccheo
- Starring: Laura Solari; Fosco Giachetti; Camillo Pilotto
- Cinematography: Aldo Tonti
- Edited by: Duilio A. Lucarelli
- Music by: Dan Caslar; Alessandro Cicognini
- Production company: Alleanza Cinematografica Italiana
- Distributed by: Alleanza Cinematografica Italiana
- Release date: 14 April 1943
- Running time: 85 minutes
- Country: Italy
- Language: Italian

A Living Statue (Italian: La statua vivente) is a 1943 Italian drama film directed by Camillo Mastrocinque and starring Laura Solari, Fosco Giachetti and Camillo Pilotto.

The film's sets were designed by the art director Cesare Pavani. It was shot at the Farnesina Studios of Titanus in Rome.

== Cast ==
- Laura Solari as Luisa / Rita
- Fosco Giachetti as Paolo Vieri
- Camillo Pilotto as Cesare Parodi
- Lauro Gazzolo as Raffaele
- Dhia Cristiani as Irma
- Amina Pirani Maggi as Madre di Irma
- Olga Solbelli as La padrona della taverna
- Guido Celano as L'amante di Rita
- Renato Malavasi as Un invitato alla festa
- Pina Renzi
- Checco Rissone
- Lora Silvani
- Ciro Berardi
- Pietro Bigerna
- Angelo Cecchelin
- Carlo Dale
- Enrico Luzi

== Bibliography ==
- Gundle, Stephen. Mussolini's Dream Factory: Film Stardom in Fascist Italy. Berghahn Books, 2013.
