= For You I Have Sinned =

- Directed by: Mario Costa
- Written by: Giorgio Capitani; Antonio Leonviola; Anton Giulio Majano; Guido Malatesta
- Produced by: Giovanni Cosimini
- Starring: Pierre Cressoy; Milly Vitale; Frank Latimore
- Cinematography: Anchise Brizzi
- Edited by: Otello Colangeli
- Music by: Renzo Rossellini
- Production company: Orchidea Film
- Distributed by: Zeus Film
- Release date: 10 December 1953
- Running time: 90 minutes
- Country: Italy
- Language: Italian

For You I Have Sinned (Italian: Per salvarti ho peccato) is a 1953 Italian melodrama film directed by Mario Costa and starring Pierre Cressoy, Milly Vitale and Frank Latimore.

== Cast ==
- Pierre Cressoy as Guido
- Milly Vitale as Elena
- Frank Latimore as Reder
- Aldo Silvani as Dott. Martini
- Maria Laura Rocca as Anna
- Gianfranco Nicostra as Luigino
- Oscar Andriani as Il Commissario
- Bianca Doria as Agnese Reder
- Gino Sinimberghi as Cantano
- Liliana Bonfatti as Ines
- Ornella Moscucci as Cantano
- Orchestra e Coro del Teatro dell'Opera di Roma as Themselves

== Bibliography ==
- James Robert Parish & Kingsley Canham. Film Directors Guide: Western Europe. Scarecrow Press, 1976.
