= Thirty Seconds of Love =

1936 film directed by Mario Bonnard

- Directed by: Mario Bonnard
- Written by: Mario Bonnard; Aldo De Benedetti
- Produced by: Giuseppe Amato
- Starring: Nino Besozzi; Elsa Merlini; Enrico Viarisio
- Cinematography: Carlo Montuori
- Edited by: Eraldo Da Roma
- Music by: Giulio Bonnard
- Production company: Amato Film
- Release date: 24 October 1936
- Country: Italy
- Language: Italian

Thirty Seconds of Love (Italian: Trenta secondi d'amore) is a 1936 Italian romantic comedy film directed by Mario Bonnard and starring Nino Besozzi, Elsa Merlini and Enrico Viarisio.

== Cast ==
- Nino Besozzi as Piero Gualandi
- Elsa Merlini as Grazia Siriani
- Enrico Viarisio as Tullio Siriani - suo marito
- Enzo Gainotti as Annibale Siriani - padre di Tullio
- Jone Frigerio as Eleonora Sidioni - madre di Tullio
- Anna Magnani as Gertrude - sorella di Tullio
- Calisto Bertramo as Tranquillo Siriani - zio di Tullio
- Margherita Bagni as Giovanna Siriani - zia di Tullio
- Giuseppe Porelli as Avvocato Ferrini
- Tilde Mercandalli as L'infermiera dello studio dentistico
- Luigi Mottura as Cliente del dentista
- Lilla Brignone as Annetta
- Tatiana Pavoni as Rosina
- Oreste Bilancia as Signore grasso con il mal di denti
- Franca Barale as La cameriera personale di Grazia
- Alma Valeri as Altra cameriera
- Nicola Maldacea
- Carlo Ranieri
- Claudio Ermelli
- Ivanga Barol
- Emily Kathrin Hovert
- Margarita Bagori

== Bibliography ==
- Matilde Hochkofler. Anna Magnani. Gremese Editore, 2001.
