= Pierre Cressoy =

French actor (1924–1980)

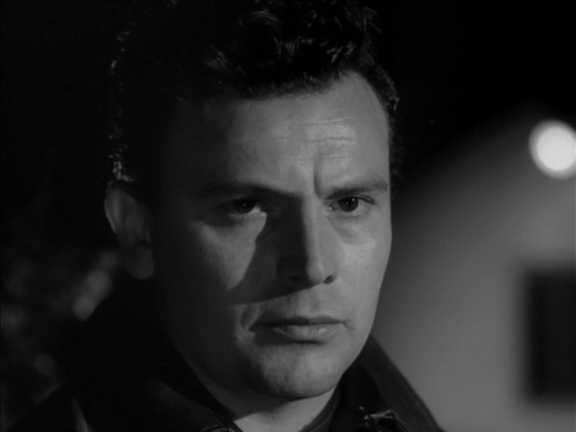
- Cressoy in Concert of Intrigue (1954)
- Born: Pierre Jules Lazare Cresson; 25 March 1924; Vendôme, Loir-et-Cher, France
- Died: 31 October 1980 (aged 56); Gorbio, Alpes-Maritimes, France
- Other names: Peter Cabot; Peter Cross
- Occupation: Actor
- Years active: 1947–1977

Pierre Cressoy (born Pierre Jules Lazare Cresson; 25 March 1924 – 31 October 1980) was a French film actor.

== Filmography ==
Year	Title	Role	Notes
1947	La Dernière Chevauchée	Èmile Valérian	
1948	The Tragic Dolmen	Jacques Mauclerc	
1949	At the Grand Balcony	Charlier	
1949	Mademoiselle de la Ferté	Jacques	
1950	Le Grand Cirque	Pierre Despont	
1950	Banco de Prince	Le prince d'Austravie, qui se fait passer pour M. Lefèvre	
1951	Darling Caroline	Pont-Bellanger / Malenger	
1951	Duel in Dakar	M. Pascal	
1952	At Sword's Edge	Don Sebastiano	
1952	Immortal Melodies	Pietro Mascagni	
1953	I sette dell'Orsa maggiore	Silvani	
1953	The Unfaithfuls	Osvaldo Dal Prà	
1953	The War of the Worlds	Man	Uncredited
1953	Les Compagnes de la nuit	Paul Gamelan	
1953	The Pagans	Massimo Colonna	
1953	Frine, Courtesan of Orient	Iperide	
1953	For You I Have Sinned	Guido	
1953	Verdi, the King of Melody	Giuseppe Verdi	
1954	The King's Prisoner	Henri / Louis XIV	
1954	Concert of Intrigue	Franco Alberti	
1954	Guai ai vinti	Franco	
1954	The Shadow	Gerardo Landi	
1954	A Free Woman	Gerardo Villabruna	
1955	The Last Five Minutes	Dagoberto	
1956	Walk Into Paradise	Jeff Clayton	
1956	Il prezzo della gloria		
1957	El Alamein	Capitano John Moore	
1957	Le belle dell'aria	Pierre	
1957	La chiamavan Capinera...	Paolo	
1959	Le donne ci tengono assai	Giacomo	
1959	Cavalier in Devil's Castle	Astolfo	
1959	Winter Holidays	Le comte Alfredo Parioli	
1959	Caterina Sforza, la leonessa di Romagna		
1960	David and Goliath	Gionata	
1960	Caccia al marito	Dario Alberti	
1961	The Mongols	Igor	
1962	Marco Polo	Cuday	
1964	Coriolanus: Hero without a Country	King Aufidio	
1964	The Lion of Thebes	Ramses	
1964	The Triumph of Hercules	Prince Milo	
1964	Hercules and the Treasure of the Incas	Vince	
1964	Blood for a Silver Dollar	Captain of the Young India	
1964	Squillo		
1965	Blood for a Silver Dollar	McCoy	
1965	Adiós gringo	Clayton Ranchester	
1966	Seven Guns for the MacGregors	Bandido	
1966	Navajo Joe	Dr. Chester Lynne	
1969	Eros e Thanatos		
1970	Tulips of Haarlem		
1971	Long Live Robin Hood	Sir Guy	
1972	Pianeta Venere		(final film role)

== Bibliography ==
- Davis, Ronald L. Hollywood Beauty: Linda Darnell and the American Dream. University of Oklahoma Press, 2014.
