= Two Million for a Smile =

- Directed by: Carlo Borghesio; Mario Soldati
- Written by: Carlo Borghesio; Renato Castellani; Mario Soldati
- Starring: Enrico Viarisio; Giuseppe Porelli; Elsa De Giorgi
- Cinematography: Mario Albertelli
- Edited by: Mario Bonotti
- Music by: Felice Montagnini
- Production company: Lux Film
- Distributed by: Lux Film
- Release date: 7 August 1939
- Running time: 75 minutes
- Country: Italy
- Language: Italian

Two Million for a Smile (Italian: Due milioni per un sorriso) is a 1939 Italian "white-telephones" comedy film directed by Carlo Borghesio and Mario Soldati and starring Enrico Viarisio, Giuseppe Porelli and Elsa De Giorgi.

It was shot at the Palatino Studios in Rome. The film's sets were designed by the art director Gino Brosio.

== Synopsis ==
An Italian industrialist who has made a fortune in America returns to Italy planning to make a film about a beautiful woman who smiled at him before he left his home country years before. With the assistance of a man who resembles his younger self he sets out to find the perfect woman for the role.

== Cast ==
- Enrico Viarisio as Mister Giacomo Perotti / Martino Bo
- Giuseppe Porelli as Spinelli, il segretario
- Elsa De Giorgi as Maria
- Sandra Ravel as Lisetta
- Romolo Costa as Il barista
- Dhia Cristiani as Piera
- Lauro Gazzolo as L'ufficiale giudiziario
- Pina Renzi as La guarderobiera
- Ermanno Roveri as Il banchista / il regista
- Giuseppe Pierozzi as Il cuoco / il truccatore
- Vasco Creti as Il capotreno
- Guido Barbarisi as L'elettricista / il capocameriere
- Carlo Bressan as L'autista del furgoncino
- Maria Polese as La padrona della copisteria
- Raimondo Van Riel as L'oste
- Carlo Ranieri as Il primo cameriere / l'operatore
- Antonietta Vilella as La fanciulla dell'organino
- Livia Minelli as Un'attrice

== Bibliography ==
- Roberto Curti. Riccardo Freda: The Life and Works of a Born Filmmaker. McFarland, 2017.
