= At Sword's Edge =

1952 film

- Directed by: Carlo Ludovico Bragaglia
- Written by: Leonardo Benvenuti; Agenore Incrocci; Furio Scarpelli
- Produced by: Francesco Alliata
- Starring: Frank Latimore; Milly Vitale; Pierre Cressoy
- Cinematography: Mario Albertelli
- Edited by: Roberto Cinquini
- Music by: Gino Marinuzzi Jr.
- Production company: Panaria Film
- Distributed by: Indipendenti Regionali
- Release date: 3 October 1952
- Running time: 96 minutes
- Country: Italy
- Language: Italian

At Sword's Edge (Italian: A fil di spada) is a 1952 Italian swashbuckler film directed by Carlo Ludovico Bragaglia and starring Frank Latimore, Milly Vitale and Pierre Cressoy. It was shot at Cinecittà Studios in Rome. The film's sets were designed by the art directors Mario Chiari and Gianni Polidori.

== Cast ==
- Frank Latimore as Don Ruy
- Milly Vitale as Linda
- Pierre Cressoy as Don Sebastiano
- Doris Duranti as Columba
- Franca Marzi as Rita
- Nando Bruno as Bruno
- Peter Trent as Don Hernando
- Arturo Bragaglia as Marzarillo
- John Kitzmiller
- Enrico Glori as Miguel
- Jone Morino
- Ugo Sasso
- Anthony La Penna
- Luciana Vedovelli
- Antonio Chinnici
- Ignazio Leone
- Leonardo Bragaglia

== Bibliography ==
- Enrico Lancia & Fabio Melelli. Attori stranieri del nostro cinema. Gremese Editore, 2006.
