= Music in the Square =

- Directed by: Mario Mattoli
- Written by: Aldo De Benedetti; Mario Mattoli; Giacomo Gentilomo; Gherardo Gherardi
- Starring: Milly; Ugo Ceseri; Enrico Viarisio
- Cinematography: Arturo Gallea
- Edited by: Giacomo Gentilomo
- Music by: Vittorio Mascheroni; Virgilio Ripa
- Production company: Etrusca Film
- Distributed by: Etrusca Film
- Release date: 1936
- Running time: 66 minutes
- Country: Italy
- Language: Italian

Music in the Square (Italian: Musica in piazza) is a 1936 Italian "white-telephones" comedy film directed by Mario Mattoli and starring Milly, Ugo Ceseri and Enrico Viarisio.

In Bevagna near Perugia, two cousins are rival musicians - one dedicated to classical music the other to modern light music.

== Cast ==
- Gemma Bolognesi
- Guido Celano
- Ugo Ceseri
- Mino Doro
- Anna Maria Dossena
- Carlo Duse
- Achille Majeroni
- Milly
- Maria Raspini
- Ermanno Roveri
- Agostino Salvietti
- Enrico Viarisio

== Bibliography ==
- Roberto Chiti & Roberto Poppi. I film: Tutti i film italiani dal 1930 al 1944. Gremese Editore, 2005.
