= Memo Benassi =

Italian actor (1886–1957)

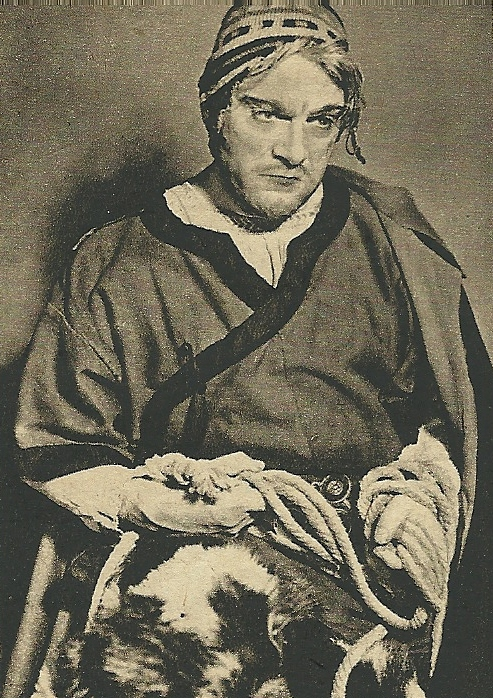
- Memo Benassi on stage (1942)
- Born: Domenico Benassi; 21 June 1886; Sorbolo, Emilia-Romagna; Italy
- Died: 24 February 1957 (aged 70); Bologna, Emilia-Romagna; Italy
- Occupation: Actor
- Years active: 1916–1955 (film)

Domenico "Memo" Benassi (21 June 1886 – 24 February 1957) was an Italian stage and film actor who appeared in more than forty films in a mixture of leading and supporting roles.

== Life and career ==
Born in Sorbolo, Benassi initially formed as a musician, studying cello at the Parma Conservatory. His professional acting career was launched in the late 1910s by Gualtiero Tumiati, who offered him a role in his stage company after noting him during an amateur theatrical performance. He was later enrolled in several major theater companies of the time, notably working with Eleonora Duse and Emma and Irma Gramatica. In 1925, he formed his own stage company. He made his film debut in 1932, and had main roles in films by Alessandro Blasetti and Max Ophüls, among others. He played the composer Beethoven in the 1942 film Rossini. After the war, he mostly focused on his theatrical career, working with Giorgio Strehler and Luchino Visconti.

== Selected filmography ==
- Notte di tempesta (1916)
- Mimì e gli straccioni (1916)
- Il gioiello sinistro (1917)
- La nemica (1917)
- Margheritella (1918)
- La scala di seta (1920)
- The Love Letters of Baroness S (1924) - Straßenmusikant Giovanni
- The Adventures of Sybil Brent (1925) - Theo Hartwig, Schriftsteller
- The Old Lady (1932) - Joe
- The Lucky Diamond (1933) - Il maggiordomo
- The Missing Treaty (1933) - John Brown - detective
- The Haller Case (1933) - Judge Haller
- L'impiegata di papà (1934) - Banchiere Monti
- Everybody's Woman (1934) - Leonardo Nanni
- Conquest of the Air (1936) - Francesco Lama di Brescia (uncredited)
- Lady of Paradise (1937) - Matteo Iran
- Scipione l'africano (1937) - Cato
- Tonight at Eleven (1938) - L'ambasciatore Leopoldo Norton
- Princess Tarakanova (1938) - L'ambasciatore russo
- La conquista dell'aria (1939) - Il Gesuita Franceesco Lama
- Orizzonte dipinto (1941) - Il burattinaio
- Il vagabondo (1941) - Fanfulla
- The Jester's Supper (1942) - Il Tornaquinci
- The Two Orphans (1942) - Il conte di Linières
- Fedora (1942) - Il principe Yariskine
- Rossini (1942) - Beethoven
- I due Foscari (1942) - Donato Almorò
- Fourth Page (1942) - Il pazzo
- The Son of the Red Corsair (1943) - Il marchese di Montelimar
- Measure for Measure (1943) - Lucio
- Peccatori (1945)
- Paese senza pace (1946) - Padron Toni
- L'ultimo sogno (1946)
- The Tyrant of Padua (1946) - Cesare, il pittore
- La taverna della libertà (1950)
- The Affairs of Messalina (1951) - Claudio / Claude
- Red Shirts (1952) - (uncredited)
- Too Bad She's Bad (1954) - (uncredited)
- Adriana Lecouvreur (1955) - Michonnet
