= City of Pain =

1949 film directed by Mario Bonnard

- Directed by: Mario Bonnard
- Written by: Mario Bonnard; Aldo De Benedetti; Anton Giulio Majano; Federico Fellini
- Cinematography: Tonino Delli Colli
- Music by: Giulio Bonnard
- Release date: 4 March 1949
- Language: Italian

City of Pain (Italian: La città dolente) is a 1949 Italian drama film directed by Mario Bonnard. It was shown as part of a retrospective "Questi fantasmi: Cinema italiano ritrovato" at the 65th Venice International Film Festival.

In 2008, the film was included on the Italian Ministry of Cultural Heritage’s 100 Italian films to be saved, a list of 100 films that "have changed the collective memory of the country between 1942 and 1978."

== Cast ==
- Luigi Tosi as Berto
- Barbara Costanova as Silvana
- Gianni Rizzo as Sergio
- Constance Dowling as Lubiza
- Elio Steiner as Martini
- Anita Farra
- Attilio Dottesio
- Gustavo Serena
- Pina Piovani
