= Isa Bellini =

Italian actress (1922–2021)

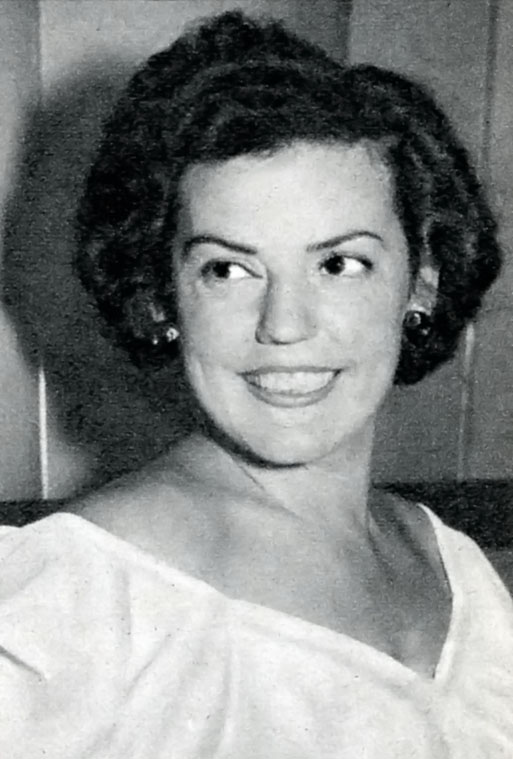
- Bellini in 1956
- Born: Isabella Calò; 19 June 1922; Mantua, Italy
- Died: 5 February 2021 (aged 98); Rome, Italy
- Occupations: Actress; voice actress

Isa Bellini (19 June 1922 – 5 February 2021) was an Italian actress, voice actress, presenter and singer.

== Life and career ==
Born Isabella Calò in Mantua, she was forced to change her family name of Jewish origins to Bellini because of the racial laws. After winning a national contest for singers she entered EIAR, where she was active both as a solo singer and as a member of the "Trio Primavera" with Thea Prandi and Wilma Mangini. During and shortly after the war, Bellini devoted herself exclusively to the theatre, working on stage with popular artists such as Totò, Renato Rascel, Walter Chiari and Umberto Spadaro. In 1948 she began working on radio as a presenter and entertainer. In 1954 she hosted the popular radio show Il motivo in maschera together with Mike Bongiorno and Lelio Luttazzi, and in the same year, she debuted as a television presenter in Italia. Nati per la musica. Bellini later gradually thinned out her appearances on media, focusing on dubbing.

== Selected filmography ==
- Una famiglia impossibile (1940)
- The Happy Ghost (1941)
- Without Family (1972)
- Love and Anarchy (1973)
- Camere da letto (1997)

== Dubbing roles ==
=== Animation ===
- DuckTales the Movie: Treasure of the Lost Lamp - Mrs. Featherby
- Lady and the Tramp - Aunt Sarah
