= Milly (actress) =

Italian singer and actress (1905–1980)

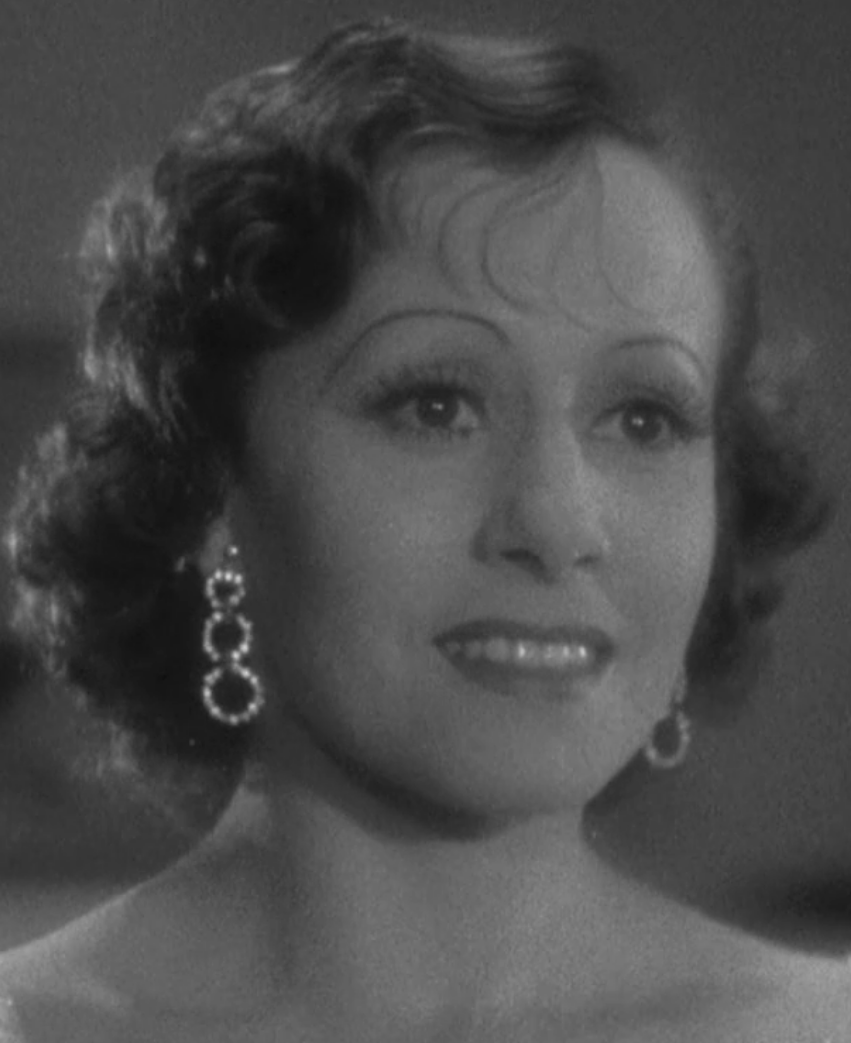
Milly in the movie Full Speed (1934)

Milly (born Carla Mignone; 26 February 1905 – 22 September 1980) was an Italian singer, actress, and cabaret performer.

== Biography ==
Her father abandoned her family in 1910 and she was brought up by her mother. She was the sister of Italian comedian Totò Mignone, with whom, along with her sister Mity, she performed as a child. As a teenager she worked at the Teatro Fiandra where she debuted as a singer in 1925. During this time, Prince Umberto di Savoia fell in love with her. Her sister, Mity Mignone, married Mario Mattoli.

She moved to the U.S. before World War II but returned to Italy after the war's end. She performed in The Threepenny Opera at the Piccolo Teatro in Milan directed by Giorgio Strehler. She recorded many albums in a variety of languages, and appeared in numerous films, mostly Italian, but also including The Girl from Scotland Yard (1937) and Gidget Goes to Rome (1963), as well as the Mario Bava cult horror classic I tre volti della paura (in the U.S. Black Sabbath; 1963), with Boris Karloff.

== Selected filmography ==
- Five to Nil (1932)
- Three Lucky Fools (1933)
- Full Speed (1934)
- I Love You Only (1935)
- Music in the Square (1936)
- The Girl from Scotland Yard (1937)
- On Such a Night (1937)
- The Ship of Condemned Women (1953)
- A Man of Straw (1958)
- ...And the Wild Wild Women (1959)
- Laura nuda (1961)
- Day by Day, Desperately (1961)
- Gidget Goes to Rome (1963)
- Black Sabbath (1963)
- Metti, una sera a cena (1969)
- The Conformist (1970)

In The Girl from Scotland Yard she sang the song We haven't a moment to lose.

== Discography ==
33 RPM

- 1964: Stramilano (Jolly, LPJ 5036)
- 1965: Il palcoscenico di Milly (Jaguar, SJGR 74004)
- 1966: Cabaret italiano fra due guerre 1917-1943 (la voce del padrone, QELP 8118)
- 1969: Canzoni e personaggi del cabaret di oggi (Joker, SM 3210)
- 1972: D'amore e di libertà (PDU, PLD A 5038/9) Album doppio
- 1974: Tante storie d'amore e di follia (Ariston Records, Ar 12141)
- 1975: Gogliardia anni trenta (Ariston Records, Ar 12307; con Carlo Pierangeli)
- 1980: Addio Tabarin... (Ri-Fi, RPO 72025)

45 RPM

- 1965: Passa la ronda/Scettico blues (La Voce del Padrone, mq 1952)
- 1965: Donna e giornale/La signora di trent'anni fa (La Voce del Padrone, mq 1953)
- 1975: Scarpe nuove/Giovedì speciale (Ariston Records, AR 00661)

EP

- 1964: Cabaret all'italiana (I dischi del sole, DS 27)
- 1965: Milly 1 (I dischi del sole, DS 48)

CD

- 1997: La leggenda di Milly (RTI Music)

== Book ==
Eduardo Paola "Milly. La vita e la carriera di Carla Mignone". Albatros 2015.
