= Zaganella and the Cavalier =

- Directed by: Giorgio Mannini; Gustavo Serena
- Written by: Luigi Capuana (play); Amleto Palermi
- Starring: Arturo Falconi; Marcella Albani; Carlo Lombardi
- Cinematography: Ferdinando Martini; Giovanni Vitrotti
- Edited by: Giorgio Mannini
- Music by: Umberto Mancini
- Production company: Caesar Film
- Distributed by: Caesar Film
- Release date: 1932
- Running time: 80 minutes
- Country: Italy
- Language: Italian

Zaganella and the Cavalier (Italian: Zaganella e il cavaliere) is a 1932 Italian comedy film directed by Giorgio Mannini and Gustavo Serena and starring Arturo Falconi, Marcella Albani and Carlo Lombardi. It is also known as Zaganella and the Honorable Gentleman.

== Cast ==
- Arturo Falconi as Il cavaliere Pidagna / Il vetturino Zaganella
- Marcella Albani as Lia, la sua figlia
- Carlo Lombardi as Ignazio Meli
- Maria Wronska as Elsa Moro, la cantante
- Olga Capri as Donna Mara
- Vasco Creti as Il notaio Scafiti
- Guido Riccioli as Balata
- Claudio Ermelli as Carru Iongu
- Giuseppe Pierozzi
- Oreste Bilancia
- Umberto Sacripante
- Pino Locchi as Robertino
- Silvana Mussone as Agatina

== Bibliography ==
- Goble, Alan. The Complete Index to Literary Sources in Film. Walter de Gruyter, 1999.
- Moliterno, Gino. Historical Dictionary of Italian Cinema. Scarecrow Press, 2008.
