= Ermanno Roveri =

Italian actor

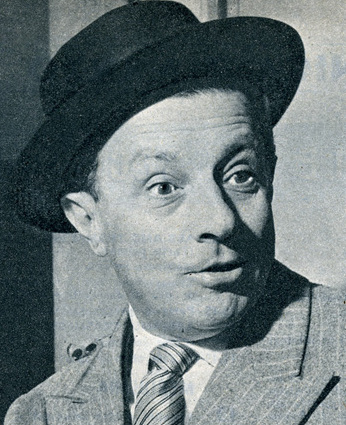
- Roveri in 1950
- Born: 5 October 1903; Milan, Italy
- Died: 28 December 1968 (aged 65); Milan, Italy
- Occupation: Actor
- Years active: 1912-1965

Ermanno Roveri (5 October 1903 – 28 December 1968) was an Italian film actor. He appeared in 39 films between 1912 and 1965.

== Selected filmography ==
- The Private Secretary (1931)
- Everybody's Secretary (1933)
- Full Speed (1934)
- The Last of the Bergeracs (1934)
- Aldebaran (1935)
- Ginevra degli Almieri (1935)
- The Man Who Smiles (1936)
- King of Diamonds (1936)
- Music in the Square (1936)
- The Fornaretto of Venice (1939)
- Backstage (1939)
- Two Million for a Smile (1939)
- Biraghin (1946)

== Bibliography ==
- John Holmstrom, The Moving Picture Boy: An International Encyclopaedia from 1895 to 1995, Norwich, Michael Russell, 1996, p. 22.
