= Frine, Courtesan of Orient =

1953 film directed by Mario Bonnard

- Directed by: Mario Bonnard
- Written by: Nicola Manzari
- Story by: Bruno Baratti; Mario Bonnard; Cesare Vico Lodovici; Ivo Perilli
- Produced by: Alberto Manca
- Starring: Elena Kleus; Pierre Cressoy; Tamara Lees
- Cinematography: Mario Albertelli
- Music by: Giulio Bonnard
- Release date: 1953
- Language: Italian

Frine, Courtesan of Orient (Italian: Frine, cortigiana d'Oriente) is a 1953 Italian epic adventure film directed by Mario Bonnard and starring Elena Kleus and Pierre Cressoy. Sergio Leone served as assistant director.

== Plot ==
The film is based on the trial of the ancient Greek courtesan Phryne. In the film a young woman, Afra, escapes imprisonment in Thebes before being brought to Athens as a slave; there she takes on the name Frine and becomes a courtesan. She falls in love with the orator Iperide. After Frine takes on the role of a goddess at the Eleusinian Mysteries she is charged with impiety; at the trial Iperide saves Frine.

== Cast ==
- Elena Kleus: Frine
- Pierre Cressoy: Iperide
- Tamara Lees: Criside
- Giulio Donnini: Lamaco
- Roldano Lupi: Prassitele
- John Kitzmiller: Nabus
- Lamberto Picasso: Titteca
- Barbara Berg: Ate
- Franco Silva: Claus
- José Jaspe: Crosio
- Carlo Tamberlani: Assirione
- Nico Pepe: Dignitary
- Gian Paolo Rosmino: Taulete
- Charles Fawcett: King Arconte
- Mino Doro: Osco
- Vittorio Duse: Official
- Edda Soligo: Cleo
- Enzo Biliotti: Macio
- Bruna Corrà: Telesilla
- Lilia Landi: Diala
- Cesare Fantoni: Prosecutor
- Mariolina Bovo: First Slave
- Fanny Landini: Second Slave
- Franca Tamantini: Frine's Slave
- Luisella Boni: Touni
- Luigi Pavese: Warrior
