= The Happy Ghost (1941 film) =

- Directed by: Amleto Palermi
- Written by: Carlo Ludovico Bragaglia; Pier Luigi Faraldo; Ettore Maria Margadonna; Amleto Palermi; Pietro Solari
- Starring: Totò; Luigi Pavese; Franco Coop
- Cinematography: Vincenzo Seratrice
- Edited by: Giacinto Solito
- Music by: Dan Caslar
- Production companies: Fono Roma; Produzione Capitani Film
- Distributed by: ENIC
- Release date: 16 March 1941
- Running time: 67 minutes
- Country: Italy
- Language: Italian

The Happy Ghost (Italian: L'allegro fantasma) is a 1941 Italian "white-telephones" comedy film directed by Amleto Palermi and starring Totò, Luigi Pavese and Franco Coop.

It was shot at the Cinecittà studios in Rome. The film's art direction was by Gastone Medin.

== Plot ==
The noble Pantaleo Santa Paola dies suddenly, without writing a will. Immediately in the villa go his three grandchildren and three other relatives. All claim family assets, and at the end of the story reaches the poor Nicolino, who is also the nephew of Pantaleo. The Pantaleo ghost appears while the dispute rages and declares his true heir.

== Cast ==
- Totò as Nicolino & Gelsomino & Antonino
- Luigi Pavese as Temistocle
- Franco Coop as Maurizio Devalier
- Isa Bellini as Rosa
- Wilma Mangini as Titti
- Thea Prandi as Lilli
- Paolo Stoppa as Gigetto
- Amelia Chellini as Zia Lia
- Dina Perbellini as Zia Giovanna
- Elli Parvo as Erika
- Claudio Ermelli as Battista
- Augusto Di Giovanni as Asdrubale
- Livia Minelli as Lina, la cameriera
- Giulio Donadio as Il brigadiere
- Lydia Johnson as Una signora
- Mario Giannini as Il giovane biondo
- Gioia Collei as La ragazzina
- Rio Nobile
- Egilda Cecchini
- Lucy D'Albert as Una soubrette
- Emilio Petacci as Anatolio, il maggiordomo di Devalier

== Bibliography ==
- Aprà, Adriano. The Fabulous Thirties: Italian cinema 1929-1944. Electa International, 1979.
