= Adriana Sivieri =

Argentine-born Italian film actress (1918–1970)

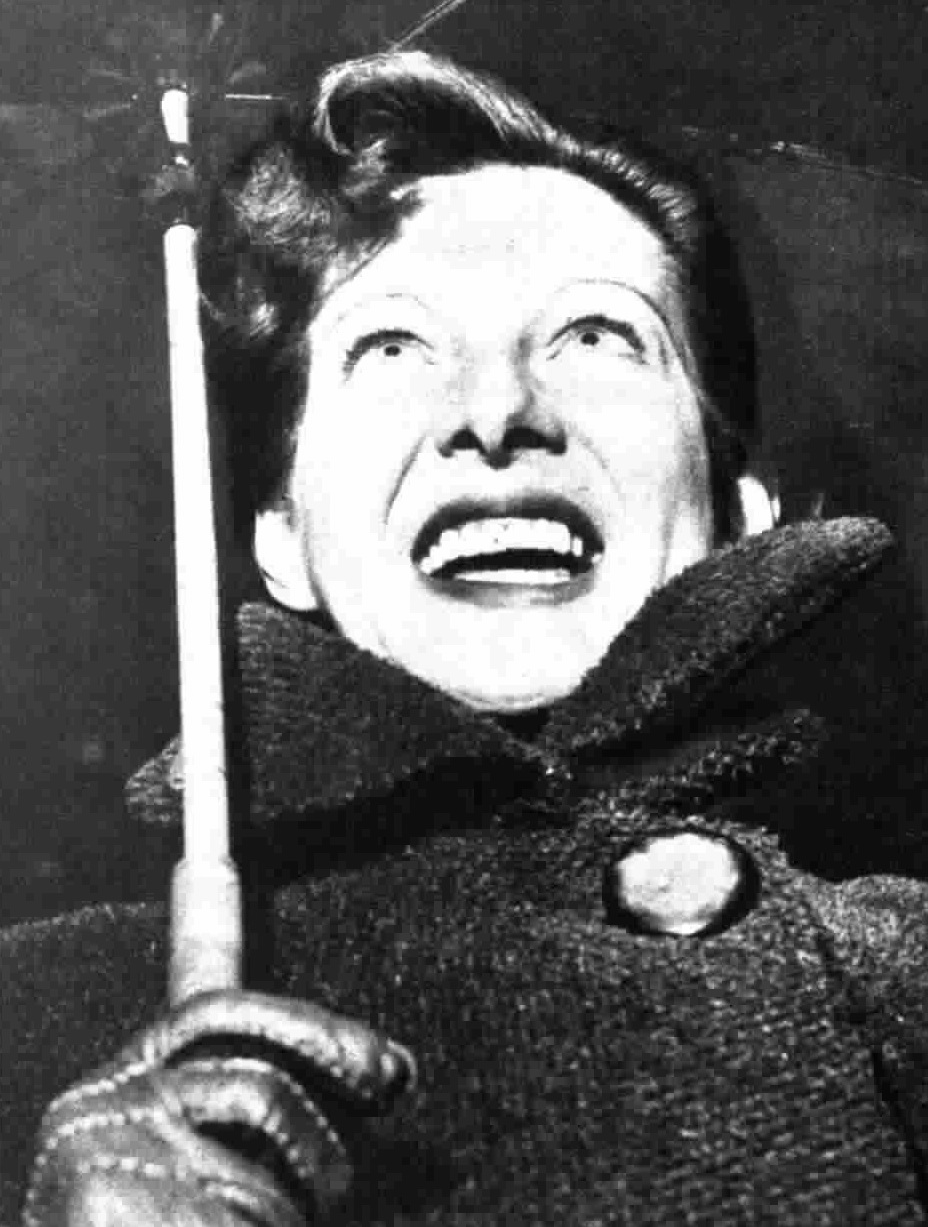
- Sivieri in 1954
- Born: 21 June 1918; Buenos Aires, Argentina
- Died: 17 November 1970 (aged 52); Milan, Italy
- Occupation: Film actress
- Years active: 1942–1953

Adriana Sivieri (21 June 1918 – 17 November 1970) was an Argentine-born Italian film actress. She also worked in radio and as a voice actor, dubbing foreign films for release in Italy. Sivieri died in Milan on 17 November 1970, at the age of 52.

== Selected filmography ==
- Alone at Last (1942)
- No Turning Back (1945)
- Vanity (1947)
- Bitter Rice (1949)
- At the Edge of the City (1953)

== Bibliography ==
- Bertellini, Giorgio. The Cinema of Italy. Wallflower Press, 2004.
