= The Models of Margutta =

1946 film

- Directed by: Giuseppe Maria Scotese
- Written by: Amleto Fattori; Giuseppe Maria Scotese
- Starring: Liliana Laine; Claudio Gora; Carlo Campanini
- Cinematography: Tino Santoni
- Edited by: Mario Serandrei
- Music by: Giovanni Fusco
- Production company: A.R.S. Società Produzioni Cinematografiche
- Distributed by: Regionale
- Release date: 16 May 1946
- Running time: 82 minutes
- Country: Italy
- Language: Italian

The Models of Margutta (Italian: Le modelle di via Margutta) is a 1946 Italian drama film directed by Giuseppe Maria Scotese and starring Liliana Laine, Claudio Gora and Carlo Campanini. The film is set amongst the artistic community who live on the Via Margutta in Rome. Several real artists appeared in the film as themselves.

== Cast ==
- Liliana Laine as Gianna
- Claudio Gora as Andrea Saveri
- Carlo Campanini as Romoletto, il postino
- Wanda Capodaglio as Evelina
- Vera Carmi as Paola
- Manoel Roero as Gio Stelli
- Paola Borboni as La moglie di Andrea
- Lauro Gazzolo as Federico
- Petr Sharov as Peter
- Rossana Montesi as Francesca
- Achille Millo as Mario Fassi
- Mario Guerzoni as Pasquale
- Carlo Mazzarella as L'esattore
- Pericle Fazzini as himself
- Franco Gentilini as himself
- Virgilio Guzzi as himself
- Luigi Montanarini as himself
- Ilya Peikov as himself
- Angelo Savelli as himself
- Antonio Scordia as himself
- Orféo Tamburi Himself
- Marina Doge as Una ballerina
- Adriana Serra as Un' amirattrice di Giò

== Bibliography ==
- Hischak, Thomas S. The Encyclopedia of Film Composers. Rowman & Littlefield, 2015.
