= Nonna Felicità =

1938 film

- Directed by: Mario Mattoli
- Written by: Giuseppe Adami (play); Aldo De Benedetti; Mario Mattoli
- Produced by: Alfredo Proia
- Starring: Dina Galli
- Cinematography: Carlo Montuori
- Edited by: Fernando Tropea
- Music by: Giovanni D'Anzi
- Release date: October 1938
- Running time: 76 minutes
- Country: Italy
- Language: Italian

Nonna Felicità is a 1938 Italian film directed by Mario Mattoli and starring Dina Galli. It was made as a sequel to the 1937 film Felicita Colombo. It was shot at the Cinecittà Studios in Rome. The film adapts a play of the same name by Giuseppe Adami.

== Cast ==
- Dina Galli as Felicità Colombo
- Armando Falconi as Il conte Jean Scotti
- Maurizio D'Ancora as Ambrogino
- Nino Taranto as Nino Senesi
- Angelo Gandolfi as Giuseppe Grossi
- Lilia Dale as Odette (as Lilly Hand)
- Lydia Johnson as La baronessa Michette
- Paolo Varna as Il barone (as Ottorino Visconti)

== Background ==
In the films, released in 1938, Galli reprises the role she had on stage, in two plays that were well received. The film is the screen debut of the theater actor Nino Taranto, who would appear in more than a 100 films.
