= Romulus and the Sabines (1945 film) =

- Directed by: Mario Bonnard
- Written by: Mario Amendola; Mario Bonnard; Giorgio Moser
- Starring: Totò; Carlo Campanini; Clelia Matania
- Cinematography: Giuseppe La Torre
- Edited by: Gino Talamo
- Music by: Cesare A. Bixio; Giulio Bonnard
- Production company: Capitani Film
- Distributed by: Titanus Distribuzione
- Release date: 21 November 1945
- Running time: 90 minutes
- Country: Italy
- Language: Italian

Romulus and the Sabines (Italian: Il ratto delle sabine) is a 1945 Italian comedy film directed by Mario Bonnard and starring Totò, Carlo Campanini, and Clelia Matania. It was one of several of Totò's postwar comedies to use elements of neorealism.

The film is based on the German comedy Der Raub der Sabinerinnen (1884) by Franz von Schönthan and Paul von Schönthan.

== Plot summary ==
Toto is the actor of a penniless theater group: they arrive in a small town to offer their theatrical calendar to the mayor. Meanwhile, a professor: caught but shy, presents to the community his play, "The Rape of the Sabine Women", but the provincial inhabitants hate mortally the theater. The professor is in despair, but Toto willingly accepts the part of the work, just to eat something. At the end, the opera is performed at the theater, but it is a disaster, because the genre is drama, but Toto gullibility makes it a comic farce.

== Cast ==
- Totò as Aristide Tromboni
- Carlo Campanini as Maestro Ernesto Molmenti
- Clelia Matania as Rosina
- Laura Gore as Paolina
- Olga Solbelli as Matilde
- Luisa Alliani as Ermenegilda
- Lia Corelli as Mariannina
- Fosca Spadaro as La figlia di Tancredi
- Aldo Silvani as Tancredi
- Mario Pisu as Alberto Randoni
- Giuseppe Rinaldi as Emilio
- Claudio Ermelli as Germani
- Mario Castellani as Il proprietario del teatro
- Peppino Spadaro as Turiddu, il macchinista
- Aristide Garbini as Bartolomeo
- Ciro Berardi as Il brigadiere dei carabinieri
- Italo Pirani as Il direttore della scuola
- Erminio Spalla as Giovanni, il carrettiere

== See also ==
- The Abduction of the Sabine Women (1928)
- The Abduction of the Sabine Women (1936)
- The Abduction of the Sabine Women (1954)

== Bibliography ==
- Flavia Brizio-Skov. Popular Italian Cinema: Culture and Politics in a Postwar Society. I.B.Tauris, 2011.
