= I'll Always Love You (1933 film) =

1933 film

- Directed by: Mario Camerini
- Written by: Guglielmo Alberti; Mario Camerini; Ivo Perilli
- Starring: Elsa De Giorgi; Nino Besozzi; Mino Doro
- Cinematography: Ubaldo Arata
- Edited by: Fernando Tropea
- Music by: Ezio Carabella; Riccardo Pick Mangiagalli
- Production company: Cines-Pittaluga
- Distributed by: Società Anonima Stefano Pittaluga
- Release date: 30 April 1933
- Running time: 70 minutes
- Country: Italy
- Language: Italian

I'll Always Love You (Italian: T'amerò sempre) is a 1933 Italian romantic drama film directed by Mario Camerini and starring Elsa De Giorgi, Nino Besozzi and Mino Doro. It was shot at the Cines Studios in Rome. The film's sets were designed by the art director Gastone Medin. A separate French-language version Je vous aimerai toujours was also produced. In 1943 Camerini remade the film under the same title.

== Cast ==
- Elsa De Giorgi as Adriana Rosé
- Nino Besozzi as Mario Fabbrini
- Mino Doro as Il conte Diego
- Robert Pizani as Oscar, il parruchiere
- Loris Gizzi as Meregalli
- Pina Renzi as La signora Clerici
- Giacomo Moschini as L'inquilino del piano di sotto
- Claudio Ermelli as L'impiegato di Meregalli
- Nora Dani as Clelia, sorella di Mario
- Pinca Nova as La madre di Mario
- Maria Persico as Gaby
- Zita Soares as La signora Krauss
- Cecyl Tryan as Una signora del gran mondo

== Bibliography ==
- Ben-Ghiat, Ruth (2015). Italian Fascism's Empire Cinema. Bloomington: Indiana University Press. ISBN 978-0253015594.
- Burke, Frank (2017). A Companion to Italian Cinema. Oxford: John Wiley & Sons. ISBN 978-1444332285.
