= Elsa De Giorgi =

Italian film actress and writer (1914–1997)

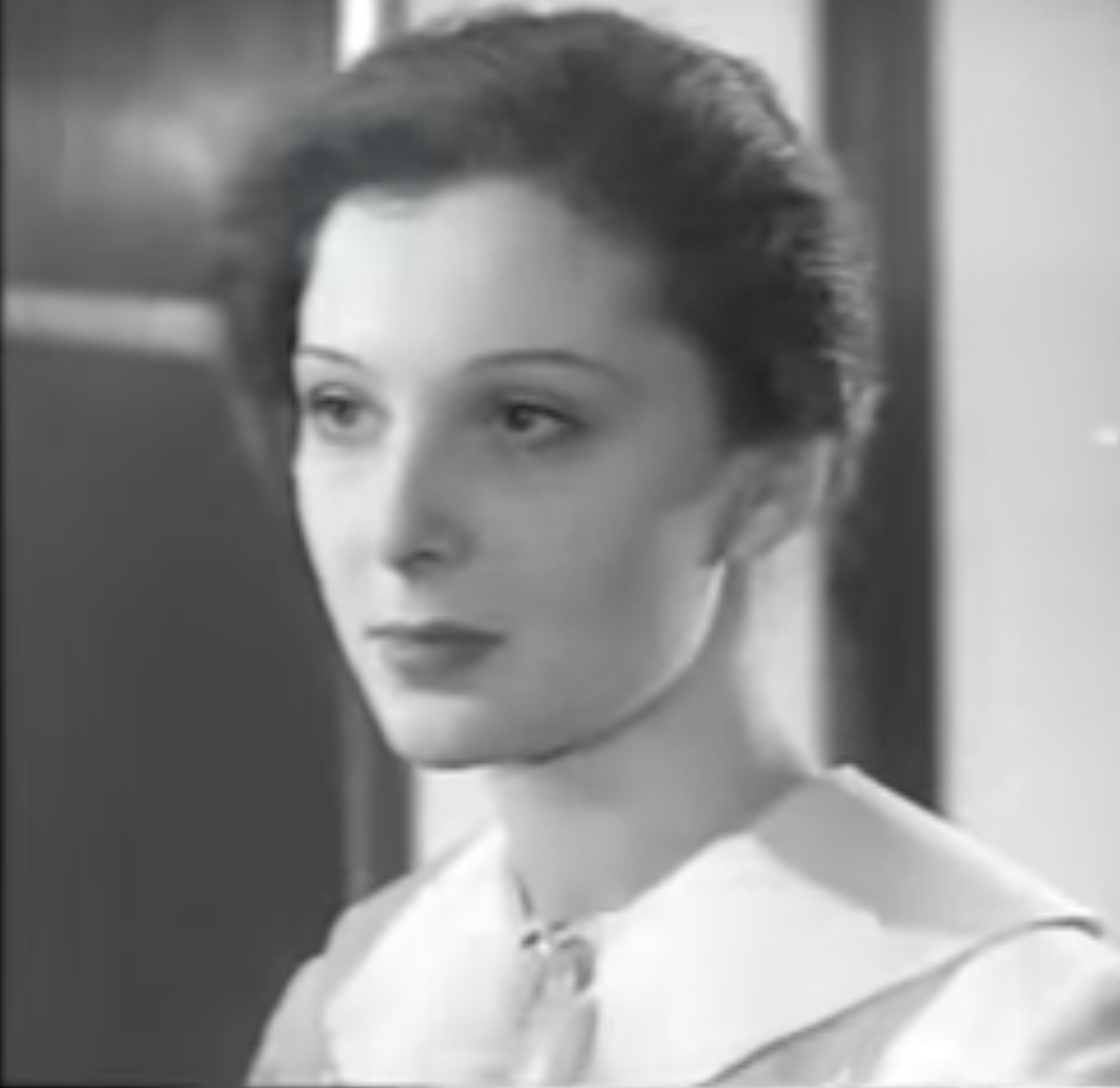
- De Giorgi in the movie T'amerò sempre (1933)
- Born: 26 January 1914; Pesaro, Marche, Kingdom of Italy
- Died: 12 September 1997 (aged 83); Rome, Italy
- Other name: Elsa Giorgi Alberti
- Occupation: Actress
- Years active: 1933–1994 (film)

Elsa De Giorgi (26 January 1914 – 12 September 1997) was an Italian film actress and writer. She appeared in twenty seven films, including Duilio Coletti's Captain Fracasse (1940).

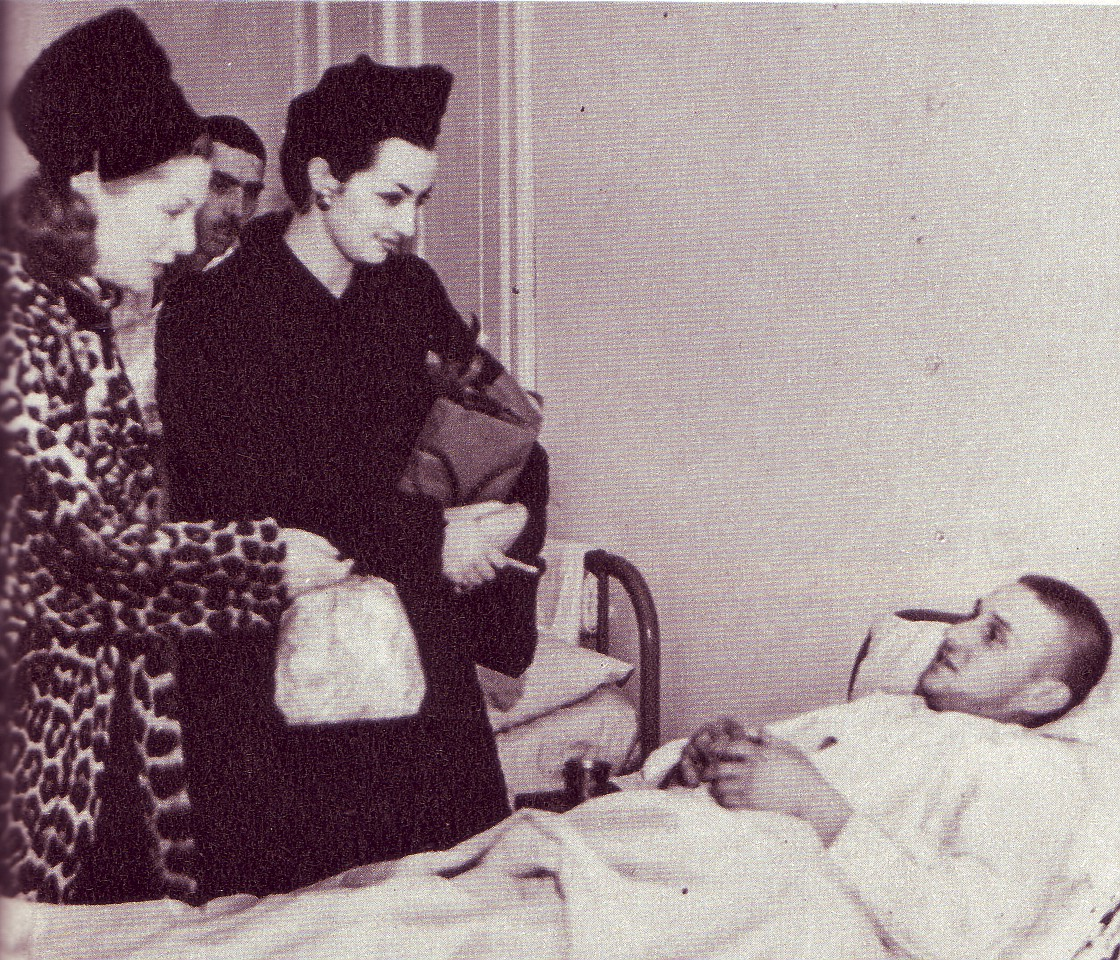
Doris Duranti and Elsa De Giorgi visiting a soldier during World War II (1941)

== Biography ==
De Giorgi was born in Pesaro, Marche, from a family originally from Bevagna, a small town close to Spoleto in Umbria. When she was 18, she worked as a model, and was spotted by Mario Camerini, who offered her a role in his film T'amerò sempre (1933). De Giorgi then took up acting full-time, and worked with many Italian directors, including Pier Paolo Pasolini, Luigi Zampa, Mario Soldati and Alberto Sordi. In 1974 she wrote, directed and produced the film Sangue più fango uguale logos passione.

In 1955, De Giorgi published her first book, I coetanei (The Peers), a recapitulation of her time during Italian Civil War as well as a tribute to her husband, Sandrino Contini Bonacossi. The book was published by Einaudi with a preface by Gaetano Salvemini. It won the Premio Viareggio.

In the late 1950s De Giorgi had a romantic relationship with Italo Calvino. Their time together is chronicled in her 1992 book Ho visto partire il tuo treno (I Saw Your Train Rolling).

In the early 1960s she worked as a theatre critic for the Rome-based magazine Pensiero Nazionale.

De Giorgi's archive is housed at the Centre for the Studies of Contemporary and Modern Writers at University of Pavia.

== Filmography ==
Year	Title	Role
1933	Nini Falpala	Torrazza's Daughter
1933	L'impiegata di papà	Carla Monti
1933	I'll Always Love You	Adriana Rosé
1934	Loyalty of Love	Princess Carolina Jablonowska
1934	Lady of Paradise	Anna Lucenti
1934	Port	Mariuccia
1934	L'eredità dello zio buonanima	Titina
1936	But It's Nothing Serious	Elsa
1938	La sposa dei Re	Désirée Clary
1938	La mazurka di papà	La marchesina Lucia
1939	The Fornaretto of Venice	Annetta
1939	The Faceless Voice	La primatrrice
1939	Two Million for a Smile	Maria
1939	Montevergine	Carmencita
1940	Captain Fracasse	Isabella
1941	The Mask of Cesare Borgia	Dianora
1942	The Adventures of Fra Diavolo	Fortunata Consiglio
1942	Tentazione	Elsa Passmann
1943	Sant'Elena, piccola isola	Betsy
1944	The Innkeeper	Ortensia
1946	The Tyrant of Padua	Caterina Bragadin in Malipieri
1947	Manù il Contrabbandiere	Florence Geraldy
1963	RoGoPaG	Producer's Mother
1975	Salò, or the 120 Days of Sodom	Signora Maggi
1992	Acquitted for Having Committed the Deed	Countess Nicoletta
1992	Poussière de diamant	
1994	Cadabra	

== Bibliography ==
- Goble, Alan. The Complete Index to Literary Sources in Film. Walter de Gruyter, 1999.
