= Lady of Paradise =

1934 film

- Directed by: Enrico Guazzoni
- Written by: Guido Cantini (play); Enrico Guazzoni
- Produced by: Alfredo Guarini
- Starring: Elsa De Giorgi; Mino Doro; Memo Benassi
- Cinematography: Ubaldo Arata
- Music by: Umberto Mancini
- Production company: Tirrenia Film
- Release date: 1934
- Running time: 75 minutes
- Country: Italy
- Language: Italian

Lady of Paradise (Italian: La signora Paradiso) is a 1934 Italian comedy film directed by Enrico Guazzoni and starring Elsa De Giorgi, Mino Doro and Memo Benassi.

It was shot at the Tirrenia Studios. The film's sets were designed by the art director Alfredo Montori.

== Cast ==
- Elsa De Giorgi as Anna Lucenti
- Mino Doro as Delfo Delfi
- Memo Benassi as Matteo Iran
- Franco Coop as Geremia Bianchi
- Augusto Marcacci as Il conte
- Enzo Biliotti as Lukas
- Ernesto Marini
- Ugo Gracci
- Paolo Bernacchi

== Bibliography ==
- Goble, Alan. The Complete Index to Literary Sources in Film. Walter de Gruyter, 1999.
