= Thea Prandi =

Italian actress and singer

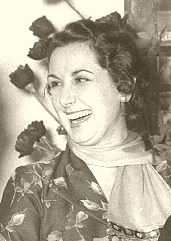
- Born: Enrichetta Thea Prandi; 25 November 1925; Turin, Kingdom of Italy
- Died: 8 June 1961 (aged 35); Rome, Italy
- Other name: Enrichetta Thea Prandi
- Occupations: Actress; singer
- Spouse: Eduardo De Filippo (1956–1959)
- Children: Luca De Filippo; Luisa "Luisella" De Filippo

Thea Prandi (born Enrichetta Thea Prandi; 25 November 1925 – 8 June 1961) was an Italian actress and singer who was active in the 1940s and 1950s. She is known for her roles in Una famiglia impossibile (1940) and L'allegro fantasma (1941), and as the narrator in Neapolitans in Milan (1953).

Prandi sang on EIAR radio broadcasts as a member of the "Trio Primavera" with Isa Bellini and Wilma Mangini. After retiring from showbusiness, she worked as an administrator of the Teatro San Ferdinando in Naples.

== Personal ==
Prandi met actor and playwright Eduardo De Filippo in 1947, while being a soubrette in the revue company "Teatro dei Fiorentini". They were married for three years from 1956 to 1959. Prior to their marriage, they had two children together; actor Luca De Filippo and a daughter Luisa "Luisella" De Filippo. Luisella died at the age of 10 from a cerebral hemorrhage in 1960. During their relationship, Prandi served as De Filippo's secretary and also appeared in several of his stage comedies.

Prandi died on 8 June 1961 at the Ciancarelli clinic in Rome after a long illness.

== Filmography ==
- Una famiglia impossibile (1940) – Nerina Bartolla
- L'allegro fantasma (1941) – Lilli
- Neapolitans in Milan (1953) – narrator
