= We Two Alone =

- Directed by: Marcello Marchesi; Vittorio Metz; Marino Girolami
- Written by: Marcello Marchesi; Vittorio Metz
- Starring: Walter Chiari
- Cinematography: Mario Montuori
- Edited by: Franco Fraticelli
- Music by: Nino Rota
- Release date: 1952
- Country: Italy
- Language: Italian

Noi due soli (We Two Alone) is a 1952 Italian comedy film directed by Marcello Marchesi, Vittorio Metz and Marino Girolami.

== Cast ==
- Walter Chiari as Walter
- Hélène Rémy as Gina
- Carlo Campanini as Carlo
- Anna Campori as Miss Fillide
- Raimondo Vianello as Vallini
- Enrico Viarisio as President
- Gianrico Tedeschi as "Muscle"
- Mario Feliciani
- Delia Scala
