= Harlem (film) =

1943 film directed by Carmine Gallone

- Directed by: Carmine Gallone
- Written by: Giuseppe Achille (novel); Sergio Amidei; Emilio Cecchi; Giacomo De Benedetti; Angelo Guidi; Pietro Petroselli
- Starring: Massimo Girotti; Amedeo Nazzari; Vivi Gioi
- Cinematography: Anchise Brizzi
- Edited by: Renzo Lucidi; Maria Rosada
- Music by: Willy Ferrero
- Production company: Società Italiana Cines
- Distributed by: ENIC
- Release date: 24 April 1943
- Running time: 81 minutes
- Country: Italy
- Language: Italian

Harlem is a 1943 Italian sports crime film directed by Carmine Gallone and starring Massimo Girotti, Amedeo Nazzari and Vivi Gioi. It was shot at the Cinecittà Studios in Rome. The film's sets were designed by the art director Guido Fiorini. The former world heavyweight champion Primo Carnera appears in a small role. It is also known by the alternative title of Knock Out.

It is noted for its anti-Americanism at a time when the two countries were at war. In postwar re-releases, Amedeo's final line was redubbed with a more positive view on life in the United States.

== Synopsis ==
Tommaso Rossi, a young Italian goes to America to visit his elder brother Amedeo who has a business in the construction industry. He is discovered as a talented boxer after getting into a fight with a champion in a restaurant and flooring him. However his elder brother's business is wrecked and he is arrested for a crime he did not commit. Forced to fight in order to raise enough money to bail his brother, Tommaso is then told by a dying Amedeo to return to Italy as the American dream holds nothing for Italian American immigrants.

== Cast ==
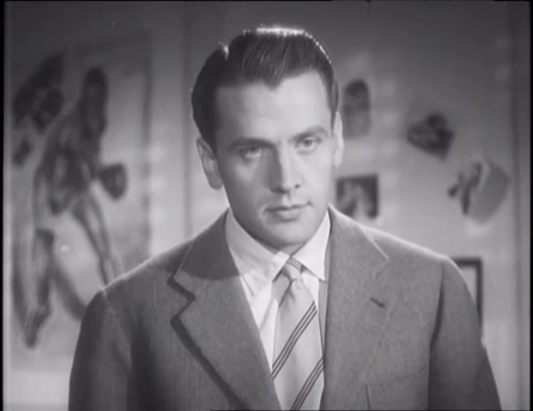
Massimo Girotti as Tommaso Rossi

- Massimo Girotti as Tommaso Rossi
- Amedeo Nazzari as Amedeo Rossi
- Vivi Gioi as Muriel
- Elisa Cegani as La donna del gangster
- Osvaldo Valenti as Chris Sherman
- Erminio Spalla as Franckie Battaglia, l'allenatore
- Enrico Glori as Ben Farrell
- Lodovico Longo: as Charlie Lamb, a black boxer
- Gianni Musy as Il piccolo Tony Rossi
- Enrico Viarisio as Pat
- Luigi Almirante as Barney Palmer
- Greta Gonda as Milena Zvetcovic
- Giuseppe Porelli as Il duca di Solimena
- Mino Doro as Bill Black
- Giovanni Grasso as Guardascione
- Luigi Pavese as Joe Smith
- Guglielmo Sinaz as Sinclair Roswell
- Primo Carnera as Se stesso

== Bibliography ==
- Peter Bondanella & Federico Pacchioni. A History of Italian Cinema. Bloomsbury Publishing, 2017.
