= Totò Mignone =

Italian dancer and actor (1906–1993)

- Born: Ottone Mignone; 8 February 1906; Alessandria, Piedmont, Kingdom of Italy
- Died: 1 January 1993 (aged 86); Rome, Lazio, Italy
- Occupations: Actor, dancer
- Years active: 1932–1986 (film)
- Relatives: Carla "Milly" Mignone (sister)

Ottone "Totò" Mignone (8 February 1906 – 1 January 1993) was an Italian dancer and actor of stage and film. He was the elder brother of the actress and singer Milly.

== Selected filmography ==
- Five to Nil (1932)
- The Taming of the Shrew (1942)
- The Woman of Sin (1942)
- A Little Wife (1943)
- Anything for a Song (1943)
- The Last Wagon (1943)
- The Two Orphans (1947)
- Cab Number 13 (1948)
- Toto Tours Italy (1948)
- The Firemen of Viggiu (1949)
- Adam and Eve (1949)
- Totò Tarzan (1950)
- 47 morto che parla (1950)
- Toto the Third Man (1951)
- Sardinian Vendetta (1952)
- Neapolitan Turk (1953)
- An American in Rome (1954)
- Toto, Peppino and the Fanatics (1958)
- How to Kill 400 Duponts (1967)
- Bloody Friday (1972)
- Ginger and Fred (1986)
