= The Count of Brechard =

1938 film directed by Mario Bonnard

- Directed by: Mario Bonnard
- Written by: Sergio Amidei; Mario Bonnard; Amedeo Castellazzi; Giovacchino Forzano (play); Ivo Perilli; Aldo Vergano
- Produced by: Giuseppe Amato
- Starring: Amedeo Nazzari; Luisa Ferida; Ugo Ceseri
- Cinematography: Václav Vích
- Edited by: Eraldo Da Roma
- Music by: Giulio Bonnard
- Production company: Amato Film
- Release date: January 1938
- Running time: 95 minutes
- Country: Italy
- Language: Italian

The Count of Brechard (Italian: Il conte di Brechard) is a 1938 Italian historical drama film directed by Mario Bonnard and starring Amedeo Nazzari, Luisa Ferida, and Ugo Ceseri. It was adapted from the Giovacchino Forzano play. The film's sets were designed by the art director Virgilio Marchi.

== Main cast ==
- Amedeo Nazzari as Francesco di Bréchard
- Luisa Ferida as Maria
- Ugo Ceseri as Pérault
- Camillo Pilotto as Licurgo
- Mario Ferrari as Socrate
- Maria Donati as Euterpe
- Romano Calò as Gastel
- Carlo Tamberlani as Carlo, Visconte di Bréchard
- Armando Migliari as Roberto
- Franco Coop as Matteo
- Tina Lattanzi as Queen Marie Antoinette
- Febo Mari as Richard
- Giorgio Capecchi as Gerly
- Aristide Garbini as Grange
- Floriana Morresi as The countess

== Bibliography ==
- Michael Klossner. The Europe of 1500-1815 on Film and Television: A Worldwide Filmography of Over 2550 Works, 1895 Through 2000. McFarland & Company, 2002.
