= Vanity (1947 film) =

- Film poster
- Directed by: Giorgio Pastina
- Written by: Carlo Bertolazzi (play); Giorgio Pastina
- Starring: Walter Chiari; Liliana Laine; Dina Galli; Ruggero Ruggeri
- Cinematography: Giuseppe La Torre
- Music by: Nino Rota
- Production company: Fauno Film
- Distributed by: Generalcine
- Release date: 15 May 1947
- Country: Italy
- Language: Italian

Vanity (Italian: Vanità) is a 1947 Italian historical melodrama film directed by Giorgio Pastina and starring Walter Chiari, Liliana Laine and Dina Galli. The film is based on a play by Carlo Bertolazzi. Chiari was awarded a Nastro d'Argento for best debut performance. It was made at the Icet Studios in Milan.

The film is set in nineteenth century Milan.

== Cast ==
- Walter Chiari as Enrico Scotti
- Liliana Laine as Bianca
- Dina Galli as Carolina
- Otello Toso as Perletti
- Ruggero Ruggeri as the priest
- Luigi Almirante as Anselmo
- Giovanni Barrella as Murzacchi
- Nino Besozzi
- Elvira Bonecchi
- Paolo Bonecchi
- Federico Collino
- Mirko Ellis
- Mario Ferrari
- Mia Galliani
- Leda Illi
- Alda Mangini
- Checco Rissone
- Adriana Sivieri
