= The Peddler and the Lady =

1943 Italian film by Mario Bonnard

- Directed by: Mario Bonnard
- Written by: Marino Girolami; Aldo Fabrizi; Federico Fellini; Piero Tellini; Mario Bonnard
- Produced by: Giuseppe Amato
- Starring: Caterina Boratto; Cristiano Cristiani; Peppino De Filippo; Aldo Fabrizi
- Cinematography: Giuseppe La Torre
- Edited by: Gino Talamo
- Music by: Giulio Bonnard
- Production company: Società Italiana Cines
- Distributed by: ENIC
- Release date: 24 June 1943
- Running time: 95 minutes
- Country: Italy
- Language: Italian

The Peddler and the Lady (Italian title: Campo de' fiori) is a 1943 Italian comedy film directed by Mario Bonnard and starring Aldo Fabrizi, Caterina Boratto and Anna Magnani.

== Plot ==
Much of the film is set on the Campo de' Fiori in Rome where Elide, a greengrocer, is in love with a fishmonger who works nearby, but he is more interested in another woman.

== Cast ==
- Aldo Fabrizi as Peppino Corradini
- Caterina Boratto as Elsa Bianchini
- Anna Magnani as Elide
- Peppino De Filippo as Aurelio
- Cristiano Cristiani as Il piccolo Carletto
- Olga Solbelli as Olga
- Rina Franchetti as Rosa, la domestica di Olga
- Guglielmo Barnabò as Il signore grasso sul treno
- Ciro Berardi as Sor Eugenio
- Giulio Calì as L'uomo che chiede le alicette
- Lia Campomori as La suora del carcere
- Olga Capri as Peppa, la portiera
- Olga Vittoria Gentilli as Leila, la giocatrice al tavolo di baccarat
- Gorella Gori as La balia
- Luana Lori as La domestica venuta al mercato
- Enrico Luzi as Un giocatore al tavolo di baccarat
- Alfredo Martinelli as Un giocatore al tavolo di baccarat
- Guido Morisi as Giorgio
- Pina Piovani as Una popolana ai mercanti generali
- Checco Rissone as Giovanni
- Gioconda Stari as La domestica del nuovo appartamento
- Gianrico Tedeschi as Un giocatore al tavolo di baccarat
- Saro Urzì

== Bibliography ==
- Reich, Jacqueline & Garofalo, Piero. Re-viewing Fascism: Italian Cinema, 1922-1943. Indiana University Press, 2002.
