= Liliana Laine =

French actress (born 1923)

- Born: 1923; Vitry-le-François, Marne, France
- Died: 1999
- Occupation: Actress
- Years active: 1942–1948 (film)

Liliana Laine (1923–1999) was a French film actress known for her roles in Italian cinema during the 1940s. She appeared in thirteen productions including the 1947 historical film Vanity.

== Selected filmography ==
- My Widow and I (1945)
- What a Distinguished Family (1945)
- The Models of Margutta (1946)
- Bullet for Stefano (1947)
- Vanity (1947)

== Bibliography ==
- Goble, Alan. The Complete Index to Literary Sources in Film. Walter de Gruyter, 1999.
