= Neapolitans in Milan =

- Directed by: Eduardo De Filippo
- Written by: Eduardo De Filippo; Age & Scarpelli
- Produced by: Virtus Film
- Starring: Eduardo De Filippo, Anna Maria Ferrero, Frank Latimore
- Cinematography: Leonida Barboni
- Music by: Renzo Rossellini
- Distributed by: Virtus Film
- Release date: 1953
- Running time: 98 min
- Country: Italy
- Language: Italian

Napoletani a Milano (internationally released as Neapolitans in Milan) is a 1953 Italian comedy film directed by Eduardo De Filippo. It entered the competition at the 14th Venice International Film Festival. In 2008, the film was included on the Italian Ministry of Cultural Heritage’s 100 Italian films to be saved, a list of 100 films that "have changed the collective memory of the country between 1942 and 1978."

== Cast ==
- Eduardo De Filippo: Salvatore Aianello
- Anna Maria Ferrero: Nannina
- Tina Castigliano: Irene
- Frank Latimore: Enrico
- Baldassarre Caruso: Antonio Capasso
- Thea Prandi: narrator
- Laura Gore: Rosetta
- Vittorio Sanipoli: Giovanni
- Luigi Russo: Vincenzino
- Renata Corridi: Secretary
- Sonia Holm: Mrs. Vittorini
