= The Last of the Bergeracs =

- Directed by: Gennaro Righelli
- Written by: Gaetano Campanile-Mancini (novel); Gennaro Righelli
- Produced by: Fabio Franchini
- Starring: Ketty Maya; Arturo Falconi; Italia Almirante-Manzini
- Cinematography: Carlo Montuori
- Edited by: Mario Costa
- Music by: Amedeo Escobar
- Production company: Faro Film
- Distributed by: Cines-Pittaluga
- Release date: 1934
- Running time: 71 minutes
- Country: Italy
- Language: Italian

The Last of the Bergeracs (Italian: L'ultimo dei Bergerac) is a 1934 Italian comedy film directed by Gennaro Righelli and starring Ketty Maya, Arturo Falconi and Italia Almirante-Manzini.

== Cast ==
- Ketty Maya as La contessina
- Arturo Falconi as Il maggiordomo
- Italia Almirante-Manzini as La colonella
- Livio Pavanelli as Il colonello
- Fosco Giachetti as Il tenente
- Franco Coop as Il soldato del naso ciranesco
- Maria Letizia Celli as La castellana
- Mario Steni as Un giovane ufficiale
- Gina Grappasonni
- Achille Majeroni
- Armando Migliari
- Ermanno Roveri
- Giotto Tempestini
- Vittorio Tettoni
- Amelia Amorosi
- Matilde Casagrande
- Andrea Checchi
- Rolando Costantino
- Giorgio Covi
- Luigi Erminio D'Olivo
- Dino Di Luca
- Carlo Duse
- Leo Garavaglia
- Dante Majeroni

== Bibliography ==
- Goble, Alan. The Complete Index to Literary Sources in Film. Walter de Gruyter, 1999.
