= Una famiglia impossibile =

1940 film by Carlo Ludovico Bragaglia

- Directed by: Carlo Ludovico Bragaglia
- Written by: Cesare Zavattini; Aldo De Benedetti
- Story by: Cesare Zavattini
- Produced by: Giuseppe Amato
- Starring: Armando Falconi; Pina Renzi; María Mercader
- Cinematography: Anchise Brizzi
- Music by: Cesare A. Bixio; Giovanni D'Anzi; Luigi Pagano
- Release date: 1940
- Language: Italian

Una famiglia impossibile (i.e. "An Impossible Family") is a 1940 Italian "white-telephones" comedy film directed by Carlo Ludovico Bragaglia and starring Armando Falconi, Pina Renzi and María Mercader.

== Plot ==
A wealthy young woman falls in love with a radio singer without ever having seen him. He forces his eccentric family (a forgetful father, a mother with delusions of grandeur, three sisters with a passion for singing, and another who cares for abandoned children) to go to the EIAR headquarters to meet him.

== Cast ==
- Armando Falconi as Giovanni Bartolla
- Pina Renzi as Cesira Bartolla
- María Mercader as Edvige Bartolla
- Clely Fiamma as Anna Bartolla
- Isa Bellini as Marina Bartolla
- Thea Prandi as Nerina Bartolla
- Wilma Mangini as Malvina Bartolla
- Sergio Tofano as The Butler
- Alberto Rabagliati as The Radio Singer
- Arturo Bragaglia as The Poor Relative
- Stefano Sibaldi as The Director
- Paolo Stoppa
- Pippo Barzizza
- Nunzio Filogamo
