= Arturo Falconi =

Italian actor

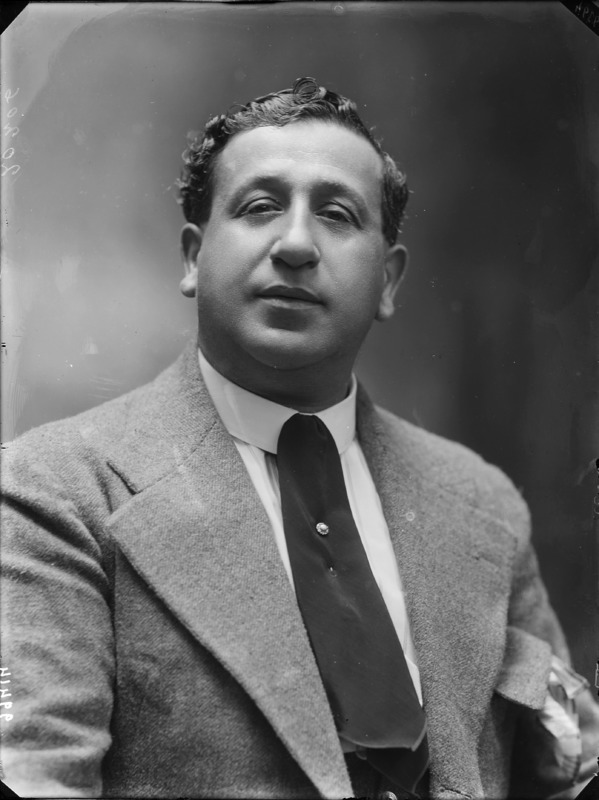
- Born: 28 December 1867; Naples, Campania, Italy
- Died: 10 November 1934 (aged 66); Turin, Piedmont, Italy
- Occupation: Actor
- Years active: 1916–1935 (film)

Arturo Falconi (1867–1934) was an Italian stage and film actor. He was the brother of the actor Armando Falconi and uncle of the director Dino Falconi.

== Selected filmography ==
- The Gift of the Morning (1932)
- Zaganella and the Cavalier (1932)
- Everybody's Secretary (1933)
- The Last of the Bergeracs (1934)
- Kiki (1934)
- The Three-Cornered Hat (1935)

== Bibliography ==
- Goble, Alan. The Complete Index to Literary Sources in Film. Walter de Gruyter, 1999.
