= Franco Coop =

Italian actor (1891–1962)

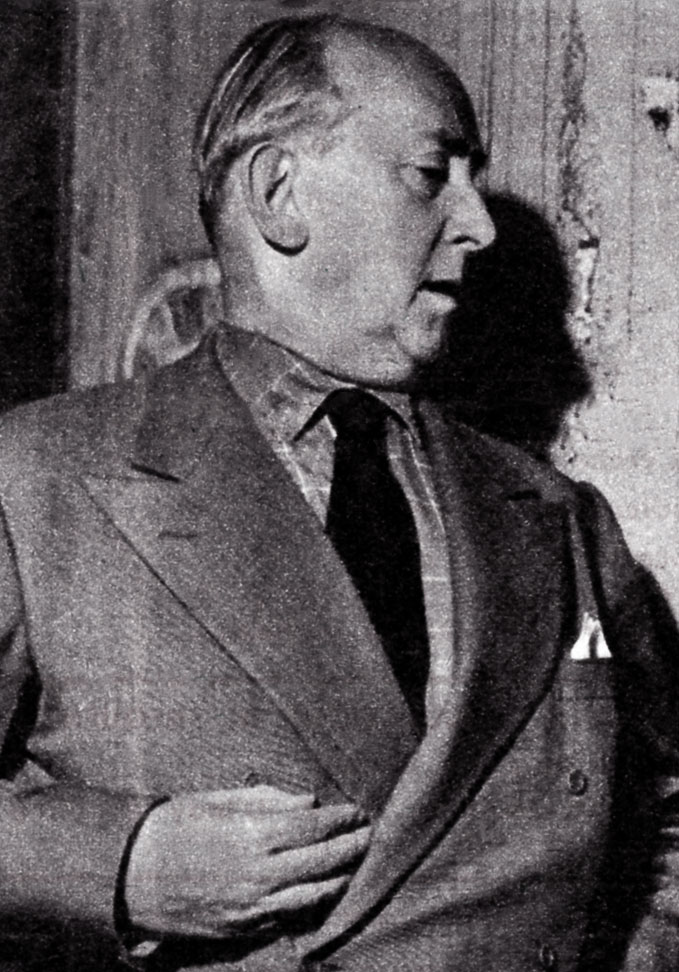
- Born: 27 September 1891; Naples, Italy
- Died: 27 March 1962 (aged 70); Rome, Italy
- Occupation: Actor
- Years active: 1931-1960

Franco Coop (27 September 1891 – 27 March 1962), was an Italian film actor. He appeared in 65 films between 1931 and 1960. He was born in Naples, Italy and died in Rome, Italy.

== Selected filmography ==
- Before the Jury (1931)
- Mother Earth (1931)
- Five to Nil (1932)
- Everybody's Secretary (1933)
- Nini Falpala (1933)
- My Little One (1933)
- Everybody's Woman (1934)
- The Last of the Bergeracs (1934)
- Lady of Paradise (1934)
- Aldebaran (1935)
- Those Two (1935)
- Sette giorni all'altro mondo (1936)
- Lohengrin (1936)
- The Amnesiac (1936)
- I'll Give a Million (1936)
- The Last Days of Pompeo (1937)
- Hands Off Me! (1937)
- The Three Wishes (1937)
- The Carnival Is Here Again (1937)
- The Count of Brechard (1938)
- The Hotel of the Absent (1939)
- Saint John, the Beheaded (1940)
- Captain Fracasse (1940)
- Don Pasquale (1940)
- The King's Jester (1941)
- The Man on the Street (1941)
- The Happy Ghost (1941)
- Jealousy (1942)
- Without a Woman (1943)
- The Ways of Sin (1946)
- Baron Carlo Mazza (1948)
- Night Taxi (1950)
- The Transporter (1950)
- That Ghost of My Husband (1950)
- Tragic Spell (1951)
- Cavalcade of Song (1953)
- The Art of Getting Along (1954)
- Non perdiamo la testa (1959)
