= Concert of Intrigue =

1954 film directed by Mario Bonnard

- Directed by: Mario Bonnard
- Starring: Brigitte Bardot
- Cinematography: Tonino Delli Colli
- Music by: Giulio Bonnard
- Distributed by: Howco
- Release date: 4 September 1954
- Language: Italian

Concert of Intrigue (Italian: Tradita) is a 1954 Italian historical melodrama film directed by Mario Bonnard and starring Brigitte Bardot. It recorded admissions of 959,000 in France.

== Plot ==
During the First World War, Enrico and Franco, two brothers of the noble Alberti family of Rovereto, found themselves on opposite sides: the older Enrico, physically handicapped, is pro-Austrian while the younger Franco is a fervent patriot who thanks to his career as a pianist can move freely between the two countries. Despite a relationship with Elisabetta Tabor, a Polish singer, Franco decides to marry the young Anna, the niece of a police lieutenant, but Enrico is also interested in her. Henry driven by jealousy, backed by Elisabetta who is actually a spy of the Austrians, they convince his brother that his arrest is imminent and he must flee to Italy where he joins the army and returns to fight in the Rovereto area and finds Anna who in the meanwhile she gave birth to a baby boy. The woman hides her husband but once again her brother Enrico discovers him and denounces him only to repent himself accusing himself of being a saboteur and replacing him in the death sentence. After the war Franco comes out of prison and reunites with Anna and her son.

== Cast ==
- Lucia Bosè as Elisabeth Tatabor
- Pierre Cressoy as Franco Alberti
- Brigitte Bardot as Anna
- Giorgio Albertazzi as Count Enrico Alberti
- Camillo Pilotto as Don Eugenio
- Henri Vidon as Lt. Schumann
- Tonio Selwart as General Renner
- Diana Lante as Countess Eleonora Alberti
- Vera Carmi as Nurse
