= Mario Bonnard =

Italian actor and film director

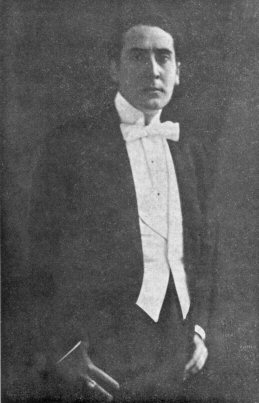
Mario Bonnard

Mario Bonnard (24 December 1889 – 22 March 1965) was an Italian actor and film director.

== Career ==
Bonnard was born and died in Rome. He began his cinematic career as an actor becoming a popular romantic lead in numerous silent films made before World War I. In 1917, he ventured into film directing for the first time. Before the arrival of sound films he worked for a period in Germany in films directed by Luis Trenker.

Back in Italy in 1932, he became a prolific director working with the major stars of the time as: Assia Noris, Elsa Merlini, Amedeo Nazzari, and Luisa Ferida. Il feroce Saladino (1937) was the most popular of his films of the 1930s.

During the war he continued to work. In the post World War II period his films, ranging from comedies to period dramas enjoyed much success. However, today he's no longer well known. One of his last films was The Last Days of Pompeii (1959). An illness made him leave production early, so the film was completed by Sergio Leone.

His brother was the composer Giulio Bonnard, who frequently wrote film scores for Mario's productions.

== Selected filmography ==
- Floretta and Patapon (1913)
- Love Everlasting (1913)
- Titanic (1915)
- The Betrothed (1923)
- The Circus of Life (1926)
- The Golden Abyss (1927)
- Struggle for the Matterhorn (1928)
- Theatre (1928)
- The Sinner (1928)
- The Call of the North (1929)
- Call at Midnight (1929)
- The Son of the White Mountain (1930)
- Five to Nil (1932)
- No Women (1932)
- Three Lucky Fools (1933)
- The Missing Treaty (1933)
- The Wedding March (1934)
- Territorial Militia (1935)
- Adam's Tree (1936)
- Thirty Seconds of Love (1936)
- The Ferocious Saladin (1937)
- The Count of Brechard (1938)
- I, His Father (1939)
- Frenzy (1939)
- Father For a Night (1939)
- The King's Jester (1941)
- Marco Visconti (1941)
- Before the Postman (1942)
- The Peddler and the Lady (1943)
- Romulus and the Sabines (1945)
- Farewell, My Beautiful Naples (1946)
- City of Pain (1948)
- Margaret of Cortona (1950)
- The Vow (1950)
- Stasera sciopero (1951)
- The Last Sentence (1951)
- Torment of the Past (1952)
- I figli non si vendono (1952)
- Frine, Courtesan of Orient (1953)
- Concert of Intrigue (1954)
- They Stole a Tram (1954)
- La ladra (1955)
- Allow Me, Daddy! (1956)
- Slave Women of Corinth (1958)
- The Last Days of Pompeii (1959)
- Gastone (1960)
- Rome 1585 (1961)
