= I Love You Only =

1935 film

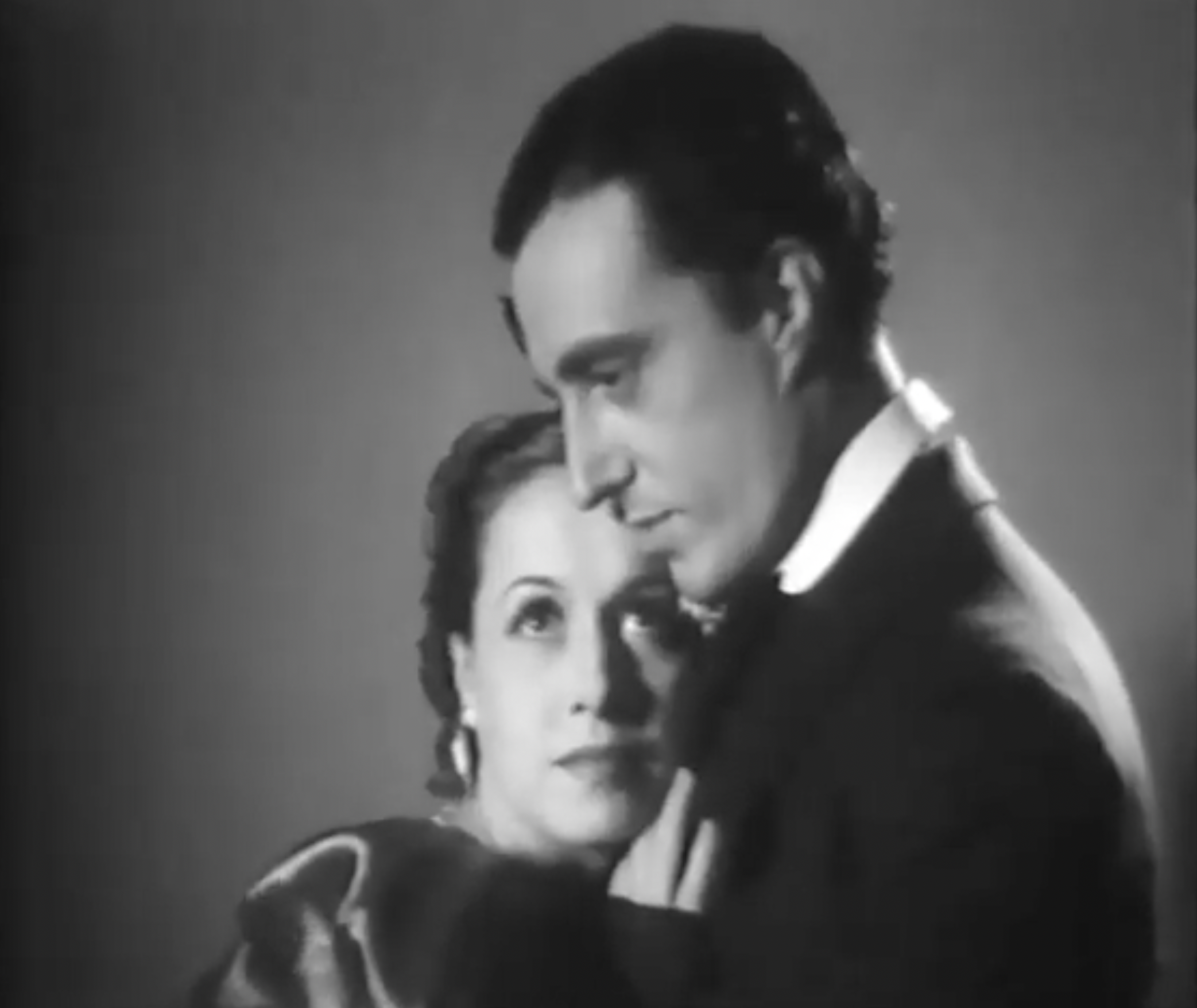
- Milly and De Sica in a film scene
- Directed by: Mario Mattoli
- Written by: Nando Vitali (play); Giacomo Gentilomo
- Produced by: Fabio Franchi
- Starring: Milly; Vittorio De Sica; Giuditta Rissone
- Cinematography: Carlo Montuori
- Edited by: Giacomo Gentilomo
- Music by: Salvatore Allegra
- Production company: Tiberia Film
- Distributed by: Grandi Film
- Release date: 1935
- Running time: 79 minutes
- Country: Italy
- Language: Italian

I Love You Only (Italian: Amo te sola) is a 1935 Italian historical drama film directed by Mario Mattoli and starring Milly, Vittorio De Sica and Giuditta Rissone.

It was shot at the Cines Studios in Rome. The film's sets were designed by the art director Gastone Medin.

== Synopsis ==
The film is set in Florence in 1848, then the capital of the Grand Duchy of Tuscany in the era before Italian unification. A young Neapolitan composer arrives in the city and becomes involved with Italian patriots, planning to take part in the Revolutions that year.

== Cast ==
- Milly as Grace
- Vittorio De Sica as Prof. Giovanni Agano
- Enrico Viarisio as Avvocato Piccoli
- Giuditta Rissone as Aunt Giuditta
- Renato Cialente as Baron
- Ada Dondini as Carlotta
- Giovanni Barrella as Cavaliere Rivolta
- Enzo Biliotti as Opera Manager
- Carlo Ninchi as Cesare Baldi
- Guglielmo Sinaz
- Emilio Cigoli

== Bibliography ==
- Goble, Alan. The Complete Index to Literary Sources in Film. Walter de Gruyter, 1999.
- Mancini, Elaine. Struggles of the Italian Film Industry During Fascism, 1930-1935. UMI Research Press, 1985.
