= Full Speed (1934 film) =

1934 film

- Directed by: Mario Mattoli
- Written by: Mario Mattoli
- Produced by: Angelo Besozzi
- Starring: Vittorio De Sica; Milly; Camillo Pilotto
- Cinematography: Carlo Montuori
- Edited by: Giacomo Gentilomo
- Music by: Vittorio Mascheroni; Virgilio Ripa
- Production company: Za-Bum Films
- Distributed by: Za-Bum Films
- Release date: 31 December 1934
- Running time: 78 minutes
- Country: Italy
- Language: Italian

Full Speed (Italian: Tempo massimo) is a 1934 Italian comedy film directed by Mario Mattoli and starring Vittorio De Sica, Milly and Camillo Pilotto. It was shot at the Cines Studios in Rome. The film's sets were designed by the art director Gastone Medin.

== Synopsis ==
A mild-mannered young Professor's quiet life in the country is turned upside down one day when, while out fishing, Dora lands in the water beside him having parachuted out of a plane. Dora is a vivacious party girl, who quickly disrupts the Professor's stuffy household. His growing attraction to her is tempered by the fact that she is due to be married soon.

== Main cast ==
- Vittorio De Sica as Giacomo
- Milly as Dora Sandri
- Camillo Pilotto as Maggiordomo
- Enrico Viarisio as Alfredo Martinelli
- Amelia Chellini as Zia Agata
- Anna Magnani as Emilia
- Nerio Bernardi as Il principe Huerta - detto Bob
- Ermanno Roveri as Jack
- Giulio Donadio as Rossi - l'usuraio

== Bibliography ==
- Moliterno, Gino. The A to Z of Italian Cinema. Scarecrow Press, 2009.
