= The Adventures of Sybil Brent =

1925 film directed by Carl Froelich

- Directed by: Carl Froelich
- Written by: Hugo Bettauer (novel); Robert Liebmann; Walter Supper
- Produced by: Carl Froelich; Henny Porten; Wilhelm von Kaufmann
- Starring: Henny Porten; Memo Benassi; Rudolf Biebrach
- Cinematography: Axel Graatkjær
- Music by: Willy Schmidt-Gentner
- Production company: Henny Porten-Froelich-Produktion
- Distributed by: Filmhaus Bruckmann
- Release date: 31 August 1925
- Running time: 86 minutes
- Country: Germany
- Languages: Silent; German intertitles

The Adventures of Sybil Brent (German: Das Abenteuer der Sibylle Brant) is a 1925 German silent comedy crime film directed by Carl Froelich and starring Henny Porten, Memo Benassi and Rudolf Biebrach. It was shot at the EFA Studios in Berlin. The film's sets were designed by the art director Franz Schroedter.

== Cast ==
- Henny Porten as Sibylle Brant, Schauspielerin
- Memo Benassi as Theo Hartwig, Schriftsteller
- Rudolf Biebrach as Aribert Brant, ihr Vater
- Harald Paulsen as Kriminalkommissar Krenke
- Henry Stuart as Kriminalkommissar Dengern
- Adolf E. Licho as Pötter, Direktor des Theatrs
- Maria Forescu as Sonja Rubenstein, Pianistin
- Sophie Pagay
- Mario Cusmich
- Carl Ebert

== Bibliography ==
- Grange, William (2008). Cultural Chronicle of the Weimar Republic. Lanham, MD: Scarecrow Press. ISBN 978-0-8108-5967-8.
