= Giulio Bonnard =

Italian composer

- Born: 21 June 1885; Rome, Lazio, Italy
- Died: 29 February 1972 (aged 86); Rome, Lazio, Italy
- Occupation: Composer
- Years active: 1932–1961 (film)

Giulio Bonnard (21 June 1885 – 29 February 1972) was an Italian composer of film scores. He often worked on films directed by his brother Mario Bonnard.

== Selected filmography ==
- Five to Nil (1932)
- Three Lucky Fools (1933)
- The Missing Treaty (1933)
- Stadium (1934)
- The Wedding March (1934)
- Territorial Militia (1935)
- Thirty Seconds of Love (1936)
- The Ferocious Saladin (1937)
- The Last Days of Pompeo (1937)
- The Count of Brechard (1938)
- A Lady Did It (1938)
- I, His Father (1939)
- Frenzy (1939)
- Father For a Night (1939)
- The King's Jester (1941)
- Marco Visconti (1941)
- The Prisoner of Santa Cruz (1941)
- Before the Postman (1942)
- After Casanova's Fashion (1942)
- The Peddler and the Lady (1943)
- What a Distinguished Family (1945)
- Romulus and the Sabines (1945)
- City of Pain (1948)
- The Vow (1950)
- Margaret of Cortona (1950)
- The Last Sentence (1951)
- I figli non si vendono (1952)
- Frine, Courtesan of Orient (1953)
- Concert of Intrigue (1954)
- Allow Me, Daddy! (1956)

== Bibliography ==
- Piero Pruzzo & Enrico Lancia. Amedeo Nazzari. Gremese Editore, 1983.
