= La zia smemorata =

- Directed by: Ladislao Vajda
- Written by: Cesare Meano; Ladislao Vajda; Andrea Di Robilant; Guglielmo Emanuel
- Story by: Amedeo Castellazzi
- Starring: Dina Galli; Alanova; Nelly Corradi; Osvaldo Valenti
- Cinematography: Alberto Fusi
- Music by: Eldo Di Lazzaro
- Release date: 1940
- Language: Italian

La zia smemorata (i.e. "The Amnesiac Aunt") is a 1940 Italian "white-telephones" comedy film directed by Ladislao Vajda and starring Dina Galli.

== Plot ==
Jealous of his girlfriend, the lawyer Alberto Moretti is convinced that she spent a couple of days in a high mountain refuge in the company of the engineer Paolo Ravelli, a friend of the lawyer. However, it is only a misunderstanding and therefore, to clarify his position and restore the truth, the engineer proposes to his friend and his girlfriend to find the girl who in the shelter had passed herself off as the lawyer's girlfriend. However, an intrusive and bizarre aunt joins the party who, by meddling in everything, causes further misunderstandings and misunderstandings to no end. However, the group manages to discover that the mysterious girl was not the lawyer's girlfriend at all. The two slandered youths managed to re-establish the truth but, by dating, they also fell in love with each other. So in the end, it is also the lawyer, jealous and suspicious, who suffers the damage.

== Cast ==
- Dina Galli as Aunt Giulia
- Alanova as Clara
- Nelly Corradi as Maria Giusti
- Osvaldo Valenti as Paolo Rovelli
- Carlo Campanini as Alberto Moretti
- Umberto Sacripante as Professor Mannelli
- Claudio Ermelli as Taddeo
- Guido Notari as The Police Commissioner
- Luigi Erminio D'Olivo as The Secretary
- Renato Malavasi as The Porter
- Giulio Battiferri as The Waiter
- Pina Piovani as Clara's Maid
