= Nini Falpala =

- Directed by: Amleto Palermi
- Written by: Augusto Novelli (play); Alessandro De Stefani; Luigi Bonelli
- Produced by: Giulio Manenti
- Starring: Dina Galli; Renzo Ricci; Elsa De Giorgi
- Cinematography: Arturo Gallea
- Edited by: Amleto Palermi
- Music by: Pier Giorgio Redi
- Production company: Manenti Film
- Distributed by: Manenti Film
- Release date: October 1933
- Running time: 84 minutes
- Country: Italy
- Language: Italian

Ninì Falpalà is a 1933 Italian "white-telephones" comedy film directed by Amleto Palermi and starring Dina Galli, Renzo Ricci and Elsa De Giorgi. It is based on a play by Augusto Novelli, and was shot at the Caesar Film studios in Rome.

== Synopsis ==
Two elderly variety actors, struggling for work, decide to attract attention by staging the suicide of one of them.

== Cast ==
- Dina Galli as Ninì Falpalà
- Renzo Ricci as Leone
- Hilda Springher as Vane
- Elsa De Giorgi as La figlia di Torrazza
- Franco Coop as Fanfara
- Aristide Baghetti as Torrazza
- Enzo Gainotti
- Rocco D'Assunta
- Claudio Ermelli
- Mario Gallina

== Bibliography ==
- Roberto Chiti & Roberto Poppi. I film: Tutti i film italiani dal 1930 al 1944. Gremese Editore, 2005.
