= Alone at Last (film) =

1942 film

- Directed by: Giacomo Gentilomo
- Written by: Mino Caudana
- Produced by: Mario Borghi
- Starring: Enrico Viarisio; María Mercader; Maurizio D'Ancora
- Cinematography: Giuseppe La Torre
- Edited by: Renzo Lucidi
- Music by: Ulisse Siciliani
- Production companies: Industria Cinematografica Italiana; Viralba Film
- Distributed by: Cine Tirrenia
- Release date: 17 March 1942
- Running time: 88 minutes
- Country: Italy
- Language: Italian

Alone at Last (Italian: Finalmente soli) is a 1942 Italian period comedy film directed by Giacomo Gentilomo, starring Enrico Viarisio, María Mercader and Maurizio D'Ancora. It featured a supporting role for the future star Anna Magnani. It was shot at the Pisorno Studios in Tirrenia. The film's sets were designed by the art director Veniero Colasanti.

== Synopsis ==
The story takes place around the turn of the twentieth century. To secure an inheritance from his aunt, a young man has to pretend to be engaged. Complications ensue when his aunt demands to see his fiancée and he asks his friend to lend him his future bride to pull off the deception.

== Cast ==
- Enrico Viarisio as Benedetto Bodengo
- María Mercader as Angela
- Maurizio D'Ancora as Giulio De Ritis
- Anna Magnani as Ninetta alias "Lulù"
- Virgilio Riento as Il cugino Michele
- Checco Rissone as Paolo
- Ernesto Almirante as Il professore Ippolito Mariani
- Jone Morino as La signora Mariani
- Adriana Sivieri as Lilli
- Nicolás D. Perchicot as Adalberto
- Velia Galvani as Zia Aurora
- Maria Dominiani as Lea
- Lia Corelli as Cesarina
- Pina Gallini as La portinaia

== Bibliography ==
- De Giusti, Luciano. Giacomo Gentilomo, cineasta popolare. Kaplan, 2008.
- Hochkofler, Matilde. Anna Magnani. Gremese Editore, 2001.
- Whittaker, Tom & Wright, Sarah (ed.) Locating the Voice in Film: Critical Approaches and Global Practices. Oxford University Press, 2017.
