= Frenzy (1939 film) =

- Spanish poster
- Directed by: Mario Bonnard
- Written by: Oreste Biancoli (play; Mario Bonnard; Dino Falconi (play)
- Starring: Dina Galli; Antonio Gandusio; Betty Stockfeld
- Cinematography: Carlo Montuori
- Edited by: Gisa Radicchi Levi
- Music by: Giulio Bonnard
- Production company: Amato Film
- Distributed by: Euro International Film
- Release date: 3 November 1939
- Running time: 85 minutes
- Country: Italy
- Language: Italian

Frenzy (Italian: Frenesia) is a 1939 Italian comedy film directed by Mario Bonnard and starring Dina Galli, Antonio Gandusio and Betty Stockfeld.

It was shot at Cinecittà Studios in Rome. The film's sets were designed by the art director Gastone Medin.

== Cast ==
- Dina Galli as Marta
- Antonio Gandusio as Stefano
- Betty Stockfeld as Maud
- Vivi Gioi as Daniela
- Titina De Filippo as Carolina
- Osvaldo Valenti as Sigfrido
- Paolo Stoppa as Bobby
- Giulio Stival as Giacomo
- Ky Duyen as Sam Lee
- Stefano Sibaldi as Il poeta
- Fernando Simbolotti as Il maggiordomo

== Bibliography ==
- Goble, Alan. The Complete Index to Literary Sources in Film. Walter de Gruyter, 1999.
