= Three Lucky Fools =

1933 French-Italian comedy film by Mario Bonnard

- Directed by: Mario Bonnard
- Written by: William Aguet; Michele Galdieri; Mario Bonnard
- Produced by: Seymour Nebenzal; Giuseppe Amato
- Starring: Tito Schipa; Eduardo De Filippo; Fred Pasquali; Peppino De Filippo
- Cinematography: Ferdinando Martini; Giovanni Vitrotti
- Edited by: Mario Bonnard
- Music by: Giulio Bonnard; Dan Caslar; Umberto Mancini
- Production companies: Caesar Film; Prima Film
- Distributed by: Prima Film
- Release date: 2 April 1933
- Running time: 70 minutes
- Countries: France; Italy
- Language: Italian

Three Lucky Fools (Italian: Tre uomini in frack) is a 1933 French-Italian comedy film directed by Mario Bonnard and starring Tito Schipa, Eduardo De Filippo, and Fred Pasquali. It marked the film debut of Assia Noris, who went on to be a leading Italian star.

It was released in two separate versions, one in French and the other in Italian.

== Cast ==
- Tito Schipa as Il tenore Marcello Palma
- Eduardo De Filippo as Gilberto, l'impresario
- Fred Pasquali as Gilbert
- Peppino De Filippo as Andrea
- Simone Vaudry as Lucy
- Assia Noris as La giovane Americana
- Jeanne Perriat as Mme. Laure
- Jean Gobet as André
- Maria Wronska as Signora Laura, la padrona del tabarin
- Charles Dechamps as Le journaliste
- Milly as Lucia
- Camillo Pilotto as Il giornalista

== General bibliography ==
- Gundle, Stephen. Mussolini's Dream Factory: Film Stardom in Fascist Italy. Berghahn Books, 2013.
