= Enrico Viarisio =

Italian actor (1897–1967)

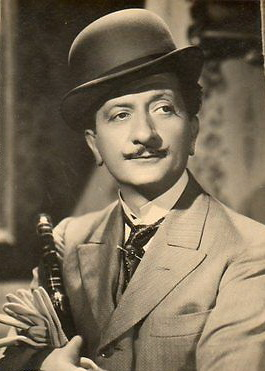
- Viarisio in the 1940s
- Born: 3 December 1897; Turin, Kingdom of Italy
- Died: 1 November 1967 (aged 69); Rome, Italian Republic

Enrico Viarisio (3 December 1897 – 1 November 1967) was an Italian theatre and cinema actor.

== Biography ==
Equipped of a fine and elegant humour, Viarisio was discovered by actress Paola Pezzaglia, who cast him at 19 as a brillante (a comedic role) in her own theatre company.

His career continued with the role of amoroso or male lover in the Carini–Gentili–Betrone theatre company, then passed to Talli–Melato–Betrone, Antonio Gandusio, Dyne Galli, and Nino Besozzi, and the Merlini–Cialente–Bagni company. To raise the company's small profits, Viarisio became the repertory comedian.

Bourgeois audiences appreciated Viarisio's "brilliance" – communicative, effervescent, and comforting – in comedies. In the comedies and white-telephone cinema of the 1930s, Viarisio was a constant figure, with his moustache and his black, shining hair combed to the back. He was the interpreter of various stories adapted to film from the stage, such as Non ti conosco più (1936) by Nunzio Malasomma, L'uomo che sorride (1936) and Questi ragazzi (1937) by Mario Mattoli. Often, he remained in the limits of the genre, but in some cases showed creativity in his performances, keeping them fresh and memorable. This can be seen in films like Il cappello a tre punte (1934) by Mario Camerini, Cavalleria (1936) by Goffredo Alessandrini and Quattro passi fra le nuvole (1942) by Alessandro Blasetti.

During the postwar period he was dedicated above all to the revue, playing opposite Wanda Osiris (Domani è sempre domenica, 1946–47; Si stava meglio domani, 1947–48; Il diavolo custode, 1950–51) and Isa Barzizza (Valentina, 1955). In the 1950s and '60s he lent his impeccable style and his sense of irony to television as well. Still memorable is his participation in Carosello in the spot for food company Alemagna (on the air from 1957 to 1965). He remains known for his signature phrase "Ullalà è una cuccagna!"

== Selected filmography ==
=== Actor ===
- Paprika (1933) - Massimo Bonelli
- The Girl with the Bruise (1933)
- L'impiegata di papà (1933) - Graphologist
- Full Speed (1934) - Alfredo Martinelli
- La provincialina (1934) - Il direttore del teatro
- Kiki (1934) - Napoleone - il domestico
- The Three-Cornered Hat (1934) - Garduna
- The Wedding March (1934)
- Territorial Militia (1935) - Gasparri
- Music in the Square (1936) - Noccolini
- I Love You Only (1936) - Avvocato Piccoli
- Cavalry (1936) - Sottotenente Rolla
- Thirty Seconds of Love (1936) - Tullio Siriani - suo marito
- Sette giorni all'altro mondo (1936) - Cesare Rosselli
- I Don't Know You Anymore (1936) - Paolo Malpieri
- White Amazons (1936) - Simone Gualtieri
- The Man Who Smiles (1936) - Commendator Ercole Piazza
- These Children (1937) - Giangiacomo Pastori
- The Castiglioni Brothers (1937) - Avvocato De Ambrosio
- The Two Misanthropists (1937) - Marcello, parrucchiere
- Gli uomini non sono ingrati (1937) - Aladar Toth
- The Last Days of Pompeo (1937) - Pompeo Quarantini
- Il trionfo dell'amore (1938) - Giangiacomo
- Il destino in tasca (1938) - Camillo Duffignani
- Amicizia (1938) - Roberto Sandi
- La dama bianca (1938) - Savelli
- Duetto vagabondo (1938) - Toto
- At Your Orders, Madame (1939) - Paolo Vernisset
- La bionda sotto chiave (1939) - Pick
- Two Million for a Smile (1939) - Mister Giacomo Perotti / Martino Bo
- I've Lost My Husband! (1939) - Mattia
- L'amore si fa così (1939) - Max Dupont / Narciso Mimosa
- L'eredità in corsa (1939) - Il parucchiere
- Le sorprese del vagone letto (1940) - L'avvocato Marini
- The Hussar Captain (1940) - Varady, ex-capitano degli ussari
- Non mi sposo più (1942) - Barkas
- Alone at Last (1942) - Benedetto Bodengo
- Four Steps in the Clouds (1942) - Magnaschi, il rappresentante farmaceutico
- Annabella's Adventure (1943) - Il padre di Annabella
- Harlem (1943) - Pat
- Sad Loves (1943) - Adriano Rainetti
- Gli assi della risata (1943) - Edoardo 'Dodò' Piccioni (segment "Non chiamarmi Dodò!")
- La maschera e il volto (1943) - L'avvocato Luciano
- Ti conosco, mascherina (1943) - Il barone Liborio Mellifluo
- The Za-Bum Circus (1944) - (segment "Gelosia")
- Ippocampo (1945) - Camillo
- What a Distinguished Family (1945) - Civil State Officer
- Uno tra la folla (1946) - Il capufficio
- Ti ritroverò (1949) - Don Giuseppe
- Little Lady (1949) - Comm. Gegé Lapicella
- I'm in the Revue (1950)
- Prima comunione (1950) - L'uomo del filobus
- Women and Brigands (1950) - Cardinal Ruffo
- The Transporter (1950) - Georges Durand
- The Knight Has Arrived! (1950) - Il Ministro
- Cameriera bella presenza offresi... (1951) - L'amico di Marchetti
- Era lui... sì! sì! (1951) - Dott. Furgoni
- Napoleone (1951)
- Il Microfono è vostro (1951) - commendator Michele Variani
- The Legend of the Piave (1952) - Caporale Mainardi
- Sunday Heroes (1952) - Cerchio - the radio commentator
- Beauties on Motor Scooters (1952) - Carletti
- Noi due soli (1952) - Il presidente
- Siamo tutti inquilini (1953) - Sassi
- Terminal Station (1953) - Cheerful telegram man (uncredited)
- I Vitelloni (1953) - Signor Rubini
- Martin Toccaferro (1953)
- Cavalcade of Song (1953)
- Funniest Show on Earth (1953) - Il presentatore
- It Happened in the Park (1953) - L'ingegnere - cliente di Elvira (segment: Concorso di bellezza)
- Lasciateci in pace (1953)
- Dieci canzoni d'amore da salvare (1953) - Giulio
- A Slice of Life (1954) - Il marito
- Cose da pazzi (1954) - Professor Ruiz
- Neapolitan Carousel (1954) - Spanish tourist
- Pellegrini d'amore (1954) - Constantin
- Milanese in Naples (1954) - Professor Clemente Simoni
- La tua donna (1954)
- We Two Alone (1955) - The Chairman
- The Last Five Minutes (1955) - Francesco, il maggiordomo
- Destination Piovarolo (1955) - De Fassi
- Wives and Obscurities (1956) - Evaristo
- Buongiorno primo amore (1957) - Nardone
- Un amore senza fine (1958)
- The Love Specialist (1958) - Il zio di Piero
- Le bellissime gambe di Sabrina (1958) - Il commendatore
- I Teddy boys della canzone (1960) - Commendator Filippo Amato
- Gli scontenti (1961) - Il sindaco
- Le magnifiche sette (1961) - Il generale Chalette
- Pesci d'oro e bikini d'argento (1961)
- Freddy and the Millionaire (1961) - Arzt
- Fuori la guardia (1961) - Dottore
- Lo smemorato di Collegno (1962) - Il Ministro
- The Shortest Day (1963) - Erede Siciliano (uncredited)
- In ginocchio da te (1964) - Enzo - the Colonel
- Napoleone a Firenze (1964)
- Io uccido, tu uccidi (1965) - Marchese Ciccillo Pozzuoli (segment "La danza delle ore")
- Se non avessi più te (1965) - The Colonel
- Non son degno di te (1965) - Enzo
- Mi vedrai tornare (1966) - Ammiraglio Aleardi
- Perdono (1966) - Car driver
- Don't Sting the Mosquito (1967) - Gavazzeni Scotti
- Stasera mi butto (1967) - Father of Fefè (final film role)

== Sources ==
This article is largely a translation of "Enrico Viarisio Biografia" at Mymovies.it.
