= Giuseppe Porcelli (Baroque painter) =

Italian painter

Giuseppe Porcelli (born 1682) was an Italian Baroque painter, active in Messina.

== Biography ==
Giuseppe was born in Messina and trained in Naples under Francesco Solimena. He painted for the churches of Sant'Antonio Abate and San Filippo de' Bianchi in Messina. He painted a San Pietro Nolasco for the church of San Carlo in Messina. Many of his works were destroyed by earthquakes. or Vico Equense.
