= Willy Ferrero =

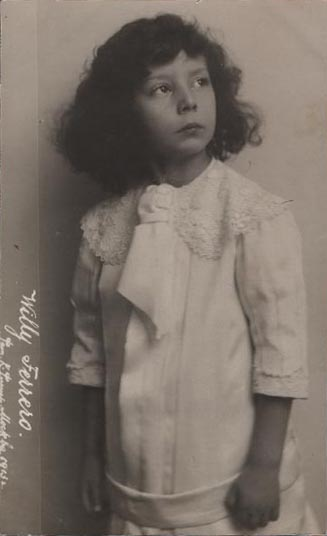
- Ferrero in 1913

Background information
- Born: 21 May 1906; Portland, Maine
- Died: 23 March 1954 (aged 47) Rome, Italy
- Education: Akademie der Musik
- Occupations: Conductor, composer
- Years active: 1912–1954

William Ferrero (21 May 1906–23 March 1954) was an Italian conductor and composer. He became known internationally as a child-prodigy conductor and later pursued a professional conducting career in Italy and abroad. His later repertoire ranged from Baroque and Classical music to contemporary Italian works, French music, and the Russian orchestral repertoire.

== Early life and child-prodigy career ==
Ferrero was born in Portland, Maine, United States, to Vittorio Ferrero and Nerina (Gemma) Moretti, Piedmontese musical performers who worked in a traveling circus. His aptitude for conducting appeared at an early age. His family returned to Italy in 1908 when Ferrero was two years old. At four, he appeared publicly as a conductor at the Trocadéro in Paris, where his performance attracted the attention of Jules Massenet.

His official debut took place at the Teatro Costanzi in Rome on 4 November 1912. The program included works by Rossini, Boccherini, Meyerbeer, Grieg, Beethoven, and Wagner. At the time, Ferrero was unable to read music and conducted the repertoire from memory.

As a child, he toured in Europe. In 1914, he appeared in Russia, where his performances attracted public attention, and subsequently traveled to Britain. In May 1914, at the age of seven, he conducted a series of four concerts with the New Symphony Orchestra at the Royal Albert Hall in London. The programs included Beethoven's first symphony, Wagner’s overture to Die Meistersinger von Nürnberg, Grieg's Peer Gynt, and Sibelius's Valse triste. Contemporary British press reports commented on the precision of his conducting and discussed the physical and psychological demands placed on a young performer.

== Education and adult career ==
After the First World War, Ferrero interrupted his activities as a touring prodigy and undertook formal musical studies. He relocated to Vienna to study at the Akademie der Musik. He studied first with Max Springer and later with Ferdinand Löwe, graduating in composition in 1924.

After returning to Italy, he resumed conducting as an adult. A concert at the Augusteo in Rome on 8 February 1925 initiated the next phase of his career. He subsequently conducted in Italian theatres and undertook tours in Poland, Germany, France, Britain, and the Soviet Union.

Ferrero's repertoire changed from that of his childhood concerts. He conducted contemporary works by composers including Renzo Rossellini, Mario Peragallo, and Pietro Ferro, alongside music by Bach, Vivaldi, Mozart, Beethoven, Debussy, Ravel, and Russian orchestral composers. Among the soloists with whom he worked were Wilhelm Backhaus and Arturo Benedetti Michelangeli.

Ferrero toured the Soviet Union in 1951 and 1952, performing and recording with Soviet orchestras. Recordings from these appearances were later issued by Melodiya on LP and subsequently reissued.

== Reception ==
Ferrero's conducting was noted by several musicians of his era. Gennady Rozhdestvensky recalled attending a 1946 performance at the Great Hall of the Moscow Conservatory in which Ferrero conducted Ravel's Boléro. According to Rozhdestvensky, the audience spontaneously rose during the final modulation and remained standing until the end of the piece.

Rozhdestvensky also described a concert in which Ferrero conducted Sibelius's Valse triste four times as an encore, offering a different interpretation each time through changes of tempo and nuance. He cited the episode as an example of improvisation in conducting and later described Ferrero as "something phenomenal."

== Composition and film work ==
Ferrero also composed music. His works included the symphonic poem Il mistero dell'Aurora, a Doppia fuga for large orchestra, and chamber music, much of which remained unpublished.

He also worked in cinema. Ferrero was responsible for the music of Luchino Visconti's 1948 film La terra trema; surviving production credits describe him as coordinating and conducting the film's music.

Ferrero died in Rome on 23 March 1954, aged 47. Recordings of his performances, including material from his Soviet appearances, continued to be issued after his death.
