= Giorgio Costantini =

Brazilian footballer (born 2006)

Personal information
- Date of birth: 16 April 2006 (age 20)
- Place of birth: Curitiba, Brazil
- Height: 1.85 m (6 ft 1 in)
- Position: Midfielder

Team information
- Current team: River Plate

Youth career
- 2023: Athletico Paranaense
- 2023–: River Plate

Senior career*
Years	Team	Apps	(Gls)
2025–	River Plate	2	(0)
- * Club domestic league appearances and goals

Giorgio Costantini (born 16 April 2006) is a Brazilian professional footballer who plays as a midfielder for Argentine Primera Division club River Plate.

== Club career ==
=== Beginnings in Brazil ===
Costantini was born on 16 April 2006 in Curitiba, Brazil. The grandson of Argentine cardiologist Costantino Costantini, he is the younger brother of Brazilian footballer Facundo Costantini. As a youth player, Costantini joined the youth academy of Brazilian side Athletico Paranense.

=== River Plate ===
Following his stint there, he joined the youth academy of Argentine club River Plate during the summer of 2023 and was promoted to the club's senior team in 2025. Constantini got called up for the 2025 FIFA Club World Cup, playing a few minutes against Inter Milan. He then played a few minutes again in the 1–1 away draw against Lanús.

On September 2025, while playing a match with the reserve team, he tore the cruciate ligaments in his left knee, sidelining him for six to eight months.
