= Giuseppe Porelli =

Italian actor

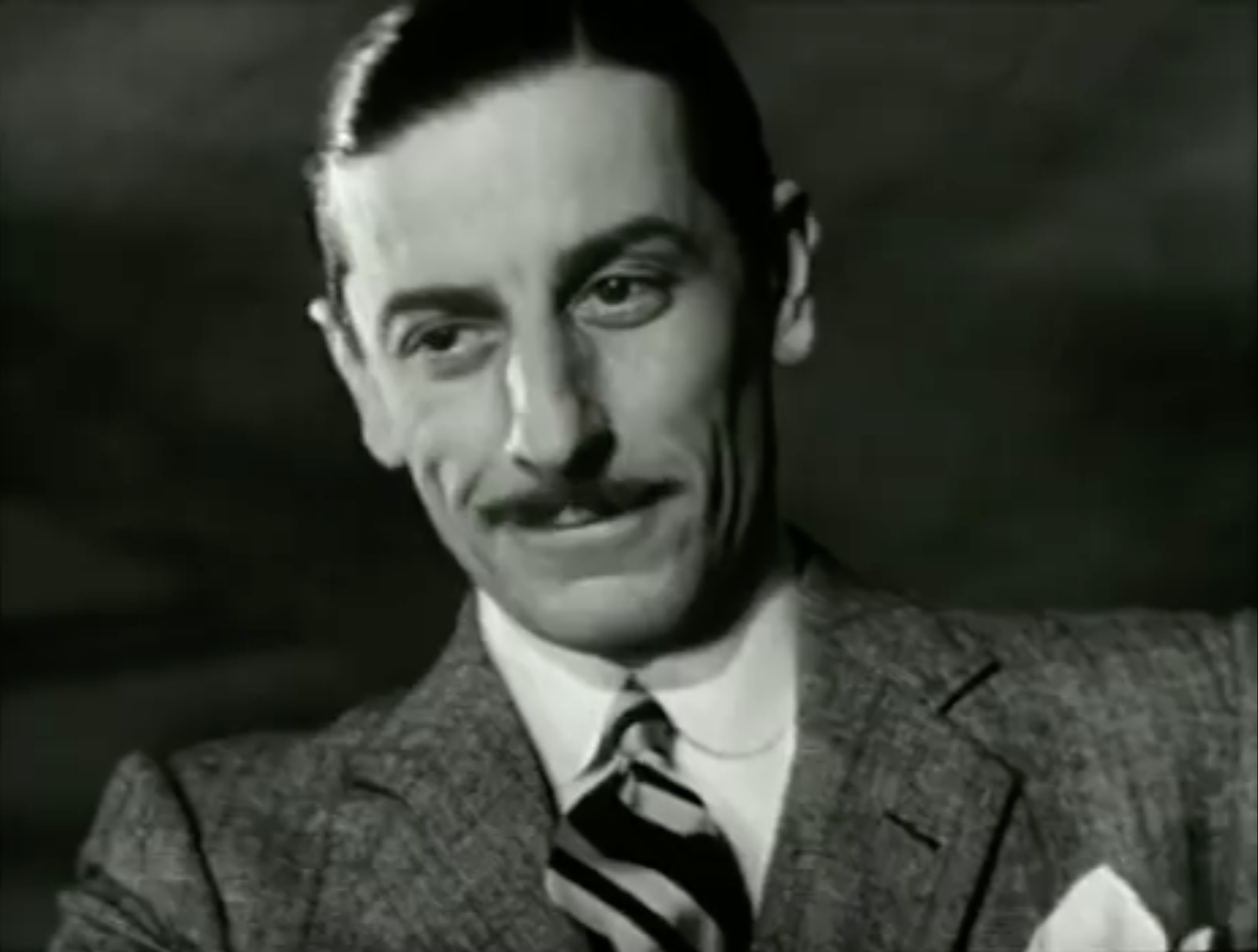
- Porelli in Thirty Seconds of Love (1936)
- Born: 24 November 1897; Naples
- Died: 5 March 1982 (aged 84); Rome

Giuseppe Porelli (24 November 1897 – 5 March 1982) was an Italian stage, film and television actor.

== Life and career ==
Born Giuseppe Porcelli in Naples, he graduated from the Istituto Tecnico and became an employee of Ferrovie dello Stato. While there, he spent his free time involved in amateur dramatics. In 1918 he left his job to accept employment as a professional actor in the company of Irma Gramatica. Porelli later entered some of the most important stage companies of the time, specializing as a sidekick in revue shows. Active on films since 1926, he had an intense career as a character actor, mostly cast in roles of elegant and fashionable gentlemen in comedy films. He was married to the actress Rinalda Marchetti.

== Selected filmography ==
- Just Married (1934)
- Unripe Fruit (1934)
- Thirty Seconds of Love (1936)
- Felicita Colombo (1937)
- Naples of Olden Times (1938)
- The House of Shame (1938)
- Naples Will Never Die (1939)
- Heartbeat (1939)
- Two Million for a Smile (1939)
- Love Trap (1940)
- The Sinner (1940)
- First Love (1941)
- Harlem (1943)
- I'll Always Love You (1943)
- I'll Sing No More (1945)
- The Ten Commandments (1945)
- Peddlin' in Society (1946)
- I Met You in Naples (1946)
- Unknown Man of San Marino (1946)
- Crime News (1947)
- Lost in the Dark (1947)
- È arrivato il cavaliere! (1950)
- Women and Brigands (1950)
- O.K. Nerone (1951)
- Paris Is Always Paris (1951)
- Oggi sposi (1952)
- Melody of Love (1952)
- I, Hamlet (1952)
- It Was She Who Wanted It! (1953)
- The Enchanting Enemy (1953)
- Mid-Century Loves (1954)
- Poverty and Nobility (1954)
- Naples Is Always Naples (1954)
- The Two Orphans (1954)
- Donatella (1956)
- The Wanderers (1956)
- Holiday Island (1957)
- I prepotenti (1958)
- Tunis Top Secret (1959)
- A Mistress for the Summer (1960)
- Tough Guys (1960)
- Don Camillo: Monsignor (1961)
- Stasera mi butto (1967)
- Mi vedrai tornare (1969)
