= Attilio Mattei =

Italian footballer (born 1902)

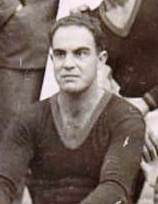

Personal information
- Date of birth: 16 September 1902
- Place of birth: Rome, Italy
- Position: Defender

Senior career*
Years	Team	Apps	(Gls)
1922–1926	Alba Roma	65	(8)
1927–1933	Roma	77	(0)
1933–1934	Sora		
1934–1937	L'Aquila		
- * Club domestic league appearances and goals

Attilio Mattei (born 16 September 1902) was an Italian professional footballer who played as a defender.

He played for four seasons (47 games, no goals) in the Serie A for A.S. Roma.

His younger brothers Augusto Mattei and Aldo Mattei played football professionally. To distinguish them, Attilio was referred to as Mattei I, Augusto as Mattei II and Aldo as Mattei III.
