= Giuseppe Adami =

Italian librettist, playwright and music critic (1878–1946)

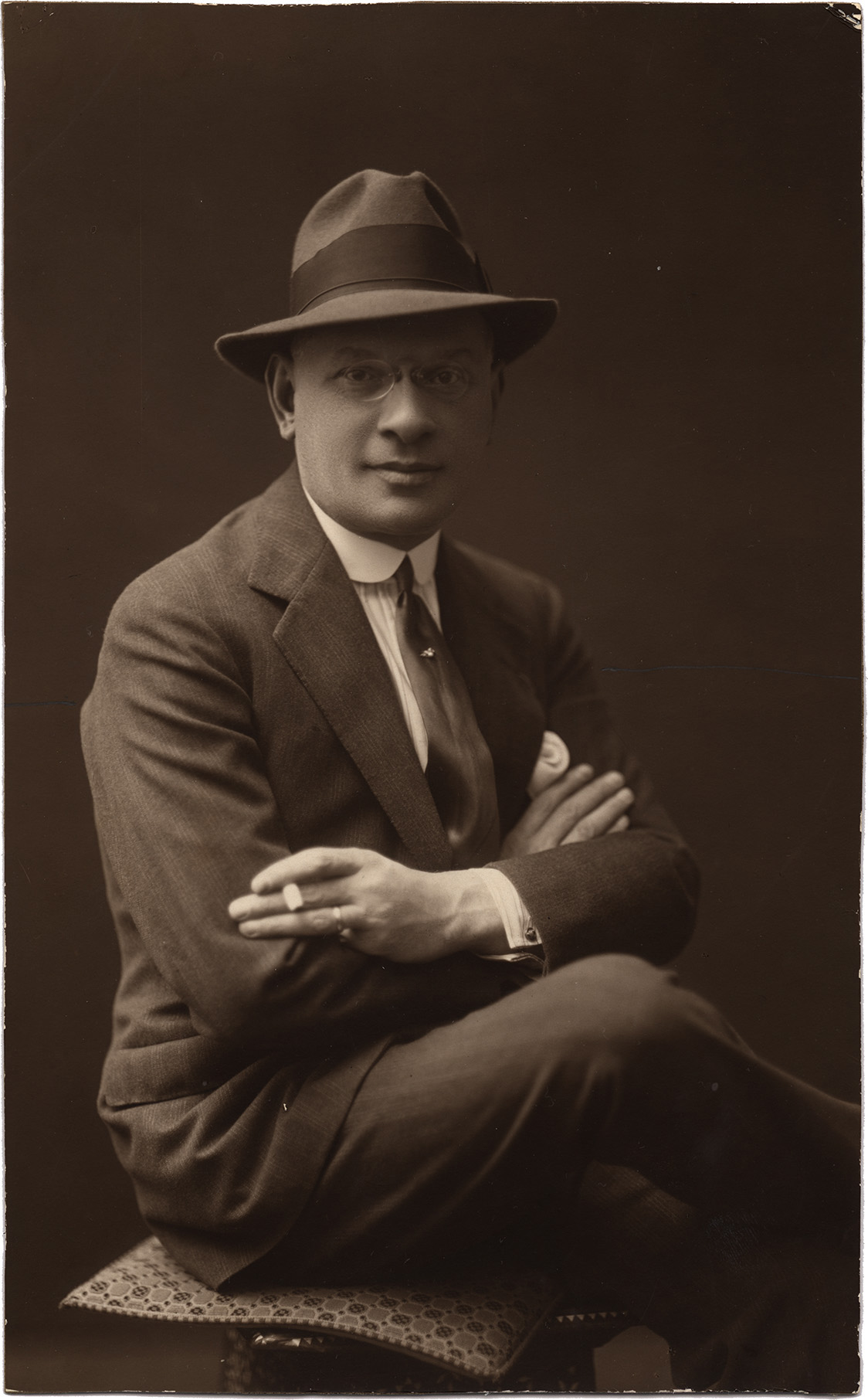
Portrait of Giuseppe Adami

Giuseppe Adami (4 February 1878 – 12 October 1946) was an Italian librettist, playwright and music critic who was best known for his collaboration with Giacomo Puccini on the operas La rondine (1917), Il tabarro (1918) and Turandot (1926).

== Biography ==
He graduated from the University of Padua with a degree in law, but devoted himself mainly to his work as a writer, author of plays and Music journalism.

In October 1912 in La Lettura, a monthly magazine of the Corriere della Sera, Adami published a one-act play entitled La leggenda valacca.

Quoting, not only in the title but also in some passages of the story, the eponymous composition by Italian cellist and composer Gaetano Braga.

After Puccini's death he published a collection of the maestro's Letter (message) in the 1928 Epistolario. In 1935 he also wrote a Biography entitled Giacomo Puccini, becoming one of the composer's first biographers.In 1942 he wrote a new biography entitled The Novel of Giacomo Puccini's Life.

Adami also wrote librettos for other composers, such as Riccardo Zandonai, for the opera La via della finestra.He was a music critic for the Milan magazine La sera and, from 1931 to 1934, wrote for the magazine La commedia. He collaborated until the end of his life with the Casa Ricordi publishing group.

His published works include a Children's literature book entitled Narran le maschere.

He rests in Cimitero Monumentale di Milano.

== Works of plays ==
Adami wrote several plays, such as I fioi di Goldoni, Una capanna e il tuo cuore (1913), Capelli bianchi (1915), Felicità Colombo (1935) and Nonna Felicità (1936). The latter was adapted into a film in 1938 by director Mario Mattoli.

== Early life, training and biography ==
Adami was born in Verona. He graduated from the University of Padua in Law but dedicated his career as a writer, theatre playwright, and then music critic. After the death of Puccini, Adami published a collection of the composer's letters in Epistolario (1928). He also published his personal recollections; Giulio Ricordi e i suoi musicisti (1933); Giacomo Puccini (1935) (this was one of the earliest biographies of the composer); and a second biography of Puccini Il romanzo della vita di Giacomo Puccini (1942).

== Librettos ==
Adami also wrote librettos for other composers including Riccardo Zandonai's La via della finestra (1919); and Franco Vittadini's Anima allegra (1921) and Nazareth (1925). He was a music critic for La sera (Milan) and for the review La comedia from 1931 to 1934. Adami acted as publicist with the house of Ricordi to the end of his life. He died in Milan aged 67.

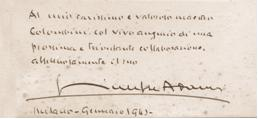
Giuseppe Adami autograph 1943
