= Guglielmo Guastaveglia =

Italian comics artist (1889–1984)

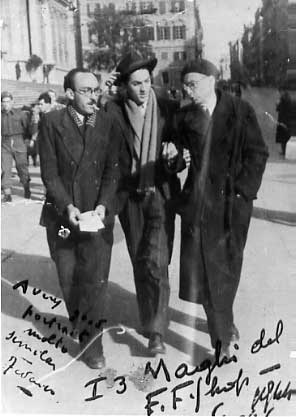
Carlo Bompiani, Federico Fellini and Guastaveglia walking in Rome (1944)

Guglielmo Guastaveglia (6 April 1889 – 1984), also known as Guasta, Guglielmo Guasta and Guasta Veglia, was an Italian illustrator, comics artist and writer. He was the first cartoonist to produce autoctone Mickey Mouse comic strips in Italy.

== Life and career ==
Born in Rome, Guastaveglia made his professional debut in 1908, in the magazine Il Travaso delle idee, and collaborated with other publications including Vamba's Corriere della Domenica. In 1921 he was named editor of Il Travaso, which under his direction exceeded a sales run of 300,000 copies, but in 1925 he was dismissed because of his antifascism. He then started collaborating, under pseudonyms, with other publications, including Corriere dei Piccoli and Il Giornalino della Domenica. In 1927 he founded with his wife Olga and the poet Trilussa a puppet theatre, "Baracca delle Favole" ('Fairytale Hut').

In 1931, Guastaveglia began collaborating with Il Popolo di Roma, a newspaper founded in 1925 to replace the Roman edition of Il Popolo d'Italia, and which under the direction of Paolo De Cristofaro employed many anti-fascist intellectuals, including Adriano Tilgher, Mario Missiroli, Corrado Alvaro and Mario Vinciguerra. In the newspaper he wrote and illustrated a series of comic strips featuring Mickey Mouse and Minnie Mouse; in his autoctone and unauthorized comic universe, Mickey Mouse was more similar to a Commedia dell'arte character than to his American counterpart, and his stories featured Felix the Cat and Kat Nipp as main antagonists. In 1932, he was employed by Marc'Aurelio. In 1944, he founded the "Funny Faces Shop" with his Marc'Aurelio colleagues Federico Fellini and Carlo Ludovico Bompiani.

In 1946, Guastaveglia was reinstated as editor of Il Travaso delle Idee, which he directed until 1962. He was also active as a caricaturist, a painter, a children book author and an essayist, notably writing an encyclopaedia of humour ("Enciclopedia dell'Umorismo") in four volumes. In 1972, he played Pope Pius XII in Fellini's Roma.
