= Nerone (1930 film) =

1930 film

- Petrolini as Nero
- Directed by: Alessandro Blasetti
- Written by: Ettore Petrolini
- Starring: Ettore Petrolini
- Cinematography: Carlo Montuori
- Edited by: Cines
- Music by: Pietro Sassoli
- Distributed by: Pittaluga
- Release date: 1930
- Running time: 80 minutes
- Country: Italy
- Language: Italian

Nerone (1930) is an Italian comedy film, directed by Alessandro Blasetti. It stars Ettore Petrolini as the main actor. It has been described as a "Roman farce", a genre which was popular in Italy at the time. It is a parody of the Roman Empire and of the notorious Roman emperor, Nero. It was shot at the Cines Studios in Rome.

According to some critics, this parody was actually a satire against the fascist dictatorship and Benito Mussolini.

A full copy of the film no longer exists; there are only several excerpts that were included in the documentary Antologia Petrolini that was edited by the National Film Library and was shown at the 1952 Venice Film Festival.

== Synopsis ==
The film features some unforgettable characters (more precisely in Italian: macchiette) created by Ettore Petrolini: Gastone, Fortunello and Nero. Nero, who rides a bicycle, which burns Rome with a match, then calls the fire department by phone from the imperial palace. There is also Petrolini in his dressing room surrounded by admirers, including a young girl who returns to the theater the next day, between the two was born a flirt, but the actor will not leave the theater to go out with her.

== Cast ==
- Ettore Petrolini: Gastone/Nerone/Fortunello/Pulcinella/himself
- Grazia del Rio: l'ammiratrice (the fan)
- Mercedes Brignone: Atte (Claudia Acte)
- Alfredo Martinelli: Petronio (Publius Petronius Turpilianus)
- Elma Krimer: Poppea, (Poppaea Sabina)

== Production ==
It is the first of three sound films interpreted by Ettore Petrolini who, flanked by some members of his theater company, performs here in some of the characters that had made him famous: Pulcinella, Gastone, Fortunello, Nero.

In Italy it grossed nearly 5 million lire, an impressive success for the time, compared to €35,000,000 today.

Blasetti, despite self-defining his role as just a "technical coordinator", without any directorial role, he left his mark, starting from the idea of the "spoken" opening titles. He was particularly critically appreciated for the choice of shots and camera movements, including the initial use of camera dolly, that was technically very challenging for the time.
