= Scarselli =

Scarselli is an Italian surname. Notable people with the surname include:

- Adolfo Scarselli (1866–1945), Italian painter
- Leonardo Scarselli (born 1975), Italian cyclist

== See also ==
- Scarsellino
- Scarpelli
