= Le burle di Furbicchio ai maghi =

Le burle di Furbicchio ai maghi ('Furbicchio's pranks to the magicians') is a comic strip story designed by Filiberto Scarpelli and published in Italy by the Imperia Publishing House in 1924, as the fourth volume of the Raccolta Gaia collection; it's considered the first comic book published in Italy.
