= Giovanni Titta Rosa =

Italian writer

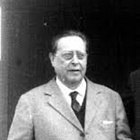
- Born: 5 March 1891; Santa Maria del Ponte, Italy
- Died: 7 January 1972 (aged 80); Milan, Italy

Giovanni Titta Rosa (5 March 1891 – 7 January 1972) was an Italian literary critic, poet, and novelist.

Born in Santa Maria del Ponte, at that time frazione of Fontecchio, Titta Rosa graduated in letters at the University of Florence and then started collaborating as a literary critic with a large number of publications, notably Lacerba, La Stampa, Il Secolo XIX, Il Resto del Carlino and Corriere della Sera.

Titta Rosa was also author of novels, essays and collections of poems. In 1931 he was awarded the Bagutta Prize for his collection of short stories Il varco nel muro.
