= Filiberto Scarpelli =

Italian cartoonist and illustrator (1870–1933)

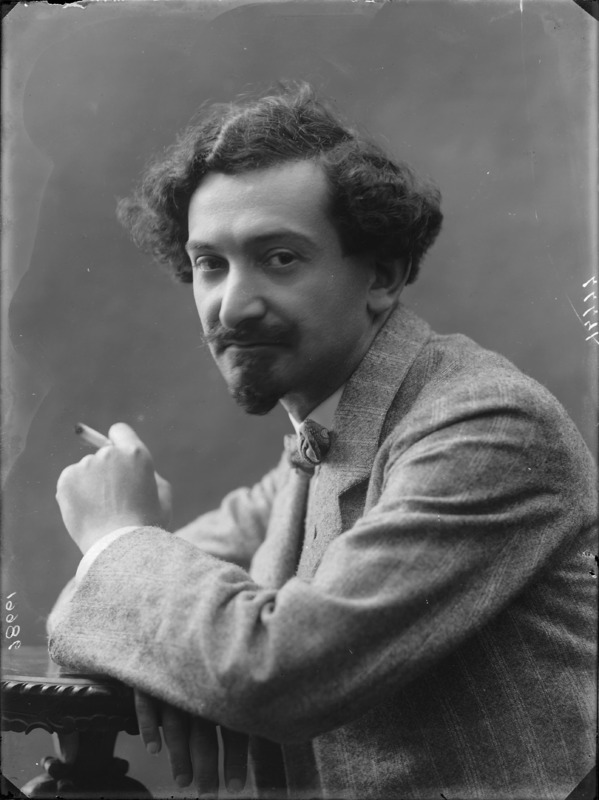
- Born: 29 June 1870; Naples, Italy
- Died: 20 August 1933 (aged 63); Rome, Italy
- Occupations: Cartoonist, illustrator

Filiberto Scarpelli (29 June 1870 –20 August 1933) was an Italian cartoonist, caricaturist, illustrator and journalist.

== Life and career ==
Born in Naples, the brother of the illustrator Tancredi, Scarpelli graduated from the Accademia di Belle Arti di Napoli. He then moved to Rome, where he started his professional career in the magazine Orazio Coccola. After collaborating with L'Asino, working as a journalist for the newspaper Corriere d’Italia and illustrating several textbooks, in 1900 he co-founded the satirical magazine Il Travaso delle idee, also serving as its editor between 1925 and 1928. In 1916 he and Enrico Sacchetti held an exhibition titled Italian artists and the war at the Leicester Galleries in London.

Scarpelli was a close collaborator of Vamba in his Il giornalino della domenica, and his collaborations also include Corriere dei Piccoli, L'Avanti, La Tribuna illustrata, Lacerba. He also illustrated postcards, sheet music covers, film posters, and was a children book author and a novelist.

Initially a member of Scapigliatura movement, Scarpelli later joined the Futurism. He was close to fascism, collaborating with Mussolini's newspaper Il Popolo d'Italia between 1915 and 1919 as well as with other fascist publications, and illustrating the National Fascist Party election poster in 1924.

== Personal life and death ==
He died in 1933, killed by a drunken innkeeper with whom he had incurred debts. He was the father of the screenwriter Furio, the film director Manlio and the cinematographer Marco Scarpelli.
