= Il Giornalino di Gian Burrasca =

Italian novel by Vamba

Il Giornalino di Gian Burrasca is an Italian novel by Vamba (a.k.a. Luigi Bertelli).

It was first published, between 1907 and 1908, in sequential installments in the children's magazine Il giornalino della Domenica, and in 1912 it was published in book format. Set in Tuscany and partly in Rome, the book is imagined as the diary of Giannino Stoppani, nicknamed "Gian Burrasca" ("Johnny Tempest") because of his exuberant and restless behavior. The author Vamba also illustrated the book.

The novel successfully attracted a large audience, especially among young readers. It was adapted into film in 1943 and 1982, and into a popular RAI TV-series starring Rita Pavone in 1964.
