= Ettore Petrolini =

Italian actor and playwright

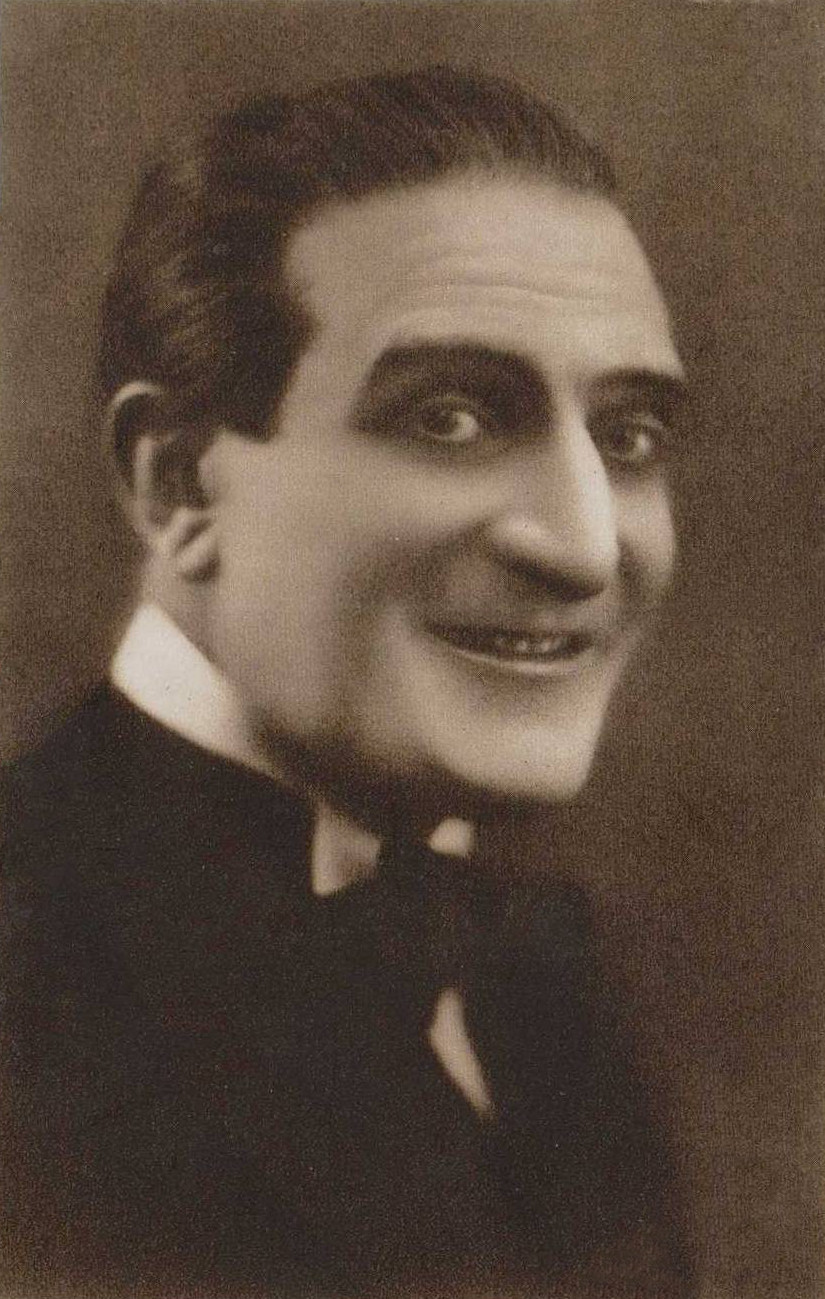
- Ettore Petrolini in 1934
- Born: 13 January 1884; Rome, Italy
- Died: 29 June 1936 (aged 52); Rome, Italy
- Occupations: Actor, playwright, novelist, screenwriter
- Spouse: Elma Criner
- Children: Oreste Petrolini, Renato Petrolini

Ettore Petrolini (13 January 1884 – 29 June 1936) was an Italian stage and film actor, playwright, screenwriter and novelist. He is considered one of the most important figures of avanspettacolo, vaudeville and revue. He was noted for his numerous caricature sketches, and was the "inventor of a revolutionary and anticonformist way of performing". Petrolini is also remembered for having created the "futurista" character Fortunello. His contribution to the history of Italian theater is now widely acknowledged, especially with regard to his influence on 20th century comedy. His iconic character Gastone became a byword in Italian for a certain type of stagey snob. His satirical caricature of the Roman Emperor Nero (created in 1917 and later the subject of a 1930 film) was widely perceived as a parody of Benito Mussolini, although it may itself have influenced the mannerisms of the Fascist dictator.

== Early years ==
Born in Rome on 13 January 1884, (Note: Petrolini habitually took two years off his real age and claimed he was born in 1886.) Petrolini was the fourth of six children of a blacksmith from Ronciglione and grandson of a carpenter. He had a difficult relationship with father, who was a strict moralist, but was close to his mother, who supported him both emotionally and financially when he decided to embrace a performing career. He attended theaters in Rome as a boy, improvising for fun. His first performances were in the sideshows on Piazza Guglielmo Pepe. At the age of 13, Petrolini attended reform school as he bitterly recalls in his memoirs. When 15, he decided to leave home to pursue a career in the theater. In 1900, he participated in a show at the "Pietro Cossa Theater" on the Trastevere. Later, he performed in small, provincial theaters and in some cafés chantants with the stage name Ettore Loris.

== Career ==
In 1903, Petrolini began performing in Rome at variety theaters and café-chantants, where he provided parodies of renowned nineteenth-century actors, silent movie and opera divas, rhetorical addresses, and even of the variety theater itself. In the same year, when aged 19, he met Ines Colapietro, who became both his professional and personal companion for many years, as well as the mother of his two children. Ines, who was at the time only 15 years old, was hired as a singer by the Gambrinus theater in Rome, along with her sister Tina. Ettore and Ines formed the comic duo Loris-Petrolini, performing together until the summer of 1911. In May 1907 in Genoa, Ettore and Ines were invited by the impresario Charles Séguin to tour South America. They performed in theaters and cafes in Argentina, Uruguay and Brazil, enjoying great success everywhere and becoming a household name in the capitals. While Petrolini was in Rio de Janeiro, appendicitis forced him to leave the stage for a month. After an emergency operation and a period of convalescence, his comeback was triumphant, with many theatrical artists giving up their pay in his favor. In a single evening, Petrolini once earned four thousand lire. After Rio, Petrolini remained a few months longer in South America. He returned for other tours in 1909 and 1911-1912, also appearing in Mexico and Cuba.

Back from a successful tour in South America, Petrolini was hired in 1910 by Giuseppe Jovinelli for his theater in Piazza Guglielmo Pepe that had opened in 1909 with a performance by Raffaele Viviani. It was a great success and, after two seasons at the Teatro Jovinelli, the "Sala Umberto" company signed an exclusive three-year contract with him. In 1915, he formed his stage company, the Compagnia dei grandi spettacoli di varietà Petrolini, with whom he staged the revue Zero minus zero, that led to the debut of one of Petrolini's most famous characters, Fortunello, which was based upon a cartoon character. The performance aroused the enthusiasm of Futurists such as Filippo Tommaso Marinetti who called Fortunello "the most difficult to analyze of all Petrolini's masterpieces." Petrolini was so flattered by the admiration of the Futurists that he participated in some of their public events performing texts of Marinetti, Bruno Corra and Emilio Settimelli. The collaboration culminated in Radioscopia di un duetto ("Radioscopy of a duet"), a one-act play co-written with the Futurist writer and painter Francesco Cangiullo in 1918. The following year, Mario Bonnard directed a film based on the play, Mentre il pubblico ride ("While the audience laughs"), starring Petrolini (in his film debut) and Niny Dinelli. Petrolini developed an anti-Dannunzian position, something which was appreciated by the Futurists, and thus he put on exhibit during his variety sketches.

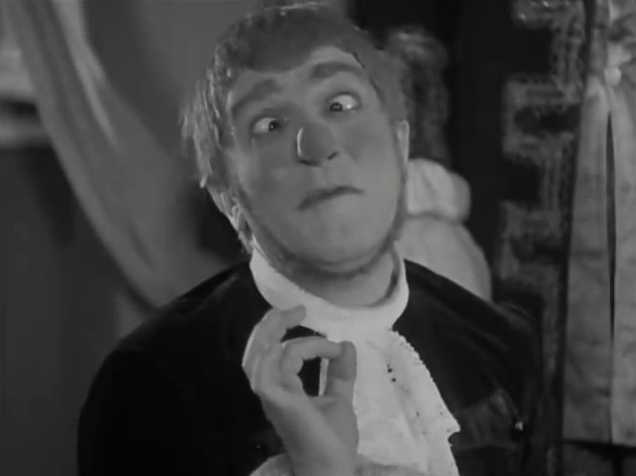
Petrolini starring in the film Il Medico per forza (1931)

From the 1920s, Petrolini's repertoire was enriched with a series of plays by Italian authors such as Alfredo Testoni, Renato Simoni, Roberto Bracco, Luigi Antonelli, Ugo Ojetti, Salvatore Gotta, Fausto Maria Martini, adapted by Petrolini himself. In 1925, he took his stage adaptation of Luigi Pirandello's Lumie di Sicilia, called Agro de limone. In the 1920s, he also met Elma Criner, who became his companion and later his wife. In 1930, with the advent of sound films, Petrolini returned to the cinema as a protagonist of Nerone by Alessandro Blasetti, and also featuring Criner in the part of Poppea. The film featured some of Petrolini's most famous interpretations: Gastone, Nerone, Pulcinella. The same year he starred in Cortile by Carlo Campogalliani, based on the play of the same name by Fausto Maria Martini. Cortile was released the following year in a double bill with Il Medico per forza, Campogalliania and Petronelli's spoof version of Molière's farce Le Médecin malgré lui. In Scenario's July 1934 issue, Petrolini has 94 close-ups, in a variety of poses, expressions, and emotional interpretations.

In addition to films, he continued to make many short versions of stage plays. Petrolini's work as a playwright became richer and more complex over the years: from the first macchiette (i.e. comic musical monologues caricaturing stock characters), to the successful one-act plays Amori de notte and Romani de Roma to the late comedies such as Gastone, Il padiglione delle meraviglie, Benedetto fra le donne ("Blessed among women"), and Chicchignola. In these last two works, Petrolinian drama reached its peak, as irreverence gave way to more mature depictions, both bitter and compassionate, of human weakness. Now famous, Petrolini left Italy for a series of tours abroad, first to Cairo and the Italian colonies of Tripolitania and Cyrenaica, and then, in 1934, to London, Berlin, and Paris. In Paris, he obtained what he considered the highest honor: an invitation to stage Il medico per forza at the Comédie Française, the temple of Molière. He also performed in London at the Little Theatre, in Berlin at the Kurfürstendamm Theater, and in Vienna at the Komödie Theater, where his burlesque impression of Hamlet was considered hilarious.

=== Imitation and parody ===
Petrolini is considered one of the most influential figures in Italian avanspettacolo, vaudeville and revue. According to the Encyclopædia Britannica, he was the "inventor of a revolutionary and anticonformist way of performing". He was famous for his many caricature sketches, and he developed a repertoire of caricatural characters of proven success, as in Oh Margherita!, a parody portrayal of Faust (1907). His characters included Giggi er bullo (a parody of the leading character in a play by Gastone Monaldi) and Sor Capanna (a cantastorie inspired by Pietro Capanna, whom Petrolini called "my master"). Petrolini wrote: "Imitation is not art because if it were there would be art even in monkeys and parrots. The art is to deform." A characteristic of his art was the continuous reworking of the characters he created, giving them the profile and texture of real comedy characters. This was the case of Gastone, the subject of a skit titled "Il bell'Arturo" in the 1915 revue Venite a sentire, subsequently performed on several occasions and developed into a tragicomedy, Gastone, in 1924. Gastone was both a parody of the stars of the declining world of silent films and of singers of the time, such as Gino Franzi, with their repertory of dramatic songs lamenting sad farewells and unrequited loves. Another character that started as a skit – "l'Antico romano" – was Nerone, who developed as a parody both of imperial political rhetoric and of the emphatic declamatory style of the "great actors" of the day.

=== Songs ===
Music played a key role in Petrolini's theatrical style and is an important ingredient in many of his comedies. Many of his characters sing songs and ditties (filastrocche), or declaim verses to a musical accompaniment. Petrolini was often an interpreter, and sometimes also the author, of popular songs of the day, many of which were released as records. One of the biggest hits of 1926 was Una gita a li castelli – also known as Nanni – written by Franco Silvestri and performed (and arranged) by Petrolini. His most famous song, originally recorded in 1932, with music by Alberto Simeoni, is undoubtedly Tanto pe' cantà, which evokes an uncomplicated vision of life. The song quickly came to symbolize a way of life that was felt to be characteristically Roman – it was later recorded by many well known Roman artists, such as Alvaro Amici, Gigi Proietti, Gabriella Ferri and, most prominently perhaps, Nino Manfredi, who had a major commercial success with it.

== Personal life ==
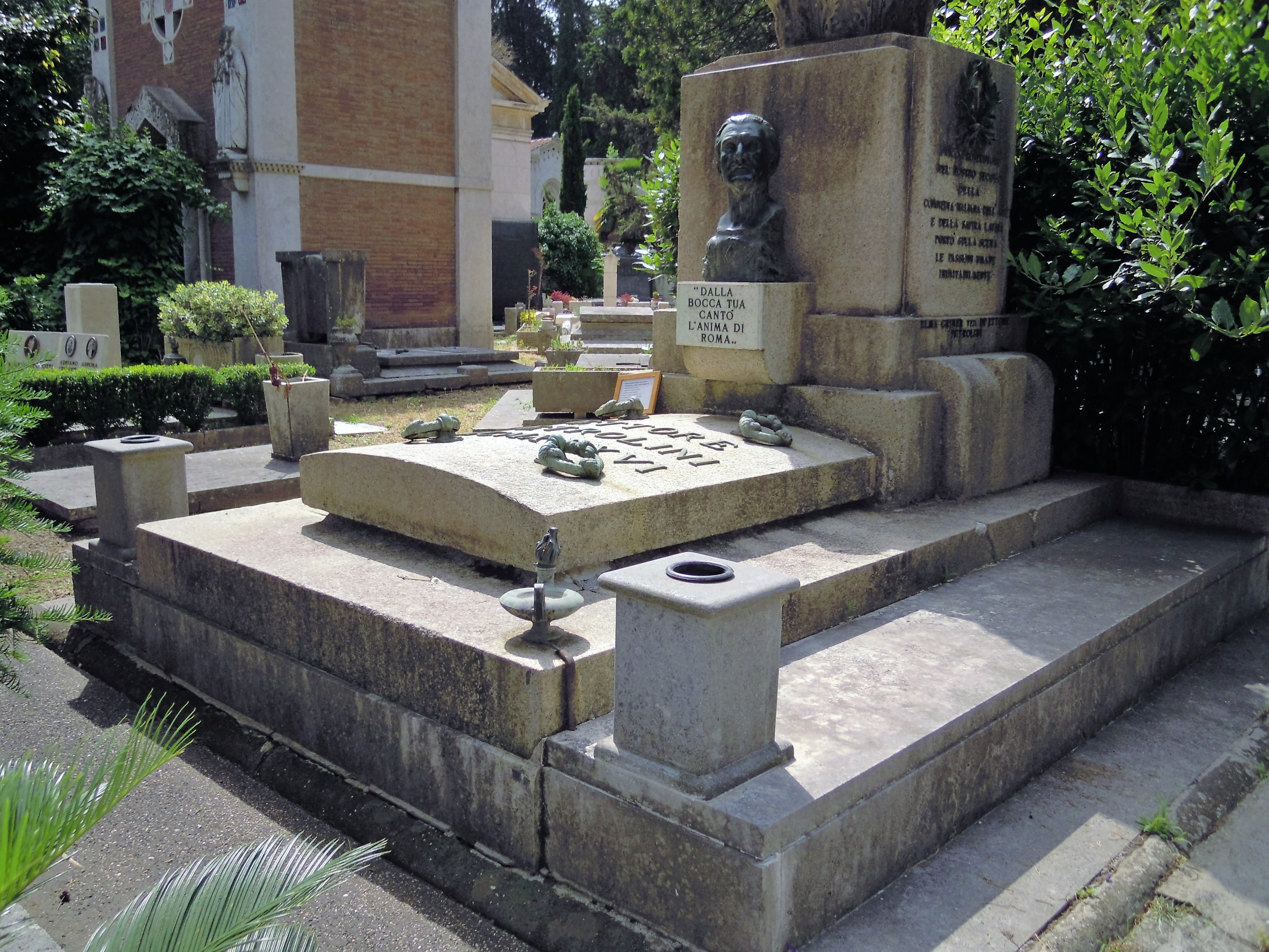
Petrolini's tomb in Campo Verano, rebuilt after the original was hit in an air raid

In 1923, Petrolini was initiated into Freemasonry.

Petrolini's sympathies for, and impertinences towards, the Fascist regime were complex. Petrolini was admired and befriended by Mussolini, even though his Nerone caricature was widely perceived as a parody of the dictator. As noted by the critic Oreste Del Buono, the Nerone character – first created by Petrolini in 1917 – may actually have influenced Mussolini's own mannerisms. Although a public supporter of the regime, Petrolini did not refrain from satire, including a famously disrespectful rejoinder after Mussolini had presented him with a medal.

Forced to quit the stage in 1935 following a severe attack of angina pectoris, he died aged 52, in Rome, on 29 June 1936. (Note: When the priest presented the oil for the extreme unction, Petrolini is said to have exclaimed "Now I really am fried!" (i.e. "done for").) The corpse, dressed in a tailcoat of his celebrated character Gastone, was buried at the Cemetery of Verano. On 19 July 1943, during the first bombing of Rome, his tomb – a rectangular chapel – was hit, breaking the marble bust and severely damaging the coffin containing the remains of the actor. The renovated tomb bears the epitaph "Dalla bocca tua cantò l'anima di Roma" ("The soul of Rome sang from your mouth"). (Note: The epitaph is a quotation from Ghetanaccio, a play by Augusto Jandolo dedicated to Petrolini.)

== Legacy ==
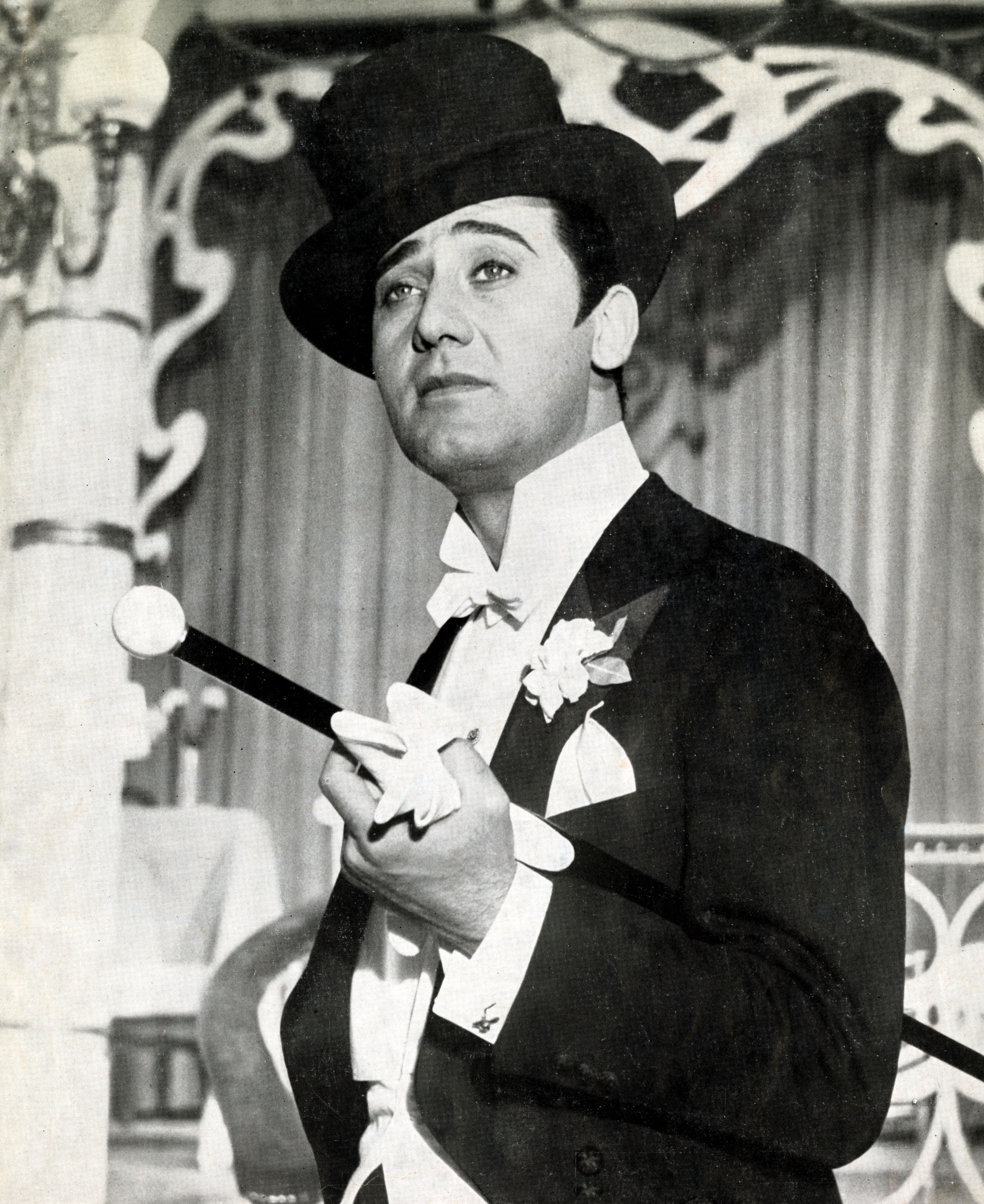
Alberto Sordi interpreting Gastone in the film of the same name (1960) inspired by Petrolini's original creation

Petrolini influenced future generations of Italian comic actors, including Alberto Sordi, Carlo Verdone and Gigi Proietti. His Gastone became a byword in Italian for a certain type of artistic snob and ladies man (and later for a man kissed by fortune, after the Donald Duck character Gladstone Gander was rendered in Italian as "Gastone Paperone"). In 1960, a film version of Gastone was released, starring Alberto Sordi. The film was directed by Sordi's old friend Mario Bonnard, the man who is thought to have provided the original inspiration for Petrolini's iconic character.

== Theatrical works ==
Source: Archivio Petrolini at the Biblioteca e Museo teatrale del Burcardo, Rome.

=== Impersonations and parodies ===
- L'Amante dei fiori
- Amleto [con Libero Bovio]
- L'antico romano
- Archimede
- Baciami, baciami
- Il bell'Arturo
- La Caccavella
- Canzone guappa
- Cirano
- Il conte d'Acquafresca
- Il Cuoco
- Il Danzadero
- Divorzio al parmiggiano
- La Domatrice
- Faust (Oh Margherita!)
- Fortunello
- Giggi er bullo
- Isabella e Beniamino
- Ma l'amor mio non muore
- Maria Stuarda
- Napoleone
- Paggio Fernando
- I piedi
- Il poeta
- Il prestigiatore
- I Salamini
- Er Sor Capanna
- Stornelli maltusiani
- Ti à piaciato?
- Il Turco

=== Reviews ===
- 1915: Venite a sentire con G. Carini
- 1915: Zero meno zero con Luciano Folgore
- 1916: Dove andremo a finire? con G. Carini
- 1916: Acqua salata (o Senza sugo) con T. Masini
- 1916: Favorischino

=== Plays ===
- 1917: Nerone
- 1917: Romani de Roma
- 1917: Amori de notte
- 1918: Radioscopia con Francesco Cangiullo
- 1918: Cento de 'sti giorni con Checco Durante
- 1918: 47 morto che parla
- 192.: Donnaiuolo
- 1923: Farsa di Pulcinella
- 1924: Gastone - Bologna, 14 aprile 1924
- 1924: Il padiglione delle meraviglie
- 1927: Benedetto fra le donne
- 1931: Chicchignola
- 1934-1935: Il metropolitano - mai rappresentata

=== Adaptations of other authors ===
- Agro di limone da Lumie di Sicilia di Luigi Pirandello
- L'amante legittimo di Cipriano Giachetti
- Ambasciatori di Lucio D'Ambra
- L'avvocato Bonafede da Congedo di Renato Simoni
- Il barone di Corbò di Luigi Antonelli
- Il cantastorie di Ferrante Alvaro De Torres e Alberto Simeoni
- Il castigamatti di Giulio Svetoni
- Cometa di Yambo
- La coppa incantata da La coupe enchantée di Jean de la Fontaine, traduzione di E. Corradi
- Coraggio di Augusto Novelli
- Cortile di Fausto Maria Martini
- È arrivato l'accordatore di Paola Riccora
- Elogio del furto di D. Signorini
- Il fondo d'oro di Galeazzo Ciano
- La fortuna di Cecè di Athos Setti
- I fratelli Castiglioni di Alberto Colantuoni
- Garofano di Ugo Ojetti
- Ghetanaccio di Augusto Jandolo
- Giovacchino Belli di Augusto Jandolo
- Giovanni Arce da Le esperienze di Giovanni Arce filosofo di Pier Maria Rosso di San Secondo
- Un guasto nell'ascensore by André Mouëzy-Éon
- L'Illusionista da L'Illusioniste di Sacha Guitry
- Io non sono io di Toddi
- La regina ha mangiato la foglia di Gildo Passini
- Ma non lo nominare di Arnaldo Fraccaroli
- Maritiamo la suocera di Colorno
- Il medico per forza da Le médecin malgré lui di Molière
- Mezzo milione di Alfredo Testoni
- Mi uccido di Paola Riccora
- Mille lire di Salvator Gotta
- Mustafà di Armando Discepolo e Rafael J. De Rosa
- Ottobrata di Giovanni Cesare Pascucci e Augusto Topai
- I pantaloncini di G. Nancy
- Patalocco di Ugo Romagnoli
- Peppe er pollo di Augusto Novelli
- Per la porta di Felyne Ossip
- Pinelli di Ettore Veo
- Rifiuto... io di Corrado D'Errico
- Scarfarotto di Gino Rocca
- Lo sfratto di Enrico Serretta
- Teodoro è stanco di Max Nel
- Toccalafrusta di Ugo Chiarelli
- I tre di Dino Falconi
- La trovata di Paolino di Renzo Martinelli
- Tutti in cantina di Eugène Labiche
- Tutto si accomoda di Enrico Serretta
- Uno degli onesti di Roberto Bracco
- Un uomo onesto di Piero Ottolini
- Zeffirino di Gian Capo
- Zio prete di Giovanni Tonelli

== Selected filmography ==
- Nerone (1930)
- The Doctor in Spite of Himself (1931)
- Courtyard (1931)

== Notes and references ==
Notes

== Sources ==
- Calò, Annamaria (1989). Ettore Petrolini. La Nuova Italia. ISBN 978-88-221-0740-4.
