= List of works by Eugenio Zampighi =

Partial list of works by the italian artist Eugenio Zampighi

Eugenio Zampighi (1859–1944) was an Italian genre painter and photographer who mainly depicted joyous and idyllic images of Italian rural life, devoid of any hint of social criticism. Zampighi was influenced both by the style of Gaetano Chierici, and by the Florentine Macchiaioli School.

== Paintings ==
Year	Title	Image	Collection	Comments
1880	A wounded retiarius gladiator in the Flavian amphitheater in Rome, oil on canvas		Civic Museum of Modena	
1883	Fabiola passing out at the sudden news of her father's death, oil on canvas		Civic Museum of Modena	
	Grandpa's favorite, oil on canvas		Private	
	Peasant's music, oil on canvas		Private	
	A happy family, oil on canvas		Private	
	A Treat for the baby, oil on canvas		Private	
	Untitled (peasant family genre scene)			
	Untitled (old peasant couple)			
	Untitled (he loves me, he loves me not)			
	Untitled (mother and child. mother's joy)			
	Untitled (mother playing with her baby)			
	Untitled (mother sewing with her baby)			
	A captive audience			
	A happy family, oil on canvas		Private	
	Cherries for the baby			
	The fear of the dog			
	Feeding time			
	First steps			
	Idyllic family scene with newborn			
	Playing with the baby			
	Playing with the baby, oil on canvas			
	Reading the news			
	The writing lesson			
	A happy family			
	Reading Il Travaso, oil on canvas		Private	Il Travaso delle idee was an Italian satirical magazine.
	The first taste of the food, watercolor on cardboard		Private	
	Playful kittens, oil on canvas		Private	
	Untitled (the unexpected visitor)			
	Visiting grandfather, oil on canvas		Private	
	Elderly couple reading		Beamish Museum, Stanley, UK	
	Her first lesson, oil on canvas		Potteries Museum & Art Gallery, Hanley, UK	
	Tantalizing, oil on canvas		Potteries Museum & Art Gallery, Hanley, UK	
	Music in the family, Siena, oil on canvas		Private	
	The admirer, oil on canvas		Private	
	Untitled (peasant interior, one woman and two man)			
	Caress			
	The watch			
	Sharing a drink,			
	Sharing their pleasures, oil on canvas		Shipley Art Gallery, Gateshead, UK	
	The bow tie, oil on canvas		Private	
	Untitled (young peasant woman reading to an old man)			
	He loves me, he loves me not			

== Sources ==
- "Eugenio Zampighi". artnet.com.
- "Sold at Auction: Eugenio Zampighi". invaluable.com.
