= Gastone =

Gastone is a masculine Italian given name. Notable people with the name include:

- Gastone Baldi (1901–1971), Italian professional football player
- Gastone Bean (born 1936), Italian former professional footballer who played as a striker
- Gastone Bottini (born 1987), Italian professional footballer who plays as a midfielder
- Gastone Brilli-Peri (1893–1930), Italian racing driver, won the 1925 Italian Grand Prix
- Gastone Darè (1918–1976), Italian Olympic fencer
- Gastone Gambara (1890–1962), Italian General during the Spanish Civil War and World War II
- Gastone Moschin (1929–2017), Italian actor
- Gastone Nencini (1930–1980), Italian road racing cyclist
- Gastone Novelli (1895–1919), World War I flying ace credited with eight aerial victories
- Gastone Pierini (1899–1967), Italian weightlifter
- Gastone Prendato (1910–1980), Italian professional football player and coach
- Gastone Ventura (1906–1981), Italian aristocrat
- Gian Gastone de' Medici, Grand Duke of Tuscany (1671–1737), the seventh and last Medicean Grand Duke of Tuscany
- Gastone (Petrolini), Italian character created by Ettore Petrolini in his homonymous comedy
