= Achille Campanile =

Italian writer (1899–1977)

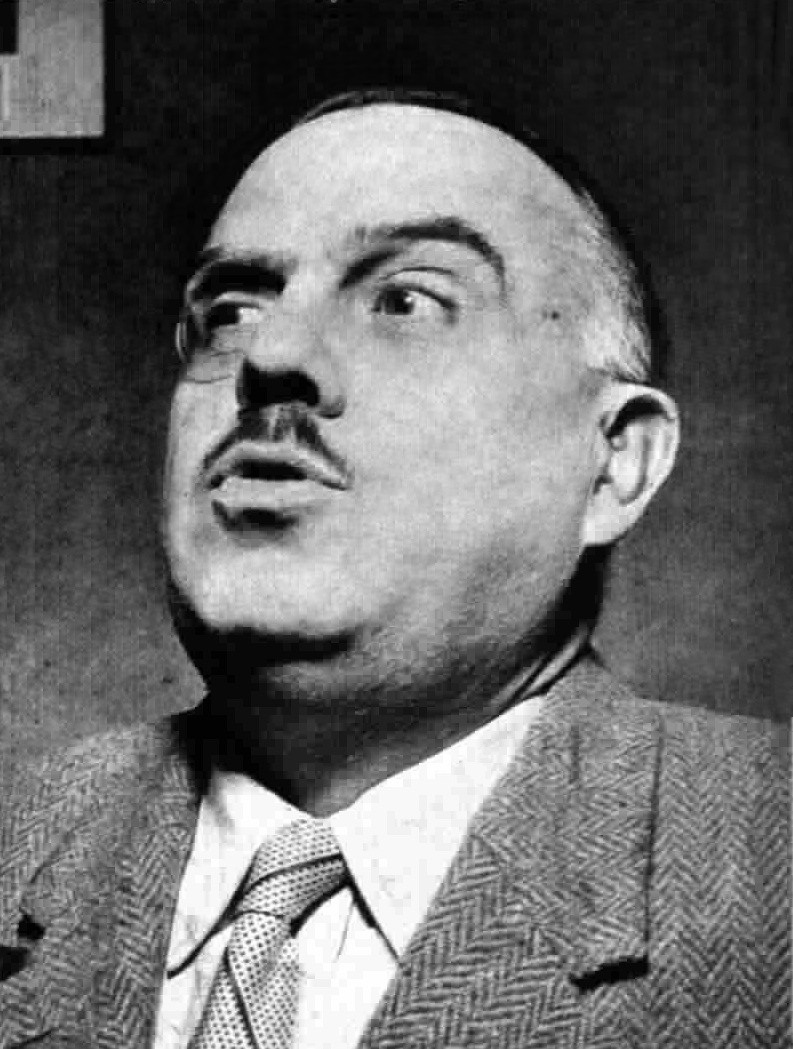
- Achille Campanile
- Born: 28 September 1899; Rome, Kingdom of Italy
- Died: 4 January 1977 (aged 77); Lariano, Italy
- Education: Sapienza University of Rome
- Occupations: Novelist; playwright; Intellectual; Literary critic
- Spouses: Maria Rosa Lisa (m. 1940; div. 1943) Giuseppina Bellavita (m. 1953)
- Children: 1
- Parent(s): Gaetano Campanile Mancini and Clotilde Fiore
- Writing career
- Language: Italian
- Genres: Novel; drama
- Notable works: Se la luna mi porta fortuna Agosto, moglie mia non ti conosco In campagna è un'altra cosa (c'è più gusto)
- Literary movement: Futurism; Novecento Italiano

Achille Campanile (Italian pronunciation: [aˈkille kam.paˈni.le]; 28 September 1899 – 4 January 1977) was an Italian writer, playwright, journalist and television critic known for his surreal humour and word play.

== Biography ==
Achille Campanile was born in Rome on 28 September 1899. His father was one of the editors of the newspaper La Tribuna. Always a prolific contributor to newspapers and periodicals, Campanile wrote for the newspapers La Tribuna, L'Idea Nazionale and the satirical magazine Il Travaso delle idee.

He became famous for his brief humorous dramatic pieces. In 1925 he published his first theatre work entitled L’inventore del cavallo which was a single-act play. His Futurist plays, such as Centocinquanta la gallina canta (1925), characterized by a taste for word play and surrealist nonsense, won critical acclaim.

He had more popular success with novels such as Ma che cos'è questo amore? (1927). Both his novels and plays show a passion for nonsense and linguistic ambiguity, although his surreal humour often disguises a strong critique of bourgeois mores.

His Tragedie in due battute (Tragedies in Two Cues) have been rediscovered by the avant-garde of the sixties and the early seventies and are considered anticipations of Theatre of the Absurd. Campanile was active in the post-war period as a television critic.

== Works ==
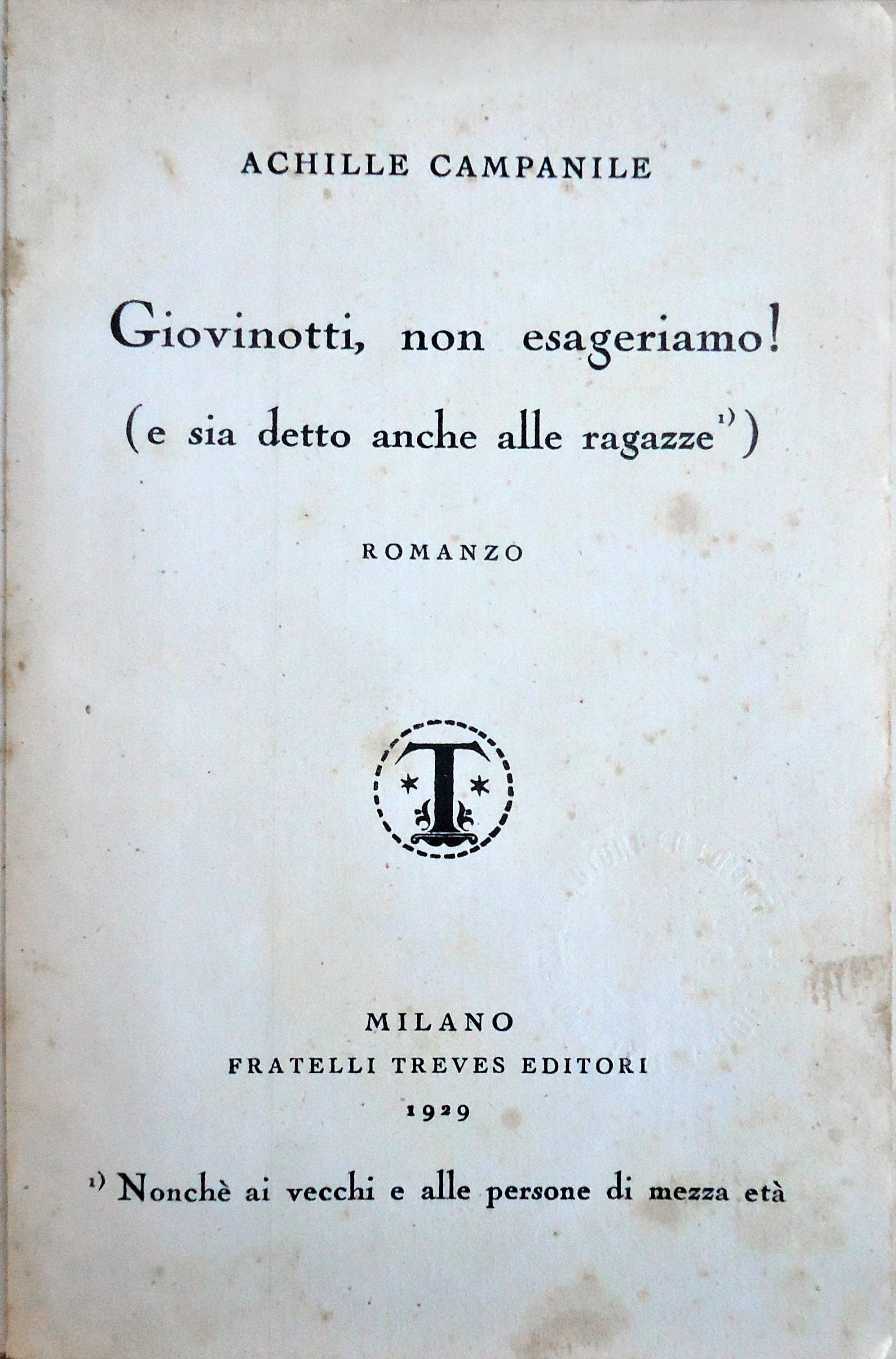
Achille Campanile, Giovinotti, non esageriamo!, 1929

- Ma che cos'è questo amore? (1924)
- Se la luna mi porta fortuna (1927)
- Agosto, moglie mia non ti conosco (1930)
- In campagna è un'altra cosa (1931)
- Cantilena all'angolo della strada (1933)
- Celestino e la famiglia Gentilissimi (1942)
- Il povero Piero (1959)
- Amiamoci in fretta (1962)
- L'inventore del cavallo e altre quindici commedie (1971)
- Manuale di conversazione (1973)
- Asparagi e immortalità dell'anima (1974)
- Vite degli uomini illustri (1975)
- L'eroe (1976)
- Tragedie in due battute (1978)

== Works available in English ==
- The inventor of the horse and two other short plays. Translated by Francesco Loriggio. Guernica. 1995. ISBN 9780920717974.

== Sources ==
- Luxardo Franchi, Piero (1988). "CAMPANILE, Achille". Dizionario Biografico degli Italiani (in Italian). Vol. 34: Primo supplemento A–C. Rome: Istituto dell'Enciclopedia Italiana. ISBN 978-88-12-00032-6.
