= Lacerba =

Defunct Italian literary journal (1913–1915)

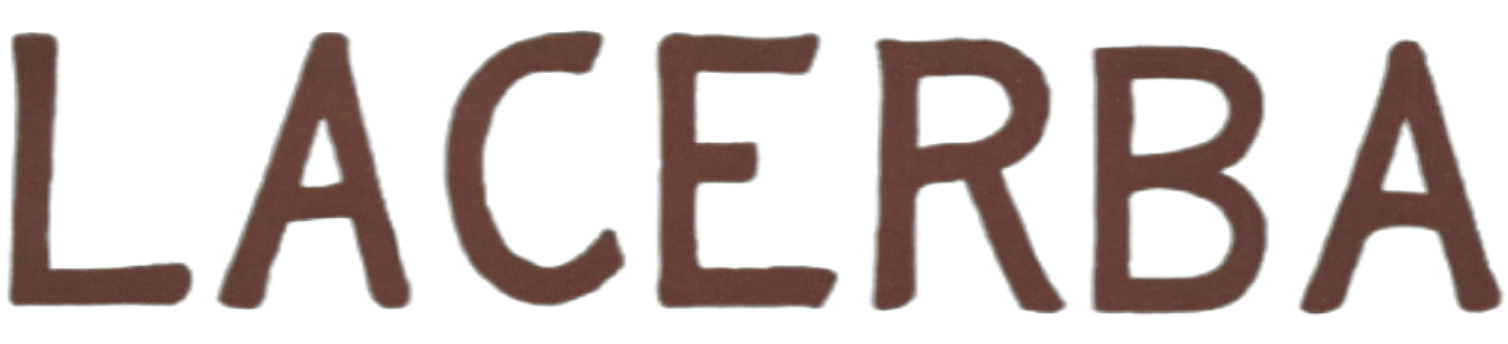

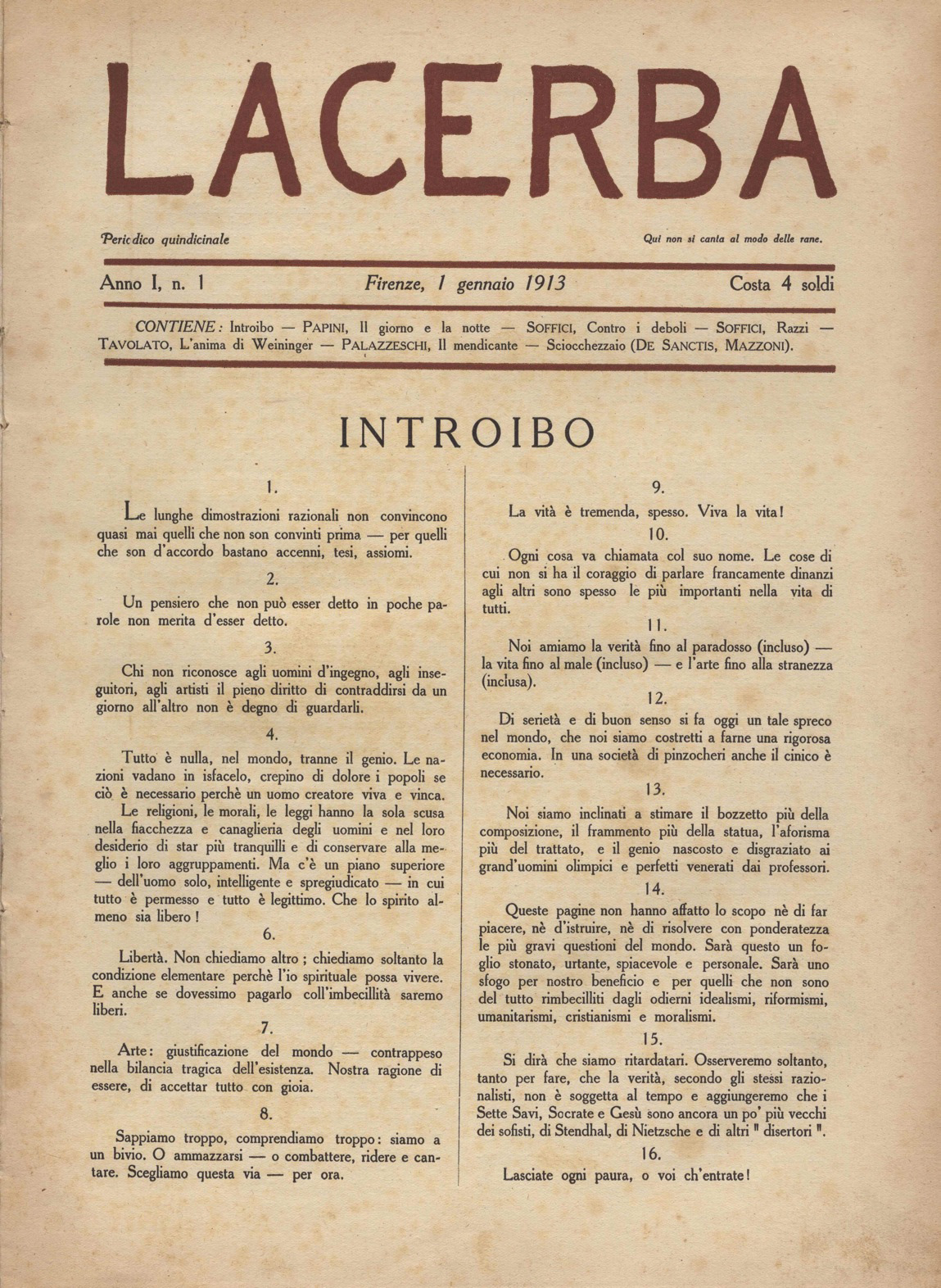
- First issue of Lacerba (1 January 1913)
- Founder: Ardengo Soffici; Giovanni Papini
- Founded: 1913
- First issue: 1 January 1913
- Final issue: 22 May 1915
- Based in: Florence
- Language: Italian

Lacerba was an Italian literary journal based in Florence closely associated with the Futurist movement. It published many Futurist manifestos by Filippo Marinetti, Antonio Sant'Elia, and others. The magazine was started as a fortnightly magazine on 1 January 1913. Its frequency was later changed to weekly. The paper had no official editor. Ardengo Soffici and Giovanni Papini were two of the principal contributors. Lacerba was one of the foremost avant-garde publications of early 20th-century Italy. Among its collaborators were Dino Campana, Aldo Palazzeschi, Corrado Govoni, Piero Jahier, Giuseppe Ungaretti, Umberto Boccioni, Carlo Carrà, Luigi Russolo and Guillaume Apollinaire.

== Background ==
The journal took its title from Cecco d'Ascoli's fourteenth-century poem Acerba. A staunch opponent of Dante and a victim of the Medieval Inquisition, Cecco d'Ascoli was seen as an anti-establishment symbol. In its first issue, the magazine set out its programme, calling for the complete freedom and autonomy of art, the anarchic exaltation of 'genius' and the 'übermensch', and a complete renewal of literature. Papini wrote provocative articles attacking the conformism of contemporary culture; Soffici wrote about artistic avant-gardes, such as Futurism and Cubism; Palazzeschi contributed irreverent poems such as 'A Little Crystal House', 'Postille' and 'Pizzicheria'; Italo Tavolato wrote iconosclastic articles such as 'In Praise of Prostitution' and 'Blasphemy Against Democracy'.

== History ==
From March 1913, the magazine began to feature contributions from the Futurists, who soon occupied prominent positions within it. Filippo Tommaso Marinetti, Luciano Folgore, Umberto Boccioni, Carlo Carrà and Corrado Govoni became frequent contributors. As a literary magazine that aimed to educate the public about the most advanced forms of modern art, Lacerba published several Futurist manifestos, including the Futurist Political Programme, followed by a postscript by Papini. This political manifesto was addressed to Futurist in view of the 1913 elections, the first to be held with universal suffrage in Italy. It invited voters to reject the liberal catholic list of Giovanni Giolitti and Ottorino Gentiloni, as well as the democratic, republican and socialist parties.

In February 1914, Papini began a polemic against Marinetti and his unquestioning faith in progress. By the end of 1914, Lacerba and the Futurist movement had definitively parted ways. Their collaboration had lasted a year, spanning 24 issues from March 1913 to March 1914.

Following the outbreak of World War I, Lacerba shifted from political disengagement to a strong pro-war editorial stance. From August 1914 onwards, the magazine devoted itself entirely to politics, advocating violent action against pacifists and socialists. In 1915, Giovanni Papini assumed sole control of the magazine, a role he had previously shared with Soffici, who continued to collaborate. Following Aldo Palazzeschi's return and the introduction of his regular column, 'Rubbish', literature and art were once again featured in the pages of Lacerba, alongside political articles. In February, an article bearing the signatures of Palazzeschi, Papini and Soffici (entitled 'Futurism and Marinettism') sealed the rift between the three Florentines, who proclaimed themselves to be the only authentic Futurists, and the Milanese Futurists, whom they disparagingly referred to as 'Marinettists'. This marked the end of the first phase of Florentine Futurism. The magazine ceased publication on 22 May 1915, two days before Italy's entry into the war.

== See also ==
- Poesia (magazine)

== Bibliography ==
- Somigli, Luca (2013). "Past-Loving Florence and the Temptation of Futurism". In Peter Brooker; et al. (eds.). The Oxford Critical and Cultural History of Modernist Magazines: Europe 1880-1940. Oxford: Oxford University Press. pp. 469–490. ISBN 978-0-19-965958-6.
