= Scarpelli =

Scarpelli is an Italian surname. Notable people with the surname include:

- Craig Scarpelli (born 1961), American soccer player
- Filiberto Scarpelli (1870–1933), Italian cartoonist
- Furio Scarpelli (1919–2010), Italian screenwriter
- Gerald Scarpelli (1938–1989), American mobster
- Giacomo Scarpelli (born 1956), Italian historian and screenwriter
- Glenn Scarpelli (born 1966), American actor and singer
- Henry Scarpelli (1930–2010), American comics artist
- Marco Scarpelli (1918–1995), Italian cinematographer
- Mathieu Scarpelli (born 1981), French footballer
- Umberto Scarpelli (1904–1980), Italian screenwriter and film director
