= Nicola Maldacea =

Italian actor (1870–1945)

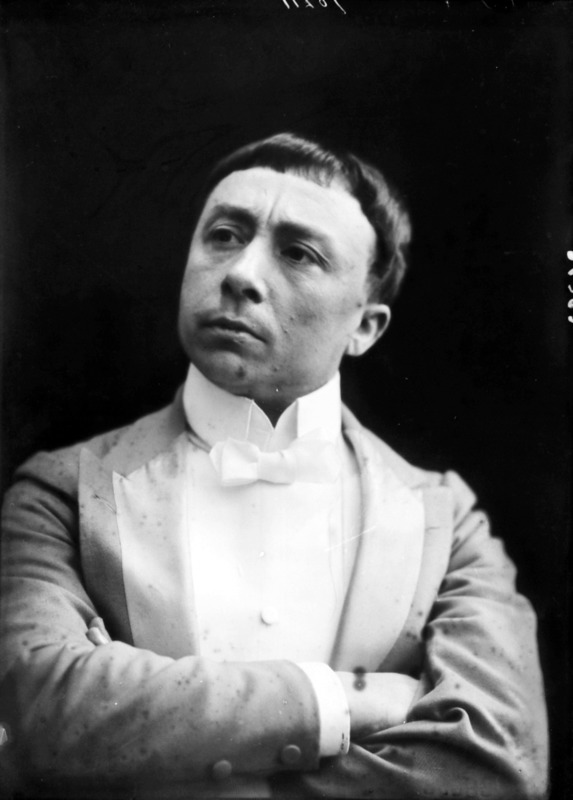
- Nicola Maldacea in a photo by Mario Nunes Vais
- Born: 29 October 1870; Naples, Italy
- Died: 5 March 1945 (aged 74); Rome, Italy
- Occupation: Actor
- Years active: 1935-1956

Nicola Maldacea (29 October 1870 – 5 March 1945) was an Italian actor, comedian and singer, well-known for his expertise in the theatrical genre of 'macchietta', where he was one of the pioneers. In the golden years of the café-chantant in Italy, between 1890 and 1920, Maldacea was the star who closed the show together with the prime donne who symbolised the Belle Époque such as Lina Cavalieri or La Belle Otero. He sang duets with national and international stars, such as Emilia Persico (it), Amina Vargas, Eugénie Fougère, La Tortajada, Lucy Nanon, and above all with the Neapolitan Amelia Faraone (it), but also led his own theatre companies.

== Career ==
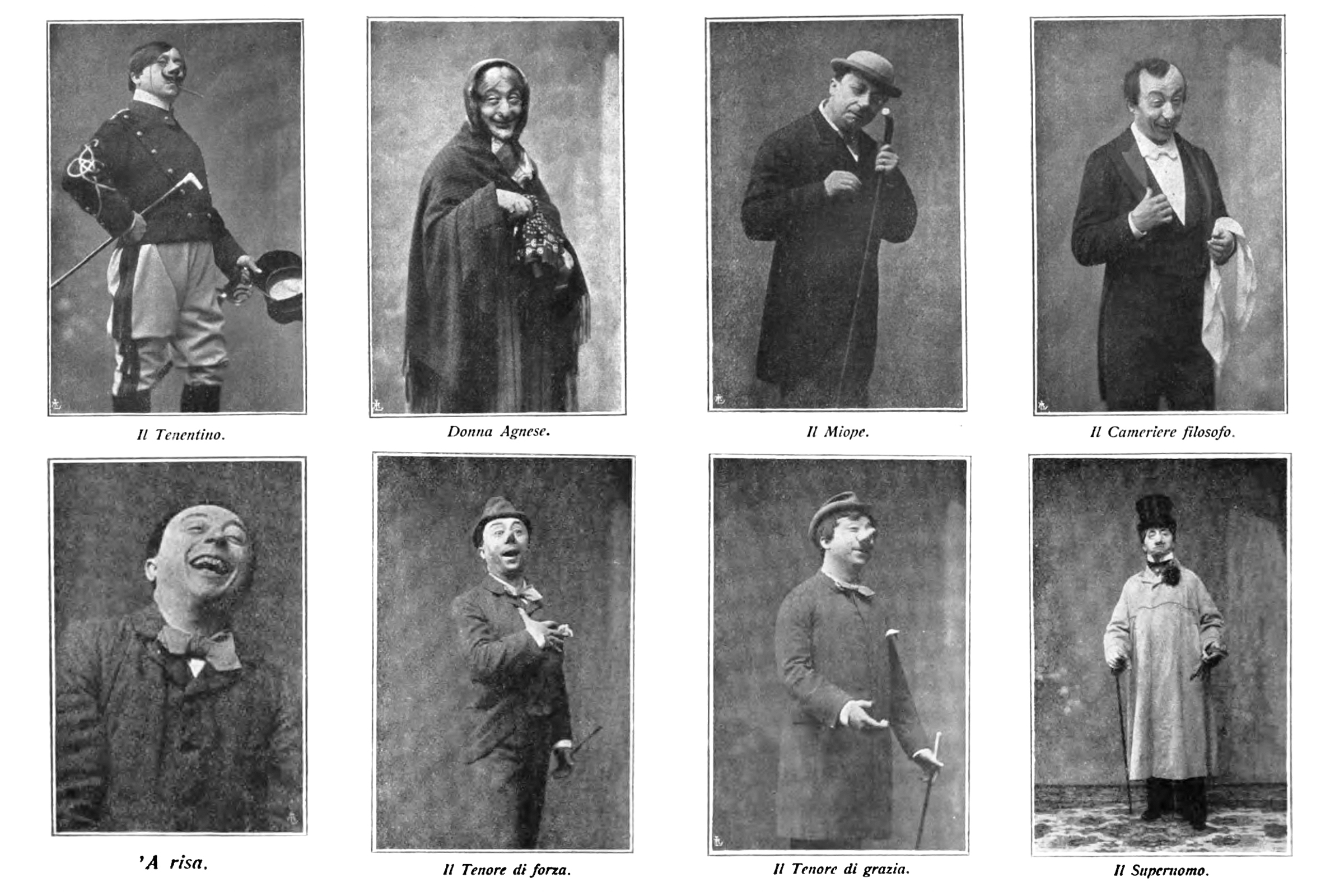
Nicola Maldecea performing some of his most renowned macchiette

Born to an elementary schoolteacher with origins in Cosenza, Nicola Maldacea embarked upon his theatrical career in his hometown, making his debut at a very young age on the stages of variety shows and café-chantants.

Possessing a robust vocal prowess, Maldacea initiated his career as a canzonettista (a traveling singer of popular songs), performing in venues across the province of Naples. This eventually led him to write for theatrical companies helmed by Eduardo Scarpetta and Gennaro Pantalena, affording him the opportunity to gain recognition and eventually play at the Salone Margherita (it) in Naples.

The recitative style he adopted during his performances prompted Maldacea to provide a satirical interpretation conducive to caricaturing the characters he embodied. This gave birth to the macchiette genere, which Maldacea himself described as follows:

Like a draftsman, I committed myself to give the audience an immediate impression by sketching the character, marking it quickly, highlighting its distinctive features. Hence the origin of the word 'macchietta,' which belongs to the figurative arts: a hasty sketch that, with a few strokes, conveys a place or a person in such a way as to provide an effective impression with the utmost caricatural spontaneity.

— Nicola Maldacea

In this context, critical reception leaned toward favorability praise. The Gazzetta Musicale di Milano (Musical Gazette of Milan), published by Ricordi in December 1903, rendered the following portrayal:

Macchietta is no easy feat: it requires keen powers of observation and intuition, a sense of proportion, and perfect elocution. Maldacea on stage is a living cinematograph: he is the caricaturist and the caricature. [...] The only true type for reproducing the macchietta, [...] the voice, the stage, the meticulously precise study in imitating, in the smallest details, the character he embodies; prodigious speed in changing makeup, clothing, accessories: in short, he is a masterful transformist, like Fregoli, a consummate monologist.

— Gazzetta Musicale di Milano (1903)

In the era preceding the outbreak of the First World War, Maldacea garnered acclaim within the theaters Southern and Northern Italy, solidifying his status as one of the preeminent comedy actors in the country. Among his most renowned portrayals were characters and macchiette such as "Il Conte Flick", "'O jettatore", "il Superuomo", "'O Rusecatore" and "l'Elegante" with music composed by Vincenzo Valente and Salvatore Gambardella. These macchiette were frequently written by authors such as Salvatore Di Giacomo, Trilussa, Rocco Galdieri, and others, who frequently wrote specifically for Maldacea.

He also appeared in cinema, in more than sixty films from 1935 to 1956.

Maldacea passed away in Rome on March 5, 1945. The city of Naples transferred his remains from Rome to the Cemetery of Poggioreale.

== Selected filmography ==
Year	Title	Role
1942	Once a Week	Signor Notti
1943	Maria Malibran	
1942	Girl of the Golden West	Carmen
1941	First Love	
1940	Lucrezia Borgia	Cosimo
1939	Naples Will Never Die	
1939	Marionette	
1939	The Widow	Gennarino
1938	Naples of Olden Times	Nicola
1938	Luciano Serra, Pilot	
1937	The Ferocious Saladin	
1937	We Were Seven Sisters	
1937	I've Lost My Husband!	Giuseppe
1937	Fermo con le mani	
1935	The Joker King	
1935	Naples in Green and Blue	
