= Luciano Folgore =

Italian poet and author (1888–1966)

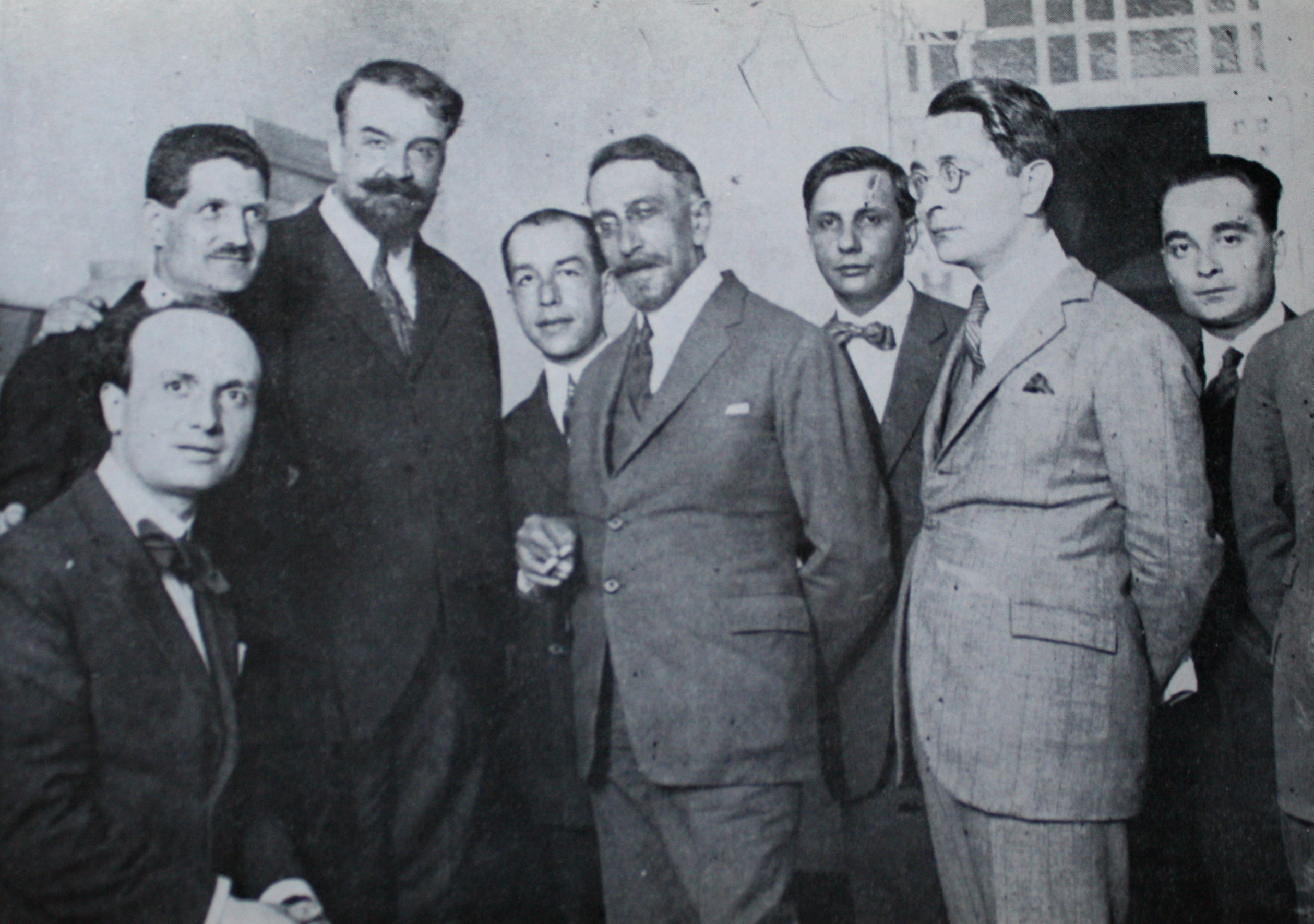
Luciano Folgore (sixth from the left) with Gino Gori, Giuseppe Navone and Nicola Moscardelli

Omero Vecchi (18 June 1888 – 24 May 1966), known by his pen name Luciano Folgore, was an Italian poet.

== Biography ==
Luciano Folgore wrote poems using pen names from a young age. Particularly appreciated by Filippo Marinetti he adhered to Futurism and some of his poems were published in the Anthology I poeti futuristi (1912). He collaborated with the historical magazines Lacerba and La voce. He also contributed to satirical magazine Il Travoso in the 1930s. In his futuristic collection of poetry Il canto dei motori (1912) he used a traditional, decadent language to describe the modern world of machines.

== Works ==
=== Poetry ===
- Il canto dei motori, Edizione di "Poesia", Milan, 1912
- Ponti sull'Oceano, Edizione di "Poesia", Milan, 1914
- Città veloce, Edizione "La Voce", Rome, 1919
- Poeti controluce, F. Campitelli, Foligno, 1922
- Poeti allo specchio, F. Campitelli, Foligno, 1926
- Musa vagabonda, F. Campitelli, Foligno, 1927
- Liriche, F. Campitelli, Foligno, 1930
- Il libro degli epigrammi, F. Campitelli, Rome, 1932
- Favolette e strambotti, Ceschina, Milan, 1934
- Novellieri allo specchio; parodie di D'Annunzio e altri, Ceschina, Milan, 1935
- Mamma voglio l'arcobaleno. Poesie per bambini, grandi e piccini, Magi-Spinetti, Rome, 1947

=== Prose ===
- Graffa, l'impermeabile, Mondadori, Milan, 1923
- Nuda ma dipinta, F. Campitelli, Foligno, 1924
- La città dei girasoli, Arnoldo Mondadori Editore, Milan, 1924
- La trappola colorata, Milan, 1934

== Bibliography ==
- Pietro Pancrazi, Futurismo, Luciano Folgore, in «Adriatico», 10 ottobre 1912.
- Giuseppe De Robertis, Luciano Folgore, in «La Voce», gennaio 1916.
- Giovanni Papini e Pietro Pancrazi, Poeti d'oggi (1900-1920), Firenze, Vallecchi, 1920.
- Emilio Cecchi, Poeti controluce, in «La tribuna», 6 ottobre 1922.
- Francesco Flora, Dal Romanticismo al Futurismo, Milano, Mondadori, 1925.
- Pietro Pancrazi, Poeti allo specchio, in «Corriere della sera», 17 marzo 1926.
- Giovanni Titta Rosa, Parodisti, in «Fiera letteraria», 20 maggio 1927.
- Luigi Tonelli, Luciano Folgore, in «L'Italia che scrive», agosto-settembre 1935.
- Lionello Fiumi, Parnaso amico. Saggio su alcuni poeti italiani del secolo XX, Genova, Edizioni Emiliano degli Orfini, 1942.
- Mario Apollonio, Letteratura dei contemporanei, Brescia, La Scuola, 1956.
- Giorgio Bàrberi Squarotti, Folgore Luciano, in Grande dizionario enciclopedico, Torino, UTET, 1956.
- Giovanni Titta Rosa, Il Futurismo e Folgore, in «Osservatore politico-letterario», settembre 1958.
- Elio Filippo Accrocca, Ritratti su misura, Venezia, Sodalizio del libro, 1960.
- Alberto Viviani, Giubbe rosse, Firenze, Giunti-Barbera, 1964.
- Mario Apollonio, Futurismo, Milano, Mazzotta, 1970.
- Maria Carla Papini, Omero Vecchi in Luciano Folgore, in «Paragone», n. 274, dicembre 1972.
- Maria Carla Papini, Luciano Folgore, in Letteratura italiana. I Critici, volume quarto, Milano, Marzorati, 1974.
