= Il padiglione delle meraviglie =

Il padiglione delle meraviglie is a 1924 comic opera in two parts by Ettore Petrolini. It premiered at the Teatro Verdi in Vicenza on 30 November 1924 and was performed by the Piazza Pepe. The protagonist is Tiberio.
