= Tione degli Abruzzi =

- Comune
- Comune di Tione degli Abruzzi
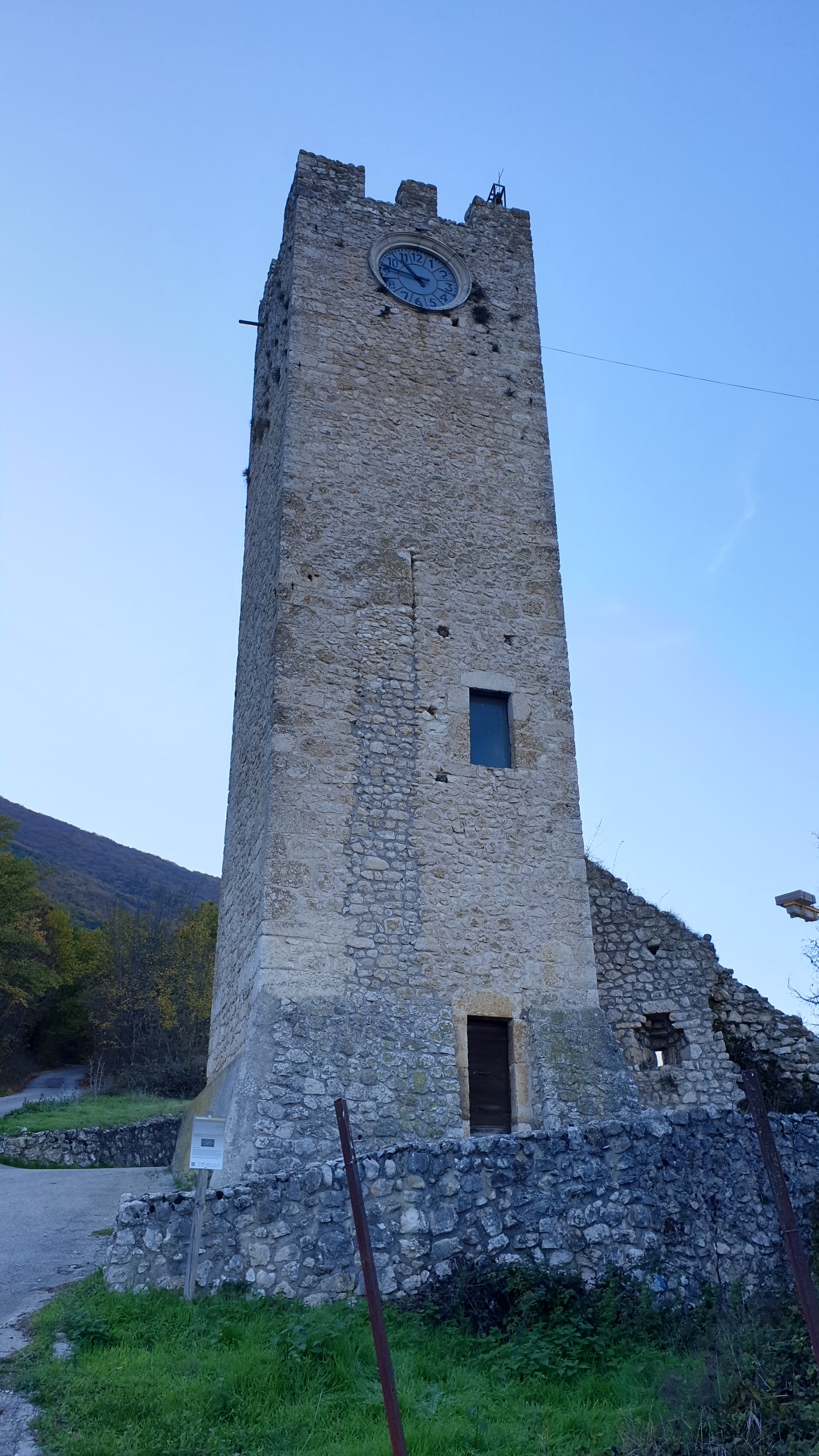

- Location within Italy Location within Abruzzo
- Coordinates: 42°12′18″N 13°38′12″E
- Country: Italy
- Region: Abruzzo
- Province: L'Aquila (AQ)
- Frazioni: Goriano Valli, Santa Maria del Ponte, Villa Grande

Government
  - Mayor: Stefania Mariani

Area
  - Total: 40.42 km^{2} (15.61 sq mi)
- Elevation: 581 m (1,906 ft)

Population (1 January 2007)
  - Total: 343
  - Density: 8.49/km^{2} (22.0/sq mi)
- Demonym: Tionesi
- Time zone: UTC+1 (CET)
  - Summer (DST): UTC+2 (CEST)
- Postal code: 67020
- Dialing code: 0862
- Saint day: 6 December

Tione degli Abruzzi (Abruzzese: U Tionë) is a comune in the province of L'Aquila in the Abruzzo, region of Italy.

== Transport ==
Tione degli Abruzzi has a stop on the Terni–Sulmona railway, with trains to L'Aquila and Sulmona.
