= Macchietta =

Italian form of comedy act

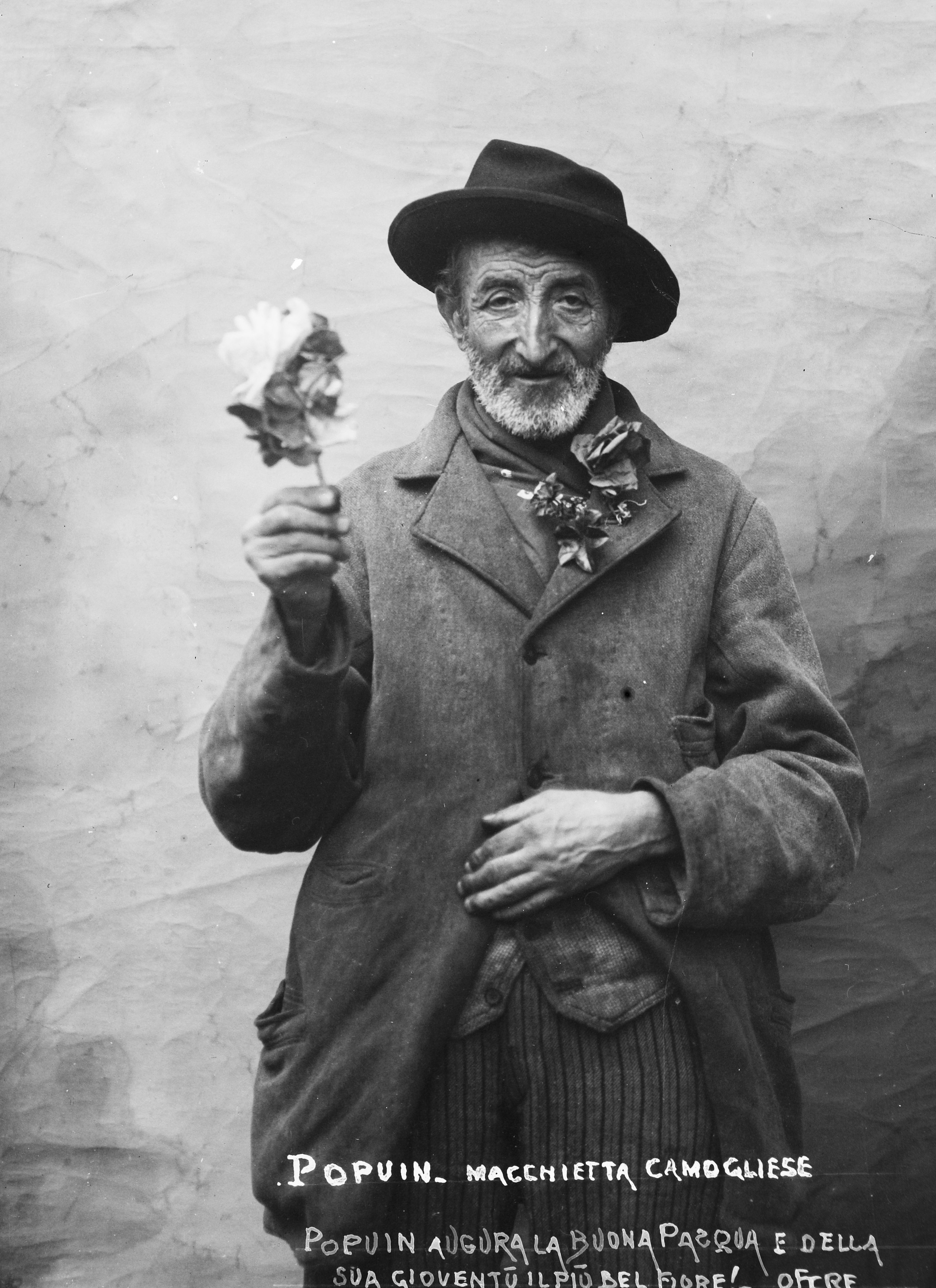
"Popuin", macchietta from Camogli, Liguria, late nineteenth century. The caption ironically asserts: "Popuin wishes a happy Easter and offers the most beautiful flower of his youth!".

Macchietta (English: "little spot"; pl.: macchiette or macchiettas) is a form of comedy act which was common in Italian theatre between the late 1800s and the second half of the 1900s.

== Style ==
The macchietta consisted in comic musical monologues caricaturing stock characters. It was generally committed to the observation of reality, and it sketched characters featuring particular defects or manias, which were further deformed and exaggerated for comical and satirical effects. Every monologue had some music serving as backdrop for the whole performance and the acting was interspersed by brief couplets sung by the comedian.

== History ==
Macchiette were performed in café-chantants, revues and avanspettacolo, and less frequently as part of more elaborate comedy plays. After a golden age between the late 1800s and early 1900s, the genre apparently went out of fashion around 1920, before being resurrected in an amended and updated form in the 1930s, mostly thanks to the duo formed by Gigi Pisano and Giuseppe Cioffi, who created a series of popular macchiette such as "Ciccio Formaggio", "Mazza Pezza e Pizzo" and "Datemi Elisabetta", which were successfully performed by the most popular comedians of the time.

Starting from the 1950s, the genre eventually declined and gradually disappeared together with the decline of avanspettacolo.

== Actors ==
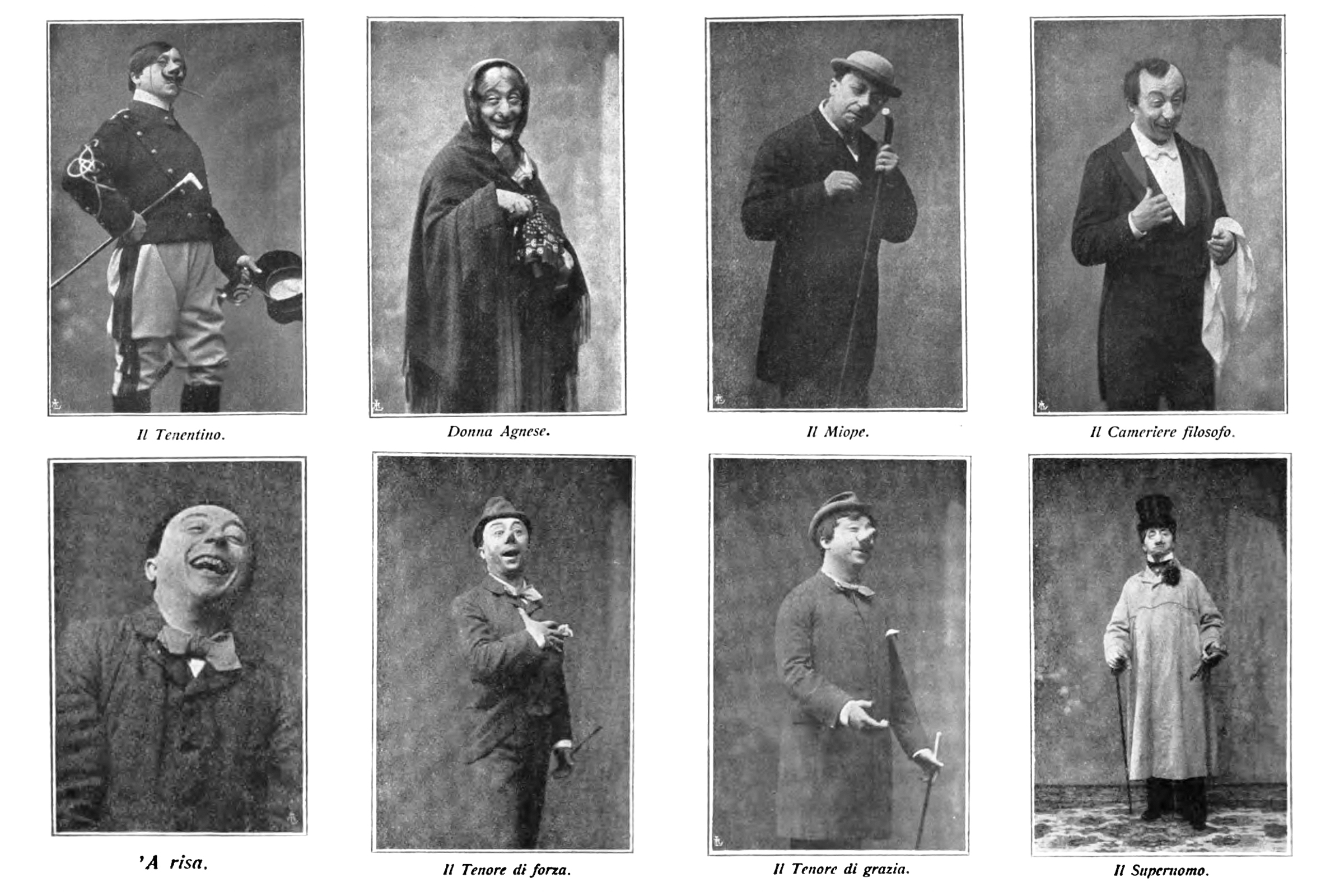
A series of photographs by Luca Comerio in which Nicola Maldacea performs in some of his most famous macchiette

Nicola Maldacea was among the first actors to adopt the genre, and he is regarded as the figure who mostly helped to canonize the macchietta, if not its inventor. He himself regarded himself as the person who coined the term. Some of his macchiette had notable poets such as Trilussa, Salvatore Di Giacomo and Libero Bovio as often uncredited authors.

Other well-known artists specialized in this form of entertainment were the Milan-based actor and playwright Edoardo Ferravilla, the Neapolitans Raffaele Viviani and Berardo Cantalamessa (creator of the classical macchietta "La risata"), and the Roman Ettore Petrolini.
