= Teatro Ambra Jovinelli =

Theatre in Rome, Italy

Coordinates: 41.8956°N 12.5080°E

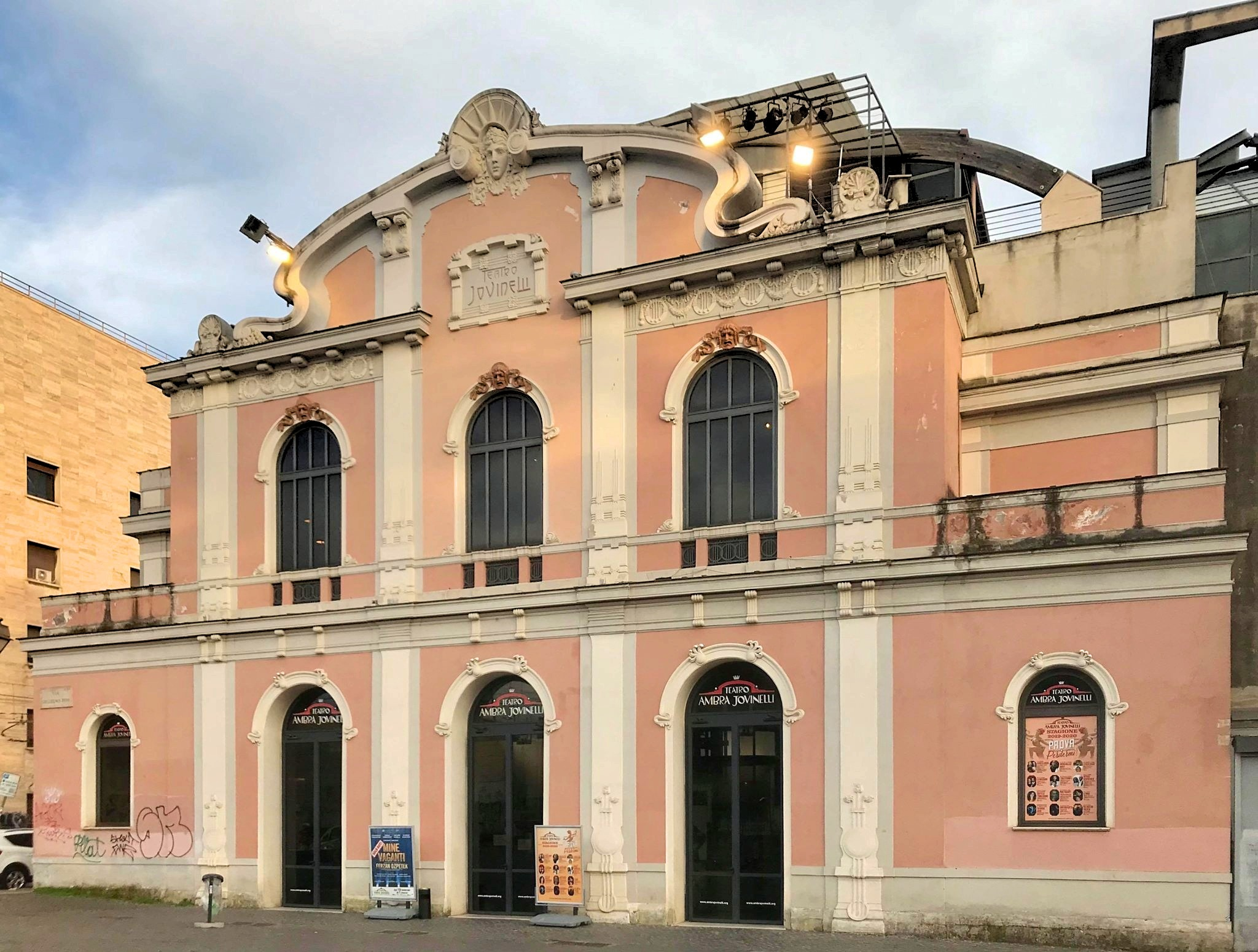
Teatro Ambra Jovinelli

The Teatro Ambra Jovinelli (literally "Ambra Jovinelli Theater"), formerly known just as Teatro Jovinelli, is a theatre located in Rome, Italy.

It was founded by the theater organizer Giuseppe Jovinelli, who intended to build a theater devoted to variety and comic representations which had a luxurious face and which appeared stylistically rich and noble.

Built in the ancient Esquilino quarter, construction work began in 1906 and the inauguration took place in 1909.
