= Cecco d'Ascoli =

Italian physician and poet (1257–1327)

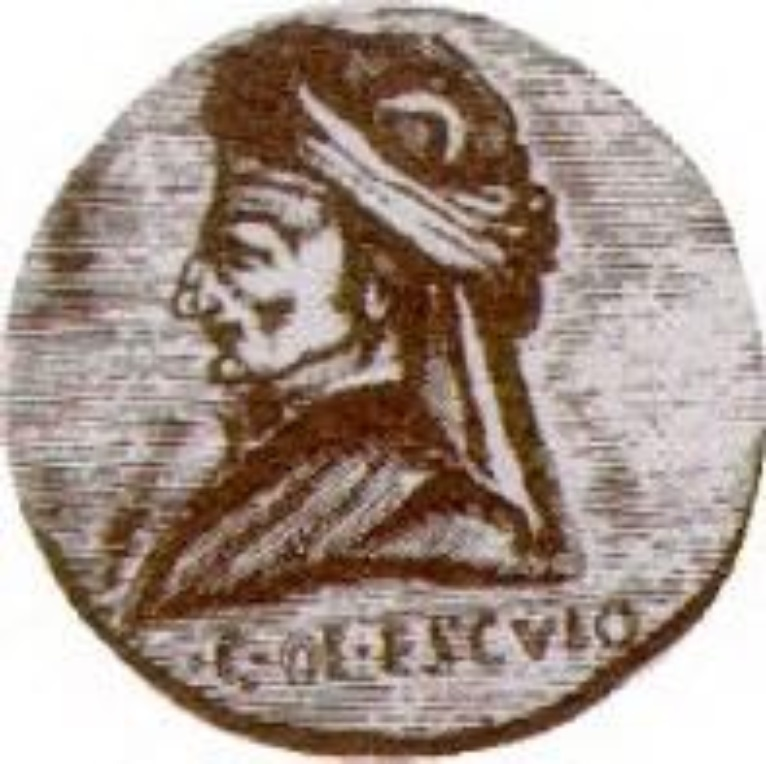
- Born: 1257; Folignano
- Died: 26 September 1327 (aged 69–70); Florence

Academic work
- Discipline: astrology
- Institutions: University of Bologna
- Notable works: Acerba

Francesco degli Stabili (1257 – 26 September 1327; sometimes given as Francesco degli Stabili Cichus), popularly called Cecco d'Ascoli, was an Italian encyclopaedist, physician and poet. Cecco (in Latin, Cichus) is the diminutive of Francesco. Ascoli was the place of his birth. The lunar crater Cichus is named after him.

== Life ==
Born in Folignano, near Fonte a cagnà in Case di Coccia, he devoted himself to the study of mathematics and astrology. In 1322, he was made professor of astrology at the University of Bologna. It is alleged that he entered the service of Pope John XXII at Avignon, and that he cultivated the acquaintance of Dante only to quarrel with the great poet afterwards; but of this there is no evidence.

Having published a commentary on the Sphere of John de Sacrobosco, in which he propounded audacious theories concerning the employment and agency of demons, he got into difficulties with the clerical party, and was condemned in 1324 to certain fasts and prayers, and to the payment of a fine of seventy crowns. To elude this sentence, he went to Florence, where he was attached to the household of Carlo di Calabria. His pseudo-science and plain speaking had made him many enemies; he had attacked the Commedia of Dante, and the Canzone d'amore of Guido Cavalcanti. The physician Dino del Garbo was indefatigable in pursuit of him; and the old accusation of impiety being renewed, Cecco was again tried and sentenced for relapse into heresy. He was burned at Florence the day after the sentence, in his seventieth year.

== Publications ==
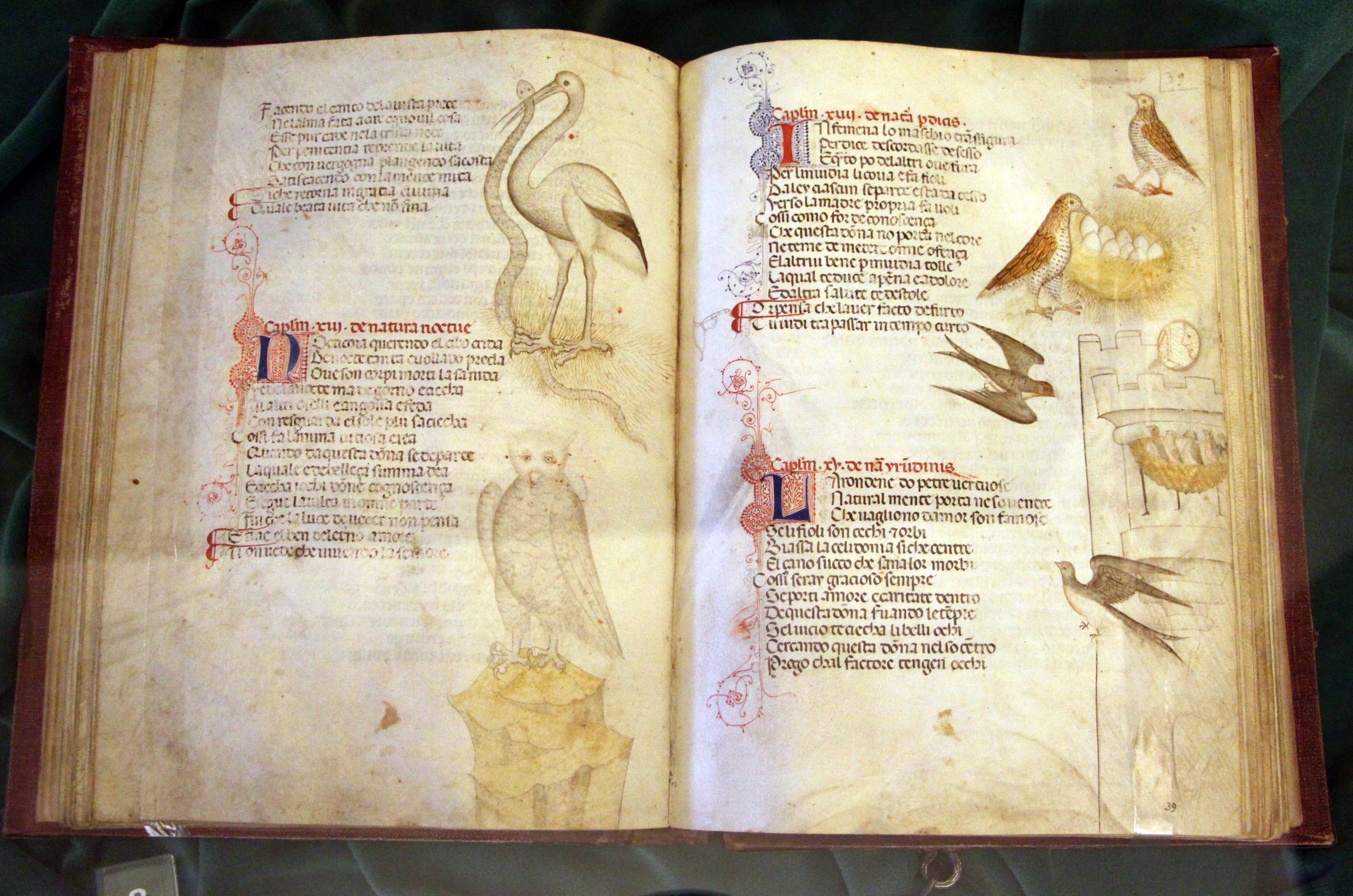
Liber acerbe etatis, XIV sec., Biblioteca Medicea Laurenziana, pluteo 38v 01

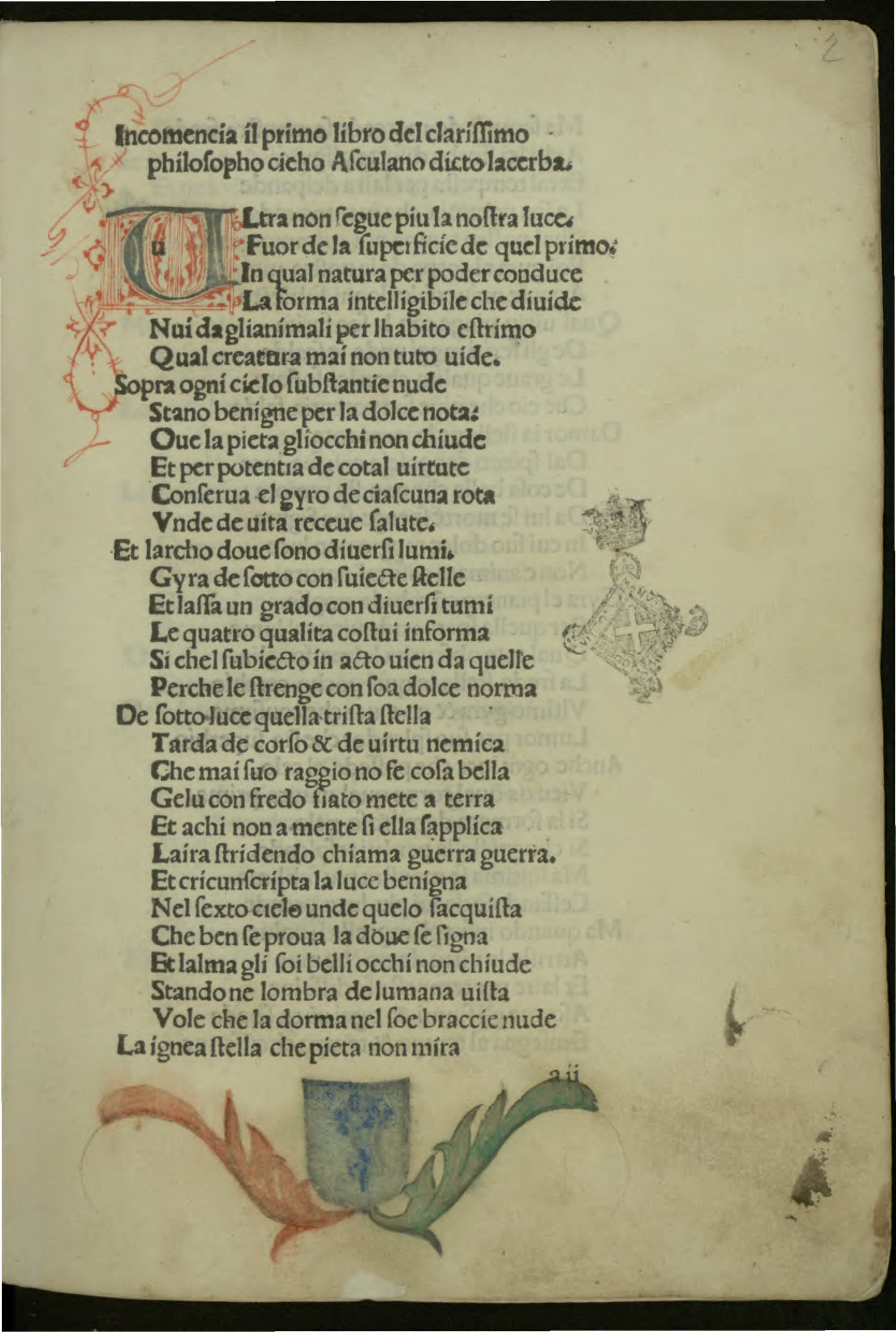
Incipit of Acerba, 1484

Cecco d'Ascoli left many works in manuscript, most of which have never been published. The book by which he achieved his renown and which contributed to his execution was the Acerba (from acervus), an encyclopaedic poem, of which in 1546, the date of the last reprint, more than twenty editions had been issued. It is a compendium for the contemporary natural science of the time, including "the order and influences of the heavens, the characteristics and properties of animals and precious stones, the causes of phenomena such as meteors and earthquakes—and of commonplace moral philosophy". The work actually consists of four books in sesta rima (six-line stanzas in a specific rhyming scheme). The first book treats of astronomy and meteorology; the second of astrology, of physiognomy, and of the vices and virtues; the third of minerals and of the love of animals; while the fourth propounds and solves a number of moral and physical problems. Of a fifth book, on theology, the initial chapter alone was completed.

== Works ==
- Illustre poeta Ceco d'Ascoli con comento (in Italian). Venezia: Candido Bindoni. 1550.

== Bibliography ==
- Marco Albertazzi, ed. (2005). Acerba etas. Trento: La Finestra editrice.
- Marco Albertazzi, ed. (2002). Studi stabiliani. Trento: La Finestra editrice.
- Ferrilli, Sara (2019). "STABILI, Francesco". Dizionario Biografico degli Italiani (in Italian). Vol. 93: Sisto V–Stammati. Rome: Istituto dell'Enciclopedia Italiana. ISBN 978-88-12-00032-6.
- Thorndike, Lynn (1934). History of Magic and Experimental Science, vol. 2. New York: MacMillan. pp. 953–4, 959.
