= Il Travaso delle idee =

Italian weekly satirical magazine (1900–1966)

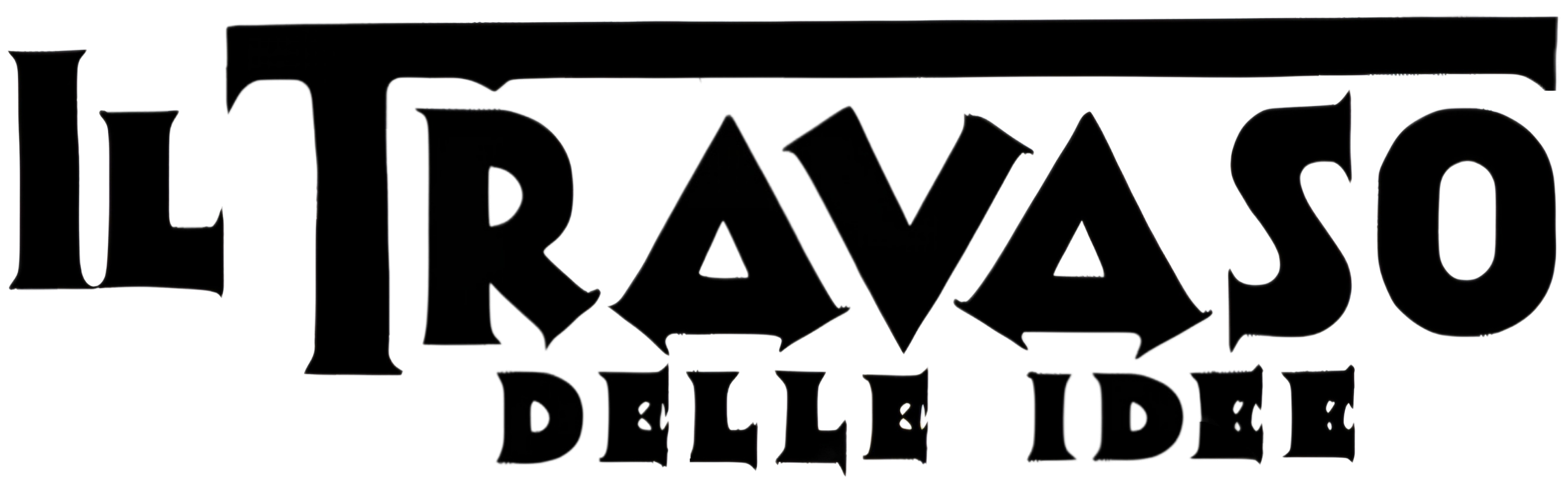
- Categories: Satirical magazine
- Frequency: Weekly
- Publisher: Giornale d'ltalia
- Founded: 1900
- Final issue: 1966
- Country: Italy
- Based in: Rome
- Language: Italian
- OCLC: 173693810

Il Travaso delle idee (Italian: The Decanter of Ideas), also known just as Il Travaso, was a satirical magazine which was in circulation between 1900 and 1966 with an interruption in the period 1944–1946. Its subtitle was Organo ufficiale delle persone intelligenti (Italian: Official Organ of Intelligent People). The magazine was headquartered in Rome, Italy.

== History and profile ==
Il Travaso was launched in 1900 and had its headquarters in Rome. The magazine temporarily ceased publication in 1944 when the fascist rule in Italy ended. It was restarted in Rome in 1946 and published until 1966.

Il Travaso was published by Giornale d'ltalia on a weekly basis. The company was owned by Filiberto Scarpelli, Carlo Montani and Enrico Novelli. The Italian cartoonist Guglielmo ‘Guasta’ Guastaveglia served as the editor of the magazine twice. He was first named as its editor in 1921 and held the post until his dismissal in 1925 due to his antifascist leaning. Guastaveglia was again appointed to the post in 1946 and edited Il Travaso until 1962.

Il Travaso featured cartoons and political satire and adopted a moderate-conservative political stance. In the period between 1952 and 1953 its political leaning was described as nationalistic. Some of the contributors were futurist artists, including Luciano Folgore. Two volumes of Il Travaso were dedicated to futurism which were published on 11 January 1931 and on 24 September 1933. The magazine had readers from different social classes.

During the fascist period in Italy Il Travaso published antisemitic materials which also included a violent version of the religious antisemitism. For instance, in April 1938 a poem by the 19th century Italian poet Giacommo Belli was published in the weekly which claimed that Jews were the murderers of Jesus and that it was legitimate to hate them. Following the racial laws the magazine featured antisemitic caricatures between the late November and the mid-December in 1938 presenting the Jews as a social and economic burden.

The magazine sold 150,000 copies in 1952–1953. In the 1950s Benito Jacovitti, a well-known Italian cartoonist, was one of the contributors of Il Travaso. Another contributor was Achille Campanile.

== See also ==
- List of magazines in Italy
