= Acerba (book) =

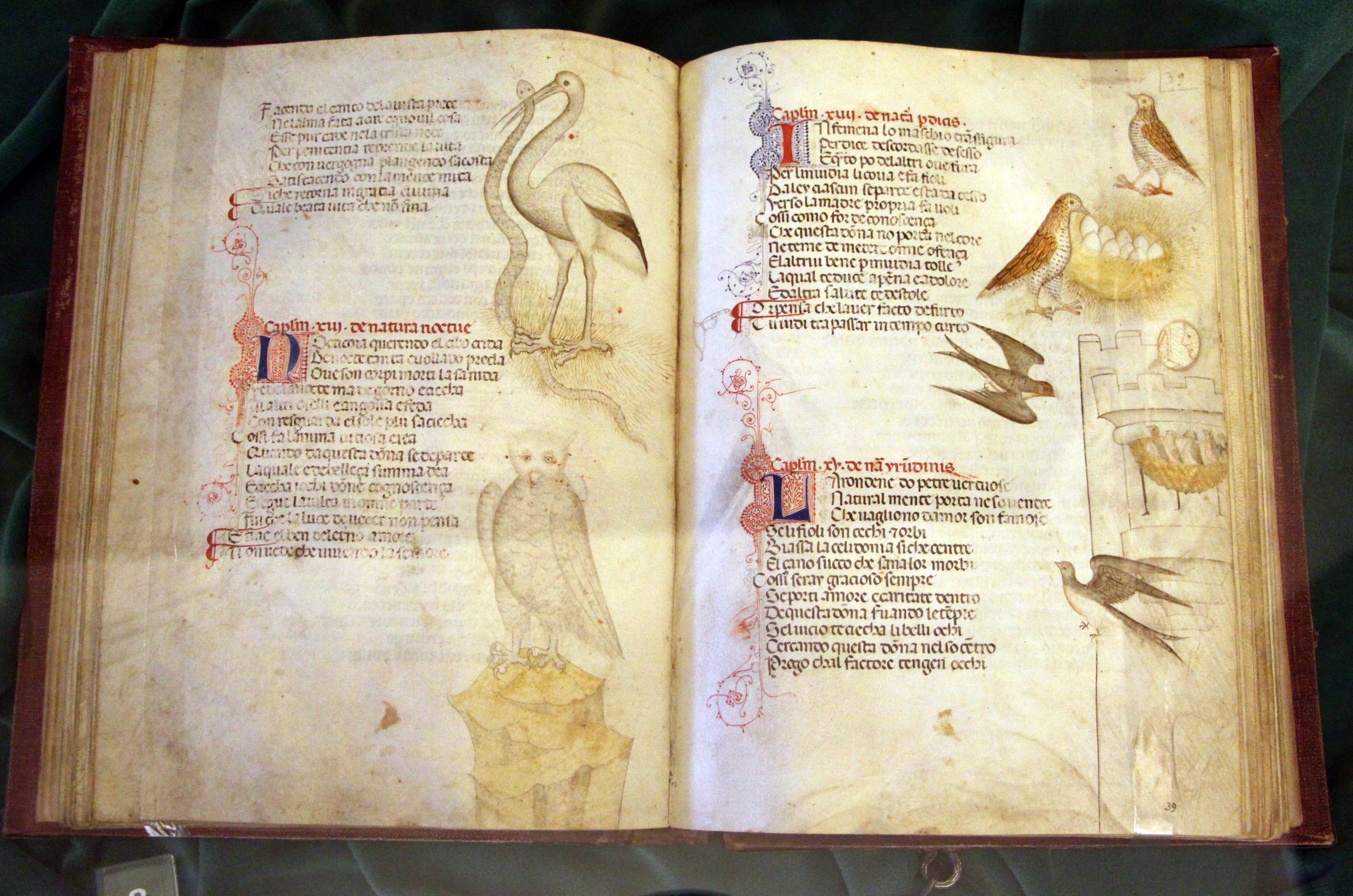
Liber acerbe etatis, XIV sec., Biblioteca Medicea Laurenziana, pluteo 38v 01

The Acerba (from acervus) was an encyclopaedic poem by Cecco d'Ascoli. It was printed in more than twenty editions - the least faulty of them is that of Venice, dated 1510. The earliest known, which has become exceedingly rare, is that of Brescia, which has no date, but is ascribed to ca. 1473. The final edition of the work was printed in 1546.

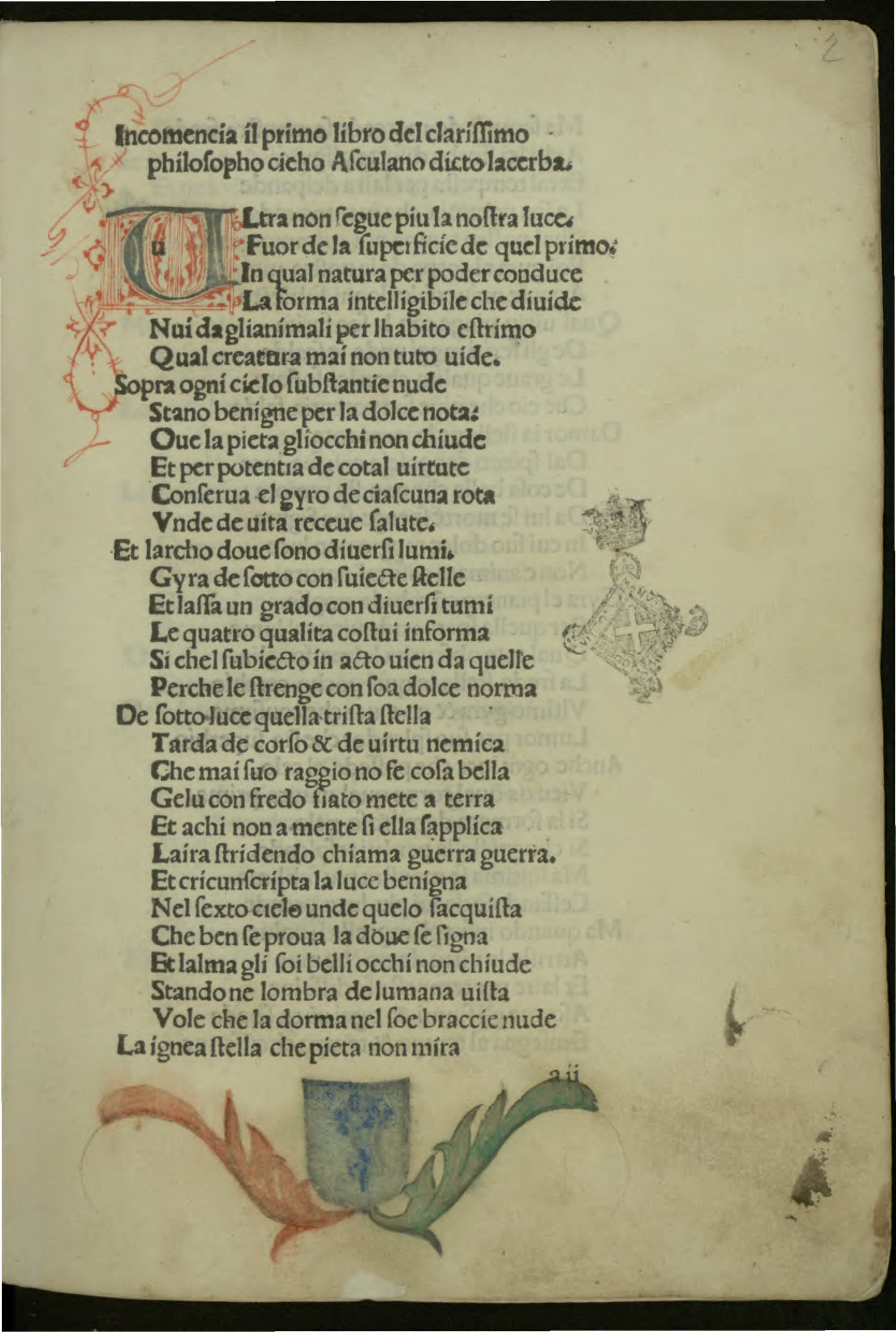
Incipit of Acerba, 1484

It is unfinished, and consists of 4,865 verses in sesta rima in four volumes. The first volume treats of astronomy and meteorology; the second of stellar influences, of physiognomy, and of the vices and virtues; the third of minerals and of the love of animals; while the fourth propounds and solves a number of moral and physical problems. The fifth volume was on theology, but only its first chapter was completed.

Basing his knowledge on experimentation and observation, Cecco knew of metallic aerolites and shooting stars, explained dew and possibly the circulation of the blood and accounted for fossil plants through mountain-forming revolutions of the earth.

== Bibliography ==
- L'Acerba - Acerba etas - Latin Commentary - Vulgar Commentary - Sonnets, edited by Marco Albertazzi, Trento, La Finestra editrice 2002. CD-Rom inside with Sessa edition, 1501.
