= Adolfo Scarselli =

Italian painter

Adolfo Scarselli (1866–1945) was an Italian painter.

== Biography ==
He was born and resided in Florence. He studied for three years design at the Professional School for Decorative Industrial Arts. He was awarded a scholarship to study for three years at the Academy of Fine Arts; and obtained his license from the Institute, attending under professor Giovanni Fattori. He made portraits of particular individuals. He also painted small canvases with vedute of the Mercato Vecchio, one of which he exhibited two years later at the Promotrice. He exhibited at the 1887 Exhibition of Fine Arts in Florence, sketches done from real life, some in oil and some in watercolor. Afterwards in 1889, he exhibited a large canvas again of the nostalgic view of the Mercato Vecchio of Florence. The Mercato Vecchio, to the dismay of many traditionalists, had been destroyed during the urban renewal (Risanamento) during 1885–1990 to make way for the Piazza della Repubblica. Such actions stirred the emotions of Romantic painters aiming to preserve the buildings of the past. He exhibited also at the Mostra of 1890–91: Guardiana di uva; Sull' Arno. At the 1891 Artist's Circle of Florence, in an exhibition of sketches by principal Florentine artists of the time, he displayed : Una scena del vecchio mercato; and the painting: Fra gli scambi: Savonarola refuses Absolution to Lorenzo il Magnifico; Trecciaiuola; Padule avanti la pioggia; and other such paintings.
