= Santa Maria del Ponte =

Coordinates: 42°12′32″N 13°38′39″E

- Frazione
- Santa Maria del Ponte
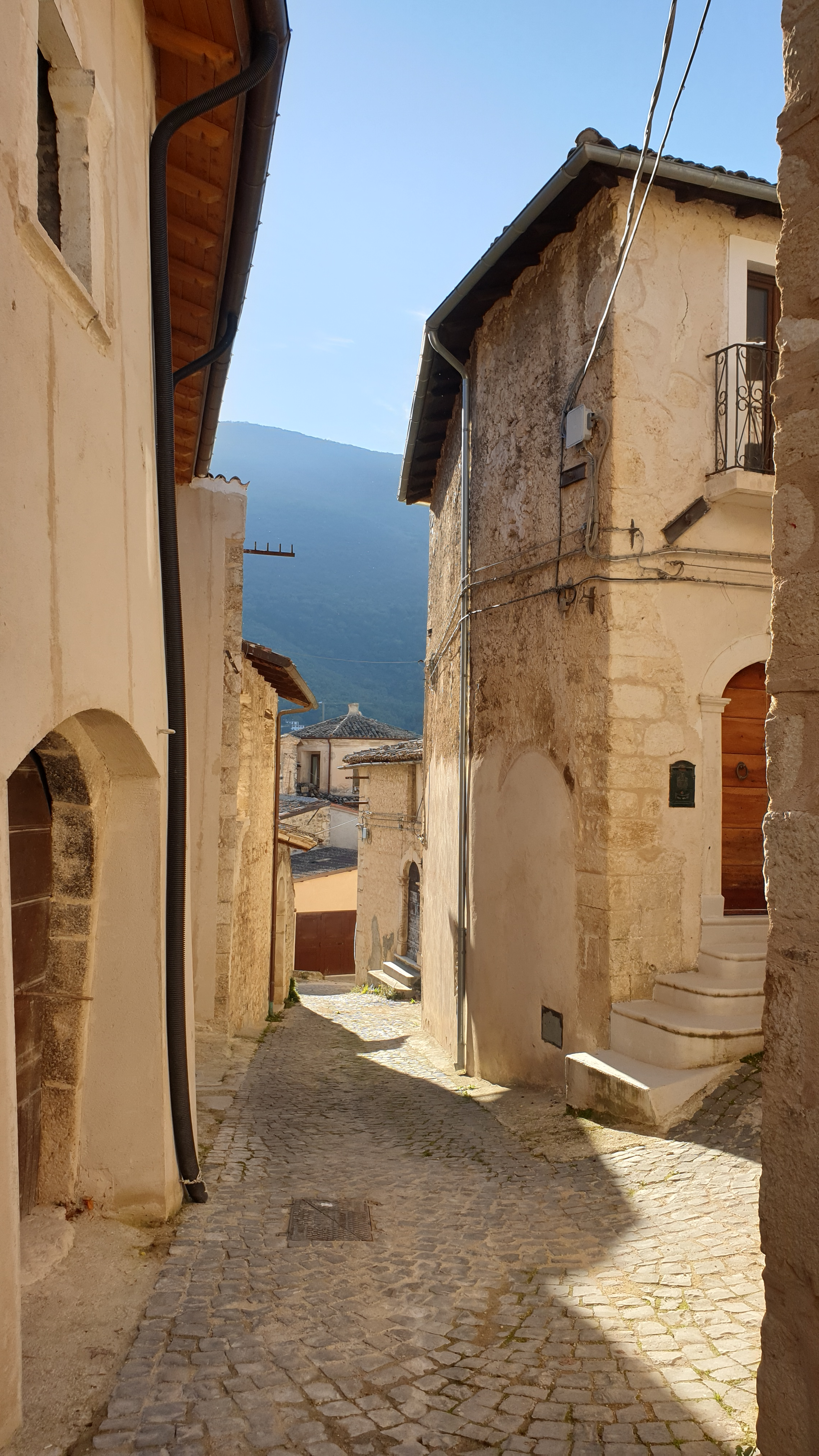

- Flag
- Interactive map of Santa Maria del Ponte
- Country: Italy
- Region: Abruzzo
- Province: L'Aquila
- Commune: Tione degli Abruzzi
- Time zone: UTC+1 (CET)
  - Summer (DST): UTC+2 (CEST)
- Postal code: 67020
- Area code: 0862

Santa Maria del Ponte is a frazione: A type of hamlet of the municipality Tione degli Abruzzi, in the Abruzzo, region of Italy. It lies on the slopes, surrounded by the Subequana Valley, positioned between L'Aquila and Sulmona.
