= Vamba =

Italian journalist and writer (1858–1920)

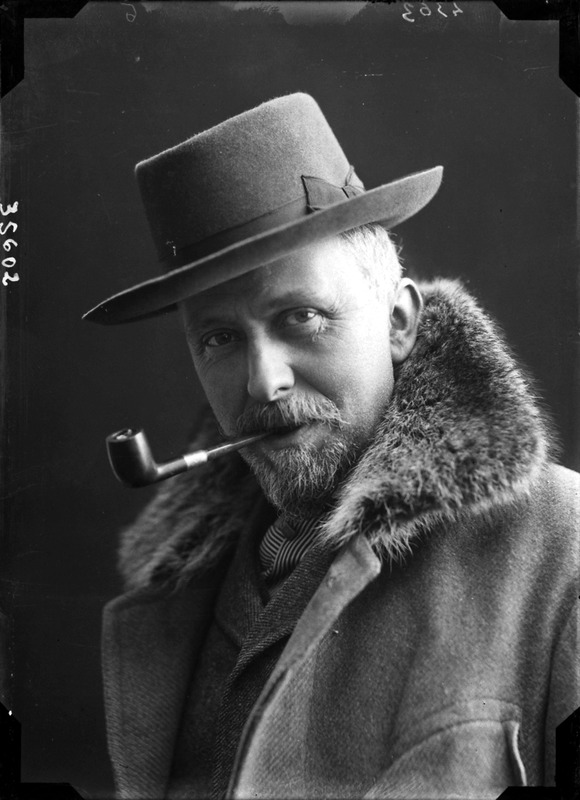
- Born: Luigi Bertelli; 19 March 1860; Florence, Italy
- Died: 27 November 1920 (aged 62); Florence, Italy
- Resting place: Cimitero delle Porte Sante
- Occupations: Writer; Journalist
- Known for: Il Giornalino di Gian Burrasca; Il giornalino della Domenica

Luigi Bertelli (19 March 1860 - 27 November 1920), best known as Vamba, was an Italian writer, illustrator and journalist.

== Biography ==
Born in Florence, having completed his studies Bertelli became a railway employer, working first in Rimini and later in Foggia. He later started collaborating with the Roman newspaper Capitan Fracassa and in 1884 he was officially employed as a journalist and caricaturist. He soon adopted the pseudonym "Vamba", named after the clown of Walter Scott's Ivanhoe. After collaborating with several newspapers, in 1890 he founded and directed L'O di Giotto, a newspaper close to the radical political positions of Felice Cavallotti, and in 1901 he co-founded the regional newspaper Il Bruscolo.

In 1893 Vamba was commissioned by a publisher to write a book for children. The result was a lasting favorite, Ciondolino (Shirt-Tail, 1896), illustrated by Carlo Chiostri, which is about a boy transformed into an ant; reminiscent of Fabre and Maeterlinck, scientific detail is provided without didacticism, and ant life is critically compared with human life.

Vamba's most famous book remains Il Giornalino di Gian Burrasca (The Diary of Gian Burrasca, 1912 ), the pedagogical and humorous story of a lively 9 year old. Like Pinocchio, it broke with the tradition of model characters offered for children's edification, but the outrageously naughty protagonist's adventures and the various registers of comic language ultimately serve to satirize adults.

Vamba's most notable achievement was the founding and editing, in Florence, of one of Italy's most distinguished children's newspapers, Il giornalino della Domenica (The Children's Sunday Paper, 1906–1927), which similarly avoided pedagogy; it holds a unique place in the history of Italian children's literature. From the outset, Vamba intended it to be of the highest quality and recruited many of the finest writers and illustrators of the time. Notable contributors included the great poet Pascoli, the novelists Luigi Capuana, Matilde Serao, and Grazia Deledda, the short story writer Renato Fucini, and, among leading specialists for children, Salgari, De Amicis, Ida Baccini, Padre Ermenegildo Pistelli, and Giuseppe Fanciulli, some of whom made their name through a regular column in the paper.

In the summer of 1920 he fell ill, dying on 27 November 1920. A funerary monument made by the sculptor Libero Andreotti was inaugurated in Florence on 14 January 1923. Vamba was inspired by the patriotic ideals of the Risorgimento and cultivated—partly through a Giornalino club—a sense of community and friendship among young readers throughout Italy.

== Bibliography ==
- Barsali, Mario (1967). "BERTELLI, Luigi". Dizionario Biografico degli Italiani (in Italian). Vol. 9: Berengario–Biagini. Rome: Istituto dell'Enciclopedia Italiana. ISBN 978-88-12-00032-6.
- Nissim Rossi, Lea (1954). Vamba: Luigi Bertelli. Florence: Le Monnier.
- Michieli, Armando (1965). Vamba. Brescia: La Scuola.
- Nissim Rossi, Lea (1967). Luigi Bertelli (Vamba). Milan: Mondadori Education. ISBN 8800863507.
- Ascenzi, Anna; Di Felice, Maila; Raffaele, Lea, eds. (2008). Santa giovinezza!: lettere di Luigi Bertelli e dei suoi corrispondenti, 1883-1920. Macerata: Alfabetica Edizioni. ISBN 8890250933.
- Anau, Roberta (1967). Gian Burrasca. Ragazzi di marzapane e cervello di crema. La cucina di Vamba. Turin: Il leone verde edizioni. ISBN 8865800046.
