= Il giornalino della Domenica =

Italian children's magazine (1906–1927)

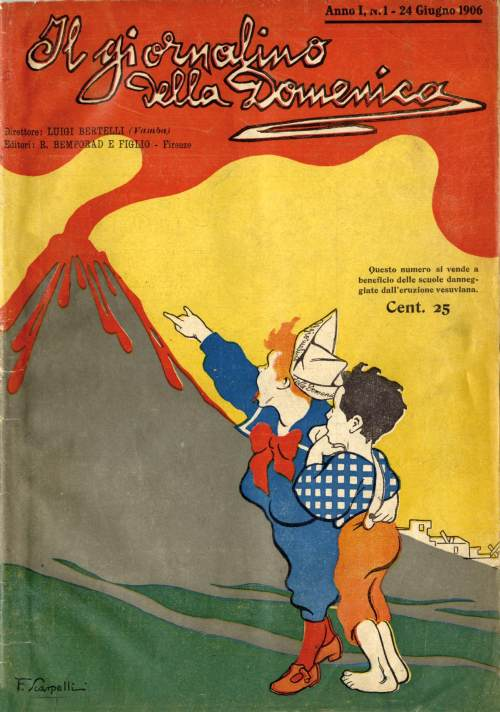
Cover of the first issue of the Giornalino, 24 June 1906, design: Filiberto Scarpèlli.

Il giornalino della Domenica was ‘the prototype of the modern periodical for children in Italy’. The magazine which was a high-quality publication was published between 1906 and 1927.

== History and profile ==
Founded in 1906 in Florence by ‘Vamba’, a pseudonym of the journalist Luigi Bertelli (1858–1920), Il giornalino della Domenica adopted an avant-garde style and a tone markedly patriotic and irredentist. Publication was initially weekly and its cover price of 25 centesimi made it distinctly more expensive than its rival the Corriere dei Piccoli which was launched two years later.

Il giornalino della Domenica targeted urban middle-class children. Its goal was not teach them to write or read, but to recognize their fantasies and desires through stories, poems and essays. Contributors included many of the most prominent Italian writers of the period as well as leading exponents of the graphic arts. Letters and other contributions from its young readers were also sought; those who responded included the daughters of Italo Svevo and Benito Mussolini.

The magazine ceased publication in 1927.

== See also ==
- List of magazines published in Italy
