= List of Italian films of 1946 =

A list of films produced in Italy (became a republic on 10 June) in 1946 (see 1946 in film):

== A-L ==
Title	Director	Cast	Genre	Notes
Abbasso la ricchezza!	Gennaro Righelli	Anna Magnani, Vittorio De Sica, Laura Gore	Comedy	
The Adulteress	Duilio Coletti	Clara Calamai, Roldano Lupi, Carlo Ninchi	Drama	
As Long as I Live	Jacques de Baroncelli	Edwige Feuillère, Jacques Berthier, Jean Debucourt	Drama	Co-production with France
The Bandit	Alberto Lattuada	Anna Magnani, Amedeo Nazzari, Carla Del Poggio	Italian neorealism	Nastro d'Argento for Best Actor (Nazzari).
Before Him All Rome Trembled	Carmine Gallone	Anna Magnani, Tito Gobbi, Hans Hinrich	Musical drama	
Biraghin	Carmine Gallone	Lilia Silvi, Andrea Checchi, Lauro Gazzolo	Comedy	
The Black Eagle	Riccardo Freda	Rossano Brazzi, Irasema Dilián, Gino Cervi	Historical adventure	
Departure at Seven	Mario Mattoli	Chiaretta Gelli, Carlo Campanini, Laura Gore	Musical	
Desire	Marcello Pagliero, Roberto Rossellini	Massimo Girotti, Elli Parvo, Carlo Ninchi	Drama	
The Devil's Gondola	Carlo Campogalliani	Loredana, Carlo Lombardi, Nino Pavese	Drama	
Eugenia Grandet	Mario Soldati	Alida Valli, Giorgio De Lullo	Drama	
Farewell, My Beautiful Naples	Mario Bonnard	Fosco Giachetti, Vera Carmi, Clelia Matania	Comedy	
Hotel Luna, Room 34	Carlo Ludovico Bragaglia	Chiaretta Gelli, Carlo Campanini	Crime	
I Met You in Naples	Pietro Francisci	Peppino De Filippo, Claudio Gora, Paolo Stoppa	Romance	
Le miserie di Monsú Travet	Mario Soldati	Carlo Campanini, Vera Carmi, Paola Veneroni, Gino Cervi	Comedy	Won 2 Nastro d'Argento
Lucia di Lammermoor	Piero Ballerini	Nelly Corradi, Afro Poli	Opera	Lucia di Lammermoor

== M-Z ==
Title	Director	Cast	Genre	Notes
Paisà	Roberto Rossellini	Maria Michi, Carmela Sazio, Robert Van Loon, Dots Johnson	Italian neorealism	Six episodes about World War II in Italy; Academy Award nominee for Best Script, New York Film Critics Circle Awards, National Board of Review
Rome, Free City	Marcello Pagliero	Andrea Checchi, Valentina Cortese, Nando Bruno, Vittorio De Sica	Drama	Close to the cinema of René Clair; Nastro d'Argento Best Script
Shoeshine (Sciuscià)	Vittorio De Sica	Franco Interlenghi, Rinaldo Smordoni, Annielo Mele, Bruno Ortenzi, Emilio Cigoli	Italian neorealism	Best Foreign Language Film Academy Award winners
The Sun Still Rises	Aldo Vergano	Elli Parvo, Massimo Serato, Carlo Lizzani, Gillo Pontecorvo	War drama	Italian neorealism. Won 2 Nastro d'Argento
The Testimony	Pietro Germi	Roldano Lupi, Marina Berti, Sandro Ruffini	Crime	
This Wine of Love (L'Elisir d'amore)	Mario Costa	Nelly Corradi, Gina Lollobrigida	Opera	
The Tyrant of Padua	Max Neufeld	Clara Calamai, Carlo Lombardi, Elsa De Giorgi	Historical	Adaptation of Victor Hugo's 1835 play
Un giorno nella vita	Alessandro Blasetti	Enzo Biliotti, Elisa Cegani	War	Entered into the 1946 Cannes Film Festival
A Yank in Rome	Luigi Zampa	Valentina Cortese, Andrea Checchi, Paolo Stoppa	Comedy	
