= William Kramer =

William Kramer may refer to:

- William M. Kramer (1920–2004), American rabbi, university professor and art collector
- William Kramer (runner) (1884–1964), American long-distance runner.
- William Kramer (aviator), pilot involved in the Aeroméxico Flight 498 crash

== See also ==
- Bill Kramer (born 1965), American attorney, businessman and member of the Wisconsin State Assembly
