= Baffico =

Baffico is a surname. Notable people with the surname include:

- James A. Baffico (born 1942), American television soap opera director, producer, and script writer
- Mario Baffico (1907–1972), Italian screenwriter and film director
