= Ettore Manni =

Italian actor (1927–1979)

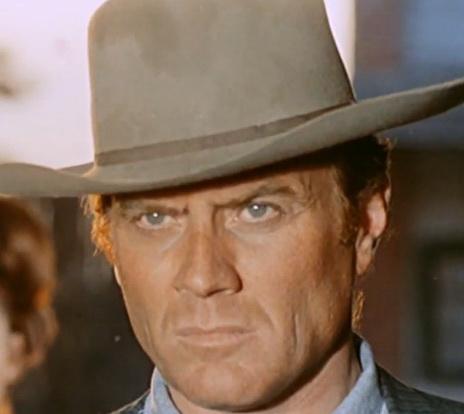
- Manni in Johnny Oro (1967)
- Born: 6 May 1927; Rome, Italy
- Died: 27 July 1979 (aged 52); Rome, Italy
- Occupation: Actor
- Years active: 1942–1979
- Spouse: Mireille Granelli
- Partner: Krista Nell (ended 1975)

Ettore Manni (6 May 1927 – 27 July 1979) was an Italian actor, active in film and television from 1952 and 1979. He was a popular leading man during the 1950’s and ‘60s, when he was a star of the peplum genre. In the following decade, he primarily played supporting roles, with his last appearance in Federico Fellini's City of Women (1980).

== Life and career ==
Manni was born and raised in Rome. While still a university student, he was spotted by director Luigi Comencini, who cast him in the lead role of his crime drama Girls Marked Danger (1952), despite his complete lack of acting experience. Following the success of the film, Manni turned to acting full-time, appearing in a significant number of films of any genre, becoming in a short time one of the most popular leading men in the Italian cinema. During the following two decades, Manni became a star of the peplum genre.

His fame declined somewhat in the 1960's, though he maintained a healthy career in supporting roles. He appeared mainly in Spaghetti Westerns and poliziotteschi, though he also took part in several international productions, including films by Delmer Daves (The Battle of the Villa Fiorita, 1965) and Tony Richardson (Mademoiselle, 1966).

Trading on his reputation as a rugged, masculine screen hero, Manni was cast in a co-starring role by Federico Fellini as Dr. Xavier Katzone in his surreal 1980 "battle-of-the-sexes" comedy City of Women. It would be his last film role, as he died shortly after completing his scenes.

== Personal life ==
Manni was married to actress Mireille Granelli, whom he met during the filming of Hercules, Prisoner of Evil. The two had a daughter together, named Alessia.

After their divorce, Manni entered a long-term relationship with Krista Nell, until her death from leukemia in 1975.

=== Death ===
Following Nell's death, Manni entered a period of severe depression. He died on 27 July 1979, aged 52, at his home in Rome from blood loss caused by a self-inflicted gunshot wound to his thigh. It is unknown if the injury was accidental or self-inflicted.

== Filmography ==
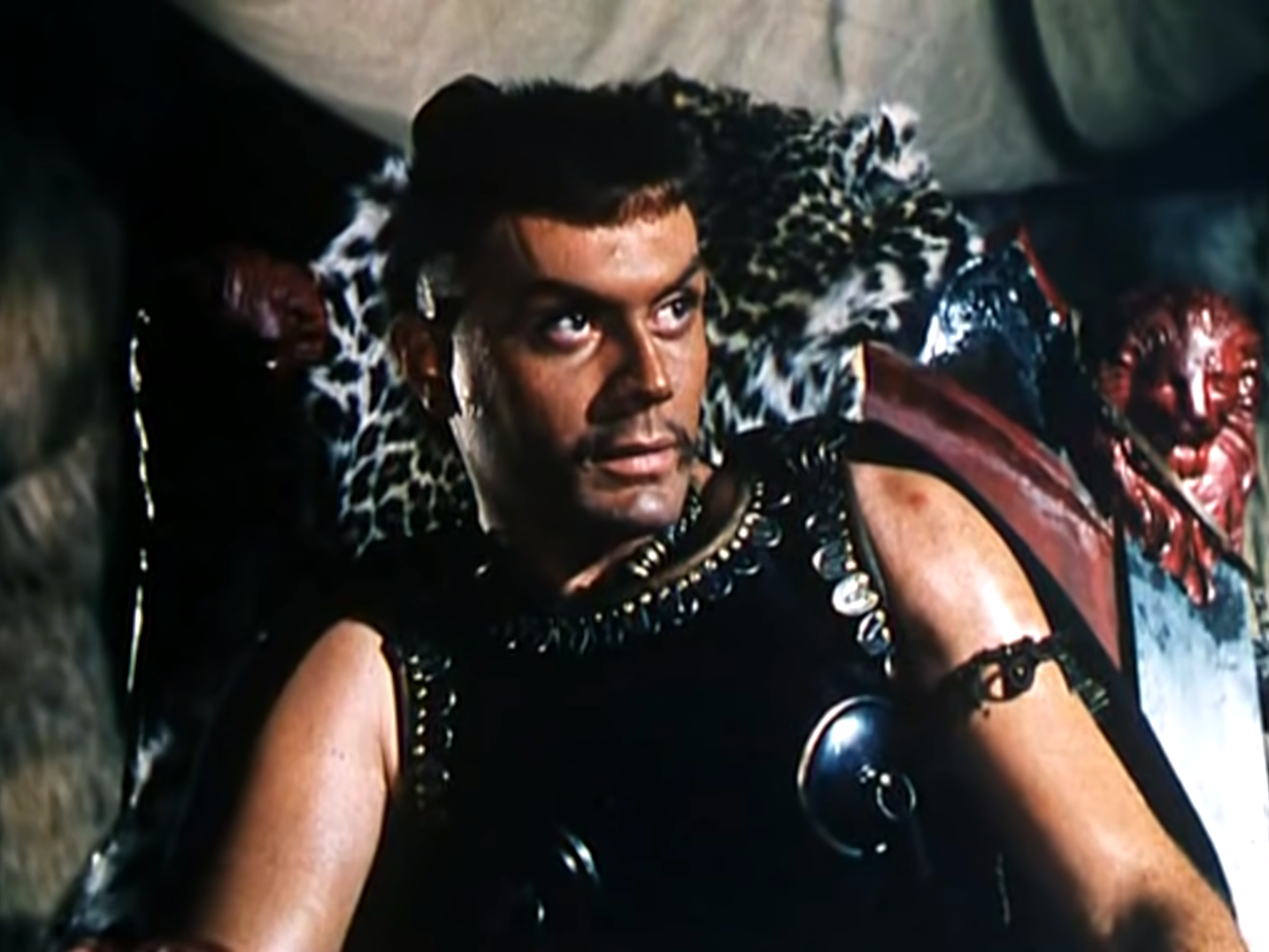
Manni portraying Bleda in Attila

- Girls Marked Danger (1952) - Carlo Sozzosi
- The Three Pirates (1952) - Il Corsaro Nero - Enrico di Ventimiglia
- Brothers of Italy (1952) - Il capitano Nazario Sauro
- Fatal Desire (1953) - Turiddu
- La lupa (1953) - Nanni Lasca
- The Ship of Condemned Women (1953) - Da Silva
- Two Nights with Cleopatra (1954) - Marcantonio
- Attila (1954) - Bleda, brother of Attila
- Human Torpedoes (1954) - Marco
- Bella non piangere (1955) - Enrico Toti
- Le Amiche (1955) - Carlo
- Tua per la vita (1955) - Marco Vetti
- Folgore Division (1955) - Captain Martini
- Yalis, la vergine del Roncador (1955) - Glauco
- A Woman Alone (1956) - Giulio, il giornalista
- Poor, But Handsome (1957) - Ugo
- Dimentica il mio passato (1957) - Juan
- Addio sogni di gloria (1957) - Marcello Roveda
- Il ricatto di un padre (1957) - Ingegner Paolo Mari
- Susanna Whipped Cream (1957) - (uncredited)
- Marisa la civetta (1957) - Luigi
- Addio per sempre (1958) - Salvatore Improta
- Ladro lui, ladra lei (1958) - Raimondi
- Giovane canaglia (1958) - Marco
- The Warrior and the Slave Girl (1958) - Marco Numidio
- Pirate of the Black Hawk (1958) - Giovanni
- Addio per sempre! (1958) - Salvatore Improta
- Ten Ready Rifles (1959) - Miguel
- Buen viaje, Pablo (1959) - Pablo
- Legions of the Nile (1959) - Curridio
- Austerlitz (1960) - Lucien Bonaparte
- Cleopatra's Daughter (1960) - Resi - Pharaoh's Physician
- The Revolt of the Slaves (1960) - San Sebastiano
- Behind Closed Doors (1961) - Il marinaio
- Amazons of Rome (1961) - Horatio / Cocles, Roman Consul
- Hercules and the Conquest of Atlantis (1961) - Androclo, King of Thebes
- Ursus and the Tartar Princess (1961) - Prince Stefan
- The Valiant (1962) - Luigi Durand de la Penne
- Samson Against the Sheik (1962)
- Lo sceicco rosso (1962) - Mohammad
- Attack of the Normans (1962) - Olivier D'Anglon
- Quattro notti con Alba (1962) - Sergeant Morettini
- The Shortest Day (1963) - Ettore (uncredited)
- Gold for the Caesars (1963) - Luna the Celt
- La pupa (1963) - Gianni
- Hercules and the Masked Rider (1963) - Captain Blasco
- Rome Against Rome (1964) - Gaius
- Mission to Venice (1964) - Giuseppe
- Hercules, Prisoner of Evil (1964) - Ilo
- Giants of Rome (1964) - Castor
- The Battle of the Villa Fiorita (1965) - Father Rossi
- Mademoiselle (1966) - Manou
- Johnny Oro (1966) - Sheriff Bill Norton
- Starblack (1966)
- The Devil in Love (1966) - Capitano Gianfigliazzo - The Guard Captain
- For a Few Extra Dollars (1966)
- Sept hommes et une garce (1967) - Le capitaine autrichien
- The Strange Night (1967) - I'ufficiale
- The Stranger Returns (1967) - Lt. George Stafford
- Untamable Angelique (1967) - Jason
- Straniero... fatti il segno della croce! (1968) - Blake Logan
- Angelique and the Sultan (1968) - Jason
- All'ultimo sangue (1968) - El Chaleco
- Bury Them Deep (1968) - Jonathan Clay
- The Battle of El Alamein (1969) - Italian Captain
- Sartana the Gravedigger (1969) - Baxter Red
- Les belles au bois dormantes (1970) - Le docteur Henri Delmas
- La salamandra del deserto (1970)
- Django and Sartana Are Coming... It's the End (1970) - Sheriff
- Dead Men Don't Make Shadows (1970) - Barrett, former Billy Ring
- Bali (1970) - Police Commissioner
- Mazzabubù... quante corna stanno quaggiù? (1971) - Il medico fecondatore
- That's How We Women Are (1971) - Teresa's Husband (segment "Schiava d'amore")
- Karzan, il favoloso uomo della jungla (1972) - Captain Fox
- A.A.A. Massaggiatrice bella presenza offresi... (1972) - Police Commissioner
- Amico mio, frega tu... che frego io! (1973) - Jonas Dickinson
- Super Bitch (1973) - Morell
- Tony Arzenta (1973) - Gesmundo - the sauna owner
- Li chiamavano i tre moschettieri... invece erano quattro (1973) - Porthos
- Chino (1973) - Sheriff
- Anna, quel particolare piacere (1973) - Zuco
- Buona parte di Paolina (1973) - Il brigante
- Young Lucrezia (1974) - Rodrigo Borgia - Papa Alessandro VI
- Drama of the Rich (1974) - Il dottore Carlo Secchi
- Heroes in Hell (1974) - Bakara
- Rabid Dogs (1974) - Bank President
- Furia nera (1975) - David Chandler
- Calling All Police Cars (1975) - Enrico Tummoli
- The Divine Nymph (1975) - Il professore Marco Pisani
- Eye of the Cat (1975) - Un amico di cesare
- The Sinner (1975) - Santuzzo
- La madama (1976) - Sante Tonnaro
- Street People (1976) - Il padre Frank
- Crimebusters (1976) - Lawyer Vieri
- Meet Him and Die (1976) - Perrone
- Oh, Serafina! (1976) - Padre di Serafina
- The Rip-off (1977) - Ettore
- La malavita attacca... la polizia risponde! (1977) - Rampelli
- In the Name of the Pope King (1977) - Il conte Ottavio
- Silver Saddle (1978) - Thomas Barrett
- Il commissario di ferro (1978) - Ingravallo
- A Man on His Knees (1979) - Vincenzo Fabbricante
- Hypochondriac (1979) - Amministratore dei poderi
- La verdad sobre el caso Savolta (1980) - Claudedeu
- City of Women (1980) - Dr. Xavier Katzone
