= Hotel Luna, Room 34 =

- Film poster
- Directed by: Carlo Ludovico Bragaglia
- Written by: Aldo De Benedetti
- Produced by: Carlo Ponti
- Starring: Chiaretta Gelli; Carlo Campanini; Andrea Checchi
- Cinematography: Carlo Montuori
- Edited by: Anna Del Pozzo
- Music by: Nino Rota
- Production company: Lux Film
- Distributed by: Lux Film
- Release date: 1946
- Running time: 85 minutes
- Country: Italy
- Language: Italian

Hotel Luna, Room 34 (Italian: Albergo Luna, camera 34) is a 1946 Italian crime-thriller-melodrama film directed by Carlo Ludovico Bragaglia and starring Chiaretta Gelli, Carlo Campanini and Andrea Checchi.

It was produced by Lux Film, and earned 39 million lira at the box office.

== Cast ==
- Chiaretta Gelli as Bianca Morelli
- Carlo Campanini as Paolo Gualtieri
- Andrea Checchi as Andrea Esposito
- Roberto Villa as Enrico Landi
- Arturo Bragaglia as Lorenzetti - the double bass player
- Marcello Giorda as Martini - the impresario
- Giovanni Petrucci
- Giovanni Dolfini
- Antonio Bracci
- Guido Lauri

== Bibliography ==
- Chiti, Roberto & Poppi, Roberto. Dizionario del cinema italiano: Dal 1945 al 1959. Gremese Editore, 1991.
- Hischak, Thomas S. . The Encyclopedia of Film Composers. Rowman & Littlefield, 2015.
