= Kerima =

Kerima can refer to

- Kerima Polotan Tuvera (1925–2011), Filipino writer and journalist
- Kerima (actress) (1925–2014), French actress
