= Il birichino di papà =

- Directed by: Raffaello Matarazzo
- Written by: Raffaello Matarazzo; Alessandro De Stefani; Cesare Zavattini
- Story by: Henny Koch
- Cinematography: Clemente Santoni
- Edited by: Mario Serandrei
- Music by: Nino Rota
- Production company: Lux Film
- Release date: 1942
- Country: Italy
- Language: Italian

Il birichino di papà ("Dad's little rascal") is a 1942 Italian "white-telephones" comedy film written and directed by Raffaello Matarazzo. It is an adaptation of the 1905 novel Papas Junge by Henny Koch.

== Cast ==
- Armando Falconi as Leopoldo Giovannini
- Chiaretta Gelli as Nicoletta
- Amelia Chellini as Elisa Giovannini
- Dina Galli as Marquise Della Bella
- Anna Vivaldi as Livia Giovannini
- Franco Scandurra as Roberto Della Bella
- Nicoletta Parodi as Irene Della Bella
- Paola Borboni as The College Director
- Carlo Campanini as Lawyer De Marchi
- Enrico Luzi as Gegè
- Renato Chiantoni as Man at the phone with Nicoletta
