= Life Begins Anew =

1945 film

- Film poster
- Directed by: Mario Mattoli
- Written by: Aldo De Benedetti; Mario Mattoli
- Produced by: Baldassarre Negroni
- Starring: Alida Valli; Fosco Giachetti; Eduardo De Filippo; Carlo Romano
- Cinematography: Ubaldo Arata
- Edited by: Fernando Tropea
- Music by: Ezio Carabella
- Production company: Excelsa Film
- Distributed by: Minerva Film
- Release date: 21 September 1945
- Running time: 84 minutes
- Country: Italy
- Language: Italian

Life Begins Anew (Italian: La vita ricomincia) is a 1945 Italian melodrama film directed by Mario Mattoli and starring Alida Valli, Fosco Giachetti and Eduardo De Filippo. It was the third most popular Italian film during 1945-46 after Roberto Rossellini's Rome, Open City and Partenza ore 7, a comedy also directed by Mattoli.

== Plot ==
Paolo Martini, a doctor of chemistry and Italian veteran returns home to Rome after spending some time in a British Prisoner of War camp during the Second World War. After returning to find his son, Sandro, grown some years. He finds his wife, Patrizia, had some difficulty during his 6 years away. He also meets the Professor, their new next-door neighbor who lost his wife and daughter in the bombings of Napoli.

After readjusting to his new life at home, Paolo is frightened when Patrizia suddenly disappears. After searching through Rome with the Professor, he finally finds her in custody at the police station. She has been accused of murdering a man.

Patrizia admits to Paolo that during the desperate war years, she prostituted herself to pay for medicine to keep Sandro alive. Paolo is at first outraged and pushes her away. He even tried to confess to the murder to spare Patrizia, despite the advice of the investigator not to. Patrizia is eventually acquitted of the murder, but Paolo admits to wanting to leave her. The Professor's speech to Paolo at the end of the film convinces Paolo to stay and try to restart his life anew with Sandro and Patrizia.

== Cast ==
- Alida Valli as Patrizia Martini
- Fosco Giachetti as Paolo Martini
- Eduardo De Filippo as Il professore
- Carlo Romano as Croci
- Aldo Silvani as Il giudice istruttore
- Nando Bruno as Scorcelletti, il camionista
- Anna Haardt as La baroness Magda Huberth
- Maria Donati as Maria
- Ughetto Bertucci as Righetto
- Maurizio Ceselli as Sandrino Martini, figlio di Patrizia e Paolo

== Production ==
The film was shot on location in war-damaged Naples. This was not because the director Mattoli wished to follow neorealist style, which he largely rejected. Interior scenes were shot at the Palatino Studios in Rome. The film was important in Giachetti's transition from one of the leading stars of the Fascist era into a figure acceptable to post-war audiences. This was partly achieved through retaining his previously strongly masculine persona which was adapted to the new conditions. Alida Valli, also a celebrated Fascist period star, received a boost from the film and went to Hollywood the following year.
