= The Dream of Zorro =

1952 film

- Directed by: Mario Soldati
- Written by: Mario Amendola; Ruggero Maccari; Marcello Marchesi; Sandro Continenza
- Produced by: Niccolò Theodoli
- Starring: Walter Chiari; Delia Scala; Vittorio Gassman
- Cinematography: Carlo Montuori; Mario Montuori
- Edited by: Renato Cinquini
- Music by: Mario Nascimbene
- Production company: Industrie Cinematografiche Sociali
- Distributed by: Titanus Distribuzione
- Release date: 26 March 1952
- Running time: 93 minutes
- Country: Italy
- Language: Italian

The Dream of Zorro (Italian: Il Sogno di Zorro) is a 1952 Italian comedy adventure film directed by Mario Soldati and starring Walter Chiari, Delia Scala and Vittorio Gassman. The future star Sophia Loren had a minor role in the film.

The film's sets were designed by Guido Fiorini.

== Plot ==
A direct descendant of the legendary Zorro, an elderly gentleman has an only son named Raimondo (Walter Chiari), in whom there is no trace of the original pride of his ancestors. Raimondo is a shy and fearful young man, who has become this way since he was a child, following a terrible fall, in which he hit his head. When the father invites a friend with his daughter to his farm, whom he intends to marry Raimondo, the latter has such a childish and foolish demeanor that everything is upset. Chased out of the house he decides to enter the convent, but on the way he meets a powerful gentleman who conspires against the Governor and, involved in the melee between them and his opponents, Raimondo is hit in the head. Raimondo immediately recovers the daring ancient spirits: he transforms himself into a skilled swordsman - as well as an ardent seducer - and, by throwing himself against the lord's opponents, he routs them and defeats them. Full of gratitude, the gentleman, who is a duke and was wounded, entrusts him with a mission of all trust. Raimondo should go to the palace of a powerful opponent of the duke, whose daughter Estrella (Delia Scala) must marry and pretend to be the duke himself. Raimondo carries out the task, to the point of falling in love with the girl and passing victorious through the limitless traps set by his opponents. Meanwhile, Estrella is kidnapped and, after ups and downs, Raimondo recaptures the girl. With her intervention, the young man makes the duke's cause triumph, who, finally appointed governor, renounces her to Estrella, granting her in marriage to the heroic Raimondo. "Zorro's dream" is finally crowned.

== Cast ==
- Walter Chiari as Don Raimundo Esteban
- Delia Scala as Gloria / Estrella / Dolores
- Vittorio Gassman as Don Antonio / Juan
- Carlo Ninchi as Don Esteban Contrero
- Umberto Aquilino as José
- Anna Arena as La Locandiera
- Sandro Bianchi as Pablo / Ramon
- Pietro Capanna as Manuel
- Giorgio Costantini as Capitano
- Juan de Landa as César / Pedro
- Augusto Di Giovanni as Don Formoso
- Giovanni Dolfini as Don Alonzo
- Claudio Ermelli as Maestro di Musica
- Giacomo Furia as Panchito
- Sophia Loren as Conchita (as Sofia Scicolone)
- Michele Malaspina as Perez
- Gisella Monaldi as Luisa / Consuelo
- Guido Morisi as Ignazio
- Luigi Pavese as Don Garcia Fernandez
- Michèle Philippe as Maria / Marta
- Riccardo Rioli as Notaio
- Gualtiero Tumiati as Don Cesar Alcazan
- Nietta Zocchi as Dona Hermosa Alcazan
