= La lupa (1953 film) =

1953 film by Alberto Lattuada

- Directed by: Alberto Lattuada
- Written by: Ennio De Concini; Alberto Lattuada; Alberto Moravia; Ivo Perilli
- Produced by: Dino De Laurentiis; Carlo Ponti
- Cinematography: Aldo Tonti
- Edited by: Leo Catozzo
- Music by: Felice Lattuada
- Production company: Ponti-De Laurentiis Cinematografica
- Distributed by: Paramount Films
- Release date: 25 September 1953
- Country: Italy
- Language: Italian

La lupa (also known as She-Wolf, The Vixen and The Devil Is a Woman) is a 1953 Italian drama film directed by Alberto Lattuada.

It is based on the novella with the same name by Giovanni Verga.

== Synopsis ==
In a remote village in southern Italy, La Lupa ("The She-Wolf"), a beautiful and lascivious woman, fascinates and attracts men, young and old, who can't resist her. However, she develops an obsession with Nanni, a farm hand who grows olive trees and wants to marry her teenage daughter, Maricchia. At her mother's urging, Maricchia marries Nanni. But "the She-Wolf" still lurks around the latter, to Maricchia's despair. Unable to resist and overwhelmed, Nanni resolves to kill his mother-in-law.

== Adaptation ==
It should also be noted that Giovanni Verga later made a theatrical adaptation (1896) - one of the plays was directed by Franco Zeffirelli with Anna Magnani and Lucia Bosé in 1965 - and then a libretto. For a musical melodrama, in collaboration with De Robertis, composed by Giacomo Puccini and then G.-A. Tasca and represented in 1933.

== Cast ==
- Kerima: The 'She-Wolf'
- Ettore Manni: Nanni Lasca
- May Britt: Maria Maricchia
- Ignazio Balsamo: Don Antonio Malerba
- Mario Passante: Imbornone
- Giovanna Ralli: Agnese
- Salvo Libassi: Raffaele
- Anna Arena: Giovanna Vasilio
- Maurizio Arena
