= Vasco Creti =

Italian actor (1874–1945)

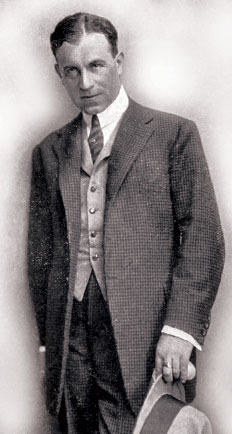
- Creti in 1920
- Born: 7 December 1874; Florence, Italy
- Died: 16 October 1945 (aged 70); Rome, Italy
- Occupation: Actor
- Years active: 1894–1944
- Spouse: Valeria Creti

Vasco Creti (7 December 1874 – 16 October 1945) was an Italian stage and film actor. He appeared in more than 110 films between 1915 and 1944. He was married to actress Valeria Creti.

== Selected filmography ==
- Maschiaccio (1917)
- Il siluramento dell'Oceania (1917)
- The Two Sergeants (1922)
- The Flight of Socrates (1923)
- The Last Days of Pompeii (1926)
- Company and the Crazy (1928)
- Sun (1929)
- The Man with the Claw (1931)
- Mother Earth (1931)
- Before the Jury (1931)
- The Charmer (1931)
- Palio (1932)
- Zaganella and the Cavalier (1932)
- The Gift of the Morning (1932)
- Pergolesi (1932)
- The Haller Case (1933)
- The Table of the Poor (1932)
- Creatures of the Night (1934)
- Aldebaran (1935)
- The Joker King (1935)
- The Ambassador (1936)
- God's Will Be Done (1936)
- La Damigella di Bard (1936)
- Pietro Micca (1938)
- The House of Shame (1938)
- The Widow (1939)
- Two Million for a Smile (1939)
- Guest for One Night (1939)
- The Faceless Voice (1939)
- A Thousand Lire a Month (1939)
- Who Are You? (1939)
- The Silent Partner (1939)
- It Always Ends That Way (1939)
- The Castle Ball (1939)
- No Man's Land (1939)
- Wealth Without a Future (1939)
- The Cavalier from Kruja (1940)
- The Sin of Rogelia Sanchez (1940)
- A Husband for the Month of April (1941)
- Blood Wedding (1941)
- Non ti pago! (1942)
- The Woman of Sin (1942)
- Music on the Run (1943)
