= May Britt =

Swedish actress (1934–2025)

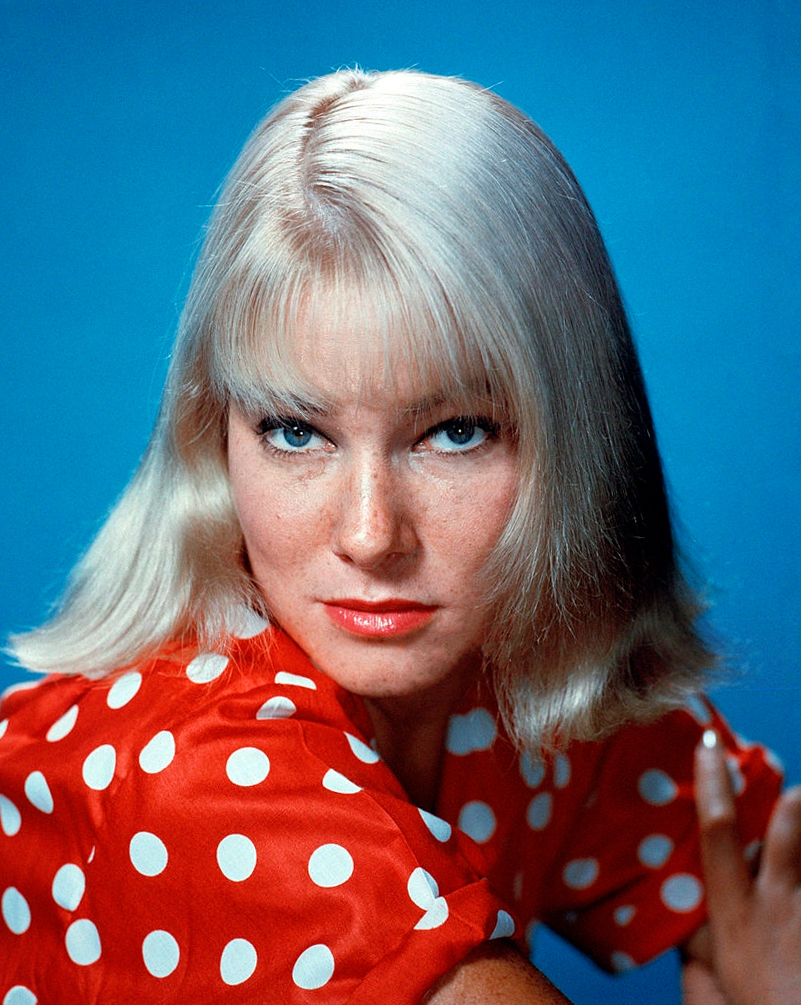
- Britt in the 1960s
- Born: Maj-Britt Wilkens; 22 March 1934; Lidingö, Sweden
- Died: 11 December 2025 (aged 91); Los Angeles, California, U.S.
- Occupation: Actress
- Years active: 1952–1988
- Spouses: Edwin Gregson (m. 1958; div. 1959) Sammy Davis Jr. (m. 1960; div. 1968) Lennart Ringquist (m. 1993; died 2017)
- Children: 3

Maj-Britt Wilkens (22 March 1934 – 11 December 2025), known as May Britt (/maɪ/ MY), was a Swedish–American actress who had a brief career in the 1950s in Italy and later in the United States. She was married to American entertainer Sammy Davis Jr. from 1960 to 1968.

== Life and career ==
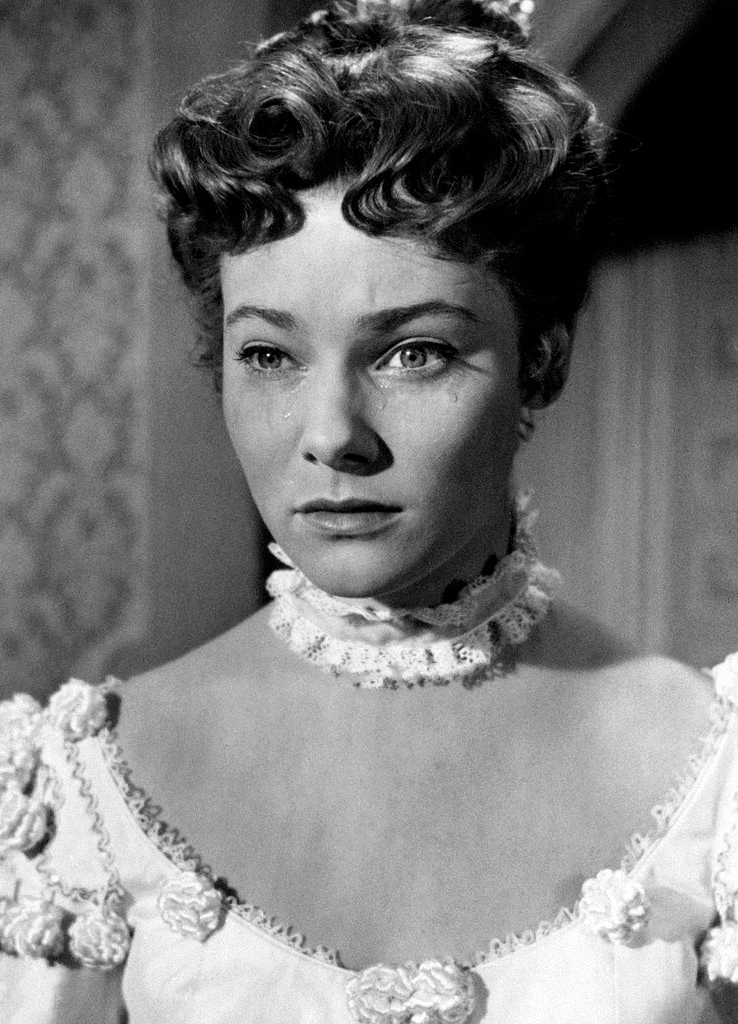
Britt in Cavalleria rusticana

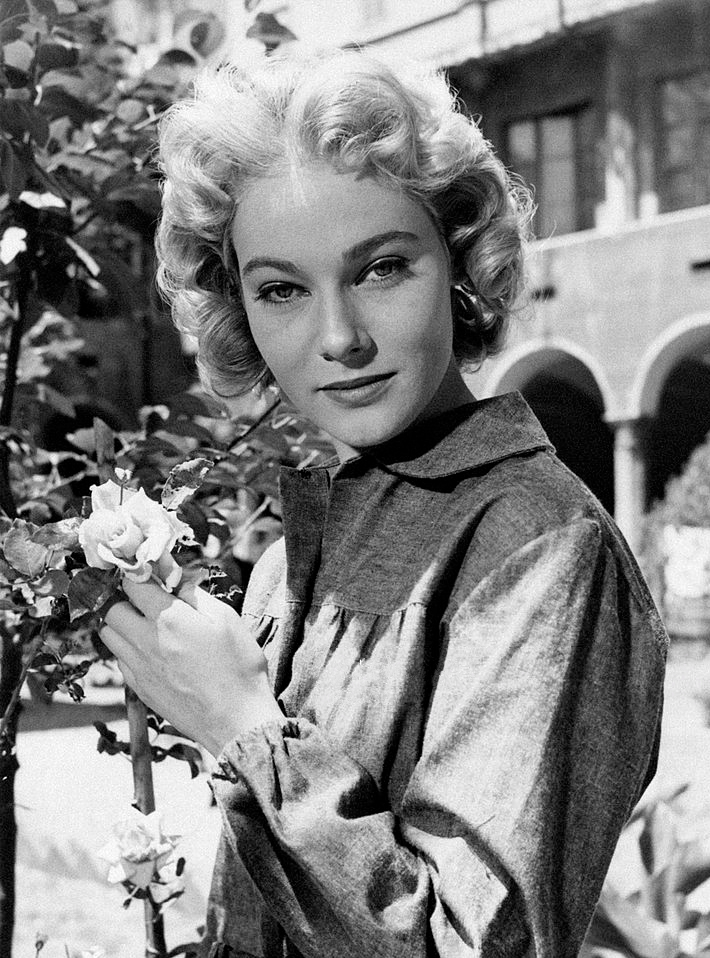
Britt in L'ultimo amante

Maj-Britt Wilkens was born in Lidingö on 22 March 1934, the daughter of Hugo and Hillevi Wilkens.

Britt was discovered as a teenager by Italian filmmakers Carlo Ponti and Mario Soldati in 1951. She was then an assistant to a Stockholm photographer. The two filmmakers were in Sweden to cast a young blonde for the title role in Jolanda, the Daughter of the Black Corsair. They came to the studio where she worked to view photographs of models. After meeting her, they offered her the part. May Britt, as she was renamed professionally, moved to Rome. As expected, she made her film debut as the leading actress in Jolanda, the Daughter of the Black Corsair (1952).

In the following years, she worked in some ten Cinecittà productions. She also featured in the epic film War and Peace of 1956.

In the late 1950s, Britt relocated to Hollywood after signing with 20th Century Fox. She starred in a few movies, including The Young Lions (1958) with Marlon Brando and Montgomery Clift, The Hunters (1958) with Robert Mitchum and Robert Wagner and Murder, Inc. (1960) with Peter Falk, as well as a much-criticised remake of The Blue Angel (1959) in the role first created by Marlene Dietrich in 1930.

=== Marriages ===
Britt married Edwin Gregson, a college student, in 1958. In 1959, she filed for divorce.

She met Sammy Davis Jr. in 1959. They began dating, and, after a brief engagement, were married on 13 November 1960. Their wedding caused controversy. A rumour or myth was that John F. Kennedy and Robert F. Kennedy told Frank Sinatra to tell Davis not to marry May until after the 1960 Presidential Election. At that time interracial marriage was forbidden by law in 31 U.S. states, and only in 1967 were those laws (by then down to 17 states) ruled unconstitutional by the U.S. Supreme Court. Prior to the wedding, Britt converted to Judaism. The couple were married by Reform Rabbi William M. Kramer. It has been confirmed by Sammy and Britt's daughter Tracey, Nancy Sinatra, and documentarian Sam Pollard that this marriage resulted in Kennedy rejecting an invitation for Davis to perform at his Inauguration. Yet, Harry Belafonte, who was married to a white woman at the time, was invited to perform.

Once married, Britt retired from films.

Britt and Davis had a daughter, Tracey Davis (July 5, 1961 – November 2, 2020).

Britt and Davis adopted two sons. Britt and Davis divorced in 1968 after Davis had an affair with dancer Lola Falana.

=== Later life and death ===
After the divorce, Britt resumed working and made sporadic television guest appearances, the last an episode of Probe in 1988. She and Davis remained on good terms. In 1993 she married Lennart Rindquist, to whom she remained married until his death in 2017.

Britt died at Providence Tarzana Medical Center in Tarzana, California, on 11 December 2025, at the age of 91.

== In popular culture ==
May Britt was portrayed by Megan Dodds in the 1998 television film The Rat Pack which depicted her marriage to Sammy Davis Jr., who was played by Don Cheadle.

== Selected filmography ==
Film
Year	Title	Role	Notes
1953	The Unfaithfuls	Liliana Capacci Rodgers	
1953	Jolanda, the Daughter of the Black Corsair	Jolanda	Alternative title: Jolanda la figlia del corsaro nero
1953	Fatal Desire	Santuzza	Alternative title: Cavalleria rusticana
1953	La lupa	Maria Maricchia	
1953	Funniest Show on Earth	Brigitte, la domatrice	
1953	The Ship of Condemned Women	Consuelo	
1954	Vergine moderna	Claudia Bardi	Alternative title: Modern Virgin
1955	Give 'em Hell	Gina	
1955	L'ultimo amante	Maria Spanisch	
1955	Revelation	Nadia Ulianova	
1956	War and Peace	Sonya Rostova	
1958	The Young Lions	Gretchen Hardenberg	
1958	The Hunters	Kristina Abbott	
1959	The Blue Angel	Lola-Lola	
1960	Murder, Inc.	Eadie Collins	
1976	Haunts	Ingrid	Alternative title: The Veil

Television
Year	Title	Role	Notes
1968	The Danny Thomas Hour	Anna	1 episode
1969	Mission: Impossible	Eva Gollan	1 episode
1971	The Most Deadly Game	Lili	1 episode
1971	The Partners		1 episode
1988	Probe	Helga	1 episode
