= Tourist Train =

1933 film

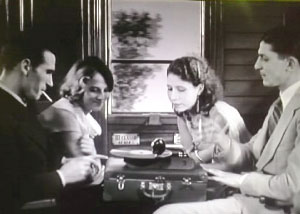
- Film scene
- Directed by: Raffaello Matarazzo
- Written by: Gino Mazzucchi; Raffaello Matarazzo; Gastone Bossio
- Produced by: Gastone Bossio
- Starring: Maurizio D'Ancora; Anna Ariani; Ugo Gracci
- Cinematography: Anchise Brizzi
- Edited by: Marcello Caccialupi
- Music by: Nino Rota
- Production company: Amato Film
- Distributed by: Artisti Associati
- Release date: 1934
- Running time: 63 minutes
- Country: Italy
- Language: Italian

Tourist Train (Italian: Treno popolare) is a 1933 Italian comedy film directed by Raffaello Matarazzo and starring Marcello Spada, Lina Gennari and Carlo Petrangeli. The film portrays the comic adventures of a group of summertime travellers. It was shot on the Florence-Rome railway and in Orvieto. It was one of a number of films made during the 1930s whose realism pointed in the direction of the later development of Italian neorealism.

== Cast ==
- Marcello Spada as Carlo
- Lina Gennari as Lina
- Carlo Petrangeli as Giovanni
- Cesare Zoppetti as un viaggiatore
- Maria Denis as Maria
- Jone Frigerio as viaggiatrice
- Raffaello Matarazzo as direttore di banda
- Giuseppe Pierozzi as Il viaggiatore abusivo
- Gino Viotti as Il signore anziano con papillon
- Umberto Sacripante as Un viaggiatore
- Aldo Frosi as Un viaggiatore
- Giuseppe Ricagno as Un viaggiatore

== Bibliography ==
- Brunetta, Gian Piero. The History of Italian Cinema: A Guide to Italian Film from Its Origins to the Twenty-first Century. Princeton University Press, 2009.
