= Briscola (film) =

1951 film

- Directed by: Aldo Rossi
- Written by: Aldo Rossi
- Produced by: Aldo Rossi
- Starring: Carlo Campanini; Annamaria Talamo; Giorgi Corradini
- Cinematography: Ugo Bianchi
- Edited by: Aldo Rossi
- Music by: Ettore Diglio
- Production company: Rossi Film
- Release date: 14 March 1951
- Country: Italy
- Language: Italian

Briscola or Rich and Poor (Italian: Ricchi e poveri is a 1951 Italian drama film directed by Aldo Rossi and starring Carlo Campanini, Annamaria Talamo and Giorgi Corradini. It takes its name from the Italian card game Briscola. Several Italian footballers appear as themselves in the film.

== Plot ==
At the Luigi Ferraris Stadium in Genoa several kids, among which Briscola and Pertica stand out, are quite good at playing football, but their conditions are very critical, balls made of rags, broken or missing shoes, clothes worn to the extreme. However, they are carefree and play as best they can on the street or in the Bisagno river bed. Little Lillina, daughter of an industrialist and orphan of her mother, lives raised by a guardian and other dear servants of the house, among which the good butler Tonio stands out. From the top of the boundary wall of her villa she observes the poor boys and despite the fact that she receives mockery, she has extreme sympathy for all of them. One day these, challenged by a boy who attends the "Institute", that is the Liceo Ginnasio Andrea D'Oria, agree to play against a real team of students, but they are not in condition, without shoes the game ends in brawl. Lillina learns this and would like to help them. Unbeknownst to them, she tries to ask her father, through the butler, to make a donation, but instead she will be taxed by her servants. The butler will need to make contact. However he is embarrassed to enter into confidence, he is laughed at and chased away by the proud group.

To raise funds, our friends set up a stage from which they perform a play, but a thunderstorm puts the down-and-out audience on the run before they manage to collect offers. Later Tonio, after attending a Sampdoria match, sneaking into the locker room manages to convince Briscola that he has knowledge and familiarity with the players, who actually take him for mad. He will then be able to win the trust of the boys and will be able to donate a sum and accompany them to buy precious equipment, suits, socks, shoes, things never seen before! The team will now be able to register for the local championship, and from one match to another there is a final with the first challengers of the "Institute" which takes place in Cornigliano. It happens, however, that Briscola in an excess of her causes Lillina to fall, beating her head. Shortly before the start of the final, the desperate butler confesses to the boys that he is not a sportsman and that he is serious because of Briscola Lillina. The boys panic, the game begins, but despondency prevails. In the second half the news arrives that Lillina is out of danger, indeed she even demands a telephone commentary of the match. So victory and happy ending at Lillina's bedside with her father who will become team president.

== Cast ==
- Carlo Campanini as Il maggiordomo
- Annamaria Talamo as Lillina
- Giorgi Corradini
- Enrico Ardizzone
- Guglielmo Barnabò
- Elio Crovetto
- Iva Yvette
- Gino Scaraglia
- Giovanni Ballico as (Himself)
- Pietro Bonetti as Himself
- Dino Burlando
- Aldo Cioffi
- Michele Cioffi
- Arnaldo Lucentini as (Himself)
- Nino Miloro
- Mario Sabbatella as (Himself)

== Bibliography ==
- Roberto Chiti & Roberto Poppi. Dizionario del cinema italiano. Gremese Editore, 1991.
