= Anna Arena =

Italian actress

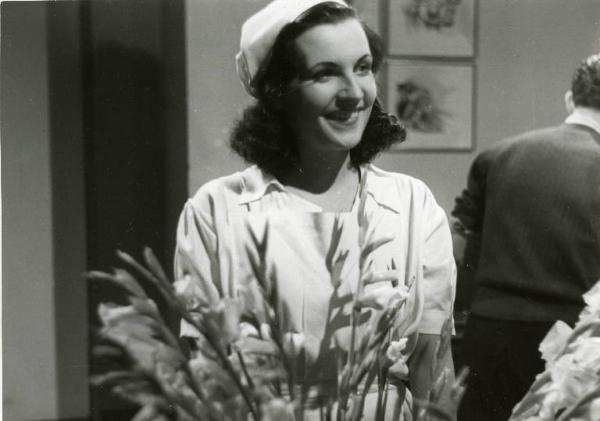
- Born: 21 June 1919; Quiliano, Liguria, Italy
- Died: 19 August 1974 (aged 55); Jesolo, Veneto, Italy
- Occupation: Actress
- Years active: 1942-1964 (film)

Anna Arena (June 21, 1919 – August 19, 1974) was an Italian film actress.

== Selected filmography ==
- Jealousy (1942)
- Vacation with a Gangster (1951)
- The Piano Tuner Has Arrived (1952)
- Beauties in Capri (1952)
- The Dream of Zorro (1952)
- The Ship of Condemned Women (1953)
- La lupa (1953)
- Orphan of the Ghetto (1954)
- It Takes Two to Sin in Love (1954)
- The Law (1959)
- Il bell'Antonio (1960)
- Queen of the Seas (1961)
- Hercules Against Rome (1964)

== Bibliography ==
- Gary Allen Smith. Epic Films: Casts, Credits and Commentary on More Than 350 Historical Spectacle Movies. McFarland, 2004.
