= His Young Wife =

1945 film

- Film poster
- Directed by: Mario Soldati
- Written by: Vittorio Bersezio; Aldo De Benedetti; Tullio Pinelli; Carlo Musso
- Produced by: Marcello D'Amico
- Starring: Carlo Campanini
- Cinematography: Massimo Terzano
- Edited by: Gisa Radicchi Levi
- Music by: Nino Rota
- Release date: 15 December 1945
- Running time: 100 minutes
- Country: Italy
- Language: Italian

His Young Wife (Italian: Le miserie del signor Travet) is a 1945 Italian comedy film directed by Mario Soldati. It was entered into the 1946 Cannes Film Festival.

== Cast ==
- Carlo Campanini - Monsù Ignazio Travet
- Vera Carmi - Madama Rosa Travet
- Paola Veneroni - Marianin Travet
- Pierluigi Veraldo - Carluccio Travet (as Pier Luigi Verando)
- Laura Gore - Brigida
- Gino Cervi - Il commandatore Francesco Battilocchio
- Luigi Pavese - Il capo sezione
- Mario Siletti - Môtôn
- Michele Malaspina - Rusca
- Gianni Agus - Velan
- Domenico Gambino - Monsù Giachetta
- Enrico Effernelli - Paôlin
- Alberto Sordi - Camillo Barbarotti
- Carlo Mazzarella - Paglieri, il notaio
- Felice Minotti - Giuan, il primo usciere
