= No Man's Land (1939 film) =

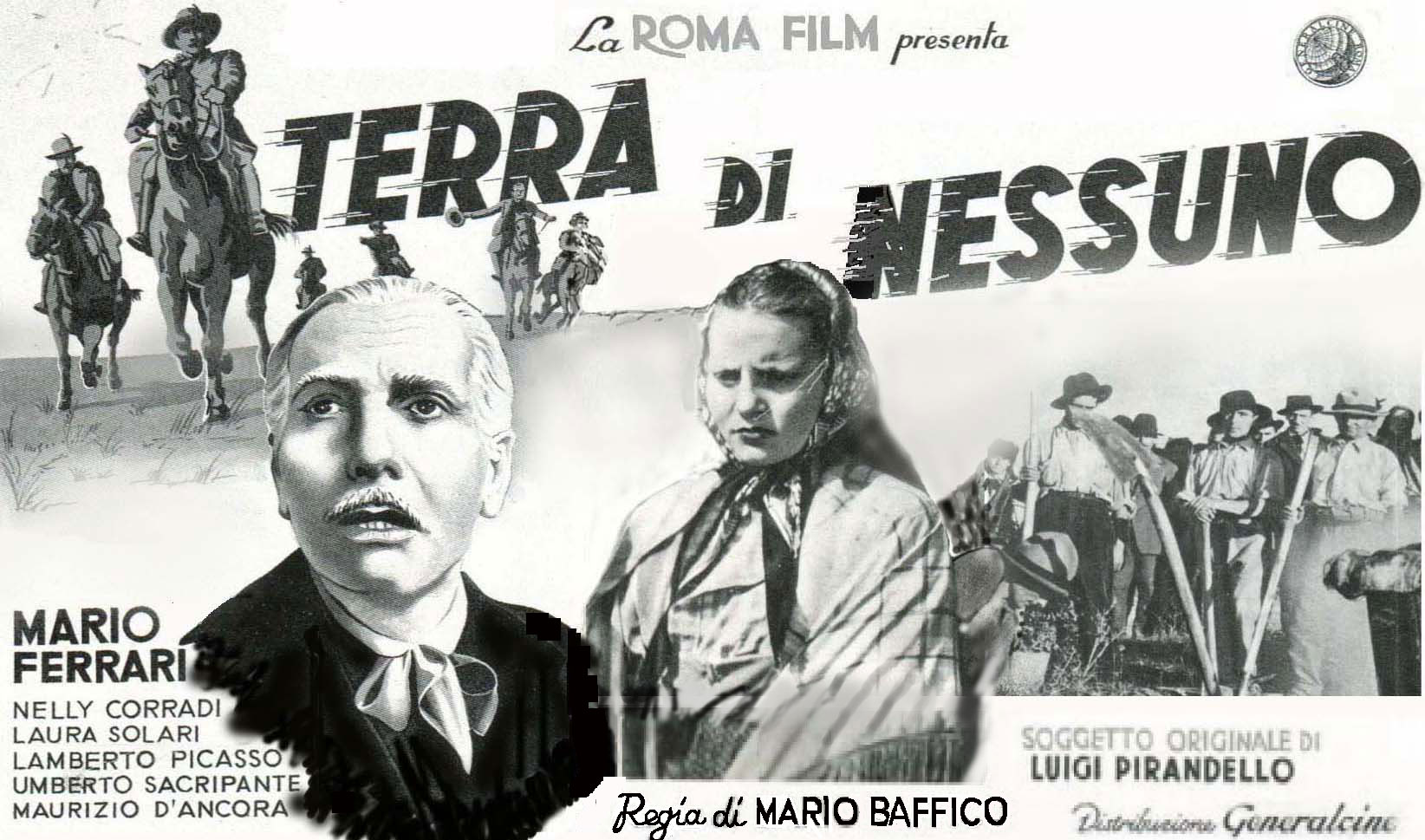
- Directed by: Mario Baffico
- Written by: Luigi Pirandello (novels); Stefano Landi; Corrado Alvaro; Mario Baffico; Stefano Landi
- Produced by: Francesco Giunta
- Starring: Mario Ferrari; Nelly Corradi; Laura Solari
- Cinematography: Ugo Lombardi; Fernando Risi; Augusto Tiezzi
- Edited by: Giorgio Simonelli
- Music by: Franco Casavola
- Production company: Roma Film
- Distributed by: Generalcine
- Release date: 17 April 1939
- Running time: 94 minutes
- Country: Italy
- Language: Italian

No Man's Land (Italian: Terra di nessuno) is a 1939 Italian drama film directed by Mario Baffico and starring Mario Ferrari, Nelly Corradi and Laura Solari. It is based on two novels by Luigi Pirandello.

The film's sets were designed by the art director Alberto Tavazzi. It was shot at the Cinecittà Studios in Rome. Location filming took place at Todi near Perugia.

== Cast ==
- Mario Ferrari as Pietro Gori
- Nelly Corradi as Elisabetta detta 'Bettina'
- Laura Solari as Grazia
- Umberto Sacripante as Rinaldo
- Maurizio D'Ancora as Rocco Securo
- Tina Pica as Maruzza
- Lamberto Picasso as Securo, il padre di Rocco
- Lola Braccini as La signora Securo
- Mario Mazza as Il maniscalco
- Vasco Creti as Il padre di Grazia
- Giovanni Grasso as Il puparo
- Dino Raffaelli as Il ciabattino
- Corrado De Cenzo as Il prefeto
- Virginia Balestrieri as La moglie del puparo
- Dhia Cristiani as La ragazza delle frittelle
- Alfredo Martinelli as L'avvocato dei Securo

== Bibliography ==
- Nina DaVinci Nichols. Pirandello and Film. University of Nebraska Press, 1995.
