= The Flight of Socrates =

1923 film

- Directed by: Guido Brignone
- Written by: Giovacchino Forzano
- Produced by: Eleuterio Rodolfi
- Starring: Carlo Aldini
- Cinematography: Maggiorino Zoppis
- Production company: Rodolfifilm
- Distributed by: Rodolfifilm
- Release date: March 1923
- Country: Italy
- Languages: Silent; Italian intertitles

The Flight of Socrates (Italian: La fuga di Socrate) is a 1923 Italian silent film directed by Guido Brignone and starring Carlo Aldini.

== Plot ==
Ajax accidentily startles Socrates, the pet parrot of his fiancé Annita, causing him to fly away through an open window. Annita says she will not marry Ajax until he returns Socrates to her. In his international search for the parrot, Ajax accidentally becomes a wanted man everywhere he goes. Socrates eventually is released to return home by his new owners, Liliana and her father, much to Annita's delight. While Socrates returns home, Ajax does not, because he finds the love of his life, Liliana, while searching for Socrates. The film ends with Annita’s parents scolding her for abusing Ajax’s love.

== Cast ==
- Carlo Aldini - Ajax (Aiace)
- Ruy Vismara - Annita
- Vasco Creti - Liliana's father
- Giuseppe Brignone - Annita's father
- Miss Rolfo - Liliana

== Bibliography ==
- Stewart, John. Italian Film: A Who's Who, McFarland, 1994.
