= Raffaele Viviani =

Italian author, playwright, actor and musician (1888–1950)

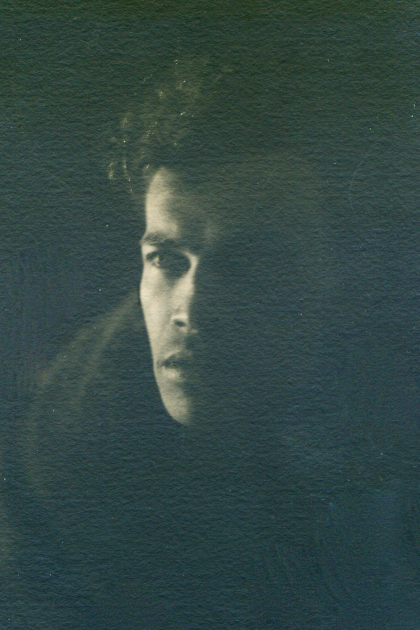
- Viviani in 1906
- Born: 10 January 1888; Castellammare di Stabia, Kingdom of Italy
- Died: 22 February 1950 (aged 62); Naples, Italy

Raffaele Viviani (10 January 1888 – 22 March 1950) was an Italian author, playwright, actor and musician. Viviani belongs to the turn-of-the-century school of realism in Italian literature, and his works touch on seamier elements of the lives of the poor in Naples of that period, such as petty crime and prostitution. Critics have termed Viviani "an autodidact realist", meaning that he acquired his skills through personal experience and not academic education.

Viviani appeared at age 4 on the stage, and by age 20 he had acquired a solid nationwide reputation as an actor and playwright. He also played in Budapest, Paris, Tripoli, and throughout South America during his career. His plays are in the "anti-Pirandello" style, less concerned with the psychology of people than with the lives they lead. Viviani's best known-work is L'ultimo scugnizzo (The Last Urchin) (1931), scugnizzo being the underclass Neapolitan street child. Viviani composed songs and incidental music for many of his earlier works. One such well-known melodrama is Via Toledo di notte (Via Toledo by Night), a 1918 work which even incorporates American cakewalk and ragtime rhythms to tell the story of the "street people" of Via Toledo, the most famous street in Naples.

== Selected filmography ==
- The Table of the Poor (1932)
- The Blue Fleet (1932)

== Partial bibliography ==
- A festa 'e Montevergine, in Rivista di Commedie, anno XIII, n. 50, fasc. I, pp. 5–14, March 1930.
- 'O fatto 'e cronaca, Napoli, Guida, 1932.
- L’imbroglione onesto, in Il Dramma, anno XIII, n. 266, 15 September 1937.
- Mestiere di padre, in Il Dramma, anno XV, n. 318, 15 November 1939.
- La tavola dei poveri, in Sipario, anno IX, n. 100–101, Aug-Sept 1954, pp. 43–61.
- Trentaquattro commedie scelte da tutto il teatro di Raffaele Viviani, a cura L. Ridenti, introduction by E. Possenti e saggio La commedia umana di Napoli di V. Pandolfi, 2 vol., Torino ILTE, 1957.
- Tuledo 'e notte, 'O fatto 'e cronaca, La musica dei ciechi, in Teatro Napoletano, a cura di G. Trevisani, Bologna, Guanda editor, 1957.
- La festa di Montevergine, con saggi di C. Mazza e C. Trabucco, Napoli, ESI, 1963.
- Circo equestre Sgueglia, a cura di E. Bellingeri, Roma, Officina Edizioni, 1978.
- I dieci comandamenti, presentazione di M. Martone, Napoli, Guida, 2000.
- Zingari, ivi, 2006.
- Canti di scena, a cura di P. Scialò, ivi, 2006.

A listing of Viviani's major works is also listed in:

- RAFFAELE VIVIANI, I capolavori, a cura di A. Lezza, prefazione di R. De Simone, con una nota musicale di P. Scialò, Napoli, Guida editori, 1992.

The complete theatrical output of Viviani is listed in:

- RAFFAELE VIVIANI, Teatro, voll. I-V, a cura di G. Davico Bonino, A. Lezza, P. Scialò, Napoli, Guida Editori, 1987–1991, vol. VI, a cura di A. Lezza, P. Scialò, introd. di G. Fofi, 1994.

== Published biographies, criticisms and essays concerning Viviani ==
- Da Russo a Viviani, A. Palermo, in ID., Da Mastriani a Viviani. Per una storia della letteratura a Napoli fra Otto e Novecento, Napoli, Liguori Editore, 1974, pp. 98–105.
- Il teatro di Viviani: lingua, dialetto, gergo, A. Lezza, in Lingua e dialetto nella tradizione letteraria italiana, AA.VV., Roma, Salerno editrice, 1996, pp. 537–551.
- Viviani. L’autore – L’interprete – Il cantastorie urbano, A. Lezza, P. Scalò, Napoli, Colonnese Editore, 2000.
- Viviani, a cura di M. Andria Napoli, Pironti, 2001.
- Raffaele Viviani. Teatro, poesia e musica, a cura di A. Lezza, P. Scialò, Napoli, CUEN, 2002.
- La funzione degli spazi: da Raffaele Viviani ad Annibale Ruccello, M. Palumbo, in La civile letteratura. Studi sull’Ottocento e il Novecento offerti ad Antonio Palermo, II, Il Novecento, AA. VV., Napoli, Liguori Editore, 2002, pp. 201–211.
- Commedia e dramma da Scarpetta a Viviani, G. Nicastro, in Letteratura e cultura a Napoli tra Otto e Novecento, AA. VV., a cura di E. Candela, Napoli, Liguori Editore, 2003, pp. 51–65.
- Raffaele Viviani. La compagnia, Napoli e l'Europa, V. Venturini, Roma, Bulzoni, 2008.
- Fondamentale ai fini di una ricostruzione biografica dell’A. è l’autobiografia Dalla vita alle scene, Rocca San Casciano, Cappelli, 1928, poi Napoli, Guida, 1977 e 1988.
- (chapter of V. VIVIANI): Raffaele Viviani, in ID., Storia del teatro napoletano, Napoli, Guida Editori, 1969, pp. 807–77 (n. ed. ivi, 1992).
- (monograph of G. TREVISANI): Raffaele Viviani, Rocca San Casciano, Cappelli, 1961.
