= Maschiaccio =

- Directed by: Augusto Genina
- Written by: Augusto Genina
- Starring: Fernanda Negri Pouget, Vasco Creti
- Cinematography: Narciso Maffeis
- Distributed by: Ambrosio-film, Turin
- Release date: 1917
- Country: Italy
- Language: Silent

Maschiaccio is a 1917 Italian silent film directed by Augusto Genina, about a tomboyish woman (the film's title translates literally to "tomboy") who eventually finds love and becomes a mother.

== Plot ==
Claretta (Fernanda Negri-Pouget) is a young woman who eschews feminine things and seeks to be as masculine as possible, but in her heart she still yearns for love. After a series of bitter experiences and disenchantments, she finally gives up her tomboyish tendencies, unites with her husband (Vasco Creti), and becomes a mother.

== Reception and influence ==
Maschiaccio premiered in Rome on November 20, 1917. Writing for La Cine-fono in Naples, Giuseppe Lega said that "although the film may not be strikingly original... it remains a truly distinguished cinematic work...a clear indication of [Genina's] profound desire to steer film production toward the wholesome beauty and artistic brilliance that await it in a promising future." Lega also praised Negri-Pouget's portrayal of Claretta, saying that in her performance she had "[brought] to light every minute detail and every subtle nuance".

Professor Lucia Re has argued that Maschiaccio, in which familiar and reassuring masculine and feminine roles eventually triumph over Claretta's boyish nature, illustrates contemporary Italian anxieties over fraying gender norms during World War I.

== Cast ==
- Oreste Bilancia
- Piera Bouvier
- Carlo Cattaneo
- Vasco Creti
- Fernanda Negri-Pouget
- Umberto Scalpellini
- Rosetta Solari
