= The Ship of Condemned Women =

1953 film by Raffaello Matarazzo

- Directed by: Raffaello Matarazzo
- Written by: Raffaello Matarazzo; Ennio De Concini; Aldo De Benedetti
- Produced by: Alfredo De Laurentiis; Nello Meniconi
- Starring: Kerima; May Britt; Ettore Manni
- Cinematography: Aldo Tonti
- Edited by: Leo Catozzo
- Music by: Nino Rota
- Production company: Excelsa Film
- Distributed by: Minerva Film
- Release date: 15 November 1953
- Running time: 101 minutes
- Country: Italy
- Language: Italian

The Ship of Condemned Women (Italian: La nave delle donne maledette) is a 1953 Italian historical adventure-melodrama film written and directed by Raffaello Matarazzo and starring Kerima, May Britt and Ettore Manni. It is loosely based on the novel Histoire de 130 femmes by Léon Gozlan. It was shot in Gevacolor. The film's sets were designed by the art director Piero Filippone.

== Synopsis ==
A young woman wrongly convicted or murder is sentenced to serve in a penal colony, departs on a ship carrying a hundred female prisoners.

== Cast ==
- Kerima as Rosario
- May Britt as Consuelo
- Ettore Manni as Da Silva
- Tania Weber as Isabella
- Gualtiero Tumiati as Pietro Silveris
- Olga Solbelli as Anita
- Luigi Tosi as Fernandez
- Marcella Rovena as Nora
- Elvy Lissiak as Carmen
- Romolo Costa as Manuel
- Eduardo Ciannelli as Michele
- Milly
- Giovanna Ralli
- Flo Sandon's
- Anna Arena
