= Sun (film) =

1929 film

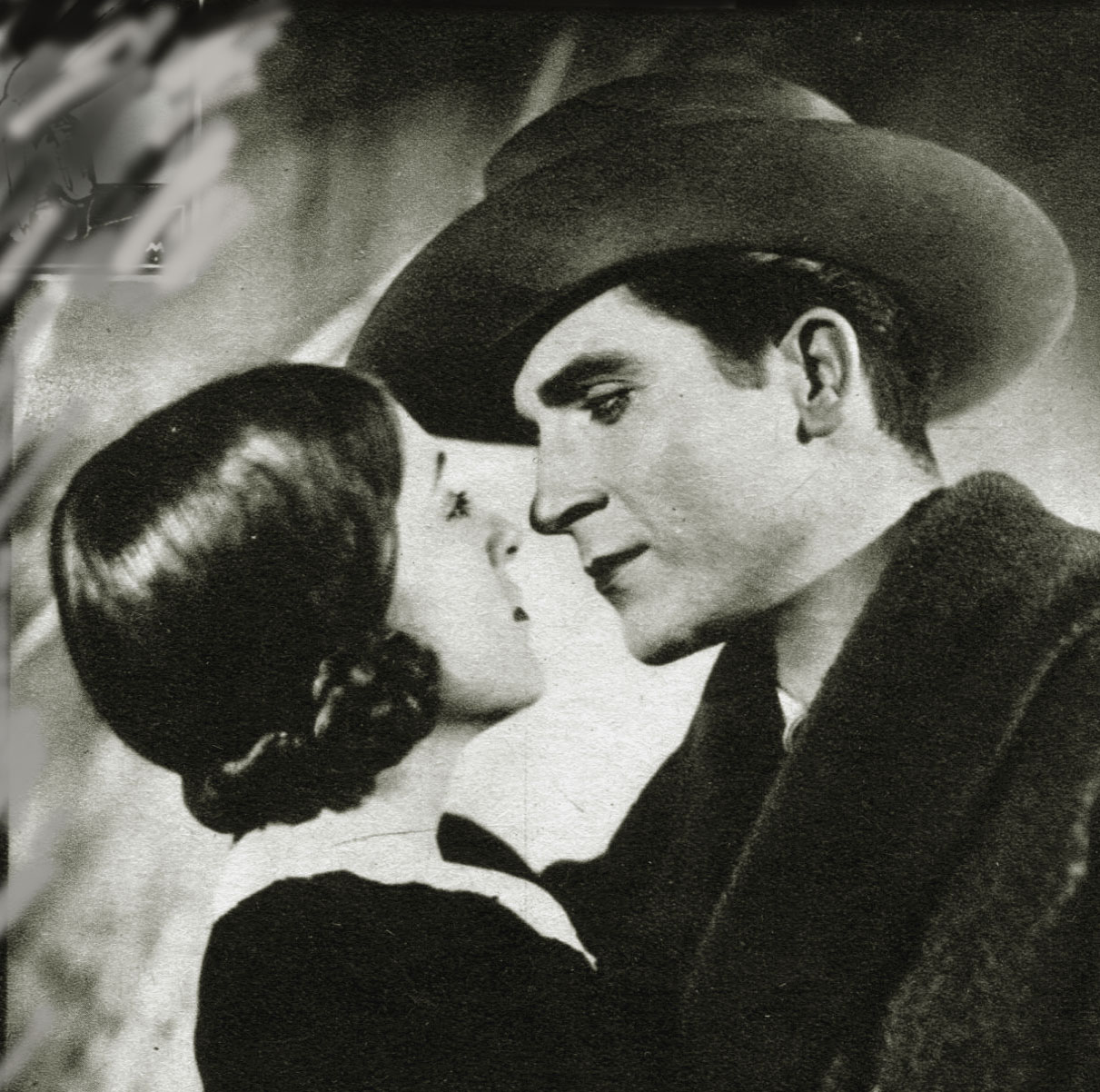
- Dria Paola and Marcello Spada
- Directed by: Alessandro Blasetti
- Written by: Aldo Vergano; Alessandro Blasetti
- Starring: Marcello Spada; Vasco Creti; Dria Paola; Vittorio Vaser
- Cinematography: Giuseppe Caracciolo; Carlo Montuori; Giorgio Orsini
- Edited by: Alessandro Blasetti
- Production company: Augustus Film
- Release date: 16 June 1929
- Running time: 76 minutes
- Country: Italy
- Languages: Silent; Italian intertitles

Sun (Italian: Sole) is a 1929 Italian silent drama film directed by Alessandro Blasetti and starring Marcello Spada, Vasco Creti and Dria Paola. The film was set around the planned draining of the Pontine Marshes by Benito Mussolini's Fascist government. It was shot partly on location, which added a sense of realism. Mussolini was impressed by the result and described it as "the dawn of the Fascist film".

The film was destroyed during the Second World War, and survives only in still photographs.

== Cast ==
- Marcello Spada as Ing. Rinaldi
- Vasco Creti as Marco
- Dria Paola as Giovanna
- Vittorio Vaser as Silvestro
- Lia Bosco as Barbara
- Anna Vinci
- Rolando Costantino
- Rinaldo Rinaldi
- Arcangelo Aversa
- Arnaldo Baldaccini
- Sante Bonaldo
- Vittorio Gonzi
- Igino Nunzio

== Bibliography ==
- Bondanella, Peter E. (2001). Italian Cinema: From Neorealism to the Present. Continuum International Publishing Group. ISBN 978-0-8264-1247-8.
- Reich, Jacqueline; Garofalo, Piero (7 May 2002). Re-viewing Fascism: Italian Cinema, 1922–1943. Indiana University Press. ISBN 978-0-253-10914-9.
