= Elio Crovetto =

Italian actor (1926–2000)

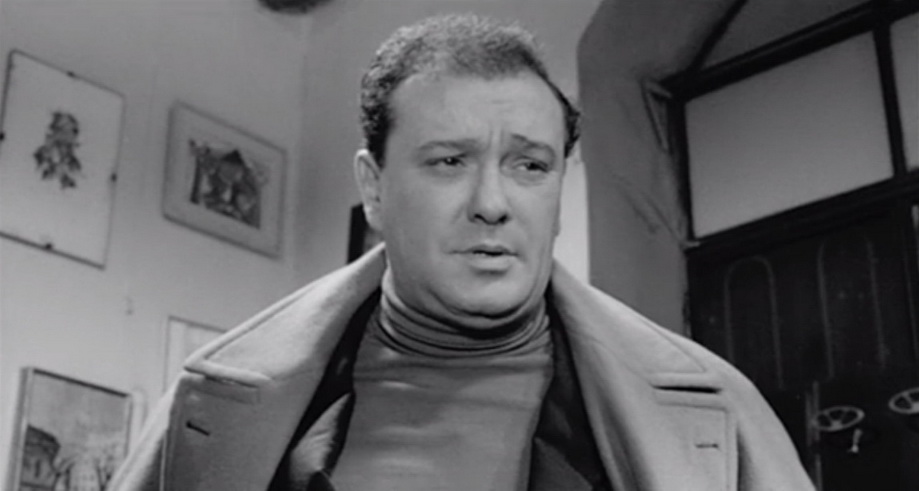
- Crovetto in La vita agra (1964)
- Born: 6 December 1926; Milan
- Died: 8 November 2000 (aged 73); Genoa

Elio Crovetto (6 December 1926 – 8 November 2000) was an Italian actor, comedian and television personality.

== Life and career ==
Born in Milan, Crovetto graduated at the istituto tecnico in Genoa, then he started an intense acting career on stage, in avanspettacolo and revues. He worked in the stage companies of Josephine Baker (in 1957) and Giorgio Strehler (for Baruffe Chiozzotte, 1970). From the late fifties Crovetto focused his career on cinema, being cast in a large number of comedy films, usually in character roles. He was also active in television, as an actor in a number of RAI TV-series, a comedian in several shows, and occasionally a presenter.

== Selected filmography ==
- Briscola (1951)
- La sceriffa (1959)
- Terror of the Red Mask (1960)
- Revenge of the Conquered (1961)
- The Swindlers (1963)
- La vita agra (1964)
- Honeymoon, Italian Style (1966)
- Don Juan in Sicily (1967)
- I due maghi del pallone (1970)
- Ma che musica maestro (1971)
- Naughty Nun (1972)
- Paolo il freddo (1974)
- Ecco noi per esempio (1977)
- Per vivere meglio, divertitevi con noi (1978)
- Delitto a Porta Romana (1980)
- Sugar, Honey and Pepper (1980)
- Days of Inspector Ambrosio (1988)
