= Goubbiah, mon amour =

- Directed by: Robert Darène
- Written by: René Barjavel; Jean Martet
- Produced by: Consortium de Productions de Films
- Starring: Jean Marais; Kerima
- Music by: Joseph Kosma
- Release date: 14 March 1956 (France)
- Running time: 96 minutes
- Countries: Italy; France
- Language: French
- Box office: 1,672,884 admissions (France)

Goubbiah, mon amour (English: "Goubbiah, my love") is a French romance drama film from 1956, directed by Robert Darène, written by René Barjavel, starring Jean Marais. The scenario was based on a novel of Jean Martet. The film was known under the title Fuga nel sole (Italy), Cita en el Sol (Spain), Kiss of Fire (UK), and Liebe unter heißem Himmel (West Germany).

== Cast ==
- Jean Marais : Goubbiah
- Kerima : Carola
- Delia Scala : Trinida
- Charles Moulin : Jao – Trinida's Father
- Henri Nassiet : Goubbiah's Father
- Gil Delamare : Peppo – Trinida's Fiancée
- Marie-José Darène : Minnie
- Henri Cogan : The Scarface
- Louis Bugette : Erika
