= Fatal Desire (film) =

1953 film directed by Carmine Gallone

- Directed by: Carmine Gallone
- Written by: Art Cohn; Francesco De Feo; Basilio Franchina; Carmine Gallone; Guido Menasci (libretto); Mario Monicelli; Giovanni Targioni-Tozzetti (libretto); Giovanni Verga
- Starring: May Britt; Anthony Quinn; Ettore Manni
- Cinematography: Riccardo Pallottini; Karl Struss
- Edited by: Rolando Benedetti
- Music by: Pietro Mascagni
- Distributed by: Minerva Film (Italy); Ultra Films Corp. (US)
- Release dates: 1953 (Italy); 9 January 1963 (United States)
- Country: Italy
- Language: Italian

Fatal Desire (Italian: Cavalleria rusticana) is a 3-D Italian musical melodrama film directed by Carmine Gallone. The film is based on the opera Cavalleria rusticana and stars May Britt, Anthony Quinn, Ettore Manni, and Kerima. For the vocal parts Quinn was dubbed by Tito Gobbi.

The film's sets were designed by the art director Gastone Medin.

== Cast ==
- May Britt as Santuzza
- Ettore Manni as Turiddu
- Kerima as Lola
- Anthony Quinn as Alfio
- Virginia Balestrieri as Mamma Lucia
- Umberto Spadaro as Uncle Brasi
- Grazia Spadaro as Aunt Camilla
