= L'ultimo amante =

1955 film

- Film poster
- Directed by: Mario Mattoli
- Written by: Augusto Camerini; Aldo De Benedetti; Mario Mattoli; Luciano Mattoli
- Produced by: Carlo Ponti
- Starring: Amedeo Nazzari
- Cinematography: Aldo Tonti
- Edited by: Roberto Cinquini
- Music by: Giovanni D'Anzi
- Distributed by: Cei-Incom
- Release date: 3 November 1955
- Running time: 98 minutes
- Country: Italy
- Language: Italian

L'ultimo amante (literally The Last Lover) is a 1955 Italian melodrama film directed by Mario Mattoli and starring Amedeo Nazzari and May Britt. It was a remake of Mattoli's 1942 film Nothing New Tonight. This version aptly concludes with the score of the famous prelude of La Traviata, by Giuseppe Verdi.

== Plot ==
The police round up a group of prostitutes and bring them to the station. Reporter Cesare recognizes Maria among them; years earlier, when he was struggling with alcoholism, she had saved him, only to disappear right after. He decides to return the favor and tries to change her life, but the return of Giorgio, her pimp, thwarts his efforts.

== Cast ==
- Amedeo Nazzari as Cesare Monti
- May Britt as Maria Spanisch
- Nino Besozzi as Dr. Moriesi
- Frank Latimore as Giorgio
- Elena Altieri as Director of the institute
- María Martín as Girl in the institute (as Mery Martin)
- Cesarina Gherardi as The landlady
- Ernesto Calindri as Newspaper manager
- Elli Parvo as Girl in the institute
- Guido Celano as Emergency doctor
- Aldo Pini as Nello, the accomplice
- Maria Zanoli as Supervisor
- Anna Carena as Housekeeper
