= Vittorio Vaser =

Italian stage and film actor

- Born: 12 June 1904; Turin, Italy
- Died: 30 October 1963 (aged 59); Rome, Italy
- Occupations: Film actor Stage actor
- Years active: 1926–1962 (film)

Vittorio Vaser (1904–1963) was an Italian stage and film actor. He appeared in Alessandro Blasetti's 1929 film Sun about the reclamation of the Pontine Marshes. He was the son of the actor Ernesto Vaser.

== Selected filmography ==
- Sun (1929)
- The Haller Case (1933)
- Aldebaran (1935)
- Don Bosco (1935)
- Tonight at Eleven (1938)
- The Pirate's Dream (1940)
- The Champion (1943)
- Other Times (1952)
- A Woman Alone (1956)
- Beatrice Cenci (1956)
- Rigoletto e la sua tragedia (1956)
- Warlord of Crete (1960)

== Bibliography ==
- Verdone, Luca. I Film di Alessandro Blasetti. Gremese Editore, 1989.
