= Sugar, Honey and Pepper =

- Directed by: Sergio Martino
- Written by: Castellano & Pipolo
- Starring: Pippo Franco; Lino Banfi; Renato Pozzetto
- Cinematography: Giancarlo Ferrando
- Music by: Detto Mariano
- Release date: 1980
- Country: Italy
- Language: Italian

Sugar, Honey and Pepper (Italian: Zucchero, miele e peperoncino) is a 1980 Italian comedy film directed by Sergio Martino.

== Plot ==
The film includes three episodes centered around the court hearing about misunderstandings and mishaps leading to a crime.

- "Zucchero": Due to a mugshot exchange, the insurance agent Valerio Milanese is mistaken for Matteo Pugliese, a dangerous murderer. A sexy journalist wanting a scoop ends up worsening the position of the man, who is chased by the police.
- "Miele": Giuseppe Mazzarelli, a graduate unable to find a job, disguises himself as a woman and gets hired as a maid. He ends up in a relationship with the unhappy and mistreated wife. He eventually gets her pregnant and the jealous, violent husband finds out Giuseppe's secret, injuring him down there as payback.

After the disappointing outcome of the hearing, Giuseppe decides to apply for another maid job.

- "Peperoncino": Taxi driver Plinio Carlozzi is involved in a kidnapping by a Sicilian Mafia clan for the purpose of a forced marriage.

== Cast ==
- Lino Banfi: Valerio Milanese
- Edwige Fenech: Amalia Passalacqua
- Pippo Franco: Giuseppe Mazzarelli
- Dagmar Lassander: Mara Mencacci
- Renato Pozzetto: Plinio Carlozzi
- Enzo Robutti: Inspector Genovese
- Patrizia Garganese: Rosalia Mancuso
- Glauco Onorato: Duilio Mencacci
- Gianfranco Barra: Judge
- Sal Borgese: Alfio
- Sandro Ghiani: Saruzzo
- Franca Scagnetti: Mother of Rosalia
- Elio Crovetto: Scarnicchia
- Renzo Marignano: Aurelio Battistini
