= Giovanni Dolfini =

Italian actor (1885–1968)

- Born: 8 January 1885; Venice, Veneto, Italy
- Died: 9 December 1968 (aged 83); Rome, Lazio, Italy
- Occupation: Actor
- Years active: 1911–1966 (film & TV)

Giovanni Dolfini (1885-1968) was an Italian stage and film actor. He also directed the 1920 silent film Dopo.

== Selected filmography ==
- Agrippina (1911)
- The Last Adventure (1932)
- Sleeping Beauty (1942)
- Catene invisibili (1942)
- A Yank in Rome (1946)
- Hotel Luna, Room 34 (1946)
- Honeymoon Deferred (1950)
- Who Is Without Sin (1952)
- The Dream of Zorro (1952)
- Cani e gatti (1952)
- Torna! (1954)

== Bibliography ==
- Giacomo Gambetti. Vittorio Gassmann. Gremese Editore, 1999.
