= The Table of the Poor =

1932 film

- Directed by: Alessandro Blasetti
- Written by: Raffaele Viviani (play); Emilio Cecchi; Alessandro De Stefani; Mario Soldati; Alessandro Blasetti
- Starring: Raffaele Viviani; Leda Gloria; Salvatore Costa; Marcello Spada
- Cinematography: Giulio De Luca; Carlo Montuori
- Edited by: Ignazio Ferronetti
- Music by: Roberto Caggiano; Raffaele Viviani
- Production company: Società Italiana Cines
- Distributed by: Cinès-Pittaluga
- Release date: 1932
- Running time: 71 minutes
- Country: Italy
- Language: Italian

The Table of the Poor (Italian: La tavola dei poveri) is a 1932 Italian drama film directed by Alessandro Blasetti and starring Raffaele Viviani, Leda Gloria and Salvatore Costa. It was based on a play by Viviani set in Naples. It was shot at the Cines Studios in Rome. The film's sets were designed by Gastone Medin. It portrays the adventures of an impoverished Marquis who continues to lead a grand lifestyle.

== Main cast ==
- Raffaele Viviani as Marquis Isidoro Fusaro
- Leda Gloria as Giorgina Fusaro
- Salvatore Costa as Biase
- Marcello Spada as Nello Valmadonna
- Mario Ferrari as Attorney Volterra
- Vincenzo Flocco as Mezzapalla
- Armida Cozzolino as Lida Valmadonna
- Lina Bacci as The secretary
- Cesare Zoppetti as The teacher
- Vasco Creti as The waiter
- Idolo Tancredi as Il creditore delle camicie stirate
- Gennaro Pisano as Il commissario

== Bibliography ==
- Landy, Marcia. The Folklore of Consensus: Theatricality in the Italian Cinema, 1930-1943. SUNY Press, 1998.
- Mancini, Elaine. Struggles of the Italian Film Industry during Fascism. UMI Research Press, 1985.
- Moliterno, Gino. Historical Dictionary of Italian Cinema. Scarecrow Press, 2008.
