= The Dance of Time =

- Directed by: Mario Baffico
- Written by: Emilio De Martino (novel); Ivo Perilli; Cesare Zavattini
- Starring: Marcello Spada; Ugo Ceseri; Luigi Almirante
- Cinematography: Carlo Montuori
- Edited by: Ignazio Ferronetti
- Music by: Mario Mariotti
- Production company: B.M. Società Cinematografica
- Distributed by: Consorzio Italiano Film
- Release date: December 1936
- Running time: 80 minutes
- Country: Italy
- Language: Italian

The Dance of Time or more literally The Dance of the Clock Hands (Italian: La danza delle lancette) is a 1936 Italian sports comedy film directed by Mario Baffico and starring Marcello Spada, Ugo Ceseri and Luigi Almirante. It was one of only three films which the leading lady Barbara Monis appeared in.

It was shot at the Cines Studios in Rome. The film's sets were designed by the art director Giorgio Pinzauti.

== Synopsis ==
A young nobleman takes up motor racing despite the disapproval of his father. After a number of obstacles are overcome, he eventually triumphs at the Tripoli Grand Prix in Italian Libya. In the process he has met the girl of his dreams.

== Cast ==
- Barbara Monis as Anna Maria Rocchi
- Marcello Spada as Arnaldo
- Ugo Ceseri as Rocchi padre
- Luigi Almirante as Il conte di Aragona
- Laura Nucci
- Claudio Ermelli
- Rosina Adrario
- Silvio Bagolini
- Lucia Brunelli as La bambina
- Carlo Chertier
- Rolando Costantino
- Nora D'Alba
- Giuseppe Ricagno
- Gian Paolo Rosmino
- Umberto Sacripante
- Carla Sveva
- Osvaldo Valenti
- Nietta Zocchi
- Cesare Zoppetti

== Reception ==
Filippo Sacchi in the Corriere della Sera praised the conception of the film but found the production fragmentary, especially its last part.

A review in Bianco e Nero, in March 1937, was very critical of the film, particularly the plot and acting, and stated, ”nothing in it is explored thoroughly".

== Bibliography ==
- Enrico Lancia & Roberto Poppi. Le attrici: dal 1930 ai giorni nostri. Gremese Editore, 2003.
