= Maria Donati =

Italian stage, film, and television actress

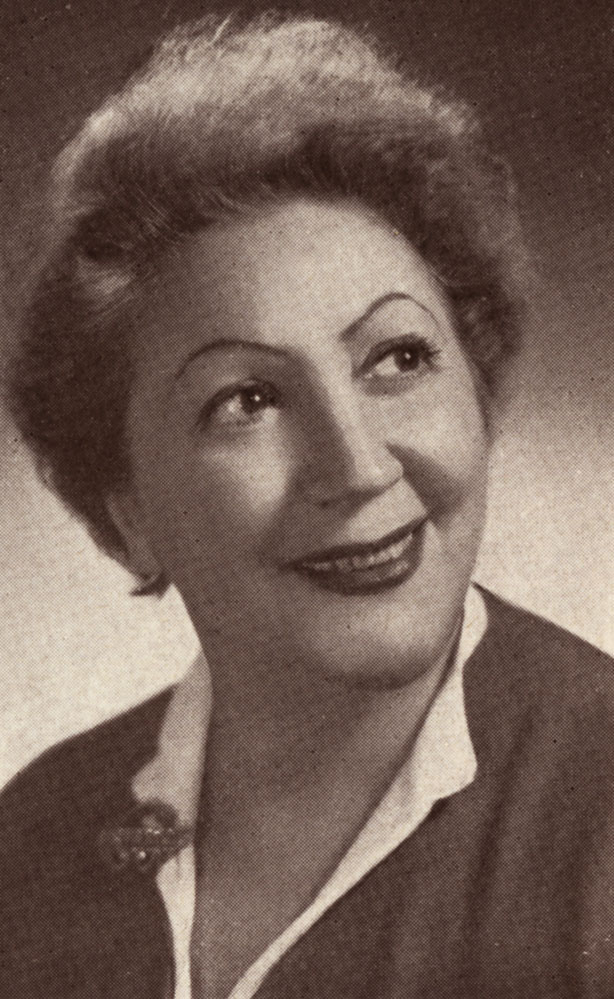
- Born: 2 December 1898; Rome, Lazio, Italy
- Died: 4 December 1966 (aged 68); Mexico City, Mexico
- Occupation: Actress
- Years active: 1932–1958 (film)

Maria Donati (1898–1966) was an Italian stage, film and television actress.

== Selected filmography ==
- Five to Nil (1932)
- The Ferocious Saladin (1937)
- The Count of Brechard (1938)
- Life Begins Anew (1945)
- Departure at Seven (1946)
- L'onorevole Angelina (1947)
- The Transporter (1950)
- The Passaguai Family (1951)

== Bibliography ==
- Maurizio Porro & Ernesto G. Laura. Alida Valli. Gremese Editore, 1996.
