= Angelina (film) =

1947 Italian film

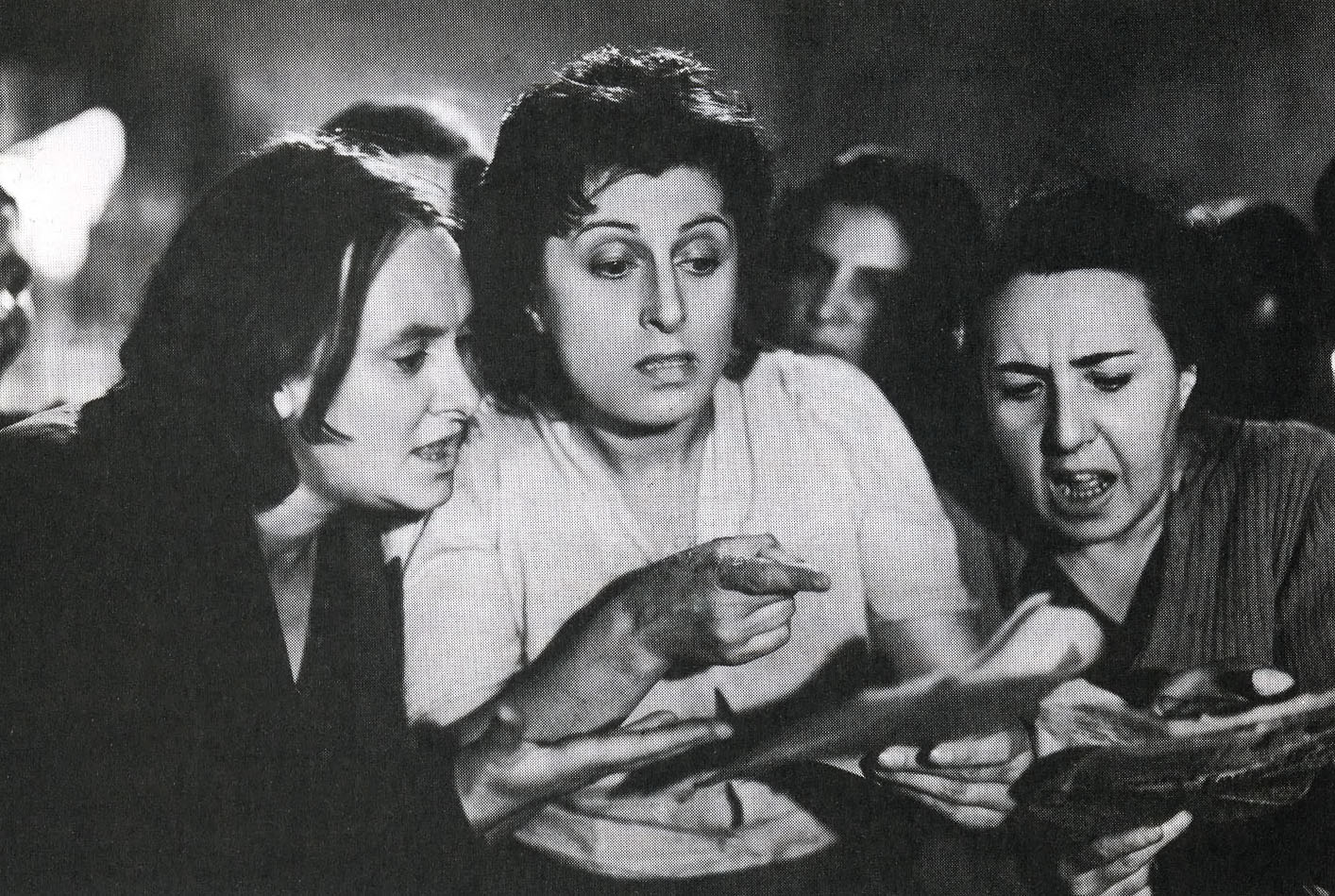
- Ave Ninchi and Anna Magnani
- Directed by: Luigi Zampa
- Written by: Piero Tellini; Suso Cecchi d'Amico; Luigi Zampa
- Produced by: Paolo Frasca
- Starring: Anna Magnani
- Cinematography: Mario Craveri
- Edited by: Eraldo Da Roma
- Music by: Enzo Masetti
- Production companies: Lux Film; Ora Film
- Release date: 1947
- Running time: 90 minutes
- Country: Italy
- Language: Italian

Angelina (Italian: L'onorevole Angelina) is a 1947 Italian comedy film directed by Luigi Zampa starring Anna Magnani. The film was presented at the 1947 Venice Film Festival, where Magnani was awarded the Volpi Cup for Best Actress.

In 2008, the film was included on the Italian Ministry of Cultural Heritage's 100 Italian films to be saved, a list of 100 films that "have changed the collective memory of the country between 1942 and 1978."

== Cast ==
- Anna Magnani – Angelina Bianchi
- Nando Bruno – Pasquale Bianchi
- Ave Ninchi – Carmela
- Ernesto Almirante – Luigi
- Agnese Dubbini – Cesira
- Armando Migliari – Callisto Garrone
- Maria Donati – Signora Garrone
- Maria Grazia Francia – Annetta Bianchi
- Vittorio Mottini – Roberto
- Franco Zeffirelli – Filippo Garrone
- Gianni Musy – Libero Bianchi (as Gianni Glori)
- Ughetto Bertucci – pharmacist (as Ugo Bertucci)
- Anita Angius – Adriana Bianchi
