= Hercules, Prisoner of Evil =

- Directed by: Anthony Dawson; Ruggero Deodato
- Screenplay by: Marcello Sartarelli
- Produced by: Adelpho Ambrosiano
- Starring: Reg Park; Mireille Granelli; Ettore Manni; Furio Meniconi
- Cinematography: Gabor Pogany
- Edited by: Otello Clangeli
- Music by: Franco Mannino
- Production companies: Ambrosiana Cinematografica; Adelphia Productions
- Release date: 31 July 1964 (Italy)
- Running time: 100 minutes
- Country: Italy
- Language: Italian

Hercules, Prisoner of Evil (Italian: Ursus il terrore dei Kirghisi, lit. 'Ursus, Terror of the Kirghiz') is a 1964 Italian peplum film directed by Anthony Dawson and an uncredited Ruggero Deodato. Deodato, credited as assistant director, replaced Margheriti who was busy with the completion of the film The Fall of Rome. The film is filled with a variety of horrific themes and elements, featuring a killer werewolf, and is as much a horror film as it is a peplum.

== Plot ==
The mighty Ursus is given a potion to drink that transforms him on certain nights into a murderous werewolf. Ursus kills several innocent people in the forest before realizing that he himself is the creature the local villagers are seeking to destroy. Ursus is referred to as Hercules in the English-dubbed prints.

== Cast ==
- Reg Park as Ursus
- Mireille Granelli as Aniko
- Ettore Manni as Ido
- Furio Meniconi as Zereteli
- Maria Teresa Orsini as Kato
- Lilly Mantovani as slave
- Serafino Fuscagni as Mico
- Ugo Carboni
- Claudio Scarchilli
- Gaetano Quartararo
- Giulio Maculani

== Release ==
Hercules, Prisoner of Evil was released in Italy on July 31, 1964.

== See also ==
- List of films featuring Hercules
