= Marcello Spada =

Italian film actor

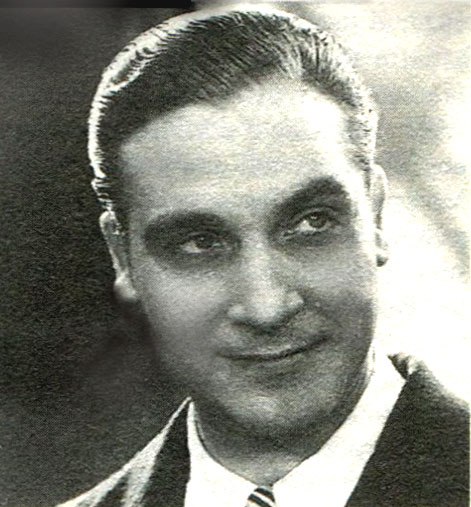
- Born: 16 January 1905; Rome, Italy
- Died: 1995 (aged 89–90); Italy
- Occupation: Actor
- Years active: 1928-1937

Marcello Spada (1905–1995) was an Italian film actor. He appeared in a dozen films, often in the leading role, between 1928 and 1937. After retiring from cinema he later became a doctor.

== Selected filmography ==
- Kif Tebbi (1928)
- Sun (1929)
- My Childish Father (1930)
- The Table of the Poor (1932)
- Tourist Train (1933)
- The Dance of Time (1936)
- Scipio (1937)
- In Venice, One Night (1937)

== Bibliography ==
- Ruth Ben-Ghiat. Italian Fascism's Empire Cinema. Indiana University Press, 2015.
