= Henny Koch =

German children's author and translator

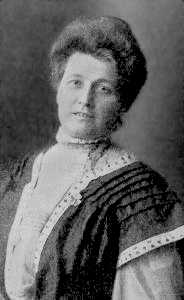
- Koch before 1905
- Born: 22 September 1854; Alsfeld, Hessen, Germany
- Died: 13 June 1925 (aged 70); Jugenheim an der Bergstraße, Hessen, Germany
- Occupations: Writer, translator
- Writing career
- Genre: Children's literature
- Notable work: Papas Junge

Henny Koch (22 September 1854 – 13 June 1925) was a German children's author and translator. She was born in Alsfeld, Grand Duchy of Hesse. From 1898 on, she lived in Jugenheim an der Bergstraße in Hessia, Germany, where she died in 1925. She produced the first German translation of Mark Twain's The Adventures of Huckleberry Finn in 1890. Henny Koch wrote 29 books, primarily targeting a young female audience. Her books were often serialized in the bourgeois illustrated girls' magazine "Das Kränzchen". Some titles were published in eight countries. Her most successful work was a series of novels, beginning with Papas Junge, in which you can accompany the protagonist through her life as a young girl, a mother and grandmother. A film has been made based on this novel Il birichino di papà, Italy, 1943, directed by Raffaello Matarazzo with music by Nino Rota.

== Works ==
=== Children's books ===
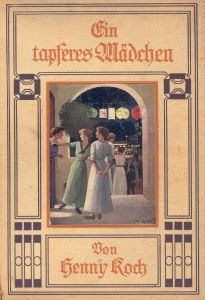
Ein tapferes maedchen

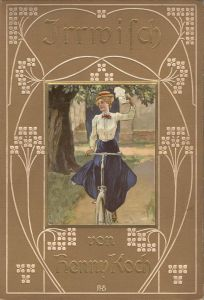
Irrwisch

- 1901 Mein Sonnenstrahl
- 1902 Das Mägdlein aus der Fremde
- 1904 Rose Maries Weg zum Glück
- 1905 Papas Junge
- 1905 Die Traut
- 1906 Mütterchen Sylvia
- 1907 Allerlei Lustiges für unsere Buben und Mädels
- 1907 Irrwisch
- 1908 Aus großer Zeit
- 1908 Die ins Leben lachen
- 1909 Friedel Polten und ihre Rangen
- 1910 Kleine Geschichten für kleine Leute
- 1911 Evchen der Eigensinn
- 1911 Das Komteßchen
- 1912 Im Lande der Blumen
- 1914 Ein tapferes Mädchen
- 1916 Die Vollrads in Südwest
- 1916 Die Patentochter des alten Fritz
- 1916 Wildes Lorle
- 1917 Die verborgene Handschrift
- 1917 Aus sonnigen Tagen
- 1919 Klein Großchen
- 1921 Glory
- 1922 Von der Lach-Els und anderen
- 1922 Jungfer Ursel
- 1924 Das Heiterlein
- 1925 Hochgeborene
- 1930 Wir fünf
