= William M. Kramer =

American rabbi and academic (1920 – 2004)

- Born: William Mordecai Kramer; March 29, 1920; Cleveland, Ohio, US
- Died: June 8, 2004 (aged 84); Los Angeles, California, US
- Resting place: Hillside Memorial Park Cemetery
- Education: Jewish Institute of Religion; Hebrew Union College-Jewish Institute of Religion; University of West Los Angeles
- Alma mater: Case Western Reserve University
- Occupation: Rabbi
- Spouses: Joan Oppenheim Kramer; Betty Wagner Kramer
- Children: 2

William Mordecai Kramer (March 29, 1920 – June 8, 2004) was an American rabbi, university professor and art collector. He served as the rabbi of Temple Beth Emet in Burbank, California from 1965 to 1996. He was an associate professor of religious studies at the California State University, Northridge for two decades, where he established the Jewish Studies program.

== Early life ==
William Mordecai Kramer was born in 1920 in Cleveland, Ohio.

He graduated from Case Western Reserve University. He went on to receive two more degrees in Jewish theology from Jewish Institute of Religion and was ordained as a rabbi in 1944. He returned to Case Western, where he earned a master's degree in Education and Social Work. He later earned a doctorate from the Hebrew Union College-Jewish Institute of Religion in Los Angeles, California and a law degree from the University of West Los Angeles.

== Rabbinates ==
His first rabbinate was in St. Louis, Missouri at the age of twenty-two. Shortly after moving to California, he served as the rabbi of Temple Israel of Hollywood in Hollywood, Los Angeles. It was there that he conducted the interracial wedding of African-American singer and dancer Sammy Davis Jr. with Swedish-born actress May Britt on November 13, 1960.

He served as the rabbi of Temple Beth Emet in Burbank, California from 1965 to 1996. When he stepped down, he was replaced by Rabbi Mark H. Sobel. According to Rabbi Sobel, "Probably some 80 percent of the Jews in the San Fernando Valley had a relative or friend who was married, buried or bar mitzvahed by Rabbi Bill." He conducted over 10,000 weddings, including many interfaith weddings. In the latter instance, he insisted that children be raised in the Jewish faith.

During his rabbinate at Temple Beth Emet, he also conducted a weekly minyan, or prayer, at Congregation Adat Shalom in Cheviot Hills, Los Angeles. He also led a "cyberspace" named B'nai Bill.

== Academic career ==
He was an associate professor of religious studies at the California State University, Northridge for two decades, where he established the Jewish Studies program. He also taught classes at the University of Judaism in Bel Air, the University of Southern California, the University of California, Los Angeles, Los Angeles City College.

He was a contributor to the December 1973 issue of American Jewish Historical Quarterly, published by the American Jewish History, entitled 'The Centennial of Reform Judaism in America.'

He edited The American West and the Religious Experience published by the Western American Study Series in Los Angeles in 1974. It was reviewed in The Journal of Arizona History, the journal of the Arizona Historical Society, by Dan K. Thrapp, the religion editor of The Los Angeles Times from 1951 to 1975. Thrapp regretted that the book was so "parochial" as it only dealt with the "American West" instead of the construct of the "frontier". It was also reviewed in The Journal of San Diego History by Lionel U. Ridout, a professor of history at San Diego State University.

He was the co-editor of Western States Jewish History with Dr. Norton B. Stern. In 1978, they published San Francisco's Artist: Toby E. Rosenthal, published by the Santa Susana Press of Northridge. It was reviewed in Southern California Quarterly, the journal of the Historical Society of Southern California, by Thomas S. McNeill. He called it, "a readable, well researched, biography of a gifted early San Francisco artist."

He wrote a weekly column in Jewish Heritage newspaper, a Jewish weekly newspaper in Los Angeles with a circulation of 44,000.

== Acting career ==
As an actor, he starred in The Seventh Sign, a 1988 biblical movie with Demi Moore. He also starred on episodes of Sisters and L.A. Law. He was also featured in advertisements for bagels and yoghurts.

== Documentary ==
In 1996, an hour-long documentary about his life, Beyond the Pulpit: Facets of a Rabbi, was released.

== Art collection ==
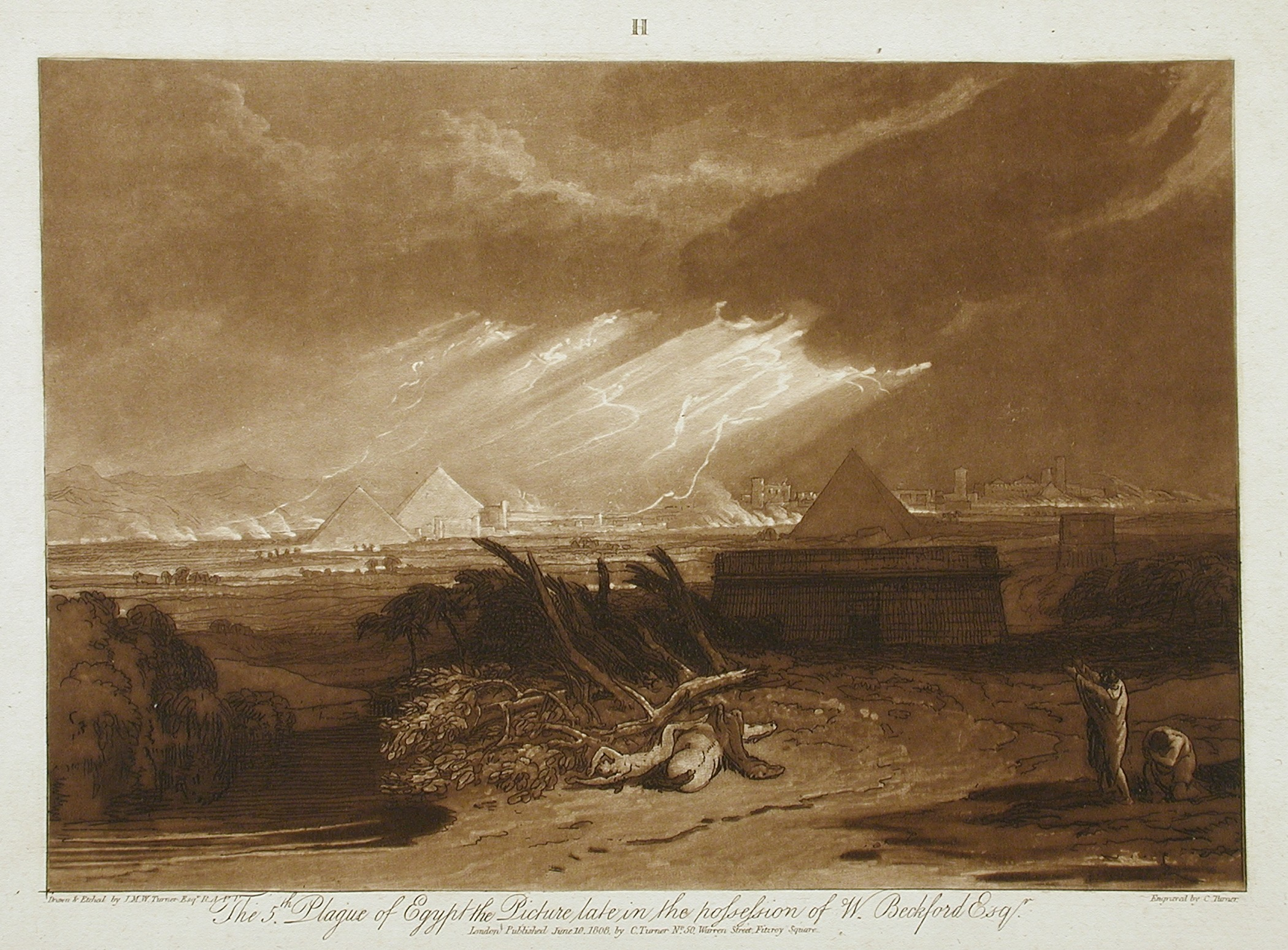
Charles Turner. The Fifth Plague of Egypt. Engraving, 1808.

He was a collector of German Expressionist paintings. He donated most of his collection to the Los Angeles County Museum of Art (LACMA). Some of the artwork he donated include Hula Drum (Tambor), a 1950 print by Jean Charlot, Verona, a 1951 print by Eugene Berman, Head by Max Weber and E. Weyhe, an untitled street scene by Ludwig Meidner, another untitled print by Jakob Steinhardt, and Adam and Eve by Max Beckmann. He also donated an engraving by Charles Turner titled The Fifth Plague of Egypt.

He was also a collector of Judaica. Most of this collection was donated by Kramer to the Skirball Cultural Center and the Western Jewish History Association.

== Personal life ==
He was married twice. His first marriage was to Joan Oppenheim Kramer, who died in 1980. They had two sons, Dr. Jonathan L. Kramer (b. 1954), and Jeremy S Kramer (b. 1955, d. 2006). He then married Betty Wagner Kramer, who was the widow of Rabbi Joseph Wagner.

== Death ==
He died of diabetes-related complications at the Ronald Reagan UCLA Medical Center in Los Angeles, California. He was eighty-four years old. He was buried at Hillside Memorial Park Cemetery, a Jewish cemetery in Culver City, California, during a ceremony with Rabbi Sobel, Rabbis Toba August and Rabbi Michael Resnick.
