= Kerima (actress) =

French actress (1925–2014)

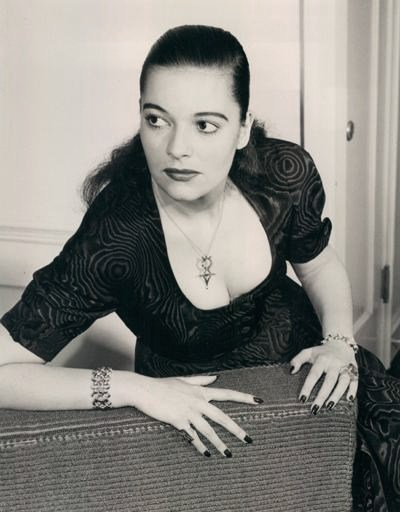
- Kerima in 1952
- Born: Miriam Charrière; 10 February 1925; Toulouse, France
- Died: July 2014 (aged 89)
- Occupation: Actress
- Years active: 1951–1970s
- Spouses: Alexis Revidis (m. 1953, divorced) Guy Hamilton (m. 1964)

Miriam Charrière, better known as Kerima (10 February 1925 – July 2014) was a French actress best known for her role in the 1951 British film Outcast of the Islands. For publicity reasons, she was portrayed as having exotic origins including claims that she was Javanese or Algerian.

== Film career ==
Outcast of the Islands was set in Indonesia and Kerima's role was that of a native girl. In casting the role, director Carol Reed sought someone "seductive, radiant", "as the soul of the country with its mysterious forests". He felt no available actresses were right for the part. In an interview with Der Spiegel, he claimed to have searched for almost a year in Egypt, Singapore, and Borneo, auditioning "dancers, fashion models, beauty queens" before friends recommended Kerima, "daughter of a very wealthy Arab in Algiers". Although her background was not Indonesian, film publicity sought to portray her as an indigenous islander. In London, she was quoted as saying "I live the life of Nature. I ride bareback, I walk barefoot, I swim bare." As she had no acting experience, her role was completely non-verbal. Reed never used the voice of amateurs or children in his films. Had her voice been used, a French accent would have been obvious. Publicity for the film made much use of a scene that included a kiss lasting 112 seconds. This "marathon kiss" was the subject of a Life magazine cover story. Some critics considered it "shocking", and it caused "difficulty" with American censors.

Kerima was active in film throughout the 1950s and early 1960s, working with Italian and American directors including Joseph Mankiewicz and Howard Hawks and at one time under contract to Dino De Laurentiis. Her last known work consisted of minor roles in 1972, the last being a bellydancer in an episode of the British television series The Adventurer.

== Ethnicity ==
To create more publicity for Kerima and the movie Outcast, an 'exotic island girl' image consistent with her role was created by the film's executive producer, Alexander Korda. He claimed she was born in Algeria. A search of birth records in Algerian newspapers conducted around 2006 did not find any record of her birth. Her husband Guy Hamilton, an assistant director of Outcast, was then contacted and asked about Kerima's background. He confirmed that she was born in France to French parents, was a French citizen, and that Korda created the stage name Kerima (which means 'Noble' in Arabic) and the associated persona of an exotic Javanese native to promote the film.

Her exotic looks enabled her to play many nationalities, including an Egyptian in Land of the Pharaohs, a Vietnamese in The Quiet American, and an Italian in La Lupa. In addition to Algerian, she has also been described as "a beautiful Pakistani actress", as well as Italian, Indonesian, and Tunisian.

== Personal life ==
Kerima, real name Miriam Charrière, was born in Toulouse to French parents. She studied medicine before finding success in acting. (Another source says that she was "selling jewellery in the South of France".) By age 23, she was fluent in French, Spanish, and Italian. She was "discovered" in Paris by the director of Outcast of the Islands, Carol Reed.

In January 1953, Kerima secretly married Greek actor Alexis Revidis in Rome; the couple did not publicize the marriage until October. They were later divorced. Her second marriage was to Guy Hamilton, who was an assistant director for Outcast of the Islands, after they met again many years later in Rome. They lived in a villa in Andratx on the Mediterranean island of Mallorca from the mid-1970s.

Kerima died in July 2014, at the age of 89. Hamilton died in April 2016.

== Magazine covers ==
Among others, Kerima was the subject of the following magazine covers:

- 19 May 1952 issue of Life magazine.
- 30 August 1952 issue of Tempo.
- 22 February 1952 issue of Ciné Télé Revue
- 19 January 1952 issue of Picturegoer
- 24 January 1951 issue of Der Spiegel
- 8 February 1952 issue of Cinémonde

== Filmography ==
- Aissa in Outcast of the Islands, 1951
- The 'She-Wolf' in La lupa (She Wolf), 1953
- Rosario in The Ship of Condemned Women, 1953
- Lola in Fatal Desire (Cavalleria Rusticana), 1953
- Madalena in Tom Toms of Mayumba (Tam Tam Mayumbe) or Native Drums (Mondo Keazunt), 1955
- Queen Nailla in Land of the Pharaohs, 1955
- Lola in I am the Scarlet Pimpernel (Io sono la primula rossa), 1955
- Carola in Goubbiah, My Love, (Goubbiah, mon amour), (Kiss of Fire), 1956
- Phuong's Sister (Miss Hel) in The Quiet American, 1958
- The Warrior and the Slave Girl (La Rivolta dei gladiatori), 1958
- Carmen Herrera in World of Miracles (Il Mondo dei Miracoli), 1959
- Maya in The Night of the Great Attack (La notte del grande assalto), 1959
- Virginia Toriello in Jessica, 1962
- Unnamed girl in The Love Box, 1972
- Belly dancer in The Adventurer, 1972 (TV series)
