= Chiaretta Gelli =

Italian singer and film actress

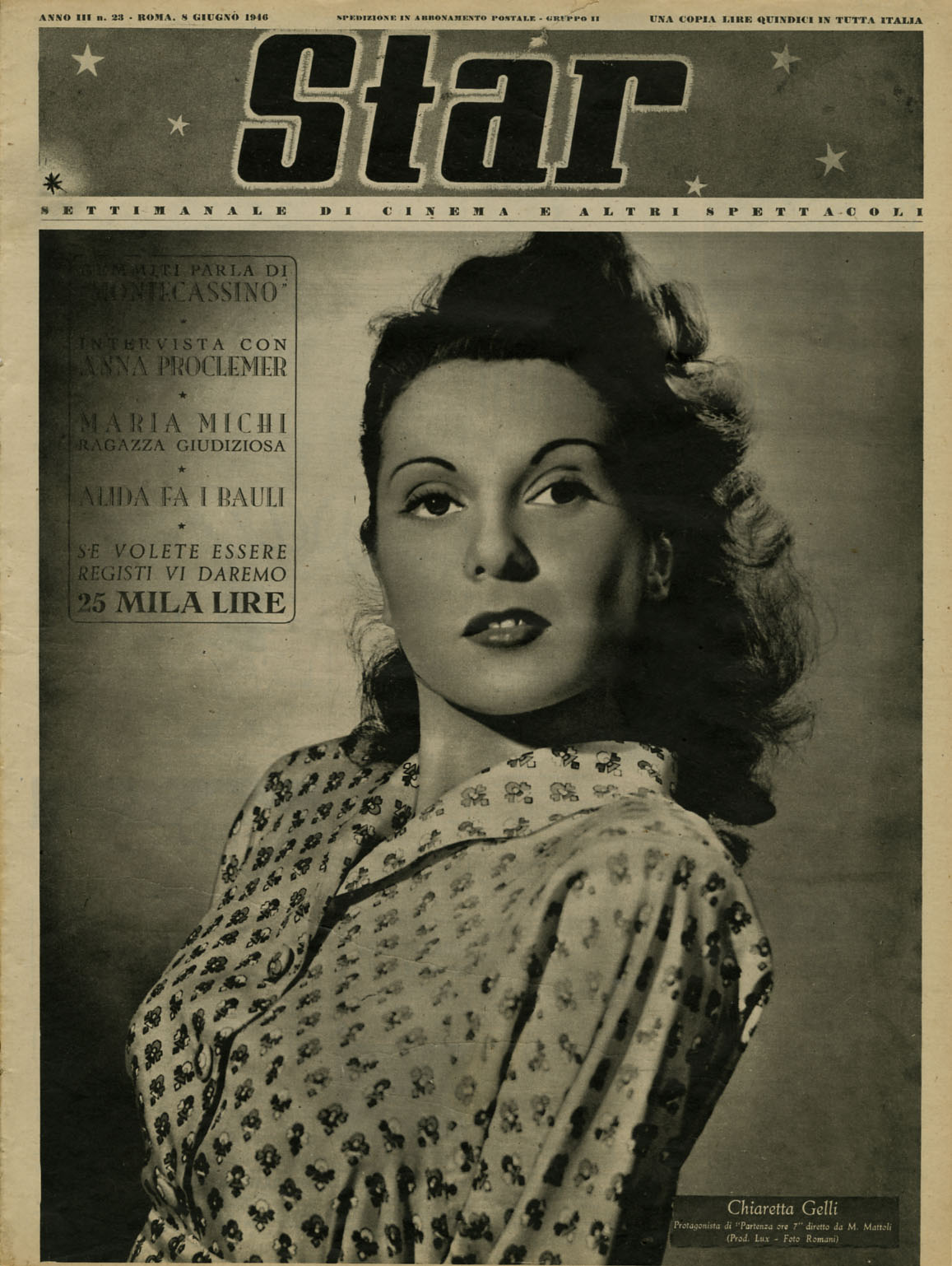
- Gelli on a 1946 Star Magazine cover
- Born: 24 October 1925; Smyrna, Turkey
- Died: 29 November 2007 (aged 82); Rome, Italy
- Other name: Yvette Da Todi
- Occupations: Actress, singer
- Years active: 1942–1947 (film)

Chiaretta Gelli (1925–2007) was an Italian singer and film actress. She was one of several young Italian actresses promoted as a star similar to the Hollywood-based Canadian Deanna Durbin.

== Selected filmography ==
- Departure at Seven (1946)
- Il birichino di papà (1946)
- Hotel Luna, Room 34 (1946)

== Bibliography ==
- Gundle, Stephen. Mussolini's Dream Factory: Film Stardom in Fascist Italy. Berghahn Books, 2013.
