= A Yank in Rome =

1946 film

- Directed by: Luigi Zampa
- Written by: Gino Castrignano; Aldo De Benedetti; Luigi Zampa
- Produced by: Gino Castrignano; Carlo Ponti
- Starring: Valentina Cortese
- Cinematography: Václav Vích
- Edited by: Eraldo Da Roma
- Music by: Nino Rota
- Release date: 1946
- Running time: 110 minutes
- Country: Italy
- Language: Italian

A Yank in Rome (Italian: Un americano in vacanza) is a 1946 Italian comedy film directed by Luigi Zampa and starring Valentina Cortese.

== Cast ==
- Valentina Cortese as Maria, La maestrina
- Andrea Checchi as Roberto
- Leo Dale as Dick
- Adolfo Celi as Tom
- Paolo Stoppa as Sor Augusto
- Elli Parvo as Elena
- Giovanni Dolfini as Don Giuseppe
- Felice Minotti as Il padre di Roberto
- Gino Baghetti as Monsignor Caligaris
- Anna Maria Padoan as La signorina Paolina
- Arturo Bragaglia as Il sacrestano
- Oreste Fares as Il portiere di casa Caligaris
- Luciano Salce as L'ufficiale americano
- Elettra Druscovich as La contessina Arcieri
- Achille Ponzi as Pietro, il cameriere
