= Mario Baffico =

Italian screenwriter and film director (1907–1972)

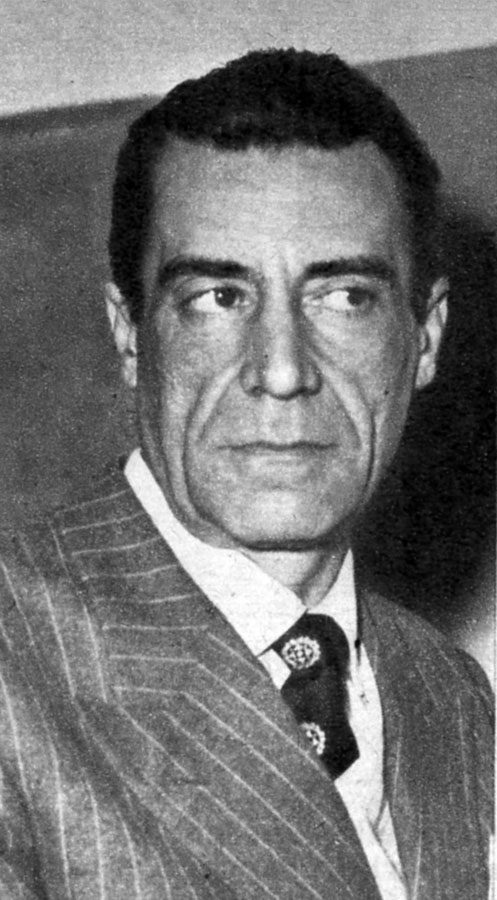
- Mario Baffico in 1962.
- Born: 5 February 1907; La Maddalena, Sardinia, Italy
- Died: 17 January 1972 (aged 64); Rome, Lazio, Italy
- Occupations: Screenwriter, Director
- Years active: 1932-1953

Mario Baffico (1907–1972) was an Italian screenwriter and film director.

== Selected filmography ==
- The Dance of Time (1936)
- No Man's Land (1939)
- Incanto di mezzanotte (1940)

== Bibliography ==
- Nina DaVinci Nichols. Pirandello and Film. University of Nebraska Press, 1995.
