= Mireille Granelli =

French actress

- Born: 1936 (age 89–90); Boulogne-Billancourt, France
- Occupation: Actress
- Years active: 1955–1968 (film)

Mireille Granelli is a retired French film actress.

== Selected filmography ==
- Beatrice Cenci (1956)
- Noi siamo le colonne (1956)
- Les Truands (1956)
- Forgive Us Our Trespasses (1956)
- Mimi Pinson (1958)
- Hercules, Prisoner of Evil (1964)
- Mission to Caracas (1965)
- A Taste of Death (1968)

== Bibliography ==
- Hughes, Howard. Cinema Italiano: The Complete Guide from Classics to Cult. I.B.Tauris, 2011.
