= Carlo Montuori =

Italian cinematographer

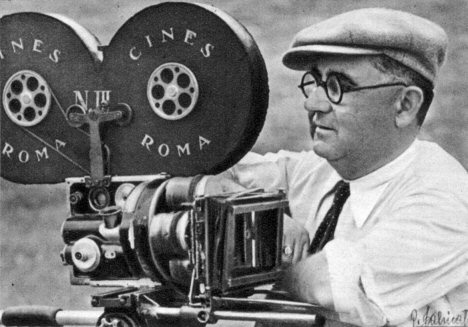
- Born: 3 August 1885; Casacalenda, Abruzzi e Molise, Italy
- Died: 4 March 1968 (aged 82); Rome, Lazio, Italy

Carlo Montuori (3 August 1885 – 4 March 1968) was an Italian cinematographer and cameraman.

Born in Casacalenda, near Campobasso, at twelve Montuori moved to Milan to live with his uncle, a photographer and a painter; in Milan he attended the Polytechnic University and followed courses in painting at the Brera Academy. He approached cinema in 1907 working in the production company "Comerio & C." and debuting as an operator in Dalla pietà all'amore, a 1909 Luca Comerio's documentary film about the 1908 Messina earthquake. At the same time Montuori started working at the photo studio Ganzini, where he learned the basics in the field of the use of artificial lighting. Starting from 1911 Montuori was among the first in Italy to test the application of these techniques in film, inventing a device based on rudimentary arc lamps, made of carbon bound with wire and connected to the electric current through resistors.

After collaborating with the Italian leading directors from the silent era such as Carmine Gallone and Augusto Genina, in 1925 he collaborated at the Fred Niblo's blockbuster Ben-Hur, and in 1929 he was the cinematographer of Sole, the directorial debut of Alessandro Blasetti, with whom he establishing a professional relationship that lasted for eight films.

After the war, Montuori "had a major role in the figurative culture of first neo-realism", often collaborating with Luigi Zampa and winning a silver ribbon for best cinematography for his work in Vittorio De Sica's Bicycle Thieves. His son Mario was also a cinematographer.

== Selected filmography ==
- Marco Visconti (1925)
- Goodbye Youth (1927)
- Miryam (1929)
- Sun (1929)
- Mother Earth (1931)
- The Man with the Claw (1931)
- The Paw (1931)
- The Table of the Poor (1932)
- The Blue Fleet (1932)
- Your Money or Your Life (1932)
- The Missing Treaty (1933)
- Seconda B (1934)
- The Last of the Bergeracs (1934)
- Unripe Fruit (1934)
- Stadium (1934)
- Golden Arrow (1935)
- Thirty Seconds of Love (1936)
- The Dance of Time (1936)
- The Ferocious Saladin (1937)
- Abandon All Hope (1937)
- For Men Only (1938)
- A Lady Did It (1938)
- Pride (1938)
- They've Kidnapped a Man (1938)
- Frenzy (1939)
- Goodbye Youth (1940)
- The Birth of Salome (1940)
- Love Trap (1940)
- Pirates of Malaya (1941)
- The Two Tigers (1941)
- Souls in Turmoil (1942)
- Sleeping Beauty (1942)
- The Countess of Castiglione (1942)
- Street of the Five Moons (1942)
- Yes, Madam (1942)
- Farewell Love! (1943)
- Departure at Seven (1946)
- The Courier of the King (1947)
- The White Primrose (1947)
- To Live in Peace (1947)
- Bicycle Thieves (1948)
- Prelude to Madness (1948)
- Alarm Bells (1949)
- Chains (1949)
- The Bread Peddler (1950)
- The Black Captain (1951)
- Rome-Paris-Rome (1951)
- Mamma Mia, What an Impression! (1951)
- Lieutenant Giorgio (1952)
- The Dream of Zorro (1952)
- The Enemy (1952)
- Passionate Song (1953)
- What Scoundrels Men Are! (1953)
- Via Padova 46 (1953)
- Count Max (1957)
