= Departure at Seven =

1946 film

- Film poster
- Directed by: Mario Mattoli
- Written by: Aldo De Benedetti; Mario Mattoli; Pietro Garinei; Sandro Giovannini
- Produced by: Dino De Laurentiis
- Starring: Chiaretta Gelli; Carlo Campanini; Laura Gore
- Cinematography: Carlo Montuori
- Edited by: Fernando Tropea
- Music by: Giovanni D'Anzi
- Production company: Lux Film
- Distributed by: Lux Film
- Release date: 1 June 1946
- Running time: 90 minutes
- Country: Italy
- Language: Italian

Departure at Seven (Italian: Partenza ore 7) is a 1946 Italian musical comedy film directed by Mario Mattoli and starring Chiaretta Gelli, Carlo Campanini and Laura Gore. The film's sets were designed by the art director Gastone Medin. It was shot at the Fert Studios in Turin.

== Cast ==
- Chiaretta Gelli as Chiaretta Fumagalli
- Carlo Campanini as Se stesso
- Alberto Rabagliati as Giorgio
- Laura Gore as Lucy D'Orsay
- Tino Scotti as Filippo
- Enzo Turco as Nicolino
- Nando Bruno as Brunetti
- Raimondo Vianello as Spettatore a teatro
- Maria Donati
- Paolo Bonecchi
- Egisto Olivieri
- Dino Peretti
- Galeazzo Benti

== Bibliography ==
- Carlo Celli & Marga Cottino-Jones. A New Guide to Italian Cinema. Springer, 2007.
