= Carlo Campanini =

Italian actor (1906–1984)

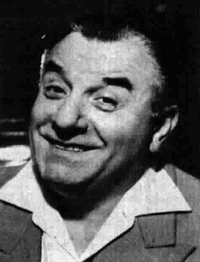
- Born: 5 October 1906; Turin, Kingdom of Italy
- Died: 20 November 1984 (aged 78); Rome, Italy
- Occupation: Actor
- Years active: 1939–1969

Carlo Campanini (5 October 1906 – 20 November 1984) was an Italian actor, singer and comedian. He appeared in more than 120 films between 1939 and 1969.

== Life and career ==
Born in Turin, Campanini attended a technical school and a course of singing, then he started his career at nineteen entering the company of prose Casaleggio, with whom he toured six months in Argentina. In the following years Campanini was cast as singer-comedian and even as a tenor in a number of revue and operetta companies. In 1936 he became the leading actor in the company of Vivienne D'Arys, in which he successfully teamed with Carlo Dapporto. He made his film debut in 1939, in Lo vedi come sei... lo vedi come sei? alongside Macario, then he soon became a very usual presence in comedy films, in roles of sidekick or as a character actor. In 1945 he had his only film leading role, in the critically appreciated Mario Soldati's drama His Young Wife. Since 1950, starting from the comedy play Sogno di un Walter, he became the usual sidekick of Walter Chiari on stage, TV and films.

In 1945, Campanini was initiated in the regular Scottish Rite Masonic Lodge Fulgor Ortis in Rome, affiliated to the Grand Orient of Italy. Its Grand Master was the prince and actor Antonio De Curtis.

Some years later, he was converted to the Roman Catholic faith by Padre Pio of Pietralcina and according to then canon law, he left Freemasonry.

== Selected filmography ==
- Dora Nelson (1939)
- Lo vedi come sei... lo vedi come sei? (1939)
- Goodbye Youth (1940)
- La zia smemorata (1940)
- The Adventuress from the Floor Above (1941)
- The Actor Who Disappeared (1941)
- Light in the Darkness (1941)
- Schoolgirl Diary (1941)
- Thrill (1941)
- Honeymoon (1941)
- I Live as I Please (1942)
- Violets in Their Hair (1942)
- Invisible Chains (1942)
- Love Story (1942)
- The Lady Is Fickle (1942)
- Once a Week (1942)
- Sealed Lips (1942)
- Music on the Run (1943)
- Lively Teresa (1943)
- Life Is Beautiful (1943)
- Anything for a Song (1943)
- Two Suffer Better Than One (1943)
- The Za-Bum Circus (1944)
- His Young Wife (1945)
- The Ten Commandments (1945)
- Romulus and the Sabines (1945)
- Departure at Seven (1946)
- The Models of Margutta (1946)
- How I Lost the War (1947)
- Bullet for Stefano (1947)
- The White Primrose (1947)
- The Two Orphans (1947)
- Christmas at Camp 119 (1948)
- Mad About Opera (1948)
- Eleven Men and a Ball (1948)
- The Flame That Will Not Die (1949)
- A Night of Fame (1949)
- The Elusive Twelve (1950)
- The Cadets of Gascony (1950)
- The Transporter (1950)
- Seven Hours of Trouble (1951)
- Toto the Third Man (1951)
- Briscola (1951)
- The Steamship Owner (1951)
- My Heart Sings (1951)
- Sardinian Vendetta (1952)
- Poppy (1952)
- If You Won a Hundred Million (1953)
- It Was She Who Wanted It! (1953)
- Neapolitan Turk (1953)
- The Enchanting Enemy (1953)
- Milanese in Naples (1954)
- Public Opinion (1954)
- Les Hussards (1955)
- Sins of Casanova (1955)
- I giorni più belli (1956)
- L'amore nasce a Roma (1958)
- Non perdiamo la testa (1959)
- Obiettivo ragazze (1963)
- The Betrothed (1964)
