= A Crime of One's Own =

1967 novel

- First edition
- Author: Edward Grierson
- Cover artist: Ionicus
- Language: English
- Genre: Crime
- Publisher: Chatto and Windus
- Publication date: 1967
- Publication place: United Kingdom
- Media type: Print

A Crime of One's Own is a 1967 crime novel by the British writer Edward Grierson.

== Synopsis ==
The owner of a bookshop in provincial England with a fertile imagination. He becomes convinced that one of his customers is operating as part of an enemy spy ring. He follows her home, but when she is founded murdered with a paper knife from his office, he is arrested and put on trial for the crime.

== Bibliography ==
- Reilly, John M. Twentieth Century Crime & Mystery Writers. Springer, 2015.
- White, Terry. Justice Denoted: The Legal Thriller in American, British, and Continental Courtroom Literature. Praeger, 2003.
