= John W. V. Cordice =

American physician (1919–2013)

John Walter Vincent Cordice, Jr. (June 16, 1919 – December 29, 2013) was an American doctor and surgeon who is most notable for operating on Martin Luther King Jr. to save his life after a 1958 assassination attempt.

== Early life ==
Cordice was born on June 16, 1919 in Durham, North Carolina. He moved to New York in order to study at NYU for undergrad and New York University School of Medicine. His father, also a doctor, practiced at Lincoln Hospital in North Carolina. The elder Cordice was born in St. Vincent, West Indies and died in 1958.

== Medical career ==
Cordice joined the Army in 1943 and served as the official physician for the Tuskegee Airmen. While in the Army, he spent a year in France, where he assisted in that country's first open heart surgery. Cordice worked at Harlem Hospital for forty years, rising to the position of chief of thoracic surgery.

On September 20, 1958, Martin Luther King Jr. was attacked with a paper knife by Izola Curry. Cordice, along with doctors Aubre Maynard, Farrow Allen and Emil Naclerio, were called in to operate. Cordice mapped out a strategy which successfully saved King's life. He was the subject of the book When Harlem Nearly Killed King: The 1958 Stabbing of Dr. Martin Luther King, by Hugh Pearson.

== Private life ==
Cordice resided in Harlem and later Queens. On December 29, 2013, he died of natural causes at the age of 95, in Iowa.
