= Emil Naclerio =

American physician (1915–1985)

Emil A. Naclerio (March 21, 1915 – October 14, 1985) was an American doctor and surgeon who is most notable for operating on Dr. Martin Luther King Jr. to save his life after a 1958 assassination attempt.

== Attempted assassination of MLK ==
Izola Curry stabbed the reverend Martin Luther King Jr. in the chest with a letter opener on September 20, 1958, at book-signing in a Harlem department store. NYPD police officers Al Howard and Phil Romano took King in the chair down to an ambulance that took King to Harlem Hospital, and its top team of trauma surgeons, Dr. John W. V. Cordice, Jr., Dr. Emil Naclerio, Farrow Allen, and Aubré de Lambert Maynard were called in to operate. Emil Naclerio had been attending a wedding and arrived still in a tuxedo. They made incisions and inserted a rib spreader, making King’s aorta visible. Chief of Surgery Maynard then entered and attempted to pull out the letter opener, but cut his glove on the blade; a surgical clamp was finally used to pull out the blade. Cordice mapped out a strategy and successfully saved Dr. King. He was the subject of the book When Harlem Nearly Killed King: The 1958 Stabbing of Dr. Martin Luther King, by Hugh Pearson.

== Personal life ==
His son, Ron Naclerio is an author and all time winningest coach for the PSAL league.
