= Paper knife =

Tool used to open sealed envelopes

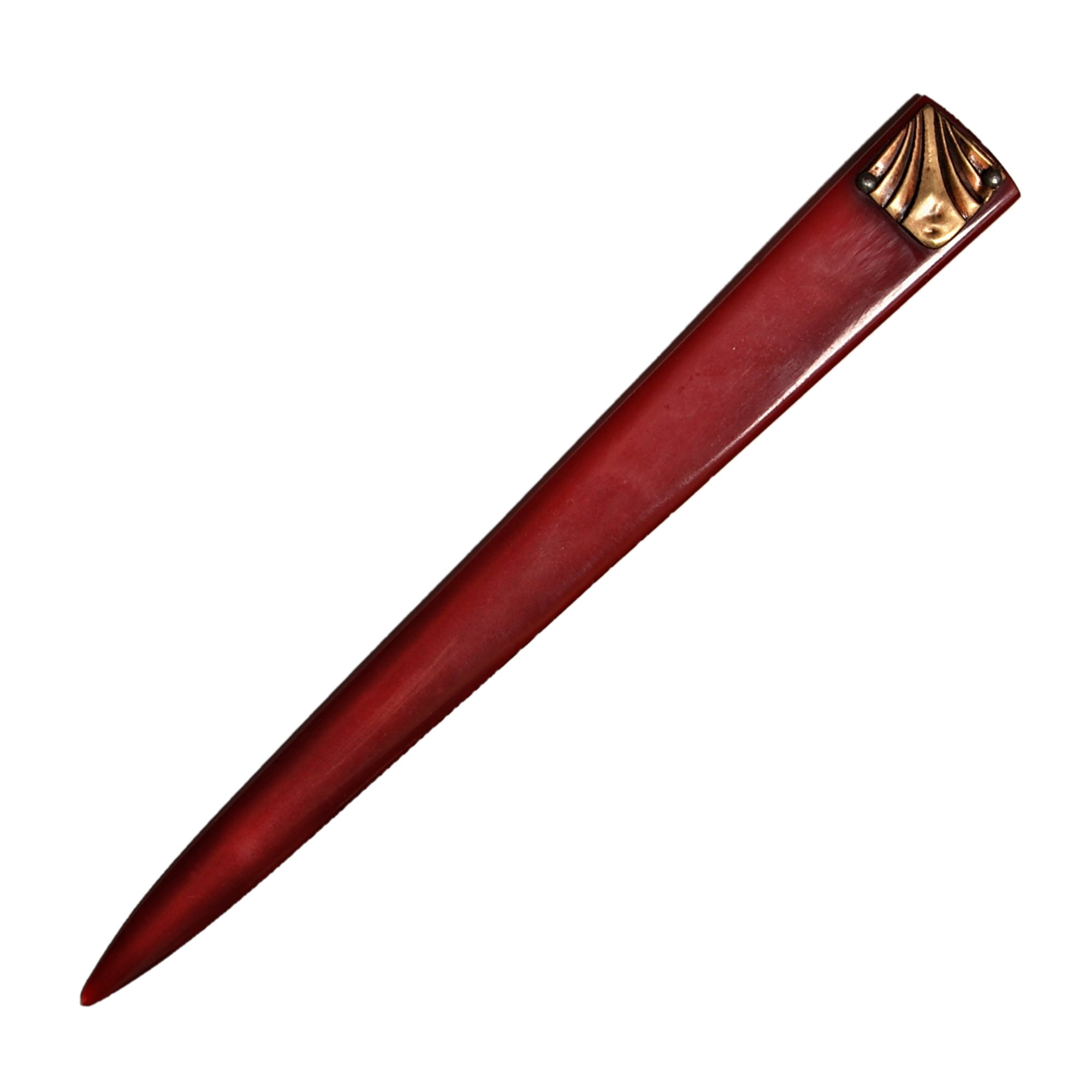
Bakelite letter opener

The terms paper knife and letter opener are often used interchangeably to refer to a knife-like desktop tool. In truth, they are actually for different functions and were in use at different times.

Paper knives are used for cutting open the pages of hand-produced books where the folding of printed sheets creates some closed edges that require severing of the paper before reading. Letter openers "evolved" from paper knives into longer, blunter blades for the sole purpose of opening envelopes. Paper knives are no longer in common use, except perhaps by antiques enthusiasts.

An electric version of a letter opener is also available, which uses motors to slide the envelopes across a blade, and is also able to handle increased numbers of envelopes, but the blade can slice into the contents of the envelope and damage them.

Letter openers may be designed from wood, metals, such as stainless steel, silver, or pewter, plastic, ivory, or a combination of materials. Often the style of the handle is embellished or styled more so than the blade. Some modern openers have a retractable razor blade inside a plastic handle.

== Patrick Henry's paper knife ==
American politician and Founding Father Patrick Henry is famous for making a speech before the Virginia House of Burgesses on March 23, 1775, stating the famous words "Give me Liberty or give me Death!" After this, he pretended to plunge a paper knife into his chest.

== Weapon in attempted assassination ==
On September 20, 1958, Izola Curry stabbed Martin Luther King Jr. in the chest with a letter opener at a book-signing in a Harlem department store. Correctly noting that the opener entered above King's heart (later proven to be within centimeters of his aorta), NYPD police officers Al Howard and Phil Romano took King in his chair down to an ambulance that took King to Harlem Hospital, where he was treated by the hospital's trauma surgeons, Dr. John W. V. Cordice, Jr. and Dr. Emil Naclerio. At one point, Chief of Surgery Aubre de Lambert Maynard entered and attempted to remove the letter opener from King's chest, but cut his glove on the blade; a surgical clamp was needed to remove it.

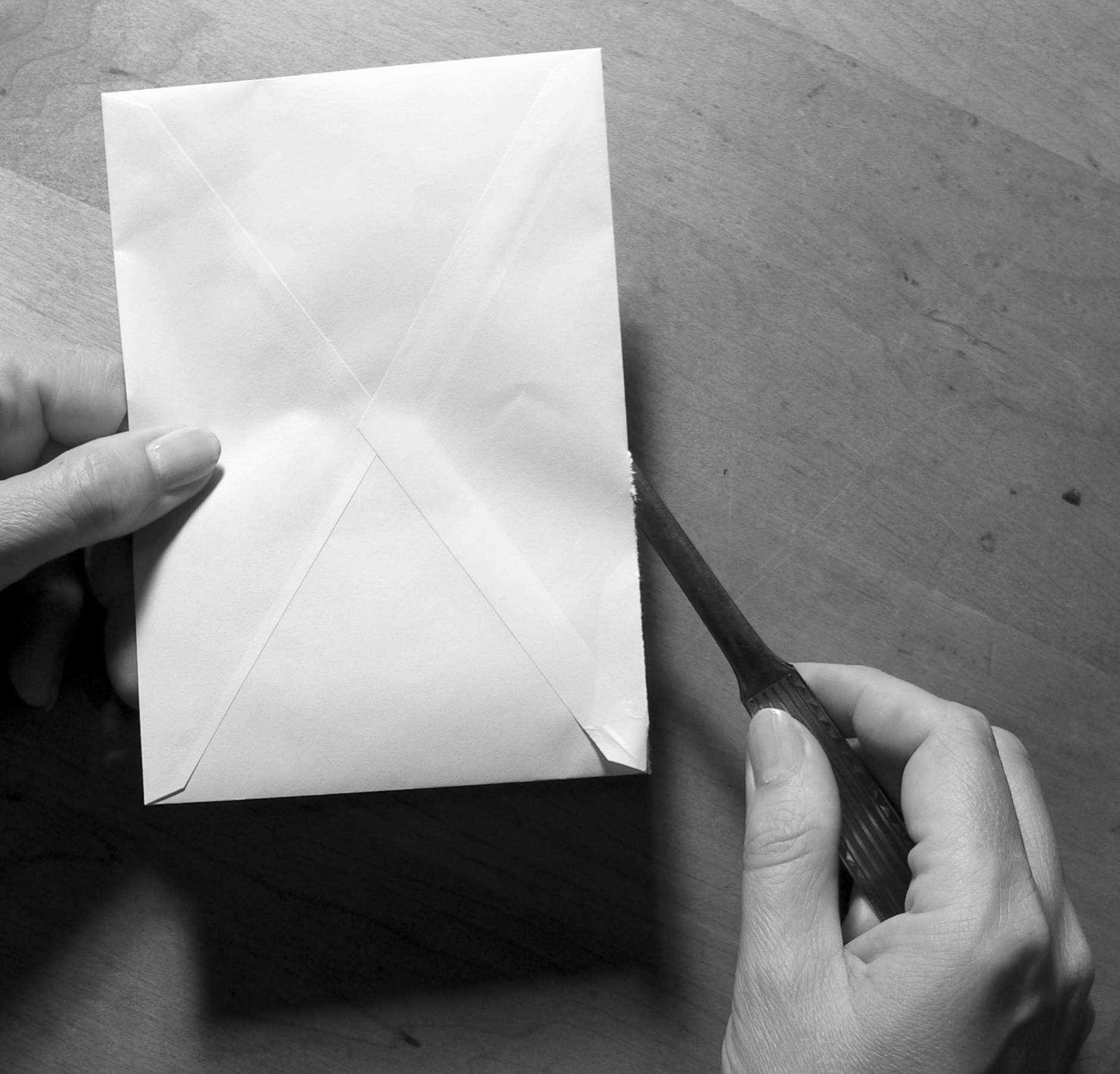
Opening a letter

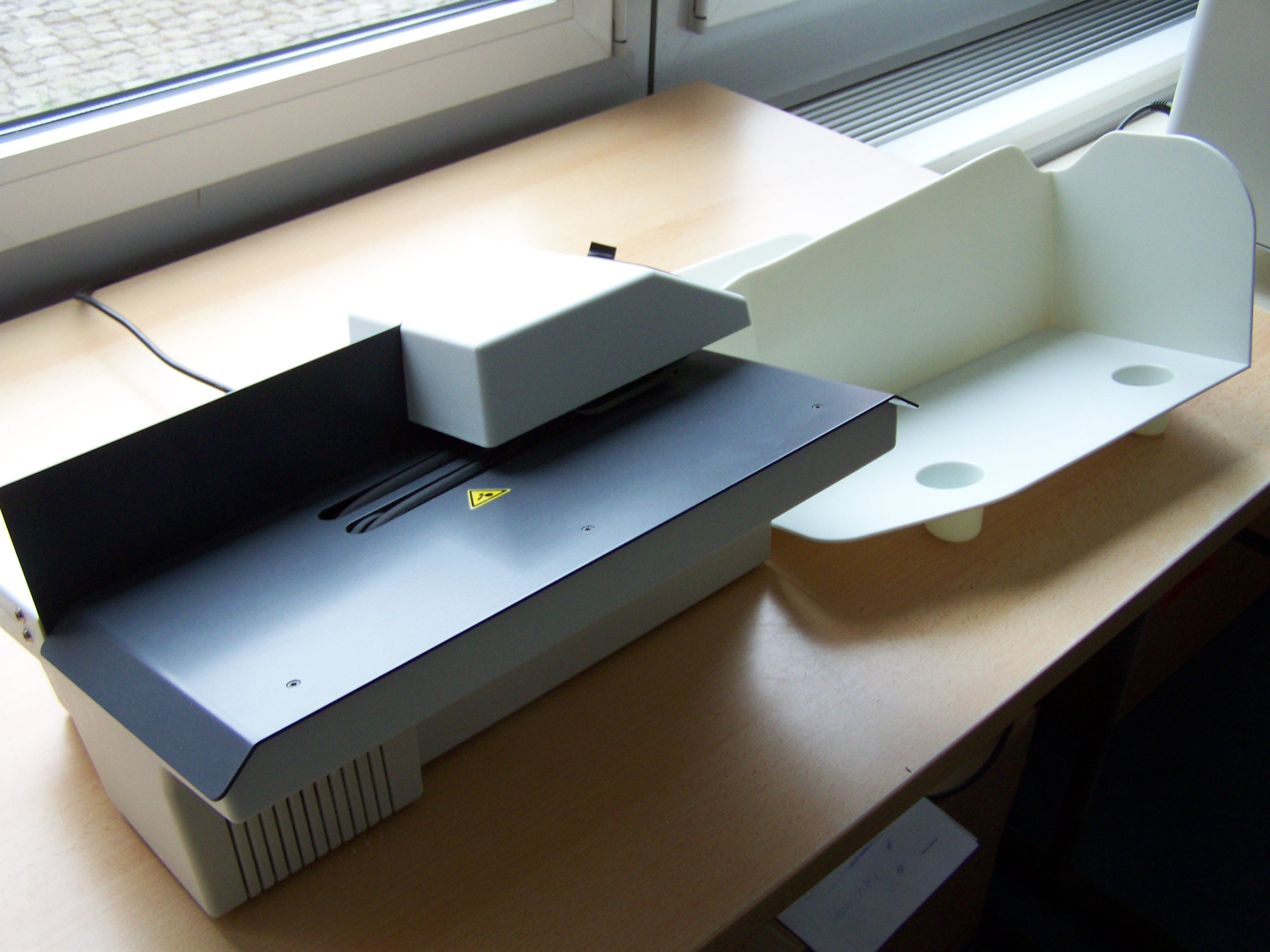
Electric letter opener

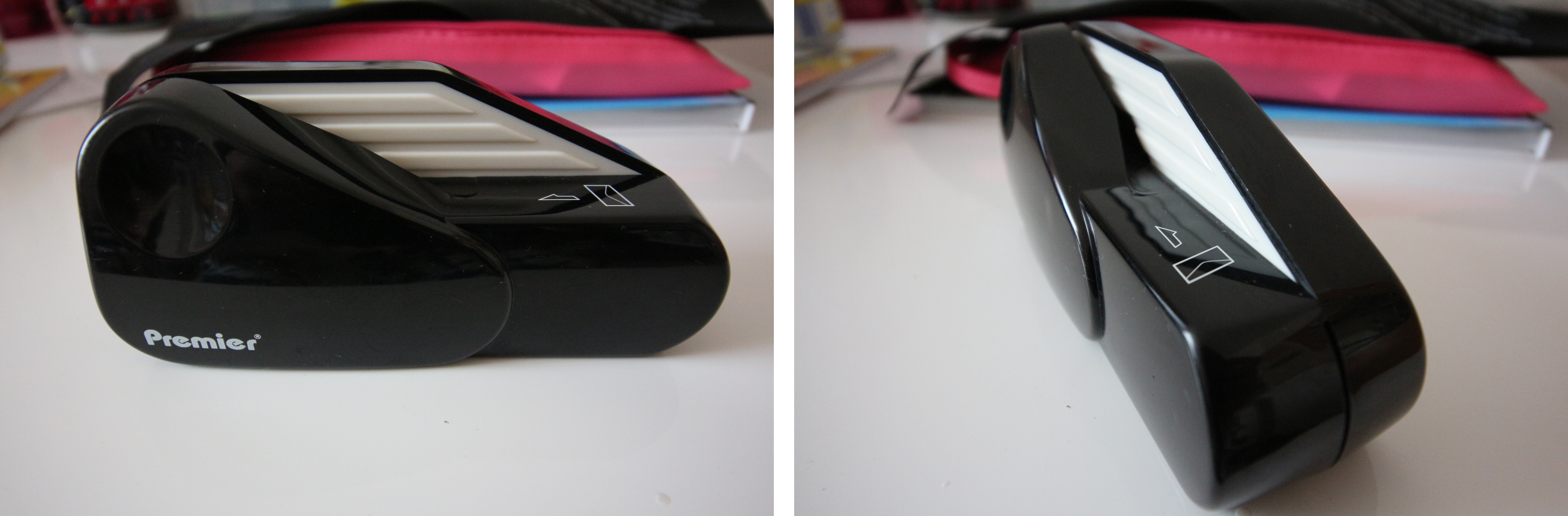
Electric letter opener Premier 1624 (Martin Yale Industries)

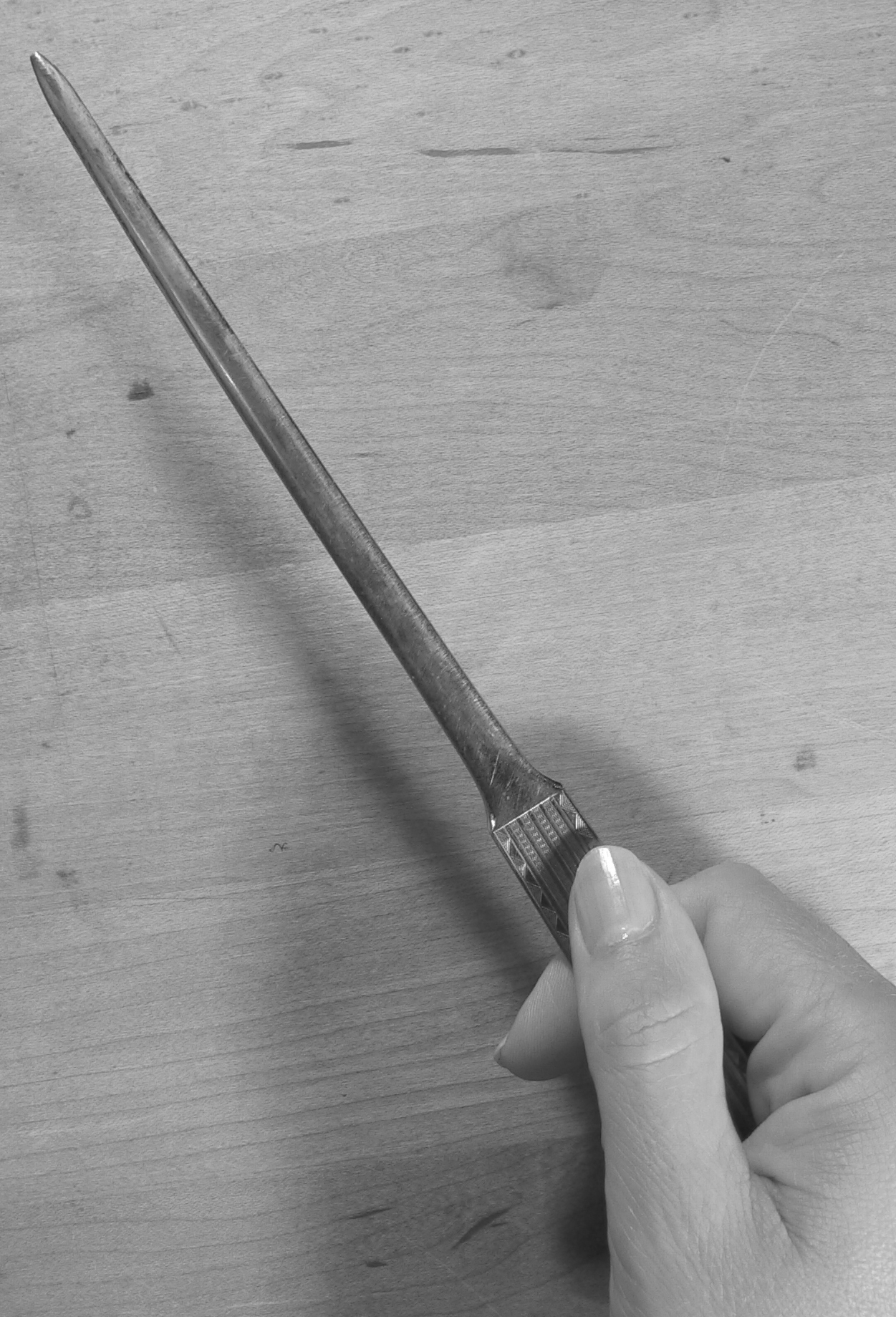
Conventional letter opener

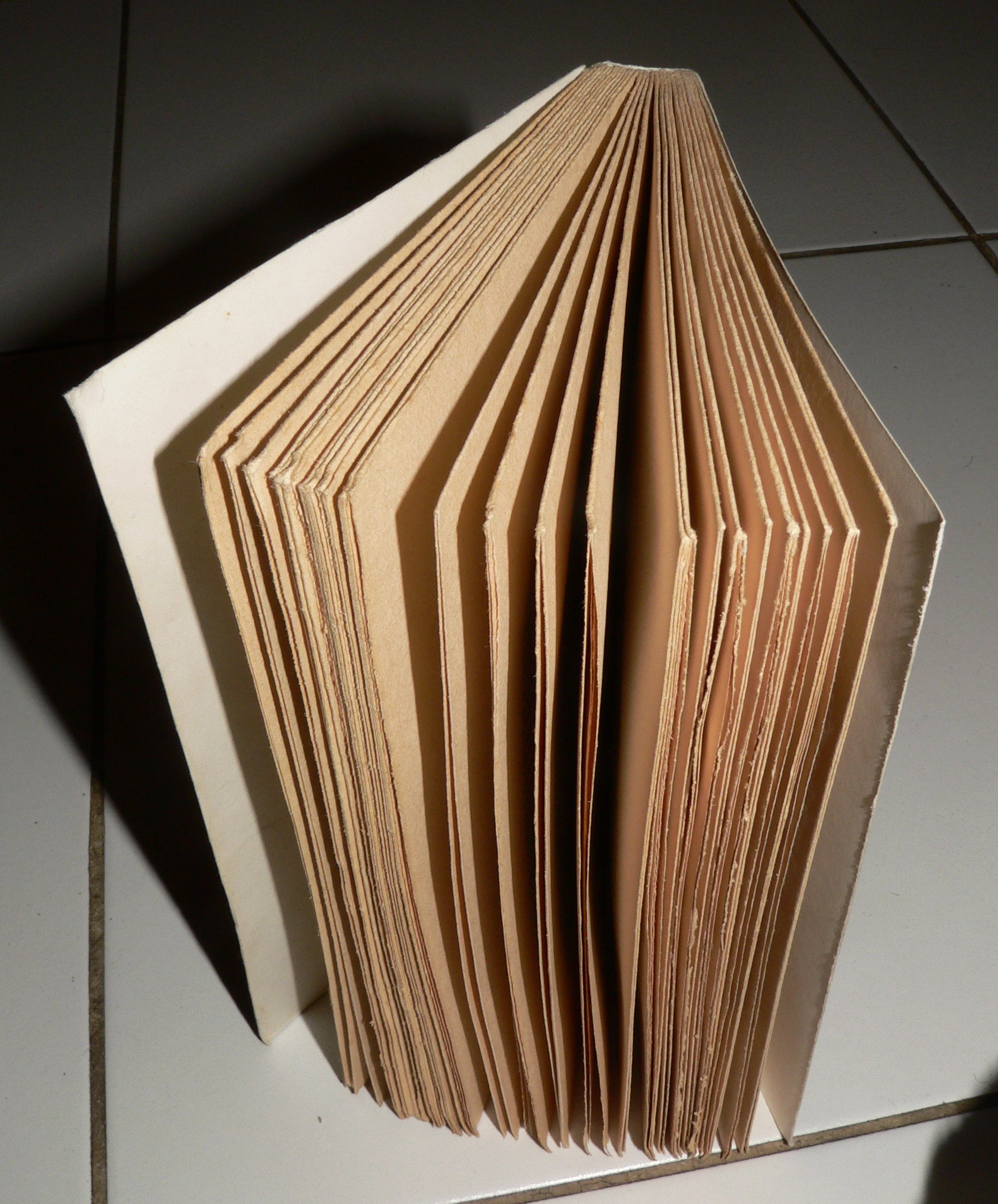
Unopened book pages, to be cut with a paper knife
