= The Massingham Affair (TV series) =

British television series

- Genre: Crime drama
- Based on: The Massingham Affair by Edward Grierson
- Written by: Rex Tucker
- Directed by: Paddy Russell
- Starring: Lyndon Brook; Andrew Keir; Eileen Atkins
- Country of origin: United Kingdom
- Original language: English
- No. of series: 1
- No. of episodes: 6

Production
- Producer: Paddy Russell
- Running time: 30 minutes

Original release
- Network: BBC 2
- Release: 12 September – 17 October 1964

The Massingham Affair is a British period crime television series which originally aired on BBC 2 in six episodes from 12 September to 17 October 1964. It is an adaptation of the 1962 novel of the same title by Edward Grierson. Unlike many BBC series of this era, it is believed all six episodes survive intact, but remain unreleased since their original broadcast.

== Synopsis ==
In the late nineteenth century, the violent robbery of a vicar and his daughter leads to two men being convicted and sentenced to life imprisonment. However, a young solicitor Justin Derry is unconvinced of the verdict and sets out to exonerate them.

== Cast ==
- Lyndon Brook as Justin Derry
- Andrew Keir as Superintendent Blair
- Renny Lister as Jean Kelly
- Eileen Atkins as Charlotte Verney
- George Cormack as Reverend Verney
- Geoffrey Bayldon as Mr. Lumley
- Bernard Kay as Jim Longford
- Robert Cawdron as PC Hugh
- Patsy Rowlands as Georgina Deverel
- Barry Wilsher as Mick Kelly
- John Wentworth as Colonel Deverel
- Norman Rodway as Mr. Gilmore
- John Barrett as George Sugden
- John Cazabon as Mr. Harris
- George Little as Pat Milligan
- Harry Littlewood as Joe Henderson
- Cynthia Etherington as Mrs. Sugden
- William Mervyn as Mr. Jessop
- Frieda Knorr as Amy Dodds
- John Rae as The Judge
- Mary Webster as Maggie Binns
- William Gordon as Court Usher
- Joby Blanshard as PC Luke
- John Wilding as Warder
- Gladys Dawson as Grannie Binns
- Benn Simons as PC Moffatt
- Robert Gregory as Urchin
- Elizabeth Digby-Smith as Lucy
- Morris Parsons as A Man
- Erik Chitty as Mr. Rees
- Ronald Adam as Mr. Paget
- Philip Howard as Mr. Fortescue
- A.J. Brown as Judge
- Denis Cleary as Servant
- George Betton as Clerk of the Court
- Ian Cunningham as Foreman of the Jury

== Bibliography ==
- Baskin, Ellen . Serials on British Television, 1950–1994. Scolar Press, 1996.
