= The Massingham Affair =

1962 novel

- First edition (US)
- Author: Edward Grierson
- Language: English
- Genre: Crime
- Publisher: Chatto and Windus (UK); Doubleday (US)
- Publication date: 1962
- Publication place: United Kingdom
- Media type: Print

The Massingham Affair is a 1962 crime detective novel by the British writer Edward Grierson. Grierson based on the story on a real-life case that took place in Edlingham. in the late nineteenth century.

== Synopsis ==
Many years before an elderly vicar and his daughter were the victims of a violent robbery. Two local men were arrested and sentenced to life imprisonment for the crime. Now, Justin Derry, working as a solicitor in the village decides to reopen the case and exonerate the accused, despite the hostility that ensues from the villagers.

== TV adaptation ==
In 1964 it was made into a television series of the same title, broadcast on BBC Two. The cast included Lyndon Brook, Andrew Keir, Eileen Atkins and Renny Lister.

== Bibliography ==
- Baskin, Ellen. Serials on British Television, 1950–1994. Scolar Press, 1996.
- Reilly, John M. Twentieth Century Crime & Mystery Writers. Springer, 2015.
- White, Terry. Justice Denoted: The Legal Thriller in American, British, and Continental Courtroom Literature. Praeger, 2003.
