= Reputation for a Song =

1952 novel

- First edition
- Author: Edward Grierson
- Language: English
- Genre: Crime
- Publisher: Chatto and Windus
- Publication date: 1952
- Publication place: United Kingdom
- Media type: Print

Reputation for a Song is a 1952 crime novel by the British writer Edward Grierson. It is an inverted detective story, breaking with many of the traditions of the established Golden Age of Detective Fiction. A young man is placed on trial accused of murdering his father. Its conclusion rests on interpretations of the presumption of innocence.

== Film adaptation ==
In 1970 it was adapted into the film My Lover, My Son directed by John Newland and starring Romy Schneider, Dennis Waterman and Patricia Brake.

== Bibliography ==
- Enser, A.G.S. Filmed Books and Plays: A List of Books and Plays from which Films Have Been Made, 1928-1974, Volume 1. Simon & Schuster, 1975.
- Hilfer, Tony. The Crime Novel: A Deviant Genre. University of Texas Press, 2014.
- Reilly, John M. Twentieth Century Crime & Mystery Writers. Springer, 2015.
- White, Terry. Justice Denoted: The Legal Thriller in American, British, and Continental Courtroom Literature. Praeger, 2003.
