= The Second Man =

1956 novel by Edward Grierson

- First edition
- Author: Edward Grierson
- Language: English
- Genre: Crime
- Publisher: Chatto and Windus
- Publication date: 1956
- Publication place: United Kingdom
- Media type: Print

The Second Man is a 1956 crime novel by the British writer Edward Grierson. It won the Gold Dagger award of the Crime Writers' Association.

== Synopsis ==
A new female barrister Marion Kerrison defends a man accused of murdering his aunt to get his hands of her jewels.

== Adaptations ==
It was adapted for a 1959 episode of the American television series Playhouse 90 that starred James Mason, Diana Wynyard, Margaret Leighton and Hugh Griffith.

Another adaptation was as an episode of the British television series ITV Play of the Week under the title A Man Involved (1959).

A West German TV film directed by Peter Zadek had the title Die Dame in der schwarzen Robe (1960).

== Bibliography ==
- Reilly, John M. Twentieth Century Crime & Mystery Writers. Springer, 2015.
- Roberts, Jerry. Encyclopedia of Television Film Directors. Scarecrow Press, 2009.
- White, Terry. Justice Denoted: The Legal Thriller in American, British, and Continental Courtroom Literature. Praeger, 2003.
