= Aubré de Lambert Maynard =

American surgeon

Aubré de Lambert Maynard (November 17, 1901 – March 20, 1999) was an American physician and surgeon who is most notable for operating on Dr. Martin Luther King Jr. to save his life after a 1958 assassination attempt. Maynard was an authority on chest and abdominal wounds.

== Personal life ==
Maynard was born in Georgetown, Guyana and migrated to the United States in 1906. He initially attended City College of New York in 1922 and later enrolled in New York University Medical School. He was told that engineering had no prospects for blacks and chose medical school. Maynard had difficulties finding employment in the medical field. After finishing first on the internship examination, he was hired as the first black intern at Harlem Hospital. He lived in lower Manhattan. In 1928, he married Ethel Maynard with whom he had one daughter. The couple divorced in 1930. In 1978, he wrote the book Surgeons to the Poor: The Harlem Hospital Story.

== Medical career ==
He served as the Director of Surgery at Harlem Hospital. He also saved the life of W. Averell Harriman.

== Operation on Martin Luther King ==
Izola Curry stabbed the reverend Martin Luther King Jr. in the chest with a letter opener on September 20, 1958, at book-signing in a Harlem department store. NYPD police officers Al Howard and Phil Romano took King in the chair down to an ambulance that took King to Harlem Hospital, and its top team of trauma surgeons, Dr. John W. V. Cordice Jr., Dr. Emil Naclerio, Aubre C. Maynard, and Farrow Allen were called in to operate. They made incisions and inserted a rib spreader, making King’s aorta visible. Chief of Surgery Aubre de Lambert Maynard then entered and attempted to pull out the letter opener, but cut his glove on the blade; a surgical clamp was finally used to pull out the blade. Cordice mapped out a strategy and successfully saved Dr. King. He was the subject of the book When Harlem Nearly Killed King: The 1958 Stabbing of Dr. Martin Luther King, by Hugh Pearson.
