= Al Howard =

American police officer and night club owner (1927–2020)

- Born: 1927
- Died: 2020 (aged 92–93); Las Vegas, Nevada
- Occupations: Police officer, night club owner

Al Howard was an American police officer and nightclub owner. After a career as a New York City Police Department detective, he purchased and owned Showman’s Jazz Club.

During his career as a detective he was part of the team that apprehended David Berkowitz, the serial killer known as the "Son of Sam". Howard appeared as himself in the 2017 documentary about capturing Berkowitz.

In 1958, when he was a patrolman, he responded to a stabbing at a book-signing, and his quick thinking played a key role in saving Martin Luther King Jr.'s life. King was signing his first book when a woman, Izola Curry, stabbed him with a letter opener. When Howard and his partner, Phil Romano, arrived on scene he found a well meaning witness was about to try to remove the knife from the wound. Howard realized that this could be dangerous, and directed her to stop. He advised King to try to remain still, and try not to cough - advice that doctors later confirmed was highly significant, as the knife was right next to King's aorta. If the knife had nicked King's aorta he would have immediately bled out.

Howard then duped the crowd that had gathered, telling them to clear a line to the front door. He then went outside, as if he were waiting for the ambulance, which caused the crowd to follow him. Howard realized that the crowd would delay taking King to a nearby hospital, so he arranged for the ambulance to come to the rear of the building, where Romano and assistants had quietly taken King.

Howard died of COVID-19 while visiting Las Vegas, Nevada in October 2020.
