= My Lover, My Son =

1970 film by John Newland

- Directed by: John Newland
- Written by: Jenni Hall; William Marchant; Wilbur Stark
- Based on: Reputation for a Song by Edward Grierson
- Produced by: Wilbur Stark
- Starring: Romy Schneider; Dennis Waterman
- Cinematography: David Muir
- Edited by: Peter Musgrave
- Music by: Norrie Paramor; Mike Vickers
- Distributed by: Metro-Goldwyn-Mayer
- Release date: May 13, 1970
- Running time: 96 minutes
- Countries: United States; United Kingdom
- Language: English

My Lover, My Son (also known as Hush-a-bye Murder) is a 1970 American-British co-production drama film directed by John Newland and starring Romy Schneider, Donald Houston and Dennis Waterman.

It tells the story of a mother clinging to her maturing son. The film is based on Edward Grierson's 1952 novel Reputation for a Song.

== Plot ==
Francesca Anderson leads an unhappy marriage with her husband Robert. Her real attention is dedicated to her son James, who reminds her of her late lover Macer. Francesca is the only one who knows that James is not Robert's, but Macer's son. So Francesca reacts jealously when James falls in love with a girlfriend, Julie.

James intervenes in an argument between his parents and kills Robert. During James' trial, Francesca gives the crucial testimony in favour of her son, who is found not guilty. To Francesca's discomfort, James escapes his mother's clinging and decides to stay with Julie.

== Cast ==
- Romy Schneider as Francesca Anderson
- Donald Houston as Robert
- Dennis Waterman as James Anderson
- Patricia Brake as Julie
- Peter Sallis as Sir Sidney Brent
- William Dexter as Parks
- Alexandra Bastedo as Cicely Clarkson
- Mark Hawkins as Macer/Francesca's lover
- Maggie Wright as prostitute
- Janet Brown as Mrs. Woods
- Tom Chatto as Mr. Woods
- Michael Forest as Detective Inspector Chidley
- Peter Gilmore as barman
- Rosalie Horner as receptionist
- Arthur Howard as judge
- Chrissie Shrimpton as Kenworthy's girlfriend
- David Warbeck as Kenworthy
- Robert Wilde as Park's assistant
- Cleo Sylvestre as dressmaker
- Paul Dawkins as foreman of the jury

== Critical reception ==
The Monthly Film Bulletin wrote: "Television director John Newland brings a surface professionalism to his first feature and makes good use of cameraman David Muir's feeling for richly textured interiors. But though Romy Schneider makes up for what she lacks in credibility as a possessive mother with what in the circumstances is an admirably controlled performance, and Dennis Waterman just manages to keep his part together, they can't really do much with a script which is just another variation on a hackneyed theme, this time with a twist in the tail and a televisual gesture towards courtroom suspense thrown in for good measure. The dialogue is inane throughout, ... there is a theme song which recurs with the unfailing regularity of a commercial break, and the camera intermittently indulges flights of fancy to represent interior torment."

Variety wrote: "A potentially gripping psychodrama about an attractive young mother's neurotic, suggestively incestuous passion for her adolescent son is unevenly directed by John Newland and miscast with Romy Schneider as the mother. The result is a visually-creative dramatic mishmash with dull boxoffice prospects."

== See also ==
- List of American films of 1970
