= Adrian, Georgia =

- City
- Location in Emanuel County, Georgia
- Coordinates: 32°31′55″N 82°35′26″W
- Country: United States
- State: Georgia
- Counties: Johnson; Emanuel

Area
  - Total: 1.42 sq mi (3.68 km^{2})
  - Land: 1.37 sq mi (3.56 km^{2})
  - Water: 0.042 sq mi (0.11 km^{2})
- Elevation: 286 ft (87 m)

Population (2020)
  - Total: 552
  - Density: 401.5/sq mi (155.02/km^{2})
- Time zone: UTC-5 (Eastern (EST))
  - Summer (DST): UTC-4 (EDT)
- ZIP code: 31002
- Area code: 478
- FIPS code: 13-00660
- GNIS feature ID: 0310411
- Website: www.cityofadrian.org

Adrian is a city in Emanuel and Johnson County, Georgia, United States. As of the 2020 census, the city had a population of 552.

== History ==
A post office has been in operation at Adrian since 1891. Adrian was incorporated in 1899. It is unknown why the name "Adrian" was applied to this community.

== Geography ==
Adrian is located at the intersection of U.S. Route 80/Georgia State Route 26 with State Routes 15/78.

According to the United States Census Bureau, Adrian has a total area of 1.4 square miles (3.7 km^{2}), of which 1.4 square miles (3.6 km^{2}) is land and 0.04 square miles (0.1 km^{2}), or 3.12%, is water.

== Demographics ==
Historical population
Census	Pop.	Note	%±
1900	833		—
1910	816		−2.0%
1920	740		−9.3%
1930	685		−7.4%
1940	580		−15.3%
1950	503		−13.3%
1960	568		12.9%
1970	705		24.1%
1980	756		7.2%
1990	615		−18.7%
2000	579		−5.9%
2010	664		14.7%
2020	552		−16.9%
U.S. Decennial Census; 1850-1870 1880; 1890-1910 1920-1930; 1930-1940 1940-1950; 1960-1980 1980-2000

=== Racial and ethnic composition ===
Adrian city, Georgia – Racial and ethnic composition Note: the US Census treats Hispanic/Latino as an ethnic category. This table excludes Latinos from the racial categories and assigns them to a separate category. Hispanics/Latinos may be of any race.
Race / Ethnicity (NH = Non-Hispanic)	Pop 2000	Pop 2010	Pop 2020	% 2000	% 2010	% 2020
White alone (NH)	398	404	356	68.74%	60.84%	64.49%
Black or African American alone (NH)	176	213	164	30.40%	32.08%	29.71%
Native American or Alaska Native alone (NH)	1	0	7	0.17%	0.00%	1.27%
Asian alone (NH)	0	2	2	0.00%	0.30%	0.36%
Native Hawaiian or Pacific Islander alone (NH)	0	0	0	0.00%	0.00%	0.00%
Other race alone (NH)	0	1	0	0.00%	0.15%	0.00%
Mixed race or Multiracial (NH)	0	11	11	0.00%	1.66%	1.99%
Hispanic or Latino (any race)	4	33	12	0.69%	4.97%	2.17%
Total	579	664	552	100.00%	100.00%	100.00%

=== 2020 census ===
As of 2020, its population was 552.

== Notable people ==
- Izola Curry – Assailant who tried to kill Martin Luther King Jr. in 1958
