= Edward Grierson =

British writer (1914–1975)

- Born: 9 March 1914; Bedford
- Died: 24 May 1975 (aged 61)
- Citizenship: United Kingdom
- Education: Exeter College, Oxford (B.A., honors)
- Occupations: Barrister, Justice of the Peace
- Spouse: Helen D. Henderson (m. 1938)
- Writing career
- Language: English
- Years active: 1949–1975
- Genres: Crime fiction; history
- Notable awards: Gold Dagger Award, 1956

Edward Grierson (9 March 1914 – 24 May 1975) was a Northumberland barrister and a writer of crime novels. His debut crime novel is the outstanding Reputation for a Song, a classic inverted detective story. Grierson also wrote five novels, six works of non-fiction and two plays. He also wrote as Brian Crowther and John P. Stevenson.

== Works ==
=== Crime novels ===
- Shall Perish with the Sword (as Brian Crowther). London, Quality Press, 1949.
- Reputation for a Song. London, Chatto and Windus, and New York, Knopf, 1952. See also the film My Lover, My Son
- The Second Man. London, Chatto and Windus, and New York, Knopf, 1956. Gold Dagger Award (dramatised on television: 'The Second Man' on Playhouse 90 in 1959 - starred James Mason and Diana Wynyard)
- The Massingham Affair. London, Chatto and Windus, 1962; New York, Doubleday, 1963.
- A Crime of One's Own. London, Chatto and Windus, and New York, Putnam, 1967.

=== Novels ===
- The Lilies and the Bees. London, Chatto and Windus, 1953; as The Hastening Wind, New York, Knopf, 1953; as The Royalist, New York, Bantam, 1956.
- Far Morning. London, Chatto and Windus, and New York, Knopf, 1955.
- The Captain General (as John P. Stevenson). New York, Doubleday, 1956; (as Edward Grierson), London, Chatto and Windus, 1958.
- Dark Torrent of Glencoe. New York, Doubleday, 1960; London, Chatto and Windus, 1961.

=== Plays ===
- His Mother's Son, with Raymond Lulham (produced Harrogate, Yorkshire, 1953).
- Radio plays: The Ninth Legion, 1956; The Second Man, 1956; Mr. Curtis's Chambers, 1959.

=== Other ===
- Storm Bird: The Strange Life of Georgina Weldon. London, Chatto and Windus, 1959.
- The Fatal Inheritance: Philip II and the Spanish Netherlands. London, Gollancz, and New York, Doubleday, 1969.
- The Imperial Dream: The British Commonwealth and the Empire 1775–1969. London, Collins, 1972; as The Death of the Imperial Dream, New York, Doubleday (publisher), 1972.
- Confessions of a Country Magistrate, London, Gollancz, 1972.
- King of the Two Worlds: Philip II of Spain. London, Collins, and New York, Putnam, 1974.
- The Companion Guide to Northumbria. London, Collins, 1976.
