= Izola Curry =

American failed assassin (1916–2015)

- Born: Izola Ware; June 14, 1916; Adrian, Georgia, U.S.
- Died: March 7, 2015 (aged 98); Jamaica Estates, Queens, New York, U.S.
- Occupation: Housekeeper
- Known for: 1958 assassination attempt on Martin Luther King Jr.
- Spouse: James Curry (m. 1937, divorced)

Izola Curry (née Ware; June 14, 1916 – March 7, 2015) was a Black American woman who attempted to assassinate the civil rights leader Martin Luther King Jr. She stabbed King with a letter opener at a Harlem book signing on September 20, 1958, during the Harlem civil rights movement of the late 1950s and early 1960s.

== Early life ==
Curry was one of eight children born to sharecroppers in 1916 near Adrian, Georgia, a city about 100 miles northwest of Savannah. She left school in the seventh grade and later married a man named James Curry when she was 21. The couple separated about six months later, and Izola moved to New York City, where she found work as a housekeeper.

After moving to New York, Curry began to suffer delusions and schizophrenia, particularly about the National Association for the Advancement of Colored People. This contributed to employment difficulties, and she moved between various locations and jobs before returning to New York in late 1958.

== Assassination attempt on Martin Luther King Jr. ==
King went on a tour to promote his book, Stride Toward Freedom, soon after it was published. During a book signing at Blumstein's department store in Harlem, on September 20, 1958, Curry approached and asked him if he was Martin Luther King Jr. When King replied in the affirmative, Curry stabbed him in the chest with a steel letter opener.

An advertising executive for The Amsterdam News, a prominent Black newspaper, grabbed and restrained Curry. A well-meaning bystander reached out to pull the letter opener out of King's chest, but by this time New York City police officers Al Howard and Philip Romano had arrived upon the scene and acted quickly. They immediately recognized the risk of pulling out the opener and prevented the bystander from acting, then called Harlem Hospital to coordinate with doctors how to get King safely out of the store without risking having the knife be jarred. This included some subterfuge on the part of Officer Howard, announcing to the large assembled crowd that Dr. King would be taken to an ambulance arriving at the front of the store (and going there himself to wait, to maintain the ruse), while in actuality Officer Romano and others carefully carried him, still sitting in his chair, out the back.

Surgery was required to remove the blade. King wrote in his posthumously published autobiography that he was told that:

the razor tip of the instrument had been touching my aorta and that my whole chest had to be opened to extract it. 'If you had sneezed during all those hours of waiting,' Dr. Maynard said, 'your aorta would have been punctured and you would have drowned in your own blood.'

While he was still in the hospital, on September 30, King issued a press release in which he reaffirmed his belief in "the redemptive power of nonviolence" and issued a hopeful statement about his attacker: "I felt no ill will toward Mrs. Izola Currey [sic] and know that thoughtful people will do all in their power to see that she gets the help she apparently needs if she is to become a free and constructive member of society." He issued a similar statement on his return home, again stating that he hoped she would get help, and that society would improve so that "a disorganized personality need not become a menace to any man." On October 17, after hearing King's testimony, a grand jury indicted Curry for attempted murder.

At the time of her attack on King, Curry was also carrying a loaded Galesi-Brescia pistol, hidden inside her bra.

== Aftermath ==
Immediately after the stabbing, organizers of the upcoming Youth March for Integrated Schools (1958), of which King was an honorary chairman, postponed the march from October 11 to October 25. Responding to the outpouring of support, organizers Jackie Robinson and A. Philip Randolph noted that the march now had "a new dimension of importance" in the fight for desegregation in schools, and that many groups planned to increase their participation in it. Though King was unable to speak at the rally, his wife, Coretta Scott King, delivered remarks on his behalf.

A psychiatrist diagnosed Curry as a paranoid schizophrenic, reporting that Curry had an IQ of 70 and was in a severe "state of insanity". On October 20 she was found incapable of understanding the charge against her, and was committed to the Matteawan State Hospital for the Criminally Insane.

After 14 years at Matteawan, Curry was transferred to the Manhattan Psychiatric Center on Ward’s Island in Upper Manhattan, and then to a residential care program in Rosedale, Queens. After a fall resulting in a leg injury, Curry was placed in a Jamaica, Queens, New York nursing home, where she resided until her death. Curry died of natural causes.

== See also ==
- James Earl Ray, who assassinated King
