= History of Harlem =

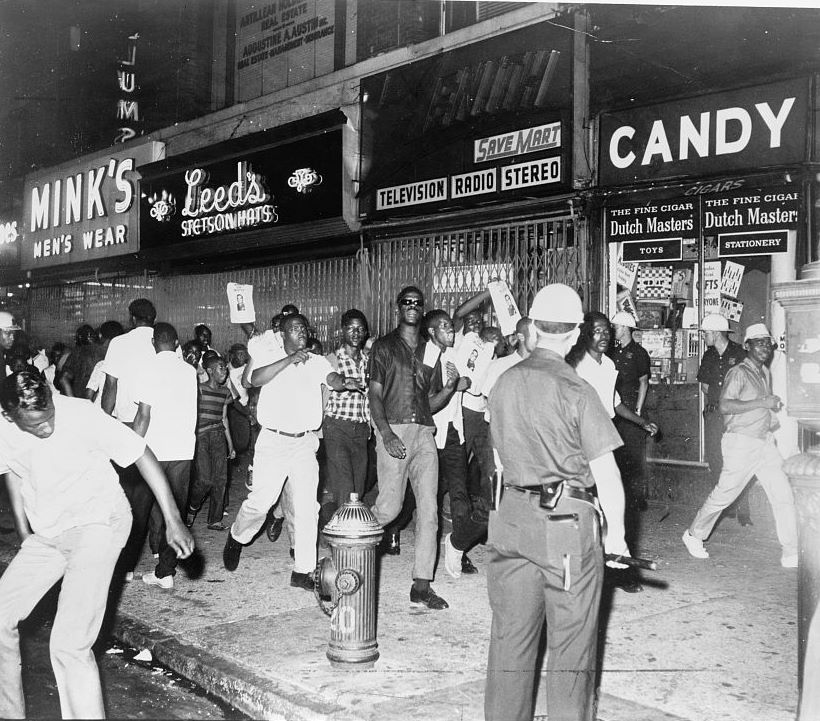
Demonstrators carrying photographs of Lieutenant Thomas Gilligan march on 125th Street near Seventh Avenue during the Harlem Riot of 1964

Founded in the 17th century as a Dutch outpost, Harlem developed into a farming village, a revolutionary battlefield, a resort town, and a commuter town.

== 1637–1866 ==
Before the arrival of European settlers, the area that would become Harlem (originally Haarlem) was inhabited by the Manhattans, a native tribe, who along with other Native Americans, most likely Lenape occupied the area on a semi-nomadic basis. As many as several hundred farmed the Harlem flatlands. The first European settlement in the area was by siblings Hendrick (Henry), Isaac and Rachel De Forest, Franco-Dutch immigrants in 1637. In 1639 Jochem Pietersen Kuyter established the homestead named Zegendaal, or Blessed Valley, stretched along the Harlem River from about the present 127th Street to 140th Street.

Early European settlers were forced to flee to New Amsterdam in lower Manhattan whenever hostilities with the natives heated up. The native population gradually decreased amidst conflict with the Dutch. The settlement was named Nieuw Haarlem (New Haarlem), after the Dutch city of Haarlem, and was formally incorporated in 1660 under the leadership of Peter Stuyvesant. The Indian trail to Harlem's lush bottomland meadows was rebuilt and eventually developed into the Boston Post Road.

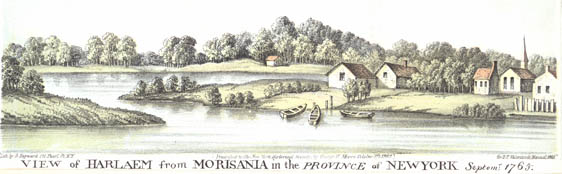
In 1765, Harlem was a small agricultural town not far from New York City.

In 1664, the English took control of the New Netherland colony, and English colonial Governor Richard Nicolls established the "Harlem Line" as the southern border patent line of the village of Nieuw Haarlem (later, the village of Harlem) running approximately northward between near modern East 74th Street, at the East River, and West 129th Street, on the Hudson River.

The British tried to change the name of the community to "Lancaster", but the name never stuck. They eventually settled on the Anglicized name Harlem. The Dutch took control of the area again for one year in 1673. The village grew very slowly until the middle 18th century, and it became a resort of sorts for the rich of New York City. Only the Morris-Jumel Mansion survives from this period.

Harlem played an important role in the American Revolution. The British had established their base of operations in lower Manhattan, and George Washington fortified the area around Harlem to oppose them. From Harlem, he could control the land routes to the north, as well as traffic on the Harlem River. The New York Provincial Congress met in White Plains, as did the convention drafting the constitution for New York State.

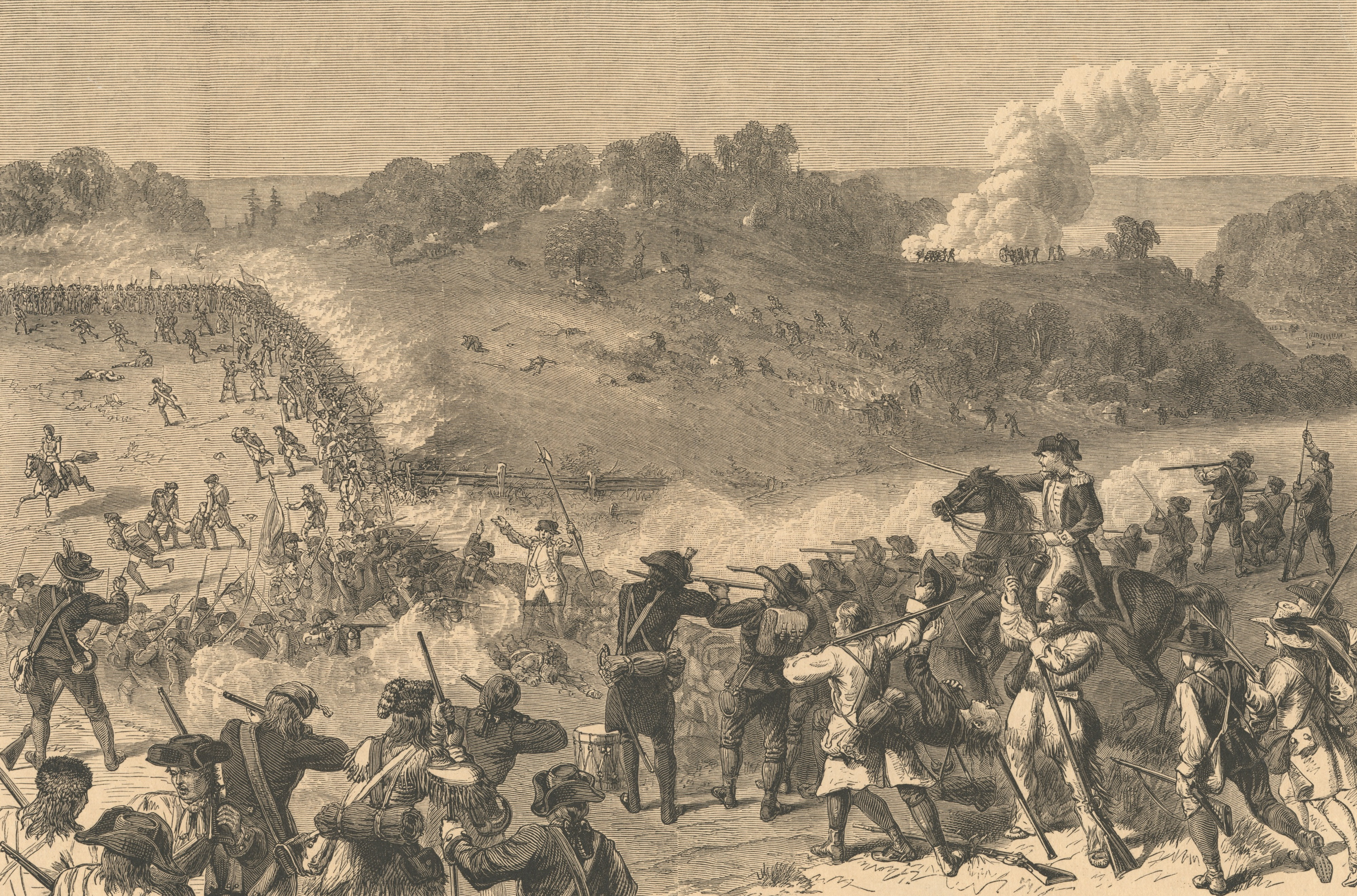
The Battle of Harlem Heights

On September 16, 1776, the Battle of Harlem Heights, sometimes referred to as the Battle of Harlem or Battle of Harlem Plain, was fought in western Harlem around the Hollow Way (now West 125th Street), with conflicts on Morningside Heights to the south and Harlem Heights to the north. The American troops were outnumbered, 5000 to 2000, and were ill-equipped compared to their opponents, but outflanked the British and forced them to retreat to the area around what is now West 106th Street. It was Washington's first American victory. On the night of September 20 Harlem burned to the ground with the rest of New York City in the Great Fire of New York.

Rebuilding took decades, and infrastructure was improved much more slowly than was happening in New York City proper. The village remained largely rural through the early 19th century and, though the "grid system" of streets, designed downtown, was formally extended to Harlem in 1811, it does not seem that anybody expected it would mean much. The 1811 report that accompanied the Commissioners' Plan of 1811 noted that it was "improbable that (for centuries to come) the grounds north of the Harlem Flat will be covered with houses."

Though undeveloped, the area was not poor. Harlem was "a synonym for elegant living through a good part of the nineteenth century." The village remained largely farmland estates, such as [Conrad] Van Keulen's Hook, orig. Otterspoor, bordered north of the Mill Creek (now 108th St., orig. Montagne Creek at 109th St.), which flowed into Harlem Lake, to the farm of Morris Randall, northwest on the Harlem River, and westward to the Peter Benson, or Mill Farm.

This former bowery [of land] was subdivided into twenty-two equal plots, of about 6 to 8 acres (32,000 m^{2}) each, of which portions later owned by Abraham Storm, including thirty-one acres (east of Fifth Avenue between 110th & 125th St.) were sold by Storm's widow Catherine in 1795 to James Roosevelt (great-grandfather of President Franklin D. Roosevelt, 1760–1847). This branch of the Roosevelt family subsequently moved to the town of Hyde Park, but several of Roosevelt's children remain interred in Harlem.

As late as 1820, the community had dwindled to 91 families, a church, a school, and a library. Wealthy farmers, known as "patroons", maintained these country estates largely on the heights overlooking the Hudson River. Service connecting the outlays of Harlem with the rest of the City of New York (on the southern tip of the island of Manhattan) was done via steamboat on the East River, an hour-and-a-half passage, sometimes interrupted when the river froze in winter, or else by stagecoach along the Boston Post Road, which descended from McGown's Pass (now in Central Park) and skirted the salt marshes around 110th Street, to pass through Harlem.

The New York and Harlem Railroad (now Metro North) was incorporated in 1831 to better link the city with Harlem and Westchester County, starting at a depot at East 23rd Street, and extending 127 miles (204 km) north to a railroad junction in Columbia County at Chatham, New York by 1851. Charles Henry Hall, a wealthy lawyer and land speculator, recognized the changes that this railroad would make possible in Harlem and began a successful program of infrastructure development, building out streets, gas lines, sewer lines, and other facilities needed for urban life.

Piers were also built, enabling Harlem to become an industrial suburb serving New York City. The rapid development of infrastructure enabled some to become wealthy, and the area became important to politicians, many of whom lived in Harlem. New York mayors Cornelius Van Wyck Lawrence and Daniel Tiemann both lived in Harlem in this period. For many in New York City, Harlem was at this time regarded as a sort of country retreat. The village had a population of poorer residents as well, including blacks, who came north to work in factories or to take advantage of relatively low rents.

Between 1850 and 1870, many large estates, including Hamilton Grange, the estate of Alexander Hamilton, were auctioned off as the fertile soil was depleted and crop yields fell. Some of the land became occupied by Irish squatters, whose presence further depressed property values.

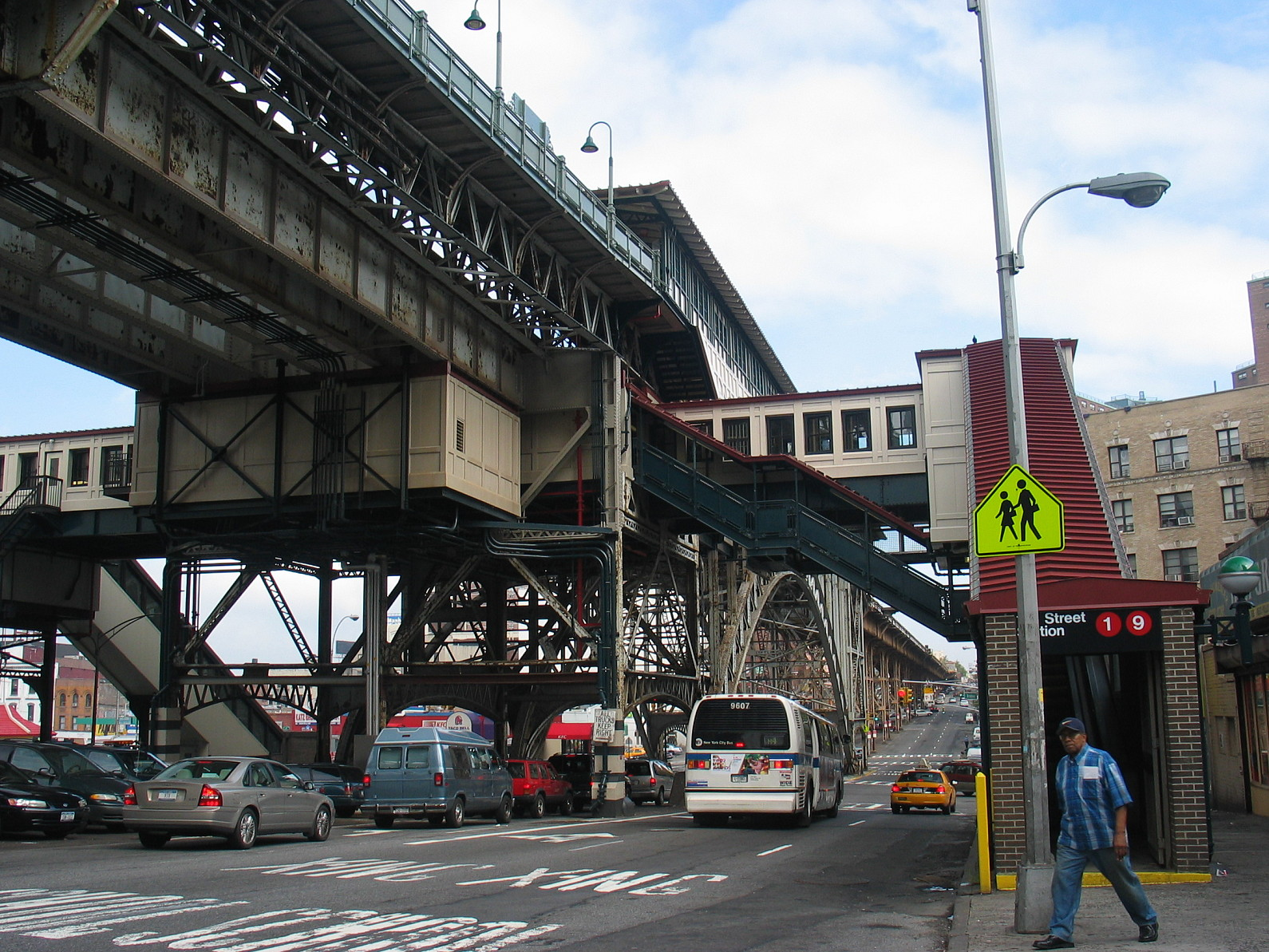
125th Street station on the IRT Broadway–Seventh Avenue Line.

== 1866–1920 ==
During the American Civil War, Harlem saw draft riots, along with the rest of the city, but the neighborhood was a significant beneficiary of the economic boom that followed the end of the war, starting in 1868. The neighborhood continued to serve as a refuge for New Yorkers, but increasingly those coming north were poor and Jewish or Italian. Factories, homes, churches, and retail buildings were built at great speed. The Panic of 1873 caused Harlem property values to drop 80%, and gave the City of New York the opportunity to annex the troubled community as far north as 155th Street.

Recovery came soon, and row houses (as distinct from the previous generation's free-standing houses) were being constructed in large numbers by 1876. Development accelerated in part in anticipation of elevated railroads, which were extended to Harlem in 1880. With the construction of the "els", urbanized development occurred very rapidly. Developers anticipated that the planned Lexington Avenue subway would ease transportation to lower Manhattan. Fearing that new housing regulations would be enacted in 1901, they rushed to complete as many new buildings as possible before these came into force.

Early entrepreneurs had grandiose schemes for Harlem: Polo was played at the original Polo Grounds, later to become home of the New York Giants baseball team. Oscar Hammerstein I opened the Harlem Opera House on East 125th Street in 1889. By 1893, even row houses did not suffice to meet the growing population, and large-scale apartment buildings were the norm. In that year, Harlem Monthly Magazine wrote that "it is evident to the most superficial observer that the centre of fashion, wealth, culture, and intelligence, must, in the near future, be found in the ancient and honorable village of Harlem."

However, also in that year, the construction glut and a delay in the building of the subway led to a fall in real estate prices which attracted immigrant Eastern Europe Jews and Italians to Harlem in accelerating numbers. There had been a Jewish community of 12 in Harlem in 1869 that grew to a peak of almost 200,000 in about 1915. Presaging their resistance to the arrival of blacks, existing landowners tried to stop Jews from moving into the neighborhood. At least one rental sign declared "Keine Juden und Keine Hunde" (No Jews and no dogs). Italians began to arrive in Harlem only a few years after the Jews did. By 1900 there were 150,000 Italians in Harlem. Both groups moved particularly into East Harlem.

The Jewish population of Harlem embraced the City College of New York, which moved to Harlem in 1907. In the years after the move, 90% of the school's students were Jewish, and many of the school's most distinguished graduates date from this period. Both the Jewish Mob and Italian Mafia emerged in East Harlem and soon expanded their operations to the entire neighborhood. West 116th Street between Lenox and 8th Avenue became a vice district. The neighborhood also became a major center for more conventional entertainment, with 125th Street as a particular center for musical theater, vaudeville, and moving pictures.

The Jewish presence in Harlem was ephemeral, and by 1930, only 5,000 Jews remained. As they left, their apartments in East Harlem were increasingly filled by Puerto Ricans, who were arriving in large numbers by 1913. Italian Harlem lasted longer, and traces of the community lasted into the 1980s and to the present in the area around Pleasant Avenue.

=== Black population increase ===
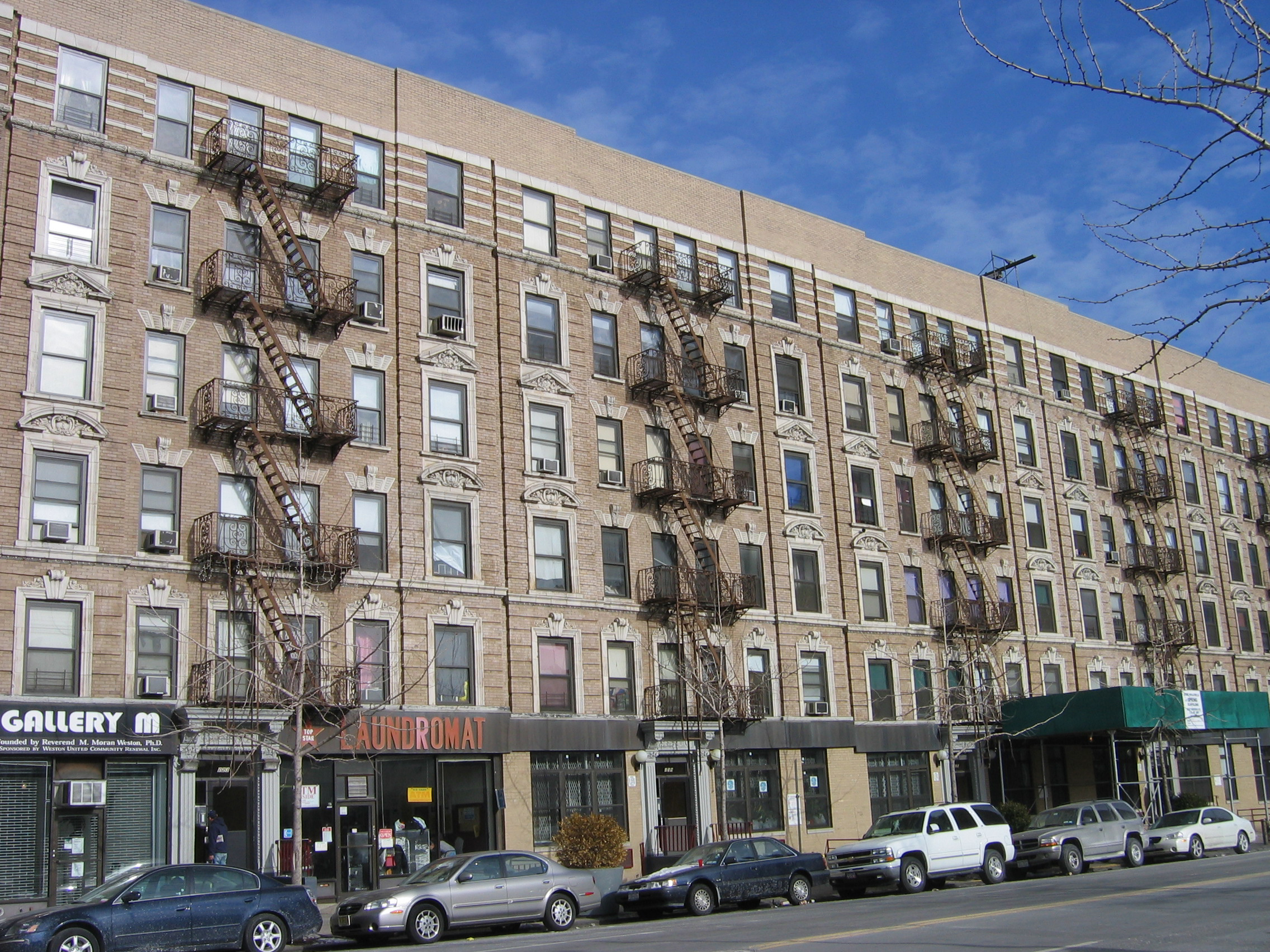
These buildings on West 135 Street were among the first in Harlem to be occupied entirely by blacks; in 1921, #135 became home to Young's Book Exchange, the first "Afrocentric" bookstore in Harlem.

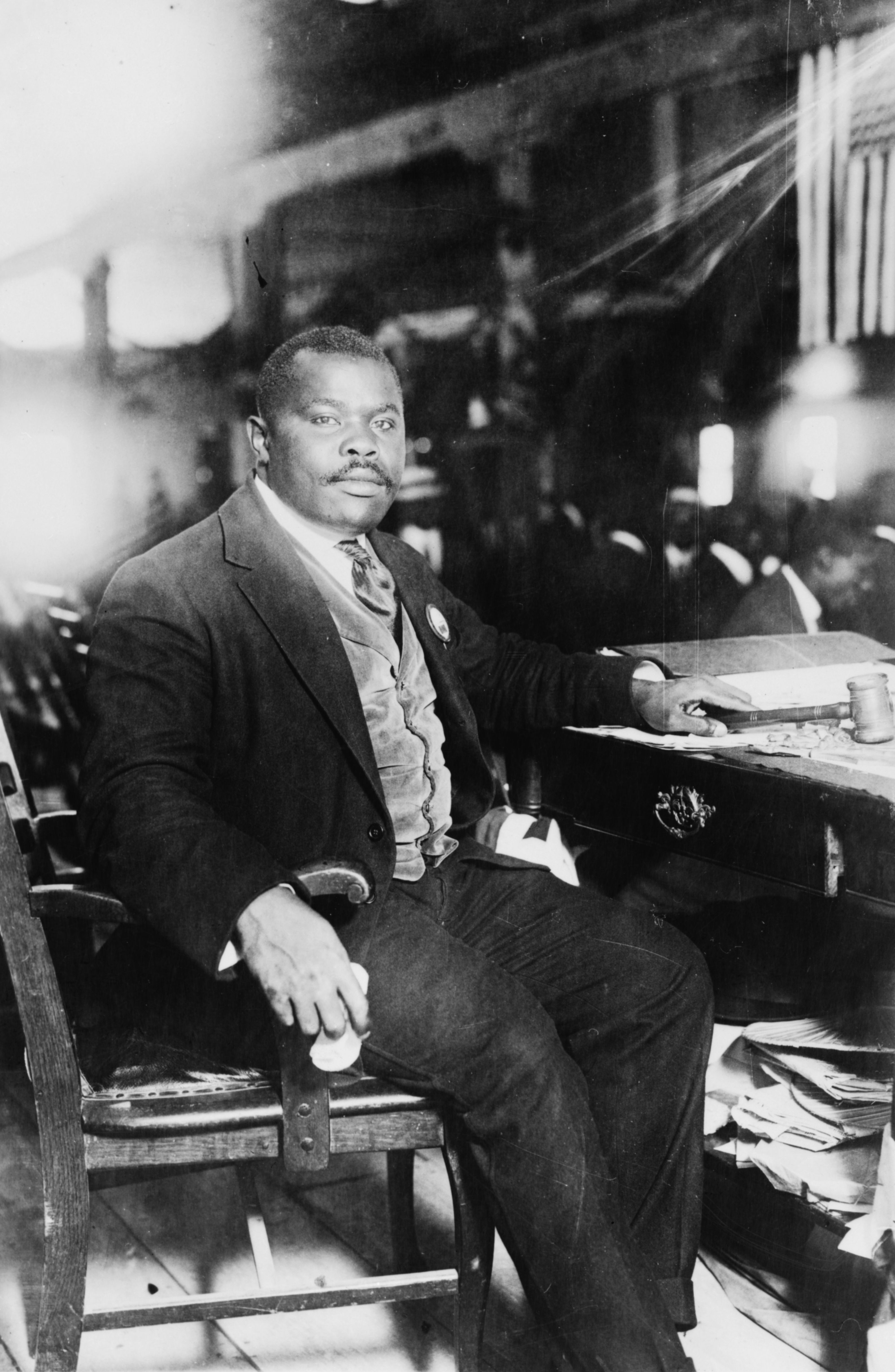
Marcus Garvey in 1925

Black residents have been present in Harlem continually since the 1630s, and as the neighborhood modernized in the late 19th century, they could be found especially in the area around 125th Street and in the "Negro tenements" on West 130th Street. By 1900, tens of thousands lived in Harlem. The mass migration of African Americans into the area began in 1904, due to another real estate crash, the worsening of conditions for black people elsewhere in the city, and the leadership of black real estate entrepreneurs including Phillip Payton Jr. After the collapse of the 1890s, new speculation and construction started up again in 1903 and the resulting glut of housing led to a crash in values in 1904 and 1905 that eclipsed the late-19th century slowdown.

Landlords could not find white renters for their properties, so Philip Payton stepped in to bring black people. His company, the Afro-American Realty Company, has been credited with the migration of black people from their previous neighborhoods, the Tenderloin, San Juan Hill (now the site of Lincoln Center), Little Africa around Minetta Lane in Greenwich Village and Hell's Kitchen in the west 40s and 50s.

The move to northern Manhattan was driven in part by fears that anti-black riots such as those that had occurred in the Tenderloin in 1900 and in San Juan Hill in 1905 might recur. In addition, a number of tenements that had been occupied by black people in the west 30s were destroyed at this time to make way for the construction of the original Penn Station.

In 1907, black churches began to move uptown. Several congregations built grand new church buildings, including St Philip's on West 134th Street just west of Seventh Avenue (the wealthiest church in Harlem), the Abyssinian Baptist Church on West 138th Street and St Mark's Methodist Church on Edgecombe Avenue. More often churches purchased buildings from white congregations of Christians and Jews whose members had left the neighborhood, including Metropolitan Baptist Church on West 128th and Seventh Avenue, St James Presbyterian Church on West 141st Street, and Mt Olivet Baptist Church on Lenox Avenue. Only the Catholic Church retained its churches in Harlem, with white priests presiding over parishes that retained significant numbers of white Catholics until the 1930s.

The early 20th-century Great Migration of black people to northern industrial cities was fueled by their desire to leave behind the Jim Crow South, seek better jobs and education for their children, and escape a culture of lynching violence. During World War I, expanding industries recruited black laborers to fill new jobs, thinly staffed after the draft began to take young men. So many black people came that it "threaten[ed] the very existence of some of the leading industries of Georgia, Florida, Tennessee and Alabama."

Many settled in Harlem. In 1910, Central Harlem was about 10% black. By 1920, central Harlem was 32.43% black. The 1930 census showed 70.18% of Central Harlem's residents as black and lived as far south as Central Park, at 110th Street. The expansion was fueled primarily by an influx of black people from the southern U.S. states, especially Virginia, North and South Carolina, and Georgia, who took trains up the East Coast. There were also numerous immigrants from the West Indies. As black people moved in, white residents left. Between 1920 and 1930, 118,792 white people left the neighborhood and 87,417 black people arrived.

Between 1907 and 1915, some white residents of Harlem resisted the neighborhood's change, especially once the swelling black population pressed west of Lenox Avenue, which served as an informal color line until the early 1920s. Some made pacts not to sell to or rent to black residents. Others tried to buy the property and evict black tenants, but the Afro-American Realty Company retaliated by buying other property and evicting white tenants. Some even attempted to convince banks to deny mortgages to black buyers, but soon gave up those efforts.

Soon after black people began to move into Harlem, the community became known as "the spiritual home of the Negro protest movement." The NAACP became active in Harlem in 1910 and Marcus Garvey's Universal Negro Improvement Association in 1916. The NAACP chapter there soon grew to be the largest in the country. Activist A. Philip Randolph lived in Harlem and published the radical magazine The Messenger starting in 1917. It was from Harlem that he organized the Brotherhood of Sleeping Car Porters. W. E. B. Du Bois lived and published in Harlem in the 1920s, as did James Weldon Johnson and Marcus Garvey.

=== Italian Harlems ===
Vestiges of Italian Harlem

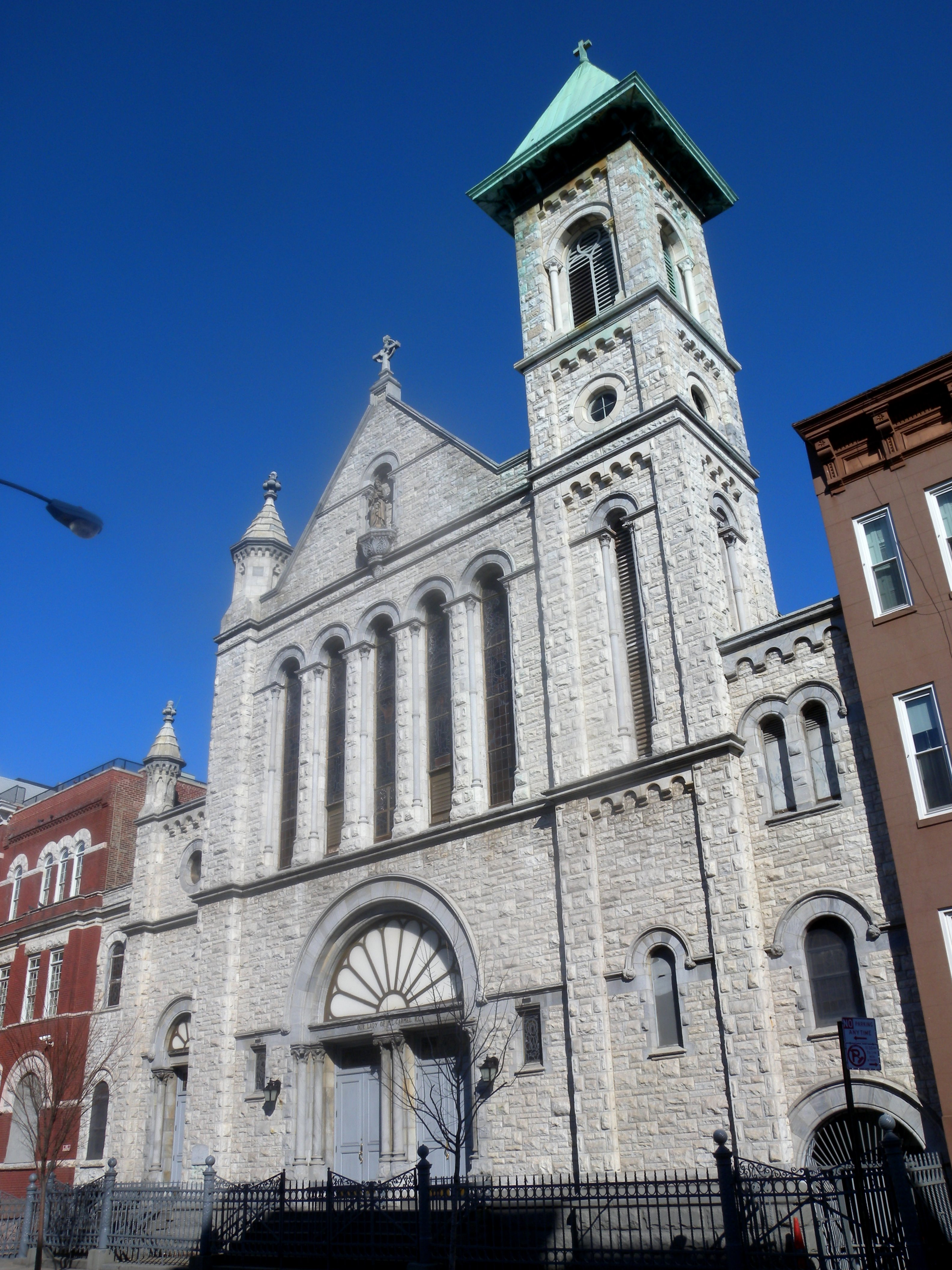
Church of Our Lady of Mt. Carmel

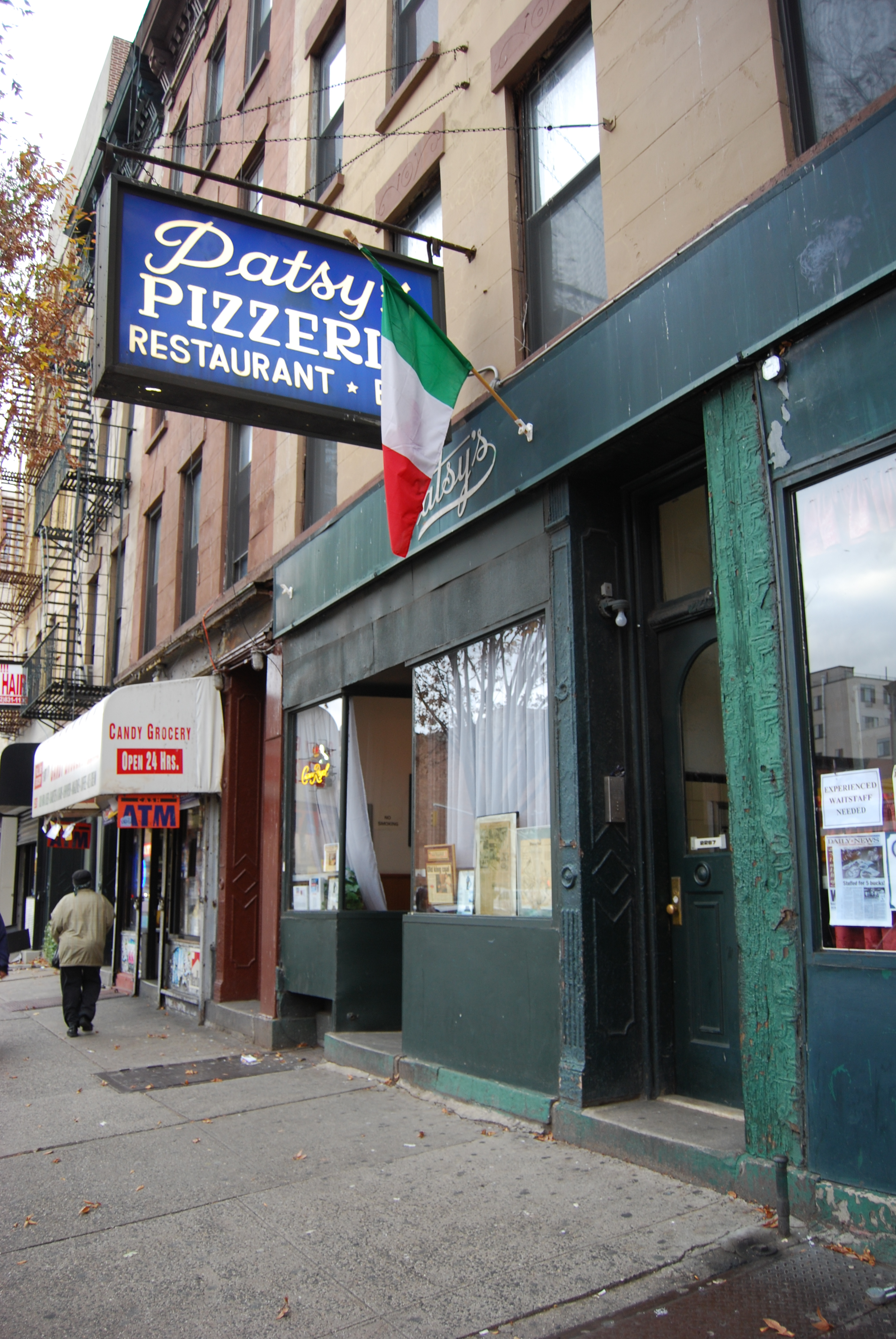
Patsy's Pizzeria

Southern Italians and Sicilians, with a moderate number of Northern Italians, soon predominated, especially in the area east of Lexington Avenue between 96th and 116th Streets and east of Madison Avenue between 116th and 125th Streets, with each street featuring people from different regions of Italy. The neighborhood became known as "Italian Harlem", the Italian American hub of Manhattan; it was the first part of Manhattan to be referred to as "Little Italy". The first Italians arrived in East Harlem in 1878, from Polla in the province of Salerno, and settled in the vicinity of 115th Street.

There were many crime syndicates in Italian Harlem from the early Black Hand to the bigger and more organized Italian gangs that formed the Italian-American Mafia. It was the founding location of the Genovese crime family, one of the Five Families that dominated organized crime in New York City.

In the 1920s and early 1930s, Italian Harlem was represented in Congress by future Mayor Fiorello La Guardia, and later by Italian-American socialist Vito Marcantonio. The Italian neighborhood approached its peak in the 1930s, with over 100,000 Italian-Americans living in its crowded, run-down apartment buildings. The 1930 census showed that 81 percent of the population of Italian Harlem consisted of first- or second-generation Italian Americans. (Somewhat less than the concentration of Italian Americans in the Lower East Side's Little Italy with 88 percent; Italian Harlem's total population, however, was three times that of Little Italy.)

Although in certain areas, particularly around Pleasant Avenue, Italian Harlem lasted through the 1970s, today most of the former Italian population is gone. Most of these predominantly older residents are clustered around Our Lady of Mount Carmel Church, mainly from 114th to 118th Streets. According to the 2000 Census, there were only 1,130 Italian-Americans still living in this area.

Still, vestiges of the old Italian neighborhood remain. The annual Feast of Our Lady of Mount Carmel and the "Dancing of the Giglio", the first Italian feast in New York City, is still celebrated there every year on the second weekend of August by the Giglio Society of East Harlem. Italian retail establishments still exist, such as Rao's restaurant, started in 1896, and the original Patsy's Pizzeria which opened in the 1933. In May 2011, one of the last remaining Italian retail businesses in the neighborhood, a barbershop owned by Claudio Caponigro on 116th Street, was threatened with closure by a rent increase.

== 1921–1929 ==
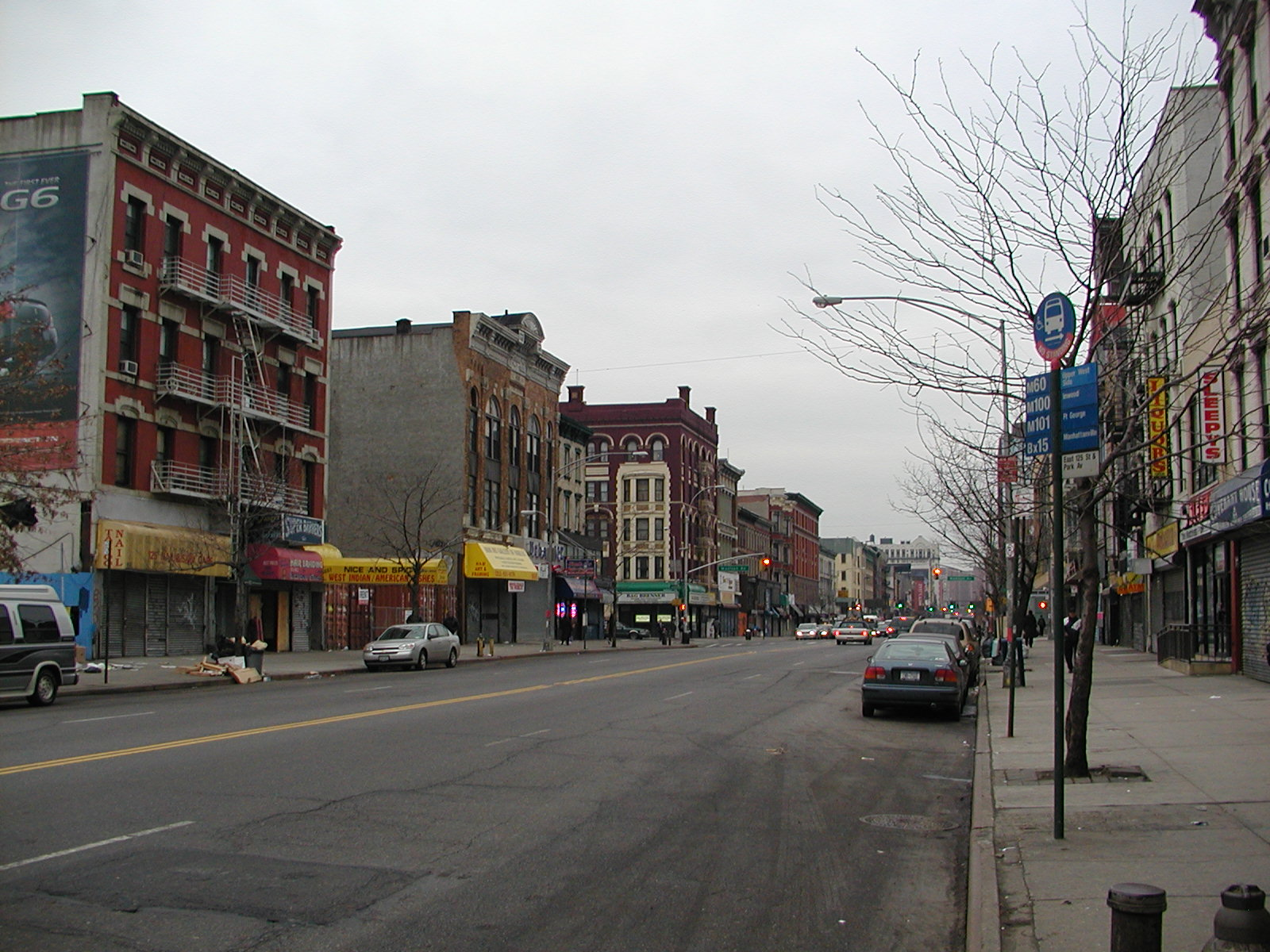
125th Street between Park and Madison Avenues

Starting around the time of the end of World War I, Harlem became associated with the New Negro movement, and then the artistic outpouring known as the Harlem Renaissance, which extended to poetry, novels, theater, and the visual arts.

The growing population also supported a rich fabric of organizations and activities in the 1920s. Fraternal orders such as the Prince Hall Masons and the Benevolent and Protective Order of Elks set up lodges in Harlem, with elaborate buildings including auditoriums and large bands. Parades of lodge members decked out in uniforms and accompanied by band music were a common sight on Harlem's streets, on public holidays, lodge anniversaries, church festivities and funerals.

The neighborhood's churches housed a range of groups, including athletic clubs, choirs and social clubs. A similar range of activities could be found at the YMCA on 135th Street and the YWCA on 137th Street. The social pages of Harlem's two African-American newspapers, the New York Age and the New York Amsterdam News, recorded the meetings, dinners and dances of hundreds of small clubs. Soapbox speakers drew crowds on Seventh and Lenox Avenues until the 1960s, some offering political oratory, with Hubert Harrison the most famous, while others, particularly in the late 1920s, sold medicine.

Harlem also offered a wealth of sporting events: the Lincoln Giants played baseball at Olympic Field at 136th and Fifth Avenue until 1920, after which residents had to travel to the Catholic Protectory Oval in the Bronx; men's and women's basketball teams from local athletic clubs played in church gymnasiums, and, as they became more popular, at the Manhattan Casino on 155th Street, before giving way to professional teams, most famously the Rens, based at the Renaissance Ballroom on Seventh Avenue; and boxing bouts took place at the Commonwealth Casino on East 135th Street (run by white promoters the McMahon brothers). The biggest crowds, including many whites, came to see black athletes compete against whites.

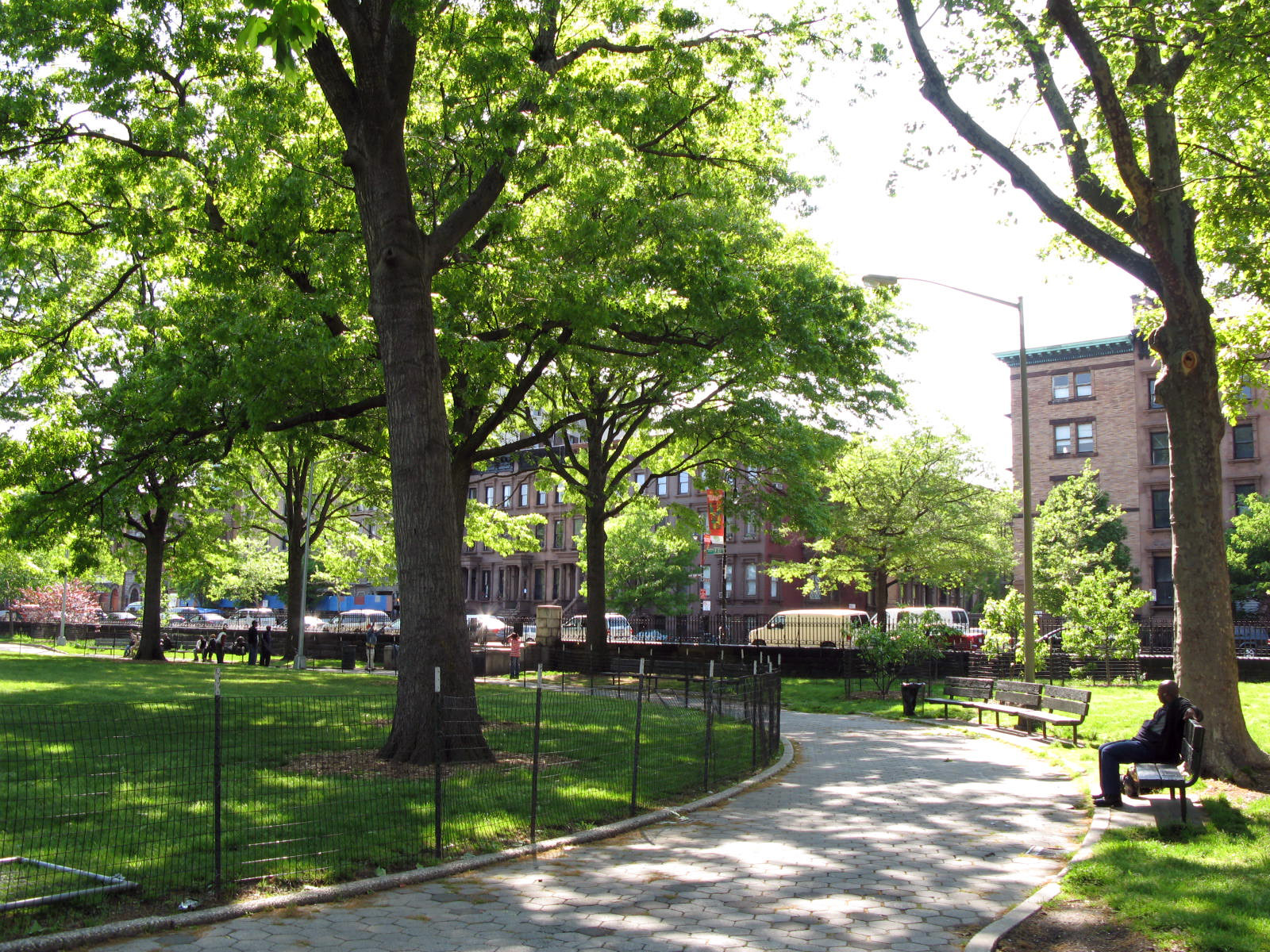
Marcus Garvey Park

In 1921 Belstrat laundry was Incorporated in Harlem. With over 65 employees and twenty horses and carriages, Belstrat was the largest employer in Harlem. Founded by David R. and Collins Doles. Mr Doles was also the president of The Business Mens Club of Harlem. It took years for business ownership to reflect the new reality. A survey in 1929 found that whites owned and operated 81.51% of the neighborhood's 10,319 businesses, with beauty parlors making up the largest number of black-owned businesses. By the late 1960s, 60% of the businesses in Harlem responding to surveys reported ownership by blacks, and an overwhelming fraction of new businesses were black owned after that time.

Marginalized in the legitimate economy, a small group of blacks found success outside the law, running gambling on numbers. Invented in 1920 or 1921, numbers had exploded by 1924 into a racket turning over tens of millions of dollars every year. That year the New York Age reported that there were at least thirty bankers (the name given to someone running a numbers game) in Harlem, with many employing between twelve and twenty people to collect bets, and Marcellino, the largest banker, employing over one hundred. By the late 1920s, Wallace Thurman guessed there were over a thousand collectors taking bets from 100,000 clients a day.

The most successful bankers, who could earn enormous sums of money, were known as Kings and Queens. The wealthiest numbers king of all was almost certainly the reputed inventor of the game, Casper Holstein. He owned a fleet of cars, apartment buildings in Harlem and a home on Long Island, but did not have the ostentatious style and lifestyle of many other kings. He, and other bankers, gave money to charities and loans to aspiring businessmen and needy residents. Holstein's role in the community extended further than most of his colleagues, included membership in the Monarch Lodge of the Elks, support for Marcus Garvey's Universal Negro Improvement Association, philanthropy in his native Virgin Islands, and patronage of the Harlem Renaissance.

Harlem adapted rapidly to the coming of Prohibition, and its theaters, nightclubs, and speakeasies became major entertainment destinations. Claude McKay would write that Harlem had become "an all white picnic ground", and in 1927 Rudolph Fisher published an article titled "The Caucasian Storms Harlem". Langston Hughes described this period at length, including this passage from his 1940 autobiography,

White people began to come to Harlem in droves. For several years they packed the expensive Cotton Club on Lenox Avenue. But I was never there, because the Cotton Club was a Jim Crow club for gangsters and monied whites. They were not cordial to Negro patronage, unless you were a celebrity like Bojangles. So Harlem Negroes did not like the Cotton Club and never appreciated its Jim Crow policy in the very heart of their dark community. Nor did ordinary Negroes like the growing influx of whites toward Harlem after sundown, flooding the little cabarets and bars where formerly only colored people laughed and sang, and where now the strangers were given the best ringside tables to sit and stare at the Negro customers—like amusing animals in a zoo.

— Langston Hughes, The Big Sea

In response to the white influx, some blacks operated alternative venues in their homes. Called buffet flats, they offered alcohol, music, dancing, prostitutes, and, commonly, gambling, and, less often, rooms to which a couple could go. Their location in residential buildings, typically on cross streets above 140th Street, away from the nightclubs and speakeasies on the avenues, offered a degree of privacy from police, and from whites: you could only find a buffet flat if you knew the address and apartment number, which hosts did not advertise.

Puerto Rican and Latin American immigration after the First World War established an enclave at the western portion of East Harlem – around 110th Street and Lexington Avenue – which became known as "Spanish Harlem". The area slowly grew to encompass all of East Harlem, including Italian Harlem, as Italians moved out – to the Bronx, Brooklyn, upstate New York, and New Jersey – and Hispanics moved in during another wave of immigration in the 1940s and 1950s.

The newly dominant Puerto Rican population, which reached 63,000 in 1950, continued to define the neighborhood according to its needs, establishing bodegas and botánicas as it expanded; by the 1930s there was already an enclosed street market underneath the Park Avenue railroad viaduct between 111th and 116th Streets, called "La Marqueta" ("The Market"). Catholic and evangelistic Protestant churches appeared in storefronts. Although "Spanish Harlem" had been in use since at least the 1930s to describe the Hispanic enclave – along with "Italian Harlem" and "Negro Harlem" – around the 1950s the name began to be used to describe the entire East Harlem neighborhood. Later, the name "El Barrio" ("The Neighborhood") began to be used, especially by inhabitants of the area.

Since the 1920s, this period of Harlem's history has been highly romanticized. With the increase in a poor population, it was also the time when the neighborhood began to deteriorate to a slum, and some of the storied traditions of the Harlem Renaissance were driven by poverty, crime, or other social ills. For example, in this period, Harlem became known for "rent parties", informal gatherings in which bootleg alcohol was served and music played. Neighbors paid to attend, and thus enabled the host to make his or her monthly rent. Though picturesque, these parties were thrown out of necessity.

Further, over a quarter of black households in Harlem made their monthly rent by taking in lodgers, many of whom were family members, but who sometimes brought bad habits or even crime that disrupted the lives of respectable families. Lodgers also experienced disruption, with many having to move frequently when households relocated, roommates quarreled or they could not pay rent. Urban reformers campaigned to eliminate the "lodger evil" but the problem got worse before it got better; in 1940, still affected by the Depression, 40% of black families in Harlem were taking in lodgers.

The high rents and poor maintenance of housing stock, which Harlem residents suffered through much of the 20th century, was not merely the product of racism by white landlords. By 1914, 40% of Harlem's private houses and 10% of its tenements were owned by blacks. Wealthier blacks continued to purchase land in Harlem, and by 1920, a significant portion of the neighborhood was owned by blacks. By the late 1960s, 60% of the businesses in Harlem responding to surveys reported ownership by blacks, and an overwhelming fraction of new businesses were black owned after that time.

In 1928, the first effort at housing reform was attempted in Harlem with the construction of the Paul Laurence Dunbar Houses, backed by John D. Rockefeller Jr. These were intended to give working people of modest means the opportunity to live in and, over time, purchase, houses of their own. The Great Depression hit shortly after the buildings opened, and the experiment failed. They were followed in 1936 by the Harlem River Houses, a more modest experiment in housing projects. And by 1964, nine giant public housing projects had been constructed in the neighborhood, housing over 41,000 people.

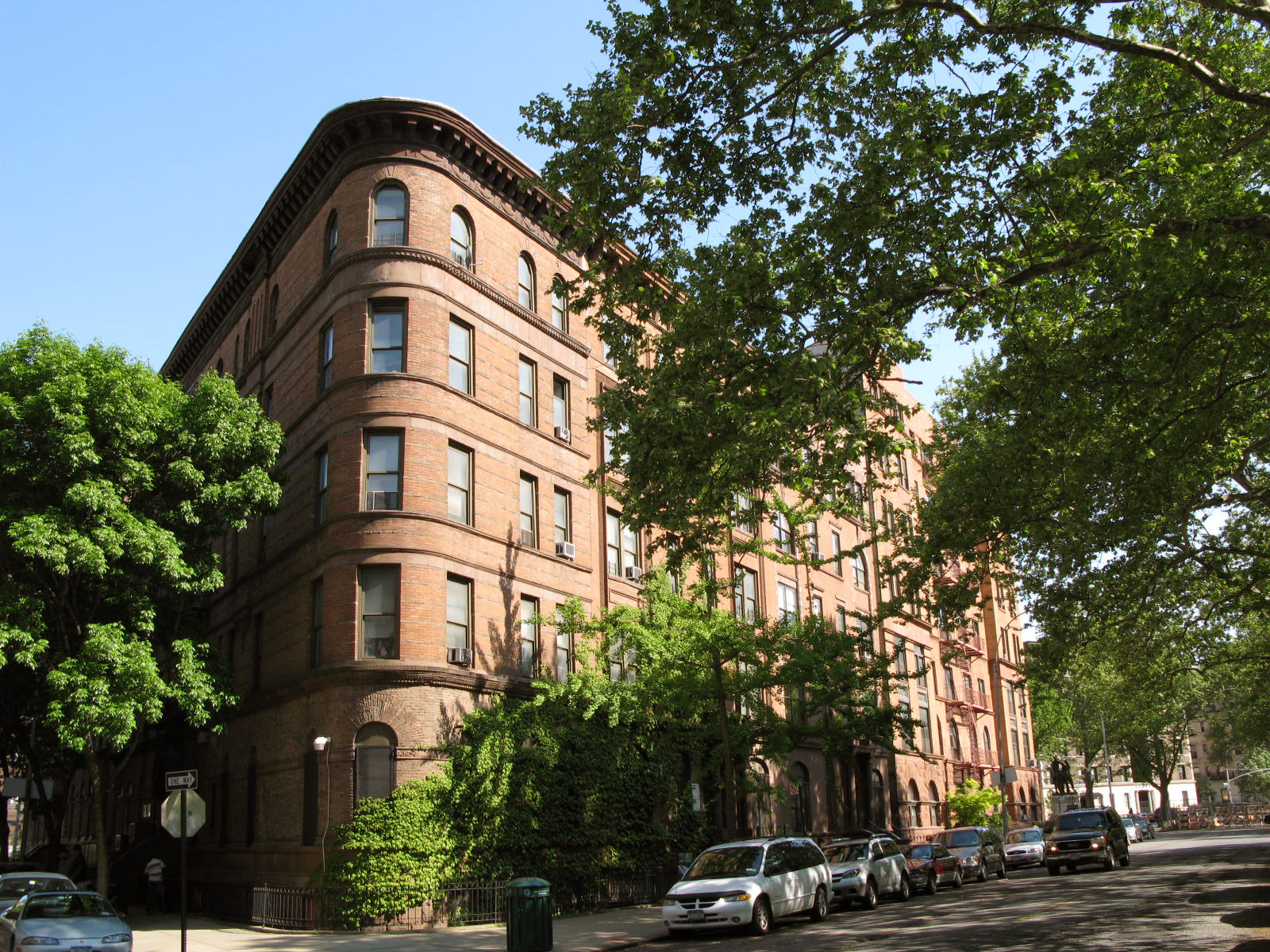
Stately Harlem apartment buildings adjacent to Morningside Park

== 1930–1945 ==
The job losses of the Depression were exacerbated by the end of Prohibition in 1933 and by the Harlem Riot of 1935, which scared away the wealthier whites who had long supported Harlem's entertainment industry. White audiences decreased almost totally after a second round of riots in 1943. Many Harlemites found work in the military or in the Brooklyn shipyards during World War II, but the neighborhood declined rapidly once the war ended. Some middle-class blacks moved north or west to suburbs, a trend that increased after the 1960s Civil Rights Movement decreased discrimination in housing.

The neighborhood enjoyed few benefits from the massive public works projects in New York under Robert Moses in the 1930s, and as a result had fewer parks and public recreational sites than other New York neighborhoods. Of the 255 playgrounds Moses built in New York City, he placed only one in Harlem.

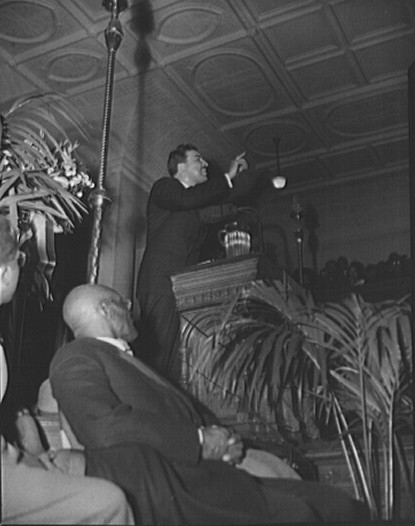
Adam Clayton Powell Jr. addressing a citizens' committee mass meeting in 1942

The earliest activism by blacks to change the situation in Harlem itself grew out of the Great Depression, with the "Don't Buy Where You Can't Work" movement. This was the ultimately successful campaign to force retail shops on 125th Street to hire black employees. Boycotts were originally organized by the Citizens' League for Fair Play in June 1934 against Blumstein's Department Store on 125th Street. The store soon agreed to integrate its staff more fully. This success emboldened Harlem residents, and protests continued under other leadership, including that of preacher and later congressman Adam Clayton Powell Jr., seeking to change hiring practices at other stores, to effect the hiring of more black workers, or the hiring of members of particular protesting groups.

Communism gained a following in Harlem in the 1930s and continued to play a role through the 1940s. In 1935, the first of Harlem's five riots broke out. The incident started with a boy that was supposedly caught stealing from a store on 125th Street had been killed by the police. By the time it was over, 600 stores had been looted and three men were dead. The same year saw internationalism in Harlem politics, as Harlemites responded to the Italian invasion of Ethiopia by holding giant rallies, signing petitions and sending an appeal to the League of Nations. Such internationalism continued intermittently, including broad demonstrations in favor of Egyptian president Nasser after the Suez invasion of 1956.

Black Harlemites took positions in the elected political infrastructure of New York starting in 1941 with the election of Adam Clayton Powell Jr. to the City Council. He was easily elected to Congress when a congressional district was placed in Harlem in 1944, leaving his City Council seat to be won by another black Harlemite, Benjamin J. Davis. Ironically, Harlem's political strength soon deteriorated, as Clayton Powell Jr. spent his time in Washington or his vacation home in Puerto Rico, and Davis was jailed in 1951 for violations of the Smith Act.

The year 1943 saw the second Harlem riot. Allegedly, a black soldier knocked down a policeman who then shot him. An onlooker shouted that the soldier had been killed, and this news spread throughout the black community and provoked rioting. A force of 6,600, made up of city police, military police and civil patrolmen, in addition to 8,000 State Guardsmen and 1,500 civilian volunteers was required to end the violence. Hundreds of businesses were destroyed and looted, the property damage approaching $225,000. Overall, six people died and 185 were injured. Five hundred people were arrested in connection with the riot.

== 1946–1969 ==
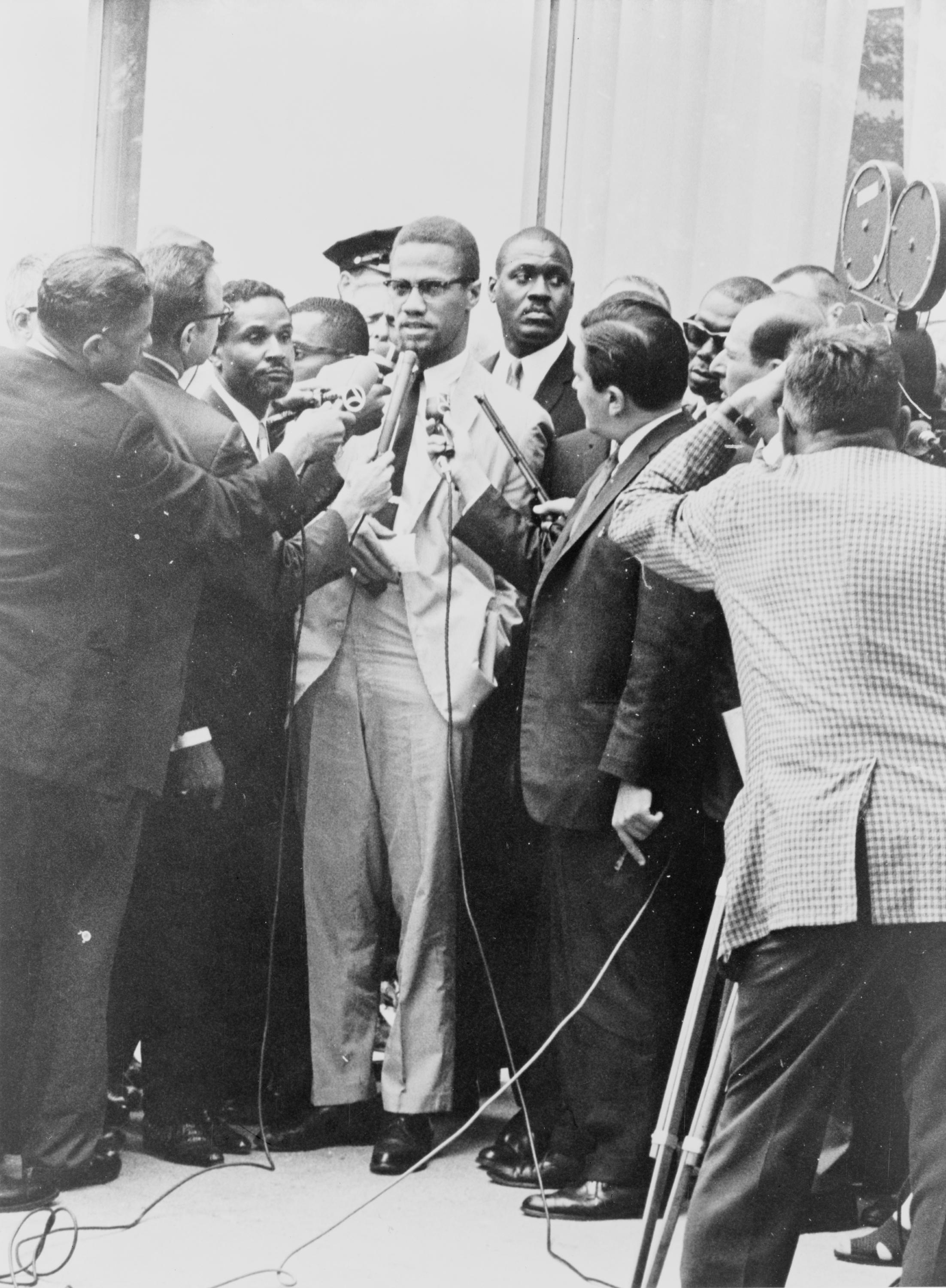
Malcolm X at a 1964 press conference

Many groups mobilized in Harlem in the 1960s, fighting for better schools, jobs, and housing. Some were peaceful and others advocated violence. By the early 1960s, the Congress of Racial Equality (CORE) had offices on 125th street, and acted as negotiator for the community with the city, especially in times of racial unrest. They urged civilian review boards to hear complaints of police abuse, a demand that was ultimately met. As chairman of the House Committee of Education and Labor at the start of the 1960s, Adam Clayton Powell Jr. used this position to direct federal funds to various development projects in Harlem.

The largest public works projects in Harlem in these years were public housing, with the largest concentration built in East Harlem. Typically, existing structures were torn down and replaced with city-designed and managed properties that would, in theory, present a safer and more pleasant environment than those available from private landlords. Ultimately, community objections halted the construction of new projects.

From the mid-20th century, the terrible quality of local schools has been a source of distress. In the 1960s, about 75% of Harlem students tested under grade levels in reading skills, and 80% tested under grade level in math. In 1964, residents of Harlem staged two school boycotts to call attention to the problem. In central Harlem, 92% of students stayed home.

=== 1960s race riots ===
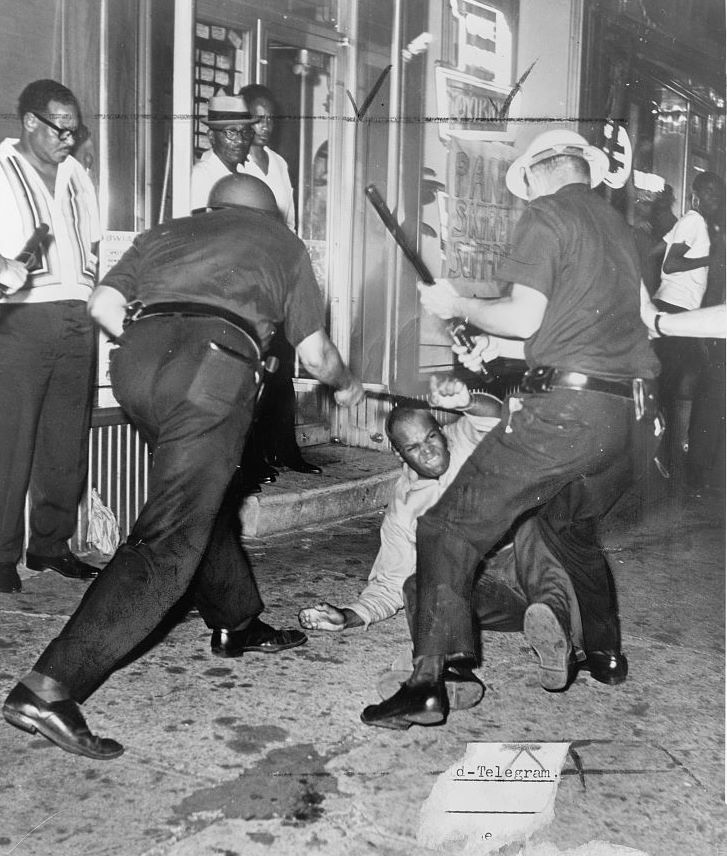
An incident at 133rd Street and Seventh Avenue during the Harlem Riot of 1964.

The influence of the southern nonviolent protest movement was muted in Harlem. Rev. Dr. Martin Luther King Jr. was the black leader most respected in Harlem. But on September 20, 1958, Izola Curry, deluded into believing the NAACP was controlled by Communists, approached Dr. King at a Blumstein's book-signing, and asked him if he was Martin Luther King Jr. When King replied in the affirmative, she said, "I've been looking for you for five years", then thrust a letter opener into his chest. NYPD officers took King, still in the chair where he had sat, to an ambulance that took him to Harlem Hospital, for removal of the blade. Reportage recalling the event for Martin Luther King Jr. Day in 2014, noted:

As it happened, one of the cops was black, the other white and the same was the case with the two surgeons. Each pair worked as true partners, proving that the color of their skin meant nothing and translating the content of their character into life-saving action.

At least two dozen groups of black nationalists also operated in New York, many of them in Harlem. The most important of these was the Nation of Islam, whose Temple Number Seven was run by Malcolm X from 1952 to 1963. Malcolm X was assassinated in the Audubon Ballroom in Washington Heights in 1965. The neighborhood remains an important center for the Nation of Islam.

In 1963, Inspector Lloyd Sealy became the first African-American officer of the NYPD to command a police station, the 28th precinct in Harlem. Community relations between Harlem residents and the NYPD were strained as civil rights activists requested that the NYPD hire more black police officers, specifically in Harlem. In 1964, across Harlem's three precincts, the ratio was one black police officer for every six white officers.

A riot occurred in the summer of 1964 following the fatal shooting of an unarmed 15-year-old black teenager by an off-duty white police lieutenant. One person was killed, more than 100 were injured, and hundreds more were arrested. Property damage and looting were extensive. The riot would later spread out of Manhattan and into the borough of Brooklyn and neighborhood of Bedford-Stuyvesant, the heart of Brooklyn's African-American community. In the aftermath of the riots, the federal government funded a pilot program called Project Uplift, in which thousands of young people in Harlem were given jobs during the summer of 1965. The project was inspired by a report generated by HARYOU called Youth in the Ghetto. HARYOU was given a major role in organizing the project, along with the National Urban League and nearly 100 smaller community organizations.

In 1966, the Black Panthers organized a group in Harlem, agitating for violence in pursuit of change. Speaking at a rally of the Student Nonviolent Coordinating Committee (SNCC), Max Stanford, a Black Panther, declared that the United States "could be brought down to its knees with a rag and some gasoline and a bottle."

In April 1968, Harlemites rioted after the assassination of Martin Luther King Jr., as did black residents in over 100 other U.S. cities. Two people died—one stabbed to death in a crowd and another trapped in a burning building. However, the rioting in New York was minor compared to that in other American cities. Mayor John Lindsay helped to quell the rioting by marching up Lenox Avenue in a "hail of bricks" to confront the angry crowds. (See also King assassination riots.)

=== Housing stock ===
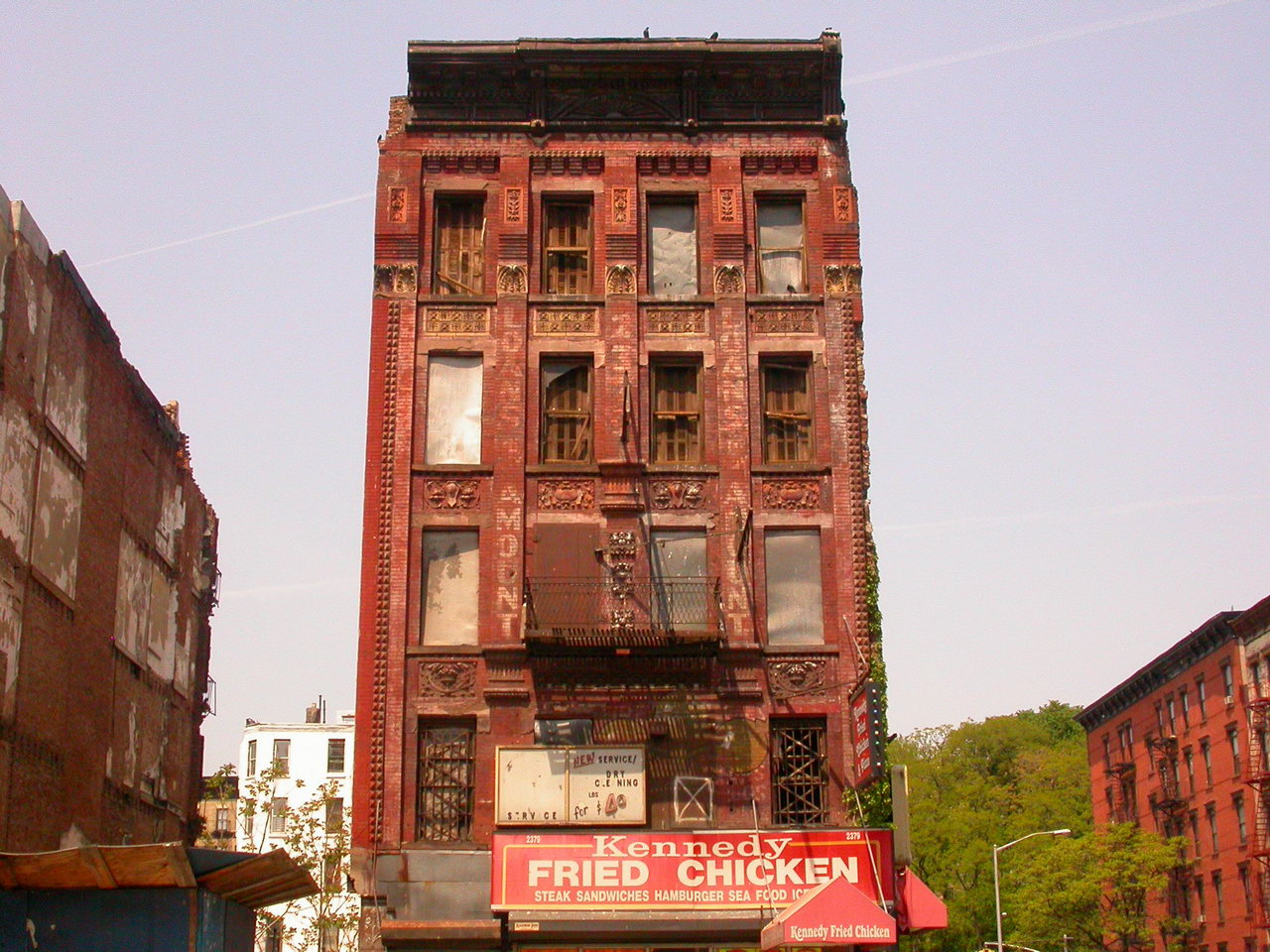
A dilapidated Harlem building, photographed on May 14, 2005. The building has since been demolished.

Little investment in private homes or businesses took place in the neighborhood between 1911 and the 1990s. However, the unwillingness of landlords elsewhere in the city to rent to black tenants, together with a significant increase in the black population of New York, meant that rents in Harlem were for many years higher than rents elsewhere in the city, even as the housing stock decayed. In 1920, one-room apartments in central Harlem rented for $40 to whites or $100–$125 to blacks. In the late 1920s, a typical white working-class family in New York paid $6.67 per month per room, while blacks in Harlem paid $9.50 for the same space.

The worse the accommodations and more desperate the renter, the higher the rents would be. This pattern persisted through the 1960s; in 1965, CERGE reported that a one-room apartment in Harlem rented for $50–$74, while comparable apartments rented for $30–$49 in white slums. The high rents encouraged some property speculators to engage in block busting, a practice whereby they would acquire a single property on a block and sell or rent it to blacks with great publicity. Other landowners would panic, and the speculators would then buy additional houses relatively cheaply. These houses could then be rented profitably to blacks.

After the Harlem River Houses, America's first federally subsidized housing project, were opened in 1937, other massive housing projects soon followed, with tens of thousands of units constructed over the next twenty years, especially in Harlem.

In the post-World War II era, Harlem ceased to be home to a majority of the city's blacks, but it remained the cultural and political capital of black New York, and possibly black America. The character of the community changed in the years after the war, as middle-class blacks left for the outer boroughs (primarily the Bronx, Queens and Brooklyn) and suburbs. The percentage of Harlem that was black peaked in 1950, at 98.2%. Thereafter, Hispanic, Asian, and white residents have increased their share.

The high cost of space forced people to live in close quarters, and the population density of Harlem in these years was stunning—over 215,000 per square mile in the 1920s. By comparison, in 2000, Manhattan as a whole had a population density under 70,000 per square mile. The same forces that allowed landlords to charge more for Harlem space also enabled them to maintain it less, and many of the residential buildings in Harlem fell into disrepair. The 1960 census showed only 51% of housing in Harlem to be "sound", as opposed to 85% elsewhere in New York City.

In 1968, the New York City Buildings Department received 500 complaints daily of rats in Harlem buildings, falling plaster, lack of heat, and unsanitary plumbing. Tenants were sometimes to blame; some would strip wiring and fixtures from their buildings to sell, throw garbage in hallways and airshafts, or otherwise damage the properties which they lived in or visited.

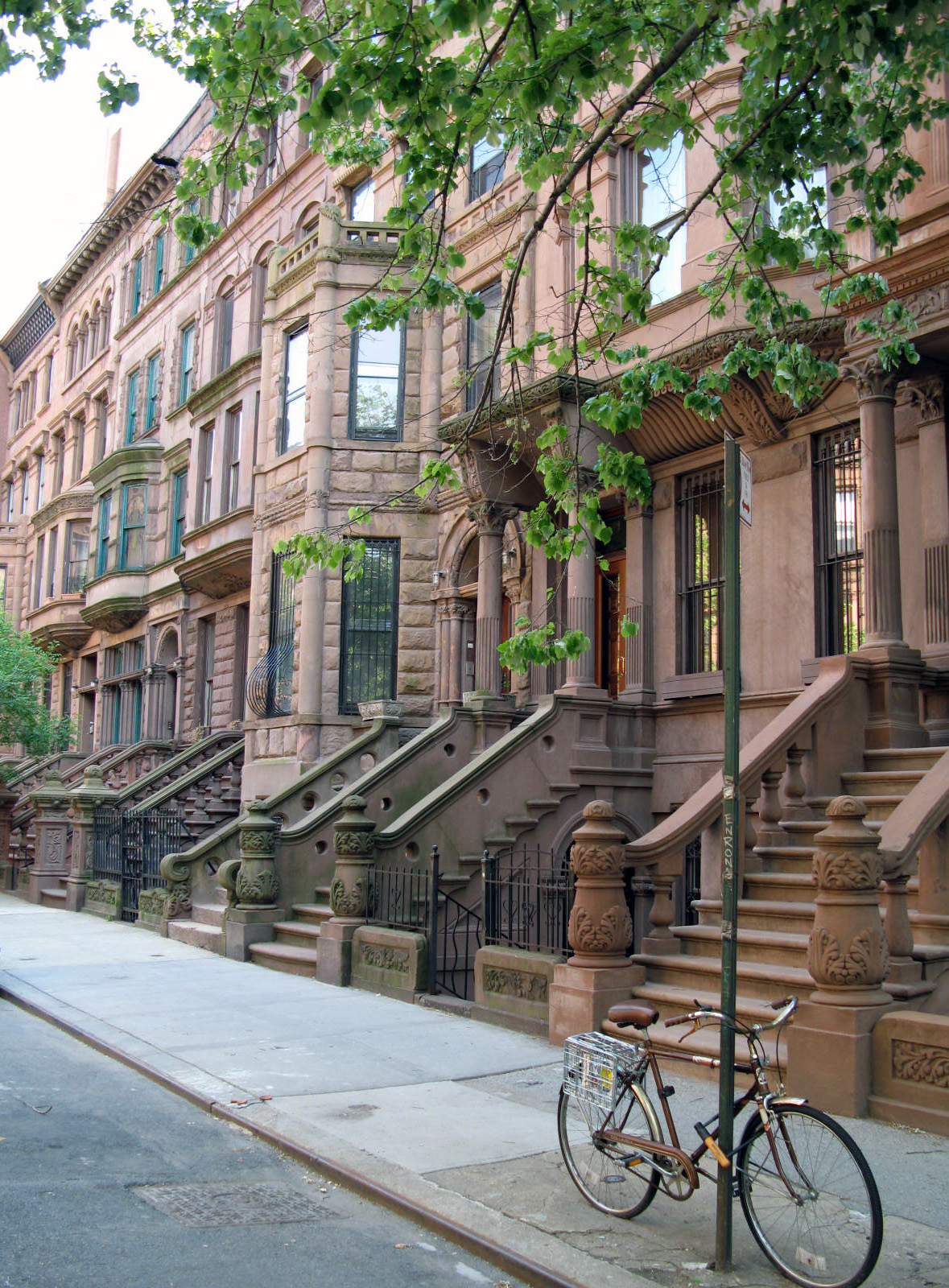
Harlem has many townhouses, such as these in the Mount Morris Historic District.

As the building stock decayed, landlords converted many buildings into "single-room occupancies", or SROs, essentially private homeless shelters. In many cases, the income from these buildings could not support the fines and city taxes charged to their owners, or the houses suffered damage that would have been expensive to fix, and the buildings were abandoned. In the 1970s, this process accelerated to the point that Harlem, for the first time since before World War I, had a lower population density than the rest of Manhattan.

Between 1970 and 1980, for example, Frederick Douglass Boulevard between 110th Street and 125th Street in central Harlem lost 42% of its population and 23% of its remaining housing stock. By 1987, 65% of the buildings in Harlem were owned by the City of New York, and many had become empty shells, convenient centers for drug dealing and other illegal activity. The lack of habitable buildings and falling population reduced tax rolls and made the neighborhood even less attractive to residential and retail investment.

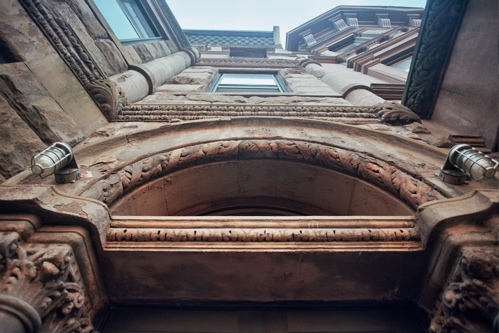
The doorframe of a brownstone designed by William Tuthill in the Mount Morris Historical District in Harlem.

Inadequate housing contributed to racial unrest and health problems. However, the lack of development also preserved buildings from the 1870–1910 building boom, and Harlem as a result has many of the finest original townhouses in New York. This includes work by many significant architects of the day, including McKim, Mead, and White; James Renwick; William Tuthill; Charles Buek; and Francis Kimball.

== 1970–1989 ==
By some measures, the 1970s was the darkest period in Harlem's history. Some Harlemites left the neighborhood in search of safer streets and better schools in the suburbs, those who remained would contribute greatly to local efforts in revitalising the sprawling community despite external efforts to prove otherwise. For example, the federal government's Model Cities Program spent $100 million on job training, health care, education, public safety, sanitation, housing, and other projects over a ten-year period, Harlem showed no improvement. This article shows the ravine between white institutions and the Black community, often filled with ambiguity and racially charged justifications for socially approved negative judgments on and of the latter.

The deterioration shows up starkly in the statistics of the period. In 1968, Harlem's infant mortality rate had been 37 for each 1000 live births, as compared to 23.1 in the city as a whole. Over the next eight years, infant mortality for the city as whole improved to 19, while the rate in Harlem increased to 42.8, more than double. Statistics describing illness, drug addiction, housing quality, and education are similarly grim and typically show rapid deterioration in the 1970s. The wholesale abandonment of housing was so pronounced that between 1976 and 1978 alone, central Harlem lost almost a third of its total population, and east Harlem lost about 27%. The neighborhood no longer had a functioning economy; stores were shuttered and by estimates published in 1971, 60% of the area's economic life depended on the cash flow from the illegal "Numbers game" alone.

The most dangerous part of Harlem was the "Bradhurst section" between Adam Clayton Powell Jr. Boulevard and Edgecombe, from 139th Street through 155th. In 1991, this region was described in the New York Times as follows: "Since 1970, an exodus of residents has left behind the poor, the uneducated, the unemployed. Nearly two-thirds of the households have incomes below $10,000 a year. In a community with one of the highest crime rates in the city, garbage-strewn vacant lots and tumbledown tenements, many of them abandoned and sealed, contribute to the sense of danger and desolation that pervades much of the area."

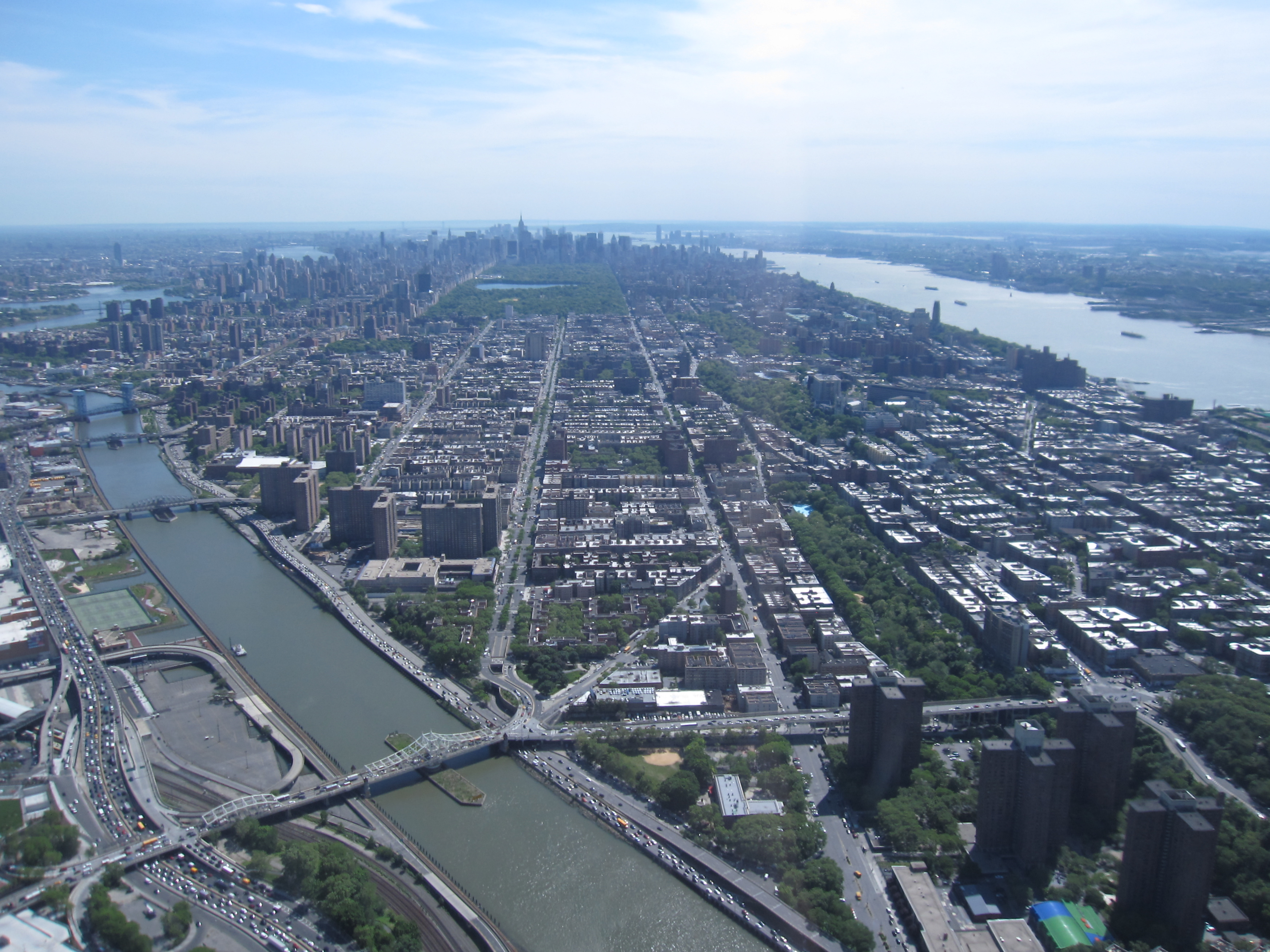
An aerial view of Harlem with river, seen from north (2010)

Plans for rectifying the situation often started with the restoration of 125th Street, long the economic heart of black Harlem. In 1978, Harlem artist Franco the Great began a project on the 125th Street, painting over 200 storefronts to create a positive image of Harlem. However, by the late 1970s, only marginalized and poor retail remained.

Plans were drafted for a "Harlem International Trade Center", which would have filled the entire block between 125th Street and 126th, from Lenox to Adam Clayton Powell Jr. Boulevard, with a center for trade with the third world. A related retail complex was planned to the west, between Frederick Douglass Boulevard and St. Nicholas. However, this plan depended on $30 million in financing from the federal government, and with the election of Ronald Reagan to the presidency of the United States, it had no hope of being completed.

The city did provide one large construction project, though not so favored by residents. Starting in the 1960s and continuing through the 1970s, Harlemites fought the introduction of an immense sewage treatment plant, the North River Water Pollution Control Plant, on the Hudson River in West Harlem. A compromise was ultimately reached in which the plant was built with a state park, including extensive recreational facilities, on top. The park, called Riverbank State Park, was opened in 1993 (the sewage plant having been completed some years earlier).

The city began auctioning its enormous portfolio of Harlem properties to the public in 1985. This was intended to improve the community by placing property in the hands of people who would live in them and maintain them. In many cases, the city would even pay to completely renovate a property before selling it (by lottery) below market value. The program was soon beset by scandal—buyers were acquiring houses from the city, then making deals with churches or other charities in which they would inflate the appraised values of the properties and the church or charity would take out federally guaranteed 203(k) mortgage and buy it.

The original buyer would realize a profit and the church or charity would default on the mortgage (presumably getting some kind of kickback from the developer). Abandoned shells were left to further deteriorate, and about a third of the properties sold by the city were tenements which still had tenants, who were left in particularly miserable conditions. These properties, and new restrictions on Harlem mortgages, bedeviled the area's residential real estate market for years.

== 1990s ==
After four decades of decline, Central Harlem's population bottomed out in the 1990 census, at 101,026. It had decreased by 57% from its peak of 237,468 in 1950. Between 1990 and 2015 the neighborhood's population grew by 16.8%, with the percentage of black people decreasing from 87.6% to 62%, During this time, there was a significant drop to 54.4% in 2010, while the percentage of whites increased from 1.5% to 10% by 2015. Hispanics are the second largest demographic in Central Harlem, making up 23% of the population as of 2015, however, although whites make up only 10% of the population, they are the fastest growing demographic, with a 678% increase since 1990.

From 1987 through 1990, the city removed long-unused trolley tracks from 125th Street, laid new water mains and sewers, installed new sidewalks, curbs, traffic lights, streetlights, and planted trees. Two years later, national chains opened branches on 125th Street for the first time – The Body Shop opened a store at 125th street and 5th Avenue, and a Ben & Jerry's ice cream franchise employing formerly homeless people opened across the street. Neither store is extant. The development of the region would leap forward a few years later with the 1994 introduction of the Upper Manhattan Empowerment Zone, which brought $300 million in development funds and $250 million in tax breaks.

Plans were laid for shopping malls, movie theaters, and museums. However, these plans were nearly derailed by 1995 attack on Freddy's Fashion Mart which killed 8 people. These riots did not resemble their predecessors and were organized by black activists against Jewish shop owners on 125th street.

Five years later, the revitalization of 125th Street resumed, with the construction of a Starbucks outlet backed in part by Magic Johnson (1999), the first supermarket in Harlem in 30 years, the Harlem USA retail complex, which included the first first-run movie theater in many years (2000), and a new home for the Studio Museum in Harlem (2001). In the same year, former president Bill Clinton took office space in Harlem, at 55 West 125th Street. In 2002, a large retail and office complex called Harlem Center was completed at the corner of Lenox and 125th. There has been extensive new construction and rehabilitation of older buildings in the years since.

After years of false starts, Harlem began to see rapid gentrification in the late 1990s. This was driven by changing federal and city policies, including fierce crime fighting and a concerted effort to develop the retail corridor on 125th Street. The number of housing units in Harlem increased by 14% between 1990 and 2000, and the rate of increase has been much more rapid in recent years. Property values in Central Harlem increased nearly 300% during the 1990s, while the rest of New York City saw only a 12% increase. Even empty shells of buildings in the neighborhood were routinely selling for nearly $1,000,000 each as of 2007.

== 2000-present ==
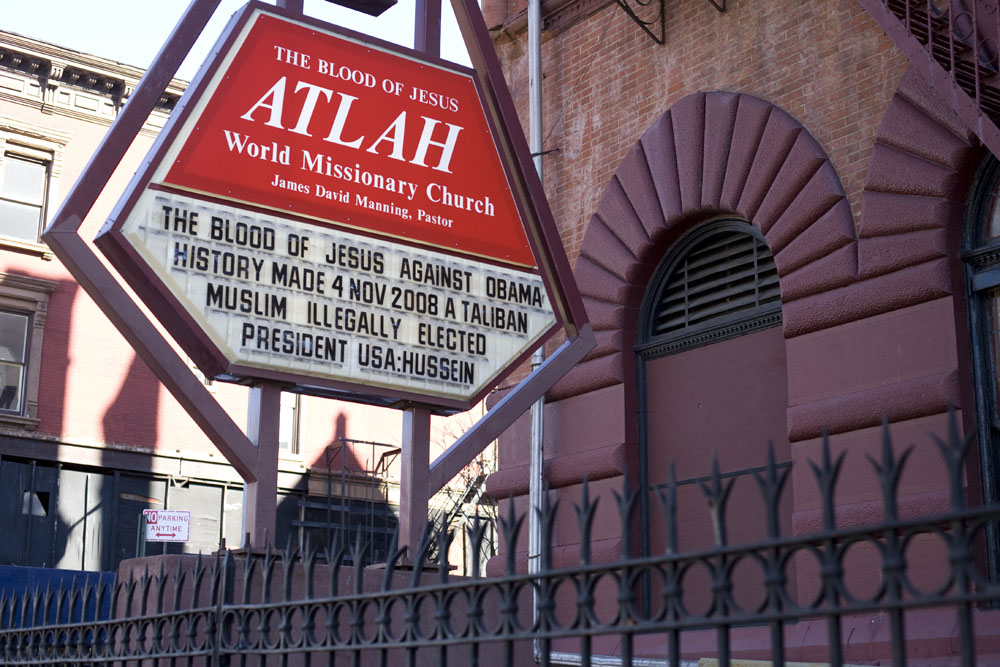
A sign disparaging Barack Obama outside the Atlah World Missionary Church in the former Harlem Club at 123rd Street and Lenox Avenue

In January 2010, The New York Times reported that in "Greater Harlem", which they defined as running from the East River to the Hudson River, from 96th Street to 155th Street, Black people ceased to be a majority of the population in 1998, with the change largely attributable to the rapid arrival of new white and Hispanic residents. The paper reported that the population of the area had grown more since 2000 than in any decade since the 1940s. Median housing prices dropped farther in Harlem than in the rest of Manhattan during the real estate crash of 2008, but recovered more rapidly as well.

The neighborhood's changes have provoked some discontent. James David Manning, pastor of the ATLAH World Missionary Church on Lenox Avenue, has received press for declaring a boycott on all Harlem shops, restaurants, other businesses, and churches other than his own. He believes that this will cause an economic crash that will drive out white residents and drop property values to a level his supporters can afford. There have been rallies against gentrification.

In recent decades, Harlem, particularly Central Harlem, has been a destination for immigrants from West Africa, particularly Senegal, with a stretch of 116th known as Le Petit Sénégal.

On March 12, 2014, two buildings in East Harlem were destroyed in a gas explosion. By the mid-2010s, Harlem was less than 40% Black, and the white and Asian population was increasing greatly. The COVID-19 pandemic in New York City, in 2020, resulted in an influx of white residents from Midtown

== Bibliography ==
- Paterson, David Black, Blind, & In Charge: A Story of Visionary Leadership and Overcoming Adversity. New York, New York, 2020
- John C. Walker,The Harlem Fox: J. Raymond Jones at Tammany 1920:1970, New York: State University New York Press, 1989.
- David N. Dinkins, A Mayor's Life: Governing New York's Gorgeous Mosaic, PublicAffairs Books, 2013
- Rangel, Charles B.; Wynter, Leon (2007). And I Haven't Had a Bad Day Since: From the Streets of Harlem to the Halls of Congress. New York: St. Martin's Press.
- Baker Motley, Constance Equal Justice Under The Law: An Autobiography, New York: Farrar, Straus, and Giroux, 1998.
- Jack, Hulan Fifty Years a Democrat:The Autobiography of Hulan Jack New Benjamin Franklin House New York, NY 1983
- Clayton-Powell, Adam Adam by Adam:The Autobiography of Adam Clayton Powell Jr. New York, New York 1972
- Pritchett, Wendell E. Robert Clifton Weaver and the American City: The Life and Times of an Urban Reformer Chicago: University of Chicago Press 2008
- Davis, Benjamin Communist Councilman from Harlem:Autobiographical Notes Written in a Federal Penitentiary New York, New York 1969

== Cited sources ==
- Gill, Jonathan (2011). Harlem: The Four Hundred Year History from Dutch Village to Capital of Black America. Grove/Atlantic.
- Stern, Robert A. M.; Fishman, David; Tilove, Jacob (2006). New York 2000: Architecture and Urbanism Between the Bicentennial and the Millennium (2000 ed.). New York: Monacelli Press. ISBN 978-1-58093-177-9.
