= Harlem riot =

Harlem riot may refer to:

- Harlem riot of 1935, trouble that began after rumors circulated that a young child had been severely beaten by a shopkeeper
- Harlem riot of 1943, disturbances that began after an NYPD policeman shot and wounded a black U.S. Army soldier
- Harlem riot of 1964, six days of civil disorder that occurred after an African-American teenager was shot and killed by an NYPD lieutenant
