= Marxian =

Marxian is a term generally used to refer to things related to Karl Marx other than Marxism. It may refer to:

- Marxian economics
- Marxian class theory

== See also ==
- Marxism, which is usually referred to as "Marxist", rather than "Marxian"
