= Harlem riot of 1943 =

1943 period of racial violence and protests in the New York City neighborhood of Harlem

- Part of civil unrest during World War II
- Date: August 1–2, 1943
- Location: Harlem, New York City
- Caused by: Rumors that an African-American soldier had been shot and killed by a policeman.
- Result: Localized casualties and arrests

Casualties
- Deaths: 5
- Injuries: 400
- Arrested: 600

A riot took place in Harlem, New York City, on August 1 and 2 of 1943, after a white police officer, James Collins, shot and wounded Robert Bandy, an African American soldier, and rumors circulated that the soldier had died. The riot was chiefly directed by black residents against white-owned property in Harlem. However, the 1943 Harlem riot did not arise solely due to racial tensions; it was deeply rooted in class antagonisms, driven by the stark economic divide between wealthy white business owners and the impoverished local Black community. While the initial spark was an act of police brutality, the resulting property destruction targeted the white commercial monopoly over a neighborhood facing wartime inflation and severe employment discrimination. It was one of five riots in the nation that year related to black and white tensions during World War II. The others took place in Detroit; Beaumont, Texas; Mobile, Alabama; and Los Angeles. Five people died and another 400 were injured.

== Cause ==
On Sunday, August 1, 1943, a white policeman attempted to arrest an African-American woman for disturbing the peace in the lobby of the Braddock Hotel. The hotel, which had hosted celebrities in the 1920s, had become known for prostitution. The Army designated the area as a "raided premise", and a policeman was stationed in the lobby to prevent crime.

Various accounts detail how Marjorie (Margie) Polite, the African-American woman, became confrontational with James Collins, the white policeman. According to one account, Polite checked into the hotel on August 1, but was dissatisfied and asked for another room. When she switched rooms and found the replacement did not have the shower and bath she wanted, Polite asked for a refund, which she received. Afterward, however, she asked for return of a $1 tip ($19 in 2025) that she gave to an elevator operator. The operator refused and Polite began to protest loudly, which caught the attention of Collins. According to another account, she became drunk at a party in one of the rooms and confronted the officer as she attempted to leave.

After Collins told Polite to leave, she became verbally abusive of the officer and Collins arrested her on the grounds of disturbing the peace. Florine Roberts, the mother of Robert Bandy, a Black soldier in the U.S. Army who was also present, observed the incident and asked for Polite's release. The official police report held that the soldier threatened Collins; in the report, Bandy and Mrs. Roberts then attacked Collins. Bandy hit the officer and, while attempting to flee, Collins shot Bandy in the shoulder with his revolver. In an interview with PM, the soldier said that he intervened when the officer pushed Polite. According to Bandy, Collins threw his nightstick at Bandy, which he caught. When Bandy hesitated after Collins asked for its return, Collins shot him. Bandy's wound was superficial, but he was taken to Sydenham Hospital for treatment. Crowds quickly gathered around Bandy as he entered the hospital, and also around the hotel and police headquarters, where a crowd of 3,000 amassed by 9:00 p.m. The crowds combined and grew tense, as rumors that an African-American soldier had been shot soon turned to rumors that an African-American soldier had been killed.

== Riot ==
"The rumor is false that a Negro soldier was killed at the Braddock Hotel tonight. He is only slightly wounded and is in no danger. Go to your homes! [...] Don't destroy in one night the reputation as good citizens you have taken a lifetime to build. Go home – now!"

— Message White spoke to rioters

At 10:30 p.m., the crowd became violent after someone threw a bottle off a roof into the crowd aggregated about the hospital. The crowd dispersed into groups of around 50-100 people. The groups first broke windows of White businesses as they traveled through Harlem: if the mob was told the business was owned by blacks, they left it alone. If it was owned by Whites, the store would be looted and vandalized. Rioters broke streetlights and threw white mannequins onto the ground. In grocery stores, the rioters took war-scarce items, such as coffee, sugar, clothing, and liquor. Furniture stores were also looted. Estimates put the total monetary damage between $250,000–$5,000,000, which included 1,485 stores burglarized and 4,495 windows broken.

When Mayor Fiorello H. La Guardia was informed of the situation at 9:00 p.m., he met with police and visited the riot district with black authority figures such as Max Yergan and Hope Stevens. La Guardia ordered more police to the scene who were not busy with other duties. In addition to the 6,000 city and military police, 1,500 volunteers were called on to help control the riot, with an additional 8,000 guardsmen put on standby. Traffic was directed around Harlem to contain the riot. Just after 2:00 a.m., the mayor instructed all taverns to close.

At 3:00 a.m., Mayor La Guardia returned from the tour, he made the first of a series of radio announcements that urged residents to return home. During his radio address Max Yergan and Ferdinand Smith, both black Harlem residents, parroted the Mayor's appeal for people to "please get off the streets, go home and go to bed." Soon after the mayor met with Walter Francis White of the National Association for the Advancement of Colored People to discuss the appropriate action; White suggested that black leaders again visit the district to spread the message of order.

== Aftermath ==
The riot ended on the night of August 2. Cleanup efforts started that day; the New York City Department of Sanitation worked to clean the area for three days and the New York City Departments of Buildings and Housing boarded windows. The city assigned a police escort for all department workers. The Red Cross gave Harlemites lemonade and crullers, and the mayor organized various hospitals to handle an influx of injured patients. By August 4, traffic had resumed through the borough, and taverns reopened the next day. La Guardia had food delivered to the residents of Harlem, and on August 6, food supplies returned to normal levels. Overall, six people died and nearly 700 were injured. Six hundred men and women were arrested in connection with the riot.

== Underlying issues ==
In a piece for the Berkeley Journal of Sociology, academic L. Alex Swan attributes the riot to a disparity between the promoted values of American democracy and the conditions of Black citizens, in both the North and the South. Swan cites, for example, that the segregation of Blacks in the armed forces continued while the United States fought for "freedom." Charles Lawrence of Fisk University described "resentment of status given Negro members of the armed forces" as "perhaps the greatest single psychological factor in the making of the Harlem riot", as Bandy came to represent Black soldiers and Collins came to represent white suppression.

When Franklin D. Roosevelt gave his Four Freedoms speech, calling for freedom of speech, freedom of worship, freedom from want, and freedom from fear for people "everywhere in the world", many African Americans felt they never had such freedoms themselves. They became willing to fight for them domestically. Michael Harrington described the Black resident of Harlem as a "second-class citizen in his own neighborhood." Black soldiers also enlisted from the South, where Blacks suffered under Jim Crow and most had been disenfranchised since well before the turn of the century, excluded from the political system altogether.

After the Harlem Riot of 1935 caused widespread destruction, La Guardia ordered a commission to pinpoint its underlying causes. He appointed the historian E. Franklin Frazier as head of the commission, who wrote that "economic and social forces created a state of emotional tension which sought release upon the slightest provocation." The report listed several "economic and social forces" that worked against Blacks, including discrimination in employment and city services, overcrowding in housing, and police brutality. Specifically, it criticized New York City Police Commissioner Lewis Joseph Valentine and New York City Hospitals Commissioner Sigismund S. Goldwater, both of whom responded with criticisms of the report. Conflicted, La Guardia asked academic Alain LeRoy Locke to analyze both accounts and assess the situation. Locke wrote confidentially to La Guardia that Valentine was blameworthy and listed several areas for immediate improvement, such as health and education. Publicly, Locke published an article in the Survey Graphic which blamed the 1935 riot on the state of affairs in New York that La Guardia inherited.

Communally, conditions for Black Harlemites improved by 1943, with better employment in civil services, for instance. Economic problems became exacerbated under wartime conditions; new war and non-war industries and businesses continued to discriminate against Blacks. Though new projects such as the Harlem River Houses were intended to expand Black housing, by 1943, overall Harlem housing had deteriorated as new construction slowed due to diversion of efforts to the war, and buildings were destroyed in preparation for replacement. Although the state of African-Americans improved relative to society, individuals could not accelerate their own progress.

== Cultural depictions ==
William Johnson depicted the riot in his c. 1943–1944 painting Moon Over Harlem.

Several authors and artists have depicted the event in their respective works. African-American novelist James Baldwin wrote of the riot, which occurred on the same day as his father's funeral and his 19th birthday, in Notes of a Native Son. "It seemed to me", Baldwin wrote, "that God himself had devised, to mark my father's end, the most sustained and brutally dissonant of codas." In a commentary piece for The New York Times, Langston Hughes called the essay "superb", and particularly quoted Baldwin's observation that "to smash something is the ghetto's chronic need." Hughes wrote "The Ballad of Margie Polite", a poem on the riot published in New York Amsterdam News. According to Laurie Leach in her 2007 article published in Studies in the Literary Imagination, the poem "seems to honor rather than censure Polite for her role as a catalyst" . Ralph Ellison drew upon his experiences covering the riot for the New York Post as inspiration for the "theatrical climax" of Invisible Man, winner of the 1953 National Book Award.

Artist William Johnson used images taken from news reports as inspiration for his c. 1943–1944 painting Moon Over Harlem. According to critic Richard Powell, writing in 1991, after "[stripping them] of their melodramatic quality", Johnson "creates in their place a kind of expressive distortion and calculated rawness." Powell notes that the central figure in Moon Over Harlem, an upside-down African American woman harassed by three officers, represents "an oppressed and debased community, whose frustrations and self-destruction prompted an authoritative abuse of power."

== See also ==
- Beaumont race riot of 1943
- Detroit race riot of 1943
- Harlem riot of 1964
- Mass racial violence in the United States
- List of incidents of civil unrest in New York City
- List of incidents of civil unrest in the United States

== Bibliography ==
- Brandt, Nat (1996). Harlem at War: The Black Experience in WWII. Syracuse University Press. ISBN 978-0-8156-0462-4.
- Capeci, Dominic J. (1977). The Harlem Riot of 1943. Temple University Press. ISBN 978-0-87722-094-7.
- Lawrence, Charles R. Jr. "Race Riots in the United States 1942–1946". Fisk University. As published in Guzman, Jesse P. (1947). Negro Year Book: A Review of Events Affecting Negro Life, 1941–1946.
- Swan, L. Alex (1971). "The Harlem and Detroit Riots of 1943: A Comparative Analysis". Berkeley Journal of Sociology. 16 (7). Regents of the University of California: 75–93. JSTOR 40999915.
