= Sanquirico =

Sanquirico is an Italian surname. Notable people with the surname include:

- Alessandro Sanquirico (1777–1849), Italian scenic designer, architect and painter
- Pio Sanquirico (1847–1900), Italian painter
