= Puricelli =

Puricelli is an Italian surname. Notable people with the surname include:

- Arturo Puricelli (born 1947), Argentine lawyer
- Eduard Puricelli (1826–1893), German industrialist and politician
- Ettore Puricelli (1916–2001), Italian footballer
- Giuseppe Puricelli (1825–1894), Italian painter
- Julien Puricelli (born 1981), French rugby union player
- Maríano Puricelli (born 1974), Argentine alpine skier
