= Marx's theory of class =

Theory developed by Karl Marx

Marx's theory of class is a central element of Marxist thought, referring to the social stratification and conflict that Karl Marx and Friedrich Engels argued was a defining feature of human history and particularly acute under capitalism. For Marx, a class is a group of people defined by their relationship to the means of production—the facilities, tools, land, and resources by which a society's goods are produced. He posited that the history of class society (that is all society in which classes and a structure of class have existed) is fundamentally a story of class conflict, in which the ruling class, which owns and controls the means of production, exploits the subordinate classes who do not.

In capitalist society, Marx identified two primary classes: the bourgeoisie (the capitalist class), which owns the means of production, and the much larger proletariat (the working class), which must sell its own labor power to survive. This relationship is inherently exploitative, as the capitalists extract surplus value from the workers' labor. This economic antagonism is the root of class struggle, which, in Marx's view, would eventually culminate in a proletarian revolution. He saw the proletariat as a unique "special class" whose historical conditions and interests would lead it not only to overthrow the bourgeoisie but to abolish all class distinctions and create a classless society.

Marx's analysis also accounted for other classes and strata, such as the petty-bourgeoisie (small business owners and professionals), the peasantry, and the lumpenproletariat (the declassed and socially marginal). He viewed these groups as transitional or intermediate, often politically unstable and ultimately subordinate to the main conflict between the bourgeoisie and proletariat. A key principle of his political theory was the self-emancipation of the working class, arguing that the proletariat must achieve its own liberation through its own organized struggle, rather than being freed by benevolent saviors or elite groups.

== Fundamental concepts ==
=== Definition of class ===
Karl Marx

According to Hal Draper, Karl Marx never provided a complete definition of "class" in a single, dedicated text, but his understanding is consistently demonstrated throughout his work. For Marx, class is not determined by income, occupation, or social status, but by a group's relationship to the means of production. In any given society, the key distinction is between those who own the means of producing wealth and those who do not. The owning class constitutes the ruling class, while the others are the exploited classes. This division is not a static sociological category but a dynamic social relationship rooted in the production process. The specific form of this relationship defines the economic and political character of each historical epoch. In capitalism, for example, the defining relationship is between the wage-worker and the employer of labor power, a relationship that presupposes a class of owners and a class of propertyless workers.

Marx's definition of class under capitalism is rooted in a two-fold separation inherent to its mode of production. The first is the separation between the units of production, where social production is coupled with private appropriation. Individual enterprises, though interdependent parts of a social production system, are privately owned, and their products are commodities to be sold on the market. The second, more fundamental separation is that of the "direct producers" from the means of production. This historical expropriation creates a class of propertyless workers who are compelled to sell their labor power to the capitalist class in exchange for a wage, a relationship which is continually reproduced by the workings of the capitalist system.

Marx distinguished between a "class in itself" (Klasse an sich) and a "class for itself" (Klasse für sich). A "class in itself" is a group that shares a common relationship to the means of production but lacks a collective consciousness of its shared interests or role. It becomes a "class for itself" when it achieves political organization and consciousness of its position and historical goals. This transformation, Marx argued, occurs through the process of class struggle.

=== Class struggle and revolution ===
Marx's theory posits that "the history of all hitherto existing society is the history of class struggles". This ongoing conflict between exploiting and exploited classes is the primary engine of historical change. Marx distinguished between a political revolution and a social revolution. A political revolution alters the governmental structure or transfers power between factions of the same ruling class. A social revolution, however, is a more fundamental transformation involving the transfer of state power to a new class, which then remodels society according to its own interests and establishes a new mode of production.

The class that takes power must, in its first moments, conquer political power in order to represent its interest as the general interest. The ultimate goal of the proletarian revolution is the creation of a classless society. By overthrowing the bourgeoisie, the proletariat would "sweep away the conditions for the existence of class antagonisms and of classes generally, and will thereby have abolished its own supremacy as a class." For Marx, the defining tenet of his theory was this practice of proletarian revolution and the theory and practice of class power.

=== Class and political representation ===
While Marx's foundational analysis defined classes by their economic position, his treatment of how these classes act in the political sphere is more complex and evolved over his career. This is particularly evident when comparing his earlier and later works. In the Communist Manifesto, written at a time of revolutionary optimism, Marx and Friedrich Engels present a model of escalating class polarization, where society "is more and more splitting up into two great hostile camps": the bourgeoisie and the proletariat. In this model, the economic classes themselves are expected to become the direct political actors as the proletariat organizes into a political party to pursue its own interests. The Manifesto identifies several historical tendencies that would drive this process, including the de-skilling of labor, the concentration of workers in factories, the increasing precarity of their existence, and the downward social mobility of the petty-bourgeoisie.

However, in later works like The Eighteenth Brumaire of Louis Bonaparte, which analyzes the complex class struggles in France after 1848, Marx's model becomes more nuanced. Here, the idea of classes acting directly as monolithic political forces is replaced by the more complex concept of political "representation". The political forces active in the struggle—parties, parliamentary factions, military leaders, and literary figures—are seen as representing the interests of various social classes. This relationship is not straightforward; a political group may represent a class without its members being drawn from that class, and the class itself may not consciously support its representatives. For example, Marx's analysis of Louis-Napoléon Bonaparte's rise to power shows him representing the atomized, conservative small-holding peasantry, a class incapable of representing itself and therefore requiring an external authority to act in its name. This analysis highlights the possibility of radical dislocation between a class and its political representatives, such as when the French bourgeoisie, fearing disorder, "condemned the parliamentary struggle of [its own representatives] as a disturbance of order". The concept of representation in Marx's work is thus not a simple mechanism of expression but rather marks the site of a complex, often contradictory, relationship between economic classes and political actors.

== Classes in capitalist society ==
In capitalist society, Marx identified two main, antagonistic classes defined by their relationship to the means of production. These are the bourgeoisie (the owners) and the proletariat (the workers). He also analyzed several other classes and social strata that occupied intermediate or marginal positions in the social structure.

=== Bourgeoisie ===
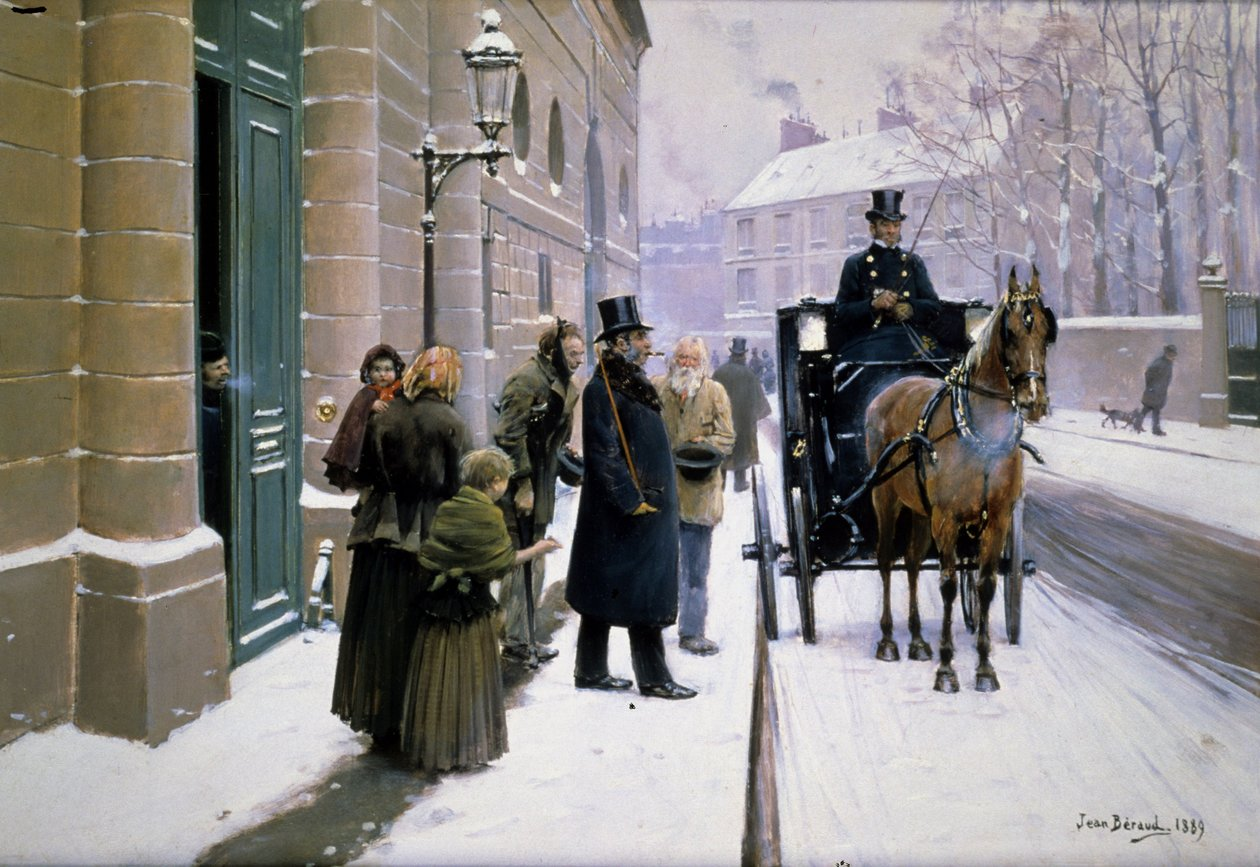
Departure of the Bourgeois (1889) by Jean Béraud

The bourgeoisie, or capitalist class, is the class that owns the means of production and employs wage labor. Historically, the bourgeoisie played a revolutionary role by overthrowing the feudal system and developing industrial capitalism, which enormously expanded humanity's productive forces. However, in Marx's analysis of the 1848 revolutions, he concluded that the bourgeoisie, particularly in Germany, had become a counter-revolutionary force. Fearing the rise of the proletariat more than it desired to complete its own democratic revolution against absolutist remnants, the bourgeoisie preferred to compromise with the old order.

This "thesis of incapacity" became a central part of Marx's theory: that the latter-day bourgeoisie was no longer capable of carrying out a consistent democratic revolution, a task that would now fall to the proletariat and its allies. Marx argued that as the bourgeoisie develops industry, it simultaneously produces its own "gravediggers"—the proletariat. A "turning-point" is reached where the bourgeoisie's fear of the proletariat's political power outweighs its drive for further expansion, making it a reactionary class.

=== Proletariat ===
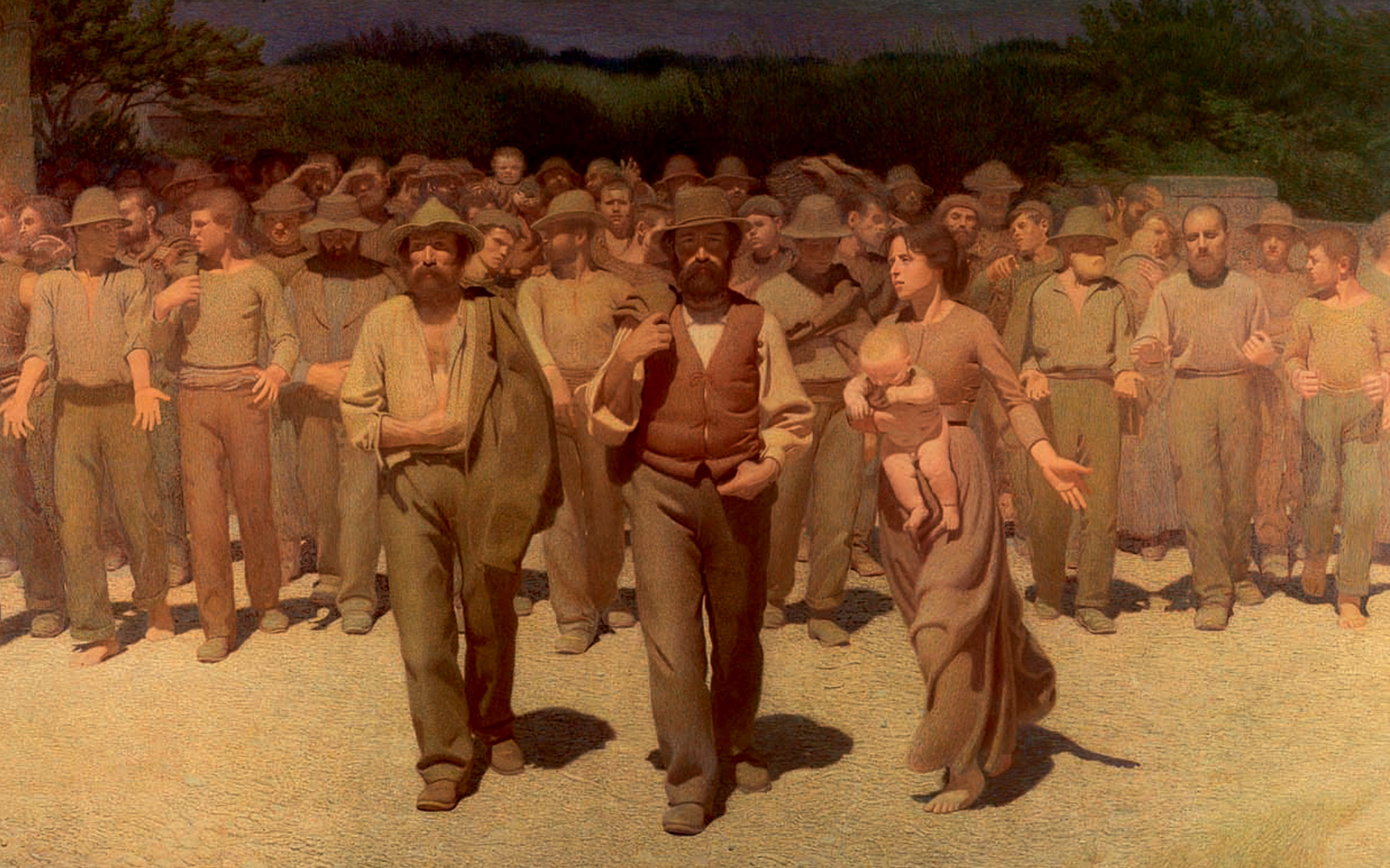
The Fourth Estate (1901) by Giuseppe Pellizza da Volpedo

The proletariat is the class of wage workers who lack ownership of the means of production and are compelled to sell their labor power to survive.

==== Economic definition ====
In Marx's economic theory, the proletariat encompasses all wage–workers who lack ownership of the means of production and are compelled to sell their labor power to survive. While Marx distinguished between productive and unproductive labor, his concept of the "collective laborer" (Gesamtarbeiter) encompasses all workers whose labor contributes to the production of a commodity, including those involved in intellectual, supervisory, or transport roles. An editor, for example, is as much a part of this collective as a shipfitter. In his broader political writings, however, Marx often used "proletariat", "workers", or "working class" to denote this core class and its penumbra of other wage-workers. Furthermore, in Volume III of Capital, Marx clarifies that wage-workers in the sphere of circulation—such as commercial workers—are also part of the proletariat. Although their labor does not directly create surplus value, they sell their labor power, own no means of production, and perform unpaid surplus labor that enables the commercial capitalist to realize profit. Additionally, marx includes the unemployed as part of the proletariat, referring to them as the 'industrial reserve army' who likewise lack the means of production and remain dependent on selling their labor power.

==== The "special class" ====
Marx and Engels saw the proletariat as the uniquely revolutionary class of the modern era, for several historical reasons:

1. Propensity to organize: The conditions of industrial production bring workers together in large numbers, teaching them discipline and cooperation. Capitalism itself "assembles the bourgeois and the proletarians", compelling the working class to organize.
2. Interests aligned with struggle: The proletariat's basic economic and social needs are systematically frustrated by capitalism. The struggle to defend its interests as a class compels it to challenge the foundations of the system.
3. Tendency toward anti-bourgeois institutions: The organized struggle of the working class inherently pushes against the rights of private property, as it insists on social responsibility for all vital aspects of life, from wages and working conditions to health and education.
4. Capacity for militancy: The proletariat's conditions of existence, as a class alienated from the products of its labor and the means of production, push it toward a persistent boldness and militancy at critical stages of struggle.
5. Social weight and strategic position: The proletariat is the only class with the collective power to halt and reorganize production, as it is at the "levers of economic power".
6. Embodies a social program: The proletariat's class position objectively points to a program that resolves the contradictions of capitalism: the abolition of private property and the creation of a democratically organized society.

This view was not based on an idealization of workers, whom Marx and Engels often criticized, but on an analysis of the objective role of the proletariat as a class in the process of historical change. The proletariat, as the "lowest stratum of our present society", cannot emancipate itself without emancipating all of humanity.

==== Maturation and "bourgeoisification" ====
Marx saw the proletariat not as a homogeneous whole but as a class that undergoes a process of maturation. This involves overcoming internal divisions, such as competition between workers and antagonisms between different ethnic or national groups (e.g., between English and Irish workers). It also involves a process of "bourgeoisification", which Draper argues Marx and Engels used in two senses. Firstly, it represented a modernizing aspect, as the proletariat evolved out of pre-bourgeois backwardness and became a modern class typical of bourgeois society. Secondly, it had a pejorative meaning, referring to the adoption of bourgeois mentalities and politics. This was particularly evident in England, where the bourgeoisie used its industrial monopoly to create a privileged "labor aristocracy" and mute the class struggle by allowing a section of the working class to "share the feast".

== Other classes and social strata ==
=== Petty-bourgeoisie ===
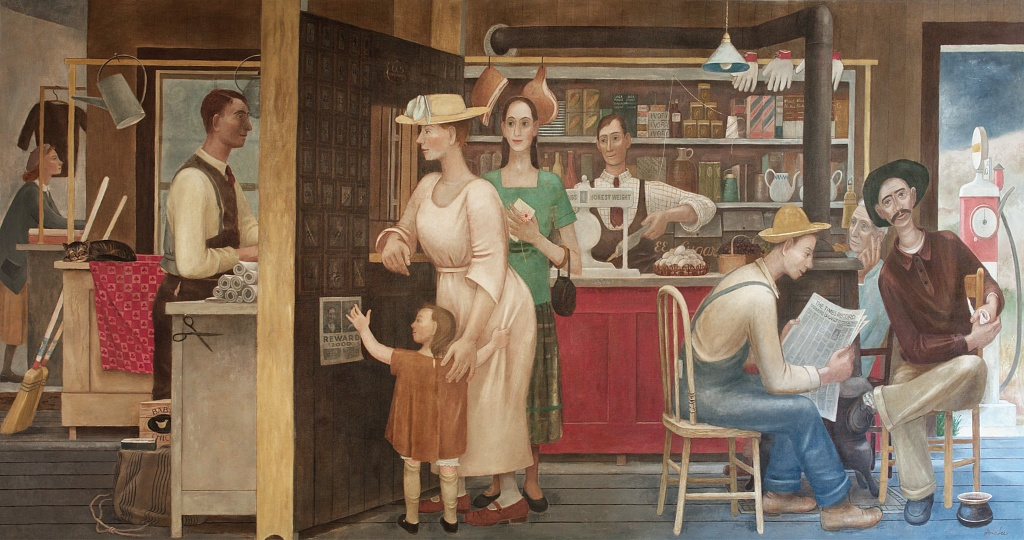
General Store and Post Office (1938) by Doris Lee

The petty-bourgeoisie (or petite bourgeoisie) consists of those who make their living primarily from their own labor with their own self-owned means of production, such as small shopkeepers, self-employed artisans, and peasants. Marx characterized this class as inherently contradictory and politically unstable. Because they are property owners, they share interests with the bourgeoisie; because they are workers who suffer from the pressure of big capital, they share interests with the proletariat.

Draper describes it as a "Janus class" that faces two ways. This duality is reflected in its political behavior, which Marx saw as vacillating and inconsistent. The petty-bourgeoisie is prone to make grand revolutionary threats but shrinks back from decisive action, becoming "boastful, full of big talk" when there is no danger and "faint-hearted, cautious and mealy-mouthed as soon as the slightest danger approaches". While often forming a key component of the democratic movement, Marx and Engels ultimately concluded, after the experience of 1848, that the petty-bourgeois democracy would become the "most dangerous enemy" of the proletariat once it achieved power, as it would seek to halt the revolution at a point that preserved small-scale private property.

Marx's analysis of the political representatives of this class, such as the Montagne in the French National Assembly, clarifies this relationship. He noted that what makes a group of politicians representatives of the petty-bourgeoisie is that "in their minds they do not get beyond the limits which the latter do not get beyond in life". They are driven theoretically to the same problems and solutions to which the material interests of the petty-bourgeoisie drive it practically. This relationship can be fraught, however, as seen in 1849 when the petty-bourgeoisie "betrayed their representatives" by refusing to support their call to arms.

=== Peasantry ===
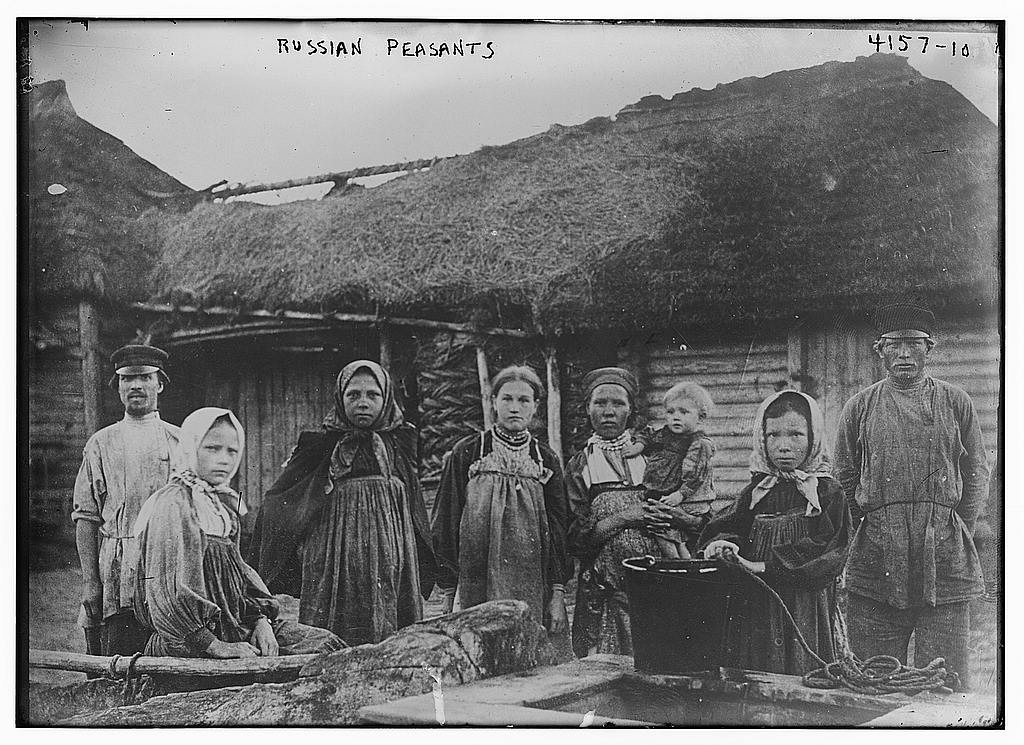
Russian peasants, c. 1910s

The peasantry, as the agrarian sector of the petty-bourgeoisie, holds a particularly important place in Marx's analysis due to its sheer size in most countries during his time. Marx argued that the isolation of peasant life—small-holding peasants living in similar conditions but without extensive relations with one another—prevented them from forming a class "for itself" capable of revolutionary initiative. He described them as a "sack of potatoes" that forms a vast mass but lacks national bonds and political organization.

This atomization makes the peasantry dependent on an external authority and provides a social base for despotism, as exemplified by the rise of Bonapartism in France. However, Marx also qualified this relationship, noting that Bonaparte represented the conservative peasant, who was driven by a superstitious attachment to his small plot, rather than the revolutionary peasant who sought to strike out against the old order. This distinction highlights that even the relationship of representation between a class and a political force is not monolithic and can be subject to internal divisions and struggles. Marx and Engels did not dismiss the peasantry, but saw the small peasants as essential allies for the proletariat. Their policy evolved from an initial negative view in the Communist Manifesto to a sophisticated strategy for a worker-peasant alliance. The key was to support the peasants in their struggle against feudal remnants and large landowners while showing them that their long-term interests lay in the socialization of agriculture, beginning with the formation of cooperatives on confiscated large estates.

=== Lumpenproletariat ===
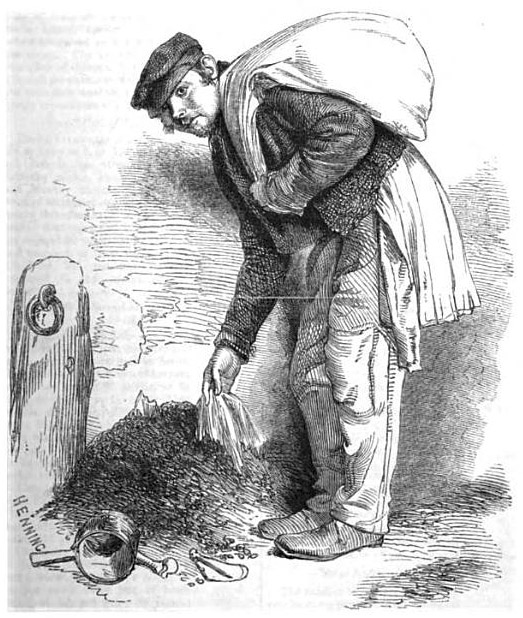
1851 depiction of a London rag-picker

The lumpenproletariat (German for "rag-proletariat") is a class or stratum below the proletariat, consisting of what Marx called the "refuse of all classes". This includes "vagabonds, discharged soldiers, discharged jailbirds, escaped galley slaves, swindlers, mountebanks, lazzaroni, pickpockets, tricksters, gamblers, pimps, brothel keepers, porters, literati, organ-grinders, rag-pickers, knife grinders, tinkers, beggars".

It is a class of declassed, dispossessed, and often criminal elements who are not integrated into the productive process. Marx saw this group as a "dangerous class" and a tool of reaction. Lacking class consciousness and political organization, they are easily bribed and mobilized by the ruling class to act against the revolutionary workers' movement. During the 1848 revolution in France, the bourgeoisie organized young lumpenproletarians into the Mobile Guard to crush the June uprising of the Paris workers. Marx distinguished this class cloaca from the lowest, pauperized layers of the working class (the industrial reserve army), which remained part of the proletariat even when unemployed. The lumpenproletariat proper stands outside the socioeconomic system of production.

=== Intellectuals and mixed-class elements ===
Marx did not develop a formal theory of "intellectuals" as a distinct class. His concern was with the role of "educated people" or the "educated classes", elements who typically came from a bourgeois or petty-bourgeois background and brought specialized skills to the social and political arena.

In general, Marx saw the dominant intellectual stratum as "servants of power"—the "ideological representatives and spokesmen" of the ruling class, whose function is to develop and systematize the illusions that class has about itself. However, he also recognized that in times of revolutionary crisis, a "small section of the ruling class cuts itself adrift, and joins the revolutionary class". These were often "bourgeois ideologists, who have raised themselves to the level of comprehending theoretically the historical movement as a whole."

Within the workers' movement, Marx and Engels viewed the influx of bourgeois intellectuals with a mixture of hope and mistrust. They recognized the movement's need for theoretical and practical skills that workers, due to their lack of education, might not possess. At the same time, they warned that intellectuals often brought with them elitist, reformist, or utopian tendencies, and a propensity to see themselves as the natural leaders of the unenlightened masses. They argued against both the uncritical acceptance of intellectuals and the "proletarian" anti-intellectualism that would exclude them entirely. The solution was to insist that intellectuals who joined the movement must assimilate themselves to the proletarian standpoint and accept the discipline of the class organization.

== Class and revolutionary strategy ==
=== Self-emancipation of the proletariat ===
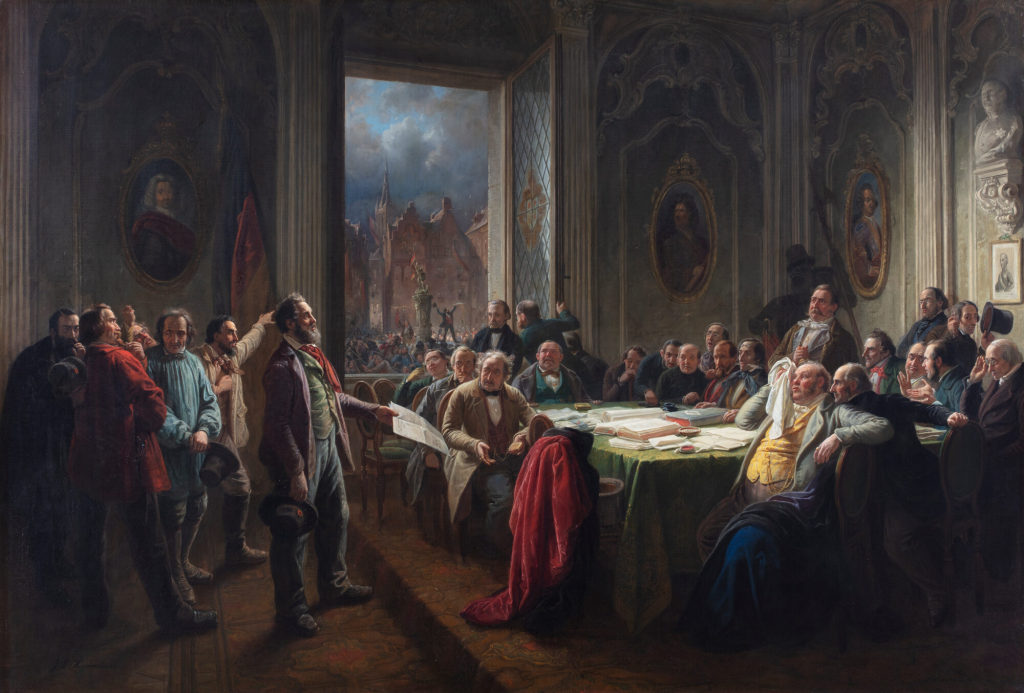
Johann Peter Hasenclever's Arbeiter und Magistrat (Workers and the City Council, 1848). Marx recommended the painting to his readers in 1853 for an insight into the atmosphere of the 1848 revolution, noting the "dramatic interplay" between the workers' delegation and the city council.

A foundational principle of Marx's political thought is "that the emancipation of the working classes must be conquered by the working classes themselves". This principle of class self-emancipation stands in opposition to all forms of "socialism from above", where a new social order is handed down by an elite group, a benevolent dictator, or a group of intellectuals. It is a rejection of the "savior pattern" common in utopian socialism, which saw the masses as a passive flock to be led by a Good Shepherd.

For Marx, the proletariat is not merely a suffering class to be pitied and helped; it is the active agent of its own liberation. This emancipation is a process, not a single event. The working class becomes "fit to rule" only through a "long struggle, through a series of historic processes, transforming circumstances and men." The revolution itself is an educative process: "revolutionary activity changes you as you change conditions."

=== Permanent revolution ===
The theory of permanent revolution (or "revolution in permanence") addresses the course of class struggle in countries where the bourgeois-democratic revolution has not been completed. The term, which Draper traces to the French Revolution, means a revolution that is continuous and uninterrupted, not perpetual.

In the context of the 1848 German revolution, Marx and Engels initially expected the bourgeois revolution to be the immediate prelude to a proletarian revolution. When the bourgeoisie proved unwilling to carry out its own revolution, the concept evolved. The "final version", formulated in the March 1850 Address of the Central Committee to the Communist League, envisioned a strategy where the proletariat would support the petty-bourgeois democracy in overthrowing the absolutist state. However, from the moment of victory, the proletariat would have to maintain its political and organizational independence, push the revolution forward against its new, temporary allies, and make the revolution "permanent until all more or less possessing classes have been forced out of their position of dominance, until the proletariat has conquered state power". The revolution would thereby move uninterruptedly from a democratic stage to a socialist one under the leadership of the proletariat.
