= Project Uplift =

Project Uplift was a major short-term program of the Great Society. It was an experimental anti-poverty program in Harlem, New York in the summer of 1965, intended to prevent the recurrence of the riots that hit the community the summer before.

== Public works program ==
Harlem Youth Opportunities Unlimited (HARYOU), Associated Community Teams (ACT), and the National Urban League were deputized to organize a network of smaller organizations and employ thousands of young Harlemites in a variety of jobs intended, in the short run, to keep them busy and, in the long run, to give them skills and opportunities to break out of poverty.

Young people were employed running a summer camp, planting trees, repairing damaged buildings, and printing a newspaper. The program included a Project Uplift theater program, run by LeRoi Jones, and a dance program.

In the short run, Project Uplift was a success, there were no riots in the summer of 1965. However, the longer-range goals of the project were not met. Organizers did not hope to end poverty in one summer, of course, but if the 1965 pilot project had gone well, it might have been repeated, on larger scale, until it had an impact.

However, the project was organized with very little lead time: plans were written only weeks before the summer started, and proper research was impossible. Plans to plant 1500 trees in Harlem were scuttled, for example, when managers of the project discovered that one should not plant trees during the summer at all. Money was not allocated until June 25 even if the program was to start June 28, which made it impossible to buy supplies in advance. Organizing over 100 agencies to work together was difficult, and the large groups involved fought for credit.
