= Giuseppe Pellizza da Volpedo =

Italian divisionist painter from Piedmont (1868–1907)

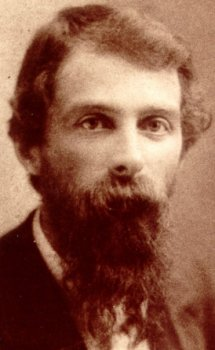
- Born: 28 July 1868; Volpedo, Piedmont, Kingdom of Italy
- Died: 14 June 1907 (aged 38); Volpedo, Piedmont, Italy
- Education: Academy of Brera, Academy of Fine Arts of Florence
- Known for: Painting
- Notable work: The Fourth Estate (1898–1901); Lo specchio della vita (E ciò che l'una fa e l'altre fanno) (1895–1898); Idillio primaverile (1896–1901)
- Style: Neo-impressionism
- Movement: Divisionism; Symbolism; Realism
- Spouse: Teresa Bidone

Giuseppe Pellizza da Volpedo (28 July 1868 – 14 June 1907) was an Italian Divisionist painter. Pellizza was a pupil of Pio Sanquirico. He used a Divisionist technique in which a painting is created by juxtaposing small dots of paint according to a specific colour theory. Although he exhibited often, his work achieved popularity in death through their reproduction in socialist magazines and the acclaim they received from 20th-century art critics.

== Biography ==
Pellizza was born in Volpedo, Italy, on 28 July 1868, to Pietro and Maddalena Cantù and into a wealthy peasant family. He attended the technical school of Castelnuovo Scrivia, where he learned the first elements of drawing. Thanks to the knowledge gained with the commercialization of their products, the Pellizzas contacted the brothers Grubicy, who promoted the enrollment of Giuseppe in the Brera Academy. There, Pellizza was a student of Giuseppe Bertini.

At the same time, he received private lessons from the painter Giuseppe Puricelli, followed by lessons from Pio Sanquirico. He exhibited for the first time in Brera in 1885. Ending his studies in Milan, Pellizza decided to pursue a formative apprenticeship in Rome, at first at the Accademia di San Luca and then at the life drawing school of the French Academy in Rome at the Villa Medici.

Disappointed by Rome, Pellizza abandoned the city before expecting to go to Florence, where he attended its Accademia di Belle Arti as a student of Giovani Fattori. At the end of the academic year, he returned to Volpedo with the aim of dedicating himself to realist painting through the study of nature. Not satisfied with his achieved preparation, he went to Bergamo. There, at the Accademia Carrara, he attended private courses of Cesare Tallone. Then he attended the Accademia Ligustica di Belle Arti in Genoa. At the end of this last apprenticeship, he returned to the region of his birth, where he married a woman from there, Teresa Bidone, in 1892. In the same year, he began to add "da Volpedo" to his signature.

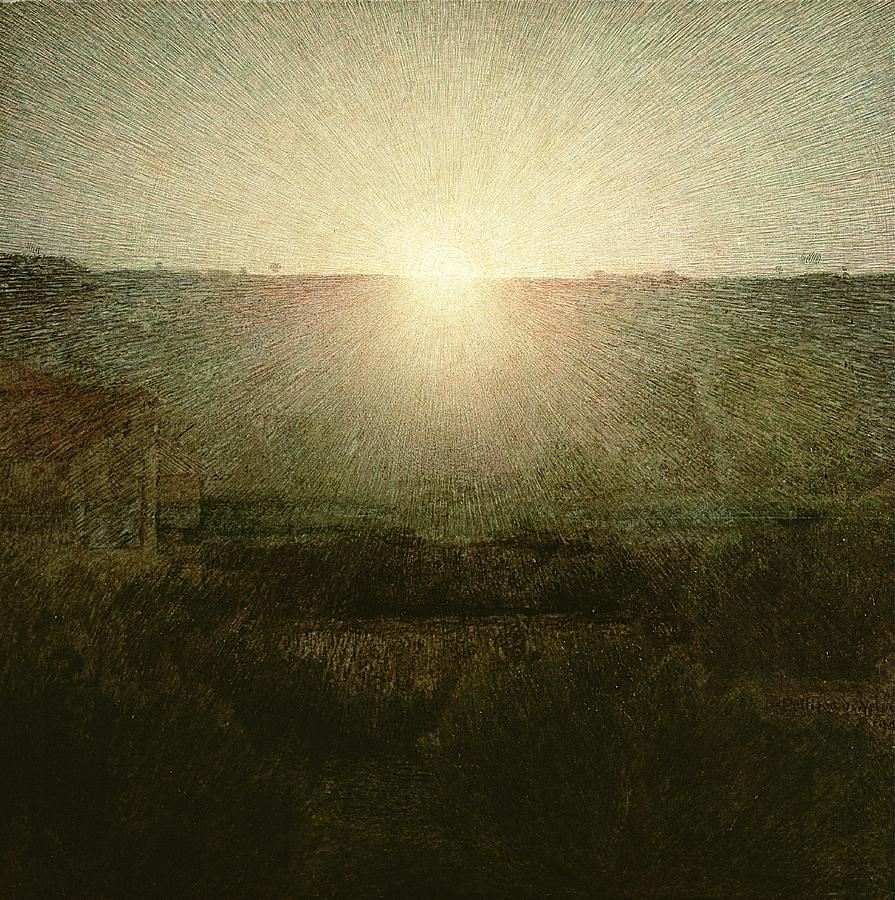
The Sun, oil on canvas, 1904, 150.5 x 150.5 cm. Galleria Nazionale d'Arte Moderna e Contemporanea, Rome

In 1898, he participated in the Esposizione generale italiana in Turin. His pictures in these years progressively abandoned impastoed painting to adopt Divisionism, an artistic technique based on the division of colours through the use of small points and lines. Pellizza was confronted with other paintings that used this technique, above all those of Giovanni Segantini, Angelo Morbelli, Vittore Grubicy de Dragon, Plinio Nomellini, Emilio Longoni and Gaetano Previati. In 1891, he exhibited in the Triennale di Milano to a greater public. He continued his journey throughout Italy at the "Esposizione Italo-Colombiana" in Genoa in 1892 and then a new 1894 exhibition in Milan.

Pellizza returned to Florence in 1893, where he attended the Istituto di Studi Superiori and went on to visit Rome and Naples. In 1900, he exhibited his Lo specchio della vita in Paris, and finished The Fourth Estate, to which he had dedicated ten years of study and work. The Fourth Estate, exhibited the next year in the Quadriennale di Torino, did not achieve the recognition he hoped for, and sparked confusion and criticism from even his friends.

Disappointed, Pellizza gave up contact with many writers and artists whom he had kept up correspondence with. After the death of his friend Giovanni Segantini in 1904, Pellizza took a journey through Engadin, a place dear to Segantini, to reflect on his teacher's motivations and inspirations for painting. In 1906, thanks to the circulation of his works in national and international exhibitions, Pellizza was called to Rome. There he succeeded in selling a painting (Il Sole) to the Italian state. It was kept in the Galleria di Arte Moderna.

It seemed the beginning of a new period of favour, in which finally artistic and literary groups would recognize the themes of his work. However, the sudden death of Pellizza's wife in 1907 threw the artist into a deep depression. On 14 June of the same year, Pellizza hanged himself in his Volpedo studio. He was not yet 40.

== Key works ==
=== The Fourth Estate ===
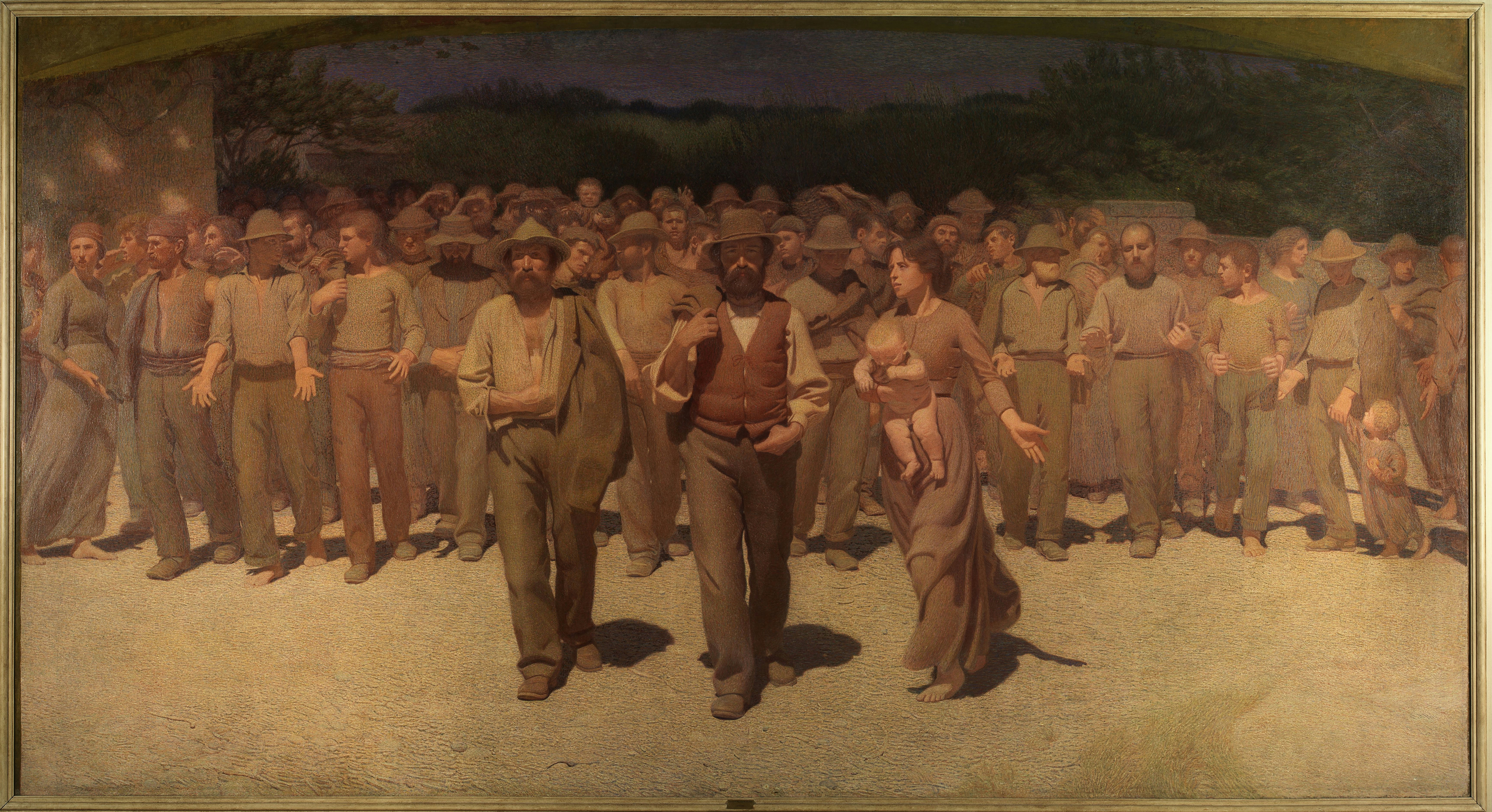
Il Quarto Stato, Museo del Novecento, Milan (1898–1901)

- The Fourth Estate ("Il Quarto Stato") (1901), Pellizza's most famous work, has become a well-known symbol for progressive and socialist causes in Italy, and throughout Europe. The painting is shown during the opening credits of Bernardo Bertolucci's film 1900 and is currently housed at the Museo del Novecento in Milan. An earlier version is held in the Pinacoteca di Brera.
- Fiumana (Pinacoteca di Brera, Milan)
- Ambasciatori della fame (Civica Galleria d'Arte Moderna, Milan)
- Il sole (Galleria Nazionale d'Arte Moderna, Rome)
- Carità cristiana (Pinacoteca Malaspina, Pavia)
- L'amore nella vita (Private collection, Lonedo)
- Il sorgere del sole (Private collection, Turn)
- Panni al sole (Private collection, Milan)
- Passeggiata amorosa (Pinacoteca Civica, Ascoli Piceno)
- Prato fiorito (Galleria Nazionale d'Arte Moderna, Rome)
- Statua a Villa Borghese (Galleria Internazionale d'Arte Moderna, Venice)
- Lo specchio della vita (Museo Civico, Turin)
- L'annegato (Pinacoteca Civica, Alessandria)
- Idillio primaverile (Private collection)
- Il morticino (Museo d'Orsay, Paris)
- Sul fienile (Private collection)
- Christian charity (Pavia Civic Museums)
- Ricordo di un dolore (Ritratto di Santina Negri) (Accademia Carrara, Bergamo)
- La sfinge (Private collection, Volpedo)
- Da Monleale (Museo Studio di Pellizza da Volpedo, Volpedo)

== Gallery ==
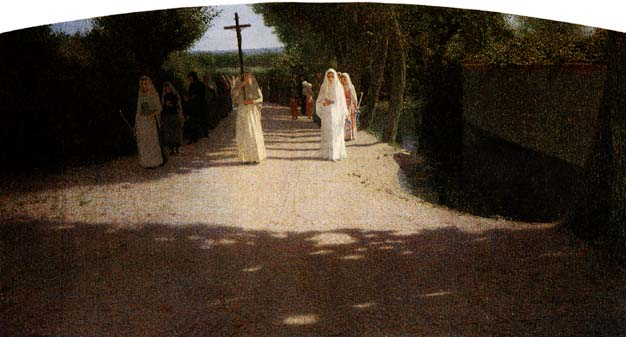
La Processione (The Procession), 1894–1895

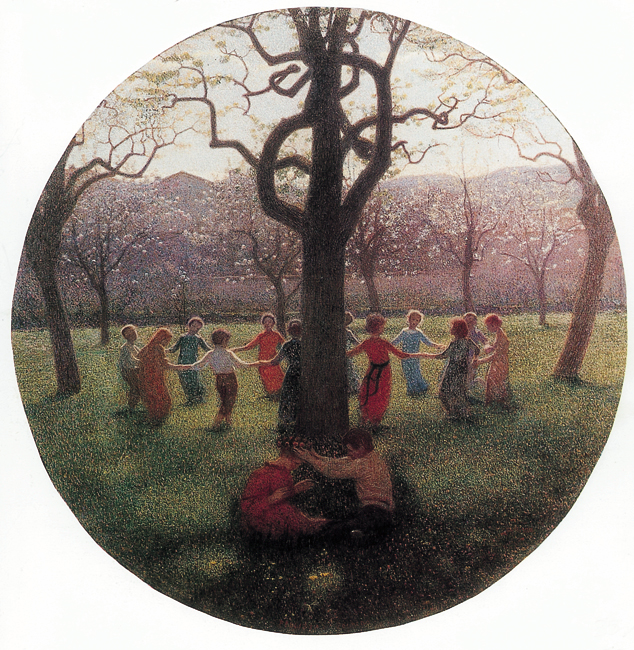
Idillio primaverile (Spring Idyll), 1896–1901

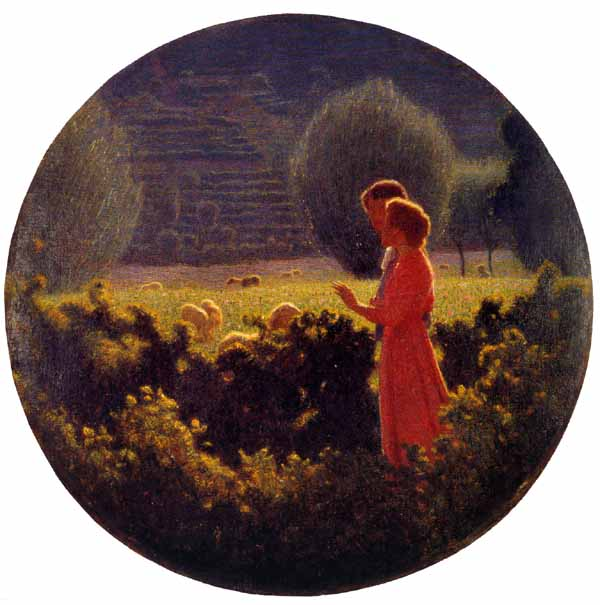
Passeggiata amorosa (Amorous walk), 1901–1902

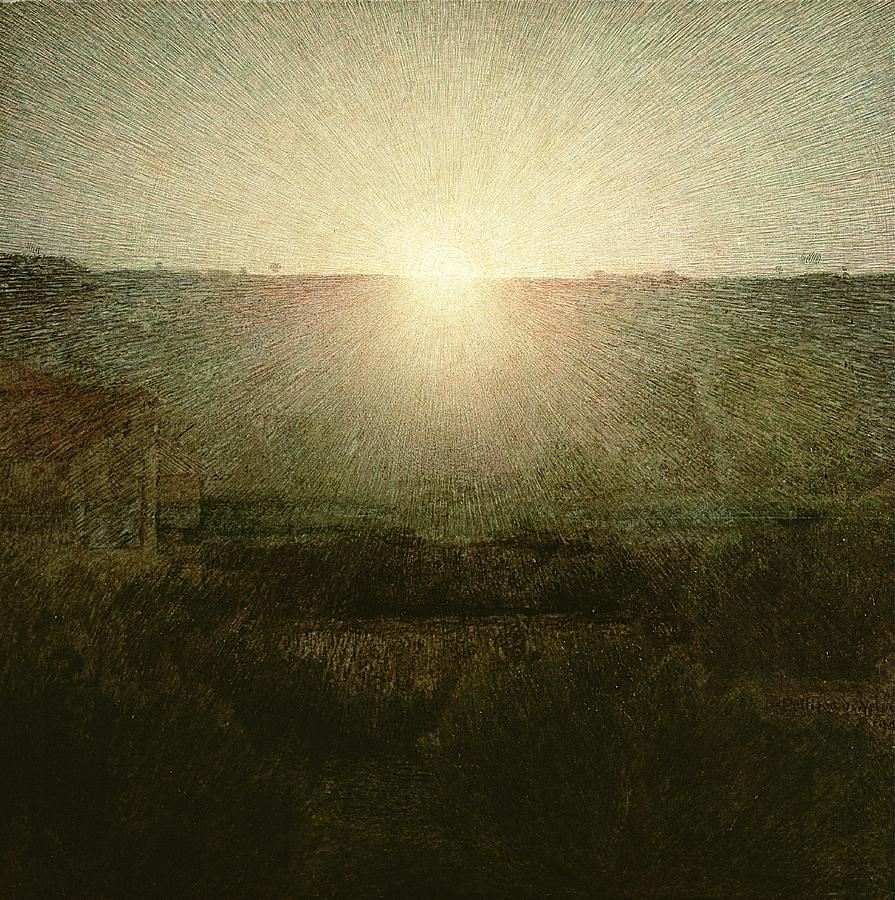
Il Sole (The Sun), 1904
