= Harlem Youth Opportunities Unlimited =

Harlem Youth Opportunities Unlimited, more commonly called HARYOU, was an American social activism organization founded by psychologists Kenneth Clark and Mamie Phipps Clark in 1962. Its director was Cyril deGrasse Tyson, father of astrophysicist Neil deGrasse Tyson, and founding member of the 100 Black Men of America. The group worked to increase opportunities in education and employment for Black youth in Harlem. It also was designed to teach residents of Harlem how to work with governmental agencies to meet their demands.

== History ==
Formed in 1962, HARYOU achieved national prominence quickly. In 1964 the Johnson administration provided $110 million to back educational changes recommended by HARYOU. These plans included recruiting educational experts to reorganize Harlem schools, providing preschool programs and after-school remedial education, and employment programs for dropouts.

After the Harlem riots in the summer of 1964, HARYOU published a report detailing causes of the unrest and recommending solutions. They, together with several other organizations, received federal funding for Project Uplift, intended to prevent riots from happening again.

HARYOU merged with Associated Community Teams (ACT), under the aegis of Congressman Adam Clayton Powell Jr. The combined entity took the name HARYOU-ACT.
