= The Fourth Estate (painting) =

Painting by Giuseppe Pellizza da Volpedo

- Il quarto stato (Italian), El Cuarto Estado (Spanish)
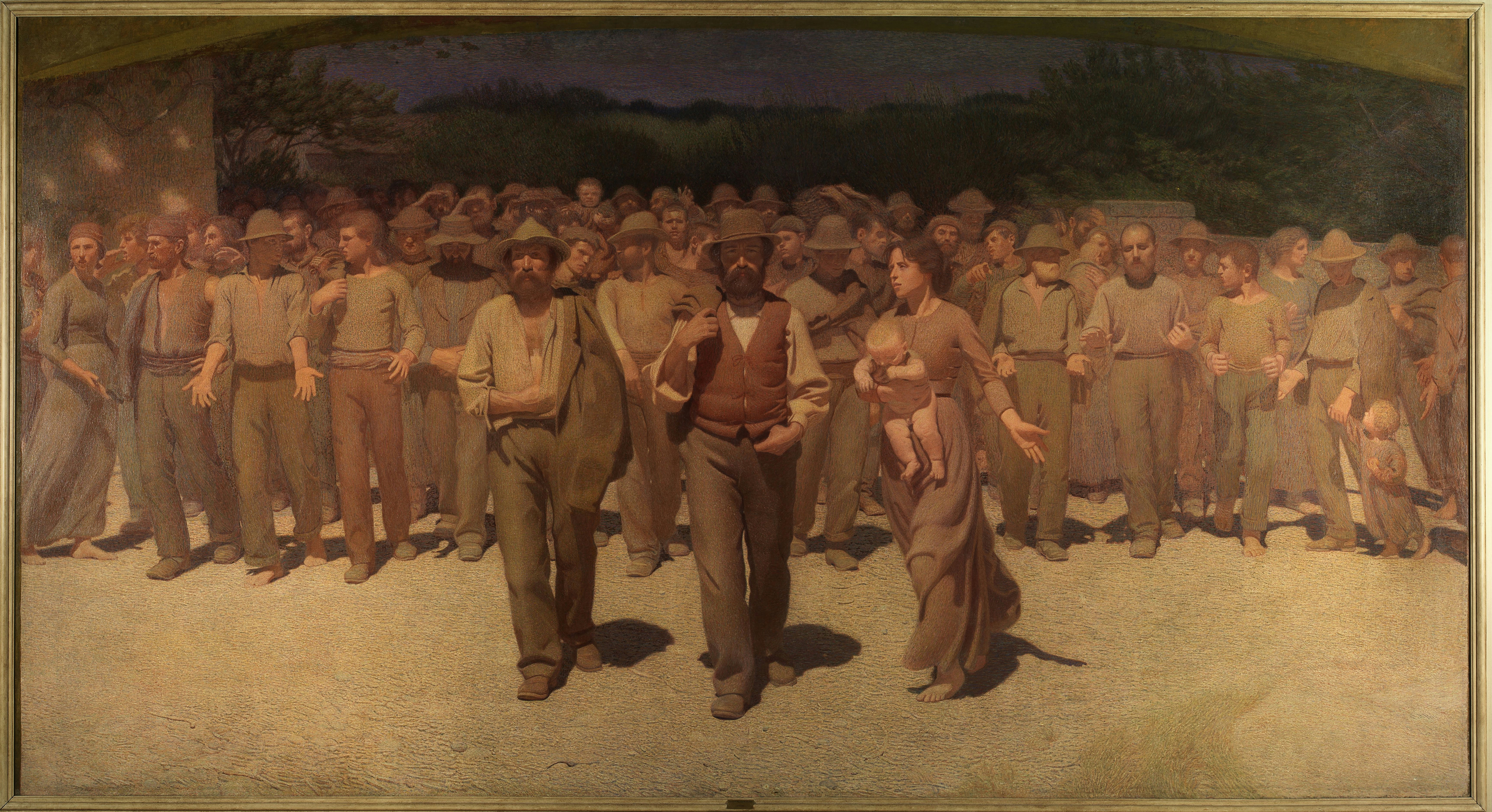
- Artist: Giuseppe Pellizza da Volpedo
- Year: c. 1901
- Type: Oil on canvas
- Dimensions: 293 cm × 545 cm (115 in × 215 in)
- Location: Galleria d'Arte Moderna, Milan

The Fourth Estate (Italian: Il quarto stato) is an oil painting by Giuseppe Pellizza da Volpedo, originally titled The Path of Workers and made between 1898 and 1901. It depicts a moment during a labor strike when workers' representatives calmly and confidently stride out of a crowd to negotiate for the workers' rights. Its name refers to the working class as standing alongside the three traditional estates that divided power between the nobility, clergy, and commoners.

Pellizza made three separate large-scale preliminary versions of the work to experiment with his divisionist representations of color. After his death, The Fourth Estate became a popular Italian socialist image and was reproduced extensively despite its initial shunning by formal art circles. Over time, its acclaim grew until it became recognized as one of the most important Italian paintings of the turn of the 20th century. The painting is now at the Galleria d'Arte Moderna in Milan.

== History ==
=== 1891–1895: Ambasciatori della Fame ===
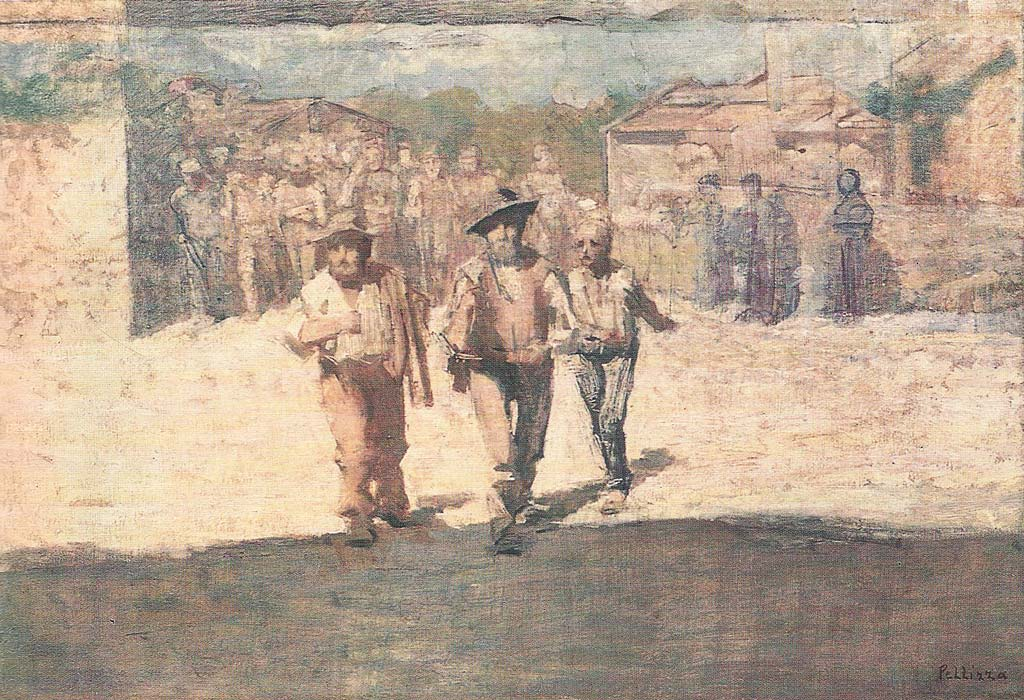
Ambasciatori della Fame was an early version of Fourth Estate

Following the Italian Risorgimento, the peasant and bourgeois classes of the new country had an uncertain relationship. Some bourgeois intellectuals bemoaned the lowering of Italian culture, while artists—particularly the divisionists—brought social themes into their artwork. Giuseppe Pellizza da Volpedo tried to unite the techniques of divisionism with the influence of the farmers' mutual aid society he had joined in his hometown of Volpedo and the socialist writings of the Second International.

Pellizza began to work on a study for Ambasciatori della Fame (Ambassadors of Hunger) in 1891, after participating in a workers' protest in Turin. The scene made such an impression on him that he noted it in his diary:

This social question imposes. Many are dedicated to it and study it swiftly to resolve it. Even art should not be alienated from this movement to a destination that is still unknown but which is understood to be better than present conditions.

The first sketch was completed in April 1891. The subject was a workers' revolt in Piazza Malaspina in Volpedo, with three subjects placed at the front of the protest. The scene is viewed from above, and the figures are distributed on orthogonal lines. This core composition remained in successive versions of the work, each of which presents the three figures in front of a mass of people in the background and a dark backdrop. The shadow stretching out to the ambassador's feet is likely the palazzo on Piazza Malaspina, where the workers are going to make their demands.

Pellizza made numerous other intermediary works between the first drawing of Ambasciatori della Fame and Fiumana. He also made Piazza Malaspina a Volpedo in 1891, which represents the topography of Volpedo as a preparatory background for the subsequent versions. He made two other versions of Ambasciatori della Fame, one dated 1892 and the other 1895. The 1892 sketch is similar to the first. However, Pellizza added a group of women to the 1892 drawing, who are juxtaposed with the male workers.

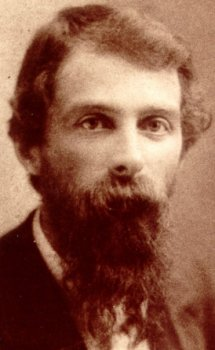
Photograph of Giuseppe Pellizza da Volpedo

The last draft before La Fiumana is the 1895 version of Ambasciatori, created after three quiet years on brown paper as a charcoal and gesso drawing. Pelliza wrote of it:

The ambassadors are two that advance, seriously, across the little piazza toward the noble palazzo that projects the shadow at their feet [...] Hunger advances with its multiple poses—they are men, women, the old, the young: all hungry to go and reclaim that which is their right–serene and calm, at rest, as those who know to ask more or less for what they are owed—they have suffered greatly. The hour of ransom has arrived, so they think, but they do not wish to obtain it with force, but with reason. Someone could raise a fist in an act of menace, but not this crowd, with him. They trust their ambassadors—the intelligent men. [...] A woman hurries to show her emaciated child; another, a third, is trying in vain to breastfeed her child—another shouts curses.

In the passage above, the artist underlined his wish to follow a general theory: not only to represent the citizens of Volpedo, but also an entire part of society that has "suffered greatly" and that intends to claim its rights through a struggle "serene, calm, and reasoned."

=== 1895–1898: La Fiumana ===
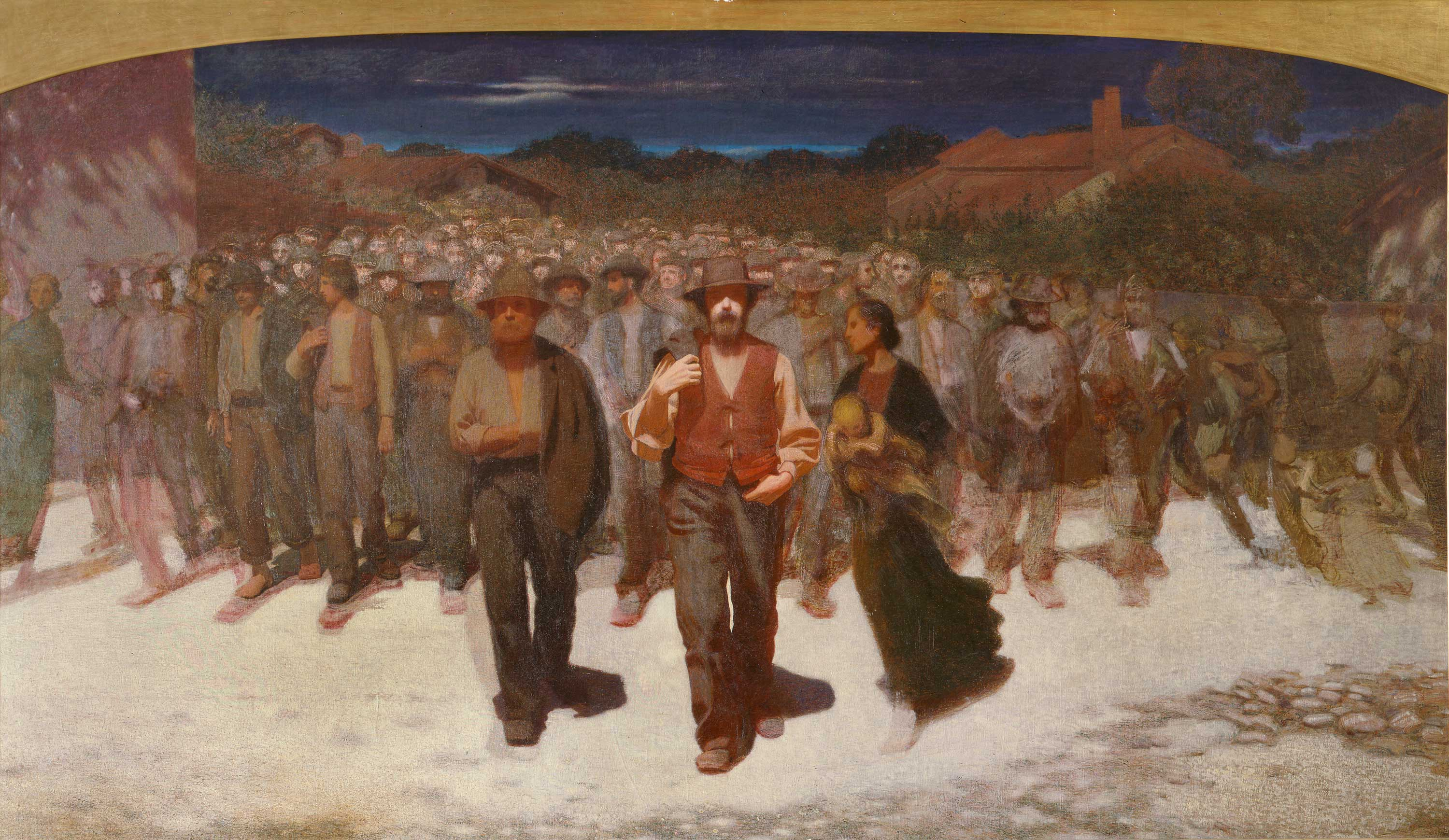
La Fiumana by Giuseppe Pellizza da Volpedo, 1898, oil on canvas, 255 x 438 cm. Palazzo Citterio, Milan.

Pellizza, before painting The Fourth Estate, decided in August 1895 to create a preliminary study in oil. This version, titled La Fiumana ("The River of Humanity"), represented a break from the previous drafts of Ambasciatori della Fame. Compared to them, there are many more people in the crowd and the painting is physically much larger.

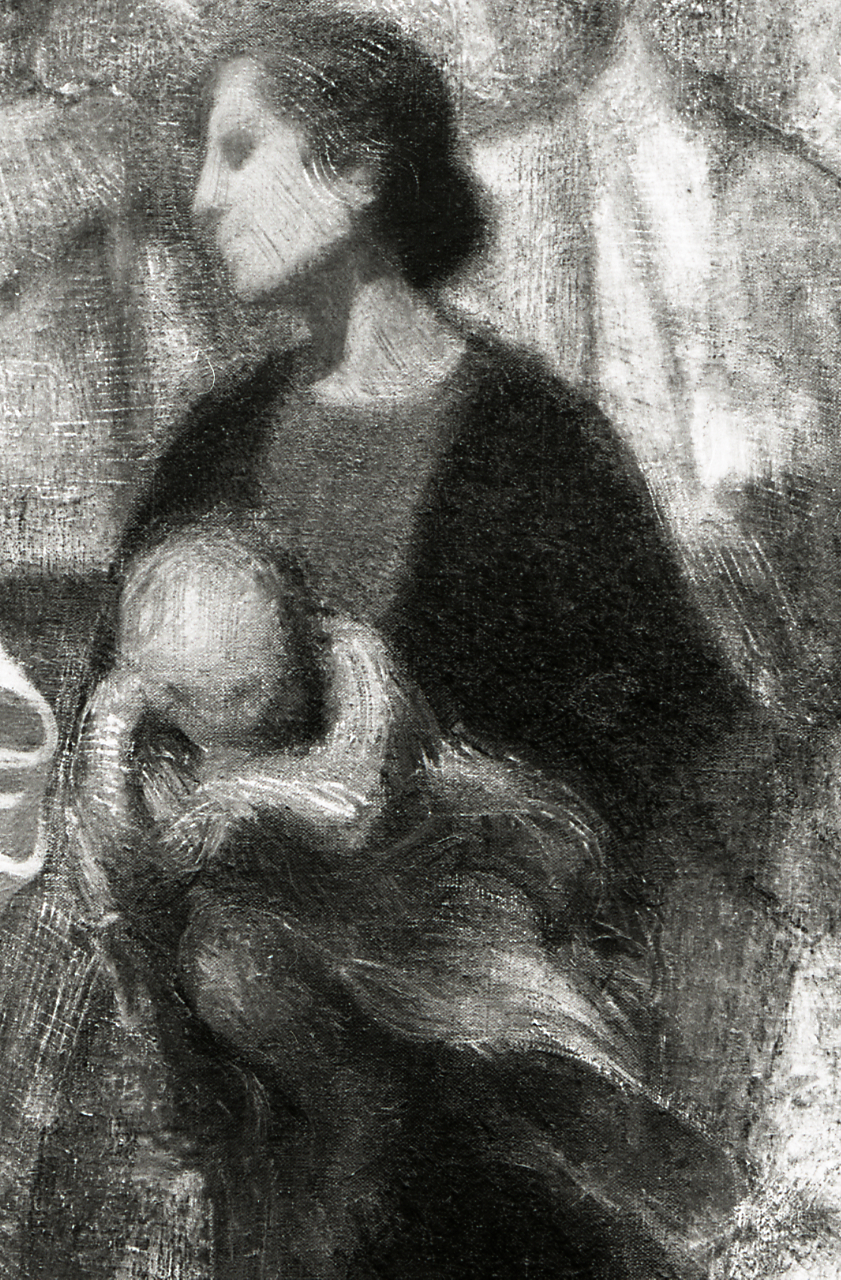
Detail of La Fiumana

Pellizza also used a different range of color in La Fiumana than in earlier versions. This time, he played with "contrasts of yellow and red, with the dominant ones in the earthy, sulfuric figures and the tones of blue to green in the background, where the sky is of a more intense, stronger azure blue and the green of plants is reflected on the ground." The result is a much darker palette, compared to the light tones in Ambasciatori.

The shadow in the front of the earlier versions is no longer present, and the crowd is placed further forward and emphasized with a lower viewpoint. Likewise, the architectural elements have been reduced or removed. The pleading figure at right has been replaced by woman holding a baby in her arms; she stands slightly behind the other two workers and represents the inclusion of women as deserving of workers' rights.

Thanks to the various drawings, preparatory studies, and photographs of the models in pose, Pellizza was able to draft the definitive version of Fiumana in July 1895. The variants multiplied: the countryside underwent changes, while the line of figures in the back was made thinner or set further back, permitting the insertion of more figures. Pellizza's goal was to restore the vitality of a people that were no longer "a natural death, but a living, palpable mass, full of humble hopes or dark menace."

Pellizza tried to give Fiumana a universal scope, exemplified in a poem he wrote on the margin of the canvas:

It is heard ... the River of humanity runs
gently and swells. To remain is a crime.
Philosopher, leave your books to place yourself at its head,
guide it with your studies.
Artist, it brings you with it to ease sadness with
the beauty you know how to present
Worker, leave the bottle which you, for your long labor,
consume
And it brings you with it.
And what do you do? The wife, the child, lead you to
swell
the river of Humanity thirsty
for justice – the justice trampled until now
and now a distant mirage shines.

=== 1898–1901: Il Quarto Stato ===
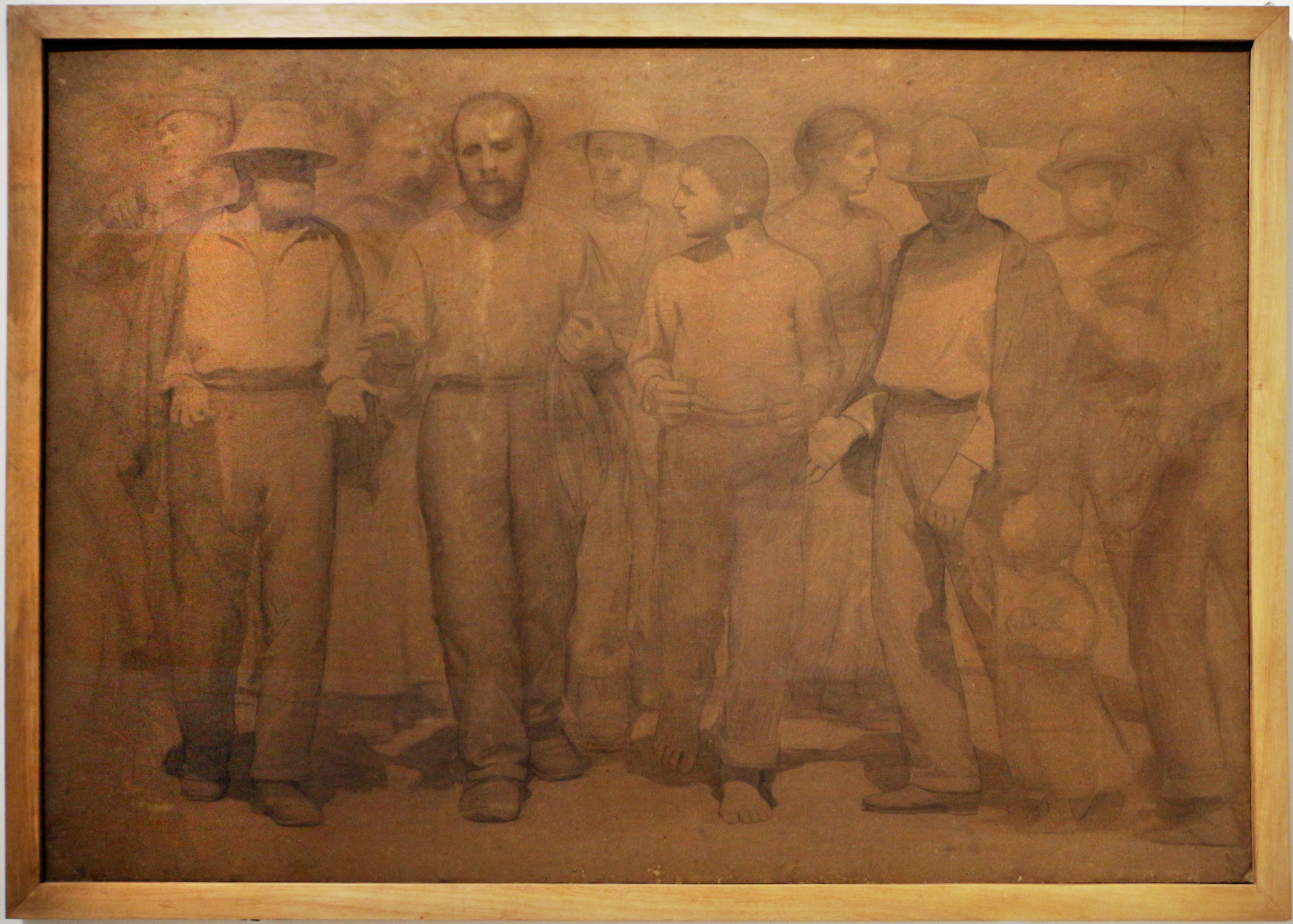
1898–1899 study on paper for Il Quarto Stato

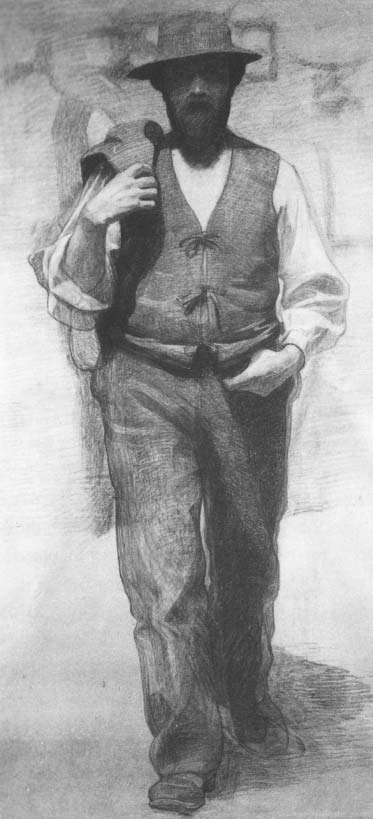
Study of a male figure for Fourth Estate, Pellizza, 1898, charcoal on paper

Dissatisfied with the technical artistic effect of Fiumana but also in light of the brutal Bava Beccaris massacre in Milan, Pellizza decided in 1898 to make the work for a third time on "the greatest manifesto that the Italian proletariat could boast between the 19th and 20th century." His objectives were to render the crowd more tumultuous and impetuous, forming "a wedge towards the observer", and to perfect the chromatic values.

For these reasons, he made a smaller work, Il Cammino dei Lavoratori ("The Path of the Workers"), in 1898. In this preparatory drawing, he gave greater relief to the gestures of the workers, enriching their realism. For example, the woman worker in the front now gestures with her left hand, whereas in Fiumana she held her baby in both arms. The figures in the background express uncertainty or seem to be talking amongst themselves. The first row of workers are delineated with greater plasticity, "while embedding, like a river, the final part of the array, under a sky articulated with serene spaces and turbulent clouds."

This dynamism was also translated in work's palette, which returned to a cold range of colors that included rosy ochres, arranged with small brushstrokes of little lines and points. This is the post-Impressionist technique of divisionism, which tried to take a more scientific approach to color and became a national Italian art style.

The technical picture is explained by Pellizza in a letter of May 18, 1898, sent to his friend Mucchi:

The theory of contrasts helps me, that the complements and the division of color depend on the purpose that I set for myself in my works. All the science regarding light and colors arouse in me a particular interest: with it, I can understand what I make. [...] For this aim, I make my attempts presently; and, in the hope of reaching better results, I make preliminary studies to better determine in my mind what I wish to do. Then I draw cartoons of gesso on canvas. On this, I apply the prepared color, and therefore I look to finish each detail of the painting from life. And for the result, its production will not be in all the points, nor all the lines, nor all the impasto, and not even all that is smooth or all that is rough; but as varied as are the various appearances of the objects in nature and the joining of forms with the colors in "a speaking harmony" (this being the supreme goal), an idea in the mind or a feeling in the heart.

With Il Camino dei Lavoratori, Pellizza's social aim for the picture changed, as he adopted Italian socialist proletarian culture. The depiction was no longer of a "human river," but of "men of labor" who struggled for universal rights as part of the class struggle. Also, unlike in previous versions, the figures of Il Cammino dei Lavoratori are individuated and identifiable. The workers' step toward the observer is not violent; it is slow, with a calmness that gives a sense of invincibility. This sense of inevitability matches Pellizza's belief in the gradual transformation of Italy into a socialist society.

The drafting of Il Cammino dei Lavoratori took three years. Pellizza was able to finish painting in 1901, and when the work was complete he decided to give it a new title—Il Quarto Stato—to refer to the Fourth Estate, the working class. This decision is attributed to Pellizza's discussion with a friend, Arzano, about their reading of Storia della rivoluzione francese by Jean Jaurès, which stated the third estate comprised both the bourgeois and the proletariat.

== Description and style ==
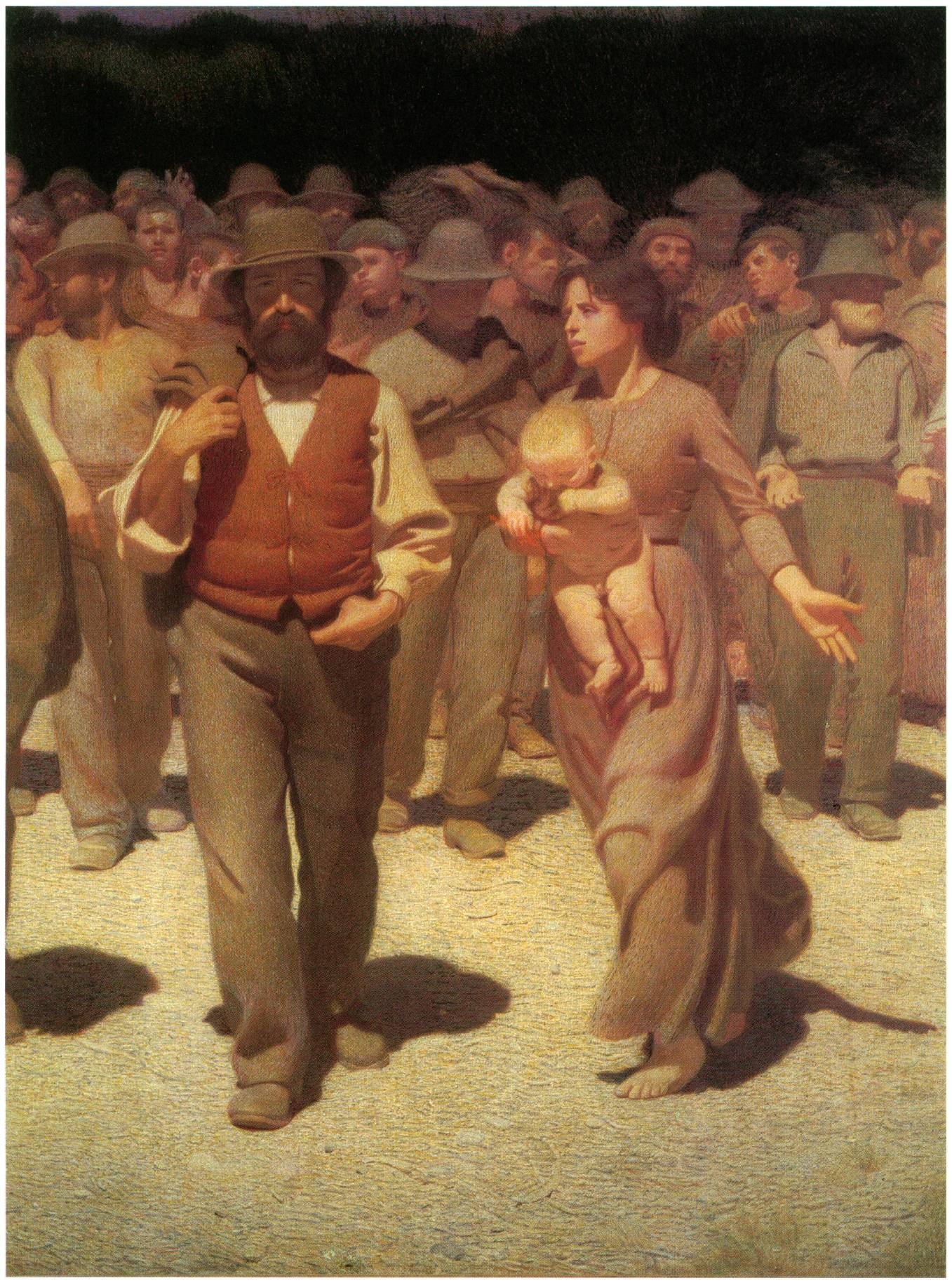
Detail of The Fourth Estate

Considered a symbol of the 20th century, artistically and socially, The Fourth Estate depicts a workers' strike. The divisionist style is used to depict the strikers walking casually towards the light, with their shadows behind them. The painting represents the full development of this theme from Pellizza's preparatory studies. The composition of the painting is balanced in its shapes and vibrant in its light, giving force to the mass movement it depicts.

The painting's laborers march in a piazza, presumably Piazza Malaspina in Volpedo. The procession's advance is not violent, but slow and sure, to suggest their inevitable victory. It was Pellizza's intention to give life to "a mass of people, of laborers of the earth who, intelligent, strong, robust, and united, advance like a river that floods each obstacle in its way to reassume a place of equilibrium." While Pellizza first wished only to draw a street demonstration, as had been represented in other works of the time (such as La Piazza Caricamento a Genova by Nomellini and The Orator of the Strike by Longoni), in later versions his intent changed to celebrating the imposition of the working classes, the "Fourth Estate," on the bourgeoisie class.

In the foreground of the image, there are three definite subjects: two men and a woman with a baby in her arms. The woman, whom Pellizza modeled on his wife Teresa, has bare feet and invites the demonstrators to follow her with an eloquent gesture. The folds of her dress show forward movement. To her right is probably the main protagonist of the scene: a "man of 35, fiery and intelligent, a laborer" (as Pelliza described him). He has one hand in his pants pocket and the other carries a jacket thrown over his shoulder; he proceeds with ease and strength. To his right is another man who advances mute and pensive, with a jacket falling over his left shoulder.

The other protestors take up around a fifth of the painting's frontal plane. They all display natural gestures: some carry babies in their arms, others use their hands to block the sun from their eyes, and some simply look straight ahead. Their figures are spread out horizontally, following a paratactic composition. On the one hand, this compositional solution recalls classical friezes. On the other, it evokes the realistic scene of a street demonstration. As described by art critic Maresa Sottile, through this combination, Pellizza "harmoniously joined the values of ancient classical civility to the modern consciousness of one's own civil rights." Pellizza married the demonstration to images reminiscent of Renaissance artworks, which directly inspired him through the expressiveness of figures in masterpieces like The School of Athens by Raphael and The Last Supper by Leonardo da Vinci.

The painting is in the divisionist style, which was popular in early 20th century Italy. The style, similar to the earlier pointillism, uses the juxtaposition of individual points of color to create new chromatic experiences, rather than mixing paints before they reach the canvas. It was believed that this led to the most natural depiction of light possible, through the scientific application of color. Art critic de Puppo also believes that the use of unmixed colors to generate the entire painting's palette has affinity with its theme of "organized masses of people."

== Models ==
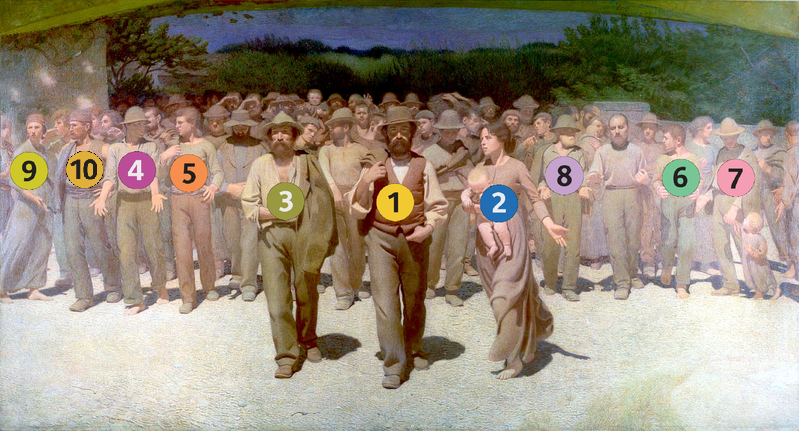
The models who posed for the making of The Fourth Estate. The numbers correspond to the text of the paragraph

Many characters depicted in the painting are modeled after friends of the artist, socialist activists, and natives of Volpedo. The woman in the forefront holding a baby is based on Teresa Bidone, the artist's wife:

: Giovanni Zarri, called Gioanon, born on December 3, 1854, in Volpedo to Angiola Regiza. He began his carpentry business at a young age. He married Luigina Belloni, with whom he had eight children, and they moved to via Ferzina 13 in Volpedo, where he lived until his death on October 30, 1910. This figure was also partly modeled on Giovanni Gatti, the pharmacist in Volpedo, whom Pellizza enjoyed discussing socialism with.
: Teresa Bidone, daughter of Antonio and Tranquilla Mandirola, born in Volpedo in 1875. In 1892, she married Pellizza, and they had three children: Maria, Nerina, and Pietro. She died in 1907, immediately after giving birth to their third child.
: Giacomo Bidone, later known as Giacomo Maria Clemente Silvestro, born in Volpedo on October 16, 1884. He remained there, working as a carpenter and remaining a widower after the death of his wife Lucotti, until 1891, when he moved to Viguzzolo. From there, he emigrated to America, following the footsteps of his uncle.
: Luigi Dolcini, born in Volpedo on February 23, 1881 to Siro Emanuele Zaccaria and Giuseppina Giani.
,: Giuseppe Tedesi, born July 18, 1883 in Volpedo. Creator of a historic family of tableware, he lived in the town of Brignano-Frascata together with his wife Rosalia Giani. He died in 1968.
: Lorenzo Roveretti, son of Giovanni and Bidone Teresa di Filippo, born in Volpedo on January 17, 1874.
: Costantino Gatti, born in Volpedo on the October 1, 1849 to Carlo and Rosa Torlasco. A known local basketmaker, he married Guiditta Bernini in 1878. He lived with her until his death on December 9, 1925.
: Maria Albina Bidone, younger sister of Teresa Bidone and born in Volpedo in 1879. She died of consumption in 1907. Her husband Giovanni Ferrari, overwhelmed by sadness, committed suicide in 1932.

== Name ==
For Pellizza, "Fourth Estate" referred to the exploited working class. Before the French Revolution, French society was divided into three estates or orders: the First Estate (clergy); the Second Estate (nobility); and the Third Estate (commoners). Although the Third Estate was by far the largest, it was also heterogeneous and included everyone from urban professionals and businessmen to farmers and laborers. The French Revolution marked the ascent of the bourgeoisie as the ruling class within the third estate. Social and industrial transformations accelerated the perception of the working class as a distinct social class—a "fourth estate" producing the wealth of the modern economy but deprived of political representation.

== Reception and legacy ==
Pellizza always intended The Fourth Estate to be publicly displayed. It was first unveiled to the public at the Prima Esposizione Internazionale d'Arte Decorativa Moderna, held in Turin in 1902. The work received no recognition (the jury, which included Pellizza's sculptor friend Leonardo Bistolfi, awarded Davide Calandra and his Monument to the Prince Amedeo), and it was not bought by a museum. Although The Fourth Estate was passed over by art critics, it was applauded by other painters and labor organizers. The poet Giovanni Cena wrote that "it is something that will remain and not fear time, because time will aid it."

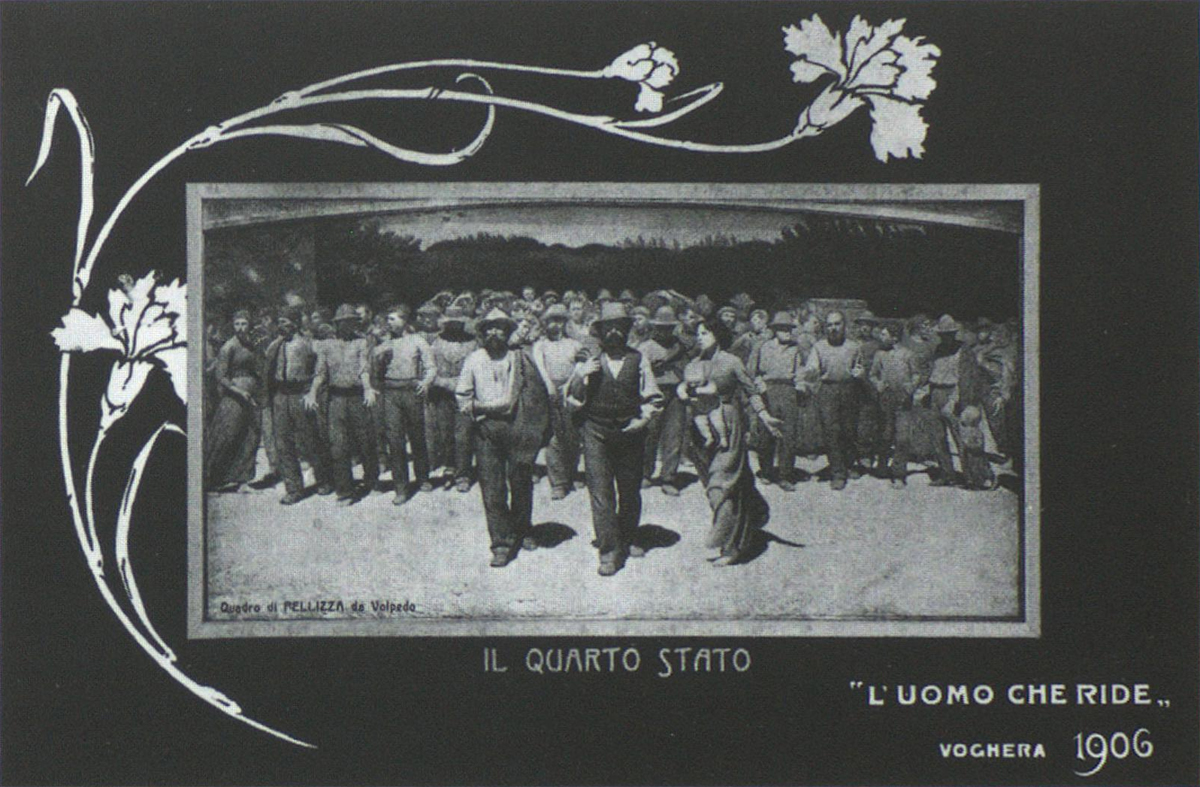
Postcard with The Fourth Estate decorated by an Art Nouveau carnation and printed by the magazine L'Uomo che ride as a tribute to subscribers

In 1903, the painting was reproduced in the Milanese journal Leggetemi! Almanacco per la pace as an artistic frame for an article by Edmondo De Amicis. It was reproduced on May 1, 1903, in the journal Unione and on May 1, 1904, in the periodical L'Avanguardia socialist. It was used in 1905 as a symbol of the working class in Avanti! della domenica, a daily magazine of the Italian Socialist Party. In 1906, the Vogherese journal L'Uomo che ride made a postcard of the painting on the direction of Ernesto Majocchi, a good friend of Pellizza, with the "most grateful" consent of the artist. While the painting still did not garner much acclaim from art critics, it became more and more well known through its numerous reproductions and prints in socialist newspapers.

Meanwhile, with the wide diffusion of the work, Pellizza tried several times in vain to exhibit The Fourth Estate. Exhibition committees routinely refused to exhibit the painting during those early years due to its subject matter. Pellizza would only see it exhibited once, in 1907 at the Society for the Promotion of Arts in Rome, before his death by suicide in June of that year.

After Pellizza's death, The Fourth Estate remained the property of his family, out of public view. In 1920, it was displayed in a retrospective show dedicated to Pellizza at the Galleria Pesaro in Milan, thanks to the growth of leftist culture during the Biennio Rosso. It was a decisive show for the physical future of the work; the painting impressed Guido Marangoni, a socialist councilor of Milan and art critic. With the municipal counselor Fausto Costa, Marangoni managed to purchase it in 1920 through public subscription for 50,000 lire. After its acquisition, the painting entered the collection of Galleria d'Arte Moderna, Milan and was displayed in the ballroom of Sforza Castle.

During the Italian fascist regime in the 1930s, the painting was rolled up and stored in the basement of the castle. After the war, it was reinstated for public view in 1954 and was displayed initially in the Palazzo Marino. Its utopian representation of social progress was popular during the ongoing political struggle between the Christian Democrat party and the Italian socialist and communist parties during the 1950s. The acclaim of art critic Corrado Maltese, who declared in 1960 that the painting was "the greatest monument that the workers' movement has ever been able to boast in Italy," also kept The Fourth Estate in the public eye.

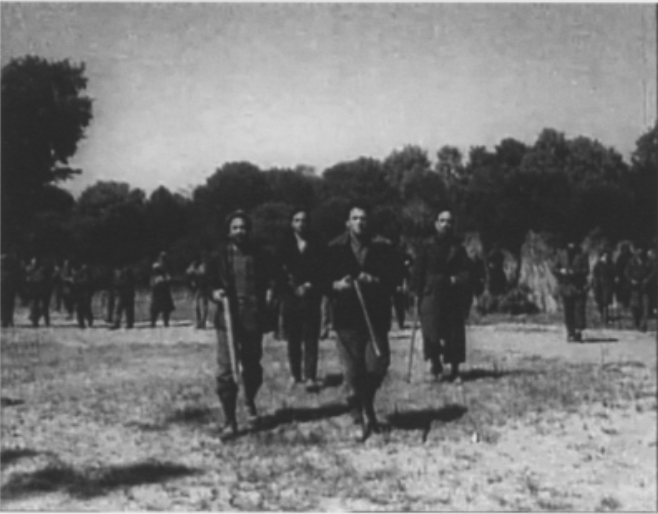
Still from Tragic Hunt inspired by The Fourth Estate

With the development of mass media, The Fourth Estate was popularized outside of artistic and literary circles, appearing even in film. Pelizza's compositional choices became a touchstone for leftist Italian artists in the 1940s and '50s: Giuseppe De Santis used the image of workers walking forward in a line for his neorealist 1947 film, Tragic Hunt, and Renato Guttuso used The Fourth Estate to compose his (now destroyed) 1953 oil painting Occupazione di terre in Sicilia. From that point on, the painting became a feature of numerous exhibitions and research projects, notably including monographs by Aurora Scotti and Gabriella Pelissero. Bernardo Bertolucci's epic historical film of 1976, 1900, displayed the opening credits over a slow zoom of The Fourth Estate.

After undergoing a restoration by Giovanni Rossi in 1976, The Fourth Estate remained at the Palazzo Marino until 1980, when it moved to the Galleria d'Arte Moderna in Milan. It was displayed in a gallery room entirely devoted to divisionism. It remained there until December 2010, when it was moved to Milan's Museo del Novecento. It was subsequently returned to the Galleria d'Arte Moderna. (The earlier Fiumana version is held in the Palazzo Citterio. (also in Milan.)

The Museo del Novecento considers the painting one of its most valuable masterpieces, and the architect Italo Rota was commissioned to design a room to house the display of the painting. The display, however, was criticized for its awkward and constrained space. The museum had decided to make the work viewable to the public, without a ticket, but not to display the work in the museum's main lobby, leading to Institutional Critique of the museum.

Still, The Fourth Estate itself is held up as an exemplar of Italian social realism at the turn of the 20th century. Modern critics have also noted its contradiction between socialist symbolism and Catholic nostalgia.

== See also ==
- Social realism and socialist realism
- Socialism in Italy
- Scapigliatura

== Bibliography ==
- Scotti, Aurora (1976). Giuseppe Pellizza da Volpedo: Il Quarto Stato (in Italian). Milan: Mazzotta.
