= Braddock Hotel =

Hotel in Manhattan, New York

Coordinates: 40.81086°N 73.95051°W

Braddock Hotel was a hotel at the corner of 126th Street and 8th Avenue in New York City, near the Apollo Theater. The hotel bar was popular with black jazz musicians, and Dizzy Gillespie, Billy Eckstine, Billie Holiday, Ella Fitzgerald and Dinah Washington performed here. Before he joined the Nation of Islam, Malcolm X (then known as Malcolm Little) often spent time at the hotel's bar.

There was also a Braddock Hotel near the Southland ballroom in Warrenton Street, Boston.
