= Harlem riot of 1935 =

Race riot in New York City, United States

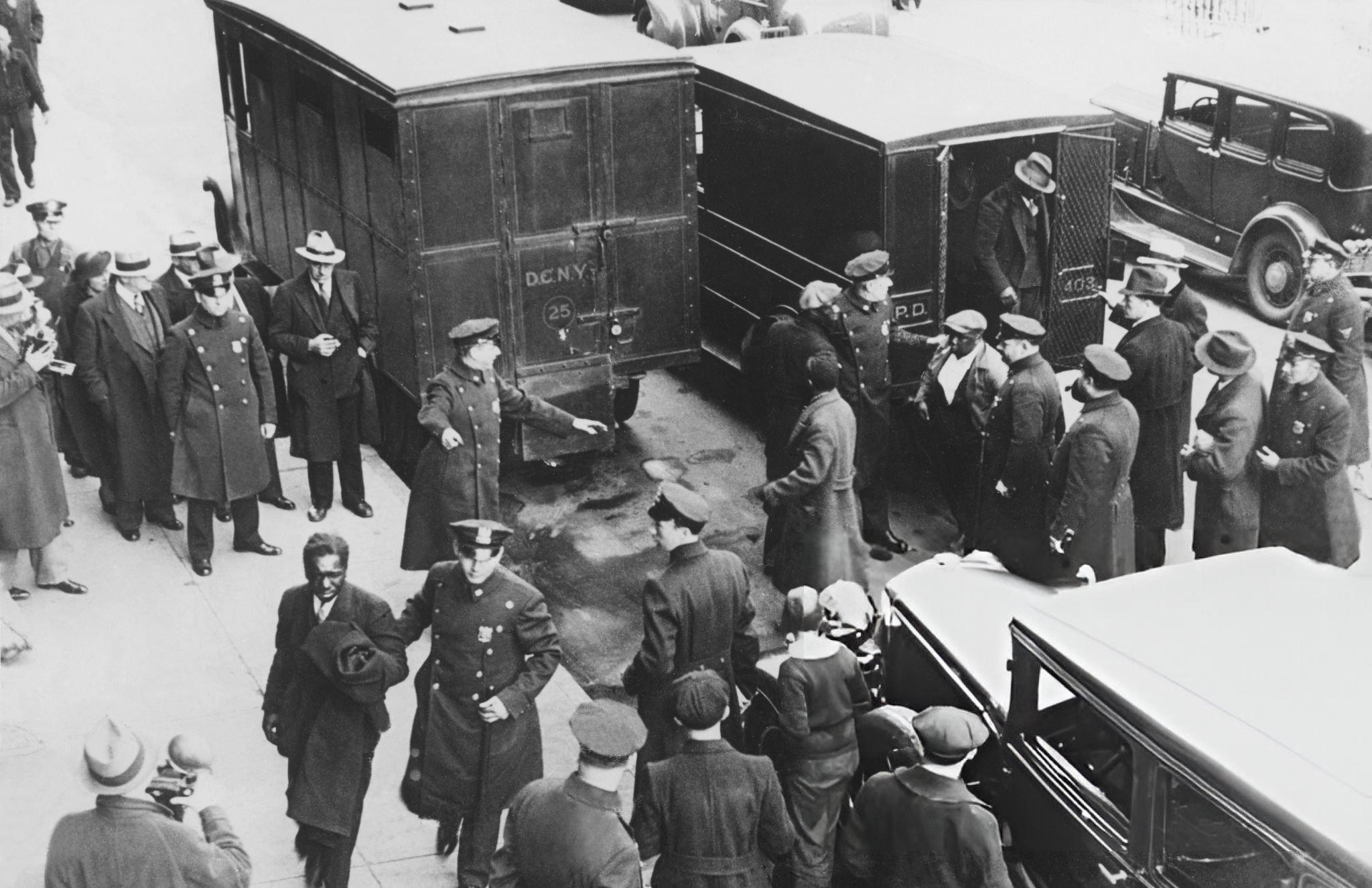
- Date: March 19, 1935
- Location: Harlem, New York City, New York
- Caused by: reports of a black teen being beaten by a store owner

Parties
Black rioters	New York Police Department

Casualties
- Deaths: 3
- Injuries: Hundreds

The Harlem riot of 1935 took place on March 19, 1935, in New York City, New York, in the United States. It has been described as the first "modern" race riot in Harlem, because it was committed primarily against property rather than persons. Harlem is a northern neighborhood on Manhattan Island in New York City whose population at the time was predominantly African American.

The rioting was sparked by rumors that a black Puerto Rican teenage shoplifter was beaten by employees at an S. H. Kress "five and dime" store. That evening, a demonstration was held outside the store, and, after someone threw a rock through the window, more general destruction of the store and other white-owned properties ensued. Three people died, hundreds were wounded, and an estimated $2 million in damage was caused to properties throughout the district. African American-owned homes and businesses were spared the worst of the destruction.

== Background ==
During the Great Depression, minorities in Harlem and elsewhere in New York suffered as they struggled with unemployment. Minorities were often fired first and hired last in times of fluctuating employment, and conditions were bleak.

=== Inciting incident ===
At 2:30 in the afternoon on March 19, 1935, an employee at the Kress Five and Ten store at 256 W. 125th Street (just across the street from the Apollo Theater) caught 16-year-old Lino Rivera shoplifting a 10-cent penknife; the teen was a black Puerto Rican. When his captor threatened to take Rivera into the store's basement and "beat the hell out of him", Rivera bit the employee's hand. The manager intervened and the police were called, but Rivera was taken through the basement and out the back door and eventually released. In the meantime, a crowd had begun to gather outside around a woman who had witnessed Rivera's apprehension; she was shouting that Rivera was being beaten. When an ambulance showed up to treat the wounds of the employee who had been bitten, it appeared to confirm the woman's story. When the crowd noticed a hearse parked outside of the store, the rumor began to circulate that Rivera had been beaten to death. The woman who had raised the alarm was arrested for disorderly conduct, the Kress Five and Ten store was closed early, and the crowd was dispersed by police. After the rioting started, the police decided to get Rivera to show that he was unharmed but did not produce him until the next morning because the teen had given a fake address when first detained.

== Riot ==
=== Outbreak ===
In the early evening, a group called the Young Liberators started a demonstration outside the store, quickly drawing thousands of people. Handbills were distributed: One was headlined "Child Brutally Beaten". Another denounced "the brutal beating of the 12 year old boy ... for taking a piece of candy".

At some point, someone threw a rock, shattering the window of the Kress Five and Ten store, and the destruction and looting began to spread east and west on 125th Street, targeting white-owned businesses between Fifth and Eighth avenues. Some stores posted signs that read "Colored Store" or "Colored Help Employed Here". In the early hours of the morning, as the rioting spread north and south, the police picked up Lino Rivera from his mother's apartment and took a photograph of him with a police officer; copies were distributed throughout Harlem to show that Rivera had not been harmed. New York Mayor Fiorello La Guardia also had posters drawn up urging a return to peace.

=== Aftermath and investigation ===
By the end of the next day, the streets of Harlem were returned to order. Three black people were killed, 125 people were arrested and 100 people were injured. District Attorney William C. Dodge blamed Communist incitement. Mayor LaGuardia set up a multi-racial Mayor's Commission on Conditions in Harlem, headed by African-American sociologist E. Franklin Frazier and with members including Judge Hubert Thomas Delany, Countee Cullen, and labor leader A. Philip Randolph, to investigate the causes of the riot. The committee issued a report, The Negro in Harlem: A Report on Social and Economic Conditions Responsible for the Outbreak of March 19, 1935, which described the rioting as "spontaneous" with "no evidence of any program or leadership of the rioters". The report identified "injustices of discrimination in employment, the aggressions of the police, and the racial segregation" as conditions which led to the outbreak of rioting. The report congratulated the Communist organizations as deserving "more credit than any other element in Harlem for preventing a physical conflict between whites and blacks". Alain Locke was appointed to implement the report's findings.

Mayor Fiorello La Guardia shelved the committee's report, and did not make it public. The report would be unknown, except that a black New York newspaper, the Amsterdam News, subsequently published it in serial form.

== Historical analysis ==
Jeffrey Stewart, professor of history at George Mason University, described the Harlem riot of 1935 as "the first modern race riot", adding that it "symbolized that the optimism and hopefulness that had fueled the Harlem Renaissance was dead".

Sociologist Allen D. Grimshaw called the Harlem riot of 1935 "the first manifestation of a 'modern' form of racial rioting", citing three criteria:

1. "violence directed almost entirely against property"
2. "the absence of clashes between racial groups"
3. "struggles between the lower-class Negro population and the police forces"

Whereas previous race riots had been characterized by violent clashes between groups of black and white rioters, subsequent riots would resemble the riot in Harlem.

== See also ==
- Harlem riot of 1943 – disturbance during World War II after a policeman shot and wounded a black U.S. Army soldier.
- Harlem riot of 1964 – six days of civil disorder that occurred after an African-American teenager was shot and killed by an NYPD lieutenant.
- List of incidents of civil unrest in New York City
- List of incidents of civil unrest in the United States
