= Harlem riot of 1964 =

1964 American riot

- Part of the Ghetto riots
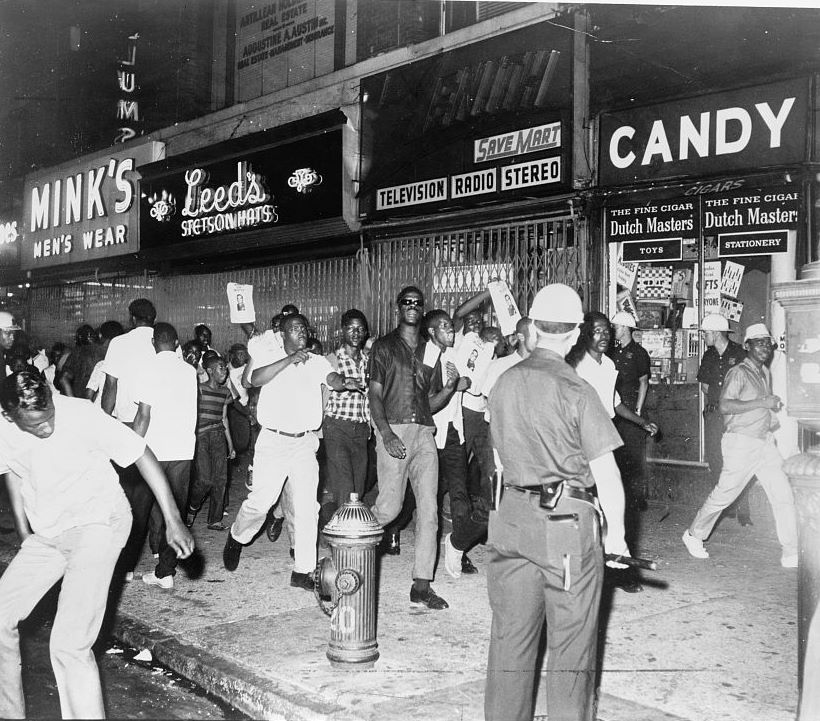
- Demonstrators carrying photographs of Lieutenant Thomas Gilligan
- Date: July 16–22, 1964
- Location: Harlem, New York City
- Methods: Rioting, protests, looting, vandalism

Parties
NYPD	Rioters

Casualties
- Deaths: 1
- Injuries: 144
- Arrested: 519

The Harlem riot of 1964 was a race riot that occurred between July 16 and 22, 1964 in the New York City neighborhoods of Harlem and Bedford-Stuyvesant, United States. It began after James Powell, a 15-year-old African American, was shot and killed by police Lieutenant Thomas Gilligan in front of Powell's friends and about a dozen other witnesses. Hundreds of students from Powell's school protested the killing. The shooting set off six consecutive nights of rioting. By some accounts, 4,000 people participated in the riots. People attacked the New York City Police Department (NYPD), destroyed property, and looted stores. Several rioters were severely beaten by NYPD officers. The riots and unrest left one dead, 118 injured, and 465 arrested.

== Background ==
In the early 1900s, the Harlem neighborhood in Manhattan benefited from the construction of new subway routes, and in turn, saw an increase in real estate investment. However, by 1905, many homes sat vacant, and landlords opened their doors to Black people.

More Black people began to move to New York from the south. The Afro-American Realty Company allowed Black residents to invest in real estate and avoid eviction by white property owners. Black churches solidified their cultural and financial position in the neighborhood.

In the early 1920s, many Black American institutions, such as NAACP, Odd Fellows, and The United Order of True Reformers, started moving their headquarters to Harlem which, with the continuous migration of Blacks, received the name of "Greater Harlem". The Harlem Renaissance was in full swing.

Black public figures, such as Father Divine, Daddy Grace and Marcus Garvey started spreading their ideas of salvation for the Black community. After World War II, the neighborhood again suffered disinvestment. Despite its attractive facade, tensions among Harlem residents increased. The murder rate in the area shot up dramatically, and street crime became a fixture of Harlem nightlife.

== Shooting of James Powell ==
Patrick Lynch was a building superintendent in Yorkville, a predominantly working-class white area on the Upper East Side of Manhattan. Lynch was frequently aggravated by young people who hung out on the building stoop. On July 16, 1964, around 9:15 a.m., he sprayed water from a hose on Black students, who said Lynch shouted “Dirty niggers, I'll wash you clean." Lynch refuted this account. The students, attending summer school across the street, responded by throwing bottles and garbage can lids at Lynch.

James Powell, 15, was among a group of Bronx youth who were drawn to the disturbance. Powell pursued Lynch into the building, and according to a witness, "didn't stay two minutes." As Powell exited the building, off-duty NYPD police Lieutenant Thomas Gilligan had also been drawn to the disturbance and ran to the scene from a nearby shop.

Gilligan, confronting Powell, said he fired a warning shot which hit a window in the building. Powell then lunged at him with a knife, and Gilligan fired twice in self defense, killing Powell.

The facts of the shooting are subject to debate. Witnesses said Powell was not holding a knife and that he threw up his right arm in a defensive gesture.

=== Lieutenant Gilligan's version of the events ===
Hearing a disturbance in the street, Gilligan said he ran to the apartment building with his badge and gun displayed. "I'm a police lieutenant. Come out and drop it!," he said he yelled at Powell. He then fired a warning shot as he saw Powell raising the knife. Powell then lunged at Gilligan. With his gun, Gilligan blocked Powell's from stabbing him, and deflecting the knife to his arm. The attack led Gilligan to fire a third round that killed Powell.

=== Witnesses' version of the events ===
Witnesses saw Powell run into the building and did not see a knife. As he exited the vestibule, some said he was laughing until Lieutenant Gilligan shot him. Other witnesses with a clear view of the shooting said Powell threw up his right arm in a defensive gesture, and that he was not holding a knife.

The most controversial account of the shooting came from Cliff Harris, Powell's friend. Powell, Cliff Harris and Carl Dudley, left the Bronx that morning and headed to Manhattan. Powell had two knives which he had given to each of his friends to hold for him, Harris said. In Yorkville, he asked for the knives back. Upon Dudley's refusal he asked Cliff, who asked him why he wanted it back, and then handed it over.

The knife, which was not seen on the crime scene at the moment of the incident, was later found by a teacher, according to a school principal. The knife was found in the gutter about eight feet from where Powell lay shot, according to the principal.

=== People ===
==== Lieutenant Thomas Gilligan ====
Lieutenant Gilligan had served seventeen years in the NYPD. Prior to killing Powell, Gilligan had shot a man who he said was trying to push him off a roof, and he also shot a younger man who he said was burglarizing cars in front of his apartment. The New York Daily News reported that Gilligan had disarmed suspects in the past. He was 6'2" (187 cm) tall and weighed 200 pounds (91 kg).

==== James Powell ====
Powell was from the Bronx. He was in the ninth grade, and was attending summer school at the Robert F. Wagner Sr. Junior High School on East 76th Street, across the street from where he was shot. Neighbors said the young boy had become "a little wild" after the death of his father. He had four prior run-ins with the law. He was twice caught trying to board a subway or bus without paying. He was accused of breaking a car window and attempted robbery, but he was cleared of those charges. He was 5 feet 6 inches (168 cm) tall and weighed 122 pounds (55 kg).

== Rioting, protests, and unrest ==
=== Day 1: Thursday, July 16 ===
Just moments after Gilligan shot Powell, and as police were securing the crime scene, 300 teenagers who had been attending summer school across the street spilled out of the building. The students, who were mostly Black, began throwing bottles, cans, and chunks of cement at the police. At least 75 officers had to be called in to quell the angry crowd.

=== Day 2: Friday, July 17 ===
On the morning after the shooting, the Congress of Racial Equality (CORE) went to the school building. They demanded a civilian review board to discipline the police, but they were met by 50 officers holding nightsticks. About 200 picketers, mainly whites and Puerto Ricans, protested at the school around noon that day. They chanted “Stop killer cops!”, “We want legal protection” and “End police brutality!”

=== Day 3: Saturday, July 18, through early morning Sunday, July 19 ===
On July 18, the temperature soared to 92 °F (33 °C). About 250 people attended a funeral for James Powell. Police had erected barricades in the area around the funeral. Police officers were also present at a rally protesting the rising crime rate in Harlem. Both the funeral and protest ended without incident.

Later, at a largely peaceful CORE rally, Reverend Nelson C. Dukes called for protestors to march on the 28th police precinct. The organizers demanded that Gilligan be suspended.

Among those who marched on the precinct were Black Nationalist Edward Mills Davis and James Lawson. Arriving at the precinct, organizers briefly spoke with police Inspector Pendergast, but the crowd had quickly turned violent. People threw bottles and bricks at the police, and others took to nearby rooftops, hurling tiles and other debris on police.

By the time the rioting began, many members of the press had already left the protest.

Officers rushed to the rooftops, arresting CORE members. Michael Doris became the first police officer injured in the riots when he was hit in the face with a bottle. Inspector Pendergast told officers to clear the streets.

By 10 p.m., a thousand people had assembled at the intersection of the Seventh Avenue and 125th Street. "Go home, go home", police shouted. The crowd answered back: "We are home, Baby."

More officers from the Tactical Patrol Force (TPF) arrived and attempted to break the crowd up. One group of rioters went down to 123rd St., leaving destruction in their wake. Around 10:30 p.m., a Molotov cocktail was thrown on a police car near the Theresa hotel, injuring an officer.

Police officers received permission to draw their firearms, and some fired into the air. Officials later found a man who had been shot in the chaos with a .38 caliber round. Meanwhile, police in the Bronx loaded a truck with ammunition to be driven to the scene of unrest. Other people were swept up in the chaos as they exited the subway and local businesses, and some did not realize they were being pursued by police.

The chaos ended at 8 a.m. on Lenox Street, where what was left of the rioters had regrouped before being dispersed by a large number of police officers. One rioter had been killed, 12 policemen and 19 civilians were injured, and 30 were arrested. Over 22 stores had been looted, according to police. This account was hotly contested by hospital officials, who counted 7 gunshot wounds and 110 persons with serious injuries.

=== Day 4: Sunday, July 19, through Monday, July 20 ===
Following the chaos of Saturday night, NYPD Police Commissioner Michael J. Murphy distributed a statement to every church in Harlem. “In our estimation, this is a crime problem and not a social problem!," the flier read.

Malcolm X, answered the missive later that day. "There are probably more armed Negroes in Harlem than in any other spot on earth. If the people who are armed get involved in this, you can bet they'll really have something on their hands," Malcolm X said.

The tension between the community and the NYPD increased, as citizens taunted police and firefighters. Firefighters at times turned their hoses on members of the public.

James Farmer, national director of CORE, said he saw bullet holes in windows and walls of the Theresa Hotel, and blamed the police for much of the violence that had spread through the neighborhood the night before.

At a tense community meeting, some members of the Black Citizens Council called for "Guerilla warfare" against the NYPD.

Others were more measured in their response to the violence. "If we must die, we must die scientifically," said Bayard Rustin, engineer of the March on Washington and the New York's first school boycott. Other speakers at the rally tried to reason with the crowd to join in a peaceful protest.

A fight broke out, and two reporters were beaten by some in the crowd, and police officers did not intervene. The group moved to the Delany Funeral Home, where a service for Powell's death had been scheduled for 8 a.m. Someone threw a bottle at the police and the police threw it back at the crowd. The riot had started once again, and people threw objects from rooftops.

Bayard Rustin and other speakers were trying to calm the crowd, but the crowd shouted back at them: "Tom, Uncle Tom."

Police shot two young men in the chaos. The rioting continued past midnight. Molotov cocktails were thrown by protesters. The police shot and wounded two more men, and a police officer suffered a heart attack.

The violence ended around 1.30 a.m. and left 27 policemen and 93 civilians injured, 108 arrested and 45 stores looted. Hospitals however counted more than 200 entries in their registries.

=== Day 5: Monday, July 20, through Tuesday Evening, July 21 ===
The situation was quieter in the street of Harlem on Monday. Paul R. Screvane said that a New York County grand jury would look into the murder of James Powell and at the same time, announced Mayor Wagner's hasty return to the city.

Protestors rallied at the United Nations demonstration, calling for an end to genocide against Black Americans.

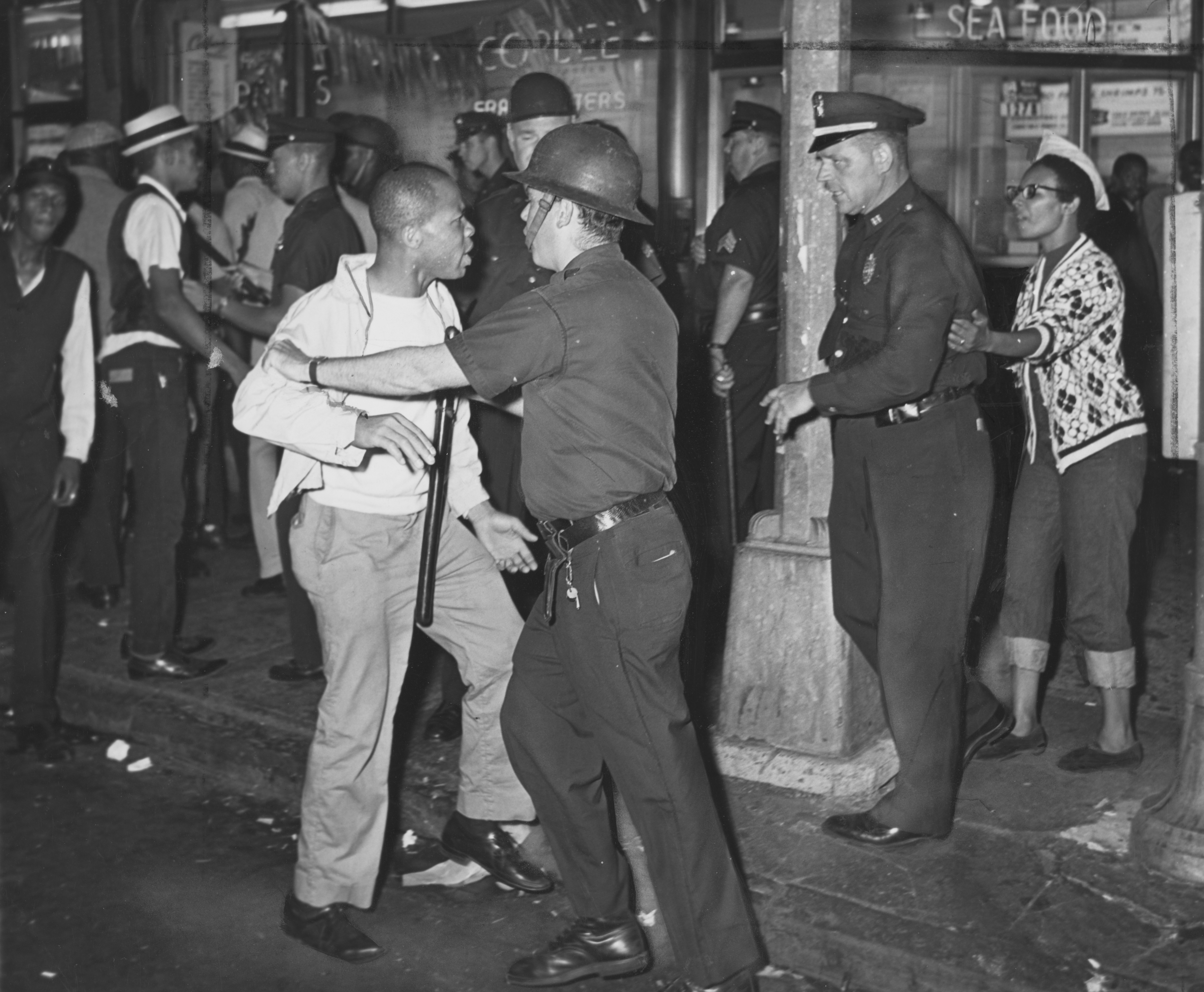
Confrontation between African Americans and police at Fulton Street and Nostrand Avenue on July 21, in Brooklyn.

The Brooklyn CORE branch had prepared an all-day march for Monday in support of the rioters and activists in Harlem. They protested the shooting of Powell and denounced police brutality against Harlem residents. After blocking four main intersections in the Bedford-Stuyvesant neighborhood, the CORE members and other protestors met at Nostrand Ave. and Fulton St., where the crowd swelled to about 1000 people. The crowd became more agitated, and ignored speakers at the rally.

The police, who had kept a low profile so far that day, suddenly called for reinforcements. CORE members tried to control the crowd and ultimately urged them to go home. Police charged into the crowd, indiscriminately beating people. The chaos continued until morning.

=== Day 6: Tuesday night, July 21, through Wednesday, July 22 ===
A meeting was brokered between Black protest organizers and Captain Edward Jenkins of Brooklyn's 79th precinct at the Bedford YMCA, to little effect.

Speakers from Black Nationalist Party attended an event usually organized by CORE. During a speech, the crowd again grew agitated. Rioting soon brook out again, and police charged the mob, who responded with bottles and other objects. The unrest continued until 2 a.m. Wednesday.

Police officials launched an investigation targeting protest organizers and other agitators, specifically Black Nationalists and the Harlem Progressive Labor Club, the Harlem branch of the Progressive Labor Party. Mayor Paul R. Screvane defended the police and the investigation.

On Wednesday night, police on horseback patrolled the intersection of Nostrand Ave. and Fulton St. in Brooklyn. The NAACP drove a truck up and down local streets. A crowd later formed around the truck and an NAACP spokesperson addressed the crowd. He claimed that Bedford-Stuyvesant was a "community of law". He said that riots weren't how they were going to get what they wanted. Several men soon approached the sound truck. They started to rock the vehicle while the people around the truck grew agitated, and a riot soon began again.

== Aftermath ==
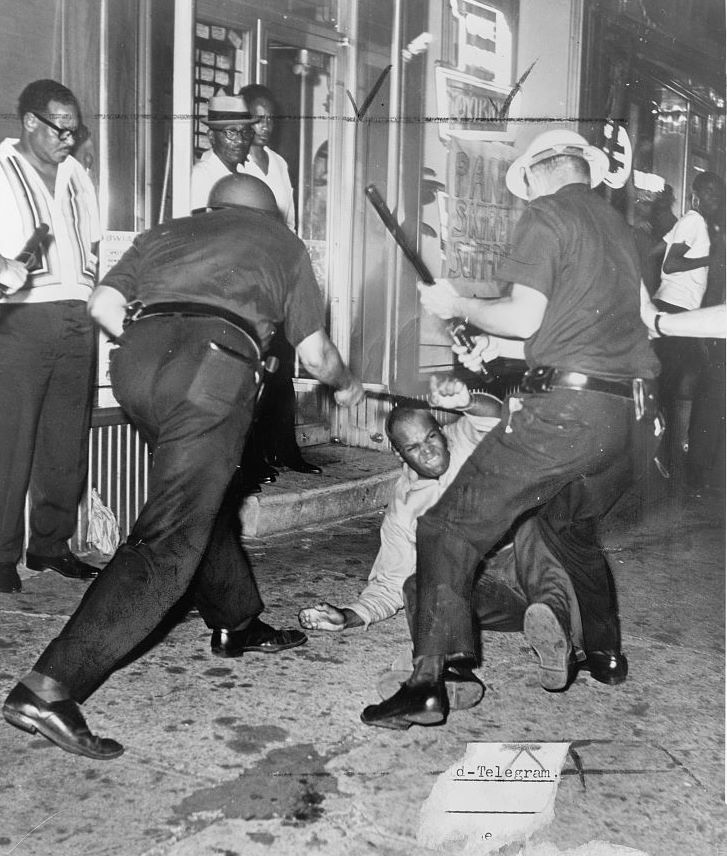
An incident at 133rd Street and Seventh Avenue during the Harlem riot of 1964

An estimated 144 people were injured, one person was killed, and a further 465 men and women were arrested over the course of the unrest. 541 shops were looted or damaged with costs estimated between $1 million (equivalent to $10,380,901 in 2025) and $2 million (equivalent to $20,761,803 in 2025).

Two months after the shooting, Gilligan was cleared of any wrongdoing by a grand jury. He maintained Powell had lunged at him with a knife.

=== Project Uplift (1965) ===
Project Uplift was a major short-term program of the Johnson administration's Great Society suite of social welfare programs. An experimental anti-poverty program in Harlem, New York, in the summer of 1965, it was intended to prevent the recurrence of the riots that had hit the community the summer before.

Thousands of young people were employed in a variety of jobs intended in the short run to keep them busy and, in the long run, to give them skills and opportunities to break out of poverty. Young people were employed running a summer camp, planting trees, repairing damaged buildings, and printing a newspaper. Projects included a Project Uplift theater program, run by LeRoi Jones, and a dance program.

=== In popular culture ===
The riots feature prominently in Colson Whitehead's 2021 novel "Harlem Shuffle." The riots were also depicted on Godfather of Harlem (season 2, episode 10 and season 3, episode 1).

The riots inspired the 1965 song "In the Heat of the Summer" by Phil Ochs.

== See also ==
- Harlem riot of 1935, trouble that began after rumors circulated that a young child had been severely beaten by a shopkeeper.
- Harlem riot of 1943, disturbances that began after a policeman shot and wounded a black U.S. Army soldier.
- List of incidents of civil unrest in New York City
- The Progressive Labor Party, whose members were accused by New York City law enforcement of leading the 1964 riots.
- List of incidents of civil unrest in the United States

== Bibliography ==
- Abu-Lughod, Janet L. (2007). Race, Space, and Riots in Chicago, New York, and Los Angeles. Oxford University Press. ISBN 9780195328752.
- Meister, Richard J. (1971). The Black Ghetto: Promised Land or Colony?. Heath. OCLC 756463437.
- Pinkney, Alphonso; Woock, Roger R. (1970). Poverty and Politics in Harlem. New College & University Press. ISBN 9780808402503.
- Shapiro, Fred C.; Sullivan, James W. (1964). Race riots, New York, 1964. Crowell. OCLC 614949750.
- Threadcraft, Shatema A. (2007). "New York City Riot of 1964". In Rucker, Walter C.; Upton, James N. (eds.). Encyclopedia of American Race Riots. Greenwood Publishing Group. pp. 478–480. ISBN 9780313333026.
