= Pio Sanquirico =

Italian painter (1847–1900)

Pio Sanquirico (Gudo Visconti, Austrian Empire 1847– Milan, 1900) was an Italian painter.

== Biography ==
Sanquirico mostly exhibited in Italy. In 1880 he was invited to the National Exposition of Fine Arts of Turin, where he exhibited In Time of Peace. In 1881 he exhibited three more paintings, Alla frutta, Panfilo Castaldi at the Court of the Sforza and Discovery and Delusion in Turin. The same year he displayed Una scoperta; Da Monza a Sesto, and a series of studies at the Expo of the Society for the Encouragement of the Fine Arts in Florence. In 1883 he painted and exhibited three new canvases: Confidenza; Verrà; and Il pulcino nero in Milan.The latter was also exhibited in 1883, at the Exhibition in Rome with another painting depicting Giordano Bruno, with the following inscription: Maiori forsan cum timore sententiam in me fertis quam ego accipiam (Perhaps you pronounce this sentence against me with greater fear than I receive it). His masterpiece is considered The Forbidden Fruit, originally displayed at the National Artistic Exposition in Venice in 1887. Giuseppe Pellizza da Volpedo was one of his pupils.
