= Giuseppe Puricelli =

Italian painter

Giuseppe Puricelli (1825–1894) was an Italian painter, in oil and watercolor, mainly of landscapes and outdoor and countryside genre scenes.

Born in Gallarate, Lombardy, he was a resident of Milan much of his life, which like his birthplace was in the Austrian Empire until 1859. In 1872 in Milan, he exhibited Cascinale and a canvas of a Girl at Work. In 1877 at the Exposition of Naples, he displayed Water and Bread; in 1880 at Turin, Va il pensiero come l'altalena; and in 1881 at Milan, he displayed Una stalla and Alla memoria del figlio. Puricelli also painted portraits. He died in Casirate d'Adda.
