= Liga 4 =

Liga 4 may refer to several different football leagues:

- Liga 4 (Georgia)
- Liga 4 (Indonesia)
- Liga IV (Romania)
- Copa Peru (Peru)
- Thai Semi-Pro League (Thailand)
- Championat National

== See also ==
- 4. Liga (disambiguation)
- Liga (disambiguation)
