= Lega =

Lega may refer to:

== Geography ==
- Lega (river) in Poland
- Lega, Iran, a village in Mazandaran Province
- Lega, Warmian-Masurian Voivodeship, town in north Poland
- Lega, an earlier name for Street, Somerset, a village in England

== People ==
- Lega (surname), mainly Italian family name
- Lega people, an ethnic group in the Congo
- Lega language, the language of the Lega people

== Political organizations ==
- Lega (political party), Italian party established in 2017
- Lega Nord, Italian political party established in 1989, a predecessor of Lega
- Lega dei Ticinesi, political party in Ticino, Switzerland
- La Lega (cooperative) or La Lega Nazionale, an Italian co-operative association founded in the 19th century on irredentist ideals

== Sports ==
- Lega Calcio, former governing body of Serie A and Serie B
- Lega Serie A, organizer of Serie A
- Lega Serie B, organizer of Serie B
- Lega Pallavolo Serie A, one of two organizers of the Superlega

== Other ==
- "La Lega" (song), Italian workers' song
- La lega, an 1876 opera by Giovanni Josse

== See also ==
- Legea, an Italian sportswear company
- Liga (disambiguation)
