= Liga 2 =

Liga 2 may refer to one of several different football leagues.

- Championship (Indonesia), the Indonesian Second League
- Liga II, the Romanian Second League
- Liga 2 (Peru), the Peruvian Second League
- Liga Portugal 2, the second-highest division of the Portuguese football league system.
- Moldovan Liga 2, the Moldovan Third League
- Thai League 2 The thailand second league of the Thai football league system

== See also ==
- 2. Liga (disambiguation)
- Druga Liga (disambiguation)
- Liga (disambiguation)
