= Alida Valli =

Italian actress (1921–2006)

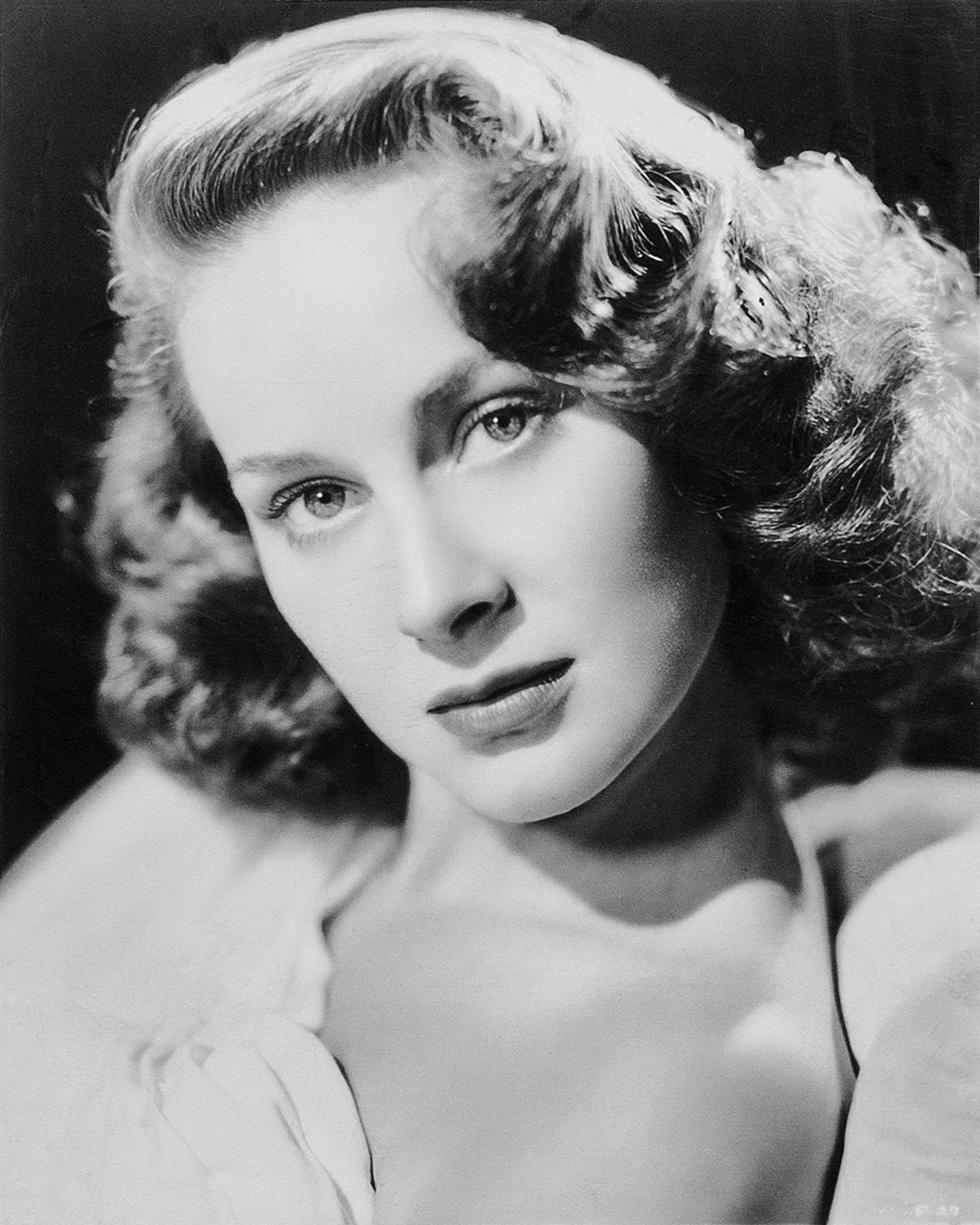
- Valli in 1947
- Born: Alida Maria Laura Freiin Altenburger von Marckenstein-Frauenberg; 31 May 1921; Pola, Kingdom of Italy (now Croatia)
- Died: 22 April 2006 (aged 84); Rome, Italy
- Other name: Valli
- Occupations: Actress, Singer
- Years active: 1936–2002
- Spouse(s): Oscar de Mejo (m. 1944; div. 1952) Giancarlo Zagni (m. 196?; div. 1970)
- Children: 2, including Carlo De Mejo

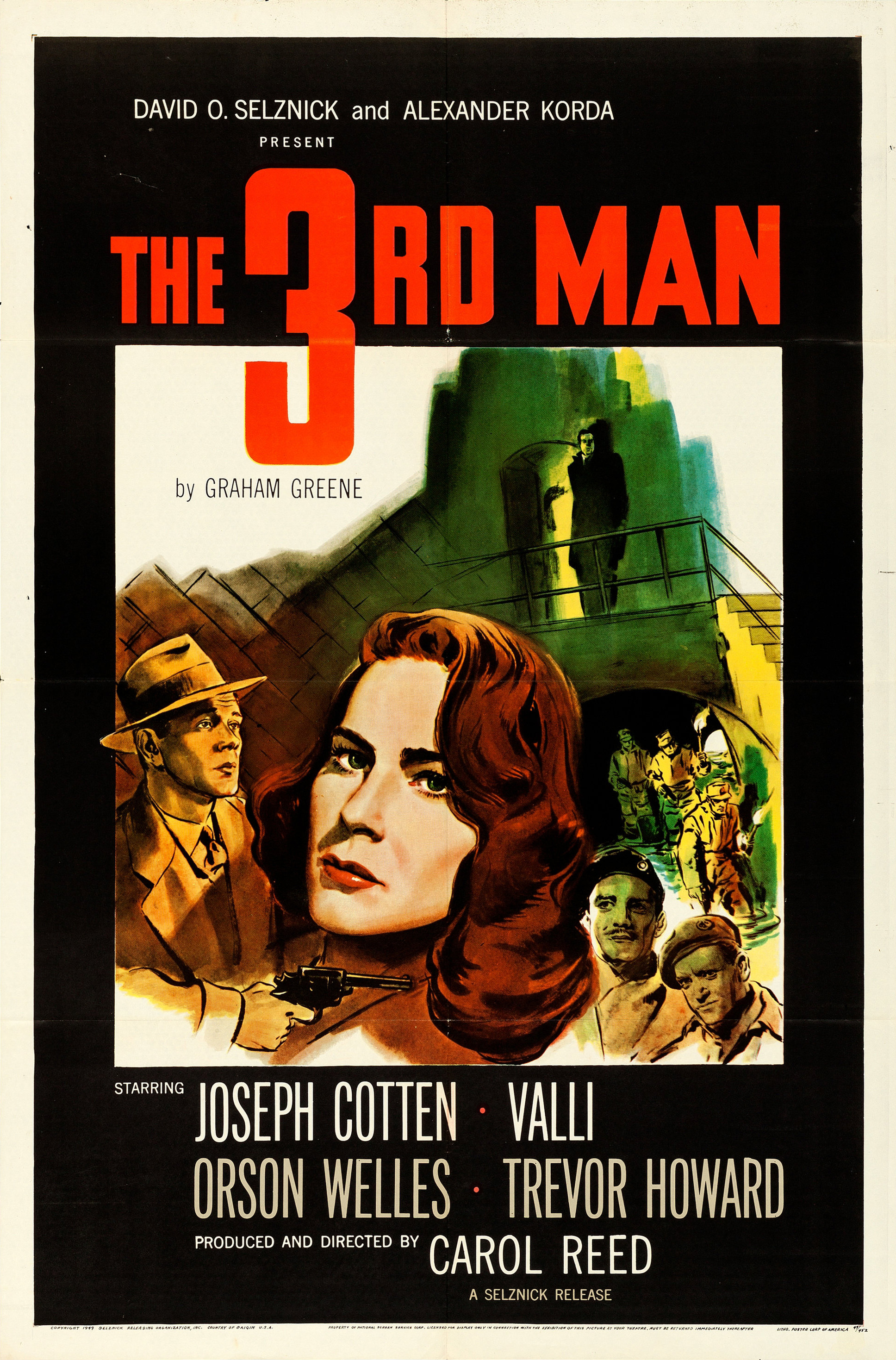
Billed as Valli for The Third Man (1949), (American theatrical release poster)

Baroness Alida Maria Laura Altenburger von Marckenstein-Frauenberg (31 May 1921 – 22 April 2006), better known by her stage name Alida Valli, or simply Valli, was an Italian actress who appeared in more than 100 films in a 70-year career, spanning from the 1930s to the early 2000s. She was one of the biggest stars of Italian film during the Fascist era, once being called "the most beautiful woman in the world" by Benito Mussolini, and was internationally successful post-World War II.

Valli worked with many significant directors both in Italy and abroad, including Alfred Hitchcock (The Paradine Case; 1947), Carol Reed (The Third Man; 1949), Luchino Visconti (Senso; 1954), Michelangelo Antonioni (Il Grido; 1957), Georges Franju (Eyes Without a Face; 1960), Pier Paolo Pasolini (Oedipus Rex; 1967), Mario Bava (Lisa and the Devil; 1972), Bernardo Bertolucci (1900, 1976; La Luna; 1979), and Dario Argento (Suspiria; 1977). Within her lifetime, Valli was invested a Knight of the Italian Republic, and received the Lifetime Achievement Golden Lion at the 1997 Venice Film Festival for her contributions to cinema.

== Early life and family ==
Valli was born in Pola, Istria, Italy (today Pula, Croatia). She was christened Freiin Altenburger von Marckenstein-Frauenberg. Valli had both Italian and Slovene roots. Valli's father, Gino Altenburger, was a son of the Baron Luigi Altenburger (also spelled Altempurger), an Italian from Trento, a descendant of the Counts d'Arco; her paternal grandmother was Elisa Tomasi from Trent, Italy, a cousin of the Roman senator Ettore Tolomei. Valli's mother, Silvia Oberecker Della Martina, born in Pola, was first piano teacher of Slovenian pianist and composer Mirca Župnek Sancin, who was a "culturally sophisticated" housewife of half-Slovene and half-Italian descent. Valli's mother was the daughter of Felix Oberecker (also spelled Obrekar) from Laibach, Austria (now Ljubljana, Slovenia) and Virginia Della Martina from Pola in Istria (then part of Austria). Valli's maternal granduncle, Rodolfo, was a close friend of the famed Italian poet, playwright, orator, journalist, aristocrat, and army officer, Gabriele D'Annunzio.

Valli grew up multilingual, speaking Slovene, Italian, and German. She was also fluent in Serbo-Croatian, French, and English. In European films with international casts, she routinely spoke her dialogue in the language of the actors opposite her and then dubbed herself (usually in Italian) for the soundtrack.

== Career ==
Intellectually gifted, at fifteen Valli travelled to Rome, where she attended the Centro Sperimentale di Cinematografia, the oldest school for film actors and directors in Western Europe and still one of the most prestigious. At that time, she lived with her cousin Ettore Tolomei. Valli started her movie career in 1934, in Il cappello a tre punte (The Three Cornered Hat) during the so-called Telefoni Bianchi cinema era. Her first big success came with the movie Mille lire al mese (1939). After many roles in a large number of comedies, she earned her success as a dramatic actress in Piccolo mondo antico (1941), directed by Mario Soldati, for which she won a special Best Actress award at the Venice Film Festival. During the Second World War, she starred in many movies, including Stasera niente di nuovo (1942) (whose song "Ma l'amore no" became the leitmotif of the Italian forties) and the diptych Noi Vivi / Addio Kira! (1943) (based on Ayn Rand's novel We the Living). These latter two movies were nearly censored by the Italian government under Benito Mussolini, but they were finally permitted because the novel upon which they were based was anti-Soviet. The films were successful, and the public easily realised that they were as much against fascism as communism. After several weeks, however, the films were pulled from theatres as the German and Italian governments, which found out the story, as well as anti-Soviet, also carried an anti-fascist message.

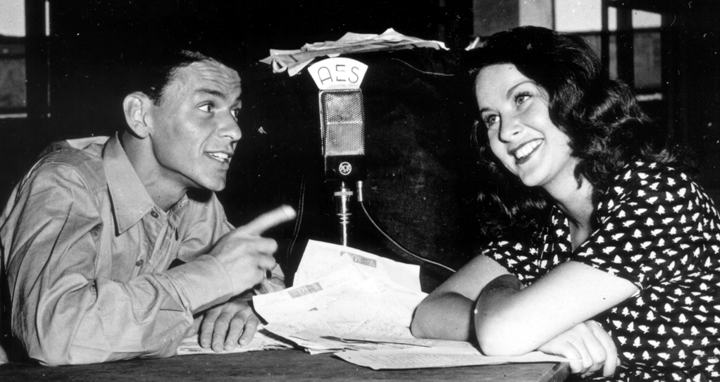
Frank Sinatra and Valli, circa 1940s

By her early 20s, Valli was internationally recognized for her beauty and had a career in English-language films. She was signed to a contact by film executive David Selznick, who signed her to a contract, thinking he had found a second Ingrid Bergman. In Hollywood, she performed in great successes and memorable movies, in Alfred Hitchcock's The Paradine Case (1947) with Gregory Peck; with Fred MacMurray and Frank Sinatra (in his first non-musical performance), in The Miracle of the Bells (1948); alongside Orson Welles and Joseph Cotten in Carol Reed's The Third Man (1949), regarded as one of the best movies ever made worldwide and the British Film Institute selection as the greatest British film of all time; and again with Cotten in Walk Softly, Stranger (1950). Through these and other films, she gained international renown, often credited with the cursive word Valli, which would become her characteristic 'wordmark' in America "to make her sound even more exotic." In 1951, she complained that she disliked the single-name reference. "I feel silly going around with only one name," she said. "People get me mixed up with Rudy Vallée." The actress could not tolerate the strict rules of Selznick, who imposed total control on his actors, and managed to gain her contract's rescission, though with the payment of a high penalty.

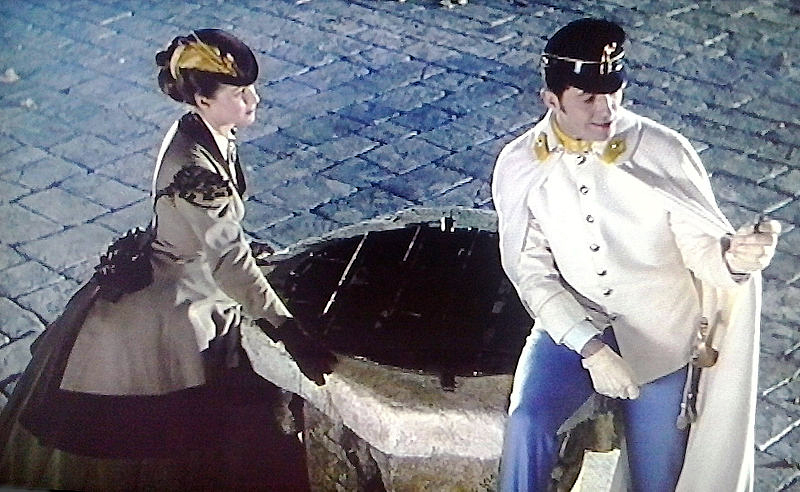
Alida Valli with Farley Granger, scene from the film Senso, 1954

She returned to Europe in the early 1950s and starred in many French and Italian films. In 1954, she had great success in the melodrama Senso, directed by Luchino Visconti. In that film, set in mid-19th-century Venice during the Risorgimento, she played a Venetian countess torn between patriotic ideals and an adulterous love for an officer (played by Farley Granger) of the occupying Austrian forces.

In 1956, Valli decided to stop making movies, concentrating instead on the stage. She managed a theatrical company that produced Broadway plays in Italy.

She appeared in Georges Franju's horror film Eyes Without a Face (1959) with Pierre Brasseur. From the 1960s, she worked in several pictures with prominent directors, such as Pier Paolo Pasolini's Oedipus Rex (1967); Bernardo Bertolucci's The Spider's Stratagem (TV movie, 1970); Bernardo Bertolucci's Novecento (1976); Dario Argento's Suspiria (1977); and Giuseppe Bertolucci's Berlinguer, I Love You (1977), as the mother of the main character played by Roberto Benigni in his film debut. Her final movie role was in Semana Santa (2002), with Mira Sorvino. In Italy, she was also well known for her stage appearances in such plays as Henrik Ibsen's Rosmersholm; Luigi Pirandello's Henry IV; John Osborne's Epitaph for George Dillon; and Arthur Miller's A View from the Bridge. At the 54th Venice International Film Festival in 1997 Alida Valli obtained the Golden Lion award for her career.

== Personal life ==
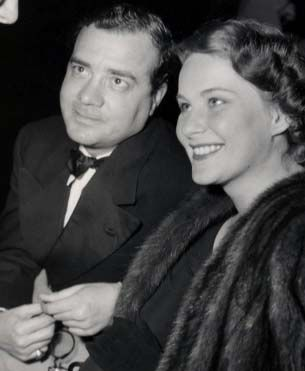
Oscar de Mejo and Valli

Her teenage love, Carlo Cugnasca, was a famous Italian aerobatic pilot. He served as a fighter pilot with the Regia Aeronautica and was killed during a mission over British-held Tobruk on 14 April 1941.

Valli married Oscar de Mejo in 1943 and filed for divorce from him in 1949, but they reconciled. They had two sons together before their marriage ended in divorce in 1952 and she returned to Italy. She married Italian film director Giancarlo Zagni in the early 1960s, divorcing in 1970.

Valli's movie career suffered in 1953 from a scandal surrounding the death of Wilma Montesi, whose body was found on a public beach near Ostia. Prolonged investigations resulted, involving allegations of drug and sex orgies in Roman society. Among the accused – all of whom were acquitted, leaving the case unsolved – was Valli's lover, jazz musician Piero Piccioni (son of the Italian Minister of Foreign Affairs).

During her lifetime, Valli received an honorary doctorate from the Roma Tre University, as well as the titles of Chevalier des Arts et des Lettres of France and Knight of the Italian Republic.

== Death ==
Valli's death at her home on 22 April 2006 was announced by the office of the mayor of Rome, Walter Veltroni. The critic David Shipman wrote in his book The Great Movie Stars: The International Years that, based on her best-known films before 1950, she might seem to be "one of Hollywood's least successful continental imports", but a viewer of "any two or three of the films she has made since then ... will probably regard her as one of the half-dozen best actresses in the world". The French critic Frédéric Mitterrand wrote: "[She] was the only actress in Europe to equal Marlene Dietrich or Greta Garbo".

== Filmography ==
=== Film ===
Year	Title	Role	Notes
1935	The Three-Cornered Hat		Uncredited
1936	The Two Sergeants	Una commessa dell'emporio 'Au Bon Marché'	as Alida Altenburger
1937	It Was I!	Lauretta	
1937	The Ferocious Saladin	Dora Florida / La bella Sulamita	
1938	A Lady Did It	Maria Sardo	
1938	L'amor mio non muore!	Maria D'Alba	
1938	The House of Shame	La ragazza	
1939	A Thousand Lire a Month	Magda	
1939	Unjustified Absence	Vera Fabbri	
1939	The Castle Ball	Greta Larsen	
1940	Manon Lescaut	Manon Lescaut	
1940	Red Tavern	Susanna Sormani	
1940	The Last Enemy	A friend of Anna	
1940	Beyond Love	Vanina Vanini	
1940	The First Woman Who Passes	Gabrielle de Vervins	
1941	Piccolo mondo antico	Luisa Rigey Maironi	
1941	Light in the Darkness	Marina Ferri	
1941	Schoolgirl Diary	Anna Campolmi	
1941	The Secret Lover	Renata Croci	
1942	We the Living	Kira Argounova	
1942	Invisible Chains	Elena Silvagni	
1942	The Two Orphans	Enrichetta	
1942	Addio Kira	Kira Argounova	
1942	Nothing New Tonight	Maria	
1943	Laugh, Pagliacci	Giulia	
1943	I'll Always Love You	Adriana	
1943	Apparition	Andreina	
1944	The Za-Bum Circus		segments "Gelosia", "Il postino" and "Galop finale al circo"
1945	Il canto della vita	Patrizia Martini	
1945	Life Begins Anew	Giovanna	
1946	Eugenia Grandet	Eugenia Grandet	
1947	The Paradine Case	Maddalena Anna Paradine	
1948	The Miracle of the Bells	Olga	
1949	The Third Man	Anna Schmidt	
1950	The White Tower	Carla Alton	
1950	Walk Softly, Stranger	Elaine Corelli	
1951	Miracles Only Happen Once	Claudia	
1951	Last Meeting	Lina Castelli	
1953	Lovers of Toledo	Doña Inés de Arévalo Blas	
1953	The World Condemns Them	Renata Giustini	
1953	We, the Women	Alida	Segment: "Alida Valli"
1954	The Stranger's Hand	Roberta Gleukovitch	
1954	Senso	La contessa Livia Serpieri	
1957	Il Grido	Irma	
1957	This Angry Age	Claude	
1957	The Wide Blue Road	Rosetta	
1958	The Night Heaven Fell	Florentine	
1958	L'amore più bello	Carolina	
1959	Signé Arsène Lupin	Aurélia Valéano	
1960	Treno di Natale		
1960	Eyes Without a Face	Louise	
1960	Dialogue of the Carmelites	Mère Thérèse de Saint-Augustin	
1960	The Gigolo	Agathe	
1960	Il peccato degli anni verdi	Elena's mother	
1961	The Long Absence	Thérèse Langlois	
1961	The Happy Thieves	Duchess Blanca	
1961	La fille du torrent	Livia Boissière	
1962	Disorder	Carlo's Mother	
1962	Al otro lado de la ciudad		
1962	Homage at Siesta Time	Constance Fischer	
1963	A la salida		
1963	Ophelia	Claudia Lesurf	
1963	The Castilian	Reina Teresa	
1963	The Paper Man	La Italiana	
1963	Una cara para escapar		
1964	L'Autre Femme	Annabel	
1965	Black Humor	The Widow	segment: "La vedova"
1967	Edipo re	Merope	
1970	The Mushroom	Linda Benson	
1970	The Spider's Stratagem	Draifa	
1972	Eye in the Labyrinth	Gerda	
1972	Indian Summer	Marcella Abati - Vanina's mother	
1973	Lisa and the Devil	Countess	
1973	Diario di un italiano	Olga	
1974	Lola	Louise	
1974	Tender Dracula	Héloïse	
1974	The Antichrist	Irene	
1975	La Chair de l'orchidée	La folle de la gare	
1975	Cher Victor	Anne	
1975	Il caso Raoul	Elsa	
1976	Novecento	Signora Pioppi	
1976	Le jeu du solitaire	Germaine	
1976	The Cassandra Crossing	Nanny	
1977	Suspiria	Miss Tanner	
1977	A Simple Heart	Mrs. Obin	
1977	Berlinguer, I Love You	Mrs. Cioni	
1978	Porco mondo	Teresina	
1978	The Perfect Crime	Lady Clementine De Revere	
1979	Zoo zéro	Yvonne, la mère	
1979	Killer Nun	Mother Superior	
1979	La luna	Giuseppe's Mother	
1979	Licanthropus, il figlio della notte		
1980	Inferno	Carol, the caretaker	
1980	Aquella casa en las afueras	Isabel	
1980	Puppenspiel mit toten Augen		
1981	Peacetime in Paris		
1981	The Fall of the Rebel Angels	Bettina	
1982	Aspern	Juliana Bartes	
1982	Sogni mostruosamente proibiti	Marina's mother	
1985	Secrets Secrets	Gina	
1987	Le jupon rouge	Bacha	
1988	À notre regrettable époux	Catarina	
1991	La bocca	Countess Bianca Rospigliosi	
1991	The Party's Over	Clara	
1993	The Long Silence	Carla's Mother	
1993	Bugie rosse	Caterina, Andrea's mother	
1995	A Month by the Lake	Signora Fascioli	
1996	Fatal Frames	Countess Alessandra Mirafiori	
1999	The Sweet Sounds of Life	Sofia's grandmother	
2000	Vino santo	Sveva	
2001	Probably Love	Alida Valli	
2002	Semana santa	Doña Catalina	Final film role

=== Television ===
- I Figli di Medea (1959) as Medea / Alida Valli
- Il caso Mauritius (1961)
- Combat! as Marie (Episode: "Doughboy", 1963)
- Desencuentro (series, 1964)
- Rome Will Never Leave You, three episodes of Dr. Kildare (1964) as Luisa Brabante
- Il consigliere imperiale (1974)
- Les grandes conjurations: Le tumulte d'Amboise (1978)
- L'altro Simenon (series, 1979)
- L'eredità della priora (serial, 1980) as Priora
- Dramma d'amore (serial, 1983)
- Piccolo mondo antico (serial, 1989) as La marchesa Maironi
- Una vita in gioco 2 (serial, 1992)
- Delitti privati (1992) as Matilde Pierboni

== Theatre ==
- La casa dei Rosmer (1956) Henrik Ibsen (aka Rosmersholm)
- L'uomo, la bestia e la virtù (1956), Luigi Pirandello
- Gli innocenti (1956), William Archibald
- Enrico IV (1958), Luigi Pirandello
- Il sole e la luna (1965), Guglielmo Biraghi
- Epitaffo per George Dillon (1966), John Osborne and Anthony Creighton (Epitaph for George Dillon)
- Uno sguardo dal ponte (1967), Arthur Miller (A View from the Bridge)
- La bambolona (1968), Raf Vallone
- Il dio Kurt (1969), Alberto Moravia
- I parenti terribili (1969), Jean Cocteau (Les parents terribles)
- LSD-Lei, scusi, divorzierebbe? (1970), Carlo Maria Pensa
- Uno sporco egoista (1971), Francois Dorin
- Lulu (Lo spirito della terra – Il vaso di Pandora) (1972), Frank Wedekind (Lulu [Erdgeist-Die Büchse der Pandora])
- Le massacre à Paris (1972), Christopher Marlowe (The Massacre at Paris)
- Il Gabbiano (1973), Anton Cechov
- L'uomo che incontrò de stesso (1981), Luigi Antonelli
- La Venexiana (1981), Anonimo del Cinquecento
- La fiaccola sotto il moggio (1981), Gabriele d'Annunzio
- Ekaterina Ivanovna (1983), Leonid Andreev
- Il malinteso (1984), Albert Camus (Le malentendu)
- Romeo e Giulietta (1985), William Shakespeare (Romeo and Juliet)
- A porte chiuse, da Sartre a Mishima (1986), di Jean-Paul Sartre e Yukio Mishima (Huis clos – Aoi – Hanjo)
- La città morta (1988), Gabriele D'Annunzio
- La nave (1988), Gabriele D'Annunzio
- I paraventi (1990), Jean Genet (Les paravents)
- Improvvisamente l'estate scorsa (1991), Tennessee Williams (Suddenly Last Summer)
- Più grandiose dimore (1993), Eugene O'Neill
- Così è (se vi pare) (1994), Luigi Pirandello
- Questa sera si recita a soggetto (1995), Luigi Pirandello

== Radio appearances ==
Year	Programme	Episode/source
1948	Lux Radio Theatre	The Miracle of the Bells

Lux Radio Theatre broadcast "The Paradine Case" in a radio adaptation of the film on 9 May 1949, starring Joseph Cotten, with Alida Valli and Louis Jourdan reprising their roles.
