= 1. =

1. is the ordinal form of the number one in a number of European languages.

1. may also refer to:

== Association football ==
=== Austria ===
- 1. FC Vöcklabruck, a defunct Austrian association football club

=== Czech Republic ===
- 1. FC Karlovy Vary, a Czech association football club
- 1. FC Slovácko, a Czech association football club

=== Germany ===
- 1. FC Aschersleben, a German association football club
- 1. FC Bad Kötzting, a German association football club
- 1. FC Bamberg, a defunct German association football club
- 1. FC Bocholt, a German association football club
- 1. FC Breslau, a defunct German association football club
- 1. FC Burg, a German association football club
- 1. FC Eschborn, a German association football club
- 1. FC Gera 03, a German association football club
- 1. FC Germania 08 Ober-Roden, a German association football club
- 1. FC Haßfurt, a German association football club
- 1. FC Heidenheim, a German association football club
- 1. FC Kaiserslautern, a German association football club
- 1. FC Kleve, a German association football club
- 1. FC Köln, a German association football club
- 1. FC Lichtenfels, a German association football club
- 1. FC Lokomotive Leipzig, a German association football club
- 1. FC Lok Stendal, a German association football club
- 1. FC Magdeburg, a German association football club
- 1. FC Mülheim, a German association football club
- 1. Münchner FC 1896, a defunct German association football club
- 1. FC Neubrandenburg 04, a German association football club
- 1. FC Normannia Gmünd, a German association football club
- 1. FC Nürnberg, a German association football club
- 1. FC Passau, a German association football club
- 1. FC Pforzheim, a defunct German association football club
- 1. Rödelheimer FC 02, a German association football club
- 1. FC Saarbrücken, a German association football club
- 1. FC Sand, a German association football club
- 1. FC Schwalmstadt, a German association football club
- 1. FC Schwandorf, a German association football club
- 1. FC Schweinfurt 05, a German association football club
- 1. FC Sonthofen, a German association football club
- 1. FC Union Berlin, a German association football club
- 1. FC Union Solingen, a German association football club
- 1. FC Viktoria 07 Kelsterbach, a German association football club

=== Hungary ===
- 1. FC Femina, a Hungarian women's association football club

=== Poland ===
- 1. FC Kattowitz, a defunct Polish association football club
- 1. FC Katowice, a Polish association football club

=== Slovakia ===
- 1. FC Tatran Prešov, a Slovak association football club
- 1. Liga (Slovakia)

=== Switzerland ===
- Swiss 1. Liga (football), a Swiss association football league

== Ice hockey ==
- 1. národní hokejová liga, a Czech ice hockey league
- Slovak 1. Liga, a Slovak ice hockey league
- Swiss 1. Liga (ice hockey), a Swiss ice hockey league

== See also ==
- 1. Liga (disambiguation)
- 2. (disambiguation)
