= 2. =

2. is the ordinal form of the number two in a number of European languages.

2. may also refer to:

== Association football ==
- 2. Bundesliga, a German association football league.
  - 2. Bundesliga Nord (1974–81), a defunct division of the 2. Fußball-Bundesliga.
  - 2. Bundesliga Süd (1974–81), a defunct division of the 2. Fußball-Bundesliga.
- 2. Bundesliga (women), a German women's association football league.
- 2. Liga Interregional, a Swiss association football league.
- 2. Liga (Switzerland), a Swiss association football league.
- 2. Liga (Slovakia), a Slovak association football league.

== Ice hockey ==
- 2. národní hokejová liga, a Czech ice hockey league.

== Rugby union ==
- 2. Rugby-Bundesliga
- 2. Rugby Bundesliga (Austria)

== See also ==
- 2. Liga (disambiguation)
- 1. (disambiguation)
