= Liga =

Liga (Spanish and Portuguese: League) or LIGA may refer to:

== Sports ==
=== Basketball ===
- Liga ACB, men's professional basketball league in Spain
- Liga Femenina de Baloncesto, women's professional basketball league in Spain

=== Football ===
==== Latin America ====
- Liga Deportiva Alajuelense, football club from Costa Rica commonly known as "La Liga"
- Liga Deportiva Universitaria, Ecuadorian professional football club based in Quito
- Liga MX, highest professional division of the Mexican men's football league system
- Liga 1 (Peru), highest professional division of the Peruvian men's football league system

==== Romania ====
- Liga I, highest professional division of the Romanian football league system
- Liga Elitelor, a system of youth Romanian football leagues covering the under-17 and under-19 age groups

==== Portugal ====
- Liga Portugal, highest professional division of the Portuguese football league system
- Liga Portugal 2, second highest professional division of the Portuguese football league system
- Liga 3 (Portugal), third highest professional division of the Portuguese football league system

==== Other regions ====
- La Liga, highest professional division of the Spanish men's football league system
- Liga F, highest professional division of the Spanish women's football league system
- Super League (Indonesia), highest professional division of the Indonesian football league system

== People ==
- Līga (name), a Latvian female given name
- Luciano Ligabue, more commonly known as Ligabue or Liga, Italian rock singer-songwriter

== Other uses ==
- Liga (TV channel), a defunct Philippine sports television network
- LIGA, common appellation for the Hungarian national trade union Független Szakszervezetek Demokratikus Ligája or Democratic Confederation of Free Trade Unions
- LIGA, acronym of Lithographie, Galvanoformung, Abformung ("Lithography, Electroplating, and Molding"), fabrication technology used to create high-aspect-ratio microstructures
- L.I.G.A, Danish urban pop trio
- Liga, a hardwood that is carved to form the keys of the gyil musical instrument of the Gur-speaking peoples of Ghana and neighbouring West African nations
- Liga, was another name of the German Catholic League.

== See also ==
- Numbered levels
  - 1. Liga (disambiguation)
  - 2. Liga (disambiguation)
  - 3. Liga (disambiguation)
  - 4. Liga (disambiguation)
  - Liga 1 (disambiguation)
  - Liga 2 (disambiguation)
  - Liga 3 (disambiguation)
- Alternative spellings
  - Druga Liga (disambiguation)
  - League (disambiguation)
  - Lega (disambiguation)
  - Liiga
  - Prva Liga (disambiguation)
  - Superliga (disambiguation)
  - Vysshaya Liga (disambiguation)
