= Liga 1 =

Liga 1 may refer to:

- Super League (Indonesia), the men's top professional division of the Indonesian football league system.
  - Elite Pro Academy, a junior level league of Indonesian Super League
- Liga 1 (Peru), the Peruvian First Division
- Liga I, the Romanian First League
- Moldovan Liga 1, the second-level division of Moldovan Football league system, previously known as Divizia A
- Thai League 1, the men's top professional division of thai football league system

== See also ==
- 1. Liga (disambiguation)
- Prva Liga (disambiguation)
- Liga (disambiguation)
