= Sabbioneta =

Sabbioneta Subiunèda (Emilian)
- Comune
- Comune di Sabbioneta
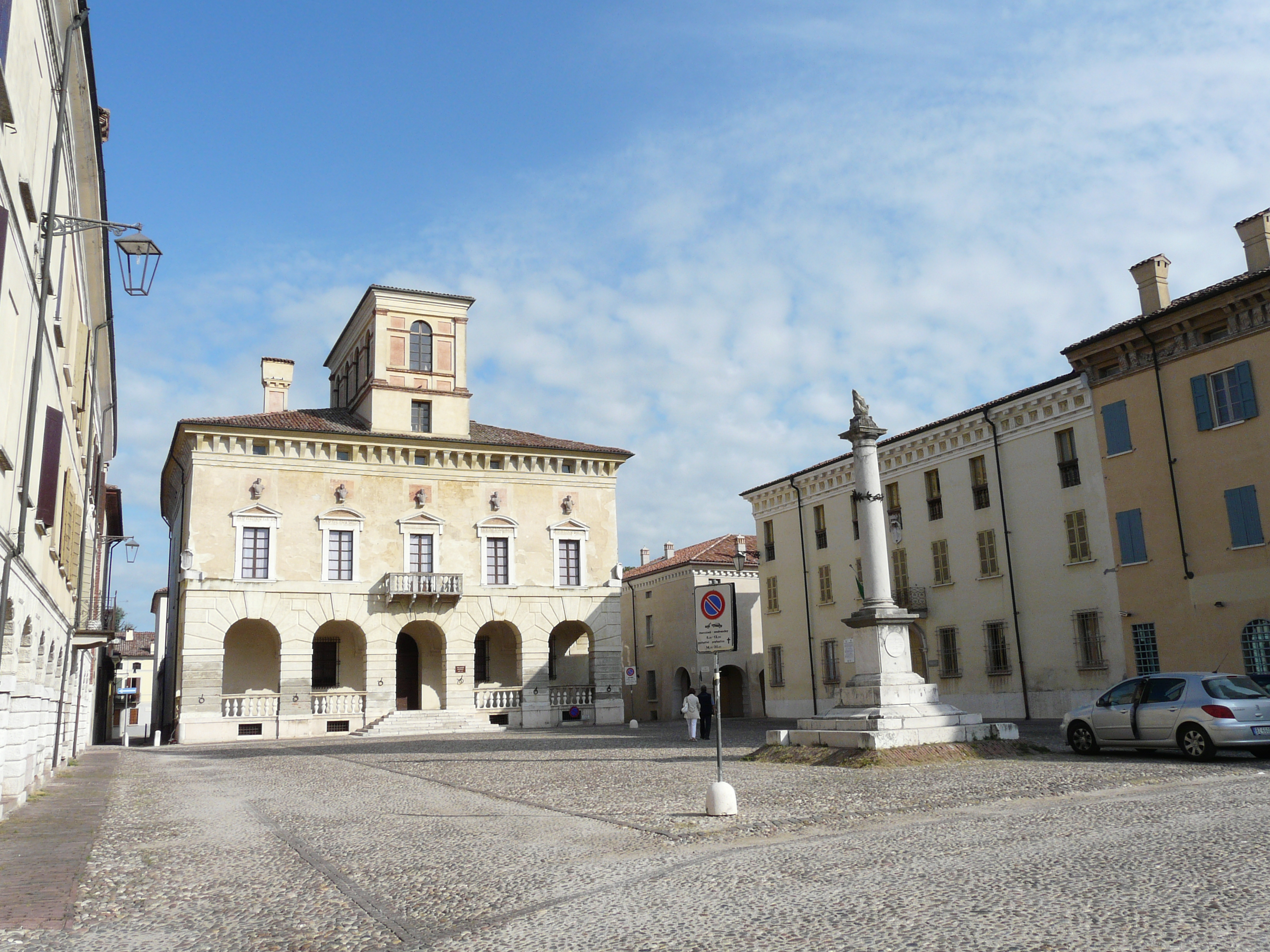
- Piazza and Palazzo Ducale

- Location within Italy Location within Lombardy
- Coordinates: 45.00°N 10.49°E
- Country: Italy
- Region: Lombardy
- Province: Mantua (MN)
- Frazioni: Breda Cisoni, Ca' de Cessi, Commessaggio Inferiore, Ponteterra, Villa Pasquali

Government
  - Mayor: Antonio Beccaria

Area
  - Total: 37 km^{2} (14 sq mi)
- Elevation: 18 m (59 ft)

Population (2018-01-01)
  - Total: 4,260
  - Density: 120/km^{2} (300/sq mi)
- Time zone: UTC+1 (CET)
  - Summer (DST): UTC+2 (CEST)
- Postal code: 46018
- Dialing code: 0375
- Patron saint: San Sebastiano
- Saint day: 20 January
- Website: Official website

UNESCO World Heritage Site
- Part of: Mantua and Sabbioneta
- Criteria: Cultural: (ii)(iii)
- Reference: 1287-002
- Inscription: 2008 (32nd Session)
- Area: 60 ha (150 acres)
- Buffer zone: 430 ha (1,100 acres)

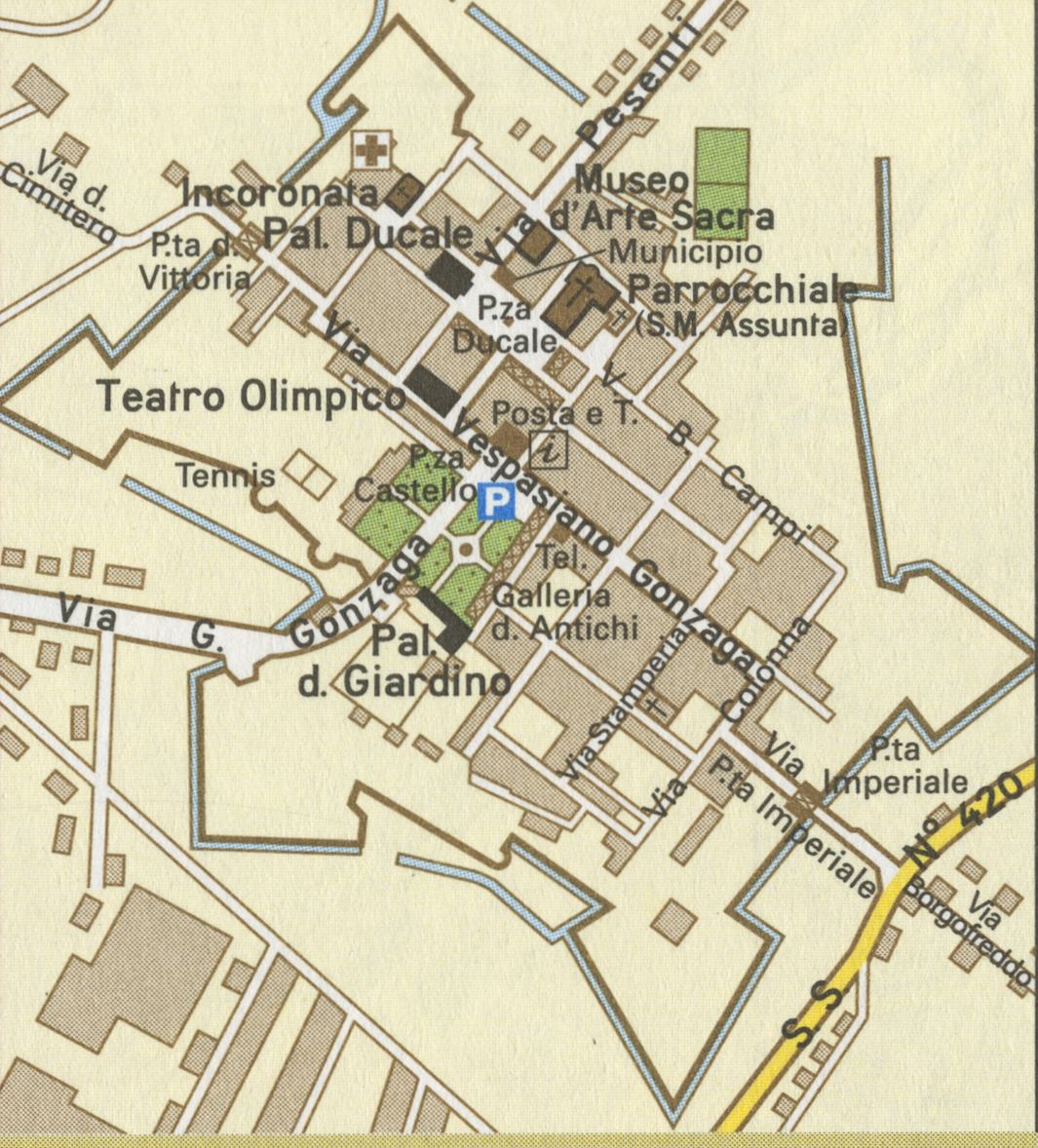
Map of Sabbioneta

Sabbioneta (Casalasco-Viadanese: Subiunèda) is a town and comune in the province of Mantua, Lombardy region, Northern Italy. It is situated about 30 kilometres (19 mi) north of Parma, not far from the northern bank of the Po River. It is one of I Borghi più belli d'Italia ("The most beautiful villages of Italy"). It was inscribed in the World Heritage List in 2008.

== History ==
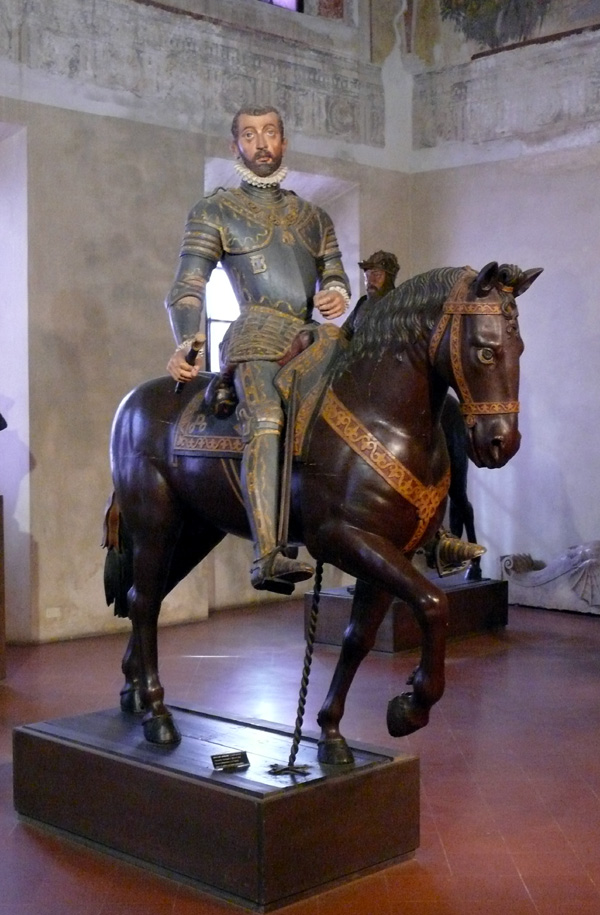
Statue of Vespasiano I Gonzaga.

Sabbioneta was founded by Vespasiano I Gonzaga in the late 16th century along the ancient Roman Via Vitelliana, on a sandy bank of the Po (whence the name, meaning "sandy" in Italian); he was its first duke, using it as a personal fortress and residence.

It was also during this period that it became a minor musical centre; composers such as Benedetto Pallavicino (c. 1551–1601) were employed here by Vespasiano Gonzaga, prior to his moving to the main Gonzaga city of Mantua.

Located on an alluvial ground between the Po and Oglio rivers, as well as along the route of the ancient Via Vitelliana, it occupied a strategic position in the heart of the Po Valley. For Vespasiano Gonzaga, Sabbioneta was to be above all a fortress and, at that time, the power of its walls certainly made it one of the most well-equipped bulwarks in Lombardy of Spanish domination.

Sabbioneta was above all the capital of a small state placed between great regional states: the Duchy of Milan to the west, ruled at that time by the Spanish governorate; the Duchy of Mantua to the east, over the River Oglio, governed by ancient line of the Gonzaga, cousins of Vespasiano; the Duchy of Parma and Piacenza to the south of Po, under the domain of Farnese family, supportive of Gonzaga himself.

The territory of the small state of Sabbioneta was mainly concentrated in the eastern extremity of the diocese of Cremona and it represented a necessary crossroads both for trade midway along the Po and for communications between the lowlands of Brescia and Emilia Romagna. The most prosperous period in the history of this city was in its reconstruction years, in which it was under the dominion of Prince Vespasiano I Gonzaga, which also became his residence. Sabbioneta has been honored with the "orange flag" eulogy of the Touring Club of Italy.

== Main Sights ==
The territory features the church of St. Anthony Abbot in the district of Villa Pasquali, designed by Ferdinando Galli-Bibbiena and built by his son Antonio Galli, and the small sanctuary of the Blessed Virgin Mary in Vigoreto that in ancient times was annexed to the convent of the Capuchins. Outside the gunnel city, the district banks of Vespasiano I Gonzaga are also reported: a system of artificial raised parts that enclose the city of Sabbioneta and a wide part of the adjacent council territory, marking a vast ring-like circuit of about twenty kilometers. In 2008, Sabbioneta was inscribed in the UNESCO World Heritage List as a recognition of its perfect example of practical application of Renaissance urban planning theories.

Sabbioneta is also known for its historic Jewish Ghetto and its synagogue, and in particular for its Hebrew printing-press. In 1551 Tobias Foa set up the press; he had, however, published certain "anti-Christian books" and his career was "forcibly ended". His work and possibly his type were taken up by a Christian printer, Vicenzo Conte.

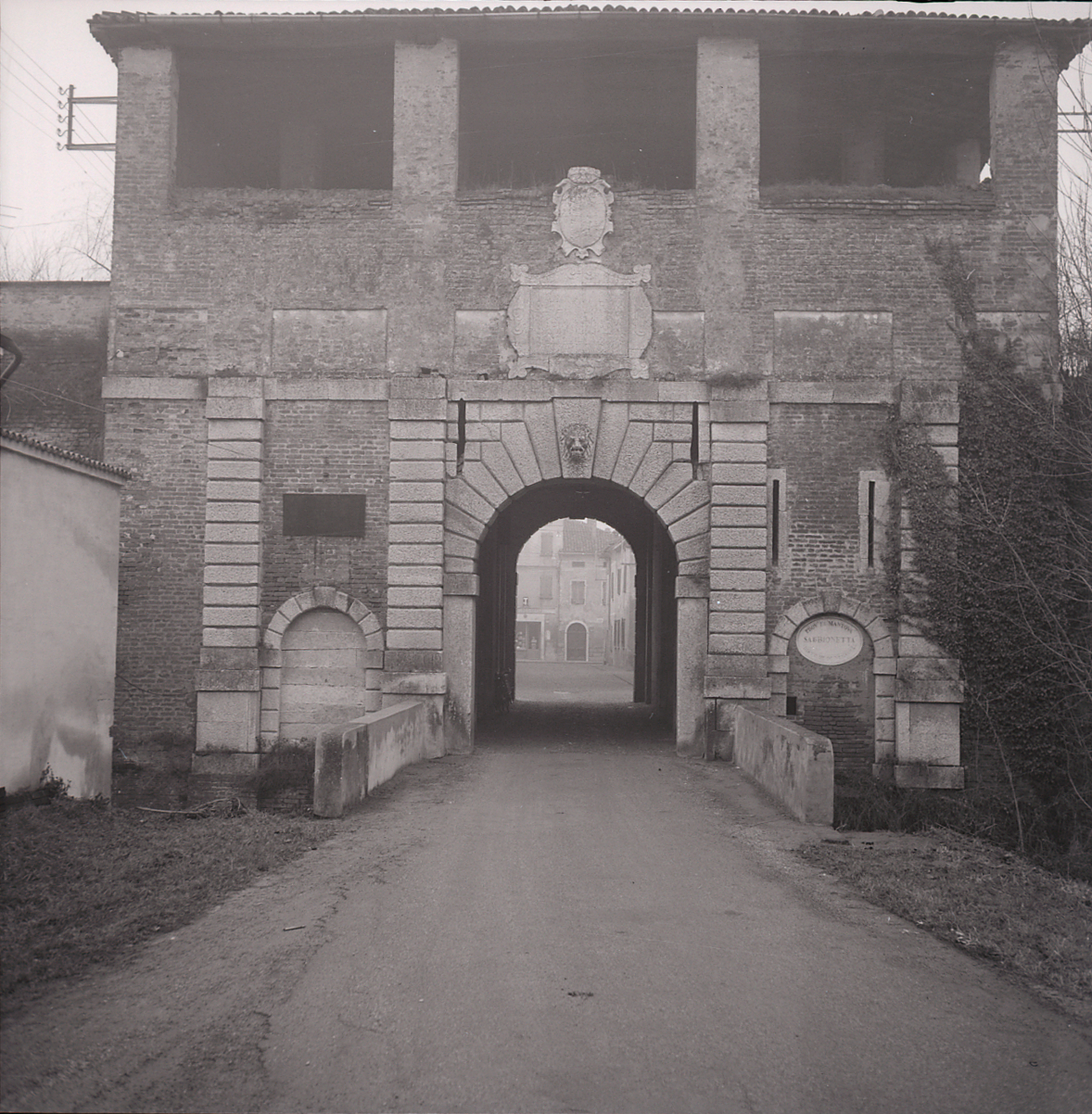
Porta Vittoria, photographed by Paolo Monti, 1965.

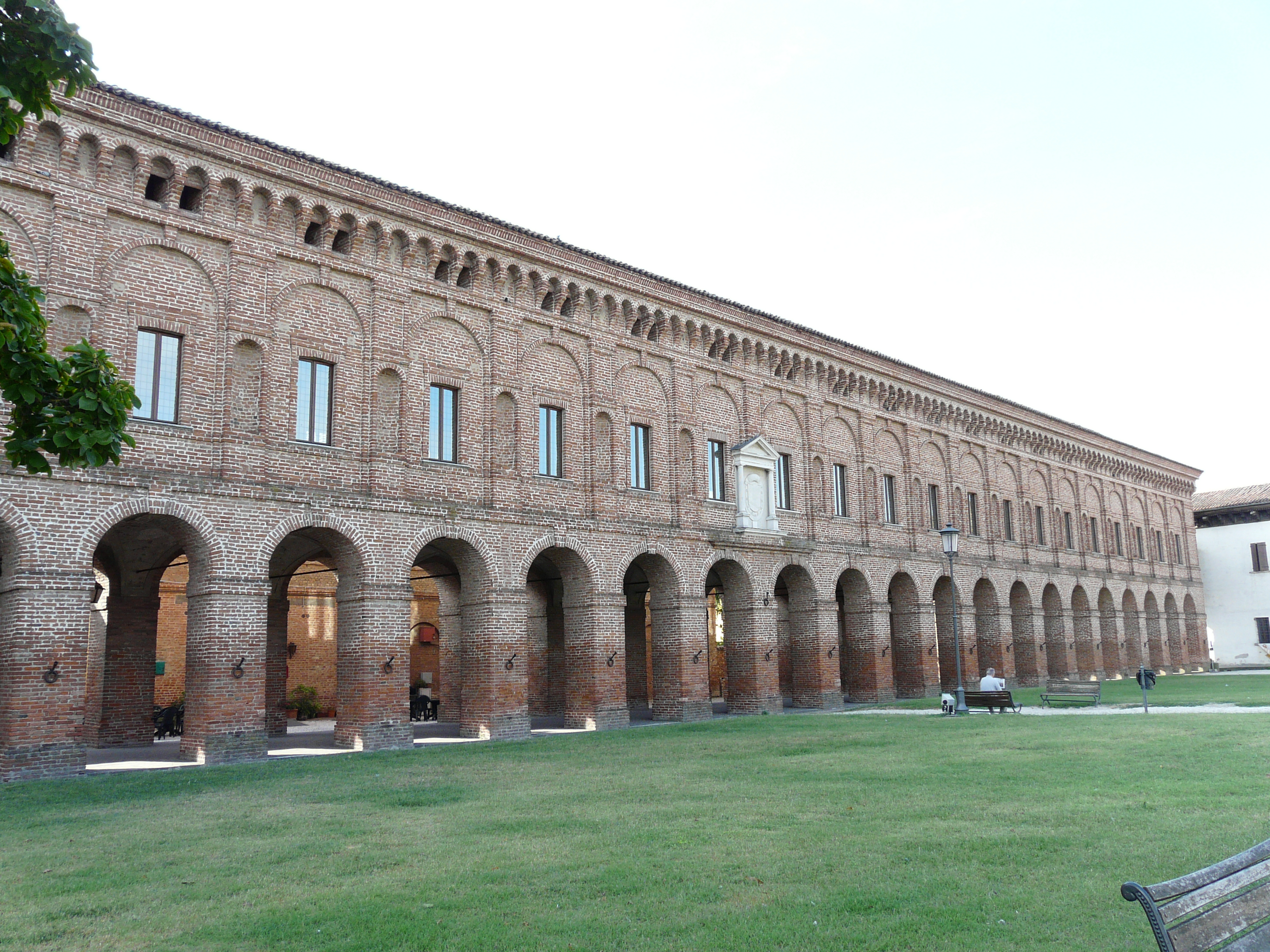
Galleria degli Antichi

Vespasiano Gonzaga's town, designed according to the Renaissance principles of the Ideal City, included:

- The Ducal Palace (now the Town Hall)
- The Teatro all'antica ("Theatre in the style of the Ancients"), designed by Vincenzo Scamozzi
- The Galleria degli Antichi and Palazzo del Giardino: "Gallery of Antiquities" and "Garden Palace" respectively.)
- Churches of the Assunta and Carmine
- Chiesa della Beata Vergine Incoronata

The church and the summer palace contain frescoes by artists of the Campi family of Cremona.

== World Heritage Site ==
On 7 July 2008, Sabbioneta, together with Mantua was declared by UNESCO to be a World Heritage Site due to its exceptional nature as a newly founded city built in just over 30 years by the will of Prince Vespasiano I Gonzaga. According to UNESCO, Sabbioneta represents a perfect example of the application of Renaissance theories on how an ideal city should be designed.

The vicissitudes that immediately occurred after the death of Vespasiano, especially the long-standing question of the succession of the small duchy, which divided the heirs for almost a century, as well as the Austrian dominion first and the Napoleonic one later, deprived the city of important buildings, such as the fortress, the armoury and the lunettes placed outside the city wall.

Pillage and confiscation deprived the city of some prestigious features, firstly, the confiscation of the antique collection to the Academy of Mantua in 1772 by the Teresian decree and the burning of the Sala dei Cavalli in the Palazzo Ducale in 1815. The church heritage remains conspicuous, promoted and redeveloped by a policy of recovery and enhancement over the last 25 years.

== References in Art ==
According to the American lawyer and writer Richard Paul Roe, the play A Midsummer Night's Dream by William Shakespeare was not set in Athens but in Sabbioneta, known as "little Athens" ever since its foundation.

== Cinema and Television ==
In 1970, The Spider's Stratagem by Bernardo Bertolucci was filmed in Sabbioneta. In the film, the village takes on the imaginary name of Tara. Inside the Gallery of the Ancients and in some rooms of the Palace Garden, some scenes of 'Tis Pity She's a Whore, were filmed in 1971. More recently (1980s) in Sabbioneta the shooting of the RAI television show I Promessi Sposi ('The Betrothed') was also filmed: in particular, amid the columns of the Gallery of the Ancients, scenes of the plague were shot.

Also for the French film Marquise, released in 1997 under the direction of Véra Belmont, some scenes were shot in Sabbioneta, as well as for the 1999 film Amore nello specchio by Salvatore Maira, in which the Teatro all'Antica was used.

The second season of the television series I Medici, broadcast in 2018, used Sabbioneta in some scenes to represent Renaissance Florence.

== Sources ==
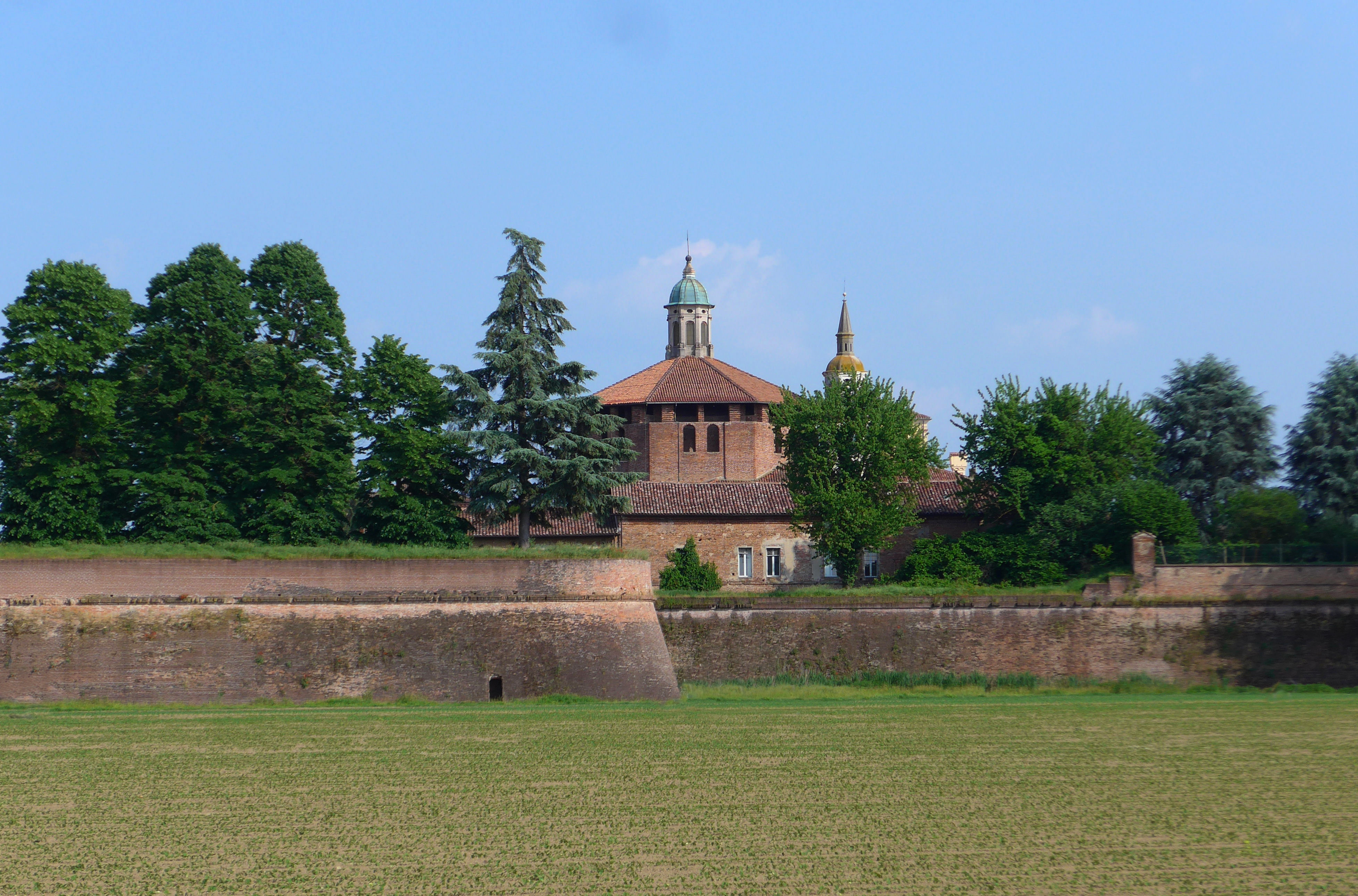
Sabbioneta

- Vespasiano Gonzaga Colonna duca di Sabbioneta e cavaliere del Toson d'oro. Sabbioneta. (2001).
- Luca Sarzi Amadè, Il duca di Sabbioneta: Guerre e amori di un europeo del XVI secolo ...

Paperback: 332 pages; Publisher: SugarCo (1990); ISBN 88-7198-040-9

- Vespasiano Gonzaga e il ducato di Sabbioneta, [actes de la conferència, Sabbioneta-Mantova, 12-13 ottobre 1991], a cura de U. Bazzotti, Mantova (1993).
- L. Ventura, Il collezionismo di un principe: la raccolta di marmi di Vespasiano Gonzaga Colonna, (Modena), (1997).
- Vespasiano Gonzaga Colonna 1531-1591: l'uomo e le opere, actes del congrés d'estudis, Teatro olimpico di Sabbioneta, 5 de juny, 1999; a cura de E. Asinari, [Casalmaggiore] (1999).
