= Pippo Campanini =

Italian actor

Pippo Campanini (born 1907, date of death unknown) was an Italian actor. In 1970 he starred in Bernardo Bertolucci's The Spider's Stratagem and in 1976 also appeared in Bertolucci's 1900.
