= 1900 (film) =

1976 film

- U.S. theatrical release poster
- Directed by: Bernardo Bertolucci
- Screenplay by: Franco Arcalli; Giuseppe Bertolucci; Bernardo Bertolucci
- Produced by: Alberto Grimaldi
- Starring: Robert De Niro; Gérard Depardieu; Dominique Sanda; Laura Betti; Werner Bruhns; Stefania Casini; Sterling Hayden; Anna Henkel-Grönemeyer; Ellen Schwiers; Alida Valli; Romolo Valli; Stefania Sandrelli; Donald Sutherland; Burt Lancaster
- Cinematography: Vittorio Storaro
- Edited by: Franco Arcalli
- Music by: Ennio Morricone
- Production companies: Produzioni Europee Associati (PEA); Les Productions Artistes Associés; Artemis Film
- Distributed by: 20th Century-Fox (Italy); United Artists (France and West Germany)
- Release dates: 21 May 1976 (Cannes); 28 August 1976 (Venice); 3 September 1976 (Part 1); 24 September 1976 (Part 2)
- Running time: 317 minutes; 162 minutes (Part 1); 154 minutes (Part 2); 247 minutes (Edited version)
- Countries: Italy; France; West Germany
- Languages: Italian; French; German; English
- Budget: $8 million

1900 (Italian: Novecento, "Twentieth Century") is a 1976 epic historical drama film directed by Bernardo Bertolucci, and featuring an international ensemble cast including Robert De Niro, Gérard Depardieu, Dominique Sanda, Francesca Bertini, Laura Betti, Stefania Casini, Ellen Schwiers, Sterling Hayden, Alida Valli, Romolo Valli, Stefania Sandrelli, Donald Sutherland and Burt Lancaster. Set in Bertolucci's ancestral region of Emilia, Italy, the film chronicles the lives and friendship of two men—the landowning Alfredo Berlinghieri (De Niro) and the peasant Olmo Dalcò (Depardieu)—as they witness and participate in the political conflicts between fascism and communism that took place in Italy in the first half of the 20th century. The film premiered out of competition at the 1976 Cannes Film Festival.

With a runtime of 317 minutes in its original version, 1900 is known for being one of the longest commercially released films in history. Its great length led to it being presented in two parts when originally released in many countries, including Italy, East and West Germany, Denmark, Belgium, Norway, Sweden, Colombia, Pakistan and Japan. In other countries, including the United States, a single edited version of the film was released. 1900 has become widely regarded as a cult classic, and has received several special-edition home-video releases from a variety of distributors. A restoration of the film premiered out of competition at the 74th Venice International Film Festival in 2017.

In 2008, the film was included on the Italian Ministry of Cultural Heritage's 100 Italian films to be saved, a list of 100 films that "have changed the collective memory of the country between 1942 and 1978".

== Plot ==
In 1945, Italy is liberated from the fascists. On an estate in the Emilia-Romagna region, the peasants seek to join the partisans and place the owner, Alfredo Berlinghieri, under arrest. Attempting to flee, a middle-aged man named Attila and a woman named Regina face an attack by women laborers wielding pitchforks.

Alfredo and Olmo Dalcò, both born in 1901, come from opposite ends of the social spectrum. Alfredo, from a family of wealthy landowners, grows up with his cousin Regina, while Olmo, an illegitimate peasant, is raised by his grandfather Leo, the foreman and peasants' spokesman. Despite their differences, Alfredo, somewhat rebellious against his family's pretentious hypocrisy, befriends Olmo, who is raised as a socialist. During their childhood, Leo leads strikes against unfair conditions on the farm, and the two friends spend much time together.

In 1917, Olmo enlists in the Royal Italian Army for World War I, while Alfredo learns to run the family's plantation. After Olmo's return, their friendship continues, but changes occur. Giovanni, Alfredo's father and the new padrone, hires Attila Mellanchini, a fascist foreman who cruelly treats estate employees.

In 1922, Olmo, in a relationship with Anita, leads protests for workers' rights. Giovanni's death leads to Alfredo becoming the new padrone, and he marries Ada. During winter 1935, Alfredo proves to be a weak leader, bending to the ruling National Fascist Party. Ada's growing alcoholism reflects the emptiness of their marriage. Meanwhile, Olmo's wife Anita dies during childbirth, leaving their daughter Anita supportive of her father's socialist beliefs.

As Olmo becomes a leader among poor farmers, clashes with Attila intensify. Attila's psychopathic tendencies lead to atrocities, and the peasants retaliate, humiliating him. Alfredo fires Attila, but Ada has already left Alfredo. After World War II, the power shifts and local nobility face repercussions.

Attila and Regina, apprehended, are imprisoned in the Berlinghieri pigsty, and Attila confesses his murders before being executed. Olmo returns to witness Alfredo's trial before a workers' tribunal. Accused of letting workers suffer, Alfredo is sentenced to death, but is saved when Olmo declares the padrone dead, symbolizing the overthrow of the social system.

The new government's representatives and soldiers arrive, urging the peasants to surrender their arms. Olmo convinces them, but he and Alfredo suggest that the class system will persist.

In their senior years, the elderly Alfredo and Olmo playfully tackle each other. On arising, they walk along a railroad track that they frequented as boys. Alfredo lies down on the tracks, mimicking a childhood activity of theirs. The train passes over him, reminiscent of their childhood game.

== Cast ==
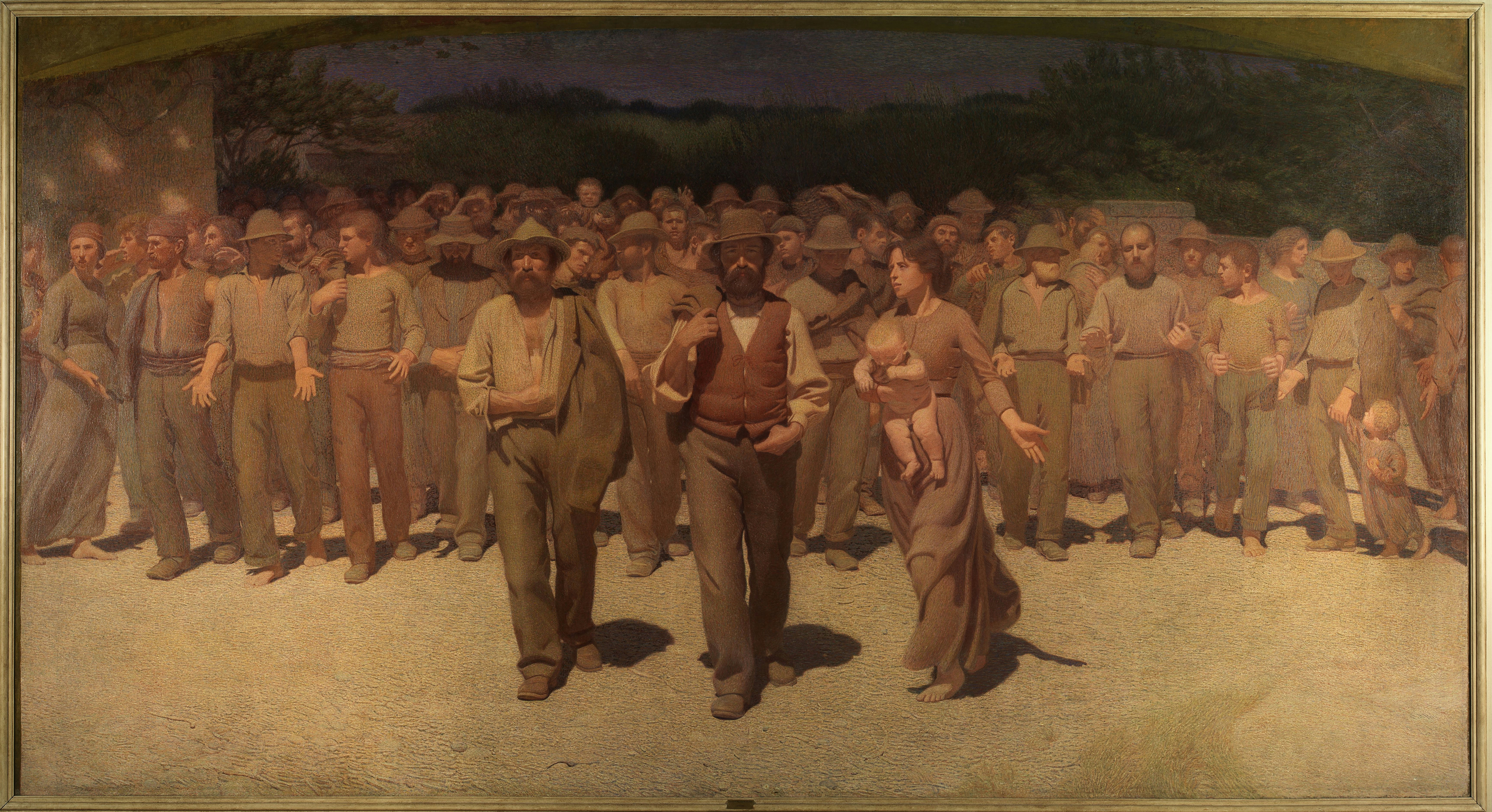
The initial credits are displayed over a zoom out of Giuseppe Pellizza da Volpedo's The Fourth Estate.

- Robert De Niro as Alfredo Berlinghieri
  - Paolo Pavesi as young Alfredo
- Gérard Depardieu as Olmo Dalcò
  - Roberto Maccanti as young Olmo
- Dominique Sanda as Ada Chiostri Polan
- Francesca Bertini as Sister Desolata
- Laura Betti as Regina
- Donald Sutherland as Attila Mellanchini
- Stefania Sandrelli as Anita Foschi
- Werner Bruhns as Ottavio Berlinghieri
- Stefania Casini as Neve
- Sterling Hayden as Leo Dalcò
- Anna Henkel as Anita Dalcò, Olmo's daughter
- Ellen Schwiers as Amelia
- Alida Valli as Signora Pioppi
- Burt Lancaster as Alfredo the Elder
- Romolo Valli as Giovanni Berlinghieri
- Giacomo Rizzo as Rigoletto
- Pippo Campanini as Don Tarcisio
- Antonio Piovanelli as Turo Dalcò
- Paulo Branco as Orso Dalcò
- Liù Bosisio as Nella Dalcò
- Maria Monti as Rosina Dalcò
- Anna Maria Gherardi as Eleonora
- Demesio Lusardi as Montanaro
- Pietro Longari Ponzoni as Pioppi
- José Quaglio as Aranzini
- Clara Colosimo as Giovanna
- Vittorio Fanfoni as Fanfoni
- Edda Ferronao as Stella's Daughter

=== Dub voices (Italian version) ===
- Ferruccio Amendola as Alfredo Berlinghieri
- Giuseppe Rinaldi as Alfredo the Elder
- Renato Mori as Leo Dalcò
- Claudio Volonté as Olmo Dalcò
- Antonio Guidi as Attila Mellanchini
- Rita Savagnone as Ada Chiostri Polan
- Riccardo Cucciolla as Ottavio Berlinghieri
- Paila Pavese as Amelia
- Rossella Izzo as Anita Dalcò, Olmo's daughter

== Production ==
The producer Alberto Grimaldi claimed that Bertolucci extended the shooting schedule to almost a year which resulted in the cost of the film increasing from $3 million to $8 million.

== Release ==
The original director's cut of the film runs 317 minutes (5 hours, 17 minutes) and was released in two parts in Italy. Grimaldi was contractually obligated to deliver a 195-minute (3 hour, 15 minute) version to Paramount Pictures for release in the United States and Canada. Bertolucci originally wanted to release the film in two parts, but, on Grimaldi's refusal, 20th Century Fox picked up distribution in the United States, dropping out when Bertolucci declined to shorten the film by 80 minutes.

Grimaldi locked out Bertolucci from the editing room and assembled a 180-minute cut. Bertolucci, unsatisfied with Grimaldi's cut, decided to compromise. His 247-minute (4 hour, 7 minute) version was initially released in the United States. In 1987, the Bravo channel broadcast the uncut version with English-dubbed dialogue. In 1991, the film was restored to its original length and shown in a limited release. The film has been shown uncut on Sky Movies and Film4.

When Bertolucci released his 317-minute version to theaters, the Motion Picture Association of America classified the film with an X rating. The 245-minute American cut, which was also officially available on home-video in the United States, retained its R rating. In 2006, Paramount surrendered the NC-17 rating of the uncut version, then released it as unrated on DVD on 5 December 2006. This same uncut version was released on Blu-ray in the US by Olive Films on 15 May 2012.

== Reception ==
1900 won the 1977 Bodil Award for Best Non-American Film and received second place in the National Society of Film Critics Award for Best Cinematography.

Paramount theatrically released the shorter version in the United States on October 7, 1977, and it has received mixed reviews from Western critics. On Rotten Tomatoes, the film holds an approval rating of 57% based on 21 reviews, with an average rating of 7/10. Metacritic, which uses a weighted average, assigned the film a score of 70 out of 100, based on 14 critics, indicating "generally favorable" reviews.

In the Chicago Sun-Times, film critic Roger Ebert wrote that the film "doesn't seem to go anywhere. It's an epic only by virtue of its length."

== Soundtrack ==
Professional ratings
Review scores
Source	Rating
AllMusic	4.5/5 stars

The music for the movie was composed by Ennio Morricone, who included several melodies from Giuseppe Verdi operas.

1. "Romanzo" – 4:05
2. "Estate – 1908" – 5:01
3. "Autunno – 1922" – 4:43
4. "Regalo di nozze" – 2:45
5. "Testamento" – 2:25
6. "Polenta" – 1:07
7. "Il primo sciopero" – 2:48
8. "Padre e figlia" – 1:27
9. "Tema di Ada" – 4:50
10. "Apertura della caccia" – 5:44
11. "Verdi è morto" – 2:30
12. "I nuovi crociati" – 3:32
13. "Il quarto stato" – 1:33
14. "Inverno – 1935" – 2:45
15. "Primavera – 1945" – 2:06
16. "Olmo e Alfredo" – 2:18

== See also ==
- "La Lega"
- List of longest films

== Notes ==
1.Paramount Pictures distributed the edited version of the film in the United States theatrically; 20th Century-Fox handled Italian distribution of the film and United Artists handled distribution in select territories including France, West Germany, Scandinavia and Australia while independent distributors released the film in other territories; Fox obtained rights to the film in the territories controlled by independent distributors at the time of the film's release on VHS.
