= Lega (surname) =

Lega is a surname of Italian origin. It is derived from the Italian word for 'league' or 'alliance,' most likely used beginning in the Middle Ages to describe a member of a group. Other spellings include Legha and Leghe.

Notable people with the surname include:

- Achille Lega (1899–1934), Italian painter
- David Lega (born 1973), Swedish politician and paralympic swimmer
- Giulio Lega (1892–1973), Italian World War I flying ace
- Joceline Lega, French applied mathematician
- Mario Lega (born 1949), Italian motorcyclist
- Mario Lega (athlete) (born 1957), Italian long jumoer
- Michele Lega (1860–1935), cardinal
- Silvestro Lega (1826–1895), Italian painter
- Silvio Lega (1945–2021), Italian politician

== See also ==
- Lega (disambiguation)
