= The Spider's Stratagem =

- U.S. home video cover
- Genre: Political drama Mystery
- Based on: Theme of the Traitor and the Hero by Jorge Luis Borges
- Written by: Bernardo Bertolucci; Marilù Parolini; Edoardo De Gregorio
- Directed by: Bernardo Bertolucci
- Starring: Giulio Brogi; Alida Valli
- Country of origin: Italy
- Original language: Italian

Production
- Producer: Giovanni Bertolucci
- Cinematography: Vittorio Storaro; Franco Di Giacomo
- Editor: Roberto Perpignani
- Running time: 100 minutes
- Production companies: RAI; Red Film

Original release
- Network: Rai 1
- Release: 25 October 1970

The Spider's Stratagem (Italian: Strategia del ragno) is a 1970 Italian made-for-television political mystery-drama film written and directed by Bernardo Bertolucci and produced by RAI. The screenplay is based on the 1944 short story Theme of the Traitor and the Hero by Jorge Luis Borges. The film stars Giulio Brogi and Alida Valli, and follows the son of an antifascist martyr who travels to his namesake’s father’s hometown, uncovering secrets of his father’s past in the process.

The film was screened at the 31st Venice International Film Festival before premiering on Rai 1 on 25 October 1970, then rebroadcasting on Rai 2 five days later. It received a limited theatrical release in Europe and the United States.

== Plot ==
At the request of his father's mistress, Draifa, Athos Magnani arrives by train in the town of Tara, where his father, also named Athos Magnani, was killed before his birth. The father, remembered as a resistance hero and whom his son greatly resembles, was killed by unknown fascists in 1936—or so says Draifa, the statue in the square, and everyone in the town. Draifa contacted Athos after seeing his picture in a newspaper and expects him to solve or avenge his father's murder. He hears that a few days before his father's death, a fortune teller had predicted his death, as in Macbeth, and on his corpse was an unopened letter warning him not to go ahead, as in Julius Caesar.

His enquiries about his father's death are met with evasion or hostility. Eventually three acquaintances of his father tell him that he planned to blow up Benito Mussolini in the local theatre, during a performance of Rigoletto. The plot failed and his father died after being betrayed to the police. Athos does not believe this tale.

Unsure whether to stay in this claustrophobic town where the truth is never told, he hears the sound of Rigoletto coming from the theatre. Entering, he is told that his father failed to carry out the bombing out of fear, and himself tipped off the police. For this, his fellow conspirators killed him, with his agreement, and ascribed the death to unknown fascists.

At a ceremony in front of his father's statue, Athos starts to tell this story but stops. Whether it was through betrayal or cowardice that his father had become a hero, the town, in his view, needs its myth. Resolving to leave, at the railway station he hears announcements that trains are increasingly late and, looking at the tracks, sees they are rusted and overgrown. He, too, is caught in the web.

== Cast ==
- Giulio Brogi as Athos Magnani, father and son
- Alida Valli as Draifa
- Tino Scotti as Costa
- Pippo Campanini as Garibazzi
- Franco Giovannelli as Rasori
- Allen Midgette as Sailor
- Giuseppe Bertolucci as Lion bearer

== Production ==
The film was shot in the summer of 1969. Locations included Sabbioneta for most scenes in Tara. The theater's exterior is Sabbioneta's Palazzo Ducale, and its interior is Fidenza's Teatro Magnani. The square of the hotel is in Pomponesco, with a levee in the background. Draifa's villa is the Villa Longari Ponzoni in Rivarolo del Re ed Uniti. The train station is that of Brescello.

== Distribution ==
The film premiered on August 25, 1970, at the 31st Venice International Film Festival. It was broadcast in prime time on the national television channel Programma Nazionale on October 25, 1970, and then repeated on Secondo Programma on October 30 of the same year.

== Themes and reception ==
Upon its initial release, the film was harshly criticized by critic Goffredo Fofi, but defended by other critics such as Gian Luigi Rondi and Tullio Kezich. In France, reviews were more positive, receiving good reviews from publications such as Le Monde.

Film historian/scholar Robert P. Kolker wrote about The Spider's Stratagem in his 1985 book Bernardo Bertolucci. Writing about Bertolucci's portrayal of the hero and his son, and the son's attempt to find out the "truth" of his martyred father's past, Kolker said, "The truth, he discovers, is a complex web of illusions and deception, of lies, fear, and paralysis, of perceptions gone awry, and of time brought to a stop." Kolker observed the film was "about the political effects of spectacle, in the fascist penchant for rhetorical action...By alluding to the operatic spectacle without actually showing it, Bertolucci permits the viewer to comprehend participating in the spectacle." Kolker said the film was Bertolucci's "most modernist," a modernism based on identification rather than distance.

American film critic Jay Cocks, in a contemporary review for Time Magazine, wrote, “The Spider’s Stratagem boasts no superstars in the cast, no odor of brimstone and no heavy hype. It should not need them. Less exotic than The Conformist or Tango, certainly more subtle and contained, The Spider’s Stratagem is Bertolucci’s best movie.”

Roger Ebert writing for Chicago Sun-Times said the film had "a beautiful cinematic grace, a way of establishing atmosphere and furthering plot without a lot of talking," and that it wasn't a mass-audience movie. He added that the film would "have most appeal to people sensitive to Bertolucci's audacious use of camera movements and colors."

Pauline Kael, critic for The New Yorker, wrote that "it didn't have enough content to justify the atmosphere of mystification."

On the review aggregator website Rotten Tomatoes, 100% of 13 critics' reviews are positive, with an average rating of 8.6/10.
