= 3. Liga (disambiguation) =

3. Liga is the third tier of the German football league system.

3. Liga, 3. liga or 3 liga may also refer to:

- 3. Liga (Slovakia), third-highest football league in Slovakia
- 3. Liga (Switzerland), football league in Switzerland
- 3. Liga Süd-West, third-highest level of Rugby union league system in Germany
- III liga, fourth-highest football league in Poland

== See also ==
- III Lyga, football league in Lithuania
- III liiga, football league in Estonia
- Liga (disambiguation)
- 1. Liga (disambiguation)
- 2. Liga (disambiguation)
- 4. Liga (disambiguation)
- Liga 3 (disambiguation)
- Liga III, the third level of the Romanian football league system
