= Synagogue of Sabbioneta =

Synagogue in Sabbioneta

- Sinagoga di Sabbioneta
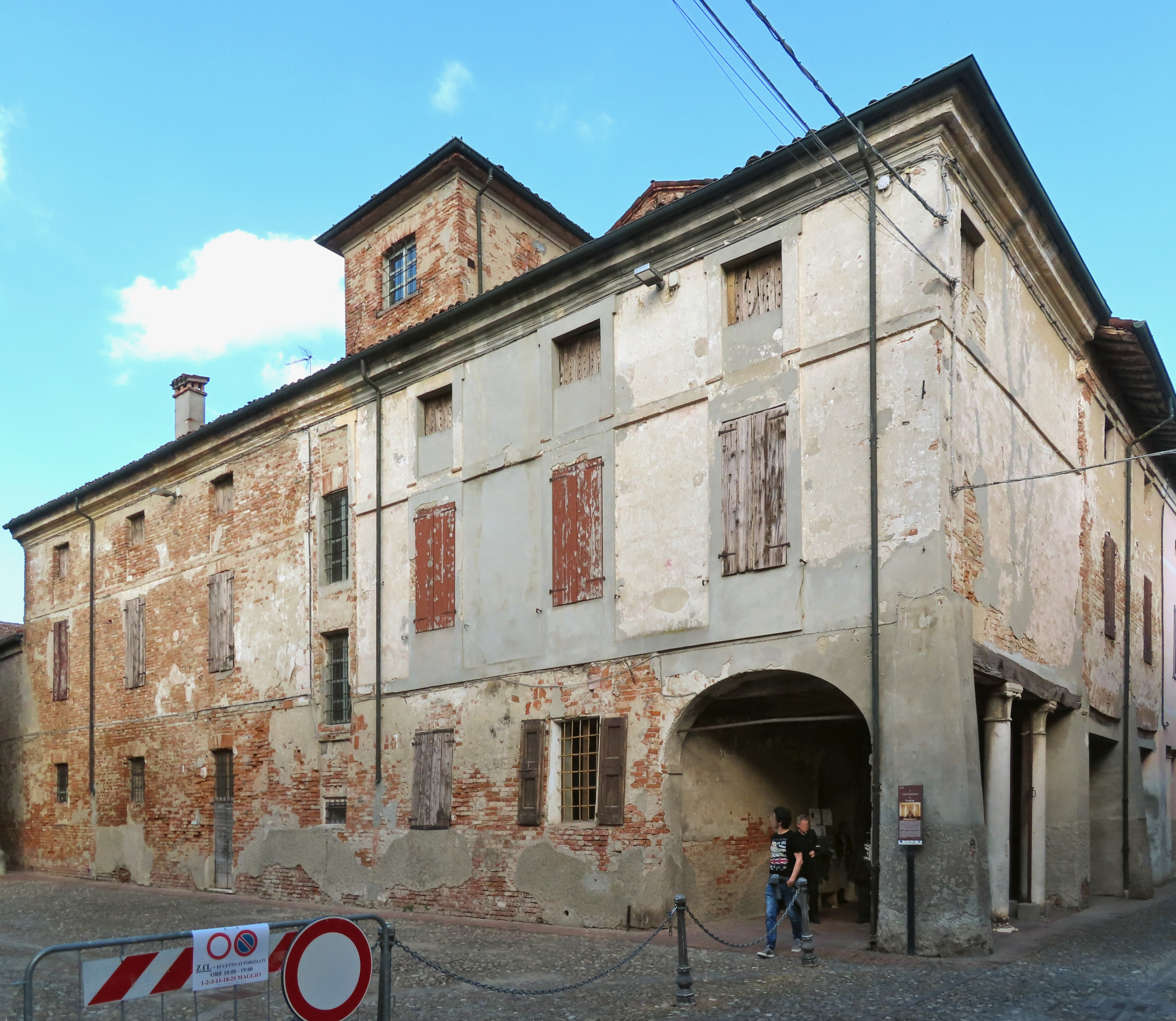
- Exterior view from the Northwest corner

Religion
- Affiliation: Judaism
- Ecclesiastical or organizational status: Inactive
- Year consecrated: 1821

Location
- Location: Via Bernardino Campi 1, Sabbioneta, Italy
- Interactive map of Synagogue of Sabbioneta
- Coordinates: 44°59′57″N 10°29′28″E

Architecture
- Architect: Carlo Visioli
- Style: Neoclassical
- Completed: 1824

The Synagogue of Sabbioneta (Italian: Sinagoga di Sabbioneta) is a Jewish synagogue located in Sabbioneta, Italy. It is no longer active and serves as a museum.

== History ==
A project to build the synagogue began in 1821 by the town's Jewish community to mark autonomy from the one in Mantua. Sabbioneta did not have a Jewish ghetto, and therefore had no set obligtion to build in a certain area of the city. It was decided to build within the wing of a 16th-century building rented out by its owner, Salomone Forti, at the location of a former oratory. The project was headed by Carlo Visoli, architect of the Synagogue of Viadana. Construction was completed in 1824.

In the 20th century, the synagogue experienced a long period of abandonment. The hall became dilapidated and the interior became unsafe. Some of the original furnishings were transferred to Modena, and others to Israel. The ark from the 16-century, which was located in the congregation's previous synagogue, has been in the Strauss House near the Western Wall since 1970.

In 1994, recognizing the need for repairs, the building began a period of restoration by the superintendent of Cultural and Architectural Heritage of Brescia, funded by grassroots organizations in Sabbioneta. The synagogue has been restored to its original condition and has become, in part, a museum for visitors. It is co-managed by the Jewish community of Mantua and an organization in Sabbioneta. It was further damaged in the 2012 Northern Italy earthquakes, and was subsequently repaired. It currently is a museum.

== Description ==
The synagogue entrance is located on the ground floor under a portico with marble columns. An atrium leads to a marble staircase to the second floor, which contains the shul. Taking a ramp further past the staircase leads to the floor hosting the women's section.

The interior, built in the Neoclassical style, is rectangular and reaches two stories. It is paved with stucco on its coffered vault, added in 1840 by Swiss artist Pietro Bolla. The walls are paved with similar stucco, in addition to faux marble adornments. The Torah ark is located between two Corinthian capped columns, surmounted by a tympanum with a gilded Hebrew inscription. It is encircled by a wrought iron gate.

Opposite to the ark, an identical set of columns holds up the women's section, enclosed by a wooden gate. The shul contains original benches from the 19th-century.

== Gallery ==
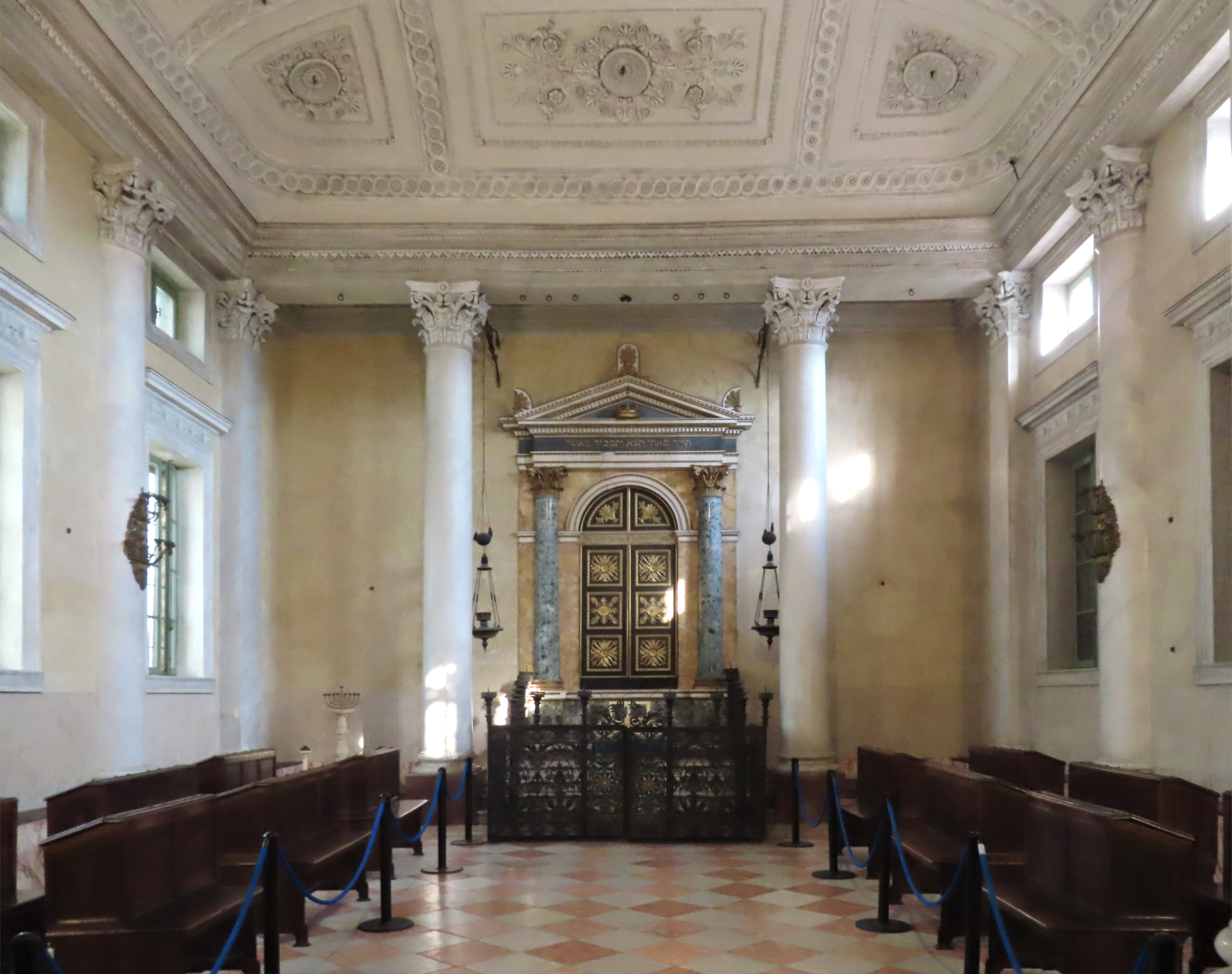
Interior of the synagogue, facing the Torah ark

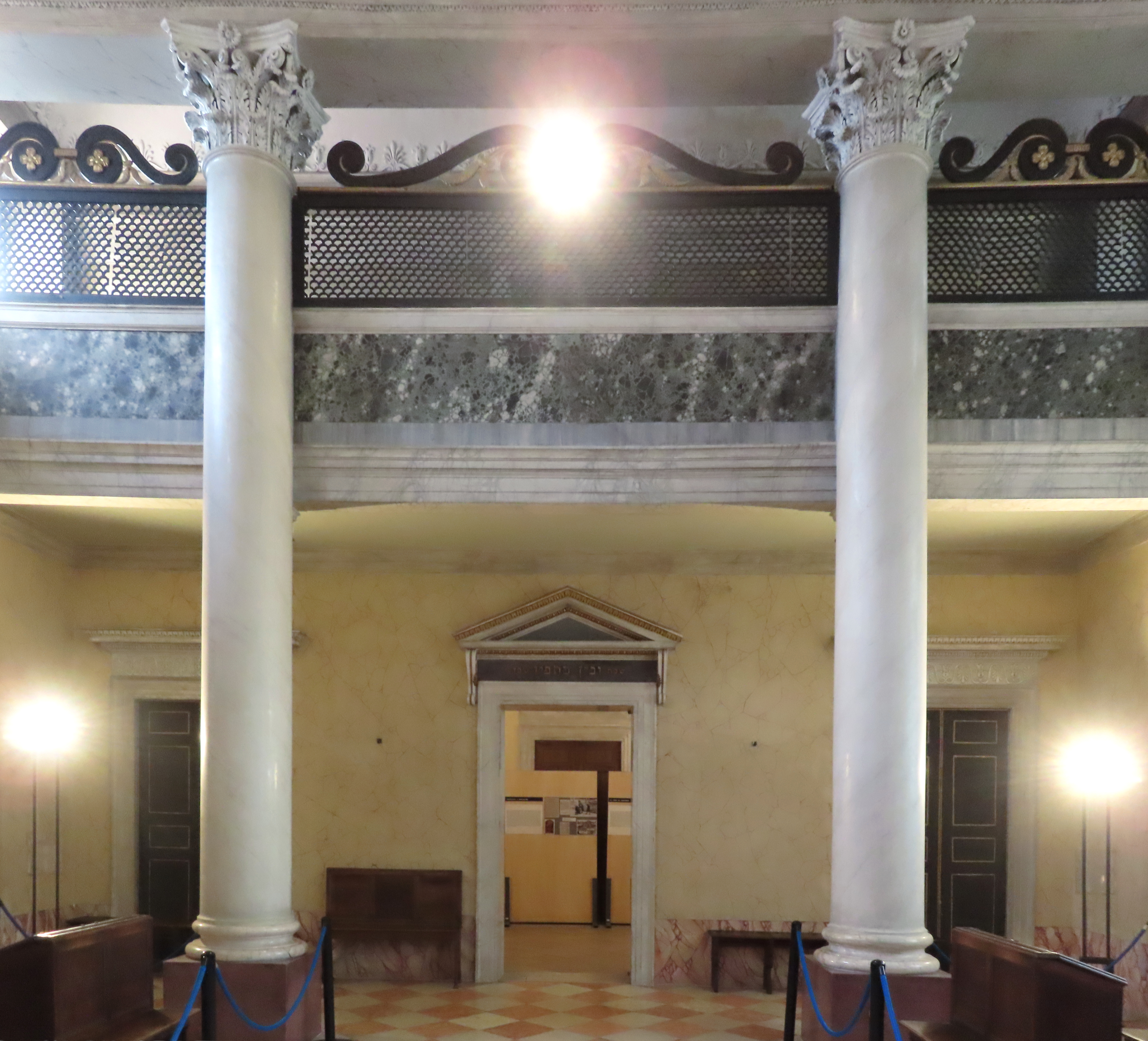
Pillars holding up the women's gallery

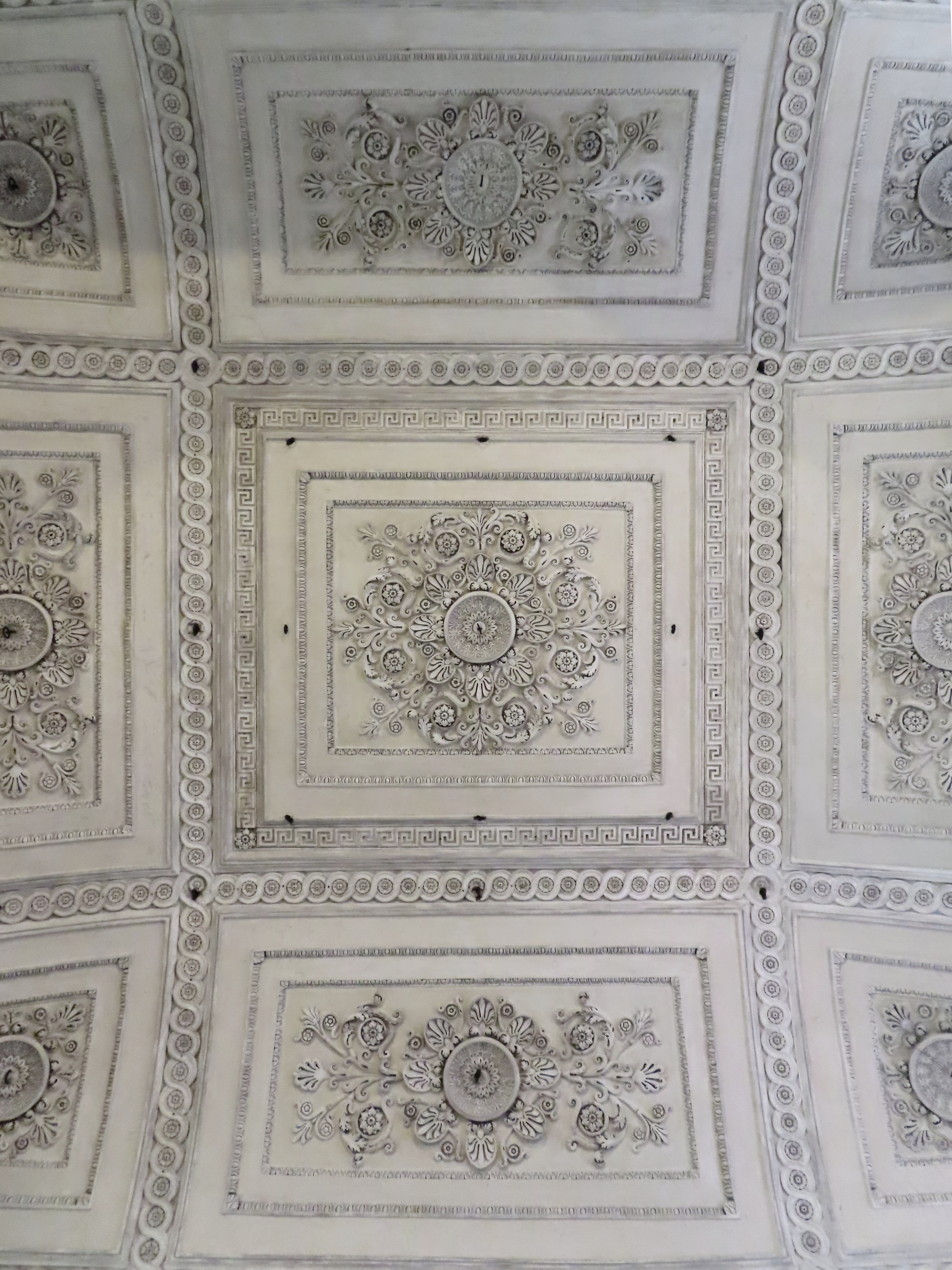
Neoclassical ornamentation on the ceiling

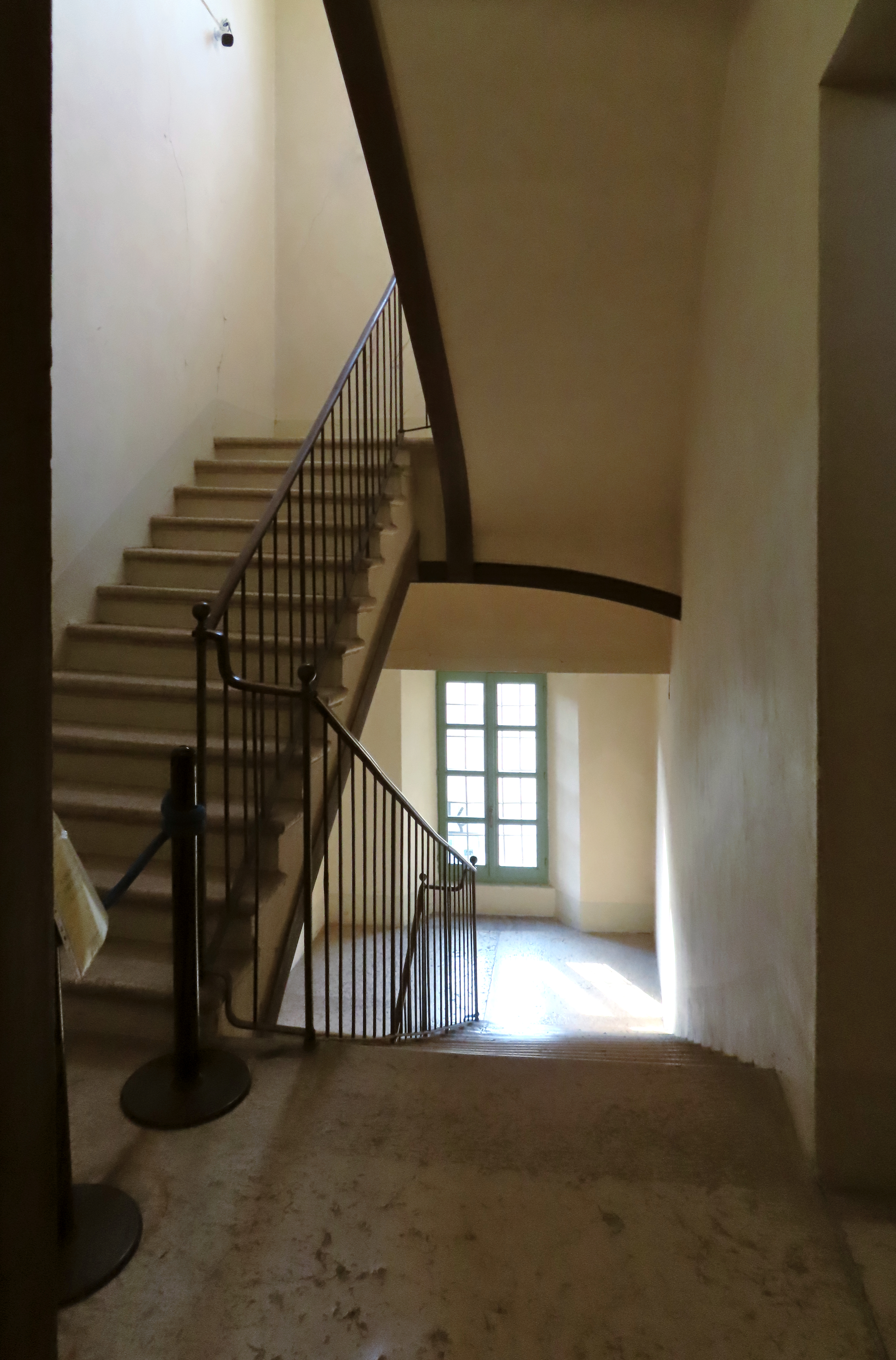
Staircase leading to the second floor

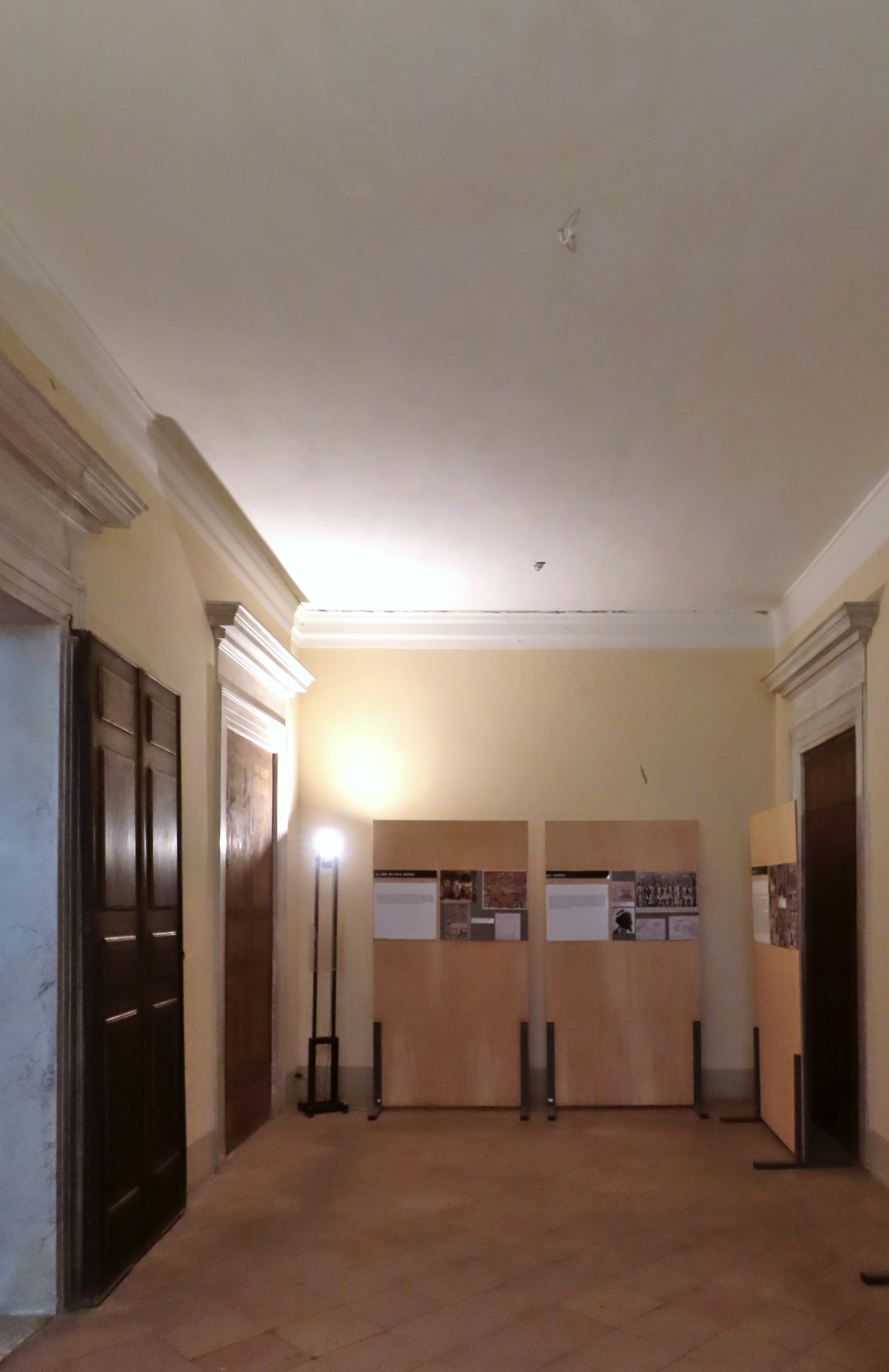
Historical information exhibition located in the vestibule

== See also ==
- List of synagogues in Italy
