= Līga =

Female given name

- Gender: Female

Origin
- Origin: Latvian
- Region of origin: Baltic region

Līga is a Latvian given name. Its nameday is on June 23, which is the Latvian festival day of Līgo.

== Persons ==
- Līga Dekmeijere (born 1983), Latvian tennis player
- Līga Glāzere (born 1986), Latvian biathlete
- Līga Kļaviņa (born 1980), Latvian female heptathlete
- Līga Liepiņa (born 1946), Latvian actress
- Līga Purmale (born 1948), Latvian painter
- Līga Velvere (born 1990), Latvian athlete track and field athlete

== See also ==
- Liga (disambiguation)
