= Liga 3 =

Liga 3 may refer to several different football leagues:

- Liga 3 (Georgia)
- Liga Nusantara, Indonesia
- Liga 3 (Peru)
- Liga 3 (Portugal)
- Liga III, Romania
- Thai League 3
- Ligue 3

== See also ==
- 3. Liga (disambiguation)
- Liga (disambiguation)
