= Beata Vergine Incoronata, Sabbioneta =

Church building in Sabbioneta, Italy

Coordinates: 45.0000°N 10.4890°E

Beata Vergine Incoronata, or church of the Incoronata, is a renaissance-style, Roman Catholic church located in the town center of Sabbioneta, province of Mantua, region of Lombardy, Italy.

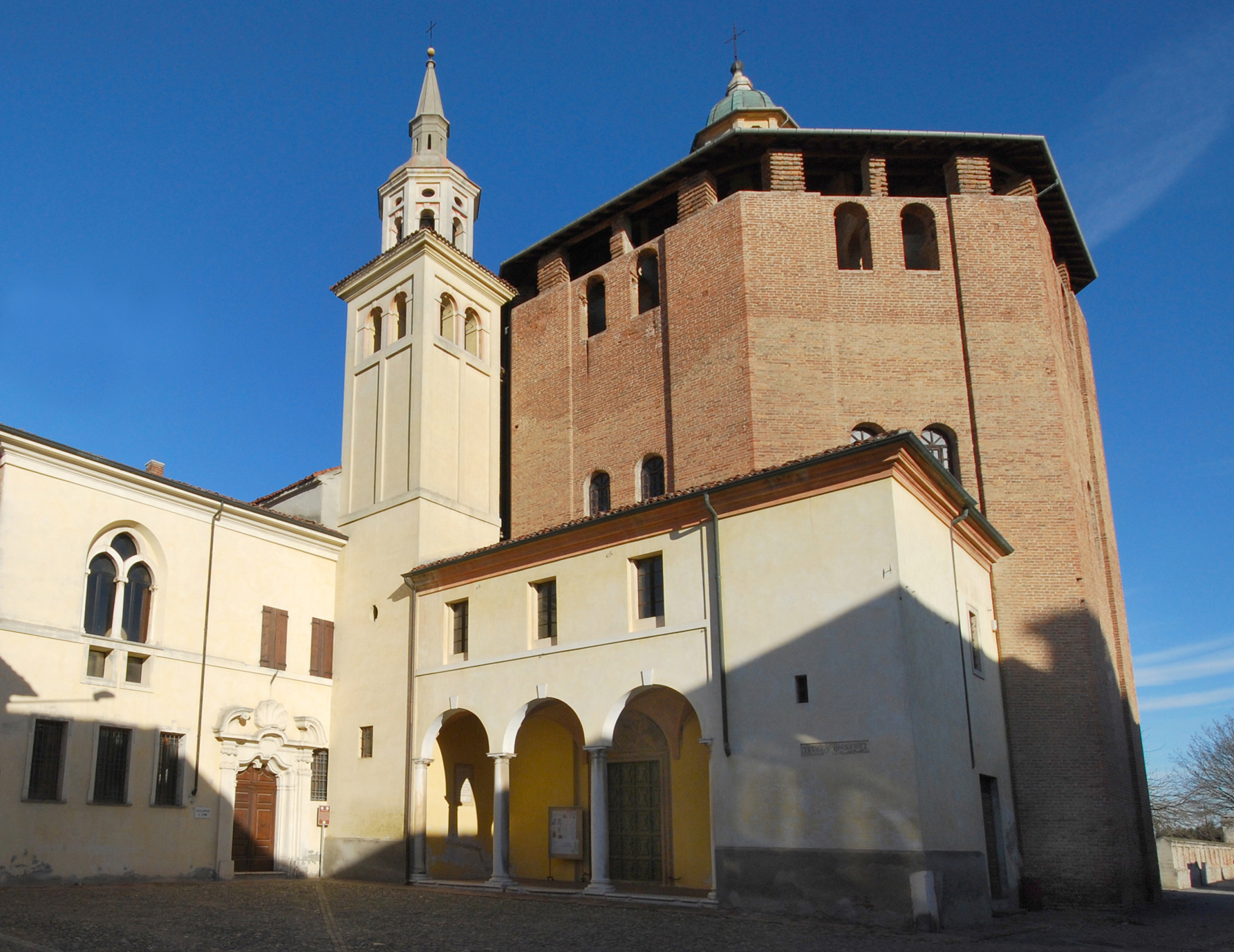
Church entrance and dome.

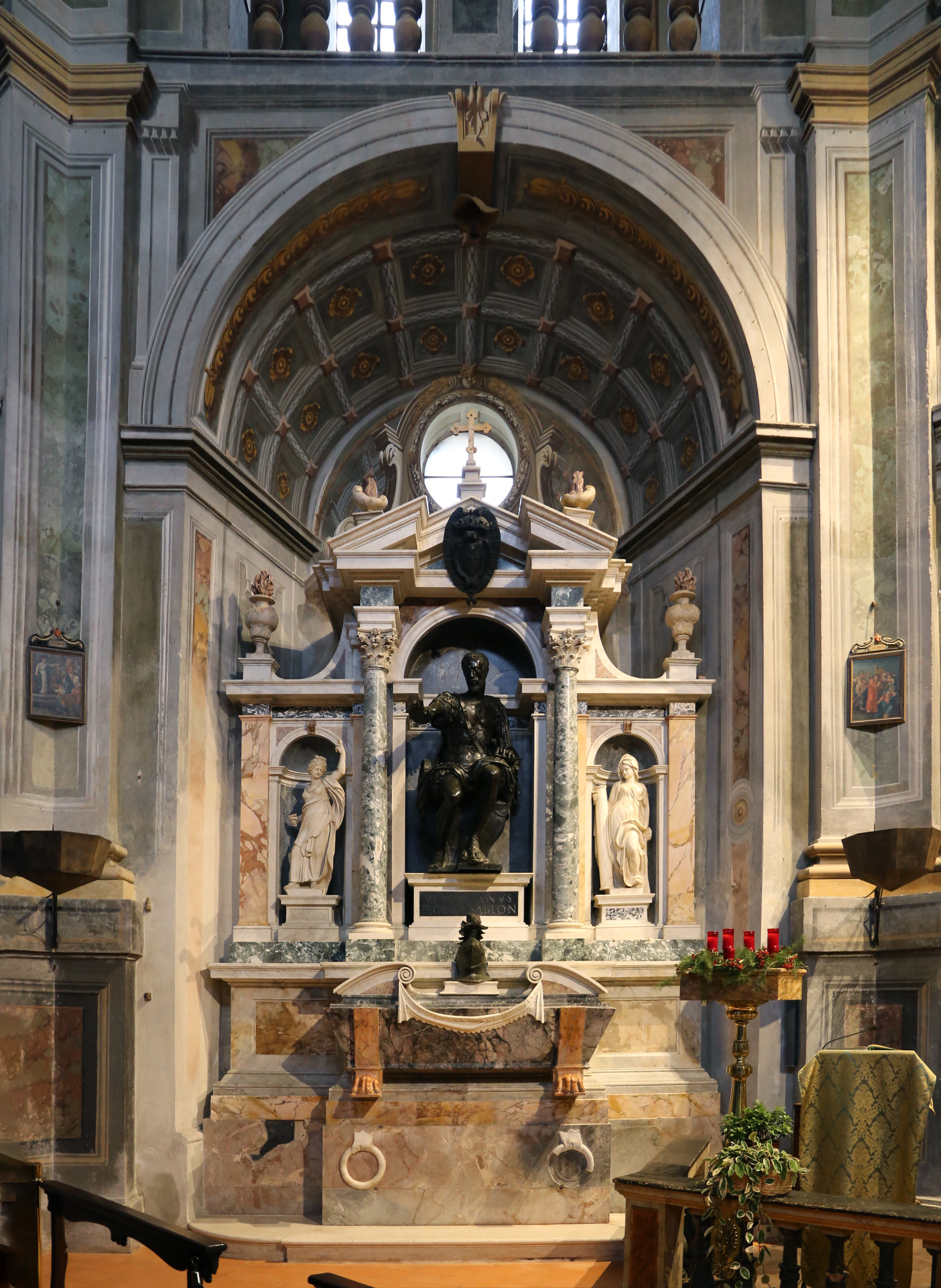
Tomb of Vespasiano Gonzaga

== History ==
The church was erected in 1586-1588 at the site were a prior church dedicated to San Niccolò was located. It was commissioned by Vespasiano Gonzaga. The church has an octagonal layout, similar to the Bramantesque church of Santa Maria Incoronata in Lodi.

The church has eight surrounding chapels, one with Vespasiano's funereal monument, were decorated mainly in the 18th century. The frescoes in the church were painted with quadratura in 1768 by a team led by Antonio Galli Bibiena.

The main altar has a statue of the Vergine Addolorata (Virgin in Grief) by Angelo Piò. Among the altarpieces in the chapels is a Flight to Egypt by an unknown Parmesan painter of the second half of the 17th century. The second chapel has a painting depicting the Crowned Virgin with Saints Pellegrino Laziosi and Giuliana Falconieri, and the blessed Gioacchino Piccolomini by a follower of Giovanni Morini. The wooden confessionals were carved by Antonio Maria Lodi.

The funereal monument to Vespasiano, in polychrome marble, was built in 1592 by Giovanni Battista della Porta (architect). The bronze sitting statue of Vespasiano was created circa 1560 by Leone Leoni. During recent restorations, the skeletal remains of Vespasiano were found with his badge of the Order_of_the_Golden_Fleece, granted to him in 1585 by the King Philip II of Spain, and awarded by Ottavio Farnese in Parma. The jewel is now conserved in the Sala del Tesoro of the Museum of Sacred Art in Sabbioneta.
