= 4. Liga =

4. Liga or 4 liga may refer to:

- 4. Liga (Slovakia), fourth-highest football league in Slovakia
- 4. Liga (Switzerland), regional football league in Switzerland
- IV liga, fifth-highest football league in Poland

== See also ==
- IV liiga, football league in Estonia
- Liga IV, football league in Romania
- Liga (disambiguation)
- 1. Liga (disambiguation)
- 2. Liga (disambiguation)
- 3. Liga (disambiguation)
