= Giovanni Josse =

Italian composer and conductor

Giovanni Maria Josse (Tolosa, 13 February 1815 - 12 June 1884) was an Italian composer and conductor. Better known by his French name Jean-Marie Josse while active in Paris during the 1840s and 1850s, at the end of his life he returned to Italy to stage his first opera.

== Works ==
- L'ermite, ou la tentation, oratorio fantastique en quatre parties Paris, 25 August 1848.
- Le talisman, Théâtre de l'Opéra-Comique-Favart Paris 12 July 1850
- La lega, opera after Henri III et sa cour by Alexandre Dumas. La Scala, Milan 25 January 1876
