= Druga Liga =

Druga Liga means Second League in Bosnian, Croatian, Montenegrin, Polish, Serbian and Slovenian, may refer to:

- Druga Liga Federacija Bosne i Hercegovine, (Second League of Federation of Bosnia and Herzegovina), third football division of Bosnia and Herzegovina
- Druga Hrvatska Nogometna Liga, Croatian football second division
- Druga Crnogorska Liga, Montenegrin football second division
- Polish Second League, Polish football second division, called in Polish Druga Liga
- Druga Liga Republike Srpske, (Second League of Republika Srpska), third football division of Bosnia and Herzegovina
- Druga Slovenska Nogometna liga, Slovenian football second division
- Yugoslav Second League, defunct Yugoslav football second division

== See also ==
- Prva Liga (disambiguation)
- Ukrainian Second League (Ukrainian: Druha Liha)
- 2. Liga (disambiguation)
