= Vysshaya Liga =

Vysshaya Liga (Russian and Belarusian) or Ukrainian: Vyshcha Liha (Major League) may refer to:

Football

- Soviet Top League
  - Russian Top League (1992–2000)
  - Ukrainian Premier League (1992–2008)
  - Belarusian Premier League (1992–present)
  - Azerbaijan Premier League
  - Tajikistan Higher League

Ice hockey

- Supreme Hockey League
- Ukrainian Hockey Championship
- Vysshaya Liga (Belarus)
- Vysshaya Liga (1992–2010)
