= La Lega (song) =

Song
- English title: The Union
- Written: late 19th century
- Songwriter(s): Unknown

"La Lega" is an Italian folk song from the Emilian people, sung by the rice-growers of the Po Valley. It is the symbol of the revolt of the agricultural workers against their bosses at the end of the 19th century, when the unions were starting to be created.

It may be heard in Bernardo Bertolucci's film 1900 when the farmers, under Anna's leadership, start to demonstrate against the expulsion of the farmers because their wealthy landowners do not respect their contracts.

== Lyrics ==
Italian Lyrics La Lega Sebben che siamo donne Paura non abbiamo Per amor dei nostri figli Per amor dei nostri figli Sebben che siamo donne Paura non abbiamo Per amor dei nostri figli Socialismo noi vogliamo* Refrain : O li o li o la E la lega la crescerà E noialtri socialisti E noialtri socialisti O li o li o la E la lega la crescerà E noi altri lavoratori Vogliamo la libertà E la libertà non viene Perchè non c'è l'unione Crumiri col padrone Crumiri col padrone E la libertà non viene Perchè non c'è l'unione Crumiri col padrone Son tutti da ammazzar Refrain Sebben che siamo donne Paura non abbiamo Abbiamo delle belle buone lingue Abbiamo delle belle buone lingue Sebben che siamo donne Paura non abbiamo Abbiam delle belle buone lingue E ben ci difendiamo Refrain E voialtri signoroni Che ci avete tanto orgoglio Abbassate la superbia Abbassate la superbia E voialtri signoroni Che ci avete tanto orgoglio Abbassate la superbia E aprite il portafoglio O li o li o la E la lega la crescerà E noialtri lavoratori E noialtri lavoratori O li o li o la E la lega la crescerà E noialtri lavoratori I vuruma vess pagà O li o li o la E la lega la crescerà E noialtri socialisti E noialtri socialisti O li o li o la E la lega la crescerà E noialtri socialisti Vogliamo la libertà	English Translation The Union Although we are women Fear we do not have For the love of our children For the love of our children Although we are women Fear we do not have For the love of our children Socialism we want Refrain : O li o li o la And the Union will grow And we socialists And we socialists O li o li o la And the Union will grow And we workers We want liberty! But freedom does not come Because we're not united The scabs with the boss The scabs with the boss But freedom does not come Because we're not united The scabs with the boss They should all be killed Refrain Although we are women Fear we do not have We have good tongues We have good tongues Although we are women Fear we do not have We have good tongues And we defend well Refrain And you fine gentlemen Who have such pride Close your pride Close your pride And you fine gentlemen That have such pride Close your pride And open your wallet O li o li o la And the Union will grow And we workers And we workers O li o li o la And the Union will grow And we workers We want our pay! O li o li o la And the Union will grow And we socialists And we socialists O li o li o la And the Union will grow And we socialists We want freedom!

(*)An alternative line to 'Per amor de nostri figli Socialismo noi vogliamo' which is widely used is: 'Per amor de nostri figli In lega ci mettiamo'

== English Version ==
An English singing version is:

1. You say we’re only women, But we are not afraid,

For the sake of our children, For the sake of our children

You say we’re only women, But we are not afraid,

For the sake of our children, Our union will be made Hey!

(Refrain) Oli, oli olla, And the union it will grow

And we the socialistis, And we the socialistis,

Oli, oli olla, And the union it will grow

And we the socialistis, want liberty right now

2. But liberty will not come, Because we’re not united

The blacklegs with the bosses, The blacklegs with the bosses,

But liberty will not come, Because we’re not united

The blacklegs with the bosses, They must be defeated.

3. You say we’re only women, But we are not afraid

We have our defences. We have our defences.

You say we’re only women, But we are not afraid

We have our defences. Our tongues are sharp as blades, Hey

4. You men rich and boastful, The pride of all the nation,

Forget your self-importance, forget your self-importance

You men rich and boastful, The pride of all the nation,

Forget your self-importance, And make a big donation
