= 2. Liga =

2. Liga, 2. liga, 2 liga, II Liga or Druhá liga may refer to:

- Football:
  - 2. Liga (Slovakia), second-highest football division in Slovakia
  - 2. Liga (Switzerland), the sixth tier of the Swiss football league system
  - 2. Liga Interregional, the fifth tier of the Swiss football league system
  - 2. Liga (Austria), the second tier of the Austrian football league system
  - Czech 2. liga, second-highest football division
  - 2. līga, football league in Latvia
  - II liga, the third tier of the Polish football league system
  - 2. Bundesliga, second-highest football division in Germany
  - Russian Second League, third-highest football division in Russia
- Ice hockey:
  - Swiss 2. Liga (ice hockey)
  - 2nd Czech Republic Hockey League (Czech: 2. hokejová liga České republiky)
  - Czechoslovak 2. liga, former ice hockey league in Czechoslovakia
  - Slovak 2. Liga, ice hockey league in Slovakia
- Rugby union:
  - II liga Rugby, third-highest rugby union league in Poland
- Speedway
  - Polish Speedway Second League, third-highest motorcycle speedway league in Poland

== See also ==
- II Lyga, football league in Lithuania
- II liiga, football league in Estonia
- Druga Liga (disambiguation)
- Ukrainian Second League (Ukrainian: Druha Liha)
- Liga (disambiguation)
- 1. Liga (disambiguation)
- 3. Liga (disambiguation)
- 4. Liga (disambiguation)
- Liga 2 (disambiguation)
- Liga II, the second-tier league of the Romanian football league system
