= La fiaccola sotto il moggio =

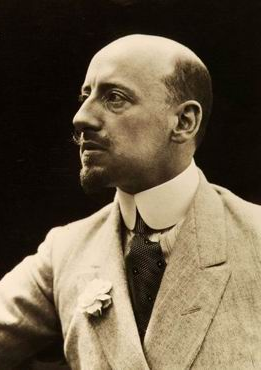

La fiaccola sotto il moggio ("The torch under the bushel") is a 1905 play by the Italian writer Gabriele D'Annunzio. It was adapted for film twice in the silent era.

== Film adaptations ==
- Blood Vengeance (La fiaccola sotto il moggio) (1911), directed by Luigi Maggi
- La fiaccola sotto il moggio (1916), directed by Eleuterio Rodolfi
