= 1. Liga =

In sports, 1. Liga, 1. liga, I Liga or Erste Liga may refer to:

== Association football ==
- 1. Bundesliga, football league in Germany
- Latvian First League, (1. līga), football league in Latvia
- I liga, the second tier of the Polish football league system
- I liga (women's football), the second tier of the women's Polish football league system
- 1. Liga Promotion, the third tier of the Swiss football league system
- 1. Liga Classic, the fourth tier of the Swiss football league system
- 1. Liga (Slovakia), former name of the second-highest football division in Slovakia
- Austrian Football First League (German: Erste Liga), the second highest division in Austrian football league system
- Czech First League, the top tier of the Czech football league system
- Primeira Liga (Portuguese: Primeira Liga), the top tier of the Portuguese football league system
- Russian First League, the second tier of the Russian football league system

== Ice hockey ==
- Czech 1. Liga, second-highest ice hockey division in the Czech Republic
- Polish 1. Liga, second-highest ice hockey division in Poland
- Slovak 1. Liga, second-highest ice hockey division in Slovakia
- Swiss 1. Liga (ice hockey), third-highest ice hockey league in Switzerland
- Erste Liga (ice hockey), an international ice hockey league

== Basketball ==
- I Liga (basketball), second level basketball league in Poland

== Rugby ==
- I liga Rugby, second-highest rugby union league in Poland

== Speedway ==
- Polish Speedway First League, second-highest motorcycle speedway league in Poland

== See also ==
- I Lyga, football league in Lithuania
- A-1 Liga, basketball league in Croatia
- Liga (disambiguation)
- 2. Liga (disambiguation)
- 3. Liga (disambiguation)
- Prva Liga (disambiguation)
- Liga 1 (disambiguation)
- Liga I, a Romanian professional league for men's association football clubs
