= List of Italian films of 1955 =

A list of films produced in Italy in 1955 (see 1955 in film):

== A-H ==
Title	Director	Cast	Genre	Notes
The Abandoned	Francesco Maselli	Lucia Bosé, Isa Miranda	Drama	About Italian resistance movement
Accadde al penitenziario	Giorgio Bianchi	Aldo Fabrizi, Alberto Sordi, Mara Berni	Comedy drama	
Accadde tra le sbarre	Giorgio Cristallini	Linda Sini, Mariemma Bardi	Drama	
Addio sogni di gloria	Giuseppe Vari	Irène Galter, Mimi Bedini	Drama	
Adriana Lecouvreur	Gabriele Ferzetti	Valentina Cortese, Gabriele Ferzetti	Biographical drama	
The Affair of the Poisons	Henri Decoin	Danielle Darrieux, Viviane Romance, Paul Meurisse	Historical drama	Co-production with France
Agguato sul mare	Pino Mercanti	Ettore Manni, Maria Frau	Drama	
Amalfi Way	Richard Wright		Documentary	
America pagana			Documentary	
Amici per la pelle (The Woman in the Painting)	Franco Rossi	Geronimo Meynier, Andrea Sciré, Luigi Tosi, Vera Carmi, Carlo Tamberlani	Childhood	
Amleto	Vittorio Gassmann, Claudio Fino	Vittorio Gassmann, Anna Maria Ferrero, Memo Benassi	TV play	
Andrea Chénier	Clemente Fracassi	Antonella Lualdi, Raf Vallone	Musical	
Are We Men or Corporals?	Camillo Mastrocinque	Totò, Paolo Stoppa, Fiorella Mari	Comedy	
The Art of Getting Along	Luigi Zampa	Alberto Sordi, Marco Guglielmi, Luisa Della Noce	Comedy	
Avanzi di galera	Vittorio Cottafavi	Richard Basehart, Eddie Constantine, Walter Chiari	Drama	
The Bachelor	Antonio Pietrangeli	Alberto Sordi, Sandra Milo	Comedy	
Beautiful but Dangerous	Robert Z. Leonard	Gina Lollobrigida, Vittorio Gassman, Robert Alda	Comedy	
Bella non piangere!	David Carbonari	Ettore Manni, Maria Fiore	Biopic	
The Belle of Rome	Luigi Comencini	Silvana Pampanini, Alberto Sordi	Comedy	
The Best Part	Yves Allégret	Gérard Philipe	Drama	
Black Dossier	André Cayatte	Jean-Marc Bory, Daniele Delorme	Drama	Coproduction with France
Bobosse	Franco Enriquez	Giorgio Albertazzi, Ave Ninchi	TV play	
Bravissimo	Luigi Filippo D'Amico	Alberto Sordi, Irene Cefaro	Comedy	
Buonanotte... avvocato!	Giorgio Bianchi	Alberto Sordi, Mara Berni	Comedy	
Buongiorno natura	Ermanno Olmi		Documentary	
Cani dietro le sbarre	Gillo Pontecorvo		Documentary	
Cantami: Buongiorno Tristezza!	Giorgio Pastina	Giacomo Rondinella, Arnoldo Foà, Milly Vitale	Comedy	
Cantate con noi	Roberto Bianchi Montero	Rosario Borelli, Isabella Abati	Comedy	
Cantiere d'inverno	Ermanno Olmi		Documentary	
Canzoni di tutta Italia	Domenico Paolella	Marco Vicario, Rossana Podestà	Musical	
Carousel of Variety	Aldo Bonaldi; Aldo Quinti	Totò, Anna Magnani	Musical	
Carovana di canzoni	Sergio Corbucci	Mario Carotenuto, Achille Togliani	Musical	
Cassa di Mezzogiorno: alcune bonifiche	Antonio Dell'Anno		Documentari	
Catene	Anton Giulio Majano	Mila Vannucci, Enrico Maria Salerno	TV play	
Cesare e Cleopatra	Franco Enriquez	Renzo Ricci, Lea Padovani	TV play	
Chéri-Bibi	Marcello Pagliero	Jean Richard, Raymond Bussieres, Lea Padovani	Adventure	Co-production with France
Come le foglie	Mario Ferrero	Giorgio Albertazzi, Laura Solari	TV play	
Courtyard	Antonio Petrucci	Georges Poujouly, Guido Martuffi	Drama	Co-production with Spain
Da qui all'eredità	Riccardo Freda	Beniamino Maggio, Alberto Sorrentino	Comedy	
Daniele tra i leoni	Anton Giulio Majano	Lea Padovani, Stefano Sibaldi	TV play	
Death of a Cyclist	Juan Antonio Bardem	Lucia Bosè, Alberto Closas	Drama	Co-production with Spain
Destination Piovarolo	Domenico Paolella	Totò, Marisa Merlini	Comedy	
Desperate Farewell	Lionello De Felice	Massimo Girotti, Lise Bourdin	Drama	
Don Camillo's Last Round	Carmine Gallone	Fernandel, Gino Cervi	Comedy	Co-production with France
Don Pasquale	Alessandro Brissoni	Italo Tajo, Alda Noni	Film-opera for TV	
Dove Dio cerca casa	Renzo Renzi		Documentary	
Eighteen Year Olds	Mario Mattoli	Marisa Allasio, Virna Lisi	Comedy	
Escape to the Dolomites	Luis Trenker	Luis Trenker, Marianne Hold, Yvonne Sanson	Drama	Co-production with West Germany
Faccia da mascalzone	Lance Comfort; Raffaele Andreassi	Valentina Cortese, Douglas Fairbanks Jr., Rossano Brazzi	Comedy	
Figaro, il barbiere di Siviglia	Camillo Mastrocinque	Cesco Baseggio, Irene Genna, Tito Gobbi	Film-opera	
Fortune carrée	Bernard Borderie	Pedro Armendáriz, Fernand Ledoux	Adventure	
Frou-Frou	Augusto Genina	Dany Robin, Louis De Funes	Comedy	
Giovanna	Gillo Pontecorvo	Non-professional actors	Drama, short film	
The Girl Friends (Le Amiche)	Michelangelo Antonioni	Eleonora Rossi Drago, Gabriele Ferzetti, Franco Fabrizi, Valentina Cortese, Yvonne Furneaux	Drama	Venice Silver Lion. 2 Nastro d'Argento
Girls of Today	Luigi Zampa	Marisa Allasio, Paolo Stoppa	Comedy	
Giuramento d'amore	Roberto Bianchi Montero	Rosario Borelli	Drama	
Goodbye Naples	Roberto Bianchi Montero	Andrea Checchi, Giorgio De Lullo	Melodrama	
The Grand Maneuver	René Clair	Michèle Morgan, Gérard Philipe	Drama	
A hero of our times	Mario Monicelli	Alberto Sordi, Franca Valeri, Giovanna Ralli,	Comedy	
Ho ritrovato mio figlio	Elio Piccon	Carlo Campanini	Drama	

== I-L ==
Title	Director	Cast	Genre	Notes
I bambini ci amano	Enzo Della Santa	Katia Loritz, Kitti Loritz, Otello Seno	Drama	
I figli dell'Etna (Vendetta di fuoco)	R. Zona	Elio Armand, Cettina Macrì	Drama	
I nostri sogni	Guglielmo Morandi	Arturo Bragaglia, Leonardo Cortese	TV play	
I pappagalli	Bruno Paolinelli	Aldo Fabrizi, Alberto Sordi	Comedy	
I pinguini ci guardano	Guido Leoni	Renato Rascel, Carlo Croccolo	Comedy	
I quattro del getto tonante	Fernando Cerchio	Marcello Marchesi, Vittorio Metz	Drama	
I tesori della Pilotta	Lino Lionello Ghiradini		Documentary	
Il bidone (The Swindlers)	Federico Fellini	Broderick Crawford, Giulietta Masina, Richard Basehart, Franco Fabrizi	Drama	Co-production with France
Il Campanile d'oro	Giorgio Simonelli	Virgilio Riento, Roberto Risso	Comedy	
Il cantante misterioso	Marino Girolami	Luciano Tajoli, Marcella Mariani	Musical	
Il conte Aquila	Guido Salvini	Rossano Brazzi, Valentina Cortese	Historical	
Il coraggio	Domenico Paolella	Totò, Gino Cervi	Comedy	
Il falco d'oro	Carlo Ludovico Bragaglia	Anna Maria Ferrero, Nadia Gray	Adventure	
Il fiume dei faraoni	Ubaldo Ragona		Documentary	
Il garofano bianco	Alessandro Brissoni	Franco Coop, Enrico Glori	TV play	
Il nostro campione	Vittorio Duse	Tiberio Mitri, Enzo Tontini	Sport	
Il padrone sono me...	Franco Brusati	Albino Cocco, Andreina Pagnani	Historical drama	
Il pensionato	Ermanno Olmi		Short film	
Il piccolo vetraio	Giorgio Capitani	Antoine Balpêtré, Lianella Carell, Luigi Tosi	Historical drama	
Il pittore di borgo	Vittorio Sala		Documentary	
Il porto della speranza	Enzo Liberti	Checco Durante	Sentimental	
Il prezzo della gloria	Antonio Musu	Gabriele Ferzetti, Dina Perbellini	War	
Il racconto della Stura	Ermanno Olmi		Documentary	
Incatenata dal destino	Enzo Di Gianni	Renato Vicario, Dante Maggio	Drama	
Ingresso centesimi 10	Ignazio Ferronetti		Anthology of silent movies	
Io piaccio	Giorgio Bianchi	Walter Chiari, Aldo Fabrizi	Comedy	
Io sono la primula rossa	Giorgio Simonelli	Sergio Fantoni, Renato Rascel	Comic	
Italia K2	Marcello Baldi		Documentary	
Je suis un sentimental	John Berry	Eddie Constantine, Bella Darvi	Crime	Co-production with France
Kean	Vittorio Gassmann, Luciano Lucignani	Vittorio Gassmann, Anna Maria Ferrero, Anna Proclemer	TV play	
L'alba, il giorno e la notte	Fernando Trebitsch	Giulio Falcier, Anita Tedesco	Comedy	Realized by the graduates of the CSC
L'energia elettrica nell'agricoltura	Ermanno Olmi		Documentary	
L'eroe	Ferruccio Cerio	Aroldo Tieri, Carlo Romano, Germana Paolieri	TV play	
L'impero del sole	Enrico Gras		Documentary	Co-production with France
The Little Rebels	Jean Delannoy	Dora Doll, Claire Olivier, Jane Marken	Drama	Co-production with France
L'onda	Ermanno Olmi		Documentary	
L'ultimo amante	Mario Mattoli	Amedeo Nazzari, May Britt	Melodrama	
La canzone del cuore	Carlo Campogalliani	Milly Vitale, Alberto Farnese	Melodrama	
La catena dell'odio	Piero Costa	Ursula Andress, Renato Baldini	Social drama	
La città del cinema	Vittorio Sala		Documentary	
La commedia del buon umore	Tatyana Pavlova	Ernesto Calindri, Isa Pola	TV play	
La gelosa	Claudio Fino	Ernesto Calindri, Mila Vannucci	TV play	
La grande savana	Elia Marcelli	Germano Longo, Edilio Kim	Adventure	
La ladra	Mario Bonnard	Lise Bourdin, Fausto Tozzi	Crime	
La mia valle	Ermanno Olmi		Documentary	
La moglie è uguale per tutti	Giorgio Simonelli	Nino Taranto, Nadia Gray, Lea Padovani	Comedy	
La porta dei sogni	Angelo D'Alessandro	Maurizio Arena, Eloisa Cianni, Maria Frau	Drama	
The Last Paradise	Folco Quilici		Documentary	
La ragazza di via Veneto	Enzo G. Castellari	Anna Maria Moneta Caglio	Comedy	
La rossa	Luigi Capuano	Fulvia Franco, Aldo Bufi Landi	Drama	
The Last Five Minutes	Giuseppe Amato	Linda Darnell, Vittorio De Sica	Comedy	Co-production with France
La vena d'oro	Mauro Bolognini	Märta Torén, Richard Basehart	Drama	
Lacrime di sposa	Sante Chimirri	Achille Togliani	Musical	
Le avventure di Giacomo Casanova	Steno	Gabriele Ferzetti, Corinne Calvet	Comedy	
Le medaglie della vecchia signora	Silverio Blasi	Emma Gramatica, Paolo Carlini	TV play	
Le ragazze di San Frediano	Valerio Zurlini	Antonio Cifariello, Rossana Podestà	Comedy	
Le signorine dello 04	Gianni Franciolini	Antonella Lualdi, Antonio Cifariello	Comedy drama	
Le zitelle di Via Hydar	Silverio Blasi	Margherita Bagni, Mario Carotenuto	TV play	
The Letters Page	Steno	Franca Valeri, Alberto Sordi	Comedy	
The Lost City	Margarita Alexandre; Rafael Maria Torrecilla	Cosetta Greco, Fausto Tozzi	Drama	Co-production with Spain
Lost continent	Enrico Gras, Giorgio Moser		Documentary	Special Jury prize at the 1955 Cannes Festival.
The lovers of Manon Lescaut	Mario Costa	Myriam Bru, Franco Interlenghi	Historical melodrama	

== M-Z ==
Title	Director	Cast	Genre	Notes
Magic Village	Jean-Paul Le Chanois	Robert Lamoureux, Lucia Bosè	Comedy	Co-production with France
Marguerite de la nuit	Claude Autant-Lara	Michèle Morgan, Yves Montand	Fantasy drama	Co-production with France
The Miller's Beautiful Wife	Mario Camerini	Vittorio De Sica, Sophia Loren, Marcello Mastroianni	Comedy	
Miracle of Marcelino	Ladislao Vajda	Rafael Rivelles, Antonio Vico	Religious	
Miseria e nobiltà	Eduardo De Filippo	Eduardo De Filippo, Dolores Palumbo	TV play	
Motivo in maschera	Stefano Canzio	Memmo Carotenuto, Peppino De Filippo	Comedy	
Nagana	Herve Bromberger	Barbara Laage, Renato Baldini	Adventure	Co-production with France
Nana	Christian-Jaque	Martine Carol, Charles Boyer	Melodrama	Co-production with France
Napoleon	Sacha Guitry	Daniel Gélin, Raymond Pellegrin	Biopic	Co-production with France
New Moon	Luigi Capuano	Achille Togliani, Virna Lisi	Crime	
Non c'è amore più grande	Giorgio Bianchi	Franco Interlenghi, Antonella Lualdi	Drama	
Non scherzare con le donne	Giuseppe Bennati	Rossana Podestà, Marco Vicario	Comedy	
Nozze fassane	Carlo Battisti		Documentary	
Okiba, non vendermi!	Gianni Fontaine	Frank Senis, Bruno Cipriani	Adventure	
Olanda	Max Magnaghy		Documentary	
Operazione notte	Giuseppe Bennati	Corinne Calvet, Andrea Checchi, Irène Tunc	Crime	
Ore 10: lezione di canto	Marino Girolami	Claudio Villa, Rosy Mazzacurati	Musical comedy	
Oro, donne e maracas	Armando William Tamburella		Documentary	
Parabola d'oro	Vittorio De Seta		Documentary	
Piccole donne	Anton Giulio Majano	Lea Padovani, Emma Danieli	TV miniseries	
Porta un bacione a Firenze	Camillo Mastrocinque	Milly Vitale	Sentimental	
The Prince with the Red Mask	Leopoldo Savona	Frank Latimore, Maria Fiore, Yvonne Furneaux	Adventure	
Processo all'amore	Enzo Liberti	Franco Silva, Jane Hugo	Melodrama	
Proibito al pubblico	Corrado Pavolini	Vittorio Sanipoli, Leonardo Cortese	TV play	
Pseudolus	Antonello Falqui		TV play	
Quando il Po è dolce	Renzo Renzi		Documentary	
Ragazza di Via Veneto	Marino Girolami	Anna Maria Moneta Caglio, Carlo Giustini	Comedy	
Red and Black	Domenico Paolella	Renato Rascel, Walter Chiari		
The Red Cloak	Giuseppe Maria Scotese	Fausto Tozzi, Patricia Medina, Bruce Cabot	Adventure	
Revelation	Mario Costa	May Britt, Francisco Rabal	Melodrama	Co-production with Spain
Ricordami	Ferdinando Baldi	Leonora Ruffo, Gino Leurini	Sentimental	
Rinaldo e Armida	Alessandro Brissoni	Sarah Ferrati, Tino Carraro	TV play	
The rival	Anton Giulio Majano	Gerard Landry, Anna Maria Ferrero	Melodrama	
The River Girl (La Donna del fiume)	Mario Soldati	Rik Battaglia, Sophia Loren, Gérard Oury	Drama	
Roberto e Marianna	Enzo Ferrieri	Enrica Corti, Giancarlo Sbragia	TV play	
Roman Tales	Gianni Franciolini	Totò, Vittorio De Sica, Silvana Pampanini	Comedy	
Romanzo	Daniele D'Anza	Gianni Santuccio, Lea Padovani, Paolo Carlini	TV play	
Rommel's Treasure	Romolo Marcellini	Dawn Addams, Paul Hubschmid, Isa Miranda	Drama	
Sbandato!	Antero Morreni	Ubaldo Gramm	War	
Scandal in Sorrento	Dino Risi	Vittorio De Sica, Sophia Loren, Lea Padovani	Pink neorealism	Sequel of Bread, Love and Dreams. Entered at Berlin.
Scapricciatiello	Luigi Capuano	Gabriele Tinti, Tecla Scarano, Dante Maggio, Fulvia Franco, Elena Altieri	Melodrama	
The Sign of Venus	Dino Risi	Sophia Loren, Franca Valeri, Raf Vallone, Vittorio De Sica, Alberto Sordi	Pink neorrealism	Entered into the 1955 Cannes Film Festival
Sin la sonrisa de Dios	Julio Salvador	Conrado San Martín, Julia Caba Alba	Drama	Co-production with Spain
Società Ovesticino – Dinamo	Ermanno Olmi		Documentary	
Spring, Autumn and Love	Gilles Grangier	Fernandel, Nicole Berger	Comedy drama	Co-production with France
The Star of Rio	Kurt Neumann	Maria Frau, Johannes Heesters	Adventure	Co-production with West Germany
Sulfatera	Vittorio De Seta		Documentary	
Sulla via maestra	Italo Alfaro	Alberto Lionello, Isa Cresenzi	TV play	
Sultana Safiyé	Mario Trombetti, Fikri Rutkey	Enzo Fiermonte, Maria Frau	Historical drama	Coproduction with Turkey
Suonno d'ammore	Sergio Corbucci	Achille Togliani, Ignazio Balsamo	Opera	
Suor Maria	Luigi Capuano	Piero Giagnoni	Musical drama	
Sunset in Naples	Guido Brignone	Carlo Giuffre, Maria Fiore	Musical comedy	
Tempo di tonni	Vittorio Sala		Documentary, short film	
Tom Toms of Mayumba	Gian Gaspare Napolitano	Pedro Armendáriz, Habib Benglia	Adventure	
Torna piccina mia!	Carlo Campogalliani	Milly Vitale, Gino Sinimberghi, Mara Lane	Melodrama	
Toto and Carolina	Mario Monicelli	Totò, Anna Maria Ferrero	Comedy	
Toto in Hell	Camillo Mastrocinque	Totò, Nerio Bernardi, Ubaldo Lay	Fantasy-comedy	
Tower of Lust	Abel Gance	Pierre Brasseur, Silvana Pampanini	Historical	
Trocadero	Franco Lattanzi	Nando Cecchi, Manno De Guidi	Musical	
Tua per la vita	Sergio Grieco	Gaby Andrè, Ettore Manni	Melodrama	
The Two Friends	Carlo Borghesio	Aldo Fabrizi, Peppino De Filippo	Comedy	
Ulysses	Mario Camerini	Kirk Douglas, Silvana Mangano, Anthony Quinn	Sword and sandal	Huge success. Based on Odyssey by Homer
Un cappello di paglia di Firenze	Corrado Pavolini	Alberto Bonucci, Franco Coop	TV play	
Un giglio infranto	Giorgio Walter Chili	Helene Remy, Maurizio Arena	Historical romance	
Un palco all'opera	Siro Marcellini	Emma Baron, Isa Barzizza, Franca Bettoia	Musical	
Un po' di cielo	Giorgio Moser	Gabriele Ferzetti, Constance Smith	War romance	
Una sera di maggio	Giorgio Pàstina	Barbara Florian, Carla Calò, Carlo Tamberlani, Giacomo Furia	Melodrama	
Uomini del marmo	Gillo Pontecorvo		Documentary	
Le vacanze del Sor Clemente	Camillo Mastrocinque	Alberto Talegalli, Dolores Palumbo, Franca Tamantini	Comedy	
Vendicata!	Giuseppe Vari	Milly Vitale, Alberto Farnese	Melodrama	
The White Angel	Raffaello Matarazzo	Amedeo Nazzari, Yvonne Sanson	Melodrama	
The Widow	Lewis Milestone	Patricia Roc, Massimo Serato	Romance	
Wild Love	Mauro Bolognini	Antonella Lualdi, Franco Interlenghi	Drama	
Wunderbar	Daniele D'Anza	Enrico Viarisio, Isa Barzizza	TV operetta	
Yalis, la vergine del roncador	Francesco De Robertis; Leonardo Salmieri	Francesco De Robertis, Leonardo Salmieri	Adventure	
Ça va barder	John Berry	Eddie Constantine, May Britt	Adventure	
