= 1955 in film =

The year 1955 in film involved some significant events, most notably the death of actor James Dean.

== Top-grossing films (U.S.) ==
The top-grossing hits of 1955 in the United States.

Highest-grossing films of 1955
Rank	Title	Distributor	Domestic rentals
1	Cinerama Holiday	Cinerama Releasing	$10,000,000
2	Mister Roberts	Warner Bros.	$8,500,000
3	Battle Cry	Warner Bros.	$8,100,000
4	Oklahoma!	RKO	$7,100,000
5	Guys and Dolls	MGM	$6,801,000
6	Lady and the Tramp	Buena Vista	$6,500,000
7	Picnic	Columbia	$6,300,000
8	Not as a Stranger	United Artists	$6,200,000
9	Strategic Air Command; The Seven Year Itch; The Sea Chase	Paramount; 20th Century Fox; Warner Bros.	$6,000,000
10	I'll Cry Tomorrow	MGM	$5,873,000

== Top-grossing films by country ==
The highest-grossing 1955 films from countries outside of North America.

Country	Title	Studio	Gross
India	Shree 420	R. K. Films	$1,190,000 (Note: ₹3.9 crore (US$8.19 million) (Note: 4.7619 Indian rupees per US dollar from 1950 to 1965))
Soviet Union	Private Ivan	Gorky Film Studio	$2,520,000 (Note: 10.0925 million Rbls (40.37 million Soviet tickets sold, average ticket price of 25 kopecks), 4 SUR per USD (Note: 4 Rbls per US dollar from 1950 to 1960))

== Events ==
- January 7 – UK release of the Halas and Batchelor film animation of George Orwell's Animal Farm (completed April 1954), the first full-length British-made animated feature on general theatrical release, covertly funded by the CIA.
- February 24 – 12th Golden Globe Awards announced: On The Waterfront, Marlon Brando and Judy Garland win.
- March 18 – The film adaptation of Evan Hunter's novel Blackboard Jungle previews in New York City, featuring the single "Rock Around the Clock" by Bill Haley & His Comets, the first use of a rock and roll song in a major film. Teenagers jump from their seats to dance to it at showings.
- June 1 – Premiere of Billy Wilder's film of The Seven Year Itch featuring an iconic scene of Marilyn Monroe standing on a New York City Subway grating as her white dress is blown above her knees.
- June 16 – Lady and the Tramp, the Walt Disney company's 15th animated film, premieres in Chicago, the first animated feature filmed in the CinemaScope widescreen process. Peggy Lee co-writes and sings the songs.
- June 27 – The last Republic serial, King of the Carnival, is released.
- July 18 – Disneyland opens to the public in Anaheim, California.
- September 30 – American actor James Dean dies in an automobile collision near Cholame, California, age 24. On October 27, the film Rebel Without a Cause, in which he stars, is released.
- October 11 – Theatrical release in the United States of the Rodgers and Hammerstein musical film Oklahoma!, the first feature photographed in the Todd-AO 70 mm widescreen process.
- November 3 – The musical film Guys and Dolls, starring Marlon Brando and Frank Sinatra, is premiered in New York City.
- November 22 – The death of Shemp Howard requires use of a Fake Shemp to complete The Three Stooges films which he has commenced.
- December – United Artists quit the Motion Picture Association of America over the decision to deny The Man With the Golden Arm a Production Code seal.
- December 7 – The film Picnic starring William Holden and Kim Novak is released.

== Awards ==
Category/Organization	13th Golden Globe Awards February 23, 1956		28th Academy Awards March 21, 1956
Category/Organization	Drama	Comedy or Musical	28th Academy Awards March 21, 1956
Best Film	East of Eden	Guys and Dolls	Marty
Best Director	Joshua Logan; Picnic		Delbert Mann; Marty
Best Actor	Ernest Borgnine; Marty	Tom Ewell; The Seven Year Itch	Ernest Borgnine; Marty
Best Actress	Anna Magnani; The Rose Tattoo	Jean Simmons; Guys and Dolls	Anna Magnani; The Rose Tattoo
Best Supporting Actor	Arthur Kennedy; Trial		Jack Lemmon; Mister Roberts
Best Supporting Actress	Marisa Pavan; The Rose Tattoo		Jo Van Fleet; East of Eden
Best Foreign Language Film	Children, Mother, and the General; Dangerous Curves; Eyes of Children; Ordet; Stella		Samurai I: Musashi Miyamoto

== 1955 film releases ==
=== January–March ===
- January 1955
  - January 1
    - Young at Heart
  - January 26
    - The Violent Men
  - January 29
    - The Americano
  - January 31
    - Abbott and Costello Meet the Keystone Kops
- February 1955
  - February 2
    - Battle Cry
  - February 8
    - Cinerama Holiday
- March 1955
  - A Man Called Peter
  - March 1
    - Untamed
  - March 4
    - Hit the Deck
  - March 20
    - Blackboard Jungle
  - March 23
    - Revenge of the Creature
  - March 24
    - The Glass Slipper
  - March 25
    - Strategic Air Command

=== April–June ===
- April 1955
  - April 1
    - Magdana's Donkey (Georgia)
  - April 9
    - Escape to Burma
  - April 10
    - East of Eden
  - April 11
    - Marty
  - April 13
    - Rififi (France)
  - April 20
    - Violent Saturday
  - April 24
    - Godzilla Raids Again (Japan)
- May 1955
  - May 6
    - The Prodigal
  - May 11
    - Bride of the Monster
  - May 25
    - Davy Crockett: King of the Wild Frontier
  - May 30
    - Cult of the Cobra
- June 1955
  - June 1
    - Son of Sinbad
  - June 3
    - The Seven Year Itch
  - June 4
    - The Sea Chase
  - June 10
    - 5 Against the House
    - This Island Earth
  - June 15
    - The Beast with a Million Eyes
  - June 17
    - King Dinosaur
  - June 22
    - Lady and the Tramp
    - Land of the Pharaohs
  - June 23
    - Abbott and Costello Meet the Mummy
  - Date unknown
    - Footsteps in the Fog

=== July–September ===
- July 1955
  - July 7
    - We're No Angels
  - July 13
    - Foxfire
  - July 22
    - How to Be Very, Very Popular
    - The Night of the Hunter
  - July 30
    - Mister Roberts
    - Pete Kelly's Blues
  - Dates Unknown
    - Not as a Stranger
    - It Came From Beneath the Sea
- August 1955
  - August 3
    - To Catch a Thief
  - August 5
    - Journey to the Beginning of Time
    - The King's Thief
  - August 14
    - Half Human (Japan)
  - August 17
    - To Hell and Back
  - August 25
    - You're Never Too Young
  - August 26
    - The Quatermass Xperiment
- September 1955
  - September 22
    - The Tall Men
  - September 30
    - The Trouble with Harry

=== October–December ===
- October 1955
  - October 7
    - Trial
  - October 11
    - Oklahoma!
  - October 19
    - The Treasure of Pancho Villa
  - October 29
    - Rebel Without a Cause
- November 1955
  - November 3
    - Guys and Dolls
  - November 7
    - Artists and Models
  - November 23
    - The Adventures of Quentin Durward
- December 1955
  - December 7
    - Picnic
    - The Last Frontier
  - December 12
    - The Rose Tattoo
  - December 13
    - Richard III
  - December 15
    - The Man with the Golden Arm
  - December 22
    - The Court-Martial of Billy Mitchell
    - Tarantula!
  - December 25
    - All That Heaven Allows
    - I'll Cry Tomorrow
  - Date unknown
    - Day the World Ended
    - The Phantom from 10,000 Leagues

== Top ten money making stars ==
Rank	Actor/Actress
1.	James Stewart
2.	Grace Kelly
3.	John Wayne
4.	William Holden
5.	Gary Cooper
6.	Marilyn Monroe
7. (tie)	Dean Martin; Jerry Lewis
8.	Marlon Brando
9.	Humphrey Bogart
10.	Clark Gable

== Notable films released in 1955 ==
United States unless stated

=== # ===
- 5 Against the House, starring Kim Novak, Guy Madison, Brian Keith

=== A ===
- Abbott and Costello Meet the Keystone Kops, starring Bud Abbott and Lou Costello, featuring an appearance by Mack Sennett
- Abbott and Costello Meet the Mummy, starring Bud Abbott and Lou Costello
- Above Us the Waves, starring John Mills – (GB)
- The Adventures of Quentin Durward, starring Robert Taylor, Kay Kendall
- Ain't Misbehavin', starring Piper Laurie, Rory Calhoun, Mamie Van Doren
- All That Heaven Allows, directed by Douglas Sirk, starring Jane Wyman and Rock Hudson
- The Americano, starring Glenn Ford
- Le Amiche (The Girlfriend), directed by Michelangelo Antonioni – (Italy)
- Anděl na horách (Angel in the Mountains) – (Czechoslovakia)
- Apache Ambush, starring Richard Jaeckel
- Artists and Models, starring Dean Martin, Jerry Lewis, Dorothy Malone, Shirley MacLaine
- Azaad, starring Dilip Kumar – (India)

=== B ===
- Bad Day at Black Rock, directed by John Sturges, starring Spencer Tracy, Robert Ryan, Walter Brennan
- Battle Cry, starring Van Heflin, Aldo Ray, Anne Francis
- The Beast with a Million Eyes
- Bedevilled, starring Anne Baxter and Steve Forrest
- The Big Combo, starring Cornel Wilde, Richard Conte, Brian Donlevy, Jean Wallace
- The Big Knife, starring Jack Palance, Ida Lupino, Jean Hagen, Rod Steiger, Shelley Winters
- Blackboard Jungle, starring Glenn Ford, Anne Francis, Louis Calhern, Sidney Poitier, Vic Morrow, Richard Kiley
- Blood Alley, starring John Wayne and Lauren Bacall
- A Bullet for Joey, starring Edward G. Robinson and George Raft

=== C ===
- Captain Lightfoot, starring Rock Hudson
- Carrington V.C., starring David Niven – (GB)
- Cast a Dark Shadow, starring Dirk Bogarde – (GB)
- Chief Crazy Horse, starring Victor Mature
- Cinerama Holiday
- Ciske de Rat (aka A Child Needs Love) – (Netherlands)
- The Cobweb, directed by Vincente Minnelli, starring Richard Widmark, Gloria Grahame, Lauren Bacall, Charles Boyer, Lillian Gish
- The Cockleshell Heroes, directed by and starring José Ferrer, with Trevor Howard – (GB)
- The Colditz Story, directed by Guy Hamilton, starring John Mills and Eric Portman – (GB)
- Confession, directed by Ken Hughes, starring Sydney Chaplin – (GB)
- The Constant Husband, starring Rex Harrison, Margaret Leighton, Kay Kendall – (GB)
- Count Three and Pray, starring Van Heflin, Joanne Woodward and Raymond Burr
- The Counterfeit Coin (Istoria mias kalpikis liras) – (Greece)
- The Court-Martial of Billy Mitchell, directed by Otto Preminger, starring Gary Cooper, Ralph Bellamy, Rod Steiger, Elizabeth Montgomery
- El Coyote
- Crashout, starring Arthur Kennedy and William Bendix
- The Criminal Life of Archibaldo de la Cruz (Ensayo de un Crimen), directed by Luis Buñuel – (Mexico)

=== D ===
- Daddy Long Legs, starring Fred Astaire and Leslie Caron
- The Dam Busters, starring Richard Todd and Michael Redgrave, with an early role by Robert Shaw – (GB)
- Davy Crockett, King of the Wild Frontier, starring Fess Parker and Buddy Ebsen
- Death of a Cyclist (Muerte de un ciclista), directed by Juan Antonio Bardem – (Spain)
- The Deep Blue Sea, starring Vivien Leigh – (GB)
- The Desperate Hours, starring Humphrey Bogart and Fredric March
- Devdas, based on novel with same name, starring Dilip Kumar, Vyjayanthimala, Suchitra Sen – (India)
- Les Diaboliques (The Devils), directed by Henri-Georges Clouzot, starring Simone Signoret – (France)
- Dreams (Kvinnodröm), directed by Ingmar Bergman, starring Eva Dahlbeck – (Sweden)

=== E ===
- East of Eden, directed by Elia Kazan, starring Julie Harris, James Dean (in his first major role), Raymond Massey
- The Enchanted Boy (Zakoldovanyy malchik) – (USSR)
- Escuela de vagabundos (School for Tramps), starring Pedro Infante – (Mexico)

=== F ===
- The Far Horizons, starring Fred MacMurray, Charlton Heston, Donna Reed, Barbara Hale
- The Fast and the Furious, starring John Ireland and Dorothy Malone
- Female on the Beach, starring Joan Crawford, Jeff Chandler, Jan Sterling
- Fire in the Night (Det brenner i natt!) – (Norway)
- Floating Clouds (Ukigumo) – (Japan)
- Footsteps in the Fog, starring Stewart Granger and Jean Simmons – (GB)
- Foxfire, starring Jane Russell
- Francis in the Navy, starring Donald O'Connor and Martha Hyer, with Clint Eastwood in an early role

=== G ===
- Galapagos, a documentary by Thor Heyerdahl – (Norway)
- A Generation (Pokolenie), directed by Andrzej Wajda – (Poland)
- The Girl in the Red Velvet Swing, directed by Richard Fleischer, starring Ray Milland, Joan Collins, Farley Granger – (U.S.)
- The Girl Rush, starring Rosalind Russell, Fernando Lamas, Gloria DeHaven
- Godzilla Raids Again (Gojira no Gyakushū) – (Japan)
- Good Morning, Miss Dove, starring Jennifer Jones and Robert Stack
- The Good Soldier Schweik, animation directed by Jiří Trnka – (Czechoslovakia)
- Guys and Dolls, directed by Joseph L. Mankiewicz, starring Marlon Brando, Jean Simmons, Frank Sinatra, Vivian Blaine

=== H ===
- Hell on Frisco Bay, starring Alan Ladd and Edward G. Robinson
- Hell's Island, starring John Payne and Mary Murphy
- Heroes of Shipka (Geroite na Shipka) – (Bulgaria/USSR)
- The Hidden One (La Escondida), starring Pedro Armendáriz – (Mexico)
- Hit the Deck, directed by Roy Rowland, starring Jane Powell, Debbie Reynolds, Ann Miller, Tony Martin, Vic Damone
- House of Bamboo, starring Robert Ryan
- How to Be Very, Very Popular, starring Betty Grable in her final film role

=== I ===
- I Am a Camera, starring Julie Harris and Laurence Harvey – (GB)
- I Died a Thousand Times, starring Jack Palance, Shelley Winters, Earl Holliman, Lee Marvin
- I Live in Fear (Ikimono no kiroku), directed by Akira Kurosawa – (Japan)
- I'll Cry Tomorrow, starring Susan Hayward
- Illegal, a film noir starring Edward G. Robinson and Jayne Mansfield
- Interrupted Melody, starring Eleanor Parker and Glenn Ford
- It Came from Beneath the Sea, starring Kenneth Tobey and Faith Domergue, with special effects by Ray Harryhausen
- It Happened on July 20th (Es geschah am 20. Juli), directed by G. W. Pabst, starring Bernhard Wicki – (Austria)
- It's Always Fair Weather, starring Gene Kelly, Dan Dailey, Michael Kidd, Cyd Charisse

=== J ===
- Jedda, directed by Charles Chauvel – (Australia)
- John and Julie, starring Moira Lister and Sid James – (GB)
- Journey to the Beginning of Time (Cesta do Pravěku) – (Czechoslovakia)
- Jupiter's Darling, directed by George Sidney, starring Esther Williams and Howard Keel

=== K ===
- Kanyasulkam, starring N. T. Rama Rao – (India)
- The Kentuckian, directed by and starring Burt Lancaster, featuring film debut of Walter Matthau
- Killer's Kiss, directed by Stanley Kubrick
- The King's Thief, starring Ann Blyth and David Niven
- Kiss Me Deadly, directed by Robert Aldrich, starring Ralph Meeker as Mickey Spillane's Mike Hammer

=== L ===
- Lady and the Tramp, an animated Disney musical featuring voice of Peggy Lee
- Lady Godiva of Coventry, starring Maureen O'Hara
- The Ladykillers, directed by Alexander Mackendrick, starring Alec Guinness, Cecil Parker, Herbert Lom, Peter Sellers – (GB)
- Land of the Pharaohs, starring Joan Collins and Jack Hawkins
- The Last Frontier, directed by Anthony Mann, starring Victor Mature, Robert Preston, Anne Bancroft
- The Last Ten Days (Der letzte Akt), directed by G. W. Pabst – (Austria/West Germany)
- The Left Hand of God, starring Humphrey Bogart and Gene Tierney
- Little Red Monkey, directed by Ken Hughes – (Britain)
- Lola Montès, directed by Max Ophüls – (France)
- The Long Gray Line, starring Tyrone Power and Maureen O'Hara
- Love Is a Many-Splendored Thing, starring William Holden and Jennifer Jones
- Love Me or Leave Me, starring Doris Day and James Cagney
- Love Never Dies (El Amor nunca muere) – (Argentina)
- Lucy Gallant (reissued as Oil Town), starring Jane Wyman

=== M ===
- Magdana's Donkey, directed by Tengiz Abuladze and Revaz Chkheidze – (Georgia)
- Magic Fire, starring Alan Badel
- Mambo, directed by Robert Rossen, starring Silvana Mangano, Vittorio Gassman, Shelley Winters – (U.S./Italy)
- A Man Alone, directed by and starring Ray Milland, with Mary Murphy
- The Man from Laramie, directed by Anthony Mann, starring James Stewart
- The Man Who Loved Redheads, starring Moira Shearer – (GB)
- The Man with the Golden Arm, directed by Otto Preminger, starring Frank Sinatra, Eleanor Parker, Darren McGavin, Kim Novak, Arnold Stang
- Man with the Gun, starring Robert Mitchum
- Man Without a Star, starring Kirk Douglas and William Campbell
- Marty, directed by Delbert Mann, starring Ernest Borgnine, Betsy Blair, Joe Mantell, Frank Sutton, Jerry Paris
- The McConnell Story, starring Alan Ladd and June Allyson
- The Mill of Good Luck (La 'Moara cu noroc') – (Romania)
- Miracle of Marcelino (Marcelino Pan Y Vino) – (Spain)
- Missamma, starring N. T. Rama Rao – (India)
- Mister Roberts, co-directed by John Ford and Mervyn LeRoy, starring Henry Fonda, James Cagney, William Powell, Jack Lemmon
- Moonfleet, starring Stewart Granger and Joan Greenwood
- Mr. & Mrs. '55, starring Guru Dutt and Madhubala – (India)
- Mr. Arkadin, directed by and starring Orson Welles – (France/Spain/Switzerland)
- My Sister Eileen, starring Janet Leigh and Betty Garrett

=== N ===
- New York Confidential, starring Broderick Crawford, Richard Conte, Marilyn Maxwell, Anne Bancroft
- Night and Fog, a documentary directed by Alain Resnais – (France)
- The Night My Number Came Up, starring Michael Redgrave – (GB)
- The Night of the Hunter, directed by Charles Laughton, starring Robert Mitchum, Shelley Winters, Lillian Gish, Peter Graves
- Not as a Stranger, starring Robert Mitchum, Olivia de Havilland, Frank Sinatra, Gloria Grahame, Broderick Crawford, Lon Chaney Jr.

=== O ===
- Oh, Ibuku (O, My Mother), directed by Ali Joego, debuting Aminah Cendrakasih – (Indonesia)
- Oklahoma! (first film shot in widescreen process known as Todd-AO), starring Gordon MacRae, Shirley Jones, Rod Steiger, Gloria Grahame
- Ordet (The Word), directed by Carl Theodor Dreyer – (Denmark)
- Our Best Days (Ayyamna al-Holwa), starring Omar Sharif – (Egypt)
- Out of the Clouds, directed by Basil Dearden, starring Anthony Steel, Robert Beatty – (U.K.)

=== P ===
- Passage Home, directed by Roy Ward Baker, starring Anthony Steel, Peter Finch, Diane Cilento – (U.K.)
- Pather Panchali (Song of the Little Road), directed by Satyajit Ray – (India)
- Pete Kelly's Blues, starring Jack Webb, Janet Leigh, Edmond O'Brien, Peggy Lee
- The Phenix City Story, starring Richard Kiley, John McIntire, John Larch, James Edwards, Edward Andrews
- Picnic, directed by Joshua Logan, starring William Holden, Kim Novak, Cliff Robertson, Rosalind Russell
- Prince of Players, starring Richard Burton
- Princess Yang Kwei-Fei (aka Yôkihi) – (Japan)
- The Prisoner, directed by Peter Glenville, starring Alec Guinness and Jack Hawkins – (GB)
- The Private War of Major Benson, starring Charlton Heston
- The Prodigal, starring Lana Turner

=== Q ===
- The Quatermass Xperiment – (GB)
- Queen Bee, starring Joan Crawford

=== R ===
- The Racers, starring Kirk Douglas, Gilbert Roland, Bella Darvi
- Radio Stories (Historias de la radio) – (Spain)
- Die Ratten (The Rats), starring Maria Schell and Curd Jürgens – (West Germany) – Golden Bear award
- Rage at Dawn, starring Randolph Scott
- The Rains of Ranchipur, starring Lana Turner and Richard Burton
- Rebel Without a Cause, directed by Nicholas Ray, starring James Dean, Sal Mineo, Natalie Wood
- Red Fish (Los peces rojos), starring Arturo de Córdova – (Spain)
- Richard III, directed by and starring Laurence Olivier, with Ralph Richardson, Claire Bloom, John Gielgud – (GB)
- Rififi (Du rififi chez les hommes), directed by Jules Dassin – (France)
- A Ripple in the Pond (Ena votsalo sti limni) – (Greece)
- Romeo and Juliet (Romeo i Dzhulyetta), starring Yuri Zhdanov and Galina Ulanova – (USSR)
- Roots (Raíces) – (Mexico)
- The Rose Tattoo, starring Anna Magnani and Burt Lancaster
- Run for Cover, starring James Cagney, John Derek, Ernest Borgnine

=== S ===
- Samurai II: Duel at Ichijoji Temple (Zoku Miyamoto Musashi: Ichijōji no kettō) – (Japan)
- Scandal in Sorrento (Pane, amore e...), starring Vittorio De Sica and Sophia Loren – (Italy)
- The Scarlet Coat, starring Cornel Wilde, George Sanders, Anne Francis
- The Sea Chase, starring John Wayne and Lana Turner
- Seagulls Die in the Harbour (Meeuwen sterven in de haven) – (Belgium)
- Seema, starring Nutan – (India)
- Seven Angry Men, starring Raymond Massey
- The Seven Little Foys, starring Bob Hope, featuring James Cagney reprising role of George M. Cohan from Yankee Doodle Dandy
- The Seven Year Itch, directed by Billy Wilder, starring Marilyn Monroe and Tom Ewell
- Shree 420, directed by and starring Raj Kapoor, with Nargis – (India)
- The Shrike, directed by and starring José Ferrer
- The Sign of Venus (Il segno di Venere), starring Sophia Loren and Vittorio De Sica – (Italy)
- Simba, starring Dirk Bogarde – (GB)
- Sissi, starring Romy Schneider – (Austria)
- Six Bridges to Cross, starring Tony Curtis
- Smiles of a Summer Night (Sommarnattens leende), directed by Ingmar Bergman – (Sweden)
- Son of Sinbad
- So This Is Paris, starring Tony Curtis and Gloria DeHaven
- The Spoilers, starring Anne Baxter and Jeff Chandler
- Strategic Air Command, starring James Stewart
- Stella, directed by Michael Cacoyannis, starring Melina Mercouri – (Greece)
- Storm Over the Nile, starring Anthony Steel and Laurence Harvey – (U.K.)
- Summertime, directed by David Lean, starring Katharine Hepburn, Rossano Brazzi, Darren McGavin – (Britain/U.S.)
- The Swindle (Il bidone), directed by Federico Fellini, starring Broderick Crawford – (Italy)

=== T ===
- Taira Clan Saga (Shin Heike Monogatari), directed by Kenji Mizoguchi – (Japan)
- Tall Man Riding, starring Randolph Scott and Dorothy Malone
- The Tall Men, starring Clark Gable, Jane Russell, Robert Ryan
- Tarantula, directed by Jack Arnold, starring John Agar, Mara Corday, with Clint Eastwood in a bit part
- The Tender Trap, starring Frank Sinatra, Debbie Reynolds, David Wayne, Celeste Holm
- That Lady, starring Olivia de Havilland – (GB/Spain)
- This Island Earth, directed by Joseph M. Newman, starring Jeff Morrow, Rex Reason, Faith Domergue, Russell Johnson
- Three for the Show, starring Betty Grable
- Tight Spot, starring Ginger Rogers, Edward G. Robinson, Brian Keith, Lorne Greene
- To Catch a Thief, directed by Alfred Hitchcock, starring Cary Grant and Grace Kelly
- To Hell and Back, starring Audie Murphy, Marshall Thompson, Charles Drake, David Janssen
- The Phantom from 10,000 Leagues, starring Kent Taylor, Cathy Downs, Michael Whalen
- The Treasure of Pancho Villa, starring Rory Calhoun and Shelley Winters
- Trial, starring Glenn Ford
- The Trouble with Harry, directed by Alfred Hitchcock, starring Edmund Gwenn, John Forsythe, Shirley MacLaine

=== U ===
- Unknown Soldier (Tuntematon sotilas) – (Finland)
- Unchained, starring Barbara Hale
- Underwater!, starring Jane Russell
- Untamed, starring Tyrone Power and Susan Hayward

=== V ===
- The Violent Men, starring Glenn Ford, Barbara Stanwyck, Edward G. Robinson, Brian Keith
- Violent Saturday, starring Victor Mature, Ernest Borgnine, Lee Marvin
- The Virgin Queen, starring Bette Davis, Richard Todd, Joan Collins

=== W ===
- We're No Angels, starring Humphrey Bogart, Peter Ustinov, Aldo Ray, Basil Rathbone
- White Feather, starring Robert Wagner, Jeffrey Hunter, Debra Paget
- Wichita, starring Joel McCrea
- The Woman in the Painting (Amici per la pelle) – (Italy)
- Women's Prison, starring Ida Lupino, Jan Sterling, Audrey Totter, Phyllis Thaxter

=== Y ===
- You're Never Too Young, starring Dean Martin and Jerry Lewis

== Serials ==
- The Adventures of Captain Africa
- King of the Carnival
- Panther Girl of the Kongo

== Short film series ==
- Looney Tunes (1930–1969)
- Terrytoons (1930–1964)
- Merrie Melodies (1931–1969)
- Popeye (1933–1957)
- Donald Duck (1934–1956)
- The Three Stooges (1934–1959)
- Tom and Jerry (1940–1958)
- Bugs Bunny (1940–1964)
- Mighty Mouse (1942–1955)
- Chip 'n' Dale (1943–1956)
- Droopy (1943–1958)
- Yosemite Sam (1945–1963)
- Ranger Don (1953–1956)
- Speedy Gonzales (1953–1968)

Cartoon:

- Good Will to Men (MGM Cartoon Series) (Frederick Quimby, William Hanna and Joseph Barbera, producers; MGM)
- The Legend of Rockabye Point (Walter Lantz Productions; Universal-International)
- No Hunting (Donald Duck Series) (Walt Disney Productions; RKO Radio)
- Speedy Gonzales (Merrie Melodies Series) (Warner Bros. Cartoons, Inc.; Warner Bros.)

One-Reel:

- Gadgets Galore (Warner Varieties Series) (Robert Youngson, producer; Warner Bros.)
- Survival City (Movietone CinemaScope Series) (Edmund Reek, producer; Twentieth Century-Fox)
- 3rd Ave. El (Carson Davidson Productions; Ardee Films)
- Three Kisses (Topper Special Series) (Justin Herman, producer; Paramount)

Two-Reel:

- The Battle of Gettysburg (Dore Schary, producer; MGM)
- The Face of Lincoln (University of Southern California Presentation; Cavalcade Pictures, Inc.)
- On The Twelfth Day...(United Kingdom Series) (Go Pictures, Inc.; George Brest and Associates)
- Switzerland (People and Places Series) (Walt Disney Productions; Buena Vista)
- 24-Hour Alert (Cedric Francis, producer; Warner Bros.)

== Births ==
- January 1 – Nicholas Farrell, English actor
- January 4 – Sergei Kolesnikov, Soviet-Russian actor (d. 2023)
- January 6 – Rowan Atkinson, English comedian and actor
- January 8 – Harriet Sansom Harris, American actress
- January 9 – J. K. Simmons, American actor
- January 15 – Sam Mercer, American producer (d. 2024)
- January 16 – Steven Weisberg, American editor (d. 2023)
- January 18 – Kevin Costner, American actor, producer and director
- January 19 – Paul Rodriguez, Mexican-American actor and stand-up comedian
- January 20 – Wyatt Knight, American actor (d. 2011)
- January 22 – John Wesley Shipp, American actor
- January 26 – Björn Andrésen, Swedish actor (d. 2025)
- January 28 – Lorenzo Caccialanza, American actor
- February 2 – Michael Talbott, American actor
- February 5 – Kenji Ohba, Japanese actor
- February 7 – Miguel Ferrer, American actor (d. 2017)
- February 8 – Ethan Phillips, American actor
- February 9
  - Jim J. Bullock, American actor and comedian
  - Charles Shaughnessy, British actor
- February 14 – James Eckhouse, American actor
- February 15 – Christopher McDonald, American actor
- February 17
  - Ellie Haddington, Scottish actress
  - Shun Sugata, Japanese actor
- February 19 – Jeff Daniels, American actor
- February 21 – Kelsey Grammer, American actor and comedian
- February 27 – Rene Kirby, American actor (d. 2025)
- February 28
  - Gilbert Gottfried, American stand-up comedian, actor and voice actor (d. 2022)
  - Robin B. Smith, South African actor
- March 2 – William Hope, Canadian actor
- March 3 – Riina Hein, Estonian actress, director, producer and screenwriter
- March 4 – Dominique Pinon, French actor
- March 6
  - Larry Cedar, American actor
  - James Saito, Japanese-American actor
  - Alberta Watson, Canadian actress (d. 2015)
- March 7 – Anupam Kher, Indian actor, director and producer
- March 9 – Ornella Muti, Italian actress
- March 13 – Glenne Headley, American actress (d. 2017)
- March 16 – Kuh Ledesma, Filipino actress and singer
- March 17
  - Mark Boone Junior, American character actor
  - Gary Sinise, American actor, producer and director
- March 19 – Bruce Willis, American actor
- March 22 – Lena Olin, Swedish actress
- March 26 – Paul Lazar, American actor
- March 28 – Reba McEntire, American country singer-songwriter, actress and record producer
- March 29
  - Brendan Gleeson, Irish actor and film director
  - Christopher Lawford, American actor (d. 2018)
  - Marina Sirtis, American-English actress
- April 3
  - Tomas Arana, American actor
  - Uri Gavriel, Israeli actor
- April 4 – Casey Biggs, American actor
- April 5 – Akira Toriyama, Japanese manga artist (d. 2024)
- April 6 – Michael Rooker, American actor
- April 8 – Kane Hodder, American actor and stuntman
- April 17 – David Lowe, English actor and director
- April 23 – Judy Davis, Australian actress
- April 24 – Michael O'Keefe, American actor
- April 29
  - Leslie Jordan, American actor, comedian, writer and singer (d. 2022)
  - Kate Mulgrew, American actress
- April 30 – Zlatko Topčić, Bosnian screenwriter
- May 1 – Eric Goldberg, American animator, voice actor, director and producer
- May 5 – Lisa Jane Persky, American actress
- May 8 – Raoul Trujillo, American actor
- May 9 – Kevin Peter Hall, American actor (d. 1991)
- May 10 – Larry "Flash" Jenkins, American actor, director, producer and screenwriter (d. 2019)
- May 13 – María Cecilia Botero, Colombian actress and television presenter
- May 15
  - Martha Gehman, American actress
  - Lee Horsley, American actor
- May 16 – Debra Winger, American actress
- May 17
  - Francesco Nuti, Italian actor, director and screenwriter (d. 2023)
  - Bill Paxton, American actor (d. 2017)
- May 18 – Chow Yun-fat, Hong Kong actor
- May 23
  - Kario Salem, American actor and screenwriter
  - Kristin Rudrüd, American actress
- May 27 – Richard Schiff, American actor and director
- May 29 – Daniel Greene, American actor
- May 31
  - Susie Essman, American actress
  - Julio Oscar Mechoso, American actor (d. 2017)
- June 2
  - Dana Carvey, American actor and comedian
  - Vickilyn Reynolds, American actress and singer
- June 6
  - Sandra Bernhard, American actress, comedian and singer
  - Cheryl Smith, American actress and musician (d. 2002)
- June 7 – William Forsythe, American actor
- June 8
  - Griffin Dunne, American actor and director
  - Andrew Stevens, American actor and producer
- June 14 – Paul O'Grady, English comedian, broadcaster, actor and writer (d. 2023)
- June 15
  - Polly Draper, American actress, writer, producer and director
  - Julie Hagerty, American actress
  - Andy Tennant, American screenwriter, director and actor
- June 16 – Laurie Metcalf, American actress
- June 18 – Leon Herbert, British actor
- June 21 – David Marshall Grant, American actor, singer and writer
- June 25 – Michael McShane, American actor, singer and improvisational comedian
- June 26 – Gedde Watanabe, American actor and comedian
- June 27 – Isabelle Adjani, French actress
- July 2 – Andrew Divoff, American actor and producer
- July 3
  - Bruce Altman, American actor
  - Jesse Corti, American actor
  - Vince Martin, Dutch-Australian actor, editor, director and musician
- July 7 – Rolf Saxon, American actor and voiceover artist
- July 8 – Lena Endre, Swedish actress
- July 9
  - Lisa Banes, American actress (d. 2021)
  - Jimmy Smits, American actor
- July 13
  - Lance E. Nichols, American actor
  - Manuel Padilla Jr., American child actor (d. 2008)
- July 21 – Béla Tarr, Hungarian director (d. 2026)
- July 22 – Willem Dafoe, American actor
- July 25 – Iman, Somali-American model and actress
- July 27 – Roger Guenveur Smith, American actor, director and writer
- July 28
  - Maria Vacratsis, Canadian actress
  - Dey Young, American actress
- July 29 – Jean-Hugues Anglade, French actor, director and screenwriter
- August 3 – Corey Burton, American voice actor
- August 4 – Billy Bob Thornton, American actor, director and screenwriter
- August 7 – Wayne Knight, American actor and comedian
- August 13 – Paul Greengrass, British director, producer and screenwriter
- August 15 – Neena Kulkarni, Indian actress
- August 19 – Peter Gallagher, American actor
- August 20 – Jay Acovone, American actor
- August 22 – Gordon Liu, Chinese actor and martial artist
- August 24 – Kevin Dunn, American actor
- August 27
  - Nichola McAuliffe, English actress and writer
  - Diana Scarwid, American actress
- September 1 – Billy Blanks, American actor and martial artist
- September 3 – Annie McEnroe, American actress
- September 9 – Edward Hibbert, American-born British actor
- September 10 – Giannina Facio, Costa Rican actress
- September 12 – Peter Scolari, American actor (d. 2021)
- September 17
  - Antoni Corone, American actor and producer
  - Charles Martinet, American actor and voice actor
- September 20
  - Betsy Brantley, American actress
  - David Haig, British actor and playwright
- September 21 – Rick Aiello, American actor (d. 2021)
- September 26 – Mark Nelson, American actor and director
- October 3 – Tommy Wiseau, American actor and director
- October 5 – Ángela Molina, Spanish actress
- October 10 – Hippolyte Girardot, French actor, director and screenwriter
- October 17 – Sam Bottoms, American actor and producer (d. 2008)
- October 20 – Thomas Newman, American composer
- October 21
  - Paul Greco, American actor and musician (d. 2008)
  - Catherine Hardwicke, American director and screenwriter
- October 22 – Bill Condon, American director and screenwriter
- October 27 – Michael Shamus Wiles, American character actor
- November 5 – Nestor Serrano, American actor
- November 9
  - Karen Dotrice, British actress
  - Thomas F. Duffy, American actor
- November 10
  - Roland Emmerich, German director, screenwriter and producer
  - Clare Higgins, English actress
- November 11 - Stephen Lee, American actor (d. 2014)
- November 13 – Whoopi Goldberg, American actress and comedian
- November 15 – Jun Kunimura, Japanese actor
- November 23 – Peter Douglas, American actor and producer
- November 25 – Bruce Hopkins, New Zealand actor
- November 27 – Bill Nye, American television presenter
- November 30
  - Kevin Conroy, American actor (d. 2022)
  - Malgorzata Gebel, Polish actress
- December 2 – Dennis Christopher, American actor
- December 3
  - Melody Anderson, Canadian actress
  - Steven Culp, American actor
- December 6 – Steven Wright, American stand-up comedian, actor, writer and film producer
- December 8 – Kevin McNulty, Canadian actor
- December 9 – Hiroyuki Watanabe, Japanese actor (d. 2022)
- December 11 – Donna Bullock, American actress
- December 16 – Xander Berkeley, American actor
- December 17 – Richard Young, American character actor, filmmaker and screenwriter
- December 21 – Jane Kaczmarek, American actress
- December 24
  - Clarence Gilyard, American actor (d. 2022)
  - Grand L. Bush, American former actor

== Deaths ==
- February 11 – Ona Munson, 51, American actress, Five Star Final, Gone with the Wind
- February 12
  - Tom Moore, 71, Irish-American actor, Forever Amber, Road House
  - S. Z. Sakall, 72, Hungarian actor, Casablanca, Yankee Doodle Dandy
- April 7 – Theda Bara, 69, American silent film actress, A Fool There Was, Cleopatra
- April 25 – Constance Collier, 77, British actress, Stage Door, Rope
- May 4 – Robert Kent, 46, American actor, Blonde Comet, The Phantom Rider
- May 13 – Betty Ann Davies, 44, British actress, My Old Duchess, The Man in Black
- May 22 – Richard "Skeets" Gallagher, 63, American actor, Possessed, Idiot's Delight
- June 11 – Walter Hampden, 75, American actor, Sabrina, The Hunchback of Notre Dame
- July 31 – Robert Francis, 25, American actor, The Caine Mutiny, The Long Gray Line, airplane accident
- August 5 – Carmen Miranda, 46, Brazilian singer and actress, Copacabana, The Gang's All Here
- August 6 – Janet Beecher, 70, American actress, The Story of Vernon and Irene Castle, The Mark of Zorro
- August 10 – Jane Murfin, 70, American screenwriter, What Price Hollywood?, The Women
- August 12 – Lynne Carver, 38, American actress, Everybody Sing, Young Dr. Kildare
- September 20
  - Robert Riskin, 58, American screenwriter, It Happened One Night, Mr. Deeds Goes to Town
  - Noel M. Smith, 60, American director, Secret Service of the Air, Cattle Town
- September 30 – James Dean, 24, American actor, Rebel Without a Cause, East of Eden, automobile accident
- October 1 – Charles Christie, 73, Canadian pioneer film studio owner
- October 9 – Alice Joyce, 65, American actress, The Green Goddess, White Man
- October 19 – John Hodiak, 41, American actor, Lifeboat, A Bell for Adano, heart attack
- October 20 – Frank Darien, 79, American actor, The Grapes of Wrath, Under Fiesta Stars
- November 9 – Tom Powers, 65, American actor, Double Indemnity, The Blue Dahlia
- November 14 – Robert E. Sherwood, 59, American screenwriter, The Best Years of Our Lives, Rebecca
- November 15 – Lloyd Bacon, 65, American director, The Oklahoma Kid, Knute Rockne, All American
- November 22 – Shemp Howard, 60, American actor, comedian of The Three Stooges, The Bank Dick, Pittsburgh
- November 27 – William Nigh, 74, American director, Mr. Wong, Detective, The Gay Cavalier
- December 5 – Paul Harvey, 73, American actor, April in Paris, Calamity Jane
- December 24 – Nana Bryant, 67, American actress, Public Enemies, Bathing Beauty

== Film Debuts ==
- Zofia Czerwińska – A Generation
- Lorella De Luca – Il Bidone
- Ed Devereaux – Little Red Monkey
- Sunil Dutt – Railway Platform
- Clint Eastwood – Revenge of the Creature
- Jamie Farr – Blackboard Jungle
- Shirley Anne Field – Simon and Laura
- Liz Fraser – Touch and Go
- Kathy Garver – The Night of the Hunter
- Dennis Hopper – Rebel Without a Cause
- Jill Ireland – No Love for Judy
- L. Q. Jones – Battle Cry
- Shirley Jones – Oklahoma!
- George Leech – The Ladykillers
- Len Lesser – Shack Out on 101
- Tanya Lopert – Summertime
- Shirley MacLaine – The Trouble with Harry
- Lea Massari – Proibito
- Walter Matthau – The Kentuckian
- Jody McCrea – Lucy Gallant
- Patrick McGoohan – Passage Home
- Dick Miller – Apache Woman
- Sandra Milo – The Bachelor
- Vic Morrow – Blackboard Jungle
- Simon Oakland – The Desperate Hours
- Jerry Orbach – Marty
- Leslie Parrish – A Man Called Peter
- Oliver Reed – Value for Money
- Claude Rich – The Grand Maneuver
- Maximilian Schell – Children, Mother, and the General
- James Sikking – Five Guns West
- Lois Smith – East of Eden
- George Takei – Godzilla Raids Again
- Jean-Louis Trintignant – If All the Guys in the World
- Concha Velasco – The Moorish Queen
- Joanne Woodward – Count Three and Pray
