= List of Spanish films of 1955 =

Spanish films released in 1955

A list of films produced in Spain in 1955 (see 1955 in film).

== 1955 ==
Title	Director	Cast	Genre	Notes
1955
Death of a Cyclist	Juan Antonio Bardem	Lucia Bosé, Alberto Closas, Manuel Alexandre	Drama	Cannes Award. Spanish Neorealism
It Happened in Seville	José Gutiérrez Maesso	Juanita Reina, Rubén Rojo, Alfredo Mayo	Musical	
Marta	Francisco Elías	Mario Cabré, Elisa Montés, Ernesto Vilches	Drama	
The Miller’s Saucy Wife	León Klimovsky	Carmen Sevilla, Francisco Rabal, Mischa Auer, Madeleine Lebeau	Comedy, Musical, Romance	Co-production with France
The Miracle of Marcelino	Ladislao Vajda	Pablito Calvo	Christian	Won awards at Cannes and Berlin
Radio Stories	José Luis Sáenz de Heredia	Francisco Rabal, José Isbert, Alberto Romea	Comedy	Film with three episodes. Spanish Neorealism
The Red Fish	José Antonio Nieves Conde	Arturo de Córdova, Emma Penella, Félix Dafauce	Film Noir	
Sighs of Triana	Ramón Torrado	Paquita Rico, Antonio Riquelme, Juan Calvo	Musical	
Sin la sonrisa de Dios	Julio Salvador	Conrado San Martín, Julia Caba Alba		
Tangier Assignment	César Fernández Ardavín	Fernando Rey, Bob Simmons, Gustavo Re	Crime	Co-production with UK
Señora Ama	Julio Bracho	Dolores del Río, José Suárez	Drama	Spanish-Mexican coproduction
