= Angela Melillo =

Italian actress

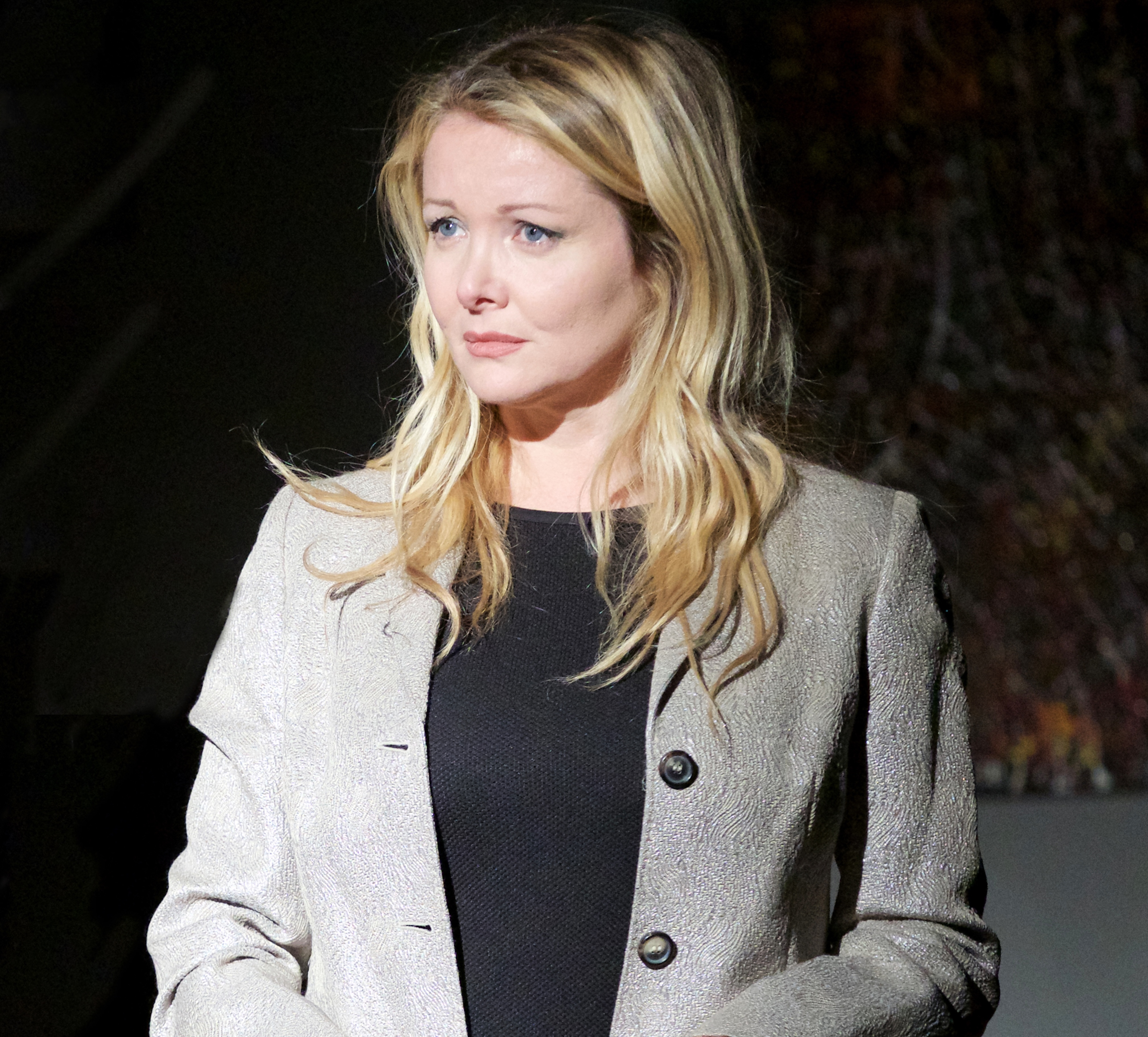
- Born: 20 June 1967 (age 58); Rome, Italy
- Occupations: Dancer; actress
- Years active: 1992 – present
- Height: 170 cm (5 ft 7 in)
- Spouse: Ezio Bastianelli (m. 2006–2013)
- Children: 1
- Website: www.angelamelillo.it

Angela Melillo (born 20 June 1967) is an Italian dancer, actress and television personality.

== Biography ==
She began her career in the entertainment world as a dancer, but her verve immediately suggested that she had more skills and a strong desire to emerge. In the 1991/1992 season, she was a showgirl at Il TG delle vacanze, where she danced with Gabriella Labate, and at various shows in the Bagaglino, first as a dancer in Creme caramel e Rose rosse, and later as a prima donna in Tutte pazze per Silvio, Al Bagaglino, Marameo and Mi consenta.

In 1992 she joined Teo Teocoli and Gene Gnocchi in conducting the first edition of Scherzi a parte, on Italia 1. From 1999 to 2001 she joined Paolo Limiti in conducting Alle due on Rai Uno.

In addition to her television career, from 2000 to 2005 she participated in several Mediaset and Rai TV series: La casa delle beffe, Love Bugs, La palestra and Il maresciallo Rocca.

In 2004 she was among the competitors of the Rai 2 reality show The Mole, which she won, proving her ability to overcome hard psychophysical tests. In 2004–2005 she was in the permanent cast of Domenica in.

In 2006 she played the role of Tiziana Palme in the Rai 1 soap-opera Sottocasa. In 2007 she played the role of Princess Luisa di Carignano in the TV miniseries La figlia di Elisa - Ritorno a Rivombrosa, directed by Stefano Alleva. From 11 October 2010 she replaced Luana Ravegnini as a co-presenter of Rai Due's TV mania alongside Simone Annicchiarico. The program, however, was canceled after the second episode due to low ratings. In October 2016 she starred in the theater comedy Una fidanzata per papà with Sandra Milo, Savino Zaba and Stefano Antonucci.

== Television ==
=== Dancer ===
- Cocco (Rai 2, 1989)
- Stasera mi butto (Rai 2, 1990)
- Crème Caramel (Rai 1, 1991-1992)
- Il TG delle vacanze (Canale 5, 1991-1992)
- Scherzi a parte (Italia 1, 1992)
- Il grande gioco dell'oca (Rai 2, 1993)
- Una voce per Sanremo (Tmc, 1993)
- Saluti e baci (Rai 1, 1993)
- Bucce di banana (Rai 1, 1994)
- Beato tra le donne (Rai 1, 1994)
- Rose Rosse (Canale 5, 1996)
- Gran Caffè (Canale 5, 1998)
- La zingara (Rai 1, 1999)

=== Other ===
- Il grande gioco del Mercante in fiera (Tmc, 1996)
- Alle due su Rai Uno (Rai 1, 1999-2000) – Co-presenter
- Sereno variabile (Rai 2, 2001) – Co-presenter
- Marameo (Canale 5, 2002)
- Mi consenta (Canale 5, 2003)
- La Talpa (Rai 2, 2004) – Competitor, won
- Domenica in (Rai 1, 2004-2005) – Co-presenter
- Facce ride Show (Rete 4, 2006)
- Bellissima - Cabaret anti crisi (Canale 5, 2009)
- TV Mania (Rai 2, 2010) – Permanent guest

== Filmography ==
=== Television ===
- La casa delle beffe 2000 – TV miniseries – Canale 5
- La palestra 2003 – TV film– Canale 5 – as Valentina
- Il maresciallo Rocca 5 2005 – TV, 2 episodes – Rai 1 – as Elena Neccini
- Sottocasa 2006 – TV – Rai 1 – as Tiziana Palme
- Don Matteo 2006 – TV, 1 episode – Rai 1 – as Marina
- La figlia di Elisa – Ritorno a Rivombrosa 2007 – Miniserie TV, 8 episodes – Canale 5 – as Princess Luisa di Carignano

=== Cinema ===
- Impotenti esistenziali, directed by Giuseppe Cirillo (2009)
- Al posto tuo, directed by Max Croci (2016)

== Theater ==
- "Tre Tre Giù Giulio" directed by Pier Francesco Pingitore
- "La Vedova Allegra" directed by Gino Landi
- "Troppa Trippa" directed by P. Pingitore
- "Crem Caramel" directed by P. Pingitore
- "Mavaffallopoli" directed by P. Pingitore
- "Tutte pazze per Silvio" directed by P. Pingitore
- "Romolo e Remolo" directed by P. Pingitore
- "Facce ride show" directed by P. Pingitore
- "Miracolo a teatro" directed by G. Liguori
- "Fashion e confucion" [sic] directed by P. Mellucci
- "Una fidanzata per papà" directed by P. Moriconi
