= The Big Lie (1956 film) =

- Directed by: Rafael Gil
- Written by: Vicente Escrivá; Ramón D. Faraldo
- Starring: Francisco Rabal; Madeleine Fischer; Jacqueline Pierreux
- Cinematography: Alfredo Fraile; Federico G. Larraya
- Edited by: José Antonio Rojo
- Music by: Jesús Guridi
- Production company: Aspa Producciones Cinematográficas
- Distributed by: As Films
- Release date: 1 April 1956
- Running time: 100 minutes
- Country: Spain
- Language: Spanish

The Big Lie (Spanish: La gran mentira) is a 1956 Spanish film directed by Rafael Gil and starring Francisco Rabal, Madeleine Fischer and Jacqueline Pierreux.

== Synopsis ==
César Neira, a declining actor, sees his chance to succeed again thanks to the inclusion in his film of a paralyzed teacher who has become very popular thanks to a radio contest.

== Cast ==
- Francisco Rabal as César Neira
- Madeleine Fischer as Teresa Camps
- Jacqueline Pierreux as Sara Millán
- Manolo Morán as Representante de César
- Emilio Alonso
- Julio F. Alymán as Maquillador
- Rafaela Aparicio as Vecina de La Molina
- Rafael Bardem as Tío de Teresa
- Gustavo Biosca
- Irene Caba Alba as Vecina de La Molina
- Rafael Calvo Revilla as Doctor
- José Calvo as Productor que habla con censor
- Pedro Chicote
- Carlos Ciscar
- Rafael Cortés
- Bobby Deglané
- Teresa del Río
- Juan Domenech as Paulino Sándalo
- Ángel de Echenique
- Ramón Elías as Manolo Rodríguez
- Fernando Fernán Gómez
- José Ramón Giner as Guionista pesado
- Julio Goróstegui as Dueño del cine
- Rufino Inglés
- Ángel Jordán as Raúl Estrada
- Milagros Leal as Vecina de La Molina
- Sergio Mendizábal
- Jorge Mistral
- Antonio Ozores
- José Luis Ozores
- Erasmo Pascual
- Francisco Puyol
- Antonio Ramallets
- Luis Rivera
- José Samitier
- Pilar Sanclemente
- Juan Segarra
- Carlos Miguel Solá as Apuntador
- José Luis Sáenz de Heredia
- Francisco Sánchez as Productor catalán en la fiesta
- José Tamayo
- Ángela Tamayo
- José Villasante
- Álvarez Álvarez
- Ángel Álvarez as Guionista de Sándalo
- Vicente Ávila

== Bibliography ==
- de España, Rafael. Directory of Spanish and Portuguese film-makers and films. Greenwood Press, 1994.
