= List of Soviet films of 1955 =

A list of films produced in the Soviet Union in 1955 (see 1955 in film).

== 1955 ==
Title	Russian title	Director	Cast	Genre	Notes
1955
Behind Show Windows	За витриной универмага	Samson Samsonov	Oleg Anofriev	Comedy	
The Crash of the Emirate	Крушение эмирата	Vladimir Basov, Latif Faiziyev	Yevgeny Samoylov	Drama	
The Drummer's Fate	Судьба барабанщика	Viktor Eisymont	Daniil Sagal	Drama	
The Enchanted Boy	Заколдованный мальчик	Vladimir Polkovnikov, Aleksandra Snezhko-Blotskaya	Valentina Sperantova	Animation	
The First Echelon	Первый эшелон	Mikhail Kalatozov	Vsevolod Sanayev, Nikolay Annenkov, Oleg Yefremov, Izolda Izvitskaya	Drama	
Gadfly	Овод	Aleksandr Fajntsimmer	Oleg Strizhenov, Nikolai Simonov	Drama	
Good Morning	Доброе утро	Andrey Frolov	Tatyana Konyukhova	Comedy	
The Grasshopper	Попрыгунья	Samson Samsonov	Lyudmila Tselikovskaya, Sergei Bondarchuk, Vladimir Druzhnikov	Drama	
Heroes of Shipka	Герои Шипки	Sergei Vasilyev	Ivan Pereverzev, Apostol Karamitev, Viktor Avdyushko, Georgi Yumatov	War drama	co-produced with Bulgaria
Lyana	Ляна	Boris Barnet	Kyunna Ignatova	Comedy	
The Mexican	Мексиканец	Vladimir Kaplunovsky	Oleg Strizhenov, Boris Andreyev	Drama	
Mikhaylo Lomonosov	Михайло Ломоносов	Aleksandr Ivanov	Boris Livanov		
Mother	Мать	Mark Donskoi	Vera Maretskaya, Aleksey Batalov, Tatyana Piletskaya	Drama	Entered into the 1956 Cannes Film Festival
Princess Mary	Княжна Мери	Isidor Annensky	Anatoliy Verbitskiy	Comedy	
Private Ivan	Солдат Иван Бровкин	Ivan Lukinsky	Leonid Kharitonov, Tatyana Pelttser	Comedy	
Romeo and Juliet	Ромео и Джульетта	Lev Arnshtam	Galina Ulanova, Aleksey Yermolayev	Tragedy	Entered into the 1955 Cannes Film Festival
The Road	Дорога	Aleksandr Stolper	Andrei Popov, Vitali Doronin, Nikolai Gritsenko	Action	
Road to Life	Педагогическая поэма	Aleksei Maslyukov, Mechislava Mayevskaya	Vladimir Yemelyanov, Georgi Yumatov	Drama	Entered into the 1956 Cannes Film Festival
Smoke in the Forest	Дым в лесу	Yuri Chulyukin, Yevgeny Karelov	Anatoli Berladin	Adventure	
Son	Сын	Yuri Ozerov	Leonid Kharitonov	Drama	
Spring Voices	Весенние голоса	Sergei Gurov, Eldar Ryazanov	Vladimir Salnikov	Musical	
Twelfth Night	Двенадцатая ночь	Yan Frid	Klara Luchko, Mikhail Yanshin, Vasili Merkuryev	Comedy	
Two Captains	Два капитана	Vladimir Vengerov	Aleksandr Mikhaylov	Adventure	
Unfinished Story	Неоконченная повесть	Fridrikh Ermler	Elina Bystritskaya	Drama	
Vasyok Trubachyov and His Comrades	Васёк Трубачёв и его товарищи	Ilya Frez	Oleg Vishnev	Adventure	

== See also ==
- 1955 in the Soviet Union
