= Al posto tuo =

- Directed by: Max Croci
- Written by: Massimo di Nicola
- Produced by: Rodeo Drive and Rai Cinema with contribution of MiBACT in collaboration with Banca Popolare di Sondrio
- Starring: Luca Argentero; Stefano Fresi; Ambra Angiolini
- Music by: Alessandro Faro
- Release date: September 29, 2016
- Language: Italian

Al posto tuo (transl. At your place) is a 2016 Italian comedy film written by Massimo di Nicola and directed by Max Croci and starring Luca Argentero, Ambra Angiolini and Angela Melillo.

== Plot ==
Luca Molteni and Rocco Fontana are two creative directors of a company that produces plumbing fixtures, where the first is a single architect by choice, sexy, who lives in a town, while the other is an architect who lives in a country house, married to Claudia and with three children. When they discover the companies they work want to fusion, their German sadic director proposes to them, to win the only position of manager in the new society, a "life exchange": for a week they will have to exchange their homes and adopt the same daily habits of the other.

== Cast ==
- Luca Argentero: as Luca Molteni
- Stefano Fresi: as Rocco Fontana
- Ambra Angiolini: as Claudia
- Serena Rossi: as Anna
- Grazia Schiavo: as Ines
- Fioretta Mari: as Erminia
- Livio Beshir: as Artois
- Carolina Poccioni: as Alice
- Marco Todisco: as Salvo
- Giulietta Rebeggiani: as Sarah
- Gualtiero Burzi: as Bellatreccia
- Pia Lanciotti: as Mrs Welter
- Giulia Greco: as Mara
- Nicola Stravalaci: as Rosario
- Haruhiko Yamanouchi: as Dr. Shimura
- Roberta Mengozzi: as Interprete
- Angela Melillo: as Alba
- Riccardo Mandolini: as Salvo

== See also ==
- List of Italian films of 2016
