= Impotenti esistenziali =

2009 film

- Directed by: Giuseppe Cirillo
- Written by: Giuseppe Cirillo
- Produced by: Elite Group International
- Starring: Giuseppe Cirillo; Antonella Ponziani; Tinto Brass; Alvaro Vitali; Sandra Milo; Don Backy; Angela Melillo; Gianni Nazzaro
- Music by: Giuseppe Cirillo, Ciu Ranieri
- Release date: 2009
- Language: Italian

Impotenti esistenziali is a 2009 Italian comedy film written and directed by Giuseppe Cirillo and starring Tinto Brass, Sandra Milo and Alvaro Vitali.

== Plot ==
Giuseppe, psychologist and professor of sex education, thinks to be the punisher of society against hypocrisy. A day, in a private club, he meets Francesca, Riccardo's wife, and has a relationship with her.

== Cast ==
- Giuseppe Cirillo: Giuseppe
- Antonella Ponziani: Francesca
- Tinto Brass: De Fortis
- Alvaro Vitali: Amilcare
- Sandra Milo: aunt Elisabetta
- Don Backy: father Giovanni
- Angela Melillo: Angela
- Gianni Nazzaro: manager Riccardo

== See also ==
- List of Italian films of 2009
