= List of Japanese films of 1955 =

A list of films released in Japan in 1955 (see 1955 in film).

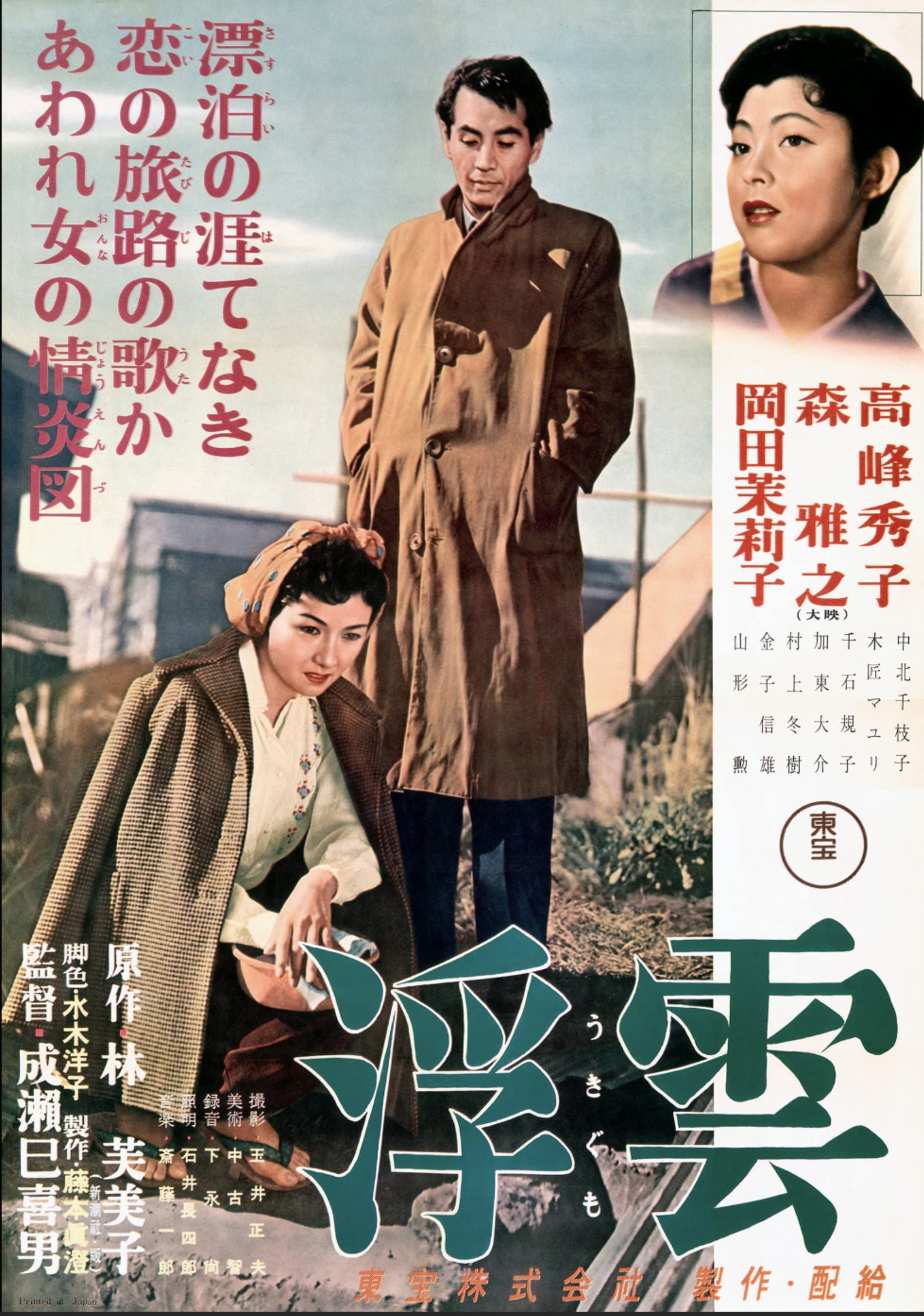
Floating Clouds

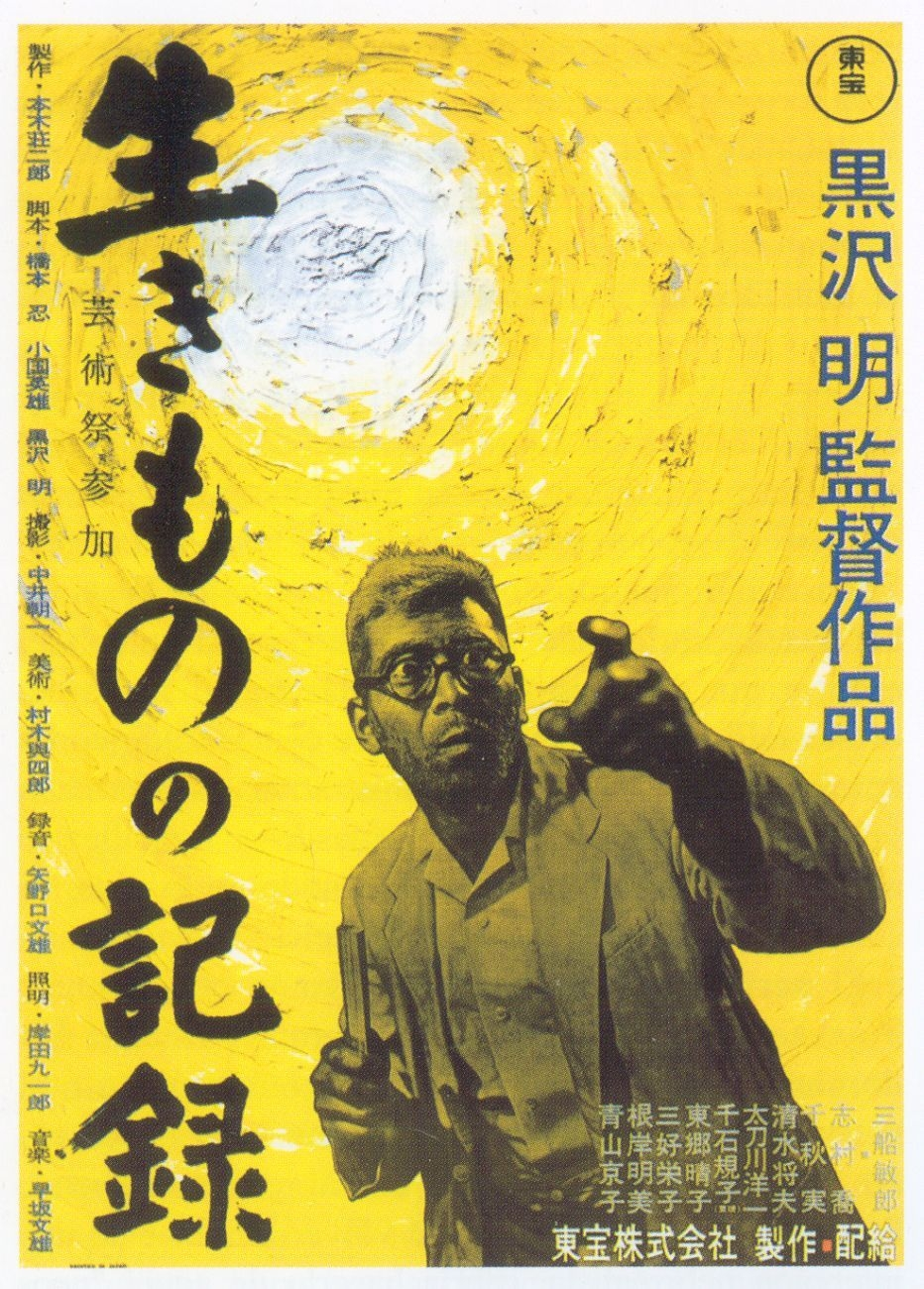
I Live in Fear

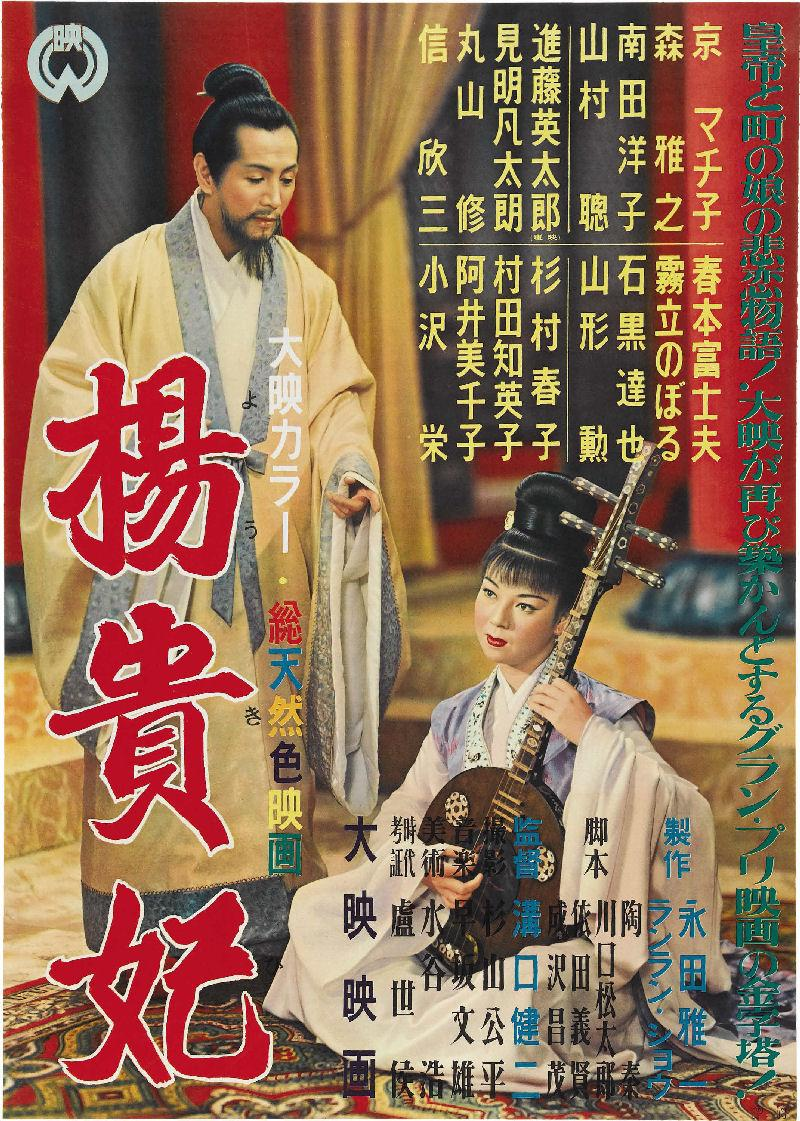
Princess Yang Kwei-Fei

Title	Director	Cast	Genre	Notes
All Is Well	Toshio Sugie	Toshiro Mifune, Asami Kuji, Akira Takarada	—	
All is Well Part 2	Toshio Sugie	Toshiro Mifune, Asami Kuji, Akira Takarada	—	
The Eternal Breasts	Kinuyo Tanaka	Yumeji Tsukioka, Ryoji Hayama	Drama, biopic	
Floating Clouds	Mikio Naruse	Hideko Takemine, Masayuki Mori, Mariko Okada	Drama	
A Girl Isn't Allowed to Love	Teinosuke Kinugasa	Kazuo Hasegawa; Ayako Wakao, Raizo Ichikawa	Drama	
Godzilla Raids Again	Motoyoshi Oda	Hiroshi Koizumi, Minoru Chiaki, Takashi Shimura	—	
Half Human	Ishirō Honda	Momoko Kouchi, Akira Takarada	—	
Hatsukoi wautsu	Kenta Kimoto	Kyoko Aoyama, Akira Takarada, Kenichi "Enoken" Enomoto, Kingoro Yanagiya	—	
Hatsuwarai sokonuke tabi niki	Nobuo Aoyagi	Kenichi "Enoken" Enomoto, Kingoro Yanagiya, Tony Tani	—	
The Heart	Kon Ichikawa	Masayuki Mori, Michiyo Aratama	Drama	
I Live in Fear	Akira Kurosawa	Toshiro Mifune, Takashi Shimura, Minoru Chiaki	Drama	
The Immortal Pitcher	Hideo Suzuki	Ryō Ikebe, Yoko Tsukasa, Chishū Ryū	—	
Jyazu musume kanpai	Umetsugu Inoue	Chiemi Eri, Izumi Yukimura, Junzaburo Ban	—	
Love Never Fails	Shiro Toyoda	Akira Kubo, Kyoko Aoyama, Yoichi Tachikawa	Drama	
Lovetide	Ishirō Honda	Ryō Ikebe, Hiroshi Koizumi, Fubuki Koshiji		
A Man Among Men	Kaijiro Yamamoto	Kōji Tsuruta, Toshiro Mifune, Mariko Okada	Crime thriller	
Ningyo Sashichi torimonocho - Mekura okami	Masahiro Makino	Hiroshi Koizumi, Jun Tazaki, Takashi Shimura	—	
No Response from Car 33	Senkichi Taniguchi	Ryō Ikebe, Yoko Tsukasa, Takashi Shimura	Crime drama	
No Time for Tears	Seiji Maruyama	Takashi Shimura, Toshiro Mifune, Mariko Okada	Drama	
Owarai torimonocho - Hatchant hatsutegara	Nobuo Aoyagi	Kenichi "Enoken" Enomoto, Kingoror Yanagiya, Roppa Furukawa	—	
The Phantom Horse	Koji Shima	Ayako Wakao, Yoshiro Kitahara	Drama	Entered into the 1956 Cannes Film Festival
Princess Yang Kwei-Fei	Kenji Mizoguchi	Machiko Kyō, Masayuki Mori	Historical drama	
The Rookie Manager	Hideo Suzuki	Ryō Ikebe, Izumi Yukimura, Kamatari Fujiwara	—	
Samurai II: Duel at Ichijoji Temple	Hiroshi Inagaki	Toshirō Mifune, Kōji Tsuruta	—	
Taira Clan Saga	Kenji Mizoguchi	Raizo Ichikawa, Tamao Nakamura	Drama	
A Spring of Happiness	Masanori Kakei	Ineko Arima, Jun Negami, Mieko Takamine	—	
Tomorrow's Happiness	Shunkai Mizuho	Ken Uehara, Hiroshi Koizumi, Yoshiko Kuga	—	
Yancha musume gyojoki	Kunio Watanabe	Kyoko Aoyama, Kenichi "Enoken" Enomoto, Kingoro Yanagiya	—	
Yokihi	Kenji Mizoguchi	Machiko Kyō, Masayuki Mori	Drama	
Yuki no hono	Jin Usami	Yoko Tsukasa, So Yamamura, Akira Takarada	—	

== See also ==
- 1955 in Japan
