= The Day the Sky Exploded =

1958 film

- Italian film poster for The Day the Sky Exploded
- Directed by: Paolo Heusch; Mario Bava
- Screenplay by: Marcello Coscia; Alessandro Continenza
- Story by: Virgilio Sabel
- Produced by: Guido Giambartolomei
- Starring: Paul Hubschmid; Madeleine Fischer; Fiorella Mari; Ivo Garrani
- Cinematography: Mario Bava
- Edited by: Otello Colangeli
- Music by: Carlo Rustichelli
- Production companies: Royal Film; Lux Film; Lux Compagnie Cinématographique de France
- Release dates: September 4, 1958 (Italy); July 15, 1959 (France)
- Running time: 82 minutes
- Countries: Italy; France

The Day the Sky Exploded (Italian: La morte viene dallo spazio, lit. 'Death Comes From Space'), released in the United Kingdom as Death Comes From Outer Space, is a 1958 science fiction film. The film was an international co-production between Italy and France with Royal Film, Lux Film and Lux Compagnie Cinématographique.

It is known as the first Italian science fiction film, predating even the science fiction films of Antonio Margheriti.

== Plot ==
From Cape Shark in the Australian desert, the United Nations launches an atomic rocket on a crewed Moon mission, but one of the engines malfunctions. The American pilot, John MacLaren, disengages the escape capsule and returns to Earth. However, the atomic booster continues, eventually exploding in the Delta asteroid cluster. When MacLaren insists on staying at Cape Shark to help, his homesick wife Mary takes their son and leaves for the U.S. without him.

Engineer Peter Leduq, a boastful ladies' man, bets that he can "thaw frigid co-worker Katie Dandridge with a kiss within six days", unaware she can hear him over the intercom. She rebuffs his initial efforts but allows him to kiss her while they are working an all-nighter to calculate the results of the rocket's explosion. When she belatedly remembers his amorousness is motivated by a bet, she is heartbroken, not realizing he has developed genuine feelings for her.

The rocket explosion dislodges the asteroids from their orbits. They merge into one giant cluster heading for Earth. To make matters worse, scientists find that the cluster will pass the Moon, causing tidal effects which will flood coastal regions. As the cluster approaches, it causes worldwide disasters: tidal waves, wind, firestorms, and earthquakes. Mass evacuations lead to panic and riots.

While searching for a solution, Dandridge cracks under pressure, and Leduq takes over her shift for her, exposing his sensitive and supportive side to her. At the eleventh hour, MacLaren comes up with the idea of arming every missile on Earth with a nuclear warhead and firing them all at the cluster. Due to the climate change wrought by the cluster, Cape Shark's air conditioning must remain at maximum power to keep the temperature low enough for the base's calculator to determine all the firing data. MacLaren is reunited with his family. Mary explains that they were waiting until the last minute to board the plane in hopes that he would join them, and so they heard the announcement of the asteroid disaster and headed back to Cape Shark.

Scientist Dr. Randowsky becomes convinced that the chaos caused by the cluster is divine punishment for humanity's use of nuclear missiles. He disables the air conditioning unit, thus rendering the calculator inoperative, and uses a gun to hold off anyone who approaches to restore it. MacLaren, Leduq, and MacLaren's friend Herbert Weisser rush Randowsky, and Weisser is fatally shot. Randowsky runs out of ammunition and accidentally electrocutes himself while fleeing from MacLaren and Leduq. The calculator is restarted, and the last of the firing data is transmitted. The missiles are launched, destroying the cluster and saving Earth.

== Cast ==
- Paul Hubschmid as John MacLaren
- Fiorella Mari as Mary MacLaren
- Ivo Garrani as Herbert Weisser
- Madeleine Fischer as Katie Dandridge
- Dario Michaëlis as Peter Leduq
- Sam Galter as Dr. Randowsky
- Jean-Jacques Delbo as Sergei Boetnikov

== Production ==
=== Background and pre-production ===
Prior to the release of The Day the Sky Exploded, there had been no Italian science fiction films. Some earlier films such as Mario Mattoli's comedy 1,000 chilometri al minuto feature scientists involved in space research, but that aspect had little relevance to the plot. Some earlier American science fiction films such as Invaders From Mars were only released in 1957 in Italy and received considerable financial success.

Development on The Day the Sky Exploded began in early 1958. It is unknown whose idea it was to develop a science fiction film. The credited director of the film is Paolo Heusch, who had made his directorial debut with L'uomo facile, which premiered that same year. Among the cast was Swiss actor Paul Hubschmid, who played the main character in The Beast from 20,000 Fathoms (1953) under the name Paul Christian. Giacomo Rossi-Stuart also appeared in the film; it was his first of several roles for Bava.

=== Filming ===
According to cast member Ivo Garrani, The Day the Sky Exploded was "completely directed by Bava. Really, Paulo Heusch didn't do very much on the set." This was also corroborated by production assistant Armando Govoni who stated Black Sunday was "not Bava's first film, he had already directed a picture for Paolo Heusch."

Bava was not only the cameraman and special effects designer on the film, but was also responsible for manipulating the newsreel footage to tell the film's story. Bava biographer Tim Lucas said that nearly 60% of the film consists of stock footage documenting dozens of unrelated events. Among the special effects Bava created for the film include a number of glass shots using clips from magazines, such as one in Moscow using a clip of a Minaret from National Geographic and the "Mt. Hula" telescope taken from Popular Science. To film the large sphere surrounded by a halo in the skies over the city, Bava projected slides of world landmarks onto an opaque silk screen with a brute light behind it. Lucas commented that the object appeared to be "a large sponge with chunks torn out". The shot was then overlaid with multiple exposures which Bava took with his father's Mitchell camera, wound the footage back and shot numerous additional exposures with backyard and home made rocket models.

=== Music ===
The film score was made by Carlo Rustichelli. Rustichelli reported directly to Bava while developing the score to the fim, with Rustichelli explaining that "Generally it was the director who chose the composer, in agreement with the music publishers and sometimes with the producer or the screenwriter." The film score was created using acoustic and electronic instruments and non-musical devices. The composer explained that he "went into the recording studio with a fire extinguisher, a blender and a vacuum cleaner, to do those special sound effects." Rustichelli commented that "It was difficult to create a new sound for this particular genre; you must remember that this was very crude science fiction; it wasn't 2001 or a Star Wars." Rustichelli would work with Bava again on The Whip and the Body and Blood and Black Lace.

== Release ==
The Day the Sky Exploded was released in Italy on September 4, 1958. It grossed less than 150 million Italian lire domestically. It was released in France as Le Danger vient de l'Espace the following year by Lux Cinematographique on July 15, 1959.

It premiered in the United States on September 27, 1961 in Los Angeles. The film was distributed by Excelsior Pictures in the United States, a small distributor that did not have any financial success with their few previous releases. The Day the Sky Exploded was released on VHS and Betamax in the United States by Sinister Cinema and on DVD by Alpha Video.

== Reception ==
In a contemporary review, the Monthly Film Bulletin stated that "The producers of this Franco-Italian science fiction film have turned to stock footage to such an extent that this might well be termed the stock-shot film par excellence." and that "this disparate material has been quite ingeniously assembled". They concluded that the film was "otherwise routine" and "tamely directed".

TV Guide gave the film a one out of four rating, referring to it as an "Ineffective sci-fi outing". In Phil Hardy's book Science Fiction (1984), a review stated that "the picture's main asset is Bava's excellent cinematography; both acting and direction fail to transcend a poor script."

== See also ==
- List of French films of 1958
- List of science fiction films of the 1950s
- List of Italian films of 1958

== Notes ==
=== References ===
- Hardy, Phil, ed. (1984). Science Fiction. New York : Morrow. ISBN 0-688-00842-9.
- Lucas, Tim (2013). Mario Bava - All the Colors of the Dark. ISBN 978-0-9633756-1-2.
