= Francisco Elías =

Spanish film producer and director

Francisco Elías Riquelme (26 June 1890–8 June 1977) was a Spanish film producer and film director. He released the first sound film of Spanish cinema, El misterio de la Puerta del Sol, or The Mystery of Puerta del Sol (1928), which cost 18,000 pesetas at the time.

Francisco Elías Riquelme was born in Huelva, Spain.

== Career ==
Elías' earliest position was in Paris as an editor and printer of silent film title cards. He later relocated to Barcelona and shot his first film in 1914, Los Oficios de Rafael Arcos, or, The Jobs of Rafael Arcos. During World War I he traveled to the United States, where he created Elijah Press Inc., a producer of multilingual title cards. With the decline of silent films, he decided to return to Spain, where he made his debut as director with the silent film, El fabricante de suicidos, or The Suicide Fabricator (1928), and the sound film The Mystery of Puerta del Sol.

The failure of his films forced him to return to Paris, where he made three French films for French production companies. When he once again returned to Spain, he joined the studio Orphea Barcelona, the first to shoot sound films made in Spain. There he created films like Pax (1932), Rataplán (1935), and Maria de la O (1936). During the Spanish Civil War he was in charge of cinematography for the Generalitat (the then-recently created governing body of Republican revolutionaries after the overthrow of Spain's military dictator, which was later incorporated into the Popular Front during the Spanish Civil War), for whom he released Bohemians (1937) and No quiero! No quiero! (1938). After the Spanish Civil War broke out, he went into exile in Mexico, where he released eight films.

In 1953 he returned to Spain to produce and direct Marta, the failure of which drove him away completely away from film direction, and years later, production. In 1994 was he was honored at the Latin American Film Festival of Huelva.

He died on June 8, 1977, in Barcelona.
