= Ernesto Vilches =

Spanish actor, director and screenwriter

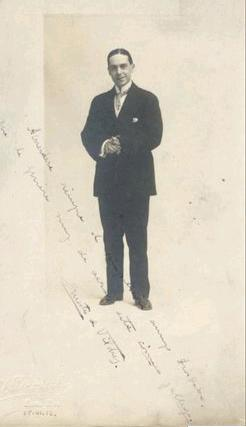
Ernesto Vilches's Portrait

Ernesto Vilches (February 6, 1879 in Tarragona – December 8, 1954 in Barcelona) was a Spanish film actor, director and screenwriter, known for his roles in Latin films, mainly in Argentina and Mexico. He first came to the attention of cinema goers in Spain with his role in José de Togores's 1917 silent film El golfo, which he also wrote the screenplay for. He starred in the acclaimed Silver Condor-winning 1943 film Juvenilia.

== Selected filmography ==
- Seven Women (1944)
- The House is Empty (1945)
- Lola Casanova (1949)
- Dawn of America (1951)
- Under the Sky of Spain (1953)
- Marta (1955)
