= Max Croci =

Italian film director (1968–2018)

- Born: 11 October 1968; Busto Arsizio, Italy
- Died: 8 November 2018 (aged 50); Milan, Italy
- Occupation: Director
- Website: www.maxcroci.com

Max Croci (11 October 1968 – 8 November 2018) was an Italian director.

== Biography ==
Croci began his career in 1995 by making short films. In the early 2000s, he worked for Sky Italia and directed shows such as L'arte dei titoli di testa, Il cinema di carta, and the first season of Una poltrona per due, a comedy starring Alessia Ventura. After several years of producing short documentaries and television series, Croci directed his first feature film, Poli opposti.

== Filmography ==
- Poli opposti (2015)
- Al posto tuo (2016)
- La verità, vi spiego, sull'amore (2017)
