= Marta (1955 film) =

1955 film

- Directed by: Francisco Elías
- Written by: Francisco Elías
- Starring: Mario Cabré; Elisa Montés; Ernesto Vilches
- Cinematography: Mariano Ruiz Capillas
- Production company: Producciones Cinematográficas Amílcar
- Distributed by: Viñals Distribución
- Release date: 4 July 1955
- Running time: 102 minutes
- Country: Spain
- Language: Spanish

Marta is a 1955 Spanish drama film directed by Francisco Elías and starring Mario Cabré, Elisa Montés and Ernesto Vilches. It was the last film of Francisco Elías, who had returned from exile in Mexico, and proved a failure at the box office.

== Cast ==
- Mario Cabré as Rafael
- Pilar Rivol as Marta
- Elisa Montés as Gloria
- Ernesto Vilches as Don Rufino
- Félix de Pomés Don Gustavo
- Germán Cobos
- Marilín Estrada
- Luis Induni
- Ángel Jordán Urrutia
- Diana Mayer

== Bibliography ==
- Comas, Àngel. Diccionari de llargmetratges: el cinema a Catalunya durant la Segona República, la Guerra Civil i el franquisme (1930-1975). Cossetània Edicions, 2005.
- Bentley, Bernard. A Companion to Spanish Cinema. Boydell & Brewer 2008.
