= Madeleine Fischer =

Swiss actress (1935–2020)

- Fischer in 1957
- Born: 12 November 1935; Romanshorn, Switzerland
- Died: 8 April 2020 (aged 84); Gubbio, Italy
- Occupation: Actress

Madeleine Fischer (12 November 1935 – 8 April 2020) was a Swiss actress who was active in the cinema of Italy.

== Biography ==
Fischer was the daughter of an industrialist and a teacher. She spent her childhood at her home in Romanshorn, in the Canton of Thurgau. After her parents divorced in the early 1950s, Fischer went with her mother to Rome.

Fischer first appeared in front of a camera in 1953, when she was 18 years old. Her first major role was Rosetta Savoni in Michelangelo Antonioni's film Le Amiche. She played numerous other roles in Italian cinema, but she was never heavily interested in acting.

In 1958, she quit acting and married a local nobleman. She worked as a photographer and a businesswoman. In the 1960s, she opened fashion stores such as Piper Market and Piperino. She began to expand her commercial activities and traveled to Milan and New York City with her husband.

Fischer retired from fashion in the 1970s and settled in Umbria. She became involved in several artistic fields, such as the restoration of old objects. In the 2000s, she wrote several manuscripts, which remained unpublished. In 2004, Fischer directed Uròboro, a post-modern version of Little Red Riding Hood in the form of a comic opera.

Madeleine Fischer died on 8 April 2020 in Gubbio at the age of 84.

== Filmography ==
=== Actress ===
- We, the Women (1953) as Madeleine (segment "Concorso 4 Attrici 1 Speranza")
- Le Amiche (1955) as Rosetta Savoni
- I pappagalli (1955) as Liliana
- The Bachelor (1955) as Carla Alberini
- La gran mentira (1956) as Teresa Campos
- Classe di ferro (1957) as Isabella Martelli
- Lazzarella (1957) as Brigitte
- The Day the Sky Exploded (1958) as Katy Dandridge
- Te doy mi vida (1958)
- L'ultima canzone (1960) as Rosaria (final film role)

=== Director ===
- Uròboro
