= The Bachelor (1955 film) =

1955 Italian film by Antonio Pietrangeli

- Directed by: Antonio Pietrangeli
- Starring: Alberto Sordi; Nino Manfredi; Fernando Fernán Gómez; Virna Lisi (uncredited)
- Cinematography: Gianni Di Venanzo
- Edited by: Eraldo Da Roma
- Music by: Angelo Francesco Lavagnino
- Release date: 1955
- Running time: 89 minutes
- Countries: Italy; Spain
- Language: Italian

The Bachelor (Italian: Lo scapolo) is a 1955 film directed by Antonio Pietrangeli, starring Alberto Sordi and Nino Manfredi. It was shown as part of a retrospective on Italian comedy at the 67th Venice International Film Festival.

== Plot ==
Accountant Paolo Anselmi is a confirmed bachelor who finds himself having to be the best man for a friend's business partner. Paolo leaves his old apartment to his friend and new wife and moves to a small guesthouse. Here, he meets a woman, young hostess Gabriella. The relationship between the two begins to get serious, but he does not want to make a commitment. Then the woman moves to another city. Paolo regains his freedom, but loneliness grips him. He now finds the company of other bachelors boring. His mother continues to insist on him getting married. The bachelor is convinced and begins to seek a wife. Among the "candidates", many have insurmountable defects, such as jealousy, family or physique. Finally he is convinced that Carla Alberini is right for him, and she becomes his companion, despite their initial meetings having always ended in furious fights.

== Cast ==
- Alberto Sordi - Paolo Anselmi
- Sandra Milo - Gabriella, hostess
- Nino Manfredi - Peppino
- Madeleine Fischer - Carla Alberini
- Anna Maria Pancani - Lisa
- María Asquerino - Catina
- Fernando Fernán Gómez - Armando
- Pina Bottin - Anna, laundry's director
- Attilio Martella - Michele
- Giovanni Cimara - Mario
- Franca Mazzoni - Norma
- Alberto De Amicis - Antonio
- Francesco Mulé - Cosimo
- Antonella De Luca - Vanda
- Lilli Panicalli - Claudia
