= Le Amiche =

1955 Italian film

Le amiche
- Theatrical release poster
- Directed by: Michelangelo Antonioni
- Written by: Michelangelo Antonioni; Suso Cecchi d'Amico; Alba de Céspedes
- Based on: Tra donne sole by Cesare Pavese
- Produced by: Giovanni Addessi
- Starring: Eleonora Rossi Drago; Gabriele Ferzetti; Franco Fabrizi; Valentina Cortese; Anna Marie Pancani; Madeleine Fischer
- Cinematography: Gianni Di Venanzo
- Edited by: Eraldo Da Roma
- Music by: Giovanni Fusco
- Production company: Trionfalcine
- Distributed by: Titanus
- Release date: 7 September 1955 (Italy)
- Running time: 104 minutes (Note: Running time according to the Criterion Collection Blu-ray release of the film's restored 2008 version)
- Country: Italy
- Language: Italian

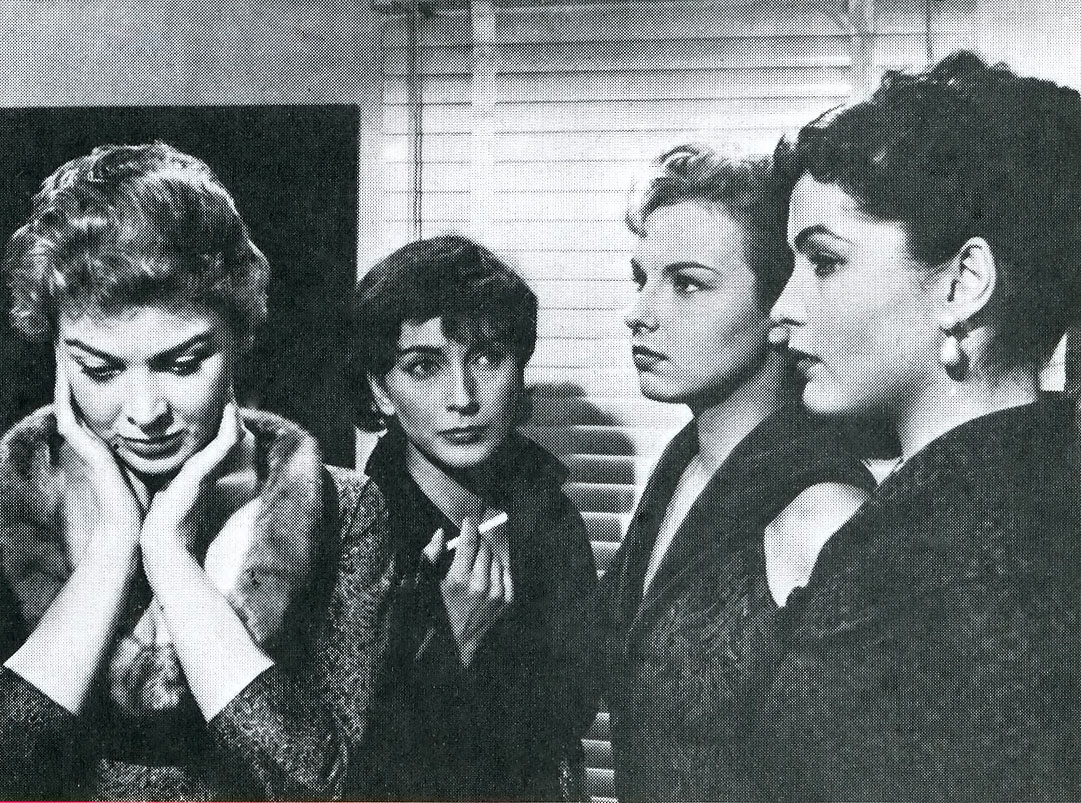
Image still from Le Amiche. Friends confront the suicide attempt of their friend.

Le amiche (Italian: [le aˈmiːke], lit. "The girlfriends") is a 1955 Italian drama film directed by Michelangelo Antonioni and starring Madeleine Fischer, Eleonora Rossi Drago, Gabriele Ferzetti, Franco Fabrizi, and Valentina Cortese. Based on Cesare Pavese's 1949 novella Tra donne sole (lit. "Among women only" or "Among single women"), Le amiche portrays a group of five upper-class women in Turin and their various relationships with men. It premiered at the 16th Venice International Film Festival, where it was awarded the Silver Lion.

== Plot ==
Clelia returns from Rome to her native city Turin, assigned to supervise the opening of a branch of the Roman fashion salon where she previously has been working. By coincidence, she is confronted with the suicide attempt of a young woman named Rosetta who is in the next door apartment. As Rosetta recovers Clelia befriends her clique of Turin socialite friends.The group includes the coquettish Mariella; Momina, who lives separated from her husband and has changing affairs; and successful ceramics artist Nene, who lives with Lorenzo, an unrecognised painter. The construction work on the salon, whose opening lies only a few days ahead, is not finished yet, for which Clelia scolds Cesare, the architect in charge, who turns out to be Momina's present affair. During her inspection, Clelia also meets Cesare's assistant Carlo. Although she feels attracted to him, she is soon confronted with the social boundaries between Carlo, who is of working class descent, and herself, regardless of the fact that Clelia grew up in one of Turin's poor quarters as well.

After Rosetta's return from the hospital, the five women, Cesare and Lorenzo take a trip to the beach. It becomes evident that Rosetta has fallen in love with Nene's partner Lorenzo, for whom she modeled and whom she had tried to ring up on the night of her suicide attempt. Rosetta tells Clelia of her inner emptiness and that she loathes the predictability which surrounds her. Clelia offers Rosetta a job at the salon as a means to find a different perspective on her life.

Rosetta tries to talk Lorenzo into leaving Nene for her, but Lorenzo remains hesitant. Eager to spend every moment possible with her lover, she decides against the opportunity to work at Clelia's salon. During the opening event, Nene, who has sensed the attraction between Rosetta and Lorenzo, preemptively tells Rosetta that she will give him up to her. When the group later meets in a restaurant, Cesare congratulates Nene on a famous art dealer's offer to take her pottery to an important exhibition in New York City. Taken aback that Nene has not mentioned this, Lorenzo becomes angry and bitter and the 2 men get into a brawl and Lorenzo is forced to leave. Rosetta follows Lorenzo, who tells her that he cannot give her the love she seeks from him. Lorenzo returns to Nene, who eventually accepts him back, even if it means giving up the chance to go to New York for the exhibition

Soon after, Rosetta drowns herself in the Po river. (Note: This is a departure from Pavese's plot, in which Rosetta, alone, takes an overdose of pills.) Disgusted by Momina's self-righteousness in the face of her friend's death, Clelia attacks her for her coldness and cynism in front of the salon customers and her employer. Convinced that she will lose her job, Clelia hints at Carlo the possibility of a relationship, but when her employer offers her to return to the salon in Rome, she chooses her professional career and independence over the prospect of becoming, in her words, "a peaceful wife in a modest home". She asks him to meet her one last time, but Carlo does not show up, instead secretly watching her departure on the train to Rome.

== Cast ==
- Eleonora Rossi Drago as Clelia
- Gabriele Ferzetti as Lorenzo
- Franco Fabrizi as Cesare
- Valentina Cortese as Nene
- Yvonne Furneaux as Momina
- Madeleine Fischer as Rosetta
- Anna Marie Pancani as Mariella
- Luciano Volpato as Tony
- Maria Gambarelli as Clelia's employer
- Ettore Manni as Carlo

== Production and release ==
Antonioni adapted the screenplay from Pavese's novella in collaboration with Suso Cecchi d'Amico and Alba de Céspedes, assigning the dramaturgy to d'Amico and the dialogue to Céspedes. Alterations from the literary source include the narrative perspective, which is solely Clelia's in the novella, other than the film's multiple viewpoints, and the motive of Rosetta's suicide, which is ascribed to a luckless lesbian affair with Momina and a general feeling of senselessness in Pavese's book, while the ill-fated affair with Lorenzo serves as explanation in the adaptation. The film was shot on location in Turin, produced by the Trionfalcine production company, Rome. The women's wardrobe was designed by the Roman fashion house Sorelle Fontana.

Le amiche premiered at the 16th Venice International Film Festival on 7 September 1955 and was distributed in Italy through Titanus. The film did respectably well at the box office; two years later, it premiered in Paris with critical support by Positif magazine. In the US, it was not shown before Antonioni had established himself as a filmmaker of international prominence with L'avventura (1960).

On the film's initial run, some critics, such as novelist Alberto Moravia, commented on Antonioni's approach to his material as being restrained. Nowadays, the majority of critics regard Le amiche as an important early work by the director, which foreshadows themes again explored in his later films, in L'avventura in particular, such as the lack of emotional connection between the protagonists and the emptiness within them.

== Awards ==
- 1955: Venice International Film Festival – Silver Lion
- 1956: Italian National Syndicate of Film Journalists – Silver Ribbon Award for Best Director (Michelangelo Antonioni)
- 1956: Italian National Syndicate of Film Journalists – Silver Ribbon Award for Best Supporting Actress (Valentina Cortese)

== See also ==
- Michelangelo Antonioni filmography
