= Death of a Cyclist =

1955 film by Juan Antonio Bardem

- Spanish theatrical release poster
- Directed by: Juan Antonio Bardem
- Screenplay by: Juan Antonio Bardem
- Story by: Luis Fernando de Igoa
- Produced by: Manuel Goyanes
- Starring: Lucia Bosè; Alberto Closas
- Cinematography: Alfredo Fraile
- Edited by: Margarita de Ochoa
- Music by: Isidro B. Maiztegui
- Production companies: Guión Producciones Cinematográficas; Suevia Films; Trionfalcine
- Distributed by: Suevia Films (Spain); Trionfalcine (Italy)
- Release dates: 9 May 1955 (Cannes Film Festival); 9 September 1955 (Spain)
- Running time: 88 minutes
- Countries: Spain; Italy
- Language: Spanish

Death of a Cyclist (Spanish: Muerte de un ciclista; first released in the United States as Age of Infidelity) is a 1955 social realist Spanish drama film directed by Juan Antonio Bardem and starring Italian actress Lucia Bosè (who was dubbed into Spanish by Elsa Fábregas) and Alberto Closas. It won the FIPRESCI Award at the 1955 Cannes Film Festival.

== Plot ==
As reunited childhood sweethearts María Jose de Castro, now a wealthy married woman, and Juan Fernandez Soler, now an adjunct professor of analytic geometry who only got his job due to the influence of his powerful brother-in-law, are speeding down the road after an adulterous rendezvous, she hits a bicyclist with her car. Although a concerned Juan rushes over to the man and notes that he is still alive, María José encourages Juan to get back in the car and leave with her. Juan is troubled by the incident, especially after he reads the cyclist died of his injuries, and begins to reflect on his past, including his time as a former falange soldier, and the hypocrisy of his upper-class life. María José, however, is primarily concerned that the exposure of the crime—and her affair—could mean the loss of her comfortable life as a socialite. Her paranoia increases when Rafa, an art critic who is only part of her social circle to add some culture and play piano at parties, begins to drop hints that he knows a secret about her.

There are no reported witnesses to the accident, and María José is relieved to find that Rafa does not know anything about it, either, when the secret he reveals to María José's husband, Miguel, is about her affair. Miguel says he does not believe Rafa, but he begins to behave suspiciously, and—unusually—insists that María José accompany him on an upcoming business trip. Meanwhile, Juan, inspired by a visit to the dead cyclist's tenement and the solidarity shown by a student demonstration in support of a student he unjustly gave a failing grade, decides to quit his job and turn himself in. He invites María José to go to the police with him, so they can purify themselves and start a new life together without any secrets once they get out of jail. She agrees to his plan, but, when they stop at the site of the accident, María José runs Juan over and drives away.

Distraught, and in a hurry to get home in time to leave on the trip with Miguel, María José sees a cyclist appear out of the dark and swerves to avoid him. She drives off a bridge, and falls to her death. The cyclist, after pausing for a moment to consider his options, sees the lights of a nearby house and rides to get help.

== Cast ==
- Lucia Bosè as María José de Castro (dubbed into Spanish by Elsa Fábregas)
- Alberto Closas as Juan Fernandez Soler
- Bruna Corra as Matilde Luque Carvajal, a student
- Carlos Casaravilla as Rafael "Rafa" Sandoval, an art critic
- Otello Toso as Miguel Castro, María José's husband
- Alicia Romay as Carmina, Juan's sister
- Julia Delgado Caro as Doña Maria, Juan's mother
- Matilde Muñoz Sampedro (director Bardem's mother) as the bicyclist's neighbor
- Mercedes Albert as Cristina, a socialite
- José Sepúlveda as a law enforcement official at the student demonstration
- José Prada as a university official
- Fernando Sancho as a motorcycle officer
- Manuel Alexandre as the bicyclist at the end
- Emilio Alonso as Jorge, Carmina's powerful husband
- Margarita Espinosa as Encarna, proprietress of the gas station/motel where Juan and María José meet
- Antonio Casas as Juan's friend, a track and field coach
- Valeriano Andrés as a motorcycle officer (uncredited)

== Reception ==
=== Critical analysis ===
Film critic Robert Koehler wrote of the director's goals when shooting the film: "With the economy of Tourneur and Walsh, Bardem immediately establishes in the opening frames of Death of a Cyclist not only the incident to which the title refers, but also, more crucially, that lovers Juan (Alberto Closas) and María José (Lucia Bosé) are doomed... The Rafa-María José-Miguel interplay is sprinkled with irony, sarcasm, and suggestion, and comes to a boil with the help of social satire, revenge, paranoia, and suspicion. It's quite a soup, and Bardem has fun dipping into it. Contrary to the film's reputation as a stark rebuke of Franco-era hypocrisy and corruption, Death of a Cyclist is perhaps most surprising and memorable for this half-terrifying, half-comical roundelay of three people caught in a web of misunderstanding (María José mistakenly convinced that Rafa witnessed something of the bicycle accident) and distrust (each of them for the other).

Film critic Mark Mesaros discussed the stylistic aspects of the film, writing: "Death of a Cyclist is a polemical tale that borrows the grammar of the Hitchcockian murder mystery as well as the forbidden romance of film noir to achieve its ideologic ends... Beginning with the techniques that are most efficacious, it's necessary to emphasize Bardem's brilliant use of cuts and dissolves throughout. What will be remembered most by viewers is the way the film jump cuts effortlessly between the seemingly primary melodrama and scenes of so-called 'social realism'. At first the cuts are employed between bourgeois and working class milieus, but later more abstract associations will be made. It's apparent that our pair of privileged sinners lie totally outside of 'social reality': when their sports-car hits the cyclist we do not see his twisted frame, only the twisted frame of the bicycle, and the reactions of Juan and María José. Through the course of events Juan will be forced to interlope within the reality of the cyclist and his family, while María José will be further ensconced in the delicate net of her delusion."

=== American reviews ===
Bosley Crowther of The New York Times panned the film and its style, writing: "Aside from the fact that Señor Bardem has not chosen an especially novel theme or given his treatment of it any new or surprising twist, he has actually confused it with weird plotting and a wild, choppy cinematic style. Señor Bardem's cinematic syntax has no capitals or punctuation marks. He jumps from one scene to another without terminal notifications or dissolves. You have to be awfully attentive to figure out where you are...Maybe they have cut this Pathé picture, and the English subtitles are poor. But Señor Bardem will have to do better to make his laurels look deserved."

Geoffrey Warren of the Los Angeles Times gave the film a generally favorable review, saying that it "at times comes close to a good, sound tragedy but has to settle for a rating of excellent melodrama." It played at various theaters in the L.A. area into early 1959.

=== Awards ===
- Winner: Cannes Film Festival FIPRESCI Prize (Juan Antonio Bardem), 1955
- Winner: Circulo de Escritores Cinematográficos Photography Award (Alfredo Fraile), 1955

== Home media ==
The film was released on DVD in the United States by The Criterion Collection. On November 26, 2022, it was shown on the Turner Classic Movies show Noir Alley, with Eddie Muller.
