= Sandra Milo =

Italian actress (1933–2024)

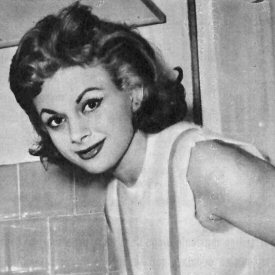
- Born: Salvatrice Elena Greco; 11 March 1933; Tunis, French Tunisia
- Died: 29 January 2024 (aged 90); Rome, Italy
- Occupations: Actress; singer; author; television personality
- Years active: 1955–2024
- Spouses: Moris Ergas; Ottavio De Lollis
- Children: 3

Salvatrice Elena Greco (11 March 1933 – 29 January 2024), known professionally as Sandra Milo, was an Italian actress, television personality, author, and musician. She won a Nastro d'Argento for Best Supporting Actress for each of her roles in Federico Fellini's 8½ and Juliet of the Spirits.

== Life and career ==
Milo made her film debut in 1955 alongside Alberto Sordi in The Bachelor. Her first major role came in 1959 thanks to the producer Moris Ergas, in General della Rovere, directed by Roberto Rossellini. She also appeared in his film Vanina Vanini, but Rossellini's career was cut short after the film received harsh criticism at the Venice Festival. After she got married, she retired from her acting career.

Until discovered by Fellini, Milo had mostly performed in comedies and melodramas. Although she was reluctant to make a comeback, Fellini convinced her to take on the role of the sexy, lightheaded mistress opposite Marcello Mastroianni in 8½. The movie, which won universal acclaim, failed to change the public perception of her and although she was cast in Juliet of the Spirits, most of her following endeavors were second-rate films.

In the mid-1960s, Milo was hostess of a television program in Rome.

Milo retired again from acting in 1968, only to make a second comeback in 1979, with her roles shifting from that of the temptress to more stern middle-aged women. In 2006–2007 she toured Italy with the theatrical adaptation of 8 Women.

Milo married Moris Ergas with whom she had a daughter Deborah, and later married Ottavio De Lollis with whom she had two children, Ciro and Azzurra. She was Roman Catholic. Milo died from lung cancer on 29 January 2024, at the age of 90.

== Discography ==
=== Singles ===
List of singles, with selected chart positions and certifications
Title	Year	Peak chart positions	Certifications	Album
Title	Year	ITA	Certifications	Album
"Come si fa/Il mondo è tutto una canzone"	1984	—		Non-album single
"Il ballo del che cos'è"	1987	—		Non-album single
"Ma si che ce la fai/Marinai Marinai" (with Gianni Dei)	1989	—		Non-album single
"La fotogenia" (with Alessandro Orlando Graziano)	2018	—		Voyages Extraordinaires

== Filmography ==
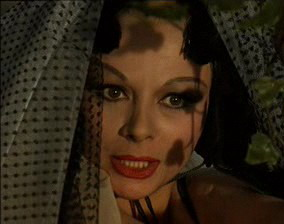
Milo in Juliet of the Spirits (1965)

=== Films ===
Film roles showing year released, title, role played and notes
Title	Year	Role	Notes
The Bachelor	1955	Gabriella	Feature film debut
Elena and Her Men	1956	Young woman	Cameo appearance
Nero's Weekend	1956	Unknown	Uncredited
Wives and Obscurities	1956	Silvana	
The Adventures of Arsène Lupin	1957	Mathilde Duchamp	
La donna che venne dal mare	1957	Danae Niebel	
Le Miroir à deux faces	1958	Ariane	
Toto in the Moon	1958	Tatiana	
Herod the Great	1959	Sarah	
Vite perdute	1959	Giulia	
Witness in the City	1959	Liliane	
Way of Youth	1959	Olga	
General Della Rovere	1959	Olga, la poule	
The Green Mare	1959	Marguerite Maloret	
Classe Tous Risques	1960	Liliane	
Adua and Her Friends	1960	Lolita	Nominated – Nastro d'Argento for the Best Supporting Actress
Gli scontenti	1961	Countess Luce	
Ghosts of Rome	1961	Flora Di Roviano	
Vanina Vanini	1961	Vanina Vanini	
The Shortest Day	1962	Heiress	Cameo appearance
8½	1963	Carla	Winner – Academy Awards for Best International Film; Winner – Academy Awards for Best Costume Design; Winner – Nastro d'Argento for the Best Supporting Actress
Méfiez-vous, mesdames	1963	Henriette	
La visita	1963	Pina	Nominated – Nastro d'Argento for the Best Lead Actress
Shivers in Summer	1963	Yvonne	
White Voices	1964	Carolina	
Amori pericolosi	1964	Generale's lover	Segment "Il Generale"
Relax Darling	1964	Helene Faustin	
Male Companion	1964	Maria	
Beautiful Families	1964	Esmeralda	
La donna è una cosa meravigliosa	1964	Rossella Minardi	Segment "Una donna dolce dolce"
Juliet of the Spirits	1965	Susy/Iris/ Fanny	Winner – Nastro d'Argento for the Best Supporting Actress
Weekend, Italian Style	1965	Giuliana Marletti	
How I Learned to Love Women	1966	Ilde	
The Strange Night	1967	Debora	
Per amore... per magia...	1967	Algisa	
Bang Bang Kid	1967	Gwenda Skaggel	
Trusting Is Good... Shooting Is Better	1968	Liz	
Ciao, Federico!	1970	Herself	Documentary film
Riavanti... Marsch!	1979	Zaira Bergamelli	
Tesoro mio	1979	Solange	
Grog	1982	Vittoria	
"FF.SS." - Cioè: "...che mi hai portato a fare sopra a Posillipo se non mi vuoi più bene?"	1983	Herself	Cameo appearance
Cinderella '80	1984	Marianne	
Remake	1987	Herself	Documentary film
Camerieri	1995	Salvatore's mistress	
Il cuore altrove	2003	Arabella	
L'ultima sequenza	2003	Herself	Documentary film
La perfezionista	2007	Herself	Cameo appearance
Chi nasce tondo...	2008	Anna Tre Culi	
Sleepless	2009	Olga's mother	
Impotenti esistenziali	2009	Aunt Elisabetta	
W Zappatore	2009	Grandma Zappatore	
Flaiano - Il meglio è passato	2010	Herself	Documentary film
Happy Family	2010	Ezio's mother	
Alta infedeltà	2010	Client	Cameo appearance
Piazza Fellini	2011	The Painter	Short film
Baci salati	2012	Countess Motta	
Impepata di nozze	2012	Michele's mother	
Una notte agli studios	2013	Sales woman	Cameo appearance
Con tutto l'amore che ho	2014	Granny	
Prima di lunedì	2016	Chanel	
The Veil of Maya	2017	Marta	
Felicissime condoglianze	2017	Grandma	
There's No Place Like Home	2018	Maria	
Un nemico che ti vuole bene	2018	Antonietta	
Le mani sulle macerie	2019	Demetria	
Eclissi	2019	Actress	Short film
Free - Liberi	2020	Mirna	
A Bookshop in Paris	2021	Madame Milo	
The Best Century of My Life	2023	Signora J.O.	Final film role

=== Television ===
Television roles showing year released, title, role played and notes
Title	Year	Role	Notes
Studio Uno	1966	Herself – Host	Italian variety show (season 4)
Piccoli fans	1984–1989	Herself – Host	Children's musical program (seasons 2–6)
Piccoli e grandi fans	1987–1989	Herself – Host	Piccoli fans spinoff
Automia	1988	Herself – Host	Variety show
L'amore è una cosa meravigliosa	1989–1990	Herself – Host	Talk show
Cari genitori	1991–1992	Herself – Host	Game show (season 4)
Buona Domenica	1995	Herself – Guest	Episode dated 23 April 1995
Il Quizzone	1995	Herself – Contestant	Game show
Ma il portiere non c'è mai?	2002	Thea Maris	Main role; 12 episodes
Ritorno al presente	2005	Herself – Contestant	Reality show
L'isola dei Famosi	2010	Herself – Contestant	Reality show (season 7)
Io e te	2019	Herself – Co-host	Talk show (season 1)
La pupa e il secchione	2020	Herself – Judge	Reality show (season 3)
Drag Race Italia	2022	Herself – Judge	Reality show (season 2); Episode: "Snatch Game! Tutto può succedere"
Quelle brave ragazze	2022–2023	Herself	Reality show
