= 1955 Cannes Film Festival =

- Official poster of the 8th Cannes Film Festival, an original illustration by Marcel Huet
- Opening film: Rififi
- Closing film: Carmen Jones
- Location: Cannes, France
- Founded: 1946
- Awards: Palme d'Or: Marty
- No. of films: 33 (In Competition)
- Festival date: 26 April 1955 – 10 May 1955
- Website: festival-cannes.com/en

Cannes Film Festival
- 1956 1954

The 8th Cannes Film Festival took place from 26 April to 10 May 1955. French writer and filmmaker Marcel Pagnol served as jury president for the main competition.

The first Palme d'Or was awarded, as the highest prize of the Festival, to Marty by Delbert Mann.

Until the 1954 Festival, the whimsical way various prizes were being awarded had drawn much criticism. In answer to this, from 1955 onwards, the Jury was composed of foreign celebrities from the film industry.

The festival opened with Rififi by Jules Dassin, and closed with Carmen Jones by Otto Preminger.

== Juries ==
=== Main Competition ===
- Marcel Pagnol, French writer and filmmaker - Jury President
- Marcel Achard, French writer
- Juan Antonio Bardem, Spanish filmmaker
- A. Dignimont, French
- Jacques-Pierre Frogerais, French
- Leopold Lindtberg, Swiss director
- Anatole Litvak, American filmmaker
- Isa Miranda, Italian actress
- Leonard Mosley, British writer
- Jean Nery, French
- Sergei Yutkevich, Soviet filmmaker

=== Short Films Competition ===
- Jacques Doniol-Valcroze, French actor
- Herman van der Horst, Dutch
- Marcel Ichac, French filmmaker
- Karl Korn, West-German
- Jean Perdrix, French filmmaker

== Official Selection ==
=== In Competition ===
The following feature films competed for the Palme d'Or:

English title	Original title	Director(s)	Production country
Bad Day at Black Rock		John Sturges	United States
Biraj Bahu		Bimal Roy	India
A Big Family	Больша́я семья́	Iosif Kheifits	Soviet Union
Black Dossier	Le Dossier noir	André Cayatte	France, Italy
Boot Polish		Prakash Arora	India
Carmen Jones (closing film)		Otto Preminger	United States
The Crucified Lovers	近松物語	Kenji Mizoguchi	Japan
The Country Girl		George Seaton	United States
Dog's Heads	Psohlavci	Martin Frič	Czechoslovakia
East of Eden		Elia Kazan	United States
The End of the Affair		Edward Dmytryk	United Kingdom, United States
Fire in the Night	Det brenner i natt!	Arne Skouen	Norway
The Gold of Naples	L'oro di Napoli	Vittorio De Sica	Italy
Heroes of Shipka	Герои Шипки	Sergei Vasilyev	Soviet Union, Bulgaria
Hill 24 Doesn't Answer	גבעה 24 אינה עונה	Thorold Dickinson	Israel
Jedda		Charles Chauvel	Australia
A Kid for Two Farthings		Carol Reed	United Kingdom
Life or Death	حياة أو موت	Kamal El Sheikh	Egypt
A Stranger on the Stairs	Un extraño en la escalera	Tulio Demicheli	Mexico
Liliomfi		Károly Makk	Hungary
Lost Continent	Continente perduto	Leonardo Bonzi, Mario Craveri, Enrico Gras, Angelo Francesco Lavagnino and Giorgio Moser	Italy
Ludwig II	Ludwig II: Glanz und Ende eines Königs	Helmut Käutner	West Germany
Marty		Delbert Mann	United States
Miracle of Marcelino	Marcelino pan y vino	Ladislao Vajda	Spain
The Mosquito	Die Mücke	Walter Reisch	West Germany
Onna no Koyomi	女の暦	Seiji Hisamatsu	Japan
Rififi (opening film)	Du rififi chez les hommes	Jules Dassin	France
Romeo and Juliet	Ромео и Джульетта	Lev Arnshtam and Leonid Lavrovsky	Soviet Union
Roots	Raíces	Benito Alazraki	Mexico
Samba Fantástico		Jean Manzon and René Persin	Brazil, France
The Princess Sen	千姫	Keigo Kimura	Japan
The Sign of Venus	Il segno di Venere	Dino Risi	Italy
Stella	Στέλλα	Michael Cacoyannis	Greece

=== Out of Competition ===
The following films were selected to be screened out of competition:

- Italia K2 by Marcello Balbi
- Les trésors de la Mer Rouge by Michel Rocca

=== Short Films Competition ===
The following short films competed for the Short Film Palme d'Or:

- 2'21"6 Butterfly Stroke: Dolphin-Kick by T. Mijata
- A esperanca e' eterna by Marcos Margulies
- Aggtelek by Ágoston Kollányi
- Arte popular Portuguesa by João Mendes
- Black on White by John Read
- Blinkity Blank by Norman McLaren
- Bow Bells by Anthony Simmons
- Bronsalder by Lars Krantz
- Bush Doctor by Jean Palardy
- Cyrk by Włodzimierz Haupe
- De sable et de feu by Jean Jabely
- Den standhaftige Tinnsoldat by Ivo Caprino
- Der Schatz des Abendlandes by Ernst Stephan Niessner, Edmund Von Hammer
- Dobreho vojak svejk by Jiri Trnka
- Dock by Emile Degelin
- Guardians of the Soil by David Millin
- Host by Thor Arnijot Udvang, Carsten Munch
- Images préhistoriques by Arcady & Thomas L. Rowe
- In cantec si dans by Ion Bostan
- Isole di fuoco by Vittorio De Seta
- Jakten over sporene by Erik Borge
- L'homme dans la lumière by René Lucot
- La ciudad blanca by Waldo Cerruto
- La grande pèche by Henri Fabiani
- Le conte de ma vie by Jørgen Roos
- Les jardiniers d'Allah by Michel Clarence
- Niedzielny poranek by Andrzej Munk
- Nos forets by Auguste Kern
- Op de spitsen by Rudi Hornecker
- Opici cisar by Jan Lacko
- Island of Sakhalin (Ostrov Sakhalin) by Vassili Katanian, Eldar Ryazanov
- Pierre Romain desfossez by Gérard De Boe
- Pulsschlag der Zeit by René Boeniger
- Symphony of Life by T.A. Abraham
- The Golden River by Pittamandalam Venktatachalapathy Pathy
- The Story of Light by Joop Geesink
- Tickets Please by Emil Nofal
- Trois coquillages de Tunisie by Roger Mauge
- When Magoo Flew by Pete Burness
- Zolotaya antilopa by Lev Atamanov

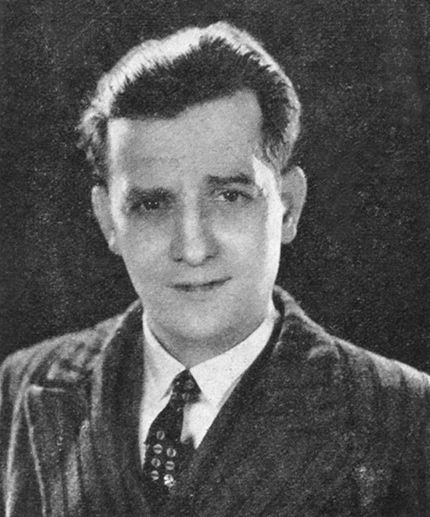
Marcel Pagnol, Jury President

== Official Awards ==
=== Main Competition ===
- Palme d'Or: Marty by Delbert Mann
- Best Director:
  - Jules Dassin for Rififi
  - Sergei Vasilyev for Heroes of Shipka
- Tribute: Hill 24 Doesn't Answer by Thorold Dickinson
- Best Acting Award:
  - Spencer Tracy for Bad Day at Black Rock
  - The entire male and female cast of A Big Family
- Jury Special Prize: Lost Continent by Leonardo Bonzi, Mario Craveri, Enrico Gras, Angelo Francesco Lavagnino and Giorgio Moser
- Best Dramatic Film: East of Eden by Elia Kazan
- Best Lyrical Film: Romeo and Juliet by Lev Arnshtam and Leonid Lavrovsky
- Distinction to two children:
  - Kumari Naaz for her performance in Boot Polish
  - Pablito Calvo for his performance in Miracle of Marcelino

=== Short Films Competition ===
- Short Film Palme d'Or: Blinkity Blank by Norman McLaren
- Special Distinction: Zolotaya Antilopa by Lev Atamanov
- Best Short Documentary: Isole di fuoco by Vittorio De Seta
- Prix du reportage filmé: La grande pêche by Henri Fabiani

== Independent Awards ==
=== FIPRESCI Prize ===
- Death of a Cyclist by Juan Antonio Bardem
- Roots by Benito Alazraki

=== OCIC Award ===
- Marty by Delbert Mann
- Special Mention: Miracle of Marcelino by Ladislao Vajda

== Media ==
- Institut National de l'Audiovisuel: Opening of the 1955 Festival (commentary in French)
- INA: Last moments of the 1955 festival (commentary in French)
