= Jury Prize (Cannes Film Festival) =

Film award

- Prix du Jury (French)
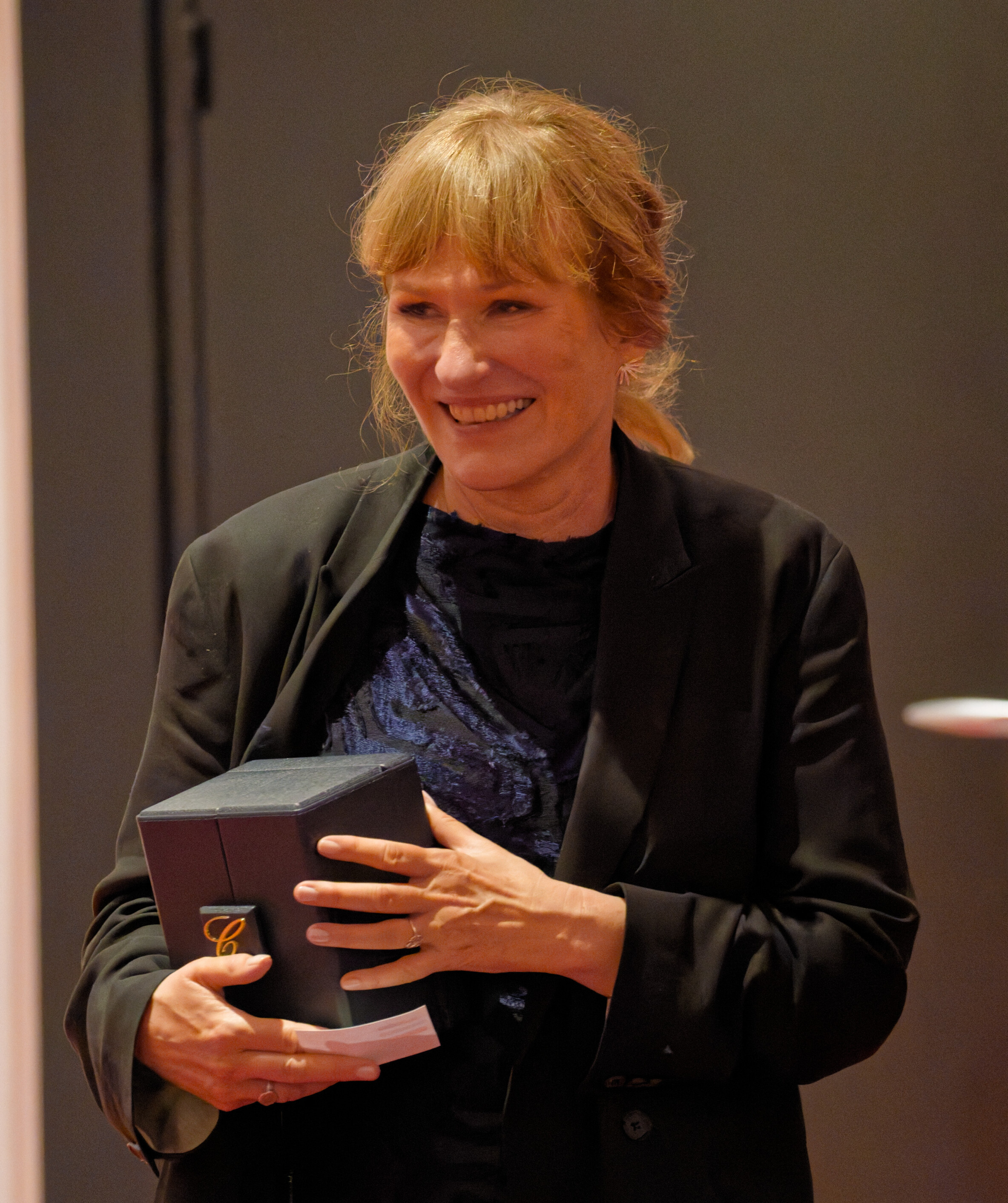
- 2026 recipient: Valeska Grisebach
- Country: France
- Presented by: Cannes Film Festival
- First award: 1946
- Currently held by: Valeska Grisebach for The Dreamed Adventure (2026)
- Website: www.festival-cannes.com/en/

The Jury Prize (French: Prix du Jury) is an award of the Cannes Film Festival bestowed by the jury of the festival on one of the competing feature films. According to American film critic Dave Kehr, the award is "intended to recognize an original work that embodies the spirit of inquiry".

Its most recent winner was the German filmmaker Valeska Grisebach for The Dreamed Adventure at the 2026 Cannes Film Festival.

== History ==
Prize official logo

The award was first presented in 1946. The prize was not awarded on 10 occasions (1947, 1949, 1953, 1967, 1974–79, 1981–82, 1984, and 2001). The festival was not held at all in 1948, 1950, and 2020. In 1968, no awards were given as the festival was called off mid-way due to the May 1968 events in France. Also, the jury vote was tied and the prize was shared by two films on 21 occasions (1957, 1960, 1962–63, 1970–71, 1973, 1987, 1991–93, 1998, 2000, 2004, 2007, 2009, 2014, 2019, 2021–22, and 2025). Ken Loach and Andrea Arnold have won the most awards in this category, each winning three. Irma P. Hall is the only actress to win in this category, for her role in The Ladykillers (2004). Four directing teams have shared the award: Enrico Gras, Giorgio Moser and Leonardo Bonzi for Lost Continent (1955), Marjane Satrapi and Vincent Paronnaud for Persepolis (2007), Kleber Mendonça Filho and Juliano Dornelles for Bacurau (2019), and Felix van Groeningen and Charlotte Vandermeersch for The Eight Mountains (2022). Samira Makhmalbaf was the first woman to have won the award, for 2000's Blackboards.

Since 1967, the official name of the award has been simply the Prix du Jury, but it has had two other names since its creation in 1946: the International Jury Prize, which was awarded for that year only, and the Prix spécial du Jury (1951–1967) that was given among other secondary prizes. In 1954, after facing much criticism about the whimsical nature of these awards, the Festival authorities decided to turn to a more traditional prize-giving arrangement. Since then, the Prix spécial du Jury reappeared only twice: Christopher Hampton won that award for Carrington along with the regular Prix du Jury given to Xavier Beauvois for Don't Forget You're Going to Die in 1995; and David Cronenberg won for Crash in 1996, which was the only prize allotted by the International Jury for that year.

British film academic Andrew M. Butler regards jury prizes such as Cannes' as a way of helping a film gain a distribution deal.

== Winners ==
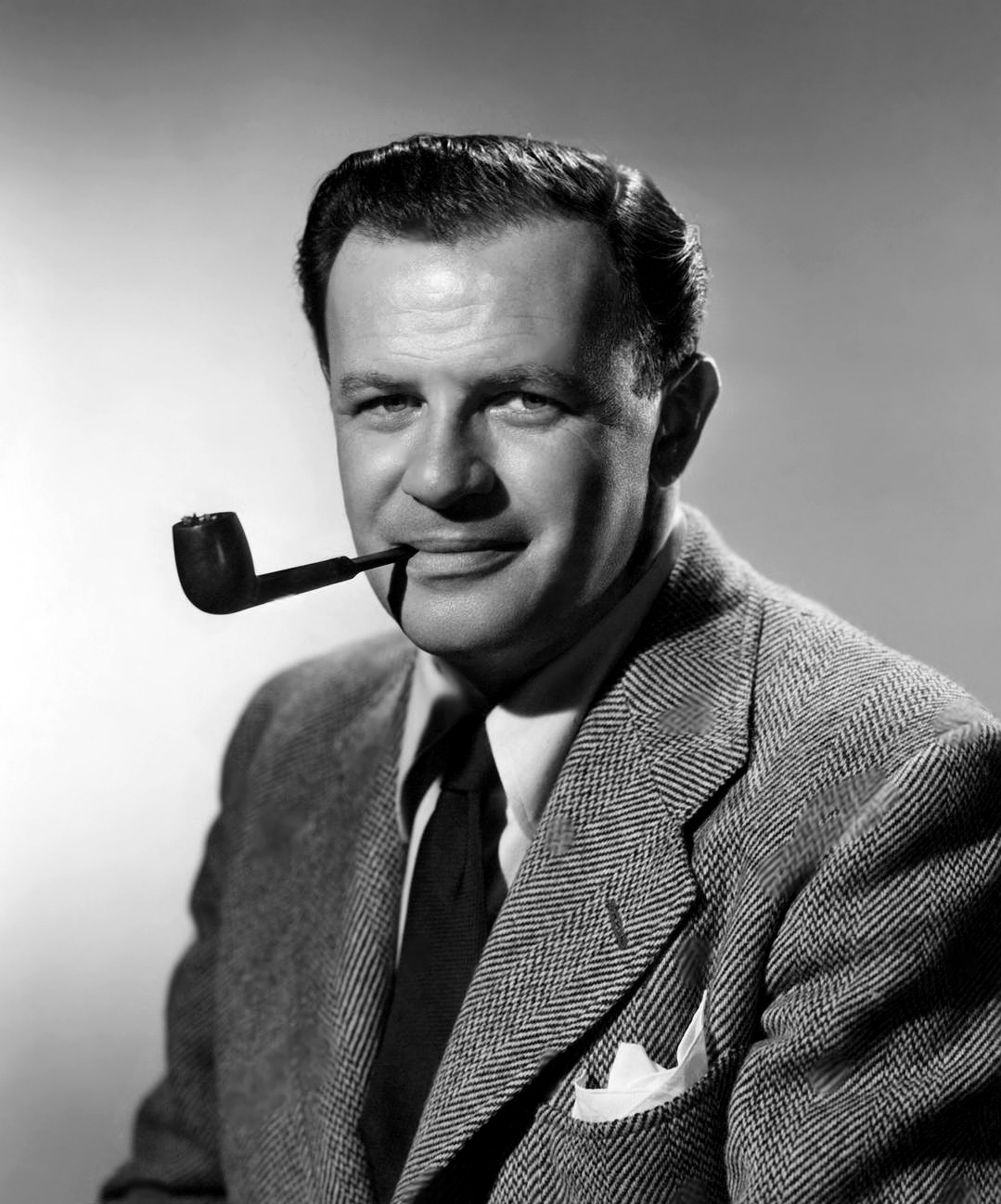
Joseph L. Mankiewicz won for All About Eve (1951)

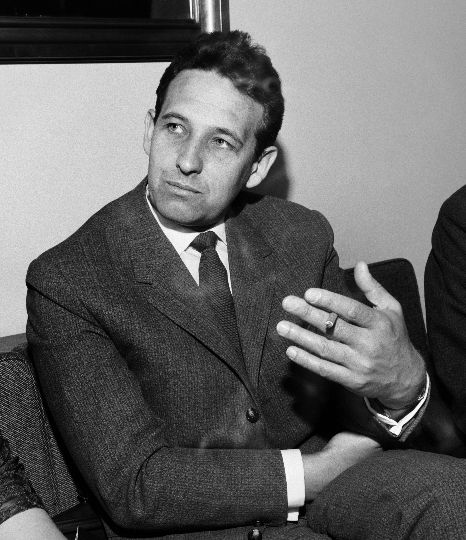
Andrzej Wajda won for Kanał (1957)

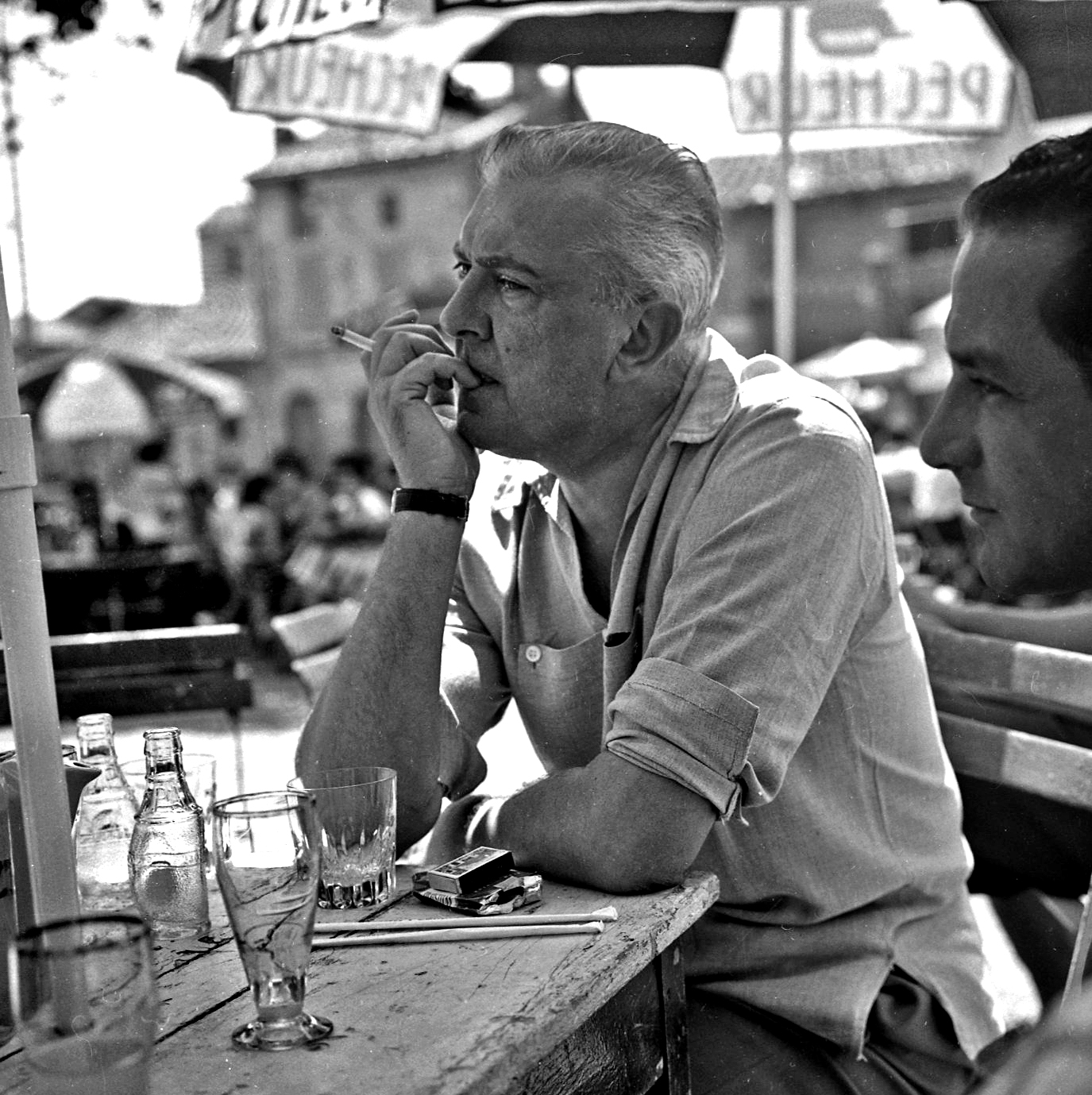
Jacques Tati won for Mon Oncle (1958)

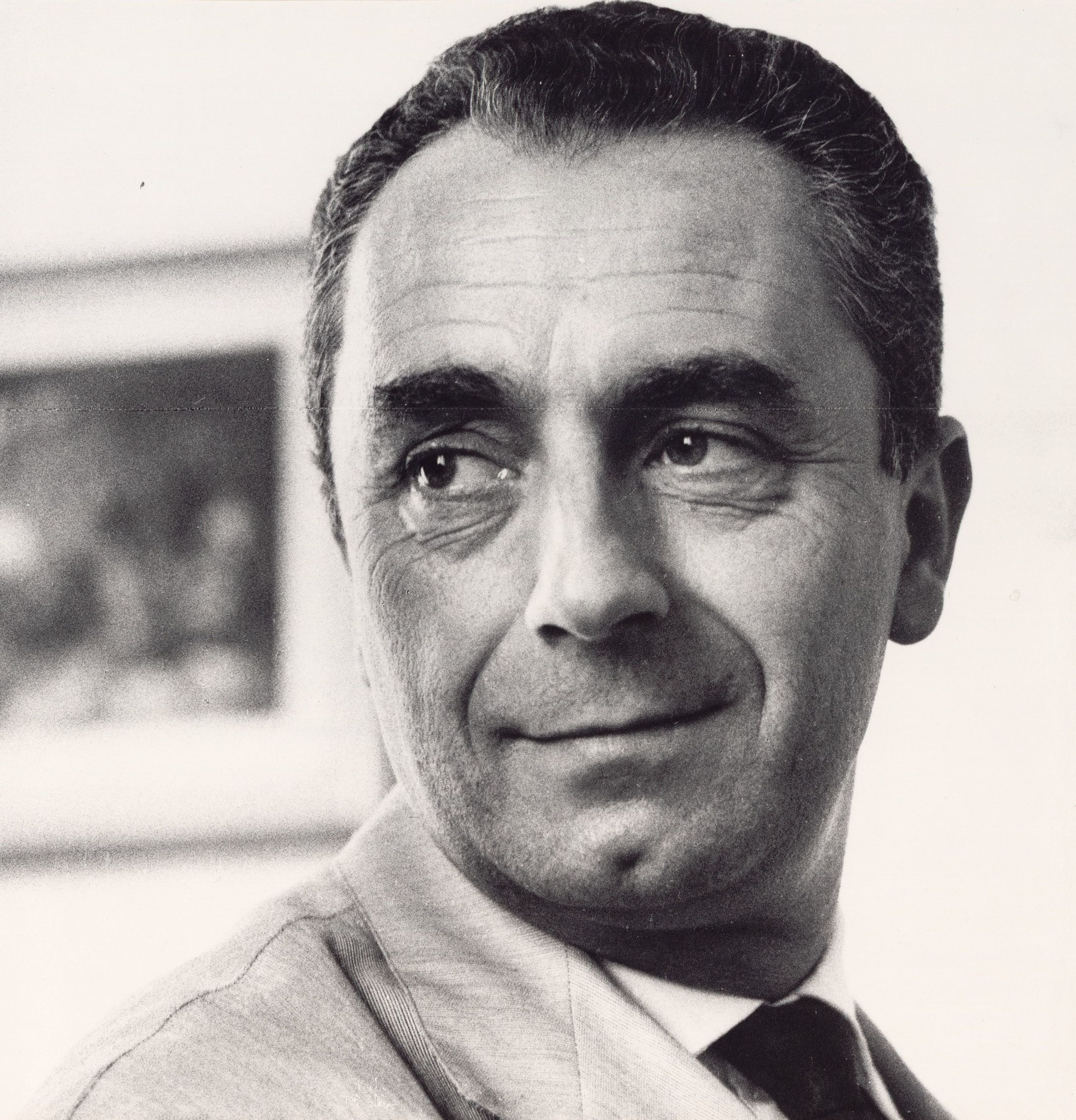
Michelangelo Antonioni won twice for L'Avventura (1960) and L'Eclisse (1962)

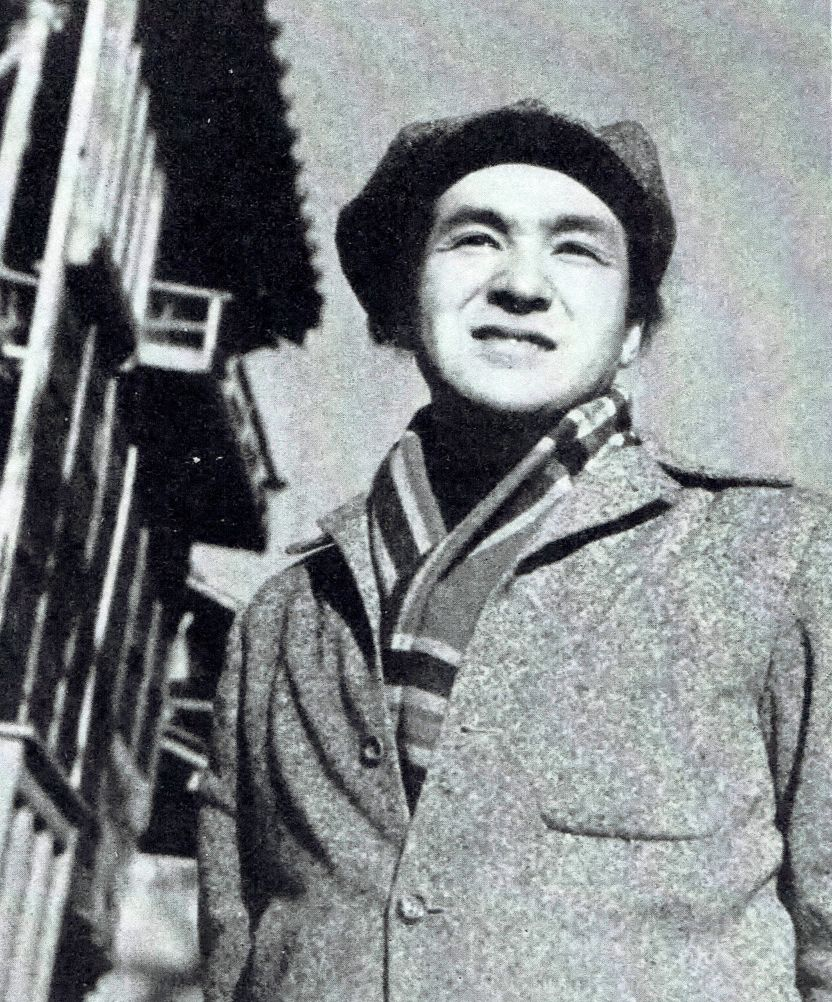
Masaki Kobayashi won for Kwaidan (1965)

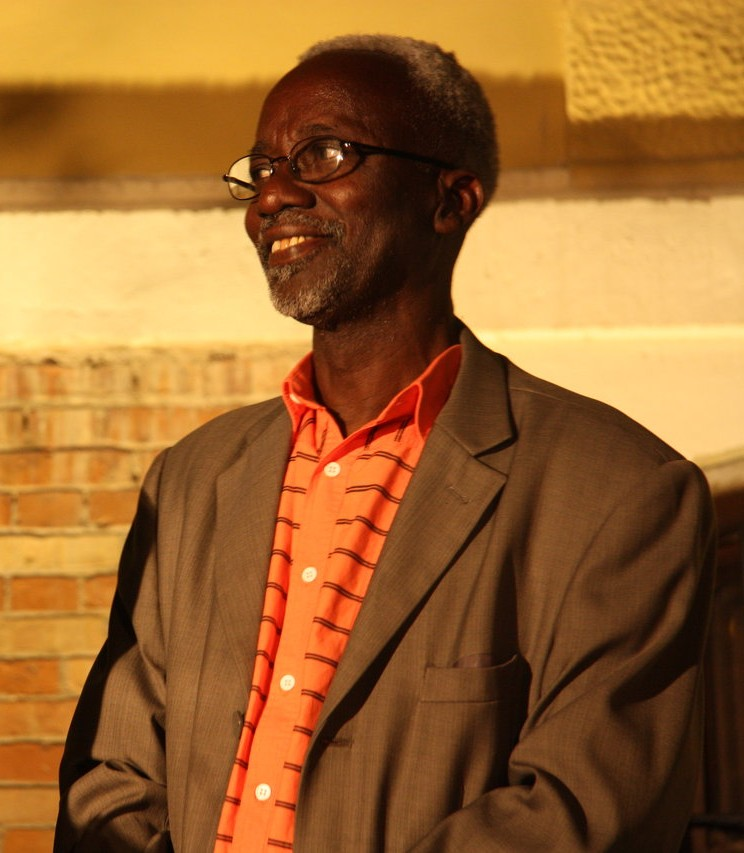
Souleymane Cissé won for Yeelen (1987)

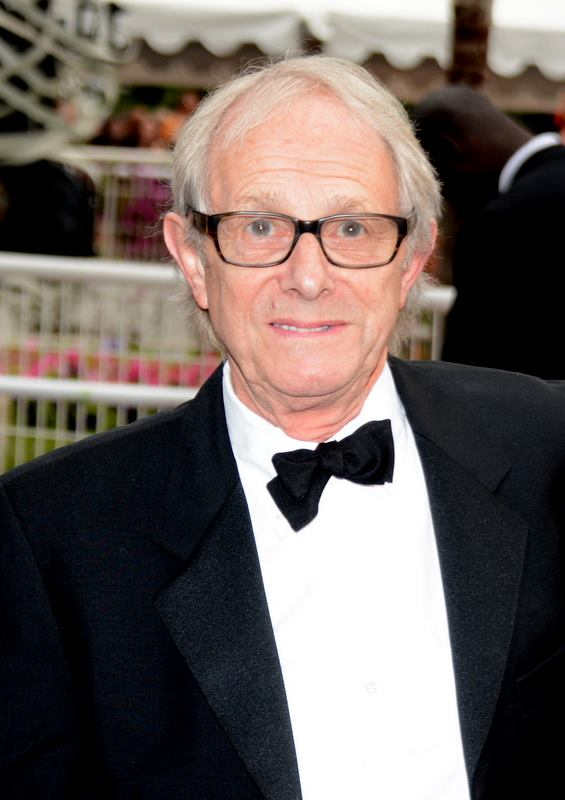
Ken Loach won three times for Hidden Agenda (1990), Raining Stones (1993) and The Angels' Share (2012)

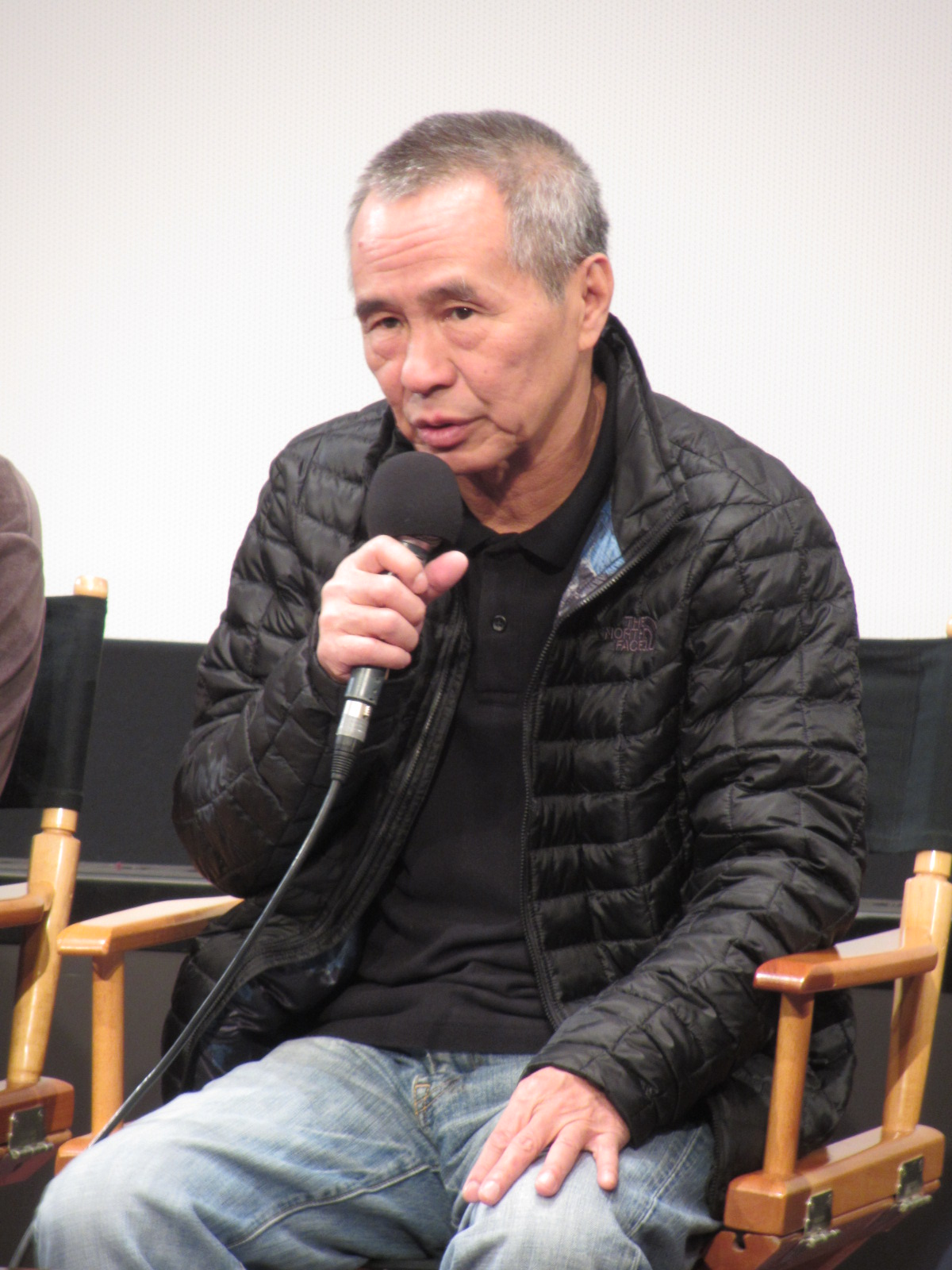
Hou Hsiao-hsien won for The Puppetmaster (1993)

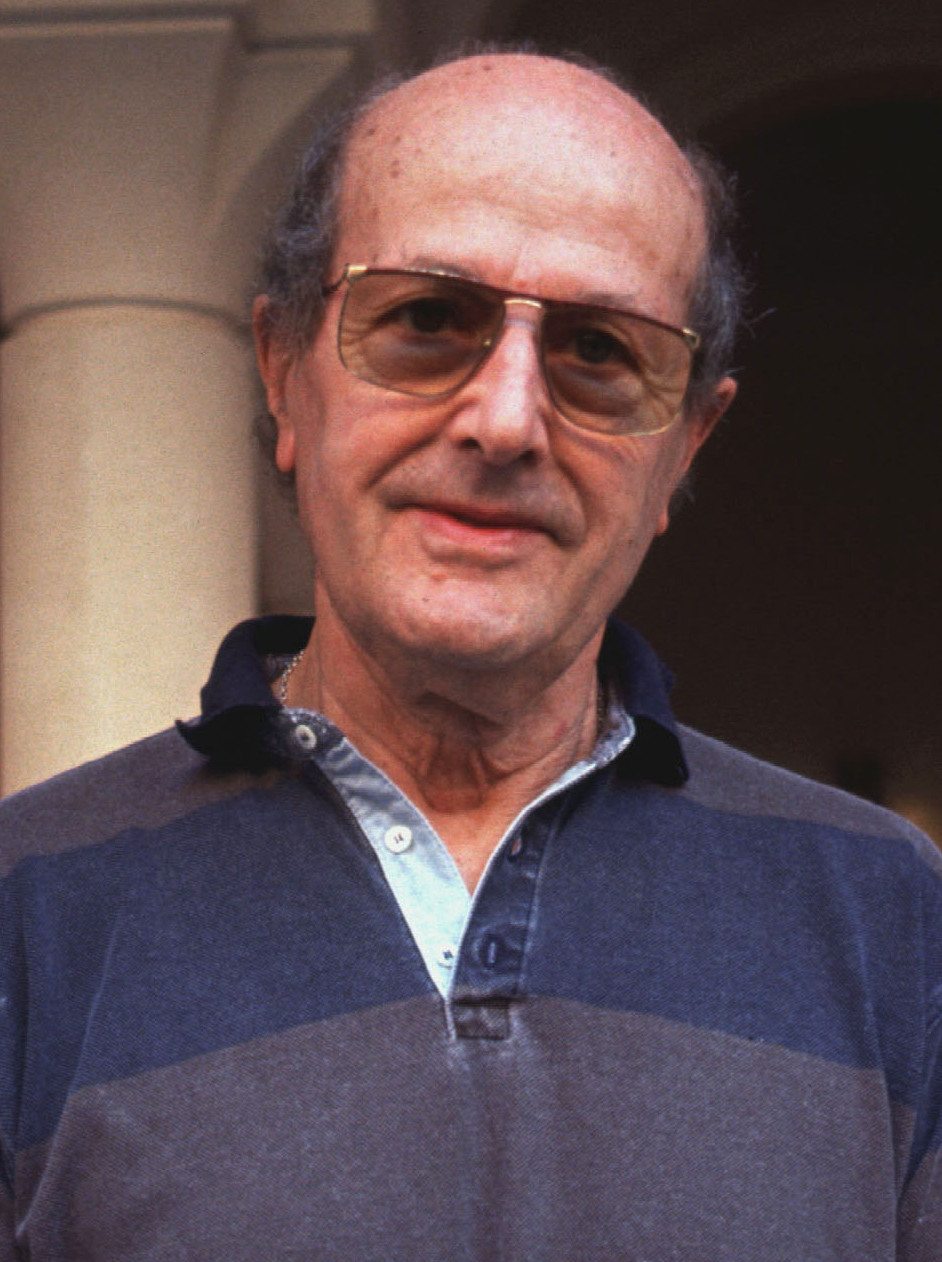
Manoel de Oliveira won for The Letter (1999)

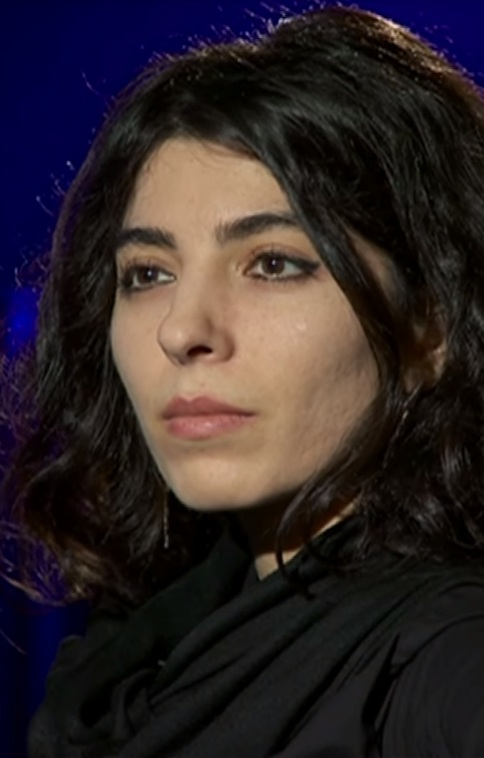
Samira Makhmalbaf won twice for Blackboards (2000) and At Five in the Afternoon (2003)

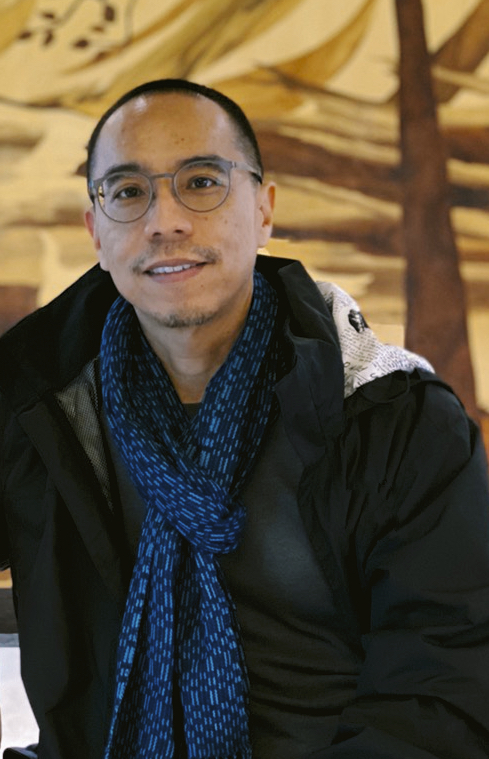
Apichatpong Weerasethakul won twice for Tropical Malady (2004) and Memoria (2021)

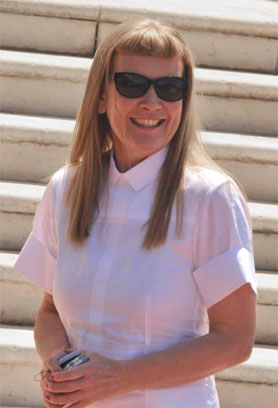
Andrea Arnold won three times for Red Road (2006), Fish Tank (2009) and American Honey (2016)

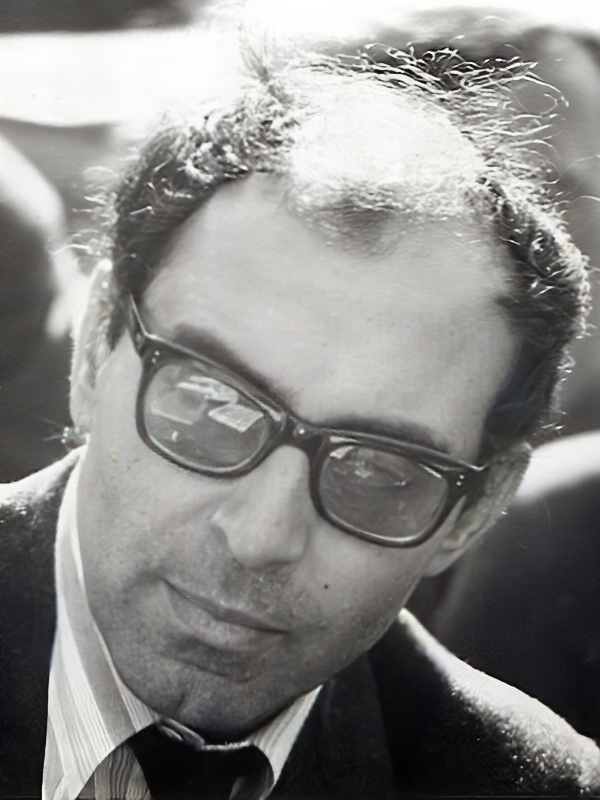
Jean-Luc Godard won for Goodbye to Language (2014)

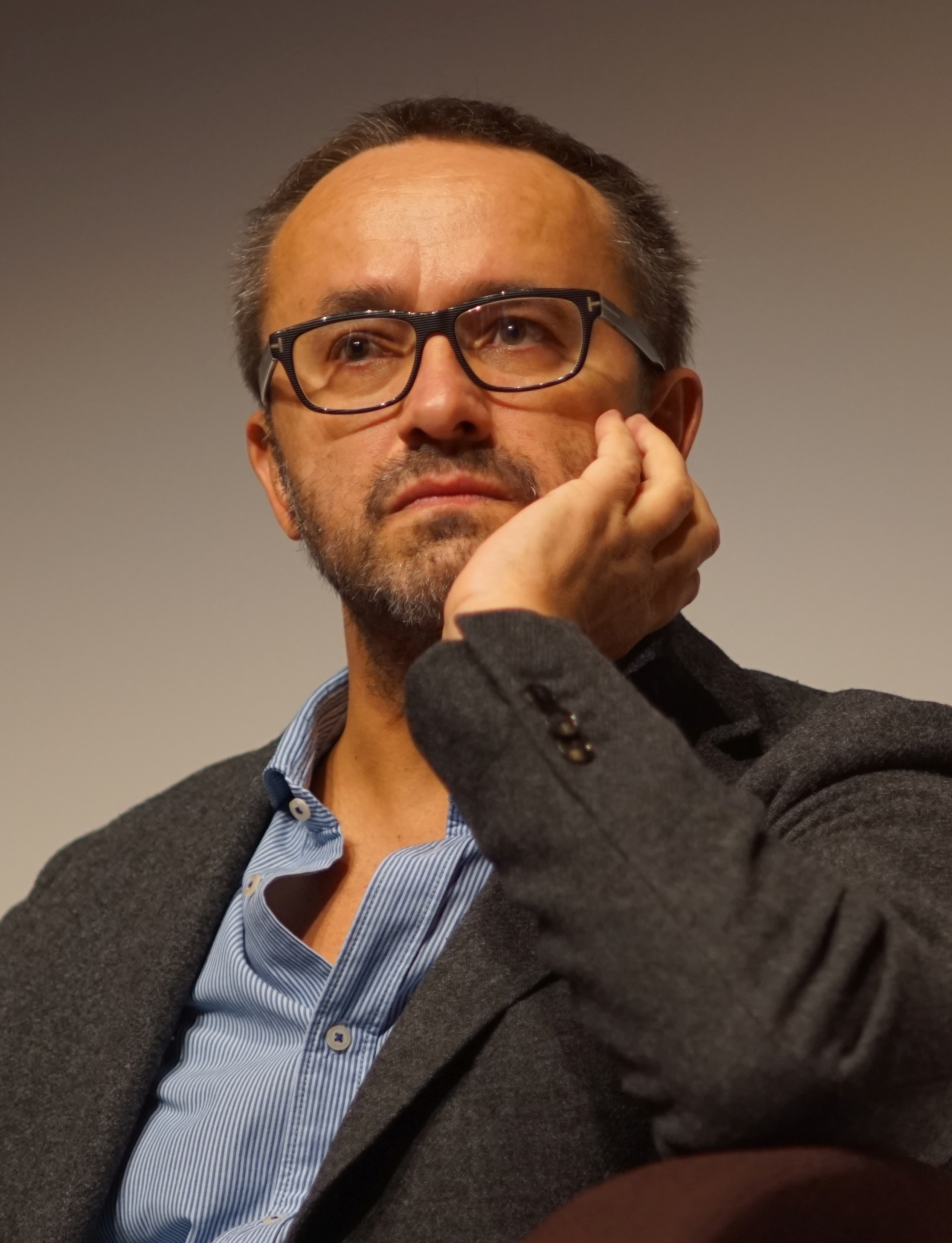
Andrey Zvyagintsev won for Loveless (2017)

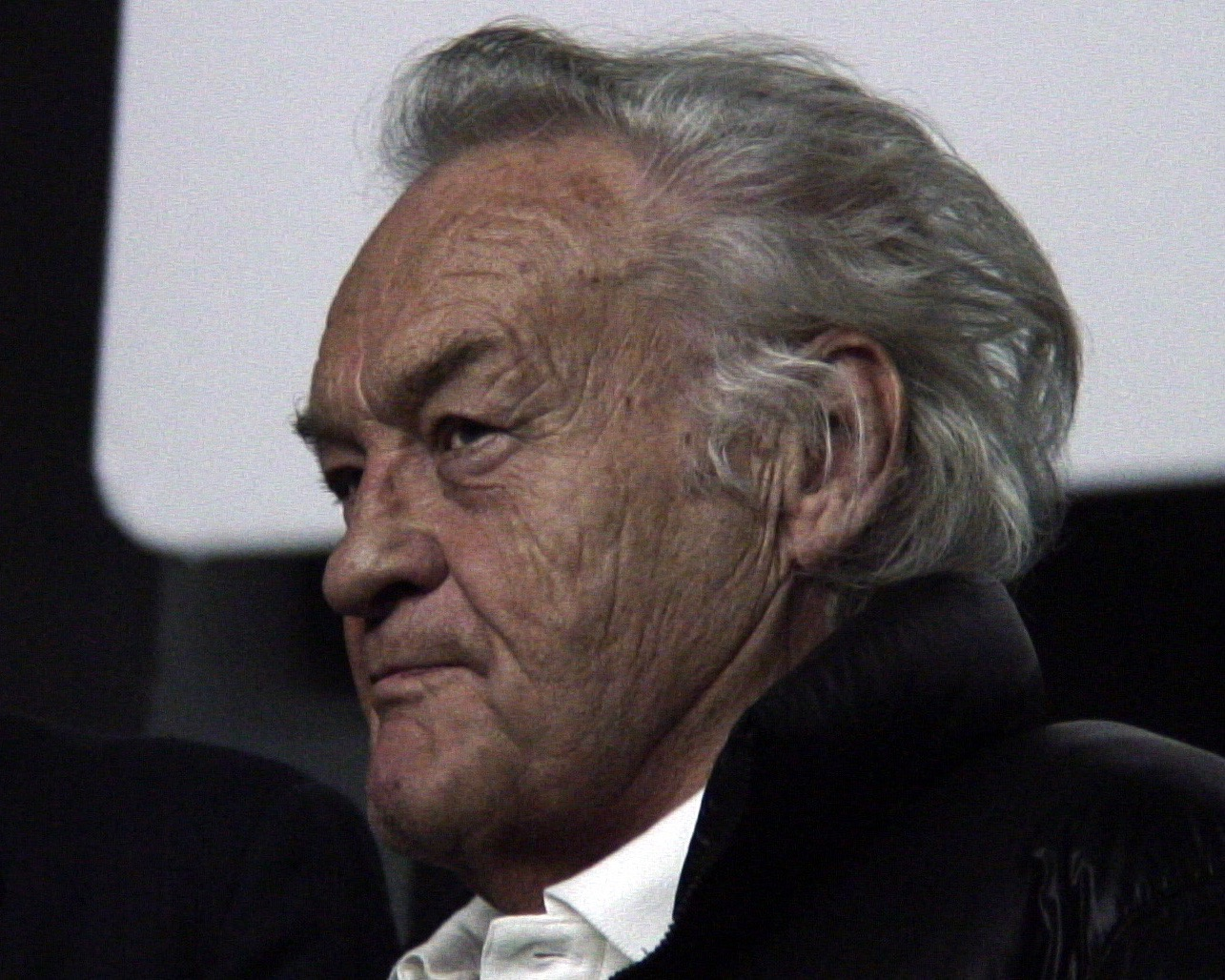
Jerzy Skolimowski won for EO (2022)

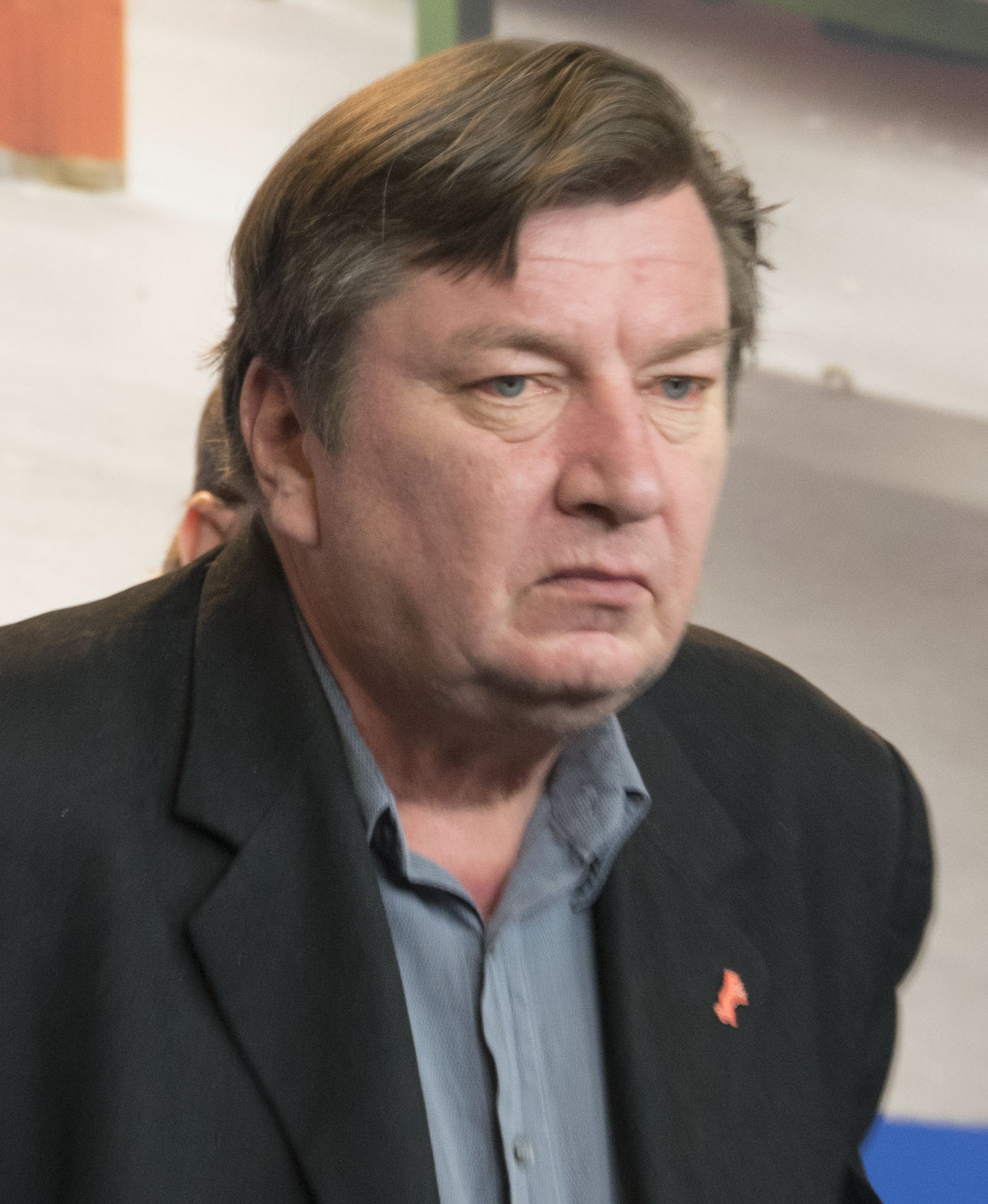
Aki Kaurismäki won for Fallen Leaves (2023)

=== 1940s ===
Year	English Title	Original Title	Recipient(s)	Production Country
1946	The Battle of the Rails	La Bataille du rail	René Clément	France

=== 1950s ===
Year	English Title	Original Title	Recipient(s)	Production Country
1951	All About Eve		Joseph L. Mankiewicz	United States
1952	We Are All Murderers	Nous sommes tous des assassins	André Cayatte	France
1954	Knave of Hearts	Monsieur Ripois	René Clément	France
1955	Lost Continent	Continente perduto	Enrico Gras, Giorgio Moser & Leonardo Bonzi	Italy
1956	The Mystery of Picasso	Le mystère Picasso	Henri-Georges Clouzot	France
1957	Kanał		Andrzej Wajda	Poland
1957	The Seventh Seal	Det sjunde inseglet	Ingmar Bergman	Sweden
1958	Mon Oncle		Jacques Tati	France
1959	Stars	Sterne	Konrad Wolf	East Germany

=== 1960s ===
Year	English Title	Original Title	Recipient(s)	Production Country
1960	L'Avventura		Michelangelo Antonioni	Italy
1960	Odd Obsession	鍵	Kon Ichikawa	Japan
1961	Mother Joan of the Angels	Matka Joanna od Aniołów	Jerzy Kawalerowicz	Poland
1962	L'Eclisse		Michelangelo Antonioni	Italy
1962	The Trial of Joan of Arc	Procès de Jeanne d'Arc	Robert Bresson	France
1963	The Cassandra Cat	Až přijde kocour	Vojtěch Jasný	Czechoslovakia
1963	Harakiri	切腹	Masaki Kobayashi	Japan
1964	Woman in the Dunes	砂の女	Hiroshi Teshigahara	Japan
1965	Kwaidan	怪談	Masaki Kobayashi	Japan
1966	Alfie		Lewis Gilbert	United Kingdom
1969	Z		Costa-Gavras	France

=== 1970s ===
Year	English Title	Original Title	Recipient(s)	Production Country
1970	The Falcons	Magasiskola	István Gaál	Hungary
1970	The Strawberry Statement		Stuart Hagmann	United States
1971	Joe Hill		Bo Widerberg	Sweden, United States
1971	Love	Szerelem	Károly Makk	Hungary
1972	Slaughterhouse-Five		George Roy Hill	United States
1973	The Hourglass Sanatorium	Sanatorium pod klepsydrą	Wojciech Has	Poland
1973	The Invitation	L'Invitation	Claude Goretta	Switzerland
1974	La prima Angélica		Carlos Saura	Spain

=== 1980s ===
Year	English Title	Original Title	Recipient(s)	Production Country
1980	The Constant Factor	Constans	Krzysztof Zanussi	Poland
1983	Kharij	খারিজ	Mrinal Sen	India
1985	Colonel Redl	Oberst Redl	István Szabó	Hungary, West Germany
1986	Thérèse		Alain Cavalier	France
1987	Shinran: Path to Purity	親鸞 白い道	Rentarō Mikuni	Japan
1987	Yeelen		Souleymane Cissé	Mali
1988	A Short Film About Killing	Krótki film o zabijaniu	Krzysztof Kieślowski	Poland
1989	Jesus of Montreal	Jésus de Montréal	Denys Arcand	Canada

=== 1990s ===
Year	English Title	Original Title	Recipient(s)	Production Country
1990	Hidden Agenda		Ken Loach	United Kingdom
1991	Europa		Lars von Trier	Denmark
1991	Out of Life	Hors la vie	Maroun Bagdadi	France
1992	Dream of Light	El sol del membrillo	Víctor Erice	Spain
1992	An Independent Life	Самостоятельная жизнь	Vitali Kanevsky	France, Russia
1993	The Puppetmaster	戲夢人生	Hou Hsiao-hsien	Taiwan
1993	Raining Stones		Ken Loach	United Kingdom
1994	La Reine Margot		Patrice Chéreau	France
1995	Don't Forget You're Going to Die	N'oublie pas que tu vas mourir	Xavier Beauvois	France
1995	Carrington ^{‡}		Christopher Hampton	United Kingdom
1996	Crash ^{‡}		David Cronenberg	Canada, United Kingdom
1997	Western		Manuel Poirier	France
1998	The Celebration	Festen	Thomas Vinterberg	Denmark
1998	Class Trip	La classe de neige	Claude Miller	France
1999	The Letter	A Carta	Manoel de Oliveira	Portugal, France, Spain

=== 2000s ===
Year	English Title	Original Title	Recipient(s)	Production Country
2000	Blackboards	تخته سیاه	Samira Makhmalbaf	Iran, Italy
2000	Songs from the Second Floor	Sånger från andra våningen	Roy Andersson	Sweden, France
2002	Divine Intervention	يد إلهية	Elia Suleiman	Palestine, Morocco, France, Germany
2003	At Five in the Afternoon	پنج عصر	Samira Makhmalbaf	Iran, France
2004	The Ladykillers *		Irma P. Hall	United States
2004	Tropical Malady	สัตว์ประหลาด	Apichatpong Weerasethakul	France, Thailand
2005	Shanghai Dreams	青红	Wang Xiaoshuai	China
2006	Red Road		Andrea Arnold	United Kingdom
2007	Persepolis		Marjane Satrapi & Vincent Paronnaud	France
2007	Silent Light	Stellet Licht	Carlos Reygadas	Mexico, France, Netherlands
2008	Il divo		Paolo Sorrentino	Italy, France
2009	Fish Tank		Andrea Arnold	United Kingdom
2009	Thirst	박쥐	Park Chan-wook	South Korea

=== 2010s ===
Year	English Title	Original Title	Recipient(s)	Production Country
2010	A Screaming Man	Un homme qui crie	Mahamat-Saleh Haroun	Chad, France, Belgium
2011	Polisse		Maïwenn	France
2012	The Angels' Share		Ken Loach	United Kingdom, France, Belgium, Italy
2013	Like Father, Like Son	そして父になる	Hirokazu Kore-eda	Japan
2014	Goodbye to Language	Adieu au Langage	Jean-Luc Godard	France
2014	Mommy		Xavier Dolan	Canada
2015	The Lobster		Yorgos Lanthimos	Ireland, United Kingdom, France, Greece, Netherlands
2016	American Honey		Andrea Arnold	United Kingdom, United States
2017	Loveless	Нелюбовь	Andrey Zvyagintsev	Russia, France, Belgium, Germany
2018	Capernaum	كفرناحوم	Nadine Labaki	Lebanon
2019	Bacurau		Kleber Mendonça Filho & Juliano Dornelles	Brazil, France
2019	Les Misérables		Ladj Ly	France

=== 2020s ===
Year	English Title	Original Title	Recipient(s)	Production Country
2021	Ahed's Knee	הברך	Nadav Lapid	France, Germany, Israel
2021	Memoria		Apichatpong Weerasethakul	Colombia, Thailand, United Kingdom, Mexico, France
2022	The Eight Mountains	Le otto montagne	Felix van Groeningen and Charlotte Vandermeersch	Italy, Belgium, France
2022	EO	IO	Jerzy Skolimowski	Poland, Italy
2023	Fallen Leaves	Kuolleet lehdet	Aki Kaurismäki	Finland
2024	Emilia Pérez		Jacques Audiard	France
2025	Sirāt		Oliver Laxe	Spain, France
2025	Sound of Falling	In die Sonne schauen	Mascha Schilinski	Germany
2026	The Dreamed Adventure	Das Geträumte Abenteuer	Valeska Grisebach	Germany, France, Austria, Bulgaria

Notes
^{‡} Awarded as "Special Jury Prize", a unique award not given annually but only at the request of the official jury.
^{*} The Jury Prize was specially awarded to Irma P. Hall for acting in The Ladykillers.

== Multiple winners ==
The following individuals received two or more Jury Prize awards:

Number of Wins	Directors	Nationality	Films
3	Ken Loach	United Kingdom	Hidden Agenda (1990), Raining Stones (1993), The Angels' Share (2012)
3	Andrea Arnold	United Kingdom	Red Road (2006), Fish Tank (2009), American Honey (2016)
2	René Clément	France	The Battle of the Rails (1946), Knave of Hearts (1954)
2	Michelangelo Antonioni	Italy	L'Avventura (1960), L'Eclisse (1962)
2	Masaki Kobayashi	Japan	Harakiri (1963), Kwaidan (1965)
2	Samira Makhmalbaf	Iran	Blackboards (2000), At Five in the Afternoon (2003)
2	Apichatpong Weerasethakul	Thailand	Tropical Malady (2004), Memoria (2021)

== See also ==
- Palme d'Or
- Grand Prix (second place)
