= 5th Berlin International Film Festival =

1955 film festival in West Berlin, Germany

- Festival poster
- Location: West Berlin, Germany
- Founded: 1951
- Awards: Golden Bear: The Rats
- Festival date: 24 June–5 July 1955
- Website: Website

Berlin International Film Festival chronology
- 6th 4th

The 5th annual Berlin International Film Festival was held from 24 June to 5 July 1955. This year's festival did not give any official jury prizes, instead awards were given by audience voting. This continued until the FIAPF granted Berlin "A-Status" in 1956.

The Golden Bear was awarded to The Rats by audience vote.

== Main Competition ==
The following films were in competition for the Golden Bear award:

English title	Original title	Director(s)	Country
Carmen Jones		Otto Preminger	United States
The Doll Merchant	Nukkekauppias ja kaunis Lilith	Jack Witikka	Finland
In the Shadow of the Karakoram	Im Schatten des Karakorum	Eugen Schuhmacher	West Germany
Lost Continent	Continente perduto	Enrico Gras and Giorgio Moser	Italy
Miracle of Marcelino	Marcelino pan y vino	Ladislao Vajda	Spain
Pantomimes		Paul Paviot	France
The Plot to Assassinate Hitler	Der 20. Juli	Falk Harnack	West Germany
The Rats	Die Ratten	Robert Siodmak	West Germany
The Seven Year Itch		Billy Wilder	United States
Siam		Ralph Wright	United States
The Vanishing Prairie		James Algar	United States
Woodpecker	Zimmerleute des Waldes	Heinz Sielmann	West Germany

== Official Awards ==
=== Main Competition ===
The following prizes were awarded by audience votes:

- Golden Bear: The Rats by Robert Siodmak
- Silver Bear: The Miracle of Marcelino by Ladislao Vajda
- Bronze Berlin Bear: Carmen Jones by Otto Preminger
- Big Gold Medal (Documentaries and Culture Films): The Vanishing Prairie by James Algar
- Big Silver Medal (Documentaries and Culture Films): Lost Continent by Enrico Gras, Giorgio Moser
- Big Bronze Medal (Documentaries and Culture Films): In the Shadow of the Karakoram by Eugen Schuhmacher
- Small Gold Medal (Short Film): Zimmerleute des Waldes by Heinz Sielmann
- Small Silver Medal (Short Film): Siam by Ralph Wright
- Small Bronze Medal (Short Film): Pantomimes by Paul Paviot
