= Wild Bunch (company) =

German and French film and distribution company

Wild Bunch AG
- Formerly: Senator Film Verleih GmbH (1972-1997); Senator Entertainment AG (1997-2002)
- Type: Public
- Traded as: FWB: WBAH
- ISIN: DE000A2TSU21
- Industry: Motion Pictures; Television (as of September 2015)
- Predecessor: Senator Entertainment AG; Wild Bunch S.A.
- Founded: 1979; 47 years ago (as Senator Film Verleih GmbH); 2002; 24 years ago (as Wild Bunch S.A.)
- Headquarters: Berlin, Germany; Paris, France
- Area served: Austria; France; Germany; Italy; Spain
- Key people: Ronald Meyer (CEO); David Desplas (CEO, France); Brahim Chioua (COO)
- Divisions: Wild Bunch Distribution (France); Wild Side (France); Filmo TV (France); Wild Side TV (France); BiM Distribuzione (Italy); Wild Bunch Germany; Central Film Verleih (Germany); Vértigo Films (Spain); Wild Bunch Austria; Wild Bunch TV; IMR International (USA)
- Website: wildbunch.eu

Wild Bunch AG is a German-French film production and distribution company, originally created in 1979 as Senator Film Verleih GmbH, which later became Senator Entertainment AG. The name Wild Bunch comes from the French company Wild Bunch S.A., created in 2002, which became a subsidiary of Senator Entertainment in February 2015. Senator Entertainment AG renamed itself Wild Bunch AG in July 2015. Wild Bunch has distributed and sold films such as Land of the Dead (2005), Southland Tales (2006), Cassandra's Dream (2007), Vicky Cristina Barcelona (2008), Che (2008), Whatever Works (2009), The King's Speech (2010), The Artist (2011), Titane and Where Is Anne Frank (2021).

Wild Bunch was also formerly an international sales holding company, but they soon divested the division as an independent company in July 2019 as Wild Bunch International, which rebranded as Goodfellas in March 2023 following the expiration of the company's three-year pact to use the Wild Bunch name.

== History ==
Originally a division of StudioCanal, Wild Bunch S.A. was established as an independent company in 2002 by former employees of StudioCanal.

In 2011, Wild Bunch took a majority stake (by means of an equity purchase made through a cash injection) of the Spanish indie distributor Vértigo Films.

In July 2014, the German film distributor Senator Entertainment and Wild Bunch announced their intention to join forces to launch an independent film distribution and production group. In February 2015, Senator Entertainment and Wild Bunch completed their merger. Senator Entertainment AG subsequently renamed themselves to Wild Bunch AG and will use Senator as a brand.

In May 2015, Wild Bunch formed a Los Angeles–based company, Insiders, to handle international sales of independent films led by Vincent Maraval. In February 2016, The Hollywood Reporter confirmed that a stake in that outfit had been sold to Bliss Media, a Chinese film production and distribution company. In May 2016, Insiders and MadRiver Pictures joined forces to form an international sales joint venture, IMR international.

On 24 July 2018, Wild Bunch received approval from the Tribunal de commerce to move ahead with their restructuring plans. At the beginning of July 2019, the company reorganized all of their international sales activities into a new division, Wild Bunch International. At the beginning of June 2021, they formed the genre-oriented label Wild West with fellow French studio Capricci, and two weeks later, announced a 50/50 animation-oriented sales partnership with French animation distributor Gebeka Films at the 62nd Annecy International Animation Film Festival.

== Activities ==
Wild Bunch is a film sales company and also a pan-European film distributor. Their former international sales division - Wild Bunch International, now named Goodfellas, pre-sells films from third-party companies.

=== France ===
In France, Wild Bunch is a theatrical distributor and also a video distributor through its subsidiary Wild Side.

Wild Bunch also positioned itself on the digital distribution market through its VoD/SVoD subsidiary Filmo TV.

=== Worldwide ===
Apart from its international sales activities, Wild Bunch is also a direct distributor in Italy, Germany, Austria and Spain.

==== Studio Ghibli ====
Wild Bunch International functions as Studio Ghibli's international sales rights holder outside Japan and North America, and since September 2020, had taken over work from Disney to become Ghibli's theatrical, home media and television distributor in France.

In December 2022, StudioCanal UK, the distributor of the films in the United Kingdom and Ireland, filed a lawsuit against Wild Bunch International over their streaming deal with Netflix, stating that the deal breached an agreement over standalone streaming rights where Wild Bunch claimed that "non-internet" streaming platforms "don't exist". WBI counter-sued StudioCanal UK, where they stated that their distribution deal was recouping distribution expenses against all forms of distribution, and not theatrical as they claimed.

== Catalogue ==
Wild Bunch manages more than 1700 titles.

=== Major awards received by films distributed or sold by Wild Bunch ===
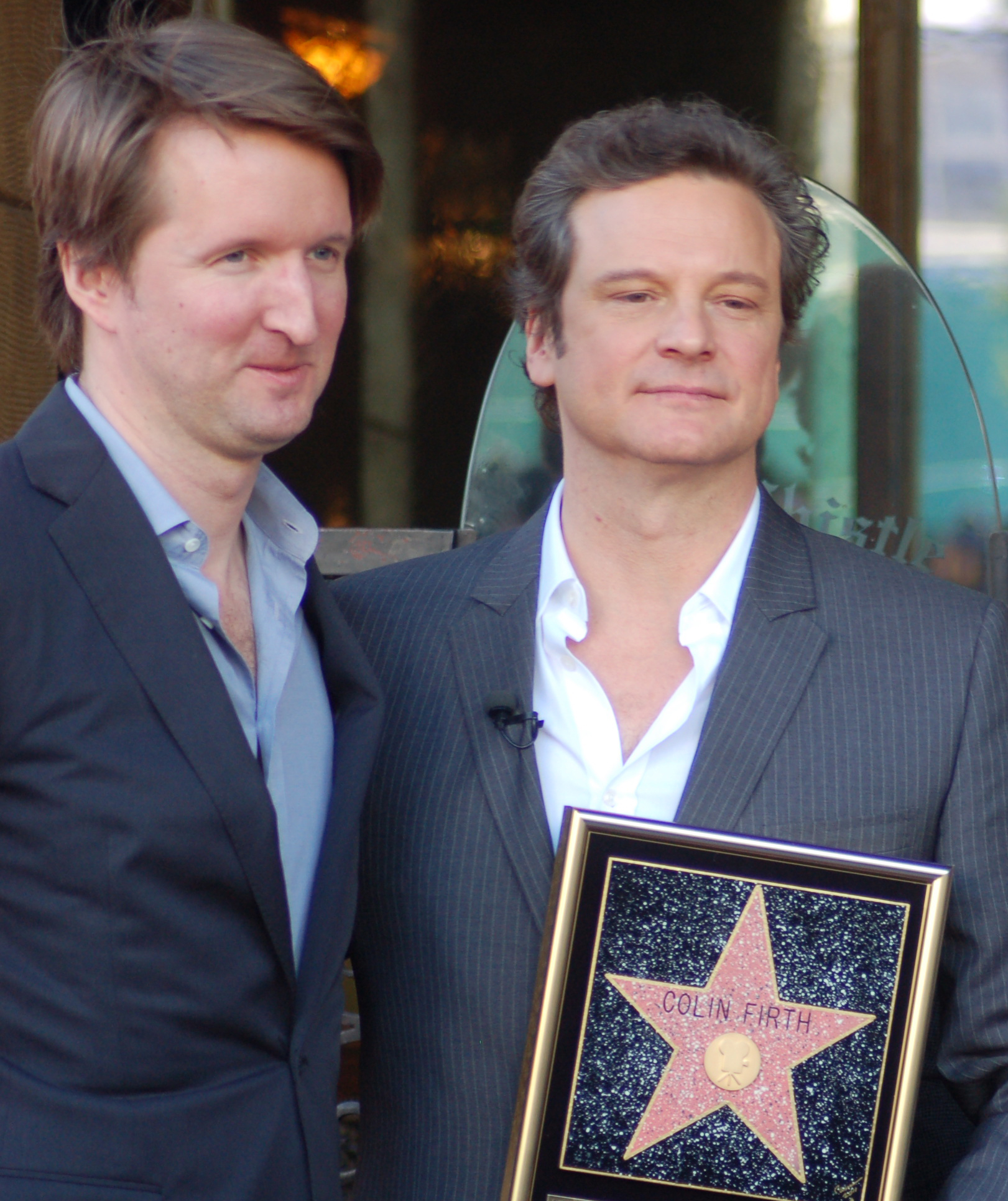
Tom Hooper and Colin Firth at a ceremony for Firth to receive a star on the Hollywood Walk of Fame

==== Academy Awards ====
- The Artist by Michel Hazanavicius in 2012: Best Picture (Thomas Langmann), Best Director (Michel Hazanavicius), Best Actor (Jean Dujardin), Best Original Score (Ludovic Bource), and Best Costume Design (Mark Bridges)
- The King's Speech by Tom Hooper in 2011: Best Picture (Iain Canning, Emile Sherman, and Gareth Unwin), Best Director (Tom Hooper), Best Actor (Colin Firth), and Best Original Screenplay (David Seidler)
- Pan's Labyrinth by Guillermo del Toro in 2007: Best Art Direction and Best Cinematography
- March of the Penguins by Luc Jacquet in 2006: Best Documentary
- Spirited Away by Hayao Miyazaki in 2003: Best Animated Feature

==== Berlin International Film Festival ====
- Before, Now & Then by Kamila Andini in 2022: Silver Bear for Outstanding Supporting Performance for Laura Basuki
- The Wayward Cloud by Tsai Ming-liang in 2005: Silver Bear of Outstanding Artistic Achievement
- Spirited Away by Hayao Miyazaki in 2002: Golden Bear

==== Cannes Film Festival ====
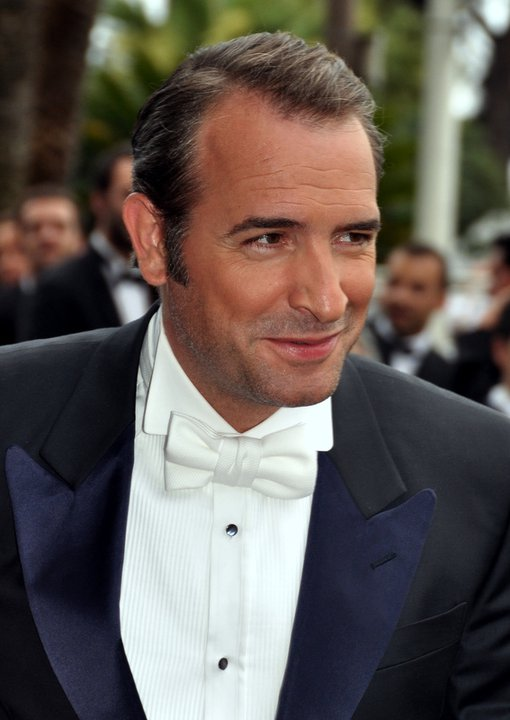
Jean Dujardin at the 2011 Cannes Film Festival for The Artist

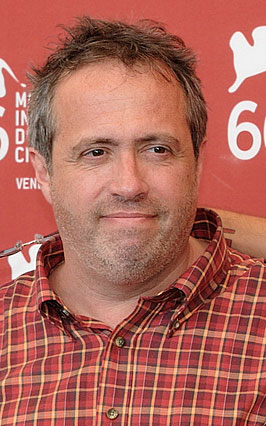
Jaco Van Dormael at the 2009 Venice Film Festival for Mr. Nobody

- Shoplifters by Hirokazu Kore-eda in 2018: Palme d'Or
- I, Daniel Blake by Ken Loach in 2016: Palme d'Or
- Goodbye to Language by Jean-Luc Godard in 2014: Prix du Jury
- Blue Is the Warmest Colour by Abdellatif Kechiche in 2013: Palme d'Or
- The Angels' Share by Ken Loach in 2012: Prix du Jury
- Beyond the Hills by Cristian Mungiu in 2012: Best Screenplay and Best Actress for Cristina Flutur et Cosmina Stratan
- The Kid with a Bike by Dardenne brothers in 2011: Grand Prix
- The Artist by Michel Hazanavicius in 2011: Best Actor for Jean Dujardin
- Polisse by Maïwenn in 2011: Prix du Jury
- Of Gods and Men by Xavier Beauvois in 2010: Grand Prix du Jury
- 4 Months, 3 Weeks and 2 Days by Cristian Mungiu in 2007: Palme d'Or
- Fahrenheit 9/11 by Michael Moore in 2004: Palme d'Or
- Oldboy by Park Chan-wook in 2004: Grand Prix du Jury
- At Five in the Afternoon by Samira Makhmalbaf in 2003: Prix du jury
- Chi-hwa-seon by Im Kwon-taek in 2002: Best Cinematography
- The Son's Room by Nanni Moretti in 2001: Palme d'Or
- Blackboards by Samira Makhmalbaf in 2000: Prix du Jury

==== Venice Film Festival ====
- Jackie by Pablo Larraín in 2016: Best Screenplay
- Mr. Nobody by Jaco Van Dormael in 2009: Golden Osella
- The Wrestler by Darren Aronofsky in 2008: Golden Lion
- Mary by Abel Ferrara in 2005: Special Jury Prize
- The Magdalene Sisters by Peter Mullan in 2002: Golden Lion
