= Mario Craveri =

Italian cinematographer, director and screenwriter

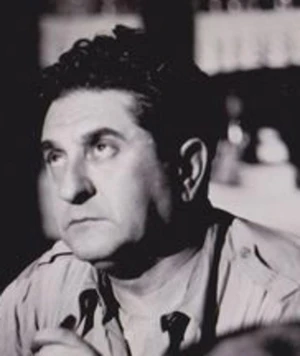
Mario Craveri

Mario Craveri (2 May 1902 – 28 February 1990) was an Italian cinematographer, director and screenwriter.

Born in Turin, Craveri debuted in 1919 as assistant operator but had his first official credit just in 1923, as "second camera operator" in Henry King's The White Sister. Later dedicated to short documentaries and in 1933 he debuted as cinematographer with the Giovacchino Forzano's film Camicia nera.

He won three Nastro d'Argento for best cinematography for Un giorno nella vita (1946), Green Magic (1954) and L'impero del sole (1957); he was also awarded with a special Nastro d'Argento in 1955 for his use of CinemaScope in Lost Continent.

In 1961 Craveri made his directorial debut with the drama film I sogni muoiono all'alba.

== Selected filmography ==
- Black Shirt (1933)
- Don Cesare di Bazan (1942)
- The Little Teacher (1942)
- The Jester's Supper (1942)
- Men of the Mountain (1943)
- Without a Flag (1951)
- Four Red Roses (1951)
- The Beach (1954)
- Dreams Die at Dawn (1961)
