= Vinicio Sofia =

Italian actor (1907–1982)

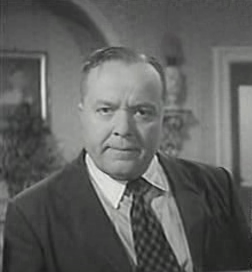
- Born: 13 November 1907; Corleone, Italy
- Died: 30 December 1982 (aged 75); Rome, Italy
- Occupations: Actor; voice actor
- Years active: 1933–1973

Vinicio Sofia (13 November 1907 – 30 December 1982) was an Italian actor and voice actor.

== Biography ==
Born in Corleone in the Metropolitan City of Palermo, Sofia began his career on screen in 1933 when he made his film debut in Black Shirt directed by Giovacchino Forzano. He appeared in over 66 films between 1933 and 1973 although he was mostly active as an actor during the 1940s and among his most popular filmography includes the 1953 comedy film Neapolitan Turk. Throughout his career, he collaborated with other actors such as Alberto Sordi, Luigi Pavese, Erminio Macario and Totò.

Sofia also maintained a successful career as a voice actor and dubber. He dubbed many actors which include James Whitmore, Andy Devine, Jack Carson, Slim Pickens, William Conrad and Eddie Cantor. In his animated film roles. He provided the Italian voices of characters in Disney films. These include Br'er Bear in Song of the South, Horace in One Hundred and One Dalmatians and Carpenter and Tweedledum in Alice in Wonderland.

Sofia retired in the early 1970s and he died in Rome a decade later.

== Filmography ==
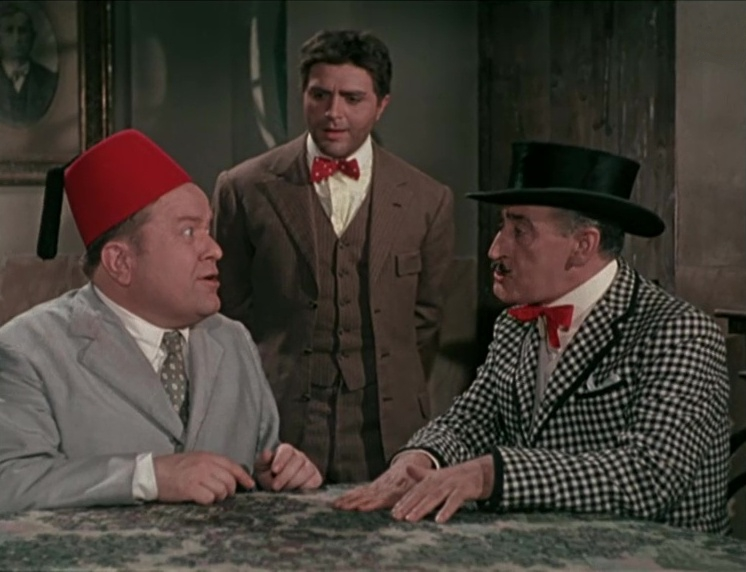
Sofia (left) with Aldo Giuffrè and Totò in Neapolitan Turk (1953)

- Black Shirt (1933) - Il sovversivo
- Everybody's Woman (1934) - L'aiuto regista
- Seconda B (1934) - Il segretario di Renzi
- Loyalty of Love (1934) - Un uomo di fiducia del barone Salvati
- 100 Days of Napoleon (1935) - Un deputato
- I'll Give a Million (1935) - Director of the newspaper (uncredited)
- L'avvocato difensore (1935)
- The Magnificent Rogue (1935) - Il venditore del falco (uncredited)
- A Woman Between Two Worlds (1936) - L'amministratore di Trenchmann
- Continental Atmosphere (1936) - Prof Spallotta
- Ginevra degli Almieri (1936) - (uncredited)
- Lohengrin (1936) - Il venditore di mobili
- Doctor Antonio (1937) - Turi
- Bertoldo, Bertoldino e Cacasenno (1937)
- Tomb of the Angels (1937) - Angiolino
- It Was I! (1937) - Nardelli
- The Count of Brechard (1938)
- L'amor mio non muore! (1938)
- Equatore (1939) - Goffredo
- Follie del secolo (1939) - Il direttore del ristorante "Chez Pompon"
- Hurricane in the Tropics (1939) - Il radiotelegrafista
- Lo vedi come sei... lo vedi come sei? (1939) - Il sindaco del paese
- Sei bambine e il Perseo (1940) - Il tontinelli
- Non me lo dire! (1940) - Un cliente del negozio
- Caravaggio (1941)
- The King of England Will Not Pay (1941) - Il Cocchi, banchiere del contado
- Ragazza che dorme (1941)
- Don Buonaparte (1941) - L'avvocato
- Villa da vendere (1941) - Paco
- Arriviamo noi! (1942)
- Before the Postman (1942) - Il portiere dell'albergo (uncredited)
- La maestrina (1942) - Un passeggero sulla corriera
- The Countess of Castiglione (1942) - Un amico degli Oldoini (uncredited)
- Romanzo di un giovane povero (1942)
- Nothing New Tonight (1942) - Il direttore del teatro
- The Boy of the West (1943) - Pierre, il proprietario del saloon
- I Do Not Move! (1943) - Il nuovo inquilino
- Vietato ai minorenni (1944)
- Macario Against Zagomar (1944) - La comare Pigliatutto
- The Za-Bum Circus (1945) - (segment "Galop finale al circo")
- La Fornarina (1944) - Baviera
- The Innocent Casimiro (1945) - Il professore Polpettone
- Un mese d'onestà (1948)
- Fear and Sand (1948) - Paquito's manager
- Toto Tours Italy (1948) - Augusto
- Fabiola (1949)
- Adam and Eve (1949) - General (uncredited)
- Dead Woman's Kiss (1949) - Moreno
- Little Lady (1949) - Modesto Rinaldi
- The Merry Widower (1950) - Un poliziotto
- Totò Tarzan (1950) - Il barone Rosen
- The Thief of Venice (1950) - Il tesoriere Grazzi
- Mamma Mia, What an Impression! (1951) - L'energumeno
- Accidents to the Taxes!! (1951) - Il vizir
- The Adventures of Mandrin (1952) - Stefano Vernet
- I morti non pagano tasse (1952) - Direttore generale
- Neapolitan Turk (1953) - Il vero turco
- Bertoldo, Bertoldino e Cacasenno (1954, Remake) - Bertoldo
- Are We Men or Corporals? (1955) - Cesarino Ossobucco
- Le schiave di Cartagine (1956) - Mercante di schave
- Ladro lui, ladra lei (1958) - Brigadiere di Gnaccharetta
- Scandali al mare (1961) - Direttore dell'albergo
- The Triumph of Robin Hood (1962) - Sir Tristan of Goldsborough
- The Motorized Women (1963) - Commendator Pelliccioni (segment "La Signora Ci Marcia")
- Giacobbe, l'uomo che lottò con Dio (1963)
- I patriarchi (1963) - Tubal-cain
- The Snatching (1965)
- We Are All in Temporary Liberty (1971) - Neo-fascist orator
- L'Aretino nei suoi ragionamenti sulle cortigiane, le maritate e... i cornuti contenti (1972) - Grasso
- Le mille e una notte... e un'altra ancora! (1973) - King Shaliar

== Voice work ==
Year	Title	Role	Notes
1978	They Called Him Bulldozer	Crow	Voice-over (uncredited)

=== Dubbing ===
==== Films (Animation, Italian dub) ====
Year	Title	Role(s)	Ref
1950	Cinderella	Doorman	
1950	Song of the South	Br'er Bear	
1951	Alice in Wonderland	Carpenter	
1951	Alice in Wonderland	Tweedledum	
1953	Peter Pan	Mr. Smee	
1960	Alakazam the Great	Sir Quigley Broken Bottom	
1961	One Hundred and One Dalmatians	Horace	
1967	Asterix the Gaul	Tullius Octopus	
1977	The Wild Swans	Prime Minister	
