= Black Shirt (film) =

1933 film

- Directed by: Giovacchino Forzano
- Written by: Giovacchino Forzano
- Produced by: Giovacchino Forzano; Eugenio Fontana
- Cinematography: Mario Albertelli; Eugenio Bava; Mario Craveri; Ercole Granata; Giulio Rufini
- Edited by: Giovacchino Forzano; Mario Bonotti
- Music by: Gian Luca Tocchi
- Production company: Istituto Luce
- Distributed by: Istituto Luce
- Release date: 23 March 1933
- Running time: 73 minutes
- Country: Italy
- Language: Italian

Black Shirt (Italian: Camicia nera) is a 1933 Italian drama film directed by Giovacchino Forzano. The film was made by the Istituto Luce as a propaganda work to commemorate the tenth anniversary of Mussolini's Fascist regime. It portrays events in Italy from the beginning of the First World War to the coming to power of Mussolini and the transformation of the country since. It combines elements of normal fiction films, documentary and futurist influences.

The film The Old Guard, released the following year, is also set in the period leading up to the March on Rome.

== Cast ==
- Enrico Marroni as Il marinaio
- Antonietta Mecale as La moglie del fabbro
- Enrico Da Rosa as Il fabbro
- Guido Petri as Il suocero
- Lamberto Patacconi as Il figlio a 4 anni
- Pino Locchi as Il figlio a 8 anni
- Vinicio Sofia as Il sovversivo
- Renato Tofone as Don Venanzio, il parroco
- Avelio Bandoni as Un combattente
- Leo Bartoli as Un combattente
- Annibale Betrone as Il sindaco
- Luisella Ciocca as Una popalana romana
- Attila Della Spora as Un combattente
- Giovanni Ferrari as Un combattente
- Loris Gizzi as Un acceso sovversivo
- Anna Konopleff

== Bibliography ==
- Brunetta, Gian Piero. The History of Italian Cinema: A Guide to Italian Film from Its Origins to the Twenty-first Century. Princeton University Press, 2009.
