= Eugenio Bava =

Italian cinematographer

- Born: 4 June 1886; Gardone Riviera, Kingdom of Italy
- Died: October 23, 1966 (aged 80); Rome, Italy
- Occupation: Cinematographer
- Children: Mario Bava
- Relatives: Lamberto Bava (grandson)

Eugenio Bava (4 June 1886 – 23 October 1966) was an Italian cinematographer.

His son was film director Mario Bava and his grandson is Italian horror film director Lamberto Bava.

== Selected filmography ==
- Cabiria (1914)
- Black Shirt (1933)
