= Mikhail Lavrovsky =

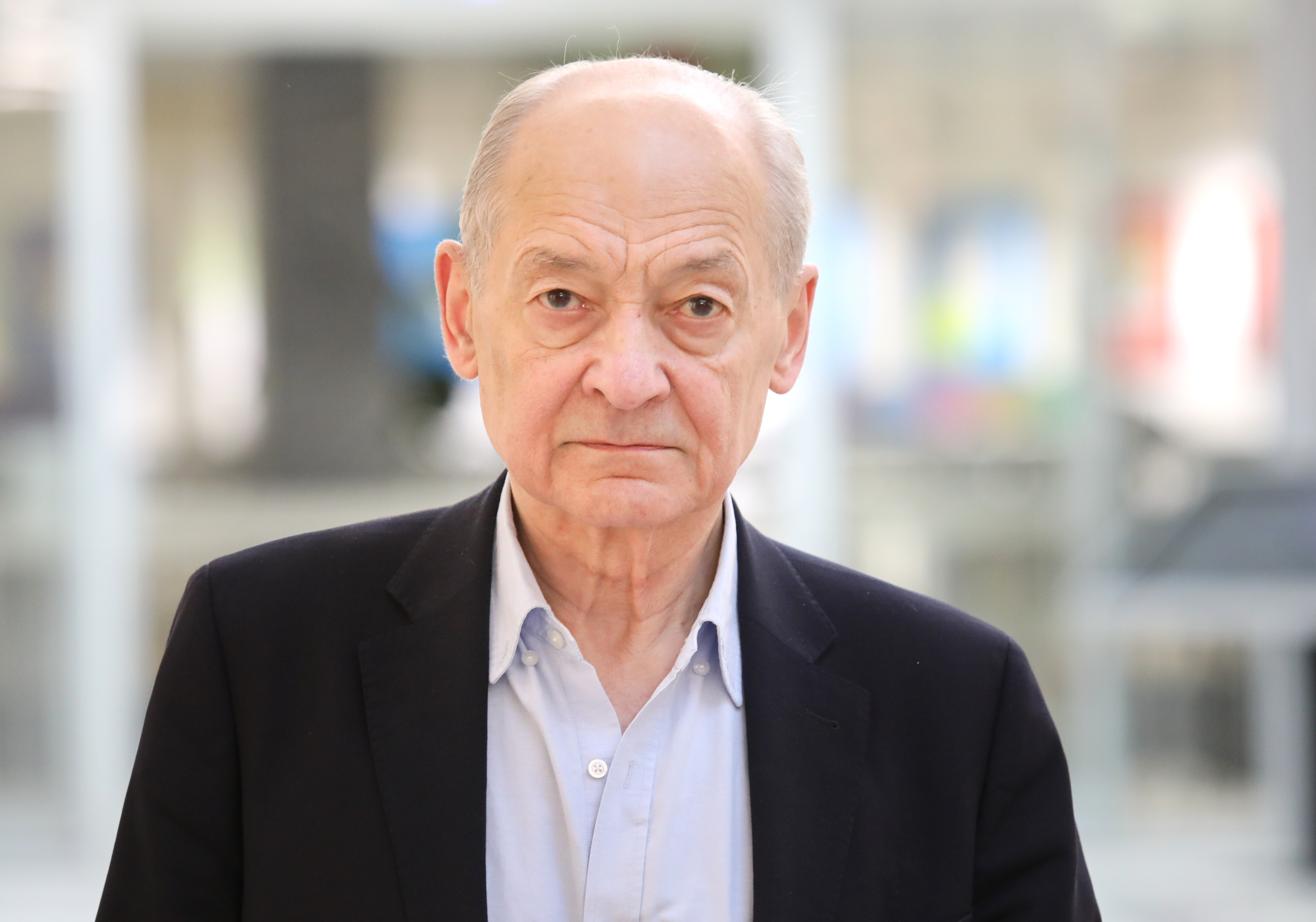
Lavrovsky in 2023

Mikhail Leonidovich Lavrovsky (Russian: Михаил Леонидович Лавровский; born 29 October 1941) is a Soviet and Russian former principal dancer of the Bolshoi Ballet.

== Biography ==
Lavrovsky was born in Tbilisi to a family of respected dancers. His father, Leonid Lavrovsky, was a well-known choreographer, while his mother, Elena Chikvaidze, was a ballerina. He was trained at the Moscow Choreographic School where his teachers were Olga Khodot and Nikolai Tarasov, and graduated from there in 1961. Three years later, Yury Grigorovich, a well-known choreographer and teacher, arrived at the Bolshoi. He gave Lavrovsky the role of the prince in The Nutcracker, and later on Lavrovsky appeared in such roles as Ferkhad in Legend of Love, as well as in Spartacus for which he won the Lenin Prize.

In 1977 he was promoted to principal dancer and became a choreographer at the Tbilisi Ballet. The same year, he was awarded the State Prize and was appointed as an artistic director of the Paliashvili Theatre from 1983 to 1985. Prior to that, in 1980, he became a ballet master after graduating from the Russian Academy of Theatre Arts, where he served till 1988. In 2001, Ballet Magazine awarded him their Soul of the Dance award.
