= Dreams Die at Dawn =

1961 Italian film

- Directed by: Mario Craveri; Enrico Gras; Indro Montanelli
- Written by: Indro Montanelli
- Produced by: Franco Magli
- Starring: Lea Massari; Ivo Garrani; Aroldo Tieri
- Cinematography: Ubaldo Marelli; Giovanni Raffaldi
- Edited by: Eraldo Da Roma
- Music by: Angelo Francesco Lavagnino
- Production company: Rizzoli Film
- Distributed by: Cineriz
- Release date: 1961
- Running time: 92 minutes
- Country: Italy
- Language: Italian

Dreams Die at Dawn (Italian: I sogni muoiono all'alba) is a 1961 Italian drama film directed by Mario Craveri, Enrico Gras and Indro Montanelli. It is set during the Hungarian Revolution of 1956.

== Cast ==
- Lea Massari as Anna Miklos
- Ivo Garrani as Andrea
- Gianni Santuccio as Gianni
- Aroldo Tieri as Antonio
- Mario Feliciani as Mario
- Renzo Montagnani as Sergio
- Rina Centa as Ethel Miklos

== Bibliography ==
- Goble, Alan. The Complete Index to Literary Sources in Film. Walter de Gruyter, 1999.
