= The Vanishing Prairie =

1954 documentary film directed by James Algar

- Official release poster
- Directed by: James Algar
- Written by: James Algar; Winston Hibler
- Produced by: Ben Sharpsteen; Walt Disney
- Narrated by: Winston Hibler
- Cinematography: N. Paul Kenworthy
- Edited by: Lloyd L. Richardson
- Music by: Paul J. Smith
- Production company: Walt Disney Productions
- Distributed by: Buena Vista Distribution
- Release date: August 17, 1954
- Running time: 60 minutes (VHS and Wild Discovery version); 71 minutes (original)
- Country: United States
- Language: English
- Box office: $1.75 million (US and Canadian rentals)

The Vanishing Prairie is a 1954 American documentary film directed by James Algar and released by Walt Disney Productions.

The theme music was given a set of lyrics by Hazel "Gil" George. It was rechristened as "Pioneer's Prayer" in Westward Ho, the Wagons!, a western film about pioneers on the Oregon Trail.

The Vanishing Prairie was released on video in 1985, and 1993 in United States.

== Awards ==
- 5th Berlin International Film Festival: Big Gold Medal (Documentaries and Culture Films)
- Academy Award for Best Documentary Feature (1954)
