= Blackboards =

- Directed by: Samira Makhmalbaf
- Written by: Mohsen Makhmalbaf; Samira Makhmalbaf
- Starring: Said Mohamadi
- Music by: Mohammad-Reza Darvishi
- Distributed by: Artificial Eye (UK); Leisure Time Features (USA); Wellspring Media (US DVD)
- Release date: 25 October 2000 (U.S.)
- Running time: 85 minutes
- Countries: Iran; Italy; Japan
- Language: Kurdish

Blackboards (Persian: تخته سیاه, Takhté siah; Kurdish: تەختێ رەش, romanized: Textê Reş) is a 2000 Iranian film directed by Samira Makhmalbaf. It focuses on a group of Kurdish refugees after the chemical bombing of Halabja by Saddam Hussein's Iraq during the Iran–Iraq War. The screenplay was co-written by Makhmalbaf with her father, Mohsen Makhmalbaf. The dialogue is entirely in Kurdish. Makhmalbaf describes it as "something between reality and fiction. Smuggling, being homeless, and people's efforts to survive are all part of reality... the film, as a whole, is a metaphor."

The film was an international co-production of the Makhmalbaf Productions of Iran, the Italian companies Fabrica and Rai Cinema, and the Japanese company T-Mark.

== Plot ==
Following a bombing in Iranian Kurdistan, schoolteachers wander from village to village in search of students.

One of them comes across a group of teenagers working as "mules," smuggling goods across the border into Iraq. Despite the teachers' efforts, none of them is interested in learning—except for the young Rêbwar.

Another teacher meets a group of elderly men trying to return to their native land to spend their final days. One of them is traveling with his daughter, a young widow, and her son. The teacher decides to follow them.

== Cast ==
- Said Mohamadi as 1.Teacher Saeed
- Behnaz Jafari as Halaleh
- Bahman Ghobadi as 2.Teacher Rebvar
- Mohamad Karim Rahmati as Father
- Rafat Moradi as Pupil Rebvar

== Reception ==
On the review aggregator website Rotten Tomatoes, 74% of critics' reviews are positive. Metacritic, which uses a weighted average, assigned the film a score of 64 out of 100, based on 13 critics, indicating "generally favorable" reviews.

== Awards ==
- "Jury Prize", Official Competition section of the 2000 Cannes Film Festival, France.
- "Federico Fellini Honor", UNESCO, Paris, 2000.
- "François Truffaut prize", Giffoni Film Festival in Italy 2000.
- "Giffoni's Mayor Prize", Giffoni Film Festival, Italy, 2000.
- "Special cultural Prize", UNESCO, Paris, 2000.
- "The Grand Jury prize", American Film Institute, USA, 2000
