= Lost Continent (1955 film) =

- Directed by: Enrico Gras; Giorgio Moser; Leonardo Bonzi
- Music by: Angelo Francesco Lavagnino
- Distributed by: Lopert Pictures (US theatrical)
- Release dates: 1955 (Italy); 11 March 1957 (New York City)
- Running time: 120 minutes
- Country: Italy
- Language: Italian

Continente Perduto (a.k.a. Lost Continent and Continent Perdu) is a 1955 Italian documentary film about Maritime Southeast Asia including Borneo.

== Awards ==
It has received the following awards:

- 1955 Cannes Film Festival: Special Jury Prize
- 5th Berlin International Film Festival: Big Silver Medal (Documentaries and Culture Films)

== Legacy ==
French literary critic Roland Barthes dedicates an essay to the film in his semiological work, Mythologies. He criticizes the filmmakers as perpetuating a European sense of exoticism, while also imposing their own Christian values onto the Buddhist traditions of the region.
