= Leonid Lavrovsky =

Soviet and Russian ballet dancer and choreographer

- Born: Leonid Mikhailovich Ivanov; June 18, 1905; Saint Petersburg, Russian Empire
- Died: November 26, 1967 (aged 62); Paris, France
- Occupations: Ballet dancer, choreographer
- Notable work: Romeo and Juliet
- Spouse: Elena Chikvaidze
- Children: Mikhail Lavrovsky
- Awards: People's Artist of the USSR

Leonid Mikhailovich Lavrovsky (Russian: Леонид Михайлович Лавровский; 18 June 1905 – 26 November 1967) was a Soviet and Russian ballet dancer and choreographer, most famous for choreographing the first full version of Sergei Prokofiev's Romeo and Juliet.

== Early life ==
Lavrovsky was born in 1905 in St. Petersburg, the son of an industrial worker named Ivanov. Leonid Ivanov changed his surname to Lavrovsky and graduated in 1922 from the Petrograd Ballet Academy, where he had studied under V.I. Ponomaryov. He danced with the former Mariinsky Theatre, performing such roles as Siegfried in Swan Lake, Jean de Brienne in Raymonda, and the lead in Chopiniana. During the same period, Lavrovsky was also a member of the Molodoy Ballet (Young Ballet), an experimental dance collective whose members included the young George Balanchine. Lavrovsky performed in Fyodor Lopukhov's Dance Symphony along with Balanchine, Alexandra Danilova, and Lidia Ivanova.

Lavrovsky's first major work as a choreographer was the ballet Katerina, which he created for a graduation performance. The ballet told the story of a serf theater, and was choreographed to music by Anton Rubinstein and Adolphe Adam. In the late 1930s, Lavrovsky was made the artistic director of the ballet troupe of the Kirov Theatre.

== Romeo and Juliet ==
In 1938, the Kirov Theater agreed to stage Sergei Prokofiev's Romeo and Juliet. Lavrovsky and Prokofiev struggled for a period over the score and libretto, Lavrovsky eventually persuading the composer to add variations for Romeo and Juliet as well as some other incidental numbers. The ballet premiered on January 11, 1940. It featured sets by Pyotr Vilyams and starred Galina Ulanova in the role of Juliet and Konstantin Sergeyev in the role of Romeo. Lavrovsky's production is widely recognized as one of the greatest examples of the drambalet genre in Soviet Theater. Lavrovsky's choreography for the ballet is highly dramatic and largely realistic, closely hewing to the motions taken by stage actors and mostly eschewing traditional ballet divertissements.

== Bolshoi Theater ==
In 1944, largely owing to the success of Romeo and Juliet, Lavrovsky was made the head ballet master for the Bolshoi Theatre in Moscow. In 1946, he restaged Romeo and Juliet for the Bolshoi. For this production, which also starred Ulanova, he was awarded the Stalin Prize, first class. In 1955, Romeo and Juliet was made into a full-length film, starring Galina Ulanova and Yuri Zhdanov.

At the Bolshoi, Lavrovsky staged the premiere production of Prokofiev's The Tale of the Stone Flower, a ballet based on a short story by Pavel Bazhov. His last major work was Paganini, a fantastic re-imagining of the life of Niccolo Paganini set to Sergei Rachmaninoff's Rhapsody on a Theme of Paganini, which premiered in 1960.

== Later life ==
In the early 1960s, Lavrovsky's style of choreography came under attack for its realism and lack of dance from a group of young choreographers, including the rising star Yury Grigorovich. Lavrovsky publicly retaliated in his key note address for the All-Union Choreographic Conference held in Moscow in 1960. Nevertheless, Lavrovsky eventually lost the battle; he was replaced by Grigorovich as artistic director for the Bolshoi Theatre in 1964. From 1964 to his death in 1967, Lavrovsky served as a professor at the Moscow State Academy of Choreography.

== Personal life ==
Lavrovsky married former ballet dancer Elena Chikvaidze; their son, Mikhail Lavrovsky, was a principal dancer with the Bolshoi Theatre.
