= Ion Bostan (film director) =

Romanian filmmaker (1914–1992)

- Born: December 15, 1914; Chernowitz, Duchy of Bukovina, Austria-Hungary
- Died: May 29, 1992 (aged 77); Bucharest, Romania
- Occupation: Film director
- Known for: His movies

Ion Bostan (Romanian pronunciation: [iˈon bosˈtan]; December 15, 1914, Chernowitz – May 29, 1992, Bucharest) was a documentary film director from Romania.

== Awards ==
- Mamaia, 1964, Under the Eagle's Wing
- Tehran, 1968, The Sarmatian Sea, the Black Sea
- Novi Sad, 1969, Histria, Heraclea and the Swans
- Rio de Janeiro, 1970, The Heron – a Reptile-Bird
- ACIN, 1972, The Sunken Forest
- Tehran, 1973, The Sunken Forest
- ACIN, 1973, Seagulls with Clean Wings
- ACIN, 1975, A Willing Robinson
- ACIN, 1976, The Storks Are Coming

== Works ==
- The Sturgeon and Migrating Herring (1971)
- The Giant Beluga (1981)
- The Sturgeon Are Preparing for the Storm (1969)
- Fish and Fishermen (1971)
- The Swans' Village (1974)
- Fishing amidst Pelicans and Water Lilies (1978)
- Sulina (1981)
- The Migration of Birds (1982)
- Gold, Silver and History (1982)
- Hitchcock's Seagulls (1982)
- An Age-Old Profession: Fishing (1983)
- In the Green Jungle of the Depths (1983)
- The Floating Island (1983)
- The Flutter of Wings, Everywhere (1983)
- Oaks and Lianas (1983)
- The Pelicans Are Coming Back (1983)
- The Stone Whale – the Island of Popina (1985)
- When Water Lilies Bloom (1985)
- The Cormorants Were Flying Past (1986)
- The Splendor of the Holy Frescoes (1990)
- A Heavenly Crossroads (1992)
