= Samira Makhmalbaf =

Iranian filmmaker (born 1980)

- سمیرا مخملباف
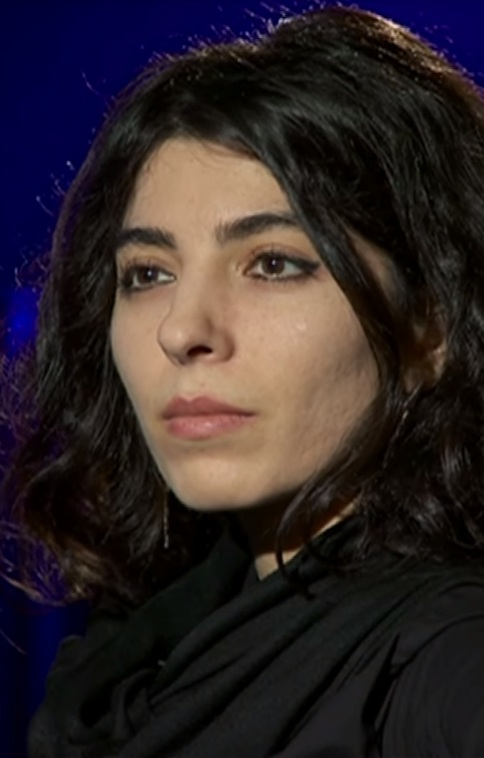
- Makhmalbaf in 2020
- Born: 15 February 1980 (age 46); Tehran, Iran
- Education: Roehampton University
- Occupation: Filmmaker
- Years active: 1998–2008
- Parent(s): Mohsen Makhmalbaf (father); Fatemeh Meshkini (mother)
- Relatives: Hana Makhmalbaf (sister); Meysam Makhmalbaf (brother)

Samira Makhmalbaf (Persian: سمیرا مخملباف, Samira Makhmalbaaf;, born 15 February 1980) is an Iranian filmmaker and screenwriter. She is the daughter of Mohsen Makhmalbaf, the film director and writer. Samira Makhmalbaf is considered to be part of the Iranian New Wave. She has won multiple awards, including two Jury Prizes at the Cannes Film Festival, and has been nominated for numerous awards.

== Early life ==
Samira Makhmalbaf was born 15 February 1980 in Tehran to filmmaker Mohsen Makhmalbaf. She joined her father on his film sets as a child and watched him edit afterwards. In her official biography, Makhmalbaf stated that her first taste for cinema came as a 7-year-old when she played a role in her father's film The Cyclist in 1987. Makhmalbaf left high school when she was 14 years old to study cinema in the Makhmalbaf Film House for five years. At age 20, she studied Psychology and Law at Roehampton University in London.

== Career ==
At the age of 17, after directing two video productions, Makhmalbaf went on to direct her first feature film, La Pomme (The Apple). She presented La Pomme at the Cannes Film Festival. In an interview at the London Film Festival in 1998, Samira Makhmalbaf stated that she felt that The Apple owed its existence to the new circumstances and changed atmosphere in Iran due to the Khatami presidency. The Apple was invited to more than 100 international film festivals in two years, and going on to the screen in more than 30 countries. In 2000 she was a member of the jury at the 22nd Moscow International Film Festival.

Makhmalbaf has been the winner and nominee for numerous awards. She was nominated twice for Golden Palm of Cannes Film Festival for Takhté siah (Blackboards) (2001) and Panj é asr (At Five in the Afternoon) (2003). She won Prix du Jury of Cannes for both films in 2001 and 2003, respectively. Samira Mohmalbaf also won the Sutherland Trophy at the London Film Festival for The Apple in 1998 and the UNESCO Award at the Venice Film Festival in 2002 for 11'09"01 September 11. In 2003, a panel of critics at the British newspaper The Guardian named Makhmalbaf among the forty best directors at work today.

During the production of Asbe du-pa (Two Legged Horse), Makhmalbaf and her cast and crew suffered an attack while filming in Afghanistan. Production stopped when a man who infiltrated the set as an extra tossed a hand grenade from the rooftop of a local bazaar. The attack severely injured six cast members and killed a horse. In an interview, Makhmalbaf stated: "I saw little boys falling to the ground, and the whole street was full of blood... My first thought was that I wouldn't see my father anymore." Determined to carry on, Makhmalbaf completed her film and held the initial release in 2008 in France.

After completing Asbe du-pa, Makhmalbaf earned nominations at various international film festivals, ultimately winning awards at Ghent International Film Festival, San Sebastián International Film Festival and Tallinn Black Nights Film Festival.

== Style and themes ==
Makhmalbaf's films followed applied the doc-fiction hybrid aesthetic of her father's earlier work. Employing non-professional actors and street-level realism. Her films have been known to follow a theme of progress and change. As reflected in her style, she strives to portray real-world political purpose, fully committed to exposing issues such as poverty. She also tackles topics such as women's rights and education in Panj é asr (At Five in The Afternoon), which centres around a young woman in Afghanistan who sets out to pursue a more open-minded education at a non-religious school.

In an interview with Indiewire, she is asked about the relationship between metaphor and reality in her film Blackboards. She says: "The first image of the film starts with a very surreal image, but as you go into the film, you can feel the reality of being a fugitive. And I love this image very much, and I think it can carry different meanings. It can express social, intelligent, and poetic meaning -- so many metaphors, and yet you can go into their reality. The idea for the film came to my father's mind when I was looking for a subject to do for my next film. He gave me three or four pages, and then it was time to imagine it. But I couldn't simply imagine it. How can I sit here in Cannes and think of people living in Kurdistan? So I had to go into it and be involved in it. So I cast the actors and found my locations, and at the same time, I let the reality of the situation come in. I don't want to kill the subject, put it in front of the camera, and just shoot it as a dead subject. I let reality come into my imagination. I believe that metaphors are born from the imagination of the artist and the reality of life, making love to each other. For example, imagine over a hundred old men wanting to return to their country. This is imagination and reality. It's a reality because some older generations want to return to their country to die. This is real. But just being old men is imagination. Or just being one woman is imagination. Or carrying these whiteboards is a combination of reality and imagination. Because maybe it's possible, if you're a refugee or a teacher, what can you do except carry your blackboard and look for students? They are like street vendors, shouting, "Come, try to learn something!" In such a dire situation, everyone is poor, so nobody can learn anything. It is imagination, but it could exist."

== Personal life ==
Mohsen Makhmalbaf married Fatemeh Meshkini, who gave birth to their three children – Samira (or Zeynab, born in 1980), Meysam (or Ayyoub, born in 1981), and Hana (or Khatereh, born in 1988). Mohsen Makhmalbaf said in an interview: "When I left the political organizations and moved into radio, Fatemeh came with me. I wrote programming, and she became an announcer. When Samira was born, we'd take her to the radio station. We worked, and she was always with one of us." Fatemeh Meshkini died in an accident in 1982. Mohsen Makhmalbaf subsequently married Fatemeh Meshkini's sister, Marziyeh Meshkini.

Samira Makhmalbaf has been a great activist for women's rights almost all her life. In an interview with The Guardian, she said:

We have a lot of limitations from all the written and unwritten law. But, still, I hope, and I believe that it will get better. It started with the democratic movement. But some things don't happen consciously. I wanted to make films, I made films to say something else, but in a way, I became a kind of example. It was breaking some cliche. Another new way of thinking started. Yes, we have a lot of limitations, but these limitations made a lot of strong, different kinds of women in Iran who, if they find a chance to express themselves, have plenty of things to say. They may have found a deeper way through all these limitations.

In the same interview, she talks about politics and says, "Even if I made that kind of direct movie talking about politics, it's nothing. Nothing, because it's just talking like a journalist. You are saying something superficial. The movies I make are deeper. This kind of work can live longer and deeper than that kind of journalistic work."

At Five in the Afternoon is the first feature film in a post-Taliban environment. She talked about her film to the BBC: "I wanted to show reality, not the cliches on television saying that the US went to Afghanistan and rescued the people from the Taliban, that the US did a Rambo. Though the Taliban have gone, their ideas are anchored in peoples' minds, in their traditions and culture, there is still a big difference between men and women in Afghanistan."

In an interview with the BBC, she discusses the difficulties women directors face in Iran:

Traditionally, it is in the minds of everybody that a woman cannot be a filmmaker. It is, therefore, very much harder for a woman. Also, when you live in this kind of situation, there is a danger that you can start to develop a similar mindset. So the thing is to challenge this situation, and then slowly, the situation will also change in the minds of others. I very much hope that in the advent of freedom and democracy, Iran can produce many more women directors.

== Filmography ==
Film
| Year | Title | Contribution | Notes |
|---|---|---|---|
| 1998 | The Apple | Director, Writer | |
| 2000 | Blackboards | Director, Writer | |
| 2002 | 11'09"01 September 11 | Director, Writer | (segment "God, Construction and Destruction") |
| 2003 | At Five in the Afternoon | Director, Writer, Cinematographer | |
| 2008 | Two-legged Horse | Director, Producer | |

== Awards and nominations ==
| Year | Award | Category | Title | Result | Notes |
|---|---|---|---|---|---|
| 2009 | Nuremberg International Human Rights Film Festival | | | | |
| 2008 | San Sebastian Film Festival | The Special Jury Prize | | | |
| 2008 | Tallinn Black Nights Film Festival | | | | |
| 2004 | International Silver Screen Film Festival, Singapore | Youths' Cinema Award | | | |
| 2003 | International Film Festival of India | Golden Peacock | | | |
| 2003 | Cannes Film Festival | Prize of the Ecumenical Jury | At Five in the Afternoon | | |
| 2003 | Cannes Film Festival | Jury Prize | At Five in the Afternoon | Won | |
| 2000 | American Film Institute | The grand Jury prize | | | |
| 2000 | UNESCO | Special cultural Prize | | | |
| 2000 | Giffoni Film Festival | Giffoni's Mayor Prize | | | |
| 2000 | Giffoni Film Festival | François Truffaut prize | | | |
| 2000 | UNESCO | Federico Fellini Medal | | | |
| 2000 | Cannes Film Festival | Jury Prize | Blackboards | Won | |
| 1999 | Independent cinema Festival, Argentina | Audience's prize | | | |
| 1999 | Independent cinema Festival, Argentina | Critic's prize | | | |
| 1999 | Independent cinema Festival, Argentina | Jury's Special prize | | | |
| 1998 | São Paulo Film Festival | Jury's Special prize | | | |
| 1998 | Thessalonica Film Festival | Jury's Special prize | | | |
| 1998 | Locarno Film Festival | FIBRESCI jury | | | Special mention |
| 1996 | Locarno Film Festival | Official Jury | | | Special Mention |
| 1998 | London Film Festival | Sutherland Trophy | | | |
