= Enrico Gras =

Italian film director

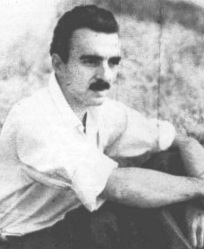
- Born: 7 March 1919; Genoa, Italy
- Died: 5 March 1981 (aged 61); Rome, Italy
- Occupations: Film director Screenwriter
- Years active: 1941-1961

Enrico Gras (7 March 1919 – 5 March 1981) was an Italian film director and screenwriter. He directed 22 films between 1941 and 1961.

== Selected filmography ==
- Pictura: An Adventure in Art (1951)
- Lost Continent (1955)
- Dreams Die at Dawn (1961)
