= Giorgio Moser =

Italian film director

- Born: 9 October 1923; Trento, Italy
- Died: 25 September 2004 (aged 80); Rome, Italy
- Occupations: Film director Screenwriter
- Years active: 1945–2002

Giorgio Moser (9 October 1923 – 25 September 2004) was an Italian film director and screenwriter. He directed seven films between 1954 and 1996.

== Selected filmography ==
- Romulus and the Sabines (1945)
- Lost Continent (1955)
- Un reietto delle isole (based on by Joseph Conrad's novel An Outcast of the Islands) (with Maria Carta) (1980)
