= Pippo Barzizza =

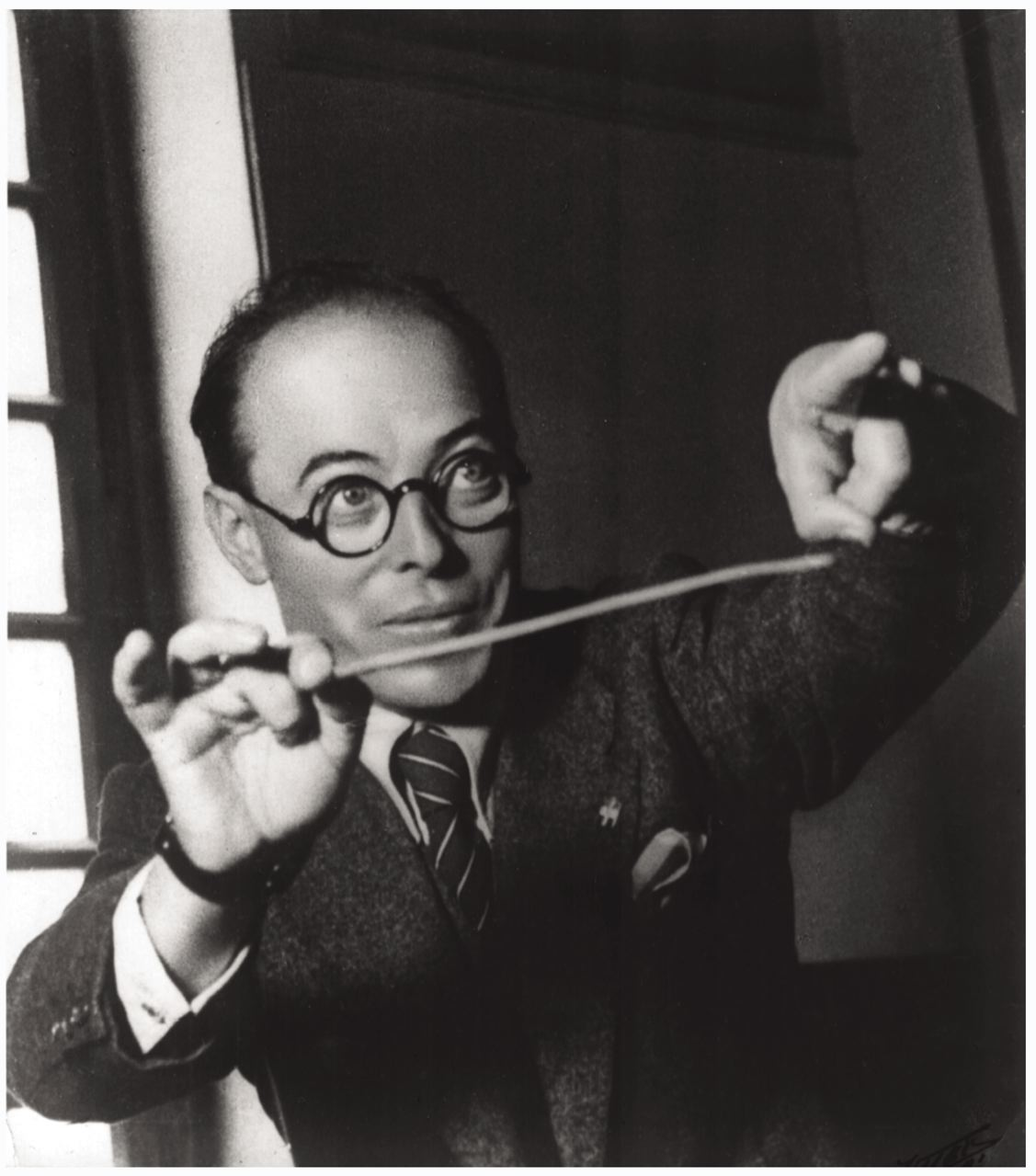
- Pippo Barzizza with his baton

Background information
- Born: 15 May 1902; Genoa, Italy
- Died: 4 April 1994 (aged 91) Sanremo, Italy
- Genres: Swing, jazz, big band
- Occupations: Composer, Arranger, Music director
- Instruments: Violin, piano, saxophone, banjo, accordion
- Years active: 1924–1960

Giuseppe "Pippo" Barzizza (Italian pronunciation: [dʒuˈzɛppe ˈpippo barˈdziddza]; 15 May 1902 – 4 April 1994) was an Italian composer, arranger, conductor and music director.

Giuseppe Barzizza, called Pippo, was born in Genova on 15 May 1902, and died in Sanremo on 4 April 1994. He became famous in the 1930s and 1940s, at the beginning with Blue Star Orchestra and then with Orchestra Cetra. He composed songs and film soundtracks. His treatise, "Barzizza's method" was printed in 1952. His basics and exercises "are so clear that's it's enough to read this little book to overcome any doubts or hesitation!” (Note: Freddy Colt) Franco Franchi said, "Barzizza was among the first to be interested in jazz music and swing and he became for many years, together with his friend and rival Cinico Angelini, a great example for his fellows, both for his extraordinary compositions and his skills to find out new talents and songs, and for his attempt to give a modern mark to Italian music".

== Biography ==
Pippo Barzizza was born in Genova, 15 May 1902, to Luigi and Fortunata Battaglieri. He was a child prodigy. At age six he entered the Camillo Sivori Institute to study violin and quickly passed the exam and took his first award. Pippo could hardly read words but he was already able to write a Mozart symphony "with nor a pale errors". (Note: This and the following expressions in quotation marks, unless otherwise stated, refer to Pippo Barzizza's notes. These notes were ordered and transcribed by his children Isa and Renzo Barzizza.)

After attending primary and secondary schools he went to Cristoforo Colombo High School, where he studied violin at the Conservatory with professor Biasoli. He listened to his father's phonographic cylinders, creating a passion for classical and symphonic music. Followed by his uncle, he often went to the Carlo Felice Theatre, where he saw, 'from a very comfortable stage position', many representations of famous lyric operas.

He became skilled in mathematics and decided to follow mathematical studies, graduating as an engineer. Strongly supported by Biasoli, he also studied Harmony, Counterpoint, Composition, and Instruments. He emphasized the piano until about 1933, followed by the violin, banjo and the trumpet section. In the same period he played at Politeama in Genova as lead violinist. In his spare time he performed music at silent movie showings at the cinema near his home.

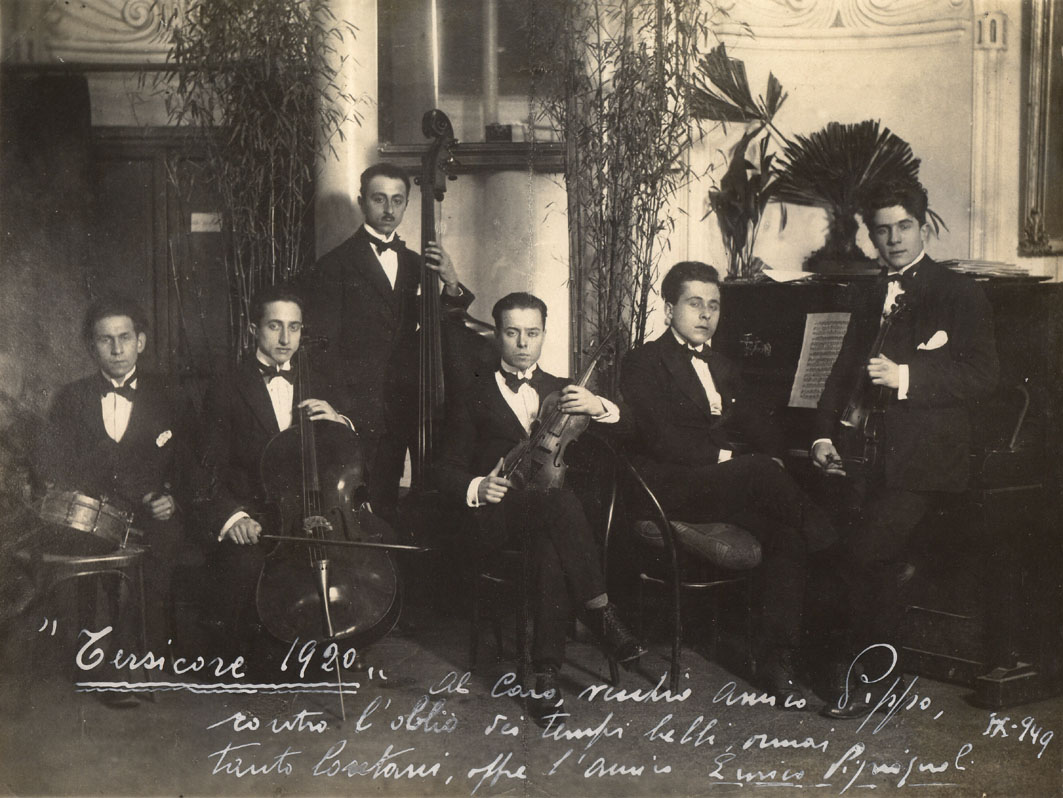
Pippo Barzizza at the center with his beloved violin. Genova, 1920.

At 17 he stopped violin studies. After listening to Yehudi Menuhin, he was demoralized and decided to pursue conducting and composition. From 17 to 21, he performed on ships and for orchestras in Genova. His first engagement was on a luxury steamer (an early cruise ship) called Esperia, but because of his youth, the captain took him on board as a passenger. In New York he first heard jazz and swing music. Pippo copied many records, sections, and he improved his skills as an arranger. In 1922 he was discovered by Armando di Piramo and joined his orchestra at Olimpia and de Ferrari in Genova. In 1923, serving in the Italian Army in Rimini, he founded a military orchestra. On 12 April 1924, he finished his service and came to Milan to play at Cova, for Di Piramo's orchestra. A few months later Philip's brothers came to Cova, with their band, the Riviera Five. Pippo taught Sid the basics as arranger, and he gave saxophone lessons, including the pizzicato technique. In Milan he performed his first recording at Pathè, near Sempione.

In 1925 he started his career as an author, first for Armando, then with Carisch and finally with Curci, where he started a long relationship. He also began working as an arranger, and in 1925 after a short period at Carminati, his first line up was for Blue Star.

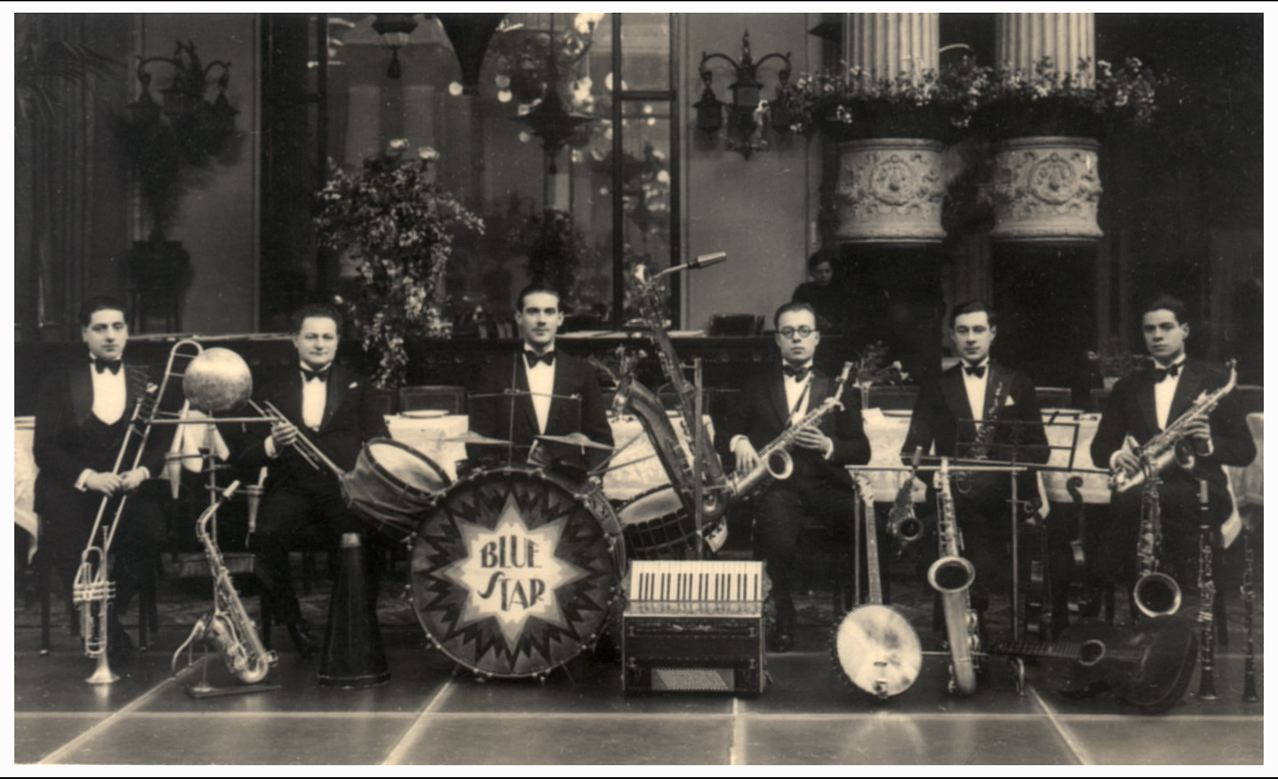
Blue Star Orchestra, 1925, the year of foundation. Barzizza on sax.

=== Blue Star ===
The Orchestra had two fixed members, Gianni Miglio and Luigi Balma, and included many others. Pippo played nine instruments and selected the members of his orchestra with a simple rule: each member must play at least three instruments, read music and play a wide list of songs from memory. The band soon held seven musicians, who played 36 instruments including the mellophone. "Pics of this time show a group of seven performers and all around a huge scenery of instruments, in one of these you can count at least 26: almost four each! It must have been an astonishing show to see them!”.

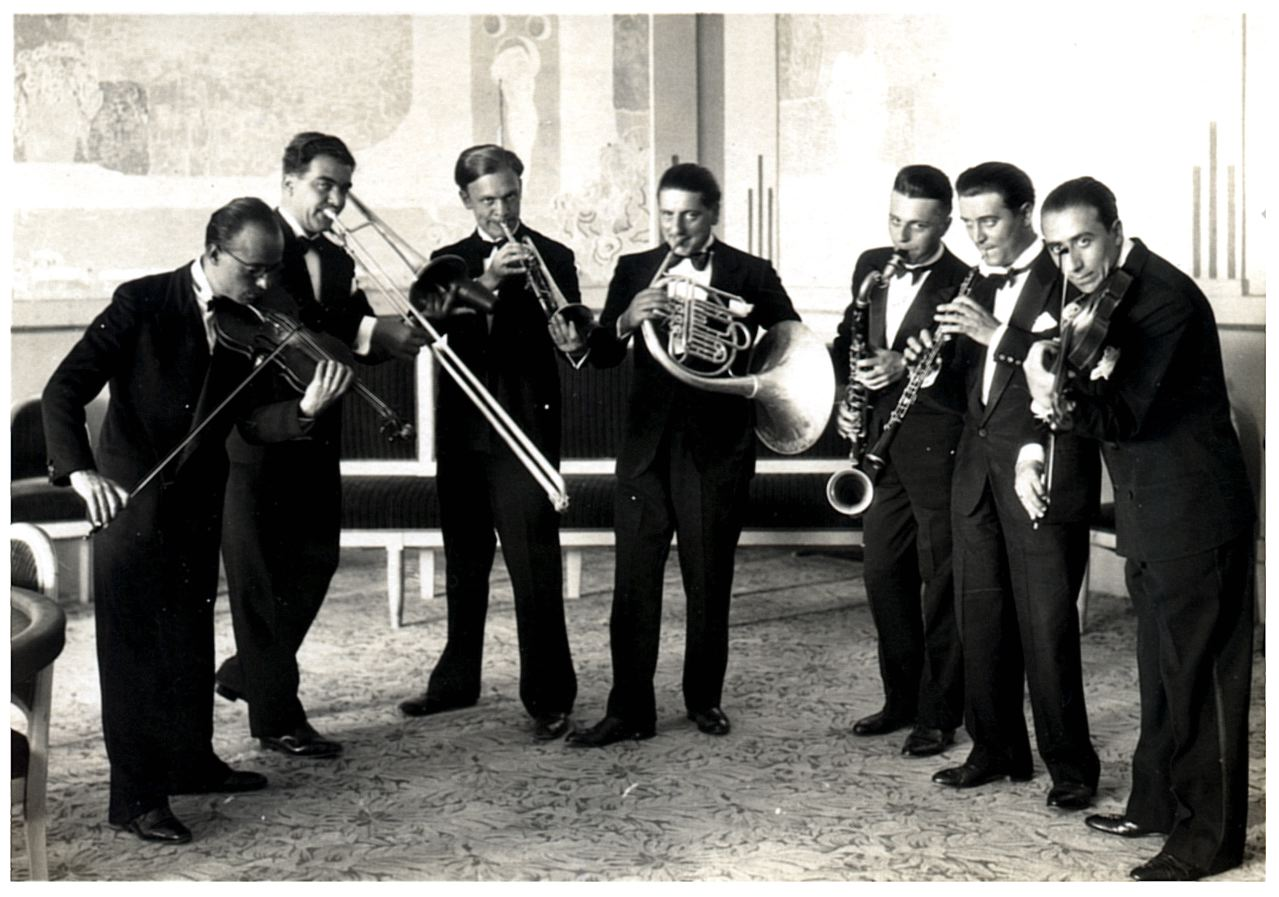
Blue Star Orchestra, 1928 or '29. Barzizza is to the left on violin.

Blue Star's debut show was 25 July, at Sempioncino; then at Cova with great success and at Olimpia; it became known as one of the greatest Italian orchestras. Thanks to Eugenio Pugliatti, Blue Star performed in France and Switzerland. They played at Casino de Cannes, at Saint Raphael, at Ciro in Paris, at Palace Hotel in Saint Moritz. Accompanied by Pugliatti, they played in Costantinople part of a financially successful tour. He purchased a flat for his parents in Pegli and a Fiat 507 Torpedo. He played in Genova at Grand'Italia. In the following years he performed in Cannes, Saint Raphael and again in Paris and Milan (at Olimpia, Cova, Birra Italia). The Blue Star Orchestra broke up in 1933.

=== Recordings ===
From 1931 to 1936 Pippo focused on making recordings. He worked with the labels Fonit, Columbia, La Voce del Padrone, Odeon, Brunswick and Fonotipia. In 1934, Carisch released Pippo Barzizza, King of Italian Jazz; and then New series of Blue Star arrangements. In 1935 he was noticed for jazz recording sessions. In 1936 he received from EIAR a proposal to conduct Cetra Orchestra in Torino. He moved there with his family.

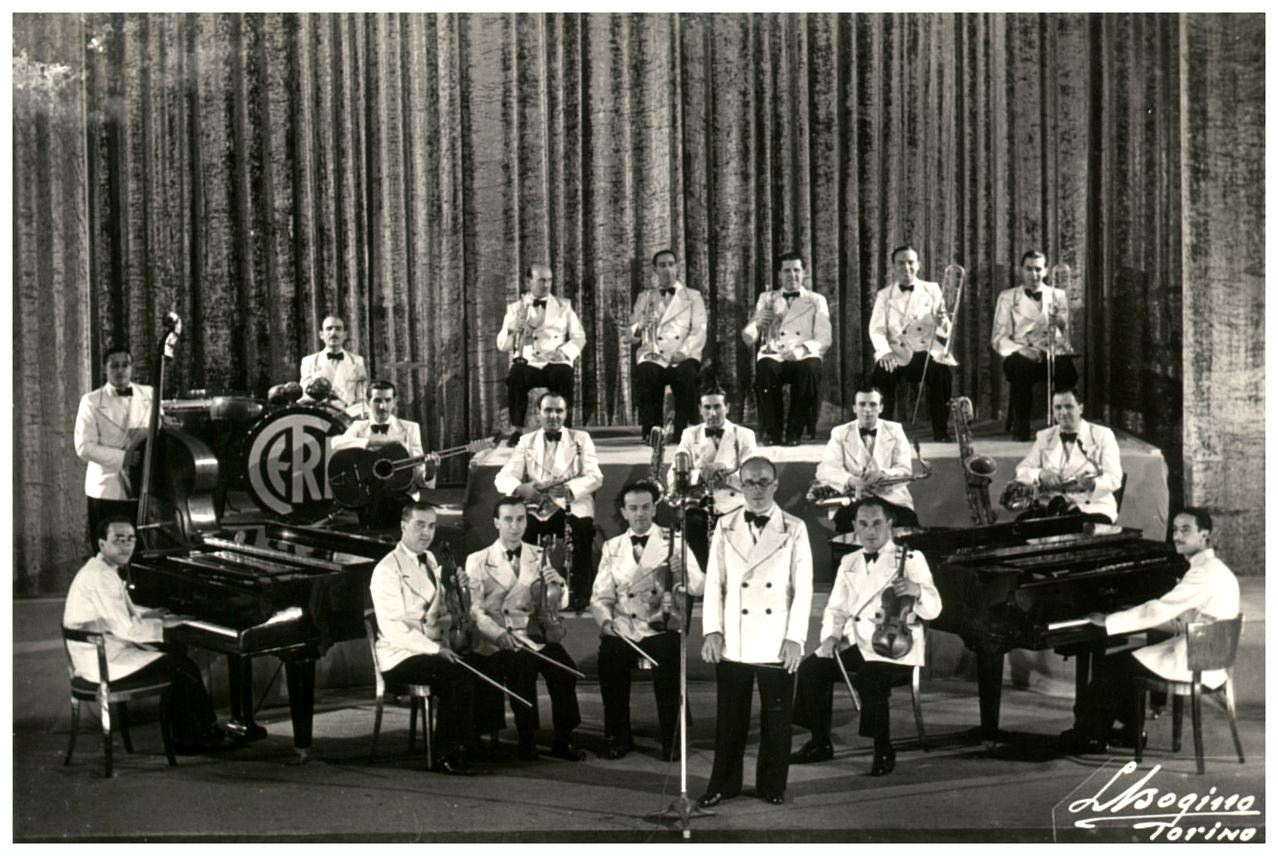
Cetra Orchestra. Late 30s. 18 members.

=== Cetra Orchestra ===
Cetra Orchestra, under Claude Bampton's direction, a good English musician and conductor, debuted with 16 musicians, growing to 28, producing "strong form and special characteristic, so to be soon considered the best among big Italian orchestras talking jazz language".

The Fascist Regime required only that he translate titles into Italian; so "In the moon" became "Con stile"; "Whoodchoppers" became "Al ballo del taglialegna". Pippo composed songs such as "Domani", "Sera", (a beautiful piece "with a harmony almost too high for that period",) and solo orchestra songs as "Do sol la si do" and his extraordinary "Adagio". On 8 December 1942, during World War II EIAR headquarter was bombed, causing serious damage. The Orchestra moved to Firenze, where it performed on the radio for the following year. They returned to Torino at the end of 1943, partially formed and broadcasting at EIAR, which at that time was garrisoned by German soldiers.

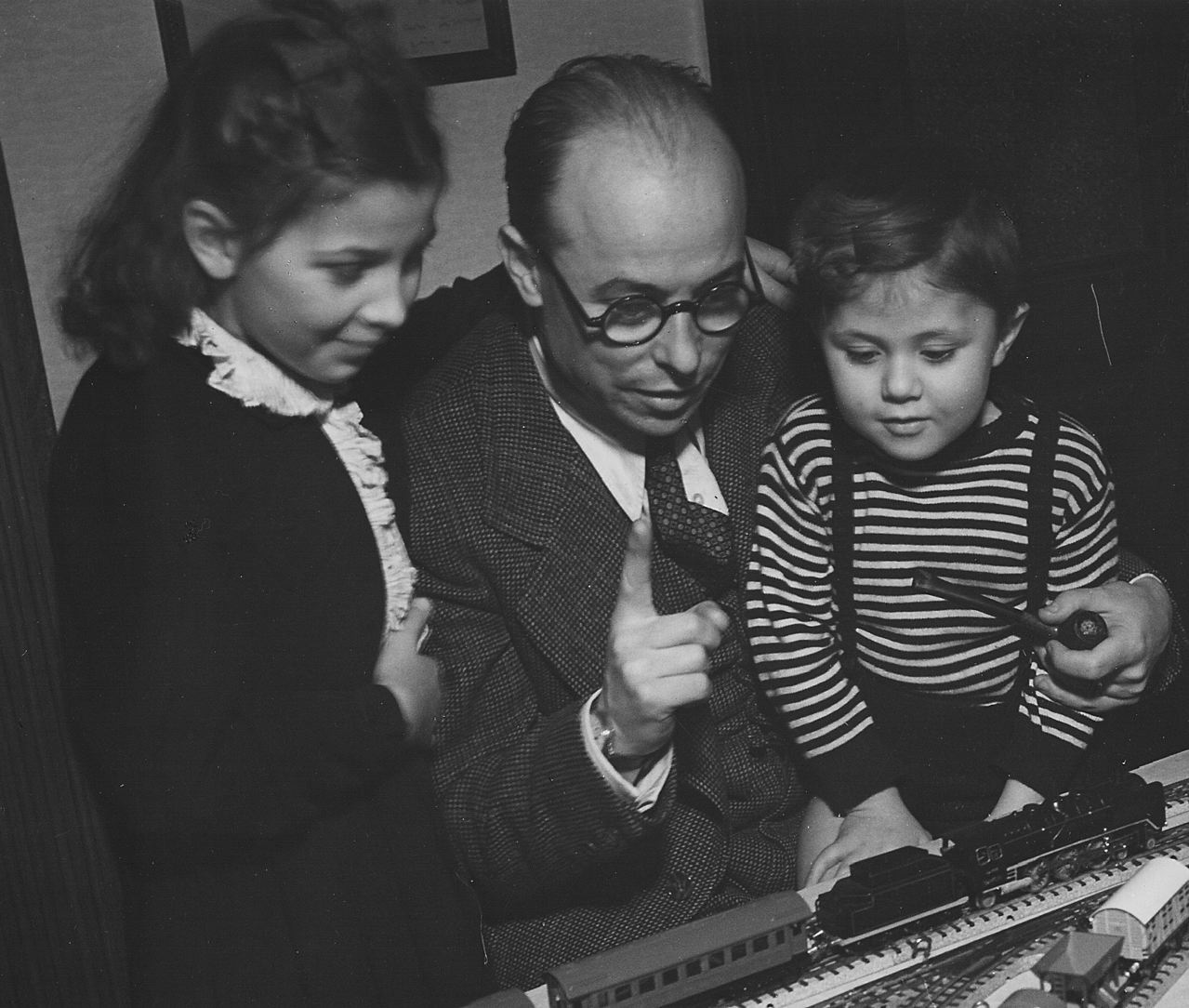
Pippo Barzizza and his children : Isa and Renzo. Torino, 1939.

=== Post-war – soundtracks and the Modern Orchestra ===
The war had little influence on their music. Notable pieces include "Il Boscaiolo" ("The Woodsman"). "Marilena", and many other members were 'removed' after the Liberation. In 1946 the Orchestra's activity increased, but never reached pre-war heights. Pippo remained highly active, performing concerts for EIAR (later RAI), and touring. In 1947 he started to compose film soundtracks. He worked in Roma (movies) and Torino (RAI). He also wrote his Barzizza, a notebook for modern classical, jazz and pop: "for me there's no pop music or serious music, for me there's only good music!”

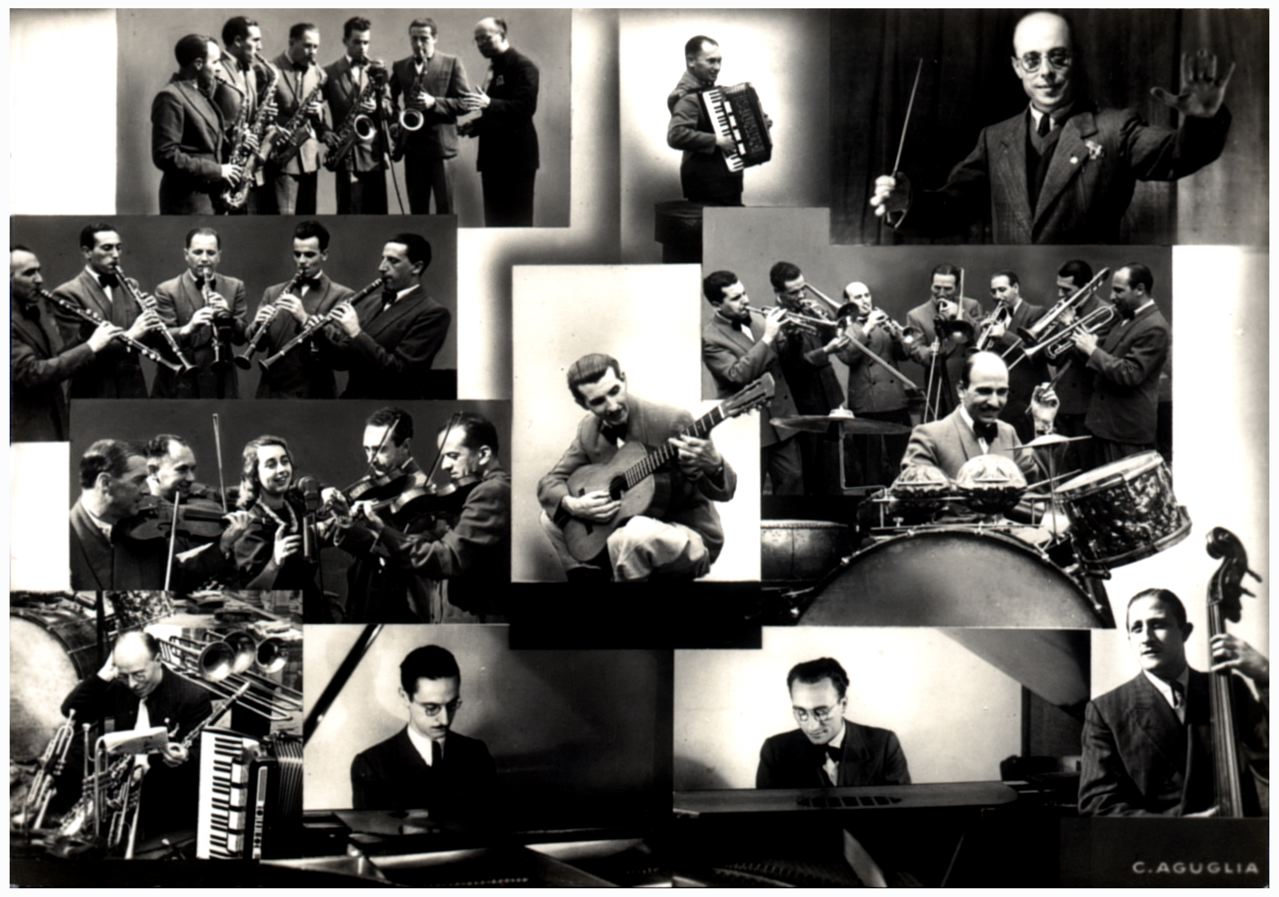
Cetra Orchestra, 40s. 27 members.

In 1948 he composed the soundtrack for Fifa e Arena with Totò and Isa. His "Paquito Lindo" set a sales record for 78 rpm sides. "Ay Nicolete" was another hit. He made many tracks with Totò, including "The Turk from Naples", "Six wives of Bluebeard", "Misery and Nobility", "Totò to Hell". With Macario, Walter Chiari, Marcello Marchesi and other actors. In 1949 he won the Silver Microphone Award as best Italian Orchestra. "The enormous discography of Cetra Orchestra with Barzizza between 1936 and the late 1948 has not rebuilt yet, because of difficulties with such a huge enterprise. Bombing of Second World War destroyed the archives of Italian labels, with original sheets. In a comment Barzizza spoke of about 3500 78 rpm discs; this means almost 7000 sides, referring to his production between 1931 and 1936.

In 1951 he moved to Rome, the Cetra Orchestra ended and he conducted The Modern Orchestra, with 50 musicians. His venues included "Red and Black", a broadcast conducted by Corrado. In those years a young Ennio Morricone worked for him.

The Modern Orchestra ended in 1954 after disputes with RAI. In 1954 Pippo moved to London and Paris to study new recording techniques. In the same year he made a short movie, The Fox, as writer, director and editor. It was shown at the Cannes Film Festival and won the third film award and the first script award.

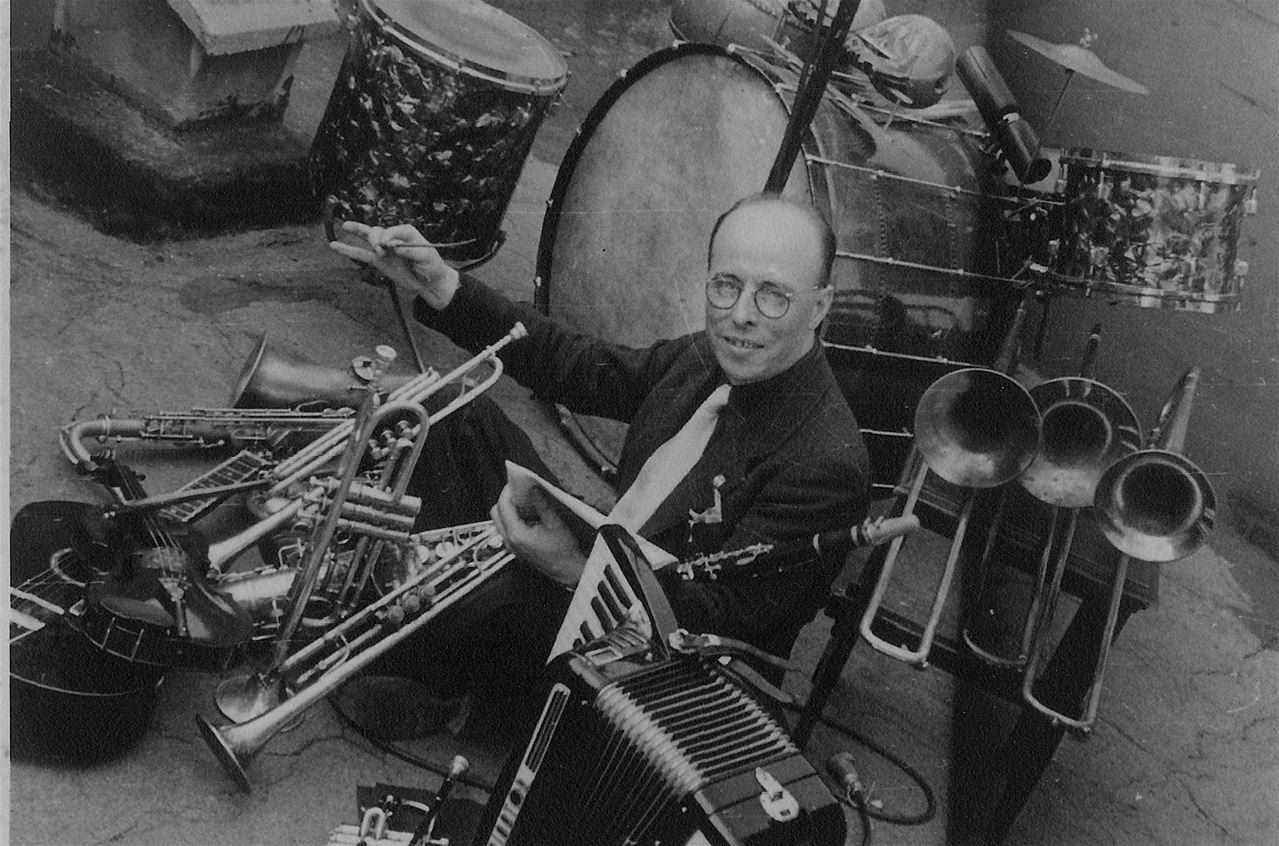
Pippo Barzizza among the instruments of his orchestra.

In 1955 he composed and arranged the Valentina soundtrack, a comedy movie written and directed by Marcello Mastroianni. The protagonist is Isa. His songs and the film were successful, in particular, "Valentina" and "Sposi in Sogno". That year he signed for Polydor and records operas at Monaco di Baviera. He won the international "The Song Award", as best Italian orchestra. Pippo attempted to leav RAI on 15 March 1955, after another dispute, but was unable to break his contract.

He moved back to Sanremo, but continued working and traveling. In 1956 he worked in Rome with a line up of 36 musicians. In 1956 Pippo produced 128 arrangements, his highest ever. On 28 February 1957, he and Angelini with other musicians were fired without explanation. "Shame!" he wrote in one of his sketches. In 1960 he performed in Rome for five months and declared this was probably the best group in which he worked. His father died 21 December 1959 while on 3 June 1960, Isa's husband, Carlo Alberto Chiesa, died in a car crash.

=== Retirement ===
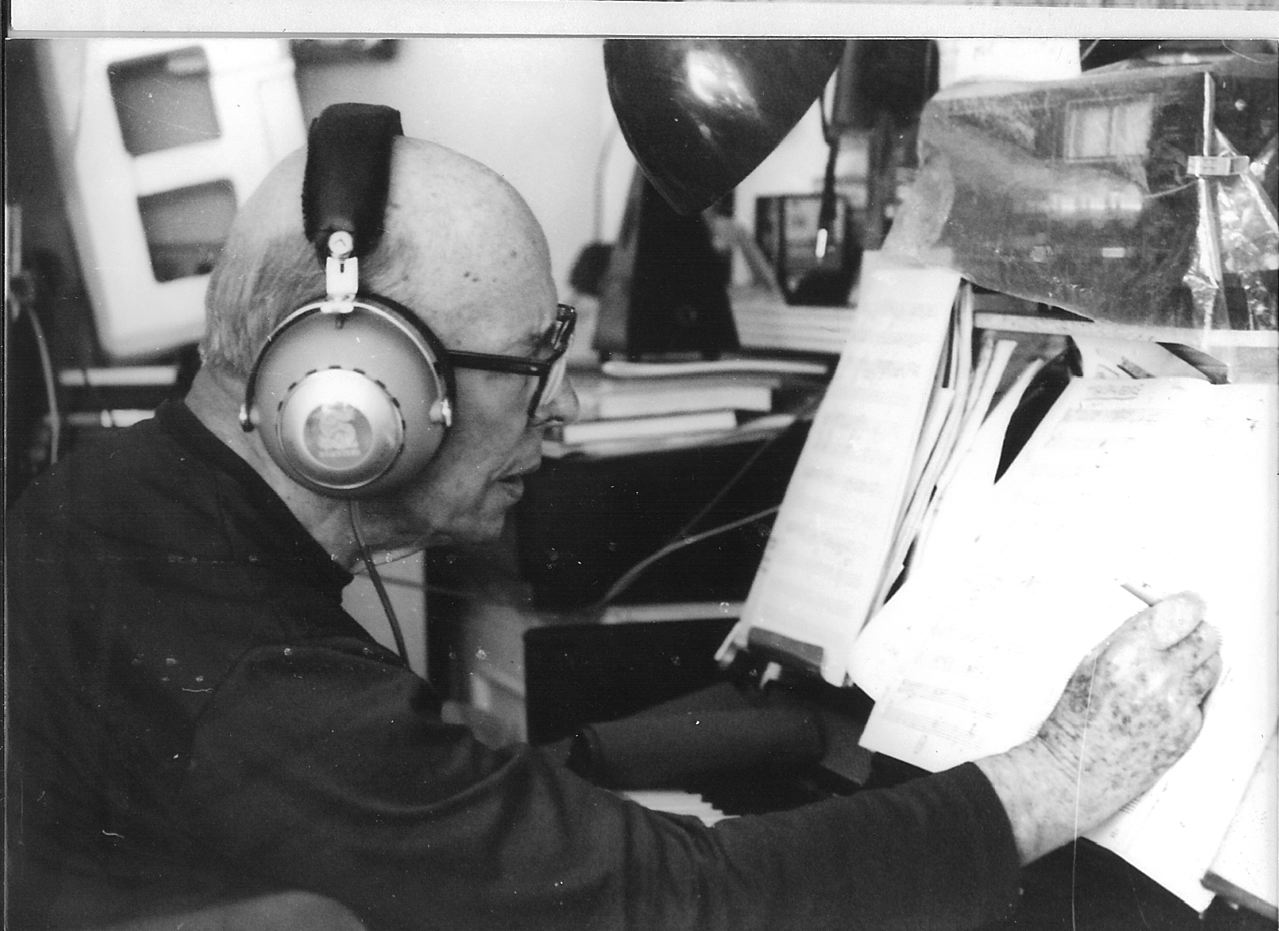
Pippo Barzizza in his studio. Sanremo, 1980s.

From the 1960s to 1994 Pippo lived in Sanremo with Tatina. After a long convalescence he returned to music, teaching in his home. His office became a recording studio, employing five multitrack mixers, eight keyboards, a drum machine and a looper. His only compositions were "Pagine d'Album" and "La Messa della Mercede" composed on request from a Franciscan friar who was his friend.

He appeared on television with Mike Bongiorno ("Flash"); in 1984 with Renzo Arbore ("Cari amici vicini e lontani") where he conducted two pieces. In the same year and for RAI's 60th birthday, in his final performance he conducted the orchestra proposing "Il boscaiolo" and "Sera".

He died at the age of 92 on 4 April 1994.

=== Award series ===
In his honor, "Centro Studi Stan Kenton" in Sanremo, instituted an award for arrangers (interrupted since 2004) whose jury was formed by Morricone. The winners were Enrico Blatti (Roma) and Stefano Zavattoni (Perugia) and in 2002 and Antonello Cpuano (Campobasso) in 2003. Arranger award recipients were Virgilio Savona, Piero Piccioni, Gianni Ferrio, Roberto Pregadic and Riz Ortolani.

== Music ==
=== Orchestras ===
==== Blue Star Orchestra ====
===== 1925 =====
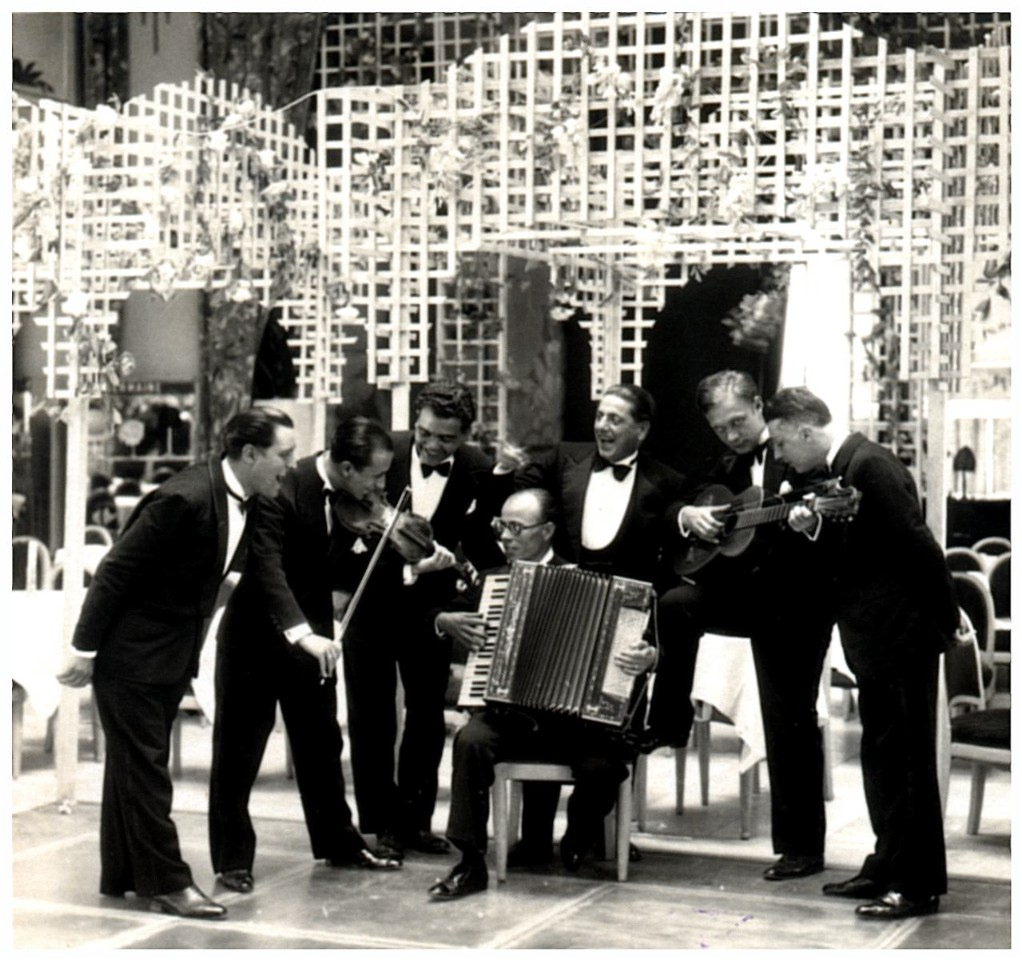
Blue Star, 1927. Barzizza is in the middle with the accordion

- Pippo Barzizza – sax, tenor, violino, pianoforte, banjo, arrangement
- Giovanni Miglio – trumpet, pianoforte, French horn
- Carlo – trumpet
- Mazza – trombone
- Gino Della Santa – violino, clarinet, sax / Giuseppe Cattafesta – sax, clarinet
- Luigi Balma – basso, drum, oboe, canto

===== 1928 =====
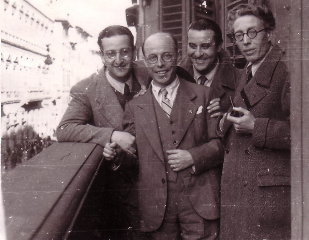
Barzizza with Pizzini, Rabagliati and Petralia. Turin, late 30s

- Pippo Barzizza – sax, tenor, violino, pianoforte, banjo, arrangement
- Potito Simone – trombone, basso
- Leo Hermann – trumpet / Giuseppe Alù – trumpet
- Giovanni Miglio – trumpet, pianoforte, French horn
- Raymond – Alto sax, clarinet
- Luigi Balma – basso, drum, sax, oboe, canto
- Alfredo Spezialetti – violino, bass saxophine, soprano sax

==== Cetra Orchestra ====
In 1936 Barzizza signed with broadcaster EIAR to conduct Cetra Orchestra, inherited by Claude Bampton. Pippo immediately substitutes some members and totally reforms the line-up and modern arrangements. In the early 1940s Cetra was considered the best among Italian jazz orchestras.

===== 1936 =====
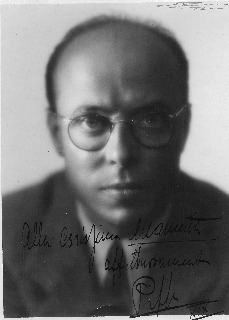
Pippo's autographed photo. 1941

- Pippo Barzizza – conductor, arrangement
- Emanuele Giudice, Claudio Pasquali, Michele Garabello – trumpet
- Luigi Mojetta, Beppe Mojetta – trombone
- Sergio Quercioli, Domenico Mancini – clarinet, sax alto
- Marcello Cianfanelli – sax tenore
- Cesare Estill – clarinet, sax baritono
- Agostino Valdambrini, Piero Filanci, Felice Abriani, Adriano La Rosa – violino
- Gino Filippini – pianoforte
- Saverio Seracini – Guitar
- Aldo Fanni – contrabbasso
- Francesco Bausi – drum

===== 1940 =====
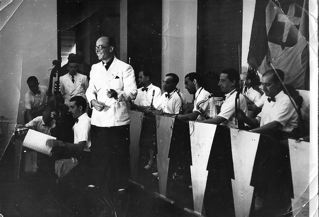
Pippo Barzizza concert in Florence. 1940

- Pippo Barzizza – conductor, arrangement
- Gaetano Gimelli, Emanuele Giudice, Claudio Pasquali, Michele Garabello – trumpet
- Luigi Mojetta, Beppe Moretta, Clinio Bergamini – trombone
- Sergio Quercioli, Domenico Mancini – clarinet, sax alto
- Tullio Tilli, Marcello Cianfanelli, Battista Gimelli – sax tenore
- Cesare Estill – clarinet, sax baritono
- Agostino Valdambrini, Piero Filanci, Felice Abriani, Adriano La Rosa – violini
- Francesco Ferrari – pianoforte, fisarmonica, arrangement
- Gino Filippini – pianoforte
- Aldo Tonini – Guitar
- Aldo Fanni – contrabbasso
- Francesco Bausi – drum

==== Other orchestras (1951–1960) ====
In 1951 Barzizza moved to Rome; the Cetra Orchestra disbanded, leading to the Modern Orchestra, with 56 members. He conducted almost fifty-four successful broadcasts, like "Rosso e Nero".

=== Singers ===
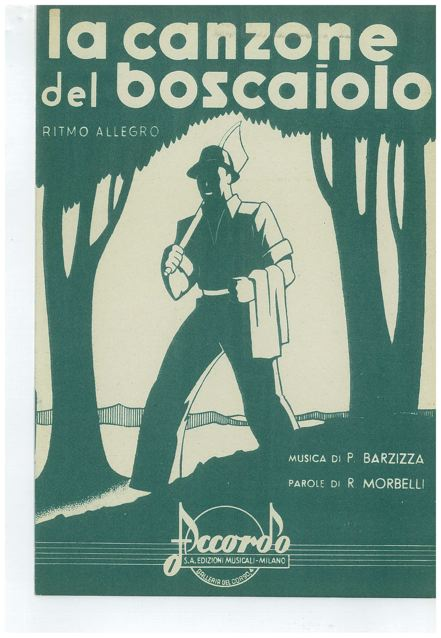
The publishing house Accordo is now part of Gruppo Editoriale Curci

- Alberto Rabagliati
- Silvana Fioresi
- Trio Lescano
- Ernesto Bonino
- Quartetto Cetra
- Aldo Donà
- I Radio Boys
- Norma Bruni
- Trio Aurora
- Lidia Martorana
- Oscar Carboni
- Dea Garbaccio
- Quartetto Stars
- Carla Boni
- Tina Allori
- Silvana Lalli

=== Orchestra performances and songs ===
In 1936 Barzizza composed and arranged a piece for orchestra: "Marilena", and it will become his theme song. It was a swing piece. Another piece was "Il boscaiolo", a happy country song made with Rabagliati and Lescanos.

- "Pagina d’album"
- "Marilena"
- "Il boscaiolo"
- "Il blues della solitudine"
- Domani"
- "Grigio è il cielo"
- "Sera"
- "Un’ora sola ti vorrei)"
- "La canzone del platano antico"
- "Ada"
- "Oggi è nato l’amore" (from movie Adamo ed Eva)
- "La canzone dei culisson" (from movie Adamo ed Eva)
- "Paquito lindo" (from movie Fear and Sand)
- "Ay Nicolete" (from movie Fear and Sand)
- "Sei venuta per me" (from movie Fear and Sand)
- "Cowboy"
- "Cielo"
- "Arrivederci ancora"
- "Sotto la pergola"
- "Come un blues"
- "L’omino dal violino"
- "Dorina"

=== Discography ===
"The enormous discography of Cetra Orchestra conducted by Barzizza between June 1936 and the end of 1948 hasn't been rebuilt yet, because of the great difficulty of such an enterprise. Bombing of Second World War destroyed the archives of Italian labels, and the originals were lost".

== Filmography ==
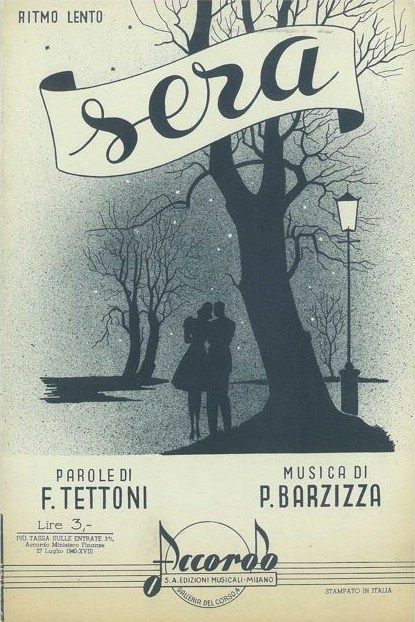
The publishing house Accordo is now part of Gruppo Editoriale Curci

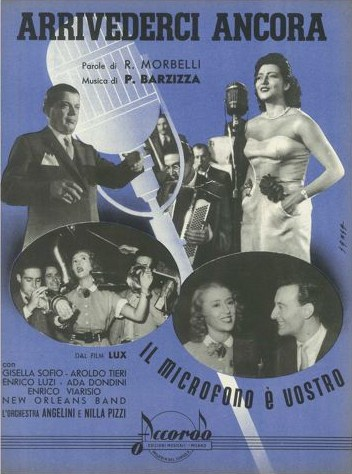
The publishing house Accordo is now part of Gruppo Editoriale Curci

- I due orfanelli (1947)
- Fear and Sand (1948)
- Adamo ed Eva (1949)
- I pompieri di Viggiù (1949)
- The Elusive Twelve (1950)
- Figaro Here, Figaro There (1950)
- Botta e risposta (1950)
- Il microfono è vostro (1951)
- Milano miliardaria (1951)
- Seven Hours of Trouble (1951)
- Anema e core (1951)
- The Reluctant Magician (1951)
- Era lui... sì! sì! (1951)
- Le sei mogli di Barbablù (1952)
- Siamo tutti inquilini (1953)
- Dieci canzoni d’amore da salvare (1953)
- Gioventù alla sbarra (1953)
- Non è mai troppo tardi (1953)
- Saluti e baci (1953)
- Un turco napoletano (1953)
- Miseria e nobiltà (1954)
- The Doctor of the Mad (1954)
- Totò all'inferno (1955)
- Il mattatore (1960)

== Publications ==
- L'Orchestrazione Moderna nella Musica Leggera, aka the "Barzizza", Curci, first edition 1952.

== Recognition ==
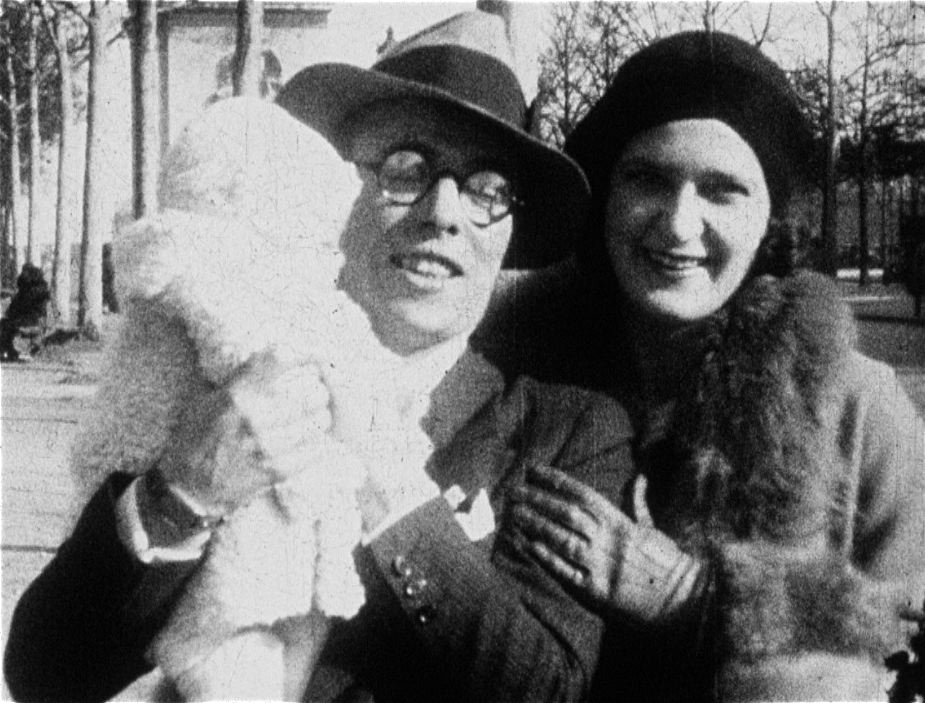
Isa, Pippo and Tatina Barzizza. Paris, 1929

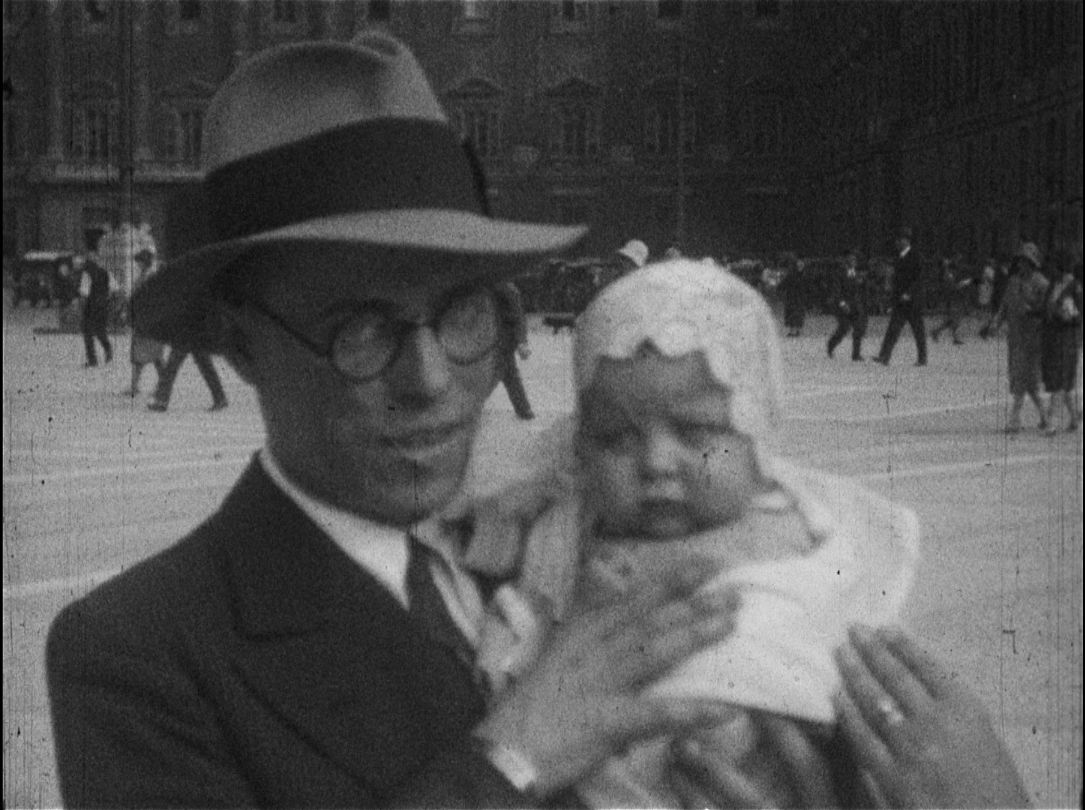
Pippo and Isa. Milan, 1930

- "Microfono d'argento" with Cetra Orchestra, 1949
- "Song Awards", with Modern Orchestra, 1955
- He was named Commander and Knight, but he preferred the title of "Maestro".
