= Eduardo Passarelli =

Italian actor

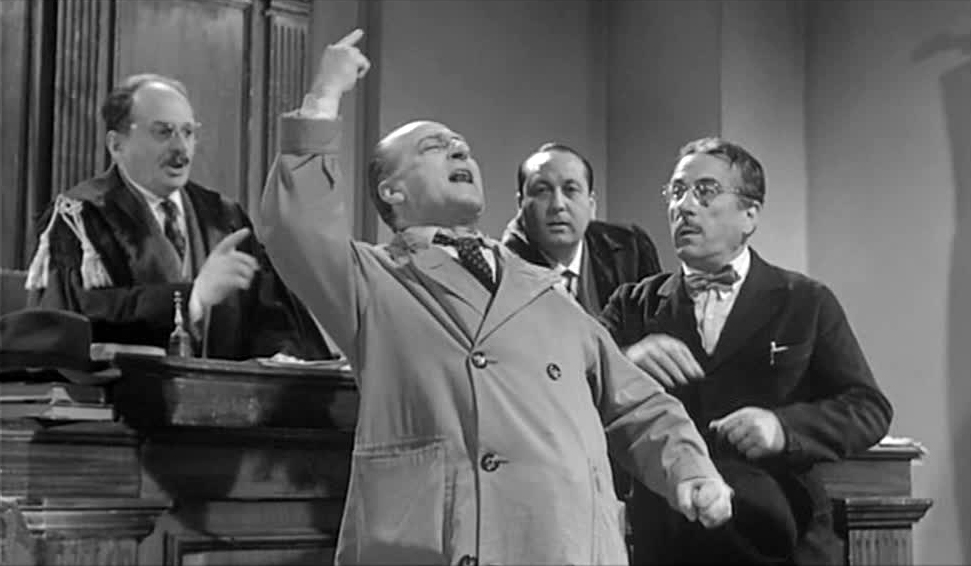
- Eduardo Passarelli on the left with Totò, Giacomo Furia and Peppino De Filippo in La cambiale (1959)
- Born: 20 July 1903; Naples, Italy
- Died: 9 December 1968 (aged 65); Naples, Italy
- Occupation: Actor
- Years active: 1937-1962

Eduardo Passarelli (20 July 1903 – 9 December 1968) was an Italian film actor. He appeared in 43 films between 1937 and 1962.

== Life and career ==
Born Eduardo De Filippo in Naples, the son of Eduardo Scarpetta, he was the brother-in-law of Eduardo, Peppino and Titina De Filippo. He started his career on stage, in which he worked very often as a sidekick of Totò, as well as with Aldo Fabrizi, Nino Taranto and Anna Proclemer. In films he was mainly active in character roles.

== Filmography ==
Year	Title	Role	Notes
1937	The Ferocious Saladin		
1937	Gli ultimi giorni di Pompeo		
1937	Gatta ci cova	Il contadino già sposato	
1938	Tonight at Eleven		Uncredited
1938	Il conte di Brechard		
1938	L'amor mio non muore!		
1939	The Marquis of Ruvolito	Tanu Conti	
1939	Lo vedi come sei... lo vedi come sei?	Il bigliettaio alla stazione	Uncredited
1940	Saint John, the Beheaded	Orazio, the lamp-lighter	
1942	After Casanova's Fashion	Un giocatore di biliardo	
1945	Rome, Open City	Neighborhood Police Sergeant	
1948	Toto Tours Italy	Carlo	
1948	Immigrants	Gennarino	
1949	The Monastery of Santa Chiara	Il prestigitatore	
1949	Napoli eterna canzone	Il professore	
1950	A Dog's Life		
1950	Songs in the Streets		
1950	Totò Tarzan	Controllore	
1950	Bluebeard's Six Wives	Impresario Pompe Funebri	
1950	Il Brigante Musolino	Nicola Rodolino	
1950	47 morto che parla	Il farmacista	
1951	Seven Hours of Trouble	Avvocato Espinaci	
1951	Il mago per forza		
1952	Toto and the King of Rome	Ennio, Maestro Esaminatore	
1952	Giovinezza	Il brigadiere	
1953	Good Folk's Sunday	Il portinaio	
1953	I Chose Love	Mario	
1953	Too Young for Love		
1953	Buon viaggio pover'uomo	Punugli	
1953	The Walk	The Teacher introducing the school performance	
1954	100 Years of Love	The Manager of the Charity Raffle	(segment "Pendolin")
1954	Neapolitan Carousel		
1954	Cento serenate		
1955	Graziella	Don Michele	Uncredited
1955	Roman Tales	Brigadiere at the Open-Air Market	Uncredited
1956	I vagabondi delle stelle		
1957	Vacanze a Ischia		
1958	È arrivata la parigina		
1958	Non sono più Guaglione	The police Commissioner	
1959	Sunset in Naples		
1959	La cambiale	The Judge	
1960	Seven in the Sun		
1960	Rocco and His Brothers		Uncredited
1960	The Two Rivals		
1960	I Teddy boys della canzone	Commissario P.S.	
1962	Il mio amico Benito	Bertolazzi	Uncredited
