= Milano miliardaria =

- Directed by: Marino Girolami; Marcello Marchesi; Vittorio Metz
- Cinematography: Tonino Delli Colli
- Music by: Giovanni D'Anzi; Pippo Barzizza
- Release date: 1951
- Country: Italy
- Language: Italian

Milano miliardaria is a 1951 Italian comedy film directed by Marino Girolami, Marcello Marchesi and Vittorio Metz.

== Cast ==
- Tino Scotti: Cavalier Luigi Pizzigoni
- Isa Barzizza: Vittoria Pizzigoni
- Franca Marzi: Italia Furioni
- Dante Maggio: Peppino Avallone
- Mario Carotenuto: Avvocato Amleto Furioni
- Aroldo Tieri: Marito geloso
- Giovanni Barrella: Comm. Fantini
- Alberto Sorrentino: Oscar, il fotografo
- Galeazzo Benti: Walter
- Marsha Gayle: Corinna
- Gipsy Kiss: Giovannina
- Vera Carmi: Paola
- Giovanni D'Anzi: Se stesso
- Sofia Loren: Commessa del bar
- Carlo Giuffrè: Tifoso coi pomodori
- Roberto Murolo: Himself
- Giuseppe Meazza: Himself
