= Albertelli =

Albertelli is an Italian surname. Notable people with the surname include:

- Luigi Albertelli (1934–2021), Italian songwriter and television author
- Mario Albertelli (1904–1966), Italian cinematographer
