= The Daughter of the Regiment (1953 film) =

Film based on the 1840 Donizetti opera

- German film poster
- Directed by: Géza von Bolváry; Goffredo Alessandrini
- Written by: Enrico Blasi; Jacques Companéez; Franz Marischka; Bruno Valeri
- Produced by: Alexander Salkind
- Starring: Antonella Lualdi; Hannelore Schroth; Isa Barzizza
- Cinematography: Tino Santoni
- Edited by: Giancarlo Cappelli
- Music by: Nino Oliviero
- Production company: Posa Film
- Distributed by: Constantin Film; Distribuzione Cinematografica Nazionale
- Release date: 4 September 1953
- Running time: 83 minutes
- Countries: West Germany; Italy
- Language: German

The Daughter of the Regiment (German: Die Tochter der Kompanie, Italian: La figlia del reggimento) is a 1953 musical comedy film directed by Géza von Bolváry and Goffredo Alessandrini and starring Antonella Lualdi, Hannelore Schroth, and Isa Barzizza. Based on the opera The Daughter of the Regiment by Gaetano Donizetti, it was made as a co-production between Italy and West Germany with separate versions released in the two languages.

The film' sets were designed by the art director Piero Filippone. It was shot at the Palatino Studios in Rome.

== Cast ==
- Antonella Lualdi as Tony (Italian version)
- Hannelore Schroth as Tony (German version)
- Isa Barzizza as Kiki
- Michel Auclair as Tenente Andrea
- Theo Lingen as Colonello
- Carlo Croccolo
- Nerio Bernardi
- Enrico Luzi
- Bianca Manenti
- Pina Gallini
- Enzo Biliotti
- Diana Robert
- Vera Carmi
- Arnaldo Mochetti
- Giulio Battiferri
- Sergio Bergonzelli
- Nadia Lorenzi
