= Giovanna Galletti =

Italian actress

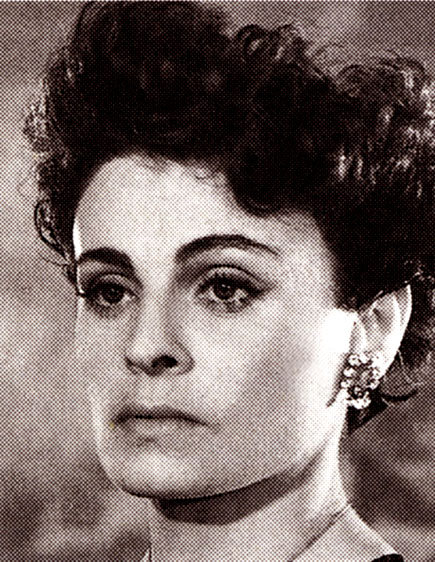
- Born: 27 June 1916; Bangkok, Thailand
- Died: 21 April 1992 (aged 75); Rome, Italy
- Occupation: Actress
- Years active: 1938–1986

Giovanna Galletti (27 June 1916 – 21 April 1992) was an Italian actress. She appeared in more than forty films from 1938 to 1986.

== Life and career ==
Galletti began her career on stage at a young age, in the early 1930s, and later attended the Centro Sperimentale di Cinematografia in Rome. In the late 1930s, she started appearing in films, mostly in supporting roles, and in 1945, she appeared in Roberto Rossellini's Rome, Open City portraying the treacherous Ingrid, which is her best known role.

After the war, she focused her activities on theatre, notably working intensively at the Piccolo Teatro of Milan under the direction of Giorgio Strehler and in the stage companies led by Luigi Cimara, Annibale Ninchi, Laura Adani, and Renzo Ricci. Her later film roles mainly consisted of villains and wicked women. She was also active on radio and television.

== Filmography ==
Year	Title	Role	Notes
1938	The Lady in White	Ginevra's Friend	Debut film
1942	Signorinette	Gymnastics Teacher	
1945	Rome, Open City	Ingrid	
1946	Felicità perduta		
1950	Margaret of Cortona	Mother of the sick child	
1950	Toto Looks for a Wife	Agent K 8	
1950	The Outlaws	Journalist	
1950	The Bread Peddler	Madame Auguste	
1950	Angelo tra la folla	Giocatrice	
1950	The Glass Castle	Louise Morel	
1950	The Knight Has Arrived!	Miss Colombo	
1951	Tomorrow Is Another Day	Mother of Luisa	
1951	Verginità	Amalia	
1951	The Ungrateful Heart	Signora Lopez	
1951	Last Meeting	Flora	
1951	Messalina	The Christian	
1952	Adorable Creatures	Director	
1952	Deceit	Marta	
1952	Three Forbidden Stories		
1954	Mambo	Valeria	Uncredited
1959	The Nun's Story		Uncredited
1960	The Loves of Hercules	The oracle	
1960	Le signore	Tatiana's Friend	
1961	The Wonders of Aladdin	Midwife	
1962	Sodom and Gomorrah	Malik	Uncredited
1966	Kill, Baby, Kill	Baroness Graps	credited as Giana Vivaldi
1966	A... For Assassin	Zia Marta Prescott	
1966	The Bible: In the Beginning...	Sinful Woman	
1968	L'età del malessere		
1968	Buona Sera, Mrs. Campbell	The Countess	
1969	The Lady of Monza	Sister Angela Sacchi	
1973	Last Tango in Paris	The Prostitute	
1974	The Girl in Room 2A	Mrs. Grant	
1979	Maschio, femmina, fiore, frutto		
1980	The Big Red One	Woman in Sicilian Village	
1985	Woman of Wonders		

== English translation of references ==
- 1. Giovanna Galletti at csfd.cz (Google translation)
