= Il microfono è vostro =

Il Microfono è vostro
- Directed by: Giuseppe Bennati
- Written by: Aldo De Benedetti
- Cinematography: Mario Albertelli; Leonida Barboni
- Music by: Pippo Barzizza
- Release date: 1951
- Country: Italy
- Language: Italian

Il Microfono è vostro is a 1951 Italian comedy film directed by Giuseppe Bennati.

== Cast ==
- Aroldo Tieri
- Gisella Sofio
- Enrico Viarisio
- Guglielmo Inglese
- Enrico Luzi
- Ada Dondini
- Mario Siletti
- Rino Salviati
- Franco Pucci
- Nilla Pizzi
- Nunzio Filogamo
- Gorni Kramer
- Cinico Angelini
- Gisella Monaldi
- Giacomo Furia
- Quartetto Cetra
