= Isa Barzizza =

Italian actress (1929–2023)

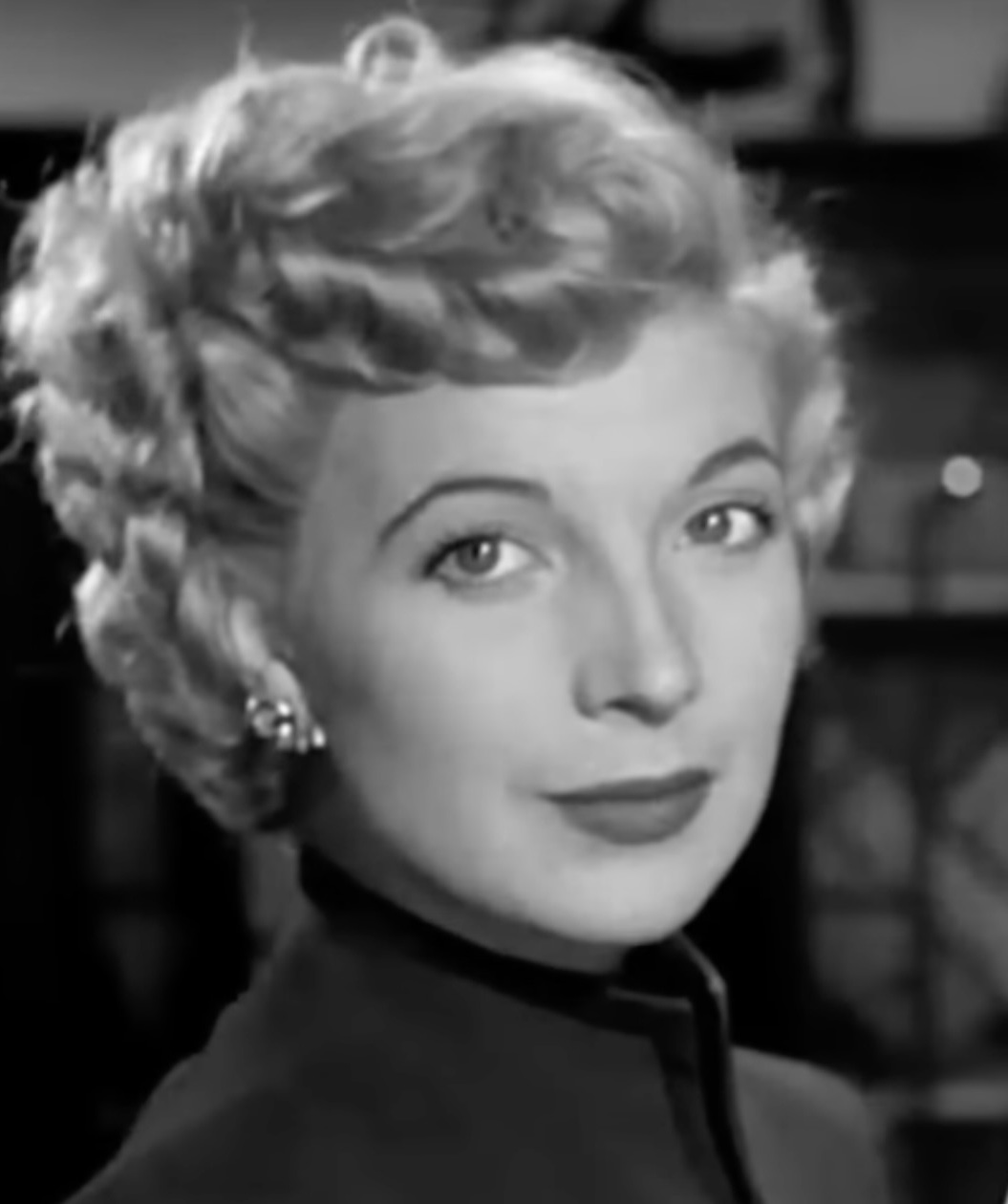
- Barzizza in the movie Era lui... sì! sì! (1951)
- Born: 22 November 1929; Sanremo, Kingdom of Italy
- Died: 28 May 2023 (aged 93); Palau, Sardinia, Italy
- Occupation: Actress

Isa Barzizza (22 November 1929 – 28 May 2023) was an Italian actress whose career spanned over 60 years.

== Life and career ==
=== Early life ===
Born in Sanremo, Barzizza was the daughter of the conductor and composer Pippo Barzizza. She started working in amateur dramatics at very young age, and she made her professional debut while still being a high school student, notably working with the stage companies led by Ruggero Ruggeri, Elsa Merlini and by the brothers Eduardo, Peppino and Titina De Filippo.

=== Breakout and success ===
Barzizza had her breakout in 1946, when during a visit to her father she was noted by Erminio Macario who chose her for the revue Follie d'Amleto. In a few years she established herself as a star in the revue genre, working several times with Macario, Totò and Wanda Osiris. Following her stage success, Barzizza also started a busy film career in the comedic genre, often teaming with Totò. In 1955, she starred in Valentina, which is considered the first genuine stage musical comedy produced in Italy.

=== Marriage and semi-retirement ===
In 1953 Barzizza married the screenwriter and director Carlo Alberto Chiesa, and following the birth of their daughter Carlotta she retired from showbusiness. In 1960 the couple were involved in a car accident and Chiesa died shortly after under the knife. Widowed, Barzizza ran a company of dubbing and production of television series. Starting from the mid-1970s she made sporadic appearances in films and on television.

=== Death ===
Barzizza died on 28 May 2023, at the age of 93.

== Selected filmography ==
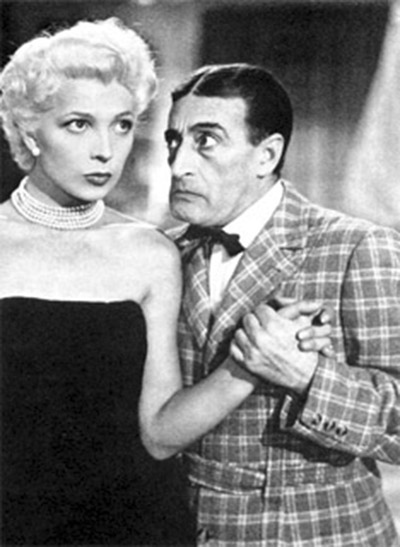
Barzizza and Totò in Bluebeard's Six Wives (1948)

- The Two Orphans (1947) - Matilde
- Dove sta Zaza? (1947) - Zazà
- Fear and Sand (1948) - Patricia Cotten
- Toto Tours Italy (1948) - Doriana
- The Firemen of Viggiù (1949) - Toto's conquest
- Adam and Eve (1949) - Eva Bianchi
- I'm in the Revue (1950) - Cleo - la kleptomane
- The Merry Widower (1950) - Lucy
- The Elusive Twelve (1950) - Teresa
- Figaro Here, Figaro There (1950) - Rosina
- Bluebeard's Six Wives (1950) - Lana Ross
- Milano miliardaria (1951) - Vittorio Pizzigoni
- Seven Hours of Trouble (1951) - Amelia
- The Reluctant Magician (1951) - Perla
- Era lui... sì! sì! (1951) - Grazia
- Porca miseria (1951) - Jenny Soleri
- Toto in Color (1952) - La signora del vagone-letto
- Five Paupers in an Automobile (1952) - Cicci
- We're Dancing on the Rainbow (1952) - Jeannette
- Primo premio: Mariarosa (1952)
- Beauties on Motor Scooters (1952) - Laura
- Gioventù alla sbarra (1953) - Florence, la canzonettista
- Siamo tutti inquilini (1953) - Collega di Anna
- It's Never Too Late (1953) - Rosanna Gennari
- The Daughter of the Regiment (1953) - Kiki
- Neapolitan Turk (1953) - Giulietta
- Viva la rivista! (1953)
- Canzoni a due voci (1953) - La fidanzata del baritono
- Gran Varietà (1954)
- Appassionatamente (1954) - Ortensia Dupré
- Toto Seeks Peace (1954) - Cousin Nella Caporali
- Cartouche (1955) - Lucilla
- Un palco all'opera (1955)
- I pinguini ci guardano (1956)
- We All Loved Each Other So Much (1974) - Elena
- Garofano rosso (1976)
- Il momento dell'avventura (1983) - Antonia Belli
- Fiori di zucca (1989) - Clelia
- Grazie al cielo c'è Totò (1991)
- 80 mq - Ottantametriquadri (1993) - Mamma di Raffaele (segment "No mamma no")
- Ardena (1997) - Lea
- Asini (1999) - Italo's mother
- Seven Kilometers from Jerusalem (2007) - Elvira Marenghi
- Una sconfinata giovinezza (2010)
- Maledimiele (2011) - Nonna
- Viva l'Italia (2012) - Marisa
- Mia (2012)
- Studio illegale (2013) - Zia Emma
- Guess Who's Coming for Christmas? (2013) - Emma
