= Bluebeard's Six Wives =

Bluebeard's Six Wives -Le sei mogli di Barbablù-
- Directed by: Carlo Ludovico Bragaglia
- Written by: Lucio Brenno; Bruno Caravagni; Agenore Incrocci; Marcello Marchesi; Vittorio Metz; Enrico Maria Ricci; Furio Scarpelli
- Starring: Totò; Isa Barzizza; Mario Castellani; Carlo Ninchi
- Cinematography: Mario Albertelli
- Edited by: Renato Cinquini
- Music by: Pippo Barzizza
- Production company: Golden Film
- Distributed by: Golden Film
- Release date: November 1950
- Running time: 87 minutes
- Country: Italy
- Language: Italian

Bluebeard's Six Wives (Italian: Le sei mogli di Barbablù) is a 1950 Italian comedy film directed by Carlo Ludovico Bragaglia, and starring Totò, Isa Barzizza and Carlo Ninchi. The film's sets were designed by the art directors Alberto Boccianti and Mario Rappini.

== Plot ==
Toto Esposito is a young lover who tries to abduct his beloved to marry her. However, Toto is wrong, and kidnaps an ugly woman named Carmela, who loves him, and chases him when Toto escapes. In a last attempt to escape by train from Carmela, Totò meets his friend Amilcare and a beautiful American journalist named Lana Ross, and offers the two a deal. Toto and Amilcare have to pretend to be detectives, who are investigating the deaths of many girls in the hands of a serial killer nicknamed "Bluebeard". Toto has to be the main dish of deception, because he has to pretend to be the boyfriend of Lana, who in the meantime is trying to fool the murderous Bluebeard, pretending to be in love with him.

== Cast ==
- Totò as Totò Esposito
- Isa Barzizza as Lana Ross
- Arturo Bragaglia as Alvaro
- Tino Buazzelli as Ladislau Zichetti / Barbablù
- Aldo Bufi Landi as Il vero Patson
- Mario Castellani as Amilcare
- Carlo Ninchi as Nick Parter
- Marcella Rovena as Silvana
- Giorgio Costantini as Giorgio
- Anna Di Lorenzo as Cameriera
- Silvia Fazi as Domenica
- Magda Forlenza as Maria
- Enzo Garinei as Paesano
- Franco Jamonte as Pecorino
- Sofia Lazzaro as Ragazza rapita
- Nino Marchesini as Ispettore
- Arnaldo Mochetti as Giuseppe
- Renato Navarrini as Renato
- Eduardo Passarelli as Impresario Pompe Funebri
- Luigi Pavese as Lucas
- Mario Pisu as Sergio
- Leonardo Bragaglia as primo fratello di Alvaro
- Leo Garavaglia as secondo fratello di Alvaro
- Giuseppe Recagno as dipendente Pompe Funebri
- Erminio Spalla as L'Autista
- Laura Tiberti as Laura

== Bibliography ==
- Moliterno, Gino. Historical Dictionary of Italian Cinema. Scarecrow Press, 2008.
