= Totò Tarzan =

1950 film

- Film poster
- Directed by: Mario Mattoli
- Written by: Agenore Incrocci; Marcello Marchesi; Vittorio Metz; Furio Scarpelli
- Produced by: Romolo Laurenti
- Starring: Totò; Marilyn Buferd; Alba Arnova
- Cinematography: Giuseppe La Torre
- Edited by: Otello Colangeli
- Music by: Armando Fragna
- Production company: Cinematografica Distributori Indipendenti
- Distributed by: Cinematografica Distributori Indipendenti
- Release date: 31 October 1950
- Running time: 85 minutes
- Country: Italy
- Language: Italian

Totò Tarzan is a 1950 Italian comedy film directed by Mario Mattoli and starring Totò, Marilyn Buferd and Alba Arnova. It is a parody of Edgar Rice Burroughs's novel Tarzan of the Apes. It was shot at the Farnesina Studios in Rome. The film's sets were designed by the art director Piero Filippone. As with Totò's other films of the era it was a commercial success, taking around 385 million lira at the box office.

== Plot ==
Antonio is a foundling who has lived for years in the Congo jungle along with the monkey Bongo. A troop of scouts finds him out. and he is brought back to civilization. Antonio learns, not without many difficulties and funny situations, the customs of other humans. He falls in love with Iva who understands he's suffering after being taken out from his habitual environment. Antonio discovers that he came from a noble family and has inherited a substantial sum of money. Cruel colleagues of Iva try to seize the money taking advantage of Antonio, but Iva tries to protect him and the two find themselves in trouble.

== Cast ==
- Totò as Antonio Della Buffas
- Marilyn Buferd as Iva
- Bianca Maria Fusari as La maestra
- Alba Arnova as Sonia
- Adriana Serra as Marta
- Luisa Poselli as Giacoma, la moglie dei procuratore generale
- Galeazzo Benti as L'esercitatore dei superparacadutisti
- Vira Silenti as Dora
- Tino Buazzelli as Spartaco
- Mario Castellani as Stanis
- Enrico Luzi as Lawyer Finotti
- Vinicio Sofia as Baron Rosen
- Luigi Pavese as Roy
- Guglielmo Barnabò as Colonel
- Nico Pepe as Lawyer Micozzi
- Carlo Croccolo as Lo sposino
- Alberto Sorrentino as Anselmo
- Giacomo Furia as Chef
- Aldo Giuffrè as Paratrooper
- Riccardo Billi as Il capostazione siciliano
- Nino Vingelli as Il capostazione napoletano
- Guglielmo Inglese as Il capostazione pugliese
- Ughetto Bertucci as Il capostazione romano
- Mario Siletti as Butler
- Sophia Loren as Tarzanide

== Bibliography ==
- Chiti, Roberto & Poppi, Roberto. Dizionario del cinema italiano: Dal 1945 al 1959. Gremese Editore, 1991.
