= Fear and Sand =

1948 film

- Film poster
- Directed by: Mario Mattoli
- Written by: Steno; Marcello Marchesi
- Produced by: Metropa Film
- Starring: Totò; Isa Barzizza
- Cinematography: Vincenzo Seratrice
- Edited by: Giuliana Attenni
- Music by: Pippo Barzizza
- Distributed by: Titanus Film
- Release date: 1948
- Running time: 80 minutes
- Country: Italy
- Language: Italian

Fear and Sand (Italian: Fifa e arena) is a 1948 Italian comedy film directed by Mario Mattoli and starring Totò. The title makes reference to the 1941 Hollywood film Blood and Sand and its 1908 source novel by Vicente Blasco Ibáñez, which Fear and Sand partially parodies.

== Plot ==
Nicolino is a kitchen boy who works in a small pharmacy in the country, run by a woman unbearably rude. So Nicolino really wants to leave his job, when he discovers that you are looking for a murderess with the same face to his. Nicolino so disguises himself as a woman and flees with the first plane is: leave for Sevilla. In Spain Nicolino is always found involved in misunderstandings and terrible mess because it is always considered a murderess until he runs into some people who mistake him for a famous bullfighter ready for his next battle against the bull to be held in bullfight in a few rounds. Nicolino in spite of being trained and prepared for the race and also falls in love with the beautiful Patricia, who encourages him to fight. Nicolino is wittily nicknamed "Nicolete" and is faced with the bull but it breaks down. In the hospital Nicolete prove their identity and will marry Patricia.

== Cast ==
- Totò as Nicolino Capece
- Isa Barzizza as Patricia Cotten
- Mario Castellani as Cast
- Franca Marzi as Carmen
- Giulio Marchetti as Paquito
- Cesare Polacco as Banderillero
- Vinicio Sofia as Paquito's manager
- Ada Dondini as Mrs. Adele
- Luigi Pavese as Doctor
- Galeazzo Benti as George
- Raimondo Vianello as Maître
- Alda Mangini as Lady on train
- Ughetto Bertucci as Chauffeur
- Enzo Turco as Shoeshiner's customer

== Bibliography ==
- Brunetta, Gian Piero. The History of Italian Cinema: A Guide to Italian Film from Its Origins to the Twenty-first Century. Princeton University Press, 2009.
