= Toto Tours Italy =

1948 film

- Film poster
- Directed by: Mario Mattoli
- Written by: Vittorio Metz; Marcello Marchesi
- Produced by: Lorenzo Pegoraro
- Starring: Totò; Isa Barzizza; Giuditta Rissone; Fulvia Franco
- Cinematography: Tino Santoni
- Edited by: Giuliana Attenni
- Music by: Nino Rota
- Production company: ENIC
- Distributed by: ENIC
- Release date: 30 December 1948
- Running time: 88 minutes
- Country: Italy
- Language: Italian

Toto Tours Italy (Italian: Totò al giro d'Italia) is a 1948 Italian comedy film directed by Mario Mattoli and starring Totò. Location shooting took place around Italy including in Bologna and Milan. The film's sets were designed by the art director Piero Filippone.

The film features cameos of famous cyclists and other sportsmen of the time: Fausto Coppi, Gino Bartali, Fiorenzo Magni, Ferdi Kubler, Giordano Cottur, Gianni Ortelli, Oreste Conte, Adolfo Consolini, Louison Bobet, Briek Schotte, Amos Matteucci, Jean-Pierre Wimille, Ulisse Lorenzetti, Di Segni, Amadeo Deiana, Aldo Spoldi, Giuseppe Tosi, Camillo Achilli and Tazio Nuvolari.

== Plot ==
Totò Casamandrei, a middle-aged high school professor, sells his soul to the Devil to win the Giro d'Italia and impress the young Doriana, a cycling fan.

== Cast ==
- Totò as Prof. Toto' Casamandrei
- Isa Barzizza as Doriana
- Giuditta Rissone as Signora Casamandrei
- Fulvia Franco as Miss Italia
- Walter Chiari as Bruno
- Carlo Ninchi as Dante Alighieri
- Luigi Catoni as Nerone
- Mario Castellani as Renato Stella, allenatore
- Carlo Micheluzzi as Il Diavolo
- Alda Mangini as Gervasia
- Ughetto Bertucci as Armando
- Gino Bartali as himself
- Fausto Coppi as himself

== Bibliography ==
- Brunetta, Gian Piero. The History of Italian Cinema: A Guide to Italian Film from Its Origins to the Twenty-first Century. Princeton University Press, 2009.
