= Five Paupers in an Automobile =

1952 film

- Film poster
- Directed by: Mario Mattoli
- Written by: Cesare Zavattini; Mario Amendola; Aldo De Benedetti
- Starring: Eduardo De Filippo
- Cinematography: Mario Albertelli
- Edited by: Giuliana Attenni
- Release date: 1952
- Running time: 97 minutes
- Country: Italy
- Language: Italian

Five Paupers in an Automobile (Italian: Cinque poveri in automobile) is a 1952 Italian comedy film directed by Mario Mattoli and starring Eduardo De Filippo.

== Cast ==
- Eduardo De Filippo as Eduardo Moschettone
- Aldo Fabrizi as Cesare Baroni
- Titina De Filippo as Mariù Palombella
- Walter Chiari as Paolo
- Isa Barzizza as Cicci
- Hélène Rémy as Gina
- Luigi Cimara as Le placier
- Aldo Giuffrè as Padella
- Arnoldo Foà as Alfredo
- Gianni Cavalieri as Gino Pranzi
- Carlo Romano as Rodolfo
- Nando Bruno as Battista
- Mario Pisu as Titolare dell'autosalone
- Raimondo Vianello as Maggiordomo
- Alberto Talegalli as Clemente
- Alberto Sorrentino as Padre ansioso
- Enzo Garinei as Cameriere
- Mario Feliciani as Parrucchiere
- Luigi Cimara as Investito
- Giulio Calì as Stalliere
- Mario Castellani as Regista
- Silvana Jachino as La segretaria del salone auto
- Gina Mascetti as La barista
