= Seven Hours of Trouble =

- Directed by: Vittorio Metz; Marcello Marchesi
- Written by: Marcello Marchesi; Vittorio Metz; Age & Scarpelli; Eduardo Scarpetta (play); Eduardo Pasarelli
- Starring: Totò; Isa Barzizza; Carlo Campanini
- Cinematography: Rodolfo Lombardi
- Edited by: Franco Fraticelli
- Music by: Pippo Barzizza
- Production companies: Golden Film; Humanitas Films
- Distributed by: Titanus Distribuzione
- Release date: 1 November 1951
- Running time: 84 minutes
- Country: Italy
- Language: Italian

Seven Hours of Trouble (Italian: Sette ore di guai) is a 1951 Italian comedy film directed by Vittorio Metz and Marcello Marchesi and starring Totò, Isa Barzizza and Carlo Campanini.

== Plot ==
Toto De Pasquale (Toto) is the holder of a modest tailoring. The day of the baptism of his son, receives the visit of the Advocate Espinaci (Eduardo Passarelli), charge d'notice the seizure of his property because of a debt long overdue and unpaid. When the lawyer discovers that the wife of De Pasquale (Clelia Matania) is an old friend of his, he decides to postpone. Toto, to ingratiate himself further, he decides to do godfather, forgetting that he had already entrusted the task to brother Matthew (Nino Milano), incurable bully. A few minutes later Toto, the lawyer and Matthew discover that the nurse (Bice Valori) has lost the baby after a fight on the streets with her husband. Without saying anything to his wife, Toto goes to look for the child and, in order not to suspect anything to the new mother, the child does bring the Romolini, a family of distracted students living close to De Pasquale. Oblivious to the fact that the child is brought home by a friend of De Pasquale mercy, Toto, the lawyer and Matthew end up at the home of a prostitute (Isa Barzizza) and his crazy protector (Guido Celano). Later, they are led to believe that the child has been brought in the wrong country estate of Romolini. Once in the village on the estate, the three divide and Toto pulls what he believes to be his son (but it is actually the child of Romolini) to grandfather Arturo (Arturo Bragaglia), who called for help immediately denounced the kidnapping of the baby. A few minutes later, the entire town chasing the poor tailor, mistaken for a kidnapper. Toto may first lynching and then fall from the roof of a building. At the end of many vicissitudes, Toto joins lawyer and brother with the baby, but arrived at the church where the baptism was to take place, he discovers that his son was already baptized. The poor man must therefore suffer the insults of the lawyer (who threatens to sequestrargli the workshop on behalf of its customers) and the mother-in-law (who denies financial support), as well as Romolini. At the end of the film, Toto sits on the steps of the church, while everyone is running behind a tow truck on which was accidentally placed his son and the small Romolini.

== Cast ==
- Totò as Totò De Pasquale
- Carlo Campanini as signor Romolini
- Isa Barzizza as Amelia
- Giulietta Masina as figlia di Romolini
- Clelia Matania as Angelina, signora De Pasquale
- Mario Castellani as Antonino
- Eduardo Passarelli as avvocato Peppino Espinaci
- Guido Celano as Achille, marito geloso di Amelia
- Alberto Sorrentino as Raffaele
- Galeazzo Benti as Ernesto
- Arturo Bragaglia as Arturo
- Nino Milano as Matteo
- Gildo Bocci as l'ubriaco
- Gisella Monaldi as Carmela
- Bice Valori as Maddalena, la balia
- Ughetto Bertucci as Annibale
- Carlo Mazzarella as Ludovico
- Liana Del Balzo as donna Lucrezia
- Liliana Mancini as Ragazza dell'autobus

== Bibliography ==
- Goble, Alan. The Complete Index to Literary Sources in Film. Walter de Gruyter, 1999.
