= Figaro Here, Figaro There =

- Directed by: Carlo Ludovico Bragaglia
- Written by: Agenore Incrocci; Furio Scarpelli; Marcello Marchesi; Vittorio Metz; Gioachino Rossini (libretto)
- Produced by: Dino De Laurentiis; Carlo Ponti
- Starring: Totò; Isa Barzizza
- Cinematography: Mario Albertelli
- Edited by: Renato Cinquini
- Music by: Pippo Barzizza (from Gioachino Rossini's The Barber of Seville)
- Production company: Golden Film
- Distributed by: Lux Film
- Release date: 12 October 1950
- Running time: 87 minutes
- Country: Italy
- Language: Italian

Figaro Here, Figaro There (Italian: Figaro qua, Figaro là) is a 1950 Italian historical comedy film directed by Carlo Ludovico Bragaglia and starring Totò and Isa Barzizza. The title and the plot allude to The Barber of Seville. It was made at Scalera Studios in Rome. Set design was by Alberto Boccianti.

== Plot ==
The film is set in the eighteenth century. The protagonist is Figaro, the Sevillian barber, who is likely to be arrested because he operates his shop on Sundays, which is forbidden. Figaro is a friend of a nobleman who fell in love with Rosina, his friend and daughter of the governor. But Rosina's father does not agree to their marriage. One day Rosina, through her maid Dove, tells the Count that one night she is staying at the inn "of four bulls". The Count and Figaro go with a friend to the inn before they get to Rosina and her court.

Their plan is to replace the host, pose as their owners of the inn and abduct Rosina. But unfortunately not all is according to plan. Pedro, a dangerous bandit, learns that Rosina and her court must stay at the inn that night and his men raid the inn: they capture Figaro, the Count and his friend. Finally Rosina comes and is disappointed when she sees that her beloved is not there. Figaro, however, has an idea: he writes a note to tell her that the man in the white hat is Pedro. Unfortunately at that time soldiers capture Figaro and Pedro, and stop believing that it is Pedro and the plan fails. Figaro is sentenced to death by firing squad, but in the end escapes helped by the Count. Eventually, after many vicissitudes, Count marries Rosina and Figaro goes to live with them.

== Cast ==
- Totò as Figaro
- Isa Barzizza as Rosina
- Gianni Agus as Count of Almaviva
- Renato Rascel as Don Alonzo
- Guglielmo Barnabò as Don Bartolo
- Jole Fierro as Colomba
- Luigi Pavese as Pedro
- Franca Marzi as Consuelo
- Pietro Tordi as Fiorello
- Ugo Sasso as Hurtado
- Mario Siletti as the president of the court
- Mario Castellani as the actor
- Giulio Calì as the barber help

== Bibliography ==
- Ennio Bìspuri. Totò: principe clown : tutti i film di Totò. Guida Editori, 1997.
