= The Ungrateful Heart =

1951 film

- German release poster
- Directed by: Guido Brignone
- Written by: Mario Monicelli; Steno; Guido Brignone; Gaspare Cataldo; Liana Ferri; Ivo Perilli
- Produced by: Romolo Laurenti; Giulio Manenti
- Starring: Carla Del Poggio; Frank Latimore; Gabriele Ferzetti
- Cinematography: Mario Albertelli
- Edited by: Jolanda Benvenuti
- Music by: Armando Fragna
- Production company: Manenti Film
- Distributed by: Manenti Film
- Release date: 11 October 1951
- Running time: 110 minutes
- Country: Italy
- Language: Italian

The Ungrateful Heart (Neapolitan: Core 'ngrato) is a 1951 Italian melodrama film directed by Guido Brignone and starring Carla Del Poggio, Frank Latimore and Gabriele Ferzetti. It takes its name from the Neapolitan song "Core 'ngrato". It was released in West Germany in 1953.

The film's sets were designed by the art director Piero Filippone.

== Cast ==
- Carla Del Poggio as Elena Franzosi
- Frank Latimore as Enrico De Marchi
- Gabriele Ferzetti as Giorgio Suprina
- Tina Lattanzi as Elvira De Marchi - Enrico's Mother
- Stefania Monti as The Opera Singer Battistona
- Olga Solbelli as Sorella Eugenia Battistoni
- Carlo Sposito as Anselmo
- Giovanna Galletti as Signora Lopez
- Olinto Cristina
- Nino Pavese
- Delore Fambri
- Nerio Bernardi
- Franco Pastorino
- Filippo Scelzo
- Guglielmo Barnabò
- Armando Migliari
- Massimo Pianforini
- Rossana Rory as Ada
- Elvira Betrone as Suora
- Emma Baron
- Liana Del Balzo
- Ugo Attanasio
- Anita Durante
- Francesca Uberti
- Gisella Monaldi
- Carlo Simoncelli
- Paolo Modugno
- Aldo Seguna

== Bibliography ==
- Forgacs, David & Gundle, Stephen. Mass Culture and Italian Society from Fascism to the Cold War. Indiana University Press, 2007.
