= Deceit (1952 film) =

1952 film by Guido Brignone

- Film poster
- Directed by: Guido Brignone
- Written by: Guido Brignone; Bruno Corrà
- Produced by: Giulio Manenti
- Starring: Gabriele Ferzetti; Nadia Gray; Tina Lattanzi
- Cinematography: Mario Albertelli
- Edited by: Jolanda Benvenuti
- Music by: Armando Fragna
- Production company: Manenti Film
- Distributed by: Manenti Film
- Release date: 19 September 1952
- Running time: 91 minutes
- Country: Italy
- Language: Italian

Deceit (Italian: Inganno) is a 1952 Italian melodrama film directed by Guido Brignone and starring Gabriele Ferzetti, Nadia Gray and Tina Lattanzi. The film's sets were designed by the art director Piero Filippone. It was partly shot on location around Trieste.

== Plot ==
Anna is a policewoman, member of the female section of the Civil Police of the Free Territory of Trieste, she marries Andrea, a doctor with an unclear past but already during the honeymoon begins to have doubts especially after the chance meeting with a former lover of his. Back at work Anna has to investigate this adventurer who seems to be involved not only in drug trafficking but also in the white trade.

Andrea is also involved in the investigation and is suspected of complicity, for this reason Anna decides to separate. Andrea, having failed every attempt to reconcile her, wants to go abroad and also asks for help from her ex-lover but then refuses to collaborate with her precisely because he does not want his wife's suspicions to become certainties.

Meanwhile, Anna discovers she is pregnant and she would like to leave the police to form a family with Andrea but the man is killed by the mother of a girl who underwent an abortion and then died.

== Cast ==
- Gabriele Ferzetti as Andrea Vannini
- Nadia Gray as Anna Comin
- Tina Lattanzi as Ispettrice di polizia Rosasco
- Bice Valori as Giustine
- Lia Orlandini as Signora Comin
- Bianca Doria as Signora Casardi
- Wilma Pagis as Baronessa Monica d'Erlange
- Giovanna Galletti as Marta
- Mirko Ellis as Commissario Costa
- Leo Garavaglia as Matteo Casardi
- Tina Pica as Cecchia inferma
- Bruna Corrà as Silvia
- Heinz Moog as Rassuna, complice della baronessa
- Pietro Tordi as L'altro complice della baronessa
- Rosita Pisano as La signora litigiosa
- Italia Marchesini as Signora Bedini
- Carlo Giuffrè as Un corteggiatore di Giustina
- Renato Malavasi as Il cameriere dell'hotel
- Mario Castellani as Ubriaco al night-club
- Maria Zanoli as La padrona della pensione
- Mimmo Palmara as Un uomo in canottiera
- Michele Malaspina as Il sovrinntendente della polizia
- Vittorio Kramer as Tenente della finanza
- Lili Cerasoli as Luisa, la ragazza morente per aborto
- Rossana Galli as Ragazza alla festa
- Pietro Carloni as Un commissario di polizia
- Mimmo Poli as Un cliente della trattoria

== Bibliography ==
- Chiti, Roberto; Poppi, Roberto; Lancia, Enrico (1991). Dizionario del cinema italiano: Dal 1945 al 1959 (in Italian). Gremese Editore. ISBN 978-88-7605-548-5.
