= The Elusive Twelve =

1950 film

- Film poster
- Directed by: Mario Mattoli
- Written by: Alberto Alberti; Franco Bezzi; Mario Monicelli; Stefano Vanzina
- Produced by: Niccolò Theodoli
- Starring: Walter Chiari; Silvana Pampanini; Isa Barzizza
- Cinematography: Mario Albertelli; Aldo Tonti
- Edited by: Giuliana Attenni
- Music by: Pippo Barzizza
- Production company: Industrie Cinematografiche Sociali
- Distributed by: Titanus
- Release date: 3 September 1950
- Running time: 95 minutes
- Country: Italy
- Language: Italian

The Elusive Twelve (Italian: L'inafferrabile 12) is a 1950 Italian comedy film directed by Mario Mattoli and starring Walter Chiari, Silvana Pampanini and Isa Barzizza. It was shot at the Farnesina Studios of Titanus in Rome. The film's sets were designed by the art director Piero Filippone. It earned 400 million lira at the domestic box office.

== Plot ==
When his wife gives birth to twin boys, her husband sends one to the orphanage as they already have eleven children and thirteen would be unlucky. The two boys grow up completely apart, one becoming a professional footballer for Juventus and the other an employee of the state lottery. Without meeting, the two now keep accidentally crossing paths. The second man is mistaken for the first man by his girlfriend, and ends up playing in a football match in place of his twin.

== Cast ==
- Walter Chiari as Carletto Esposito\Brandoletti
- Silvana Pampanini as Clara
- Isa Barzizza as Teresa
- Carlo Campanini as Beppe
- Aroldo Tieri as Il dottor Giechi
- Marilyn Buferd as L'assistente del dott. Giechi
- Laura Gore as Carletta
- Enzo Biliotti as Cav. Federico Pallino
- Agnese Dubbini as La levatrice
- Luigi Pavese as Umberto
- Pina Gallini as La direttrice
- Yvonne Sanson as Herself

== Bibliography ==
- Chiti, Roberto & Poppi, Roberto. Dizionario del cinema italiano: Dal 1945 al 1959. Gremese Editore, 1991.
- Gundle, Stephen. Fame Amid the Ruins: Italian Film Stardom in the Age of Neorealism. Berghahn Books, 2019.
