= The Two Orphans (1947 film) =

1947 film

The Two Orphans (I due orfanelli)
- Film poster
- Directed by: Mario Mattoli
- Written by: Agenore Incrocci; Mario Mattoli; Jean-Jacques Rastier; Stefano Vanzina
- Produced by: Dino De Laurentiis; Carlo Ponti
- Starring: Totò; Carlo Campanini; Isa Barzizza
- Cinematography: Tino Santoni; Jan Stallich
- Edited by: Fernando Tropea
- Music by: Pippo Barzizza
- Production company: Excelsa Film
- Distributed by: Minerva Film
- Release date: 27 November 1947
- Running time: 90 minutes
- Country: Italy
- Language: Italian

The Two Orphans (Italian: I Due Orfanelli) is a 1947 Italian comedy film directed by Mario Mattoli and starring Totò.

== Plot ==
The story is set in Paris in the middle of the 19th century. Caspar (Totò) and the Baptist (Campanini) are two poor homeless staying in an orphanage, not knowing where to stay. One day the two orphans are called by the director to solve a very special case: Susanne, a girl from the orphanage would like to marry a rich young but his father is against it because he does not know anything about the origins of his girlfriend. So Gasparre has the bright idea to cut a lock of hair to swap it with that of Susanne and so the father of the rich man discovers that the owner of the hair is of noble origins and thus a relative. Caspar along with the Baptist enters the new family but the nobles Parisians have in mind to delete the new emperor Napoleon III of France and the two tramps are involved against their bungling. Being in the real room of the emperor, Napoleon immediately catches them and makes them stop, so Caspar and Baptist are sentenced to the guillotine. But just as the ax is about to fall on their heads, the two orphans wake up with a start: it was all a dream.

== Cast ==
- Totò as Gasparre
- Carlo Campanini as Battista
- Vera Bergman as Una collegiale
- Franca Marzi as Susanne
- Isa Barzizza as Matilde
- Nerio Bernardi as Il ducca Filippo
- Raymond Bussières as Deval
- Ada Dondini as La direttrice dell'orfanatrofio
- Luigi Almirante as Il boia di Parigi
- Dina Romano as La domestica del boia
- Galeazzo Benti as Giorgio
- Mario Castellani as Il maggiordomo
- Luigi Erminio D'Olivo as Napoleon III
