= Era lui... sì! sì! =

1951 film

Era lui... sì! sì! It's Him!... Yes! Yes!
- Directed by: Marino Girolami; Marcello Marchesi; Vittorio Metz
- Produced by: Dario Sabatello
- Edited by: Franco Fraticelli
- Music by: Nino Rota
- Release date: 1951
- Running time: 95 minutes
- Country: Italy
- Language: Italian

It's Him!... Yes! Yes! (Italian: Era lui... sì! sì!) is a 1951 Italian comedy film directed by Marino Girolami, Marcello Marchesi and Vittorio Metz. Sophia Loren was an extra in the film and appeared in the film under the name Sofia Lazzaro.

== Plot ==
Fernando (Carlo Campanini) is the owner of a large department store, but suffers from recurring worrying dreams: he seems to successfully court saucy women, but just as he is about to win them over, a youngster comes on the scene and steals them from under his nose. One day a young shy Walter (Walter Chiari) turns up at the shop in search of work, and since he is almost identical to Fernando's dream rival, the latter thinks to send him packing but after some persuasion hires him.

Meanwhile, Fernando's daughter, Grazia (Isa Barzizza), falls in love with Walter at first glance and while hiding her kinship with his boss, begins to frequent him. Walter is hired at the department store and within two days he is a general manager; but Fernando's nightmares continue and he angrily tries to kill Walter. Even Grace, seeing his father's attitude, discharges him throwing him into despair. The doctor then submits Fernando to a session of psychological therapy, from which it emerges that the cause of these nightmares is a wrong done against Walter of which Fernando is responsible: the only way to solve the problem is to recover, giving back to Walter his role as director and imploring his forgiveness.

Clearly Walter does not know what is going on. He finds himself being tossed about here and there, now rejected by everyone, then courted. In the end, exhausted, Walter tries to escape but all the staff look for him and the situation is explained to him. Fernando gives him back his place. Even the beautiful Grazia returns to her senses and decides to marry him. Now, finally, nightmares can only be a bad memory.

== Cast ==
- Walter Chiari as Walter Milani
- Isa Barzizza as Grazia
- Carlo Campanini as Comm. Fernando
- Enrico Viarisio as Sott. Furgoni
- Nyta Dover as wife of Fernando
- Fanfulla as the guardian
- Lilia Landi as Nanda
- Luigi Tosi as Rinaldo
- Guglielmo Inglese as Vannozzi
- Silvana Pampanini as herself
- Sofia Lazzaro (Sophia Loren) as an odalisque

== Versions ==
Film stills of the harem scene

In the Italian version the actresses wore bikinis.

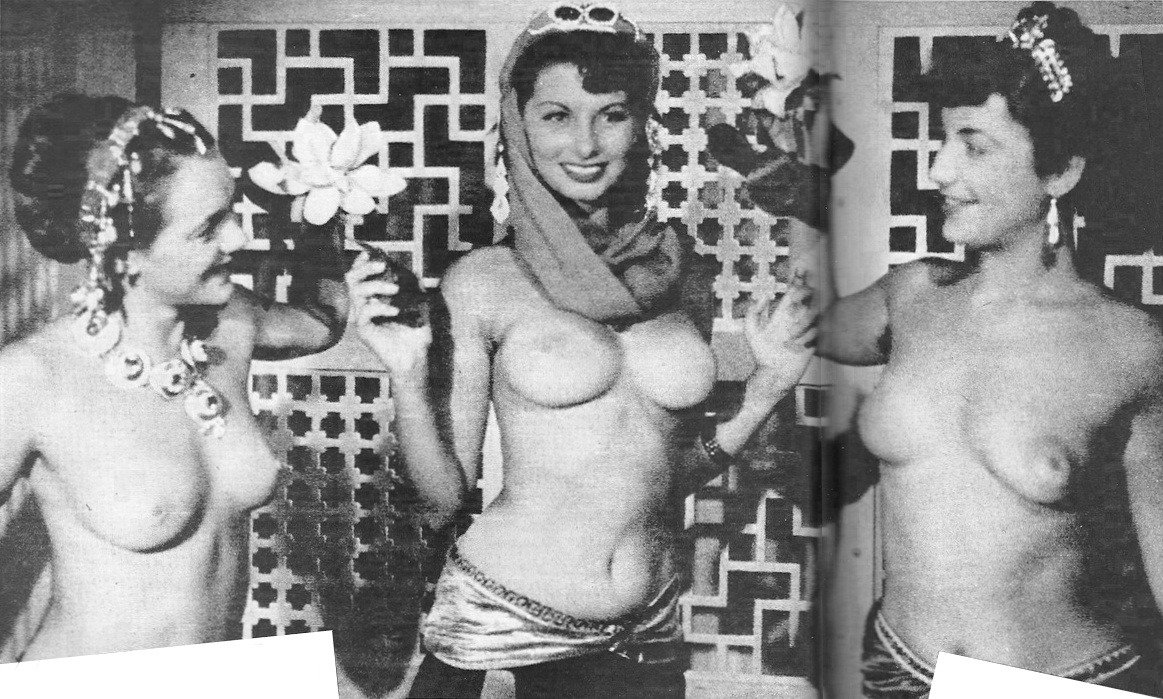
In the French version the odalisques were topless.

Loren (centre) was uncomfortable about appearing topless.

The film was filmed in two versions. There is a French version of the film (released in 1951) with more daring shots including those with the feature Sophia Loren, as an extra, who appears topless. Loren was 16 at the time of filming. During the filming of the harem scene, for the Italian version, the odalisques' breasts were covered with swimsuit tops. The director asked the actresses to put down their hands for the French version. This was to be especially for the French market, where censorship was less rigorous than in Italy.
