= Adam and Eve (1949 film) =

1949 comedy film

- Film poster
- Directed by: Mario Mattoli
- Written by: Marcello Marchesi; Vittorio Metz
- Produced by: Dino De Laurentiis
- Starring: Erminio Macario
- Cinematography: Aldo Tonti
- Edited by: Giuliana Attenni
- Music by: Pippo Barzizza
- Distributed by: Lux Film
- Release date: 29 November 1949
- Running time: 77 minutes
- Country: Italy
- Language: Italian

Adam and Eve (Italian: Adamo ed Eva) is a 1949 Italian comedy film directed by Mario Mattoli and starring Erminio Macario.

== Cast ==
- Erminio Macario as Adamo Rossi (as Macario)
- Isa Barzizza as Eva Bianchi
- Gianni Agus as Paride
- Guglielmo Barnabò as Joe
- Nerio Bernardi as Agamennone
- Riccardo Billi as Abu Hassan, l'eunuco
- Luigi Cimara as Ulisse
- Ricky Denver as Fatima (as Riki Denver)
- Grado De Franceschi as Il giocoliere cristiano
- Nunzio Filogamo as Il naufrago francese
- Giulio Marchetti as Il naufrago americano
- Guido Barbarisi as Il naufrago ebreo
- Mario Riva as Il naufrago russo
