= The Merry Widower (1950 film) =

1950 film

- Directed by: Mario Mattoli
- Written by: Aldo De Benedetti; Agenore Incrocci; Mario Mattoli; Furio Scarpelli
- Produced by: Isidoro Broggi
- Starring: Carlo Dapporto; Isa Barzizza; Amedeo Nazzari
- Cinematography: Aldo Tonti
- Edited by: Giuliana Attenni
- Music by: Felice Montagnini
- Production companies: Marina Film; Spettacoli Za Bum; Teatri della Farnesina
- Distributed by: Manenti Film
- Release date: July 1950
- Running time: 90 minutes
- Country: Italy
- Language: Italian

The Merry Widower (Italian: Il vedovo allegro) is a 1950 Italian romance film directed by Mario Mattoli and starring Carlo Dapporto, Isa Barzizza and Amedeo Nazzari. It was shot at the Farnesina Studios in Rome. The film's sets were designed by the art director Piero Filippone.

== Plot ==
Bebè, a variety artist, runs a nightclub in Cannes on the French Riviera. Unknown to both his girlfriend Lucy and the other performers, he has a young daughter living in San Remo with his grandmother. Lucy becomes suspicious due to his repeated absences, unaware that Bebè's daughter is ill and needs an expensive operation.

== Cast ==
- Carlo Dapporto as Bebè
- Isa Barzizza as Lucy
- Amedeo Nazzari as Il professore De Carlo
- Ave Ninchi as Dolores
- Irasema Dilián as Peggy
- Luigi Pavese as Il commissario dell'Interpol
- Mimma Beccari as La piccola Anna Maria
- Arnoldo Foà as Roy
- Tina De Mola as La maestrina
- Toti Dal Monte as La suocera
- Cesco Baseggio as Il suocero
- Laura Gore as La dottoressa
- Ubaldo Lay as Shaphiro
- Ughetto Bertucci as Il primo portiere del tabarin
- Mario Pisu as Il nuovo portiere del tabarin
- Aldo Silvani as Un medico anziano
- Vinicio Sofia as Un poliziotto

== Bibliography ==
- Chiti, Roberto & Poppi, Roberto. Dizionario del cinema italiano: Dal 1945 al 1959. Gremese Editore, 1991.
