= Laura Gore =

Italian actress

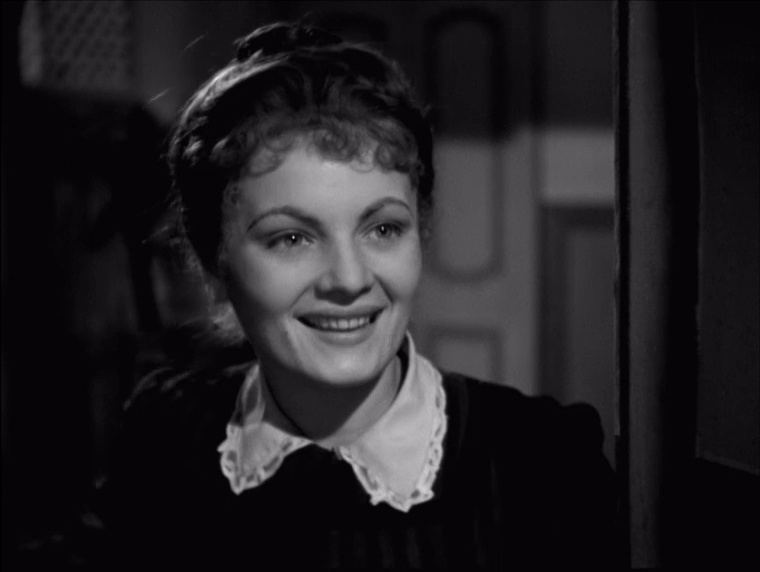
- Born: Laura Emilia Regli; 30 September 1918; Bussoleno, Turin, Kingdom of Italy
- Died: 27 March 1957 (aged 38); Rome, Italy
- Occupation: Actor
- Years active: 1945–1955

Laura Gore (born Laura Emilia Regli; 30 September 1918 – 27 March 1957) was an Italian actress and voice actress. She appeared in 39 films between 1945 and 1955.

While studying accounting, in 1940 she won the eighth edition of the amateur song contest "L'ora del dilettante" organized by EIAR at the Teatro Carlo Felice in Genoa. After that win, Gore immediately started a successful career first as a music hall artist, later as an actress of cinema, radio and theatre. For two consecutive seasons (1949–50 and 1950–51) she was a member of the stage company of Eduardo De Filippo. She was also active as a dubber in the dubbing company ORI.

Gore died of a heart attack at 38 years old. She was married to army officer Agostino Golzi.

== Partial filmography ==
- Romulus and the Sabines (1945) - Paolina
- His Young Wife (1945) - Brigida
- The Voice of Love (1946) - La cameriera della contessa
- Departure at Seven (1946) - Lucy D'Orsay
- The Ways of Sin (1946) - Carla Pinna
- Peddlin' in Society (1946) - Anna, la cameriera
- The White Primrose (1947) - Amica del Capo Banda
- Il vento m'ha cantato una canzone (1947)
- The Captain's Daughter (1947) - Palaska
- L'apocalisse (1947)
- Fabiola (1949)
- The Firemen of Viggiù (1949) - Pomponia
- The Emperor of Capri (1949) - Lucia
- The Merry Widower (1950) - La dottoressa
- The Elusive Twelve (1950) - Carletta
- Side Street Story (1950) - La moglie del ragionier Spasiani
- Toto the Sheik (1950) - Lulù
- Tomorrow Is Another Day (1951) - Linda
- Song of Spring (1951) - Maria
- Tragic Serenade (1951) - Zia di Margherita
- Stasera sciopero (1951) - Anna
- Free Escape (1951) - Rosetta
- Viva il cinema! (1952)
- Torment of the Past (1952) - La cameriera di Florette
- The Woman Who Invented Love (1952)
- La presidentessa (1952) - Sofia, la cameriera
- Ragazze da marito (1952) - Signora Rosa
- Lulu (1953) - The Venetian maid
- Neapolitans in Milan (1953) - Rosetta
- One of Those (1953) - Silvia
- Verdi, the King of Melody (1953) - Berberina Streppono
- Matrimonial Agency (1953) - Anna
- 100 Years of Love (1954) - The Snob Girl (segment "Amore 1954")
- Cose da pazzi (1954) - The Fashion Designer - Patient
- Schiava del peccato (1954) - The Maid at 'Pensione Iris'
- The Three Thieves (1954) - Doris' Friend
- Farewell, My Beautiful Lady (1954) - Clara
- I pappagalli (1955)
- Desperate Farewell (1955) - Luisa Borghi's Friend at the Hairdresser's
