= Arrivano i nostri =

1951 film

- Directed by: Mario Mattoli
- Written by: Agenore Incrocci; Marcello Marchesi; Vittorio Metz; Furio Scarpelli
- Starring: Mario Riva
- Cinematography: Mario Albertelli
- Edited by: Giuliana Attenni
- Distributed by: Compass Film
- Release date: 1951
- Running time: 112 minutes
- Country: Italy
- Language: Italian

Arrivano i nostri is a 1951 Italian comedy film directed by Mario Mattoli and written by Agenore Incrocci, Marcello Marchesi, and Vittorio Metz starring Mario Riva.

== Cast ==
- Mario Riva
- Riccardo Billi as The showman playing Carmen Miranda
- Franca Marzi as Gloria Chelli — Garlandi's lover
- Lisetta Nava as Lisetta Rapelli
- Nyta Dover as Acrobat and circus owner's wife
- Alberto Sorrentino
- Giuseppe Porelli as Baron Rapelli
- Carlo Romano as Garlandi
- Gianni Cavalieri
- Gino Cavalieri
- Guglielmo Inglese
- Franco Sportelli
- Giacomo Furia
