= The Firemen of Viggiù =

1950 film

- Film poster
- Directed by: Mario Mattoli
- Written by: Marcello Marchesi; Vittorio Metz; Mario Mattoli
- Produced by: Dino De Laurentiis
- Starring: Totò; Wanda Osiris; Carlo Dapporto; Nino Taranto
- Cinematography: Aldo Tonti
- Edited by: Giuliana Attenni
- Music by: Armando Fragna
- Distributed by: Titanus
- Release date: 16 April 1949
- Running time: 84 minutes
- Country: Italy
- Language: Italian

The Firemen of Viggiù (Italian: I pompieri di Viggiù) is a 1949 Italian comedy film directed by Mario Mattoli and starring Nino Taranto.

== Plot ==
In the village of Viggiù, the men of the local volunteer fire brigade, believing their famous song "The Firemen of Viggiù" a resounding success, organize various skits and performances in their theater, inviting all the celebrities known at that time.

Totò is a playboy who falls for the wife of a seller of textiles. The woman is calling her friend, telling her of his secret admirer, calling him "not exactly an Adonis" but feeling some kind of admiration for him. Totò brazenly enters the store and begins to woo the wife, but soon comes her husband, who is afraid to go bankrupt. Totò pretends to be a store mannequin, while the man takes his wife away. Then the husband sits to invoke the soul of the father, hoping that he can give him some advice, but suddenly loses his temper and begins to kick the mannequins, stopping before Totò. At one point, Totò moves once accidentally and the man takes it as a sign from his father and begins to talk to the mannequin. Totò then pretends to be the soul of the father, and asks for fabrics, jackets, and finally a kiss to his wife. After the sketch Totò reappears towards the end of the film where he directs the band and then concludes with the number "Fanfare of Sharpshooters".

== In other media ==
This skit is shown in the film Cinema Paradiso directed by Giuseppe Tornatore.

== Cast ==
- Nino Taranto as himself
- Totò as himself
- Wanda Osiris as herself
- Carlo Dapporto as himself
- Isa Barzizza as actress playing Totò's conquest in the revue
- Mario Castellani as actor playing the jealous husband in the revue
- Ariodante Dalla as himself
- Carlo Campanini as the leader of the firemen
- Ave Ninchi as Gaetana, his wife
- Silvana Pampanini as Fiamma, their daughter, actress in the revue
- Dante Maggio as fireman
- Carlo Croccolo as fireman
- Ughetto Bertucci as fireman
- Laura Gore as soubrette playing as Pomponia in the revue
