= I'm in the Revue =

1950 film

- Film poster
- Directed by: Mario Soldati
- Written by: Pietro Garinei; Mario Monicelli; Sandro Giovannini; Dino Maiuri; Marcello Marchesi; Stefano Vanzina
- Produced by: Dino De Laurentiis
- Starring: Nino Taranto; Isa Barzizza; Irasema Dilián
- Cinematography: Aldo Tonti
- Edited by: Douglas Robertson
- Music by: Pasquale Frustaci; Francis Lopez; Vittorio Mascheroni
- Production company: Teatri della Farnesina
- Distributed by: Cosmopolis Films; Lux Film
- Release date: 18 February 1950
- Running time: 80 minutes
- Countries: France; Italy
- Language: Italian

I'm in the Revue (French: Je suis de la revue, Italian: Botta e risposta) is a 1950 French-Italian musical comedy film directed by Mario Soldati and starring Nino Taranto, Isa Barzizza and Irasema Dilián as well as an ensemble cast of other performers. A revue film, it was shown as part of a retrospective on Italian comedy at the 67th Venice International Film Festival. It was shot at the Billancourt Studios in Paris and the Farnesina Theatre in Rome. The film's sets were designed by the art director Piero Filippone.

== Synopsis ==
Pasquele is sent by film star Suzy Delair to pick up a dress for her. However he is robbed on the train by kleptomaniac Cleo. He goes to great lengths to recover the dress.

== Cast ==
- Nino Taranto as L'Habilleur
- Isa Barzizza as Cleo, la kleptomane
- Irasema Dilián as Maria
- Louis Armstrong as Himself
- Dante Maggio as Le portier du théâtre
- Suzy Delair as La Chanteuse
- Fernandel as Le peintre en bâtiment dévot
- Katherine Dunham as Herself
- Vanda Osiris as Herself
- Renato Rascel as Himself
- Carlo Dapporto as Himself
- Andreina Paul as Une danseuse
- Enrico Viarisio as Le prestidigitateur
- Claudio Villa as Himself
- Isa Miranda as Isa
- Borrah Minevitch as Himself
- Ernesto Almirante as Le colonel
- Cozy Cole as Un musicien
- Pierre Ferval as Le bègue
- Silvio Gigli as Himself
- Bernard Hilda as Un musicien
- Earl 'Fatha' Hines as Une musicienne
- Jean London as 'Mago di Napoli'
- Velma Middleton as Une danseuse

== Bibliography ==
- Malavasi, Luca. Mario Soldati. Il castoro, 2006.
