= My Heart Sings (film) =

1951 film

- Directed by: Mario Mattoli
- Written by: Ruggero Maccari; Mario Mattoli
- Produced by: Isidoro Broggi
- Starring: Ferruccio Tagliavini
- Cinematography: Mario Albertelli
- Edited by: Leo Cattozzo
- Release date: 1951
- Running time: 86 minutes
- Country: Italy
- Language: Italian

My Heart Sings (Italian: Anema e core) is a 1951 Italian comedy film directed by Mario Mattoli and starring Ferruccio Tagliavini.

== Cast ==
- Ferruccio Tagliavini - Marco
- Franca Marzi - Gina
- Riccardo Billi - Riccardo
- Mario Riva - Mario
- Carlo Campanini - Bossoli
- Dorian Gray - Amica di Cocciaglia
- Bice Valori - Liliana
- Guglielmo Inglese - Brigadiere Bichetti
- Giorgio Bixio - Avvocato Pelletti
- Silvana Jachino - Cameriera
- Alberto Sorrentino
- Nino Manfredi - Enrico
- Margherita Autuori - Elsa
- Bruno Lanzarini - Commissario
- Vera Carmi - Madre di Enrico
- Carlo Romano - Commendator Russo
- Adriana Montuori
- Karl Ludwig Diehl - Neurologo
- Loris Gizzi - Commendator Cocciaglia
