= It's Never Too Late (1953 film) =

1953 film

- Film poster
- Directed by: Filippo Walter Ratti
- Written by: Charles Dickens; Filippo Walter Ratti; Piero Regnoli
- Based on: A Christmas Carol by Charles Dickens
- Produced by: Piero Regnoli
- Starring: Paolo Stoppa; Guglielmo Barnabò; Marcello Mastroianni
- Cinematography: Carlo Carlini
- Release date: 16 May 1953
- Running time: 86 minutes
- Country: Italy
- Language: Italian

It's Never Too Late (Italian: Non è mai troppo tardi) is a 1953 Italian comedy film directed by Filippo Walter Ratti. The film is based on the 1843 novella A Christmas Carol by Charles Dickens.

== Plot ==
Antonio Trabbi is a greedy old man with a very rough personality and obsessed by money. He deprecates charity and love and has no friends or love interest, being lonely and avoided by people. On Christmas Eve he is visited by the ghost of his former business partner, who warns him about his life-style and announces the visit of three spirits, who will show Antonio past, present and future Christmas days. During the night, the three spirits actually appear to Trabbi, showing him his sad past, the bad reputation he has with everyone and the bad outcome of his actions, which will lead him to a lonely death and to terrible punishments in Hell. When Trabbi wakes up he is greatly distressed by the visions and eager to change his life, starting with that very same Christmas Day.

== Cast ==
- Paolo Stoppa as Antonio Trabbi
- Guglielmo Barnabò
- Isa Barzizza as Rosanna Gennari
- Luigi Batzella (as Gigi Batzella)
- Sergio Bergonzelli
- Lola Braccini as Antonio's mother
- Arturo Bragaglia as L'omino
- Enzo Cerusico as Antonio as child
- Olinto Cristina as Franci
- Giorgio De Lullo as The Strange Man in the Pub
- Giulio Donnini as Orazio Colussi
- Attilio Dottesio as The man who poses the riddle at the party
- Leda Gloria as Anna Colussi
- Susanne Lévesy as Giulia - Daniele's wife
- Ellida Lorini as Rosanna as child
- Marcello Mastroianni as Riccardo
- Leonilde Montesi
- Valeria Moriconi as Marta
- Luisa Rivelli
- Daniela Spallotta
- Luigi Tosi as Daniele Trabbi

== See also ==
- List of Christmas films
- List of ghost films
- Adaptations of A Christmas Carol
