= Guglielmo Inglese =

Italian actor

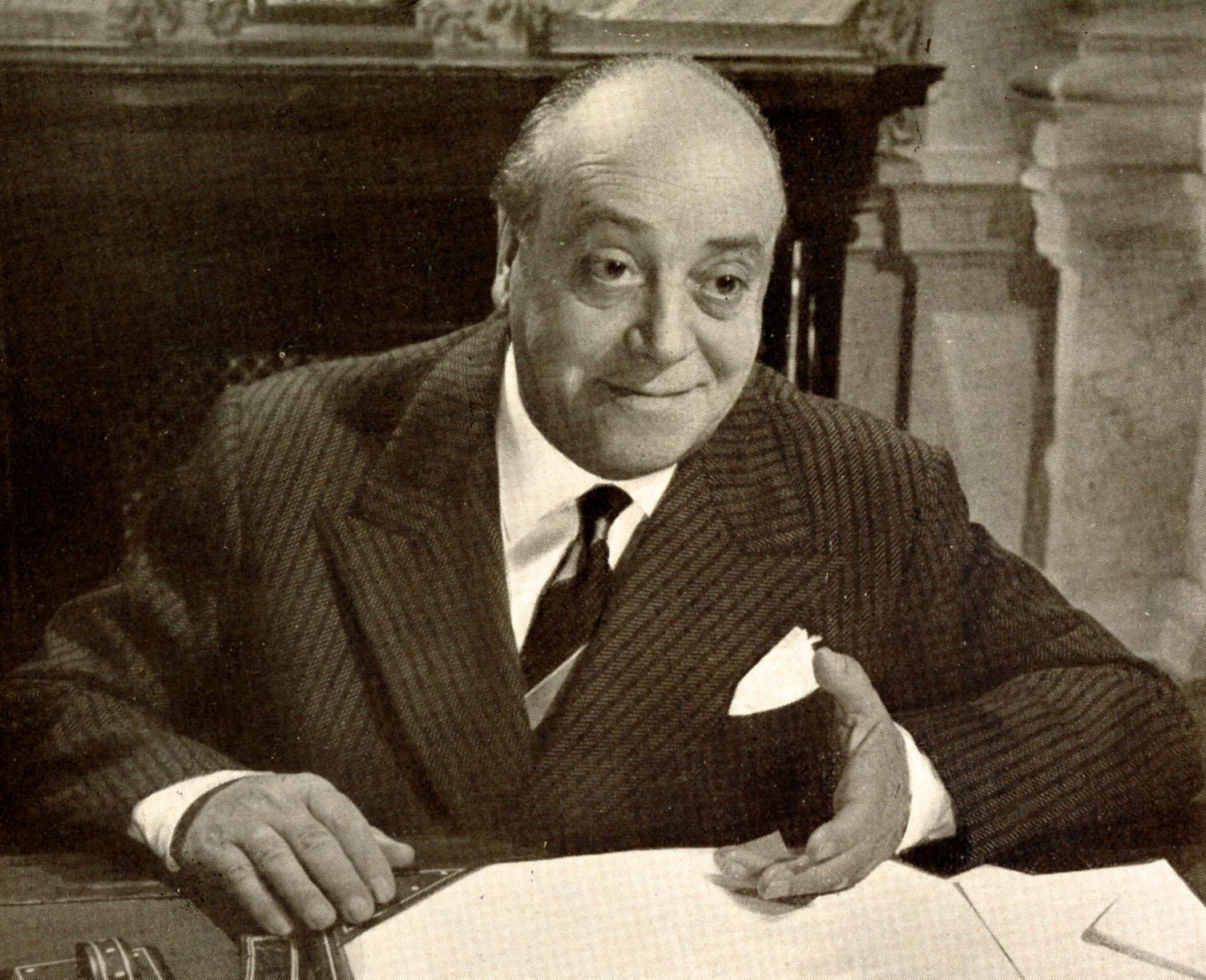
- Born: 24 November 1892; Naples, Kingdom of Italy
- Died: 14 January 1972 (aged 79); Rome, Italy

Guglielmo Inglese (24 November 1892 – 14 January 1972) was an Italian actor, radio personality and playwright.

== Life and career ==
Born in Naples into a family of Apulian origins, Inglese debuted on stage as a child actor at 2 years old, and then he was part of some of the most important stage companies of the time, including the one led by Raffaele Viviani in 1920. He abandoned the theater to devote himself to radio, with which he got a large popularity thanks to his comic monologues caricaturing typical Southern stock characters, notably the "peasant from Apulia". He made his cinema debut when he already was mature aged, in 1948, and was mostly cast in character roles in which he reprised his radio repertoire. He was often a sidekick of Totò, both in cinema and on stage. He was also author of several riviste.

== Selected filmography ==
- Totò Tarzan (1950) - Capostazione barese
- Arrivano i nostri (1951) - Brig. Vitali
- Accidents to the Taxes!! (1951) - Il capitano del Panfilo
- Toto the Third Man (1951) - Renato - il cancelliere
- Auguri e figli maschi! (1951) - Vincenzo Frunzo
- The Steamship Owner (1951) - Lo scenografo
- Era lui... sì! sì! (1951) - Vannozzi
- My Heart Sings (1951) - Brigadiere Bichetti
- Free Escape (1951)
- Viva il cinema! (1952)
- Sardinian Vendetta (1952) - Cavalier Rossetti
- Abracadabra (1952) - Nicola Caiazzo
- Torment of the Past (1952) - Giacomo
- Toto in Color (1952) - Il giardiniere
- Il romanzo della mia vita (1952) - Pasquale Curcio
- Poppy (1952) - Bidello Elia
- Non è vero... ma ci credo (1952) - The Man with a Hunchback
- I morti non pagano tasse (1952)
- Beauties on Motor Scooters (1952) - Pelacardi
- Saluti e baci (1953) - L'usciere Pellegrino (uncredited)
- Fermi tutti... arrivo io! (1953) - Proprietario 'Hotel Santiago'
- Neapolitan Turk (1953) - Carpenter of the prison (uncredited)
- Easy Years (1953) - Capo divisione
- It Happened in the Park (1953) - Il zio di Beniamino (segment: Il paraninfo)
- Naples Sings (1953) - Cavalier Fiammante
- Finalmente libero! (1953) - Judge
- Delírio (1954)
- Vacanze a Villa Igea (1954)
- Madonna delle rose (1954)
- Due soldi di felicità (1954) - don Girolamo
- Toto in Hell (1955) - Il cavalier Scartaccio
- Carovana di canzoni (1955) - Hotel manager
- Cantate con noi (1955) - Nicola
- Giuramento d'amore (1955)
- Scapricciatiello (1955) - The Customer at the barber's
- The Bigamist (1956) - Don Vincenzino
- Presentimento (1956) - Il contadino con il somaro
- Cantando sotto le stelle (1956) - Guglielmo Traversa
- Arriva la zia d'America (1956) - Guglielmo Camaramo
- Dreams in a Drawer (1957) - The Neurology Professor
- Marisa (1957) - Emilio
- Vacanze a Ischia (1957) - Cancelliere
- La zia d'America va a sciare (1957)
- Ladro lui, ladra lei (1958) - Cavalier Lauricella
- Seksdagesløbet (1958) - Peppo
- Three Strangers in Rome (1958) - Michele, Magda's wooer
- Serenatella sciuè sciuè (1958)
- Gli avventurieri dell'Uranio (1958) - Venanzio
- Arriva la banda (1959)
- Lui, lei e il nonno (1959)
- Le confident de ces dames (1959)
- Spavaldi e innamorati (1959)
- Avventura in città (1959)
