= Mario Albertelli =

Italian cinematographer

- Born: 22 January 1904 (age 122); Rome, Lazio, Kingdom of Italy
- Occupation: Cinematographer
- Years active: 1933–1956

Mario Albertelli was an Italian cinematographer.

== Selected filmography ==
- Black Shirt (1933)
- Hundred Days (1935)
- Tomb of the Angels (1937)
- 13 Men and a Gun (1938)
- Ettore Fieramosca (1938)
- The Last Enemy (1938)
- In the Country Fell a Star (1939)
- Two Million for a Smile (1939)
- Who Are You? (1939)
- Maddalena, Zero for Conduct (1940)
- Teresa Venerdì (1941)
- Idyll in Budapest (1941)
- Marco Visconti (1941)
- Rossini (1942)
- Fedora (1942)
- The Devil's Gondola (1946)
- Buried Alive (1949)
- Vertigine d'amore (1949)
- How I Discovered America (1949)
- 47 morto che parla (1950)
- The Elusive Twelve (1950)
- Figaro Here, Figaro There (1950)
- Toto Looks for a Wife (1950)
- Bluebeard's Six Wives (1950)
- Arrivano i nostri (1951)
- The Ungrateful Heart (1951)
- The Reluctant Magician (1951)
- The Black Captain (1951)
- My Heart Sings (1951)
- Il microfono è vostro (1951)
- At Sword's Edge (1952)
- The Secret of Three Points (1952)
- Red Love (1952)
- Five Paupers in an Automobile (1952)
- Sardinian Vendetta (1952)
- Deceit (1952)
- Lulu (1953)
- I Chose Love (1953)
- Frine, Courtesan of Orient (1953)
- Nero and the Burning of Rome (1953)
- Papà Pacifico (1954)
- Tragic Ballad (1954)
- Napoli piange e ride (1954)
- Peppino e la vecchia signora (1954)
- New Moon (1955)
- Toto, Peppino and the Outlaws (1956)
- Toto, Peppino, and the Hussy (1956)

== Bibliography ==
- Mitchell, Charles P. The Great Composers Portrayed on Film, 1913 through 2002. McFarland, 2004.
