= Enrico Luzi =

Italian actor

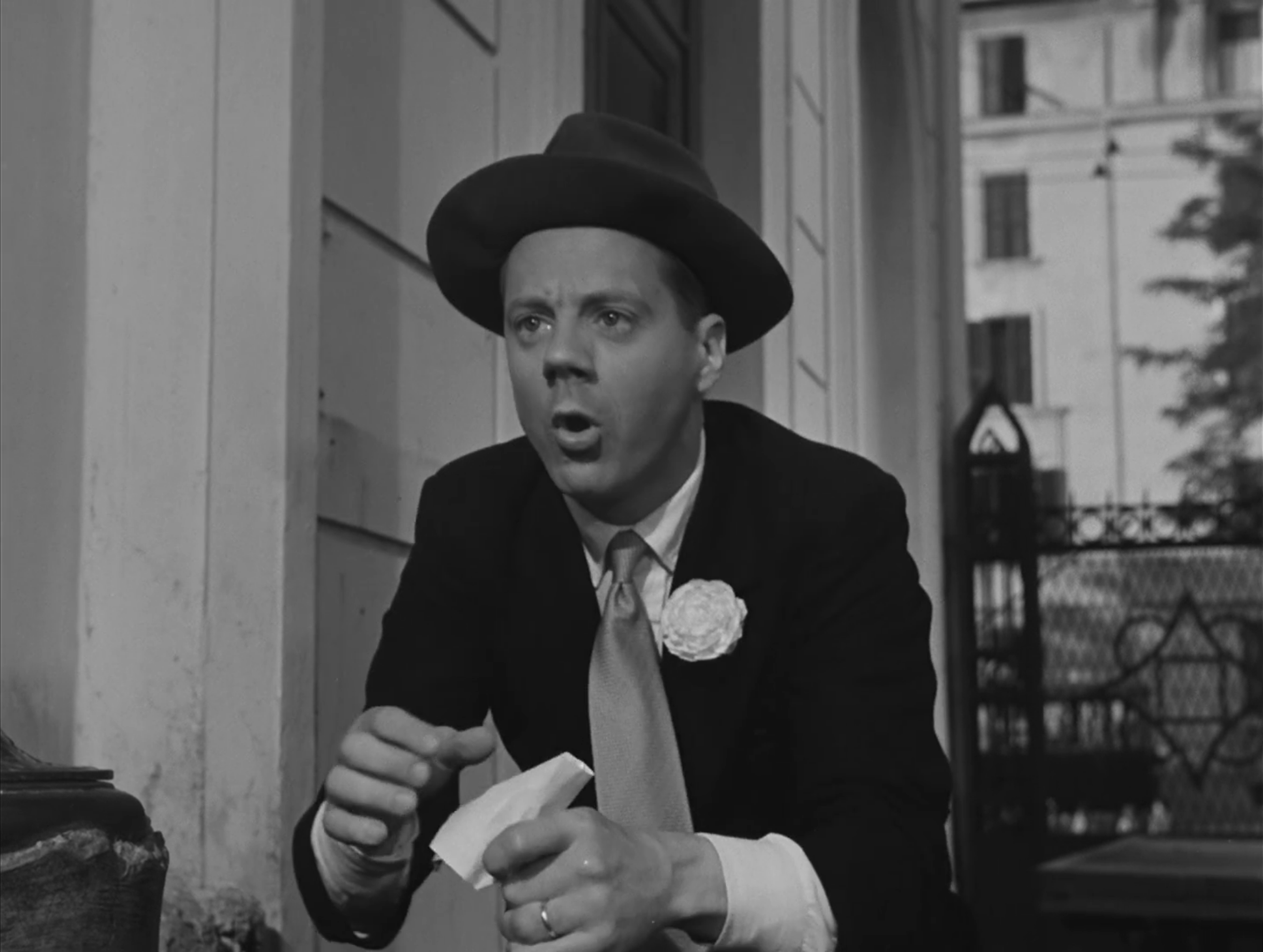
- Luzi in Auguri e figli maschi! (1951)
- Born: 27 September 1919; Trieste, Kingdom of Italy
- Died: 18 October 2011 (aged 92); Rome, Italy
- Occupation: Actor
- Years active: 1941-1980

Enrico Luzi (27 September 1919 – 18 October 2011) was an Italian actor. He appeared in more than sixty films from 1941 to 1980.

== Selected filmography ==
Year	Title	Role	Notes
1980	Il lupo e l'agnello		
1979	Assassinio sul Tevere		
1953	Voice of Silence		
1952	Three Forbidden Stories		
1952	Papà diventa mamma		
1952	Viva il cinema!		
1952	Beauties on Motor Scooters		
1951	Auguri e figli maschi!		
1951	Il microfono è vostro		
1950	My Beautiful Daughter		
1950	His Last Twelve Hours		
1950	That Ghost of My Husband		
1950	Totò Tarzan		
1947	Bullet for Stefano		
1943	Il birichino di papà		
1943	The Peddler and the Lady		
1942	Before the Postman		
