= The Reluctant Magician =

1951 film

- Directed by: Marino Girolami
- Written by: Marino Girolami; Marcello Marchesi; Vittorio Metz
- Produced by: Jone Tuzi
- Starring: Tino Scotti; Isa Barzizza; Aroldo Tieri
- Cinematography: Mario Albertelli
- Edited by: Franco Fraticelli
- Music by: Pippo Barzizza
- Production company: Mambretti Film
- Distributed by: Titanus
- Release date: 22 November 1951
- Running time: 85 minutes
- Country: Italy
- Language: Italian

The Reluctant Magician (Italian: Il Mago per forza) is a 1951 Italian comedy film directed by Marino Girolami and starring Tino Scotti, Isa Barzizza and Aroldo Tieri.

It was shot at the Farnesina Studios of Titanus in Rome. The film's sets were designed by the art director Flavio Mogherini. It earned 136 million Lira at the domestic box office.

== Plot ==
To avoid capture, a criminal on the run passes himself off as a magician. However, he comes to be an enormous hit and begins to strongly identify with the role.

== Cast ==
- Tino Scotti as Cavaliere
- Isa Barzizza as Perla
- Aroldo Tieri as Mago Trapani
- Adriano Rimoldi as Industriale
- Sophia Loren as La Sposa
- Carlo Mazzoni as Lo Sposo
- Mirella Uberti
- Dorian Gray
- Franco Volpi
- Mario Pisu
- Mario Siletti
- Vittorio Sanipoli
- Arturo Bragaglia

== Bibliography ==
- Chiti, Roberto & Poppi, Roberto. Dizionario del cinema italiano: Dal 1945 al 1959. Gremese Editore, 1991.
