= Luigi Cimara =

Italian actor (1891–1962)

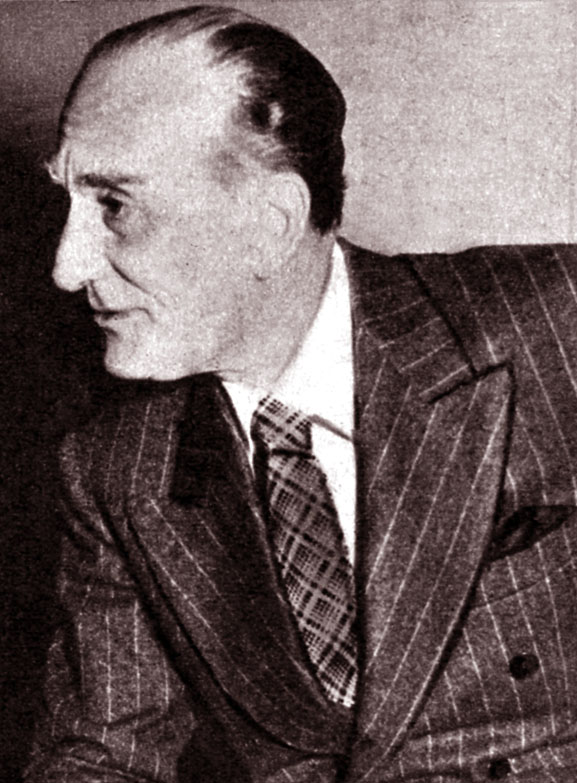
- Born: 19 July 1891; Rome, Italy
- Died: 26 January 1962 (aged 70); Rome, Italy
- Occupation: Actor
- Years active: 1914–1960

Luigi Cimara (19 July 1891 – 26 January 1962) was an Italian film actor. He appeared in 46 films between 1914 and 1960. He was born and died in Rome, Italy.

== Partial filmography ==
- L'esplosione del forte B.2 (1914)
- Cura di baci (1916)
- La macchia rossa (1916)
- Lotta d'elementi, raffiche d'anime (1917)
- Caino (1918) - Raoul Leveson
- L'autunno dell'amore (1918)
- Passion tzigane (1918)
- ...E dopo? (1918)
- L'onore della famiglia (1919)
- La colpa vendica la colpa (1919)
- Elevazione (1920)
- La rupe tarpea (1920) - Tonio
- La lotta per la vita (1921)
- The Telephone Operator (1932) - Il direttore del telefoni
- Loyalty of Love (1934) - Il principe de Metternich
- Unripe Fruit (1934) - Edoardo Manni
- The Joker King (1936) - Il conte Di Verolengo
- The Last Days of Pompeo (1937) - L'avvocato
- Destiny (1938)
- La Damigella di Bard (1938) - Il marchese Luciano di Pombia
- Belle o brutte si sposan tutte... (1939)
- Il piccolo re (1939)
- L'aria del continente (1939) - Peppino Patrone
- Dora Nelson (1939) - Alberto, il primo marito
- Wealth Without a Future (1940)
- Validità giorni dieci (1940) - Il conte Matropulous
- Il signore della taverna (1940)
- First Love (1941) - Il maestro Giacomo Asquini
- Honeymoon (1941) - Valerio, zio di Mario
- Redenzione (1943)
- L'amico Delle Donne (1943) - Il conte De Ryon
- Sant'Elena, piccola isola (1943) - Il maresciallo Bertrand
- Anything for a Song (1943)
- Il fiore sotto gli occhi (1944) - Il commendator Sanna, editore
- Adam and Eve (1949) - Ulisse
- Without a Flag (1951)
- Gli uomini non guardano il cielo (1952)
- In Olden Days (1952) - Il signore nell'auto scoperta (segment "Il carrettino dei libri vecchi")
- Five Paupers in an Automobile (1952) - L'investito
- The Enemy (1952) - Lord John Lumb
- Carne inquieta (1952) - Duca di Moliterno
- Lulu (1953) - Farnesi
- 100 Years of Love (1954) - Count Ubaldo di Lucoli (segment "Pendolin")
- The Boatman of Amalfi (1954) - Sir White - the consul
- Captain Falcon (1958) - Eremit
- A Breath of Scandal (1960)
