= Piero Filippone =

Italian art director

- Born: 20 November 1911; Naples, Campania, Italy
- Died: 1 January 1998 (aged 86); Santa Fe, New Mexico, United States
- Occupation: Art director
- Years active: 1935-1992

Piero Filippone (1911–1998) was an Italian art director who designed the sets for around two hundred films. He created the sets for Roberto Rossellini's 1954 film Journey to Italy.

== Selected filmography ==
- Three Cornered Hat (1935)
- The Lady in White (1938)
- For Men Only (1938)
- We Were Seven Widows (1939)
- Defendant, Stand Up! (1939)
- The Hotel of the Absent (1939)
- The Pirate's Dream (1940)
- Then We'll Get a Divorce (1940)
- Big Shoes (1940)
- Marco Visconti (1941)
- Bluebeard (1941)
- Seven Years of Good Luck (1942)
- Violets in Their Hair (1942)
- I Live as I Please (1942)
- Sealed Lips (1942)
- Nothing New Tonight (1942)
- Happy Days (1942)
- Seven Years of Happiness (1943)
- Anything for a Song (1943)
- Lively Teresa (1943)
- Apparition (1943)
- Two Suffer Better Than One (1943)
- Assunta Spina (1948)
- The Elusive Twelve (1950)
- The Merry Widower (1950)
- I'm in the Revue (1950)
- The Ungrateful Heart (1951)
- Four Red Roses (1951)
- Lieutenant Giorgio (1952)
- Frontier Wolf (1952)
- Deceit (1952)
- Brothers of Italy (1952)
- Sunday Heroes (1952)
- The Ship of Condemned Women (1953)
- The Daughter of the Regiment (1953)
- Journey to Italy (1954)
- The Friend of the Jaguar (1959)
- The Sign of the Coyote (1963)

== Bibliography ==
- Peter Brunette. Roberto Rossellini. University of California Press, 1996.
