= Marcello Marchesi =

Italian film director

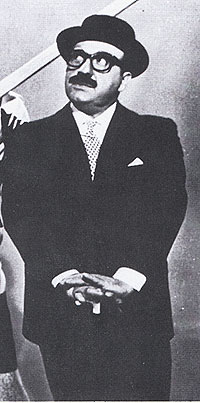
- Born: 4 April 1912; Milan, Italy
- Died: 19 July 1978 (aged 66); San Giovanni di Sinis, Italy
- Occupations: Screenwriter; Film director
- Years active: 1939–1977

Marcello Marchesi (Italian pronunciation: [marˈtʃɛllo marˈkeːzi]; 4 April 1912 – 19 July 1978) was an Italian author, screenwriter and film director. He wrote more than 60 films between 1939 and 1977. He also directed six films between 1951 and 1952. He was born in Milan and died in San Giovanni di Sinis, Cabras, Italy.

== Selected filmography ==
- Defendant, Stand Up! (1939)
- Non me lo dire! (1940)
- Schoolgirl Diary (1941)
- Invisible Chains (1942)
- The Lady Is Fickle (1942)
- Sealed Lips (1942)
- Nothing New Tonight (1942)
- The Za-Bum Circus (1944)
- The Whole City Sings (1945)
- Toto Tours Italy (1948)
- Fear and Sand (1948)
- Eleven Men and a Ball (1948)
- Be Seeing You, Father (1948)
- Little Lady (1949)
- The Firemen of Viggiù (1949)
- Adam and Eve (1949)
- Totò Tarzan (1950)
- I'm in the Revue (1950)
- The Steamship Owner (1951)
- The Dream of Zorro (1952)
- Figaro Here, Figaro There (1950)
- The Cadets of Gascony (1950)
- The Knight Has Arrived! (1950)
- Toto the Sheik (1950)
- Toto the Third Man (1951)
- The Reluctant Magician (1951)
- Beauties on Bicycles (1951)
- Seven Hours of Trouble (1951)
- I'm the Capataz (1951)
- Arrivano i nostri (1951)
- Free Escape (1951)
- Poppy (1952)
- If You Won a Hundred Million (1953)
- The Enchanting Enemy (1953)
- It Was She Who Wanted It! (1953)
- Laugh! Laugh! Laugh! (1954)
- Hercules in the Valley of Woe (1961)
- The Most Beautiful Couple in the World (1968)
