= World of Miracles =

- Directed by: Luigi Capuano
- Produced by: Fortunato Misiano
- Starring: Virna Lisi; Jacques Sernas
- Cinematography: Augusto Tiezzi
- Music by: Michele Cozzoli
- Release date: 1959
- Country: Italy
- Language: Italian

World of Miracles (Italian: Il mondo dei miracoli) is a 1959 Italian melodrama film directed by Luigi Capuano.

== Plot ==
Laura and Marco are two young lovers who act for a theater company. But one day Marco, having come into conflict with her father, who is an old actor, leaves the company to seek greater fortune in Rome, in the world of cinema.

Laura, after some time, is moved by a letter full of affection that Marco sent her, so she joins him in Rome, where he has rented a room from Franca, a good woman who tries to advise him well and who feels happy to welcome Laura in their own home. But the couple is put in crisis by the presence - unexpected for Laura - of another woman, a snobbish actress who seeks Marco's company and often calls him to invite him to her hotel room.

Laura, saddened, then returns to her father, who, due to too many emotions, dies during a performance on the stage of the theater. Meanwhile, Marco understands more and more that he does not want to give up on Laura's love.

== Cast ==
- Virna Lisi: Laura Damiani
- Jacques Sernas: Marco Valenti
- Marisa Merlini: Franca
- Aldo Silvani: Alessandro Damiani
- Elli Parvo: Magda Damiani
- Kerima: Carmen Herrera
- Yvonne Sanson: Sarah
- Vittorio De Sica: Director Pietro Giordani
- Amedeo Nazzari: Presenter at the press conference
- Andrea Checchi: Cinematographer
- Silvio Bagolini: Stationmaster
- Ignazio Leone: Il capo comparse
- Virgilio Riento: Oscaretto
- Marco Tulli: Adriano
- Leopoldo Valentini: Casimirio
- Ciccio Barbi: Commendatore Berbloni
- Bruno Corelli: Max
- Mario Brega: Man with a black eye
- Fanfulla
- Pietro Tordi
