= Repentance (1952 film) =

1952 film

- Film poster
- Directed by: Mario Costa
- Written by: Enzo Di Gianni
- Produced by: Enzo Di Gianni
- Starring: Paul Muller; Eva Nova; Nyta Dover
- Cinematography: Carlo Nebiolo
- Edited by: Enzo Di Gianni
- Music by: Renzo Rossellini
- Production companies: Eva Film; Rizzoli Film
- Distributed by: Indipendenti Regionali
- Release date: 5 February 1952
- Running time: 90 minutes
- Country: Italy
- Language: Italian

Repentance (Italian: Pentimento) is a 1952 Italian melodrama film directed by Mario Costa and starring Paul Muller, Eva Nova and Nyta Dover. The film's sets were designed by the art director Franco Fontana.

== Cast ==
- Paul Muller as Berardo Morelli
- Eva Nova as Margherita D'Angelo
- Nyta Dover as Ninì Dorè
- Cesare Danova as Sandro
- Bruno Corelli
- Doris Duranti
- Enrico Glori
- Gino Latilla
- Antonella Lualdi
- Dante Maggio
- Pamela Palma
- Nilla Pizzi
- Leopoldo Valentini

== Bibliography ==
- Chiti, Roberto & Poppi, Roberto. Dizionario del cinema italiano: Dal 1945 al 1959. Gremese Editore, 1991.
- Morreale, Emiliano. Così piangevano: Il cinema melò nell'Italia degli anni cinquanta. Donzelli Editore, 2011.
