= Virgilio Riento =

Italian actor

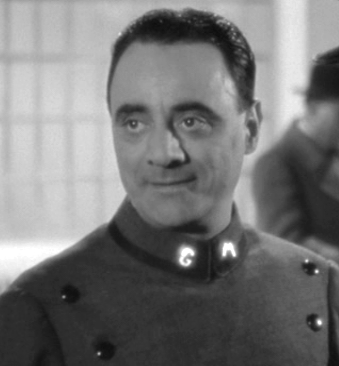
- Born: 29 November 1889; Rome, Kingdom of Italy
- Died: 7 September 1959 (aged 69); Rome, Italy
- Occupation: Actor
- Years active: 1936–1959

Virgilio Riento (29 November 1889 – 7 September 1959) was an Italian actor and comedian. He appeared in 108 films between 1936 and 1959.

== Life and career ==
The son of a theatrical impresario, Riento made his debut on stage as a child, as an impersonator of Nicola Maldacea. A member of the Compagnia Lillipuziana stage company, he got his first personal success with the play Roma di notte (1911). In the first post-war, he got a large success in avanspettacolo with several macchiette, notably the Abruzzo peasant Donato Collacchione, and with the Michele Galdieri's comedy play È bello qualche volta andare a piedi (1941), alongside Tina Pica. In films, he had an intense career as a comedic character actor, being often paired with Pica.

== Selected filmography ==
- Sette giorni all'altro mondo (1936) - Man on train
- Il signor Max (1937) - Pepe
- A Lady Did It (1938) - Pasquale
- For Men Only (1938) - Pasquale Pappalardo
- The Marquis of Ruvolito (1939) - Don Timurata
- I, His Father (1939) - Il cavaliere
- Department Store (1939) - Gaetano
- The Make Believe Pirates (1939)
- The Silent Partner' (1939) - Il maggiore
- Il signore della taverna (1940) - Il vice-commissario
- Il ponte dei sospiri (1940) - Bertuccio
- Boccaccio (1940) - Il bottaro
- Miseria e nobiltà (1940) - Felice
- Il re del circo (1941) - Bastiani, suo zio
- The Actor Who Disappeared (1941) - Il trovarobe
- Due cuori sotto sequestro (1941) - L'uffiziale giudiziario
- Teresa Venerdì (1941) - Antonio
- La scuola dei timidi (1941) - Roc
- Se io fossi onesto (1942) - Il direttore del carcere
- C'è un fantasma nel castello (1942) - Il poliziotto dilettante
- Alone at Last (1942) - Il cugino Michele
- Arriviamo noi! (1942) - Il primo gestorio del "castello delle streghe"
- Before the Postman (1942) - Il controllore
- The Little Teacher (1942) - Pallone, il bidello
- Charley's Aunt (1943) - Casimiro, it tutore
- Il nostro prossimo (1943) - Il sacristano
- Annabella's Adventure (1943) - Il padre di Roberto
- Gente dell'aria (1943) - Pacini, il maresciallo della sussistenza
- Life Is Beautiful (1943) - Matteo Boccaloni
- Non mi muovo! (1943) - Il portiere de la casa nuova
- Gli assi della risata (1943) - Pasquale Bellezza (segment "Il trionfo di Poppea") / Gervasio (segment "L'ombrello smarrito")
- Anything for a Song (1943) - L'industriale
- Arcobaleno (1943)
- No Turning Back (1945) - Don Alfonso Bortone - padre di Anna
- Vivere ancora (1945)
- I'll Sing No More (1945) - Roberto
- Chi l'ha visto? (1945) - Emilio
- Down with Misery (1945) - Gaetano Schioppa
- Peddlin' in Society (1946) - Don Nicola
- Il vento m'ha cantato una canzone (1947) - Scipione
- Lo sciopero dei milioni (1947)
- Fabiola (1949) - Pietro
- The Cadets of Gascony (1950) - Angelo Danati
- Donne e briganti (1950) - Fra Marco
- Rapture (1950) - Il capo della banda di Arcachon
- Sangue sul sagrato (1950)
- The Transporter (1950) - Il capo della banda di Arcachon
- Miracle in Milan (1951) - Il sergente delle guardie
- Beauties on Bicycles (1951) - Il padre di Marco
- I'm the Capataz (1951) - Il Guardiano
- It's Love That's Ruining Me (1951) - Proprietario Negozio
- La paura fa 90 (1951) - Barsilio, guardiano in seconda
- Una bruna indiavolata! (1951) - Cameriere
- Amor non ho... però... però (1951) - Il contadino
- Stasera sciopero (1951) - Augusto
- Tizio, Caio, Sempronio (1951) - Caio
- Porca miseria (1951) - Luigino
- Licenza premio (1951) - Enrico
- Ha fatto 13 (1951) - Cav. Brusaglia
- Viva il cinema! (1952) - Gambalesta
- The Passaguai Family Gets Rich (1952) - Cosimo Pedrozza
- Toto in Color (1952) - Tiburzi, il maestro
- Beauties in Capri (1952) - Il maresciallo
- Papà diventa mamma (1952)
- Falsehood (1952) - Il brigadiere Sante
- The Angels of the District (1952) - Cecco
- I, Hamlet (1952) - Anturio
- Giovinezza (1952) - Matteo
- The Piano Tuner Has Arrived (1952) - Bartolomeo Porretti
- Beauties on Motor Scooters (1952)
- Martin Toccaferro (1953) - Pasquale
- Bread, Love and Dreams (1953) - Don Emidio
- Lasciateci in pace (1953)
- Condannatelo! (1953) - Don Benedetto
- Café chantant (1953) - Zio Angelino
- Matrimonial Agency (1953) - Padre di Peppino
- A Day in Court (1954) - Virgilio Pampinelli
- 100 Years of Love (1954) - The Police Commissioner (segment "Nozze d'Oro")
- The Three Thieves (1954) - Commissario Zanini
- Piccola santa (1954) - Nicola
- Bread, Love and Jealousy (1954) - Don Emidio
- Le vacanze del sor Clemente (1955) - Angelino
- The Sign of Venus (1955) - Padre di Agnese
- The White Angel (1955) - Il dottor Marini
- Cantate con noi (1955) - Pasquale
- Ore 10: lezione di canto (1955) - Beniamino, il guardiano
- The Miller's Beautiful Wife (1955) - Salvatore
- Scandal in Sorrento (1955) - Don Emidio
- Il campanile d'oro (1955)
- Eighteen Year Olds (1955) - Il portiere del collegio
- Donatella (1956) - Nicola, Donatella's uncle
- Time of Vacation (1956) - Frate Serafino
- Guaglione (1956) - Rocco - Guitar player
- La capinera del mulino (1956) - Anselmo
- Donne, amore e matrimoni (1956) - Vincenzo Domenicantonio
- Cantando sotto le stelle (1956) - Virgilio
- Arriva la zia d'America (1956) - Eugenio - l'amministratore
- Poor, But Handsome (1957) - Giovanna's Father
- Doctor and the Healer (1957) - Umberto
- Il cocco di mamma (1957) - Aldo Manca's Father
- La zia d'America va a sciare (1957) - Il cavalier Eugenio
- Napoli, sole mio! (1958) - Don Nicolino Brunati
- Domenica è sempre domenica (1958) - The Bailiff
- El hombre del paraguas blanco (1958) - El cura
- È arrivata la parigina (1958) - Antonio
- Serenatella sciuè sciuè (1958) - Salvatore Scuoffolo
- Prepotenti più di prima (1959) - Il maresciallo
- World of Miracles (1959) - Oscaretto - il suggeritore
- Simpatico mascalzone (1959) - Onofrio
- Perfide.... ma belle (1959) - Gaspare
