= Tamara Lees =

English actress

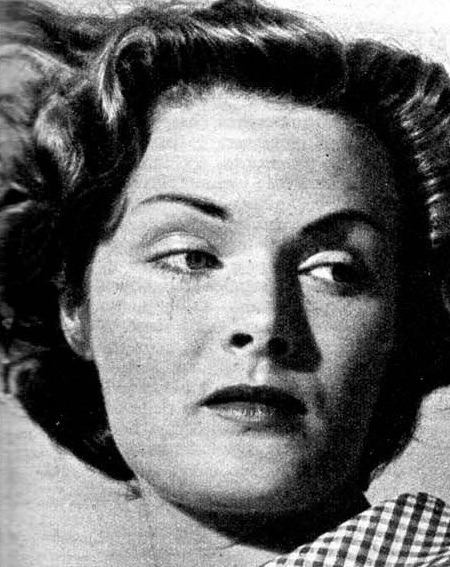
- Lees in Four Ways Out (1951)
- Born: Diana Helena Mapplebeck; 14 December 1924; Vienna, Austria
- Died: 22 December 1999 (aged 75); Worcestershire, England
- Occupation: Actress
- Years active: 1947–1961

Tamara Lees (14 December 1924 – 22 December 1999), born as Diana Helena Tamara Mapplebeck, was an Austrian-born English film actress. She appeared in 48 films between 1947 and 1961.

== Filmography ==
Year	Title	Role	Notes
1947	While the Sun Shines	Manicurist	
1948	Bond Street		Uncredited
1948	A Piece of Cake	Dinner Guest	
1949	Stop Press Girl	Carole	Uncredited
1949	Marry Me	Arty Woman	Uncredited
1949	Trottie True	Gaiety Girl	Uncredited
1949	Il falco rosso	Clotilde di Tuscolo	
1949	Romanticismo	Anna	
1950	Her Favourite Husband	Rosana	
1950	A Dog's Life	Franca	
1950	Toto the Sheik	Antinea, la regina di Atlantide	
1951	Song of Spring	Evi	
1951	Verginità	Lidia	
1951	Four Ways Out	La donna del ritratto	
1951	Beauties in Capri	Concetta	
1951	Filumena Marturano	Diana	
1951	Tizio, Caio, Sempronio	La sacerdotessa di Iside	
1952	The Wonderful Adventures of Guerrin Meschino	maga Alcina	
1952	Frontier Wolf	Barbara	
1952	The Phantom Musketeer	Sibilla	
1952	Girls Marked Danger	Clara	
1952	The Secret of Three Points	Contessa Marion Lamperti	
1952	The Piano Tuner Has Arrived	Adelina Porretti	
1952	Il tallone di Achille	Sonia	
1953	Perdonami!	Vera	
1953	Noi peccatori	Fausta	
1953	Frine, Courtesan of Orient	Criside	
1953	I Always Loved You	Clara	
1953	Anna perdonami	Contessa Wanda	
1953	Balocchi e profumi		
1954	Terra straniera	Amante proprietario minera	
1954	The Contessa's Secret	La princesse de Metternich	
1954	Queen of Babylon	Lisia	
1955	Goodbye Naples	Irene	
1955	Beautiful but Dangerous	Manolita	
1955	Songs of Italy		
1955	Torna piccina mia!	Dora	
1956	Incatenata dal destino	Stella Erler	
1956	Lo spadaccino misterioso		
1956	Serenata al vento		
1957	Ho amato una diva	Elsa	
1957	Orizzonte infuocato	Stefania	
1957	Il tiranno del Garda		
1958	Three Strangers in Rome	Magda, Sandro's lover	
1959	Agosto, donne mie non vi conosco	La signora misteriosa	
1961	Sword in the Shadows	Contessa Ottavia della Rocca	(final film role)
