= Mancori =

Mancori is a surname. Notable people with the surname include:

- Alvaro Mancori (1923–2011), Italian cinematographer
- Guglielmo Mancori (1927–1995), Italian cinematographer, lighting director, and camera operator
- Raffaele Masciocchi, Italian cinematographer
