= Past Lovers =

1953 film by Adelchi Bianchi

- Directed by: Adelchi Bianchi
- Written by: Fulvio Palmieri; Edoardo Anton; Adelchi Bianchi
- Produced by: Gianni Solitro
- Starring: Lia Amanda; Vittorio Sanipoli; Irene Genna
- Cinematography: Giuseppe La Torre
- Edited by: Otello Colangeli
- Music by: Carlo Innocenzi
- Production company: Valor Film
- Release date: 1953
- Running time: 89 minutes
- Country: Italy
- Language: Italian

Past Lovers (Italian: Amanti del passato) is a 1953 Italian melodrama film that was directed by Adelchi Bianchi and starring Lia Amanda, Vittorio Sanipoli and Irene Genna.

== Main cast ==
- Lia Amanda as Anna
- Vittorio Sanipoli as Carlo
- Irene Genna as Roberta
- Lauro Gazzolo as Servitore
- Michele Malaspina as Count Bernardo
- Gino Leurini
- Mirko Ellis
- Nino Milano
