= Alberto Sorrentino =

Italian actor (1916–1994)

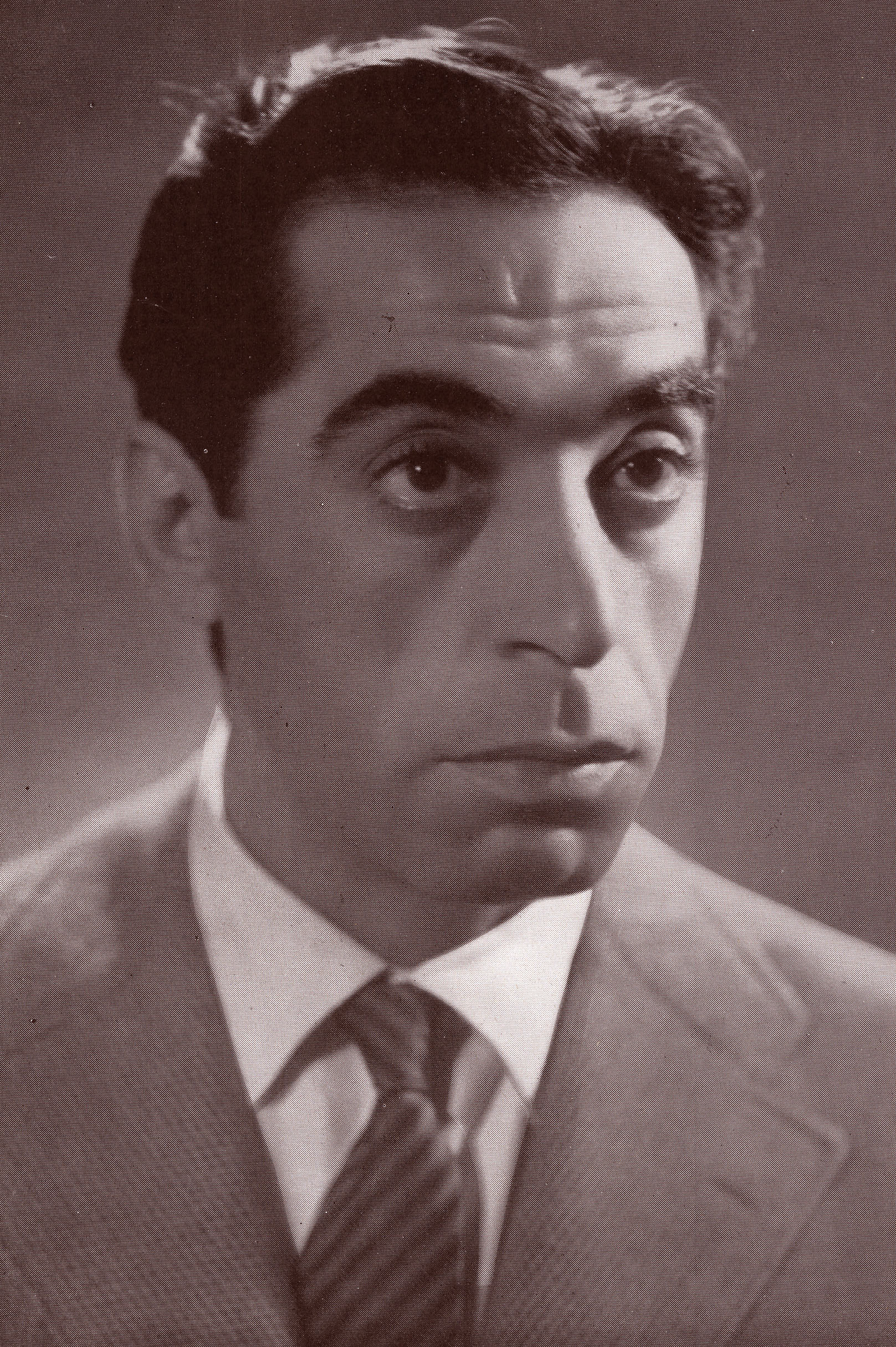
- Born: 16 February 1916; La Spezia, Kingdom of Italy
- Died: 31 January 1994 (aged 77); Rome, Italy
- Occupation: Actor
- Years active: 1943–1988

Alberto Sorrentino (16 February 1916 – 31 January 1994) was an Italian film actor. He appeared in 89 films between 1943 and 1988.

== Selected filmography ==
- The Last Wagon (1943) - Un passante
- I cadetti di Guascogna (1950) - Il comico
- Totò Tarzan (1950) - L'usciere
- I'm the Capataz (1951) - Un rivoluzionario
- Arrivano i nostri (1951) - Guido, il morto di fame
- Milano miliardaria (1951) - Oscar, il fotografo
- Accidents to the Taxes!! (1951) - Arturo
- Toto the Third Man (1951) - Giovannino - Il giornalista
- Seven Hours of Trouble (1951) - Raffaele
- The Steamship Owner (1951) - Il disegnatore
- My Heart Sings (1951) - 'Signorina'
- Stasera sciopero (1951)
- Tizio, Caio, Sempronio (1951)
- Viva il cinema! (1952) - Giovanni
- Sardinian Vendetta (1952) - Narciso Bellezza
- Abracadabra (1952) - Fernando, detto Fefè
- Maschera nera (1952)
- Beauties in Capri (1952) - Pasquale
- In Olden Days (1952) - (segment "Il processo di Frine") (uncredited)
- Five Paupers in an Automobile (1952) - Il padrone ansioso
- I tre corsari (1952) - Agonia
- Giovinezza (1952) - Venditore ambulante
- The Piano Tuner Has Arrived (1952) - Signor Narducci
- Drama on the Tiber (1952) - Il saputello
- Jolanda, the Daughter of the Black Corsair (1953) - Agonia
- Una donna prega (1953) - Beniamino
- Fermi tutti... arrivo io! (1953) - Fotografo
- Martin Toccaferro (1953)
- Funniest Show on Earth (1953) - Bastian
- Anni facili (1953)
- Ivan, Son of the White Devil (1953) - Stepan
- Viva la rivista! (1953)
- If You Won a Hundred Million (1953) - Un impiegato (segment "Il principale")
- Passione (1953)
- Finalmente libero! (1953) - Ernesto
- Anna perdonami (1953)
- La prigioniera di Amalfi (1954)
- The Country of the Campanelli (1954) - Il marinaio ebete
- Genoese Dragnet (1954) - Autista dell'autocisterna (uncredited)
- It Happened at the Police Station (1954) - Comic actor
- Naples Is Always Naples (1954)
- Trieste cantico d'amore (1954) - Albert
- La tua donna (1954)
- Bertoldo, Bertoldino e Cacasenno (1954) - Bertoldino
- Cuore di mamma (1955) - Baron De Pasquale
- Suor Maria (1955) - Il regista
- Da qui all'eredità (1955) - Alberto
- Faccia da mascalzone (1956)
- I giorni più belli (1956) - L'usciere del provveditorato
- Cantando sotto le stelle (1956) - Augusto Pezzetti 1°
- Pirate of the Half Moon (1957)
- I dritti (1957) - Limon Limonero
- Il tiranno del Garda (1957)
- Le dritte (1958) - 'Dolcecuore'
- Valeria ragazza poco seria (1958)
- L'amore nasce a Roma (1958) - Rubino
- Sorrisi e canzoni (1958)
- Arriva la banda (1959)
- Non perdiamo la testa (1959) - Cameriere
- La cento chilometri (1959) - The Man Who Refuses Underpants (uncredited)
- Il terrore dell'Oklahoma (1959)
- Quanto sei bella Roma (1959)
- Agosto, donne mie non vi conosco (1959)
- Simpatico mascalzone (1959) - Giulebbe
- Prepotenti più di prima (1959) - Mimmo
- La sceriffa (1960) - Brutto Tempo - the native American
- Appuntamento a Ischia (1960) - The Doorkeeper (uncredited)
- The Giants of Thessaly (1960) - Licaone
- Caravan petrol (1960) - Omar
- A Qualcuna Piace Calvo (1960) - Moreno
- Cronache del '22 (1961)
- Boccaccio '70 (1962) - Worker (segment "Le tentazioni del dottor Antonio") (uncredited)
- The Seventh Sword (1962) - Sancho
- Gli onorevoli (1963) - Ercole Ssnsoni
- Vino, whisky e acqua salata (1963)
- The Mona Lisa Has Been Stolen (1966) - le domestique et chauffeur de Vincent
- Cuore matto... matto da legare (1967)
- Donne... botte e bersaglieri (1968) - Hairdresser's assistant
- Vacanze sulla Costa Smeralda (1968)
- I 2 pompieri (1968) - Priest
- Ms. Stiletto (1969) - Uno zingaro
- Poppea's Hot Nights (1969) - Drusilla's John
- Lady Barbara (1970) - The Waiter Ambrogio
- Armiamoci e partite! (1971) - Train Passenger with bag
- Jus primae noctis (1972) - The friar
- Ubalda, All Naked and Warm (1972) - Notaio Adone Bellezza
- Torso (1973) - Countryman / First Crime Scene (uncredited)
- Il gatto di Brooklyn aspirante detective (1973) - Lazzaro De Li Mortazzi - the watchman of 'Villa Allegra'
- Il lumacone (1974) - Tipografo
- Il santo patrono (1975)
- Occhio alla vedova! (1976)
- Action (1980) - Garibaldi
- Una botta di vita (1988)
