= I pinguini ci guardano =

- Directed by: Guido Leoni
- Written by: Guido Leoni
- Story by: Marcella Altieri; Roberto de Leonardis; Guido Leoni; Giorgio Lotta
- Produced by: Marcella Altieri
- Starring: Renato Rascel; Carlo Croccolo
- Cinematography: Mario Bonicatti
- Music by: Carlo Innocenzi
- Distributed by: Variety Distribution
- Release date: 1956
- Language: Italian

I pinguini ci guardano (i.e. "Penguins look at us") is a 1956 Italian comedy film written and directed by Guido Leoni and starring Renato Rascel and Carlo Croccolo.

== Plot ==
The daily life in a zoo seen through the eyes of their residents, with the animals talking, exposing their problems, and commenting the gestures of men.

== Cast ==
- Renato Rascel
- Carlo Croccolo
- Fiorenzo Fiorentini
- Ave Ninchi
- Isa Barzizza
- Rosalba Neri
- Alba Arnova
- Tina De Mola
- Isa Miranda
- Tino Scotti
- Clelia Matania
- Emma Danieli
- Domenico Modugno
- Renzo Giovampietro
- Turi Pandolfini
- Luigi Pavese
- Aldo Fabrizi (voice)
- Tina Lattanzi (voice)
- Anna Magnani (voice)
- Paolo Panelli (voice)
- Alberto Sordi (voice)
- Franca Valeri (voice)
