= Buonanotte =

Buonanotte is an Italian surname. Notable people with the surname include:

- Diego Buonanotte (born 1988), Argentine footballer
- Facundo Buonanotte (born 2004), Argentine footballer

== See also ==
- Buonanotte... avvocato!
- Buonanotte Bettina
