= Beauties in Capri =

- Directed by: Adelchi Bianchi
- Written by: Mario Amendola; Nando Bruno; Luigi Capuano; Ruggero Maccari; Michele Malaspina
- Starring: Nando Bruno; Ave Ninchi; Tamara Lees
- Cinematography: Carlo Bellero; Aldo Giordani
- Edited by: Mario Bonotti
- Music by: Tarcisio Fusco
- Production company: Egeria Film
- Distributed by: Egeria Film
- Release date: November 1951
- Running time: 90 minutes
- Country: Italy
- Language: Italian

Beauties in Capri (Italian: Bellezze a Capri) is a 1951 Italian comedy film directed by Adelchi Bianchi and starring Nando Bruno, Ave Ninchi and Tamara Lees.

== Cast ==
- Nando Bruno as Don Violante
- Ave Ninchi as Cornelia
- Anna Bianchi as Clelia
- Armando Francioli as Gennaro
- Tamara Lees as Concetta
- Lauro Gazzolo as Don Camillo
- Aroldo Tieri as Zalasky
- Alberto Sorrentino as Pasquale
- Anna Arena as Assunta
- Carlo Delle Piane as Peppino
- Mario Carotenuto as Il direttore del 'Dancing'
- Virgilio Riento as Il maresciallo
- Michele Malaspina as Procolo
- Pamela Palma as La danzatrice
- Augusto Gamucci as Ballerino
- Carlo Romano as Vittorio
- Marco Tulli as Il maestro di tuffi
- Oscar Andriani as Il vescovo
- Roberta Bianchi as La bambina
- Guido Riccioli
- Vanda Carr
- Giovanna Mazzotti
- Rita Andreana
- Giorgio Consolini as Cantante
- Franco Carli as Cantante

== Reception ==
The film received mixed contemporary reviews, one stating: "Good-looking women and a thin plot give its impulse to the film, whose narrative technique does not seem of quality."

== Bibliography ==
- Lino Miccichè. Storia del cinema italiano: 1954-1959. Edizioni di Bianco & Nero, 2001.
