= Arrigo Equini =

Italian art director

- Occupation: Art director
- Years active: 1942–1977 (film)

Arrigo Equini was an Italian art director who designed the sets of around eighty films during his career.

== Selected filmography ==
- The Black Panther (1942)
- Fourth Page (1942)
- The Black Eagle (1946)
- The White Devil (1947)
- Ring Around the Clock (1950)
- The Captain of Venice (1951)
- I'm the Capataz (1951)
- Beatrice Cenci (1956)
- Cleopatra's Daughter (1960)
- The Pharaohs' Woman (1960)
- The 300 Spartans (1962)
- War of the Trojans (1962)
- Cast a Giant Shadow (1966)
- Buona Sera, Mrs. Campbell (1968)
- Hornets' Nest (1970)
- The Assassination of Trotsky (1972)
- Massacre in Rome (1973)

== Bibliography ==
- James Palmer, Michael Riley. The Films of Joseph Losey. Cambridge University Press, 1993.
