= I'm the Capataz =

1951 film

- Directed by: Giorgio Simonelli
- Written by: Adriano Bolzoni; Marcello Marchesi; Vittorio Metz; Cesare Rivelli
- Produced by: Arrigo Colombo
- Starring: Renato Rascel; Silvana Pampanini; Marilyn Buferd
- Cinematography: Tonino Delli Colli
- Edited by: Elsa Dubbini
- Music by: Armando Fragna; Felice Montagnini
- Production company: Jolly Film
- Distributed by: Jolly Film
- Release date: 28 February 1951
- Running time: 102 minutes
- Country: Italy
- Language: Italian

I'm the Capataz (Italian: Io sono il capataz) is a 1951 Italian western-comedy film directed by Giorgio Simonelli, and starring Renato Rascel, Silvana Pampanini and Marilyn Buferd.

It was shot at the Incir-De Paolis Studios in Rome. The film's sets were designed by the art directors Arrigo Equini. The film was a commercial hit, earning around 421 million lira at the box office.

== Cast ==
- Renato Rascel as Uguccione / Rascelito Villa
- Silvana Pampanini as Rosa de Fuego
- Luigi Pavese as Erasmo
- Marilyn Buferd as Moira
- Bruno Corelli as Il Sarto Francese
- Nino Crisman as Gonzales
- Vittorio Duse as Puchero
- Sophia Loren as Segretaria del Dittatore
- Mario Pisu as Hurtado
- Virgilio Riento as Il Guardiano
- Vickie Henderson as Danzatrice
- Kiki Urbani as Danzatrice Bianca
- Carlo Delle Piane as giovane popolano
- Alberto Sorrentino as un rivoluzionario

== Bibliography ==
- Chiti, Roberto & Poppi, Roberto. Dizionario del cinema italiano: Dal 1945 al 1959. Gremese Editore, 1991.
- Gundle, Stephen. Fame Amid the Ruins: Italian Film Stardom in the Age of Neorealism. Berghahn Books, 2019.
