= Giovinezza (film) =

1952 film

- Directed by: Giorgio Pastina
- Written by: Eduardo Passarelli; Fiorenzo Fiorentini; Carlo Musso; Giorgio Pastina; Weiss Ruffilli
- Produced by: Weiss Ruffilli
- Starring: Delia Scala; Hélène Rémy; Franco Interlenghi
- Cinematography: Tino Santoni
- Edited by: Edmond Lozzi
- Music by: Mario Ferri
- Production company: Zeus Film
- Distributed by: Zeus Film
- Release date: 1952
- Running time: 91 minutes
- Country: Italy
- Language: Italian

Giovinezza is a 1952 Italian comedy film directed by Giorgio Pastina and starring Delia Scala, Hélène Rémy and Franco Interlenghi. It was shot at the Cinecittà Studios in Rome. The film's sets were designed by the art director Giovanni Sarazani.

== Cast ==
- Delia Scala as Tamara
- Hélène Rémy as Anna
- Franco Interlenghi as Mario
- Camillo Pilotto as Cesare
- Carlo Sposito as Venditore ambulante
- Virgilio Riento as Matteo
- Eduardo Passarelli as Il brigadiere
- Riccardo Billi as Venditore ambulante
- Nilla Pizzi as Cantante
- Enrico Luzi as Venditore ambulante
- Alberto Sordi as Alberto
- Alberto Sorrentino as Venditore ambulante
- Gino Latilla as Cantante
- Mario Riva as Venditore ambulante
- Charles Trenet as Cantante

== Bibliography ==
- Powrie, Phil & Cadalanu, Marie . The French Film Musical. Bloomsbury Publishing, 2020.
- Spagnoli, Marco . Alberto Sordi: storia di un italiano. Adnkronos libri, 2003.
