= Amor non ho... però... però =

1951 film

- Directed by: Giorgio Bianchi
- Cinematography: Mario Bava
- Music by: Mario Nascimbene
- Release date: 1951
- Country: Italy
- Language: Italian

Amor non ho... però... però ("I did not love... but... but") is a 1951 Italian comedy film directed by Giorgio Bianchi.

== Cast ==
- Renato Rascel: Teodoro
- Gina Lollobrigida: Gina
- Franca Marzi
- Aroldo Tieri: Giuliano
- Kiki Urbani: Kiki
- Luigi Pavese: Antonio Scutipizzo
- Nyta Dover
- Guglielmo Barnabò
- Carlo Ninchi: Maurizio
- Virgilio Riento: Il contadino
- Adriana Danieli: Olga
- Galeazzo Benti
- Strelsa Brown: Mabel
- Marco Tulli
- Riccardo Vianello
