= Rossana Rory =

Italian actress (1927–2020)

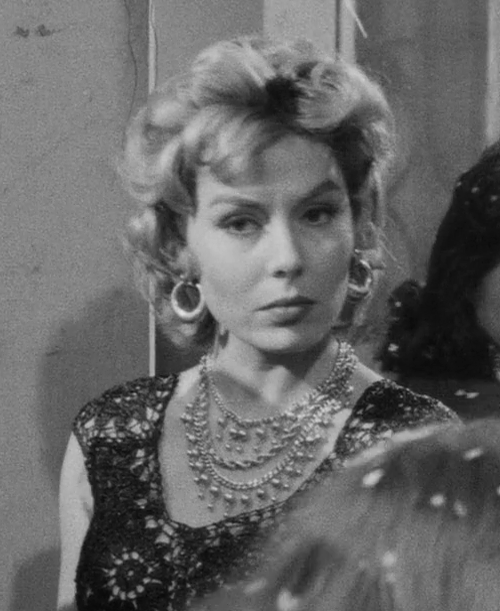
- Rory in Big Deal on Madonna Street (1958)
- Born: Rossana Coppa; 7 August 1927; Rome, Italy
- Died: 1 April 2020 (aged 92); Ciampino, Italy
- Occupation: Actress
- Years active: 1944–1962

Rossana Rory (7 August 1927 – 1 April 2020) was an Italian actress best known for her performance as Norma in Mario Monicelli's caper film Big Deal on Madonna Street (1958).

== Career ==
Rory began working as a model at the age of seventeen, posing mainly for the stylist Vincenzo Ferdinandi and in fotoromanzi in the weekly magazines Sogno, Luna Park, and Cine Illustrato. In 1951, she made her film debut in Max Neufeld's Licenza premio. Dissatisfied by a series of supporting roles, Rory went to London to attend acting courses at the Royal Academy of Dramatic Art, with hopes of a career in Hollywood.

Her lack of luck in American films convinced her to return to Italy, where she appeared in Guido Malatesta's El Alamein (1957) and Mario Monicelli's Big Deal on Madonna Street (1958). The last film she made before her retirement from cinema was Michelangelo Antonioni's L'eclisse (1962).

Rory died in Ciampino on 1 April 2020, at the age of 92.

== Partial filmography ==
- The Ungrateful Heart (1951)
- It Takes Two to Sin in Love (1954)
- The River Changes (1956)
- The Big Boodle (1957)
- Hell Canyon Outlaws (1957)
- Captain Falcon (1958)
- Big Deal on Madonna Street (1958)
- I soliti ignoti (1958)
- Robin Hood and the Pirates (1960)
- Come September (1961)
