= The River Changes =

1956 American film directed by Owen Crompton

- Directed by: Owen Crump
- Written by: Owen Crump
- Produced by: Owen Crump
- Starring: Rossana Rory; Harold Maresch; Renate Mannhardt
- Cinematography: Ellis W. Carter
- Edited by: James Moore
- Music by: Roy Webb
- Production company: Warner Bros. Pictures
- Release date: February 14, 1956 (US)
- Running time: 93 minutes
- Countries: United States; West Germany
- Language: English

The River Changes is a 1956 American drama film, written and directed by Owen Crump. It stars Rossana Rory, Harold Maresch, and Renate Mannhardt, and was first shown to critics in special screenings on February 14, 1956.

== Cast list ==
- Rossana Rory as Mayram
- Harold Maresch as Kurus
- Renate Mannhardt as Leah
- Henry Fisher as The leader
- Jaspar V. Oertzen as Jonathan
- Nick Solomatin as Asa
- Otto Friebel as The questioner
- Rene Magron as Teman
- Bert Brandt as Aaron
- Ilse Ruth Roskam
