= Tino Scotti =

Italian actor

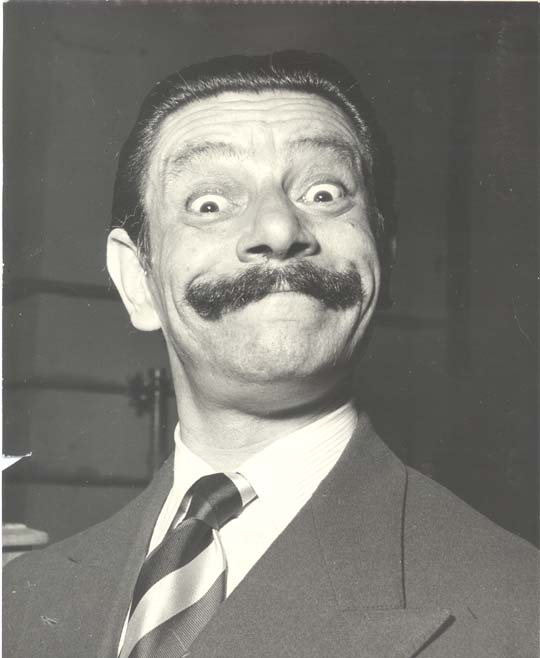
- Born: 16 November 1905; Milan, Italy
- Died: 16 October 1984 (aged 78); Tarquinia, Italy
- Occupation: Actor
- Years active: 1940–1984

Tino Scotti (16 November 1905 – 16 October 1984) was an Italian film actor. He appeared in 65 films between 1940 and 1984. He was born in Milan, Italy, and died in Tarquinia, Italy.

== Partial filmography ==
- Fanfulla da Lodi (1940)
- La donna perduta (1940) - Asdrubale, il cameriere
- The Pirate's Dream (1940) - Il barbiere
- Non me lo dire! (1940) - Il matto
- Caravaggio (1941)
- Sealed Lips (1942) - Francesco Ugoletti
- Nothing New Tonight (1942) - Il comico del varietà
- Il fanciullo del West (1942) - Penna bianca
- Pazzo d'amore (1942) - Fegato
- La valle del diavolo (1943) - Olaf, il marinaio attendente
- Two Suffer Better Than One (1943) - Il maggiordomo
- Lively Teresa (1943) - Albertaccio
- Anything for a Song (1943) - Il maestro di musica
- The Last Wagon (1943) - Valentino Doriani, il comico
- Chi l'ha visto? (1945)
- Departure at Seven (1946) - Filippo
- Pian delle stelle (1946)
- Before Him All Rome Trembled (1946) - Mechanic
- Voglio bene soltanto a te (1946) - Pasqualino
- Biraghin (1946)
- Ritrovarsi (1947)
- Caterina da Siena (1947)
- Sono io l'assassino (1948)
- A Dog's Life (1950) - (uncredited)
- The Knight Has Arrived! (1950) - Il Cavaliere
- Milano miliardaria (1951) - Il cavaliere Luigi Pizzigoni
- The Reluctant Magician (1951) - Cavaliere
- The Passaguai Family (1951) - Commendator Billetti
- Solo per te Lucia (1952)
- I morti non pagano tasse (1952) - Marco Vecchietti / Giovanni Rossi
- Il tallone di Achille (1952) - Cav. Achille Rosso
- Fermi tutti... arrivo io! (1953) - Andreanovic / Zanzara
- Viva la rivista! (1953)
- Siamo tutti milanesi (1953)
- If You Won a Hundred Million (1953) - Ambrogio (segment "Il tifoso")
- Laugh! Laugh! Laugh! (1954) - comm. Rossi
- I pinguini ci guardano (1956)
- Valeria ragazza poco seria (1958) - Clemente
- Via col para... vento (1958)
- Destinazione Sanremo (1959) - Capostazione
- Guardatele ma non toccatele (1959) - Portiere d'albergo
- Gastone (1960) - The conjurer
- The Sheriff (1960) - The Judge
- ...And Suddenly It's Murder! (1960) - Fiorenzo
- Le ambiziose (1961) - Il commendator Bartolazzi
- Bellezze sulla spiaggia (1961)
- Twist, lolite e vitelloni (1962) - Barone Lanciarossa
- L'assassino si chiama Pompeo (1962) - The Psychoanalyst
- Il medico delle donne (1962)
- Un marito in condominio (1963) - Commendator Martino Martini
- Canzoni in... bikini (1963) - Ulderico & Simone Berardelli
- Marinai in coperta (1967) - Comm. Pellegatti
- Isabella, duchessa dei diavoli (1969) - Melicour
- The Howl (1970) - Intellectual at school
- The Spider's Stratagem (1970) - Costa
- Sesso in testa (1974) - Totuccio Angeletti
- City Under Siege (1974) - Il cavalier Battista
- Paolo il freddo (1974) - Commendator Galbusera
- Todo modo (1976) - Il cuoco
- Care amiche mie (1981)
