= In Olden Days =

1952 film

- Directed by: Alessandro Blasetti
- Written by: Alessandro Blasetti; Suso Cecchi d'Amico; Oreste Biancoli; Sandro Continenza; Vitaliano Brancati; Aldo De Benedetti; Turi Vasile; Filippo Mercati; Brunello Rondi
- Produced by: Carlo Civallero
- Starring: Gina Lollobrigida; Amedeo Nazzari; Vittorio De Sica; Elisa Cegani
- Cinematography: Carlo Montuori; Gábor Pogány
- Edited by: Mario Serandrei
- Music by: Alessandro Cicognini
- Production company: Società Italiana Cines
- Distributed by: RKO Radio Films (Italy)
- Release date: 28 September 1952
- Running time: 122 minutes
- Country: Italy
- Language: Italian

In Olden Days (Italian: Altri tempi) is a 1952 Italian comedy drama anthology film directed by Alessandro Blasetti and featuring an ensemble cast that included Gina Lollobrigida, Amedeo Nazzari, Vittorio De Sica, Elisa Cegani, Barbara Florian, Aldo Fabrizi, Andrea Checchi and Alba Arnova. It was shot at the Cinecittà Studios in Rome. The film's sets were designed by the art directors Dario Cecchi and Veniero Colasanti. It is also known as Times Gone By and Infidelity.

== Plot ==
=== The cart of old books ===
A good-natured peddler of old books shows his customers some works from the past and is pranked by the rowdy son of a newsagent.

=== Excelsior dance ===
Filmed reconstruction of the Excelsior Ball, an allegorical late-century dance by the composer Romualdo Marenco performed for the first time at the Teatro alla Scala in Milan on 11 January 1881.

=== Less than a day ===
Two lovers, for contingent reasons, manage to see each other in a hotel room once a year, for a few hours, but due to some quarrels and jealousies they are unable to consume their relationship.

=== The Sardinian drummer ===
During the first war of independence fought against the Austrians, a very young drummer, delivering an important message to the Italian command, is hit and loses a leg (episode from the book "Cuore").

=== Matter of interest ===
Two peasants scramble for possession of manure dung.

=== The idyll ===
Tender summer idyll between two children from upper-class families. Guido, because of a kiss given to the sweet Greek girl Filli, wonders if the kiss could have generated a child and also fears for his maid, who had a baby without being married. With the end of the summer comes the painful separation.

=== The vice ===
A trader discovers his wife's cheating with his business partner. Upon returning home, at first he pretends nothing has happened, then with an excuse he sends the maid away and after denying his wife her forgiveness, threatening to take her children away from her, induces her to take her life.

=== Potpourri of songs ===
Story of a happy courtship and marriage, enlivened by the birth of a child and concluded with the departure of her husband for the war, from which she may not return.

The songs to which the title refers are Lo specio me ga finger, Oh Trieste, oh blessed Trieste, Forbidden Music, Un peu d'amour, Le valse bleu, Baciami baciami, Santa Lucia and Tripoli bel suol d'amore.

=== The Trial of Phryne ===
Naples. A commoner is tried for trying to poison her husband and mother-in-law together. Thanks to her irrepressible beauty, the defense attorney appointed ex officio succeeds with an inspired and vehement harangue to overturn the situation, dragging the public and jurors to the side of the accused.

Obtained from a short story by Edoardo Scarfoglio, and referring to an ancient story of the ethereal Phryne, he remained famous above all because Vittorio De Sica, in the role of the defender of the prosperous graces of a commoner (played by Gina Lollobrigida), coined the term "increased physics" which will in fact mark an era and will be widely used throughout the 1950s and most of the 1960s. The exact reference, in the sentence pronounced in the film by De Sica during the speech, is: "increased physics" as opposed to the phrase "psychic handicapped".

Vittorio De Sica in this episode is at his first appearance alongside Gina Lollobrigida; both actors, the following year, will seize great popularity as the marshal and the bersagliera in the film Bread, love and fantasy directed by Luigi Comencini.

It should only be noted that the scene of the "trial in court" for Italian cinema is an unmissable event, starting with the forerunners. Defendant, get up! by Mario Mattoli (1939) with Erminio Macario up to San Giovanni taken off by Amleto Palermi (1940) with Totò, and in this film he finds a fundamental scene for aficionados. Later scenes of trials will make the fortune of Nando Mericoni "American in Rome" (Alberto Sordi) in the duology of Stefano Vanzina Un giorno in magistrale (1953) and Un americano a Roma (1954), up to Christian De Sica who in 1984 will pay an explicit homage to this scene played by his father, as Praetor of the film Mi fa causa (1984).

== Cast ==
=== Il carrettino dei libri vecchi ===
- Aldo Fabrizi: the street vendor of ancient books;
- Pina Renzi: the newsagent
- Enzo Staiola: his son
- Luigi Cimara: gentleman on the convertible
- Marisa Merlini: lady on the convertible
- Galeazzo Benti: her lover
- Mario Riva: the fussy customer

=== Ballo Excelsior ===
- Alba Arnova: the Progress
- Carlo Mazzone-Clementi: the Obscurantism
- Anna Maria Bugliari: Italy
- Mirdza Capanna: the Light
- Antonio Acqua: the Science
- Dino Raffaelli: the Art
- Filippo Morucci: Alessandro Volta

=== Meno di un giorno ===
- Alba Arnova: Matilde
- Andrea Checchi: Camillo
- Gondrano Trucchi: the station master
- Bruno Corelli: the waiter
- Gabriele Tinti: the young man on the train
- Silvio Bagolini: the guide

=== Il Tamburino Sardo ===
- Enzo Cerusico: il tamburino
- Vittorio Vaser: il capitano
- Attilio Tosato: il sergente
- Guido Celano: il tenente
- Ugo Sasso: a soldier
- Yvonne Cocco: a nun
- Pietro Tordi: un infermiere

=== Questioni d'interesse ===
- Arnoldo Foà: il contadino
- Folco Lulli: l'altro contadino
- Mario Mazza: il carabiniere

=== L'idillio ===
- Maurizio Di Nardo: Guido
- Geraldina Parriniello: Filli
- Paolo Stoppa: Guido's father
- Rina Morelli: Guido's mother
- Sergio Tofano: Guido's grandfather
- Jone Morino: Maddalena

=== La morsa ===
- Amedeo Nazzari: Andrea Fabbri
- Elisa Cegani: Giulia, his wife
- Roldano Lupi: Antonio Serra, her lover
- Goliarda Sapienza: Anna, la domestica

=== Pot-pourri di canzoni ===
- Barbara Florian: the bride
- Elio Pandolfi: lo sposo
- Amalia Pellegrini: the grandmother
- Oscar Andriani: the father
- Elena Altieri: la moglie del maggiore
- Gian Aldo Bettoni: il maggiore

=== Il processo di Frine ===
- Gina Lollobrigida: Maria Antonia Desiderio
- Vittorio De Sica: l'avvocato difensore
- Arturo Bragaglia: il pubblico ministero
- Giovanni Grasso jr.: il presidente del tribunale
- Turi Pandolfini: primo cancelliere
- Armando Annuale: secondo cancelliere
- Vittorio Caprioli: il farmacista
- Dante Maggio: un testimone
- Umberto Sacripante
- Liana Del Balzo
- Alberto Talegalli
- Alfredo Rizzo
- Alberto Sorrentino

== Bibliography ==
- Diffrient, David Scott. Omnibus Films: Theorizing Transauthorial Cinema. Edinburgh University Press, 2014.
