= Destiny (1951 film) =

1951 film

- Directed by: Enzo Di Gianni
- Written by: Enzo Di Gianni
- Produced by: Esposito Vicenzo
- Starring: Eva Nova; Renato Valente; Lilia Landi
- Cinematography: Raffaele Masciocchi; Augusto Tiezzi
- Production company: Eva Film
- Distributed by: Variety Distribution
- Release date: 9 September 1951
- Running time: 84 minutes
- Country: Italy
- Language: Italian

Destiny (Italian: Destino) is a 1951 Italian melodrama film directed by Enzo Di Gianni and starring Eva Nova, Renato Valente and Lilia Landi.

The film's sets were designed by Enzo Trapani.

== Cast ==
- Eva Nova as Elena Martini
- Renato Valente as Bruno
- Lilia Landi as Sonia
- Mario Vitale as Franco Borielli
- Agostino Salvietti as Papa' Ciocchetti
- Loris Gizzi as Filippo Borcello
- Michele Malaspina as L'avvocato Giorgio Bariello
- Tina Pica as Nunziata
- Amedeo Trilli as Il frate
- Giulia Lazzarini as Anna Maria
- Domenico Modugno as Turiddu
- Silvana Muzi as L'infermiera
- Salvatore Furnari as Il nano Sansone

== Bibliography ==
- Morreale, Emiliano (2011). Così piangevano: il cinema melò nell'Italia degli anni Cinquanta. Donzelli Editore. ISBN 978-88-6036-582-8.
