= Giorgio Bianchi (director) =

Italian film director and actor (1904-1967)

- Born: 18 February 1904; Rome, Italy
- Died: 9 February 1967 (aged 62); Rome, Italy

Giorgio Bianchi (18 February 1904 – 9 February 1967) was an Italian film director and actor.

== Selected filmography ==
- Mother Earth (1931)
- Resurrection (1931)
- The Charmer (1931)
- Before the Jury (1931)
- The Blue Fleet (1932)
- Two Happy Hearts (1932)
- Five to Nil (1932)
- Venus (1932)
- Saint John, the Beheaded (1940)
- The Little Teacher (1942)
- A Little Wife (1943)
- Crime News (1947)
- Twenty Years (1949)
- Hearts at Sea (1950)
- Porca miseria (1951)
- Il caimano del Piave (1951)
- Amor non ho... però... però (1951)
- The Enemy (1952)
- The Shadow (1954)
- Io piaccio (1955)
- Buonanotte... avvocato! (1955)
- Count Max (1957)
- Vacations in Majorca (1959)
- The Moralist (1959)
- Le olimpiadi dei mariti (1960)
- Femmine di lusso (1960)
- The Orderly (1961)
- Il mio amico Benito (1962)
- Toto and Peppino Divided in Berlin (1962)
- The Changing of the Guard (1962)
- I 4 tassisti (1963)
- Sedotti e bidonati (1964)
