= Abracadabra (1952 film) =

1952 film by Max Neufeld

- Italian film poster
- Directed by: Max Neufeld
- Written by: Goffredo Gustavino; Mario Massa
- Produced by: Raffaele Colamonici; Umberto Montesi
- Starring: Mario Riva; Riccardo Billi; Lilia Landi
- Cinematography: Vincenzo Seratrice
- Edited by: Marcella Gengarelli
- Music by: Tarcisio Fusco
- Production company: Colamonici Montesi Film
- Distributed by: Regionale Distribuzione
- Release date: 22 February 1952
- Running time: 92 minutes
- Country: Italy
- Language: Italian

Abracadabra is a 1952 Italian comedy film directed by Max Neufeld and starring Mario Riva, Riccardo Billi and Lilia Landi. It was shot at Cinecittà Studios in Rome. The film's sets were designed by the art directors Alfredo Montori and Camillo del Signore.

== Plot ==
Three crooks scheme to swindle a wealthy widow out of her fortune, but their plans are thwarted by the sudden return of her husband who is far from dead.

== Cast ==
- Mario Riva as Amleto
- Riccardo Billi as Antonio
- Lilia Landi as Carmela
- Guglielmo Inglese as Nicola Caiazzo
- Alberto Sorrentino as Fernando, detto Fefè
- Paul Muller as Alfredo
- Marcella Rovena as Cesira Caiazzo
- Simona Gori as Maria
- Clely Fiamma as Antonietta
- Marco Tulli as Il maggiordomo
- Silvio Bagolini as Il signore balbuziente
- Bruno Corelli as Il Decio
- Pietro Tordi as Giacomo
