= Ring Around the Clock =

1950 film

- Directed by: Paolo William Tamburella
- Written by: Gian Paolo Callegari; Jacopo Corsi; Beppe Costa; Guido Leoni; William Rospigliosi; Paolo William Tamburella
- Produced by: Sonio Coletti; Paolo William Tamburella
- Starring: Nando Bruno; Lauro Gazzolo; Peppino Spadaro
- Cinematography: Vincenzo Seratrice
- Edited by: Jolanda Benvenuti
- Music by: Alessandro Cicognini; G. Icini
- Production company: Alfa Cinematografica
- Distributed by: D.C.N.
- Release date: 12 April 1950
- Running time: 88 minutes
- Country: Italy
- Language: Italian

Ring Around the Clock (Italian: Vogliamoci bene!) is a 1950 Italian comedy film directed by Paolo William Tamburella and starring Nando Bruno, Lauro Gazzolo, and Peppino Spadaro.

The film's sets were designed by Arrigo Equini.

== Plot ==
A dispute breaks out in a small town over planned repairs to the historic clock.

== Cast ==
- Nando Bruno as Parboni
- Lauro Gazzolo as Guerrieri
- Mario Nicotra as Police Chief
- Peppino Spadaro as Don Paolo
- Arturo Bragaglia as Mayor
- Paolo Stoppa as Rocchetti
- Patrizia Mangano as Luisa
- Gemma Bolognesi
- Margherita Bossi as Signora Contonieri
- Agostino Carucci as Francesco
- Marga Cella as Signorina Guerrieri
- Bruno Corelli
- Alfred De Leo as Gino Maruchelli
- Carlo Delle Piane as Vincenzo
- Attilio Dottesio as Mario
- Vittoria Febbi
- Aristide Garbini as Bruno
- Leda Gloria as Rosa
- Zoe Incrocci as Concettina
- Renato Malavasi as Capobanda
- Nino Marchetti as Giulio
- Mario Mazza as De Mori
- Renato Micali as Sub-Chief
- John Pasetti as Alfred
- Arturo Pasquali as Silvestri
- Amina Pirani Maggi
- Franco Solva as Alfredo
- Pietro Tordi as Fausto

== Bibliography ==
- Ann C. Paietta. Saints, Clergy and Other Religious Figures on Film and Television, 1895–2003. McFarland, 2005.
