= My Seven Little Sins =

- Directed by: Jean Boyer
- Written by: Jean Boyer; Aldo De Benedetti; Jean des Vallières; Serge Véber
- Starring: Maurice Chevalier; Delia Scala
- Cinematography: Charles Suin
- Edited by: André Laurent
- Music by: Fred Freed
- Release date: 29 December 1954
- Running time: 98 minutes
- Countries: France; Italy
- Language: French

My Seven Little Sins (French: J'avais sept filles, Italian: I sette peccati di papà), released in UK as I Had Seven Daughters, is a 1954 French-Italian comedy film co-written and directed by Jean Boyer and starring Maurice Chevalier and Delia Scala. It is based on a comedy play of Aldo De Benedetti, previously adapted by Nunzio Malasomma in the film We Were Seven Sisters.

== Cast ==
- Maurice Chevalier as Count André de Courvallon
- Delia Scala as Luisella
- Colette Ripert as Linda
- Maria Frau as Lolita
- Annick Tanguy as Nadine
- Luciana Paluzzi as Pat
- Maria-Luisa Da Silva as Blachette
- Gaby Basset as Maria
- Paolo Stoppa as Antonio
- Fred Pasquali as Professor Gorbiggi
