= Delia Scala =

Italian actress

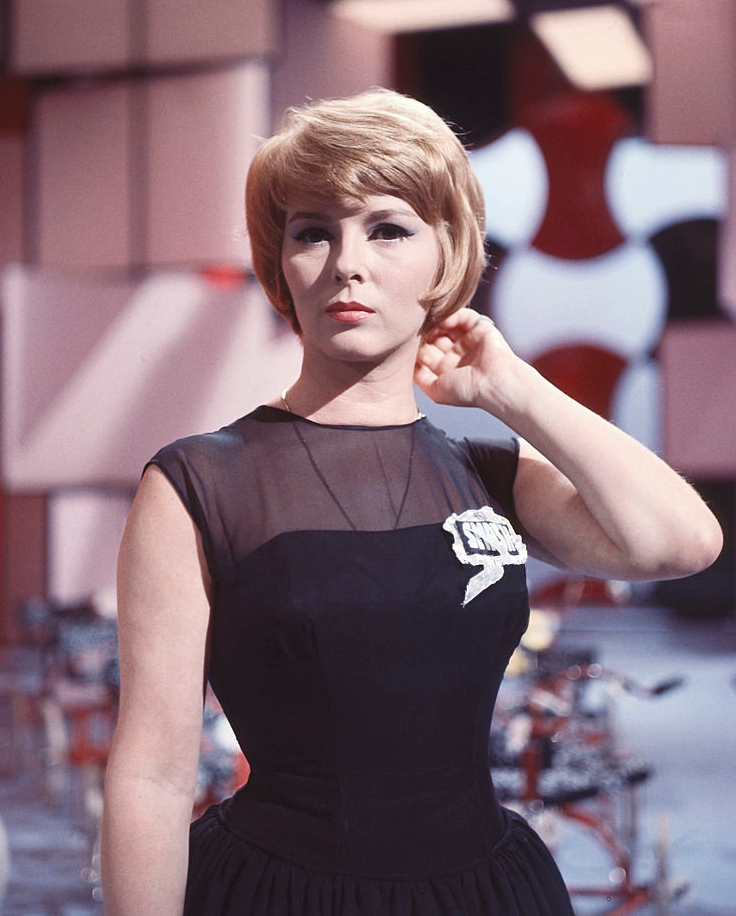
- Scala in 1963
- Born: Odette Bedogni; 25 September 1929; Bracciano, Lazio, Italy
- Died: 15 January 2004 (aged 74); Livorno, Tuscany, Italy
- Occupations: Actress; singer; dancer

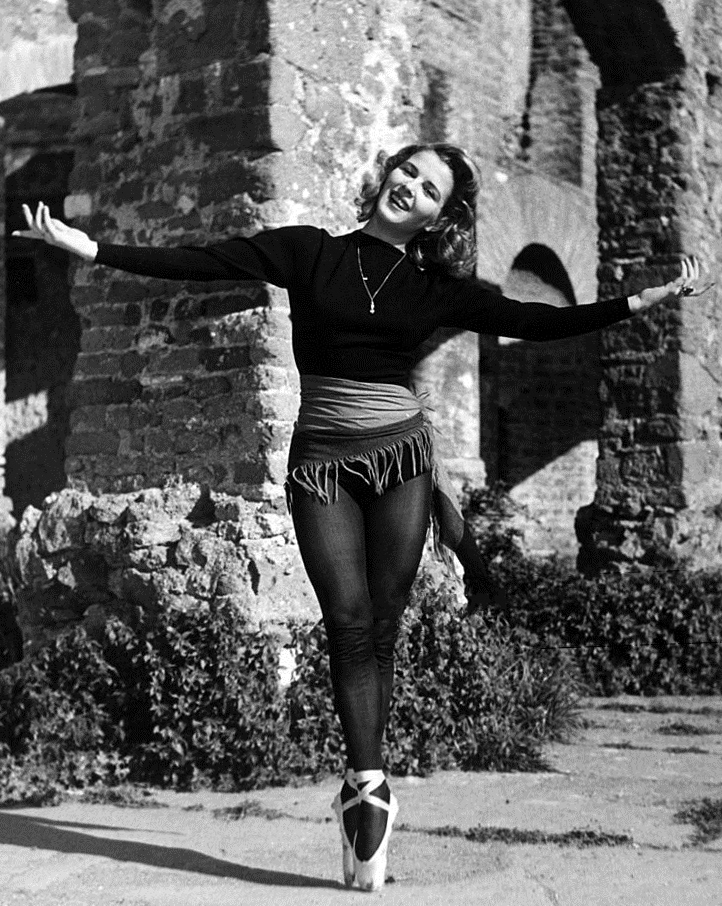
Delia Scala, 1951

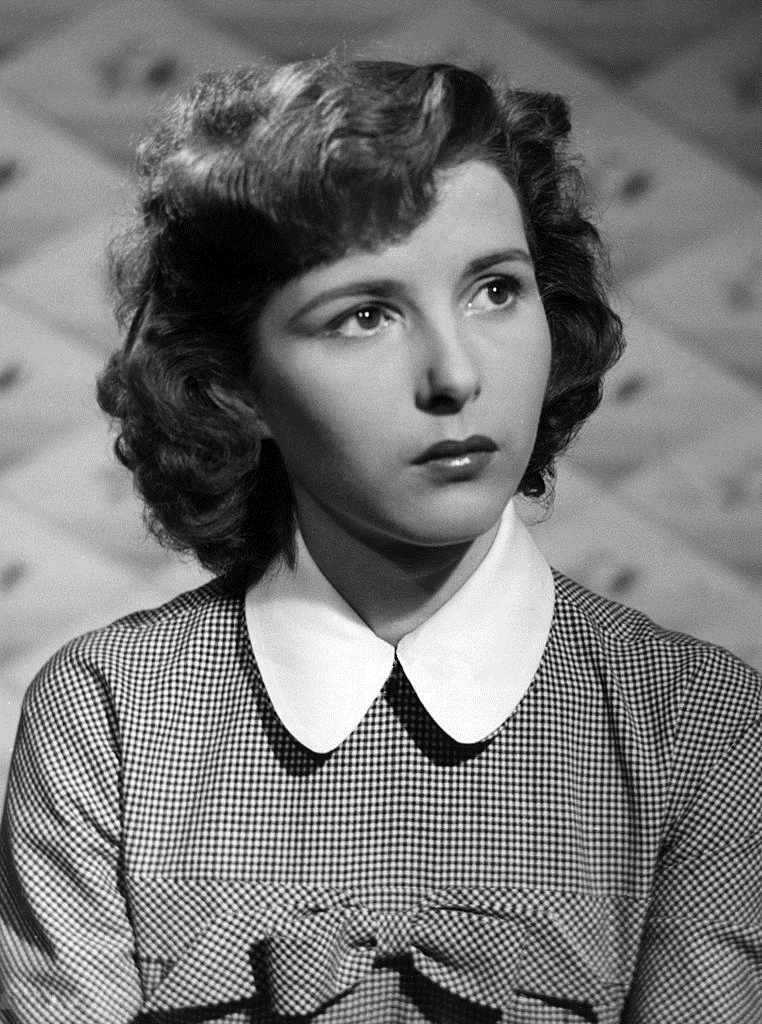
Delia Scala, 1950

Delia Scala (born Odette Bedogni; 25 September 1929 – 15 January 2004) was an Italian ballerina, actress and singer who played a leading role in the nascent commedia musicale.

== Career ==
Scala was born as Odette Bedogni in Bracciano, Lazio, Italy. When she was a young girl, her family moved to Milan where she studied ballet at "La Scala" Ballet School for seven years. She performed in numerous ballets until World War II, after which she began appearing in motion pictures using the stage name, Delia Scala. These include Difficult Years (Anni difficili, 1948), Side Street Story (Napoli milionaria, 1950), Rome 11:00 (Roma ore 11, 1952), Touchez pas au grisbi (1954), Gentlemen Are Born (Signori si nasce, 1960).

In 1954 Delia made her theatre debut with Giove in doppiopetto (Double-breasted Jupiter). The show is considered the first "Commedia musicale", an italian musical genre created by playwrights Pietro Garinei and Sandro Giovannini with the collaboration of the musician and songwriter Gorni Kramer. Scala later starred in Buonanotte Bettina (Goodnight Bettina, 1956) with Walter Chiari, L'adorabile Giulio (The Adorable Giulio, 1957) with Carlo Dapporto, Un trapezio per Lisistrata (A Trapeze for Lisistrata, 1958) with Nino Manfredi and Paolo Panelli, Delia Scala Show (1960), Rinaldo in campo (Rinaldo into the Field, 1961) with Domenico Modugno, My Fair Lady (1964) with Gianrico Tedeschi and Mario Carotenuto, and Il giorno della tartaruga (The Day of the Turtle, 1965) with Renato Rascel.

In 1956 Scala appeared in the TV show Lui e Lei (Him and Her, 1956) with Nino Taranto. In 1959–60 she co-hosted Canzonissima with Nino Manfredi and Paolo Panelli.

After twelve consecutive years of performances in Italy and Europe, Scala began to experience fatigue. In 1965, at the height of her success (she had received offers from Broadway), she suddenly decided to drop out from live performances. In 1966 she married and temporarily retired to spend time with her family.

In 1968 Scala made a comeback with Delia Scala Story, a show written by Garinei and Giovannini. This was followed in 1970 by the very successful Signore e signora (Mr. and Madame) with Lando Buzzanca. After a nine-year break, she starred in the show Che combinazione (What a Coincidence) alongside Don Lurio.

From 1980 to 1983, Scala conceived and hosted the show Una rosa per la Vita (A Rose for Life) to raise funds to support cancer prevention and research at the Bussoladomani arena in Lido di Camaiore, together with Raimondo Vianello and Sandra Mondaini, .

In 1982 Scala returned to television with the RAI fiction Casa Cecilia (Cecilia's Home), where she performed for three seasons. Her final TV role was in the sitcom Io e la mamma, (Mum and I) aired between 1996 and 1998 on Canale 5.

== Personal life ==
Scala achieved great professional success, but her personal life was marred by misfortune and tragedy. In 1946, at the age 17, she married a Greek military officer who had come to Italy to join the partisan forces in the fight against the Nazi-fascists. They separated two years later, and she got the marriage voided in 1956.

During the mid-1950s Scala was engaged with Formula One race car driver Eugenio Castellotti. He died in 1957 when his Ferrari crashed while attempting a speed record at the Modena race track.

In 1967 she married Piero Giannotti.The marriage lasted until 1982 when Giannotti died of a heart attack while cycling along the beach in Viareggio. She married a third time in 1985 with industrialist Arturo Fremura. The marriage ended with her husband's death of liver cancer in 2001.

In 1974 Delia Scala was diagnosed with breast cancer, and underwent a radical mastectomy. Although she appeared to have made a full recovery, in 2002 she was struck again with the same illness. Scala died in 2004 in Livorno, Tuscany. She rests in the Cimitero della Misericordia in Livorno.

At the time of her death, Italian President Carlo Azeglio Ciampi called her a "model of enthusiasm and rigorous professionalism" and said he rated her among "the most beloved and popular artists in the history of Italian entertainment".

== Credits ==
=== Stage ===
Year	Show	Role(s)	Notes
1937	La Boutique fantasque	Dancer	Teatro alla Scala, April 1937
1937	The Sleeping Beauty	Dancer	Teatro alla Scala, October 1937
1940	Zazà	Dufresne's daughter	Teatro alla Scala, April 1940
1954	Giove in doppiopetto	Lia	Teatro Lirico, September 1954
1956	Buonanotte Bettina	Bettina	Teatro Alfieri, November–December 1956
1957	The Tempest	Ariel	Palazzo Giusti, July 1957
1957	L'adorabile Giulio	Penny	Teatro Sistina, November 1957
1958	Un trapezio per Lisistrata	Lisistrata	Teatro Sistina, October 1958
1961	Delia Scala Show	Herself	Teatro Biondo, March 1961
1961	Rinaldo in campo	Angelica	Teatro Alfieri, September 1961
1963	My Fair Lady	Eliza Doolittle	Teatro Nuovo, November 1963
1964	Il giorno della tartaruga	Maria / Maria's mother / Federica	Teatro Sistina, October 1964

=== Film ===
Year	Title	Role(s)	Notes
1943	Principessina	Classmate	Cameo appearance
1947	Difficult Years	Elena	
1948	L'eroe della strada	Giulietta Marchi	
1949	Ti ritroverò	Maria Riva	
1950	How I Discovered America	Lisa	
1950	Side Street Story	Maria Rosaria	
1950	A Dog's Life	Vera	
1950	The Cliff of Sin	Anna	
1951	Beauties on Bicycles	Delia	
1951	Song of Spring	Rosetta	
1951	Cameriera bella presenza offresi…	Wife	Cameo appearance
1951	Auguri e figli maschi!	Silvana Sostacchini	
1951	The Steamship Owner	Herself	Although playing herself, she's the lead actress
1951	Messalina	Cinzia	
1951	Appointment for Murder	Silvia Pietrangeli	
1952	I'm the Hero	Silvia	
1952	Rome 11:00	Angelina	
1952	The Dream of Zorro	Estrella	
1952	Giovinezza	Tamara	
1952	Ragazze da marito	Gabriella	
1952	The Flame	Teresa Derrieux	
1953	Matrimonial Agency	Mitzi	
1953	Gioventù alla sbarra	Franca	
1953	Viva il cinema!	Palmina	
1953	Cavalcade of Song	Titina	Segment: "Io cerco la Titina"
1954	Public Opinion	Lauretta	
1954	Di qua, di là del Piave	Angiolina	Segment: "Angiolina, bella Angiolina"
1954	Gran varietà	The Dancer	Segment: "Il fine dicitore"
1954	Cañas y barro	Marieta	
1954	Before the Deluge	Josette	
1954	Touchez pas au grisbi	Hughette	
1954	My Seven Little Sins	Luisella	
1955	Magic Village	Agatina	
1956	Goubbiah, mon amour	Trinida	
1960	Terror in Oklahoma	Betsabea	
1960	Gentlemen Are Born	Patrizia	
1960	I Teddyboys della canzone	Delia Amato	
1960	Madri pericolose	Maura Ornano	
1960	Le olimpiadi dei mariti	Delia	Final film role

=== Television ===
Year	Title	Role(s)	Notes
1956	Lui e lei	Herself / co-host	Talk show
1959–1960	Canzonissima	Herself / Host	Variety/musical show (season 2)
1961	La padrona di Raggio di Luna	Marta Gray	Television movie
1968	Delia Scala Story	Herself / Host	Variety show
1970	Signore e signora	Herself / Host	Variety show
1972	Colazione allo studio sette	Herself / Host	Variety show
1975	Tanto piacere	Herself / Guest	Talk show
1978–1979	Che combinazione	Herself / Host	Variety show (season 1)
1982–1987	Casa Cecilia	Cecilia	Lead role
1987	Telegatto 1987	Herself / Host	Annual ceremony
1997–1998	Io e la mamma	Delia, the mother	Co-lead role (final television role)

=== Radio ===
Year	Title	Role(s)	Notes
1972	The Mistress of the Inn	Mirandolina	Radio poscast
