= Robin Hood and the Pirates =

- Directed by: Giorgio Simonelli
- Screenplay by: Edoardo Anton; Leo Bomba; Marcello Ciorciolini; Carlo Infascelli; Enrico Spadorcia
- Story by: Carlo Infascelli
- Produced by: Leo Bomba; Carlo Infascelli
- Starring: Lex Barker; Jocelyn Lane; Rossana Rory; Mario Scaccia
- Cinematography: Raffaele Masciocchi
- Edited by: Dolores Tamburini
- Music by: Guido Robuschi
- Production company: Finanziaria Cinematografica Italiana
- Release date: 24 December 1960 (Italy)
- Country: Italy

Robin Hood and the Pirates (Italian: Robin Hood e i pirati) is a 1960 Italian adventure film directed by Giorgio Simonelli, and starring Lex Barker and Jackie Lane.

== Plot ==
Robin Hood, the protagonist, leaves Sherwood Forest, and joins the pirates. After several fights and many adventures, he gets bored, and decides to return to his homeland. He discovers that his father has been killed, and that a usurper has taken the throne. He begins his life as fighter who defends the poor against the rich.

== Cast ==
- Lex Barker as Robin Hood
- Jackie Lane as Kareen Blain
- Rossana Rory as Lizbeth Brooks
- Mario Scaccia as Jonathan Brooks
- Walter Barnes as Guercio / Orbo
- Edith Peters as Palla di Grasso
- Giulio Donnini as Golia
- Renato Chiantoni as Gladiacove
- Mario Passante as Brooks' friend
- Marco Tulli as Friar Lorenzo
- Gino Buzzanca as Captain Uncini
- Umberto Sacripante as Philips
- Renato Terra as Barbanera

== Release ==
Robin Hood and the Pirates was released in Italy on 24 December 1960. The film was released in the United States in 1964.
