= Licenza premio =

- Italian theatrical release poster
- Directed by: Max Neufeld
- Written by: Vittorio Metz; Marcello Marchesi
- Produced by: Raffaele Colamonici; Umberto Montesi
- Starring: Nino Taranto; Carlo Croccolo
- Cinematography: Francesco Izzarelli
- Edited by: Fernando Tropea
- Music by: Cesare Andrea Bixio
- Distributed by: Colamonici Montesi
- Release date: 8 September 1951
- Running time: 81 minutes
- Country: Italy
- Language: Italian

Licenza premio is a 1951 Italian comedy film directed by Max Neufeld and starring Nino Taranto and Carlo Croccolo.

== Plot ==
Italy, early 1950s. Two troopers, Domenico, Neapolitan, and Pinozzo, Piedmontese, are sent on a special mission: they must lead to Rome a mare of their lieutenant, who will participate in the international horse show.

== Cast ==
- Nino Taranto: Domenico Errichiello
- Carlo Croccolo: Pinozzo Molliconi
- Virgilio Riento: Enrico
- Lilia Landi: Maria Luisa
- Nerio Bernardi: Count Carlo
- Rossana Rory: Paola
- Marcella Rovena: Zingara
- Pietro Tordi: Zingaro
- Virginia Belmont: Gilda

== Release ==
The film was released in Italy on September 8, 1951
