= Irene Genna =

Italian film and television actress

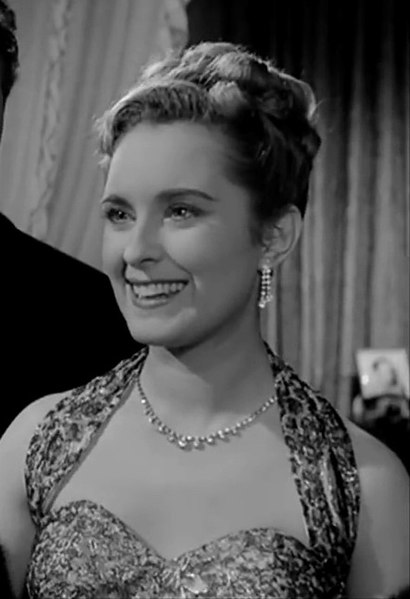
- Born: 4 January 1931; Athens, Greece
- Died: 6 February 1986 (aged 55); Rome, Italy
- Occupation: Actress
- Spouse: Amedeo Nazzari
- Children: Evelina Nazzari (actress)

Irene Genna (4 January 1931 – 6 February 1986) was an Italian film and television actress.

== Life and career ==
Born in Athens by an Italian father and a Greek mother, Genna made her high school studies in Greece, then she moved to Italy with her family. In Rome she enrolled at the school of the Teatro dell'Opera di Roma and she followed the acting courses held by actress Teresa Franchini.

Genna debuted at a very young age in Mario Mattoli's The Two Orphans. She had her breakout in 1949, with Renato Castellani's neorealist post-war drama It's Forever Springtime, in which she also had her first major role. In spite of the critical appreciation she received, Genna's career mainly continued in less ambitious productions, including several RAI TV-series. In 1957 Genna married Amedeo Nazzari with whom she had a daughter, Evelina, also an actress, and she retired from show business.

== Selected filmography ==
- It's Forever Springtime (1950)
- The Bread Peddler (1950)
- Born of Unknown Father (1950)
- Verginità (1952)
- Papà ti ricordo (1952)
- Martin Toccaferro (1953)
- Verdi, the King of Melody (1953)
- Past Lovers (1953)
- Finalmente libero! (1954)
- The Slave of Sin (1954)
