= Tina De Mola =

Italian actress, singer, and television personality

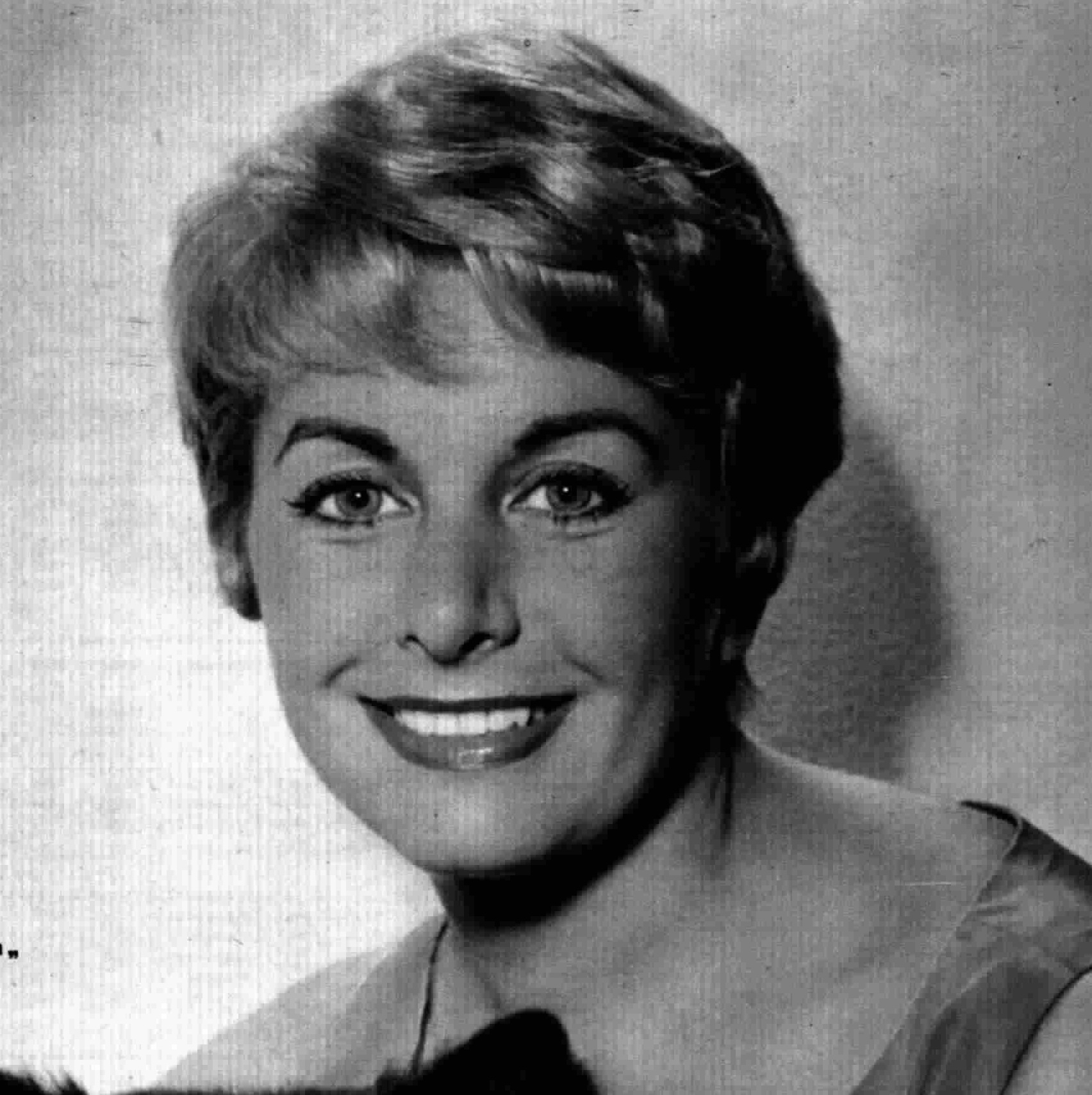
- Born: 28 October 1923; Milan, Kingdom of Italy
- Died: 18 April 2012 (aged 88); Rome, Italy
- Occupation: Actress

Ernesta De Mola, best known as Tina De Mola (28 October 1923 – 18 April 2012), was an Italian actress, singer and television personality.

== Life and career ==
Born in Milan, De Mola was the daughter of a barber. After winning a contest for new voices in 1941, she started her career as singer-actress with several avanspettacolo companies. In 1942, she met Renato Rascel, and soon she became his wife and the primadonna in his revue company. That same year she made her film debut, in Giacomo Gentilomo's Pazzo d'amore. In 1946, De Mola participated to the Miss Italia beauty contest, getting the title of "Miss Sorriso D'Italia". After working on stage with the companies led by Erminio Macario, Ugo Tognazzi and Mario Carotenuto, she successfully toured South America with a program of Italian music. From 1955 onwards, she also became a central figure in the early Italian television, as a hostess and soubrette in a number of variety shows. De Mola and Rascel obtained the Roman Rota's annulment of marriage in 1963, and De Mola remarried in 1971.

== Filmography ==
Year	Title	Role	Notes
1942	Pazzo d'amore	Elena	
1949	The Merry Widower	La maestrina	
1950	Cintura di castità		
1953	Attanasio cavallo vanesio	Lea	
1954	Alvaro piuttosto corsaro	Isabella Alcantara	
1955	I pinguini ci guardano		
1958	March's Child	Nella	
1959	The Sheriff	Dolly - the singer	(final film role)
