= Porca miseria =

Porca Miseria
- Directed by: Giorgio Bianchi
- Written by: Eduardo De Filippo; Ruggero Maccari
- Cinematography: Giovanni Ventimiglia
- Music by: Pippo Barzizza
- Distributed by: Variety Distribution
- Release date: 1951
- Country: Italy
- Language: Italian

Porca Miseria is a 1951 Italian comedy film directed by Giorgio Bianchi.

== Plot ==
Two friends, Giacomino and Carletto, have no job and no money and are looking for a job, or any device that will help them to meet expenses and especially will give them the opportunity to fill their stomachs. After several misadventures, they seem reduced to despair, but a ray of hope appears on the horizon. The two learn of a variety show they could participate in, if only they had a companion, a girl with a nice pair of legs. Their early searches are unsuccessful, but then their salvation appears in the guise of a poor and beautiful roommate whom the landlady kicked out for not paying the rent. The trio is hired, but because of the ineptitude of Jack, the show ends in disaster and the two friends, hungrier than ever, must flee with their new partner. In the course of their further adventures, the two friends fall in love with the girl and each believes he is the favorite. They are both greatly disappointed when they come to understand that another, third man, is the one who makes the girl happy.

== Cast ==
- Carlo Croccolo : Carletto
- Francesco Golisano : Giacomino
- Isa Barzizza : Jenny
- Giacomo Rondinella : Mario
- Carlo Campanini : Agenore
- Riccardo Billi : Trafficone
- Mario Riva : Count Cerri
- Virgilio Riento : Butler
- Nyta Dover : Emma
- Tina Pica : Rosa
- Dina Perbellini : Miss Moretti
- Gigi Schneider : Lella's Boyfriend

== See also ==
- Those Two (1935)
