= Pietro Tordi =

Italian actor

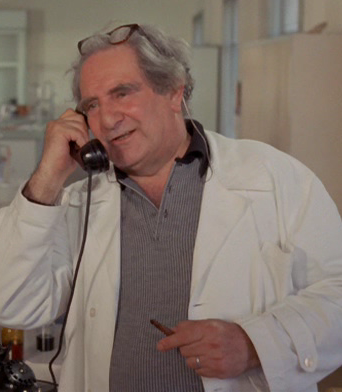
- Pietro Tordi in In the Name of the Italian People (1971)
- Born: 12 July 1906; Florence, Italy
- Died: 14 December 1990 (aged 84)
- Occupation: Actor
- Years active: 1942–1988

Pietro Tordi (12 July 1906 – 14 December 1990) was an Italian film actor. He appeared in 100 films between 1942 and 1988. He was born in Florence, Italy.

== Selected filmography ==
- Doctor Antonio (1937) - L'altro conspiratore
- Don Cesare di Bazan (1942) - Uno dei finti attori
- Pazzo d'amore (1942) - Giovannone
- Dagli Appennini alle Ande (1943) - Ulano, un contadino
- I nostri sogni (1943) - Il macchinista electricista (uncredited)
- The Walls of Malapaga (1949) - (uncredited)
- Il falco rosso (1949) - Demetrio
- Captain Demonio (1950)
- Son of d'Artagnan (1950)
- Ring Around the Clock (1950) - Fausto
- Figaro Here, Figaro There (1950) - Fiorello
- Il monello della strada (1950) - Zeno
- Strano appuntamento (1950)
- Quo Vadis (1951) - Galba
- Attention! Bandits! (1951) - Diplomat
- O.K. Nerone (1951) - Gladiator of Gaul
- The Seven Dwarfs to the Rescue (1951)
- Messalina (1951) - Un ceffo della suburra / Un malfrat des bas-quartiers (uncredited)
- Napoleon (1951) - Enrico
- Licenza premio (1951) - Zingaro
- The Mistress of Treves (1952) - Orso
- Abracadabra (1952) - Giacomo
- Rome 11:00 (1952) - The Architect
- Red Shirts (1952) - Carlo Ferrari
- Deceit (1952) - L'altro complice della baronessa
- In Olden Days (1952)
- The Queen of Sheba (1952) - Onabar
- Carne inquieta (1952)
- Il prezzo dell'onore (1953)
- I Chose Love (1953)
- Ivan (il figlio del diavolo bianco) (1953)
- Di qua, di là del Piave (1954)
- The Captain of Venice (1954) - Conte Gritti
- Crossed Swords (1954) - The Duke
- Guai ai vinti (1954) - (uncredited)
- Days of Love (1954) - Il parroco
- La grande avventura (1954)
- Toto in Hell (1955) - Il vero pazzo
- Adriana Lecouvreur (1955)
- The Miller's Beautiful Wife (1955) - Sergente ubriaco
- Te sto aspettanno (1956) - Capotecnico
- I miliardari (1956) - Il portiere
- Roland the Mighty (1956) - Ubaldo
- Porta un bacione a Firenze (1956) - Pascucci
- Kean - Genio e sregolatezza (1957) - Cochrane
- The Dragon's Blood (1957)
- Il cavaliere senza terra (1957)
- Il mondo dei miracoli (1959)
- Un maledetto imbroglio (1959) - The Motel Manager
- Ben Hur (1959) - Pilate's Servant (uncredited)
- I baccanali di Tiberio (1960)
- The Huns (1960) - Morobas
- The Giants of Thessaly (1960) - Telamone
- Le ambiziose (1961)
- The Story of Joseph and His Brethren (1961) - Enemy (uncredited)
- Divorce Italian Style (1961) - Attorney De Marzi
- Gladiator of Rome (1962) - Slave guard Cassio
- Musketeers of the Sea (1962) - Il Nostromo
- Appuntamento in Riviera (1962)
- Rocambole (1963) - Le Préfet de police
- Mad Sea (1963) - Il Poeta
- Le monachine (1963)
- Hercules, Samson and Ulysses (1963) - Azer
- Brennus, Enemy of Rome (1963) - Vaxo
- The Thief of Damascus (1964)
- I marziani hanno 12 mani (1964) - Contadino abruzzese
- Devil of the Desert Against the Son of Hercules (1964) - Bidder at Auction in Red Turbant
- The Road to Fort Alamo (1964) - Bartender (uncredited)
- Minnesota Clay (1964)
- Man Called Gringo (1965) - Sam Martin
- Marvelous Angelique (1965) - Le grand Coërse
- Letti sbagliati (1965) - Il professor Vittorio Foconi (segment "Il complicato")
- La colt è la mia legge (1965) - Doc
- Latin Lovers (1965) - (segment "L'irreparabile")
- Sette contro tutti (1965)
- Fantômas se déchaîne (1965) - Le président de l'Assemblée
- Mondo pazzo... gente matta! (1966) - General Manager
- Seasons of Our Love (1966) - Mario Borghi
- Missione sabbie roventi (1966)
- For a Few Dollars Less (1966) - Black
- Arizona Colt (1966) - Oriest
- Rojo (1966) - Saloon Customer
- Wanted (1967) - Pete Collins - Barman (uncredited)
- Luana, the Girl Tarzan (1968) - Norman
- Uno di più all'inferno (1968) - Pastor Steve
- The Son of Black Eagle (1968)
- Torture Me But Kill Me with Kisses (1968) - Fra' Arduino
- Buona Sera, Mrs. Campbell (1968) - Priest (uncredited)
- Italiani! È severamente proibito servirsi della toilette durante le fermate (1969)
- Le lys de mer (1969)
- Franco, Ciccio e il pirata Barbanera (1969) - Il Pirata John
- Kill Django... Kill First (1971) - Le shérif
- Secret Fantasy (1971) - Doctor
- In the Name of the Italian People (1971) - Professor Rivaroli
- The Beasts (1971) - Lawyer of Sparapaoli sisters (segment "Processo a porte chiuse")
- Il vero e il falso (1972) - Carabinieri Officier in Latina
- Lo chiameremo Andrea (1972)
- What? (1972) - Caretaker
- Decameroticus (1972) - Vulfardo - the judge
- We Want the Colonels (1973) - General Giovanni Bassi-Lega
- The Assassination of Matteotti (1973) - Zepelli - the Alta Corte del Senato President
- The Three Musketeers of the West (1973) - Dart senior
- Claretta and Ben (1974) - Old actor in Naples
- The Sex Machine (1975)
- La professoressa di lingue (1976) - col. Trombatore
- La pretora (1976) - Pavanin
- Puttana galera! (1976)
- Passi furtivi in una notte boia (1976) - Ragnini
- Lettomania (1976) - Hermann Tiller
- An Average Little Man (1977)
- Pane, burro e marmellata (1977) - The Priest (uncredited)
- How to Lose a Wife and Find a Lover (1978) - The Chaplain in the armed services
- Dear Father (1979) - Padre di albino
- Velvet Hands (1979)
- The Return of Casanova (1980)
- Lion of the Desert (1980) - Field Marshal
- Il Marchese del Grillo (1981) - Monsignor Terenzio
- Petomaniac (1983) - Principe D'Orleans
- Fotoromanzo (1986)
- Momo (1986) - Ettore
- Stradivari (1988) - Friar Mendicant
- I giorni randagi (1988) - Grandfather
- Dark Illness (1990)
