= Adelchi Bianchi =

Italian director, screenwriter, producer and cinematographer

- Born: 1918; Rome, Italy
- Died: 1968; Rome, Italy
- Occupation(s): Director, screenwriter

Adelchi Bianchi (1918 - 1968) was an Italian director, screenwriter, producer and cinematographer.

== Life and career ==
Born in Rome, Bianchi worked as a cinematographer on several short films in the 1940s and 1950s, often directed by Edmondo Cancellieri. Between 1951 and 1968 he produced, directed and partly wrote four films, dying shortly after ending the shooting of his last film.

== Filmography ==
- Beauties in Capri (1951)
- Past Lovers (1953)
- Vite perdute (1953)
- Buckaroo: The Winchester Does Not Forgive (1968)
