= Viva il cinema! =

- Directed by: Giorgio Baldaccini; Enzo Trapani
- Narrated by: Alberto Sordi
- Release date: 1952
- Country: Italy
- Language: Italian

Viva il cinema! is a 1952 Italian comedy film directed by Giorgio Baldaccini and Enzo Trapani.

== Cast ==
- Delia Scala as Palmina
- Fiorenzo Fiorentini as Tonino
- Virgilio Riento as Gambalesta
- Corrado Alba as Ugo
- Marilyn Buferd as Tina
- Carlo Campanini as Sé stesso
- Walter Chiari as Sé stesso
- Bruno Corelli as Mario
- Lianella Carell as Gertrude Edelweiss
- Carlo Dapporto as Ferdinando D'Alba
- Nyta Dover as Franca
- Jole Fierro as Paola
- Dante Maggio as Ciccillo
- Nino Manfredi as Amico di Tonino
- Lois Maxwell
- Marisa Merlini as Jacqueline
- Alberto Sorrentino as Giovanni
- Silvana Pampanini as Herself
- Enzo Cerusico
- Checco Durante
- Arnoldo Foà as Producer
- Guglielmo Inglese
- Luigi Pavese
- Enrico Luzi
- Enzo Maggio
- Paul Muller
- Rossana Podestà
- Luisa Rivelli
- Giacomo Rondinella
- Gisella Sofio
