= Michele Malaspina =

Italian actor and voice actor

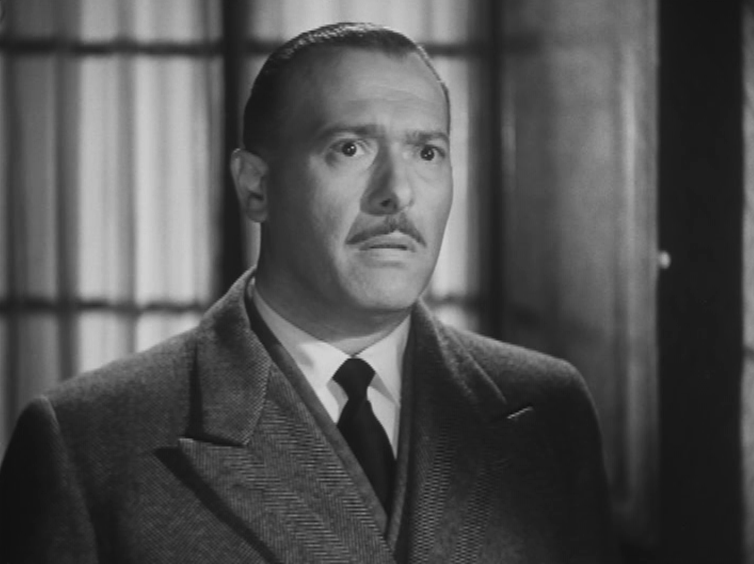
- Michele Malaspina as commendator Cantelli in A Dog's Life (1950)
- Born: 16 August 1908; Genoa, Italy
- Died: 13 January 1979 (aged 70); Rome, Italy

Michele Malaspina (16 August 1908 – 13 January 1979) was an Italian actor and voice actor.

== Life and career ==
Born in Bolzaneto, Genoa, the son of two shopkeepers, since childhood Malaspina has a passion for theater and was an actor in a company of amateur actors. At 18 years old, he entered the stage company of Alfredo Sainati, and from then he was part of the major stage companies of the time, notably the ones held by Emma Gramatica, Ermete Zacconi, Dina Galli, Ruggero Ruggeri and Camillo Pilotto. He made his film debut in the early 1930s, and during his long career he was mainly cast in supporting roles, being often used for playing high society characters. He worked for a long time at EIAR as an actor of radio-plays, and was also active as a dubber.

== Selected filmography ==
- The Knight of San Marco (1939)
- Lucky Night (1941)
- Once a Week (1942)
- His Young Wife (1945)
- Immigrants (1948)
- Heaven over the Marshes (1949)
- A Dog's Life (1950)
- Last Meeting (1951)
- The Counterfeiters (1951)
- Destiny (1951)
- The Shameless Sex (1952)
- Who is Without Sin (1952)
- Beauties in Capri (1952)
- Deceit (1952)
- The Dream of Zorro (1952)
- The Adventures of Mandrin (1952)
- Lieutenant Giorgio (1952)
- Sunday Heroes (1952)
- Past Lovers (1953)
- I cinque dell'Adamello (1954)
- Tragic Ballad (1954)
- The Pirate and the Slave Girl (1959)
- Two Sergeants of General Custer (1965)
- Due mafiosi contro Al Capone (1966)
- The Assassination of Matteotti (1973)
