= Eva Nova (singer) =

Italian singer and actress (1916–1996)

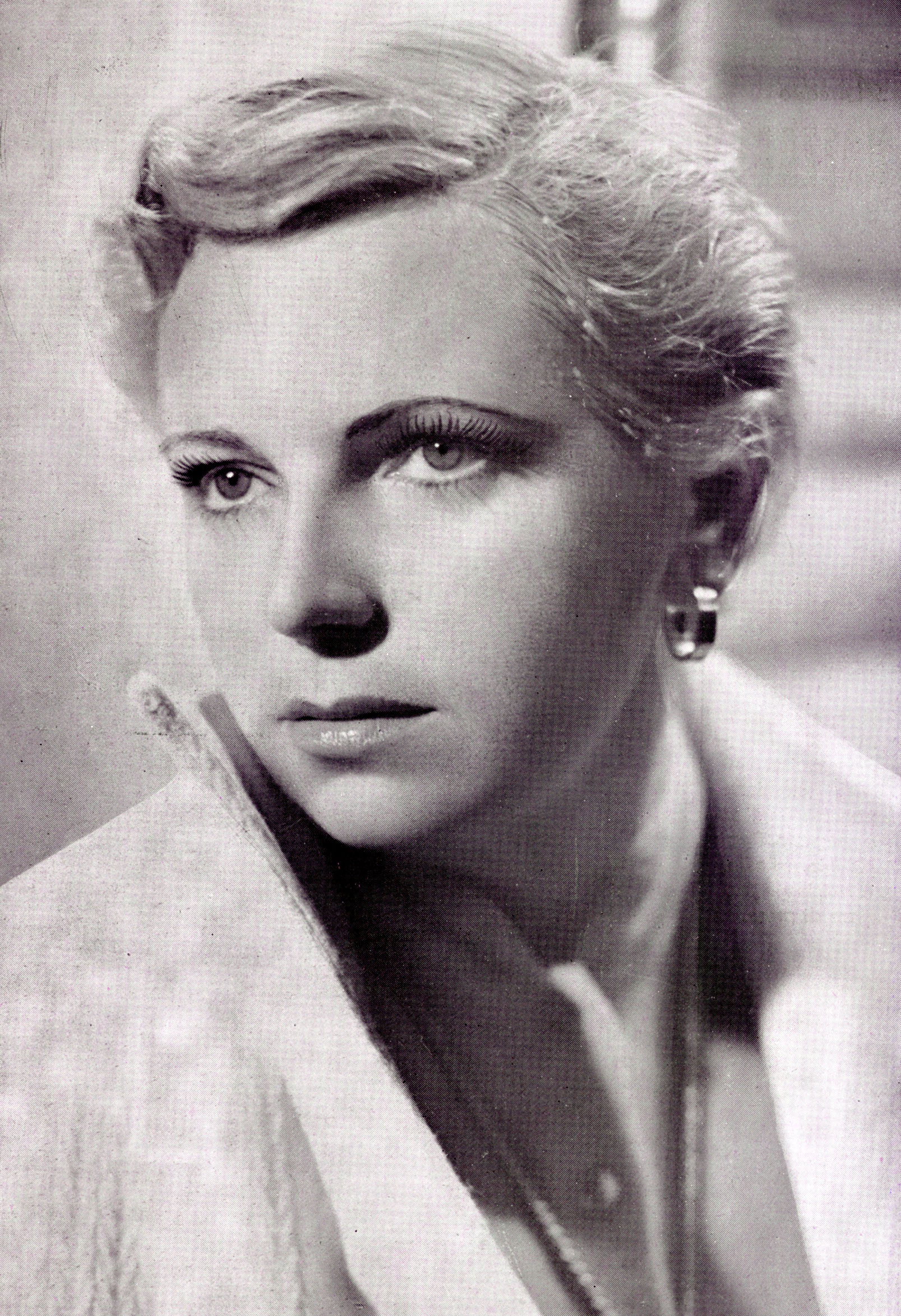
- Born: 31 December 1916; Naples, Campania, Italy
- Died: 30 November 1996 (aged 79); Rome, Lazio, Italy
- Occupations: Actress, singer
- Years active: 1949–1956 (film)

Eva Nova (1916–1996) was an Italian actress and singer. She appeared in leading roles in several films during the late 1940s and early 1950s.

== Filmography ==
- The Holy Nun (1949)
- Le due madonne (1949)
- Destiny (1951)
- Repentance (1952)
- Milanese in Naples (1954)
- Madonna delle rose (1954)
- Incatenata dal destino (1956)

== Bibliography ==
- Marlow-Mann, Alex. The New Neapolitan Cinema. Edinburgh University Press, 2011.
- Morreale, Emiliano. Così piangevano: il cinema melò nell'Italia degli anni Cinquanta. Donzelli Editore, 2011.
