= I morti non pagano tasse =

I Morti non pagano tasse
- Directed by: Sergio Grieco
- Written by: Nicola Manzari
- Produced by: Tino Scotti
- Cinematography: Renato Del Frate
- Edited by: Mario Serandrei
- Music by: Franco D'Achiardi
- Release date: 1952
- Country: Italy
- Language: Italian

I Morti non pagano tasse is a 1952 Italian comedy film by Sergio Grieco.

== Cast ==
- Tino Scotti: Marco Vecchietti / Giovanni Rossi
- Titina De Filippo: Geltrude
- Carlo Campanini: Il sindaco
- Clelia Matania: La signora Vecchietti
- Aroldo Tieri: Nicola
- Tino Buazzelli: Arturo
- Franca Marzi: Mariella
- Vinicio Sofia: Il direttore generale
- Guglielmo Inglese
- Luigi Bonos
