= Fourth Page =

1942 film

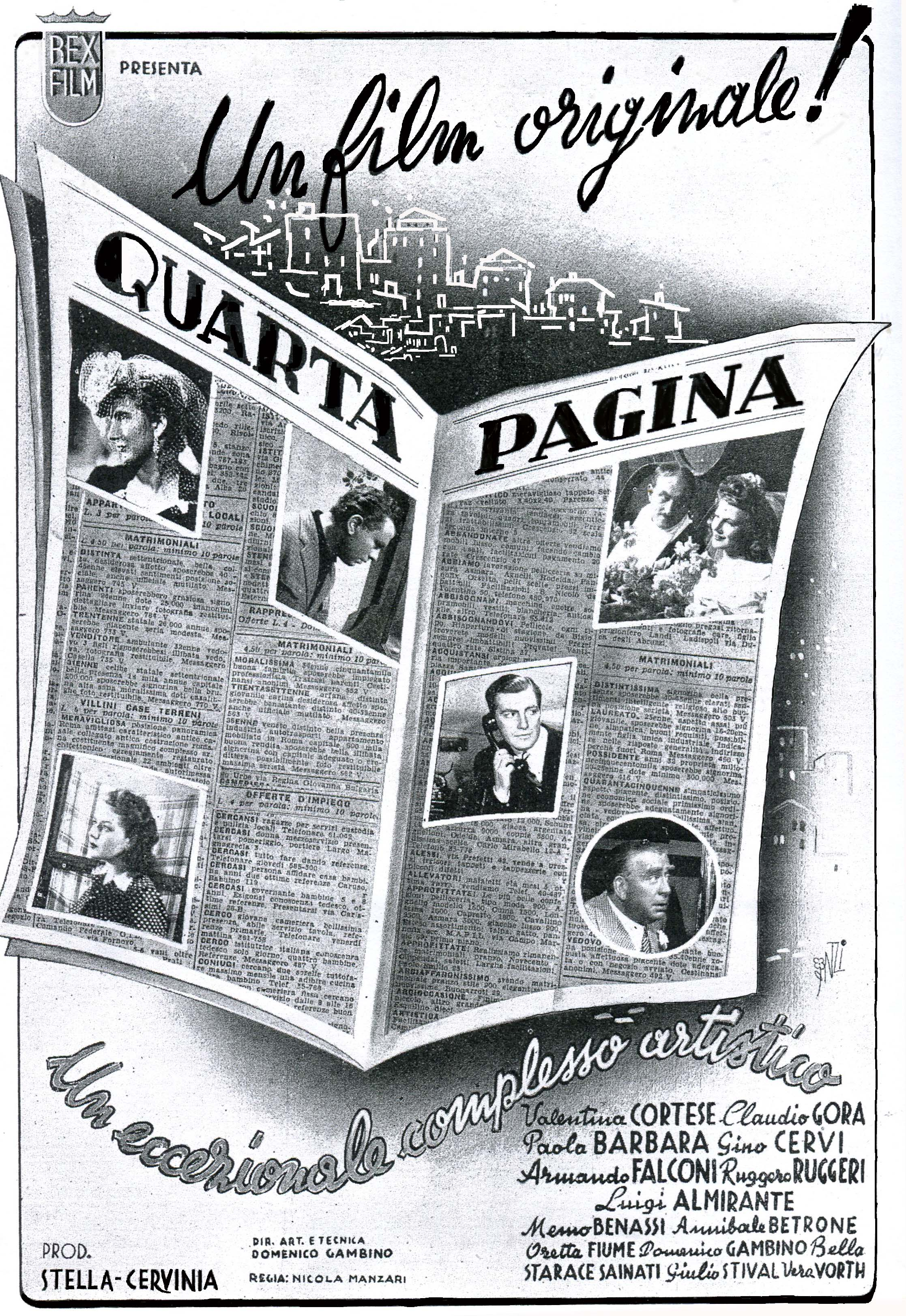
- Directed by: Nicola Manzari
- Written by: Edoardo Anton; Ugo Betti; Federico Fellini; Nicola Manzari; Spiro Manzari; Giuseppe Marotta; Ottavio Poggi; Gianni Puccini; Stefano Vanzina; Piero Tellini; Cesare Zavattini
- Produced by: Giulio Fabris
- Starring: Claudio Gora; Valentina Cortese; Paola Barbara
- Cinematography: Renato Del Frate; Giorgio Orsini
- Edited by: Fernando Tropea
- Music by: Alessandro Cicognini; Alexandre Derevitsky
- Production companies: Cervinia Film; Industrie Nazionali Associate Cinematografiche
- Distributed by: Rex Film
- Release date: 17 December 1942
- Running time: 90 minutes
- Country: Italy
- Language: Italian

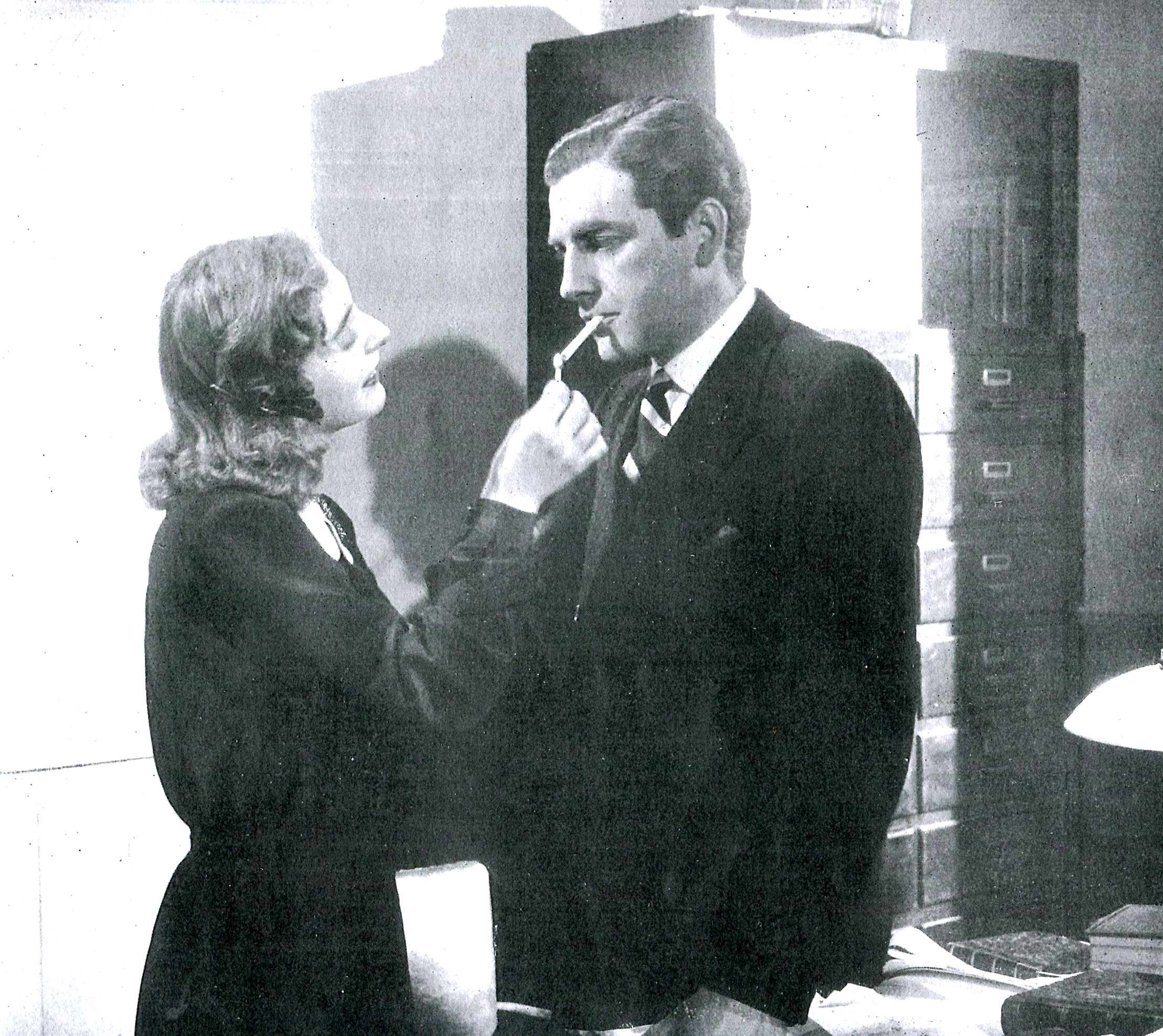
Cortese and Gora.

Fourth Page (Italian: Quarta pagina) is a 1942 Italian mystery film directed by Nicola Manzari and starring Claudio Gora, Valentina Cortese and Paola Barbara. It was shot at the FERT Studios in Turin. The film's sets were designed by the art director Arrigo Equini.

== Cast ==
- Claudio Gora as Claudio, l'avvocato
- Valentina Cortese as Valentina, la sua segretaria
- Paola Barbara as L'impiegata del banco lotto
- Bella Starace Sainati as Sua madre
- Gino Cervi as Il pregiudicato ex detenuto
- Gino Cavalieri as Suo compagno
- Sergio Tofano as Il professore naturalista
- Lina Bacci as Sua sorella
- Ruggero Ruggeri as L'impiegato di baco ladro
- Oretta Fiume as Sua figlia
- Armando Falconi as Il nobile decaduto
- Annibale Betrone as Il suo maggiordomo
- Memo Benassi as Il pazzo
- Elena Altieri as Sua moglie
- Camillo Pilotto as Il vinaio
- Pina Renzi as Sua moglie
- Vera Worth as La dattilografia
- Giuseppe Zago as Il capo ufficio pignolo

== Bibliography ==
- Chiti, Roberto & Poppi, Roberto. I film: Tutti i film italiani dal 1930 al 1944. Gremese Editore, 2005.
- Curti, Roberto. Italian Giallo in Film and Television: A Critical History. McFarland, 2022.
