= Enzo Di Gianni =

- Born: 26 June 1908; Naples, Italy
- Died: 3 March 1975 (aged 66); Rome, Italy
- Occupations: Director, Producer, Writer
- Years active: 1949-1965

Enzo Di Gianni (26 June 1908 – 3 March 1975) was an Italian screenwriter, producer and film director.

== Selected filmography ==
- Destiny (1951)
- Repentance (1952)
- Milanese in Naples (1954)

== Bibliography ==
- Emiliano Morreale. Così piangevano: il cinema melò nell'Italia degli anni Cinquanta. Donzelli Editore, 2011.
