= Buckaroo: The Winchester Does Not Forgive =

1968 film by Adelchi Bianchi

- Directed by: Adelchi Bianchi
- Written by: Romano Scucciuglia
- Starring: Dean Reed
- Cinematography: Oberdan Troiani
- Music by: Lallo Gori
- Distributed by: Variety Distribution
- Release date: 1967
- Country: Italy
- Language: Italian

Buckaroo: The Winchester Does Not Forgive (Italian: Buckaroo (Il winchester che non perdona)), also known as A Winchester Does Not Forgive, is a 1967 Italian Spaghetti Western film directed by Adelchi Bianchi and starring Dean Reed.

== Plot ==
Lasch and a friend head to claim a gold mine near a small town by the Mexican border. Their stagecoach is attacked by Monteiro's outlaw gang. In a deal with Monteiro, Lasch betrays and kills his friend to save himself. Meanwhile, Johnny, an elderly farmer with another gold mine nearby, becomes Lasch's target. To take everything, Lasch makes Johnny's life miserable, threatening him and sabotaging his business. Lasch becomes the richest and most powerful figure in the area. Buckaroo, a horse tamer, arrives in town and agrees to work for Johnny, seemingly because of Johnny's beautiful daughter. When Johnny is killed in an ambush, Buckaroo gathers men to fight against the armies of Lasch and Monteiro. It may be more personal than just for the love of Annie.

== Cast ==
- Dean Reed as Buckaroo
- Monica Brugger as Annie
- Livio Lorenzon as Lash
- Ugo Sasso as Johnny
