= I 4 tassisti =

- Directed by: Giorgio Bianchi
- Written by: Castellano e Pipolo; Giorgio Bianchi; Mario Amendola; Leo Benvenuti; Piero De Bernardi
- Cinematography: Silvano Ippoliti
- Music by: Fiorenzo Carpi
- Release date: 1963
- Running time: 73 minute
- Language: Italian

I 4 tassisti (The four taxi drivers) is a 1963 Italian comedy film directed by Giorgio Bianchi.

== Plot ==
=== The groom ===
In Milan, Baldassarre Boldrini, a shy and frustrated young man, is on the verge of marrying his cousin. On the way to the church for the ceremony, he's persuaded by the charming taxi driver, Filomena, to change his mind and run away with her.

=== A good deed ===
Pasquale Scognamillo, a taxi driver obsessed with female beauty, picks up a distressed nun, Sister Serena, on his way back from Pompeii. She tricks him into giving her money, revealing later in Naples that she is a professional scam artist.

=== Treasure hunt ===
Pomilio Barone, a naive and dreamy taxi driver, chauffeurs around Corinna, a wealthy and attractive drunk girl, in Turin. She involves him in a nocturnal treasure hunt. During the competition, he falls for her and mistakenly thinks the feeling is mutual. However, he's rudely dumped at the end of the evening, realizing he was only deceived.

=== The man in blue ===
In Rome, Mr. Gigi welcomes a strange customer with a bad toothache into his taxi. The next day, he discovers that this person is a dangerous murderer, putting his life in danger for having seen his face. Indeed, at the garage exit, he is kidnapped by the murderer, who now wants to eliminate the dangerous witness. Behind the wheel of his taxi, Mr. Gigi does everything to attract the attention of law enforcement, but in vain. Only the intervention of a gas station attendant, who picks up his distress message, saves the taxi driver's life just in time.

== Cast ==
- Aldo Fabrizi: Sor Gigi
- Peppino De Filippo: Pasquale Scognamiglio (taxi driver)
- Erminio Macario: Pomilio Barone
- Gino Bramieri: Baldassare Boldrini
- Didi Perego: Filomena
- Gianrico Tedeschi: killer dressed in blue
- Yvonne Furneaux: La donna ubriaca
- Carlo Delle Piane: man in filling station
- Graziella Granata: fake nun
- Margaret Lee : blonde girl in the taxi
- Bruno Scipioni : men in garage
