= Lilia Landi =

Italian actress (1929–2019)

- Born: 24 August 1929; Rome, Lazio, Italy
- Died: 9 July 2019 (aged 89); Viareggio, Italy
- Other name: Lilia Giovannetti
- Occupation: Actress
- Years active: 1947–1959 (film )

Lilia Landi (24 August 1929 – 9 July 2019) was an Italian film actress. She died in Viareggio on 9 July 2019, at the age of 89.

== Selected filmography ==
- My Beautiful Daughter (1950)
- Turri il bandito (1950)
- Era lui... sì! sì! (1951)
- Licenza premio (1951)
- Destiny (1951)
- The White Sheik (1952)
- Abracadabra (1952)
- Frine, Courtesan of Orient (1953)
- Milanese in Naples (1954)
- Il Grido (1957)

== Bibliography ==
- Frank Burke. Fellini's Films: From Postwar to Postmodern. Twayne Publishers, 1996.
