= Milanese in Naples =

- Directed by: Enzo Di Gianni
- Written by: Enzo Di Gianni
- Produced by: Esposito Vincenzo
- Starring: Eva Nova; Ugo Tognazzi; Carlo Campanini
- Cinematography: Giuseppe La Torre
- Edited by: Nina Del Sordo
- Music by: Tarcisio Fusco
- Production company: Eva Film
- Distributed by: Variety Distribution
- Release date: 1954
- Running time: 90 minutes
- Country: Italy
- Language: Italian

Milanese in Naples (Italian: Milanesi a Napoli) is a 1954 Italian comedy film directed by Enzo Di Gianni and starring Eva Nova, Ugo Tognazzi and Carlo Campanini. The film's sets were designed by the art director Oscar D'Amico.

== Synopsis ==
A northern industrialist arrives in Naples with the idea of building a factory to mass-produce the pizza specialties of the region, causing uproar from the locals. Eventually the two sides are reconciled through a double marriage.

== Cast ==
- Eva Nova as Immacolata Santolillo
- Ugo Tognazzi as Franco Baraldi
- Carlo Campanini as Commendator Brambilla
- Enrico Viarisio as Professor Clemente Simoni
- Dolores Palumbo as Dottoressa Dora Vincenzi
- Nino Taranto as Luigi Martiello
- Carlo Sposito as Assistante del Prof. Simoni
- Enzo Turco as 'Bersagliere', pizzaiolo fratello di Immacolata
- Lilia Landi as Milly
- Roberto Bruni as Ing, Velenzani
- Loris Gizzi as Presidente della società
- Amedeo Girardi as Attore che impersona 'O Zappatore'
- Serena Michelotti as Figlia di Dora
- Alfredo Rizzo as Alfredo
- Ugo D'Alessio as Cantante col mandolino
- Rino Salviati as Cantante con la chitarra
- Anna Pretolani
- Piero Giagnoni as Bambino Peppiniello
- Giovanni Luchetti as Sergio
- Enza Soldi
- Massimo Seccia as Pasqualino
- Lidialberta Moneta
- Vera Scialanca

== Bibliography ==
- Chiti, Roberto & Poppi, Roberto. Dizionario del cinema italiano: Dal 1945 al 1959. Gremese Editore, 1991.
- Marlow-Mann, Alex. The New Neapolitan Cinema. Edinburgh University Press, 2011.
