= Frontier Wolf =

1952 film

- Spanish theatrical poster
- Directed by: Edoardo Anton
- Written by: Edoardo Anton
- Starring: Piero Lulli; Maria Frau Tamara Lees
- Cinematography: Carlo Carlini; Romolo Garroni
- Edited by: Otello Colangeli
- Music by: Alberto De Castello
- Production company: Società Anonima Films Attualità
- Distributed by: Variety Distribution
- Release date: 8 March 1952
- Running time: 87 minutes
- Country: Italy
- Language: Italian

Frontier Wolf (Italian: Il lupo della frontiera) is a 1952 Italian adventure film written and directed by Edoardo Anton and starring Piero Lulli, Maria Frau and Tamara Lees.

It was shot at the Palatino Studios in Rome. The film's sets were designed by the art director Piero Filippone.

== Synopsis ==
Following a series of attacks on a railway near the border, the police send in an undercover agent to discover who is behind the campaign.

== Distribution ==
It was first released on television on March 25, 2021 on Rete 4 at 2:50 am.

== Cast ==
- Piero Lulli as Guido
- Maria Frau as Gilda
- Tamara Lees as Barbara
- Tonio Selwart as Peter
- Fausto Guerzoni as Falconiere
- Amedeo Trilli as Don Luigi
- Adalberto Roni as Enrico
- Edoardo Anton as Lorenzo
- Armando Annuale as Sacerdote
