= The Sheriff (1959 film) =

1959 film directed by Roberto Bianchi Montero

La sceriffa
- Directed by: Roberto Bianchi Montero
- Written by: Mario Amendola
- Produced by: Guido Paolucci
- Starring: Tina Pica; Tina De Mola; Ugo Tognazzi
- Cinematography: Sergio Pesce
- Edited by: Ettore Salvi
- Production company: Betauno Film
- Release date: 16 August 1959
- Running time: 91 minutes
- Country: Italy
- Language: Italian

La sceriffa (The Sheriff) is a 1959 Italian Western comedy in black-and-white, directed by Roberto Bianchi Montero. It stars Italian comedy star Ugo Tognazzi. It was released on 16 August 1959. The film starred several comedians and spawned a number of western comedies which followed.

== Plot ==
A sheriff is killed and his widow (Tina Pica) takes up his job to find the killers.

== Cast ==
- Tina Pica as Carmela Esposito, 'la Sceriffa'
- Ugo Tognazzi as Colorado Joe
- Livio Lorenzon as Jimmy Jesse
- Tino Scotti as The Judge
- Alberto Sorrentino as Brutto Tempo - the Native American
- Anita Todesco as Nuvola Rosa - Brutto Tempo's Daughter
- Carlo Pisacane as Nick
- Carlo Sposito as Gennarino - aka Gen
- Annie Alberti as Connie Dallas
- Franco Balducci as Jimmy Jesse's Brother
- Stelio Candelli as Bruno Carotenuto
- Elio Crovetto as Jack - the Texan drunk
- Tina De Mola as Dolly - the singer
- Fanfulla as Ciccio - Sceriffa's assistant

== Criticism ==
This is an “inconsequential western that tries in vain to poke fun at relevant American genre films; neither entertaining nor funny.” According to the dictionary of international film. The Italian colleagues complain that the film was shot "with little resources and too hasty", although it could have been "more pleasant with more care and attention". Christian Kessler notes that the director's 23rd film is exemplary of "the comedies of the time that attempted to revitalize the already worn-out ways of the local comedy class by adding genre-parodic elements". The film is "reasonably entertaining" despite the non-transferability of the dialect jokes prevalent in the original.
