= Pazzo d'amore =

- Directed by: Giacomo Gentilomo
- Written by: Vittorio Metz
- Starring: Renato Rascel
- Cinematography: Giorgio Orsini; Giovanni Vitrotti
- Music by: Giovanni Militello
- Release date: 1942
- Language: Italian

Pazzo d'amore (meaning "Madly in love") is a 1942 Italian comedy film directed by Giacomo Gentilomo and starring Renato Rascel.

== Plot ==
Two unemployed vagrants, one of small stature and the other of greater height, one day find a bottle by the sea. Inside a map, with the indication of a treasure hidden in an island. After alternating situations, they arrive on the island, but, despite themselves, they discover that the story of the treasure is an advertising invention. The little tramp overcomes the disappointment for the lack of enrichment with the love for his girlfriend.

== Cast ==
- Renato Rascel as Renato
- Elena Grey as Milli
- Pietro Tordi as Giovannone
- Tino Scotti as Fegato
- Tina De Mola as Elena
- Augusto Di Giovanni as Fred
- Enzo Biliotti as Il Guercio
- Mario Siletti as Bombita
- Lamberto Picasso as March
- Claudio Ermelli as Signor Pignolo
- Carlo Duse
