= It's Forever Springtime =

- Directed by: Renato Castellani
- Written by: Suso Cecchi d'Amico; Renato Castellani
- Music by: Nino Rota
- Release date: 1950
- Country: Italy
- Language: Italian

It's Forever Springtime (Italian: È primavera...) is a 1950 Italian drama film directed by Renato Castellani.

== Plot ==
Beppe Agosti, Florentine, baker's boy and orphan, is very popular with girls, especially the servants, for his easy way of doing things and for his cheerfulness. Called up to arms, he is sent to Catania and becomes friends with Cavalluccio, a Sicilian fellow soldier and acts as a companion for his engagement with Maria Antonia, a waitress in the house of a well-known lawyer. Cavalluccio, for a serious lack of discipline, is put in prison and transferred. Maria Antonia is sad and Beppe knows how to console her so the two fall in love and then get married. Beppe is also transferred to Milan, where he feels alone and ends up marrying himself with the new conqueror Lucia, not revealing that he is already married. But Maria Antonia learns that her husband's class has been dismissed, and she becomes suspicious of her, so she runs to Milan where she, having discovered everything about her, she tries to kill him, but her knife falls from her hand. All this is followed by legal proceedings, with the logical solution that the second marriage is not valid. Beppe and Maria Antonia, happy, return to Catania.

== Cast ==
- Mario Angelotti as Beppe Agosti
- Elena Varzi as Maria Antonia
- Don Donati as Cavalluccio
- Ettore Jannetti as Avvocato Di Salvo
- Grazia Idonea as Signora Di Salvo
- Irene Genna as Lucia
- Gianni Santi
- Tanino Chiurazzi as Il ragazzo
- Cesare Ranucci as Il presidente
- Ernesto Gaione as Avvocato Rossi
- Giordano Gaggioli as Il fornaio
- Ugo Gigliarelli as Il cappellano
- Amedeo Orsini
- Giovanna Roscioli
- Renato Baldini
