= Hélène Rémy =

French actress

Hélène Remy
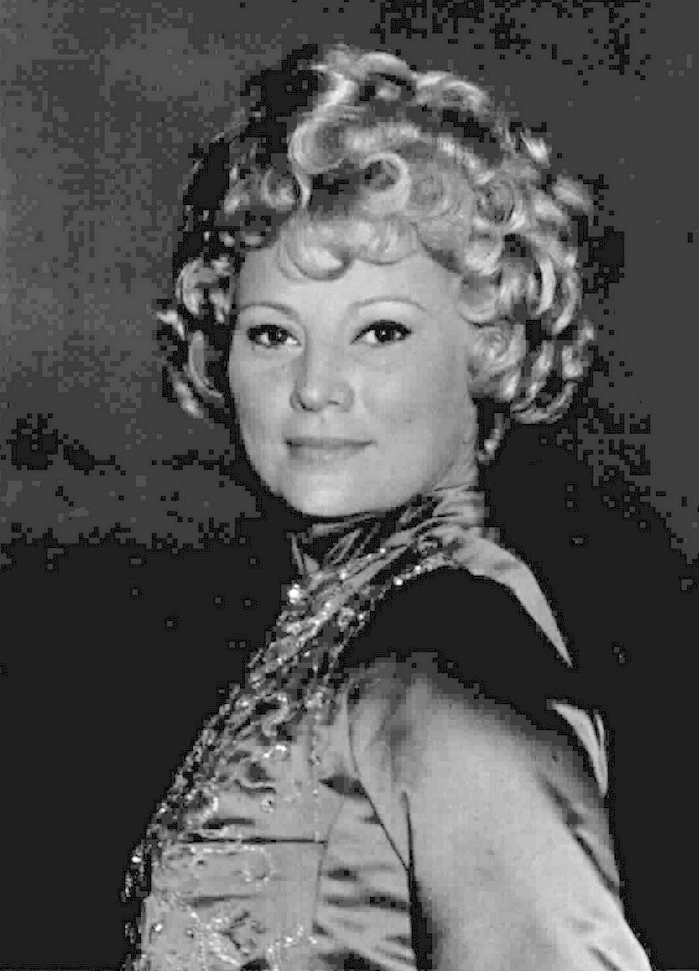
- Born: 16 August 1932 (age 93); Paris, France
- Occupation: Actress
- Years active: 1949 - 1970 (film)

Hélène Rémy (born 1932) is a retired French film actress. She spent much of her career working in the Italian film industry.

== Selected filmography ==
- Cage of Girls (1949)
- The Sinners (1949)
- Sending of Flowers (1950)
- Clara de Montargis (1951)
- Paris Is Always Paris (1951)
- Five Paupers in an Automobile (1952)
- Giovinezza (1952)
- We Two Alone (1952)
- Torment of the Past (1952)
- A Thief in Paradise (1952)
- The Pagans (1953)
- Disowned (1954)
- Husbands in the City (1957)
- The Vampire and the Ballerina (1960)
- Behind Closed Doors (1961)
- The Last of the Vikings (1961)
- Borsalino (1970)

== Bibliography ==
- Curti, Roberto. Italian Gothic Horror Films, 1957-1969. McFarland, 2015.
