= The Black Panther (1942 film) =

1942 film directed by Domenico Gambino

- Directed by: Domenico Gambino
- Written by: Oreste Gasperini
- Based on: The Black Panther by Luis Velter
- Produced by: Giovanni Seyta
- Starring: Leda Gloria; Dria Paola; Lauro Gazzolo
- Cinematography: Edoardo Lamberti
- Edited by: Giancarlo Cappelli
- Music by: Paolo Di Fabio
- Production company: Stella Film
- Distributed by: Rex Film
- Release date: 22 March 1942
- Running time: 77 minutes
- Country: Italy
- Language: Italian

The Black Panther (Italian: La pantera nera) is a 1942 Italian crime film directed by Domenico Gambino and starring Leda Gloria, Dria Paola and Lauro Gazzolo. It was shot at the Titanus Studios in Rome. The film's sets were designed by the art directors Arrigo Equini and Vincenzo Pantano.

== Synopsis ==
Two police officers are killed while investigating criminal activities at The Black Panther nightclub. A third detective goes undercover to bring the murderers to justice.

== Cast ==
- Leda Gloria as Sonya Harkaneck
- Dria Paola as Anna, la segretaria dell'ispettore Hegeduz
- Lauro Gazzolo as L'ispettore Stefano Hegeduz
- Ennio Cerlesi as Andrea Szabo
- Vanna Martines as Margherita Ambrus
- Nando Tamberlani as Il professore Ambrus
- Nerio Bernardi as Il dottore Rosenberg
- Marichetta Stoppa as Josette
- Pia De Doses as Una entraineuse del locale
- Silvio Bagolini as Tony
- Nico Pepe as Panik
- Amina Pirani Maggi as La signora Simmons
- Gildo Bocci as Il sergente Mack
- Loris Gizzi as L'ispettore Jackmil
- Vitale De Stefano as Jean
- Nino Marchetti as Gerard
- Alfredo Martinelli as Il signor Roney

== Bibliography ==
- Curti, Roberto. Italian Giallo in Film and Television: A Critical History. McFarland, 2022.
- Goble, Alan. The Complete Index to Literary Sources in Film. Walter de Gruyter, 1999.
