= Edoardo Anton =

Italian screenwriter and film director (1910–1986)

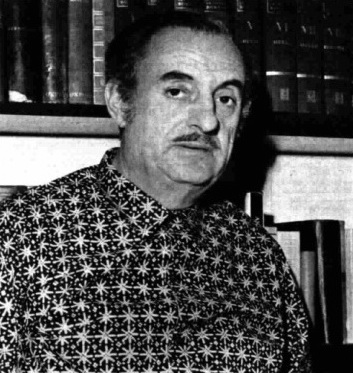
- Born: Edoardo Antonelli; 7 January 1910; Rome, Italy
- Died: 11 May 1986 (aged 76); Rome, Italy
- Occupations: Director, screenwriter

Edoardo Anton (7 January 1910 – 11 May 1986) was an Italian screenwriter and film director.

== Background ==
Born in Rome as Edoardo Antonelli, Anton was the son of the playwright and journalist Luigi Antonelli. He entered the cinema industry in mid-thirties and soon became a prolific screenwriter specialized in comedy films. His work as filmmaker is marginal, mainly confined to the co-direction of a few international co-productions; the only work entirely attributable to him is Il lupo della frontiera.

== Selected filmography ==
=== Writer ===
Film
| Year | Title | Notes |
|---|---|---|
| 1939 | The Hotel of the Absent | |
| 1941 | The Adventuress from the Floor Above | |
| 1941 | Princess Cinderella | |
| 1942 | Fourth Page | |
| 1942 | Bengasi | |
| 1942 | Headlights in the Fog | |
| 1943 | Farewell Love! | |
| 1951 | The Counterfeiters | |
| 1952 | I, Hamlet | |
| 1953 | Saluti e baci | |
| 1953 | The Enchanting Enemy | |
| 1954 | Cardinal Lambertini | |
| 1955 | Il coraggio | |
| 1955 | The Sign of Venus | |
| 1956 | Toto, Peppino, and the Hussy | |
| 1956 | Totò, Peppino e i fuorilegge | |
| 1957 | Husbands in the City | |
| 1958 | Girls for the Summer | |
| 1958 | Mogli pericolose | |
| 1959 | The Beautiful Legs of Sabrina | |
| 1959 | Le sorprese dell'amore | |
| 1959 | Uncle Was a Vampire | |
| 1960 | Gentlemen Are Born | |
| 1960 | Robin Hood and the Pirates | |
| 1961 | Romulus and the Sabines | |
| 1964 | Full Hearts and Empty Pockets | |

=== Director ===
Film
| Year | Title | Notes |
|---|---|---|
| 1949 | The Glass Mountain | |
| 1952 | Frontier Wolf | |
| 1954 | Laugh! Laugh! Laugh! | |
