= Raffaele Masciocchi =

Italian cinematographer

- Occupation: Cinematographer
- Years active: 1947–1967

Raffaele Masciocchi was an Italian cinematographer.

== Selected filmography ==
- Destiny (1951)
- Daughters of Destiny (1954)
- Lazzarella (1957)
- The Sword and the Cross (1958)
- Tuppe tuppe, Marescià! (1958)
- Hannibal (1959)
- Queen of the Pirates (1960)
- The Giants of Thessaly (1960)
- Robin Hood and the Pirates (1960)
- Sword of the Conqueror (1961)
- Battle of the Worlds (1961)
- The Seventh Sword (1962)
- Charge of the Black Lancers (1962)
- The Magnificent Adventurer (1963)
- The Ghost (1963)
- Gold for the Caesars (1963)
- Hercules Against the Barbarians (1964)
- La vendetta dei gladiatori (1964)
- James Tont operazione U.N.O. (1965)

== Bibliography ==
- Thomas Weisser. Spaghetti Westerns--the Good, the Bad and the Violent: A Comprehensive, Illustrated Filmography of 558 Eurowesterns and Their Personnel, 1961–1977. McFarland, 2005.
