= A Dog's Life (1950 film) =

1950 film

- Film poster
- Directed by: Mario Monicelli; Steno
- Written by: Sergio Amidei; Aldo Fabrizi; Ruggero Maccari; Mario Monicelli
- Produced by: Clemente Fracassi; Carlo Ponti
- Starring: Aldo Fabrizi; Gina Lollobrigida
- Cinematography: Mario Bava
- Edited by: Mario Bonotti
- Music by: Nino Rota
- Release date: 28 September 1950
- Running time: 108 minutes
- Country: Italy
- Language: Italian

A Dog's Life (Italian: Vita da cani) is a 1950 Italian comedy film directed by Mario Monicelli and Steno.

== Plot ==
Nino Martoni is the manager of a ramshackle show company. Her dancers include Lucy, the soubrette, capricious and obstinate, Franca, who left her beloved boyfriend Carlo with bitterness and suffering, because he was too poor for her ambitions, who aspires to a comfortable and luxurious life and Vera, in love reciprocated by Mario, the son of a rich and wealthy bourgeois.

The troupe is joined by Margherita, who has fled from the village and is wanted by the police on behalf of her parents, who is welcomed by the manager moved by the frightened and melancholy girl.

When Lucy, after yet another altercation with Nino, leaves the company, this replaces her with Margherita who reveals unsuspected skills as a dancer and singer. The success of the girl, renamed Rita Buton, in the Alambra in Rome is overwhelming and the highly satisfied impresario of the theater signs a contract with the company for 2 months.

Unfortunately, success and fame will not be for everyone:

Franca reluctantly accepts the attentions of a very rich, but slippery and repulsive entrepreneur, attracted by the comfortable life that he can offer her and which she yearns for. She will then end up committing suicide shortly after the wedding by throwing herself out of a window, when her repellent husband introduces her to his newly hired technical director, who is none other than Carlo, who in the meantime has managed to make his talent appreciated and to patent one of his inventions.

Mario's father joins his son who has run away from home to run after his beloved, still a minor. In the police station, where the girl is summoned together with Nino, accused of circumvention of minors, however the unexpected happens when Vera recognizes in the man, the guy who had given her a lift with the car and who had tried, in vain, to abuse her. At that point Mario's father, bitterly opposed to his son's relationship with a dancer, realizes that Vera is a good and serious girl and accepts her by apologizing and withdrawing her complaint. Vera, radiant and happy, prefers marriage to her career.

Meanwhile Nino, in love with Rita, is ready to make his declaration of love with a ring as a gift, but unseen attends an important offer of engagement of the girl by a well-known and prestigious theatrical impresario of Milan, who witnessed the show was impressed by the young woman's talent.

Nino, reluctantly, sacrificing her feeling for Rita and not wanting to compromise the young woman's career, takes her in a bad way, even driving her out of her company. The girl, bewildered, unable to understand the man's behavior, runs away from the theater crying and goes to sign the contract with the Milan impresario.

By now Margherita, alias Rita Buton, has become a soubrette; Nino secretly goes to the theater where she is performing a show and leaves an anonymous bouquet of flowers at the entrance to be given to the girl.

Nino is left with the rest of the company, in which he resumes Lucy, meanwhile without a job, continuing to direct the shows despite the difficulties.

== Cast ==
- Aldo Fabrizi as Nino Martoni
- Gina Lollobrigida as Margherita 'Rita Buton'
- Delia Scala as Vera
- Tamara Lees as Franka
- Gianni Barrella as L'impresario
- Bruno Corelli as Dedè Moreno, il primo ballerino
- Enzo Furlai as Boselli (as Enzo Furlai-Furlanetto)
- Enzo Maggio as Gigetto
- Michele Malaspina as Il commendatore Cantelli
- Pasquale Misiano
- Eduardo Passarelli
- Nyta Dover as Lucy d'Astrid
- Marcello Mastroianni as Carlo Danesi, fidanzato di Franca (credited as Marcello Mastrojanni)
