= Buonanotte Bettina =

Buonnotte Bettina
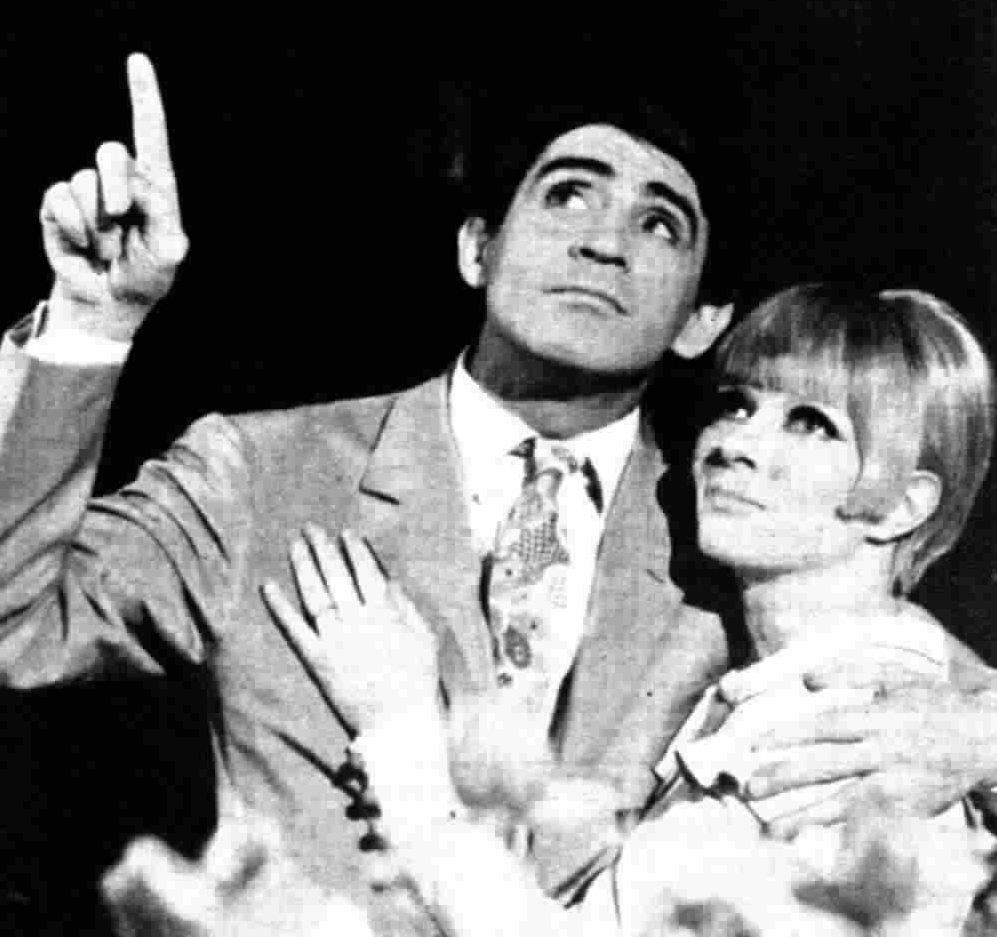
- Walter Chiari and Delia Scala acting Buonanotte Bettina
- Written by: Garinei & Giovannini
- Original language: Italian
- Genre: Comedy
- Setting: Turin

Premiere
- Date premiered: 14 November 1956

Buonanotte Bettina (lit. 'Good night Bettina') is a play by Italian playwrights Pietro Garinei and Sandro Giovannini. It is set in Turin on 14 November 1956. An English version, titled When in Rome, was given at Adelphi Theater in London in 1959. There's also a Spanish version, set in Teatro de la Comedia of Madrid on 31 December 1958.

== Synopsis ==
Andrea's father and Nicoletta's mother, as well as characters, are narrators of the whole story, hiding or revealing a latent attraction between them.

The manuscript of a novel entitled "Buonanotte Bettina" is accidentally found, abandoned in a taxi, by the Roman editor Colibò. It isn't known whether it is a novel or a masterpiece, whether it is fictional. But the content is, in every matter, hot. With tones ranging from risqué to romance, it tells of the sensual secret meetings between Bettina and the rude truck driver Joe. The editor considers the work a real editorial discovery and is looking for the author. Nicoletta, a young wife sweet and discreet, discovers that her story is becoming an editorial success, and wants to contact Colibò to be recognized as the author.

Andrea, Nicoletta's husband, a bank clerk, does not find himself in Joe so male, and he is shocked by his wife's public image as the author of lustful adventures. He would like her to use a pseudonym, to remain unknown, while suspecting some "autobiography" in the novel, consuming himself in suspicion and jealousy.

Misunderstandings and unforeseen events of all kinds follow, which come together in a rather reassuring ending.

== Television adaptation ==
The 1967 the film adaptation was directed by Eros Macchi.

== Bibliography ==
- Rita Cirio – Pietro Favari, Sentimental. ll teatro di rivista italiano, Bompiani, 1974
- Mariagabriella Cambiaghi (a cura di), Il teatro di Garinei e Giovannini, Bulzoni Editore, 1999
- Felice Liperi, I padri di Rugantino, Rai Libri, 2001
- Lello Garinei – Marco Giovannini, Quarant'anni di teatro musicale all'italiana, Rizzoli, 1985
- Pietro Garinei, Tutto G&G – Il meglio della commedia musicale, Gremese, 1996
- Morando Morandini, Sessappiglio. Gli anni d'oro del teatro di rivista, Il Formichiere, 1978
