= Nyta Dover =

Swiss actress

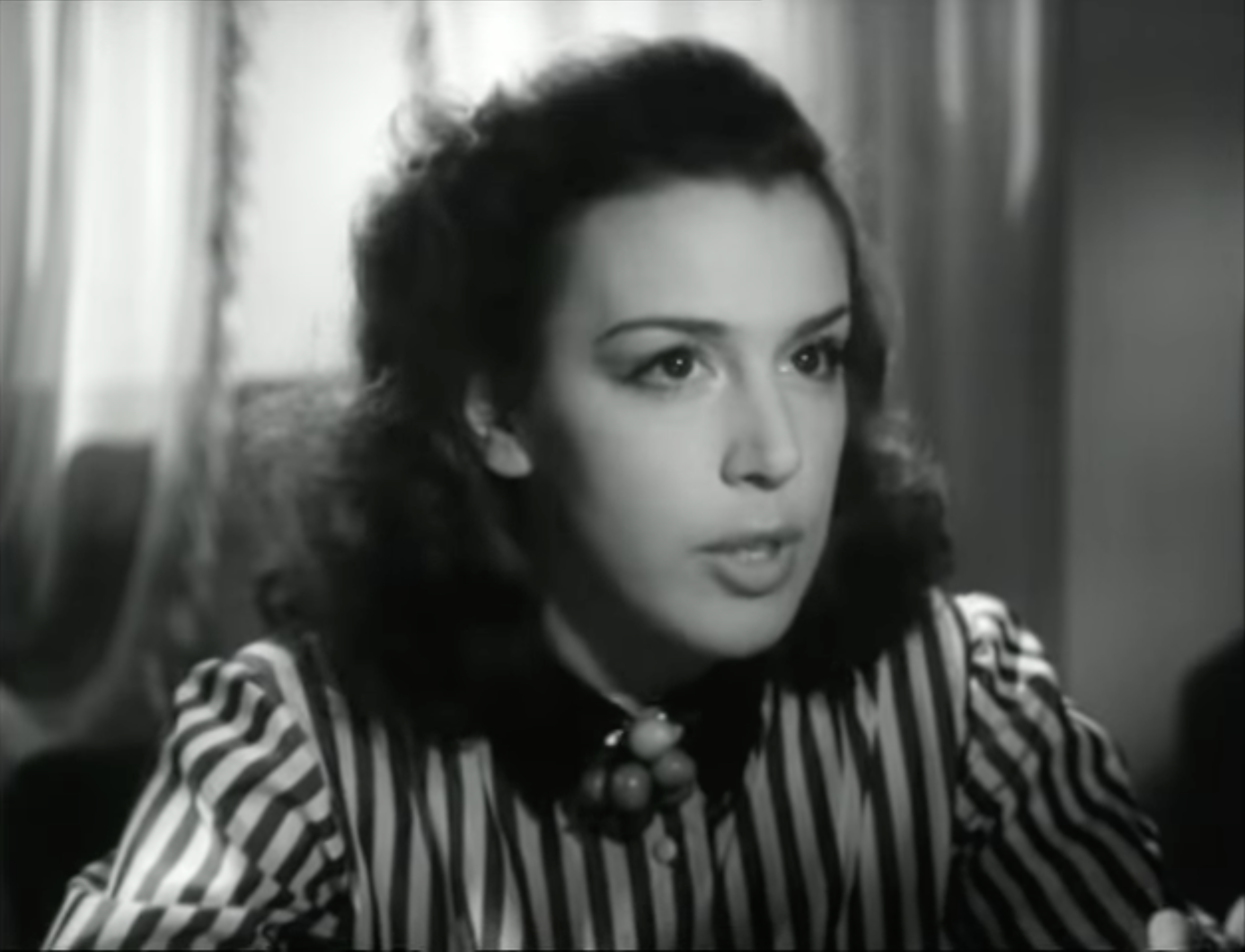
- Dover in The Passaguai Family (1951)
- Born: 17 May 1927; Vevey, Switzerland
- Died: 13 April 1998 (aged 70); Fort Lauderdale, Florida, United States
- Occupation: Actress
- Years active: 1948-1959

Nyta Dover (17 May 1927 – 13 April 1998) was a Swiss actress. She appeared in more than 30 films from 1948 to 1959.

== Selected filmography ==
Year	Title	Role	Notes
1954	Addio, figlio mio!		
1953	Eager to Live	Simona	
1952	The Queen of Sheba	Kinnor	
1952	Viva il cinema!		
1951	Amor non ho... però... però		
1951	Era lui... sì! sì!		
1951	Arrivano i nostri		
1951	The Passaguai Family		
1951	Ha fatto tredici		
1951	Porca miseria		
1950	A Dog's Life		
1950	The Knight Has Arrived!		
1950	Romanticismo		
1949	The Monastery of Santa Chiara		
