= The Giants of Thessaly =

- Directed by: Riccardo Freda
- Screenplay by: Giuseppe Masini; Mario Rossetti; Riccardo Freda; Ennio De Concini
- Produced by: Virgilio De Blasi
- Starring: Roland Carey; Ziva Rodann; Alberto Farnese; Massimo Girotti
- Cinematography: Václav Vích; Raffaele Masciocchi
- Edited by: Otello Colangeli
- Music by: Carlo Rustichelli
- Production companies: Alexandra Produzioni Cinematografiche; Lyres Societé Cinématographique
- Distributed by: Filmar
- Release date: 6 December 1960 (Italy)
- Running time: 87 minutes
- Countries: Italy; France
- Box office: ₤408 million

The Giants of Thessaly (Italian: I giganti della Tessaglia (Gli Argonauti), French: Le Géant de Thessalie, released in the UK as Jason and the Golden Fleece) is a 1960 Italian-French adventure-fantasy film directed by Riccardo Freda. It is loosely based on the epic poem Argonautica by Apollonius Rhodius.

== Plot ==
Thessaly, overrun with barbarian invaders and beset with natural disasters, sends King Jason and his Argonauts on a search for the fabled Golden Fleece. Meanwhile, back home, his scheming cohort is plotting to get his hands on the kingdom and the queen.

The film's subplots bear some resemblance to Odysseus' odyssey including a plot by a trusted lord to seize a throne from an absent king and a desire to marry the king's faithful wife. Jason and his men encounter a queen on her island of siren witches who turns seduced men into animals much like Odysseus' encounter with the sorceress Circe. There is also a struggle against a Cyclops also reminiscent of the encounter between Odysseus and Polyphemus the Cyclops son of Poseidon.

== Cast ==
- Roland Carey as Jason
- Ziva Rodann as Creusa
- Massimo Girotti as Orfeo
- Alberto Farnese as Adrasto
- Nadine Sanders as Queen Gaia
- Luciano Marin as Euristeo
- Cathia Caro as Aglaia
- Alfredo Varelli as Argo
- Maria Teresa Vianello as Gaia's Sister
- Nando Tamberlani as Aglaia's Father
- Alberto Sorrentino as Licaone
- Paolo Gozlino as Laerte
- Raf Baldassarre as Antinoo

== Release ==
The Giants of Thessaly was released in Italy on 6 December 1960 where it was distributed by Filmar. It grossed a total of 408 million Italian lire domestically.

== Reception ==
In a contemporary review, the Monthly Film Bulletin noted that the script "owes very little to the legend, instead stringing together a series of action highlights, settings and characters which, if anything, have even less consistency than the strip-cartoon formula to which they owe their inspiration." The review noted that the "scaling of the colossal statue is moderately spectacular, too. The rest, including the filtered colour, is sub-Bava, let down by indifferent acting, irrelevance (what on earth is Orpheus doing in the film?) unimpressive trick-work (the island monster) and abysmal dubbing."
