= Bruno Corelli =

Italian actor (1918–1983)

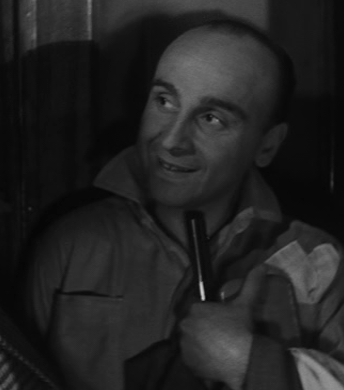
- Bruno Corelli in A Dog's Life (1950)
- Born: 20 August 1918; Bologna
- Died: 17 February 1983 (aged 64); Tunis

Bruno Corelli (20 August 1918 – 17 February 1983) was an Italian actor.

== Life and career ==
Born in Bologna, after being part of a dramatic society of his hometown Corelli moved to Rome to attend the Centro Sperimentale di Cinematografia. He made his film debut in 1938, when together with several of his classmates he took part to the film Giuseppe Verdi. Corelli then abandoned the courses to take part in several stage plays and riviste, and also to perform as a mime-dancer.

In the aftermath of the Second World War, Corelli started an intense film activity, mostly appearing in supporting roles in comedy films.

== Selected filmography ==
- Eleonora Duse (1947)
- Baron Carlo Mazza (1948)
- The Transporter (1950)
- Ring Around the Clock (1950)
- A Dog's Life (1950)
- I'm the Capataz (1951)
- In Olden Days (1952)
- Repentance (1952)
- Toto in Color (1952)
- Viva il cinema! (1952)
- Abracadabra (1952)
- They Stole a Tram (1954)
- The Pirate and the Slave Girl (1959)
- The Two Marshals (1961)
