= Tizio, Caio, Sempronio =

- Release date: 1951
- Country: Italy
- Language: Italian

Tizio, Caio, Sempronio (The Italian equivalent of "Tom, Dick, and Harry") is a 1951 Italian film.
