= Gisa Radicchi Levi =

Italian film editor

- Born: 1905; Turin, Kingdom of Italy
- Died: 1985 (aged 79–80); Rome, Italy
- Occupation: Film editor

Gisa Radicchi Levi (1905–1985) was an Italian film editor of Jewish origins active in the Italian film industry between the 1930s and the 1960s.

== Selected filmography ==
- Die Slowly, You'll Enjoy It More (1967)
- An Angel for Satan (1966)
- Te lo leggo negli occhi (1965)
- The Thursday (1964)
- Gli imbroglioni (1963)
- Eighteen in the Sun (1962)
- Crazy Desire (1962)
- Totòtruffa '62 (1961)
- Sua Eccellenza si fermò a mangiare (1961)
- Totò, Fabrizi e i giovani d'oggi (1960)
- Signori si nasce (1960)
- Guardatele ma non toccatele (1959)
- Nel blu dipinto di blu (1959)
- Tipi da spiaggia (1959)
- Maid, Thief and Guard (1958)
- Toto, Peppino and the Fanatics (1958)
- L'uomo dai calzoni corti (1958)
- Peppino, le modelle e chella là (1957)
- Totò, Peppino e i fuorilegge (1956)
- Toto, Peppino, and the Hussy (1956)
- The Band of Honest Men (1956)
- Il coraggio (1955)
- Destination Piovarolo (1955)
- The Miller's Beautiful Wife (1955)
- Are We Men or Corporals? (1955)
- Totò all'inferno (1955)
- Town of Bells (1954)
- L'uomo la bestia e la virtù (1953)
- Hell Raiders of the Deep (1953)
- Husband and Wife (1952)
- Toto and the Women (1952)
- Filumena Marturano (1951)
- Cronaca nera (1947)
- Un giorno nella vita (1946)
- The Testimony (1946)
- Le miserie del signor Travet (1945)
- In High Places (1945)
- The Champion (1943)
- Malombra (1942)
- Piccolo mondo antico (1941)
- Frenzy (1939)
- The Faceless Voice (1939)
