= Roberto Cinquini =

Italian film editor (1924–1965)

- Born: 14 July 1924; Rome, Kingdom of Italy
- Died: 18 July 1965 (aged 41); Rome, Italy
- Occupation: Film editor
- Parents: Alberto Cinquini (father); Gina Moneta (mother)

Roberto Cinquini (14 July 1924 – 18 July 1965) was an Italian film editor.

He edited A Fistful of Dollars (1964), directed by Sergio Leone,

He edited comedy black and white films like Arrangiatevi! (1959), directed by Mauro Bolognini, I due marescialli (1961), directed by Sergio Corbucci, and Sedotta e abbandonata (1964), directed by Pietro Germi.

He also edited Un Turco napoletano (1953), and Il medico dei pazzi (1954), both directed by Mario Mattoli.

== Filmography ==
=== As editor ===
- Our Husbands (1966)
- Les combinards (1966)
- Siete hombres de oro (1965)
- Los complejos (1965)
- Spy in Your Eye (1965)
- Place Called Glory City (1965)
- Secret Agent Fireball (1965)
- The Dolls (1965)
- Gunmen of the Rio Grande (1964)
- Samson and the Mighty Challenge (1964)
- Bullets Don't Argue (1964)
- Corpse for the Lady (1964)
- A Fistful of Dollars (1964)
- Sallah (1964)
- Vidas ardientes (1964)
- Seduced and Abandoned (1964)
- This Shocking World (1963)
- Gli onorevoli (1963)
- The Little Nuns (1963)
- Tutto è musica (1963)
- Obiettivo ragazze (1963)
- The Hours of Love (1963)
- La vita provvisoria (1963)
- The Sweet Nights (1962)
- Los motorizados (1962)
- La cuccagna (1962)
- Alone Against Rome (1962)
- Crazy Desire (1962)
- Malesia magica (1961)
- Pastasciutta nel deserto (1961)
- Pugni, pupe e marinai (1961)
- Los dos oficiales (1961)
- Divorce Italian Style (1961)
- America by Night (1961)
- Hercules in the Valley of Woe (1961)
- The Fascist (1961)
- Cinco marinos contra cien chicas (1961)
- Square of Violence (1961)
- Garibaldi (1961)
- Un mandarino per Teo (1960)
- Son of Samson (1960)
- Las píldoras de Hércules (1960)
- Kapò (1960)
- Escape by Night (1960)
- Call Girls of Rome (1960)
- Noi duri (1960)
- Genitori in blue-jeans (1960)
- La letra (1959)
- The Facts of Murder (1959)
- You're on Your Own (1959)
- La duchessa di Santa Lucia (1959)
- The Son of the Red Corsair (1959)
- The Woman's Confidant (1959)
- Vacaciones en Cortina D'Ampezzo (1959)
- Prisoner of the Volga (1959)
- Dubrowsky (1959)
- Il terribile Teodoro (1958)
- Le bellissime gambe di Sabrina (1958)
- Toto in Paris (1958)
- Sunday Is Always Sunday (1958)
- Giovani mariti (1958)
- The Lady Doctor (1958)
- Marisa (1957)
- Lust of the Vampire (1957)
- El día mas bello (1956)
- Totò lascia o raddoppia? (1956)
- Guardias de Roma (1956)
- Storia di una minorenne (1956)
- Diablillos de uniforme (1955)
- Revelación (1955)
- Esta noche nada nuevo (1955)
- La vena d'oro (1955)
- The Queen of Babylon (1954)
- Orient Express (1954)
- Miseria y nobleza (1954)
- Noi cannibali (1953)
- Neapolitan Turk (1953)
- Sul ponte dei sospiri (1953)
- Don Lorenzo (1952)
- At Sword's Edge (1952)
- Secret of Three Points (1952)
- The Adventures of Mandrin (1952)
- Viva il cinema! (1952)
- O.K. Nero (1951)
- It's Love That's Ruining Me (1951)
- Duello senza onore (1951)
- Figaro qua, Figaro là (1950)
- The Iron Swordsman (1949)
- The Other (1947)

=== As assistant director ===
- Peppino, le modelle e chella là (1957)
- Totò cerca pace (1954)
- Il medico dei pazzi (1954)
- Miseria y nobleza (1954)
- Las noches de Cleopatra (1954)
- Neapolitan Turk (1953)
- Siamo tutti inquilini (1953)
- Duello senza onore (1951)
- El fantasma es un vivo (1950)
- Le sei mogli di Barbablù (1950)
- Figaro qua, Figaro là (1950)
- Il vedovo allegro (1950)
- Totò cerca moglie (1950)
- Signorinella (1949)
- Totò le mokò (1949)
- Totó busca piso (1949)
- Man with the Grey Glove (1949)
- Come Back to Sorrento (1945)
