= Age & Scarpelli =

Italian screenwriting duo

Age & Scarpelli (Italian: [ˈaːdʒe e skarˈpɛlli]) is the stage name used by the pair of Italian screenwriters Agenore Incrocci (1914–2005) and Furio Scarpelli (1919–2010). Together, they wrote the scripts for about a hundred movies, mainly satirical comedies.

The duo started working together in Totò cerca casa of 1949, and ended their collaboration in the 1980s. They worked for many famous Italian directors, like Sergio Leone (The Good, the Bad and the Ugly), Mario Monicelli (including their major work, For Love and Gold), Dino Risi, Luigi Comencini, Pietro Germi and Ettore Scola and they wrote the dialogues of many Totò movies.

In 1985, they decided to part ways, and subsequently worked separately for movies such as Boom for Age and Il Postino: The Postman for Scarpelli. Age & Scarpelli are often considered the inventors of commedia all'italiana (Italian-style comedy).

== Selected filmography ==
- Toto Looks for a House (1949)
- 47 morto che parla (1950)
- Toto Looks for a Wife (1950)
- The Knight Has Arrived! (1950)
- Toto the Sheik (1950)
- Figaro Here, Figaro There (1950)
- Toto the Third Man (1951)
- Seven Hours of Trouble (1951)
- Toto and the Women (1952)
- Toto in Color (1952)
- The Enchanting Enemy (1953)
- Captain Phantom (1953)
- What Scoundrels Men Are! (1953)
- House of Ricordi (1954)
- Symphony of Love (1954)
- Toto and Carolina (1955)
- Don Camillo's Last Round (1955)
- La banda degli onesti (1956)
- The Bigamist (1956)
- Big Deal on Madonna Street (1958)
- The Law Is the Law (1958)
- The Great War (1959)
- Audace colpo dei soliti ignoti (1959)
- Everybody Go Home (1960)
- The Passionate Thief (1960)
- Love and Larceny (1960)
- Toto and Peppino Divided in Berlin (1962)
- La marcia su Roma (1962)
- Mafioso (1962)
- The Teacher from Vigevano (1963)
- The Organizer (1963)
- I Mostri (1963)
- Seduced and Abandoned (1964)
- For Love and Gold (1966)
- The Good, the Bad and the Ugly (1966)
- Torn Curtain (1966) : Alfred Hitchcock hired them to comment the initial script. They replied that the construction was good but the dialogues were flat.
- Torture Me But Kill Me with Kisses (1967)
- Brancaleone at the Crusades (1970)
- In the Name of the Italian People (1971)
- Come Home and Meet My Wife (1974)
- We All Loved Each Other So Much (1974)
- La terrazza (1980)
