= Mario Castellani =

Italian actor (1906–1978)

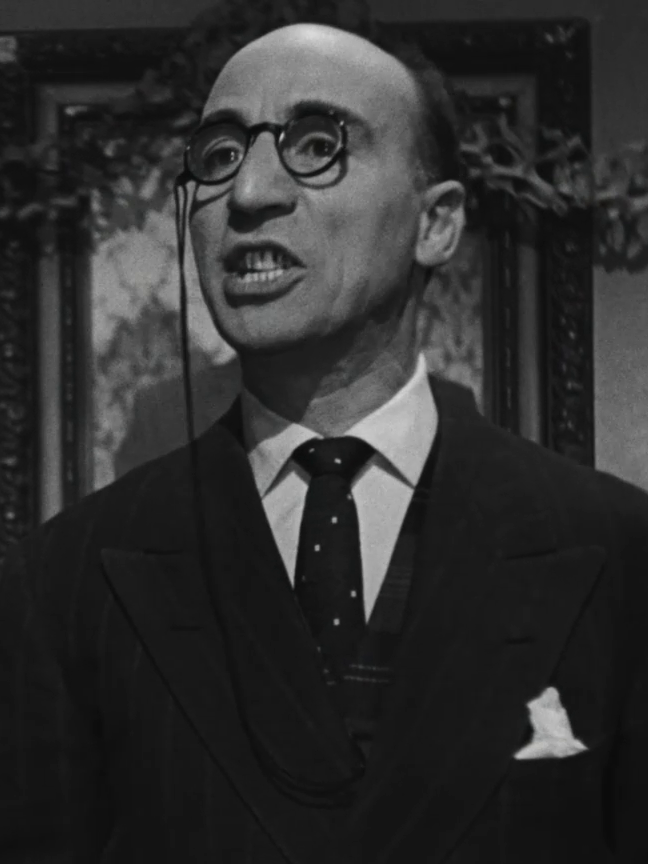
- Castellani in Chi si ferma è perduto (1960)
- Born: 24 November 1906; Rome, Kingdom of Italy
- Died: 25 April 1978 (aged 71); Rome, Italy
- Occupations: Actor; comedian
- Years active: 1924–1971

Mario Castellani (24 November 1906 – 25 April 1978) was an Italian comic actor, best known as the sidekick of famous comic actor Antonio De Curtis (Totò). He appeared with the latter in all his major movies, as well as many of Totò's theatre productions.

== Partial filmography ==
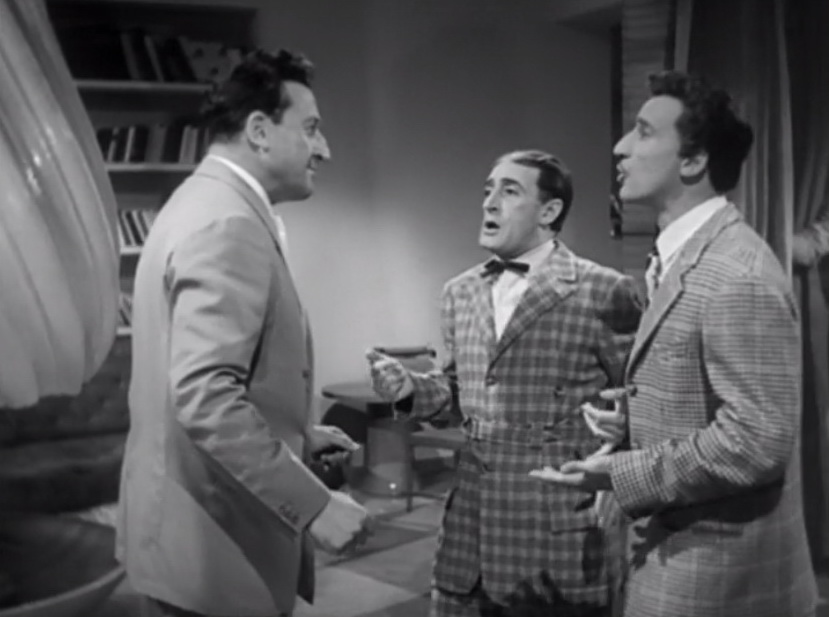
Mario Castellani (on the right) with Carlo Ninchi and Totò in Bluebeard's Six Wives (1950)

- Romulus and the Sabines (1945, directed by Mario Bonnard) - Il proprietario del teatro
- Down with Misery (1945, directed by Gennaro Righelli) - Un agente
- The Two Orphans (1947, directed by Mario Mattoli) - Il maggiordomo (uncredited)
- Fear and Sand (1948, directed by Mario Mattoli)
- Toto Tours Italy (1948, directed by Mario Mattoli) - Renato Stella, allenatore
- The Firemen of Viggiù (1949, directed by Mario Mattoli) - Jealous husband
- Toto Looks for a House (1949, directed by Steno and Mario Monicelli) - Truffatore
- The Emperor of Capri (1949, directed by Luigi Comencini) - Asdrubale Stinchi
- Totò Le Mokò (1949, directed by Carlo Ludovico Bragaglia) - Za, gang member
- Toto Looks for a Wife (1950, directed by Carlo Ludovico Bragaglia) - Filippo
- Figaro Here, Figaro There (1950, directed by Carlo Ludovico Bragaglia) - Roberto
- Tototarzan (1950, directed by Mario Mattoli) - Stanis
- Toto the Sheik (1950, directed by Mario Mattoli) - Il colonnello dei ribelli
- Bluebeard's Six Wives (1950, directed by Carlo Ludovico Bragaglia) - Amilcare
- 47 morto che parla (1950, directed by Carlo Ludovico Bragaglia) - Il colonello Bertrand de Tassiny
- Toto the Third Man (1951, directed by Mario Mattoli) - Alfredo
- Revenge of the Pirates (1951, directed by Primo Zeglio) - Armagnac
- La paura fa 90 (1951, directed by Giorgio Simonelli) - Avv. Lefevre
- Seven Hours of Trouble (1951, directed by Vittorio Metz and Marcello Marchesi) - Antonino
- Cops and Robbers (1951, directed by Steno and Mario Monicelli) - The Taxi Driver
- The Two Sergeants (1951, directed by Carlo Alberto Chiesa)
- Toto in Color (1952, directed by Steno) - On. Trombetta
- Deceit (1952, directed by Guido Brignone) - Ubriaco al night-club
- Five Paupers in an Automobile (1952, directed by Mario Mattoli) - Il regista
- Toto and the King of Rome (1952, directed by Steno and Mario Monicelli) - Corrado
- Toto and the Women (1952, directed by Steno and Mario Monicelli) - Rag. Carlini
- Man, Beast and Virtue (1953, directed by Steno) - The doctor
- Neapolitan Turk (1953, directed by Mario Mattoli) - L'onorevole Cocchetelli
- One of Those (1953, directed by Aldo Fabrizi) - Piero
- Funniest Show on Earth (1953, directed by Mario Mattoli) - Il domatore
- Of Life and Love (1954, episode La patente, directed by Luigi Zampa) - Altro avvocato
- Where Is Freedom? (1954, directed by Roberto Rossellini) - Il pubblico ministero
- A Slice of Life (1954, directed by Alessandro Blasetti) - (segment "La macchina fotografica")
- The Three Thieves (1954, directed by Lionello De Felice) - Ornano's Lawyer
- The Doctor of the Mad (1954, directed by Mario Mattoli) - Cristaldi
- Toto Seeks Peace (1954, directed by Mario Mattoli) - Testimone
- Toto and Carolina (1955, directed by Mario Monicelli) - Goffredo Barozzoli
- Toto in Hell (1955, directed by Camillo Mastrocinque) - Cri-Cri / Un marito
- I giorni più belli (1956, directed by Mario Mattoli) - L'ingegnere della banca
- Toto, Peppino, and the Hussy (1956, directed by Camillo Mastrocinque) - Mezzacapa
- Toto, Peppino and the Outlaws (1956, directed by Camillo Mastrocinque) - Un bandito
- Malafemmena (1957, directed by Armando Fizzarotti)
- La cambiale (1959, directed by Camillo Mastrocinque) - Avvocato Incarta
- I baccanali di Tiberio (1959, directed by Giorgio Simonelli)
- Tough Guys (1960, directed by Camillo Mastrocinque) - Alì
- Letto a tre piazze (1960, directed by Steno) - Il Preside
- Appuntamento a Ischia (1960, directed by Mario Mattoli) - Mina's Agent
- Who Hesitates is Lost (1960, directed by Sergio Corbucci) - Comm. Pasquetti
- Il corazziere (1960, directed by Camillo Mastrocinque) - L'ufficiale giudiziario
- Totò, Peppino e...la dolce vita (1961, directed by Sergio Corbucci) - Il Presidente
- Tototruffa 62 (1961, directed by Camillo Mastrocinque) - Teacher in 'Lausanne' College (uncredited)
- The Two Marshals (1961, directed by Sergio Corbucci) - Ladro che si confessa (uncredited)
- His Women (1961, directed by Ugo Tognazzi) - Virgilio De Rossi
- Sua Eccellenza si fermò a mangiare (1961, directed by Mario Mattoli)
- Totò Diabolicus (1962, directed by Steno) - Ispettore Scalarini
- Lo smemorato di Collegno (1962, directed by Sergio Corbucci) - Giorgio Ballarini
- Sexy Toto (1963, directed by Mario Amendola) - Guardia carceraria (Prison guard)
- Toto vs. the Four (1963, directed by Steno) - Lancetti
- The Monk of Monza (1963, directed by Sergio Corbucci) - Il nobile con due scarpe destre
- Le motorizzate (1963, directed by Marino Girolami) - Il Brigadiere dei Vigili Urbani (segment "Vigile ignoto") (uncredited)
- Toto and Cleopatra (1963, directed by Fernando Cerchio) - Il chirurgo cranico reale
- Gli onorevoli (1963, directed by Sergio Corbucci) - Segretario (uncredited)
- The Commandant (1963, directed by Paolo Heusch) - Castelletti
- Toto vs. the Black Pirate (1964, directed by Fernando Cerchio) - Il pirata con l'uncino
- What Ever Happened to Baby Toto? (1964, directed by Ottavio Alessi, in reality by Paolo Heusch) - Direttore del Riformatorio
- Toto of Arabia (1964, directed by José Antonio De La Loma, in reality by Paolo Heusch) - El agente americano
- I figli del leopardo (1965, directed by Sergio Corbucci)
- Latin Lovers (1965, directed by Mario Costa) - Un paziente (segment "Amore e morte")
- Ringo e Gringo contro tutti (1966, directed by Bruno Corbucci) - Sceriffo
- Totò Ye Ye (1967, TV Movie, directed by Daniele D'Anza) - Compagno del 'capellone'
- Totò story (1968, directed by various)
- The Specialists (1969) - Judge Ham
- Er Più – storia d'amore e di coltello (1971, directed by Sergio Corbucci) - Il Dottore
- Totò, une anthologie (1978, directed by Jean-Louis Comolli)
