= Orient Express (1954 film) =

1954 drama film

- Directed by: Carlo Ludovico Bragaglia
- Written by: Jacques Companéez; Vitaliano Brancati; Aldo De Benedetti; Agenore Incrocci; Vittorio Nino Novarese
- Produced by: Raymond Borderie; Lucien Masson
- Starring: Silvana Pampanini; Henri Vidal; Eva Bartok
- Cinematography: Luciano Tonti
- Edited by: Roberto Cinquini
- Music by: Renzo Rossellini
- Production companies: Fono Roma; La Société des Films Sirius; Meteor-Film
- Distributed by: CEI Incom
- Release date: 8 October 1954
- Running time: 100 minutes
- Countries: Italy; France; West Germany
- Language: Italian

Orient Express is a 1954 drama film directed by Carlo Ludovico Bragaglia and starring Silvana Pampanini, Henri Vidal, Folco Lulli, Eva Bartok, and Curd Jürgens. It was made as a co-production between Italy, France and West Germany.

It was shot at the Farnesina Studios of Titanus in Rome and on location in the Dolomites. The film's sets were designed by the art director Ottavio Scotti.

== Plot ==
The plot revolves around a two-day stop at a village in the Alps by passengers on the Orient Express.

== Reviews ==
The national and international reviews were mostly bad. Below are three examples:

"Intermezzo" wrote: "The Italian and German film industries collaborated in the production of this film, which, judging by the results, did not deserve so much fervor of international activity."

Der Spiegel wrote: “After 150 long meters, the express gets stuck in an avalanche of snow and the film gets stuck in a conglomeration of boredom and acting mistakes (Silvana Pampanini and Eva Bartok), which proves once again that co-productions are often not just a cost - but also bring about a reduction in quality.”

The Lexikon des Internationales Films states: "One of the first major international co-productions with German participation after the Second World War: with popular film stars, but without speed, excitement and credibility."

== Cast ==
- Silvana Pampanini as Beatrice Landi
- Henri Vidal as Jacques Ferrand
- Folco Lulli as Filippo dal Pozzo
- Robert Arnoux as Jean Tribot aka Mr. Davis
- Eva Bartok as Roxane
- Curd Jürgens as Bate
- Michael Lenz as Giovanni
- Liliane Bert as Agnès, the pharmacist
- Olga Solbelli as Olga, la ricevitrice postale
- Gemma Bolognesi
- Arturo Bragaglia
- Giuseppe Chinnici
- Liliana de Curtis
- Anita Durante
- Ugo Filipponi
- Ivo Garrani
- Mimma Gheducci
- Iga Ritzenfeld
- Sandro Ruffini
- Tullio Tomadoni

== Bibliography ==
- Chiti, Roberto & Poppi, Roberto. Dizionario del cinema italiano: Dal 1945 al 1959. Gremese Editore, 1991.
- Wiesenthal, Mauricio. The belle époque of the Orient-Express. Crescent Books, 1979.
