= Vincenzo Talarico =

Italian screenwriter

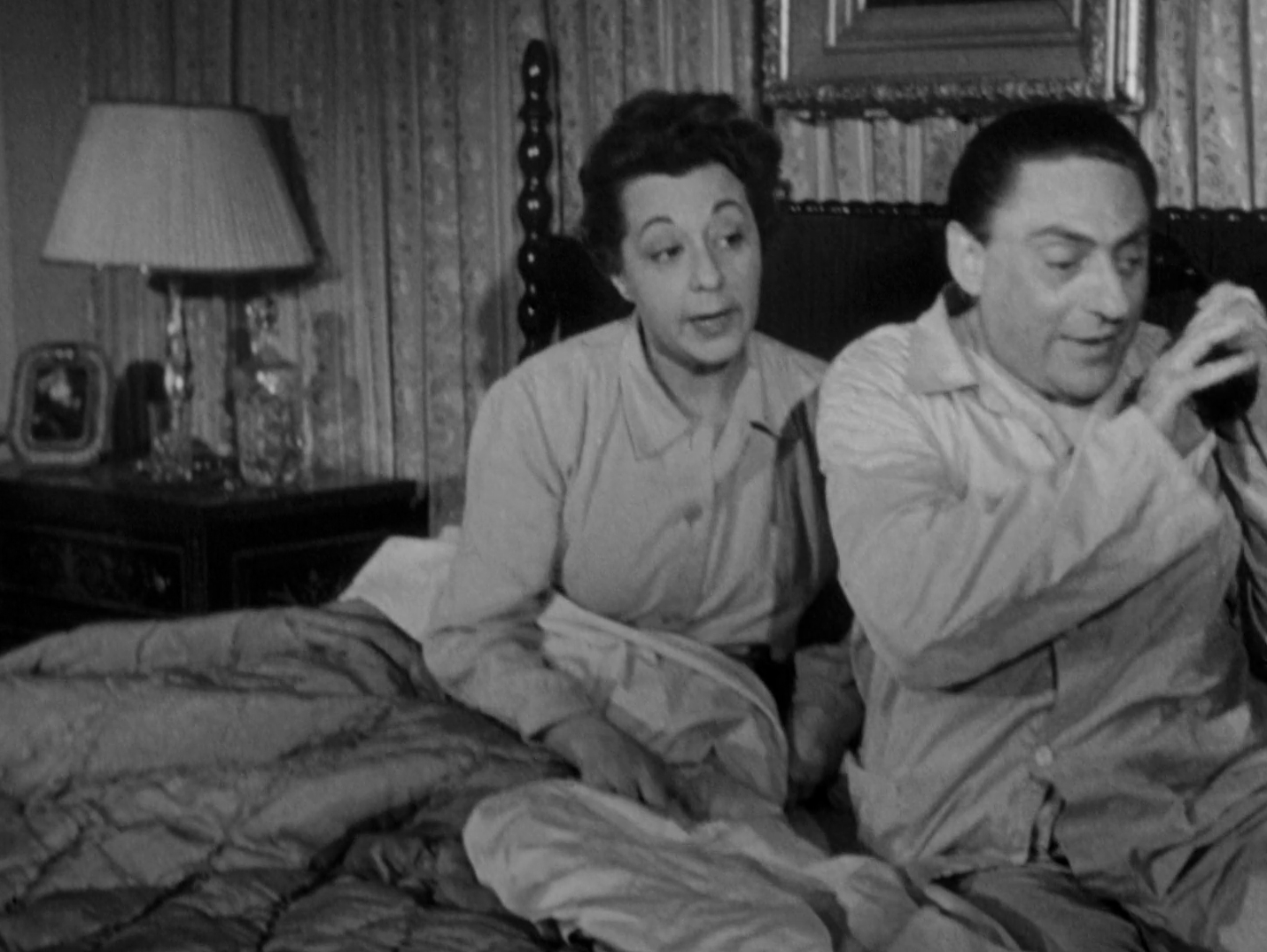
- Gianna Dauro and Vincenzo Talarico, on the right, in An American in Rome (1954).
- Born: 28 April 1909; Acri, Italy
- Died: 16 August 1972 (aged 63); Fiuggi, Italy
- Occupations: Screenwriter, actor
- Years active: 1940-1966

Vincenzo Talarico (28 April 1909 – 16 August 1972), was an Italian screenwriter and film actor. He wrote for 27 films between 1940 and 1966. He also appeared in 15 films between 1946 and 1964. He was born in Acri, Italy and died in Fiuggi, Italy.

== Selected filmography ==
Screenwriter

- A Woman Has Fallen (1941)
- A Little Wife (1943)
- Eleven Men and a Ball (1948)
- The Wolf of the Sila (1949)
- The Devil in the Convent (1950)
- Easy Years (1953)
- The Doctor of the Mad (1954)
- Where Is Freedom? (1954)
- It Happened at the Police Station (1954)
- Toto Seeks Peace (1954)
- Scandal in Sorrento (1955)
- The Bigamist (1956)
- Il Conte di Matera (1957)
- The Moralist (1959)

Actor

- Professor, My Son (1946) - Insegnante (uncredited)
- No Peace Under the Olive Tree (1950) - L'avvocato difensore di Francesco
- A Day in Court (1954) - Avvocato difensore
- Where Is Freedom? (1954) - L'avvocato difensore
- An American in Rome (1954) - Onorevole Borgiano
- Toto Seeks Peace (1954) - Avvocato
- The Two Friends (1955) - Lorenzucci
- The Letters Page (1955) - Mambrini, Newspaper Editor (uncredited)
- The Bigamist (1956) - L'avvocato della parte civile
- The Moralist (1959) - O. I. M. P. Employee
- Il Mattatore (1960) - Un poliziotto (uncredited)
- Sanremo - La grande sfida (1960)
- The Traffic Policeman (1960) - Oratore monarchico
- Le ambiziose (1961) - L'organizzatore
- Adultero lui, adultera lei (1963) - L'avvocato Bianchi
- La pupa (1963)
- Oltraggio al pudore (1964)
- I complessi (1965) - Himself (segment "Guglielmo il Dentone")
- Me, Me, Me... and the Others (1966) - Indro (uncredited)
