= Break Up (1965 film) =

1965 film

- A poster with the film's alternative English title:The Man with the Balloons
- Directed by: Marco Ferreri
- Written by: Marco Ferreri; Rafael Azcona
- Produced by: Carlo Ponti
- Starring: Marcello Mastroianni
- Cinematography: Aldo Tonti
- Music by: Teo Usuelli
- Release date: 1965
- Running time: 85 minutes
- Country: Italy
- Language: Italian

Break Up (Italian: L'uomo dei cinque palloni and also known as The Man with the Balloons) is a 1965 Italian comedy film directed by Marco Ferreri.

== Plot ==
A Milanese entrepreneur becomes obsessed with how much air a balloon can take before it breaks. His inability to control this detail destroys his perfect life, leading to madness.

== Cast ==
- Marcello Mastroianni as Mario
- Catherine Spaak as Giovanna
- William Berger as Benny
- Antonio Altoviti
- Sonia Romanoff as Sonia
- Igi Polidoro
- Charlotte Folcher
- Ugo Tognazzi as Man With Car (uncredited)
