= The Bigamist (1956 film) =

1956 film

- Film poster
- Directed by: Luciano Emmer
- Written by: Sergio Amidei; Agenore Incrocci; Francesco Rosi; Furio Scarpelli; Vincenzo Talarico
- Produced by: Guido Giambartolomei; Carlo Salsano
- Starring: Marcello Mastroianni
- Cinematography: Mario Montuori
- Edited by: Otello Colangeli
- Music by: Alessandro Cicognini
- Release date: 20 September 1956
- Running time: 110 minutes
- Country: Italy
- Language: Italian

The Bigamist (Italian: Il bigamo) is a 1956 Italian comedy film directed by Luciano Emmer.

== Plot ==
Mario De Santis, an enterprising trade representative who sells toothpastes, regularly married to Valeria, sees his life upset by the accusation of being bigamous. Accompanied to the police station, he is confronted with a certain Isolina Fornaciari, whom he would have married in Forlimpopoli a few years earlier. Mario, furious at the accusation, goes into de facto ways with Isolina's father, with whom he has a fight so much that he is put under arrest. Moreover, no one seems to believe in his innocence, not even his wife, who lets herself be negatively influenced by her sister and the family lawyer.

When Mario is granted bail, his case is entrusted to an eccentric prince of the forum, talkative and extravagant. A friend of Mario's, met in prison, realizes that it could be a case of the same name and sets out to travel all over Rome in search of Isolina's real husband. When he finds him, he manages to drag him to court where, in the meantime, Mario - following the advice of his defender - has pleaded guilty. Thus the court, while recognizing him innocent of the charge of bigamy, condemns him for self-malignancy; and Isolina, who, complicated by her condition as an elderly single girl, had exploited the circumstance to try to frame a handsome man, is in turn condemned for perjury. Having served the small sentence inflicted on him, Mario can finally return to the arms of his family, who are waiting for him at the exit of the prison.

== Cast ==
- Marcello Mastroianni - Mario De Santis
- Franca Valeri - Isolina Fornaciari
- Giovanna Ralli - Valeria Masetti
- Marisa Merlini - Enza Masetti
- Vittorio De Sica - L'onorevole Principe / Attorney Principe
- Memmo Carotenuto - Quirino Proietti
- Ave Ninchi - La signora Masetti / Missis Masetti
- Vincenzo Talarico - L'avvocato di parte civile
- Guglielmo Inglese - Don Vincenzino
- Mario Passante
- Fernando Milani
- Ruggero Marchi
- Salvo Randone
- Anita Durante - Amalia
