= Come Home and Meet My Wife =

- Directed by: Mario Monicelli
- Written by: Mario Monicelli; Age & Scarpelli
- Starring: Ugo Tognazzi; Ornella Muti; Michele Placido
- Cinematography: Luigi Kuveiller
- Edited by: Ruggero Mastroianni
- Music by: Enzo Jannacci
- Release date: 1974
- Country: Italy
- Language: Italian

Come Home and Meet My Wife (Italian: Romanzo popolare, lit. 'Popular Novel') is a 1974 Italian comedy drama film co-written and directed by Mario Monicelli. The film won the David di Donatello for Best Script.

== Cast ==
- Ugo Tognazzi as Giulio Basletti
- Ornella Muti as Vincenzina Rotunno
- Michele Placido as Giovanni Pizzullo
- Pippo Starnazza as Salvatore
- Nicolina Papetti as Salvatore's wife
- Vincenzo Crocitti as Maronati
- Alvaro Vitali as the car driver

== Production ==
The role of Giulio was originally conceived for Nino Manfredi, who sought to revise the character and contribute to the screenplay, but Monicelli declined. Following Ugo Tognazzi's casting, the film setting was moved from Rome to Milan.

== Reception ==
The film was a massive success domestically, grossing over 3,8 billion lire and being the sixth highest-grossing release at the Italian box office in the 1974–75 season.
