= Black City (film) =

1961 film

- Directed by: Duilio Coletti
- Written by: John Fante; Duilio Coletti
- Produced by: Dino De Laurentiis
- Cinematography: Leonida Barboni
- Music by: Carlo Savina
- Release date: 1961
- Country: Italy
- Language: Italian

Black City (Italian: Il re di Poggioreale, lit. 'The King of Poggioreale') is a 1961 Italian comedy-drama film directed by Duilio Coletti. It is based on real life events of camorra criminal Peppino Navarra.

It stars the American actors Ernest Borgnine and Keenan Wynn.

== Plot ==
Peppino Navarra, the top gangster in Naples, clashes with a police inspector and a United States Army general.

== Cast ==
- Ernest Borgnine as Peppino Navarra
- Keenan Wynn as Di Gennaro
- David Opatoshu as Commissioner Natalucci
- Yvonne Sanson as Mariannina
- Cristina Gajoni as Pupetta
- Salvo Randone as Vescovo
- Lino Ventura as Bandit
- Sergio Tofano as Count Pignatelli
- Aldo Giuffrè as Brigadiere Crisquolo
- Max Cartier as Enrico
- Carlo Pisacane as Abbate
- Rosita Pisano as Donna Amalia
- Giacomo Furia as Ministro Califano
- Nino Vingelli as Ministro Sgarra
- Renato Terra as Agente
- Guido Celano as Brigadiere
