= Toto of Arabia =

- Directed by: José Antonio de la Loma
- Written by: Bruno Corbucci; Giovanni Grimaldi
- Produced by: Alberto Pugliese; Luciano Ercoli
- Starring: Totò
- Cinematography: Aldo Nascimbene
- Music by: Angelo Francesco Lavagnino
- Release date: 1965
- Running time: 84 min
- Countries: Italy; Spain
- Language: Italian

Toto of Arabia (Italian: Totò d'Arabia, Spanish: Toto de Arabia) is a 1965 Italian-Spanish adventure-comedy film directed by José Antonio de la Loma. It is a parody of Lawrence of Arabia and of spy films.

== Plot ==
Toto, a former Italian military service who works as a servant at the British Intelligence Service, is promoted to secret agent with the name of Agent 00Ø8 in order to convince the ruler of Shamara, Sheikh Ali El Buzur, to yield oil to UK.

== Cast ==
- Totò: Agent 00Ø8 Toto
- Nieves Navarro: Doris
- Fernando Sancho: Sheikh Ali el Buzur
- George Rigaud: Sir Bains
- Mario Castellani: Omar el Bedù
- Luigi Pavese: Sheikh Ali di Shamara
- Luis Cuenca: El Kasser
- Víctor Israel: Boris
