= Anna Campori =

Italian actress (1917–2018)

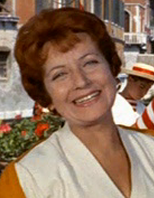
- Anna Campori in a scene of the movie Venice, the Moon and You (1958)
- Born: 22 September 1917; Rome, Kingdom of Italy
- Died: 19 January 2018 (aged 100); Rome, Italy
- Occupation: Actress

Anna Campori (22 September 1917 – 19 January 2018) was an Italian actress. From 1951 onwards, she appeared in 70 films.

== Life and career ==
Born in Rome, Italy, after the debut on stage in a small company of prose Campori moved shortly after into avanspettacolo and revue, entering the company of the De Vico Brothers with whom she toured across Italy during the Second World War.

After her marriage to Pietro De Vico, she became the prima donna in the companies he founded, even still appearing on several stage comedies of other companies.

Campori was also an active character actress for films and television series, a voice actress and a radio hostess. She made her last appearance in the TV series Carabinieri.

She turned 100 in September 2017 and died on 19 January 2018.

== Selected filmography ==
- Una bruna indiavolata! (1951) – Signora Cartoni
- We Two Alone (1952) – Fillide
- Neapolitan Turk (1953) – Concettella
- La pattuglia dell'Amba Alagi (1953) – Moglie del sindaco
- The Doctor of the Mad (1954) – Una signora
- It Happened at the Police Station (1954) – The woman protesting against the strike
- Assi alla ribalta (1954)
- The Song of the Heart (1955) – Maddalena
- L'ultimo amante (1955) – La nuova inquilina
- Il coraggio (1955) – Ginevra
- Suor Maria (1955) – Cameriera della pensione
- La ragazza di via Veneto (1955)
- I giorni più belli (1956) – La madre di Carletto
- Ci sposeremo a Capri (1956) – Pasquale Caputo's Wife
- Occhi senza luce (1956) – Maid
- Il canto dell'emigrante (1956)
- Song of Naples (1957) – Oreste Antignano's Wife
- Susanna Whipped Cream (1957) – La madre di Susanna
- La canzone del destino (1957)
- C'è un sentiero nel cielo (1957) – The Restaurant Owner
- Serenate per 16 bionde (1957) – The Woman enjoying the Show
- Il cocco di mamma (1957) – Laura Tarantini's Mother
- A sud niente di nuovo (1957)
- Venice, the Moon and You (1958) – Claudia
- Mia nonna poliziotto (1958) – Padrona di casa
- Toto, Peppino and the Fanatics (1958)
- The Friend of the Jaguar (1959) – Gianna
- Prepotenti più di prima (1959) – Signora Norma
- I Tartassati (1959) – Dora Pezzella
- Le cameriere (1959) – La signora Marini
- Winter Holidays (1959) – Virginia
- Quel tesoro di papà (1959) – Amalia
- Ferdinando I, re di Napoli (1959) – The angry Lottery Player (uncredited)
- Perfide.... ma belle (1959)
- Nel blu dipinto di blu (1959) – Donata's 1st Employer (uncredited)
- The Employee (1960) – Lisetta
- Gastone (1960)
- I piaceri dello scapolo (1960) – La Padrona di Casa
- My Friend, Dr. Jekyll (1960) – Clarissa de Matteis
- Caccia al marito (1960) – The Widow with seven children
- Who Hesitates Is Lost (1960) – Italia, Guardalavecchia's wife
- Sua Eccellenza si fermò a mangiare (1961) – The Innkeeper's Wife (uncredited)
- Pesci d'oro e bikini d'argento (1961)
- Leoni al sole (1961)
- Rocco e le sorelle (1961)
- I soliti rapinatori a Milano (1963)
- Le motorizzate (1963) – Cacace's Wife (segment "Il Vigile Ignoto")
- Gli onorevoli (1963) – Signora La Trippa
- The Four Musketeers (1963)
- Napoleone a Firenze (1964)
- Te lo leggo negli occhi (1965) – Elsa
- Ischia operazione amore (1966) – Rosalia – Gennaro's wife
- Una ragazza tutta d'oro (1967) – Iva Zanelli's Mother
- Riderà! (Cuore matto) (1967) – Madre di Antonio
- Ric e Gian alla conquista del West (1967) – Irene Jefferson
- Cuore matto... matto da legare (1967)
- I ragazzi di Bandiera Gialla (1968)
- Il suo nome è Donna Rosa (1969) – Carmela
- Io non spezzo... rompo (1971) – Elena – wife of Riccardo
- Storia di fifa e di coltello – Er seguito d'er più (1972) – Teresa Landolfi ved. Campitelli
- City Under Siege (1974)
- Pierino medico della Saub (1981) – Suor Celestina
- Giggi il bullo (1982)
- No Thanks, Coffee Makes Me Nervous (1982)
- Ladri di futuro (1991)
- Natasha Stefanenko : La gigantessa (2001) – Natasha Stefanenko (voice)
- The Accidental Detective (2003) – Gegia
- Those Happy Years (2013) – Bisnonna

== See also ==
- List of centenarians (actors, filmmakers and entertainers)
