= Liliana de Curtis =

Italian actress (1933–2022)

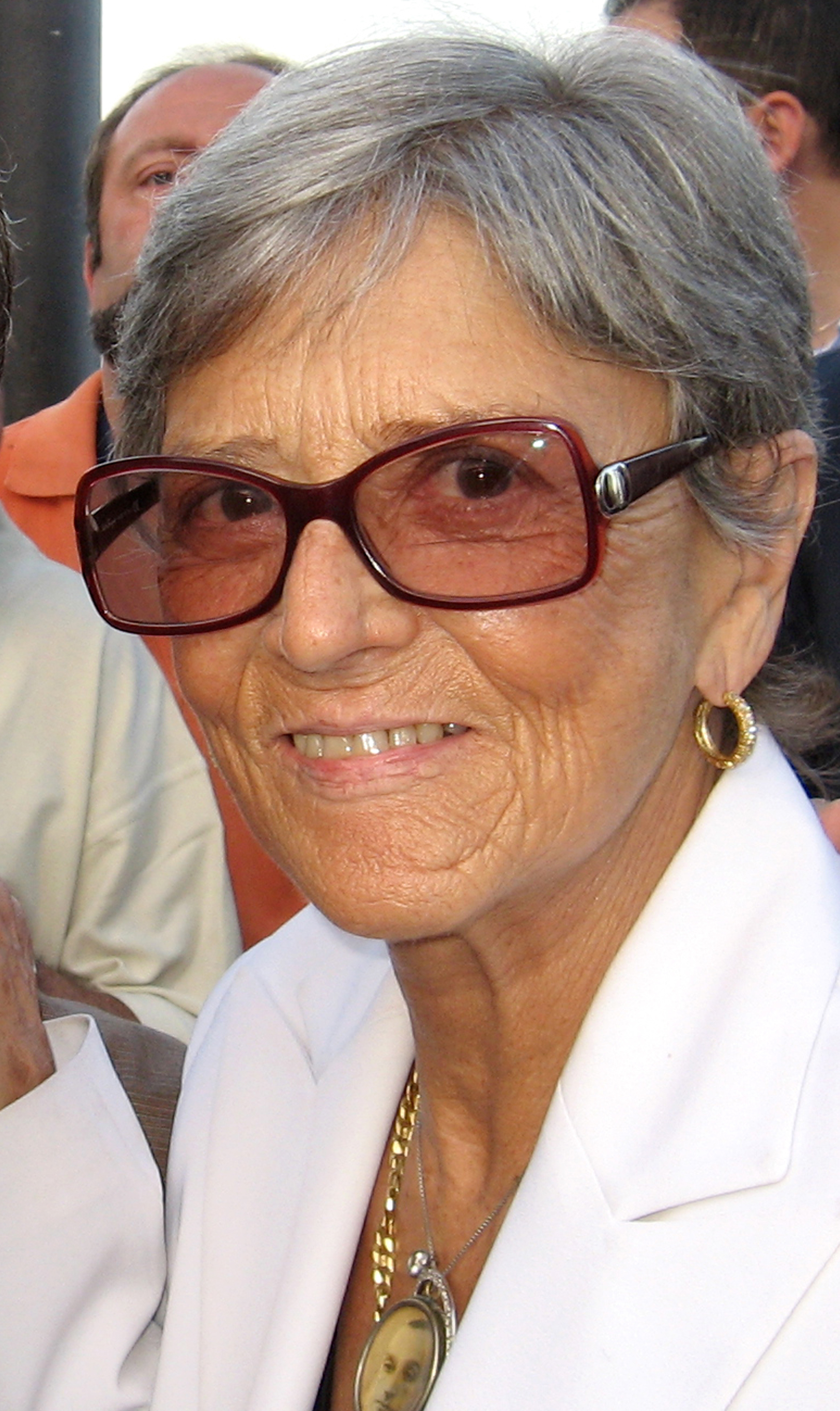
- De Curtis in 2007
- Born: Liliana Focas Flavio Angelo Ducas Comneno de Curtis di Bisanzio Gagliardi; 10 May 1933; Rome, Kingdom of Italy
- Died: 3 June 2022 (aged 89); Rome, Italy
- Occupations: Actress; writer
- Years active: 1953–2002
- Spouses: Gianni Buffardi (m. 1951; sep. 1964); Sergio Anticoli
- Children: 3
- Parents: Totò (father); Diana Bandini Rogliani (mother)

Liliana Focas Flavio Angelo Ducas Comneno de Curtis di Bisanzio Gagliardi (10 May 1933 – 3 June 2022), commonly known as Liliana de Curtis, was an Italian actress and writer. She was the daughter of Totò and Diana Bandini Rogliani.

== Early life ==
De Curtis was born in Rome, Italy, on 10 May 1933. Her given name was chosen by her father, Neapolitan actor Totò, in memory of Liliana Castagnola, to whom he had been romantically linked before joining Diana Rogliani and who had committed suicide for him.

== Career ==
De Curtis had a brief experience in cinema, participating in the shooting of the film Saint John, the Beheaded in 1940 and appearing in the 1954 film Orient Express. She appeared in a half-hour documentary for Rai 3 entitled I knew him well, with speeches by Ninetto Davoli and Giacomo Furia. In 2007 she interpreted herself commenting in voice on the television program We are the United States.

In the theater, de Curtis collaborated with author-actor Antonino Miele, with whom she acted in the plays Pardon Monsieur Totò (alongside Vito Cesaro as well) and Totò behind the scenes (directed by Mario Di Gilio). With Miele himself and Matilde Amorosi she wrote the book Every limit has a patience, published by Rizzoli Editore and dedicated to Totò. She was often a guest on television, in reminiscent broadcasts of the figure of her father, of which she promoted the memory with events in various places in Italy, also dedicating biographical books, including Malafemmena, published in 2009 by Arnoldo Mondadori Editore.

== Personal life ==
De Curtis had two children, Antonello and Diana, from her first marriage to film producer Gianni Buffardi whom she married in 1951. Subsequently, the marriage with Buffardi failed after a few years and she married Sergio Anticoli, with whom she had her daughter Elena (born in 1969, and founder of the commercial brand "CafféTotò").

On 8 December 2011, after a long illness, her daughter Diana died. Diana's ashes were interred in the cemetery of Santa Maria del Pianto, Naples, the same place where her grandfather is buried. On 21 September 2013, de Curtis attended the feast of San Gennaro organized in Naples, where she received a lifetime achievement award.

De Curtis died in her home in Rome on 3 June 2022, at the age of 89.
