= Arrivano i dollari! =

1957 film directed by Mario Costa

- Directed by: Mario Costa
- Written by: Ruggero Maccari; Giovanni Grimaldi; Gigliola Falluto; Giuseppe Mangione
- Story by: Fulvio Pazziloro
- Starring: Alberto Sordi; Nino Taranto
- Cinematography: Tino Santoni
- Edited by: Mario Serandrei
- Music by: Carlo Innocenzi
- Release date: 1957
- Language: Italian

Arrivano i dollari! (i. e. "The dollars are coming!") is a 1957 Italian comedy film directed by Mario Costa and starring Alberto Sordi, Nino Taranto and Isa Miranda.

== Plot ==
Arduino Pasti, poor left Italy and search fortune in South Africa, at his dead left a good Inheritance for own five nephews in Italy. Giuseppe Pasti and his brother Alfonso think every tricks for achieve maximum amount and for that try to make a fake good impression to widow of uncle Arduino and female notary.

== Cast ==
- Alberto Sordi as Count Alfonso Pasti
- Nino Taranto as Giuseppe Pasti
- Isa Miranda as Caterina Marchetti
- Mario Riva as Cesaretto Pasti
- Riccardo Billi as Michelino Pasti
- Rita Giannuzzi as Hélène Marigny
- Sergio Raimondi (actor) as Piero Pasti
- Turi Pandolfini as Alfonso's Butler
- Piera Arico as Lola
- Diana Dei as Clara
- Ignazio Balsamo as Ernesto
- Rosita Pisano as Rosina
- Natale Cirino as Vincenzo
