= The Moralist =

1959 film

- Directed by: Giorgio Bianchi
- Written by: Rodolfo Sonego; Vincenzo Talarico; Luciana Corda; Oreste Biancoli; Ettore Margadonna
- Starring: Alberto Sordi; Vittorio De Sica; Franca Valeri
- Cinematography: Alvaro Mancori
- Edited by: Adriana Novelli
- Music by: Carlo Savina; Fred Buscaglione
- Release date: 30 June 1959
- Running time: 100 minutes
- Country: Italy
- Language: Italian

The Moralist (Italian: Il moralista) is a 1959 Italian comedy film directed by Giorgio Bianchi. Starring Alberto Sordi and Vittorio de Sica, it satirises both the upholders of traditional sexual morality and the exploiters selling sex in a willing market.

== Plot ==
In Rome in 1959, Agostino is the ferocious new Secretary-General of the Italian branch of the worldwide International Organization for Public Morality. A teetotal bachelor, he attacks with vigour public manifestations of sexual immorality. Neither bribes nor female charms deflect him from his crusade against lewdness in films and night clubs. So devoted is he that the aristocratic President of the Organisation even considers he might be a husband for his so far unmarried 29-year-old daughter.

But both President and Secretary-General also have private lives. After Agostino denounces a night club to the police and it is closed, the mistress of the owner befriends the widowed President and introduces him to an exclusive brothel. Meanwhile, Agostino is representing Italy at the annual congress of the Organisation in Munich and, after hours, recruits a stripper to work in Rome. Visiting a theatrical agent, in reality a white slaver, he also recruits a troupe of African dancers, all illegal immigrants. Integral to the deal is that after each show they must entertain private clients.

The police have been closing in on Agostino, who has a long history, and he is arrested. When the inspector says the charge is white slaving, he protests that the artistes were black.

== Cast ==
- Alberto Sordi: Agostino
- Vittorio De Sica: The O. I. M. P. President
- Franca Valeri: Virginia
- Christiane Nielsen: Marga
- Mara Berni: Vera Serni
- Maria Perschy: Monique
- Franco Fabrizi: Giovanni
- Piera Arico: Giovanni's Wife
- Liana Del Balzo: Baroness
- Vincenzo Talarico: O. I. M. P. Employee
- Leopoldo Trieste: Advertising Designer
- Lydia Simoneschi: Vera's Mother
- Carl Wery: Kruger
- Ciccio Barbi: Police Commissioner
- Hazel Rogers: Herself
- Sylvia Lopez: Woman in the Nightclub in Munich
