= Saint John, the Beheaded =

1940 film

Saint John, the Beheaded (San Giovanni decollato)
- Directed by: Amleto Palermi; Giorgio Bianchi
- Written by: Nino Martoglio (play); Aldo Vergano; Cesare Zavattini; Amleto Palermi
- Produced by: Liborio Capitani
- Starring: Totò; Titina De Filippo; Silvana Jachino; Franco Coop
- Cinematography: Fernando Risi
- Edited by: Duilio A. Lucarelli
- Music by: Alexandre Derevitsky
- Production company: Produzione Capitani Film
- Distributed by: ENIC
- Release date: 12 December 1940
- Running time: 84 minutes
- Country: Italy
- Language: Italian

Saint John, the Beheaded (Italian: San Giovanni decollato) is a 1940 Italian comedy film directed by Amleto Palermi and Giorgio Bianchi and starring Totò, Titina De Filippo and Silvana Jachino. It was based on a play by Nino Martoglio. The film was made at the Cinecittà Studios in Rome.

San Giovanni decollato or Saint John the Baptist's head on a platter, was a common religious motif from the Middle Ages on, parodied in the film's poster.

== Plot ==
In a town, near Naples, in 1900, the cobbler Agostino Miciacio is accused by tenants of his apartment building to be crazy. In fact Agostino is a lively man, mocked by everyone because he is messy. He is very devoted to John the Baptist, so Agostino lights a candle every night in a small chapel in the courtyard. But some of the oil in the wax necessary for the luminary, disappears every night. It is a fact that Agostino does not tolerate theft, but he does not know that behind these thefts continue, there is a gang of thugs. Meanwhile, Agostino, in addition to following the case of oil stolen, must fight against the daughter Serafina who has fallen in love with a poor young lamplighter. But he also has to fight against his wife Concetta, authoritative and cruel woman, so he hopes that St. John makes a grace for him, taking away her voice.

== Cast ==
- Totò as mastro Agostino Miciacio
- Titina De Filippo as Concetta, la moglie
- Silvana Jachino as Serafina, la figlia
- Franco Coop as don Raffaele, il barbiere
- Osvaldo Genazzani as Giorgio Maria Santapaola, il fidanzato di Serafina
- Bella Starace Sainati as nonna Provvidenza
- Eduardo Passarelli as Orazio, il lampionaio
- Augusto Di Giovanni as don Peppino Esposito
- Mario Siletti as Teodoro Cupis, l'amministratore
- Giacomo Almirante as il pretore
- Oreste Bilancia as testimone al processo
- Peppino Villani as inquilino del vaglia
- Peppino Spadaro as mastro Vincenzo, il calzolaio
- Grazia Spadaro as Rosalia
- Dina Romano as donna Filomena, la cartomante
- Renato Chiantoni as l'avvocato difensore
- Gorella Gori as testimone al processo
- Edmondo Starace as cancelliere
- Maso Marcellini as don Benedetto
- Vincenzo Fummo as inquilino
- Mario Ersanilli as ometto dalla barba bianca
- Emilio Petacci as il Pubblico Ministero Lanzetti
- Raffaele Balsamo as inquilino del palazzo
- Liliana De Curtis as bambina che ritira le scarpe protestando sul prezzo
- Milla Papa

== Bibliography ==
- Moliterno, Gino. Historical Dictionary of Italian Cinema. Scarecrow Press, 2008.
