= Franca Faldini =

Italian writer, journalist and actress (1931–2016)

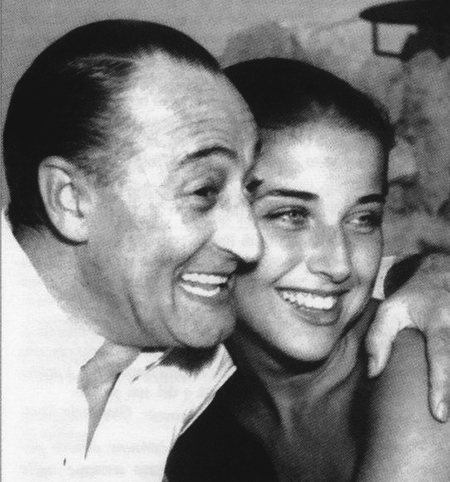
- Faldini (right) with Totò
- Born: 10 February 1931; Rome, Kingdom of Italy
- Died: 22 July 2016 (aged 85); Rome, Italy
- Occupations: Actress; journalist; writer
- Spouse: Nicolò Borghese (m. 1975)
- Children: 1

Franca Faldini (10 February 1931 – 22 July 2016) was an Italian writer, journalist and actress.

== Life and career ==
Born in Rome into a middle-class Jewish family, Faldini was forced to flee to Tuscany because of the Fascist racial laws. After the war, she was noticed by Ben Stahl, who pictured her in a painting called "Moment at Villa D'Este" for the magazine Esquire. She later moved to Hollywood, where she won a beauty pageant for aspiring actresses called "Miss Cheesecake", and made her film debut in Sailor Beware.

Returning to Italy, where she was initially billed as "The Italian who comes from Hollywood", Faldini started a relationship with the popular comedian Totò, also appearing in several of his films. In 1954, they had a son, Massenzio, who died a few hours after his birth. Totò dedicated a song to her, "Principessa" (Italian for 'Princess').

In 1955, dissatisfied with her roles, Faldini retired from acting, making occasional returns in 1957, when she replaced on stage the injured main actress Franca Maj in a revue alongside Totò, and in 1998, appearing in Incontri proibiti (Italian for 'Prohibited encounters'), the last film by Alberto Sordi. Faldini eventually started a career as a journalist and writer, co-writing with Goffredo Fofi a history of Italian cinema, L'Avventurosa storia del cinema italiano (Italian for 'The adventurous history of Italian cinema'), and writing several books about Totò.

== Filmography ==
Year	Title	Role	Notes
1952	Sailor Beware	Bit Role	Uncredited
1952	Toto and the Women	La signora dell'appuntamento	
1953	Man, Beast and Virtue	Mariannina	
1953	Neapolitan Turk	Angelica	
1953	Funniest Show on Earth	Yvonne, la soubrette	
1954	Where Is Freedom?	Maria	
1954	Poverty and Nobility	Nadia	
1955	Toto in Hell	Maria	
1955	Are We Men or Corporals?	Gabriella	
1998	Incontri proibiti	Alessandra Andreoli	(final film role)

== Sources ==
- Mallozzi, Giuseppe (2023). Alberto Sordi: Quaderni di Visioni Corte Film Festival. Ali Ribelli Edizioni. ISBN 979-12-5540-106-3.
