= I ladri =

- Italian poster
- Directed by: Lucio Fulci
- Written by: Lucio Fulci; Marcello Coscia; Marino Onorati; Vittorio Vighi; Nanni Loy; Ottavio Jemma
- Produced by: Roberto Capitani; Luigi Mondello
- Starring: Totò; Armando Calvo; Giovanna Ralli
- Cinematography: Manuel Berenguer
- Edited by: Juan Pisón; Gino Talamo
- Music by: Carlo Innocenzi
- Production companies: I.C.M. Roma; Fénix Cooperativa Cinematográfica
- Distributed by: Fenix Cinematográfica (Spain)
- Release dates: 25 August 1959 (Turin); 17 April 1960 (Barcelona)
- Running time: 95 minutes
- Countries: Italy; Spain
- Language: Italian
- Box office: ITL 263.690 million

I ladri (lit. The Thieves) is a 1959 comedy film written and directed by Lucio Fulci and starring Totò and Giovanna Ralli.

== Plot ==
Gangster Joe Castagneto is declared undesirable by the U.S. government and returns to Naples where, under a special surveillance, he will have to deal with the hard-working and smart Police Commissioner Gennaro Di Sapio.

== Cast ==
- Totò as Police Commissioner Gennaro Di Sapio
- Armando Calvo as Joe Castagnato/Inspector Mac Millan
- Giovanna Ralli as Maddalena Scognamiglio, Vincenzo's wife
- Giacomo Furia as Vincenzo Scognamiglio
- Enzo Turco as Brigadier Lanocella
- Fred Buscaglione as himself
- Juan José Menéndez as Alberto
- Rafael Luis Calvo as Ciardella
- Maria Luisa Rolando as Concetta Improta
- Felix Fernandex as Dr. Ascione

== Development ==
I ladri was an Italian and Spanish co-production between I.C.M. Roma based in Rome and Fénix Cooperativa Cinematográfica bnased in Spain. Interiors were filmed at Incir-De Parolis Studios in Rome.

I ladri was Lucio Fulci's first film as a director.

== Release ==
I ladri was first released regionally in Italy. It received theatrical releases in Turin on August 25, Rome on September 6, and Bari on September 10, 1959.

It was released in Spain in as Contrabando en Nápoles in different cities: first in Barcelona on April 17, Madrid on December 12, 1960. It grossed a total of 263,690,000 Italian lire in Italy.

It received an Italian-language screening in Chicago on December 16, 1963 as Toto Commissario (I ladri).

== See also ==
- List of Italian films of 1959
- List of Spanish films of 1959
