= Poverty and Nobility =

1954 film

Poverty and Nobility (Miseria e nobiltà)
- Film poster
- Directed by: Mario Mattoli
- Written by: Ruggero Maccari; Mario Mattoli (dialogues)
- Story by: Eduardo Scarpetta (play)
- Produced by: Dino De Laurentiis; Carlo Ponti
- Starring: Totò; Enzo Turco; Sophia Loren; Carlo Croccolo
- Cinematography: Karl Struss; Luciano Trasatti
- Edited by: Renato Cinquini
- Music by: Pippo Barzizza
- Production company: Excelsa Film
- Distributed by: Minerva Film
- Release date: 8 April 1954
- Running time: 95 minutes
- Country: Italy
- Language: Italian

Poverty and Nobility (Italian: Miseria e nobiltà) is a 1954 Italian comedy film directed by Mario Mattoli starring Sophia Loren and Totò. The story is taken from the Eduardo Scarpetta's play of the same name.

It is considered a masterpiece of Italian popular cinema.

== Plot ==
Naples, second half of the 19th century: impoverished Felice Sciosciamocca tries to work as a scribe for illiterate people, while his friend Don Pasquale tries to make photographs for rich couples. Meanwhile, in the house where the two live, their wives start to fight because the apartment is mortgaged, and the women don't have money to pay the rent. Luckily, rich Count Eugenio, in love with the beautiful dancer Gemma, asks Pasquale and Felice to stage a farce for him. In fact, the father of Gemma - an enriched cook - wants to meet Eugenio's family, but he knows that his real father does not approve of his love affair with the dancer. So Eugenio transforms Don Felice Sciosciamocca into his uncle (the Prince of Casador) and Don Pasquale has to play the true father of Eugenio (Ottavio Favetti). The young count entrusts a false part to each of the members of the two families, except for the second wife of Felice, Concetta. Count Eugenio cannot find a role for her, and Concetta gets very angry. While Felice and Pasquale are arguing in the beautiful villa of Don Gaetano, Concetta bursts into the home and tries to compromise the plan organized by Eugenio. Don Felice manages to fix the situation and in the end all is resolved.

== Cast ==
- Totò as Felice Sciosciammocca
- Dolores Palumbo as Luisella
- Enzo Turco as Pasquale
- Valeria Moriconi as Pupella
- Franca Faldini as Nadia
- Liana Billi as Concetta
- Franco Sportelli as Vincenzo
- Gianni Cavalieri as Don Gaetano
- Sophia Loren as Gemma
- Carlo Croccolo as Luigino
- Giuseppe Porelli as Marquis Ottavio aka "Bebè"
- Enzo Petito as Don Gioacchino
