= Neapolitan Turk =

1953 film

Neapolitan Turk (Un turco napoletano)
- Film poster
- Directed by: Mario Mattoli
- Written by: Sandro Continenza; Italo De Tuddo; Ruggero Maccari; Mario Monicelli (from the play written by Eduardo Scarpetta)
- Produced by: Alfredo De Laurentiis
- Starring: Totò, Carlo Campanini
- Cinematography: Riccardo Pallottini; Karl Struss
- Edited by: Renato Cinquini; Roberto Cinquini
- Music by: Pippo Barzizza
- Release date: 1953
- Running time: 86 minutes
- Country: Italy
- Language: Italian

Neapolitan Turk (Italian: Un turco napoletano) is a 1953 Italian comedy film directed by Mario Mattoli and starring Totò.

== Plot ==
The film is based on a play by the famous Neapolitan writer Eduardo Scarpetta, father of Eduardo and Peppino De Filippo and Titina De Filippo The story is set in Naples and Sorrento in the second half of 1800. The thief Felice Sciosciammocca (the surname in Naples means "one who is always with her mouth open in astonishment"; Felice means "Happy") together with the bandit Faina ("Weasel") escapes from prison and meets with a Turkish eunuch that he should go to Sorrento for a job. Don Felice kidnaps him and steals his letter of recommendation to get into the house of a rich businessman, so that gains a bit of money for him and for his accomplice. The man who had called the Turkish is the rich grocer Don Pasquale, being jealous of his wife and young daughter, betrothed to Don Carluccio holding a dowry, is to host the Turk and immediately test some suspicion. In fact, the Turk rather than look like a eunuch protector proves to be a great womanizer and causes the sympathy of all the girls in the town and the wrath of the young. Don Felice, forgetting appears Faina, have fun in monitoring the wife and daughter of Pasquale and Don Carluccio appears more and more restless by the net waste of his betrothed. In the following days Don Felice will be met with the Honourable MP Cocchetelli who had recommended the real Turk to Don Pasquale, but cannot reveal the truth because Don Felice surprised him with a girl who was not his wife. On the day of the wedding, don Carluccio, after an engagement party gone wrong, stormed into the house of Don Pasquale to beat him, but Don Felice intervenes and gives the marching orders to the bully who runs away scared. All thank Don Felice, who reveals his identity and claims to have done all this misunderstanding and funny situations to entertain the audience watching him from a theater.

== Cast ==
- Totò as Felice Sciosciammocca
- Ignazio Balsamo as Luigi
- Isa Barzizza as Giulietta
- Primarosa Battistella as Lisetta
- Liana Billi as Giuliana
- Carlo Campanini as Don Pasquale
- Anna Campori as Concettella
- Mario Castellani as L'onorevole Cocchetelli
- Dino Curcio as Michele
- Christiane Dury as Marion
- Franca Faldini as Angelica
- Amedeo Girard as Ignazio
- Aldo Giuffrè as Faina
