= Toto and Peppino Divided in Berlin =

- Directed by: Giorgio Bianchi
- Written by: Age & Scarpelli; Sandro Continenza; Dino De Palma
- Produced by: Mario Mariani
- Starring: Totò; Peppino De Filippo
- Cinematography: Tino Santoni
- Edited by: Daniele Alabisio
- Music by: Armando Trovaioli
- Distributed by: Titanus
- Release date: 1962
- Running time: 95 min
- Country: Italy
- Language: Italian

Totò e Peppino divisi a Berlino, internationally released as Toto and Peppino Divided in Berlin, is a 1962 Italian comedy film directed by Giorgio Bianchi.

== Plot ==
Antonio leaves Italy for Berlin to reach Peppino, who works the miserable job of "magliaro". Since he is very poor, Antonio makes a pact with the daughter of former Nazi admiral Attila Canarinis, who is his perfect double, so that in West Berlin he will be tried by the Americans for war crimes. Antonio escapes from jail, but the troubles for him are not finished, because in East Berlin he is mistaken by the Russians for a secret agent, due to a misinterpretation of the Neapolitan book "La smorfia".

== Cast ==
- Totò: Antonio La Puzza / Aunt nun / Admiral Attila Canarinis
- Peppino De Filippo: Peppino Pagliuca
- Nadine Sanders: Greta Canarinis
- John Karlsen: the former attendant of Canarinis
- Luigi Pavese: the Russian General
- Robert Alda: the judge
- Renato Terra: the Russian lawyer
- Dante Maggio: magliaro
- Carlo Pisacane: magliaro
