= Toto vs. the Black Pirate =

Totò vs. the Black Pirate
- Directed by: Fernando Cerchio
- Written by: Nino Stresa; Francesco Luzi
- Starring: Totò
- Cinematography: Alvaro Mancori
- Music by: Carlo Rustichelli
- Release date: 1964
- Running time: 93 minutes
- Country: Italy
- Language: Italian

Totò vs. the Black Pirate (Italian: Totò contro il pirata nero) is a 1964 Italian adventure-comedy film written and directed by Fernando Cerchio.

== Plot ==
José is a Neapolitan petty thief who escaping from the guards for a small theft hides himself in a barrel of Jamaican rum of on the quay of the port of Naples. The barrel get placed, however, on a pirate ship, so the man will have to face a horde of pirates to save his life.

== Cast ==
- Totò as Josè
- Mario Petri as The Black Pirate
- Aldo Giuffrè as Lt. Burrasca
- Grazia Maria Spina as Isabella
- Mario Castellani as Uncino
- Pietro Carloni as The Governor
- Aldo Bufi Landi as Manolo
- Giacomo Furia as Don Carlos d'Aragona
- Franco Ressel as The Spanish Commander
