= Enzo Turco =

Italian actor

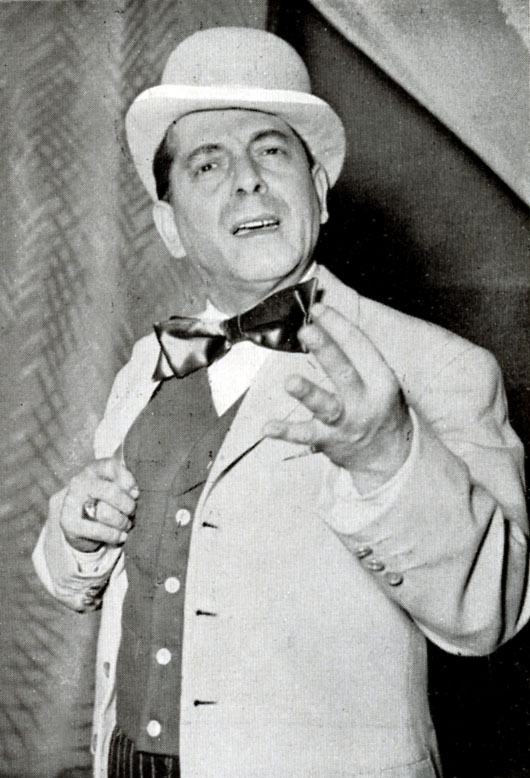
- Born: 1902; Naples, Italy
- Died: 7 July 1983 (aged 80–81); Rome, Italy
- Occupation: Actor
- Years active: 1939–1972

Enzo Turco (1902 – 7 July 1983) was an Italian film actor. He appeared in 39 films between 1939 and 1972. He was born in Naples, Italy and died in Rome, Italy.

== Selected filmography ==
- Departure at Seven (1946)
- Fear and Sand (1948)
- Baron Carlo Mazza (1948)
- The Steamship Owner (1951)
- Toto Seeks Peace (1954)
- Poverty and Nobility (1954)
- Milanese in Naples (1954)
- The Thieves (1959)
