= Aldo Giuffrè =

Italian actor (1924–2010)

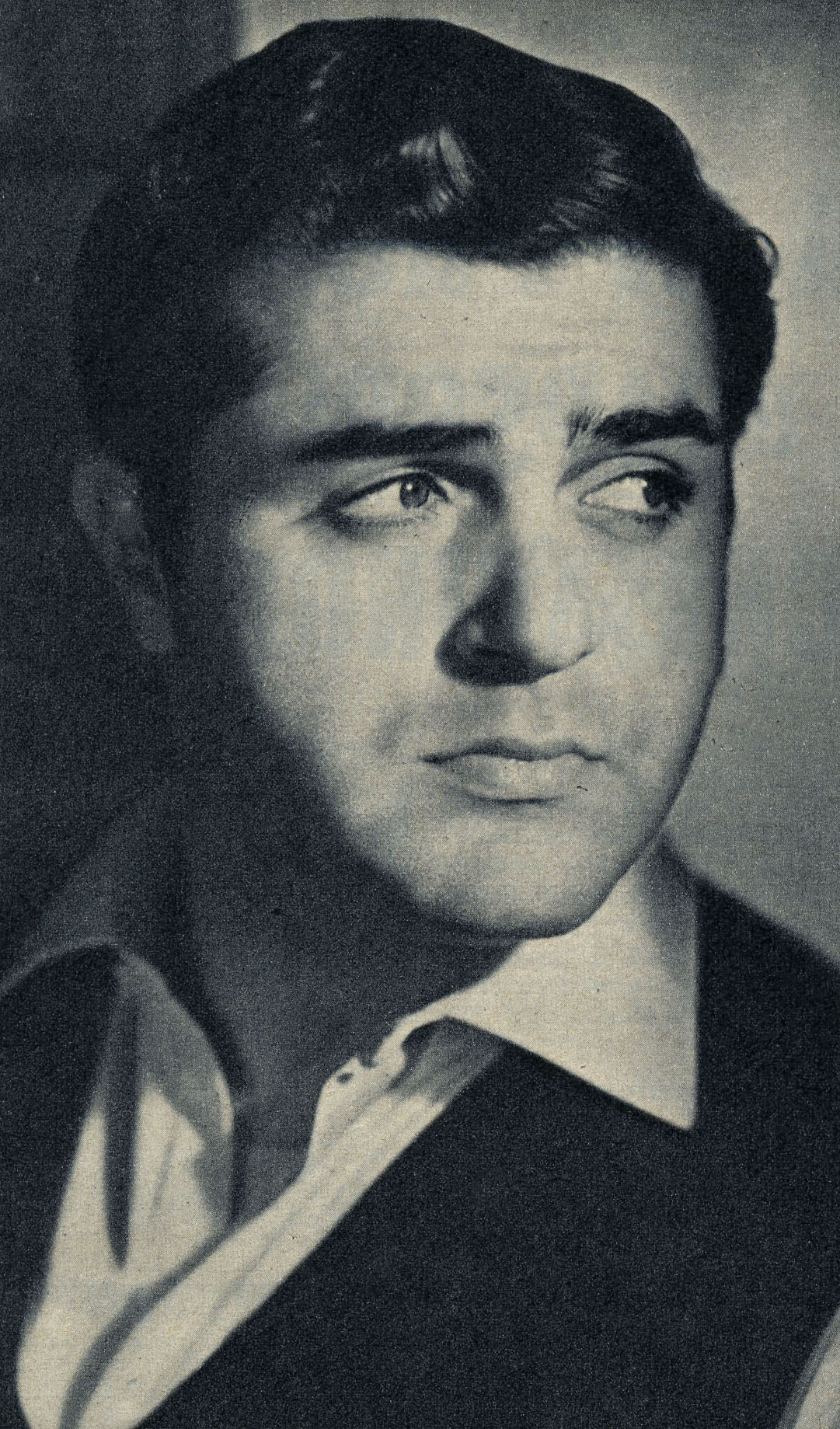
- Giuffrè in 1958
- Born: 10 April 1924; Naples, Kingdom of Italy
- Died: 26 June 2010 (aged 86); Rome, Italy
- Occupations: Actor; comedian
- Years active: 1945–2003
- Height: 1.78 m (5 ft 10 in)
- Relatives: Carlo Giuffrè (brother)

Aldo Giuffrè (Italian pronunciation: [ˈaldo dʒufˈfrɛ]; 10 April 1924 – 26 June 2010) was an Italian film actor and comedian who appeared in over 90 films between 1948 and 2001. He was the brother of actor Carlo Giuffrè.

He is known for his roles in The Four Days of Naples, and as the alcoholic Captain Clinton of the Union Army in the Sergio Leone film The Good, the Bad and the Ugly in 1966.

Giuffrè died in Rome in 2010 of peritonitis. He is buried at Cimitero Flaminio in Rome.

== Selected filmography ==
- Assunta Spina (1948) – Don Marcusio, la guardia
- The Emperor of Capri (1949) – Omar Bey Kahn di Agapur
- Side Street Story (1950) – Federico
- The Cadets of Gascony (1950) – Un caporale
- Totò Tarzan (1950) – Un paracadutista
- A Dog's Life (1950) – Il barista (uncredited)
- Toto the Sheik (1950) – Altro legionario
- Toto the Third Man (1951) – L'avvocato del sindaco
- Filumena Marturano (1951) – Luigi
- The Steamship Owner (1951) – Nicola
- Cops and Robbers (1951) – Amilcare
- The Machine to Kill Bad People (1952)
- Five Paupers in an Automobile (1952) – Padella
- La figlia del diavolo (1952) – Carceriere
- Neapolitan Turk (1953) – Faina
- Captain Phantom (1953)
- I Always Loved You (1953) – Felice
- It Happened in the Park (1953) – Il vigile Attilio Scardaci (segment: Incidente a Villa Borghese)
- Neapolitan Carousel (1954)
- The Doctor of the Mad (1954) – Ciccillo
- Le signorine dello 04 (1955) – Guido Colasanti
- Toto in Hell (1955) – Minosse
- Roman Tales (1955) – The Flirting Lawyer at the Park (uncredited)
- I giorni più belli (1955)
- Peccato di castità (1956)
- Malafemmena (1957) – Carmine Cammarano
- Rascel marine (1958) – Marine
- Lui, lei e il nonno (1959) – Mimmo
- The Magliari (1959) – Armando
- Juke box urli d'amore (1959) – Bruno
- I piaceri del sabato notte (1960) – Ernesto
- Il carabiniere a cavallo (1961) – Il tenente istruttore
- Black City (1961) – Il brigadiere Crisquolo
- The Best of Enemies (1961) – Sergeant Todini
- Accroche-toi, y'a du vent! (1961) – Manone
- Those Two in the Legion (1962) – Sadrim
- The Four Days of Naples (1962) – Pitrella (uncredited)
- The Shortest Day (1963) – Uno degli eredi siciliani (uncredited)
- Hercules, Samson and Ulysses (1963) – Saran of Gaza
- Yesterday, Today and Tomorrow (1963) – Pasquale Nardella (segment "Adelina")
- I Cuori infranti (1963) – Carlo De Tomasi (segment "La manina di Fatma")
- Toto vs. the Black Pirate (1964) – Tenente Burrasca
- I marziani hanno 12 mani (1964) – Il protettore di prostitute
- Two Mafiamen in the Far West (1964) – Avvocato difesa
- Love and Marriage (1964) – (segment "Ultima carta, L'")
- La maschera e il volto (1965, TV) – Paolo Grazia
- Letti sbagliati (1965) – Carlo De Rossi (segment "Il complicato")
- Latin Lovers (1965) – Arminio (segment "Il telefono consolatore")
- Made in Italy (1965) – Vincenzino (segment "1 'Usi e costumi', episode 2")
- Spiaggia libera (1966) – Cuccurallo – il carabiniere
- Les Combinards (1966) – Vincenzo del Giudice – un giornalista
- The Good, the Bad and the Ugly (1966) – Alcoholic Union Captain
- No Diamonds for Ursula (1967) – Marcos
- Ghosts – Italian Style (1967) – Raffaele
- The Most Beautiful Couple in the World (1968) – Turiddu
- Diary of a Telephone Operator (1969) – Vedovo del Barbiere
- Check to the Queen (1969) – Spartaco
- Con quale amore, con quanto amore (1970) – Giovanni
- Cerca di capirmi (1970)
- When Women Had Tails (1970) – Zog
- When Men Carried Clubs and Women Played Ding-Dong (1971) – Gott
- No desearás la mujer del vecino (1971) – Mariano
- Hector the Mighty (1972) – Agamenonne
- The Sicilian Checkmate (1972) – Giuseppe Salemi
- The Heroes (1973) – Spartaco Amore
- My Pleasure Is Your Pleasure (1973) – Grand Duke
- Il brigadiere Pasquale Zagaria ama la mamma e la polizia (1973) – Zoppas
- Furto di sera bel colpo si spera (1973)
- Pasqualino Cammarata, Frigate Captain (1974) – Pasqualino Cammarata
- Silence the Witness (1974) – Il commissario Santi
- Sesso in testa (1974) – Frank Innamorato
- Prostituzione (1974) – Inspector Macaluso
- Loaded Guns (1975) – Don Calò
- The Flower in His Mouth (1975) – Maresciallo
- Chi dice donna dice donna (1976) – Il commissario (segment "La signorina X")
- L'adolescente (1976) – Maresciallo dei carabinieri
- La prima notte di nozze (1976)
- Oh Serafina (1976) – Professor Osvaldo Caroniti
- Tre sotto il lenzuolo (1979) – Il cardinale (segment "L'omaggio")
- Ciao marziano (1980) – Dott. Ponzio
- Zappatore (1980) – Maresciallo Barbato
- Per favore, occupati di Amelia (1981) – Il prete
- Carcerato (1981) – Don Peppino Ascalone
- Where's Picone? (1984) – Cocò
- L'ultima scena (1988) – Peppino Patito
- Mortacci (1989) – Impresario pompe funebri
- Street Kids (1989) – Don Nicola
- La repubblica di San Gennaro (2003) – Il professore
