= Fiorella Mari =

Italian actress (1928–1983)

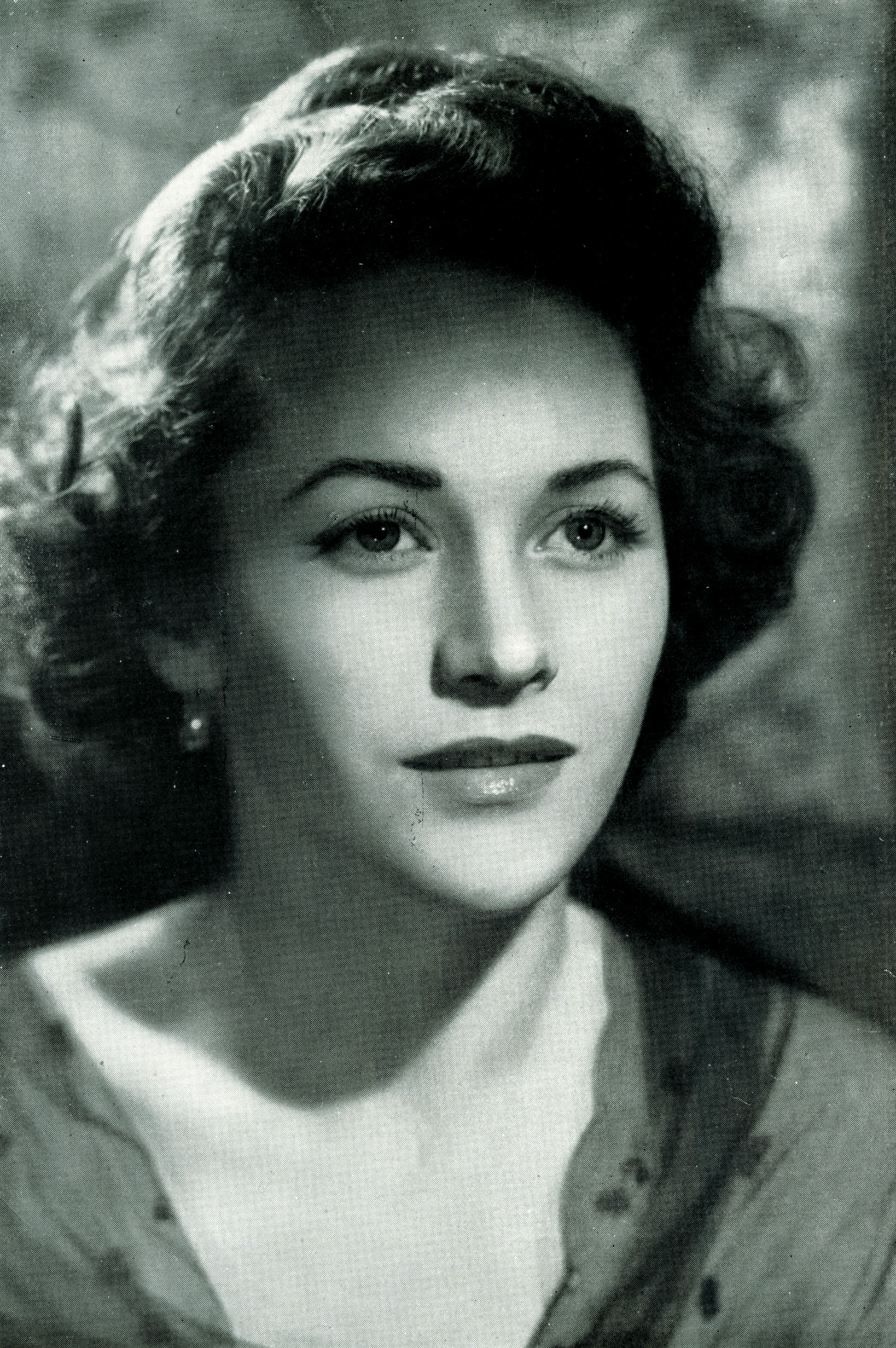
- Mari in 1954
- Born: Fiorella Colpi; 21 June 1928; São Paulo, Brazil
- Died: 2 March 1983 (aged 54); Rome, Italy
- Occupation: Actress

Fiorella Colpi (21 June 1928 – 2 March 1983), known professionally as Fiorella Mari, was a Brazilian-born Italian actress.

== Life and career ==
Fiorella Colpi was born in São Paulo, Brazil, to Italian parents. The daughter of a surgeon, Colpi soon moved to Rome where in the 1950s she made her acting debut using the surname of her American husband of the time (Jess Maxwell, from whom she divorced shortly after). She later adopted the stage name Mari and appeared in a number of stage plays, radio programs, television films and films. She is probably best known for her roles in Camillo Mastrocinque's Are We Men or Corporals? (1955) and in Mario Monicelli's Fathers and Sons (1957). In 1957 Mari hosted the 7th edition of the Sanremo Music Festival alongside Nunzio Filogamo and Marisa Allasio; a short time later she retired from showbusiness.

Mari died in Rome on 2 March 1983, at the age of 54.

== Selected filmography ==
- Queen Margot (1954)
- The Day the Sky Exploded (1958) as Mary McLaren
