= Funniest Show on Earth =

1953 film

Funniest Show on Earth (Il più comico spettacolo del mondo)
- Film poster
- Directed by: Mario Mattoli
- Written by: Sandro Continenza; Italo De Tuddo; Ruggero Maccari; Mario Monicelli
- Produced by: Alfredo De Laurentiis
- Starring: May Britt; Totò; Peppino De Filippo
- Cinematography: Riccardo Pallottini
- Edited by: Leo Cattozzo
- Music by: Armando Trovaioli
- Distributed by: Lux Film
- Release date: 1953
- Running time: 70 minutes
- Country: Italy
- Language: Italian

Funniest Show on Earth (Italian: Il più comico spettacolo del mondo) is a 1953 Italian comedy film directed by Mario Mattoli and starring May Britt. It is the first Italian film in 3D.

It was filmed with a three-dimensional shooting system patented by Carlo Ponti and Dino De Laurentiis and called "PoDelVision" (from the initials of their surnames), which prescribed the simultaneous use of more cameras and then the printing of two identical copies of films: one for the left eye and one for the right eye.

The film is an explicit parody of Cecil B. DeMille's The Greatest Show on Earth.

== Plot ==
In the circus a clown named Tottons Togni (Totò), forced to never remove his make-up to avoid revealing his real identity, is constantly haunted by the jealousy of three women (a lion tamer, a fantasist, a trapeze artist) and also by the investigations of a police officer.

== Cast ==
- Totò as Tottons, il clown / Una signora del pubblico
- May Britt as Brigitte, la domatrice
- Mario Castellani as Il domatore
- Peppino De Filippo as Uno spettatore
- Bianca Maria Fabbri
- Franca Faldini as Yvonne, la soubrette
- Enzo Garinei as Altro presentatore
- Fanny Landini
- Marc Lawrence as Il proprietario del circo
- Salvo Libassi
- Alberto Sorrentino as Bastian
- Anthony Quinn as Spettatore
- Silvana Mangano as Spettatrice
