= Rosita Pisano =

Italian actress (1919–1975)

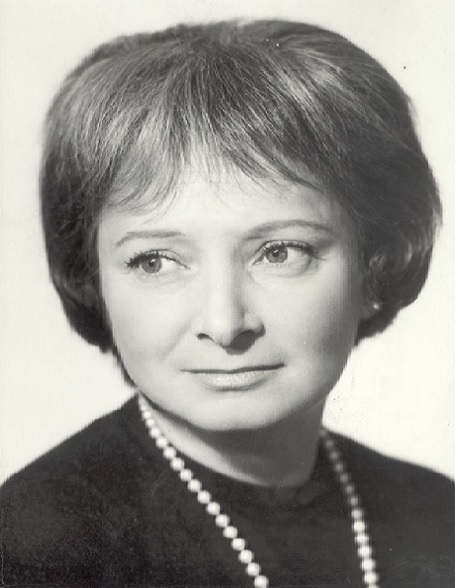
- Born: 15 October 1919; Naples, Kingdom of Italy
- Died: 24 December 1975 (aged 56); Rome, Italy
- Occupation: Actress

Rosa Pisano (15 October 1919 – 24 December 1975) was an Italian stage, film and television actress.

== Life and career ==
Pisano was born in Naples, into a family of dialect theatre actors. She debuted on stage as a child actress in her family company, and later entered the stage company of Eduardo and Peppino De Filippo. After the war and after the dissolution of the company she continued working with Eduardo De Filippo, and starting from the 1950s with other companies, notably the one held by Nino Taranto. Pisano was also active in films and on television, even if mainly cast in supporting roles.

== Partial filmography ==
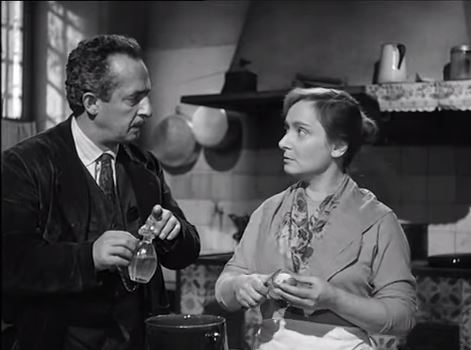
Nino Taranto and Rosita Pisano in Arrivano i dollari! (1957)

- Non ti pago! (1942) - Una giocatrice al lotto
- Assunta Spina (1948) - Una lavorante all stireria (uncredited)
- Side Street Story (1950) - Assunta
- Filumena Marturano (1951) - Lucia
- Anna (1951) - Suor Carmela
- Toto in Color (1952)
- Deceit (1952) - La signora litigiosa
- Non è vero... ma ci credo (1952) - Concetta
- The Country of the Campanelli (1954) - Annie
- Tarantella napoletana (1954) - Troupe Member
- The Doctor of the Mad (1954)
- Prima di sera (1954) - Francesca - Bancanis' servant
- Toto and Carolina (1955) - Sig.ra Barozzoli (uncredited)
- Are We Men or Corporals? (1955)
- The Two Friends (1955) - Moglie di Vincenzo
- Folgore Division (1955) - Post Office Worker
- I giorni più belli (1956) - Angelina - La bidella
- Ci sposeremo a Capri (1956) - Rosetta
- Arrivano i dollari! (1957) - Rosina (uncredited)
- Il marito (1957) - Sofia
- I prepotenti (1958) - Zia Rosa
- La sfida (1958) - (uncredited)
- Tuppe tuppe, Marescià! (1958) - A Village Woman (uncredited)
- Ricordati di Napoli (1958) - Concettina
- La nipote Sabella (1959)
- Il vedovo (1959) - Nardi's employee
- Avventura in città (1959)
- The Traffic Policeman (1960) - Lisa (uncredited)
- Black City (1961) - Donna Amalia
- Pesci d'oro e bikini d'argento (1961)
- Always on Sunday (1962) - Anita
- Of Wayward Love (1962)
- Le motorizzate (1963) - (uncredited)
- In ginocchio da te (1964) - Dolores
- Our Husbands (1966) - Rosetta (segment "Il marito di Roberta")
- Mi vedrai tornare (1966)
- Io non protesto, io amo (1967) - Anna Maria
- I due vigili (1967) - Cesira
- I 2 pompieri (1968) - Caramella's Mother
- Pensando a te (1969)
- Lisa dagli occhi blu (1970) - School caretaker
- La Sciantosa (1970) - Lady President at the Duel
- Nel giorno del signore (1970)
- La ragazza del prete (1970)
- Venga a fare il soldato da noi (1971) - Palmira
- Boccaccio (1972) - Mannocchia
- When Women Were Called Virgins (1972) - Berta
- La mano nera (1973)
- Little Funny Guy (1973)
- Piedino il questurino (1974) - Nunziatina
- Libera, My Love (1975) - Matteo's Sister (final film role)
