= La Sciantosa =

1970 television film directed by Alfredo Giannetti

La Sciantosa is an Italian TV movie directed by Alfredo Giannetti and produced by RAI television in 1970. Even though it was filmed in color, back then RAI's shows were still being shown in black and white, since they didn't convert to color TV until 1977.

== Plot ==
Flora is a faded sciantosa (i.e. variety show diva), played by Anna Magnani, whose career has declined. When she receives an invitation to sing at an army base, she thinks she's singing to the front line soldiers, so she accepts the invitation. She and her assistant, Cristina, played by Rosita Pisano, are met at the train station by Tonino, a young soldier, played by Massimo Ranieri. He then drives the ladies to the army base, and then introduces them to his misfit band of musicians, including a very annoying horn player, who almost causes Flora not to want to sing for the soldiers, and a guitar player, who ruins a march song by blowing a kazoo at the end. Flora's set to take the stage, draped in an Italian flag and wearing a crown. But when the curtain opens, and she sees the severity of some of the soldiers' injuries, she gets instant stage fright. After two unsuccessful tries to get her to do the march song, Tonino tells the band to play "'O surdato 'nnammurato", which Anna Magnani herself beautifully sings. At that point, she has an epiphany and breaks down. After the performance, the base being under attack, Tonino helps Flora out of the building. Unfortunately, she and Cristina get separated, and towards the end of the movie, Flora realizes how much she mistreated Cristina, and decides to sacrifice herself by shielding Tonino from an enemy plane firing at his car.
