= Renato Cinquini =

Italian film editor

- Occupation: Film editor
- Years active: 1950–1977

Renato Cinquini was an Italian film editor. He worked on more than a hundred films during his career.

== Selected filmography ==
- Figaro Here, Figaro There (1950)
- Son of d'Artagnan (1950)
- Toto Looks for a Wife (1950)
- Brief Rapture (1951)
- The Dream of Zorro (1952)
- The Unfaithfuls (1953)
- Neapolitan Turk (1953)
- Two Nights with Cleopatra (1954)
- Poverty and Nobility (1954)
- A Woman Alone (1956)
- The Mighty Crusaders (1958)
- The Loves of Hercules (1960)
- Totò, Peppino e... la dolce vita (1961)
- Queen of the Nile (1961)
- Thor and the Amazon Women (1963)
- The Fall of Rome (1963)
- The Whip and the Body (1963)
- The Sign of the Coyote (1963)
- Three Nights of Love (1964)
- Nightmare Castle (1965)
- A Bullet for the General (1966)
- Argoman the Fantastic Superman (1967)
- The Belle Starr Story (1968)
- The Vampire and the Ballerina (1968)
- Hell in Normandy (1968)
- The Ruthless Four (1968)
- Day After Tomorrow (1968)
- Shoot Twice (1969)
- 1870 (1971)
- Eye in the Labyrinth (1972)
- Il domestico (1974)
- Sex Pot (1975)
- Bloody Payroll (1976)
- La malavita attacca... la polizia risponde! (1977)
- Pane, burro e marmellata (1977)

== Bibliography ==
- Roberto Curti. Italian Gothic Horror Films, 1957-1969. McFarland, 2015.
