= Gilda Mignonette =

Italian singer (1886–1953)

Griselda Andreatini, better known by the stage name Gilda Mignonette (28 October 1886 in Naples – 8 June 1953), was a Neapolitan singer of international fame in the early 20th century.

She began her career as a singer in theatrical revue shows, where she became a popular "sciantosa" (i.e., a diva), but later dedicated herself mostly to the canzone napoletana genre, recording with major labels such as Columbia and His Master's Voice, and touring intensively abroad.

In the mid-1920s, she moved to New York, where she reached the apex of her international popularity with Neapolitan classics such as A cartulina 'e Napule ("Postcard from Naples") or E l'emigrante chiagne ("And the emigrant cries").

In June 1926 she married Feliciano "Frank" Acierno Jr., son of Feliciano Acierno, owner and operator of Acierno's Thalia Theater, previously known as the famed Bowery Theater. Acierno is credited for bringing much of the Italian vaudeville scene to New York City. The Acierno Theater was known for churning out nightly entertainment, featuring an eclectic mix of experimental theater alongside traditional Italian opera while also providing a packed house for some of Italy's most renowned performance artists to attain transatlantic appeal. While already a considerable star in Italy, her father-in-law's theater provided Griselda Andreatini Acierno (performing as Gilda Mignonette) the venue to catapult to stardom in the United States.

In "Birds of Passage" Italian author and sound-studies scholar Simona Frasca writes extensively about Andreatini as Gilda Mignonette, citing her as central to the narrative of early 20th century Italian-American music and culture.

In the early 1950s, she suffered severe health problems; having expressed the desire to die in her hometown in Naples, she actually died during the traversal by boat, off the Algerian coast.
