= Man, Beast and Virtue =

1953 film by Steno

- Directed by: Steno
- Written by: Lucio Fulci; Vitaliano Brancati; Steno; Jean Josipovici
- Based on: Man, Beast and Virtue by Luigi Pirandello
- Produced by: Dino De Laurentiis; Luigi De Laurentiis; Carlo Ponti; Antonio Altaviti
- Starring: Totò; Orson Welles; Viviane Romance
- Cinematography: Mario Damicelli
- Edited by: Gisa Radicchi Levi
- Music by: Angelo Francesco Lavagnino; P.G. Redi
- Distributed by: Lux Film
- Release date: 9 May 1953
- Running time: 90 min
- Country: Italy
- Language: Italian

L'uomo, la bestia e la virtù (Italian pronunciation: [ˈlwɔːmo la ˈbestja e la virˈtu]), internationally released as Man, Beast and Virtue, is a 1953 Italian comedy film directed by Steno. It starred Italian comedian Totò and famed actor Orson Welles.

== Plot ==
Paolino (Totò) is in love with a married woman, Assunta (Viviane Romance). Both participate in a casual affair, but one day Assunta becomes pregnant. The woman's husband, Captain Perella (Orson Welles), suddenly returns after months away from home for work. In order to avoid the shame and disgrace of discovery, Paolino hatches a complex plot to ensure that Perella spends a night of pleasure with Assunta to disguise the origin of her pregnancy. Little do they know the Captain is recovering from a series of trysts with multiple mistresses while on his sea voyage. Paolino dresses Assunta in sexy attire to pique her husband's interest and even tries to get him to eat some cake laced with stimulants.

== Cast ==
- Totò as Paolino De Vico
- Orson Welles as Captain Perella
- Viviane Romance as Assunta Perella
- Franca Faldini as Mariannina
- Mario Castellani as The doctor
- Clelia Matania as Grazia
- Giancarlo Nicotra as Nonò
- Rocco D'Assunta as Zeppo
- Italia Marchesini as Rosaria
- Carlo Delle Piane as the student
- Salvo Libassi as the helmsman

== Production ==
Sergio Leone and Lucio Fulci were both assistant directors on this film. Fulci said the film did not really do well, but it gave Fulci his first screenwriting credit, and he really enjoyed being in Orson Welles' presence. Welles was in Italy filming Othello at the time, and Fulci said Welles' entire diet consisted of oranges which he ate in massive quantities. Fulci described Totò as being a very sad figure, and said Carlo Ponti forced him to star in this film against his will as Totò had signed a contract with the producer. According to Fulci, Welles, that at the time was going through financial difficulties, often tried to prolong filming in order to collect overtime pay, and for this reason he would deliberately flub his lines and remove his makeup. After Ponti declined to pay overtime, Welles suddenly left Rome, and the production had to complete the remaining scenes with a body double.

The film was originally shot in Gevacolor, but only black-and-white prints exist today. The film was based on the 1919 novel and play of the same name by Luigi Pirandello. Pirandello's heirs were very disappointed with the film, which they said omitted most of the bawdy humor and the theme of dressing the actors up in animal costumes was jettisoned by the producers, leaving behind an emasculated version of Pirandello's play. The film vanished from sight for decades following its brief theatrical release, a black-and-white print only surfacing in the early 1990s, making it impossible to evaluate Mario Damicelli's much vaunted color cinematography.
