= Where Is Freedom? =

Where Is Freedom? (Dov'è la libertà?)
- Directed by: Roberto Rossellini
- Written by: Vitaliano Brancati; Ennio Flaiano; Antonio Pietrangeli; Vincenzo Talarico
- Produced by: Carlo Ponti; Dino De Laurentiis
- Starring: Totò
- Cinematography: Aldo Tonti; Tonino Delli Colli
- Music by: Renzo Rossellini
- Release date: 1954
- Running time: 84 min
- Country: Italy
- Language: Italian

Where Is Freedom? (Italian: Dov'è la libertà?) is a 1954 Italian comedy-drama film directed by Roberto Rossellini.

The film had a troubled production because, after shooting some scenes, Rossellini lost interest in the film and abandoned the set. The work was completed after about a year, mainly from Mario Monicelli, with some scenes also shot by Lucio Fulci and Federico Fellini. Despite that, Rossellini is the sole credited director of the film.

== Plot ==
Difficulties and troubles of an ex-convict. Embittered and disillusioned by life, he will soon plan his return to prison.

== Cast ==
- Totò: Salvatore Lo Jacono
- Vera Molnar: Agnesina
- Nita Dover: marathon dancer
- Franca Faldini: Maria
- Leopoldo Trieste: Abramo Piperno
- Antonio Nicotra: marshal #1
- Salvo Libassi: marshal #2
- Giacomo Rondinella: prisoner
- Ugo D'Alessio: judge
- Mario Castellani: public prosecutor
- Vincenzo Talarico: defense attorney
- Pietro Carloni: Pietro
