= The Doctor of the Mad =

1954 film

- Film poster
- Directed by: Mario Mattoli
- Written by: Ruggero Maccari; Mario Mattoli; Totò; Eduardo Scarpetta; Vincenzo Talarico (from a play written by Eduardo Scarpetta)
- Produced by: Alfredo De Laurentiis; Carlo Ponti
- Starring: Totò
- Cinematography: Riccardo Pallottini
- Music by: Pippo Barzizza
- Production company: Ponti
- Distributed by: Variety Film
- Release date: 13 September 1954
- Running time: 91 minutes
- Country: Italy
- Language: Italian

The Doctor of the Mad (Italian: Il medico dei pazzi) is a 1954 Italian comedy film directed by Mario Mattoli and starring Totò, Franca Marzi and Aldo Giuffrè. It is based on a 1908 Naples-set play of the same name by Eduardo Scarpetta.

== Plot summary ==
Felice Sciosciammocca is the mayor of Roccasecca, who sent in Naples the nephew Ciccillo, so that he will become a good doctor. But Ciccillo does anything but study, and makes a debt with a loan shark. Also receives a letter that his uncle is going to come to Naples with his family to find him. Ciccillo, who lives in the "Stella Hotel", a full house of "eccentric" people, pretends that Felice believes that the pension is the clinic, and the customers the fools. Felice Sciosciammocca admires everything, but Ciccillo, to heal his debt, must move away. So Felice is left alone in the guest house, doesn't know how to get himself out of trouble...

== Cast ==
- Totò as Felice Sciosciammocca
- Franca Marzi as La moglie di Cristaldi
- Aldo Giuffrè as Ciccillo
- Vittoria Crispo as Amalia
- Carlo Ninchi as L'attore
- Tecla Scarano as La moglie di Felice
- Nerio Bernardi as Il colonello
- Giacomo Furia as Michele
- Nora Ricci as La figlia di Amalia
- Anna Campori as Una signora
- Mario Castellani as Cristaldi
- Amedeo Girardi
- Ugo D'Alessio
- Rosita Pisano
- Pupella Maggio
- Enzo Garinei
- Maria Pia Casilio as Margherita

== Bibliography ==
- Ennio Bìspuri. Totò: principe clown : tutti i film di Totò. Guida Editori, 1997.
