= Sciantosa =

In Italian theatrical culture, the term sciantosa (pronounced [ʃanˈtoːza; -oːsa]; pl. sciantose) refers to a stock character that developed from the late 19th century through the early 20th century in such popular genres such as café-concert, variety show, avanspettacolo, and revue. The term is a distortion of the French word chanteuse (feminine form of "singer"), and was originally used for female singers that performed opera or operetta arias in café-chantant venues. As such, the "sciantosa" was a sort of scaled-down version of the opera "diva". Later on, the term acquired further implications, most notably that of femme fatale. Popular sciantose often had (or pretended to have) mysterious and exotic traits, such as a foreign accent, a turbulent past, or romantic affairs with lovers from the jet set. To emphasize their reputation of divas, prominent sciantose hired a claque to follow their shows.

Some of the most well known sciantose were Anna Fougez, Gilda Mignonette, Olimpia d'Avigny, and Yvonne de Fleuriel.

With the advent of cinema and television, many forms of popular theatrical shows faded, and so did the "sciantosa" archetype, whose traits were partially transferred to new roles such as the soubrette or the showgirl.

The 1971 film La Sciantosa, by director Alfredo Giannetti, portrays a typical sciantosa (played by Anna Magnani).
