= Il coraggio =

- Directed by: Domenico Paolella
- Written by: Augusto Novelli; Totò; Marcello Ciorciolini; Marcello Marchesi; Edoardo Anton
- Produced by: Dino De Laurentiis; Carlo Ponti
- Starring: Totò; Gino Cervi
- Cinematography: Leonida Barboni
- Edited by: Gisa Radicchi Levi
- Music by: Carlo Savina
- Distributed by: Lux Film
- Release date: 1955
- Running time: 95 min
- Country: Italy
- Language: Italian

Il coraggio ('The Courage') is a 1955 Italian comedy film directed by Domenico Paolella.

== Plot ==
Commendatore Aristide Paoloni is an honest, forthright and brave man, who prides himself on saving lives. His specialty is to avoid drowning suicides that are thrown into the Tiber from the Milvian Bridge in Rome, and so one day Aristide saves the poor Gennaro. Gennaro, realizing the situation, pretends to Aristide Paoloni a job, but the man ignores him. So, Gennaro begins to disturb the quiet family life of the Commendatore, who soon begins to look for a way to kill the poor Gennaro.

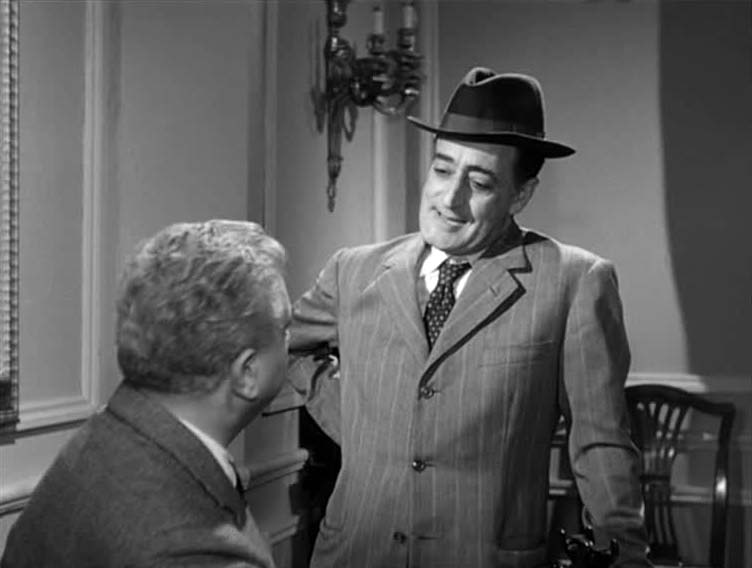
Gino Cervi and Totò in Il coraggio (1955)

== Cast ==
- Totò as Gennaro Vaccariello/Janeiro Vaccarillos
- Gino Cervi as Comm. Aristide Paoloni
- Gianna Maria Canale as Susy Esposito
- Irène Galter as Irene
- Gabriele Tinti as Raffaele
- Paola Barbara as Anna
- Leopoldo Trieste as amministratore Rialti
- Ernesto Almirante as Salvatore
- Anna Campori as Ginevra
