= Toto in Hell =

- Directed by: Camillo Mastrocinque
- Written by: Vittorio Metz; Lucio Fulci; Francesco Nelli; Mario Mangini; Italo Di Tuddo; Totò; Camillo Mastrocinque
- Starring: Totò
- Cinematography: Aldo Tonti
- Music by: Pippo Barzizza
- Release date: 1955
- Running time: 88 min
- Country: Italy
- Language: Italian

Toto in Hell (Italian: Totò all'inferno) is a 1955 Italian fantasy-comedy film directed by Camillo Mastrocinque. Italian cult horror film director Lucio Fulci co-wrote the screenplay.

== Plot ==
Antonio Marchi, a depressed thief, after several attempts of suicide, accidentally drowns in a river and ends up in hell. Here he is recognized as a reincarnation of Mark Antony and instead of ending the group of Violents is thrown by Belfegor to Cleopatra's arms, in the Lussuriosi group. But the meeting between the two is frowned upon by Satan, who is jealous of the woman, so, Totò, to escape his anger, escapes back to Earth.

== Cast ==
- Totò as Antonio Marchi
- Maria Frau as Cleopatra
- Olga Solbelli as Cleopatra's mother
- Tino Buazzelli as Devil-secretary
- Nerio Bernardi as Satana
- Dante Maggio as Pacifico
- Mario Castellani as Cri cri / Jealous husband
- Fulvia Franco as Dirimpettaia
- Franca Faldini as Maria
- Galeazzo Benti as Club Singer
- Giulio Calì as Charon
- Vincent Barbi as Al Capone
- Mario Pisu as Ptolemy
- Pietro Tordi as The fool
- Guglielmo Inglese as Cavaliere Scardacchione
- Ignazio Balsamo as Infermiere
- Aldo Giuffrè as Minosse
