= Toto Seeks Peace =

1954 film

- Film poster
- Directed by: Mario Mattoli
- Written by: Emilio Caglieri; Ruggero Maccari; Mario Mattoli; Vincenzo Talarico
- Produced by: Alfredo De Laurentiis
- Starring: Totò
- Cinematography: Riccardo Pallottini
- Edited by: Leo Cattozzo
- Music by: Carlo Savina
- Production company: Rosa Film
- Distributed by: Titanus
- Release date: 17 December 1954
- Running time: 90 minutes
- Country: Italy
- Language: Italian

Toto Seeks Peace (Italian: Totò cerca pace) is a 1954 Italian comedy film directed by Mario Mattoli and starring Totò.

== Plot ==
Two widowers decide to get married but their decision is continually hampered by their grandchildren, who are just interested in their inheritance.

== Cast ==
- Totò as Gennaro Piselli
- Ave Ninchi as Gemma Torresi Piselli
- Enzo Turco as Pasquale
- Paolo Ferrari as the clerk
- Isa Barzizza as Nella Caporali
- Giovanni Nannini as Celestino
- Nino Vingelli as the waiter
- Vincenzo Talarico as the lawyer
- Gina Amendola as Adele
- Ughetto Bertucci as a witness
- Mario Castellani as a witness

== Bibliography ==
- Aprà, Adriano. The Fabulous Thirties: Italian cinema 1929-1944. Electa International, 1979.
