= Toto and the Women =

Toto and the Women (Totò e le donne)
- Directed by: Mario Monicelli; Steno
- Written by: Age & Scarpelli; Mario Monicelli; Steno
- Produced by: Luigi De Laurentiis
- Starring: Totò; Lea Padovani
- Cinematography: Tonino Delli Colli
- Edited by: Gisa Radicchi Levi
- Music by: Carlo Rustichelli
- Release date: 1952
- Running time: 103 minutes
- Country: Italy
- Language: Italian

Toto and the Women (Italian: Totò e le donne) is a 1952 Italian comedy film directed by Mario Monicelli and Steno.

== Plot ==
The cloth retailer Philip is no longer able to stand his possessive and tyrannical wife who claims a higher lifestyle. In fact, for years now after the wedding, Philip was totally deprived of his freedom as a husband. The only freedom left is to hole up in the attic reading police novels and venerating an altar dedicated to the infamous serial killer Landru. The balance family collapses as the younger daughter of Philip became engaged to a young doctor: to prove to everyone her talent in giving injections, she decides, along with her mother, to use the poor Philip as a guinea pig. When enough is enough, Philip decides live the high life together with his young lover. However Philip soon realizes that the girl is too young for him and, avoiding ridiculousness, breaks off the relationship. At home, things get worse: his wife is complaining about the low wage and tells him about the poor quality of what she has been cooking for years and how she was forced to pawn her gold jewelry. Anyway, the marriage of the couple's daughter is the chance to find new finance and strength and the pair get back together. The easy moral is that women are hard to manage but unmissable as well.

== Cast ==
- Totò as Filippo Scaparro
- Lea Padovani as Ginetta
- Franca Faldini as La signora dell'appuntamento
- Ave Ninchi as Giovanna Scaparro
- Giovanna Pala as Mirella Scaparro
- Clelia Matania as La cameriera
- Alda Mangini as La signora nel negozio
- Primarosa Battistella as Antonietta
- Teresa Pellati as Irene
- Mario Castellani as Rag. Carlini
- Peppino De Filippo as Il dottor Desideri
- Pina Gallini as La suocera
- Carlo Mazzarella as Il presentatore del concorso di bellezza
