= Agenore Incrocci =

Italian screenwriter (1919–2005)

- Born: 4 July 1919; Brescia, Kingdom of Italy
- Died: 15 November 2005 (aged 86); Rome, Italy
- Other name: Age
- Occupation: Screenwriter
- Years active: 1949–2005
- Relatives: Zoe Incrocci (sister); Giorgia Meloni (grand-niece)

Agenore Incrocci (4 July 1919 – 15 November 2005), best known as Age, was an Italian screenwriter, considered one of the fathers of the commedia all'italiana as one of the two members of the duo Age & Scarpelli, together with Furio Scarpelli.

== Early life ==
Incrocci was born in Brescia, into a family including several actors, such as his sister Zoe, and spent his youth moving with them to numerous places of Italy.

== Career ==
His first work in the cinema world was a dubber for Mario Monicelli's first movie, The Paul Street Boys (1935). Subsequently, he worked for a radio, and in the meantime he started writing comic scripts. He also studied law, but without graduating.

He spent the first four years of World War II in France, as a prisoner of the French Army first and, later, of the Wehrmacht. He managed to escape, however, and fought for a year with the United States Army. Back from the front, he worked again in the radio and for wrote for theatre and humour magazine.

In wrote his first screenplay for The Two Orphans, directed by Mario Mattoli. In 1949 started his famous collaboration with Furio Scarpelli, as the duo Age & Scarpelli.

Together with Scarpelli, he worked on a total of 120 Italian movies. These include some of the most famous of all, such as Sergio Leone's The Good, the Bad and the Ugly, Mario Monicelli's Big Deal on Madonna Street and many Totò movies. He also worked on some scripts on his own, such as that of Pietro Germi's Divorce, Italian Style.

As an actor, he took part to La terrazza by Ettore Scola (screenplay by Age & Scarpelli, of course) and Ecce Bombo by Nanni Moretti.

== Death ==
He died in Rome in 2005.
