= Are We Men or Corporals? =

1955 film directed by Camillo Mastrocinque

- Directed by: Camillo Mastrocinque
- Written by: Totò; Camillo Mastrocinque; Vittorio Metz; Mario Mangini; Francesco Nelli
- Story by: Totò
- Starring: Totò; Paolo Stoppa; Fiorella Mari
- Cinematography: Aldo Tonti
- Edited by: Gisa Radicchi Levi
- Music by: Alessandro Cicognini
- Release date: 1955
- Running time: 92 min
- Country: Italy
- Language: Italian

Are We Men or Corporals? (Italian: Siamo uomini o caporali) is a 1955 Italian comedy film directed by Camillo Mastrocinque.

== Plot ==
Toto is very good at acting, and so he is called in a study to be in a film. However he combines a mess and is offended by the director. Tired of the abuse of those most powerful, Toto tells a story to the director, to let him know that he is wrong.

These are the years of the Second World War, and Toto is imprisoned in a concentration camp, suffering the harassment of Colonel Hammler, a Nazi cruel and despotic. Toto suffers patiently all the wrongs that the powerful general administers him, and he's just waiting to get out of the containment field. When the war ends, Toto is taken in a theater company, but immediately he argues with the director, because he is a vulgar American who likes women, and that he is in love with Sonia, the dear friend of Toto. Indeed Toto hopes that one day the woman asks him to marry her, but this lucky day does not come.

When Toto is hunted by the theater company for beating his director, things are looking bad for him, because Toto is penniless. And so he agrees to do an extra in a movie. Now that Toto leaves the studio shooting, again he meets his old girlfriend Sonia, but she's married the director of theater...

== Distribution ==
=== Censorship ===
Italy in the 1950s had taken on the law of 1923, without having made any major changes. The scripts were delivered by the film producers, before the film began. The reasons are understandable: to avoid the damage caused by any censorship or by having hurt the susceptibility of part of the political class of government and opposition.

We are men or corporals, despite the cuts, if read carefully, it retains the strength of satire. There are numerous deleted scenes, both those of "naked ladies, semi-undressed models" but also of phrases such as: "these ministers (...) are ugly, ugly expressions, ugly faces"; while the phrase "it was better when it was worse" managed to survive in the final version of the film.

== Cast ==
- Totò: Totò Esposito
- Paolo Stoppa: The Corporal
- Fiorella Mari: Sonia
- Mara Werlen: Mimì
- Sylva Koscina: Aspiring actress
- Nerio Bernardi: Psychoanalyst
- Vincent Barbi: Mr. Black's Secretary
- Gino Buzzanca: Director
- Loris Gizzi: Tenor
- Giacomo Furia: Nerone
- Franca Faldini: Gabriella
- Rosita Pisano: Filomena Ossobuco
- Vinicio Sofia: Cesarino Ossobuco
- Gildo Bocci: Testimone
- Salvo Libassi: Journalist
