= Peppino, le modelle e chella là =

1957 film

- Film poster
- Directed by: Mario Mattoli
- Starring: Gino Bramieri
- Cinematography: Anchise Brizzi
- Edited by: Gisa Radicchi Levi
- Music by: Lelio Luttazzi
- Release date: 1957
- Running time: 91 minutes
- Country: Italy
- Language: Italian

Peppino, le modelle e chella là is a 1957 Italian comedy film directed by Mario Mattoli and starring Gino Bramieri.

== Cast ==
- Gino Bramieri
- Peppino De Filippo
- Franco Di Trocchio
- Fulvia Franco
- Giacomo Furia
- Salvo Libassi
- Guido Martufi
- Ester Masing
- Violetta Nardon
- Teddy Reno
- Giulia Rubini
- Massimo Serato
- Renato Terra
- Attilio Tosato
- Paolo Zitelli
