= Mario Mattoli =

Italian film director and screenwriter (1898–1980)

- Mattoli in 1963
- Born: 30 November 1898; Tolentino, Province of Macerata, Marche, Kingdom of Italy
- Died: 26 February 1980 (aged 81); Rome, Italy
- Occupations: Film director; Film producer; Screenwriter
- Spouse: Mity Mignone (m. 1928)

Mario Mattoli (Italian pronunciation: [ˈmaːrjo matˈtɔːli]; 30 November 1898 – 26 February 1980) was an Italian film director and screenwriter. He directed 86 films between 1934 and 1966.

== Biography ==
Mario Mattoli was born in Tolentino, Macerata, on 30 November 1898. After earning his law degree, he began working for the impresarios Emilio Suvini and Luigi Zerboni. In 1927, he co-founded the experimental theatre and revue company Spettacoli Za-bum, which launched the careers of several major Italian stars, including Vittorio De Sica, Alberto Sordi, Erminio Macario, Aldo Fabrizi and Enrico Viarisio. In 1928, he married Mity Mignone, a renowned stage actress who performed alongside her siblings, Totò and Carolina (known professionally as Milly), in the era's leading variety shows. The trio disbanded shortly after Mity’s marriage.

Building on the success of his theatre company, Mattoli expanded into cinema in 1932 by producing two films: the comedies Everybody's Secretary, directed by Amleto Palermi, and Bad Subject, directed by Carlo Ludovico Bragaglia. Both films were produced under his Za-bum film production company. Mattoli made his directorial debut in 1934 with the film Full Speed, starring Vittorio De Sica. Over the course of his 32-year career, he directed 84 feature films, often writing the screenplays himself. He explored a wide range of genres, including tear-jerking melodramas, mythological epics, science fiction and comedies. Despite his popularity with audiences, he was a frequent target of criticism and never received any significant awards. Some of his films, particularly those featuring Totò, such as Poverty and Nobility, Neapolitan Turk, and Gentlemen Are Born, are now considered classics of commedia all'italiana. His 1939 film Defendant, Stand Up! was shown as part of a retrospective on Italian comedy at the 67th Venice International Film Festival.

== Filmography ==
- Full Speed (1934)
- I Love You Only (1935)
- The Man Who Smiles (1936)
- Sette giorni all'altro mondo (1936)
- La damigella di Bard (1936)
- Music in the Square (1936)
- The Last Days of Pompeo (1937)
- These Children (1937)
- Felicità Colombo (1937)
- Destiny (1938)
- Triumph of Love (1938)
- Nonna Felicità (1938)
- A Lady Did It (1938)
- The Lady in White (1938)
- We Were Seven Sisters (1939)
- At Your Orders, Madame (1939)
- We Were Seven Widows (1939)
- Defendant, Stand Up! (1939)
- Mille chilometri al minuto! (1939)
- Lo vedi come sei... lo vedi come sei? (1939)
- Abandonment (1940)
- The Pirate's Dream (1940)
- Non me lo dire! (1940)
- Light in the Darkness (1941)
- Schoolgirl Diary (1941)
- I Live as I Please (1942)
- Invisible Chains (1942)
- The Three Pilots (1942)
- The Lady Is Fickle (1942)
- Sealed Lips (1942)
- Nothing New Tonight (1942)
- La valle del diavolo (1943)
- Lively Teresa (1943)
- Anything for a Song (1943)
- The Last Wagon (1943)
- The Za-Bum Circus (1944)
- Life Begins Anew (1945)
- Departure at Seven (1946)
- The Two Orphans (1947)
- Toto Tours Italy (1948)
- Fear and Sand (1948)
- Cab Number 13 (1948)
- Assunta Spina (1948)
- Little Lady (1949)
- The Firemen of Viggiù (1949)
- Adam and Eve (1949)
- Totò Tarzan (1950)
- The Merry Widower (1950)
- The Elusive Twelve (1950)
- The Cadets of Gascony (1950)
- Toto the Sheik (1950)
- Toto the Third Man (1951)
- The Steamship Owner (1951)
- Arrivano i nostri (1951)
- My Heart Sings (1951)
- Accidents to the Taxes!! (1951)
- Five Paupers in an Automobile (1952)
- Sardinian Vendetta (1952)
- Neapolitan Turk (1953)
- Siamo tutti inquilini (1953)
- Funniest Show on Earth (1953)
- Two Nights with Cleopatra (1954)
- Toto Seeks Peace (1954)
- The Doctor of the Mad (1954)
- Poverty and Nobility (1954)
- L'ultimo amante (1955)
- Eighteen Year Olds (1955)
- I giorni più belli (1956)
- Peppino, le modelle e chella là (1957)
- Toto, Peppino and the Fanatics (1958)
- Move and I'll Shoot (1958)
- Tipi da spiaggia (1959)
- Prepotenti più di prima (1959)
- Non perdiamo la testa (1959)
- Guardatele ma non toccatele (1959)
- Gentlemen Are Born (1960)
- Un mandarino per Teo (1960)
- Appuntamento a Ischia (1960)
- Toto, Fabrizi and the Young People Today (1960)
- Sua Eccellenza si fermò a mangiare (1961)
- Hercules in the Valley of Woe (1961)
- Appuntamento in Riviera (1962)
- 5 marines per 100 ragazze (1962)
- Obiettivo ragazze (1963)
- Corpse for the Lady (1964)
- For a Few Dollars Less (1966)
