= Totò =

Italian actor (1898–1967)

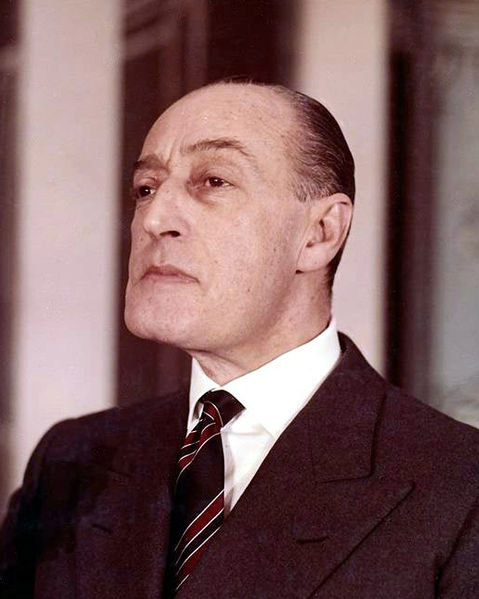
- Totò in a 1960s photograph
- Born: Antonio Vincenzo Stefano Clemente; 15 February 1898; Naples, Kingdom of Italy
- Died: 15 April 1967 (aged 69); Rome, Italy
- Other name: Il Principe della risata
- Occupations: Actor; screenwriter; comedian; playwright; singer; poet; lyricist
- Years active: 1922–1967
- Spouse: Diana Bandini Rogliani (m. 1935; ann. 1939)
- Partners: Liliana Castagnola (1929–1930); Franca Faldini (1952–1967)
- Children: 2, including Liliana de Curtis

Signature
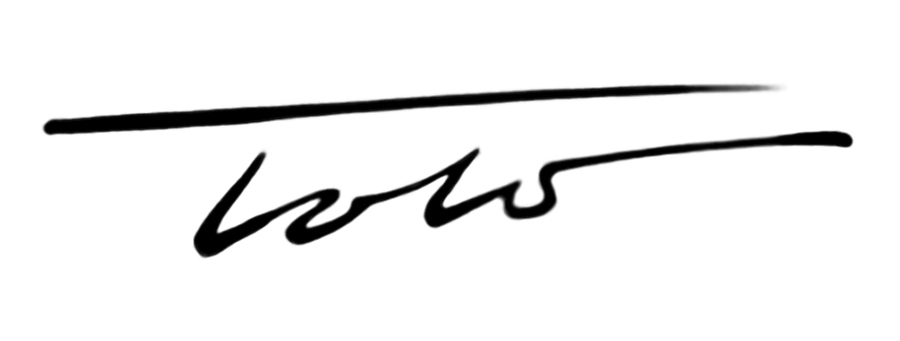

Antonio Griffo Focas Flavio Angelo Ducas Comneno Porfirogenito Gagliardi De Curtis di Bisanzio (born Antonio Vincenzo Stefano Clemente; 15 February 1898 – 15 April 1967), best known by his stage name Totò (Note: Italian pronunciation: [toˈtɔ]; Totò is a common pet name for Antonio in Naples and surroundings, a contraction from the Neapolitan dialect nickname Totonno.) or simply as Antonio de Curtis, and nicknamed il Principe della risata ("the Prince of Laughter"), was an Italian actor, comedian, screenwriter, dramatist, poet, singer and lyricist. He is commonly referred to as one of the most popular Italian performers of all time. While best known for his funny and sometimes cynical comic characters in theatre and then many successful comedy films made from the 1940s to the 1960s, he also worked with many iconic Italian film directors in dramatic roles.

== Early life ==
Totò was born Antonio Vincenzo Stefano Clemente on 15 February 1898 in the Rione Sanità, a poor district of Naples, the illegitimate son of Anna Clemente (1881–1947), a Sicilian woman from Palermo, and the Neapolitan marquis Giuseppe de Curtis (1873–1944). His father did not legally recognize him, and Totò so regretted growing up without a father that in 1933, at age 35, he managed to have the marquis Francesco Maria Gagliardi Focas adopt him in exchange for a life annuity. As a consequence, when Marquis de Curtis finally recognized him in 1937, Totò had become an heir of two noble families, ultimately claiming an impressive slew of titles.

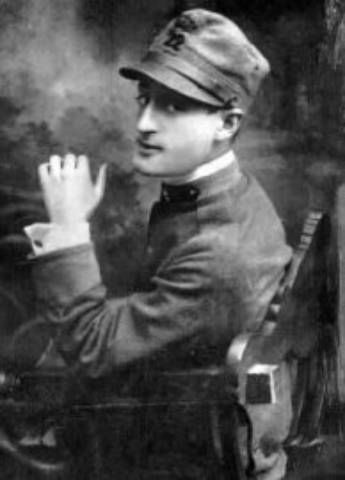
Totò as a soldier in 1918

Totò's mother wanted him to become a priest, but as early as 1913, at the age of 15, he was already acting as a comedian in small theatres, under the pseudonym Clerment. His early repertoire mostly consisted in imitations of Gustavo De Marco's characters. In the minor venues where he performed, Totò had the chance to meet famous artists like Eduardo and Peppino De Filippo. He served in the Italian Army during World War I and then went back to acting. He learned the art of the guitti, the Neapolitan scriptless comedians, heirs to the tradition of the Commedia dell'Arte, and began developing the trademarks of his style, including a puppet-like, disjointed gesticulation, emphasized facial expressions, and an extreme, sometimes surrealistic, sense of humor, largely based on emphasizing primitive urges such as hunger and sexual desire.

== Career ==
In 1922, he moved to Rome to perform in bigger theatres. He performed in the genre of avanspettacolo, a vaudevillian mixture of music, ballet and comedy preceding the main act (hence its name, which roughly translates as "before show"). He became adept at these shows (also known as rivista – Revue), and in the 1930s he had his own company, with which he travelled across Italy. In 1937, he appeared in his first movie Fermo con le mani, and later starred in 96 other films.

As the vast majority of his movies were essentially meant to showcase his performances, many have his name "Totò" in the title. Some of his best-known films are Fear and Sand, Toto Tours Italy, Toto the Sheik, Cops and Robbers, Toto and the Women, Totò Tarzan, Toto the Third Man, Toto in Color (one of the first Italian color movies, 1952, in Ferraniacolor), Big Deal on Madonna Street, Toto, Peppino, and the Hussy, The Law Is the Law. Pier Paolo Pasolini's The Hawks and the Sparrows and the episode "Che cosa sono le nuvole" from Caprice Italian Style (the latter released after his death), showed his dramatic skills.

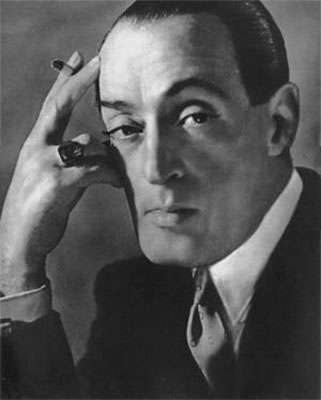
Totò in the 1930s

In his vast cinematographic career, Totò had the opportunity to act side by side with virtually all major Italian actors of the time. With some of them he paired in several films, the most renowned and successful teams being established with Aldo Fabrizi and Peppino De Filippo. De Filippo was one of the few actors to have his name appear in movie titles along with that of Totò, for example in Toto, Peppino, and the Hussy and Toto and Peppino Divided in Berlin.

Partly because of the radical, naive immorality of his roles, some of his more spicy gags raised much controversy in a society that was both strictly Catholic and ruled by the conservative Democrazia Cristiana (Christian Democracy) party. For example, Totò's 1964 film What Ever Happened to Baby Toto? (a parody of What Ever Happened to Baby Jane?) included a humorous celebration of cannabis in an era when drugs were perceived by the Italian audience as something exotic, depraved and dangerous.

=== Writing ===
During the 1950s, he started to compose poetry. The best-known is probably 'A Livella, in which an arrogant rich man and a humble poor man meet after their deaths and discuss their differences. Totò was also a songwriter: Malafemmena (Wayward Woman), dedicated to his wife Diana after they separated, is considered a classic of the Neapolitan popular music.

== Personal life ==
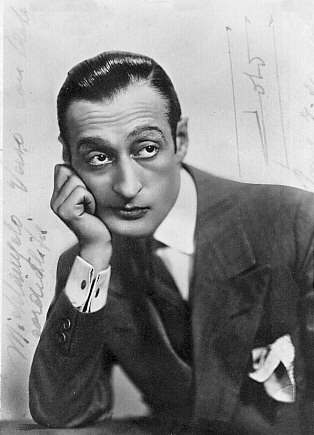
Totò in 1943

Totò had a reputation as a playboy. One of his lovers, the well known chanteuse and dancer Liliana Castagnola, committed suicide after their relationship ended. This tragedy marked his life. He buried Liliana in his family's chapel, and named his only daughter Liliana (born 10 May 1933 to his wife, Diana Bandini Rogliani, whom he married in 1935).

Another personal tragedy was the premature birth of his son Massenzio in 1954. The child died a few hours later. He was the son of Totò's mistress Franca Faldini. During a tour in 1956, he lost most of his eyesight due to an eye infection that he had ignored to avoid cancelling his show and disappointing his fans. Arguably however, the handicap almost never affected his schedule and acting abilities.

Totò died at the age of 69 on 15 April 1967 in Rome after a series of heart attacks. Due to overwhelming demand, there were no fewer than three funeral services: the first in Rome, a second in his birth city of Naples—and a few days later, in a third one by the local Camorra boss, an empty casket was carried along the packed streets of the popular Rione Sanità quarter where he was born.

== Noble titles ==
In 1946, when the Consulta Araldica—the body that advised the Kingdom of Italy on matters of nobility—ceased operations, the Tribunal of Naples recognized his numerous titles, so his full name was changed from Antonio Clemente to Antonio Griffo Focas Flavio Ducas Comneno Porfirogenito Gagliardi De Curtis di Bisanzio, His Imperial Highness, Palatine Count, Knight of the Holy Roman Empire, Exarch of Ravenna, Duke of Macedonia and Illyria, Prince of Constantinople, Cilicia, Thessaly, Pontus, Moldavia, Dardania, Peloponnesus, Count of Cyprus and Epirus, Count and Duke of Drivasto and Durazzo. For someone born and raised in one of the poorest Neapolitan neighbourhoods, this must have been quite an achievement, but in claiming the titles (at the time they had become meaningless) the comedian also mocked them for their intrinsic worthlessness. In fact, when he was not using his stage name Totò, he mostly referred to himself simply as Antonio de Curtis.

== Filmography ==
=== Actor ===
Totò starred in 97 films:

- Hands Off Me! (1937) as Antonio 'Totò' Toretota
- Mad Animals (1939) as Totò / Barone Tolomeo dei Tolomei
- Saint John, the Beheaded (1940) as Mastro Agostino Miciacio
- The Happy Ghost (1941) as Nicolino & Gelsomino & Antonino
- Two Hearts Among the Beasts (1943) as Totò
- Arcobaleno (1943)
- Romulus and the Sabines (1945) as Aristide Tromboni
- The Two Orphans (1947) as Gasparre
- Toto Tours Italy (1948) as Prof. Toto' Casamandrei
- Fear and Sand (1948) as Nicolino Capece
- The Firemen of Viggiù (1949) as The Suitor - Disguises Himself as Dummy / Band Leader
- Yvonne of the Night (1949) as Nino, il fantasista
- Toto Looks for a House (1949) as Beniamino Lomacchio
- The Emperor of Capri (1949) as Antonio De Fazio
- Totò Le Mokò (1949) as Antonio Lumaconi / Totò le Moko
- Side Street Story (1950) as Pasquale Miele
- Figaro Here, Figaro There (1950) as Figaro
- Toto Looks for a Wife (1950) as Toto
- Totò Tarzan (1950) as Antonio Della Buffas
- Bluebeard's Six Wives (1950) as Totò Esposito
- Toto the Sheik (1950) as Antonio Sapore, il maggiordomo
- 47 morto che parla (1950) as Il barone Antonio Peletti
- Toto the Third Man (1951) as Piero / Paolo / Totò
- Seven Hours of Trouble (1951) as Totò De Pasquale
- Cops and Robbers (1951) as Ferdinando Esposito
- Toto in Color (1952) as Antonio Scannagatti
- Toto and the King of Rome (1952) as Ercole Pappalardo
- Toto and the Women (1952) as Antonio Scaparro
- One of Those (1953) as Rocco
- Man, Beast and Virtue (1953) as Prof. Paolino
- Neapolitan Turk (1953) as Felice Sciosciammocca
- Funniest Show on Earth (1953) as Tottons, il clown / Una signora del pubblico
- Of Life and Love (1954) as Rosario Chiarchiaro (segment "La patente")
- Where Is Freedom? (1954) as Salvatore Lojacono
- A Slice of Life (1954) as Il fotografo
- Poverty and Nobility (1954) as Felice Sciosciammocca
- The Doctor of the Mad (1954) as Felice Sciosciammocca
- The Three Thieves (1954) as Tapioca
- Toto Seeks Peace (1954) as Gennaro Piselli
- The Gold of Naples (1954) as Don Saverio Petrillo (segment "Il guappo")
- Toto and Carolina (1955) as Antonio Caccavallo
- Toto in Hell (1955) as Antonio Marchi / March' Antonio
- Carousel of Variety (1955)
- Are We Men or Corporals? (1955) as Toto Esposito
- Destination Piovarolo (1955) as Antonio La Quaglia
- Roman Tales (1955) as Professore Semprini
- Il coraggio (1955) as Gennaro Vaccariello
- The Band of Honest Men (1956) as Antonio Buonocore
- Totò Double or Nothing (1956) as Duca Gagliardo della Forcoletta
- Toto, Peppino, and the Hussy (1956) as Antonio Caponi
- Toto, Peppino and the Outlaws (1956) as Antonio
- The Lady Doctor (1957) as Michele 'Mike' Spillone
- Toto and Marcellino (1958) as Il professore
- The Law Is the Law (1958) as Giuseppe La Paglia
- Big Deal on Madonna Street (1958) as Dante Cruciani
- Toto, Peppino and the Fanatics (1958) as Ragionier Antonio Vignanelli
- Toto in Paris (1958) as Marchese Gastone de Chemantel / Chateau-Boiron / il vagabondo Totò
- Toto in the Moon (1958) as Pasquale Belafronte
- Legs of Gold (1958) as barone Luigi Fontana
- Toto in Madrid (1959) as Totò Scorceletti
- The Overtaxed (1959) as Torquato Pezzella
- I ladri (1959) as Commissario Di Sapio
- You're on Your Own (1959) as Il nonno illuminato
- La cambiale (1959) as Cesare Posalaquaglia
- Tough Guys (1960) as L'Algerino
- Gentlemen Are Born (1960) as Ottone Degli Ulivi, detto Zazà
- Toto, Fabrizi and the Young People Today (1960) as Antonio Cocozza
- Letto a tre piazze (1960) as Antonio Di Cosimo
- The Passionate Thief (1960) as Umberto 'Infortunio' Pennazzuto
- Who Hesitates Is Lost (1960) as Antonio Guardalavecchia
- Totò ciak (1960) as Toto
- Totò, Peppino e... la dolce vita (1961) as Antonio Barbacane
- Sua Eccellenza si fermò a mangiare (1961) as The So-Called Dr Biagio Tanzarella
- Totòtruffa 62 (1961) as Antonio Peluffo
- The Two Marshals (1961) as Antonio Capurro
- Toto vs. Maciste (1962) as Totokamen Sabachi
- Totò Diabolicus (1962) as Marquis Galeazzo di Torrealta / Gen. Scipione di Torrealta / Prof. Carlo di Torrealta / Baroness Laudomia di Torrealta / Mons. Antonino di Torrealta / Pasquale Bonocore
- Lo smemorato di Collegno (1962) as Lo smemorato
- Toto and Peppino Divided in Berlin (1962) as Antonio La Puzza / Canarinis
- Toto's First Night (1962) as Nini
- The Two Colonels (1962) as Colonnello Di Maggio
- The Shortest Day (1962) as Frate bersagliere
- Toto vs. the Four (1963) as Antonio Saracino
- The Monk of Monza (1963) as Pasquale Cicciacalda / Don Manuel
- Toto and Cleopatra (1963) as Mark Antony / Totonno
- Le motorizzate (1963) as Urbano Cacace (segment "Il Vigile Ignoto")
- Sexy Toto (1963) as Nini Cantachiaro
- Gli onorevoli (1963) as Antonio La Trippa
- The Commandant (1963) as Col. Antonio Cavalli
- Toto vs. the Black Pirate (1964) as José
- Beautiful Families (1964) as Filiberto Comanducci (segment "Amare è un po' morire")
- What Ever Happened to Baby Toto? (1964) as Totò Baby / il Padre
- Toto of Arabia (1965) as Totò
- Latin Lovers (1965) as Antonio Gargiulo (segment "Amore e morte")
- The Mandrake (1965) as Il Frate
- Rita the American Girl (1965) as Serafino Benvenuti
- The Hawks and the Sparrows (1966) as Innocenti Totò / Brother Ciccillo
- Treasure of San Gennaro (1966) as Don Vincenzo
- The Witches (1967) as Ciancicato Miao (segment "La terra vista dalla luna")
- The Head of the Family (1968) as Man at Funeral (uncredited, released posthumously)
- Caprice Italian Style (1968) as Anziano signore (segment "Mostro della domenica, Il") / Iago (segment "Che cosa sono le nuvole?") (final film role, released posthumously)

=== Screenwriter ===
- Il medico dei pazzi
- Totò all'inferno
- Siamo uomini o caporali
- Il coraggio
- I due marescialli

=== TV ===
- TuttoTotò (1967, aired posthumously)

== See also ==
- "Malafemmena", a 1951 song written by Totò

== Bibliography ==
- Giancarlo Governi. Il pianeta Totò. Gremese, 1992. ISBN 887605703X.
- Liliana De Curtis, Matilde Amorosi. Totò a prescindere. Mondadori, 1992. ISBN 8804584521.
- Ennio Bìspuri. Totò: principe clown. Guida Editori, 1997. ISBN 8871881575.
- Alberto Anile. Il cinema di Totò: (1930-1945) : l'estro funambolo e l'ameno spettro. Le mani, 1997. ISBN 8880120514.
- Associazione Antonio De Curtis. Totò, partenopeo e parte napoletano: il teatro, la poesia, la musica. Marsilio, 1998. ISBN 8831770861.
- Alberto Anile. I film di Totò (1946-1967): la maschera tradita. Le mani, 1998.
- Costanzo Ioni, Ruggero Guarini. Tutto Totò. Gremese Editore, 1999. ISBN 8877423277.
- Ennio Bìspuri. Vita di Totò. Gremese Editore, 2000. ISBN 8884400023.
- Franca Faldini, Goffredo Fofi. Totò: l'uomo e la maschera. L'Ancora del Mediterraneo, 2000. ISBN 8883250133.
- Paolo Pistolese. Totò, stars and stripes. Cinecittà, 2000.
- Orio Caldiron. Totò. Gremese Editore, 2001. ISBN 8877424133.
- Antonio Napolitano. Totò, uno e centomila. Tempo Lungo Ed., 2001. ISBN 8887480141.
- Fabio Rossi. La lingua in gioco: da Totò a lezione di retorica. Bulzoni, 2002. ISBN 888319697X.
- Orio Caldiron. Il principe Totò. Gremese Editore, 2002. ISBN 8884402166.
- Liliana De Curtis. Totò, mio padre. Rizzoli, 2002. ISBN 8817117579.
- Daniela Aronica, Gino Frezza, Raffaele Pinto. Totò. Linguaggi e maschere del comico. Carocci, 2003. ISBN 8843027867.
- Patricia Bianchi, Nicola De Blasi. Totò parole di attore e di poeta. Dante & Descartes, 2007. ISBN 8861570127.
- Sonia Pedalino. Totò e la maschera. Firenze Atheneum, 2007. ISBN 8872553040.
- Edmondo Capecelatro, Daniele Gallo. Totò: vita e arte di un genio. Viator, 2008. ISBN 8890387203.
- Liliana De Curtis, Matilde Amorosi. Malafemmena: il romanzo dell'unico, vero, grande amore di Totò. Mondadori, 2009. ISBN 8804584521.
- Ornella Di Russo. Cogito ergo De Curtis. Fermenti, 2013. ISBN 8897171389.
