= Verginità =

- Film poster
- Directed by: Leonardo De Mitri
- Starring: Irene Genna
- Cinematography: Giuseppe La Torre
- Music by: Gino Filippini
- Release date: 4 September 1951
- Country: Italy
- Language: Italian

Verginità is a 1951 Italian melodrama film written and directed by Leonardo De Mitri.

== Plot ==
A country girl who is a diligent devourer of picture stories, decides to participate in a beauty contest without the consent of her father. She dreams of a glamorous career in the big city. When she loses the contest, she is approached by two men who offer her a modeling job. However, they are in fact human traffickers who intend to lure her to Brazil.

== Cast ==
- Irene Genna as Gina
- Leonardo Cortese as Franco Rossi
- Franca Marzi as Giulia
- Otello Toso as Giancarlo
- Eleonora Rossi Drago as Mara Sibilia
- Arnoldo Foà as René
- Tamara Lees as Lidia
- Checco Durante as Mr. Corelli
- Guglielmo Barnabò as Impresario
- Mario Siletti
- Mario Ferrari
