= Cats and Dogs (1952 film) =

1952 film

- Directed by: Leonardo De Mitri
- Written by: Jacopo Comin; Leonardo De Mitri; Mario Monicelli; Cesare Rivelli
- Produced by: Luigi Freddi
- Starring: Titina De Filippo; Umberto Spadaro; Antonella Lualdi
- Cinematography: Marco Scarpelli
- Edited by: Lionello Massobrio; Maria Rosada
- Music by: Gino Filippini
- Production company: Record Pictures
- Distributed by: Indipendenti regionali
- Release date: 1952
- Running time: 91 minutes
- Country: Italy
- Language: Italian

Cats and Dogs (Italian: Cani e gatti) is a 1952 Italian comedy film directed by Leonardo De Mitri and starring Titina De Filippo, Umberto Spadaro and Antonella Lualdi. The film's sets were designed by the art director Franco Lolli.

== Plot ==
In a village, the pharmacist and the innkeeper have an intense rivalry fuelled by the fact that they were once romantically involved many years before. To spite her rival, the innkeeper arranges to have her nephew set up a second pharmacy to take business away him. Unbeknownst to them a romance is developing between the younger generation of the families.

== Cast ==
- Titina De Filippo as Donna Elvira
- Umberto Spadaro as Don Filippo
- Antonella Lualdi as Lia
- Armando Francioli as Sandro
- Paolo Stoppa as Don Cosimo
- Carlo Romano as Don Saverio
- Marisa Merlini as Donna Filomena
- Carlo Sposito as Tonino
- Gianni Cavalieri as Don Michele
- Pietro Carloni as Cav. Anselmi
- Silvio Bagolini
