= Wives and Obscurities =

1956 film

- Directed by: Leonardo De Mitri
- Written by: Gaspare Cataldo; Leonardo De Mitri; Marcello Fondato; Ugo Guerra; Giulio Morelli
- Produced by: Elio Scardamaglia
- Starring: Gino Cervi; Walter Chiari; Enrico Viarisio
- Cinematography: Mario Capriotti
- Edited by: Otello Colangeli
- Music by: Gino Filippini
- Production company: Società Italiana Cines
- Release date: 23 October 1956
- Running time: 93 minutes
- Country: Italy
- Language: Italian

Wives and Obscurities (Italian:Moglie e buoi...) is a 1956 Italian comedy film directed by Leonardo De Mitri and starring Gino Cervi, Walter Chiari and Enrico Viarisio.

The film's sets were designed by the art director Franco Lolli.

== Cast ==
- Gino Cervi as John Cattabriga
- Walter Chiari as Frank Cattabriga, suo figlio
- Enrico Viarisio as Evaristo
- Federica Ranchi as Luisa
- Sandra Milo as Silvana
- Lia Di Leo as Gemma
- Vilma Viani as Amica di Luisa
- Eva Vanicek as Patrizia
- Cristina Fantoni as Edera
- Annamaria Mustari
- Clelia Matania as Signora Zanarini
- Laura Carli as Contessa Adelaide Bevilacqua
- Vittoria Crispo as Signora Bertoni
- Nietta Zocchi as Signora Tumedei
- Marcella Rovena as Signora Baglioni
- Nino Taranto as Carmine Petriccone
- Gianni Minervini as Cesarino
- Cristina Pall as Infirmiera Cesira
- Erminio Spalla as Oste
- Loris Gizzi as Signor Baglioni
- Renato Izzo as Giovanotto del paese
- Ignazio Leone as Giovanotto del paese
- Gianni Loti as Giovanotto del paese
- Libero Grandi as Giovanotto del paese
- Filippo Gregori as Giovanotto del paese
- Isarco Ravaioli as Giovanotto del paese
- Roberto Onorati as Tonino
- Amalia Pellegrini as cameriera dei Bevilacqua
- Nerio Bernardi
- Corrado Annicelli
- Franco Cobianchi
- Franca Dominici
- Andrea De Pino
- Dino Maronetto
- Mario Frera
- Nino Capozzi
- Carlo Taranto as aiutante di Carmine
- Nanda Primavera
- Terry Dalton
- Carlo Duse

== Bibliography ==
- Geoffrey Nowell-Smith. The Companion to Italian Cinema. Cassell, 1996.
