= Altair (film) =

- Directed by: Leonardo De Mitri
- Written by: Diego Calcagno; Ugo Guerra; Leonardo De Mitri; Cesare Giulio Viola
- Story by: Manlio Lo Cascio
- Starring: Franco Interlenghi; Antonella Lualdi; Jacques Sernas
- Narrated by: Arnoldo Foà
- Cinematography: Marco Scarpelli
- Edited by: Niccolò Lazzari
- Music by: Gino Filippini
- Release date: 9 February 1956
- Language: Italian

Altair is a 1956 Italian melodrama film directed by Leonardo De Mitri and starring Franco Interlenghi, Antonella Lualdi and Jacques Sernas.

== Plot ==
Naples. In the military academy of the Nisida Air Force a new course begins which sees among the new recruits called "chicks": Giorgio, forced by his father after he squandered millions at the gaming table; De Montel son of a general, Mario who wants to follow in the footsteps of his father who died in combat; Antonio who declares himself Neapolitan while coming from the province and Ugo who comes from the north.

Giorgio suffers from the rigid military life from which he always tries to escape while the others are interested in his career. During a leave of absence, De Montel meets Luisa, Giorgio's sister who has returned to the game table in plain clothes. The captain puts him under arrest and he convinces the comrade that it was Mario who was the spy and that he must be isolated.

Giorgio meets Elena, a hostess several times, thanks to which he begins to understand the importance of not only an emotional commitment. De Montel discovers that he has a weak heart that does not allow him to continue his military life and Mario, disappointed by the isolation in which he finds himself, thinks of leaving his uniform and going back to work in his mother's tobacconist. When after months Giorgio discovers Mario's innocence he goes to him to apologize and convince him to return to the academy, he also learns that Elena has just died in a plane crash.

The academic year ends, De Montel is forced to leave due to health problems while the others have earned the driver's badge. At the time of saying goodbye, Giorgio confesses that he wants to remain in the body until he becomes a general and Mario gives the badge to De Montel which is part of him accompanied by Luisa.

== Cast ==
- Franco Interlenghi as Giorgio Farini
- Antonella Lualdi as Elena Grimani
- Jacques Sernas as De Montel
- Claude Laydu as Mario Rossi
- Carlo Croccolo as Antonio Labbate
- Marisa Borroni as Luisa Farini
- Nerio Bernardi as The Colonel
- Enzo Fiermonte
- Luigi Tosi
- Nino Vingelli
- Nino Imparato
- Rino Genovese
- Carlo Tamberlani
- Piero Carnabuci
