= The Two Sisters (film) =

1950 film

- Directed by: Mario Volpe
- Written by: Enrica Bacci; Aida Marchetti; Hally Müldray; Wanda Petti; Mario Volpe
- Starring: Vera Carmi; Enzo Fiermonte; Checco Durante
- Cinematography: Mauro Chiodini
- Edited by: Dolores Tamburini
- Music by: Gino Filippini
- Production company: Venere Film
- Distributed by: Independenti Regionali
- Release date: 1950
- Running time: 82 minutes
- Country: Italy
- Language: Italian
- Box office: ₤110 million

The Two Sisters (Italian: Le due sorelle) is a 1950 Italian melodrama film directed by Mario Volpe and starring Vera Carmi, Enzo Fiermonte and Checco Durante. The film's sets were designed by the art director Ivo Battelli. It was made at the Palatino Studios in Rome while location shooting took place around Matera in Basilicata.

== Synopsis ==
A rakish young aristocrat seduces a young woman and gets her pregnant. He abandons her and then returns some years later to try a similar trick on her younger sister.

== Cast ==
- Vera Carmi as Franca
- Enzo Fiermonte as Barone Enrico
- Checco Durante as Fattore Cosimo
- Jone Paoli as Almina
- Fedele Gentile as Antonio
- Sandro Ruffini as Padre Giovanni
- Mara Landi as Gilda
- Anita Durante as Agata
- Gina Amendola as Chiarina
- Luigi Erminio D'Olivo as Decio
- Amedeo Girardi as Il Dottore
- Lora Silvani as Agnesina
- Roberto Spiombi as Nicola
- Ugo Urbino as Cecè

== Bibliography ==
- Chiti, Roberto & Poppi, Roberto. Dizionario del cinema italiano: Dal 1945 al 1959. Gremese Editore, 1991.
