= Leonardo De Mitri =

Italian film director and screenwriter

- Born: 31 August 1914; Mola di Bari, Apulia, Italy
- Died: 16 July 1956 (aged 41); Ravenna, Emilia-Romagna, Italy
- Occupations: Actor, writer, director
- Years active: 1949–1956 (film)

Leonardo De Mitri (1914–1956) was an Italian film director and screenwriter.

== Selected filmography ==
- The Outlaws (1950)
- Cats and Dogs (1952)
- The Angel of Sin (1952)
- Verginità (1952)
- Martin Toccaferro (1953)
- Altair (1956)
- Wives and Obscurities (1956)

== Bibliography ==
- Goble, Alan. The Complete Index to Literary Sources in Film. Walter de Gruyter, 1999.
