= The Black Tent =

1956 British film by Brian Desmond Hurst

- British theatrical poster
- Directed by: Brian Desmond Hurst
- Written by: Bryan Forbes; Robin Maugham
- Based on: story The Promissory Note by Robin Maugham
- Produced by: William Macquitty executive Earl St. John
- Starring: Donald Sinden; Anthony Steel; Anna Maria Sandri; André Morell; Donald Pleasence
- Edited by: Alfred Roome
- Music by: William Alwyn
- Production company: Rank Organisation
- Distributed by: Rank Film Distributors of America
- Release date: 6 April 1956 (UK)
- Running time: 93 minutes
- Country: United Kingdom
- Language: English
- Budget: £223,000
- Box office: 1,351,181 admissions (France)

The Black Tent is a 1956 British war film directed by Brian Desmond Hurst and starring Donald Sinden, Anthony Steel, Anna Maria Sandri, André Morell and Donald Pleasence. It is set in North Africa, during the Second World War and was filmed on location in Libya.

Along with Bengazi (1955), The Black Tent is one of the few feature films set in the last days of the British Military Administration of Libya from 1945 to 1951.

During the British retreat through Libya, British officer Captain David Holland takes shelter with a Bedouin tribe and marries the sheik's daughter. After the war his younger brother, who had believed him to be dead, learns that he may be alive in Libya – prompting him to set out and search for him.

== Plot ==
Colonel Sir Charles Holland receives a note at his country estate. He contacts the Foreign Office and is informed that his missing-in-action brother may still be alive in Libya. A promissory note dating from the Second World War has turned up at the British Embassy in Tripoli signed by his presumed-dead brother, who had given it to a nomadic Bedouin tribe.

Sir Charles goes to Libya, and guided into the desert by Ali in search of his brother, they track down the tribe. The chief, Sheik Salem ben Yussef, lives in a black tent. He admits to having sheltered his brother but is otherwise dismissive. However, Sir Charles spots that one of the women, Mabrouka, has a blond son of an age such that his brother could be the father. He confronts the chief, only to find the girl in question is his daughter. Sir Charles is asked to leave the camp, but the girl passes a paper to Ali. It is the diary of the brother's time in Libya.

The film then flashes back to a tank battle where blond-haired Captain Holland is sprawled unconscious beside his tank on the sand with a bad shoulder wound. When he comes to, he walks over the dunes until he collapses near a Bedouin encampment at an oasis. He is found by Mabrouka, who takes him to the camp, which consists of several black tents.

Captain Holland, having been tended by Mabrouka, recovers. He learns that Mabrouka is the sheik's daughter and is betrothed to Sheik Faris from another tribe. When a German reconnaissance vehicle arrives at the camp, Captain Holland hides in the Roman ruins at Leptis Magna. The senior German officer then finds Holland's service revolver in a tent. The chief persuades the Germans that he slit the captain's throat and kept the revolver as a souvenir.

Mabrouka and Captain Holland become romantically involved, to the obvious annoyance of Sheik Faris. He colludes with the Germans, who return to the ruins. Holland and Sheik Yussef kill them and Faris. The romance between Captain Holland and Mabrouka deepens, and they marry.

Learning of the British victory at El Alamein, Captain Holland seeks to return to the British lines but finds that his wife is pregnant. A group led by the Sheik and Captain Holland travel toward the British lines but come across a column of retreating Italian vehicles. Captain Holland sustains a fatal injury rescuing the sheik.

The film returns to the present day, with the sheik discussing the story with Sir Charles and his daughter. Sir Charles asks for a missing page from the diary and this is given. It confirms that Captain Holland is the father to the Arab boy. This means the boy should have inherited the estate in England rather than Sir Charles. Sir Charles discusses this with his nephew, but the boy decides to remain with the tribe, and he burns the page.

== Cast ==
- Donald Sinden as Colonel Sir Charles Holland
- Anthony Steel as Captain David Holland
- Anna Maria Sandri as Mabrouka ben Yussef
- André Morell as Sheik Salem ben Yussef
- Terence Sharkey as Daoud Holland
- Donald Pleasence as Ali
- Ralph Truman as Major Croft
- Anthony Bushell as Ambassador Baring
- Michael Craig as Sheik Faris
- Paul Homer as Khalil ben Yussef
- Anton Diffring as senior German officer
- Frederick Jaeger as Koch
- Derek Sydney as interpreter

== Original story ==
The film was based on an original story by Robin Maugham, who had served in the North African Desert during World War II. It first appeared as a short story Pay Bearer £20 in Cheque Au Porteur. He later published a version of the story under the title "Desert Bond" in Chambers Journal. Maugham later included the story under the title "The Black Tent" in a later anthology of his writings published in 1973 called The Black Tent – and Other Stories.

In the early 1950s Robert Clarke of Associated British considered buying the screen rights to the story. He decided not to but eventually hired Maugham to be his assistant.

== Production ==
Producer Walter MacQuitty was an enthusiast of location filming – his most recent pictures included The Beachcomber. The film was shot at Pinewood Studios and on location in Libya. The film unit was mostly based in Tripoli arriving in August 1955. The lead actress was Italian, appearing in her first English language film.

Star Donald Sinden had previously made Above Us the Waves with producer MacQuitty and Simba with director Brian Michael Hurst. It was an early film role for Michael Craig, who had recently signed to the Rank Organisation; it was the first time he made a movie on location.

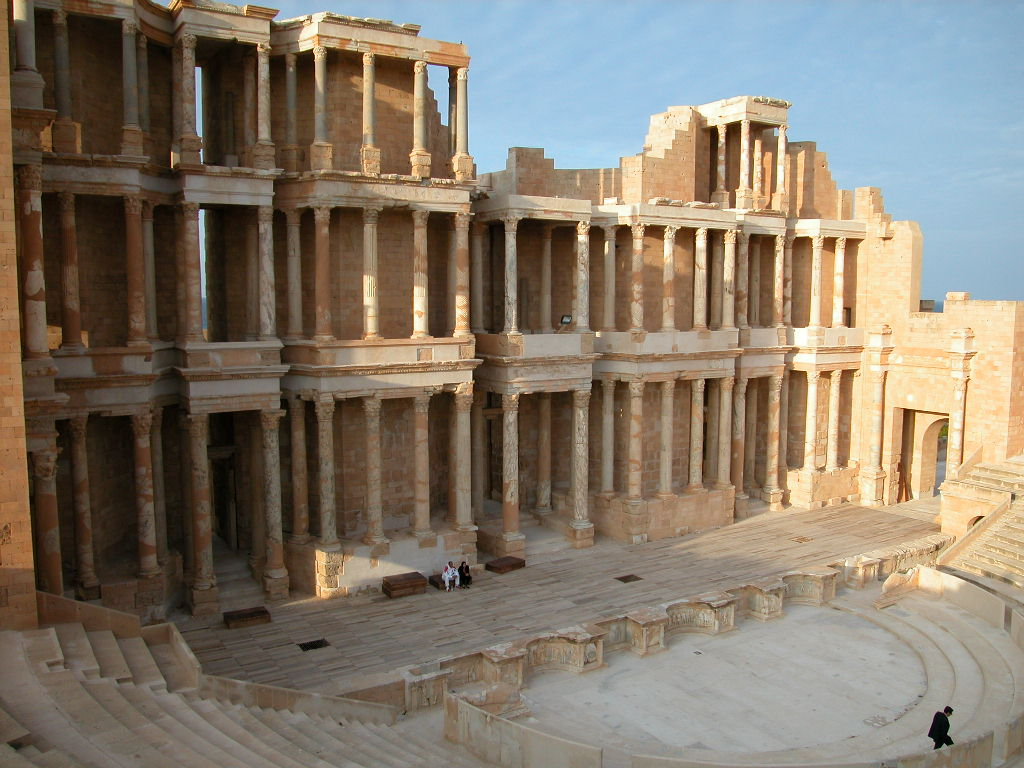
Several scenes were shot in the Roman theatre of Sabratha.

The film used the site of the Roman ruins at Sabratha in Libya, which is by the sea, although the plot suggests that the camp is deep in the Libyan desert. This is a plot device to provide a bit of eye candy to the viewer and a reason for the Germans to visit in small numbers, like regular tourists.

Macquitty later wrote Hurst "was meticulous in getting his way as a director and possessed an astounding ability to lay bare the psyche of anyone who opposed him. Generously he gave me a piece of his share in the picture – surely a unique gesture by a director to a producer."

== Release ==
The film was released in the US in 1957 on a double bill with Checkpoint (1956), also starring Anthony Steel.

== Reception ==
The Observer had trouble with the reality of the story but thought "the scenery is impressive and the tents... are interesting."

"Too bright, too clean, too polished", wrote The Times.

The Monthly Film Bulletin thought the "intelligently constructed" script was undermined by "disappointingly slack" direction.

Filmink called it "entertaining" although felt it might have done better with "a stronger female presence".

Turner Classic Movies calls the film "an odd duck... that has never received much fan love in its day or since, and in fact is barely remembered today. But it is, for one thing, the first English-language film shot largely in Libya" and which "plays like something of a prophecy – six years before the epochal on-location imagery and direct exploration of British colonialism we're all familiar with in David Lean's Lawrence of Arabia (1962), here are vast desert-dune landscapes punctuated by Englishmen and testy Bedouin on camels, with all of the culture-collision freight that implies."

== Books ==
Theirs is the Glory: Arnhem, Hurst and Conflict on Film takes Hurst's Battle of Arnhem epic as its centrepiece and then chronicles Hurst's life and experiences during the First World War and profiles each of his other nine films on conflict, including The Black Tent.

== Bibliography ==
- MacQuitty, William (1994). A Life to Remember. Quartet books. ISBN 9780704327894.
