= Turi Pandolfini =

Italian actor (1883–1962)

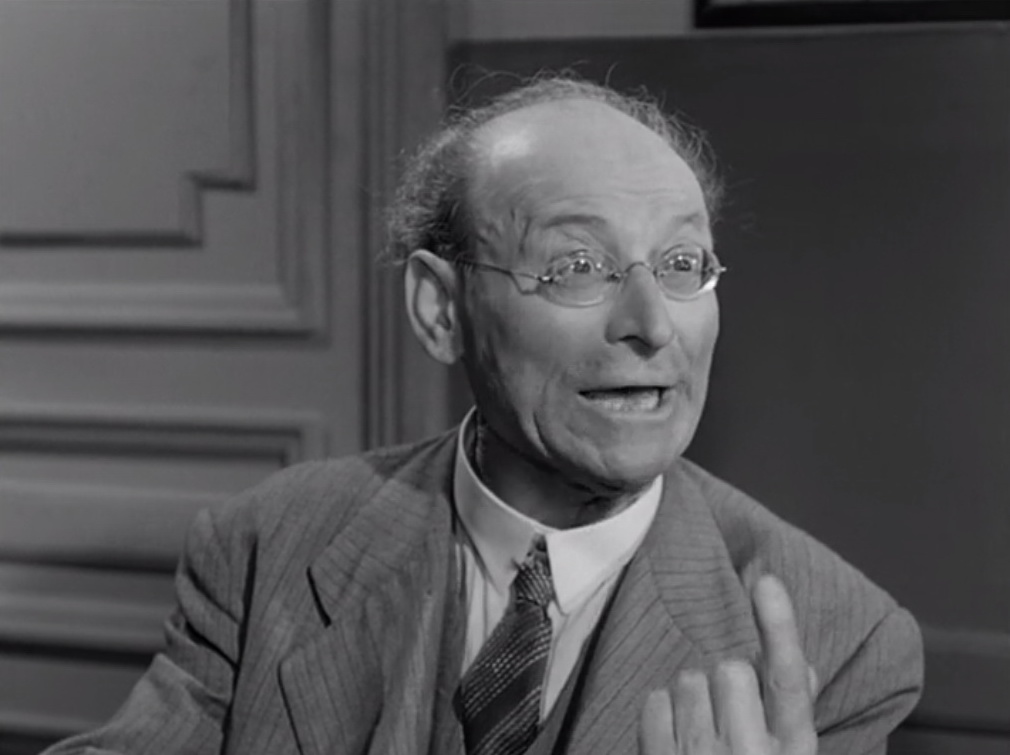
- Turi Pandolfini as Cannizzaro in It Happened at the Police Station (1954)
- Born: 1 November 1883; Catania, Sicily, Italy
- Died: 6 March 1962 (aged 78); Catania, Sicily, Italy
- Occupation: Actor
- Years active: 1917-1961

Turi Pandolfini (1 November 1883 – 6 March 1962) was an Italian stage and film character actor. He appeared in 46 films between 1917 and 1961.

== Life and career ==
Born in Catania, Sicily as Salvatore Pandolfini, the nephew of the actor Angelo Musco, he started his career at young age in small local companies before joining the company of his famous uncle in which he created a large number of successful macchiette ( (i.e. comical monologues caricaturing stock characters).

Pandolfini was also very active in films starting from the advent of sound, and reached the peak of his popularity in the fifties. He was one of the founders of the Teatro Stabile di Catania.

== Partial filmography ==
- La stella del cinema (1931)
- La vecchia signora (1932)
- La voce lontana (1933)
- 1860 (1933) - Another Sicilian citizen
- L'albergo della felicità (1933) - Ignazio Privitero
- The Marquis of Ruvolito (1939) - Neddu Grisi
- Sempre più difficile (1943) - Don Ignazio D'Azevegno
- In the Name of the Law (1949) - Don Fifì
- The Fighting Men (1950)
- The City Stands Trial (1952) - Ragionier Filippetti
- In Olden Days (1952) - Primo cancelliere (segment "Il processo di Frine")
- Good Folk's Sunday (1953) - Il parroco
- Noi peccatori (1953) - Il collega vecchio
- Siamo tutti inquilini (1953) - Cavalier Terzetti
- Legione straniera (1953) - Gennaro
- Empty Eyes (1953) - Macaluso
- Easy Years (1953) - Veterano I guerra mondiale
- Verdi, the King of Melody (1953) - Impiegato del banco dei Pegni (uncredited)
- Condannatelo! (1953) - Simone
- A Day in Court (1954) - Il cancelliere
- Of Life and Love (1954) - Zi' Dima (segment "La giara")
- 100 Years of Love (1954) - The Veterinary Surgeon (segment "Garibaldina")
- A Slice of Life (1954) - (segment "Don Corradino")
- High School (1954) - Scandurra - Professore di Storia
- Schiava del peccato (1954) - Registrar Di Marco
- The Three Thieves (1954) - Leonardo da Vinci - the inventor
- It Happened at the Police Station (1954) - Cannizzaro, the old man
- Le signorine dello 04 (1955) - Cavaliere
- Scuola elementare (1955) - Salvatore Serafini
- The Art of Getting Along (1955) - Prisoner (uncredited)
- Buonanotte... avvocato! (1955) - Bianca Maria's Grandpa
- Bella non piangere (1955) - Il ragonier Parisi
- New Moon (1955) - Domenico
- Accadde al penitenziario (1955) - Un detenuto
- La moglie è uguale per tutti (1955) - Beretta
- Bravissimo (1955) - Arturo Pandolfino
- Roman Tales (1955) - The Bespectacled Customer at Barber's (uncredited)
- Allow Me, Daddy! (1956) - Il nonno Giovanni
- I calunniatori (1956) - Nonno di Dorina
- I pinguini ci guardano (1956)
- Arrivano i dollari! (1957) - The Butler
- Lazzarella (1957) - Professor Avallone
- Legs of Gold (1958) - Sindaco
- Three Strangers in Rome (1958) - Turiddu, forester
- Arriva la banda (1959)
- Howlers in the Dock (1960) - Il senatore Bucci
