= The Vow (1950 film) =

1950 film directed by Mario Bonnard

- Directed by: Mario Bonnard
- Written by: Mario Bonnard
- Based on: The Vow; 188 play by Salvatore Di Giacomo
- Produced by: Angelo Iacono
- Starring: Doris Duranti; Giorgio De Lullo; Maria Grazia Francia
- Cinematography: Tonino Delli Colli
- Edited by: Gino Talamo
- Music by: Giulio Bonnard
- Production company: Ara Film
- Distributed by: Indipendenti Regionali
- Release date: 30 September 1950
- Running time: 94 minutes
- Country: Italy
- Language: Italian

The Vow (Italian: Il voto) is a 1950 Italian melodrama film directed by Mario Bonnard and starring Doris Duranti, Giorgio De Lullo and Maria Grazia Francia. It is based on a play of the same title by Salvatore Di Giacomo. Future star Sophia Loren played a small, uncredited role. It was shot at the Scalera Studios in Rome. The film's sets were designed by the art director Piero Filippone.

== Plot ==
During the absence of her husband, who left for a fishing cruise in the seas of China, Carmela falls under the spell of Vito, a young fisherman.

== Cast ==
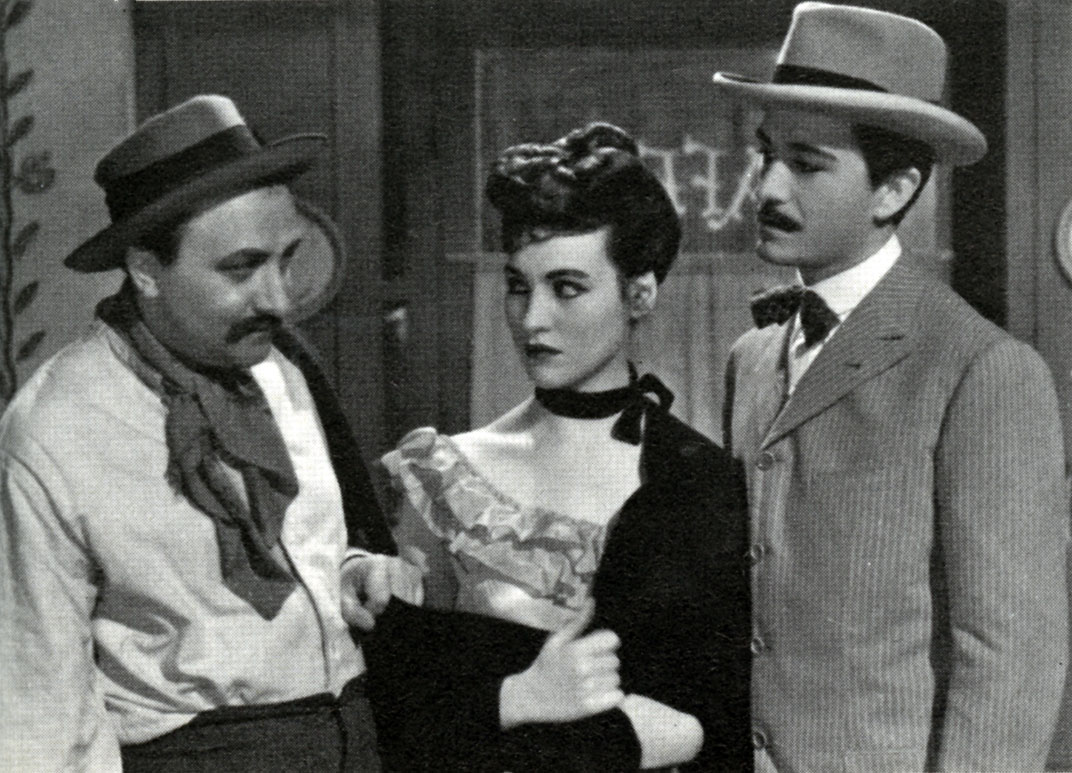
Scene from the film with Maria Grazia Francia.

- Doris Duranti as Carmela
- Giorgio De Lullo as Vito
- Maria Grazia Francia as Cristina
- Roberto Murolo as Gennaro
- Enrico Glori as Lo sfruttatore
- Bella Starace Sainati as Donna Rosa
- Leopoldo Valenti as Pasquale
- Liana Billi as Nunziata
- Lia Thomas as Assunta
- Agnese Dubbini as Amalia
- Armando Guarnieri as Il brigadiere
- Arturo Stefanelli as Il barbiere
- Arturo Gigliati as L'acquaiolo
- Maria Perrella as Donna Concetta
- Tina Pica as La maligna
- Sophia Loren as A commoner at the Piedigrotta festival

== Bibliography ==
- Chiti, Roberto & Poppi, Roberto. Dizionario del cinema italiano: Dal 1945 al 1959. Gremese Editore, 1991.
- Goble, Alan. The Complete Index to Literary Sources in Film. Walter de Gruyter, 1999.
