= Verdi, the King of Melody =

1953 film

- Spanish film poster
- Directed by: Raffaello Matarazzo
- Cinematography: Tino Santoni
- Edited by: Mario Serandrei
- Music by: Giuseppe Verdi
- Release date: 22 December 1953
- Country: Italy
- Language: Italian

Giuseppe Verdi, released theatrically in the US as The Life and Music of Giuseppe Verdi and on video as Verdi, the King of Melody, is a 1953 Italian biographical musical melodrama film starring Pierre Cressoy and directed by Raffaello Matarazzo. It is based on adult life events of the composer Giuseppe Verdi. The film was a commercial success, grossing over 957 million lire at the Italian box office.

== Cast ==
- Pierre Cressoy as Giuseppe Verdi
- Anna Maria Ferrero as Margherita Barezzi
- Gaby André as Giuseppina Strepponi
- Irene Genna as Violetta
- Laura Gore as Berberina Strepponi
- Camillo Pilotto as Antonio Barezzi
- Emilio Cigoli as Gaetano Donizetti
- Loris Gizzi as Gioachino Rossini
- Mario Del Monaco as Francesco Tamagno
- Tito Gobbi as Domenico Ronconi
- Aldo Bufi Landi as Alexandre Dumas, fils
- Guido Celano as Victor Hugo
- Franca Dominici as Rossini's Wife
- Mario Ferrari as Austrian Official
- Enrico Glori as Stage Director
- Turi Pandolfini as Bank Teller
- Teresa Franchini as Old Lady
- Gianni Agus
- Olga Vittoria Gentili
- Liana Del Balzo
- Lola Braccini
- Anna Vivaldi
- Lucia Banti
