= The Red and the Black (1954 film) =

French-Italian historical drama film

- theatrical poster
- Directed by: Claude Autant-Lara
- Screenplay by: Jean Aurenche; Pierre Bost; Claude Autant-Lara
- Produced by: Henry Deutschmeister; Gianni Hecht Lucari
- Cinematography: Michel Kelber
- Edited by: Madeleine Gug
- Music by: René Cloërec
- Production companies: Franco London Films; Documento Film
- Distributed by: Gaumont Distribution (France); CEI-Incom (Italy)
- Release dates: 29 October 1954 (France); 8 April 1958 (USA)
- Running time: 113–185 minutes
- Countries: France; Italy
- Language: French
- Box office: 4,344,414 admissions (France)

The Red and the Black (French: Le rouge et le noir) is a 1954 French-Italian historical drama film directed by Claude Autant-Lara, who co-wrote the screenplay with Jean Aurenche and Pierre Bost, based on the novel The Red and the Black by Stendhal. The film starred Gérard Philipe, Antonella Lualdi and Danielle Darrieux, and won the French Syndicate of Cinema Critics award for the best film of 1955 and the Grand Prix de l'Académie du Cinéma the same year.

It was shot the Saint-Maurice Studios in Paris. The film's sets were designed by the art director Max Douy.

Shown in various versions, the film's length is generally given as 113 minutes. In Canada it was 171 minutes; a longer version in France was 185 minutes（or 194 minutes in 2 parts); and at its New York opening it was 137 minutes.

== Cast ==
- Gérard Philipe as Julien Sorel
- Danielle Darrieux as Madame de Rénal
- Antonella Lualdi as Mathilde de la Mole
- Jean Mercure as Marchese de la Môle
- Jean Martinelli as Monsieur de Rénal
- Antoine Balpêtré as Abate Pirard
- Anna Maria Sandri as Elisa
- Mirko Ellis as Norbert de la Môle
- Pierre Jourdan as Comte Altamira
- Jean Mercure as Marquis de La Mole
- Alexandre Rignault as Le père Sorel
- Gérard Séty as Le lieutenant Liéven
- Jacques Varennes as Le président du tribunal
- Claude Sylvain as Amanda Binet
