= Love and Troubles =

1958 film

- Film poster
- Directed by: Angelo Dorigo
- Written by: Lianella Carell; Nino Lillo; Amedeo Marrosu; Roberto Natale; Giorgio Stegani
- Produced by: Angelo Dorigo
- Starring: Marcello Mastroianni
- Cinematography: Giuseppe Aquari; Mario Bernardo
- Edited by: Mariano Arditi
- Music by: Carlo Innocenzi
- Release date: 1958
- Running time: 87 minutes
- Country: Italy
- Language: Italian

Love and Troubles (Italian: Amore e guai) is a 1958 Italian comedy film directed by Angelo Dorigo.

== Plot ==
A Don Juan named Roberto woos a young actress of photo novels on the day she is expected to be engaged to the woman he loves, despite the opposition of her family.

Franco, a train attendant, secretly lets her girlfriend, her telephone operator, get on it to be able to see her despite their working hours which do not coincide.

Finally, an ex-prisoner, Paolo, is looking for a job to be able to marry his girlfriend Marisa, whom a trauma has made mute.

== Cast ==
- Marcello Mastroianni - Franco
- Richard Basehart - Paolo Martelli
- Valentina Cortese - Marisa
- Maurizio Arena - Roberto
- Eloisa Cianni - Teresa
- Irène Galter - Lisa
- Umberto Spadaro - Antonio
- Checco Durante - Virgilio Santucci
- Nino Musco - Padre di Teresa
- Silvio Bagolini - Collega di Franco
- Andrea Aureli - Ivo
- Luigi Tosi - Capocantiere
- Liana Ferri - Madre di Teresa e Ivo
- Emma Baron - Signora Renata (as Emma Baron Cerlesi)
- Mario Passante - Un viaggiatore
