= Captain Phantom =

1953 Italian film by Primo Zeglio

- Directed by: Primo Zeglio
- Written by: Furio Scarpelli; Agenore Incrocci; Gino De Santis; Primo Zeglio
- Produced by: Luigi Carpentieri; Ermanno Donati
- Starring: Frank Latimore; Anna Maria Sandri; Maxwell Reed; Paola Barbara
- Cinematography: Carlo Carlini
- Edited by: Mario Serandrei
- Music by: Carlo Rustichelli
- Production company: Athena Cinematografica
- Distributed by: Rank Film
- Release date: 11 November 1953
- Running time: 86 minutes
- Country: Italy
- Language: Italian

Captain Phantom (Italian: Capitan Fantasma) is a 1953 Italian historical adventure film directed by Primo Zeglio and starring Frank Latimore, Anna Maria Sandri, Maxwell Reed and Paola Barbara. It was shot at the Cinecittà Studios in Rome. The film's sets were designed by the art director Alberto Boccianti. It was distributed by the Italian subsidiary of the Rank Organisation.

== Plot ==
In the early 1800s, the Spanish regiments are celebrating their victory over the French Legions of Bonaparte. In the midst of the celebration, Miguel, Duke of Canabil, is summoned to his commander's quarters and given the news that his father, and Admiral in the Spanish Navy, has betrayed the crown of Spain by turning his fleet over to the enemy. The stunned Miguel, humiliated and scorned by his regiment, takes a blood oath to find out the truth about his father. His search leads him to the mystery ship "Asuncion", commanded by Ingio de Costa, an unscrupulous, vicious man with a hand for evil. The latter is also trying to get one of his evil hands on the fair Consuelo, daughter of the governor of Cadiz.

== Cast ==
- Frank Latimore as Captain Miguel
- Maxwell Reed as Don Inigo da Costa
- Anna Maria Sandri as Consuelo
- Paola Barbara as Soledad
- Katyna Ranieri as Amparo
- Tino Buazzelli as Damian Pinto
- Juan de Landa as Carlos
- Sergio Fantoni as Officer in second
- Mario Carotenuto as Sailor
- Gianni Cavalieri as The Doctor
- Sergio Fantoni as Lieutenant Nebbia
- Fedele Gentile as Sandoval
- Carlo Tamberlani as The Colonel
- Cesare Fantoni as The Admiral in Havana
- Mario Feliciani as The Sailor Feliciano
- Aldo Giuffrè as Moreno
- Carlo Lombardi as The Admiral in A Coruña
- Franco Marturano as Don Ferrante de Ávila
- Franco Pastorino as The young Sailor
- Nico Pepe as The bearded Officer
- Edoardo Toniolo as Captain of the 'Anita Lopez'
