= Gaby André =

French actress (1920–1972)

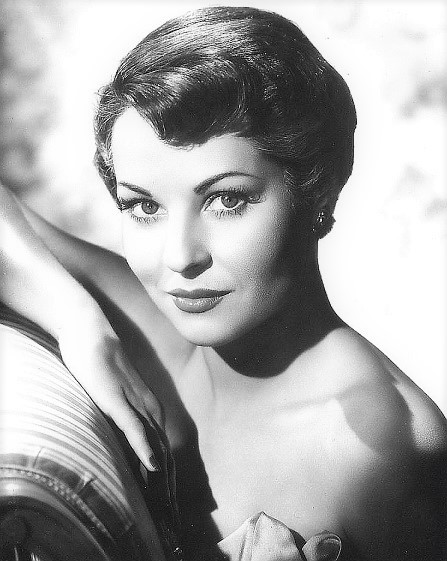
- Gaby André (c. 1950)
- Born: 5 March 1920; Châlons-en-Champagne, Marne, France
- Died: 27 August 1972 (aged 52); Rome, Lazio, Italy
- Other name: Gabrielle Louise Mathilde Andreu
- Occupation: Actress
- Years active: 1936–1970 (film)

Gaby André (born Gabrielle Louise Mathilde Andreu; March 5, 1920 – August 27, 1972) was a French film actress known for her roles in films like "La vendetta di Ercole" (1960) and "Highway 301" (1950).

She died of cancer at the young age of 52 and was laid to rest in the only cemetery that could attempt to match her beauty, the Non-Catholic Cemetery, Rome, Italy.

Inscribed on the tombstone are the words:

“If you should think of me smile to the next person you see”

== Partial filmography ==
- Hélène (1936)
- The Man of the Hour (1937)
- La plus belle fille du monde (1938)
- The Shanghai Drama (1938) - Une amie de Véra (uncredited)
- The Curtain Rises (1938) - Mireille, une élève du Conservatoire
- The Foolish Virgin (1938)
- J'étais une aventurière (1938) - (uncredited)
- The White Slave (1939) - Une femme du harem (uncredited)
- Fort Dolorès (1939)
- The End of the Day (1939) - Danielle
- Paradise Lost (1940) - Irène (uncredited)
- The Mondesir Heir (1940) - Janine Richard - La postière
- Strange Suzy (1941) - Aline
- Parade en sept nuits (1941) - Estelle - la fille-mère
- Cartacalha, reine des gitans (1942) - Piribichi
- La Maison des sept jeunes filles (1942) - Rolande
- Départ à zéro (1943) - Stella
- The Exile's Song (1943) - Maria
- Adémaï bandit d'honneur (1943) - Fortunata
- Un seul amour (1943) - Sophie de La Tournelle
- The Angel of the Night (1944) - Simone
- 120, rue de la Gare (1946) - Suzanne Parmentier
- Les Gueux au Paradis (1946) - Marie
- Monsieur Grégoire Escapes (1946) - Colette
- Une femme coupée en morceaux (1946)
- Please Believe Me (1950) - Mme. Carnet
- Highway 301 (1950) - Lee Fontaine
- The Sleepwalker (1951) - Stella Gazzini, la vedette à Tabarin
- The Green Glove (1952) - Gaby Saunders
- Guilt Is Not Mine (1952) - Anna Valli
- The Angel of Sin (1952) - Elena
- Verdi, the King of Melody (1953) - Giuseppina Strepponi
- Siamo ricchi e poveri (1953) - Jacqueline - the French singer
- Prima di sera (1954) - Bancani's Wife
- La campana di San Giusto (1954) - Cinzia Di Rionero - sua moglie
- Tua per la vita (1955) - Marisa Marini
- Donatella (1956) - (uncredited)
- Una voce, una chitarra, un po' di luna (1956) - Sandra Luciani - Moglie di Alberto
- East of Kilimanjaro (1957) - Dr. Marie Avedon
- Cosmic Monsters (1958) - Michele Dupont
- Incognito (1958) - Hilda Porenson
- Goliath and the Dragon (1960) - Ismene
- Duel at the Rio Grande (1963) - Señora Gutiérrez
- Natika (1963)
- Togli le gambe dal parabrezza (1969)
- Pussycat, Pussycat, I Love You (1970) - Flavia
- La torta in cielo (1973) - (final film role)

== Bibliography ==
- Mitchell, Charles P. The Great Composers Portrayed on Film, 1913 through 2002. McFarland, 2004.
