= Mario Bernardo =

Italian cinematographer (1919–2019)

- Born: 22 February 1919; Venice, Italy
- Died: 10 February 2019 (aged 99); Bieno, Italy
- Occupation: Cinematographer

Mario Bernardo (22 February 1919 – 10 February 2019) was an Italian cinematographer and former partisan.

== Biography ==
A member of the Alpini corps in South Tyrol, Bernardo came back to his parents' house in Bieno and joined the partisan Gramsci Brigade after the Armistice of Cassibile, fighting the nazi fascists on the Dolomites under the name of Radiosa Aurora (Radiant Aurora) as a member of the Italian Communist Party.

After the end of World War II, Bernardo became chief of the Police in Trento, contributing to the foundation of the Trento's division of National Association of Italian Partisans.

Bernardo left his office in Trento and went to Rome where he began to work as cinematographer and became a close collaborator of Pier Paolo Pasolini and became a friend of Totò. In Rome, he also taught Shooting Techniques at the Experimental Film Centre.

In 2003, Bernardo returned to Bieno, where he lived until his death on 10 February 2019, twelve days before his 100th birthday.

== Partial filmography ==
- Love and Troubles (1958)
- Ro.Go.Pa.G. (1963)
- Love Meetings (1965)
- The Hawks and the Sparrows (1966)
