= Anna Maria Sandri =

Italian actress (born 1936)

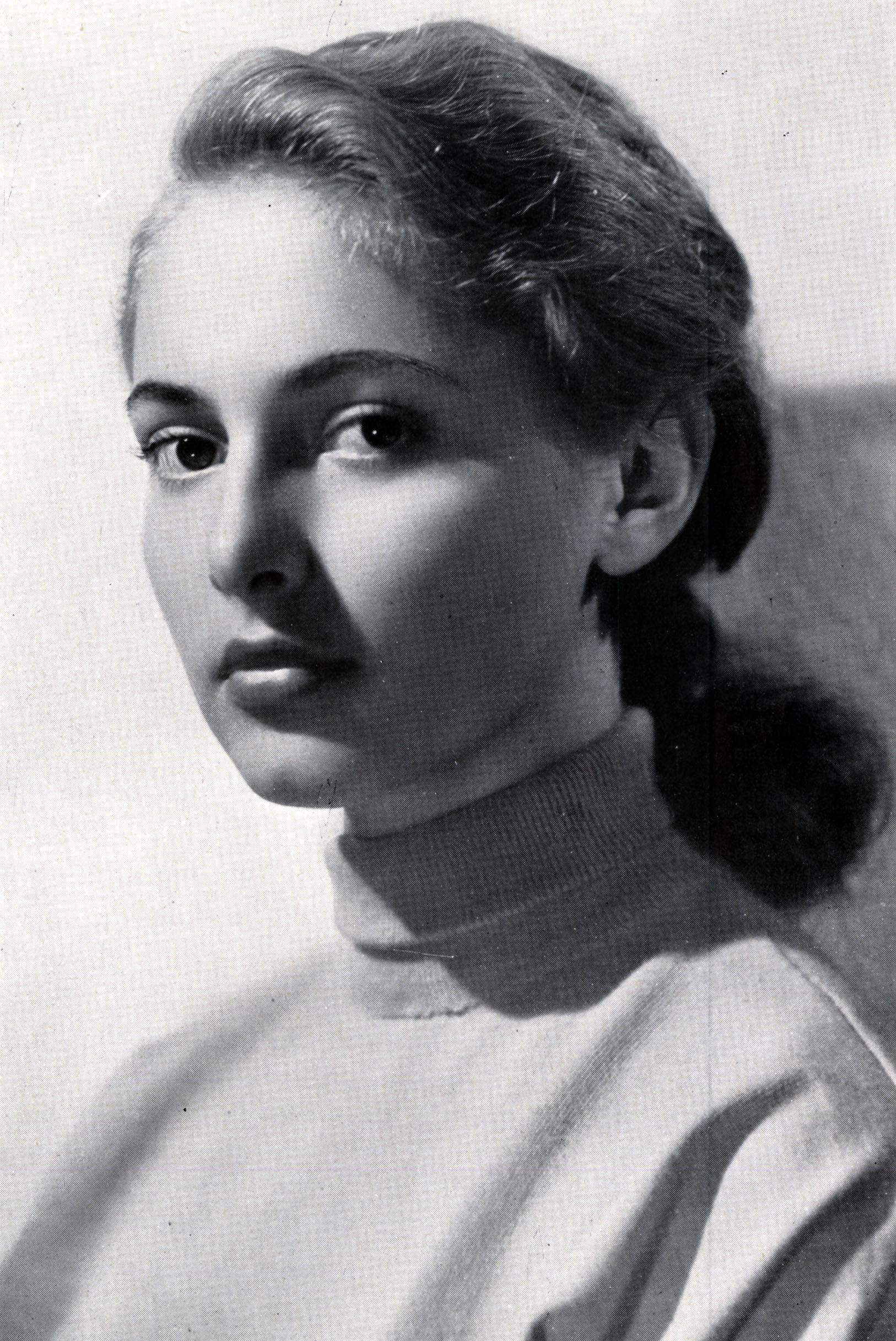
- Born: Anna Maria Materzanini; 10 August 1936 (age 90); Rome, Italy
- Known for: Actress
- Notable work: The Black Tent (1956)
- Spouse: Edward Gaylord
- Children: 3

Anna Maria Sandri (born 10 August 1936) is an Italian actress whose film career spanned the 1940s and 1950s. She is notable for her portrayal of Mabrouka ben Yussef in The Black Tent (1956).

== Early life and career ==
Anna Maria Materzanini was born on 10 August 1936 in Rome. She made her on-screen debut at six years of age in the 1942 film La morte civile, directed by Ferdinando Maria Poggioli, playing the young Ada.

Sandri returned to the screen in 1952 in Raffaello Matarazzo's melodrama Chi è senza peccato... (1952). Her most prominent roles followed between 1953 and 1956: La provinciale (1953), Terza liceo (1954), Le Rouge et le Noir (1954), Fortune carrée (1955) and The Black Tent (1956), directed by Brian Desmond Hurst, portraying Mabrouka ben Yussef. She retired from acting at the end of the 1950s.

== Personal life ==
Sandri was married to billionaire and Gaylord Hotels founder Edward Gaylord. They had three sons. She lives in San Diego, California.

== Filmography ==
- La morte civile (1942)
- Who is Without Sin (1952)
- Captain Phantom (1953)
- High School (1954)
- The Red and the Black (1954)
- Square Fortune (1955)
- The Black Tent (1956)
