= Toto in the Moon =

Totò nella luna
- Directed by: Steno
- Written by: Steno; Lucio Fulci; Ettore Scola; Sandro Continenza
- Produced by: Mario Cecchi Gori
- Starring: Totò; Sylva Koscina; Ugo Tognazzi
- Cinematography: Marco Scarpelli
- Edited by: Giuliana Martelli
- Music by: Alessandro Derevitsky
- Distributed by: Cecchi Gori Group
- Release date: 1958
- Running time: 95 min
- Country: Italy
- Language: Italian

Totò nella luna (internationally released as Toto in the Moon) is a 1958 Italian comedy science fiction film written and directed by Steno. The script was co-written by Lucio Fulci. The film starred Sylva Koscina, fresh from her appearance in the 1958 blockbuster Hercules.

== Plot ==
Achilles Paoloni, a delivery boy employed by Soubrette, a small publishing house owned by cavaliere (Knight) Pasquale Belafronte (Totò), writes a science fiction novel that he hopes in vain to publish with the help of the cavaliere, who is hostile to him.

Concurrently, U.S. scientists find out that Achilles has a substance in the blood, glumonium, derived from being fed monkey breast milk as a newborn, that makes him suitable for spaceflight. When two FBI agents are sent to the office to recruit Achilles for a space mission, he mistakes them for publishers interested in his novel for international distribution. Cavalier Pasquale becomes aware of this situation and has a complete about-face, ending years of insults and hostility towards the poor Achilles. He pushes hard to publishing the novel at his own expense, even agreeing to the marriage between the young man and his daughter Lydia. Soon, however, he realizes that it was a mistake: the U.S. does not want to launch "The Rocket in Space" novel, but a real rocket, with the young man himself, for a moon landing. However, Achilles is also being sought by the envoys of a mysterious foreign power, the German rocket scientist Von Braut and the beautiful spy Tatiana.

The plans of the two rival powers are hampered by strange aliens (the Annelids) who send down to Earth two "cosoni", identical copies of Pasquale and Achilles, in order for the copies to be shipped on the moon (in a parody of Invasion of the Body Snatchers) and make the human's mission fail, because preventing the human conquest of space will preserve the peaceful balance among aliens. The Germans kidnap the real Pasquale and Achille's replica, hibernate them, and ship them to space in a rocket, but lose control of the rocket. The Anellids save the day and land the rocket on the moon.

One of the Anellids reveals itself to Pasquale, who demands to be taken back, worrying about his family. The Anellid shows Pasquale that the real Achille has become a successful science fiction writer and has a family with Lidia, and that nobody misses Pasquale since his "cosone" is replacing him well, to the point of courting his maid like he did. Exiled on the moon, Pasquale succeeds in convincing the Anellid to transform Achille's "cosone" into a beautiful woman.

== Cast ==
- Totò: Pasquale Belafronte
- Sylva Koscina: Lidia
- Ugo Tognazzi: Achille
- Sandra Milo: Tatiana
- Luciano Salce: Von Braut
- Giacomo Furia: commendator Santoni
- Jim Dolen: O'Connor
- Francesco Mulé: il vigile urbano
- Marco Tulli: un creditore

== Release ==
Toto nella luna released on November 28, 1958.
