= Anna Carena =

Italian actress

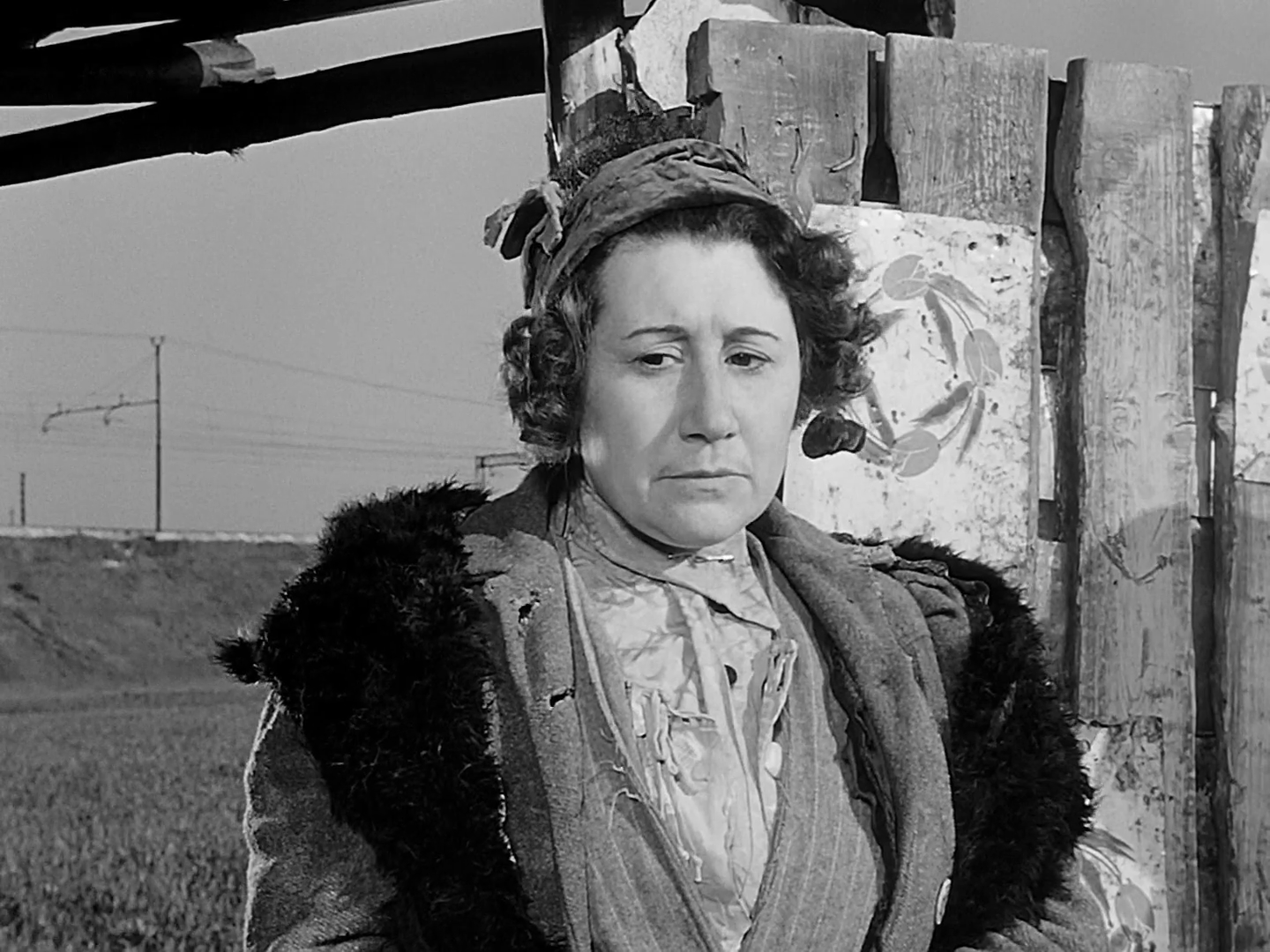
- Carena in Miracle in Milan (1951)
- Born: 30 January 1899; Milan, Kingdom of Italy
- Died: 15 April 1988 (aged 89); Milan, Italy
- Occupation: Actress
- Years active: 1941–1983

Anna Carena (born Giuseppina Galimberti; 30 January 1899 – 15 April 1990) was an Italian actress. She appeared in more than thirty films from 1941 to 1983.

== Life and career ==
Born in Milan, in 1924 Galimberti started her career on stage in the theatrical company of Annibale Betrone. After being part of a number of companies, in 1931 she adopted her stage name and became primadonna of the Dialect Company of the Teatro Principe in her hometown. In 1933, she founded her own company, specialized in Milanese dialect plays. In the 1930s she started collaborating with EIAR, and after the war she entered the stage company of Annibale Ninchi.

Carena made her film debut in 1941, and specialized in character roles. In films, she is best known for the role of Argia in Alberto Lattuada's The Mill on the Po, and for the role of Marta in Vittorio De Sica's Miracle in Milan. In 1952, she had a personal success with the stage play Cinquant'anni sul goeubb. She died on 15 April 1988, at the age of 89.

== Filmography ==
Year	Title	Role	Notes
1941	The Jester's Supper		
1941	Piccolo mondo antico	Carlotta, la cameriera della marchesa	
1941	La fuggitiva	La signora Tilde	
1942	The Jester's Supper	La moglie del taverniere	Uncredited
1942	Yes, Madam	La suora caposala	
1942	Signorinette		
1942	Nothing New Tonight	La lavandaia	
1942	Four Steps in the Clouds	La maestra sulla corriera	
1942	La fanciulla dell'altra riva	Herta, l'infermiera	
1943	Principessina		
1943	Sempre più difficile	Stella D'Azevegno	
1943	Sant'Elena, piccola isola	La dama di compania di Letizia Bonaparte	
1947	Vanity	Vicina di casa	
1949	The Mill on the Po	L'Argia	
1951	Miracle in Milan	Marta, la signora altezzosa	
1951	Ha fatto tredici		
1952	The Mistress of Treves		
1952	The Overcoat	L'affittacamere	
1952	In Olden Days	Teresa	(segment "L'idillio"), Uncredited
1952	Toto and the King of Rome	Armida Pappalardo	
1953	The Lady Without Camelias	Clara Manni's Mother	
1953	Siamo tutti Milanesi	La Marchesa	
1953	Café chantant	Contessa Gerza	
1954	If You Won a Hundred Million	La moglie di Ambrogio	(segment "Il tifoso")
1955	L'ultimo amante	La portinaia	Uncredited
1956	Lucky to Be a Woman	Miliardaria brasiliana	
1963	The Teacher from Vigevano	Drivaldi	
1970	Sunflower	La madre di Antonio	
1972	White Sister		
1973	A Brief Vacation	The mother in law	
