= Mario Volpe (director) =

Italian actor (1894–1968)

- Born: 18 March 1894; Naples, Campania, Kingdom of Italy
- Died: 1968 (aged 73–74); Rome, Lazio, Italy
- Occupations: Director, Cinematographer
- Years active: 1914-1968 (film)

Mario Volpe (1894–1968) was an Italian film director.

== Selected filmography ==
- The Cry of the Eagle (1923)
- New Moon (1925)
- The Song of the Heart (1932)
- The Two Sisters (1950)
- Papà ti ricordo (1952)

== Bibliography ==
- Brunetta, Gian Piero. The History of Italian Cinema: A Guide to Italian Film from Its Origins to the Twenty-first Century. Princeton University Press, 2009.
