= High School (1954 film) =

1954 film

- Directed by: Luciano Emmer
- Written by: Sergio Amidei; Carlo Bernari; Vasco Pratolini; Luciano Emmer
- Produced by: Giorgio Agliani
- Starring: Christine Carère; Isabella Redi; Giulia Rubini; Anna Maria Sandri
- Cinematography: Mario Bava
- Edited by: Eraldo Da Roma
- Music by: Carlo Innocenzi
- Release date: 1954
- Country: Italy
- Language: Italian

High School (Italian: Terza liceo) is a 1954 Italian coming-of-age comedy-drama film directed by Luciano Emmer.

== Plot ==
Last year of school for the III C of the Gobetti high school in Rome: the events of the boys and girls who have to face the final exams are intertwined with more or less happy loves, shy disputes and small dramas. Lucia, scion of a rich family, but with a generous and rebellious soul, shares with Andrea, who instead comes from a family of modest conditions, the project for a school newspaper. The contents of the file put them in collision with the principal, but they unite the two youngsters, who eventually fall in love. Their relationship, however, is opposed by Lucia's family, who want her to be paired with the stolid but rich Pupo.

== Cast ==
- Giulia Rubini: Camilla
- Ilaria Occhini: Isabella
- Anna Maria Sandri: Teresa
- Ugo Amaldi: Franco
- Ferdinando Cappabianca: Andrea
- Franco Santori: Bruno
- Paola Borboni: Mother of Bruno
- Bartolomeo Rossetti: Valenti
- Antonio Battistella: Father of Giulia
- Eriprando Visconti: Carlo
- Marcella Rovena: Mother of Camilla
- Turi Pandolfini: Professor
- Giuliano Montaldo: Professor
- Carlo Bernari: Professor
- Christine Carère: Giovanna
- Valeria Moriconi
- Rita Livesi
