= Luigi Tosi =

Italian actor

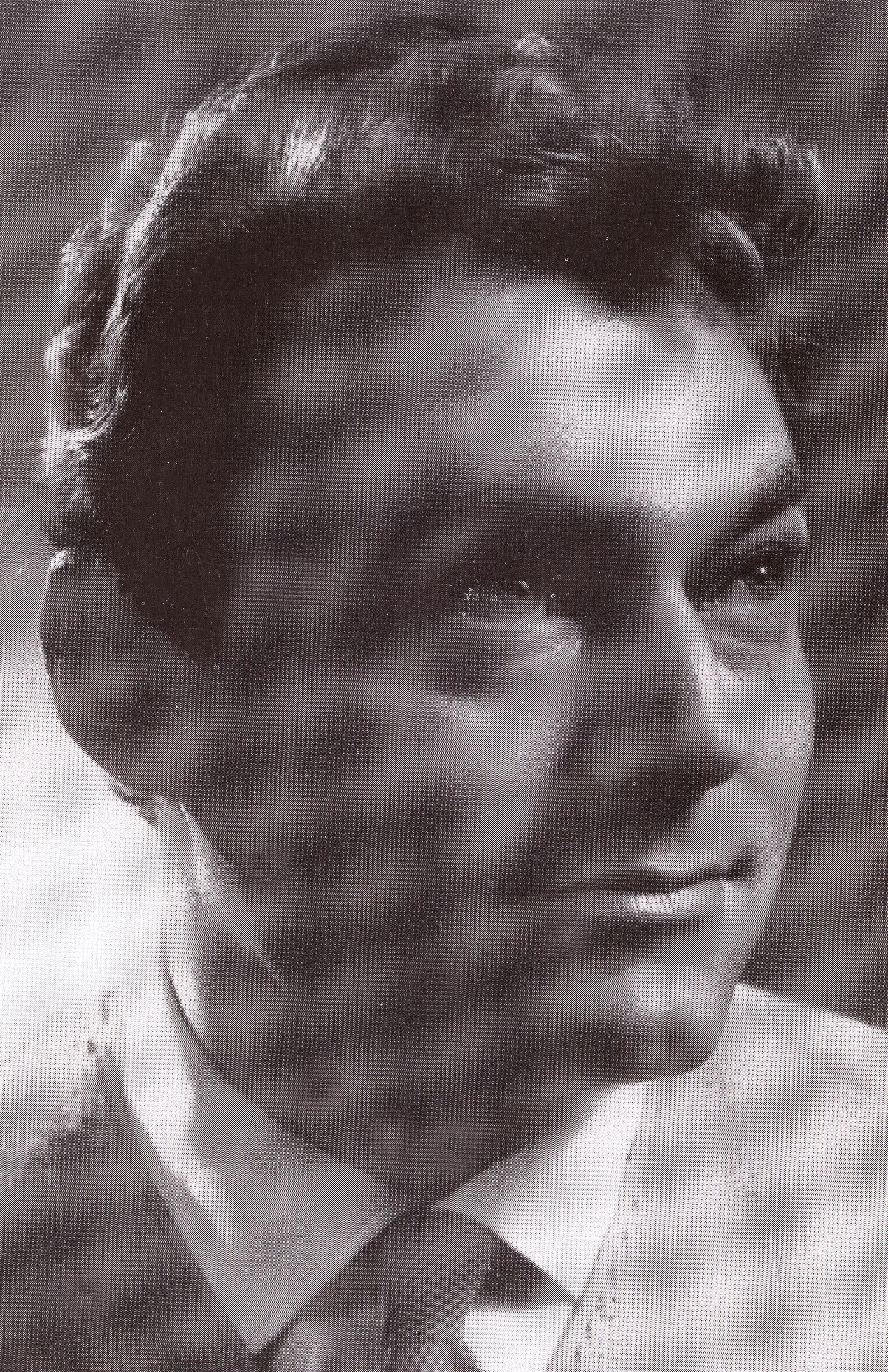
- Tosi in 1954
- Born: 15 July 1915; Verona, Italy
- Died: 12 March 1989 (aged 73); Rome, Italy
- Occupation: Actor
- Years active: 1944–1965

Luigi Tosi (15 July 1915 – 12 March 1989) was an Italian actor. He appeared in more than seventy films from 1944 to 1965.

== Filmography ==
Year	Title	Role	Notes
1944	Rosalba		
1944	Fiori d'arancio	Ing. Raimondo Alberti	
1945	Casello N. 3		
1946	Pian delle stelle		
1947	L'apocalisse		
1947	Tombolo, paradiso nero	Renzo	
1947	Il principe ribelle		
1948	Legge di sangue	Antonio	
1949	The Earth Cries Out	David Taumen	
1949	City of Pain	Berto	
1949	Fiamma che non si spegne	Giovanni	
1950	Captain Demonio	Il bargello	
1950	Pact with the Devil	Rocco	
1950	Gente così		
1950	Atoll K	Le lieutenant Jack Frazer	
1950	The Thief of Venice	Mario	
1951	The Forbidden Christ	Andrea	
1951	La grande rinuncia		
1951	Era lui... sì! sì!	Rinaldo	
1952	Gli uomini non guardano il cielo	Don Battista Paolin	
1952	Solo per te Lucia	Mario Neri	
1952	Papà ti ricordo		
1952	The Angel of Sin	Bruno	
1953	I Piombi di Venezia	Captain	
1953	It's Never Too Late	Daniele Trabbi	
1953	The Pagans	Benvenuto Cellini	
1953	Traviata '53	Il medico	Uncredited
1953	François il contrabbandiere	Topo	
1953	The Ship of Condemned Women	Fernandez, the Ship's Captain	
1953	The Treasure of Bengal	Don Fernando	
1953	Il bacio dell'Aurora		
1954	Mystery of the Black Jungle	Captain MacPherson	
1954	Mid-Century Loves	Count Edoardo Savelli	(segment "L'amore romantico")
1954	Public Opinion	Attilio	
1954	La vendetta dei Tughs	Captain McPherson	
1954	Il cavaliere di Maison Rouge	Cordonnier	
1954	The King's Prisoner	Carcan	
1954	Avanzi di galera		
1954	La Luciana	Mario Coppola	
1954	Loves of Three Queens		(Segment: The Face That Launched a Thousand Ships), Uncredited
1954	A Free Woman	Michele	
1954	The Lovers of Manon Lescaut		
1954	Casta Diva	Felice Romani	
1955	Amici per la pelle	Il padre di Mario	
1955	Don Camillo's Last Round	Judge	
1955	Il piccolo vetraio	padre di Piero	
1956	Altair	Comandante linea di volo	
1956	La trovatella di Milano		
1957	Io, Caterina		
1957	The Knight of the Black Sword	Barone Acquaviva	
1957	Miracles of Thursday	Hombre 1º	
1957	The Goddess of Love		
1957	Le avventure di Roby e Buck		
1957	Amarti è il mio destino	Don Giovanni	
1958	Il marito	Ernesto Pinardi	
1958	Si le roi savait ça		
1958	The Sky Burns	Maselli	
1958	Love and Troubles	Capocantiere	
1958	Captain Falcon		
1959	Head of a Tyrant	Irasa	
1959	Goliath and the Barbarians		
1959	The Pirate and the Slave Girl	Francisco the Castilian Painter	
1960	David and Goliath	Benjamin Di Gaba	
1960	Il terrore della maschera rossa	Martino	
1960	The Cossacks		Uncredited
1961	The Wonders of Aladdin		Uncredited
1964	Buffalo Bill, Hero of the Far West	Frank - Barman	Uncredited
1964	Ali Baba and the Seven Saracens	Meneth - Saracen Leader	
1964	Il vendicatore mascherato		
1965	Treasure of the Petrified Forest	Otto	Uncredited
1965	Blood for a Silver Dollar	Herrero	
1965	Latin Lovers		(segment "Il telefono consolatore")
1965	Operation Atlantis	Azul	(final film role)
