= Schiava del peccato =

1954 film

- Film poster
- Directed by: Raffaello Matarazzo
- Written by: Oreste Biancoli; Aldo De Benedetti
- Starring: Miranda Campa
- Cinematography: Elio Polacchi; Marco Scarpelli
- Edited by: Mario Serandrei
- Music by: Renzo Rossellini
- Release date: 8 May 1954
- Running time: 100 minutes
- Country: Italy
- Language: Italian

Schiava del peccato (Slave to Sin) is a 1954 Italian melodrama film directed by Raffaello Matarazzo.

== Cast ==
- Silvana Pampanini as Mara Gualtieri
- Marcello Mastroianni as Giulio
- Irene Genna as Dina
- Franco Fabrizi as Carlo
- Renato Vicario as Husband of Dina
- Camillo Pilotto as Inspector
- Liliana Gerace as Elena
- Olinto Cristina as Director
- Paul Muller as Voyager
- Dina Perbellini as Miss Cesira
- Maria Materzanini as Maria Grazia Sandri
- Maria Grazia Francia
- Irène Galter
- Laura Gore
- Turi Pandolfini
- Loris Gizzi
- Miranda Campa
- Giorgio Capecchi
- Adriana Danieli
- Mirella Di Lauri
- Franca Dominici
- Checco Durante
- Lia Lena
- Maria Grazia Monaci
- Aldo Pini
- Isarco Ravaioli
- Andreina Zani
