= Love Meetings =

Comizi d'amore -Love Meetings-
- Film poster
- Directed by: Pier Paolo Pasolini
- Written by: Pier Paolo Pasolini
- Produced by: Alfredo Bini
- Starring: Pier Paolo Pasolini; Alberto Moravia; Giuseppe Ungaretti
- Cinematography: Mario Bernardo; Tonino Delli Colli
- Edited by: Nino Baragli
- Release date: July 26, 1964 (Locarno Film Festival)
- Running time: 92 min
- Country: Italy
- Language: Italian

Love Meetings (Italian: Comizi d'amore) is a 1964 feature-length documentary, which was shot by Italian writer and director Pier Paolo Pasolini, who also acts as the interviewer, appearing in many of the film's scenes. It was premiered in Locarno Film Festival on 26 July 1964. In 2008, the film was included on the Italian Ministry of Cultural Heritage’s 100 Italian films to be saved, a list of 100 films that "have changed the collective memory of the country between 1942 and 1978."

== Content ==
Typical for him, Pasolini's subject is sex: he questions representatives from a variety of social brackets on topics such as virginity, prostitution, homosexuality and sex education. The interviews are made in Italy. The overarching themes include sexual ignorance, confusion and conservatism.

The film is divided into four large parts, called "Ricerche" (literally, "searches"), plus a brief prologue, in which Pasolini asks children in a poor area where babies come from (the responses include "flowers," "the stork," "Jesus and God," and "my uncle") and an epilogue, in which Pasolini recites one of his poems about marriage. Also included are conversations with acclaimed author and his friend, Alberto Moravia and psychologist Cesare Musatti, or with poet Giuseppe Ungaretti, Italian pop star Peppino di Capri, or with a group of three women journalists, including Oriana Fallaci.

== Structure ==
The film is divided into various parts depending on the topics covered or the various areas of Italy where the interviews were filmed.

=== First half ===
- Search 1 - Large Italian-style mixed fried food. Where we see a sort of traveling salesman who goes around Italy to survey Italians on their sexual tastes: not to launch a product, but with the most sincere intention of understanding and reporting faithfully.
  - How do Italians welcome the idea of films of this genre?
  - How do they behave when faced with the idea of the importance of sex in life?
- Search 2 - Disgust or pity?

=== Second half ===
- Search 3 - The real Italy?
  - Rallies on Roman beaches or sex as sex
  - Rallies on the beaches of Milan or sex as a hobby
  - Rallies on the southern beaches or sex as an honor
  - Rallies at the lido or sex as a success
  - Rallies on the (popular) Tuscan beaches or sex as pleasure
  - Rallies on the Tuscan beaches (bourgeois) or sex as a duty
- Search 4 - From below and from the depths

== Bibliography ==
- Pier Paolo Pasolini (2015). Comizi d'amore. Contrasto. ISBN 978-88-69-65617-0
