= Checco Durante =

Italian actor (1893–1976)

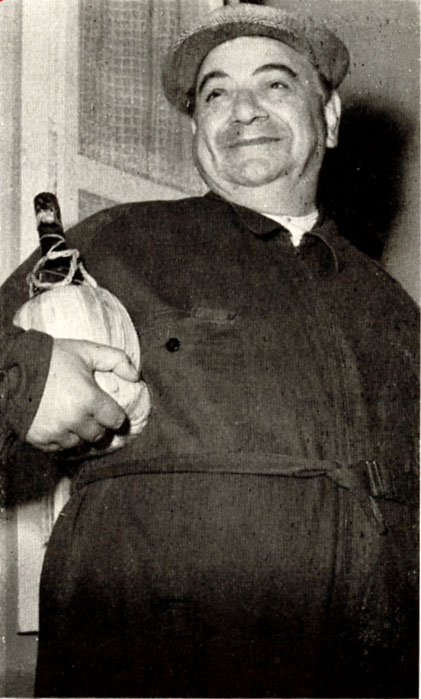
- Born: 19 November 1893; Rome, Kingdom of Italy
- Died: 5 January 1976 (aged 82); Rome, Italy
- Occupation: Actor
- Years active: 1931–1973
- Relatives: Francesco Prando (grandson)

Francesco "Checco" Durante (19 November 1893 – 5 January 1976) was an Italian film actor. He appeared in 59 films between 1931 and 1973.

== Selected filmography ==
- The Doctor in Spite of Himself (1931)
- The Amnesiac (1936) - L'allenatore Marinoni
- The Ferocious Saladin (1937) - Direttore del Teatro Vittoria
- The Castiglioni Brothers (1937) - L'oste
- I due barbieri (1937)
- The Black Corsair (1938) - Carmeau - Korsar
- Duetto vagabondo (1939)
- Il piccolo re (1939)
- La scuola dei timidi (1941)
- Perdizione (1942) - Il padrone dell'autorimessa
- The Taming of the Shrew (1942) - Il commendator Biondelli
- Don Juan (1942)
- Signorinette (1942) - Il padre di Iris
- Il treno crociato (1943) - Il capo cuoco (uncredited)
- L'innocente Casimiro (1945)
- Down with Misery (1945) - Il fattorino del radiogrammofono
- The Sun Still Rises (1946)
- Peddlin' in Society (1946) - Un frutivendolo
- Fury (1947) - Postman
- The Opium Den (1947) - Antonio, il finto cieco
- Il segreto di Don Giovanni (1947)
- Lo sciopero dei milioni (1947)
- L'isola di Montecristo (1948) - Faina
- The Street Has Many Dreams (1948) - Il parroco
- Twenty Years (1949)
- Santo disonore (1950) - Checco
- Variety Lights (1950) - Theater Owner
- The Two Sisters (1950) - Padron Cosimo
- Il nido di falasco (1950)
- Song of Spring (1951) - Pippo
- Verginità (1951) - Signor Corelli
- Auguri e figli maschi! (1951) - Ticket Inspector Antonio
- Rome-Paris-Rome (1951) - Meccanico
- Black Fire (1951)
- One Hundred Little Mothers (1952) - Il commissario
- Viva il cinema! (1952) - Ex Camera Operator
- Love and Poison (1952)
- Rome 11:00 (1952) - Padre di Adriana
- I figli non si vendono (1952) - Paolo Dazzeni
- Voice of Silence (1953) - Sacrestano
- The Return of Don Camillo (1953) - Il droghiere (uncredited)
- Easy Years (1953) - Usciere
- Angels of Darkness (1954) - Another relative of Francesco's
- Schiava del peccato (1954) - A Friend of Carlo
- The Last Race (1954)
- Il porto della speranza (1954)
- The Courier of Moncenisio (1954)
- If You Won a Hundred Million (1954) - Giovanni (segment "Il promesso... sposato")
- Accadde tra le sbarre (1955) - Pallotta - The thief
- La moglie è uguale per tutti (1955) - The Innkeeper
- Processo all'amore (1955) - Checco Mariani
- Motivo in maschera (1955)
- I dritti (1957) - Sor Cesare, padre di Aldo
- Love and Troubles (1958) - Virgilio Santucci
- Policarpo (1959) - Mario Marchetti's Father
- Adio Granada! (1967) - Sor Memmo
- Torture Me But Kill Me with Kisses (1968) - Direttore dell'agenzia camerieri
- Nel giorno del signore (1970) - fornaio Bragone
- In nome del popolo italiano (1971) - Archivista Pironti
- Buona parte di Paolina (1973)
