= Ha fatto tredici =

1951 Italian film by Carlo Manzoni

- Directed by: Carlo Manzoni
- Starring: Carlo Croccolo
- Cinematography: Mario Craveri; Arturo Gallea
- Music by: Giovanni Fusco
- Release date: 1951
- Country: Italy
- Language: Italian

Ha fatto tredici is a 1951 Italian comedy film directed by Carlo Manzoni.

== Cast ==
- Carlo Croccolo as Mario Rossi
- Riccardo Billi as himself
- Mario Riva as himself
- Antonella Lualdi as Mirella
- Virgilio Riento as Cav. Brusaglia
- Nyta Dover
- Giulio Stival as Direttore dell'hotel
- Nerio Bernardi
- Anna Carena
- Beniamino Maggio as Fattorino dell'hotel
- Silvana Pampanini
- Camillo Pilotto
- Franca Rame
- Marco Tulli
