= Casta Diva (1954 film) =

1954 Italian–French biographical melodrama film

- Directed by: Carmine Gallone
- Written by: Luigi Filippo D'Amico; Carmine Gallone; Léo Joannon; Walter Reisch; Age & Scarpelli
- Starring: Antonella Lualdi; Nadia Gray; Maurice Ronet
- Cinematography: Marco Scarpelli
- Edited by: Niccolò Lazzari
- Production companies: Documento Film; Franco London Films; Le Louvre Film
- Distributed by: Diana Cinematografica
- Release date: 1954
- Running time: 98 minutes
- Countries: France; Italy
- Language: Italian

Casta Diva is a 1954 Italian-French biographical melodrama film directed by Carmine Gallone. It is a remake of Gallone's 1935 film with the same name.

== Plot ==
The film tells the fictionalized biography of the famous musician Vincenzo Bellini, who lived in the 19th century and died at the age of 34.

== Cast ==
- Antonella Lualdi as Maddalena Fumaroli
- Nadia Gray as Giuditta Pasta
- Maurice Ronet as Vincenzo Bellini
- Fausto Tozzi as Gaetano Donizetti
- Jacques Castelot as Ernesto Tosi
- Marina Berti as Beatrice Turina
- Renzo Ricci as Giudice Fumaroli
- Jean Richard as Fiorillo
- Paola Borboni as Miss Monti
- Lauro Gazzolo as Domenico Barbaja
- Danilo Berardinelli as Niccolò Paganini
- Renzo Giovampietro as Saverio Mercadante
- Camillo Pilotto as Rettore Conservatorio
- Luigi Tosi as Felice Romani
- Dante Maggio as Il pazzariello
- Nino Vingelli as Il guappo
