= If You Won a Hundred Million =

1953 film by Carlo Campogalliani

- Directed by: Carlo Campogalliani; Carlo Moscovini
- Written by: Sandro Continenza (segment "L'indossatrice"); Marcello Marchesi (segment "Il principale"); Vittorio Metz (segment "Il principale"); Dino Verde (segment "Il tifoso")
- Produced by: Luigi E. De Angelis
- Starring: Tino Scotti; Nerio Bernardi; Anna Carena
- Cinematography: Fernando Risi
- Edited by: Mario Bonotti
- Music by: Armando Fragna
- Release date: 1953
- Running time: 100 minutes
- Country: Italy
- Language: Italian

If You Won a Hundred Million (Italian: Se vincessi cento milioni) is a 1953 Italian comedy film directed by Carlo Campogalliani and Carlo Moscovini and starring Tino Scotti, Nerio Bernardi and Anna Carena. It is an anthology film split into several different episodes.

== Plot ==
=== The fan ===
A fan hopes that his favorite team will one day finish first in the standings. One day his requests are granted and, by betting, the young man wins a lot of money, with which he can go on vacation to Hawaii.

=== The model ===
A simple model is in love with a superior of her; she hopes she can win a nice nest egg to so join her beloved of hers. She succeeds, but when she finally introduces herself to her Mario, she discovers that the man already has someone else.

=== The main ===
Ugo is an entrepreneur who owns a brewery, but contrary to his expectations he is hated by all his friends and even by employees. When he wins a large sum he decides to take revenge once and for all by firing all the staff: he closes the factory and leaves his city, skidding in a sports car and waving an umbrella to everyone.

=== The retired ===
A poor old man has not received his pension for a long time. When the story finally breaks free and the money is about to be handed over, it is too late: the man has already taken his own life.

=== The promised ... married ===
Angelo and Stella are about to get married, while the father of the lucky one, modest manager of a farm, receives a large sum. The man immediately took advantage of this to renovate the building and thus be able to receive more tourists, involving not only his family, but also that of the bride.

== Cast ==
- Tino Scotti as Ambrogio (segment "Il tifoso")
- Nerio Bernardi as Commendator Galloni (segment "Il tifoso")
- Anna Carena as La moglie di Ambrogio (segment "Il tifoso")
- Enzo Maggio as Beniamino (segment "Il tifoso")
- Elsa Martinelli as Anna (segment "L'indossatrice")
- Armando Francioli as Mario (segment "L'indossatrice")
- Milly Vitale as (segment "L'indossatrice")
- Ugo Tognazzi as Ugo (segment "Il principale")
- Alberto Sorrentino as Un impiegato (segment "Il principale")
- Lucia Banti as Luisa (segment "Il principale")
- Carlo Rizzo as Il principale (segment "Il principale")
- Carlo Campanini as Ventura (segment "Il pensionato")
- Andrea Checchi as (segment "Il pensionato")
- Renato Chiantoni as Roberto Greppi (segment "Il pensionato")
- Memmo Carotenuto as Angelo Natarello (segment "Il promesso... sposato")
- Checco Durante as Giovanni (segment "Il promesso... sposato")
- Anita Durante as Pasqua (segment "Il promesso... sposato")
- Isa Querio as Stella (segment "Il promesso... sposato")
- Margherita Bagni
- Gabriella Cioli
- Franco Pesce
- Amina Pirani Maggi
- Silvana Stefanini
- Marcella Mariani

== Bibliography ==
- Mark Betz. Beyond the Subtitle: Remapping European Art Cinema. University of Minnesota Press, 2009.
