= New Moon (1925 film) =

1925 film

- Directed by: Armando Fizzarotti; Mario Volpe
- Starring: Ubaldo Maria Del Colle
- Cinematography: Alfredo Di Fede
- Production company: Astra Film
- Distributed by: Astra Film
- Release date: November 1925
- Country: Italy
- Languages: Silent; Italian intertitles

New Moon (Italian: Luna nuova) is a 1925 Italian silent film directed by Armando Fizzarotti and Mario Volpe.

== Cast ==
- Pietro Campanella
- Ubaldo Maria Del Colle
- Miguel Di Giacomo
- Enzo Fabiano
- Vittoria Gey

== Bibliography ==
- Aldo Bernardini & Vittorio Martinelli. Il cinema muto italiano, Volume 15. Nuova ERI, 1996.
