= The Overcoat (1952 film) =

1952 film

Il Cappotto
- original theatrical release poster
- Directed by: Alberto Lattuada
- Written by: Alberto Lattuada; Giorgio Prosperi; Giordano Corsi; Enzo Curreli; Luigi Malerba; Leonardo Sinisgalli; Cesare Zavattini
- Produced by: Enzo Curreli
- Starring: Renato Rascel; Yvonne Sanson; Giulio Stival; Antonella Lualdi
- Cinematography: Mario Montuori A.I.C.
- Edited by: Eraldo Da Roma
- Music by: Felice Lattuada
- Production company: Faro Film
- Distributed by: Titanus
- Release date: 3 October 1952
- Running time: 101 minutes
- Country: Italy
- Language: Italian

The Overcoat (Italian: Il Cappotto) is a 1952 Italian fantasy-drama film directed by Alberto Lattuada. It stars Renato Rascel and is a modern-day version, set in Italy, of the same-named 1842 short tale by Nikolai Gogol. The director's sister, Bianca Lattuada, was one of the production managers and his father, Felice Lattuada, composed the music.

It was shot at the Farnesina Studios of Titanus in Rome with sets designed by the art director Gianni Polidori. Location shooting took place in Pavia in Lombardy.

== Plot ==
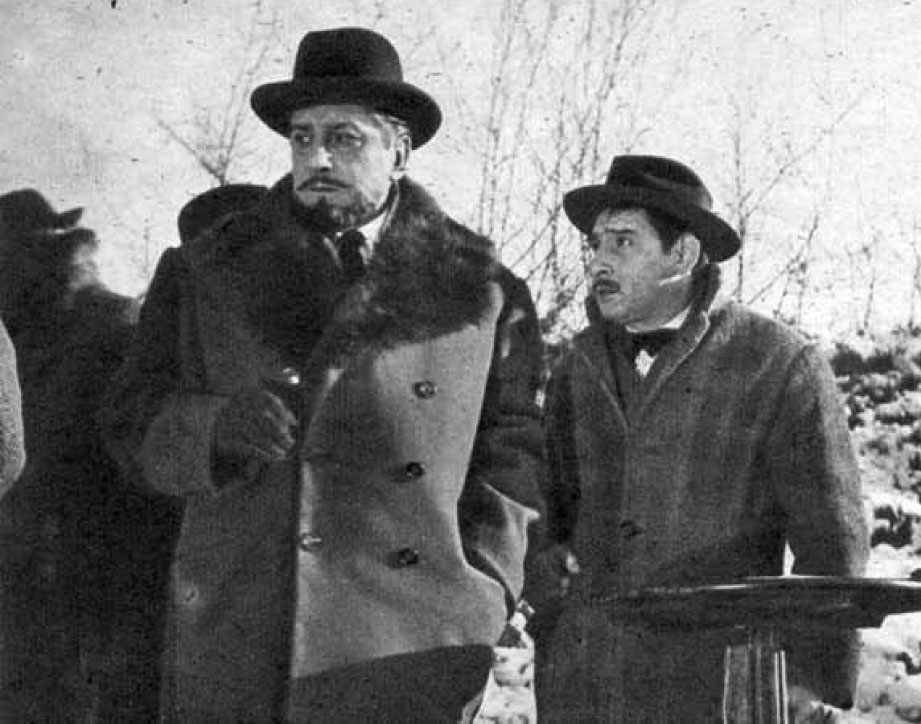
Giulio Stival as the mayor and Renato Rascel as Carmine

The Northern Italian town of Pavia in the 1930s. Carmine De Carmine, a clerk employed in the town hall, lives very modestly in a rented room. He is devoted to his work, but is continually ignored or demeaned by the town's general secretary as well as by the mayor, an ambitious and corrupt politician, who has both a wife and a mistress. Carmine wears a shabby and threadbare coat which leaves him exposed to cold winter winds, but since he can barely pay the rent, a good winter coat is beyond his means. One day a beautiful and elegant woman, taking him for a beggar, gives him a considerable sum which Carmine brings to a tailor as a downpayment for an elegant coat with a fur collar.

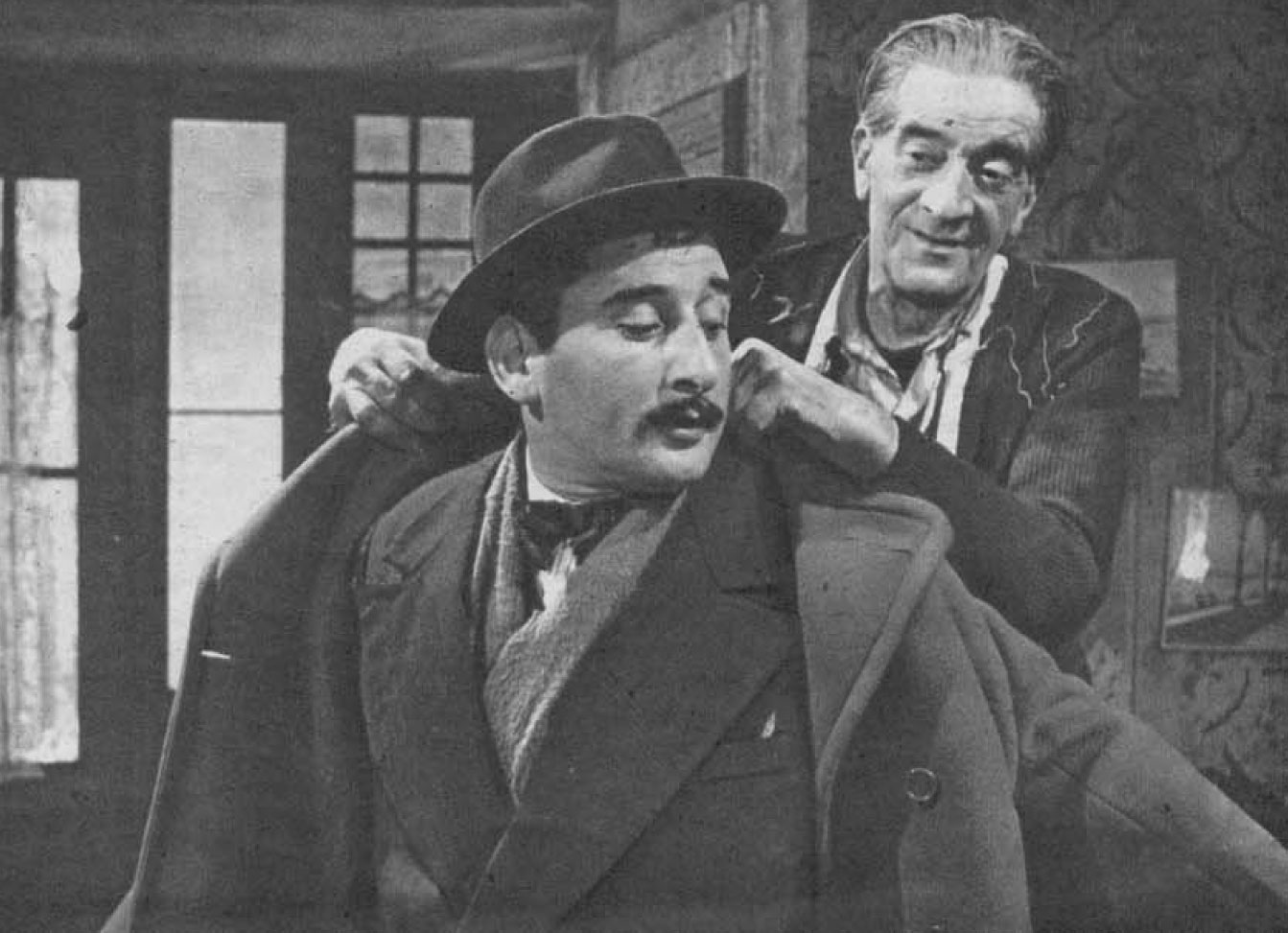
Giulio Calì as the tailor with Renato Rascel

At work, Carmine is accidentally present at a compromising meeting during which businessmen promise a bribe to the general secretary who, to keep Carmine quiet, promises him a large productivity bonus. Meanwhile, the coat is finally ready and, as Carmine puts it on, he feels like a king and walks around the town as if he owns the place, followed by the tailor who is proud of his own role in Carmine's transformation. On New Year's Eve wearing, as usual, his precious overcoat, he goes to the reception to which he had been invited by the secretary general. There, he sees the same beautiful lady who had given him the money and who, unknown to him, is the mayor's mistress. Tipsy from the numerous New Year's toasts, Carmine makes a speech expressing compassion for the impoverished masses, which is very coldly received by the other attendees. Finally, before leaving, he waltzes with the beautiful woman.

After the party, as Carmine is walking home down a dark street, filled with the aspiration of finally being somebody, he is attacked and robbed of the coat. Desolate, he asks for help and sympathy from anyone who would listen, but they are all indifferent, including policemen, municipal officials and, above all, the mayor, who brusquely tells Carmine not to bother him with such trivialities. In a hopeless mindset, Carmine returns to wearing his tattered old coat, but soon suffers a nervous breakdown followed by pneumonia which ends his life.

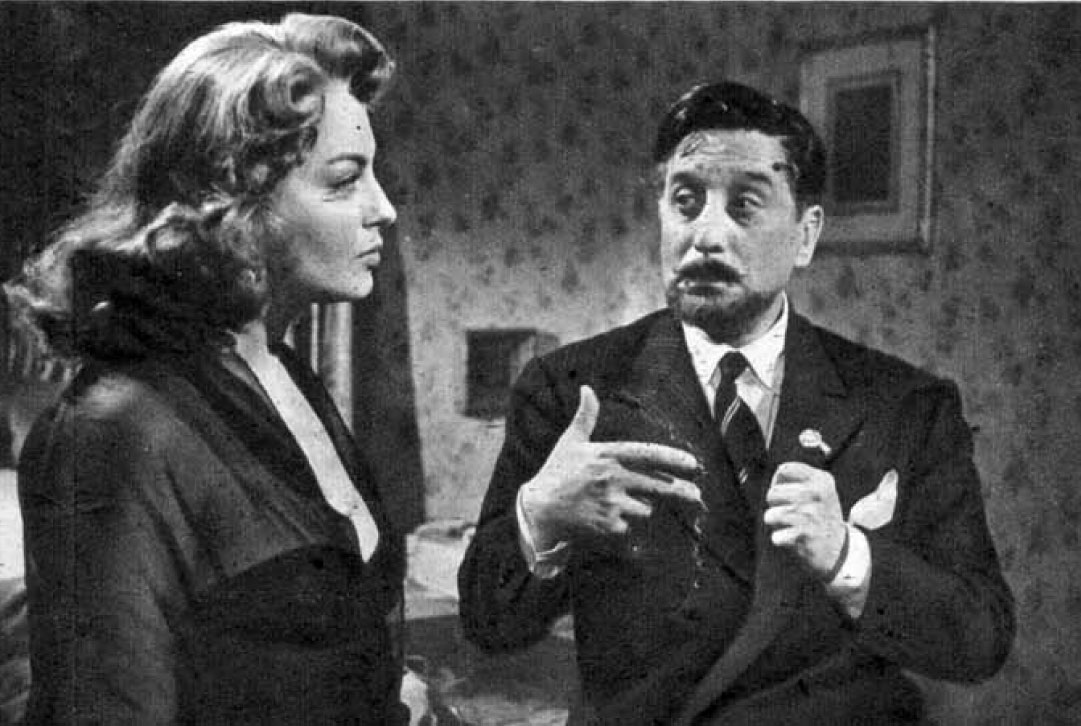
Yvonne Sanson as the mayor's mistress and Giulio Stival as the mayor

However, even after death, Carmine's hurt and humiliated spirit cannot rest. After the noisy passage of his funeral wagon disturbs a pompous public ceremony officiated by the mayor, Carmine's apparition roams the town streets, stripping pedestrians of their winter coats during cold and foggy winter evenings and frightening them with sound of his voice. He appears in the house of the mayor's beautiful mistress, while the mayor is there, violating their privacy and causing the mayor to experience a premonition of unease which comes to a realization when, on his way home through a dark street, he is confronted with the visible image of Carmine, floating a slight distance above the ground.

Shocked, the mayor listens as Carmine recounts to him, from the beyond, the weight carried by the lack of empathy and humanity from him and others like him. As Carmine speaks, the mayor's dark hair turns white and he repents.

== Cast ==
Renato Rascel	Carmine De Carmine
Yvonne Sanson	Caterina, the mayor's mistress
Giulio Stival	the mayor
Ettore Mattia	the general secretary
Giulio Calì	the tailor
Olinto Cristina
Anna Maria Carena	the landlady
Sandro Somarè	Vittoria's fiancé
Luigi Moneta

Silvio Bagolini	pushcart vendor
Dina Perbellini
Loris Gizzi	construction worker
Mario Crippa
Alfredo Ragusa	usher
Mimmo Marchetti	office worker
Mimmo Billi
Riccardo Legioni
Gondrano Trucchi	Carmine's roommate
Angela Bevilacqua
Paolo Reale
Giovanni Ranucci

with the participation of Antonella Lualdi	Vittoria, the mayor's daughter

== Awards ==
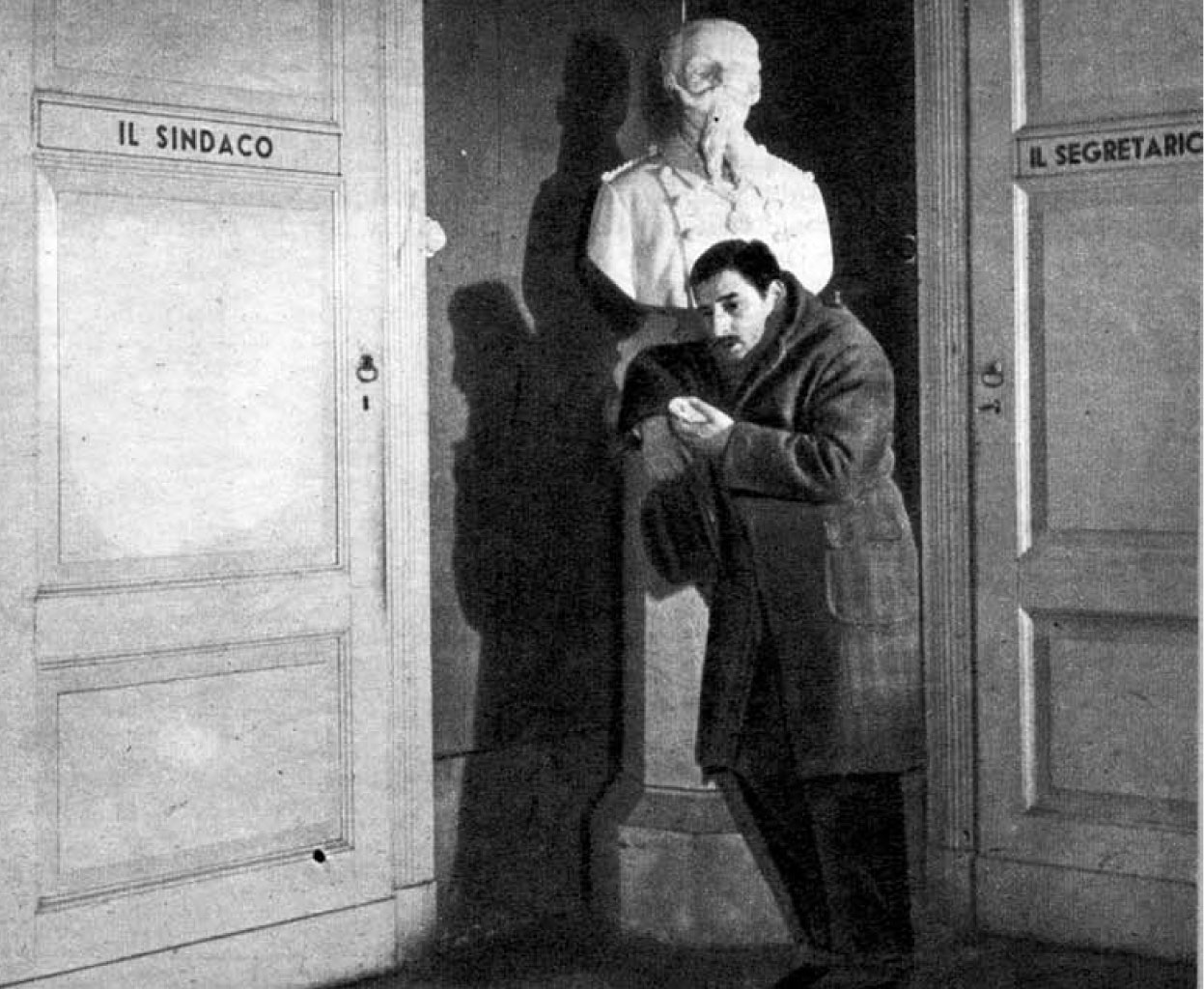
Carmine between the offices of the mayor and the general secretary

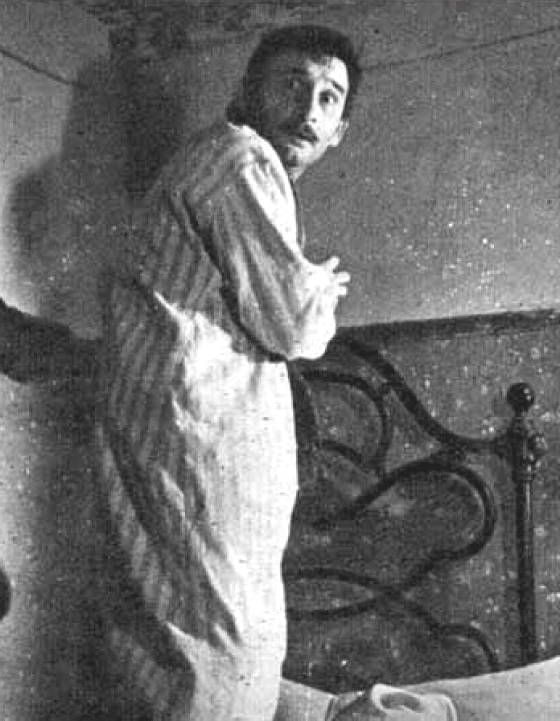
Carmine during his final illness

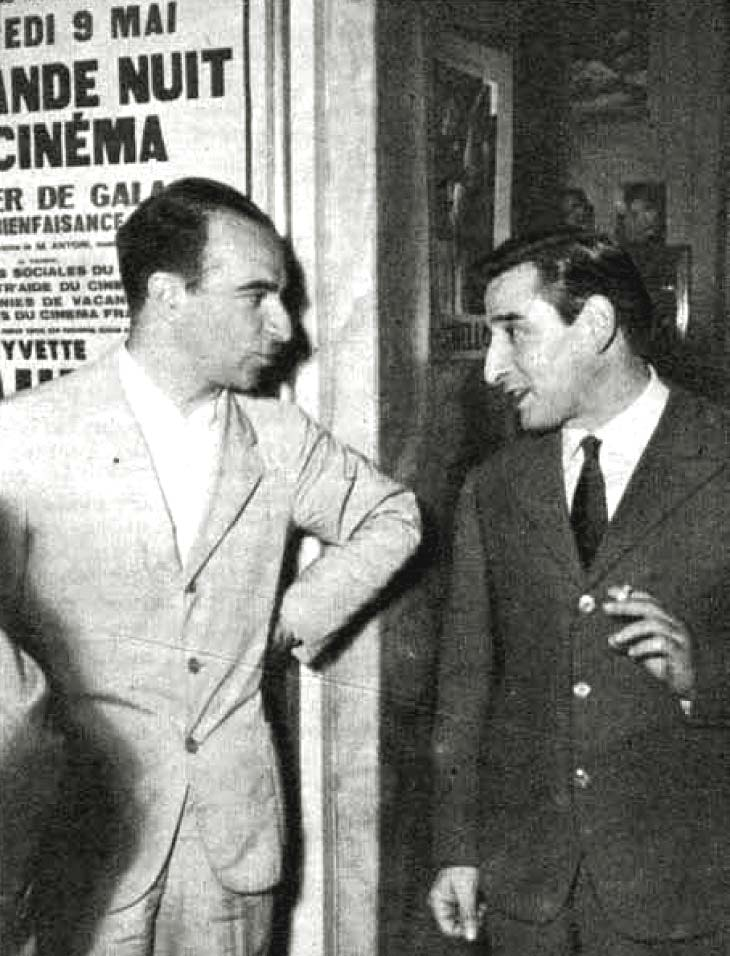
Alberto Lattuada and Renato Rascel at the 1952 Cannes Film Festival

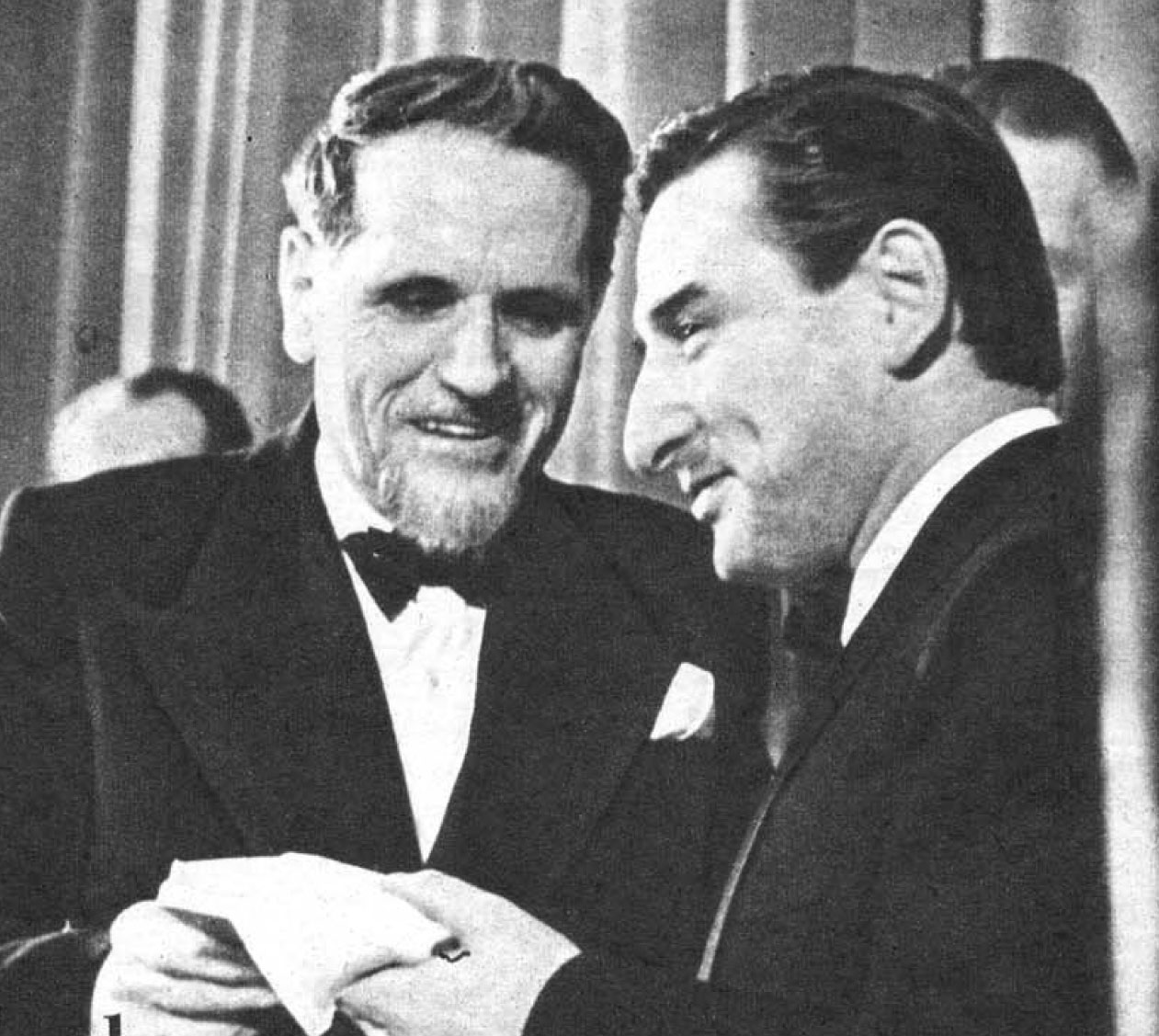
Renato Rascel receives the Nastro d'Argento in 1953 for The Overcoat

Special Nastro d'Argento to Renato Rascel for the creation of the leading character. The film premiered at the 1952 Cannes Film Festival.
