= Antonella Lualdi =

Italian actress (1931–2023)

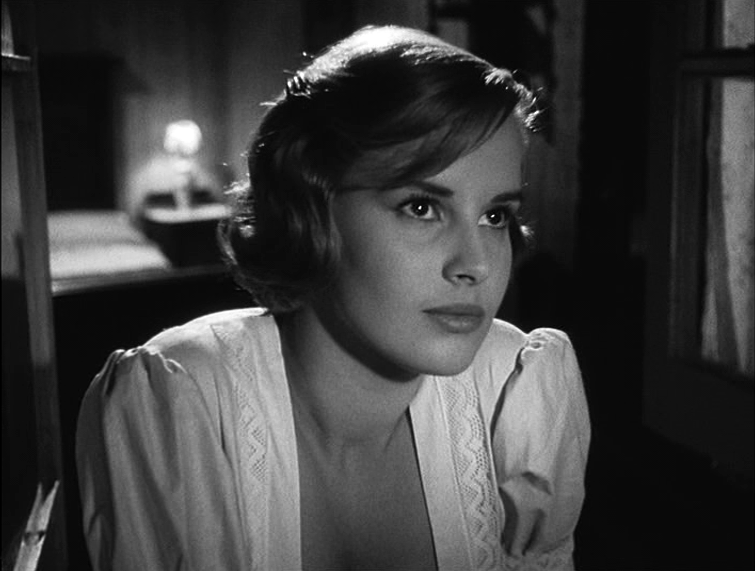
- Lualdi in the movie Chronicle of Poor Lovers (1954)
- Born: Antonietta de Pascale; 6 July 1931; Beirut, Greater Lebanon
- Died: 10 August 2023 (aged 92); Rome, Italy
- Occupation: Actress
- Years active: 1949–1994
- Spouse: Franco Interlenghi (m. 1955; died 2015)
- Children: 2

Antonella Lualdi (born Antonietta de Pascale, 6 July 1931 – 10 August 2023) was a Lebanese-born Italian actress and singer. She appeared in many Italian and French films in the 1950s and 1960s, notably in Claude Autant-Lara's film The Red and the Black in 1954.

== Life and career ==
Lualdi began her career in 1949, after having won a contest for new talents of the cinema magazine Hollywood, in which she was presented as "Signorina X" ("Miss X"), inviting the readers to choose her stage name.

After having starred with him in several films, she married Italian actor Franco Interlenghi in 1955; the couple had two daughters, Stella and Antonellina, an actress in her own right.

In 1974 she debuted in France as a singer with some success and critical acclaim, then she also debuted on stage with the comedy Le Moulin de la Galette, with which she toured across several European countries.

Antonella Lualdi died on 10 August 2023, at the age of 92.

== Selected filmography ==
- Prince of Foxes (1949) (uncredited)
- Little Lady (1949) - Maria Censi
- Songs in the Streets (1950) - Anna
- The Last Sentence (1951) - Maria, la nipote di Santini
- Abbiamo vinto! (1951) - Elsa Nardecchi
- Miracle in Viggiù (1951) - Antonella
- His Last Twelve Hours (1951) - Daniela Valsetti
- The Two Sergeants (1951)
- Ha fatto tredici (1951) - Mirella
- Repentance (1952)
- The Overcoat (1952) - Vittoria
- Adorable Creatures (1952) - Catherine Michaud
- I figli non si vendono (1952) - Daniela
- Three Forbidden Stories (1952) - Anna Maria (Second segment)
- Il romanzo della mia vita (1952) - Maria De Marchis
- The Piano Tuner Has Arrived (1952) - Giulietta Narducci
- Cats and Dogs (1952) - Lia
- Solo per te Lucia (1952)
- The Blind Woman of Sorrento (1953) - Beatrice di Rionero
- Perdonami! (1953) - Anna Gerace
- The Daughter of the Regiment (1953) - Tony (Italian version)
- Cavalcade of Song (1953) - La dirimpettaia del quinto piano
- The Story of William Tell (1953) - Anna Walden
- What Scoundrels Men Are! (1953) - Mariuccia
- Casta Diva (1954) - Maddalena Fumaroli
- Mid-Century Loves (1954) - Carla (segment "Napoli 1943")
- Chronicle of Poor Lovers (1954) - Milena
- Pietà per chi cade (1954) - Bianca Savelli
- Papà Pacifico (1954) - Luisa Ceccacci
- Avanzi di galera (1954) - Giovanna, the nurse
- The Red and the Black (1954) - Mathilde de La Mole
- Le signorine dello 04 (1955) - Maria Teresa
- Wild Love (1955) - Luisa
- Andrea Chénier (1955) - Madeleine de Coigny
- Wild Love (1956) - Adriana Latini - la parrucchiera
- Altair (1956) - Elena
- I giorni più belli (1956) - Giulia
- Fathers and Sons (1957) - Giulia Blasi
- Méfiez-vous fillettes (1957) - Dany Dumont
- La cenicienta y Ernesto (1957) - Julia
- Young Husbands (1958) - Lucia
- The Sky Burns (1958) - Laura Sandri
- Mon coquin de père (1958) - Maria
- One Life (1958) - Gilberte de Fourcheville
- Polikuschka (1958) - Irina
- Délit de fuite (1959) - Lucille Aitken
- I Spit on Your Grave (1959) - Lizbeth Shannon
- Bad Girls Don't Cry (1959) - Supplizia
- Match contre la mort (1959) - Annie Lourmel
- Web of Passion (1959) - Léda
- Silver Spoon Set (1960) - Elsa Foresi
- Run with the Devil (1960) - Donata
- Appuntamento a Ischia (1960) - Mirella Argenti
- The Mongols (1961) - Amina
- The Shortest Day (1962)
- My Son, the Hero (1962)
- Disorder (1962)
- Son of the Circus (1963)
- The Swindlers (1963)
- Let's Talk About Women (1964)
- Champagne for Savages (1964)
- 100 Horsemen (1964)
- Su e giù (1965)
- The Sea Pirate (1966)
- How to Seduce a Playboy (1966)
- Massacre in the Black Forest (1967)
- The Column (1968)
- Ragan (1968)
- Un caso di coscienza (1970)
- Vincent, François, Paul and the Others (1974)
- Cross Shot (1976)
- Zero in condotta (1983)
- A Thorn in the Heart (1986)
- Who Wants to Kill Sara? (1992)
- Nefertiti (1994)

== Awards ==
- Premio Cinema italiano Anni d'oro. In 2020 Antonella Lualdi received the award for her role in the 1959 movie La notte Brava (Bad Girls Don't Cry), directed by Mauro Bolognini.
