= I figli non si vendono =

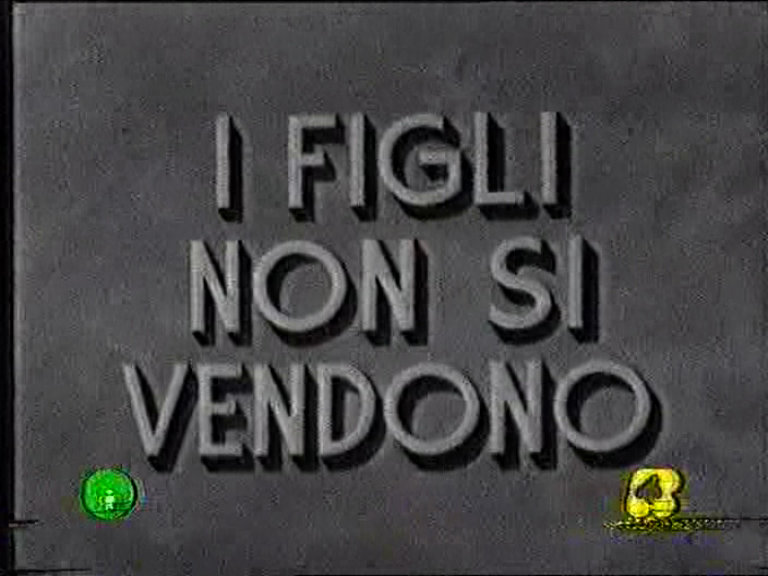
- Opening title
- Directed by: Mario Bonnard
- Written by: Mario Bonnard; Giuseppe Mangione; Nicola Manzari; Giorgio Prosperi
- Produced by: Alberto Manca
- Starring: Lea Padovani; Antonella Lualdi
- Cinematography: Tino Santoni
- Music by: Giulio Bonnard
- Release date: 9 October 1952
- Running time: 104 minutes
- Country: Italy
- Language: Italian

I figli non si vendono (literally, Children must not be sold) is a 1952 Italian melodrama film by Mario Bonnard.

== Cast ==
- Lea Padovani as Anna
- Jacques Sernas as Carlo Dazzeni / Roberto Dazzeni
- Maria Grazia Francia as Luisa
- Paola Barbara as Signora Elena Dazzeni
- Antonella Lualdi as Daniela
- Dario Michaelis as Gianni
- Checco Durante as Paolo Dazzeni
- Galeazzo Benti
- Dina Sassoli
- Dina Perbellini
