= The Sky Burns =

- Directed by: Giuseppe Masini
- Screenplay by: Giuseppe Masini; Ugo Guerra; Mario Guerra; Siro Angeli
- Story by: Giuseppe Masini
- Starring: Amedeo Nazzari; Antonella Lualdi
- Cinematography: Riccardo Pallottini; Anchise Brizzi
- Music by: Angelo Francesco Lavagnino
- Release date: 1958
- Language: Italian

The Sky Burns (Italian: Il cielo brucia) is a 1958 Italian war drama film written and directed by Giuseppe Masini and starring Amedeo Nazzari and Antonella Lualdi.

== Plot ==
An episodic story following the members of the 18th Wing, an Italian Air Force unit, during and after World War II. Each episode poses questions about the right course of action and reflects on the consequences of the characters' choices.

North Africa: Captain Carlo Casati, an Italian bomber squadron commander, is forced to land in Allied-occupied territory due to a mechanical failure, risking capture. With the help of local Italian farmers, he manages to repair his plane and return to Italian lines alongside Anna, who will become his wife.

Italy: Lieutenant Ferri reunites after two years with Laura—the woman he had loved and left to spare her pain; she has since transformed from a factory worker into a singer who entertains wounded soldiers in hospitals. Their reunion is painful, yet a kiss seals their reconciliation. Shortly thereafter, during an air raid, Ferri is hit and his plane crashes into the sea.

Following the armistice, the group flies south to join the co-belligerent Regia Aeronautica; during a reconnaissance mission, Marchi’s plane is hit, though he manages to escape onto a life raft. Rescue efforts are halted due to bad weather, and at sea, Marchi encounters another downed pilot—this one from the Aeronautica Nazionale Repubblicana—but both men are ultimately recovered dead.

After the war, command decides to scrap an old, obsolete aircraft; however, it proves to be the only plane capable of braving a violent storm to transport a young girl suffering from respiratory paralysis to Milan.

== Cast ==
- Amedeo Nazzari as Carlo Casati
- Antonella Lualdi as Laura
- Folco Lulli as Tazzoli
- Fausto Tozzi as Marchi
- Franco Interlenghi as Ferri
- Faith Domergue as Anna
- Walter Santesso as Damonte
- Lída Baarová as Little girl's mother
- Santiago Rivero as The Doctor
- Harald Maresch as Spanò
- Luigi Tosi as Maselli
- Enzo Fiermonte
- Evar Maran
- Emma Baron
- Nino Marchetti

== Reception ==
"The acting is far superior to the direction. The implausibility of certain situations and the melodramatic style employed significantly detract from the lesson in energy the film might otherwise have conveyed."
