= Toto and the King of Rome =

Toto and the King of Rome (Totò e i re di Roma)
- Directed by: Mario Monicelli; Steno
- Written by: Mario Monicelli; Steno; Ennio De Concini; Dino Risi; Peppino De Filippo (from Anton Chekhov's tales)
- Produced by: Romolo Laurenti
- Starring: Totò
- Cinematography: Giuseppe La Torre
- Edited by: Adriana Novelli
- Music by: Nino Rota
- Distributed by: Titanus
- Release date: 17 October 1952
- Running time: 104 minutes
- Country: Italy
- Language: Italian

Toto and the King of Rome (Italian: Totò e i re di Roma) is a 1952 Italian comedy film directed by Mario Monicelli and Steno. Italian horror film director Lucio Fulci worked on this film as an assistant director.

== Plot ==
The film's title alludes playfully to the politicians who rule the town of Rome, since the laws that are in their favor and the tricks that make for years to stay in office. In fact the whole film as a kind of political satire and Italy was also censored.
Ercole Pappalardo is an archivist who is forced to do anything not to lose his job. In fact, some of his colleagues take the dirtiest means for groped to pander to their manager, and Ercole is one of them. Ercole deeply hate Italian politics since according to him is wrong and does not provide any benefit for people in difficulties and may lose the place as him. His troubles begin when by mistake, according to a theatrical show in the gallery, sneezes the head to his audience that the director begins to not take it anymore. Since then, the career of Ercole is in real danger and the only way to save is to do the lick just like his colleagues. Among these is a particularly slimy and cunning: prof Palocco (Alberto Sordi) to obtain a seat on the upper floors with its subterfuge that also puts him to persecute the poor Ercole.

In fact, during that time, Mr. Pappalardo had been entrusted with the task of recovering its director for a parrot that had endured the World War II, but that he had accidentally killed by a shot fired from a bottle cap of champagne. As if all the problems were not enough to Ercole addition, there is also a new one, because the pimp Palocco (Sordi) finds out that Ercole did the exam for primary school, and so Pappalado is forced to study again for to continue his work. The directors of the office try to pass Ercole turning a blind eye to the cause, but the cruel Palocco comes at the last moment. Here is an example of political satire and as a result of censorship: Ercole is asked the name of an elephant and he, not knowing what it was that kind replies "De Gasperi" (the name of the political Alcide De Gasperi, but the Italian censorship cut the joke, imposing a dubbing, so that the current joke results "Bartali" from Gino Bartali).

Ercole is rejected and so hopes to communicate only in death his wife play the numbers on the ticket lottery. Ercole dies and finds himself to wait in the office of the High Pines to gain access to Heaven. Having waited so long for the overcrowding of divine offices, God summons Hercules and would punish him for the gesture he made. Yet when God discovers that Ercole has worked for thirty years in the archives of the Ministry, without ever being noticed and praised for what he has done with some increase in salary or grade, he sends him in Heaven. Now, finally, Ercole can make his family grow rich by communicating his lottery numbers to his wife in dreams.

== Cast ==
- Totò as Ercole Pappalardo
- Aroldo Tieri as Ferruccio
- Alberto Sordi as Palocco
- Celeste Almieri
- Ernesto Almirante as God
- Armando Annuale as a musician
- Giulio Battiferri as a keeper
- Giulio Calì as a trumpet player
- Anna Carena as Armida, Ercole's wife
- Pietro Carloni as office manager Capasso
- Mario Castellani as Corrado
- Paolo Ferrara as a teacher
- Marisa Finiani as a call-girl
- Giovanna Pala as Ines, Ercole's daughter
- Giulio Stival as minister Langherozzi Schianchi
