= The Angel of Sin =

1952 film

- Directed by: Leonardo De Mitri; Vittorio Carpignano
- Written by: Luigi Bonelli; Leonardo De Mitri; Roberto De Robertis; Giorgio Prosperi
- Produced by: Nicolò Bonayuto
- Starring: Roldano Lupi; Gaby André; Luigi Tosi
- Cinematography: Carlo Bellero
- Edited by: Loris Bellero
- Music by: Filippo Filippini
- Production company: Bonayuto Film
- Distributed by: Indipendenti Regionali
- Release date: 1952
- Country: Italy
- Language: Italian

The Angel of Sin (Italian: L'angelo del peccato) is a 1952 Italian melodrama film directed by Leonardo De Mitri and Vittorio Carpignano and starring Roldano Lupi, Gaby André and Luigi Tosi. The film's sets were designed by the art director Arrigo Equini.

== Cast ==
- Roldano Lupi as Conte
- Gaby André as Elena
- Luigi Tosi as Bruno
- Maria Grazia Francia as Annetta
- Umberto Spadaro as Scarpone
- André Le Gall as Tore
- Mario Mazza as Don Fabio
- Violetta Gragnani as Maria Rosa
- Guglielmo Ferro as Lunardo - padre di Bruno
- Renato Lupi as L'amministratore
- Anna Parisi as La Perpetua
- Riccardo Ferri as Grippa - marito di Maria Rosa
- Daniele Danielli as Medico

== Bibliography ==
- Chiti, Roberto & Poppi, Roberto. Dizionario del cinema italiano: Dal 1945 al 1959. Gremese Editore, 1991.
