= Fedele Gentile =

Italian film actor (1908–1993)

- Born: 28 January 1908; Montenero di Bisaccia, Molise, Italy
- Died: 16 December 1993 (aged 85); Rome, Lazio, Italy
- Occupation: Actor
- Years active: 1931–1982 (film & TV)

Fedele Gentile (1908–1993) was an Italian film actor.

== Selected filmography ==
- The Man with the Claw (1931)
- Captain Fracasse (1940)
- Big Shoes (1940)
- The Secret Lover (1941)
- Fedora (1942)
- Bengasi (1942)
- Souls in Turmoil (1942)
- The Ten Commandments (1945)
- The Whole City Sings (1945)
- Rome, Free City (1946)
- The Opium Den (1947)
- Eleonora Duse (1947)
- Eleven Men and a Ball (1948)
- The Two Sisters (1950)
- The Black Captain (1951)
- Lorenzaccio (1951)
- Il romanzo della mia vita (1952)
- My Life Is Yours (1953)
- Captain Phantom (1953)
- Condemned to Hang (1953)
- Naples Is Always Naples (1954)
- Barrier of the Law (1954)
- Supreme Confession (1956)
- Herod the Great (1958)
- Devil's Cavaliers (1959)
- Juke box urli d'amore (1959)
- Knight of 100 Faces (1960)
- Caesar the Conqueror (1962)
- Revolt of the Praetorians (1964)
- The Magnificent Gladiator (1964)
- Vengeance of the Vikings (1965)
- Drummer of Vengeance (1971)

== Bibliography ==
- Roy Kinnard & Tony Crnkovich. Italian Sword and Sandal Films, 1908–1990. McFarland, 2017.
