= Franca Dominici =

Italian actress and voice actress

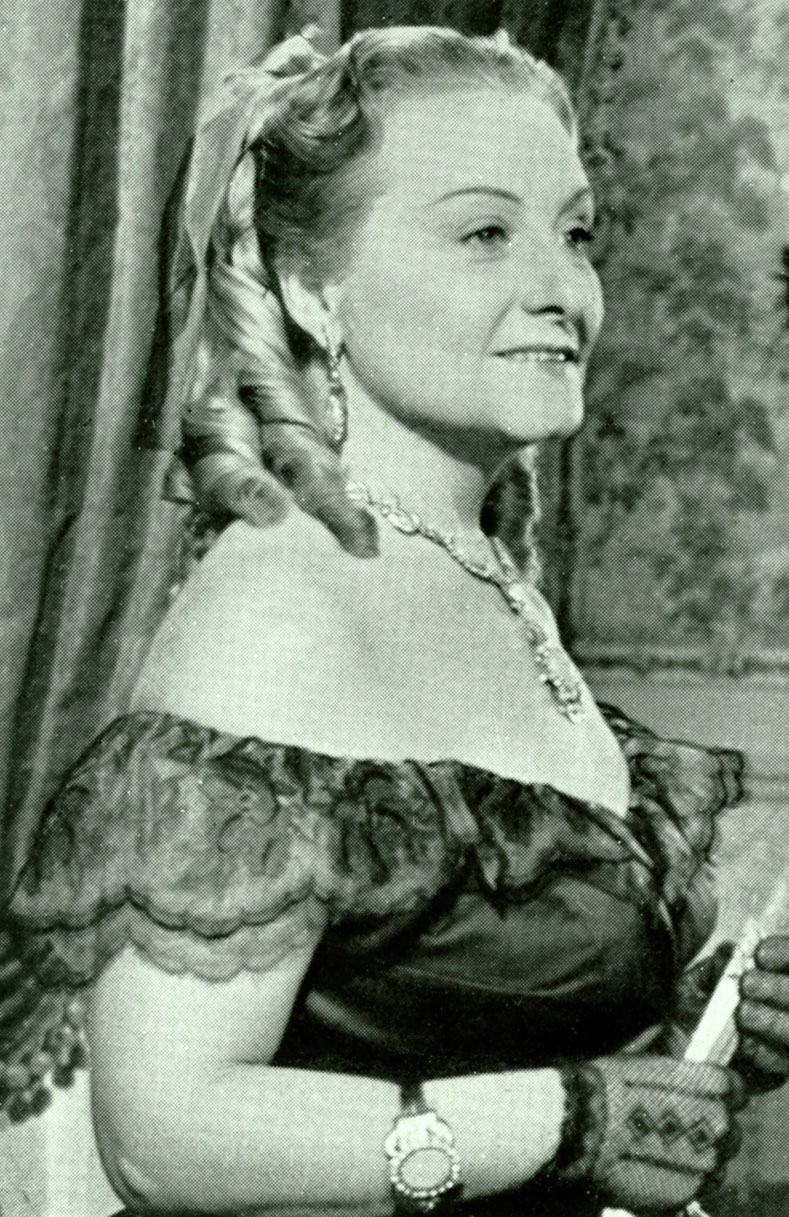
- Dominici in 1953
- Born: Francesca Dominici; 25 June 1907; Bologna, Kingdom of Italy
- Died: 14 October 1997 (aged 90); Rome, Italy
- Occupations: Actress; voice actress
- Years active: 1926–1997
- Children: 1

Francesca "Franca" Dominici (25 June 1907 – 14 October 1997) was an Italian actress and voice actress.

== Biography ==
Born in Bologna, the daughter of the actor Enrico, after studying at the istituto tecnico Dominici began her career on stage in her early twenties, in 1926, entering the theatrical company of Alfredo De Sanctis.

In the early 1930s, she had her first roles as lead actress, then she founded with Mario Siletti the stable company at the Teatro delle Muse in Rome. In the late 1930s Dominici started an intense career as a character actress in films and later in television; in 1967 she had the main role in the television film La madre di nostra figlia.

Dominici also had a long radio activity and an intense career as a voice actress and a dubber, being the Italian voice of important actresses such as Thelma Ritter, Constance Bennett, Patricia Neal, Edwige Feuillère, Carmen Miranda and Joan Blondell. In her animated roles, she voiced Mother Rabbit in the Italian version of Robin Hood and Lady Tremaine in the 1967 redub of Cinderella.

== Selected filmography ==
- The Ten Commandments (1945)
- Verdi, the King of Melody (1953)
- Schiava del peccato (1954)
- Wives and Obscurities (1956)
- The Intruder (1956)
- The Rival (1956)
- La trovatella di Pompei (1957)
- Il carro armato dell'8 settembre (1960)
- Kill, Baby, Kill (1966)
- Boccaccio (1972)
- Il nano e la strega (1974) - voice
- Travolto dagli affetti familiari (1978)
- Troppo forte (1985)
