= Marco Scarpelli =

Italian cinematographer

- Born: 8 April 1918; Bergamo, Italy
- Died: 1995 (aged 76–77)
- Occupation: Cinematographer
- Years active: 1947-1977 (film)

Marco Scarpelli (1918–1995) was an Italian cinematographer.

== Selected filmography ==
- The Outlaws (1950)
- Strano appuntamento (1950)
- I'm the Hero (1952)
- Red Shirts (1952)
- Cats and Dogs (1952)
- Siamo tutti inquilini (1953)
- Cavalcade of Song (1953)
- House of Ricordi (1954)
- Schiava del peccato (1954)
- The Art of Getting Along (1954)
- Casta Diva (1954)
- A Day in Court (1954)
- Bravissimo (1955)
- Eighteen Year Olds (1955)
- Altair (1956)
- Supreme Confession (1956)
- Toto in the Moon (1958)
- The Road a Year Long (1958)
- Uncle Was a Vampire (1959)
- Who Hesitates Is Lost (1960)
- Messalina (1960)
- His Women (1961)
- Attack of the Normans (1962)
- Il segno del comando (1971)
- We Are All in Temporary Liberty (1971)

== Bibliography ==
- Mitchell, Charles P. The Great Composers Portrayed on Film, 1913 through 2002. McFarland, 2004.
