= Maria Grazia Francia =

Italian actress (1931–2021)

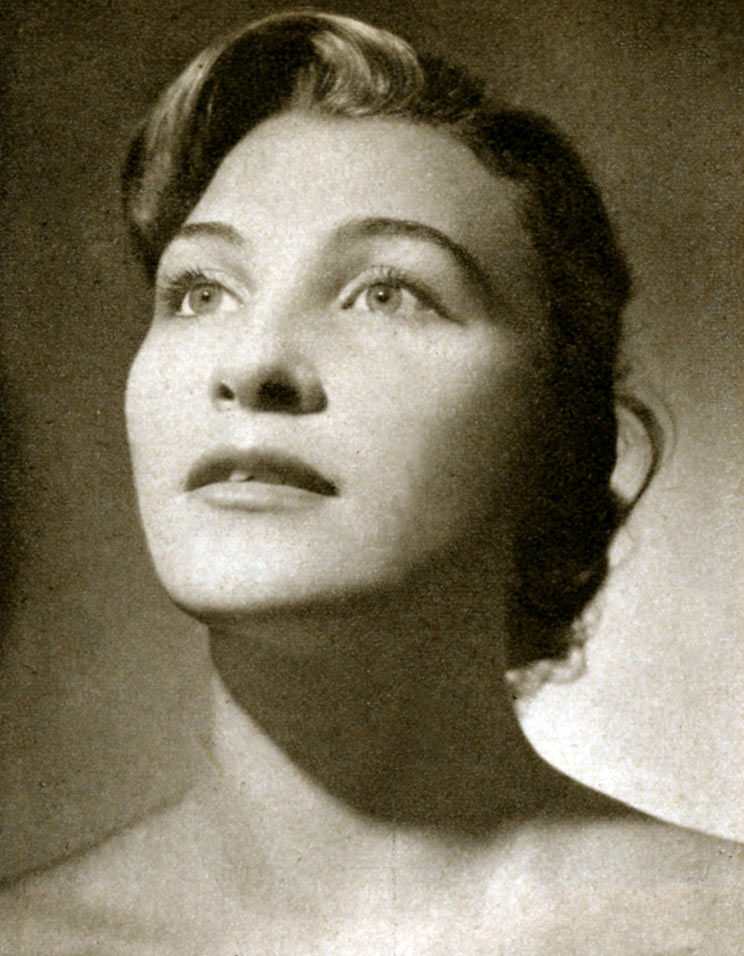
- Born: 17 September 1931; Florence, Kingdom of Italy
- Died: 4 March 2021 (aged 89); Terni, Italy
- Occupation: Actress

Maria Grazia Francia (17 September 1931 – 4 March 2021) was an Italian actress of classic cinema.

== Career ==
Born in Florence, in the mid-1940s Francia moved to Rome to attend the Centro Sperimentale di Cinematografia. She eventually left the course to star alongside Anna Magnani in Gennaro Righelli's Abbasso la ricchezza!. Since then she appeared in several important films, directed by directors such as Luigi Zampa, Giuseppe De Santis and Mario Bonnard. She was also active on stage and on television dramas, before retiring from acting in the early 1970s. She died on 4 March 2021, at the age of 89 in Terni, Italy.

== Selected filmography ==
- Peddlin' in Society (1946)
- L'onorevole Angelina (1947)
- Bitter Rice (1949)
- Flying Squadron (1949)
- No Peace Under the Olive Tree (1950)
- The Outlaws (1950)
- The Vow (1950)

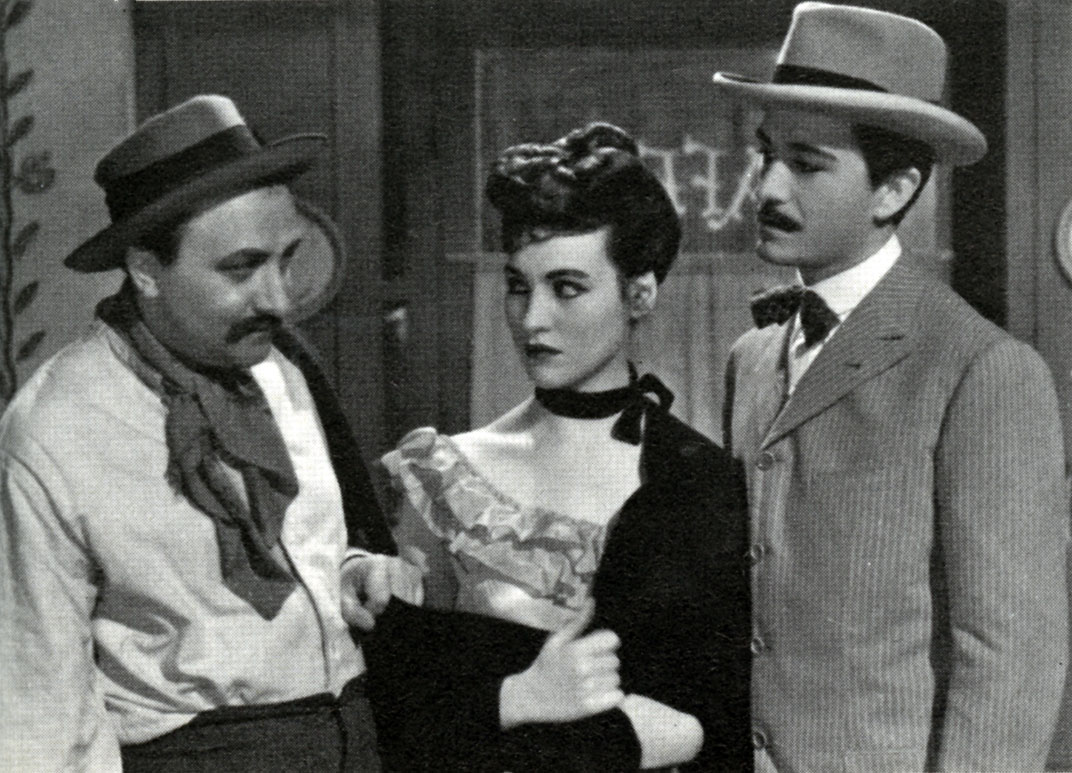
Francia, in the middle, in The Vow (1950)

- Santa Lucia luntana... (1951)
- Due sorelle amano (1951)
- Auguri e figli maschi (1951)
- I figli non si vendono (1952)
- Rome 11:00 (1952)
- The Angel of Sin (1952)
- Voice of Silence (1953)
- Rimorso (1953)
- Milady and the Musketeers (1953)
- La peccatrice dell'isola (1953)
- I piombi di Venezia (1953)
- Schiava del peccato (1954)
- Goodbye Naples (1955)
- I pappagalli (1956)
- Accadde una notte (1956)
- La donna che amo (1957)
- Goodbye, Firenze! (1958)
- Tiro al piccione (1961)
- The Shoot (1964)
- I soldi (1965)
- Una carabina per Schüt (1966)
