= Travolto dagli affetti familiari =

1978 film

- Directed by: Mauro Severino
- Written by: Mauro Severino; Giuseppe D'Agata
- Starring: Lando Buzzanca; Andréa Ferréol; Gloria Guida
- Cinematography: Giuseppe Berardini
- Music by: Gianni Ferrio
- Release date: 1978
- Country: Italy
- Language: Italian

Travolto dagli affetti familiari (Swept Away by Family Affection) is a 1978 Italian comedy film directed by Mauro Severino.

== Plot ==
Memé Di Costanzo decides to seduce the dr. Isotta Uccelli, owner of a pharmacy, in order to assure an economic stability to his old grandmother Nana and his dog Piccolo.

== Cast ==
- Lando Buzzanca as Memé Di Costanzo
- Andréa Ferréol as Isotta
- Gloria Guida as Eliana
- Nerina Montagnani as Nana
- Franca Dominici as Isotta's Mother
- Nais Lago as Isotta's Aunt

== See also ==
- List of Italian films of 1978
