= The Outlaws (1950 film) =

- Directed by: Aldo Vergano
- Cinematography: Marco Scarpelli
- Music by: Carlo Rustichelli
- Release date: 9 June 1950
- Country: Italy
- Language: Italian

The Outlaws (Italian: I fuorilegge) is a 1950 Italian crime film directed by Aldo Vergano.

== Plot ==
Turi, having returned to Sicily from abroad, learns that his sister Maruzza is the lover of Cosimo Barrese, a militant of the Movement for the Independence of Sicily, who, abandoned by everyone, has become a bandit. The two would like to get married, but life as an outlaw seems an insurmountable obstacle. Turi asks for revenge on the bandit who has dishonored the family and uses a shady and devious lawyer to drive him into a trap.

== Cast ==
- Vittorio Gassman: Turi
- Maria Grazia Francia: Maruzza
- Ermanno Randi: Cosimo
- Umberto Spadaro: Don Ciccio
- Rocco D'Assunta: Don Agatino Santoro
- Tino Buazzelli: Maresciallo Fulvio
- Virginia Balistrieri: Mother of Turi
- Attilio Dottesio: Capitano dei carabinieri
- Leonardo De Mitri: Baron Lo Curcio
