= Papà ti ricordo =

- Directed by: Mario Volpe
- Cinematography: Achille Primavera
- Music by: Tarcisio Fusco
- Release date: 1952
- Country: Italy
- Language: Italian

Papà ti ricordo (Dad, I remember you) is a 1952 Italian melodrama film directed by Mario Volpe.

== Cast ==
- Paolo Carlini as Andrea
- Lea Padovani as Maria
- Ludmilla Dudarova as Daria
- Irene Genna as Marcellina
- Luigi Tosi
- Aldo Silvani
- Umberto Spadaro
- Nino Pavese
- Erno Crisa
- Pina Piovani
- Doris Duranti
