= Giulio Stival =

Italian stage and film actor

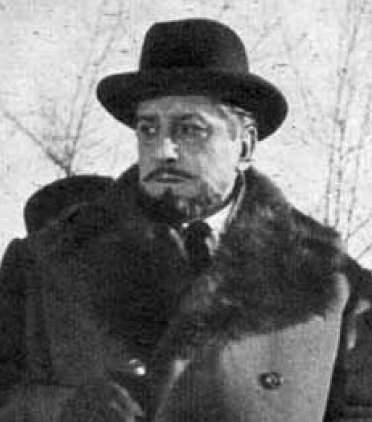
- Stival in The Overcoat (1952)
- Born: 14 March 1902; Venice, Italy
- Died: 1 April 1953 (aged 51); Novara, Italy
- Occupation: Actor

Giulio Stival (14 March 1902 – 1 April 1953) was an Italian stage and film actor.

== Life and career ==
Born in Venice, at a young age, Stival founded an amateur dramatics in which he served both as director and as actor. He made his professional debut in 1927, with the stage company led by Emma Gramatica.

During his career Stival worked with some of the major stage companies of his time, including the ones led by Ruggero Ruggeri, Antonio Gandusio, Memo Benassi, Armando Migliari, Dina Galli (with whom he shared the huge success of the comedy play Felicita Colombo) and the Compagnia dell'Eliseo, with whom he enjoyed significant critical acclaim for his performances in some George Bernard Shaw's adaptations. He also appeared in several films, even if mainly in supporting roles.

Stival died in a car accident, while he was driving from Milan (where he was performing with his stage company) to Turin (where he was shooting the Vittorio Cottafavi's musical drama Traviata '53).

== Selected filmography ==
- The House of Shame (1938)
- Heartbeat (1939)
- Frenzy (1939)
- Eternal Melodies (1940)
- The Brambilla Family Go on Holiday (1941)
- In High Places (1943)
- Yvonne of the Night (1949)
- La taverna della libertà (1950)
- Toto and the King of Rome (1951)
- Ha fatto tredici (1951)
- The Overcoat (1952)
- Three Forbidden Stories (1952)
- The Temptress (1952)
