= Rita Livesi =

Italian stage and film actress (1915–1989)

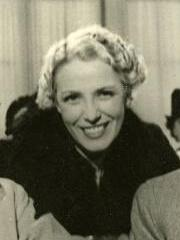
- Livesi in Il destino in tasca (1938)
- Born: 4 March 1915; Siligo, Sardinia, Italy
- Died: 30 April 1989 (aged 74); Rome, Italy
- Occupation: Actress
- Years active: 1935–1985 (film)

Rita Livesi (4 March 1915 – 30 April 1989) was a Sardinian film actress. She is known for Amore amaro (1974), Il berretto a sonagli (1985) and La ragazza del vagone letto (1979). Livesi died in Rome on 30 April 1989, at the age of 74.

== Selected filmography ==
- Cavalry (1936)
- Adam's Tree (1936)
- The Former Mattia Pascal (1937)
- The Man from Nowhere (1937)
- The Lady in White (1938)
- Special Correspondents (1943)
- The Children Are Watching Us (1944)
- Torment (1950)
- Nobody's Children (1951)
- Who is Without Sin (1952)
- Lieutenant Giorgio (1952)
- La voce del sangue (1952)
- Torna! (1953)
- High School (1954)
- Desperate Farewell (1955)
