= Gino Filippini =

Italian composer

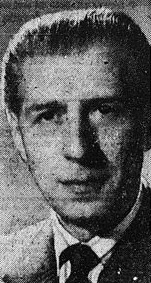
- Born: 7 May 1900; Alessandria, Italy
- Died: 4 April 1962 (aged 61); Rome, Italy

Gino Filippini (7 May 1900 – 4 April 1962) was an Italian composer, conductor and arranger.

Born in Alessandria, the son of an employee of the railways, Filippini was a child prodigy, who started studying piano at 5 years old and who made his first composition, "Fantasia funebre", aged nine. He graduated in composition and piano at the conservatory of his hometown, and after the First World War he moved to Turin where he studied composition under Luigi Perrachio. In the 1920s he was employed as a conductor at Radio Berna, in Switzerland, then he worked in Germany and in Spain.

Returned to Turin, he formed one of the first Italian jazz orchestras and started composing songs, getting his first success in 1939 with "Sulla carrozzella", performed by Odoardo Spadaro. After several hits, in the 1950s he dedicated himself to arrangements for jazz groups and orchestras and to composing musical scores for films and revues.
