= List of Italian films of 1970 =

A list of films produced in Italy in 1970 (see 1970 in film):

Italian films released in 1970
Title	Director	Cast	Genre	Notes
Adiós Chamango	Jose Maria Zabalza	Carlos Quiney, Miguel de la Riva, Claudia Gravy	Western	Spanish–Italian co-production
Adiós, Sabata	Gianfranco Parolini	Yul Brynner, Dean Reed, Ignazio Spalla	Western	
And God Said to Cain	Antonio Margheriti	Klaus Kinski, Peter Carsten	Western	Italian–West German co-production
And Sartana Kills Them All	Rafael Romero Marchent	Gianni Garko, Guglielmo Spoletini, Maria Silva	Western	Spanish–Italian co-production
Angeli senza paradiso	Tinto Brass	Al Bano, Romina Power, Agostina Belli	Musicarello	
The Anonymous Venetian	Enrico Maria Salerno	Tony Musante, Florinda Bolkan		
Arizona Colt Returns	Sergio Martino	Anthony Steffen, Aldo Sambrell	Western	Italian–Spanish co-production
Balsamus, l'uomo di Satana	Pupi Avati	Ariano Nanetti, Greta Vayan, Giulio Pizzirani	—N/a	
Bali	Ugo Liberatore, Paolo Heusch	John Steiner, Laura Antonelli	—N/a	Italian–West German co-production
Basta guardarla	Luciano Salce	Maria Grazia Buccella, Carlo Giuffrè, Mariangela Melato	Comedy	
Bed and Board	François Truffaut	Jean-Pierre Léaud, Claude Jade, Daniel Ceccaldi	—N/a	French–Italian co-production
The Bird with the Crystal Plumage	Dario Argento	Tony Musante, Suzy Kendall, Enrico Maria Salerno		Italian–West German co-production
The Bloody Judge	Jesús Franco	Christopher Lee, Maria Schell, Leo Genn	—N/a	Spanish–Italian–West German co-production
Bocche cucite	Pino Tosini	Lou Castel, Carla Romanelli, Roland Carey	Crime	
Borsalino	Jacques Deray	Alain Delon, Jean-Paul Belmondo, Michel Bouquet	Crime	French–Italian co-production
Brancaleone at the Crusades	Mario Monicelli	Vittorio Gassman, Adolfo Celi, Stefania Sandrelli, Paolo Villaggio	Commedia all'italiana	Sequel of Monicelli's L'armata Brancaleone
The Butcher	Claude Chabrol	Stéphane Audran, Jean Yanne, Pasquale Ferone	Thriller	French/Italian co-production
The Butterfly Affair	Jean Herman	Claudia Cardinale, Stanley Baker, Henri Charrière	Comedy	
La califfa	Alberto Bevilacqua	Ugo Tognazzi, Romy Schneider	Drama	
Un caso di coscienza	Giovanni Grimaldi	Lando Buzzanca, Françoise Prévost, Raymond Pellegrin, Turi Ferro, Saro Urzì	Comedy-drama	
Challenge of the MacKennas	León Klimovsky	John Ireland, Robert Woods, Annabella Incontrera	Western	Spanish–Italian co-production
Chapagua's Gold	Renato Savino	George Ardisson, Linda Veras, Rik Battaglia	Western	Italian–French co-production
Chuck Moll	Enzo Barboni	Leonard Mann, Woody Strode, Peter Martell	Western	
The Clowns	Federico Fellini	Federico Fellini, Liana Orfei	Documentary	
Clumsy Hands	Rafael Romero Marchent	Peter Lee Lawrence, Alberto de Mendoza, Pilar Velázquez	Western	Spanish–Italian co-production
Cold Sweat	Terence Young	Charles Bronson, Liv Ullmann, James Mason	—N/a	French–Italian co-production
Come Have Coffee with Us	Alberto Lattuada	Ugo Tognazzi, Francesca Romana Coluzzi	Commedia all'italiana	
Compañeros	Sergio Corbucci	Franco Nero, Tomas Milian, Fernando Rey, Jack Palance	Western	Italian–Spanish–West German co-production
The Conformist	Bernardo Bertolucci	Jean-Louis Trintignant, Stefania Sandrelli, Dominique Sanda, Gastone Moschin		
The Cop	Yves Boisset	Michel Bouquet, Françoise Fabian, Gianni Garko	Crime	
Le coppie	Mario Monicelli Alberto Sordi and Vittorio De Sica	Alberto Sordi, Monica Vitti, Enzo Jannacci	Comedy	
Corbari	Valentino Orsini	Giuliano Gemma, Tina Aumont	War biopic	
Cran d'arrêt	Yves Boisset	Bruno Cremer, Renaud Verley, Marianne Comtell	—N/a	French–Italian co-production
Dead of Summer	Nelo Risi	Jean Seberg, Luigi Pistilli	Drama	
Dead Men Don't Make Shadows	Demofilo Fidani	Hunt Powers, Franco Borelli, Simonetta Vitelli	Western	
Death Occurred Last Night	Duccio Tessari	Raf Vallone, Frank Wolff, Gabriele Tinti	—N/a	Italian–West German co-production
Defeat of the Mafia	Warren Kiefer	Victor Spinetti, Maria Pia Conte	Film noir	
The Deserter	Burt Kennedy, Niksa Fulgozi	Bekim Fehmiu, John Huston, Richard Crenna	Western	Italian–American–Yugoslavian co-production
Il dio serpente	Piero Vivarelli	Nadia Cassini, Beryl Cunningham	Erotic fantasy	
The Divorce	Romolo Guerrieri	Vittorio Gassman, Anna Moffo	Comedy	
Django Against Sartana	Pasquale Squitieri	Luciano Stella, George Ardisson, José Torres	Western	
Django and Sartana Are Coming... It's the End	Demofilo Fidani	Hunt Powers, Gordon Mitchell, Franco Borelli	Western	
Don Franco e Don Ciccio nell'anno della contestazione	Mariano Laurenti	Franco and Ciccio, Edwige Fenech, Yvonne Sanson	Comedy	
Dropout	Tinto Brass	Franco Nero, Vanessa Redgrave, Gigi Proietti	Romantic drama	
I due maghi del pallone	Mariano Laurenti	Franco and Ciccio	Comedy	
Five Dolls for an August Moon	Mario Bava	William Berger, Princess Ira von Fürstenberg, Edwige Fenech	Giallo	
Le foto proibite di una signora per bene	Luciano Ercoli	Pier Paolo Capponi, Simón Andreu, Dagmar Lassander	Giallo	
Franco and Ciccio on the War-Path	Aldo Grimaldi	Franco and Ciccio, Stelvio Rosi	Western	
The Garden of the Finzi-Continis	Vittorio De Sica	Dominique Sanda, Helmut Berger, Fabio Testi, Romolo Valli	—N/a	Italian–West German co-production
A Girl Called Jules	Tonino Valerii	Silvia Dionisio	—N/a	
The Golden Ass	Sergio Spina	Barbara Bouchet, Samy Pavel, John Steiner	Comedy	
Hatchet for the Honeymoon	Mario Bava	Dagmar Lassander, Laura Betti, Femi Benussi	—N/a	
Have a Good Funeral, My Friend... Sartana Will Pay	Giuliano Carnimeo	Gianni Garko, Daniela Giordano, Ivano Staccioli	Western	Italian–Spanish co-production
Hornets' Nest	Phil Karlson	Rock Hudson, Sylva Koscina, Sergio Fantoni	War	
The Howl	Tinto Brass	Tina Aumont, Gigi Proietti	Drama	
Investigation of a Citizen Above Suspicion	Elio Petri	Gian Maria Volonté, Florinda Bolkan, Salvo Randone	—N/a	
Le Mans, Shortcut to Hell	Osvaldo Civirani	Lang Jeffries, Erna Schürer, Edwige Fenech	Action	
Let's Have a Riot	Luigi Zampa	Nino Manfredi, Vittorio Gassman, Alberto Sordi, Enrico Maria Salerno	Commedia all'italiana	
Liberation: The Fire Bulge/ Breakthrough	Yuri Ozerov		drama	
The Lickerish Quartet	Radley Metzger	Silvana Venturelli, Frank Wolff	Erotic drama	
Light the Fuse... Sartana Is Coming	Giuliano Carnimeo	Gianni Garko, Nieves Navarro	Western	
Lonely Hearts	Franco Giraldi	Ugo Tognazzi, Senta Berger	Commedia all'italiana	
Ma chi t'ha dato la patente?	Nando Cicero	Franco and Ciccio	Comedy	
A Man Called Joe Clifford	Leopoldo Savona	Anthony Steffen, Eduardo Fajardo, Maria Paz	Western	
Mafia Connection	Camillo Bazzoni	Antonio Sabàto, Peter Carsten, Florinda Bolkan	Crime	
Many Wars Ago	Francesco Rosi	Gian Maria Volonté, Pier Paolo Capponi, Alain Cuny	Anti war drama	
Matalo!	Cesare Canevari	Lou Castel, Corrado Pani, Antonio Salines	Western	Italian–Spanish co-production
Metello	Mauro Bolognini	Massimo Ranieri, Ottavia Piccolo, Frank Wolff, Tina Aumont, Lucia Bosè	Drama	
Mezzanotte d'amore	Ettore Maria Fizzarotti	Al Bano and Romina Power, Nino Taranto	Musicarello	
More Dollars for the McGregors	José Luis Merino	Peter Lee Lawrence, Carlos Quiney, Malisa Longo	Western	
The Most Beautiful Wife	Damiano Damiani	Ornella Muti, Tano Cimarosa	—N/a	
Mr. Superinvisible	Antonio Margheriti	Dean Jones, Gastone Moschin	Fantasy	
Ninì Tirabusciò: la donna che inventò la mossa	Marcello Fondato	Monica Vitti, Gastone Moschin, Carlo Giuffrè, Claude Rich	Comedy	
Normal Young Man	Dino Risi	Lino Capolicchio, Janet Agren, Eugene Walter, Jeff Morrow	Drama	
Notes Towards an African Orestes	Pier Paolo Pasolini	Gato Barbieri	Documentary	
One Damned Day at Dawn...Django Meets Sartana!	Demofilo Fidani	Hunt Powers, Fabio Testi, Dino Strano	Western	
Ostia	Luciano Salce	Laurent Terzieff, Franco Citti	Comedy	
Paths of War	Aldo Grimaldi	Franco and Ciccio	western comedy	
The Pizza Triangle	Ettore Scola	Marcello Mastroianni, Monica Vitti, Giancarlo Giannini, Marisa Merlini	Commedia all'italiana	
A Pocketful of Chestnuts	Pietro Germi	Gianni Morandi, Stefania Casini, Nicoletta Machiavelli	Commedia all'italiana	
The President of Borgorosso Football Club	Luigi Filippo D'Amico	Alberto Sordi, Tina Lattanzi, Margarita Lozano	Sports comedy	
A Quiet Place to Kill	Umberto Lenzi	Carroll Baker, Jean Sorel, Marina Coffa	—N/a	Italian–Spanish co-production
La ragazza del prete	Domenico Paolella	Nicola Di Bari, Susanna Martinková	romantic comedy	
The Revenge of Ringo	Mario Pinzauti	Jean Louis, Lucia Bomez, Mickey Hargitay	Western	
Reverend's Colt	Marino Girolami	Guy Madison, Richard Harrison	Western	Spanish–Italian co-production
Rosolino Paternò, soldato...	Nanni Loy	Nino Manfredi, Jason Robards, Peter Falk, Martin Landau	Commedia all'italiana	
Rough Justice	Mario Costa	Klaus Kinski, Gabriella Giorgelli	Western	
Roy Colt and Winchester Jack	Mario Bava	Brett Halsey, Marilù Tolo	Western	
Sartana in the Valley of Death	Roberto Mauri	William Berger, Wayde Preston, Aldo Berti	Western	
Sartana's Here… Trade Your Pistol for a Coffin	Giuliano Carnimeo	George Hilton, Charles Southwood, Erika Blanc	Western	Italian–Spanish co-production
Satiricosissimo	Mariano Laurenti	Franco and Ciccio, Edwige Fenech	Comedy	
Shango	Edoardo Mulargia	Anthony Steffen, Eduardo Fajardo, Maurice Poli	Western	
Splendori e miserie di Madame Royale	Vittorio Caprioli	Ugo Tognazzi, Vittorio Caprioli, Jenny Tamburi, Maurice Ronet	Comedy-drama	
Stagecoach of the Condemned	Juan Bosch	Richard Harrison, Erika Blanc, Fernando Sancho	Western	
Strogoff	Eriprando Visconti	John Phillip Law, Hiram Keller, Delia Boccardo, Mimsy Farmer	Adventure	
The Spider's Stratagem	Bernardo Bertolucci	Giulio Brogi, Alida Valli, Pippo Campanini	Drama	
A Suitcase for a Corpse	Alfonso Brescia	George Ardisson, Françoise Prévost	Giallo	
Sunflower	Vittorio De Sica	Sophia Loren, Marcello Mastroianni, Lyudmila Savelyeva	Drama	
The Swinging Confessors	Marco Vicario	Lando Buzzanca, Rossana Podestà, Salvo Randone, Magali Noël, Barbara Bouchet, Enrico Maria Salerno	Comedy	
The Syndicate: A Death in the Family	Piero Zuffi	Michael Reardon, Barbara Bouchet, Carmelo Bene	—N/a	
They Call Me Trinity	Enzo Barboni	Terence Hill, Bud Spencer, Farley Granger	Western	
Thomas...gli indemoniati	Pupi Avati	Edmund Purdom, Anita Sanders, Bob Tonelli	—N/a	
The Tigers of Mompracem	Mario Sequi	Ivan Rassimov, Claudia Gravy, Andrea Bosic	Adventure	Co-production with Spain
Tulips of Haarlem	Franco Brusati	Carole André, Gianni Garko, Frank Grimes	Drama	
Twenty Steps to Death	Manuel Esteba	Dean Reed, Patty Shepard, Alberto Farnese	Western	
The Twilight Avengers	Adalberto Albertini	Luciano Stella, Pietro Torrisi, Alberto Dell'Acqua	Western	
The Underground	Pino Mercanti	Bruno Piergentili, Conny Carol, Ada Mori	Gangster film	Italian–Spanish co-production
Violent City	Sergio Sollima	Charles Bronson, Jill Ireland, Telly Savalas	Crime	Italian–French co-production
Viva Cangaceiro	Giovanni Fago	Tomas Milian, Ugo Pagliai	Spaghetti Western	
Viva Sabata!	Tulio Demicheli	Anthony Steffen, Peter Lee Lawrence, Eduardo Fajardo	Western	
The Voyeur	Franco Indovina	Marcello Mastroianni, Virna Lisi, Timothy Dalton	Drama	
Your Hands on My Body	Brunello Rondi	Lino Capolicchio, Colette Descombes, Erna Schürer	Giallo	
Wanted Sabata	Roberto Mauri	Vassili Karamesinis, Elena Pedemonte, Paolo Magalotti	Western	
Waterloo	Sergei Bondarchuk	Rod Steiger, Christopher Plummer, Orson Welles	Historical, war	
The Weekend Murders	Michele Lupo	Anna Moffo, Gastone Moschin	Giallo	
When Women Had Tails	Pasquale Festa Campanile	Giuliano Gemma, Senta Berger, Lando Buzzanca	Comedy	
The Wind's Fierce	Mario Camus	Terence Hill, Maria Grazia Buccella, Fernando Rey	Western	Spanish–Italian co-production
Wind from the East	Jean-Luc Godard, Jean-Pierre Gorin, Gérard Martin	Gian Maria Volonté, Anne Wiazemsky, Jose Valera	Western	
W le donne	Aldo Grimaldi	Little Tony, Franco and Ciccio	Musicarello	
