= L'oro del mondo =

- Directed by: Aldo Grimaldi
- Screenplay by: Giovanni Grimaldi
- Story by: Aldo Grimaldi
- Produced by: Gilberto Carbone
- Starring: Al Bano; Romina Power; Linda Christian; Carlo Giordana; Nino Taranto; Antonella Steni; Franco Franchi; Ciccio Ingrassia
- Cinematography: Claudio Ragona
- Edited by: Daniele Alabiso
- Music by: Pino Massara
- Release date: 1968
- Country: Italy
- Language: Italian

L'oro del mondo (Italian for The gold of the world) is a 1968 Italian musicarello comedy film directed by Aldo Grimaldi and starring Al Bano and Romina Power.

== Plot ==
Giorgio, son of a rich industrialist, is attracted with Lorena, a university student, but she's already engaged to Carlo. After having tried in vain to court her, Giorgio resorts to an extreme measure: taking advantage of his father's absence, he threatens to cause the bankruptcy of the small business owned by Lorena's parents. The girl, to avoid the ruin of her family, abandons Carlo without giving him any explanation and agrees to get engaged to Giorgio. Carlo, having learned from a friend the reason for his girlfriend's sudden change of attitude, must confront his rival and teach him lesson.

== Cast ==
- Romina Power as Lorena Vivaldi
- Al Bano as Carlo Carrera
- Linda Christian as Mother of Lorena
- Carlo Giordana as Giorgio Castelli
- Franco Franchi as Franco
- Ciccio Ingrassia as Ciccio
- Nino Taranto as Filippo Pugliese
- Antonella Steni as Pugliese's Wife
- Enrico Montesano as Francesco Alessandroni
- Carla Vistarini as Student
- Carlo Taranto as Concessionario
- Consalvo Dell'Arti as Giorgio's Father
- Nino Terzo as Usher
- Ignazio Leone as Accountant Ferretti

== See also ==
- List of Italian films of 1968
