= Brutti di notte =

- Film poster
- Directed by: Giovanni Grimaldi
- Written by: Giovanni Grimaldi
- Starring: Franco Franchi; Ciccio Ingrassia
- Cinematography: Stelvio Massi
- Edited by: Daniele Alabiso
- Music by: Roberto Pregadio
- Production company: Claudia Cinematografica
- Release date: March 14, 1968
- Running time: 91 minutes
- Country: Italy
- Language: Italian

Brutti di notte (literally "Ugly by night") is a 1968 Italian comedy film written and directed by Giovanni Grimaldi and starring the comic duo Franco and Ciccio. It is a parody of Luis Buñuel's film Belle de Jour.

== Plot ==
Tormented by strange dreams, Franco decides to be examined by a psychoanalyst and, accompanied by Ciccio, his brother-in-law, goes to doctor Federzotti. Having established the cause of the complex that afflicts him, the psychoanalyst prescribes an intense love life as a cure. One day Ciccio discovers him in the company of a lady and immediately warns his wife Rosaspina. The woman, however, having understood that she is the cause of Franco's problems, due to the thick beard that frames her face, decides to get a facial plastic. Completely transformed, she makes an appointment with her husband undercover. Ciccio surprises them and, not knowing the truth, threatens to have Franco kicked out of the house. Rosaspina then reveals her true identity, bringing peace and harmony back into the family.

== Cast ==
- Franco Franchi as himself
- Ciccio Ingrassia as Rosapina's brother
- Gabriella Giorgelli as Rosapina
- Fulvia Franco as Miss Ananas
- Helga Liné as Ursula
- Antonella Steni as Mazzacurati
- Alfredo Rizzo as Dr. Federzotti
- Ignazio Leone as Giulio

== See also ==
- Belle de Jour (film)
- Franco Franchi
- Ciccio Ingrassia
- Franco and Ciccio
- Giovanni Grimaldi
- List of Italian films of 1968
- Italian comedy
