= Franco Franchi =

Italian comedian (1928–1992)

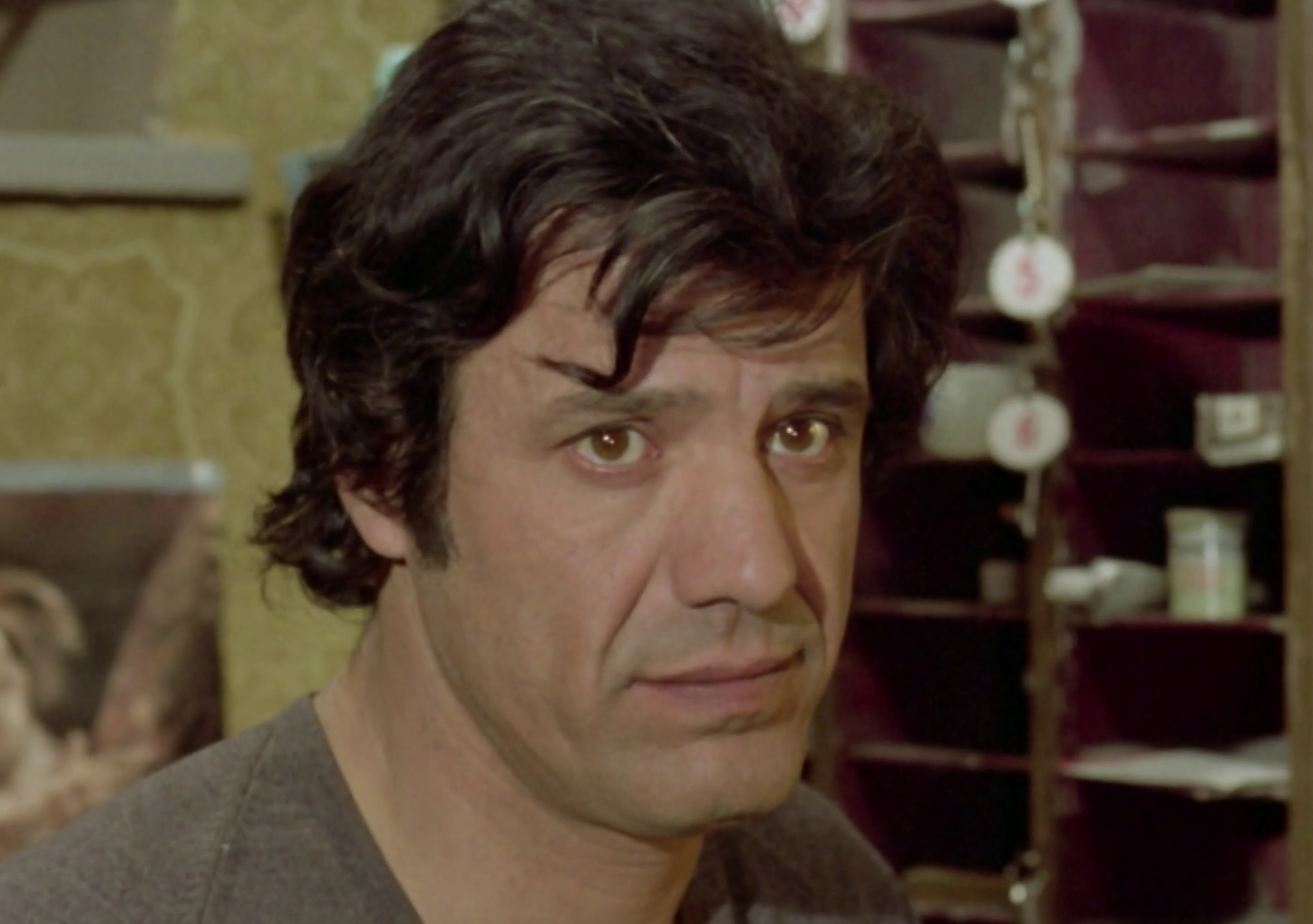
- Franchi in The Last Italian Tango (1973)
- Born: Francesco Benenato; 19 September 1928; Palermo, Sicily, Kingdom of Italy
- Died: 9 December 1992 (aged 64); Rome, Lazio, Italy
- Occupations: Actor; comedian; singer
- Years active: 1945–1992

Francesco Benenato (18 September 1928 – 9 December 1992), known as Franco Franchi, was an Italian actor, comedian and singer.

He was born in Palermo, Sicily and began his career in the 1950s, although his career only really took off in the 1960s. He starred in many comedies, mainly appearing together with Ciccio Ingrassia as the comedy duo Franco and Ciccio, but also in more dramatic material such as Luigi Comencini's The Adventures of Pinocchio (1972, TV miniseries also edited into a theatrical film) – where he played the role of the Cat opposite Ingrassia as the Fox.

In the film War Italian Style (1966), the pair worked with Buster Keaton in one of his last roles.

== Filmography (with Ciccio Ingrassia) ==
- Appuntamento a Ischia, directed by Mario Mattoli (26 September 1960)
- L'onorata società, directed by Riccardo Pazzaglia (30 March 1961)
- 5 marines per 100 ragazze, directed by Mario Mattoli (10 August 1961)
- Hercules in the Valley of Woe, directed by Mario Mattoli (19 October 1961)
- The Last Judgment, directed by Vittorio De Sica (26 October 1961)
- Pugni pupe e marinai, directed by Daniele D'Anza (17 November 1961)
- Gerarchi si muore, directed by Giorgio Simonelli (22 December 1961)
- Il mio amico Benito, directed by Giorgio Bianchi (3 March 1962)
- I tre nemici, directed by Giorgio Simonelli (23 June 1962)
- Those Two in the Legion, directed by Lucio Fulci (16 August 1962)
- 2 samurai per 100 geishe, directed by Giorgio Simonelli (7 September 1962)
- Le massaggiatrici, directed by Lucio Fulci (20 September 1962)
- I motorizzati, directed by Camillo Mastrocinque (29 November 1962)
- Vino, whisky e acqua salata, directed by Mario Amendola (7 December 1962)
- Avventura al motel, directed by Renato Polselli (9 February 1963)
- The Shortest Day, directed by Sergio Corbucci (14 February 1963)
- La donna degli altri è sempre più bella, directed by Marino Girolami (21 February 1963)
- Obiettivo ragazze, directed by Mario Mattoli (5 August 1963)
- Tutto è musica, directed by Domenico Modugno (18 August 1963)
- The Swindlers, directed by Lucio Fulci (25 September 1963)
- I due mafiosi, directed by Giorgio Simonelli (15 January 1964)
- Due mattacchioni al Moulin Rouge, directed by Giuseppe Vari (17 January 1964)
- Le tardone, directed by Marino Girolami (29 January 1964)
- I maniaci, directed by Lucio Fulci (28 March 1964)
- Queste pazze pazze donne, directed by Marino Girolami (22 May 1964)
- Canzoni, bulli e pupe, directed by Carlo Infascelli (29 May 1964)
- I marziani hanno dodici mani, directed by Castellano & Pipolo (21 June 1964)
- Two Mafiamen in the Far West, directed by Giorgio Simonelli (30 June 1964)
- Primitive Love, directed by Luigi Scattini (17 July 1964)
- Le sette vipere, directed by Renato Polselli (11 August 1964)
- Corpse for the Lady, directed by Mario Mattoli (19 August 1964)
- Two Escape from Sing Sing, directed by Lucio Fulci (22 August 1964)
- Amore facile, directed by Gianni Puccini (3 October 1964)
- Oh! Those Most Secret Agents!, directed by Lucio Fulci (10 October 1964)
- Sedotti e bidonati, directed by Giorgio Bianchi (14 October 1964)
- I due toreri, directed by Giorgio Simonelli (3 December 1964)
- A Monster and a Half, directed by Steno (18 December 1964)
- Veneri al sole, directed by Marino Girolami (24 December 1964)
- I due pericoli pubblici, directed by Lucio Fulci (31 December 1964)
- Soldati e caporali, directed by Mario Amendola (31 December 1964)
- I Kill, You Kill, directed by Gianni Puccini (25 March 1965)
- Letti sbagliati, directed by Steno (6 April 1965)
- Per un pugno nell'occhio, directed by Michele Lupo (14 April 1965)
- I figli del leopardo, directed by Sergio Corbucci (21 April 1965)
- Scandali nudi, directed by Enzo Di Gianni (11 June 1965)
- Veneri in collegio, directed by Marino Girolami (26 June 1965)
- Latin Lovers, directed by Mario Costa (11 August 1965)
- Two Sergeants of General Custer, directed by Giorgio Simonelli (13 August 1965)
- Come inguaiammo l'esercito, directed by Lucio Fulci (21 August 1965)
- Two Mafiosi Against Goldginger, directed by Giorgio Simonelli (15 October 1965)
- 002 Operazione Luna, directed by Lucio Fulci (25 November 1965)
- War Italian Style, directed by Luigi Scattini (26 November 1965)
- I due parà, directed by Lucio Fulci (24 December 1965)
- Due mafiosi contro Al Capone, directed by Giorgio Simonelli (4 March 1966)
- How to Rob the Bank of Italy, directed by Lucio Fulci (18 March 1966)
- Dr. Goldfoot and the Girl Bombs, directed by Mario Bava (29 July 1966)[2]
- I due sanculotti, directed by Giorgio Simonelli (13 August 1966)
- Gli altri, gli altri e noi, directed by Maurizio Arena (31 October 1966)
- Two Sons of Ringo, directed by Giorgio Simonelli e Giuliano Carnimeo (7 December 1966)
- Come rubammo la bomba atomica, directed by Lucio Fulci (3 February 1967)
- Il lungo, il corto, il gatto, directed by Lucio Fulci (3 May 1967)
- I Zanzaroni, directed by Ugo La Rosa (17 May 1967)
- The Handsome, the Ugly, and the Stupid, directed by Giovanni Grimaldi (13 August 1967)
- Due Rrringos nel Texas, directed by Marino Girolami (25 August 1967)
- Stasera mi butto, directed by Ettore Maria Fizzarotti (27 October 1967)
- I due vigili, directed by Giuseppe Orlandini (13 December 1967)
- I barbieri di Sicilia, directed by Marcello Ciorciolini (21 December 1967)
- Nel sole, directed by Aldo Grimaldi (22 December 1967)
- Brutti di notte, directed by Giovanni Grimaldi (14 March 1968)
- L'oro del mondo, directed by Aldo Grimaldi (27 March 1968)
- Caprice Italian Style, directed by Mauro Bolognini, Mario Monicelli, Pier Paolo Pasolini, Steno, Franco Rossi (13 April 1968)
- Franco, Ciccio e le vedove allegre, directed by Marino Girolami (13 April 1968)
- The Two Crusaders, directed by Giuseppe Orlandini (7 August 1968)
- Don Chisciotte and Sancio Panza, directed by Giovanni Grimaldi (24 August 1968)
- Ciccio Forgives, I Don't, directed by Marcello Ciorciolini (26 September 1968)
- I due pompieri, directed by Bruno Corbucci (29 October 1968)
- The Nephews of Zorro, directed by Marcello Ciorciolini (12 December 1968)
- I due magnifici fresconi (un imbroglio tutto curve), directed by Marino Girolami (23 December 1968)
- I due deputati, directed by Giovanni Grimaldi (1 January 1969)
- Indovina chi viene a merenda?, directed by Marcello Ciorciolini (2 April 1969)
- Franco, Ciccio e il pirata Barbanera, directed by Mario Amendola (16 September 1969)
- Franco e Ciccio... ladro e guardia, directed by Marcello Ciorciolini (20 November 1969)
- Lisa dagli occhi blu, directed by Bruno Corbucci (23 December 1969)
- Satiricosissimo, directed by Mariano Laurenti (21 January 1970)
- Nel giorno del Signore, directed by Bruno Corbucci (18 March 1970)
- Paths of War, directed by Aldo Grimaldi (26 March 1970)
- Don Franco e Don Ciccio nell'anno della contestazione, directed by Marino Girolami (16 April 1970)
- Ma chi t'ha dato la patente?, directed by Nando Cicero (28 August 1970)
- I due Maggiolini più matti del mondo, directed by Giuseppe Orlandini (29 August 1970)
- Principe coronato cercasi per ricca ereditiera, directed by Giovanni Grimaldi (29 August 1970)
- W le donne, directed by Aldo Grimaldi (4 September 1970)
- Due bianchi nell'Africa nera, directed by Bruno Corbucci (28 October 1970)
- I due maghi del pallone, directed by Mariano Laurenti (2 December 1970)
- Il clan dei due Borsalini, directed by Giuseppe Orlandini (18 February 1971)
- Mazzabubù... Quante corna stanno quaggiù?, directed by Mariano Laurenti (25 February 1971)
- Scusi, ma lei le paga le tasse?, directed by Mino Guerrini (11 March 1971)
- Ma che musica maestro!, directed by Mariano Laurenti (6 April 1971)
- I due della Formula Uno alla corsa più pazza pazza del mondo, directed by Osvaldo Civirani (12 August 1971)
- Venga a fare il soldato da noi, directed by Ettore Maria Fizzarotti (12 August 1971)
- Riuscirà l'avvocato Franco Benenato a sconfiggere il suo acerrimo nemico il pretore Ciccio De Ingras?, directed by Mino Guerrini (19 August 1971)
- Armiamoci e partite!, directed by Nando Cicero (3 September 1971)
- I due pezzi da 90, directed by Osvaldo Civirani (28 October 1971)
- I due assi del guantone, directed by Mariano Laurenti (2 December 1971)
- Continuavano a chiamarli i due piloti più matti del mondo, directed by Mariano Laurenti (8 March 1972)
- Continuavano a chiamarli... er più e er meno, directed by Giuseppe Orlandini (24 March 1972)
- Two Sons of Trinity, directed by Osvaldo Civirani (26 July 1972)
- I due gattoni a nove code... e mezza ad Amsterdam, directed by Osvaldo Civirani (31 July 1972)
- Storia di fifa e di coltello – Er seguito d' Er Più, directed by Mario Amendola (14 August 1972)
- Paolo il freddo, directed by Ciccio Ingrassia (11 April 1974)
- Farfallon, directed by Riccardo Pazzaglia (12 August 1974)
- The Exorciccio (L'Esorciccio), directed by Ciccio Ingrassia (1975)
- Crema, cioccolata e pa... prika, directed by Michele Massimo Tarantini (15 August 1981)
- Kaos (from the tales by Luigi Pirandello, directed by Paolo and Vittorio Taviani (23 November 1984)
