= Ma che musica maestro =

1971 film by Mariano Laurenti

- Directed by: Mariano Laurenti
- Written by: Roberto Gianviti; Dino Verde
- Starring: Gianni Nazzaro; Agostina Belli; Franco Franchi; Ciccio Ingrassia
- Cinematography: Tino Santoni
- Music by: Guycen
- Distributed by: Variety Distribution
- Release date: 1971
- Country: Italy
- Language: Italian

Ma che musica maestro is a 1971 Italian "musicarello" film directed by Mariano Laurenti. It is loosely based on the William Shakespeare's tragedy Romeo and Juliet.

== Plot ==
Between the two villages of Santa Veronica Bassa and Santa Veronica Alta there is a heated rivalry. When Gianni, a citizen of S.V. Bassa, falls in love with Juliet, a citizen of the enemy village, the two fractions collide with each other to prevent the engagement. The return of Pompeo, an explorer believed to have been lost in Africa for many years, manages to restore peace between the two lovers and the fractions.

== Cast ==
- Gianni Nazzaro: Gianni
- Agostina Belli: Giulietta Ciova
- Franco Scandurra: Pompeo Ciova
- Franco Franchi: Franco
- Ciccio Ingrassia: Ciccio
- Mario Maranzana: mayor
- Elio Crovetto: priest
- Umberto D'Orsi: On. Morbilloni
- Gigi Reder
- Didi Perego
- Enzo Andronico
- Tiberio Murgia
- Ignazio Leone
- Ugo Adinolfi
- Luca Sportelli
- Nino Vingelli

== See also ==
- List of Italian films of 1971
