= Oh! Those Most Secret Agents! =

- Directed by: Lucio Fulci
- Screenplay by: Vittorio Metz; Lucio Fulci; Amedeo Sollazzo
- Story by: Vittorio Metz
- Cinematography: Adalberto Albertini
- Edited by: Ornella Micheli
- Music by: Piero Umiliani
- Production company: Mega Film
- Distributed by: Panta Cinematografica Distribuzione
- Release date: October 28, 1964 (Bari)
- Running time: 90 minutes
- Country: Italy

Oh! Those Most Secret Agents! (Italian: 00-2 agenti segretissimi, lit. '00-2 Secret Agents') is a 1964 Italian film directed by Lucio Fulci starring the comic duo Franco and Ciccio. The film is the third of three comedies with the duo by the same director, with I due evasi di Sing Sing and I due pericoli pubblici, to be released in 1964, 00-2 agenti segretissimi being the only color film of the three.

It is a parody of 007 spy films, the first of four starring the comic duo Franco e Ciccio (the other being Simonelli's Due mafiosi contro Goldginger, Bava's Le spie vengono dal semifreddo and Fulci's Come rubammo la bomba atomica). The characters of the two thieves would also be present, also played by the Sicilian duo, but with different names, in Fulci's 002 Operazione Luna in 1965, a film that is sometimes presented as a sequel to 00-2 agenti segretissimi.

== Plot ==
Franco and Ciccio, two inept apartment thieves, fall into a trap set by American secret agents. The agents capture and then release them, planting a microfilm on them. The plan is simple: Franco and Ciccio must pose as the agents guarding the microfilm, attracting global spy attention. This diversion allows the real agents to deliver the original film smoothly.

However, the duo's clumsiness makes them look like dangerous spies, leading to a relentless chase. Additionally, the organizer discovers they accidentally have the real secret formula. Despite their constant misfortune, it unexpectedly saves them from numerous traps.

== Cast ==
- Franco Franchi as Franco
- Ciccio Ingrassia as Ciccio
- Ingrid Schoeller as Giulia Cirillo
- Poldo Bendandi as a Russian corporal
- Carla Calò as a Russian agent
- Luca Sportelli as the head of the secret service
- Aroldo Tieri as Nicola Cirillo, a jealous husband
- Enzo Andronico as a Russian agent
- Mary Arden as Nadia
- Nino Terzo as a Russian agent
- John Bartha as the electroshock doctor
- Pietro Ceccarelli as a Chinese henchman
- Harold Bradley as a Black gay bodybuilder
- Pietro Torrisi as a gay bodybuilder
- Mario Del Vago as a bespectacled Chinese man
- Annie Gorassini as a blonde Russian agent

== Production and release ==
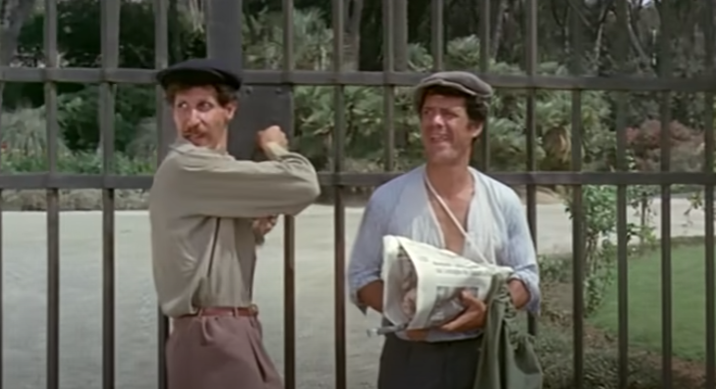
Franco and Ciccio in the film. It was director Lucio Fulci's first film shot in color.

The film was produced by Mega films. It is one of the 13 films directed by Fulci that star the Sicilian comic duo of Franco and Ciccio.

Shot by Adalberto Albertini, it was Fulci's first film made in color.

== Release ==
Oh! Those Mot Secret Agents was distributed theatrically in Italy with a 90 minute runtime by Panta Cinematografica Distribuzione. It was released in Italy across several cities including Bari on October 28, 1964 followed by screenings in Turin on November 3, and Rome on November 4.

Louis K. Sher purchased the rights to both Oh! Those Most Secret Agents and I due evasi di Sing Sing (1964) for distribution in the United States. Oh! Those Most Secret Agents was distributed first as 00-2 Secret Agent and later sold the film to Allied Artists. The latter company released Fulci's film in the United States in Texas as Oh! Those Most Secret Agents on June 23, 1966. This made it the first film with Franco and Ciccio and the first film by Lucio Fulci to be distributed in the United States.

== Reception ==
Stephen Thrower, in his book Beyond Terror (2018) said that the film was that well received on release. A reviewer in l'Unità said that the film was somewhat dull and even occasionally vulgar and objectionable.

Thrower commented that the film had a sunny and optimistic tone to it that prevented it from being another series of comedy pratfalls and facial contortions, summarizing that "if you only watch one Franco and Ciccio movie. I suggest you make it this one."
