= The Nephews of Zorro =

- Directed by: Marcello Ciorciolini
- Written by: Marcello Ciorciolini; Roberto Gianviti; Vittorio Metz; Dino Verde
- Cinematography: Tino Santoni
- Music by: Piero Umiliani
- Distributed by: Variety Distribution
- Release date: 12 December 1968
- Country: Italy
- Language: Italian

The Nephews of Zorro (Italian: I nipoti di Zorro, also known as The Cousins of Zorro) is a 1968 Italian comedy film directed by Marcello Ciorciolini starring the comic duo Franco and Ciccio.

== Plot ==
Franco and Ciccio are two Sicilian cousins who arrive in California with the intention of searching for gold, unaware that the infamous Zorro, a champion of the poor and the innocent, operates in the region. The two cousins accidentally fall into his hands while Zorro is freeing two prisoners who were unjustly imprisoned. Punished by Zorro with a Z branded on their backsides, the two Sicilian cousins arrive at the home of their uncle Diego De La Vega, not knowing that his son Raphael and Zorro are the same person.

The cousins are given money to disappear from sight, as they could compromise Zorro's identity since they’ve seen his clothes in Raphael’s room. But Franco and Ciccio are soon deceived by two conmen. Now poor again, the cousins are given more money by Zorro, who has just stolen a priceless treasure from the tyrannical judge who rules the town. But it’s right near the hiding place where Franco and Ciccio will start looking for gold and inevitably find the forbidden treasure.

Meanwhile, Carmencita, a great admirer of Zorro, doesn’t even imagine that he is her boyfriend Raphael, who tells her that the hero will meet her one evening. Happy, Carmencita waits eagerly for Zorro, unaware that her maid has tipped off the judge’s guards. At the same time, Franco and Ciccio find some of Zorro’s clothes and, learning of Carmencita’s planned meeting with the masked man, decide to impersonate him for the night. But the whole plan goes awry, and Carmencita ends up face-to-face with three Zorros. The guards, confused, don't know which one is the real Zorro and decide to arrest Franco and Ciccio since they cannot defend themselves. The next day, at the gallows, the two are about to be hanged when Zorro arrives to save them.

In the end, everything ends well, and the judge is arrested. As for Franco and Ciccio, they are sent as far away as possible with a pile of money, which will once again be stolen from them by two conmen.

== Cast ==
- Franco Franchi: Franco La Vacca
- Ciccio Ingrassia: Ciccio La Vacca
- Dean Reed: Don Rafael de la Vega/Zorro
- Agata Flori: Carmencita
- Ivano Staccioli: False Capitain Martinez
- Pedro Sanchez: Sgt. Alvarez
- Mario Maranzana: Richter Ramirez
- Franco Fantasia: Don Diego de la Vega
- Enzo Andronico: Kleptomane
- Evi Farinelli: Rosita
- Riccardo Pizzuti as Lancer
