= The Inconsolable Widow Thanks All Those Who Consoled Her =

1973 film

- Directed by: Mariano Laurenti
- Screenplay by: Giovanni Grimaldi
- Story by: Aldo Grimaldi
- Starring: Edwige Fenech
- Cinematography: Tino Santoni
- Edited by: Giuliana Attenni
- Music by: Bruno Nicolai
- Release date: 12 August 1973
- Language: Italian

The Inconsolable Widow Thanks All Those Who Consoled Her (Italian: La vedova inconsolabile ringrazia quanti la consolarono, also known as The Winsome Widow) is a 1973 commedia sexy all'italiana directed by Mariano Laurenti and starring Edwige Fenech.

== Plot ==
A beautiful young widow, Caterina, will only be able to benefit from her husband's huge inheritance if she gives birth to a child within the three hundred days stipulated by law. The two brothers of the husband will try in every way to impede it.

== Cast ==
- Edwige Fenech as Caterina Prevosti
- Carlo Giuffrè as Baron Carlo Niscemi
- Didi Perego as Francesca, Caterina's Mother
- Guido Leontini as Tano Santenocito
- Pino Ferrara as Nicolino Santenocito
- Enzo Andronico as Notary
- Franco Ressel as Caterina's Lawyer
- Mario Maranzana as Salvatore Santenocito
- Gino Pagnani as Picciotto

== Production ==
The film was shot between Catania, Acireale and Frascati.

== Reception ==
In Italy, the film grossed 692 million lira. It received mostly negative reviews from critics, with Claudio G. Fava referring to it as "the worst side of Italian mainstream cinema, devoid of any brightness and intelligence".
