= Ciccio Ingrassia =

Italian comedian (1922–2003)

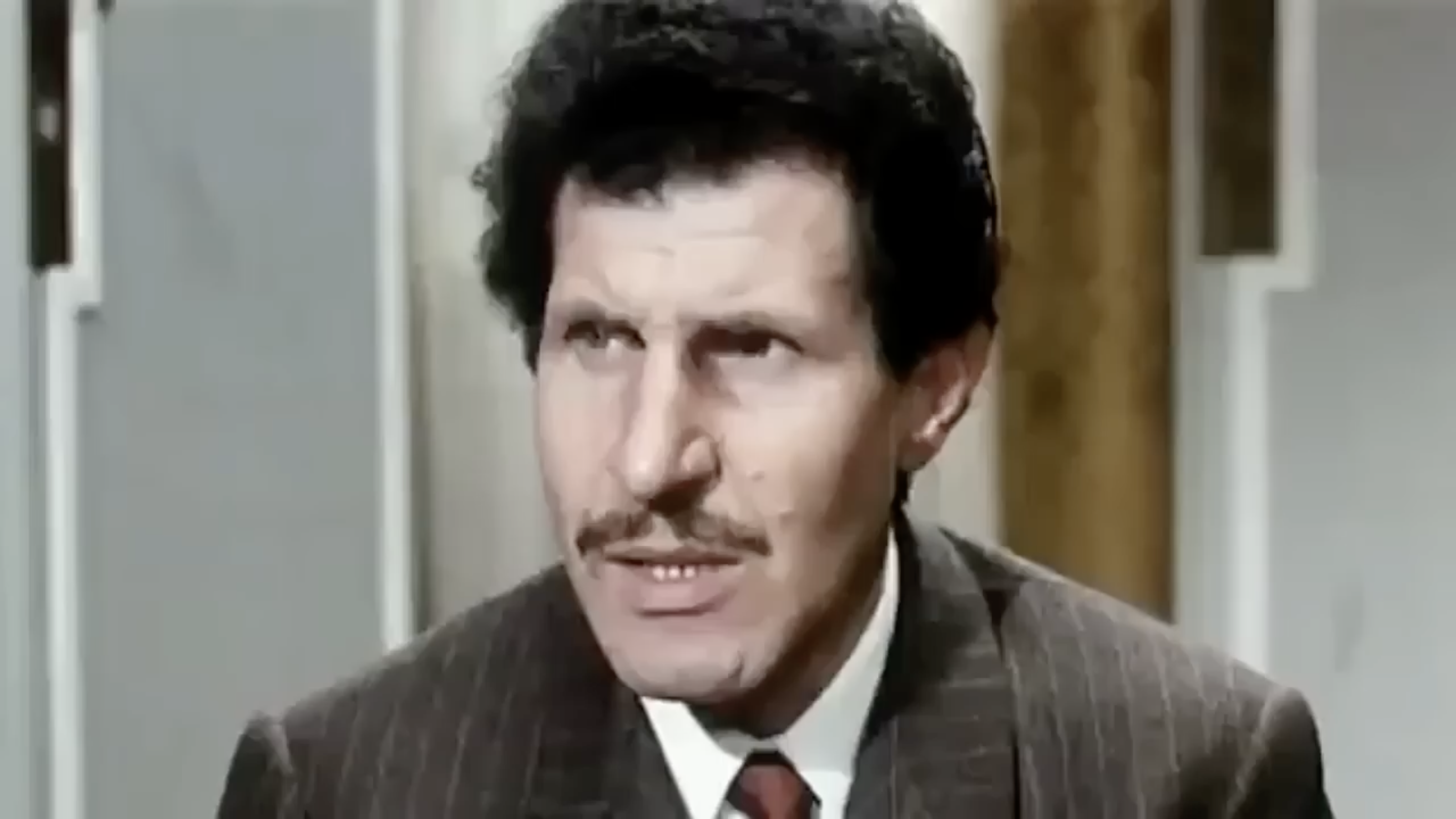
Ingrassia in the movie I 2 deputati (1968)

Francesco "Ciccio" Ingrassia (5 October 1922 – 28 April 2003) was an Italian actor, comedian and film director.

He was born in Palermo, Sicily, and began his career in the 1950s, although his career only really took off in the 1960s. He starred in many comedies, mainly appearing together with Franco Franchi as the comedy duo Franco and Ciccio. During the 1980s he also did television work. In the 1966 film Due Marines e un Generale (released internationally as War Italian Style), Franco and Ciccio worked with Buster Keaton.

== Filmography (with Franco Franchi) ==
- Appuntamento a Ischia (1960, directed by Mario Mattoli) as The Tall Smuggler
- L'onorata società (1961, directed by Riccardo Pazzaglia) as Rosolino
- 5 marines per 100 ragazze (1961, directed by Mario Mattoli) as Salvatore
- Il giudizio universale (1961, directed by Vittorio De Sica) as Unemployed man
- Maciste contro Ercole nella valle dei guai (1961, directed by Mario Mattoli) as Ingrassiade
- Gerarchi si muore (1961, directed by Giorgio Simonelli) as Cariddi
- Pugni pupe e marinai (1961, directed by Daniele D'Anza) as Rosario
- I tre nemici (1962, directed by Giorgio Simonelli) as Rocco
- I due della legione (1962, directed by Lucio Fulci) as Ciccio Fisichella
- 2 samurai per 100 geishe (1962, directed by Giorgio Simonelli) as Ciccio Santuzzo
- Le massaggiatrici (1962, directed by Lucio Fulci) as Ciccio - Nightwatchman #2
- I motorizzati (1962, directed by Camillo Mastrocinque)
- Il mio amico Benito (1962, directed by Giorgio Bianchi) as Terrorista
- Avventura al motel (1963, directed by Renato Polselli) as Ciccio
- Il giorno più corto (1963, directed by Sergio Corbucci) as Francesco Coppola
- La donna degli altri è sempre più bella (1963, directed by Marino Girolami) as Calogero Merendino (segment "I Promessi Sposi")
- Obiettivo ragazze (1963, directed by Mario Mattoli) as Ciccio
- Tutto è musica (1963, directed by Domenico Modugno) as Anemia
- Gli imbroglioni (1963, directed by Lucio Fulci) as Napoleone (segment "Siciliani")
- Scandali nudi (1963, directed by Enzo Di Gianni) as Poliziotto Ciccio Smith
- Vino, whisky e acqua salata (1963, directed by Mario Amendola)
- I maniaci (1964, directed by Lucio Fulci) as Thief #2 (segment 'Il week-end)
- Queste pazze pazze donne (1964, directed by Marino Girolami) as Ciccio Pipitone ('Siciliani a Milano')
- I marziani hanno dodici mani (1964, directed by Franco Castellano & Pipolo) as Lo scrittore di fantascienza
- Due mafiosi nel Far West (1964, directed by Giorgio Simonelli) as Ciccio Capone / Il nonno di Ciccio / Ciccia la sedotta
- Le sette vipere (1964, directed by Renato Polselli) as Lawyer Ingrassia
- L'amore primitivo (1964, directed by Luigi Scattini) as Ciccio, Hotel Porter
- I due evasi di Sing Sing (1964, directed by Lucio Fulci) as Ciccio Bacalone
- Cadavere per signora (1964, directed by Mario Mattoli) as Luigi
- Amore facile (1964, directed by Gianni Puccini) as Ciccio (segment "Un uomo corretto")
- Oh! Those Most Secret Agents! (1964, directed by Lucio Fulci) as Ciccio Passalacqua
- Sedotti e bidonati (1964, directed by Giorgio Bianchi) as Ciccio
- Un mostro e mezzo (1964, directed by Steno) as The Professor
- I due mafiosi (1964, directed by Giorgio Simonelli) as Ciccio Spampinato
- Le tardone (1964, directed by Marino Girolami) as The killer (episode "Un delitto quasi perfetto")
- I due toreri (1964, directed by Giorgio Simonelli) as Ciccio Scontentezza
- Canzoni, bulli e pupe (1964, directed by Carlo Infascelli)
- Due mattacchioni al Moulin Rouge (1964, directed by Giuseppe Vari) as Il falso poliziotto
- I due pericoli pubblici (1964, directed by Lucio Fulci) as Ciccio Introlia
- Io uccido, tu uccidi (1965, directed by Gianni Puccini) as Alfio (segment "Cavalleria Rusticana, oggi") / Ciccio (segment "Una boccata di fumo")
- Soldati e caporali (1965, directed by Mario Amendola) as Ciccio
- Letti sbagliati (1965, directed by Steno) as Se stesso (segment "La seconda moglie")
- Per un pugno nell'occhio (1965, directed by Michele Lupo) as Ciccio
- I figli del leopardo (1965, directed by Sergio Corbucci) as Ciccio / Baron Fifi
- Gli amanti latini (1965, directed by Mario Costa) as Ciccio (segment "Gli amanti latini")
- I due sergenti del generale Custer (1965, directed by Giorgio Simonelli) as Ciccio La Pera
- Come inguaiammo l'esercito (1965, directed by Lucio Fulci) as Sgt. Camilloni
- Due mafiosi contro Goldginger (1965, directed by Giorgio Simonelli) as Ciccio Pecora
- 00-2 Operazione Luna (1965, directed by Lucio Fulci) as Ciccio Cacace / Major Borovin
- Due marines e un generale (1965, directed by Luigi Scattini) as Joe Acampora
- I due parà (1965, directed by Lucio Fulci) as Ciccio Impallomeni
- Veneri al sole (1965, directed by Marino Girolami) as Francesco Pattané (segment "Una domenica a Fregene")
- Due mafiosi contro Al Capone (1966, directed by Giorgio Simonelli) as Ciccio
- How to Rob the Bank of Italy (1966, directed by Lucio Fulci) as Ciccio
- Dr. Goldfoot and the Girl Bombs (1966, directed by Mario Bava, [2]) as Ciccio
- I due figli di Ringo (1966, directed by Giorgio Simonelli e Giuliano Carnimeo) as Ciccio Magrì / Gringo
- Veneri in collegio, (1966, directed by Marino Girolami) as Ciccio Barbi
- I due sanculotti (1966, directed by Giorgio Simonelli) as Ciccio La Capra
- Come rubammo la bomba atomica (1967, directed by Lucio Fulci) as Ciccio
- Il lungo, il corto, il gatto (1967, directed by Lucio Fulci) as Ciccio
- Il bello, il brutto, il cretino (1967, directed by Giovanni Grimaldi) as Il cretino - Ciccio Ingrassy
- Due Rrringos nel Texas (1967, directed by Marino Girolami) as Sgt. Ciccio Stevens
- Stasera mi butto (1967, directed by Ettore Maria Fizzarotti) as Bath attendant
- I barbieri di Sicilia (1967, directed by Marcello Ciorciolini) as Ciccio Lo Persico
- Nel sole (1967, directed by Aldo Grimaldi) as Ciccio
- I Zanzaroni (1967, directed by Ugo La Rosa) (segment "Quelli qui restano")
- I due vigili (1967, directed by Giuseppe Orlandini)
- Gli altri, gli altri e noi (1967, directed by Maurizio Arena)
- Brutti di notte (1968, directed by Giovanni Grimaldi) as Ciccio - Rosaspina Brother
- L'oro del mondo (1968, directed by Aldo Grimaldi) as Ciccio - grocer
- Franco, Ciccio e le vedove allegre (1968, directed by Marino Girolami) as Ciccio Fulgenzi
- American Secret Service (1968, directed by Enzo Di Gianni)
- Capriccio all'italiana (1968, directed by Mauro Bolognini, Mario Monicelli, Pier Paolo Pasolini, Steno, Franco Rossi) as Roderigo (segment "Che cosa sono le nuvole?")
- Don Chisciotte and Sancio Panza (1968, directed by Giovanni Grimaldi) as Don Quixote
- Ciccio perdona... Io no! (1968, directed by Marcello Ciorciolini) as Ciccio
- I nipoti di Zorro (1968, directed by Marcello Ciorciolini) as Ciccio La Vacca
- I due crociati (1968, directed by Giuseppe Orlandini) as Ciccio Visconte di Braghelunge
- I due pompieri (1968, directed by Bruno Corbucci) as Ciccio Barrese
- I due deputati (1968, directed by Giovanni Grimaldi) as Dott. Francesco Grassiani
- Indovina chi viene a merenda? (1969, directed by Marcello Ciorciolini) as Ciccio La Rapa
- I due magnifici fresconi (un imbroglio tutto curve) (1969, directed by Marino Girolami) as Ciccio
- Franco, Ciccio e il pirata Barbanera (1969, directed by Mario Amendola) as Ciccio
- Franco e Ciccio... ladro e guardia (1969, directed by Marcello Ciorciolini) as Ciccio Chiappalone
- Lisa dagli occhi blu (1970, directed by Bruno Corbucci) as 'Centro Spaziale' Manager (uncredited)
- Satiricosissimo (1970, directed by Mariano Laurenti) as Ciccio
- Franco e Ciccio sul sentiero di guerra (1970, directed by Aldo Grimaldi) as Ciccio Spampinato
- Don Franco e Don Ciccio nell'anno della contestazione (1970, directed by Marino Girolami) as Don Ciccio
- Ma chi t'ha dato la patente? (1970, directed by Nando Cicero) as Cicco
- W le donne (1970, directed by Aldo Grimaldi) as Ciccio La Rosa
- I due maghi del pallone (1970, directed by Mariano Laurenti) as Ciccio Ingrassetti
- Principe coronato cercasi per ricca ereditiera (1970, directed by Giovanni Grimaldi) as Francesco
- Nel giorno del Signore (1970, directed by Bruno Corbucci) as Carceriere
- I due Maggiolini più matti del mondo (1970, directed by Giuseppe Orlandini) as Ciccio
- Due bianchi nell'Africa nera (1970, directed by Bruno Corbucci) as Ciccio Rapisarda
- Mazzabubù... Quante corna stanno quaggiù? (1971, directed by Mariano Laurenti) as Ciccio Merendino
- Ma che musica maestro (1971, directed by Mariano Laurenti) as Ciccio - Municipal policeman
- I due della Formula Uno alla corsa più pazza pazza del mondo (1971, directed by Osvaldo Civirani) as Ciccio
- Venga a fare il soldato da noi (1971, directed by Ettore Maria Fizzarotti) as Maresciallo La Rosa
- Riuscirà l'avvocato Franco Benenato a sconfiggere il suo acerrimo nemico il pretore Ciccio De Ingras? (1971, directed by Mino Guerrini) as Ciccio de Ingras
- Armiamoci e partite! (1971, directed by Nando Cicero) as Ciccio
- I due pezzi da 90 (1971, directed by Osvaldo Civirani)
- I due assi del guantone (1971, directed by Mariano Laurenti) as Ciccio Trapani
- Scusi, ma lei le paga le tasse? (1971, directed by Mino Guerrini) as Dott. Felice Cavaterra
- Il clan dei due Borsalini (1971, directed by Giuseppe Orlandini) as Prof. Francesco Ingrassini
- The Sicilian Checkmate (1972, directed by Florestano Vancini) as Ferdinando Giacalone
- Two Sons of Trinity (1972, directed by Osvaldo Civirani) as Ciccio Trinità
- I due gattoni a nove code... e mezza ad Amsterdam (1972, directed by Osvaldo Civirani) as Ciccio
- The Adventures of Pinocchio (1972, TV miniseries directed by Luigi Comencini and also edited into a theatrical film) as the Fox
- Storia di fifa e di coltello - Er seguito d' Er Più (1972, directed by Mario Amendola) as Ciccio Pennisi
- Continuavano a chiamarli i due piloti più matti del mondo (1972, directed by Mariano Laurenti) as Ciccio Ingrassetti
- Continuavano a chiamarli... er più e er meno (1972, directed by Giuseppe Orlandini) as Francesco Ribanera Mendoza d'Espinoza
- Amarcord (1973, directed by Federico Fellini) as Teo
- Farfallon (1974, directed by Riccardo Pazzaglia) as Barone di Vistacorta
- Paolo il freddo (1974, directed by Ciccio Ingrassia)
- Bianchi cavalli d'Agosto (1975, directed by Raimondo Del Balzo) as Fisherman
- Dracula in the Provinces (1975, directed by Lucio Fulci) as Salvatore, the Wizard of Noto
- L'Esorciccio (1975, directed by Ciccio Ingrassia) as L'Esorciccio
- Todo modo (1976, directed by Elio Petri) as Voltrano
- Traffic Jam (1979, directed by Luigi Comencini) as Ambulance sick man
- Crema, cioccolata e pa... prika (1981, directed by Michele Massimo Tarantini) as Ossobuco
- Kaos (1984, directed by Paolo & Vittorio Taviani, from the tales by Luigi Pirandello) as Don Lollò (segment "La giara")
- La Bohème (1988, directed by Luigi Comencini) as Parpignol
- It's Happening Tomorrow (1988, directed by Daniele Luchetti) as Gianloreto Bonacci
- Viaggio d'amore (1990, directed by Ottavio Fabbri) as The Priest
- Captain Fracassa's Journey (1990, directed by Ettore Scola) as Pietro, Sigognac's servant
- Condominio (1991, directed by Felice Farina) as Mar. Gaetano Scarfi
- La via del cibo (1994, directed by Eugenio Donadoni) as Il Grande Maestro
- Camerieri (1995, directed by Leone Pompucci) as Loppi
- Giovani e belli (1996, directed by Dino Risi) as Re degli Zingari
- Fatal Frames - Fotogrammi mortali (1996, directed by Al Festa) as Beggar (final film role)
