= Ciccio Forgives, I Don't =

1968 film

- Film poster
- Directed by: Marcello Ciorciolini
- Written by: Marcello Ciorciolini; Amedeo Sollazzo
- Starring: Franco Franchi; Ciccio Ingrassia
- Cinematography: Sandro D'Eva
- Music by: Roberto Pregadio
- Production company: West Film
- Release date: 26 September 1968
- Running time: 100 minutes
- Country: Italy
- Language: Italian

Ciccio perdona... Io no! (internationally known as Ciccio Forgives, I Don't) is a 1968 Italian comedy film directed by Marcello Ciorciolini starring the comic duo Franco and Ciccio. It is a Spaghetti Western parody of God Forgives... I Don't!.

== Cast ==
- Franco Franchi: Franco
- Ciccio Ingrassia: Ciccio
- Adriano Micantoni: Angel Face
- Fernando Sancho: El Diablo
- Mario Maranzana: Lightning
- Gia Sandri: Calamity Jane
- Luca Sportelli: Barkeeper
