= When Women Were Called Virgins =

1972 film by Aldo Grimaldi

- Directed by: Aldo Grimaldi
- Written by: Giovanni Grimaldi
- Story by: Aldo Grimaldi
- Starring: Edwige Fenech; Vittorio Caprioli
- Cinematography: Angelo Lotti
- Edited by: Daniele Alabiso
- Music by: Giorgio Gaslini
- Release date: 1972
- Language: Italian

When Women Were Called Virgins (Italian: Quando le donne si chiamavano madonne) is a 1972 commedia sexy all'italiana written and directed by Aldo Grimaldi. It is part of a series of derivative erotic comedies set in the Middle Ages which were based on the success of Pier Paolo Pasolini's The Decameron.

== Plot ==
During the Middle Ages, the young Gisippo, Ruberto and Tazio go to Prato to attend the trial of Giulia, guilty of having betrayed her husband Romildo (lazy and too "fast" during the sexual act) and for which she is expected to be sentenced to the stake. Giulia, however, beautiful and convincing, touches the judge's heart and gets permission to try again to make love once more before being sentenced. Since one of the three young men supported Giulia's apology during the trial, Romildo's uncle invites them to his house where he offers him the opportunity to indulge in the most unbridled and vulgar pleasures with three eager girls his guests and named Peronella, Francesca and Lucia.

Although Peronella readily gives herself to Tazio, the other two young men are not so lucky — Francesca has a very jealous uncle, a friar (even if in reality he is a great pleasure-seeker) while Lucia is afraid of confronting the other sex. Gisippo and Ruberto disguise themselves as women and manage to successfully overcome the girls' fears. In the end, the three boys continue to pursue their sexual adventures, while Madonna Giulia decides to offer her favors as a great seductress and prostitute to Judge Don Cecco in return for acquittal.

== Cast ==
- Edwige Fenech as Giulia Varrone
- Vittorio Caprioli as Ser Cecco
- Stefania Careddu as Francesca
- Don Backy as Marcuzio dei Lucani
- Jürgen Drews as Ruberto
- Paolo Turco as Tazio
- Antonia Brancati as Lucia
- Mario Carotenuto as Quinto Fulvo
- Carlo De Mejo as Gisippo
- Francesca Benedetti as Gisa
- Peter Berling as Romildo Varrone
- Carletto Sposito as Friar Mariaccio
- Eva Garden as Peronella

== See also ==
- List of Italian films of 1972
