= Nel sole (film) =

- Directed by: Aldo Grimaldi
- Written by: Mario Amendola; Bruno Corbucci; Giovanni Grimaldi
- Starring: Al Bano; Romina Power; Linda Christian; Carlo Giordana; Hélène Chanel; Nino Taranto; Antonella Steni; Franco Franchi; Ciccio Ingrassia
- Cinematography: Claudio Ragona
- Music by: Pino Massara
- Distributed by: Titanus
- Release date: 1967
- Country: Italy
- Language: Italian

Nel sole is a 1967 Italian musical romantic comedy film directed by Aldo Grimaldi. The title is a reference to the Al Bano's hit song with the same name.

== Cast ==
- Al Bano: Carlo Carrera
- Romina Power: Lorena Vivaldi
- Linda Christian: Laura Vivaldi
- Franco Franchi: Franco Sparapaoli
- Ciccio Ingrassia: Ciccio
- Carlo Giordana: Giorgio Castelli
- Hélène Chanel: Ivana Vannucci
- Antonella Steni: Teacher of Art History
- Nino Taranto: Professor of Physics
- Mirella Pamphili: Attilia
- Enrico Montesano: Francesco Alessandroni
- Loretta Goggi: Cantini
- Enzo Maggio: Giacomo
- Vincenzo Crocitti: Student
