= Per un pugno nell'occhio =

- Original film poster
- Directed by: Michele Lupo
- Written by: Roberto Gianviti, Amedeo Solazzo, Michele Lupo
- Produced by: Roberto Amoroso
- Starring: Franco Franchi & Ciccio Ingrassia
- Music by: Francesco De Masi
- Distributed by: Variety Distribution
- Release date: 1965
- Running time: 100 minutes
- Country: Italy
- Language: Italian

Per un pugno nell'occhio is a 1965 Italian film by Michele Lupo starring the comic duo Franco and Ciccio. It is a Spaghetti Western parody of Fistful of Dollars and was also known as Fistful of Knuckles and For a Fist in the Eye.

== Plot ==
Fitting atmosphere in the Wild West, the film tells the story of Franco and Ciccio, two well-known arms dealers who come to a desolate village where peace reigns. Since the social situation is very quiet, the buddies start with cunning stratagems to get everyone against each other to unleash a veritable pandemonium and be able to make money.

== Cast ==
- Franco Franchi as Franco
- Ciccio Ingrassia as Ciccio
- Paco Morán as Ramon Cocos
- Lina Rosales as Consuelo
- Carmen Esbrí as Marisol
- Mónica Randall as Carmencita (as Aurora Julia)
