= Come inguaiammo l'esercito =

1965 film directed by Lucio Fulci

- Directed by: Lucio Fulci
- Screenplay by: Roberto Gianviti; Amedeo Sollazzo
- Story by: Alfonso Brescia; Franco D'Este
- Starring: Franco Franchi; Ciccio Ingrassia; Luigi Pavese
- Cinematography: Angelo Lotti
- Edited by: Ornella Micheli
- Music by: Enzo Leoni
- Production company: Five Film
- Distributed by: Euro International Films
- Release date: August 21, 1965 (Rome)
- Running time: 89 minutes
- Country: Italy

Come inguaiammo l'esercito (lit. 'How We Got in Trouble with the Army') is a black-and-white 1965 Italian comedy film directed by Lucio Fulci starring Franco and Ciccio.

== Plot ==
Nick Moroni, a young singer called up, learns that his wife Catherine is about to leave for America, taking with her their son. So he abducts the baby and takes him to the police station, asking a soldier named Piscitello to keep him well hidden. Sgt. Camilloni discovers the child and is led to believe he is the father, and asks Piscitello to keep the boy well hidden. Piscitello naturally takes advantage of the situation to blackmail the sergeant, demanding concessions to no end and subjecting him to endless harassment.

== Cast ==
- Remo Germani as Nick Moroni
- Alicia Brandet as Catherine
- Gina Rovere as Mariuccia
- Umberto D'Orsi as Hamlet
- Luigi Pavese as Gen. MacKee
- Andrea Scotti as Captain
- Alvaro Alvisi
- Consalvo Dell'Arti as Investigator
- Edy Nogara
- Francesco Sormano as Colonel
- Nino Terzo
- Lino Banfi as Corporal
- Moira Orfei as Taide
- Franco Franchi as Franco Piscitello
- Ciccio Ingrassia as Sgt. Camilloni

== Production ==
Come inguaiammo l'esercito was an Italian production by the Rome-based Five Film.

== Release ==
Come inguaiammo l'esercito was distributed in Italy by Euro International Films with an 89 minute running time. It was released in Rome on August 21, 1965. It was later released in Turin on August 27, Taranto on September 25 and Bari on October 1.
