= I due toreri =

- Directed by: Giorgio Simonelli
- Written by: Marcello Ciorciolini; Dino Verde; Roberto Gianviti
- Starring: Franco Franchi; Ciccio Ingrassia
- Cinematography: Luciano Trasatti
- Edited by: Franco Fraticelli
- Music by: Gianni Ferrio
- Distributed by: Variety Distribution
- Release date: 1965
- Running time: 110 minutes
- Countries: Italy; Spain
- Language: Italian

I due toreri (Spanish: Dos toreros de aúpa) is a 1965 Italian-Spanish comedy film directed by Giorgio Simonelli starring the comic duo Franco and Ciccio.

== Plot ==
In Sicily Franco and Ciccio are empowered by a local mafia man to guard for a wide range of salad. In reality however this is not simple salad vegetables but marijuana; the two bungling fools and friends do not realize it at first. Indeed, seeing that with this delicious salad could make us profits, steal it and are discovered by the police. The policemen, discovering the marijuana, would stop Franco and Ciccio which however manage admirably to escape and to embark for Spain. There are exchanged for two famous bullfighters and sent to compete with ferocious bulls in bullfights.

== Cast ==
- Franco Franchi as Franco Scontentezza
- Ciccio Ingrassia as Ciccio Scontentezza
- Fernando Sancho as Don Alonso
- Rossella Como as Dolores
- Silvia Solar as Margaret
- Maria Teresa Vianello as Paulette
- Elisa Montés as Manuela
- Carlo Romano as Joe Ragusa
- Nino Terzo as Jannot
- Eduardo Fajardo as Inspector N.B.
- Tom Felleghy as Pierre (as Tom Felleghi)
- Gino Buzzanca as Maresciallo
- Enzo Fiermonte as Ship Captain
- Rosalia Maggio
- Enzo Andronico
