= Indovina chi viene a merenda? =

- Directed by: Marcello Ciorciolini
- Written by: Marcello Ciorciolini; Amedeo Sollazzo
- Produced by: Italo Zingarelli
- Starring: Franco Franchi; Ciccio Ingrassia
- Cinematography: Tino Santoni
- Music by: Roberto Pregadio
- Release date: 1969
- Running time: 93 minutes
- Country: Italy
- Language: Italian

Indovina chi viene a merenda? (i.e. "Guess who's coming to tea?") is a 1969 Italian war-comedy film written and directed by Marcello Ciorciolini and starring the comic duo Franco and Ciccio.

== Plot ==
Sicily 1943: to avoid war, Franco and Ciccio hid in the mountains. Two American paratroopers steal their clothes and leave them their uniforms in exchange, so our "heroes" are captured by the Germans and deported to Germany. They will escape, take refuge on a farm and be the protagonists of chain misadventures. After the war, believed dead, they are safe and sound up there in Germany.

== Cast ==
- Franco Franchi as Franco La Rapa
- Ciccio Ingrassia as Ciccio La Rapa
- Mimmo Palmara as Comm. Tiger
- Carlo Romano as Otto Bauer
- Giacomo Rossi Stuart as Camp Commandant
- Jon Chevron as Cpt. Sidney
- Toni Ucci as Commander of the Paratroopers
- Laetitia Le Hir as Martha Bauer
- Ivana Novak as Annelore Bauer
- Ignazio Leone as Mayor of Montefriddu
- Lino Banfi as Owl Man
- Luigi Bonos as German Soldier
