= Anna Maria Bottini =

Italian actress (1916–2020)

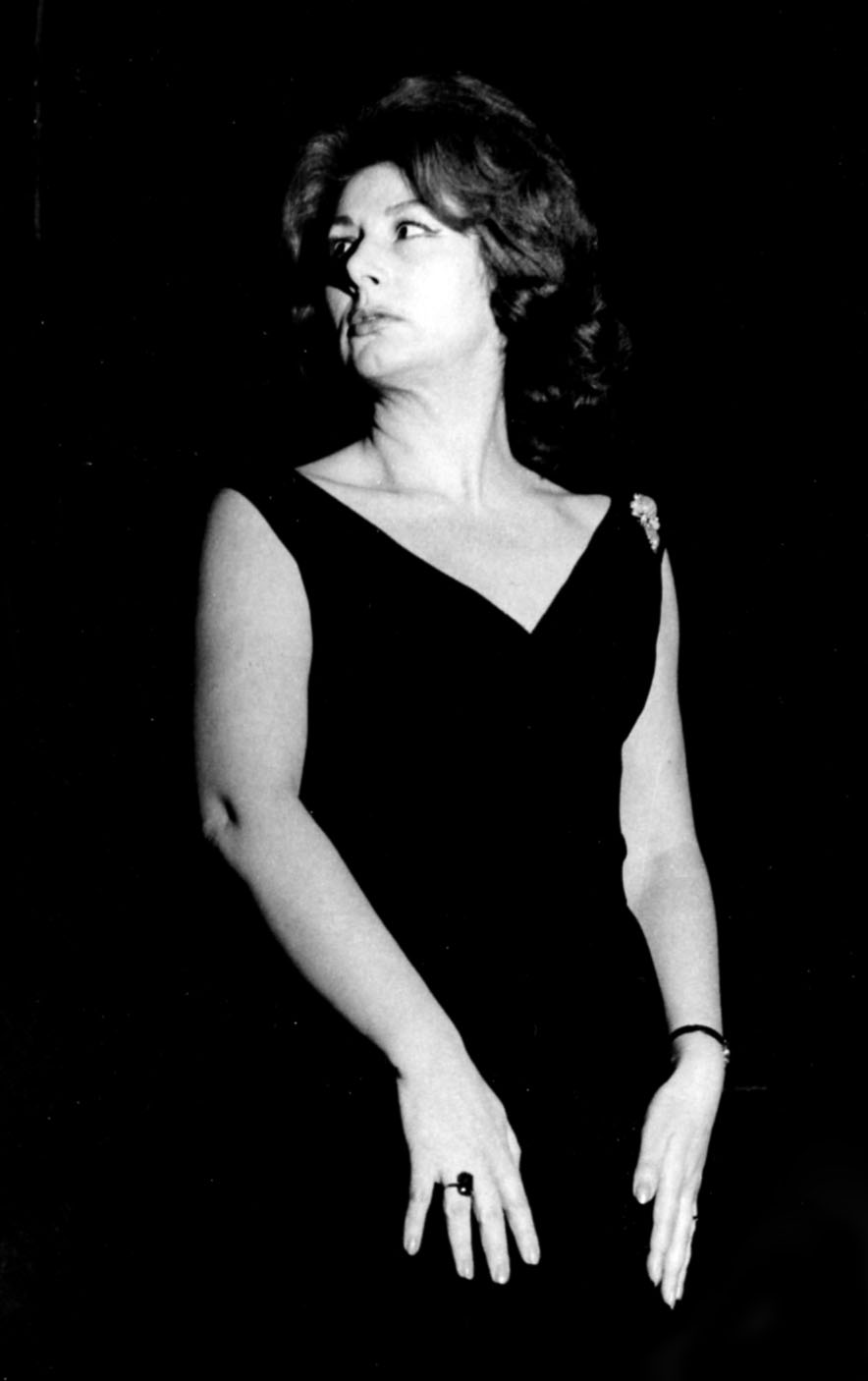
- Born: 24 March 1916; Milan, Lombardy, Italy
- Died: 9 August 2020 (aged 104); Giove, Umbria, Italy
- Occupation: Actress
- Years active: 1938–1993

Anna Maria Bottini (24 March 1916 – 9 August 2020) was an Italian actress.

Bottini attended the Accademia dei Filodrammatici in Milan, where she graduated in 1936, beginning her acting career at the end of World War II. A character actress, Bottini worked in dozens of films, also collaborating with directors such as Luchino Visconti, for whom she starred in The Leopard. Bottini abandoned the film activity in the early 1980s, turning exclusively to the theatre.

Bottini died on 9 August 2020, at the age of 104.

== Partial filmography ==
- The Sons of the Marquis Lucera (1938)
- Altura (1949)
- Songs in the Streets (1950)
- La paura fa 90 (1951)
- Abbiamo vinto! (1951)
- The Walk (1953)
- Angels of Darkness (1953)
- The Law (1959)
- The Overtaxed (1959)
- The Leopard (1963)
- The Swindlers (1963)
- A Monster and a Half (1964)
- Rugantino (1973)
