= Letti sbagliati =

- Directed by: Steno
- Written by: Sandro Continenza
- Music by: Carlo Rustichelli
- Release date: 1965
- Running time: 98 minutes
- Country: Italy
- Language: Italian

Letti sbagliati is a 1965 Italian comedy film directed by Steno starring the comic duo Franco and Ciccio. The film consists of four segments or episodes, much like sketch comedy.

== Cast ==
- Franco Franchi ... (segment "La seconda moglie")
- Ciccio Ingrassia ... (segment "La seconda moglie")
- Lando Buzzanca ... (segment "Il complicato")
- Aldo Giuffrè ... (segment "Il complicato")
- Pietro Tordi ... (segment "Il complicato")
- Margaret Lee ... (segment "00-Sexy, missione bionda platino")
- Raimondo Vianello ... (segment "00-Sexy, missione bionda platino")
- Fulvia Franco ... (segment "00-Sexy, missione bionda platino")
- Piero Morgia ... (segment "00-Sexy, missione bionda platino")
- Carlo Giuffrè ... (segment "Quel porco di Maurizio")
- Beba Lončar ... (segment "Quel porco di Maurizio")
- Aldo Puglisi ... (segment "Quel porco di Maurizio")
- Tecla Scarano ... (segment "Quel porco di Maurizio")
- Ingeborg Schöner ... (segment "Il complicato").
