= The Exorcist: Italian Style =

L'esorciccio
- Directed by: Ciccio Ingrassia
- Written by: Ciccio Ingrassia; Marino Onorati
- Starring: Ciccio Ingrassia; Lino Banfi
- Cinematography: Guglielmo Mancori
- Music by: Franco Godi
- Release date: 1975
- Running time: 90 min.
- Country: Italy
- Language: Italian

L'esorciccio (internationally released as The Exorcist: Italian Style and The Exorciccio; the title puns on "Ciccio," a hypocorism of Francesco) is a 1975 Italian Horror comedy film written, directed, produced and starring Ciccio Ingrassia.

A parody of William Friedkin's The Exorcist (1973), it is the second and last film directed by Ingrassia after Paolo il freddo (a parody of Paolo il caldo).

In the film, an amulet of Beelzebub is located in Iran. Once transported to Italy, it causes the spirit possession of a mayor's son. Following a rape performed by the possessed boy, an exorcist is summoned. The evil spirit keeps changing host bodies, and eventually possesses the exorcist himself. The exorcist vanishes at the film's end.

== Plot ==
In Iran at an archaeological site, an amulet depicting a small head of Beelzebub is recovered.

The trinket is then lost and unearthed, in a small rural town near Rome, by a kid during a football match. The kid immediately manifests signs of spirit possession, felling a tree with the football and then forcing himself on a peasant girl in a nearby field. The following day the girl's parents ask for a reparation marriage but the kid's father (the town's mayor seeking re-election) dismisses their claims as a set-up to damage his reputation.

However, later, he is shocked to find evidence of the uncontrollable urges of the possessed boy; after having called the doctor (to no avail) he is forced to ask for the assistance of the notorious "Exorciccio", a lay demon-hunter.

The Exorciccio, aided by his bumbling assistant 'Satanetto' (lil'Satan) manages to exorcise the boy, his sister and finally the Mayor's wife, who all in sequence come into contact with the diabolical amulet. In the end it is the Mayor himself who ends up under its thrall during the celebrations for his re-election. The man, now possessed, shocks the crowd by urinating on the bystanders and performing a 'satanic' rock song, causing a furore during which the amulet is yet again lost and found, first by Dr. Schnautzer (the Mayor's physician) who briefly turns into a Hitler-esque figure. Finally, the accursed amulet is swallowed by the Exorciccio himself.

In the final scene the Mayor complains that the supernatural events so far occurred must have a diabolical origin; the Exorciccio (now possessed) rebukes putting in doubt the existence of the Devil, before vanishing in a plume of smoke.

== Cast ==
- Ciccio Ingrassia as the Exorciccio
- Lino Banfi as Pasqualino Abate
- Mimmo Baldi as Satanetto
- Didi Perego as Annunziata, Pasqualino's wife
- Barbara Nascimbene as Barbara Abate
- Gigi Bonos as Dr. Schnautzer
- Tano Cimarosa as Turi Randazzo
- Ubaldo Lay as Lt. Sheridan
- Salvatore Baccaro as Satanetto's mother
- Dante Cleri as Antonio Sgrò
- Renato Malavasi as Monsignor Evaristo
- Franca Haas as Margherita
- Ada Pometti as Domestica
- Lorenzo Piani as Armando

== Production ==
Due to Italian cultural sensibilities of the time, there are no mentions of organized religion or the Catholic Church in the film, although the Exorciccio wears clothes vaguely resembling priestly ones.
