= I 2 deputati =

- Directed by: Giovanni Grimaldi
- Written by: Giovanni Grimaldi
- Produced by: Edmondo Amati
- Starring: Franco Franchi; Ciccio Ingrassia
- Cinematography: Riccardo Pallottini
- Music by: Piero Umiliani
- Release date: 1968
- Country: Italy
- Language: Italian

I 2 deputati (Italian for "The two deputies") is a 1968 comedy film written and directed by Giovanni Grimaldi and starring the comic duo Franco and Ciccio.

== Plot ==
Francesco Grassiani and Franco Franchini are two brothers-in-law living in the same building and working in the same office. Despite residing in close quarters, their occupations could not be more different – Francesco is a prominent politician, while Franco is a humble usher. With political elections on the horizon, Grassiani decides to run with the Christian Democracy party. Upon hearing this, the leaders of the Italian Communist Party (PCI) suggest that Franco run as an independent candidate for the PCI. Initially hesitant, Franco sees himself as too ignorant and too Catholic for the party, but he eventually agrees on his wife's advice.

What follows is a no-holds-barred political campaign between the two. They attempt to steal each other's speeches, Franco tries to create discord between Francesco and the Christian Democracy party, and a "hitman" from Grassiani disrupts Franco's final election speech. The intense political clash concludes with the election of the communist candidate, Franchini. While Franchini's wife tries to reconcile with her sister-in-law, her efforts lead to a brawl between the two families. In the midst of the chaos, a Christian Democracy party leader enters, informing Grassiani of the death of a recently elected centrist deputy. Consequently, Francesco, as the highest-ranking non-elected candidate, gains entry to Parliament.

== Cast ==
- Franco Franchi as Franco Franchini
- Ciccio Ingrassia as Francesco Grassiani
- Gabriella Giorgelli as Rosa
- Franca Maria Giardina as Rita
- Paolo Carlini as Dr. Bianchini
- Didi Perego as Grassiani's Secretary
- Umberto D'Orsi as Ugo Latterin
- Ignazio Leone as Franco's Colleague
- Alfredo Rizzo as Dr. Lucarini
- Renato Malavasi as Commendator Frascati
- Ignazio Balsamo as PCI Member
- Oreste Palella as PCI Member
- Enzo Andronico as PCI Member
- Guido Spadea as DC Member
- Lino Banfi as Franco's Friend
- Enzo Maggio as The Doorman
- Luca Sportelli as Journalist
