= The Two Crusaders =

1968 film

- Directed by: Giuseppe Orlandini
- Written by: Roberto Gianviti; Dino Verde; Lucio Fulci
- Produced by: Fulvio Lucisano
- Starring: Franco Franchi; Ciccio Ingrassia
- Cinematography: Franco Delli Colli
- Music by: Lallo Gori
- Release date: 1968
- Running time: 100 minutes
- Language: Italian

The Two Crusaders (Italian: I due crociati) is a 1968 comedy film directed by Giuseppe Orlandini, co-written by Lucio Fulci and starring the comic duo Franco and Ciccio.

== Plot ==
Viscount Ciccio is on the bill, so the people who live in his lands begin to stop paying his taxes. So he goes in search of a soldier of fortune to threaten the plebs and collect the money. Ciccio manages to find him, but soon he will understand that the man is suitable for everything except being a proper knight.

== Cast ==
- Franco Franchi as Franco di Carrapipi
- Ciccio Ingrassia as Ciccio Visconte di Braghelunge
- Janet Agren as Clorinda
- Fiorenzo Fiorentini as Ciccio's Consouler
- Umberto D'Orsi as Goffredo di Buglione
- Ignazio Leone as Biagio
- Marco Tulli as Fra Giulivo
- Nino Fuscagni as Richard the Pantherheart
- Gastone Pescucci
- Enzo Andronico as Man blind in one eye
- Fabio Testi as Warrior enlisting Franco and Ciccio
- Pietro Ceccarelli as Tazio
- Furio Meniconi as Saladin
- Loris Gizzi
- Paolo Poli as Narrator

== See also ==
- List of Italian films of 1968
