= I due sanculotti =

- Directed by: Giorgio Simonelli
- Written by: Marcello Ciorciolini; Dino Verde; Giorgio Simonelli
- Starring: Franco Franchi; Ciccio Ingrassia
- Cinematography: Tino Santoni
- Music by: Piero Umiliani
- Distributed by: Variety Distribution
- Release date: 1966
- Country: Italy
- Language: Italian

I due sanculotti (Italian for "The two sans-culottes") is a 1966 comedy film written and directed by Giorgio Simonelli starring the comic duo Franco and Ciccio.

== Plot ==
The brothers Franco and Ciccio La Capra moves to France in the days of the French Revolution, putting themselves in a lot of trouble.

== Cast ==
- Franco Franchi as Franco La Capra
- Ciccio Ingrassia as Ciccio La Capra
- Barbara Carroll as Virginia Carroll
- Heidi Hansen as Luisa
- Umberto D'Orsi as Deville
- Luigi Pavese as Francois
- Adriano Micantoni as Pierre
- Giustino Durano as Prof. Guillotin
- Oreste Lionello as Napoléon Bonaparte
- Mary Arden as Teresina
- Silvano Tranquilli as Politic Commissioner Robespierre
- Gino Buzzanca
