= Antonella Steni =

Italian actress (1926–2016)

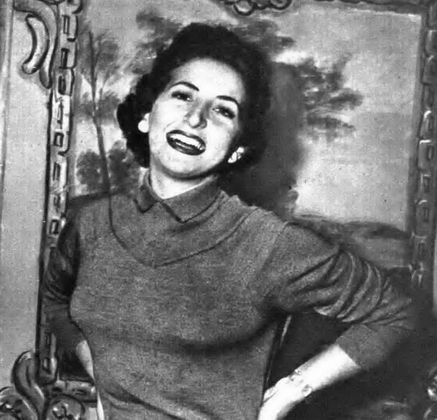
- Born: Antonietta Stefanini; 3 December 1926; Mantua, Kingdom of Italy
- Died: 18 January 2016 (aged 89); Bologna, Italy
- Occupation: Actress

Antonietta Stefanini (3 December 1926 – 18 January 2016), best known as Antonella Steni, was an Italian actress, voice actress, comedian and presenter.

== Career ==
Born in Montefiascone, Steni started her career as a child actress in the stage company led by Wanda Osiris. She debuted as a soubrette in 1942, in the revue Orlando Curioso.

In the 1950s Steni started a long collaboration in radio, on stage and later on television with Elio Pandolfi. They were both part of the company Teatro Comico Musicale di Radio Roma, and in the 1960s they got a large success with a series of satirical musical comedies written by Dino Verde, particularly Scanzonatissimo and Urgentissimo.

In the 1980s Steni formed a successful stage company together with Riccardo Garrone. Steni was also active in films and as a dubber.

== Filmography ==
Year	Title	Role	Notes
1937	Scipio Africanus: The Defeat of Hannibal	Una Bambina	
1938	Crispino e la comare	La bambina	
1957	Rascel-Fifì	La presentatrice televisiva	
1960	Le signore	Renato's wife	
1962	Nerone '71		
1963	Obiettivo ragazze	Francesca	
1963	Scanzonatissimo		
1964	2 mattacchioni al Moulin Rouge	Proprietaria locale	
1967	Le 7 cinesi d'oro	Simon, la spagnola	
1967	The Strange Night		
1967	The Tiger and the Pussycat	Pinella	
1967	Nel sole	Fine Arts Teacher	
1967	Peggio per me... meglio per te	Adriana, madre di Marisa	
1967	Addio mamma	Miss Picchi	
1968	Brutti di notte	Mazzacurati - the Millionaire	
1968	L'oro del mondo	Wife of Pugliese	
1968	Colpo di sole		
1969	Il ragazzo che sorride	Tilde - wife of Filippo	
1969	Pensando a te		
1970	La ragazza del prete	De Magistris	
1971	Bastard, Go and Kill	Asuncion Juanita Maria Magdalena Hermadariz	
1973	Hospitals: The White Mafia	Enrico's Wife	
1986	Grandi magazzini	Vedova Martuccelli	
1998	Kaputt Mundi	Elsa Giovannini	
1998	Frigidaire - Il film	Baroness von Hesserling	
