= 4 Dollars of Revenge =

1965 film by Alfonso Balcázar

- Directed by: Alfonso Balcázar; Jaime Jesús Balcázar
- Written by: Jaime Jesús Balcázar; José Antonio de la Loma
- Screenplay by: Bruno Corbucci; Aldo Grimaldi; Giovanni Grimaldi
- Produced by: Alfonso Balcázar
- Starring: Robert Woods; Dana Ghia; Antonio Casas; Angelo Infanti; Gérard Tichy
- Cinematography: Víctor Monreal; Clemente Santoni
- Edited by: Juan Luis Oliver
- Music by: Benedetto Ghiglia; Angelo Francesco Lavagnino
- Production companies: Balcázar Producciones Cinematográficas; Compagnia Ambrosiana Cinematografica de Roma
- Distributed by: First Line Films; Morningstar Entertainment; Televista; Mill Creek Entertainment; SC Entertainment
- Release date: 5 March 1966 (Italy)
- Running time: 89 min
- Countries: Spain; Italy

4 Dollars of Revenge (Spanish: Cuatro dólares de venganza, Italian: 4 dollari di vendetta) is a 1966 Spanish-Italian action western film directed by Alfonso Balcázar and Jaime Jesús Balcázar, written by Bruno Corbucci, Aldo Grimaldi and Giovanni Grimaldi and starring Robert Woods, Dana Ghia, Antonio Casas, Angelo Infanti and Gérard Tichy.

== Synopsis ==
Bandits ambush Capt. Roy Dexter of the U.S. Cavalry while he and his men escort a fortune in Confederate gold coins. Only Dexter survives the attack. Falsely accused of orchestrating the ambush, he's subsequently sentenced to life in prison. After making his escape, Dexter pursues the real culprits to expose the truth and clear his name.

== Cast ==
- Robert Woods as Roy Dexter
- Dana Ghia as Mercedes
- Angelo Infanti as Barry Haller
- Antonio Casas as Colonel Jackson
- José Manuel Martín as Manuel de Losa
- Gérard Tichy as Clifford
- Tomás Torres as Pedro
- Giulio Maculani as Sheriff
- Antonio Molino Rojo as Dave Griffith
- Osvaldo Genazzani as Secretario de Hamilton
- Gardenia Polito
- Lucio Rosato
- Renato Baldini
- Eleonora Bianchi
- Gianluigi Crescenzi
- Miguel de la Riva as Abogado defensor
- Robert Hoot
- Ángel Lombarte as Ayudante del Sheriff
- Francisco Nieto as Propietario de la tienda
- Luis del Pueblo as Thompson
- Gustavo Re
- Juan Torres as Mexicano
- Sergio Doré as Presidente del Tribunal
- Carlos Ronda as Señor Spencer
