= Veneri al sole =

- Directed by: Marino Girolami
- Cinematography: Mario Fioretti
- Music by: Carlo Savina
- Release date: 1965
- Country: Italy
- Language: Italian

Veneri al sole is a 1965 Italian comedy film directed by Marino Girolami.

== Cast ==
- Carlo Delle Piane as Oreste (segment "Intrigo al mare")
- Gloria Paul as Jenny (segment "Intrigo al mare")
- Umberto D'Orsi as L'inseguitore (segment "Intrigo al mare")
- Ennio Girolami as Mario Giorgetti (segment "Intrigo al mare")
- Giampiero Littera as Jimmy (segment "Intrigo al mare")
- Enzo Andronico as Il commissario (segment "Intrigo al mare")
- Marco Mariani (segment "Intrigo al mare")
- Edy Biagetti as Una bagnante (segment "Intrigo al mare")
- Franco Franchi as Francesco Macrì (segment "Una domenica a Fregene")
- Ciccio Ingrassia as Francesco Pattané (segment "Una domenica a Fregene")
- Franca Polesello as L'amica di Francesco (segment "Una domenica a Fregene")
- Nietta Zocchi as La madre di Concettina (segment "Una domenica a Fregene")
- Elena Belletti as Assuntina (segment "Una domenica a Fregene")
- Ermelinda De Felice as Concettina (segment "Una domenica a Fregene") (as Linda De Felice)
- Raimondo Vianello as Raimondo Raimondi (segment "Come conquistare le donne")
