= Caprice Italian Style =

1967 anthology film

- Theatrical release poster
- Italian: Capriccio all'italiana
- Directed by: Mario Monicelli; Pier Paolo Pasolini; Mauro Bolognini; Steno; Pino Zac; Franco Rossi
- Written by: Roberto Gianviti; Pier Paolo Pasolini; Age & Scarpelli; Steno; Bernardino Zapponi; Cesare Zavattini
- Produced by: Dino De Laurentiis
- Starring: Ira von Fürstenberg; Walter Chiari; Franco Franchi; Ciccio Ingrassia; Domenico Modugno; Totò
- Release date: 13 April 1968
- Running time: 95 minutes
- Country: Italy
- Language: Italian

Caprice Italian Style (Italian: Capriccio all'italiana) is a 1968 Italian comedy anthology film directed by six different directors, including Mario Monicelli and Pier Paolo Pasolini. The film starred both Totò and the comic duo Franco and Ciccio.

== Plot ==
The film is composed of five episodes.

In the first, a German nanny behaves too rude and harsh with children, proposing to read comic social satire of Germany. The children are upset.

In the second, Toto is an old bourgeois who joins with a nice young girl. The girl follows the social models of the time, namely the "hippies" guys. Toto, however, is a man of the old school, and hates these young people who are considered by him dirty, ignorant and rude. But Toto soon comes in contact with them, and so plans a diabolical revenge against the youngsters.

In the third, a couple remains stuck in traffic in Rome. The woman, uncaring, intimates with violence her husband to look for a way out of traffic. She manages to exasperate the man who, after a crash with a car, holds the wrench and injures the driver. The woman then, hypocrite, accuses him of violence.

In the fourth Totò and Ninetto are puppets specially created to give life to the show "Othello" by Shakespeare. Ninetto plays the role of the protagonist, but he realizes that Othello is a very bad man, and still more bad is the parasite Iago, played by Totò; and so he begins to wonder why life is so bad. Toto replies that this is a mystery, because the two of them out of the scene are good, while in the history of Shakespeare's characters, they're bad.

In the next episode, the Queen of the United Kingdom goes to Africa as an ambassador, to bring a message of hope and brotherhood. However, the woman says a wrong speech, and so the African people, believing that she is doing a racist discourse, hunt alone she to the civilized world.

In the last story a woman is haunted by her husband, because she thinks he is cheating on her. Eventually, after several quarrel, the man decides to betray really her, but in the end the emotional bond with his wife recovers.

== The role of Totò ==
Totò in the film plays two episodes: The Monster of Sunday, directed by Steno and What are clouds?, directed by Pier Paolo Pasolini. In the first Totò is a man of the world who hate the fashion of the sixties, especially that of young people today who have long hair down to his shoulders and they believe everything they see over and dated. One day, the young girlfriend of Toto brings home a group of long-haired musicians who are placed in the living room and destroy all the warm and peaceful atmosphere desired by Totò, who goes on a rampage. He plans to capture one by one the young hippies in his city and shave so that they become the children model and up to date. To do this, Totò changes position all the time and even disguise, placing first in the role of a priest, then a prostitute and finally a bagpipe player at the Spanish Steps in Rome, where it is recognized by all as "maniac kidnapper hippies". Reported to the police station, Totò manages to escape only proposing the judge to shave the hair also to his son who is hateful and staring just like all the other guys in the city who follow this fashion.

In the second episode, the scene is set in a theater with no windows and exits where the puppets come to life to be infinitely the shows before the public. Domenico Modugno plays a scavenger singer who picks up the bodies of the puppets that occasionally break to throw them in the trash. This time the puppets interpret the tragedy Othello by William Shakespeare: Ninetto Davoli plays the protagonist brown, while Totò is the cruel and treacherous Iago. To complete the picture, there are also Franco Franchi and Ciccio Ingrassia in the role of captain and a guard. As the show continues, Ninetto begins to feel very sad because he is forced to play a thousand times the same roles and would like to find out what was outside the theater. In particular, he seeks the meaning of truth and Totò replied that the Truth is that which animates and makes interacting with other individuals. However, you should never say his name because otherwise it disappears. The scene continues with Othello discovers that the bride with handkerchief of another, bequeathed in his pocket cleverly by Iago, then the Moor of Venice strangles Desdemona acquiring the wrath of the public that breaks is the puppet that Ninetto Totò. The two bodies are dragged away by the garbage collector, under the gaze sad and moved by the puppets and thrown in the trash. The dump Totò and Ninetto have the chance to see the beauty that lies outside the theater: the clouds. Totò will say, "Oh, the heartbreaking, wonderful beauty of Creation!".

== Cast ==
- Totò as Anziano signore/Iago
- Ugo D'Alessio as Il commissario di PS
- Regina Seiffert as La Ragazza
- Dante Maggio
- Sandro Merli as Porter
- Renzo Marignano as L'automobilista
- Franco Franchi as Cassio
- Ciccio Ingrassia as Roderigo
- Ninetto Davoli as Othello
- Laura Betti as Desdemona
- Adriana Asti as Bianca
- Domenico Modugno as Lo spazzino
- Carlo Pisacane as Brabanzio
- Francesco Leonetti as Il Burattinaio
- Luigi Barbieri as Un burattino
- Piero Morgia as Un burattino
- Silvana Mangano as Bambinaia
- Princess Ira von Fürstenberg as Silvana
- Walter Chiari as Paolo
