= Cindy's Love Games =

1979 film by Aldo Grimaldi

- Directed by: Aldo Grimaldi
- Edited by: Daniele Alabiso
- Music by: Fabio Frizzi
- Release date: 1979
- Country: Italy
- Language: Italian

Amanti miei (literally: My Lovers, internationally released as Cindy's Love Games, Tight Fit and Barbara's Escapades) is a 1979 Italian commedia sexy all'italiana film directed by Aldo Grimaldi.

== Plot ==
Barbara, a beautiful young woman, is engaged and in love with Sergio, but she accidentally discovers his constant betrayals and decides to take revenge.

== Cast ==
- Cindy Leadbetter as Barbara
- Vassili Karis as Sergio
- Annamaria Clementi
- Maurice Poli
- Carlo De Mejo
