= Franco, Ciccio e il pirata Barbanera =

- Directed by: Mario Amendola
- Written by: Riccardo Pazzaglia; Amedeo Sollazzo; Mario Amendola; Bruno Corbucci
- Produced by: Italo Zingarelli
- Starring: Franco Franchi; Ciccio Ingrassia
- Cinematography: Tino Santoni
- Music by: Roberto Pregadio
- Release date: 1969
- Running time: 97 min
- Country: Italy
- Language: Italian

Franco, Ciccio e il pirata Barbanera (Franco, Ciccio and Blackbeard the Pirate) is a 1969 Italian comedy film directed by Mario Amendola starring the comic duo Franco and Ciccio. It is a parody of the 1883 adventure novel Treasure Island of Scottish author Robert Louis Stevenson.

== Plot ==
England, 1700: Franco is the illegitimate son of a pirate who died at sea, and now he works as a waiter in a tavern. Ciccio is an unfortunate Capitan Black who tries to bring up his image as that of a great bloody killer. The two meet in a ship, where Franco discovers a map where there are directions to a mysterious island, the location of the buried treasure of the notorious pirate Flint.

Ciccio then proposes to recruit a crew, and so doesn't realize that between the hubs and the people of the sea enters the dreaded pirate Blackbeard, who is seeking revenge, because years ago he helped Flint earning the coveted treasure...

== Cast ==
- Franco Franchi as Franco
- Ciccio Ingrassia as Capitan Black
- Fernando Sancho as Blackbeard the Pirate
- Mimmo Palmara as Flint the Pirate
- Pietro Tordi as Johnson the Pirate
- Rosita Torosh as Aluna
- Umberto D'Orsi as Creditor of Capitan Black
- Enzo Andronico as Cane Nero
- Ignazio Balsamo as pirate Manolo
