= A Monster and a Half =

- Directed by: Steno
- Written by: Sandro Continenza; Steno
- Cinematography: Tino Santoni
- Music by: Franco Mannino
- Release date: December 18, 1964
- Running time: 90 minutes
- Country: Italy
- Language: Italian

A Monster and a Half (Italian: Un mostro e mezzo) is a 1964 Italian comedy film directed by Steno starring the comic duo Franco and Ciccio.

== Cast ==
- Franco Franchi as Franco/Cesarone
- Ciccio Ingrassia as The Professor
- Alberto Bonucci as Prof. Carogni
- Margaret Lee as Christine
- Anna Maria Bottini as Barbara
- Lena von Martens as signorina Marini
- Giuseppe Pertile as Guardiano della prigione
- Consalvo Dell'Arti as Guardiano
- Renato Terra as Poliziotto
