= Silvia Solar =

French actor

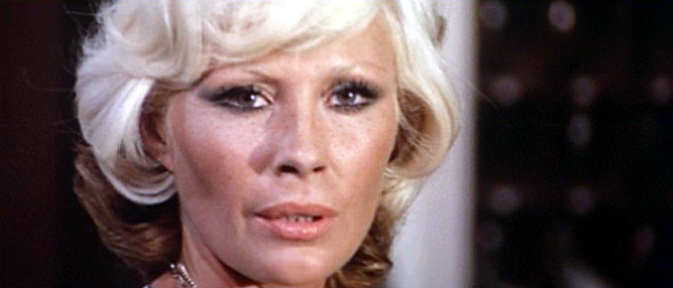
- Silvia Solar in Eyeball (1975)
- Born: Geneviève Couzain; 20 March 1936; Paris, France
- Died: 9 May 2011 (aged 75); Lloret de Mar, Spain
- Occupation: Actress
- Years active: 1957-1994
- Spouse: Rogelio Madrid

Silvia Solar (20 March 1936 – 9 May 2011) was a French actress and prolific minor star in Spanish cinema. The majority of her appearances were in the 1960s and 1970s.

== Early life ==
Solar was born Geneviève Couzain in Paris.

== Career ==
Couzain won the title of "Miss France" at age 16. Shortly thereafter producer and director Henri Diamant-Berger cast Solar in her first film role.

Her career spanned from the late 1950s through the early 1990s, starring in dozens of comedies, romances, drama, crime and spy thrillers as well as horror films. She played a main role in the Italian horror film Eyeball in 1975. That same year, she appeared alongside Paul Naschy in Night of the Howling Beast. She starred in the film Devil's Kiss, which received mixed reviews.

== Personal ==
Solar was married to actor and former bullfighter Rogelio Madrid. She died May 18, 2011, in Lloret de Mar, Spain.

== Selected filmography ==
- Les Lavandières du Portugal (1957)
- Comme un cheveu sur la soupe (1957) - (uncredited)
- C'est arrivé à 36 chandelles (1957) - Myra
- Hoppla, jetzt kommt Eddie (1958) - Gonzales 2. Schwester
- Los clarines del miedo (1958) - Fina
- El emigrante (1960) - Rosario
- Despedida de soltero (1961) - Carmen
- Madame (1961) - Margot
- Y el cuerpo sigue aguantando (1961)
- Vampiresas 1930 (1962)
- Operación Embajada (1963) - Coralito
- Tela de araña (1963) - Rosa
- The Fair of the Dove (1963) - Balbina
- El precio de un asesino (1963) - Dana
- Heroes of the West (1964) - Margaret
- Gibraltar (1964) - Miriam
- Weeping for a Bandit (1964) - Marquesa de los Cerros
- Texas Ranger (1964) - Linda Ranson
- Tomb of the Pistolero (1964) - Taffy
- Vivir un largo invierno (1964) - Teresa
- I due mafiosi (1964) - Clementine
- Relevo para un pistolero (1964) - Carmen González
- I due toreri (1964) - Margaret
- El castillo de los monstruos (1964) - Pelusa
- Man Called Gringo (1965) - Kate Rowland
- Finger on the Trigger (1965) - Violet
- Manhattan Night of Murder (1965) - Wilma de Loy
- M.M.M. 83 (1965) - Janette
- The Man from Interpol (1966) - Lydia
- Pas de panique (1966) - Germaine
- Agente Sigma 3 - Missione Goldwather (1967) - Catherine
- Danger!! Death Ray (1967) - Mrs. Carver
- La piel quemada (1967) - La turista belga
- Mexican Slayride (1967) - Francine
- Si muore solo una volta (1967) - Jane
- Mr Dinamite (1967) - Natascha
- Gentleman Killer (1967) - Vicky, Saloon Girl
- Death and Diamonds (1968) - Lana
- Sharon vestida de rojo (1969) - Carla
- Agáchate, que disparan (1969) - Espía
- La Lola, dicen que no vive sola (1970) - Nelly
- La liga no es cosa de hombres (1972) - Colette Duval
- Horror Story (1972) - Anuschka
- Crimson (1973) - Ana
- Las juergas de 'El Señorito' (1973) - Mujer de Toni
- La redada (1973) - Rosario
- Busco tonta para fin de semana (1973) - Empleada del hotel
- Aborto criminal (1973) - Clo
- Les enjambées (1974) - La doctoresse
- Serre-moi contre toi, j'ai besoin de caresses (1974) - Docteur Custer
- La muerte llama a las 10 (1974) - Jackie Polianski
- La maison des filles perdues (1974) - Sylvia
- Las correrías del Vizconde Arnau (1974) - Maria Pia
- Chicas de alquiler (1974) - Carmen
- El último proceso en París (1974) - Linda Dexter
- La Maldicion de la Bestia (1975) - Wandesa
- Eyeball (1975) - Gail Alvarado
- Relación matrimonial y otras cosas (1975)
- Guapa, rica y... especial (1976) - Doctora Rosalba
- La nueva Marilyn (1976) - Harriette
- Mauricio, mon amour (1976) - Susan
- Devil's Kiss (1976) - Claire Grandier
- Una prima en la bañera (1976) - Tía Elvira
- Las alegres chicas de 'El Molino' (1977) - Merche
- Las marginadas (1977) - María José
- La máscara (1977) - Madre de Diana
- ¿Y ahora qué, señor fiscal? (1977) - Julia
- Los violadores del amanecer (1978) - Dana's Aunt
- Trampa sexual (1978) - Madre de María
- Las que empiezan a los quince años (1978) - Madre de Susi / Susi's Mother
- La amante ingenua (1980)
- Un millón por tu historia (1980) - Berta
- Cannibal Terror (1980) - Madame Danville
- Viciosas al desnudo (1980) - María
- Barcelona sur (1981) - Madame
- Los embarazados (1982) - Tatiana
- Esas chicas tan pu... (1982) - Madame
- Los locos, locos carrozas (1984) - Clara
- The Cheerful Colsada Girls (1984)
- Últimas tardes con Teresa (1984)
- Crónica sentimental en rojo (1986) - Olvido Montal
- Más allá de la muerte (1986)
- Adela (1987) - Ángela
- Sinatra (1988) - Mujer madura
- Makinavaja, el último choriso (1992) - Radio Show Host
