= Due mafiosi contro Al Capone =

- Directed by: Giorgio Simonelli
- Produced by: Edmondo Amati
- Cinematography: Juan Ruiz Romero
- Edited by: Franco Fraticelli
- Music by: Piero Umiliani
- Release date: 1966
- Running time: 93 minutes
- Country: Italy
- Language: Italian

Due mafiosi contro Al Capone (Spanish: Dos contra Al Capone, literally "Two Mafiamen against Al Capone") is a 1966 Italian-Spanish gangster-comedy film directed by Giorgio Simonelli starring the comic duo Franco and Ciccio.

== Cast ==
- Franco Franchi as Franco
- Ciccio Ingrassia as Ciccio
- José Calvo as Al Capone
- Moira Orfei as Rosalia
- Marc Lawrence as Joe Minasi
- Luigi Pavese as Police Inspector
- Frank Braña as Bud Messina
- Angela Luce as Santuzza
- Gino Buzzanca as Calogero
- Jesús Puente as Tony
- Ignazio Leone as Bookmaker
- Solvi Stubing as Night Club Girl
- Tano Cimarosa as Gangster
- Enzo Andronico as Lawyer
- Michele Malaspina as Senator
- Franco Diogene as Night Club Announcer
