= Ma chi t'ha dato la patente? =

- Directed by: Nando Cicero
- Written by: Nando Cicero; Bruno Corbucci; Mario Amendola
- Produced by: Luigi Rovere
- Starring: Franco Franchi; Ciccio Ingrassia
- Cinematography: Aldo Giordani
- Music by: Carlo Rustichelli
- Release date: 1970
- Running time: 85 minutes
- Country: Italy
- Language: Italian

Ma chi t'ha dato la patente? (But who gave you your license?) is a 1970 Italian comedy film directed by Nando Cicero starring the comic duo Franco and Ciccio.

== Plot ==
Franco and Ciccio are the directors of a driving school. They suffer the theft of the only car they have, and their new car is prone to going completely out of his control...The film follows Franco and Ciccio, two bumbling driving instructors who somehow manage to teach people how to drive and get their license (Patente B) despite their incompetence. Their misadventures lead to a series of comedic situations, including reckless driving lessons, absurd accidents, and misunderstandings. As they try to navigate their chaotic lives, the duo unintentionally causes more trouble than they solve. The film is a classic example of Italian slapstick humor, showcasing the duo's chemistry and knack for physical comedy in a lighthearted, entertaining way.

== Cast ==
- Franco Franchi as Franco
- Ciccio Ingrassia as Ciccio
- Angela Luce as Rosa
- Eugene Walter as The American Scientist
- Aldo Bufi Landi as Rosa's Husband
- Renato Baldini as Owner of the rival driving school
- Nino Terzo as Bartolomeo
- Luca Sportelli as driving examinator Dr. Bustella
- Gino Pagnani as taft examinator driver license Dr. Filippetti
- Maria Tedeschi as Mrs. Cuccurullo's maid

== See also ==
- List of Italian films of 1970
