= Sedotti e bidonati =

- Directed by: Giorgio Bianchi
- Written by: Roberto Gianviti; Amedeo Sollazzo; Roberto Amoroso
- Produced by: Roberto Amoroso
- Starring: Franco Franchi; Ciccio Ingrassia
- Cinematography: Bitto Albertini; Erico Menczer
- Music by: Carlo Rustichelli
- Distributed by: Variety Distribution
- Release date: 1964
- Language: Italian

Sedotti e bidonati (Italian for "Seduced and cheated") is a 1964 comedy film written and directed by Giorgio Bianchi and starring the comic duo Franco and Ciccio.

== Cast ==
- Franco Franchi as Franco La Capra
- Ciccio Ingrassia as Ciccio La Capra
- Mia Genberg as Mia
- Pia Genberg as Pia
- Alberto Bonucci as Arturo
- Leopoldo Trieste as Don Marcuzzo
- Elena Nicolai as The Baroness
- Alfredo Marchetti as Sasà
- Miranda Martino as Alfonso's Widow
- Pietro De Vico as The Master Builder
- Oreste Palella as The Inspector
- Lino Banfi as Cousin Pasquale
