= Latin Lovers (1965 film) =

Latin Lovers (Gli amanti latini)
- Italian: Gli Amanti Latini
- Directed by: Mario Costa
- Written by: Bruno Corbucci; Giovanni Grimaldi
- Produced by: Thomas Sagone
- Starring: Totò; Franco Franchi; Ciccio Ingrassia
- Cinematography: Alberto Fusi
- Edited by: Gianmaria Messeri
- Music by: Carlo Savina
- Distributed by: Euro International Films
- Release date: 1965
- Running time: 95 minutes
- Country: Italy
- Language: Italian

Latin Lovers (Italian: Gli Amanti Latini) is a 1965 Italian comedy film directed by Mario Costa.

== Plot ==
The film is composed of five episodes in which is shown the love of the Italians in the 60s. Among the low quality of love stories, the episode stands out with Totò: Amore e morte (Love and death).

== Segment: Love and death ==
Antonio Gargiulo is a poor accountant who goes to the hospital to collect medical records, suspecting that he has a serious bad health. But he's fine: really bad is the grandfather of a girl who does not give peace for the bad news. Antonio is sorry and tries to console her by offering to exchange the medical records so the old man, discovering he is healthy, will die happy. She accepts, and at the same time falls in love with Antonio who, wanting to have fun with her, sends the clinic record in accounting to lend him the money from the board immediately.

== Cast ==
- Toni Ucci as Augusto (segment "La grande conquista")
- Vittorio Congia as Maurizio (segment "La grande conquista")
- Alicia Brandet as Ursula (segment "La grande conquista")
- Eva Gioia as Elisabeth (segment "La grande conquista")
- Gisella Sofio as Miss Beata (segment "Il telefono consolatore")
- Aldo Giuffrè as Arminio (segment "Il telefono consolatore")
- Lina Maryan as Carmelina (segment "Il telefono consolatore") (as Gara Granda)
- Antonietta Tefri - (segment "Il telefono consolatore")
- Nino Marchetti as Riccardo (segment "Il telefono consolatore")
- Luigi Tosi - (segment "Il telefono consolatore")
- Daniela Surina - (segment "Il telefono consolatore")
- Aldo Puglisi as Saro (segment "L'irreparabile")
- Jolanda Modio as Lucia Trapani (segment "L'irreparabile")
- Enzo Garinei as Fifì (segment "L'irreparabile")
- Carlo Sposito as L'amico di Fifì (segment "L'irreparabile") (as Carletto Sposito)
- Armando Curcio - (segment "L'irreparabile")
- Nino Musco - (segment "L'irreparabile")
- Pietro Tordi - (segment "L'irreparabile")
- Francesco Mulé as Lawyer (segment "L'irreparabile")
- Elena Nicolai as Mrs Trapani (segment "L'irreparabile")
- Totò as Antonio Gargiulo (segment "Amore e morte")
- Franco Franchi as Franco (segment "Gli amanti latini")
- Ciccio Ingrassia as Ciccio (segment "Gli amanti latini")
