= W le donne =

- Directed by: Aldo Grimaldi
- Screenplay by: Carlo Veo
- Story by: Luciano Ferri
- Starring: Little Tony
- Cinematography: Gastone Di Giovanni
- Edited by: Daniele Alabiso
- Music by: Pippo Baudo; Luciano Fineschi
- Release date: 1970
- Country: Italy
- Language: Italian

W le donne (i.e. "Hurrah for the women") is a 1970 Italian "musicarello" film directed by Aldo Grimaldi and starring Little Tony.

== Cast ==
- Little Tony as Tony Marconi
- Stefania Doria as Simonetta La Rosa
- Franco Franchi as Franco Samperi
- Ciccio Ingrassia as Ciccio La Rosa
- Pippo Franco as Victor Santaniello
- Gino Bramieri as Don Nicola
- Luciano Fineschi as Captain Luciani
- Anna Zinnemann as Donna Lulù
- Nino Terzo as The Sergeant
- Carlo Sposito as Galluppi
- Ignazio Balsamo as Maresciallo Palombi
- Paola Tedesco as Nenè
- Pippo Baudo as Colonel Bertoluzzi
- Anna Maestri as Don Nicola's Wife
- Mirella Pamphili as Mimì
- Valeria Sabel as Simonetta's Mother
- Mario Del Vago as Japan Maritime Self-Defense Force officer

== See also ==
- List of Italian films of 1970
