= Two Sergeants of General Custer =

1965 film

- Directed by: Giorgio Simonelli
- Screenplay by: Marcello Ciorciolini; Giorgio Simonelli; Amedeo Sollazzo
- Story by: Marcello Ciorciolini
- Starring: Franco Franchi; Ciccio Ingrassia; Margaret Lee; Moira Orfei
- Cinematography: Isidoro Goldberger
- Edited by: Franco Fraticelli; Teresa Alcócer
- Music by: Angelo Francesco Lavagnino
- Production companies: Fida Cinematografica di Amati Edmondo; P.C. Balcázar, Barcelona
- Release date: 1965
- Countries: Italy; Spain

Two Sergeants of General Custer (Italian: I due sergenti del generale Custer) is a 1965 Italian Spaghetti Western comedy film directed by Giorgio Simonelli starring the comic duo Franco and Ciccio. The plot tells the story of two Union soldiers of Sicilian origin, Ciccio and Franco, who are imprisoned and accused of desertion during the American Civil War. However, luck suddenly shifts to their side when the Union army requires them for a spy mission.

== Cast ==
- Franco Franchi as Franco La Pera
- Ciccio Ingrassia as Ciccio La Pera
- Margaret Lee as Beth Smith – The Lynx
- Moira Orfei as Baby O'Connor
- Fernando Sancho as Serg. Fidhouse
- Ernesto Calindri as Northern States Colonel
- Franco Giacobini as Cochise
- Nino Terzo as Schultz
- Aroldo Tieri as Specialista
- Riccardo Garrone as Specialista
- Michele Malaspina as General Lee
- Dina Loy as Mary
- Juan Luis Galiardo as Fidanzato di Mary (as Juan Luis Gallardo)
- Armando Curcio as Major Carter
- Alfio Caltabiano as Nervous Buffalo
- Ignazio Spalla as Northern Adjutant
- Enzo Andronico as Lee's Colonel

== Release ==
Two Sergeants of General Custer was released in 1965.
