= Farfallon =

- Directed by: Riccardo Pazzaglia
- Written by: Riccardo Pazzaglia
- Starring: Franco Franchi; Ciccio Ingrassia
- Cinematography: Memmo Manconi
- Edited by: Sandro Peticca
- Music by: Ubaldo Continiello
- Distributed by: Variety Distribution
- Release date: 1974
- Language: Italian

Farfallon is a 1974 Italian comedy film directed by Riccardo Pazzaglia starring the comic duo Franco and Ciccio. It is a parody of Papillon.

== Plot ==
Farfallon is a Sicilian pastry chef who finds himself in prison for attempted murder and is obsessed with the idea of escaping to carry out his crime. During a transfer by sea following a riot, he is approached by a neighboring politician, the baron of Vistacorta, in prison, in turn, for a fraudulent contract on the construction of the bridge over the Strait of Messina, who instructs him to keep him a precious cartridge case containing a considerable sum of money.

After a failed escape attempt to Naples, Farfallon is hidden by the Trappistine nuns who, in exchange, ask him to teach them the secrets of Sicilian pastry, only to betray him by handing him over to the Swiss Guards of the Vatican.

During the transfer to prison, Farfallon, taking advantage of the distraction of the guards, manages to escape once again but, taking refuge in the refrigerated body of a meat truck, he ends up right in the middle transporting meat to the prison. On reaching his destination, he is welcomed by the Baron of Vistacorta, who was also transferred there. He immediately realizes the strange atmosphere that exists in prison, with a widespread permissiveness and even the union of the male and female sections.

Nevertheless, the desire to escape to carry out his revenge against his wife Immaculata remains intact in him. So one night in a dream comes to him St. Peter who, after a negotiation on how Farfallon should later have repaid, reveals to him a secret passage from the penalty cell to a tunnel that opens onto the outside. Since it would have been unthinkable to be sent to a prison cell in such a prison, with the help of the Baron, he manages to be led to the place by the director with a ruse. The escape succeeds in half and, daringly, the Baron is also involved.

Once out, however, they are immediately caught and taken to the Criminal Agricultural Colony, where there is a prison system opposite to the previous one, with a director who immediately sets the record straight with the new arrivals. The two therefore go through a period of hard work and various humiliations, culminating in a detention of eight years in a prison cell due to a simulated attempted rape by the director's wife and sister-in-law.

Upon exiting the penalty cell, they are approached by a strange inmate named Leonardo, fascinated by the idea of reproducing the flight of birds for humans, who proposes to the two to test wings built by himself. Farfallon is the first to launch himself from the cliff and falls tumbling into the water, remaining miraculously unharmed, verifying, in fact, the failure of the invention; the Baron, consequently, prefers not to jump.

In the credits we discover that Farfallon managed to swim to Sicily where he finally killed his wife and also the Baron's lover before being arrested again and taken back to prison where he spent the rest of his life in life imprisonment with the Baron.

== Cast ==
- Franco Franchi as Farfallon
- Ciccio Ingrassia as Barone di Vistacorta
- Fiorenzo Fiorentini as Leonardo
- Gina Rovere as Madre superiora
- Micaela Pignatelli as Direttrice del carcere
- Mario Carotenuto as Direttore della colonia penale agricola
- Nino Terzo as Guardia carceraria
- Linda Sini as Figlia del colonnello
- Enzo Andronico as Detenuto
