= Un caso di coscienza =

1970 film

- In Italy the cornuto (getting horned) gesture hints at or targets a man disgraced by being cheated on
- Directed by: Giovanni Grimaldi
- Written by: Giovanni Grimaldi
- Story by: Leonardo Sciascia
- Starring: Lando Buzzanca; Françoise Prévost
- Cinematography: Aldo Greci
- Music by: Riz Ortolani
- Release date: 1970
- Country: Italy
- Language: Italian

Un caso di coscienza (Italian for A matter of conscience) is a 1970 Italian comedy-drama film written and directed by Giovanni Grimaldi. It is based on the Leonardo Sciascia's short story with the same name, which is part of the collection Il mare colore del vino.

== Plot ==
On the train to his hometown Maddà (a fictitious place in Sicily) after one of his work trips to Rome, Advocate Salvatore Vaccagnino comes across the women's magazine Lady Signora. On the page Ask Father Lucchesini there is a letter about the moral dilemma of a married woman in Maddà who has committed an act of infidelity in spite of loving her husband. Caught between the pain of guilt and the risks of confessing to her husband, she asks for Father Lucchesini's help. Due to the gravity of the situation, Father Lucchesini recommends her to stay silent till the next issue until he puts more thought into the matter.

In order to put his peers in the city council club to shame, Vaccagnino reads them the letter concluding that all the married men in the council are potential cuckolds. A married man himself, Vaccagnino clears his name though by referring to a part in which the woman has given away that, from her house, she could often see her lover going to the bank, while the only thing that can be seen from Vaccagnino's is "the sea and nothing but the sea".

Trying to mend their injured reputation, others tail the postman to discover the subscribers, but to their disappointment, the only ones are the public places of tailor shop and the beauty salon. After getting their hands on a copy of Lady Signora the men sit together to read the article, some take an oath that if the woman turns out to be among their wives, they will do whatever it takes to regain their honor.

However, the article begins with Father Lucchesini's apology for a typo that had happened in the previous issue because of which the word boat (barca) reads bank (banca), hence putting the burden on Vaccagnino's shoulders. Even though the other members of the club stand up for him by claiming that parts of the sea can be seen from their houses too, Vaccagnino's pride is broken.

Salvatore gets home to confront his wife Rita, and ends up offering her his mercy if she would confess. But no matter how hard he begs, Rita insists on her innocence. It makes Salvatore to offer her his confession in exchange for hers. Though Rita does not agree with the idea, Salvatore goes ahead anyway and confesses that he has a mistress in Rome who is pregnant by him.

But Rita tells him that it can not be his child as, contrary to what she had told her years ago when they visited a doctor, it is he who is infertile and not Rita. She confesses that she lied because she didn't want Salvatore's pride to be broken. She also tells him that she looks for nothing in return for her fidelity as it comes from nothing but the essence of her nature.

The next morning, when the club members are sitting with their wives in a café in the town square, Solfi, one of the members of the council, whispers to his wife Sandra disapprovingly that writing to a magazine about her affair was not a good idea. Knowing about the affair the whole time and doing nothing enrages Sandra. The movie ends with her attacking Solfi and shouting in hysteria that she'd rather get perished by a man crazed by the jealousy of love than live with a man who pretends to love her.

== Cast ==
- Lando Buzzanca as Salvatore Vaccagnino, a lawyer
- Françoise Prévost as Sandra
- Raymond Pellegrin as Solfi
- Turi Ferro as a Judge
- Saro Urzì as a pharmacist
- Antonella Lualdi as Rita Vaccagnino
- Nando Gazzolo as Alfredo Serpieri
- Dagmar Lassander as Annalisa
- Helga Liné as Lola
- Paolo Carlini as Don Gualtiero
- Michele Abruzzo as Baron Carmelo Favara
- Carletto Sposito as Benito Pozzi
- Aldo Puglisi as Licasio, an accountant. After the passing of the late Buzzanca in December 2022, Puglisi became the only living actor in one of the roles of the city council members.
- Franco Lantieri as Gaetano
- Marcella Michelangeli as Gaetano's wife
- Aldo Bufi Landi as Dr. Giulio
- Gisèle Pascal as Giuseppina, Dr. Giulio's wife
- Alfredo Rizzo as the Club president
- Elio Zamuto as Nunzio

== Production ==
Grimaldi's first choice for the role of Salvatore Vaccagnino was Nino Manfredi. Principal cinematography started in Catania on 14 September 1969.

== Changes from source material ==
In the original short story, there is no mention of Vaccagnino having an affair (and hence all the other related events). In addition, Father Lucchesini answers the letter in a single issue of the magazine (and the subject of the typo is introduced only in the movie).

== See also ==
- List of Italian films of 1970
