= Franca Polesello =

Italian actress (1930–2021)

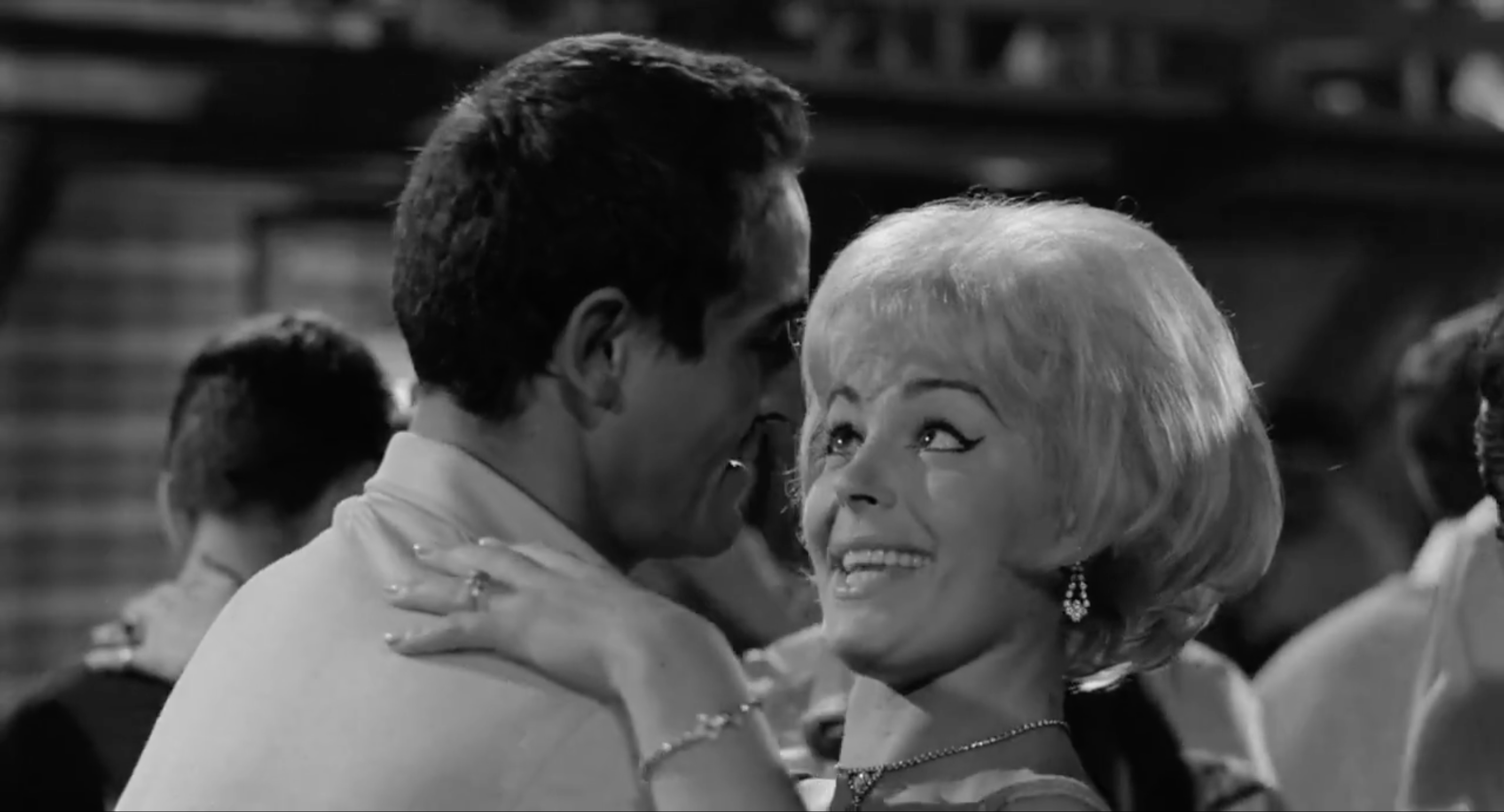
- Polesello in Il Sorpasso (1962)
- Born: 7 August 1930; Oderzo, Italy
- Died: 3 August 2021 (aged 90); Rome, Italy
- Occupation: Actress
- Years active: 1962–1972

Franca Polesello (7 August 1930 – 8 March 2021) was an Italian actress.

== Biography ==
Franca Polesello began her career in the late fifties in the show, after becoming Miss Lombardy. She worked as a television model and model, before appearing in the sixties in peplum films. She was later cast in comedy, drama and spy story films.

Among the roles that have given her greater notoriety there's Dino Risi's film Il Sorpasso.

He took part in some films of the couple formed by Franco and Ciccio, including Veneri al sole and I 2 magnifici fresconi.

Franca Polesello's career lasted a little over a decade, with about thirty film participations overall, after which the actress abandoned the artistic activity.
