= The Two Parachutists =

1965 film directed by Lucio Fulci

I due parà
- Directed by: Lucio Fulci
- Written by: Vittorio Metz; Amedeo Sollazzo; Lucio Fulci
- Produced by: Renato Jaboni
- Starring: Franco Franchi; Ciccio Ingrassia; Umberto D'Orsi; Robnerto Camardiel; Monica Randall
- Cinematography: Tino Santoni; Giovanni Bergamini
- Edited by: Pedro Del Rey
- Music by: Piero Umiliani
- Production companies: IMA Film; Agata Film
- Distributed by: Medusa
- Release date: 24 December 1965
- Running time: 90 minutes
- Country: Italy
- Language: Italian

The Two Parachutists (Italian: I due parà) is a black-and-white 1965 Italian war comedy film directed by Lucio Fulci, starring the comic duo Franco and Ciccio. The film is a French-Spanish-Italian production (title in Spanish: Los dos paracaidistas; in French: Les Deux Parachutistes).

== Plot ==
Franco and Ciccio are two Sicilian street artists who are forced to flee to the United States to escape their debts. However they board the wrong ship and find themselves arriving in an (imaginary) South American country, where they are kept as prisoners. Rescued by U.S. soldiers, they are eventually sent to fight in the Vietnam War.

== Cast ==
- Franco Franchi ... Franco Impallomeni
- Ciccio Ingrassia ... Ciccio Impallomeni
- Umberto D'Orsi ... American ambassador
- Roberto Camardiel ... Gen. Jose Limar
- Mónica Randall ... Rosita
- Luis Peña ... Alvardo Garcia
- Ignazio Leone ... Parachutist Sarge Sullivan
- Enzo Andronico ... Cafe owner
- Lino Banfi ... Tequinho (as Pasquale Zagaria)
- Luciano Bonanni ... Villager with the rifles
- Franco Morici ... Parachute lieutenant
- Emilio Rodríguez ... Diego
- Tano Cimarosa ... Garcia's aide
- Francesca Romana Coluzzi ... Passion Flower
- Piero Morgia ... Parachutist Jack
- Linda Sini ... Consuelo
- Calogero Azaretto ... Limar's private

== Production ==
Despite some photographs on the covers of later video releases being colourised, the film was filmed in 1965 in black-and-white, at a time when colour film was about to become the standard output.

This period of Fulci's work is intensively marked by his collaborations with Franco and Ciccio. In 1965, while I due pericoli pubblici was still being shown in theaters in Italy, Fulci directed two Franco and Ciccio films, The Two Parachutists and 002 Operazione Luna. In 1966 he would film Come svaligiammo la Banca d’Italia, again with the Sicilian duo.

== Reception ==
According to a retrospective review: "Coming just a month after the enjoyably loopy 002 Operazione Luna, this is a rather slapdash entry in the long-running series, a Spanish-Italian co-production casting the boys as a pair of bungling Sicilian parachutists who get involved in a coup d'etat in an unnamed banana republic. The usual slapstick and farcical situations ensue, all played out with the frantic signature hysteria which has marked most Franco and Ciccio films." Nevertheless, a retrospective review underlines the fact that Fulci's directing has more artistic quality than most Franco and Ciccio films made by other directors.

== Release ==
A DVD version was released in Italy by Mustang in December 2021.
