= I due mafiosi =

- Directed by: Giorgio Simonelli
- Written by: Bruno Corbucci; Giovanni Grimaldi
- Produced by: Edmondo Amati
- Starring: Franco Franchi; Ciccio Ingrassia
- Cinematography: Julio Ortas
- Edited by: Franco Fraticelli
- Music by: Stefano Torossi; Giorgio Fabor
- Release date: 1964
- Running time: 90 minutes
- Language: Italian

I due mafiosi (Spanish: Dos de la mafia, literally "Two Mafiamen") is a 1964 Italian-Spanish crime comedy film directed by Giorgio Simonelli and starring the comedy duo Franco and Ciccio. It is a parody of Alberto Lattuada's Mafioso.

== Cast ==
- Franco Franchi as Franco Fisichella
- Ciccio Ingrassia as Ciccio Spampinato
- Aroldo Tieri as Commissioner Dupont
- Mischa Auer as Mischa
- Gino Buzzanca as Don Calogero Sparatore
- José Riesgo as Don Fifì, aka the Moroccan
- Moira Orfei as Claudette
- Isabella Biagini as Jacqueline
- Silvia Solar as Clementine
- Mario Frera as Director
- Pino Renzi as Rosario
- Piero Gerlini as French Customs Officer
- Nino Fuscagni as Lido's Waiter
