= Aldo Grimaldi =

Italian director and screenwriter

Aldo Grimaldi (1942 – 5 August 1990) was an Italian director and screenwriter.

Born in Catania, the son of the director and screenwriter Giovanni Grimaldi, he started his career as an assistant director in the films of his father. He made his directorial debut in 1967 with the "musicarello" Nel sole, and then he became a specialist of the genre, often working with the couple formed by Al Bano and Romina Power. He also directed a number of commedie sexy all'italiana. He died of an incurable disease at 48.

== Filmography ==
=== As director ===
- Nel sole (1967)
- L'oro del mondo (1968)
- Pensando a te (1969)
- Il ragazzo che sorride (1969)
- Il signor Pietro (1970)
- W le donne (1970)
- Paths of War (1970)
- When Women Were Called Virgins (1972)
- Cindy's Love Games (1979)
- La cameriera seduce i villeggianti (1980)
- Champagne in paradiso (1984)

=== As writer ===
- 4 Dollars of Revenge (1966)
- L'oro del mondo (1968)
- Il signor Pietro (1970)
- Paths of War (1970)
- When Women Were Called Virgins (1972)
- The Inconsolable Widow Thanks All Those Who Consoled Her (1973)
- Cindy's Love Games (1979)

=== As assistant director ===
- I terribili 7 (1963)
- Toto vs. the Four (1963)
- Two Colonels (1963)
- My Love (1964)
- In ginocchio da te (1964)
- James Tont operazione U.N.O. (1965)
- Se non avessi più te (1965)
- In a Colt's Shadow (1965)
- Mi vedrai tornare (1966)
- The Handsome, the Ugly, and the Stupid (1967)
