= The Two Colonels =

- Directed by: Steno
- Written by: Bruno Corbucci; Giovanni Grimaldi
- Produced by: Gianni Buffardi
- Starring: Totò; Walter Pidgeon
- Cinematography: Gino Santoni
- Edited by: Giuliana Attenni
- Music by: Gianni Ferrio
- Distributed by: Titanus
- Release date: 1963
- Running time: 96 min
- Country: Italy
- Languages: Italian; English

The Two Colonels (Italian: I due colonnelli) is a 1963 Italian comedy film directed by Steno and starring Totò and Walter Pidgeon. The character of Totò took inspiration from a similar character he played in Totò Diabolicus.

== Plot ==
The story takes place on the Greek-Albanian border, where Italian and British troops face off in 1943. Both sides take, lose, and retake a border village countless times during the entire movie. The village is taken and retaken by both sides so many times that the locals no longer pay attention to the battles and openly collaborate with whichever side is occupying the village at the time. Both sides use the same hotel as their HQ, and a friendship and mutual respect even develop between the two opposing commanding officers. This goes on until the Germans arrive and order the Italian commander Di Maggio to destroy the village, killing its inhabitants, an order the Italian commander refuses to carry out, bringing on a death sentence. His men refuse the German officer's order to fire and are also condemned to death. The British invade the village just in time to save the Italians, and all rejoice at the news that Italy has just asked for an armistice, so they could join the Allies during the final stages of the war.

== Cast ==
- Totò: Colonel Antonio Di Maggio Regio Esercito
- Walter Pidgeon: Colonel Timothy Henderson Royal Fusiliers
- Nino Taranto: Sgt. Quaglia
- Giorgio Bixio: Soldier Giobatta Parodi
- Toni Ucci: Mazzetta
- Nino Terzo: Soldier La Padula
- Scilla Gabel: Iride
- Gérard Herter: German General von Tirpitz
- Rowland Bartrop (as Roland von Bartrop): Major Kruger
- Andrea Scotti: Iride's husband
