= Paolo il freddo =

- Directed by: Ciccio Ingrassia
- Written by: Marino Onorati; Ciccio Ingrassia
- Story by: Ciccio Ingrassia
- Starring: Franco Franchi
- Cinematography: Clemente Santoni; Aldo Giordani
- Music by: Franco Godi
- Release date: 1974
- Language: Italian

Paolo il freddo (i.e. "Paolo the cold") is a 1974 Italian comedy film written and directed by Ciccio Ingrassia and starring Franco Franchi. A parody of Marco Vicario's Paolo il caldo, it is Ingrassia's first (of two) film as a director.

== Cast ==
- Franco Franchi as Paolino Pastorino
- Ileana Rigano as Lucia
- Grazia Di Marzà as Paolino's Aunt
- Guido Leontini as The Cuckold
- Annie Carol Edel as The Treacherous Wife
- Dante Cleri as Don Miguel
- Mimmo Baldi as The Treacherous Wife's Lover
- Luca Sportelli as Federico
- Elio Crovetto as The Prior
- Isabella Biagini as The Rich Lady
- Ciccio Ingrassia as Mandracchì the Magician
- Tino Scotti as Commendator Galbusera
- Linda Sini as The Countess
- Ciro Papa as Fernando
- Moira Orfei as herself

== See also ==
- List of Italian films of 1974
