= 002 Operazione Luna =

1965 film directed by Lucio Fulci

002 operazione luna
- Directed by: Lucio Fulci
- Screenplay by: Vittorio Metz; Amedeo Sollazzo
- Starring: Franco Franchi; Ciccio Ingrassia; Monica Randall; Linda Sini; Ignazio Leone
- Cinematography: Tino Santoni
- Edited by: Pedro del Rey
- Music by: Coriolano Gori
- Production companies: IMA Productions; Agata Films S.A.
- Distributed by: Medusa; Cinesco
- Release dates: 25 November 1965 (Turin, Italy); 19 July 1967 (Bilbao, Spain)
- Running time: 90 minutes
- Countries: Italy; Spain

002 operazione Luna is a 1965 science fiction comedy film directed by Lucio Fulci. The film stars Franco and Ciccio, Mónica Randall and Linda Sini.

== Plot ==
KGB authorities abduct two criminals (Franco and Ciccio) who look precisely like missing spacemen and pretend they are the returning cosmonauts. They launch them in a rocket so that they can land in public view, leading the populace to believe it was the original spacecraft that had returned. The two criminals look so much like the astronauts that they even fool their wives. Later, however, the actual spacecraft returns to Earth undamaged, and the plan goes awry. In the end, Franco and Ciccio stay in Russia, and the real astronauts relocate to Italy.

== Cast ==
- Franco Franchi as Franco / Colonel Paradowsky
- Ciccio Ingrassia as Ciccio / Major Borovin
- Mónica Randall as Mishca Paradowsky
- Linda Sini as Leonidova
- María Silva
- Elena Sedlak (credited as Hélène Sedlak)
- Emilio Rodríguez
- Francesca Romana Coluzzi as Russian Agent
- Chiro Bermejo
- Ignazio Leone as Sergio
- Franco Morici
- Enzo Andronico as Ivan
- Piero Morgia as soviet lieutenant
- Lino Banfi as Policeman (credited as Pasquale Zangaria)

== Production ==
002 operazione luna was an Italian and Spanish co-production between Ima Film based in Rome and Agata Film based in Madrid.

Director Lucio Fulci stated that both 002 operazione luna and The Two Parachutists had more restrictions put on him than usual. Fulci explained that both films were shot in seven weeks. Despite the 002 in the title, the film is not a spy spoof and there are few scenes set in outer space. Along with Warriors of the Year 2072, this film was among the two films that had Fulci attempt a science fiction themed production.

Fulci has proclaimed that to film the scene where a space ship takes off in the film, he used four lights and a black cloth over a stage with a lot of little bulks on the floor for stars, all filmed in slow motion. Fulci referred to this special effect as "a source of pride for me!". Troy Howarth, a Fulci biographer, commented that Fulci's memory must have been faulty, since he claims that scene in the film was all done using stock footage.

== Release ==
002 operazione luna was distributed theatrically in Italy by Medusa Disribuzione. It was first released in Turin, Italy on November 25, 1965 followed by screenings in both Taranto and Foccia on December 1, 1965 and in the next year in Rome on March 19, 1966.

In Spain, it was distributed by Cinesco first being released in Bilbao on July 19, 1967 and then Barcelona on November 5, 1967 and Madrid on July 16, 1969. It was released in Spain as Dos cosmonautas a la fuera by the distributor Cinesco.
