= Giuseppe Orlandini =

Italian film director

- Born: 1922; Florence, Italy
- Occupations: Film director Screenwriter
- Years active: 1940-1967

Giuseppe Orlandini (born 1922) was an Italian film director and screenwriter. He directed ten films between 1940 and 1967.

== Filmography ==
- Continuavano a chiamarli... er più e er meno (1972)
- I clan dei due borsalini (1971)
- I due maggiolini più matti del mondo (1970)
- Gli infermieri della mutua (1969)
- I due crociati (1968)
- I due vigili (1967)
- La ragazzola (1965)
- La pupa (1963)
- Cronache del '22 (1962)
- Tutti innamorati (1959)
