= Paths of War =

- Original title: Franco e Ciccio sul sentiero di guerra
- Directed by: Aldo Grimaldi
- Written by: Bruno Corbucci; Giovanni Grimaldi
- Produced by: Sergio Bonotti
- Starring: Ciccio Ingrassia & Franco Franchi
- Cinematography: Fausto Zuccoli
- Edited by: Daniele Alabiso
- Music by: Roberto Pregadio
- Release date: 1970
- Running time: 95 min
- Country: Italy
- Language: Italian

Paths of War (Italian: Franco e Ciccio sul sentiero di guerra) is a 1970 Italian western-comedy film directed by Aldo Grimaldi starring the comic duo Franco and Ciccio.

== Plot summary ==
In 1858 in Italy, in Sicily, Franco and Ciccio defend the Bourbon army to prevent the unification of Italy built by Giuseppe Garibaldi. However, when the troops of Garibaldi defeated the Bourbons, Franco and Ciccio escape, taking refuge in a box, which is delivered in America. In the Far West, Franco and Ciccio find themselves involved in the American War of Independence against the Apache Indians. They, camouflage, disguise themselves first by warlike Americans, and then by Indian holy men, being able to save their skin.

== Cast ==
- Franco Franchi: Franco
- Ciccio Ingrassia: Ciccio
- Stelvio Rosi: Martin
- Renato Baldini: Jeff
- Adler Gray: Lucy Foster
- Joseph P. Persaud: Indian Chief
- Alfredo Rizzo: Sgt. Douglas
- Lino Banfi: Mormon
- Luigi Bonos: Bartender

== See also ==
- List of films about the American Revolution
