= Mario Maranzana =

Italian actor and voice actor

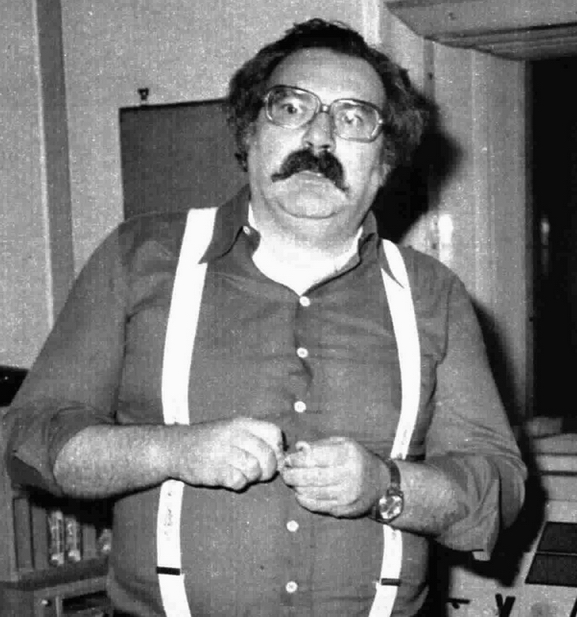
- Born: 14 July 1940; Trieste, Italy
- Died: 11 January 2012 (aged 81); Rome, Italy
- Other names: Super Mario
- Occupation: Actor
- Known for: Voice of Foghorn Leghorn and Tigger

Mario Maranzana (14 July 1940 – 11 January 2012) was an Italian actor and voice actor.

== Background ==
Born in Trieste, Maranzana began his career in the theater with Vittorio Gassman in Oedipus Rex by Sophocles, then worked with, among others, Giorgio Strehler and Luchino Visconti. He also worked as character actor in a number of films and TV-series. He was the voice actor for Tigger in Winnie the Pooh and Tigger Too.

In January 2006 Maranzana was honored with the title of "Cavaliere" (Knight) of the Order of Merit of the Italian Republic, the highest ranking civilian honour of the Italian Republic.
