= Giovanni Grimaldi =

Italian screenwriter, journalist and film director

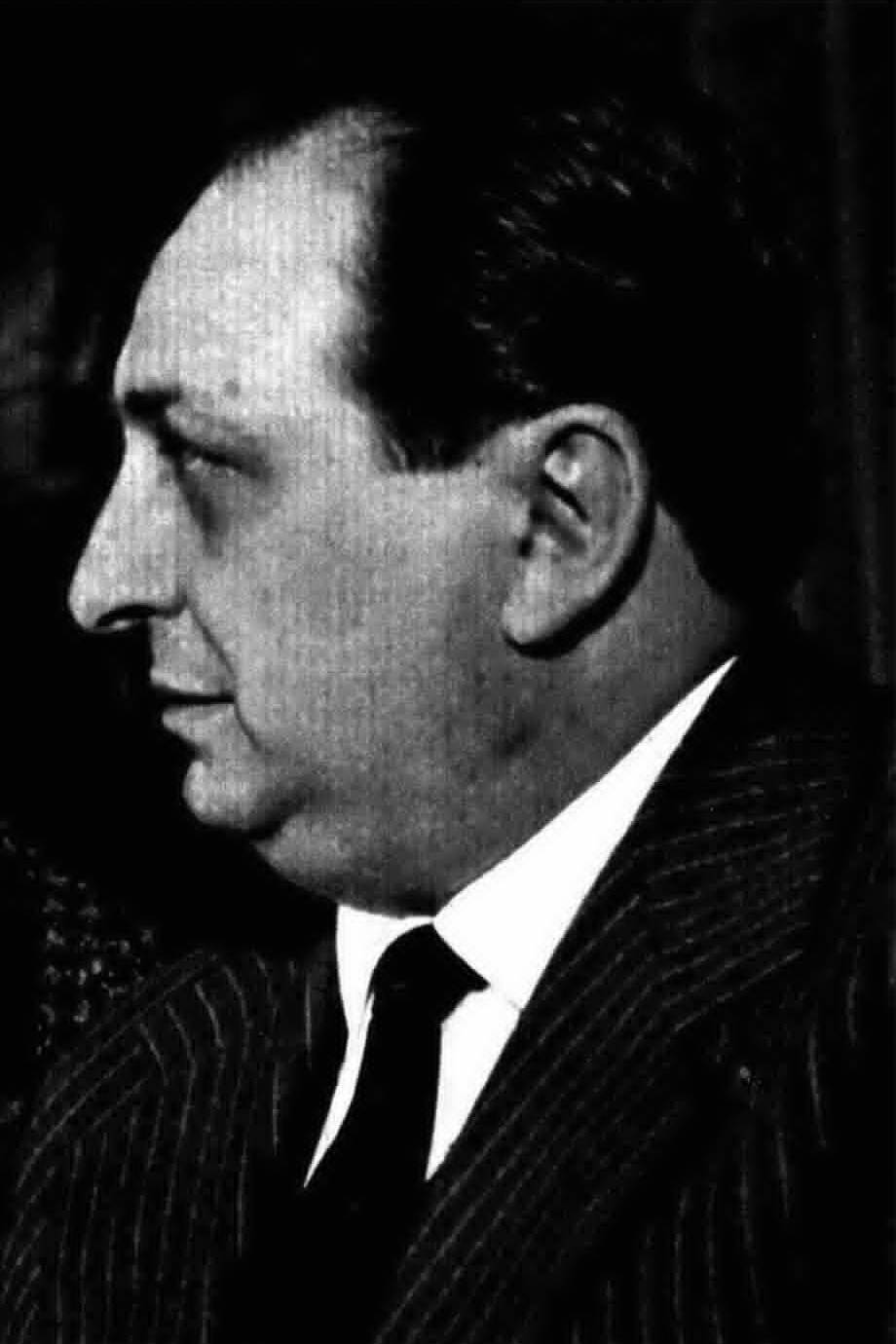
- Grimaldi in 1960
- Born: 14 November 1917; Catania, Sicily, Kingdom of Italy
- Died: 25 February 2001 (aged 84); Rome, Lazio, Italy
- Years active: 1952–1983

Giovanni Grimaldi (14 November 1917 – 25 February 2001) was an Italian screenwriter, journalist and film director. He was sometimes credited as Gianni Grimaldi.

== Biography ==
Born in Catania, Sicily, Grimaldi entered the cinema industry in 1952 as a screenwriter of a large number of often highly successful films, frequently working together with Bruno Corbucci. Since 1964 he became a prolific director of comedy films, often working with Lando Buzzanca and with the couple Franco and Ciccio.

Aside from films, Grimaldi was a journalist, a collaborator and even the director of several Italian humor magazines such as Trilussa, Candido and Marc'Aurelio. He was also a radio author, a playwright and a television director. He was the father of the director and screenwriter Aldo Grimaldi.

== Selected filmography ==
=== Director and screenwriter ===
- Questo pazzo, pazzo mondo della canzone (1965)
- In a Colt's Shadow (1965)
- James Tont operazione U.N.O. (1965)
- Johnny Colt (1966)
- The Handsome, the Ugly, and the Stupid (1967)
- I 2 deputati (1968)
- Don Chisciotte and Sancio Panza (1968)
- Un caso di coscienza (1970)
- The Beasts (1971)
- Il magnate (1973)
- La governante (1974)
- Il fidanzamento (1975)

=== Screenwriter ===
- I, Hamlet (1952)
- Matrimonial Agency (1953)
- It Happened at the Police Station (1954)
- Buonanotte... avvocato! (1955)
- Allow Me, Daddy! (1956)
- Who Hesitates is Lost (1960)
- The Two Marshals (1961)
- Totò, Peppino e... la dolce vita (1961)
- Colpo gobbo all'italiana (1962)
- Gladiators 7 (1962)
- The Slave (1962)
- Lo smemorato di Collegno (1962)
- The Two Colonels (1962)
- Toto's First Night (1962)
- Toto vs. Maciste (1962)
- The Monk of Monza (1963)
- Toto vs. the Four (1963)
- Totò Diabolicus (1963)
- Toto and Cleopatra (1963)
- Sexy Toto (1963)
- I due mafiosi (1964)
- Tears on Your Face (1964)
- What Ever Happened to Baby Toto? (1964)
- Toto of Arabia (1965)
- Latin Lovers (1965)
- Mi vedrai tornare (1966)
- 4 Dollars of Revenge (1966)
- Nel sole (1967)
- Angeli senza paradiso (1970)
- Paths of War (1970)
- When Women Were Called Virgins (1972)
- The Inconsolable Widow Thanks All Those Who Consoled Her (1973)
