= Garinei =

Garinei is a surname. Notable people with the surname include:

- Enzo Garinei (1926–2022), Italian actor
- Giuseppe Garinei (1846–?), Italian painter
- Pietro Garinei (1919–2006), Italian playwright, actor, and songwriter
