= Ughetto Bertucci =

Italian actor (1907–1966)

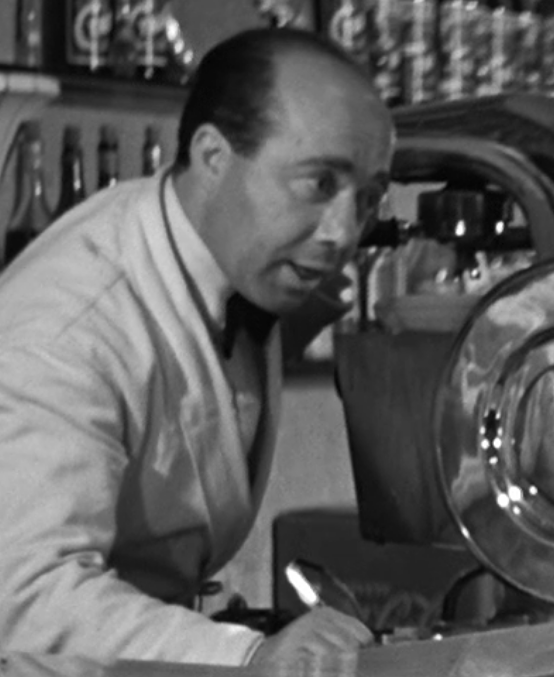
- Bertucci in Auguri e figli maschi! (1951)
- Born: 18 October 1907; Rome, Italy
- Died: 25 June 1966 (aged 58); Rome, Italy
- Occupation: Actor
- Years active: 1945–1960

Ughetto Bertucci (18 October 1907 – 25 June 1966) was an Italian film and stage actor. He appeared in more than 40 films between 1945 and 1960.

== Life and career ==
He was born and died in Rome, Italy. A fruit vendor in a Roman market square, he was noticed by the director Mario Mattoli who cast him as a fruit vendor in his comedy-drama Life Begins Anew. Following the commercial success of the film, without abandoning his market stall, Bertucci started a prodigious career as a character actor, usually cast in humorous roles. He also made occasionally appearances in avanspettacolo.

== Partial filmography ==
- Life Begins Anew (1945) – Righetto
- Before Him All Rome Trembled (1946) – Mechanic Remo (uncredited)
- Last Love (1947)
- Angelina (1947) – Benedetto Zampaglione
- The Two Orphans (1947) – Il generale (uncredited)
- Fear and Sand (1948) – Chauffeur
- Toto Tours Italy (1948) – Armando
- The Firemen of Viggiù (1949) – Un pompiere
- Adam and Eve (1949) – Buck
- Little Lady (1949) – Un ladro
- The Merry Widower (1950) – Il primo portiere del tabarin
- The Hawk of the Nile (1950) – (uncredited)
- The Elusive Twelve (1950) – Il cameriere
- The Lion of Amalfi (1950) – Luciano
- Totò Tarzan (1950) – Capo stazione romano
- Toto the Sheik (1950) – Ludovico, l'autista
- Arrivano i nostri (1951) – Cameriere di 'Chez Moi'
- Milano miliardaria (1951) – Ughetto, un parruchiere
- Accidents to the Taxes!! (1951) – Segretario indiano
- Toto the Third Man (1951) – Lamberto – il primo cacciatore
- Revenge of Black Eagle (1951) – Kurin
- Una bruna indiavolata! (1951) – Camionista
- The Steamship Owner (1951) – L'autista di Peonio
- Era lui... sì! sì! (1951) – Un fattorino
- Tizio, Caio, Sempronio (1951) – Un partigiano di Pompeo
- Auguri e figli maschi! (1951) – Barman (uncredited)
- Seven Hours of Trouble (1951) – Annibale
- Sardinian Vendetta (1952) – Terzo fratello Leoni
- Five Paupers in an Automobile (1952) – Il parcheggiatore
- Noi cannibali (1953)
- Two Nights with Cleopatra (1954) – Un mercante
- Days of Love (1954)
- An American in Rome (1954) – Autista del camioncino (uncredited)
- Toto Seeks Peace (1954) – Testimone
- L'ultimo amante (1955) – Un testimone al commissariato
- La catena dell'odio (1955)
- Eighteen Year Olds (1955) – Il giradiniere
- Storia di una minorenne (1956)
- I giorni più belli (1956) – Il gelataio
- Poor, But Handsome (1957) – The Greengrocer in Piazza Navona (uncredited)
- Il diavolo nero (1957)
- Pretty But Poor (1957) – 'Pulce'
- Peppino, le modelle e chella là (1957)
- Il cocco di mamma (1958) – The Bus Conductor
- Gentlemen Are Born (1960)
- Appuntamento a Ischia (1960) – The Taxi Driver in Rome (uncredited)
- Sua Eccellenza si fermò a mangiare (1961) – The Short Fascist with Fez
