= Gorni Kramer =

Italian composer

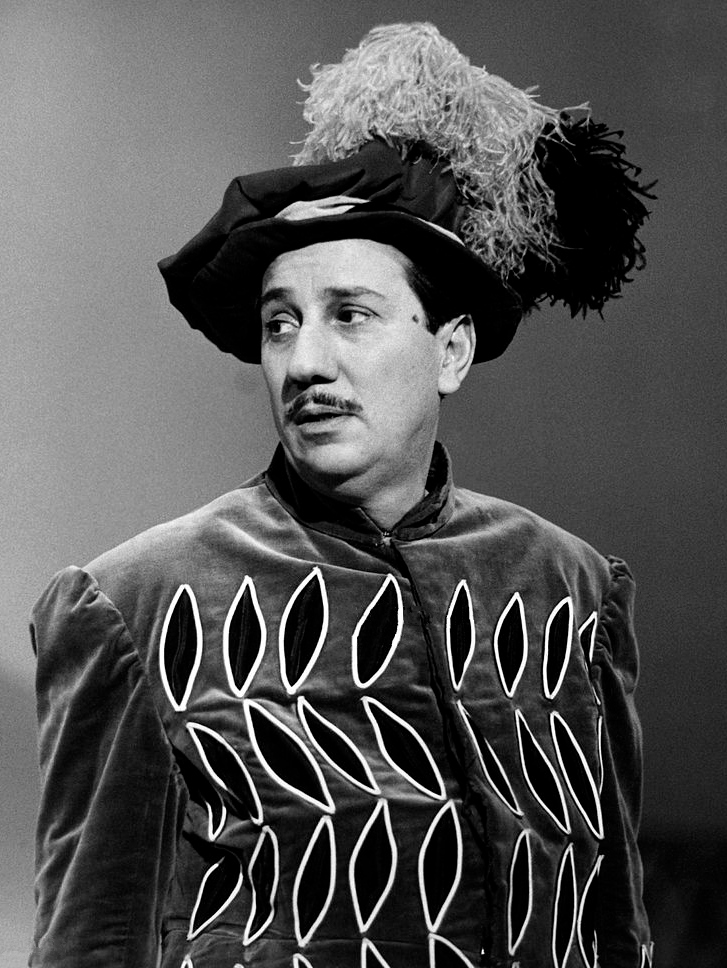
Kramer hosting the TV show Alta Fedeltà in January 1962

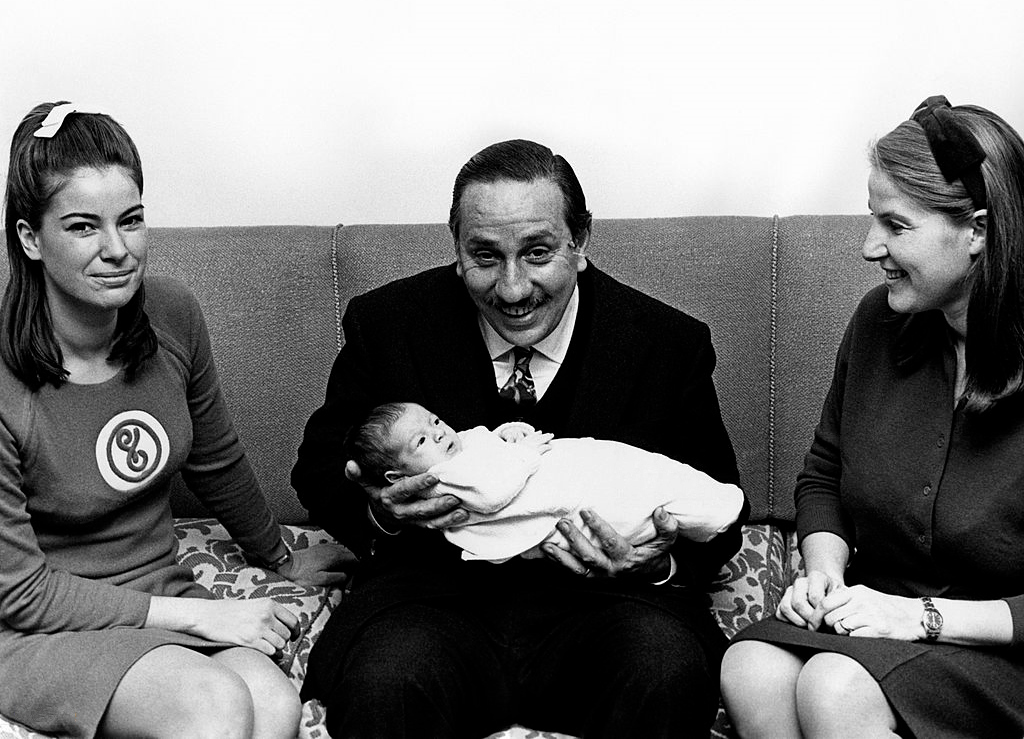
Kramer with daughters Teresa and Laura and granddaughter Paola in Milan, December 1967

Francesco Kramer Gorni (22 July 1913 – 26 October 1995), known as Gorni Kramer, was an Italian songwriter, musician and band leader.

== Biography ==
He was born Francesco Kramer Gorni in Rivarolo Mantovano, Lombardy. Despite the exotic sound of Gorni Kramer in the Italian language, which led part of his audience to believe he was a foreigner or had adopted a fancy pseudonym, it was his real name. His family name was Gorni, and Kramer his middle name, after the American cyclist Frank Kramer, who won the road race at the 1912 World Championships and made a strong impression on Gorni's father.

Kramer learned music at a very young age, thanks to his father, a musician. The first instrument he learned how to play was the accordion, with which he performed as a child in his father's band.

He then studied double bass at the Parma Conservatory and obtained his diploma in 1930. He started working as a musician for dance bands, then in 1933, aged 20, he formed his own jazz group. This new American musical genre was forbidden by the Italian fascist regime, but Gorni Kramer could get to know it thanks to some fellow musicians who worked on board the liners connecting Europe and North America.

In the middle of the 1930s he became a successful songwriter. He composed the music for "Crapa pelada" – lyrics by Tata Giacobetti – a 1936 hit performed by Alberto Rabagliati. In 1939 he wrote "Pippo non lo sa", one of Trio Lescano's most famous songs. In spite of his songs' popularity, Gorni Kramer and his orchestra were still ignored by the Italian state radio EIAR, who boycotted them because they played jazz.

During World War II he worked with Natalino Otto, a singer also banned by EIAR because of swing. Kramer wrote "Ho un sassolino nella scarpa", one of Otto's greatest hits. In the period he also began a long-lasting cooperation with Quartetto Cetra – for them he wrote memorable songs such as "Nella vecchia fattoria" (the Italian remake of "Old MacDonald Had a Farm"), "In un palco della Scala", "Donna", "Concertino".

In 1949 Gorni Kramer started working for Garinei and Giovannini, a very famous duo of impresarios who authored and produced musical comedies. Writing music for their shows was his main activity for the following ten years. Their most successful productions were Gran Baldoria, Attanasio cavallo vanesio, Alvaro piuttosto corsaro, Tobia candida spia, Un paio d'ali. They featured very popular songs such as "Un bacio a mezzanotte", "Non so dir ti voglio bene", "Le gocce cadono", "Chérie", "Simpatica".

Gorni Kramer debuted on television in 1957 with Il Musichiere music show hosted by Mario Riva. He composed the show's theme song "Domenica è sempre domenica". Other shows ensued: Buone vacanze, Giardino d'inverno, L'amico del giaguaro, Leggerissimo.

In mid-1960s Gorni Kramer gradually reduced his public performances, but he continued to work as a music publisher and a TV author. He died of a heart attack, in Milan in 1995 at age 82. He was survived by his daughters Teresa and Laura.

== See also ==
- Totò, Eva e il pennello proibito (1959)
