= Riccardo Billi =

Italian actor (1906–1982)

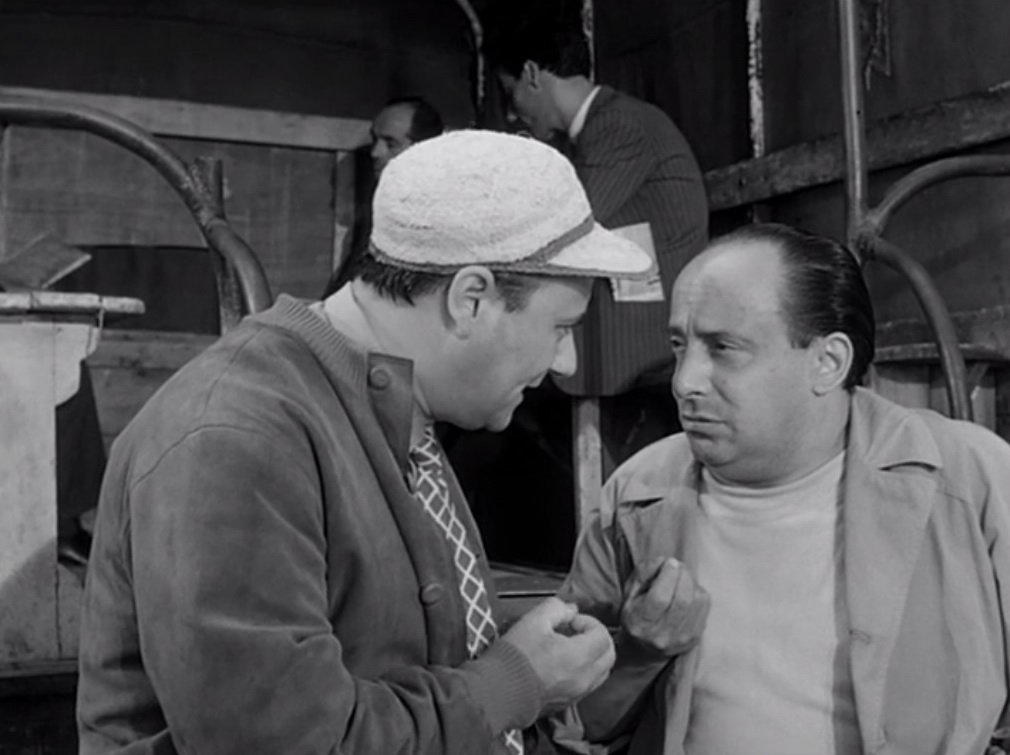
- Riccardo Billi (on the right) and Mario Riva in It Happened at the Police Station (1954)
- Born: 22 April 1906; Siena, Italy
- Died: 15 April 1982 (aged 75); Rome, Italy
- Occupation: Actor
- Years active: 1938—1982

Riccardo Billi (22 April 1906 – 15 April 1982) was an Italian film actor and comedian. With Mario Riva he appeared as Billi & Riva, one of the most popular Italian comic duos in the 1950s. He appeared in around 85 films between 1938 and his death in 1982.

== Filmography ==
Year	Title	Role	Notes
1938	L'ha fatto una signora		
1940	Fanfulla da Lodi	Rubagalline	
1940	Miseria e nobiltà	Luigino	
1943	Gian Burrasca	Il signor Capitani	
1944	The Priest's Hat	Il barbiere	
1947	Le avventure di Pinocchio		
1949	Una Voce Nel Tuo Cuore	Ciccillo	
1949	Adam and Eve	Abu Hassan, l'eunuco	
1949	Se fossi deputato	Il Regista	
1950	Ho sognato il paradiso	Raffaele	
1950	Margaret of Cortona	Menestrello	
1950	The Cadets of Gascony	Riccardo Bolletta	
1950	Totò Tarzan	Un capostazione	
1950	The Transporter	Noè	
1950	Toto the Sheik	L'arabo della cella bianca	
1950	47 morto che parla		
1951	Arrivano i nostri	Daniele Raggi	
1951	Accidents to the Taxes!!	Gaetano Pellecchia	
1951	The Steamship Owner	Himself	
1951	Anema E Core	Himself	
1951	Ha fatto tredici	Himself	
1952	Porca miseria	The Man in the Prison Cell	
1952	Vendetta... sarda	Himself	
1952	Abracadabra	Antonio	
1952	Giovinezza	Venditore ambulante	
1952	Beauties on Motor Scooters		
1953	Easy Years	Giovanni Pellecchia	
1953	Siamo tutti Milanesi		
1954	Il paese dei campanelli		
1954	It Happened at the Police Station	Riccardo, 1st tram driver	
1954	Tripoli, Beautiful Land of Love	Marshal Carocci	
1954	Laugh! Laugh! Laugh!	Controllore	
1954	Scuola elementare	Dante Trilli - Teacher	
1955	Accadde al penitenziario	Detenuto siciliano	
1955	La moglie è uguale per tutti	Domenico aka Mimì	
1955	Io piaccio	The Husband of the Harassing Woman	
1955	Rosso e nero		
1955	Motivo in maschera		
1955	Il campanile d'oro		
1956	I giorni più belli	Silvio Ceccarelli	
1956	Mi Permette, Babbo!	Romoletto - un giornalaio	
1957	Arrivano i dollari!	Michelino Pasti	
1957	Solo Dio mi fermerà		
1957	Serenate per 16 bionde	Peppe	
1957	Ho amato una diva	Produttore Piazza	
1957	Gente felice	Vincenzo	
1957	A sud niente di nuovo		
1958	Ricordati di Napoli		
1958	Mia nonna poliziotto	Belletti	
1958	Marinai, donne e guai	Gilbert, il prestigiatore	
1960	Il terrore della maschera rossa	Fanello	
1960	Un mandarino per Teo	Ignazio Fumoni	
1960	Madri pericolose	Il maresciallo Maldino	
1961	Bellezze sulla spiaggia		
1961	Le magnifiche 7	Osvaldo	
1961	Walter e i suoi cugini	Giuseppe	
1961	Pastasciutta nel deserto	Il Comico	
1962	Peccati d'estate	Il cacciatore	
1962	Lo smemorato di Collegno	Fernando Meniconi	
1962	2 samurai per 100 geishe	Samurai School Manager	
1962	Gli italiani e le donne	The Director	(segment "L'Abito non fa il Monaco")
1962	Twist, lolite e vitelloni	Barbiere	
1962	L'assassino si chiama Pompeo		
1962	Il mio amico Benito	Renzi	
1962	Canzoni a tempo di twist		
1963	Avventura al motel	Riccardo	
1963	Le motorizzate	Righetto	(segment "Un Investimento Sicuro")
1963	Gli onorevoli	Giulio	
1963	The Pink Panther	Aristotle Sarajos	
1964	I marziani hanno 12 mani	Il tifoso di calcio	
1965	La vedovella	Raffaele	
1966	7 monaci d'oro	Orazio, maggirdomo	
1967	The Climax	Filiberto Malagugini	
1968	The Girl Who Couldn't Say No	Salesman	
1972	La cosa buffa	Ilario Borghetto - Maria's Father	
1972	The Adventures of Pinocchio	Omino di burro	
1977	Per amore di Poppea		
1978	First Love	Augustarello	
1979	Belli e brutti ridono tutti	Capocchia	
1981	Uno contro l'altro, praticamente amici	Grandfather Domenico 'Er Chiavica'	
1981	Desirable Teacher	Pierino's Grandfather	(disambiguation of Pierina and Riccardo Billi)
1981	Chaste and Pure	Father of Carletto	
1981	Il Marchese del Grillo	Aronne Piperno	
1982	Desirable Teacher 2	Pierino's Grandfather	( Sequel)
1982	W la foca	Grandfather	(final film role)
