= Walter Chiari =

Italian actor (1924–1991)

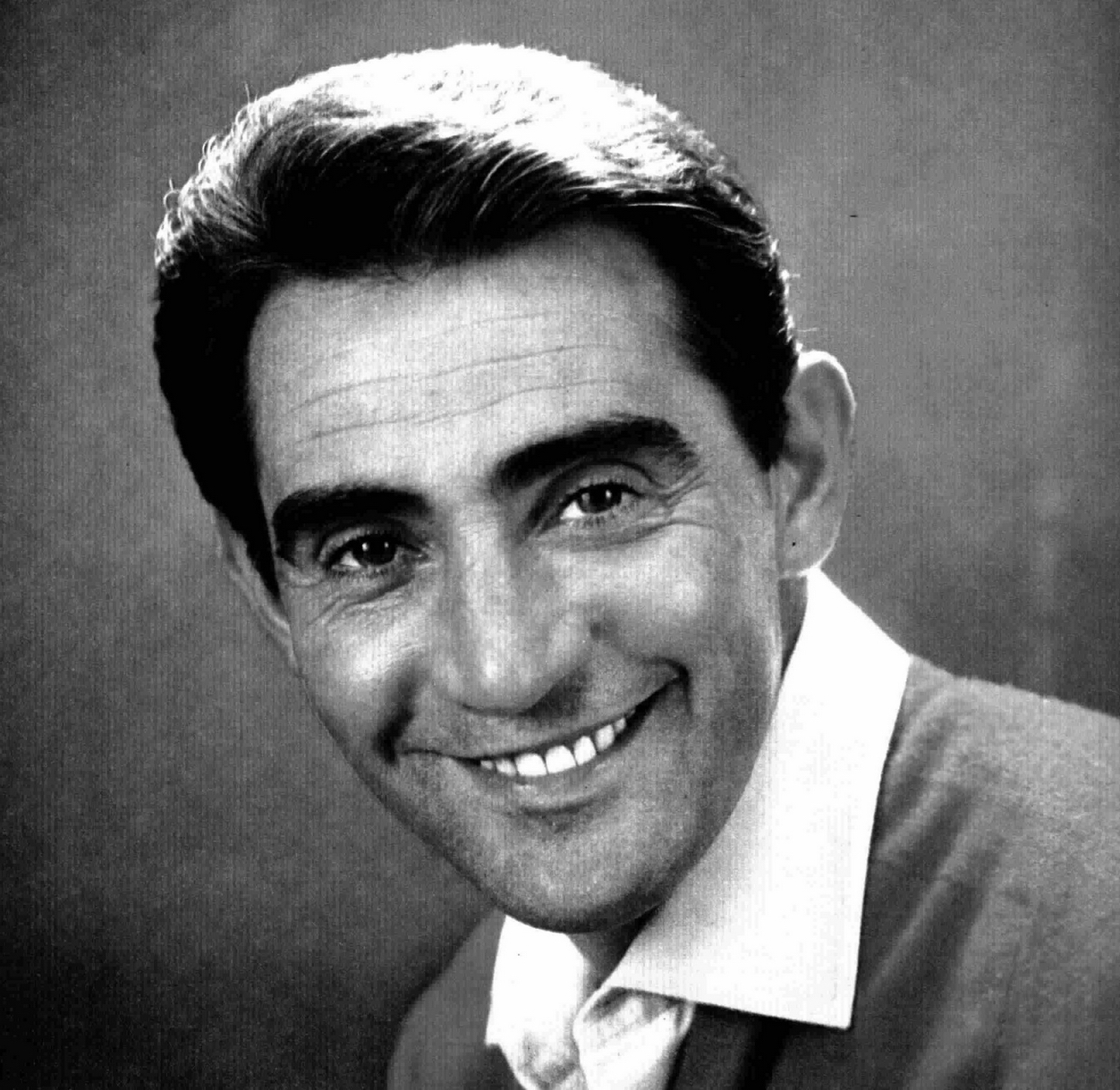
- Chiari in 1964
- Born: Walter Annicchiarico; 8 March 1924; Verona, Kingdom of Italy
- Died: 20 December 1991 (aged 67); Milan, Italy
- Occupation: Actor
- Years active: 1946–1991

Walter Annicchiarico (8 March 1924 – 20 December 1991), known as Walter Chiari [ˈvalter ˈkjaːri], was an Italian stage and screen actor, mostly in comedy roles.

== Biography ==
Walter Annicchiarico was born in Verona, Italy on 8 March 1924 to a family originally from Apulia. During World War II, he joined the Decima Flottiglia MAS and was then drafted into the Wehrmacht (a detail that emerged only after his death). He was sent to a German anti-aircraft squad engaged in Northern France in Normandy where he was slightly wounded in the fighting during D-Day. Captured, he was taken to the American prisoner camp of Coltano.

In 1951, Luchino Visconti offered him the role of the young lover, in Bellissima; he continued in the theater, in the musical comedy with Delia Scala in 1956 with Buonanotte Bettina and in 1958 with Il gufo e la gattina, and in 1960 with Sandra Mondaini, Ave Ninchi and Alberto Bonucci with Un mandarino per Teo, all by Garinei and Giovannini, but also in the prose theater, acting in 1961 in The Gay Life, in 1965 with Gianrico Tedeschi in the comedy Luv by Murray Schisgal and, in 1966, with Renato Rascel in La strana coppia by Neil Simon.

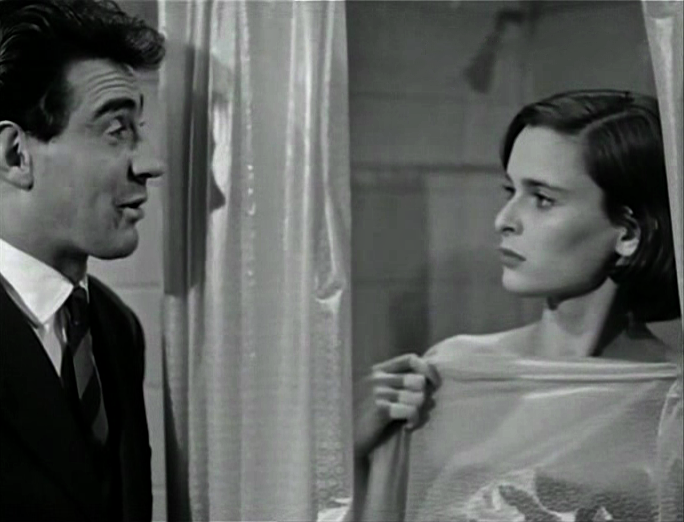
Chiari and Lucia Bosè in Era lei che lo voleva (1952)

During the making of The Little Hut, he met Ava Gardner (still married to Frank Sinatra but already estranged from him), and he started a relationship with the American superstar.

Chiari appeared in films such as The Little Hut (1957), Bonjour Tristesse (1958), Chimes at Midnight (1966) and The Valachi Papers (1972). He appeared opposite Anna Magnani in Luchino Visconti's film Bellissima (1951).

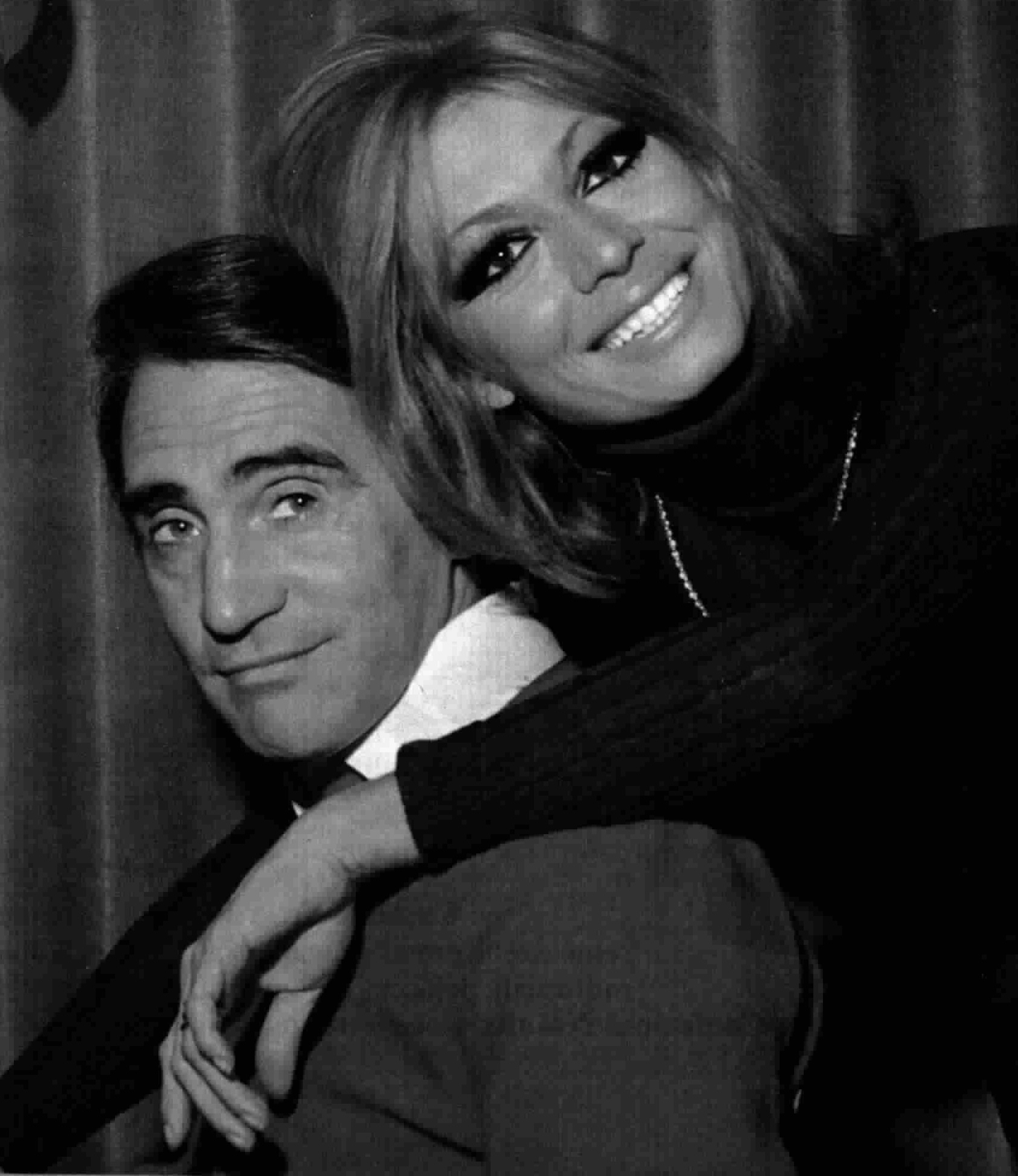
Chiari and wife Alida Chelli (1969)

He starred in They're a Weird Mob (1966), the last of the Powell and Pressburger films, based on a popular Australian novel by John O'Grady. His then girlfriend, Italian singer and actress Alida Chelli, also appeared in the film; the two married in 1969, and had one son, television presenter Simone Annicchiarico, before their 1972 divorce. He also appeared in the Australian film Squeeze a Flower in 1970.

In 1970, he was arrested and jailed in Rome on suspicion of cocaine possession and trafficking. After his release and partial acquittal (he was deemed not guilty of the trafficking count and received a lenient sentence for the charge of drug possession for personal use), his career never recovered. The Italian state television was off-limits for him, and all he could aspire to were bit parts in low-key comedies and local television appearances, and on theatre.

Chiari died of a sudden heart attack in Milan, at home, on 21 December 1991. His gravestone bears the line he once mentioned to director Dino Risi as his favourite choice for an epitaph: "Don't worry, I'm merely catching up with sleep". His grave is in the Civico Mausoleo Palanti in the Cimitero Monumentale di Milano.

== Filmography ==
- Vanity (directed by Giorgio Pàstina) (1947)
- Toto Tours Italy (directed by Mario Mattòli) (1948) as Bruno
- Che tempi! (directed by Giorgio Bianchi) (1948) as Eugenio Devoto
- The Elusive Twelve (directed by Mario Mattoli) (1950) as Carletto Esposito / Brandoletti
- The Cadets of Gascony (directed by Mario Mattòli) (1950) as Walter Mantoni
- That Ghost of My Husband (directed by Camillo Mastrocinque) (1950) as Gianni Alberti
- Abbiamo vinto! (directed by Robert Stemmle) (1951) as Giorgio Silvestri
- Arrivano i nostri (directed by Mario Mattòli) (1951) as Walter Introcci, l'autista
- It's Love That's Ruining Me (directed by Mario Soldati) (1951) as Walter Palaccioni
- O.K. Nerone (directed by Mario Soldati) (1951) as Fiorello Capone
- The Steamship Owner (directed by Mario Mattòli) (1951) as himself
- Era lui... sì! sì! (directed by Metz and Marchesi) (1951) as Walter Milani
- Bellissima (directed by Luchino Visconti) (1951) as Alberto Annovazzi
- Sardinian Vendetta (directed by Mario Mattòli) (1952) as Gualtiero Porchiddu
- The Dream of Zorro (directed by Mario Soldati) (1952) as Don Raimundo Esteban
- Five Paupers in an Automobile (directed by Mario Mattòli) (1952) as Paolo
- L'ora della verità (directed by Jean Delannoy) (1952) as Un client du cabaret
- We Two Alone (directed by Marino Girolami) (1952) as Walter
- Poppy (directed by Vittorio Metz and Marcello Marchesi) (1952) as Gualtiero / Walter
- Viva il cinema! (directed by Giorgio Baldaccini and Enzo Trapani) (1952)
- It Was She Who Wanted It! (directed by Marino Girolami and Giorgio Simonelli) (1953) as Walter Martini
- Cinema d'altri tempi (directed by Steno) (1953) as Marcello Serventi
- Viva la rivista! (directed by Enzo Trapani) (1953)
- Siamo tutti Milanesi (directed by Mario Landi) (1953)
- What Scoundrels Men Are! (directed by Glauco Pellegrini) (1953) as Bruno
- A Day in Court (directed by Steno) (1954) as Don Michele
- Of Life and Love (directed by Aldo Fabrizi) (1954) as Il commissario (segment "Marsina stretta")
- Gran varietà (directed by Domenico Paolella) (1954)
- Avanzi di galera (directed by Vittorio Cottafavi) (1954) as Giuseppe Rasi
- It Happened at the Police Station (directed by Giorgio Simonelli) (1954) as Luigi Giovetti
- Vacanze d'amore (directed by Jean-Paul Le Chanois) (1955) as Momo
- Nanà (directed by Christian-Jaque) (1955) as Fontan
- Je suis un sentimental (directed by John Berry) (1955) as Dédé la Couleuvre
- Accadde al penitenziario (directed by Giorgio Bianchi) (1955) as Walter Polacchi
- Io piaccio (directed by Giorgio Bianchi) (1955) as Professor Roberto Maldi
- Red and Black (directed by Domenico Paolella) (1955)
- Mio zio Giacinto (directed by Ladislao Vajda) (1956) as Caballero elegante
- Donatella (directed by Mario Monicelli) (1956) as Guido
- Wives and Obscurities (directed by Leonardo De Mitri) (1956) as Frank Cattabriga, suo figlio
- The Little Hut (directed by Mark Robson) (1957) as Mario
- Bonjour tristesse, directed by Otto Preminger (1958) as Pablo
- Festa di maggio (directed by Luis Saslavsky) (1958) as Gilbert
- Amore a priva vista (directed by Franco Rossi) (1958) as Luigi
- I zitelloni (directed by Giorgio Bianchi) (1958) as Marcello
- La ragazza di piazza San Pietro (directed by Piero Costa) (1958) as Roberto Gradi
- The Friend of the Jaguar (directed by Giuseppe Bennati) (1959) as Augusto
- Parque de Madrid (directed by Enrique Cahen Salaberry) (1959) as Alberto
- Lui, lei and il nonno (directed by Anton Giulio Majano) (1959) as Eugenio
- Le sorprese dell'amore (directed by Luigi Comencini) (1960) as Ferdinando Aloisi
- I baccanali di Tiberio (directed by Giorgio Simonelli) (1960) as Cassio, the Cicerone
- Vacanze in Argentina (directed by Guido Leoni) (1960) as Il barista
- Un mandarino per Teo (directed by Mario Mattòli) (1960) as Teo Tosci
- Femmine di lusso (directed by Giorgio Bianchi) (1960) as Walter
- Un dollaro di fifa (directed by Giorgio Simonelli) (1960) as Mike
- Ferragosto in bikini (directed by Marino Girolami) (1960) as 'Harold' Pasquale Esposito
- Caccia al marito (directed by Marino Girolami) as Himself
- La moglie di mio marito (directed by Tony Roman) (1961) as Giulio
- Bellezze sulla spiaggia (directed by Romolo Girolami) (1961) as Walter Crocci
- Walter and i suoi cugini (directed by Marino Girolami) (1961) as Walter Colasuonno / Rosario Colasuonno / Nicola Colasuonno
- Mariti a congresso (directed by Luigi Filippo D'Amico) (1961)
- La ragazza sotto il lenzuolo (directed by Marino Girolami) (1961) as Bruno
- I magnifici tre (directed by Giorgio Simonelli) (1961) as Pablo
- Copacabana Palace (directed by Steno) (1962) as Ugo
- I motorizzati (directed by Camillo Mastrocinque) (1962) as Valentino
- Terrible Sheriff (directed by Alberto De Martino and Antonio Momplet) (1962) as Bull Bullivan
- Gli Italiani and le donne (directed by Marino Girolami) (1962) as Renato Nelli (segment "L'Abito non fa il Monaco")
- The Shortest Day (directed by Sergio Corbucci) (1963) as L'avvocato difensore
- The Attic (directed by Gianni Puccini) (1963) as Gabriele
- The Reunion (directed by Damiano Damiani) (1963) as Cesarino
- Obiettivo ragazze (directed by Mario Mattòli) (1963) as Antonio Zanelli
- Le motorizzate (directed by Marino Girolami) (1963) as Walter (segment "La Signora Ci Marcia")
- The Swindlers (directed by Lucio Fulci) (1963) as Dr. Corti (segment "Medico e fidanzata")
- Gli onorevoli (directed by Sergio Corbucci) (1963) as Salvatore Dagnino
- Follie d'estate (directed by Carlo Infascelli and Edoardo Anton) (1963) as uomo della 'Vanoni'
- La donna degli altri è sempre più bella (directed by Marino Girolami) (1963) as Walter, il bagnino (segment "Bagnino lover")
- Heroes of the West (directed by Steno) (1964) as Mike
- The Thursday (directed by Dino Risi) (1964) as Dino Versini
- Let's Talk About Women (directed by Ettore Scola) (1964) as Philanderer
- I maniaci (directed by Lucio Fulci) (1964) as The Sicilian hitchhiker (segment "L'autostop") / Car driver (segment "Il sorpasso") / Pasquale Taddei (segment "La protesta") / Client of Night-clubs (segment "Lo strip")
- I gemelli del Texas (directed by Steno) (1964) as Ezechiel / Joe
- Le tardone (directed by Marino Girolami and Javier Setó) (1964) as Bortolo Masteghin (episode "40 ma non li dimostra")
- Här kommer bärsärkarna (directed by Arne Mattsson) (1965) as Pollo
- The Sucker (directed by Gérard Oury) (1965) (uncredited)
- Thrilling (directed by Gian Luigi Polidoro) (1965) as Bertazzi (segment "Sadik")
- Falstaff (directed by Orson Welles) (1965) as Mr. Silence
- Made in Italy (directed by Nanni Loy) (1965) as Enrico (segment "1 'Usi e costumi', episode 3")
- Me, Me, Me... and the Others (directed by Alessandro Blasetti) (1966) as Sandro
- Ischia operazione amore (directed by Vittorio Sala) (1966) as Enrico Laterra - aka Trema la terra
- They're a Weird Mob (aka Sono strana gente) (directed by Michael Powell) (1966) as Nino Culotta
- Love Italian Style (directed by Steno) (1966) as Il venditore di uova / Antonio / Flavio / 007 / Il viaggiatore / Roberto Matrasso
- The Most Beautiful Couple in the World (directed by Camillo Mastrocinque) (1968) as Walter
- Caprice Italian Style (directed by Mauro Bolognini) (1968) as Paolo (segment "Gelosa, La")
- Monte Carlo or Bust! (directed by Ken Annakin) (1969) as Angelo
- Squeeze a Flower (directed by Marc Daniels) (1970) as Brother George
- The Valachi Papers (Italian title: Joe Valachi - I segreti di Cosa Nostra) (directed by Terence Young (1972), produced by Jerry Ferraro) as Gap
- Don't Hurt Me, My Love (directed by Vittorio Sindoni) (1974) as Paolo De Simone
- Zig Zag (directed by László Szabó) (1975) as Walter, le clochard
- Son tornate a fiorire le rose (directed by Vittorio Sindoni) (1975) as Paolo De Simone
- La banca di Monate (directed by Francesco Massaro) (1975) as Ragionier Adelmo Pigorini
- Per amore di Cesarina (directed by Vittorio Sindoni) (1976) as Davide Camporesi
- Passi furtivi in una notte boia (directed by Vincenzo Rigo) (1976) as Pompeo Piretti
- Come ti rapisco il pupo (directed by Lucio De Caro) (1976) as Sterzi - Jimmy's father
- La bidonata (directed by Luciano Ercoli) (1977) as Renato
- Ride bene... chi ride ultimo (directed by Walter Chiari) (1977) as Loris Martegani (segment "Prete per forza")
- Tanto va la gatta al lardo... (directed by Marco Aleandri) (1978) as Teodoro Casadei
- Ridendo and scherzando (directed by Marco Aleandri) (1978) as Giorgio
- Belli and brutti ridono tutti (directed by Domenico Paolella) (1979) as Don Enzo
- Tre sotto il lenzuolo (directed by Paolo Dominici) (1979) as Giorgio Mori (segment "No, non è per gelosia")
- Romance (directed by Massimo Mazzucco (1986) and produced by Jerry Ferraro) as Giulio
- Kafka la colonia penale (directed by Giuliano Betti) (1988)
- Traces of an Amorous Life (directed by Peter Del Monte) (1990) as Giorgio (final film role)
