= I maniaci =

- Directed by: Lucio Fulci
- Screenplay by: Franco Castellano; Giuseppe Moccia; Vittorio Vighi; Ugo Guerra; Lucio Fulci
- Story by: Franco Castellano; Giuseppe Moccia
- Produced by: Ferruccio Brusarosco
- Cinematography: Riccardo Pallottini
- Edited by: Ornella Micheli
- Music by: Ennio Morricone
- Production company: Hesperia Cinematografica
- Distributed by: Cinedistribuzione Astoria
- Release date: March 28, 1964 (Rome)
- Running time: 90 minutes
- Country: Italy
- Box office: ITL 255 million

I maniaci (lit. 'The maniacs') is a 1964 Italian film directed by Lucio Fulci. The film was part of an Italian cycle of film a episodi, which were portmanteau multi-story comedy films that were popular in Italy from the 1950s to 1960s. The film features several short stories dedicated to various "maniacs" ranging from couples cheating on their partners, people taking advantage of each other in the workplace, and other quirky individuals.

The film was Fulci's second episodic comedy following Gli imbroglioni (1963), it was announced as forthcoming in December 1963 and was shot in January 1964. l'Unità gave the film a lukewarm review saying it occasionally showed original ideas while praising cast members performances as highlights.

== Plot ==
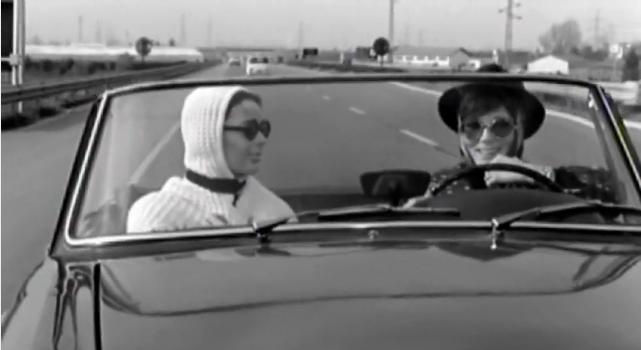
Barbara Steele and Gaia Germani in the 'L'Hobby' segment of the film.

I maniaci is a film in 13 parts. The first is L'elaborazione (lit. 'Processing') about a hearse driver who is obsessed with ensuring his vehicles give his passengers comfortable rides. Lo sport (lit. 'Sport') features a bullying office manager who loses a bet and puts his wife out on the street. When one of his employees discovers this, he uses it against the boss. The third is Il sorpasso (lit. 'Overtaking') about a motorist obsessed with other drivers speeding and refuses to let anyone overtake him. Next is L'hobby (lit. 'The hobby'), where a wife becomes anxious that her rich husband has another woman, even though she already accepts that he has another lover with a woman named Carla. La protesta (lit. 'The protest') features two friends over different historical periods, with each expressing dissatisfaction with the status quo, but never making any attempt to change anything. Il pezzo antico (lit. 'The antique item') features a couple obsessed with buying antiques near a monastery where Monks play into the couple's demands. La parolaccia (lit. 'The swear word') is about a writer having difficulty writing his first novel, and visits a successful author who suggests dredging his imagination for his most depraved fantasies. When presenting it to a literary society, the established author who suggested he do this humiliates the writer.

Lo strip (lit. 'The strip') is about a man obsessed with strippers for non-straight forward reasons. Le interviste (lit. 'Interviews') is about a career politician who finds that his vague non-answers to situations can work in all situations. L'autostop (lit. 'Hitchhiking') is about a poor Southern worker who gets a ride from a Milanese businessman. Though neither does anything wrong, they both become increasingly paranoid and hostile. La cmabiale (lit. 'The promissory note'), two middle-class couples become obsessed with appearing wealthier than each other, and become increasingly involved in debt. The last segment is La comica finale: IL weekend (lit. 'The final joke: the weekend') which features two thieves breaking into a mansion believing that the owners are away, but find it buzzing with activity, including both a husband and wife sneaking back into the home as they were both out with their other lovers.

== Cast ==
- Loris Bazzocchi as a Mechanic (L'elaborazione)
- Silla Bettini as hearse driver (L'elaborazione)
- Raimondo Vianello as Giulio Errani (Lo sport)
- Franco Fabrizi as Sita (Lo sport)
- Edy Biagetti as Biagetti (Lo sport)
- Ignazio Leone as Migliardi (Lo sport)
- Salvo Libassi as Errani (Lo sport)
- Lisa Gastoni as Mrs. Errani (Lo sport)
- Walter Chiari as the motorist (Il sorpasso)
- Barbara Steele as Barbara (L'hobby)
- Mary Arden as the party guest (L'hobby)
- Gigi Ballista as the count (L'hobby)
- Gaia Germani as Carla (L'hobby)

== Production ==
Following Gli imbroglioni (1963), I maniaci was the second of Fulci's film a episodi, a term used for portmanteau multi-story comedy films that were popular in Italy from the 1950s to 1960s. Among the returning cast from the previously mentioned film was Walter Chiari. I maniaci was announced a forthcoming film in Variety in December 1963 and was shot in January 1964.

The music in I maniaci was composed by Ennio Morricone. It was among the six films he scored that were released in 1964, including Fulci's I due evasi da Sing Sing (1964). Stephen Thrower said Fulci's score for both films was of "minor interest", with Morricone's contributions to I maniaci being limited to the title song and some comedy cues and a piece of music for the strip club scene. Thrower said that Morricone's work on the film was "not so different here from that of any other jobbing composer of the day." Morricone would only return to work on one more of Fulci's films, A Lizard in a Woman's Skin (1971).

== Release and reception ==
I maniaci was distributed theatrically in Italy by Cinedistribuzione Astoria. It was released in Rome on March 28, followed by releases in Lecce and Brindisi on April 2 and Turin on April 30, 1964. It grossed a total of 255 million Italian lire in Italy.

In l'Unità, the reviewer said that Fulci's film followed "well-trodden paths and only occasionally captures a few happy and original ideas." The reviewer said the film was sustained by only some of its performances, namely that of Enrico Maria Salerno, Vittorio Caprioli, Franca Valeri, Aroldo Tieri, Raimondo Vianello, and Walter Chiari.

== See also ==
- List of Italian films of 1964
- List of compositions by Ennio Morricone
