= Toto in Madrid =

- Directed by: Steno
- Written by: Vittorio Metz; Roberto Gianviti
- Produced by: Cormoran Films
- Starring: Totò; Louis de Funès
- Cinematography: Manuel Berenguer; Alvaro Mancori
- Edited by: Giuliana Attenni
- Music by: Gorni Kramer
- Release date: 6 February 1959 (France)
- Running time: 95 minutes
- Country: Italy
- Language: Italian

Toto in Madrid (Italian: Totò, Eva e il pennello proibito) is an Italian comedy film from 1959, directed by Steno, written by Vittorio Metz, starring Totò and Louis de Funès. The film is known under the titles: "Toto in Madrid" (English title), "Totò a Madrid", "Un coup fumant" (France), "La culpa fue de Eva" (Spain).

== Plot ==
The penniless painter Toto is commissioned by unknown Spanish fraudsters to mirror the famous masterpiece Maja Desnuda by Francisco Goya, with some details. In fact, these thieves have agreed with a rich billionaire who plans to buy the original masterpiece. When Toto discovers that all that was nothing more than a scam, it's too late...

== Cast ==
- Totò: Toto Scorcelletti
- Louis de Funès: Professor Francisco Montiel
- Abbe Lane: Eva
- Mario Carotenuto: Raoul La Spada
- Giacomo Furia: Tobia
- Luna Pilar Gomez Ferrer: Gloria Harrison
- Ricardo Valle: Pablo Segura, the torero
- Enzo Garinei: the lover
- Guido Martufi: Oriundo
- Anna-Maria Marchi: Caterina
- Anna Maestri: Mrs. Treno
- Gianni Partanna : notary
- Anna-Maria Di Giulio: Don Alonzo's wife
- Silvia de Vietri: the chambermaid
- Luigi Pavese: the policeman
- José Guardiola: José
- Francesco Mulé: Don Alonzo
