= The Steamship Owner =

1951 film

- Film poster
- Directed by: Mario Mattoli
- Written by: Ruggero Maccari; Marcello Marchesi; Vittorio Metz
- Produced by: Dino De Laurentiis; Carlo Ponti
- Starring: Walter Chiari; Delia Scala; Carlo Campanini
- Cinematography: Tonino Delli Colli
- Edited by: Giuliana Attenni
- Music by: Armando Fragna
- Distributed by: ENIC
- Release date: 23 November 1951
- Running time: 87 minutes
- Country: Italy
- Language: Italian

The Steamship Owner (Italian: Il padrone del vapore) is a 1951 Italian comedy film directed by Mario Mattoli and starring Walter Chiari, Delia Scala and Carlo Campanini. The film's sets were designed by the art director Alberto Boccianti.

== Plot ==
A rich American arrives in a little village in the mountains because he wants to advertise a drink he produces. In the village there are also two men from Rome who are at logger-heads with the locals. The coming of the American complicates matters.

== Cast ==
- Walter Chiari as Himself
- Delia Scala as Herself
- Carlo Campanini as Mr. Carlo Peonio
- Giovanna Pala as Trude
- Mario Riva as Mario
- Riccardo Billi as Riccardo
- Bice Valori as Marga
- Aldo Giuffrè as Nicola
- Carlo Giuffrè as Finanziere
- Raffaele Pisu as Pino
- Gianrico Tedeschi as Pianista
- Gisella Sofio as Coreografa
- Alberto Sorrentino as Disegnatore
- Aldo Bufi Landi as Finanziere napoletano
- Anna Maestri as Cameriera dell'albergo
- Enzo Turco as Sergente di finanza
- Ciccio Barbi as Alpino
- Guglielmo Inglese as Scenografo
- Sofia Lazzaro as Ballerinetta
- Zoe Incrocci as Donna furiosa
- Giusi Raspani Dandolo as Donna furiosa
- Loris Gizzi as Direttore Grand Hotel
- Gianni Cavalieri as Constantin
- Ughetto Bertucci as Peonio's Driver

== Bibliography ==
- Aprà, Adriano. The Fabulous Thirties: Italian cinema 1929-1944. Electa International, 1979.
- Chiti, Roberto & Poppi, Roberto. Dizionario del cinema italiano: Dal 1945 al 1959. Gremese Editore, 1991.
