= Il Musichiere =

Italian music game show (1957–1960)

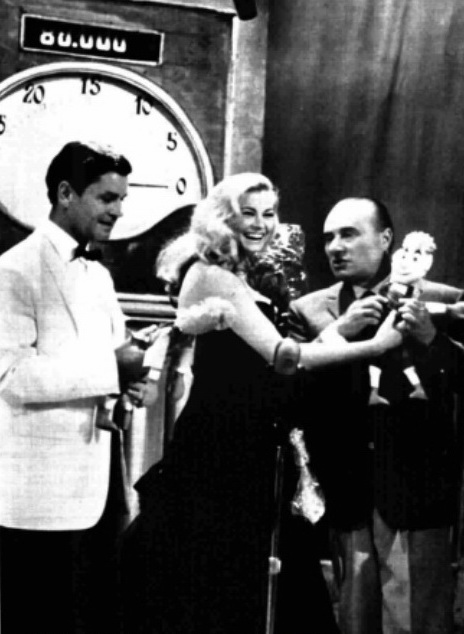
Mario Riva (right) with guests Anthony Steel and Anita Ekberg, 1958.

Il Musichiere is an Italian game show based upon the American programme Name That Tune. It ran from 1957 to 1960, and ended with the untimely death of its host Mario Riva. It ran for 90 episodes, airing on Saturday evenings during prime-time. It was directed by Antonello Falqui.

It had a one-hour format, generally with the same format as the American show of naming tunes to win money, but with a weekly guest star who was required to sing. The orchestra was led by Gorni Kramer, who sang the theme tune to the programme, "Domenica è sempre domenica" (Sunday is always Sunday). Riva's assistant on the show was Marilù Tolo, who later rose to fame in her own right. Regular singers included Nuccia Bongiovanni and Johnny Dorelli.

Famous guests included: Mina, Lorella De Luca, Totò, Marcello Mastroianni, Fausto Coppi, Dalida, Adriano Celentano and Gino Bartali. International guests included Gary Cooper (in his first televised appearance in Europe), Jayne Mansfield, Perry Como, Jacques Tati and Louis Armstrong.

A spin-off magazine "Il Musichiere" (published by Mondadori) stemmed from the programme and inlduded a then-novel free flexi-disc of music with each issue. The show also led to two "Il Festival Del Musichiere" in both 1959 and 1960 and a film based on the programme named "Domenica è sempre domenica".
