= It Happened at the Police Station =

- Directed by: Giorgio Simonelli
- Written by: Felice Zappulla; Giovanni Grimaldi; Ruggero Maccari; Ettore Scola; Vincenzo Talarico
- Produced by: Felice Zappulla
- Starring: Nino Taranto; Alberto Sordi; Walter Chiari
- Cinematography: Renato Del Frate
- Edited by: Nino Baragli
- Music by: Carlo Innocenzi
- Production company: Fortunia Film
- Distributed by: Titanus
- Release date: 6 October 1954
- Running time: 98 minutes
- Country: Italy
- Language: Italian

It Happened at the Police Station (Italian: Accadde al commissariato) is a 1954 Italian comedy film directed by Giorgio Simonelli and starring Nino Taranto, Alberto Sordi and Walter Chiari.

== Cast ==
- Nino Taranto as Police Commissioner
- Alberto Sordi as Alberto Tadini
- Walter Chiari as Luigi Giovetti
- Lucia Bosè as Stefania Rocca, wife of Luigi
- Riccardo Billi as Riccardo, 1st tram driver
- Mario Riva as 2nd tram driver
- Carlo Dapporto as Antonio Badimenti
- Lauretta Masiero as Silvana Moretti
- Mara Berni as Arnalda Bazzini
- Turi Pandolfini as Cannizzaro, the old man
- Mario Abbate as Lucio Davila, the singer
- Bruna Corrà as Street walker
- Natale Cirino as Marshal Cannavò
- Andreina Paul as The maid
- Carlo Romano as Thief's victim
- Anna Campori as The woman protesting against the strike
- Alberto Sorrentino as Comic actor
- Ignazio Balsamo as Taxi driver
- Teresa Werlen as Enrichetta Biagioli
- Pietro Carloni as Deputy Police Commissioner

== Bibliography ==
- Rémi Fournier Lanzoni. Comedy Italian style: the golden age of Italian film comedies. Continuum, 2008.
