= Giovanna Pala =

Italian actress

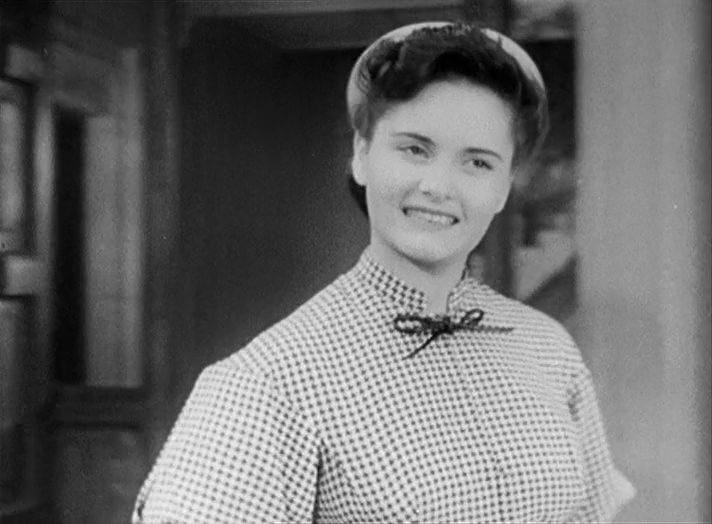
- Pala in Mamma Mia, What an Impression! (1951)
- Born: 15 July 1932 (age 93); Bologna, Italy
- Occupation: Actress
- Years active: 1951-1956

Giovanna Pala (born 15 July 1932) is an Italian actress. She appeared in ten films from 1951 to 1956.

== Filmography ==
Year	Title	Role	Notes
1951	Serenata tragica		
1951	The Steamship Owner	Trude	
1951	Auguri e figli maschi!	Luciana Sostacchini	
1951	Mamma Mia, What an Impression!	La signora Margherita	
1952	Sardinian Vendetta	Lulù	
1952	Toto and the King of Rome	Giannina	
1952	Fanciulle di lusso		
1952	Toto and the Women	Mirella Scaparra	
1952	Serenata amara	Angela	
1954	Vacation with a Gangster	Amelia	
1956	Donatella	Maria Laura Castello, Maurizio's ex-lover	(final film role)
