= Rugantino (musical) =

1962 Italian musical

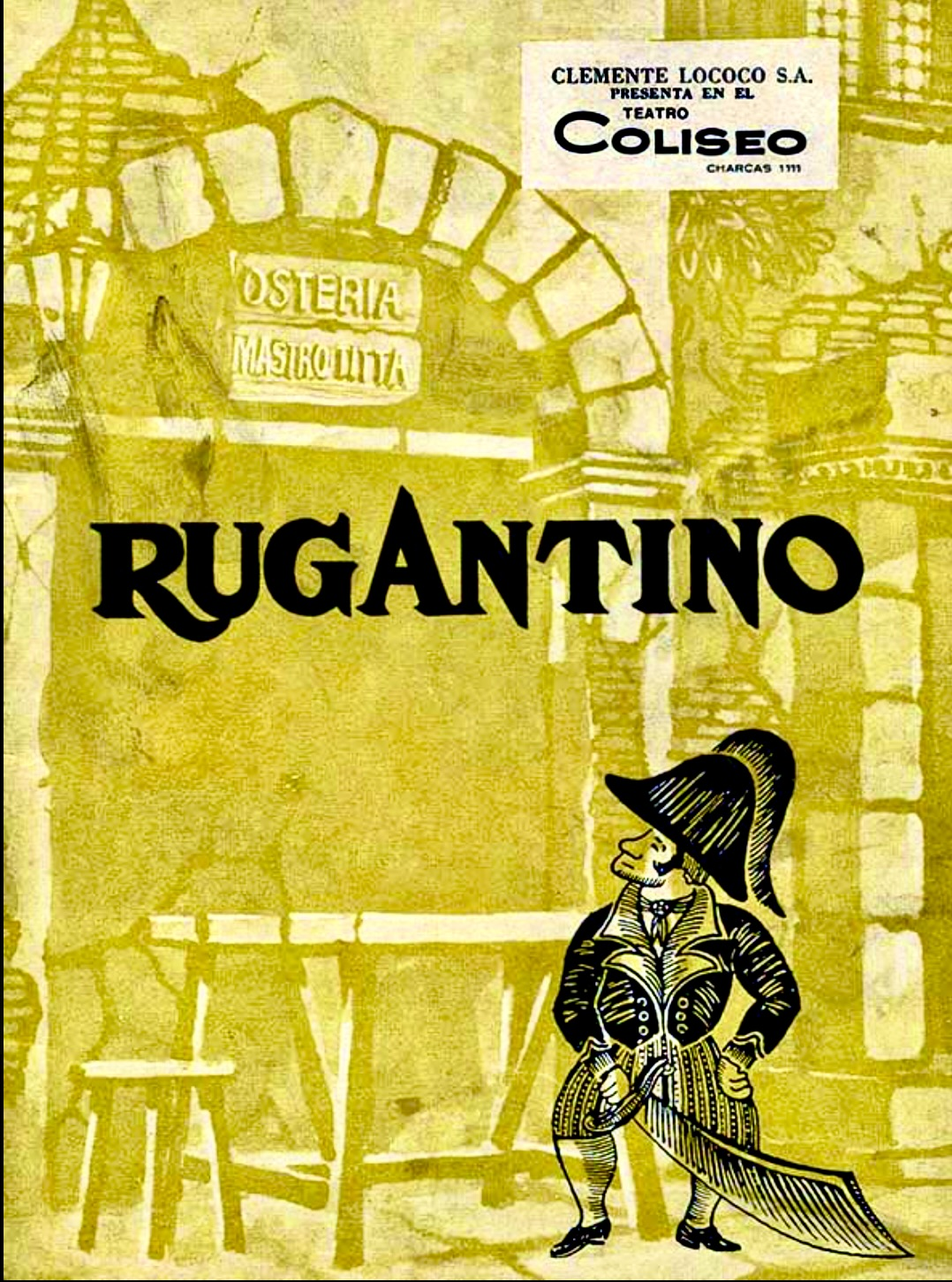
Rugantino Program. Buenos Aires, 1964.

Rugantino is a musical comedy by Pietro Garinei and Sandro Giovannini, which debuted at the Teatro Sistina in Rome, Italy, on 15 December 1962. Music was written by Armando Trovaioli.

It is a comedy set in the papal Rome of the 19th century. Actors who played in the first edition included Nino Manfredi (Rugantino, a traditional stock character from commedia dell'arte), Aldo Fabrizi (as Mastro Titta, a historical executioner), Lea Massari (Rosetta, later replaced by Ornella Vanoni) and Bice Valori (Eusebia). In the second Italian edition Rugantino was played by Enrico Montesano, and Rosetta by Alida Chelli.

The comedy was also performed in Toronto and New York City (opening at the Mark Hellinger Theatre in February 1964), in an English version translated by Alfred Drake with lyric translation by Edward Eager. The English translation was projected using surtitles on a screen above the stage. The New York Times reported the show’s losses as $300,000.

== Synopsis ==
Rome, 1830. the story starts with Rugantino, a poor man who loves playing pranks and jokes and trick others. He has been punished for one of his latest scams and he is confronted by Rosetta, a beautiful woman married to Gnecco, a very jealous man.

Rugantino bets with his friends that he will be able to woe her before the "Lanternoni" festival and if he does not manage, he will be happy to accept a punishment.

At the same time Rugantino is looking after Eusebia, his ex lover, who is now in need of help. He finds Mastro Titta, an executioner, would be a good option for her and Rugantino could also trick him into helping him. Rugantino introduces them, hiding Titta's job to Eusebia and introducing her as his sister.

With Gnecco away from Rome, Rugantino continues to court Rosetta and convinces her to meet him at Campo Vaccino, where the two have a romantic meeting and end up falling in love. Rugantino hides this to his friends, preferring to pay the price for having lost the bet.

Gnecco returns to Rome, but he is killed. Rugantino decides to come forward as the killer, to show Rosetta he is "a real man", but runs away and hides in Mastro Titta's house when the police arrives. He's found and taken to prison, where he confesses to Mastro Titta that he is innocent. When Rosetta arrives and confesses her love, Rugantino decides not to confess the truth and to endure his punishment, being hanged.

== Cast and productions ==
Character	1962	1978	2024
Rugantino	Nino Manfredi	Enrico Montesano	Michele La Ginestra
Rosetta	Lea Massari	Alida Chelli	Serena Autieri
Eusebia	Bice Valori	Bice Valori	Edy Angelillo
Mastro Titta	Aldo Fabrizi	Aldo Fabrizi	Massimo Wertmuller
Gnecco	Fausto Tozzi	Glauco Onorato	Marco Rea

== Song list ==
- "Tirollallero"
- "La morra"
- "La berlina"
- "È bello avé 'na donna dentro casa"
- "Ballata di Rugantino"
- "Ommini, bisommini e cazzabbubboli"
- "Saltarello"
- "Sempre boia è"
- "Ciumachella de Trestevere"
- "Roma nun fa' la stupida stasera"
- "Tira a campà"
- "'Na botta e via"
- "Carnevale"
- "È l'omo mio"
- "Stornelli e finale"
