= Vacation with a Gangster =

- Directed by: Dino Risi
- Written by: Dino Risi; Ennio De Concini
- Produced by: Mario Cecchi Gori
- Starring: Marc Lawrence; Giovanna Pala; Terence Hill
- Cinematography: Piero Portalupi
- Edited by: Franco Fraticelli
- Music by: Mario Nascimbene
- Production company: Mambretti Film
- Distributed by: Lux Film
- Release date: 1952
- Running time: 90 minutes
- Country: Italy
- Language: Italian

Vacation with a Gangster (Italian: Vacanze col gangster) is a 1952 Italian comedy film directed by Dino Risi and starring Marc Lawrence, Giovanna Pala and Terence Hill.

The film's art direction was by Flavio Mogherini.

== Plot ==
A man sentenced to 20 years in prison in the Monteforte prison, while working on creating toys for children, puts a note in a papier-mâché horse in which he claims to have been unjustly imprisoned and appeals to anyone who reads the message to get him out of captivity.

The horse, after alternating events, is collected in pieces in the hands of five schoolmates, Gianni, Andrea, Mario, Ugo and Nino, who find the note written by the prisoner. They then plan an escape and plan to all be promoted to go on vacation to Monteforte.

Summer arrives, and the boys anonymously send a cake to the prisoner, the convict n. 5823 with a ticket but the prisoner is in the cell together with no. 6211, a dangerous criminal, with whom he shares the cake and who, unfortunately, also finds the ticket.

By chance or by fate, even the members of the clan of prisoner 6211 are about to implement an escape plan to free their partner and take advantage of it.

The beautiful singer Amelia is also part of the criminal company, who, once they meet the boys, makes them believe that the life prisoner is her brother, so that the boys hasten the escape plan, freeing the gangster Jack Menotti.

The boys hide the fugitive in an abandoned boat, but realize too late that they have been deceived. Fortunately, the police arrive and handcuff the criminal and, some time later, will put convict no. 5823 in freedom.

== Production ==
Produced by Antonio Mambretti for the Mambretti Cinematographic Production, the film was shot in 1951 in Rome in the Titanus studios of the Farnesina. The film was released in theaters the following year.

The film sees the debut of Mario Girotti, then 12, later known as Terence Hill, in the role of Gianni, the orphan leader who pushes the team to the enterprise.

== Cast ==
- Marc Lawrence as Jack Mariotti
- Giovanna Pala as Amelia
- Terence Hill as Gianni
- Lamberto Maggiorani as Il galeotto innocente N. 5823
- Gaetano Pessina as Andrea
- Luciano Caruso as Mario
- Alfredo Baldieri as Nino
- Antonio Machi as Ugo
- Silvio Bagolini as Teacher
- Dina Perbellini
- Anna Arena
- Bianca Doria
- Teresa Macri
- Mario Balice
- Aldo Alimonti
- Mario Galli
- Mario Cianfanelli
