= Alida Chelli =

Italian singer and actress (1943–2012)

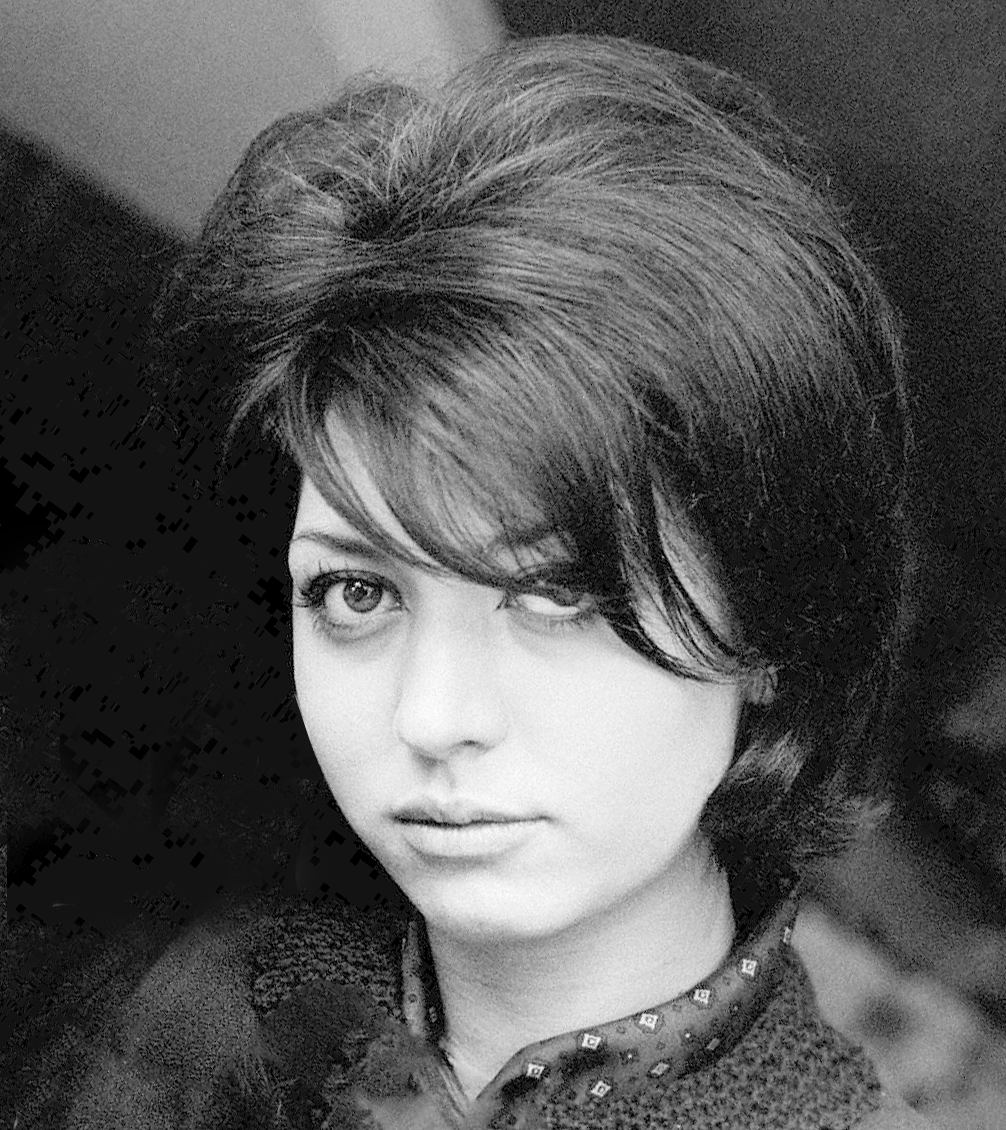
- Chelli in 1961

Background information
- Born: Alida Rustichelli; 23 October 1943; Carpi, Kingdom of Italy
- Died: 14 December 2012 (aged 69) Rome, Italy
- Occupations: Singer; actress
- Instrument: Vocals
- Years active: 1959–1992
- Labels: RCA Italiana; Cinevox

Alida Rustichelli (23 October 1943 – 14 December 2012), known professionally as Alida Chelli (Italian pronunciation: [aˈliːda ˈkɛlli]), was an Italian singer and actress, mainly known for her appearances in stage musicals.

== Biography ==
=== Early life and career ===
Alida Rustichelli was born in Carpi, Emilia-Romagna, the daughter of composer Carlo Rustichelli and sister of composer Paolo Rustichelli. She achieved her first success as singer, with the song "Sinnò me moro", which opens the 1959 film The Facts of Murder.

Then, Chelli achieved a major fame on stage, starring in a number of successful musical comedies such as Rugantino (1978, together with Enrico Montesano), Cyrano (1979, with Domenico Modugno), and Aggiungi un posto a tavola (1990, with Johnny Dorelli). She has also appeared in several films, mainly comedies, and TV-shows.

=== Personal life and death ===
Chelli married Italian actor Walter Chiari in 1969, and together they had one son, television presenter Simone Annicchiarico (Chiari's real surname). After their 1972 divorce, Chelli had a relationship with television presenter Pippo Baudo.

She died in Rome on 14 December 2012, aged 69, after a long illness.

== Filmography ==
=== Films ===
Year	Title	Role(s)	Notes
1959	The Facts of Murder	Singer at opening scene	Cameo appearance
1965	The Sucker	Gina	
1965	Up and Down	The girl	
1966	They're a Weird Mob	Giuliana	
1967	L'uomo dal colpo perfetto	Ulla Helger	
1967	Quando dico che ti amo	Sandra	
1969	Gli infermieri della mutua	Rossella	
1981	Spaghetti a mezzanotte	Zelmira Demma	

=== Television ===
Year	Title	Role(s)	Notes
1961	Giallo club. Invito al poliziesco	Judy	Episode: "Omicidio ceco"
1969	Geminus	Caterina Malfatti	Main role; 6 episodes
1973	Docteur Caraïbes	Carmela	Episode: "Le pigeon bleu"
1992–1994	Casa dolce casa	Sofia	Main role; 60 episodes
