= A Qualcuna Piace Calvo =

- Directed by: Mario Amendola
- Written by: Ottavio Poggi; Milton Krims
- Produced by: Roberto Amoroso
- Starring: Antonio Cifariello; Magali Noël; Roberto Risso; Gisella Sofio
- Cinematography: Roberto Gerardi
- Edited by: Antonietta Zita
- Music by: Armando Trovajoli
- Distributed by: Variety Distribution
- Release date: 1959
- Running time: 96 minutes
- Country: Italy
- Language: Italian

A Qualcuna Piace Calvo is a 1959 Italian film, directed by Mario Amendola, starring Magali Noël, Antonio Cifariello, Roberto Risso and Gisella Sofio.

== Plot ==
Giovanna has taken an infatuation with a film actor who has a bald head as a particular sign. The star needs a person to help him deal with the correspondence of his numerous admirers. Giovanna doesn't think twice and, disguising herself as a man, she gets hired as a typist for her secretary. The actor decides to replace his old harpist; the young musician Marcella shows up at the announcement, but the place is reserved for men only. She too decides to dress up as a man and gets the job.

== Cast ==
- Antonio Cifariello as Alberto Rossi
- Magali Noël as Marcella Salustri
- Roberto Risso as Renato Salustri
- Gisella Sofio as Giovanna
- Glamor Mora as Alicia Morena
- Tiberio Murgia as Rosario De Luca
- Rossana Rossanigo as Lucia
- Alberto Sorrentino as Moreno
- Pupella Maggio as Madre di Marcella
- Lydia Johnson as Gertrude Robinson
- Giuseppe Porelli as Peppino
- Loretta Capitoli as Invitata
- Alfredo Rizzo as Agente
- Dina De Santis as Cameriera
- Enzo Garinei as Portiere d'albergo
- Rhea Capparelli as Lolita
- Edda Ferronao as Invitata
- Mario Carotenuto as Ispettore
- Tino Carraro as John Bryll
- Joe Sentieri as Cantante del Sing-Sing
- Giuliano Gemma as Uomo in ascensore

== Censorship ==
When A Qualcuno Piace Calvo was first released in Italy in 1959, the Committee for the Theatrical Review of the Italian Ministry of Cultural Heritage and Activities approved the film for viewing provided that the scene in which the woman is wearing a revealing teddy and wiggling her hips voluptuously to draw the man's attention was removed. The official document number is: 30901, it was signed on 23 December 1959 by Minister Domenico Magrì.
