= Cantachiaro =

Italian weekly satirical magazine (1944–1948)

- Editor: Franco Monicelli
- Categories: Satirical magazine
- Frequency: Weekly
- Founder: Raffaello Ferruzzi; Franco Monicelli
- Founded: 1944
- Final issue: 1948
- Country: Italy
- Based in: Rome
- Language: Italian

Cantachiaro (Italian: Sing clearly; Italian pronunciation: [ˌkantaˈkjaːro]) was an Italian weekly satirical magazine which had a radical anti-Fascist stance. The magazine was in circulation between 1944 and 1948 and was based in Rome, Italy.

== History and profile ==
Cantachiaro was launched shortly after the liberation of Rome from the Fascist forces in 1944. The founders were Raffaello Ferruzzi and Franco Monicelli. The latter also edited the magazine which was headquartered in Rome. It was published on a weekly basis and adopted a radical anti-Fascist stance. In December 1944 Cantachiaro published the speech of Benito Mussolini delivered in Milan in 1943. It was regarded as a sabotage by the communist newspaper l'Unità, and Cantachiaro was suspended by the Allies for one week for this publication. Cantachiaro published cartoons of the politicians, including Prime Minister Ferruccio Parri. The magazine folded in 1948.

== Legacy ==
In September 1944 a musical satirical theatre group was named after the magazine. It was started by two magazine contributors, namely Pietro Garinei and Sandro Giovannini.
