= Gisella Sofio =

Italian actress (1931–2017)

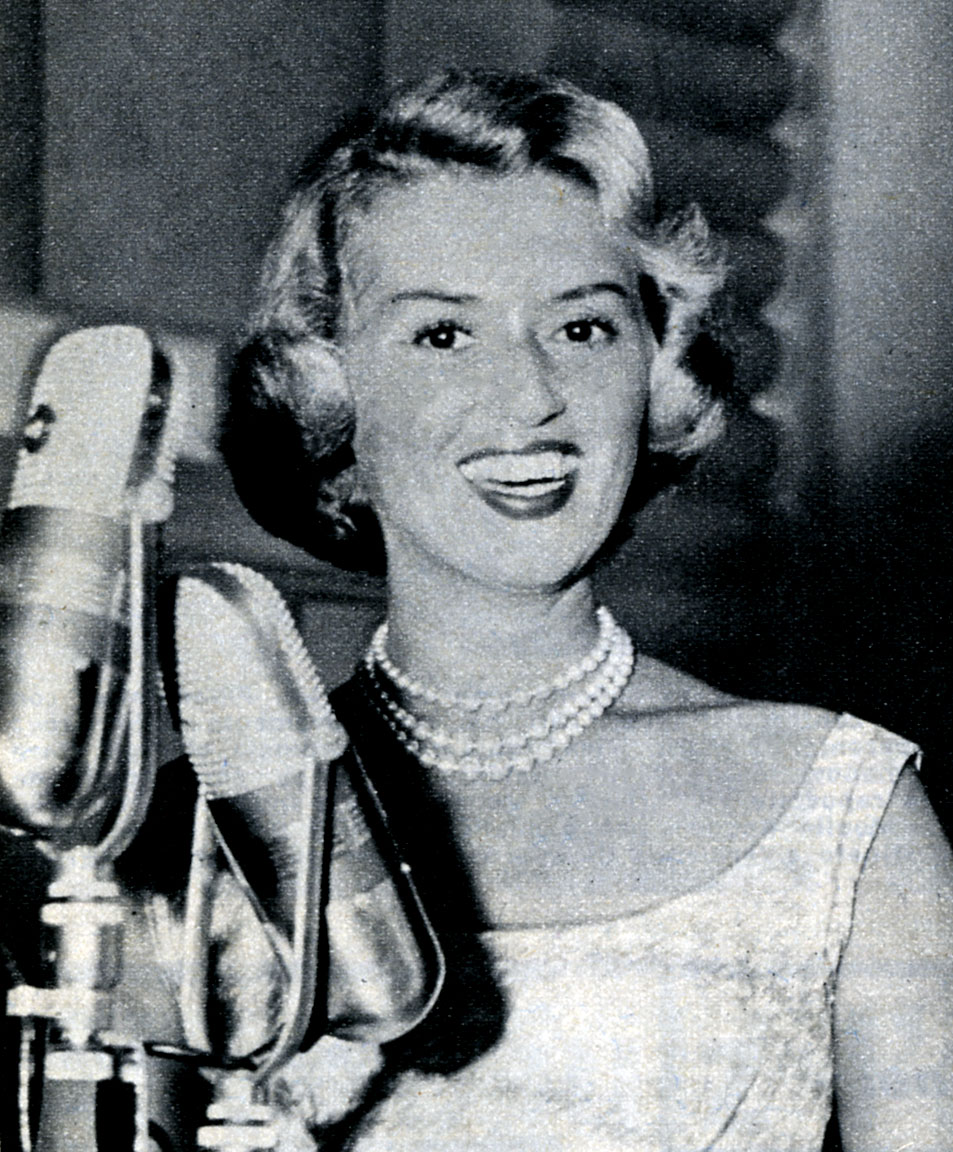
- Sofio in 1957
- Born: 19 February 1931; Milan, Italy
- Died: 27 January 2017 (aged 85); Rome, Italy
- Occupation: Actress
- Height: 1.68 m (5 ft 6 in)

Gisella Sofio (19 February 1931 – 27 January 2017) was an Italian actress.

== Life and career ==
Born in Milan, Sofio started her career at the age of 16 as a model. In 1951 she began her acting career in Mario Mattoli's film Accidents to the Taxes!!. Since then she had a prolific career as an actress in theatres, movies, and television, working with directors like Michelangelo Antonioni, Luigi Comencini and Pupi Avati.

Sofio died on 27 January 2017 in Rome at the age of 85.

== Partial filmography ==
- Accidents to the Taxes!! (1951) - Silvia
- The Steamship Owner (1951) - La coreografa
- Il microfono è vostro (1951) - Maria Variani
- Viva il cinema! (1952)
- Hello Elephant (1952) - Fidanzata del maestro
- Er fattaccio (1952)
- The Lady Without Camelias (1953) - Simonetta Rota's Friend
- Cronaca di un delitto (1953) - Sorella di Elena
- Una donna prega (1953) - Silvana
- Sul ponte dei sospiri (1953) - Barberina
- Viva la rivista! (1953)
- Rascel-Fifì (1957) - La signora al telefono
- Angel in a Taxi (1958) - Suor Celeste
- Via col para... vento (1958)
- Caporale di giornata (1958) - Maria
- My Wife's Enemy (1959) - RCA Worker
- Destinazione Sanremo (1959) - Rosetta
- Quel tesoro di papà (1959) - Mafalda
- La cento chilometri (1959) - The Chic Lady in the Bar
- I mafiosi (1959) - Giornalista Snob
- Spavaldi e innamorati (1959) - Serafina
- Perfide.... ma belle (1959) - Luciana
- Femmine di lusso (1960) - Mariella
- A Qualcuna Piace Calvo (1960) - Giovanna
- Rage of the Buccaneers (1961) - Rosita, Manuela's maid
- Lo smemorato di Collegno (1962) - Giornalista Milanese
- L'assassino si chiama Pompeo (1962) - Police Commissioner De Santis' Wife
- Latin Lovers (1965) - Signorina Beata (segment "Il telefono consolatore")
- Vacanze sulla neve (1966)
- La vuole lui... lo vuole lei (1968) - Gisella
- Story of a Woman (1970) - Mrs. Curtis
- La ragazza del prete (1970) - Antonella, la direttrice del collegio
- La liceale (1975) - Elvira, Loredana's Mother
- The School Teacher in the House (1978) - Teresa / Marcello's mother
- L'insegnante al mare con tutta la classe (1980) - Wife of Headmaster
- Eugenio (1980) - Grandmother Edvige
- Gian Burrasca (1982) - Margherita Stoppani
- Italiani a Rio (1987) - Moglie del commendatore
- Cain vs. Cain (1993) - Giuliana
- Peggio di così si muore (1995) - Anna's mother
- Simpatici & antipatici (1998)
- Cucciolo (1998) - Lucia
- Incontri proibiti (1998) - Nun at hospital
- The Bodyguard's Cure (2006) - Madre di Gorilla
- Fuoco su di me (2006) - Giocatrice
- No Problem (2008) - Signora Pairo
- Torno a vivere da solo (2008) - Giacomo's mother
- Alice (2010) - Nonna di Alice
- Wedding in Paris (2011) - Nonna
- The Worst Week of My Life (2011) - Nonna
- The Big Heart of Girls (2011) - Olimpia Osti
- The Unlikely Prince (2013) - Anziana Contessa
- Il crimine non va in pensione (2017) - Ersilia (final film role)
