= Mamma Mia, What an Impression! =

1951 Italian film by Roberto Savarese

- Directed by: Roberto Savarese
- Written by: Alberto Sordi; Cesare Zavattini
- Produced by: Alberto Sordi; Vittorio De Sica
- Starring: Alberto Sordi; Giovanna Pala; Carlo Giustini
- Cinematography: Carlo Montuori
- Edited by: Eraldo Da Roma
- Music by: Angelo Francesco Lavagnino
- Production company: Produzione Films Comici
- Distributed by: ENIC
- Release date: 21 March 1951
- Running time: 98 minutes
- Country: Italy
- Language: Italian

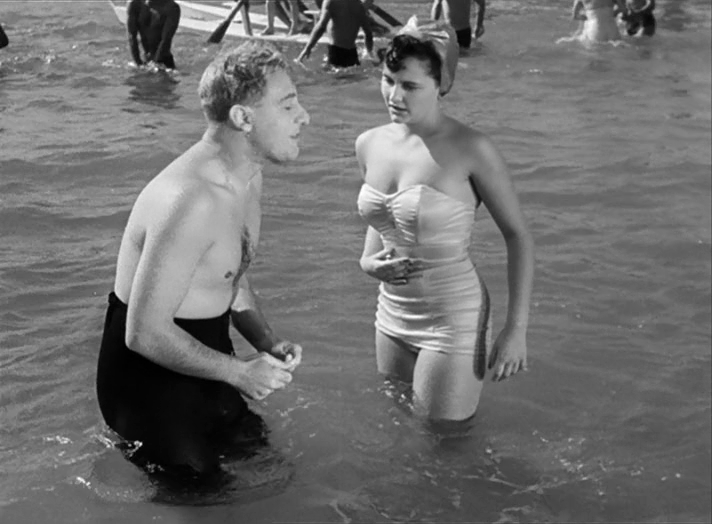
Sordi and Pala

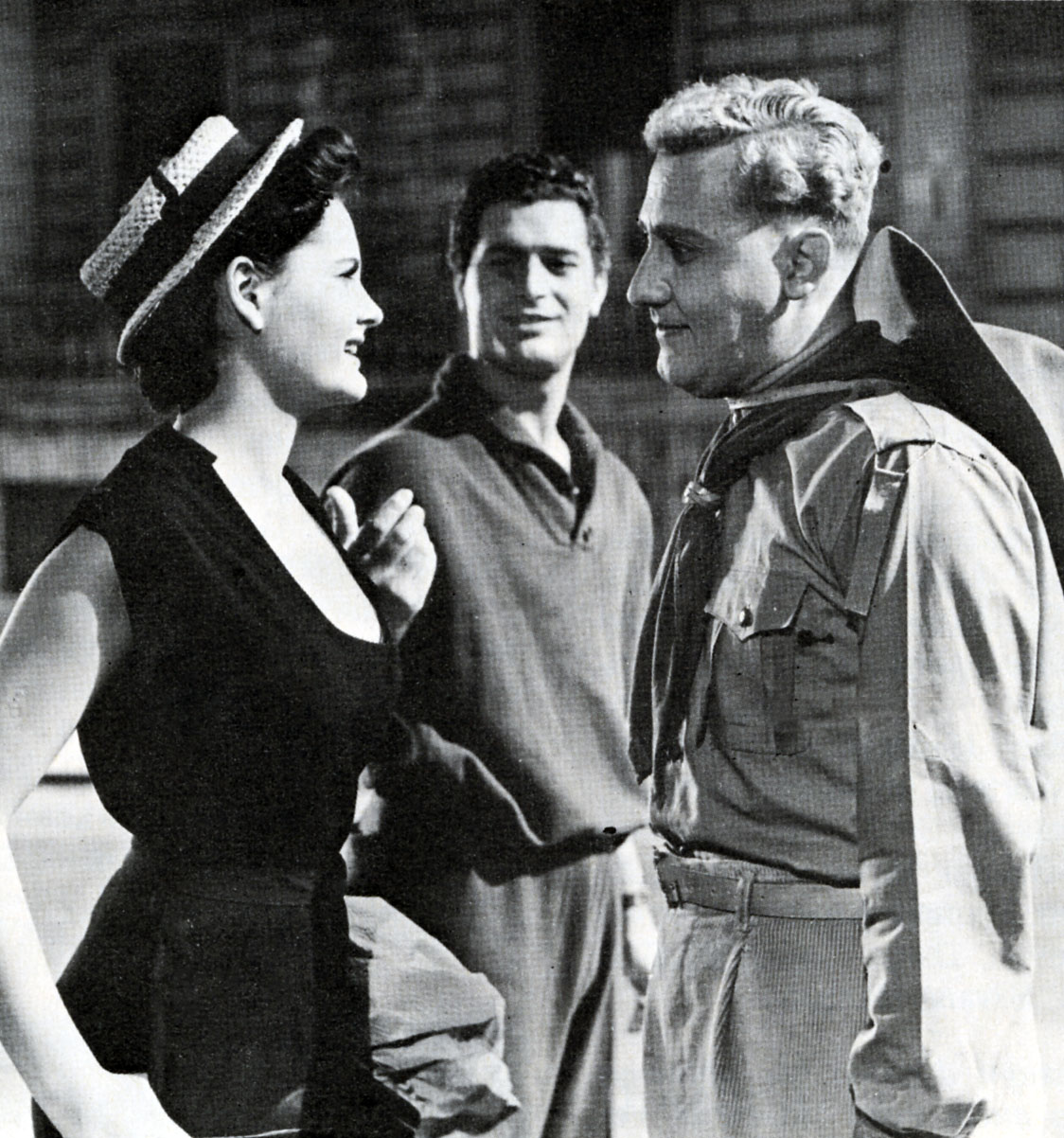
Pala, Giustini and Sordi

Mamma Mia, What an Impression! (Italian: Mamma mia, che impressione!) is a 1951 Italian comedy film directed by Roberto Savarese and starring Alberto Sordi, Giovanna Pala and Carlo Giustini.

It was shot at the Farnesina Studios of Titanus in Rome. The film's sets were designed by the art director Alfredo Montori. It earned around 90 million lira at the box office.

== Synopsis ==
Arturo and Alberto compete for the attention of an attractive young woman. While Arturo is a handsome athlete, Alberto is an overbearing idiot. In order to challenge his rival on his own territory Alberto decides to enter a marathon in Rome.

== Cast ==
- Alberto Sordi as Alberto
- Giovanna Pala as La signora Margherita
- Carlo Giustini as Arturo
- Frank Colson as Don Isidoro
- Fausto Guerzoni as Venditore del presepio
- Luigi Pavese as Il giudice di gara
- Checco Rissone as L'uomo del panino
- Vinicio Sofia as L'energumeno
- Riccardo Bertazzolo as Il bagnino
- Carlo Delle Piane as Testa di triangolo
- Franco Randisi as L'antipatico
- Marco Tulli as Ortelli
- Aldo Trifiletti as Gualandri
- Alberto D'Amario as Il colonnello Pisacane

== Bibliography ==
- Chiti, Roberto & Poppi, Roberto. Dizionario del cinema italiano: Dal 1945 al 1959. Gremese Editore, 1991.
