= Romance (1986 film) =

- Directed by: Massimo Mazzucco
- Written by: Luca Barbareschi; Walter Chiari; Massimo Mazzucco; Lucia Maria Zei
- Produced by: Camilla Nesbitt; Paolo Pagnoni
- Starring: Walter Chiari; Luca Barbareschi
- Cinematography: Fabio Cianchetti
- Edited by: Rene Condoluci
- Music by: Andrea Centazzo
- Release date: 1986
- Running time: 88 minutes
- Country: Italy
- Language: Italian

Romance is a 1986 Italian drama film directed by Massimo Mazzucco. It was entered into the main competition at the 43rd Venice International Film Festival, in which Walter Chiari won the Pasinetti Award for best actor. For his performance Chiari also won the Ciak d'oro for best actor.

== Plot summary ==
Andrea (Luca Barbareschi), a successful fashion designer, is struggling with his past. After twenty years of estrangement, he visits his father (Walter Chiari) in an attempt to reconcile. During their time together in the mountains, the father struggles with his feelings for a fourteen-year-old girl, while Andrea grapples with the possibility of an extramarital affair, all in an attempt to repair their relationship and confront their marital struggles.

== Cast ==
- Walter Chiari as Giulio
- Luca Barbareschi as Andrea
- Patrizia Fachini as Andrea's Wife
- Giancarlo Garbelli as The Coach
- Regina Nitsch as The Lover
