= Armando Fragna =

Italian composer

- Born: 2 August 1898; Torre Annunziata, Naples
- Died: 15 August 1972 (aged 74); Livorno

Armando Fragna (2 August 1898 – 15 August 1972) was an Italian composer, conductor and musician.

== Life and career ==
Born in Torre Annunziata, Naples, at just 18 years old Fragna started a long collaboration with Ettore Petrolini as the score composer of his theatrical works. In 1930 he started a career as a film score composer. In 1942 he entered EIAR as the conductor of its "Orchestra Nostrana". He also composed several pop songs, and two of them entered the competition at the Sanremo Music Festival. Among his most successful songs, "I pompieri di Viggiù" and "I cadetti di Guascogna".

== Selected filmography ==
- The Haller Case (1933)
- Just Married (1934)
- The Little Schoolmistress (1934)
- Those Two (1935)
- The Phantom Gondola (1936)
- The Amnesiac (1936)
- The Castle Ball (1939)
- Red Tavern (1940)
- The Firemen of Viggiù (1949)
- Totò Tarzan (1950)
- The Count of Saint Elmo (1950)
- The Cadets of Gascony (1950)
- The Steamship Owner (1951)
- Toto the Third Man (1951)
- I'm the Capataz (1951)
- The Ungrateful Heart (1951)
- Accidents to the Taxes!! (1951)
- The Piano Tuner Has Arrived (1952)
- Deceit (1952)
- Sardinian Vendetta (1952)
- Ivan, Son of the White Devil (1953)
- If You Won a Hundred Million (1953)
