= Mario Abbate =

Italian singer and actor (1927–1981)

Mario Abbate (Naples, 8 August 1927 – Naples, 6 August 1981) was an Italian singer and actor, famous as an exponent of Neapolitan songs. He appeared in three Italian movies: Naples Sings (1953), It Happened at the Police Station (1954), and Treasure of San Gennaro (1966). He died on 6 August 1981, at age 53.

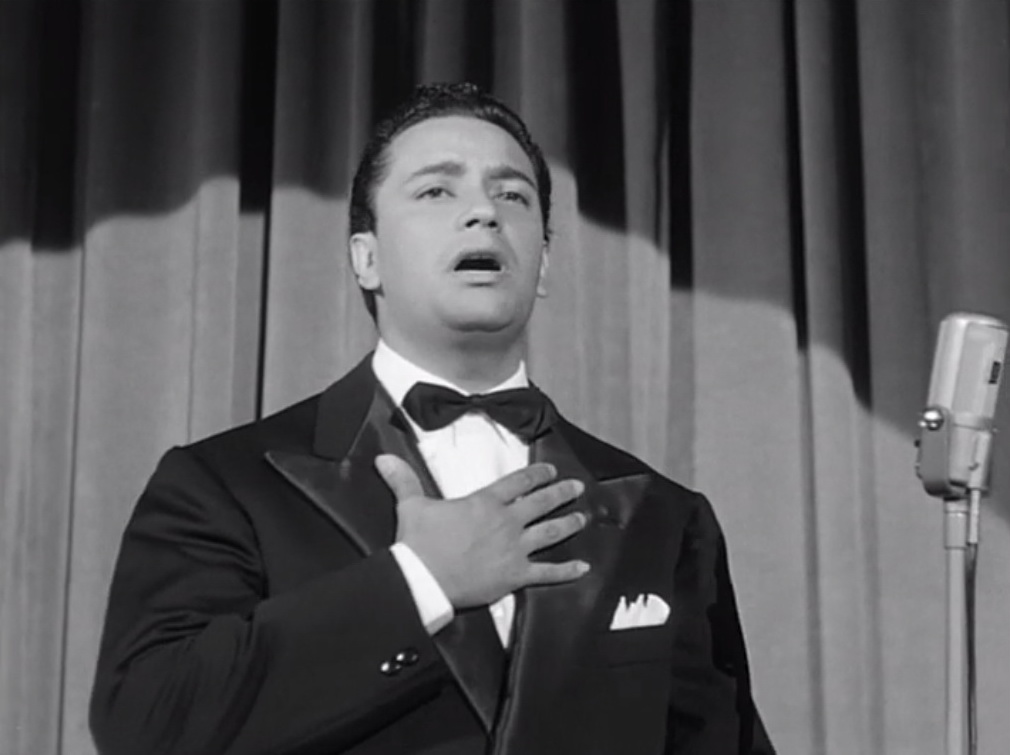
Mario Abbate as the singer Lucio Davila in It Happened at the Police Station (1954)
