= The Cadets of Gascony =

1950 film

- Directed by: Mario Mattoli
- Written by: Marcello Marchesi; Vittorio Metz; Agenore Incrocci; Furio Scarpelli; Nino Rastelli
- Produced by: Isidoro Broggi
- Starring: Walter Chiari; Carlo Campanini; Mario Riva
- Cinematography: Aldo Tonti
- Edited by: Giuliana Attenni
- Music by: Armando Fragna
- Production company: Excelsa Film
- Distributed by: Minerva Film
- Release date: 27 September 1950
- Running time: 86 minutes
- Country: Italy
- Language: Italian

The Cadets of Gascony (Italian: I cadetti di Guascogna) is a 1950 Italian comedy film directed by Mario Mattoli and starring Walter Chiari, Carlo Campanini and Mario Riva. It was shot at the Farnesina Studios in Rome, with sets designed by the art director Leonidas Marcolis. Location shooting took place at Bracciano in Lazio where the film is set. It earned 450 million lira at the Italian box office.

== Synopsis ==
Walter and Ugo are both in love with the same girl Vittoria, but her disapproving aunt sends her away to Bracciano. Unknown to her both men are called up for military service and are posted to the town. They arrange a rendezvous with her at a cinema but, confined to barracks and unable to attend, they send their fellow soldier Nino along. To their irritation, Vittoria falls in love with Nino. To try and sabotage this they promote the rumour that Nino is engaged in an affair with an attractive soubrette. In fact she is his sister, in town with her touring musical troupe. Eventually all is resolved happily, with the soldiers participating in a show billed as "The Cadets of Gascony".

== Cast ==
- Walter Chiari as Walter Mantoni
- Carlo Campanini as Sergente Composti
- Mario Riva as Mario Fantoni
- Riccardo Billi as Riccardo Bolletta
- Ugo Tognazzi as Ugo Bossi
- Virgilio Riento as Angelo Danati
- Fulvia Mammi as Vittoria
- Alda Mandini as Bice
- Gianni Musi as Nino Quaranta
- Ada Dondini as Zia Adelina
- Eveline Saffi as Dea Nuccis
- Wanda Parisi as Self
- Ebe Parisi as Self
- Diana Dei as Caterina
- Carlo Croccolo as Soldato Pinozzo
- Nerio Bernardi as Il colonnello
- Enzo Garinei as Il farmacista
- Aldo Giuffrè as Un caporale

== Bibliography ==
- Chiti, Roberto; Poppi, Roberto (1991). Dizionario del cinema italiano: Dal 1945 al 1959. Gremese Editore.
