= Carlo Croccolo =

Italian actor (1927–2019)

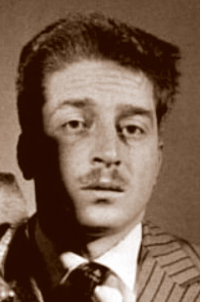
- Croccolo during the 1950s
- Born: 9 April 1927; Naples, Italy
- Died: 12 October 2019 (aged 92); Castel Volturno, Italy
- Occupations: Actor; voice actor; director; screenwriter
- Years active: 1949–2019
- Height: 1.70 m (5 ft 7 in)

Carlo Croccolo (9 April 1927 – 12 October 2019) was an Italian actor, voice artist, director and screenwriter.

== Biography ==
Born in Naples, Croccolo began his acting career on the radio and appeared in more than 100 films since 1949. His debut came in the 1949 film The Firemen of Viggiù and he made his first television debut in 1956. He also had an intense career onstage, as he often starred in plays directed by Eduardo De Filippo and Giorgio Strehler. Croccolo was best known for his collaboration with Antonio "Totò" De Curtis, mainly throughout the 1950s and 1960s.

In the early 1950s, he replaced Alberto Sordi performing the Italian voice of Oliver Hardy in the redubs of Laurel and Hardy made between 1951 and 1953, in which he was paired with Fiorenzo Fiorentini (who provided the Italian voice of Stan Laurel); he came back to dubbing Hardy in the 1968-1970 redubs, this time paired with Franco Latini. Since 1957, Croccolo also served as a dubbing artist for Totò in some of his films, as his friend had gradually lost his sight and had thus become unable to post-synchronize his own lines: having previously dubbed Totò in French during his stay in Canada and due to his ability in imitating his speech, Croccolo was chosen by the artist himself to dub his voice in Italian when needed.

In 1989, Croccolo received the David di Donatello for best supporting actor in the film 'O Re. Croccolo's international notoriety came in 1996 with the film In Love and War, directed by Richard Attenborough.

Croccolo died in his home in Castel Volturno on 12 October 2019 at the age of 92. His funeral was held in the Church of San Ferdinando and his body was cremated at the request of the family.

== Selected filmography ==
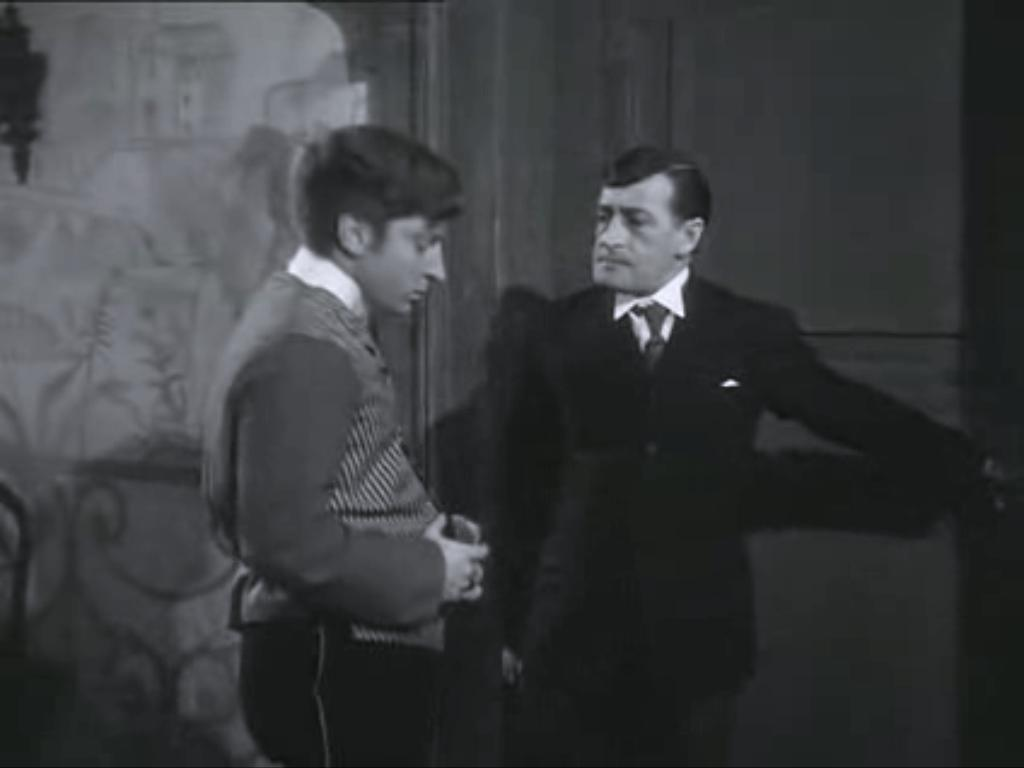
Croccolo (left) with Totò in 47 morto che parla (1950)

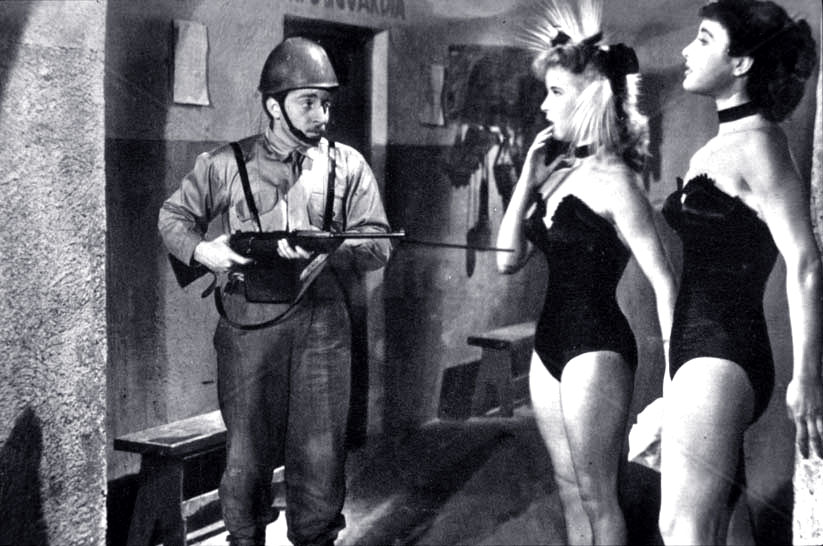
Croccolo (left) with Silvana Pampanini and Delia Scala in Beauties on Bicycles (1951)

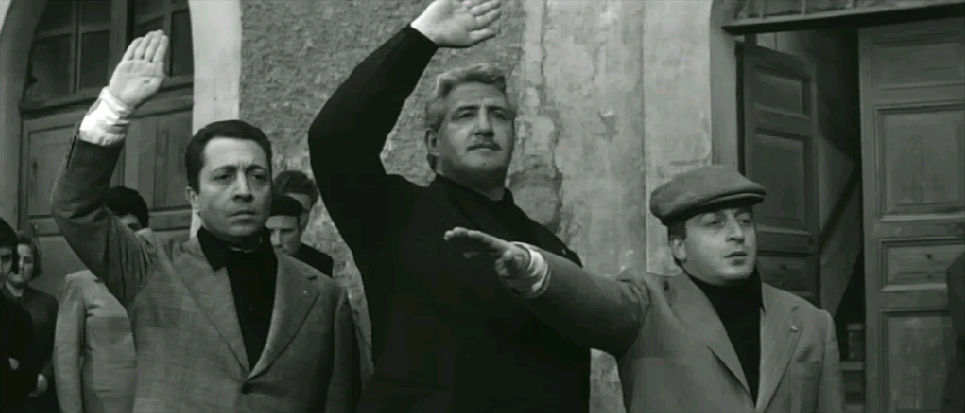
Croccolo (right) with Mario Carotenuto and Aroldo Tieri in Gli eroi del doppio gioco (1962)

- The Firemen of Viggiù (1949) - Fireman from Piemont
- L'inafferrabile 12 (1950) - Il barbiere
- The Cadets of Gascony (1950) - Soldato Pinozzo
- Totò Tarzan (1950) - Lo sposino
- Toto the Sheik (1950) - Il cameriere
- 47 morto che parla (1950) - Gondrano, il cameriere
- Beauties on Bicycles (1951) - Pinozzo
- Il caimano del Piave (1951) - Esposito
- Arrivano i nostri (1951) - Karl, il guardino del circo
- La paura fa 90 (1951) - Pinotto, guardiano in prima
- Stasera sciopero (1951) - Pasquale
- Tizio, Caio, Sempronio (1951)
- Porca miseria (1951) - Carletto Esposito aka Professore Sik-Sik
- Licenza premio (1951) - Pinozzo Molliconi
- Free Escape (1951) - Pinozzo Molliconi
- Ha fatto 13 (1951) - Mario Rossi
- Auguri e figli maschi! (1951) - Toniotto
- Sardinian Vendetta (1952) - Pinuccio Porchiddu
- The Eternal Chain (1952) - Peppino
- Ragazze da marito (1952) - Salvatore
- Primo premio: Mariarosa (1952)
- Non è vero... ma ci credo! (1952) - Alberto Sammaria
- The Daughter of the Regiment (1953)
- Siamo tutti Milanesi (1953)
- The Count of Saint Elmo (1953) - Alberico
- Gran varietà (1954) - Battaglia, il comico 'militare' (episodio 'Cruttica')
- Poverty and Nobility (1954) - Luigino
- Red and Black (1954)
- Di qua, di là del Piave (1954)
- Assi alla ribalta (1954) - Himself
- Altair (1956) - Labbate
- I pinguini ci guardano (1956)
- Totò lascia o raddoppia? (1956) - Camillo
- Cerasella (1959)
- Gentlemen Are Born (1960) - Battista
- My Friend, Dr. Jekyll (1960) - Arguzio
- The Two Rivals (1960) - Carletto
- Fountain of Trevi (1960) - Ali Baba
- Appuntamento a Ischia (1960) - Carletto
- Five Day Lover (1961) - Marius
- Pulcinella, cetrulo di Acerra (1961) - Pulcinella
- Hercules in the Valley of Woe (1961) - Fetonte
- Pesci d'oro e bikini d'argento (1961)
- Mina... fuori la guardia (1961) - Carletto
- Fra' Manisco cerca guai (1961) - Fra Leone
- Jessica (1962) - Beppi Toriello
- The Reluctant Saint (1962) - The Gobbo - the Hunchback
- Gli eroi del doppio gioco (1962) - Secondo Rossi
- Noches de Casablanca (1963)
- Yesterday, Today and Tomorrow (1963) - Auctioneer (segment "Adelina")
- The Four Musketeers (1963)
- Panic Button (1964) - Guido
- I marziani hanno 12 mani (1964) - X2
- Freddy in the Wild West (1964) - Sheriff Mickey Stanton
- The Yellow Rolls-Royce (1964) - Michele, Mrs. Millett's chauffeur
- Non son degno di te (1965) - Pinosso Morricone
- Me, Me, Me... and the Others (1966) - JokingTraveller
- Dio, come ti amo! (1966) - Gennaro
- After the Fox (1966) - Café Owner
- How I Learned to Love Women (1966) - Direttore autosalone
- Perdono (1966) - Policeman
- Testa di rapa (1966) - Il Brigante Salomone
- Treasure of San Gennaro (1966) - Various characters (voice)
- The Biggest Bundle of Them All (1968) - Franco
- Danger: Diabolik (1968) - Lorry Driver
- Gunman of One Hundred Crosses (1971) - Slim - Stuttering Henchman
- Black Killer (1971) - Fred, Deputy Sheriff
- Le seminariste (1976) - San Giulivo
- Goodnight, Ladies and Gentlemen (1976) - Tax Inspector (uncredited)
- Passi furtivi in una notte boia (1976) - Ragionier Dolci
- Beach House (1977) - Carlo
- Where's Picone? (1984) - Barone Armato
- Massimamente folle (1985)
- The Professor (1986)
- ’O Re (1987) - Rafele
- Via Lattea... la prima a destra (1989)
- The Miser (1990) - Mastro Simone
- In the Name of the Sovereign People (1990) - Carlo Bonaparte
- In camera mia (1992)
- Camerieri (1995) - Salvatore Azzaro
- Men Men Men (1995) - Peppino
- Il cielo è sempre più blu (1996)
- Giovani e belli (1996) - Bonafoni
- In Love and War (1996) - Town Mayor
- A Cold, Cold Winter (1996) - Dr Crocchia
- Commercial Break (1997) - Ciro Esposito
- Three Men and a Leg (1997) - Cecconi, father in law
- Li chiamarono... briganti! (1999) - Vincenzo, il calzolaio
- La vita, per un'altra volta (1999) - Cesari
- Terra bruciata (1999) - Maresciallo
- Ogni lasciato è perso (2001) - Primario
- Il commesso viaggiatore (2001)
- Amore con la S maiuscola (2002) - Pasquale
- Il quaderno della spesa (2003) - Cavalier Angelo Marconi
- Cose da pazzi (2005) - Nonno
- Italian Dream (2007)
