= Peter Tevis =

American singer

Peter Tevis (born 10 February 1937, in Santa Barbara, California, USA, died 13 September 2006 in Mercer Island, Washington) was an American folk singer best remembered for his work on the soundtracks of composer Ennio Morricone.

Tevis met Morricone while living in Italy in the 1960s, and suggested working together. A 1962 recording of the song "Pastures of Plenty" by Woody Guthrie became a small hit single (RCA PM45-3115). Morricone later reworked it into the title theme of the famous Spaghetti Western movie "A Fistful of Dollars" directed by Sergio Leone and starring Clint Eastwood (without Tevis lyrics). Later they continued to collaborate on a number of recordings. Tevis is credited with singing the lyrics of songs on the soundtracks of several Spaghetti Western movies, including:

- "A Gringo Like Me" from the film Gunfight at Red Sands + ((Album*))
- "Lonesome Billy" from the film Bullets Don't Argue + ((Album*))
- "Per un Pugno di Dollari" (A Fistful of Dollars) + ((Album*))
- "High noon" ((Album*))
- "The Green Leaves Of Summer" ((Album*))
- "Blowin 'in the wind" ((Album*))
- "Shenadoah" ((Album*))
- "Ghost Riders In The Sky" ((Album*))
- "Freight Train" ((Album*))
- "Where Have All The Flowers Gone" ((Album*))
- "Ridin 'Into Town" ((Album*))
- "A Western Man" ((Album*))
- "Io Non Sono Quello" ((Single))
- "A man must fight" ((Single)) + ((Soundtrack from the Movie 7 dollari sul rosso))it:7 dollari sul rosso
- "Il Mondo Passa"
- "Gli Intoccabili" ((Single))
- "La Canzone Mark Donen"
- "Neoclassic time"
- "Special agent"
- "Atomic twist"
- "Pastures Of Plenty ((Single))
- "Maria" ((Single))
- "A Lone And Angry Man" ((Single))
- "Stanotte Si"
- "Notte Infinita" ((Single))
- "Una Bara Per Lo Sceriffo"
- "It's nothing (non è niente)"
- "Young Jim Hart"
- "You song to me"
- "Stubborn baby"
- "It's nothing (non è niente)"
- "Notte Infinita" ((Single))
- Album – Peter Tevis Con Ennio Morricone E La Sua Orchestra* – Un Pugno Di ... West (Celebri Canzoni "Western") – 1964/65

Tevis was also credited as the singer of the theme song of the animated series Underdog (TV series) in the 1960s, but on the US Wikipedia page for the series, Robert Ragaini is named, who also remembered the recording.

In the 1970s, Tevis ran a record label called Pet Records, based in Burbank, California. The label released records designed to train pet birds to talk as well as other pet training records. The word pet also stood for "Peter Edward Tevis."

Tevis was married to actress Tiffany Bolling from 1969 to 1970.

In his latter years he suffered from Parkinson's disease and nearly lost his voice.

== Filmography ==
Year	Title	Role	Notes
1964	A Fistful of Dollars	Bandleader	Voice, Uncredited
