= Spaghetti a mezzanotte =

1981 film by Sergio Martino

- Italian theatrical release poster by Enzo Sciotti
- Directed by: Sergio Martino
- Written by: Sergio Martino
- Produced by: Luigi Borghese
- Starring: Lino Banfi; Barbara Bouchet
- Cinematography: Giulio Albonico
- Edited by: Eugenio Alabiso
- Music by: Detto Mariano
- Distributed by: Medusa
- Release date: 1981
- Running time: 91 min.
- Language: Italian

Spaghetti a mezzanotte, a.k.a. Spaghetti at Midnight, is a 1981 Italian comedy film directed by Sergio Martino.

== Plot ==
In 1980s Asti, Italy, a lawyer with a cheating wife and dangerous lover has to deal with a Mafia boss who demands his services with a gunman who tries in vain to hide at his villa.

== Cast ==
- Lino Banfi: Avv. Savino Lagrasta
- Barbara Bouchet: Celeste Lagrasta
- Alida Chelli: Zelmira Demma
- Teo Teocoli: Arch. Andrea Soldani
- Pippo Santonastaso: Cesare Picotto, "Cesarino"
- Daniele Vargas: Ulderico Demma, the judge
- Ugo Bologna: Don Vito Malisperi
- Jacques Stany: Saruzzo
