= Anna Maestri =

Italian actress (1924–1988)

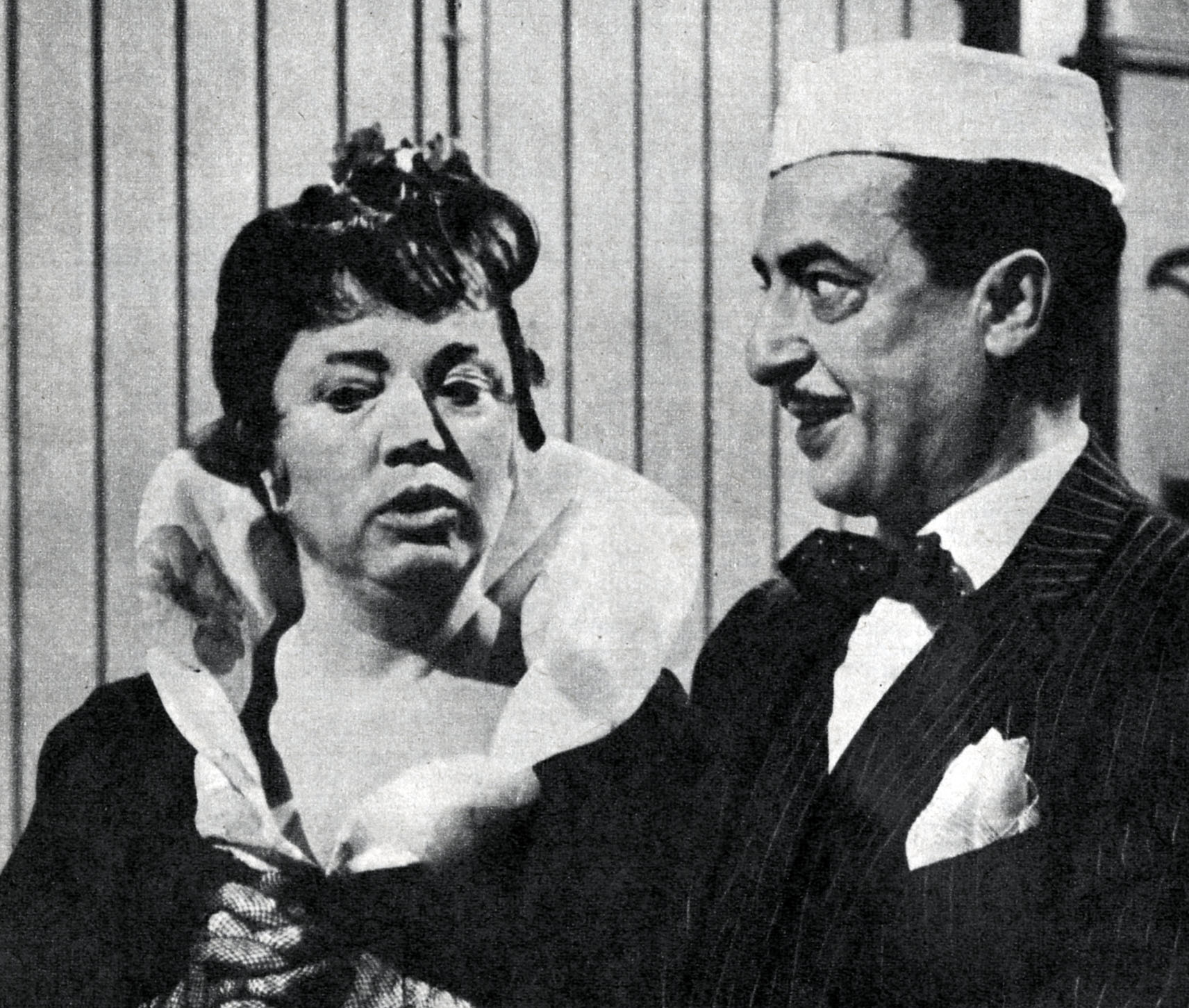
- Maestri and Nino Taranto in 1963
- Born: 7 January 1924; Mantua, Kingdom of Italy
- Died: 4 March 1988 (aged 64); Trento, Italy
- Occupation: Actress

Anna Maestri (7 January 1924 – 4 March 1988) was an Italian stage, film and television actress.

== Life and career ==
Maestri was born in Mantua, the daughter of two stage actors. She formed at the Silvio d’Amico Academy of Dramatic Arts in Rome, and made her professional debut on stage in 1943 alongside Vittorio Gassman. After the war she worked several times with Luchino Visconti, Luigi Squarzina and with Giorgio Strehler at the Piccolo Teatro in Milan. She was also active in musical comedies and revues, notably starring in Il terrore corre sul filo alongside Nino Taranto. In 1963 she was awarded the San Genesio Prize for her performance in Robert Thomas' Eight Women. Maestri was also active in films and on television, even if mainly cast in supporting roles.

== Filmography ==
Year	Title	Role	Notes
1941	Teresa Venerdì	Un'orfanella dell'istituto	Uncredited
1942	Nothing New Tonight	Un ospite dell'istituto	
1948	Be Seeing You, Father	La cameriera negra	
1949	Bitter Rice	Irene	
1949	La roccia incantata		
1950	Toto Looks for a Wife	La nera australiana	
1950	Women Without Names	Woman Prisoner	
1951	Accidents to the Taxes!!	La signorina Colombi	
1951	Tragic Spell	Oliva's Maid	
1951	The Steamship Owner	Una cameriera d'albergo	
1952	Sardinian Vendetta	Gavina Leoni	
1953	Perdonami!		
1959	Toto in Madrid	La signora del treno	
1959	Lui, lei e il nonno		
1961	Come September	Maria - Maid	Uncredited
1962	Marco Polo		
1963	Follie d'estate	Signora sabina brutta	
1964	Europa: Operazione Strip-tease		
1964	Gli eroi di ieri... oggi... domani		
1966	Honeymoon, Italian Style	Pallina	
1970	W le donne	Don Nicola's wife	
1971	Tre nel mille		
1971	Armiamoci e partite!		
1973	My Pleasure Is Your Pleasure		
1974	Abbasso tutti, viva noi		
1976	The Two Orphans		
1983	Occhei, occhei	Nonna	
