= Gli imbroglioni =

1963 film directed by Lucio Fulci

- Directed by: Lucio Fulci
- Screenplay by: Mario Guerra; Vittorio Vighi; Lucio Fulci; Franco Castellano; Pipolo Pregadio
- Story by: Mario Guerra; Vittorio Vighi; Lucio Fulci; Franco Castellano; Pipolo Pregadio
- Produced by: Dario Sabatello
- Edited by: Gisa Radicchi Levi
- Music by: Carlo Rustichelli
- Production companies: Produzione D.S.; Tecisa Film
- Distributed by: Cineriz
- Release dates: September 25, 1963 (Turin); November 21, 1964 (Barcelona)
- Running time: 98 minutes
- Countries: Italy; Spain

Gli imbroglioni (lit. 'The Swindlers') is a 1963 comedy film written and directed by Lucio Fulci and starring Franco and Ciccio.

== Plot ==
The film takes place in a court of law and is divided into an anthology format, spotlighting four criminal cases. The defendants consist of the following: a wealthy industrialist charged with fraud, two nuns who have gotten in trouble with the guardian of their order, the president of a football team implicated in illegal sporting activities, and two Sicilian businessmen who conned some investors into believing they have discovered an archaeological find.

== Cast ==
- Walter Chiari as Dr. Mario Corti
- Antonella Lualdi as Sister Celestina
- Raimondo Vianello as Tabanelli
- Franco Franchi as Salvatore Di Carmine / Rizzo / Sposito
- Ciccio Ingrassia as Napoleone Palumbo / Nostradomine / Roccanera
- Luciana Gilli as Liliana Ferri
- Elio Crovetto as Gustav Schultz
- Xenia Valderi as Lilliana's mother
- Aroldo Tieri as Oscar Taverna
- Dominique Boschero as Oscar's Wife
- Umberto D'Orsi as Lucarini
- Pietro De Vico as chancellor
- Mario Scaccia as Mario's attorney
- Camillo Mastrocinque as Spianelli's attorney
- Seyna Seyn as Chinese girl
- Oreste Lionello as supermarket manager
- Claudio Gora as Spianelli
- Alberto Bonucci as The President
- Margaret Lee as Adelina

== Production ==
Gli imbroglioni was as an Italian and Spanish co-production between the Rome based Produzione D.S. and the Madrid based Tecisa Film. The film was one of the many Italian film a episodi of the 1950s and 60s, which were multi-story comedy films that were popular during this period. The film's script was by Fulci and two different writing teams: Franco Castellano and Pipolo Pregadio who wrote the segment "Medico e fidanzata" and Mario Guerra and Vittorio Vighi who worked on the Franco and Ciccio scenes.

It was shot in June 1963.

== Release ==
Gli imbroglioni was released first in Turin on September 25, 1963. It was later released in October 30 in Rome.

It was later released in Spain first in Barcelona on November 21, 1964 followed by a screening in Madrid on April 18, 1965.The film's title in Spain is Los mangantes (lit. 'The Crooks').
