= Mario Riva =

Italian actor (1913–1960)

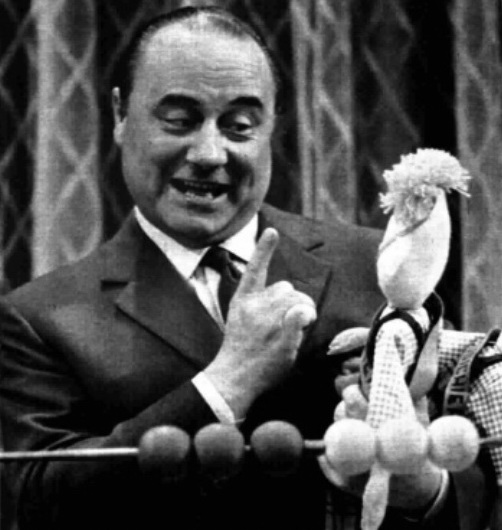
- Riva in the TV-show Il Musichiere (1958)
- Born: Mario Bonavolontà; 26 January 1913; Rome, Italy
- Died: 1 September 1960 (aged 47); Verona, Italy
- Occupations: Actor, television presenter
- Years active: 1941–1960

Mario "Mariuccio" Bonavolontà (26 January 1913 – 1 September 1960), professionally known as Mario Riva, was an Italian television presenter and actor. He appeared in 51 films between 1941 and 1960.

== Life and career ==
Born in Rome as Mario Bonavolontà, the son of composer Giuseppe Bonavolontà (1886–1957) and his wife Teresa Chinzari. His father composed over 500 popular tunes including "Fiocca la neve". Mario attended the Collegio San Giuseppe in Piazza di Spagna in Rome.

Riva debuted at young age as a dubber and a radio actor. His film debut was in 1941 in Due cuori sotto sequestro (Two Hearts Seized). He became first known as presenter of the stage show Clan (1942).

After a long season of successes on stage (often in couple with Riccardo Billi) Riva reached the peak of his career with the RAI variety television Il Musichiere (1957–1960), the Italian version of Name That Tune. He also appeared on several films, usually in supporting roles. While he was presenting from the Verona Arena the Secondo Festival del Musichiere (a special event linked to the TV program), he inadvertently fell into a hole in the stage covered with a tarpaulin and died from his injuries a few days later.

== Selected filmography ==
- Due cuori sotto sequestro (1941) – singer
- Toto Tours Italy (1948) – Giovanni
- Baron Carlo Mazza (1948) – announcer
- The Firemen of Viggiù (1949)
- Yvonne of the Night (1949) – the cigarette boy
- Adam and Eve (1949) – the Russian castaway
- Toto Looks For a House (1949) – the owner of the agency
- Se fossi deputato (1949) – Giuseppino
- Ho sognato il paradiso (1950)
- The Cadets of Gascony (1950) – Mario Fantoni
- Tomorrow Is Another Day (1951) – Pasquale
- Arrivano i nostri (1951) – Mario
- Accidents to the Taxes!! (1951) – Mario
- The Steamship Owner (1951) – Mario
- My Heart Sings (1951) – Mario
- Porca miseria (1951) – Count Cerri
- Ha fatto tredici (1951) – himself
- Sardinian Vendetta (1952) – Mario
- Abracadabra (1952) – Amleto
- In Olden Days (1952) – picky customer (segment "Il carrettino dei libri vecchi")
- Giovinezza (1952) – peddler
- Beauties on Motor Scooters (1952)
- Easy Years (1953) – Mario Paolella
- Siamo tutti milanesi (1953)
- The Country of the Campanelli (1954) – magician Tarquinio
- It Happened at the Police Station (1954) – the second tram driver
- Tripoli, Beautiful Land of Love (1954) – Giulio Cesare
- Laugh! Laugh! Laugh! (1954) – Otello Spinotti
- Scuola elementare (1955) – Pilade Mucci, the school caretaker
- It Happened at the Police Station (1955) – inmate No. 77
- La moglie è uguale per tutti (1955) – Mario Rivetti
- Bravissimo (1955) – the dance teacher
- Roman Tales (1955) – the waiter at the restaurant
- Motivo in maschera (1955)
- Il campanile d'oro (1955)
- I giorni più belli (1956) – Nicola, the delicatessen seller
- Arrivano i dollari! (1957) – Cesaretto Pasti
- Serenate per 16 bionde (1957) – Pippo
- Gente felice (1957) – Francesco
- A sud niente di nuovo (1957)
- Ladro lui, ladra lei (1958) – commendatore Stefano Maghetti
- È arrivata la parigina (1958) – Strettani
- I prepotenti (1958) – Domenico Esposito
- Toto, Peppino and the Fanatics (1958) – Caprioli's boss
- Gli zitelloni (1958) – the judge
- Sergente d'ispezione (1958) – Turconi
- Mia nonna poliziotto (1958) – Mario Secchioni
- Il terribile Teodoro (1958)
- Domenica è sempre domenica (1958) – himself
- Fantasmi e ladri (1959) – Edmondo Natale
- Prepotenti più di prima (1959) – the traffic warden
- Policarpo (1959) – the fireman at the theatre (uncredited)
- Perfide.... ma belle (1959) – Romolo Proietti
- Il raccomandato di ferro (1959) – Augusto Zinconi
- The Traffic Policeman (1960) – himself
