= Auguri e figli maschi! =

- Directed by: Giorgio Simonelli
- Written by: Age & Scarpelli
- Cinematography: Alvaro Mancori
- Music by: Carlo Innocenzi
- Release date: 1951
- Country: Italy
- Language: Italian

Auguri e figli maschi! is a 1951 Italian film directed by Giorgio Simonelli.

== Plot ==
A marshal's daughters are engaged to three boys, but they can't get married because they can't find apartments to live in on their own. The boys finally find a place to live in peace, but a scammer tricks them into getting married quietly. The boys later found themselves amazed at the ruin of the house. The three couples try them all: from a beauty pageant to a dating house and finally choosing the definitive accommodation in their father-in-law's house.

== Cast ==
- Delia Scala: Silvana
- Maria Grazia Francia: Miranda
- Giovanna Pala: sister of Silvana
- Ugo Tognazzi: Mario
- Aroldo Tieri: Ruggero
- Enrico Luzi: Carmine
- Carlo Croccolo: Antoniotto
- Franca Tamantini: Paciottini's lover
- Guglielmo Inglese: Vincenzo
- Checco Durante: controllore
- Nico Pepe: presentatore
