= Giuseppe Garinei =

Italian painter

Giuseppe Garinei (1846 – ?), was an Italian painter. He created still life paintings and scenes of small town mundanity. His work has been auctioned by Christie's as well as Bonhams.
