= Accidents to the Taxes!! =

1951 film

Accidenti alle tasse!!
- Directed by: Mario Mattoli
- Written by: Mario Mattoli
- Produced by: Dino De Laurentiis, Carlo Ponti
- Cinematography: Tonino Delli Colli
- Edited by: Giuliana Attenni
- Music by: Armando Fragna
- Production company: Ente Nazionale Industrie Cinematografiche
- Release date: 13 September 1951
- Running time: 92 minutes
- Country: Italy
- Language: Italian

Accidents to the Taxes!! (Italian: Accidenti alle tasse!!) is a 1951 Italian comedy film directed by and written by Mario Mattoli.

== Cast ==
- Riccardo Billi as Gaetano Pellecchia
- Mario Riva as Mario
- Dorian Gray as Margot
- Aroldo Tieri as Il principe Oli
- Silvana Jachino as Signora Penna
- Gianni Cavalieri as Teodoro Penna
- Gisella Sofio as Silvia
- Pina Renzi as Madame Costanza
- Alberto Sorrentino as Arturo
- Giuseppe Porelli as Il conte Raffaele Borraciolo
- Anna Maestri as La signorina Colombi
- Loris Gizzi as Il capufficcio tasse
- Clara Bindi as Signora Martinelli
- Pina Piovani as La guardiana del collegio 'Le Mimose'
- Nietta Zocchi as Insegnante di francese
- Liana Billi as Giovanna, moglie di Gaetano
- Guglielmo Barnabò as Il gran khan
- Enzo Garinei as Lo snob
- Nico Pepe as Un professore
