= Pietro Garinei =

Italian playwright, actor, and songwriter (1919-2006)

Pietro Garinei (1 February 1919 – 9 May 2006) was an Italian playwright, actor, and songwriter. Brother of Enzo Garinei.

== Biography ==
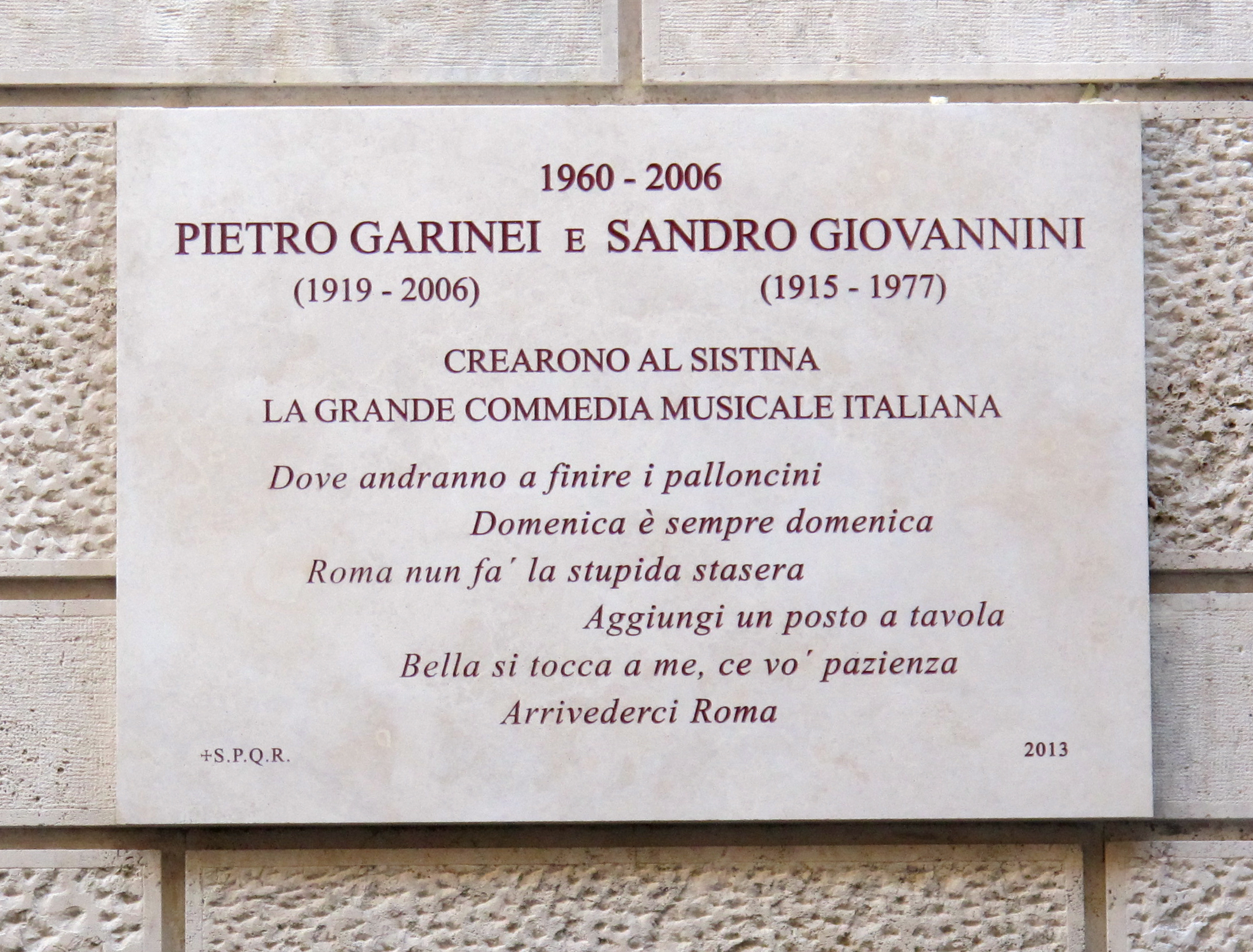
Commemorative plaque in Rome, Italy

Garinei was born in Trieste in 1919. He later worked as a sports journalist for the daily newspaper in Milan and Rome, where he met Sandro Giovannini. The two discovered a shared interest in music and entertainment, and left the paper shortly after to found a satiric newspaper. In September 1944 they established a musical theater, Cantachiaro, which was named after a weekly satirical magazine they had contributed to. The first star of their theater was Anna Magnani.

Following the end of World War II, Garinei and Giovannini collaborated with the Radio RAI. In 1949 they started working as playwrights, and in 1952 they wrote one of Italy's first musical comedy, Attanasio cavallo vanesio, featuring Renato Rascel. Garinei and Giovaninni also wrote a series of musicals such as Un paio d'ali, Ciao Rudy, Rugantino, Aggiungi un posto a tavola. Actors who regularly performed in their comedies include Nino Manfredi, Gino Bramieri, Sandra Mondaini, Walter Chiari, Domenico Modugno, Massimo Ranieri, Raffaella Carrà, Marcello Mastroianni, Giulio Scarpati and Nancy Brilli.

Garinei and Giovannini also wrote the lyrics for many pop songs, including "Arrivederci Roma" and "Domenica è sempre domenica".

Garinei died in Rome in 2006 at age 87.
