= Massimo Mazzucco =

Italian filmmaker (born 1954)

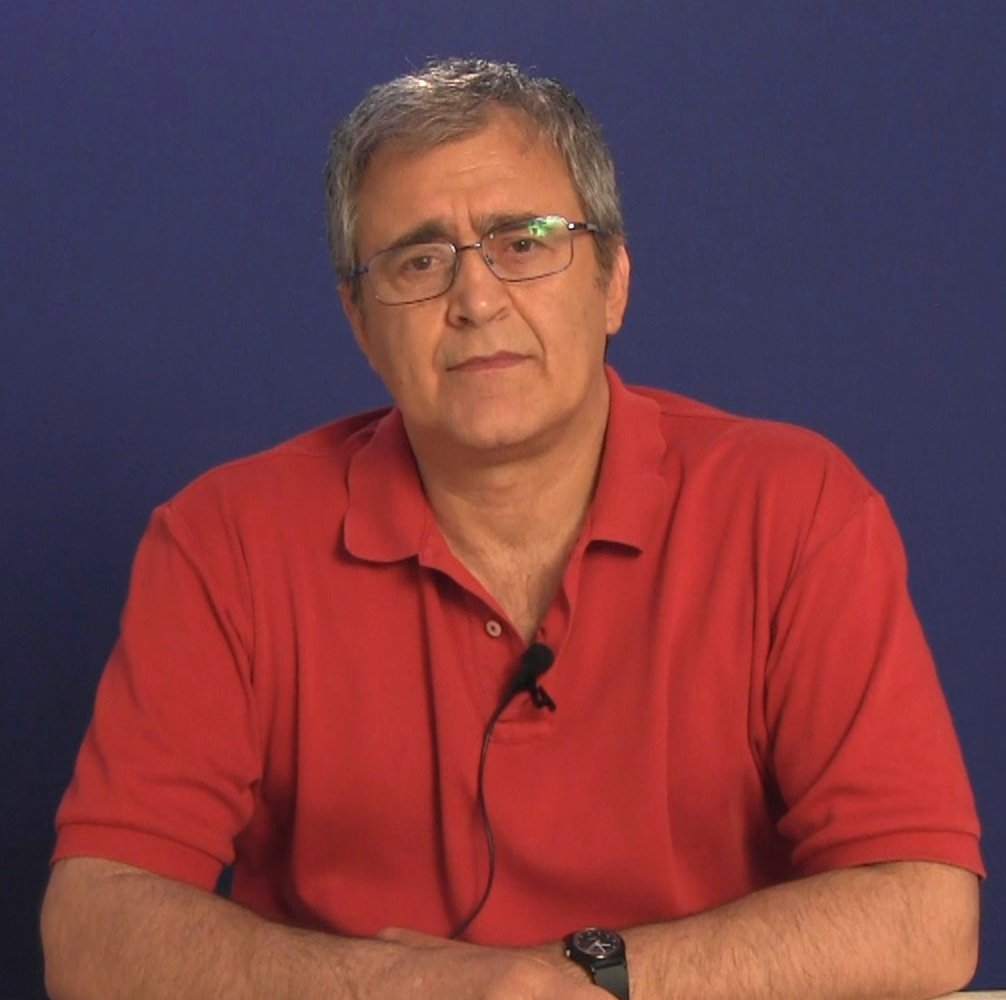
- Born: 20 July 1954 (age 71); Turin, Italy
- Occupations: Film maker, Screenwriter, director
- Height: 1.73 m (5 ft 8 in)

Massimo Mazzucco (born 20 July 1954 in Turin) is an Italian filmmaker and conspiracy theorist who has produced documentary films such as: "American Moon", The New American Century and Cancer -The Forbidden Cures. Mazzucco is also the administrator of luogocomune.net, an Italian news site concentrating mostly on the September 11 WTC attacks and the conspiracy theories about it.

== Filmography ==
=== Feature films ===
- Summertime – 1982

Winner: De Sica Price, Venice Film Festival 1983.
Valencia Film Festival 1983, Sidney Film Festival 1984

- Romance – 1986

Walter Chiari, Luca Barbareschi.
Winner: Golden Globe Foreign Press (Italy)
Winner: Pasinetti Prize for Best Actor (W. Chiari) Venice Film Festival 1986.
London Film Festival 1986. Melbourne Film Festival 1986

- Hidden Lens (Obiettivo Indiscreto) – 1992

Luca Barbareschi, Sam Jenkins, Marc De Jonge.

- Shadow of a Kiss (L'Ombra Abitata) – 1994

Michael York, Charlotte Valandray, Florinda Bolkan.

- Aaron Gillespie Will Make You a Star – 1996

Scott Caan, Holly Gagnier, Scott Trost.
Final selection, Hollywood Film Festival 1996.
Montreal Film Festival 1996.

=== Digital format documentaries / DVD ===
- Global Deceit / Inganno Globale – 2006

The first Italian film on 9/11 and broadcast by Berlusconi's Canale 5.

- The New American Century / Il Nuovo Secolo Americano – 2007

A view of America's historical, philosophical, economical and political background.

- The Other Dallas / L'altra Dallas – 2008

A documentary on the RFK assassination that claims the man convicted for the crime, Sirhan Bishara Sirhan -- could not have killed the US senator.

- UFOs and the military elite / I Padroni del Mondo – 2009

A UFO history and the military and American and Russian involvement.

- Cancer: The Forbidden Cures / Cancro: Le Cure Proibite – 2010

Claims that "cures" for cancer proposed in the last 100 years "have been suppressed."

- The True History of Marijuana / La vera storia della Marijuana – 2011

Claims it is a conspiracy, led by the petrochemical industry, that has outlawed cannabis.

- September 11 – The New Pearl Harbor / 11 Settembre – La Nuova Pearl Harbor – 2013

A 5-hour documentary that promotes several 9/11 conspiracy theories and alleges that the resulting analysis by The National Institute of Standards and Technology (NIST) was flawed.

- American Moon – 2017

A documentary attempting to dispute the legitimacy of the Apollo Moon landings.

== Criticism ==
Some criticism was directed to Mazzucco after his decision, starting in September 2008, to publicize an alternative cancer therapy based on sodium bicarbonate proposed by Italian ex-doctor Tullio Simoncini. Said therapy is currently unproven, and Simoncini was expelled from the Italian Medical Association after he was found guilty of fraud and manslaughter, since a patient died, accordingly as result of Simoncini's treatment.
