= Sardinian Vendetta =

1952 film

- Film poster
- Directed by: Mario Mattoli
- Written by: Ruggero Maccari; Mario Monicelli
- Starring: Walter Chiari; Carlo Croccolo; Giovanna Pala
- Cinematography: Mario Albertelli
- Edited by: Mario Serandrei
- Music by: Armando Fragna
- Production company: Excelsa Film
- Distributed by: Minerva Film
- Release date: 21 February 1952
- Running time: 93 minutes
- Country: Italy
- Language: Italian

Sardinian Vendetta (Italian: Vendetta... sarda) is a 1952 Italian comedy film directed by Mario Mattoli and starring Walter Chiari, Carlo Croccolo and Giovanna Pala. It as shot at the Icet Studios in Milan and the Ponti-De Laurentiis Studios in Rome. The film's sets were designed by the art director Alberto Boccianti.

== Synopsis ==
A Sardinian working as a chef in Milan returns to the island believing that he has inherited money from his uncle. Once there he discovers that he has been killed by a rival family, and he quickly finds himself drawn into a local vendetta.

== Cast ==
- Walter Chiari as Gualtiero Porcheddu
- Carlo Croccolo as Pinuccio
- Mario Riva as Mario
- Giovanna Pala as Lulù
- Carlo Campanini as Ottavio
- Franca Marzi as Annesa Leoni
- Benedetta Rutili as Efisia Leoni
- Anna Maestri as Gavina Leoni
- Furio Meniconi as Primo fratello Leoni
- Angelo Dessy as Secondo fratello Leoni
- Ughetto Bertucci as Terzo fratello Leoni
- Mario Feliciani as Zio Porchiddu
- Dorian Gray as Columba Porchiddu
- Rita Andreana as Seconda sorella Porchiddu
- Primarosa Battistella as Terza sorella Porchiddu
- Mariano Laurenti as Rinaldu, fidanzato di Columba
- Guglielmo Inglese as Cavalier Rossetti
- Alberto Sorrentino as Narciso Bellezza
- Giorgio Bixio as Commendatore genovese
- Totò Mignone as Lift all'albergo sardo
- Mimo Billi as Capostazione di Dente di Canu
- Silvana Jachino as Guardarobiera

== Bibliography ==
- Aprà, Adriano. The Fabulous Thirties: Italian cinema 1929-1944. Electa International, 1979.
- Urban, Maria Bonaria. Sardinia on Screen: The Construction of the Sardinian Character in Italian Cinema. Rodopi, 2013.
