= Enzo Garinei =

Italian actor (1926–2022)

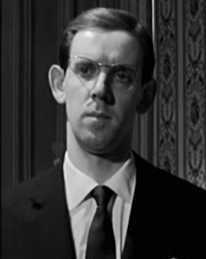
- Garinei in Silver Spoon Set (1960)
- Born: 4 May 1926; Rome, Kingdom of Italy
- Died: 25 August 2022 (aged 96); Rome, Italy
- Other name: Vincenzo Garinei
- Occupation: Actor
- Years active: 1949–2022

Enzo Garinei (4 May 1926 – 25 August 2022) was an Italian film actor. He appeared in nearly 80 films since 1949. He was also a professional voice artist, best remembered as the Italian voice of Sherman Hemsley in the American sitcom The Jeffersons. He was the brother of playwright Pietro Garinei.

Garinei died on 25 August 2022, at the age of 96.

== Selected filmography ==
- Adam and Eve (1949) - Sentinella
- Totò Le Mokò (1949) - La Tulipe (uncredited)
- Little Lady (1949) - Assistente del notaio
- Il vedovo allegro (1949)
- Toto Looks for a Wife (1950) - Il figlio di Bellavista
- The Cadets of Gascony (1950) - Il farmacista
- Bluebeard's Six Wives (1950) - Paesano (uncredited)
- Arrivano i nostri (1951) - Direttore di 'Chez Moi'
- Accidents to the Taxes!! (1951) - Lo snob
- Toto the Third Man (1951) - Cicognetti - il segretario communale
- Five Paupers in an Automobile (1952)
- Funniest Show on Earth (1953) - Altro presentatore (uncredited)
- Two Nights with Cleopatra (1953) - Mercante (uncredited)
- The Doctor of the Mad (1954)
- Le signorine dello 04 (1955) - Spider Owner
- Toto and Carolina (1955) - Dott. Rinaldi
- Toto in Hell (1955)
- Roman Tales (1955) - The Car Dealer (uncredited)
- Eighteen Year Olds (1955) - Stalliere
- Il coraggio (1955) - Uomo giovane (uncredited)
- Colégio de Brotos (1955) - Judge of the Beauty Contest (uncredited)
- A Woman Alone (1956) - Ciccio, il fotografo (uncredited)
- The Bigamist (1956) - Journalist (uncredited)
- The Most Wonderful Moment (1957) - Dr. Serafini
- La canzone del destino (1957) - Renzo
- Serenate per 16 bionde (1957) - Ugo
- The Love Specialist (1957) - Piero's friend (uncredited)
- Malafemmena (1957) - Corteggiatore di Rosa
- Rascel-Fifì (1957) - Il Principe
- L'ultima violenza (1957)
- Napoli, sole mio! (1958) - Dott. Enrico Matteini
- Maid, Thief and Guard (1958) - Il medico (uncredited)
- Sunday Is Always Sunday (1958) - Pinuccio
- Toto, Peppino and the Fanatics (1958) - The Journalist
- Valeria ragazza poco seria (1958)
- Rascel marine (1958) - Marine
- Mia nonna poliziotto (1958) - Scrittore Gattinelli
- Toto in Madrid (1959) - Lover
- My Wife's Enemy (1959) - Scienziato tedesco
- La duchessa di Santa Lucia (1959) - Archibald
- La cento chilometri (1959) - The Photographer
- Guardatele ma non toccatele (1959) - Aviere direttore orchestrina
- Il raccomandato di ferro (1959)
- Simpatico mascalzone (1959) - Giancarlo
- Tu che ne dici? (1960) - The Fashion Designer
- Howlers in the Dock (1960) - Carimiei
- Silver Spoon Set (1960) - Guglielmo Bodoni aka Sisino
- Fountain of Trevi (1960) - E.T.I.B. Manager (uncredited)
- A Qualcuna Piace Calvo (1960) - Portiere d'albergo
- Ferragosto in bikini (1960) - Il bagnante delle parole crociate
- Girl with a Suitcase (1961) - Pino
- Shivers in Summer (1964) - Balestrazzi
- Cleopazza (1964)
- I marziani hanno 12 mani (1964) - X3
- I Kill, You Kill (1965) - Psicanalista (segment "Giochi acerbi")
- Soldati e caporali (1965) - Il Caporale
- Latin Lovers (1965) - Fifì (segment "L'irreparabile")
- Don Chisciotte and Sancio Panza (1968) - Governor counselor
- Let's Have a Riot (1970) - Examiner
- La prima notte del Dottor Danieli, industriale, col complesso del... giocattolo (1970) - Chevron
- The Fourth Victim (1971) - The Priest
- Hospitals: The White Mafia (1973) - Dr. Botti
- No, the Case Is Happily Resolved (1973) - Redattore Capo
- Savage Three (1975) - Direttore del centro ricerche
- La portiera nuda (1976) - Rag. Battistoni
- A Summer in the Country (1980) - Luca's Father
- Cameriera senza... malizia (1980) - Don Peppino
- La dottoressa di campagna (1981) - Farmacista
- Pierino contro tutti (1981) - Cliente del negozio di ferramenta
- Albergo a ore (1981) - (uncredited)
- Porno sogni superbagnati (1981) - Isidore
- Madly in Love (1981) - console, segretario di Gustavo
- Pierino medico della Saub (1981) - Addetto alle assunzioni
- Lea (1981)
- Banana Joe (1982) - Engineer Moreno
- Biancaneve & Co... (1982) - Stronzolo
- Crime in Formula One (1984) - Coroner
- Cop in Drag (1984) - Judge
- Il ragazzo di campagna (1984) - Manager of apartment house
- Roba da ricchi (1987) - Psychiatrist
- Rimini Rimini - Un anno dopo (1988) - Dottor Achilli / Luciano's friend ('La scelta')
- 100 metri dal paradiso (2012) - Padre Livio
- Appena un minuto (2019) - Vecchio vicino di Mario
- Il gatto e la luna (2019) - Professore
- Rido perché ti amo (2021) - Valentino (final film role)
