= I due pericoli pubblici =

- Directed by: Lucio Fulci
- Screenplay by: Franco Castellano; Giuseppe Moccia; Lucio Fulci
- Story by: Franco Castellano; Giuseppe Moccia; Lucio Fulci
- Starring: Franco Franchi; Ciccio Ingrassia; Margaret Lee; Linda Sini; Poldo Bendandi; Riccardo Garrone; Mino Doro; Luciana Angiolillo; Corrado Olmi; Gianni Dei
- Cinematography: Alfio Contini
- Edited by: Ornella Micheli
- Music by: Piero Umiliani
- Production company: Aster Film
- Distributed by: Medusa Distribuzione
- Release date: January 29, 1965 (Rome)
- Running time: 90 minutes
- Country: Italy
- Box office: ITL 478 million

I due pericoli pubblici (lit. 'The Two Public Enemies') is a 1965 black-and-white Italian comedy film directed by Lucio Fulci starring the comic duo Franco and Ciccio.

== Plot ==
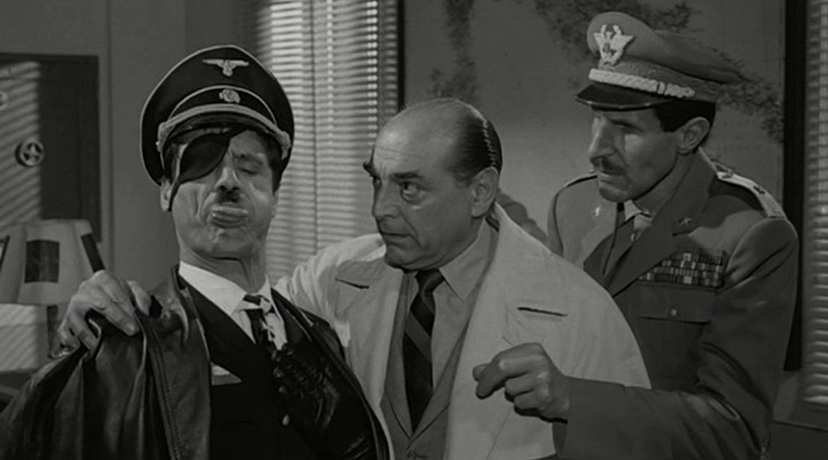
Franco Franchi, Mino Doro and Ciccio Ingrassia in a scene from I due pericoli pubblici

Franco and Ciccio Introlia are two scammers. One day they disguise themselves as NATO officers to try to collect a bribe for a conscription exemption and unwittingly unleash a nuclear aerial retaliation.

== Cast ==
- Franco Franchi as Franco Introlia
- Ciccio Ingrassia as Ciccio Introlia
- Margaret Lee as Floriana
- Linda Sini as Dora
- Riccardo Garrone as "The Baron"
- Luciana Angiolillo as The Wife of the deceased
- Mino Doro - Giorgio's father
- Poldo Bendandi as "Mancino"
- Ignazio Leone as the insurance lawyer
- Gianni Dei as Giorgio
- Franco Morici
- Corrado Olmi as Galanti, financier
- Nino Nini as the municipal police commander
- Salvo Libassi as the museum guard
- Tullo Altamura as the hospital doctor
- Ugo Fangareggi as the radio operator at the ministry
- Nino Marchetti as Marshal

== Background and development ==
Comedy duo Franco and Ciccio were enormously popular in Italy, but outside Italy and Spain, they were relatively unknown. The duo performed in variety shows and theatre in Sicily before having small roles in the films Mario Mattoli's Appuntamento a Ischia (1960) and Vittorio De Sica's The Last Judgment (1961). In 1962, director Lucio Fulci directed his first film starring the Franco and Ciccio, with I due della legione (1962). This led to a string of 13 films Fulci would make with the duo, which included I due pericoli pubblici.

I due pericoli pubblici was an Italian film production from Aster Film. Interiors were shot at De Paolis - Incir Studios in Rome. The film was shot in black and white by Alfio Contini who had previously shot Fulci's Colpo gobbo all'italiana (1962).

== Release and reception ==
I due pericoli pubblici was distributed theatrically in Italy by Medusa Distribuzione. It was released in Rome on January 29, 1965 followed by screenings in Turin on February 27, Fasano on March 21, and Bari on March 25, 1965. In Italy, it grossed a total of 478,000,00 lire.

From contemporary reviews, a reviewer in l'Unità found the antics of Franco Franchi and Ciccio Ingrassia too cloying and said the film as a whole would just cost an audience their money and time.

An Italian contemporary review describes the film as a good entertaining comedy despite obvious flaws in its plot.

== See also ==
- List of Italian films of 1965
