= Enzo Andronico =

Italian character actor (1924–2002)

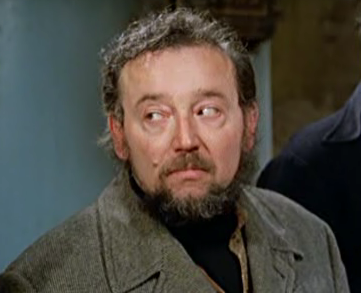
- Andronico in Il clan dei due Borsalini (1971)
- Born: Vincenzo Andronico; 13 May 1924; Palermo, Italy
- Died: 26 September 2002 (aged 78); Palermo, Italy
- Occupation: Actor

Vincenzo "Enzo" Andronico (13 May 1924 – 26 September 2002) was an Italian character actor.

== Career ==
Born in Palermo, Andronico had a prolific career between theater, cinema and television, appearing in more than 100 films.

Andronico made his professional debut in 1944, as part of the comedy trio "Sgambetta" together with Ciccio Ingrassia and the comedian Ciampaolo. Following the death of Ciampolo, after briefly continuing to work with Ingrassia as a duo, he moved to Rome, where he worked with several avanspettacolo companies, notably the ones led by Beniamino Maggio and Fanfulla. He made his film debut in Federico Fellini's I Vitelloni. Andronico's career is mainly linked to the comedy duo Franco and Ciccio, with whom, starting from 1962, he starred in dozens of films and TV-shows.

== Selected filmography ==
- Two Mafiamen in the Far West (1964)
- I due evasi di Sing Sing (1964) as Tristano's henchman in the limousine
- Oh! Those Most Secret Agents! (1964) as Blond Russian agent with pinstripe suit
- I figli del leopardo (1965)
- Latin Lovers (1965)
- Two Sergeants of General Custer (1965)
- Con rispetto parlando (1965)
- Two Mafiosi Against Goldginger (1965)
- 002 Operazione Luna (1965) as the blond clinic henchman
- I due parà (1965) as the cafe owner
- Veneri al sole (1965)
- I due toreri (1965)
- 2 mafiosi contro Al Capone (1966)
- How to Rob the Bank of Italy (1966) as man with a tic
- Password: Kill Agent Gordon (1966)
- Two Sons of Ringo (1966)
- Come rubammo la bomba atomica (1967) as Spectrales henchman
- Il lungo, il corto, il gatto (1967) as Ferdinando
- The Handsome, the Ugly, and the Stupid (1967)
- I barbieri di Sicilia (1967)
- Italian Secret Service (1968)
- T'ammazzo!... Raccomandati a Dio (1968)
- The Nephews of Zorro (1968)
- The Two Crusaders (1968)
- I 2 deputati (1968)
- The Longest Hunt (1968)
- Franco, Ciccio e il pirata Barbanera (1969)
- The Most Beautiful Wife (1970)
- Don Franco e Don Ciccio nell'anno della contestazione (1970)
- I due maghi del pallone (1970)
- Ma che musica maestro (1971)
- The Case Is Closed, Forget It (1971)
- I due assi del guantone (1971)
- Il clan dei due Borsalini (1971)
- Seven Blood-Stained Orchids (1972)
- Avanti! (1972)
- Alleluja & Sartana are Sons... Sons of God (1972)
- I due gattoni a nove code... e mezza ad Amsterdam (1972)
- Ku-Fu? Dalla Sicilia con furore (1973)
- The Inconsolable Widow Thanks All Those Who Consoled Her (1973)
- Il sergente Rompiglioni (1973)
- Innocence and Desire (1974)
- Emergency Squad (1974)
- Piedino il questurino (1974)
- Poker in Bed (1974)
- Farfallon (1974)
- The Family Vice (1975)
- Il giustiziere di mezzogiorno (1975)
- Emmanuelle's Silver Tongue (1976)
- Campagnola bella (1976)
- Roma, l'altra faccia della violenza (1976)
- Special Cop in Action (1976)
- La dottoressa sotto il lenzuolo (1976)
- Assassinio sul Tevere (1979)
- Scusi lei è normale? (1979)
- The Nurse in the Military Madhouse (1979)
- La dottoressa ci sta col colonnello (1980)
- Mia moglie torna a scuola (1981)
- L'onorevole con l'amante sotto il letto (1981)
- A Policewoman in New York (1981)
- I carabbimatti (1981)
- W la foca (1982)
- Delitto sull'autostrada (1982)
- Grand Hotel Excelsior (1982)
- Paulo Roberto Cotechiño centravanti di sfondamento (1983)
- Al bar dello sport (1983)
- È arrivato mio fratello (1985)
- The Blonde (1993)
- The Knights of the Quest (2001)
