= Il lungo, il corto, il gatto =

1967 film directed by Lucio Fulci

- Directed by: Lucio Fulci
- Screenplay by: Gian Paolo Callegari; Roberto Gianviti; Marino Girolami; Amedeo Sollazzo
- Story by: Gian Paolo Callegari; Roberto Gianviti; Marino Girolami; Amedeo Sollazzo
- Starring: Franco Franchi; Ciccio Ingrassia; Ivy Holzer; Giusi Rospani Dandalo
- Cinematography: Guglielmo Mancori
- Edited by: Nella Nannuzzi
- Music by: Lallo Gori
- Production companies: Five Film; Fono Roma
- Distributed by: Rank Film
- Release date: 5 May 1967 (Bari)
- Running time: 90 minutes
- Country: Italy
- Language: Italian

Il lungo, il corto, il gatto (lit. 'The Long, the Short, the Cat') is a 1967 Italian comedy film directed by Lucio Fulci and starring the comic duo Franco and Ciccio.

The film marked the final collaboration between Fulci and Franco and Ciccio, with the director making 13 films with them in total.

== Plot ==
Franco and Ciccio, alongside Gina, are servants to a wealthy elderly countess who believes that her pet cat Archibald is a reincarnation of her late husband. The mischievous cat frequently wanders off, and local business owners take advantage of Franco and Ciccio by charging them for damages the cat supposedly caused. After discovering Archibald 'cheating' on her with a female cat, the Countess dies from shock. Franco and Ciccio kick the cat out of the house, only to learn that they are due to inherit one million lira a month from the late countess on the condition that they care for Archibald. The two track down the cat to a dinner party hosted by a superstitious countess, who allows the two to stay despite their poor etiquette to avoid having thirteen guests at the table. As guests leave due to Ciccio's manners and new ones arrive late to the party, Ciccio is brought back and forth to the table as needed to avoid having thirteen guests, while Franco flirts with a maid.

The two wreck the dinner party after making a mess trying to catch Archibald, but before they're kicked out, the guests learn that they're due to inherit a million lira, and all quickly attempt to find the cat. The next morning, Archibald is spotted entering an embassy. In the embassy, a prime minister is meeting with officials to discuss the threat of being assassinated by The Cat, a mysterious assassin whose identity is unknown. Franco & Ciccio get caught trying to sneak in, and are interrogated by Mr. Smith, an agent from the CIA, who believes the cat they're looking for is the assassin. Using tiny microphones attached to the duo, Mr. Smith and Police Commissioner Proietti spy on them in an attempt to track down the assassin. They overhear Franco & Ciccio asking local business owners about Archibald, and each of them get arrested to be interrogated after the duo leaves. The Cat learns that Franco & Ciccio allegedly know him, and plots to kill them, while authorities plan to use them as bait to catch the assassin.

The Cat holds Franco, Ciccio, and Gina at gunpoint and ties them up, planting a time bomb with them. Archibald topples the bomb off the balcony and into The Cat's car, and it explodes just as he tries to leave. After being untied by authorities, Franco & Ciccio finally catch Archibald, and live at the late countess's villa with Gina.

== Cast ==
- Franco Franchi as Franco
- Ciccio Ingrassia as Ciccio
- Gianni Agus as Gianni
- Ivy Holzer as Gina
- Ivano Staccioli as The Cat
- Giusi Raspani Dandolo as The Countess
- Daniele Vargas as Mr. Smith
- Tano Cimarosa as Dustman
- Enzo La Torre as Police Commissioner Proietti
- Renato Chiantoni as Doctor
- Ugo Fangareggi as Pork Butcher
- Ignazio Leone as Manager of the pool hall
- Andrea Scotti as Ambassador's secretary

== Production ==
Il Lungo, il corto, il gatto was an Italian film production developed by two Rome-based film companies: Five Film and Fono Roma. Interiors in the film were shot a Incir-De Paolis Studios in Rome and partially on-location Villa Parisi in Frascati.

Comedy duo Franco and Ciccio were enormously popular in Italy, but outside Italy and Spain, they were relatively unknown. The duo performed in variety shows and theatre in Sicily before having small roles in the films Mario Mattoli's Appuntamento a Ischia (1960) and Vittorio De Sica's The Last Judgment (1961). In 1962, director Lucio Fulci directed I due della legione (1962), his first film starring the Franco and Ciccio. This led to a string of 13 films Fulci would direct featuring with the comedy duo. Il Lungo, il corto, il gatto was the last of the collaborations between director Fulci and Franco and Ciccio.

== Release ==
Il Lungo, il corto, il gatto was distributed in Italy by Rank Film with a 90 minute running time. It was released in Bari on May 5, 1967, followed by screenings in Rome on May 20 and Turin on June 3, 1967.

== See also ==
- List of Italian films of 1967
