= How to Rob the Bank of Italy =

1966 film directed by Lucio Fulci

- Directed by: Lucio Fulci
- Screenplay by: Roberto Gianviti; Lucio Fulci; Amedeo Sollazzo
- Story by: Alfonso Brescia
- Produced by: Piero Ghione
- Starring: Franco Franchi; Ciccio Ingrassia; Mario Pisu
- Cinematography: Fausto Ross
- Edited by: Nella Nanuzzi
- Music by: Lallo Gori
- Production companies: Anteos Film; Fono Roma
- Release date: March 20, 1966 (Palermo)
- Running time: 100 minutes
- Country: Italy
- Language: Italian

How to Rob the Bank of Italy (Italian: Come svaligiammo la Banca d'Italia) is a 1966 Italian comedy film directed and co-written by Lucio Fulci, and starring the comic duo Franco and Ciccio.

== Plot ==
Franco and Ciccio are the brothers of Paolo "The Master", a major criminal plotting to rob the Bank of Italy. The two stupid thieves steal Paolo's plane and join forces with another group of inexperienced thieves in a scheme to rob the Bank themselves, before Paolo's gang can pull off the theft.

== Cast ==
- Franco Franchi as Franco
- Ciccio Ingrassia as Ciccio
- Mario Pisu as Paolo the "Master"
- Fiorenzo Fiorentini as Romoletto
- Mirko Ellis as Mirko
- Solvi Stubing as Selma
- Alfredo Adami as Geremia
- Umberto D'Orsi asInspector
- Luisa Rispoli as Paolo's Girlfriend
- Carlo Taranto as Pasquale Aniello
- Ignazio Leone as False Inspector
- Enzo Andronico as Man with nervous tic
- Ursula Janis as blonde girl at the guitar
- Kitty Swan as brunette girl at nightclub

== Production ==
How to Rob the Bank of Italy was a co-production between to Rome-based film companies: Anteos Film and Fono Roma.

The film was director Lucio Fulci's second film shot in color. The film's heist is modeled after Marco Vicario's film Seven Golden Men (1965).

== Release ==
How to Rob the Bank of Italy was released in Italy with a 100-minute running time as Come svaligiammo la Banca d'Italia (lit. 'How We Robbed the Bank of Italy'). It was first released in Palermo on March 20, 1966 followed by screenings in Rome on March 26 and Turin on March 30 and Bari on April 7.

It was later released to television as How to Rob the Bank of Italy in Canada and the United States on November 1, 1967 and October 13, 1968.

== Reception ==
Stephen Thrower, in his book Beyond Terror: The Films of Lucio Fulci (2018) said that there was a "sense of fatigue" creeping into the comedy, with the only surprise being Franco and Ciccio dressing up as comic strip styled superheroes predating the bigger trends of Italian films based on characters from comics like Kriminal and Diabolik.
