= Giuliana Attenni =

Italian film editor

- Occupation: Film editor

Giuliana Attenni was an Italian film editor. She worked on dozens of films between 1947 and 1973, and frequently worked with directors like Mariano Laurenti, Mario Mattoli, and Stefano Vanzina.

== Selected filmography ==
- Il figlioccio del padrino (1973)
- Ubalda, All Naked and Warm (1972)
- Naughty Nun (1972)
- I due assi del guantone (1971)
- Ma che musica maestro (1971)
- I due maghi del pallone (1970)
- Have a Good Funeral, My Friend... Sartana Will Pay (1970)
- Satiricosissimo (1970)
- Zingara (1969)
- The Nephews of Zorro (1968)
- I barbieri di Sicilia (1967)
- I due sanculotti (1966)
- Love Italian Style (1966)
- Two Sons of Ringo (1966)
- Il vostro super agente Flit (1966)
- The Great Leaders (1965)
- Letti sbagliati (1965)
- Saul and David (1964)
- A Monster and a Half (1964)
- Heroes of the West (1964)
- The Four Musketeers (1963)
- The Mystery of the Indian Temple (1963)
- Kali Yug: Goddess of Vengeance (1963)
- Toto vs. the Four (1963)
- The Two Colonels (1963)
- The Four Monks (1962)
- Lo smemorato di Collegno (1962)
- Psycosissimo (1962)
- Totò Diabolicus (1962)
- Seduction of the South (1961)
- Some Like It Cold (1961)
- ...And Suddenly It's Murder! (1960)
- Run with the Devil (1960)
- Letto a tre piazze (1960)
- Toto in Madrid (1959)
- First Love (1959)
- Toto in the Moon (1958)
- Susanna Whipped Cream (1957)
- Nero's Weekend (1956)
- The Awakening (1956)
- The Letters Page (1955)
- Submarine Attack (1955)
- Chéri-Bibi (1955)
- Sins of Casanova (1955)
- An American in Rome (1954)
- A Day in Court (1954)
- Modern Virgin (1954)
- Vestire gli ignudi (1954)
- Siamo tutti inquilini (1953)
- Brothers of Italy (1952)
- Toto the Third Man (1951)
- Accidents to the Taxes!! (1951)
- Arrivano i nostri (1951)
- The Steamship Owner (1951)
- 47 morto che parla (1950)
- Toto the Sheik (1950)
- The Cadets of Gascony (1950)
- Side Street Story (1950)
- The Elusive Twelve (1950)
- The Merry Widower (1950)
- Signorinella (1949)
- Adam and Eve (1949)
- The Firemen of Viggiu (1949)
- Toto Tours Italy (1948)
- Fear and Sand (1948)
- Flesh Will Surrender (1947)
- Rome, Free City (1946)
