= Il clan dei due Borsalini =

- Directed by: Giuseppe Orlandini
- Written by: Roberto Gianviti; Giuseppe Orlandini
- Produced by: Antheo Cinematografica
- Starring: Franco Franchi; Ciccio Ingrassia
- Cinematography: Angelo Lotti
- Music by: Lallo Gori
- Release date: 1971
- Country: Italy
- Language: Italian

Il clan dei due Borsalini (Italian for "The clan of the two Borsalinos") is a 1971 comedy film directed by Giuseppe Orlandini and starring the comic duo Franco and Ciccio.

== Cast ==
- Franco Franchi as Franco Franchetti, aka 'The Professor'
- Ciccio Ingrassia as Professor Francesco Ingrassini
- Isabella Biagini as The Ghost
- Lino Banfi as Ferdi
- Gabriella Giorgelli as Bruna la Svelta
- Adriana Giuffrè as The Math Teacher
- Evi Farinelli as Professor Evi Rossi
- Renato Malavasi as Don Ascanio
- Franca Haas as The Servant
- Ignazio Leone as Gino
- Flora Carosello as Franco's Wife
- Enzo Andronico as Member of the Gang
- Umberto D'Orsi as Inspector
- Luca Sportelli as School Janitor
- Vincenzo Loglisi as Giulio
