= Satiricosissimo =

- Directed by: Mariano Laurenti
- Written by: Roberto Gianviti; Dino Verde
- Produced by: Vittorio Martino; Leo Cevenini
- Starring: Franco Franchi; Ciccio Ingrassia; Edwige Fenech
- Cinematography: Tino Santoni
- Edited by: Giuliana Attenni
- Music by: Carlo Rustichelli
- Distributed by: Variety Distribution
- Release date: 1970
- Running time: 89 minutes
- Country: Italy
- Language: Italian

Satiricosissimo is a 1970 Italian comedy film directed by Mariano Laurenti starring the comic duo Franco and Ciccio. It is a parody of the 1969 Federico Fellini film Fellini Satyricon.

== Plot summary ==
Ciccio loves very much the novel Satyricon of Petronius Arbiter, although his friend Franco does not understand him. Ciccio also saw the famous Federico Fellini's film about the novel, and he goes with Franco in a country inn, near Rome. The director, seeing the success of the film by Fellini, does furnish the inn in the fashion of ancient Rome. Even the guests and the waiters are dressed to the ancient, and so do Franco and Ciccio, but they break a jar of wine and are hunted. The two fall asleep in a clearing, and wake up in the Rome of the Emperor Nero.

Franco and Ciccio risk being killed, and so they're saved just by writer Petronius who hire them as servants. Petronius is the best adviser to Nero, who is scared because he believes that his mother Agrippina wants to kill him. Franco and Ciccio therefore must watch over the life of the emperor, but they soon discover that the killer who wants to murder Nero is not the mother.

== Cast ==
- Franco Franchi as Franco
- Ciccio Ingrassia as Ciccio
- Edwige Fenech as Poppaea Sabina
- Giancarlo Badessi as Nero
- Arturo Dominici as Tigellinus
- Karin Schubert as Acte
- Pino Ferrara as Petronius
- Linda Sini as Agrippina the Younger
- Leonardo Severini as Seneca
- Gigi Reder as The Innkeeper
- Ignazio Leone as The Judge
- Samson Burke as Taurus

== Reception ==
An Italian review of the time finds it is "a sloppy film, whose elementary comic quality relies on double entendres, vulgar jokes, references to recent political events and above all on the crude resources of the two characters in the domain of mime.''
