= Don Chisciotte and Sancio Panza =

- Directed by: Giovanni Grimaldi
- Written by: Giovanni Grimaldi
- Story by: Miguel de Cervantes
- Produced by: Gino Mordini
- Starring: Franco Franchi; Ciccio Ingrassia
- Cinematography: Mario Capriotti
- Music by: Lallo Gori
- Release date: 1968
- Country: Italy
- Language: Italian

Don Chisciotte and Sancio Panza (Italian: Don Chisciotte e Sancio Panza) is an Italian 1968 comedy film written and directed by Giovanni Grimaldi and starring the comic duo Franco and Ciccio. It is based on the Miguel de Cervantes' novel Don Quixote.

== Plot ==
In the original novel, Sancio Panza was a farmer who followed Don Chisciotte in his adventures because of a certain attraction. Sancho Panza imagines to make money from his companies and prefer to go around the world. In the novel, other characters appear as extras such as the baker who represents the daily life of that time.

== Cast ==
- Ciccio Ingrassia as Don Chisciotte
- Franco Franchi as Sancio Panza
- Fulvia Franco as Duchess
- Paolo Carlini as Don José
- Umberto D'Orsi as Don Pietro
- Enzo Garinei as Adviser to the Governor
- Franco Fantasia as Fencing Master
- Aldo Bufi Landi as Don Pedro de Cordova
- Alfredo Rizzo as Governor's Doctor
- Mimmo Poli as Tavern Customer
- Carlo Delle Piane as Whipped Boy
- Franco Giacobini as Don Nicola
- Livio Lorenzon as The Thief
- Poldo Bendandi as Innkeeper
- Luca Sportelli as Second Innkeeper
- Lino Banfi as Tavern Customer

== See also ==
- List of Italian films of 1968
