= I due assi del guantone =

- Film poster
- Directed by: Mariano Laurenti
- Written by: Dino Verde; Roberto Gianviti
- Produced by: Leo Cevenini; Vittorio Martino
- Starring: Franco Franchi; Ciccio Ingrassia
- Cinematography: Tino Santoni
- Music by: Piero Umiliani
- Production companies: Flora Film; National Cinematografica
- Distributed by: Variety Distribution
- Release date: December 2, 1971
- Running time: 97 minutes
- Country: Italy
- Language: Italian

I due assi del guantone (Italian for "The two aces of boxing") is a 1971 comedy film directed by Mariano Laurenti and starring the comic duo Franco and Ciccio.

== Plot ==
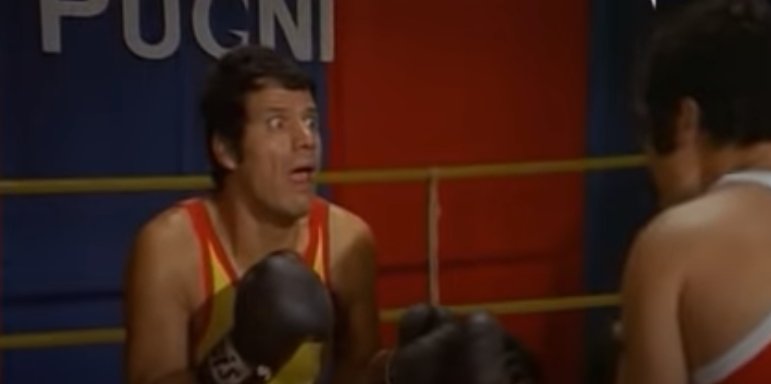
Franco Franchi in the film.

Franco and Ciccio are two Sicilians who seek fortune in Rome. They are hired as kitchen boys in the restaurant of Amleto Rossetti, who happens to be a passionate boxing fan. In order to take advantage of the latter's wealth, Franco pretends to be a boxing champion.

== Cast ==
- Franco Franchi as Franco Marsala
- Ciccio Ingrassia as Ciccio Trapani
- Mario Carotenuto as Amleto Rossetti
- Ave Ninchi as Adele Rossetti
- Gino Milli as Enzo
- Paola Tedesco as Marisa
- Umberto D'Orsi as Sor Giovanni
- Giulio Rinaldi as Cesare De Cesari a.k.a. "Golia"
- Tiberio Murgia as The Traffic Cop
- Luca Sportelli as The Grocer
- Enzo Andronico as The Boxing Coach
- Nino Vingelli as A Restaurateur
- Ada Pometti as The Chemist
- Fulvio Mingozzi as The Tour Guide

== Reception ==
An Italian review of the time finds the film 'poor in ideas, carelessly directed and relying merely on the repertoire of jokes and funny faces of the comic duet'.

== See also ==
- List of Italian films of 1971
