= Don Franco e Don Ciccio nell'anno della contestazione =

- Directed by: Marino Girolami
- Written by: Marino Girolami; Amedeo Sollazzo
- Produced by: Edmondo Amati
- Starring: Franco Franchi; Ciccio Ingrassia
- Cinematography: Mario Fioretti
- Edited by: Vincenzo Tomassi
- Music by: Piero Umiliani
- Release date: 1970
- Running time: 94 minutes
- Country: Italy
- Language: Italian

Don Franco e Don Ciccio nell'anno della contestazione (Don Franco and Don Ciccio in the year of protest) is a 1970 Italian comedy film written and directed by Marino Girolami starring the comic duo Franco and Ciccio.

== Plot summary ==
Don Franco and Don Ciccio are the respective pastors of the two principal parishes of a village in Sicily. The two have different ideals about society, and so they always fight by way: Don Franco is a priest more open to the social level, which supports the protests of the young communists, while Don Ciccio is a severe priest of the old school, who speaks in Latin and who hates communists protesters. One day the two bitterly quarrel over a disputed land of the city: Don Franco would create there a public park, with the support of the communists, while Don Ciccio would fain give it to the municipality for other interests. So the two fathers decide to settle the matter with a game of football.

== Cast ==
- Franco Franchi: Don Franco
- Ciccio Ingrassia: Don Ciccio
- Edwige Fenech: Anna Bellinzoni
- Enio Girolami: Tenente dei Carabinieri
- Umberto D'Orsi: Orazio Caccamo
- Yvonne Sanson: Donna Camilla
- Lino Banfi: Cosimino
- Luca Sportelli: Maresciallo dei Carabinieri
- Enzo Andronico: Don Mimì Nicastro
- Renato Malavasi: Cavaliere Giacomo Bellinzoni
- Alfredo Rizzo: Veterinario
- Giampiero Littera: Carabiniere Derlin

== See also ==
- List of Italian films of 1970
