= Riccardo Pazzaglia =

Italian actor, director, screenwriter, songwriter, TV and radio personality

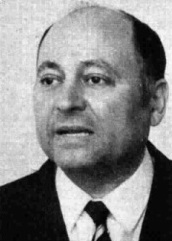
- Born: 12 September 1926; Naples, Italy
- Died: 4 October 2006 (aged 80); Rome, Italy
- Occupations: Director; Screenwriter
- Height: 1.73 m (5 ft 8 in)

Riccardo Pazzaglia (12 September 1926 – 4 October 2006) was an Italian actor, film director, screenwriter, songwriter (for Domenico Modugno), TV and radio personality.

Born in Naples, Pazzaglia graduated in direction from the Centro Sperimentale di Cinematografia in Rome. He entered the film industry as an assistant director and screenwriter, specializing in adventure and comedy films. Pazzaglia made his directional debut with L'onorata società, starring the comedy duo Franco and Ciccio, whom he also directed in Farfallon. After some years of hiatus, Pazzaglia got a personal success thanks to his participation to the Renzo Arbore's variety show Quelli della notte. He later reprised his film activities, collaborating to the screenplays of some films by Luciano De Crescenzo and writing, directing and also starring in his last film, Separati in casa.
