= Luca Sportelli =

Italian actor

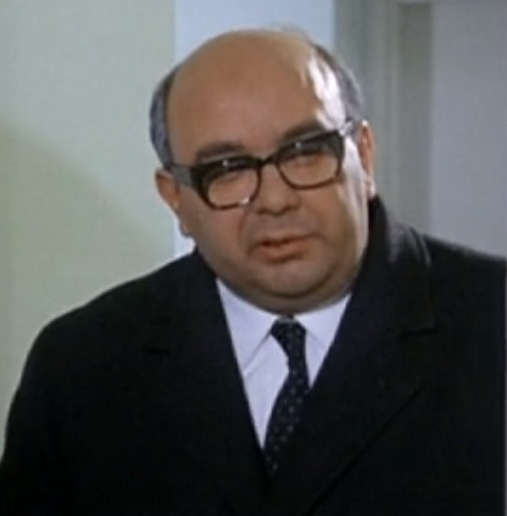
- Luca Sportelli as cavalier Mazzabotti in Gli infermieri della mutua (1969)
- Born: 11 March 1927; Bari, Italy
- Died: 29 August 1999 (aged 72); Rome, Italy
- Occupation: Actor
- Years active: 1964-1991

Luca Sportelli (11 March 1927 – 29 August 1999) was an Italian actor who appeared in more than one hundred films from 1964 to 1991.

== Selected filmography ==
| Year | Title | Role | Notes |
|---|---|---|---|
| 1981 | La dottoressa preferisce i marinai | | |
| 1980 | Fico d'India | | |
| 1979 | The Finzi Detective Agency | | |
| 1979 | La patata bollente | | |
| 1977 | Messalina, Messalina | | |
| 1976 | Basta che non si sappia in giro | | |
| 1976 | My Sister in Law | | |
| 1974 | Piedino il questurino | | |
| 1974 | A forza di sberle | | |
| 1972 | Il coltello di ghiaccio | | |
| 1972 | I due gattoni a nove code... e mezza ad Amsterdam | | |
| 1972 | Boccaccio | | |
| 1971 | I due assi del guantone | | |
| 1971 | Il clan dei due Borsalini | | |
| 1971 | Ma che musica maestro | | |
| 1970 | Mezzanotte d'amore | | |
| 1970 | Splendori e miserie di Madame Royale | | |
| 1970 | I due maghi del pallone | | |
| 1970 | Don Franco e Don Ciccio nell'anno della contestazione | | |
| 1969 | Pensiero d'amore | | |
| 1969 | I See Naked | | |
| 1968 | I 2 deputati | | |
| 1968 | Don Chisciotte and Sancio Panza | | |
| 1968 | Ciccio Forgives, I Don't | | |
| 1968 | The Longest Hunt | | |
| 1965 | Con rispetto parlando | | |
