= I due gattoni a nove code... e mezza ad Amsterdam =

- Directed by: Osvaldo Civirani
- Written by: Osvaldo Civirani
- Starring: Franco Franchi; Ciccio Ingrassia
- Cinematography: Walter Civirani
- Music by: Ubaldo Continiello
- Release date: 1972
- Country: Italy
- Language: Italian

I due gattoni a nove code... e mezza ad Amsterdam (Italian for "The two cats o' nine tails ... and a half in Amsterdam") is a 1972 Italian comedy film written and directed by Osvaldo Civirani (here credited as Richard Kean) starring the comic duo Franco and Ciccio. The title spoofs the Dario Argento's giallo The Cat o' Nine Tails (Il gatto a nove code in Italian).

== Plot ==
The journalist Ciccio and the photographer Franco are looking for a scoop, as they stumble by chance in the murder of a Dutch diamond dealer of which Franco immortalizes the fateful moment. Thanks to this event the couple get an engagement and a transfer to Amsterdam to investigate the murder.

== Cast ==
- Franco Franchi: Franco
- Ciccio Ingrassia: Ciccio
- Eliìzabeth Turner: Thea
- Enzo Andronico: Berger
- Luigi Bonos: Bing Bong
- Luciano Pigozzi: Killer
- Umberto D'Orsi: Policeman
- Luca Sportelli : Interpol Agent
