= Franco and Ciccio =

Italian comic comedy duo active from 1954 to 1992

- Franco e Ciccio (Italian)
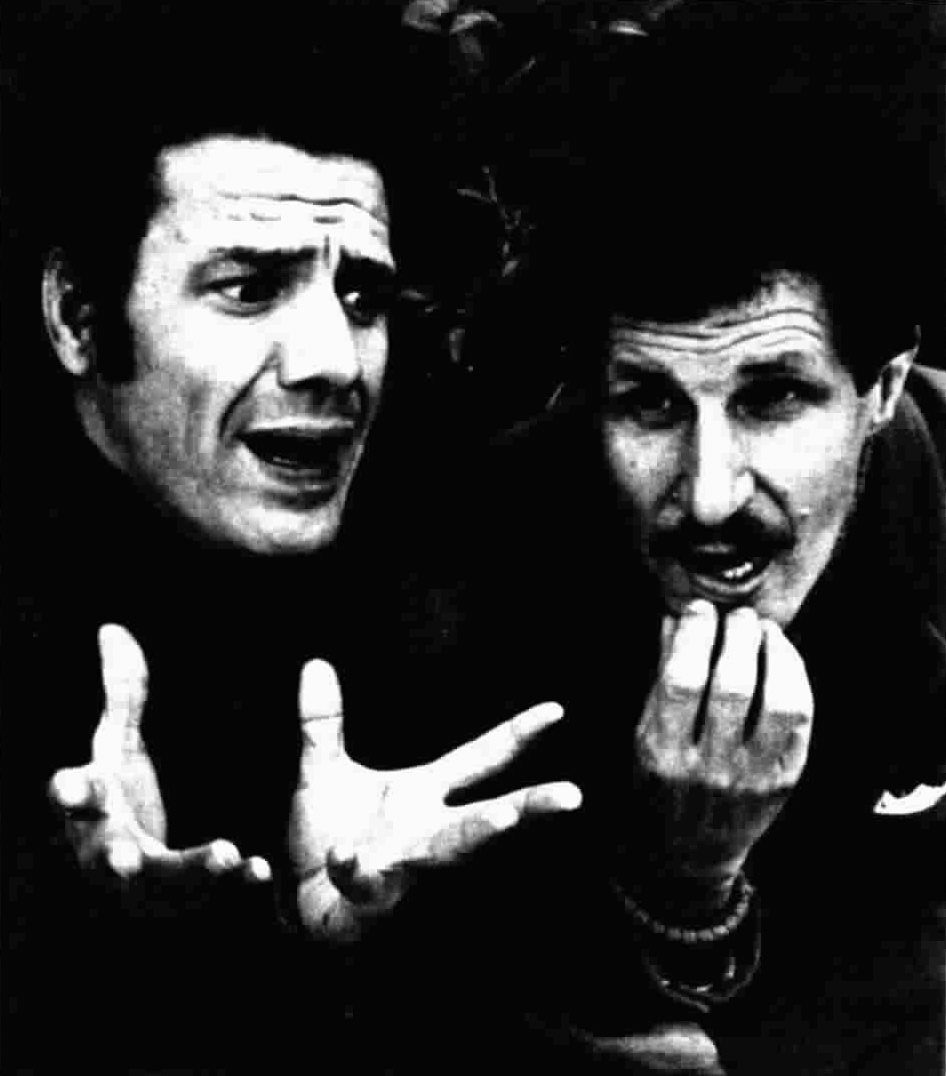
- Franco Franchi (left) and Ciccio Ingrassia (right)

Comedy career
- Years active: 1954–1992
- Medium: Film, television, theater, albums, radio
- Genre: Comedy

Franco and Ciccio (Italian: Franco e Ciccio, pronounced [ˈfraŋko e tˈtʃittʃo]) were a comic comedy duo formed by Italian actors Franco Franchi (1928–1992) and Ciccio Ingrassia (1922–2003), particularly popular in the 1960s and 1970s. Their collaboration began in 1954 in the theatre field, and ended with Franchi's death in 1992. The two made their cinema debuts in 1960 with the film Appuntamento a Ischia. They remained active until 1984 when their last film together, Kaos, was shot, although there were some interruptions in 1973 and from 1975 to 1980.

Together, they appeared in 112 films. Considered at the time as protagonists of B movies, they were subsequently reevaluated by critics for their comedy and creative abilities, becoming the subject of study. The huge success with the public is evidenced by the box office earnings, which in the 1960s represented 10% of the annual box office earnings in Italy.

== History ==
Both born in Palermo, Sicily, their collaboration began in 1954 in the theatre field, and ended with Franchi's death in 1992. The two made their cinema debuts in 1960 with the film Appuntamento a Ischia. They remained active until 1984 when their last film together, Kaos, was shot, although there were some interruptions in 1973 and from 1975 to 1980.

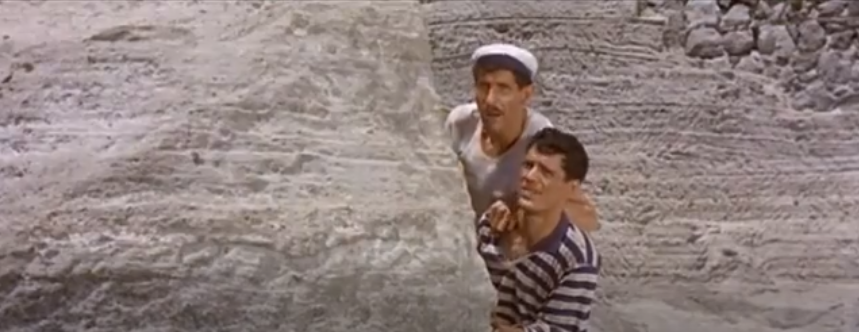
Franco and Ciccio in Appuntamento a Ischia by Mario Mattoli (1960)

Together, they appeared in 112 films, usually as the main characters, and occasionally as supporting characters in films featuring well-known actors such as Totò and Domenico Modugno who wrote "Rinaldo in campo" for the two; the theatre piece launched the comedy team's career. They also appeared in a variety of film genres and appeared opposite Vittorio Gassman, Buster Keaton and Vincent Price.

Although their films were labelled as minor works of Italian cinema by film critics of the time, who did not consider their comic films as they were often parodies of films of the period. However, they were rewarded by important audience responses, for example I figli del leopardo by Sergio Corbucci (1965), a parody of The Leopard by Luchino Visconti (1963). However, there were exceptions to the negative judgments of critics such as those of Alberto Moravia and Carmelo Bene who admitted to appreciating their work.

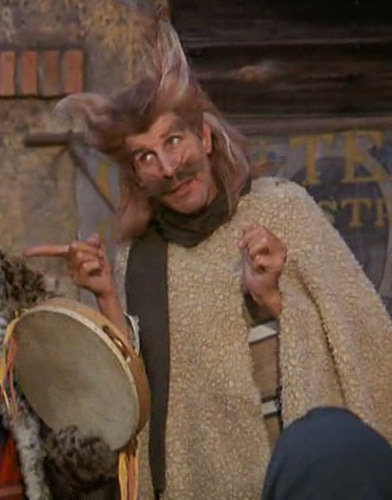
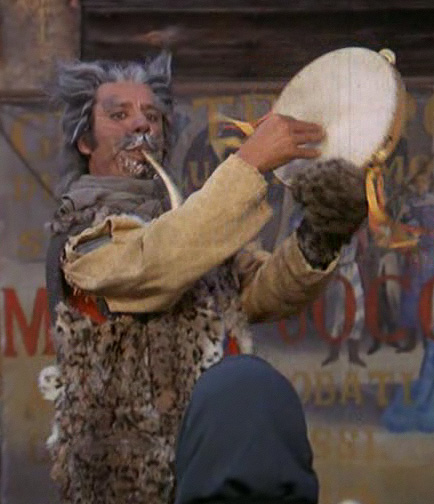
Ciccio (left) as the Fox and Franco (right) as the Cat in the TV series The Adventures of Pinocchio by Luigi Comencini (1972)

They acted in films certainly made in a short time and with few means, such as those shot with the director Marcello Ciorciolini, sometimes even making a dozen films in a year, often without a real script and where they often improvised on the set. Also are the 13 films directed by Lucio Fulci, who was the architect of the reversal of their typical roles by making Ciccio the serious one, the sidekick, and Franco the comic one.

Considered at the time as protagonists of B movie, they were subsequently reevaluated by critics for their comedy and creative abilities, becoming the object of study. The huge success with the public is evidenced by the box office earnings, which in the 1960s, represented 10% of the annual earnings in Italy.

== Movie plots ==
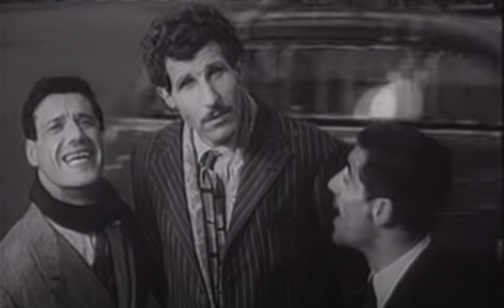
Franco and Ciccio in L'onorata società by Riccardo Pazzaglia (1961)

Often their films were without a real screenplay and were based on a canovaccio and the dialogues were entrusted to improvisation. The director, more often than not, limited himself to giving indications to those in charge of the movie camera, without interfering in the work of the actors. Franco defines it as a "superficial artistic direction, daughter of a passive conception of cinema".

Two types of films can be identified in the duo's filmography, parodies and original works, stories entirely invented by them or by the screenwriters. In between these two are original films with parodied titles, and anthology films. Furthermore, the participations in auteur films such as The Last Judgment by Vittorio De Sica (1961) or Kaos by Paolo and Vittorio Taviani (1984), Caprice Italian Style (1968) by six different directors and The Adventures of Pinocchio by Luigi Comencini (1972) are very important.

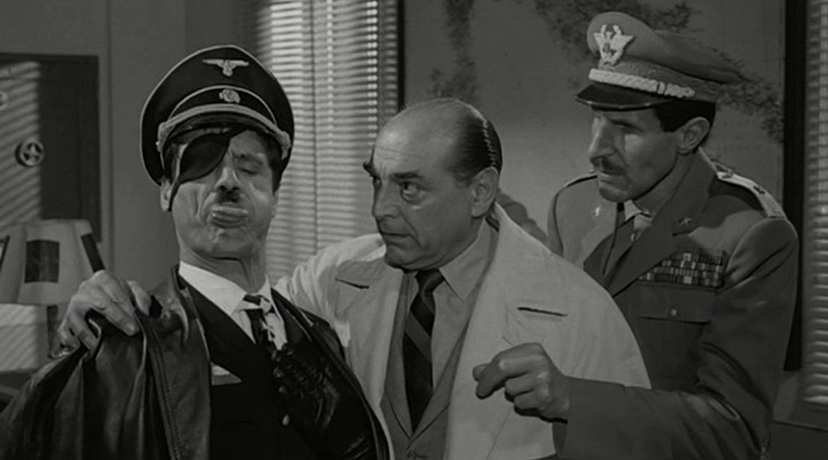
Franco and Ciccio in I due pericoli pubblici by Lucio Fulci (1964)

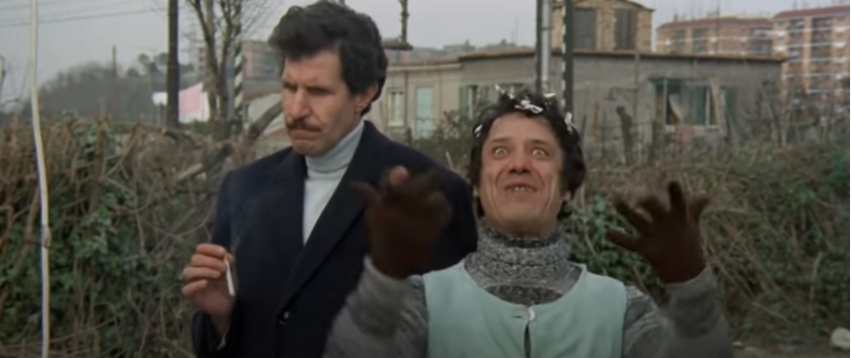
Franco and Ciccio in Continuavano a chiamarli... er più e er meno by Giuseppe Orlandini (1972)

Movies with an original plot represent the majority and are of multiple genres, which usually followed the trend of the fashion and market needs of the period in which they were made. Many films are centered on the theme of the Sicilian Mafia, initially playing on the mafioso stereotype such as L'onorata società by Riccardo Pazzaglia (1961) and I due mafiosi by Giorgio Simonelli (1964).

Others focus on the humorous satire of society by targeting politics (I 2 deputati by Giovanni Grimaldi, 1968), religion (Don Franco e Don Ciccio nell'anno della contestazione by Marino Girolami, 1970), sport (I due maghi del pallone by Mariano Laurenti, 1970), justice (Riuscirà l'avvocato Franco Benenato a sconfiggere il suo acerrimo nemico il pretore Ciccio De Ingras? by Mino Guerrini, 1971). In the western genre include, Two Sergeants of General Custer by Giorgio Simonelli (1965), How We Got into Trouble with the Army by Lucio Fulci (1965), How We Robbed the Bank of Italy by Lucio Fulci (1966), How We Stole the Atomic Bomb by Lucio Fulci (1967), I 2 pompieri, I due assi del guantone by Mariano Laurenti (1971), and Franco, Ciccio e le vedove allegre.

Often, minor film houses, as soon as they had news of the release of a new film, commissioned a parody even based on the title alone, leading to films such as Satiricosissimo, I figli del leopardo, I due pericoli pubblici; then the parodies of the Spaghetti Western (Per un pugno nell'occhio, The Handsome, the Ugly, and the Stupid, Due rrringos nel Texas) and those of espionage (Dr. Goldfoot and the Girl Bombs, 002 agenti segretissimi, 002 Operazione Luna) which refer to the James Bond saga. Other parodies were Don Chisciotte and Sancio Panza and Farfallon.

Halfway between parodies and original works, there are also films with titles that refer to famous titles but with original plots such as I due maggiolini più matti del mondo (1970). Separately, anthology films, which were made above all because they took much less time to make and because they could stage more leading actors and therefore attract more audiences. The sections La giara in Kaos (1984) and Che cosa sono le nuvole? in Caprice Italian Style (1968) are examples.

== Cultural impact ==
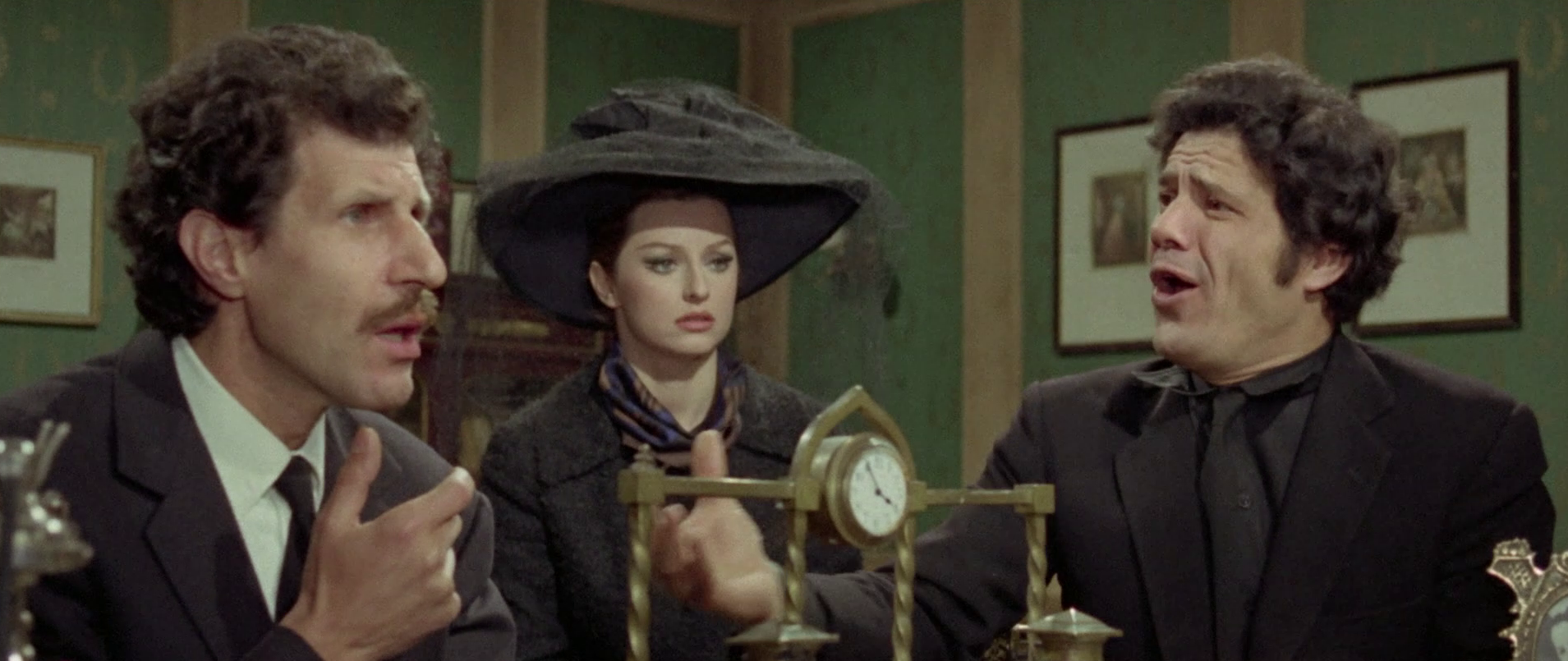
Franco and Ciccio in Il lungo, il corto, il gatto by Lucio Fulci (1967)

The duo also starred in a comic series at the end of the 1960s, Ciccio & Franco, with stories that were original, but featured gags already established in the cinema. On 8 September 2004, during the 61st Venice International Film Festival, Daniele Ciprì and Franco Maresco presented the documentary film Come inguaiammo il cinema italiano - La vera storia di Franco e Ciccio (English: "How we messed up Italian cinema - The true story of Franco and Ciccio"), on the life of Franco and Ciccio. Despite the problems encountered, the two directors collected a large amount of material, also reconstructing the sketches of the street debuts of the two comedians from Palermo, collecting testimonies and interviews.

== Inspirations ==
The main model of the duo remains that of Laurel & Hardy. As a young man, Ciccio's idol was Totò. He went to see him during a show in Palermo and was impressed by him, so much so that he took many ideas from his work and recreated them in his characters, especially in the initial period of the theater. He also greatly admired Danny Kaye and Charlie Chaplin.

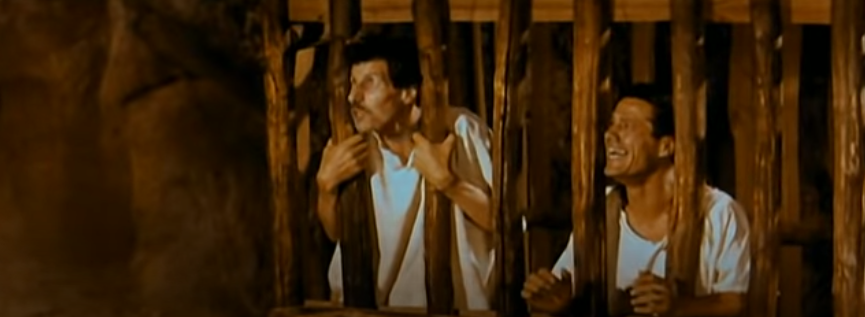
Franco and Ciccio in Hercules in the Valley of Woe by Mario Mattoli (1961)

Franco instead admired Buster Keaton, who he considered even better than Chaplin. His dream was to act alongside him, and did so in 1966. In the early years of theatre, Franco was often compared to Jerry Lewis.

Franco and Ciccio also admired many of their contemporary colleagues: Peppino De Filippo, Erminio Macario, Raimondo Vianello, Luigi Pavese, Aldo Fabrizi, Akim Tamiroff and Misha Auer. Furthermore, Ciccio had been positively impressed by Jayne Mansfield, an actress who died at the age of 34 in a car accident, with whom he starred in Primitive Love by Luigi Scattini (1964).

== Acknowledgments ==
=== Telegatti ===
- Telegatti 1984 for the Bene, bravo, bis TV show.

=== Dedications ===
- Exhibition Franco and Ciccio... not only comedians!!!, organized by the Sicilian branch of the Experimental Cinematography Center dedicated to the duo in Palermo from 4 to 6 June 2012.
- The theatre hall of the Piccola Accademia dei Talenti in Palermo was named after the duo on 10 December 2017.
- Piazzetta Franco and Ciccio in Palermo and, close to via Venezia, a plaque in memory of the two actors.
- Show Ciccio the other half of Franco, organized in Palermo on the occasion of the 15th anniversary of Ingrassia's death.

== Music ==
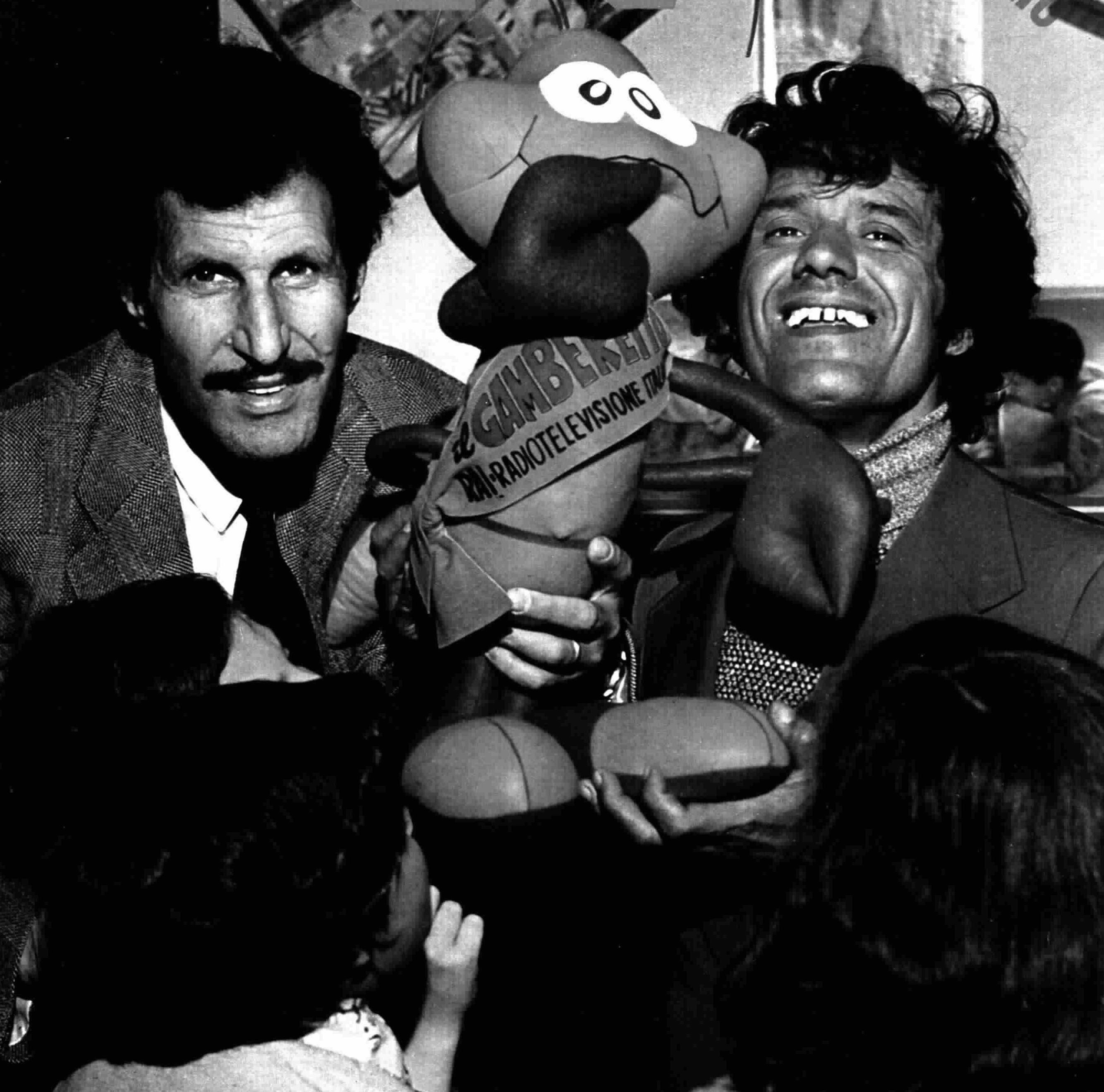
Franco and Ciccio

Franco, while working with Salvatore Polara's "crawlers", as well as acting, played the bass drum and the accordion and sang in the shows in the square. Ciccio, on the other hand, initially devoted himself to parodies of Canzone Napoletana, including Agata, Nino Taranto's forte. The first show together was dedicated to the Neapolitan song Core 'ngrato. They collaborated with Domenico Modugno in the LP recording of the show Rinaldo in campo, which collected all the songs interpreted during the comedy; the song “Tre briganti, tre somari” was then also published in 45 rpm.

Singles were also made from their television appearances. The best success fell to Franco who alone released the album Sarò Franco and various singles (of which “L'ultimo dei belli” ended up in the hit parade). Even during their television conductions in the 1980s they signed several closing theme songs for their respective programs, including the one created for Drim entitled “E mi pareva strano”. In the same period he covered a 1981 hit entitled “Shaddap your face” and recorded by Joe Dolce, called “Alì Alì Alè”.

=== Albums ===
- 1961 – Rinaldo in campo (Fonit Cetra, LP 20016; participation with Domenico Modugno, Delia Scala and the rest of the cast of the homonymous theatrical show)

=== Singles ===
- 1961 – "Tre somari e tre briganti/La bandiera" (Carosello Records)
- 1966 – "Bang... bang... kissenè/Il re dello scasso" (Ester Records, GEE 104)
- 1968 – "Ciccio perdona... io no!/Lupara Story" (Carosello Records, Cl-20211)
- 1968 – "La gavotta" (Carosello Records)
- 1968 – "Tango mizzichero/Scuola di danza" (Carosello Records, Cl-20207)
- 1969 – "Non siamo eroi/Non siamo eroi (instrumental)" (Carosello Records, Cl-20223)
- 1970 – "Cerentoluzzo parte 1/Cerentoluzzo parte 2" (Hello Records, HR 9037)
- 1970 – "La lampada di Alaciccio parte 1/La lampada di Alaciccio parte 2" (Hello Records, HR 9038)
- 1970 – "Pollifranco e Polliciccio parte 1/Pollifranco e Polliciccio parte 2" (Hello Records, HR 9039)
- 1981 – "E mi pareva strano/Franco, Ciccio e il pappagallo" (Fonit Cetra, SP-1749)
- 1982 – "Ah, l'amore/Alì Alì Alè" (RCA Italiana, BB 6559)
- 1982 – "Ridiamoci sopra/Calcio matto" (RCA Italiana)

== Theater ==
- Core 'ngrato (1954)
- Al Texas Club (1957)
- Due in allegria e cinque in armonia (1958)
- Un giallo più giallo di un giallo (1958)
- Liz Taylor è a Cannes, De Sica a New York, Franchi e Ingrassia a Palermo (1959)
- Rinaldo in campo (1961-62)
- Masaniello (1963)
- Tommaso d'Amalfi (1963-64)
- Il cortile degli Aragonesi (1973)
- La granduchessa e i camerieri (1977)

== Notable films ==
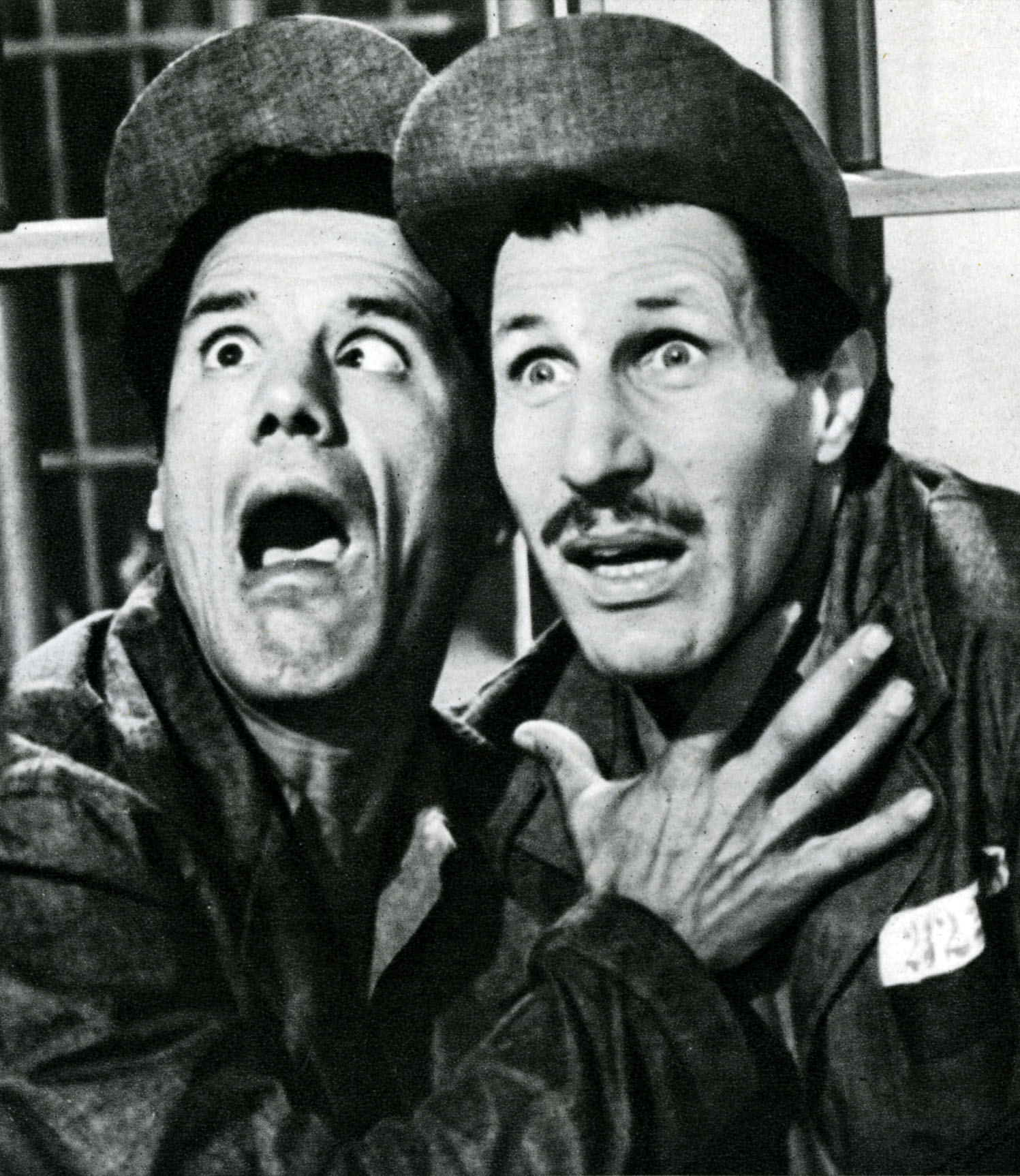
Franco and Ciccio in Two Escape from Sing Sing by Lucio Fulci (1964)

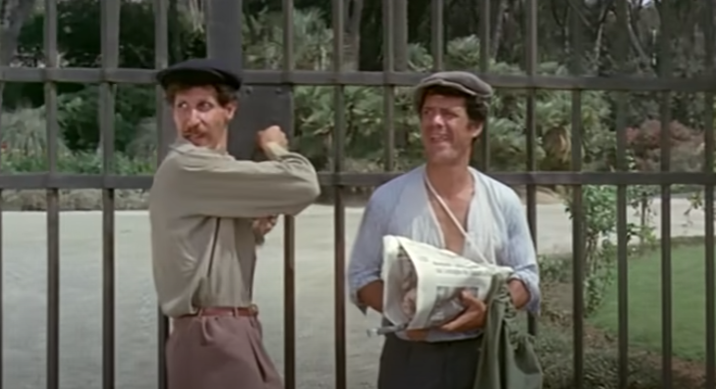
Franco and Ciccio in Oh! Those Most Secret Agents! by Lucio Fulci (1964)

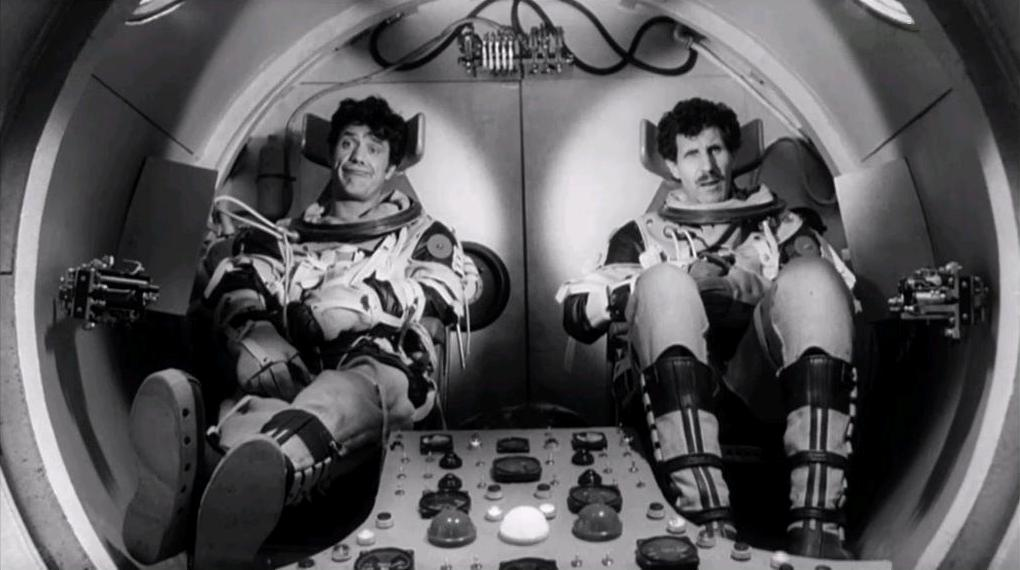
Franco and Ciccio in 002 Operazione Luna by Lucio Fulci (1965)

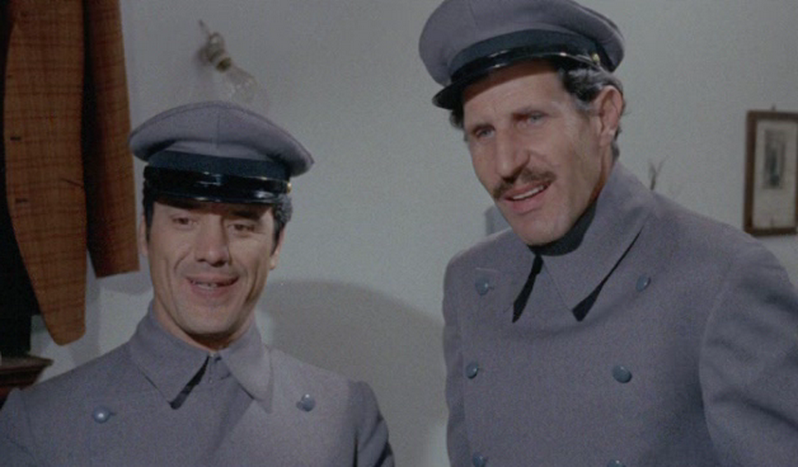
Franco and Ciccio in Nel sole by Aldo Grimaldi (1967)

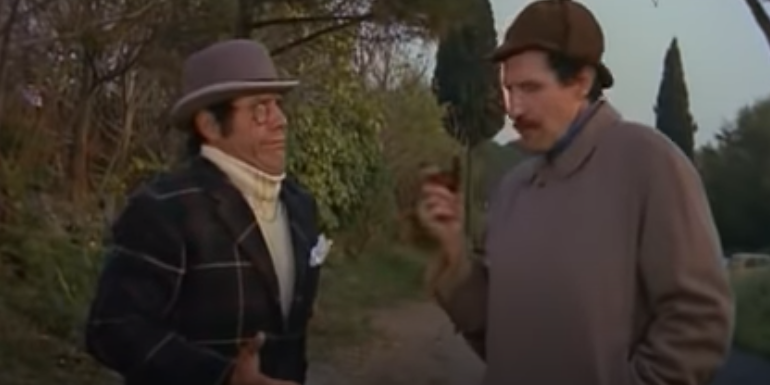
Franco and Ciccio in I due assi del guantone by Mariano Laurenti (1971)

- Appuntamento a Ischia by Mario Mattoli (1960)
- L'onorata società by Riccardo Pazzaglia (1961)
- 5 marines per 100 ragazze by Mario Mattoli (1961)
- Hercules in the Valley of Woe by Mario Mattoli (1961)
- The Last Judgment by Vittorio De Sica (1961)
- Il mio amico Benito by Giorgio Bianchi (1962)
- Those Two in the Legion by Lucio Fulci (1962)
- The Shortest Day by Sergio Corbucci (1962)
- I motorizzati by Camillo Mastrocinque (1962)
- Obiettivo ragazze by Mario Mattoli (1963)
- The Swindlers by Lucio Fulci (1963)
- I due mafiosi by Giorgio Simonelli (1964)
- I due pericoli pubblici by Lucio Fulci (1964)
- Two Escape from Sing Sing by Lucio Fulci (1964)
- Oh! Those Most Secret Agents! by Lucio Fulci (1964)
- Two Mafiamen in the Far West by Giorgio Simonelli (1964)
- Primitive Love by Luigi Scattini (1964)
- Sedotti e bidonati by Giorgio Bianchi (1964)
- A Monster and a Half by Steno (1964)
- Corpse for the Lady by Mario Mattoli (1964)
- I Kill, You Kill by Gianni Puccini (1965)
- Letti sbagliati by Steno (1965)
- Per un pugno nell'occhio by Michele Lupo (1965)
- I figli del leopardo by Sergio Corbucci (1965)
- Latin Lovers (1965 film) by Mario Costa (1965)
- Two Sergeants of General Custer by Giorgio Simonelli (1965)
- Two Mafiosi Against Goldginger by Giorgio Simonelli (1965)
- 002 Operazione Luna by Lucio Fulci (1965)
- The Two Parachutists by Lucio Fulci (1965)
- How We Got into Trouble with the Army by Lucio Fulci (1965)
- I due toreri by Giorgio Simonelli (1965)
- Soldati e caporali by Mario Amendola (1965)
- Veneri al sole by Marino Girolami (1965)
- War Italian Style by Luigi Scattini (1966)
- Two Sons of Ringo by Giorgio Simonelli (1966)
- I due sanculotti by Giorgio Simonelli (1966)
- How We Robbed the Bank of Italy by Lucio Fulci (1966)
- Due mafiosi contro Al Capone by Giorgio Simonelli (1966)
- Dr. Goldfoot and the Girl Bombs by Mario Bava (1966)
- Come rubammo la bomba atomica by Lucio Fulci (1967)
- Nel sole by Aldo Grimaldi (1967)
- Il lungo, il corto, il gatto by Lucio Fulci (1967)
- I barbieri di Sicilia by Marcello Ciorciolini (1967)
- The Handsome, the Ugly, and the Stupid by Giovanni Grimaldi (1967)
- The Two Crusaders by Giuseppe Orlandini (1968)
- Caprice Italian Style, directed by six different directors (1968)
- Don Chisciotte and Sancio Panza by Giovanni Grimaldi (1968)
- The Nephews of Zorro by Marcello Ciorciolini (1968)
- Brutti di notte by Giovanni Grimaldi (1968)
- Ciccio Forgives, I Don't by Marcello Ciorciolini (1968)
- L'oro del mondo by Aldo Grimaldi (1968)
- I 2 deputati by Giovanni Grimaldi (1968)
- Franco, Ciccio e il pirata Barbanera by Mario Amendola (1969)
- Indovina chi viene a merenda? by Marcello Ciorciolini (1969)
- Paths of War by Aldo Grimaldi (1970)
- Satiricosissimo by Mariano Laurenti (1970)
- W le donne by Aldo Grimaldi (1970)
- I due maghi del pallone by Mariano Laurenti (1970)
- Don Franco e Don Ciccio nell'anno della contestazione by Marino Girolami (1970)
- Ma chi t'ha dato la patente? by Nando Cicero (1970)
- Armiamoci e partite! by Nando Cicero (1971)
- Ma che musica maestro by Mariano Laurenti (1971)
- I due assi del guantone by Mariano Laurenti (1971)
- Il clan dei due Borsalini by Giuseppe Orlandini (1971)
- The Adventures of Pinocchio by Luigi Comencini (1972)
- I due gattoni a nove code... e mezza ad Amsterdam by Osvaldo Civirani (1972)
- Two Sons of Trinity by Osvaldo Civirani (1972)
- Il sergente Rompiglioni by Pier Giorgio Ferretti (1973)
- Farfallon by Riccardo Pazzaglia (1974)
- Paolo il freddo by Ciccio Ingrassia (1974)
- Kaos by Paolo and Vittorio Taviani (1984)

== Television ==
=== Presenters ===
- Comiche di un anno n.1 (Programma Nazionale, 1965)
- I due nel sacco (Programma Nazionale, 1966)
- Due ragazzi incorreggibili (Rete 1, 1976-1977)
- Drim (Rete 2, 1980)
- Patatrac (Rete 2, 1981)
- Ridiamoci sopra (Canale 5, 1982)
- 3,2,1... ed è '82 (Rete 2, 1981-1982)
- Beauty Center Show (Italia 1, 1983)
- Bene, bravi, bis (Italia 1, 1984)
- Grand Hotel (Canale 5, 1985-1986)
- Gran galà per Hanna & Barbera (Rai 1, 1989)
- Zecchino d'Oro (Rai 1, 1990)
- La festa della mamma (Rai 1, 1991)
- Avanspettacolo (Rai 3, 1992)

=== Regular guests ===
- Cantatutto (Programma Nazionale, 1963-1964)
- Partitissima (Programma Nazionale, 1967)
- Un disco per l'estate (Programma Nazionale, 1972)
- Calciomatto (Rete 1, 1982; Rai 1, 1983)
- Grand Hotel (Canale 5, 1985-1986)
- Buona Domenica (Canale 5, 1986-1987)
- Il gioco dei 9 (Canale 5, 1990, guests from 5 to 10 September)
- La Banda dello Zecchino (Rai 1, 1991)

=== Television series ===
- La fiaba incantata (1980)
- Farsa (1986)
- Io Jane, tu Tarzan (1989)

== Radio ==
- Il gamberetto (1970–71)
- Gran varietà (1971–72)
- Permette cavallo (1981)
- Il baraccone (1981)

== See also ==
- Cinema of Italy
- Double act

== Bibliography ==
- Castellano, Alberto; Nucci, Vincenzo (1982). Vita e spettacolo di Franco Franchi e Ciccio Ingrassia [Life and entertainment of Franco Franchi and Ciccio Ingrassia] (in Italian). Liguori Editore. ISBN 978-8820711856.
- Bertolino, Marco; Ridola, Ettore (2003). Franco Franchi e Ciccio Ingrassia [Franco Franchi and Ciccio Ingrassia] (in Italian). Gremese. ISBN 88-8440-271-9.
- Giusti, Marco (2004). Continuavano a chiamarli Franco e Ciccio [They kept calling them Franco and Ciccio] (in Italian). Mondadori. ISBN 88-04-53305-6.
