= Piece of the Sky =

1957 film

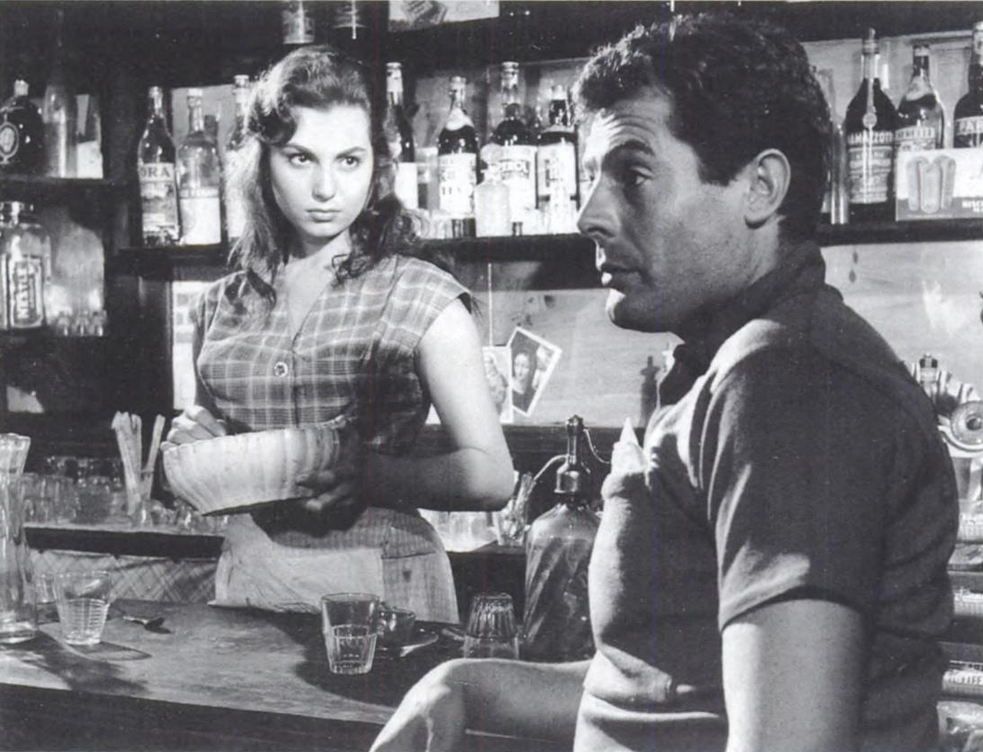
- Schiaffino and Mastroianni in a film scene
- Directed by: Aglauco Casadio
- Written by: Aglauco Casadio; Ennio Flaiano; Tonino Guerra; Elio Petri
- Produced by: Franco Cristaldi
- Starring: Marcello Mastroianni
- Cinematography: Gianni Di Venanzo
- Edited by: Gabriele Varriale
- Music by: Nino Rota
- Release date: 1958
- Running time: 84 minutes
- Country: Italy
- Language: Italian

Piece of the Sky (Italian: Un ettaro di cielo) is a 1958 Italian comedy film directed by Aglauco Casadio.

== Plot ==
Severino Balestra, a peddler who goes around the various village festivals of the Po delta selling trinkets, returns to Migliarino, where three elderly people live who make ends meet with a few barber jobs, or poaching eels. Marina also lives there, the young woman who had an affair with him the previous year and who now works in the village inn.

Severino tells the three naive old unlikely stories about big cities and progress. In the evening, after unsuccessfully trying to spend the night with Marina in the inn, Severino stops by the three elderly people and here proposes them a deal: the sale of pieces of the sky, which will make them rich because they will be able to get the rent paid from the planes. that pass from there. Of course - he tells them - they will only be able to use the property when they are dead.

The three naive elders accept the deal and give him 3,000 lire, all their savings, as an advance. Then they decide to kill themselves in order to immediately take advantage of their investment and try to do it in the only way possible in that area: by drowning in the swamps. But they did not calculate that many areas have now been cleared and when one of the three jumps into the water, it is only a few centimeters deep.

Severino, who had not realized the consequences of his gesture, meanwhile remained in the village to make his scams. He meets Marina again and this time the girl, who is in any case attracted by Severino's cialtronesca sympathy, does not reject him and goes away with him among the reeds.

Here Severino understands the intentions of the three elderly and desperate, believing that they are really committing suicide, he starts looking for them in the swamp. The three meanwhile, after the failed dive into the water, get drunk, but they really run the risk of drowning because the old boat on which they live goes out to sea and sinks. They are rescued by the guards, with whom they have been in conflict for years over poaching.

In the end Severino, happy that nothing has happened, gives back to the elderly the money he had had as an advance of that hectare of sky they wanted to buy and leaves because the village festival is over. Marina leaves with him.

== Cast ==
- Marcello Mastroianni as Severino Balestra
- Rosanna Schiaffino as Marina
- Carlo Pisacane
- Silvio Bagolini
- Luigi De Martino
- Salvatore Cafiero
- Polidor as Pedretti
- Ignazio Leone as Riccardo
- Nino Vingelli as Impresario
- Nicola Bongiorno
- Marina De Giorgio as Mary II
- Franca Droghetti
- Lia Ferrel as Mary I
- Enrico Mangini
- Felice Minotti
- Leonilde Montesi as Derna
