= The Handsome, the Ugly, and the Stupid =

1967 film

The Handsome, the Ugly, and the Stupid (Il bello, il brutto, il cretino)
- Directed by: Giovanni Grimaldi
- Written by: Giovanni Grimaldi
- Produced by: Gino Mordini
- Starring: Franco Franchi & Ciccio Ingrassia and Mimmo Palmara
- Cinematography: Aldo Giordani
- Edited by: Renato Cinquini
- Music by: Lallo Gori
- Release date: 1967
- Running time: 92 min
- Country: Italy
- Language: Italian

Il bello, il brutto, il cretino, internationally known as The Handsome, the Ugly, and the Stupid is a 1967 Italian film directed by Giovanni Grimaldi starring the comic duo Franco and Ciccio. It is a Spaghetti Western parody of The Good, the Bad and the Ugly.

== Plot summary ==
Bandits Franco and Ciccio, being unlucky in committing robberies, have an ingenious way to collect money: Ciccio is captured by the sheriffs' deputies, while Franco, enjoying the collected bounty, saves his friend just before he is hanged every time. But one day Franco is unable to save his friend, and he believes Ciccio lost forever. After getting drunk in a saloon, and also winning a lot of money playing poker, Franco magically meets Ciccio, who is not only not dead but also plans to take revenge on Franco. However, when he discovers with his friend the existence of a great treasure, buried out in the desert, the two renew their partnership.

== Cast ==
- Franco Franchi as Franco, the ugly
- Ciccio Ingrassia as Ciccio Ingrassy, the stupid
- Mimmo Palmara as the "Handsome"
- Birgit Petri as Fabienne
- Lothar Gunther as Cpt. Imbriatella
- Enzo Andronico as Prisoner
- Gino Buzzanca as Bookmaker
- Bruno Scipioni
