= Easy Years =

- Directed by: Luigi Zampa
- Written by: Sergio Amidei; Vitaliano Brancati; Vincenzo Talarico
- Produced by: Dino De Laurentiis; Carlo Ponti
- Starring: Nino Taranto
- Cinematography: Aldo Tonti
- Edited by: Eraldo Da Roma
- Music by: Nino Rota
- Release date: 12 November 1953
- Running time: 103 minutes
- Country: Italy
- Language: Italian

Easy Years (Italian: Anni facili) is a 1953 drama film directed by Luigi Zampa and starring Nino Taranto.

== Cast ==
- Nino Taranto as Professor Luigi De Francesco
- Clelia Matania as Rosina, his wife
- Giovanna Ralli as Teresa, his daughter
- Gino Buzzanca as Baron Ferdinando La Prua
- Armenia Balducci as Baroness La Prua
- Salvatore Campochiaro as preside
- Flirt Consalvo as Rosolino Loffredo
- Gabriele Tinti as Piero Loffredo
- Angiola Maria Faranda as Teresa Loffredo
- Eleonora Tranchina as Assunta Loffredo
- Checco Durante as doorman Ministero
- Gildo Bocci as usciere al Ministero
- Mara Berni as Vercesi, studentessa procace
- Guglielmo Inglese as capo divisione al Ministero
- Aldo Casino as comm. Larina
- Alda Mangini as Fedora Larina
- Giovanni Grasso as Mario Rapisarda
- Turi Pandolfini as the veteran
- Riccardo Billi as himself
- Mario Riva as himself
- Domenico Modugno as Lawyer Rocco Santoro
