= Duel of Fire =

- Directed by: Umberto Lenzi
- Written by: Ugo Guerra; Luciano Martino
- Starring: Fernando Lamas
- Music by: Gino Filippini
- Distributed by: American International Pictures (US)
- Release date: 1962 (US)
- Running time: 85 minutes
- Country: Italy
- Language: English

Duel of Fire (Italian: Duello nella Sila) is a 1962 Italian adventure film directed by Umberto Lenzi. It starred Fernando Lamas and Liana Orfei. It was picked up for distribution in the US by AIP.

== Cast ==
- Fernando Lamas: Antonio Franco
- Liana Orfei: Maruzza
- Armand Mestral: Rocco Gravina
- Lisa Gastoni: Miss Parker
- Enzo Cerusico: Policeman
- Daniela Igliozzi: Dina Franco
- Gino Buzzanca: Baron Carteri
- Nino Vingelli
