= Sergio Tedesco =

Italian voice actor (1928–2012)

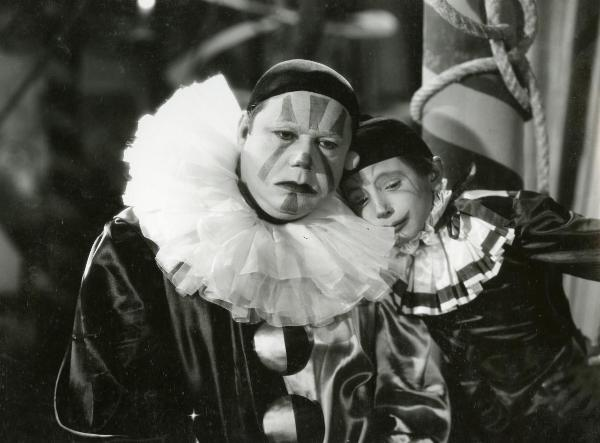
- Tedesco (right) with Juan de Landa in La forza bruta (1941)
- Born: 23 April 1928; La Spezia, Italy
- Died: 3 June 2012 (aged 84); Perugia, Italy
- Occupations: Actor; voice actor; tenor
- Years active: 1938–2012
- Children: Maurizio; Paola
- Musical career
- Genres: Opera; Easy listening; Swing music
- Instrument: Vocals
- Labels: CGD; CAM; Walt Disney Records

Sergio Tedesco (23 April 1928 – 3 June 2012) was an Italian actor, voice actor and operatic tenor.

== Biography ==
Tedesco was born in La Spezia. His father died when he was nine years old and he moved to Rome with his mother to help get a head start on his career. He eventually made his film debut in the 1941 film Il bazar delle idee directed by Marcello Albani. He acted in two other films that same year.

As the years passed, Tedesco showed a natural talent in singing. He performed as a tenor at the Rome Opera House a few times and has acted and sung in several plays and made collaborations with Mario Zafred, Tito Gobbi, Renato Capecchi and Carlo Maria Giulini. Tedesco also performed at the Carignano Theatre in Turin and La Fenice in Venice. In 1998, Tedesco officially retired from opera singing.

Tedesco was also a very successful voice dubber. He voiced Kaa in the Italian version of The Jungle Book and he even reprised the role in the 2003 sequel. He also dubbed Avery Bullock in the Italian dub of American Dad, Sam the Eagle and Statler in The Muppets from 1979 to 1999, Gopher in Winnie the Pooh and the Honey Tree, J. Audubon Woodlore, Spike (also known as Buzz-Buzz) in Bee on Guard, Donald Duck in the 1970s, Mickey Mouse in the 1960s and Speaker of Goofy shorts in Father's Weekend, How to Play Football and Double Dribble.

=== Personal life ===
Tedesco had two children. His daughter Paola Tedesco is an actress and his son Maurizio Tedesco is a film producer.

== Death ==
Tedesco died on 3 June 2012 at the age of 84, after suffering a long illness. He spent the last 17 years of his life in Perugia, where he died.

== Filmography ==
=== Cinema ===
- Il bazar delle idee (1941)
- La forza bruta (1941)
- Amore imperiale (1941)
- The White Angel (1955)
- Piluk, the Timid One (1968)
- Flight from Paradise (1990)
- The House of Chicken (2001)

== Dubbing roles ==
=== Animation ===
- Avery Bullock in American Dad! (seasons 1–7)
- Kaa in The Jungle Book, The Jungle Book 2
- Sir Hiss in Robin Hood
- Prince Phillip in Sleeping Beauty
- Sam the Eagle and Statler in The Muppet Movie
- Sam the Eagle in The Great Muppet Caper, Muppets from Space
- Sam the Eagle (Headmaster) and Statler (Jacob Marley) in The Muppet Christmas Carol
- Sam the Eagle (Samuel Arrow) and Statler in Muppet Treasure Island
- Television Announcer in One Hundred and One Dalmatians
- Jaq in Cinderella
- Corn Pone in Hey There, It's Yogi Bear!
- Gopher in Winnie the Pooh and the Honey Tree
- Cotton Hill in King of the Hill (seasons 1–8)
- Angus MacBadger / Sleepy Hollow Narrator in The Adventures of Ichabod and Mr. Toad

=== Live action ===
- Richard Rich in A Man for All Seasons
- Wackford Squeers in Nicholas Nickleby
- King William IV in The Young Victoria
- I. Y. Yunioshi in Breakfast at Tiffany's
- Ebenezer Scrooge in Scrooge
- George Dunlap in Shoot the Moon
- Danny in Night Must Fall
- Peter Thorndyke in The Love Bug
- Frank Burns in M*A*S*H
- Mr. Strickland in Back to the Future Part II
- Dodge in Planet of the Apes
- Serge Shubin in Mata Hari (1983 redub)
- Clyde Bowren in The Dirty Dozen
- General Orlov in Octopussy
- Auguste Balls in Trail of the Pink Panther
- Marcus Brody in Indiana Jones and the Last Crusade
- Edwin Flagg in What Ever Happened to Baby Jane?
- Rufus S. Bratton in Tora! Tora! Tora!
- Ángel Calderón de la Barca y Belgrano in Amistad
- Sir Cuthbert Ware-Armitage in Monte Carlo or Bust!
