= Paola Tedesco =

Italian actress, voice actress and singer

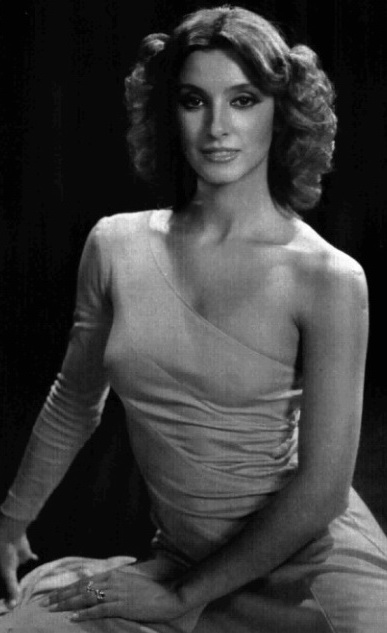
- Tedesco in the magazine Radiocorriere (1975)
- Born: 28 March 1952 (age 74); Rome, Italy
- Occupations: Actress; voice actress; singer
- Years active: 1964–present
- Father: Sergio Tedesco
- Relatives: Maurizio Tedesco (brother)
- Musical career
- Genres: Europop; Eurodisco
- Years active: 1975–1978
- Label: La voce del padrone

Paola Tedesco (born 28 March 1952) is an Italian actress, voice actress and singer.

== Biography ==
Born in Rome, the daughter of actor and tenor Sergio Tedesco and the younger sister of film producer Maurizio Tedesco, Paola Tedesco made her film debut at the age of 12, chosen by Pier Paolo Pasolini to play Salome in The Gospel According to St. Matthew (1964).

After a long hiatus and a few minor roles (including Rosaline in the 1968 film Romeo and Juliet), she resurfaced in 1971, playing the title role in the Mario Amendola's musicarello Lady Barbara. In subsequent years, Tedesco successfully starred in several comedy and genre films. She was also active on televisions, in TV-movies, series and variety shows.

== Filmography ==
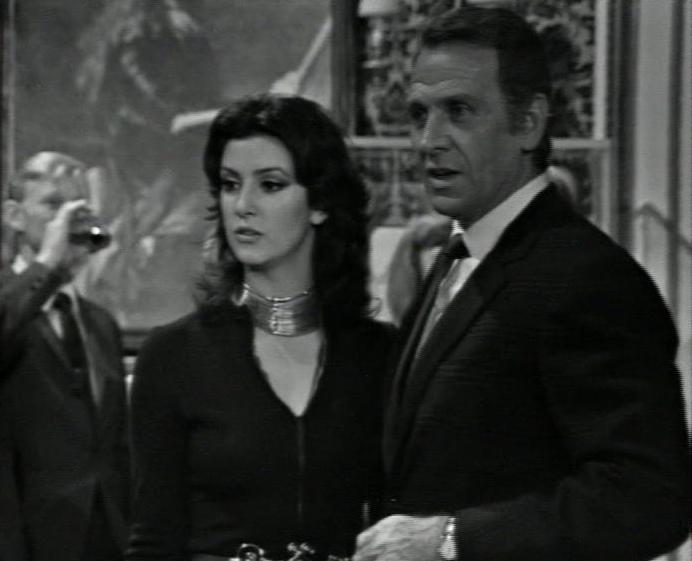
Tedesco (left) with Massimo Girotti in Il segno del comando (1971)

=== Cinema ===
- The Gospel According to St. Matthew (1964) – Salomè
- Romeo and Juliet (1968) – Rosaline (uncredited)
- Satyricon (1969) – Criside, Circe's handmaid
- Hurrah For the Women! (1970) – Nené, the cashier
- L'homme orchestre (1970) – La fille sicilienne
- Lady Barbara (1970) – Lady Barbara Parker
- I due maghi del pallone (1970) – Mayor's Daughter
- Belle d'amore (1970) – Monique
- Man of the Year (1971) – Friend of Cocò
- The Two Aces of Boxing (1971) – Marisa
- The Nights of Boccaccio (1972) – Lidia
- Crime Boss (1972) – Monica
- One Russian Summer (1973) – Yulya
- Battle of the Amazons (1973) – Valeria
- Silent Action (1975) – Giuliana Raimondi aka la Tunisina
- Il sogno di Zorro (1975) – Zaira
- Amore grande, amore libero (1976) – Simona
- Le seminariste (1976) – Gertrude
- Nerone (1977) – Licia
- Watch Me When I Kill (1977) – Mara
- Satan's Wife (1979) – Anna Merrill
- I Hate Blondes (1980) – Teresa
- Lucky and Zorba (1998) – Rosa Dei Venti (voice)

=== Television ===
- Il segno del comando (1971) – Barbara
- Door into Darkness (1973)
- La granduchessa e i camerieri (1977)

== Dubbing roles ==
=== Animation ===
- Zira in The Lion King II: Simba's Pride
- Muriel P. Finster in Recess
- Grand Councilwoman in Lilo & Stitch, Stitch! The Movie, Leroy & Stitch
- Dr. Blight in Captain Planet and the Planeteers
- Baba Yaga in Bartok the Magnificent
- Elgar in The New Adventures of Ocean Girl

=== Live action ===
- Ms. Kornblut in Marley & Me
- Diane Freed in Happiness
- Nanny in So Notorious
