= Ignazio Leone =

Italian actor (1923–1976)

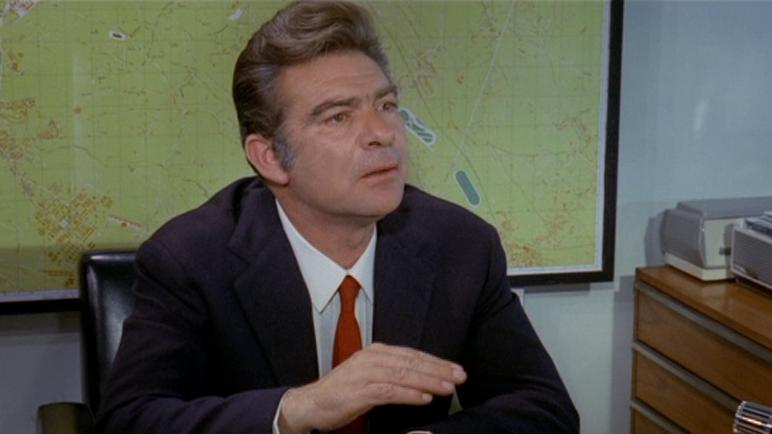
- Leone in Io non spezzo... rompo (1971)
- Born: 19 April 1923; Palermo, Italy
- Died: 30 December 1976 (aged 53); Turin, Italy
- Occupation: Actor
- Years active: 1952–1976

Ignazio Leone (19 April 1923 – 30 December 1976) was an Italian film actor. He appeared in 105 films between 1952 and 1976.

== Career ==
Born in Palermo, Leone started his career in the avanspettacolo. His breakthrough came with the role of Verdolini, a character parodying Roberto Rossellini, in An American in Rome. Starting from the 1960s, he was a regular in Franco and Ciccio and Lando Buzzanca's comedy films.

== Selected filmography ==
- The Walk (1953)
- I Chose Love (1953)
- Friends for Life (1955)
- A Woman Alone (1956)
- Wives and Obscurities (1956)
- Piece of the Sky (1959)
- Slave of Rome (1960)
- Urlatori alla sbarra (1960) as Carlo Alighiero
- Le pillole di Ercole (1962)
- I Don Giovanni della Costa Azzurra (1962)
- Julius Caesar Against The Pirates (1962)
- Zorro and the Three Musketeers (1963)
- I maniaci (1964) as Migliardi
- I due pericoli pubblici (1965) as the insurance lawyer
- 002 Operazione Luna (1965) as Sergio
- I due parà (1967) as Sergean Sullivan
- Special Code: Assignment Lost Formula (1966)
- Electra One (1967)
- Il lungo, il corto, il gatto (1967) as the poolhall owner
- I 2 deputati (1968)
- The Two Crusaders (1968)
- Brutti di notte (1968)
- Indovina chi viene a merenda? (1969)
- Io non spezzo... rompo (1971)
- Armiamoci e partite! (1971)
- Le notti peccaminose di Pietro l'Aretino (1972)
- House of 1000 Pleasures (1973)
- A forza di sberle (1974)
