= Gino Buzzanca =

Italian actor (1912–1985)

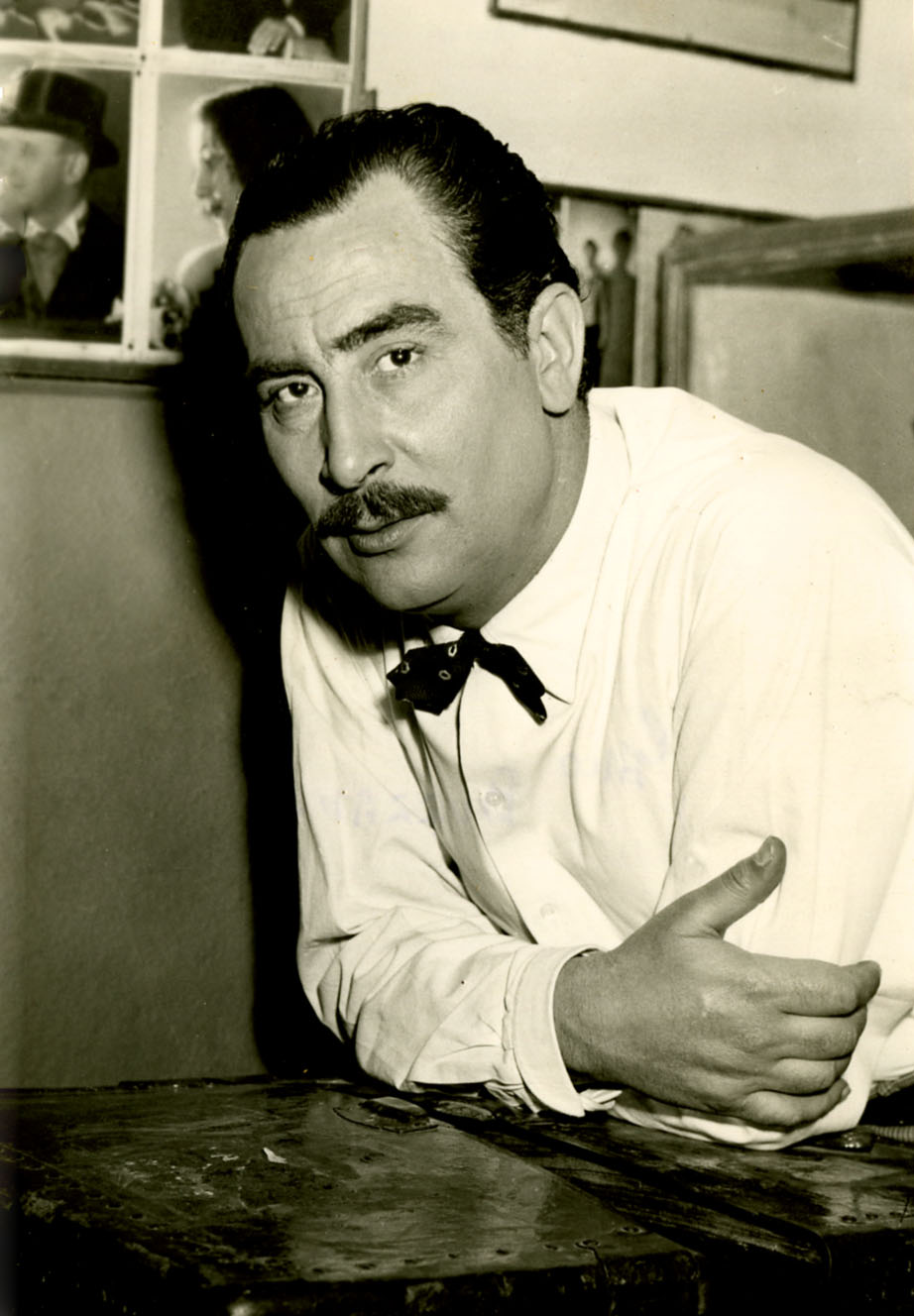
- Born: 8 March 1912; Messina, Italy
- Died: 5 May 1985 (aged 73); Rome, Italy

Gino Buzzanca (8 March 1912 – 5 May 1985) was an Italian film actor.

== Life and career ==
Born in Messina, Buzzanca began his career on stage, specializing as an actor of the Sicilian language theater, and starring in works by Luigi Pirandello and Giovanni Verga. Discovered by Luigi Zampa, who offered him a role of weight in the film Easy Years, Buzzanca then had a long film career as a character actor, often cast in negative roles. He also appeared in several Spaghetti Westerns, usually credited as Bill Jackson. He was the uncle of the actor Lando Buzzanca.

== Partial filmography ==
- Easy Years (1953) - Barone Ferdinando LaPrua
- Woman of Rome (1954) - Riccardo
- Due lacrime (1954) - Tony
- The Art of Getting Along (1955) - Il barone Mazzei
- Are We Men or Corporals? (1955) - Il regista
- Il bidone (1955) - Saro (uncredited)
- Yalis, la vergine del Roncador (1955)
- Agguato sul mare (1955) - Elia
- A Woman Alone (1956)
- Vendicata! (1956)
- Roland the Mighty (1956)
- Peccato di castità (1956)
- Parola di ladro (1957)
- Addio sogni di gloria (1957)
- Doctor and the Healer (1957) - Il sindaco di Pianetta
- A sud niente di nuovo (1957)
- Rascel-Fifì (1957) - Gionata - il capo della gang
- L'amore nasce a Roma (1958) - padre di Mario
- Serenatella sciuè sciuè (1958) - don Ciccillo
- Caporale di giornata (1958) - Commendator Bianconi
- Conspiracy of the Borgias (1959)
- Arriva la banda (1959) - Il padre di Anna
- Il cavaliere senza terra (1959)
- I mafiosi (1959) - John Mistretta
- Prepotenti più di prima (1959) - Rosario
- Perfide.... ma belle (1959)
- Nel blu dipinto di blu (1959) - The Sicilian Industrialist
- Guardatele ma non toccatele (1959) - Maggiore
- Tipi da spiaggia (1959) - Giovanni Buzzanca - the theatre manager
- Gentlemen Are Born (1960)
- Colossus and the Amazon Queen (1960) - Mercante #2
- Robin Hood and the Pirates (1960) - Capitan Uncino
- Caravan petrol (1960)
- Garibaldi (1961) - Rosa's Father
- L'onorata società (1961) - Salvatore Zappalà
- The Secret of the Black Falcon (1961) - Gouverneur di Melida
- Totòtruffa 62 (1961) - The Ambassador of Nicarogua
- The Fascist (1961)
- Maciste contro Ercole nella valle dei guai (1961)
- L'urlo dei bolidi (1961)
- Caribbean Hawk (1962) - Nobleman (uncredited)
- Duel of Fire (1962) - Barone Carteri
- Musketeers of the Sea (1962) - Capo Ciurma Gutierrez
- Love in Four Dimensions (1964)
- I due mafiosi (1964) - Don Calogero
- I due toreri (1965) - Maresciallo
- Soldati e caporali (1965) - Maresciallo Luigi Donatone
- Two Mafiosi Against Goldginger (1965) - (uncredited)
- Due mafiosi contro Al Capone (1966) - Calogero
- Ringo and Gringo Against All (1966) - Il messicano
- I due sanculotti (1966) - Executioner
- Giorno caldo al Paradiso Show (1966)
- 7 monaci d'oro (1966) - Alfio
- Cjamango (1967)
- The Handsome, the Ugly, and the Stupid (1967) - Bookmaker
- Don't Wait, Django... Shoot! (1967) - Don Alvarez (final film role)
