= I due maghi del pallone =

1970 film by Mariano Laurenti

- Directed by: Mariano Laurenti
- Written by: Roberto Gianviti
- Produced by: Leo Cevenini; Vittorio Martino
- Starring: Franco Franchi; Ciccio Ingrassia
- Cinematography: Tino Santoni
- Edited by: Giuliana Attenni
- Music by: Bruno Nicolai
- Distributed by: Variety Distribution
- Release date: 2 December 1970
- Running time: 95 min
- Country: Italy
- Language: Italian

I due maghi del pallone (The two wizards of the ball) is a 1970 Italian comedy film directed by Mariano Laurenti starring the comic duo Franco and Ciccio.

== Plot summary ==
Ciccio Ingrassetti is the PR of a Milanese pharmaceutical firm which is trying to promote its products through the football team of its Sicilian branch. To guarantee success, the owner asks Ciccio to secure the talents of an innovative coach, a "magician" (just like Inter Milan coach Helenio Herrera was dubbed at the time). Ciccio, totally unaware of the subtleties of football (but loath to confess his ignorance of the matter to his boss) misinterprets his orders and hires K.K., an impostor 'clairvoyant' who actually tries to help the team through his 'spells'. Hijinks and mishaps soon ensue.

== Cast ==
- Franco Franchi: K.K.
- Ciccio Ingrassia: Ciccio Ingrassetti
- Lionello: Tonino
- Karin Schubert: Gretel
- Elio Crovetto: Baldinotti
- Umberto D'Orsi: Cazzaniga
- Tiberio Murgia: Concettino Lo Brutto
- Enzo Andronico: Major of Pizzusiccu
- Paola Tedesco: Daughter of the Major
- Luca Sportelli: President of Ghiandineddese
- Dada Gallotti: Adalgisa
- Nino Vingelli: Don Alfio
- Ignazio Balsamo: Manager of Ghiandineddese
- Renato Cecilia : the Warehouseman
