= Piedino il questurino =

- Directed by: Franco Lo Cascio
- Written by: Marino Onorati
- Produced by: Ettore Rosboch; Galliano Juso
- Starring: Franco Franchi
- Cinematography: Marcello Masciocchi
- Music by: Ubaldo Continiello
- Release date: 1974
- Language: Italian

Piedino il questurino (Italian for "Littlefoot the policeman") is a 1974 criminal comedy film directed by Franco Lo Cascio and starring Franco Franchi. It is a parody of Steno's Flatfoot.

== Cast ==
- Franco Franchi as Franco Petralia
- Irina Maleeva as Maria
- Rosita Pisano as Nunziatina
- Giuseppe Anatrelli as Pascalone Pera
- Giacomo Rizzo as Nunziatina's Son
- Nino Terzo as Pascalone's Brother
- Enzo Andronico as Commissioner Pappacoda
- Luca Sportelli as Scrap Yard Owner
- Pinuccio Ardia as Ferdinando Quagliarone aka 'Baron'
- Renato Malavasi as Polpetti
- Dante Cleri as Waiter
- Gino Pagnani as Spacciatore
- Gastone Pescucci as Priest
