= Domenico Modugno =

Italian singer, actor and politician (1928–1994)

The Honourable Domenico Modugno
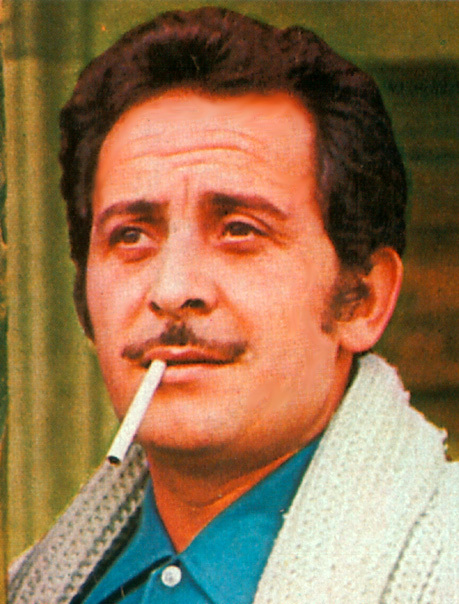
- Modugno at Partitissima in 1967

Member of the Senate of the Republic
- In office 18 April 1990 – 22 April 1992
- Constituency: Rome

Member of the Chamber of Deputies
- In office 2 July 1987 – 18 April 1990
- Constituency: Turin

Personal details
- Born: 9 January 1928 Polignano a Mare, Apulia, Kingdom of Italy
- Died: 6 August 1994 (aged 66) Lampedusa, Sicily, Italy
- Party: Radical Party
- Height: 1.75 m (5 ft 9 in)
- Spouse: Franca Gandolfi (m. 1955)
- Children: 4
- Occupation: Singer; songwriter; actor; politician
- Musical career
- Genres: Neapolitan song; pop; folk
- Instruments: Vocals; guitar
- Years active: 1953–1993
- Labels: RCA; Fonit Cetra; Carosello; Panarecord; Decca; Polydor; Jubilee

Domenico Modugno (Italian pronunciation: [doˈmeːniko moˈduɲɲo]; 9 January 1928 – 6 August 1994) was an Italian singer, songwriter, actor and, later in life, a member of the Italian Parliament. He is known for his 1958 international hit song "Nel blu dipinto di blu", for which he received the first Grammy Awards for Record of the Year and Song of the Year. He is considered the first Italian cantautore.

== Early life ==
The youngest of four children, Modugno was born at Polignano a Mare, in the province of Bari (Apulia), on 9 January 1928. His father, Vito Cosimo Modugno, was a municipal police commander, while his mother, Pasqua Lorusso, was a housewife.

At the age of 9, his family moved to San Pietro Vernotico, in the Province of Brindisi, where his father was transferred for a new job position. Here Domenico attended primary school and learned San Pietro Vernotico's dialect, which belongs to the linguistic area of Salentino dialect, similar to Sicilian. He attended secondary school in Lecce.

== Career ==
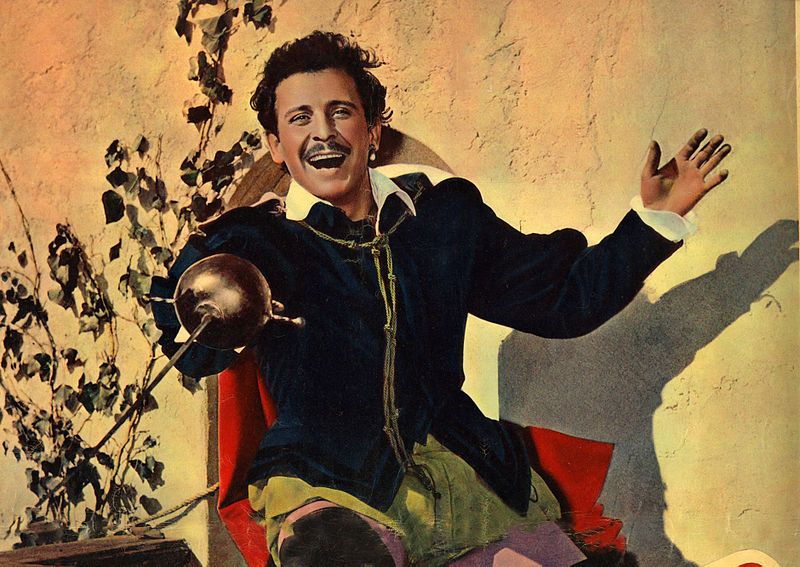
Modugno in 1955

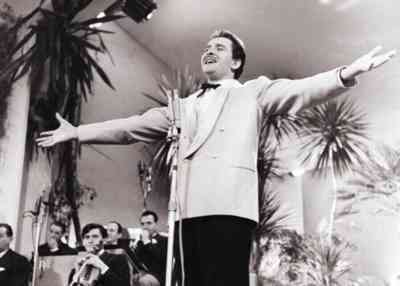
Modugno opens his arms while performing "Nel blu, dipinto di blu" (better known as "Volare") at the 1958 Sanremo Music Festival

While still studying, Modugno had a role in a cinematographic version of Filumena Marturano by Eduardo De Filippo as well as some other films. In 1957, his song "Lazzarella", sung by Aurelio Fierro, came second in the Festival della Canzone Napoletana, bringing him his first taste of popularity.

In 1958, Modugno took part in Antonio Aniante's comedy La Rosa di Zolfo at the Festival della Prosa in Venice. Also in 1958, he discovered the Italian comedy duo of Franco and Ciccio, became their manager and got them into a long-running film career. The turning point of his career came in that year, when he also participated in the Sanremo Music Festival, presenting, together with Johnny Dorelli, the song "Nel blu dipinto di blu." Co-authored by Modugno and Franco Migliacci, the song won the contest and became an enormous success worldwide. It received two Grammy Awards with sales above 22 million copies, and represented Italy in the Eurovision Song Contest 1958, where it came in third.

Modugno reportedly used the money gained with "Nel blu dipinto di blu" to purchase a Ferrari; however, his car was totalled in an accident, which included his fenders being smashed. This was mentioned in the Allan Sherman song "America's a nice Italian Name".

In 1959, Modugno won the Sanremo Music Festival for the second time in a row, with "Piove" (also known as "Ciao, ciao bambina"), and received second place in 1960 with "Libero". This was a successful period of time for Modugno who again represented Italy in the Eurovision Song Contest of 1959. Later his hit song "Io" was sung by Elvis Presley in English with the title "Ask Me".

In 1962, Modugno won the Sanremo Music Festival a third time with "Addio..., addio...." Four years later, he again represented Italy at Eurovision with "Dio, come ti amo". Sergio Franchi recorded it in Italian (titled "Oh How Much I Love You (Dio, come ti amo!)) on his 1967 RCA Victor album, From Sergio-with Love. Jack Jones recorded it in English for his 1967 album, Our Song, under the title "Oh How Much I Love You".Shirley Bassey also recorded it with the title Oh God How Much I Love You, on her album Keep the Music Playing in 1991.

Modugno was an actor in 44 movies (such as Appuntamento a Ischia), and was a film producer of two (Tutto è musica of 1963 was his own biographical production).

In 1970, Modugno focused on more classic music genres and profiles, as a singer and as a musician, adapting poetry, acting on television and in lead singing roles in modern operas.

== Final years ==
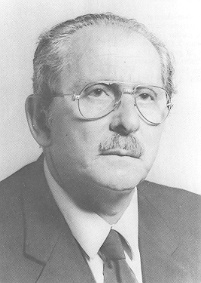

In 1984, Modugno suffered a severe stroke and remained partially paralyzed; this forced him to abandon his artistic career and devote himself to rehab.

From 1986, he worked for the rights of disabled people, and in June 1987, he was elected congressman for Turin in the Italian Parliament, in the ranks of the Radical Party, a liberal-social political group. In the past, he had supported the campaigns of the Italian Socialist Party and one for divorce, in addition to criticizing the human rights violations by the regime of Augusto Pinochet, that cost him a denial of entry in Chile, where he had been scheduled to hold a concert. In this last stage of his life, instead, he was very active in social issues, fighting against the inhumane conditions of patients in the Agrigento psychiatric hospital.

Modugno returned to the music scene, definitively (he already held a concert for former inmates of Agrigento's mental asylum, in 1989), in 1992–1993. His last song was Delfini (Dolphins), in 1993 with his son, Massimo.

On 6 August 1994, Modugno died of a heart attack at the age of 66, on the island of Lampedusa, south of Sicily, while he was in his home by the sea. His beach villa was put up for sale in 2020. It is located on Rabbits' Islet beach; the location is part of a natural protected reserve with limestones and crags.

== Discography ==
Domenico Modugno "Nel blu dipinto di blu" (1958)
"Nel blu dipinto di blu" was Modugno's signature song.

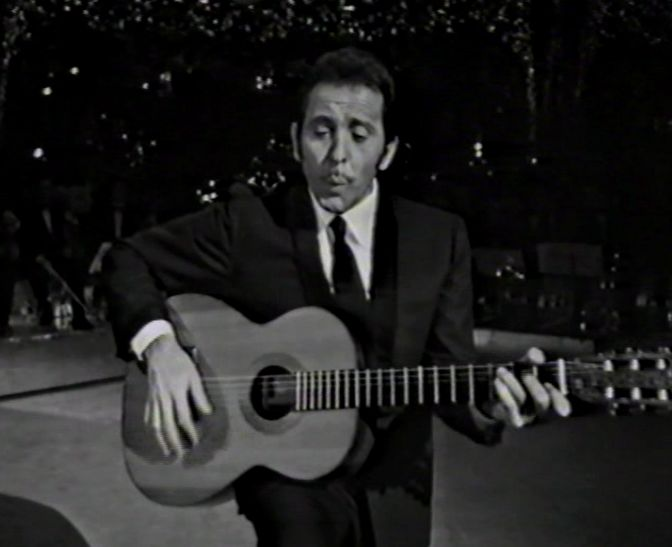
Modugno in 1969

=== Studio albums ===
- I successi di Domenico Modugno (1955)
- I successi di Domenico Modugno II (1955)
- Domenico Modugno e la sua chitarra - Un poeta un pittore un musicista (1956)
- Domenico Modugno e la sua chitarra nº 2 - Un poeta un pittore un musicista (1956)
- La strada dei successi (1958)
- Domenico Modugno (1958)
- Domenico è sempre Domenico (1958)
- Domenico Modugno (1959)
- Modugno (1961)
- Rinaldo in campo (1961)
- Domenico Modugno (1962)
- Tutto è musica (1963)
- Modugno siciliano (1963)
- Modugno (1964)
- Dio, come ti amo (1966)
- Modugno (1967)
- Domenico Modugno (1968)
- Domenico Modugno (1970)
- Con l'affetto della memoria (1971)
- Tutto Modugno (1972)
- Il mio cavallo bianco (1973)
- Piange... il telefono e le più belle canzoni di Domenico Modugno (1975)
- L'anniversario (1976)
- Cyrano (1978)
- Pazzo amore (1984)

Posthumous releases

- L'arca di Modugno (1997)
- Io, Domenico Modugno (1997)

=== Live albums ===
- Dal vivo alla Bussoladomani (1977)

Posthumous releases

- I concerti live @ RTSI (2001)
- Domenico Modugno Radio Show (2006)

=== Notable singles ===
- "Vecchio frac" (1955)
- "Resta cu'mme" (1956)
- "'O ccafé" (1958)
- "Nel blu, dipinto di blu" (1958)
- "Piove (Ciao, ciao bambina)" (1959)
- "'O sole mio" (1960)
- "Libero" (1960)
- "Addio… Addio…" (1962)
- "Dio, come ti amo" (1966) with Gigliola Cinquetti
- "Sopra i tetti azzurri del mio pazzo amore" (1967)
- "La lontananza" (1970)
- "Come stai" (1971) with Carmen Villani
- "Un calcio alla città" (1972)
- "Questa è la mia vita" (1974)
- "Piange... il telefono" (1975)
- "Malarazza" (1976)
- "Delfini (Sai che c'è)" (1993) with Massimo Modugno

== Filmography ==
=== Film ===
Year	Title	Role	Notes
1949	The Firemen of Viggiù	Gaetana's Companion	Cameo
1951	Destiny	Turiddu	
1951	Cameriera bella presenza offresi...	Enrico	
1951	Filumena Marturano	Lawyer Nocella	
1952	Genoese Dragnet	Police Inspector	Cameo
1952	Heroic Charge	Sicilian Soldier	
1953	La carovana del peccato	Vanni	
1953	Easy Years	Rocco Santoro	
1954	Of Life and Love	'Ntoni	Segment: "La giara"
1954	Magic Village	Agatina's Brother	
1954	Knights of the Queen	Athos	
1955	Da qui all'eredità	Marisa's Lover	
1955	I pinguini ci guardano	Himself	
1955	Il mantello rosso	Saro	
1956	Accadde di notte	Singer	Cameo
1957	Lazzarella	Mimì	
1958	Io, mammeta e tu	Gaetano	
1959	Europe by Night	Himself	Documentary
1959	Nel blu, dipinto di blu	Turi La Rosa	
1959	Destinazione Sanremo	Himself	Cameo
1959	Esterina	Piero	
1960	Sanremo: La grande sfida	Himself	Cameo
1960	Adua and Her Friends	Himself	Cameo
1960	Appuntamento a Ischia	Mimmo Rotunno	
1961	L'onorata società	Salvatore	Also composer
1961	The Last Judgement	The Singer	
1963	Tutto è musica	Himself	Also director, writer and composer
1966	Per un pugno di canzoni	Singer	Cameo
1967	Three Bites of the Apple	Remo Romano	
1968	Caprice Italian Style	Street Sweeper	
1972	The Scientific Cardplayer	Righetto	
1974	La sbandata	Salvatore Cannavone	
1975	Piange... il telefono	Andrea Balestrieri	Also composer
1976	The Violin Teacher	Giovanni Russo	
1983	"FF.SS." – Cioè: "...che mi hai portato a fare sopra a Posillipo se non mi vuoi più bene?"	Himself	Cameo; final film appearance
