= L'onorata società =

1961 film

- Film poster
- Directed by: Riccardo Pazzaglia
- Written by: Riccardo Pazzaglia
- Starring: Franco Franchi
- Cinematography: Václav Vích
- Music by: Domenico Modugno
- Release date: 1961
- Running time: 75 minutes
- Country: Italy
- Language: Italian

L'onorata società is a 1961 Italian comedy film written and directed by Riccardo Pazzaglia. It was shown as part of a retrospective on Italian comedy at the 67th Venice International Film Festival.

== Cast ==
- Franco Franchi as Salvatore
- Ciccio Ingrassia as Rosolino
- Domenico Modugno as Salvatore, the husband
- Rosanna Schiaffino as Rosaria, the wife
- Vittorio De Sica as Salvatore, the 'Capintesta'
- Didi Perego as Owner of 'Piccola Sicilia'
- Tiberio Murgia as Salvatore Trezza
- Marisa Belli as Rosetta Zappalà
- Gino Buzzanca as Salvatore Zappalà
