= Nino Vingelli =

Italian actor

- Born: 4 June 1912; Naples, Kingdom of Italy
- Died: 26 March 2003 (aged 90); Rome, Italy
- Occupation: Actor
- Years active: 1941–2000

Nino Vingelli (4 June 1912 – 26 March 2003) was an Italian film actor. He appeared in more than 200 films between 1941 and 2000.

== Selected filmography ==
- I mariti (Tempesta d'anime) (1941)
- The Betrothed (1941) - (uncredited)
- A che servono questi quattrini? (1942) - Il fruttivendolo
- Tempesta sul golfo (1943) - Cliente nella taverna
- Side Street Story (1950) - Giovanni
- Totò Tarzan (1950) - Capo stazione napoletano
- Women and Brigands (1950) - Ciccillo
- The Eternal Chain (1952) - Amedeo - Waiter (uncredited)
- The City Stands Trial (1952) - Pasqualino 'o 17
- Immortal Melodies (1952) - Fiorello
- Good Folk's Sunday (1953) - Un guappo napoletano
- Man, Beast and Virtue (1953)
- Legione straniera (1953) - Pietro
- La valigia dei sogni (1953) - Un detenuto
- Bread, Love and Dreams (1953) - Venditore ambulante
- Passione (1953)
- Cristo è passato sull'aia (1953)
- Daughters of Destiny (1954) - (segment "Elisabeth") (uncredited)
- The Country of the Campanelli (1954) - Capitano corrotto
- Of Life and Love (1954)
- Vestire gli ignudi (1954)
- Il seduttore (1954) - Onofrio
- Bread, Love and Jealousy (1954) - Venditore ambulante
- Toto Seeks Peace (1954) - Cameriere psicologo
- The Gold of Naples (1954) - Guappo (segment "Il guappo") (uncredited)
- Cento serenate (1954)
- Casta Diva (1954) - Il guappo
- Goodbye Naples (1955) - Pasqualino De Rosa
- Toto and Carolina (1955) - Brigadiere (uncredited)
- Chéri-Bibi (1955) - Palla di Gomma
- A Hero of Our Times (1955) - Brigadiere
- Cantami buongiorno tristezza (1955) - Guasco
- Nero's Weekend (1956)
- La rivale (1956) - Piedigrotta
- I vagabondi delle stelle (1956)
- Poor, But Handsome (1957) - Old 'Pappagallo'
- Oh! Sabella (1957)
- Pretty But Poor (1957) - L'impiegato della gioielleria
- A sud niente di nuovo (1957)
- Un amore senza fine (1958)
- Piece of the Sky (1958) - Impresario
- Legs of Gold (1958) - Carmine
- La sfida (1958) - Gennaro
- Il bacio del sole (Don Vesuvio) (1958) - Il brigadiere Spanò
- Tuppe tuppe, Marescià! (1958) - Novità
- Non sono più Guaglione (1958) - Barman
- The Law (1959) - Pizzaccio
- Prepotenti più di prima (1959) - Il barista
- Un canto nel deserto (1959) - Un legionario
- Lui, lei e il nonno (1959)
- The Magliari (1959) - Vincenzo
- La nipote Sabella (1959)
- Ferdinando I, re di Napoli (1959) - The angry Card Player
- Purple Noon (1960) - Minor Role (uncredited)
- Ti aspetterò all'inferno (1960) - Show Director
- Pirates of the Coast (1960) - Porro
- Totò, Peppino e... la dolce vita (1961) - Spacciatore (uncredited)
- Black City (1961) - Il ministro Sgarra
- Mina... fuori la guardia (1961) - L'impresario
- Fra' Manisco cerca guai (1961) - Vincenzino
- Che femmina!! E... che dollari! (1961)
- Duel of Fire (1962) - Giuseppe Villetti 'Sila'
- Totò e Peppino divisi a Berlino (1962) - (uncredited)
- La leggenda di Fra Diavolo (1962)
- Lo sgarro (1962)
- Canzoni a tempo di twist (1962)
- The Conjugal Bed (1963) - Man at the Cemetery
- Attack and Retreat (1964) - Amalfitano
- The Sucker (1965) - (uncredited)
- I figli del leopardo (1965) - Farm manager
- Casanova 70 (1965) - Man talking about Santina (uncredited)
- God's Thunder (1965) - Le patron du café
- Giant of the Evil Island (1965) - Tortilla
- L'uomo che ride (1966) - Ursus
- Lightning Bolt (1966) - Rehte Beer Janitor
- Europa canta (1966) - Jack, Gangster
- Johnny Oro (1966) - Fat Friend of Gilmore
- War Between the Planets (1966) - Man at Conference
- After the Fox (1966) - 3rd Judge (uncredited)
- Shoot Loud, Louder... I Don't Understand (1966)
- Operation White Shark (1966)
- Giorno caldo al Paradiso Show (1966)
- Cisco (1966) - Doctor Martin
- 7 monaci d'oro (1966) - Totonno
- Snow Devils (1967) - Peter
- Ballata da un miliardo (1967)
- Wanted (1967) - Honorable Townsman (uncredited)
- No Diamonds for Ursula (1967) - Carta Carbone
- Death Rides a Horse (1967) - Giocatore (uncredited)
- Death on the Run (1967) - Conducente del camioncino (uncredited)
- Hipnos follia di massacro (1967)
- Una ragazza tutta d'oro (1967) - Carabiniere
- Fantabulous Inc. (1967) - De Laurentiis, Producer of Commercial
- Delitto a Posillipo - Londra chiama Napoli (1967) - Napoletanino
- The Biggest Bundle of Them All (1968) - Restaurant Manager (uncredited)
- A Minute to Pray, a Second to Die (1968) - Man in Saloon (uncredited)
- Operazione ricchezza (1968)
- A suon di lupara (1968) - Il sindaco
- Zorro, the Navarra Marquis (1969) - Fra Pistola
- Puro siccome un Angelo papà mi fece monaco... di Monza (1969)
- Ma chi t'ha dato la patente? (1970)
- Many Wars Ago (1970) - Soldato presunto autoferito
- I due maghi del pallone (1970) - Don Alfio
- Mezzanotte d'amore (1970) - Ferdinando
- Gang War (1971) - Pasquale - il barista
- Ma che musica maestro (1971) - Train passenger
- Black Belly of the Tarantula (1971) - Inspector Di Giacomo
- Drummer of Vengeance (1971) - Poker Player
- Armiamoci e partite! (1971) - Train Employee
- I due assi del guantone (1971)
- Un apprezzato professionista di sicuro avvenire (1972) - Maresciallo
- Gang War in Naples (1972) - Prisoner
- Storia di fifa e di coltello - Er seguito d'er più (1972) - Cart-driver
- Le mille e una notte... e un'altra ancora! (1973) - Kadi
- Bella, ricca, lieve difetto fisico, cerca anima gemella (1973) - Newspaper Vendor
- The Black Hand (1973) - Don Gaetano
- Little Funny Guy (1973)
- Flatfoot (1973) - Old Man of Camorra
- Il figlioccio del padrino (1973) - Don Vincenzo Assistant #2
- Blood Brothers (1974) - Gigino la Charonge
- Furia nera (1975)
- Violent Naples (1976) - Don Antonio Polipo
- Blazing Flowers (1978) - Nicola
- Ring (1978) - Don Alfonsino
- The Payoff (1978) - Catelli
- Napoli serenata calibro 9 (1978) - Ricettatore
- Lo scugnizzo (1979)
- Café Express (1980) - Prete
- Carcerato (1981) - Maestro Scardeca
- Guapparia (1983)
- Spiaccichiccicaticelo (1984)
- Torna (1984)
- Teresa (1987) - Adelmo
- Kaputt Mundi (1998) - Don Pepe
- Tobia al caffè (2000) - Avvocato
