= I due della legione =

1962 film

- Directed by: Lucio Fulci
- Screenplay by: Antonio Leonviola; Roberto Bianchi Montero; Dino De Palma; Arnaldo Marrosu; Giancarlo Del Re; Lucio Fulci; Bruno Corbucci; Giovanni Grimaldi
- Starring: Franco Franchi; Ciccio Ingrassia; Rosalba Neri
- Cinematography: Alfio Contini
- Edited by: Mario Serandrei
- Music by: Luis Bacalov
- Production companies: Titanus; Ultra Film; Sicila Cinematografica
- Distributed by: Titanus
- Release date: August 17, 1962 (Turin)
- Running time: 97 minutes
- Country: Italy
- Language: Italian

I due della legione (lit. 'The Two From the Legion') is a 1962 Italian comedy film co-written and directed by Lucio Fulci, starring the comedy duo Franco and Ciccio.

== Cast ==
- Franco Franchi as Franco Cocuzza
- Ciccio Ingrassia as Ciccio Fisichella
- Rosalba Neri as Alina
- Maria Teresa Vianello as Charlette
- Alighiero Noschese as Mustafa Abdul Bey
- Aldo Giuffré as Sadrim Bey
- Aldo Bufi Landi as Cpt. Dupont
- Cesare Polacco as Commissioner
- Carlo Lombardi as Colonel
- Nino Terzo as Sgt. Tresport
- Jo Garsò as Saida
- Gianni Rizzo as Suprot
- Rosario Borelli as Roger
- Ferruccio Amendola as Gérard
- Enzo Andronico as Policeman

== Production ==
The film is the first of the 13 films directed by Fulci starring Franco and Ciccio. It marked the film debut of Alighiero Noschese. The screenplay had been originally written for the comedy duo formed by Ugo Tognazzi and Raimondo Vianello, but following the success of The Fascist Tognazzi became unavailable as he focused his career in higher profile productions.

Some scenes were shot in Naples reusing the same sets of Nanni Loy's The Four Days of Naples. In this film, Fulci altered the dynamic of the duo compared to their previous films, with Franco playing the fool and Ciccio as the more serious counterpart.

== Release and reception ==
Those Two in the Legion was released in Italy in Turin on August 17, 1962. This was followed by screenings in Rome on August 19, Bari on August 25, 1962. It was a surprise hit at the box office.

Italian-language screenings in predominantly English-speaking countries were made for the film. Which included a release in Petersham, Australia on February 5, 1966 and Philadelphia, PA on October 10, 1966. Corriere della Sera contemporary review claimed that 'Fulci probably relied too much on the mimicry qualities of the two protagonists, nevertheless the laughs are not lacking'.
