= I figli del leopardo =

- Directed by: Sergio Corbucci
- Written by: Bruno Corbucci; Giovanni Grimaldi
- Starring: Franco Franchi; Ciccio Ingrassia
- Music by: Piero Umiliani
- Release date: 21 April 1965
- Running time: 98 minutes
- Country: Italy
- Language: Italian

I figli del leopardo (also known as Sons of the Leopard) is a 1965 Italian comedy film directed by Sergio Corbucci starring the comic duo Franco and Ciccio that is a parody of The Leopard.

== Plot ==
Sicily, 1860. The Baron Tulico is a penniless man and womanizer, who abandons his mistress Maria Rosa for a marriage of convenience. The two pharmacists Franco and Ciccio, called for help from Maria, try to put the baron's head in place, but do not have time, because the two are recruited into the army of Giuseppe Garibaldi. After many adventures Franco and Ciccio track the baron, and force him to recognize the two of them as his legitimate children.

== Cast ==
- Franco Franchi - Franco / Maria Rosa
- Ciccio Ingrassia - Ciccio / Baron Fifi
- Evi Marandi - Margherita
- Raimondo Vianello - General Baldigari
- Alberto Bonucci - Babalone
- Anthony Steffen - Tenente Garibaldino (as Antonio De Teffè)
- Vittorio Congia - Sgt. Nando Tazza
- Silvio Bagolini - Don Basilio
- Nino Vingelli -Farm manager
- Mimmo Poli - Farm manager
- Mario Castellani
- Elisa Mainardi
- Ugo Bonardi
- Eva Gioia
