= I barbieri di Sicilia =

- Directed by: Marcello Ciorciolini
- Written by: Marcello Ciorciolini; Roberto Gianviti; Dino Verde
- Cinematography: Tino Santoni
- Music by: Piero Umiliani
- Release date: 1967
- Running time: 90 minutes
- Country: Italy
- Language: Italian

I barbieri di Sicilia ("The Barbers of Sicily") is a 1967 Italian war-comedy film written and directed by Marcello Ciorciolini starring the comic duo Franco and Ciccio.

== Plot ==
Franco Lo Persico is a barber for men, while his cousin Ciccio Lo Persico is a hairdresser for women. Both are in love with Rosina Giovinazzo, niece of the ugly aunt Donna Maruzza.

In the Sicilian village of Santa Rosalia, the Americans are about to land and the Germans send Colonel Otto von Kraus. He wants to make believe that he is there to rest with his wife, but instead is accompanied by two important chemists, Stulz and Ebner, to stop the landing of the Americans.

The Americans send an officer to the country to destroy the plans of the Germans. This in town is presented as Stefano Minasi, nephew of the priest Don Liborio. The village boss Don Calogero Milazzo makes him work in Ciccio's hairdressing shop as an assistant. Through a transmitter hidden in the parish confessional, Stefano lets the Americans know when the time is right to land in Sicily. When Franco and Ciccio arrive, for their skill, they receive a prize of 10 000 dollars, with which they will open a Coiffeur pour dames together with the barber, all in a single shop. Eventually Steve Minasi marries Rosalia, removing the beautiful Sicilian girl in front of Franco and Ciccio's eyes.

== Cast ==
- Franco Franchi as Franco Lo Persico
- Ciccio Ingrassia as Ciccio Lo Persico
- Daniela Giordano as Rosina
- Carlo Hintermann as Colonel Von Krauss
- Giorgia Moll as Helga Von Krauss
- Mario Maranzana as Don Calogero Milazzo
- Jean Valmont as Captain Steve Minasi
- Enzo Andronico as Podestà
- Ignazio Spalla as Turi the farmer
- Adriana Facchetti as Donna Maruzza
- Franco Pesce as Don Liborio
