= Avanspettacolo =

Avanspettacolo (lit. 'before the show') is an Italian theatrical genre that developed between the 1930s and 1950s. Closely related to revue and variety show, avanspettacolo features a diverse mixture of music, ballet, sketch comedy, and other forms of entertainment. The genre emerged during the Fascist era, as a consequence of the promulgation of "modernist" laws that granted tax relief advantages to the theatres that were adapted to play movies. As a consequence, theatre companies were forced to devise a light and short form of representation that could be performed on the stage to entertain the audience before the "main show" (i.e., the movie).

Since avanspettacolo began as a low-profile and minor adaptation of revue proper, and in the 1970s ended up including such things as striptease shows, the term is sometimes used in a pejorative sense to refer to cheap, low quality comedy. Nevertheless, in the first half of the 20th century avanspettacolo served as a springboard for many prominent comedians, including Eduardo De Filippo,Totò, Aldo Fabrizi, and Lino Banfi.
