= A forza di sberle =

- Directed by: Bruno Corbucci
- Starring: Don Backy; George Eastman
- Release date: 1974
- Countries: Italy, Turkey
- Language: Italian

A forza di sberle is a 1974 action comedy film directed by Bruno Corbucci. The original Italian version is considered lost, however a Turkish dubbed version has been preserved.

== Critical response ==
A review in the Corriere della Sera praises the fact that the film does not take itself too seriously but regrets its lack of imagination.
