= Appuntamento a Ischia =

1960 film

- Film poster
- Directed by: Mario Mattoli
- Written by: Roberto Gianviti; Vittorio Metz
- Starring: Domenico Modugno; Antonella Lualdi; Maria Letizia Gazzoni; Carlo Croccolo; Linda Christian
- Cinematography: Roberto Gerardi; Marco Scarpelli
- Edited by: Adriana Novelli
- Music by: Gianni Ferrio
- Release date: 1960
- Running time: 99 minutes
- Country: Italy
- Language: Italian

Appuntamento a Ischia is a 1960 Italian romantic comedy film directed by Mario Mattoli and starring Domenico Modugno.

== Cast ==
- Domenico Modugno as Mimmo
- Antonella Lualdi as Mirella Argente
- Maria Letizia Gazzoni as Letizia
- Carlo Croccolo as Carlette
- Paolo Ferrari: Paolo
- Mina: as herself
- Elsa Vazzoler: Anna
- Pietro De Vico: pianista
- Ugo D'Alessio: Antonio
- Linda Christian as Mercedes
- Yvette Masson as Veronique
- Franco Franchi as smuggler
- Ciccio Ingrassia as smuggler
- Pippo Franco as guitarist of Mina
- Franco Califano as Mimmo double bass player
- Alberto Talegalli as Direttore dello zoo
- Mario Castellani as Agente musicale
- Carlo Taranto as Gennarino
- Toni Ucci as man sitting at the bar table
- Mimo Billi as Maresciallo della Finanza (as Mimmo Billi)
