= Umberto D'Orsi =

Italian actor (1929–1976)

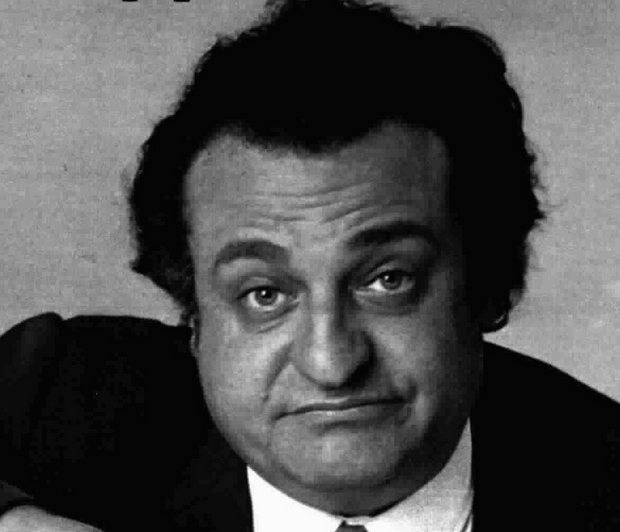
- Born: 30 July 1929; Trieste, Italy
- Died: 31 August 1976 (aged 47); Rome, Italy
- Occupation: Actor
- Years active: 1962-1976

Umberto D'Orsi (30 July 1929 – 31 August 1976) was an Italian character actor and comedian.

Born in Trieste, D'Orsi took a degree in law in 1953, but he was already active in theater from 1950, performing in small companies of prose and revue. From 1962 till his death, D'Orsi was a prolific supporting actor, appearing in as many as fifteen films a year. He died in Rome at 47 from kidney failure.

== Selected filmography ==
- A Girl... and a Million (1962)
- The Thursday (1963)
- The Girl from Parma (1963)
- The Hours of Love (1963)
- Shivers in Summer (1963)
- The Verona Trial (1963)
- Countersex (1964)
- Let's Talk About Women (1964)
- Me, Me, Me... and the Others (1965)
- I soldi (1965)
- Hot Frustrations (1965)
- I complessi (1965)
- Rita the American Girl (1965)
- Death Walks in Laredo (1966)
- Blockhead (1966)
- Golden Chameleon (1967)
- The Black Sheep (1968)
- The Two Crusaders (1968)
- Franco, Ciccio e il pirata Barbanera (1969)
- I See Naked (1969)
- Normal Young Man (1969)
- Circuito chiuso (1969)
- Basta guardarla (1970)
- La ragazza del prete (1970)
- I due maghi del pallone (1970)
- Ma che musica maestro (1971)
- Oasis of Fear (1971)
- Who Killed the Prosecutor and Why? (1972)
- My Name Is Shanghai Joe (1972)
- Ubalda, All Naked and Warm (1972)
- Return of Halleluja (1972)
- Naughty Nun (1972)
- Snow Job (1972)
- Man Called Invincible (1973)
- Holy God, Here Comes the Passatore! (1973)
- The Balloon Vendor (1974)
- L'arbitro (1974)
- The Sensual Man (1974)
- Strip First, Then We Talk (1975)
