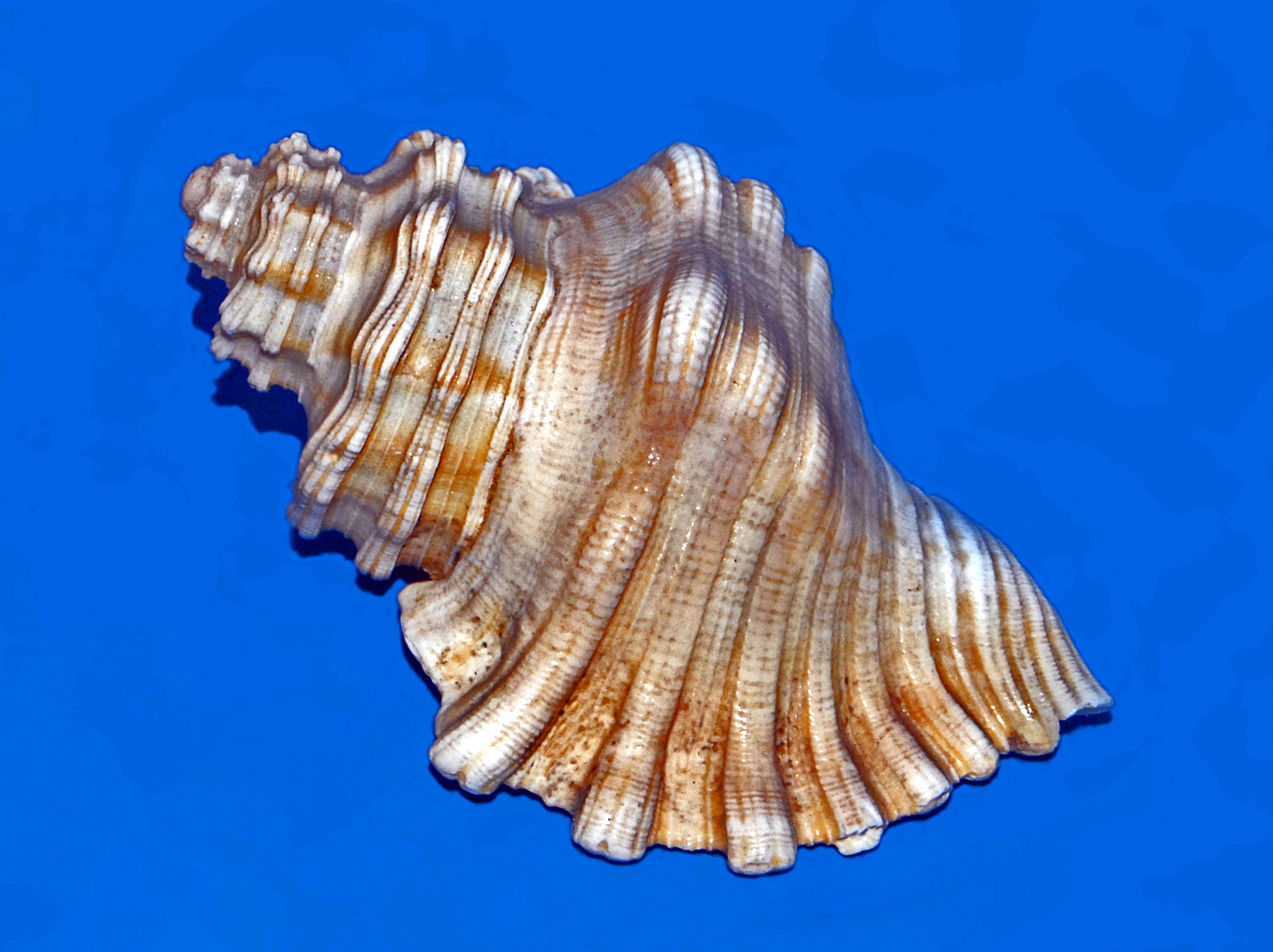
- Linatella caudata

Scientific classification
- Kingdom: Animalia
- Phylum: Mollusca
- Class: Gastropoda
- Subclass: Caenogastropoda
- Order: Littorinimorpha
- Family: Cymatiidae
- Genus: Linatella; Gray, 1857

Species
- Linatella caudata (Gmelin, 1791)

Synonyms
- Triton (Linatella) Gray, 1857

= Linatella =

Genus of gastropods

Linatella is a genus of sea snails known as predatory whelks, marine gastropod mollusks in the family Cymatiidae.

== Species ==
The only species within the genus Linatella is:

- Linatella caudata (Gmelin, 1791)

Species brought into synonymy

- Subgenus Linatella (Gelagna) Schaufuss, 1869 : synonym of Gelagna Schaufuss, 1869
- Linatella (Gelagna) pallida Parth, 1996 : synonym of Gelagna pallida (Parth, 1996)
- Linatella clandestina Lamarck : synonym of Gelagna succincta (Linnaeus, 1771)
- Linatella neptunia Garrard, 1963 : synonym of Linatella caudata (Gmelin, 1791)
- Linatella succincta (Linnaeus, 1771) : synonym of Gelagna succincta (Linnaeus, 1771)
