= 博士 =

博士 means "doctor" or "professor" in several languages. It may also refer to:

- Epaksa (이박사; 李博士; Born 1954), South Korean singer
- Hakase Mizuki (水月博士), Japanese manga artist
- Hakase Suidobashi (水道橋 博士; born 1962), Japanese comedian

== See also ==
- The dictionary definition of 博 at Wiktionary
- The dictionary definition of 士 at Wiktionary
- Boshi (disambiguation)
- Doctor (disambiguation)
- Professor (disambiguation)
