= Boschi =

Boschi is a surname. Notable people with the surname include:

- Alfonso Boschi (1615–1649), Italian painter of the Baroque period, active mainly in Florence
- Fabrizio Boschi (1572–1642), Italian painter of the early-Baroque period, active in Florence
- Francesca Vanini-Boschi (died 1744), Italian contralto singer of the 18th century
- Francesco Boschi (1619–1675), Italian painter of the Baroque period, active mainly in Florence
- Giovanni Carlo Boschi (1715–1788), Italian clergyman who was made a cardinal by Pope Clement XIII
- Giulia Boschi (born 1962), Italian film and television actress
- Giulio Boschi (1838–1920), Italian Cardinal of the Roman Catholic Church who served as Archbishop of Ferrara
- Giuseppe Maria Boschi (1698–1744), Italian bass singer
- Hélène Boschi (1917–1990), Franco-Swiss pianist, born in Lausanne
- Maria Elena Boschi (born 1981), Italian lawyer and politician

== See also ==
- Ancilla boschi, a species of sea snail, a marine gastropod mollusk
- Gymnothorax boschi, a marine fish of the family Muraenidae
- Leptomyrina boschi, a butterfly in the family Lycaenidae
- Nebria boschi, a metal coloured species of ground beetle
- Ranularia boschi, a species of predatory sea snail
- Boschi Sant'Anna, a commune with 1,346 inhabitants in the province of Verona
- Boshi (disambiguation)
