= Perception (TV series) =

American crime drama television series

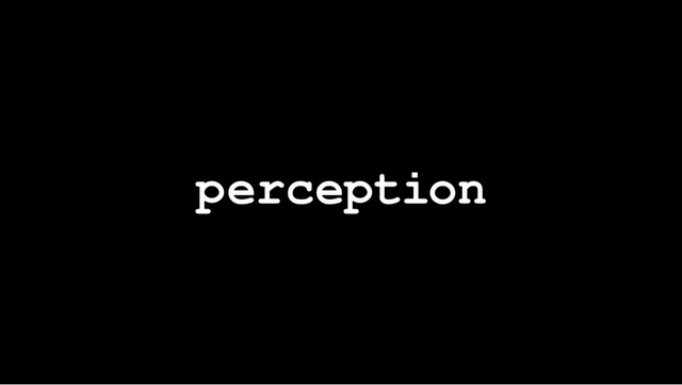
- Genre: Crime drama; Police procedural
- Created by: Kenneth Biller; Mike Sussman
- Starring: Eric McCormack; Rachael Leigh Cook; Kelly Rowan; Arjay Smith; LeVar Burton; Scott Wolf
- Theme music composer: Tree Adams
- Composer: Tree Adams
- Country of origin: United States
- Original language: English
- No. of seasons: 3
- No. of episodes: 39 (list of episodes)

Production
- Executive producers: Kenneth Biller; Mike Sussman; Alan Poul
- Producer: Eric McCormack
- Running time: 43 minutes
- Production companies: Paperboy Productions; ABC Studios

Original release
- Network: TNT
- Release: July 9, 2012 – March 17, 2015

Perception is an American crime drama television series created by Kenneth Biller and Mike Sussman. The series stars Eric McCormack as Daniel Pierce, a neuropsychiatrist with schizophrenia who assists the FBI on some of its most complex cases.

The series aired in the United States on the cable channel TNT from July 9, 2012, to March 17, 2015, and was produced by ABC Studios. Broadcast of the third season was halted in August 2014, after its 10th episode, and officially cancelled on November 13, 2014. The remaining five episodes of season 3 began airing February 17, 2015.

== Overview ==
Daniel Pierce, a talented but eccentric neuropsychiatrist, is enlisted by the FBI to assist in solving some of its most complex cases in Chicago. Pierce works closely with Special Agent Kate Moretti, a former student who recruited him to work with the FBI. Also on the team are Max Lewicki, Pierce's teaching assistant, and Natalie Vincent, a hallucination manifested as a result of his schizophrenia who also serves as his best friend.

Episodes typically begin with a scene of Pierce giving a lecture to his students about an aspect of the human brain that becomes significant within the plot of the episode. The episodes also typically end with observations said to students about the paradoxes of human perception.

== Episodes ==
Season	Episodes	Originally released	
Season	Episodes	First released	Last released
1	10	July 9, 2012	September 17, 2012
2	14	June 25, 2013	March 18, 2014
3	15	June 17, 2014	March 17, 2015

== Cast and characters ==
=== Main ===
- Eric McCormack as Daniel J. Pierce, a neuropsychiatrist and Davenport Award–winning neuroscience professor at the (fictional) Chicago Lake Michigan University (CLMU), who is enlisted by the FBI as an expert consultant to assist on some of their most complex cases. Pierce's interest in neuroscience stems from his own long history of paranoid schizophrenia. His hallucinations sometimes enable him to pick out subtle clues in solving crimes. In the season 2 finale, Pierce quits CLMU after realizing that the faculty cares more about the school's image and benefactors than its education and moves to Paris.
- Rachael Leigh Cook as Special Agent Katherine Rose "Kate" Moretti, Pierce's former student and the FBI agent who recruited him. Kate has a "tendency to go beyond the scope of the assigned investigation", which cost her a position in Washington, D.C. and caused her demotion back to Chicago. She had a crush on Pierce during her college years and is his most trusting ally. She and Donnie remarry in the final episode.
- Arjay Smith as Max Lewicki, Pierce's live-in teaching assistant, who helps him differentiate between real people and his schizophrenia-induced hallucinations. It is later revealed in the season 1 episode "Nemesis" that the two met when Lewicki was working as an orderly at the same psychiatric hospital in which Pierce had been confined for his mental illness. Pierce then asked Lewicki to come with him to Chicago on the promise of a teaching assistantship to help Max finish graduate school.
- Kelly Rowan as Natalie Vincent, Pierce's imaginary best friend and adviser, who he realizes is based on someone he once saw at a college party in Michigan. Rowan also plays Caroline Newsome, Pierce's psychiatrist and the physical basis for Natalie.
- LeVar Burton as Paul Haley, a professor of cultural anthropology and Pierce's dean at CLMU. He and Pierce have been close friends since they were roommates in college.
- Scott Wolf as Assistant U.S. Attorney Donald "Donnie" Ryan (recurring season 2, regular season 3), Kate's ex-husband, who cheated on Kate with her best friend. He has recently transferred back to Chicago in an attempt to re-ignite his relationship with Kate.

=== Recurring ===
- Jonathan Scarfe as FBI Agent Roger Probert, Kate's former work partner, who is very cynical about Pierce's judgments.
- Brad Rowe as FBI Agent Bobby Dalton, Kate's current work partner.
- Dan Lauria as Joe Moretti, Kate's widowed father, a retired CPD homicide detective who now runs a bar in Chicago.
- Shane Coffey as the young Daniel "DJ" Pierce, before he was diagnosed with paranoid schizophrenia.
- Peter Coyote as James Alan Pierce, Daniel's wealthy but estranged father, who has Alzheimer's disease.
- JoBeth Williams as Margaret Pierce, Daniel's late mother, who died from cancer 25 years earlier, but reappears in Daniel's hallucinations.
- Perrey Reeves as Miranda Stiles, Daniel's first love whom he broke up with so she could go study music.
- Jamie Bamber as Michael Hathaway, a handsome hotshot behavioral science professor newly recruited at CLMU, for whom Pierce has little respect. He is romantically interested in Kate.
- Brooke Nevin as Shelby Coulson, a member of the Great Lakes Leadership Committee who lobbies for Donnie to run campaign for alderman.
- Christopher Gartin as Father Pat, a childhood friend of Kate and the pastor at her local Catholic church, who helps to annul Kate and Donny's previous marriage so they can legitimately remarry.

== Production ==
=== Conception and development ===
Originally known as "Proof", Perception was created by Kenneth Biller and Mike Sussman and appeared on TNT's development slate as early as 2009. On September 8, 2010, after having been in development for well over a year, TNT placed a pilot order for Perception. Kenneth Biller and Mike Sussman wrote the pilot, Alan Poul was attached to the project as director, with Kenneth Biller, Mike Sussman and Alan Poul serving as executive producers. Neuroscientist David Eagleman served as the technical consultant to the series.

On March 22, 2011, TNT green-lit the series with an order of 10 episodes to air in the summer of 2012. Along with the series pickup, TNT announced that Alan Poul would not be continuing as an executive producer on the series beyond the pilot; they also announced that the character portrayed by McCormack had been renamed Daniel Pierce.

On August 17, 2011, TNT announced that production had commenced on the remaining nine episodes of Perception. The series is produced by ABC Studios.

On November 13, 2014, TNT announced that it was cancelling the show after three seasons.

=== Casting ===
The cast of Perception: (l–r) Rachael Leigh Cook, Eric McCormack, Arjay Smith and Kelly Rowan

Casting announcements began in October 2010, with Eric McCormack first to be cast, McCormack portrays Geoffrey (later renamed Daniel) Pierce, "an eccentric neuroscientist who uses his unique outlook to help the federal government solve complex cases. With an intimate knowledge of human behavior and a masterful understanding of the mind, this quirky, crime-solving professor pulls lessons from an odd and imaginative view of the world." Next to join the series was Arjay Smith as Max Lewicki, "Pierce's teaching assistant, a perpetual student who has spent nine years in college and has had sixteen majors and not a single degree. His primary job is to keep Pierce in line and on task." Rachael Leigh Cook was next to be cast as Kate Rossi, "Pierce’s former student and the person responsible for recruiting him to work for the government." Kelly Rowan was the last actor to be cast, portraying Natalie Vincent, "Pierce’s best friend and every bit his intellectual equal."

Along with the announcement that production had started on the series, the network announced that Levar Burton had joined the series as a recurring guest star; he portrays Paul Haley, "a dean at the university". TNT also announced that the character portrayed by Cook had been renamed Kate Moretti.

On August 22, 2011, it was announced that Jamie Bamber had been cast in a recurring role as "a new professor who catches the eye of Kate Moretti". On October 14, 2011, TNT Public Relations announced that Freddy Rodriguez was cast in a two-episode role as "an eccentric ex-student of McCormack's Dr. Daniel Pierce".

On January 29, 2013, Scott Wolf joined the series in the major recurring role of Donnie, Kate's ex-husband who works as an Assistant U.S. Attorney. On February 13, 2014, Peter Coyote signed onto the season three guest role of James Alan Pierce, Daniel's father.

=== Filming ===
Although the series is set in Chicago, Illinois, filming for the pilot took place in Toronto, Ontario, Canada. Afterwards, filming was shifted to Los Angeles, California.

== Broadcast ==
Perception premiered on TVB Pearl in Hong Kong on September 11, 2012. In the United Kingdom and Ireland, the series premiered on Watch on October 3, 2012. The second season debuted on September 3, 2013. In South Africa, it began airing on DStv on November 5, 2012. In India, it started airing on Zee Café on January 19, 2013. In Australia, Universal Channel premiered it on April 3, 2013. The third season premiered on January 5, 2015. TVNZ in New Zealand debuted the show on January 22, 2014.

== Home media ==
On May 21, 2013, the complete first season was released on DVD. The series is also available for streaming on Amazon.com, Disney+ Star, iTunes, and American Broadcasting Company's streaming service.

Name	Region 1	Region 2	Region 4	Discs
Perception: The Complete First Season	May 21, 2013	—N/a	—N/a	2

== See also ==
- Monk (TV series)
- Professor T., two series with a similar premise
- River (TV series)
