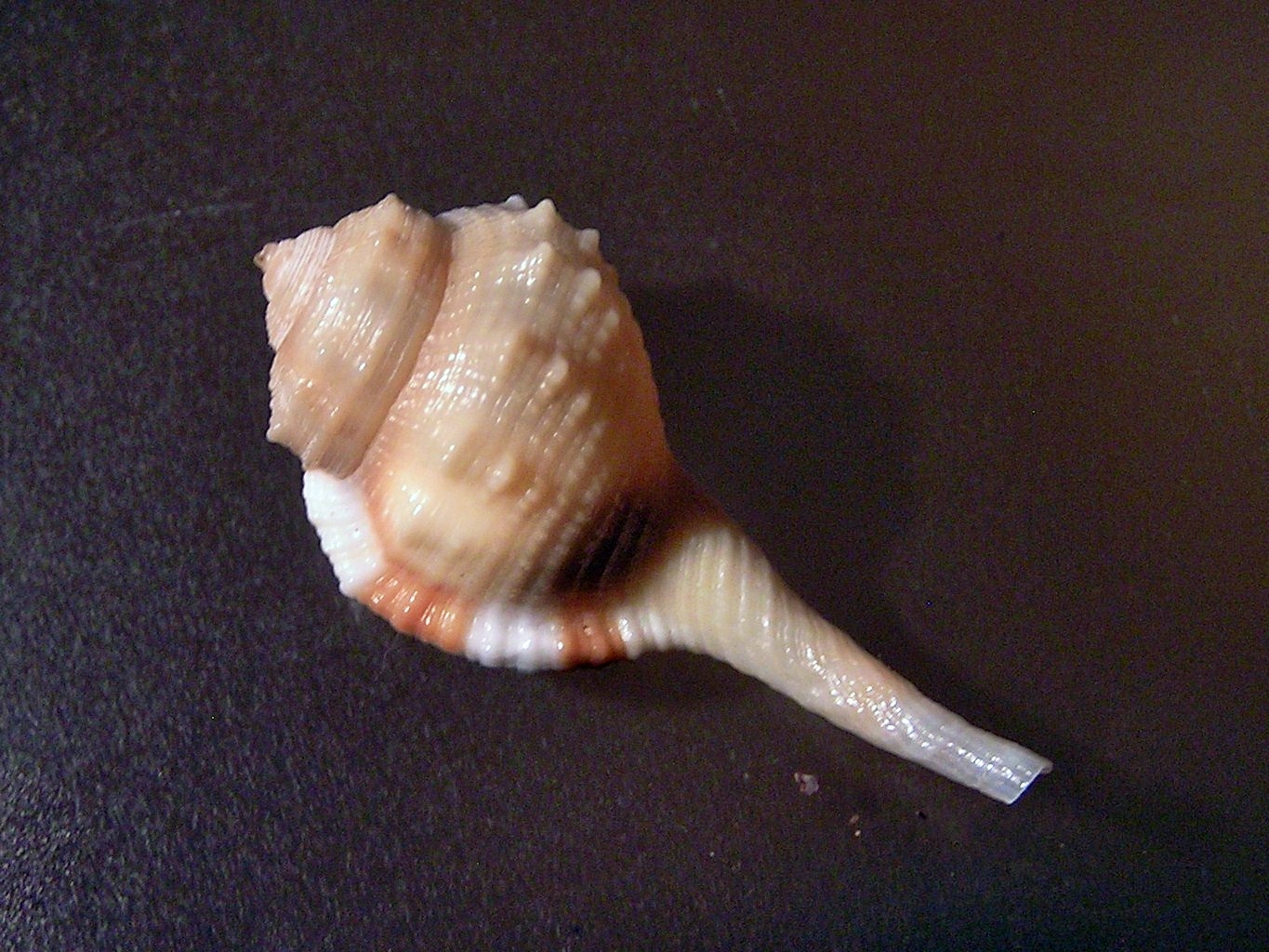
- Shell of Ranularia oblita

Scientific classification
- Kingdom: Animalia
- Phylum: Mollusca
- Class: Gastropoda
- Subclass: Caenogastropoda
- Order: Littorinimorpha
- Superfamily: Tonnoidea
- Family: Cymatiidae
- Genus: Ranularia; Schumacher, 1817

Type species
- Murex clavator Dillwyn, 1817

Synonyms
- Cymatium (Ranularia) Schumacher, 1817; Retusum Jousseaume, 1892; Tritonium (Ranularia) Schumacher, 1817; Tritonocauda Dall, 1904

= Ranularia =

Genus of gastropods

Ranularia is a genus of predatory sea snails, marine gastropod mollusks in the family Cymatiidae.

== Species ==
Species within the genus Ranularia include:

- Ranularia andamanensis (Beu, 1987)
- Ranularia arthuri (Beu, 1987)
- Ranularia boschi (Abbott & Lewis, 1970)
- Ranularia caudata (Gmelin, 1791)
- Ranularia cynocephala (Lamarck, 1816)
- Ranularia dunkeri (Lischke, 1868)
- Ranularia encaustica (Reeve, 1844)
- Ranularia exilis (Reeve, 1844)
- Ranularia gallinago (Reeve, 1844)
- Ranularia gutturnia (Röding, 1798)
- Ranularia monilifera (A. Adams & Reeve, 1850)
- Ranularia oblita Lewis & Beu, 1976
- Ranularia oboesa (Perry, 1811)
- Ranularia parthi (Arthur, 1991)
- Ranularia pyrulum (A. Adams & Reeve, 1850)
- Ranularia pyrum (Linnaeus, 1758)
- Ranularia rehderi (A.H. Verrill, 1950)
- Ranularia sarcostoma (Reeve, 1844)
- Ranularia sinensis (Reeve, 1844)
- Ranularia springsteeni (Beu, 1987)
- Ranularia testudinaria (A. Adams & Reeve, 1850)
- Ranularia trilineata (Reeve, 1844)
- Ranularia tripa (Lamarck, 1822)

Synonyms

- Ranularia (Lagena) Mörch, 1852: synonym of Gelagna Schaufuss, 1869 (Invalid: junior homonym of Lagena Röding, 1798 and Lagena Schumacher, 1817; Gelagna and Paralagena are replacement names)
- Ranularia clavator (Dillwyn, 1817): synonym of Ranularia gutturnia (Röding, 1798)
- Ranularia labiata Schumacher, 1817: synonym of Ranularia gutturnia (Röding, 1798)
- Ranularia longirostra Schumacher, 1817: synonym of Ranularia gutturnia (Röding, 1798)
- Ranularia muricina (Röding, 1798): synonym of Gutturnium muricinum (Röding, 1798)
- Ranularia retusa (Lamarck, 1822): synonym of Ranularia oboesa (Perry, 1811)
- Ranularia tuberosus (Lamarck, 1822): synonym of Gutturnium muricinum (Röding, 1798)
