= Ch-Ch-Changes =

Ch-Ch-Changes, or similar, may refer to:

- "Ch-Ch-Changes" (CSI: Crime Scene Investigation), a 2004 television episode
- "Ch-Ch-Changes" (Perception), a 2013 television episode
- "Ch-Ch-Changes" (Popular), a 2000 television episode
- "Ch-Ch-Changes" (Roswell), a 2002 television episode
- "Ch... Ch... Ch... Changes", a 1999 episode of Dawson's Creek
- "Ch-Ch-Ch-Ch-Changes", a 2007 episode of Friday Night Lights

== See also ==
- "Changes" (David Bowie song), in which the phrase appears
