= El Profesor =

El Profesor may refer to:

- El Profesor (character), or Sergio Marquina, a character in Money Heist (original title La casa de papel), a Spanish heist television series
- El Profesor (politician), a nickname of Carlos Hank González, Mexican politician

== See also ==
- Professor (disambiguation)
