= I Kill, You Kill =

Io uccido, tu uccidi
- Directed by: Gianni Puccini
- Written by: Boschi, Ennio De Concini
- Cinematography: Marcello Gatti
- Release date: 1965
- Country: Italy
- Language: Italian

I Kill, You Kill or Io uccido, tu uccidi is a 1965 Italian comedy film directed by Gianni Puccini starring the comic duo Franco and Ciccio.

== Cast ==
- Franco Franchi as Franco (segment "Cavalleria Rusticana, oggi")
- Ciccio Ingrassia as Turiddu (segment "Cavalleria Rusticana, oggi")
- Franca Polesello as Lola - Franco's Wife (segment "Cavalleria Rusticana, oggi")
- Rosalba Neri as Turiddu's Wife (segment "Cavalleria Rusticana, oggi")
- Enrico Viarisio as (segment "La danza delle ore")
- Paolo Panelli as (segment "La danza delle ore")
- Margaret Lee as (segment "La danza delle ore")
- Daniela Igliozzi as (segment "La danza delle ore")
- Mario Siletti as (segment "La danza delle ore")
- Eugenio Cappabianca as (segment "La danza delle ore")
- Emmanuelle Riva as (segment "La donna che viveva sola")
- Jean-Louis Trintignant as (segment "La donna che viveva sola")
- Dominique Boschero as (segment "La donna che viveva sola")
- Stella Monclar as (segment "La donna che viveva sola")
- Mario Colli as (segment "La donna che viveva sola")
