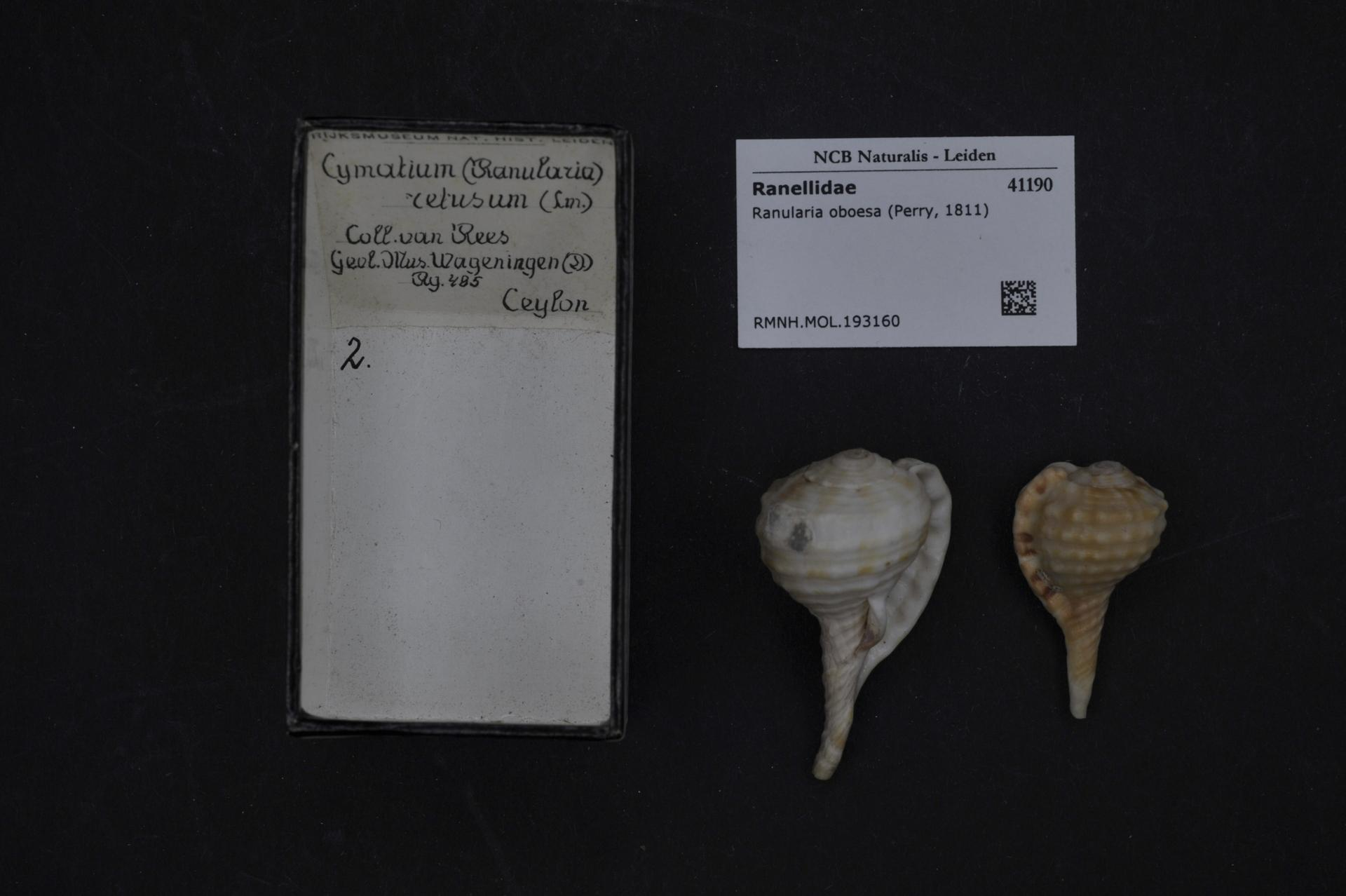

Scientific classification
- Kingdom: Animalia
- Phylum: Mollusca
- Class: Gastropoda
- Subclass: Caenogastropoda
- Order: Littorinimorpha
- Family: Cymatiidae
- Genus: Ranularia
- Species: R. oboesa

Binomial name
- Ranularia oboesa (Perry, 1811)

Synonyms
- Monoplex oboesa Perry, 1811; Ranularia retusa (Lamarck, 1822); Triton retusum Lamarck, 1822

= Ranularia oboesa =

Species of gastropod

Ranularia oboesa is a species of predatory sea snail, a marine gastropod mollusk in the family Cymatiidae.
