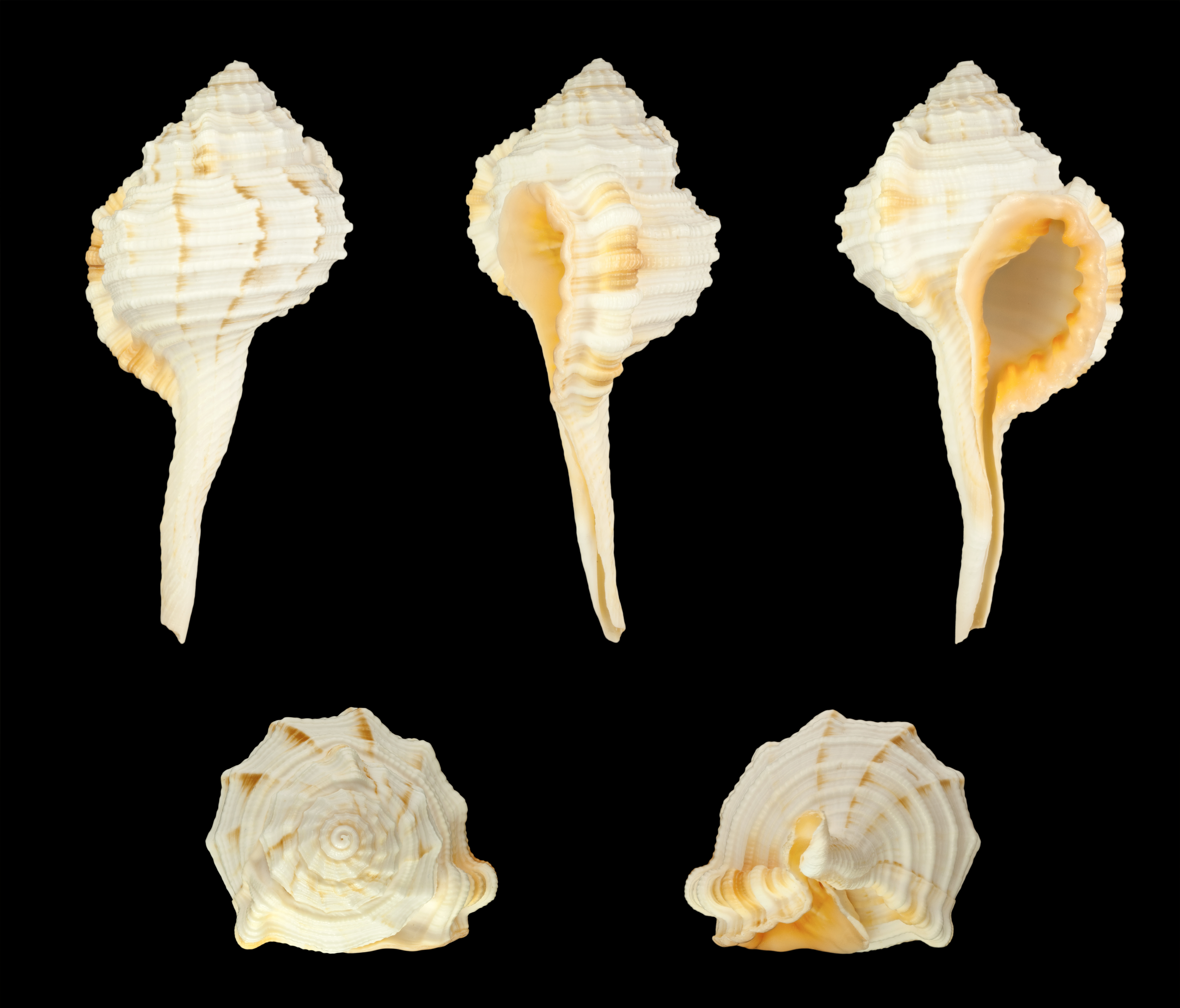
- Ranularia gutturnia (Röding, 1798)

Scientific classification
- Kingdom: Animalia
- Phylum: Mollusca
- Class: Gastropoda
- Subclass: Caenogastropoda
- Order: Littorinimorpha
- Family: Cymatiidae
- Genus: Ranularia
- Species: R. gutturnia

Binomial name
- Ranularia gutturnia (Röding, 1798)

Synonyms
- Monoplex formosus Perry, 1811; Murex clavator Dillwyn, 1817; Ranularia clavator (Dillwyn, 1817); Ranularia labiata Schumacher, 1817; Ranularia longirostra Schumacher, 1817; Tritonium macrourum Link, 1807; Tudicla gutturnia Röding, 1798

= Ranularia gutturnia =

Species of gastropod

Ranularia gutturnia is a species of predatory sea snail, a marine gastropod mollusk in the family Cymatiidae.
