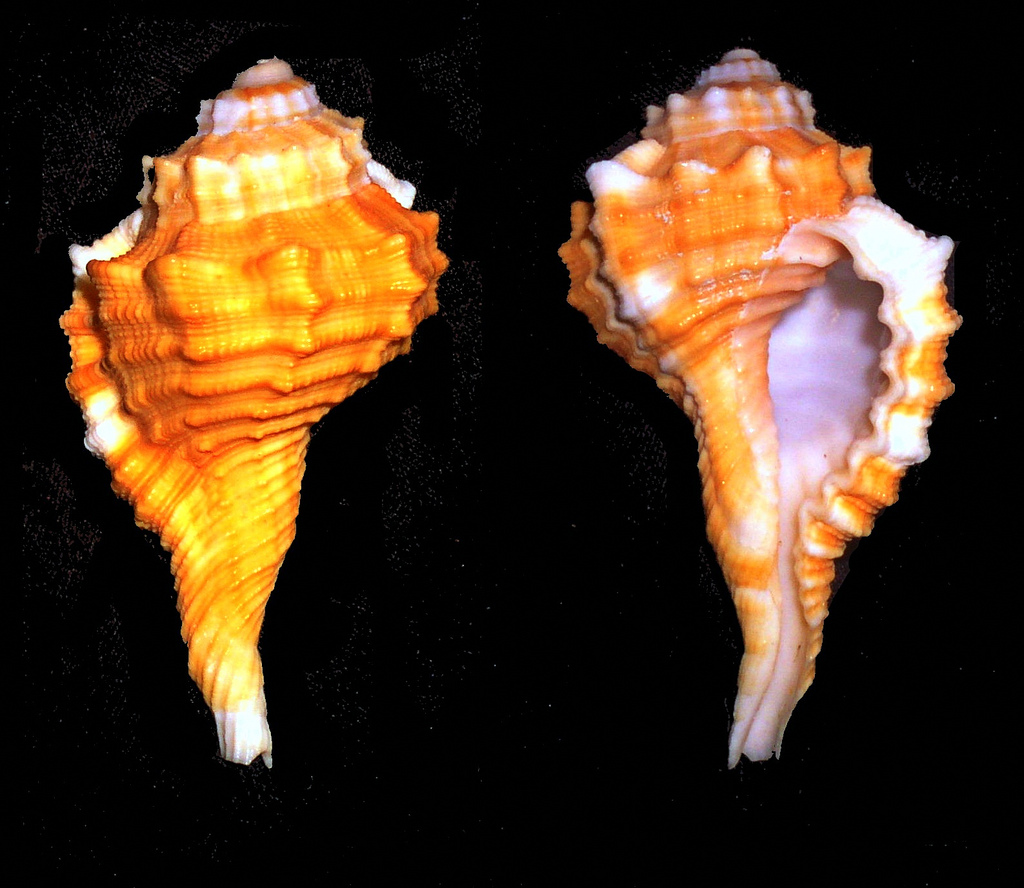

Scientific classification
- Kingdom: Animalia
- Phylum: Mollusca
- Class: Gastropoda
- Subclass: Caenogastropoda
- Order: Littorinimorpha
- Superfamily: Tonnoidea
- Family: Cymatiidae
- Genus: Ranularia
- Species: R. sarcostoma

Binomial name
- Ranularia sarcostoma (Reeve, 1844)

Synonyms
- Cymatium sarcostomum (Reeve, 1844); Triton sarcostoma Reeve, 1844

= Ranularia sarcostoma =

Species of gastropod

Ranularia sarcostoma, the flesh-coloured hairy triton, is a species of predatory sea snail, a marine gastropod mollusk in the family Cymatiidae.

This species was originally described by Reeve in 1844 as Cymatium (Ranularia) sarcostoma.

The generic placement is doubtful.

== Description ==
The shell size varies between 50 mm and 103 mm. Some specimens have been recorded with specific measurements: A shell from the Philippines measured 71 mm in length, and another in Phuket, Thailand measured 55.61 mm.

== Distribution ==
This species is found in the Indian Ocean in the Mascarene Basin and in the Indo-West Pacific. Specific locations where specimens have been collected or observed include the Philippines and Thailand.
