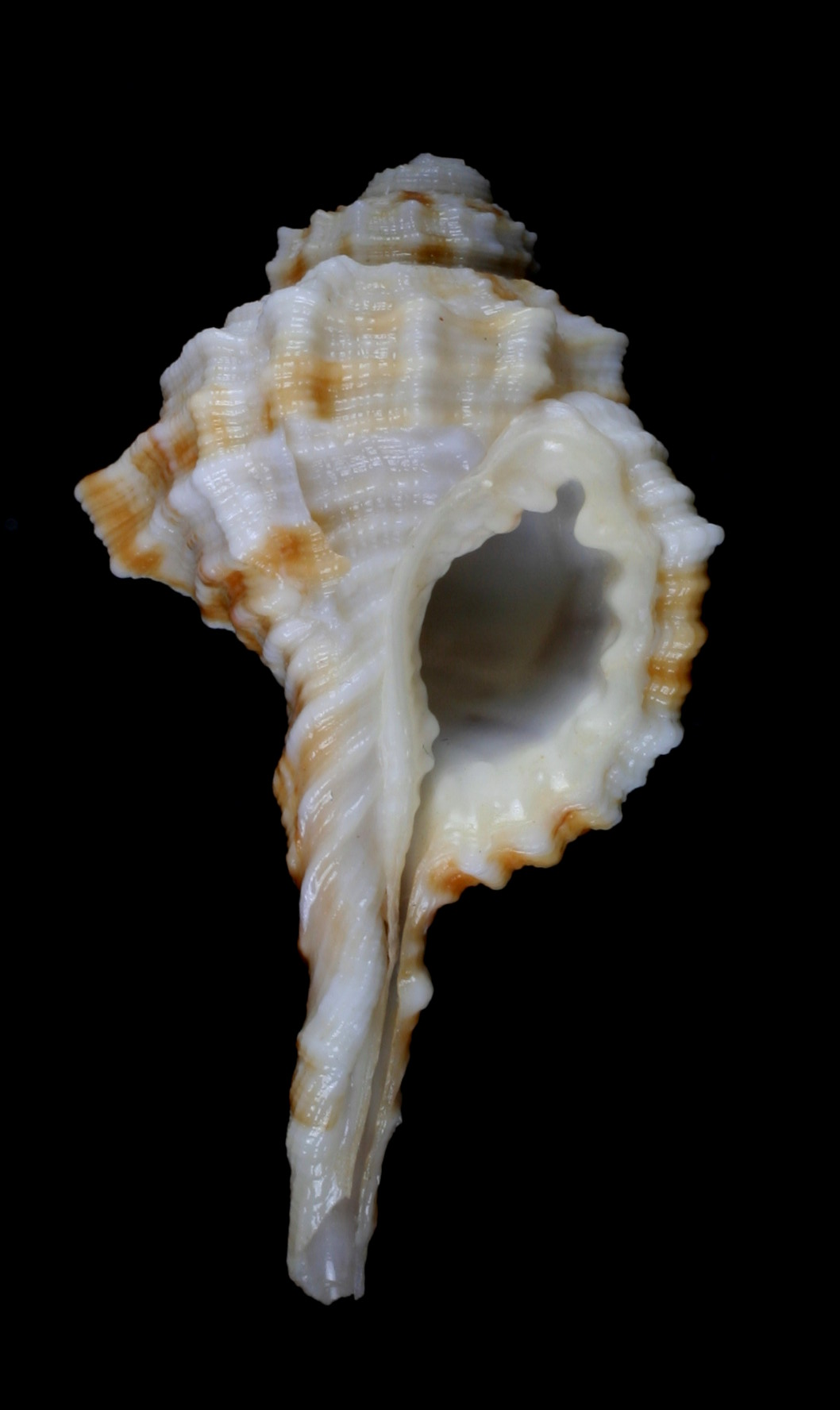
- Apertural view of Ranularia exilis (Reeve, 1844)
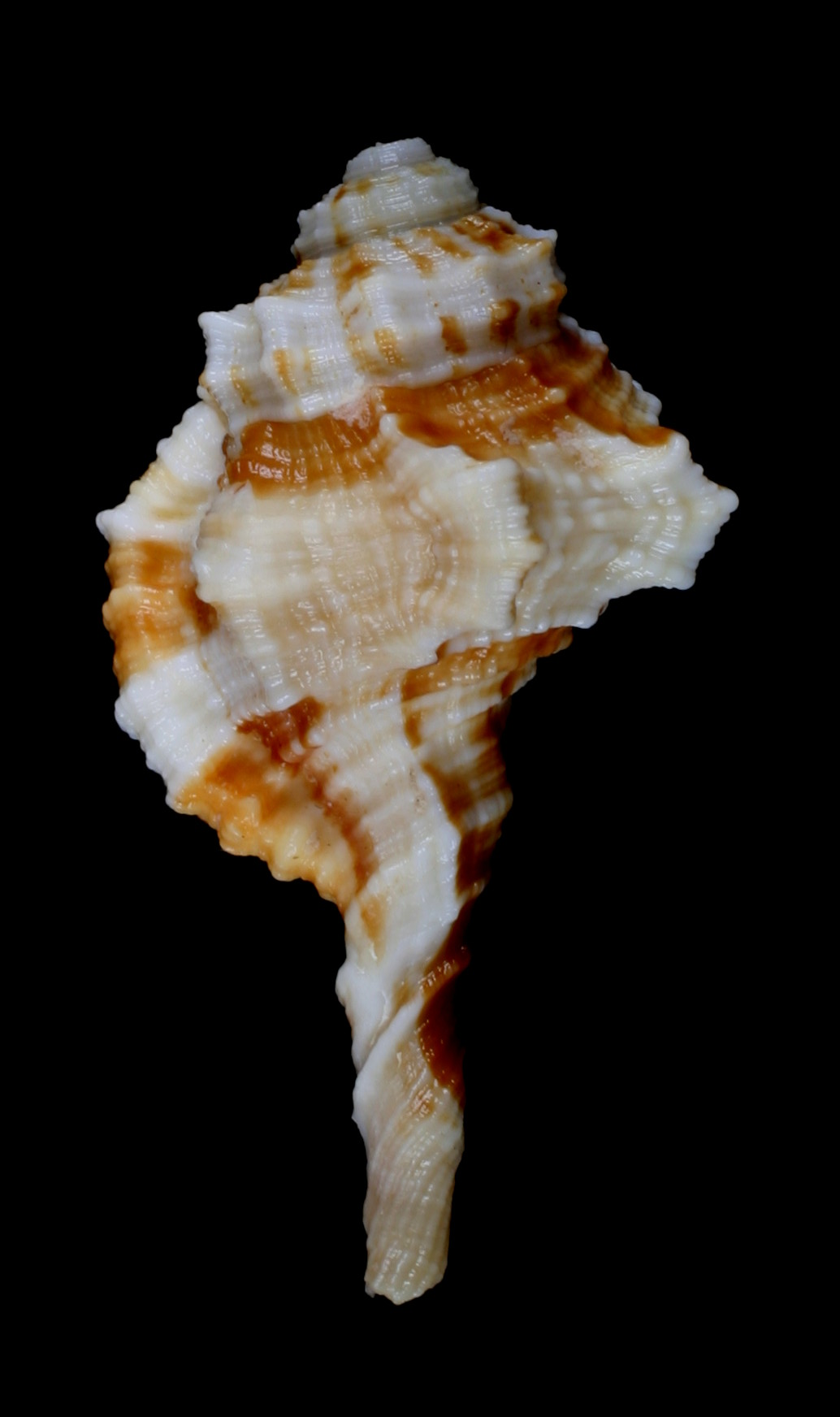
- Abapertural view

Scientific classification
- Kingdom: Animalia
- Phylum: Mollusca
- Class: Gastropoda
- Subclass: Caenogastropoda
- Order: Littorinimorpha
- Family: Cymatiidae
- Genus: Ranularia
- Species: R. exilis

Binomial name
- Ranularia exilis (Reeve, 1844)

Synonyms
- Triton exilis Reeve, 1844 (basionym); Cymatium exile; Cymatium (Ranularia) exile (Reeve, L.A., 1844)

= Ranularia exilis =

Species of gastropod

Ranularia exilis, the slender triton, is a species of predatory sea snail, a marine gastropod mollusk in the family Cymatiidae.

== Description ==
The shell size varies between 40 mm and 60 mm.

== Distribution ==
This species is distributed in the Red Sea and the West Pacific Ocean.
