= Ranularia pyrulum =

Scientific classification
- Kingdom: Animalia
- Phylum: Mollusca
- Class: Gastropoda
- Subclass: Caenogastropoda
- Order: Littorinimorpha
- Family: Cymatiidae
- Genus: Ranularia
- Species: R. pyrulum

Binomial name
- Ranularia pyrulum (A. Adams & Reeve, 1850)

Synonyms
- Cymatium (Ranularia) fortespirale Parth, 1993; Triton pyrulum A. Adams & Reeve, 1850

Species of gastropod

Ranularia pyrulum is a species of predatory sea snail, a marine gastropod mollusk in the family Cymatiidae.
