= Ranularia andamanensis =

Scientific classification
- Kingdom: Animalia
- Phylum: Mollusca
- Class: Gastropoda
- Subclass: Caenogastropoda
- Order: Littorinimorpha
- Family: Cymatiidae
- Genus: Ranularia
- Species: R. andamanensis

Binomial name
- Ranularia andamanensis (Beu, 1987)

Synonyms
- Cymatium (Ranularia) andamanensis Beu, 1987

Species of gastropod

Ranularia andamanensis is a species of predatory sea snail, a marine gastropod mollusk in the family Cymatiidae.
