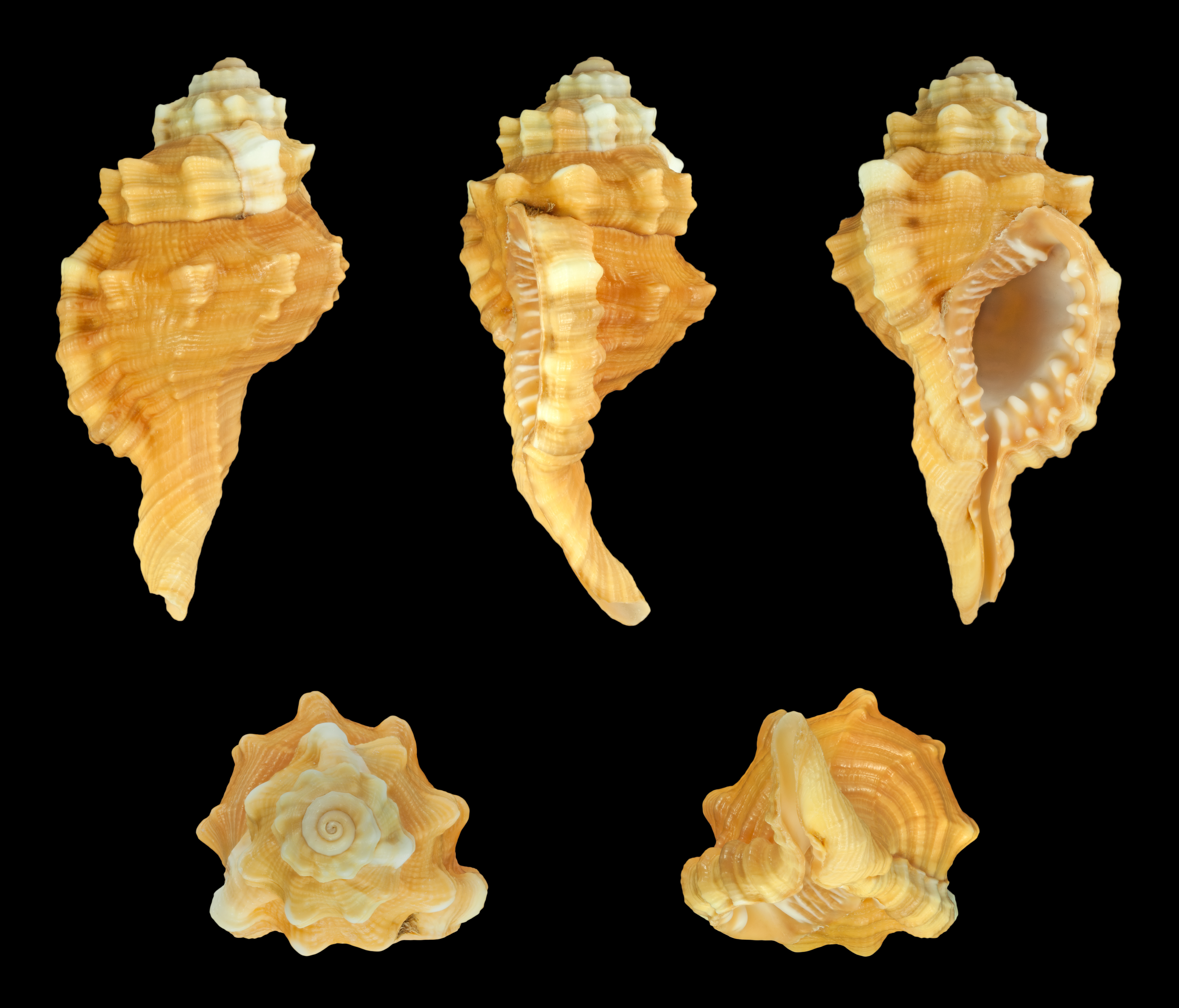
- Ranularia pyrum (Linnaeus, 1758)

Scientific classification
- Kingdom: Animalia
- Phylum: Mollusca
- Class: Gastropoda
- Subclass: Caenogastropoda
- Order: Littorinimorpha
- Family: Cymatiidae
- Genus: Ranularia
- Species: R. pyrum

Binomial name
- Ranularia pyrum (Linnaeus, 1758)

Synonyms
- Murex pyrum Linnaeus, 1758 (basionym); Cymatium pyrum (Linnaeus, 1758); Cymatium (Ranularia) pyrum (Linnaeus, 1758); Cymatium canaliculatum Röding, P.F., 1798; Cymatium clavatum Röding, P.F., 1798; Cymatium flexuosum Röding, P.F., 1798; Cymatium muricatum Röding, P.F., 1798

= Ranularia pyrum =

Species of gastropod

Ranularia pyrum, commonly known as the pear triton, is a species of predatory sea snail, a marine gastropod mollusk in the family Cymatiidae.

== Description ==
The shell size varies between 50 mm and 130 mm.

== Distribution ==
This species occurs in the Red Sea, the Indian Ocean off Chagos and the Mascarene Basin, and the Indo-West Pacific.
