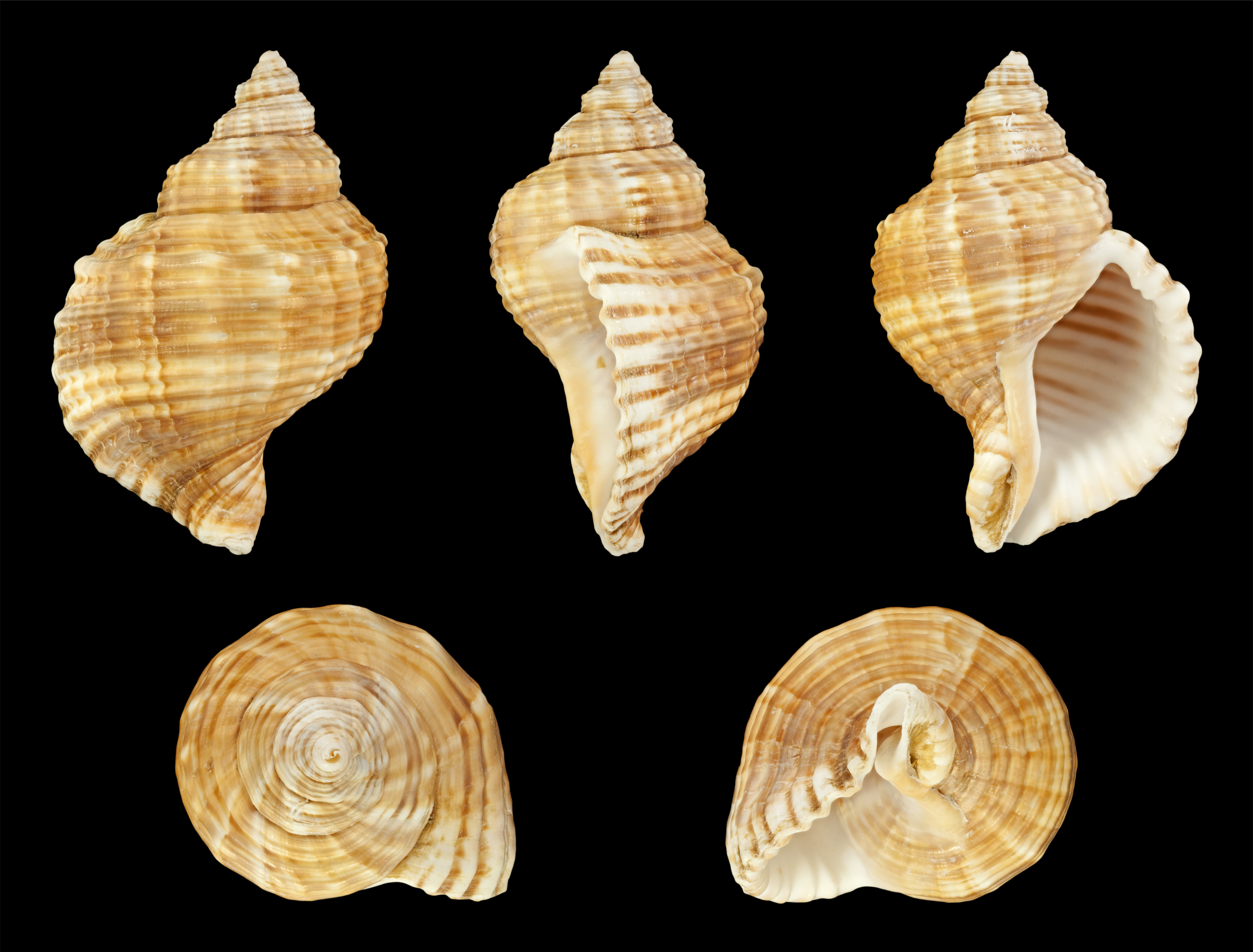
- Linatella caudata

Scientific classification
- Kingdom: Animalia
- Phylum: Mollusca
- Class: Gastropoda
- Subclass: Caenogastropoda
- Order: Littorinimorpha
- Family: Cymatiidae
- Genus: Linatella
- Species: L. caudata

Binomial name
- Linatella caudata (Gmelin, 1791)

Synonyms
- Buccinum caudatum Gmelin, 1791 (basionym); Cassidaria cingulata Lamarck, 1822; Cymatium (Linatella) cingulatum (Lamarck, 1822); Cymatium (Linatella) cingulatum peninsulum M. Smith, 1937; Cymatium (Linatella) poulsenii Mörch, O.A.L., 1877; Cymatium cingulatum (Lamarck, 1822); Cymatium cutaceum (Lamarck, 1816); Dolium losareinse Martin, 1899 †; Fusus cutaceus Lamarck, 1816; Fusus voigtii Anton, 1838; Linatella cingulatum (Gmelin, 1791); Linatella neptunia Garrard, 1963; Ranularia (Lagena) rostratus “Martini” Mörch, 1853; Triton (Linatella) poulsenii Mörch, 1877; Triton undosum Kiener, 1842; Tritonium caudatum (Gmelin, 1791)

= Linatella caudata =

Species of gastropod

Linatella caudata, the Girdled triton or Poulsen's Triton, is a species of predatory sea snail, a marine gastropod mollusk in the family Cymatiidae.

== Distribution ==
This species is very widespread (but uncommon). It is present in European waters, in the Mediterraneal Sea, in the Western Atlantic from South Carolina to Brazil, in the Canary Islands, Cape Verde, in the Red Sea and in the Indian Ocean along Tanzania and in the Indo-West Pacific as far north as southern Japan.

== Habitat ==
These sea snails are usually found in seagrass meadows. They live only on soft substrates on the shelf at depths of 20 to 200 m.

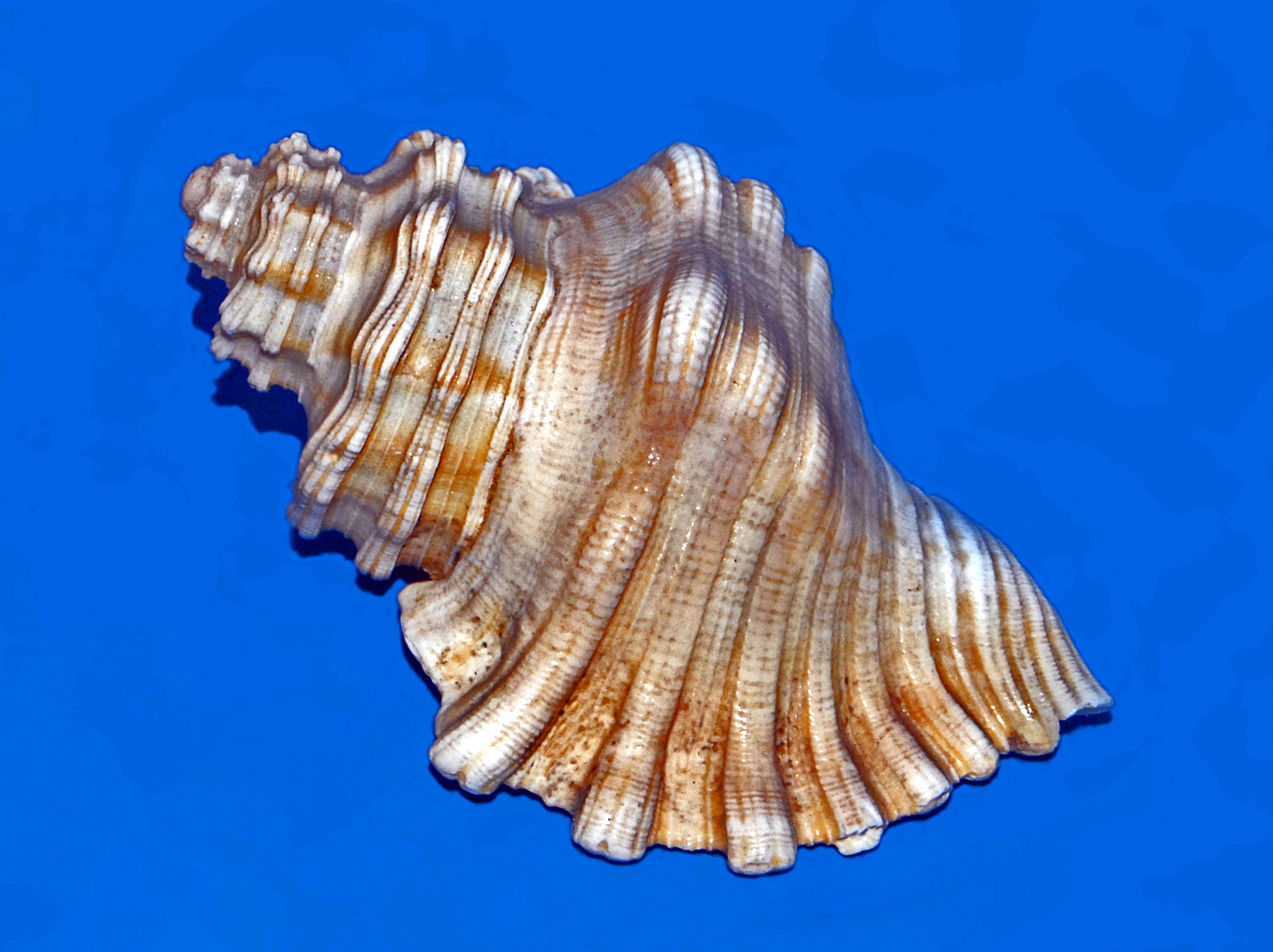
A shell of Linatella caudata from Sicily, on display at the Museo Civico di Storia Naturale di Milano

== Description ==
The size of an adult shell varies between 35 mm and 100 mm. These medium-sized shells are extremely variable in size, thickness, prominence, quantity of flare of the outer lip and thickness and width of the inner lip. Also very variable are the spire height and the intensity of the surface coloration. Commonly they have a hairy appearance and are solid and thick and show a Tonna-like form and moderately tall spire, with a very weak sculpture of low, weakly convex surfaced, spiral cords. The whorls are weak shouldered. They lack obvious varices or only the terminal varix is developed. The outer lip is flared and slightly thickened, with weakly shouldered whorls. The anterior siphonal canal is moderately long.

The interior of outer lip flare has sixteen low transverse ridges. The exterior surface of the shell varies between cream to pale yellowish-brown, with irregular, narrow light and darker bands. The body of these sea snails are brownish with black spots.

== Biology ==
These sea snails have been reported as feeding on Fan Shells (Pinna bicolor) and on the pearl oyster (Pinctada imbricata). Consequently, they are considered a serious problem for the aquaculture of marine bivalves.

== Bibliography ==
- Bouchet, P.; Gofas, S. (2015). Cymatium cutaceum (Lamarck, 1816).
- Gofas, S.; Le Renard, J.; Bouchet, P. (2001). Mollusca, in: Costello, M.J. et al. (Ed.) (2001). European register of marine species: a check-list of the marine species in Europe and a bibliography of guides to their identification. Collection Patrimoines Naturels, 50: pp. 180–213
- Rolán E., 2005. Malacological Fauna From The Cape Verde Archipelago. Part 1, Polyplacophora and Gastropoda.
- Spry, J.F. (1961). The sea shells of Dar es Salaam: Gastropods. Tanganyika Notes and Records 56
- Turgeon, D. D., A. E. Bogan, E. V. Coan, W. K. Emerson, W. G. Lyons, W. Pratt, et al. (1988) Common and scientific names of aquatic invertebrates from the United States and Canada: mollusks, American Fisheries Society Special Publication 16
- Turgeon, D. D., J. F. Quinn, Jr., A. E. Bogan, E. V. Coan, F. G. Hochberg, W. G. Lyons, et al. (1998) Common and scientific names of aquatic invertebrates from the United States and Canada: Mollusks, 2nd ed., American Fisheries Society Special Publication 26
