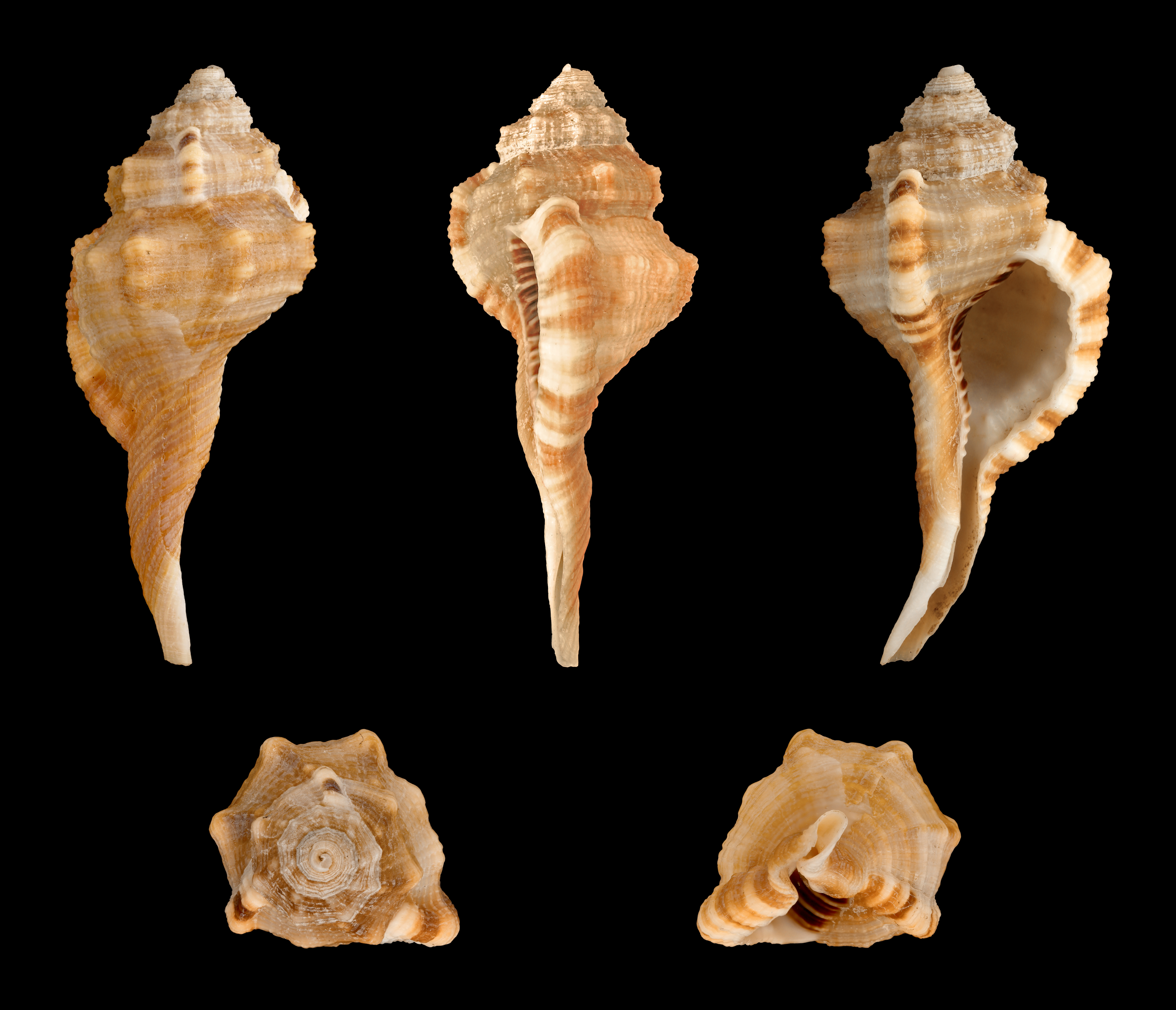

Scientific classification
- Kingdom: Animalia
- Phylum: Mollusca
- Class: Gastropoda
- Subclass: Caenogastropoda
- Order: Littorinimorpha
- Family: Cymatiidae
- Genus: Ranularia
- Species: R. testudinaria

Binomial name
- Ranularia testudinaria (A. Adams & Reeve, 1850)

Synonyms
- Cymatium testudinarium (A. Adams & Reeve, 1850); Cymatium (Ranularia) testudinarium (A. Adams & Reeve, 1850); Triton testudinaria A. Adams & Reeve, 1850

= Ranularia testudinaria =

Species of gastropod

Ranularia testudinaria is a species of predatory sea snail, a marine gastropod mollusk in the family Cymatiidae.

== Description ==
The shell size is between 50 mm and 100 mm.

== Distribution ==
This species occurs in the Indian Ocean off the Mascarene Basin, along the Philippines and in the Western Pacific Ocean off New Caledonia.
