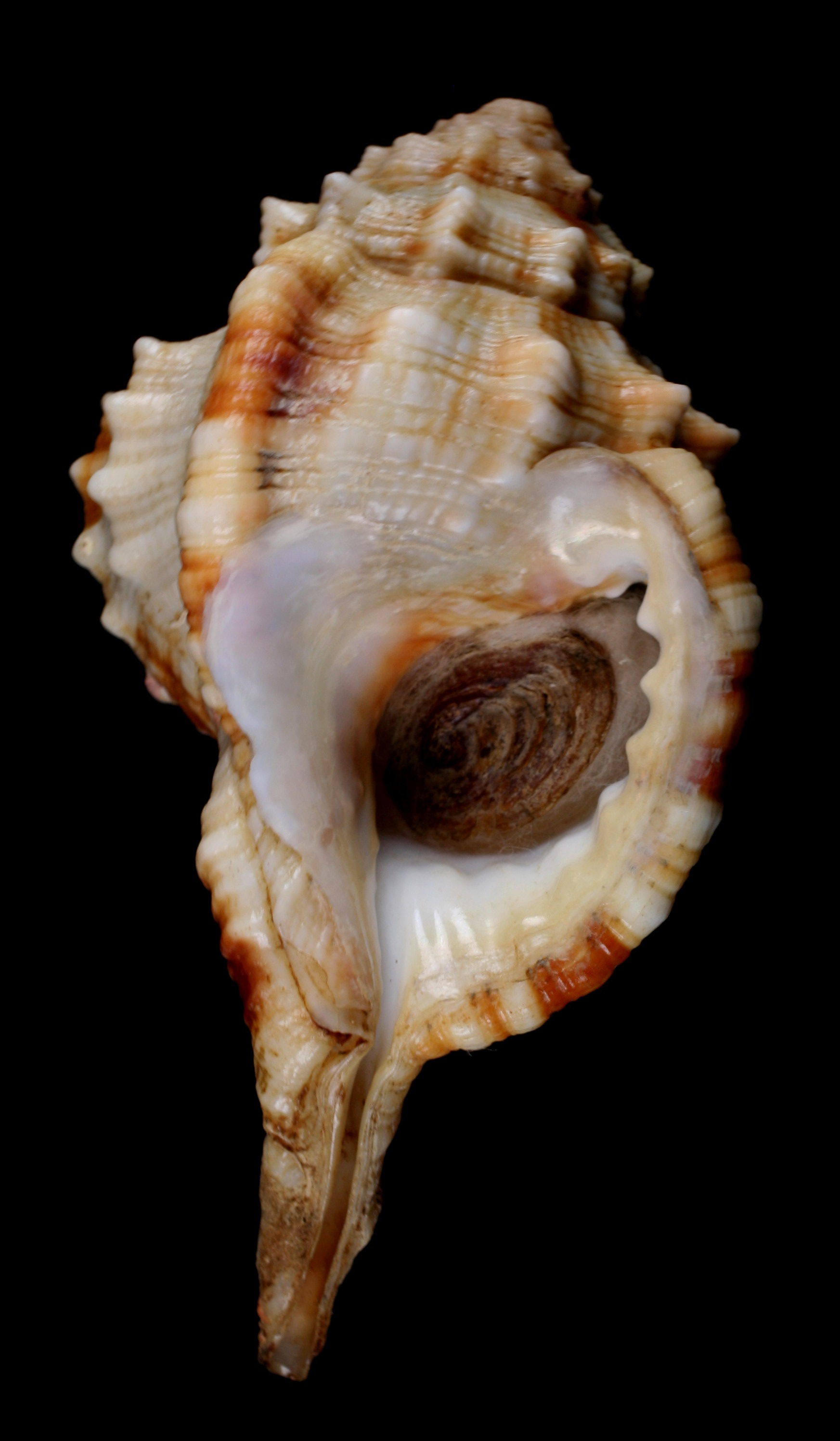
- Apertural view of Ranularia dunkeri (Lischke, 1868) with operculum

Scientific classification
- Kingdom: Animalia
- Phylum: Mollusca
- Class: Gastropoda
- Subclass: Caenogastropoda
- Order: Littorinimorpha
- Family: Cymatiidae
- Genus: Ranularia
- Species: R. dunkeri

Binomial name
- Ranularia dunkeri (Lischke, 1868)

Synonyms
- Ranularia dunkeri iredalei Beu, 1968; Triton dunkeri Lischke, 1868

= Ranularia dunkeri =

Species of gastropod

Ranularia dunkeri is a species of predatory sea snail, a marine gastropod mollusk in the family Cymatiidae.
