= Ranularia rehderi =

Scientific classification
- Kingdom: Animalia
- Phylum: Mollusca
- Class: Gastropoda
- Subclass: Caenogastropoda
- Order: Littorinimorpha
- Family: Cymatiidae
- Genus: Ranularia
- Species: R. rehderi

Binomial name
- Ranularia rehderi (A.H. Verrill, 1950)

Synonyms
- Cymatium rehderi A. H. Verrill, 1950

Species of gastropod

Ranularia rehderi is a species of predatory sea snail, a marine gastropod mollusk in the family Cymatiidae.
