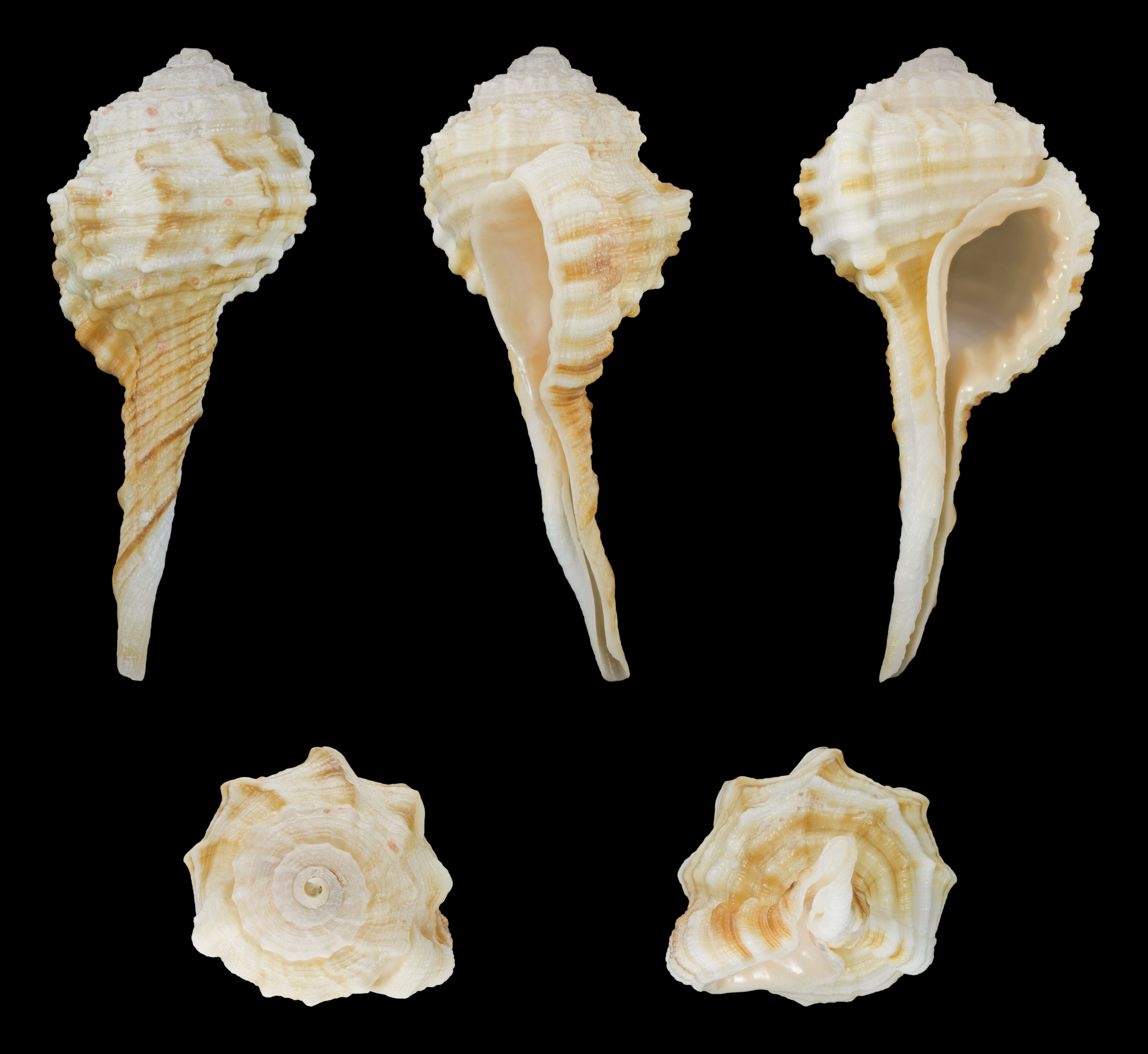

Scientific classification
- Kingdom: Animalia
- Phylum: Mollusca
- Class: Gastropoda
- Subclass: Caenogastropoda
- Order: Littorinimorpha
- Family: Cymatiidae
- Genus: Ranularia
- Species: R. springsteeni

Binomial name
- Ranularia springsteeni (Beu, 1987)

Synonyms
- Cymatium (Ranularia) springsteeni Beu, 1987

= Ranularia springsteeni =

Species of gastropod

Ranularia springsteeni is a species of predatory sea snail, a marine gastropod mollusk in the family Cymatiidae.

== Distribution ==
This marine species occurs off New Caledonia.
