= Ranularia monilifera =

Scientific classification
- Kingdom: Animalia
- Phylum: Mollusca
- Class: Gastropoda
- Subclass: Caenogastropoda
- Order: Littorinimorpha
- Family: Cymatiidae
- Genus: Ranularia
- Species: R. monilifera

Binomial name
- Ranularia monilifera (A. Adams & Reeve, 1850)

Synonyms
- Cymatium moniliferum (Adams & Reeve, 1850); Triton monilifera A. Adams & Reeve, 1850; Triton pachycheylos Tapparone-Canefri, 1876

Species of gastropod

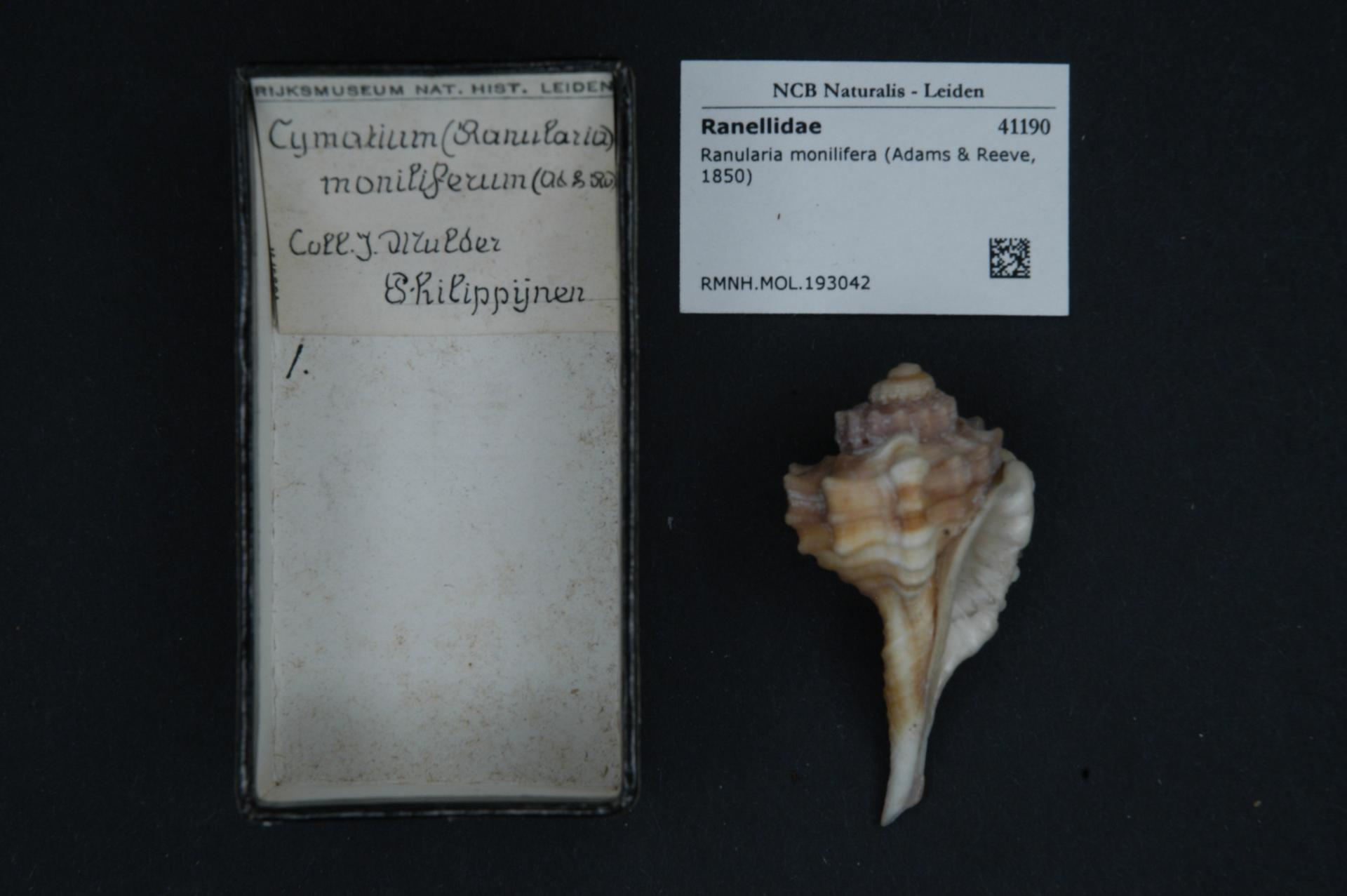

Ranularia monilifera is a species of predatory sea snail, a marine gastropod mollusk in the family Cymatiidae.
