= Ranularia parthi =

Scientific classification
- Kingdom: Animalia
- Phylum: Mollusca
- Class: Gastropoda
- Subclass: Caenogastropoda
- Order: Littorinimorpha
- Family: Cymatiidae
- Genus: Ranularia
- Species: R. parthi

Binomial name
- Ranularia parthi (Arthur, 1991)

Synonyms
- Cymatium (Ranularia) parthi Arthur, 1991

Species of gastropod

Ranularia parthi is a species of predatory sea snail, a marine gastropod mollusk in the family Cymatiidae.
