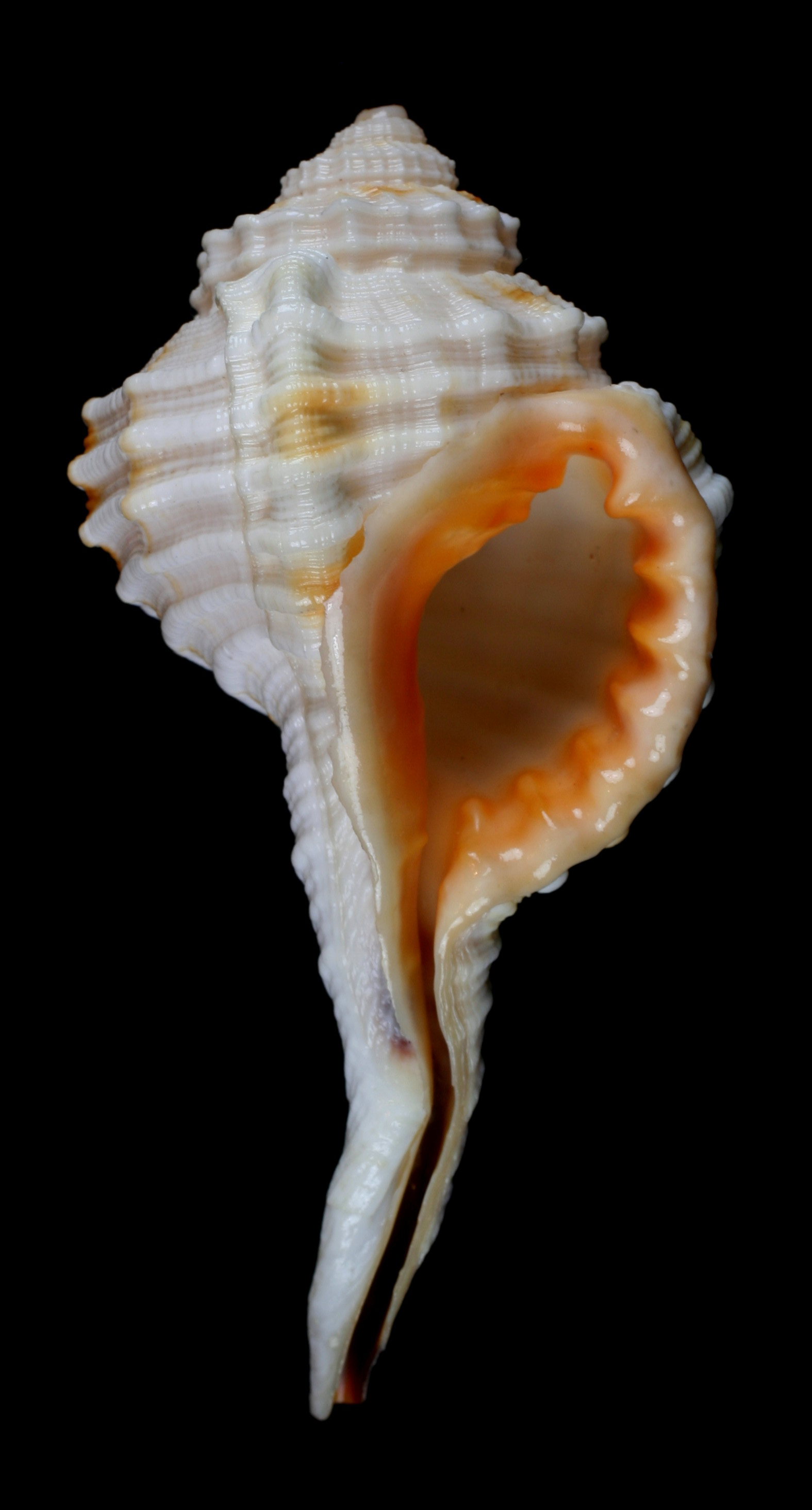
- Apertural view of Ranularia caudatua (Gmelin, 1791)

Scientific classification
- Kingdom: Animalia
- Phylum: Mollusca
- Class: Gastropoda
- Subclass: Caenogastropoda
- Order: Littorinimorpha
- Family: Cymatiidae
- Genus: Ranularia
- Species: R. caudata

Binomial name
- Ranularia caudata (Gmelin, 1791)

Synonyms
- Buccinum costatum Meuschen, F.C., 1787; Cymatium (Ranularia) caudatum (Gmelin, J.F., 1791); Murex caudatus Gmelin, 1791 (basionym); Triton canaliferum Lamarck, 1822; Tritonium varicosum Link, 1807; Tritonocauda caudata (Gmelin, 1791); Tritonocauda caudata vulticula Iredale, 1936

= Ranularia caudata =

Species of gastropod

Ranularia caudata, the bent-neck triton, is a species of predatory sea snail, a marine gastropod mollusk in the family Cymatiidae.

== Description ==
(Described in Latin as Triton canaliferum Lamarck, 1822) The shell is somewhat pear-shaped and features a distinct siphonal canal at the base. The surface is sculpted with transverse furrows and longitudinal, fold-like nodules, which create a slightly decussated (criss-crossed) texture. Its coloration is a tawny-white.

The whorls are channeled at the sutures, and the spire is notably short. The most striking feature is the siphonal canal, which is remarkably slender and graceful.

The size of a shell of an adult snail varies between 38 mm and 94 mm.

== Distribution ==
This species occurs in the Indo-West Pacific along Tanzania.
