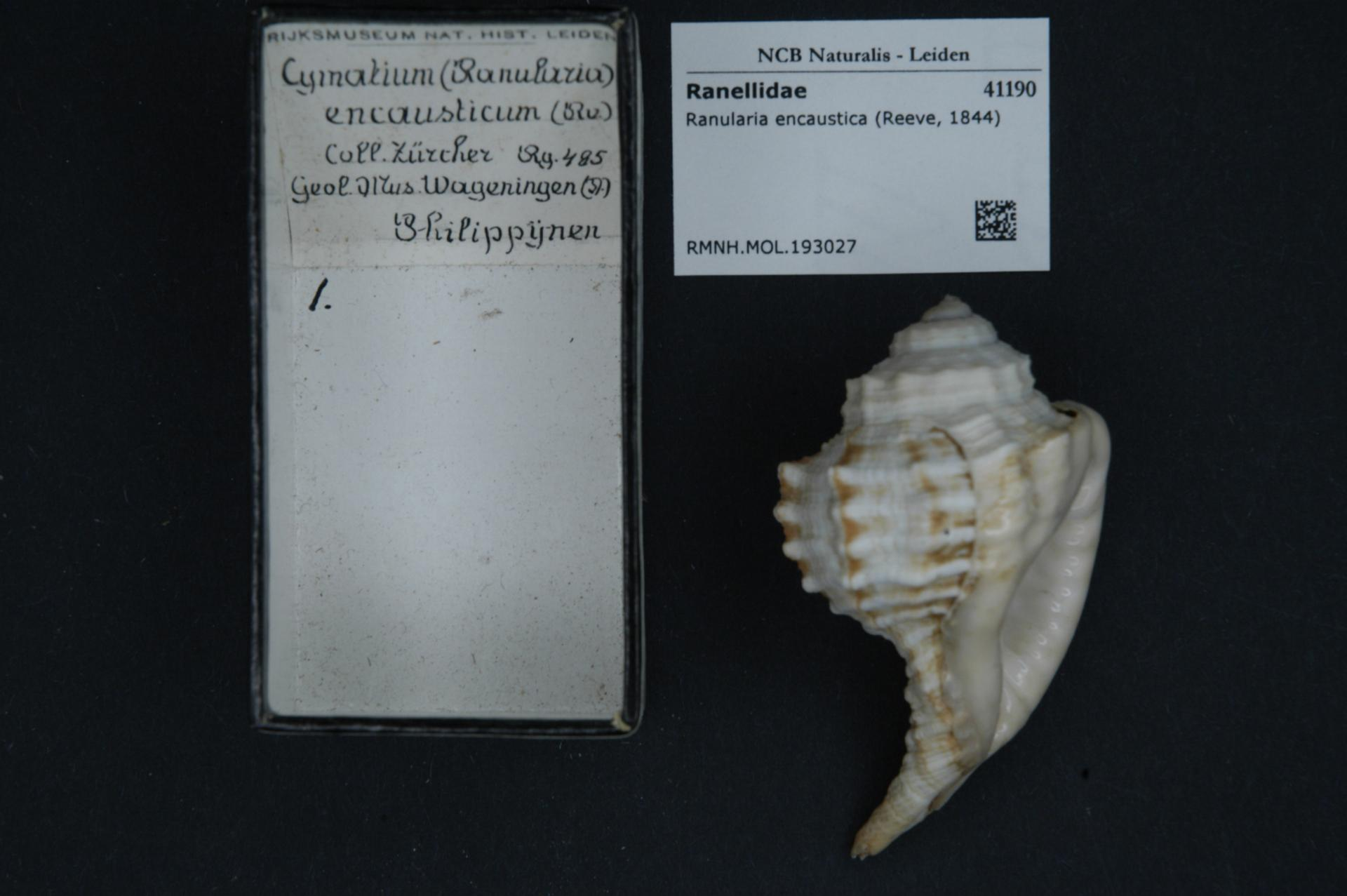

Scientific classification
- Kingdom: Animalia
- Phylum: Mollusca
- Class: Gastropoda
- Subclass: Caenogastropoda
- Order: Littorinimorpha
- Family: Cymatiidae
- Genus: Ranularia
- Species: R. encaustica

Binomial name
- Ranularia encaustica (Reeve, 1844)

Synonyms
- Triton encaustica Reeve, 1844; Triton pyriformis A. Adams, 1855

= Ranularia encaustica =

Species of gastropod

Ranularia encaustica is a species of predatory sea snail, a marine gastropod mollusc in the family Cymatiidae.
