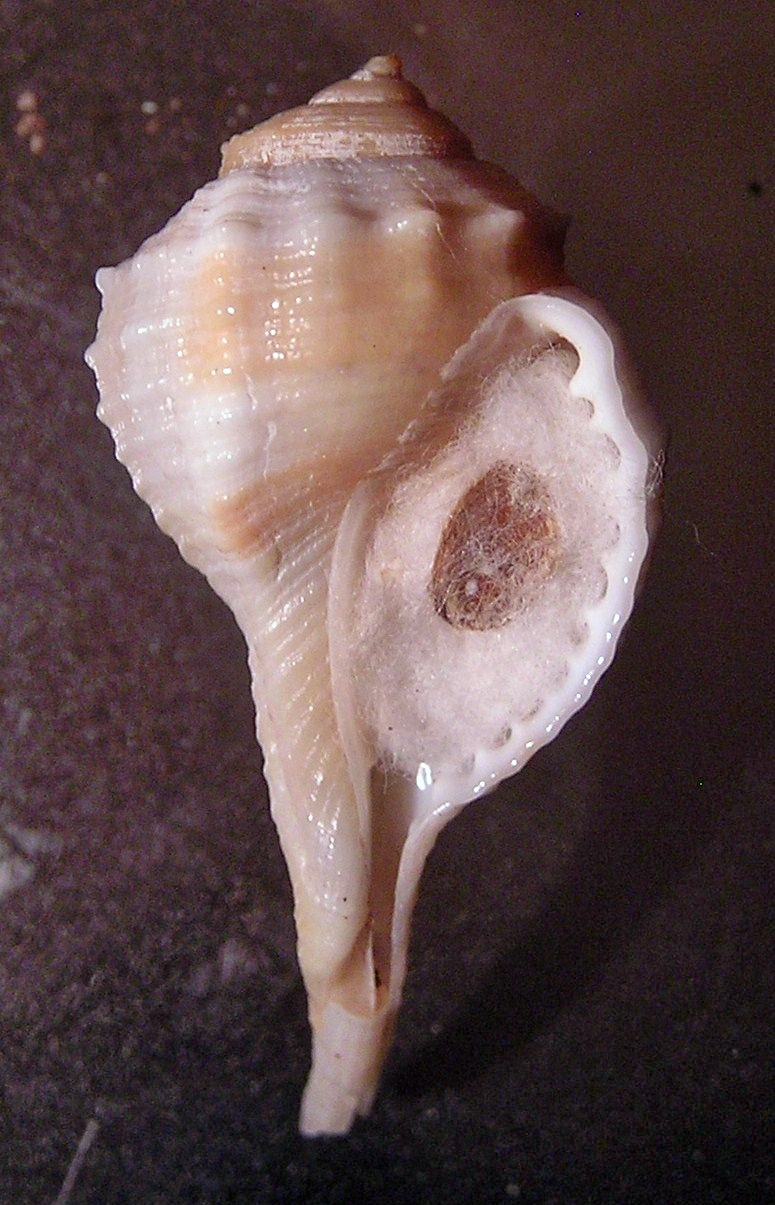

Scientific classification
- Kingdom: Animalia
- Phylum: Mollusca
- Class: Gastropoda
- Subclass: Caenogastropoda
- Order: Littorinimorpha
- Family: Cymatiidae
- Genus: Ranularia
- Species: R. oblita

Binomial name
- Ranularia oblita Lewis & Beu, 1976

= Ranularia oblita =

Species of gastropod

Ranularia oblita is a species of predatory sea snail, a marine gastropod mollusk in the family Cymatiidae.
