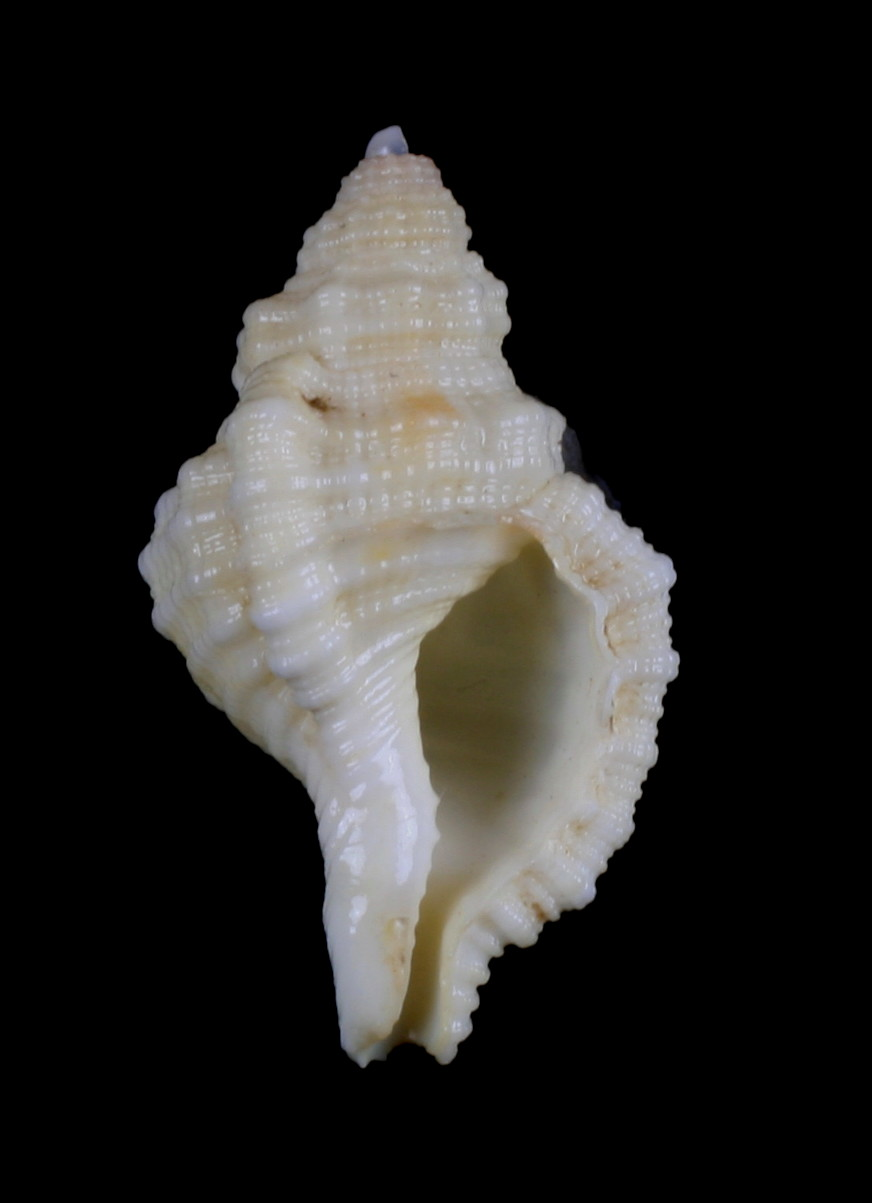
- Apertural view of Ranularia sinensis (Reeve, 1844)

Scientific classification
- Kingdom: Animalia
- Phylum: Mollusca
- Class: Gastropoda
- Subclass: Caenogastropoda
- Order: Littorinimorpha
- Family: Cymatiidae
- Genus: Ranularia
- Species: R. sinensis

Binomial name
- Ranularia sinensis (Reeve, 1844)

Synonyms
- Cymatium (Ranularia) sinense (Reeve, 1844); Cymatium defrenata Iredale, T., 1936; Ranularia sinensis defranata Iredale, 1936; Cymatium (Ranularia) sinensis defrenata Iredale, T., 193; Triton sinensis Reeve, 1844

= Ranularia sinensis =

Species of gastropod

Ranularia sinensis, the Chinese triton, is a species of predatory sea snail, a marine gastropod mollusk in the family Cymatiidae.

This species was originally described by Reeve in 1844 as Cymatium (Ranularia) sinense.

== Description ==
The shell size varies between 50mm and 94 mm. The shell has strong spiral ribs and intermediate riblets consisting of 6 or 7 major ribs on the body whorl and 2 or 3 on each spire whorl. The first 2 or 3 ribs on each whorl are bifid. Axial ribs on spire whorls are numerous, and become strong nodules on the periphery. Later whorls may have strong, high varices. The outer lip has 7 or 8 strong bifid teeth internally. It is white or fawn in color and the shell is covered with a thick, brown, sometimes hairy periostracum when alive.

== Distribution ==
This marine species occurs off South Japan and New South Wales, Australia at depths of 30-200m.
