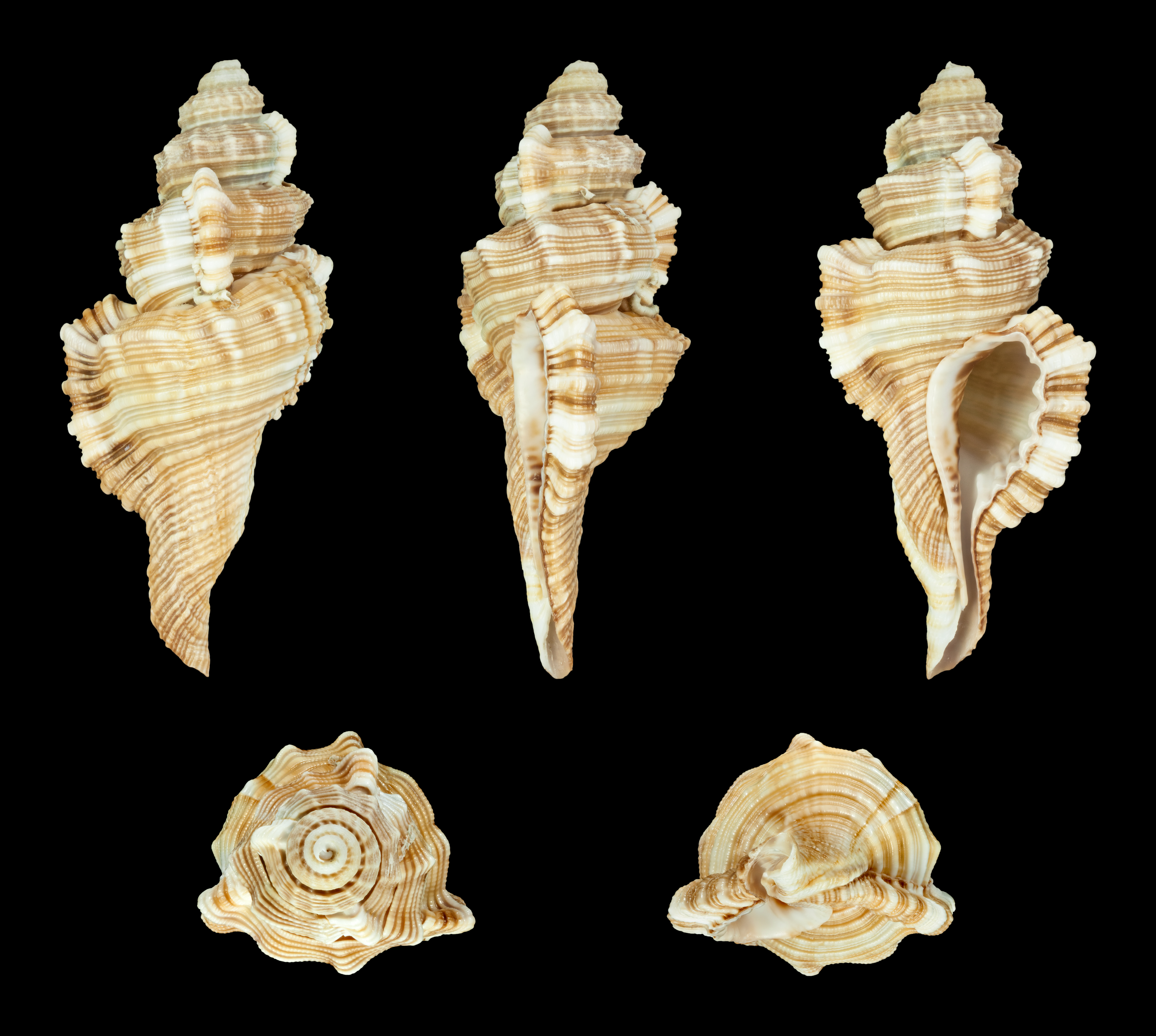

Scientific classification
- Kingdom: Animalia
- Phylum: Mollusca
- Class: Gastropoda
- Subclass: Caenogastropoda
- Order: Littorinimorpha
- Family: Cymatiidae
- Genus: Ranularia
- Species: R. tripa

Binomial name
- Ranularia tripa (Lamarck, 1822)

Synonyms
- Triton tripa Lamarck, 1822

= Ranularia tripa =

Species of gastropod

Ranularia tripa is a species of predatory sea snail, a marine gastropod mollusk in the family Cymatiidae.
