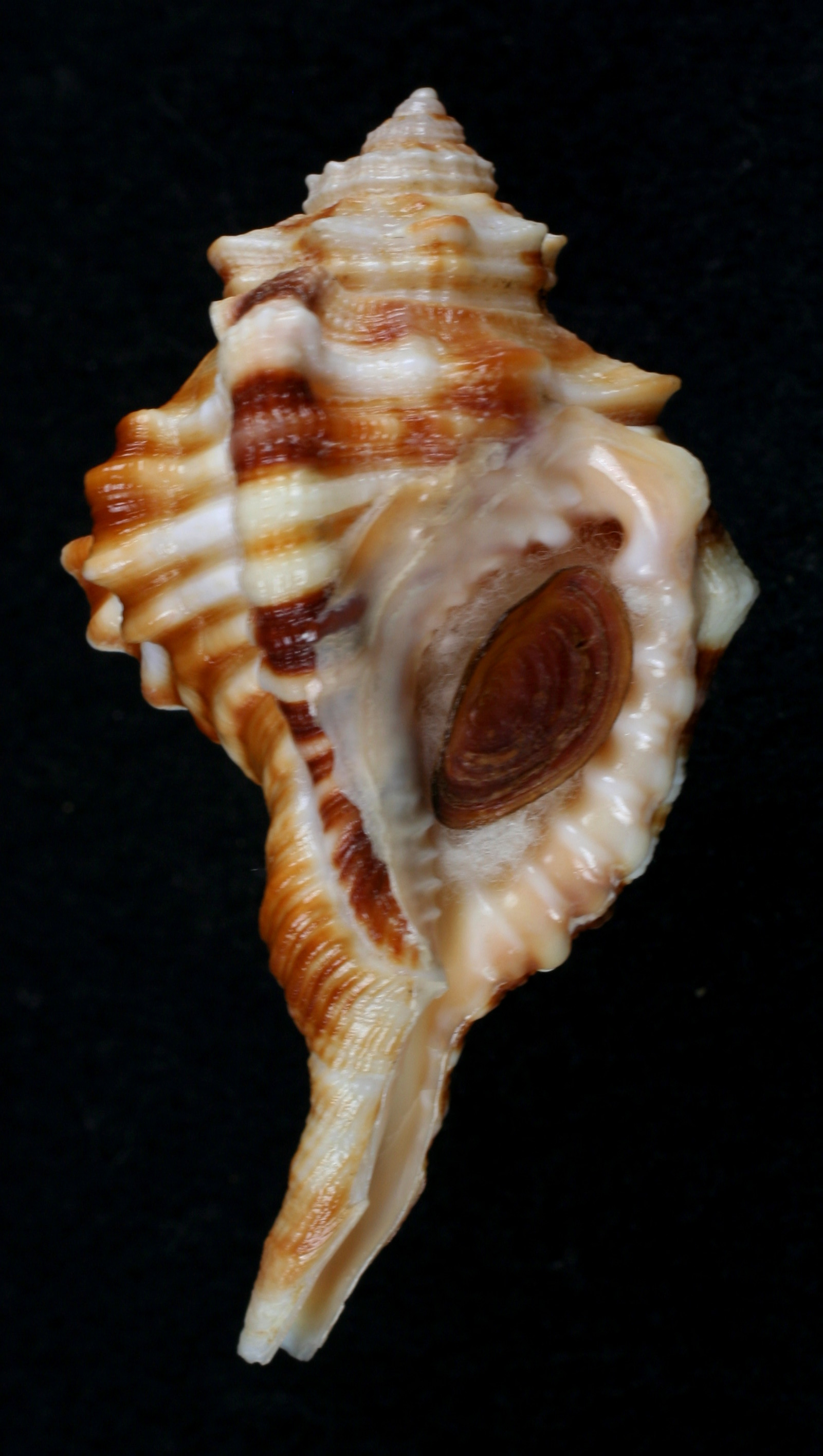
- Apertural view of Ranularia trilineata (Reeve, 1844) with operculum

Scientific classification
- Kingdom: Animalia
- Phylum: Mollusca
- Class: Gastropoda
- Subclass: Caenogastropoda
- Order: Littorinimorpha
- Family: Cymatiidae
- Genus: Ranularia
- Species: R. trilineata

Binomial name
- Ranularia trilineata (Reeve, 1844)

Synonyms
- Cymatium trilineatum (Reeve, L.A., 1844); Cymatium (Ranularia) trilineatum (Reeve, L.A., 1844); Gutturinum trilineatum Vine, 1986; Triton trilineata Reeve, 1844

= Ranularia trilineata =

Species of gastropod

Ranularia trilineata, the three-lined triton, is a species of predatory sea snail, a marine gastropod mollusk in the family Cymatiidae.

== Description ==
The length of the shell varies between 38 mm and 90 mm

== Distribution ==
This species occurs in the Red Sea, the Indian Ocean and the Western Pacific Ocean.
