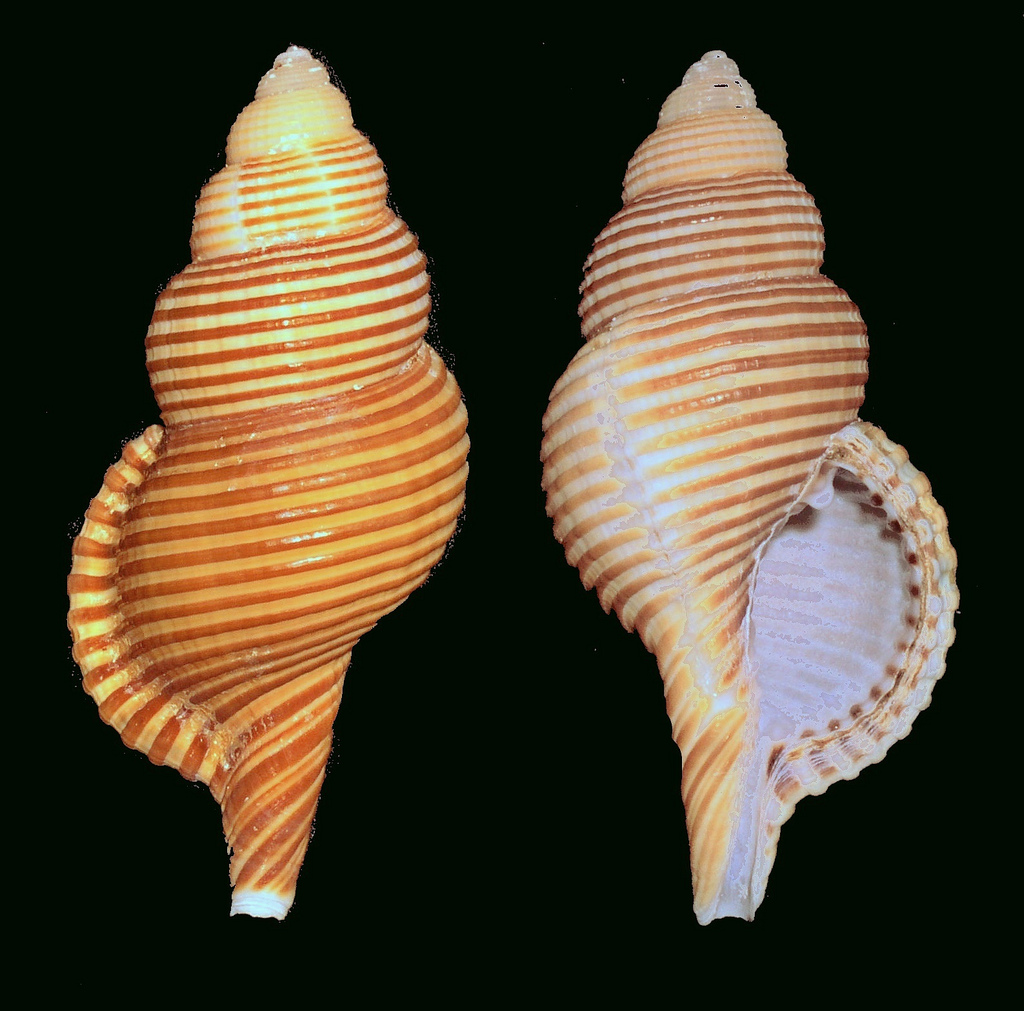
- shell of Gelagna succincta

Scientific classification
- Kingdom: Animalia
- Phylum: Mollusca
- Class: Gastropoda
- Subclass: Caenogastropoda
- Order: Littorinimorpha
- Family: Cymatiidae
- Genus: Gelagna
- Species: G. succincta

Binomial name
- Gelagna succincta (Linnaeus, 1771)

Synonyms
- Cymatium clandestinum (Lamarck, 1816); Cymatium (Linatella) succinctum (Linnaeus, 1771); Eutritonium clandestinum Lamarck; Linatella clandestina Lamarck; Linatella succincta (Linnaeus, 1771); Murex succinctus Linnaeus, 1758; Neptunea doliata Röding, 1798; Triton clandestinus Lamarck, 1816; Triton confinis Brancsik, 1896

= Gelagna succincta =

Species of gastropod

Gelagna succincta, the lesser girdled triton, is a species of predatory sea snail, a marine gastropod mollusk in the family Cymatiidae.

== Distribution ==
This species is distributed in the Indian Ocean (Tanzania, Madagascar), in the Atlantic Ocean (Gabon, West Africa, Cape Verde) and the Red Sea. Also reported from Brazil and from South-East Florida. Beached shells are rarely known from the East coast of Barbados, Lesser Antilles.

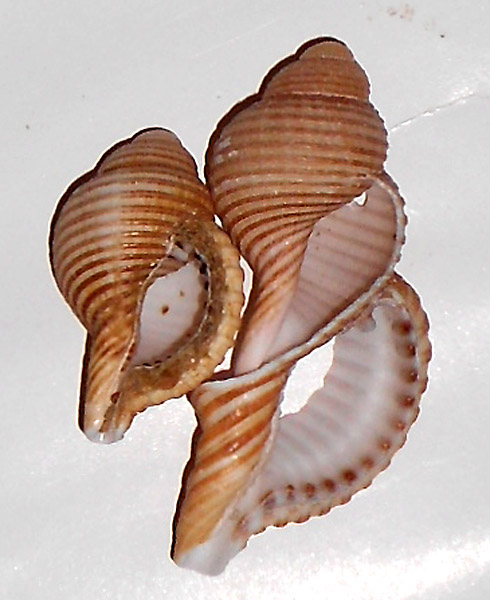
Lesser Girdled Triton

== Description ==
The shell size varies between 30 mm and 80 mm.

The maximum recorded shell length is 45 mm.

== Habitat ==
The minimum recorded depth for this species is 20 m; maximum recorded depth is 20 m.
