= Gelagna pallida =

Scientific classification
- Kingdom: Animalia
- Phylum: Mollusca
- Class: Gastropoda
- Subclass: Caenogastropoda
- Order: Littorinimorpha
- Family: Cymatiidae
- Genus: Gelagna
- Species: G. pallida

Binomial name
- Gelagna pallida (Parth, 1996)

Synonyms
- Linatella (Gelagna) pallida Parth, 1996

Species of gastropod

Gelagna pallida is a species of predatory sea snail, a marine gastropod mollusk in the family Cymatiidae.
