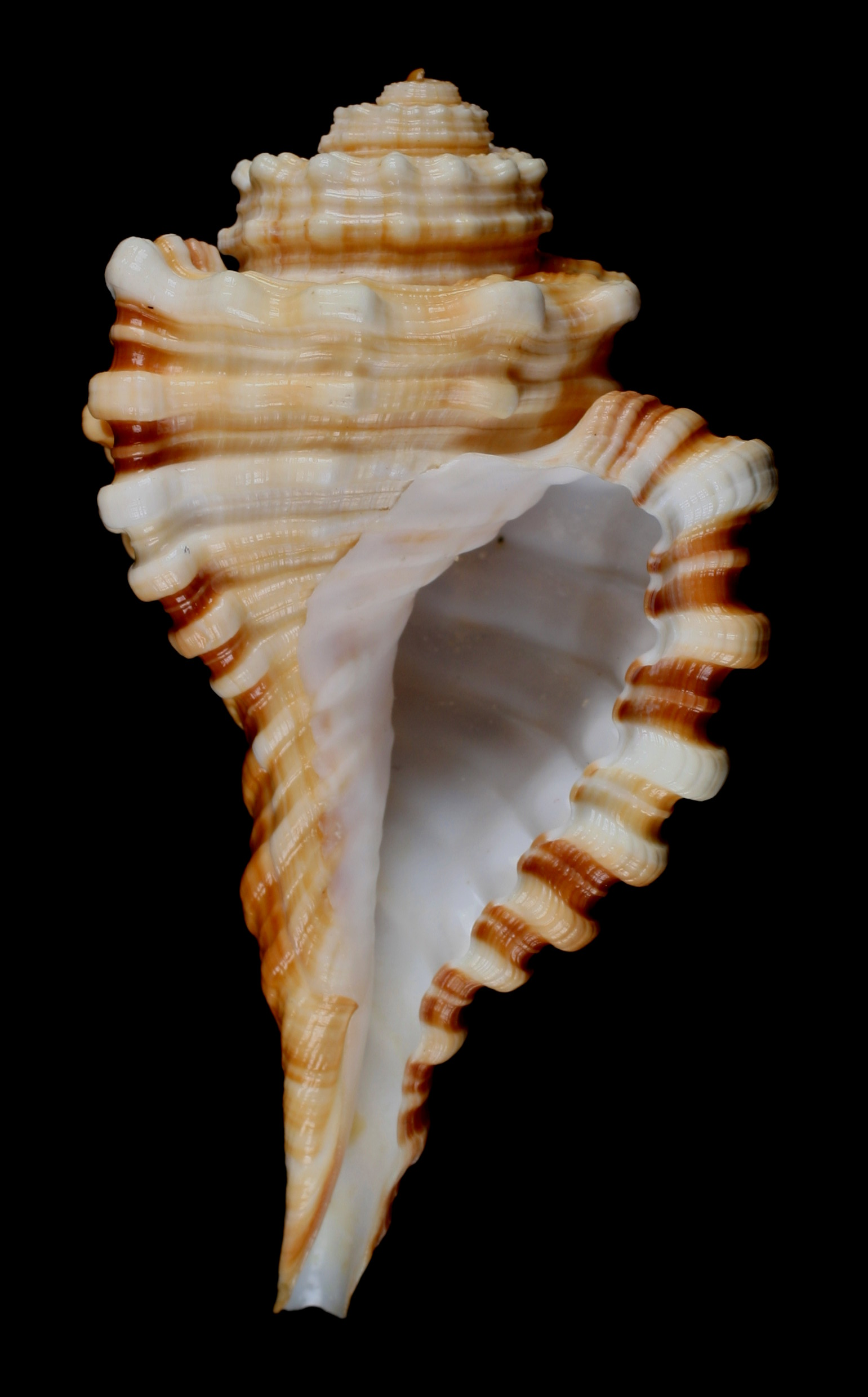
- Apertural view of Ranularia boschi (Abbott & Lewis, 1970)

Scientific classification
- Kingdom: Animalia
- Phylum: Mollusca
- Class: Gastropoda
- Subclass: Caenogastropoda
- Order: Littorinimorpha
- Family: Cymatiidae
- Genus: Ranularia
- Species: R. boschi

Binomial name
- Ranularia boschi (Abbott & Lewis, 1970)

Synonyms
- Cymatium (Ranularia) boschi Abbott & Lewis, 1970

= Ranularia boschi =

Species of gastropod

Ranularia boschi is a species of predatory sea snail, a marine gastropod mollusk in the family Cymatiidae.
