= List of Perception episodes =

TNT promotional poster for Perception.

Perception is an American crime drama created by Kenneth Biller & Mike Sussman, which aired on TNT from July 9, 2012, through March 17, 2015. The series stars Eric McCormack as Dr. Daniel J. Pierce, a schizophrenic neuropsychiatrist and college professor, who is enlisted by the FBI to assist on some of their most complex cases.

== Series overview ==
Season	Episodes	Originally released	
Season	Episodes	First released	Last released
1	10	July 9, 2012	September 17, 2012
2	14	June 25, 2013	March 18, 2014
3	15	June 17, 2014	March 17, 2015

== Episodes ==
=== Season 1 (2012) ===
No. overall	No. in season	Title	Directed by	Written by	Original release date	U.S. viewers (millions)
1	1	"Pilot"	Alan Poul	Kenneth Biller & Mike Sussman	July 9, 2012	5.60
FBI agent Kate Moretti recruits her former professor Dr. Daniel Pierce to help with a case involving the death of a pharmaceutical executive.
2	2	"Faces"	Greg Beeman	Kenneth Biller & Mike Sussman	July 16, 2012	5.33
The FBI investigate a case involving the death of a mail order bride whose husband has a medical condition that makes him unable to recognize faces. Kate catches the eye of a new professor, who doesn't get the warmest of welcomes from Pierce.
3	3	"86'd"	Deran Sarafian	Stephen Tolkin	July 23, 2012	4.54
During a case involving the resurfacing of the "date night" killer, a serial killer from 1986, Kate and Pierce are led to a woman named Lacey, who escaped the killer's attack but who still believes it's 1986. Meanwhile, Lewicki takes issue with Kate constantly coming to Pierce for help.
4	4	"Cipher"	Deran Sarafian	Jerry Shandy	July 30, 2012	3.73
Pierce stumbles across a cipher left in a letter to the editor which alludes to a future string of crimes. Lewicki goes on strike.
5	5	"The Messenger"	Christopher Misiano	Stephen Tolkin & Jason Ning	August 6, 2012	4.10
While investigating the death of an ex-junkie, Pierce and Kate are led to a cult and a boy who believes he can talk to God.
6	6	"Lovesick"	Greg Beeman	Jason Ning	August 20, 2012	3.90
Pierce helps Kate investigate the death of a therapist who tried to "cure" his patients of their homosexuality. Pierce attends a fundraiser gala held by Dean Haley.
7	7	"Nemesis"	Christopher Misiano	Amanda Green	August 27, 2012	3.98
Kate and Pierce investigate the death of a judge thought to be murdered by a schizophrenic. Kate learns more about Pierce's battle with schizophrenia.
8	8	"Kilimanjaro"	Tawnia McKiernan	Amanda Green	September 3, 2012	4.21
Kate and Pierce investigate the death of a young girl who was killed in her dorm room, which forces Pierce to revisit his own past.
9	9	"Shadow"	Ken Biller	Mike Sussman	September 10, 2012	3.54
Pierce witnesses the murder of a young man claiming a conspiracy involving big business and Chicago politicians, and then discovers that the murder may not have been real after all.
10	10	"Light"	Ken Biller	Ken Biller	September 17, 2012	3.49
After Pierce commits himself to a psychiatric ward, Kate discovers that the murder Pierce witnessed actually happened. Pierce meets his new psychiatrist, Dr. Caroline Newsome, on whom he based his imaginary friend Natalie.

=== Season 2 (2013–14) ===
No. overall	No. in season	Title	Directed by	Written by	Original release date	U.S. viewers (millions)
11	1	"Ch-Ch-Changes"	Greg Beeman	Ken Biller & Jason Ning	June 25, 2013	4.01
Pierce is asked to be an expert witness in a trial against a biker who is facing the death penalty for torturing and murdering his wife. The District Attorney prosecuting the case is Donnie, Kate's soon-to-be ex-husband. After examining the biker, Pierce comes to the conclusion that he is psychologically a completely different person. Meanwhile, Pierce has begun a relationship with Caroline, however she wants to keep it a secret as he was a patient of hers.
12	2	"Alienation"	Greg Beeman	Michael Sussman	July 2, 2013	3.51
Pierce and Kate investigate the strange case of a woman claiming her husband has been replaced by an alien. Natalie's return to Pierce's life puts strain on his and Caroline's relationship.
13	3	"Blindness"	Jeff Woolnough	Nicki Paluga	July 9, 2013	4.02
A judge is murdered during a court hearing. A referee is stabbed in the middle of a basketball game. No one claims to have seen the killings happen. Pierce believes that the victims are somehow connected, but the rest of the FBI, save Kate, are putting their money on the theories of a behavioral analyst.
14	4	"Toxic"	Jeff Woolnough	Warren Hsu Leonard	July 16, 2013	3.23
Pierce accepts an invitation to work on a case from a renowned environmental activist concerning a chain of abnormal neurological reactions in a group of young girls. However, upon examining the girls, Pierce discovers that a dark secret is at the root of their ailments. Meanwhile, Kate questions Pierce's motives in working on a case without her.
15	5	"Caleidoscope"	Christopher Misiano	Jonathan Abrahams	July 23, 2013	3.48
Pierce tries to communicate with an asocial man, who can describe the details of a murder, using a social simulation game called Caleidoscope. He gets sucked in and is enchanted by a virtual lady - and virtual karaoke.
16	6	"Defective"	Andrew Bernstein	Raf Green & Charley Dane	July 30, 2013	3.40
Pierce and Donnie work together after a brain device meant to control tremors seems to be defective with multiple reports across the nation. When a doctor agrees to talk with Pierce and Donnie, he is later found dead with his wife in a coma. The two must determine if the corporation making this product is to blame, or if something more is going on. Meanwhile, Max dates a Brazilian girl whom he is trying to help get a scholarship.
17	7	"Neuropositive"	Andrew Bernstein	Sean Whitesell	August 6, 2013	3.06
A man makes a confession on his deathbed to Kate, but she has trouble buying it so she calls Pierce to see if he is telling the truth. Meanwhile, the two look into a series of killings from the past.
18	8	"Asylum"	Greg Beeman	Jonathan Abrahams	August 13, 2013	3.25
Pierce is called to look into a stabbing at a psychiatric hospital; while in a series of hallucinations, Pierce realizes there is something dark going on in the hospital.
19	9	"Wounded"	Ken Biller	Michael Sussman	August 20, 2013	3.44
Pierce is asked to look into the case of a war hero that exhibits violent, erratic behavior and realizes she has a neurological disorder from contracting herpes. Later she is accused of murdering a former platoon colleague and it's up to Pierce and Kate to prove her innocence. Meanwhile, Pierce's college girlfriend returns to teach for a semester.
20	10	"Warrior"	Ken Biller	Amanda Green	August 27, 2013	3.62
Moretti faces criminal charges after taking things into her own hands while working on a dangerous case. Pierce and Donnie strive to clear her name, but as conflicting evidence builds, even Kate begins to question her own innocence. Donnie and Kate gets closer together.
21	11	"Curveball"	Greg Beeman	Jason Ning	February 25, 2014	2.02
Pierce helps out when an autistic teen is under investigation for murder with help from his hallucination Hall of Fame Mordecai "Three Finger" Brown. Dean Haley sets out to convince a neuroscience prodigy to attend CLMU.
22	12	"Brotherhood"	Christopher Misiano	Sean Whitesell	March 4, 2014	1.71
Lewicki's brother, Kenny, makes a surprise visit. When he's later named as the suspect in a murder, Pierce's loyalties are torn between friendship and justice. An enticing offer makes Lewicki question Pierce's loyalty to him.
23	13	"Cobra"	Christopher Misiano	Jonathan Abrahams & Nicki Paluga	March 11, 2014	2.36
Tensions arise between the CIA and FBI after Pierce receives a tip that the CIA might be assassinating U.S. citizens. Things become more complicated when one of Pierce's close friends is murdered. Meanwhile, Moretti tries to overcome her trust issues with Donnie.
24	14	"Obsession"	Christopher Misiano	Raf Green & Charley Dane	March 18, 2014	1.76
Pierce's mental stability is questioned and his job threatened when he is accused of stalking his ex-girlfriend, Caroline Newsome. As the situation escalates, Moretti works to find the real stalker with help from a visiting inspector from Canada.

=== Season 3 (2014–15) ===
No. overall	No. in season	Title	Directed by	Written by	Original release date	U.S. viewers (millions)
25	1	"Paris"	Ken Biller	Michael Sussman	June 17, 2014	3.07
Pierce is approached in Paris by the FBI to help with a dangerous international case. Meanwhile, Max and Dean Haley devise a plan to get Pierce back in Chicago.
26	2	"Painless"	Eric McCormack	Jason Ning	June 24, 2014	2.55
During a trial, a prosecutor dies in the courtroom. Pierce and Moretti hunt for the killer. Meanwhile, Moretti and Donnie discuss their future.
27	3	"Shiver"	Christopher Misiano	Raf Green	July 1, 2014	3.19
Pierce is brought in to interview a young bank robbery hostage with a developmental disorder. More than money is involved regarding the case. Meanwhile, Pierce's estranged father James (Peter Coyote) visits him.
28	4	"Possession"	Christopher Misiano	Warren Hsu Leonard	July 8, 2014	2.58
Moretti asks Pierce to examine Elena Douglas (Rya Kihlstedt), who has confessed to murder and claims to be possessed by the Devil. Meanwhile, Donnie and Moretti's wedding plans must be re-examined.
29	5	"Eternity"	Jeff Woolnough	Story by : David Eagleman; Teleplay by : Jonathan Abrahams	July 15, 2014	2.58
Moretti and Pierce investigate how renowned neuroscientist Landon Jennings is found dead in his impenetrable study. Lewicki gets double duty, now that Pierce's father James moves in with them.
30	6	"Inconceivable"	Jeff Woolnough	Nicki Paluga	July 22, 2014	2.85
Moretti must find an infant and its kidnapper, only to discover the baby is a doll. When the baby's mother is discovered murdered, she and Pierce must track down the killer and find out what happened to the real baby, that is if there even was one. Meanwhile, Donnie looks into buying a house in the suburbs, causing another discussion with Moretti.
31	7	"Bolero"	Alrick Riley	Tawnya Bhattacharya & Ali Laventhol	July 29, 2014	2.79
Pierce witnesses a gallery owner die during a seizure caused by a video installation and convinces Moretti that it was actually a murder. The search for the killer uncovers a bold art heist. The casework also forces Pierce to re-examine his relationship with Natalie.
32	8	"Prologue"	Alrick Riley	Michael Sussman	August 5, 2014	2.75
When an FBI agent from one of Pierce's unsolved cases ends up dead, Pierce's therapist cautions him about revisiting the case.
33	9	"Silence"	LeVar Burton	Raf Green	August 12, 2014	2.87
A sniper fires upon the lobby of the Federal Building, wounding an agent. However, Pierce believes the shooter was targeting the nearby security scanning machine as an act against technology. Meanwhile, Donnie is asked by Shelby Coulson to run as alderman.
34	10	"Dirty"	LeVar Burton	Jonathan Abrahams	August 19, 2014	2.57
After Donnie finds himself accused of murder, Pierce and Moretti set out to clear his name. Meanwhile, Pierce's father poses as the husband of Ruby (Joanna Cassidy), a woman with Alzheimer's, while asking Pierce and Moretti to find a fugitive that Ruby insists she has recognised. The seemingly innocuous investigation puts Pierce in danger.
35	11	"Brainstorm"	Andrew Bernstein	Jason Ning	February 17, 2015	1.61
After Pierce suffers a traumatic injury, his father and Paul must choose to allow a high-risk surgery. Meanwhile, Pierce works to solve an Agatha Christie style murder case that causes him to question everything.
36	12	"Meat"	Andrew Bernstein	Nicki Paluga	February 24, 2015	1.30
Moretti goes undercover to investigate an animal rights group suspected of foul play in the brutal murders of a meat company's owners. While helping solve the case, Pierce considers making a deeply personal confession to Moretti.
37	13	"Mirror"	Elodie Keene	Katie Gruel	March 3, 2015	1.74
Pierce and Moretti investigate an international scandal with the murders of a diplomat and a reporter. At the same time, Moretti tries to write her vows for her wedding to Donnie.
38	14	"Romeo"	Ken Biller	Amanda Green	March 10, 2015	1.68
Days before Moretti's wedding, Pierce solves the case of the murder of one of his students. The victim's boyfriend is suspected of the crime and being mentally ill. Pierce also realizes his feelings for Moretti.
39	15	"Run"	Ken Biller	Ken Biller & Jonathan Abrahams	March 17, 2015	1.78
Kate Moretti is abducted on the day of her wedding and Pierce and Donnie have to rescue her.
