= Professor (disambiguation) =

A professor is a senior teacher, lecturer and researcher, usually in a college or university.

Professor may also refer to:

== Entertainment ==
=== Fictional characters ===
- The Professor (Gilligan's Island), a character in the 1960s TV series
- The Professor, a McDonaldland character
- The Professor, a nickname for the Seventh Doctor in the TV series Doctor Who
- The Professor (Money Heist), a character in the Netflix series
- Professor, an anthropomorphic mole character from the Spyro video game series
- Professor, a character from the Ape Escape video game series
- Professor, a character in the 1979 Soviet film Stalker
- Professor Nutty Nut-Meg „The Professor”, one of Felix the Cat's main foes

=== Literature ===
- The Professor (novel), by Charlotte Brontë, 1857
- The Professor, a 1938 novel by Rex Warner
- The Professors: The 101 Most Dangerous Academics in America, by conservative American author David Horowitz

=== Film, television and theatre ===
- Professor (1962 film), an Indian Hindi musical
- Professor (1972 film), an Indian Malayalam-language film
- The Professor (1919 film), an uncompleted silent comedy by Charlie Chaplin
- The Professor (1986 film) or Il camorrista, an Italian film based on the life of crime boss Raffaele Cutolo
- The Professor (2018 film), an American comedy-drama
- "The Professor" (My Name Is Earl), a television episode
- Professor, the puppeteer of Punch and Judy shows

== People ==
=== Stage name ===
- Prof (rapper) (born 1984), American rapper
- Professor (musician) (born 1978), South African Kwaito musician

=== Nicknamed "The Professor" ===
- Roy Bittan (born 1949), American keyboardist in the E Street Band
- Grayson Boucher (born 1984), American street basketball player
- Raffaele Cutolo ("Il professore") (1941–2021), Italian crime boss
- Mohammad Hafeez (born 1980), Pakistani cricketer
- Jan Janssen (born 1940), Dutch professional cyclist
- Lefter Küçükandonyadis ("Ordinaryüs") (1925–2012), Turkish footballer
- Igor Larionov (born 1960), Russian ice hockey player
- Howard Lederer (born 1964), American professional poker player
- Greg Maddux (born 1966), American baseball pitcher
- Neil Peart (1952–2020), Canadian drummer for Rush
- David Poltorak (born 1954 or 1955), nicknamed The Professor, as a chaser on The Chase Australia
- Alain Prost (born 1955), French Formula One racing driver
- Mike Tenay (born 1954), American professional wrestling play-by-play announcer
- Alan Turing (1912–1954), nicknamed "Prof", English mathematician and computer scientist
  - Prof: Alan Turing Decoded, a 2015 biography of Turing
- Dai Vernon (1894–1992), Canadian sleight of hand magician
- Petpanomrung Kiatmuu9, (Petch), Thai kickboxer (1995)
- Nasser El Sonbaty (1965-2013), professional bodybuilder

== See also ==
- Professor T. (disambiguation)
- Professor Griff (born 1960), American rapper in the group Public Enemy
- Professor Longhair (1918–1980), American New Orleans blues pianist
- Casey Stengel ("The Old Perfesser") (1890–1975), American baseball player and manager
