= Nebria boschi =

Scientific classification
- Domain: Eukaryota
- Kingdom: Animalia
- Phylum: Arthropoda
- Class: Insecta
- Order: Coleoptera
- Suborder: Adephaga
- Family: Carabidae
- Genus: Nebria
- Species: N. boschi

Binomial name
- Nebria boschi Winkler, 1949

Species of beetle

Nebria boschi is a metal coloured species of ground beetle in the Nebriinae subfamily that is endemic to Germany.
