= Professor T. =

Professor T. may refer to:

- Professor T. (Belgian TV series) – the original series, which ran for 3 seasons in 2015, 2016 and 2018 (titled simply "T" in Masterpiece Theatre's US airing).
- Professor T. (German TV series) – 2017 remake.
- Professor T. (British TV series) – 2021 remake airing on ITV and Britbox.
