= Boshi =

Boshi may refer to:

- The Chinese word for the holder of a doctorate-level degree (博士), as transcribed in Hanyu Pinyin. See Doctor (title).
- The Chinese word for a court academician during the Han dynasty, which is written and pronounced the same way. See Translation of Han dynasty titles.
- Bōshi (帽子), a Japanese television special about an elderly man who runs an old haberdashery in Kure.
