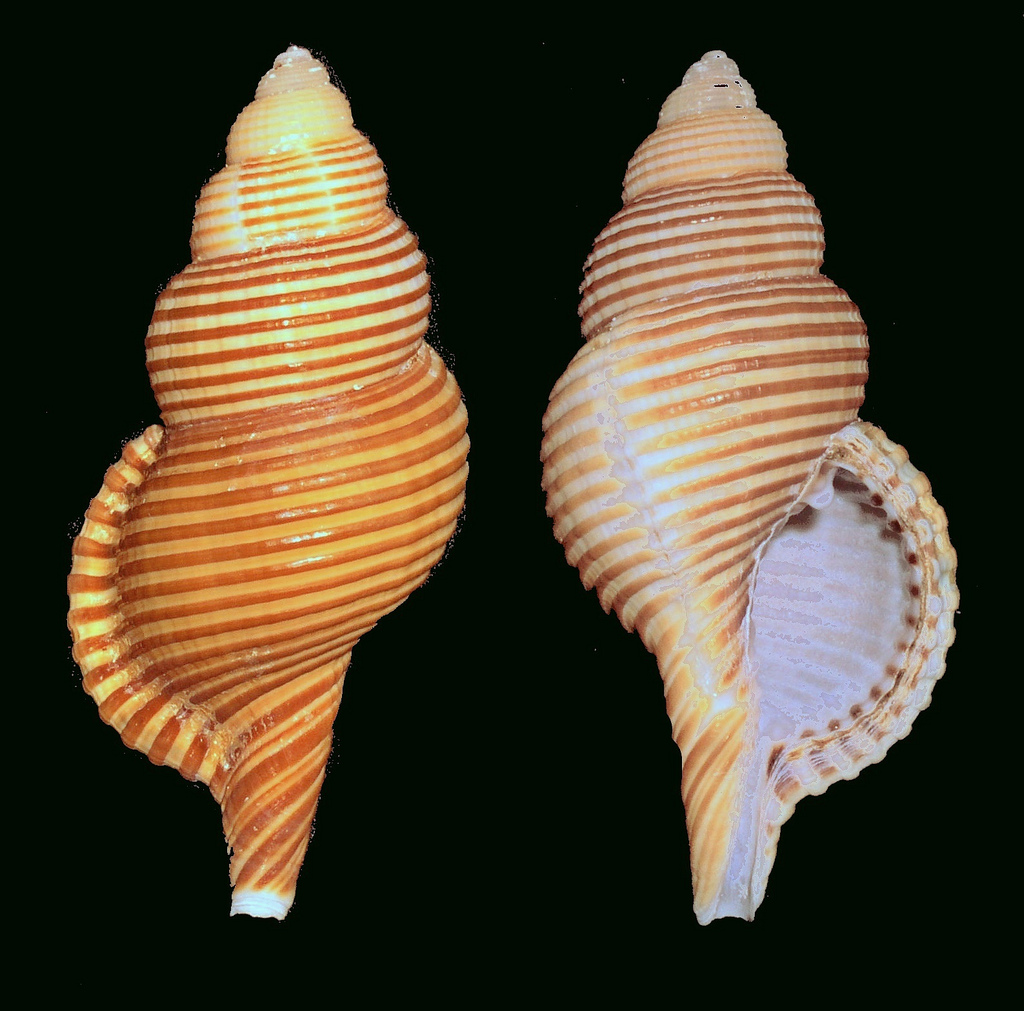
- shell of Gelagna succincta

Scientific classification
- Kingdom: Animalia
- Phylum: Mollusca
- Class: Gastropoda
- Subclass: Caenogastropoda
- Order: Littorinimorpha
- Family: Cymatiidae
- Genus: Gelagna; Schaufuss, 1869

Type species
- Triton clandestinus Lamarck, 1816

Synonyms
- Linatella (Gelagna) Schaufuss, 1869; Paralagena Dall, 1904; Ranularia (Lagena) Mörch, 1852 (Invalid: junior homonym of Lagena Röding, 1798 and Lagena Schumacher, 1817; Gelagna and Paralagena are replacement names)

= Gelagna =

Genus of gastropods

Gelagna is a genus of predatory sea snails, marine gastropod mollusks in the family Cymatiidae.

== Species ==
Species within the genus Gelagna include:

- Gelagna pallida (Parth, 1996)
- Gelagna succincta (Linnaeus, 1771)
