= Luigi Pavese =

Italian actor (1897–1969)

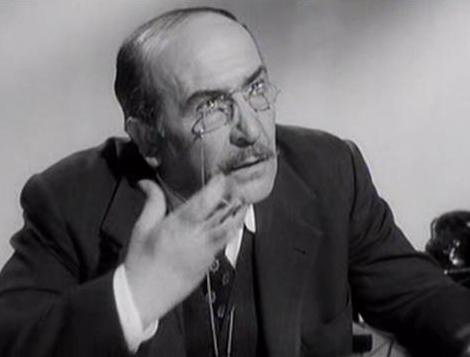
- Pavese in Lo scocciatore (Via Padova 46) (1953)
- Born: 25 October 1897; Asti, Italy
- Died: 13 December 1969 (aged 72); Rome, Italy
- Occupations: Actor; voice actor
- Years active: 1916–1969
- Relatives: Nino Pavese (brother); Paila Pavese (niece)

Luigi Pavese (25 October 1897 – 13 December 1969) was an Italian actor and voice actor.

== Biography ==
Born in Asti, Pavese started his career in 1916 working as a silent film actor at 19 years of age. He had his theatrical debut in 1921 and eventually worked his way up to becoming a film actor by the 1930s. He appeared in more than 170 films between 1916 and 1969. By the time World War II ended, Pavese's popularity as an actor had increased. He often portrayed characters with professions such as clerks, lawyers, soldiers, officers and notaries in comedy films and made frequent collaborations with other actors such as Totò, Aldo Fabrizi, Walter Chiari, Alberto Sordi, including his younger brother Nino Pavese.

As a voice actor, Pavese dubbed the voices of characters into the Italian language. He was the official voice actor of Fernando Sancho, Robert Strauss and many more. He even provided the Italian voices of animated characters belonging to The Walt Disney Company, most notably Colonel Hathi in The Jungle Book as well as Boris in Lady and the Tramp and a Labrador in One Hundred and One Dalmatians.

Pavese died in Rome of a heart attack in the morning of 13 December 1969 at the age of 72.

== Selected filmography ==
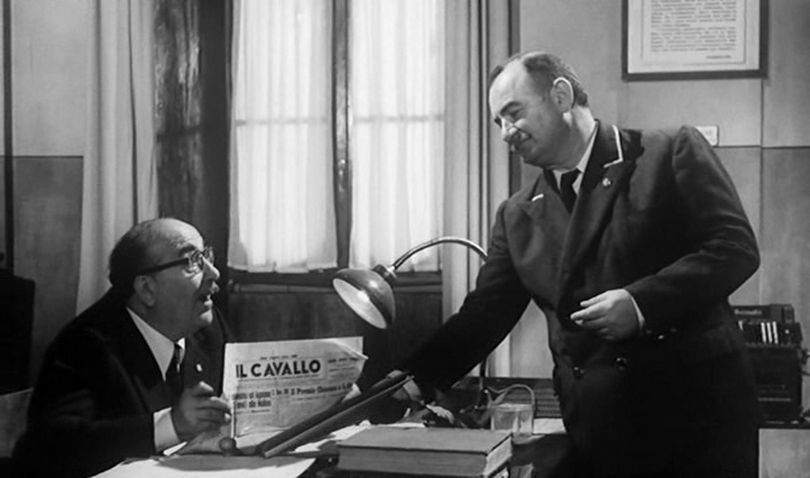
Pavese (left) with Ciccio Barbi in Il mio amico Benito (1962)

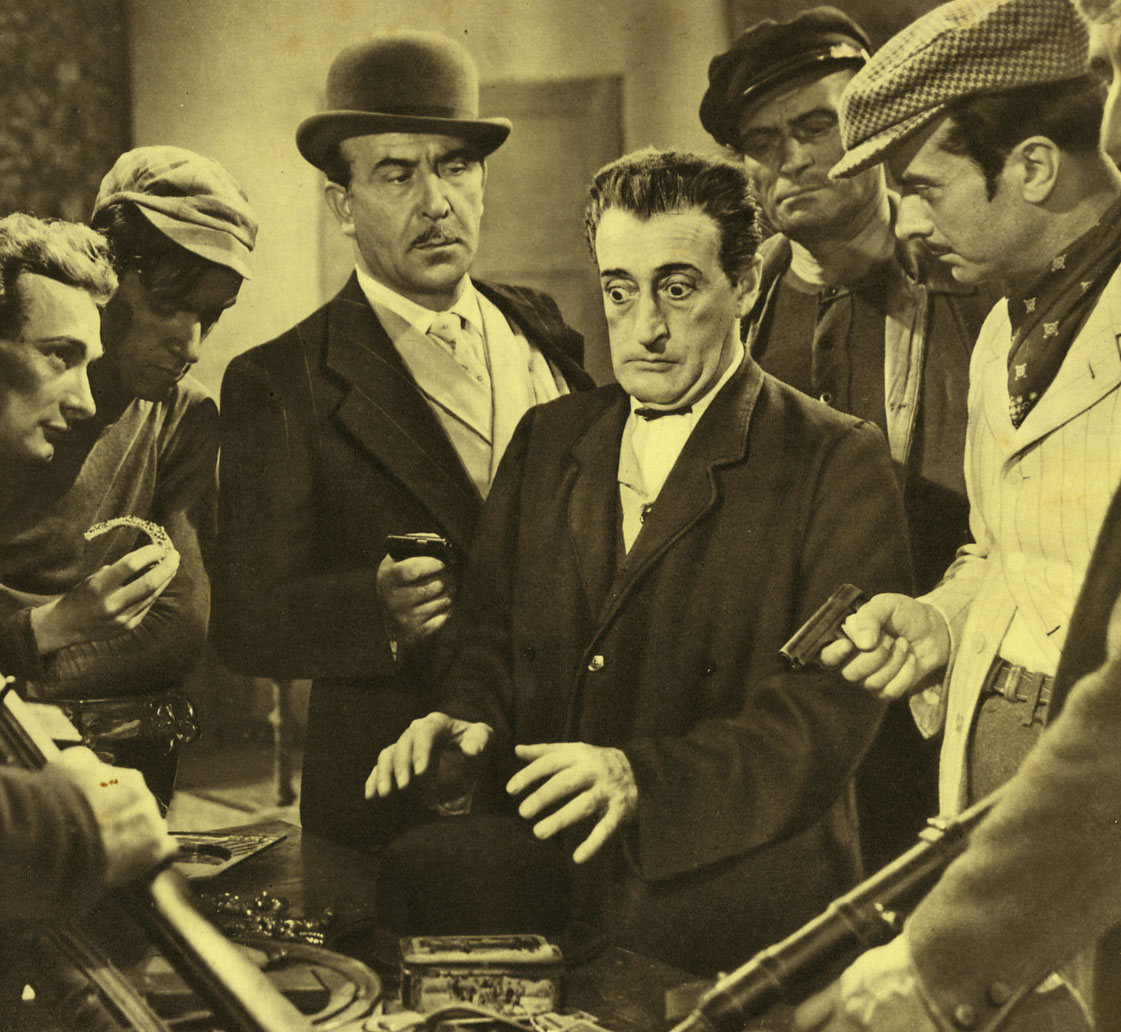
Pavese (left) with Totò in Totò Le Mokò (1949)

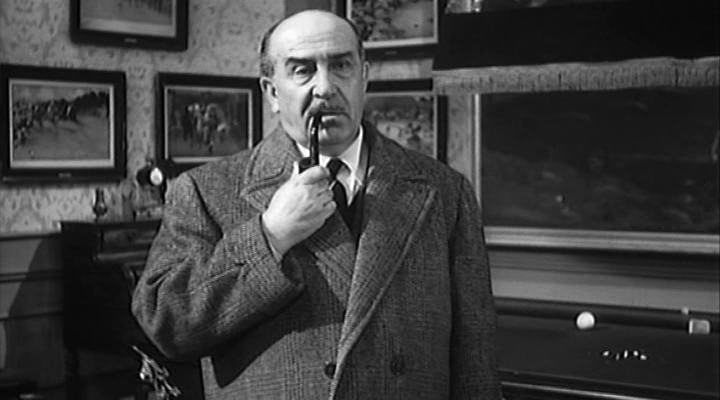
Pavese in Totò Diabolicus (1962)

- The Sinful Woman (1916)
- La vampa (1916)
- Senza pietà (1921) as Barcbi
- Avventuriero di California (1921)
- Il castello del terrore (1922)
- I milioni della gitana (1922)
- Lo strano viaggio di Pim-Popo (1922) – Harry Fowell
- Il miraggio di mezzanotte (1922)
- Lo zio si sposa (1923)
- Red Passport (1935)
- Aldebaran (1935) – Nora's friend
- Golden Arrow (1935) – Ellis – l'ambasciatore
- The Joker King (1936) – Captain Alliana
- La Damigella di Bard (1936) – Avvocato Palmieri
- Joe the Red (1936) – Stefano di Sandelle Lafitte
- Vivere! (1936)
- Doctor Antonio (1937) – Aubrey
- At Your Orders, Madame (1939) – Il maître d'hotel
- Ho visto brillare le stelle (1939) – Rocchi
- Cose dell'altro mondo (1939) – Cook, il capitano di polizia
- Una lampada alla finestra (1940) – Max
- Antonio Meucci (1940) – Antonio Meucci
- L'arcidiavolo (1940) – Carlo
- The Hussar Captain (1940)
- La fanciulla di Portici (1940) – Il principe Fernando di San Vitale
- Eternal Melodies (1940) – Leopoldo Mozart
- Orizzonte dipinto (1941) – L'uomo nero coi baffi
- The Happy Ghost (1941) – Temistocle
- Il pozzo dei miracoli (1941) – Il banchiere Holosy
- Beatrice Cenci (1941) – Catalano
- The Secret Lover (1941) – Melchiorri
- Pirates of Malaya (1941) – Sandokan
- The Two Tigers (1941) – Sandokan
- A Woman Has Fallen (1941) – Fabbri
- Soltanto un bacio (1942) – Volitor, l'equilibrista
- The Two Orphans (1942)
- Gioco pericoloso (1942)
- M.A.S. (1942) – Il commendator Farese
- Luisa Sanfelice (1942)
- Malombra (1942) – Il professore Binda
- La fanciulla dell'altra riva (1942) – Joe Manners, il poliziotto
- Knights of the Desert (1942) – El-Burnì
- Il nemico (1943) – L'ispettore capo Pietro Stoll
- Redemption (1943)
- Harlem (1943) – Joe Smith
- Special Correspondents (1943) – Un colonnello
- Gente dell'aria (1943) – Il maggiore Arnaldi
- Grattacieli (1943) – Pietro Stoll, l'ispettore di polizia
- 4 ragazze sognano (1943) – Nicola Dupont, ex-ufficiale giudiziaro
- Non mi muovo! (1943) – Il commendator Strabotta
- Silenzio, si gira! (1943) – Il signore stonato
- Enrico IV (1943) – Il conte Tito Belcredi
- Gli assi della risata (1943) – Bandini (segment "Il trionfo di Poppea")
- The Za-Bum Circus (1944) – (segment "Galop finale al circo")
- La Fornarina (1944) – Sebastiano Del Piombo
- The Priest's Hat (1944) – Il giudice Martellini
- Finalmente sì (1944) – Il salumiere
- L'uomo del romanzo (1944) – Zio Giulio
- The Ten Commandments (1945) – (segment "Onora il padre e la madre")
- His Young Wife (1945) – Il capo sezione
- Black Eagle (1946) – Un servo
- L'atleta di cristallo (1946)
- Crime News (1947)
- Tombolo (1947) – Pugliese
- Le avventure di Pinocchio (1947) – Mastro Ciliegia
- Genoveva de Brabante (1947)
- Lost in the Dark (1947) – Frantz Cardillo
- Caccia all'uomo (1948) – Thenardier
- Les Misérables (1948) – Thenardier
- Heart and Soul (1948) – Maestro Lari
- The Street Has Many Dreams (1948) – Il commendatore Giulio Carocci
- Fear and Sand (1948) – Doctor
- Toto Tours Italy (1948) – Enrico
- Guarany (1948) – Papà Gomez
- Anthony of Padua (1949) – Don Luigi
- The Iron Swordsman (1949) – Sismondi
- A Night of Fame (1949) – Soviet Delegate
- Toto Looks for a House (1949) – Capo ufficio
- Totò Le Mokò (1949) – François
- Snow White and the Seven Thieves (1949) – Commendator Casertoni
- I peggiori anni della nostra vita (1949)
- The Merry Widower (1949) – Il commissario dell'Interpol
- Toto Looks for a Wife (1950) – Il signor Bellavista
- Barrier to the North (1950) – Il direttore dell'albergo
- The Elusive Twelve (1950) – Umberto
- Figaro Here, Figaro There (1950) – Pedro, bandit chieftain
- Totò Tarzan (1950) – Il procuratore generale
- Bluebeard's Six Wives (1950) – Lucas
- Beauties on Bicycles (1951) – Radiocronista
- I'm the Capataz (1951) – Erasmo
- Mamma Mia, What an Impression! (1951) – Il giudice di gara
- The Count of Saint Elmo (1951) (uncredited)
- Napoleon (1951)
- Tragic Serenade (1951)
- La grande rinuncia (1951)
- La paura fa 90 (1951) – L'impresario
- Una bruna indiavolata! (1951) – Commissario
- Amor non ho... però... però (1951) – Antonio Scutipizzo
- The Passaguai Family (1951) – The Man with the Watermelon
- Free Escape (1951)
- Viva il cinema! (1952)
- The Passaguai Family Gets Rich (1952) – The former Actor Gardini
- The Dream of Zorro (1952) – Don Garcia Fernandez
- Torment of the Past (1952) – Comm. Bianchi
- Toto in Color (1952) – Tiscordi, l'editore
- The Black Mask (1952)
- Papà diventa mamma (1952) – Mago Bhorman
- Mademoiselle Gobete (1952) – Tricoin, il presidente
- I, Hamlet (1952) – Re Claudio / Fantasma del padre
- Il tallone di Achille (1952) – Dott. Paridi
- Lieutenant Giorgio (1952)
- Lulu (1953) – Stefano
- Via Padova 46 (1953) – The Office Manager
- Frine, Courtesan of Orient (1953) – Guerriero
- Cinema d'altri tempi (1953) – Il Produttore
- Dieci canzoni d'amore da salvare (1953) – Signor Crudi
- Sua altezza ha detto: no! (1953) – Luigi Rovere – L'impresario
- La grande avventura (1954)
- Of Life and Love (1954) – Colonel Franco Alonzo (segment "Marsina Stretta")
- The Cheerful Squadron (1954) – Il capitano medico
- Loves of Three Queens (1954) – Romani (segment "Framing Story")
- The Lovers of Manon Lescaut (1954) – Il mercante premuroso
- L'eterna femmina (1954)
- Farewell, My Beautiful Lady (1954) – Giuseppe
- Tripoli, Beautiful Land of Love (1954) – Marshal Nerone
- I cavalieri dell'illusione (1954)
- Eighteen Year Olds (1955) – Il professore di greco
- Io sono la Primula Rossa (1955) – James
- The Band of Honest Men (1956) – Ragionier Casoria
- Totò lascia o raddoppia? (1956) – Barkeeper
- Una pelliccia di visone (1956) – Store manager
- Le schiave di Cartagine (1956) – Publio Cornelio
- The Lady Doctor (1957) – Il capo dell'agenzia investigativa
- The Italians They Are Crazy (1958) – Maggiore Masi
- El hombre del paraguas blanco (1958) – Don Antonio
- Legs of Gold (1958) – commendatore Renzoni
- Valeria ragazza poco seria (1958) – Father of Valeria
- Toto in Paris (1958) – Calogero Tempesta
- Mia nonna poliziotto (1958) – Commissario
- Promesse di marinaio (1958) – Nostromo Tortora
- Toto in Madrid (1959) – Chief Constable
- Ciao, ciao bambina! (1959) – L'industriale Branca
- La duchessa di Santa Lucia (1959) – Il giudice
- La cento chilometri (1959) – Sor Eliseo
- La cambiale (1959) – Padrone di casa
- Perfide.... ma belle (1959) – Commissario
- I baccanali di Tiberio (1960) – Sergente Vinicio
- Il Mattatore (1960) – L'industriale
- Tough Guys (1960) – The Customs Officer
- Gentlemen Are Born (1960) – Bernasconi
- Call Girls of Rome (1960) – Baldoni
- Toto, Fabrizi and the Young People Today (1960) – Il commendator La Sarta
- My Friend, Dr. Jekyll (1960) – Il Col. Rolando
- Little Girls and High Finance (1960)
- Chi si ferma è perduto (1960) – Cesare Santoro
- Ferragosto in bikini (1960) – Leopoldo Cazzaniga
- Cerasella (1961) – Generale Bruno Coscia
- Bellezze sulla spiaggia (1961) – Padre di Franco
- Totòtruffa 62 (1961) – Terlizzi
- I soliti rapinatori a Milano (1961)
- The Orderly (1961) – Colonnello Terenzi
- Scandali al mare (1961) – Salvatore Pecchia
- Le magnifiche 7 (1961) – Il commendator Olivieri
- Gerarchi si muore (1961) – Ambrogio Merletti
- Rocco e le sorelle (1961)
- Mina... fuori la guardia (1961) – The Colonel
- Toto vs. Maciste (1962) – Proprietario Locale
- Toto Diabolicus (1962) – Commissario di Polizia
- Toto and Peppino Divided in Berlin (1962) – Un generale russo
- Le massaggiatrici (1962) – Manzini
- I motorizzati (1962) – Il capo ufficio
- Il mio amico Benito (1962) – Pieroni
- The Shortest Day (1963) – Giudice della corte marziale (uncredited)
- Uno strano tipo (1963) – M. Mazzolani
- Divorzio alla siciliana (1963) – Il commissario
- Le tardone (1964) – Cionci (episode "L'armadio")
- Toto of Arabia (1965) – Lo sceicco di Shamara (uncredited)
- How We Got into Trouble with the Army (1965) – General MacKee
- Veneri al sole (1965) – Il padre di Raimondo (segment "Come conquistare le donne")
- Spiaggia libera (1966) – Il Colonnello
- Due mafiosi contro Al Capone (1966) – Comandate di polizia
- For a Few Dollars Less (1966) – Miguel's Father
- I due sanculotti (1966) – François
- May God Forgive You... But I Won't (1968) – Stuart

== Voice work ==
Year	Title	Role	Notes
1965	West and Soda	Ursus	Animated film
1972	The Adventures of Pinocchio	The Tuna Fish	Animated film (posthumous release)

=== Dubbing ===
==== Films (Animation, Italian dub) ====
Year	Title	Role(s)	Ref
1948	Dumbo	Clown #2	
1955	Lady and the Tramp	Boris	
1960	Alakazam the Great	King Gruesome	
1960	Goliath II	Goliath I	
1961	One Hundred and One Dalmatians	Labrador	
1966	Winnie the Pooh and the Honey Tree	Eeyore	
1967	The Jungle Book	Colonel Hathi	
1968	Asterix and Cleopatra	Barbarossa	
1968	Winnie the Pooh and the Blustery Day	Eeyore	

==== Films (Live action, Italian dub) ====
- God in The Ten Commandments
- The Cowardly Lion / "Zeke" in The Wizard of Oz
- Carrancho in Man from Canyon City
- Luther Ackenthorpe in Murder, She Said
- Sergeant McClusky in Jumping Jacks
- Mr. Kruhulik in The Seven Year Itch
- Stanislas "Animal" Kuzawa in Stalag 17
- Nick in It's a Wonderful Life
- Zero Schwiefka in The Man with the Golden Arm
- Balthazar in Ben-Hur
- Miguel in Seven Guns for the MacGregors
- M in Goldfinger
- Sam Carraclough in Lassie Come Home
- John P. Clum in Gunfight at the O.K. Corral
- Zebulon Prescott in How the West Was Won
- Colonel Manfred von Holstein in Those Magnificent Men in their Flying Machines
- Whitey Krause in The Helen Morgan Story
- Culpepper in In Harm's Way
- Silas Meacham in Fort Apache
- Jake in Curtain Call at Cactus Creek
- J.P. Norton in Air Raid Wardens
- Grumpy in The Errand Boy
- Harvey "Big Daddy" Pollitt in Cat on a Hot Tin Roof
- Big Han in Blood Alley
