= Papà diventa mamma =

- Directed by: Aldo Fabrizi
- Written by: Mario Amendola; Aldo Fabrizi; Ruggero Maccari
- Cinematography: Mario Bava
- Music by: Carlo Innocenzi
- Distributed by: Variety Distribution
- Release date: 1952
- Country: Italy
- Language: Italian

Papà diventa mamma is a 1952 Italian comedy film written, directed, produced and starred by Aldo Fabrizi. The production company was Alfa Film XXXVII.

== Cast ==
- Aldo Fabrizi: Sor Peppe
- Ave Ninchi: Margherita, wife of Peppe
- Giovanna Ralli: Marcella
- Carlo Delle Piane: Pecorino
- Giancarlo Zarfati: Gnappetta
- Paolo Stoppa: Il medico
- Marco Tulli: Ipnotizzato pugile
- Virgilio Riento:Ambrogio
- Luigi Pavese: Il Mago Bhorman
- Enrico Luzi: L'uomo che Balbetta
- Franco Giacobini: Il passeggero sul Tram
- Alfredo Rizzo
