= I pappagalli =

- Directed by: Bruno Paolinelli
- Written by: Peppino De Filippo; Aldo Fabrizi; Ruggero Maccari; Bruno Paolinelli; Ettore Scola
- Cinematography: Arturo Gallea
- Music by: Carlo Innocenzi
- Release date: 1955
- Country: Italy
- Language: Italian

I pappagalli (The Parrots) is a 1955 Italian comedy film directed by Bruno Paolinelli.

== Cast ==
- Aldo Fabrizi: Antonio
- Alberto Sordi: Alberto Tanzi
- Maria Fiore: Caterina
- Maria Pia Casilio: Fulvia
- Peppino De Filippo: Beppi
- Titina De Filippo: wife of Antonio
- Elsa Merlini: Antonietta
- Cosetta Greco: Giulietta
- Madeleine Fischer: Liliana, Alberto's wife
- Gianrico Tedeschi: The painter
- Carlo Delle Piane: The corporal
- Laura Gore
- Marco Tulli
- Raffaele Pisu
- Maria Grazia Francia
