= Ada Colangeli =

Italian character actress

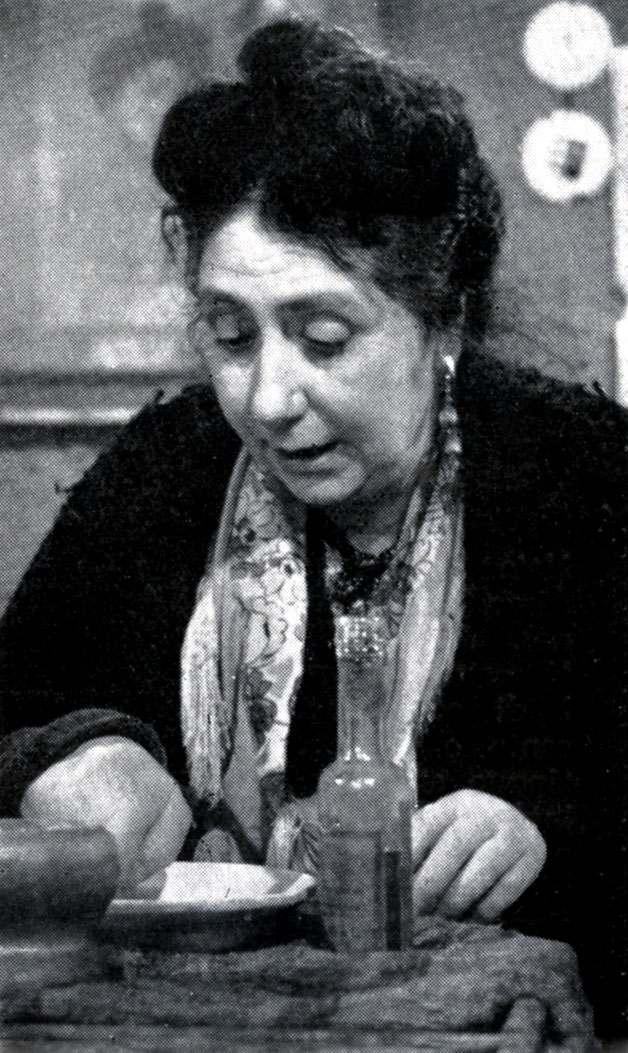
- Born: 5 March 1913; Rome, Kingdom of Italy
- Died: 29 February 1992 (aged 78); Rome, Italy
- Occupation: Actress

Ada Colangeli (5 March 1913 – 29 February 1992) was an Italian character actress.

== Life and career ==
Born on 5 March 1913 in Rome, Colangeli began acting in the early 1940s, and she was mainly cast in roles of women from a low social class. Active for about twenty years, she often collaborated with the director Alessandro Blasetti, of whom she was a real life friend. Her credits also include works by Federico Fellini, Luigi Zampa, Luigi Comencini, Carlo Lizzani and Mario Camerini.

She died on the leap day of 1992, five days before her 79th birthday.

== Selected filmography ==
- An Adventure of Salvator Rosa (1939) – Una popolana
- One Hundred Thousand Dollars (1940) – Francesca, la moglie di Paul
- The Iron Crown (1941) - (uncredited)
- Four Steps in the Clouds (1942) – Anna – La serva (uncredited)
- Dagli Appennini alle Ande (1943)
- Apparition (1943) – Geltrude
- Nessuno torna indietro (1945) – Una sorvegliante
- Un giorno nella vita (1946) – Suor Gaetana
- Alarm Bells (1949) – Francesca
- The Bride Can't Wait (1949) – Sister Celeste
- Maracatumba... ma non è una rumba! (1949) – Domestica del conte
- Welcome, Reverend! (1950)
- His Last Twelve Hours (1950) – La direttrice del collegio (uncredited)
- È arrivato il cavaliere! (1950) – (uncredited)
- Strano appuntamento (1950)
- Rome-Paris-Rome (1951) – Assunta
- Una bruna indiavolata! (1951) – Caterina
- The City Stands Trial (1952) – The Maid at Tortorella's (uncredited)
- The Shameless Sex (1952) – Portinaia
- Lieutenant Giorgio (1952) – Evelina (uncredited)
- Il romanzo della mia vita (1952) – (uncredited)
- Una croce senza nome (1952)
- Er fattaccio (1952)
- Carne inquieta (1952)
- Prisoner in the Tower of Fire (1952) – L'ancella
- La voce del silenzio (1953) – (uncredited)
- One of Those (1953) – (uncredited)
- Anni facili (1953)
- Via Padova 46 (1953) – The Woman Who Gets Out of the Lift (uncredited)
- Pane, amore e fantasia (1953) – Una comare intrigante (uncredited)
- Chronicle of Poor Lovers (1954) – Fidalma
- A Slice of Life (1954) – (segment "Casa d'altri")
- Papà Pacifico (1954)
- Disonorata - Senza colpa (1954) – Madre di Amedeo
- Woman of Rome (1954) – Padrona della pensione
- La Luciana (1954)
- Too Bad She's Bad (1954) – Una signora al commissariato (uncredited)
- The Art of Getting Along (1954) – Cameriera dei gesuiti (uncredited)
- Le signorine dello 04 (1955) – The Caretaker (uncredited)
- Il bidone (1955) – Minor Role (uncredited)
- The Belle of Rome (1955) – Vicina di casa di Gracco (uncredited)
- Bravissimo (1955) – Woman with a tall Candle (uncredited)
- Girls of Today (1955) – Filomena
- Revelation (1955) – Rosa (uncredited)
- Lucky to Be a Woman (1956) – Minor Role (uncredited)
- The Bigamist (1956) – Minor Role (uncredited)
- The Intruder (1956) – Caterina (uncredited)
- Difendo il mio amore (1956) – Minor Role (uncredited)
- I calunniatori (1956)
- Marisa (1957) – (uncredited)
- Ladro lui, ladra lei (1958) – Poplana alla finestra (uncredited)
- Nel blu dipinto di blu (1959) – Sor Napoleone's Wife (uncredited) (final film role)
