= Giovanni Grasso =

Italian actor

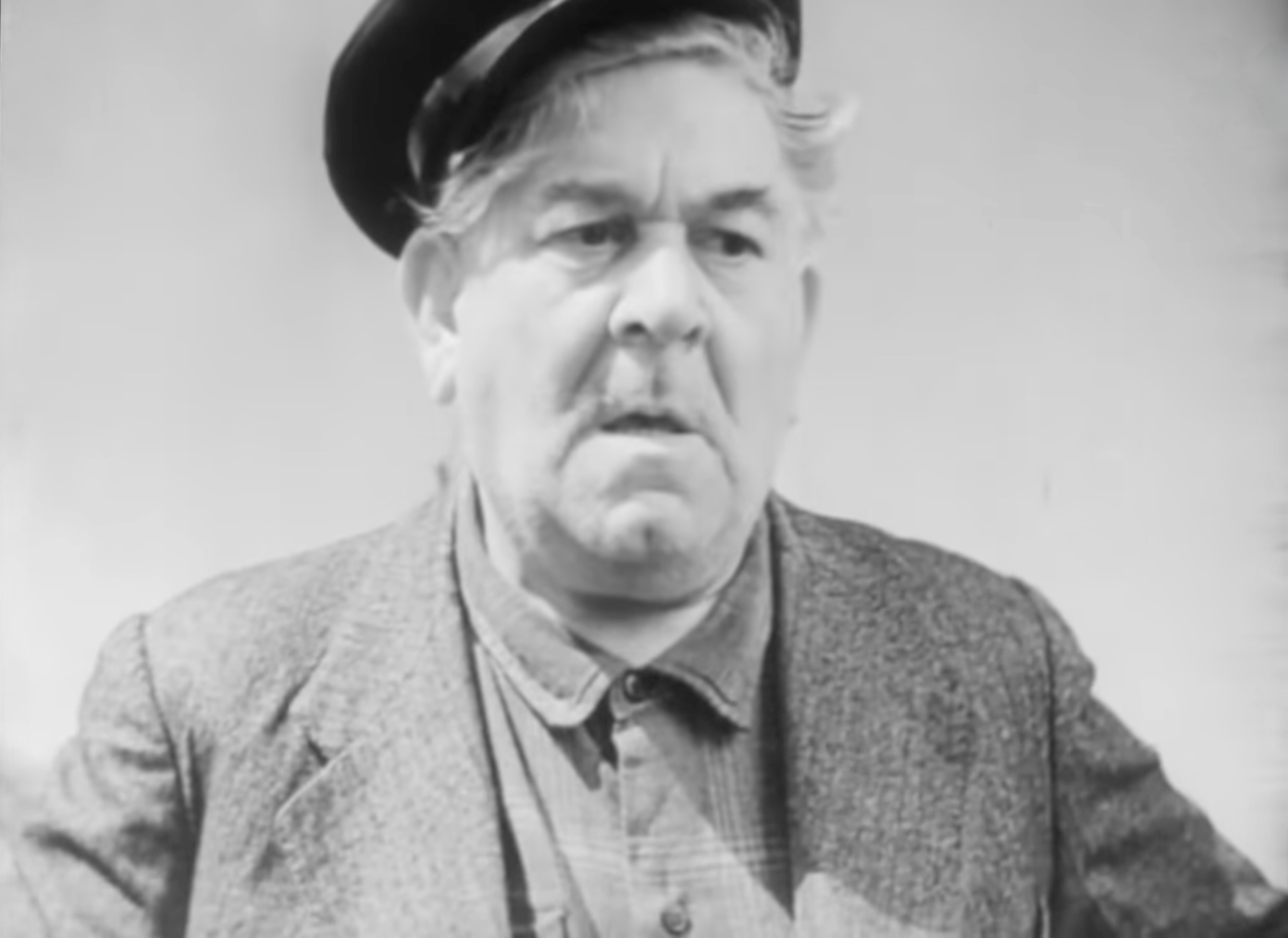
- Grasso in For the Love of Mariastella (1946)
- Born: 11 November 1888; Catania, Sicily, Italy
- Died: 30 April 1963 (aged 74); Catania, Sicily, Italy
- Occupation: Actor
- Years active: 1910–1955

Giovanni Grasso (11 November 1888 – 30 April 1963) was an Italian stage and film actor. He appeared in more than 80 films between 1910 and 1955. He was born and died in Catania, Sicily, Italy. Born into a family of marionettists, he was cousin and namesake of Giovanni Grasso, a respected stage actor specialized in the Sicilian language repertoire, so he assumed at the beginning of his career the stage name "Giovanni Grasso Junior" to stand out. He was mainly active on stage, often acting together with his wife, Virginia Balestrieri.

== Selected filmography ==
- I naufraghi (1914)
- Il lupo (1917)
- Sole! (1918)
- Il lampionaro del Ponte Vecchio (1918)
- Nennella (1919)
- Skeletros (1920)
- The Telephone Operator (1932) - Gedeone
- Port (1934) - Nicola Bellamonte
- Sentinels of Bronze (1937) - Sergente Amato
- Under the Southern Cross (1938) - Marco, il capo della piantagione
- Piccoli naufraghi (1939) - Il 'commandante'
- No Man's Land (1939) - Il puparo
- La grande luce - Montevergine (1939) - Pasquale
- Traversata nera (1939)
- Piccolo hotel (1939) - Il dottor Kralik
- Il ladro (1939) - Zio Gigio
- Los hijos de la noche (1939) - Tabernero
- Backstage (1939) - Il commissario
- La conquista dell'aria (1939) - Contadino che assiste al volo
- The Secret of Villa Paradiso (1940) - Gorman
- L'uomo della legione (1940) - Un meccanico del cantiere
- Il signore della taverna (1940) - Il taverniere
- Mare (1940) - Liborio, il capitano
- La leggenda azzurra (1940) - Il padre adottivo di Scilla
- I pirati del golfo (1940)
- Ragazza che dorme (1941) - Marco, il padrone del mulino
- Il vetturale del San Gottardo (1941) - Mastro Antonio, il vetturale
- I Live as I Please (1942) - Il dottore
- Yes, Madam (1942) - Il commendator Bracco-Rinaldi
- Bengasi (1942) - (scenes deleted)
- We the Living (1942) - Stephan Tishenko
- Luisa Sanfelice (1942)
- Don Cesare di Bazan (1942) - Don José di Nogueira
- Madrid de mis sueños (1942) - Carlos Aguilera
- Quarta pagina (1942)
- Il fanciullo del West (1942) - Donovan
- Harlem (1943) - Guardascione
- Two Hearts Among the Beasts (1943) - Il capo-cuoco
- La carica degli eroi (1943)
- The Priest's Hat (1944) - L'avvocato Francesco Scuoto
- The Gates of Heaven (1945) - Il commerciante paralitico
- All'ombra della gloria (1945) - Il frate
- The Ten Commandments (1945)
- Chi l'ha visto? (1945)
- For the Love of Mariastella (1946) - Raìs Pietro
- The Great Dawn (1947) - Oreste Bellotti
- Bullet for Stefano (1947) - Lazzanni
- Il principe ribelle (1947)
- Eleonora Duse (1947) - impresario Schurman
- Ruy Blas (1948) - Don Gaspar Guritan
- Sono io l'assassino (1948)
- Legge di sangue (1948) - Il padre di Alberto
- Difficult Years (1948) - L'avvocato Mascali
- Vento d'Africa (1949)
- Flying Squadron (1949) - Capo Dei Contadini
- La figlia del peccato (1949) - padron Giuseppe
- Welcome, Reverend! (1950)
- Margaret of Cortona (1950) - Tancredi, padre di Margherita
- Prima comunione (1950)
- The Fighting Men (1950) - Saverio Luparello
- Fugitive in Trieste (1951)
- Tragic Serenade (1951)
- The Passaguai Family (1951)
- What Price Innocence? (1952) - suocero di Stefano
- In Olden Days (1952) - Presidente del tribunale (segment "Il processo di Frine")
- La città canora (1952) - Don Salvatore Morelli
- Immortal Melodies (1952) - Domenico Mascagni
- Una croce senza nome (1952)
- Too Young for Love (1953)
- Easy Years (1953) - L'onorevole Michele Rapisarda
- Cuore di spia (1953)
- Of Life and Love (1954) - The doorman (segment "Marsina Stretta")
- Toto and Carolina (1955) - Commissario (uncredited)
- Magic Village (1955) - Sindaco
- Onore e sangue (1957) - The Public Prosecutor
