= The Overtaxed =

- Directed by: Steno
- Written by: Aldo Fabrizi; Roberto Gianviti; Steno; Vittorio Metz; Ruggero Maccari
- Produced by: C.E.I.
- Starring: Totò; Louis de Funès; Aldo Fabrizi
- Cinematography: Marco Scarpelli
- Edited by: Eraldo Da Roma
- Music by: Piero Piccioni
- Distributed by: Gaumont Distribution (France)
- Release date: 29 July 1959 (France)
- Running time: 105 minutes; 89 (France)
- Countries: Italy; France
- Language: Italian

I Tartassati is an Italian comedy film from 1959, directed by Stefano Vanzina, written by Aldo Fabrizi, starring Totò and Louis de Funès. The film is known under the titles The Overtaxed (English) and Fripouillard et Compagnie (French).

== Plot ==
Mr. Pezzella (Totò) owns and runs a successful luxury clothes shop. He does not like to pay taxes, and he resorts to the services of a tax consultant (interpreted by Louis de Funès) in order minimize this expense and exploit every loophole. Unfortunately for Pezzella, the Borders and Revenue police (Guardia di Finanza) suspects his high income, and orders an inspection by marshal Topponi (Aldo Fabrizi) and brigadier Bardi. Pezzella is advised by his incompetent tax consultant to try bribing the marshal in every possible way. Pezzella's clumsy attempts and intrusiveness create many misunderstandings and comedic situations. The honest marshal remains unaffected and completes his report, which would force Pezzella to pay a heavy 15 million lire fine.

As a last resort, Pezzella manages to steal the marshal's bag, with all the official documents on which the inspection is based. But in the end, perhaps moved by pity for Topponi, who will get in trouble with his superiors if unable to produce the documents and has become over time a familiar figure and is revealed to also be the father of Pezzella's son's love interest, the rich shop owner decides to follow instead his conscience and to return the bag, facing any charges.

== Cast ==
- Totò: Torquato Pezzella, director of magazine "Tessuti"
- Aldo Fabrizi: Fabio Topponi, the polyvalent fiscal inspector
- Louis de Funès: Hector "Ettore" Curto, conseiller fiscal
- Anna Campori: Dora Pezzella
- Miranda Campa: L'épouse de Fabio
- Luciano Marin: Augustin "Tino" Pezzella
- Ciccio Barbi: the brigadier
- Anna Maria Bottini: Mara
- Cathia Caro: Laura, the girl of Topponi
- Jacques Dufilho: the director of the prison
- Elena Fabrizi: Une infirmière
- Ignazio Leone: the guard - village
- Fernand Sardou: Ernesto Topponi, l'oncle de Laura
- Jean Bellanger: the security guard of the prison
- Miranda Campa: L'épouse de fabio
- Nando Bruno: L'Ubracio
- Piera Arico
- Gianni Cobelli
- Mario Corbelli
- Cesare Fantoni
- Lamberto Antinori
