= I prepotenti =

1957 film directed by Mario Amendola

- Directed by: Mario Amendola
- Written by: Aldo Fabrizi; Mario Amendola; Ruggero Maccari
- Cinematography: Carlo Carlini
- Music by: Gino Filippini
- Distributed by: Variety Distribution
- Release date: 1958
- Country: Italy
- Language: Italian

I prepotenti (lit. The Bullies) is a 1958 Italian comedy film directed by Mario Amendola. It has a sequel, Prepotenti più di prima (1959).

== Cast ==
- Aldo Fabrizi: Cesare Pinelli
- Nino Taranto: Domenico Esposito, aka Mimì
- Ave Ninchi: Clelia Pinelli
- Wandisa Guida: Marcella Pinelli
- Luca Ronconi: Gennarino Esposito
- Giuseppe Porelli: Commissioner
- Carlo Taranto: Numa
- Ferruccio Amendola: Alfredo Pinelli
- Clara Bindi: Carmela Esposito
- Rosita Pisano: Aunt Rosa
- Mario Riva: Vigile
