= Prepotenti più di prima =

1959 Italian comedy film

- Film poster
- Directed by: Mario Mattoli
- Written by: Mario Amendola; Aldo Fabrizi; Ruggero Maccari
- Produced by: Alberto Amorosi
- Starring: Aldo Fabrizi
- Cinematography: Gábor Pogány
- Edited by: Antonietta Zita
- Music by: Gino Filippini
- Distributed by: Variety Distribution
- Release date: 1959
- Running time: 89 minutes
- Country: Italy
- Language: Italian

Prepotenti più di prima (More Bullies Than Before) is a 1959 Italian comedy film directed by Mario Mattoli and starring Aldo Fabrizi. It is the sequel of I prepotenti.

== Plot ==
On her return from the honeymoon, Marcella finds out she is expecting a baby. The future grandparents argue again about where the baby is to be born and the choice of a name. The newlyweds, tired of the quarrels, decide to flee to Milan with their baby.

== Cast ==
- Aldo Fabrizi - Cesare Pinelli
- Nino Taranto - Domenico Esposito
- Ave Ninchi - Clelia Pinelli
- Luca Ronconi - Gennarino Esposito
- Alice Sandro - Marcella
- Virgilio Riento - Il maresciallo
- Margherita Bagni - La signora Esposito
- Ferruccio Amendola - Alfredo Pinelli
- Anna Campori - Signora Norma
- Alberto Sorrentino - Mimmo
- Nino Vingelli - Il barista
