= The Passaguai Family Gets Rich =

1952 film

- Directed by: Aldo Fabrizi
- Written by: Anton Germano Rossi; Aldo Fabrizi; Mario Amendola; Ruggero Maccari
- Produced by: Aldo Fabrizi
- Starring: Aldo Fabrizi; Erminio Macario; Ave Ninchi; Giovanna Ralli
- Cinematography: Mario Bava
- Edited by: Nella Nannuzzi
- Music by: Carlo Innocenzi
- Production company: Alfa Film
- Distributed by: Variety Distribution
- Release date: 7 March 1952
- Running time: 96 minutes
- Country: Italy
- Language: Italian

The Passaguai Family Gets Rich (Italian: La Famiglia Passaguai fa fortuna) is a 1952 Italian comedy film directed by Aldo Fabrizi and starring Fabrizi, Erminio Macario, Ave Ninchi and Giovanna Ralli. It is the sequel to the hit 1951 film The Passaguai Family.

It was shot at the Ponti-De Laurentiis Studios in Rome and reunited many of the cast and crew from the previous film. It earned around 192 million lira at the domestic box office.

== Synopsis ==
At the end of the previous film the family patriarch Giuseppe lost his job. Now after a chance meeting with an old comrade he goes into business with him, each pretending to the other that they are a millionaire.

== Cast ==
- Aldo Fabrizi as Giuseppe "Beppe" Passaguai
- Erminio Macario as Giocondo Diotallevi
- Ave Ninchi as Margherita, Giuseppe's wife
- Luigi Pavese as the landlord
- Virgilio Riento as Cosimo Pelacoccie
- Marisa Merlini as the countess
- Giovanna Ralli as Marcella, Giuseppe's daughter
- Carlo Delle Piane as "Pecorino", Giuseppe's son
- Giancarlo Zarfati as "Gnappetta", Giuseppe's son
- Carlo Rizzo as Salomone
- Nino Pavese as The Buyer with a Beard and Glasses
- Alfredo Rizzo as The Journalist Onofrio
- Pietro De Vico as Un autista
- Lia Reiner as Vera
- Tommaso Pallotta as Nando
- Lia Grani as The Maid at Gardini's

== Bibliography ==
- Chiti, Roberto & Poppi, Roberto. Dizionario del cinema italiano: Dal 1945 al 1959. Gremese Editore, 1991.
- Gundle, Stephen. Fame Amid the Ruins: Italian Film Stardom in the Age of Neorealism. Berghahn Books, 2019.
