= We All Loved Each Other So Much =

1974 film by Ettore Scola

- Theatrical release poster
- Italian: C'eravamo tanto amati
- Directed by: Ettore Scola
- Written by: Age & Scarpelli; Ettore Scola
- Produced by: Pio Angeletti; Adriano De Micheli
- Starring: Nino Manfredi; Vittorio Gassman; Stefania Sandrelli; Stefano Satta Flores; Giovanna Ralli; Aldo Fabrizi
- Cinematography: Claudio Cirillo
- Edited by: Raimondo Crociani
- Music by: Armando Trovajoli
- Production company: Deantir
- Distributed by: Delta
- Release date: 21 December 1974
- Running time: 124 minutes
- Country: Italy
- Language: Italian
- Box office: $5.2 million (Italy)

We All Loved Each Other So Much (Italian: C'eravamo tanto amati) is a 1974 Italian comedy-drama film directed by Ettore Scola, who co-wrote the screenplay with screenwriting duo Age & Scarpelli. It stars Nino Manfredi, Vittorio Gassman, Stefania Sandrelli, Stefano Satta Flores, Giovanna Ralli and Aldo Fabrizi. Widely considered one of the best films by Scola, and a notable example of commedia all'italiana, it was dedicated to Italian director Vittorio De Sica. In 2008, the film was included on the Italian Ministry of Cultural Heritage's 100 Italian films to be saved, a list of 100 films that "have changed the collective memory of the country between 1942 and 1978."

== Plot ==
Gianni, Antonio and Nicola are Resistance fighters during World War II. After the war, Antonio becomes a nurse in Rome and falls in love with a girl named Luciana. Gianni becomes an assistant in a law firm, the head of which, La Rosa, is running as a deputy candidate for the Socialist Party. Nicola becomes a high school teacher, gets married, and has a child, Tommasino.

Three years after the war, Antonio, Luciana and Gianni are reminiscing in a restaurant. Unbeknownst to Antonio, Luciana and Gianni fall in love with each other. When they later admit their affair to Antonio, he attacks Gianni. Meanwhile, Nicola loses his job after a violent argument with his superior about the film Bicycle Thieves. Leaving his wife and son, Nicola moves to Rome.

Later, Gianni and Luciana live happily together. Gianni becomes a lawyer and is asked to defend a corrupt real estate constructor, which he refuses, lying about the refusal being due to La Rosa's political and financial misconducts. Elide, the client's daughter, falls in love with Gianni. Gianni is implied to accept a bribe from the client. Meanwhile, Nicola tries to work as a film critic and start a film magazine, but fails.

Years later, Antonio, Nicola and Luciana get drunk together and Antonio argues with Luciana, who believes she can become an actress. Some time later, Gianni receives a letter saying that she has tried to commit suicide. He finds her at a hotel and, when she asks him if Antonio knows about "them", Nicola slaps her. She apologizes to Antonio, who starts a fight with Nicola. When Luciana recovers, they all leave the hotel and go their separate ways. Gianni secretly watches this, unable to find the courage to approach them.

Years pass, Gianni has married Elide and is now a rich lawyer with two children. One night, they see Nicola on a television quiz show about Italian cinema. He answers all the questions right and wins over 1,000,000 lire and the right to return the following week for more. He calls his wife, with whom he is reconciled. At the next show, Nicola bets his winnings double or nothing. When asked a question about Bicycle Thieves, he mistakingly gives a long-winded answer about an actor instead of the actor's character, losing all his winnings.

In 1959, Antonio is at the Trevi Fountain during the shooting of La Dolce Vita. There, he sees an actress, Luciana, who has become an alcoholic. Antonio tries to ask Luciana out when her impresario shows up and says that she will be busy. Antonio starts a fight and she asks not to see him again.

A decade later, Gianni has a mansion in the countryside and avoids Elide. After quarreling with his father-in-law over a real estate project, his father-in-law relinquishes his power over the business to Gianni. Elide confesses to have met another man, but he thinks she is lying to upset him. Distraught, she commits suicide.

Antonio has a new wife. The couple meet Luciana, who works as an usher and lives alone with her young son. Meanwhile, at a festival, Vittorio De Sica tells an anecdote proving that Nicola's answer on the quiz show was correct. Later, Antonio is driving to Rome when he sees Gianni, who pretends to be broke. They agree to meet with Nicola, who is now a stringer for a newspaper. They meet in the usual restaurant and Gianni declares that they are a generation who did nothing to fulfill the hopes they had for a better world. They blame each other's political views and drunkenly fight again. When they stop, Nicola breaks into tears of joy, revealing that Tommasino is getting married.

They all visit Antonio's wife, Luciana, and Gianni tells her that he has always remained in love with her, but Luciana responds that she has not thought of him at all. After Gianni leaves, Nicola finds he mistakenly left his driver's license. The next morning, they visit Gianni to return it and realize that he lied about being broke. They leave the license at the door and start arguing again.

== Cast ==
- Nino Manfredi as Antonio
- Vittorio Gassman as Gianni Perego
- Stefania Sandrelli as Luciana Zanon
- Stefano Satta Flores as Nicola Palumbo
- Giovanna Ralli as Elide Catenacci, Romolo's daughter
- Aldo Fabrizi as Romolo Catenacci
- Mike Bongiorno as himself
- Federico Fellini as himself
- Marcello Mastroianni as himself
- Nello Meniconi as himself
- Guidarino Guidi as himself
- Vittorio De Sica as himself (archive footage)
- Alfonso Crudele as Edoardo
- Isa Barzizza as Elena
- Marcella Michelangeli as Gabriella, Nicola's wife
- Elena Fabrizi as Romolo Catenacci's wife
- Ugo Gregoretti as presenter (uncredited)

== Reception ==
=== Box office ===
After four months of release it had grossed $5.2 million in Italy, the highest-grossing Italian film for the period September 1974 to April 1975.

=== Accolades ===
The film won a César Award for Best Foreign Film in 1977. It also won two Silver Ribbons (Italian cinema critics award, for Fabrizi and Ralli) and the Golden Prize in the 9th Moscow International Film Festival in 1975.
