= Un mandarino per Teo =

1960 film

- Film poster
- Directed by: Mario Mattoli
- Written by: Pietro Garinei; Sandro Giovannini
- Starring: Walter Chiari; Sandra Mondaini; Ave Ninchi
- Cinematography: Gianni Di Venanzo
- Edited by: Roberto Cinquini
- Music by: Gorni Kramer
- Distributed by: Variety Distribution
- Release date: 1960
- Running time: 94 minutes
- Country: Italy
- Language: Italian

Un Mandarino per Teo (Italian for 'A Mandarin for Teo') is a 1960 Italian comedy film directed by Mario Mattoli and starring Walter Chiari.

== Cast ==
- Walter Chiari - Teo Tosci
- Sandra Mondaini - Rosanella Ferrante
- Ave Ninchi - Zia Gaspara
- Riccardo Billi - Ignazio Fumoni
- Carlo Delle Piane - Lo stagnaro
- Annie Gorassini - Angelo biondo
- Chim Kem - Il cinese
- Dante Bisio - Regista Fracassoni
- Anne Marie Delos - Nina Chevrolet
- Corrado Olmi - Il signore in bianco
- Salvo Libassi - Aiuto regista
- Enrico Salvatore - Aiuto regista (as Salvatore Enrico)
- Alberto Bonucci - Il notaio
