= Ave Ninchi =

Italian actress (1914–1997)

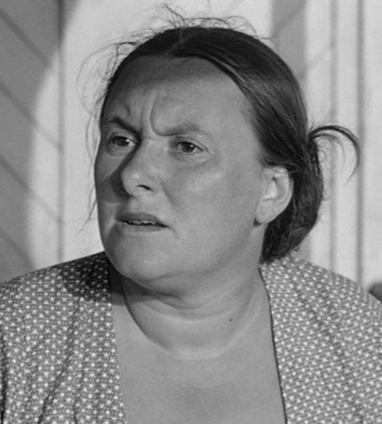
- Ninchi in the movie Sunday in August (1950)
- Born: Ave Maria Ninchi; 14 December 1914; Ancona, Kingdom of Italy
- Died: 10 November 1997 (aged 82); Trieste, Italy
- Occupation: Actress

Ave Maria Ninchi (Italian pronunciation: [ˈaːve maˈriːa ˈniŋki]; 14 December 1914 – 10 November 1997) was an Italian supporting actress who played character roles on stage, television, and in over 98 feature films that included Tomorrow Is Too Late (1949) and Louis Malle's Murmur of the Heart (1971) and Lacombe, Lucien (1974).

Born in Ancona, Italy, Ninchi worked with some of Italy's top movie stars, including Sophia Loren, Anna Magnani, Marcello Mastroianni, Alberto Sordi, and Gina Lollobrigida; her performances playing in duo with Aldo Fabrizi and Totò are considered particularly memorable. Her television career was at its peak during the 1960s and 1970s when she was appearing in some of Italy's top-rated series.

== Selected filmography ==
- Circo equestre Za-bum (1944) – (segment "Galop finale al circo")
- Un giorno nella vita (1946) – Sister Celeste
- Un uomo ritorna (1946) – a friend of Adele's
- Canto, ma sottovoce... (1946) – Laura, the waitress
- Before Him All Rome Trembled (1946) – Nina
- Rome, Free City (1946) – the landlady
- To Live in Peace (1947) – Corinna
- Flesh Will Surrender (1947) – Emilia Canale
- L'onorevole Angelina (1947) – Carmela
- The Captain's Daughter (1947) – Mrs. Mironova, Mascia's mother
- Christmas at Camp 119 (1947) – Mrs. Mancini
- Heart (1948) – Mrs. Serra, Clotilde's mother
- Difficult Years (1948) – Rosina Piscitello
- Immigrants (1948) – Adele Bordoni
- The Firemen of Viggiù (1949) – Gaetana
- Addio Mimì! (1949) – opera singer in La Bohème
- The Walls of Malapaga (1949) – Maria, the neighbour
- The Bride Can't Wait (1949) – Evilina
- Yvonne of the Night (1949) – Rudegarda, the restaurant's owner
- I peggiori anni della nostra vita (1949)
- Little Lady (1949) – Iris
- Sunday in August (1950) – Fernanda
- Toto Looks for a Wife (1950) – the aunt
- Cavalcade of Heroes (1950) – Aurelia
- Pact with the Devil (1950) – Mrs. Mola, Giacomo's wife
- Il vedovo allegro (1950) – Dolores
- The Beggar's Daughter (1950) – Marisa, Anna's housekeeper
- Tomorrow Is Too Late (1950) – Mrs. Berardi
- Sambo (1950) – Amelia Cicerchia
- The Devil in the Convent (1950) – Caterina
- Teresa (1951) – Teresa's mother
- Duello senza onore (1951) – the housekeeper
- Paris Is Always Paris (1951) – Elvira de Angelis
- The Seven Dwarfs to the Rescue (1951) – the nanny
- Messalina (1951) – Locusta / Locuste
- The Passaguai Family (1951) – Margherita, Giuseppe's wife
- Cops and Robbers (1951) – Giovanna Bottoni
- Three Girls from Rome (1952) – Giulia, Marisa's mother
- Amori e veleni (1952)
- The Passaguai Family Gets Rich (1952) – Margherita, Giuseppe's wife
- Stranger on the Prowl (1952)
- Beauties in Capri (1952) – Cornelia
- Papà diventa mamma (1952) – Margherita, Giuseppe's wife
- Mademoiselle Gobete (1952) – Aglae Tricoin
- Toto and the Women (1952) – Giovanna Scaparro
- We're Dancing on the Rainbow (1952) – Donna Rosa
- Serenata amara (1952) – Mario's mother
- La colpa di una madre (1952) – Rosa
- The Piano Tuner Has Arrived (1952) – Mrs. Narducci
- Good Folk's Sunday (1953) – Elvira
- I Chose Love (1953) – Giovanna
- Gioventù alla sbarra (1953) – the judge's sister
- Martin Toccaferro (1953) – Mrs. Molinari
- Condannatelo! (1953)
- Canto per te (1953) – aunt Bettina
- Marriage (1954) – Anastasia Scingalova, the bride's mother
- Storm (1954) – Cecilia
- The Air of Paris (1954)
- Toto Seeks Peace (1954) – Gemma Torresi Piselli
- Madonna delle rose (1954)
- La grande avventura (1954)
- Eighteen Year Olds (1955) – Miss Mattei
- The Bigamist (1956) – Mrs. Masetti
- I pinguini ci guardano (1956)
- Love (1956) – Beatrice
- Una pelliccia di visone (1957) – Assunta Santini
- I prepotenti (1958) – Clelia Pinelli
- Serenatella sciuè sciuè (1958) – Agrippina Scuoffolo
- Le donne ci tengono assai (1959) – Angelica Allegri
- Venetian Honeymoon (1959) – Yolanda
- Prepotenti più di prima (1959) – Clelia Pinelli
- The Nun's Story (1959) – Sister Bernard (uncredited)
- Le notti dei teddy boys (1959) – sis Jole
- Purple Noon (1960) – Mrs. Gianna
- Les Bonnes Femmes (1960) – Mrs. Louise
- Un mandarino per Teo (1960) – aunt Gaspara
- Vita col padre e con la madre (1960, TV mini-series) – Bessie Logan
- Madri pericolose (1960) – Mattea Tornabuoni
- I teddy boys della canzone (1960) – Donna Celestina
- Le ambiziose (1961) – Ines
- Maciste contro Ercole nella valle dei guai (1961)
- Scandali al mare (1961) – Olga Cappelli
- Le magnifiche 7 (1961) – Margherita
- Walter e i suoi cugini (1961) – Adele
- Gli italiani e le donne (1962) – Cesare Mancini's wife (segment "Chi la fa l'aspetti")
- L'assassino si chiama Pompeo (1962) – Adelina, the doorkeeper
- Il mulino del Po (1963, TV mini-series) – Donata
- Le motorizzate (1963) – Sister Teresa (segment "Carmelitane sprint")
- Cleopazza (1964) – Gabriella's mother
- In ginocchio da te (1964) – Cesira, the cook
- Le tardone (1964) – Adelina Borletti (episode "Un delitto quasi perfetto")
- Ragazzi dell'hully-gully (1964)
- Biblioteca di Studio Uno (1964, TV mini-series) – the Countess of Tournay
- Las otoñales (1964)
- Non son degno di te (1965) – Cesira
- Gli altri e noi (1965)
- House of Cards (1968) – Mrs. Orragi
- Il sole è di tutti (1968)
- I due magnifici fresconi (1969) – Adelina Borletti (uncredited)
- Sapho ou La fureur d'aimer (1971) – the housekeeper
- Le souffle au cœur (1971) – Augusta
- Il furto è l'anima del commercio (1971) – Annunziata Caccavallo
- I due assi del guantone (1971) – Adele
- Pulp (1972) – the fat chambermaid
- Lacombe, Lucien (1974) – Mrs. Georges
- Nel mondo di Alice (1974, TV mini-series) – the Queen of Hearts
- La donna serpente (1976, TV movie) – Smeraldina / Farzana
