= Pensiero d'amore =

- Directed by: Mario Amendola
- Written by: Bruno Corbucci; Mario Amendola
- Starring: Mal
- Cinematography: Fausto Rossi
- Music by: Mario Migliardi English dub track Stateside Records
- Distributed by: Euro International Film
- Release date: 1969
- Country: Italy
- Language: Italian

Pensiero d'amore (Italian for Thought of love) is a 1969 Italian "musicarello" film directed by Mario Amendola and starring Mal and Silvia Dionisio.

== Cast ==
- Mal as Reg
- Silvia Dionisio as Paola
- Stelvio Rosi as Kurt
- Angela Luce as Stefania Varaldi
- Francesco Mulè as Sor Domenico
- Carlo Delle Piane as Ovidio
- Gina Mascetti as Miss Tibiletti
- Pietro De Vico as Enrico
- Beatrice Bensi as Gilda aka Paperona
- Umberto D'Orsi as Giovanni Tibiletti
- Pippo Franco as Leone
- Franco Allocca as Gianluca
- Fulvio Mingozzi as Renzetti
- Gianni Pulone as TV Director
- Luca Sportelli as Attore Toscano
