= Eighteen Year Olds =

1955 film

- Film poster
- Directed by: Mario Mattoli
- Written by: Aldo De Benedetti; Ennio De Concini; Mario Mattoli; Carlo Musso
- Produced by: Dino De Laurentiis; Basilio Franchina; Carlo Ponti
- Starring: Marisa Allasio; Virna Lisi
- Cinematography: Marco Scarpelli
- Edited by: Roberto Cinquini
- Music by: Armando Trovajoli
- Release date: 1955
- Running time: 90 minutes
- Country: Italy
- Language: Italian

Eighteen Year Olds (Italian: Le diciottenni) is a 1955 Italian comedy film directed by Mario Mattoli and starring Marisa Allasio.

== Cast ==
- Marisa Allasio as Anna Campolmi
- Virna Lisi as Maria Rovani
- Anthony Steffen as the physics teacher (as Antonio De Teffè)
- Margherita Bagni as the headmistress
- Ave Ninchi as miss Mattei
- Adriana Benetti as the music teacher
- Luisella Boni as Luisa
- Pietro De Vico as Campanelli
- Enzo Garinei as Stalliere
- Ivo Garrani as Il medico
- Rina Morelli as madre di Maria
- Ave Ninchi as Signorina Mattei
- Luigi Pavese as professore di greco
- Nora Ricci as assistante del collegio
- Virgilio Riento as il portiere del collegio
