= Immigrants (1948 film) =

1948 film

- Film poster
- Directed by: Aldo Fabrizi
- Written by: Piero Ballerini; Aldo Fabrizi; Fulvio Palmieri
- Starring: Aldo Fabrizi; Ave Ninchi; Nando Bruno; Loredana
- Cinematography: Piero Portalupi
- Edited by: Rosalino Caterbetti; Jorge Levillotti
- Music by: Alexandre Derevitsky; Sacha Derewitsky
- Production company: Guaranteed Pictures
- Distributed by: Scalera Film
- Release date: 10 November 1948
- Running time: 120 minutes
- Countries: Italy; Argentina
- Language: Italian

Immigrants (Italian: Emigrantes) is a 1948 Argentine-Italian drama film directed by and starring Aldo Fabrizi and also featuring Ave Ninchi, Nando Bruno and Loredana. The film's sets were designed by the art director Abel López Chas. It was produced during the Classical Era of Argentine Cinema.

== Plot ==
At war's end, Giuseppe emigrates to Argentina.

== Cast ==
- Aldo Fabrizi as Giuseppe Bordoni
- Ave Ninchi as Adele Bordoni
- Nando Bruno as Gigi
- Loredana as Maria Bordoni
- Adolfo Celi as Il professore
- Eduardo Passarelli as Gennarino
- Iván Grondona
- Giuseppe Rinaldi
- Michele Malaspina
- Rino Salviati

== Bibliography ==
- Gundle, Stephen. Fame Amid the Ruins: Italian Film Stardom in the Age of Neorealism. Berghahn Books, 2019.
