= Hanno rubato un tram =

- Directed by: Aldo Fabrizi; Mario Bonnard
- Story by: Luciano Vincenzoni
- Starring: Aldo Fabrizi; Carlo Campanini; Lucia Banti; Juan de Landa; Lia Rainer
- Cinematography: Mario Bava
- Edited by: Maria Rosada
- Music by: Carlo Rustichelli
- Production company: Imperial Film
- Distributed by: Columbia-CEIAD
- Release date: December 30, 1954
- Running time: 90 minutes
- Country: Italy

Hanno rubato un tram (lit. 'They Stole a Tram') is a 1954 Italian comedy film starring Aldo Fabrizi. The film was started under the direction of Mario Bonnard who left mid-way through. Reference books state that Fabrizi himself began finishing the film, while Luciano Vincenzoni said that the assistant director Sergio Leone completed the film.

== Plot ==
Tram conductor Cesare Mancini accidentally hits a woman riding on a bicycle, and gets demoted down to a humble ticket taker.

== Cast ==
- Aldo Fabrizi as Cesare Mancini
- Carlo Campanini as Bernasconi
- Juan de Landa as Rossi
- Lucia Banti as Marcella
- Mimo Billi as Caposervizio
- Fernanda Giordani as Suocera
- Lia Rainer as Teresa
- Bruno Corelli as Pretore
- Sergio Leone
- Zoe Incrocci

== Production ==
Hanno rubato un tram was filmed at Cinecittà and on location in Bologna, Italy. The film went into production with Mario Bonnard as the director, who was then replaced with Aldo Fabrizi. The films story author, Luciano Vincenzoni, recalled in 1984 that "Bonnard was already old and ill, I think half of the film must have been put together by [Sergio] Leone."

Sources vary on the screenwriters of the film. Il Cinema Ritrovato includes Bonnard, Ruggero Maccari, and Fabrizi while ANICA adds Lucio Fulci and Alessandro Continenza. There is no mention of Fulci contributing to the film in Stephen Thrower's book Beyond Terror: The Films of Lucio Fulci (2018).

In his book Sergio Leone: Something to Do With Death, author Christopher Frayling wrote that references books state that Aldo Fabrizi had completed Hanno rubato un tram. Fabrizi himself said at the time that his assistant director Leone "wasn't even thinking about becoming a director" at this time.

== Release ==
Hanno rubato un tram was released December 30, 1954.

== See also ==
- List of Italian films of 1954
