= Pietro De Vico =

Italian actor

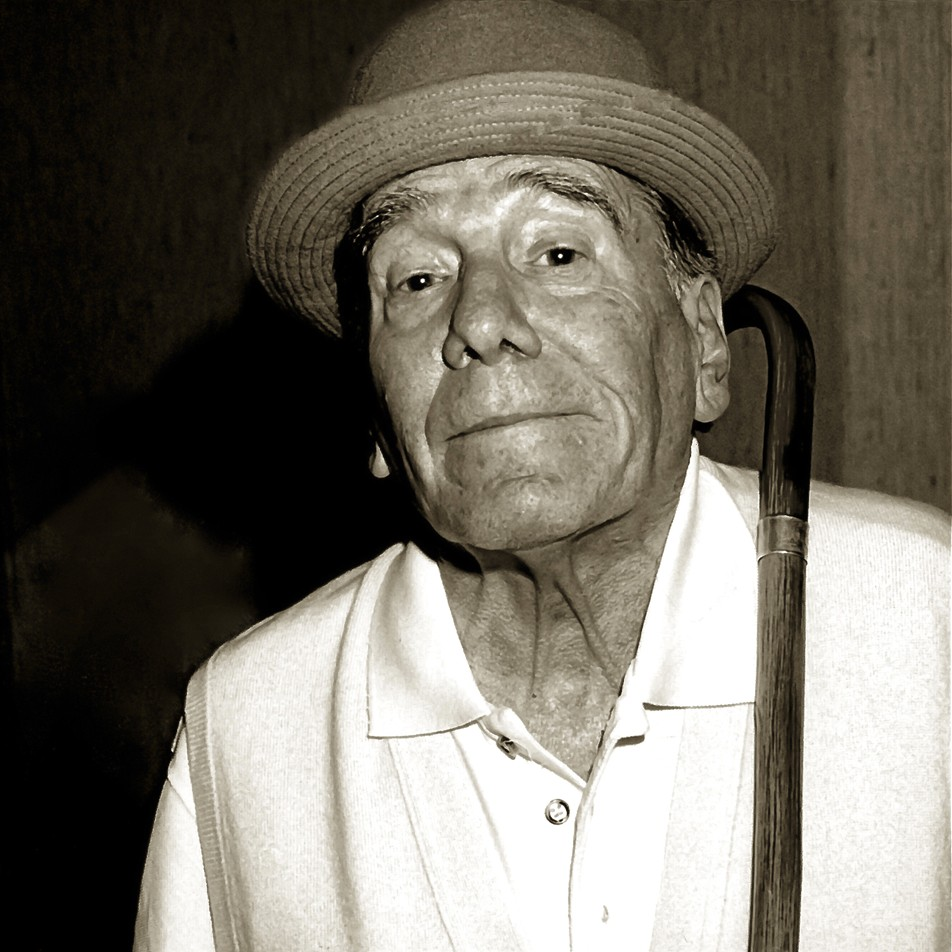
- Pietro De Vico: portrait - Augusto De Luca
- Born: 1 February 1911; Naples, Kingdom of Italy
- Died: 10 December 1999 (aged 88); Rome, Italy
- Occupation: Actor
- Years active: 1948–1991
- Spouse: Anna Campori

Pietro De Vico (1 February 1911 – 10 December 1999) was an Italian film actor. He appeared in 70 films between 1948 and 1991.

== Selected filmography ==
- Christmas at Camp 119 (1947) - (uncredited)
- Toto Looks for a House (1949) - Cinese
- Toto the Sheik (1950) - L'arabo della stanza bianca
- Rome-Paris-Rome (1951) - Sposino
- The Passaguai Family (1951) - Il ragazzo di Marcella
- The Passaguai Family Gets Rich (1952) - Un autista
- Il viale della speranza (1953) - Tonio
- La valigia dei sogni (1953) - Il regista del provino
- Ore 10: lezione di canto (1955) - Pietro - uno dei Five Jolly
- Eighteen Year Olds (1955) - Campanelli
- Una voce, una chitarra, un po' di luna (1956) - Franz
- Sette canzoni per sette sorelle (1957) - Romeo
- Serenata a Maria (1957) - Pasqualino, the painter
- A sud niente di nuovo (1957)
- Il Conte di Matera (1958) - Golia
- Quando gli angeli piangono (1958)
- Il Medico Dei Pazzi (1959)
- Arriva la banda (1959)
- Fantasmi e ladri (1959) - Pietruccio
- La duchessa di Santa Lucia (1959) - Tommasino
- Ferdinando I, re di Napoli (1959) - The Foreteller of Lottery Results
- Sogno di una notte di mezza sbornia (1959) - Arturo
- The Employee (1960) - McNally
- Caccia al marito (1960) - Oscar Fantacci - the ice-cream seller
- The Two Rivals (1960) - Merigo
- Appuntamento a Ischia (1960) - Rotunno's Pianist
- Mariti in pericolo (1960) - Parrucchiere
- Who Hesitates Is Lost (1960) - Il cameriere
- Caravan petrol (1960) - Alfonsino
- La moglie di mio marito (1961) - Il posteggiatore
- Sua Eccellenza si fermò a mangiare (1961) - Pierino
- Come September (1961) - Poliziotto (uncredited)
- 5 marines per 100 ragazze (1961) - Attendente del generale
- Totòtruffa 62 (1961) - Contatore di piccioni
- The Last Judgment (1961)
- Accroche-toi, y'a du vent! (1961) - Un brigadiere
- Le magnifiche 7 (1961) - Calogero
- Pesci d'oro e bikini d'argento (1961)
- Rocco e le sorelle (1961)
- Mariti a congresso (1961)
- Che femmina!! E... che dollari! (1961)
- Totò Diabolicus (1962) - Il Paziente
- Nerone '71 (1962) - Assistente della regista
- Gladiator of Rome (1962) - Pompilio
- Lo sceicco rosso (1962) - Ignacio
- Twist, lolite e vitelloni (1962)
- I soliti rapinatori a Milano (1963)
- The Swindlers (1963) - Chancellor (segment "Pretura, La")
- I marziani hanno 12 mani (1964) - Cameriere d'Hotel
- The Masked Man Against the Pirates (1964)
- What Ever Happened to Baby Toto? (1964)
- Sedotti e bidonati (1964) - Master builder
- Napoleone a Firenze (1964)
- Cadavere a spasso (1965) - Nicolino
- Soldati e caporali (1965) - Nicola Cacace
- Mi vedrai tornare (1966) - Cameriere delle Aleardi
- Giorno caldo al Paradiso Show (1966)
- Don't Sting the Mosquito (1967)
- Una ragazza tutta d'oro (1967) - The Thief
- Soldati e capelloni (1967)
- La vuole lui... lo vuole lei (1968)
- Pensiero d'amore (1969) - Enrico
- Lisa dagli occhi blu (1970) - Policeman
- Lady Barbara (1970) - Bagnasco
- The Swinging Confessors (1970)
- Brancaleone at the Crusades (1970) - Un giudice della strega
- Man of the Year (1971) - Guida turistica (uncredited)
- Sgarro alla camorra (1973) - 'Gnasso'
- The Payoff (1978) - Guardiano posteggio auto
- Figlio mio, sono innocente! (1978) - Pilade Schiattato
- The Mass Is Ended (1985) - Frate / Friar
- Scandalo segreto (1990)
- Ladri di futuro (1991)

== Personal life ==
De Vico was married, from 1937 until his death in 1999, to actress Anna Campori.
