= Welcome, Reverend! =

Benvenuto, reverendo!
- Directed by: Aldo Fabrizi
- Written by: Aldo Fabrizi, Piero Tellini (screenplay)
- Produced by: Aldo Fabrizi
- Starring: Aldo Fabrizi
- Cinematography: Aldo Giordani
- Music by: Carlo Innocenzi
- Distributed by: Alfa Films XXXVII, Ente Nazionale Industrie Cinematografiche (ENIC)
- Release date: February 15, 1950
- Running time: 90 minutes
- Country: Italy
- Language: Italian

Welcome Reverend (Italian: Benvenuto, reverendo!) is a 1950 Italian crime film comedy directed, written by and starring Aldo Fabrizi. It co-stars Massimo Girotti and Lianella Carell.

== Cast ==
- Aldo Fabrizi as Don Peppino
- Lianella Carell as Anna
- Massimo Girotti
- Gabriele Ferzetti
- Giovanni Grasso
- Mario Mazza
- Virginia Balestrieri
- Pitto as The child (as il piccolo Pitto)
- Ada Colangeli
- Franco Fava
- Lia Grani
- Marianne Hold
- Alfredo Leggi
- Amerigo Santarelli
- Carlo Titta
- Raimondo Van Riel
