= For the Love of Mariastella =

1946 film

- Directed by: Pino Mercanti
- Screenplay by: Pino Mercanti; Giuseppe Zucca; Natale Di Cristina
- Story by: Giuseppe Zucca; Ovidio Imara
- Produced by: O.F.S. Palermo
- Starring: Otello Toso
- Cinematography: Giuseppe La Torre
- Edited by: Mario Serandrei
- Release date: December 12, 1946
- Country: Italy
- Language: Italian

For the Love of Mariastella (Italian: Malacarne, also known as Turi della tonnara) is a 1946 Italian melodrama film written and directed by Pino Mercanti. Based on a story of the Sicilian writer Giuseppe Zucca, it was mainly shot in the tonnara of Castellammare del Golfo, with some scenes shot in the tonnaras of Scopello and of San Vito Lo Capo. It is considered as a progenitor of pink neorealism.

== Cast ==
- Otello Toso as Turi della Tonnara, aka 'Malacarne'
- Mariella Lotti as Mariastella
- Amedeo Nazzari as Zù Bastiano
- Umberto Spadaro as Fifi the Hunchback
- Giovanni Grasso jr. as Raìs Pietro
- Natale Cirino as the Trapanese
- Anna Silena as Maruzza
- Carlo Sposito as Rosalino
- Rosetta Romano as Donna Agatina
- Salvatore Chimenti as Don Papò
