= Suggestionata =

- Directed by: Alfredo Rizzo
- Written by: Mario De Rosa; Alfredo Rizzo
- Starring: Gabriele Ferzetti; Eleonora Giorgi; Gioia Scola
- Music by: Carlo Savina
- Release date: 1978
- Country: Italy
- Language: Italian

Suggestionata is a 1978 Italian drama film directed by Alfredo Rizzo and starring Eleonora Giorgi and Gabriele Ferzetti.

== Plot ==
An engineer, a wealthy professional, and a former fascist, returns to Italy to reclaim his land. Widowed with three young children, he forms a voluntary bond with a young and alluring woman. Influenced by the political and social discussions of her father, which she had heard when she was just thirteen, she orchestrates a situation in which she isolates herself with her lover's children and leads them into the moral abyss in which she finds herself. The protagonist will thus find himself facing a series of crimes, without even understanding whether they are motivated by political revenge or material gain.

== Cast ==
- Gabriele Ferzetti as Gregorio
- Eleonora Giorgi as Anna
- Gioia Scola as Rachele
- Giampiero Albertini as Francesco
- Piero Gerlini as The Inspector
