= Un uomo ritorna =

- Directed by: Max Neufeld
- Written by: Anton Giulio Majano, Ivo Ferilli and Umberto Del Giglio
- Music by: Carlo Innocenzi
- Release date: 1946
- Running time: 81 minutes
- Country: Italy
- Language: Italian

Un uomo ritorna (also known as Revenge) is a 1946 Italian drama film directed by Max Neufeld.

It was shown as part of a retrospective "Questi fantasmi: Cinema italiano ritrovato" at the 65th Venice International Film Festival.

== Plot ==
The film is set in April 1945. The engineer Sergio returns home to a town in Lazio after five years as a prisoner of war. He finds his homeland ravaged. The minefields and hydroelectric power plant were the main sources of employment and they are both destroyed. His old mother and a brother are still there but his wife Adele is working in Rome. Their son has been taken in a fascist raid. When Adele learns the son has died she goes after revenge armed with a gun.

== Cast ==
- Gino Cervi: Sergio
- Anna Magnani: Adele
- Luisa Poselli: Luciana
- Felice Romano: Carlo
- Ave Ninchi
- Aldo Silvani
- Olinto Cristina

== Critical reception ==
The film was censored and then rediscovered in 2008. A man called Giancarlo Mancini found a bad Italian copy interspersed with fragments from a French edition in Ripley's Home Video. It has been described as a mediocre melodrama with obvious implausibilities in the plot and unsuited to Neufeld.

Professional ratings
Review scores
Source	Rating
Mymovies.it	3/5 stars
