= The Passaguai Family =

1951 film

- Spanish poster
- Directed by: Aldo Fabrizi
- Written by: Anton Germano Rossi; Aldo Fabrizi; Mario Amendola; Ruggero Maccari
- Produced by: Aldo Fabrizi
- Starring: Aldo Fabrizi; Peppino De Filippo; Ave Ninchi
- Cinematography: Mario Bava
- Edited by: Mario Bonotti
- Music by: Carlo Innocenzi; Enrico Simeone
- Production company: Alfa Film
- Distributed by: Variety Distribution
- Release date: 20 December 1951
- Running time: 95 minutes
- Country: Italy
- Language: Italian

The Passaguai Family (Italian: La Famiglia Passaguai) is a 1951 Italian comedy film written, starring and directed by Aldo Fabrizi. It also featured Peppino De Filippo, Ave Ninchi and Giovanna Ralli. It was followed by a sequel The Passaguai Family Gets Rich in 1952. It follows the misadventures of a lower middle-class family and their friends from Rome when they take a day's outing at the seaside.

It was shot at the Ponti-De Laurentiis Studios in Rome and on location around the city and at the resort of Fiumicino at the mouth of the River Tiber near Ostia. Distributed by the Italian branch of the Rank Organisation it was a major hit, taking domestic box office earnings of 378 million lira.

In 2008, the film was included on the Italian Ministry of Cultural Heritage’s 100 Italian films to be saved, a list of 100 films that "have changed the collective memory of the country between 1942 and 1978."

== Cast ==
- Aldo Fabrizi as Cav. Peppe Passaguai
- Ave Ninchi as Margherita, moglie di Peppe
- Peppino De Filippo as Rag. Mazza, collega di Peppe
- Tino Scotti as Comm. Villetti, capufficio di Peppe
- Nyta Dover as Marisa, segretaria
- Giovanna Ralli as Marcella, figlia maggiore dei Passaguai
- Carlo Delle Piane as Gino (detto Pecorino), secondo figlio dei Passaguai
- Giancarlo Zarfati as Gnappetta, figlio minore dei Passaguai
- Luigi Pavese as Alberto
- Jole Silvani as Jole
- Pietro De Vico as l'innamorato di Marcella
- Alberto Sorrentino

== Bibliography ==
- Chiti, Roberto & Poppi, Roberto. Dizionario del cinema italiano: Dal 1945 al 1959. Gremese Editore, 1991.
- Gundle, Stephen. Fame Amid the Ruins: Italian Film Stardom in the Age of Neorealism. Berghahn Books, 2019.
