= The Bride Can't Wait =

- Directed by: Gianni Franciolini
- Written by: Cesare Zavattini; Antonio Pietrangeli; Piero Tellini
- Produced by: Baccio Bandini
- Starring: Gino Cervi; Gina Lollobrigida; Odile Versois
- Cinematography: Carlo Montuori
- Edited by: Eraldo da Roma
- Music by: Roman Vlad
- Production company: Lux Film
- Distributed by: Lux Film
- Release date: 27 October 1949
- Running time: 95 minutes
- Country: Italy
- Language: Italian

The Bride Can't Wait (Italian: La sposa non può attendere) is a 1949 Italian comedy film directed by Gianni Franciolini and starring Gino Cervi, Gina Lollobrigida and Odile Versois.

It was shot at the Farnesina Studios in Rome. The film earned around 15 million lira at the box office.

== Cast ==
- Gino Cervi as Anselmo Brunelli
- Gina Lollobrigida as Donata Venturi
- Odile Versois as Maria
- Giacomo Furia as Giovanni
- Leopoldo Valentini as Capostazione
- Ave Ninchi as Miss Evelina
- Nando Bruno as Mr. Venturi
- Ada Colangeli as Sister Celeste
- Adriano Ambrogi as Doctor
- Cosetta Greco as Young Nun
