= Alfredo Rizzo =

Italian actor, screenwriter and director (1902–1991)

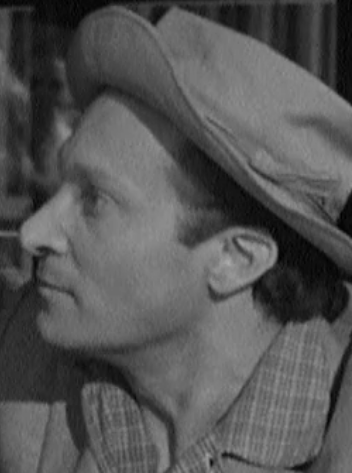
- Rizzo in Una bruna indiavolata! (1951)
- Born: 2 January 1902; Nice, France
- Died: 6 September 1991 (aged 89); Rome, Italy

Alfredo Rizzo (2 January 1902 – 6 September 1991) was an Italian actor, screenwriter and director.

== Life and career ==
Born in Nice, France into a family of actors, Rizzo started his career as an actor of avanspettacolo and revue, often alongside his brother Carlo. After his debut on the big screen in 1939, in the aftermath of the Second World War he had an intense and long film career, being mostly cast in the role of "villain". Later, he also wrote and directed a number of films, mostly of erotic genre, sometimes credited as Fred Ritz.

== Selected filmography ==
Actor

- Lo vedi come sei... lo vedi come sei? (1939) - L'uomo della mosca di piatto (uncredited)
- Macario Against Zagomar (1944)
- L'Amante del male (1946) - Il giudice Forlenza
- Lost in the Dark (1947)
- Fire Over the Sea (1947) - Barbiere in Argentina
- Sono io l'assassino (1948)
- I contrabbandieri del mare (1948)
- The Firemen of Viggiù (1949) - Fireman from Milan
- Vivere a sbafo (1949)
- How I Discovered America (1949) - Nazista
- I cadetti di Guascogna (1950)
- La paura fa 90 (1951) - Il suggeritore
- Quo Vadis (1951) - Hairdresser (uncredited)
- Una bruna indiavolata! (1951) - Finto Testimone
- Auguri e figli maschi! (1951) - Clerk at Vinicio Paciottini's Office (uncredited)
- Papà diventa mamma (1952)
- In Olden Days (1952) - (segment "Il processo di Frine") (uncredited)
- Heroic Charge (1952) - The Colonel
- Il romanzo della mia vita (1952) - The Thief with a Hat
- Io, Amleto (1952) - Cliente sordo nella taverna
- The Piano Tuner Has Arrived (1952)
- The Passaguai Family Gets Rich (1952)
- Siamo tutti inquilini (1953) - Inquilino (uncredited)
- Roman Holiday (1953) - Taxicab Driver
- Anni facili (1953)
- Bread, Love and Dreams (1953) - Brigadiere Squinzi
- Crossed Swords (1954)
- I cavalieri della regina (1954)
- Milanese in Naples (1954) - Alfredo
- Assi alla ribalta (1954)
- War and Peace (1956) - Soldier (uncredited)
- Interpol (1957) - Abbata (uncredited)
- Sorrisi e canzoni (1958)
- Terror of Oklahoma (1959) - Sheriff
- I baccanali di Tiberio (1960)
- La Dolce Vita (1960) - Television Director (uncredited)
- The Playgirls and the Vampire (1960) - Lucas, the manager
- Caravan petrol (1960)
- A Qualcuna Piace Calvo (1960) - Agente
- Boccaccio '70 (1962) - Foreman (uncredited)
- Il segno del vendicatore (1962) - Frate Giovanni
- Roaring Years (1962)
- Il criminale (1962) - Signore pignolo
- Duel at the Rio Grande (1963) - Sirviente
- Vino, whisky e acqua salata (1963)
- Giacobbe, l'uomo che lottò con Dio (1963)
- Una sporca faccenda (1964)
- La strage dei vampiri (1964)
- Two Mafiamen in the Far West (1964) - Colonel Peabody
- Le sette vipere (Il marito latino) (1964) - Italian Judge
- Two Escape from Sing Sing (1964) - Sauna Director (uncredited)
- Seven Slaves Against the World (1964) - Efrem
- La traite des blanches (1965)
- Terror-Creatures from the Grave (1965) - Dr. Nemek
- Blood for a Silver Dollar (1965) - Buddy
- Colorado Charlie (1965) - Sam, Drunk
- Per una manciata d'oro (1965) - Medico
- La vedovella (1965) - Carlo Sardelli
- Bloody Pit of Horror (1965) - Daniel Parks
- Go with God, Gringo (1966) - Ayudante del inspector
- I due sanculotti (1966) - 'Linguaveloce' (uncredited)
- 7 monaci d'oro (1966)
- Born to Kill (1967) - Crooked gambler
- Non Pensare a Me (Não Pense em Mim) (1967)
- Don't Wait, Django... Shoot! (1967) - Nico
- Cuore matto... matto da legare (1967)
- Brutti di notte (1968) - Dr. Federzotti - the Psychoanalyst
- Vengeance Is My Forgiveness (1968) - Peter, Piano Player
- Spirits of the Dead (1968) - Angry Man in Car (segment "Toby Dammit") (uncredited)
- Don Chisciotte and Sancio Panza (1968) - Governor doctor
- I 2 deputati (1968) - Dott. Lucarini
- Fellini Satyricon (1969) - The Innkeeper
- Agguato sul Bosforo (1969) - Martin
- Three (1969) - Waiter
- Puro siccome un angelo papà mi fece monaco... di Monza (1969)
- Paths of War (1970) - Sergeant Douglas
- Un caso di coscienza (1970) - Club president
- Don Franco e Don Ciccio nell'anno della contestazione (1970) - Veterinario
- Quando suona la campana (1970) - Moreno
- La prima notte del dottor Danieli, industriale, col complesso del... giocattolo (1970) - Federico
- Principe coronato cercasi per ricca ereditiera (1970) - Luigi Fisichella
- Due bianchi nell'Africa nera (1970) - Otto Krauser
- Mazzabubù... quante corna stanno quaggiù? (1971) - The anti-divorce Orator
- I giardini del diavolo (1971) - General
- Venga a fare il soldato da noi (1971) - Pizzuti
- The Price of Death (1971) - Judge Atwell
- Paid in Blood (1971) - Jack Buchanan / Buck
- Holy Water Joe (1971) - Captain
- The Beasts (1971) - Dott. Apposito (segment "Il caso Apposito")
- God Is My Colt .45 (1972) - Ted Curtis (uncredited)
- Confessioni segrete di un convento di clausura (1972) - Prior
- Sistemo l'America e torno (1974) - Alex Biondi
- SS Hell Camp (1977) - Allied Officer (uncredited)
- La bestia in calore (1977) - Moreno (uncredited)
- Amore all'arrabbiata (1977) - Ingegner Giovanni
- Little Italy (1978) - Old Bald Man (uncredited)
- Uno contro l'altro, praticamente amici (1981) - Avv. Randolfi
- Crime at the Chinese Restaurant (1981) - Papetti's lover's husband
- Il diavolo e l'acquasanta (1983) - Sindaco

Director and screenwriter

- Heroes without glory (1971)
- The Bloodsucker Leads the Dance (1975)
- La bolognese (1975)
- Suggestionata (1978)
