= One of Those =

1953 film by Aldo Fabrizi

- Directed by: Aldo Fabrizi
- Written by: Giorgio Bianchi; Aldo De Benedetti; Aldo Fabrizi
- Starring: Lea Padovani; Peppino De Filippo; Totò; Aldo Fabrizi
- Cinematography: Gábor Pogány
- Music by: Carlo Innocenzi
- Release date: 1953
- Running time: 86 min
- Country: Italy
- Language: Italian

One of Those (Italian: Una di quelle, also known as Totò, Peppino e... una di quelle) is a 1953 Italian comedy-drama film produced, written, directed and starred by Aldo Fabrizi.

== Plot ==
Maria is a widow with a dependent child, in debt with her landlord, and she tries to get by on small tailoring jobs. One day she receives a visit from a neighbor, a prostitute. Praising the beauty of Maria, and understanding her economic difficulties, the prostitute suggests her to attempt the same profession, in her view the only way for a single woman to find the money to live.

Desperate by the personal and economic situation, Maria reluctantly accepts the advice and the next day she went to a nightclub, where she encounter two wealthy country men, the brothers Martino and Rocco.

== Cast ==
- Lea Padovani as Maria Rossetti
- Peppino De Filippo as Martino Bardelli
- Totò as Rocco Bardelli
- Aldo Fabrizi as Dr. Ubaldo Mancini
- Mara Landi as L'entraineuse
- Giulio Calì as Guardamacchine
- Nando Bruno as Il tassista
- Mario Castellani as Il farmacista
- Laura Gore as Annie
- Antonio Vaser as Il portiere d'albergo
- Alberto Talegalli as Un burino
- Pina Piovani as La portinaia
