= Mario Bava =

Italian filmmaker (1914–1980)

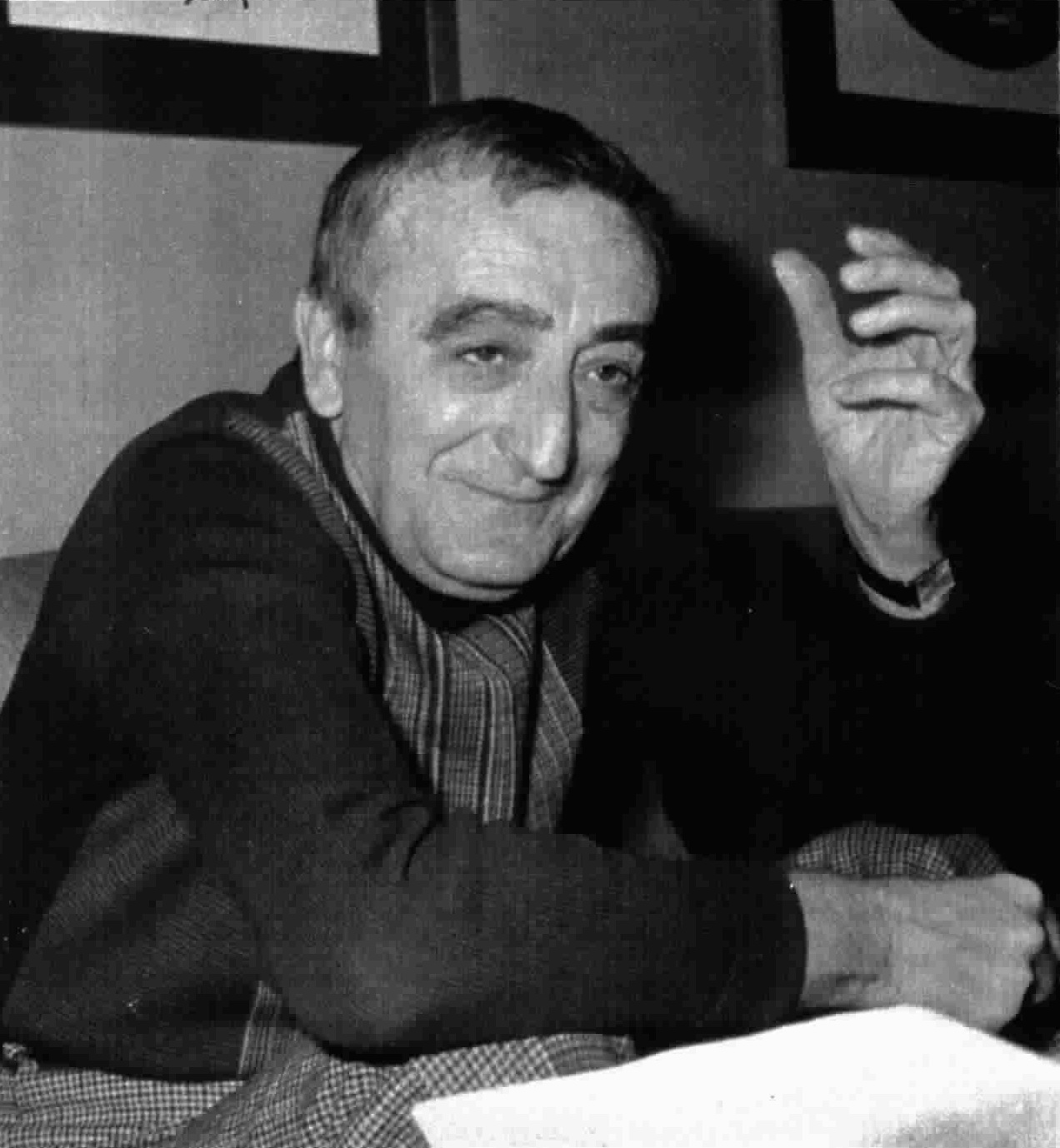
- Bava in 1975
- Born: 30 July 1914; Sanremo, Kingdom of Italy
- Died: 27 April 1980 (aged 65); Rome, Italy
- Other names: John M. Old; John Foam
- Occupations: Film director; cinematographer; special effects artist; screenwriter
- Years active: 1937–1980
- Children: Lamberto Bava
- Father: Eugenio Bava

Mario Bava (Italian: [ˈmaːrjo ˈbaːva]; 30 July 1914 – 27 April 1980) was an Italian filmmaker who worked variously as a director, cinematographer, special effects artist and screenwriter. His low-budget genre films, known for their distinctive visual flair and stylish technical ingenuity, feature recurring themes and imagery concerning the conflict between illusion and reality, as well as the destructive capacity of human nature. Widely regarded as a pioneer of Italian genre cinema and one of the most influential and greatest filmmakers of all time, he is popularly referred to as the "Master of Italian Horror" and the "Master of the Macabre".

After providing special effects work and other assistance on such productions as I Vampiri (1957), Hercules (1958) and Caltiki – The Immortal Monster (1959), Bava made his official feature directorial debut with the gothic horror film Black Sunday, released in 1960. He went on to direct such films as The Girl Who Knew Too Much, Black Sabbath, The Whip and the Body (all released in 1963), Blood and Black Lace (1964), Planet of the Vampires (1965), Kill, Baby, Kill (1966), Danger: Diabolik (1968), A Bay of Blood (1971), Baron Blood (1972), Lisa and the Devil (1974) and Rabid Dogs (1974).

According to the British Film Institute, "Bava took a vital role in the creation of the modern horror film. If there was to be a Mount Rushmore-style monument dedicated to four directors whose work pioneered a new form of big screen chills and thrills, those giant faces etched in granite on the mountainside would be: Bava, Alfred Hitchcock, Georges Franju and Michael Powell."

== Family ==
Born to sculptor, cinematographer and special effects pioneer Eugenio Bava, the younger Mario Bava followed his father into the film industry, and eventually earned a reputation as one of Italy's foremost cameramen, lighting and providing the special effects for such films as Hercules (1958) and its sequel Hercules Unchained (1959) (both were lampooned on Mystery Science Theater 3000).

Mario Bava's son and frequent assistant director, Lamberto Bava, later became a noted fantasy and horror film director in his own right.

== Biography ==
Mario Bava was born in Sanremo, Liguria, on 31 July 1914. He was the son of Eugenio Bava (1886–1966), a sculptor who also worked as a special-effects photographer and cameraman in the Italian silent-film industry. Mario Bava's first ambition was to become a painter. Unable to turn out paintings at a profitable rate, he went into his father's business, working as an assistant to other Italian cinematographers like Massimo Terzano. He also helped his father at the special effects department at Benito Mussolini's film factory, the Istituto Luce.

Bava became a cinematographer himself in 1939, shooting two short films with Roberto Rossellini. He made his feature debut in the early 1940s. Bava's camerawork was an instrumental factor in developing the screen personas of such stars of the period as Gina Lollobrigida, Steve Reeves and Aldo Fabrizi.

During the late 1950s, his eventual career trajectory as a director began when he was relied upon to complete projects begun by or credited to his colleague Riccardo Freda and other filmmakers, including The Day the Sky Exploded (1958) (often cited as the first Italian science fiction film), Caltiki – The Immortal Monster (1959) and The Giant of Marathon (1959).

Bava collaborated in I vampiri (a.k.a. The Devil's Commandment) for director Riccardo Freda in 1956, a movie now referred to as the first Italian horror film. Bava was hired as the cinematographer, even creating the innovative special effects that were needed. He also handled the cinematography and special effects on the 1955 Kirk Douglas epic Ulysses and the 1957 Steve Reeves classic Hercules, two films credited with sparking the Italian sword and sandal genre.

Bava co-directed The Day the Sky Exploded in 1958, the first Italian science fiction film after the 2nd World War, predating even the sci-fi films of Antonio Margheriti. Because he had no earlier credited experience as a director, the film was credited solely to Paolo Heusch.

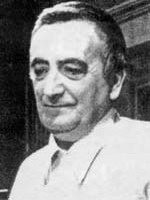
Bava in 1962

In 1960, Bava directed the gothic horror classic Black Sunday, his first solo directorial effort, which made a genre star out of Barbara Steele. His use of light and dark in black-and-white films is widely acclaimed, along with his spectacular use of colour in films such as Black Sabbath, Kill, Baby... Kill!, Blood and Black Lace and The Whip and the Body.

== Later works ==
His work has proven to be very influential. Bava directed two films that are now regarded as the earliest entries in the Italian giallo genre: The Girl Who Knew Too Much (1963) and Blood and Black Lace (1964). His 1965 science fiction horror film Planet of the Vampires was a thematic precursor to Alien (1979). Although comic books had served as the basis for countless serials and children's films in Hollywood, Bava's Danger: Diabolik (1968) brought an adult perspective to the genre; the movie was influenced by Pop artists Andy Warhol and Roy Lichtenstein. Many elements of the 1966 film Kill, Baby... Kill!, regarded by Martin Scorsese as Bava's masterpiece, also appear in the Asian strain of terror film known as J-horror. 1971's A Bay of Blood is considered one of the early slasher films, and was explicitly imitated in Friday the 13th Part 2.

Bava was disappointed with the theatrical distribution of some of his later films. His Lisa and the Devil (1972) was never selected by a distributor. Eventually, in order to get it released, the producer reedited the movie into an Exorcist clone, adding footage shot in 1975, and retitling it House of Exorcism. Bava's Semaforo Rosso (1974) was never released theatrically during his lifetime, and in the late 1990s, it also would be reedited, with new footage added, and retitled; it was released on video as Rabid Dogs. It was released on DVD in 2007, slightly altered and again retitled, as Kidnapped.

In 1977, Bava directed his last horror film, Shock. His son, Lamberto Bava, was an uncredited co-director. The elder Bava later did special effects matte work on Dario Argento's 1980 film Inferno. Bava died suddenly of a heart attack on 27 April 1980, at age 65. His doctor had given him a physical just a few days before, and had pronounced him to be in perfect health. At the time of his death, Bava was about to start shooting a science fiction film titled Star Riders, on which Luigi Cozzi had hoped to collaborate.

== Influence and legacy ==
Although most of Bava's films as director failed to achieve major commercial success upon release, many eventually found acclaim as cult classics, with their content and production values being favourably compared to the works of Alfred Hitchcock. Despite his reputation as a talented artist during his lifetime, Bava's shy, self-deprecating demeanour prevented him from taking advantage of opportunities that would have furthered his international standing within the industry, and he declined multiple opportunities to work in Hollywood.

Bava's son Lamberto worked for fourteen years as his father's assistant director (beginning with Planet of the Vampires), and became a horror film director in his own right. On several of Mario's movies, Mario was credited as John M. Old. Later, Lamberto was sometimes credited as John M. Old Jr. When Lamberto screened his debut film Macabre for his father, Mario commented jokingly to Lamberto: "I am very proud of you. Now I can die in peace". (He actually did die less than two months later.)

Several books have been published about Bava: Mario Bava by Pascal Martinet (Edilig, 1984) and Mario Bava edited by Jean-Louis Leutrat (Éditions du Céfal, 1994) in French; Mario Bava by Alberto Pezzotta (Il Castoro Cinema, 1995) in Italian; The Haunted Worlds of Mario Bava by Troy Howarth (FAB Press, 2002) and most recently, the massive critical biography Mario Bava: All the Colors of the Dark by Tim Lucas (Video Watchdog, 2007; ISBN 0-9633756-1-X).

A documentary, Mario Bava: Maestro of the Macabre, was released in 2000.

Bava's directing style influenced entire generations of filmmakers, including Joe Dante, Martin Scorsese, Quentin Tarantino, Francis Ford Coppola, John Landis, and Tim Burton. Bava and his works have also influenced Dario Argento, Lucio Fulci, Federico Fellini, John Carpenter, David Lynch, Nicolas Winding Refn, Roger Corman, Edgar Wright, and Jennifer Kent.

Movie-mocking TV series Mystery Science Theater 3000 concluded its original ten-season run in 1999 with Danger: Diabolik.

== Filmography ==
=== Film ===
==== Director ====
| Year | Title | Contributed to | | | | Notes | Ref(s) |
| Year | Title | Director | Writer | DoP. | Effects | Notes | Ref(s) |
|---|---|---|---|---|---|---|---|
| 1957 | I Vampiri | Uncredited | No | Yes | Uncredited | Completed the film after Riccardo Freda left production. | |
| 1958 | The Day the Sky Exploded | Uncredited | No | Yes | Uncredited | Uncredited co-director with Paolo Heusch. | |
| 1959 | Caltiki – The Immortal Monster | Uncredited | No | Yes | Yes | Took over direction from Freda. Also actor; as 'Mexican in Police Station' | |
| 1959 | The Giant of Marathon | Uncredited | No | Yes | Yes | Bava shot some additional interiors 10 days prior to the films premiere. | |
| 1960 | Black Sunday | Yes | Yes | Yes | Uncredited | Bava developed the matte paintings and special effects. | |
| 1961 | Hercules in the Haunted World | Yes | Yes | Yes | Yes | | |
| 1961 | Erik the Conqueror | Yes | Yes | Yes | Yes | | |
| 1961 | The Wonders of Aladdin | Yes | No | Yes | Yes | Uncredited as director on U.S. prints. | |
| 1963 | The Girl Who Knew Too Much | Yes | Yes | Yes | Yes | Also actor; as 'Uncle Augusto' | |
| 1963 | Black Sabbath | Yes | Yes | Uncredited | No | | |
| 1963 | The Whip and the Body | Yes | No | No | No | | |
| 1964 | Blood and Black Lace | Yes | Yes | Yes | Yes | | |
| 1964 | The Road to Fort Alamo | Yes | No | Yes | Yes | | |
| 1965 | Planet of the Vampires | Yes | Yes | Yes | Yes | | |
| 1966 | Knives of the Avenger | Yes | Yes | Yes | Yes | | |
| 1966 | Kill, Baby, Kill | Yes | Yes | No | No | | |
| 1966 | Dr. Goldfoot and the Girl Bombs | Yes | No | Yes | Yes | Also actor; as 'Angel with Harp' | |
| 1968 | Danger: Diabolik | Yes | Yes | Yes | Yes | | |
| 1970 | Five Dolls for an August Moon | Yes | No | Yes | Yes | Also editor | |
| 1970 | Hatchet for the Honeymoon | Yes | Yes | Yes | No | | |
| 1970 | Roy Colt & Winchester Jack | Yes | No | Yes | Yes | | |
| 1971 | Four Times That Night | Yes | No | Yes | Yes | | |
| 1971 | A Bay of Blood | Yes | Yes | Yes | Yes | | |
| 1972 | Baron Blood | Yes | Yes | No | No | | |
| 1974 | Lisa and the Devil | Yes | Yes | No | No | | |
| 1977 | Shock | Yes | No | Uncredited | No | | |
| 1998 | Rabid Dogs | Yes | No | Uncredited | No | Filmed in 1974. | |

==== Other production credits ====
| Year | Title | Contributed to | | | Director | Notes | Ref(s) |
| Year | Title | DoP. | Effects | Other | Director | Notes | Ref(s) |
|---|---|---|---|---|---|---|---|
| 1937 | Scipio Africanus: The Defeat of Hannibal | No | No | Uncredited | Carmine Gallone | Title designer | |
| 1938 | Doctor Antonio | No | No | Uncredited | Enrico Guazzoni | Camera assistant | |
| 1938 | Princess Tarakanova | No | No | Uncredited | Fyodor Otsep Mario Soldati | Camera assistant | |
| 1938 | Giuseppe Verdi | No | No | Uncredited | Carmine Gallone | Camera assistant | |
| 1938 | Inventiamo l'amore | No | No | Uncredited | Camillo Mastrocinque | Camera assistant | |
| 1939 | The Silent Partner | Addtl. | No | No | Roberto Roberti | Additional photography | |
| 1940 | La Comédie du bonheur | No | No | Uncredited | Marcel L'Herbier | Camera assistant | |
| 1941 | La compagna della teppa | No | No | Uncredited | Corrado D'Errico | Camera assistant | |
| 1941 | Men on the Sea Floor | Yes | Yes | No | Francesco De Robertis | | |
| 1942 | Capitan Tempesta | No | No | Yes | Corrado D'Errico | Camera assistant | |
| 1942 | The White Ship | No | Yes | Yes | Roberto Rossellini | Camera assistant | |
| 1942 | Alfa tau! | Addtl. | Yes | No | Francesco De Robertis | | |
| 1943 | Uomini e cieli | Addtl. | Yes | No | Francesco De Robertis | | |
| 1943 | Annabella's Adventure | Yes | No | No | Leo Menardi | | |
| 1943 | Sant'Elena, piccola isola | Yes | No | No | Umberto Scarpelli Renato Simoni | | |
| 1946 | Montecassino nel cerchio di fuoco | Addtl. | No | No | Arturo Gemmiti | | |
| 1946 | The Barber of Seville | No | No | Uncredited | Mario Costa | Camera assistant | |
| 1947 | Elisir d'amore | Yes | No | No | Mario Costa | | |
| 1947 | Christmas at Camp 119 | Yes | No | No | Pietro Francisci | | |
| 1948 | Mad About Opera | Yes | No | No | Mario Costa | | |
| 1948 | Pagliacci | Yes | Yes | No | Mario Costa | | |
| 1949 | Antonio de Padova | Yes | Yes | No | Pietro Francisci | | |
| 1950 | My Beautiful Daughter | Yes | Yes | No | Duilio Coletti | | |
| 1950 | The Lion of Amalfi | Yes | Yes | No | Pietro Francisci | | |
| 1950 | The Knight Has Arrived! | Yes | Yes | No | Mario Monicelli Steno | | |
| 1950 | Song of Spring | Yes | Yes | No | Mario Costa | | |
| 1950 | Her Favourite Husband | Yes | Yes | No | Mario Soldati | | |
| 1950 | A Dog's Life | Yes | No | No | Mario Monicelli; Steno | | |
| 1951 | Cops and Robbers | Yes | No | No | Mario Monicelli; Steno | | |
| 1951 | Amor non ho... però... però | Yes | No | No | Giorgio Bianchi | | |
| 1951 | The Passaguai Family | Yes | Yes | No | Aldo Fabrizi | | |
| 1952 | The Passaguai Family Gets Rich | Yes | Yes | No | Aldo Fabrizi | | |
| 1952 | Papà diventa mamma | No | Yes | No | Aldo Fabrizi | | |
| 1952 | Sunday Heroes | Yes | No | No | Mario Camerini | | |
| 1953 | Sins of Rome | Uncredited | No | No | Riccardo Freda | | |
| 1953 | Perdonami! | Yes | No | No | Mario Costa | | |
| 1953 | Il viale della speranza | Yes | Yes | No | Dino Risi | | |
| 1953 | Balocchi e profumi | Yes | No | No | F.M. De Bernardi; Natale Montillo | | |
| 1953 | It Happened in the Park | Yes | No | No | Gianni Franciolini | | |
| 1954 | High School | Yes | No | No | Luciano Emmer | | |
| 1954 | Cose da pazzi | Yes | Yes | No | G. W. Pabst | | |
| 1954 | Graziella | Yes | No | No | Giorgio Bianchi | | |
| 1954 | Hanno rubato un tram | Yes | Yes | No | Mario Bonnard; Aldo Fabrizi | | |
| 1954 | Theodora, Slave Empress | Addtl. | Yes | No | Riccardo Freda | | |
| 1955 | Buonanotte... avvocato! | Yes | No | No | Giorgio Bianchi | | |
| 1955 | Non ch'e amore piu grande | Yes | No | No | Giorgio Bianchi | | |
| 1955 | Sins of Casanova | Yes | No | No | Steno | | |
| 1955 | La donna piu bella del mondo | Yes | Yes | No | Robert Z. Leonard | | |
| 1955 | Da qui all'ereditta | Addtl. | Yes | No | Riccardo Freda | | |
| 1956 | Beatrice Cenci | No | Yes | No | Riccardo Freda | | |
| 1956 | Nero's Mistress | Yes | No | No | Steno | | |
| 1956 | Roland the Mighty | Yes | Yes | No | Pietro Francisci | | |
| 1958 | Hercules | Yes | Yes | No | Pietro Francisci | | |
| 1958 | Città di notte | Yes | No | No | Leopoldo Trieste | | |
| 1958 | Toto in Paris | Yes | Yes | No | Camillo Mastrocinque | | |
| 1959 | Hercules Unchained | Yes | Yes | No | Pietro Francisci | | |
| 1959 | Sheba and the Gladiator | Uncredited | No | No | Guido Brignone; Riccardo Freda; Michelangelo Antonioni | | |
| 1959 | The White Warrior | Yes | No | No | Riccardo Freda | | |
| 1962 | The Witch's Curse | No | Uncredited | No | Riccardo Freda | | |
| 1980 | Inferno | No | Uncredited | No | Dario Argento | Bava created some optical effects, painted maquettes, and other trick shots. | |

=== Television ===
| Year | Title | Contributed to | | | | Notes | Ref(s) |
| Year | Title | Director | Writer | DoP. | Effects | Notes | Ref(s) |
|---|---|---|---|---|---|---|---|
| 1968 | The Odyssey | Yes | No | No | Yes | Miniseries; 2 episodes | |
| 1979 | The Devil's Game | Yes | No | No | No | Miniseries; 1 episode | |

== See also ==
- European art cinema
- Exploitation film
- Cinema of Italy
- Italian science fiction cinema

== Bibliography ==
- Kinnard, Roy; Crnkovich, Tony (2017). Italian Sword and Sandal Films, 1908-1990. McFarland. ISBN 978-1476662916.
- Curti, Roberto (2013). Italian Crime Filmography, 1968-1980. McFarland. ISBN 978-0786469765.
- Curti, Roberto (2015). Italian Gothic Horror Films, 1957–1969. McFarland. ISBN 978-1-4766-1989-7.
- Curti, Roberto (2017). Italian Gothic Horror Films, 1970-1979. McFarland. ISBN 978-1476629605.
- Curti, Roberto (2017b). Riccardo Freda: The Life and Works of a Born Filmmaker. McFarland. ISBN 978-1476628387.
- Curti, Roberto (2019). Italian Gothic Horror Films, 1980-1989. McFarland. ISBN 978-1476672434.
- Hughes, Howard (2011). Cinema Italiano - The Complete Guide From Classics To Cult. London - New York: I.B.Tauris. ISBN 978-1-84885-608-0.
- Lucas, Tim (2013). Mario Bava - All the Colors of the Dark. Video Watchdog. ISBN 978-0-9633756-1-2.
