= Carlo Delle Piane =

Italian actor (1936–2019)

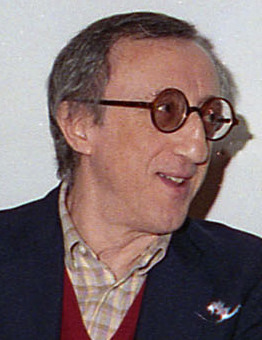
- Delle Piane in 1995
- Born: 2 February 1936; Rome, Kingdom of Italy
- Died: 23 August 2019 (aged 83); Rome, Italy
- Occupation: Actor
- Years active: 1948–2019

Carlo Delle Piane (2 February 1936 – 23 August 2019) was an Italian film actor. From 1948 until his death, he appeared in more than 100 films.

Born in Rome, Delle Piane made his debut at the age of twelve in Duilio Coletti's Heart; he starred in the stereotypical role of an arrogant but basically kind-hearted boy in many films until the mid-fifties. The turning point of his career was the encounter with Pupi Avati, with whom Delle Piane experienced more significant and varied roles, going from comic surreal performances to melancholic and even dramatic shades.

In 1984, he won the Nastro d'Argento for Best Actor for his performance in A School Outing. For his role in Christmas Present he won the Volpi Cup at the 43rd Venice International Film Festival.

== Selected filmography ==
- Heart and Soul (1948)
- Ring Around the Clock (1950)
- Tomorrow Is Too Late (1950)
- Beauties in Capri (1951)
- The Passaguai Family (1951)
- Cops and Robbers (1951)
- Mamma Mia, What an Impression! (1951)
- I'm the Capataz (1951)
- The Passaguai Family Gets Rich (1952)
- The Piano Tuner Has Arrived (1952)
- Papà diventa mamma (1952)
- Lieutenant Giorgio (1952)
- A Thief in Paradise (1952)
- Man, Beast and Virtue (1953)
- Submarine Attack (1954)
- An American in Rome (1954)
- La ladra (1955)
- Serenata per sedici bionde (1957)
- No Sun in Venice) (1957)
- Ladro lui, ladra lei (1958)
- Adorabili e bugiarde (1958)
- Fortunella (1958)
- The Friend of the Jaguar (1959)
- Quanto sei bella Roma (1959)
- Un mandarino per Teo (1960)
- Toto and Cleopatra (1963)
- The Monk of Monza (1963)
- Toto vs. the Four (1963)
- After the Fox (1966)
- Perdono (1966)
- Sexy Susan Sins Again (1968)
- Don Chisciotte and Sancio Panza (1968)
- The Archangel (1969)
- Pensiero d'amore (1969)
- What? (1972)
- Without Family (1972)
- Poker in Bed (1974)
- The School Teacher (1975)
- Una bella governante di colore (1976)
- The Lady Medic (1976)
- The Stars in the Ditch (1979)
- A School Outing (1983)
- The Three of Us (1984)
- Graduation Party (1985)
- Christmas Present (1986)
- Days of Inspector Ambrosio (1988)
- Condominio (1991)
- Declarations of Love (1994)
- An American Love (1994)
- Io e il re (1995)
- Midsummer Night's Dance (1999)
- The Knights of the Quest (2001)
- Christmas Rematch (2004)
- Tickets (2005)
- Sorry, You Can't Get Through! (2005)
