= The Za-Bum Circus =

1944 film by Mario Mattoli

- Directed by: Mario Mattoli
- Written by: Marcello Marchesi; Mario Mattoli; Vittorio Metz
- Starring: Galeazzo Bentii
- Cinematography: Carlo Montuori
- Production company: Titanus
- Release date: April 1944
- Running time: 85 minutes
- Country: Italy
- Language: Italian

The Za-Bum Circus (Italian: Circo equestre Za-bum) is a 1944 Italian comedy film directed by Mario Mattoli and starring Galeazzo Benti.

== Cast ==
- Galeazzo Benti (segment "Galop finale al circo")
- Carlo Campanini(segment "Gelosia")
- Vera Carmi (segment "Galop finale al circo")
- Ada Dondini (segment "Galop finale al circo")
- Aldo Fabrizi as The postman (segments "Dalla finestra" and "Il postino")
- Roldano Lupi (segments "Contatto telefonici", "Gelosia" and "Galop finale al circo")
- Ave Ninchi (segment "Galop finale al circo")
- Carlo Ninchi (segments "Contatto telefonici" and "Galop finale al circo")
