= Una bruna indiavolata! =

- Directed by: Carlo Ludovico Bragaglia
- Written by: Age & Scarpelli
- Cinematography: Tino Santoni
- Music by: Carlo Innocenzi
- Release date: 1951
- Country: Italy
- Language: Italian

Una bruna indiavolata! is a 1951 Italian comedy film directed by Carlo Ludovico Bragaglia.

== Cast ==
- Silvana Pampanini as Clara
- Ugo Tognazzi as Carlo Soldi
- Nando Bruno as Autista del taxi
- Carlo Sposito as Giulio Scanagatta
- Rocco D'Assunta as Il ladro
- Luigi Pavese as Commissario
- Virgilio Riento as Cameriere
- Nino Milano as Dino
- Anna Campori as Signora Cartoni
- Alfredo Rizzo as Finto testimone
- Ughetto Bertucci as Camionista
- Liana Del Balzo as Mamma di Giulio
- Gigi Reder as Cameriere al bar della stazione
