= Of Life and Love =

1954 film

Of Life and Love (Questa è la vita)
- Film poster
- Directed by: Aldo Fabrizi; Giorgio Pastina; Mario Soldati; Luigi Zampa
- Written by: Aldo Fabrizi, Vitaliano Brancati, Giorgio Bassani, Luigi Zampa, Mario Soldati, Giorgio Pastina (from Luigi Pirandello's tales)
- Produced by: Felice Zappulla
- Starring: Turi Pandolfini, Aldo Fabrizi, Totò, Emilio Cigoli, Domenico Modugno
- Cinematography: Giuseppe La Torre
- Edited by: Eraldo Da Roma
- Music by: Armando Trovajoli, Carlo Innocenzi
- Distributed by: Titanus
- Release date: 1954
- Running time: 96 minutes
- Country: Italy
- Language: Italian

Of Life and Love (Italian: Questa è la vita) is a 1954 Italian comedy film directed by Aldo Fabrizi, Giorgio Pastina, Mario Soldati and Luigi Zampa.

== Plot ==
The film tells four episodes from stories written by Luigi Pirandello (from the work: Novelle per un anno).

=== The jar ===
A landowner ignorant and arrogant he is afraid that his big jar is broken because of a storm that is coming and he entrusts it to one of its employees silly that the rocks. The owner angrily dismisses the man and called Zi 'Dima, the master repairman to fix the jar, but they get stuck in there.

=== Ventaglino ===
A woman spends all his possessions for a fan and starts to play the role of a prostitute.

=== The license ===
Rosario chiarchiaro she won the enmity of his countrymen because he wants to settle the "license Evil Eye" so that his family can live in more favorable conditions. To do this, disguises herself as a true bearer of bad luck (think that Toto had a great fear for jettatori) finally getting his job

=== Tight Formal Wear ===
The portly professor Fabio Gori (Fabrizi) is invited to the wedding of one of his former students, for which he borrows a set of formal wear, which is hopelessly too small for him, but which he insists on wearing. Arriving at her house, he discovers that the bride's mother has died from the excitement of seeing her daughter wed. The groom's rich and arrogant family are opposed to the marriage and try to take advantage of the situation to postpone the wedding indefinitely. Gori knows that the groom is a good man and that he would make his ex-student happy. Knowing that if he doesn't act, the relatives will be able to divide the couple definitively, he insists that the matrimony go ahead despite the misfortune. In the end he confesses that he found the strength to react to the hypocritical protests of the groom's relatives because of his irritability due to wearing such a tight garment.

The film is presented by actor and voice actor Emilio Cigoli, located in dubbing room, he explains the meaning of the four episodes.

== Cast ==
- Turi Pandolfini: Zi' Dima (segment "La giara")
- Antonio Nicotra: Don Lolò Zirafa (segment "La giara")
- Domenico Modugno: Tamantino (segment "La giara")
- Franca Gandolfi: Daughter (segment "La giara")
- Myriam Bru: Tuta (segment "Il ventaglio")
- Pina Piovani: Daughter (segment "Il ventaglio")
- Totò: Rosario Chiarchiaro (segment "La patente")
- Armenia Balducci: Rosinella Chiarchiaro (segment "La patente")
- Mario Castellani: Judge (segment "La patente")
- Anita Durante: Wife (segment "La patente")
- Virna Lisi: Daughter (segment "La patente")
- Aldo Fabrizi: Professor Fabio Gori (segment "Marsina stretta")
- Lucia Bosè: Angela Reis (segment "Marsina stretta")
- Walter Chiari: Andrea Migri (segment "Marsina stretta")
- Zoe Incrocci: Andrea's sister (segment "Marsina stretta")
