= Carlo Innocenzi =

Italian composer (1899–1962)

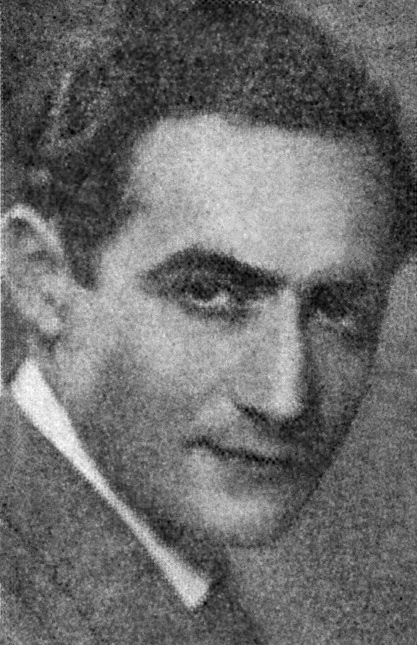
- Born: 29 April 1899; Monteleone di Spoleto, Perugia, Kingdom of Italy
- Died: 24 March 1962 (aged 62); Rome, Italy

Carlo Innocenzi (29 April 1899 – 24 March 1962) was an Italian composer.

== Life and career ==
Born in Monteleone di Spoleto, Innocenzi is best known as a composer of musical scores for films; he composed over 150 film scores since 1933. From 1958 until his death, he focused on peplum film scores.

Innocenzi also composed several pop songs, and some of them were not only commercial hits but also became instant classics, notably "Mille lire al mese" and "Valeria ragazza poco seria". He was married to Sonia Pearlwing, who, under the name of Marcella Rivi, was the author of the lyrics for several songs composed by him.

== Selected filmography ==
- A Thousand Lire a Month (1939)
- The First Woman Who Passes (1940)
- Light in the Darkness (1941)
- Disturbance (1942)
- Invisible Chains (1942)
- Two Hearts (1943)
- Un uomo ritorna (1946)
- Anthony of Padua (1949)
- Welcome, Reverend! (1950)
- Song of Spring (1951)
- Auguri e figli maschi! (1951)
- The Passaguai Family (1951)
- Una bruna indiavolata! (1951)
- Three Girls from Rome (1952)
- A Mother Returns (1952)
- The Passaguai Family Gets Rich (1952)
- Article 519, Penal Code (1952)
- One Hundred Little Mothers (1952)
- Prisoners of Darkness (1952)
- One of Those (1953)
- My Life Is Yours (1953)
- Past Lovers (1953)
- Matrimonial Agency (1953)
- Of Life and Love (1954)
- Tears of Love (1954)
- Love Song (1954)
- The Island Monster (1954)
- The Boatman of Amalfi (1954)
- It Happened at the Police Station (1954)
- The Prince with the Red Mask (1955)
- The Courier of Moncenisio (1956)
- Il seduttore (1956)
- The Knight of the Black Sword (1956)
- Andalusia Express (1956)
- Supreme Confession (1956)
- The Lady Doctor (1957)
- Captain Falcon (1958)
- Il marito (1959)
- Attack of the Moors (1959)
- La cambiale (1959)
- The Two Rivals (1960)
- The Loves of Hercules (1960)
- David and Goliath (1960)
- Mill of the Stone Women (1960)
- Samson (1961)
- The Centurion (1961)
- Atlas in the Land of the Cyclops (1961)
- Samson and the Seven Miracles of the World (1961)
- The Vengeance of Ursus (1961)
- The Seven Revenges (1961)
- Revolt of the Mercenaries (1961)
- Goliath Against the Giants (1961)
- The Fury of Hercules (1962)
