= Elena Fabrizi =

Italian actress (1915–1993)

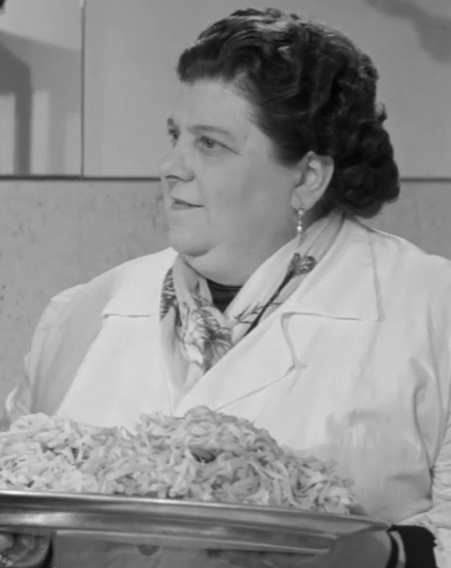
- Fabrizi in Toto, Fabrizi and the Young People Today (1960)
- Born: Elena Fabbrizi; 17 June 1915; Rome, Kingdom of Italy
- Died: 9 August 1993 (aged 78); Rome, Italy
- Other names: Sora Lella; Lella Fabrizi
- Occupations: Actress; television personality
- Relatives: Aldo Fabrizi (brother)

Elena "Lella" Fabrizi (Italian pronunciation: [ˈɛːlena ˈlɛlla faˈbrittsi]; born Elena Fabbrizi; 17 June 1915 – 9 August 1993), popularly known as Sora Lella (Romanesco for "Mrs. Lella"), was an Italian stage, television and film actress, and a television personality. She was both a Silver Ribbon and David di Donatello awardee, most prestigious Italian awards for a career in acting.

== Life and career ==
Born in Rome, Italy, the younger sister of the actor and director Aldo, in the late 1950s Fabrizi started occasionally appearing in films, considering the acting career just a hobby, being her true profession the restaurateur and gastronome. Mainly used for very little character roles, her acting career had her peak in early 1980s, thanks to a series of films directed by Carlo Verdone in which she played the typical role of the good-natured, grumbling grandmother. For her role in Bianco, rosso e Verdone Fabrizi won a Silver Ribbon for Best New Actress, while in 1984 she won a David di Donatello for Best Supporting Actress for her performance in Acqua e sapone.

Fabrizi was also a busy television personality, and for a long time she was a regular guest on the television program Maurizio Costanzo Show. She suffered from diabetes, and died of a stroke at Fatebenefratelli Hospital in Rome. She was a supporter of S.S. Lazio.

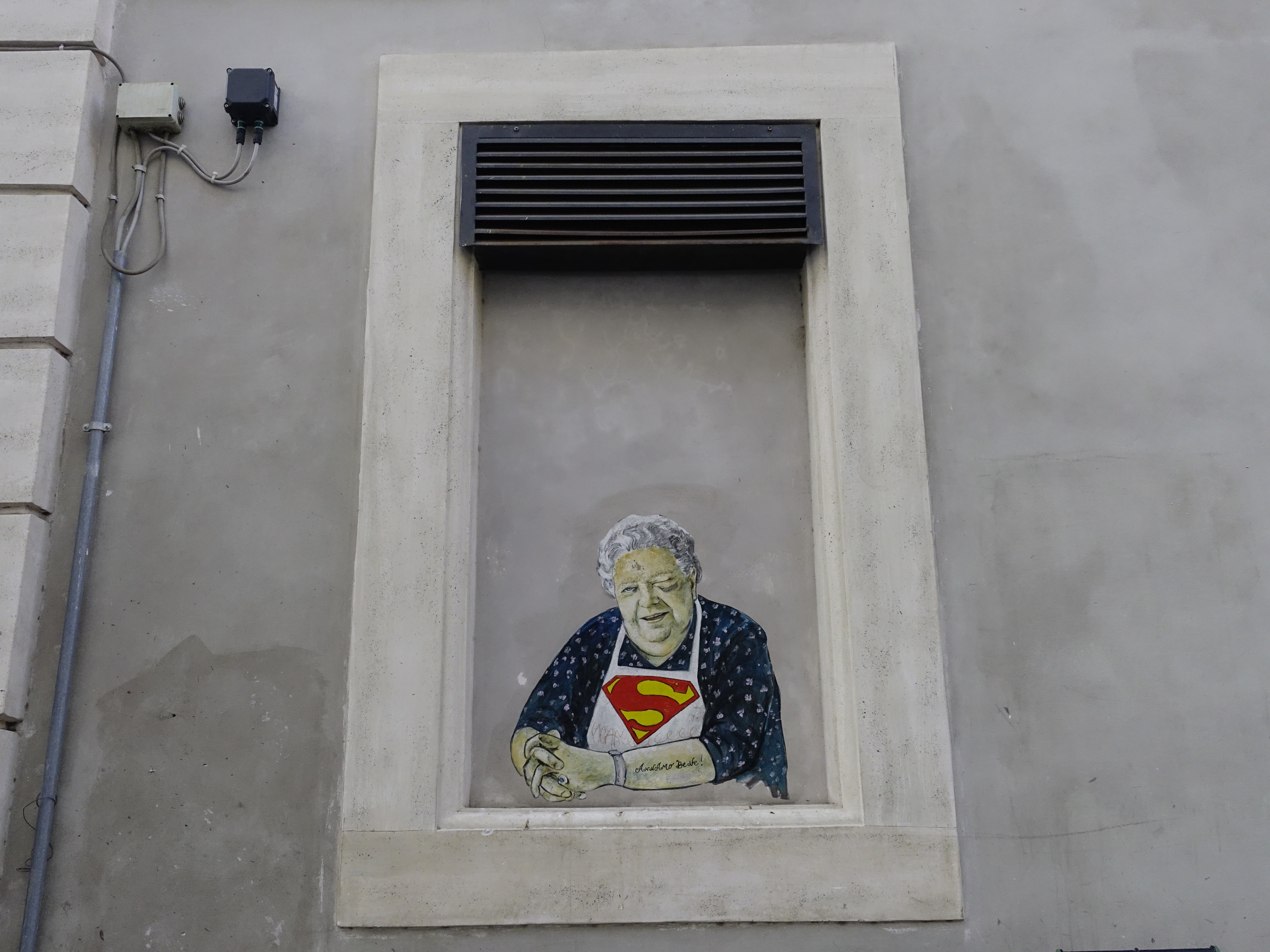
Mural in Rome celebrating Sora Lella
