= Aldo Fabrizi =

Italian actor, director

Aldo Fabrizi OMRI
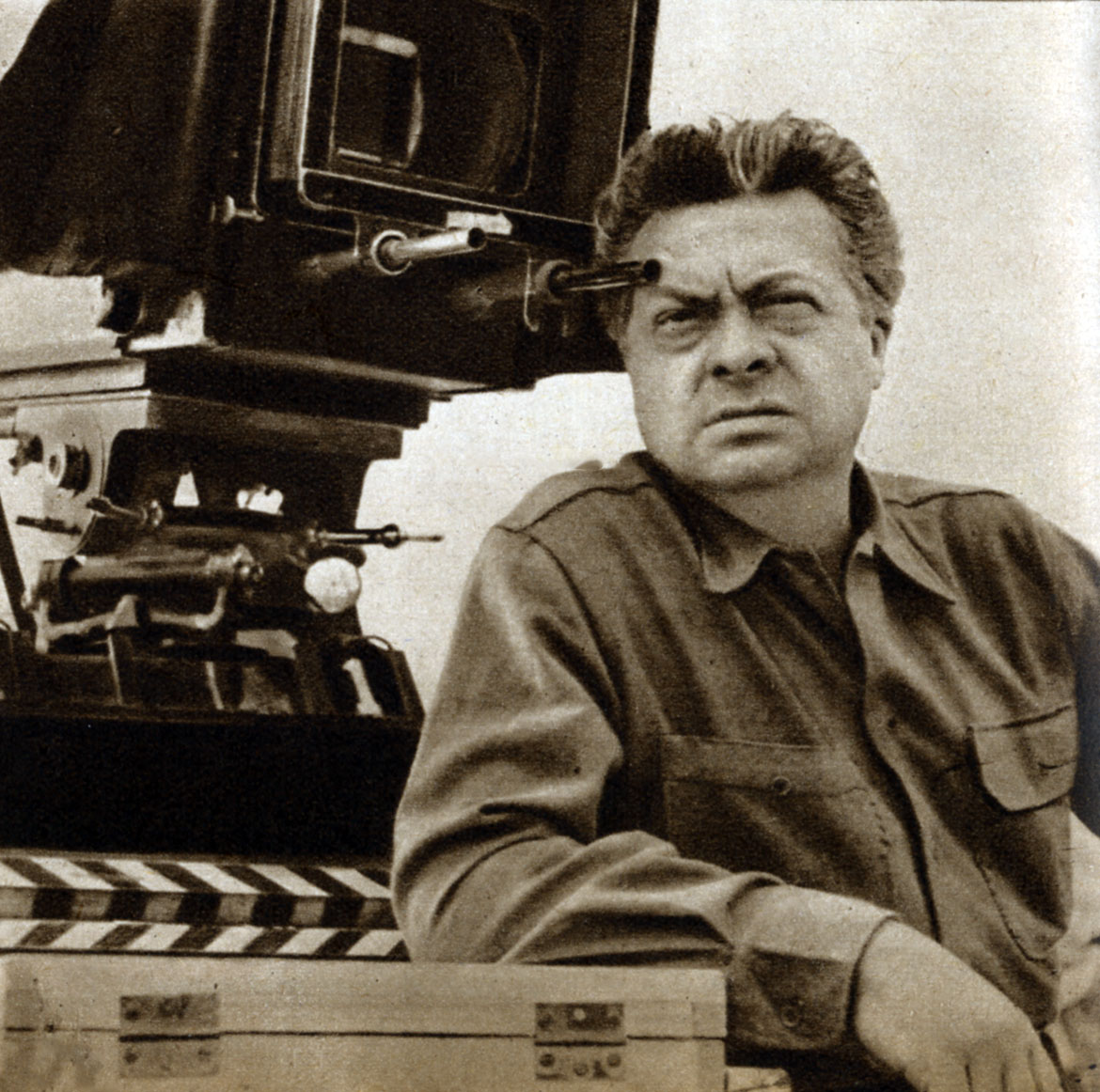
- Fabrizi on the set
- Born: Aldo Fabbrizi; 1 November 1905; Rome, Kingdom of Italy
- Died: 2 April 1990 (aged 84); Rome, Italy
- Occupations: Actor; film director; screenwriter; comedian
- Height: 1.68 m (5 ft 6 in)
- Spouse: Beatrice Rocchi (died 1981)
- Relatives: Elena Fabrizi (sister)

Aldo Fabrizi (Italian pronunciation: [ˈaldo faˈbrittsi]; born Aldo Fabbrizi; 1 November 1905 – 2 April 1990) was an Italian actor, director, screenwriter and comedian, best known for the role of the heroic priest in Roberto Rossellini's Rome, Open City and as partner of Totò in a number of successful comedies.

== Life and career ==
Born in Rome into a humble family, Fabrizi debuted on stage in a suburban theater in 1931. He soon got local success thanks to his comical sketches and macchiette (i.e. comical monologues caricaturing stock characters), and became a star of the Roman revue and avanspettacolo. He made his film debut during the war, in 1942, and in a short time established himself as one of the most talented actors of the time, spacing from comedy to drama. After a number of successful comedies, in 1945 he played the iconic Don Pietro in the neo-realist drama Rome, Open City, and following the critical and commercial success of the film he had a number of leading roles in other neo-realist films. Already active as a screenwriter, in 1948 he debuted as a director with the drama Immigrants. In the 1950s and 1960s he was often paired on the screen with Totò and with Peppino De Filippo. In 1964 he got a large success on stage with the musical comedy Rugantino, he also toured across Europe, in Latin America and in Broadway.

Like the Italian actor Totò and others, Fabrizi was also initiated to the Scottish Rite Freemasonry.

=== Personal life ===
Fabrizi was married to the singer Beatrice Rocchi, best known with her stage name Reginella, until her death in 1981. His sister Elena Fabrizi was also an actress. He died on April 2, 1990.

=== Awards and recognition ===
Fabrizi during his career won two Nastro d'Argento Awards, for best actor for Alessandro Blasetti's Father's Dilemma and for best supporting actor in Ettore Scola's We All Loved Each Other So Much, and a special David di Donatello for his career in 1988. He was also awarded at the 1952 Cannes Film Festival for best screenplay for Cops and Robbers. In 1990 Poste italiane issued a stamp in his honor.

== Actor filmography ==
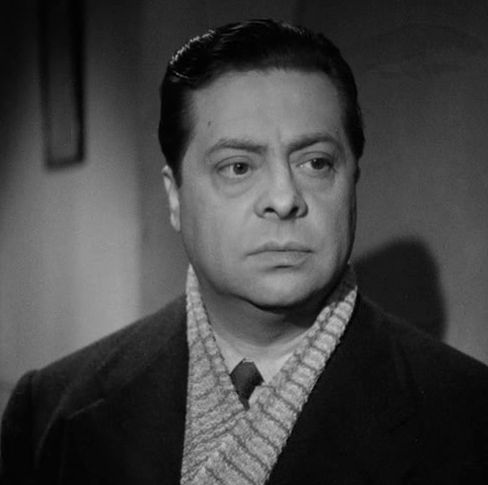
Fabrizi in The Peddler and the Lady (1943)

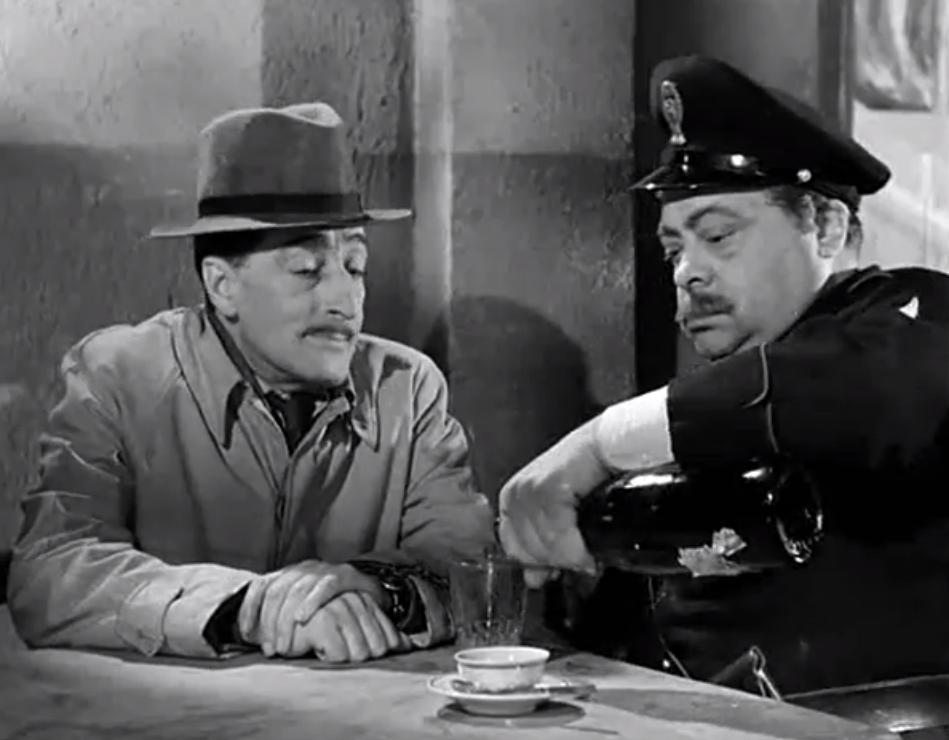
Totò and Fabrizi in Cops and Robbers (1951)

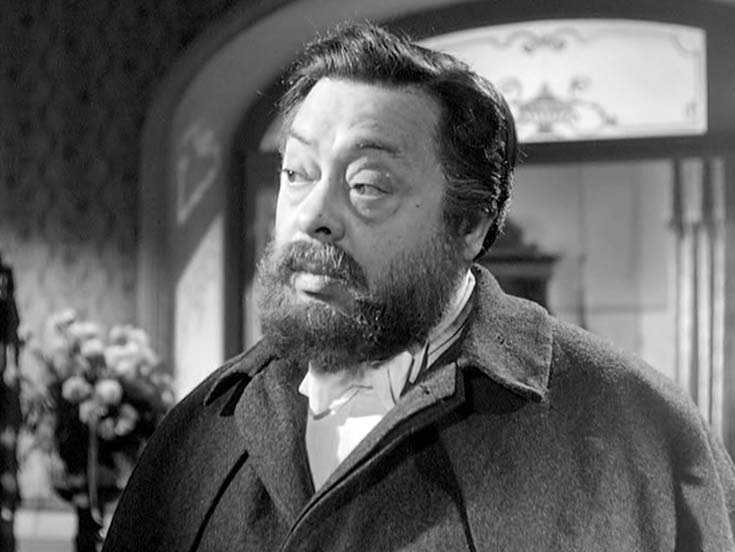
Fabrizi in Of Life and Love (1954)

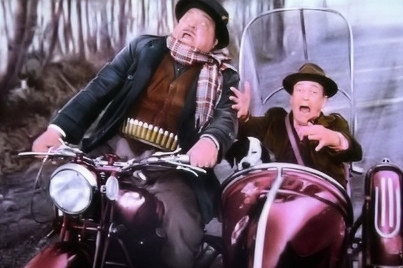
Totò and Fabrizi in The Overtaxed (1959)

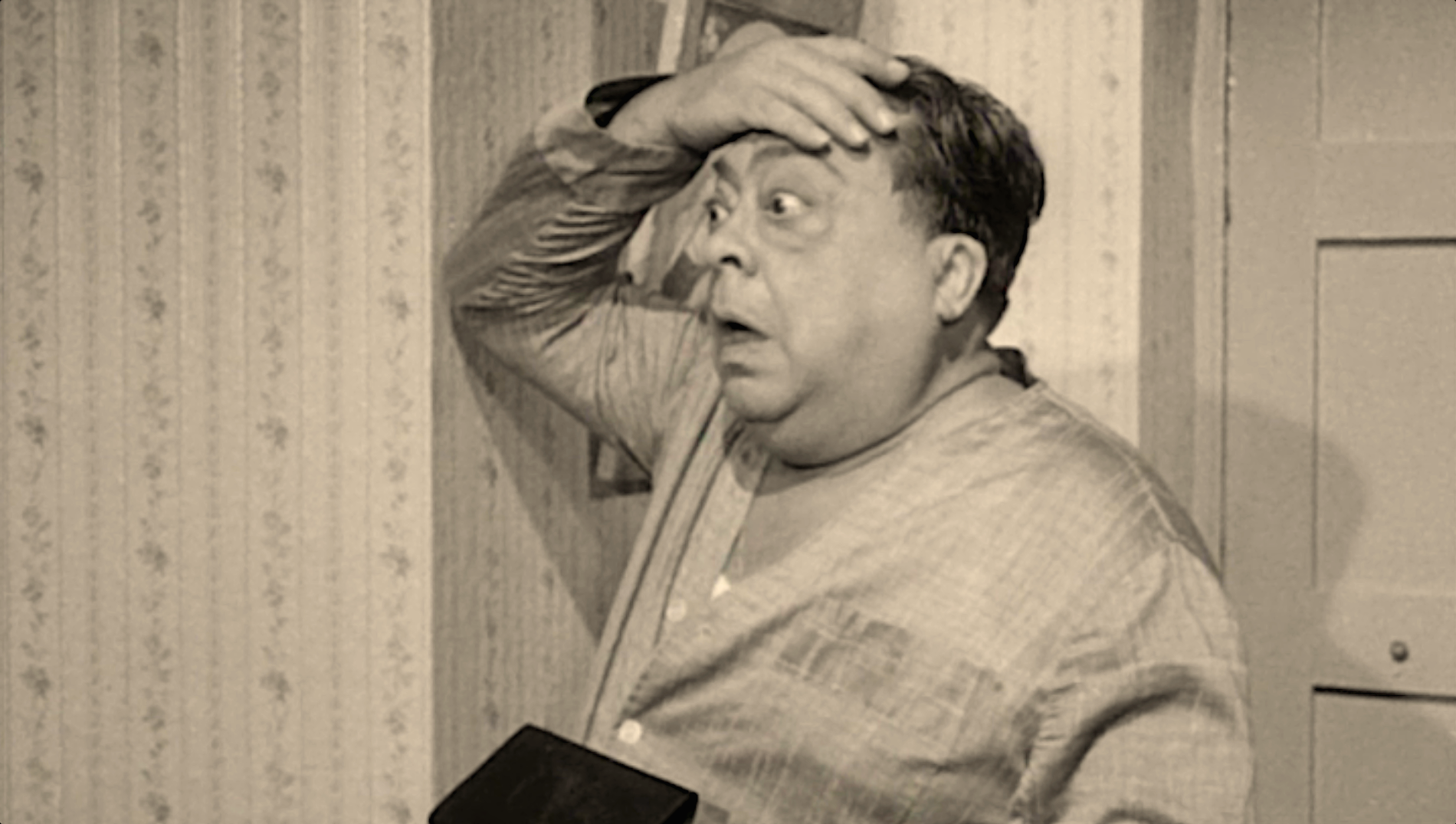
Fabrizi in Gli italiani e le donne, episode "Chi la fa, l'aspetti" (1962)

- Before the Postman by Mario Bonnard (script too) (1942) as Cesare Montani
- The Peddler and the Lady by Mario Bonnard (script too) (1943) as Peppino Corradini
- The Last Wagon by Mario Mattoli (script too) (1943) as Antonio Urbani, detto "Toto"
- The Za-Bum Circus by Mario Mattoli (1944) as The postman (segments "Dalla finestra" and "Il postino")
- Rome, Open City by Roberto Rossellini (1945) as Don Pietro Pellegrini
- Professor, My Son by Renato Castellani (script too) (1946) as Orazio Belli
- To Live in Peace by Luigi Zampa (script too ) (1947) as Tigna
- Il vento m'ha cantato una canzone by Camillo Mastrocinque
- Flesh Will Surrender by Alberto Lattuada (script too) (1947) as Giovanni Episcopo
- Tombolo, paradiso nero by Giorgio Ferroni (1947) as Andrea Rascelli
- Christmas at Camp 119 by Pietro Francisci (script too) (1947) as Giuseppe Mancini, il romano
- Emigrantes by Aldo Fabrizi (1948) as Giuseppe Bordoni
- Welcome, Reverend! by Aldo Fabrizi (1949) as Don Peppino
- The Flowers of St. Francis by Roberto Rossellini (1950) as Nicolaio, il tiranno di Viterbo
- Father's Dilemma by Alessandro Blasetti (1950) as Carlo Carloni
- A Dog's Life by Steno & Mario Monicelli (script too) (1950) as Nino Martoni
- Anthony of Padua by Pietro Francisci (1951) as Ezzelino Da Romano
- Three Steps North by William Lee Wilder (1950) as Pietro
- Rome-Paris-Rome by Luigi Zampa (1951) as Vincenzo Nardi
- Cameriera bella presenza offresi... by Giorgio Pastina (1951) as Il commendatore Giovanni Marchetti
- Paris Is Always Paris by Luciano Emmer (1951) as Andrea De Angelis
- Cops and Robbers by Steno & Mario Monicelli (script too) (1951) as Lorenzo Bottoni
- The Passaguai Family by Aldo Fabrizi (1951) as Giuseppe Passaguai
- Fiorenzo il terzo uomo by Stefano Canzio (cameo) (1951) as Guest star
- The Passaguai Family Gets Rich by Aldo Fabrizi (1952) as Giuseppe Passaguai
- Papà diventa mamma by Aldo Fabrizi (1952) as Sor Pepe
- In Olden Days by Alessandro Blasetti (1952) as Bookseller (segment Il carrettino dei libri vecchi)
- Five Paupers in an Automobile by Mario Mattoli (script too) (1952) as Cesare Baroni
- One of Those by Aldo Fabrizi (1953) as Un medico
- Siamo tutti inquilini by Mario Mattoli (1953) as Augusto
- La voce del silenzio by Georg Wilhelm Pabst (1953) as Pio Fabiani
- Too Young for Love by Lionello De Felice (1953) as Coletti, padre di Annette
- Funniest Show on Earth by Mario Mattoli (1953) (uncredited)
- Cafè Chantant by Camillo Mastrocinque (1953) as Himself
- Of Life and Love by Aldo Fabrizi (1954) as Professor Fabio Gori (segment "Marsina stretta")
- 100 Years of Love by Lionello De Felice (1954) as Don Pietro, Priest of Monterotondo (segment "Garibaldina")
- Cose da pazzi by Georg Wilhelm Pabst (1954) as Gnauli
- Carousel of Variety by Aldo Quinti & Aldo Bonaldi (1955)
- Accadde al penitenziario by Giorgio Bianchi (1955)
- Io piaccio by Giorgio Bianchi (1955) as Giuseppe Tassinetti
- I pappagalli by Bruno Paolinelli (1955) as Antonio, the door-keeper
- Un po' di cielo by Giorgio Moser (1955) as Pietro Maltoni
- The Two Friends by Carlo Borghesio (script too) (1955) as Giovanni Bellini
- I pinguini ci guardano by Guido Leoni (1956) (voice)
- They Stole a Tram by Aldo Fabrizi (1956) as Cesare Mancini
- Guardia, guardia scelta, brigadiere e maresciallo by Mauro Bolognini (1956) as Brigadiere Pietro Spaziani
- Donatella by Mario Monicelli (1956) as Padre di Donatella
- Allow Me, Daddy! by Mario Bonnard (1956) as Alessandro Biagi - il suocero di Nardi
- Il maestro by Aldo Fabrizi (1957) as Giovanni Merino
- Festa di maggio (Premier mai) by Luis Saslavsky (1958) as Le vieux camionneur
- I prepotenti di Mario Amendola (script too) (1958) as Cesare Pinelli
- The Overtaxed by Steno (script too) (1959) as Maresciallo Fabio Topponi
- Ferdinando I re di Napoli by Gianni Franciolini (1959) as Il contadino
- Prepotenti più di prima by Mario Mattoli (script too) (1959) as Cesare Pinelli
- Un militare e mezzo by Steno (script too) (1960) as Sgt. Giovanni Rossi
- The Angel Wore Red by Nunnally Johnson (1960) as Canon Rota
- Toto, Fabrizi and the Young People Today by Mario Mattoli (1960) as Giuseppe D'Amore
- The Wonders of Aladdin by Mario Bava (1961) as Sultan
- Gerarchi si muore by Giorgio Simonelli (1961) as Comm. Frioppi
- Fra' Manisco cerca guai by Armando William Tamburella (1961) as Fra Pacifico detto 'Fra Manisco'
- Gli italiani e le donne (episode Chi la fa, l'aspetti) by Marino Girolami (1962)
- Twist, lolite e vitelloni by Marino Girolami (1962) as Cav. Rossi
- The Four Monks by Carlo Ludovico Bragaglia (1962) as Fra' Giocondo
- The Four Musketeers by Carlo Ludovico Bragaglia (1963) as Bouboule
- The Shortest Day by Sergio Corbucci (cameo) (1963) as Facchino
- The Lightship by Ladislao Vajda (in Germany) (1963) as Don Amilcare
- Toto vs. the Four by Steno (1963) as
- I quattro tassisti by Giorgio Bianchi (1963) as Sor Gigi (segment "L'uomo in blue")
- Made in Italy by Nanni Loy (1965) as Piras, Gaviro's Father (segment "2 'Il Lavoro', episode 2")
- Sette monaci d'oro by Marino Girolami (1966) as Fra' Ugone, padre priore
- Three Bites of the Apple by Alvin Ganzer (1967) as Dr. Manzoni
- Gang War by Steno (script too) (1971) as Brigadiere Aldo Panzarani
- La Tosca by Luigi Magni (1973) as Il governatore
- We All Loved Each Other So Much by Ettore Scola (1974) as Romolo Catenacci
- I baroni by Giampaolo Lomi (1975) as Monsignore
- Nerone by Mario Castellacci & Pier Francesco Pingitore (1977) as Generale Galba
- Ladies' Doctor by Aristide Massaccesi (1977) as Pietro Massone
- Giovanni Senzapensieri by Marco Colli (1985) as Gino (final film role)

== Film director filmography ==
- Emigrantes (script too) (1948)
- Welcome, Reverend! (producer and script too) (1949)
- The Passaguai Family (producer and script too) (1951)
- The Passaguai Family Gets Rich (producer and script too) (1952)
- Papà diventa mamma (producer and script too) (1952)
- One of Those (producer and script too) (1953)
- Of Life and Love (episode Marsina stretta, script too) (1954)
- They Stole a Tram (script too) (1954)
- Il maestro (script too) (1957)
