= Variety Distribution =

Italian-based film distribution company

- Company type: Privately held company
- Industry: Film distribution
- Founded: 1945
- Headquarters: Rome, Italy
- Area served: Worldwide
- Website: www.varietydistribution.it/en

Variety Distribution is an Italian-based film distribution company.

It distributes Italian films worldwide, produced from the 1930s onward.

== History ==
Variety Distribution (formerly Variety Film and Variety Communications) has been in the film production and distribution business worldwide since 1945. The company manages the rights for all types of exploitation, including on digital platforms, of an extensive library of titles in a variety of genres, while also dealing with restoration and long-term digital preservation of audiovisual products in partnership with an international network of companies and professionals specializing in the film, audiovisual and multimedia industries.

== Activities ==
The company participates in major film festivals and markets, including MIPTV, MIPCOM and the Cannes Film Festival, EFM European Film Market during the Berlin International Film Festival, DISCOP in Budapest.

At the Cannes Film Festival 2022, it participated by premiering the film "Back to the Present", produced by Variety Distribution and Amazing film srl.

== Catalog ==
The company exclusively distributes worldwide a library of more than a thousand films, most owned by Euro Immobilfin Srl, produced from the 1930s to the present day. Their most famous (owned) movies are those produced and distributed by Penta Film.

Within the catalog are directors including Mario Bava, Alessandro Blasetti, Mario Monicelli, Giuliano Montaldo, Ermanno Olmi, and famous actors including Gino Cervi, Christian De Sica, Aldo Fabrizi, Vittorio Gassman, Gina Lollobrigida, Marcello Mastroianni, Alberto Sordi, Ugo Tognazzi, and Toto.

In 2022, the company acquired the rights to distribute worldwide the film Anthropophagus 2, a film inspired by Joe d'Amato's 1980 cult film Anthropophagus.
