= A hundred Italian films to be saved =

List of the hundred best Italian films

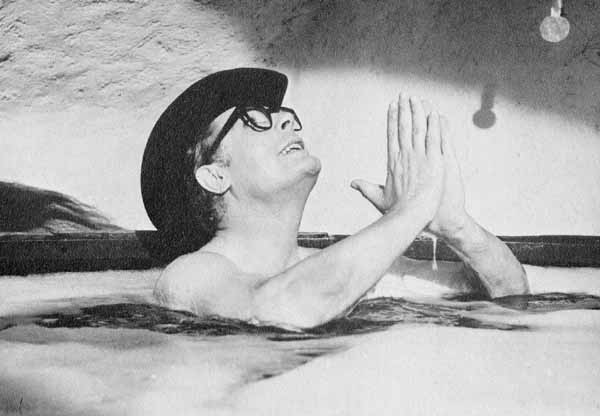
Marcello Mastroianni in 8½ (1963) by Federico Fellini, considered to be one of the greatest films of all time

The list of A hundred Italian films to be saved (Italian: Cento film italiani da salvare) was created with the aim to report "100 films that have changed the collective memory of the country between 1942 and 1978". Film preservation, or film restoration, describes a series of ongoing efforts among film historians, archivists, museums, cinematheques, and nonprofit organization to rescue decaying film stock and preserve the images they contain. In the widest sense, preservation assures that a movie will continue to exist in as close to its original form as possible.

== History ==
The project was established in 2008 by the Venice Days festival section of the 65th Venice International Film Festival, in collaboration with Cinecittà Holding and with the support of the Italian Ministry of Cultural Heritage.

The list was edited by Fabio Ferzetti, film critic of the newspaper Il Messaggero, in collaboration with film director Gianni Amelio and the writers and film critics Gian Piero Brunetta, Giovanni De Luna, Gianluca Farinelli, Giovanna Grignaffini, Paolo Mereghetti, Morando Morandini, Domenico Starnone and Sergio Toffetti.

At the end of the list are added the documentaries by Vittorio De Seta shot between 1954 and 1959.

== The films ==
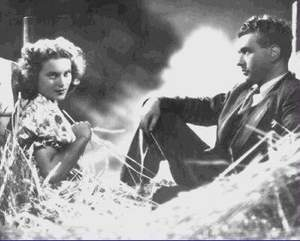
Four Steps in the Clouds (1942) by Alessandro Blasetti

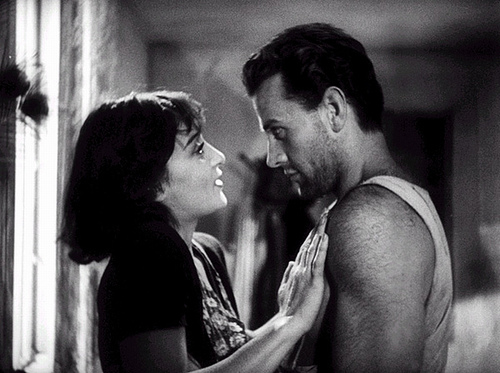
Ossessione (1943) by Luchino Visconti

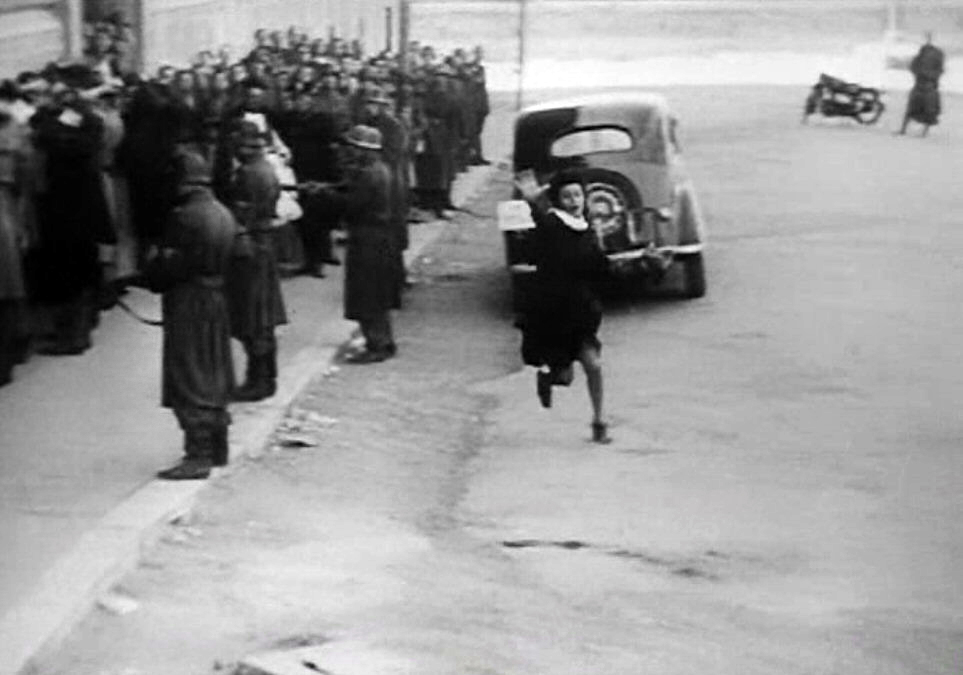
Rome, Open City (1945) by Roberto Rossellini

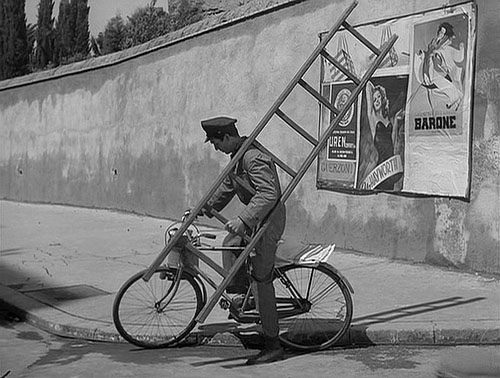
Bicycle Thieves (1948) by Vittorio De Sica

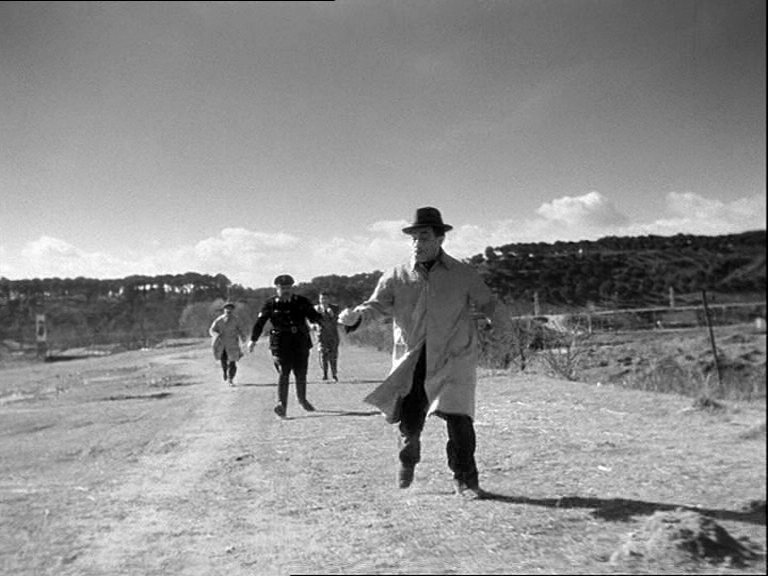
Cops and Robbers (1951) by Steno and Mario Monicelli

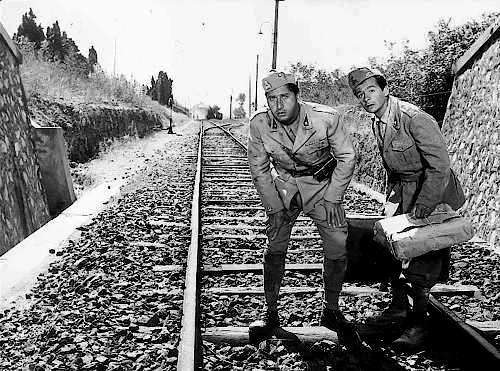
Everybody Go Home (1960) by Luigi Comencini

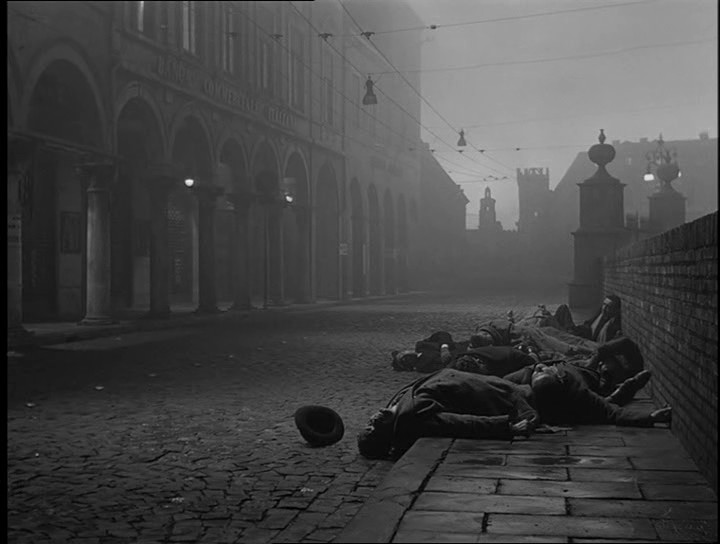
Long Night in 1943 (1960) by Florestano Vancini

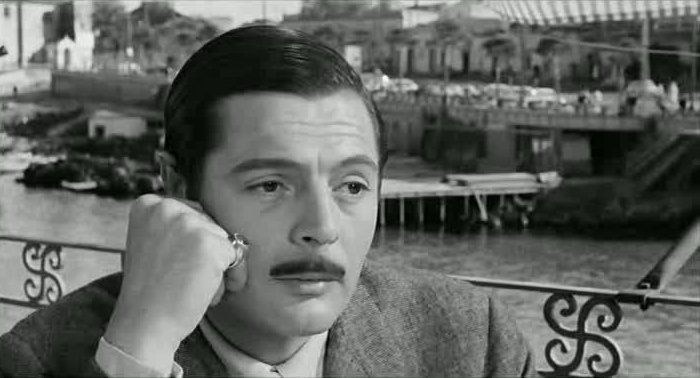
Divorce Italian Style (1961) by Pietro Germi

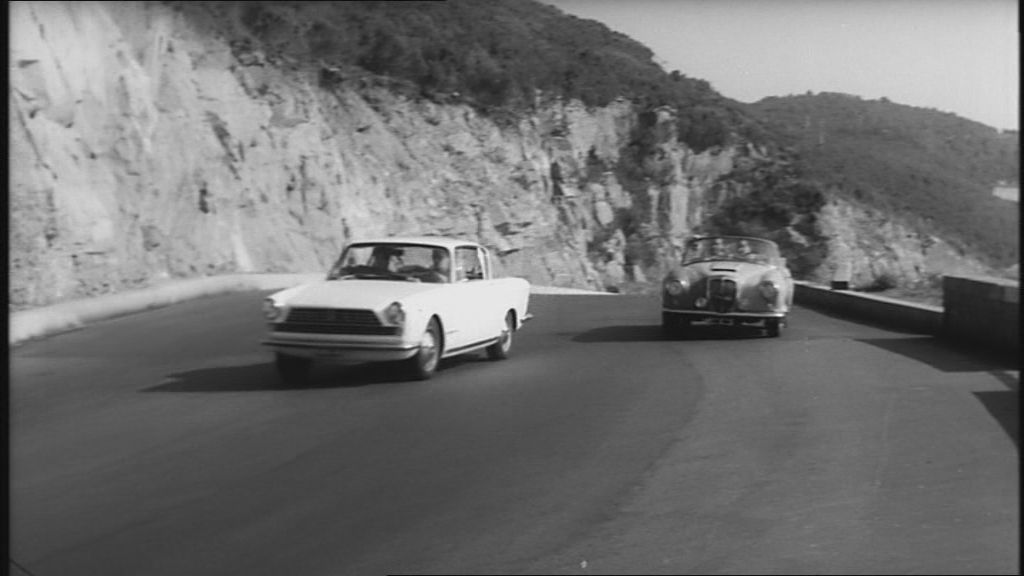
Il sorpasso (1962) by Dino Risi

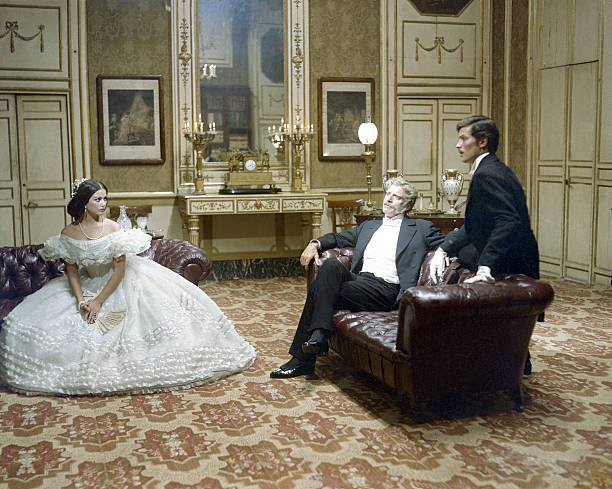
The Leopard (1963) by Luchino Visconti

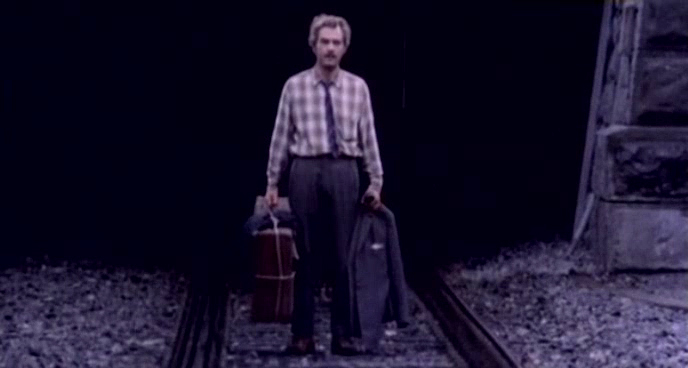
Bread and Chocolate (1974) by Franco Brusati

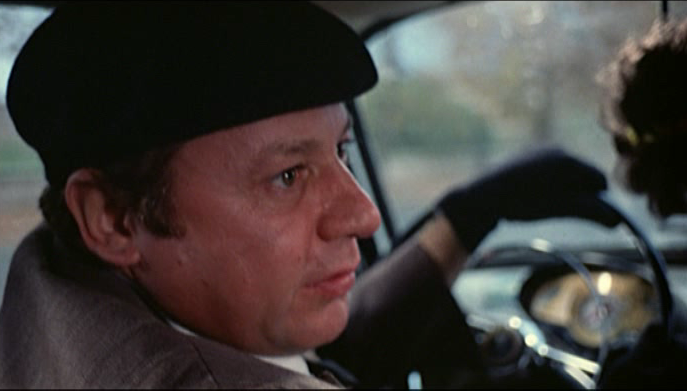
Fantozzi (1975) by Luciano Salce

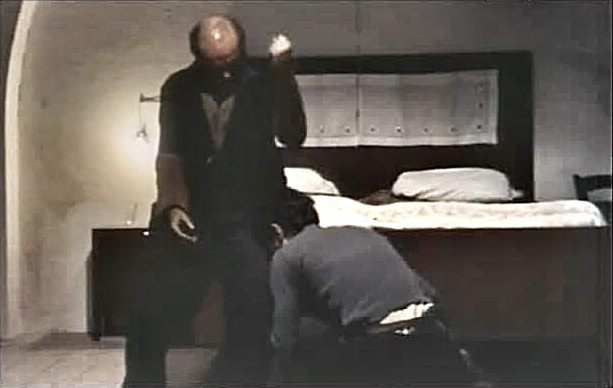
Padre Padrone (1977) by Paolo and Vittorio Taviani

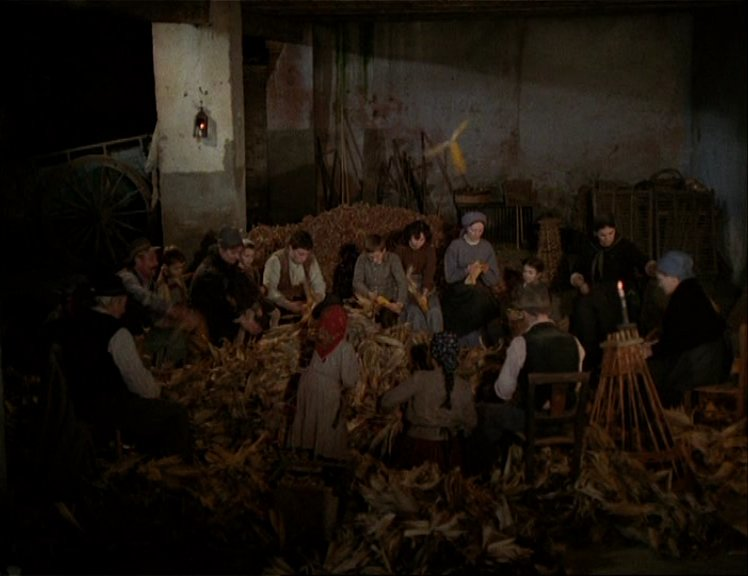
The Tree of Wooden Clogs (1978) by Ermanno Olmi

In chronological order:

| Year | English title | Original title | Director |
|---|---|---|---|
| 1942 | Four Steps in the Clouds | Quattro passi fra le nuvole | Alessandro Blasetti |
| 1943 | Obsession | Ossessione | Luchino Visconti |
| 1945 | Rome, Open City | Roma città aperta | Roberto Rossellini |
| 1946 | Paisan | Paisà | Roberto Rossellini |
| 1946 | Shoeshine | Sciuscià | Vittorio De Sica |
| 1947 | Angelina | L'onorevole Angelina | Luigi Zampa |
| 1948 | Bicycle Thieves | Ladri di biciclette | Vittorio De Sica |
| 1948 | The Earth Trembles | La Terra Trema | Luchino Visconti |
| 1949 | Bitter Rice | Riso amaro | Giuseppe De Santis |
| 1949 | City of Pain | La città dolente | Mario Bonnard |
| 1949 | Heaven over the Marshes | Cielo sulla palude | Augusto Genina |
| 1949 | Stromboli | Stromboli, terra di Dio | Roberto Rossellini |
| 1949 | Chains | Catene | Raffaello Matarazzo |
| 1950 | Path of Hope | Il cammino della speranza | Pietro Germi |
| 1950 | Sunday in August | Domenica d'agosto | Luciano Emmer |
| 1950 | Story of a Love Affair | Cronaca di un amore | Michelangelo Antonioni |
| 1950 | Variety Lights | Luci del varietà | Alberto Lattuada; Federico Fellini |
| 1950 | Father's Dilemma | Prima comunione | Alessandro Blasetti |
| 1951 | —N/a | Bellissima | Luchino Visconti |
| 1951 | Two Cents Worth of Hope | Due soldi di speranza | Renato Castellani |
| 1951 | Cops and Robbers | Guardie e ladri | Steno; Mario Monicelli |
| 1951 | Miracle in Milan | Miracolo a Milano | Vittorio De Sica |
| 1951 | The Passaguai Family | La famiglia Passaguai | Aldo Fabrizi |
| 1952 | —N/a | Umberto D. | Vittorio De Sica |
| 1952 | Europe '51 | Europa '51 | Roberto Rossellini |
| 1952 | The White Sheik | Lo sceicco bianco | Federico Fellini |
| 1952 | Toto in Color | Totò a colori | Steno |
| 1952 | Little World of Don Camillo | Don Camillo | Julien Duvivier |
| 1953 | Bread, Love and Dreams | Pane, amore e fantasia | Luigi Comencini |
| 1953 | The Bullocks | I vitelloni | Federico Fellini |
| 1953 | Neapolitans in Milan | Napoletani a Milano | Eduardo De Filippo |
| 1953 | Eager to Live | Febbre di vivere | Claudio Gora |
| 1953 | The Wayward Wife | La provinciale | Mario Soldati |
| 1953 | Neapolitan Carousel | Carosello napoletano | Ettore Giannini |
| 1953 | Empty Eyes | Il sole negli occhi | Antonio Pietrangeli |
| 1954 | The Beach | La spiaggia | Alberto Lattuada |
| 1954 | The Gold of Naples | L'oro di Napoli | Vittorio De Sica |
| 1954 | An American in Rome | Un americano a Roma | Steno |
| 1954 | The Art of Getting Along | L'arte di arrangiarsi | Luigi Zampa |
| 1954 | —N/a | Senso | Luchino Visconti |
| 1954 | The Road | La strada | Federico Fellini |
| 1954 | A Free Woman | Una donna libera | Vittorio Cottafavi |
| 1955 | Abandoned | Gli sbandati | Francesco Maselli |
| 1955 | A Hero of Our Times | Un eroe dei nostri tempi | Mario Monicelli |
| 1956 | Poor, But Handsome | Poveri ma belli | Dino Risi |
| 1957 | The Cry | Il grido | Michelangelo Antonioni |
| 1957 | Nights of Cabiria | Le notti di Cabiria | Federico Fellini |
| 1958 | Big Deal on Madonna Street | I soliti ignoti | Mario Monicelli |
| 1959 | You're on Your Own | Arrangiatevi! | Mauro Bolognini |
| 1959 | The Great War | La grande guerra | Mario Monicelli |
| 1959 | The Magliari | I magliari | Francesco Rosi |
| 1960 | Everybody Go Home | Tutti a casa | Luigi Comencini |
| 1960 | The Good Life | La dolce vita | Federico Fellini |
| 1960 | Rocco and His Brothers | Rocco e i suoi fratelli | Luchino Visconti |
| 1960 | Girl with a Suitcase | La ragazza con la valigia | Valerio Zurlini |
| 1960 | Long Night in 1943 | La lunga notte del '43 | Florestano Vancini |
| 1960 | —N/a | Il bell'Antonio | Mauro Bolognini |
| 1961 | A Difficult Life | Una vita difficile | Dino Risi |
| 1961 | Divorce Italian Style | Divorzio all'italiana | Pietro Germi |
| 1961 | The Job | Il posto | Ermanno Olmi |
| 1961 | Vagabond | Accattone | Pier Paolo Pasolini |
| 1961 | —N/a | Leoni al sole | Vittorio Caprioli |
| 1962 | The Easy Life | Il sorpasso | Dino Risi |
| 1962 | —N/a | Salvatore Giuliano | Francesco Rosi |
| 1962 | The Eclipse | L'eclisse | Michelangelo Antonioni |
| 1962 | —N/a | Mafioso | Alberto Lattuada |
| 1963 | 15 from Rome | I mostri | Dino Risi |
| 1963 | Hands over the City | Le mani sulla città | Francesco Rosi |
| 1963 | 8½ | Otto e mezzo | Federico Fellini |
| 1963 | The Leopard | Il Gattopardo | Luchino Visconti |
| 1963 | The Ape Woman | La donna scimmia | Marco Ferreri |
| 1963 | Who Works Is Lost | Chi lavora è perduto | Tinto Brass |
| 1964 | It's a Hard Life | La vita agra | Carlo Lizzani |
| 1965 | Fists in the Pocket | I pugni in tasca | Marco Bellocchio |
| 1965 | I Knew Her Well | Io la conoscevo bene | Antonio Pietrangeli |
| 1965 | Love Meetings | Comizi d'amore | Pier Paolo Pasolini |
| 1966 | The Birds, the Bees and the Italians | Signore & signori | Pietro Germi |
| 1966 | The Hawks and the Sparrows | Uccellacci e uccellini | Pier Paolo Pasolini |
| 1966 | The Battle of Algiers | La battaglia di Algeri | Gillo Pontecorvo |
| 1967 | China Is Near | La Cina è vicina | Marco Bellocchio |
| 1968 | Dillinger Is Dead | Dillinger è morto | Marco Ferreri |
| 1968 | Bandits in Milan | Banditi a Milano | Carlo Lizzani |
| 1968 | Be Sick... It's Free | Il medico della mutua | Luigi Zampa |
| 1970 | Investigation of a Citizen Above Suspicion | Indagine su un cittadino al di sopra di ogni sospetto | Elio Petri |
| 1970 | The Conformist | Il conformista | Bernardo Bertolucci |
| 1971 | The Audience | L'udienza | Marco Ferreri |
| 1972 | Diary of a Teacher | Diario di un maestro | Vittorio De Seta |
| 1972 | The Mattei Affair | Il caso Mattei | Francesco Rosi |
| 1972 | The Scientific Cardplayer | Lo scopone scientifico | Luigi Comencini |
| 1972 | In the Name of the Father | Nel nome del padre | Marco Bellocchio |
| 1974 | —N/a | Amarcord | Federico Fellini |
| 1974 | We All Loved Each Other So Much | C'eravamo tanto amati | Ettore Scola |
| 1974 | Bread and Chocolate | Pane e cioccolata | Franco Brusati |
| 1975 | —N/a | Fantozzi | Luciano Salce |
| 1976 | 1900 | Novecento | Bernardo Bertolucci |
| 1976 | Illustrious Corpses | Cadaveri eccellenti | Francesco Rosi |
| 1977 | A Special Day | Una giornata particolare | Ettore Scola |
| 1977 | An Average Little Man | Un borghese piccolo piccolo | Mario Monicelli |
| 1977 | —N/a | Padre padrone | Paolo and Vittorio Taviani |
| 1978 | The Tree of Wooden Clogs | L'albero degli zoccoli | Ermanno Olmi |

== List of directors present ==
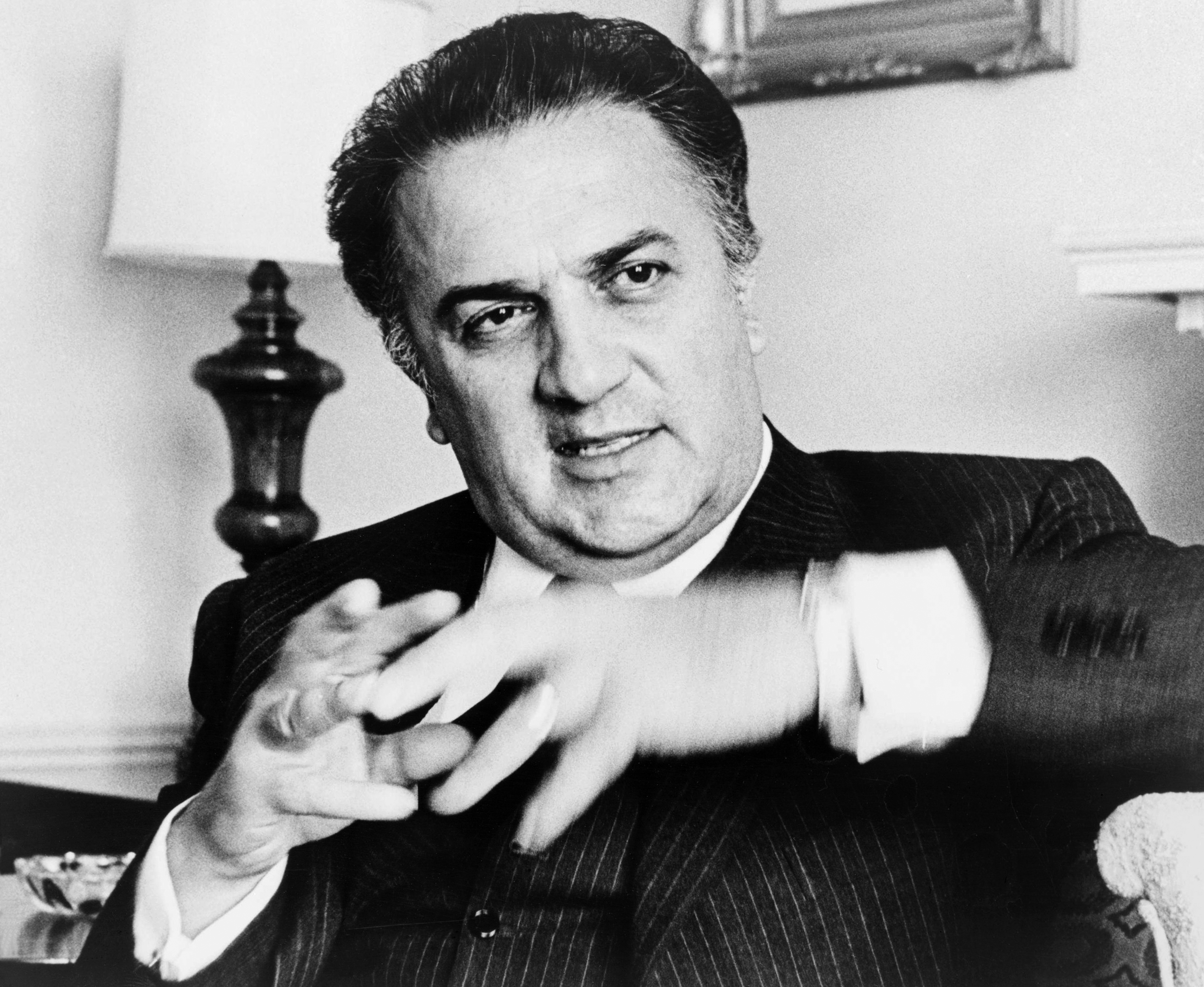
Federico Fellini became known for his extravagant style and influenced many major directors.

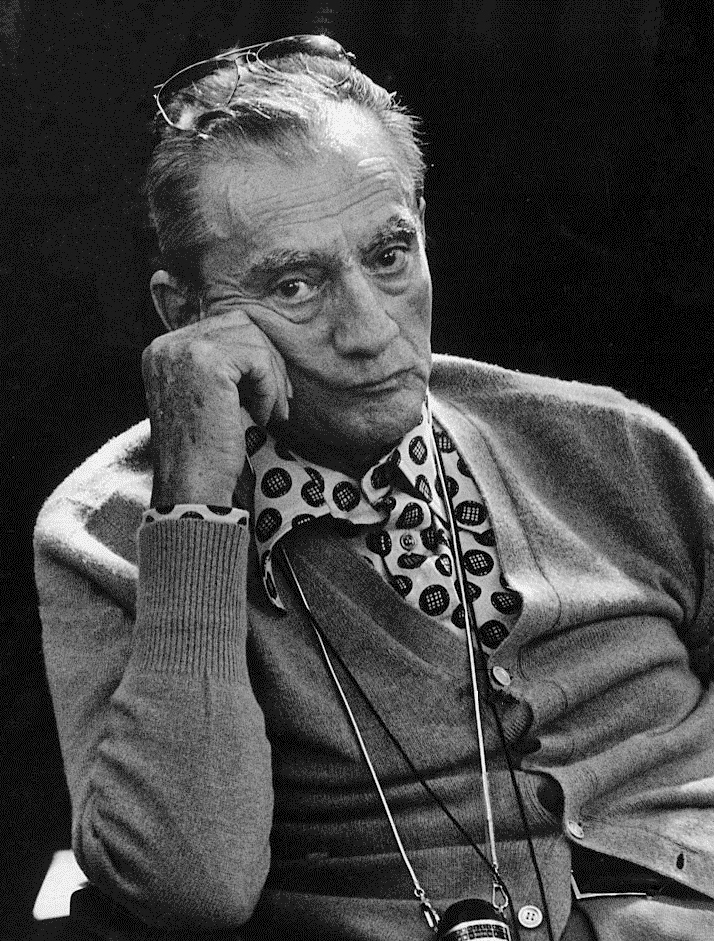
Luchino Visconti. Many of his works are regarded as highly influential to future generations of filmmakers.

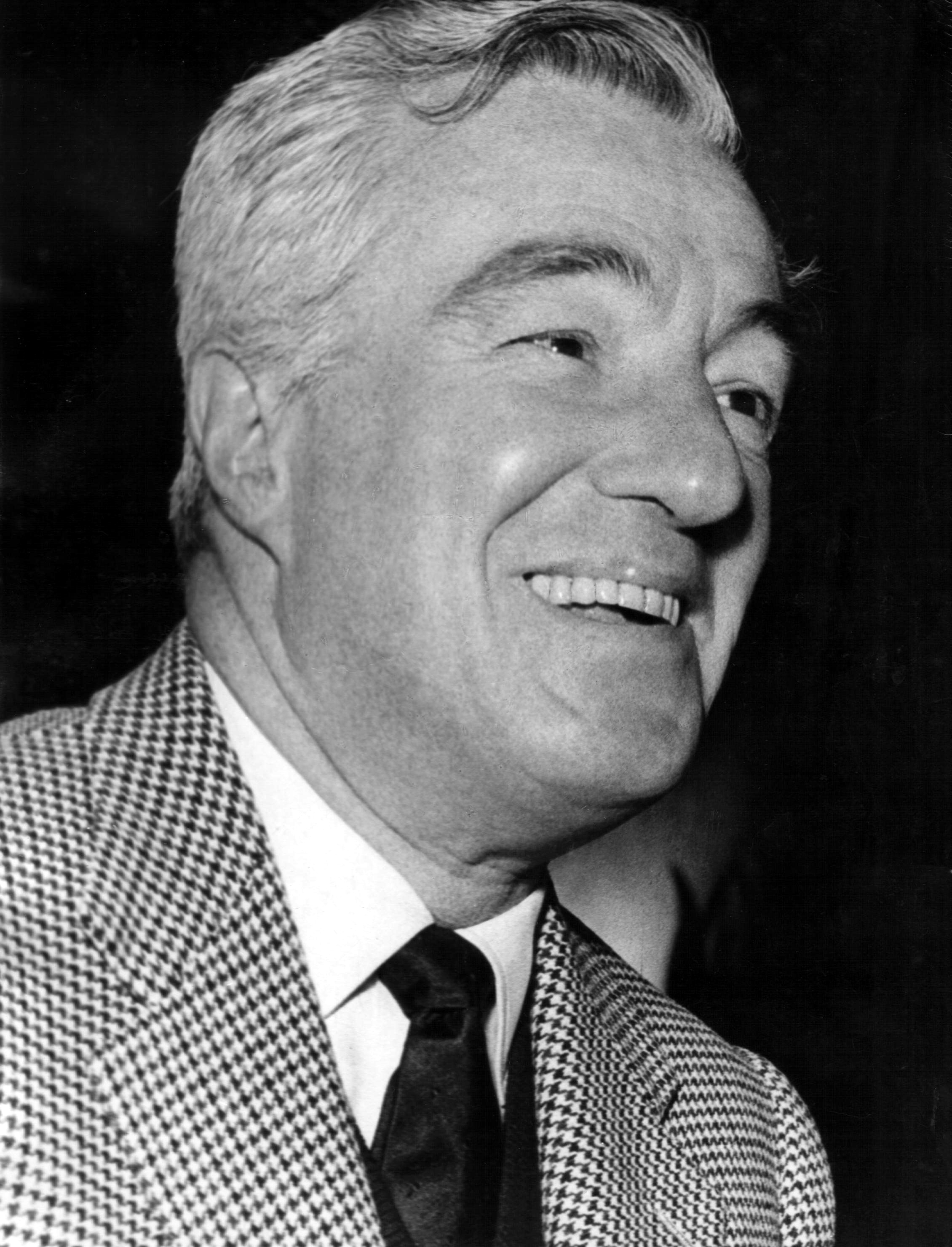
Vittorio De Sica, one of the world's most acclaimed and influential filmmakers of all time

The directors whose films have been selected are listed.

| No. of films | Director | Films |
|---|---|---|
| 8 | Federico Fellini | Variety Lights, The White Sheik, I Vitelloni, La Strada, Nights of Cabiria, La Dolce Vita, 8½, Amarcord |
| 6 | Luchino Visconti | Ossessione, La Terra Trema, Bellissima, Senso, Rocco and His Brothers, The Leopard |
| 5 | Vittorio De Sica | Shoeshine, Bicycle Thieves, Miracle in Milan, Umberto D., The Gold of Naples |
| 5 | Francesco Rosi | The Magliari, Salvatore Giuliano, Hands over the City, The Mattei Affair, Illustrious Corpses |
| 5 | Mario Monicelli | Cops and Robbers, A Hero of Our Times, Big Deal on Madonna Street, The Great War, An Average Little Man |
| 4 | Roberto Rossellini | Rome, Open City; Paisan; Stromboli; Europe '51 |
| 4 | Dino Risi | Poor, But Handsome, A Difficult Life, Il Sorpasso, I mostri |
| 3 | Luigi Zampa | Angelina, The Art of Getting Along, Be Sick... It's Free |
| 3 | Michelangelo Antonioni | Story of a Love Affair, Il Grido, L'Eclisse |
| 3 | Pietro Germi | Path of Hope, Divorce Italian Style, The Birds, the Bees and the Italians |
| 3 | Luigi Comencini | Bread, Love and Dreams, Everybody Go Home, The Scientific Cardplayer |
| 3 | Pier Paolo Pasolini | Accattone, Love Meetings, The Hawks and the Sparrows |
| 3 | Marco Ferreri | The Ape Woman, Dillinger Is Dead, The Audience |
| 3 | Marco Bellocchio | Fists in the Pocket, China Is Near, Nel nome del padre |
| 3 | Alberto Lattuada | Variety Lights, The Beach, Mafioso |
| 3 | Steno | Cops and Robbers, Toto in Color, An American in Rome |
| 2 | Alessandro Blasetti | Four Steps in the Clouds, Father's Dilemma |
| 2 | Antonio Pietrangeli | Empty Eyes, I Knew Her Well |
| 2 | Mauro Bolognini | You're on Your Own, Il bell'Antonio |
| 2 | Ermanno Olmi | Il Posto, The Tree of Wooden Clogs |
| 2 | Carlo Lizzani | La vita agra, Bandits in Milan |
| 2 | Bernardo Bertolucci | The Conformist, 1900 |
| 2 | Ettore Scola | We All Loved Each Other So Much, A Special Day |
| 1 | Mario Bonnard | City of Pain |
| 1 | Giuseppe De Santis | Bitter Rice |
| 1 | Augusto Genina | Heaven over the Marshes |
| 1 | Raffaello Matarazzo | Chains |
| 1 | Luciano Emmer | Sunday in August |
| 1 | Aldo Fabrizi | The Passaguai Family |
| 1 | Julien Duvivier | Little World of Don Camillo |
| 1 | Renato Castellani | Two Cents Worth of Hope |
| 1 | Mario Soldati | The Wayward Wife |
| 1 | Claudio Gora | Eager to Live |
| 1 | Eduardo De Filippo | Neapolitans in Milan |
| 1 | Ettore Giannini | Neapolitan Carousel |
| 1 | Vittorio Cottafavi | A Free Woman |
| 1 | Francesco Maselli | Abandoned |
| 1 | Florestano Vancini | Long Night in 1943 |
| 1 | Valerio Zurlini | Girl with a Suitcase |
| 1 | Vittorio Caprioli | Leoni al sole |
| 1 | Tinto Brass | Chi lavora è perduto |
| 1 | Gillo Pontecorvo | The Battle of Algiers |
| 1 | Elio Petri | Investigation of a Citizen Above Suspicion |
| 1 | Vittorio De Seta | Diario di un maestro |
| 1 | Franco Brusati | Bread and Chocolate |
| 1 | Luciano Salce | Fantozzi |
| 1 | Paolo and Vittorio Taviani | Padre Padrone |

== See also ==
- Cinema of Italy
