= Giulio Calì =

Italian actor (1895–1967)

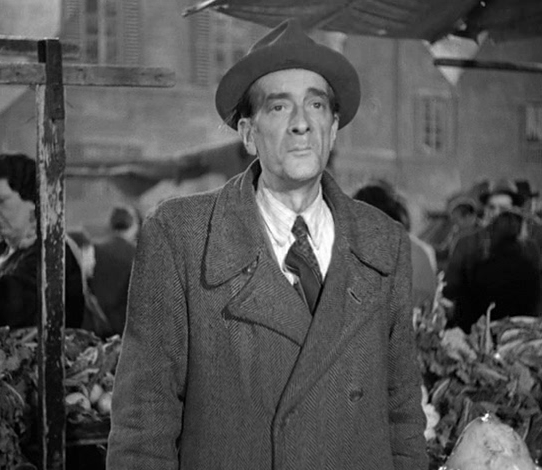
- Giulio Calì in the movie The Peddler and the Lady (1943)
- Born: 26 March 1895; Rome, Kingdom of Italy
- Died: 20 January 1967 (aged 71); Rome, Italy
- Occupation: Actor
- Years active: 1941–1966

Giulio Calì (26 March 1895 – 20 January 1967) was an Italian film actor. He appeared in more than 60 films between 1927 and 1966.

== Life and career ==
Born in Rome, Calì started his career on stage, being mainly active in Romanesco dialect theater and in avanspettacolo. He made his film debut in 1927, in Umberto Paradisi's Un balilla del '48, but his career ultimately started after the Second World War, when he was cast in a good number of films of different genres and quality, even if usually playing very minor roles. Calì is probably best known for his association with director Alberto Lattuada, who gave him his first significant roles, namely Smarazzacucco in The Mill on the Po (1949) and the sailor in The Overcoat (1952). Other notable directors with whom Calì worked include Steno, Mario Monicelli, Alessandro Blasetti, Mario Mattoli, Luigi Zampa and Luigi Comencini.

== Selected filmography ==
- Schoolgirl Diary (1941) – Un poveraccio (uncredited)
- Before the Postman (1942) – Un passegero (uncredited)
- The Peddler and the Lady (1943) – L'uomo che chiede le alicette (uncredited)
- The Gates of Heaven (1945) – Il napoletano curioso (uncredited)
- The White Primrose (1947) – Barista
- The Mill on the Po (1949) – Smarazzacucco
- Le due madonne (1949)
- Figaro Here, Figaro There (1950)
- Variety Lights (1950) - Magician Edison Will
- Mater dei (1950)
- Cops and Robbers (1951) - The Beggar (uncredited)
- The Passaguai Family Gets Rich (1952) - The Junk Shop Owner
- The Overcoat (1952) - Il sarto
- Five Paupers in an Automobile (1952) - Lo stalliere
- Toto and the King of Rome (1952) - Sonatore di Tromba (uncredited)
- Prisoner in the Tower of Fire (1952) - Giulio
- La trappola di fuoco (1952)
- The Unfaithfuls (1953) - Giulio Cantagalli
- I Chose Love (1953)
- Il viale della speranza (1953) - (uncredited)
- At the Edge of the City (1953) - Calì
- Legione straniera (1953) - Dupont
- One of Those (1953) - (uncredited)
- La valigia dei sogni (1953) - Impiegato della Biblioteca Nazionale
- Musoduro (1953) - Rospo
- A Day in Court (1954) - Augusto Mencacci
- Public Opinion (1954)
- Desiderio 'e sole (1954) - Vitaliano De Bellis
- Nel gorgo del peccato (1954) - Il padrone di casa
- Cuore di mamma (1954) - The Grandfather
- The Pilgrim of Love (1954) - Commissario
- Days of Love (1954) - Pietro Cafalla, nonno di Angela
- An American in Rome (1954) - Padre di Nando
- Tears of Love (1954)
- Lacrime d'amore (1954)
- Too Bad She's Bad (1954) - La guardia notturna
- Due soldi di felicità (1954) - Gigetto
- Ultima illusione (1954)
- Le vacanze del sor Clemente (1955) - Il cameriere della rosticceria
- Toto in Hell (1955) - Caronte
- A Hero of Our Times (1955) - Il giovanottaccio
- The Belle of Rome (1955) - Il cameriere
- Tragic Ballad (1955) - Marinaio genovese
- Motivo in maschera (1955)
- La ragazza di via Veneto (1955)
- My Life Is Yours (1956)
- Una pelliccia di visone (1956) - Jeweler
- Nero's Weekend (1956)
- La capinera del mulino (1956) - il Druso
- Operazione notte (1957)
- The Wolves (1957) - Nazzareno
- The Mysteries of Paris (1957)
- Susanna Whipped Cream (1957) - Un barbone
- The Love Specialist (1957) - The undressed Tramp (uncredited)
- The Lady Doctor (1957) - Un malato di mente (uncredited)
- La canzone più bella (1957)
- La chiamavan Capinera... (1957)
- Gli zitelloni (1958)
- Pia de' Tolomei (1958)
- Gli avventurieri dell'Uranio (1958) - Sten
- Winter Holidays (1959) - Oncle Carlo
- The Defeated Victor (1959) - Gaetano
- La cento chilometri (1959) - The Tall Man Who Sides with Angela
- Nel blu, dipinto di blu (1959) - The Lawyer (uncredited)
- La Dolce Vita (1960) - Mario's Uncle (uncredited)
- Escape by Night (1960) - Driver of the Fake Nuns
- The Traffic Policeman (1960) - The Old Shepherd (uncredited)
- Mobby Jackson (1960)
- Gli incensurati (1961) - La ingaggia ladri
- Scano Boa (1961)
- Nerone '71 (1962) - Francesco
- Colpo gobbo all'italiana (1962) - Costumier
- I tre nemici (1962) - Uomo nel Negozio (uncredited)
- Gladiator of Rome (1962) - Old Christian
- A Girl... and a Million (1962) - The Widower (uncredited)
- 8½ (1963) - Un uomo ai fanghi (uncredited)
- Il ribelle di Castelmonte (1964)
- Eroe vagabondo (1966) - (final film role)
