= Toto in Color =

- Directed by: Steno
- Written by: Steno; Age & Scarpelli; Totò
- Produced by: Giovanni Amati; Dino De Laurentiis; Carlo Ponti
- Starring: Totò
- Cinematography: Tonino Delli Colli
- Edited by: Mario Bonotti
- Music by: Felice Montagnini
- Distributed by: Filmauro Home Video
- Release date: 1952
- Running time: 95 min
- Country: Italy
- Language: Italian

Toto in Color (Italian: Totò a colori) is a 1952 Italian comedy film, the first Italian color film shot with the Ferraniacolor system. It was directed by Steno and starred the comic actor Totò. In 2008, the film was included on the Italian Ministry of Cultural Heritage’s 100 Italian films to be saved, a list of 100 films that "have changed the collective memory of the country between 1942 and 1978."

== Plot ==
Antonio Scannagatti is a penniless musician who lives with his sister's family in the small town of Caianello. He dreams of a call from either of the famed Milanese music publishers Tiscordi or Zozzogno (puns of the real Ricordi and Sonzogno) to launch him to musical stardom. Scannagatti is convinced he is a musical genius, calling himself "the Swan of Caianello".

The mayor of Caianello is organizing a celebration for the Italian-American gangster Joe Pellecchia, originally from the town, and asks Scannagatti to direct the town’s musical band in place of maestro Tiburzio, who has suffered a sudden paralysis of the arms. Feeling outraged by a proposal he deems unworthy of his perceived talent, Scannagatti then enthusiastically accepts when the mayor’s nephew Poldo falsely promises him a recommendation from the publisher Tiscordi, passing off his American girlfriend Poppy as Tiscordi’s secretary.

The day of celebration turns out to be a failure: Pellecchia is frustrated in his attempts to give a speech from the balcony of the town hall as Scannagatti inadvertently prevents him by making the band play his works continuously, until the Italian-American leaves enraged. A day later Scannagatti attempts to collect his reward – the coveted recommendation – and joins Poldo and Poppy, who have left Caianello and are guests at a bizarre house party held by a rich heiress in Capri. There, the couple tricks him again by making him believe he has received an appointment with Tiscordi.

Scannagatti therefore takes a sleeping car train to Milan. After a night trip spent arguing with his bunk mate, the politician the Honourable Cosimo Trombetta, he finally arrives in Milan and meets Tiscordi in person due to a misunderstanding: he has been mistaken for a nurse able to give painless back injections to the editor, who has already fired numerous nurses. The misunderstanding leads to an altercation between the two.

Further complications arise when Scannagatti is intercepted by his Sicilian brother-in-law – whose money he has stolen for the trip to Milan – who threatens to kill him; to appease him, the maestro pretends to have obtained a contract and takes him to a musical performance, but of a teatro dei pupi. Scannagatti is chased by his murderous brother-in-law but manages to deceive him by pretending to be a Pinocchio puppet and dancing to the tune of Parade of the Wooden Soldiers, but at the end of the show his brother-in-law recognizes him and chases him once again with a knife. By chance Tiscordi reads one of the scores left in his office by Scannagatti and is delighted by it, offering him a publishing contract and the fame he has always desired: in the end, the whole town of Caianello – his brother-in-law included – pays homage to their "Swan".

== Cast ==
- Totò as Antonio Scannagatti
- Virgilio Riento as Tiburzio
- Mario Castellani as Cosimo Trombetta
- Luigi Pavese as Tiscordi
- Franca Valeri as Giulia Sofia
- Galeazzo Benti as Poldo of Roccarasata
- Isa Barzizza as Lady of the sleeping car
- Rosita Pisano as Antonio's sister
- Rocco D'Assunta as Sicilian brother-in-law
- Carlo Mazzarella as Giulia's fiancée
- Fulvia Franco as Poppy Winnipeg
- Lily Cerasoli as Patrizia
- Anna Vita as Existentialist
- Vittorio Caprioli as Stutterer tenor
- Bruno Corelli as Painter
- Idolo Tancredi as Joe Pellecchia
- Alberto Bonucci as Russian director
- Guglielmo Inglese as Gardener

== Production ==
Totò in Color was essentially an anthology of Totò's most famous comedy sketches and mime performances, such as the dancing Pinocchio puppet who collapses as soon as the music ends and the simulated fireworks during the ending scene. According to Steno, directing the film was basically like leaving the movie camera directly in Totò's hands, whose timing had been perfected by many decades of performing the sketches in front of the public.

The movie was shot with the Ferraniacolor system, which required extremely powerful lighting; this was especially painful for Totò – already suffering from long-term eye problems – and is credited for accelerating his loss of vision.

"The Honourable Gentleman in the sleeping car" (Italian: "L'Onorevole in vagone letto") has been called Totò's most famous sketch. It originated in 1947 and after years of performance it expanded until assuming its final iteration in Totò in Color. It was inspired by a real encounter between Totò and Giulio Andreotti who by chance found themselves sharing the same sleeping car. Film director Walter Veltroni considered it "perhaps the most sensational comedy sketch in the history of Italian cinema".

== Reception ==
Totò in Color is widely regarded as Totò's masterpiece. Film critic Morando Morandini gave the film four stars out of five.

The film has been chosen as one of the 100 Italian films to be saved.
