= O.K. Nerone =

- Directed by: Mario Soldati
- Written by: Lewis E. Ciannelli; Sandro Continenza; Mario Monicelli; Age & Scarpelli; Steno
- Starring: Carlo Campanini; Walter Chiari; Silvana Pampanini
- Music by: Mario Nascimbene
- Release date: 1951
- Country: Italy
- Language: Italian

O.K. Nerone is a 1951 Italian comedy film directed by Mario Soldati.

== Synopsis ==
Two American soldiers with Italian background, Fiorello and Jimmy daydream about visiting Ancient Rome, while sight-seeing in the Italian capital. Soon they find themselves in the time of Emperor Nero, and embark on a series of misadventures.

== Cast ==
- Gino Cervi: Emperor Nero
- Silvana Pampanini: Empress Poppea
- Walter Chiari: Fiorello Capone
- Jackie Frost: Licia
- Carlo Campanini: Jimmy Gargiulo
- Piero Palermini: Marcus
- Giulio Donnini: Tigellinus
- Alda Mangini: Sophonisba, the sorceress
- Alba Arnova: Ballerina
- Rocco D'Assunta: Prefect Pannunzia
- Enzo Fiermonte: Gladiator
- Giacomo Furia: Harbinger
- Rosario Borelli: Tullio
- Mario Siletti: Seneca
- Umberto Sacripante: Clerk
- Pietro Tordi: Gladiator from Gaul
