= Cops and Robbers (1951 film) =

Guardie e ladri
- Italian film poster
- Directed by: Steno; Mario Monicelli
- Written by: Vitaliano Brancati; Ennio Flaiano; Aldo Fabrizi; Mario Monicelli; Ruggero Maccari; Steno
- Produced by: Carlo Ponti; Dino De Laurentiis
- Starring: Totò; Aldo Fabrizi; Ave Ninchi; Rossana Podestà
- Cinematography: Mario Bava
- Edited by: Adriana Novelli
- Music by: Alessandro Cicognini
- Release date: 21 October 1951
- Running time: 109 minutes
- Country: Italy
- Language: Italian

Cops and Robbers (Italian: Guardie e ladri) is a 1951 Italian cult comedy film directed by Steno and Mario Monicelli. It stars the famous comedian Totò, and the cinematographer was the future film director Mario Bava. It was produced by Dino De Laurentiis and Carlo Ponti.

Its style is close to Italian neorealism. Released in Italian cinemas in November 1951 and shown in competition at the Cannes Film Festival in 1952, earned the award for Piero Tellini the script and Totò the Nastro d'Argento. It had trouble with the censor because it portrayed clumsy police and smart thieves, but it was a great success. The film was a huge success and an unexpected liking by critics. Cops and robbers represented a real turning point in the career of Totò, so that for the first time his film had exclusively positive reviews, and its interpretation is considered one of the best of his career.

In 2008, the film was included on the Italian Ministry of Cultural Heritage’s 100 Italian films to be saved, a list of 100 films that "have changed the collective memory of the country between 1942 and 1978." It was shown as part of a retrospective on Italian comedy at the 67th Venice International Film Festival.

== Plot ==
The film is set in Rome during the Marshall Plan. Ferdinando Esposito (Totò) is a small villain who tries to support his family with his tricks. With his accomplice Amilcare (Aldo Giuffrè) pretends to have found an ancient coin in the Roman Forum and an American tourist cheats: Mr. Locuzzo that, unfortunately for him, is the chairman of a committee of the American charity. During the distribution of some gift-packs, also Esposito, these recognize and denounce the spot.

So begins a comical car chase with a fat police officer, Sergeant Lorenzo Buttoni (Aldo Fabrizi). At first unable to capture him, but then cheated by Esposito, if he blurts out. Suspended from duty for the protests of Mr. Locuzzo, the agent Bottoni risk of losing their jobs if they fail to stop the thief within three months. Dressed civilian clothes and hid the incident to his family, goes in search of Esposito. Find his house and so he knows the family, trying to ingraziarsela with favors and offers of food. Esposito, however, no trace. Gradually the two families become friends, and between his brother's wife's "Thief" and the daughter of the "guard" is a sympathy.

Comes the day of the meal during which you know the two families and is taken for granted the presence of Esposito, unaware of his identity. Currently dell'agnizione, which takes place outside the home, Esposito chides him for having taken away the good faith of his family, while Bottoni confides his drama. A sort of human complicity develops between the two. So the roles are reversed and it is the same Esposito who decided to carry him to prison, despite the sergeant he is now reluctant. By hiding the truth to their families, believing instead that they have common concerns, the two leave the room friendly by making them believe that Esposito leaves for a business trip and accompany him to the station buttons. In his absence, will be Bottoni to think about the Esposito family.

== Cast ==
- Totò: Ferdinando Esposito
- Aldo Fabrizi: Lorenzo Bottoni
- Pina Piovani: Donata
- Carlo Delle Piane: Libero Esposito
- Ernesto Almirante: Carlo Esposito
- Gino Leurini: Alfredo
- Ave Ninchi: Giovanna
- Rossana Podestà: Liliana Bottoni
- Paolo Modugno: Paolo Bottoni
- Aldo Giuffrè: Amilcare
- Mario Castellani: taxi driver
- William Tubbs: Mr. Locuzzo
- Pietro Carloni: commissary
- Gino Scotti: deputy commissary
- Armando Guarnieri: barber
- Luciano Bonanni: second barber
- Giulio Calì
- Ciro Berardi
- Carlo Mazzarella
- Aldo Alimonti
- Riccardo Antolini
- Alida Cappellini
- Rocco D'Assunta
- Ettore Jannetti

== Production ==
The subject of Cops and Robbers was born Piero Tellini, which was inspired by an idea had by Federico Fellini. The film was to be directed by Luigi Zampa. The director wanted to allocate the proportion of the guard at Peppino De Filippo and that of his wife Anna Magnani, but had to cancel the movie because some of his old movies had problems with censorship. So the direction was entrusted to Monicelli and Steno. The film was one of the first to be produced by the production house "Ponti-De Laurentiis" and Carlo Ponti had the idea to put together Totò and Aldo Fabrizi. In real life, the two actors were affectionate friends, but had never worked together. Everyone was worried about what might happen putting Toto and Fabrizi together however, everything went very well. Totò was a bit 'hesitant at first, when he was offered the role, because it was very different from the characters he had played before. The shooting of Steno and Monicelli began February 3, 1951, but because of the problems they had with the censorship the film was released towards the end of the year, so Steno and Monicelli had to change some things in the film already shot.

- In more than a chase scene you can see that the 4 actors (Totò, Fabrizi, Castellani and Tubbs), obviously framed from behind, have been replaced by doubles and an example is the scene of the crossing in the mud.
- Aldo Fabrizi and Totò were not able to finish the scene where they are sitting at the inn. The cause was the laughter that the two actors could not hold back during the course of the sequence. In more than one occasion Fabrizi watered the face of Totò with coffee that had just taken, because suddenly burst out laughing.

== Distribution ==
- Italy: Guardie e ladri, November 29, 1951
- France: Gendarmes et Thieves, October 10, 1952 – October 23, 1981 (re-release)
- Portugal: Polícia and Ladrão, November 21, 1952
- Denmark: Betjenten og Tyven, May 11, 1953
- UK: Cops and Robbers, January 29, 1953
- Finland: Ikuisen kaupungin varas, September 24, 1954
- West Germany: Räuber und Gendarm, 1957
- Belgium: Gendarmes et Thieves
- Spain: Guardias y ladrones
- Argentina: Policias y ladrones
- Hungary: Rendőrök és tolvajok
- Poland: Zlodzieje the policjanci
- Egypt
- Uruguay
- Turkey
- Russia
- China: 警察與小偷

== Box office ==
The proceeds of the film was ₤ 653.790.000, became one of the highest-grossing films of Totò.

== Awards ==
- 1952 Cannes Film Festival: Best Screenplay
- Nastro d'Argento: Best Actor (Totò)

== Citations ==
- The sequence in which Fabrizi, at the end of the chase, Totò recommends a cure for the liver, was later explicitly mentioned in the movie For Love and Gold (1966), by Mario Monicelli.
- The scene in which Totò fishing from a grocery store was already used in his first film Fermo con le mani (1937), where fishing from the fishmonger's counter.
- The scene of the inn is reminiscent of Toto and Carolina (1955), by Mario Monicelli.

== Remake ==
In 1997 Russian cinema has made a remake of the film.
