= Alberto Bonucci =

Italian actor (1918–1969)

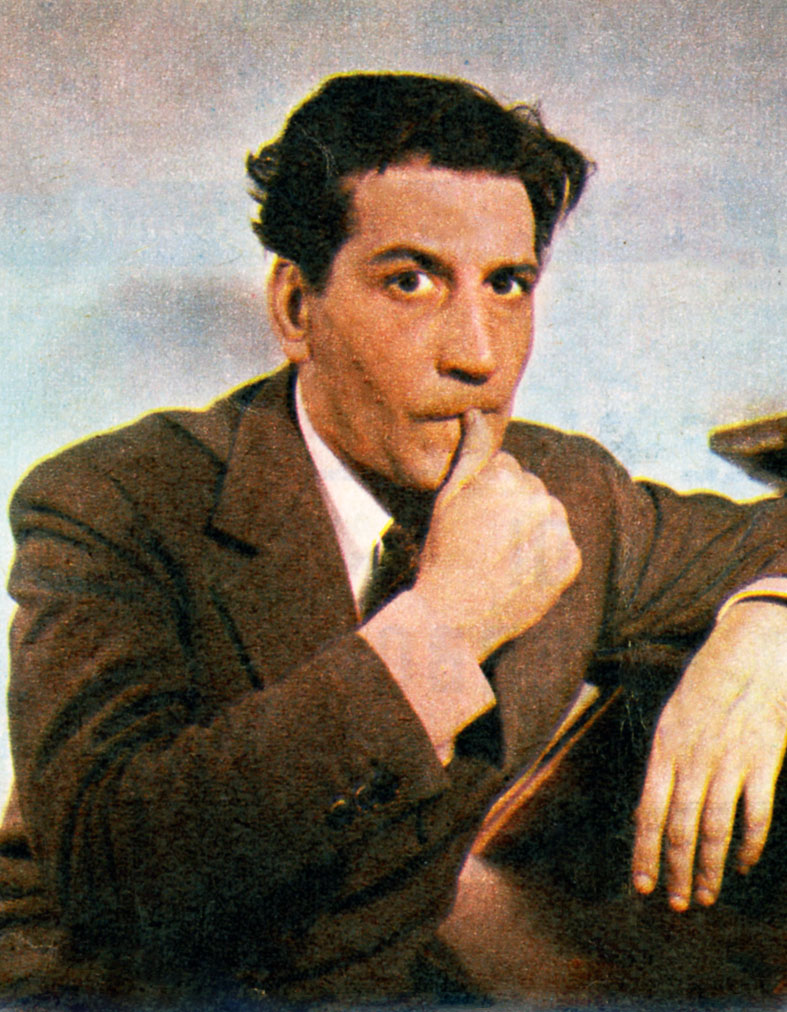
- Bonucci in 1957
- Born: 19 May 1918; Campobasso, Kingdom of Italy
- Died: 5 April 1969 (aged 50); Rome, Italy
- Occupations: Actor; Film director
- Years active: 1950–1967

Alberto Bonucci (Italian pronunciation: [alˈbɛrto boˈnuttʃi]; 19 May 1918 – 5 April 1969) was an Italian film actor and director. He appeared in 53 films between 1950 and 1967.

== Partial filmography ==
- Variety Lights (1950) - Night Club Comic
- Fugitive in Trieste (1951)
- Toto in Color (1952) - Il regista russo
- It Happened in the Park (1953) - Il presentatore del concorso di bellezza (segment: Concorso di bellezza)
- Neapolitan Carousel (1954) - Lyricist #1
- The Contessa's Secret (1954) - Castiglione
- La moglie è uguale per tutti (1955) - Leopoldo Rossi
- Les Hussards (1955) - Raphaël
- The Best Part (1955) - Antoine
- Lo svitato (1956) - Un vigile urbano
- Susanna tutta panna (1957) - Massimo
- Femmine tre volte (1957) - Santucci
- Ladro lui, ladra lei (1958) - Dottor Valletti
- Promesse di marinaio (1958) - Giulio
- Il terrore dell'Oklahoma (1959) - Benny
- Roulotte e roulette (1959) - Alberto
- Il Mattatore (1960) - Gloria Patri
- Le signore (1960) - (uncredited)
- Blood and Roses (1960) - Carlo Ruggieri
- Un mandarino per Teo (1960) - Il notaio
- Gli incensurati (1961) - Il regista
- The Last Judgment (1961) - Guest of Matteoni
- Scandali al mare (1961) - Dante
- Le magnifiche 7 (1961) - Il professor Valdo
- Walter e i suoi cugini (1961) - Sisini
- Pugni, pupe e marinai (1961) - Dott. Milanò
- I tromboni di Fra Diavolo (1962) - Tenente Bergere
- I motorizzati (1962)
- Twist, lolite e vitelloni (1962) - Giovanni
- La donna degli altri è sempre più bella (1963) - The Acting Teacher (segment "I Promessi Sposi")
- Obiettivo ragazze (1963) - Il sottufficiale della ronda (uncredited)
- Le monachine (1963) - Mr. Batistucchi
- The Swindlers (1963) - President of Roma Football Club (segment "Società calcistica, La")
- Siamo tutti pomicioni (1963) - The Sicilian Husband with cigarette (segment "Pomicioni di provincia")
- The Four Musketeers (1963) - Cyrano de Bergerac
- Love in Four Dimensions (1964) - Pallotta, il produttore (segment "Amore e arte")
- Cleopazza (1964)
- Le sette vipere (Il marito latino) (1964) - Lawyer of Lorenzo
- Oltraggio al pudore (1964)
- Sedotti e bidonati (1964) - Arturo
- A Monster and a Half (1964) - Prof. Carogni
- Letti sbagliati (1965) - Lo zio de Enrichetta (segment "Quel porco di Maurizio")
- I figli del leopardo (1965) - Babalone
- Seven Golden Men (1965) - Radio Ham
- La vedovella (1965) - Assessore Caputo
- Questo pazzo, pazzo mondo della canzone (1965)
- Mondo pazzo... gente matta! (1966) - Anchise Spadoni
- Seven Golden Men Strike Again (1966) - Radio Ham (uncredited)
- The Mona Lisa Has Been Stolen (1966) - L'illusioniste
- 7 monaci d'oro (1966) - Podista
- The Taming of the Shrew (1967) - Nathaniel
- Crónica de nueve meses (1967) - Enrique
