= Lia Amanda =

Italian former film actress

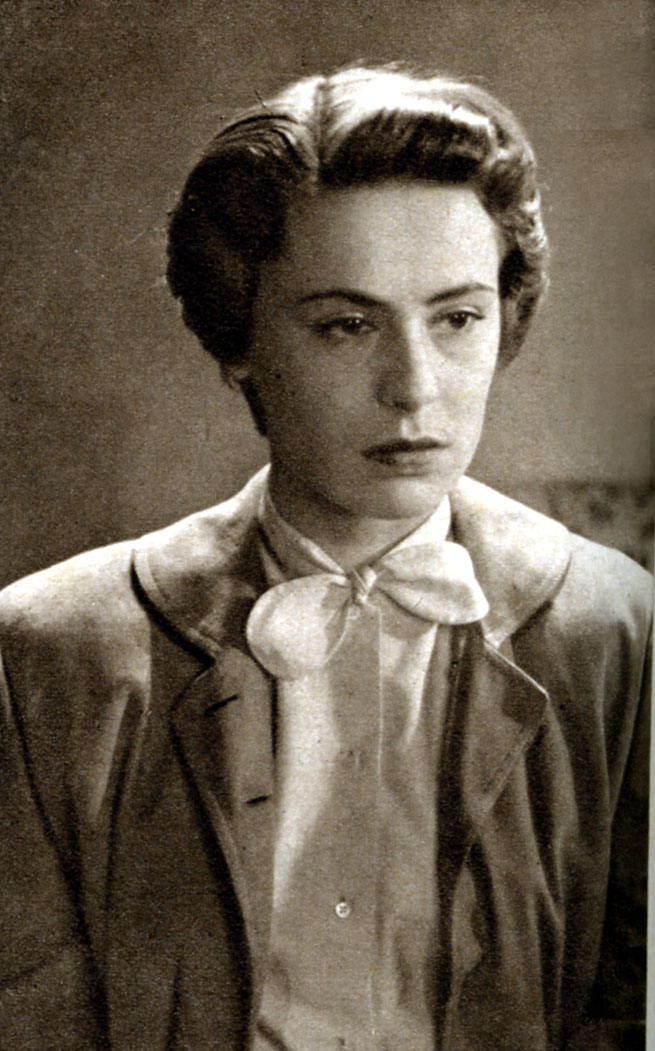
- Born: Lia Molfesi; 2 September 1932 (age 93); Rome, Kingdom of Italy
- Occupation: Actress

Lia Amanda (born 2 September 1932) is an Italian former film actress.

== Life and career ==
Born in Rome as Lia Molfesi, Amanda was the daughter of the character actor Mario Molfesi.

She debuted at very young age with her real name in Mario Monicelli and Steno's Totò cerca casa, in which she played the daughter of Totò. She adopted her stage name since her second film, Cento piccole mamme, in which she also had her first leading role.

After several significant roles in critically appreciated films including Augusto Genina's Tre storie proibite, at the peak of her career, at the 1955 Punta del Este Film Festival Amanda announced her retirement from acting to move in Brazil with her husband, the Argentine businessman Arnaldo Carraro. In 1975 she made a fleeting return to acting with a supporting role in the giallo Nude per l'assassino.

== Selected filmography ==
- Toto Looks for a House (1949)
- One Hundred Little Mothers (1952)
- Past Lovers (1953)
- Alarm in Morocco (1953)
- The Count of Monte Cristo (1954)

== See also ==
- List of Italian actresses
