= Mater dei (1950 film) =

- Directed by: Emilio Cordero
- Release date: 1950
- Running time: 90 minutes
- Country: Italy
- Language: Italian

Mater dei is a 1950 Italian drama film directed by Emilio Cordero.

It is the first Italian film shot in color.

== Cast ==
- Giorgio Costantini
- Myriam De Mayo
- Anna Maria Alegiani
- Bianca Doria
- Giulio Calì
- Orlando Baralla
- Viva Bertoncello
- Ida Bracci Dorati
- Rita Galgano
- Enzo Hassan
- Elfriede Jera
- Mario Lodolini
- Ileana Simova ... Virgin Mary
- Michel Sorel
