= Toto Looks for a House =

1950 Italian comedy film

- Film poster
- Directed by: Mario Monicelli; Steno
- Written by: Age & Scarpelli; Mario Monicelli; Steno; Vittorio Metz
- Produced by: Antonio Mambretti
- Starring: Totò
- Cinematography: Giuseppe Caracciolo
- Edited by: Renato Cinquini
- Music by: Carlo Rustichelli; Amedeo Escobar
- Release date: 1949
- Running time: 76 minutes
- Country: Italy
- Language: Italian

Toto Looks for a House (Italian: Totò cerca casa) is a 1949 Italian comedy film directed by Mario Monicelli and Steno. The film is stylistically related to Italian neorealism, though it can be seen as a parody. It was a commercial success, being the second most popular film at the box office that year.

== Plot ==
In a post-war period Italy, the problem for every citizen is to find a comfortable place to live. Beniamino Lomacchio (Totò) is one of the many people without a home and, together with his family, he has been living in a school. He cannot live there much longer, though, because school re-opens in September. Beniamino is a poor clerk and does not know what to do; he just hopes he'll find a comfortable apartment with a landlord who doesn't ask for too much rent.

One day, however, Beniamino finds a place to move into: a cemetery caretaker's house. Not all the family is convinced it's a great idea. They stay there for a short while, fleeing when they think they see a ghost. After leaving the house, Beniamino finds another job at the studio of an artist. But even here the family Lomacchio will not agree with Beniamino. They then find a large apartment. But they've been cheated; the apartment has already been rented out to another family. Eventually, even after staying in the Colosseum, Beniamino is in a car accident. He has finally found a home: a psychiatric hospital.

== Cast ==
- Totò as Beniamino Lomacchio
- Alda Mangini as Amalia, la moglie de Lomacchio
- Lia Molfesi as Aida, la figlia
- Mario Gattari as Figlio
- Aroldo Tieri as Checchino, il fidanzato
- Folco Lulli as Turco
- Enzo Biliotti as Il sindaco
- Mario Castellani as Truffatore
- Pietro De Vico as Cinese
- Flavio Forin as Vedovo
- Giacomo Furia as Pasquale Saluto
- Marisa Merlini as Patronessa
- Luigi Pavese as Capo ufficio
- Cesare Polacco as Vice custode
- Alfredo Ragusa as Bidello

== Bibliography ==
- Bondanella, Peter. A History of Italian Cinema. Bloomsbury Publishing, 2009.
