= Eager to Live =

1953 film

- Film poster
- Directed by: Claudio Gora
- Written by: Suso Cecchi d'Amico; Luigi Filippo D'Amico; Claudio Gora; Lamberto Santilli; Leopoldo Trieste
- Produced by: Aldo Pacitto
- Starring: Massimo Serato; Marina Berti; Anna Maria Ferrero
- Cinematography: Enzo Serafin; Oberdan Troiani
- Edited by: Mariano Arditi
- Music by: Valentino Bucchi
- Production company: Pac Film
- Distributed by: Atlantis Film
- Release date: 22 May 1953
- Running time: 110 minutes
- Country: Italy
- Language: Italian

Eager to Live (Italian: Febbre di vivere) is a 1953 Italian drama film directed by Claudio Gora and starring Massimo Serato, Marina Berti and Anna Maria Ferrero. Location shooting took place around Rome. The film's sets were designed by the art director Saverio D'Eugenio. In 2008 the film was included on the Italian Ministry of Cultural Heritage’s Hundred Italian films to be saved, a list of 100 films that "have changed the collective memory of the country between 1942 and 1978."

== Plot ==
Massimo lives in luxury, but in reality he is overwhelmed by debts and is tight in the shady business of the racing hall that he manages. To support his illusory rich life, he is forced to turn to usurers. He spends his days with a group of other snobbish and idle young people. Her partner Elena loves her, but he has no qualms about betraying her. His friend Daniele is released from prison, where he ended up despite being innocent, and discovers that Massimo, in order to pocket a derisory sum, had bribed the lawyer who defended Daniele and plotted so that his friend was sentenced. Elena is pregnant and a scam, discovered in her racing room, creates new problems for Massimo.

To silence Daniele, Massimo arranges a meeting with Lucia, her ex-girlfriend, but the girl no longer wants to know about that old love. To get out of Elena's pressures, Massimo convinces a young friend, Sandro, to take responsibility for Elena's pregnancy and to ask his parents for help. In this way he obtains that the girl is entrusted to an unscrupulous doctor who agrees to have her aborted. When Sandro discovers that he has been used and rebels, a fight breaks out and he dies hit by Massimo. To give the impression of a suicide, Massimo throws the body out of the window, at this point Lucia, even though she is in love with him, denounces him and has him arrested. Meanwhile, Elena escapes the clutches of the doctor and decides to continue the pregnancy, while Daniele is not resigned to her, he confesses to Lucia that he still loves her and that he will know how to wait for her.

== Cast ==
- Massimo Serato as Massimo
- Marina Berti as Lucia
- Anna Maria Ferrero as Elena
- Marcello Mastroianni as Daniele
- Sandro Milani as Sandro
- Nyta Dover as Simona
- Rubi D'Alma as La contessa madre
- Vittorio Caprioli as Pierra
- Paola Mori as Lisey
- Carlo Mazzarella as Carletto
- Mimo Billi as Ponzecchi

== Bibliography ==
- Klein, Shira. Italy's Jews from Emancipation to Fascism. Cambridge University Press, 2018.
