= The Knight Has Arrived! =

1950 film

- Directed by: Mario Monicelli; Steno
- Written by: Age & Scarpelli; Marcello Marchesi; Vittorio Metz
- Produced by: Carlo Ponti
- Starring: Tino Scotti; Silvana Pampanini; Nyta Dover
- Cinematography: Mario Bava
- Edited by: Franco Fraticelli
- Music by: Nino Rota
- Production company: Excelsa Film
- Distributed by: Minerva Film
- Release date: 6 December 1950
- Running time: 90 minutes
- Country: Italy
- Language: Italian

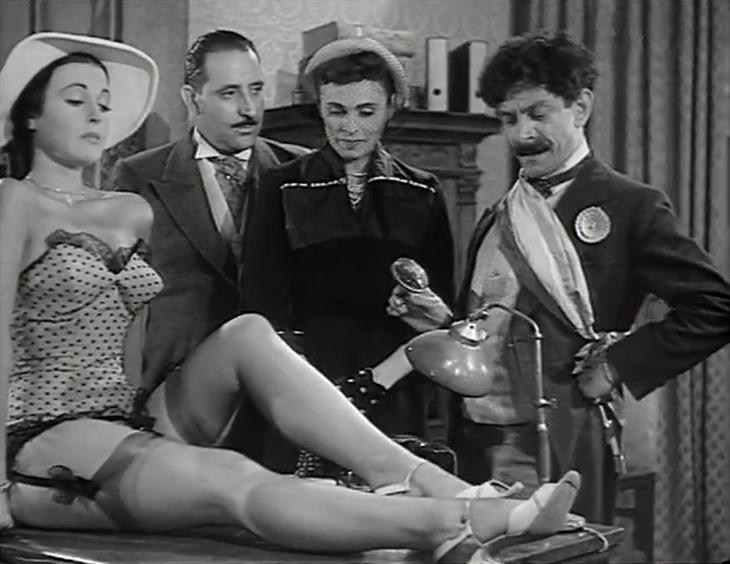
A scene from the film featuring Silvana Pampanini and others

The Knight Has Arrived! (Italian: È arrivato il cavaliere!) is a 1950 Italian comedy film directed by Mario Monicelli and Steno and starring Tino Scotti, Silvana Pampanini and Nyta Dover.

The film's sets were designed by the art director Flavio Mogherini. It earned around 254 million lira at the Italian box office. It was shown as part of a retrospective on Italian comedy at the 67th Venice International Film Festival in 2010.

== Synopsis ==
The eccentric leader of a group of small-time Hawkers known as "The Knight" tries to prevent the area they use from being redeveloped as part of a new business and Metro station complex. Employing a number of surreal schemes, he is eventually successful.

== Cast ==
- Tino Scotti as Il Cavaliere
- Silvana Pampanini as Carla Colombo
- Enrico Viarisio as Il Ministro
- Enzo Biliotti as Il Commissario
- Nyta Dover as Musette
- Rocco D'Assunta as Capo dei Banditi
- Galeazzo Benti as Marchese Bevilacqua
- Marcella Rovena as Signora Varelli
- Alda Mangini as Moglie del Ministro
- Federico Collino as Commendatore Varelli
- Giovanna Galletti as Signora Colombo
- Carlo Mazzarella as L'Assessore
- Arturo Bragaglia as Buchs
- Ettore Jannetti as Signor Colombo

== Bibliography ==
- Chiti, Roberto & Poppi, Roberto. Dizionario del cinema italiano: Dal 1945 al 1959. Gremese Editore, 1991.
