= The Unfaithfuls =

1953 film

- Film poster
- Directed by: Mario Monicelli; Steno
- Written by: Ivo Perilli; Mario Monicelli; Steno; Franco Brusati
- Produced by: Dino De Laurentiis; Carlo Ponti
- Starring: Gina Lollobrigida
- Cinematography: Aldo Tonti
- Edited by: Renato Cinquini
- Music by: Armando Trovajoli
- Release date: 23 January 1953
- Running time: 99 minutes
- Country: Italy
- Language: Italian

The Unfaithfuls (Italian: Le infedeli) is a 1953 Italian melodrama film directed by Mario Monicelli and Steno and starring Gina Lollobrigida.

== Plot ==
A wealthy businessman falls in love with a young model and wants to marry her. But he is married and needs a divorce. The best excuse for this is to catch his actual wife with her lover, but she remains faithful to him. The businessman turns to Osvaldo for help to collect evidence of the infidelity of his wife. But this is not enough to gain him freedom.

== Cast ==
- Gina Lollobrigida as Lulla Possenti
- May Britt as Liliana Rogers
- Pierre Cressoy as Osvaldo Dal Prà
- Tina Lattanzi as Carla Bellaris
- Carlo Romano as Giovanni Azzali
- Irene Papas as Luisa Azzali
- Charles Fawcett as Henry Rogers (as Charles Fawcet)
- Paolo Ferrara as Il commissario
- Giulio Calì as Cantagalli - il proprietario dell'agenzia Lince
- Margherita Bagni as La madre di Marisa
- Tania Weber as L'amica di Lulla
- Carlo Lamas as Carlo, l'autista - amante di Luisa
- Marina Vlady as Marisa (as Marina Wladi)
- Anna Maria Ferrero as Cesarina
- Carlo Mazzarella as The Photographer
