= The Wayward Wife =

1953 film

- Film poster
- Directed by: Mario Soldati
- Written by: Alberto Moravia; Giorgio Bassani; Sandro De Feo; Jean Ferry; Mario Soldati
- Produced by: Attilio Riccio; Antonio Altoviti
- Starring: Gina Lollobrigida
- Cinematography: Aldo Graziati; Domenico Scala
- Edited by: Leo Cattozzo
- Music by: Franco Mannino
- Release date: 18 February 1953
- Running time: 114 minutes
- Country: Italy
- Language: Italian

The Wayward Wife (Italian: La provinciale) is a 1953 Italian melodrama film directed by Mario Soldati. It was entered into the 1953 Cannes Film Festival. In 2008, the film was included on the Italian Ministry of Cultural Heritage’s 100 Italian films to be saved, a list of 100 films that "have changed the collective memory of the country between 1942 and 1978."

== Cast ==
- Gina Lollobrigida as Gemma Vagnuzzi
- Gabriele Ferzetti as Prof. Franco Vagnuzzi
- Franco Interlenghi as Paolo Sartori
- Nanda Primavera as Mrs. Foresi, Gemma's mother
- Marilyn Buferd as Anna Sartori (as Marylin Buferd)
- Barbara Berg as Vannina
- Alda Mangini as Elvira Coceanu
- Renato Baldini as Luciano Vittoni, Gemma's Lover
- Capt. Vernon Jarratt as Mr Renzi (uncredited)
- Gianni Luda (uncredited)
- Anna-Maria Sandri (uncredited)
- Milko Skofic as Marcello (uncredited)
- Alfredo Carpegna as Count Fabrizio Sartori (uncredited)
- Rina Franchetti as The Tailoress (uncredited)
