= Three Steps North =

1951 film by W. Lee Wilder

- Theatrical release poster
- Directed by: W. Lee Wilder
- Screenplay by: Lester Fuller
- Story by: Robert Harari
- Produced by: W. Lee Wilder
- Starring: Lloyd Bridges; Lea Padovani; Aldo Fabrizi
- Cinematography: Aldo Giordani
- Edited by: Ruth Totz
- Music by: Roman Vlad
- Production companies: W. Lee Wilder Productions; Continentalcine
- Distributed by: United Artists
- Release date: June 28, 1951 (New York)
- Running time: 85 minutes
- Countries: Italy; United States
- Languages: English; Italian

Three Steps North is a 1951 Italian-American film noir directed by W. Lee Wilder and starring Lloyd Bridges, Lea Padovani and Aldo Fabrizi. The film is known as Tre passi a nord in Italy.

== Plot ==
Dishonorably discharged after a four-year stint in a military prison for dabbling in black markets while stationed in Italy during World War II, American former soldier Frank Keeler wants to discreetly recover a stash of money that he buried near Amalfi prior to his arrest. His mission is complicated when he is tailed by police and local shady characters guess the purpose of his presence.

== Cast ==
- Lloyd Bridges as Frank Keeler
- Lea Padovani as Elena Ravezza
- Aldo Fabrizi as Pietro
- William Tubbs as Jack Convay
- Dino Galvani as Massina
- Adriano Ambrogi as Baldori
- Gianni Rizzo as The Greek
- Peggy Doro as Mrs. Day
- Adam Genette as Policeman Falzone

== Reception ==
In a contemporary review for The New York Times, critic Bosley Crowther wrote that the film "follows the routine pattern of low-budget American crime films" and concluded: "[A]ll of the tedious maneuvering that Mr. Bridges does to recover his buried treasure, on which other criminals seem to have designs, is grimly routine and unexciting, and the pay-off, which clears up everything, is one of those fatuous fast shuffles that is acceptable only to our prim Production Code."

== See also ==
- List of films in the public domain in the United States
