= William Tubbs =

American actor (1907–1953)

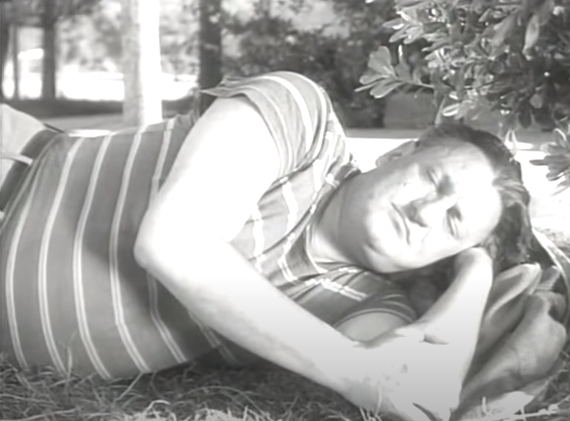
- William Tubbs in A Night of Fame (1951)
- Born: May 10, 1907; Milwaukee, Wisconsin, US
- Died: January 25, 1953 (aged 45); London, England
- Occupation: Actor
- Years active: 1946–1953 (film)

William Tubbs (May 10, 1907 – January 25, 1953) was an American stage and film actor. He appeared in a number of European films in the years after the Second World War, including several by Roberto Rossellini.

== Biography ==
Born on May 10, 1907, in Milwaukee, Tubbs was an insurance man in Hollywood before he became an actor.

After having a heart ailment for many months, Tubbs died on January 25, 1953, in London. At the time of his death he was married to the former Helen McGill, a magazine writer.

== Filmography ==
Year	Title	Role	Notes
1946	Paisan	Captain Bill Martin - the catholic chaplain	(episode V: Appennino Emiliano)
1947	Fatal Symphony		
1949	Private Angelo		Uncredited
1949	The Pirates of Capri	Pignatelli	
1950	Faddija – La legge della vendetta	Pietro	
1950	L'inafferrabile 12	Il dirigente della Roma	
1950	Night Taxi	Mr. William Simon	
1950	Shadow of the Eagle	Boris	
1951	The Rival of the Empress		
1951	Edward and Caroline	Spencer Borch	
1951	Three Steps North	Jack Conway	
1951	A Night of Fame	Antonio	
1951	Quo Vadis	Anaxander	
1951	The Cape of Hope	Commodore Rinaldi	
1951	Cops and Robbers	Mr. Locuzzo, the Tourist	
1952	One Hundred Little Mothers	Prof. Martino Prosperi	
1952	The Machine to Kill Bad People	Padre della ragazza americana / American Tourist	
1952	Europe '51	Professor Alessandrini	
1952	The Golden Coach	Aubergiste	
1953	The Wages of Fear	Bill O'Brien	(final film role)

== Bibliography ==
- Bondanella, Peter. The Films of Roberto Rossellini. Cambridge University Press, 1993.
