= Rocco D'Assunta =

Italian actor (1904–1970)

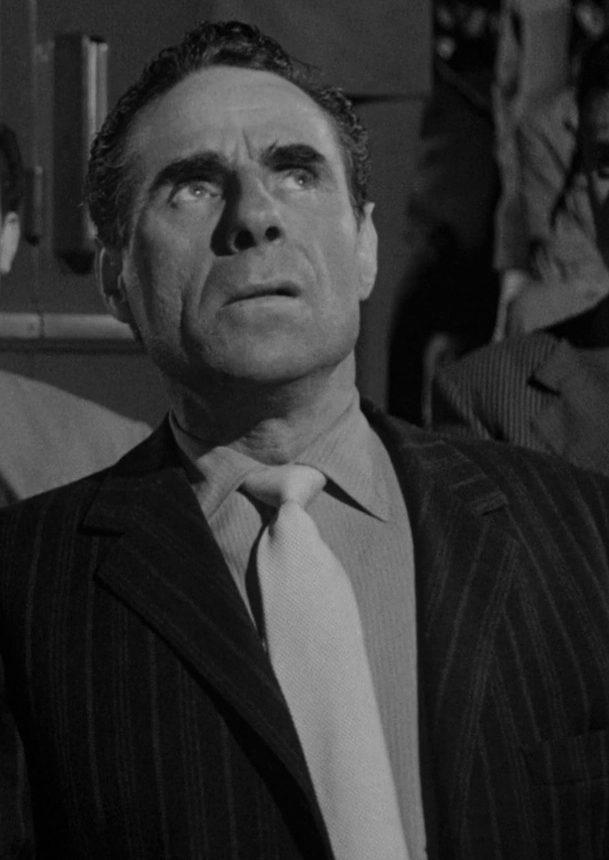
- D'Assunta in An American in Rome (1954)
- Born: 7 February 1904; Palermo
- Died: 27 January 1970 (aged 65); Rome

Rocco D'Assunta (7 February 1904 – 27 January 1970) was an Italian actor, comedian and playwright.

== Life and career ==
Born in Palermo, D'Assunta started acting at very young age with several Sicilian stage companies, including the ones led by Angelo Musco and Giovanni Grasso. At the beginning of the thirties he moved to Rome where he was part of the "Za-Bum Company" directed by Mario Mattoli, then he devoted himself to radio as a member of the "Teatro Comico Musicale" on Radio Roma that got him some popularity thanks to his comic monologues caricaturing typical Sicilian characters. He made his cinema debut in 1933, and was mainly cast in character roles of Sicilian people. He was also active on television.

D'Assunta was also the author, under the pseudonym Roda, of the stage play Io, Angelo Musco, which was first performed in 1962. His daughter Solvejg D'Assunta is also an actress and a voice actress.

== Partial filmography ==
- Nini Falpala (1933)
- Bad Subject (1933)
- Everybody's Secretary (1933)
- Creatures of the Night (1934)
- Red Passport (1935) - Un soldato in trincea
- Golden Arrow (1935)
- King of Diamonds (1936) - Don Cola - il sensale
- Doctor Antonio (1937) - Michele Pironti
- Abandon All Hope (1937)
- The Ferocious Saladin (1937)
- L'antenato (1938)
- Il suo destino (1938) - Il sordo
- L'aria del continente (1939)
- Think It Over Jack (1940) - Customer
- Sempre più difficile (1943) - Cardella
- Christmas at Camp 119 (1947) - Lojacono, il siciliano
- Outlaw Girl (1950) - Don Agatino Santoro
- The Outlaws (1950) - Rocco Creo, the sacristan
- The Knight Has Arrived! (1950) - Capo dei Banditi
- O.K. Nerone (1951) - Pannunzia, the Prefect
- Una bruna indiavolata! (1951) - Il ladro
- Anna (1951) - Un padre
- Cops and Robbers (1951) - Client in Tavern (uncredited)
- Toto in Color (1952) - Il cognato siciliano
- Man, Beast and Virtue (1953) - Zeppo
- Canto per te (1953)
- An American in Rome (1954) - Commissario
- Totò lascia o raddoppia? (1956) - Joe Taccola
- The Wanderers (1956) - Un corteggiatore di Dolores
- Ci sposeremo a Capri (1956) - Onorato Raimondi
- Amaramente (1956) - Luigi Cerelli
- Roulotte e roulette (1959) - Facciponti
- Mafia alla sbarra (1963)
- Liolà (1964)
- Seduced and Abandoned (1964) - Orlando Califano
- I soldi (1965)
