= Europe '51 =

1952 Italian film

- Directed by: Roberto Rossellini
- Written by: Roberto Rossellini; Sandro De Feo; Mario Pannunzio; Ivo Perilli; Brunello Rondi; Diego Fabbri (uncredited); Antonio Pietrangeli (uncredited)
- Produced by: Roberto Rossellini; Carlo Ponti; Dino De Laurentiis
- Starring: Ingrid Bergman; Alexander Knox
- Cinematography: Aldo Tonti
- Edited by: Jolanda Benvenuti
- Music by: Renzo Rossellini
- Production company: Lux Film
- Distributed by: I.F.E. Releasing Corporation
- Release date: 12 September 1952 (Italy)
- Running time: 109 minutes (English version); 118 minutes (Italian version)
- Country: Italy
- Languages: English, Italian

Europe '51 (Italian: Europa '51), also known as The Greatest Love, is a 1952 Italian neorealist film directed by Roberto Rossellini, starring Ingrid Bergman and Alexander Knox. The film follows an industrialist's wife who, after the death of her young son, turns towards a rigorous humanitarianism. In 2008, the film was included on the Italian Ministry of Cultural Heritage’s 100 Italian films to be saved, a list of 100 films that "have changed the collective memory of the country between 1942 and 1978."

== Plot ==
Due to a labour strike, Irene Girard, wife of American industrialist George Girard, returns late to their apartment in post-war Rome, where she is giving a dinner party for their relatives. Her young son Michel laments that she has hardly time for him, to which she replies that it's time for him to grow up and stop being over-sensitive. During dinner, the guests get involved in a debate about politics. While Irene's cousin André, a Communist who writes for a political newspaper, predicts peace for the world, a conservative friend of Irene is convinced that the world is heading straight for war. The party abruptly comes to an end when Michel falls down the building's stairs and is hospitalised for a fracture of the hip bone. At the hospital, Irene learns that Michel might have hurt himself on purpose to receive attention. Irene promises Michel that from now on she will always stay with him. When Michel dies shortly after from a blood clot, Irene falls into a crisis.

After a few days, Irene is called up by André and agrees to meet with him. Like her husband and mother, he urges her to find a way out of her present state and stop blaming herself for Michel's death. If there were anyone to blame, it was post-war society and the child's growing up in fear during a war. He tells Irene of a young boy doomed to die because his poor family can't afford to pay for the expensive medicine. After paying a visit to the boy's home with André, Irene, shaken by the poor circumstances which the family lives in, donates the money needed for the medication. On her next visit, she is thanked by the child's family and the neighbours who gather spontaneously. A young woman neighbour, Ines, shows up and complains about the noise which prevents her from sleeping. The neighbours, speaking disdainfully of her, tell Irene that Ines is working as a prostitute during the night.

Irene meets a young woman living with six children in a small shack by the river. Three of the children are her own, which she had with a lover who left her, while the three others are orphans taken in by her. Asked by Irene to help the young woman, André secures her a job at a local factory. Shortly before her first day at the factory, the young woman tells Irene that she wants to meet a man she once knew and can't show up at her job. Irene steps in for her and is concerned about the working conditions. When she later tells André of her experience, he argues that the exploited have to be freed, even if it means the use of violence. Irene rejects his view, as for her, love is the only answer to the world's troubles, and says that she is dreaming of a paradise both for the living and the departed. At home, she is accused by George of having an affair with André.

After visiting a church, Irene runs into Ines, who just had a confrontation with other prostitutes for streetwalking in their district. Irene takes Ines back to her home, where Ines coughs up blood. She has her examined by a doctor, who declares that Ines is in the final state of tuberculosis and that her case is hopeless. Irene watches over Ines, who eventually dies of her illness. When she goes to a neighbour to bring her the news, she is confronted with their armed teenage son, who is on the run from the police after a bank robbery. Irene helps him escape, but urges him to turn himself in by his own free will.

Irene is taken into custody by the police for helping a delinquent escape. When the teenage robber turns himself in, and George's lawyer appeals to the police arguing that Irene is in a state of shock after her son's death, and that her husband is an important representative of the American industry, she is put under observation in a mental institution. There, she has a discussion with a priest who appreciates her desire to help as being of a true Christian spirit, but argues that all help and acts of love have to follow certain regulations. Irene disagrees, calling these regulations responsible for the evils in this world, which can only be overcome with love and compassion for oneself and everybody else. Shortly after, she witnesses an inmate being rescued from a suicide attempt. She lies down next to the woman, telling her that she is not alone and that she will stay by her side.

Some time later, Irene is questioned by a committee, consisting of representatives of the law, George's lawyer, and the head of the mental institution. Again, she tries to explain her motives by saying that she simply wants to help those who are in need of help, and that salvation is only possible if everyone is saved. As her explanation does neither suffice from a radical political nor a dogmatic Christian point of view, she is declared mentally unstable and institutionalised. Under the window of her room, the family of the saved poor boy, their neighbours and the young woman from the shack have gathered, calling her a saint. Irene looks down at them, both crying and smiling.

== Cast ==
- Ingrid Bergman as Irene Girard
- Alexander Knox as George Girard
- Ettore Giannini as André Casatti
- Giulietta Masina as "Passerotto", the young woman living in the shack
- Teresa Pellati as Ines
- Marcella Rovena as Mrs. Puglisi
- Tina Perna as Cesira
- Sandro Franchina as Michel Girard
- Maria Zanoli as Mrs. Galli
- Silvana Veronese
- William Tubbs as Professor Alessandrini
- Alberto Plebani as Mr. Puglisi
- Eleonora Barracco
- Alfonso Di Stefano
- Alfred Browne as Priest at the mental institution

== Production ==
Long fascinated by Francis of Assisi, to whom he had already dedicated his film Flowers of St. Francis (1950), Roberto Rossellini decided to place a person of the saint's character in post-war Italy and show what the consequences would be. Facing negative critical response to his work and production problems in Italy at the time, he then considered realising the project in Paris. In the first version of the script, co-written by Federico Fellini, Irene, divorced by her husband and left by her lover André, is released from the mental institution and continues her humanitarian work in accordance with Christian dogma. When shooting began in November 1951 (production in Italy had by then been secured), the script was still in the process of re-writing before being finally submitted to the censors in January 1952. In the final version, Irene's personal interpretation of Christianity is rejected by all institutions, including the church, and her son, with whom she was re-united in the earliest script, dies.

In an introduction produced for French television in 1963, Rossellini cited philosopher and activist Simone Weil as another influence on the film's main character. Additionally, film historian Elena Dagrada and Rossellini's daughter Isabella interpreted Irene as a projection of the director's trying to come to terms with the early death of his first son.

The film's sets were designed by Virgilio Marchi, a veteran Futurist architect, together with Ferdinando Ruffo. For the Italian language version, Ingrid Bergman was dubbed by Lydia Simoneschi.

== Release ==
Europe '51 premiered at the Venice Film Festival on 12 September 1952 in a 118 minutes long version, which was shortened by 4 minutes before its release in Italian cinemas on 8 January 1953. Giulio Andreotti, responsible for government policy on cinema between 1947 and 1953, had, among other aspects, questioned the film's portrayal of a Communist caring for a poor, sick child while ignoring the Catholic tradition of charity, and the negative juxtaposition of Irene's Christianity with representatives of the law and the church. This resulted in changes and deletions of religious and political content prior to the film's September premiere, and again before its release in Italian cinemas. Scenes altered or cut included a line in which Irene addresses André as "the dove of peace", or religious quotations by Irene in discussions with André and the priest at the sanatorium. The English language version for the international market ran 9 minutes shorter than the festival version, omitting scenes like Irene watching a newsreel about the relocation of the inhabitants of small village which has to make way for a reservoir dam, or her search for a doctor for Ines.

The film was only a moderate success among cinemagoers in Italy, and even less abroad. Released as The Greatest Love in the US in 1954, it gained little attention, and it was not distributed at all in Great Britain.

In 2013, the Criterion Collection released Europe '51 as part of a three-disc set titled 3 Films By Roberto Rossellini Starring Ingrid Bergman (also containing Stromboli and Journey to Italy), which featured both the English and Italian language versions. The film also received repeated retrospective festival screenings, including the Locarno Film Festival in 1977, the Torino Film Festival in 2000 and the Il Cinema Ritrovato festival in 2015.

== Reception ==
Upon its premiere at the Venice Film Festival, Europe '51 was harshly criticised both from a leftist and a Catholic point of view. Piero Regnoli of the L'Osservatore Romano saw the film as Rossellini's best in years, but criticised the portrayal of the representatives of religious and worldly authorities. In his 1954 review for the New York Times, Bosley Crowther found kind words for star Ingrid Bergman, but dismissed the film as "bleakly superficial and unconvincing". On the other hand, French critic André Bazin called Europe '51 an "accursed masterpiece" which had been misjudged by its critics.

In more recent years, critics have reconsidered the film's qualities. Reviewing the Criterion home media release for The New Yorker in 2013, Richard Brody titled Europe '51 "an exemplary lesson in movie-making". Film historian David Thomson, writing for The New Republic, rated Europe '51 as the most interesting of the three films in the Criterion release, pointing out "a calm and an existential structure not evident in the other two".

== Awards ==
Europe '51 received the International Jury Prize at the Venice Film Festival. Ingrid Bergman won the 1953 Silver Ribbon award from the Italian National Syndicate of Film Journalists and the Volpi Cup for Best Actress at the Venice Film Festival for her performance. The Volpi Cup was not awarded to her in 1952 because she was dubbed (by Lydia Simoneschi) in the version presented at the Festival. However, in 1992 she was awarded posthumously. The prize was accepted by her son Roberto Rossellini.
