= A Night of Fame =

1949 comedy film

- DVD cover
- Directed by: Mario Monicelli; Steno
- Written by: George Tapparelli; Mario Monicelli; Steno; Ernesto Calindri
- Produced by: Maleno Malenotti
- Starring: Marcel Cerdan
- Cinematography: Leonida Barboni; Tonino Delli Colli
- Edited by: Renzo Lucidi
- Release date: 1949
- Running time: 90 minutes
- Country: Italy
- Language: Italian

A Night of Fame (Italian: Al diavolo la celebrità) is a 1949 Italian comedy film directed by Mario Monicelli and Steno.

== Cast ==
- Marcel Cerdan as Maurice Cardan
- Ferruccio Tagliavini as Gino Marini
- Mischa Auer as Bernard Stork
- Marilyn Buferd as Ellen Rawlins
- Carlo Campanini as Emilio Poliazzi
- Leonardo Cortese as Prof. Franco Bresci
- Aldo Silvani as The Devil
- Giuseppe Pierozzi as Prince Khalashivar
- Cesare Polacco as Israelian Delegate
- Alba Arnova as Elena's Sister
- Folco Lulli as Ramirez
- Gianni Rizzo as Max
- William Tubbs as Antonio
- Albert Latasha as Marini's Manager
- Franca Marzi as Flora
