= An American in Rome =

- Directed by: Steno
- Written by: Sandro Continenza; Ettore Scola; Alberto Sordi; Lucio Fulci; Steno
- Produced by: Dino De Laurentiis; Carlo Ponti
- Starring: Alberto Sordi
- Cinematography: Carlo Montuori
- Music by: Angelo Francesco Lavagnino
- Distributed by: Titanus; Minerva Film
- Release date: 1954
- Running time: 84 minutes
- Country: Italy
- Language: Italian

An American in Rome (originally Un americano a Roma) is a 1954 Italian comedy film directed by Steno. The film consists in a satire of Americanization, and it was referred as "a milestone in the evolution of Italian self-identification". It starred Alberto Sordi, with a young Ursula Andress in a minor role. In 2008, the film was included on the Italian Ministry of Cultural Heritage’s 100 Italian films to be saved, a list of 100 films that "have changed the collective memory of the country between 1942 and 1978."

== Overview ==
Sordi reprises the character of Nando Mericoni he played a few months before in an episode of comedy film Un giorno in pretura. The character eventually returned in Sergio Corbucci's Di che segno sei? (1975).

Due to the continuous references of Nando to Kansas City, Alberto Sordi received in 1955 its honorary citizenship. Nando would really refer to the state of Kansas and not to the city (he spoke about the life in the Kansas City and referred to him as a sort of highway policeman of the K.C.).

== Plot summary ==
Italy in the 1950s. The image of grandeur and opulence, brought by the arrival of American troops in 1944, still has its effect on many young Italians. One of them is Ferdinando "Nando" Mericoni (Alberto Sordi), a connoisseur of the American world as represented in American cinema of which he is fervent devotee. Believing his future lies beyond the Atlantic, Nando who is born and raised in Rome, americanizes his life by imitating the sounds of American language and trying to recreate a Hollywood setting in his room, in his antics which leave a trail of victims, especially his now desperate parents, and his girlfriend Elvira (Maria Pia Casilio), who, probably allured by his manner, loves him despite everything.

Nando wears a studded leather bracelet, a cowboy belt, a tight white t-shirt, jeans and baseball cap, refers to his loved ones in what he considers American terms (Elvy, papi, mami) but also lives out everyday situations as though they were scenes in an American film in which he is the main actor.

After several misadventures, he finds his only recourse suggested by a famous film of the time, Fourteen Hours by Henry Hathaway, then he climbs the Colosseum and threatens to kill himself if someone will not help him get to the United States. After endless hours on top of the monument, Nando's dream seems to materialize with the arrival of the American ambassador. The ambassador promises him a journey to the United States and a job there to persuade him to come down, but once Nando comes down the ambassador attacks him furiously. Nando, hospitalized, recognizes the hopelessness of his dreams and desires, but in his heart he will still remain an irreducible American in Rome.

== Cast ==
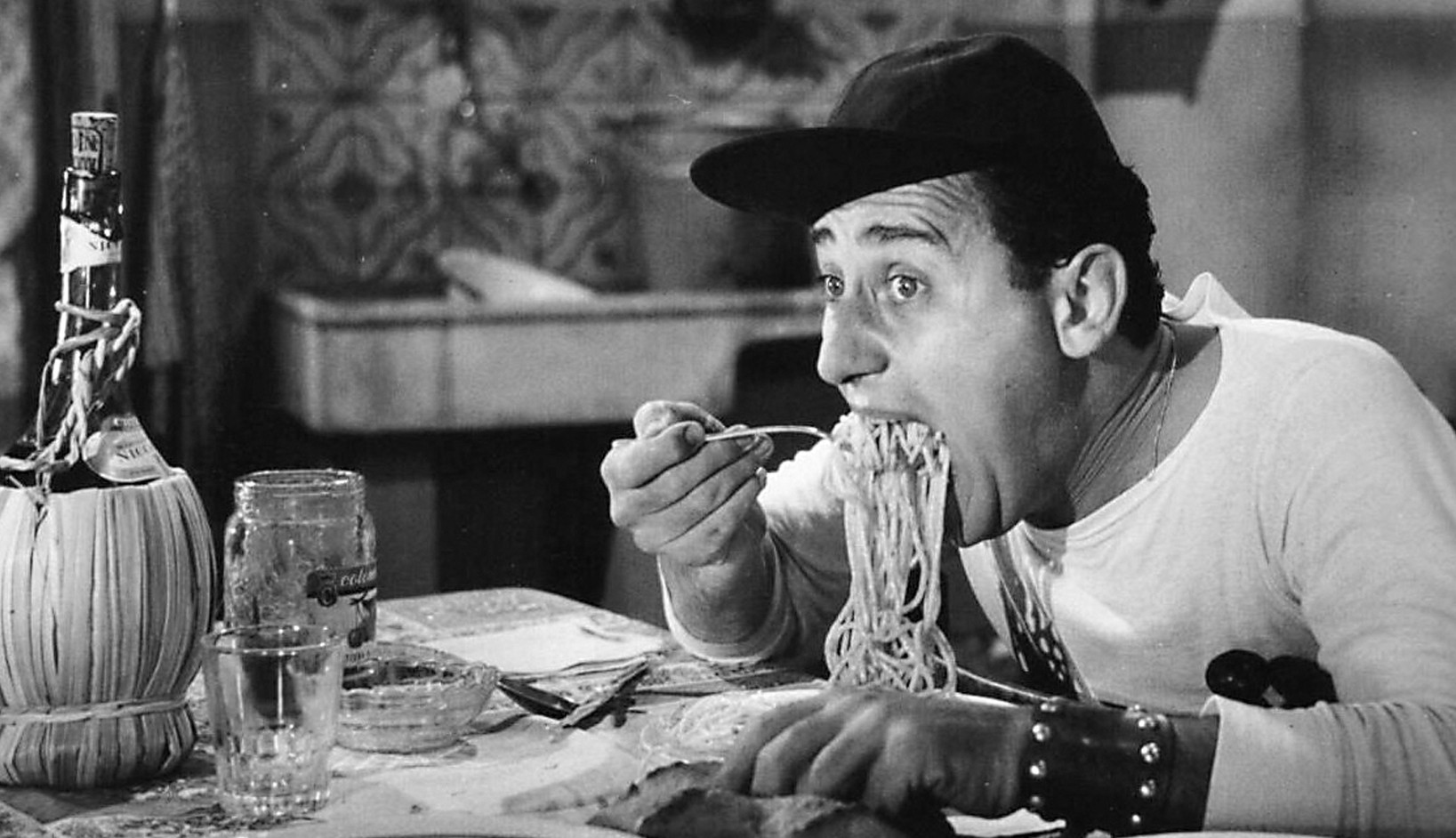
Alberto Sordi in the movie

- Alberto Sordi: Nando Mericoni (Santy Bailor)
- Maria Pia Casilio: Elvira (Elvy)
- Giulio Calì: Father of Nando
- Anita Durante: Mother of Nando
- Ilse Petersen: Molly, the American painter
- Vincenzo Talarico: On. Borgiani
- Carlo Mazzarella: Secretary of the Embassy
- Rocco D'Assunta: Italian Commissioner
- Ursula Andress: Astrid
- Carlo Delle Piane: Romolo Pellacchioni aka "Cicalone"
- Galeazzo Benti: Fred Buonanotte
- Amalia Pellegrini: television spectator
- Leopoldo Trieste: television spectator
- Venantino Venantini : private of Military Police
- Gianna Dauro: Borgiani's wife
- Carlo Loffredo : member Jazz band
