= One Hundred Little Mothers =

1952 film

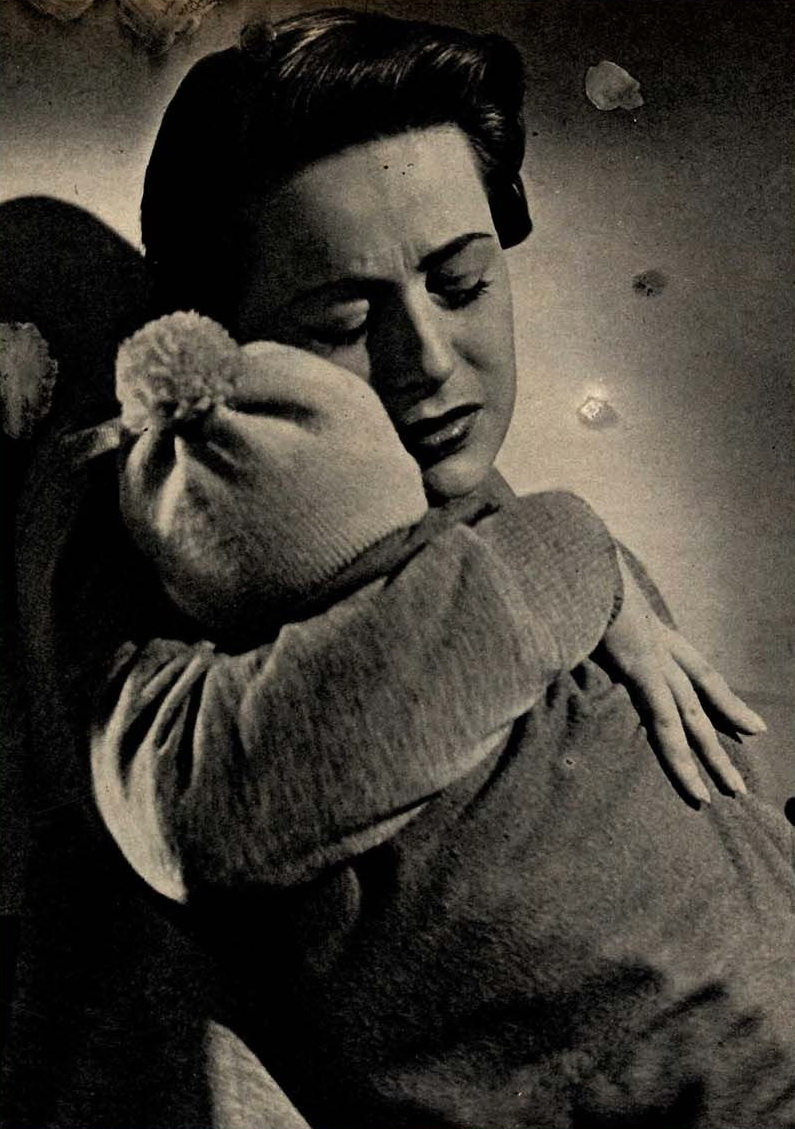
- Lia Amanda in a scene's photo
- Directed by: Giulio Morelli
- Written by: Jean Guitton; Léonide Moguy
- Produced by: Léonide Moguy
- Starring: William Tubbs; Lia Amanda; Clelia Matania
- Cinematography: Giorgio Orsini
- Edited by: Dolores Tamburini
- Music by: Carlo Innocenzi
- Production company: Italian International Film
- Distributed by: Compagnia Edizioni Internazionali Artistiche Distribuzione
- Release date: 11 January 1952
- Running time: 105 minutes
- Country: Italy
- Language: Italian

One Hundred Little Mothers (Italian: Cento piccole mamme) is a 1952 Italian melodrama film directed by Giulio Morelli and starring William Tubbs, Lia Amanda and Clelia Matania. It is a remake of the 1936 French film Forty Little Mothers.

== Cast ==
- William Tubbs as Prof. Martino Prosperi
- Lia Amanda as Anna
- Clelia Matania as director Sampieri
- Checco Durante as commissioner
- Juan de Landa as Don Michele
- Ugo D'Alessio

== See also ==
- Forty Little Mothers (1936)
- Forty Little Mothers (1940)
