= Neapolitan Carousel =

1954 film

- Film poster
- Directed by: Ettore Giannini
- Written by: Remigio Del Grosso; Ettore Giannini; Giuseppe Marotta
- Produced by: Carlo Ponti
- Starring: Léonide Massine; Achille Millo; Agostino Salvietti
- Cinematography: Piero Portalupi
- Edited by: Niccolò Lazzari
- Music by: Raffaele Gervasio
- Production company: Lux Film
- Distributed by: Lux Film
- Release date: 26 May 1954
- Running time: 129 minutes
- Country: Italy
- Language: Italian

Neapolitan Carousel (Italian: Carosello napoletano) is a 1954 Italian comedy film directed by Ettore Giannini and starring Léonide Massine, Achille Millo and Agostino Salvietti. It was entered into the 1954 Cannes Film Festival, winning its International Prize. It was shot at the Cinecittà Studios in Rome and on location in Naples. The film's sets were designed by the art director Mario Chiari.

In 2008, the film was included on the Italian Ministry of Cultural Heritage’s 100 Italian films to be saved, a list of 100 films that "have changed the collective memory of the country between 1942 and 1978."

== Cast ==
- Léonide Massine as Antonio 'Pulcinella' Petito
- Achille Millo as Pulcinella's son
- Agostino Salvietti as Prompter
- Clelia Matania as Donna Concetta
- Paolo Stoppa as Salvatore Esposito
- Maria Fiore as Donna Brigida
- Tina Pica as Capera
- Maria Pia Casilio as Nannina
- Giacomo Rondinella as Luigino
- Sophia Loren as Sisina
- Dolores Palumbo as Sisina's mother
- Loris Gizzi as Erik Gustaffson
- Alberto Bonucci as Lyricist #1
- Vittorio Caprioli as Lyricist #2
- Carlo Mazzarella as Baron
- Vera Nandi as Lilì Kangy
- Yvette Chauviré as Margherita
- Folco Lulli as Don Raffaele
- Antonio Cifariello as Don Armando
- Nadia Gray as The beautiful beggar
- Tino Buazzelli as Capitan Spaccatrippa
- Enrico Viarisio as The Spanish tourist
- Guglielmo Barnabò as The German tourist
- Galeazzo Benti as The French tourist
- Franco Coop as The English tourist

== Bibliography ==
- Chiti, Roberto & Poppi, Roberto. Dizionario del cinema italiano: Dal 1945 al 1959. Gremese Editore, 1991.
