= Alda Mangini =

Italian singer and film actress

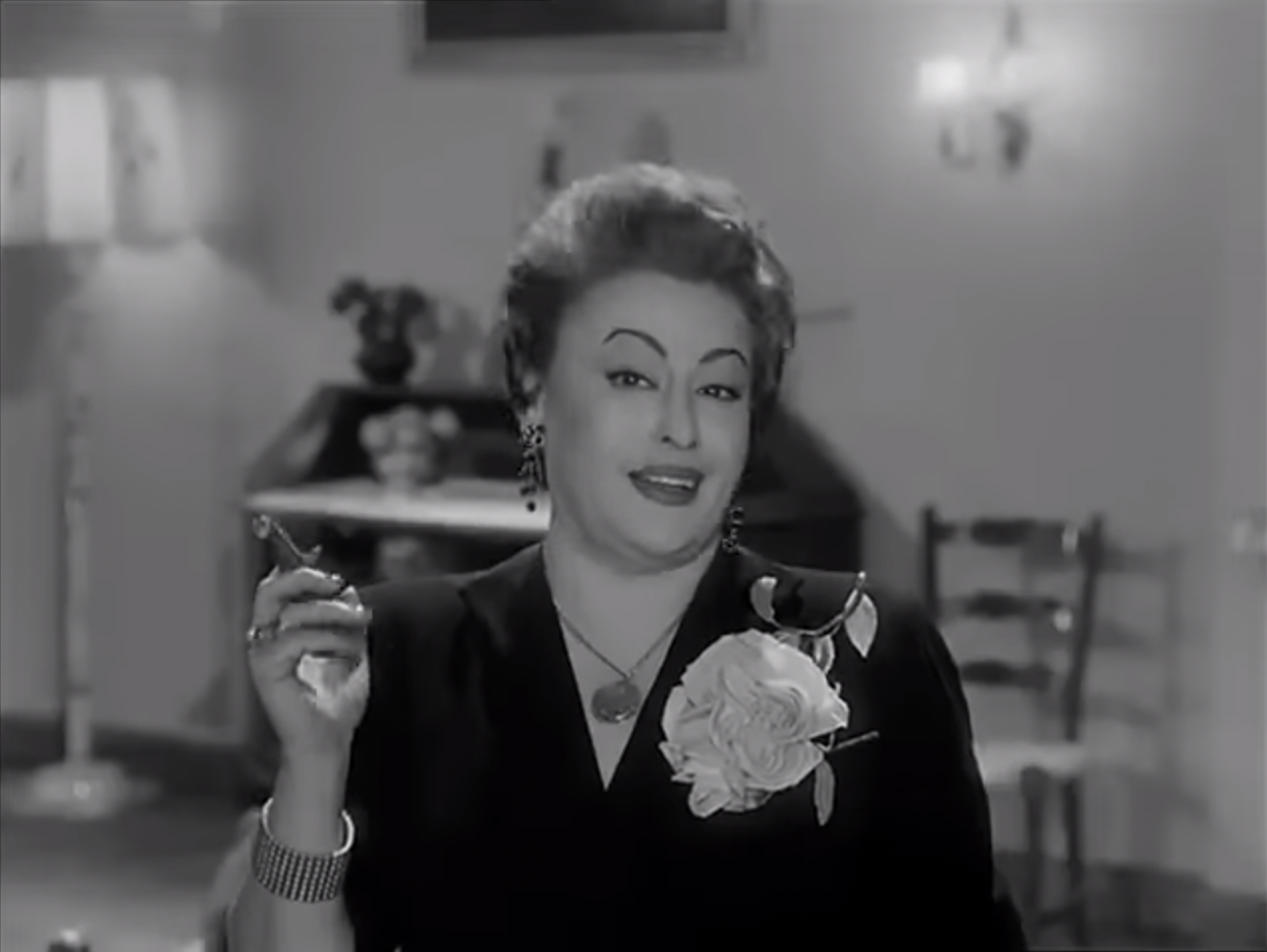
- Mangini in The Pilgrim of Love (1954)
- Born: 13 July 1914; Milan, Lombardy, Kingdom of Italy
- Died: 19 July 1954 (aged 40); Rome, Lazio, Italy
- Occupation: Actress
- Years active: 1940–1954 (film)

Alda Mangini (1914–1954) was an Italian singer and film actress. She appeared in several films alongside the Neapolitan comedian Totò.

== Life and career ==
Born in Milan, Mangini started her career as a lyrical soprano. Shortly later she shifted to theatre, being particularly active in revues, in which she worked with Walter Chiari and Carlo Dapporto, among others. In 1947, she began a successful film career as a character actress, earning personal acclaim for her performance in The Wayward Wife. She was married to the singer Alfredo Clerici, from whom she separated shortly thereafter. She died after a long illness on 19 July 1954, at the age of 40.

== Filmography ==
Year	Title	Role	Notes
1940	Ecco la radio!	Herself	
1947	Vanity		
1948	Fear and Sand	Lady on train	
1948	Toto Tours Italy	Gervasia	
1949	Toto Looks for a House	Amalia, la moglie de Lomacchio	
1949	The Emperor of Capri	Emanuela	
1950	The Cadets of Gascony	Bice	
1950	The Accusation	Adultera al commissariato	
1950	No Peace Under the Olive Tree		
1950	The Knight Has Arrived!	Moglie del Ministro	
1951	O.K. Nerone	Sophonisba, the Sorceress	
1952	Toto and the Women	La signora nel negozio	
1953	The Wayward Wife	Elvira Coceanu	
1953	Easy Years	Fedora Larina	
1953	Ivan, Son of the White Devil	Dunia	
1953	Lasciateci in pace		
1953	Canto per te	Signora Corelli	
1954	It Takes Two to Sin in Love	Olga	
1954	The Country of the Campanelli	Tenerina	
1954	The Pilgrim of Love	Madame Dalia	(final film role)
