= Carlo Mazzarella =

Italian actor and journalist (1919–1993)

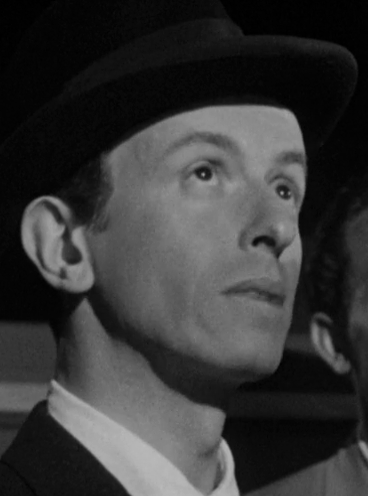
- Mazzarella in An American in Rome (1954)
- Born: 30 July 1919; Genoa, Italy
- Died: 7 March 1993 (aged 73); Rome, Italy
- Occupations: actor, journalist
- Years active: 1945–1073

Carlo Mazzarella (30 July 1919 – 7 March 1993) was an Italian actor and journalist.

== Life and career ==
Born in Genoa, Mazzarella enrolled in the Silvio d’Amico Academy of Dramatic Arts, graduating in 1942. Almost immediately he debuted on stage, working with Anna Proclemer and Sergio Tofano, among others.

In the aftermath of the Second World War, Mazzarella started a prolific film career as a character actor. In 1955 he started a new career as a television journalist for RAI TV, specializing on news about costume, theater and cinema, and gradually abandoning his acting career. He retired in 1985. Mazzarella died of lung cancer at the age of 73.

== Partial filmography ==
- His Young Wife (1945) - Paglieri, il notaio
- The Models of Margutta (1946) - L'esattore
- Felicità perduta (1946)
- Il vento m'ha cantato una canzone (1947)
- Christmas at Camp 119 (1947) - Ignazio (uncredited)
- Arrivederci papà (1948)
- Bitter Rice (1949) - Gianetto
- Vivere a sbafo (1949)
- Snow White and the Seven Thieves (1949) - Ladro
- The Knight Has Arrived! (1950) - L'Assessore (uncredited)
- Cops and Robbers (1951)
- Seven Hours of Trouble (1951) - Ludovico
- Toto in Color (1952) - Il fidanzato de la signora snob
- In Olden Days (1952) - Corteggiatore (segment "Pot-pourri di canzoni") / Quarto testimone (segment "Il processo di Frine") (uncredited)
- Toto and the Women (1952) - Il presentatore del concorso di bellezza (uncredited)
- The Unfaithfuls (1953) - The Photographer (uncredited)
- I Chose Love (1953)
- Era lei che lo voleva! (1953) - (uncredited)
- Eager to Live (1953) - Carletto
- Cinema d'altri tempi (1953)
- Gran Varietà (1954) - (episodio 'Mariantonia')
- Neapolitan Carousel (1954) - Baron
- An American in Rome (1954) - Segretario ambasciata USA (uncredited)
- A Hero of Our Times (1955) - Journalist
- Bravissimo (1955) - A passerby
- Destination Piovarolo (1955) - Il capostazione uscente
- The Bigamist (1956) - Journalist (uncredited)
- Kean: Genius or Scoundrel (1957) - Dario
- Il disco volante (1964) - Reporter (uncredited)
- Lucky Luciano (1973) - Radio Journalist (final film role)
