= Variety Lights =

1951 film

- Film poster
- Directed by: Federico Fellini; Alberto Lattuada
- Screenplay by: Federico Fellini; Alberto Lattuada; Tullio Pinelli; Ennio Flaiano
- Story by: Federico Fellini
- Produced by: Federico Fellini; Alberto Lattuada
- Starring: Peppino De Filippo; Carla Del Poggio; Giulietta Masina
- Cinematography: Otello Martelli
- Edited by: Mario Bonotti
- Production company: Capitolium
- Distributed by: Fincine
- Release date: 12 January 1951
- Running time: 97 minutes
- Country: Italy
- Language: Italian

Variety Lights (Italian: Luci del varietà) is a 1951 Italian romantic drama film produced, directed and written by Federico Fellini and Alberto Lattuada and starring Peppino De Filippo, Carla Del Poggio, and Giulietta Masina. The film is about a beautiful and ambitious young woman who joins a traveling troupe of third-rate vaudevillians and inadvertently causes jealousy and emotional crises. A collaboration with Alberto Lattuada in production, direction, and writing, Variety Lights launched Fellini's directorial career. Prior to this film, Fellini worked primarily as a screenwriter, most notably working on Roberto Rossellini’s Rome, Open City.

In 2008, the film was included on the Italian Ministry of Cultural Heritage’s 100 Italian films to be saved, a list of 100 films that "have changed the collective memory of the country between 1942 and 1978."

== Plot ==
The dancers and other performers struggle to make money from town to town, playing to minimal crowds, while the ageing manager of the company falls in love with a newcomer, to the chagrin of his faithful mistress Melina Amour, played by Fellini's real-life wife, Giulietta Masina. The movie begins with a sold-out vaudeville show in a small Italian town. A young woman, Liliana, played by Carla Del Poggio, sits in the appreciative crowd, enraptured by the performers. That evening, as the troupe boards a train, with two of the performers forced to sit in the train toilet to evade paying the fare, the young woman also boards the train. During the night, she unsuccessfully requests the head of the group, Checco Dal Monte, played by Peppino De Filippo, to join the group. In the morning when the group realizes it does not have enough money to pay for a carriage, Liliana hires the carriage with the last of her money. This saves the group several miles of walking and leads to them accepting her.

At the performance that evening, a sparse and hostile crowd mocks each performer in turn. When the local promoter notices that the crowd responds approvingly to Liliana, he interrupts the performance and directs the group to feature the newcomer. This leads to repeat performances over the next two days to increasingly larger crowds. After the third and final performance, a local wealthy man invites the group to his mansion for dinner. That night Checco realizes he desires Liliana. In the morning, as the group walks towards the train station, Checco abandons his mistress Melina to walk alone with Liliana.

When the group arrives in Rome, Checco leaves it in order to form his own troupe featuring Liliana. Desperate for money, he visits his old troupe and begs Melina for the funds to launch his show. Stricken, she hands him money and orders him to never contact her again. Checco takes the money triumphantly, but as this new group practices, Liliana arrives to tell him she has signed with a competitor. Checco collapses. Liliana has her debut in a minor role as a featured dancer next to the prima donna star of the show. The movie ends with Liliana, sporting an expensive fur coat, boarding a first-class train carriage en route to Milan. On the adjoining track, Checco and his old troupe board a train for Foggia.

In the final scene, the two trains leave the station as Checco, reunited with Melina, begins to flirt with a young woman who sits across the aisle from him. This suggests he is about to begin the cycle once again.

== Cast ==
- Peppino De Filippo as Checco Dal Monte
- Carla Del Poggio as Liliana 'Lily' Antonelli
- Giulietta Masina as Melina Amour
- John Kitzmiller as Trumpet player Johnny
- Folco Lulli as Adelmo Conti
- Dante Maggio as Remo
- Checco Durante as Theater Owner
- Gina Mascetti as Valeria del Sole
- Giulio Calì as Magician Edison Will
- Carlo Romano as Enzo La Rosa
- Silvio Bagolini as Bruno Antonini
- Giacomo Furia as Duke
- Mario De Angelis as Maestro
- Vanja Orico as Gypsy Singer
- Enrico Piergentili as Melina's Father
- Renato Malavasi as Hotelkeeper
- Joseph Falletta as Pistolero Bill
- Fanny Marchiò as Soubrette

== Production ==
The film was shot at the Scalera Studios in Rome and on location in Capranica in Lazio.

== Reception ==
On the review aggregator website Rotten Tomatoes, 100% of 12 critics' reviews are positive. Metacritic, which uses a weighted average, assigned the film a score of 81 out of 100, based on 8 critics, indicating "universal acclaim".
