= La trappola di fuoco =

La Trappola di fuoco
- Release date: 1952
- Country: Italy
- Language: Italian

La Trappola di fuoco (translated into English: The fire trap) is a 1952 Italian film.
