= The Pilgrim of Love =

Pilgrim of Love
- Poster
- Directed by: Andrea Forzano
- Written by: Andrea Forzano
- Produced by: Tullio Aleandri
- Starring: Sophia Loren; Alda Mangini
- Cinematography: Aldo Giordani
- Edited by: Marcella Benvenuti
- Release date: 1954
- Language: Italian

Pilgrim of Love (Italian: Il Pellegrini d'amore), is a 1954 Italian comedy film directed by Andrea Forzano and starring Sophia Loren.

== Plot ==
Two suitors fight over Sophia Loren (as Giulietta) in a gambling house run by Alda Mangini (as Madame Dalia).

== Cast ==
- Sophia Loren as Giulietta / Beppina Delli Colli
- Alda Mangini as Madame Dalia
