= Carlo Ponti =

Italian film producer (1912–2007)

Carlo Ponti OMRI
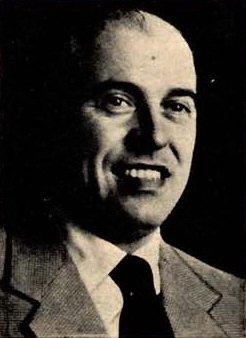
- Ponti in 1951
- Born: Carlo Fortunato Pietro Ponti; 11 December 1912; Magenta, Lombardy, Kingdom of Italy
- Died: 10 January 2007 (aged 94); Geneva, Switzerland
- Education: University of Milan
- Spouses: Giuliana Fiastri (m. 1946; div. 1965) Sophia Loren (m. 1957; ann. 1962) (m. 1966)
- Children: 4; including Carlo Jr. and Edoardo
- Relatives: Maria Scicolone (sister-in-law); Sasha Alexander (daughter-in-law)
- Honours: Order of Merit of the Italian Republic (1st Class)

Carlo Fortunato Pietro Ponti Sr. (11 December 1912 – 10 January 2007) was an Italian film producer with more than 140 productions to his credit. Along with Dino De Laurentiis, he is credited with reinvigorating and popularizing Italian cinema post-World War II, producing some of the country's most acclaimed and financially-successful films of the 1950s and 1960s.

Ponti worked with many of the most important directors of Italian cinema of the era, including Federico Fellini, Michelangelo Antonioni, and Vittorio De Sica, as well as many international directors such as Agnès Varda and David Lean. He helped launch the career of international film star Sophia Loren, whom he married. He won the Academy Award for Best Foreign-Language Film for La Strada (1954) and was nominated for Best Picture for producing Doctor Zhivago (1965). In 1996, he was appointed as a Knight Grand Cross of the Order of Merit of the Italian Republic.

== Early life ==
Ponti was born in Magenta, Lombardy, where his grandfather had been mayor of the city. Ponti studied law at the University of Milan. He joined his father's law firm in Milan and became involved in the film business through negotiating contracts.

== Career ==
=== Early films ===
Ponti attempted to establish a film industry in Milan in 1940 and produced Mario Soldati's Piccolo mondo antico there, starring Alida Valli, in her first notable role. The film dealt with the Italian struggle against the Austrians for the inclusion of northeastern Italy into the Kingdom of Italy during the Risorgimento. The film was successful because it was easy to see "the Austrians as Germans" during World War II. As a result, Ponti was briefly jailed for undermining relations with Nazi Germany.

Ponti accepted an offer from Riccardo Gualino's Lux Film in Rome in 1941. He made Giacomo the Idealist (1943), A Yank in Rome (1946), To Live in Peace (1947), The White Primrose (1948), Prelude to Madness (1948) and Hey Boy (1948).

Ponti produced some films starring Gina Lollobrigida: Alarm Bells (1949), The White Line (1950), A Dog's Life (1950). Her Favourite Husband (1950) was a British-Italian co-production with Jean Kent. He made a number of comedies including Figaro Here, Figaro There (1950), Toto the Third Man (1951) and Toto in Color (1952), with Totò, plus The Knight Has Arrived! (1951), The Piano Tuner Has Arrived (1952) and The Steamship Owner (1951) with Walter Chiari. Ponti alternated this with more serious material such as Europe '51 (1952) from Roberto Rossellini, Brothers of Italy (1952), Lieutenant Giorgio (1953), and Easy Years (1953). The Unfaithfuls (1953) reunited Ponti with Lollobrigida, while Neapolitan Carousel (1954) won the International Prize at Cannes.

=== International breakthrough and Sophia Loren ===
In 1954 Ponti had his greatest artistic success with the production of Federico Fellini's La strada. However, Fellini denied Ponti's role in its success and said that "La Strada was made in spite of Ponti and De Laurentiis". Along with a Toto comedy The Doctor of the Mad (1954) he and de Laurentiis produced an international film, Mambo (1954) directed by Robert Rossen. There was An American in Rome (1955) with Alberto Sordi and The Gold of Naples (1954) with a young Sophia Loren.

Loren was the female lead in Ponti's Attila (1954), a biopic of Attila the Hun with Anthony Quinn that became a big box office success. Loren was in The Miller's Beautiful Wife (1955), a comedy.

Ponti and de Laurentiis made the epic war film War and Peace (1956). In June 1956, his partnership with De Laurentiis ended after more than eighty films over six years.

Ponti continued to produce smaller movies for the Italian market such as The Railroad Man (1956), and Guendalina (1957), but his focus was increasingly on bigger budgeted films aimed at the international market starring Loren: The Black Orchid (1959) with Anthony Quinn, That Kind of Woman (1959) with Tab Hunter, Heller in Pink Tights (1960) with Quinn again, A Breath of Scandal (1960) with John Gavin. Two Women (1960), starring Loren and directed by Vittorio de Sica, was a huge success, winning Loren the Oscar.

=== French films ===
Ponti produced a series of movies in France: Lola (1961) starred Anouk Aimee, A Woman Is a Woman (1961) directed by Jean-Luc Godard, Léon Morin, Priest (1961) from Jean-Pierre Melville starring Jean Paul Belmondo, Cléo from 5 to 7 (1962) from Agnès Varda, Le Doulos (1962) with Belmondo, Landru (1962), plus The Carabineers (1963) and Contempt (1963) from Godard.

Ponti continued to make movies in Italy, notably Boccaccio '70 (1962), Redhead (1962), The Empty Canvas (1962), Break Up (1965) and two with Loren, Yesterday, Today and Tomorrow (1963) and Marriage Italian Style (1964).

=== MGM ===
Ponti produced his most popular and financially successful film, Doctor Zhivago, in 1965; the movie was directed by David Lean and made by MGM. Also for MGM, Ponti produced Operation Crossbow (1965), a war film with Loren, The Girl and the General (1967) with Rod Steiger, Ghosts – Italian Style (1967), and three notable films with Michelangelo Antonioni, Blowup in 1966, Zabriskie Point in 1970 and The Passenger in 1974.

He made The 10th Victim (1965), and some films for Paramount, Smashing Time (1967) Diamonds for Breakfast (1968).

=== Later career ===
Ponti's later movies included The Priest's Wife (1970) with Loren; What? (1972) from Roman Polanski; Giordano Bruno (1973), Torso (1973), a giallo with Suzy Kendall; Dirty Weekend (1973) with Oliver Reed; Mr. Hercules Against Karate (1973); Flesh for Frankenstein (1974); The Voyage (1974) with Loren; Sex Pot (1975) with Loren and Mastroinanni; The Sensuous Nurse (1975) with Ursula Andress; and Down and Dirty (1977),

His final credits included The Cassandra Crossing (1977), an international co-production starring Loren, and A Special Day (1977) with Mastroianni and Loren.

== Personal life ==
=== Marriages ===
In 1946, he married Giuliana Fiastri with whom he had a daughter, Guendalina, in 1951, and a son, Alex, in 1953. While serving as a judge in a beauty contest in 1951, Ponti met a minor actress named Sofia Lazzaro (real name Sofia Costanza Brigida Villani Scicolone). He subsequently cast her in films such as Anna (1951). In 1952, his friend Goffredo Lombardo, head of production at Titanus, changed Lazzaro's name to Sophia Loren.

Five years later, Ponti obtained a Mexican divorce from his first wife and married Sophia Loren by proxy. Divorce was still forbidden in Italy, and he was informed that were he to return there, he would be charged with bigamy, and Loren would be charged with "concubinage".

Ponti co-produced several films in Hollywood starring Loren, establishing her fame. In 1960, he and Loren returned to Italy and, when summoned to court, denied being married. In 1962, they had the marriage annulled, after which Ponti arranged with his first wife, Giuliana, that the three of them move to France (which at that time allowed divorce) and become French citizens. In 1965, Giuliana Ponti divorced her husband, allowing Ponti to marry Loren in 1966 in a civil wedding in Sèvres. They later became French citizens after their application was approved by then-French Prime Minister Georges Pompidou.

Ponti and Loren had two sons:

- Carlo Ponti Jr. (born 29 December 1968)
- Edoardo Ponti (born 6 January 1973)

Their daughters-in-law are Sasha Alexander and Andrea Meszaros. They have four grandchildren.

Loren remained married to Ponti until his death on 10 January 2007 of pulmonary complications.

=== Kidnapping attempts ===
Two unsuccessful attempts were made to kidnap Ponti in 1975, including one involving an attack on his car with gunfire.

=== Smuggling charges ===
He was tried in absentia in 1979 for smuggling money and works of art abroad, fined 22 billion lire, and sentenced to four years in prison. Ponti did not attend the hearing, as his French nationality made him immune from extradition. He was finally cleared of the charges in 1990.

== Art collection ==
Ponti owned works by, among others, Picasso, Georges Braque, Renoir, René Magritte (including his Lumière du pole from 1927), Salvador Dalí, Henry Moore (including his Figure from 1933), Barbara Hepworth, Giorgio de Chirico and Canaletto. His collection was renowned for containing ten works by Francis Bacon. These included examples from his early Van Gogh series, triptychs, self-portraits and pope paintings, which were rarely publicised or lent to public exhibitions. In 1977 the Bacon paintings, then valued at an estimated $6.7 million, were seized and turned over by the Italian government to the Pinacoteca di Brera in Milan; thirty-three sketches by George Grosz went to a museum in Caserta. When Ponti reached a deal with the Italian government and was cleared of the charges brought against him in 1990, he regained possession of 230 confiscated paintings. At some point, the collection is said to have been split between Ponti and Loren.

Over the years, several works have been sold privately. In 2006, two Bacon paintings that had previously been in the Ponti collection were exhibited in an exhibition at the Gagosian Gallery in London. One, a vertical composition of four self-portraits, had already been sold to the American collector Steven A. Cohen. In 2007, another pope painting by Bacon, sold by Ponti in 1991, was sold in a private deal brokered by Acquavella Galleries in New York for more than £15 million. That same year, Study for Portrait II (1956) was consigned by Loren at Christie's; it was auctioned for the record price of £14.2 million ($27.5 million).

== Death ==
Carlo Ponti Sr died on 10 January 2007, in Geneva, Switzerland, after being hospitalized for 10 days for pulmonary complications, aged 94. He was survived by his daughter Guendalina (b. 1951), and his son Alessandro (b. 1953) from his first marriage; and by his second wife, Sophia Loren, and their sons Carlo (b. 1968) and Edoardo Ponti (b. 1973).

His body rests in the family tomb in Magenta, Lombardy.

== Filmography ==
- Piccolo mondo antico (1940)
- Giacomo the Idealist (1943)
- A Yank in Rome (1946)
- To Live in Peace (1947)
- The White Primrose (1947)
- Prelude to Madness (1948)
- Hey Boy (1948)
- Alarm Bells (1949)
- The White Line (1950)
- Her Favourite Husband (1950)
- Figaro Here, Figaro There (1950)
- A Dog's Life (1950)
- The Knight Has Arrived! (1950)
- Toto the Third Man (1951)
- The Steamship Owner (1951)
- Europa '51 (1952)
- Brothers of Italy (1952)
- The Piano Tuner Has Arrived (1952)
- Toto in Color (1952)
- Lieutenant Giorgio (1952)
- Easy Years (1953)
- Le infedeli (1953)
- Neapolitan Carousel (1954)
- La strada (1954)
- The Doctor of the Mad (1954)
- Mambo (1954)
- An American in Rome (1954)
- The Gold of Naples (1954)
- Attila (1954)
- The Miller's Beautiful Wife (1955)
- War and Peace (1956)
- The Railroad Man (1956)
- Guendalina (1957)
- The Black Orchid (1958)
- That Kind of Woman (1959)
- Heller in Pink Tights (1960)
- A Breath of Scandal (1960)
- Two Women (1960)
- Lola (1961)
- A Woman Is a Woman (1961)
- Léon Morin, prêtre (1961)
- Cléo from 5 to 7 (1962)
- Boccaccio '70 (1962)
- Le Doulos (1962)
- L'isola di Arturo (1962)
- Redhead (1962)
- The Empty Canvas (1963)
- Landru (1963)
- Les Carabiniers (1963)
- Contempt (1963)
- Yesterday, Today and Tomorrow (1963)
- Marriage Italian Style (1964)
- Break Up (1965)
- Operation Crossbow (1965)
- The 10th Victim (1965)
- Doctor Zhivago (1965)
- Closely Watched Trains (1965, uncredited)
- Blowup (1966)
- The Firemen's Ball (1967, uncredited)
- Smashing Time (1967, uncredited)
- La Ragazza e il Generale (1967)
- Ghosts – Italian Style (1968)
- Diamonds for Breakfast (1968)
- Zabriskie Point (1970)
- The Priest's Wife (1971)
- Oasis of Fear (1971)
- What? (1972)
- Giordano Bruno (1973)
- Torso (1973)
- Dirty Weekend (1973)
- Mr. Hercules Against Karate (1973)
- Flesh for Frankenstein (1973)
- Gawain and the Green Knight (1973)
- The Voyage (1974)
- The Passenger (1974)
- Sex Pot (1975)
- The Sensuous Nurse (1975)
- Down and Dirty (1976)
- The Cassandra Crossing (1976)
- A Special Day (1977)
