= Ettore Giannini =

Italian screenwriter

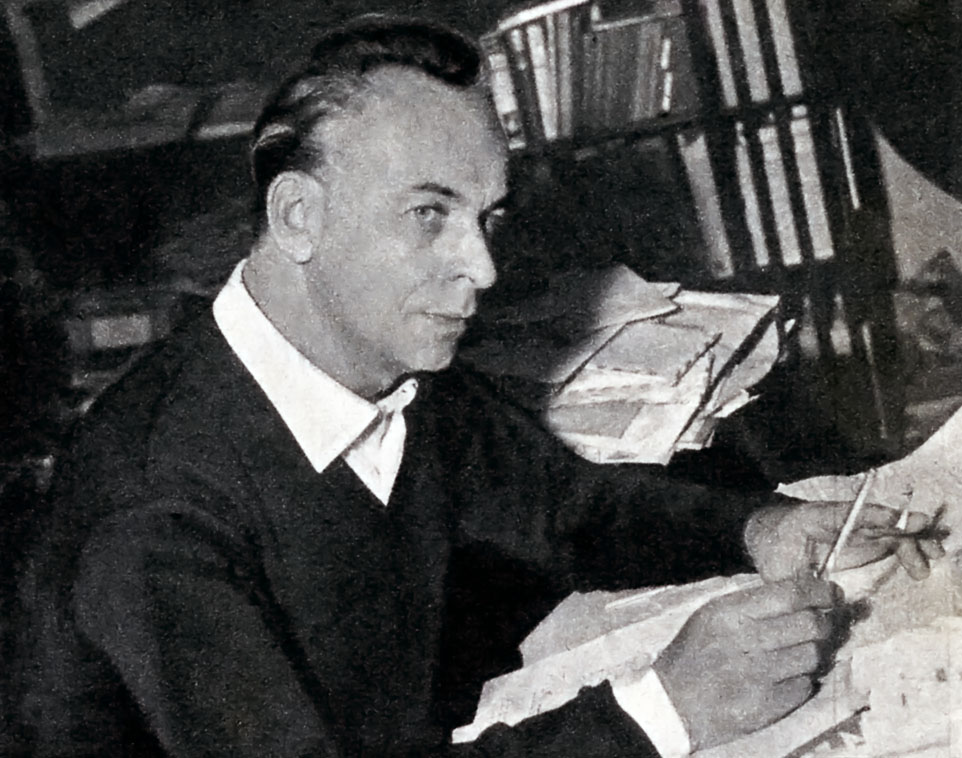
- Born: 15 December 1912; Naples, Italy
- Died: 15 November 1990 (aged 77); Massa Lubrense, Italy
- Occupations: Screenwriter, film director
- Years active: 1936-1967

Ettore Giannini (15 December 1912 – 15 November 1990) was an Italian screenwriter and film director. He wrote for eight films between 1940 and 1967.

== Filmography ==
- The White Angel (1943, director)
- Crossroads of Passion (1948, director)
- Europa '51 (1952) - Andrea Casatti
- The City Stands Trial (1952, writer)
- Neapolitan Carousel (1954, director and writer)
- Master Stroke (1967, writer)
