= Morando Morandini =

Italian film critic, author, journalist and occasional actor

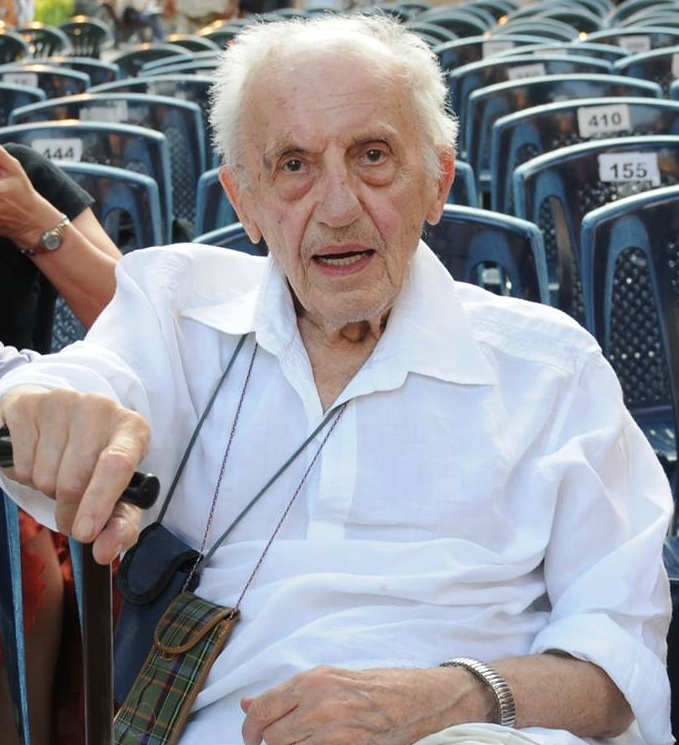
Morando Morandini in 2013

Morando Morandini (21 July 1924 – 17 October 2015) was an Italian film critic, author, journalist and occasional actor.

Born in Milan, Morandini began working as a film critic in 1952 for the La Notte newspaper. Between 1965 and 1998 he was the film critic for the newspaper Il Giorno. He is best known for the book collection of film reviews Il Morandini, he published with the collaboration of his wife Laura and his daughter Luisa for seventeen editions, starting from 1999. He also cured several monographies and wrote a history of cinema together with Goffredo Fofi and Gianni Volpi. In 1964 he played an important role in Bernardo Bertolucci's Before the Revolution. He also directed the Bellaria Film Festival from 1984 to 1997 and again in 2002.

Morandini was the subject of three documentary films, Non sono che un critico by Anna Gorio and Tonino Curagi, Je m'appelle Morando – Alfabeto Morandini by Daniele Segre and Morando's Music by Luigi Faccini. In 1995 he received the Flaiano Prize for his career.
