= Steno (director) =

Italian film director, screenwriter and cinematographer (1917–1988)

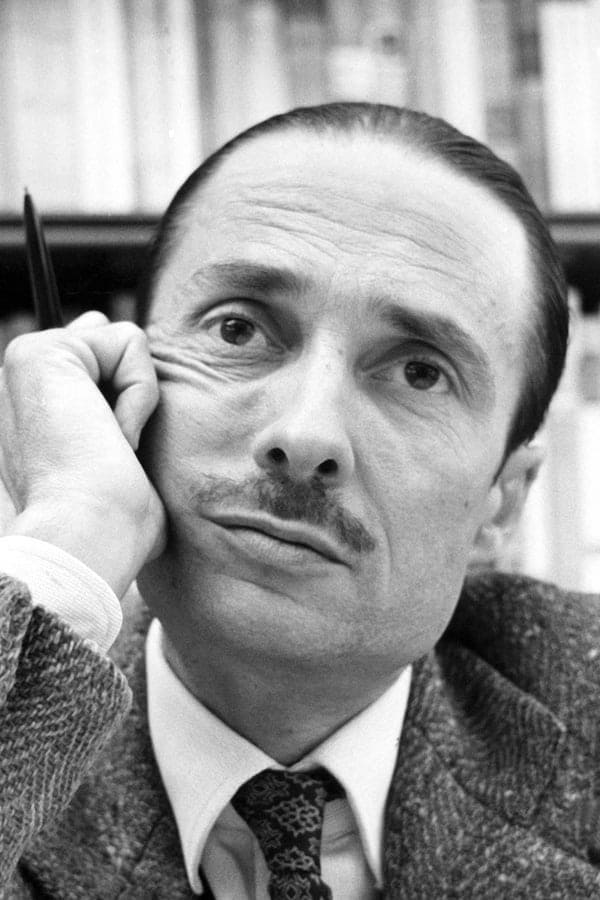
- Steno in the 1960s
- Born: Stefano Vanzina; 19 January 1917; Rome, Italy
- Died: 13 March 1988 (aged 71); Rome, Italy
- Occupations: Film director; screenwriter; cinematographer
- Years active: 1949–1988
- Children: Carlo Vanzina

Signature
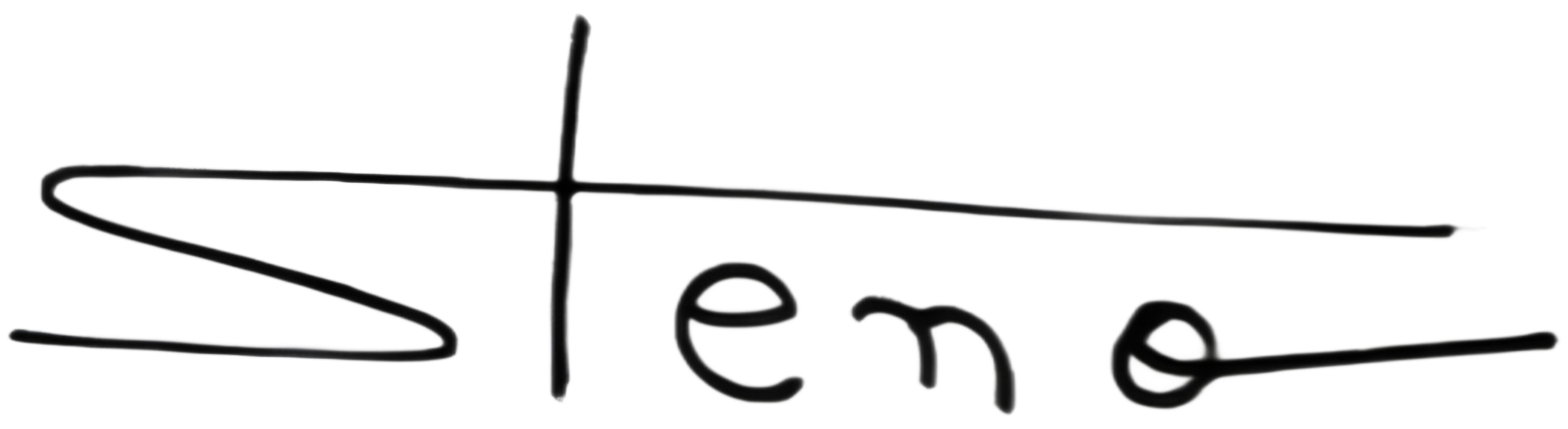

Stefano Vanzina (19 January 1917 – 13 March 1988), known by the artistic name of Steno, was an Italian film director, screenwriter and cinematographer.

== Early life ==
Steno's father, Alberto Vanzina was a journalist from Piedmont working for Corriere della Sera. He emigrated to South America in 1930, founding a newspaper in Venezuela. He met Steno's mother, Giulia Boggio on the ship on the journey over there. Steno was born in Rome, and spent his childhood in Arona.

He studied at the Centro Sperimentale di Cinematografia in Rome, where he started to draw caricatures and write humorous articles, adopting the pseudonym "Steno", as an homage to the novels of Francesca Steno.

== Work ==
Steno started working with Mario Mattoli in 1939, as set designer and writer. Steno's first film credit was with Mattoli for Defendant, Stand Up! (Italian: Imputato, alzatetvi). His first credit as director came in 1949 alongside Mario Monicelli, with A Night of Fame (Italian: Al diavolo la celebrità).

From 1952 onwards Steno directed solo. He directed primarily comedy films, working with some of the great names in Italian cinema, such as Totò and Alberto Sordi, in films including Toto and the King of Rome (Italian: Totò e I re di Roma) An American in Rome (Italian: Un americano a Roma).

Two of his films, Un giorno in pretura (1954) and Febbre da cavallo (1976), were shown in a retrospective section on Italian comedy at the 67th Venice International Film Festival.

== Selected filmography ==
- Abandonment (1940)
- Fourth Page (1942)
- Sealed Lips (1942)
- In High Places (1943)
- Two Hearts Among the Beasts (1943)
- Annabella's Adventure (1943)
- Black Eagle (1946)
- The Courier of the King (1947)
- The Captain's Daughter (1947)
- Fear and Sand (1948)
- The Wolf of the Sila (1949)
- Toto Looks for a House (1949)
- A Night of Fame (1949)
- A Dog's Life (with Mario Monicelli, 1950)
- The Knight Has Arrived! (with Mario Monicelli, 1950)
- Her Favourite Husband (1950)
- I'm in the Revue (1950)
- The Elusive Twelve (1950)
- The Ungrateful Heart (1951)
- Cops and Robbers (with Mario Monicelli, 1951)
- Toto in Color (1952)
- The Unfaithfuls (1953)
- Man, Beast and Virtue (1953)
- An American in Rome (1954)
- A Day in Court (1954)
- Sins of Casanova (1955)
- Nero's Weekend (1956)
- Toto in the Moon (1958)
- The Overtaxed (1959)
- Uncle Was a Vampire (1959)
- Toto in Madrid (1959)
- Letto a tre piazze (1960)
- The Two Colonels (1962)
- Copacabana Palace (1962)
- Totò Diabolicus (1963)
- Toto vs. the Four (1963)
- Letti sbagliati (1965)
- Caprice Italian Style (1968)
- Execution Squad (1972)
- Flatfoot (1973)
- Policewoman (1974)
- Febbre da cavallo (1976)
- Double Murder (1977)
- Amori miei (1978)
- Hot Potato (1979)
- Dr. Jekyll Likes Them Hot (1979)
- Quando la coppia scoppia (1981)
- Banana Joe (1982)
- An Ideal Adventure (1982)
