= Mimmo Poli =

Italian actor (1920–1986)

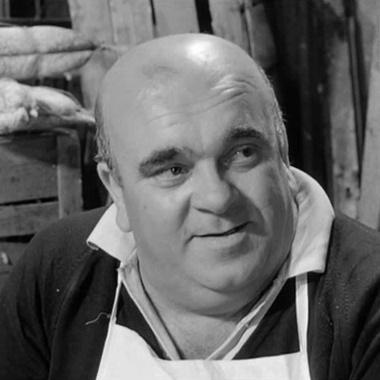
- Poli in the movie Altissima pressione (1965)
- Born: Domenico Poli; April 11, 1920; Rome, Kingdom of Italy
- Died: April 4, 1986 (aged 65); Rome, Italy
- Occupation: Actor
- Years active: 1951–1985

Mimmo Poli (born Domenico Poli, April 11, 1920 – April 4, 1986) was an Italian film character actor.

== Career ==
Poli was one of the best known and most active characters of Italian cinema; in his thirty-five-year career, he appeared in over 200 films. He started from a young age by treading the stages and reciting in Roman dialect.

In 1951 he had a small part in the film Toto and the King of Rome directed by Mario Monicelli. Federico Fellini. He played characters such as bartenders, a docker, a prisoner in the films of the Monnezza to those of Bernardo Bertolucci.

Notable films Poli appears in include The Overcoat (1952) by Alberto Lattuada; Toto in Color (1952) by Steno; Termini Station (1953) by Vittorio De Sica; Beat the Devil by John Huston; Nights of Cabiria (1956) by Federico Fellini; Poor, But Handsome (1956) by Dino Risi; You're on Your Own (1959) by Mauro Bolognini; Totò, Peppino e... la dolce vita (1961) by Sergio Corbucci; The Betrayer (1961) by Roberto Rossellini. He also appeared in many films of Franco and Ciccio. His last film appearance was with I soliti ignoti vent'anni dopo (1985).

== Death ==
Due to serious health problems, he was forced to leave the scene in the mid-eighties. He died from a heart attack on April 4, 1986, at the age of 65.

== Selected filmography ==
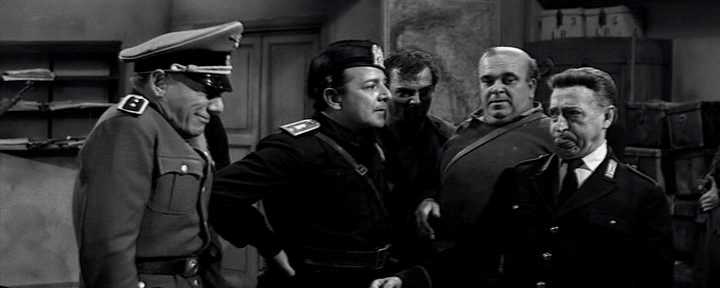
Poli (second right) in The Two Marshals (1961)

- Anna (1951, directed by Alberto Lattuada) – L'infermiere grasso (uncredited)
- Licenza premio (1951, directed by Max Neufeld)
- Toto in Color (1952, directed by Steno)
- Poppy (1952)
- Inganno (1952, directed by Steno and Mario Monicelli) – Un cliente della trattoria
- Toto and the King of Rome (1952, directed by Steno and Mario Monicelli)
- Toto and the Women (1952, directed by Steno and Mario Monicelli) – Male nurse (uncredited)
- We Two Alone (1952, directed by Steno and Marino Girolami, Marcello Marchesi) – Man at the Bus Stop (uncredited)
- Seven Hours of Trouble (1952, directed by Vittorio Metz, Marcello Marchesi) – 'Sfilatino'
- Il tallone d'Achille (1952, directed by Mario Amendola and Ruggero Maccari)
- The Three Pirates (1952, directed by Mario Soldati)
- The Overcoat (1952, directed by Alberto Lattuada)
- Hell Raiders of the Deep (1953, directed by Duilio Coletti)
- The Unfaithfuls (1953, directed by Mario Monicelli and Steno) – Scorza (uncredited)
- Terminal Station (1953, directed by Vittorio De Sica) – Il grassone nel treno (uncredited)
- At the Edge of the City (1953, directed by Carlo Lizzani, Massimo Mida) – Signore (uncredited)
- Roman Holiday (1953, directed by William Wyler) – Worker Hugging the Three Out Side Police Station (uncredited)
- Beat the Devil (1953, directed by John Huston) – Barman (uncredited)
- Ulysses (1954, directed by Mario Camerini) – Procio (uncredited)
- Una pelliccia di visone (1956, directed by Glauco Pellegrini) – Prisoner (uncredited)
- Totò lascia o raddoppia? (1956, directed by Camillo Mastrocinque) – The Man who Pays the Bet (uncredited)
- Nero's Mistress (1956, directed by Steno)
- Allow Me, Daddy! (1956, directed by Mario Bonnard) – Il primo facchino
- Toto, Peppino and the Outlaws (1956, directed by Camillo Mastrocinque) – The Bandits' Cook (uncredited)
- Poor, But Handsome (1957) – The laughing Customer at 'Antica Roma' (uncredited)
- Fathers and Sons (1957) – Man into the Stadium (uncredited)
- Nights of Cabiria (1957, directed by Federico Fellini) – Man Eating in the Nightclub (uncredited)
- Pirate of the Half Moon (1957, directed by Giuseppe Maria Scotese) – Il corsaro grasso
- Pretty But Poor (1957) – Richetto (uncredited)
- Rascel-Fifì (1957, directed by Guido Leoni) – Malone
- La zia d'America va a sciare (1957, directed by Roberto Bianchi Montero) – Bit Part (uncredited)
- La chiamavan Capinera... (1957)
- Love and Chatter (1958, directed by Alessandro Blasetti)
- Fortunella (1958, directed by Eduardo De Filippo) – Orso Bruno, the wrestler (uncredited)
- Ladro lui, ladra lei (1958, directed by Luigi Zampa) – Remo (uncredited)
- Big Deal on Madonna Street (1958, directed by Mario Monicelli) – Prigioniero (uncredited)
- Slave Women of Corinth (1958, directed by Mario Bonnard) – Un Commerciante (uncredited)
- Toto in Paris (1958, directed by Camillo Mastrocinque) – Il grassone del treno
- Il bacio del sole (Don Vesuvio) (1958, directed by Siro Marcellini) – Il grassone
- L'amore nasce a Roma (1958) – Tancredi
- Men and Noblemen (1959) – The snoring Prisoner (uncredited)
- Everyone's in Love (1959) – Man in Lavatory (uncredited)
- Poor Millionaires (1959) – Fat Man on Train (uncredited)
- The Son of the Red Corsair (1959, directed by Primo Zeglio) – Tavern's Patron
- The Moralist (1959, directed by Giorgio Bianchi) – The Policeman on a Bicycle (uncredited)
- La duchessa di Santa Lucia (1959, directed by Roberto Bianchi Montero)
- You're on Your Own (1959, directed by Mauro Bolognini) – Chicken Vendor (uncredited)
- La cento chilometri (1959, directed by Giulio Petroni) – The Bald Remover (uncredited)
- Bad Girls Don't Cry (1959, directed by Mauro Bolognini)
- Il vedovo (1959, directed by Dino Risi) – Man in the Night-club (uncredited)
- Attack of the Moors (1959) – Peasant (uncredited)
- Simpatico mascalzone (1959) – Spettatore a teatro
- Perfide... ma belle! (1959, directed by Giorgio Simonelli) – The fat Lodger at 'Pensione Tecla' (uncredited)
- Nel blu dipinto di blu (1959) – Fat Man at the Bar (uncredited)
- Il raccomandato di ferro (1959) – Lawyer on the Telephone (uncredited)
- Tipi da spiaggia (1959, directed by Mario Mattoli) – Il 'Bagnone' (uncredited)
- Love and Larceny (1960, directed by Dino Risi) – Cook of the Big Restaurant (uncredited)
- Messalina (1960, directed by Vittorio Cottafavi) – Drunken Transvestite
- Il principe fusto (1960, directed by Maurizio Arena)
- La strada dei giganti (1960, directed by Guido Malatesta) – Barman (uncredited)
- Toto, Fabrizi and the Young People Today (1960, directed by Mario Mattoli) (uncredited)
- It Started in Naples (1960, directed by Melville Shavelson) – Man in Bar (uncredited)
- My Friend, Dr. Jekyll (1960, directed by Marino Girolami) – Rufio
- Caccia al marito (1960, directed by Marino Girolami) – Antonio – the lifeguard (uncredited)
- Morgan the Pirate (1960, directed by André De Toth and Primo Zeglio) – Pirate (uncredited)
- Un dollaro di fifa (1960, directed by Giorgio Simonelli) – Zaccaria
- I Teddy boys della canzone (1960, directed by Domenico Paolella) – Un telespettatore (uncredited)
- Ferragosto in bikini (1960, directed by Marino Girolami) – Il padrone del locale
- A qualcuna piace calvo (1960, directed by Mario Amendola) – Uomo alla finestra (uncredited)
- Le Ambiziose (1961, directed by Tony Amendola) – L'onorevole alla festa
- La ragazza sotto il lenzuolo (1961, directed by Marino Girolami) – John Allison
- Totò, Peppino e... la dolce vita (1961, directed by Sergio Corbucci) – Un Ladruncolo (uncredited)
- Il carabiniere a cavallo (1961, directed by Carlo Lizzani) (uncredited)
- Come September (1961, directed by Robert Mulligan) – Commissario (uncredited)
- The Fascist (1961, directed by Luciano Salce) (uncredited)
- The Prisoner of the Iron Mask (1961, directed by Francesco De Feo)
- Vanina Vanini (1961, directed by Roberto Rossellini) – Il boia (uncredited)
- Le magnifiche 7 (1961, directed by Marino Girolami) – Il capitano
- Queen of the Seas (1961, directed by Umberto Lenzi) – Fat man falling
- Duel of the Titans (1961, directed by Sergio Corbucci) – Pastore
- The Two Marshals (1961, directed by Sergio Corbucci) – Portalettere
- Barabbas (1961) – Man in Tavern (uncredited)
- Fra' Manisco cerca guai (1961, directed by Armando William Tamburella) – Un frate
- Totò Diabolicus (1962, directed by Steno) – Il postino
- Samson Against the Sheik (1962, directed by Domenico Paolella) – Chambelain
- Colpo gobbo all'italiana (1962, directed by Lucio Fulci) – L'oste
- Lo smemorato di Collegno (1962, directed by Sergio Corbucci) – L'Uomo panchina (uncredited)
- Sodom and Gomorrah (1962, directed by Robert Aldrich) – Queen's Cupbearer (uncredited)
- The Changing of the Guard (1962) – Autista dei fascisti (uncredited)
- I motorizzati (1962, directed by Camillo Mastrocinque) – Vittorio (uncredited)
- Carmen, 70 (1962) – Customer Eating Spaghetti (uncredited)
- Sexy Toto (1963, directed by Mario Amendola) – Un galeotto – inmate #1
- The Two Colonels (1963, directed by Steno) – Fat Soldier (uncredited)
- The Monk of Monza (1963, directed by Sergio Corbucci) – Il frate cercatore
- Torpedo Bay (1963, directed by Charles Frend and Bruno Vailati) – Nightclub Owner
- Gli onorevoli (1963, directed by Sergio Corbucci) – MSI supporter (uncredited)
- Vino, whisky e acqua salata (1963, directed by Mario Amendola)
- I marziani hanno 12 mani (1964) – Tifoso allo stadio
- Indios a Nord-Ovest (1964)
- Two Mafiamen in the Far West (1964) – Saloon Patron
- I due evasi di Sing Sing (1964, directed by Lucio Fulci) – Speaker
- Triumph of the Ten Gladiators (1964, directed by Nick Nostro) – Tavern Owner (uncredited)
- Biblioteca di Studio Uno (1964, TV Mini-Series) – Un carceriere
- I Kill, You Kill (1965) – Sicilian man (segment "Cavalleria Rusticana, oggi")
- Challenge of the Gladiator (1965, directed by Domenico Paolella) – Roman at Orgy (uncredited)
- Sons of the Leopard (1965, directed by Sergio Corbucci) – Farm manager
- Two Sergeants of General Custer (1965) – Sugar – Barman (uncredited)
- Hercules the Avenger (1965, directed by Maurizio Lucidi) – Gerone
- Highest Pressure (1965, directed by Enzo Trapani) – Il salumiere
- Colorado Charlie (1965, directed by Roberto Mauri) – Jack, Springfield Barman
- Io, io, io... e gli altri (1966, directed by Alessandro Blasetti) (uncredited)
- All the Way to Paris (1966) – Italian Butcher
- Vacanze sulla neve (1966, directed by Filippo Walter Ratti)
- After the Fox (1966) – Fat Actor
- For a Few Extra Dollars (1966) – Saloon Patron (uncredited)
- Trappola per sette spie (1966)
- The Hellbenders (1967) – Man in Saloon (uncredited)
- Up the MacGregors (1967) – Barman (uncredited)
- The Honey Pot (1967) – Cook (uncredited)
- The Magnificent Texan (1967, directed by Luigi Capuano) – Barman #2 (uncredited)
- How to Kill 400 Duponts (1967) – Gustavo Dupont (uncredited)
- On My Way to the Crusades, I Met a Girl Who... (1967) – Minor Role
- Untamable Angelique (1967) – Offerer (uncredited)
- Bang Bang Kid (1967, directed by Giorgio Gentili and Luciano Lelli) – Bartender
- The Crazy Kids of the War (1967) – German Soldier (uncredited)
- Gli altri, gli altri,... e noi (1967)
- Se vuoi vivere... spara! (1968) – Bartender
- Gunman Sent by God (1968) – Barman
- Brutti di notte (1968) – Man in Piazza Navona
- A Minute to Pray, a Second to Die (1968, directed by Franco Giraldi) – Man in Saloon (uncredited)
- Spirits of the Dead (1968) – Taxi Driver / Party Guest (segment "Toby Dammit") (uncredited)
- Donne... botte e bersaglieri (1968) – Lo Giudice (uncredited)
- A Sky Full of Stars for a Roof (1968) – Shopkeeper (uncredited)
- Don Chisciotte and Sancio Panza (1968, directed by Giovanni Grimaldi) – Tavern customer
- The Great Silence (1968) – Barman (uncredited)
- Stuntman (1968) – Man with caravan
- Bootleggers (1969, directed by Alfio Caltabiano) – Suitor
- Il ragazzo che sorride (1969, directed by Aldo Grimaldi) – Porter
- I quattro del pater noster (1969) (uncredited)
- Sabata ì (1969) – Hotel Workman (uncredited)
- The Thirteen Chairs (1969) – De Seta's Caretaker (uncredited)
- Agguato sul Bosforo (1969) – Informer at Club (uncredited)
- The Specialist (1969) – Barman
- Zorro marchese di Navarra (1969, directed by Franco Montemurro) – Taverner
- Poppea's Hot Nights (1969) – Prurient Roman at Market Place (uncredited)
- La donna a una dimensione (1969, directed by Bruno Baratti) – Fatman on TV (uncredited)
- Satiricosissimo (1970) – Party Guest (uncredited)
- Nel giorno del Signore (1970)
- Mio padre monsignore (1971, directed by Antonio Racioppi) – Storyteller
- Riuscirà l'avvocato Franco Benenato a sconfiggere il suo acerrimo nemico il pretore Ciccio De Ingras? (1971) – Barman del saloon (uncredited)
- Er Più – storia d'amore e di coltello (1971) – Owner of 'Cornuto' Restaurant
- When Men Carried Clubs and Women Played Ding-Dong (1971)
- Siamo tutti in libertà provvisoria (1971) – Old Man with Prostitute
- Roma (1972) – Roman Eating in Terrace (uncredited)
- Boccaccio (1972) – Spettatore grasso
- His Name Was Holy Ghost (1972) – Barman
- My Horse, My Gun, Your Widow (1972, directed by Juan Bosch) – Innkeeper (uncredited)
- Man Called Amen (1972, directed by Alfio Caltabiano) – Bell Ringer (uncredited)
- More Sexy Canterbury Tales (1972) – Frate grasso (uncredited)
- Il terrore con gli occhi storti (1972) – Barman al party
- Lo chiameremo Andrea (1972) – Spot's Actor (uncredited)
- Poppea: A Prostitute in Service of the Emperor (1972)
- The Mighty Anselmo and His Squire (1972) – Oste
- Storia di fifa e di coltello – Er seguito d'er più (1972)
- Colpo grosso a Porto Said (1972, directed by Luigi Batzella)
- We Want the Colonels (1973) – Man who sees the flare (uncredited)
- Novelle licenziose di vergini vogliose (1973) – Friar
- Flatfoot (1973) (uncredited)
- Polvere di stelle (1973) (uncredited)
- Diario di una vergine romana (1973) – Livia Fat Customer (uncredited)
- The Arena (1974) – Man at the Orgy (uncredited)
- Trinity Plus the Clown and a Guitar (1975) – Saloon Owner
- La polizia interviene: ordine di uccidere! (1975)
- Hit Squad (1976) – Gaetano Bozzetti
- 1900 (1976) – Fascist (uncredited)
- The Cop in Blue Jeans (1976) – Vittorio Raganelli detto Il Mussulmano
- The Last Round (1976, directed by Stelvio Massi) – Garage Owner
- Fear in the City (1976, directed by Giuseppe Rosati)
- Destruction Force (1977) – Barman
- Messalina, Messalina! (1977) – Man in Tavern (uncredited)
- Highway Racer (1977) – Peppone – the informer
- Swindle (1977) – Milady (uncredited)
- Il figlio dello sceicco (1977) – Abdul
- Brothers Till We Die (1978) – Salvatore (uncredited)
- La Cage aux Folles (1978) – Le barman (uncredited)
- Odds and Evens (1978) – Shop Owner (uncredited)
- The Gang That Sold America (1979) – Arab (in pre-title sequence) (uncredited)
- Neapolitan Mystery (1979) – Asylum cook (uncredited)
- La Luna (1979) – Piano Mover
- La liceale, il diavolo e l'acquasanta (1979) – Uomo scippato
- Sexual aberration - Sesso perverso (1979, directed by Bruno Mattei) – Asian
- Flatfoot in Egypt (1980)
- City of Women (1980) – Party Guest (uncredited)
- Sugar, Honey and Pepper (1980) (uncredited)
- I'm Getting a Yacht (1980) – Car park attendant
- Delitto a Porta Romana (1980)
- Uno contro l'altro, praticamente amici (1981) – Er Buiaccaro
- Crime at the Chinese Restaurant (1981) – Gasparotto
- Il Marchese del Grillo (1981) – Oste (uncredited)
- Bomber (1982) – Cook (uncredited)
- Delitto sull'autostrada (1982) – Oste (uncredited)
- Monsignore (1982) – Sicilian Priest
- Pronto... Lucia (1982) – Barman ristorante in Austria (uncredited)
- Dio li fa poi li accoppia (1982) – The Taxi Driver in Rome (uncredited)
- Count Tacchia (1982) – Priest (uncredited)
- La sai l'ultima sui matti? (1982) – Matto
- Vieni avanti cretino (1982)
- La casa stregata (1982)
- Il diavolo e l'acquasanta (1983) – Tassista
- A tu per tu (1984)
- Mi faccia causa (1984)
- Big Deal After 20 Years (1985) – Cesare
