= Te lo leggo negli occhi (song) =

Single by Dino

from the album Dino
- B-side: "Cerca di capire"
- Released: 1964
- Genre: Pop
- Length: 2:43
- Label: Arc
- Songwriter(s): Sergio Bardotti, Sergio Endrigo
- Producer(s): Ferruccio Ricordi

Dino singles chronology
"Eravamo amici" (1964)	"Te lo leggo negli occhi" (1964)	"Il ballo della bussola" (1965)

Audio
- "Te lo leggo negli occhi" on YouTube

"Te lo leggo negli occhi" (transl. 'I can see it in your eyes') is a 1964 Italian song composed by Sergio Endrigo (music) and Sergio Bardotti (lyrics) and performed by Dino.

== Background ==
Endrigo composed the song in an hotel in Naples, shortly after participating, together with Achille Millo and Lilian Terry, in a RAI television show about George Gershwin. The song featured Alessandro Alessandroni's Cantori Moderni on backing vocals and the orchestra conducted by Ennio Morricone. It premiered at the Festival delle Rose, where it placed third. It marked the breakout of Dino and became his signature song.

The song was adapted into a musicarello film with the same title, directed by Camillo Mastrocinque and starring Agnès Spaak and the same Dino.

Artists who covered the song include Gianni Morandi, Franco Battiato, Giorgio Gaber and Paolo Mengoli. Endrigo never recorded the song, as he declared "Dino's version was so perfect, what could I have possibly added to that song?".

== Track listing ==
No.	Title	Writer(s)	Length
1.	"Te lo leggo negli occhi"	Endrigo, Bardotti	2:43
2.	"Cerca di capire"	John Lennon, Paul McCartney, Don Backy	2:17

== Charts ==
Chart (1964–5)	Peak position
Italy (Musica e dischi)	7
