= Totòtruffa 62 =

1961 film directed by Camillo Mastrocinque

Totòtruffa '62
- Directed by: Camillo Mastrocinque
- Written by: Castellano & Pipolo
- Produced by: Isidoro Broggi
- Starring: Totò; Nino Taranto; Estella Blain; Geronimo Meynier; Carla Macelloni; Lia Zoppelli; Ernesto Calindri
- Cinematography: Mario Fioretti
- Edited by: Gisa Radicchi Levi
- Music by: Gianni Ferrio
- Distributed by: Titanus
- Release date: 1961
- Running time: 106 min
- Country: Italy
- Language: Italian

Totòtruffa '62 (also known as Totó Vigarista) is a 1961 Italian comedy film directed by Camillo Mastrocinque.

== Plot summary ==
Antonio is a poor man who has to support his daughter and especially he should pay her stay at a prestigious boarding school to study dance. Antonio so starts with his friend Camillo to deceive the poor people of Rome stealing many sums of money with various confidence tricks. Among the various scams that famous are the receipt of a billion dollars for the prince of Katanga (Antonio in blackface) and the sale of the Trevi Fountain to a foolish entrepreneur.

== Cast ==
- Totò: Antonio Peluffo
- Nino Taranto: Camillo
- Estella Blain: Diana Peluffo
- Ernesto Calindri: Commissario Malvasia
- Geronimo Meynier: Franco Malvasia
- Luigi Pavese: cav. Terlizzi
- Lia Zoppelli: La direttrice
- Carla Macelloni: Paola
- Mario Castellani: Il professore
- Oreste Lionello: Pippo, l'amico di Franco
- John Kitzmiller: L'ambasciatore del Catonga
- Ugo D'Alessio: Decio Cavallo, the tourist
- Renzo Palmer: Baldassarre
- Ignazio Leone: Il vigile urbano
- Amedeo Girard: Amilcare
- Wee Willie Harris: the singer at "La giostra"
- Peppino De Martino: dottor Marchi, il questore
- Pietro De Vico: Il contatore di piccioni
- Evi Marandi: Una collegiale
- Milena Vukotic: Una collegiale
