= Franco Giacobini =

Italian actor (1926–2015)

Francesco Giacobini
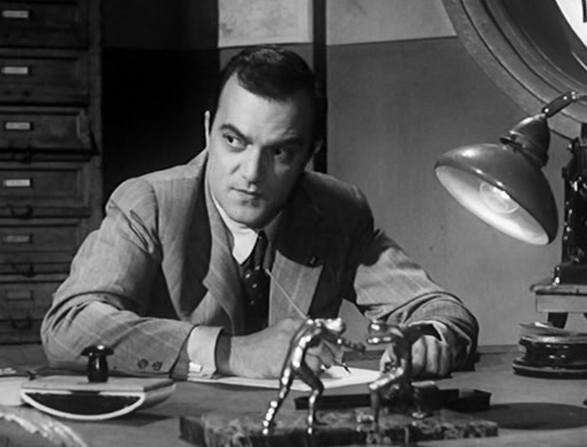
- Franco Giacobini in 1962 in Il mio amico Benito
- Born: Francesco Giacobini; 15 March 1926; Rome, Kingdom of Italy
- Died: 27 December 2015 (aged 89); Rome, Italy
- Education: Accademia Nazionale di Arte Drammatica Silvio D'Amico
- Occupation: Actor

Franco Giacobini (5 March 1926 – 27 December 2015) was an Italian actor.

Born in Rome as Francesco Giacobini, he graduated at Accademia Nazionale di Arte Drammatica Silvio D'Amico in 1948, then started a prolific stage career, working in comedy plays, dramas and revues. Giacobini also appeared in numerous films and TV-works, usually in comedic roles. He was married to actress Angela Goodwin.

== Selected filmography ==
- Papà diventa mamma (1952) - Il passeggero sul Tram
- Le marchand de Venise (1953)
- Ci troviamo in galleria (1953) - Funzionario RAI
- Via Padova 46 (1953) - The Journalist (uncredited)
- Caporale di giornata (1958) - The Sailor on the Telephone (uncredited)
- La cento chilometri (1959) - The Race Walker without His Underpants
- Uncle Was a Vampire (1959) - Il secondo play boy
- The Employee (1960) - Rotondi
- Run with the Devil (1960) - The TV Interviewer (uncredited)
- The Fascist (1961) - Militare a Rocca Sabina
- The Orderly (1961)
- Hercules in the Haunted World (1961) - Telemachus (Telemaco)
- Cronache del '22 (1961)
- Erik the Conqueror (1961) - Rustichello
- A cavallo della tigre (1961) - Medico del carcere
- The Two Marshals (1961) - Basilio Meneghetti
- His Women (1961) - The Police Commissioner
- Il mio amico Benito (1962) - Liberati
- Crazy Desire (1962) - Alberghetti
- Totò Diabolicus (1962) - Dottor Santoro
- La bellezza di Ippolita (1962) - Aurelio
- Eighteen in the Sun (1962) - Commissar
- Lo smemorato di Collegno (1962) - Giornalista
- Le Scorpion (1962)
- I motorizzati (1962) - Alberto
- Sherlock Holmes and the Deadly Necklace (1962) - Texas Collector
- The Shortest Day (1963) - (uncredited)
- Uno strano tipo (1963) - Journalist
- Sexy Toto (1963) - Un galeotti
- The Swindlers (1963) - The Lawyer Ovidio (segment "Società calcistica, La")
- Gli onorevoli (1963) - De Angelis
- La ballata dei mariti (1963) - Vicebrigadiere Licata
- Senza sole né luna (1964)
- I Kill, You Kill (1965) - Dottore (segment "Una boccata di fumo")
- Soldati e caporali (1965) - Serg. Pancani
- Assassination in Rome (1965)
- Two Sergeants of General Custer (1965) - Cochise
- Le sedicenni (1965)
- El Greco (1966) - Francisco
- Zärtliche Haie (1967) - Fähnrich
- O.K. Connery (1967) - Juan
- I 2 vigili (1967) - Romoletto
- Soldati e capelloni (1967) - Franco - il barbiere
- Quarta parete (1968)
- Donne... botte e bersaglieri (1968) - Marshal
- Don Chisciotte and Sancio Panza (1968) - Don Nicola - barber
- Dismissed on His Wedding Night (1968) - Facchetti
- The Mercenary (1968) - Pepote
- Chimera (1968) - Sergeant
- Alibi (1969) - Luca
- Why Did I Ever Say Yes Twice? (1969) - Roberto
- Terzo Canale - Avventura a Montecarlo (1970) - Mechanic
- Mazzabubù... Quante corna stanno quaggiù? (1971) - Boemondo
- It Can Be Done Amigo (1972) - L'uomo chi mangia la terra
- Sonny and Jed (1972) - Aparicito
- Abbasso tutti, viva noi (1974) - Teacher
- The Student Connection (1974) - Chief Inspector Delon
- Il gatto mammone (1975) - Priest
- As of Tomorrow (1976) - Maresciallo delle Carabinieri (uncredited)
- Three Tigers Against Three Tigers (1977) - Servant of Di Lazzaro
- Pane, burro e marmellata (1977) - Simona's Husband
- I'm Getting a Yacht (1980) - Fugitive #1
- Sing Sing (1983) - Baron Orfeo della Torre (first story)
- Scrivilo sui muri (2007) - Anziano
- Il volto di un'altra (2012) - Proprietario del negozio di animali impagliati
