= Olimpia Cavalli =

Italian actress (1930–2012)

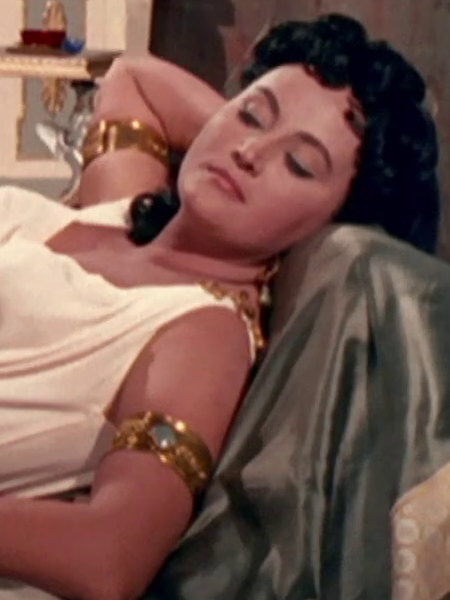
- Cavalli in I baccanali di Tiberio (1960)
- Born: 30 August 1930; Cadeo, Piacenza, Kingdom of Italy
- Died: 29 March 2012 (aged 81); Rome, Italy
- Occupation: Actress

Olimpia Cavalli (30 August 1930 – 29 March 2012) was an Italian actress.

Born in Cadeo, Italy, she was mainly active between the late fifties and mid-sixties. After being a star on avanspettacolo alongside Erminio Macario, she made her film debut in 1959 in the comedy La cambiale by Camillo Mastrocinque. After a number of films, including Roberto Rossellini's Vanina Vanini, Dino Risi's The Thursday, Sergio Corbucci's The Two Marshals and Ugo Tognazzi's His Women, in 1966 she married and retired from showbusiness. After a long hiatus, she resumed her activities in 1999, to star in the film L'ultimo volo.

== Filmography ==
| Year | Title | Role | Notes |
|---|---|---|---|
| 1958 | Toto in Paris | | |
| 1959 | Noi siamo due evasi | | |
| 1959 | La cambiale | Michelina | |
| 1960 | I baccanali di Tiberio | Flavinia | |
| 1960 | Death of a Friend | Wanda | |
| 1960 | Tu che ne dici? | The Woman dancing with Gangster 'Baby Little' | |
| 1961 | The Lovemakers | Boarder | |
| 1961 | Vanina Vanini | La femme de chambre | |
| 1961 | Gli attendenti | | |
| 1961 | The Two Marshals | Immacolata di Rosa | |
| 1961 | His Women | Claretta | |
| 1963 | 8½ | Olimpia - la prima ragazza provinata | Uncredited |
| 1963 | The Leopard | Mariannina | |
| 1964 | The Thursday | Olimpia | |
| 1964 | Two Mafiamen in the Far West | Calamity Jane | |
| 1964 | What Ever Happened to Baby Toto? | | |
| 1965 | Salome '73 | | |
| 1965 | Letti sbagliati | Dina | (segment "La seconda moglie") (final film role) |
