= Te lo leggo negli occhi =

- Directed by: Camillo Mastrocinque
- Written by: Carlo Lombardi; Gino Stafford
- Starring: Agnès Spaak; Dino; Nino Taranto
- Cinematography: Giuseppe Aquari
- Edited by: Gisa Radicchi Levi
- Music by: Guido Relly
- Distributed by: Variety Distribution
- Release date: 1965
- Running time: 103 minutes
- Country: Italy
- Language: Italian

Te lo leggo negli occhi is a 1965 Italian musicarello film directed by Camillo Mastrocinque. The film is based on the Dino's song with the same name.

== Cast ==
- Agnès Spaak as Serenella
- Dino as Dino
- Nino Taranto as Gennaro
- Mario Pisu as Dino's Father
- Tecla Scarano as Filomena
- Anna Campori as Elsa
- Vittorio Congia as Fred
- Giacomo Furia as Tino
- Mariangela Giordano as Rita
- Edy Biagetti as Valerio
- Eleonora Bianchi as Dorothy
- Andreina Paul
- Attilio Dottesio
- Gianni Dei
- Valentino Macchi
- Carlo Taranto
