= When Naples Sings =

When Naples Sings (Italian: Napoli che canta) may refer to:

- When Naples Sings (1926 film), a film by Roberto Roberti
- When Naples Sings (1930 film), a film by Mario Almirante
- Napoli che canta, a 2004 album by Giuni Russo
