= The Most Beautiful Couple in the World =

- Directed by: Camillo Mastrocinque
- Written by: Marcello Marchesi; Vittorio Metz
- Produced by: Luigi Rotundo; Mara Blasetti
- Starring: Walter Chiari; Paola Quattrini; Aldo Giuffrè
- Cinematography: Benito Frattari
- Edited by: Tomassina Tedeschi
- Music by: Gigi Cichellero
- Production company: Genesio Productions
- Distributed by: Titanus
- Release date: 26 January 1968
- Running time: 85 minutes
- Country: Italy
- Language: Italian

The Most Beautiful Couple in the World (Italian: La più bella coppia del mondo) is a 1968 Italian "musicarello" comedy film directed by Camillo Mastrocinque and starring Walter Chiari, Paola Quattrini and Aldo Giuffrè.

== Cast ==
- Walter Chiari as Walter
- Paola Quattrini as Paola
- Aldo Giuffrè as Turiddu
- Francesco Mulè as Commendatore Gennaroni
- Elio Pandolfi as Radiocronista
- Gianni Agus as Gianni
- José Greci as Sign. Gennaroni
- Margaret Rose Keil as Ingrid
- Pinuccio Ardia as Avvocato di Gennaroni
- Giancarlo Bonuglia
- Pino Caruso as Carmelo Miccichè
- Maria Grazia Marescalchi as Giornalista Quagliotti
- Mariella Palmich as Nunziatina
- Nino Segurini as Roberto
- Giulio Tomasini
- Gabrio Gabrani as Giancarlo, il paparazzo
- Rita Pavone as Self
- Bobby Solo as Self
- Patty Pravo as Self
- Dino as Self
- Wilma Goich as Self
- Carmelo Pagano as Self
- Ricky Shayne as Self
- Nicola Di Bari as Self
- Massimo Ranieri as Self
- Pilade as Self
- Nomadi as Themselves
- Adriano Celentano as Self
- Demetrio Stratos as Self
- Alfonso Giganti as Photographer
- Giuseppe Marrocco as Journalist in Messina
- Oscar Sciamanna as Photographer in Messina

== Bibliography ==
- Peter Cowie. World Filmography 1968. Tantivy Press, 1968.
