= Lo smemorato di Collegno =

- Directed by: Sergio Corbucci
- Written by: Bruno Corbucci; Giovanni Grimaldi
- Produced by: Gianni Buffardi
- Starring: Totò; Nino Taranto; Erminio Macario
- Cinematography: Enzo Barboni
- Edited by: Giuliana Attenni
- Music by: Piero Piccioni
- Release date: 1962
- Country: Italy
- Language: Italian

Lo smemorato di Collegno (Italian for "The Collegno amnesiac") is a 1962 commedia all'italiana film directed by Sergio Corbucci. It is loosely based on the Bruneri-Canella case.

== Plot ==
A man is hospitalized in a neurological clinic, due to a memory loss. After the publication of his photography on a newspaper three people claim to have recognized him: Miss Ballarini and Miss Polacich, who both claim that he is their husband, and a fraudster, who accuses the amnesiac of being his disappeared accomplice.

== Cast ==
- Totò: The Amnesiac
- Nino Taranto: Professor Ademaro Gioberti
- Erminio Macario: Nicola Politi
- Aroldo Tieri: Dr. Alessandro Zannini
- Andrea Checchi: Lawyer Rossetti
- Yvonne Sanson: Linda Ballarini
- Franco Volpi: Prosecutor
- Mario Pisu: Ballarini's Lawyer
- Elvy Lissiak: Miss Polacich
- Riccardo Billi: Fernando Meniconi
- Enrico Viarisio: Minister
- Franco Giacobini: Journalist
- Gisella Sofio: Milanese Journalist
- Pietro Carloni: Francesco Ballerini
- Mario Castellani: Giorgio Ballerini
- Consalvo Dell'Arti: Natale
- Gianni Rizzo: Accountant
- Antonio Acqua: President of the Tribunal
- Mimmo Poli: Man-Bench
- Franco Ressel: Publicist
