= La cambiale =

1959 Italian comedy film

- Directed by: Camillo Mastrocinque
- Written by: Luigi Magni, Vittorio Metz, Roberto Gianviti
- Produced by: Franco Palaggi
- Starring: Totò, Peppino De Filippo, Ugo Tognazzi, Vittorio Gassman, Aroldo Tieri, Sandra Mondaini, Raimondo Vianello
- Cinematography: Alvaro Mancori
- Music by: Carlo Innocenzi
- Release date: 1959
- Running time: 105 min
- Country: Italy
- Language: Italian

La cambiale is a 1959 Italian comedy film directed by Camillo Mastrocinque.

== Plot ==
Commander Bruscatelli, before being imprisoned, leaves the Posalaquaglia cousins a bill of exchange which they give to Temistocle Bisogni in compensation for the damage they have committed in his tobacco shop. This letter undergoes opposition, passes from hand to hand before returning to Bisogni who passes it to Posalaquaglia in exchange for false testimony. The two are arrested and find Bruscatelli, who renews the bill of exchange with another equivalent.

== Cast ==
- Totò: Antonio Posalaquaglia
- Peppino De Filippo: Peppino Posalaquaglia
- Macario: Tommaso La Candida
- Vittorio Gassman: Michele, the "coiffeur pour chien"
- Sylva Koscina: Odette Mercury
- Ugo Tognazzi: Alfredo Balzarini
- Georgia Moll: Maria, Ottavio's sister
- Raimondo Vianello: Olimpio
- Paolo Ferrari: Ottavio
- Aroldo Tieri: commendator Pierluigi Bruscatelli
- Lia Zoppelli: la proprietaria della Ilaria boutique
- Luigi Pavese: cavalier/il padrone di casa Temistocle Bisogni
- Toni Ucci: Manager of Ursus
- Andrea Bosic: Prince Alessio
- Olimpia Cavalli: Enrichetta
- Gina Rovere: Lola Capponi
- Mario Castellani: lawyer Incarta
- Eduardo Passarelli: il pretore
- Giacomo Furia: il cancelliere
- Clara Auteri: the Dressmaker
