= Toto and Cleopatra =

- Directed by: Fernando Cerchio
- Written by: Bruno Corbucci; Giovanni Grimaldi; Fernando Cerchio
- Starring: Totò; Magali Noël
- Cinematography: Alvaro Mancori
- Music by: Carlo Rustichelli
- Release date: 1963
- Running time: 95 minutes
- Country: Italy
- Language: Italian

Toto and Cleopatra (Italian: Totò e Cleopatra) is a 1963 Italian adventure-comedy film written and directed by Fernando Cerchio.

== Plot ==
Mark Antony has a brother-lookalike, Totonno, a sinister slave trader. Totonno secretly replaces Mark Antony in the most delicate moments. The continuous alternation of the two brothers generates havoc, with Cleopatra increasingly confused about the contradictory behavior of the man.

== Cast ==
- Totò as Totonno / Mark Antony
- Magali Noël as Cleopatra
- Franco Sportelli as Ahenobarbus
- Carlo Delle Piane as Caesarion
- Moira Orfei as Octavia
- Lia Zoppelli as Fulvia
- Gianni Agus as Senator Gaius Octavius
- Toni Ucci as Senator Publio Nasone
- Mario Castellani as Real Surgeon
- Pietro Carloni as Lepidus
- Nadine Sanders as Ancella di Cleopatra
- Ignazio Leone as Apollodoro
- Adriana Facchetti as Publia
- Franco Ressel as the Sicilian
- Dada Gallotti as Carmiana
