= La ragazzola =

- Directed by: Giuseppe Orlandini
- Written by: Ottavio Alessi; Ugo Guerra
- Music by: Romano Mussolini
- Release date: 1965
- Running time: 90 minutes
- Country: Italy
- Language: Italian

La ragazzola is a 1965 Italian film directed by Giuseppe Orlandini.

== Cast ==
- Agnès Spaak as Lola
- Giuliano Gemma as Raoul
- Gabriella Giorgelli as Ines
- Angelo Infanti as Alberto
- Paola Borboni as Elvira
- Margaret Lee as Adriana
- Roberto De Simone as The Wizard
- Sandro Dori as Fabrizio
- Armando Carini
- Anna Lina Alberti
- Libero Grandi
- Lamberto Antinori
- Dony Baster
