= His Women =

1961 film

- Film poster
- Directed by: Ugo Tognazzi
- Written by: Giulio Scarnicci; Renzo Tarabusi; Luciano Salce
- Produced by: Aldo Calamara; Achille Filo
- Starring: Ugo Tognazzi
- Cinematography: Marco Scarpelli
- Edited by: Franco Fraticelli
- Music by: Armando Trovajoli
- Release date: 26 December 1961
- Running time: 96 minutes
- Country: Italy
- Language: Italian

His Women (Italian: Il mantenuto) is a 1961 Italian comedy film directed by and starring Ugo Tognazzi. It was shown as part of a retrospective on Italian comedy at the 67th Venice International Film Festival.

== Cast ==
- Ugo Tognazzi as Stefano Garbelli
- Ilaria Occhini as Daniela
- Mario Carotenuto as Losi
- Marisa Merlini as Amalia
- Pinuccia Nava
- Armando Bandini
- Raimondo Vianello
- Aldo Berti
- Mario Castellani
- Margarete Robsahm as Carla
- Olimpia Cavalli
- Consalvo Dell'Arti
- Vera Gambaccioni
- Renato Mambor
- Arrigo Peri
- Massimo Righi
- Gianni Musy
- Franco Giacobini
- Franco Ressel
