= Soldati e capelloni =

- Directed by: Ettore Maria Fizzarotti
- Screenplay by: Augusto Caminito; Giovanni Grimaldi
- Produced by: Franco Cittadini; Stenio Fiorentini
- Cinematography: Riccardo Pallottini
- Edited by: Franco Fraticelli
- Music by: Gian Franco Reverberi
- Production company: Mega Cinematografica
- Release date: 1967
- Running time: 97 min
- Country: Italy

Soldati e capelloni is a 1967 Italian "musicarello" black comedy film directed by Ettore Maria Fizzarotti, written by Augusto Caminito and Giovanni Grimaldi, produced by Franco Cittadini and Stenio Fiorentini and starred by Franco Lantieri, Brizio Montinari, Peppino de Filippo, Lia Zoppelli, Valeria Fabrizi, Patrizia Valturri, Valentino Macchi and Franco Giacobini.

== Cast ==
- Patrizia Valturri as Lina
- Valeria Fabrizi as Concetta Sciortino
- Franco Lantieri as Rocco Sciortino
- Brizio Montinaro as Cola Sciortino
- Lia Zoppelli as Dolores
- Fiorenzo Fiorentini as Direttore del locale notturno
- Gianni Agus as Colonello Ortega
- Enzo Liberti as Il maggiore
- Aroldo Tieri as Sergente Alberto Caputo
- Luigi De Filippo as Mosca
- Franco Giacobini as Franco, the barber
- Valentino Macchi as Un commilitone
- Adriano Micantoni as the deputy
- Luciano Bonanni as Giardinier maggiordomo
- Carmelo Pagano Il cantante
- Rossella Bergamonti
- Lucia Righi
- Mario Mariani
- Dino Greco
- Giuseppe Rondinella
- Diana Bond as Andreina
- Wanda Cortese
- Peppino De Filippo as Peppino Pica
- Pietro De Vico
- Donato Di Sepio
