= Gianni Agus =

Italian actor (1917–1994)

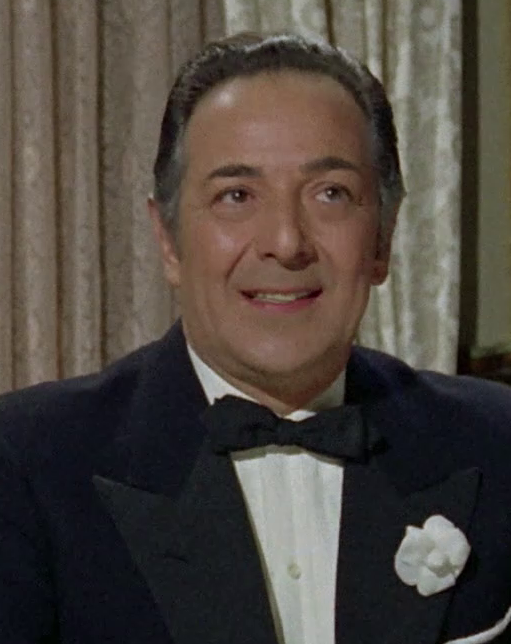
- Agus in Il lungo, il corto, il gatto (1967)
- Born: Giovanni Battista Agus; 17 August 1917; Cagliari, Italy
- Died: 4 March 1994 (aged 76); Rome, Italy
- Occupation: Actor
- Years active: 1938-1991

Gianni Agus (17 August 1917 – 4 March 1994) was an Italian actor with a career in film, television, and theatre since 1938. He appeared in more than 60 films between 1938 and 1991.

== Life and career ==
Born in Cagliari, Sardinia, after his diploma in accounting Agus moved to Rome to enroll in the Centro Sperimentale di Cinematografia, from which he graduated in 1938. The same year he made his screen debut in Carmine Gallone's The Life of Giuseppe Verdi and his stage debut with the Merlini-Cialente company.

Agus' career took off in the post-war period, with his participation in numerous revues and musical comedies, often working with Wanda Osiris. His popularity in the general public increased thanks to television, particularly with the hosting of the eighth edition of the Sanremo Music Festival, and later as the sidekick of comedians Peppino De Filippo and Paolo Villaggio on several TV shows.

== Partial filmography ==
- The Life of Giuseppe Verdi (1938)
- Inventiamo l'amore (1938) - Un invitato alla festa
- The Sons of the Marquis Lucera (1939)
- Naples Will Never Die (1939) - Bebè
- Io, suo padre (1939)
- His Young Wife (1945) - Velan
- Adam and Eve (1949) - Paride
- Femmina incatenata (1949) - Gianni
- Figaro Here, Figaro There (1950) - Il conte di Almaviva
- The Enchanting Enemy (1953)
- Funniest Show on Earth (1953) - Il signore dai capelli tinti di rosso (uncredited)
- Ci troviamo in galleria (1953) - Il lettore di pubblicità
- Verdi (1953) - (uncredited)
- It Takes Two to Sin in Love (1954)
- Cardinal Lambertini (1954) - Count Pepoli
- Giove in doppiopetto (1954)
- Susanna Whipped Cream (1957) - Trombetti
- Femmine tre volte (1957) - Marchese De Blasi
- La cento chilometri (1959) - Corsetti's Friend with a Bow Tie
- The Fascist (1961) - Capo del fascio di Cremona
- Pesci d'oro e bikini d'argento (1961)
- The Two Marshals (1961) - Podestà Pennica
- 2 samurai per 100 geishe (1962) - Avv. Sciabica
- I motorizzati (1962) - Mario
- Sexy Toto (1963) - Ispettore di dogana
- Uno strano tipo (1963) - Gastone
- Toto vs. the Four (1963) - Dottor Cavallo (uncredited)
- Divorzio alla siciliana (1963) - L'avvocato
- Le motorizzate (1963) - The Prosecutor (segment "Il Vigile Ignoto")
- Toto and Cleopatra (1963) - Ottavio
- Europa: Operazione Strip-tease (1964)
- The Climax (1967) - Un presentatore televisivo
- Il lungo, il corto, il gatto (1967) - Il conte
- Soldati e capelloni (1967) - Colonello Ortega
- Peggio per me... meglio per te (1967) - Barone Marcianò
- The Most Beautiful Couple in the World (1968) - Gianni
- La vuole lui... lo vuole lei (1968)
- Franco e Ciccio... Ladro e Guardia (1969) - Naked man in airport
- Lisa dagli occhi blu (1970) - Centro Spaziale Engineer
- Il gatto di Brooklyn aspirante detective (1973) - Aldemiro Arcangelo Gabriele De Porcaris
- Ku-Fu? Dalla Sicilia con furore (1973) - Kon Ki Lay
- Dirty Weekend (1973) - Sergio
- 4 marmittoni alle grandi manovre (1974) - Il colonnello
- Il colonnello Buttiglione diventa generale (1974) - Generale La Tanica
- Il trafficone (1974) - on. Rivolta
- The Balloon Vendor (1974) - Circus Manager
- Buttiglione diventa capo del servizio segreto (1975) - Generale La Tanica
- Due sul pianerottolo (1976) - Dott. Gianni Tagliolini
- My Sister in Law (1976) - Angelo Scotti
- Orazi e curiazi 3-2 (1977) - Mezio
- Fracchia la belva umana (1981) - Dott. Orimbelli
- Culo e camicia (1981) - Annibale Panebianco
- I carabbimatti (1981) - Giuseppe Marrone
- Camera d'albergo (1981) - Himself
- Sbirulino (1982) - Brescioni
- Cuando calienta el sol... vamos a la playa (1982)
- Questo e Quello (1983) - Editor (segment "Questo... amore impossibile")
- Matilda (1990) - Matilda's Father

=== TV ===
- Il conte di Montecristo (1966)
- La granduchessa e i camerieri, dir. Gino Landi (1977)
- Bambole non c'è una lira, dir. Antonello Falqui (1977)
- Giochiamo al varieté (1980)
- Tamburi nella notte, dir. Gabriele Lavia (1982)
- Senator, dir. Gianfrancesco Lazotti (1992)
