= The Fighting Men (1950 film) =

1950 Italian melodrama film

- Directed by: Camillo Mastrocinque; Roberto Savarese
- Written by: Gian Paolo Callegari (writer); Lewis E. Ciannelli (adaptation); Enrico Colombo (story); G.G. Loschiavo (story); Gisella Mathess (writer); Vittorio Nino Novarese (writer); Fulvio Palmieri (writer); Jacques Remy (writer)
- Produced by: Alan Curtis; Alberto Salvatori
- Cinematography: Gábor Pogány
- Music by: Enzo Masetti
- Release date: 1 November 1950
- Running time: 97 minutes (Italy); 85 minutes (France)
- Countries: Italy; France
- Language: Italian

The Fighting Men (Italian: Gli inesorabili) is a 1950 Italian melodrama film directed by Camillo Mastrocinque and Roberto Savarese.

== Cast ==
- Rossano Brazzi as Saro Costa
- Charles Vanel as Don Salvatore Sparaino
- Claudine Dupuis as Stellina Luparello
- Milly Vitale as Elena Occhipinti
- Eduardo Ciannelli as Barone Occhipinti
- Turi Pandolfini
- Ignazio Balsamo as Ciro Sollima
- Carla Calò as Rosa
