= Elvy Lissiak =

Italian actress (1929–1996)

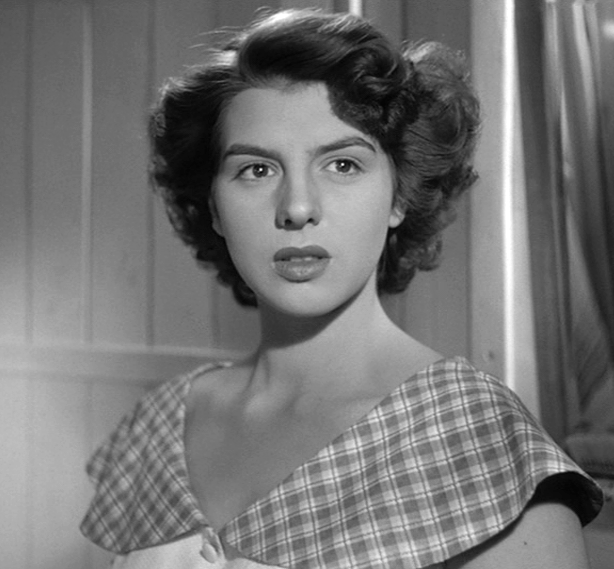
- Lissiak in the movie Domenica d'agosto (1950)
- Born: Elvira Lissiak; 19 July 1929; Trieste, Kingdom of Italy
- Died: 25 February 1996 (aged 66); Rome, Italy
- Occupation: Actress

Elvy Lissiak (19 July 1929 – 25 February 1996) was an Italian stage and film actress.

== Life and career ==
Born in Trieste, Italy, as Elvira Lissiak, she made her film debut with the role of Luciana in Luciano Emmer's Domenica d'agosto (1950), gaining critical appreciation for her performance. Lissiak later appeared on stage in a rivista with Ugo Tognazzi and in several films alongside Vittorio Gassman, at the time her partner in life. Following the breakup of her relationship with Gassman, she decided to focus her activities on stage, where she knew her then husband, the actor Franco Castellani. She retired from acting in the early 1960s.

== Filmography ==
Year	Title	Role	Notes
1950	Sunday in August	Luciana	
1950	Toto Looks for a Wife	Adelina	
1950	Hawk of the Nile	Selika	Uncredited
1950	The Lion of Amalfi	Diana	
1951	Trieste mia!		
1952	Guilt Is Not Mine	Barbara Soldani	
1953	The Ship of Condemned Women	Carmen	
1960	Labbra rosse	Baby's Sister	
1960	From a Roman Balcony		
1961	The Two Marshals	Vanda	
1962	Hawk of the Caribbean	Lolita	
1962	Lo smemorato di Collegno	Wife of Polacic	(final film role)
