= Guilt Is Not Mine =

1952 film

- French film poster
- Directed by: Giuseppe Masini
- Written by: Siro Angeli; Giuseppe Masini; Rodolfo Gentile; Luigi Giacosi
- Produced by: Luigi Nannerini
- Starring: Rossano Brazzi; Gaby André; Elvy Lissiak
- Cinematography: Augusto Tiezzi
- Edited by: Otello Colangeli
- Music by: Alessandro Cicognini
- Production company: Electron Film
- Distributed by: Zeus Film
- Release date: 28 November 1952
- Running time: 90 minutes
- Countries: France; Italy
- Language: Italian

Guilt Is Not Mine or Unjust Condemnation (French: L'injuste condamnation, Italian: L'ingiusta condanna) is a 1952 French-Italian melodrama film co-written and directed by Giuseppe Masini and starring Rossano Brazzi, Gaby André and Elvy Lissiak.

== Plot ==
We are in Maremma. A doctor who devotes himself to scientific research falls in love with Anna, the daughter of a chemist, who does not approve of the relationship. He is thus courted by other women, among which Barbara proves to be the most enterprising: meanwhile Anna gets engaged and the young doctor begins to suffer. When a malaria epidemic breaks out, the scientist is accused of not thinking about healing the locals to continue scientific experiments, undergoes a trial and ends up in prison.

== Cast ==
- Rossano Brazzi as Carlo Rocchi
- Gaby André as Anna Valli
- Sergio Tofano as Prof. Valli
- Elvy Lissiak as Barbara Soldani
- Umberto Sacripante as Dante
- Mino Doro as Archeologo
- Fedele Gentile as Ferri
- Ubaldo Lay as Andrea
- Amedeo Trilli as Sindaco
- Gianna Segale as Gianna
- Guido Riccioli as Oste
- Nanda Primavera as Ostessa
- Enzo Staiola
