= Giacomo Furia =

Italian actor (1925–2015)

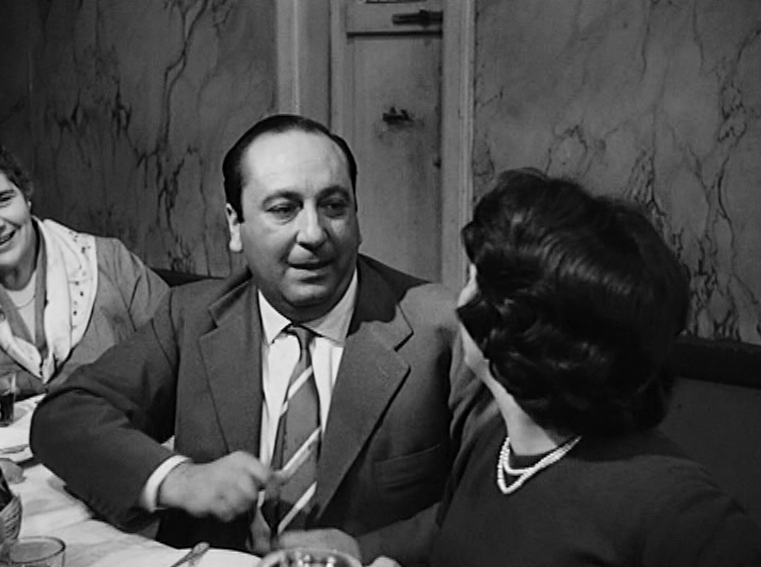
- Furia in My Wife's Enemy (1959)
- Born: Giacomo Matteo Furia; 2 January 1925; Arienzo, Kingdom of Italy
- Died: 5 June 2015 (aged 90); Rome, Italy
- Occupation: Actor
- Years active: 1948–1998

Giacomo Matteo Furia (2 January 1925 – 5 June 2015) was an Italian film, television and stage actor. He appeared in more than 130 films between 1948 and 1998.

== Life and career ==
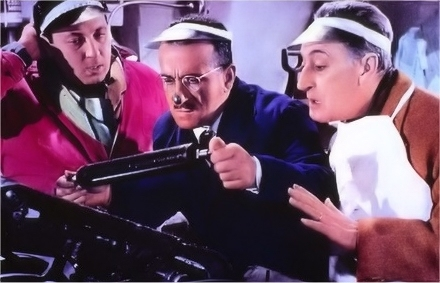
Giacomo Furia with Peppino De Filippo and Totò in The Band of Honest Men (1956)

Born in Arienzo, near Caserta, Furia started his acting career thanks to Eduardo De Filippo, he had met through an after-school summer job; he made his professional debut on stage in 1945, in De Filippo's Napoli milionaria. He made his film debut three years later, in Mario Mattoli's Assunta Spina; mainly cast in character roles, he was often a sidekick of Totò, notably landing a major role in The Band of Honest Men. His credits include films directed by Federico Fellini, Vittorio De Sica, Roberto Rossellini and Francesco Rosi. In 1997 Furia released an autobiography written in collaboration with Michele Avitabile, Le maggiorate, il principe e l'ultimo degli onesti. He died on 5 June 2015, aged 90.

== Selected filmography ==
- Assunta Spina (1948) – Tittariello
- The Bride Can't Wait (1949) – Giovanni
- Toto Looks for a House (1949) – Pasquale Saluto
- Little Lady (1949) – Il meccanico napoletano
- Snow White and the Seven Thieves (1949)
- L'inafferrabile 12 (1950) – Il maresciallo
- Totò Tarzan (1950) – The Cook
- Toto the Sheik (1950) – Un legionario
- Variety Lights (1950) – Duke
- Arrivano i nostri (1951) – L'automobilista
- O.K. Nerone (1951) – Harbinger
- Il microfono è vostro (1951) – Guardia notturna
- The Dream of Zorro (1952) – Panchito
- The Machine to Kill Bad People (1952) – Romano Cuccurullo
- Good Folk's Sunday (1953) – Passante allo stadio (uncredited)
- Neapolitan Turk (1953) – Prison guard (uncredited)
- Two Nights with Cleopatra (1954) – Mercante (uncredited)
- A Slice of Life (1954) – (segment "Don Corradino")
- Modern Virgin (1954) – Un commesso
- The Cheerful Squadron (1954) – The Corporal
- The Doctor of the Mad (1954) – Michele
- Prima di sera (1954) – Alberto Belli – the chemist
- The Gold of Naples (1954) – Rosario - marito di Sofia (segment "Pizze a credito")
- Tears of Love (1954)
- Tragic Ballad (1954) – Vigile urbano
- Too Bad She's Bad (1954) – Luigi
- The Art of Getting Along (1955) – Maggiordomo di Sasà
- Toto in Hell (1955)
- Sins of Casanova (1955)
- Suonno d'ammore (1955)
- Are We Men or Corporals? (1955)
- La rossa (1955) – Giacomo
- The Two Friends (1955) – Vincenzo, il sarto
- L'ultimo amante (1955) – Il nuovo inquilino
- Destination Piovarolo (1955) – Il segretario de De Fassi
- The Best Part (1955) – Le gérant de la cantine
- Una sera di maggio (1955)
- The Band of Honest Men (1956) – Cardone
- I giorni più belli (1956) – L'addetto al trenino del Luna Park
- Peccato di castità (1956)
- Saranno uomini (1956)
- Susanna Whipped Cream (1957)
- Marisa (1957)
- Primo applauso (1957)
- Peppino, le modelle e chella là (1957) – Giacomino
- Onore e sangue (1957) – Gegè – Arturo's friend
- A sud niente di nuovo (1957)
- Amore a prima vista (1958) – Clemente
- È arrivata la parigina (1958) – Vincenzino
- Adorable and a Liar (1958) – Primo Fiorenzi
- Toto, Peppino and the Fanatics (1958) – Man Cousin of Giovanni
- Angel in a Taxi (1958) – Pasticciere
- Toto in the Moon (1958) – Il Commedator Santoni
- Non sono più Guaglione (1958) – Don Salvatore – the shoemaker
- Arriva la banda (1959)
- Toto in Madrid (1959) – Tobia
- Venetian Honeymoon (1959) – Stanislas dit Stan
- Pensione Edelweiss (1959) – Le ténor
- Prepotenti più di prima (1959) – Il dottore
- My Wife's Enemy (1959) – Peppino
- Lui, lei e il nonno (1959)
- The Thieves (1959) – Vincenzo Scognamiglio
- Ragazzi del Juke-Box (1959) – Gennarino
- La cambiale (1959) – The Clerk to the Court (uncredited)
- Ferdinando I, re di Napoli (1959) – Ciccillo
- Spavaldi e innamorati (1959)
- Guardatele ma non toccatele (1959) – Edoardo Capuano
- Avventura in città (1959)
- Howlers in the Dock (1960) – L'onorevole Gubellini
- Il carro armato dell'8 settembre (1960)
- Sweet Deceptions (1960) – Negoziante
- Il corazziere (1960) – Macchione
- Sanremo – La grande sfida (1960)
- I Teddy boys della canzone (1960) – Funzionario RAI
- Akiko (1961) – Peppe
- Come September (1961) – Poliziotto (uncredited)
- The Last Judgment (1961)
- Black City (1961) – Il ministro Califano
- Ursus in the Valley of the Lions (1961) – Simud
- Che femmina!! E... che dollari! (1961)
- Pugni, pupe e marinai (1961) – RAI Porter
- Boccaccio '70 (1962) – Worker (segment "Le tentazioni del dottor Antonio") (uncredited)
- Colpo gobbo all'italiana (1962) – Brigadier
- La leggenda di Fra Diavolo (1962)
- Lo sgarro (1962)
- Uno strano tipo (1963) – Direttore dell'hotel
- The Monk of Monza (1963) – Cecco, un bravo
- I terribili 7 (1963) – Appaltatore
- Toto vs. the Black Pirate (1964) – Don Carlos d'Aragona
- L'ultima carica (1964)
- Devil of the Desert Against the Son of Hercules (1964) – Salene
- Backfire (1964) – Nino (uncredited)
- La traite des blanches (1965)
- La donnaccia (1965)
- La vedovella (1965) – Gennarino
- Te lo leggo negli occhi (1965) – Tino
- Non son degno di te (1965) – Sergeant Gargiulo
- Baraka (1966)
- Monnaie de singe (1966)
- That Man George (1966)
- Sharp-Shooting Twin Sisters (1966)
- Maigret and His Greatest Case (1966) – Marcello Genaro
- More Than a Miracle (1967)
- Fantabulous Inc. (1967)
- Vacanze sulla Costa Smeralda (1968) – Accountant
- Zum Zum Zum – La canzone che mi passa per la testa (1969) – Pasquale
- Il ragazzo che sorride (1969) – Barman
- Ms. Stiletto (1969) – Rudolph
- And God Said to Cain (1970) – Juanito
- Mr. Superinvisible (1970)
- La ragazza del prete (1970) – Il sacrestano
- L'interrogatorio (1970)
- Io non spezzo... rompo (1971) – Policeman from Naples
- Il furto è l'anima del commercio!?... (1971) – Commissario Mammone
- Boccaccio (1972)
- Where the Bullets Fly (1972)
- Sans sommation (1973) – Le commissaire
- My Pleasure Is Your Pleasure (1973) – Il vescovo di Coira
- Special Killers (1973) – Bartender
- Provaci anche tu Lionel (1973)
- Adolescence pervertie (1974)
- Commissariato di notturna (1974, also screenwriter) – Il brigadiere Santini
- La cameriera (1974) – Doctor
- The Balloon Vendor (1974) – Male Nurse
- Substitute Teacher (1975) – Il preside
- The Adolescent (1976) – Il notaio
- A Common Sense of Modesty (1976) – Lattanzi / Direttore di produzione del film Lady Chatterley / Production director of the film Lady Chatterley
- La linea del fiume (1976) – Il medico
- Death Rage (1976) – Brigadiere Cannavale
- La compagna di banco (1977) – Commissario Acavallo
- L'amour chez les poids lourds (1978)
- The Payoff (1978) – Antonio
- Pugni, dollari e spinaci (1978) – Stilo's Lawyer
- Bactron 317 ou L'espionne qui venait du show (1979)
- Il lupo e l'agnello (1980)
- Girls Will Be Girls (1980) – Pasquarelli
- Lulù 77 (1980)
- L'onorevole con l'amante sotto il letto (1981) – Zio Efisio
- Crime at the Chinese Restaurant (1981) – judge Enrico Arducci
- Vediamoci chiaro (1984) – Peppino
- C'è posto per tutti (1990) – Caposquadra Disoccupati
- Ci hai rotto papà (1993)
- Senza amore (2007) – Il Prete
- No Problem (2008) – Galeazzo
