= Sexy Toto =

- Directed by: Mario Amendola
- Written by: Bruno Corbucci; Giovanni Grimaldi
- Produced by: Mario Mariani
- Starring: Totò
- Cinematography: Alessandro D'Eva
- Edited by: Jolanda Benvenuti
- Music by: Armando Trovajoli
- Production companies: Cinex; Incei Film
- Distributed by: Incei Film
- Release date: 5 September 1963
- Running time: 100 minutes
- Country: Italy
- Language: Italian

Sexy Toto (Italian: Totòsexy) is a 1963 Italian comedy film directed by Mario Amendola and starring Totò and Erminio Macario. It consisted of a mere montage of scenes discarded from Toto's First Night. It attracted around 880,000 spectators, considerably less than usual for a Totò film.

== Plot ==
After being arrested for criminal activities, two street musicians swap sexy stories with the other inmates.

== Cast ==
- Totò as Nini Cantachiaro
- Erminio Macario as Mimi Cocco
- Mario Castellani as Guardia carceraria
- Gianni Agus as Ispettore di dogana
- Mario Pisu as L'impresario
- Mimmo Poli as Un galeotto - inmate #1
- Franco Giacobini as Un galeotti
- Gianni Baghino
- Andrea Scandurra as Un galeotte
- Franca Polesello
- Kitty Merrel
- Bruno Scipioni
- Pasquale De Filippo as Un galeotti
- Carmen Aul
- Dodo' D'Amburg as Exotic dancer
- Laa Baghera
- Giselle Faure
- Ya Doucheskaya as Exotic dancer
- Kristian Ganganar
- Corinne Fontaine
- Gisella Ferrini as herself, a singer
- Daphne Wollaston as Dancer
- Ester Masing as Dancer
- Maureen Warrick as Dancer
- Karin Meyer as Dancer
- Marie Stuart as Dancer
- Yona Aretti as Dancer
- Gina Sampieri as Dancer
- Franca Licastro as Dancer
- Gianni Morandi as himself
- Nando Angelini
- C. Medici Bachino
- Linda Sini as Hostess
- Toni Ucci
- Ronne Aul as Dancer

== Bibliography ==
- Ennio Bìspuri. Totò: principe clown : tutti i film di Totò. Guida Editori, 1997.
