= Dr. Orloff's Monster =

- Directed by: Jesús Franco
- Screenplay by: Jesús Franco
- Story by: Jesús Franco
- Starring: Agnès Spaak; José Rubio; Perla Cristal; Pastor Serrador
- Cinematography: Alfonso Nieva
- Edited by: Ángel Serrano
- Music by: Daniel J. White
- Production company: Leo Films
- Distributed by: Nueva Films
- Release date: 12 October 1965 (Las Palmas)
- Running time: 92 minutes
- Country: Spain

Dr. Orloff's Monster (Spanish: El secreto del doctor Orloff) is a 1965 film directed by Jesús Franco. It was made as a follow-up to the box office success of The Awful Dr. Orloff (1962). It was first announced in 1962, and shot between January 26, 1964, and lasted until March 28 in Spain.

The film had distribution problems, being released in 1965 in Spain.

== Plot ==
Melissa, a young teenager, travels from her small town in Austria with Juan Manuel, a young man who flirts with her, to the mansion of her uncles Dr. Conrad Fisherman and Inglud to spend Christmas. Melissa's father, Andros Fisherman, died mysteriously at the home of his brother Conrad some time ago. Now the young woman has just come of age and Conrad intends to give her the inheritance. Upon arriving at the mansion, the young woman is greeted by the servant Cicero and meets her aunt Inglud who is an alcoholic. Later, she meets her uncle Conrad in the laboratory where the Doctor is developing a sinister experiment. Dr. Orloff, in a delicate state of health, revealed his knowledge about the use of mind control and ultrasound resuscitation to Dr. Fisherman. Melissa wants to obtain information about her father's death but is met with evasiveness by Conrad and Inglud.

Later it is revealed that Andros and Inglud had a love affair. The doctor, overcome with jealousy and rage and killed Andros. With the knowledge of Dr. Orloff, Conrad manages to reanimate his dead brother and turn Andros into a 'robot' who kills women. However, Andros's reanimated body also seems to sense the presence of his daughter in the house, and begins to act on its own, outside the doctor's control.

With several murders to solve, Inspector Klein is appointed to solve the mystery, but his investigations are fruitless. It is Dr. Orloff who puts the police on the trail of his colleague. In the mansion, Inglud dies from the shock of seeing her lover revived. The doctor tries to kill Melissa, but Andros kills him before he can complete his murder. Despite saving his life, Melissa agrees to act as bait so that the police can capture and kill Andros.

== Cast ==
- Agnès Spaak as Melisa
- Hugo Blanco as Andros/Albert Fihsesrman
- José Rubio as Juan Manuel
- Perla Cristal as Rosa, the cabaret singer
- Pastor Serrador as Commissioner Klein

== Production ==
Dr. Orloff's Monster's was produced by Leo Films, based in Madrid. The film was developed to exploit and replicate the box office success of The Awful Dr. Orloff (1962). It was initially made with he title of Robot in November 1962, and financed by Claude Makovski when the previous film was screened in Paris. Director Jesús Franco wrote the script and story himself, despite the Spanish print crediting Nicole Guettard on the film prints.

In an interview published in 1991, Franco said he could not get Howard Vernon to play the role of Professor Fisherman as he could not afford Vernon's salary, let alone his airplane ticket. Years later, Franco alternatively said it would have been wrong to use the actor, saying for the role he wanted something "dirtier, something "lower.""

Shooting began on January 26, 1964 and lasted until March 28. The film was shot in Aranjuez, El Escorial, San Martín de Valdeiglesias, Alcalá de Henares, Barajas, and Guadarrama. While filming at Castillo de Alconchel, the castle's second flat floor collapsed under the feet of make-up artists Pilar Echevarría, who suffered consequences so severe that Franco said "She never fully really recovered."

== Release ==
In June 1964, Leo Films sold the rights to Dr. Orloff's Monster to distributor Nueva Films. The Madrid-based Compañía Cinematográfica Exportadora took care of foreign sales. Film historians Francesco Cesari and Roberto Curti described the film as having troubled release in Spain, with no release in Madrid, and being distributed by Valencia by Viuda de José Mateu, an obscure one-man distributor that covered the Eastern region of Spain. The two authors said a screening had allegedly happened in Oviedo at Cine Campoamor on January 16, 1965, while other screenings happened on October 12, 1965, in Las Palmas in the Canary Islands.

The film was released abroad, including in France on January 16, 1966, as Les Maîtresses du Docteur Jekyll. Franco was adamant about how he disliked the title, saying it was a "crazy idea" and he "didn't think it's a good title. It would have been more successful if we had called it 'Orloff.'" The French version of the film was also released in Ottawa, Canada at Cinéma de Paris. It was released in the United States on television in English as Dr. Orloff's Monster on April 3, 1966.

Dr. Orloff’s Monster was released on blu-ray on February 7, 2017.

== Reception ==
The Madrid-based newspaper El mundo deportivo described the film as "the best film helmed by Jesús Franco" comparing the film to the work of Orson Welles stating the Franco's admiration of the director is patent, 80% of the film being shot in the same style as Welles' The Trial (1962).
