= Il mio amico Benito =

- Directed by: Giorgio Bianchi
- Written by: Amleto Nobili; Luigi Magni; Stefano Strucchi; Oreste Biancoli; Giorgio Bianchi; Marino Girolami; Steno; Dino Risi
- Cinematography: Tino Santoni
- Music by: Armando Trovajoli
- Release date: 1962
- Language: Italian

Il mio amico Benito is a 1962 commedia all'italiana film directed by Giorgio Bianchi.

== Plot ==
Peppino Di Gennaro is a simple clerk who wants to make a career without success. After a friend gave him a photo taken during the First World War that shows him together with Benito Mussolini, he tries to take advantage of it getting an invitation from Duce, but the OVRA stops him every time. After numerous failed attempts he eventually succeeds in entering his office in the exact moment Mussolini was on the balcony announcing the Italian entry into the war; disappointed and embittered, Peppino goes away destroying the photo.

== Cast ==
- Peppino De Filippo: Giuseppe Di Gennaro
- Didi Perego: Italia
- Mario Carotenuto: Mariani
- Andrea Checchi: Commissioner
- Emma Gramatica: Giuseppe's Mother
- Mac Ronay: Landolfi
- Luigi De Filippo: Fioretti
- Carlo Pisacane: Signor Arturo
- Riccardo Billi: Renzi
- Ciccio Barbi: Sor Achille
- Luigi Pavese: Pieroni
- Franco Giacobini: Liberati
- Giuseppe Porelli: Capo divisione
- Franco Franchi: Terrorist
- Ciccio Ingrassia: Terrorist
- Tiberio Murgia: Policeman
- Alberto Rabagliati: Himself
