= The Lady Doctor =

- Directed by: Camillo Mastrocinque
- Written by: Vittorio Metz; Marcello Marchesi; Marino Onorati
- Starring: Totò; Vittorio De Sica; Abbe Lane
- Cinematography: Gábor Pogány
- Music by: Carlo Innocenzi
- Release date: 1957
- Running time: 98 min
- Country: Italy
- Language: Italian

The Lady Doctor (Italian: Totò, Vittorio e la dottoressa, also known as Totò, Vittorio and the Doctor) is a 1957 Italian comedy film directed by Camillo Mastrocinque.

== Plot ==
Michele and Gennaro work as attendants in the investigation agency "Nulla sfugge" ("Nothing escapes"). When their boss is forced to be absent from the office to follow an important investigation, the two decide to take his place, pretending to be skilled investigators. Two old sisters, Ada and Ida, come to the agency to ask them to investigate the conduct of the wife of their only nephew, an American doctor from Boston, and they accept the case, which will turn out to be a mess.

== Cast ==
- Totò as Michele Spillone a.k.a. Mike
- Vittorio De Sica as Marquis Vittorio de Vitti
- Abbe Lane as Dr. Brigitte Baker
- Titina De Filippo as Marquise de Vitti
- Germán Cobos as Lawyer Otello Bellomo
- Pierre Mondy as Romeo
- Agostino Salvietti as Gennaro
- Tecla Scarano as Ada Barbalunga
- Darry Cowl as Egisto
- Rafael Bardem as Elia Vagoni
- Luigi Pavese as Head of the investigative agency
- Franco Coop as La Conchiglia's Maitre
- Giulio Calì as Fool from Villa Valeria
- Dante Maggio as La Conchiglia's Waiter
- Teddy Reno as Himself
- Antonio Acqua as Count Salvi
