= The Band of Honest Men =

- Italian: La banda degli onesti
- Directed by: Camillo Mastrocinque
- Written by: Agenore Incrocci; Furio Scarpelli
- Produced by: Isidoro Broggi; Renato Libassi
- Starring: Totò; Peppino De Filippo; Giacomo Furia
- Cinematography: Mario Fioretti
- Edited by: Gisa Radicchi Levi
- Music by: Alessandro Cicognini
- Production company: D.D.L.
- Distributed by: Momi-Caiano
- Release dates: 1956 (Italy); February 7, 1958 (Portugal)
- Running time: 106 min
- Country: Italy
- Language: Italian

The Band of Honest Men (original title: La banda degli onesti) is a 1956 black and white Italian comedy film. The film is known as Die Bande der Ehrlichen in West Germany, and Totó e as Notas Falsas in Portugal. It was filmed in Rome.

== Synopsis ==
Antonio Bonocore, caretaker of a building in Rome with a German wife, is to attend the passing of Mr. Andrea, an elderly tenant who, before dying, tells him to be in possession of a suitcase inside with a few original clichés of the Bank of Italy, of which he had long been an employee, and the watermarked paper to print the 10,000 liras banknote. Mr. Andrea had stolen this material with the intention of "revenge" of his retirement and make fake money. But he never had the courage to succeed in its intention and, therefore, asked Bonocore to throw the bag into the river to destroy the contents. Bonocore, however, is going through a bad time: basically an honest person, has refused to become an accomplice of accountant Casoria, the new administrator of the condominium, which had proposed to make a series of fraudulent transactions against the same building, and for this reason is under threat of dismissal. Thus he decides not to destroy the bag but, ignoring the banknote printing techniques, to produce 10,000 notes is forced to ask the cooperation of the typographer Giuseppe Lo Turco (The Turk) and, later, the painter Cardone, both with economic problems. Building on the economic needs of his cronies, Bonocore arranges secret and hilarious meetings at night to give life to a gang of counterfeiters. The three manage to print banknotes and "split" in a tobacconist one night, but things get complicated when Bonocore discovers that his eldest son Michele, a brilliant revenue officer recently moved to Rome, is following its own delicate investigation on a batch of counterfeit notes.

After having heard some details from Michele, and vaguely talked to the supervisor of his son (il Maresciallo), Bonocore came to visit him at home. Seeing the finance police searching for Mr Lo Turco (founding his typography closed) and noticing strange changes in style in his "partners" (Lo Turco's expensive new shoes, a new coat of Cardone), Antonio is afraid of being discovered, with the aggravating circumstance that all of this, since he is the father of a revenue officer, would cost the job to his son. So he begs his cronies do not spend a lira and immediately dispose of the equipment, burying it out of town.

The son, seeing this strange burial by chance, asks his father what he is doing, but Cardone, also present, does not think better than to say they are burying Mustafa, Bonocore's poodle, killed by a car. Antonio is therefore forced to get rid of the dog, and not having the courage to kill him, leave him on the road, tied to a milestone (a "pietra emiliana" as pronounced by Toto in his frequent deformated language). But Mustafa freed itself and returned home during a visit of Michele's supervisor, when he notices it in embarrassment.

Antonio, now feeling hunted, matures the idea, which he expresses to Lo Turco, to get arrested by Michele: a son who arrests his father - he says - not only will not be sacked, but also would be promoted and would become an example for all of his colleagues. Therefore, he decides to implement his plan by going in person to the police station to be arrested by his son, who thinks his father is just joking. But, after hearing by Michele's supervisor that the investigation followed by Michele resulted in the arrest of professional counterfeiters ("Lo Turco? [The Turk?]" "No, the Swiss"). And when the supervisor says the note identified by the police was not one of those produced by the three, but the sample used - a false note supplied by a money lender, Bonocore is about to faint. At the end it turns out that none of his members had had the courage to spend the counterfeit notes (Lo Turco had borrowed money from a lender, Cardone had used the money that his "mommy" kept under the mattress).

The three, now at peace with themselves, decide to destroy all counterfeit notes and the suitcase with the clichés, setting up a bonfire: as a final gag, Bonocore realises (too late) that he threw into the flames, in the hurry, even the envelope containing his salary.

== Cast ==
- Totò as Antonio Bonocore
- Peppino De Filippo as Giuseppe Lo Turco
- Giacomo Furia as Cardone
- Gabriele Tinti as Michele, son of Bonocore
- Giulia Rubini as Marcella, daughter of Lo Turco
- Nando Bruno as Maresciallo Denti (Michele's supervisor)
- Luigi Pavese as Ragionier Casoria (accountant Casoria)
- Memmo Carotenuto as Fernando
- Gildo Bocci as tabaccaio
- Lauro Gazzolo as Andrea former mint employee
- Yoka Berretty as Marlene
