= Anna's Sin =

- Directed by: Camillo Mastrocinque
- Written by: Camillo Mastrocinque; Edoardo Anton; Anna Vita
- Cinematography: Bitto Albertini
- Release date: 26 February 1953
- Country: Italy
- Language: Italian

Anna's Sin (Italian: Il peccato di Anna) is a 1953 Italian melodrama film is a retelling of Shakespeare's Othello.

== Cast ==
- Anna Vita as Anna
- Ben Johnson as John
- William Demby as Sam
- Paul Muller as Alberto
