= Death Rage =

- Italian film poster
- Directed by: Antonio Margheriti
- Screenplay by: Guido Castaldo; Giacomo Furia
- Story by: Pierluigi Andreani; Leila Buongiorno
- Produced by: Franco Caruso; Raymond R. Homer
- Cinematography: Sergio D'Offizio
- Edited by: Mario Morra
- Music by: Guido De Angelis; Maurizio De Angelis
- Production company: Giovine Cinematografica
- Distributed by: Euro International Films
- Release date: 22 October 1976 (Italy)
- Running time: 98 minutes
- Country: Italy
- Box office: ₤639.235 million

Death Rage (Italian: Con la rabbia agli occhi) is a 1976 Italian film directed by Antonio Margheriti and starring Yul Brynner in his final film.

== Plot summary ==
A chance for revenge brings a hit man out of retirement. Sal Leonardi is a well-connected American Mafioso who, while vacationing in Naples, visits a racetrack and is persuaded by good natured tout Angelo to put his money on a long shot. While Angelo sometimes works around the odds at the track by putting front-running horses off their stride with a pellet gun, in this case Angelo's horse wins without outside interference and pays off big. But after Sal collects his winnings, he's spotted by Gennare Gallo, a local mob boss who holds a grudge against Sal's partners; guns are drawn, Sal and his bodyguards are killed, while Angelo, who is also a police informant, is stripped of his winnings.

Back in New York, Leonardi's partners are eager to even the score against Gallo, and they approach Peter Marciani, a former hired killer who retired after the traumatic murder of his brother. Peter is persuaded to assassinate Gallo when he learns that the Italian mobster was behind the murder of his brother; Peter flies to Naples and finds an ally in Angelo, but he soon learns that there's more to this story than he's been led to believe.

== Cast ==
- Yul Brynner as Peter Marciani
- Barbara Bouchet as Anny
- Martin Balsam as Commissario
- Massimo Ranieri as Angelo
- Giancarlo Sbragia as Gennaro Gallo
- Sal Borgese as Vincent
- Giacomo Furia as Brigadiere Cannavale
- Loris Bazzocchi as Pasquale
- Rosario Borelli as Gallo's henchman
- Luigi Bonos as Peppiniello
- Renzo Marignano as Doctor
- Tommaso Palladino as Gallo's henchman

== Production ==
Antonio Margheriti's two films Death Rage and The Rip-Off were both starring vehicles for big name foreign actors, but while the latter is set in the United States and features a largely English-speaking cast, Death Rage is set in Naples. The film was shot at Incir-De Paolis in Rome and on location in Naples. The action scenes in the film were shot by assistant director Ignazio Dolce.

According to Margheriti's friend Giacomo Furia, the character actor playing the Commissioner's assistant in the film co-wrote the script. The original story came from director Silvio Siano. The script was written quickly, after Margheriti managed to cast Yul Brynner as the lead. As with other Italian-made genre films, it borrows from other popular films of the era, in this case The Mechanic.

According to Barbara Bouchet, she and Brynner did not get along on the set and he treated the crew rudely. The film was Brynner's last screen role; the rest of his career was devoted to the stage. Brynner and Margheriti planned another film, about game hunters in Africa during World War I, but it never entered production.

== Release ==
Death Rage was distributed in Italy by Euro International Films. It was released on 22 October 1976 where it grossed a total of 630,234,524 Italian lire on its theatrical release. The film was released in the United Kingdom under the title Anger in His Eyes.

Home video versions of the film released in the 1980s omitted the opening scene; it was available in its complete form on an Italian DVD. A blu-ray was released by Dark Force Entertainment in February 2020.

== Reception ==
In a contemporary review, the Monthly Film Bulletin stated that the film was "short on plausibility" and "long on picturesque scene-setting and rhetorical optical effects." The review found the film's plot to be "no substitute for suspense or cogent plotting."

From retrospective reviews, AllMovie stated that the film "isn't afraid to play broad, and as a consequence it frequently feels more silly than suspenseful" and that "Margheriti has the good sense to keep the story moving forward at all times no matter what, and for all its faults it's an entertaining bit of European crime fare."

== Notes ==
=== Bibliography ===
- Curti, Roberto (2013). Italian Crime Filmography, 1968–1980. McFarland. ISBN 978-0786469765.
- Deming, Mark. "Death Rage". AllMovie. Archived from the original on 20 June 2013.
- Pulleine, Tim (1977). "Con la rabbia agli occhi". Monthly Film Bulletin. Vol. 44, no. 516. London: British Film Institute.
