= Labbra rosse =

- Directed by: Giuseppe Bennati
- Release date: 1960
- Country: Italy
- Language: Italian

Labbra rosse is a 1960 Italian film directed by Giuseppe Bennati and starring Gabriele Ferzetti.

== Plot ==
Rome. The lawyer Martini discovers that his sixteen-year-old daughter Baby did not go by train to Rapallo as she had told her family. He then begins to investigate, but without informing his wife of her so as not to worry her. Martini approaches Irene, Baby's friend and schoolmate, who is not of much help to him; the man suspects, however, that Irene knows more than what she tells, and begins to frequent her circle to find out more. As the relationship between the mature lawyer and the young student becomes more and more intense, Martini discovers that his daughter Baby has just ended a relationship with a certain Giorgio Carrei, a forty-year-old architect already married.

== Cast ==
- Gabriele Ferzetti as Avvocato Paolo Martini
- Jeanne Valérie as Irene
- Giorgio Albertazzi as Giorgio Carrei
- Christine Kaufmann as Baby
- Marina Bonfigli as Signora Martini
- Laura Betti as Painter Girl
- Leonardo Porzio as Doorkeeper of Via Dalmazia
- Pino Colizzi as Employee of Carrei (as Giuseppe Colizzi)
- Elvy Lissiak as Secretary of Carrei
- Elena Forte as Mrs. Carrei
- Rita Livesi as Sister
- Gianni Solaro as Commissioner Pagano
- Nino Fuscagni as Ghigo (as Serafino Fuscagni)
- Fabrizio Capucci
- Tullio Altamura as Hotel Doorman
