= I quattro del pater noster =

In the Name of the Father
- Italian: I quattro del pater noster
- Directed by: Ruggero Deodato
- Written by: Maurizio Costanzo
- Screenplay by: Luciano Ferri; Augusto Finocchi
- Story by: Luciano Ferri; Augusto Finocchi
- Produced by: Franco Cittadini; Stenio Fiorentini
- Starring: Paolo Villaggio; Oreste Lionello; Lino Toffolo; Enrico Montesano
- Cinematography: Riccardo Pallottini
- Edited by: Alberto Gallitti
- Music by: Luis Bacalov
- Production company: S.P.E.D. Film
- Release date: 3 April 1969 (Italy)
- Running time: 98 minutes

In the Name of the Father (Italian: I quattro del pater noster) is a 1969 Italian western comedy film directed by Ruggero Deodato and starring the popular Italian comedian Paolo Villaggio, Oreste Lionello, Lino Toffolo and Enrico Montesano.

== Cast ==
- Paolo Villaggio as Paul
- Lino Toffolo as Eddy
- Enrico Montesano as Mambo
- Oreste Lionello as Lazzaro
- Rosemary Dexter
- Mariangela Giordano
- Silvia Donati
- Enzo Fiermonte
- Salvatore Borgese
- Gaetano Scala
- Paolo Magalotti
- Fortunato Arena
- Gaetano Imbró
- Mimmo Poli

== Bibliography ==
- Paul, Louis (1 August 2013). Italian Horror Film Directors. McFarland Publishing. p. 376. ISBN 9780786487493.
