= William Demby =

African-American writer (1922–2013)

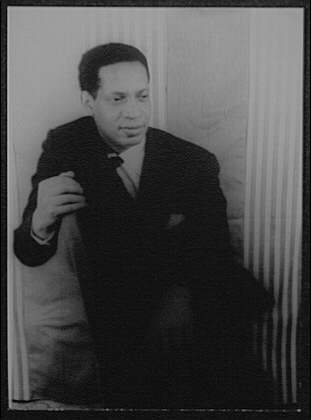
- Demby in 1956; Photo by Carl Van Vechten
- Born: William Demby; December 25, 1922; Pittsburgh, Pennsylvania, US
- Died: May 23, 2013 (aged 90); Sag Harbor, Long Island, NY, US
- Education: Fisk University; University of Rome
- Occupations: Novelist, actor
- Spouse(s): Lucia Drudi (1953–95, her death); Barbara Morris (2004–his death)
- Writing career
- Period: 1950–2013
- Notable works: Beetlecreek; The Catacombs; Love Story Black; King Comus
- Notable awards: Anisfield-Wolf 2006 Lifetime Achievement Award

William Demby (December 25, 1922 – May 23, 2013) was an African-American writer, whose works include Beetlecreek (1950), The Catacombs (1965), Love Story Black (1978) and King Comus (published posthumously in November 2017).

== Life ==
William Demby was born in Pittsburgh, Pennsylvania, on December 25, 1922, to William and Gertrude Demby. He was raised alongside six siblings by his mother, who was a schoolteacher, and his father, who worked for a natural gas company. His family later moved to Clarksburg, West Virginia. He studied English briefly at West Virginia State University with Margaret Walker but was drafted into an African-American cavalry unit that was deployed to North Africa and Italy during World War II. During his military service he contributed to the Army publication Stars and Stripes.

After the war he graduated from Fisk University in Nashville, Tennessee, in 1947, where poet Robert Hayden was his mentor. That same year, he moved to Rome, Italy, where he studied art and art history at the University of Rome. In 1953, he married Italian writer Lucia Drudi, a poet, novelist, translator, and screenwriter. In 1955, the couple had a son, James Gabriele Demby, who composes and teaches music in Italy. Lucia Drudi died in 1995.

During his decades living in Rome, Demby worked for many important Italian film directors, among them Federico Fellini, translating Italian screenplays and films into English. He was assistant director of dialogue on Roberto Rossellini's film Europa 51, starring Ingrid Bergman. He acted in the film Anna's Sin, a retelling of Shakespeare's Othello set in 1950s Rome whose interracial romance ends happily. Demby also wrote for various American magazines, including The Reporter.

In Italy, he wrote his first existentialist novel, Beetlecreek (1950), which went on to be one of his first greatest works. Then, he released an even more experimental novel, The Catacombs (1965).

Later in life, he reconnected with Barbara Morris, whom he knew from his time at Fisk University. Morris was a former lawyer with the NAACP, and the two married in 2004.

Demby began teaching English in 1969 at the college of Staten Island (CUNY), where he worked until the late 1980s. Demby's third novel, Love Story Black, was published in 1978 by Reed, Cannon and Johnson. Demby returned to Italy often, spending time in Rome, and in a villa in Tuscany, where he lived for nearly a decade from the late 1980s until the late 1990s. He spent his final years in Sag Harbor, New York.

In 2006, Demby was honored with the Anisfield-Wolf Book Award for lifetime achievement.

His last novel, King Comus, was finished in 2007 but remained in manuscript form at the time of Demby's death. Published posthumously in November 2017 by Ishmael Reed Publishing Company, it was designated "REDISCOVERED NOVEL OF THE YEAR" by Jeff Biggers in the Huffington Post.

William Demby died in Sag Harbor, Long Island, New York, on May 23, 2013, aged 90.

== Career ==
Books

- Beetlecreek (1950)
  - Set in West Virginia, the novel follows the intricate race relations between an elderly white man, a young black teen involved in gangs, and an artist in an unhealthy relationship.
- The Catacombs (1965)
  - Expanding the literary boundaries for Black authors, this semi-autobiographical novel follows the main character Bill Demby and his experience as an author living in Rome.
- Love Story Black (1978)
- Blueboy (1980)
- King Comus, 2007 (published posthumously in November 2017)

Films

Assistant Director

- Europe '51 (1952)

Screenwriter

- Commando (1962)
- The Eye of the Needle (1963)
  - A lawyer defends two men in Sicily accused of raping a young woman.
- Congo Vivo (1962)
  - Set during the revolution in Congo, the plot follows an Italian journalist who is in love with the wife of a Belgian businessman.

Actor

- Anna's Sin (1953)
- Seven Deadly Sins, "L'invidia" (1952)
  - A French/Italian co-production covering the seven deadly sins. Two episodes from Italy, and five from France, the series also covers an eighth sin: eighth unknown sin. The series is introduced and sometimes narrated by a carnival barker named Gerald Philipe.

Translator

- L'occhio selvaggio (1967)

== See also ==
- African-American literature
- A profile piece on William Demby by Jeff Biggers
