= Tecla Scarano =

Italian actress (1894–1978)

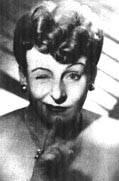
- Born: 20 August 1894; Naples, Italy
- Died: 22 December 1978 (aged 84); Naples, Italy
- Occupation: Actress
- Years active: 1937–1966 (films)

Tecla Scarano (20 August 1894 – 22 December 1978) was an Italian actress and singer. She appeared in more than 30 films between 1937 and 1966.

== Life and career ==
Born in Naples, the daughter of tenor Giovanni Moretti and operetta singer Anna Scarano, she started performing as a child actress at 9 years old and as a singer aged 10 years old. At fifteen years old, Scarano was already well known in Naples as a café-chantant singer and actress, specialized in the repertoires of Luisella Viviani and Elvira Donnarumma.

== Partial filmography ==
- When Naples Sings (1926, Documentary short)
- It Was I! (1937) - Fiammetta's mother
- Gli ultimi giorni di Pompeo (1937)
- The Children Are Watching Us (1944) - La signora Resta
- La figlia del peccato (1949) - Anna Jervolino
- L'acqua li portò via (1949)
- Lo zappatore (1950)
- Bellissima (1951) - Tilde Spernanzoni
- Il tallone di Achille (1952) - Stella Piccola
- Naples Sings (1953) - Donna Concetta
- Soli per le strade (1953)
- Balocchi e profumi (1953)
- The Doctor of the Mad (1954) - La moglie di Felice
- Bread, Love and Jealousy (1954) - Teresinella
- An American in Rome (1954) - Spettatrice alla TV (uncredited)
- The Gold of Naples (1954) - Un amico di Peppino (segment "Pizze a credito")
- Scapricciatiello (1955) - Assunta, Renato's servant
- Crime in the Streets (1956) - Step-Mother
- Te stò aspettanno (1956)
- The Lady Doctor (1957) - Zia Ada Barbalunga
- Primo applauso (1957)
- La trovatella di Pompei (1957) - Donna Nunziata
- Perfide.... ma belle (1959) - Donna Tecla
- Solitudine (1961)
- Yesterday, Today and Tomorrow (1963) - Verace's sister (segment "Adelina")
- Marriage Italian Style (1964) - Rosalia
- Letti sbagliati (1965) - (La suocera / segment "Quel porco di Maurizio")
- Made in Italy (1965) - His Mother (segment "5 'La Famiglia', episode 1")
- Te lo leggo negli occhi (1965) - Filomena
- Marcia nuziale (1966)
- A Question of Honour (1966) - Efisio's mother
- Our Husbands (1966) - Aunt Bice (segment "Il marito di Olga")
- Shoot Loud, Louder... I Don't Understand (1966) - Zia Rosa Cimmaruta
