= Lia Zoppelli =

Italian actress (1920–1988)

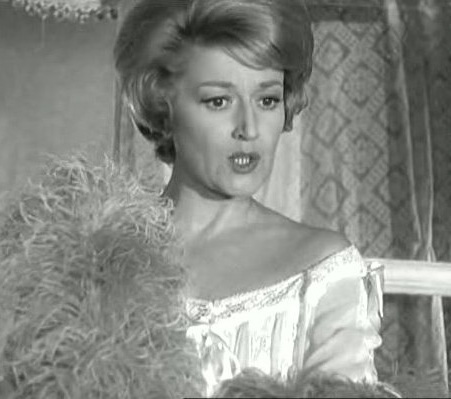
- Lia Zoppelli in Who Hesitates is Lost (1960)
- Born: 16 November 1920; Milan, Italy
- Died: 2 January 1988 (aged 67); Rome, Italy
- Occupation: Actress

Lia Zoppelli (16 November 1920 – 2 January 1988) was an Italian stage, television and film actress.

== Life and career ==
Born in Milan, Zoppelli made her stage debut in 1939, shortly after her high school graduation, with the company Maltagliati-Cimara-Ninchi. Mainly active on stage, in the subsequent seasons she worked with Ruggero Ruggeri (1940–41) and Memo Benassi (1942–43), then, after the war, she notably worked with Luchino Visconti and with Giorgio Strehler at the Piccolo Teatro. In cinema, Zoppelli became a popular character actress starting from the late 1950s, usually in comedic roles; she was also active on television, where she gained a large popularity thanks to her appearances with Enrico Viarisio in Carosello.

== Partial filmography ==
- Il sogno di tutti (1940) - La fanciulla sedotta
- Processo delle zitelle (1945) - Sara
- Uncle Was a Vampire (1959) - Letizia
- La cambiale (1959) - La moglie di Alfredo
- Cerasella (1959)
- Genitori in blue-jeans (1960) - Wanda
- The Traffic Policeman (1960) - Mayor's Wife
- Who Hesitates Is Lost (1960) - Comm. Pasquetti's sister
- Le ambiziose (1961)
- Sua Eccellenza si fermò a mangiare (1961) - Countess Clara Bernabei
- Gioventù di notte (1961) - Madre di Marco
- Totòtruffa 62 (1961) - The Headmistress in 'Lausanne' College
- Scandali al mare (1961) - Contessa Anna Degli Annesi
- The Corsican Brothers (1961) - Aunt Mary
- La monaca di Monza (1962) - La Governante
- Gli italiani e le donne (1962) - Renata (segment "Chi la fa l'aspetti")
- Avventura al motel (1963) - Gertrude
- The Shortest Day (1963) - Erede Siciliana (uncredited)
- Toto and Cleopatra (1963) - Fulvia
- La pupa (1963) - Elena Patella
- Samson and His Mighty Challenge (1964) - Nemea
- Soldati e capelloni (1967) - Dolores
- Anyone Can Play (1967) - Luisa's mother
- We Are All in Temporary Liberty (1971) - Atelier owner
- Rosina Fumo viene in città... per farsi il corredo (1972) - Miss Zanelli
- Count Tacchia (1982) - Duchessa Savello
- La casa stregata (1982) - Anastasia
