= El Fraile (Sierra del Cabo de Gata) =

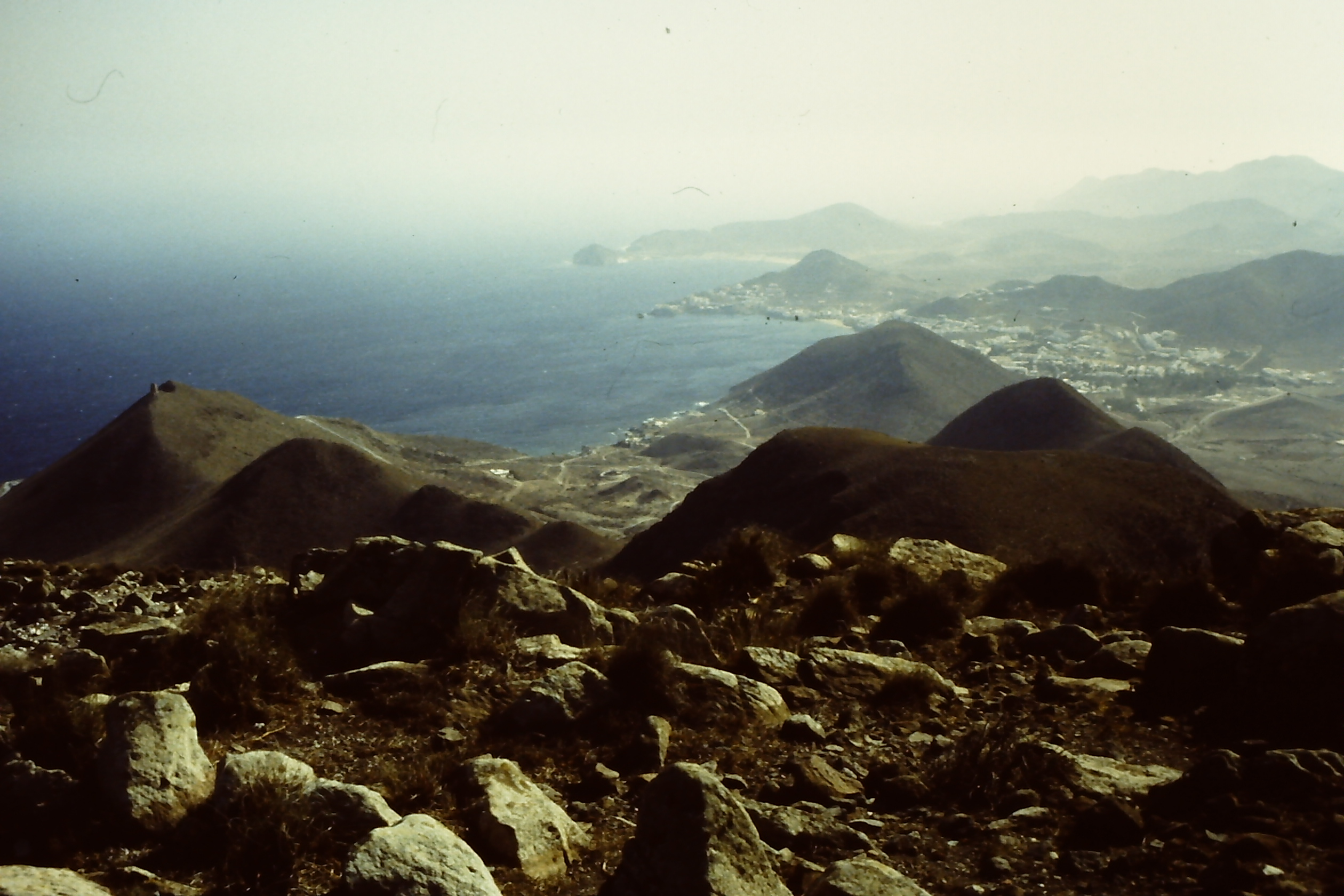
- View from the summit to the coast

Highest point
- Elevation: 493 m (1,617 ft)
- Coordinates: 36°46′55″N 2°04′54″W

Geography
- Location within Spain
- Location: Andalucia, Spain

Climbing
- Easiest route: hike w/o trail

El Fraile, Cerro del Fraile, Cerro de los Frailes or Pico del los Frailes is the highest peak in the coastal range of the Sierra del Cabo de Gata in the Cabo de Gata-Níjar Natural Park.

Like the rest of the range the peak is of volcanic origin. The last eruption dates about 8 million years ago.

The summit can be reached by a cross-country hike.

== Culture ==
In El Fraile was shot western films like Sugar Colt (1966) and The Good, the Bad and the Ugly (1966).
