= Two Mafiamen in the Far West =

Due mafiosi nel Far West
- Directed by: Giorgio Simonelli
- Written by: Marcello Ciorciolini
- Produced by: Edmondo Amati
- Starring: Franco Franchi; Ciccio Ingrassia
- Cinematography: Juan Julio Baena
- Edited by: Franco Fraticelli
- Music by: Giorgio Fabor
- Distributed by: Fida Cinematografica, Época Films S.A.
- Release date: 1964
- Running time: 100 min
- Country: Italy
- Language: Italian

Two Mafiamen in the Far West (Italian: Due mafiosi nel Far West) is a 1964 Italian comedy western film directed by Giorgio Simonelli. Its stars Franco and Ciccio, and Fernando Sancho.

== Cast ==
- Franco Franchi as Franco Capone
- Ciccio Ingrassia as Ciccio Capone
- Fernando Sancho as Rio
- Aroldo Tieri as Ramirez
- Hélène Chanel as Betty Blanc
- Mimmo Poli as Uomo al saloon
- Ana Casares as Mary Simpson
- Aldo Giuffrè as Avvocato difesa
- Adriano Micantoni as Ramon
- Luis Peña as Giudice Williams
- Félix Dafauce as Il becchino
- Alfredo Rizzo as Colonel Peabody
- Vittorio Bonos as Mano Gialla
- Ignazio Spalla as Uomo con Rio
- José Torres as Pablito
- Giovanni Vari as Un giudice
- Stelio Tanzini as Il guercio
- Loretta Gagliardini as Maria
- Vincenzo Falanga as Primo giudice
- Tony Di Mitri as Jesse James
- Olimpia Cavalli as Calamity Jane
- Lanfranco Ceccarelli as Un detenuto (as Franco Ceccarelli)
- Enzo Andronico as L'avvocato dell'accusa
- Mario Brega as Uomo con Rio
