= Butta la luna =

- Genre: Drama
- Directed by: Vittorio Sindoni
- Starring: Fiona May; Chiara Conti; Giampaolo Morelli; Andrea Tidona; Isa Barzizza; Roberto Farnesi; Vanessa Gravina
- Composer: Fabio Frizzi
- Country of origin: Italy
- No. of seasons: 2
- No. of episodes: 21

Original release
- Network: Rai 1
- Release: December 5, 2006 – May 28, 2009

Butta la luna (Throw the Moon) is an Italian drama television series.

== Cast ==
- Fiona May as Alyssa Calangida
- Chiara Conti as Cosima Calangida
- Roberto Farnesi as Dr. Luca Ferrari (season 2)
- Giampaolo Morelli as Nicola Argenzi
- Andrea Tidona as Attilio Argenzi
- Vanessa Gravina as Sandra Morabito (season 2)
- Isa Barzizza as Egle
- Juliet Esey Joseph as Fatma Calangida
- Nino Frassica as Mario Ficuzza
- Alessandro Dong as a Chinese boy commonly known as "Shanghai"
- Giuliano Gemma as Luigi Zagari
- Anita Zagaria as Elena Marini
- Regina Bianchi as Nonna Cosima
- Lola Ponce as Isabel Diaz
- Carla Macelloni as Vicina degli Argenzi

== See also ==
- List of Italian television series
