= Eighteen in the Sun =

- Directed by: Camillo Mastrocinque
- Written by: Castellano & Pipolo
- Cinematography: Riccardo Pallottini
- Music by: Ennio Morricone
- Release date: 1962
- Country: Italy
- Language: Italian

Eighteen in the Sun (Italian: Diciottenni al sole, also known as Beach Party-Italian Style) is a 1962 Italian teen comedy film directed by Camillo Mastrocinque. The movie was shot in Naples and on island of Ischia.

== Cast ==
- Catherine Spaak
- Gianni Garko
- Lisa Gastoni
- Luisa Mattioli
- Gabriele Antonini
- Fabrizio Capucci
- Stelvio Rosi
- Mario Brega
- Franco Giacobini
- Ignazio Leone
- Oliviero Prunas
- Giampiero Littera
- Spiros Focás
- Thea Fleming
