= Mario Pisu =

Italian actor (1910–1976)

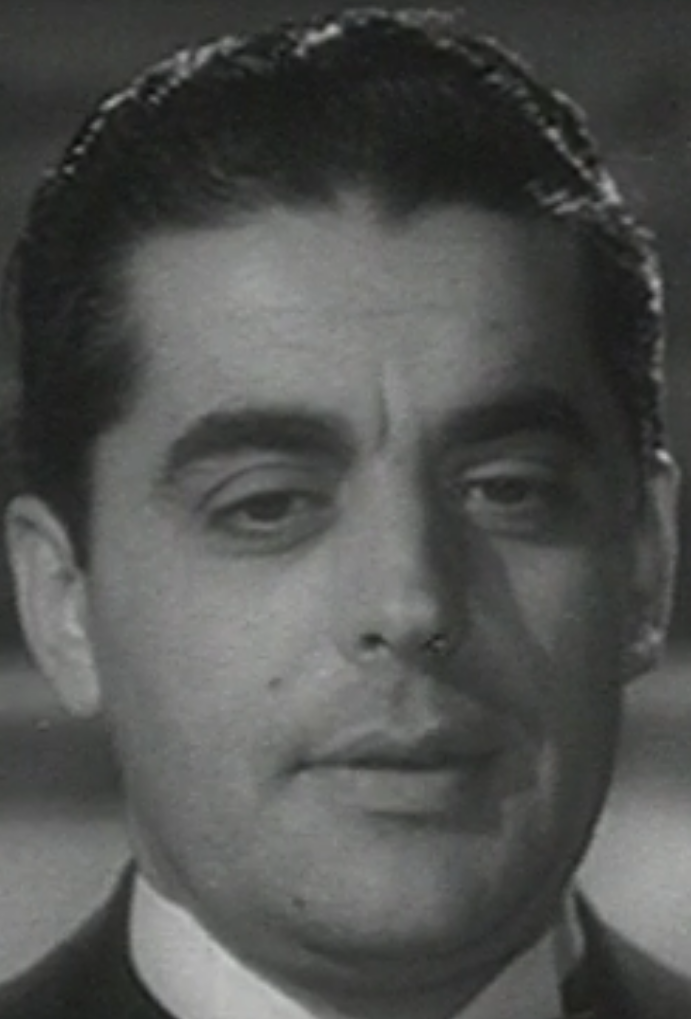
- Pisu in Biraghin (1946)
- Born: 21 May 1910; Montecchio Emilia, Italy
- Died: 17 July 1976 (aged 66); Velletri, Italy
- Occupations: Actor; voice actor
- Years active: 1935–1976
- Spouse: Lilli Trucchi
- Children: 1
- Relatives: Raffaele Pisu (brother)

Mario Pisu (21 May 1910 – 17 July 1976) was an Italian actor and voice actor.

== Biography ==
Born in Montecchio Emilia, Pisu was considered to be one of the most elegant performers of the Italian cinema. He began his career on stage and screen in 1935, making his debut appearance in The Joker King and also making frequent on-stage collaborations with Andreina Pagnani, Evi Maltagliati, Rina Morelli, Paolo Stoppa and Gino Cervi. Pisu appeared in 90 films between 1935 and 1976 and among his most popular appearances includes the 1965 film Juliet of the Spirits starring Giulietta Masina. He also appeared on television.

Pisu was also a popular voice actor and dubber. With a very modulated voice, he dubbed actors such as Gregory Peck, John Wayne, Ward Bond, Walter Pidgeon, Lee J. Cobb, Robert Mitchum, Victor Mature, Fred MacMurray, Kenneth Tobey and many more. In Pisu's animated roles, he voiced Captain in the Italian dub of the 1961 animated film One Hundred and One Dalmatians.

=== Personal life and death ===
Pisu was the older brother of the actor Raffaele Pisu. He was married to Lilli Trucchi and they had a son, Silverio.

Pisu died in Velletri from a cerebral hemorrhage on 17 July 1976, at the age of 66.

== Selected filmography ==
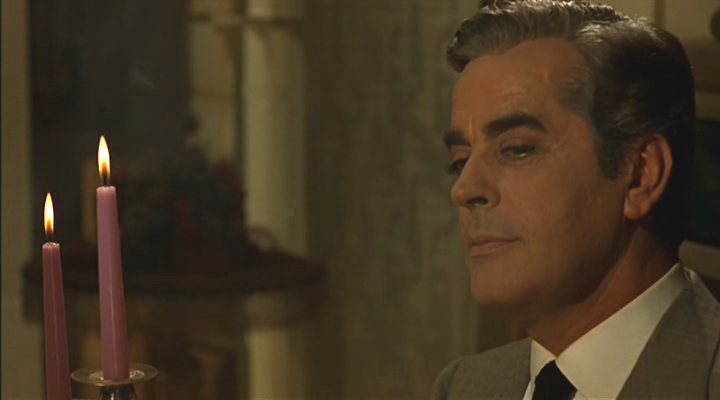
Pisu in Juliet of the Spirits (1965)

- Red Passport (1935) - Gianni Casati
- The Joker King (1936) - Captain Rodriguez
- King of Diamonds (1936) - Franco
- White Amazons (1936) - Biancheri
- The Carnival Is Here Again (1937) - Fausto, il pittore
- Il suo destino (1938) - Andrea, l'ingegnere
- La sposa dei Re (1938) - Il conte Giovanbattista Bernadotte
- Crispino e la comare (1938) - Il giovane pittore
- L'aria del continente (1939)
- The Last Enemy (1940) - Ferdinando De Medio
- Manovre d'amore (1940) - Il tenente medico Skafos
- Princess Cinderella (1941) - Il bellissimo Cecè
- We the Living (1942) - Viktor Dunaev
- Addio Kira! (1942) - Victor Dunaev
- Il nostro prossimo (1943) - Don Luigi
- The Innkeeper (1944) - Fabrizio
- Lettere al sottotenente (1945)
- Romulus and the Sabines (1945) - Alberto Randoni
- Il canto della vita (1945) - Rimondino
- Il marito povero (1946)
- Professor, My Son (1946) - Ettore Giraldi
- Biraghin (1946) - Moreno
- Margaret of Cortona (1950) - Rinaldo Degli Uberti
- The Merry Widower (1950) - Rinaldo Degli Uberti
- Bluebeard's Six Wives (1950) - Sergio
- The Devil in the Convent (1950) - Padre Claudio
- I'm the Capataz (1951) - Hurtado
- The Reluctant Magician (1951)
- Anna (1951)
- Gli uomini non guardano il cielo (1952)
- Five Paupers in an Automobile (1952) - Il direttore del salone auto
- The Temptress (1952)
- Jealousy (1953) - Barone Antonio (voice, uncredited)
- Dieci canzoni d'amore da salvare (1953) - Delle Piane
- Di qua, di là del Piave (1954)
- Toto in Hell (1955) - Tolomeo
- Poor, But Handsome (1957) - Amico del padre di Giovanna (voice, uncredited)
- Hercules (1958)
- First Love (1959) - Paolo
- Hannibal (1959)
- The Cossacks (1960) - Prince Voronzov
- Mariti a congresso (1961)
- Roaring Years (1962) - Peppino (uncredited)
- The Slave (1962) - Goular (voice, uncredited)
- Lo smemorato di Collegno (1962) - Avvocato Dell'Orso
- I motorizzati (1962) - Angelo
- Sexy Toto (1963) - L'impresario (businessman)
- 8½ (1963) - Mario Mezzabotta
- Zorro and the Three Musketeers (1963) - Count of Tequel
- The Organizer (1963) - Manager
- I diavoli di Spartivento (1963)
- Soldati e caporali (1965) - Colonnello Rigamonti
- La violenza e l'amore (1965)
- Juliet of the Spirits (1965) - Giorgio (Giulietta's husband)
- Gendarme in New York (1965) - L'adjudant Renzo
- I soldi (1965)
- Made in Italy (1965) - The Lawyer (segment "2 'Il Lavoro', episode 2")
- Te lo leggo negli occhi (1965) - Dino's Father
- Lo scippo (1965) - comm. Frascà
- Me, Me, Me... and the Others (1966) - Winner of the 'Capranica'
- How We Robbed the Bank of Italy (1966) - Paolo
- Adultery Italian Style (1966) - Il vicino
- Our Husbands (1966) - The Andrologist (segment "Il marito di Olga")
- Atout cœur à Tokyo pour OSS 117 (1966) - Vargas
- Pardon, Are You For or Against? (1966) - Barone Renato Santambrogio
- The Looters (1967) - Patrick O'Hara
- Johnny Banco (1967) - (uncredited)
- Spia spione (1967)
- Morire gratis (1968) - Giovanni
- Emma Hamilton (1968) - Le roi Ferdinand de Naples
- L'amore è come il sole (1969)
- Temptation (1969)
- Zingara (1969) - Marisa and Silvia's father
- In Prison Awaiting Trial (1971) - Psichiatra
- We Are All in Temporary Liberty (1971)
- Il Boss (1973) - Onorevole Gabrielli
- Sans sommation (1973) - (uncredited)
- Io e lui (1973) - Protti
- The Sensual Man (1973) - Lorenzo Banchieri
- Ordine firmato in bianco (1974) - Attorney General
- Carnalità (1974) - Count Orsani
- The Sex Machine (1975) - Minister
- The Sensuous Nurse (1975) - Leonida Bottacin
- Il giustiziere di mezzogiorno (1975) - Capo della Polizia
- Blue Jeans (1975) - Mario / Lawyer
- Nick the Sting (1976) - Phil
- Sorbole... che romagnola (1976) - The Vicar

== Voice work ==
=== Dubbing ===
==== Films (Animation, Italian dub) ====
| Year | Title | Role(s) | Ref |
|---|---|---|---|
| 1961 | One Hundred and One Dalmatians | Captain | |
| 1968 | Asterix and Cleopatra | Amonbofis | |
