= Franco Cittadini =

Italian film producer

- Born: Italy
- Occupation: Film producer

Franco Cittadini is an Italian film producer. He produced La più grande rapina del West (1967), Soldati e capelloni (1967) and Sugar Colt (1966) with Stenio Fiorentini.

== Filmography ==
- I quattro del pater noster (1969)
- Soldati e capelloni (1967)
- Halleluja for Django (1967)
- Sugar Colt (1966)

== Bibliography ==
- Elley, Derek (1977). World Filmography: 1967. Fairleigh Dickinson Univ Press. p. 688. ISBN 9780498015656.
