= Sugar Colt =

1966 film

- Directed by: Franco Giraldi
- Screenplay by: Giuseppe Mangione; Augusto Finocchi; Sandro Continenza; Fernando Di Leo; Franco Giraldi
- Story by: Augusto Finocchi; Giuseppe Mangione
- Produced by: Franco Cittadini; Stenio Fiorentini
- Starring: Jack Betts; Soledad Miranda
- Cinematography: Alejandro Ulloa
- Edited by: Ruggero Mastroianni
- Music by: Luis Bacalov
- Release dates: 12 October 1966 (Italy); 26 August 1968 (Spain)
- Running time: 106 min
- Countries: Italy; Spain
- Language: English

Sugar Colt is a 1966 Italian and Spanish spaghetti Western directed by Franco Giraldi and starring Jack Betts. It is the Giraldi's second film after Seven Guns for the MacGregors. The film represents the cinematographical debut for Jack Betts, here credited as Hunt Powers, and it is also Erno Crisa's last film.

== Plot ==
Rocco – also called the man with two faces – is visited by Pinkerton, who wants him to investigate the disappearance and possible kidnapping of some soldiers. Rocco declines, as he has a good life teaching women self-defence. When Pinkerton is assassinated, Rocco changes his mind and goes to Snake Valley disguised as a doctor. He uses a narcotic gas to loosen tongues and gets help from a sidekick and two women at the saloon. He is exposed and heavily beaten, but eventually frees the hostages while the big boss, who is responsible, gets killed.

== Cast ==
- Hunt Powers as Dr. Tom Cooper, a famous crack shot government special agent known as Sugar Colt.
- Soledad Miranda as Josefa
- Gina Rovere (credited as Jenny Oak) as Bess
- James Parker as Yonker
- José Canalejas as Bearded Bandit
- Víctor Israel as Gravedigger
- George Rigaud as Allan Pinkerton
- Julian Rafferty as Col. Haberbrook
- Valentino Macchi
- Manuel Muñiz as Agonia
- Paolo Magalotti as Black
- Nazareno Zamperla as a soldier
- Giovanni Scarciofolo as Red
- Luis Barboo as Bingo
- Rossella Bergamonti
- Francisco Braña as a bandit
- Ricardo Canalejas as the bearded bandit
- Patrizia Giammei
- Mara Krupp as the woman with cigar
- Antonio Padilla
- Alfonso Rojas as the sheriff
- Alfred Thomas
- Elisabetta Velinski

== Production ==
Thr film was shot in Tabernas, in the town of El Fraile, in Los Arcos and in Almería.

== Reception ==
Sugar Colt was generally well received by critics, and Tullio Kezich defined it as a "little masterpiece". Over 40 years after it was made, Sugar Colt was screened at the 2007 Venice Film Festival in a Spaghetti Western retrospective. Director Franco Giraldi and star Jack Betts were in attendance.

In his investigation of narrative structures in Spaghetti Western films, Fridlund ranges Sugar Colt among Spaghetti Westerns heavily influenced by secret-agent films, because the hero is shown in company with beautiful women, works to uncover a mystery and - unlike the protagonists in A Fistful of Dollars and Django - does not have any complicating secondary motive.

== Bibliography ==
- Fridlund, Bert (2006). The Spaghetti Western: A Thematic Analysis. McFarland & Company. ISBN 9780786425075.
- Núñez Marqués, Anselmo (2006). Western a la europea...: un plato que se sirve frío (in Spanish). Entrelineas Editores. ISBN 9788498024326.
- Weisser, Thomas (2005). Spaghetti Westerns--the Good, the Bad and the Violent: A Comprehensive, Illustrated Filmography of 558 Eurowesterns and Their Personnel, 1961-1977. McFarland & Company. ISBN 9780786424429.
