= Arienzo =

- Comune
- Comune di Arienzo
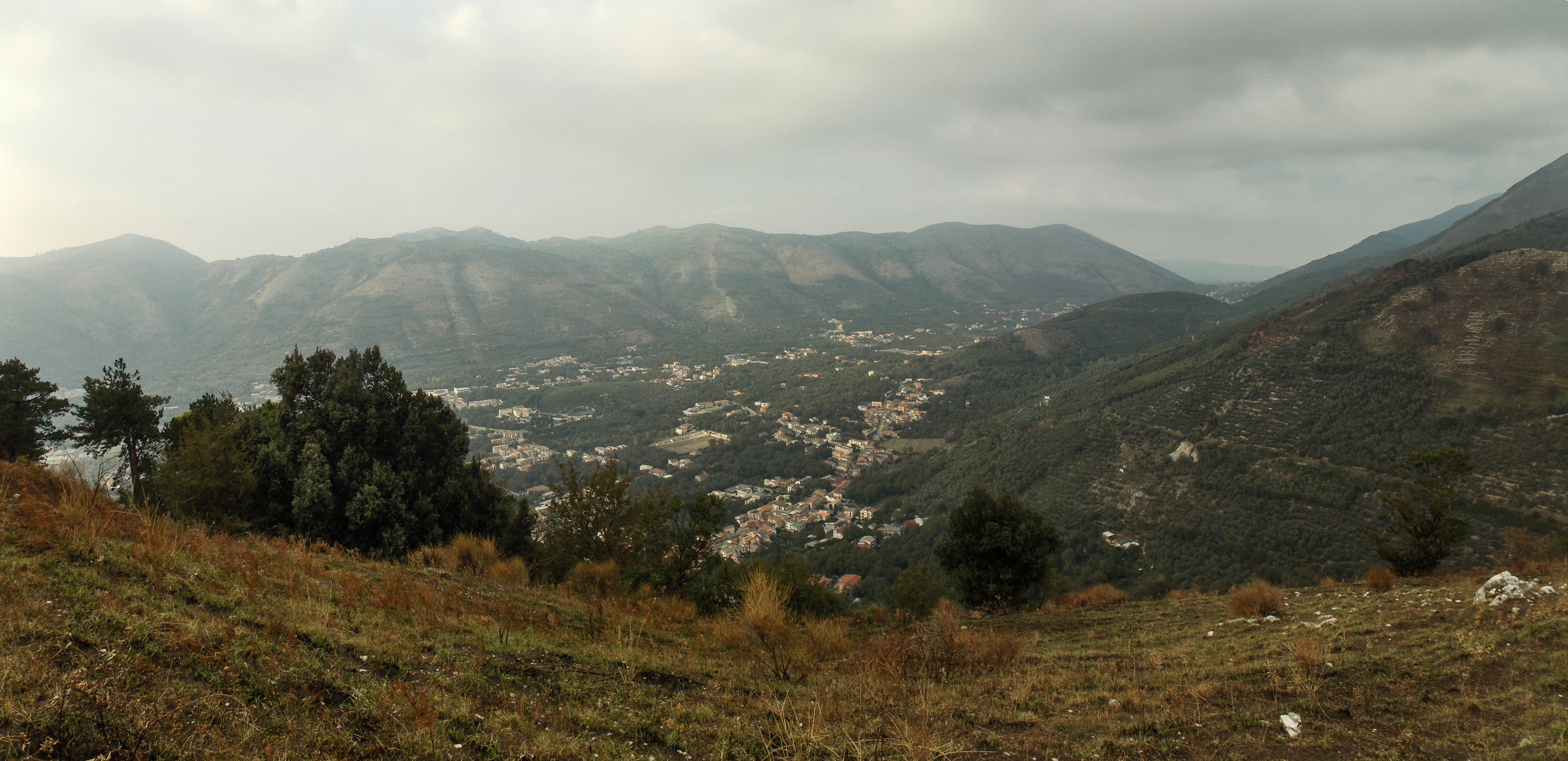
- A view of Arienzo from the hill where its castle is located

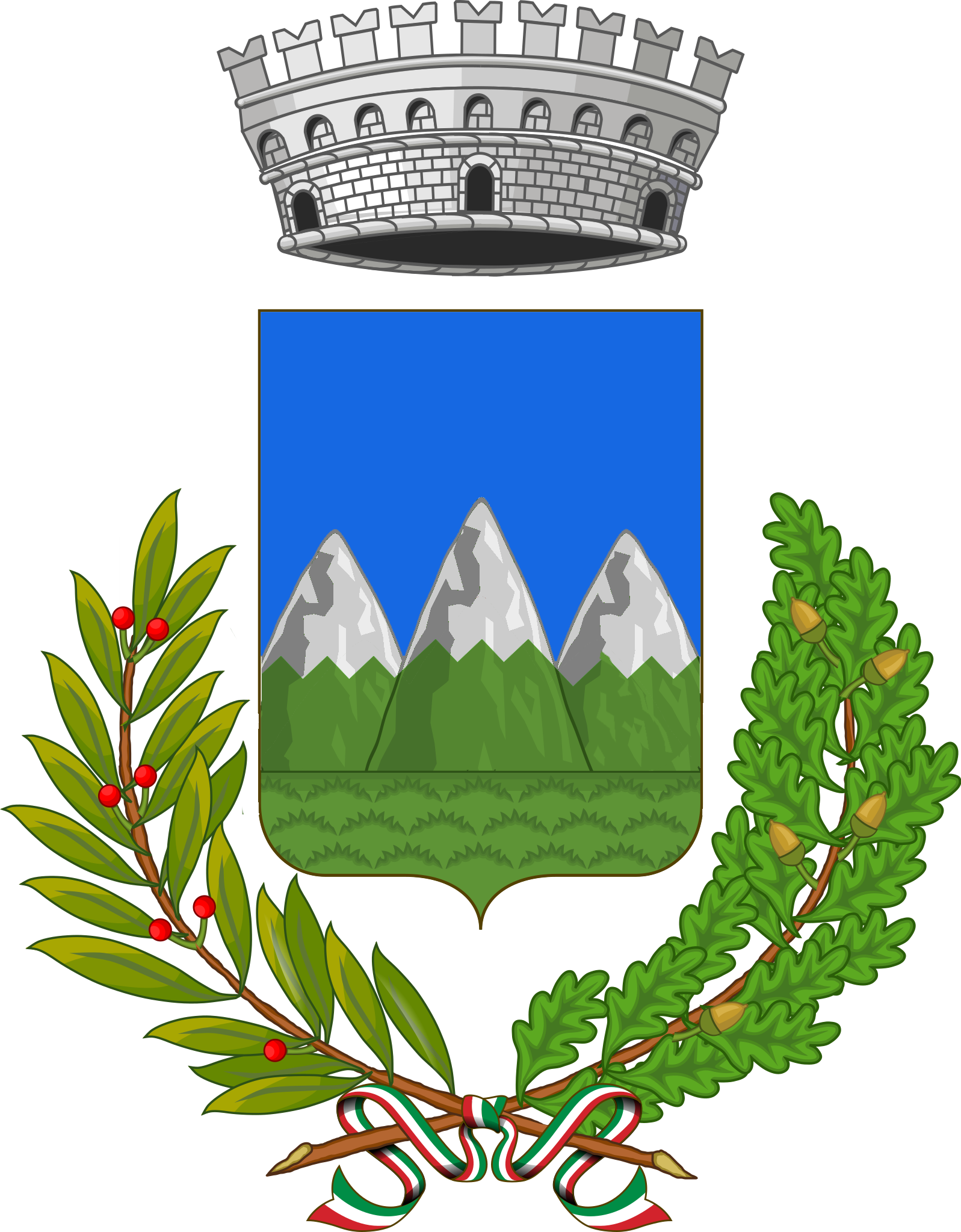
- Coat of arms

- Location of Arienzo in Italy Arienzo (Campania)
- Coordinates: 41°1′N 14°30′E
- Country: Italy
- Region: Campania
- Province: Caserta (CE)
- Frazioni: Crisci, Costa, Signorindico, Capodiconca

Government
  - Mayor: Giuseppe Guida

Area
  - Total: 14 km^{2} (5.4 sq mi)
- Elevation: 70 m (230 ft)

Population (28 February 2017)
  - Total: 5,374
  - Density: 380/km^{2} (990/sq mi)
- Demonym: Arienzani
- Time zone: UTC+1 (CET)
  - Summer (DST): UTC+2 (CEST)
- Postal code: 81021
- Dialing code: 0823
- Website: Official website

Arienzo is a town and comune in the Province of Caserta, Campania, southern Italy. It is located across the Appian Way.

== Main sights ==
On the hill above the town are the ruins of the medieval castle dismantled by Roger II of Sicily in 1135 during his struggle against rebellious barons. The new town ("Terra Murata", which means walled or fortified town) was built at the foot of the hill under the king's supervision and has remained intact to this day.

Although the large parish church of Sant'Andrea was founded during the Norman domination (1151) it contains almost nothing from that period. There is a fresco of the Last Judgement that covers the walls of a large chapel to the left of the entrance (1602). The church also contains several wooden sculptures from the 16th and 17th centuries, including a statue of Saint Andrew.

The Capuchin monastery situated on a nearby hill and immersed in its own citrus tree orchard was built in 1561, though the church was rebuilt in the 18th century. The single-nave church dedicated to the Madonna degli Angeli contains several important paintings: a Nativity by the early 16th century Calabrian painter Pietro Negroni and a Madonna Enthroned by Francesco Celebrano. Saint Leopoldo Mandic lived here for a year towards the end of World War I.

== People ==
- Giacomo Furia, the theatre and film actor, was born in Arienzo.
- St. Alphonse Liguori, bishop of St. Agatha of the Goths, made this his episcopal residence when his health began to decline.
