= Vanina Vanini (film) =

1961 film

- Film poster
- Directed by: Roberto Rossellini
- Written by: Diego Fabbri; Jean Gruault
- Produced by: Moris Ergas
- Starring: Sandra Milo
- Cinematography: Luciano Trasatti
- Edited by: Daniele Alabiso
- Music by: Renzo Rossellini
- Distributed by: Orsay Films; Zebra Film; Columbia Pictures (1979) (USA)
- Release date: 1961
- Running time: minutes
- Country: Italy
- Language: Italian

Vanina Vanini, also known as The Betrayer, is a 1961 Italian drama film directed by Roberto Rossellini. It is based on Stendhal's 1829 novella of the same name.

== Cast ==
- Sandra Milo ... Vanina Vanini
- Laurent Terzieff ... Pietro Missirilli
- Martine Carol ... Contessa Vitelleschi
- Paolo Stoppa... Asdrubale Vanini
- Isabelle Corey ... Clelia
- Antonio Pierfederici ... Livio Savelli
- Olimpia Cavalli ... chambermaid
- Nerio Bernardi ... Cardinal Savelli
- Mimmo Poli ... executioner
- Jean Gruault ... castrato
- Claudia Bava
- Leonardo Botta ... confessor
- Nando Cicero ... Saverio Pontini
- Attilio Dottesio
- Carlo Gazzabini
- Enrico Glori
- Evar Maran
- Leonardo Severini
- Nando Tamberlani
