= The Two Marshals =

- Directed by: Sergio Corbucci
- Written by: Totò; Sergio Corbucci; Marcello Fondato; Sandro Continenza; Bruno Corbucci; Giovanni Grimaldi
- Produced by: Gianni Buffardi
- Starring: Totò; Vittorio De Sica; Gianni Agus; Arturo Bragaglia
- Cinematography: Enzo Barboni
- Edited by: Roberto Cinquini
- Music by: Piero Piccioni
- Release date: 21 December 1961
- Running time: 99 minutes
- Country: Italy
- Language: Italian

The Two Marshals (Italian: I due marescialli) is a 1961 Italian comedy film written and directed by Sergio Corbucci. The film was a hit at the Italian box office, with 2.765.531 spectators and a total gross of 536.513.000 lire.

== Plot ==
In Italy, during 1943, two men collide during the bombing of the Nazis and American allies. Antonio Capurro is a thief who disguises himself as a priest for the robberies at the train stations; Vittorio Cotone is a carabinieri marshal upright who's chasing Antonio, and that in the end, to a misunderstanding, he is forced to do so by Marshal dress. Antonio is excited about the new appointment, and Vittorio meanwhile disguises himself as a priest. In fact the two, in the days of the Badoglio Proclamation, are persecuted by the Nazis and fascists because they're hiding a partisan, a Jewish girl and an American soldier who is planning the Allied landing.

== Cast ==
- Totò as Antonio Capurro
- Vittorio De Sica as Marshal Vittorio Cotone
- Gianni Agus as Achille Pennica, the Podestà
- Arturo Bragaglia as Don Nicola
- Franco Giacobini as Basilio Meneghetti
- Elvy Lissiak as Vanda
- Roland Bartrop (billed as Roland von Bartrop) as Lieutenant Kessler
- Olimpia Cavalli as Immacolata Di Rosa
- Mario Castellani as the Thief
- Mimmo Poli as the Postman
- Bruno Corelli as Benegatti, the Lawyer

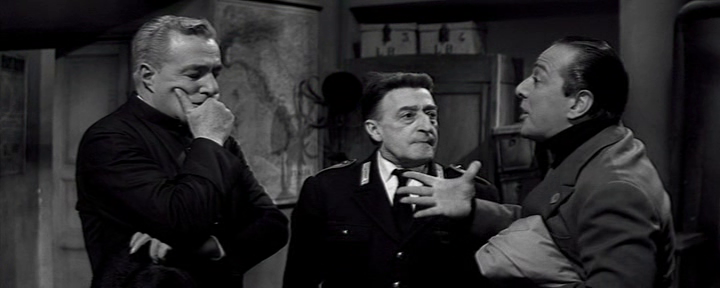
Vittorio De Sica, Totó and Gianni Agus
