= When Naples Sings (1926 film) =

1926 film

- Directed by: Roberto Roberti
- Production company: E.F.A.
- Release date: April 1926
- Country: Italy
- Languages: Silent; Italian intertitles

When Naples Sings (Italian: Napoli che canta) is a 1926 Italian film directed by Roberto Roberti.

== Cast ==
- Rodolfo De Angelis
- Adolfo Della Monica
- Tecla Scarano

== Bibliography ==
- Giorgio Bertellini. Italy in Early American Cinema: Race, Landscape, and the Picturesque. Indiana University Press, 2010.
