= Carla Macelloni =

Italian actress (1937–2015)

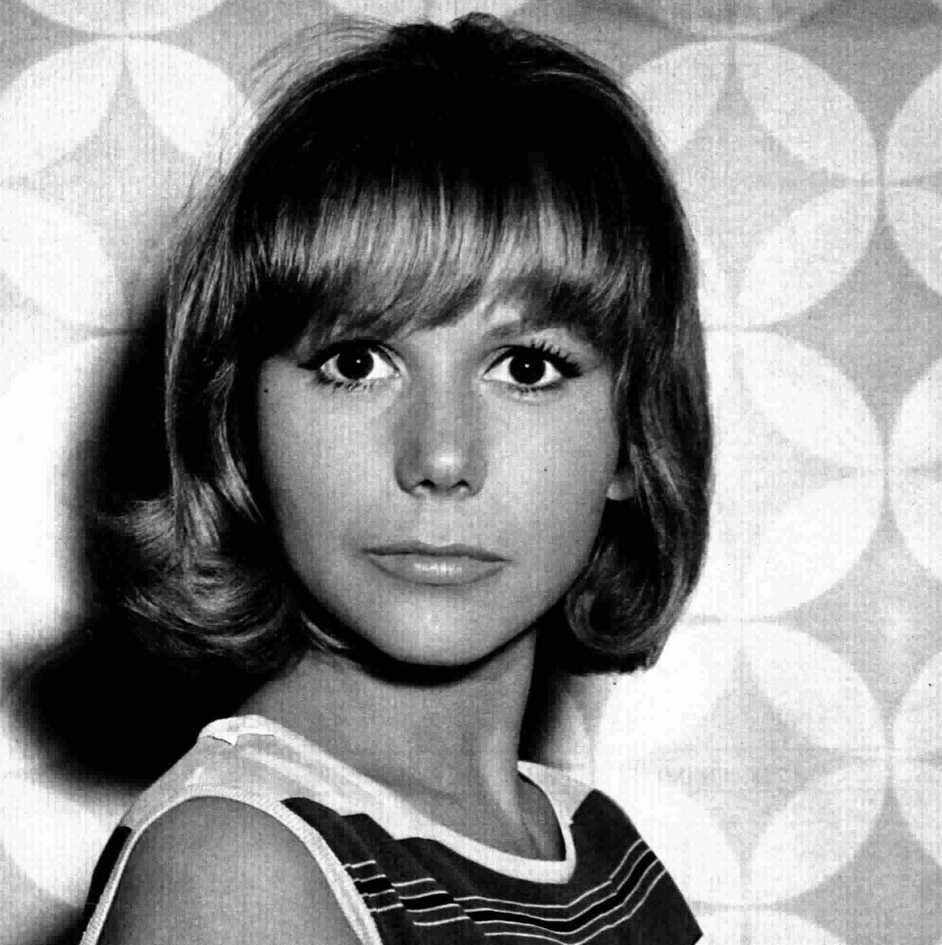
- Born: 17 February 1937; Milan, Italy
- Died: 23 March 2015 (aged 78); Grottaferrata, Italy
- Occupations: Actress, television personality

Carla Macelloni (17 February 1937 – 23 March 2015) was an Italian actress and television personality.

== Life and career ==
Born in Milan, Macelloni started acting as a child, in radio dramas and on stage, with the theatrical company "Compagnia di Prosa". Between the second half of the 1950s and the 1960s she appeared in a number of films, as well as on stage and on television, where she also worked as a presenter and a soubrette.

After a hiatus of several decades, she resumed her activities in the 2000s, appearing in some films and the TV series Butta la luna.
