= Toto in Paris =

1958 film directed by Camillo Mastrocinque

- Directed by: Camillo Mastrocinque
- Written by: Vittorio Metz; Roberto Gianviti; René Barjavel
- Starring: Totò; Sylva Koscina
- Cinematography: Alvaro Mancori
- Music by: Gorni Kramer
- Release date: 1958
- Running time: 97 min
- Country: Italy/France
- Language: Italian

Toto in Paris (Italian: Totò a Parigi, French: Parisien malgré lui, also known as Totò innamorato) is a 1958 Italian-French comedy film directed by Camillo Mastrocinque.

== Plot ==
The Marquis Gastone De Chemandel plans to kill his lookalike Toto, a poor Neapolitan vagabond who is a perfect double of the Marquis, to collect his life-insurance premium.

== Cast ==
- Totò: Marquis Gastone De Chemandel / Toto
- Sylva Koscina: Juliette Marchand
- Fernand Gravey: Dr. Duclos
- Lauretta Masiero: The Gypsy
- Philippe Clay: The Maître
- Paul Guers: Pierre
- Tiberio Mitri: The Bodyguard
- Luigi Pavese: Professor Calogero Tempesta
- Fanfulla: Effeminato del treno
- Memmo Carotenuto: Brigadiere
- Olimpia Cavalli: Donna nel vagone letto
