= Agnès Spaak =

French-Belgian actress and photographer (born 1944)

- Born: 29 April 1944 (age 82); Boulogne-Billancourt, France
- Occupation: Actress
- Years active: 1962-present

Agnès Spaak (born 29 April 1944) is a French-Belgian actress and photographer. She appeared in more than twenty films since 1962. Her father is screenwriter Charles Spaak and her sister was Catherine Spaak, an actress.

== Selected filmography ==
Year	Title	Role	Notes
1962	I Don Giovanni della Costa Azzurra		
1965	Un amore		
1965	I soldi		
1965	La ragazzola		
1965	Dr. Orloff's Monster	Melisa	
1966	Te lo leggo negli occhi		
1966	Killer's Carnival		
1967	Killer Caliber .32	Beth	
1968	Better a Widow		
