= I motorizzati =

1962 film directed by Camillo Mastrocinque

- Directed by: Camillo Mastrocinque
- Screenplay by: Castellano & Pipolo
- Story by: Castellano & Pipolo
- Starring: Nino Manfredi; Ugo Tognazzi; Franca Valeri; Walter Chiari
- Cinematography: Antonio Macasoli Hernandez
- Edited by: Roberto Cinquini
- Music by: Ennio Morricone
- Production companies: Jolly Film; Tecisa
- Distributed by: Unidis
- Release dates: 29 November 1962 (Italy); 10 February 1964 (Spain)
- Running time: 90 minutes
- Countries: Italy; Spain
- Box office: ₤735.68 million

I motorizzati is a 1962 Italian anthology comedy film directed by Camillo Mastrocinque, consisting of five segments all sharing cars as main theme.

== Cast ==
- Ugo Tognazzi as Achille Pestani
- Nino Manfredi as Nino Borsetti
- Franco Franchi as Thief
- Ciccio Ingrassia as Thief
- Walter Chiari as Valentino
- Franca Valeri as Velia
- Aroldo Tieri as Dino
- Alberto Bonucci as Mario Bianchi
- Franca Tamantini as Giovanna
- Dolores Palumbo as Nino's Mother-in-law
- Gianni Agus as Mario
- Marcella Rovena as Maria Grazia
- Mac Ronay as the traffic policeman
- Luigi Pavese as Nino's Boss
- Gina Rovere as Elisa
- Mario Pisu as Angelo
- Mimmo Poli as Vittorio
- Mario Brega as Edoardo
- Mercedes Alonso as Claudia
- Loredana Nusciak as Paola

== Release ==
I motorizzati was distributed theatrically in Italy by Unidis on 29 November 1962. It grossed a total of 735,681,000 lire domestically. It was released in Spain as Los motorizados on 10 February 1964.
