= We Are All in Temporary Liberty =

- Directed by: Manlio Scarpelli
- Written by: Manlio Scarpelli; Ruediger von Spiess
- Produced by: Zafes Film
- Cinematography: Marco Scarpelli
- Music by: Augusto Martelli
- Release date: 1971
- Country: Italy
- Language: Italian

We Are All in Temporary Liberty (Italian: Siamo tutti in libertà provvisoria) is a 1971 Italian crime drama film written and directed by Manlio Scarpelli.

== Plot ==
The body of Aldo Virgizio, a member of the governing majority in parliament, is found in a hotel room in Rome. His death is attributed to a heart attack, and the investigation is closed.

At the insistence of Virgizio's widow, who suspects that he may have died during an orgy, Judge Francesco Langellone reopens the case. Langellone, who harbors undisclosed fascist sympathies, sees the investigation as an opportunity to discredit the democratic system.

== Cast ==
- Riccardo Cucciolla as Mario De Rossi
- Philippe Noiret as Judge Francesco Langellone
- Macha Méril as Gisella
- Bruno Cirino as Panzacchi
- Lionel Stander as Lawyer Bartoli
- Vittorio De Sica as Giuseppe Mancini
- Marilù Tolo as Emilia
- Ivo Garrani as The Chief Prosecutor
- Claudio Gora as The Director
- Francesca Romana Coluzzi as Widow Virgizio
- Mario Pisu as Deputy Virgizio
- Vittorio Sanipoli as Quaestor
- Lia Zoppelli as The Owner of the Atelier
- Umberto Raho as Di Meo
- Vinicio Sofia as The Neofascist
- Riccardo Garrone as The Deputy from Lampedusa
- Jürgen Drews as Jacques
- Renate Schmidt as Iris
- Andrea Bosic
