= Dino (Italian singer) =

Italian singer and actor (born 1948)

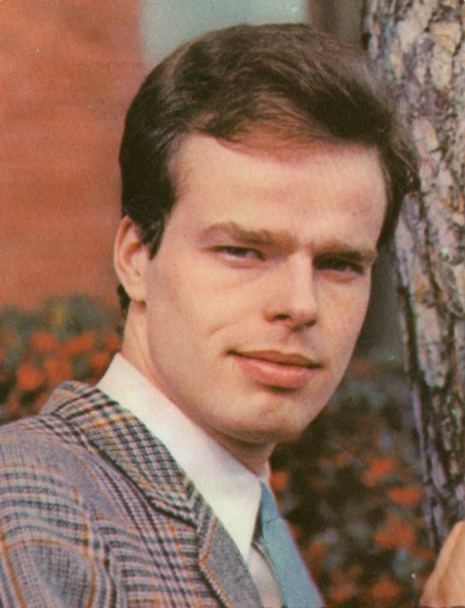
- Dino in 1968

Background information
- Born: 3 May 1948 (age 78); Verona, Italy
- Occupations: Singer; actor
- Years active: 1963–1973, 1980s–?

Eugenio Zambelli (born 3 May 1948), best known as Dino, is an Italian singer and actor.

== Life and career ==
Born in Verona, Zambelli started his career as the singer of the group "I Kings"; in 1963 the group won the second edition of the Festival degli sconosciuti held by Teddy Reno in Ariccia; struck by the voice of the singer, Reno contracted Zambelli with his record company, with the stage name of Dino. Between 1964 and 1968 Dino was a real teen idol and a successful singer, with two major hit singles, "Eravamo amici" and "Te lo leggo negli occhi".

Also active as a film and a stage actor, Dino retired from show business in 1973, and he became manager of an oil company; he resumed his musical activities in the late 1980s.
