= Camillo Mastrocinque =

Italian film director and screenwriter (1901–1969)

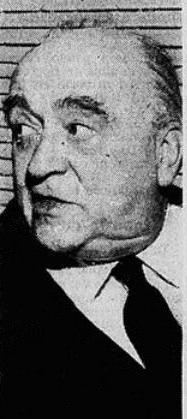
- Born: 11 May 1901; Rome, Italy
- Died: 23 April 1969 (aged 67); Rome, Italy
- Occupations: Film director; screenwriter
- Years active: 1937–1968

Camillo Mastrocinque (11 May 1901 – 23 April 1969) was an Italian film director and screenwriter. He directed more than 60 films between 1937 and 1968, and is known to horror film fans for directing Terror in the Crypt (1964) starring Christopher Lee, and An Angel for Satan (1966) starring Barbara Steele.

== Biography ==
Camillo Mastrocinque was born in Rome on 11 May 1901. He studied architecture at the Sapienza University in Rome. While still a student, he worked as an art director and costume designer on the silent epic Ben-Hur (1925), directed by Fred Niblo. Passionate about theatre, he founded the Teatro delle Marionette Italiane and toured abroad with it. Following his graduation, he spent a few years in France, working as a theatre set designer and newspaper illustrator, and beginning his film apprenticeship as an assistant to Augusto Genina. Upon returning to Italy, he worked as an assistant to Carlo Ludovico Bragaglia, Marco Elter, Raffaello Matarazzo and Mario Mattoli. He made his directorial debut with the 1937 musical Queen of the Scala, which he co-directed with Guido Salvini.

Following the success of the "white-telephones" comedy film I Want to Live with Letizia (1937), he directed the lively comedy La Danza dei Milioni (1940), an Italian take on the self-made man narrative, and the early giallo Validità Giorni Dieci (1940), inspired by the thriller series The Thin Man. He achieved his greatest successes with the historical dramas The Cuckoo Clock (1939), Don Pasquale (1940) and Storm of Love (1941). The latter is considered one of his most successful films due to the effectiveness of its character study and evocative setting.

After World War II, he resumed his prolific career, characterised by his usual eclecticism. He alternated between musical films, such as (1947), and remakes of silent classics, such as the melodrama Lost in the Dark (1947), based on the 1914 film of the same name directed by Nino Martoglio and Roberto Danesi. His work also included thrillers, such as The Man with the Grey Glove (1948), and melodramas such as The Fighting Men (1950), the latter of which was inspired by Pietro Germi's In the Name of the Law (1949). However, comedy was the genre that suited him best. He worked with almost all of the Italian comedians of the time, but he is best known for his films starring Totò, including Toto in Hell and Are We Men or Corporals? (both 1955), Totò lascia o raddoppia? and Toto, Peppino and the Outlaws (both 1956), and The Lady Doctor and Totòtruffa 62 (both 1957 and 1961 respectively). The most notable of Mastrocinque's comedies are The Band of Honest Men (1956), an irresistible epic about a trio of well-meaning apprentice counterfeiters, and Toto, Peppino, and the Hussy (1956), a cult film, in which Totò and Peppino De Filippo demonstrate unparalleled stage harmony and comic timing. Mastrocinque died in Rome on April 23, 1969

== Selected filmography ==
- Queen of the Scala (1937)
- I Want to Live with Letizia (1938)
- The Cuckoo Clock (1938)
- Don Pasquale (1940)
- The Last Dance (1941)
- Fedora (1942)
- Black Gold (1942)
- A Living Statue (1943)
- Lost in the Dark (1947)
- Be Seeing You, Father (1948)
- The Man with the Grey Glove (1948)
- The Fighting Men (1950)
- That Ghost of My Husband (1950)
- Anna's Sin (1952)
- Toto in Hell (1955)
- Are We Men or Corporals? (1955)
- Toto, Peppino, and the Hussy (1956)
- Toto, Peppino and the Outlaws (1956)
- The Band of Honest Men (1956)
- Totò lascia o raddoppia? (1956)
- The Lady Doctor (1957)
- The Beautiful Legs of Sabrina (1958)
- Toto in Paris (1958)
- Men and Noblemen (1959)
- Winter Holidays (1959)
- La cambiale (1959)
- Tough Guys (1960)
- Totòtruffa 62 (1961)
- Eighteen in the Sun (1962)
- Gli eroi del doppio gioco (1962)
- The Motorized (1962)
- The Swindlers (1963)
- Full Hearts and Empty Pockets (1964)
- Terror in the Crypt (1964)
- Te lo leggo negli occhi (1965)
- An Angel for Satan (1966)
- The Most Beautiful Couple in the World (1968)
