= Enzo Petito =

Italian actor

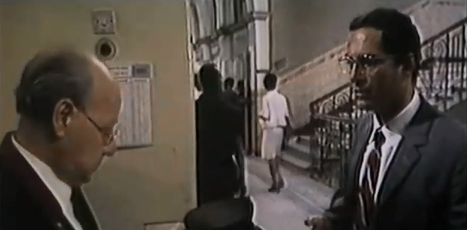
- Enzo Petito (left) and Nino Manfredi in Made in Italy (1965)
- Born: Vincenzo Squatriti; 24 July 1897; Naples, Kingdom of Italy
- Died: 17 July 1967 (aged 69); Rome, Italy
- Occupation: Actor
- Years active: 1942–1966

Enzo Petito (24 July 1897 – 17 July 1967) was an Italian film and stage character actor. A theatre actor under Eduardo De Filippo in the 1950s in the Teatro San Ferdinando of Naples, with whom he was professionally closely associated, Petito also appeared in several of his films, often co-starring Eduardo or/and brother, Peppino De Filippo, brothers who are considered to be amongst the greatest Italian actors of the 20th century. Petito played minor roles in some memorable commedia all'Italiana movies directed by the likes of Dino Risi and Mario Monicelli in the late 1950s and early 1960s, often appearing alongside actors such as Nino Manfredi, Alberto Sordi, Peppino De Filippo, Anna Maria Ferrero, and Totò.

Although never a leading actor, he made a number of small appearances as character actors alongside Italy's leading film stars in films throughout the early to mid-1960s and is arguably best known in world cinema for his role as the store keeper in the Sergio Leone classic Spaghetti Western film The Good, the Bad and the Ugly in 1966. His roles ranged from storekeepers and cobblers to priests and homeless men. His role of most esteem, however, is perhaps as Napoleon in Sergio Corbucci's comedy Chi si ferma è perduto in 1963.

== Biography ==
His great grandfather was Antonio Petito (1822–1876), also a Neapolitan, who was an esteemed stage actor, known for his roles as a Pulcinella in the commedia dell'arte theatrical scene. His first role in film was in Esodo Pratelli's comedy, A che servono questi quattrini?, in 1942, playing a notary alongside Eduardo De Filippo, Peppino De Filippo and Clelia Matania. The film was based on a play by Armando Curcio and adapted for the screen by Mario Massa. This role was significant as Petito was later part of the successful theater company "La Scarpetta", at the Teatro San Ferdinando of Naples, which was directed by Eduardo De Filippo, and he featured alongside actors on stage such as Ugo D'Alessio, Pietro De Vico and Franco Sportelli throughout the 1950s. It is Eduardo De Filippo indeed which Enzo Petito is most associated professionally with.

In 1954, Petito portrayed a boatswain in Luigi Capuano's Ballata tragica alongside Teddy Reno, Beniamino Maggio, Nando Bruno and Tina Pica. This was followed by a small role in Mario Mattoli's comedy Poverty and Nobility, which featured Totò as the central character and also starred Sophia Loren. In 1956, Petito again appeared alongside Tina Pica in Siro Marcellini's Ci sposeremo a Capri, in a cast which also included Franco Sportelli, Enzo Turco, Lia Cancellieri and Franco Angeli. In 1959, Petito then portrayed Giovanni in the film Sogno di una notte di mezza sbornia, under his regular theatrical director Eduardo De Filippo who also starred as the main character in the film, with Pupella Maggio, Pietro De Vico, Graziella Marina and Nina De Padova supporting Petito and De Filippo. Later in 1959, Petito starred as a shoemaker in Dino Risi's Il vedovo, alongside Alberto Sordi, Franca Valeri, Livio Lorenzon and Nando Bruno.

In 1960, Petito again featured under director Dino Risi in his comedy picture of that year, Il Mattatore, alongside Vittorio Gassman, Dorian Gray and previous co-stars Peppino De Filippo and Anna Maria Ferrero. However, Petito's role as "Il cavalier Pizzola-to" went uncredited. The film was nominated for best film at the 10th Berlin International Film Festival. Then, in 1961, Petito appeared in Vittorio de Sica's comedy The Last Judgement, (Il giudizio universale). On set Petito was around prominent actors such as Alberto Sordi, Vittorio Gassman, Nino Manfredi, Paolo Stoppa and Jack Palance. Later in 1961, Petito starred alongside Gérard Blain, Paola Borboni, Miranda Campa and Anna Maria Ferrero in Carlo Lizzani's L'oro di Roma.

In 1962, Petito starred in five films. He played a small role as Galliano Rubinace, Rossella's Father in Luciano Salce's drama picture La cuccagna alongside Donatella Turri, Luigi Tenco and Umberto D'Orsi, Padre Guardiano in Carlo Ludovico Bragaglia's I quattro monaci alongside Peppino De Filippo, Aldo Fabrizi and Nino Taranto, and also had roles in Renato Polselli's war drama Ultimatum alla vita, Luigi Zampa's comedy Roaring Years, and also portrayed a homeless man in Marcello Baldi's thriller Il criminale, again appearing opposite Jack Palance.

In 1963, Petito portrayed perhaps his role of most esteem as Napoleon in Sergio Corbucci's comedy Chi si ferma è perduto, also starring Totò, Peppino De Filippo, and Aroldo Tieri. In 1965, Petito played The Usher in segment "4 'Cittadini, stato e chiesa', episode 1" of Made in Italy and then starred in Io, io, io... e gli altri in 1966 which featured Gina Lollobrigida, Walter Chiari, Nino Manfredi and Marcello Mastroianni, amongst others. His final role in cinema was as the feeble, helpless storekeeper in The Good, the Bad and the Ugly who is abused by the bandit Tuco Benedicto (Eli Wallach) and robbed. Petito utters lines such as "Colt, Remington, Smith & Wesson" and "It's all I have" with a sad expression on his face and Tuco memorably places the store's closed sign in Petito's mouth as he departs as a gesture to keep quiet.

== Filmography ==
- A che servono questi quattrini? (1942) – Notary
- Poverty and Nobility (1954)
- Tragic Ballad (1954)
- Ballata tragica (1954) – Nostromo
- Ci sposeremo a Capri (1956) – The Police Commissioner
- Il vedovo (1959)
- Sogno di una notte di mezza sbornia (1959) – Giovanni
- Il Mattatore (1960) – Il cavalier Pizzola-to (uncredited)
- Who Hesitates is Lost / Chi si ferma è perduto (1960) - Napoleon
- The Last Judgement (1961)
- L'oro di Roma (1961)
- Ultimatum alla vita (1962)
- Roaring Years (1962)
- Il criminale (1962) – homeless man
- La cuccagna (1962) – Galliano Rubinace, Rossella's Father
- I quattro monaci (1962) – Padre Guardiano
- Made in Italy (1965) – The Usher (segment "4 'Cittadini, stato e chiesa', episode 1")
- Io, io, io... e gli altri (1966)
- The Good, the Bad and the Ugly (1966) – Mr. Milton, the guileless store keeper robbed by Tuco (final film role)

== Bibliography ==
- Giacovelli, Enrico; Lancia, Enrico (1992). I film di Peppino De Filippo. Gremese Editore. ISBN 978-88-7605-634-5.
- Quarenghi, Paola (1995). Lo Spettatore Col Binocolo: Eduardo De Filippo Dalla Scena Allo Schermo. Kappa. ISBN 9788878901490.
