= Franco Abbina =

Italian actor

Franco Abbina (also credited as Franco Abbine or Franco Abbiana, born March 31, 1934, in Rome) is an Italian actor, active until the first half of the 1970s.

== Biography ==
Born into a family of Spanish descent, before entering the acting field, Abbina studied economics and music. After finishing his studies, he joined the film industry in the first half of the 1960s as a supporting actor. He acted several times alongside actor-director Alberto Sordi.

Among his film roles are Dr. Nisticò, one of the doctors featured in the films Be Sick... It's Free (1968) and Il Prof. Dott. Guido Tersilli, primario della clinica Villa Celeste, convenzionata con le mutue (1969).

He also played Prince Filippo Spada in The Conspirators (1969), who undergoes an assassination attempt by the Carbonari Targhini and Montanari.

In 1970, Franco Abbina participates in the film Let's Have a Riot, again directed by director Luigi Zampa, as in some previous films in which he had taken part, but due to the cut caused by censorship of the episode La bomba alla televisione in which he acts together with Vittorio Gassman, who was the protagonist, his role is absent as the film, after its first release in Italian theaters, is withdrawn and reworked, completely removing the entire episode.

Abbina played fifteen characters in cinema, television and prose theater, and retired in the first half of the 1970s, started painting, illustrated a book of poems by the poet Alda Merini and was exhibited in Rome.

== Filmography ==
=== Cinema ===
- Romulus and the Sabines, directed by Richard Pottier (1961)
- A Girl... and a Million, directed by Luciano Salce (1962)
- Il boom, directed by Vittorio De Sica (1963)
- Shivers in Summer, directed by Luigi Zampa (1963)
- Destination Miami: Objective Murder, directed by Piero Regnoli (1964)
- È mezzanotte... butta giù il cadavere, directed by Guido Zurli (1966)
- Be Sick... It's Free, directed by Luigi Zampa (1968)
- That Splendid November, directed by Mauro Bolognini (1969)
- Il Prof. Dott. Guido Tersilli, primario della clinica Villa Celeste, convenzionata con le mutue, directed by Luciano Salce (1969)
- The Conspirators, directed by Luigi Magni (1969)
- Le sorelle, directed by Roberto Malenotti (1969)
- La bomba alla televisione, episode in Let's Have a Riot, directed by Luigi Zampa (1970)
- The Price of Death, directed by Lorenzo Gicca Palli (1971)

=== Television ===
- Sganarello e la figlia del re, directed by Alessandro Fersen, Programma Nazionale (1960)
- La ruota dei re, directed by Giacomo Colli, Secondo Programma (1964)
- Tra vestiti che ballano, directed by Giacomo Colli, Programma Nazionale (1965)
- Il triangolo rosso, directed by Ruggero Deodato – TV series, episode 2x06 (1969)
- All'ultimo minuto, directed by Ruggero Deodato – TV series, episode 3x04 (1973)
