= A che servono questi quattrini? =

1942 film

- Directed by: Esodo Pratelli
- Written by: Mario Massa; Esodo Pratelli
- Story by: Armando Curcio
- Produced by: Giuseppe Amato
- Starring: Eduardo De Filippo; Peppino De Filippo
- Cinematography: Domenico Scala
- Edited by: Mario Serandrei
- Music by: Franco Casavola
- Release date: 1942
- Country: Italy
- Language: Italian

A che servono questi quattrini? (i.e. "What good is this money?") is a 1942 Italian comedy film directed by Esodo Pratelli and starring Eduardo and Peppino De Filippo. It is an adaptation of a play with the same name by Armando Curcio that two years earlier the De Filippo brothers had played on stage with massive success and critical acclaim.

== Cast ==
- Eduardo De Filippo as Marquis Eduardo Parascandolo
- Peppino De Filippo as Vincenzino Esposito
- Clelia Matania as Rachelina
- Paolo Stoppa as Marchitiello
- Nerio Bernardi as Michele
- Augusto Di Giovanni as Ferdinando De Rosa
- Edwige Maul as Lilli
- Italia Marchesini as Carmela
- Nino Marchesini as Mattia
- Margherita Pezzullo as Luisa
- Nino Vingelli as Fruit Vendor
- Adelina Carloni as Miss De Rosa
- Alfredo De Antoni as Carlo Palmieri
- Enzo Petito as Notary
