= De Filippi =

Origin
- Language: Italian
- Region of origin: Italy

De Filippi is an Italian surname. Notable people with the surname include:

- Andrea De Filippi (born 2000), known professionally as Alfa, Italian singer-songwriter and rapper
- Filippo De Filippi (1814–1867), Italian zoologist and physician
- Filippo De Filippi (explorer) (1869–1938), Italian explorer and physician
- Maria De Filippi (born 1961), Italian television host
- José María De Filippi (born 1982), Argentine footballer
- Ludovico De Filippi (1872–1918), Italian naval officer

== See also ==
- De Filippo, a surname
