= Petito =

Petito is an Italian surname. Notable people with the surname include:

- Antonio Petito (1822–1876), Italian actor and playwright
- Enzo Petito (1897–1967), Italian actor
- Gabby Petito (1999–2021), American homicide victim
- Giuseppe Petito (born 1960), Italian cyclist
- Roberto Petito (born 1971), Italian cyclist

== See also ==
- Voigtländer Petito, 1920s camera
- Petitto
