= Vittoria Febbi =

Italian actress and voice actress

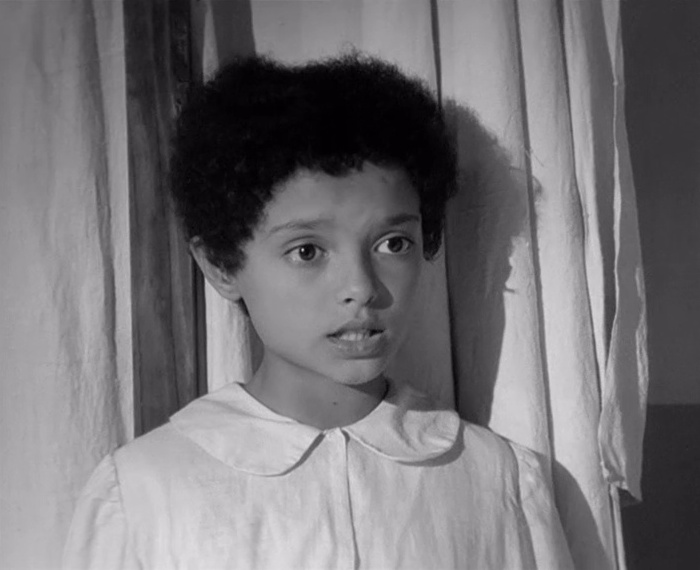
- Febbi in Alarm Bells (1949)
- Born: 13 February 1939 (age 87); Asmara, Italian East Africa
- Occupations: Actress; voice actress; dubbing director
- Years active: 1949–present
- Spouse: Ennio Nobili (m. 1965)
- Children: 2, including Federico Nobili

Vittoria Febbi (born 13 February 1939) is an Italian actress and voice actress.

== Biography ==
Born in Asmara and raised in Italy, Febbi began her career as a child actress in 1949 starring in Luigi Zampa's Alarm Bells. She also performed the Italian voice of the title character in Alice in Wonderland early in her voice dubbing venture. She ended her acting career in 1960.

Febbi began to focus exclusively on voice acting and dubbing. She is the official Italian voice actress of Kathy Bates, Gena Rowlands, Liv Ullmann and Jessica Lange. She has also dubbed Talia Shire in her last three appearances in the Rocky films as well as Diane Keaton in The Godfather films and since 2006, she has dubbed Susan Flannery in the Italian dubbing of the soap opera The Bold and the Beautiful after the death of Angiolina Quinterno.

=== Personal life ===
Febbi is married to Ennio Nobili. Together, they have two children, including dialogue adaptor Federico Nobili, who is in turn the father of voice actress Elisa Nobili.

== Filmography ==
=== Cinema ===
- Alarm Bells (1949)
- Ring Around the Clock (1950)
- Revenge of the Pirates (1951)
- Tragic Spell (1951)
- Cento piccole mamme (1951)
- The Golden Coach (1952)
- Finishing School (1953)
- Città di notte (1958)
- Ragazzi della marina (1958)
- Promesse di marinaio (1958)
- Fury of the Pagans (1960)

== Dubbing roles ==
=== Animation ===
- Alice in Alice in Wonderland
- Aunt Fanny in Robots
- Flo in All Dogs Go to Heaven
- Mayor McGerkle in The Grinch
- Nora Beady in Barnyard
- Narrator in The Pebble and the Penguin

=== Live action ===
- Annie Wilkes in Misery
- Bibby Berman in Used People
- Grace Beasley in Unconditional Love
- Regina Jackson in The Day the Earth Stood Still
- Aunt Mitsy in Rumor Has It
- Headminister in Boychoir
- Dwan in King Kong
- Frances Farmer in Frances
- Carly Marshall in Blue Sky
- Leigh Bowden in Cape Fear
- Patsy Cline in Sweet Dreams
- Bette in Cousin Bette
- Rose Cook Lewis in A Thousand Acres
- Helen in Night and the City
- Carmen Markowski in Broken Flowers
- Kay Adams in The Godfather, The Godfather Part II, The Godfather Part III
- Adrian Pennino in Rocky III, Rocky IV, Rocky V
- Mabel Longhetti in A Woman Under the Influence
- Gloria Swenson in Gloria
- Georgia King in Something to Talk About
- Stephanie Forrester in The Bold and the Beautiful (2006–2013)
