= Death of a Friend =

- Directed by: Franco Rossi
- Written by: Giuseppe Berto; Oreste Biancoli; Ugo Guerra; Pier Paolo Pasolini; Franco Riganti; Franco Rossi
- Produced by: Sandro Ghenzi
- Starring: Spyros Focas; Gianni Garko; Angela Luce; Anna Mzzuchelli; Didi Perego.
- Cinematography: Antonio Secchi
- Edited by: Otello Colangeli
- Music by: Raffaele Del Monte
- Release date: 1959
- Running time: 95 minutes
- Country: Italy
- Language: Italian

Death of a Friend (Italian: Morte di Un Amico) is a 1959 Italian film directed by Franco Rossi, starring Spyros Focas, Gianni Garko, Angela Luce, Anna Mzzuchelli and Didi Perego.

== Cast ==
- Gianni Garko as Aldo
- Spiros Focas as Bruno
- Didi Perego as Lea
- Angela Luce as Franca
- Anna Mazzuchelli as Adriana
- Fanfulla as De Amicis
- Olimpia Cavalli as Wanda
- Andrea Scotti as The Frenchman

== Censorship ==
When Morte di Un Amico was first released in Italy in 1959, the Italian Committee for the Theatrical Review of the Italian Ministry of Cultural Heritage and Activities rated the film not suitable for viewing because it included several immoral scenes which the committee considered to be offensive to public decency. On a second review by the committee, the film was rated not suitable for children under 16 on the proviso that the scene in which Alde and Lea hug each other in bed is removed. The official document number is: 30584. It was signed on 30 November 1959 by Minister Domenico Magrì.
