= Fanfulla =

Italian actor (1913–1971)

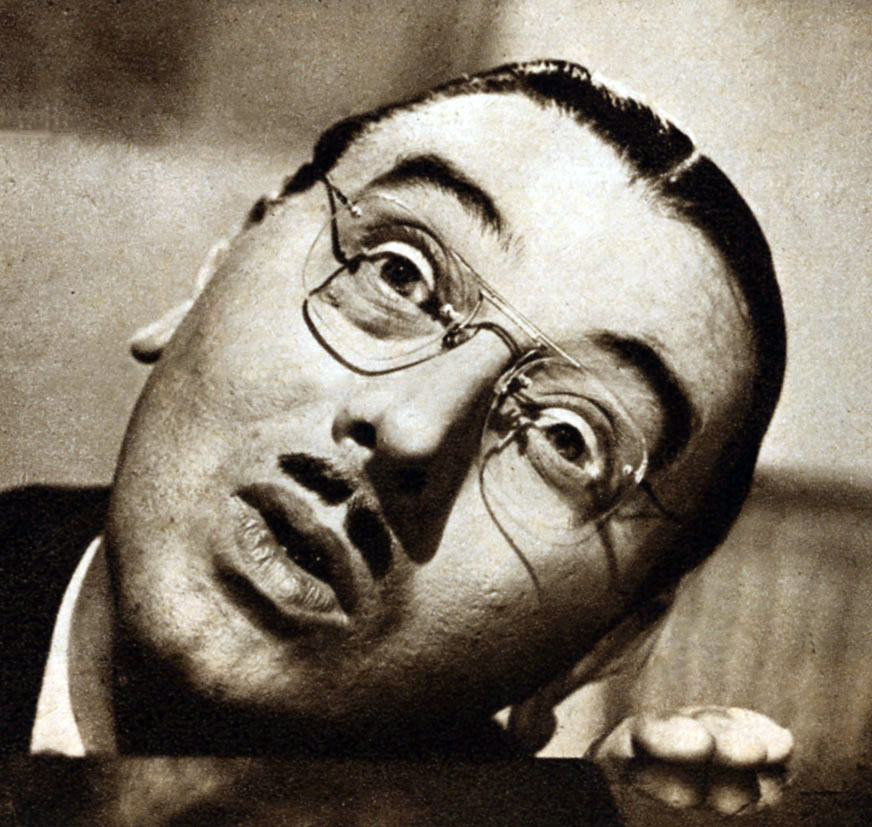
- Born: Luigi Visconti; 26 February 1913; Rome, Italy
- Died: 5 January 1971 (aged 57); Bologna, Italy
- Occupation(s): Actor, comedian

Luigi Visconti, better known by his stage name Fanfulla, (26 February 1913 – 5 January 1971) was an Italian actor and comedian.

== Life and career ==
Born in Rome, Visconti debuted at very young age on stage alongside his mother, the actress Mercedes Menolesi (best known as "Diavolina").

From the mid-forties to the late fifties, he adopted the stage name Fanfulla and was a popular comedian of cabaret and avanspettacolo shows, acclaimed for his brilliant style, referred to as "The King of Avanspettacolo" and even paired with Ettore Petrolini.

His career was relaunched by Federico Fellini, who chose him for the role of Vernacchio in Fellini Satyricon, a role that gave Fanfulla a Nastro d'Argento for best supporting actor. In 1970, Fellini gave him a main role in The Clowns.

In 1971, Fanfulla died from a heart attack in a hotel in Bologna, while he was on tour with his avanspettacolo company.

== Partial filmography ==
- Era lui... sì! sì! (1951) - La guardia
- Tizio, Caio, Sempronio (1951)
- A Thief in Paradise (1952) - Truffatore
- The Piano Tuner Has Arrived (1952) - Adetto militare di Limodia
- Canto per te (1953) - Silva
- Vacanze a Villa Igea (1954)
- Rommel's Treasure (1955) - Muezir
- Toto and Marcellino (1958) - Zio Alvaro Merini
- Toto, Peppino and the Fanatics (1958) - Giacinti
- Toto in Paris (1958) - Il signore del treno
- Son of the Red Corsair (1959) - Marquese di Montélimar
- World of Miracles (1959)
- La Pica sul Pacifico (1959) - Manolo Kivalù
- Quanto sei bella Roma (1959)
- Il Mattatore (1960) - Sor Annibale
- The Dam on the Yellow River (1960)
- Death of a Friend (1960) - DeAmicis
- Caccia al marito (1960) - The Head Waiter
- La banda del buco (1960)
- La sceriffa (1960) - Ciccio - Sceriffa's assistant
- The Passionate Thief (1960)
- The Traffic Policeman (1960) - marito di Amalia (uncredited)
- Love in Rome (1960) - Moreno
- Rapina al quartiere Ovest (1960)
- The Thief of Baghdad (1961) - Abdul
- The Joy of Living (1961) - Prison Chaplain
- Il carabiniere a cavallo (1961)
- Maciste contro Ercole nella valle dei guai (1961)
- Caccia all'uomo (1961)
- Rocco e le sorelle (1961)
- Cacciatori di dote (1961) - Police Commissioner
- I magnifici tre (1961) - Pedro
- Gerarchi si muore (1961) - Police Inspector Capece
- Che femmina!! E... che dollari! (1961)
- Roaring Years (1962) - Comico
- I tre nemici (1962)
- Night Train to Milan (1962) - Il conduttore
- Swordsman of Siena (1962)
- Destination Rome (1963) - Torquato
- La donna degli altri è sempre più bella (1963) - The Manager of the Beach Resort (segment "Bagnino Lover") (uncredited)
- Torpedo Bay (1963)
- Adultero lui, adultera lei (1963)
- The Swindlers (1963) - The Arab merchant (segment "Società calicistica, La")
- Follie d'estate (1963) - Passeggero treno
- Scandali nudi (1963) - De Roberti
- Un marito in condominio (1963)
- Siamo tutti pomicioni (1963) - Colonel Siti (segment "Colonnello e signora")
- Dark Purpose (1964) - Florist
- Una storia di notte (1964) - Barman
- Me, Me, Me... and the Others (1966) - Concierge
- Omicidio per appuntamento (1967)
- Non Pensare a Me (1967)
- Fellini Satyricon (1969) - Vernacchio
- The Clowns (1970) - Owner of the Varieties Restaurant (final film role)
