= Francesco Falconi =

Italian fantasy writer

- Born: 26 June 1976 (age 50); Grosseto, Italy
- Education: University of Siena
- Occupations: Writer, Engineer
- Writing career
- Language: Italian
- Genre: Fantasy
- Website: francescofalconi.it

Francesco Falconi (born 26 June 1976 in Grosseto) is an Italian fantasy writer.

== Literary career ==
He wrote his first book in 2006 with the series of fantasy novels for children Estasia, published by Armando Curcio Editore. Estasia Danny Martine and the Crown Enchanted is a novel that the author wrote at the age of 14 years, influenced by the works of Michael Ende and subsequently published by Curcio in 2006.

After Estasia he has written the saga of Prodigium, published by Asengard Editions, which consists of two books: The Children of Elements and The Acropolis of Shadows.

Along with other Italian writers, in 2009, he participated in the anthology Sanctuary. In 2010, his social novel Gothica. The Angel of Death, was published by Edizioni Ambiente, then The Aurora Witches, by Reverdito Publisher. In 2010, he published a new book, Nemesis The Order of the Apocalypse (Castelvecchi Publisher), with a sequel in fall 2011: Nemesis The Key of Solomon.

In 2011, he also wrote the biography of the singer Madonna entitled Mad for Madonna. The queen of pop, published by Castelvecchi Publisher.

In the same year, he released a new series for children, Evelyn Starr, co-written with author Luca Azzolini and published by Piemme Edizioni, returning you to the fantasy genre with which he began. In October 2011 received the Literary Prize Arte Giovane Roma 2011, section Young Adults, sponsored by the city of Rome.

In May 2012, the sequel of Evelyn Starr, entitled The Queen of No Stars was published by Piemme Edizioni. In the same period, Francesco Falconi entered the stable of Mondadori Editore with a new series for young adults entitled Muses.

He currently works in Rome as a consultant for engineering and writer of children's novels, which have sold tens of thousands of copies.

In November 2012, he came back to publish a new story, kind of weird, titled Halo in the journal Effemme of FantasyMagazine. Since 2008, the jury of the Literary Award Trophy The Centuria and The Dead Zone, dedicated to the stories of the fantasy genre and whose ceremony is held every year in Savona.

In January 2013, the story of Halo was released as a free download on the major digital platforms: Amazon, Kobo, iTunes and Google Play.

In March 2013, the production house Ipotesi Cinema optioned the film rights to the Muses, and the author is also co-writer. In May 2013, a book was published after the Muses, entitled Muses – The Tenth Muse.. In November, the first book of Evelyn Starr was also published in Piemme Bestsellers.

In January 2014, NPE edition published an anthology entitled "Timeless Watches", whose revenues will be donated to the reconstruction of the City of Science, along with other Italian writers like Licia Troisi, Cecilia Randall, and Barbara Baraldi. The story is titled "The Countess of Blood", a reinterpretation of the great historical figure Erzsébet Báthory. In May 2014, a new novel was published by Mondadori Editore, entitled Gray. The book takes inspiration from The Picture of Dorian Gray by Oscar Wilde, although the story is set in Rome in the present day.

In February 2015, "Adam & Eve, the garden of sins" was released digitally by the publisher VandA.ePublishing, the first of a realistic fiction novel from this author set in Florence, which takes up the metaphor of the original sin of Adam and Eve. In November 2015, Prodigium series was published in a single volume on the major ebook store.

== Works ==
Sagas:

- Estasia
  - Danny Martine and the Crown Enchanted (2006) (Armando Curcio Editore)
  - The Seal of Triadema (2008) (Armando Curcio Editore)
  - Nemesis (2009) (Armando Curcio Editore)
- Prodigium
  - The Sons of the Elements (2008) (Asengard Editions)
  - The Acropolis of Shadows (2010) (Asengard Editions)
  - The full novel (2015) (Asengard Editions)
- The Aurora Witches
  - Underdust (2010) (Reverdito Publisher)
- Nemesis
  - The Order of Revelation (2010) (Castelvecchi Publisher)
  - The Key of Solomon (2011) (Castelvecchi Publisher)
- Evelyn Starr (with Luca Azzolini)
  - The Diary of Two Moons (2011) (Edizioni Piemme)
  - The Queen of No Stars (2012) (Edizioni Piemme)
- Muses
  - Muses (2012) (Mondadori Editore)
  - Muses – La Decima Musa (2013) (Mondadori Editore)

Short Stories:

- Anobium, in Sanctuary anthology (2009) (Asengard Editions)
- Halo (2012) (Effemme n°6)
- The Countess of Blood (2014) (Timeless Watches, NPE Edition)

Other Works

- Gothica. The angel of death (2010) (Edizioni Ambiente)
- Mad for Madonna. The queen of pop (2010) (Castelvecchi Publisher)
- Gray (2014) (Mondadori Editore)
- Adam & Eve, the garden of sins (2015) (VandA.ePublishing Publisher)

== Anthologies ==
- Anobium – Sanctuary (2009) (Asengard Editions)
- The Countess of Blood (2014) (Timeless Watches, NPE Edition)
