= Teatro San Ferdinando =

Theatre in Naples, Italy

Coordinates: 40°51′26″N 14°15′49″E

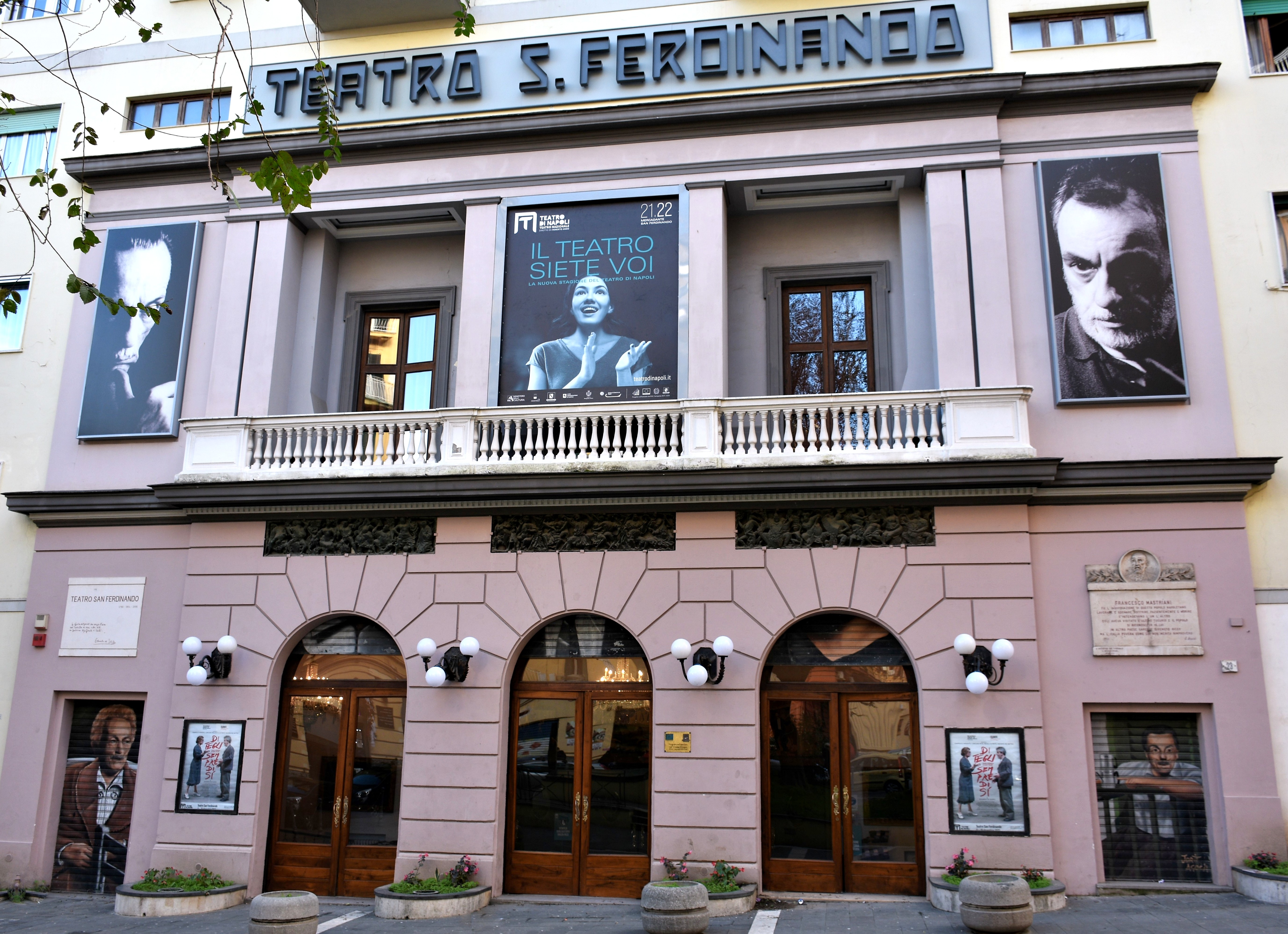
Teatro San Ferdinando in 2021

Teatro San Ferdinando is a theatre in Naples, Italy. It is named after King Ferdinand I of Naples. Located near Ponte Nuovo, it is to the southeast of the Teatro Totò in the western part of the neighborhood of Arenaccia. Built in the late eighteenth century, the seats are arranged in four box tiers, and the pit. It is most associated with Eduardo De Filippo and the productions of the 1950s under his direction. Closed in the 1980s and reopened in 2007, the San Fernando is managed by the Teatro Stabile of Naples.

== History ==
=== Early years ===
Built during the period of 1788 to 1790, it opened with the Domenico Cimarosa opera, Il falegname ("The Carpenter"). La Villana Riconosciuta, another of Cimarosa's operas, had debuted in Naples in 1783 at the Teatro del Fondo, and opened the Teatro San Ferdinando season in 1791. From the beginning, the theatre had problems, undergoing different administrations, soon becoming a venue for smaller companies and for an aristocratic audience.

Between 1814 and 1818, a new building was constructed for the theatre, situated on the perimeter walls of a desecrated church. By 1829, it was rarely open. The Pulcinella actor Antonio Petito first performed here in 1831; his great-grandson, Enzo Petito, performed at this theatre many years later. On November 30, 1843, Marzio Gaetano Carafa, principle of Colubrano, sold the theatre to Enrico del Prete, who then sublet it to Adamo Alberti (1809–1885), comedian and impresario of the Teatro dei Fiorentini. While Giovanna d'Arco was performed at the San Ferdinando in early 1855;. an 1855 handbook included criticism of the theatre, noting its amateur performances. In 1886, it debuted the actor Federico Stella (1842–1927) taking the stage in Crescenzo Di Maio. The typographer Luigi Bartolomeo and the impresario Salvatore Golia bought a part of the theatre. In the 1889–1890 season, the theatre also welcomed the success of Eduardo Scarpetta. Golia and his wife Raffaella Salvatore Bartolomeo (sister of Louis), became the sole owners of the theatre, and he entrusted the management to his son Giuseppe. In 1896, the theatre put on a performance of San Francisco.

=== Later years ===
Salvatore Di Giacomo's O mese mariano debuted at the San Ferdinando on 24 January 1900. In the 1930s, Golia, attempting to manage debt, rented the building. The theatre was transformed into "Cinema Teatro Principe" until September 3, 1943, when American and German bombs destroyed it almost completely. Golia sold the ruins to De Filippo on February 25, 1948, who invested in the reconstruction of the theatre with his earnings from his movies, and with bank loans, forming his Il Teatro di Eduardo. Following the purchase, the SIT Società Impresse Teatrali ran "Il Teatro di Eduardo" and a second company, "La Scarpettiana". In 1954, a new company, "San Ferdinando Film", ran a six show series of the Il Teatro di Eduardo and De Filippo continued to work in cinema to pay for theatre restoration. One of the shows, Palummella zompa e vola (Palummella Leaps and Flies) was an Antonio Petito farce, with De Filippo in the role of Pulcinella. In 1956, the company became "Il Teatro San Ferdinando s.r.l" and the theatre was improved to hold 1150 seats. In its prime in the late 1950s, the theatre featured actors such as Enzo Cannavale, Ettore Carloni, Gennarion Palumbo, Pietro Carloni, Lello Grotta, Enzo Petito, Pietro De Vico, Cilelia Matania, Graziella Marina, Pupella Maggio, Antonio Casagrande, Angela Pagano, Anna Maria Colonna, Nina De Padova, Riccardo Grillo, Vittorio Ardesi, Giorgio Manganelli, Liana Tronche, Maria Hilde Renzi, Andrea Biello, Olga D' Ajello, Scilla Vannucci, and Nico Da Zara. Debts, however, forced De Filippo to dissolve the Scarpettiana in 1960 and to close the San Fernando in 1961. In 1964, the theatre

became the "Teatrale Napoletana", a company founded by Paolo Grassi and Giorgio Strehler, founders and owners of the Piccolo Teatro di Milano. The program was ambitious and prestigious: a cultural bridge between two very different realities, Naples and Milan.

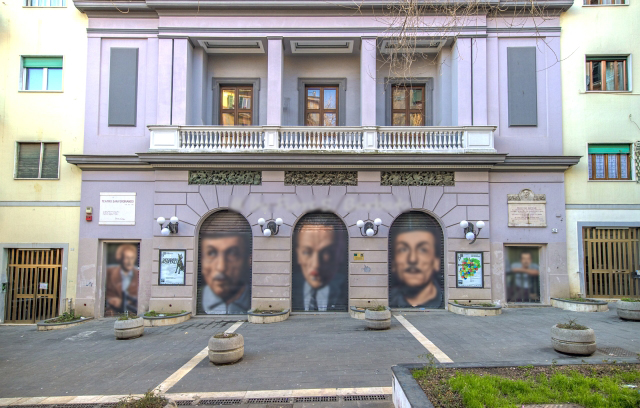
An image of Teatro San Ferdinando in 2018, featuring murals of Eduardo De Filippo by Neapolitan artist Jorit

De Filippo continued to be involved with the theatre and in the early 1970s he decided to create a research centre and museum at the theater, the Archives of Eduardo De Filippo. In 1996, the theatre was donated by De Filippo's son, Luca, to the City of Naples for restoration into a performance venue. The Archives were transferred in the following year to the Società Napoletana di Storia Patria. On 30 September 2007, after many years of restoration and large investments, the San Fernando reopened its doors with Shakespeare's The Tempest, in the translation made by Eduardo De Filippo in 1984. The San Ferdinando is managed by the Teatro Stabile of Naples.

== Bibliography ==
- Vittorio Buttafava, I guadagni di Eduardo nel pozzo del S. Ferdinando, Oggi, a. XI, n. 11, 17 February 1955, p. 52.
- Filippo D’Ambrosio, L’Amministrazione Comunale di Napoli per una nuova politica teatrale, Napoli, Giannini, 1964.
- Isabella Quarantotti De Filippo, Eduardo polemiche, pensieri, pagine inedite, Milano, Bompiani, 1985.
- Eduardo De Filippo e il Teatro San Ferdinando, programma di sala per l’inaugurazione del San Ferdinando, Napoli, Ed. Arte Tipografica, 1954.
- Costantino De Simone Minaci, Federico Stella e il S. Ferdinando, TeatroScenario, a. XVI, nn. 17–18, 15 September 1952, pp. 57–60.
- Costantino De Simone Minaci, Il San Ferdinando e i teatri popolari del secondo Ottocento, Il Mezzogiorno, 31 March 1954.
- Donizetti e i teatri napoletani nell’Ottocento, a cura di Franco Mancini-Sergio Ragni, Napoli, Electa, 1997.
- Gennaro Magliulo, In Consiglio Comunale non si parla di teatro, Il Pungolo, Napoli, 10 July 1965.
- Indro Montanelli, Eduardo, Corriere della Sera, 11 July 1959.
- Umberto Onorato, Fasti dell’antico San Ferdinando, TeatroScenario, a. XVI, n. 10, 15 May 1952, pp. 42–4.
- Vito Pandolfi, Realizzazione di un sogno, Il dramma, a. 30, n. 198, 1º February 1954, pp. 60–1.
- Maria Procino Santarelli, Eduardo dietro le quinte. Un capocomico-impresario attraverso cinquant'anni di storia, censura e sovvenzioni (1920-1970), Roma, Bulzoni, 2003.
- Paolo Ricci, Eduardo riapre il San Ferdinando, L’Unità, 18 October 1964.
- Lucio Ridenti, Sono stato da Eduardo, Il dramma, a. 30, n. 202, 1º April 1954, pp. 44–5.
- Paolo Sommaiolo, Il Café-Chantant. Artisti e ribalte nella Napoli della Belle Époque, Napoli, Tempo Lungo, 1998.
- Carlo Trabucco, Eduardo napoletano del mondo ha dato una casa a Pulcinella, L’Avvenire d’Italia, 24 June 1954.
- Giulio Trevisani, De Filippo ha compiuto a Napoli il miracolo del "San Ferdinando", in L’Unità, 15 December 1953.
- Vittorio Viviani, Storia del teatro napoletano, Napoli, Guida Editore, 1969.
