= Night Train to Milan =

- Directed by: Marcello Baldi
- Written by: Marcello Baldi; Elio Bartolini
- Starring: Jack Palance
- Cinematography: Aldo Giordani
- Edited by: Mario Serandrei
- Music by: Carlo Rustichelli
- Release date: 1962
- Country: Italy
- Language: Italian

Il criminale, internationally known as Night Train to Milan, is a 1962 Italian thriller film directed by Marcello Baldi.

A gritty little intrigue thriller with Palance as an ex-nazi doctor in hiding. While riding on a train, he is recognized by passengers who remember him from their prisoner of war camp days. One thing leads to another and when Palance is cornered, he commits murder! He then takes a girl hostage.

== Cast ==
- Jack Palance as Herr Bauer / Schneider
- Yvonne Furneaux as Angela
- Andrea Checchi as De Simone
- Tina Di Carlo as Bauer's mother
- Fanfulla as the host
- Salvo Randone as Capotreno
- Franco Fabrizi as l'uomo snob
- Alfredo Rizzo as Signore pignolo
- Renato Terra as Sottufficiale di polizia
- Enzo Petito as barbone
