= The Hidden Pearl =

2001 film by Marcello Baldi

The Hidden Pearl: The Syrian Orthodox Church And Its Ancient Aramaic Heritage is a 2001 documentary directed by Marcello Baldi. It was commissioned by multiple committees of prominent individuals within the Syriac Orthodox community, including then Patriarch of Antioch, Ignatius Zakka I, and co-produced by Trans World Film Italia and the World Council of Arameans, than known as the Syriac Universal Alliance. The documentary was released as a three-episode miniseries together with three printed volumes.

- Volume 1, The Ancient Aramaic Heritage, deals with the Syriac Christian and Assyrian heritage as the cradle of civilization. It covers the pre-Christian Old Aramaic period, covering the Aramaean city states, the Neo-Assyrian, Achaemenid and Seleucid periods, including the kingdoms of Palmyra, Petra, Edessa and Hatra.
- Volume 2, The Heirs of the Ancient Aramaic Heritage, addresses Middle Aramaic tradition and literature, the Aramaic of Jesus and classical Syriac literature.
- Volume 3, At the Turn of the Third Millennium: the Syrian Orthodox Witness, focuses on and describes the current situation of the Aramean people, the Syriac Orthodox Church and its history in Tur Abdin, Seyfo, and the Aramean diaspora.

== See also ==
- Assyrian people
- Syriac Christianity
