= Il vedovo =

Il Vedovo
- Directed by: Dino Risi
- Written by: Rodolfo Sonego; Fabio Carpi; Sandro Continenza; Dino Verde; Dino Risi
- Starring: Alberto Sordi; Franca Valeri
- Cinematography: Luciano Trasatti
- Edited by: Alberto Gallitti
- Music by: Armando Trovajoli
- Release date: 1959
- Running time: 100 minutes
- Country: Italy
- Language: Italian

Il Vedovo (The Widower) is a 1959 Italian comedy film directed by Dino Risi.

== Plot ==
Alberto Nardi (Alberto Sordi) is a Roman businessman who fancies himself a man of great capabilities, but whose factory (producing lifts and elevators) teeters perennially on the brink of catastrophe.
Alberto is married to a rich and successful businesswoman from Milan, Elvira Almiraghi (Franca Valeri) who has a no-nonsense attitude and barely tolerates the attempts of her husband to keep his factory afloat with her money.
Alberto tries to "keep up" with his wife and her rich and successful friends but he only manages to ridicule himself. Amused by his antics Elvira publicly treats her husband as a silly clown, confident that he'll never leave her in the hope of profiting from her fortune.
One day a train on which Elvira was supposed to be traveling (to pay visit to her old mother) suffers a horrible accident falling off a bridge and no survivors are reported.
Alberto is overjoyed and in a veritable ecstatic rush plans to liquidate most of Elvira's assets, brings his mistress in her country villa and starts dreaming of a bright future only to be frustrated when Elvira appears alive and well: a last-minute phone call from his own accountant and handyman (Marquis Stucchi) prevented her from boarding the doomed train.
Frustration and anger throw Alberto in a nervous breakdown from which he emerges with a diabolic plan: to sabotage the elevator in the city attic he shares with Elvira to have her killed and inherit her fortune for good.
The German engineer working in his factory agrees with Nardi's plan and with the help of unlikely accomplices like Marquis Stucchi and his own uncle (who acts as Alberto's chauffeur) the murderous project is set in motion, with an unintended and tragicomical result.

== Opinion ==
The movie is a splendid example of the commedia all'italiana which Risi directs on an unusually black register where Sordi depicts an outrageously sleazy character (arrogant to his subjects, megalomaniac, a bigoted unrepentant fascist who yet longs for recognition from the businessmen who envies). It is also a period piece, showing the contradictions and miseries lying behind Italy's postwar economic miracle.

== Cast ==
- Alberto Sordi: Alberto Nardi
- Franca Valeri: Elvira Almiraghi
- Livio Lorenzon: Marquis Stucchi
- Leonora Ruffo: Gioia
- Nando Bruno: Nardi's Uncle
- Nanda Primavera: Italia, Gioia's Mother
- Mario Passante: Lambertoni
- Enzo Petito: Fritzmayer
- Ruggero Marchi: Fenoglio
- Gigi Reder: Girondi
- Enzo Furlai: Giordano
- Angela Luce: Margherita
- Ignazio Leone: Doorman
- Alberto Rabagliati: Himself
- Rosita Pisano: Nardi's Secretary

== Censorship ==
When Il Vedovo was first released in Italy in 1959, it was subject to review by the Committee for Theatrical Review of the Italian Ministry of Cultural Heritage and Activities. Before being screened publicly, the Committee recommended the removal of the following: 1) Father Agostino, who took part in the funeral as a priest, is shown sipping a glass of wine; 2) Elvira’s line “She is a fool, an Anita Garibaldi type of fool… but instead of a hero she found my husband.”

The reason for the restriction, cited in the official documents, is because the aforementioned scene was considered immoral and the line running against national reputation and decency.

The official document number is N° 3036; it was signed on 17 Nov 1959 by Minister Domenico Magrì.

== Remake ==
A remake entitled Wannabe Widowed, starring Luciana Littizzetto and Fabio De Luigi, was released in 2013.
