= The Unfaithful Wife =

1969 film by Claude Chabrol

- Film poster
- French: La Femme infidèle
- Directed by: Claude Chabrol
- Screenplay by: Claude Chabrol; Sauro Scavolini
- Story by: Claude Chabrol
- Produced by: André Génovès
- Starring: Stéphane Audran; Michel Bouquet; Michel Duchaussoy; Maurice Ronet
- Cinematography: Jean Rabier
- Edited by: Jacques Gaillard
- Music by: Pierre Jansen; Dominique Zardi
- Production companies: Les Films de La Boétie; Cinegai
- Distributed by: CFDC (France); Cinegai (Italy)
- Release dates: 22 January 1969 (France); 18 February 1969 (Italy)
- Running time: 94 minutes
- Country: France; Italy
- Language: French

The Unfaithful Wife (French: La Femme infidèle) is a 1969 erotic thriller film co-written and directed by Claude Chabrol, starring Stéphane Audran, Michel Bouquet, Michel Duchaussoy and Maurice Ronet. The story follows a businessman (Bouquet) who discovers his wife (Audran) has been unfaithful.

Though initially a box office disappointment, the film was well-received by critics, and was nominated for Best Picture, Best Director, and Best Actor (for Bouquet) by the National Society of Film Critics in the United States. It has been remade twice, as Unfaithful (2002) and Minotaur (2026).

== Plot ==
Insurance broker Charles Desvallées lives in a beautiful house in the countryside near Paris with his wife, Hélène, and their young son. Hélène often goes to Paris, allegedly to shop, get beauty treatments, and watch films. One day, Charles discovers Hélène was not at the hairdresser as she had claimed. He gradually grows more suspicious about the way his wife spends her time and hires a private investigator to follow her. The private investigator informs Charles that Hélène has been seeing a writer named Victor Pégala at his flat in Neuilly-sur-Seine.

On a day Hélène is busy hosting a birthday party for their son, Charles visits Pégala. At first, he tells the confused writer jovially that he and his wife have an open marriage and sits and talks pleasantly with him. Charles then asks Pégala for a tour of the small flat and upon seeing the bed, his demeanor changes. He spots at the bedside the giant cigarette lighter he had given to Hélène on their third anniversary. Charles suddenly grabs a stone bust and kills Pégala with two violent blows to the head. He then meticulously cleans up the crime scenes and removes all his fingerprints. Charles stuffs Pégala's body into his car and throws it into a pond.

In the following days, Hélène appears unwell. Two detectives turn up to interrogate her about Pégala, who has been reported missing by his ex-wife. Hélène's name has been found in Pégala's address book, but she pretends that he had been only a distant acquaintance. In the evening, the detectives return and interrogate both Hélène and Charles, who denies having even heard of the man before.

Later, Hélène finds in her husband's jacket pocket a photograph of Pégala with the victim's name and address on the back. After burning it, she joins her family in the garden, looking tenderly at Charles. When the two detectives show up again, Charles tells Hélène that he loves her and goes to speak to the men. In the last shot, presumably seen from Charles' point of view, the camera moves back from Hélène and their son while zooming in on them, implying that Charles has surrendered to the police.

== Cast ==
- Stéphane Audran as Hélène Desvallées ('Stéphane' in the Italian dub)
- Michel Bouquet as Charles Desvallées
- Michel Duchaussoy as Inspector Duval
- Maurice Ronet as Victor Pégala
- Guy Marley as Inspector Gobet
- Serge Bento as Bignon
- Henri Marteau as Paul
- Louise Chevalier as Marie
- Louise Rioton as Mamy Desvallées
- Stéphane Di Napoli as Michel Desvallées
- Donatella Turri as Brigitte
- François Moro-Giafferi as Frédéric
- Lorraine Rainer as Françoise
- Albert Minski as club owner
- Dominique Zardi as truck driver
- Henri Attal as man in café

== Release ==
Originally scheduled for release in December 1968, the film was released in France by Compagnie Française de Distribution Cinématographique (CFDC) on 22 January 1969.

In the United States, The Unfaithful Wife was quickly picked up by US distributor Allied Artists and premiered in New York on 9 November 1969.

=== Home media ===
Paris-based Tamasa Distribution is set to release "Première Vague" a collection of Blu-Ray discs of seven early films by Chabrol. The box set is set for release in France on November 18, 2025. Variety said that it would include films that were "long unavailable" to the public, including The Unfaithful Wife.

In August 2026, the British Film Institute announced a new 4K restoration.

== Reception ==
Despite generally positive reviews, the film was commercially unsuccessful in France with only 682,295 admissions,

Roger Greenspun of The New York Times called it a "calmly and thoughtfully perverse" film born from a "unique cinematic imagination", and Vincent Canby included it in his "Ten Best" list.

In later years, the critics' opinion was equally positive. Paul Taylor of Time Out magazine titled it "one of Chabrol's mid-period masterpieces, a brilliantly ambivalent scrutiny of bourgeois marriage and murder." Derek Malcolm wrote in The Guardian that "Chabrol displays an irrestistible logic and an ironic humour", and "what could have been just another thriller becomes... also a passionate love story, with its share of intense irony and a pervading sense of the quirkiness of fate." TV Guide called it "arguably the best of Chabrol's superb, Hitchcockian studies of guilt, love, and murder among the French elite", adding that "Michel Bouquet and Stéphane Audran […] give perhaps the finest performances of their careers."

On review aggregator Rotten Tomatoes, the film holds an approval rating of 88% based on 8 reviews, with an average rating of 8.8/10.

=== Influences ===
Reviewers have repeatedly pointed out the influence of Alfred Hitchcock's films on The Unfaithful Wife, in particular Vertigo and Psycho. The last shot of Hélène and their son makes use of the dolly zoom technique first used in Vertigo, while the cleaning of the murder site and the disposal of Pégala's body in the pond have been compared to similar scenes (the cleaning of the bathroom and the sinking of the victim's car) in Psycho. Still, Chabrol denied the notion that his film was in any way "Hitchcockian".

=== Awards and nominations ===
Award	Year	Category	Nominee	Result
National Board of Review	1969	Top Foreign Films		Won
National Society of Film Critics	1970	Best Picture		3rd place
National Society of Film Critics	1970	Best Director	Claude Chabrol	3rd place
National Society of Film Critics	1970	Best Actor	Michel Bouquet	3rd place

== Remakes ==
The film has been remade twice:

- Unfaithful (2002) - An English-language American film released by 20th Century Fox. It was directed by Adrian Lyne, starring Diane Lane and Richard Gere as the leading couple.
- Minotaur (2026) - A Russian-language film, co-produced between French, German and Latvian companies. It was directed by Russian filmmaker Andrey Zvyagintsev. The film notably incorporates the contemporary Russo-Ukrainian war into its narrative. The film premiered at the 2026 Cannes Film Festival, and was selected at the French entry for the Best International Feature Film at the 99th Academy Awards.
