= A Girl... and a Million =

1962 film

- Directed by: Luciano Salce
- Written by: Alberto Bevilacqua; Goffredo Parise; Carlo Romano; Luciano Vincenzoni
- Cinematography: Erico Menczer
- Music by: Ennio Morricone
- Release date: 1962
- Country: Italy
- Language: Italian

La cuccagna, internationally released as A Girl... and a Million, is a 1962 Italian drama film directed by Luciano Salce.

In 2008 it was restored and shown as part of the retrospective "Questi fantasmi: Cinema italiano ritrovato" at the 65th Venice International Film Festival.

== Plot ==
Rossella, a beautiful young girl from a working-class family, looks for a job every day, but is disappointed to not be able to find serious employment. She meets Giuliano, a young student, who, for his part, has the will to avoid finding a job at any cost. After attempting suicide together, they make the choice to live each day without obsessing over work.

== Cast ==
- Donatella Turri: Rossella Rubinacci
- Luigi Tenco: Giuliano
- Umberto D'Orsi: Dott. Giuseppe Visonà
- Liù Bosisio: Diana
- Gianni Dei: Natalino
- Piero Gerlini: Gallery's Owner
- Enzo Petito: Galliano Rubinace, Rossella's father
- Corrado Olmi: Visonà's friend
- Jean Rougeul: Cementi
- Luciano Salce: the Colonel
- Ugo Tognazzi: a driver (cameo)
- Franco Abbina : Rossella's brother
