= Made in Italy (1965 film) =

- Directed by: Nanni Loy
- Written by: Ruggero Maccari; Ettore Scola; Nanni Loy
- Produced by: Gianni Hecht Lucari
- Starring: Sylvia Koscina; Virna Lisi; Anna Magnani; Nino Manfredi; Alberto Sordi; Jean Sorel; Catherine Spaak
- Cinematography: Ennio Guarnieri
- Edited by: Ruggero Mastroianni
- Music by: Carlo Rustichelli
- Release date: 1965
- Running time: 100 minutes
- Country: Italy
- Language: Italian

Made in Italy is a 1965 Italian anthology comedy film directed by Nanni Loy.

== Cast ==
=== Usi e costumi ===
- Lando Buzzanca
- Aldo Giuffrè
- Walter Chiari
- Lea Massari
- Claudio Gora
- Marina Berti
- Renzo Marignano

=== Le donne ===
- Virna Lisi
- Giulio Bosetti
- Catherine Spaak
- Fabrizio Moroni
- Mario Meniconi
- Sylva Koscina
- Jean Sorel

=== Il lavoro ===
- Gino Mucci
- Milena Vukotic
- Aldo Fabrizi
- Nino Castelnuovo
- Mario Pisu
- Enzo Liberti

=== Il cittadino, lo stato, la Chiesa ===
- Nino Manfredi
- Carlo Pisacane
- Gigi Reder
- Carlo Taranto
- Ugo Fangareggi
- Enzo Petito

=== La famiglia ===
- Peppino De Filippo
- Tecla Scarano
- Alberto Sordi
- Rossella Falk
- Claudie Lange
- Marcella Rovena
- Anna Magnani
- Andrea Checchi
- Antonio Casagrande
- Franco Balducci

=== Emigranti ===
- Giampiero Albertini
- Aldo Bufi Landi
- Adelmo Di Fraia
- Renato Terra
