= Claudia Giannotti =

Italian actress (1937–2020)

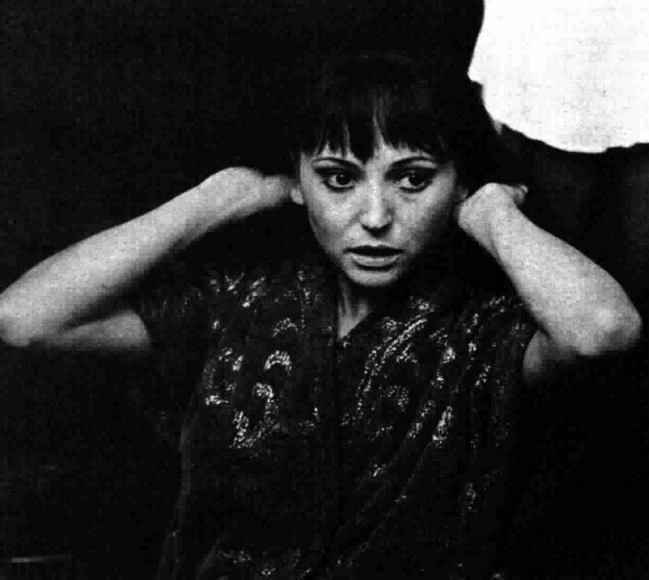
- Born: 19 February 1937; Campobasso, Italy
- Died: 26 July 2020 (aged 83); Turin, Italy
- Occupation: Actress

Claudia Giannotti (19 February 1937 – 26 July 2020) was an Italian film and television actress. She was most well known for having acted with Alberto Sordi.

Born on February 19, 1937, she was involved in film at a young age, beginning with a minor child role at the age of six in the film “Nessuno torna indietro”. She went on to attend the Silvio d’Amico Academy of Dramatic Arts and had her first major theatrical part in 1961 in the film “Il giardino dei ciliegi“.

Giannotti died in Torino on 26 July 2020, aged 83.

== Works ==
=== Films ===
- Nessuno torna indietro, by Alessandro Blasetti (1943)
- Il prof. dott. Guido Tersilli primario della clinica Villa Celeste convenzionata con le mutue, by Luciano Salce (1969)
- Il divorzio, by Romolo Guerrieri (1970)
- La cosa buffa, by Aldo Lado (1972)
- Artemisia - Passione estrema, by Agnes Merlet (1998)
- Amorfù, by Emanuela Piovano (2003)

=== Television ===
- Un certo Harry Brent by Leonardo Cortese (1970)
- Chi?, show combined with Lottery Italy (1976)
- Delitto all'isola delle capre, by Enrico Colosimo (1978)
- Il bello delle donne by Maurizio Ponzi (2000)
- La squadra (various directors) (2004)
- Il mostro di Firenze by Antonello Grimaldi (2009)
