= Petitto =

Petitto is a surname. Notable people with the surname include:

- Giuseppe Petitto (1969–2015), Italian film director
- Laura-Ann Petitto (born c. 1954), American cognitive neuroscientist
- Mickey Petitto, American politician

== See also ==
- Marilyn Petitto Devaney (born 1939), American politician
- Petito
