= Angela Pagano =

Italian actress (1937–2024)

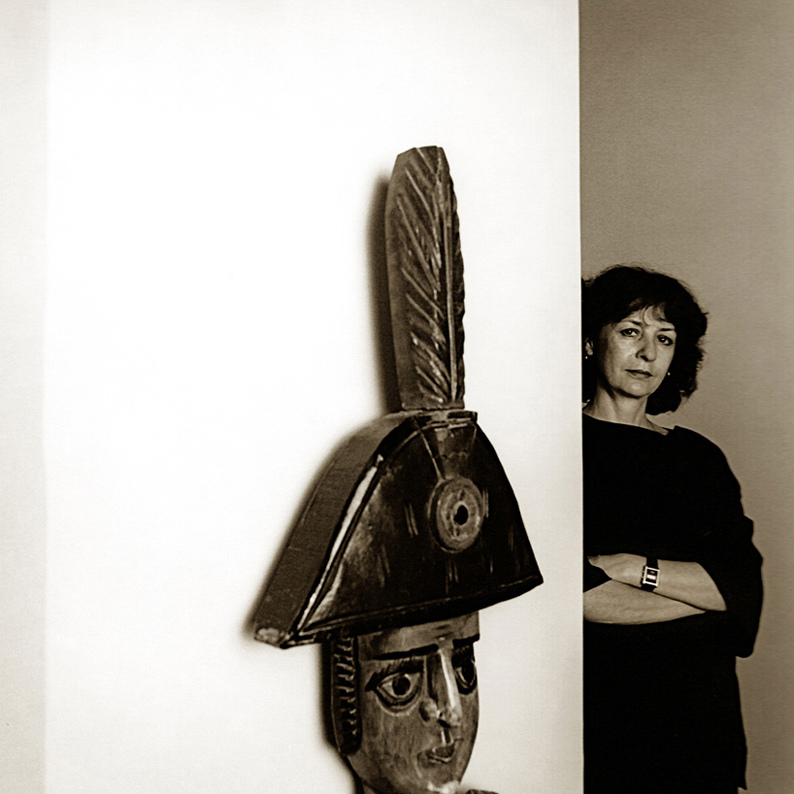
- Pagano photographed by Augusto De Luca in 1987
- Born: 1 April 1937; Naples, Italy
- Died: 6 July 2024 (aged 87); Naples, Italy
- Occupation: Actress

Angela Pagano (1 April 1937 – 6 July 2024) was an Italian actress, whose career spanned over sixty years.

== Life and career ==
Born in Naples, the daughter of a mandolinist, Angela Pagano began performing as a singer when she was just 8 years old, accompanying her father and two other musicians in their street shows.

Mainly active on stage, she made her professional acting debut in 1958, in the theatrical company of Eduardo De Filippo, with whom she stayed for five years. In 1962, she had her breakout, starring in Franca Valeri's play Le catacombe, directed by Giuseppe Patroni Griffi, and later worked in other successful Patroni Griffi works, Napoli: notte e giorno, Napoli: chi resta e chi parte and Persone naturali e strafottenti. She also starred in numerous Peppino De Filippo's plays, and other important theatrical works include Armando Pugliese's Masaniello, Luca De Filippo's La donna è mobile, Antonio Calenda's Madre Coraggio and Roberto De Simone's Le religiose alla moda and Lo Bazariota.

Pagano was also active in films and on television. In 2023, she released an autobiography, Il diario ritrovato ("The rediscovered diary"), and made her last stage appearance at the Teatro San Ferdinando. Her last film credit was Caracas by Marco D'Amore, released in 2024.

Pagano died on 6 July 2024, at the age of 87. She was the sister of the singer and actress Marina Pagano (1939–1990).
