= Alarm Bells =

1949 film

- Spanish film poster
- Directed by: Luigi Zampa
- Written by: Paolo Heusch; Piero Tellini
- Produced by: Carlo Ponti
- Starring: Gina Lollobrigida; Yvonne Sanson; Eduardo De Filippo
- Cinematography: Carlo Montuori
- Edited by: Eraldo Da Roma
- Music by: Nino Rota
- Production company: Lux Film
- Distributed by: Lux Film
- Release date: 16 September 1949
- Running time: 109 minutes
- Country: Italy
- Language: Italian

Alarm Bells (Italian: Campane a martello) is a 1949 Italian drama film directed by Luigi Zampa and starring Gina Lollobrigida, Yvonne Sanson and Eduardo De Filippo.

Location shooting took place on Ischia in the Gulf of Naples. The film's sets were designed by the art director Piero Gherardi. A separate English-language version Children of Chance was produced. It was directed by Zampa but otherwise featured a different British cast of actors. It took around 113 million lira at the box office.

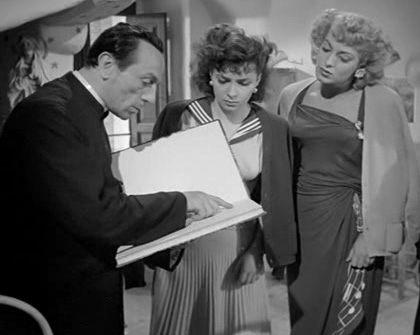
A scene from the film featuring De Filippo, Lollobrigida and Sanson.

== Plot ==
Agostina has been working as a prostitute during World War II, has been sending the money she has saved back to her hometown priest for safekeeping. After the war she returns to the island with her friend Australia, planning to open a clothing shop. However, she discovers that the Priest had been dead a year and his successor believing that the money was a donation has spent it all on an orphanage for those who have lost their parents in the war.

== Cast ==
- Gina Lollobrigida as Agostina
- Yvonne Sanson as Australia
- Eduardo De Filippo as Don Andrea
- Carlo Giustini as Marco
- Carlo Romano as Gendarme
- Clelia Matania as Bianca
- Agostino Salvietti as Mayor
- Ernesto Almirante as Landowner
- Gino Saltamerenda as Butcher
- Salvatore Arcidiacono as The Pharmacist
- Ada Colangeli as Francesca
- Carlo Pisacane as Filippo the altar boy
- Francesco Santoro as Franco
- Vittoria Febbi as Connie
- Pasquale Misiano as Chauffeur

== Production ==
Carlo Romano, Yvonne Sanson, Gina Lollobrigida and Agostino Salvietti, in a scene from the film

It should also be noted that a 27-year-old Mauro Bolognini, among others, worked in the crew as assistant director.

The film, shot in Ischia, was made in a double version, Italian and English, the latter entitled "O.K. Agostina," The English version was scripted by Michael Medwin and starred Patricia Medina, as Agostina, Ivonne Mitchell, as Australia, while Manning Whiley played Don Andrea. The same scenes were played by the Italian actors and then by the English actors. The only actress who played in both versions was the bilingual Clelia Matania.

The scriptwriter Piero Tellini wrote the film inspired by a news story he read in a newspaper. The story turned out to be false when the journalist sued Tellini for plagiarism: in fact, he claimed the rights since he himself had invented the news.

The collaboration between Luigi Zampa and Gina Lollobrigida would result in two more films, including Romana in 1954.

Sanson was almost making her debut (she had worked with Lattuada in Il delitto di Giovanni Episcopo in 1947). The two actresses became friends, so much so that Sanson was Lollobrigida's best main at her wedding when she married Mirko Skofic. In this film, Sanson plays a role in which she mistreats one of the orphans: with irony still Maurizio Ponzi observes that it is "a gesture that the actress will bitterly discount in ten years and more of cinema managed by Raffaello Matarazzo in which the children will be her richest source of anguish and tears."

== See also ==
- Children of Chance (1949)

== Bibliography ==
- Chiti, Roberto & Poppi, Roberto. Dizionario del cinema italiano: Dal 1945 al 1959. Gremese Editore, 1991.
