= Sandro Dori =

Italian film actor (1938–2021)

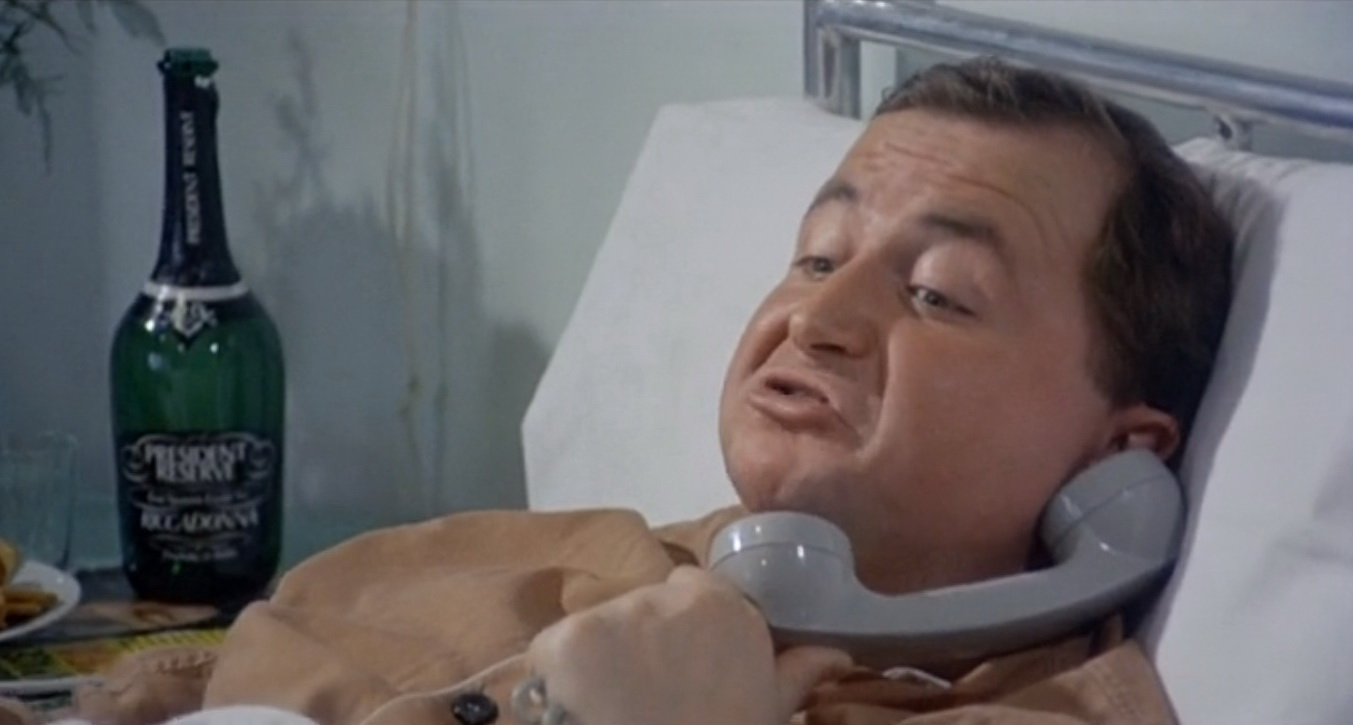
- Dori in Gli infermieri della mutua (1969)
- Born: Alberto Schiappadori; 21 December 1938; Ostiglia, Kingdom of Italy
- Died: 15 February 2021 (aged 82); Civitavecchia, Italy
- Occupation: Actor
- Years active: 1960–2014

Sandro Dori (born Alberto Schiappadori; 21 December 1938 – 15 February 2021) was an Italian film, television and voice actor.

== Biography ==
Sandro Dori began his film career in the early 1960s, alternating between acting in films, theater, and voice acting.

The role that brought Sandro Dori to the attention of the general public was that of Dr. Zucconi in Be Sick... It's Free (The Mutual Aid Doctor), in which he played one of Guido Tersilli's evil colleagues, a role he also played in the sequel Il Prof. Dott. Guido Tersilli, primario della clinica Villa Celeste, convenzionata con le mutue (Prof. Dr. Guido Tersilli, Head of the Villa Celeste Clinic affiliated with the mutual aid societies).

During his career, Sandro Dori worked with directors Dario Argento, Mario Monicelli, Steno, Carlo Vanzina, Pupi Avati, Roberto Rossellini, Vittorio De Sica, Luigi Zampa, Luciano Salce, and Sidney Lumet. In addition, in the first half of the 2000s, he played the role of a monk in an advertisement promoting a brand of syrup.

Dori died on February 15, 2021, at the age of 82; the funeral was held in the church of San Giuseppe di Santa Marinella, in Rome.
