= Shivers in Summer =

1963 film

- Film poster
- Directed by: Luigi Zampa
- Written by: Leonardo Benvenuti; Piero De Bernardi; Age & Scarpelli; Mario Monicelli
- Produced by: Maleno Malenotti
- Starring: Vittorio Gassman
- Cinematography: Marcello Gatti
- Edited by: Eraldo Da Roma
- Music by: Gianni Ferrio
- Release date: 1963
- Running time: 100 minutes
- Country: Italy
- Language: Italian

Shivers in Summer (Italian: Frenesia dell'estate) is a 1963 Italian comedy film directed by Luigi Zampa and starring among others Vittorio Gassman.

== Cast ==
- Vittorio Gassman - Captain Nardoni
- Sandra Milo - Yvonne
- Michèle Mercier - Gigi
- Philippe Leroy - Manolo
- Gabriella Giorgelli - Foschina
- Graziella Galvani - Selena
- Vittorio Congia - the Spanish cyclist
- Livio Lorenzon - Luigi
- Giampiero Littera - Franco
- Umberto D'Orsi - The attorney
- Mario Scaccia - Ugo
- Renzo Palmer - Sandro
- Enzo Garinei - Peppe
- Franco Abbina - Pippo
- Corrado Olmi - Antonio
