= Didi Perego =

Italian actress (1935–1993)

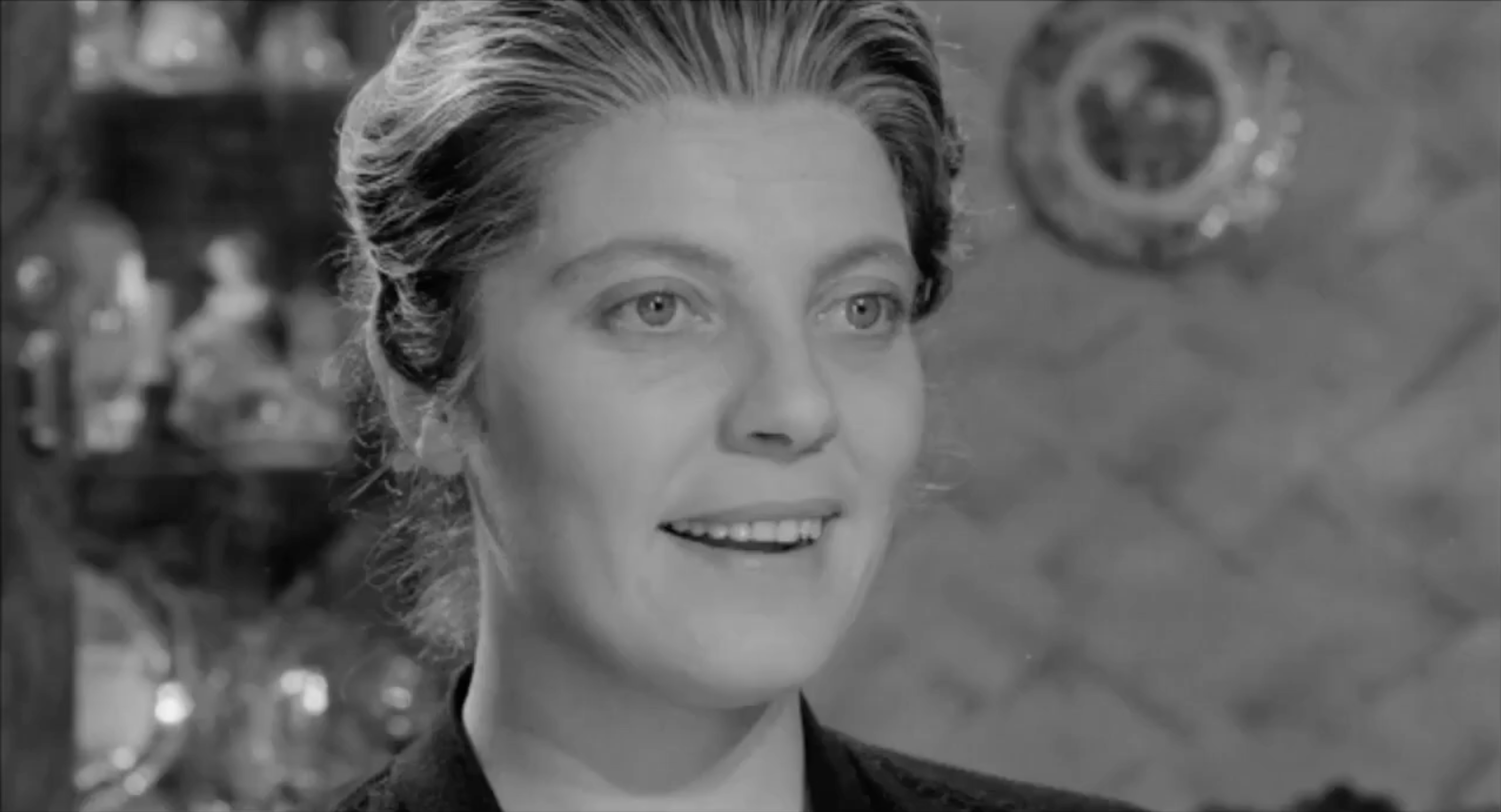
- Perego in the movie The Girl from Parma (1963)
- Born: Aida Perego; 13 April 1935; Milan, Kingdom of Italy
- Died: 28 June 1993 (aged 58); Rome, Italy
- Years active: 1957–1992

Didi Perego (born Aida Perego; 13 April 1935 – 28 June 1993) was a statuesque Italian actress who appeared in more than 80 films and television shows. She made her film debut in 1959's Death of a Friend. The same year, she starred in perhaps her best-known role as Sofia in Kapo. She won the Nastro d'Argento for Best Supporting Actress from the Italian National Syndicate of Film Journalists. She had a major starring role in Mario Bava's Caltiki – The Immortal Monster (Caltiki, il mostro immortale) the same year.

She worked steadily, mainly in Italian productions, while later having a supporting role in Sidney Lumet's 1969 film psycho-drama The Appointment. She also appeared in several British television series including The Avengers, Mr Rose and Man in a Suitcase. Her last screen appearance was in 1992; she died of cancer the following year.

Filmografia Attrice Cinema

Morte di un amico, regia di Franco Rossi (1959).

Kapò, regia di Gillo Pontecorvo (1959)

Caltiki il mostro immortale, regia di Riccardo Freda (1959)

Psicanalista per signora, regia di Jean Boyer (1959)

Tutti a casa, regia di Luigi Comencini (1960)

Mina... fuori la guardia, regia di Armando William Tamburella (1961)

L'onorata società, regia di Riccardo Pazzaglia (1961)

Gli attendenti, regia di Giorgio Bianchi (1961)

Che gioia vivere, regia di René Clément (1961)

Cronache del '22, regia di Giuseppe Orlandini (1962)

Il mio amico Benito, regia di Giorgio Bianchi (1962)

Ultimatum alla vita, regia di Renato Polselli (1962)

Un uomo da bruciare, regia di Paolo e Vittorio Taviani e Valentino Orsini (1962)

I fuorilegge del matrimonio, regia di Paolo e Vittorio Taviani e Valentino Orsini (1963)

Adultero lui, adultera lei, regia di Mario Amendola (1963)

I 4 tassisti, regia di Giorgio Bianchi (1963)

La parmigiana, regia di Antonio Pietrangeli (1963)

Le monachine, regia di Luciano Salce (1963)

Un filo di speranza, regia di François Villiers (1963)

La visita, regia di Antonio Pietrangeli (1963)

Soldati e caporali, regia di Mario Amendola (1964)

Le tardone, regia di Marino Girolami (1964)

Amore mio, regia di Raffaello Matarazzo (1964)

Amore facile, regia di Gianni Puccini (1964)

Lo scippo, regia di Nando Cicero (1965)

La bugiarda, regia di Luigi Comencini (1965)

Ischia operazione amore, regia di Vittorio Sala (1966)

Mano di velluto, regia di Ettore Fecchi (1966)

Il ragazzo che sapeva amare, regia di Enzo Dell'Aquila (1967)

Arriva Dorellik, regia di Steno (1967)

I 2 deputati, regia di Giovanni Grimaldi (1968)

Erotissimo, regia di Gérard Pirès (1968)

Escalation, regia di Roberto Faenza (1968)

Il terribile ispettore, regia di Mario Amendola (1969)

Puro siccome un angelo papà mi fece monaco... di Monza, regia di Giovanni Grimaldi (1969)

La virtù sdraiata, regia di Sidney Lumet (1969)

Portami quello che hai e prenditi quello che vuoi, regia di Philippe de Broca (1970)

Storia di una donna, regia di Leonardo Bercovici (1970)

E venne il giorno dei limoni neri, regia di Camillo Bazzoni (1970)

Cerca di capirmi, regia di Mariano Laurenti (1970)

Sledge (A Man Called Sledge), regia di Vic Morrow (1970)

Ma che musica maestro, regia di Mariano Laurenti (1971)

Darsela a gambe, regia di Philippe de Broca (1971)

Continuavano a chiamarli... er più e er meno, regia di Mariano Laurenti (1972)

Continuavano a chiamarli i due piloti più matti del mondo, regia di Mariano Laurenti (1972)

Racconti proibiti... di niente vestiti, regia di Brunello Rondi (1972)

La lunga notte di Louise, regia di Philippe de Broca (1972)

Il maschio ruspante, regia di Antonio Racioppi (1972)

La vedova inconsolabile ringrazia quanti la consolarono, regia di Mariano Laurenti (1973)

La torta in cielo, regia di Lino Del Fra (1973)

Professore venga accompagnato dai suoi genitori, regia di Mino Guerrini (1974)

I sette magnifici cornuti, regia di Luigi Russo (1974)

La signora gioca bene a scopa?, regia di Giuliano Carnimeo (1974)

Per amare Ofelia, regia di Flavio Mogherini (1974)

Sesso in testa, regia di Sergio Ammirata (1974)

La nuora giovane, regia di Luigi Russo (1975)

L'esorciccio, regia di Ciccio Ingrassia (1975)

Il fidanzamento, regia di Giovanni Grimaldi (1975)

Ridendo e scherzando, regia di Marco Aleandri (1978)

Pierino la peste alla riscossa!, regia di Umberto Lenzi (1982)

Il mondo nuovo, regia di Ettore Scola (1982)

Cicciabomba, regia di Umberto Lenzi (1982)

Juke box, regia di registi vari (1983)

Il segreto dell'uomo solitario, regia di Ernesto Guida (1988)

La trasgressione, regia di Fabrizio Rampelli (1988)

Operazione pappagallo, regia di Marco Di Tillo (1988)

Cattiva, regia di Carlo Lizzani (1991)

Donne con le gonne, regia di Francesco Nuti (1991)

Maledetto il giorno che t'ho incontrato, regia di Carlo Verdone (1992)
