= He Who Hesitates Is Lost =

1960 film directed by Sergio Corbucci

Chi si ferma è perduto
- Directed by: Sergio Corbucci
- Written by: Bruno Corbucci; Luciano Martino; Giovanni Grimaldi
- Produced by: Emo Bistolfi
- Starring: Totò; Peppino De Filippo
- Cinematography: Marco Scarpelli
- Edited by: Dolores Tamburini
- Music by: Gianni Ferrio
- Distributed by: Titanus
- Release date: 1960
- Running time: 97 minutes
- Country: Italy
- Language: Italian

Chi si ferma è perduto is a 1960 Italian comedy film directed by Sergio Corbucci. The title is based on a slogan of Benito Mussolini's regime, literally meaning "who stops is lost".

== Plot ==
Two employees at a Naples company engage in a rivalry to see who can succeed their boss.

== Cast ==
- Totò: Antonio Guardalavecchia
- Peppino De Filippo: Giuseppe Colabona
- Aroldo Tieri: Matteo Rossi
- Luigi De Filippo: Donato Cavallo
- Alberto Lionello: Mario Rossi
- Alberto Talegalli: The client who complains
- Angela Portaluri: Iole Guardalavecchia
- Mario Castellani: Commendatore Amilcare Pasquetti
- Lia Zoppelli: Giulia Pasquetti
- Jacqueline Pierreux: Teresa
- Luigi Pavese: Cesare Santoro
- Anna Campori: Italia
- Pietro De Vico: The waiter
- Renzo Palmer: Cavicchioni
- Marisa Traversi: Adua
- Enzo Petito: Napoleone
