= Roaring Years =

- Film poster
- Directed by: Luigi Zampa
- Written by: Sergio Amidei (story); Ruggero Maccari (dialogue)
- Produced by: Achille Piazzi
- Starring: Nino Manfredi; Gino Cervi; Michèle Mercier
- Cinematography: Carlo Carlini
- Edited by: Eraldo Da Roma
- Music by: Piero Piccioni
- Distributed by: Incei Film
- Release date: 21 April 1962
- Running time: 110 minutes
- Country: Italy
- Language: Italian

Roaring Years (Italian: Gli anni ruggenti) is a 1962 Italian comedy film directed by Luigi Zampa, recasting elements of Nikolai Gogol's The Government Inspector in Fascist Italy in the 1930s under the rule of Benito Mussolini. It stars Nino Manfredi and Gino Cervi.

== Plot ==
The film portrays the corrupt administration of a town in Apulia in 1937, after it has learned, in a roundabout way, of a pending anonymous visit of a government inspector from Rome. The inspector will determine if the administration has adhered to the Fascist government's strict guidelines for economic and social planning.

The threat of the inspection creates terror in the administrators, who fear their misdeeds will be revealed. Most fearful are those guilty of enriching themselves from public funds and other abuses. They resort to pathetic staged measures to make it appear that they remained "honest administrators" and "good fascists".

An unsuspecting insurance agent also coming from Rome, Omero Battifiori, arrives in town for his work and is mistaken for the inspector. He is made the object of every honour and, of course, is utterly deceived. Eventually, the real inspector arrives.

== Cast ==
- Nino Manfredi as Omero Battifiori
- Gino Cervi as Salvatore Acquamano
- Michèle Mercier as Elvira Acquamano
- Gastone Moschin as Carmine Passante
- Salvo Randone as the Anti-fascist doctor De Vincenzi
- Angela Luce as Rosa De Bellis
- Linda Sini as Elsa
- Rosalia Maggio as Nunzia Acquamano
- Giuseppe Ianigro as Nicola De Bellis
- Mario Pisu as Peppino
- Dolores Palumbo as Miss De Vincenzi
- Lino Crispo as Saverio
- Anita Durante as Omero's mother
- Carla Calò as the headteacher's wife
- Annetta Esposito as Giancarla
- Enzo Petito as the Baron
- Mara Maiello as Margherita
- Giulio Marchetti as the stage actor in a Saharan jacket
- Fanfulla as the actor playing an Englishman
- Alfredo Rizzo as the actor playing Menelik

== Production ==
The film was mostly shot in Ostuni, in the province of Brindisi. Principal cinematography started on January 1962.

== Release ==
The film was released on 21 April 1962 and enjoyed moderate success, grossing 500 million lire at Italian box offices. It was re-released in 1970.
