= Children of Chance (1949 film) =

1949 British film by Luigi Zampa

- Directed by: Luigi Zampa
- Written by: Michael Medwin; Piero Tellini
- Produced by: John Sutro; Ludovico Toeplitz
- Starring: Patricia Medina; Yvonne Mitchell; Manning Whiley
- Cinematography: Carlo Montuori
- Edited by: Eraldo Da Roma
- Music by: Nino Rota
- Production companies: Ortus Films; Lux Film
- Distributed by: British Lion Film Corporation
- Release date: October 1949
- Running time: 99 minutes
- Country: United Kingdom
- Language: English

Children of Chance is a 1949 British drama film directed by Luigi Zampa and starring Patricia Medina, Yvonne Mitchell and Manning Whiley. It was written by Michael Medwin and Piero Tellini.

== Synopsis ==
Agostina has made some money in the black market of Rome during the Second World War and sent it back to her hometown priest for safekeeping. However, returning to the island intending to recover the money, she finds that the priest has died and his successor has used it to build an orphanage.

== Cast ==
- Patricia Medina as Agostina
- Manning Whiley as Don Andrea
- Yvonne Mitchell as Australia
- Barbara Everest as Francesca
- Eliot Makeham as Vicar
- George Woodbridge as Butcher
- Frank Tickle as Mayor
- Eric Pohlmann as Sergeant
- Edward Lexy as doctor
- Carlo Giustini as Marco

== Production ==
The film was shot on location in Ischia at the same time as an Italian version, Alarm Bells, also directed by Zampa but with a different cast. Michael Medwin adapted the original Italian screenplay for the English version.

== Reception ==
The Monthly Film Bulletin wrote: "The mixture of comedy and sentiment, with realistic trimmings, is as facile as might be expected from the director of Angelina. In spite of its authentic Italian background, the film has a persistent air of artificiality. Scenes in the Children's Home, presided over by Manning Whiley's ailing priest, are oversentimentalised and stilted, and performances by some delightful-looking Italian children robbed of all charm by the use of dubbed English voices, a fault which also prevents the crowd scenes from making an effect. Patricia Medina is miscast as the heroine, though Yvonne Mitchell acts well as her more abandoned friend."

Kine Weekly wrote: "Juvenile comedy melodrama, made and set in sunny Italy. Dedicated to the illegitimate offsprings of Allied soldiers, its plot turns on the far-from-spontaneous philanthropy of a girl black marketeer. Much of its sentiment is lofty, but its lesson, to say nothing of its entertainment, is hopelessly cramped by uneven characterisation, untidy direction and partly dubbed dialogue. ... The moral of the film is that it is far more blessed to give than to receive, but, in spite of the natural performances by the children, it fails to put its message across. Once it lands on the island of Ischia its main theme is cluttered up with the pomposities of civic big-wigs and laboured commentary on the inconsistency of public opinion."

== See also ==
- Alarm Bells (1949)
