= The Four Monks =

- Italian theatrical release poster
- Directed by: Carlo Ludovico Bragaglia
- Written by: Bruno Corbucci; Giovanni Grimaldi; Gianni Buffardi
- Produced by: Gianni Buffardi
- Starring: Peppino De Filippo; Aldo Fabrizi; Erminio Macario; Nino Taranto
- Cinematography: Enzo Barboni
- Edited by: Giuliana Attenni
- Music by: Armando Trovajoli
- Distributed by: Titanus
- Release date: 1962
- Running time: 100 min
- Country: Italy
- Language: Italian

I 4 monaci (also I quattro monaci), internationally released as The Four Monks, is a 1962 Italian comedy film directed by Carlo Ludovico Bragaglia.

== Plot ==
A group of four petty criminals, hoping to collect some money as a donation, masquerade as refugees monks from Hungary, however, they end up in a convent where they experience fasting and penance.

== Cast ==
- Peppino De Filippo as Fra' Crispino
- Aldo Fabrizi as Fra' Giocondo
- Erminio Macario as Fra' Martino
- Nino Taranto as Fra' Gaudenzio
- Umberto Spadaro as Ortolan
- Luciana Gilli as Daughter
- Roland Bartrop as The Prior
- Nino Terzo as Calogero
- Linda Sini as The pharmacist's wife
- Carlo Taranto as Mafioso Saruzzo Messina
- Franco Ressel as Baron Cimino
- Lidia Martora as Baroness Cimino
- Enzo Petito as Guardiano
