= Angela Luce =

Italian actress and singer (1938–2026)

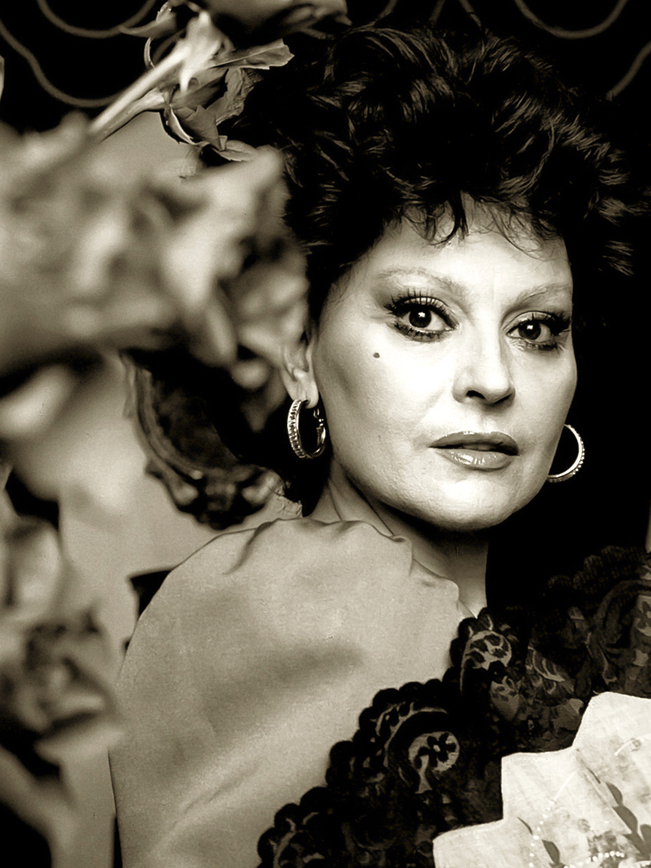
- Luce in 1987, photographed by Augusto De Luca
- Born: Angela Savino; 3 December 1938; Naples, Kingdom of Italy
- Died: 20 February 2026 (aged 87); Naples, Italy
- Occupations: Actress; singer
- Years active: 1953–2015

Angela Savino (3 December 1938 – 20 February 2026), known professionally as Angela Luce, was an Italian film actress and singer of canzone napoletana. She appeared in more 60 films between 1958 and 2005.

Born in Naples on 3 December 1938, she died of heart failure in her native city at the age of 87.

== Partial filmography ==
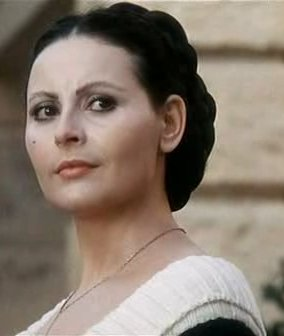
Luce in the movie Addio fratello crudele (1971)

- La sposa (1958) – Margherita
- Avventura a Capri (1959) – Francesca
- Il vedovo (1959) – Margherita
- Le sorprese dell'amore (1959) – Gaspare Florio's Girlfriend
- Ferdinando I, re di Napoli (1959) – Cook in the Royal Palace (uncredited)
- Gastone (1960) – Ivonne
- Gentlemen Are Born (1960) – Prassede
- A noi piace freddo (1960) – Franca
- Letto a tre piazze (1960) – Jeannette
- Toto, Fabrizi and the Young People Today (1960)
- La contessa azzurra (1960) – Donna Zenobia
- Anonima cocottes (1960)
- Caravan petrol (1960)
- Some Like It Cold (1961)
- Pastasciutta nel deserto (1961) – Jolanda
- Che femmina!! E... che dollari! (1961)
- Roaring Years (Anni ruggenti, 1962) – Rosa De Bellis
- Odio mortale (1962) – Conchita
- March on Rome (La Marcia su Roma, 1962) – La contadina
- Divorzio alla siciliana (1963)
- Adultero lui, adultera lei (1963) – La cameriera napoletana
- I ragazzi dell'hully-gully (1964)
- Due mafiosi contro Al Capone (1966) – Santuzza
- For a Few Dollars Less (Per qualche dollaro in meno, 1966) – La donna del Ranch
- Un gangster venuto da Brooklyn (1966) – Marina
- Shoot Loud, Louder... I Don't Understand (Spara forte, più forte... non-capisco!, 1966) – Beautiful Woman
- The Stranger (Lo straniero, 1967) – Madame Masson
- Where Are You Going All Naked? (Dove vai tutta nuda?, 1969) – Prostitute
- Specialists (Gli specialisti, 1969) – Valencia
- Pensiero d'amore (1969) – Countess Stefania Varaldi
- Ma chi t'ha dato la patente? (1970)
- Il debito coniugale (1970)
- Ninì Tirabusciò: la donna che inventò la mossa (1970) – Nando's Woman
- Cose di Cosa Nostra (1971)
- The Decameron (Il decameron, 1971) – Peronella
- Man of the Year (Homo Eroticus, 1971) – Maid
- 'Tis Pity She's a Whore (Addio, fratello crudele, 1971) – Mercante's Governess
- Malicious (Malizia, 1973) – Ines Corallo
- Il gioco della verità (1974)
- Io tigro, tu tigri, egli tigra (1978) – Annalise
- L'immoralità (1978) (uncredited)
- Lo scugnizzo (1979)
- Il Contratto (1981)
- Lacrime napulitane (1981) – Angela Lenci
- Zampognaro innamorato (1983) – Angela Leuci
- Pacco, doppio pacco e contropaccotto (1993) – La madre del professore
- La Chance (1994) – Donna Angela
- Nasty Love (L'amore molesto, 1995) – Amalia / Mother
- La vita, per un'altra volta (1999) – Madre di Marcello
- Terra bruciata (1999) – Assunta – wife of Macrì
- The Three-Legged Fox (2004) – Lucia
- The Second Wedding Night (La seconda notte di nozze, 2005) – Suntina Ricci
- Passione (2010) (archive footage)

== Selected discography ==
=== Albums ===
- 1972 – Angela Luce (Fans GPX 6)
- 1973 – Dedicato a (Fans GPX 8)
- 1973 – Che vuò cchiù (Fans GPX 10)
- 1973 – Dammi un bacio e ti dico... (Fans GPX 11)
- 1974 – Sò palummella cu e scelle d'oro (Hello, ZSEL 55432)
- 1975 – Cin...Cin... Con Sanremo (Hello)
- 1975 – Poesie dette da Angela Luce (Hello, ZMEL 55443)
- 1976 – E a Napule ce sta... (Hello, ZSEL 55446)
- 1976 – Cafè Chantant (Hello, ZSEL 55452)
- 1977 – Comme se canta a Napule (Ricordi, SMRL 6200)
- 1979 – Angela Luce Volume Uno (Fans, ABCD 410 MC)
- 1979 – Angela Luce Volume Due (Fans, ABCD 411 MC)
- 1984 – Ipocrisia (Sirio, BK 00213)
- 1984 – Io per ricominciare (Sirio BL, 75919)
- 1988 – Senza frontiere (Sirio, BL 75955)
- 1995 – Ipocrisia (Phonotype, CD 0044)
- 2004 – I colori della mia vita (CD Polosud Records)
- 2009 – Luce per Totò (CD Polosud Records)
