= Marcello Baldi =

Italian filmmaker (1923–2008)

Marcello Baldi (1 August 1923 – 22 July 2008) was an Italian director and a screenwriter.

== Life and career ==
Born in Telve Valsugana, from 1940 to 1954, Baldi worked as assistant director for, among others, Alessandro Blasetti, Lionello De Felice, Pietro Germi, and Romolo Marcellini. In 1955, he was chosen by CAI to direct the film documentary Italia K2, centered upon the conquest of K2 by the Italian expedition led by Ardito Desio. He later filmed about one hundred of documentaries and more than thirty films.

His last film, Ciso, was directed in conjunction with his son Dario, and won the 2008 Edition of the Festival Internazionale del Cinema di Salerno.

== Selected filmography ==
- Il raccomandato di ferro (1959)
- Venus Against the Son of Hercules (1962)
- Night Train to Milan (1962)
- Saul and David (1964)
- The Great Leaders (1965)
- Countdown to Doomsday (1966)
- The Hidden Pearl (2001)
