= Antonio Petito =

Italian stage actor and playwright (1822–1876)

- Born: 22 June 1822; Naples
- Died: 24 March 1876 (aged 53)
- Occupations: Actor, playwright

Antonio Petito (22 June 1822, in Naples – 24 March 1876) was an Italian stage actor and playwright. He was a notable Pulcinella performer, and an important figure of Neapolitan theater in the 19th century. Petito was the son of another Pulcinella, Petito Salvatore and Donna Peppa. It was his father who initiated him with wearing a mask during a theatrical performance at the Teatro San Carlino in Naples. Petito first performed at the Teatro San Ferdinando in 1831. Petito was not only known for his acting facial expressions, but also for his work as a playwright despite being illiterate. Unable to write well, he used assistants, mostly commonly Giacomo Marulli. After his death, the San Carlino theater remained open for only a short time, having lost its most well known performer.

Neapolitan Carousel is a 1954 Italian comedy film about Antonio "Pulcinella" Petito. In 1982, the RAI dedicated a seven-part television drama, Petito story, to him. He was the great-grandfather of Enzo Petito, a character actor in Sergio Leone classic 1966 Spaghetti Western film The Good, the Bad and the Ugly.
