= José María De Filippi =

Argentine footballer

José María Defilippi
Personal information
- Date of birth: March 26, 1982 (age 44)
- Place of birth: Posadas, Argentina
- Height: 1.80 m (5 ft 11 in)
- Position: Midfielder

Senior career*
Years	Team	Apps	(Gls)
2000–2002	Colón de Santa Fe		
2003	Crucero del Norte	30	(4)
2004–2005	Atlético Candelaria	31	(5)
2005–2007	C.A.I.	41	(2)
2008	Atlanta	7	(0)
2008	Patronato de Paraná	8	(1)
2009–2010	3 de Febrero	35	(3)
2010–2013	Jorge Gibson Brown	32	(5)
2013	Rosamonte Apóstoles	16	(3)
2014	Chaco For Ever	14	(1)
2015	Tigers FC	22	(8)
2016–2017	Sportivo Patria	49	(6)
2018	Stintino	16	(0)
2019	Tigers FC	24	(7)
2020	Atlético Posadas		
2021	A.S.D. SantaCristinese	14	(5)
2022	Canberra Croatia	20	(0)
Total		371	(50)
- * Club domestic league appearances and goals

2023=Canberra croatia

José María Defilippi (born March 26, 1982, in Posadas, Argentina) is an Argentine footballer.

== Teams ==
- (Argentina) Colón de Santa Fe 2000–2002
- (Argentina) Crucero del Norte 2003
- (Argentina) Atlético Candelaria 2004–2005
- (Argentina) C.A.I. 2005–2007
- (Argentina) Atlanta 2008
- (Argentina) Patronato de Paraná 2008
- (Paraguay) 3 de Febrero 2009–2010
- (Argentina) Jorge Gibson Brown 2010–2013
- (Argentina) Rosamonte Apóstoles 2013
- (Argentina) Guaraní Antonio Franco 2013
- (Argentina) Chaco For Ever 2014
- (Australia) Tigers FC 2015
- (Argentina) Sportivo Patria 2016–2017
- (Italy) Stintino 2018
- (Australia) Tigers FC 2019
- (Argentina) Atlético Posadas 2020
- (Italy) A.S.D. SantaCristinese 2021
- (Australia) Canberra Croatia FC 2022
