= Il Prof. Dott. Guido Tersilli, primario della clinica Villa Celeste, convenzionata con le mutue =

1969 film

- Directed by: Luciano Salce
- Written by: Alberto Sordi; Sergio Amidei
- Produced by: Bino Cicogna
- Starring: Alberto Sordi; Ida Galli; Pupella Maggio
- Cinematography: Sante Achilli
- Edited by: Sergio Montanari
- Music by: Piero Piccioni
- Release date: 1969
- Running time: 108 min
- Country: Italy
- Language: Italian

Il Prof. Dott. Guido Tersilli, primario della clinica Villa Celeste, convenzionata con le mutue is a 1969 Italian comedy film directed by Luciano Salce.

It is the sequel of Be Sick... It's Free.

== Plot ==
Former family physician Guido Tersilli has advanced the career ladder through unethical means and now runs private clinic Villa Celeste in Rome. The clinic was built by Tersilli on his mother's advice and with financial backing from his father-in-law, who purchased the land from an order of nuns. As director, Tersilli enforces an aggressive cost-saving policy, prioritizing wealthy patients over those on social health insurance, filling the clinic to capacity through unnecessary surgery, and constantly recycling food and supplies.

To increase the reputation of Villa Celeste, Tersilli hires renowned surgeon Gustavo Azzarini to perform the most complex operations. Azzarini's greed and cynicism surpass even Tersilli's — going as far as to stand idle in the surgery room until his check clears — but his excellent skill and superstar attitude give the clinic the prestige sought. One night, while Tersilli is having an extramarital encounter with a young patient's mother, her child undergoes emergency surgery at the hands of Dr. Cremona, a young, brilliant yet underappreciated surgeon in the Villa Celeste ranks. Realizing Cremona's potential and intending to get rid of Azzarini's cumbersome persona, Tersilli gradually passes his operations over to Cremona, despite making patients believe they were operated by Azzarini and still charging them with Azzarini's fee. When he learns of this, an outraged Azzarini severs ties with Tersilli and hires Cremona as his own assistant.

After attending a party at Tersilli's house, where they realized the extent of his wealth, the clinic staff march into Tersilli's office and demand better working conditions, pay raises and actual employment contracts. When Tersilli refuses, the staff resign and most patients consequently walk out of the clinic. Faced with having to operate on a renal colic to one of the last remaining patients, Tersilli, who lacks any surgical skills, begs his wife to intercede with Azzarini, since he has been suspecting an affair between them. Tersilli's former team, led by Azzarini, arrive at the last minute and save the day, but charge a hefty fee and leave immediately afterwards.

Alone and on the verge of closure, Tersilli is convinced by his mother that real profit comes from "healing the healthy". He therefore converts Villa Celeste into a cosmetic surgery and rejuvenation clinic, dropping all contracts with health insurances and bringing his business back to profitability.

== Cast ==
- Alberto Sordi: Guido Tersilli
- Ida Galli: Anna Maria Tersilli
- Pupella Maggio: Antonietta Parisi
- Claudio Gora: Prof. De Amatis
- Alessandro Cutolo: Valentano
- Ira von Fürstenberg: Dr. Olivieri
- Nanda Primavera: Mother of Guido
- Claudia Giannotti: Dr. Natoli
- Sandro Merli: Dr. Drufo
- Sandro Dori: Dr. Zucconi
- Antonella Della Porta: Mrs. Fabiani
- Laura De Marchi: Nurse
- Lino Banfi: Pharmaceutical sales representative
- Marco Tulli: Doorman
