= De Filippo =

De Filippo and its anglicised variant DeFilippo are surnames of Italian origin. People with those names include:

- Eduardo De Filippo (1900–1984), Italian actor, playwright, screenwriter, author and poet
- Gene DeFilippo (born c. 1952), American sports executive and former college athletics administrator
- Gennaro De Filippo (1816–1887), Italian politician
- Jessica De Filippo (born 2001), Canadian soccer player
- John DeFilippo (born 1978), American football player and coach
- Lou DeFilippo (1916–2000), American football player
- Luca De Filippo (1948–2015), Italian actor and director of theatre
- Luigi De Filippo (1930–2018), Italian actor, stage director and playwright
- Marco De Filippo (born 1990), Italian ice hockey player
- Patrick DeFilippo (1939–2013), American mobster
- Peppino De Filippo (1903–1980), Italian actor
- Rebecca De Filippo (born 1994), Welsh rugby union player
- Titina De Filippo (1898–1963), Italian actress and playwright
- Vincent J. DeFilippo, master doll sculptor with Ideal Toy Company
- Vito De Filippo (born 1963), Italian politician

== See also ==
- De Filippi, a surname
