= Ludovico de Filippi =

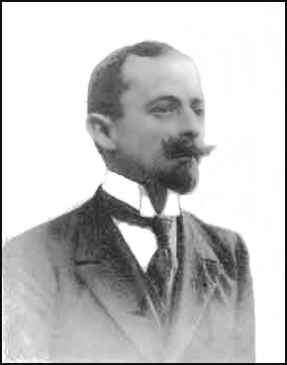
- Lt. Ludovico de Filippi
- Born: 27 September 1872; Turin, Italy
- Died: 16 November 1918; Ližnjan, Croatia
- Occupation: Italian naval officer

Ludovico de Filippi (Turin, 27 September 1872 - Adriatic Sea off Ližnjan, 16 November 1918) was an Italian naval officer and a pioneer of Italian aviation.

He was born on 27 September 1872 and joined the Italian Regia Marina (Royal Navy), in which he attained the rank of capitano di fregata (frigate captain) and received his pilot's license, numbered "5", flying his own airplane Farman in Mourmelon, France, on 4 July 1910. He later became the first head officer of the submarine and aviation department of the Regia Marina. He died on 16 November 1918 while commanding the scout cruiser Cesare Rossarol when she hit a mine and sank on the Istrian Peninsula near the city of Ližnjan (known to the Italians as Lisignano) on the Istrian Peninsula. He was posthumously awarded the Silver Medal of Military Valor for conduct and bravery.
