= Be Sick... It's Free =

1968 film

Be Sick... It's Free (Il medico della mutua)
- Film poster
- Directed by: Luigi Zampa
- Written by: Sergio Amidei; Giuseppe D'Agata; Alberto Sordi; Luigi Zampa
- Starring: Alberto Sordi
- Cinematography: Ennio Guarnieri
- Edited by: Eraldo Da Roma
- Music by: Piero Piccioni
- Release date: 1968
- Running time: 98 minutes
- Country: Italy
- Language: Italian
- Box office: $1.6 million (Italy)

Be Sick... It's Free (Italian: Il medico della mutua) is a 1968 Italian comedy film directed by Luigi Zampa and starring Alberto Sordi. A sequel was made titled Il Prof. Dott. Guido Tersilli, primario della clinica Villa Celeste, convenzionata con le mutue.

In 2008, the film was included on the Italian Ministry of Cultural Heritage’s 100 Italian films to be saved, a list of 100 films that "have changed the collective memory of the country between 1942 and 1978."

== Plot ==
Doctor Guido Tersilli, a young medical graduate in Rome, wants to open his own practice to repay his widowed mother's financial sacrifices. To make money, he joins a health insurance scheme where the more patients he has, the more he earns. However, he faces challenges with patients demanding unnecessary treatments.

With the help of his mother and fiancée Teresa, Guido starts his practice. He gains experience by volunteering in a hospital, impressing the head physician and nursing staff. Guido's aggressive approach to gaining patients, however, creates tension with his colleagues.

In a bid to secure a large number of patients, Guido befriends an elderly doctor, Dr. Bui, and pretends to fall in love with Bui's wife, convincing them to transfer all patients to him. Guido even changes clinics after Bui's death, leaving the widow behind.

Guido's life takes a turn when he meets Anna Maria, a wealthy woman he decides to marry. However, the stress of handling over 3100 patients causes Guido to collapse. Though his colleagues try to claim his patients, Guido recovers and continues his practice from home, instructing his nurse over the phone.

== Cast ==
- Alberto Sordi as Dr. Guido Tersilli
- Sara Franchetti as Teresa
- Evelyn Stewart as Anna Maria
- Nanda Primavera as Tersilli's Mother
- Bice Valori as Amelia, the Widow
- Leopoldo Trieste as Pietro
- Franco Scandurra as Dr. Bui
- Claudio Gora as The Chief Physician
- Pupella Maggio as Mrs. Parise
- Franco Gelli as One of Tersilli's Colleagues
- Tano Cimarosa as Laganà
- Sandro Merli as Dr. Drufo
- Marisa Traversi as The Prostitute
- Sandro Dori as Doctor Zucconi-Colleague in hospital

== Reception ==
The film was the highest-grossing film in Italy of the 1968-69 season, with a gross of more than 1 billion lira ($1.6 million) from 16 key cities.
