= Pupella Maggio =

Italian film actress (1910–1999)

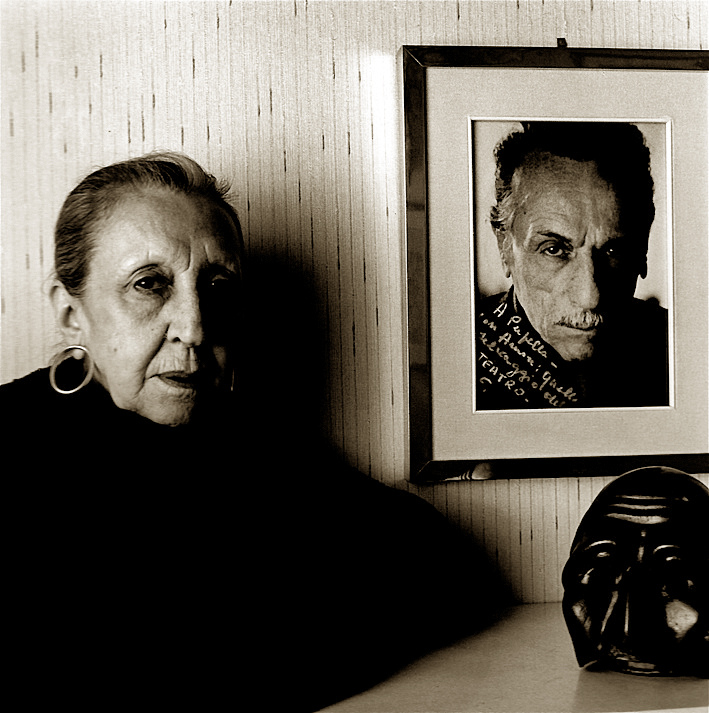
- Pupella Maggio in 1987, photographed by Augusto De Luca
- Born: Giustina Maria Maggio; 24 April 1910; Naples, Kingdom of Italy
- Died: 8 December 1999 (aged 89); Rome, Italy
- Children: Maria Dell'Isola
- Parent(s): Domenico "Mimì" Maggio (father); Antonietta Gravante
- Relatives: Beniamino Maggio (brother); Dante Maggio (brother); Enzo Maggio (brother); Rosalia Maggio (sister)

Pupella Maggio (born Giustina Maria Maggio; 24 April 1910 – 8 December 1999) was an Italian film actress.

== Life and career ==
Born in Naples into a family of actors, Maggio debuted on stage aged twelve years old, as the sidekick of her brother Beniamino. She later worked with several companies, including the ones led by Rina Morelli and by Eduardo De Filippo, where after the death of Titina De Filippo she inherited most of her roles.

She settled in Todi, where she continued to deal with cinema. She was the mother, now elderly, of the main character in Giuseppe Tornatore's 1988 Oscar-winning film Cinema Paradiso . In 1997, she wrote and published her first and only novel, the autobiographical Poca luce in tanto spazio (A Little Light in a Lot of Space) edited by Carlo Grassetti. Maggio also appeared in several films, winning the Nastro d'Argento Award for Best Supporting Actress for her performance in Luigi Zampa's Be Sick... It's Free.

== Filmography ==
Year	Title	Role	Notes
1947	Bullet for Stefano	Marta	
1947	Lost in the Dark		
1954	The Doctor of the Mad		
1958	Mogli pericolose	Aurelia Bertuetti a.k.a. "Lolita"	
1958	Serenatella sciuè sciuè	Tina Paradiso	
1958	Il terribile Teodoro		
1959	La Fortuna Con L'effe Maiuscola		
1959	La duchessa di Santa Lucia		
1959	Il terrore dell'Oklahoma		
1959	Sogno di una notte di mezza sbornia	Filumena	
1960	Anônimas Cocottes		
1960	Mariti in pericolo	Lucia	
1960	Two Women	Peasant	
1960	Caravan petrol		
1960	A Qualcuna Piace Calvo	Marcella's Mother	
1962	The Four Days of Naples	Arturo's Mother	Uncredited
1966	The Bible: In the Beginning...	Noah's Wife	
1968	Be Sick... It's Free	Mrs. Antonietta Parisi	
1971	Il Prof. Dott. Guido Tersilli	Antonietta Parisi	
1972	The Valachi Papers	Letizia Reina	
1973	Amarcord	Miranda Biondi	
1981	Lacrime napulitane		
1988	Cinema Paradiso	Maria (old)	
1988	Days of Inspector Ambrosio	Rosa Cuomo	
1990	Sabato, domenica e lunedì	Zia Memé	
2002	Fate come noi	Giustina	(final film role)
