= Donatella Turri =

Italian actress

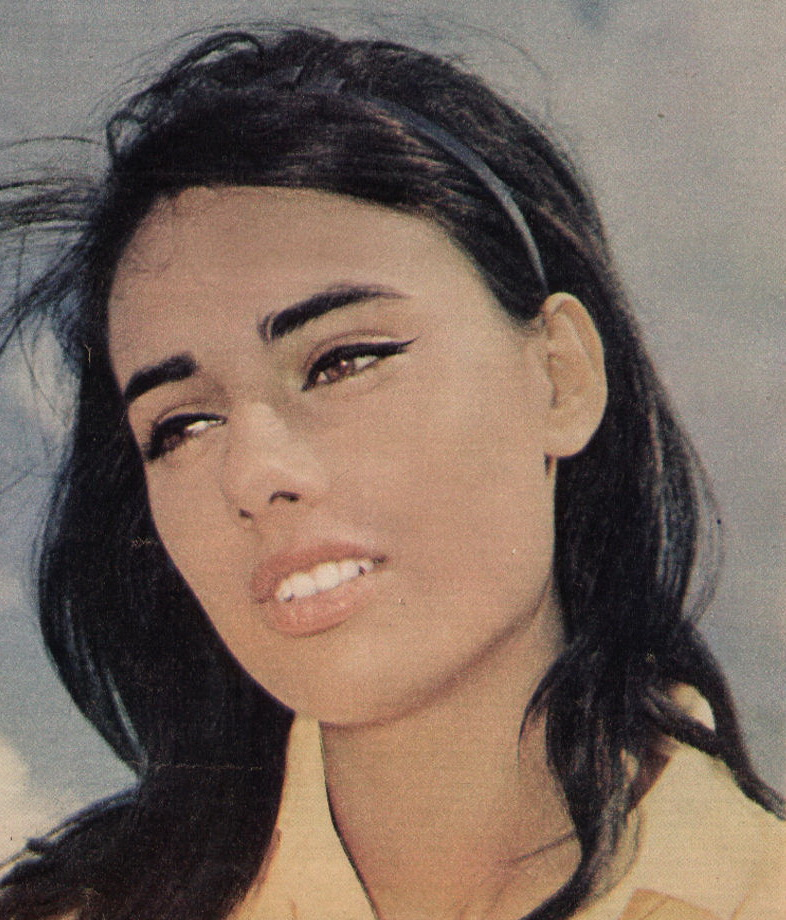
- Born: Maria Donatella Turri Gandolfi; 1945 (age 79–80); Palmanova, Italy
- Occupation: Actress

Donatella Turri (born Maria Donatella Turri Gandolfi; 1945) is an Italian actress.

== Biography ==
Turri was born in Palmanova in 1945.

== Filmography ==
- Les Adolescentes (1960)
- The Passionate Thief (1960)
- Che gioia vivere (1961)
- A Girl... and a Million (1962) as Rossella Rubinacci
- Le gendarme se marie (1968)
- La Femme infidèle (1969)
