= Me, Me, Me... and the Others =

1966 film

- Film poster
- Directed by: Alessandro Blasetti
- Written by: Alessandro Blasetti
- Produced by: Luigi Rovere
- Starring: Gina Lollobrigida
- Cinematography: Aldo Giordani
- Edited by: Tatiana Casini Morigi
- Music by: Carlo Rustichelli
- Release date: 16 February 1966
- Running time: 95 minutes
- Country: Italy
- Language: Italian

Me, Me, Me... and the Others (Italian: Io, io, io... e gli altri) is a 1966 Italian comedy film directed by Alessandro Blasetti. For this film Blasetti won the David di Donatello for best director.

== Cast ==
- Gina Lollobrigida - Titta
- Silvana Mangano - Silvia
- Walter Chiari - Sandro
- Vittorio De Sica - Commendator Trepossi
- Nino Manfredi - 'Millevache'
- Marcello Mastroianni - Peppino Marassi
- Caterina Boratto - Luigia, Peppino's Sister-in-law
- Vittorio Caprioli - Politician
- Elisa Cegani - Peppino's Housekeeper
- Andrea Checchi - Praying Man
- Umberto D'Orsi - Man in Train
- Graziella Granata - Girl on the Train
- Marisa Merlini - Lady on the telephone
- Paolo Panelli - Photographer
- Mario Pisu - Winner of the 'Capranica'
- Salvo Randone - Traveller with a menu
- Luisa Rivelli - Lady dancing
- Maria Grazia Spina - Peppino's Niece
- Saro Urzì - 2nd Praying Man
- Franca Valeri - Journalist
- Sylva Koscina - The 'Star'
- Marina Malfatti - Dancer
- Mario Scaccia - Journalist
- Lelio Luttazzi - Director
- Carlo Croccolo - Man in Train
