= Armando Curcio =

Italian publisher, journalist and writer (1900–1957)

Armando Curcio (25 May 1900, Naples - 25 November 1957, Rome) was an Italian playwright, poet, journalist, editor, and publisher.

== Life and career ==
Born in 1900, Armando Curcio was from a prominent family in Naples where he was educated as a lawyer. In 1918 his first book of poetry, Coriandoli, was published. In 1927 he founded the publisher Istituto Editoriale Moderno (now Armando Curcio Editore), which was known for its publications of encyclopedias, fascicles, and narrative works. He also founded the publisher Casa Editrice Sunland in Milan in 1929; a publishing house that specialized in humorous works and literature meant to entertain.

Curcio's first play, Lionello e l'amore, was staged at the Teatro Eden in Milan in 1927. He left Milan for his native city of Naples where he lived again during World War II. During the war years he worked as a playwright; producing many Neapolitan comedies that later were adapted into films, including A che servono questi quattrini, Ci Penso io, Le Barche vanno da sole, I casi sono due, La fortuna con l'effe maiuscola (in collaboration with Eduardo De Filippo), Casanova farebbe così (with Peppino De Filippo), C'era una volta un compagno di scuola, and Basta il succo al limone. He continued to write plays in the decade after the war, including Tarantella Napoletana, Funicoli funiculà, L'onesto venditore di uccelli, Giuseppe, and Lo strano caso di Salvatore Cecere.

Curcio died in 1957. He was the father of actor Dino Curcio.
