= Luigi Zampa =

Italian film director (1905–1991)

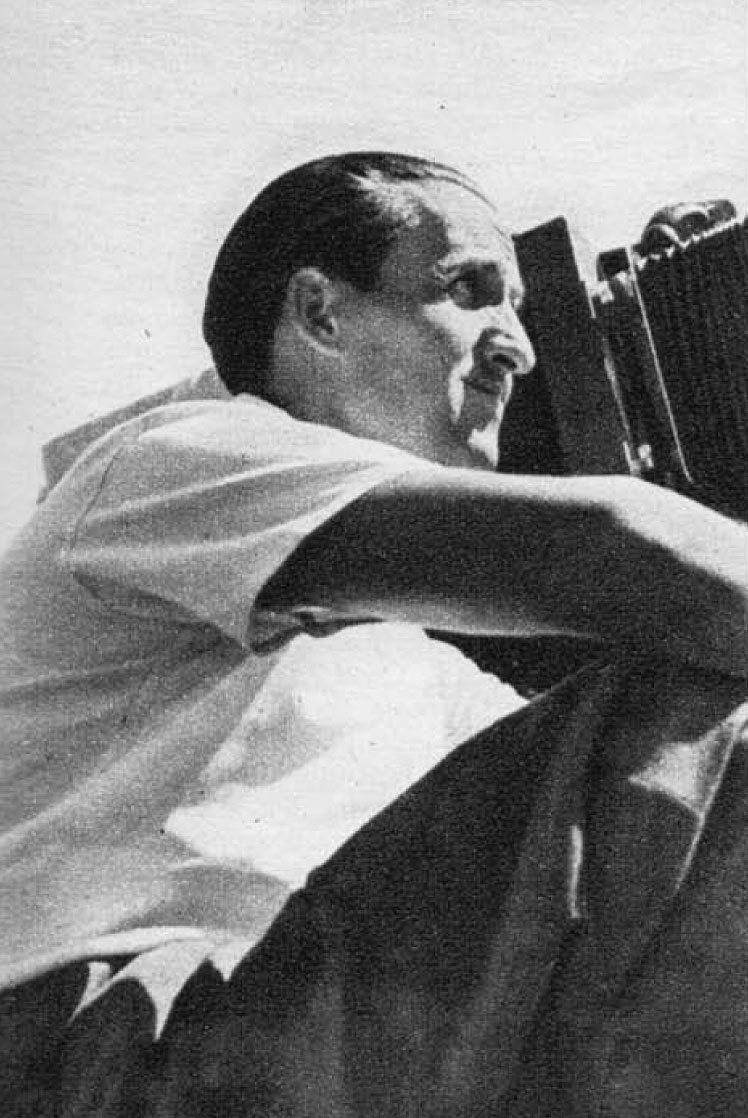
- Luigi Zampa in 1952
- Born: 2 January 1905; Rome, Italy
- Died: 16 August 1991 (aged 86); Rome, Italy
- Occupation: Film director
- Years active: 1933–1979

Luigi Zampa (2 January 1905 – 16 August 1991) was an Italian film director.

== Biography ==
Son of a worker, Zampa studied filmmaking from 1932 to 1937 at the Italian film school Centro sperimentale di cinematografia in Rome.

He directed several Italian neorealism films in the 1940s. In 1949, he filmed Alarm Bells on Ischia, and also shot a separate British version under the title Children of Chance.

During the 1950s and 1960s, he became a director of several successful films belonging to the Commedia all'italiana genre, some starring Alberto Sordi. Sordi and Zampa made A Girl in Australia (1971) in Australia.

== Filmography ==
=== as director ===
- 1933 Risveglio di una città
- 1941 L'attore scomparso
- 1942 C'è sempre un ma!
- 1942 The Adventures of Fra Diavolo (Fra' Diavolo)
- 1942 Signorinette
- 1945 L'abito nero da sposa
- 1946 A Yank in Rome (Un Americano in vacanza)
- 1947 To Live in Peace (Vivere in pace)
- 1947 L'onorevole Angelina
- 1948 Difficult Years (Anni difficili)
- 1949 Alarm Bells (Campane a martello)
- 1949 Children of Chance
- 1950 The White Line (Cuori senza frontiere)
- 1951 Rome-Paris-Rome (Signori, in carrozza!)
- 1951 His Last Twelve Hours (È più facile che un cammello...)
- 1952 The City Stands Trial (Processo alla città)
- 1953 We, the Women (Siamo donne) episode Isa Miranda
- 1953 Easy Years (Anni facili)
- 1954 Of Life and Love (Questa è la vita)
- 1955 Woman of Rome (La Romana)
- 1955 The Art of Getting Along (L'arte di arrangiarsi)
- 1955 Girls of Today (Ragazze d'oggi)
- 1958 Ladro lui, ladra lei
- 1958 The Love Specialist (La ragazza del palio)
- 1959 The Magistrate (Il magistrato)
- 1960 The Traffic Policeman (Il vigile)
- 1962 Roaring Years (Gli anni ruggenti)
- 1963 Shivers in Summer (Frenesia dell'estate)
- 1965 A Question of Honour (Una questione d'onore)
- 1966 Il Marito di Olga, episode of Our Husbands
- 1967 Anyone Can Play (Le dolci signore)
- 1968 Be Sick... It's Free (Il medico della mutua)
- 1970 Let's Have a Riot (Contestazione generale)
- 1971 A Girl in Australia (Bello, onesto, emigrato Australia sposerebbe compaesana illibata)
- 1973 Hospitals: The White Mafia (Bisturi, la mafia bianca)
- 1975 The Flower in His Mouth (Gente di rispetto)
- 1977 Il mostro
- 1979 Tigers in Lipstick (Letti selvaggi)

=== script only ===
- Un mare di guai (1939)
- A Thousand Lire a Month (1939)
- Dora Nelson (1939)
- One Hundred Thousand Dollars (1940)
