= List of best-selling singles in Italy =

The following is a list of the best-selling singles in Italy. Depends on the measurement, list is divided by claimed sales and official certifications from FIMI, which online base operates since 2009.

According to a 1969 report from SEDRIM (from Società per l'Esercizio dei Diritti di Riproduzione Meccanica), then Italian mechanical rights society, Italy was a singles-market with songs accounting 85.8 percent of total record sales in the country. A "top hit" single in Italy at that time was grouped between 500,000 and 700,000 copies.

== List of best-selling singles by claimed sales ==
=== Over 1 million copies ===
Year	Artist	Title	Sales
1980	Pino D'Angiò	"Ma quale idea"	2,500,000
1964	Bobby Solo	"Una lacrima sul viso"	1,700,000
1967	I Camaleonti	"L'ora dell'amore"	1,500,000
1969	Mario Tessuto	"Lisa dagli occhi blu"	1,500,000
1973	Patty Pravo	"Pazza idea"	1,500,000
1964	Paul Anka	"Ogni volta"	1,500,000
1958	Domenico Modugno	"Nel blu, dipinto di blu" (aka "Volare")	1,000,000
1961	Adriano Celentano	"24.000 baci"	1,000,000
1968	Adriano Celentano	"La Coppia Piu' Bella Del Mondo"	1,000,000
1967	Albano Carrisi	"Nel Sole"	1,000,000
1967	Fausto Leali	"A Chi"	1,000,000
1979	Alan Sorrenti	"Tu sei l'unica donna per me"	1,000,000
1964	Gianni Morandi	"In ginocchio da te"	1,000,000
1970	Gianni Morandi	"Scende la pioggia"	1,000,000
1977	Grace Jones	"La Vie en rose"	1,000,000
1968	Patty Pravo	"La bambola"	1,000,000
1967	Little Tony	"Cuore matto"	1,000,000
1977	Umberto Tozzi	"Ti amo"	1,000,000

=== 0.5–0-9 million copies ===
Year	Artist	Title	Sales
1963	Adriano Celentano	"Stai lontana da me"	900,000
1968	I Camaleonti	"Applausi"	900,000
1964	Gigliola Cinquetti	"Non Ho L'Eta"	850,000
1965	Franco Tozzi	"'I Tuoi Occhi Verdi"	800,000
1976	Main theme song	"Sandokan"	800,000
1966	The Rokes	"Piangi Con Me"	800,000
1965	Nini Rosso	"Il Silenzio"	750,000
1966	Adriano Celentano	"Pregheró"	700,000
1970	Gianni Morandi	"Belinda"	700,000
1969	Georges Moustaki	"Lo Straniero"	700,000
1967	Gianni Morandi	"Un Mondo D'Amore"	700,000
1968	Patty Pravo	"Gli occhi dell'amore/Sentimento"	700,000
1981	Ricchi e Poveri	"Sarà perché ti amo"	700,000
1980	Riccardo Fogli	"Malinconia"	650,000
1967	Antoine	"Pietre"	600,000
1965	Jimmy Fontana	"La Mia Serenata"	600,000
1969	Nada	"Ma che freddo fa"	600,000
1967	Rocky Roberts	"Stasera Mi Butto"	600,000
1968	Riccardo Del Turco	"Luglio"	511,035
1982	Cristina D'Avena	"Canzone dei puffi"	500,000
1968	Aphrodite's Child	"Rain and Tears"	500,000
1966	Adriano Celentano	"Il Ragazzo Della Via Gluck"	500,000
1999	Jova-Liga-Pelù	"Il mio nome è mai più"	500,000
1976	Bruno Lauzi	"La Tartaruga"	500,000
1980	Miguel Bose	"Olympic Games"	500,000
1960	Nico Fidenco	"Un Granello Di Sabbia"	500,000
1980	Pupo	"Su Di Noi"	500,000

== Highest certified singles in Italy (since 2009) ==
as of 2024
Year	Artist	Title	Certifications	Certified sales
2023	Lazza	"Cenere"	9× Platinum	900,000^{‡}
2020	Pinguini Tattici Nucleari	"Pastello bianco"	8× Platinum	800,000^{‡}
2022	Mahmood & Blanco	"Brividi"	8× Platinum	800,000^{‡}
2022	Bizarrap & Quevedo	"Quevedo: Bzrp Music Sessions, Vol. 52"	8× Platinum	800,000^{‡}
2020	Ernia	"Superclassico"	7× Platinum	700,000^{‡}
2022	Dargen D'Amico	"Dove si balla"	7× Platinum	700,000^{‡}
2022	Pinguini Tattici Nucleari	"Giovani Wannabe"	7× Platinum	700,000^{‡}
2022	Rhove	"Shakerando"	7× Platinum	700,000^{‡}
2020	Pinguini Tattici Nucleari	"Ridere"	6× Platinum	600,000^{‡}
2023	The Kolors	"Italodisco"	6× Platinum	600,000^{‡}
2023	Annalisa	"Mon amour"	6× Platinum	600,000^{‡}
2023	Marco Mengoni	"Due vite"	6× Platinum	600,000^{‡}
2018	Lady Gaga & Bradley Cooper	"Shallow"	6× Platinum	600,000^{‡}
2018	Lewis Capaldi	"Someone You Loved"	6× Platinum	600,000^{‡}
2019	The Weeknd	"Blinding Lights"	6× Platinum	600,000^{‡}
2012	Tom Odell	"Another Love"	6× Platinum	600,000^{‡}
2021	Rkomi, Sfera Ebbasta & Junior K	"Nuovo Range"	6× Platinum	600,000^{‡}
2022	Sangiovanni	"Farfalle"	6× Platinum	600,000^{‡}
2022	Pinguini Tattici Nucleari	"Ricordi"	5× Platinum	500,000^{‡}
2022	Annalisa	"Bellissima"	5× Platinum	500,000^{‡}
2024	Mahmood	"Tuta gold"	5× Platinum	500,000^{‡}
1984	a-ha	"Take On Me"	Gold (AFI) & 2× Platinum (FIMI)	500,000^{‡}
2023	Ava, Anna & Capo Plaza	"Vetri neri"	5× Platinum	500,000^{‡}
2015	Baby K feat. Giusy Ferreri	"Roma-Bangkok"	Diamond	500,000^{‡}
2017	Ed Sheeran	"Shape of You"	Diamond	500,000^{‡}
2021	Blanco	"Finché non mi seppelliscono"	5× Platinum	500,000^{‡}
2024	Coldplay	"Viva la Vida"	5× Platinum	500,000^{‡}
2022	Fedez, Tananai & Mara Sattei	"La Dolce Vita"	5× Platinum	500,000^{‡}
2020	Gazelle	"Destri"	5× Platinum	500,000^{‡}
2022	James Hype & Miggy Dela Rosa	"Ferrari"	5× Platinum	500,000^{‡}
2017	Luis Fonsi	"Despacito"	Diamond	500,000^{‡}
2022	Rkomi & Elodie	"La coda del diavolo"	5× Platinum	500,000^{‡}
2023	Tananai	"Tango"	5× Platinum	500,000^{‡}
2020	The Weeknd	"Save Your Tears"	5× Platinum	500,000^{‡}
2020	Pinguini Tattici Nucleari	"Scrivile scemo"	5× Platinum	500,000^{‡}

=== Pre-FIMI certification ===
Year	Artist	Title	Certifications	Certified sales
1966	Caterina Caselli	"Nessuno mi può giudicare"	1,000,000	Gold certification

== See also ==
- List of best-selling singles
- List of best-selling singles by country
- List of best-selling albums in Italy
- Federazione Industria Musicale Italiana (FIMI)
- Music of Italy
- List of estimated best-selling Italian music artists
