= List of number-one hits of 2022 (Italy) =

This is a list of the number-one hits of 2022 on Italy's Singles and Albums Charts, ranked by the Federazione Industria Musicale Italiana (FIMI).

== Chart history ==
Week	Song	Artist(s)	Ref.	Album	Artist(s)	Ref.
1	"∞ Love"	Marracash and Gué Pequeno		Noi, loro, gli altri	Marracash	
2	"Solite pare"	Sick Luke, Tha Supreme and Sfera Ebbasta		X2	Sick Luke	
3	"Solite pare"	Sick Luke, Tha Supreme and Sfera Ebbasta		Virus	Noyz Narcos	
4	"La coda del diavolo"	Rkomi and Elodie		X2	Sick Luke	
5	"Brividi"	Mahmood and Blanco		Taxi Driver	Rkomi	
6	"Brividi"	Mahmood and Blanco		Taxi Driver	Rkomi	
7	"Brividi"	Mahmood and Blanco		Blu celeste	Blanco	
8	"Brividi"	Mahmood and Blanco		Ritorno al futuro/Back to the Future	Elisa	
9	"Brividi"	Mahmood and Blanco		Il giorno in cui ho smesso di pensare	Irama	
10	"Brividi"	Mahmood and Blanco		Oro blu	Bresh	
11	"Brividi"	Mahmood and Blanco		Salvatore	Paky	
12	"Brividi"	Mahmood and Blanco		Caos	Fabri Fibra	
13	"Brividi"	Mahmood and Blanco		Caos	Fabri Fibra	
14	"Brividi"	Mahmood and Blanco		Dove volano le aquile	Luchè	
15	"Piove"	Lazza and Sfera Ebbasta		Sirio	Lazza	
16	"Shakerando"	Rhove		Sirio	Lazza	
17	"Shakerando"	Rhove		Sirio	Lazza	
18	"Shakerando"	Rhove		Sirio	Lazza	
19	"Shakerando"	Rhove		Sirio	Lazza	
20	"Shakerando"	Rhove		Eclissi	Gemitaiz	
21	"Shakerando"	Rhove		Harry's House	Harry Styles	
22	"Shakerando"	Rhove		Blocco 181	Various artists	
23	"La dolce vita"	Fedez, Tananai and Mara Sattei		Strangis	Luigi Strangis	
24	"La dolce vita"	Fedez, Tananai and Mara Sattei		Non siamo soli	Alex W	
25	"La dolce vita"	Fedez, Tananai and Mara Sattei		Sirio	Lazza	
26	"La dolce vita"	Fedez, Tananai and Mara Sattei		Sirio	Lazza	
27	"La dolce vita"	Fedez, Tananai and Mara Sattei		Sirio	Lazza	
28	"La dolce vita"	Fedez, Tananai and Mara Sattei		Sirio	Lazza	
29	"S!r!"	Tha Supreme featuring Lazza and Sfera Ebbasta		Sirio	Lazza	
30	"La dolce vita"	Fedez, Tananai and Mara Sattei		Sirio	Lazza	
31	"La dolce vita"	Fedez, Tananai and Mara Sattei		Sirio	Lazza	
32	"La dolce vita"	Fedez, Tananai and Mara Sattei		Sirio	Lazza	
33	"La dolce vita"	Fedez, Tananai and Mara Sattei		Sirio	Lazza	
34	"La dolce vita"	Fedez, Tananai and Mara Sattei		Sirio	Lazza	
35	"Giovani Wannabe"	Pinguini Tattici Nucleari		Will of the People	Muse	
36	"Giovani Wannabe"	Pinguini Tattici Nucleari		Sirio	Lazza	
37	"Ferrari"	James Hype and Miggy Dela Rosa featuring Lazza		Sirio	Lazza	
38	"Ferrari"	James Hype and Miggy Dela Rosa featuring Lazza		Botox	Night Skinny	
39	"Ferrari"	James Hype and Miggy Dela Rosa featuring Lazza		Botox	Night Skinny	
40	"Ricordi"	Pinguini Tattici Nucleari		Carattere speciale	Tha Supreme	
41	"The Loneliest"	Måneskin		Carattere speciale	Tha Supreme	
42	"Ricordi"	Pinguini Tattici Nucleari		Carattere speciale	Tha Supreme	
43	"The Loneliest"	Måneskin		Midnights	Taylor Swift	
44	"Quevedo: Bzrp Music Sessions, Vol. 52"	Bizarrap and Quevedo		Carattere speciale	Tha Supreme	
45	"Quevedo: Bzrp Music Sessions, Vol. 52"	Bizarrap and Quevedo		Trenches Baby	Rondodasosa	
46	"Quevedo: Bzrp Music Sessions, Vol. 52"	Bizarrap and Quevedo		Il mondo è nostro	Tiziano Ferro	
47	"Quevedo: Bzrp Music Sessions, Vol. 52"	Bizarrap and Quevedo		Io non ho paura	Ernia	
48	"Alleluia"	Shiva featuring Sfera Ebbasta		Milano Demons	Shiva	
49	"Quevedo: Bzrp Music Sessions, Vol. 52"	Bizarrap and Quevedo		Fake News	Pinguini Tattici Nucleari	
50	"Quevedo: Bzrp Music Sessions, Vol. 52"	Bizarrap and Quevedo		Fake News	Pinguini Tattici Nucleari	
51	"Quevedo: Bzrp Music Sessions, Vol. 52"	Bizarrap and Quevedo		Sirio	Lazza	
52	"All I Want for Christmas Is You"	Mariah Carey		Fake News	Pinguini Tattici Nucleari	

== See also ==
- 2022 in music
- List of number-one hits in Italy
