= Corrado Francia =

Italian singer (1947–2021)

- Born: 7 February 1947; Terni, Italy
- Died: 8 February 2021 (aged 74); Terni, Italy
- Occupation: Singer

Corrado Francia (7 February 1947 – 8 February 2021) was an Italian singer.

== Biography ==
Francia began singing at a young age, participating in competitions in Umbria, which helped him earn notability and sign with Fonit Cetra. In 1967, he participated in the 4th Mediterranean Song Festival in Barcelona. That same year, he appeared on the television show Settevoci. In 1968, he collaborated with Carmen Villani, Marisa Sannia, and Claudio Villa to record an album featuring songs performed at the Sanremo Music Festival 1968. He also participated in the Un disco per l'estate that year. After 1968, he mostly focused on singing locally and participating in very few events. In 2008, he performed in the Cantamaggio ternano in Terni with the piece Nun basta armette Maggiu.

Corrado Francia died in Terni on 8 February 2021, at the age of 74, one day after his birthday.

== Discography ==
=== Albums ===
- San Remo '68 (1968)

=== Singles ===
- Potessi credere/Non è una cosa facile (1967)
- (What Good Am I) Un giorno d'amore/Gli uomini (1968)
- La bocca e gli occhi/Noi due sulla sabbia (1968)
