= List of estimated best-selling Italian music artists =

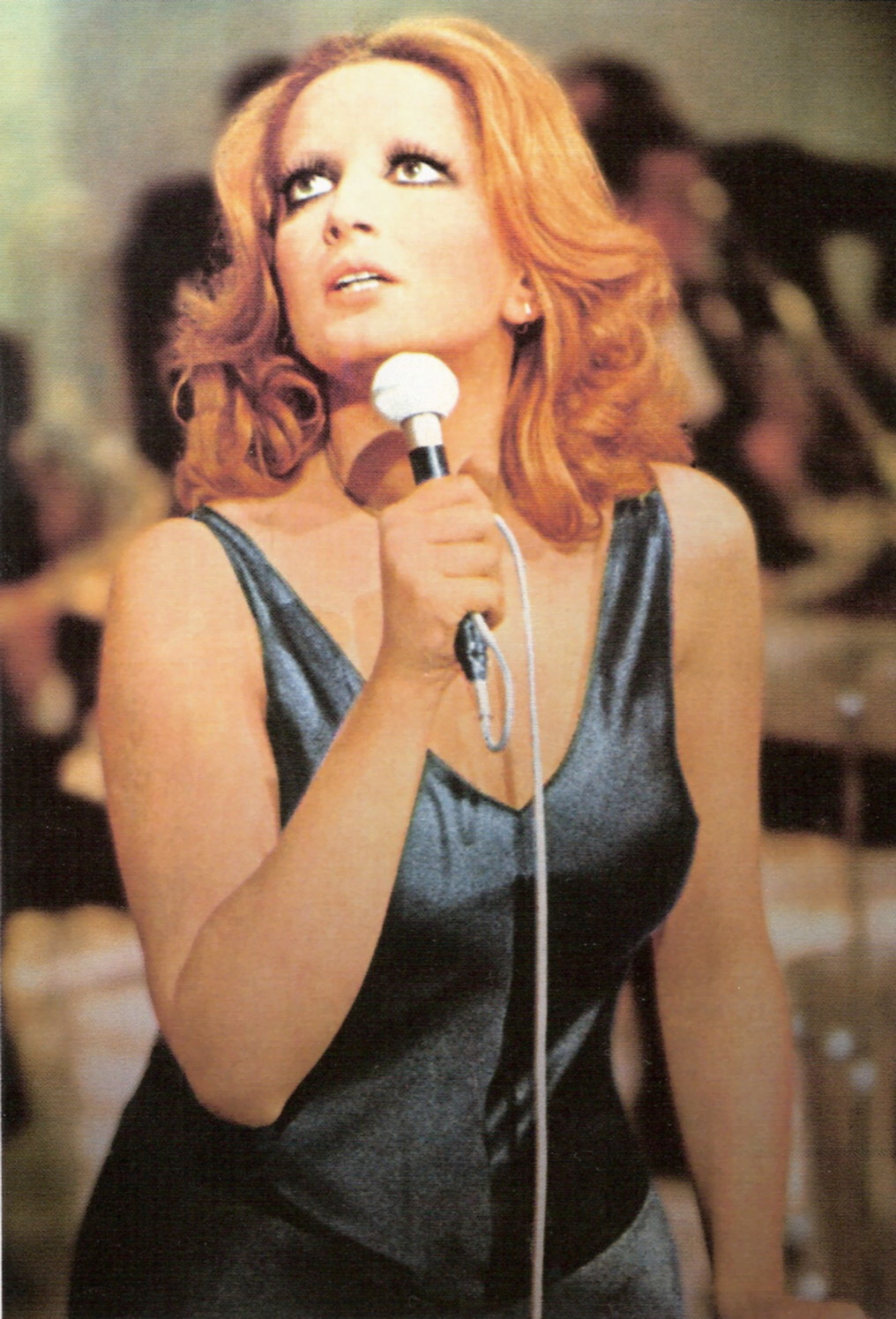
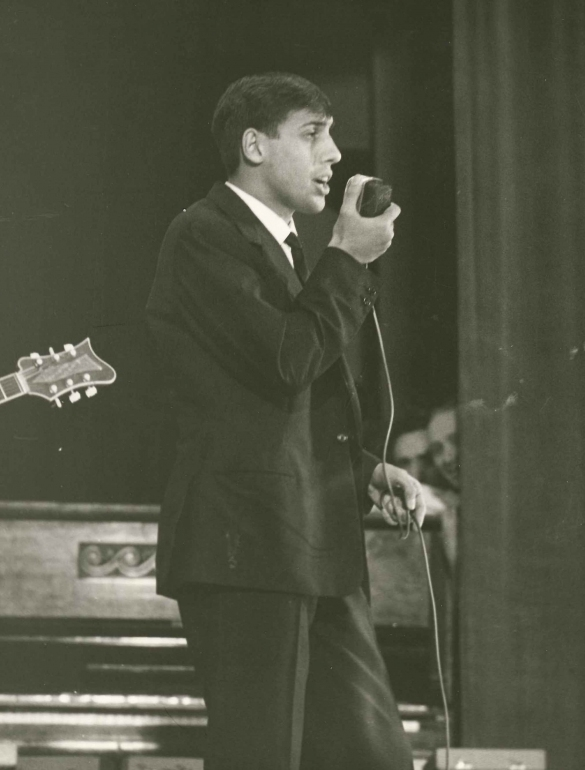
Mina and Adriano Celentano are tied for status of the best-selling Italian musical artist per most estimations.

This is the chart of Italian music artists listed by estimated sales according to the most important Italian newspapers, national television channels and music magazines. As the compilation of official data of sale of records in Italy it began to have departed only since 1995, thanks to the Federazione Industria Musicale Italiana, some corporate body of musical survey, as for instance Hit Parade Italy have tried to put order to the preceding respects furnished by Musica e dischi, TV Sorrisi e Canzoni, Ciao 2001, and Doxa. From 1990 to 1995 any corporate body has furnished official data or estime of sale of the singers.

Reliable sources of estimated sales are most important Italian newspapers and magazines, like Il Corriere della Sera, La Repubblica, Il Giornale, Il Messaggero, and national radio and TV channels, like Rai, Mediaset, MTV, and Radio Italia TV.

To date, national sources attest 145 Italian music artists have surpassed five million records sold, twelve of which have sold between 50 and 100 million copies and seven of which have sold over 100 million records.

== Artist by estimated sales ==
=== 100 and more million estimated copies ===
Artist	Region of origin	Period active	Genre	Estimated sales
Mina	Lombardy	1958–present	Europop, rhythm and blues, jazz, soul, swing, Canzone napoletana, Latin music, opera lirica	150 million
Adriano Celentano	Lombardy	1957–present	Light pop, rock and roll, musica d'autore	150 million
Dalida	Egypt	1955–1987	light pop, musica d'autore	140 million 120 million
Patty Pravo	Veneto	1966–present	Pop, beat, chanson	110 million
Pooh	Emilia-Romagna	1966–present	Pop, light pop, Pop rock, Beat	100 million
Luciano Pavarotti	Emilia-Romagna	1960–2006	Opera, light pop, Pop	100 million
Giorgio Moroder	South Tyrol	1958–1993, 2012–present	Italo disco, Euro disco, Light pop, Disco, Synth-pop, Electronic, Rock, New wave	100 million
Toto Cutugno	Tuscany – Liguria	1966–2023	Light pop, pop, musica d'autore	100 million

=== 50 million to 99 million estimated copies ===
Artist	Region of origin	Period active	Genre	Estimated sales
Andrea Bocelli	Tuscany	1994–present	Folk, operatic pop, light pop, opera lirica	90 million
Milva	Emilia-Romagna	1958–2012	Light pop, Folk, Tango, Chanson, Gospel	80 million
Umberto Tozzi	Piedmont	1968–present	Pop, pop rock	75 million
Ennio Morricone	Lazio	1946–2020	Soundtracks	70 million
Laura Pausini	Emilia-Romagna	1993–present	Pop, Europop, pop latino	70 million
Raffaella Carrà	Emilia-Romagna	1964–2021	Pop, pop latino, Disco, Europop, R&B	60 million
Claudio Baglioni	Lazio	1964–present	Light pop, world music	60 million
Domenico Modugno	Apulia	1953–1993	Canzone napoletana, Musica leggera, Musica d'autore	60 million
Eros Ramazzotti	Lazio	1981–present	Pop, pop latino, pop rock	60 million
Zucchero	Emilia-Romagna	1970–present	Blues, pop rock, electric blues, R&B, pop, adult contemporary	60 million
Edoardo Vianello	Lazio	1957–present	Pop, twist	50 million
Lucio Dalla	Emilia-Romagna	1962–2012	Pop, Jazz, blues, opera	50 million
Gianni Morandi	Emilia-Romagna	1962–present	Light pop	50 million
Rita Pavone	Piedmont	1962–present	Pop	50 million

=== 20 million to 49 million estimated sales ===
Artist	Region of origin	Period active	Genre	Estimated sales
Claudio Villa	Lazio	1944–1986	Light pop, folk	45 million
Renato Zero	Lazio	1973–present	Light pop, Europop, pop, pop rock, dance	45 million
Måneskin	Lazio	2016-2024	Rock, Pop rock, Alternative rock, Glam rock, Hard rock, Funk rock	40 million
Peppino Di Capri	Campania	1958–present	Light pop, twist, Canzone napoletana	35 million
Little Tony	Lazio – San Marino	1957–2013	Rock and roll, musica leggera	33 million
Orietta Berti	Emilia-Romagna	1962–present	Pop	30 million
Vasco Rossi	Emilia-Romagna	1977–present	Pop, pop rock	30 million
Mino Reitano	Calabria	1960–2007	Light pop, folk	30 million
Antonello Venditti	Lazio	1969–present	Musica d'autore	30 million
Lucio Battisti	Lazio	1964–1998	Light pop, pop rock, rhythm and blues	25 million
Al Bano	Apulia	1965–present	Light pop, Operatic pop	25 million
Giorgia	Lazio	1992–present	Pop, Europop, adult contemporary music, rhythm and blues, jazz, soul, smooth jazz	25 million
Nino D'Angelo	Campania	1976–present	Pop, Canzone napoletana, Musica d'autore, Musica etnica	25 million
Rondò Veneziano	Liguria, Veneto	1980–present	Musica new age	25 million
Lara Fabian	Sicily – Belgium	1991–present	Pop	23 million
Ricchi e Poveri	Liguria	1968–present	Pop	20 million
Sabrina Salerno	Liguria	1986–present	Italo disco, dance, pop, house music	20 million
Den Harrow	Lombardy	1983–present	Pop, Eurodance	20 million
Donatella Rettore	Veneto	1974–present	Pop rock, ska, musica d'autore	20 million
Pupo	Tuscany	1975–present	Pop rock	20 million
Franco Califano	Lazio	1960–2013	Pop, Musica leggera	20 million
Gigi D'Alessio	Campania	1992–present	Musica neomelodica, Canzone napoletana	20 million
Tiziano Ferro	Lazio	1999–present	Pop, soul, blues, neo rap, pop rap, bossa nova, swing, pop rock	20 million

=== 5 million to 19 million estimated sales ===
Artist	Region of origin	Period active	Genre	Estimated sales
Caterina Valente	Paris – Italy	1936–2001	Jazz, scat	18 million
Nomadi	Emilia-Romagna	1963–present	Beat, pop, folk	15 million
Eiffel 65	Piedmont	1998–2006 and 2010–present	Dance-pop, Eurodance, Europop, Italo dance	15 million
Massimo Ranieri	Campania	1964–present	Musica leggera, Canzone napoletana, pop	14 million
Gianna Nannini	Tuscany	1974–present	Pop rock	11 million
Spagna	Veneto	1971–present	Pop, Italo disco, disco	10 million
Loredana Bertè	Calabria	1969–present	Pop, pop rock, rock, musica leggera, Italo disco	10 million
George Aaron	Veneto	1984–present	Italo disco, Disco	10 million
Piero Pelù and the Litfiba	Tuscany	1986–present	Pop, Europop, pop latino, pop rock	10 million
Nek	Emilia-Romagna	1986–present	Pop, Europop, pop latino, pop rock	8 million
Max Pezzali and the 883	Lombardy	1989–present	Pop, pop rock, rap, comedy rap	7 million (singles not included)
Jovanotti	Lazio-Tuscany	1987–present	Rap italiano, world music, pop	7 million (singles not included)
Marco Masini	Tuscany	1988–present	Musica leggera	7 million
Alexia	Liguria	1992–present	Pop, Eurodance, pop, pop rock, soul, blues	6 million
Fiordaliso	Emilia-Romagna	1981–present	Pop, Europop, Adult contemporary pop rock music, Soul Blues	6 million
Cristina D'Avena	Emilia-Romagna	1981–present	Sigla TV, pop, dance	6 million
Roberto Vecchioni	Lombardy	1966–present	Pop, musica d'autore	6 million
Gala	Lombardy	1995–present	Dance, Italo dance, Pop, R&B	6 million
Elisa	Friuli-Venezia Giulia	1996–present	Pop, Alternative rock, pop rock	5.5 million
Gigliola Cinquetti	Veneto	1963–present	Musica leggera, Pop	5.4 million
Mango	Basilicata	1976–2014	Pop, world music, musica d'autore	5 million
Tony Esposito	Campania	1972–present	Funk, jazz, world music, musica etnica	5 million

=== Other artists with indefinite over 5 million estimated records sold ===
A

- Salvatore Adamo
- Biagio Antonacci
- Renzo Arbore

B

- Aleandro Baldi
- Luca Barbarossa
- Alex Baroni
- Franco Battiato
- Marcella Bella
- Edoardo Bennato
- Pierangelo Bertoli
- Fred Bongusto
- Angelo Branduardi
- Alex Britti
- Fred Buscaglione

C

- Luca Carboni
- Renato Carosone
- Enrico Caruso
- Caterina Caselli
- Riccardo Cocciante

D

- Tony Dallara
- Pino Daniele
- Fabrizio De André
- Francesco De Gregori
- Riccardo Del Turco
- Nicola Di Bari
- Dik Dik
- Pino Donaggio
- Johnny Dorelli

E

- Sergio Endrigo
- Equipe 84

F

- Nino Ferrer
- Nico Fidenco
- Piero Focaccia
- Jimmy Fontana
- Ivano Fossati

G

- Giorgio Gaber
- Rino Gaetano
- Peppino Gagliardi
- Gemelli Diversi
- Giuliano e i Notturni
- Loretta Goggi
- Wilma Goich
- Irene Grandi
- Ivan Graziani
- Gianluca Grignani
- Francesco Guccini

I

- I Cugini di Campagna
- Il Giardino dei Semplici

J

- J-Ax / Articolo 31
- Enzo Jannacci

L

- Gino Latilla
- Bruno Lauzi
- Fausto Leali
- Luciano Ligabue

M

- Mal
- Fiorella Mannoia
- Mia Martini
- Matia Bazar
- Mario Merola
- Michele
- Mietta
- Amedeo Minghi

N

- Nada
- New Trolls

O

- Anna Oxa

P

- Paola & Chiara
- Gino Paoli
- Gianni Pettenati
- Nilla Pizzi

R

- Raf
- Tony Renis
- Teddy Reno
- Renato Rascel
- Enrico Ruggeri

S

- Bobby Solo
- Alan Sorrenti
- Stadio

T

- The Rokes
- Luigi Tenco
- Mario Tessuto

V

- Ornella Vanoni

Z

- Iva Zanicchi
- Michele Zarrillo

=== Other commercially and media successful artists ===
Artist	Record label (as of 2023)	Albums (+ EP + Demo)	Singles	Sales certified (as of 2023)	Festival di Sanremo Nominations (as of 2025 edition)
Achille Lauro	Sony Music/No Face Agency	5 (+ 1 EP)	26	1,950,000+	2 Art.
Alessandra Amoroso	Sony Music/Columbia Records	6 (+ 1 EP)	37	2,905,000+	1 Art.
Angelina Mango	LaTarma Records/Warner Music Italy	1 (+ 2 EP)	13	1,450,000+	1 Art.
Anna Tatangelo	Sony Music/Believe Music Italia	8	43	1,000,000+	8 Art.
Annalisa	Warner Music Italy	6	30	4,800,000+	4 Art.
Ariete	Bomba Dischi/Universal	1(+ 3 EP)	18	950,000+	1 Art.
Arisa	Warner Music Italy	6 (+ 1 EP)	26	650,000+	3 Art.
Baby K	Sony Music	3 (+ 3 EP)	17	1,575,000+	-
Benji & Fede	Warner Music Italy	2	11	1,195,000+	-
Blanco	Universal	1	8	4,775,000+	1 Art.
Boomdabash	Macro Beats	5	15	2,045,000+	1 Art.
Calcutta	Bomba Dischi	4	13	1,205,000+	-
Carl Brave	Universal	3 (+ 1 EP)	13	2,705,000+	-
Carmen Consoli	Universal	8	35	2,050,000+	1 Art.
Cesare Cremonini	Warner Music Italy	6 + 1 with Lùnapop (+ 1 EP)	34 + 6 with Lùnapop	3,820,000+	-
Coez	Carosello Records	5 (+ 2 EP)	24	3,450,000+	-
Diodato	Carosello Records	4	18	330,000+	1 Art.
Dolcenera	Sony Music	6 (+ 2 EP)	25	400,000+	3 Art.
Elettra Lamborghini	Universal/Island Records	1 (+ 1 EP)	12	1,205,000+	1 Art.
Elodie	Universal/Island Records	4	13	2,405,000+	3 Art.
Emis Killa	Carosello Records	4 (+ 1 EP)	29	1,815,000+	-
Emma	Universal	6 (+ 1 EP)	36	1,675,000+	3 Art.
Ermal Meta	Mescal	4	17	410,000+	3 Art.
Ernia	Universal	3 (+ 1 EP)	14	2,325,000+	-
Fabri Fibra	Universal	9 (+ 2 EP)	40	3,155,000+	-
Fabrizio Moro	Sony Music	9	27	445,000+	7 Art.
Fedez	Sony Music	7 (+ 2 EP)	43	5,440,000+	1 Art.
Francesca Michielin	Sony Music	4 (+ 2 EP)	21	1,290,000+	2 Art.
Francesco Gabbani	BMG Rights Management	5	17	725,000+	2 Art.
Fred De Palma	Warner Music Italy	6	18	1,775,000+	-
Gazzelle	Maciste Dischi	2(+ 1 EP)	16	1,945,000+	-
Gemitaiz	Tanta Roba Records	5(+ 1 EP)	26	3,195,000+	-
Ghali	Tanta Roba Records	2(+ 1 EP)	16	2,855,000+	-
Giusy Ferreri	Sony Music	5(+ 1 EP)	29	2,600,000+	3 Art.
Gué Pequeno	Universal/Def Jam Recordings	6 + 7 with Club Dogo (+ 1 EP)	45 + 22 with Club Dogo	5,870,000+	-
Irama	Warner Music Italy	3 (+ 1 EP)	14	4,150,000+	4 Art.
Lazza	333 Mob/Universal Music Group	2(+ 3 EP)	50	5,585,000+	1 Art.
Levante	INRI/Warner Music Italy	4	22	505,000+	2 Art.
Lorenzo Fragola	Sony Music/Newtopia	3 (+ 1 EP)	14	710,000+	1 Art.
Luchè	Universal Music Group	4	40	1,980,000+	-
Madame	Sugar Music	1	17	2,600,000+	1 Art.
Madman	Maciste Dischi	5(+ 2 EP)	16	1,555,000+	-
Mahmood	Universal Music Group	2	17	2,070,000+	2 Art.
Malika Ayane	Sugar Music	5	21	725,000+	5 Art.
Måneskin	Sony Music	4 (+ 2 EP)	13	3,145,000+	1 Art.
Marco Mengoni	Sony Music	10 (+ 6 EP)	30	4,395,000+	2 Art.
Marracash	Roccia Music	8	44	6,490,000+	-
Max Gazzè	EMI Records/Universal	10	25	630,000+	5 Art.
Modà	Believe Music	6 (+ 1 EP)	33	1,785,000+	3 Art.
Mr. Rain	Warner Music Italy	2	15	900,000+	1 Art.
Neffa	Sony Music	8 (+ 1 EP)	32	535,000+	2 Art.
Negramaro	Sugar Music	7	35	3,130,000+	1 Art.
Negrita	Universal	10 (+ 2 EP)	35	750,000+	2 Art.
Nina Zilli	Universal	4 (+ 1 EP)	12	250,000+	4 Art.
Nitro	Machete Empire Records/Sony Music	3	12	970,000+	-
Noemi	Sony Music	5 (+ 1 EP)	22	1,140,000+	7 Art.
Pinguini Tattici Nucleari	Sony Music	4 (+ 2 EP)	12	3,725,000+	1 Art.
Psicologi	Bomba Dischi/Universal	3 (+ 2 EP)	20	825,000+	-
Francesco Renga	Sony Music	8	35	660,000+	7 Art.
Rkomi	Universal	3 (+ 2 EP)	20	4,170,000+	1 Art.
Rocco Hunt	Sony Music/Honiro Label	4(+ 2 EP)	25	1,950,000+	1Art.
Salmo	Sony Music/Machete Empire Records	6	20	5,015,000+	-
Sangiovanni	Sugar/Fascino	1(+ 1 EP)	12	2,010,000+	1 Art.
Shade	Warner Music Italy	3	16	845,000+	-
Sick Luke	Carosello/Universal	2 (+ 5 EP)	4	860,000+	-
Anna Tatangelo	Sony Music	7	35	710,000+	1 Art.
Takagi & Ketra	Sony Music	-	6	1,740,000+	-
Tedua	Universal	2 (+ 1 EP)	15	2,840,000+	-
Tha Supreme	Epic Records	1	15	3,670,000+	-
Thegiornalisti	Carosello Records	5 (+ 1 EP)	16	1,375,000+	1 Art.
Tiromancino	Virgin Records/Sony Music Italy	11	42	785,000+	2 Art.
Tommaso Paradiso	Universal	5 with Thegiornalisti	9 + 16 with Thegiornalisti	2,260,000+	1 Art.
Ultimo	Honiro Label	5	17	3,830,000+	2 Art.

=== Successful artists from Italian talent shows ===
Artist	Talent show	Record label (as of 2020)	Albums (+ EP + Demo)	Singles	Sales certified _{(as of October, 10 2025)}	Festival di Sanremo Nominations (as of 2025 edition)
Marco Mengoni	X Factor	Sony Music	12 (+ 6 EP)	45	5,395,000+	3 Art.
Annalisa	Amici di Maria De Filippi	Warner Music Italy	9	45	4,850,000+	7 Art.
Irama	Amici di Maria De Filippi	Warner Music Italy	5 (+ 2 EP)	28	4,250,000+	5 Art. (+1 NP)
Måneskin	X Factor	Sony Music	4 (+ 1 EP)	19	3,965,000+	1 Art.
Elodie	Amici di Maria De Filippi	Universal/Island Records	5 (+ 1 EP + 1 Mixtape)	38	3,850,000+	4 Art.
Alessandra Amoroso	Amici di Maria De Filippi	Sony Music/Columbia Records	10 (+ 1 EP)	49	3,430,000+	1 Art.
Mahmood	X Factor	Universal	3 (+ 1 EP)	25	3,185,000+	3 Art. (+1 NP)
Emma	Amici di Maria De Filippi	Universal	9 (+ 1 EP)	51	2,800,000+	4 Art.
Sangiovanni	Amici di Maria De Filippi	Sugar/Fascino	1 (+ 1 EP)	21	2,710,000+	2 Art.
Giusy Ferreri	X Factor	Sony Music	7 (+ 1 EP)	38	2,600,000+	4 Art.
Mara Sattei	Amici di Maria De Filippi	Arista Records/Sony Music	2 (+ 1 EP + 1 Mixtape)	25	1,760,000+	1 Art.
The Kolors	Amici di Maria De Filippi	Universal/Tempi Duri Records	4	25	1,495,000+	2 Art.
Angelina Mango	Amici di Maria De Filippi	LaTarma Records/Warner Music Italy	1 (+ 2 EP)	13	1,450,000+	1 Art.
Francesca Michielin	X Factor	Sony Music	5 (+ 3 EP)	41	1,315,000+	3 Art.
Noemi	X Factor	Sony Music	8 (+ 1 EP)	34	1,290,000+	8 Art.
Gaia	Amici di Maria De Filippi	Sony Music	3 (+ 1 EP)	20	1,150,000+	2 Art.
Lorenzo Fragola	X Factor	Sony Music/Newtopia	4 (+ 1 EP)	21	710,000+	1 Art.
Il Volo	Io canto	Epic Records/Sony Music	15 (+ 2 EP)	21	610,000+	3 Art.
Aka 7even	Amici di Maria De Filippi	Sony Music/Fascino	1 (+ 2 EP)	27	550,000+	1 Art.
Michele Bravi	X Factor	Universal	4 (+ 2 EP)	27	450,000+	2 Art.

== See also ==
- List of best-selling music artists
- List of best-selling albums in Italy
- List of best-selling singles in Italy
- List of best-selling singles
- List of best-selling music artists in the United States
- List of best-selling music artists in Finland
- List of best-selling Swedish music artists
- Italian music awards

== Notes ==
This list is not compiled by certified sales but by estimated sales.
Sales sources are the most reliable Italian newspapers, music magazines and national TV channels.
