= Ricordi =

Ricordi may refer to:

== People ==
- Camillo Ricordi (born 1957), American-Italian physician-scientist
- Giovanni Ricordi (1785–1853), Italian violinist and publishing company founder
- Giulio Ricordi (1840–1912), Italian publisher and musician

== Music ==
- Casa Ricordi, an Italian music publishing company established in 1808
  - Dischi Ricordi, a subsidiary established in 1958
- Ricordi, a 1985 album by Carla Boni
- "Ricordi" (Finley song), 2008
- "Ricordi" (Pinguini Tattici Nucleari song), 2022
- "Ricordi (Blanco and Elisa song)", 2026

== Other uses ==
- Cyclura ricordi, a species of rock iguana
- Ricordi, plural of ricordo, modello-like copy of a work of art

== See also ==
- House of Ricordi, a 1954 French-Italian film based on the history of Casa Ricordi
