= Stasera mi butto (film) =

1967 film

- Directed by: Ettore Maria Fizzarotti
- Screenplay by: Giovanni Grimaldi
- Produced by: Gilberto Carbone
- Starring: Marisa Sannia; Giancarlo Giannini
- Cinematography: Guglielmo Mancori
- Edited by: Daniele Alabiso
- Music by: Gian Franco Reverberi
- Distributed by: Titanus
- Release date: 1967
- Country: Italy
- Language: Italian

Stasera mi butto (literally 'Tonight I'm jumping in') is a 1967 Italian musicarello film directed by Ettore Maria Fizzarotti. It is based on the hit song with the same title by Rocky Roberts.

== Cast ==
- Marisa Sannia as Marisa
- Giancarlo Giannini as Professor Carlo Timidoni
- Nino Taranto as Marisa's father
- Lola Falana as Lola
- Rocky Roberts as Rocky
- Franco Franchi as Franco
- Ciccio Ingrassia as Ciccio
- Caterina Boratto as Countess Eugenia
- Stelvio Rosi as Fabrizio
- Giuseppe Porelli as Fefè
- Enrico Viarisio as Fefè's father
- Renata Pacini as Renata
- Enrico Montesano as Enrico
- Enzo Cannavale as the waiter
- Dada Gallotti as Tilde

== Production ==
The film is based on the hit song "Stasera mi butto" by Rocky Roberts, who also appear in the film. Principal photography started in Castel Volturno on 21 August 1967. The film was shot in just 13 days.

== Release ==
The film was released domestically by Titanus on 3 November 1967. It was released in Spain as Esta noche me lanzo on 14 October 1968. In 1975, following the success achieved by Giancarlo Giannini, it was re-released as Il Professor Timidoni (Professor Timidoni being Giannini's character in the film).
