= Ferma a guardare =

Single by Ernia featuring Pinguini Tattici Nucleari

from the album Gemelli
- Released: 20 January 2021
- Length: 3:33
- Label: Island
- Songwriters: Matteo Professione; Riccardo Zanotti; Rosario Castagnola; Sarah Tartuffo; Enrico Brun
- Producers: D-Ross; Star-T-Uffo

Ernia singles chronology
"25 ore" (2020)	"Ferma a guardare" (2021)	"Di notte" (2021)

Pinguini Tattici Nucleari singles chronology
"Scooby Doo" (2020)	"Ferma a guardare" (2021)	"Scrivile scemo" (2021)

Music video
- "Ferma a guardare" on YouTube

"Ferma a guardare" is a song co-written and recorded by Italian rapper Ernia featuring Italian pop rock band Pinguini Tattici Nucleari. It was released on 20 January 2021 through Island Records and included in the digital re-issue of the rapper's third studio album Gemelli.

== Description ==
The song was originally published as the sixth track of Ernia's third studio album Gemelli in June 2020. Despite not being released as a single, the track peaked at number 18 on the Italian singles chart. The second version featuring Pinguini Tattici Nucleari served as the lead single of the re-issue of the album in January 2021. The new version had new lyrics written by the band frontman Riccardo Zanotti, who described the collaboration: "Ernia has had her own winding road, like us, and there are many similarities between our paths, however much we do different genres. We came up with the idea of trying to do something together, to mix our respective musical visions."

== Music video ==
A music video for "Ferma a guardare", directed by Fabrizio Conte, was released onto YouTube on 28 January 2021.

== Charts ==
Weekly chart performance for "Ferma a guardare"
Chart (2020)	Peak position
Italy (FIMI)	18

Weekly chart performance for "Ferma a guardare (feat. Pinguini Tattici Nucleari)"
Chart (2021)	Peak position
Italy (FIMI)	3
Italy Airplay (EarOne)	17
San Marino (SMRRTV Top 50)	39

=== Year-end charts ===
2021 year-end chart performance for "Ferma a guardare"
Chart	Position
Italy (FIMI)	23

== Certifications ==
Region	Certification	Certified units/sales
Italy (FIMI)	5× Platinum	500,000^{‡}
^{‡} Sales+streaming figures based on certification alone.
