= Guasto d'amore =

Single by Bresh and Shune

from the album Mediterraneo
- Released: 27 January 2023
- Length: 3:20
- Label: Epic; Sony
- Songwriters: Andrea Emanuele Brasi; Luca Ghiazzi; Luca Di Biasi; Luca Carosio
- Producer: Shune

Bresh singles chronology
"Vuoto dentro" (2022)	"Guasto d'amore" (2023)	"Altamente mia" (2023)

Music video
- "Guasto d'amore" on YouTube

"Guasto d'amore" (eng. "love breakdown") is a song written and recorded by Italian singer Bresh and Italian record producer Shune. It was released by Epic and Sony on 27 January 2023 as the lead single from the artist's third studio album Mediterraneo.

It was written by Bresh, Shune, Luca Di Biasi and Luca Carosio, as a love song to the soccer team Genoa CFC. It topped the Italian singles chart and was certified quintuple platinum in Italy.

== Music video ==
The music video for "Guasto d'amore", directed by Simone Mariano, was released on 21 February 2023 via Bresh's YouTube channel.

== Charts ==
=== Weekly charts ===
Weekly chart performance for "Guasto d'amore"
Chart (2023)	Peak position
Italy (FIMI)	1

=== Year-end charts ===
2023 year-end chart performance for "Guasto d'amore"
Chart (2023)	Position
Italy (FIMI)	14

2024 year-end chart performance for "Guasto d'amore"
Chart (2024)	Position
Italy (FIMI)	97

== Certifications ==
Region	Certification	Certified units/sales
Italy (FIMI)	5× Platinum	500,000^{‡}
^{‡} Sales+streaming figures based on certification alone.
