= Stasera mi butto =

Single by Rocky Roberts

from the album Sabato sera
- B-side: "Just Because of You"
- Released: 1967
- Genre: Rhythm and blues
- Length: 2:04
- Label: Durium
- Songwriter(s): Antonio Amurri, Bruno Canfora

Rocky Roberts singles chronology
"Don't Play That Song" (1967)	"Stasera mi butto" (1967)	"Un giorno con te" (1967)

Audio
- "Stasera mi butto" on YouTube

"Stasera mi butto" (transl. 'Tonight I'm jumping in') is a 1967 Italian song composed by Bruno Canfora (music) and Antonio Amurri (lyrics) and performed by Rocky Roberts. It is included in his album Sabato sera.

== Overview ==
The song was first popularised by Gianni Boncompagni, who put it on heavy rotation in his radio show Bandiera gialla, and then it definitely achieved mainstream success after it became the opening song of the RAI Saturday night show Studio Uno. It won the fourth edition of Festivalbar and topped the singles chart, marking Roberts' breakthrough and becoming his signature song.

The song was adapted into a musicarello film with the same title, directed by Ettore Maria Fizzarotti and starring Marisa Sannia, Giancarlo Giannini and the same Roberts.

Artists who covered the song include Claude François, Enrico Intra, Lita Torelló, Gianni Nazzaro, and Bingo Reyna.

== Track listing ==
No.	Title	Writer(s)	Length
1.	"Stasera mi butto"	Amurri, Canfora	2:04
2.	"Just Because of You"	Doug Fowlkes, Jesse James King, Wess Johnson	2:02

== Charts ==
Chart (1967)	Peak position
Italy (Musica e dischi)	1
