= Camillo Ricordi =

Diabetes researcher

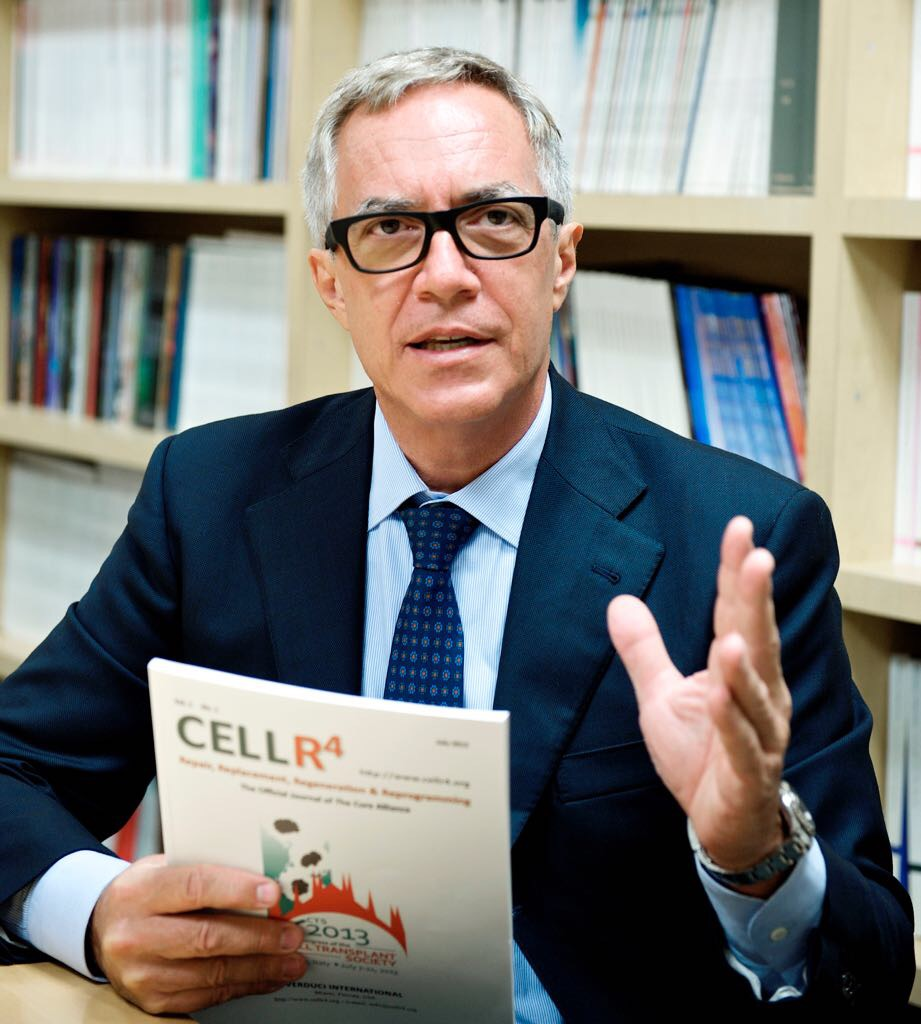
- Ricordi in December 2017
- Born: April 1, 1957 (age 69); New York City

Academic background
- Education: University of Milan

Camillo Ricordi (born April 1, 1957) is an American-Italian physician-scientist working in cellular transplantation, diabetes research, stem cell and regenerative/healthspan medicine. He is a Professor of Surgery, Distinguished Professor of Medicine, and Professor of Biomedical Engineering, Microbiology, and Immunology at University of Miami, where he serves as Director of the Cell Transplant Center and Director Emeritus of the Diabetes Research Institute. He was named as fellow of National Academy of Inventors in 2017.

== Early life and education ==
Ricordi was born in New York City and raised in Italy. He completed his medical education at the University of Milan. After obtaining his medical degree and completing military service in the Italian Air Force, he relocated to the United States for postdoctoral research.

From 1986 to 1988, Ricordi worked at Washington University in St. Louis under Paul E. Lacy, a pioneer in islet cell transplantation. He later joined the University of Pittsburgh, where he led cellular transplantation efforts at the Thomas E. Starzl Transplant Institute.

== Career and research ==
After graduating in medicine, he specialized in gastrointestinal surgery and digestive endoscopy at the University of Milan, graduating cum laude in 1988. During this same period he completed several complementary studies at the Washington University School of Medicine (St Louis, Missouri), in the Department of Genetics, and conducting training in immunogenetics and immunobiology of cell transplants.

After a period of military service in the Italian Air Force, where he worked as a medical officer with the rank of lieutenant, he joined as assistant professor of surgery in the Department of Surgery of the Division of Transplantation in the School of Medicine of the University of Pittsburgh, Pennsylvania.

His professional career has been developed in the educational and scientific field mainly. He has been co-director of the Executive Office of Research Leadership (2001–2003), as Senior Associate Dean of Research (2003–2006) and has chaired the Dean's Research Office (2006–2012) at the Miller School of Medicine at the University of Miami.

Ricordi is Professor of Surgery at Stacy Joy Goodman, Distinguished Professor of Medicine, Professor of Biomedical Engineering and Microbiology and Immunology at the University of Miami, Florida, where he also appears as Director of the Diabetes Research Institute (DRI) and the Cell Transplant Center.

He is also a Head of the Human Cell Processing Facility, funded by NIH, which has been providing human cell products for research and clinical applications at the University of Miami, Florida, and throughout the world since 1993.

He was part of a team in 1986 at the Washington University in St. Louis that pioneered what is known as the islet transplant procedure, developed to address the worst cases of diabetes type 1. He is credited with developing the automated method for islet cell isolation called the "Ricordi Method." The method includes the use of the Ricordi Chamber, for which Ricordi was awarded, for Surgery, the Nessim-Habif World Prize, University of Geneva in 2001. The award is given to the invention of a machine that allows progress to be made significant in a field of surgery. Ricordi's invention of the automated islet isolation method made it possible to obtain a greater number of islets of a human pancreas; before they needed up to five or six organs to carry out a transplant.

Ricordi has been published in academic and medical journals, has over 1,778 scientific publications, >51,104 citations and an h-index of 113. He has been awarded 28 patents as an inventor. He has participated in congresses and meetings on isolation and transplantation of islets for the treatment of diabetes.

In 2021, Ricordi was named editor-in-chief of the European Review for Medical and Pharmacological Sciences.

Ricordi has supported the development of international research consortia and technological platforms aimed at facilitating global scientific collaboration. He was a founding president of The Cure Alliance and chaired the Diabetes Research Institute Federation, a network of institutions focused on cure-based diabetes research.

He has also been serving as President of the Board of ISMETT (Istituto Mediterraneo per i Trapianti e Terapie ad Alta Specializzazione) since 2004, a transplant and research center in Palermo, Italy, and served as President of Fondazione Ri.MED, a biotechnology initiative supported by the Italian government and the University of Pittsburgh Medica Center (UPMC).

=== Islet Cell Transplantation ===
Ricordi is recognized for developing a method to isolate large numbers of pancreatic islets the insulin-producing cells of the pancreas from donor organs. This advancement made it possible to perform the first successful clinical islet allotransplants, a procedure in which islets are infused into a patient's liver to restore insulin production in individuals with Type 1 diabetes.

His isolation method became the foundation for clinical protocols worldwide and contributed to multicenter clinical trials supported by the National Institutes of Health (NIH) and the U.S. Food and Drug Administration (FDA).

=== Regenerative Medicine and COVID-19 Research ===
In addition to diabetes research, Ricordi has explored regenerative medicine application co-founding Lipogems International, Inc. in 2010. His contributions to Mesenchymal Stromal Cell clinical trials in kidney transplantation and Type 1 Diabetes are now expanding to additional immune and inflammatory disease conditions. During the COVID-19 pandemic, he led an international team in a double-blind, placebo-controlled clinical trial investigating the use of mesenchymal stromal cells to treat acute respiratory distress syndrome (ARDS) in severe COVID-19 patients. The trial reported improved survival rates compared to control groups and contributed to further interest in cellular immunomodulatory therapies. In 2022 he co-founded AION Healthspan, Inc. whose IND was authorized by FDA to proceed to a clinical trials in diabetes nephropathy and other forms of chronic kidney disease. Recent encouraging results have been obtained also in GVHD (Graft Versus Host Disease).

=== Healthspan and Aging Research ===
Ricordi has also focused on healthspan to improve the period of life spent in physical and mental health by investigating nutritional, pharmacological, and lifestyle interventions aimed at preventing the accelerated ageing associated with chronic disease conditions. He founded the initiative Fit4Healthspan, which promotes public health strategies designed to reduce vulnerability to chronic and infectious diseases. In this direction, he published two books: The Healthspan Code and Therapeutic Revolution.

== Awards and recognition ==
Ricordi has received multiple national and international awards for his scientific contributions. These include the World Prize in Surgery (2001), the Outstanding Scientific Achievement Award from the American Diabetes Association (2002), and induction into the Association of American Physicians (2010) and the National Academy of Inventors (2018).

In 2009, he was Knighted (Cavaliere Ufficiale) by the President and the Prime Minister of the Italian Republic.

In 2023, he received the Leonardo da Vinci Award alongside Nobel Laureates Shinya Yamanaka and Gregg Semenza, and in 2025, he was awarded the PAIR Prize for American-Italian Relations .

=== Collaborations and Trials ===
Ricordi has participated in several multicenter and first-in-human clinical trials involving novel cellular therapies. These include trials using stem cell-derived islets (Vertex VX-880) and experimental approaches towards induction of immune tolerance, to minimize or eliminate the need for chronic recipient immunosuppression. He has also contributed to the development of bioengineered pancreatic implants and tolerance-inducing microgels, in collaboration with both academic and industry partners.

== Selected publications ==
- Shapiro AJ, Ricordi C, Hering BJ, Auchincloss H, Lindblad R, Robertson RP, et al. (September 28, 2006). "International Trial of the Edmonton Protocol for Islet Transplantation". New England Journal of Medicine. 355 (13): 1318–1330. doi:10.1056/nejmoa061267. ISSN 0028-4793. PMID 17005949.
- Starzl T, Murase N, Ildstad S, Ricordi C, Demetris A, Trucco M (1992). "Cell migration, chimerism, and graft acceptance". The Lancet. 339 (8809): 1579–1582. doi:10.1016/0140-6736(92)91840-5. ISSN 0140-6736. PMC 2950640. PMID 1351558.
- Cabrera O, Berman DM, Kenyon NS, Ricordi C, Berggren PO, Caicedo A (February 6, 2006). "The unique cytoarchitecture of human pancreatic islets has implications for islet cell function". Proceedings of the National Academy of Sciences. 103 (7): 2334–2339. Bibcode:2006PNAS..103.2334C. doi:10.1073/pnas.0510790103. ISSN 0027-8424. PMC 1413730. PMID 16461897.
- Ricordi C, Lacy PE, Finke EH, Olack BJ, Scharp DW (April 1, 1988). "Automated method for isolation of human pancreatic islets". Diabetes. 37 (4): 413–420. doi:10.2337/diab.37.4.413. ISSN 0012-1797. PMID 3288530.
- Dr D'Ippolito G, Schiller PC, Ricordi C, Roos BA, Howard GA (July 1, 1999). "Age-Related Osteogenic Potential of Mesenchymal Stromal Stem Cells from Human Vertebral Bone Marrow". Journal of Bone and Mineral Research. 14 (7): 1115–1122. doi:10.1359/jbmr.1999.14.7.1115. ISSN 0884-0431. PMID 10404011.
- Pugliese A, Zeller M, Fernandez A, Zalcberg LJ, Bartlett RJ, Ricordi C, et al. (March 1997). "The insulin gene is transcribed in the human thymus and transcription levels correlate with allelic variation at the INS VNTR-IDDM2 susceptibility locus for type 1 diabetes". Nature Genetics. 15 (3): 293–297. doi:10.1038/ng0397-293. ISSN 1061-4036. PMID 9054945.
- Shapiro AM, Pokrywczynska M, Ricordi C (November 11, 2016). "Clinical pancreatic islet transplantation". Nature Reviews Endocrinology. 13 (5): 268–277. doi:10.1038/nrendo.2016.178. ISSN 1759-5029. PMID 27834384.
- Hering BJ, Clarke WR, Bridges ND, Eggerman TL, Alejandro R, Bellin MD, et al. (April 18, 2016). "Phase 3 Trial of Transplantation of Human Islets in Type 1 Diabetes Complicated by Severe Hypoglycemia". Diabetes Care. 39 (7): 1230–1240. doi:10.2337/dc15-1988. ISSN 0149-5992. PMC 5317236. PMID 27208344.
- Ricordi C, Gray DW, Hering BJ, Kaufman DB, Warnock GL, Kneteman NM, et al. (July 1990). "Islet isolation assessment in man and large animals". Acta Diabetologica Latina. 27 (3): 185–195. doi:10.1007/bf02581331. ISSN 0001-5563. PMID 2075782.
- Tan J, Wu W, Xu X, Liao L, Zheng F, Messinger S, et al. (March 21, 2012). "Induction Therapy With Autologous Mesenchymal Stem Cells in Living-Related Kidney Transplants". JAMA. 307 (11): 1169–1177. doi:10.1001/jama.2012.316. ISSN 0098-7484. PMID 22436957.
- Fornoni A, Sageshima J, Wei C, Merscher-Gomez S, Aguillon-Prada R, Jauregui AN, et al. (June 2011). "Rituximab Targets Podocytes in Recurrent Focal Segmental Glomerulosclerosis". Science Translational Medicine. 3 (85): 85ra46. doi:10.1126/scitranslmed.3002231. ISSN 1946-6234. PMC 3719858. PMID 21632984.
- Gunton JE, Kulkarni RN, Yim S, Okada T, Hawthorne WJ, Tseng YH, et al. (August 2005). "Loss of ARNT/HIF1β Mediates Altered Gene Expression and Pancreatic-Islet Dysfunction in Human Type 2 Diabetes". Cell. 122 (3): 337–349. doi:10.1016/j.cell.2005.05.027. ISSN 0092-8674. PMID 16096055.
- Seufert J, Kieffer TJ, Leech CA, Holz GG, Moritz W, Ricordi C, et al. (February 1, 1999). "Leptin Suppression of Insulin Secretion and Gene Expression in Human Pancreatic Islets: Implications for the Development of Adipogenic Diabetes Mellitus1". The Journal of Clinical Endocrinology & Metabolism. 84 (2): 670–676. doi:10.1210/jcem.84.2.5460. ISSN 0021-972X. PMC 2927866. PMID 10022436.
