= Mediterraneo (Bresh album) =

Studio album by Bresh
- Released: 6 June 2025
- Genre: Pop rap
- Length: 48:03
- Label: Epic
- Producers: Danien; Dibla; Grow Tribe; Jiz; Juli; Roy Lenzo; Shune; Zef

Bresh chronology
Oro blu (2022)	Mediterraneo (2025)

Singles from Mediterraneo
- 1. "Guasto d'amore" Released: 27 January 2023; 2. "Altamente mia" Released: 7 April 2023; 3. "Torcida" Released: 10 May 2024; 4. "La tana del granchio" Released: 12 February 2025; 5. "Umore marea" Released: 9 May 2025; 6. "Dai che fai" Released: 12 September 2025; 7. "Introvabile" Released: 23 January 2026; 8. "Da Dio" Released: 15 May 2026

Mediterraneo (transl. Mediterranean) is the third studio album by Italian singer-songwriter Bresh, released on 6 June 2025 by Epic.

The album contains the single "La tana del granchio", with which the artist competed at the 75th Sanremo Music Festival, finishing in eleventh place.

== Background and composition ==
The album is the third and final chapter in the trilogy based on water, specifically the sea, which began in 2020 with the release of the first album, Che io mi aiuti, and continued in 2022 with the release of the second album, Oro blu.

The recording project, consisting of sixteen tracks (plus one for the digital reissue included later), was written by the singer himself with the collaboration of songwriters and producers, including Daniele Nelli, Luca Di Blasi, Dibla, Matteo Ciceroni, Giorgio De Lauri, Juli, Roy Lenzo, Luca Ghiazzi, Calcutta and Stefano Tognini. The album, announced on 21 May 2025, explores the artist's biographical themes, including life in the city of Genoa and his relationship with music. The tracklist and featured artists were revealed on 2 June, including five collaborations with Italian singers Achille Lauro and Tedua, Italian rappers Sayf and Kid Yugi and Italian record producer Shune.

== Track listing ==
Mediterraneo – Standard track listing
No.	Title	Lyrics	Music	Producer(s)	Length
1.	"Rotta maggiore (partenza)"	Andrea Emanuele Brasi	Luca Blasi; Luca Ghiazzi	Dibla; Shune	2:34
2.	"Umore marea"	Brasi	Ghiazzi; Rocco Biazzi	Shune	2:38
3.	"Capo Horn" (featuring Tedua)	Brasi; Mario Molinari	Andrea De Filippi; Giorgio De Lauri; Luca Di Blasi	Dibla; Jiz	2:38
4.	"Kamala"	Brasi	Di Blasi; Ghiazzi	Dibla; Shune	3:07
5.	"La tana del granchio"	Brasi	De Lauri; Di Blasi; Ghiazzi	Dibla; Jiz; Shune	3:28
6.	"Altezza cielo" (featuring Kid Yugi)	Brasi; Francesco Stasi	Ghiazzi; Michele Bargigia	Shune	2:41
7.	"Agave"	Brasi	Ghiazzi; Biazzi	Shune	3:17
8.	"Popolo della notte"	Brasi	Ghiazzi	Shune	2:46
9.	"Aia che tia"	Brasi	De Lauri; Di Blasi	Dibla; Jiz	3:17
10.	"Dai che fai"	Brasi; Edorardo D'Erme	Brasi; D'Erme; Rosario Lenzo	Roy Lenzo	3:20
11.	"Guasto d'amore" (with Shune)	Brasi	Luca Carosio; Di Blasi; Ghiazzi	Shune	3:20
12.	"Tarantola"	Brasi	Di Blasi; Ghiazzi	Dibla; Shune	3:07
13.	"Erica" (featuring Sayf)	Brasi; Adam Sayf Viacava	De Lauri; Di Blasi	Dibla; Jiz	2:53
14.	"Il limite" (featuring Achille Lauro)	Brasi; Lauro De Marinis	Daniele Nelli; De Lauri; Di Blasi; Ghiazzi; Matteo Ciceroni; Rino Gaetano	Danien; Dibla; Gow Tribe; Shune	3:11
15.	"Altamente mia"	Brasi	Di Blasi; Ghiazzi	Shune	2:52
16.	"Torcida"	Brasi	Alessandro De Crescenzo; Stefano Tognini	Zef	2:54

Mediterraneo – Streaming re-issue bonus track
No.	Title	Lyrics	Music	Producer(s)	Length
17.	"Introvabile"	Brasi	Biazzi; Ghiazzi; Julien Boverod	Biazzi; Juli; Shune	2:55
18.	"Da Dio"	Brasi	Brasi; Biazzi; Ghiazzi	Shune	2:53

== Charts ==
=== Weekly charts ===
Weekly chart performance for Mediterraneo
Chart (2025)	Peak position
Italian Albums (FIMI)	1
Swiss Albums (Schweizer Hitparade)	73

=== Year-end charts ===
Year-end chart performance for Mediterraneo
Chart	Year	Position
Italian Albums (FIMI)	2025	20

== Certifications ==
Certifications for Mediterraneo
Region	Certification	Certified units/sales
Italy (FIMI)	3× Platinum	150,000^{‡}
^{‡} Sales+streaming figures based on certification alone.
