= Pastello bianco =

Single by Pinguini Tattici Nucleari

from the album Ahia!
- Released: 17 September 2021
- Recorded: 2020
- Length: 3:58
- Label: RCA; Sony Music
- Songwriter: Riccardo Zanotti
- Producers: Fabrizio Ferraguzzo; Enrico Brun

Pinguini Tattici Nucleari singles chronology
| "Scrivile scemo" (2021) | "Pastello bianco" (2021) | "Giovani Wannabe" (2022) |

Music video
- "Pastello bianco" on YouTube

"Pastello bianco" (transl. White crayon) is a song by Italian band Pinguini Tattici Nucleari.

It was originally published as the fourth track of the EP Ahia! by Sony Music in December 2020, and then released as a radio single on 17 September 2021. A Christmas version of the song was released on 18 November 2022 by Amazon Music.

The song peaked at number 2 on the Italian singles chart and was certified eight-times platinum in Italy.

== Charts ==
=== Weekly charts ===
Weekly chart performance for "Pastello bianco"
| Chart (2021–2022) | Peak position |
|---|---|
| Italy (FIMI) | 2 |
| Italy Airplay (EarOne) | 17 |

=== Year-end charts ===
Year-end chart performance for "Pastello bianco"
| Chart | Year | Position |
|---|---|---|
| Italy (FIMI) | 2021 | 34 |
| Italy (FIMI) | 2022 | 12 |
| Italy (FIMI) | 2023 | 41 |
| Italy (FIMI) | 2025 | 89 |

== Certifications ==
| Region | Certification | Certified units/sales |
|---|---|---|
| Italy (FIMI) | 8× Platinum | 800,000^{‡} |
^{‡} Sales+streaming figures based on certification alone.
