= Scooby Doo (song) =

Single by Pinguini Tattici Nucleari

from the album Ahia!
- Released: 13 November 2020
- Recorded: 2020
- Length: 2:59
- Label: RCA; Sony Music
- Songwriters: Riccardo Zanotti; Giorgio Pesenti; Marco Ravello
- Producers: Fabrizio Ferraguzzo; Enrico Brun

Pinguini Tattici Nucleari singles chronology
"La storia infinita" (2020)	"Scooby Doo" (2020)	"Ferma a guardare" (2021)

Music video
- "Scooby Doo" on YouTube

"Scooby Doo" is a song by Italian pop rock band Pinguini Tattici Nucleari. It was released by Sony Music on 13 November 2020 as the second single from the band's EP Ahia!.

The song talks about the difficulties of interpersonal relationships, and about the masks we wear to accommodate conformism. The title is a reference to the American animated series of the same name. The chorus invites you to "take off your mask like in Scooby-Doo".

The song peaked at number 2 on the Italian singles chart and was certified quadruple platinum in Italy.

== Charts ==
=== Weekly charts ===
Weekly chart performance for "Scooby Doo"
Chart (2020–2021)	Peak position
Italy (FIMI)	2
Italy Airplay (EarOne)	4

=== Year-end charts ===
2021 year-end chart performance for "Scooby Doo"
Chart	Position
Italy (FIMI)	32

== Certifications ==
Region	Certification	Certified units/sales
Italy (FIMI)	4× Platinum	400,000^{‡}
^{‡} Sales+streaming figures based on certification alone.
