= Ahia! =

EP by Pinguini Tattici Nucleari
- Released: 4 December 2020
- Length: 24:27
- Label: Sony

Pinguini Tattici Nucleari chronology
| Fuori dall'hype (2019) | Ahia! (2020) | Fake News (2022) |

Singles from Ahia!
- 1. "La storia infinita" Released: 28 August 2020; 2. "Scooby Doo" Released: 13 November 2020; 3. "Scrivile scemo" Released: 23 April 2021; 4. "Pastello bianco" Released: 17 September 2021

Ahia! is an extended play by the Italian band Pinguini Tattici Nucleari. It was released on 4 December 2020 by Sony Music Italy.

The release of the EP was preceded by the singles "La storia infinita" and "Scooby Doo", as well as by the novel of the same name written by frontman Riccardo Zanotti published on 3 November 2020.

Ahia! debuted at number five on the Italian Albums Chart and peaked at number two four weeks later. The EP was certified six times platinum by the Federazione Industria Musicale Italiana.

== Track listing ==
Ahia! track listing
| No. | Title | Length |
|---|---|---|
| 1. | "Scooby Doo" | 2:59 |
| 2. | "Scrivile scemo" | 3:34 |
| 3. | "Bohémien" | 3:13 |
| 4. | "Pastello bianco" | 3:56 |
| 5. | "La storia infinita" | 3:27 |
| 6. | "Giulia" | 3:06 |
| 7. | "Ahia!" | 4:12 |
| Total length: | | 24:27 |

== Charts ==
=== Weekly charts ===
| Chart (2021) | Peak position |
|---|---|
| Italian Albums (FIMI) | 2 |

=== Year-end charts ===
| Chart | Year | Position |
|---|---|---|
| Italian Albums (FIMI) | 2020 | 74 |
| Italian Albums (FIMI) | 2021 | 8 |
| Italian Albums (FIMI) | 2022 | 12 |
| Italian Albums (FIMI) | 2023 | 24 |
| Italian Albums (FIMI) | 2024 | 51 |

== Certifications ==
| Region | Certification | Certified units/sales |
|---|---|---|
| Italy (FIMI) | 6× Platinum | 300,000^{‡} |
^{‡} Sales+streaming figures based on certification alone.
