= Rubami la notte =

Single by Pinguini Tattici Nucleari

from the album Fake News
- Released: 19 May 2023
- Genre: Pop rock
- Length: 3:09
- Label: Sony Music
- Songwriters: Riccardo Zanotti; Lorenzo Vizzini; Marco Paganelli; Enrico Brun
- Producers: Riccardo Zanotti; Enrico Brun; Marco Paganelli

Pinguini Tattici Nucleari singles chronology
"Coca zero" (2023)	"Rubami la notte" (2023)	"Nightmares" (2023)

Music video
- "Rubami la notte" on YouTube

"Rubami la notte" (transl. Steal my night) is a song by Italian band Pinguini Tattici Nucleari. It was released by Sony Music on 19 May 2023 as the second single from the digital re-issue of their fifth studio album Fake News.

The song peaked at number 5 on the FIMI singles chart and was certified quadruple platinum in Italy.

== Music video ==
The music video for the song, directed by Francesco Lorusso, was released on YouTube on 26 May 2023.

== Charts ==
=== Weekly charts ===
Weekly chart performance for "Rubami la notte"
Chart (2023)	Peak position
Italy (FIMI)	5
Italy Airplay (EarOne)	1

=== Year-end charts ===
Year-end chart performance for "Rubami la notte"
Chart (2023)	Position
Italy (FIMI)	15
Chart (2024)	Position
Italy (FIMI)	84

== Certifications ==
Region	Certification	Certified units/sales
Italy (FIMI)	4× Platinum	400,000^{‡}
^{‡} Sales+streaming figures based on certification alone.
