= Ridere =

Single by Pinguini Tattici Nucleari

from the album Fuori dall'hype - Ringo Starr
- Released: 17 April 2020
- Genre: Pop rock
- Length: 3:34
- Label: Sony Music
- Songwriter: Riccardo Zanotti

Pinguini Tattici Nucleari singles chronology
| "Ringo Starr" (2020) | "Ridere" (2020) | "La storia infinita" (2020) |

Music video
- "Ridere" on YouTube

"Ridere" is a song by Italian band Pinguini Tattici Nucleari. It was released by Sony Music on 17 April 2020 as the second single from the reissue of fourth studio album Fuori dall'hype.

The song, although not reaching beyond the 28th position, has accumulated a total of 18 months on the FIMI singles chart. It was certified sextuple platinum in Italy.

== Music video ==
The music video for the song was released on YouTube on 28 April 2020. The band relied on their fans during the lockdown caused by the COVID-19 pandemic, involving them by asking for clips that were later edited into the final video.

== Charts ==
=== Weekly charts ===
Weekly chart performance for "Ridere"
| Chart (2020) | Peak position |
|---|---|
| Italy (FIMI) | 28 |
| Italy Airplay (EarOne) | 11 |

=== Year-end charts ===
Year-end chart performance for "Ridere"
| Chart (2020) | Position |
|---|---|
| Italy (FIMI) | 38 |
| Chart (2021) | Position |
| Italy (FIMI) | 64 |
| Chart (2022) | Position |
| Italy (FIMI) | 94 |

== Certifications ==
| Region | Certification | Certified units/sales |
|---|---|---|
| Italy (FIMI) | 6× Platinum | 600,000^{‡} |
^{‡} Sales+streaming figures based on certification alone.
