= La tana del granchio =

2025 song by Bresh

Single by Bresh

from the album Mediterraneo
- Language: Italian
- Released: 12 February 2025
- Genre: Pop
- Label: Sony
- Composers: Giorgio De Lauri; Luca Di Biasi; Luca Ghiazzi
- Lyricist: Andrea Emanuele Brasi
- Producers: Dibla; Jiz; Shune

Bresh singles chronology
"Good Girl" (2024)	"La tana del granchio" (2025)	"Umore marea" (2025)

Music video
- "La tana del granchio" on YouTube

"La tana del granchio" (Italian pronunciation: [la ˈtaːna del ˈɡraŋkjo]; transl. "The Crab's Den") is a song written and recorded by Italian singer Bresh, released by Sony on 12 February 2025 as the fourth single from his third studio album, Mediterraneo. It competed in the Sanremo Music Festival 2025, finishing eleventh.

== Music video ==
A music video of "La tana del granchio", directed by Emanuele Cantò, was released on 12 February 2025 via Bresh's YouTube channel.

== Charts ==
=== Weekly charts ===
Weekly chart performance for "La tana del granchio"
Chart (2025)	Peak position
Italy (FIMI)	8
Italy Airplay (EarOne)	26
Switzerland (Schweizer Hitparade)	77

=== Year-end charts ===
Year-end chart performance for "La tana del granchio"
Chart (2025)	Position
Italy (FIMI)	27

== Certifications ==
Certifications for "La tana del granchio"
Region	Certification	Certified units/sales
Italy (FIMI)	Platinum	200,000^{‡}
^{‡} Sales+streaming figures based on certification alone.
