= Ringo Starr (song) =

Single by Pinguini Tattici Nucleari

from the album Fuori dall'hype - Ringo Starr
- Released: 6 February 2020
- Genre: Pop rock
- Length: 3:03
- Label: Sony Music
- Songwriter: Riccardo Zanotti
- Producer: Fabrizio Ferraguzzo

Pinguini Tattici Nucleari singles chronology
"Fuori dall'hype" (2019)	"Ringo Starr" (2020)	"Ridere" (2020)

Music video
- "Ringo Starr" on YouTube

"Ringo Starr" is a song by Italian band Pinguini Tattici Nucleari. It was released by Sony Music on 6 February 2020 as the first single from the reissue of fourth studio album Fuori dall'hype.

The song was the band's entry for the Sanremo Music Festival 2020, the 70th edition of Italy's musical festival, where it placed 3rd in the grand final. "Ringo Starr" peaked at number 3 on the weekly Italian FIMI Singles Chart and was certified quadruple platinum in Italy.

== Music video ==
The music video for the song was released on YouTube on 6 February 2020, to accompany the single's release. Directed by William9, the video is a parody of the film Back to the Future, with the frontman Riccardo Zanotti acting as Marty McFly during the school ball scene.

== Charts ==
=== Weekly charts ===
Weekly chart performance for "Ringo Starr"
Chart (2020)	Peak position
Italy (FIMI)	3
Italy Airplay (EarOne)	1

=== Year-end charts ===
Year-end chart performance for "Ringo Starr"
Chart (2020)	Position
Italy (FIMI)	24

== Certifications ==
Region	Certification	Certified units/sales
Italy (FIMI)	4× Platinum	400,000^{‡}
^{‡} Sales+streaming figures based on certification alone.
