= Fuori dall'hype =

Studio album by Pinguini Tattici Nucleari
- Released: 5 April 2019
- Genre: Pop; indie pop
- Length: 39:16
- Label: Sony Music Italy
- Producer: Riccardo Zanotti

Pinguini Tattici Nucleari chronology
Gioventù brucata (2017)	Fuori dall'hype (2019)	Ahia! (2020)

Fuori dall'hype - Ringo Starr cover

Singles from Fuori dall'hype
- 1. "Verdura" Released: 18 January 2019; 2. "Sashimi" Released: 1 March 2019; 3. "Fuori dall'hype" Released: 15 March 2019; 4. "Ringo Starr" Released: 4 February 2020; 5. "Ridere" Released: 17 April 2020

Fuori dall'hype is the fourth studio album by Italian band Pinguini Tattici Nucleari. The album was released by Sony Music on 5 April 2019. It debuted and peaked at number twelve on the Italian Albums Chart, becoming the band's first entry. On 7 February 2020, the album was reissued as an expanded version titled Fuori dall'hype - Ringo Starr, which contains the title track "Ringo Starr", the song that the band participated with at the Sanremo Music Festival 2020. The reissued edition reached number two on the FIMI charts, making it the band's highest peak at that time.

== Track listing ==
All tracks are written by Riccardo Zanotti

Fuori dall'hype – Standard edition
No.	Title	Length
1.	"Fuori dall'hype"	3:50
2.	"Antartide"	4:35
3.	"Lake Washington Boulevard"	3:48
4.	"Monopoli"	3:57
5.	"Nonono"	3:31
6.	"Scatole"	4:35
7.	"Sashimi"	3:50
8.	"La banalità del mare"	3:12
9.	"Verdura"	3:29
10.	"Freddie"	4:57
Total length:		39:16

Fuori dall'hype - Ringo Starr
No.	Title	Length
1.	"Ringo Starr"	3:03
2.	"Ridere"	3:34
3.	"Bergamo"	4:48
4.	"Fuori dall'hype"	3:50
5.	"Antartide"	4:35
6.	"Lake Washington Boulevard"	3:48
7.	"Monopoli"	3:57
8.	"Nonono"	3:31
9.	"Scatole"	4:35
10.	"Sashimi"	3:50
11.	"La banalità del mare"	3:12
12.	"Verdura"	3:29
13.	"Freddie"	4:57
14.	"Cancelleria (Live @ RCA Studio)"	5:52
15.	"Irene (Acoustic Version)"	4:38
Total length:		61:11

== Singles ==
Single	Chart (2019)	Peak position	Certification
"Verdura"	Italian Singles Chart	98	ITA: Platinum
Single	Chart (2020)	Peak position	Certification
"Ringo Starr"	Italian Singles Chart	3	ITA: 4× Platinum
"Ridere"	Italian Singles Chart	28	ITA: 6× Platinum

== Chart performance ==
=== Weekly charts ===
Fuori dall'hype

Chart (2019)	Peak position
Italian Albums (FIMI)	12

Fuori dall'hype - Ringo Starr

Chart (2020)	Peak position
Italian Albums (FIMI)	2

=== Year-end charts ===
Chart (2019)	Position
Italian Albums (FIMI)	76
Chart (2020)	Position
Italian Albums (FIMI)	8
Chart (2021)	Position
Italian Albums (FIMI)	19
Chart (2022)	Position
Italian Albums (FIMI)	24
Chart (2023)	Position
Italian Albums (FIMI)	33
Chart (2024)	Position
Italian Albums (FIMI)	42
Chart (2025)	Position
Italian Albums (FIMI)	62

== Certifications ==
Region	Certification	Certified units/sales
Italy (FIMI)	6× Platinum	300,000^{‡}
^{‡} Sales+streaming figures based on certification alone.
