= Islanda =

Single by Pinguini Tattici Nucleari

from the album Hello World
- Released: 15 November 2024
- Genre: Pop rock
- Length: 3:37
- Label: Epic; Sony Music
- Songwriters: Riccardo Zanotti; Marco Paganelli; Giorgio Pesenti
- Producers: Riccardo Zanotti; Marco Paganelli; Okgiorgio

Pinguini Tattici Nucleari singles chronology
"Romantico ma muori" (2024)	"Islanda" (2024)	"Bottiglie vuote" (2025)

Music video
- "Islanda" on YouTube

"Islanda" ("Iceland") is a song by Italian band Pinguini Tattici Nucleari. It was released by Sony Music on 15 November 2024 as the second single from the band's sixth studio album Hello World.

The song topped the Italian singles chart and was certified platinum in Italy.

== Music video ==
The music video for the song, directed by Stefano Lorenz, was released on YouTube on 15 November 2024, to accompany the single's release.

== Charts ==
=== Weekly charts ===
Weekly chart performance for "Islanda"
Chart (2024)	Peak position
Italy (FIMI)	1
Italy Airplay (EarOne)	1

=== Year-end charts ===
Year-end chart performance for "Islanda"
Chart (2025)	Position
Italy (FIMI)	16

== Certifications ==
Region	Certification	Certified units/sales
Italy (FIMI)	2× Platinum	400,000^{‡}
^{‡} Sales+streaming figures based on certification alone.
