= Bottiglie vuote =

Single by Pinguini Tattici Nucleari featuring Max Pezzali

from the album Hello World
- Released: 11 April 2025
- Length: 3:14
- Label: Island
- Songwriters: Riccardo Zanotti; Marco Paganelli; Giorgio Pesenti

Pinguini Tattici Nucleari singles chronology
| "Islanda" (2024) | "Bottiglie vuote" (2025) | "Amaro" (2025) |

Max Pezzali singles chronology
| "Discoteche abbandonate" (2024) | "Bottiglie vuote" (2025) | "Come nei film" (2026) |

Music video
- "Bottiglie vuote" on YouTube

"Bottiglie vuote" (transl. Empty bottles) is a song by Italian pop rock band Pinguini Tattici Nucleari. It was originally published as the thirteenth track of the band's sixth studio album Hello World in December 2024 by Island Records. A new version featuring Italian singer Max Pezzali was released as a single on 11 April 2025 and included in the digital re-issue of the same album.

== Music video ==
A music video for "Bottiglie vuote" featuring Pezzali, directed by Marco Braia, was released onto YouTube on 11 April 2025.

== Charts ==
=== Weekly charts ===
Weekly chart performance for "Bottiglie vuote"
| Chart (2025) | Peak position |
|---|---|
| Italy (FIMI) | 4 |
| Italy Airplay (EarOne) | 1 |

=== Year-end charts ===
Year-end chart performance for "Bottiglie vuote"
| Chart (2025) | Position |
|---|---|
| Italy (FIMI) | 14 |

== Certifications ==
| Region | Certification | Certified units/sales |
|---|---|---|
| Italy (FIMI) | 2× Platinum | 400,000^{‡} |
^{‡} Sales+streaming figures based on certification alone.
