= La storia infinita =

Single by Pinguini Tattici Nucleari

from the EP Ahia!
- Released: 28 August 2020
- Genre: Pop rock
- Length: 3:27
- Label: Sony Music
- Songwriter: Riccardo Zanotti
- Producers: Fabrizio Ferraguzzo; Enrico Brun

Pinguini Tattici Nucleari singles chronology
"Ridere" (2020)	"La storia infinita" (2020)	"Scooby Doo" (2020)

Music video
- "La storia infinita" on YouTube

"La storia infinita" (transl. The neverending story) is a song by Italian band Pinguini Tattici Nucleari. It was released by Sony Music on 28 August 2020 as the lead single from their extended play Ahia!.

The song peaked at number 14 on the FIMI singles chart and was certified triple platinum in Italy.

== Music video ==
The music video for the song, directed by William9, was released on YouTube on 9 September 2020.

== Charts ==
=== Weekly charts ===
Weekly chart performance for "La storia infinita"
Chart (2020)	Peak position
Italy (FIMI)	14
Italy Airplay (EarOne)	18

=== Year-end charts ===
Year-end chart performance for "La storia infinita"
Chart (2020)	Position
Italy (FIMI)	81

== Certifications ==
Region	Certification	Certified units/sales
Italy (FIMI)	3× Platinum	300,000^{‡}
^{‡} Sales+streaming figures based on certification alone.
