= Parafulmini =

Single by Ernia, Bresh and Fabri Fibra

from the album Io non ho paura
- Released: 26 May 2023
- Recorded: 2023
- Length: 3:29
- Label: Island; Universal
- Songwriters: Matteo Professione; Andrea Emanuele Brasi; Fabrizio Tarducci; Davide Petrella; Edoardo D'Erme; Stefano Tognini
- Producer: Zef

Ernia singles chronology
"Lewandowski X" (2023)	"Parafulmini" (2023)	"Per un fra" (2023)

Bresh singles chronology
"Altamente mia" (2023)	"Parafulmini" (2023)	"Nightmares" (2023)

Fabri Fibra singles chronology
"Universo" (2022)	"Parafulmini" (2023)	"Obladi oblada" (2023)

Music video
- "Parafulmini" on YouTube

"Parafulmini" is a song by Italian rappers Ernia, Bresh and Fabri Fibra. It was released on 26 May 2023 through Universal Music Italy and Island Records as the third single from Ernia's fourth studio album Io non ho paura.

== Composition ==
It was written by the artists with Davide Petrella and produced by Zef. In an interview with Il Secolo XIX, Ernia explained the meaning of the song and its writing process:

In the studio with Zef, he plays me the refrain top line, the one that in the released version is sung by Bresh, and it hits me right away. We also wanted to put in some funk. [...] I wanted textually to tell pieces about us. In short, "Parafulmini" is a summer song that, however, has nothing caricatured about it.

== Music video ==
A music video for "Parafulmini", directed by Fabrizio Conte, was released onto YouTube on 6 June 2023.

== Charts ==
Weekly chart performance for "Parafulmini"
Chart (2023)	Peak position
Italy (FIMI)	13
Italy Airplay (EarOne)	1

== Certifications ==
Region	Certification	Certified units/sales
Italy (FIMI)	3× Platinum	300,000^{‡}
^{‡} Sales+streaming figures based on certification alone.
