= Hello World (Pinguini Tattici Nucleari album) =

Studio album by Pinguini Tattici Nucleari
- Released: 6 December 2024
- Length: 46:50
- Label: Sony
- Producers: Riccardo Zanotti; Marco Paganelli; Okgiorgio; Enrico Brun

Pinguini Tattici Nucleari chronology
Fake News (2022)	Hello World (2024)

Singles from Hello World
- 1. "Romantico ma muori" Released: 13 September 2024; 2. "Islanda" Released: 15 November 2024; 3. "Bottiglie vuote" Released: 11 April 2025; 4. "Amaro" Released: 26 September 2025

Hello World is the sixth studio album by the Italian band Pinguini Tattici Nucleari. It was released on 6 December 2024 by Sony Music Italy.

The release of the album was preceded by the singles "Romantico ma muori" and "Islanda". Hello World topped the Italian Albums Chart and was certified quadruple platinum by the Federazione Industria Musicale Italiana.

== Track listing ==
Hello World track listing
No.	Title	Producer(s)	Length
1.	"Hello World"	Riccardo Zanotti; Marco Paganelli; Okgiorgio	1:31
2.	"Per non sentire la fine del mondo"	Zanotti; Paganelli; Okgiorgio	3:00
3.	"Islanda"	Zanotti; Paganelli; Okgiorgio	3:37
4.	"Burnout"	Zanotti; Paganelli	2:59
5.	"Nevica"	Zanotti; Paganelli; Okgiorgio	3:08
6.	"Your Dog"	Zanotti; Paganelli; Okgiorgio	2:53
7.	"Amaro"	Zanotti; Paganelli; Okgiorgio	3:33
8.	"Alieni"	Zanotti; Paganelli	2:36
9.	"Fuck You Vincenzo"	Zanotti; Paganelli; Okgiorgio	3:13
10.	"Romantico ma muori"	Zanotti; Paganelli; Okgiorgio	2:46
11.	"Piccola volpe"	Zanotti; Paganelli; Okgiorgio	2:52
12.	"Nativi digitali"	Zanotti; Paganelli	4:04
13.	"Bottiglie vuote"	Zanotti; Paganelli; Okgiorgio	3:15
14.	"Migliore"	Zanotti; Enrico Brun	4:34
15.	"Titoli di coda"	Zanotti; Paganelli	3:22

Hello World digital re-issue
No.	Title	Producer(s)	Length
1.	"Bottiglie vuote" (featuring Max Pezzali)	Riccardo Zanotti; Marco Paganelli; Okgiorgio	3:14

== Charts ==
=== Weekly charts ===
Chart (2024)	Peak position
Italian Albums (FIMI)	1

=== Year-end charts ===
Chart	Year	Position
Italian Albums (FIMI)	2024	29

== Certifications ==
Region	Certification	Certified units/sales
Italy (FIMI)	4× Platinum	200,000^{‡}
^{‡} Sales+streaming figures based on certification alone.

== Year-end lists ==
Selected year-end rankings of Hello World
Publication	List	Rank	Ref.
Open	The 25 Best Italian Albums of 2024	4	
