= Nightmares (Bresh song) =

Single by Bresh and Pinguini Tattici Nucleari
- Released: 29 September 2023
- Length: 3:21
- Label: Epic; Sony
- Songwriters: Andrea Emanuele Brasi; Riccardo Zanotti; Enrico Brun
- Producers: Riccardo Zanotti; Enrico Brun

Bresh singles chronology
| "Parafulmini" (2023) | "Nightmares" (2023) | "Torcida" (2024) |

Pinguini Tattici Nucleari singles chronology
| "Rubami la notte" (2023) | "Nightmares" (2024) | "Romantico ma muori" (2024) |

Music video
- "Nightmares" on YouTube

"Nightmares" is a song by Italian singer Bresh and Italian pop/rock band Pinguini Tattici Nucleari. It was released by Epic and Sony on 29 September 2023.

The song was written by Bresh, PTN's frontman Riccardo Zanotti and Enrico Brun, and produced by Zanotti and Brun. It topped the Italian singles chart and was certified double platinum in Italy.

== Music video ==
The music video for "Nightmares", directed by Fabrizio Conte, was released on the same day via Bresh's YouTube channel.

== Charts ==
=== Weekly charts ===
Weekly chart performance for "Nightmares"
| Chart (2023) | Peak position |
|---|---|
| Italy (FIMI) | 1 |
| Italy Airplay (EarOne) | 2 |

=== Year-end charts ===
2024 year-end chart performance for "Nightmares"
| Chart (2024) | Position |
|---|---|
| Italy (FIMI) | 79 |

== Certifications ==
| Region | Certification | Certified units/sales |
|---|---|---|
| Italy (FIMI) | 2× Platinum | 200,000^{‡} |
^{‡} Sales+streaming figures based on certification alone.
