= Destri =

Destri is a surname. Notable people with the surname include:

- Jimmy Destri (born 1954), American musician.
- Maurício Destri (born 1991), Brazilian actor.
- Sonia Destri Lie, Brazilian dancer and choreographer.

== See also ==
- Destri (song)
- Destro (surname)
