= Shakerando =

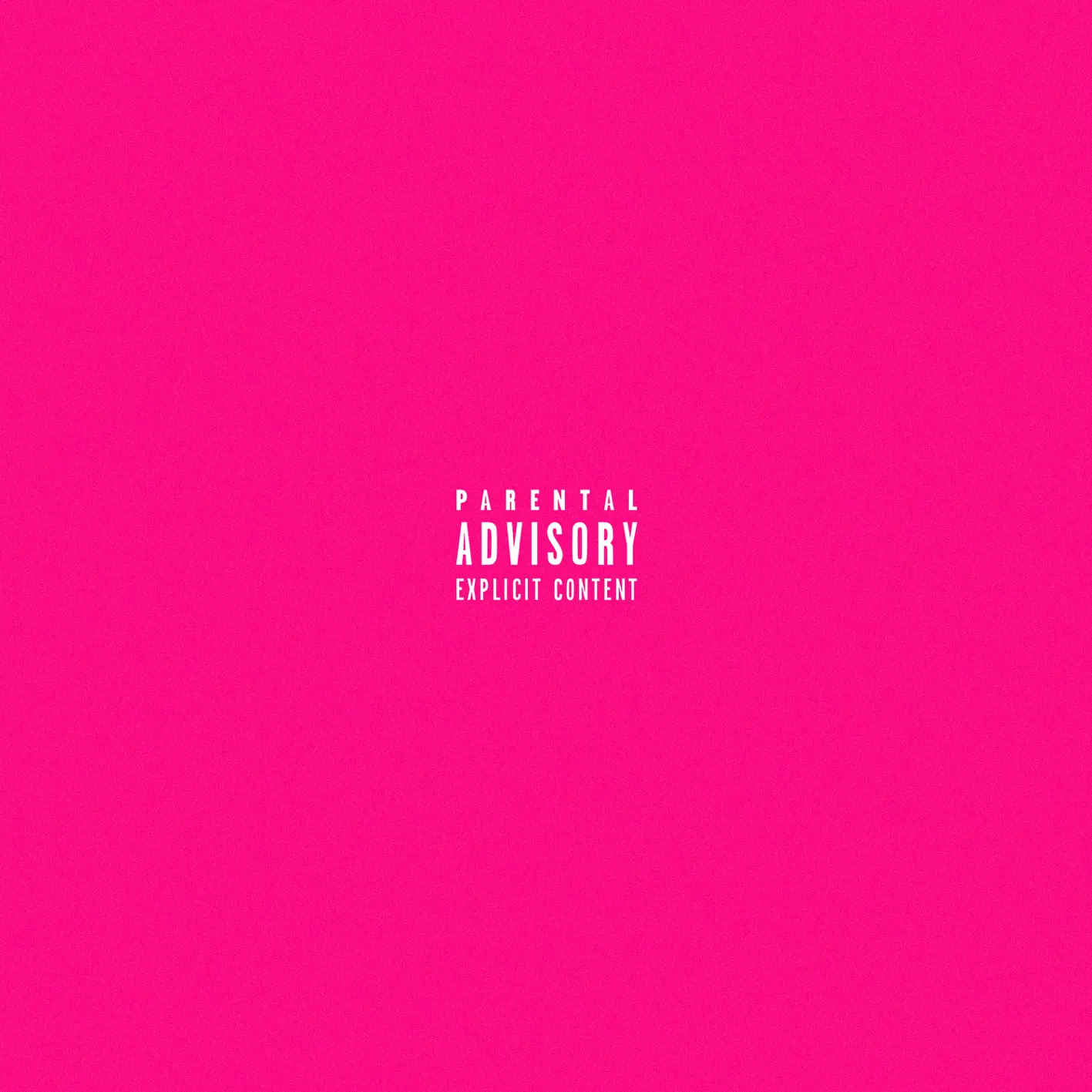
- Official cover

Single by Rhove
- Released: 15 December 2021
- Length: 3:15
- Label: Milano Ovest; Universal
- Songwriters: Rhove; Nassim Diane
- Producer: Voluptyk

Rhove singles chronology
"Jungle" (2021)	"Shakerando" (2021)	"La province 1" (2022)

Music video
- "Shakerando" on YouTube

"Shakerando" is a song by Italian rapper Rhove. It was produced by Voluptyk and released on 15 December 2021 by Universal Music.

The song topped the Italian singles chart for seven weeks, becoming a summer hit and the second best-selling song of 2022 in Italy. It was certified six times platinum by FIMI.

== Music video ==
The music video for "Shakerando", directed by Peter Marvu, was released on 22 December 2021 via Rhove's YouTube channel.

== Charts ==
=== Weekly charts ===
Weekly chart performance for "Shakerando"
Chart (2022)	Peak position
Italy (FIMI)	1
Italy Airplay (EarOne)	8
Switzerland (Schweizer Hitparade)	54

=== Year-end charts ===
2022 year-end chart performance for "Shakerando"
Chart	Position
Italy (FIMI)	2

2023 year-end chart performance for "Shakerando"
Chart	Position
Italy (FIMI)	98

== Certifications ==
Region	Certification	Certified units/sales
Italy (FIMI)	7× Platinum	700,000^{‡}
^{‡} Sales+streaming figures based on certification alone.
