= Destro (surname) =

Destro (literally Right (opposite of left)) is an Italian surname. Notable people and fictional characters with the surname include:

== People ==
- Elizabeth Destro, American film producer
- Flavio Destro (born 1962), Italian footballer and manager
- Giustina Destro (born 1945), Italian politician and entrepreneur
- Mattia Destro (born 1991), Italian footballer
- Robert Destro, American attorney, academic, and government official

== Fictional characters ==
- Destro, a fictional character in the G.I. Joe universe

== See also ==
- Destro (disambiguation)
