= Scrivile scemo =

Single by Pinguini Tattici Nucleari

from the album Ahia!
- Released: 23 April 2021
- Recorded: 2020
- Length: 3:34
- Label: RCA; Sony Music
- Songwriter: Riccardo Zanotti
- Producers: Fabrizio Ferraguzzo; Enrico Brun

Pinguini Tattici Nucleari singles chronology
| "Ferma a guardare" (2021) | "Scrivile scemo" (2021) | "Pastello bianco" (2021) |

Music video
- "Scrivile scemo" on YouTube

"Scrivile scemo" (transl. Text her, you moron) is a song by Italian band Pinguini Tattici Nucleari.

It was originally published as the second track of the EP Ahia! in December 2020, and then released as a radio single by Sony Music on 23 April 2021.

The song peaked at number 11 on the Italian singles chart and was certified quintuple platinum in Italy.

== Music video ==
The music video for the song, directed by William9 and Giorgio Scorza, was released on YouTube on 7 June 2021.

== Charts ==
=== Weekly charts ===
Weekly chart performance for "Scrivile scemo"
| Chart (2021) | Peak position |
|---|---|
| Italy (FIMI) | 11 |
| Italy Airplay (EarOne) | 8 |
| San Marino (SMRRTV Top 50) | 16 |

=== Year-end charts ===
2021 year-end chart performance for "Scrivile scemo"
| Chart | Position |
|---|---|
| Italy (FIMI) | 19 |

2022 year-end chart performance for "Scrivile scemo"
| Chart | Position |
|---|---|
| Italy (FIMI) | 62 |

== Certifications ==
| Region | Certification | Certified units/sales |
|---|---|---|
| Italy (FIMI) | 5× Platinum | 500,000^{‡} |
^{‡} Sales+streaming figures based on certification alone.
