= Rocky Roberts =

American singer

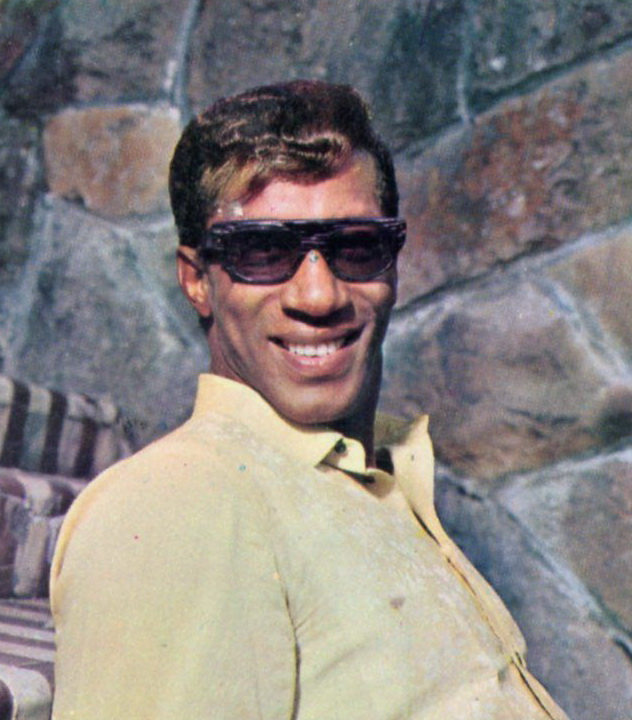

Background information
- Born: Charles Roberts; August 23, 1940; Tanner, Alabama, U.S.
- Died: January 14, 2005 (aged 64) Rome, Italy
- Genres: R&B; Southern soul
- Occupation: Singer
- Years active: 1960–2004
- Labels: Vis Radio; RGE; Barclay; Decca; Ariston; Durium; London; Parrot

Charles "Rocky" 'Roberts (August 23, 1940 – January 13, 2005) was an American naturalized Italian rhythm and blues singer.

Born in Tanner, Alabama, Roberts served in the United States Navy and was a Navy champion boxer. He first got interested in singing after listening to a country-oriented musician named Doug Fowlkes, whose band the Airdales (US-navy slang for Navy pilots) used to perform on the ship where Roberts was stationed. Fowlkes, impressed by Roberts' voice, eventually agreed to let him sit in with the band.

Roberts won a singing competition while on shore leave in Juan-les-Pins, France, and chose to stay in Europe after retiring from the Navy in 1962.

Roberts had a stint in France performing at ORTF television show Les raisins verts, and achieved some success with an early version of "T-Bird" and "Monkiss".

In 1965 Renzo Arbore and Gianni Boncompagni invited Roberts to Rome to record the theme of their Radio Show, Bandiera Gialla. The song, "T-Bird", was a hit in the Italian charts and Roberts settled in Rome.

In 1967, Roberts had a major Italian hit, "Stasera mi butto", which sold 3.7 million copies and won the Festivalbar. The song's success led to a 1967 motion picture of the same title, starring Roberts. He appeared subsequently in several other Italian films.

He was known for always wearing dark sunglasses.

Roberts sang the Luis Bacalov-written theme song from the 1966 film, Django. Quentin Tarantino reused the recording as the opening theme for his 2012 film Django Unchained.

He died of lung cancer in Rome in 2005 at the age of 64.

== Filmography ==
Year	Title	Role	Notes
1967	Non mi dire mai good-bye		
1967	Stasera mi butto	Himself	
1967	Una ragazza tutta d'oro	Himself	
1968	I ragazzi di Bandiera Gialla	Himself	
1969	Il ragazzo che sorride	Rocky	(final film role)
