= Fake News (album) =

Studio album by Pinguini Tattici Nucleari
- Released: 2 December 2022
- Length: 51:01
- Label: Sony
- Producer: Riccardo Zanotti; Enrico Brun; Marco Paganelli; Okgiorgio

Pinguini Tattici Nucleari chronology
Ahia! (2020)	Fake News (2022)	Hello World (2024)

Singles from Fake News
- 1. "Giovani Wannabe" Released: 27 May 2022; 2. "Dentista Croazia" Released: 19 August 2022; 3. "Ricordi" Released: 23 September 2022; 4. "Coca zero" Released: 31 March 2023; 5. "Rubami la notte" Released: 19 May 2023

Fake News is the fifth studio album by the Italian band Pinguini Tattici Nucleari. It was released on 2 December 2022 by Sony Music Italy.

Preceded by the singles "Giovani Wannabe", "Dentista Croazia", and "Ricordi", the release of the album was celebrated with a dedicated exhibition in Milan. Fake News topped the Italian Albums Chart and was certified five times platinum by the Federazione Industria Musicale Italiana.

== Track listing ==
Fake News track listing
No.	Title	Producer(s)	Length
1.	"Zen"	Riccardo Zanotti; Enrico Brun; Marco Paganelli	3:23
2.	"L'ultima volta"	Zanotti; Brun	3:02
3.	"Hold on"	Zanotti; Brun; Paganelli	3:24
4.	"Stage Diving"	Zanotti; Brun; Paganelli	3:50
5.	"Ricordi"	Zanotti; Brun; Okgiorgio	3:23
6.	"Melting Pop"	Zanotti; Brun; Paganelli	3:29
7.	"Forse"	Zanotti; Brun	4:06
8.	"Fede"	Zanotti; Brun; Okgiorgio	3:42
9.	"Dentista Croazia"	Zanotti; Brun	4:23
10.	"Hikikomori"	Zanotti; Brun; Paganelli	3:27
11.	"Giovani Wannabe"	Zanotti; Brun; Paganelli	3:34
12.	"Barfly"	Zanotti; Brun	3:57
13.	"Non sono cool"	Zanotti; Brun; Paganelli; Okgiorgio	2:41
14.	"Cena di classe"	Zanotti; Brun; Paganelli	4:34

Fake News digital re-issue
No.	Title	Producer(s)	Length
1.	"Rubami la notte"	Riccardo Zanotti; Enrico Brun; Marco Paganelli	3:10
2.	"Coca zero"	Zanotti; Brun; Okgiorgio	3:23

== Charts ==
=== Weekly charts ===
Chart (2022)	Peak position
Italian Albums (FIMI)	1
Swiss Albums (Schweizer Hitparade)	85

=== Year-end charts ===
Chart	Year	Position
Italian Albums (FIMI)	2022	32
Italian Albums (FIMI)	2023	4
Italian Albums (FIMI)	2024	20

== Certifications ==
Region	Certification	Certified units/sales
Italy (FIMI)	6× Platinum	300,000^{‡}
^{‡} Sales+streaming figures based on certification alone.

== Year-end lists ==
Selected year-end rankings of Fake News
Publication	List	Rank	Ref.
AGI	The 50 Best Italian Albums of 2022	4	
All Music	The 15 Best Italian Albums of 2022	4	
