= Settevoci =

1966 Italian musical variety show

- Presented by: Pippo Baudo
- Country of origin: Italy
- Original language: Italian
- No. of seasons: 4

Original release
- Network: Rai 1
- Release: February 6, 1966 – June 28, 1970

Settevoci ("Seven Voices") is an Italian musical variety show broadcast by Rai 1 (at the time called "Programma Nazionale") from 1966 to 1970, hosted by Pippo Baudo and aired on Sunday afternoon. The program was a large success, and contributed to launch the careers of many artists, including Albano Carrisi, Massimo Ranieri, Nicola Di Bari, Orietta Berti and Marisa Sannia. It also marked the first personal success for the presenter Baudo.

The show consisted of a contest with singers combined in couples, and included a quiz to test their knowledge in the music field. The final results were eventually determined through a clap-o-meter.
