= Bresh =

Italian singer-songwriter and rapper (born 1996)

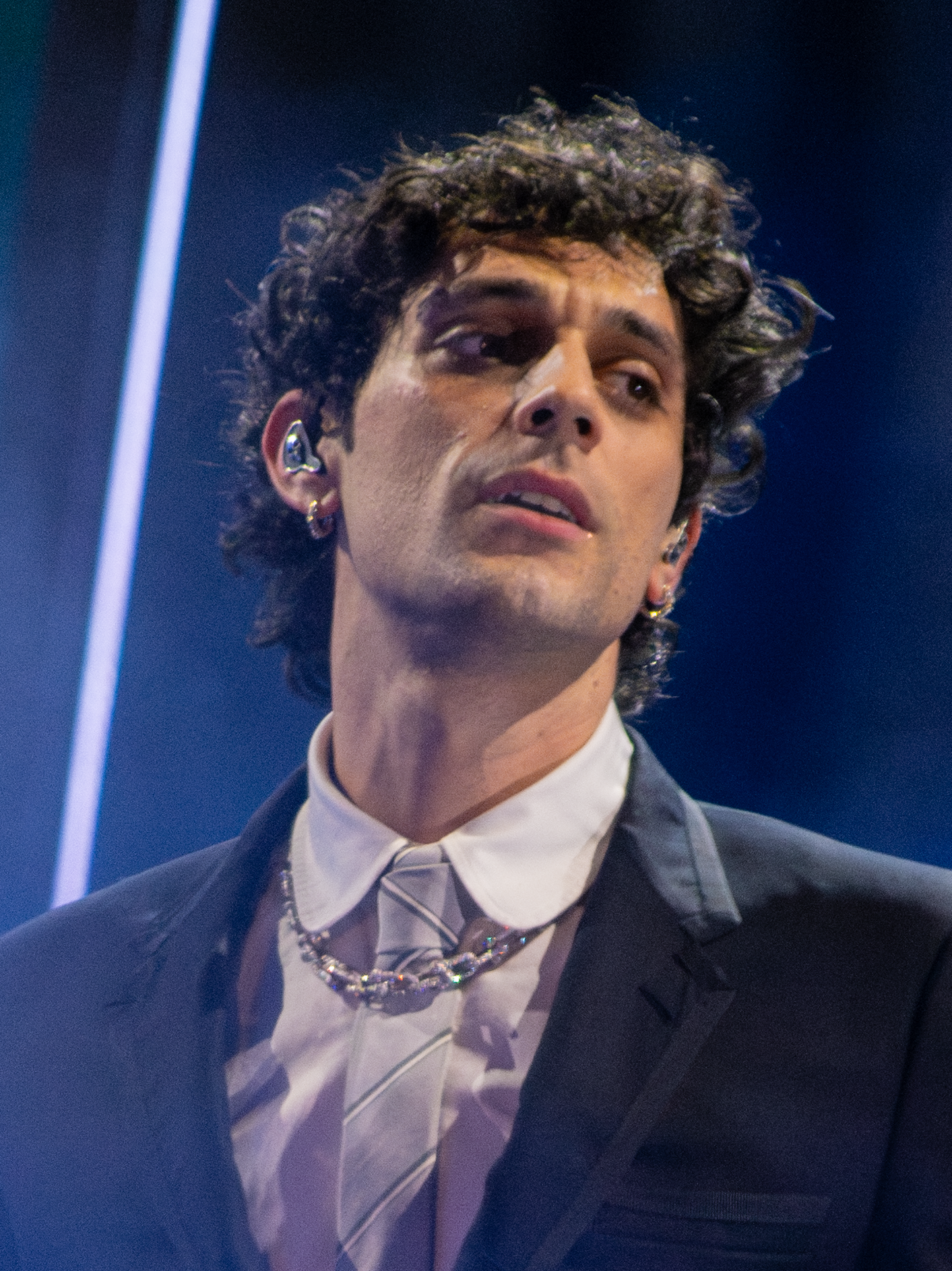
- Bresh as a guest performer during the Sanremo Music Festival 2026

Background information
- Born: Andrea Emanuele Brasi; 28 June 1996 (age 30); Lavagna, Italy
- Genres: Pop rap; hip hop
- Occupations: Singer; songwriter; rapper
- Instrument: Vocals
- Years active: 2012–present
- Labels: Epic; Sony Music

Andrea Emanuele Brasi (born 28 June 1996), known professionally as Bresh, is an Italian singer-songwriter and rapper. He is part of Drilliguria, a collective made up of many of the most notable Ligurian rappers, as well as the Milan collective Zona4gang.

Since the release of his breakout single "Angelina Jolie" in early 2021, Bresh has sold over one million singles in Italy. In 2023, he topped the Italian singles chart twice with the tracks "Guasto d'amore" and "Nightmares". In August 2023, he was awarded the Lunezia Prize in recognition of the musical and lyrical merit of his song "Altamente mia". He competed in the Sanremo Music Festival 2025 with the song "La tana del granchio".

== Career ==
=== 2012–2019: Career beginnings ===
Bresh grew up in Bogliasco, a small municipality in the Province of Genoa where, around the age of 15, he started his musical career. In 2012, he released his first mixtape titled Cambiamenti, together with G Pillola, then known as Gughi P. In 2013, his second project titled Cosa vogliamo fare was released. Both projects contain a number of collaborations with emerging local artists, such as Izi, Vaz Tè, Tedua, Dala Pai Pai and Nader Shah, with whom he continued to collaborate in the following years.

Following the conclusion of his school studies, at the age of 19, Bresh moved to Milan, together with his friends and colleagues Rkomi, Tedua e Sonny Willa. Around this time, he wrote and released singles such as "Baghera", "Gaston" and "Prestigio", followed by "Snake", "Astronauti", "Pe Pe Pe", "Ande" and "Gazza ladra". On 3 August 2017, he released the music video of his single "Il bar dei miei" through the record label Thaurus.

=== 2019–2021: Che io mi aiuti ===
Following a period of hiatus, in 2019, Bresh was featured on Vaz Tè's track "Pesche e vino" along with Gianni Bismark and Sick Luke.

In 2020, he released the tracks "No Problem", "Oblò" with Rkomi and "Team" with Vaz Tè, ahead of the release of his first studio album, Che io mi aiuti, on 14 February 2020 through Epic Records and Sony Music. The album was re-released on 24 July 2020 with a number of previously unreleased songs including collaborations with Ketama126, Giaime, Disme and Vaz Tè. It was certified gold in Italy by FIMI.

=== 2021–2022: Oro blu ===
In 2021, Bresh released the single "Angelina Jolie", which was certified triple platinum in Italy for sales exceeding 300,000 copies. It was followed by the singles "Caffè" and "Andrea" in promotion of his second album, Oro blu. The album was released on 4 March 2021 and debuted atop the Italian albums chart.

In 2022, Bresh appeared in Claudio Cabona's docufilm La nuova scuola genovese, in which he discussed the musical characteristics of the Genoese school artistic movement, alongside prominent Genoese musicians such as Tedua, Izi and Vaz Tè. On 26 June 2022, he appeared for the second time at the Goa-Boa festival. He also featured on Camilla Magli's song "Kanye West", released on 1 July 2022.

=== 2023–present: Mediterraneo ===
On 27 January 2023, Bresh released the single "Guasto d'amore". The song describes his love for his football team, Genoa, and became a stadium chant for the team. In August 2023, his single "Altamente mia" was awarded the Lunezia Prize for its musical and lyrical quality. On 26 May 2023, he was featured on Ernia's single "Parafulmini", alongside Fabri Fibra. On 29 September 2023, he released the single "Nightmares" in collaboration with Pinguini Tattici Nucleari. Alongside Tedua, Bresh featured on the Tony Effe track "Dopo le 4", which reached number 2 on the Italian singles chart in April 2024. On 10 May 2024, he released the single "Torcida" which describes the desire to escape from the perpetual dissatisfaction of repeating the same mistakes. The title is taken from Brazilian Portuguese and refers to the loud supporters of football teams.

In December 2024, Bresh was announced as one of the participants in the Sanremo Music Festival 2025. He placed 11th with the song "La tana del granchio". On 21 May 2025, Bresh announced the album Mediterraneo, which was released on 6 June 2025. "Dai che fai" was released as the album's sixth single on 12 September 2025.

== Musical style ==
Bresh's musical style is primarily categorised as rap. His lyrics are often characterised by social issues, reflecting both the problems of his own life and of society as a whole. Many of his songs are autobiographical in nature, such as "Andrea". His singer-songwriter style has been compared to Fabrizio De André, who Bresh listened to from a young age.

== Discography ==
=== Studio albums ===
List of studio albums, with chart positions and certifications
Title	Details	Peak chart positions	Certifications
Title	Details	ITA	Certifications
Che io mi aiuti	Released: 14 February 2020; Label: Epic, Sony Music Italy; Format: CD, LP, digital download	11	FIMI: Platinum
Oro blu	Released: 4 March 2022; Label: Epic, Sony Music Italy; Format: CD, LP, digital download	1	FIMI: 2× Platinum
Mediterraneo	Released: 6 June 2025; Label: Epic, Sony Music Italy; Format: CD, LP, digital download	1	FIMI: 3× Platinum

=== Mixtapes ===
- 2012 – Cambiamenti mixtape (with Gughi P)
- 2013 – Cosa vogliamo fare

=== Singles ===
List of singles as lead artist, with selected chart positions, showing year released and album name
Title	Year	Peak chart positions	Certifications	Album
Title	Year	ITA	Certifications	Album
"Il bar dei miei"	2017	—		Non-album singles
"Astronauti"	2017	—		Non-album singles
"Lontano RMX"	2018	—		Non-album singles
"Snake"	2018	—		Non-album singles
"Pepepe"	2018	—		Non-album singles
"No Problem"	2019	—		Che io mi aiuti
"Oblò" (featuring Rkomi)	2019	—		Che io mi aiuti
"Team" (featuring Vaz Tè)	2020	—		Che io mi aiuti
"Girano" (featuring Izi)	2020	—	FIMI: Gold	Che io mi aiuti
"Angelina Jolie"	2021	29	FIMI: 4× Platinum	Oro blu
"Caffè"	2021	99	FIMI: Gold	Oro blu
"Andrea"	2022	21	FIMI: Platinum	Oro blu
"Parli di me" (featuring Rkomi)	2022	35		Oro blu
"Il meglio di te"	2022	54	FIMI: Platinum	Oro blu
"Guasto d'amore"	2023	1	FIMI: 5× Platinum	Mediterraneo
"Altamente mia"	2023	12	FIMI: 2× Platinum	Mediterraneo
"Parafulmini" (with Ernia and Fabri Fibra)	2023	13	FIMI: 3× Platinum	Io non ho paura
"Nightmares" (with Pinguini Tattici Nucleari)	2023	1	FIMI: 2× Platinum	Non-album single
"Torcida"	2024	9	FIMI: Platinum	Mediterraneo
"La tana del granchio"	2025	8	FIMI: Platinum	Mediterraneo
"Umore marea"	2025	16	FIMI: Gold	Mediterraneo
"Dai che fai"	2025	28	FIMI: Platinum	Mediterraneo
"Introvabile"	2026	16	FIMI: Gold	Mediterraneo (Dopo il Mare)
"Da Dio"	2026	5	FIMI: Platinum	Mediterraneo (Dopo il Mare)
"Serenamente" (with Juli)	2026	8	FIMI: Gold	Mediterraneo (Dopo il Mare)
"—" denotes a single that did not chart or was not released.

=== Other charted songs ===
List of other charted songs, with selected chart positions, showing year released and album name
Title	Year	Peak chart positions	Certifications	Album
Title	Year	ITA	Certifications	Album
"Ulisse"	2022	64		Oro blu
"Come stai" (featuring Izi)	2022	31	FIMI: Gold	Oro blu
"Alcool & acqua" (featuring Psicologi)	2022	46	FIMI: Platinum	Oro blu
"Svuotatasche"	2022	54	FIMI: Gold	Oro blu
"Amore" (featuring Greg Willen)	2022	90		Oro blu
"Fottiti" (featuring Tony Effe)	2022	73		Oro blu
"Se rinasco" (featuring Massimo Pericolo & Crookers)	2022	50		Oro blu
"Rotta maggiore (partenza)"	2025	75		Mediterraneo
"Capo Horn" (featuring Tedua)	2025	10		Mediterraneo
"Kamala"	2025	67		Mediterraneo
"Altezza cielo" (featuring Kid Yugi)	2025	17		Mediterraneo
"Agave"	2025	41		Mediterraneo
"Tarantola"	2025	89		Mediterraneo
"Erica" (featuring saYf)	2025	77		Mediterraneo
"Il limite" (featuring Achille Lauro)	2025	91		Mediterraneo
"—" denotes a single that did not chart or was not released.
