= Lisa dagli occhi blu =

Single by Mario Tessuto

from the album Lisa dagli occhi blu
- B-side: "Mi si ferma il cuore"
- Released: 1969
- Length: 4:30
- Label: CGD
- Songwriter(s): Claudio Cavallaro, Giancarlo Bigazzi

Mario Tessuto singles chronology
"Un uomo solo" (1968)	"Lisa dagli occhi blu" (1969)	"Nasino in su" (1969)

Audio
- "Lisa dagli occhi blu" on YouTube

"Lisa dagli occhi blu" (transl. 'Lisa with blue eyes') is a 1969 Italian song composed by Claudio Cavallaro (music) and Giancarlo Bigazzi (lyrics) and performed by Mario Tessuto. It is included in his debut album Lisa dagli occhi blu.

The song placed second at the 1969 Un disco per l'estate and topped the singles chart, marking Tessuto's breakthrough and becoming his signature song. The Lisa of the title was named after Cavallaro's grandmother. Described as "one of the iconic songs of the 1960s", the single sold over 1.000,000 copies.

The song was adapted into a musicarello film with the same title, directed by Bruno Corbucci and starring the same Tessuto and Silvia Dionisio.

Artists who covered the song include Nicola Di Bari, Gabi Novak, César Costa, Tommy Körberg, Enrico Simonetti, and Maurizio De Angelis.

== Track listing ==
No.	Title	Writer(s)	Length
1.	"Lisa dagli occhi blu"	Cavallaro, Bigazzi	3:16
2.	"Mi si ferma il cuore"	Cavallaro, Bigazzi, Tessuto	2:21

== Charts ==
Chart (1963)	Peak position
Italy (Musica e dischi)	1
