= European Review for Medical and Pharmacological Sciences =

- Discipline: Medicine, pharmacology
- Language: English
- Edited by: C. Ricordi, D. Della Morte Canosci

Publication details
- History: 1997–present
- Publisher: Verduci Editore
- Frequency: Biweekly
- Impact factor: 3.507 (2020)

Standard abbreviations
- ISO 4: Eur. Rev. Med. Pharmacol. Sci.

Indexing
- CODEN: RESFD
- ISSN: 1128-3602
- OCLC no.: 500089957

Links
- Journal homepage

The European Review for Medical and Pharmacological Sciences is a biweekly peer-reviewed medical journal. It is abstracted and indexed in Current Contents, Excerpta Medica, Index Medicus/MEDLINE/PubMed, Science Citation Index Expanded, and Scopus. The journal has been criticized for being a conduit for paper-mill-generated articles.
