= Marisa Sannia =

Italian singer

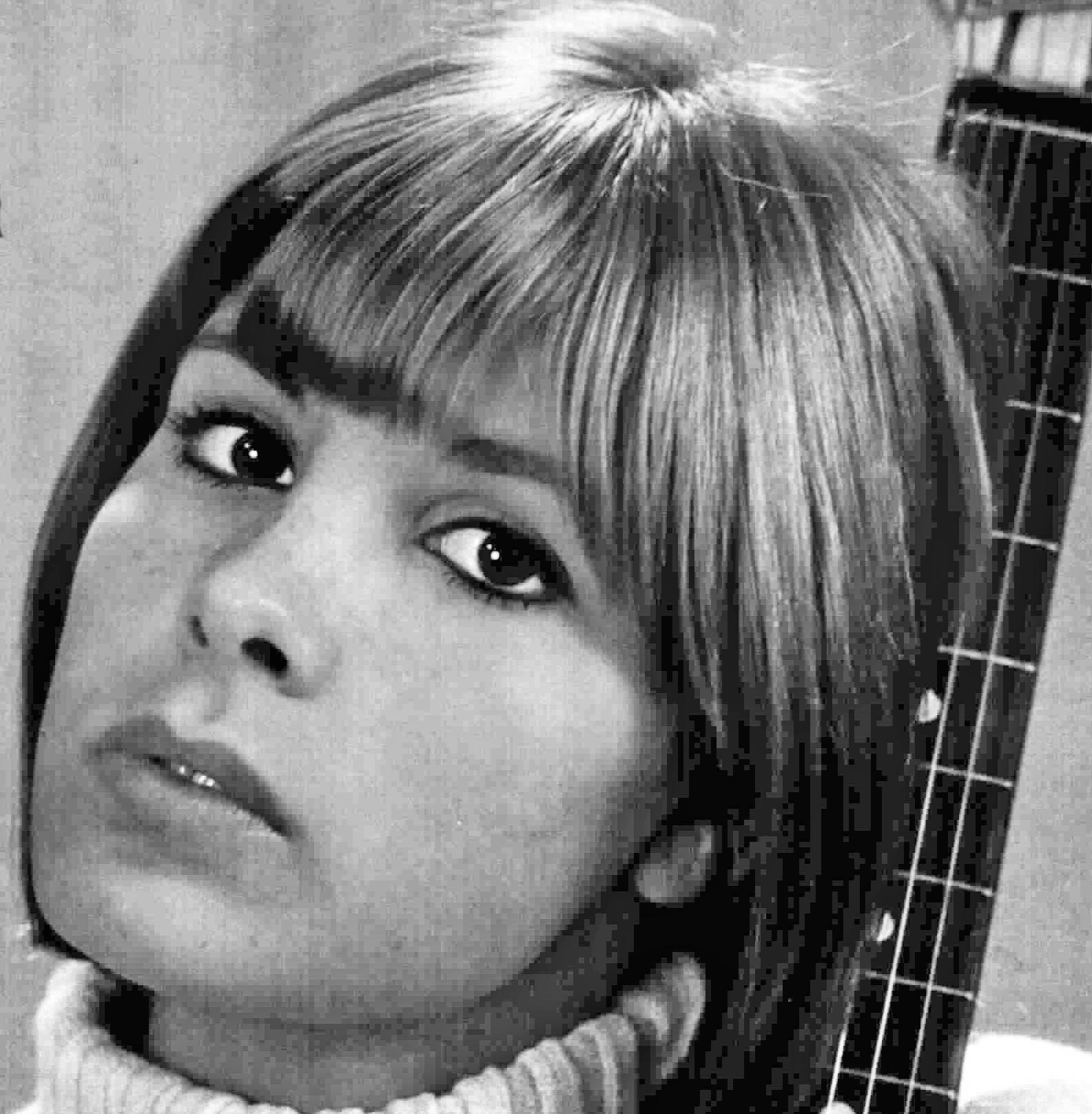
Marisa Sannia

Marisa Sannia (February 15, 1947 in Iglesias – April 14, 2008 in Cagliari) was an Italian singer from Sardinia. She started her career with success in pop music in the sixties. She later became an performer of songs, composer, actress and then finally an artistic researcher. She is primarily noted for being a singer in her native Sardinian language.

== Biography ==
Having been a basketball player with good level in Cus Cagliari (which also called the national), Marisa Sannia began her musical career in the early sixties, winning a competition for new items that allowed her to get a record deal with the Cetra Fonit.

Her talent was spotted by Sergio Endrigo and Luis Enriquez Bacalov that sought to tap into composing a piece for her debut recording "All or nothing" and promoting its participation in 1967, on television as "Scala Reale" and "Settevoci".

The recognition received by the television appearances allowed her to participate the same year two musicarelli: "Kids of yellow flag", "Stasera mi butto", alongside Giancarlo Giannini.

After a few small successes (A postcard, Be proud of me - award of record criticism), and participation in Festivalbar 1967 where she ranked in the third round for young artists, Sannia achieved wide popularity in 1968 when she finished second in the Sanremo Music Festival with the song "Casa Bianca", written by Don Backy and sung along with Ornella Vanoni, who became a great success, so as to be inserted in the soundtrack of the film "Alfredo Alfredo", by Pietro Germi.

After the success Sanremo, Sannia published her first album. Followed by several successful songs: "A tear", "the company" (composed by Carlo Donida and Mogol and resumed in 1976 by Lucio Battisti and then in 2007 by Vasco Rossi), "Love is a dove", "How sweet the evening tonight" and "my land".

Sannia also worked in film and participated in various events such as singing Canzonissima (1972, inter alia with a song by Nino Tristan, "A Kite"), the International Festival of Light Music of Venice, A Song for Europe in Switzerland and again in 1970 in San Remo in 1971 and 1984.

In the early seventies she devoted herself to theater by participating in two musicals (Cain and Abel and stories suburbs) very successful alongside Tony Cucchiara and in some work directed by Giorgio Albertazzi. Still under the wing of Sergio Endrigo, she also participated in the album The Ark, a collection of songs by Vinicius de Moraes dedicated to children. In 1973 she published a disc with songs taken from the Walt Disney movie entitled Sannia Wonderland.

In 1976 her first songwriting collection was published with the interesting title "The pasta sheet".

In the early eighties Sannia also appeared in television drama "George Sand" with Albertazzi, Anna Proclemer and Paola Borboni and participated in the film by Pupi Avati "Help me to dream". In 1984 she returned to Sanremo with "love Love" that followed a long period of isolation from the scene.

In 1993 she returned with a disc in the Sardinian language in which the verses of music Antioco Casula, Sardinian poet active in the first half of the twentieth century, entitled Sa oghe de su Entu e de su mare. Sannia later returned to the theater with Albertazzi in "memories of Adriano" - Portrait of an entry of 1995.

In 1997 recorded the new disc Melagranàda in collaboration with the contemporary poet writer Francesco Masala in a collection from the Poesias in duas limbas. In 2002 she participated in "songs for you", a tribute to Sergio Endrigo, interpreting "Hands holes".

In 2003 she published a third collection in the Sardinian language, and "Nanas and Janas", with new words and music written by herself. This research is poetic and musical recital summarized in "Songs between two languages on the way of poetry" presented in important exhibitions in Italy and abroad as The Night of the Poets all'anfiteatro Nora Roman, at Taormina Film Festival and as part of the exhibition Rome Meets the World . In January 2006 she took part in the concert tribute to Sergio Endrigo, entitled "Hello Poet" and collected in a CD / DVD, which interprets "The White Rose" and "How ever tonight."

Her last work, posthumously published and distributed (Felmay - Egea distributions) in November 2008 (preview Premio Tenco) and Sannia "Rosa de papel" is dedicated to the life and poetry of Federico García Lorca.

She also won the Festival della Canzone d'Autore for Children. Sannia was interested in the work of other artists. And some of her own compositions have been covered also in Spain by the singer Ester Formosa.

Due to a sudden and serious illness Sannia died in Cagliari, aged 61, on April 14, 2008. In August 2008, the "Maria Carta" award was established in her memory. In January 2009, the artist Maria Lai dedicated an exhibition of her works to Sannia.

== Discography ==
- Marisa Sannia (Fonit Cetra, 1968)
- Marisa Sannia canta Sergio Endrigo e le sue canzoni (CGD, 1970)
- Marisa nel paese delle meraviglie (EMI Italiana, 1973)
- La pasta scotta (CBS, 1976)
- Sa oghe de su entu e de su mare (Tekno Record, 1993)
- Melagranàda (Nar, 1997)
- Nanas e janas (Nar, 2003).
- Rosa de papel (Felmay) (2008)

== Filmography ==
- 1967 - I ragazzi di Bandiera Gialla, directed by Mariano Laurenti
- 1967 - Stasera mi butto, directed by Ettore Maria Fizzarotti
