= Mario Tessuto =

Italian singer (1943–2024)

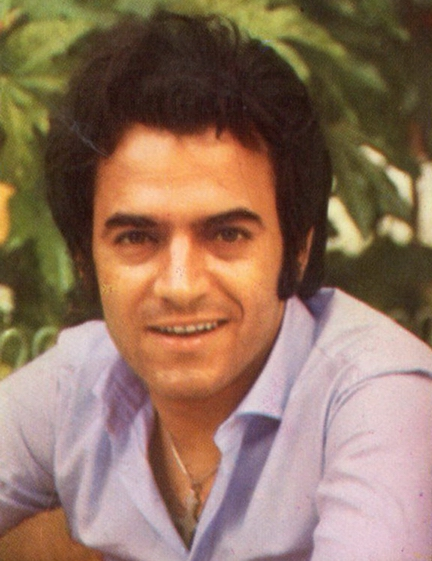
- Tessuto in 1972
- Born: Mario Buongiovanni; 7 September 1943; Pignataro Maggiore, Kingdom of Italy
- Died: 5 December 2024 (aged 81); Vigevano, Italy
- Occupation: Singer

Mario Buongiovanni (7 September 1943 – 5 December 2024), known professionally as Mario Tessuto, was an Italian pop singer, best known for the song "Lisa dagli occhi blu".

== Early life and education ==
Born in Pignataro Maggiore, at young age Tessuto moved with his family to Milan, where he studied accounting and opened a barbershop.

== Career ==
Tessuto started performing live thanks to his friendship with I Camaleonti's guitarist Livio Macchia, and after being noted by Adriano Celentano's collaborator Miki Del Prete, in 1963 he was put under contract by the label Clan Celentano. Dissatisfied with not being able to record any records, he then passed to Ricky Gianco's label Jaguar Records, making his official debut with the single "Non mi lasciare".

In 1966, Tessuto participated in Cantagiro with "Teenagers Concerto"; two years later, he returned to the competition, placing second with a cover version of Michel Polnareff's "Love Me, Please Love Me". In 1969, Tessuto had his commercial breakout with "Lisa dagli occhi blu": the song placed second at Un disco per l'estate, became a huge hit, and was adapted into a musicarello film with the same title, starring the same Tessuto and Silvia Dionisio. In the 1970s, he took part in some of the most important musical events in Italy, including the 20th edition of the Sanremo Music Festival, but failed to repeat the success of his major hit. In the 1980s he formed a duo with his wife Donatella, and started being a recurring guest in nostalgia-themed music TV-shows.

== Death ==
A long-standing heart patient, Tessuto died in Vigevano on 5 December 2024, at the age of 81.
