= Giovani Wannabe =

Single by Pinguini Tattici Nucleari

from the album Fake News
- Released: 27 May 2022
- Genre: Pop rock
- Length: 3:34
- Label: Columbia; Sony Music
- Songwriters: Riccardo Zanotti; Marco Paganelli
- Producers: Riccardo Zanotti; Enrico Brun

Pinguini Tattici Nucleari singles chronology
| "Pastello bianco" (2021) | "Giovani Wannabe" (2022) | "Dentista Croazia" (2022) |

Music video
- "Giovani Wannabe" on YouTube

"Giovani Wannabe" ("Young Wannabes") is a song by Italian band Pinguini Tattici Nucleari. It was released by Sony Music on 27 May 2022 as the first single from the band's fifth studio album Fake News.

The song topped the Italian singles chart and was certified seven times platinum in Italy. It also won the 2023 SIAE Music Award for the best radio song.

== Music video ==
The music video for the song was released on YouTube on 31 May 2022, to accompany the single's release. Directed by Francesco Lorusso, it stars Francesco Mehths Cicconetti and Chiara Pieri.

== Charts ==
=== Weekly charts ===
Weekly chart performance for "Giovani Wannabe"
| Chart (2021) | Peak position |
|---|---|
| Italy (FIMI) | 1 |
| Italy Airplay (EarOne) | 1 |

=== Year-end charts ===
2022 year-end chart performance for "Giovani Wannabe"
| Chart | Position |
|---|---|
| Italy (FIMI) | 7 |

2023 year-end chart performance for "Giovani Wannabe"
| Chart | Position |
|---|---|
| Italy (FIMI) | 48 |

== Certifications ==
| Region | Certification | Certified units/sales |
|---|---|---|
| Italy (FIMI) | 7× Platinum | 700,000^{‡} |
^{‡} Sales+streaming figures based on certification alone.
