= Rhove =

- Born: Samuel Roveda; 1 June 2001 (age 24); Rho, Italy
- Genres: Trap
- Occupation: Rapper
- Years active: 2019–present
- Labels: EMI Italy, Universal,

Rhove, pseudonym of Samuel Roveda (born 1 June 2001) is an Italian rapper.

== Biography ==
Rhove began his musical career in 2019, when he released an EP titled Sei stelle, which was later removed. In December 2020 he released his first single "Blanc Orange (Nanana)". He took inspiration by French rappers such as Jul and SCH.

His consecration occurred in December 2021 when he released the song "Shakerando", which the following spring spent seven consecutive weeks at the top of the Italian Charts, being certified seven times platinum by FIMI for having sold over 700,000 units nationwide and having widespread success on digital music platforms. The popularity of the song led to the entry of four other songs by the rapper in the Italian charts and three gold records for "La zone" (featuring Shiva), "La province #1" and "Cancelo". His participation in various music festivals was also confirmed during the summer of 2022, including Rock in Roma in the Rome, Summer Vibez in Ferrara and Rugby Sound in Legnano. On the following 10th June he released his EP Provinciale.

In March 2023, after months of absence from the music scene, he released the single "Pelé". Popolari, his debut studio album, was released by EMI Italy and Universal Italia in March of the following year.

== Discography ==
=== Studio albums ===
- Popolari (2024)

=== EPs ===
- Provinciale (2022)
