= Pinguini Tattici Nucleari =

Italian band

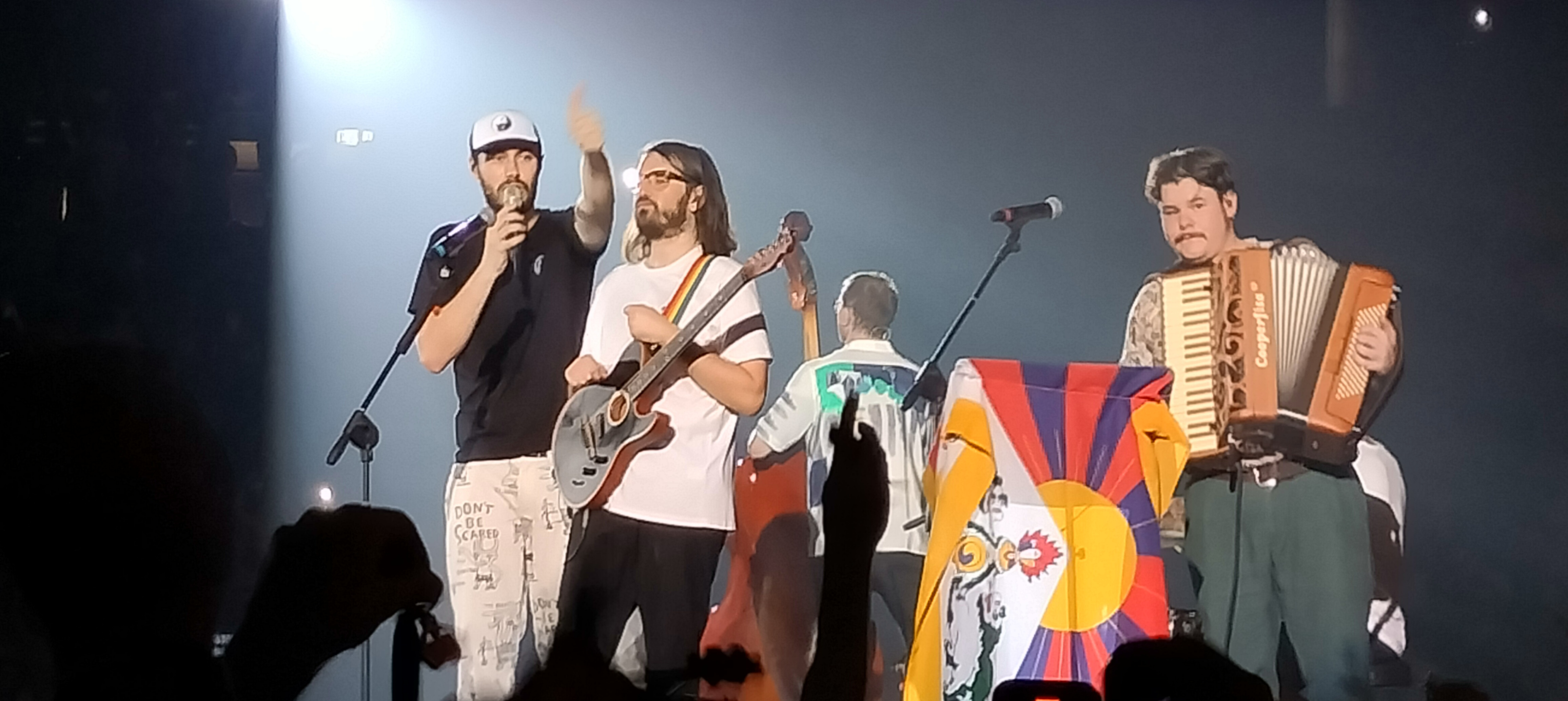
- Pinguini Tattici Nucleari performing in 2022

Background information
- Also known as: PTN
- Origin: Bergamo, Italy
- Years active: 2010–present
- Label: Sony Music (2018–present)
- Members: Riccardo Zanotti; Nicola Buttafuoco; Lorenzo Pasini; Simone Pagani; Matteo Locati; Elio Biffi
- Past members: Francesco Bemuzzi; Claudio Cuter; Cristiano Marchesi; Marco Sonzogni

Pinguini Tattici Nucleari (Italian: [piŋˈɡwiːni ˈtattitʃi nukleˈaːri]; English: "Tactical Nuclear Penguins"), sometimes shortened to PTN, is an Italian indie rock/pop band formed in 2010 in Bergamo.

They debuted in 2012 with the EP Cartoni animali and their first studio album Il re è nudo was released in 2014. The band participated at the Sanremo Music Festival 2020 with the song "Ringo Starr", finishing in 3rd place. Since then, they have achieved numerous successes, earning platinum records and reaching the top of the Italian Singles Chart four times with "Giovani Wannabe", "Ricordi", "Nightmares", and "Islanda".

== History ==
=== 2010–2018: Debut and early recordings ===
The band was formed at the end of 2010 in the province of Bergamo, initially consisting of Riccardo Zanotti (drums), Lorenzo Pasini (guitar), Francesco Bernuzzi (vocals), Claudio Cuter (guitar) and Cristiano Marchesi (bass). According to members of the band, their name is inspired by Tactical Nuclear Penguin, a beer produced by Scottish brewery BrewDog in 2009.

Their first EP Cartoni animali, was self-released in 2012. In 2014, Bemuzzi left the group, and Marco Sonzogni joined as drummer. At this point, Zanotti moved to become the groups vocalist and frontman. Their debut studio album, Il re è nudo (The King Is Naked) was released in 2014.

At the end of 2015, Elio Biffi joined on keyboard and accordion, and Matteo Locati took over from Sonzogni as drummer who left at the start of 2016. With this line-up, the band released their second album Diamo un calcio all'aldilà (Let's Kick the Afterlife) on 18 December 2015.

In 2016, the band arrived at their current formation with Nicola Buttafuoco joining on guitar, and Simone Pagani on bass, and the departure of Cuter and Marchesi. In April 2017, the group released their third album Gioventù brucata.

=== 2019–2021: Fuori dall'hype, Sanremo Festival and commercial success ===
It was announced in January 2019 that the group had signed to Sony Music, and their first album with the label, Fuori dall'hype was released on 5 April 2019. The singles "Verdura" and "Irene" were both certified Gold by FIMI in September 2020.

In February 2020 the group took part in Sanremo Music Festival 2020 with the song "Ringo Starr". During the third night of the festival, which is dedicated to covers, they performed a medley of songs entitled "Settanta volte". The songs included in the medley were: "Papaveri e papere", "Nessuno mi può giudicare", "Gianna", "Sarà perché ti amo", "Una musica può fare", "Salirò", "Sono solo parole", and "Rolls Royce". They placed third overall in the contest. The album Fuori dall'hype was certified gold in February 2020, and has since been certified 5 times platinum.

On 28 August 2020, they released the single "La storia infinita". It was followed by the single "Scooby Doo" on 13 November 2020, and by the EP Ahia! on 4 December. In March 2021, they returned to the Sanremo Music Festival to accompany Bugo during the covers night, performing the song "Un'avventura" by Lucio Battisti. Over the course of 2021, they released collaborations with several artists, including "Ferma a guardare" with Ernia and "Babaganoush" with Madame.

=== 2022–2023: Fake News ===
On 27 May 2022, after the announcement that they were working on a new album, the band released the single "Giovani Wannabe". On 19 August the single "Dentista Croazia", a song which recalls the bands beginnings, was released. This was followed by the single "Ricordi" on 23 September, which became the most played song on Italian radio after its release.

On 13 November 2022, the band won the MTV Europe Music Award for Best Italian Act at the 2022 MTV Europe Music Awards.

On 2 December 2022, they released their fifth studio album, Fake News. They celebrated the release of the album with a dedicated exhibition in Milan. After the album's release, the singles "Coca zero" and "Rubami la notte" followed on 31 March 2023 and 19 May 2023 respectively.

According to Spotify, Pinguini Tattici Nucleari were the eighth most listened to artist in Italy in 2023.

=== 2024–present: Hello World ===
On 13 September 2024, they released the single "Romantico ma muori". On 15 November 2024, they released the single "Islanda". These two singles were included in the album Hello World, which was released on 6 December 2024. In just one week, the album was certified gold by FIMI.

On 11 April 2025, they released a new single, a remix of "Bottiglie vuote", in collaboration with Max Pezzali. The band embarked on their "Hello World Tour" in stadiums and arenas, in June and July 2025. On 26 September 2025, "Amaro" was released as the fourth single from Hello World.

== Discography ==
=== Studio albums ===
Title	Details	Peak chart positions	Certifications
Title	Details	ITA	Certifications
Il re è nudo	Released: 2014; Format: Digital download, CD; Label: RCA Records, Sony Music Italy	—	
Diamo un calcio all'Aldilà	Released: 18 December 2015; Format: Digital download, CD; Label: RCA Records, Sony Music Italy	—	
Gioventù brucata	Released: 17 April 2017; Format: Digital download, CD; Label: RCA Records, Sony Music Italy	—	FIMI: Gold
Fuori dall'hype	Released: 5 April 2019; Format: Digital download, CD; Label: Sony Music Italy	2	FIMI: 6× Platinum
Fake News	Released: 2 December 2022; Format: Digital download, CD; Label: Sony Music Italy	1	FIMI: 6× Platinum
Hello World	Released: 6 December 2024; Format: Digital download, CD, LP; Label: Sony Music Italy	1	FIMI: 4× Platinum

=== Extended plays ===
Title	Details	Peak chart positions	Certifications
Title	Details	ITA	Certifications
Cartoni animali	Released: 2012; Format: Digital download; Label: Self-released	―	
Ahia!	Released: 4 December 2020; Format: Digital download, CD, LP, Cassette; Label: Sony Music Italy	2	FIMI: 6× Platinum

=== Singles ===
==== As lead artist ====
Title	Year	Peak chart positions	Certifications	Album
Title	Year	ITA	Certifications	Album
"Irene"	2018	—	FIMI: Platinum	Gioventù brucata
"Verdura"	2019	98	FIMI: Platinum	Fuori dall'hype
"Sashimi"	2019	—		Fuori dall'hype
"Fuori dall'hype"	2019	—	FIMI: Gold	Fuori dall'hype
"Ringo Starr"	2020	3	FIMI: 4× Platinum	Fuori dall'hype - Ringo Starr
"Ridere"	2020	28	FIMI: 6× Platinum	Fuori dall'hype - Ringo Starr
"La storia infinita"	2020	14	FIMI: 3× Platinum	Ahia!
"Scooby Doo"	2020	2	FIMI: 4× Platinum	Ahia!
"Scrivile scemo"	2021	11	FIMI: 5× Platinum	Ahia!
"Pastello bianco"	2021	2	FIMI: 8× Platinum	Ahia!
"Giovani Wannabe"	2022	1	FIMI: 7× Platinum	Fake News
"Dentista Croazia"	2022	40	FIMI: Gold	Fake News
"Ricordi"	2022	1	FIMI: 5× Platinum	Fake News
"Coca zero"	2023	20	FIMI: 2× Platinum	Fake News
"Rubami la notte"	2023	5	FIMI: 4× Platinum	Fake News
"Nightmares" (with Bresh)	2023	1	FIMI: 2× Platinum	Non-album single
"Romantico ma muori"	2024	3	FIMI: Platinum	Hello World
"Islanda"	2024	1	FIMI: 2× Platinum	Hello World
"Bottiglie vuote" (featuring Max Pezzali)	2025	4	FIMI: 2× Platinum	Hello World
"Amaro"	2025	11	FIMI: Platinum	Hello World
"Sorry scusa lo siento"	2026	4	FIMI: Gold	Replay
"Nella borsa di Anna"	2026	2		Replay

==== As featured artist ====
Title	Year	Peak chart positions	Certifications	Album
Title	Year	ITA	Certifications	Album
"Una canzone come gli 883" (DPCM Squad) (Note: Ensemble formed by Max Pezzali, Lo Stato Sociale, Cimini, Emis Killa, Eugenio in Via Di Gioia, Fast Animals and Slow Kids, Marco Giallini, J-Ax, Jake La Furia, La Pina, Pierluigi Pardo, Pinguini Tattici Nucleari and Nicola Savino.)	2020	—		Non-album single
"Ferma a guardare" (Ernia featuring Pinguini Tattici Nucleari)	2021	3	FIMI: 5× Platinum	Gemelli

=== Other charted songs ===
Title	Year	Peak chart positions	Certifications	Album
Title	Year	ITA	Certifications	Album
"Bergamo"	2020	97	FIMI: Gold	Fuori dall'hype - Ringo Starr
"Bohémien"	2020	38	FIMI: Gold	Ahia!
"Giulia"	2020	47	FIMI: Platinum	Ahia!
"Ahia!"	2020	61		Ahia!
"Zen"	2022	22	FIMI: Platinum	Fake News
"L'ultima volta"	2022	35	FIMI: Gold	Fake News
"Hold On"	2022	31	FIMI: Platinum	Fake News
"Stage Diving"	2022	45		Fake News
"Melting Pop"	2022	79		Fake News
"Fede"	2022	62		Fake News
"Hikikomori"	2022	29	FIMI: Platinum	Fake News
"Barfly"	2022	80		Fake News
"Per non sentire la fine del mondo"	2024	41		Hello World
"Burnout"	2024	31		Hello World
"Nevica"	2024	44		Hello World
"Your Dog"	2024	40		Hello World
"Migliore"	2024	25		Hello World

=== Guest appearances ===
Title	Year	Peak chart positions	Certifications	Album
Title	Year	ITA	Certifications	Album
"Meglio" (Bugo featuring Pinguini Tattici Nucleari)	2021	—		Bugatti Christian
"Babaganoush" (Madame featuring Pinguini Tattici Nucleari)	2021	21	FIMI: Gold	Madame
"Puoi" (Fulminacci featuring Pinguini Tattici Nucleari)	2023	56		Infinito +1
