= Ricordi (Pinguini Tattici Nucleari song) =

Single by Pinguini Tattici Nucleari

from the album Fake News
- Released: 23 September 2022
- Length: 3:22
- Label: Columbia; Sony Music
- Songwriters: Riccardo Zanotti; Enrico Brun; Giorgio Pesenti
- Producers: Riccardo Zanotti; Enrico Brun; Okgiorgio

Pinguini Tattici Nucleari singles chronology
"Dentista Croazia" (2022)	"Ricordi" (2022)	"Coca zero" (2023)

Music video
- "Ricordi" on YouTube

"Ricordi" (transl. Memories) is a song by Italian band Pinguini Tattici Nucleari. It was released by Sony Music on 23 September 2022 as the third single from the band's fifth studio album Fake News.

The song topped the Italian singles chart and was certified quintuple platinum in Italy.

== Music video ==
The music video for the song was released on YouTube on 21 October 2022, to accompany the single's release. Directed by Lorenzo Silvestri and Andrea Santaterra, it stars actors Sergio Rubini and Eleonora Ivone.

== Charts ==
=== Weekly charts ===
Weekly chart performance for "Ricordi"
Chart (2022)	Peak position
Italy (FIMI)	1
Italy Airplay (EarOne)	1

=== Year-end charts ===
2022 year-end chart performance for "Ricordi"
Chart	Position
Italy (FIMI)	39

2023 year-end chart performance for "Ricordi"
Chart	Position
Italy (FIMI)	34

== Certifications ==
Certifications for "Ricordi"
Region	Certification	Certified units/sales
Italy (FIMI)	5× Platinum	500,000^{‡}
^{‡} Sales+streaming figures based on certification alone.
