= Perdono (Caterina Caselli song) =

Single by Caterina Caselli

from the album Casco d'oro
- B-side: "L'uomo d'oro"
- Released: 1966
- Genre: Pop
- Length: 2:55
- Label: CGD
- Songwriter(s): Piero Soffici, Mogol

Caterina Caselli singles chronology
"Nessuno mi può giudicare" (1966)	"Perdono" (1966)	"Cento giorni" (1966)

"Perdono" (Italian pronunciation: [perˈdoːno], i.e. "Forgive me") is an Italian pop song written by Piero Soffici and Mogol and performed by Caterina Caselli.

The song was released as a "double A-side" together with "L'uomo d'oro". It was launched on the occasion of the third edition of the Festivalbar, and it won the competition as the most listened song in Italian jukeboxes with over 72,000 hits in the 1966 Summer. "L'uomo d'oro" entered the competition Un disco per l'estate eventually finishing fifth.

The same year, “Perdono” was adapted into a musicarello, film with the same name, directed by Ettore Maria Fizzarotti and starring Laura Efrikian and the same Caterina Caselli.

== Track listing ==
- 7" single – N 9612

"L'uomo d'oro" (Daniele Pace, Alceo Guatelli, Mario Panzeri) – 2:31
"Perdono" (Piero Soffici, Mogol) – 2:55

== Charts ==
Chart (1966)	Peak position
Italy	3
