= Gino Bramieri =

Italian comedian and actor (1928–1996)

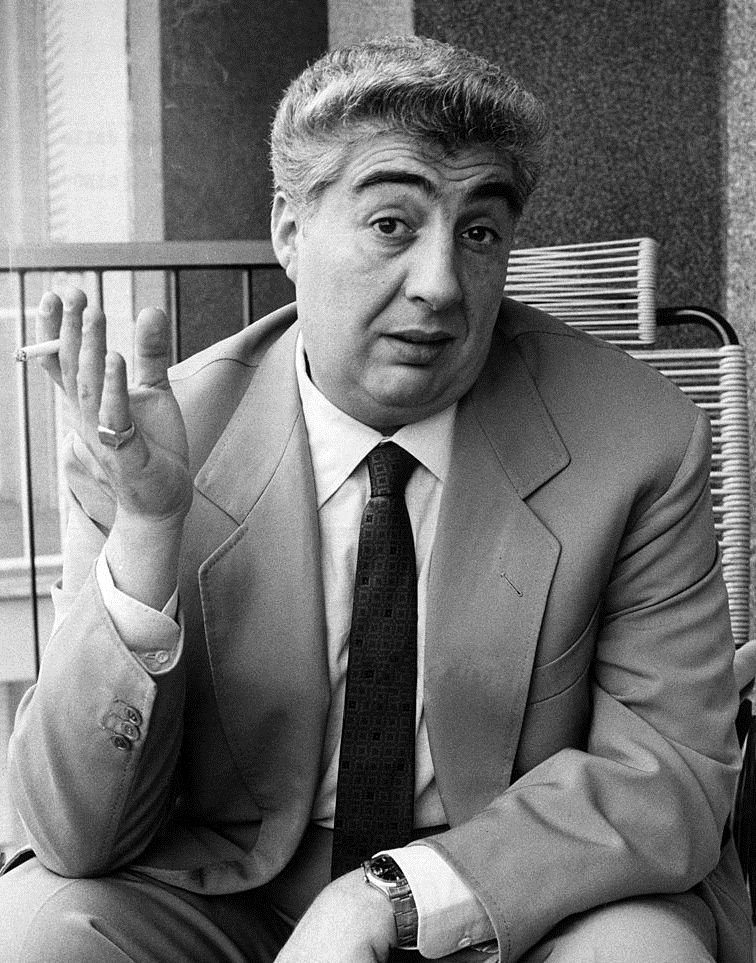
- Gino Bramieri in 1966
- Born: Luigi Bramieri; 21 June 1928; Milan, Kingdom of Italy
- Died: 18 June 1996 (aged 67); Milan, Italy
- Occupations: Actor; comedian
- Height: 1.68 m (5 ft 6 in)
- Spouses: Maria Barbieri; Ida Petruccetti; Angela Baldassini
- Children: Cesare Bramieri

Luigi "Gino" Bramieri (Italian pronunciation: [ˈdʒiːno braˈmjɛːri]; 21 June 1928 – 18 June 1996) was an Italian comedian and actor. He was especially known as a television comedian, performing in theatres, on radio, and in about thirty movies. He was nicknamed "Il Re della barzelletta" ("the King of jokes") for his burlesque comic style, which was largely based on his skill at telling funny stories. His jokes were sometimes as quick as a cut and thrust, bordering on surrealism. They have been collected in a series of books, such as 50 chili fa ("50 kilos ago", a collection he published after dieting).

== Biography ==
Bramieri was born in Milan, Italy, into a humble family. He made his stage debut in 1943 with the prose company in prose by Egisto Olivieri. He later graduated in accountancy at night school. In 1948, he got married and had a son. Bramieri's career was launched by Erminio Macario, who entered him into his revue company in 1949. In his career, he has performed together with many prominent Italian comedians and actors, including Franco and Ciccio, Peppino De Filippo, Aldo Fabrizi, Ave Ninchi, Nino Taranto, Raimondo Vianello, Renato Rascel, and Totò. His career in television reached its apex in the 1960s–1970s, with RAI television shows such as Tigre contro tigre, Il signore ha suonato?, E noi qui and others; in the 1980s, he conducted a show named after him, the Gino Bramieri show (aka G.B. Show).

He died of cancer at the age of 67 and was buried in Milan's Cimitero Monumentale.

A street in Milan (district of Porta Nuova), and an avenue in Rome (in the Pineto city park) have been renamed in his honour.

== Filmography ==
- Siamo tutti Milanesi, directed by Mario Landi (1953)
- Loving You Is My Sin, directed by Sergio Grieco (1953)
- The Three Thieves, directed by Lionello De Felice (1955)
- Avanzi di galera, directed by Vittorio Cottafavi (1955)
- Per le vie della città, directed by Luigi Giachino (1956)
- Peppino, le modelle e chella là, directed by Mario Mattoli (1957)
- Scandali al mare, directed by Marino Girolami (1961)
- Hercules in the Valley of Woe, directed by Mario Mattoli (1961)
- Twist, lolite e vitelloni, directed by Marino Girolami (1962)
- Nerone '71, directed by Filippo Walter Ratti (1962)
- L'assassino si chiama Pompeo, directed by Marino Girolami (1962)
- Il medico delle donne, directed by Marino Girolami (1962)
- Gli eroi del doppio gioco, directed by Camillo Mastrocinque (1962)
- Canzoni a tempo di twist, directed by Stefano Canzio (1962)
- Colpo gobbo all'italiana (1962) as Panza, directed by Lucio Fulci
- I tre nemici, directed by Giorgio Simonelli (1962)
- Gli italiani e le donne, directed by Marino Girolami (1962)
- Un marito in condominio, directed by Angelo Dorigo (1963)
- Siamo tutti pomicioni, directed by Marino Girolami (1963)
- I quattro tassisti, directed by Giorgio Bianchi (1963)
- Adultero lui, adultera lei, directed by Raffaello Matarazzo (1963)
- * In ginocchio da te, directed by Ettore Maria Fizzarotti (1964)
- Se non avessi più te, directed by Ettore Maria Fizzarotti (1965)
- Non son degno di te, directed by Ettore Maria Fizzarotti (1965)
- Rita the Mosquito, directed by Lina Wertmüller (1966)
- Perdono, directed by Ettore Maria Fizzarotti (1966)
- Nessuno mi può giudicare, directed by Ettore Maria Fizzarotti (1966)
- Chimera, directed by Ettore Maria Fizzarotti (1968)
- Nel giorno del Signore, directed by Bruno Corbucci (1970)
- W le donne, directed by Aldo Grimaldi (1970)
- Per amore di Cesarina, directed by Vittorio Sindoni (1976)
- Oh! Serafina, directed by Alberto Lattuada (1976)
- Ride bene... chi ride ultimo directed by Bramieri
- Maschio latino cercasi, directed by Giovanni Narzisi (1977)
- Ridendo e scherzando, directed by Marco Aleandri (1978)

=== Television ===
==== Plays ====
- Esami di maturità of Ladislao Fodor, directed by Mario Landi (1954)
- Manettoni e Pippo Fantasma, directed by Alda Grimaldi (1960)
- Biblioteca di Studio Uno: Il dottor Jekyll e mister Hyde, directed by Antonello Falqui (1964)
- Biblioteca di Studio Uno: Al Grand Hotel, directed by Antonello Falqui (1964)
- Graditi ospiti, directed by Vito Molinari (1967)
- Felicita Colombo, directed by Antonello Falqui (1968)
- Mai di sabato signora Lisistrata, directed by Vito Molinari (1971)
- Un mandarino per Teo, directed by Eros Macchi (1974)
- Anche i bancari hanno un'anima, directed by Pietro Garinei and Gino Landi (1979)
- La vita comincia ogni mattina, directed by Pietro Garinei (1981)

==== Sitcom ====
- Nonno Felice, directed by Giancarlo Nicotra (1992-1995)
- Norma e Felice, directed by Giancarlo Nicotra and Beppe Recchia (1995)

== Gallery ==
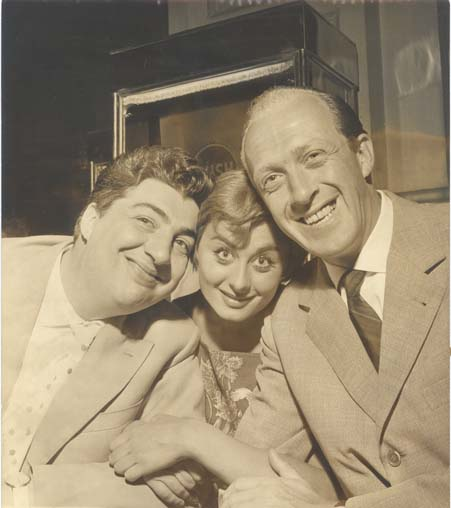
Gino Bramieri in 1958, with Sandra Mondaini and Raimondo Vianello

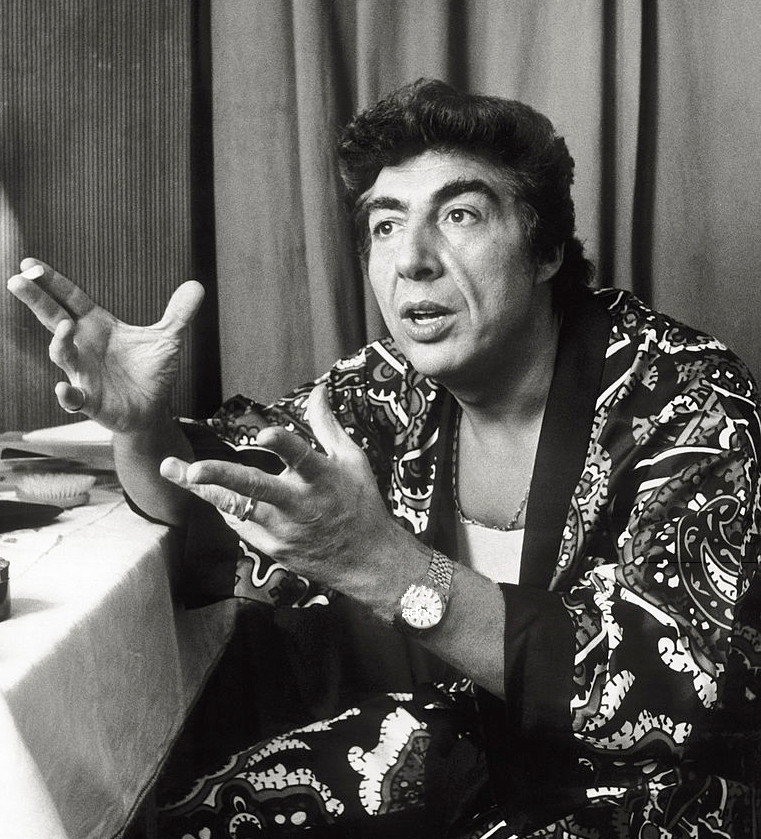
Gino Bramieri in 1971

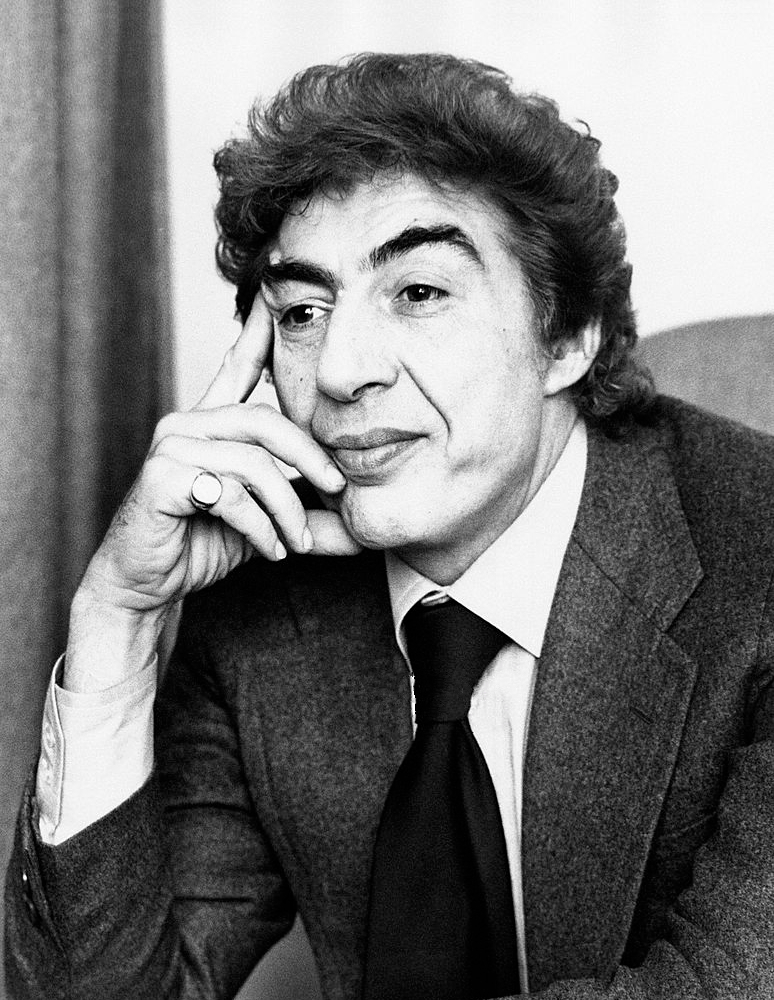
Gino Bramieri in 1975

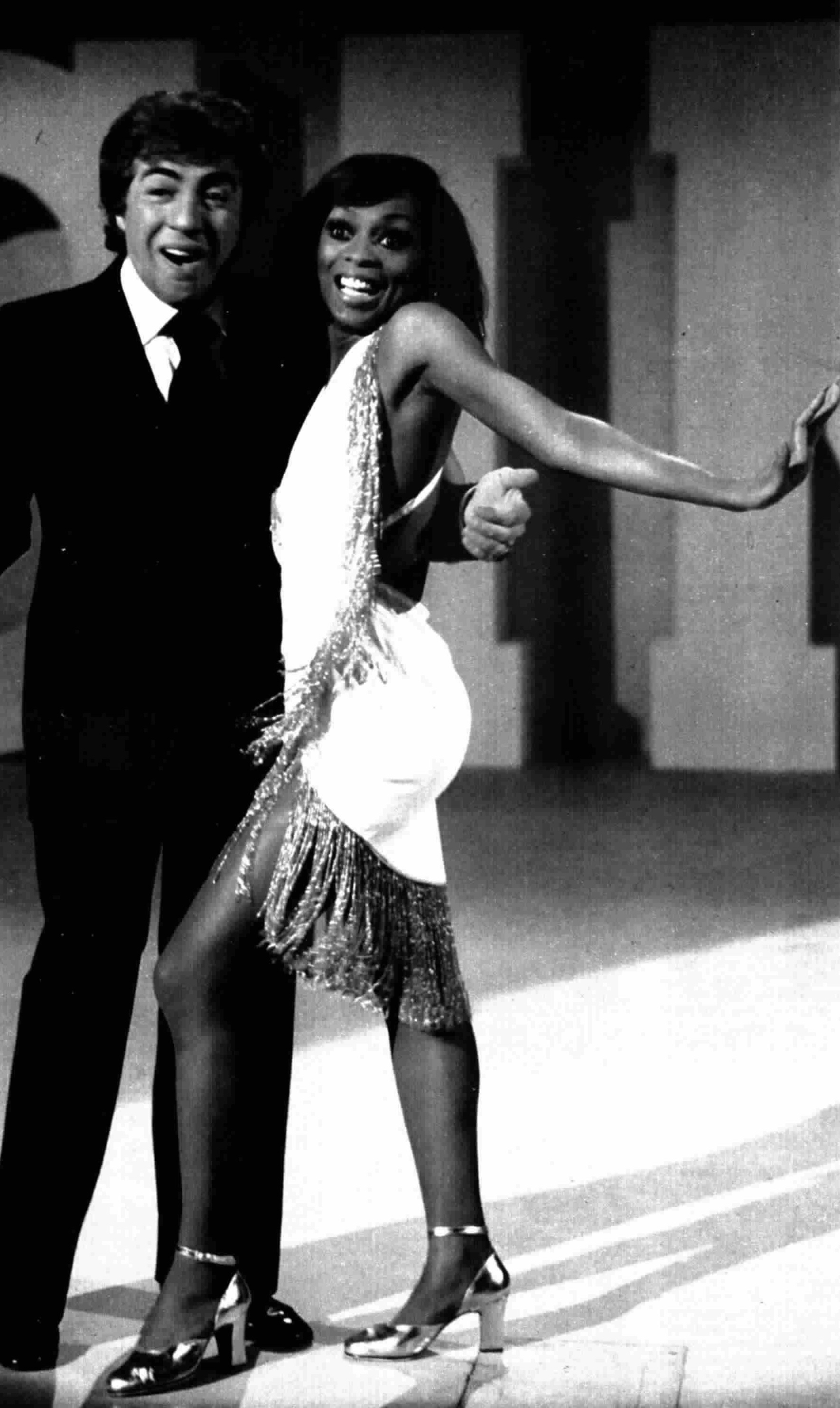
Bramieri and Lola Falana during the show Hai visto mai?
