= Perdono (film) =

- Directed by: Ettore Maria Fizzarotti
- Written by: Giovanni Grimaldi
- Story by: Sergio Bonotti
- Starring: Caterina Caselli; Fabrizio Moroni; Nino Taranto; Paolo Panelli; Gino Bramieri; Marisa Del Frate; Laura Efrikian
- Cinematography: Mario Capriotti
- Music by: Gianfranco Monaldi
- Distributed by: Titanus
- Release date: 1966
- Country: Italy
- Language: Italian

Perdono (Italian pronunciation: [perˈdoːno], i.e. "Forgive Me") is a 1966 Italian musical film directed by Ettore Maria Fizzarotti. It is named after the Caterina Caselli's hit song "Perdono". It is the sequel to Nessuno mi può giudicare.

== Plot ==
Federico, his girlfriend Laura and her cousin, Caterina, are three young people full of hope, united by a great friendship that seems indissoluble. The three work in a department store but, when Caterina decides to attempt a musical career, given her vocal skills, everything changes. Caterina becomes a successful singer and Federico falls in love with her. Caterina, who however does not want to make her cousin Laura suffer, pretends not to reciprocate the young man by making him put his head in order. Meanwhile, the plots of various secondary characters evolve, in particular the fresh marriage between the security guard Antonio and the secretary of the department stores Adelina.

The film ends with Caterina singing the song Perdono at a show.

== Cast ==
- Laura Efrikian as Laura
- Fabrizio Moroni as Federico
- Caterina Caselli as Caterina
- Clelia Matania as Adelina
- Nino Taranto as Antonio
- Gino Bramieri as Director
- Paolo Panelli as Paolo
- Carlo Croccolo as Gennarino
- Vittorio Congia as Vittorio
- Marisa Del Frate as Paola
- Gabriele Antonini as Mario
- Dolores Palumbo as Laura's Mother
- Enrico Viarisio as Enrico
- Carlo Delle Piane as Carlo
- Carlo Taranto as Peppiniello
- Mirella Pompili as Mirella
- Milena Vukotic as The English Teacher
- Nino Terzo as Nino
