= Mezzanotte d'amore =

- Directed by: Ettore Maria Fizzarotti
- Screenplay by: Giovanni Grimaldi
- Story by: Ettore Maria Fizzarotti
- Starring: Romina Power; Al Bano; Walter Brugiolo; Paolo Panelli; Bice Valori; Nino Taranto
- Cinematography: Fausto Zuccoli
- Edited by: Daniele Alabiso
- Music by: Luigi Malatesta
- Release date: 1970
- Country: Italy
- Language: Italian

Mezzanotte d'amore (Italian for Midnight of love) is a 1970 Italian musicarello romantic comedy film directed by Ettore Maria Fizzarotti and starring Al Bano and Romina Power. It is the sequel of Il suo nome è Donna Rosa.

== Cast ==
- Romina Power as Rosetta Belmonte
- Al Bano as Andrea
- Dolores Palumbo as Maria, Andrea's Mother
- Stelvio Rosi as Giorgio De Barberis
- Nino Terzo as Gaetano
- Enzo Cannavale as Gennarino
- Carlo Taranto as Francesco
- Nino Vingelli as Ferdinando
- Lino Banfi as The Revenue Officer
- Ignazio Balsamo as The Carabiniere
- Walter Brugiolo: as Pietro
- Nino Taranto as Antonio Belmonte
- Bice Valori as Rosa De Barberis
- Paolo Panelli as Paolo De Barberis
- Nicoletta Elmi as Rosy
