= Nessuno mi può giudicare (song) =

Single by Caterina Caselli

from the album Casco d'oro
- B-side: "Se lo dici tu"
- Released: 1966
- Genre: Pop
- Length: 2:41
- Label: CGD
- Songwriters: Luciano Beretta; Miki Del Prete; Daniele Pace; Mario Panzeri

Caterina Caselli singles chronology
"Sono qui con voi" (1965)	"Nessuno mi può giudicare" (1966)	"L'uomo d'oro/Perdono" (1966)

"Nessuno mi può giudicare" (Italian pronunciation: [nesˈsuːno mi ˈpwɔ ddʒudiˈkaːre]; "Nobody can judge me") is an Italian pop song written by Luciano Beretta, Miki Del Prete, Daniele Pace and Mario Panzeri. The song premiered at the sixteenth edition of the Sanremo Music Festival, and was performed by Caterina Caselli and Gene Pitney, finishing second.

Caselli's version was a massive success, in spite of her being almost unknown at the time, and peaked at the first place on the Italian hit parade for several weeks. It is considered as the song which consecrated Caselli to fame. Caselli also recorded a French-language ("Baisse un peu la radio") and a Spanish-language version ("Ninguno me puede juzgar") of the song. Gene Pitney's version peaked at the eight place on the Italian charts. It became a regional hit in the US and Australia in areas with large Italian communities.

The lyrics are about the confession of a betrayal and an unapologetic proposal of reconciliation. They were seen as an anticipation of the moral revolution and feminist themes which exploded a few years later.

The song had been previously intended to be performed by Adriano Celentano, who also recorded a demo but eventually preferred to compete in the festival with his own song "Il ragazzo della via Gluck".

The song was adapted into a musicarello film with the same name, directed by Ettore Maria Fizzarotti and starring Laura Efrikian and Caterina Caselli herself.

The song used as the main theme for the Greek black comedy TV series Ti Psyhi Tha Paradoseis Mori? by Mega Channel during the season 2000–2001.

== Track listing ==
- 7" single – AN 4155

A. "Nessuno mi può giudicare" (Luciano Beretta, Miki Del Prete, Daniele Pace, Mario Panzeri) – 2:38
B. "Se lo dici tu" (Saro Leva, Gian Piero Reverberi) – 2:41

== Charts ==
Chart (1966)	Peak position
Argentina	1
Italy	1
Spain	1
