= Se non avessi più te (film) =

- Directed by: Ettore Maria Fizzarotti
- Written by: Bruno Corbucci; Giovanni Grimaldi
- Starring: Gianni Morandi; Laura Efrikian
- Cinematography: Stelvio Massi
- Edited by: Franco Fraticelli
- Music by: Ennio Morricone
- Release date: 1965
- Country: Italy
- Language: Italian

Se non avessi più te is a 1965 Italian musicarello romantic comedy film directed by Ettore Maria Fizzarotti.

== Cast ==
- Gianni Morandi as Gianni Traimonti
- Laura Efrikian as Carla Todisco
- Anna Maria Polani as Isabel de Villalba
- Nino Taranto as Ten. Antonio Todisco
- Gino Bramieri as Gino Traimonti
- Dolores Palumbo as Santina Todisco
- Raffaele Pisu as Raffaele Traimonti
- Enrico Viarisio as The Colonel
- Aroldo Tieri as Neris
- Vittorio Congia as Nando Tazza
- Stelvio Rosi as Giorgio
- Nino Terzo as La Bennola
- Dino Mele as Ciccio
- Carlo Taranto as Sgt. Scannapieco
- Daniele Vargas as Hotel Manager in Barcelona
