= Stelvio Rosi =

Italian film actor (1938–2018)

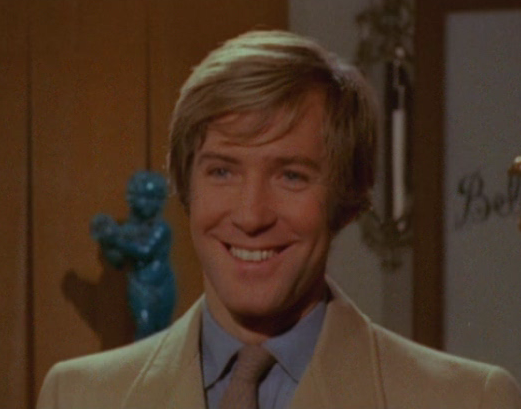
- Stelvio Rosi in Mezzanotte d'amore (1970)
- Born: 1 August 1938; Rome, Italy
- Died: 19 December 2018 (aged 80)
- Other name: Stan Cooper
- Occupation: Actor

Stelvio Rosi (1 August 1938 – 19 December 2018), also known as Stan Cooper, was an Italian film actor.

== Life and career ==
Born in Rome, Rosi made his film debut as a child actor in 1942, in Ferdinando Maria Poggioli's Yes, Madam. He reprised his acting career in the early 1960s and was initially used almost exclusively in teen comedies and musicarelli films. In 1968 he changed his image and his name and as Stan Cooper he was cast in the leading roles in a number of genre films, often adventure or war films. He worked several times with director José Luis Merino. In 1973 he retired from his acting career and moved to South America, where among other things he worked as a film and video producer in Rio de Janeiro.

== Filmography ==
Year	Title	Role	Notes
1942	Sissignora		
1961	Gli attendenti		
1962	Crazy Desire	Il Biondo	
1962	Eighteen in the Sun	George	
1963	The Leopard		
1963	The Shortest Day	Soldato austriaco	Uncredited
1963	Maskenball bei Scotland Yard - Die Geschichte einer unglaublichen Erfindung	Giorgio Bonetti	
1963	Gli onorevoli	Michele, Il biondino	
1964	Full Hearts and Empty Pockets	Gianni	
1964	What Ever Happened to Baby Toto?	Blond boy pipe smoking	
1964	In ginocchio da te	Giorgio Di Bassano	
1964	Canzoni, bulli e pupe	Giorgio Bonetti	
1965	Soldati e caporali	Gino Zangheri	
1965	La violenza e l'amore		(segment "L'amore")
1965	Non son degno di te	Giorgio Di Bassano	
1965	Se non avessi più te	Giorgio	
1966	Sex Quartet	Minor Role	(segment "Fata Elena"), Uncredited
1967	'Stasera mi butto	Fabrizio	
1968	Colpo sensazionale al servizio del Sifar	Lt. Robert Rava	
1969	Battle of the Last Panzer	Lt. Hunter	
1969	Hell Commandos	Sgt. Arthur Nolan	
1969	Il suo nome è Donna Rosa	Giorgio De Barberis	
1969	The Conspirators	Ufficiale delle guardie	Uncredited
1969	Zum zum zum n° 2	Gianni	
1969	Pensiero d'amore	Curd	
1969	Lisa dagli occhi blu	Luca Castellotti	
1969	Strada senza uscita	Amico di Sergio	
1970	Paths of War	Martin / Morgan	
1970	Mezzanotte d'amore	Giorgio	
1970	More Dollars for the MacGregors	Ross Steward	
1971	Something Creeping in The Dark	Dr. Williams	
1971	Venga a fare il soldato da noi	Ambrogio Martinelli	
1972	Monta in sella!! Figlio di...	Sam Madison	
1972	Sei iellato, amico hai incontrato Sacramento	Hike	
1972	La rebelión de los bucaneros	Capitano Mallory	
1972	Go Away! Trinity Has Arrived in Eldorado	Carter	
1973	Da Scaramouche or se vuoi l'assoluzione baciar devi sto... cordone!	Scaramouche	
1973	Li chiamavano i tre moschettieri... invece erano quattro	Aramis	
1973	The Hanging Woman	Serge Chekov	
1975	Quando as Mulheres Querem Provas	Stefano	
1975	Costinha o Rei da Selva		
1975	O Estranho Vicio do Dr. Cornélio		
1975	O Homem da Cabeça de Ouro		
1975	Amantes, Amanhã Se Houver Sol		(final film role)
