= Nessuno mi può giudicare =

Nessuno mi può giudicare may refer to:

- "Nessuno mi può giudicare" (song), a 1966 song by Caterina Caselli
- Nessuno mi può giudicare (1966 film), a musicarello film starring Laura Efrikian
- Nessuno mi può giudicare (2011 film) or Escort in Love, a comedy film starring Paola Cortellesi and Raoul Bova
