= Soldati e caporali =

- Directed by: Mario Amendola
- Written by: Mario Amendola, Franco Castellano
- Edited by: Maurizio Lucidi
- Music by: Lallo Gori
- Release date: 1965
- Running time: 95 minutes
- Country: Italy
- Language: Italian

Soldati e caporali (translation: Soldiers and Corporals) is a 1965 Italian "musicarello" comedy military film directed by Mario Amendola starring the comic duo Franco and Ciccio.

== Cast ==
- Franco Franchi as Franco
- Ciccio Ingrassia as Ciccio
- Didi Perego as Assunta
- Franco Giacobini as Serg. Pancani
- Umberto D'Orsi as Alfredo Brambilla
- Mario Pisu as Colonel Rigamonti
- Gabriele Antonini as Federico Giustini
- Vittorio Congia as Mario
- Stelvio Rosi as Gino Zangheri
- Paola Pitti as Claretta
- Gioia Ferrari as Laura
- Daniela Surina as Lidia
- Pietro De Vico as Nicola Cacace
- Enzo Garinei as Il Caporale
- Gino Buzzanca as Maresciallo Luigi Donatone
- Tony Renis as himself
