= In ginocchio da te (film) =

1964 film

- Directed by: Ettore Maria Fizzarotti
- Screenplay by: Giovanni Grimaldi; Bruno Corbucci
- Produced by: Goffredo Lombardo
- Starring: Gianni Morandi; Laura Efrikian; Nino Taranto
- Cinematography: Stelvio Massi
- Edited by: Franco Fraticelli
- Music by: Ennio Morricone
- Distributed by: Titanus
- Release date: 1964
- Language: Italian

In ginocchio da te (lit. 'On my knees before you') is a 1964 Italian musicarello film directed by Ettore Maria Fizzarotti and starring Gianni Morandi. It is based on the Morandi's song with the same title. In spite of its poor critical reception, the film was a massive success, grossing over 896 million lire.

The film has been described as "one of the foundational titles of the genre, particularly in marking the transition to a new phase of the musicarello, namely productions built around a single major pop star and with a story structured around that artist's most current hit song.".

== Cast ==
- Gianni Morandi as Gianni Traimonti
- Laura Efrikian as Carla Todisco
- Nino Taranto as Marshal Antonio Todisco
- Enrico Viarisio as Colonel Enzo
- Margaret Lee as Beatrice Di Bassano
- Dolores Palumbo as Santina De Micheli-Todisco
- Gino Bramieri as Ginone Traimonti
- Raffaele Pisu as Raffaele
- Carlo Taranto as Sergeant Scannapietra
- Stelvio Rosi as Giorgio Di Bassano
- Vittorio Congia as Nando Tazza
- Fabrizio Capucci as Luigi Addora
- Dino Mele as Ciccio Marletta
- Rosita Pisano as Dolores
- Enzo Cerusico as Gualtiero
- Ave Ninchi as Cesira
- Franco Ressel as Gian Maria
- Enzo Tortora as Himself
