= Nessuno mi può giudicare (1966 film) =

- Directed by: Ettore Maria Fizzarotti
- Written by: Giovanni Grimaldi
- Story by: Sergio Bonotti
- Starring: Laura Efrikian
- Cinematography: Stelvio Massi
- Edited by: Roberto Perpignani
- Music by: Gianfranco Monaldi
- Distributed by: Titanus
- Release date: 1966
- Country: Italy
- Language: Italian

Nessuno mi può giudicare (Italian pronunciation: [nesˈsuːno mi ˈpwɔ ddʒudiˈkaːre]; meaning: "Nobody can judge me") is a 1966 Italian "musicarello" film directed by Ettore Maria Fizzarotti. It is named after the Caterina Caselli's hit song "Nessuno mi può giudicare". It had a sequel titled Perdono released the same year.

== Plot ==
Federico, having arrived in Rome to look for work, is run over by the director of the Department Stores; he meets him again shortly after, because he has an interview with him, who hires him as an elevator operator.

The boy then meets Laura, the shop assistant, but their love is thwarted by the girl's boss, who is infatuated with her.

== Cast ==
- Laura Efrikian as Laura
- Fabrizio Moroni as Federico
- Caterina Caselli as Caterina
- Alberto Terrani as Alberto
- Clelia Matania as Adelina
- Nino Taranto as Antonio
- Gino Bramieri as Director
- Vittorio Congia as Vittorio
- Wanda Capodaglio as Laura's Grandma
- Carlo Taranto as Peppiniello
