= Non son degno di te (film) =

- Directed by: Ettore Maria Fizzarotti
- Written by: Bruno Corbucci; Giovanni Grimaldi
- Starring: Gianni Morandi; Laura Efrikian
- Cinematography: Stelvio Massi
- Edited by: Franco Fraticelli
- Music by: Ennio Morricone
- Release date: 1965
- Country: Italy
- Language: Italian

Non son degno di te is a 1965 Italian musicarello romance film directed by Ettore Maria Fizzarotti.

== Cast ==
- Gianni Morandi as Gianni Traimonti
- Laura Efrikian as Carla Todisco
- Gino Bramieri as Ginone Traimonti
- Nino Taranto as Antonio Todisco
- Raffaele Pisu as Raffaele
- Stelvio Rosi as Giorgio Di Bassano
- Dolores Palumbo as Santina De Micheli Todisco
- Enrico Viarisio as Enzo
- Ave Ninchi as Cesira
- Carlo Taranto as Sgt. Scannapietra
- Dori Dorika as Miss Scannapietra
- Fabrizio Capucci as Luigi Addora
- Vittorio Congia as Nando Tazza
- Dino Mele as Ciccio Marletta
- Lena von Martens as Lena
- Aroldo Tieri as Funzionario TV
