= Mi vedrai tornare =

- Directed by: Ettore Maria Fizzarotti
- Written by: Sergio Bonotti; Giovanni Grimaldi
- Starring: Gianni Morandi; Elisabetta Wu; Nino Taranto; Enrico Viarisio; Raimondo Vianello; Sandra Mondaini
- Cinematography: Stelvio Massi
- Edited by: Roberto Perpignani
- Music by: Ennio Morricone
- Release date: 1966
- Country: Italy
- Language: Italian

Mi vedrai tornare (You will see me back) is a 1966 Italian musical romantic comedy film directed by Ettore Maria Fizzarotti. The title is a reference to the Gianni Morandi's eponymous song.

== Cast ==
- Gianni Morandi: Gianni Aleardi
- Elisabetta Wu: Princess Liù Toyo
- Lelio Luttazzi: Marco Aleardi
- Enrico Viarisio: Admiral Aleardi
- Xenia Valderi: Maria Aleardi
- Enzo Cerusico: Lt. Saro Spampinato
- Nino Taranto: Spampinato
- Raimondo Vianello: Tommaso
- Sandra Mondaini: Virginia
- Pietro De Vico: The Waiter
- Giuseppe Porelli: The Duke
- Loretta Goggi: Alice
