= Marisa Del Frate =

Italian singer and actress (1931–2015)

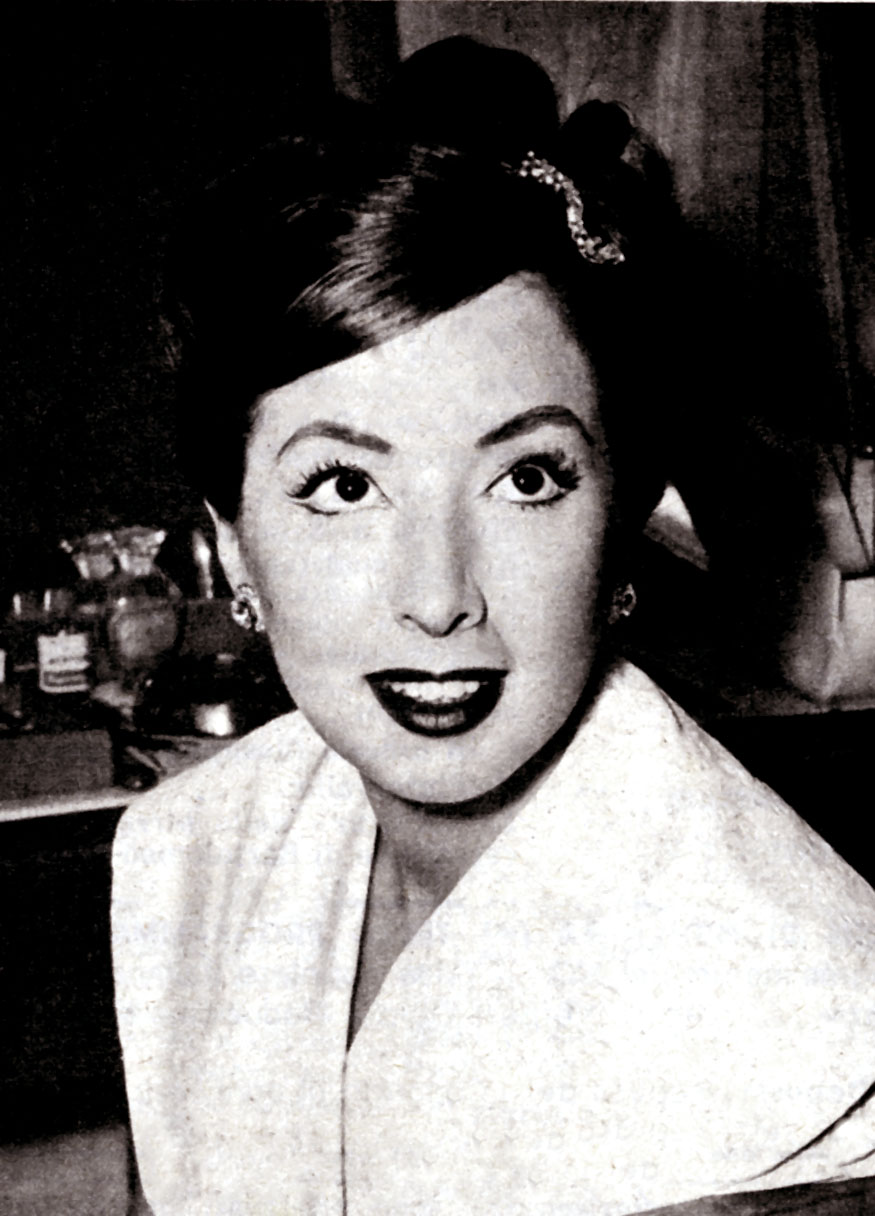
- Photo of Del Frate from the magazine Radiocorriere (1957)
- Born: 11 March 1931; Rome, Kingdom of Italy
- Died: 5 February 2015 (aged 83); Rome, Italy
- Occupations: Actress; singer

Marisa Del Frate (11 March 1931 – 5 February 2015) was an Italian singer, actress and television personality who was mainly active in the 1950s and 60s.

== Life and career ==
Born in Rome, Del Frate started her career as a model and took part in several beauty contests. In 1957, she successfully debuted as a singer winning the Festival di Napoli with the song "Malinconico autunno".

In 1958, Del Frate entered the competition at the Sanremo Music Festival with the songs "Quando il cuore" and "Ho disegnato un cuore". Shortly later, she was chosen by Erminio Macario as primadonna in the revue Chiamate Arturo 777; from then, Del Frate started a successful career as soubrette, actress, and television presenter. In 1961, Del Frate obtained large popularity thanks to the RAI television variety L'amico del giaguaro.

== Death ==
Marisa Del Frate died from cancer at age 83 in Rome in 2015.

== Discography ==
=== Album ===
- 1961 - Le canzoni de L'amico del giaguaro

=== Singles ===
- 1957: "Malinconico autunno" (Cetra SP 44)
- 1957: "Io e Ciccio cha cha cha" (Cetra, DC 6726)
- 1957: "Bene mio" (Cetra, DC 6771)
- 1957: "'O treno d'a fantasia" (Cetra, DC 6792)
- 1958: "Maistrale" (Cetra SP 243)
- 1958: "Maria Canaria" (Cetra, DC 6868)
- 1958: "Vita mia" (Cetra, DC 6871)
- 1958: "Un poco 'e sentimento" (Cetra, DC 6872)
- 1958: "È stato il vento" (Cetra, DC 6873)
- 1958: "Calypso melody" (Cetra, DC 6874)
- 1958: "Maistrale" (Cetra, DC 6930)
- 1958: "Sincerità" (Cetra, DC 6931)
- 1958: "'O calyppese napulitano" (Cetra, DC 6932)
- 1958: "Guardandoci" (Cetra, DC 6989)
- 1958: "Con te per l'eternità" (Cetra, DC 6991)
- 1958: "La donna di Marzo" (Cetra, DC 6992)
- 1958: "Per credere nel mondo" (Cetra, DC 6993)
- 1958: "Dominique / Autunno" (with Erminio Macario) (Cetra, DC 6988)
- 1958: "E' molto facile...dirsi addio" (Cetra, AC 3329)
- 1965: "I pensieri dell'amore" (CBS, 1611)
- 1965: "Anche se" (Derby, DB 5123)
- 1967: "Perché ci sei tu" (CBS, 2980)

== Filmography ==
- Perdono (1966)
- La ballata dei mariti (1963)
- Obiettivo ragazze (1963)
- Addio per sempre! (1958)
