= Il suo nome è Donna Rosa =

- Directed by: Ettore Maria Fizzarotti
- Screenplay by: Giovanni Grimaldi
- Story by: Ettore Maria Fizzarotti
- Starring: Romina Power; Al Bano; Dolores Palumbo; Stelvio Rosi; Nino Terzo; Enzo Cannavale; Enzo Guarini; Carlo Taranto; Anna Campori; Lisa Halvorsen; Nicoletta Elmi; Luciano Fineschi; Pippo Baudo; Walter Brugiolo; Nino Taranto; Bice Valori
- Cinematography: Stelvio Massi
- Edited by: Daniele Alabiso
- Music by: Luciano Fineschi; Pippo Baudo
- Release date: 1969
- Country: Italy
- Language: Italian

Il suo nome è Donna Rosa (Italian for Her name is Donna Rosa) is a 1969 Italian musicarello romantic comedy film directed by Ettore Maria Fizzarotti and starring Al Bano and Romina Power.

== Plot ==
Andrea, a young boatman from Capri, arrives in Naples on a commission; he clashes with Rosetta, a young student, and the clash causes him to break the arm of a jade statuette that he had to bring to an antiquarian, the widower Antonio Belmonte, who because of this pays him a lower price than hoped for.

It happens that Rosetta is the antiquarian's daughter, and having overheard the conversation in secret, she decides to bring Andrea's mother an envelope with some money to repay him for the damage she caused him.

The two young people thus begin dating and fall in love; Meanwhile, Rosetta's father woos Countess Rosa De Barberis, who however promised her deceased husband to marry only a nobleman, and for this reason Belmonte seeks the birth certificate of his great-great-grandfather, which would prove that his real surname is Di Belmonte and therefore is noble.

In the meantime, Rosetta mistakenly believes that Andrea is in love with a foreign tourist, and is therefore wooed by the son of Countess De Barberis, Giorgio, a lover of the game, who because of his "vice" puts his mother in trouble, forced to sell. the works of art of the house to settle the debts of the son; however, the situation is resolved and love triumphs.

== Cast ==
- Romina Power as Rosetta Belmonte
- Al Bano as Andrea
- Nino Taranto as Antonio Belmonte
- Bice Valori as Rosa De Barberis
- Dolores Palumbo as Madre di Andrea
- Pippo Baudo as Duke Pippo
- Stelvio Rosi as Giorgio De Barberis
- Nino Terzo as Gaetano
- Enzo Cannavale as Gennarino
- Enzo Guarini as Avvocato
- Carlo Taranto as Francesco
- Luciano Fineschi as Fefè
- Anna Campori as Carmela
- Nicoletta Elmi as Rosy
