= Mogli pericolose =

- Directed by: Luigi Comencini
- Screenplay by: Edoardo Anton; Luigi Comencini
- Produced by: Ugo Guerra; Marcello Fondato
- Cinematography: Armando Nannuzzi
- Edited by: Nino Baragli
- Music by: Felice Montagnini; Domenico Modugno
- Release date: 1958
- Running time: 97 minutes
- Country: Italy
- Language: Italian

Mogli pericolose ("Dangerous wives") is a 1958 Italian comedy film written and directed by Luigi Comencini.

== Cast ==
- Sylva Koscina: Tosca, Pirro's wife
- Dorian Gray: Ornella, Bruno's wife
- Renato Salvatori: Dr. Federico Carpi
- Nino Taranto: Pirro
- Franco Fabrizi: Bruno
- Mario Carotenuto: Benito "Benny" Bertuetti
- Giorgia Moll: Claudina Carpi
- Pupella Maggio: Aurelia "Lolita" Bertuetti
- Bruno Carotenuto: Tato
- Maria Pia Casilio: Elisa
- Rosalba Neri: Angelina
- Pina Gallini: Mrs. Zamparini
- Pina Renzi: Ornella's mother
- Nando Bruno: Taxi driver
- Yvette Masson: Corinne
- Vittoria Crispo: Caterina
- Ciccio Barbi: Ciccio
