= The Warm Life =

- Directed by: Florestano Vancini
- Written by: Florestano Vancini; Marcello Fondato; Elio Bartolini
- Starring: Catherine Spaak
- Cinematography: Roberto Gerardi
- Music by: Carlo Rustichelli
- Release date: 1963
- Country: Italy
- Language: Italian

The Warm Life (Italian: La calda vita) is a 1963 Italian drama film written and directed by Florestano Vancini and starring Catherine Spaak. It is based loosely on the novel La calda vita by Pier Antonio Quarantotti Gambini.

== Plot ==
Two young men persuade a young woman to take a vacation with them on an island. They compete for her affections, but she chooses an older man, and tragedy follows.

== Cast ==
- Catherine Spaak as Sergia
- Fabrizio Capucci as Max
- Jacques Perrin as Freddi
- Gabriele Ferzetti as Guido
- Halina Zalewska
- Marcella Rovena
- Daniele Vargas
