= Angelo Ephrikian =

Italian musicologist and violinist (1913–1982)

Angelo Ephrikian Անջելո Էֆրիկյան
- Also known as: Vahan Ephrikian
- Born: 20 October 1913 Treviso, Kingdom of Italy
- Died: 30 October 1982 (aged 69) Rome, Italy
- Genres: Classical
- Occupations: Musicologist; violinist
- Instrument: Violin

Angelo Hakobi Ephrikian (Armenian: Անջելո Հակոբի Էֆրիկյան, romanized: Anjelo Hakobi Ēfrikyan; 20 October 1913 – 30 October 1982), also known as Vahan Ephrikian (Armenian: Վահան Էֆրիկյան), was an Italian musicologist and violinist of Armenian descent.

Angelo Ephrikian was born in Treviso, Italy. He learned the violin from 1919, with Luigi Ferro. However, after he attended law school he immediately began working in the legal field. He then gave up his legal career in order to join the resistance movement against Italian fascism by joining partisan forces. However, after World War II, he immediately became a musical conductor. Ephrikian was a pioneer of early Italian music. He took a very active part in the rediscovery of the works of Vivaldi, and directed the first contemporary opera of Vivaldi's Fida Ninfa in 1958. He founded the independent Arcophon record label in 1960, recorded the complete works of Gesualdo with the Quintetto Vocale Italiano by 1965. This was reissued by Newton Classics on 6 CDs in 2012.

Ephrikian died in Rome in 1982. His daughter, Laura Ephrikian, is an actress.

== Selected discography ==
- Boccherini: La Clementina
- Mozart: Eine Kleine Nachtmusik
- Monteverdi: Messa a 4 Voci
- Benedetto Marcello: Sinfonias I Solisti di Milano
- Alessandro Scarlatti: Concerti Grossi 1-12 I Solisti di Milano
- Carissimi: Dives Malus
- Jacopo Peri: Euridice. Recording: I Solisti di Milano, 1966, Arcophon Am 661/2.
