= Il ragazzo che sorride =

1969 film

- Directed by: Aldo Grimaldi
- Written by: Giovanni Grimaldi
- Starring: Al Bano; Rocky Roberts; Susanna Martinková
- Cinematography: Angelo Lotti
- Edited by: Daniele Alabiso
- Music by: Carlo Rustichelli
- Distributed by: Titanus
- Release date: 1969
- Country: Italy
- Language: Italian

Il ragazzo che sorride (Italian for The boy who smiles) is a 1969 Italian musicarello comedy film directed by Aldo Grimaldi and starring Al Bano and Susanna Martinková.

== Cast ==
- Al Bano as Giorgio
- Susanna Martinková as Livia
- Rocky Roberts as himself
- Nino Taranto as Filippo Leccisi
- Antonella Steni as Tilde, Filippo's wife
- Yvonne Sanson as Livia's mother
- Riccardo Garrone as Livia's father
- Francesco Mulé as Undertaker's establishment owner
- Franco Ressel as Mine owner
- Fiorenzo Fiorentini as House-painter
- Franco Scandurra as Scandini
- Giacomo Furia as Barman
- Umberto Raho as Dr. Scholler
- Ignazio Balsamo as Assistant of engineer
- Carlo Taranto as Hotel concierge
- Nino Terzo as Male nurse
