= Fabrizio Capucci =

Italian actor and producer (1939–2024)

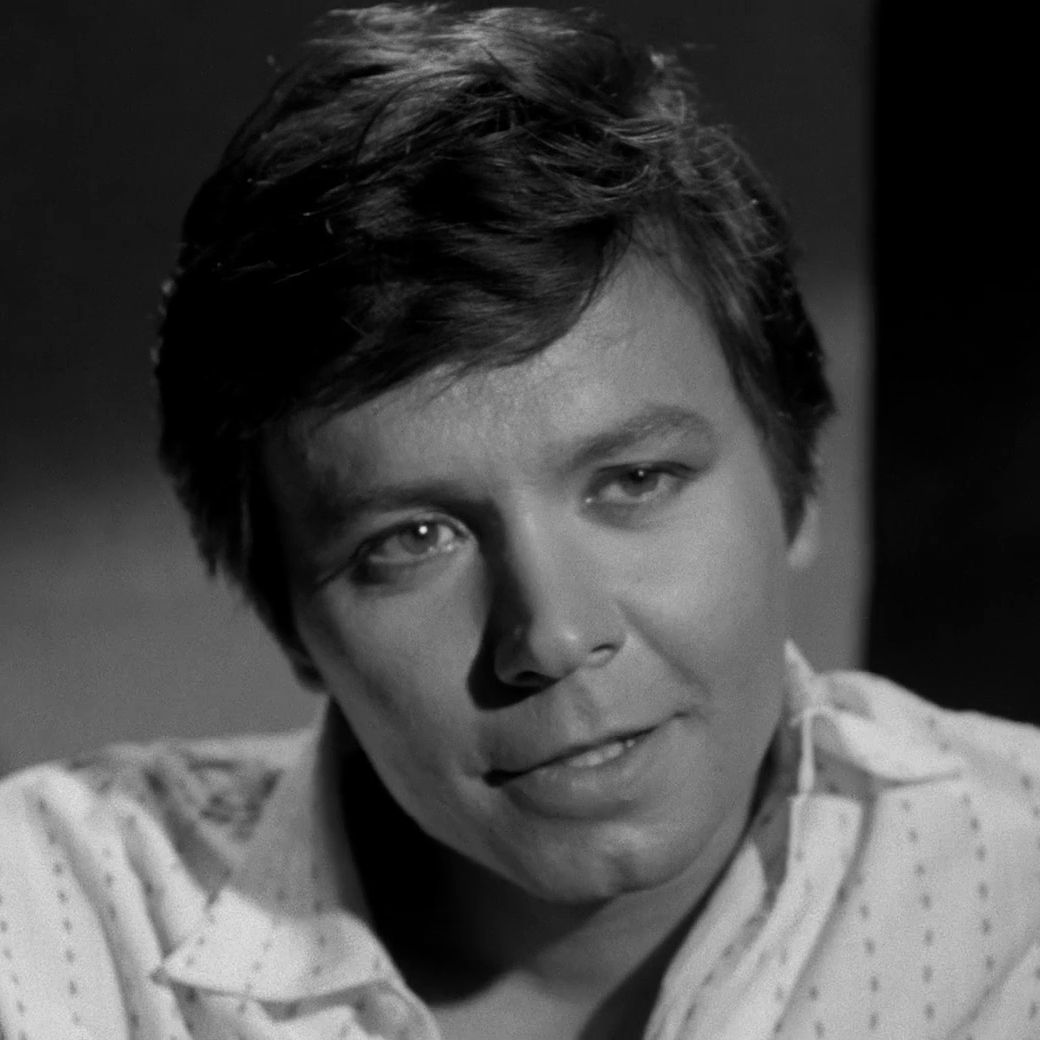
- Capucci in Rita the American Girl (1965)
- Born: 4 August 1939; Rome, Italy
- Died: 19 December 2024 (aged 85); Rome, Italy
- Occupation: Actor

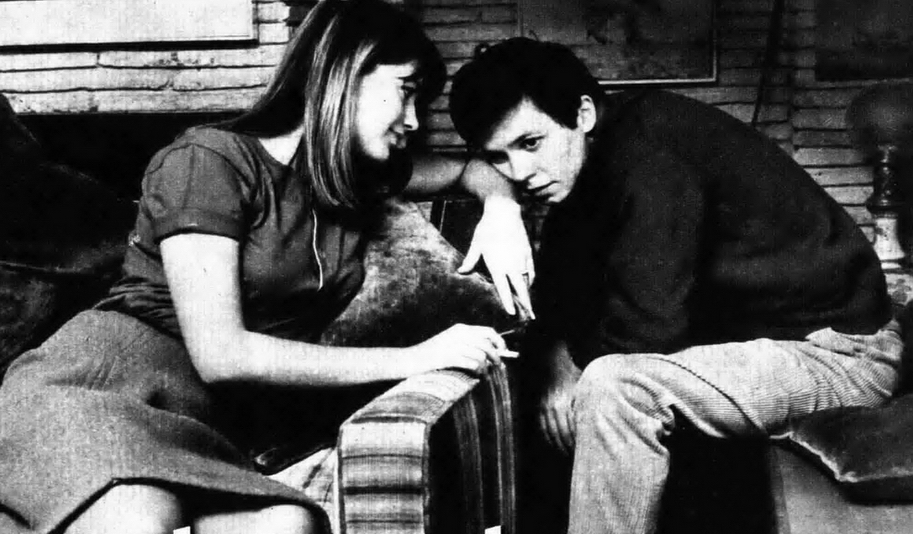
Capucci and Catherine Spaak in 1963

Fabrizio Capucci (4 August 1939 – 19 December 2024) was an Italian actor and producer.

== Life and career ==
Born in Rome, the brother of the fashion designer Roberto, Capucci studied acting at the drama school held by Pietro Sharoff in his hometown. After appearing in several supporting roles, he had his breakout with the role of Max in Florestano Vancini's The Warm Life. He was also active in a number of television miniseries and recorded some singles.

After retiring from acting, Capucci started a career as a producer of commercials. In 2004 he ran in the Lazio regional election for the Union of Democrats for Europe party, without being elected. He was also president of the football team Viterbese for two years.

Capucci was married to actress Catherine Spaak. They had a daughter, Sabrina. Capucci died in Rome on 19 December 2024, at the age of 85.

== Selected filmography ==
- First Love (1959)
- Crazy Desire (1962)
- Eighteen in the Sun (1962)
- The Warm Life (1963)
- In ginocchio da te (1964)
- Highest Pressure (1965)
- Non son degno di te (1965)
- Rita the American Girl (1965)
- To Commit a Murder (1967)
- They Came to Rob Las Vegas (1968)
- Colt 38 Special Squad (1976)
