= The Young Nun =

La suora giovane
- Directed by: Bruno Paolinelli
- Written by: Giovanni Arpino (novel)
- Produced by: Italspettacolo
- Starring: Laura Efrikian; Jonathan Elliot
- Cinematography: Erico Menczer
- Music by: Teo Usuelli
- Release date: 1965
- Country: Italy
- Language: Italian

The Young Nun or La suora giovane is a 1965 Italian romantic drama film directed by Bruno Paolinelli. The film had cinematography by Erico Menczer and starred Laura Efrikian and Jonathan Elliot with music by Teo Usuelli.

== Cast ==
- Laura Efrikian ... Serena
- Jonathan Elliot
- Cesarino Miceli Picardi ... Mo
- Carlo Alighiero ... Oste
- Maria Sardoch
- Adelaide Aste ... Iris
- Emilio Esposito ... Antonio Mathis
- Marcella Rovena
