= Gianni Morandi =

Italian singer (born 1944)

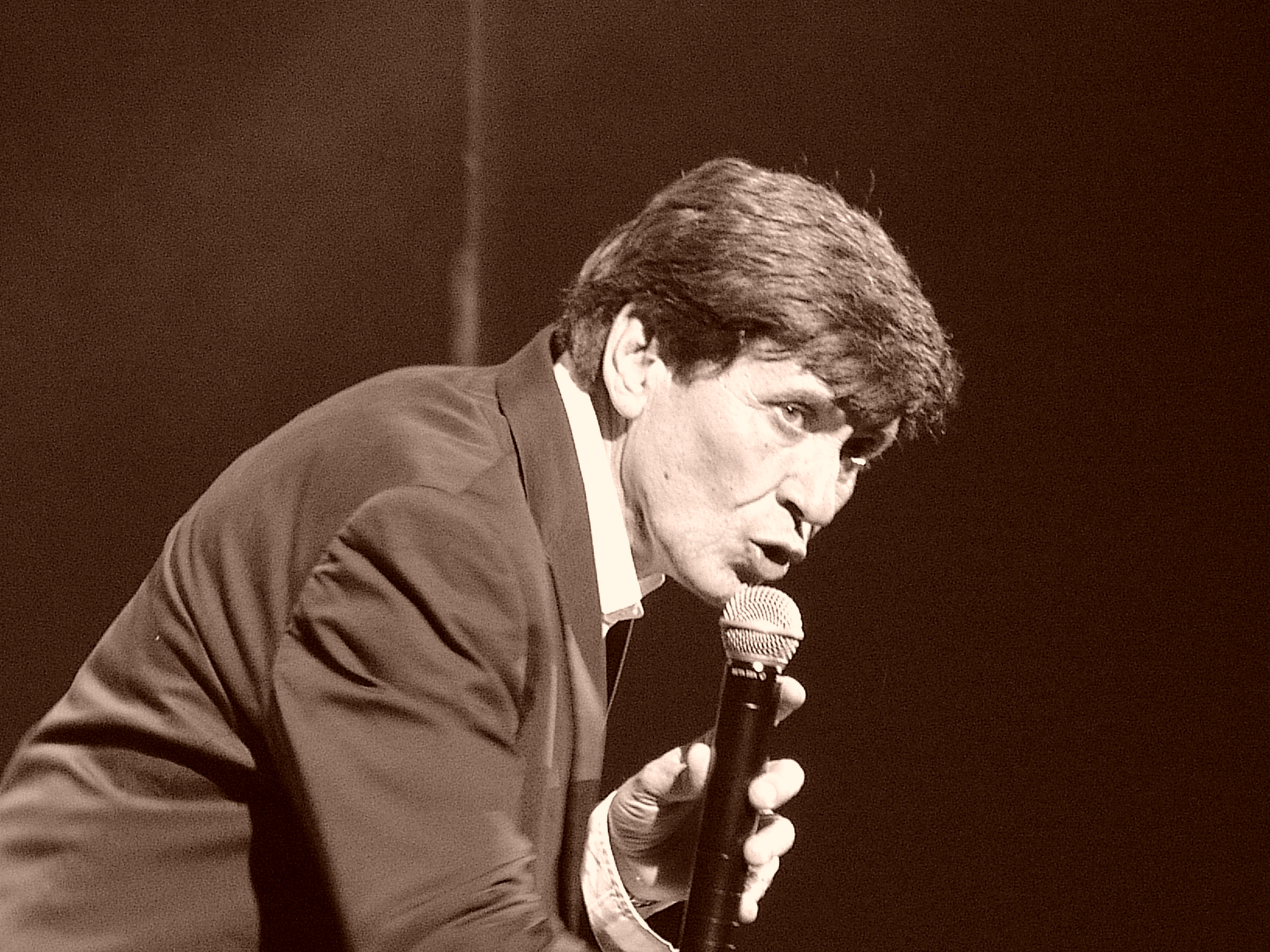
- Morandi in 2005

Background information
- Born: Gian Luigi Morandi; 11 December 1944 (age 81); Monghidoro, Emilia-Romagna, Kingdom of Italy
- Genres: Pop
- Occupations: Singer; actor; television personality
- Instruments: Vocals; guitar
- Years active: 1962–present
- Labels: RCA; Epic
- Spouses: Laura Efrikian (m. 1966; div. 1979); Anna Dan (m. 2004)
- Website: morandimania.it

Gian Luigi "Gianni" Morandi (Italian: [ˈdʒanni moˈrandi]; born 11 December 1944) is an Italian pop singer, actor and entertainer. It is estimated that Morandi has sold about 50 million recordings.

== Early life ==
Born in Monghidoro, Emilia-Romagna, the son of a cobbler, Morandi interrupted his studies after primary school to help support his family. While working in a cinema as a candy vendor he began performing as a singer between films. At 14 years old he entered the Scaglioni Orchestra, with whom he made his first tour in north Italy.

== Career ==
=== 1960s ===
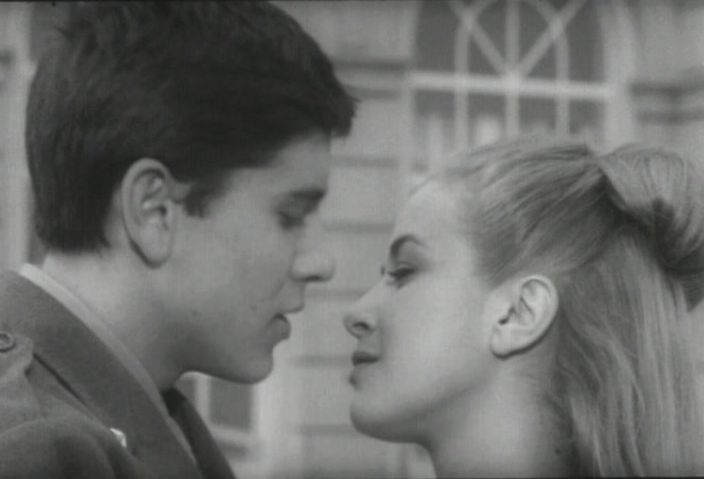
Morandi and Laura Efrikian in In ginocchio da te (1964)

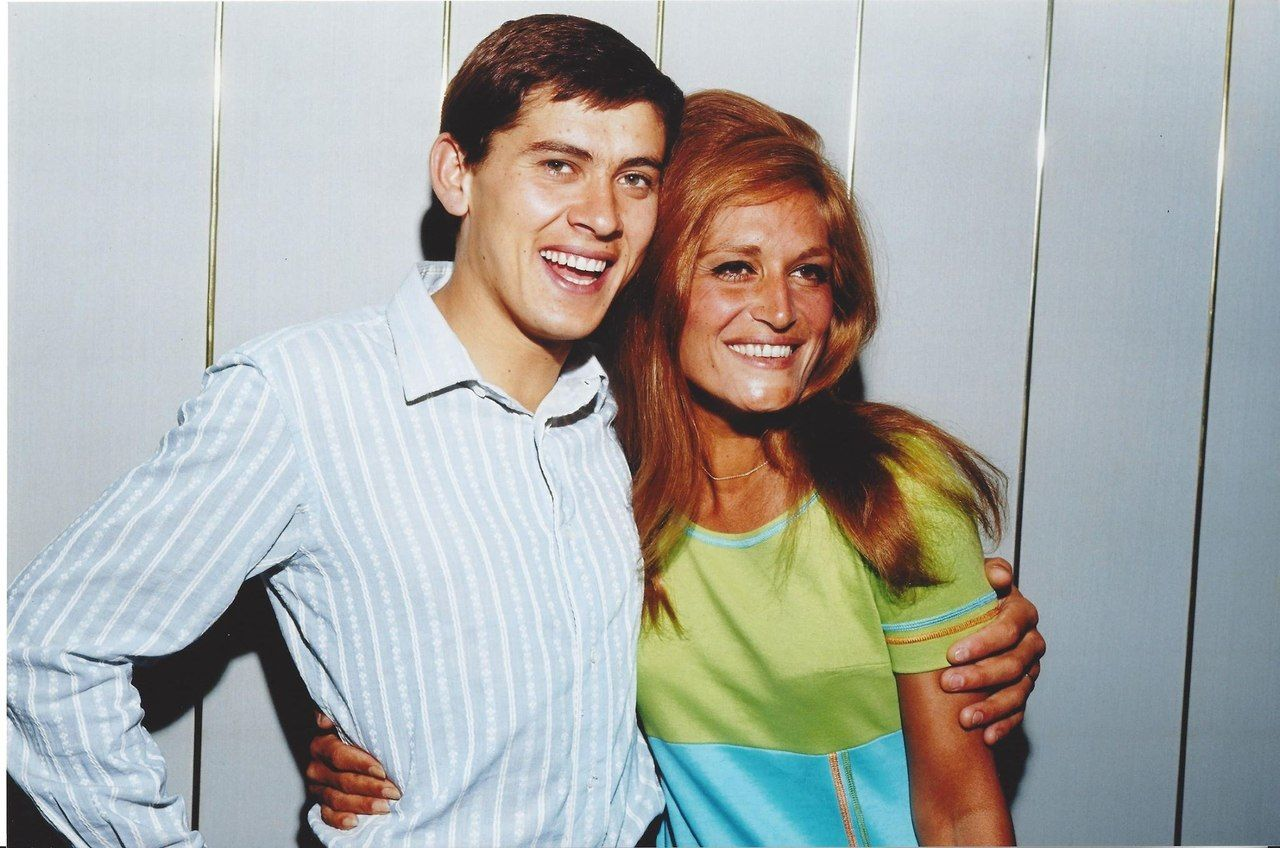
Morandi with Dalida during Cantagiro, 1968

After winning a music festival for newcomers in Bellaria – Igea Marina, in 1962 Morandi made an audition for RCA Italiana, and while his performance left dubious a large part of the commission he was put under contract for the insistence of Franco Migliacci, who became its producer and main author for the first part of his career. The same year Morandi made his record debut with "Andavo a 100 all'ora" and his television debut in the RAI show Alta pressione, where he launched his first hit "Fatti mandare dalla mamma a prendere il latte" and which gave him and Rita Pavone an early popularity as teen idols. In 1964, he got his first number one hit with "In ginocchio da te", which won the Cantagiro festival and was adapted into a musicarello film which turned to be a massive success, grossing over 800 million lire. The same year, he got another major hit with the Canzonissima winning song "Non son degno di te", and he held his first successful tour in Japan.

In 1965, Morandi had other two number one hits with "Se non avessi più te", with whom he placed second at Cantagiro, and the melanchonic "Si fa sera", and held a successful tour in South America. The following year was as well massimally successful thanks to "La fisarmonica", runner-up at Canzonissima, "Notte di ferragosto", which gave him a second Cantagiro win, the protest song "C'era un ragazzo che come me amava i Beatles e i Rolling Stones", and "Se perdo anche te", a cover of Neil Diamond's "Solitary Man". In early 1967, Morandi centered another major hit with the romantic "Un mondo d'amore" before taking a one-year break due to mandatory conscription. He reprised his career in April 1968, closing the decade with another string of hits, notably Cantagiro runner-up "Chimera", Canzonissima winning song "Scende la pioggia" (a cover of the Turtles' "Elenore") and "Bella Belinda".

=== 1970s ===
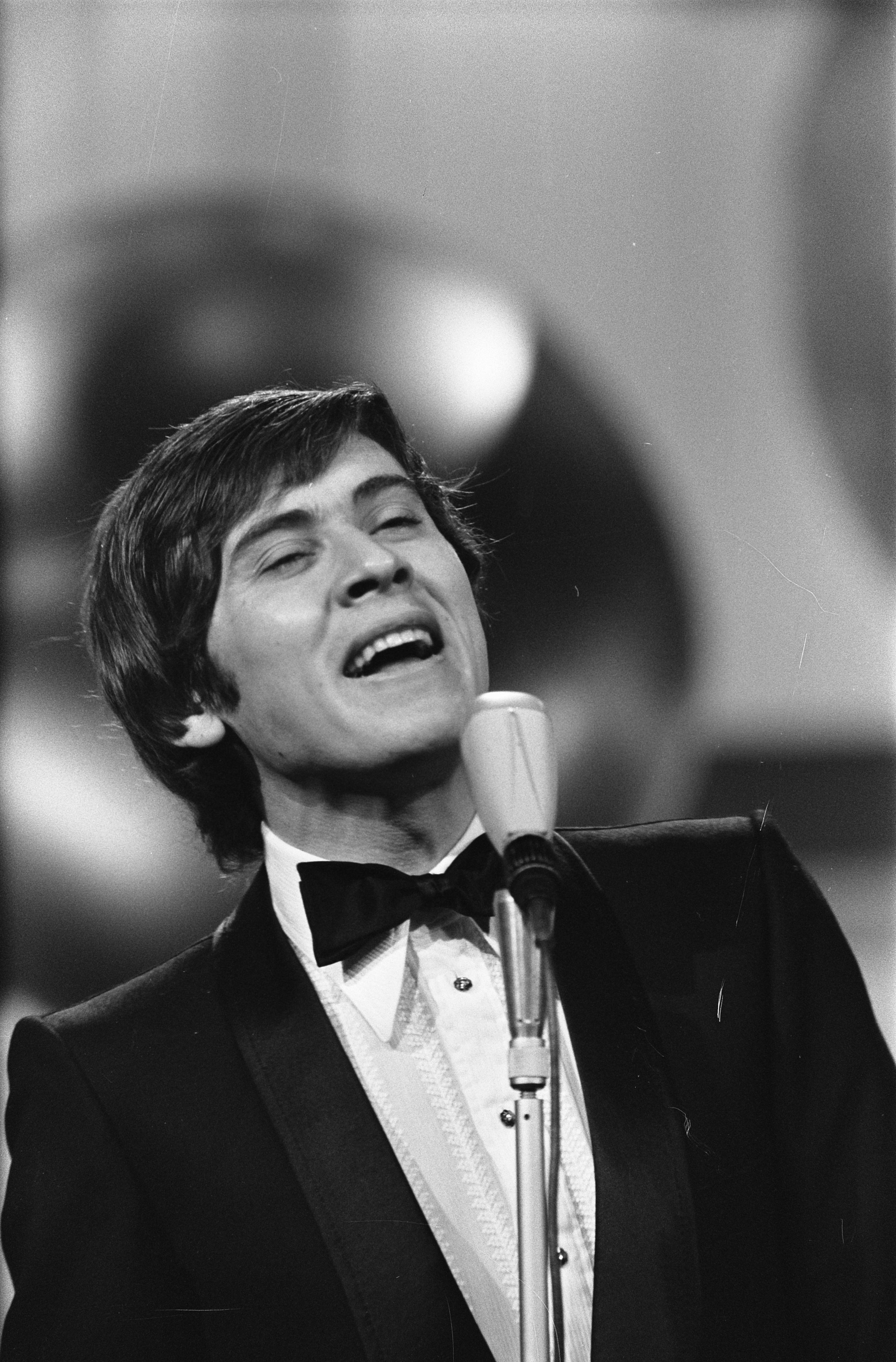
Morandi during Eurovision Song Contest 1970

The new decade opened in January for Morandi with another victory at Canzonissima, with the song "Ma chi se ne importa". The same year he enjoyed critical acclaim for his acting performance in Pietro Germi's A Pocketful of Chestnuts and represented Italy at the Eurovision Song Contest 1970 with the Lucio Dalla's penned "Occhi di ragazza". Following the two minor hits "Capriccio" and "Al bar si muore" he slowed his activities. In 1972 he took part for the first time in the Sanremo Music Festival with "Vado a lavorare", which was a commercial disappointment, and enjoyed a stage success with the musical Jacopone. In the following years, his career suffered a commercial downturn, with his ambitious 1975 album Il mondo di frutta candita, enterely penned by Oscar Prudente and Ivano Fossati, being a resounding failure.

In 1976, Morandi got an unexpected number one hit with the ecologist children song "Sei forte papà", opening song of the Saturday night show Rete Tre he co-hosted with Ombretta Colli and Arnoldo Foà. The same year he took part in the Tokyo Music Festival, winning the award for best performance with "Per poter vivere". At the end of the year he decided to take a hiatus from showbiz to study double bass at the Conservatorio Santa Cecilia.

=== 1980s ===
Morandi made his professional comeback in 1980, taking part in the 30th Sanremo Music Festival with a song penned by Ron and Francesco De Gregori, "Mariù", which got unnoticed. His career started rebounding with the Mogol-penned songs "Canzoni stonate" and "La mia nemica amatissima", the latter being his 1983 Sanremo entry. The same year he recorded a cover of Bob Seger's "We've Got Tonite" in a duet with Amii Stewart, "Grazie perchè"; the song was chosen as opening theme of Domenica in and reached the third place on the hit parade. Also important for his professional relaunch were three television miniseries he starred in between 1984 and 1987, Voglia di volare, Voglia di cantare, and Voglia di vincere.

After two well received albums (Immagine italiana and Uno su mille, whose title-track became a classic in his repertoire) and a Targa Tenco for best performer, Morandi won the Sanremo Music Festival 1987 with "Si può dare di più" together with Enrico Ruggeri and Umberto Tozzi. In 1988, he recorded a successful album in couple with Lucio Dalla, Dalla/Morandi, which launched by the singles "Dimmi dimmi" and "Vita" sold over one million copies. In July 1988, the duo embarked on a long tour, which ended in Madrid in April 1989. The decade ended for Morandi with another significant success, the half a million copies-selling album Varietà and its top ten singles, the Mogol-Lavezzi title-track and "Bella signora" by Lucio Dalla and Mauro Malavasi.

=== 1990s ===
In 1992 Morandi released the album Morandi Morandi, that included "Banane e lamponi", which became one of his best known songs of his repertoire. In 1995, he made his return at the Sanremo Festival, ranking second with "In amore", a duet with Barbara Cola. Anticipated by the lead single "Dove va a finire il mio affetto", in 1997 he released the album Celeste azzurro e blu. In 1999, he hosted the Rai 1 autobiographical musical show C'era un ragazzo, which achieved a large success, with an average of over 9 million viewers per episode.

=== 2000s ===
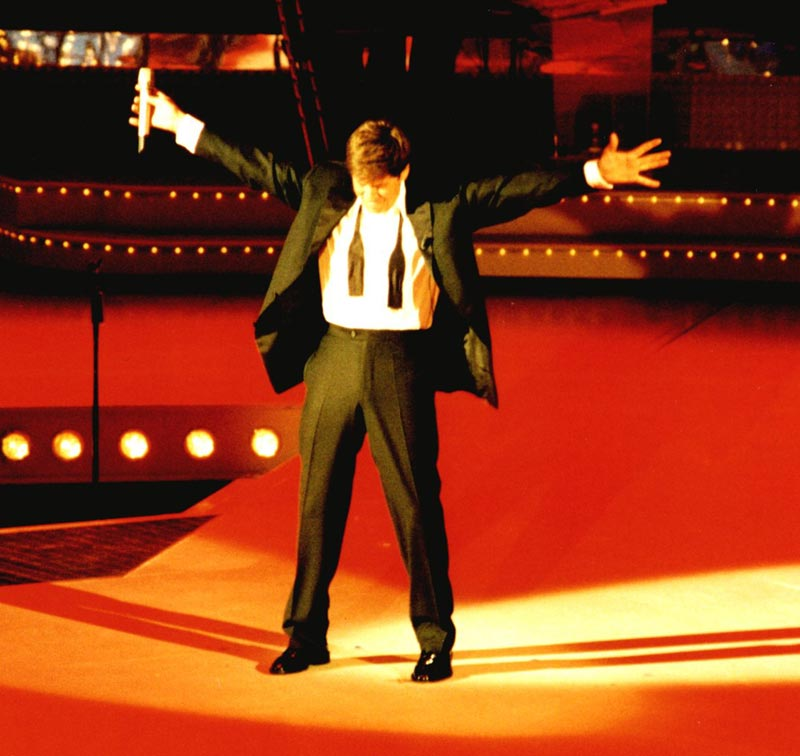
Morandi in 2002

In 2000, Eros Ramazzotti produced and penned all songs in Morandi's album Come fa bene l'amore. The lead single "Innamorato" premiered at the 50th Sanremo Festival, placing third. In 2002, Morandi co-hosted with Lorella Cuccarini and Paola Cortellesi the Rai 1 Saturday night show Uno di noi, and released the album L'amore ci cambia la vita, which was certified double platinum. In 2004, he released A chi si ama veramente, an album to which collaborated Gaetano Curreri, Luca Madonia and Mariella Nava, which like the previous one sold over 200,000 copies.

In 2006, Morandi hosted a new Rai 1 show, Non facciamoci prendere dal panico, released the new album Il tempo migliore, and penned an autobiography in a diary form, Diario di un ragazzo italiano. In 2009, he took part in the charity single "Domani 21/04.09", co-hosted with Alessandra Amoroso the television show Grazie a tutti and released the album of cover songs Canzoni da non perdere.

=== 2010s ===
Morandi was chosen to be the presenter of Sanremo Music Festival 2011, together with Belén Rodríguez, Elisabetta Canalis and comedians Luca Bizzarri and Paolo Kessisoglu from Italia 1's satire show Le Iene. In October 2011, he was confirmed as the presenter of the Sanremo Music Festival 2012.

At the beginning of 2016, Morandi started a tour called "Capitani Coraggiosi Tour" with Claudio Baglioni. A double album will be published on 5 February. In 2017, he recorded with Fabio Rovazzi the hit "Volare".

In 2019, his 1964 song "In ginocchio da te" gained renewed popularity as it was featured in one of the main scenes of the Academy Awards winning film Parasite.

=== 2020s ===
In 2020, Morandi participated in the charity single "Ma il cielo è sempre più blu", in support of the work of Italian Red Cross during the COVID-19 pandemic. In March 2021, Morandi had a serious domestic accident that left his right hand badly burnt and almost without mobility. In June he released the Jovanotti-penned single "L'allegria", and one year later he participated at the Sanremo Music Festival 2022, finishing third with "Apri tutte le porte", also penned by Jovanotti. One year later, he co-hosted with Amadeus the Sanremo Music Festival 2023.

== Personal life ==
In June 1966, Morandi married actress Laura Efrikian, with whom he starred in several musicarelli films, and they had two children, actress Marianna (b. 1969) and actor and singer Marco (b. 1974). The couple divorced in 1979.

From his relationship with Anna Dan, who became his second wife in November 2004, he had another son, Pietro (b. 1997), also a singer.

== Discography ==
=== Studio albums ===
- Gianni Morandi (1963)
- Ritratto di Gianni (1964)
- Gianni 3 (1966)
- Per amore... Per magia... (1967)
- Gianni 4 – Un mondo d'amore (1967)
- Gianni 5 (1968)
- Gianni 6 (1970)
- Gianni 7 (1970)
- Un mondo di donne (1971)
- Il mondo cambierà (1972)
- Jacopone (1973)
- Il mondo di frutta candita (1975)
- Per poter vivere (1976)
- Old Parade Morandi (1978)
- Abbraciamoci (1979)
- Cantare (1980)
- Morandi (1982)
- La mia nemica amatissima (1983)
- Immagine italiana (1984)
- Uno su mille (1985)
- Le italiane sono belle (1987)
- Dalla/Morandi (1988)
- Varietà (1989)
- Morandi Morandi (1992)
- Morandi (1995)
- Celeste azzurro e blu (1997)
- Come fa bene l'amore (2000)
- L'amore ci cambia la vita (2002)
- A chi si ama veramente (2004)
- Il tempo migliore (2006)
- Canzoni da non perdere (2009)
- Bisogna vivere (2013)
- D'amore d'autore (2017)
- Evviva! (2023)
- L'attrazione (2024)

=== Live albums ===
- Cantare (1980)
- Morandi in teatro (1986)
- Live @RTSI Gianni Morandi (1999)
- Grazie a tutti, il concerto (2009)
- Capitani coraggiosi – Il live (2016)

== Filmography ==
=== Films ===
Year	Title	Role(s)	Notes
1963	Sexy Toto	Himself	Cameo appearance
1964	In ginocchio da te	Gianni Traimonti	
1965	Highest Pressure	Himself	Cameo appearance
1965	Non son degno di te	Gianni Traimonti	
1965	Se non avessi più te	Gianni Traimonti	
1966	Mi vedrai tornare	Gianni Aleardi	
1967	Per amore... per magia...	Aladdin	
1968	Chimera	Gianni Raimondi	
1969	Faccia da schiaffi	Nino	
1970	A Pocketful of Chestnuts	Luigi Vivarelli	
1971	Il provinciale	Giovanni DiGiacomo	
1972	La cosa buffa	Antonio	
1973	Società a responsabilità molto limitata	Enea Marano	
1983	"FF.SS." – Cioè: "...che mi hai portato a fare sopra a Posillipo se non mi vuoi più bene?"	Himself	Cameo appearance
1985	Azzurri	Himself	Uncredited
1999	Dirty Linen	Himself	Cameo appearance
2004	Natale a casa Deejay	Runner #01	Cameo appearance
2007	Linee d'ombra	Himself	Documentary film
2009	Pietro Germi: Il bravo, il bello, il cattivo	Himself	Documentary film
2012	The Landlords	Fausto Mieli	
2016	The Pills - Sempre meglio che lavorare	Himself	Cameo appearance
2018	I'm Back	Himself	Cameo appearance
2022	Sulle nuvole	Himself	Cameo appearance

=== Television ===
Year	Title	Role(s)	Notes
1967	TuttoTotò	Himself	Episode: "TotòCiak"
1967	Dietro le quinte: Gianni Morandi e Patty Pravo	Himself / Performer	Special
1968	Senza Rete	Himself / Guest host	Variety show (season 1)
1969	Stasera Gianni Morandi	Himself / Host	Special
1970	Canzonissima	Himself / Contestant	Variety/musical program (season 8)
1970	Eurovision Song Contest 1970	Himself / Contestant	Annual music contest
1972	Sanremo Music Festival 1972	Himself / Contestant	Performing "Vado a lavorare" (4th place)
1975	Alle nove della sera	Himself / Host	Variety/musical show
1976	Rete tre	Himself / co-host	Variety show
1978–1979	10 Hertz	Himself / Host	Variety show
1980	Sanremo Music Festival 1980	Himself / Contestant	Performing "Marilù" (4th place)
1981	Un disco per l'estate 1981	Himself / Host	Annual music festival
1982	Tutti insieme	Himself / Host	Variety show
1983	Sanremo Music Festival 1983	Himself / Contestant	Performing "La mia nemica amatissima" (8° place)
1984	Voglia di volare	Davide Gabrielli	Lead role; 4 episodes
1985	Voglia di cantare	Paolo Fontana	Television film
1987	Sanremo Music Festival 1987	Himself / Contestant	Performing "Si può dare di più" (Winner)
1987	La voglia di vincere	Marco	3 episodes
1988	Fantastico	Himself / Performer	Variety show (season 8)
1990	Gianni Morandi: Questa è la storia	Himself / Host	Special
1993	In fuga per la vita	Michele	Lead role; 3 episodes
1995	Sanremo Music Festival 1995	Himself / Contestant	Performing "In amore" (2nd place)
1995	La voce del cuore	Daniele Montero	Lead role; 4 episodes
1998	La forza dell'amore	Fabrizio	2 episodes
1999	C'era un ragazzo	Himself / Host	Variety/musical show
2000	Sanremo Music Festival 2000	Himself / Contestant	Performing "Innamorato" (3rd place)
2000	Un disco per l'estate 2000	Himself / Regular guest	Annual music festival
2002–2003	Uno di noi	Himself / Host	Variety show
2004	Stasera Gianni Morandi	Himself / Host	Variety/musical show
2006	La nostra storia - 25 anni con la Nazionale Italiana Cantanti	Himself	Special
2009	Grazie a tutti	Himself / Host	Variety show
2011	Sanremo Music Festival 2011	Himself / Host	Annual music festival
2012	Sanremo Music Festival 2012	Himself / Host	Annual music festival
2013	The Voice of Italy	Himself / Special coach	Talent show (season 1)
2013	Gianni Morandi - Live in Arena	Himself / Headliner	Concert event
2015	Capitani coraggiosi	Himself / Co-host	Special
2016	Untraditional	Himself	Episode: "Un ricco spuntino"
2017–2019	L'isola di Pietro	Dr. Pietro Sereni	Lead role; 18 episodes
2018	Io e Lucio: Dalla-Morandi solo 30 anni fa	Himself / co-host	Special
2022	Sanremo Music Festival 2022	Himself / Contestant	Performing "Apri tutte le porte" (3rd place)
2022	Caro Battiato	Himself	Television movie
2023	Sanremo Music Festival 2023	Himself / co-host	Annual music festival

== Honours ==
- Commander of the Order of Merit of the Italian Republic (24 January 2005)
- Honorary citizenship of the Municipality of Carloforte (Carloforte, 28 June 2019)
- Golden Neptune of the City of Bologna (Bologna, 3 March 2022)

Awards and achievements
Preceded by Iva Zanicchi with Due grosse lacrime bianche	Italy in the Eurovision Song Contest; 1970	Succeeded by Massimo Ranieri with L'amore è un attimo
Preceded by Eros Ramazzotti with "Adesso tu"	Sanremo Music Festival; Winner; 1987	Succeeded by Massimo Ranieri with "Perdere l'amore"
