= Maschio latino cercasi =

1977 film by Giovanni Narzisi

- Directed by: Giovanni Narzisi
- Written by: Giovanni Narzisi
- Produced by: Bruno Liconti, Giulio Scanni
- Cinematography: Angelo Lotti
- Edited by: Raimondo Crociani, Marcello Malvestito
- Music by: Lelio Luttazzi
- Production companies: Pelican Film, Staff Professionalisti Associati
- Distributed by: Capitol
- Release date: 28 February 1977
- Running time: 90 minutes
- Country: Italy
- Language: Italian

Maschio latino cercasi (also known as L'affare si ingrossa) is a 1977 commedia sexy all'italiana film directed by Giovanni Narzisi and starring Dayle Haddon, Gloria Guida, and Stefania Casini.

== Cast ==
- Adriana Asti as Sisina
- Gino Bramieri as Bubi Bislecchi / Otto Himmel
- Vittorio Caprioli as Carmine
- Stefania Casini as Anna
- Gianfranco D'Angelo as the German tourist
- Salvatore Funari as Nanninella
- Carlo Giuffrè as Baron Nicolino di Castropizzo
- Gloria Guida as Gigia
- Dayle Haddon as the lawyer
- Aldo Maccione as Amilcare
- Orazio Orlando as Gennarino Esposito
- Brigitte Petronio as Frau Walter
- Luciano Salce as Guido Fiasconi
