= Un mondo d'amore =

Single by Gianni Morandi

from the album Gianni quattro
- B-side: "Questa vita cambierà"
- Released: 1967
- Genre: Pop
- Label: RCA
- Songwriter(s): Franco Migliacci, Sante Romitelli, Bruno Zambrini

Gianni Morandi singles chronology
"C'era un ragazzo che come me..." (1966)	"Un mondo d'amore" (1967)	"Dammi la mano per ricominciare" (1967)

"Un mondo d'amore" ('A world of love') is a song composed by Franco Migliacci, Sante Maria Romitelli and Bruno Zambrini and performed by Gianni Morandi. It was chosen by RAI as the theme song of the program Giovani.

The single peaked at first place for five consecutive weeks between May and June 1967 on the Italian hit parade and was among the ten best-selling singles of the year. It is considered a "classic" and a "generational hymn".

The song was later covered by several artists, including Thelma Houston (with the title "A World Of Love"), Joan Baez and Fiorello.

== Track listing ==
- 7" single – PM45 3390
1. "Un mondo d'amore" (Franco Migliacci, Sante Romitelli, Bruno Zambrini) - 2:32
2. "Questa vita cambierà" (Luis Enriquez Bacalov, Franco Migliacci, Bruno Zambrini ) - 2:30

== Charts ==
Chart (1967)	Peak position
Italy (Musica e dischi)	1
