= Tears on Your Face =

- Directed by: Ettore Maria Fizzarotti
- Written by: Giovanni Grimaldi; Bruno Corbucci
- Starring: Bobby Solo
- Cinematography: Stelvio Massi
- Edited by: Franco Fraticelli
- Music by: Gianni Marchetti
- Release date: 1964
- Country: Italy
- Language: Italian

Tears on Your Face (Italian: Una lacrima sul viso) is a 1964 Italian musicarello film directed by Ettore Maria Fizzarotti. Its Italian title is taken from the hit song of the same name by the film's star Bobby Solo.

== Cast ==
- Bobby Solo: Bobby Tonner
- Laura Efrikian: Lucia
- Nino Taranto: Professor Giovanni Todini
- Lucy D'Albert: Luisa Todini
- Dolores Palumbo: Teresa
- Lena von Martens: Gabriella
- Dante Maggio: Traffic policeman
- Agostino Salvietti: Vincenzo
- Carlo Taranto: Guitarist
