= Husbands in the City =

1957 film

- Directed by: Luigi Comencini
- Screenplay by: Sandro Continenza; Suso Cecchi D'Amico; Dino Verde
- Story by: Alfredo Mirabile; Luigi Comencini; Gino Visentini
- Produced by: Edoardo Anton; Ruggero Maccari
- Cinematography: Armando Nannuzzi
- Edited by: Nino Baragli
- Music by: Felice Montagnini; Domenico Modugno
- Release date: 1957
- Running time: 95 minutes
- Country: Italy
- Language: Italian

Husbands in the City (Italian: Mariti in città) is a 1957 Italian comedy film directed by Luigi Comencini.

== Plot ==
When wives go on vacation, husbands hope to have fun but they don't always succeed.

== Cast ==
- Nino Taranto: Giacinto
- Franco Fabrizi: Alberto
- Renato Salvatori: Mario
- Dolores Palumbo: Doorwoman
- Memmo Carotenuto: Fernando
- Dina Perbellini: Mother-in-law
- Marisa Merlini: Aida
- Yvette Masson: Quinta
- Irene Cefaro: Gina
- Franca Gandolfi: Sandrina
- Franca Valeri: Olivetti
- Giorgia Moll: Lionella
- Hélène Rémy: Romana
- Clara Bindi: Giacinto's wife
