= C'era un ragazzo che come me amava i Beatles e i Rolling Stones =

Single by Gianni Morandi

from the album Gianni quattro
- B-side: "Se perdo anche te"
- Released: January 1966
- Genre: Pop
- Label: RCA
- Songwriters: Mauro Lusini, Franco Migliacci

Gianni Morandi singles chronology
"Notte di ferragosto" (1966)	"C'era un ragazzo che come me amava i Beatles e i Rolling Stones" (1966)	"Un mondo d'amore" (1967)

"C'era un ragazzo che come me amava i Beatles e i Rolling Stones" ('There was a boy who - like me - loved the Beatles and the Rolling Stones') is a song composed by Mauro Lusini and Franco Migliacci, and performed by Gianni Morandi.

The song premiered at the third Festival delle Rose, in which Morandi presented the song in couple with the author Lusini. A protest ballad against the Vietnam War, it was censored by RAI television and radio for being polemic towards the policies of an allied state. The B-side of the single is "Se perdo anche te", a cover of Neil Diamond's "Solitary Man". Both songs are arranged by Ennio Morricone.

The song was later covered by several artists, including Joan Baez, Lucio Dalla, Fiorello, Os Incríveis, Engenheiros do Hawaii, Poyushchiye Gitary and Yegor Letov.

== Track listing ==
- 7" single – PM45 3375
1. "C'era un ragazzo che come me amava i Beatles e i Rolling Stones" (Mauro Lusini, Franco Migliacci) - 3:05
2. "Se perdo anche te" (Neil Diamond, Franco Migliacci, Loris Bazzocchi) - 2:26

== Charts ==
Chart (1966–67)	Peak position
Brazil (IBOPE)	3
Italy (Musica e dischi)	3

== See also ==
- List of anti-war songs
