= Highest Pressure =

Altissima pressione
- Directed by: Enzo Trapani
- Written by: Fulvio Palmieri
- Starring: Dino; Rosemary Dexter; Gianni Morandi
- Cinematography: Mario Montuori
- Edited by: Luciano Anconetani; Gabriella Vitale
- Music by: Ennio Morricone
- Production company: Tigielle 33
- Release date: September 2, 1965
- Running time: 97 minutes (1h 37min)
- Country: Italy
- Language: Italian

Altissima pressione (Italian: Highest Pressure) is a 1965 Italian musicarello comedy film directed by Enzo Trapani.

== Cast ==
- Dino as Roberto
- Gianni Morandi
- Rosemary Dexter as Serenella
- Fabrizio Capucci
- Lucio Dalla
- Nicola Di Bari
- Micaela Esdra as Lia
- Lilly Bistrattin as Gianna
- Anna Maria Checchi as Laura
- Léa Nanni as Daniela
- Maria Grazia Spina as Presentatrice
- Gianluca Amadio as Sandro
- Mauro Bronchi as Fausto
- Roberto Palmieri as Gigi
- Mimmo Poli as Il salumiere
- Françoise Hardy as herself

== Plot ==
A young and penniless songwriter named Roberto convinces a friend's father to invest into a new club. As this is done, the Caciotta Club gets created.

== Critics ==
The film got 4,5/10 on IMDb, and per Google, the film was liked by 60% of its users.

== Soundtrack ==
The soundtrack Tutti noi giovani was performed by Stelvia Ciani.
