= Erico Menczer =

Italian cinematographer

- Born: Erik Menczer; 8 May 1926; Fiume, Italy
- Died: 10 March 2012 (aged 85); Rome, Italy
- Occupation: Cinematographer
- Children: Filippo Menczer

Erico Menczer (8 May 1926 - 10 March 2012) was an Italian film cinematographer.

Born in Fiume (later Rijeka) as Erik, he was forced by the fascist phobia for the foreign culture to change his name. At the end of the Second World War, when the city of Fiume became Yugoslav, he first moved to Padua, then to Genoa, and finally to Rome, where he began his film career.

After having worked as a camera operator, Menczer made his debut as a cinematographer in 1960 with the comedy film Le pillole di Ercole directed by Luciano Salce, with whom he had a professional association that characterized his career in the following decades. He also worked, among others, with Federico Fellini, Mario Monicelli, Michelangelo Antonioni and Dario Argento.

== Filmography ==
- Gold of Rome (1961)
- The Pills of Hercules (1961)
- The Fascist (1961)
- Crazy Desire (1962)
- Of Wayward Love (1962)
- A Girl... and a Million (1962)
- The Hours of Love (1963)
- Outlaws of Love (1963)
- La vita agra (1964)
- The Reckless (1964)
- Sedotti e bidonati (1964)
- The Dirty Game (1965)
- The Young Nun (1965)
- How I Learned to Love Women (1966)
- Pleasant Nights (1966)
- Operation St. Peter's (1967)
- Assassination (1967)
- Massacre Mania (1967)
- Summit (1968)
- Machine Gun McCain (1968)
- Frame Up (1968)
- Beatrice Cenci (1969)
- I See Naked (1969)
- Shadow of Illusion (1970)
- The Cat o' Nine Tails (1971)
- Il caso Pisciotta (1972)
- Slap the Monster on Page One (1972)
- The Dead Are Alive (1972)
- Il sindacalista (1972)
- Fiorina la vacca (1973)
- Alla mia cara mamma nel giorno del suo compleanno (1974)
- Fantozzi (1975)
- Kidnap Syndicate (1975)
- Young, Violent, Dangerous (1976)
- Mister Scarface (1976)
- Il secondo tragico Fantozzi (1976)
- House of Pleasure for Women (1976)
- Holocaust 2000 (1977)
- Covert Action (1978)
- Eyes Behind the Stars (1978)
- Ombre (1980)
- Honey (1981)
- Vieni avanti cretino (1982)
