= I'll Sell My Skin Dearly =

1968 film

- Directed by: Ettore Maria Fizzarotti
- Written by: Giovanni Simonelli
- Cinematography: Stelvio Massi
- Music by: Enrico Ciacci; Marcello Marrocchi
- Release date: 1968
- Language: Italian

I'll Sell My Skin Dearly (Italian: Vendo cara la pelle) is a 1968 Italian Spaghetti Western film directed by Ettore Maria Fizzarotti.

== Cast ==
- Mike Marshall as Shane
- Michèle Girardon as Georgina Bennett
- Valerio Bartoleschi as Kristian
- Dane Savours as Ralph Magdalena
- Spartaco Conversi as Benson
