= Chimera (1968 film) =

- Directed by: Ettore Maria Fizzarotti
- Written by: Giovanni Grimaldi
- Starring: Gianni Morandi; Laura Efrikian; Nino Taranto; Katia Moguy; Clelia Matania; Gino Bramieri; Roberto Carlos
- Cinematography: Claudio Ragona
- Music by: Gian Franco Reverberi
- Release date: 1968
- Country: Italy
- Language: Italian

Chimera is a 1968 Italian musicarello comedy film directed by Ettore Maria Fizzarotti. The title is a reference to the Gianni Morandi's eponymous hit song.

== Cast ==
- Gianni Morandi: Gianni Raimondi
- Laura Efrikian: Laura Raimondi
- Nino Taranto: José Da Costa
- Katia Moguy: Maria Da Costa
- Clelia Matania: Lina, the maid
- Franco Giacobini: the sergeant
- Lino Toffolo: Sanmarco
- Carlo Taranto: Roberto Mendoza
- Tino Bianchi: the professor
- Enzo Cannavale: Hotel doorman
- Gino Bramieri: Mr. Krone-Luigi Brambilla
- Roberto Carlos: Carlos Roberto
- Pippo Franco: commilitone
