= Per amore... per magia... =

- Directed by: Duccio Tessari
- Screenplay by: Ennio De Concini; Duccio Tessari; Alberto Cavallone; Franco Migliacci
- Story by: Ennio De Concini
- Starring: Gianni Morandi; Rosemary Dexter; Mina; Rossano Brazzi; Sandra Milo
- Cinematography: Alfio Contini
- Edited by: Romano Trina
- Music by: Luis Enriquez Bacalov
- Production companies: Rizzoli Film; Vides Cinematografica di Franco Cristaldi; Films Ariane
- Distributed by: C.E.I.A.D. (Italy)
- Release date: 1967
- Countries: Italy; France
- Languages: English, Italian

Per amore... per magia... (transl. For Love... for Magic...) is a musicarello romantic comedy fantasy film directed by Duccio Tessari.

== Plot ==
Fantastic Middle Ages. Aladdin is a nice and penniless boy: like his sister Algisa he has no degree of nobility, but he is in love with the daughter of the Grand Duke of Forilarì, the beautiful princess Esmeralda, whom the Viscount of Pallerineri would like to marry, to take over the Duchy.

Aladdin, who for a living is a model in the tailor Jo Babà's atelier, was born on a moonless night and is therefore one of the few who can get to own the magic lamp containing the genie, which is located under a mysterious trap door in the woods of witches.

Even the princess loves Aladdin and this love gives him the strength to overcome any obstacle: the Viscount, the Maghreb magician, the charming Aichesiade, a strange penguin, the interrogation of the four wise men and other obstacles.

Aided only by his five inseparable friends and the genie of the lamp, he manages to make his dream come true, saving his sister from the executioner and giving freedom to the genie of the lamp.

== Cast ==
- Mina: Aichesiade
- Gianni Morandi: Aladdin
- Sandra Milo: Algisa
- Paolo Poli: Jo Babà
- Rosemarie Dexter: Esmeralda
- Mischa Auer: Grand Duke of Forilarì
- Daniele Vargas: Viscount of Pallerineri
- Gianni Musy Glori: Magrebino
- Harold Bradley: Hassan

== Release ==
Per amore... per magia... was first distributed in 1967. It was distributed by C.E.I.A.D. in Italy.
