= Laura Efrikian =

Italian-Armenian actress (born 1940)

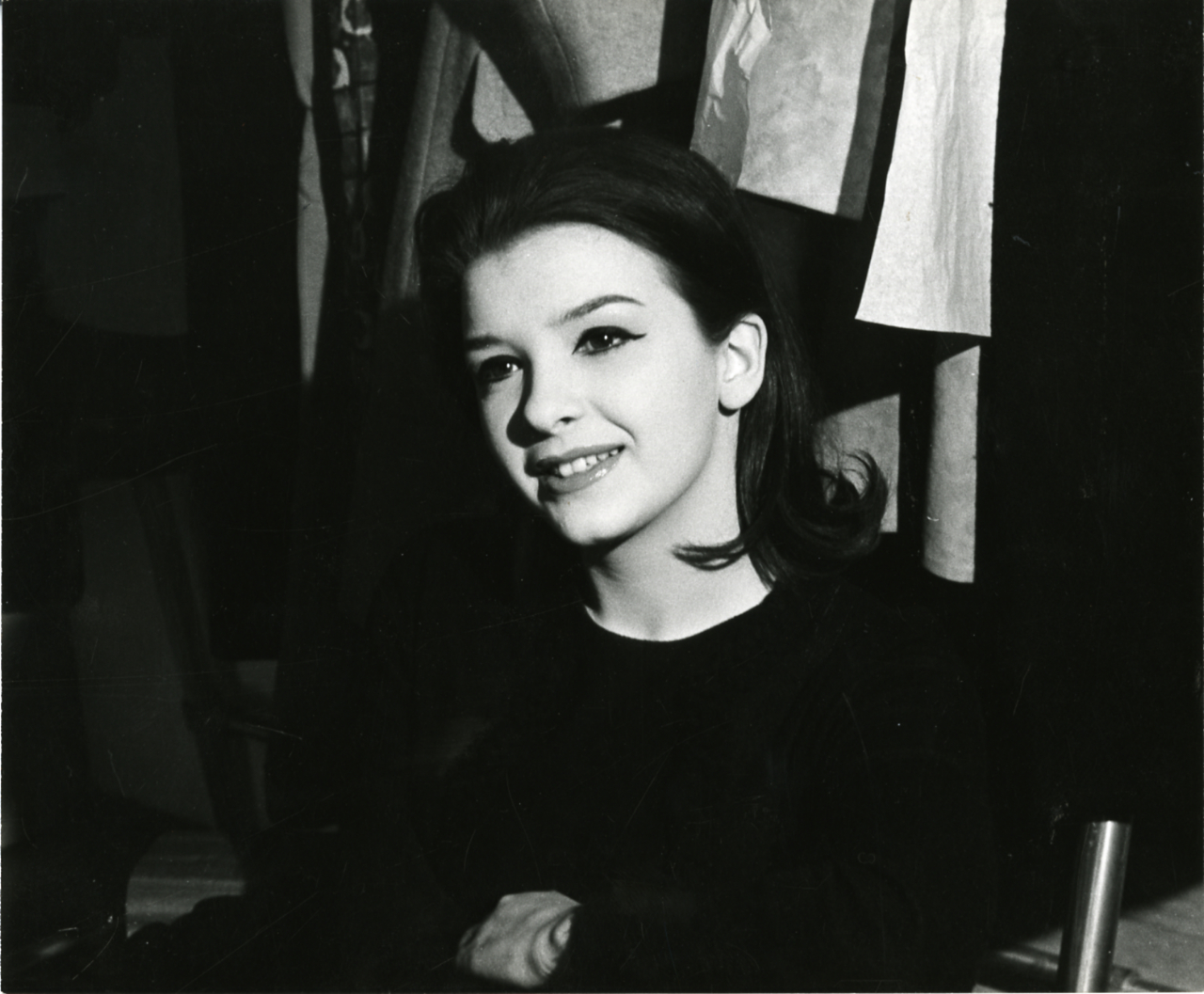
- Efrikian in 1965
- Born: Laura Ephrikian; 14 June 1940 (age 85); Treviso, Veneto, Kingdom of Italy
- Occupation: Actress
- Spouse: Gianni Morandi (m. 1966; div. 1979)
- Children: 2
- Father: Angelo Ephrikian

Laura Efrikian (Armenian: Լաուրա Էֆրիկյան; born Laura Ephrikian, 14 June 1940) is an Italian actress and television personality mainly active in the 1960s.

== Life and career ==
Born in Treviso as Laura Ephrikian, the daughter of the conductor and musicologist Angelo Ephrikian and of Armenian descent, Efrikian graduated in acting at the drama school of the Piccolo Teatro in Milan.

Since 1960 Efrikian intensively worked in theater, television and films, notably hosting the 1962 edition of the Sanremo Music Festival. After the film debut in the 1961 peplum film Hercules and the Conquest of Atlantis, Efrikian starred in several musicarelli films with Gianni Morandi, whom she married in 1966; the couple divorced in 1979.

She considers herself Roman Catholic.

== Selected filmography ==
- Hercules and the Conquest of Atlantis (1961)
- La Cittadella (1964)
- In ginocchio da te (1964)
- Tears on Your Face (1964)
- Non son degno di te (1965)
- Se non avessi più te (1965)
- The Young Nun (1965)
- Nessuno mi può giudicare (1966)
- Perdono (1966)
- Rita the Mosquito (1968)
- Chimera (1968)
- Things from Another World (2011)
