= Crazy Desire =

1962 film

- Directed by: Luciano Salce
- Written by: Castellano & Pipolo; Luciano Salce
- Starring: Ugo Tognazzi; Catherine Spaak
- Cinematography: Erico Menczer
- Music by: Ennio Morricone
- Release date: 24 March 1962
- Language: Italian

Crazy Desire (originally titled La voglia matta, also known as The Crazy Urge) is a 1962 Italian comedy film directed by Luciano Salce. It launched the film career of Catherine Spaak. The film initially was banned by the Italian censors and then cut in some parts and released with a ban for persons under 14 years.

== Plot ==
Antonio Berlinghieri (Ugo Tognazzi) is a 39-year-old engineer and father travelling on a highway one summer in his sports car when he sees a broken-down car with a group of teenagers. He stops to help them but soon discovers that the young men have a frivolous attitude. At first, he thinks of leaving to continue his trip but then notices the beauty of Francesca (Catherine Spaak), a fifteen-year-old girl. He decides to remain with the group to try to seduce or marry the girl, despite the difference in age.

== Cast ==
- Ugo Tognazzi as Ing. Antonio Berlinghieri
- Catherine Spaak as Francesca
- Gianni Garko as Piero
- Fabrizio Capucci as Enrico, Francesca's friend
- Luciano Salce as Bisigato
- Franco Giacobini as Carlo Alberghetti
- Béatrice Altariba as Silvana
- Jimmy Fontana as Jimmy
