= Vito Molinari =

Italian stage and film director (1929–2025)

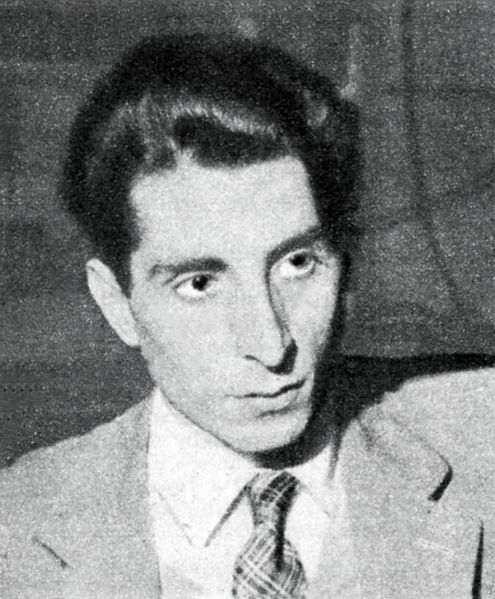
- Molinari in 1955
- Born: 6 November 1929; Sestri Levante, Italy
- Died: 18 February 2025 (aged 95); Lavagna, Italy
- Occupations: Stage director Film director

Vito Molinari (6 November 1929 – 18 February 2025) was an Italian stage and film director.

== Life and career ==
Born in Sestri Levante on 6 November 1929, Molinari made his debut as a film director in 1954 with his first production on the television channel RAI. He directed several TV series, including L'amico del giaguaro, Un due tre, and Canzonissima.

Molinari founded the theatre program at the University of Genoa alongside Francesco Della Corte. At the Teatro Lirico Giuseppe Verdi in Trieste, he directed a production of Die Fledermaus in 1965 and The White Horse Inn in 1970. At the Politeama Rossetti, he directed Die Csárdásfürstin which starred Adriana Innocenti and Elio Pandolfi. In December 2024, he received the Lifetime Achievement Award at the Premio Vincenzo Crocitti International.

Molinari died in Lavagna on 18 February 2025, at the age of 95.
