= Giovanni Narzisi =

Italian cinematographer and film director (1929-)

Giovanni Narzisi (born 2 February 1929) is an Italian cinematographer, director and screenwriter.

Born in Palermo, Narzisi started his career in the 1950s as cameraman and assistant cinematographer of Mario Bava and Massimo Dallamano. He debuted as cinematographer in 1962, with the war film Oggi a Berlino; after working to films such as The Grim Reaper (1962), Love Factory (1964) and The Subversives (1967), he wrote and directed two films, the Spaghetti Western Djurado (1966) and the commedia sexy all'italiana Maschio latino cercasi (1977), which were both panned by critics and unsuccessful at the box office.
