= Nino Taranto =

Italian actor

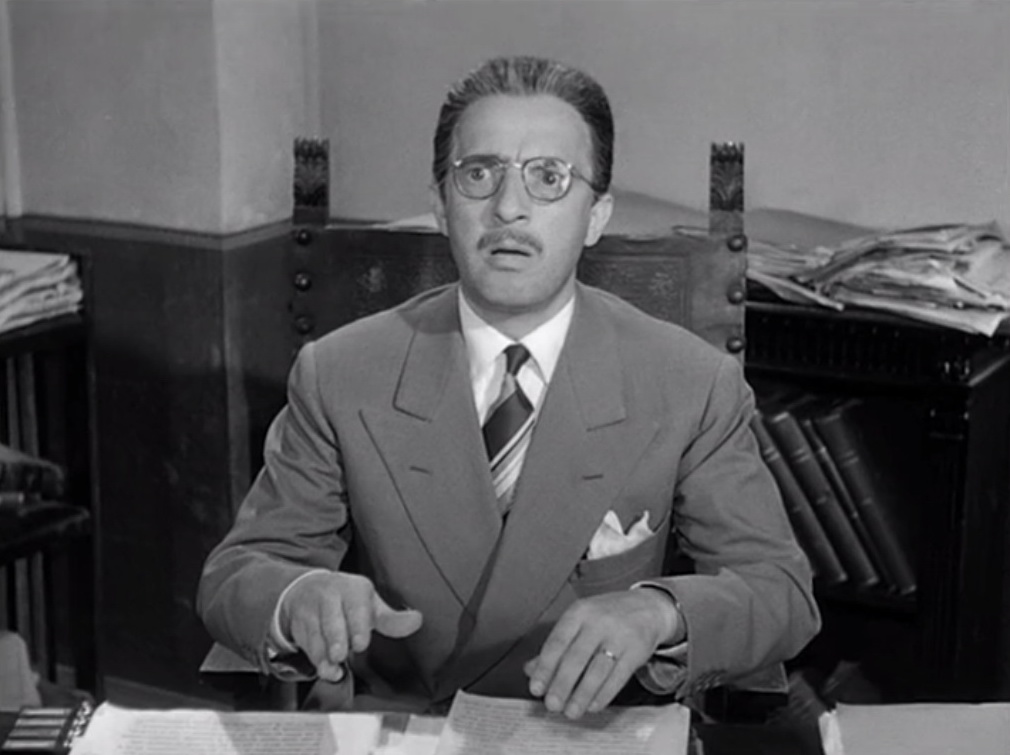
- Taranto in It Happened at the Police Station (1954)
- Born: 28 August 1907; Naples, Kingdom of Italy
- Died: 23 February 1986 (aged 78); Naples, Italy
- Occupation: Actor
- Years active: 1924–1971

Nino Taranto (28 August 1907 – 23 February 1986) was an Italian actor. He appeared in more than 80 films between 1924 and 1971.

== Life and career ==
Born in Naples, Taranto started his career as a child actor in 1918 starring in some local stage companies. After studying mime and dance he joined the company of Salvatore Cafiero. In 1928 he successfully entered into the sceneggiata genre: invited on tour in the United States, he returned with "a pianola tape and a thousand dollars", used to finance his first company of variety, which lasted only fifteen days and ended in total disaster. In 1933 he debuted on dramatic theater and in revue, a genre he focused until the 1950s.

Taranto achieved large notoriety thanks to two macchiette (i.e. comic musical monologues caricaturing stock characters), Ciccio Formaggio and Baron Carlo Mazza, two caricatural characters of proven success that he reprised several times during his career.

He debuted in cinema in 1938, but achieved some success just in the 1950s. In 1953 he won a Nastro d'Argento for Best Actor for his performance in Luigi Zampa's Anni facili. In the sixties he was several times sidekick of Totò in a number of successful comedies and starred in numerous musicarelli films.

Taranto also starred in a number of TV films, took part in several television and radio variety shows and recorded several songs. In 1985 RAI honored the artist with a monographic documentary series in four parts, Taranto Story.

On February 23, 1986, just five days before his 79th birthday, Taranto died in Naples from unknown disease. He is entombed at Poggioreale Cemetery, Naples.

== Filmography ==
- Vedi Napoli e poi muori (1924)
- Nonna Felicità (1938) - Nino Senesi
- A Lady Did It (1938) - Nino
- We Were Seven Widows (1939) - Orlando, il cameriere di bordo
- La canzone rubata (1940) - Alberto & il cantante Giacomo Albini
- Arcobaleno (1943)
- The Whole City Sings (1945) - Il maestro elementare
- Lo sciopero dei milioni (1947)
- Dove sta Zaza? (1947) - Il Napoletano e Il Americano
- Accidenti alla guerra!... (1948) - Michele Coniglio
- Baron Carlo Mazza (1948) - Barone Carlo Mazza
- Se fossi deputato (1949) - Angelino Angelini
- The Firemen of Viggiù (1949) - Himself
- I'm in the Revue (1950) - Pasquale - l'habilleur
- Cintura di castità (1950) - Il capocomico
- Tizio, Caio, Sempronio (1951) - Tizio
- Licenza premio (1951) - Domenico Errichiello
- Free Escape (1951) - Domenico Errichiello
- A Thief in Paradise (1952) - Vincenzo De Pretore
- The Piano Tuner Has Arrived (1952) - Achille Scozzella
- Easy Years (1953) - Prof. Luigi De Francesco
- Café chantant (1953) - Se stesso / Himself
- Of Life and Love (1954) - Bosco
- It Happened at the Police Station (1954) - Police Chief
- Milanese in Naples (1954) - Luigi Martiello
- Carousel of Variety (1955)
- La moglie è uguale per tutti (1955) - Avvocato Antonio De Papis
- Wives and Obscurities (1956) - Carmine Petriccone
- Arrivano i dollari! (1957) - Giuseppe Pasti
- Husbands in the City (1957) - Giuseppe Pasti
- Italia piccola (1957) - Vincenzo
- A sud niente di nuovo (1957)
- I prepotenti (1958)
- Mogli pericolose (1958) - Domenico Esposito
- Il bacio del sole (Don Vesuvio) (1958) - Raffaele Spada
- Mogli pericolose (1958) - Pirro
- Il terribile Teodoro (1958)
- Prepotenti più di prima (1959) - Domenico Esposito
- Avventura a Capri (1959) - Barone Vannutelli
- Ferdinando I, re di Napoli (1959) - The Prime Minister 'Tarantella'
- Caravan petrol (1960) - Ciro
- Totòtruffa 62 (1961) - Camillo
- Accroche-toi, y'a du vent! (1961) - Don Cicillo
- Pesci d'oro e bikini d'argento (1961)
- Che femmina!! E... che dollari! (1961)
- Toto vs. Maciste (1962) - Tarantakamen
- Lo smemorato di Collegno (1962) - Prof. Ademaro Gioberti
- Le massaggiatrici (1962) - Professor Gaspare Petroni
- I 4 monaci (1962) - Fra' Gaudenzio
- The Two Colonels (1963) - Sergente Quaglia
- Uno strano tipo (1963) - Cannarulo
- Totò contro i quattro (1963) - Giuseppe Mastrillo
- The Monk of Monza (1963) - Don Egidio, marchese de Lattanziis
- The Four Musketeers (1963)
- In ginocchio da te (1964) - Maresciallo Antonio Todisco
- Tears on Your Face (1964) - Giovanni Tudini
- Napoleone a Firenze (1964)
- Te lo leggo negli occhi (1965) - Gennaro
- Se non avessi più te (1965) - Ten. Antonio Todisco
- Non son degno di te (1965) - Antonio Todisco
- Dio, come ti amo! (1966) - Vincenzo Di Francesco
- Rita the Mosquito (1966) - Director of education
- Mi vedrai tornare (1966) - Nostromo Spampinato
- Perdono (1966) - Antonio Pezzullo
- Nessuno mi può giudicare (1966) - Antonio Pezzullo
- Stasera mi butto (1967) - Father of Marisa
- Nel sole (1967) - Physics Teacher
- Il ragazzo che sapeva amare (1967)
- L'oro del mondo (1968) - Filippo Pugliese
- Franco, Ciccio e le vedove allegre (1968) - Sacristan
- Chimera (1968) - José Da Costa
- Operazione ricchezza (1968)
- Il ragazzo che sorride (1969) - Filippo Leccisi
- Pensando a te (1969)
- Il suo nome è Donna Rosa (1969) - Antonio Belmonte
- Lisa dagli occhi blu (1970) - General
- Ninì Tirabusciò: la donna che inventò la mossa (1970) - Armando / Professor Vincelli
- Mezzanotte d'amore (1970) - Antonio
- Venga a fare il soldato da noi (1971) - Captain Re
