= Carlo Taranto =

Italian actor

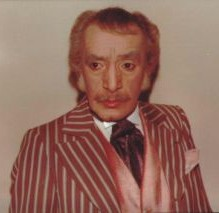
- Born: 18 October 1921; Naples, Kingdom of Italy
- Died: 4 April 1986 (aged 64); Naples, Italy
- Occupation: Actor
- Years active: 1949–1984

Carlo Taranto (18 October 1921 – 4 April 1986) was an Italian film actor. He appeared in 50 films between 1949 and 1984.

== Partial filmography ==
- The Firemen of Viggiù (1949)
- Assi alla ribalta (1954)
- Wives and Obscurities (1956) - Aiutante di Carmine
- Doctor and the Healer (1957) - Scaraffone
- Primo applauso (1957)
- I prepotenti (1958) - Numa
- Carmela è una bambola (1958) - Pasqualino
- Sorrisi e canzoni (1958)
- Ricordati di Napoli (1958) - Domenichino
- Avventura a Capri (1959) - Giovane operaio in piazzetta
- Lui, lei e il nonno (1959)
- La cento chilometri (1959) - Righetto
- La nipote Sabella (1959) - The porter in Salerno Railway Station
- Nel blu dipinto di blu (1959) - Remo
- Cerasella (1959) - Suonatore di mandolino
- Some Like It Cold (1960) - Cesarino
- Appuntamento a Ischia (1960) - Gennaro
- Caravan petrol (1960) - The Head of the Execution Squad
- Akiko em Roma (1961)
- The Last Judgment (1961)
- Don Camillo: Monsignor (1961) - Marasca, il marito di Gisella
- Pesci d'oro e bikini d'argento (1961) - Secondo ladro
- The Italian Brigands (1961) - O' Scaraffone
- Che femmina!! E... che dollari! (1961)
- Toto vs. Maciste (1962) - Consigliere Assiro
- The Four Monks (1962) - Il mafioso
- Divorzio alla siciliana (1963)
- In ginocchio da te (1964) - Serg. Scannapietra
- Made in Italy (1965) - Office employee (segment "4 'Cittadini, stato e chiesa', episode 1")
- Te lo leggo negli occhi (1965)
- Non son degno di te (1965) - Scannapieco
- How We Robbed the Bank of Italy (1966) - Pasquale
- Dio, come ti amo! (1966) - Taxi driver
- Perdono (1966) - Carlo
- Nessuno mi può giudicare (1966) - Carlo
- 7 monaci d'oro (1966) - Pasquale Volterra, detto "Vesuvio"
- Tears on Your Face (1967) - Chitarrista
- Nel sole (1967) - Giacomo
- Il ragazzo che sapeva amare (1967)
- L'oro del mondo (1968) - Cessionario
- Chimera (1968) - Roberto Mendoza
- The Nephews of Zorro (1968) - Cleptomane
- Operazione ricchezza (1968)
- Il ragazzo che sorride (1969) - Little hotel owner
- Il suo nome è Donna Rosa (1969) - Francesco - The butler
- Lisa dagli occhi blu (1970) - Inspector's helper
- Mezzanotte d'amore (1970) - Francesco - The butler
- The President of Borgorosso Football Club (1970) - The South American coach
- Figlio mio, sono innocente! (1978) - Don Pasquale
- Neapolitan Mystery (1979)
- Where's Picone? (1984) - Gannina
- Al limite, cioè, non glielo dico (1985)
