= Dolores Palumbo =

Italian actress (1912–1984)

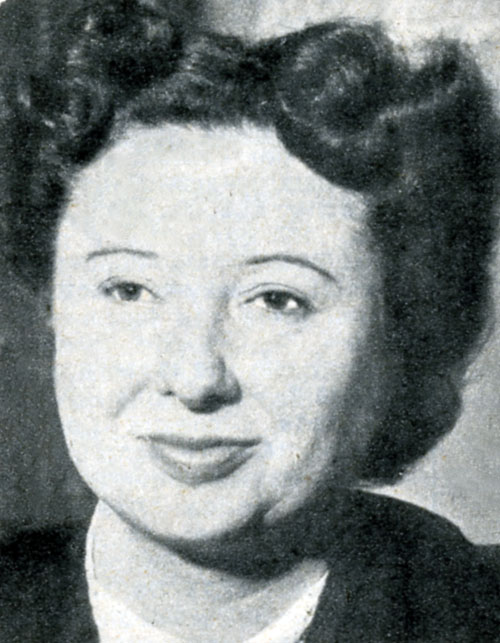
- Born: 14 June 1912; Naples, Kingdom of Italy
- Died: 30 June 1984 (aged 72); Naples, Italy
- Occupation: Actress

Dolores Palumbo (14 June 1912 – 30 January 1984) was an Italian stage and film actress.

== Life and career ==
Born in Naples, the daughter of two stage actors, Palumbo debuted in 1930 with a bit role in the farce La bella trovata. Shorty later she entered the stage company of Nino Taranto, with whom she starred in a number of successful revues. In 1945 she joined the stage company of Eduardo De Filippo and she was critically appreciated for her performance in the comedy play Napoli milionaria. Two years later she rejoined the company of Nino Taranto until the 1950s, then, in 1955, she worked again with Eduardo De Filippo, who called her in his company to replace his sister Titina. Palumbo was also very active in films, mainly of comic genre.

== Selected filmography ==
- In the Country Fell a Star (1939)
- Non ti pago! (1942)
- Lorenzaccio (1951)
- Neapolitan Carousel (1954)
- Poverty and Nobility (1954)
- Milanese in Naples (1954)
- Oh! Sabella (1957)
- Lazzarella (1957)
- Husbands in the City (1957)
- Angel in a Taxi (1958)
- Three Strangers in Rome (1958)
- Legs of Gold (1958)
- I motorizzati (1962)
- Liolà (1963)
- In ginocchio da te (1964)
- Tears on Your Face (1964)
- Non son degno di te (1965)
- Se non avessi più te (1965)
- Sgarro alla camorra (1973)
