= TuttoTotò =

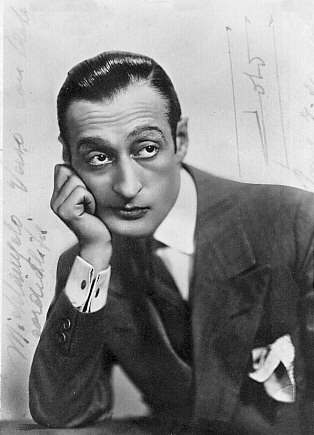
- Antonio De Curtis, a.k.a. Totò (signed photograph, 1925)
- Genre: Comedy
- Created by: Daniele D'Anza; Totò; Bruno Corbucci; Mario Amendola
- Directed by: Daniele D'Anza
- Starring: Totò; Mario Castellani; Piero Mazzarella; Lauretta Masiero
- Country of origin: Italy
- Original language: Italian
- No. of seasons: 1
- No. of episodes: 9

Production
- Running time: 50 mins (each episode)

Original release
- Network: RaiUno, Italy
- Release: 4 May – 6 July 1967

TuttoTotò ('AllTotò') is an Italian television series in 9 episodes Totò produced in 1967, during the last few months of his life. His intention was to recycle for the small screen all those theatre sketches he had interpreted in his golden years. The series aired posthumously.

== Plot ==
Each episode, which lasts about 50 minutes long, has its own logical thread; but the element that makes it funny and interesting is the infinite collection of sketches that Toto had created during his theatrical career that was then included in the films.

== Episodes ==
The list is proposed according to the order of distribution in the Italian television.

- Il latitante (The fugitive) - 4 May 1967
- Il tuttofare (The handyman) - 10 May 1967
- Il grande maestro (The great master) - 13 May 1967
- Don Giovannino - 18 May 1967
- La scommessa (The bet) - 23 May 1967
- Totò Ciak! - 8 June 1967
- Totò a Napoli (Totò in Naples) - 13 June 1967
- Totò Ye-Ye - only 3 October 2007
- Premio Nobel (Nobel Prize) - 6 July 1967

=== Il latitante ===
Toto is a thief who cannot do anything honest. At the end of his latest prison sentence, he is released and promises the governor of the prison that in future he will behave like a model citizen. Instead, Toto immediately thinks of a new way to scam people. He pretends to be the old school friend of a stranger, telling him he needs to stay for a few days in his house, giving the excuse that he has run over a pedestrian with his car. With this trick he deceives several men, until the police arrest him and take him back to prison.

=== Il tuttofare ===
Toto is looking for work, and at the job he is offered the role of cleaner guy in a beauty salon. The barber is an eccentric man who claims the maximum effort from Toto, and when he is absent at the moment, Toto receives customers posing himself as the barber, creating much troubles.

=== Il grande maestro ===
The master Mardocheus Stonatelli loves the music, but he is very poor. His wife thinks he's crazy, because there is a serious job. One day, however, the situation changes and Mardocheus receives the invitation to direct the band in a small town in Apulia. Mardocheus goes in the hostel, but only has a free room that is rented out to three people! The three men have to live in the room all night and fight, until the day of the party arrives, and Mardocheus is preparing to conduct, in his bizarre way, the band.

=== Don Giovannino ===
Barnabas, said Don Giovannino, is a true lover of beautiful women. One day he chases a beautiful American in his apartment, taking advantage of the fact that her husband is in Rome for a process. However, the husband comes home, and Barnabas is forced to pretend crazy. In his second love affair, Barnabas comes at a clothing store. Inadvertently also in this case the husband of the beautiful girl wgoes back and so Barnabas pretends to be a mannequin with clothes. Eventually Barnabas decides to give up women, and when the opportunity presents himself, he beats a beautiful girl.

=== La scommessa ===
Oberdan is very shy with women and his employer, to help him and to fire him, makes sure that Oberdan has a love affair in a nightclub. Oberdan, came into the room, tries to stay calm, but in the end he is seduced. However, although his employer fires him, Oberdan finds a new job in light club.

=== Totò Ciak! ===
Toto participates in various samples in a study of cinema, first going in a studio where there's shooting a spy movie, then in a western scenario, where he has to play a cruel and uncouth bandit who must challenge him to a duel a cowboy.

=== Totò Ye-Ye ===
Toto is a musician of the Piper Club of Rome who attends a concert run by young girls who love the typical music of the sixties. Indeed, Toto feels himself like a fish out of water, because he is a man of the past. However Toto eventually decides to convert to the world of "hippies", and creates for him a band staff. After a fight, Toto is brought to the police station, and has a lively and entertaining exchange with the Commissioner, who decides to throw him in jail for insanity. Meanwhile, in the club, are continuing the carefree songs.

=== Totò a Napoli ===
Toto presents his beloved city with the original poems written by him. Subsequently, Toto starts doing unlicensed tour guide of the city, tricking foreign tourists. Finally Toto stops in a bar and meets a beautiful American girl with whom he begins to converse. The goalkeeper of the bar gets upset with Toto, because he is indebted to him for sixty thousand lire. The girl decides to do the favor to Toto, paying the debt, but eventually Toto and the bartender, when the girl goes away, discover that the money is fake.

=== Premio Nobel ===
Professor Serafino Bolletta is a bizarre inventor, who has just invented a pipe which saves on smoking and health: the PPCIP-18. Serafino for this discovery is awarded in Stockholm, and he has to go by train from Rome to receive the honor. By train, Serafino meets the Honourable Cosimo Trombetta which starts a fight for possession of the bunk. At the end of the dispute, a beautiful woman steals two the berth, while the wife of Serafino, who is watching the interview from Rome with her husband, sees Serafino taking secretly together with the beautiful girl of the train.

== See also ==
- List of Italian television series
