= Ettore Maria Fizzarotti =

Italian film director and screenwriter

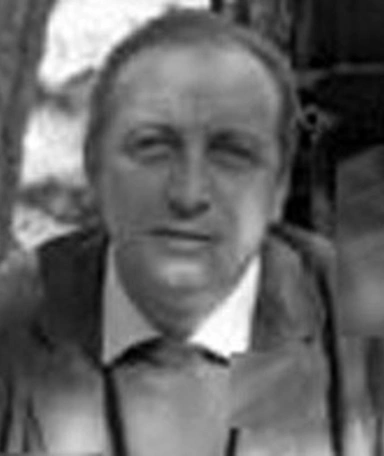
- Born: 3 January 1916; Naples, Kingdom of Italy
- Died: 10 September 1985 (aged 69); Rome, Italy
- Occupation: Film director
- Years active: 1946–1972

Ettore Maria Fizzarotti (3 January 1916 – 10 September 1985) was an Italian film director and screenwriter.

Born in Naples, the son of the director Armando, he debuted as assistant director in the films of his father, and later collaborated with, among others, Vittorio Cottafavi and Raffaello Matarazzo. He made his directorial debut in 1964, with In ginocchio da te, a musicarello with Gianni Morandi which was panned by critics but which got a large commercial success. Fizzarotti then directed several films of the same genre, starring some of the most important Italian singers of the time. His career also include the spaghetti Western I'll Sell My Skin Dearly and Sgarro alla camorra, the first sceneggiata film, which marked the film debut of Mario Merola.

== Selected filmography ==
- Naples Is Always Naples (1954)
- In ginocchio da te (1964)
- Tears on Your Face (1964)
- Se non avessi più te (1965)
- Non son degno di te (1965)
- Perdono (1966)
- Nessuno mi può giudicare (1966)
- Mi vedrai tornare (1966)
- Stasera mi butto (1967)
- Soldati e capelloni (1967)
- Vendo cara la pelle (1968)
- Chimera (1968)
- Il suo nome è Donna Rosa (1969)
- Mezzanotte d'amore (1970)
- Angeli senza paradiso (1970)
- Venga a fare il soldato da noi (1971)
- Sgarro alla camorra (1973)
