= Musicarello =

Italian film sub genre; musical comedy typically featuring a young singing star

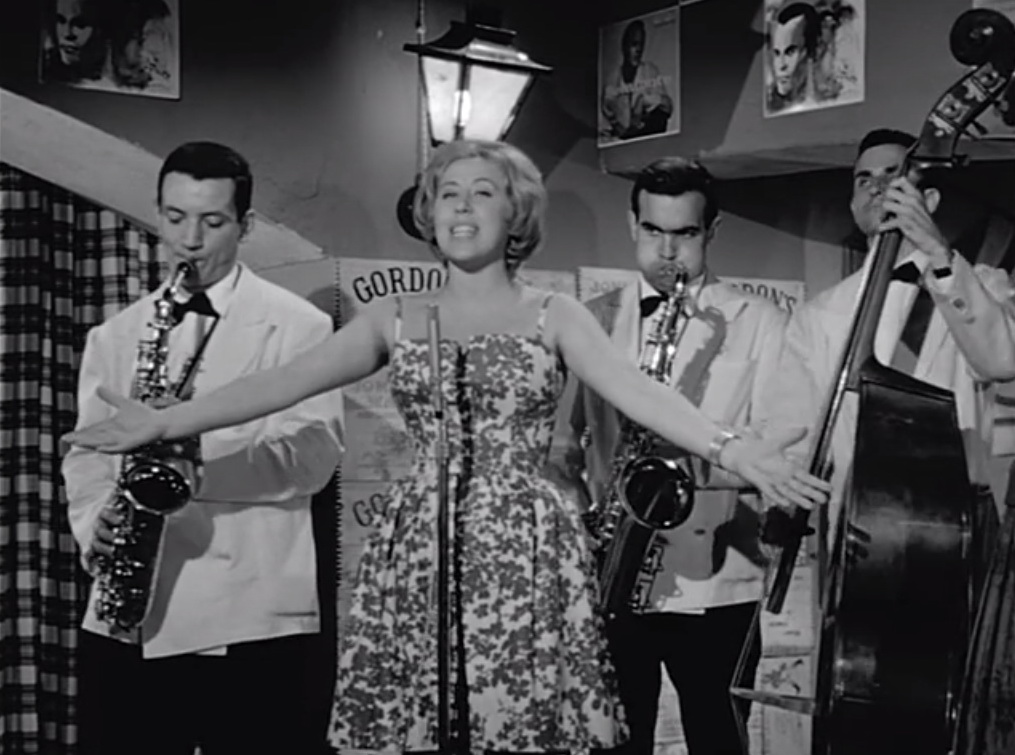
Betty Curtis in Ragazzi del Juke-Box (1959) by Lucio Fulci

The musicarello (pronounced [muzikaˈrɛllo]; pl.: musicarelli) is a film subgenre which emerged in Italy and which is characterised by the presence in main roles of young singers, already famous among their peers, and their new record album. In the films there are almost always tender and chaste love stories accompanied by the desire to have fun and dance without thoughts. Musicarelli reflect the desire and need for emancipation of young Italians, highlighting some generational frictions. The genre began in the late 1950s, and had its peak of production in the 1960s.

== Name ==
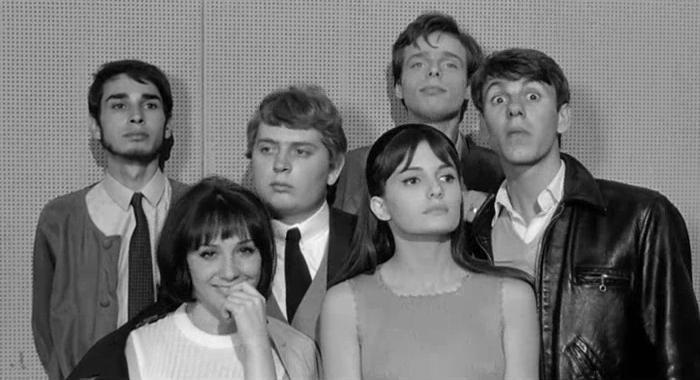
Highest Pressure (1965) by Enzo Trapani

According to critics, the name musicarello is a reference to the successful TV series Carosello. In particular, the name musicarello combines the words musica ("music") and Carosello: in fact, the singers who were the protagonists of the musicarelli, thanks to their notoriety, often appeared in many episodes of TV series Carosello.

== Background ==
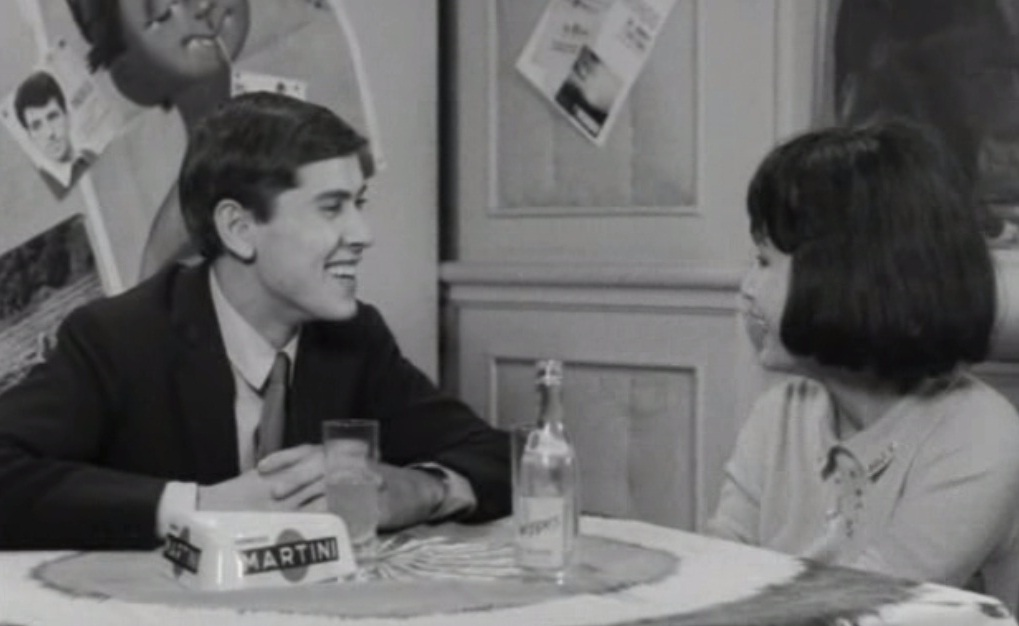
Mi vedrai tornare (1966) by Ettore Maria Fizzarotti

The genre began in the late 1950s, and had its peak of production in the 1960s. The film which started the genre is considered to be I ragazzi del Juke-Box (1959) by Lucio Fulci. The musicarelli were inspired by two American musicals, in particular Jailhouse Rock (1957) by Richard Thorpe and earlier Love Me Tender (1956) by Robert D. Webb, both starring Elvis Presley.

One of the pioneering films of the musicarelli was the version for the Italian market of the American musical film Go, Johnny, Go! (1959) by Paul Landres starring Jimmy Clanton, Chuck Berry, Ritchie Valens and Eddie Cochran, released in Italy as Vai, Johnny vai!. Some sequences were inserted from scratch in the film with the Italian singer Adriano Celentano who introduces and concludes the story by playing some of his songs.

== Characteristics ==
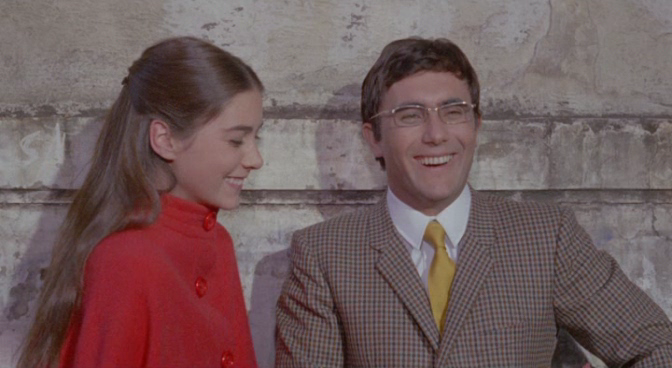
Al Bano and Romina Power in Nel sole (1967) by Aldo Grimaldi

Musicarello is characterised by the presence in main roles of young singers, already famous among their peers, and their new record album. At the heart of the musicarello is a hit song, or a song that the producers hoped would become a hit, that usually shares its title with the film itself and sometimes has lyrics depicting a part of the plot.

Musicarello can be defined as the forerunner of the music video, a way of bringing teenagers to the cinema attracted by the plot as by the singers' performances. In fact, the films are born from agreements between record companies and film companies. In the films there are almost always tender and chaste love stories accompanied by the desire to have fun and dance without thoughts.

Unlike most film musicals, this subgenre has an evident age-based focus while musical films until that time had been produced in a way generally undifferentiated for tastes and ages, musicarello is explicitly targeted to a youthful audience and usually has in its plot a vague polemic against conformism and bourgeois attitudes, even if it does not fail to reflect the desire and need for emancipation of young Italians, highlighting some generational frictions.

The genre was referred to as a curious mix between fotoromanzi, traditional comedy, hit songs and tentative references to tensions between generations. The key figures in this genre were directors Piero Vivarelli and Ettore Maria Fizzarotti, and actor-singers Gianni Morandi, Little Tony, Rita Pavone and Caterina Caselli.

== Decline and end of the genre ==
With the arrival of the 1968 student protests the genre started to decline, because the generational revolt became explicitly political and at the same time there was no longer a music equally directed to the whole youth audience. For some time the duo Al Bano and Romina Power continued to enjoy success in musicarello films, but their films (like their songs) were a return to the traditional melody, and to the musical films of the previous decades.

== Notable films ==
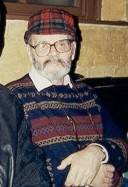
Lucio Fulci in 1994

- Ragazzi del Juke-Box by Lucio Fulci (1959)
- Juke box urli d'amore by Mauro Morassi (1959)
- Appuntamento a Ischia by Mario Mattoli (1960)
- Urlatori alla sbarra by Lucio Fulci (1960)
- 5 marines per 100 ragazze by Mario Mattoli (1961)
- Appuntamento in riviera by Mario Mattoli (1962)
- Tears on Your Face by Ettore Maria Fizzarotti (1964)
- Questo pazzo, pazzo mondo della canzone by Bruno Corbucci and Giovanni Grimaldi (1965)
- Soldati e caporali by Mario Amendola (1965)
- Highest Pressure by Enzo Trapani (1965)
- Non son degno di te by Ettore Maria Fizzarotti (1965)
- Questi pazzi, pazzi italiani by Tullio Piacentini (1965)
- Rita, la figlia americana by Piero Vivarelli (1965)
- Viale della canzone by Tullio Piacentini (1965)
- Te lo leggo negli occhi by Camillo Mastrocinque (1965)
- Mi vedrai tornare by Ettore Maria Fizzarotti (1966)
- Rita the Mosquito by George Brown (Lina Wertmüller) (1966)
- Perdono by Ettore Maria Fizzarotti (1966)
- Se non avessi più te by Ettore Maria Fizzarotti (1966)
- Nessuno mi può giudicare by Ettore Maria Fizzarotti (1966)
- Cuore matto... matto da legare by Mario Amendola (1967)
- The Crazy Kids of the War by Steno (1967)
- Io non protesto, io amo by Ferdinando Baldi (1967)
- Stasera mi butto by Ettore Maria Fizzarotti (1967)
- Rita of the West by Ferdinando Baldi (1967)
- Nel sole by Aldo Grimaldi (1967)
- Don't Sting the Mosquito by George Brown (Lina Wertmüller) (1967)
- Per amore... per magia... by Duccio Tessari (1967)
- TuttoTotò (1967) by Daniele D'Anza
- Peggio per me... meglio per te by Bruno Corbucci (1967)
- Soldati e capelloni by Ettore Maria Fizzarotti (1967)
- Chimera by Ettore Maria Fizzarotti (1968)
- L'oro del mondo by Aldo Grimaldi (1968)
- The Most Beautiful Couple in the World by Camillo Mastrocinque (1968)
- Io ti amo by Antonio Margheriti (1968)
- Pensando a te by Aldo Grimaldi (1969)
- Pensiero d'amore by Mario Amendola (1969)
- Zingara by Mariano Laurenti (1969)
- Il ragazzo che sorride di Aldo Grimaldi (1969)
- Il suo nome è Donna Rosa by Ettore Maria Fizzarotti (1969)
- W le donne di Aldo Grimaldi (1970)
- Mezzanotte d'amore by Ettore Maria Fizzarotti (1970)
- Angeli senza paradiso by Ettore Maria Fizzarotti (1970)
- Ma che musica maestro by Mariano Laurenti (1971)

== See also ==
- Cinema of Italy
- Music of Italy
- Musical film
