= Caterina Caselli =

Italian record producer, music executive, and musician

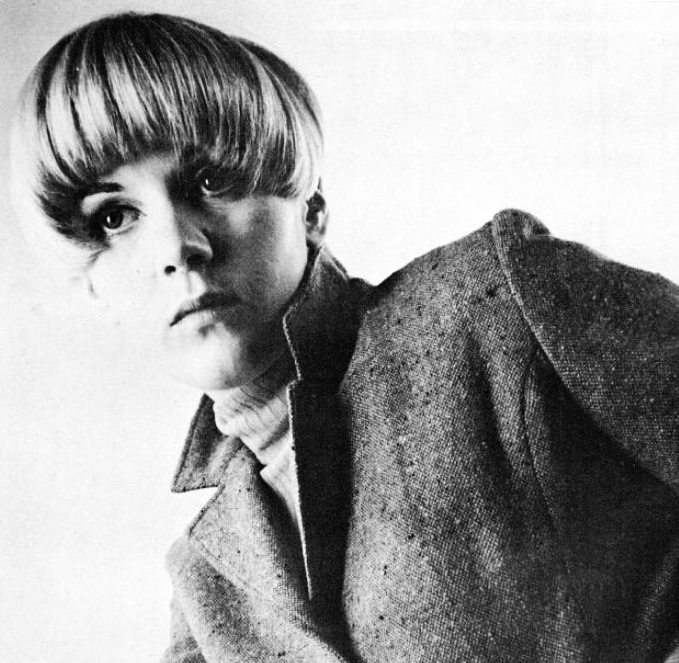
- Caselli in 1967

Background information
- Born: 10 April 1946 (age 79); Modena, Italy
- Occupations: Singer; musician; record producer
- Instruments: Vocals; bass
- Label: Sugar Music

Caterina Caselli (born 10 April 1946) is an Italian singer, bass player, record producer and music executive.

== Biography ==
Caselli was born in Modena but grew up in nearby Sassuolo. She started her music career by playing bass in local clubs.

In 1966 she debuted in the Sanremo Festival with "Nessuno mi può giudicare", a song originally offered to and subsequently discarded by Adriano Celentano. It sold over one million copies, and was awarded a gold disc. Caselli also had considerable success with an Italian cover of the David McWilliams song "Days of Pearly Spencer" called "Il volto della vita". Her first album, Casco d'oro ('Golden Bob'), was titled after a nickname given to her by the music press. In 1966 she scored another domestic hit with the song "Perdono". She topped the Italian charts again with "Sono bugiarda", a remake of The Monkees's song "I'm a Believer" (1967).

In 1968 Caselli enjoyed further success with a "Il Carnevale" and a dynamic version of the Paolo Conte-penned tune "Insieme a te non ci sto più". Caselli would later record a new version of the song for the soundtrack of the Michele Soavi's neo-noir film The Goodbye Kiss in 2006, winning the David di Donatello Award for Best Song.

In 1970 she married Piero Sugar, head of her music label CGD. Caselli started working with her husband, eventually becoming president of Sugar Music, and retired from her performing career. She discovered and produced artists such as Andrea Bocelli, Giuni Russo, Elisa, Negramaro and Piccola Orchestra Avion Travel. Caselli and Sugar's son Sugar is the current CEO of the label.

In 1983 she was lured out of retirement when she agreed to record "Amico è" with Dario Baldan Bembo. The song peaked at number 5 in the Italian charts.

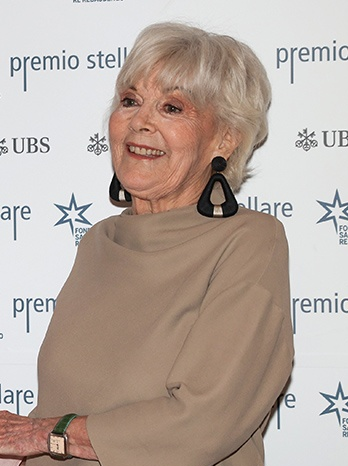
Caselli at the Fondazione Sandretto Re Rebaudengo in Turin, 2025

Caselli was a guest on the fourth night of the Sanremo Music Festival 2026, where she was handed a special lifetime achievement award.

== Discography ==
- 1966 - Casco d'oro (CGD, FG 5029)
- 1967 - Diamoci del tu (CGD, FG 5033)
- 1970 - Caterina Caselli (CGD, FGS 5080)
- 1972 - Caterina Caselli (CGD, FGL 5105)
- 1974 - Primavera (CGD, 69071)
- 1975 - Una grande emozione (CGD, 69121)
- 1990 - Amada mia (Sugar Music 508100-1)
