= Vittorio Congia =

Italian actor (1930–2019)

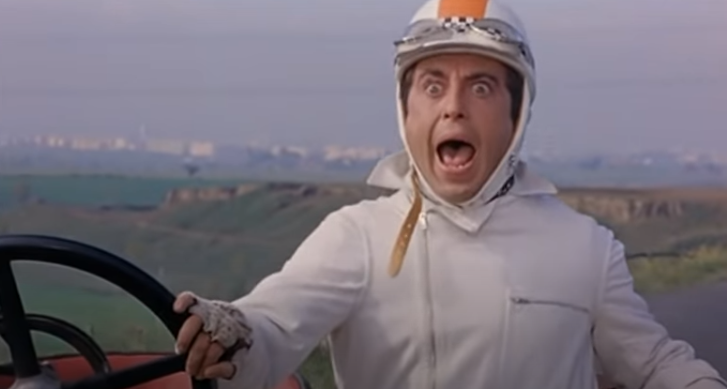
- Congia in Gerarchi si muore (1962)
- Born: 4 November 1930; Iglesias, Italy
- Died: 26 November 2019 (aged 89); Trevignano Romano, Italy
- Occupations: Actor; voice actor
- Years active: 1957–2014

Vittorio Congia (4 November 1930 – 26 November 2019) was an Italian film actor and dubber. He appeared in 40 films between 1957 and 1978. He was born in Iglesias, Sardinia, Italy.

== Selected filmography ==
- La Bottega del Caffè (1960)
- Sua Eccellenza si fermò a mangiare (1961)
- 5 marines per 100 ragazze (1962)
- Shivers in Summer (1963)
- Obiettivo ragazze (1963)
- In ginocchio da te (1964)
- Gli amanti latini (1965)
- Rita the Mosquito (1966)
- The Cat o' Nine Tails (1971)
