= Paolo Panelli =

Italian actor

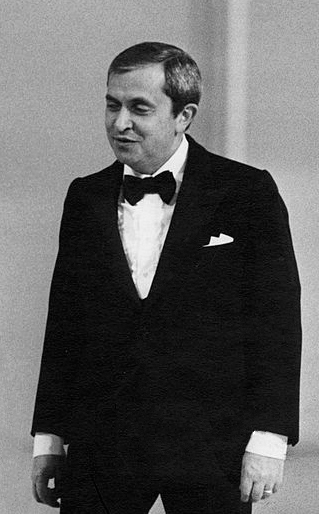
- Paolo Panelli in 1959
- Born: 15 July 1925; Rome, Italy
- Died: 18 May 1997 (aged 71); Rome, Italy
- Occupation: Actor
- Years active: 1948–1992
- Spouse: Bice Valori (m. 1952; died 1980)
- Relatives: Michele Valori (brother-in-law)

Paolo Panelli (15 July 1925 – 18 May 1997) was an Italian comedian and film actor. He appeared in 55 films between 1948 and 1996. He was married to Bice Valori.

== Selected filmography ==
- Guarany (1948)
- Arrivederci, papà! (1948)
- Vertigine d'amore (1949)
- Flying Squadron (1949) - Allievo
- Against the Law (1950) - Tremolino
- Hearts at Sea (1950) - Leone - un allievo ufficiale
- Paris Is Always Paris (1951) - Nicolino Percuoco
- The Last Sentence (1951) - Michele
- Wife for a Night (1952) - Gualteri
- Solo per te Lucia (1952) - Tonino Moriconi
- I Chose Love (1953)
- Voice of Silence (1953)
- Scampolo 53 (1953)
- Laugh! Laugh! Laugh! (1954) - Innamorato litigioso
- Bella, non piangere! (1955) - Il soldato balbuziente
- Submarine Attack (1955)
- La moglie è uguale per tutti (1955) - Vincenzo
- Folgore Division (1955)
- I pinguini ci guardano (1956)
- Terrore sulla città (1957)
- I dritti (1957) - Peppino, il barista
- Le dritte (1958) - Ercole Scatola
- Mia nonna poliziotto (1958) - Ernesto
- Tough Guys (1960) - Hercule Robinot
- Le signore (1960) - Attilio Brando
- I Teddy boys della canzone (1960) - Paolino
- The Assassin (1961) - Paolo
- Akiko (1961) - Felice
- Cronache del '22 (1961)
- The Shortest Day (1962) - (uncredited)
- Siamo tutti pomicioni (1963) - The Sicilian Husband (segment "Pomicioni di provincia")
- I marziani hanno 12 mani (1964) - X1
- I Kill, You Kill (1965) - Marchese Achille Pozzuoli (segment "La danza delle ore")
- Amore all'italiana (1966) - Ettore / l'arbitro / Amleto
- Me, Me, Me... and the Others (1966) - Photographer
- Rita the Mosquito (1966) - Peppino
- Perdono (1966) - Aldo - father of Federico
- Gli altri, gli altri... e noi (1967)
- Zum Zum Zum - La canzone che mi passa per la testa (1969) - Paolo
- Zum zum zum n° 2 (1969) - Nane'
- Gli infermieri della mutua (1969) - Alvaro il benzinaio
- Nel giorno del Signore (1970) - Cliente osteria
- Mezzanotte d'amore (1970) - Paolo De Barberis
- Count Tacchia (1982) - Alvaro Puricelli
- Sing Sing (1983) - Augusto Mastronardi (first story)
- Questo e Quello (1983) - Doctor (segment "Quello... col basco rosso")
- Grandi magazzini (1986) - Evaristo's father
- Quelli del casco (1988)
- Splendor (1989) - Signor Paolo
- Towards Evening (1990) - Galliano, the hairdresser
- Parenti serpenti (1992) - Grandfather Saverio
