= Maria Valentina Tonelli =

Italian pharmacist, essayist and editor

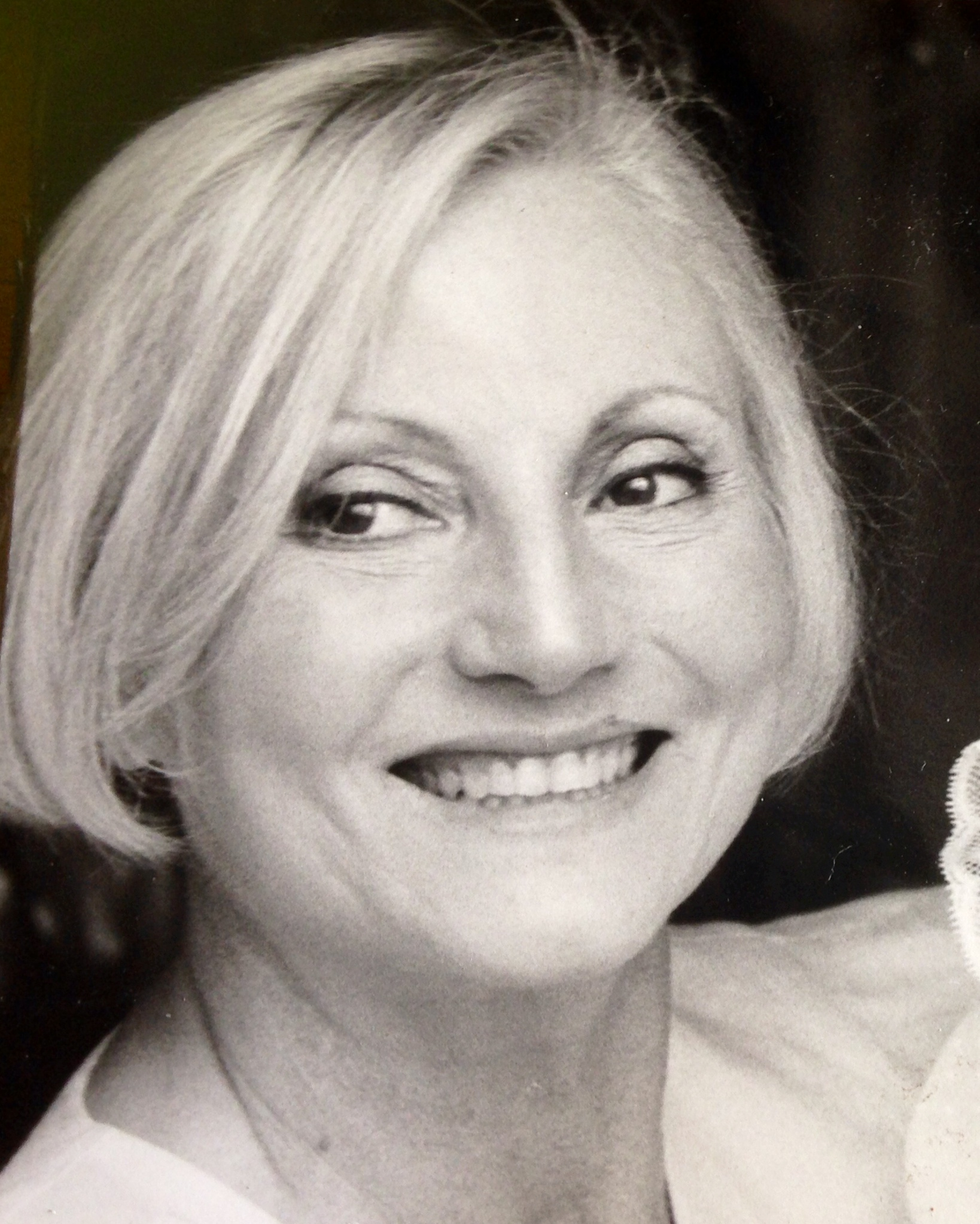
Maria Valentina Tonelli Valori

Maria Valentina Tonelli (16 April 1939 – 9 February 2016) was an Italian pharmacist, essayist and editor.

== Biography ==
Maria Valentina Tonelli was born in Rome, 16 April 1939. She graduated from Sapienza University in Rome with a degree in Pharmacy in 1963. With her choice of degree, she followed in the footsteps and traditions of her family, but in doing so she did not abandon her passion for writing, which she pursued through her research into testimonies and diaries.

A descendant of the ancient Buffa di Perrero family, she edited various volumes of family memoirs.

Her husband was the architect and urban planner Michele Valori. She expressed a similar commitment in her conservation of the artistic and intellectual work of Michele Valori, which she was able to collect and pass on to the rich archive acquired in 2007 by the Italian Ministry of Cultural Heritage and Activities for the collection of MAXXI Architecture. However, the story of the reassembling of Michele Valori's private archive actually began as early as 1980, as Tonelli realised the importance of acknowledging his indisputable skills with a complete collection. With perseverance and determination, she was able to recover all her husband's papers, both professional and academic, from across his studios and their home.

In this way, she succeeded in reconstructing a body of documentary information of great value to the Italian architectural scene, and which was extremely significant in terms of the memories it encompassed and the affection it showed.

In 1995, the archive of Michele Valori's projects and writings was declared of historical interest by the Archival Superintendency of Lazio, who described it as "a precious resource for the history of architecture and urbanism in Italy".

It was thanks to the generous donation of Maria Valentina Tonelli and her daughters Giovanna, Paola and Francesca that MAXXI Architecture received the entire archive in 2007, catalogued and digitised in line with the archival standards of the Museum in order to facilitate consultation and promote historical research.

Always committed to supporting and promoting cultural initiatives, putting it at the forefront of the sector alongside the great cultural and artistic institutions, in 2011 the museum founded the Michele Valori Association, which it will lead with tenacity and firmness, sensitivity and passion, until 2016.

Maria Valentina Tonelli died in Rome from an incurable illness on 9 February 2016, leaving her daughter Paola to continue her work on the conservation of Michele Valori's memory, thought and works.

As per her wishes, she is buried next to her husband in the family tomb in Monterotondo cemetery in Rome.

== Published works ==
- In 1997, she published "Posta fatta in casa" (Gangemi Editore)
- In 2011, she published "Virginia Buffa: storia di una donna delusa in amore nel sogno nascente della patria", a memoir of her great grandmother Virginia Buffa di Perrero, born in 1835 in Cairo Montenotte (Savona), joint testimony with her brother Gaspare Buffa (poet and philosopher, childhood friend of Cesare Abba) on the extraordinary event that was the Italian Risorgimento, Calosci publishers (Special prize at the national "Villa Morosini" competition, essays section (2011)).
- In 2013, she published "Aldo Valori. Il fascista che non amava il regime ", with a preface by Sergio Romano, published by Editori Riuniti.
- In 2012, she produced the exhibition Michele Valori_Abitare le case at Ca' Zenobio degli Armeni for the Venice Biennale of Architecture.
- In 2013, the same exhibition was presented in Rome at the MAXXI Architecture Archives Centre, where 35 new designs from the Torre Spagnola projects (Matera 1954) and the INA Casa Project (Civita Castellana 1950) were shown, alongside the forty original designs, photographs, models, archive video interviews and testimonies on the impact of his work.

Maria Valentina Tonelli documented this exhibition with the publication of the volume "Architectural Notebooks", a collection of writings by her husband alongside testimonies, travel and visual notes from the years 1949 to 1979. A story in images followed by testimonies from those who knew and respected him, prominent figures such as Leonardo Benevolo, Masolino, D'Amico, Federico Gorio, Arnaldo Bruschi, Giulio Andreotti. The volume won the literary essay prize "Locanda del Doge" and was shortlisted for the Nabokov Prize.

- In 2014, she received a plaque from the province of Matera for the construction of the Borgo de La Martella (1951 to 1954), "with great respect and deep admiration for the memory of Michele Valori for his significant professional and research activities in the fields of urban planning and civil engineering, some of which were carried out in this area".
