= Gostoli =

Gostoli is an Italian surname. Notable people with the surname include:

- Francesco Gostoli (born 1946), Italian architect
- Stefano Maria Benvenuti Gostoli (born 1976), Italian politician
