= Michele Valori =

Italian urban designer and architect

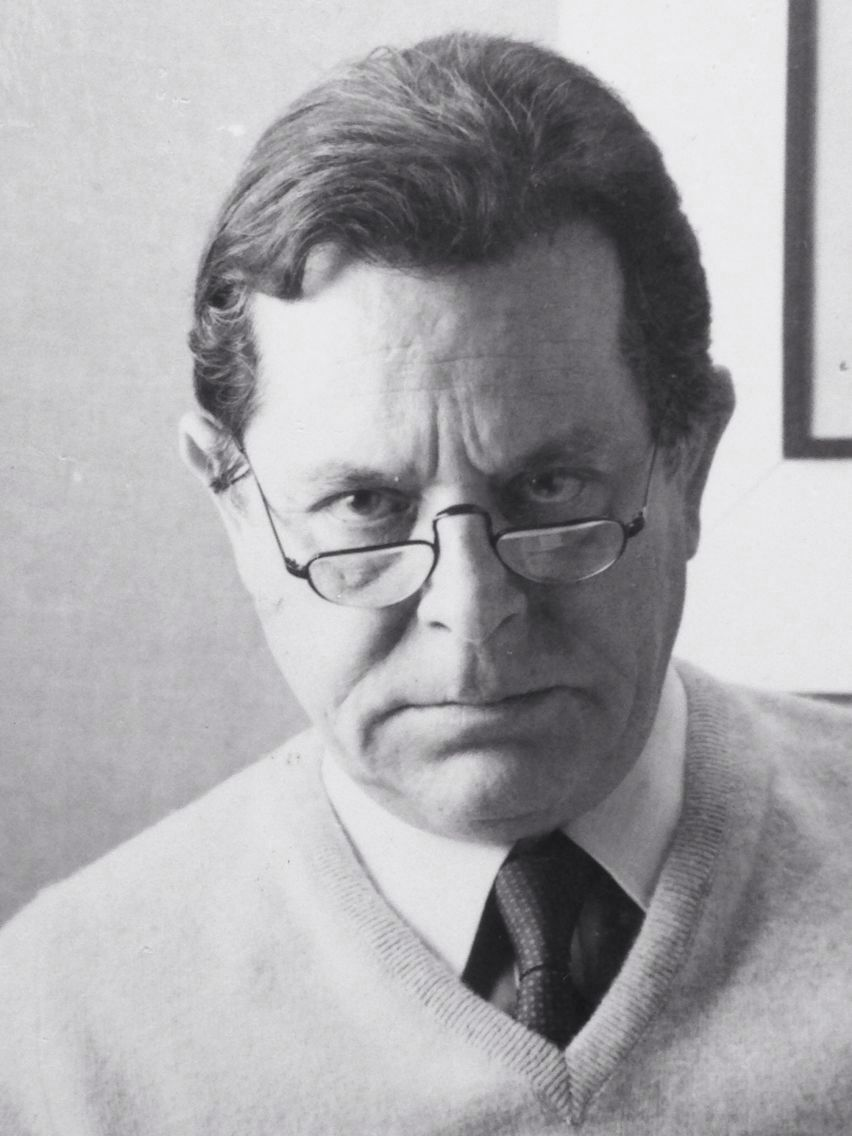
Michele Valori

Michele Valori (Bologna, 23 June 1923 – Rome, 16 October 1979) was an Italian urban designer and architect.

== Biography ==
Son of author and journalist Aldo Valori and brother of famous actress Bice Valori, Michele Valori graduated with a degree in Architecture in Rome in 1948.

Professor and Director of the University Institute for Urban Planning at the Faculty of Architecture in Rome, he was intensely active professionally and in research, in the fields of architectural design, urban planning and civil engineering, a fact evidenced by the vast number of works he completed and the many studies and research projects that he undertook.

Winner of many competitions for Urban Master Plans and public works, throughout his professional life he was called on to work with various public and private companies that were investing in the construction of homes and associated services. Valori displayed a significant commitment to culture, underlined by the awards and certificates he received in Italy and abroad, as well as prestigious appointments, including as a member of the Consiglio Superiore dei lavori Pubblici (Superior Council of Public Works).

This commitment characterised his work, which matured within the field of architectural Neorealism. In June 1962, he was appointed to collaborate with the municipal offices on the preparation of a Master Plan to be adopted by the city council on December 18, 1962, and approved by the government on December 16, 1965. Mario Fiorentino, Piero Maria Lugli, Vincenzo Passarelli and Luigi Piccinato worked with him on this project.

Valori's professional activity included close and fruitful exchanges with many prominent personalities in Rome and Milan; he mainly worked on public commissions, following a university education marked by direct participation in international modern culture and subscription to the Associazione per l'architettura organic – APAO (Association for organic architecture), founded by Bruno Zevi.

In the sphere of urban planning, his projects involving volumetric plans and his studies for tourist villages and suburban areas are particularly interesting; they characterised a field of research between architectural design and territorial planning, between the precision of technical culture and the search for a correct project planning. Over time, a deep intellectual tension developed around these themes, made explicit in his criticism of the Rome Master Plan, and painfully formulated in Valori's famous article "Fare del proprio peggio" ("Do your worst") published in the journal "Urbanistica" ("Urban Planning") in 1959: "Rome risks finding itself in twenty years' time with the same problems it has today, aggravated by an enormous increase in both construction and population. The most horrendous, discredited city in the world, which we will call Rome only out of pitiful convention, due to a phonetic habit."

Of great interest today is Valori's work in proposing a confrontation with the themes of the post-war architectural debate: in fact, almost a single unique theme played out on countless occasions, often in collaboration with other architects who worked with great efficacy in Italy between 1950 and 1980, in an effort to combine research and attention to emerging issues with an understanding of the profession deeply tied to reality. Valori died suddenly in 1979, five months before his sister Bice, leaving some of his works unfinished. He left behind many theoretical writings (essays, lectures, travel notes, personal letters), which his wife Maria Valentina Tonelli collected and passed onto the rich archive that was acquired for the collection of MAXXI Architecture in 2006. They represent a unitary body of great documentary value, which allows a more complex reading of his design activities, and which anticipates today's most topical subjects, such as the restoration of historic centres and environmental issues.

== Works ==
The archive containing all Michele Valori's works is at the National Museum of 21st Century Art (MAXXI) in Rome.

== See also ==
- Michele Valori Archive
- Architecture of the 20th century
- Neorealism in architecture
- Aldo Valori – father
- Maria Valentina Tonelli – wife
- Paolo Valori – brother
- Bice Valori – sister

== Bibliography ==
- Michele Valori, Voce: "Michele Valori", fifth appendix of the Treccani Italian Encyclopedia.
- Archives, MAXXI Architecture, Archivio Michele Valori, record in "AAA Italia. Bulletin n.9/2010", pages 44–45, May 2010.
