= The Cursed Medallion =

- Italian: Il medaglione insanguinato (Perche?)
- Directed by: Massimo Dallamano
- Screenplay by: Antonio Troisio; Raoul Katz; Tonino Cervi
- Story by: Franco Marotta; Massimo Dallamano; Laura Toscano
- Produced by: Fulvio Lucisano; William Reich
- Starring: Richard Johnson; Joanna Cassidy; Ida Galli; Nicoletta Elmi; Edmund Purdom; Lila Kedrova
- Cinematography: Franco Delli Colli
- Edited by: Antonio Siciliano
- Music by: Stelvio Cipriani
- Production companies: Italian International Film; Magdalena Produzione
- Distributed by: Italian International Film
- Release date: 22 May 1975 (Italy)
- Running time: 95 minutes
- Country: Italy
- Languages: Italian; English
- Box office: ₤178.075 million

The Cursed Medallion (Italian: Il medaglione insanguinato (Perche?), lit. 'The Blood-Stained Medallion (Why?)'; also released as The Night Child and Together Forever) is a 1975 Italian horror film directed by Massimo Dallamano, and starring Richard Johnson, Joanna Cassidy, Ida Galli, Edmund Purdom, Nicoletta Elmi and Lila Kedrova.

== Plot ==
Michael Williams, a documentary filmmaker for the BBC, is working on a project involving depictions of Satan and demonic-inspired deaths in works of art. His wife perished in what was ruled an accidental fire, and he now raises his preadolescent daughter, Emily, with assistance from a devoted governess, Jill, both of whom are still haunted by the death. Michael's obsession with a specific painting sends him to Italy, and his family doctor suggests Michael take his daughter and governess along to help them recover. While packing for the trip, Emily finds a medallion that he had bought for his wife on a previous trip, and in turn, he allows her to keep it. On arriving in Italy, they are met by American production manager Joanna, who soon becomes romantically drawn to Michael.

When Michael meets with art historian and self-professed psychic Countess Cappelli, she begs him not to inquire further about the painting, but to no avail. After an initial shoot at an abandoned gallery where the painting resides, the developed film shows what seems to be an ectoplasmic presence the crew had not seen when they shot it. When Michael and Joanna return late at night to figure out why this happens, Emily has a nightmare of them in danger, and concurrent with her hysterics, a statue falls, almost killing the couple. The rubble reveals a double-edged sword and a duplicate of Emily's medallion, previously hidden inside. Emily's behavior, in general, becomes more unpredictable, such as taking up smoking and playing piano when she previously had little skill, and unpleasant, particularly towards Joanna. The Countess warns of danger to everyone based on these discoveries and a tarot reading, but Michael dismisses her worry.

Joanna, sensing that governess Jill has also harbored feelings for Michael, tries to foster conviviality by taking everyone out for an afternoon of play in a cliffside park. The initially pleasant outing turns tragic when an unseen assailant pushes Jill off the cliff to her death in the rapid water below. Michael and Emily return to England for Jill's funeral, with the Countess begging them not to return. Emily also asks not to be taken back to Italy, but Michael intends to finish his documentary and solve the mystery of the painting. In their absence, the Countess returns to the gallery. She discovers someone has painted over elements of the painting that revealed a young girl resembling Emily possessing the sword and the medallion and has a vision of Michael pounding on the gallery's doors. She also has a vision of a girl playing piano and hiding letters in its body from another time. She uncovers an abandoned piano and finds the letters still there.

Returning to Italy, Michael asks Joanna to stay with them to keep watch on Emily. He meets with the Countess once more, and she shows him the letters, which detail how the girl in her vision, named Emilia, succumbed to demonic possession and killed her family. She urges him to get to Emily if he hopes to save her. Meanwhile, in full throes of a possession spurred by the medallion, Emily tries to kill Joanna by starting a fire in her bedroom with heating oil. Michael arrives in time to stop the fire, but Emily runs off during his save of Joanna. Emily gets into the gallery and is horrified to discover that she is responsible for the deaths of both her governess and her mother; she takes the sword and stabs the painting in manic terror. Michael finds her, and Emily runs to embrace him, seemingly unaware she holds the double-edged sword, which kills them.

== Cast ==
- Richard Johnson as Michael Williams
- Joanna Cassidy as Joanna Morgan
- Ida Galli as Jill Perkins
- Nicoletta Elmi as Emily Williams
- Edmund Purdom as the Doctor
- Lila Kedrova as Contessa Cappelli
- Riccardo Garrone as Police Inspector
- Dana Ghia as Emily's mother
- Eleonora Morana as the maid
- Aristide Caporale as Nazareno
- Tom Felleghy as Michael's boss

== Production ==
The Cursed Medallion was originally titled La bambina e il suo diavolo [Emily] (lit. 'The Little Girl and Her Devil–Emily'). It had a story written by the husband and wife writing team of Franco Marotta and Laura Toscano along with director Massimo Dallamano. It was one of several Italian genre films starring English actor Richard Johnson.

Shooting for the film started on October 28, 1974. The film was shot in Spoleto, Villa Parisi, Palazzo Chigi and London. Some sources state that the film was an Italian and British co-production, but the films companies involved who officially produced it were Italian.

== Release ==
The Cursed Medallion was released in Italy as Il medaglione insanguinato (Perché?!) on 22 May 1975 where it was distributed by Italian International Film. It was released in the United States in March 1976. The film has had the English-language titles The Night Child and The Cursed Medallion.

In 2005 the film was restored and shown as part of the retrospective "Homage to Fulvio Lucisano" at the 62nd Venice International Film Festival.

== See also ==
- List of Italian films of 1975

== Works cited ==
- Curti, Roberto (2017). Italian Gothic Horror Films, 1970-1979. McFarland. ISBN 978-1476629605.
