= Tough Guys (1960 film) =

- Directed by: Camillo Mastrocinque
- Written by: Oreste Biancoli; Leo Chiosso; Dino Verde
- Produced by: Luigi Carpentieri; Ermanno Donati
- Starring: Fred Buscaglione; Totò; Paolo Panelli; Scilla Gabel
- Cinematography: Luciano Trasatti
- Edited by: Roberto Cinquini
- Music by: Coriolano Gori
- Production company: CEI Incom
- Distributed by: CEI Incom
- Release date: 24 February 1960
- Running time: 102 minutes
- Country: Italy
- Language: Italian

Tough Guys (Italian: Noi duri) is a 1960 Italian comedy film directed by Camillo Mastrocinque and starring Fred Buscaglione, Totò, Paolo Panelli and Scilla Gabel.

== Cast ==
- Fred Buscaglione as Fred Bombardone
- Paolo Panelli as Hercule Robino
- Scilla Gabel as Josette
- Lynn Shaw as Monique
- Linda Sini as Barbara
- Totò as The Algerian
- Mario Castellani as Alì
- Elio Pandolfi as Serafino Alvarez y De Garcia
- Luigi Pavese as Custom man
- Giuseppe Porelli as Inspector Vichy
- Toni Ucci
- 5 Asternovas
- Marisa Ancelli
- Peppino De Martino
- Ignazio Dolce
- Giulio Marchetti
- Gino Ravazzini : director French TV
- Gianni Solaro
- Graziella Tolusso
- Romano Villi as Pat O'Guarda
- Ciccio
- Bice Valori as Genzianetta
- Fortunato Arena as Gangster
- Luciano Bonanni as Killer
- Andrea Petricca
- Nello Appodia as Algerian's henchman stabbed

== Bibliography ==
- Forgacs, David & Gundle, Stephen. Mass Culture and Italian Society from Fascism to the Cold War. Indiana University Press, 2007.
