= Michele Valori archive =

The Michele Valori archive, which has been declared as an item of great historical interest (“a precious resource for the history of architecture and urbanism in Italy”), was acquired for MAXXI’s collections in 2006 by the Ministry of Cultural Heritage and Activities. It documents the architect’s professional activity between the years of 1949 and 1979 and is a testament to his involvement in debates surrounding architecture and town planning in Italy. Available to scholars and the general public, the archive is made up of more than 2,700 designs for over 100 projects, kept in files and tubes that are methodically sorted and subdivided, and supporting diagrams such as surveys and maps. It also includes more than 5,000 photographic items such as negatives, photographic plates, and dispositive (photographic slides and transparencies), amongst which are teaching materials, documentation of travel and construction sites and prints. It also includes writings on architecture and urban planning, correspondence, travel notes, diaries, and audiovisual materials. The writings are particularly useful for understanding Valori’s work and its commitment to urban development, particularly in relation to the environment and territorial transformation processes.

== Organisation ==
Five archival strands have been identified:

- Professional activity: documenting the activity of Michele Valori and his studio in Italy and abroad between 1949 and 1979, through designs, models and photographs
- Educational and cultural activity: writings, reports, interviews and studies, as well as lecture and speech notes for the conferences and round tables in which he participated, nationally and internationally, on topics such as urbanism and planning.
- Photographic and audiovisual materials: photographic plates, diapositives, photographs of project papers, maps and plans of towns and building sites.
- Correspondence: private letters, sorted by year from 1950 to 1961
- Cartography and printed materials: maps of Rome, Milan and other cities, aerial photographs and tables produced by IGM (Istituto Geografico Militare / Military Geographical InstItute), magazines and extracts relating primarily to urbanism and associated topics.

== Conservation ==
The conservation of the Michele Valori Archive started with the conditioning of all the materials held by the MAXXI Museum, using tubes, envelopes and itemised files.

== Related entries ==
- MAXXI National Museum of 21st Century Art
- Michele Valori
- Maria Valentina Tonelli
