= Mia nonna poliziotto =

- Directed by: Steno
- Written by: Vittorio Metz; Roberto Gianviti; Steno
- Produced by: Felice Felicioni
- Starring: Tina Pica
- Cinematography: Sergio Pesce
- Music by: Carlo Innocenzi
- Distributed by: Variety Distribution
- Release date: 1958
- Language: Italian

Mia nonna poliziotto (i.e. "My Grandma a Policewoman") is a 1958 Italian comedy film directed by Steno and starring Tina Pica.

== Plot ==
The old grandmother Tina arrives in town to attend the wedding of his nephew Alberto with his girlfriend Ileana.

Upon arrival, she discovers that a medallion that her late husband had given her has been stolen.

She goes to the police station to file a complaint and get the dear object back, but given the length of the investigation, she decides to carry out the search for the thief herself, combining a great deal of mess.

Eventually, by chance, she finds the thief, who lives in the same hotel, also managing to have an entire gang of criminals arrested.

The grandson Alberto can marry the beautiful Ileana and the grandmother Tina will be appointed, by merit, an honorary colonel of the female police.

== Cast ==
- Tina Pica as Grandma Tina
- Mario Riva as Mario Secchioni
- Lyla Rocco as Ileana
- Alberto Lionello as Alberto
- Bice Valori as Francesca
- Alberto Talegalli as Maresciallo Speranza
- Riccardo Billi as Belletti
- Ugo Tognazzi as Ugo
- Raimondo Vianello as Raimondo
- Paolo Panelli as Paolo
- Diana Dei as Ileana's Sister
- Dante Maggio as Ileana's Father
- Luigi Pavese as Police Commissioner
- Loris Gizzi as Primary
- Silvio Bagolini as Gustavo Peretti
- Anna Campori as The Landlord
- Enzo Garinei as Gattinelli

== See also ==
- List of Italian films of 1958
