= Nicoletta Elmi =

Italian actress (born 1964)

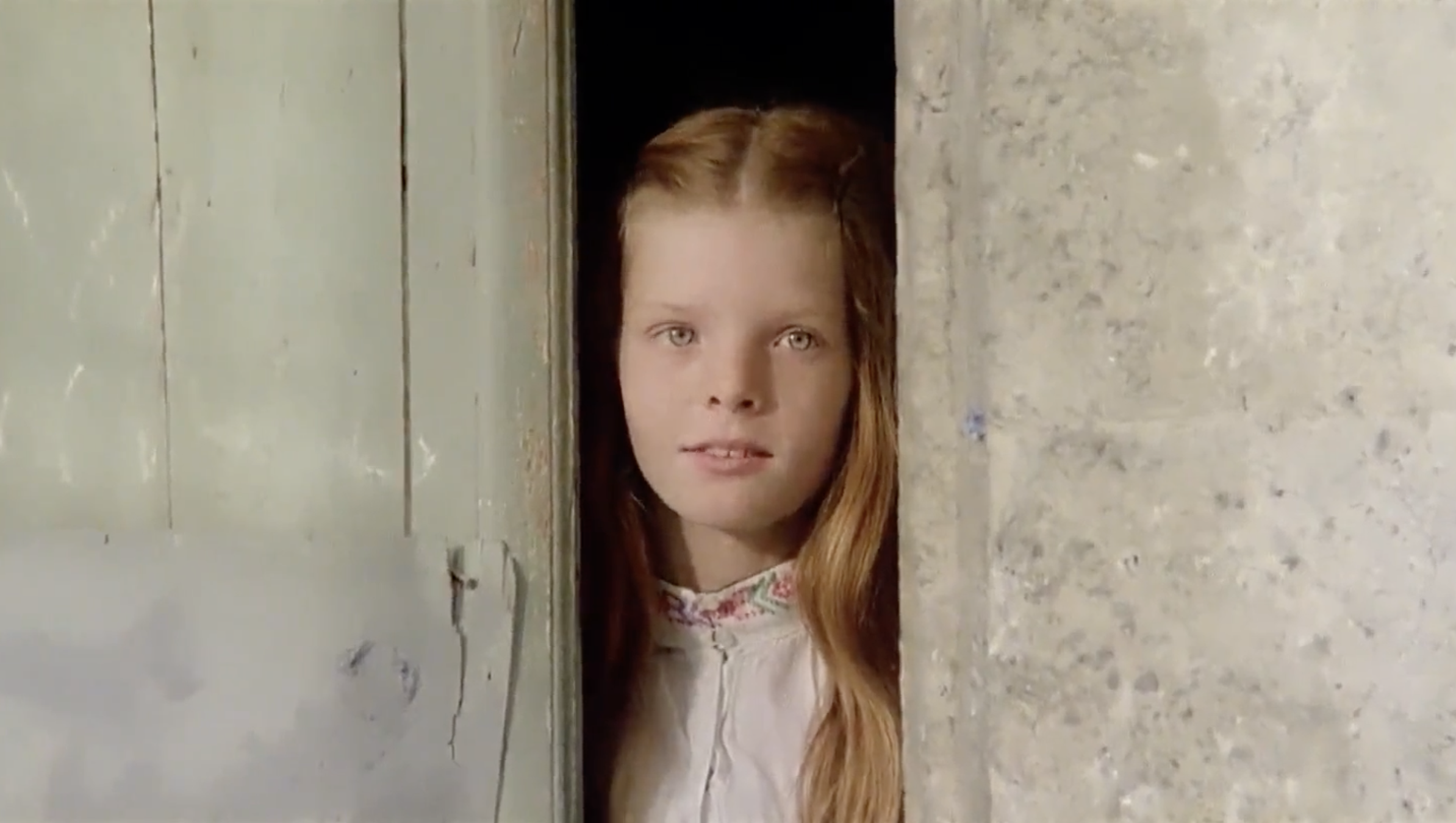
- Elmi in Deep Red (1975)
- Born: 13 February 1964 (age 62); Rome, Italy
- Other name: Nicole Elmi
- Occupation: Actress
- Years active: 1969–1988

Nicoletta Elmi (born 13 February 1964) is an Italian former actress. She appeared in many films in the 1970s as a child actress, but also appeared in several roles in adulthood in the 1980s. She is known to genre film audiences for her role in several giallo and horror films.

== Career ==
She is best known for (but not limited to) a series of roles as a child in Italian horror films, especially the giallo subgenre. Her film career started in 1969 with an uncredited appearance in Le Sorelle (Italian for The Sisters), followed later in the same year by an appearance as Rosy in Ettore Maria Fizzarotti's musicarello Il suo nome è Donna Rosa (Italian for Her Name is Donna Rosa), a role she reprised the following year in the sequel Mezzanotte d'amore (Italian for Midnight of love). In 1971, she made an uncredited appearance as the little girl at the table in Luchino Visconti's Death in Venice. In 1971, she made an uncredited appearance as the unnamed daughter of Renata and Albert (Claudine Auger and Luigi Pistilli respectively) in Mario Bava's A Bay of Blood. Also in 1971, she made another uncredited appearance as Mary, the daughter of the main characters Salvatore and Carmela Lo Coco in Steno's Gang War (Cose di Cosa Nostra in the Italian release). In 1972, she played the role of Gretchen Hummel in another Mario Bava film, Baron Blood. In the 1972 release Who Saw Her Die?, directed by Aldo Lado and Vittorio De Sisti, she played Roberta (the one that dies, to which the title refers), the daughter of George Lazenby's character Franco Serpieri. In 1973, she made an uncredited appearance as the character Virginia in Luciano Salce's comedy Io e lui (Italian for Me and him). In 1974, she played the role of Marika/Monica, Baron Frankenstein's daughter, in Flesh For Frankenstein. In 1975, she played the character Paula (Paola in the Italian release) in Luigi Bazzoni's Footprints on the Moon, the same year, she appeared in the role of Olga in Dario Argento's Deep Red. In 1975, she played the titular role in Massimo Dallamano's The Night Child (also known as The Cursed Medallion). The final film of the first segment of her career was Aldo Scavarda's only film as a director, the World War II drama Stream Line (La linea del fiume was the Italian title), in which she played Graziella Torretti, acting alongside Philippe Leroy and John Hurt.

After a career break during her teenage years, she went on to appear in several film and TV roles as an adult, including a return to the horror genre in Lamberto Bava's Demons in 1985. However, the previous year, she appeared in two comedies: the Carlo Vanzina-directed romantic comedy Amarsi un po'... in the role of Amanda Orselli, alongside Tahnee Welch and Virna Lisi, and the Claudio Risi-directed Windsurf - Il vento nelle mani (Italian for The wind in his hands) in which she played the character of Alice, again acting with Philippe Leroy, with whom she had appeared in Stream Line. From 1987 to 1988, she played the part of Benedetta Valentini in the TV series I ragazzi della 3ª C, which was also directed by Claudio Risi, with whom she had worked on Windsurf three years previously. Following this, she quit acting to become a speech therapist.

== Filmography ==
=== Cinema ===
- Le Sorelle, 1969
- Il suo nome è Donna Rosa, 1969
- Mezzanotte d'amore, 1970
- Death in Venice, 1971
- A Bay of Blood, directed by Mario Bava (1971)
- Who Saw Her Die?, 1971
- Gang War, 1971
- Baron Blood, directed by Mario Bava (1972)
- Io e lui, 1973
- Flesh For Frankenstein, directed by Paul Morrissey (1974)
- Deep Red, directed by Dario Argento (1975)
- Footprints on the Moon, 1975
- The Cursed Medallion, 1976
- Stream Line, 1976
- Amarsi un po', 1984
- Windsurf - Il vento nelle mani, 1984
- Demons, directed by Lamberto Bava, produced by Dario Argento (1985)

=== Television ===
- I ragazzi della 3ª C - TV series, as Benedetta Valentini (1987-1988)
