= ILAUD =

Architecture school in Italy

ILAUD (or I.L.A. & U.D. International Laboratory of Architecture and Urban Design) is the acronym for International Laboratory of Architecture and Urban Design. Founded by Giancarlo De Carlo in 1976 on the same concepts that led to the founding of Team X. The laboratory in 27 years of existence has accepted some of the most prestigious international architects, often personal friends and colleagues of the director Giancarlo De Carlo (among others Alison and Peter Smithson, Sverre Fehn). Bringing students from around the world to think and design in Italy. The ILAUD took place in a systematic way each year during the summertime in some of the most picturesque Italian city such as Venice, Siena and Urbino. While in the Tuscan city, the ILAUD participants studied the recovery of the Santa Maria della Scala in Siena. In Venice many projects were made concerning the city itself and its surrounding. None of them were actually realised nor considered by the city Administration, although there were public exhibitions held.

Has produced numerous publications as a result of proposals made by the host city.

== ILAUD Alumni ==
(incomplete list)

- Stig-Gunne Bengtsson Sweden
- Oscar Carracedo García-Villalba Spain
- Greg Albertson United States
- Andreu Arriola Spain
- Isabel Bachs Spain
- Carl Bäckstrand Sweden
- Elisabeth Andersson Sweden
- Josep Maria Birulès Bertràn Spain
- Per Erik Bjornsen Italy
- Angelo Bonanni Italy
- Patrizia Bruzzone Italy
- Vincenzo Casali Italy
- Toni Casamor Spain
- Emanuela Casati Italy
- Marco Ceccaroni Italy
- Simona Cirio Italy
- Mario Cucinella Italy
- Simonetta Daffarra Italy
- Giacomo Delbene Italy
- Johs Ensby Norway
- Jaime J. Ferrer Forés Spain
- Carme FiolSpain
- Giovanna Franco Italy
- Arturo Frediani Spain
- Olga Gambardella Italy
- Lars Gezelius Sweden
- Marco Guarino Italy
- Laura Carrara-Cagni Italy
- William Gilchrist United States
- Ingermarie Holmebakk Norway
- Ross Ishikawa United States
- Lisa Joyce United States
- Paul Janssen Belgium
- Dag Krogh Norway
- Duccio Malagamba Italy
- Susi Marzuola United States
- Maria Rita Menicucci Italy
- Enric Miralles Spain
- Juan Monsanto United States
- Mauro Moriconi Italy
- Maria Cristina Munari Italy
- Terezia Nemeth United States
- Elizabeth Newman United States
- Pascale Pieters Belgium
- Henrietta Palmer Sweden
- Mathias Persson Sweden
- Carme Pinos Spain
- Alessandro Quartieri Italy
- Francesco Rosadini Italy
- Viola Rouhani United States
- Tom Salvado Spain
- Yolanda Ortega Sanz Spain
- Peter Scupelli ItalyUnited States
- Christopher Sensenig United States
- Göran Skoog Sweden
- Adolf Sotoca Spain
- Anna Laura Spalla Italy
- Sabina Tattara Italy
- Clelia Tuscano Italy
- Carlos Velilla United States
- Stan Vistica United States
- Vidar Vollan Norway
- Laure Waast France
- Peter Waller United States
- Frank Pieters Belgium
- Marc Servaes Belgium
- Lars Westerberg Sweden
- Michela Zaniboni Italy
- José Manuel de la Puente Martorell Spain
- Elisabetta Parodi Dandini Italy
- Roberto Silvestri Italy
- Elisenda Tortajada

Siena, Italy – 1988

- Lars Westerberg Sweden
- Erik von Matern Sweden
- Nicolas Goubau Belgium

Venice, Italy – 2001

- Martine De Flander Belgium

Venice, Italy – 2002

- Silvia Bodei Italy
- Manuel Cordero Alvarado United States
- Salvador Davila United States
- Athina Katsanou Greece
- Lorenzo Mattozzi Italy
- Pietro Peyron Italy
- Carles Serrano Blanco Spain
- Davide Servente Italy
- Ulrika Staugaard Norway
- Roger Such Spain
- Laura Suñen Spain
- José Manuel Toral Spain
- Carolina Cajide Spain
- Emanuele Varone Italy

Venice, Italy – 2003

- Jacob Antherton United States
- Aimee Chan United States
- Chiara Desiderio Italy
- Susanna Douglas United States
- Fabio Gleria Italy
- Laura Masiero Italy
- Tommaso Trivellato Italy

== Participant Professors/Architects ==
(incomplete list)

- Oscar Carracedo García-Villalba Spain
- Andreu Arriola Spain
- Carme Fiol Spain
- Alberto Cecchetto Italy
- Francesco Calzolaio Italy
- Ignasi de Sola-Morales Spain
- Balkrishna Doshi
- Russ Ellis
- Sverre Fehn Norway
- Aquiles González Raventós Spain
- Jaime J. Ferrer Forés Spain
- Per Olaf Fjeld Norway
- Donlyn LindonUnited States
- Franco Mancuso
- Enric Massip-Bosch Spain
- John McKean United Kingdom
- Thomas McQuillan
- Carles Muro Spain
- Bernt Nilsson
- Connie Occhialini Italy
- Renzo Piano
- Daniele Pini
- Bruno Queysanne
- Francesco Samassa
- Adolf Sotoca Spain
- Peter Smithson United Kingdom
- Ezequiel Usón Spain
- Jan Wampler
- Francesco Gostoli Italy
- Lode Janssens Belgium
- Giorgio Bianchi Italy
- Donald Hart Italy
- Giorgio Bagnasco Italy
- Emmi Serra Italy
- Willy Serneels Belgium
- José Manuel de la Puente Spain
- Jill Stoner United States

== Staff ==
(incomplete list)

- Cristina Pucci Italy
- Stefano Tormene Italy
- Toni Garbasso Italy
