= Bice Valori =

Italian actress (1927–1980)

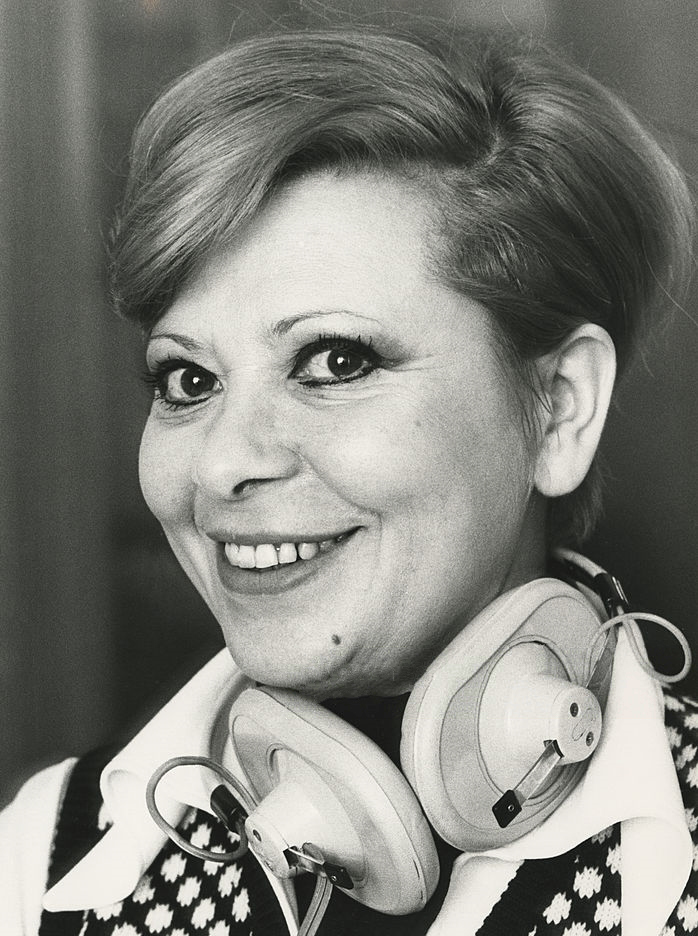
- Valori in 1973
- Born: Maria Beatrice Valori; 13 May 1927; Rome, Italy
- Died: 17 March 1980 (aged 52); Rome, Italy
- Education: Silvio d'Amico Academy of Dramatic Arts
- Occupations: Actress; comedian
- Spouse: Paolo Panelli (m. 1952)
- Father: Aldo Valori
- Relatives: Michele Valori (brother)

Maria Beatrice "Bice" Valori (Italian pronunciation: [ˈbiːtʃe vaˈloːri]; 13 May 1927 – 17 March 1980) was an Italian actress, comedian and television and radio personality.

== Early life and career ==
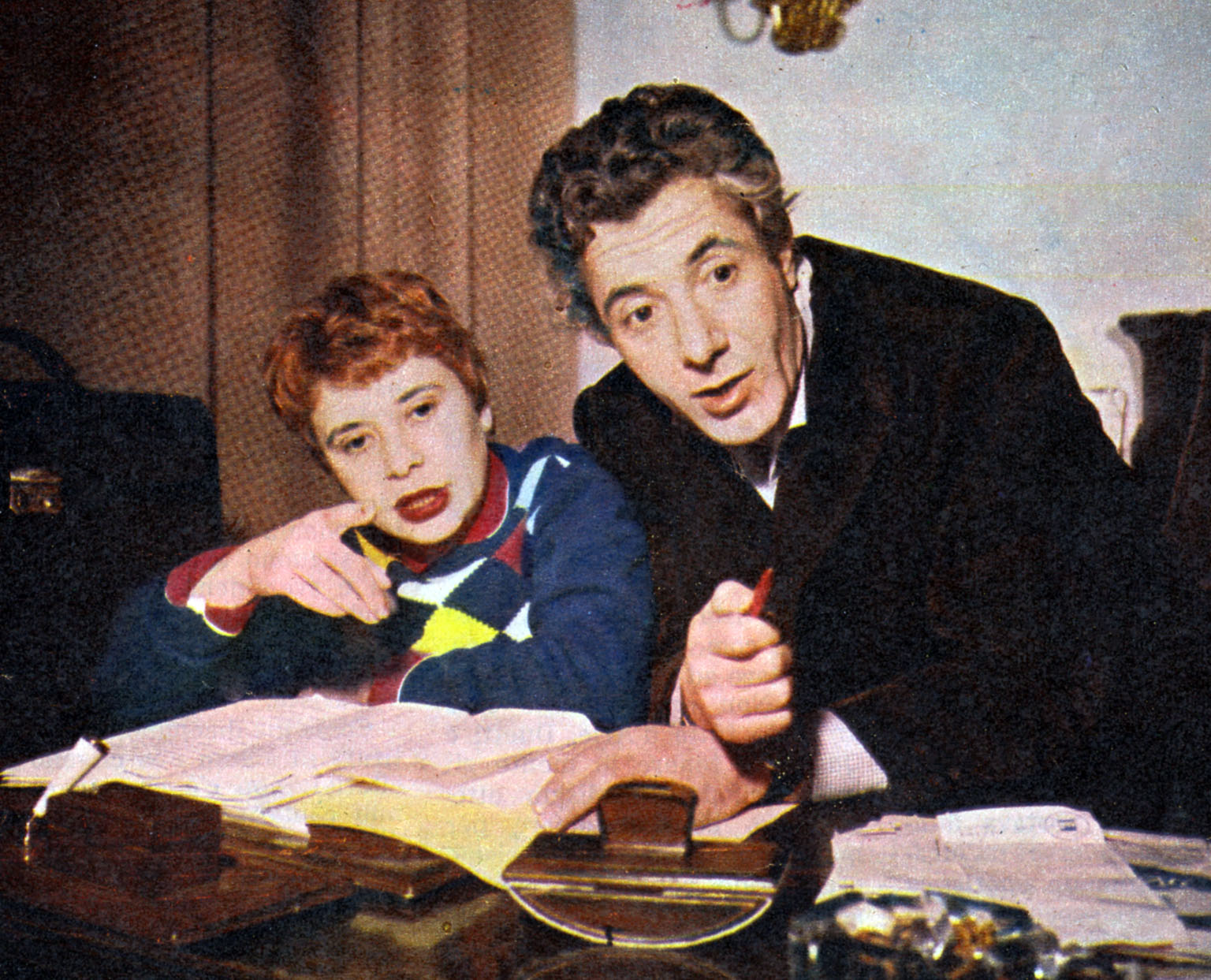
Valori and Gianrico Tedeschi on stage in 1957

Born in Rome, Valori studied at the Silvio d'Amico Academy of Dramatic Arts, graduating in 1948. The same year, she entered the stage company of the Piccolo Teatro of Rome directed by Orazio Costa. After playing in several classics, Valori specialized as a comedic actress, and had her main successes in the musical theatre genre, notably appearing in Rugantino and Aggiungi un posto a tavola. In films, she was a very active character actress, mainly cast in humorous roles. Valori appeared often on television, as a comedian, a presenter and an actress in series and TV-movies of some success. She also had a consistent success on radio, in which she created the character of "Sora Bice", a shrewish RAI telephone operator.

== Personal life and death ==
Valori often shared the scene with her husband, the actor and comedian Paolo Panelli, whom she had married in 1952. Their daughter Alessandra is also an actress. Valori died in 1980, aged 52, as a result of a tumor.

== Partial filmography ==
- His Last Twelve Hours (1950) – a witness of the accident
- Accidents to the Taxes!! (1951) – boarding school pupil
- Toto the Third Man (1951) – Luisa, Pietro's wife
- Seven Hours of Trouble (1951) – Maddalena, the nursemaid
- The Steamship Owner (1951) – Marga
- My Heart Sings (1951) – Liliana
- Deceit (1952) – Giustina
- Good Folk's Sunday (1953) (uncredited)
- Siamo tutti inquilini (1953) – waitress
- Marriage (1954) – Anna Snakina, the midwife
- Papà Pacifico (1954) – Gina, the servant
- The Three Thieves (1954) – a friend of Doris'
- The Belle of Rome (1955) – Sister Serafina
- La moglie è uguale per tutti (1955) – Giulietta's sister
- Bravissimo (1955) – soprano
- The Most Wonderful Moment (1957) – Carla
- Susanna Whipped Cream (1957) – Rossella
- Femmine tre volte (1957) – Katiuscia
- La zia d'America va a sciare (1957) – Faustina
- Maid, Thief and Guard (1958) – the countess
- Le dritte (1958) – Edna Piselli
- Caporale di giornata (1958) – Gelsomina
- Mia nonna poliziotto (1958) – Francesca
- Le confident de ces dames (1959) – Lucienne
- Guardatele ma non toccatele (1959) – Irma, La Notte's wife
- Tough Guys (1960) – Genzianetta
- Le signore (1960) – Nora
- Caccia al marito (1960) – Giuditta, the nursemaid
- Il carro armato dell'8 settembre (1960)
- Ferragosto in bikini (1960) – Gladys
- 5 marines per 100 ragazze (1961) – the director
- Hercules in the Valley of Woe (1961)
- Scandali al mare (1961) – Beatrice Garfanò
- Mariti a congresso (1961)
- Adultero lui, adultera lei (1963) – the defense attorney
- Le motorizzate (1963) – Lola Rossi (segment "La roulotte squillo")
- Salad by the Roots (1964) – aunt Ophélie (uncredited)
- Amori pericolosi (1964) – the housekeeper (segment "Il generale")
- Oltraggio al pudore (1964)
- Il giornalino di Gian Burrasca (1964) – Geltrude, the boarding school director
- Le sedicenni (1965)
- Rita the Mosquito (1966) – Luigina, the school director
- The Taming of the Shrew (1967) – the widow
- Be Sick... It's Free (1968) – Amelia, Dr. Bui's wife
- Gli infermieri della mutua (1969) – Dr. Venanzi
- Il suo nome è Donna Rosa (1969) – Donna Rosa
- Lisa dagli occhi blu (1970) – mom Coco Prandi
- Mezzanotte d'amore (1970) – Donna Rosa
