= Francesco Gostoli =

Italian architect (born 1946)

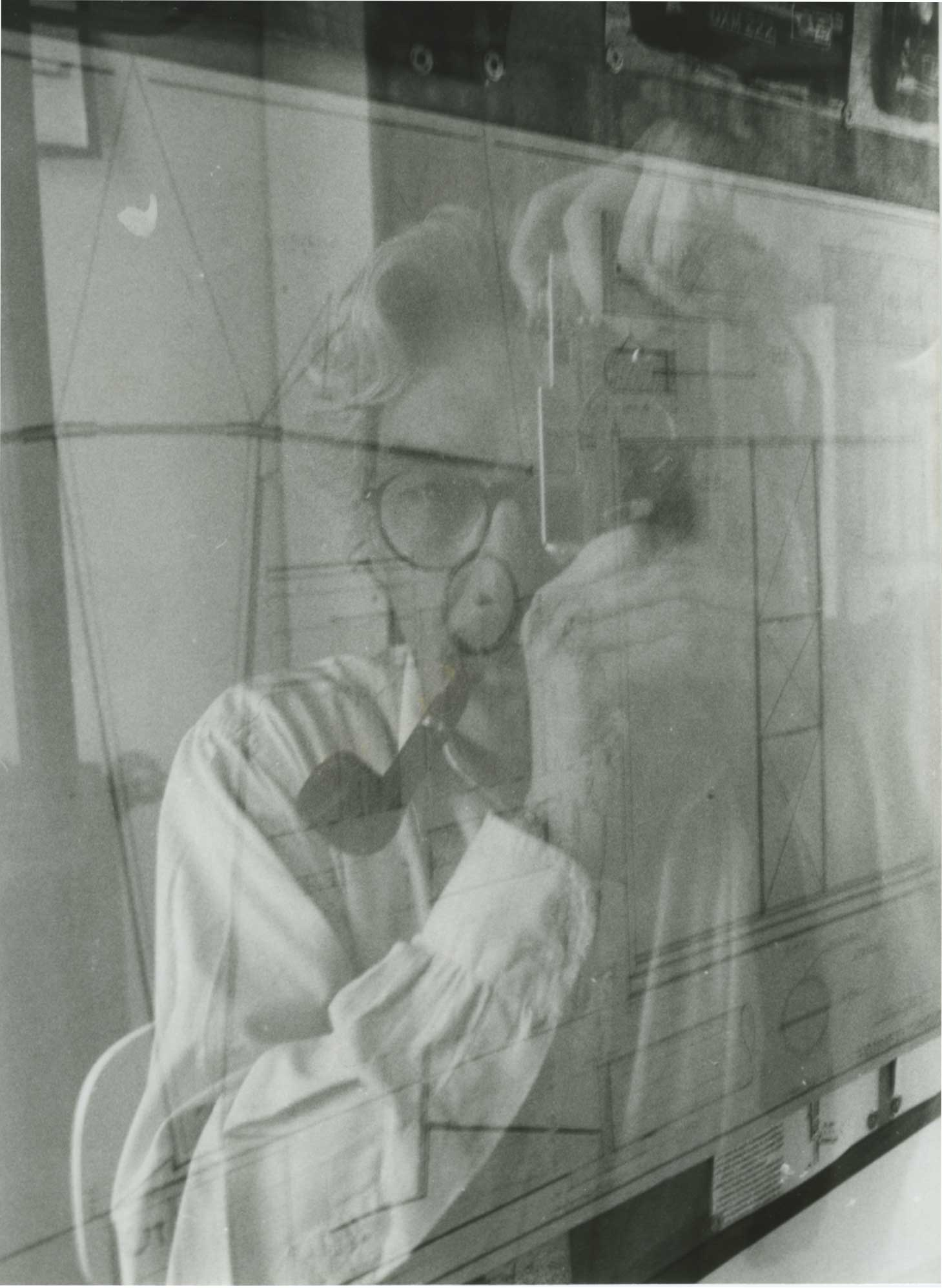
Francesco Gostoli

Francesco Gostoli (born 1946, Rome) is an Italian architect. He has written a great number of articles and studies for journals and magazines such as Spazio & Società. He invented the Metro Armonico, a means of creating and defining ergonomic dimensions, published in “Architecture as I see it”, 2004.

== Biography ==
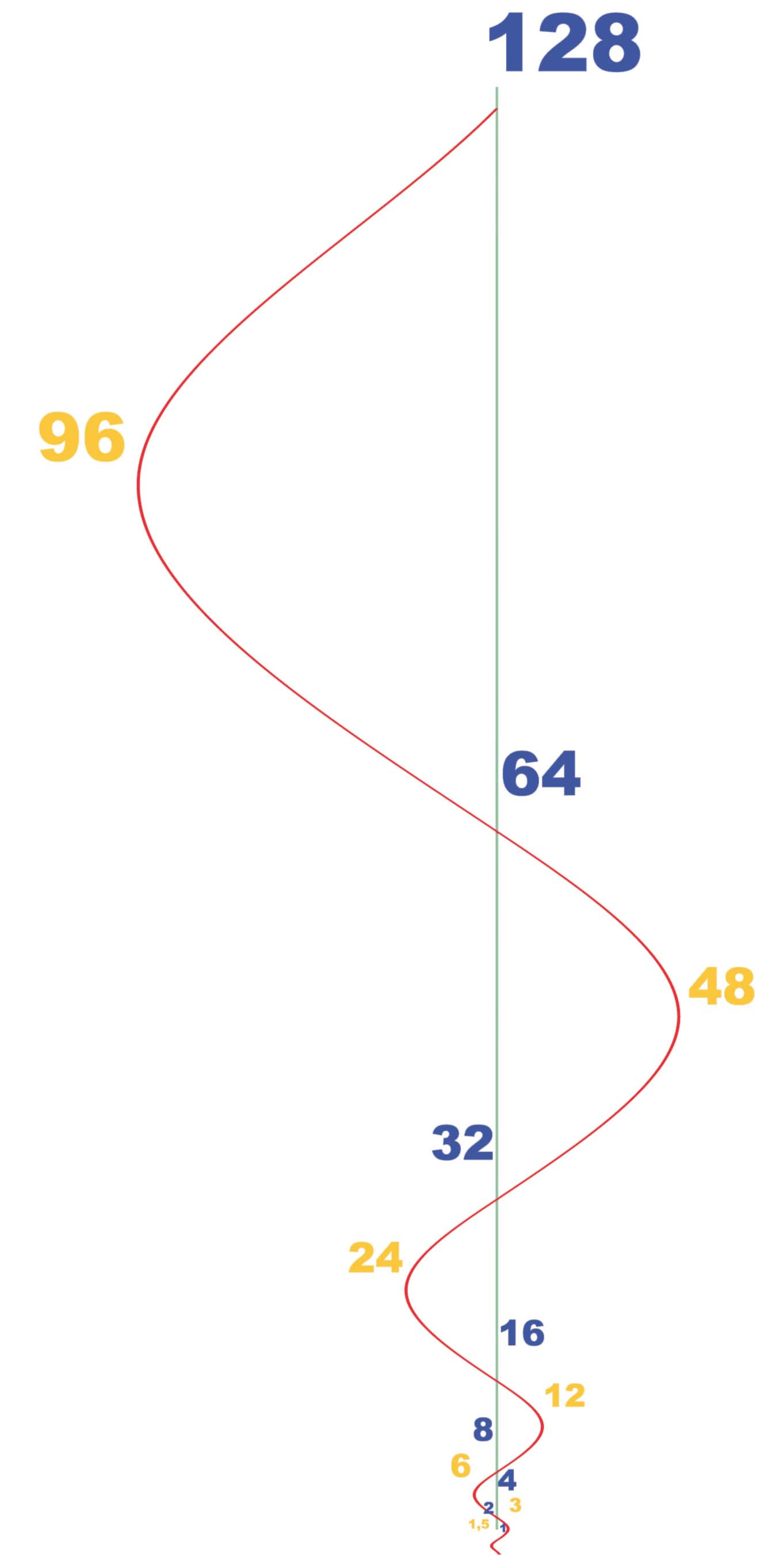
MetroArmonico

Gostoli was born in Rome in 1946. Initially he was self-taught. He enrolled in the Architectural faculty in Rome in 1969. He was a pupil of Sergio Musmeci under whom he graduated in 1975 in the course “ Bridges and major structures”. In 1976 he attended a course on Prevention of structural damage at the Engineering Department of Rome University and a course in Nude Drawing at The Fine Arts Academy in Rome. He began his study of the human body, which was to lead him to the invention of the Metro Armonico. In 1984 he met Giancarlo De Carlo with whom he had the opportunity to verify their own critical positions regarding the architecture and town-planning in the closing years of the twentieth century. Whilst attending the ILAUD (International Laboratory and Urban Design) he came into contact with Ralph Erskine, Sverre Fehn and Peter Smithson. Referring to Gostoli, Bruno Zevi stated “ I published a passage written by Gostoli as an editorial of my magazine, an event that has happened only rarely in the 40 years of its monthly appearance.” He has taught at the IUAV, The Camerino University, Cà Foscari University of Venice and The University of Udine. His plans have been published in “domus”, “casabella”, “Spazio e Società”, “ Costruire”, “villegiardini”, and many other journals.

=== Teaching ===
From 1985 to 1990 he taught town planning at the IUAV. Between 1988 and 1990 he lectured in “Science of Materials” at the European Center of craftsmen for the protection of Architectural Heritage. From 1993 to 2000 he helped establish the Architecture Department in Ascoli Piceno. Here he taught Urban Composition and Planning.

Between 1998 and 2008 he taught “ Theory and Techniques in Architectural Restoration” and “ Interior Architecture” at Cà Foscari University in Venice. Between 2010 and 2012 he oversaw a design course at the Engineering Department of Udine University, where he gave lessons on the Theory of the “Structural Minimum”, elaborated by Sergio Musmeci. In 2014 he lectured on the Theory of the “Structural Minimum” at Trento University Department of Civil and Environmental Engineering

=== Architectural Journals ===
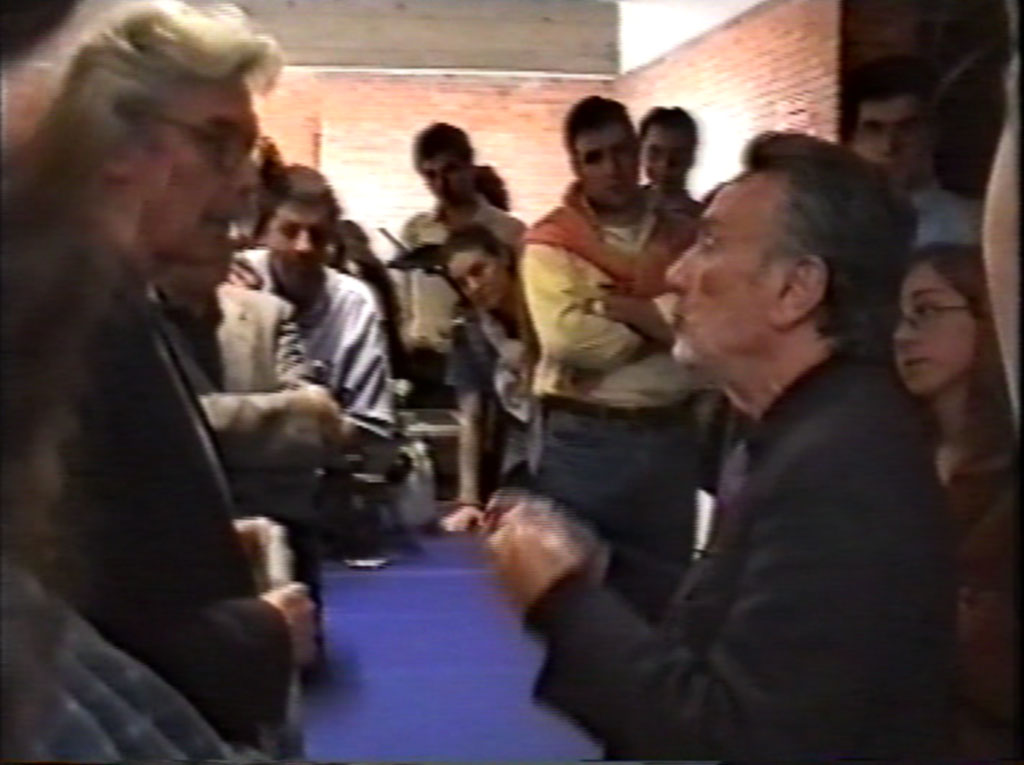
Francesco Gostoli with Giancarlo De Carlo at a seminar in Urbino

In 1993 he was called upon by Bruno Zevi to participate on the journal “ L’architettura, cronache e storia.”, and in 1999 he was appointed Italian correspondent on the journal “Spazio e Società” by Giancarlo De Carlo. In 2003 he was a member of the Committee for the Department of Community Policy for the Head of the Council of Ministers. He presented the urban planning proposal established by European Guidelines for facilitating access for younger generations. The other major task was to analyse the ideal characteristics for a contemporary museum.

In 2012 he made the opening introductory speech for the International seminar at Alfenas University, Brazil.

== Notable works ==
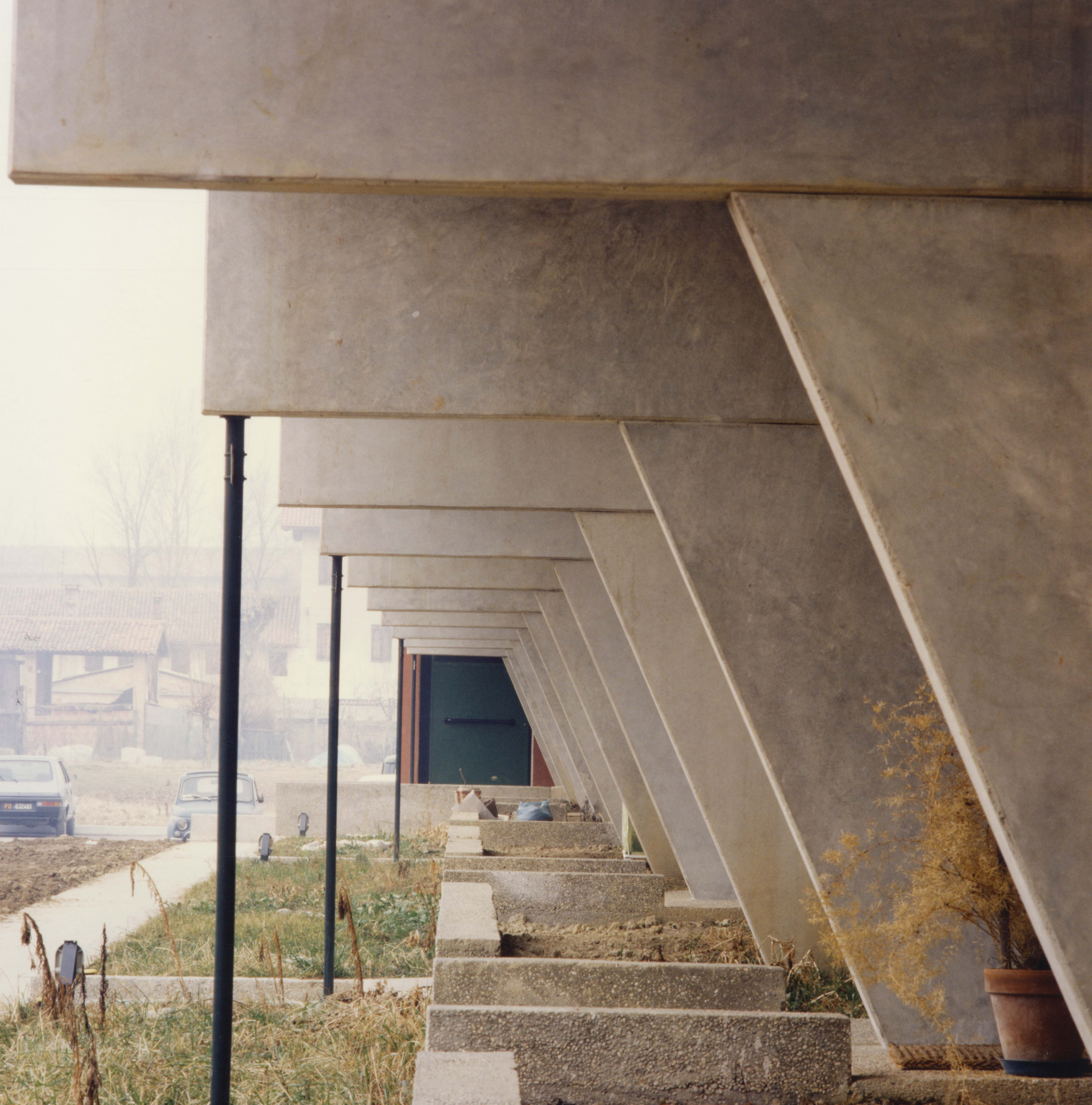
“New City planning”. 42 homes/dwellings, Padua

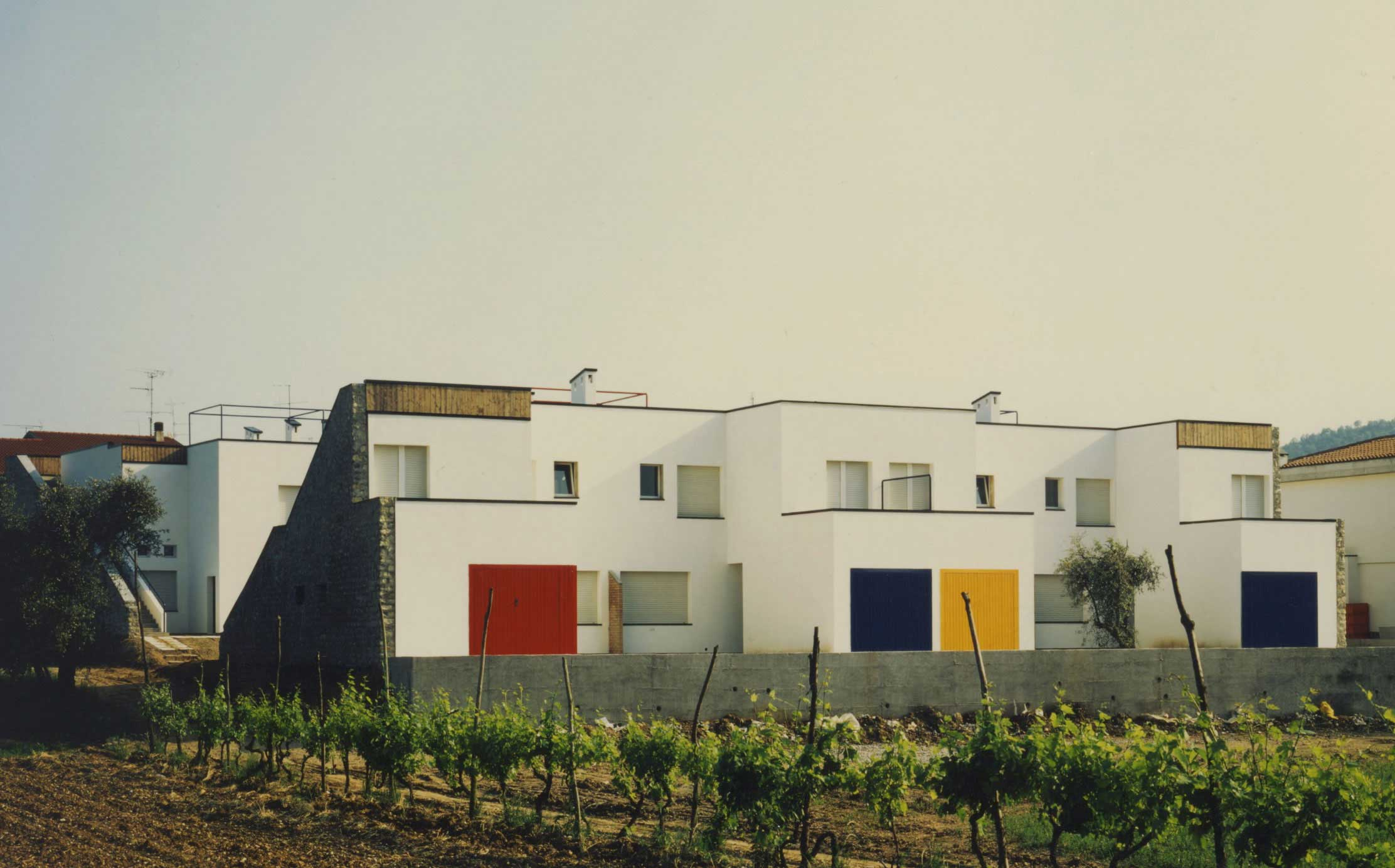
Public housing units. Salò

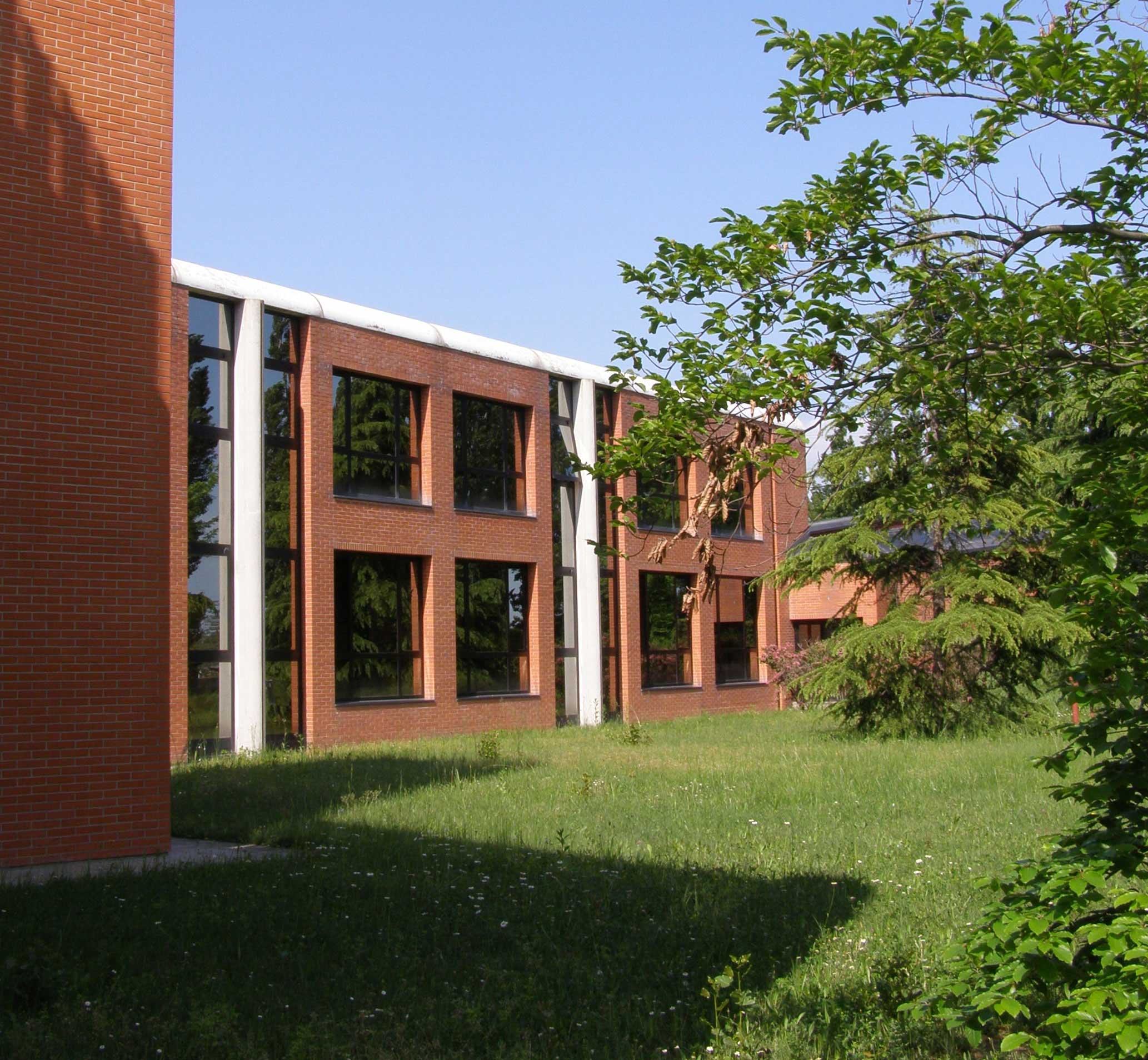
Motorway Authority offices. Venice

In 1978 he won a public competition for the drawing-up of plans for structural interventions within the city center of Venice. In 1980 he designed a “New Town Plan” for Padua, a residential complex of 42 dwellings in which he pioneered a “barrel roof” which exploits solar energy.

In 1984 he presented a plan to achieve order and harmony in a chaotic and illegally evolved outer-urban sprawl, Chioggia (Venice). In 1990 he made plans for eight public housing units in Salò (BR.) where he realized the natural air–blending system by harnessing the ascending movements of the air. In 1998 he took part in a competition for the New Center of IUAV in Venice, in which he planned, with the Venetian Physicist Alberto Benedetti, using (a) the roofs, (b) the inside of the hollow foundation piles and (c) the saturated underground subsoil of the Venice Lagoon respectively for absorption, distribution and accumulation of solar Energy. In 2001 he designed The New Bertoliana Library within the city center of Vicenza. In this plan, he pioneered the adaptability of the areas for differing functions. In 2006 he designed The New Entrance to the Italian Pavilion of the Venice Biennale at the Arsenale and in 2007 designed the prototype for the Museum of Sound, using the Metro Armonico.

In 2011 he won the “Eco-space 2011 – houses for sustainable living” competition organized by the Ministry of the Environment with his project “casaminima 45”. A low-cost dwelling–place for young people. The prototype was put on show at the MAXXI Museum, in Rome.

== Plans ==
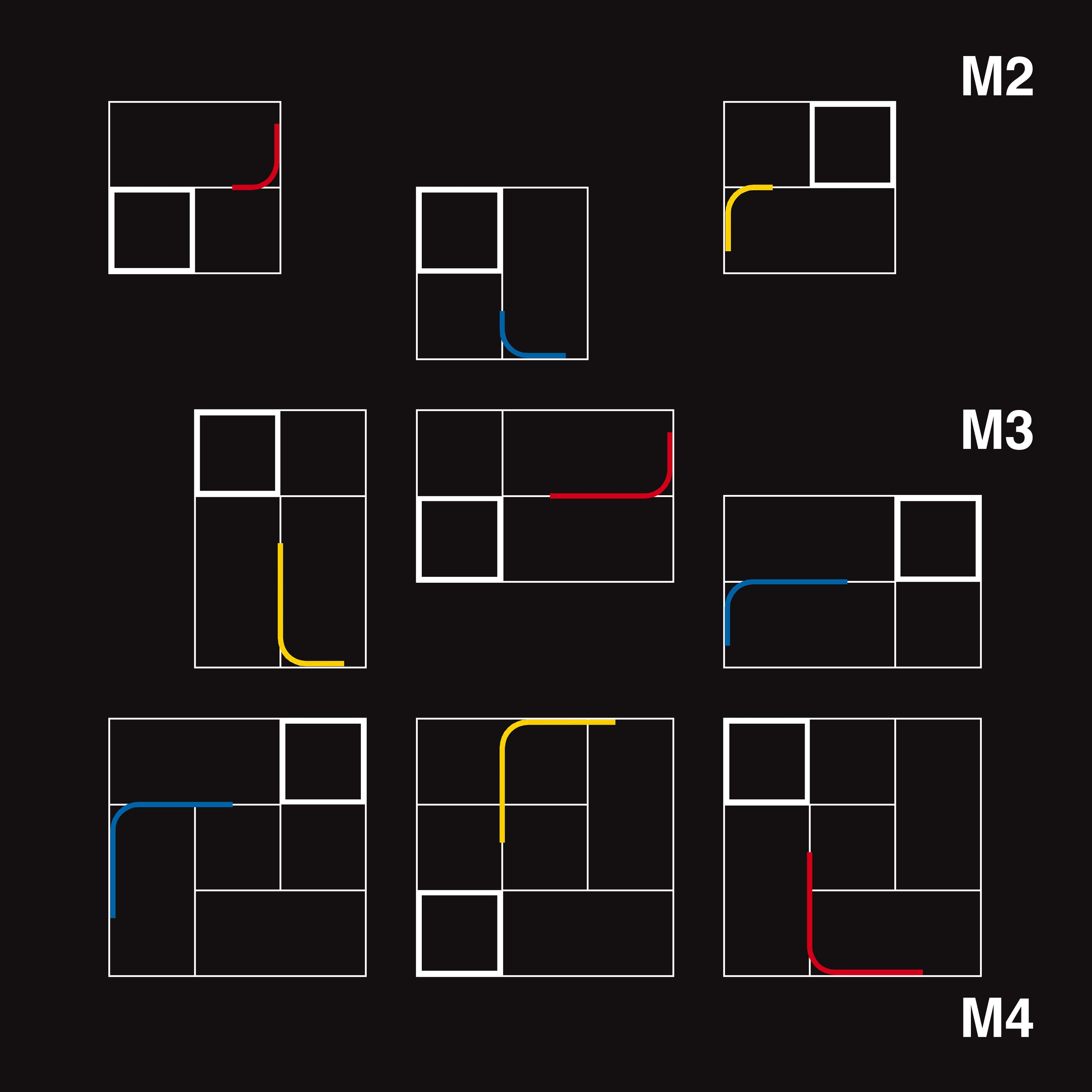
M2,M3,M4 – casaminima a system of wooden modules respecting MA. The internal areas are divided by a sliding wall in a choice of three colors – red, yellow or blue- which define the space and the decor.

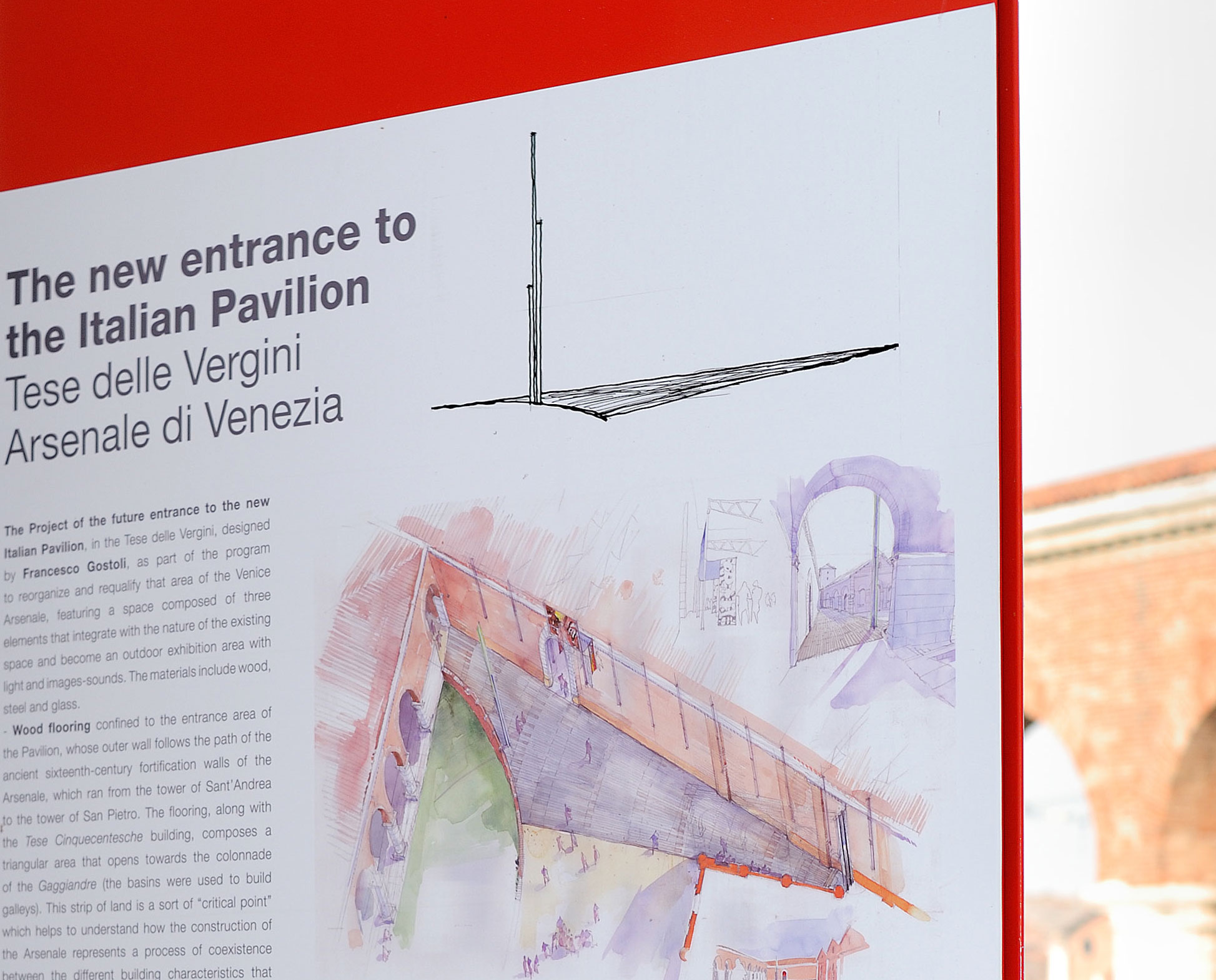
Venice Biennale, Arsenale, New Entrance to the Italian Pavilion.

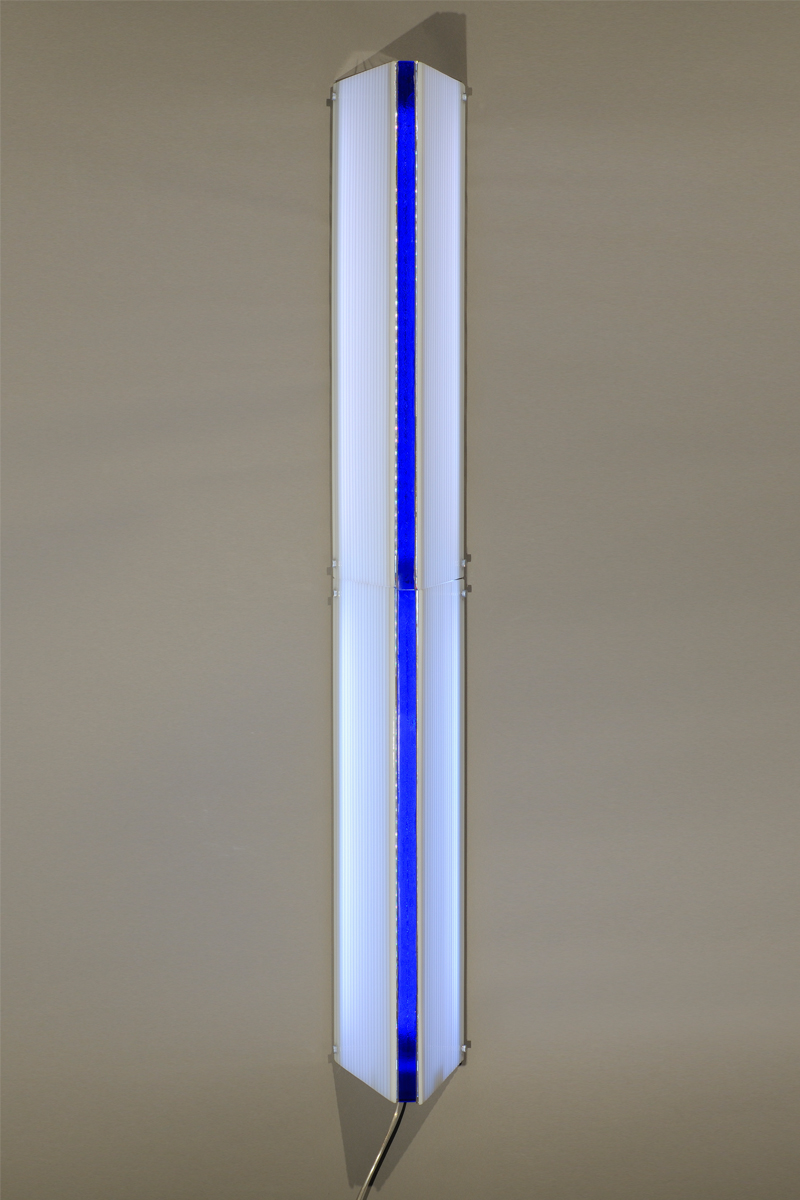
Vertical opal glass wall light-fitting made in Murano

- 1979 Art Gallery for the Church of the Franciscans, Mercatello, Urbino
- 1980 “New City planning”. 42 homes/dwellings, Padua.
- 1983 Residential Complex. Giudecca Island, Venice.
- 1984
  - Rescuing of the “Brondolo” suburb – Chioggia. Venice.
  - self-building residential quarter at Cavarzere, Venice
- 1985 Residential complex for self-sufficient elderly and young people, Chioggia. Venice.

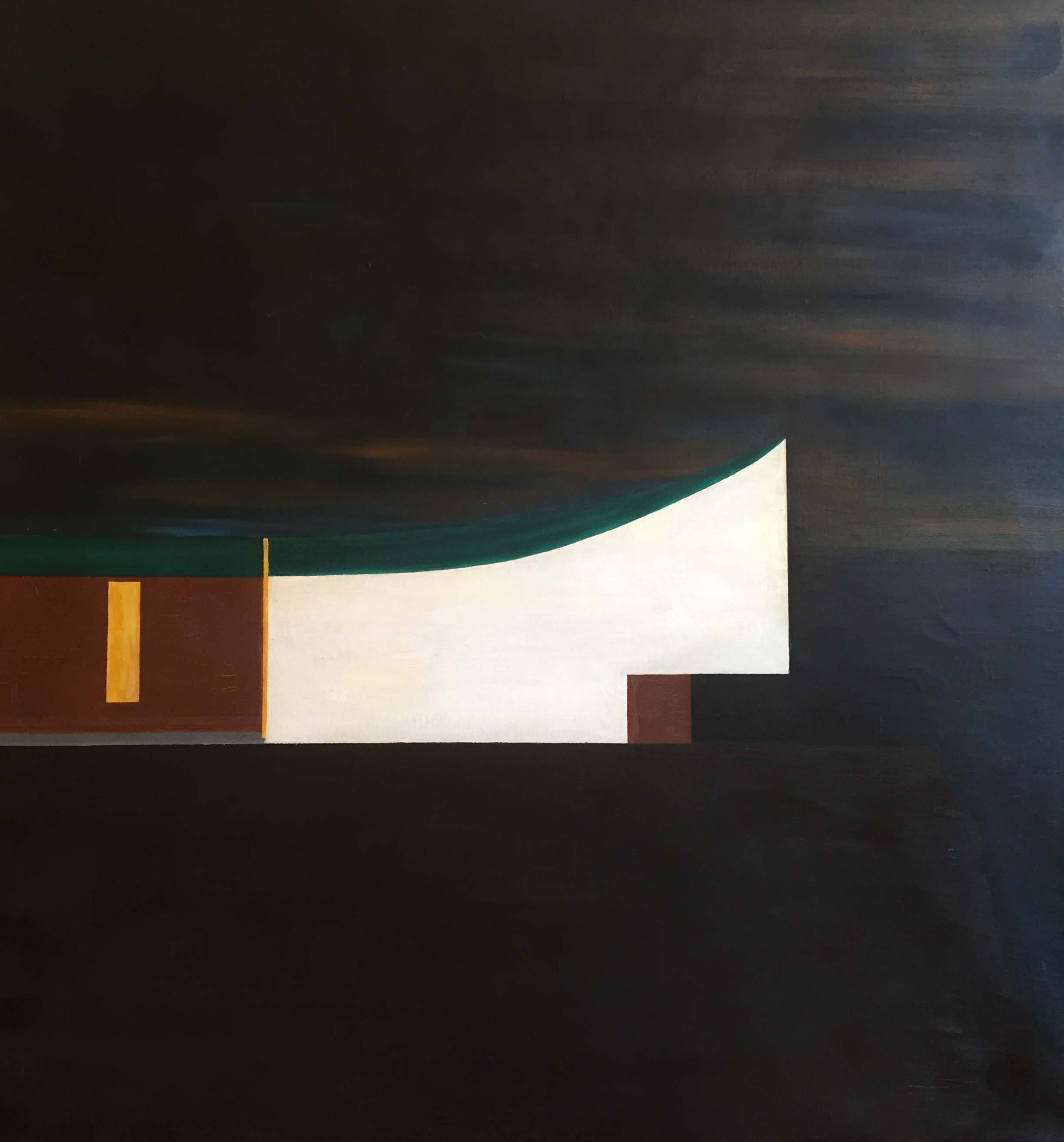
Oil on canvas 90x90 cm – Residential complex for self-sufficient elderly and young people, Chioggia (Venice)

- 1987 Structural interventions of 17th Century building complex. Mercatello, Urbino.
- 1988 Market place, bell-tower and portico; Eraclea, Venice
- 1990
  - Eight public housing units. Salò, Brescia.
  - Motorway Authority offices. Venice
- 1991 Exhibition design for the Jacopo da Ponte Exhibition, City Museum. Bassano, Vicenza.
- 1993 Town Planning project for the old Cty Center of Vicenza
- 1995 Town Planning project. Acquasanta Terme, Ascoli Piceno.
- 1999 Structural interventions within historic complex Chianti Area, Tuscany
- 2001 The New Bertoliana Library. Vicenza
- 2002 Sculpture Gallery for the works of Maria Scola Camerini at the Castle of Creazzo, Vicenza
- 2003 Environmental project. Asolo, Treviso.
- 2004 Structural interventions at the Villa Belvedere. Asolo, Treviso.
- 2005 Interior of the Humanistic Library at Cà Foscari University. Venice.
- 2006 New Entrance to the Italian Pavilion of the Biennale at the Arsenale. Venice.
- 2007 Design of the prototype for the Museum of Sound. Multi-functional and adaptable venue.
- 2008 “casaminima”, wooden modular structure
- 2010 Design Exhibition area dedicated to Aung San Sun Ky, at the Philosophy Department, Cà Foscari University. Venice.
- 2011 “casaminima 45”
- 2016 Restructuring ancient band – Ollomont (Aosta)
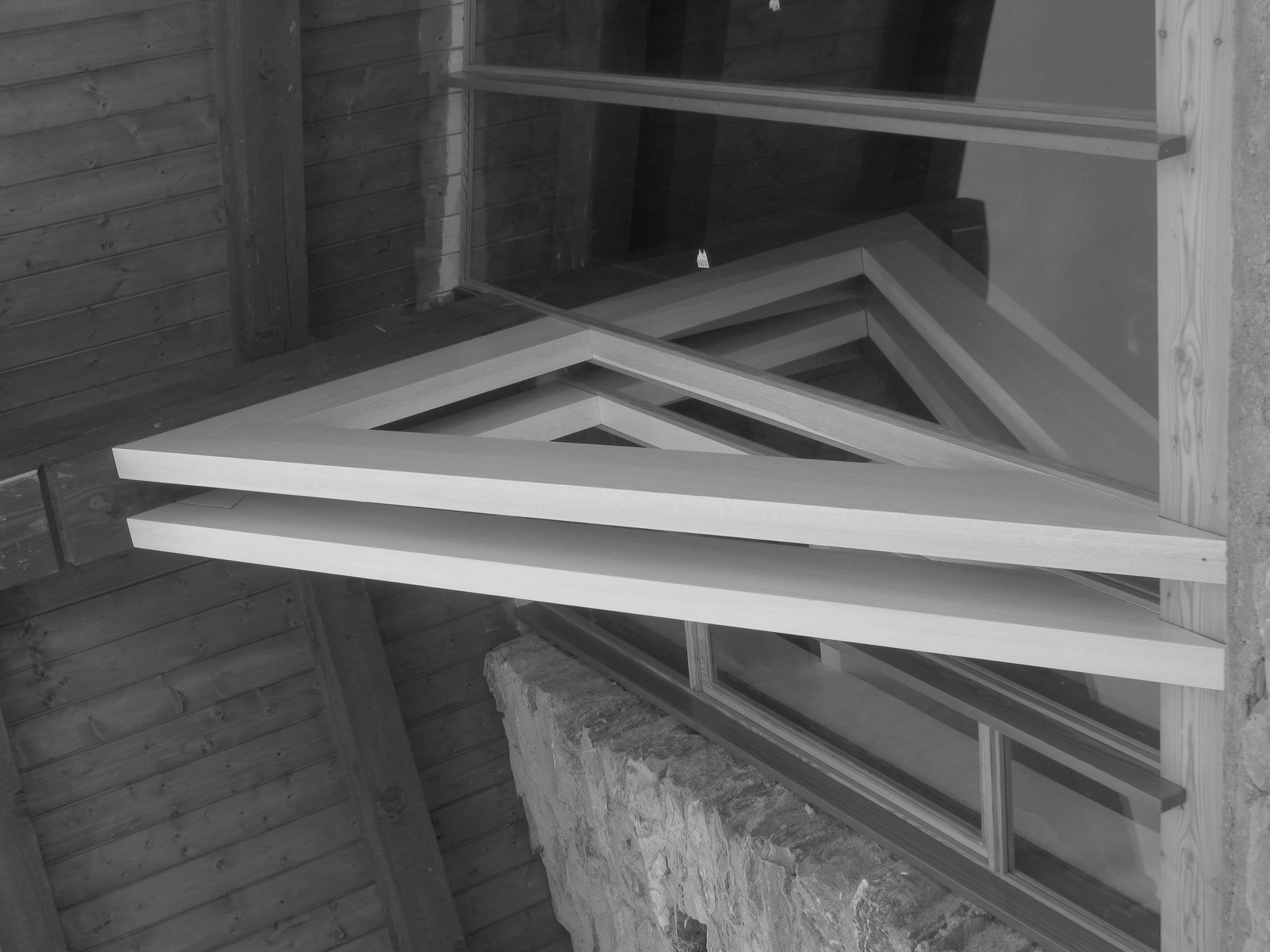
Restructuring ancient barn Ollomont (AO) - Butteress of the roof beam

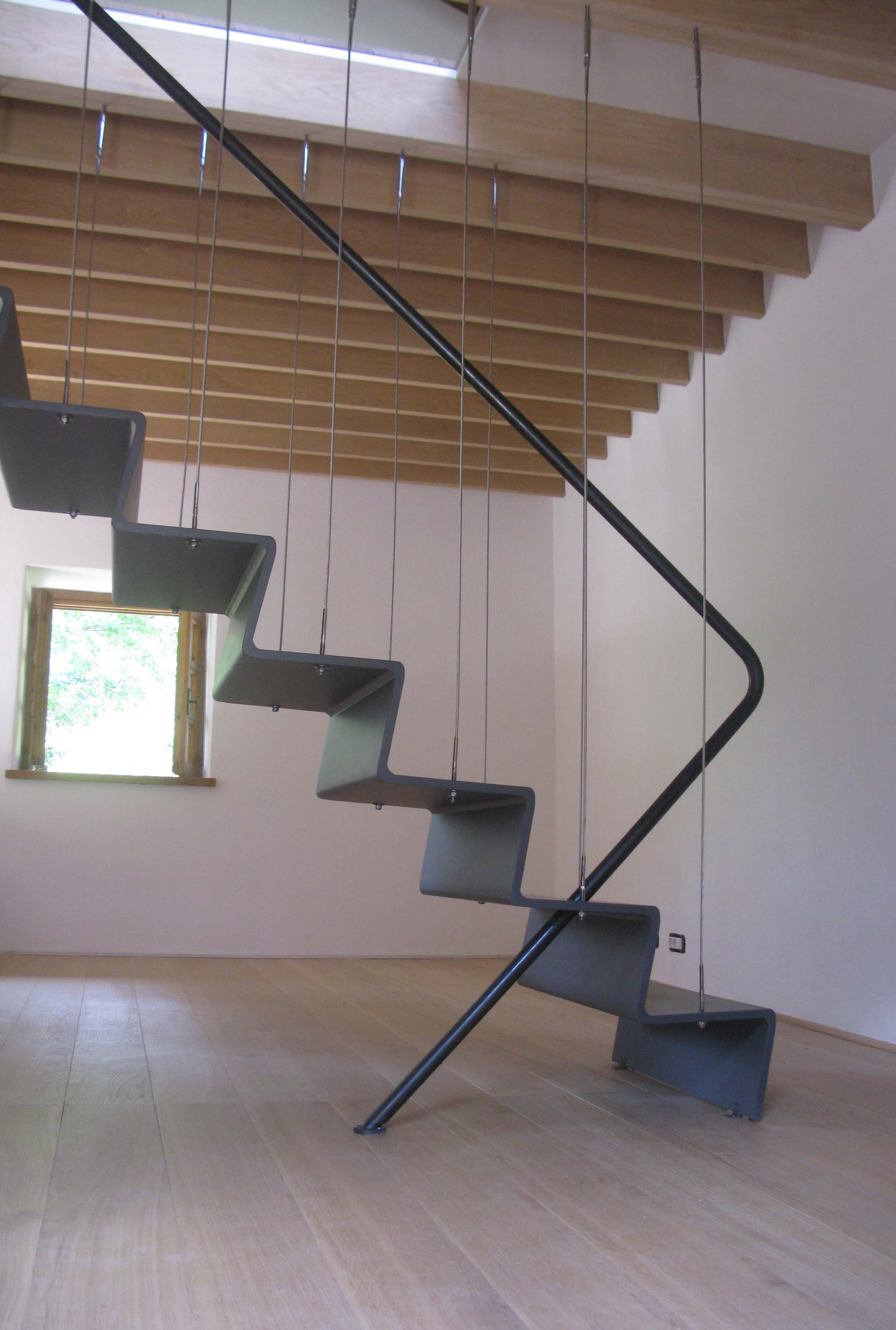
Restructuring ancient barn Ollomont (AO) suspended-starcase realized with layered silver-birch

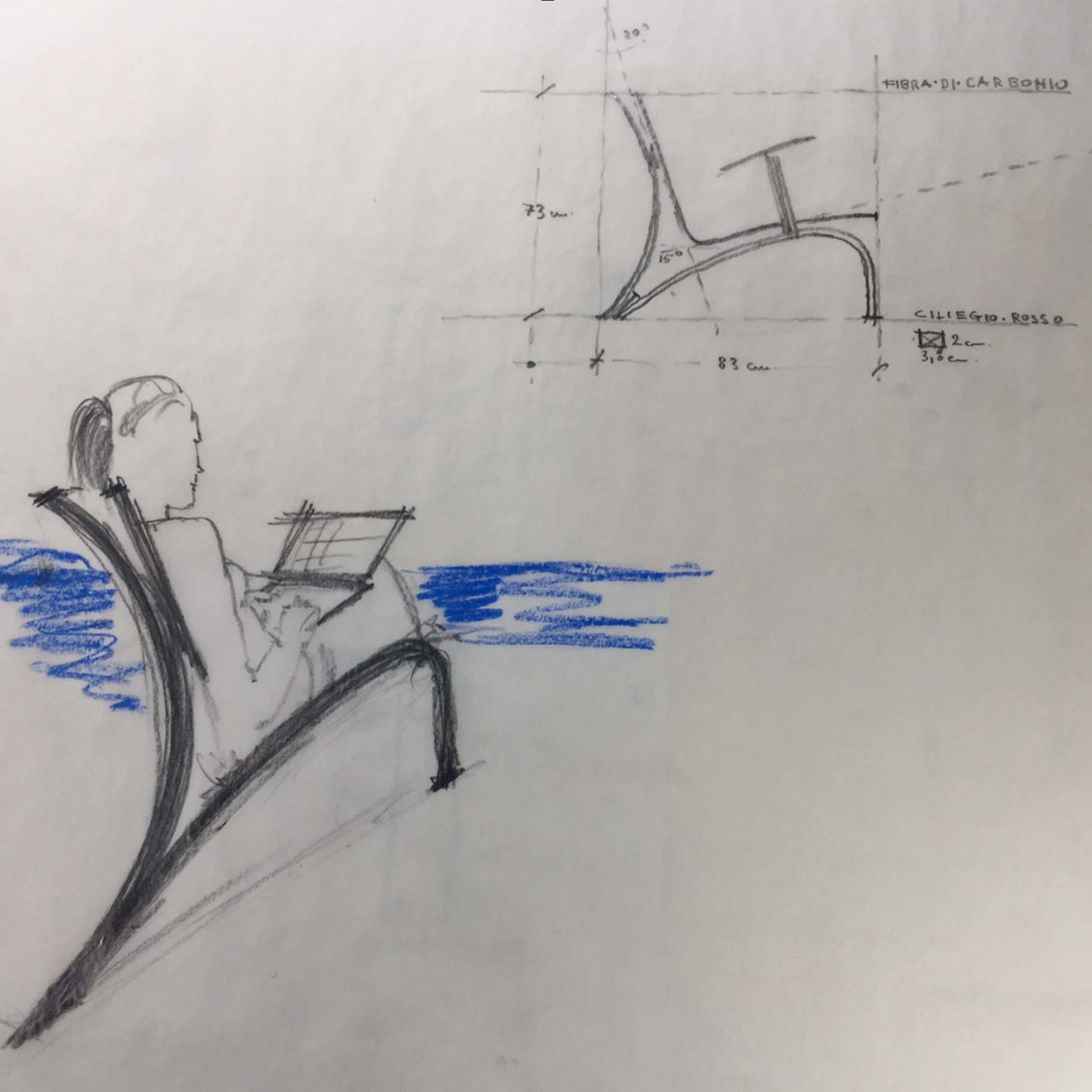
Chair blue

== Publications ==
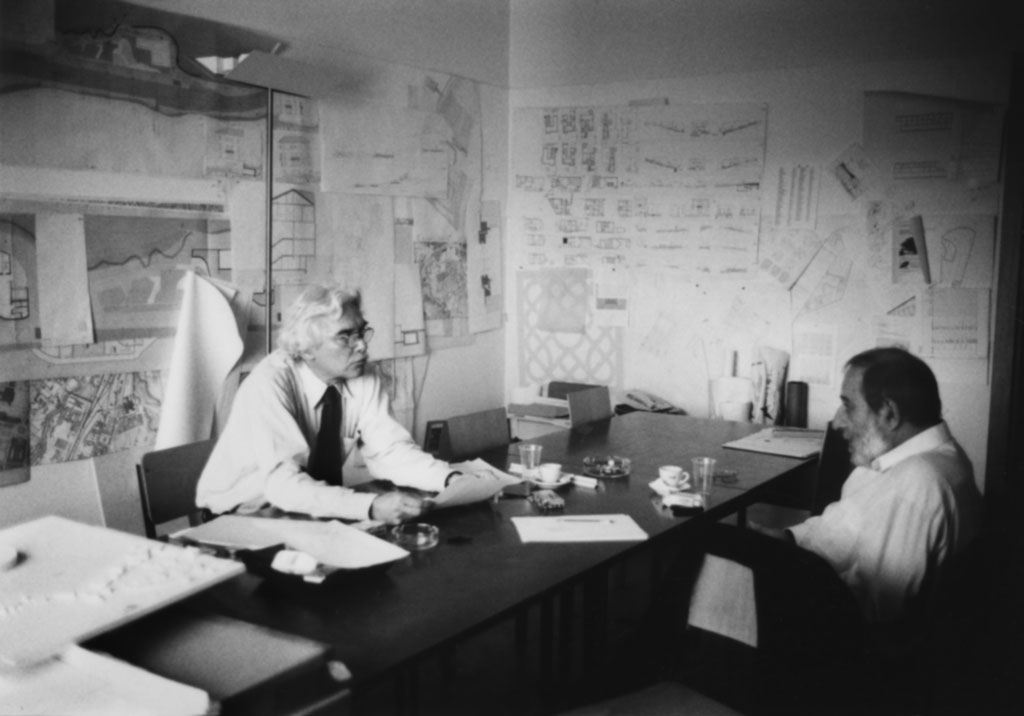
Francesco Gostoli with Alvaro Siza at Siza's studio, Porto.

- Arsenale Editrice, ed. (1990). Le due città – dialoghi con Quaroni e Gardella, opinioni, ipotesi progettuali. Venezia. ISBN 978-88-7743-086-1.
- Silvana Editoriale, ed. (2004). Architecture as I see it Metro Armonico come io penso l'architettura. Milano. ISBN 978-88-8215-740-1.
- Libreria Editrice Cafoscarina, ed. (2008). Spazi guida per la progettazione di un museo contemporaneo. Venezia. ISBN 978-88-7543-199-0.
- Libreria Editrice Cafoscarina, ed. (2012). Una buona conversazione. dialogo con Alvaro Siza. Venezia. ISBN 978-88-7543-253-9.
- Libreria Editrice Cafoscarina, ed. (2014). Francesco Gostoli 1980/2013. Venezia. ISBN 978-88-7543-371-0.

== Exhibitions ==
- 2006 Venice Biennale, Arsenale, Venezia
- 2012 MAXXI – National Museum of the 21st Century Arts, Rome
