= MAXXI =

Museum in Rome, Italy

- MAXXI exterior
- Click on the map for a fullscreen view
- Established: 28 May 2010
- Location: Rome, Italy
- Coordinates: 41°55′44″N 12°27′58″E
- Architect: Zaha Hadid
- Website: maxxi.art

MAXXI (Italian: Museo nazionale delle arti del XXI secolo, 'national museum of 21st-century arts') is a national museum of contemporary art and architecture in the Flaminio neighborhood of Rome, Italy. The museum is managed by a foundation created by the Italian Ministry of Culture. The building was designed by Zaha Hadid, and won the Stirling Prize of the Royal Institute of British Architects in 2010.

== History ==
In 1998, an international design competition for the design of the museum building was won by Zaha Hadid. Her submission included five separate structures, of which only one was completed. It was built on the site of a former military barracks, the Caserma Montello, incorporating parts of it.

The museum took more than ten years to build, and opened to the public in 2010. It received the Stirling Prize for architecture of the Royal Institute of British Architects in the same year.

The Guardian has called the MAXXI building "Hadid's finest built work to date" and "a masterpiece fit to sit alongside Rome's ancient wonders".

== Description ==
MAXXI consists of two museums: "MAXXI Art" and "MAXXI Architecture". "MAXXI Architecture" represents Italy's first national museum of architecture, and is dedicated to modern and contemporary Italian and international architecture. The outdoor courtyard surrounding the museum provides a venue for large-scale works of art.

== Gallery ==
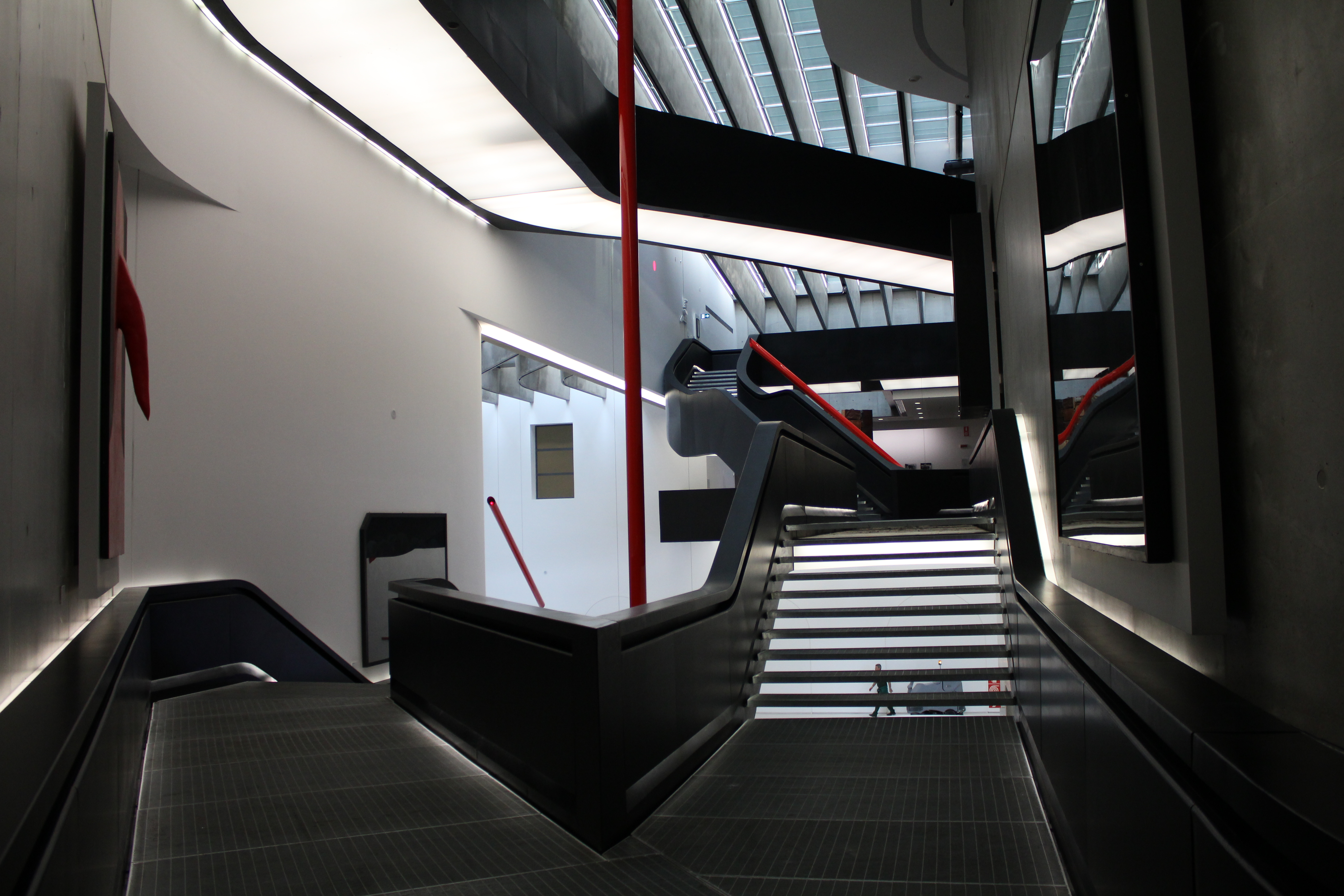

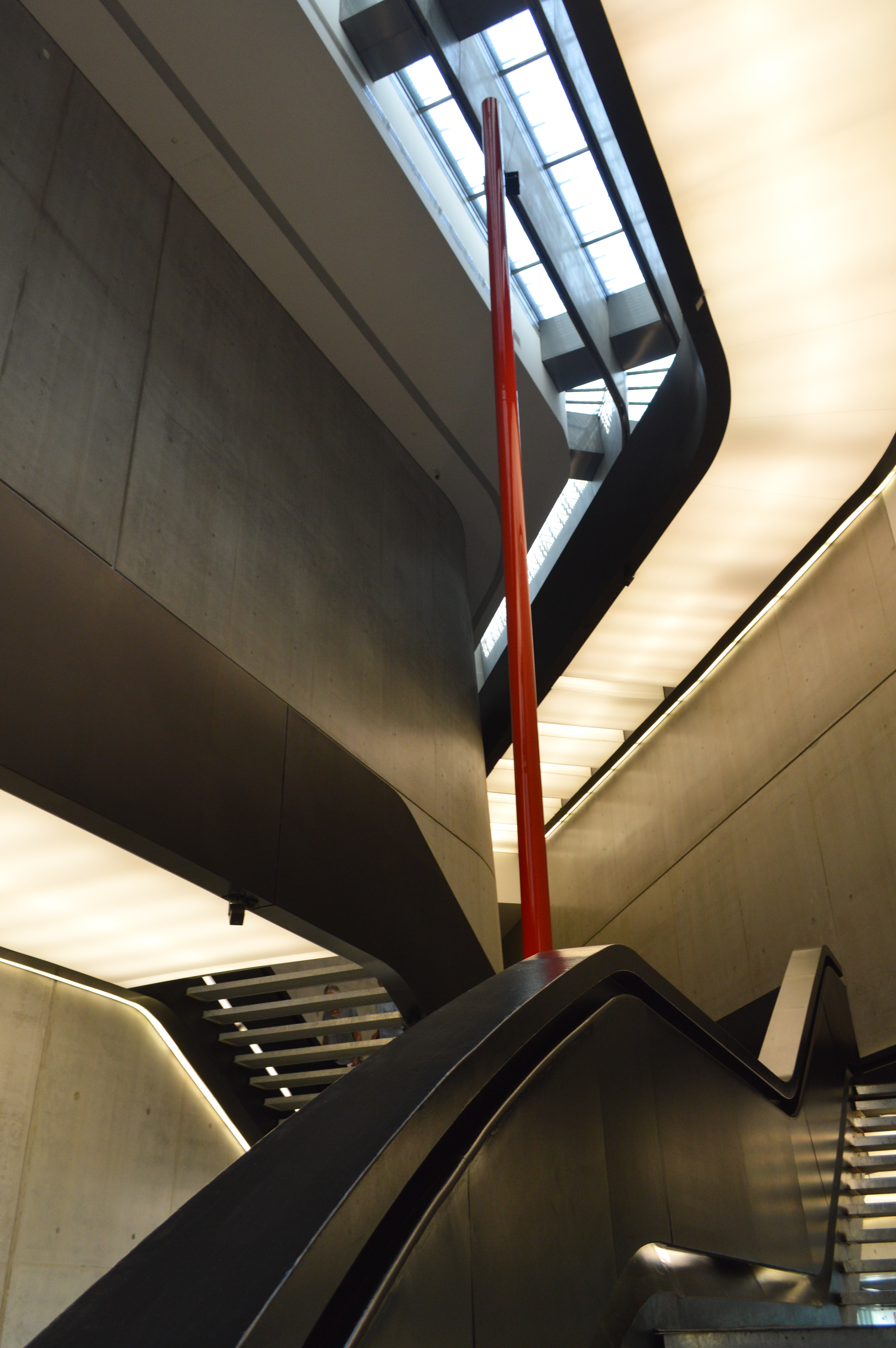

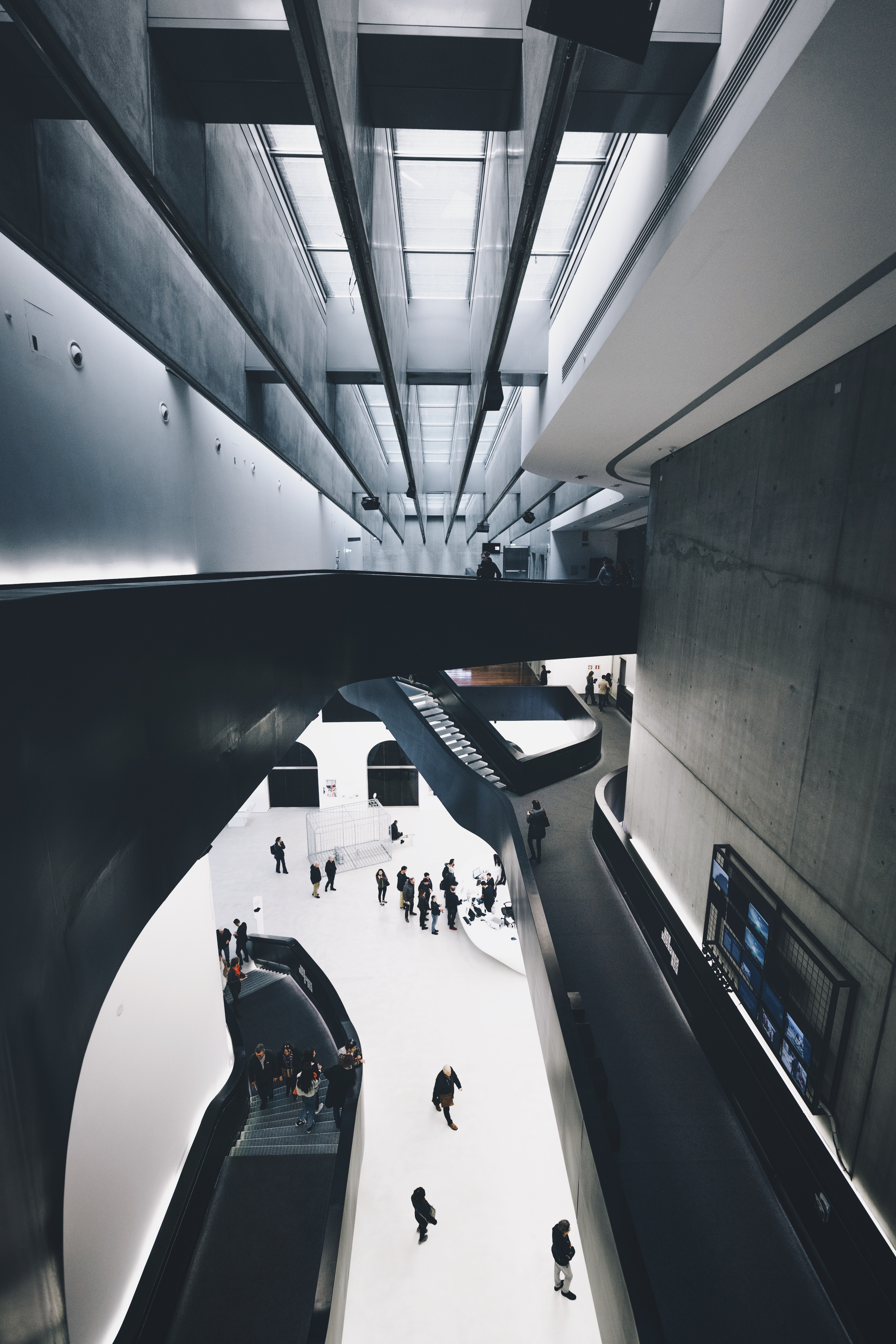

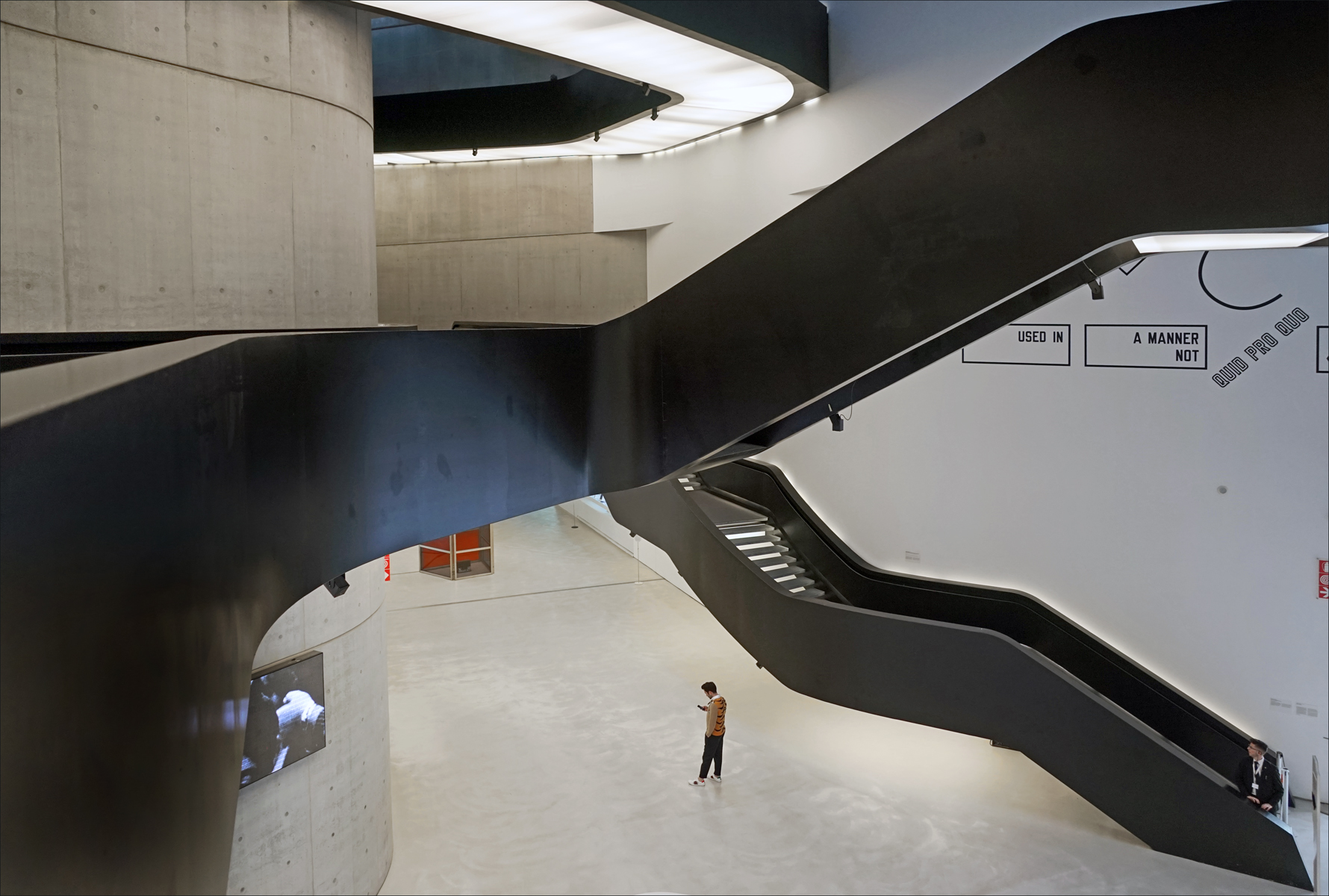

== MAXXI L'Aquila ==
On 30 October 2020, a branch of the museum opened in L'Aquila, capital of the Regione Abruzzo. It is housed in the Palazzo Ardinghelli, an eighteenth-century palace that was severely damaged in the earthquake of 2009 and later restored by the Italian Ministry of cultural heritage and tourism, with additional funding from the Russian government.

== Collections ==
The permanent collections of these two museums grow through direct acquisitions, as well as through commissions, thematic competitions, awards for young artists, donations, and permanent loans. The collection includes work by:

- Alighiero Boetti
- Grazia Toderi
- William Kentridge
- Kara Walker
- Ed Ruscha
- Gilbert & George
- Gino De Dominicis
- Michael Raedecker
- Anish Kapoor
- Gerhard Richter
- Francesco Clemente
- Lara Favaretto
- Marlene Dumas
- Maurizio Cattelan
- Gabriele Basilico
- Kiki Smith
- Thomas Ruff
- Luigi Ghirri
- Manfredi Beninati
- Vanessa Beecroft
- Stefano Arienti
- Francis Alys
- Elisa Caldana
- Ugo Rondinone
- Thomas Schutte
- Francesco Gostoli
- Franklin Evans
- Bruna Esposito
- archives of architects Carlo Scarpa, Aldo Rossi and Pier Luigi Nervi.

== See also ==
- Michele Valori archive
- List of largest art museums

Preceded by Keats–Shelley Memorial House	Landmarks of Rome; MAXXI	Succeeded by Museo Archeologico Ostiense
