= Vesna Pisarović discography =

- Studio albums: 9
- EPs: 1
- Live albums: 1
- Compilation albums: 3
- Singles: 35
- Music videos: 18

Croatian singer-songwriter Vesna Pisarović has released nine studio albums, one live album, one extended play (EP), three compilation albums and 35 singles (including two as a featured artist).

Pisarović's debut studio album Da znaš was released in 2000 and spawned two singles, "Ja čekam noć" and "Da znaš" (a cover of "Non c'è" by Laura Pausini). Her second studio album titled Za tebe stvorena was released in 2001. The album is certified gold in Croatia. Her second studio album spawned five singles "Za tebe stvorena (Tvoja voljena)", "Da je meni (oko moje)", "Ti si samo jedan", "Jutro donosi kraj" and "Da sutra umrem". Kao da je vrijeme... is Pisarović's third studio album and her last to be released through Croatia Records. The record spawned four singles and was certified gold in Croatia.

Pisarović's fourth and fifth album, Pjesma mi je sve and Peti, were released through Hit Records. Pjesma mi je sve is certified silver in Croatia. Peti was Pisarović's last pop record. From 2012 to 2025, Pisarović released four jazz records—With Suspicious Minds (2012), The Great Yugoslav Songbook (2016), Petit Standard (2019) and Poravna (2025)—the most recent of which is infused with Bosnian sevdalinka.

== Albums ==
=== Studio albums ===
Title	Details	Peak chart positions	Certifications
Title	Details	CRO	Certifications
Da znaš	Released: 2000; Formats: CD, cassette, digital download, streaming; Label: Croatia Records	(Note: Top of the Shops was launched in 2002 but a partial archive is only available from 2006 onwards.)	CRO: Silver
Za tebe stvorena	Released: 2001; Formats: CD, cassette, digital download, streaming; Label: Croatia Records	(Note: Top of the Shops was launched in 2002 but a partial archive is only available from 2006 onwards.)	CRO: Gold
Kao da je vrijeme...	Released: 2002; Formats: CD, cassette, digital download, streaming; Label: Croatia Records	(Note: Top of the Shops was launched in 2002 but a partial archive is only available from 2006 onwards.)	CRO: Gold
Pjesma mi je sve	Released: 2003; Formats: CD, cassette, digital download, streaming; Label: Hit Records	(Note: Top of the Shops was launched in 2002 but a partial archive is only available from 2006 onwards.)	CRO: Silver
Peti	Released: 2005; Formats: CD, cassette, digital download, streaming; Label: Hit Records	38	
With Suspicious Minds	Released: 6 June 2012; Formats: CD, digital download, streaming; Label: Jazzwerkstatt	—	
The Great Yugoslav Songbook	Released: 11 November 2016; Formats: CD, digital download, streaming; Label: Jazzwerkstatt, PDV Records	—	
Petit Standard	Released: 28 January 2019; Formats: CD, digital download, streaming; Label: Jazzwerkstatt	—	
Poravna	Released: 6 June 2025; Formats: LP, digital download, streaming; Label: PDV Records	17	

=== Live albums ===
Title	Details	Peak chart positions
Title	Details	CRO
A Fish in My Pocket (with Tristan Honsinger and Gal Furlan)	Released: October 2023; Formats: CD; Label: Klopotec	—

=== Compilation albums ===
Title	Details	Peak chart positions
Title	Details	CRO
Best Of	Released: 2003; Formats: CD, cassette, digital download, streaming; Label: Croatia Records	
The Best Of	Released: 2004; Formats: CD, cassette; Label: City Records	
Najljepše ljubavne pjesme	Released: 2011; Formats: CD, digital download, streaming; Label: Croatia Records	—

== Extended plays ==
Title	Details	Peak chart positions
Title	Details	CRO
Everything I Want	Released: 2003; Formats: CD, cassette; Label: HRT	—

== Singles ==
=== As lead artist ===
Title	Year	Peak chart positions	Album
Title	Year	CRO	Album
"Nema me"	1997	(Note: HR Top 40 was launched on 24 January 2013.)	Zadarfest 1997
"Tako trebaš mi"	1998	(Note: HR Top 40 was launched on 24 January 2013.)	Zlatne žice Slavonije 1998
"Poslije svega"	1999	(Note: HR Top 40 was launched on 24 January 2013.)	Da znaš
"Ja čekam noć"	2000	(Note: HR Top 40 was launched on 24 January 2013.)	Da znaš
"Da znaš"	2000	(Note: HR Top 40 was launched on 24 January 2013.)	Da znaš
"Za tebe stvorena (Tvoja voljena)"	2001	(Note: HR Top 40 was launched on 24 January 2013.)	Za tebe stvorena
"Da je meni (oko moje)"	2001	(Note: HR Top 40 was launched on 24 January 2013.)	Za tebe stvorena
"Ti si samo jedan"	2001	(Note: HR Top 40 was launched on 24 January 2013.)	Za tebe stvorena
"Jutro donosi kraj"	2001	(Note: HR Top 40 was launched on 24 January 2013.)	Za tebe stvorena
"Da sutra umrem"	2001	(Note: HR Top 40 was launched on 24 January 2013.)	Za tebe stvorena
"Sasvim sigurna" / "Everything I Want"	2002	(Note: HR Top 40 was launched on 24 January 2013.)	Kao da je vrijeme...
"Kao da je vrijeme..."	2002	(Note: HR Top 40 was launched on 24 January 2013.)	Kao da je vrijeme...
"Bježi od mene" (with Giuliano)	2002	(Note: HR Top 40 was launched on 24 January 2013.)	Kao da je vrijeme...
"Ivane"	2002	(Note: HR Top 40 was launched on 24 January 2013.)	Kao da je vrijeme...
"Ljubomora"	2003	(Note: HR Top 40 was launched on 24 January 2013.)	Pjesma mi je sve
"Dolje na koljena"	2003	(Note: HR Top 40 was launched on 24 January 2013.)	Pjesma mi je sve
"Spremna sam"	2003	(Note: HR Top 40 was launched on 24 January 2013.)	Pjesma mi je sve
"Doktore"	2004	(Note: HR Top 40 was launched on 24 January 2013.)	Sunčane skale 2004
"Probudi mi ljubav"	2005	(Note: HR Top 40 was launched on 24 January 2013.)	Peti
"Srela sam anđela"	2005	(Note: HR Top 40 was launched on 24 January 2013.)	Peti
"Ti si kriv"	2005	(Note: HR Top 40 was launched on 24 January 2013.)	Peti
"Hipohondar"	2005	(Note: HR Top 40 was launched on 24 January 2013.)	Peti
"Neka ljudi govore"	2006	(Note: HR Top 40 was launched on 24 January 2013.)	Peti
"Ti ne znaš što je ljubav"	2006	(Note: HR Top 40 was launched on 24 January 2013.)	Peti
"Tako mi nedostaješ"	2006	(Note: HR Top 40 was launched on 24 January 2013.)	Peti
"Imam sve, al' tebe ne"	2006	(Note: HR Top 40 was launched on 24 January 2013.)	Zlatne žice Slavonije 2006
"Ljubav je religija" (with Vlado Janevski)	2007	(Note: HR Top 40 was launched on 24 January 2013.)	Non-album single
"Crawfish"	2012	—	With Suspicious Minds
"Balada"	2017	—	Naša velika pjesmarica
"Nogometna utakmica"	2018	—	Naša velika pjesmarica
"Neka ljudi govore" (Remix)	2022	— (Note: "Neka ljudi govore (Remix)" did not enter the HR Top 40, but charted on three regional subcharts. The song peaked at number 87 on the HR Top 100 (Istra i Primorje) chart and at number 85 on the HR Top 100 (Zagreb) and HR Top 100 (Zagorje) charts, respectively.)	Non-album single
"Pokraj Save bagrem drvo raste"	2025	—	Poravna
"Vrbas vodo, što se često mučiš?"	2025	—	Poravna

=== As featured artist ===
Title	Year	Peak chart positions	Album
Title	Year	CRO	Album
"Zažmiri i zaželi" (with Nina Badrić and Kristina Tina Rupčić)	2011	—	Sretan Božić
"Nemam te" (with Matija Dedić)	2021	—	Ladies

== Videography ==
=== Music videos ===
Title	Year	Director(s)	Ref.
"Hipohondar"	2005	Boris Dolenc	
Neka ljudi govore"	2006	Boris Dolenc	
"Crawfish"	2012	Stephane Querrec	
"Balada"	2017	David Tešić	
"Nogometna utakmica"	2018	Zoran Terzić	
"Neka ljudi govore (Remix)"	2022	Filip Koludrović	
