= Rita Pavone (album) =

Studio album by Rita Pavone
- Released: 2 April 1963
- Recorded: 1962–1963
- Genre: Pop; rock; surf
- Length: 30:32
- Label: RCA Italiana

Rita Pavone chronology
Rita Pavone (1963)	Non è facile avere 18 anni (1963)

Singles from Rita Pavone
- 1. "La partita di pallone" Released: 1962; 2. "Come te non c'è nessuno" Released: 1963; 3. "Alla mia età" Released: 1963; 4. "Il ballo del mattone" Released: 1963

Rita Pavone is the self-titled debut studio album by Italian singer Rita Pavone, released on 2 April 1963. The album was the best-selling album of 1963 in Italy.

== Background ==
On 1 September 1962, the singer participated in the first edition of the Festival degli Sconosciuti in Ariccia, which she won by performing "Moliendo Café" and other songs from Mina's repertoire. The patron of the event was Teddy Reno, who would become her mentor and husband six years later. Winning the competition led to an audition with RCA Italiana and immediately secured her a record deal.

From 1963, Pavone reached widespread popularity: already in the early months of the year, her record sales surpassed one million copies.

Indeed, several hugely successful singles were released: "La partita di pallone", which reached the top spot on the charts on 16 February 1963, and remained there for two weeks and "Sul cucuzzolo" (written by Edoardo Vianello); "Alla mia età"; and "Come te non c'è nessuno", which stayed at the top for 9 weeks starting from 2 March, and "Il ballo del mattone", which reached number one on 8 June 1963 and stayed there for three weeks.

During the same period, the artist's fame grew even more due to her regular appearances on the second edition of the variety show Studio Uno. At the time of release, six tracks had already been included on 45-rpm records, while another six songs were previously unreleased.

== Track listing ==
Rita Pavone track listing
No.	Title	Writer(s)	Length
1.	"Abbiamo 16 anni"	Bruno Canfora; Dino Verde	1:55
2.	"La partita di pallone"	Carlo Rossi; Edoardo Vianello	2:10
3.	"Clementine chérie"	Franco Migliacci; Claudio Tallino	1:50
4.	"T'ho conosciuto"	Rossi; Ennio Morricone	2:32
5.	"Sul cucuzzolo"	Rossi; Vianello	2:35
6.	"Le lentiggini"	Canfora; Verde	2:31
7.	"Come te non c'è nessuno"	Migliacci; Oreste Vassallo	2:38
8.	"Pel di carota"	Migliacci; Morricone	2:26
9.	"Alla mia età"	Rossi; Roberto Ferrante	2:23
10.	"La commessa"	Rossi; Piero Piccioni	2:02
11.	"Il ballo del mattone"	Canfora; Verde	2:16
12.	"Amore twist"	Angelo Bovenzi	1:54
Total length:			31:02

== Personnel ==
- Rita Pavone – vocals
- Luis Enriquez Bacalov – orchestra arrangement
- Robby Poitevin – orchestra arrangement
- Ennio Morricone – orchestra arrangement
- I 4 + 4 di Nora Orlandi – backing vocals (tracks A3-A5, B1, B3, B5)
- Gianni Morandi – backing vocals (track A1)
- Coro Franco Potenza – backing vocals (track A5)

== Charts ==
Chart performance for Rita Pavone
Chart (1963–1964)	Peak position
Brazilian Albums (IBOPE)	5
Italian Albums (Musica e dischi)	1
