= Non è facile avere 18 anni =

Studio album by Rita Pavone
- Released: November 1963
- Recorded: 1963
- Genre: Pop; rock; surf
- Length: 29:12
- Label: RCA Italiana

Rita Pavone chronology
Rita Pavone (1963)	Non è facile avere 18 anni (1963)	Gian Burrasca (1964)

Singles from Non è facile avere 18 anni
- 1. "Cuore/Il ballo del mattone" Released: 1963; 2. "Non è facile avere 18 anni/Son finite le vacanze" Released: 1963; 3. "Datemi un martello/Che m'importa del mondo" Released: 1963; 4. "Scrivi!/Ti vorrei parlare" Released: 1964

Non è facile avere 18 anni is the second studio album by Italian singer Rita Pavone, released in November 1963 through RCA Italiana. The album was the second best-selling album in Italy of 1964, and the number-one best-selling album in Brazil of that same year.

== Background ==
During that period, the singer's popularity was on the rise, thanks to numerous hit singles released on 45 RPM records: "Cuore", the Italian version of the U.S. hit written by Barry Mann and Cynthia Weil and performed by Wayne Newton, "Heart (I Hear Your Beating)", which reached number one on 6 July 1963 for nine weeks, "Non è facile avere 18 anni", which reached number one on 25 January 1964 for two weeks, and "Datemi un martello", the Italian adaptation by Sergio Bardotti of "If I Had a Hammer".

The second LP was then released shortly after the first, featuring some of the previously released tracks along with new songs.

The album was released in Italy on LP by RCA Italiana in a mono version with a gatefold cover, catalog number PML 10360. This version was also made available in the United States In 1964, it was reissued in Italy with a jewel case cover, retaining the same catalog number. That same year, it was distributed in South America by RCA Victor, in countries such as France, Venezuela, Peru, Brazil (where it was released under the title, Meus 18 Anos), and Argentina (where it was released as Otra Vez Rita).

== Track listing ==
Non è facile avere 18 anni track listing
No.	Title	Writer(s)	Length
1.	"Non è facile avere 18 anni"	Andrea Bernabini	1:55
2.	"Somigli ad un'oca"	Duane Eddy; Franco Migliacci; Lee Hazlewood	2:10
3.	"Ti vorrei parlare"	Carlo Rossi; Roby Ferrante	1:50
4.	"Se fossi un uomo"	Rossi; Heinz Buchholz; Rudolf-Günter Loose; Werner Müller	2:32
5.	"Quando sogno"	Giuseppe Gallazzi; Jimmy McHugh	2:35
6.	"Cuore"	Rossi; Barry Mann; Cynthia Weil	2:31
7.	"Che m'importa del mondo"	Migliacci; Luis Enriquez Bacalov	2:38
8.	"Son finite le vacanze"	Rossi; Mario Cantini	2:26
9.	"Bianco Natale"	Alberto Curci; Irving Berlin	2:23
10.	"Non c'è un po' di pentimento"	Gianni Meccia	2:02
11.	"Sotto il francobollo"	Rossi; Enriquez	2:16
12.	"Auguri a te"	Rossi; Enriquez	1:54
Total length:			29:12

== Personnel ==
- Rita Pavone – vocals
- Luis Enriquez Bacalov – orchestral arrangement
- Werner Müller – orchestral arrangement
- I 4 + 4 di Nora Orlandi – backing vocals

== Charts ==
Chart performance for Non è facile avere 18 anni
Chart (1963–1965)	Peak position
Brazilian Albums (IBOPE)	1
Italian Albums (Musica e dischi)	1
