= The Great Yugoslav Songbook =

- Naša velika pjesmarica cover

Studio album by Vesna Pisarović
- Released: 11 November 2016
- Recorded: 28–29 November 2015
- Genre: Jazz
- Length: 58:05
- Language: Croatian
- Labels: Jazzwerkstatt; PDV Records
- Producer: Vesna Pisarović

Vesna Pisarović chronology
With Suspicious Minds (2012)	The Great Yugoslav Songbook (2016)	Petit Standard (2019)

Singles from The Great Yugoslav Songbook
- 1. "Balada" Released: 2016; 2. "Bijela lađa plovi morem" Released: 2017; 3. "Nogometna utakmica" Released: 2018

The Great Yugoslav Songbook is the seventh studio album and second jazz album by Croatian singer and songwriter Vesna Pisarović. The album was released in two versions, for international and Croatian market. The international version was released through Jazzwerkstatt on 11 November 2016. The domestic version Naša velika pjesmarica was released through PDV Records on 19 April 2017.

Conceptualized as a satire of the Great American Songbook, the album contains cover versions of popular popular Yugoslav songs from the 1950s, 1960s and early 1970s. In addition to featuring cover versions of Yugoslav songs, Naša velika pjesmarica stands as a significant artistic departure for Vesna Pisarović, marking her return to singing in her native Croatian language.

== Background ==
On 5 June 2012, Vesna Pisarović released her sixth studio album, With Suspicious Minds marking her debut in the jazz genre. This artistic transition marked a significant departure from her previous pop-oriented works and marked the inception of a new phase in her career. The album did not feature any original compositions; instead, they exclusively comprised cover versions of songs originally performed by Elvis Presley. Over the subsequent years, Pisarović actively participated in numerous jazz concerts, with a notable concentration of performances in Germany and Croatia. In late 2015, she initiated the production of her forthcoming second jazz album.

== Recording ==
In a late 2016 interview with tportal, Pisarović disclosed her longstanding ambition to release an album featuring Yugoslav classics, a project she had contemplated for the past decade. She revealed that her pursuit of this endeavor commenced in earnest when she crossed paths with Maja Perfijeva, a Croatian lyricist known for her contributions to some of Indexi's songs.

In contrast to her preceding album, this release was recorded over two studio sessions in November 2015. It features renditions of popular Yugoslav songs from the 1950s, 1960s and early 1970's such as Arsen Dedić, Tereza Kesovija and Indexi. Additionally, this album marked Pisarović's return to singing in her native language, Croatian. The album was recorded in Berlin, where she had been residing for several years. She collaborated with a diverse group of international jazz musicians such as Ulli Blobel during the recording process. In an interview with Ziher.hr, Pisarović elaborated on the selection process for the songs, explaining that "I was looking for songs that immediately resonated with her, without much overthinking. I simply took a song, reharmonized it, and tried singing it".

== Release and promotion ==
The album was released in two distinct versions. The initial version, titled The Great Yugoslav Songbook, made its debut in the German market on 11 November 2016, and was made available in CD, digital, and streaming formats through Jazzwerkstatt. Subsequently, a second edition, titled Naša velika pjesmarica, was released on 17 April 2017, via PDV Records, specifically tailored for the Croatian and ex-Yugoslavian market. Vinyl LPs were also released for the Croatian version in late 2017.

The album's initial single, "Balada," a cover of Indexi's identically titled composition, was released in advance of the album in 2016. "Bijela lađa plovi morem", originally performed by Zvonimir Krkljuš, was released as the album's second single in 2017. Following this, the album's third single, "Nogometna utakmica", a reinterpretation of Rita Pavone's "La partita di pallone", was subsequently released in March 2018.

Between 2017 and 2019, Pisarović actively promoted the album through a series of intimate jazz concerts in both Croatia and Germany. In the promotion of the album, Vesna Pisarović conducted concert tours in several cities, including Rijeka, Osijek, and Zagreb.

== Track listing ==
Credits adapted from AllMusic.

Naša velika pjesmarica
No.	Title	Lyrics	Music	Length
1.	"Bijela lađa plovi morem"	Mario Kinel	Kinel	4:40
2.	"Ti si obala ta"	Zafir Hadžimanov	Aleksandar Ilić	5:28
3.	"Balada"	Maja Perfiljeva	Fadil Redžić	7:11
4.	"Sve što znaš o meni"	Arsen Dedić	Dedić	4:37
5.	"Daleko, daleko"	Dedić	Dedić	3:48
6.	"Ne pali svetla u sumrak"	Drago Britvić	Jože Privšek	4:57
7.	"Moj dilbere"	Traditional	Traditional	5:32
8.	"Nogometna utakmica"	Igor Krimov	Edoardo Vianello	3:28
9.	"Nemam te"	Perfiljeva	Đelo Jusić	4:20
10.	"Tiha tugo moja"	Perfiljeva	Đorđe Novković	3:18
11.	"Zvižduk u osam"	Darko Kraljić	Kraljić	3:39
12.	"Svemu dođe kraj"	Alfi Kabiljo	Kabiljo	4:29
13.	"Idem i ja... Ne, ti ne!"	Ivica Krajač	Enzo Jannacci	2:36

Notes

- "Bijela lađa plovi morem" is a cover of the 1955 song of the same name, performed by Zvonimir Krkljuš.
- "Ti si obala ta" is a cover of the 1974 song of the same name, performed by Bisera Veletanlić.
- "Balada" is a cover of the 1972 song of the same name, performed by Indexi.
- "Sve što znaš o meni" is a cover of the 1969 song of the same name, written and performed by Arsen Dedić.
- "Daleko, daleko" is a cover of the 1967 song of the same name, written and performed by Arsen Dedić.
- "Ne pali svetla u sumrak" is a cover of the 1962 song of the same name, performed by Lola Novaković.
- "Nogometna utakmica" is a cover of the 1963 song of the same name, performed by Beti Jurković; which itself is a Croatian-language cover of "La partita di pallone" (1962), penned by Carlo Rossi and composed by Vianello, and performed by Rita Pavone.
- "Nemam te" is a cover of the 1987 song of the same name, performed by Tereza Kesovija.
- "Tiha tugo moja" is a cover of the 1974 song of the same name, performed by Dalibor Brun.
- "Zvižduk u osam" is a cover of the 1959 song of the same name, performed by Đorđe Marjanović.
- "Svemu dođe kraj" is a cover of the 1967 song of the same name, performed by Beti Jurković.
- "Idem i ja... Ne, ti ne!" is a cover of the 1968 song of the same name, performed by Kvartet 4M; which itself is a cover of "Vengo anch'io. No, tu no" (1967), written by Dario Fo, Jannacci and Fiorenzo Fiorentini, and performed by Jannaci.

== Personnel ==
Credits adapted from Amazon Music.

- Vesna Pisarović – Vocals
- Chris Abrahams – Piano
- Greg Cohen – Double Bass
- Tony Buck – Drums
- Francesco Bigoni – Saxophone
- Gerhard Gschlößl – Trombone
- Dieb13 – Turntables, Sampler
- Walter Quintus – Mixing, Mastering

== Release history ==
Release formats for The Great Yugoslav Songbook
Country	Date	Format	Version	Label	Ref.
Various	11 November 2016	Digital download; streaming; CD	International	Jazzwerkstat	
Croatia	19 April 2017	Digital download; streaming; vinyl; CD	Naša velika pjesmarica	PDV Records	
