= Fortissimo (song) =

Single by Rita Pavone

from the album Rita la zanzara
- B-side: "La sai troppo lunga"
- Released: 1966
- Genre: Pop, Ballad
- Label: RCA Italiana
- Songwriter(s): Bruno Canfora, Lina Wertmüller
- Producer(s): Teddy Reno

Rita Pavone singles chronology
"Qui ritornerà" (1966)	"Fortissimo" (1966)	"La zanzara" (1966)

Audio
- "Fortissimo" on YouTube

"Fortissimo" is a 1966 song brought to success by Rita Pavone. The music was composed by Bruno Canfora, while the lyrics were written by director and screenwriter Lina Wertmüller, at the time a close collaborator of Pavone, after having directed her in the television miniseries Il giornalino di Gian Burrasca and in the musicarello film Rita the Mosquito. The arrangements of the song are by Luis Bacalov.

"Fortissimo" was chosen as the opening song of the popular RAI variety show Studio Uno, whose 1966 edition Pavone presented, alternating with Mina, Ornella Vanoni and Sandra Milo.

The song was later covered by several artists, including Mina, Iva Zanicchi, Robert Goulet, Betty Madigan, Laura Bono, Nathalie.

== Track listing ==
7" single – PM45 3366

1. "Fortissimo" (Bruno Canfora, Lina Wertmüller) – 2:34
2. "La sai troppo lunga" (Carlo Claroni, Enrico Ciacci) – 2:48

== Charts ==
=== Weekly charts ===
Chart (1966–67)	Peak position
Italy (Musica e dischi)	11

=== Year-end charts ===
Chart (1966)	Peak position
Italy (Musica e dischi)	55
