= Don't Sting the Mosquito =

1967 film

- Directed by: Lina Wertmüller
- Written by: Lina Wertmüller
- Cinematography: Dario Di Palma
- Edited by: Franco Fraticelli
- Music by: Bruno Canfora
- Release date: 24 March 1967
- Country: Italy
- Language: Italian

Don't Sting the Mosquito (Italian: Non stuzzicate la zanzara) is a 1967 Italian "musicarello" film directed by Lina Wertmüller (under the stage name George H. Brown). It is the sequel of Rita the Mosquito.

== Plot ==
Rita, who ran away from boarding school after winning a singing contest, arrives in Rome with the help of Paolo, her music teacher. They find themselves at Fortezza Colleoni, where her parents live with three aunts. Her father runs an academy for aspiring "Swiss guards" awaiting recognition. Wanting to stay close to Rita, Paolo joins the academy. However, they both seek a new chance at fame by attempting to participate in a TV show in Sestriere. Rita's father thwarts their plans by locking her up, but she escapes with her mother's help. Together, they head to Sestriere. When her father realizes the escape, he kidnaps Rita. Yet, her mother steps in to take Rita's place in the TV show, allowing Rita and Paolo to pursue their dreams of music and love.

== Cast ==
- Rita Pavone: Rita Santangelo
- Giancarlo Giannini: Paolo Randi
- Giulietta Masina: Maria Cristina
- Romolo Valli: Bartolomeo Santangelo
- Peppino De Filippo: Carmelo
- Enrico Viarisio: General
- Mita Medici: Vanessa
- Raffaele Pisu: Sergeant
- Giusi Raspani Dandolo: Director
- Caterina Boratto: Marchesa Filangeri
- Ugo Fangareggi: Wolfang
- Teddy Reno: Himself
- Pietro De Vico
