= Rita the Mosquito =

1966 film

- Directed by: Lina Wertmüller
- Written by: Sergio Bonotti; Lina Wertmüller
- Starring: Rita Pavone; Bice Valori; Giancarlo Giannini; Turi Ferro; Vittorio Congia; Tanya Lopert; Gino Bramieri; Laura Efrikian; Nino Taranto; Peppino De Filippo
- Cinematography: Dario Di Palma
- Edited by: Franco Fraticelli
- Music by: Bruno Canfora
- Release date: 30 September 1966
- Country: Italy
- Language: Italian

Rita the Mosquito (Italian: Rita la zanzara) is a 1966 Italian musical comedy film directed by Lina Wertmüller (under the stage name George H. Brown). It has a sequel, Don't Sting the Mosquito.

== Cast ==
- Rita Pavone: Rita
- Giancarlo Giannini: Professor Paolo Randi
- Peppino De Filippo: Carmelo
- Nino Taranto: Director of education
- Turi Ferro: Sicilian professor
- Bice Valori: Luigina
- Laura Efrikian: Lili
- Tanya Lopert: Lida
- Vittorio Congia: Ciccio
- Giusi Raspani Dandolo: "Catherine Spaak"
- Paolo Panelli: Peppino
- Gino Bramieri: Drunkard
- Milena Vukotic: Dance instructor
- Ugo Fangareggi: Wolfgang
- Teddy Reno: Himself
- Silvia Dionisio: Collettina
