= Ugo Moretti =

Italian novelist, journalist and art critic

Ugo Moretti (Orvieto, 1918 – Rome, 11 January 1991) was an Italian novelist, journalist, art critic and screenwriter. He was one of the leading figures of neorealism and postwar Roman intellectual life.

== Life ==
=== 1949: Vento caldo ===
Ugo Moretti had an obscure career, despite a promising debut with Vento caldo (English title: Rogue Wind), which won the Viareggio Prize for Poetry in a tie in 1949 and was later translated in eight countries. This novel has been described as "the story of a Harlequin-like young man making a precarious living in Mussolini's Italy".

=== The 1950s ===
In the 1950s, Moretti headed the art gallery Il Pincio in Rome around Via Margutta and Via del Babuino and was "a key presence in the Roman bohemian "Dolce vita" of the 1950s".

His second work is the auto-biographic short story collection Gente al Babuino (1955). It was turned into the film Run with the Devil in 1960.

In the late 1950s, and alongside the novels published under his own name, Moretti wrote crime novels, so-called gialli, under pseudonyms such as Maurice Gouttier, Victor Drug and George Sherman,. The first, Nuda corre la morte (1957), originated from Moretti's bet with the publisher "that a writer can pen any kind of story, just like a painter can draw a battle scene or a fairy tale illustration; therefore, he could crank out a giallo novel with some predetermined elements (including a naked woman running in the street, hence the title) in one week", which resulted in him winning the bet.

His last giallo and masterpiece in this field was Doppia morte al Governo Vecchio, which was published under his own name in 1960. Roberto Curti noted its "witty depiction of a daydreaming, absent-minded cop who is intrinsically neurotic (to the point that, unbeknownst to his wife, he leads a double life as a painter to escape from his monotonous routine, mingling with the Roman lowlifes)". In 1977, this novel was turned into the film Double Murder directed by Stefano Vanzina. Moretti's authorship of the aforementioned gialli became known in 1990 following a revival of this novel.

=== From 1960 to his death ===
Regarding his role in the cultural world of the 1960s and 1970s, Moretti has been described as a "countercurrent figure".

Peaking in the 1960s, but starting already in the 1950s and through till the 1980s, Moretti collaborated on numerous screenplays. In 1965, Moretti also had a small acting role in the film Con rispetto parlando. He wrote his last screenplay for Joe D'Amato's erotic drama film The Alcove in 1985.

Moretti also continued to write fiction and poetry up until the early 1990s both under pseudonyms and under his own name, some of it pornographic, such as Erosparty (1976).

== Works ==
=== Novels and poetry ===
- Vento caldo (Trevi, Rome, 1949; readerforblind, Roma, 2021, with a foreword by Marco Lupo); English translation: Rogue Wind (Prentice-Hall, 1953)
- Gente al Babuino (Vallecchi, Florence, 1955); English translation by William Weaver under the titles Artists in Rome: Tales of the Babuino (1958, Macmillan) and A Street in Rome (1962, Ace)
- Fortuna di notte (Vallecchi, Florence, 1958)
- Doppia morte al Governo Vecchio (Rome, 1960; Longanesi, 1977; Bariletti, Rome, 1990, with a foreword by Maurizio Costanzo)
- Nuda ogni giorno (Canesi, Rome, 1961)
- Nuda ogni sera (Canesi, Rome, 1961)
- Natale in casa d'appuntamento (1963)
- La maglia arancione (Kermesse, Milan, 1971)
- Le poesie (private edition, Rome, 1973), a collection of Moretti's poetry
- Ritratto d'amante (1975), a collection of 29 erotic poems
- Erosparty (1976), a pornographic novel
- Champagne di mattina (Trevi, Rome, 1979)
- La ragazza con la bicicletta. Racconti partigiani (Carucci, Rome, 1982)
- Gli ippogrifi (Edizioni Beta, Rome, 1986)
- 69 Images par tous (Edizione del Giano, 1987)
- Il gabbiano nero (Bariletti, Rome, 1991, with a foreword by Maurizio Costanzo)

=== Crime novels ("gialli") ===
- Nuda corre la morte (1957) as Ugo Moretti
- Un cadavere da mezzo milliardo (Alastor, Rome, 1957) as Maurice Gouttier
- Contro la Rossa la ragion non vale (Alastor, Rome, 1957) as Maurice Gouttier
- Un cinese all'inferno (Alastor, Rome, 1957) as Victor Drug
- Contratto mortale (Alastor, Rome, 1957) as George Sherman
- Assassinio per appuntamento (Gialli T.L., 1958) as Victor Drug
- Sangue sulla Eiffel (Gialli T.L., 1958) as Maurice Gouttier
- La porta dipinta di rosso (Gialli T.L., 1958) as Victor Drug
- Un demonio corre a Brooklyn (Gialli T.L., 1958) as George Sherman
- La Pietra di Paragone (Gialli Vietati, Florence, 1959) as George Sherman
- Un morto da ammazzare (Gialli Vietati, Florence, 1959) as Victor Drug
- La morte non vuole Marimba (Gialli Vietati, Florence, 1959) as George Sherman
- Bionda al cianuro (Gialli Vietati, Florence, 1960) as Victor Drug
- Doppia morte al governo vecchio (1960) as Ugo Moretti

=== Works as journalist ===
- Più che donna (terza pagina, 1968), a non-fiction work on lesbianism
- Etiopia, Eritrea, Costa dei Somali. La lotta dei popoli del Corno d'Africa (Città futura. Mensile d'informazione politica, V, 5, May 1973)

=== Screenplays and stories for the cinema ===
- Viva la rivista! (1953), story and screenplay with Giovanni Gigliozzi, Sergio Tesei, Enzo Trapani and Piero Vivarelli
- Slave Women of Corinth (1958), screenplay with Mario Bonnard, Sergio Leone and Mario di Nardo
- Devil's Cavaliers (1959), dialogue only with Jean Blondel
- Scano Boa (1961), screenplay with four other writers
- Gioventù di notte (1961), screenplay with Mariano Bonelli and Daniel Wronecki, based on Moretti's own 1961 novel Nuda ogni giorno
- L'ultima carica (1964), screenplay with Nicola Manzari
- L'uomo di Toledo (1965), story on his own, and screenplay with Eugenio Martín and A. Zound Jr.
- Rita the American Girl (1967), screenplay with Tito Carpi, Luciano Gregoretti and Bruno Corbucci
- Her Harem (1967), story only with Rafael Azcona and Marco Ferreri
- Orgasmo (1969), screenplay with Umberto Lenzi and Marie Claire Sollenville
- Battle of the Commandos (1969), dialogue only
- Il Decamerone proibito (1972), story with Carlo Infascelli loosely adapted from The Decameron, screenplay with Carlo Infascelli, Mario Amendola and Antonio Racioppi
- Le mille e una notte all'italiana (1972), story and screenplay together with Mario Amendola, Fiorenzo Fiorentini, Vinicio Marinucci and Antonio Racioppi
- The Black Hand (1973), screenplay with Vinicio Marinucci, Aldo Marcovecchio, Luigi Cozzi and Antonio Racioppi
- La belva dalla calda pelle (1981), screenplay with Bruno Fontana
- The Alcove (1985), story and screenplay on his own

=== Films based on his novels ===
- Run with the Devil (Italian title: Via Margutta, 1960), based on Moretti's second novel Gente al Babuino (1955)
- Gioventù di notte (1961), based on his 1961 novel Nuda ogni giorno
- Natale in casa d'appuntamento (1976), based on his 1963 novel
- Double Murder (Italian title: Doppio delitto, 1977), loosely based on his 1960 novel Doppia morte al Governo Vecchio

=== As actor ===
- Con rispetto parlando (1965)

=== Works as an art presenter and critic ===
- Squitieri (Edizioni Mediterranee, Rome, 1971), with Montanelli, Berto and Selvatico Estense
- Idro Lazzerini (Rome, 1972; exhibition at the Galleria l'Albatros, Via del Babuino 169)
- Rodolfo Zito (L. Spinelli, 1972)
- Bruno Guidi (Rome, 1972; exhibition at the Galleria Il Grifo)
- Ida Salustri (Ediarte, Milan, 1974)
- Marino Haupt (IED, Rome, 1976; exhibition at the Galleria L'indicatore d'arte contemporanea)
- Carlo Roselli (Edizioni S.I.R.I.S., Rome, 1984)
- Guido Razzi (Rome, 1985)
- ……dell'acqua, della terra e dell'amore…… Nino La Barbera (Tipografia Di Lauro, Rome, 1986), with Vanni Ronsisvalle and Ferruccio Ulivi
- Duccio. Testo di Ugo Moretti (Rome, 1988; exhibition at the Palazzo Valentini)
- La musica nella pittura di Vittorio Piccinini. Opere esposte all'Accademia di Santa Cecilia nella mostra. Omaggio a Leonard Bernstein (Eurosia, 1989)
- Fabio Piscopo. Della libertà del corpo: sensazioni sul calcio (1990) with Andrea Pesciarelli
- Franco Onali (Arezzo, 1990, Galleria Comunale d'Arte Contemporanea), with Antonello Trombadori
