= La partita di pallone =

Single by Rita Pavone

from the album Rita Pavone
- Language: Italian
- B-side: "Amore twist"
- Released: 1962
- Genre: pop
- Length: 2 minutes
- Label: RCA Italiana
- Songwriters: Edoardo Vianello, Carlo Rossi
- Producer: Teddy Reno

Rita Pavone singles chronology
"La partita di pallone" (1962)	"Come te non c'è nessuno" (1963)

Audio
- "La partita di pallone" on YouTube

"La partita di pallone" (transl. "The soccer game") is a 1962 pop song composed by Edoardo Vianello (music) and Carlo Rossi (lyrics), arranged by Luis Bacalov and performed by Rita Pavone. The song was Pavone's first single, released shortly after her Festival degli sconosciuti victory, and was a huge success, effectively launching her career. The single sold over one million copies and was awarded a gold disc.

Artists who also recorded the song include Dalida, Amanda Lear, Nora Nova, Los TNT, Cocky Mazzetti.

== Track listing ==
No.	Title	Writer(s)	Length
1.	"La partita di pallone"	Edoardo Vianello, Carlo Rossi	2:11
2.	"Amore twist"	Angelo Bovenzi	1:53

== Charts ==
Chart (1963)	Peak position
Argentina (CAPIF)	7
Italy (Musica e dischi)	2
