= Abbronzatissima =

Single by Edoardo Vianello

from the album Io sono Edoardo Vianello
- B-side: "Il Cicerone"
- Released: 1963
- Genre: Pop
- Length: 2:29
- Label: RCA
- Songwriters: Edoardo Vianello and Carlo Rossi

Edoardo Vianello singles chronology
"Ti amo perché" (1962)	"Abbronzatissima" (1963)	"I Watussi" (1963)

"Abbronzatissima" (pronounced [abbrondzaˈtissima]; Italian for "Very tanned") is a song composed by Edoardo Vianello and Carlo Rossi, and performed by Vianello. Ennio Morricone served as arranger. The single, considered an instant classic in Italy, peaked for two weeks at the first place of the Italian hit parade and sold over 6.5 million copies.

== Track listing ==
- 7" single – PM45-3200
1. "Abbronzatissima" (Edoardo Vianello, Carlo Rossi) – 2:29
2. "Il cicerone" (Edoardo Vianello, Carlo Rossi) – 2:28

== Certifications ==
Region	Certification	Certified units/sales
Italy (FIMI) Sales from 2009	Gold	50,000^{‡}
^{‡} Sales+streaming figures based on certification alone.
