= The Crazy Kids of the War =

- Directed by: Steno
- Written by: Castellano & Pipolo
- Starring: Rita Pavone; Terence Hill; Aroldo Tieri; Jess Hahn
- Cinematography: Riccardo Pallottini
- Music by: Berto Pisano
- Release date: 22 December 1967
- Running time: 110 minute
- Countries: Italy; France
- Language: Italian

The Crazy Kids of the War (Italian: La Feldmarescialla, French: La grosse pagaille) is a 1967 Italian-French "musicarello" film directed by Steno.

== Cast ==
- Rita Pavone: Rita
- Terence Hill: Professor Giuliano Fineschi
- Francis Blanche: Captain Hans Vogel
- Aroldo Tieri: Major Kurt von Braun
- Jess Hahn: Major Peter Hawkins
- Teddy Reno: Father Sevatino
- Michel Modo: Fritz, Vogel's Assistant
- Giampiero Littera: Michele
- Giovanni Cianfriglia: German soldier

== See also ==
- List of Italian films of 1967
