= Laura Bono =

Italian pop-rock singer-songwriter

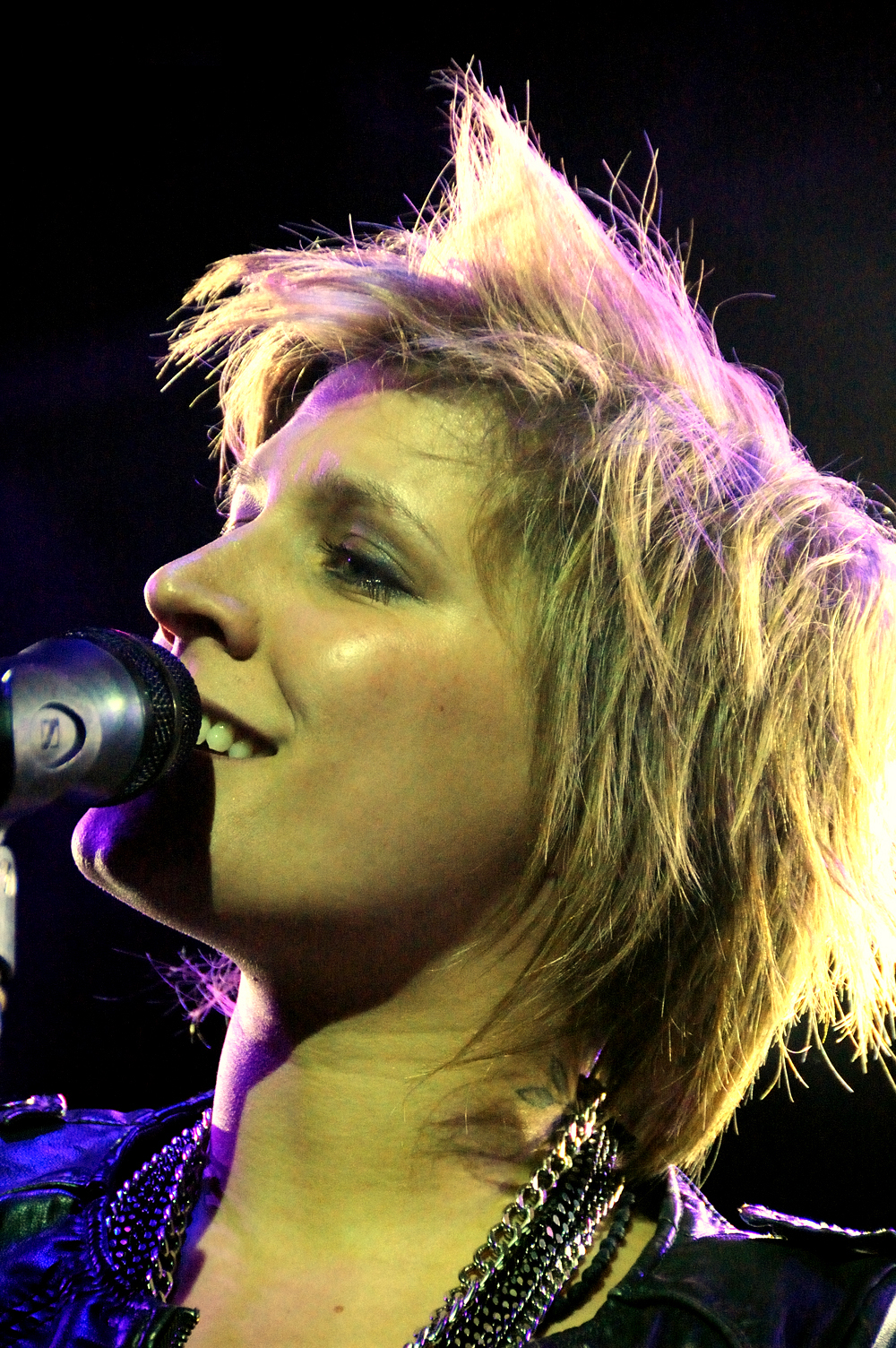
- Born: 14 January 1979 (age 46); Varese, Italy
- Occupation: singer-songwriter

Laura Bono (born 14 January 1979) is an Italian pop-rock singer-songwriter.

== Background ==
Born in Varese as Laura Bonometti, at very young age Bono started composing songs, making live performances in clubs and entering musical competitions for newcomers. The success came in 2005, when Bono won the "new artists" section of the Sanremo Music Festival with the song "Non credo nei miracoli". Outside of Italy, her first album had a significant success in Finland, where it entered the top ten; in Finland Bono also recorded a duet with Tomi Metsäketo, "Oggi ti amo", and she participated at the opening ceremony of the World Athletics Championships which were held in Helsinki in August 2005.

In 2006 Bono recorded the Spanish version of her debut album and was finalist in the musical show Music Farm. In 2010 her song "Tra noi l'immensità", first single of her third album La mia discreta compagnia, was chosen as the theme song of a Telecom commercial. In 2013, after a three-year hiatus, she released the single "Fortissimo", a cover version of a Rita Pavone hit.

== Discography ==
Album

- 2005 - Laura Bono
- 2008 - S'intitola così
- 2010 - La mia discreta compagnia
- 2015 – Segreto

Awards and achievements
Preceded by Dolcenera with "Siamo tutti là fuori"	Sanremo Music Festival; Winner Newcomers section 2005	Succeeded by Riccardo Maffoni with "Sole negli occhi"
