= Con rispetto parlando =

1965 film

- Directed by: Marcello Ciorciolini
- Written by: Marcello Ciorciolini
- Produced by: Antonio Colantuoni
- Starring: Scilla Gabel; Aroldo Tieri
- Cinematography: Oberdan Troiani
- Music by: Riz Ortolani
- Production company: Turris Film
- Distributed by: Variety Distribution
- Release date: 1965
- Running time: 97 minutes
- Country: Italy
- Language: Italian

Con rispetto parlando is a 1965 Italian black tragicomedy film written and directed by Marcello Ciorciolini for Turris Film. It stars Aroldo Tieri, Scilla Gabel, Renzo Palmer, Giusi Raspani Dandolo and Carlo Giuffrè.

== Plot ==
A girl returns to her home town to attend the funeral of the mayor. During the proceedings she witnesses the insincerity of the attendees, who use the event for their own political gain. The funeral turns into an election campaign event.

== Cast ==
- Aroldo Tieri
- Scilla Gabel
- Umberto D'Orsi
- Ugo Moretti
- Dominique Boschero
- Katina Ranieri
- Carlo Giuffrè
- Enzo Andronico
- Angelo Infanti
- Renzo Palmer
- Giusi Raspani Dandolo
- Carlo Sposito
- Nino Terzo
- Luca Sportelli

== Production ==
The film was directed and written by Marcello Ciorciolini and produced by Antonio Colantuoni for Turris Film. Cinematographer Oberdan Trojani was hired to shoot the film, working with Giuseppe Ranieri. The score was composed by Riz Ortolani, and features the song "Giostra della vita", which was sung by Katyna Ranieri.
