= Come te non c'è nessuno =

Single by Rita Pavone

from the album Rita Pavone
- B-side: "Clementine chérie"
- Released: May 1963
- Genre: pop
- Label: RCA Italiana
- Songwriters: Franco Migliacci; Oreste Vassallo
- Producer: Luis Bacalov

Rita Pavone singles chronology
"La partita di pallone" (1962)	"Come te non c'è nessuno" (1963)	"Alla mia età" (1963)

"Come te non c'è nessuno" (transl. "There is nobody like you") is a song notably performed by Rita Pavone.

== Track listing ==
No.	Title	Writer(s)	Length
1.	"Come te non c'è nessuno"	Franco Migliacci, Oreste Vassallo	2:38
2.	"Clémentine Chérie"	Migliacci, Claudio Tallino	1:52

== Charts ==
Chart (1963–1964)	Peak position
Argentina (CAPIF)	5
Italy (Musica e dischi)	1
Spain (AFYVE)	6
