= Cuore (song) =

Single by Rita Pavone

from the album Non è facile avere 18 anni
- B-side: "Il ballo del mattone"
- Released: June 1963
- Recorded: 1963
- Genre: pop
- Label: RCA Italiana
- Songwriter(s): Barry Mann; Cynthia Weil; Carlo Rossi
- Producer(s): Luis Bacalov

Rita Pavone singles chronology
"Alla mia età" (1963)	"Cuore" (1963)	"Datemi un martello" (1963)

"Cuore" (transl. "Heart") (originally in English as "Heart (I Hear You Beating)" by Barry Mann and Cynthia Weil) is a song performed by Rita Pavone, written by Carlo Rossi. It was the best-selling song in Italy in 1963, and is considered to be one of, if not, the most well-known song of Pavone's career.

Pavone recorded the song in English, French and Spanish.

== Track listing ==
No.	Title	Writer(s)	Length
1.	"Cuore"	Barry Mann, Cynthia Weil, Carlo Rossi	2:25
2.	"Il ballo del mattone"	Bruno Canfora, Dino Verde	2:16

== Charts ==
Chart (1963–67)	Peak position
Argentina (CAPIF)	1
Belgium (Ultratop 50 Wallonia)	48
Brazil (IBOPE)	15
Italy (Musica e dischi)	1
Spain (AFYVE)	1
Switzerland (Schweiz Hitparade)	10
UK Singles (OCC)	27
West Germany (Media Control)	48
