= With Suspicious Minds =

Studio album by Vesna Pisarović
- Released: 5 June 2012
- Recorded: 2011–12;
- Genre: Jazz
- Length: 49:24
- Language: English
- Label: Jazzwerkstatt
- Producer: Vesna Pisarović

Vesna Pisarović chronology
Najljepše ljubavne pjesme (2011)	With Suspicious Minds (2012)	The Great Yugoslav Songbook (2016)

Singles from With Suspicious Minds
- 1. "Crawfish" Released: 17 September 2012

With Suspicious Minds is the sixth studio album by Croatian singer and songwriter Vesna Pisarović, globally released on 6 June 2012 by Jazzwerkstatt. It is her first album to be primarily recorded in English. After the release of her fifth studio album Peti, she felt the need to grow artistically and release a jazz album. The album features fifteen cover versions of popular songs originally performed by Elvis Presley.

== Background ==
Pisarović's last studio album Peti was released in late 2005 through Hit Records. After the album release, Pisarović announced on her website that she would go on an indefinite hiatus to pursue an academic career. She enrolled in the Royal Conservatory of The Hague. She later moved to Berlin, where the recording process of With Suspicious Minds started. According to Pisarović the main inspiration for the album was to "not change the musical texture of the songs but to explore Elvis' musical roots with an ironic approach."

== Track listing ==
Credits adapted from AllMusic.

With Suspicious Minds
No.	Title	Writer(s)	Length
1.	"Always on My Mind"	Wayne Carson, Johnny Christopher, Mark James	5:00
2.	"Big Boss Man"	Luther Dixon, Al Smith	2:57
3.	"Trouble"	Jerry Leiber and Mike Stoller	2:06
4.	"Love Letters"	Edward Heyman, Victor Young	3:56
5.	"Crawfish"	Fred Wise, Ben Weisman	4:06
6.	"I Feel So Bad"	Chuck Willis	3:51
7.	"In My Way"	Wise, Weisman	3:47
8.	"See See Rider"	Ma Rainey, Lena Arant	1:52
9.	"Are You Lonesome Tonight?"	Lou Handman, Roy Turk	4:43
10.	"Blue Moon"	Lorenz Hart, Richard Rodgers	3:10
11.	"Can't Help Falling in Love"	Hugo Peretti, Luigi Creatore, George David Weiss	3:16
12.	"Guitar Man"	Jerry Reed	2:45
13.	"Heartbreak Hotel"	Mae Boren Axton, Thomas Durden	2:14
14.	"Mystery Train"	Junior Parker	3:06
15.	"Love Me Tender"	George R. Poulton, Ken Darby, Elvis Presley, Vera Matson	2:35
Total length:			49:24

== Release history ==
Region	Date	Format	Label	Ref.
Various	5 June 2012	CD; digital download; streaming	Jazzwerkstatt	
