= The Black Hand (1973 film) =

The Black Hand (The Birth of the Mafia)
- Directed by: Antonio Racioppi
- Screenplay by: Vincio Marinucci; Aldo Marcovecchio; Ugo Moretti; Luigi Cozzi; Antonio Raciopi
- Story by: Carlo Infascelli
- Produced by: Carlo Infascelli
- Starring: Lionel Stander; Rosanna Fratello; Michele Placido; Corrado Gaipa
- Cinematography: Riccardo Pallottini
- Edited by: Cleote Conversi
- Music by: Carlo Rustichelli
- Production company: In.Ci.S Film
- Distributed by: Roma Film
- Release date: March 16, 1973 (Italy)
- Running time: 90 minutes
- Country: Italy
- Language: Italian
- Box office: ₤230.363 million

The Black Hand (The Birth of the Mafia) (Italian: La mano nera) is a 1973 Italian crime film written and directed by Antonio Racioppi and starring Lionel Stander, Rosanna Fratello and Michele Placido.

== Plot ==
Italian-American cop Joe Petrosino infiltrates the Mafia in the early 1900s New York.

== Cast ==
- Lionel Stander as Lt. Joe Petrosino
- Rosanna Fratello as Angela
- Michele Placido as Antonio Turris
- Corrado Gaipa as Avvocato
- Luigi Pistilli as Don Nunzio Pantaleo
- Philippe Leroy as The Professor
- Roger Browne as State Attorney
- Nino Vingelli as Don Gaetano
- Annie Carol Edel as Mary
- Mario Frera as Don Salvatore
- Gilberto Galimberti as Tano Massara
- Gianni Manera as Berto
- Giacomo Rizzo as Nicola Gerace
- Salvatore Billa as Hechman

== Production ==
Luigi Cozzi, one of the nine credited screenwriters on the film that producer Carlo Infascelli wanted to change the script depending on the actors demands. For example, Cozzi claims that Infascelli had to change the film per Phillipe Leroy's request. Cozzi noted that he was phoned by Infascelli and was told to change the scenes per Leroy's demands within 24 hours. Cozzi noted he was often phoned and told to find reasons and ways things changed.

== Release ==
The Black Hand was released in Italy on March 16, 1973 where it was distributed theatrically by Roma Film. The film grossed 230.363 million Italian lira on its theatrical run.

== Reception ==
John Raisback of the Monthly Film Bulletin reviewed an 85-minute dubbed version of the film, finding it having a "rambling plot line" and that large portions of the dubbed dialogue were lifted straight from The Godfather.

== Remake ==
In 2017, Paramount announced that it has acquired the movie rights for an English language adaptation. The new film, due for release in 2018, will star Leonardo DiCaprio as Joe, and will be partly based on Stephan Talty's upcoming novelization of Petrosino's assassination.
