= Sanremo Music Festival 2005 =

Italian song contest (55th edition)

Dates and venue
- Semi-final 1: 1 March 2005
- Semi-final 2: 2 March 2005
- Semi-final 3: 3 March 2005
- Semi-final 4: 4 March 2005
- Final: 5 March 2005
- Venue: Teatro Ariston; Sanremo, Italy

Production
- Broadcaster: Radiotelevisione italiana (RAI)
- Director: Stefano Vicario
- Artistic director: Paolo Bonolis, Gianmarco Mazzi
- Presenters: Paolo Bonolis and Antonella Clerici, Federica Felini

Big Artists section
- Number of entries: 20
- Winner: "Angelo"; Francesco Renga

Newcomers' section
- Number of entries: 12
- Winner: "Non credo nei miracoli" Laura Bono

The Sanremo Music Festival 2005 (Italian: Festival di Sanremo 2005), officially the 55th Italian Song Festival (55º Festival della canzone italiana), was the 55th annual Sanremo Music Festival, held at the Teatro Ariston in Sanremo between 1 and 5 March 2005 and broadcast by Radiotelevisione italiana (RAI). The show was presented by Paolo Bonolis, supported by Antonella Clerici and Federica Felini. Bonolis and Gianmarco Mazzi served as the artistic directors.

According to the rules of this edition, the participants were divided into five categories (Men, Women, Groups, Classic and Newcomers), with only three entries for each category advancing to the finals and with the winners of each category eventually competing for the first place. The winner of the main competition was Francesco Renga with the song "Angelo", while Nicola Arigliano won the Critics Award with the song "Colpevole". Laura Bono won the Newcomers section with "Non credo nei miracoli".

In addition to musical guests, the guests of this edition also included Will Smith, Hugh Grant, Mike Tyson, Christian De Sica.

== Participants and results ==
=== Men ===
Men's section
Song	Artist(s)	Songwriter(s)	Rank	Notes
"Angelo"	Francesco Renga	Francesco Renga; Maurizio Zappatini	1	Winner of the main competition; Winner of the "Men" section
"L'amore che non c'è"	Gigi D'Alessio	Gigi D'Alessio; Vincenzo D'Agostino	2	
"Nel mondo dei sogni"	Marco Masini	Marco Masini; Giuseppe Dati; Goffredo Orlandi	3	
"Non capiva che l'amavo"	Paolo Meneguzzi	Paolo Meneguzzi; Rosario Di Bella; Dino Melotti	Eliminated	
"Le parole"	Umberto Tozzi	Umberto Tozzi; Riccardo Ancillotti	Eliminated	

=== Women ===
Women's section
Song	Artist(s)	Songwriter(s)	Rank	Notes
"Echi d'infinito"	Antonella Ruggiero	Mario Venuti; Kaballà	1	Winner of the "Women" section
"Da grande"	Alexia	Alexia Aquilani; Maurizio Fabrizio; Guido Ciminotti; Giuseppe Fulcheri; Celso Valli	2	
"Ragazza di periferia"	Anna Tatangelo	Gigi D'Alessio; Vincenzo D'Agostino; Adriano Pennino	3	
"Fammi entrare"	Marina Rei	Marina Rei; Daniele Sinigallia	Eliminated	
"A modo mio"	Paola e Chiara	Paola Iezzi; Chiara Iezzi	Eliminated	

=== Groups ===
Groups section
Song	Artist(s)	Songwriter(s)	Rank	Notes
"Che mistero è l'amore"	Nicky Nicolai & Stefano Di Battista Jazz Quartet	Pino Marino; Giancarlo Lucariello; Maurizio Fabrizio	1	Winner of the "Groups" section
"Ovunque andrò"	Le Vibrazioni	Francesco Sarcina	2	
"Grido d'amore"	Matia Bazar	Giancarlo Golzi; Piero Cassano	3	
"Francesca"	DJ Francesco Band	Alberto Rapetti; Francesco Facchinetti; Davide Primiceri	Eliminated	
"Dovevo dirti molte cose (amore)"	Velvet	Velvet; Sgreccia	Eliminated	

=== Classic ===
Classic section
Song	Artist(s)	Songwriter(s)	Rank	Notes
"Come noi nessuno al mondo"	Toto Cutugno ft. Annalisa Minetti	Toto Cutugno	1	Winner of the "Classic" section
"Uomo bastardo"	Marcella Bella	Stefano Pieroni; Gianni Bella	2	
"La panchina"	Peppino di Capri	Depsa; Giuseppe Faiella; Christian Piccinelli	3	
"Colpevole"	Nicola Arigliano	Franco Fasano; Gianfranco Grottoli; Andrea Vaschetti	Eliminated	Winner of the Mia Martini critics award
"Non escludo il ritorno"	Franco Califano	Federico Zampaglione; Franco Califano	Eliminated	

=== Newcomers ===
Newcomers section
Song	Artist(s)	Songwriter(s)	Rank	Notes
"Non credo nei miracoli"	Laura Bono	Laura Bono; Mario Natale	1	Winner of the "Newcomers" section
"Che farò"	La Differenza	Fabio Falcone; Giuseppe Martinelli; Simone Zaccagna	2	
"L'immaginario"	Veronica Ventavoli	Diego Calvetti; Mario Ciappelli	3	
"Sono qui per questo"	Max De Angelis	Max De Angelis; Diego Calvetti; Mario Ciappelli	Eliminated	
"L'idea"	Equ	Gabriele Graziani; Vanni Crociani; Daniele Boscherini	Eliminated	
"Fammi respirare (aria)"	Giovanna D'Angi	Giovanni Caruso; Mario Pappalardo	Eliminated	
"Vorrei"	Sabrina Guida	Walter Esposito; Sabrina Guida; Roberto D'Aquino	Eliminated	
"Ci vuole k..."	Concido	Andrea & Enrico Plebani; Giorgio Tarantelli; Giorgio Costantini	Eliminated	
"Riesci a innamorarmi"	Modà	Francesco Silvestre	Eliminated	
"Dov'è la terra capitano?"	Enrico Boccadoro	Enrico Boccadoro	Eliminated	
"Segui il tuo cuore"	Christian Lo Zito	Giuseppe Furnari	Eliminated	
"Mentre tutto scorre"	Negramaro	Giuliano Sangiorgi	Eliminated	

== Musical guests ==
Guests
Artist(s)	Song(s)
Michael Bublé	"Feeling Good" "Home"
Lola Ponce	"Step"
Gwen Stefani	"Rich Girl"
Vasco Rossi	"Vita spericolata" "Un senso"
Povia	"I bambini fanno ooh..."
