= Francesco Renga =

Italian singer-songwriter

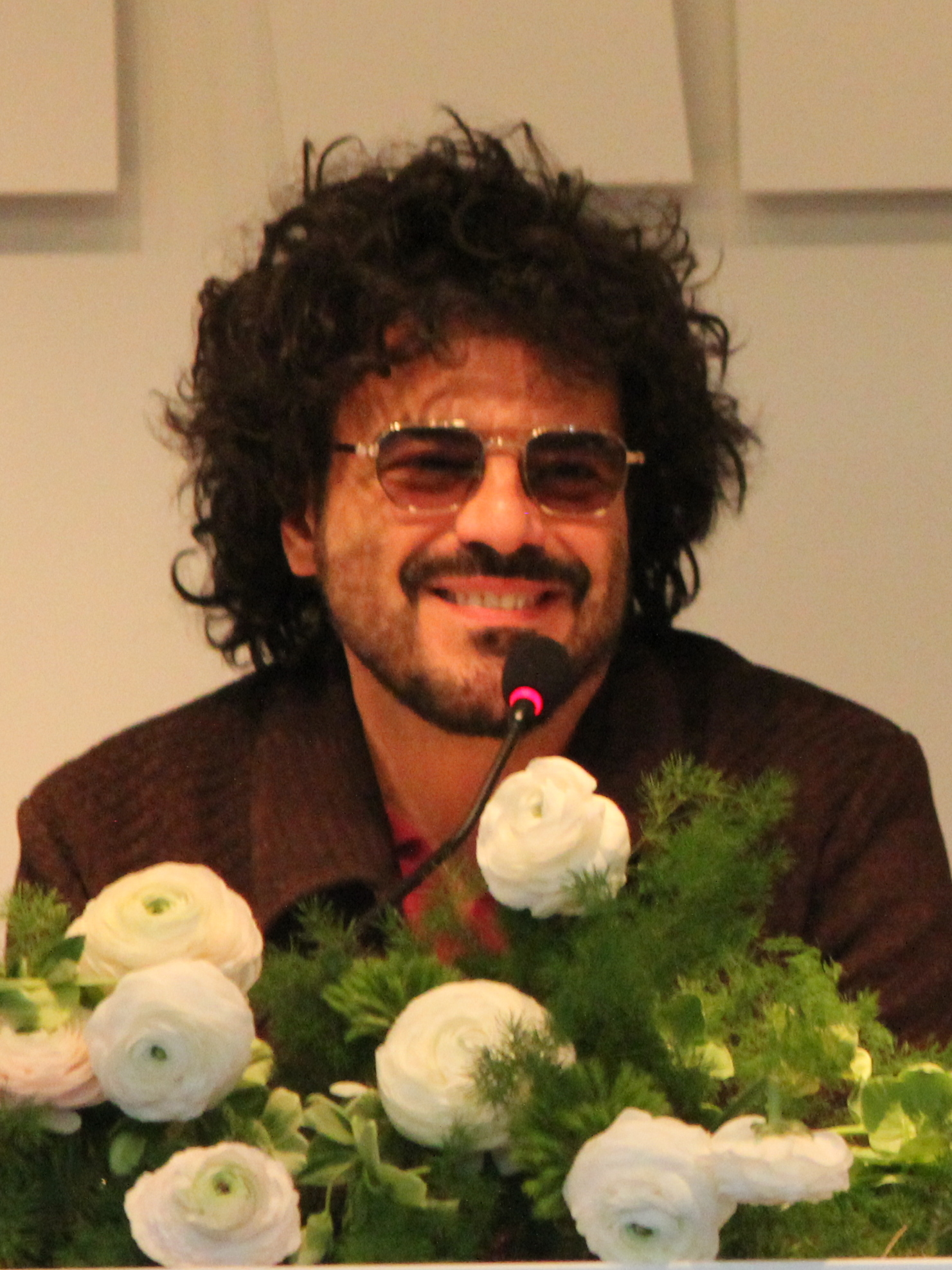
- Francesco Renga in February 2026

Background information
- Born: Pierfrancesco Renga; 12 June 1968 (age 57); Udine, Italy
- Origin: Brescia, Italy
- Genres: Pop rock
- Occupations: Singer; songwriter
- Years active: 1986–present
- Website: www.francescorenga.it

Pierfrancesco "Francesco" Renga (born 12 June 1968) is an Italian singer-songwriter. He won the Sanremo Music Festival 2005 with the song "Angelo", after winning the Mia Martini critics award at the 2001 Festival. He took part again in Sanremo in 2009 with "Uomo senza età", in 2012 with "La tua bellezza", in 2019 with "Aspetto che torni", in 2021 with "Quando trovo te", in 2024 (alongside Nek) with "Pazzo di te", and took part once more in the 2026 edition with "Il meglio di me", placing 23rd.

In 2010 he dedicated to his then longtime girlfriend Ambra Angiolini (2004–2015) the song "Stai con me", written by Emilio Munda.

== Discography ==
=== Albums ===
- 2001 Francesco Renga (ITA #46)
- 2002 Tracce (ITA #6 - Platinum 100,000+)
- 2004 Camere con vista (ITA #4 - 2× Platinum 200,000+)
- 2007 Ferro e cartone (ITA #1 - Platinum 120,000+)
- 2009 Orchestraevoce (ITA #7 - Platinum - 100,000+)
- 2010 Un giorno bellissimo (ITA #7 - Gold - 30,000+)
- 2012 Fermoimmagine (ITA #15)
- 2014 Tempo reale (ITA #1)
- 2016 Scriverò il tuo nome (ITA #1)
- 2019 L'altra metà (ITA #2)
