= A Maiden for a Prince =

- Italian film poster
- Directed by: Pasquale Festa Campanile
- Written by: Pasquale Festa Campanile; Ugo Liberatore
- Produced by: Mario Cecchi Gori
- Starring: Vittorio Gassman; Virna Lisi
- Cinematography: Roberto Gerardi
- Distributed by: Royal Films International
- Release date: 1966
- Running time: 92 minutes
- Language: Italian

A Maiden for a Prince (Italian: Una vergine per il principe) is a 1966 Italian comedy, starring Vittorio Gassman and Virna Lisi. It is based on the failed marriage between Margherita Farnese and Vincenzo Gonzaga.

== Cast ==
- Vittorio Gassman - Principe don Vincenzo Gonzaga
- Virna Lisi - Giulia
- Philippe Leroy - Ippolito
- Tino Buazzelli - Duca di Mantova
- Maria Grazia Buccella - Marchesa Clelia di Prepara
- Vittorio Caprioli - Marchese Lignio
- Paola Borboni - La signora
- Anna Maria Guarnieri - Margherita Farnese
- Giusi Raspani Dandolo - Duchessa di Mantova
- Luciano Mandolfo - Cardinale Farnese
