= Angelo (Francesco Renga song) =

Single by Francesco Renga

from the album Camere con vista (re-release)
- Released: 4 March 2005
- Genre: Pop rock
- Length: 3:25
- Label: Universal Music Group
- Songwriters: Francesco Renga; Maurizio Zappatini
- Producer: Umberto Iervolino

Francesco Renga singles chronology
"Meravigliosa (La luna)" (2004)	"Angelo" (2005)	"Un'ora in più" (2005)

Music video
- "Angelo" on YouTube

"Angelo" (transl. "Angel") is a 2005 song co-written and performed by Francesco Renga. It won the 55th edition of the Sanremo Music Festival.

== Composition ==
The lyrics represent a prayer directed to a celestial being, asking for protection from the afflictions of the world. According to Renga, the song was dedicated to his daughter Jolanda, and its lyrics were inspired by the 2004 Indian Ocean earthquake and tsunami.

== Track listing ==
No.	Title	Length
1.	"Angelo"	3:25
2.	"Angelo (...vorrei avere i tuoi angeli)"	3:28
3.	"Nel nome del padre"	3:41

== Charts ==
Chart (2010)	Peak position
Italy (FIMI)	1
Italy Airplay (Nielsen Music Control)	1

== Certifications ==
Region	Certification	Certified units/sales
Italy (FIMI) Sales and streaming since 2009	Gold	50,000^{‡}
^{‡} Sales+streaming figures based on certification alone.
