= Giusi Raspani Dandolo =

Italian actress

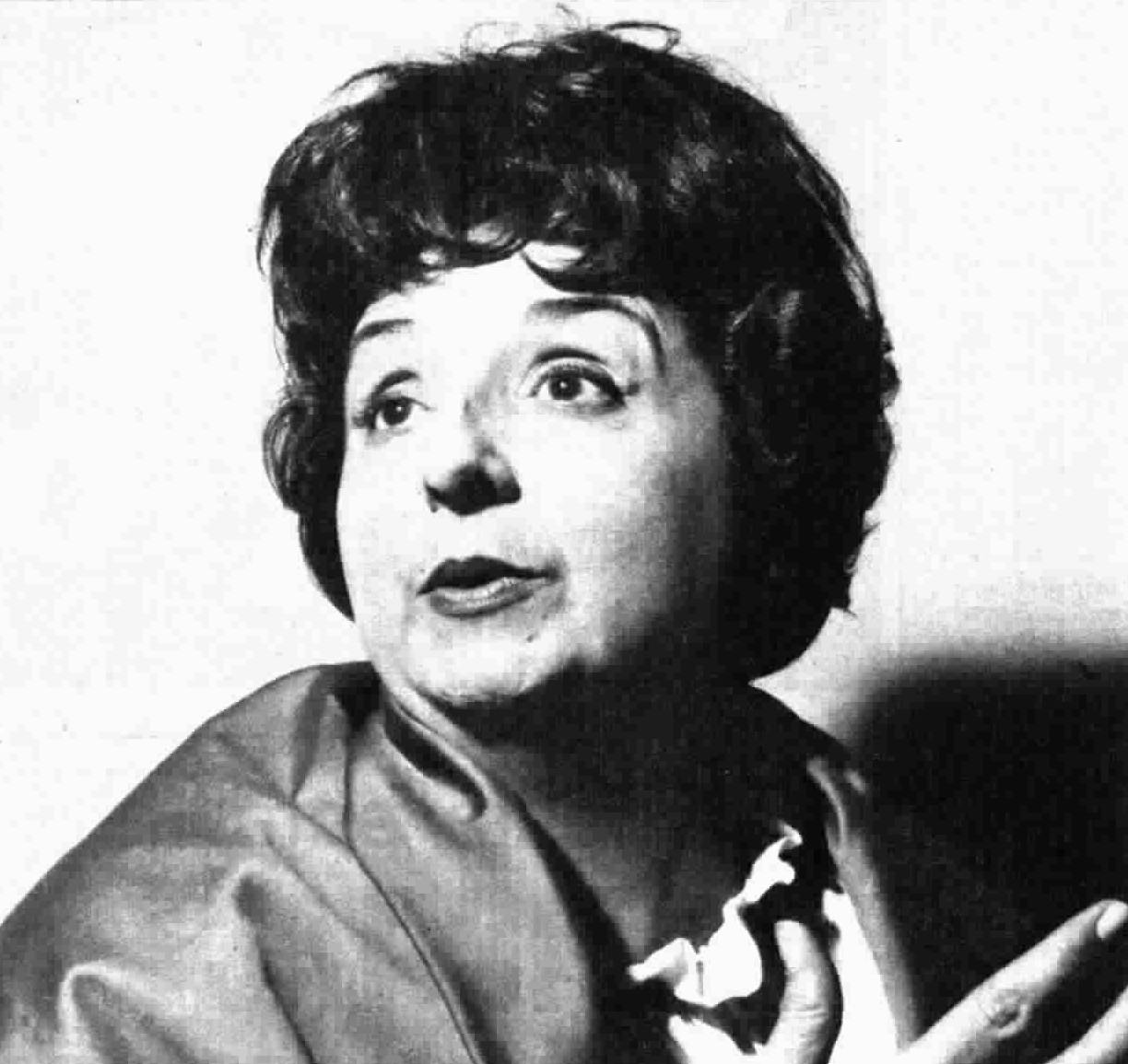
- Giusi Raspani Dandolo in Radiocorriere magazine, 1972
- Born: 23 August 1916; Trani, Italy
- Died: 14 January 2000 (aged 83); Rome, Italy
- Occupation: Actress

Giusi Raspani Dandolo (23 August 1916 – 14 January 2000) was an Italian stage, film, television and radio actress.

== Life and career ==
Born in Trani, the daughter of a magistrate, Raspani Dandolo enrolled at the Bolzano Conservatory as to become an opera singer, but eventually abandoned her studies to move to Rome, where in 1940, she graduated from the Accademia d'Arte Drammatica. She made her professional debut in 1941, with the stage company of Laura Adani. Mainly active on stage, she got critical acclaim for her performances at the Piccolo Teatro under the direction of Giorgio Strehler.

Typically cast in humorous roles, Raspani Dandolo was the recipient of a San Genesio Prize in 1964 for her performance in the comedy play La fastidiosa. She was also active in films, TV-series and on radio.

== Selected filmography ==
- The Steamship Owner (1951)
- Passionate Song (1953)
- The Letters Page (1955)
- Angel in a Taxi (1958)
- You're on Your Own (1959)
- Con rispetto parlando (1965)
- Rita the Mosquito (1966)
- A Maiden for a Prince (1966)
- Don't Sting the Mosquito (1967)
- Il lungo, il corto, il gatto (1967)
- La calandria (1972)
- Due cuori, una cappella (1975)
- Substitute Teacher (1975)
- Coeds (1976)
