= Che m'importa del mondo =

Single by Rita Pavone

from the album Non è facile avere 18 anni
- Language: Italian
- A-side: "Datemi un martello"
- Released: December 1963
- Genre: pop
- Length: 2 minutes
- Label: RCA Italiana
- Songwriter(s): Franco Migliacci; Luis Bacalov
- Producer(s): Luis Bacalov

Rita Pavone singles chronology
"Cuore" (1963)	"Che m'importa del mondo" (1963)	"Scrivi!" (1964)

"Che m'importa del mondo" (transl. "What do I care about the world") is a song notably performed by Rita Pavone, written by Franco Migliacci and Luis Bacalov. It was released as the B-side to "Datemi un martello".

== Track listing ==
No.	Title	Length
1.	"Datemi un martello"	2:40
2.	"Che m'importa del mondo"	2:23

== Charts ==
Chart (1964–1965)	Peak position
Chile (Billboard)	10
Italy (Musica e dischi)	1
Spain (AFYVE)	1
