= Rita the American Girl =

- Directed by: Piero Vivarelli
- Written by: Tito Carpi; Bruno Corbucci
- Produced by: Fabrizio Capucci
- Starring: Totò, Rita Pavone
- Cinematography: Emanuele Di Cora
- Edited by: Enzo Micarelli
- Music by: The Rokes: David Norman Shapiro
- Distributed by: Titanus
- Release date: 1965
- Running time: 101 minutes
- Country: Italy
- Language: Italian

Rita the American Girl (Italian: Rita, la figlia americana) is a 1965 Italian "musicarello" film directed by Piero Vivarelli with Totò and Rita Pavone.

== Plot ==
Professor Serafino Benvenuti (Totò) is a classical director of limited talents. He is dismayed at the growing popularity of beat music, which he hears daily from a youth club across the street (whose houseband is The Rokes). Hoping to pass on the classical tradition to the next generation, Benvenuti decides to adopt an orphaned child from Chile, who unexpectedly turns out to be the 18-year-old Rita d’Angelo (Rita Pavone). Rita, however, is more in-tune with the contemporary pop sounds of the day than the classical tradition of her adoptive father, leading to conflict.

== Cast ==
- Totò as Serafino Benvenuti
- Rita Pavone as Rita D'Angelo
- Fabrizio Capucci as Fabrizio Carli
- Lina Volonghi as Greta Wagner
- Umberto D'Orsi as Orazio
- Veronica as Diana
- Shel Shapiro (credited as David Norman Shapiro)
- Mike Shepstone
- Bobby Posner
- Johnny Charlton

== Bibliography ==
- Heide Fehrenbach & Uta G. Poiger. Transactions, Transgressions, Transformations: American Culture in Western Europe and Japan. Berghahn Books, 2000.
