= Petit Standard =

Studio album by Vesna Pisarović
- Released: 28 January 2019
- Recorded: 2018
- Genre: Jazz
- Length: 49:24
- Language: English
- Label: Jazzwerkstatt
- Producer: Vesna Pisarović

Vesna Pisarović chronology
Naša velika pjesmarica (2017)	Petit Standard (2019)	A Fish in My Pocket (2023)

Petit Standard is the eighth studio album and third jazz album by Croatian singer and songwriter Vesna Pisarović, globally released on 28 January 2019 by Jazzwerkstatt. The album includes collaborations with the three jazz musicians Joe Fonda, John Betsch and Gebhard Ullmann. The album features eleven cover versions of popular jazz songs originally performed by Steve Lacy, Charles Mingus and Mal Waldron.

== Background and recording ==
After her second jazz album Naša velika pjesmarica, Pisarović confirmed how she planned to release another jazz record before announcing her pop comeback. Prior to recording Petit Standard, Pisarović has been collaborating and performing with the Petit Standard Trio. Throughout 2014 and 2016 Pisarović performed songs from Petit Standard live before recording them in 2018. According to Pisarović, nearly all of the songs were recorded in one take. The album was made in a studio in Bruxelles, which was reserved for two days, but all 11 songs were recorded in the first day.

Pisarović described the album as an "atypical romantic homage to everything that's small and sweet".

A German tour to promote the album was scheduled in 2020 but got cancelled due to the COVID-19 pandemic. A new tour to promote the album has been scheduled for October 2022.

== Track listing ==
Credits adapted from AllMusic.

Petit Standard
No.	Title	Writer(s)	Length
1.	"Hooray for Herbie"	Wayne Carson, Johnny Christopher, Mark James	5:00
2.	"The Man I Love"	George Gershwin, Ira Gershwin	4:55
3.	"Morning Joy"	Bob Kaufman, Steve Lacy	6:10
4.	"Peggy's Blue Skylight"	Charles Mingus, Steve Provizer	6:36
5.	"Lonely Woman"	Margo Guryan, Ornette Coleman	5:40
6.	"Prospectus"	Blaise Cendrars, Steve Lacy	6:29
7.	"A Flower Is a Lovesome Thing"	Billy Strayhorn	6:43
8.	"Jitterbug Waltz"	Fats Waller	4:36
9.	"Ladies in Mercedes"	Norma Winstone, Steve Swallow	4:24
10.	"Art"	Herman Melville, Steve Lacy	5:18
11.	"Honeysuckle Rose"	Andy Razaf, Fats Waller	6:13

== Personnel ==
Credits adapted from Amazon Music.

=== Musicians ===
- Vesna Pisarović – vocals
- Joe Fonda – double bass
- John Betsch – drums
- Gebhard Ullmann – tenor saxophone, bass clarinet

=== Technical ===
- Vesna Pisarović – producer
- Ulli Blobel - executive production
- Adrian von Ripka - mixing, mastering

=== Artwork ===
- Hrvoje Zalukar - photography
- Herbert Weisrock - creative direction, design, layout

== Release history ==
Region	Date	Format	Label	Ref.
Various	28 January 2019	digital download; streaming	Jazzwerkstatt	
Various	2 February 2019	CD	Jazzwerkstatt	
