= Federica Felini =

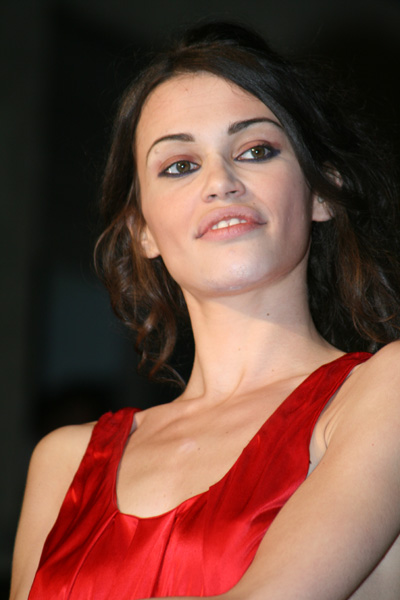
- Federica Felini (2007)
- Born: 13 April 1983 (age 43); Lodi, Italy
- Occupation: Model

Federica Felini (born 13 April 1983) is an Italian model, singer and television personality. Felini has modelled for Guess and has hosted the Sanremo Music Festival in 2005. She has also done a duet song with Italian rapper Vacca.

== Biography ==
She began working as a model in Milan, before becoming the star of Guess worldwide campaign.

A few months later she recorded the single Je t'aime, which was chosen by Citroën as the soundtrack for the Citroën C1 commercial and entered the charts in Italy, France and Belgium. She also has a duet to her credit entitled Don't Trust You.
