= Hit Records (Croatia) =

Hit Records d.o.o.
- Founded: April 1, 2003
- Founder: Miroslav Rus
- Country of origin: Croatia
- Location: Zagreb, Radnička cesta 54
- Official website: www.hitrecords.hr

Hit Records is a Croatian record label based in Zagreb. Hit Records is a member of the IFPI (International Federation of the Phonographic Industry), which represents the music industry worldwide with some 1,400 members in 66 countries and affiliated industry associations in 45 countries.

Signed artists include Tony Cetinski, ITD Band, Ivan Zak, Zdravko Čolić, Neda Ukraden, Halid Bešlić, Hari Mata Hari, Toše Proeski, Prljavo kazalište, Kaliopi, Doris Dragović, Zorica Kondža, Klapa Rišpet, Hari Rončević, Sandi Cenov, Giuliano, David Temelkov, Marko Kutlić, Jure Brkljača, Dženan Lončarević, Željko Samardžić, Haris Džinović, Saša Matić, Klapa Kampanel, Baruni, Učiteljice, Blanka Došen, Ivana Marić, Leo, Josip Joop, Zoran Jelenković, Katarina Rautek, Robert Čolina, Alka Vuica, Cecilija, Tamburaški sastav Dyaco, Klapa Friži, Boris Režak, Bojan Marović, Armin, Željko Krušlin & Latino, Alen Vitasović, Kristijan Rahimovski, Marina Tomašević, Boris Rogoznica, Petar Dragojević, Lsuha, Marijan Monić, Stela, Jakov Mađarić, Elvis Sršen NoA, Romana Lalić Pejković, Sanella, Lovro Krovina, Dino Bogović, Lara Demarin, Vesna Pisarović, grupa Ruswaj, Magdalena Bogić, Mirka.

== Sources ==
- Artists (in Croatian)
