= Vesna Pisarović =

Croatian pop and jazz singer (born 1978)

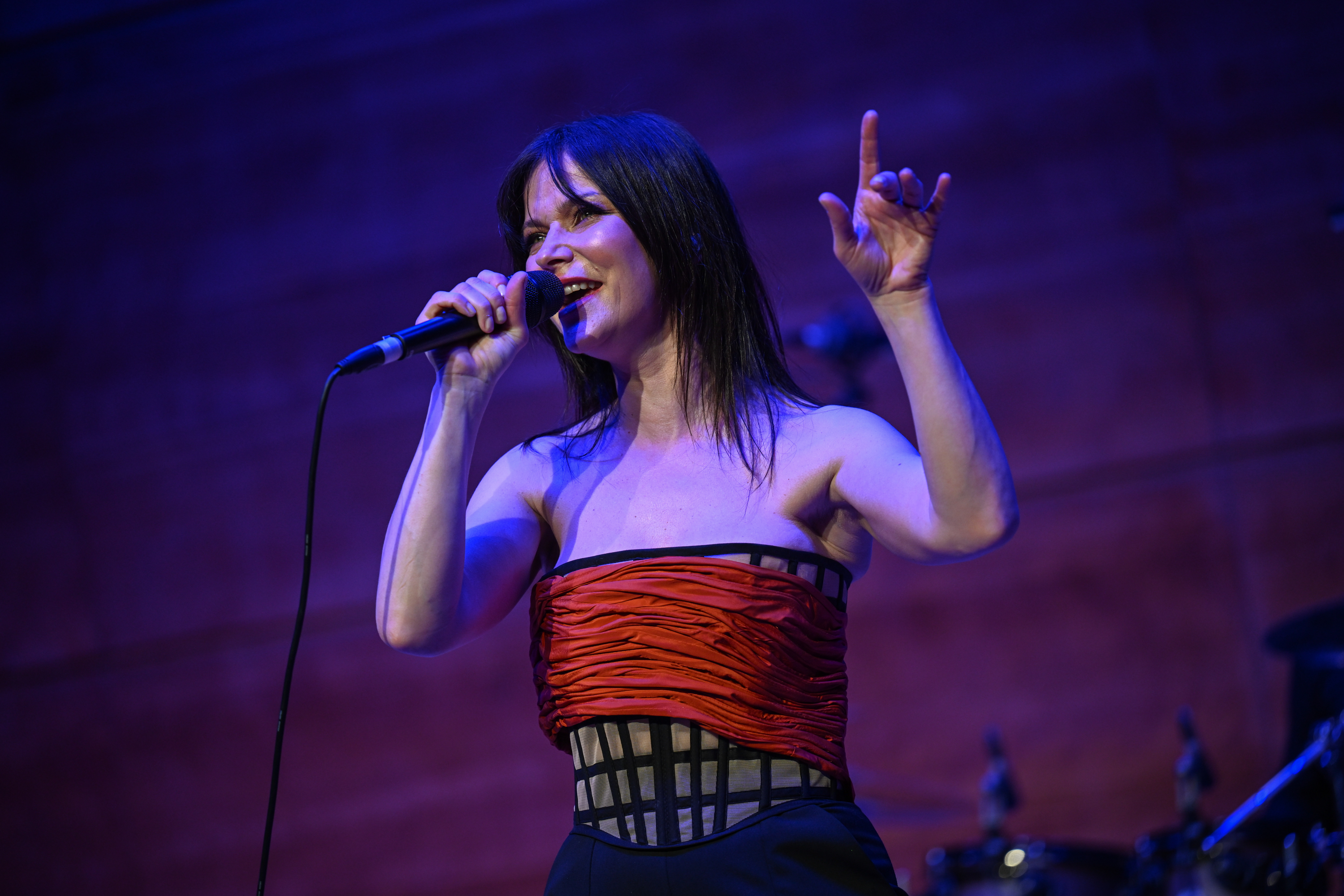
- Pisarović during a concert in Skopje, 2026

Background information
- Born: Vesna Pisarović; 9 April 1978 (age 48); Brčko, SR Bosnia and Herzegovina, SFR Yugoslavia
- Genres: Pop, Teen pop 1997–2006; Jazz 2012–present
- Occupations: Singer, songwriter
- Instruments: Piano, Vocal
- Years active: 1997–present
- Spouse: Ozren Pupovac (m. 2009)

Vesna Pisarović (born 9 April 1978) is a Croatian pop and jazz singer.

== Life and career ==
=== 1978–1999: Early life ===
Pisarović was born in Brčko, SR Bosnia and Herzegovina, Yugoslavia and grew up in Požega, Croatia. Through her mother, she has some German ancestry. From her earliest childhood she attended a music school, where she played the flute, sang in choirs and participated in various music contests.

In the mid-1990s she moved to Zagreb, Croatia, where she graduated from the Faculty of Humanities and Social Sciences. She began singing in clubs and writing songs. In 1997, while performing at the Croatian festival Zadarfest, she met Milana Vlaović, a journalist and composer. Vlaović later started to write songs for Pisarović.

=== 2000–2002: Breakthrough and the Eurovision Song Contest ===
In 2002 Vesna Pisarović won the annual Dora festival, the event that determines Croatia's entry for the Eurovision Song Contest. Her song "Everything I Want" placed 11th in the Eurovision Song Contest 2002. She wrote the song "In the Disco" for the Bosnian vocalist Deen, which represented Bosnia and Herzegovina at the Eurovision Song Contest 2004.

=== 2016–2019: Naša velika pjesmarica and Petit Standard ===
Pisarović's eighth studio and third jazz album, Petit Standard, was released in March 2019 through the German jazz label Jazzwerkstatt. She embarked on her Petit Standard Tour later in July.

=== 2020–present: Upcoming tenth studio album ===
On 5 October 2019 in an interview with Narodni radio Pisarović revealed that she has been working on her upcoming pop album since 2006. Since then she has written over 30 songs. The recording process for the album started in early 2020. On 13 February 2021, Pisarović performed a medley during the show program at Dora 2021. In August 2021 in an interview with Slobodna Dalmacija, Pisarović revealed how she has "two thousand music sheets of new music" that she has written in the past few years. She also noted how the album is in the works but not yet ready to be announced. Pisarović's major comeback concert with her mainstream repertoire was supposed to be held in 2020 but was rescheduled multiple times because of the COVID-19 pandemic. In early 2022 the concert was confirmed to be held at the Dom Sportova in Zagreb on 29 April 2022. In May 2022, Pisarović released a remixed version of "Neka ljudi govore" with newly recorded vocals. In June 2024, Pisarović announced that the lead single from her upcoming ninth studio album will be released on 1 September 2024. A month later, in July 2024, Bravo! announced her headlining concert at the Arena Zagreb on 26 April 2025.

== Discography ==
- Da znaš (2000)
- Za tebe stvorena (2001)
- Kao da je vrijeme... (2002)
- Pjesma mi je sve (2003)
- Peti (2005)
- With Suspicious Minds (2012)
- Naša velika pjesmarica (2016)
- Petit Standard (2019)
- Poravna (2025)

== Awards and nominations ==
Year	Association	Category	Nominee / work	Result	Ref.
2001	Porin	Best New Artist	Da znaš	Nominated	
2018	Porin	Parlour Album of the Year	Naša velika pjesmarica	Nominated	

Achievements
Preceded by Vanna with Strings of My Heart	Croatia in the Eurovision Song Contest; 2002	Succeeded by Claudia Beni with Više nisam tvoja
