= Ugo Fangareggi =

Italian actor and voice actor

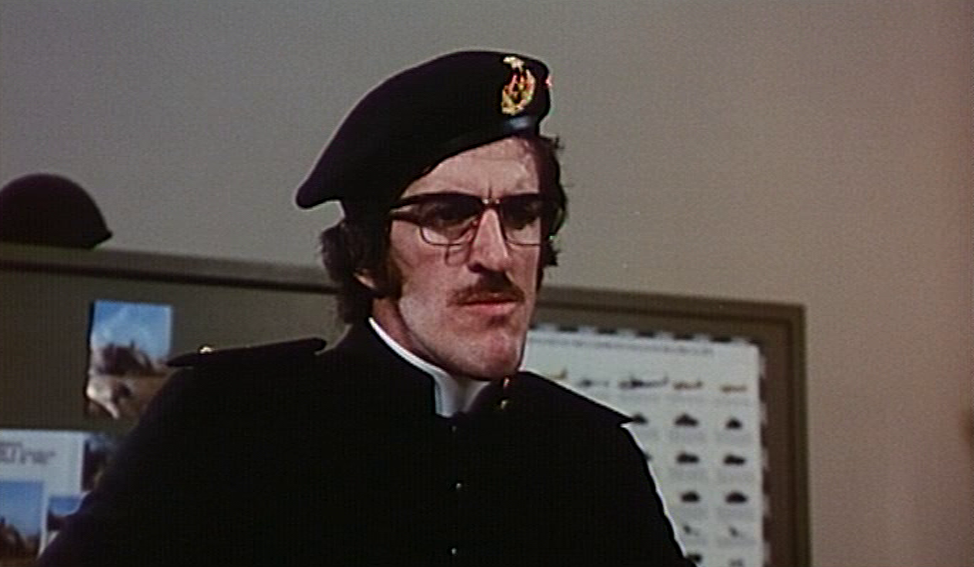
- Born: 30 January 1938; Genoa, Italy
- Died: 20 October 2017 (aged 79); Rome, Italy
- Occupation: Actor

Ugo Fangareggi (30 January 1938 – 20 October 2017) was an Italian actor.

== Life and career ==
Born in Genoa, Fangareggi worked as a dental technician when in 1961 he was noticed by Luigi Squarzina who chose him to act in the play Ciascuno a suo modo.

He later moved to Rome to devote himself to a professional acting career and in a short time he became one of the most active character actors in Italian cinema. Mainly devoted to humorous roles, he is best known for the role of Mangold in Mario Monicelli's For Love and Gold. Fangareggi was also active in several successful TV series.

On 20 October 2017, Fangareggi died in Rome after a lengthy battle with Parkinson's disease, aged 79.
