= Bruno Canfora =

Italian composer, conductor, and music arranger

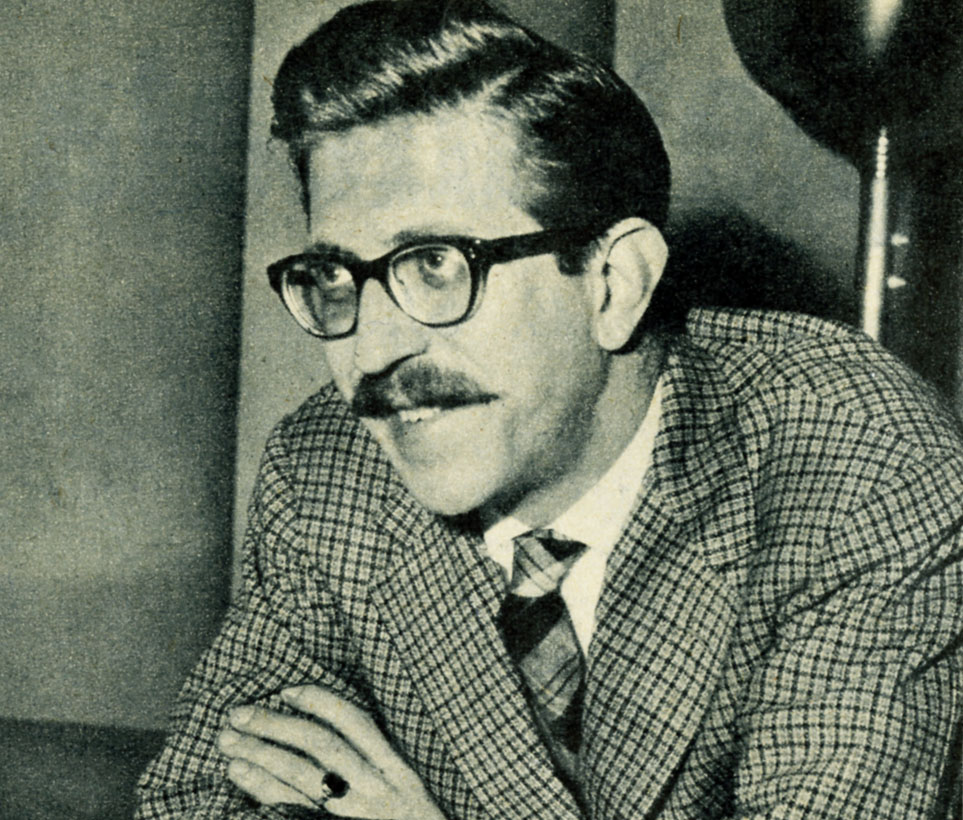
- Bruno Canfora in 1955
- Born: 6 November 1924; Milan, Italy
- Died: 4 August 2017 (aged 92); Piegaro, Italy
- Occupation: Composer

Bruno Canfora (Italian pronunciation: [ˈbruːno ˈkaɱfora]; 6 November 1924 – 4 August 2017) was an Italian composer, conductor, and music arranger.

== Life and career ==
Born in Milan, Canfora studied piano at an early age, then studied oboe at the Giuseppe Verdi Conservatory in Milan. During the Second World War, he played several concerts with his group in Trieste. After the war, he moved to Turin and became conductor of the Castellino Danze Orchestra.

Besides having composed scores for television programs and films, Canfora is known for his work in pop music, particularly for his collaboration with Mina, for whom he composed songs like "Brava", "Un bacio è troppo poco", "Mi sei scoppiato dentro il cuore", "Sono come tu mi vuoi" and "Vorrei che fosse amore" (the latter two were also translated into other languages like Spanish, the latter also in French). In the 60's, he toured with Mina in Japan and wrote a hit for her in that country: "Anata To Watashi".

He also composed songs for Rita Pavone, Ornella Vanoni, Shirley Bassey, and the Kessler Twins. The Sanremo festival song "La Vita" was brought to international success by and became the signature song for Shirley Bassey as "This Is My Life".

Canfora was the conductor for the Sanremo Music Festival in 1961, 1988 and 1993. In the Eurovision Song Contest, he was the musical director in the 1991 contest that was held in Rome, Italy. He conducted the Italian home entry "Comme è ddoce 'o mare" by Peppino di Capri.

Canfora died on 4 August 2017 in Piegaro, Italy at the age of 92.

== Selected filmography ==
- The Man Who Wagged His Tail (1957)
- It Happened in Broad Daylight (1958)
- Wolves of the Deep (1959)
- The Huns (1960)
- Fall of the Mohicans (1965)
- Rita the Mosquito (1966)
- Il vostro super agente Flit (1966)
- James Tont operazione D.U.E. (1966)
- Don't Sting the Mosquito (1967)
- The Funny Face of the Godfather (1973)
- Free Hand for a Tough Cop (1976)
- Destruction Force (1977)

Preceded by (Socialist Federal Republic of Yugoslavia) Igor Kuljerić	Eurovision Song Contest conductor 1991	Succeeded by (Sweden) Anders Berglund
