= Carlo Rossi (lyricist) =

Italian lyricist and record producer

- Born: 27 November 1920; Rome, Italy
- Died: 16 May 1989 (aged 68); Rome, Italy
- Occupations: Lyricist; Record producer

Carlo Rossi (27 November 1920 – 16 May 1989) was an Italian lyricist and record producer.

Born in Rome, Rossi started his career as a writer of humorous poems and short stories. He entered the music industry as the lyricist of the songs composed by Edoardo Vianello, many of which became classics in Italy. He also wrote songs for other singers, including Rita Pavone, Massimo Ranieri, Paul Anka and Alunni del Sole.
