= Edoardo Vianello =

Italian singer, composer and actor

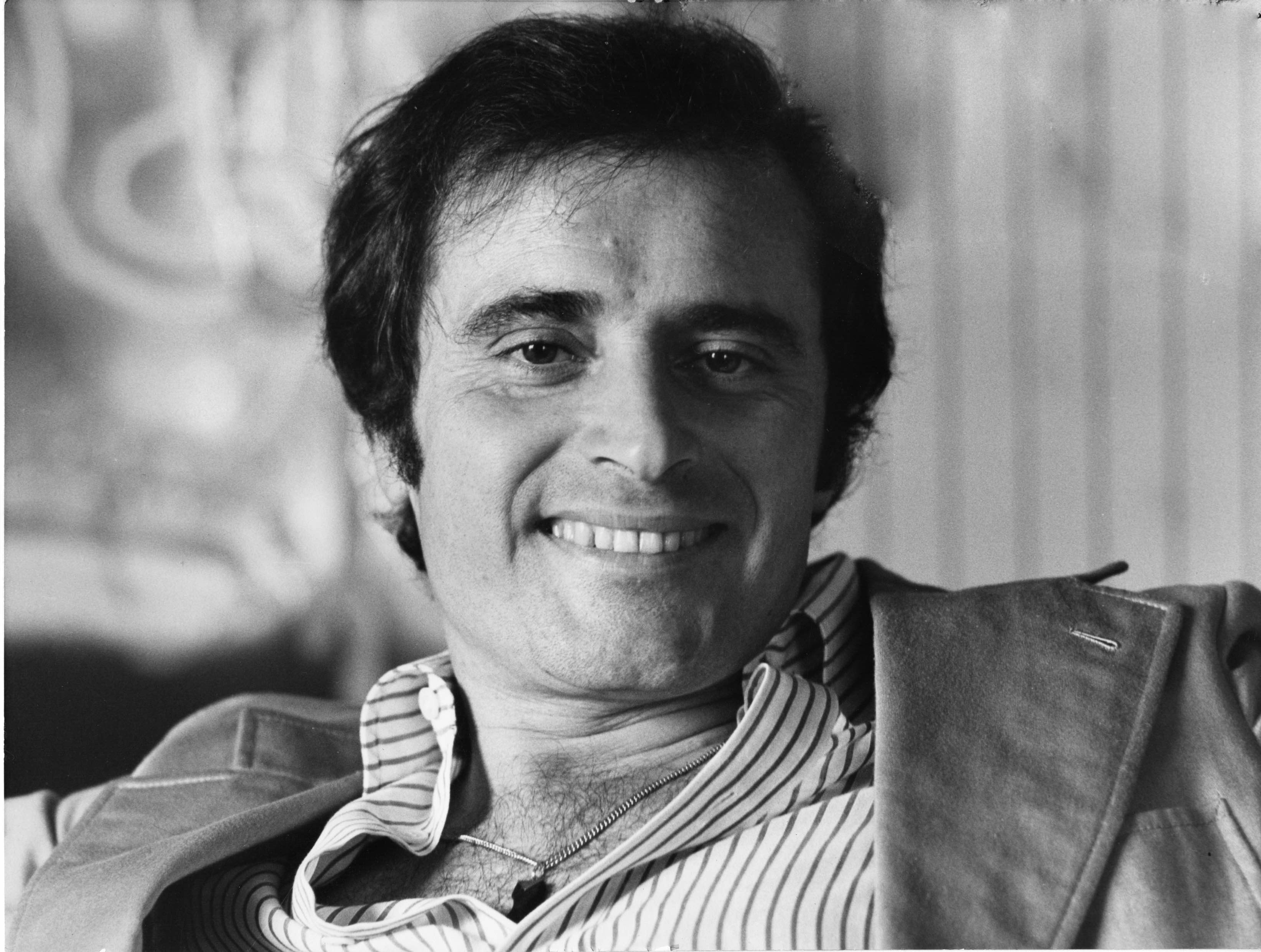
- Vianello in the 1970s
- Born: 24 June 1938 (age 88); Rome, Kingdom of Italy
- Occupations: Singer, composer, actor
- Years active: 1956–present
- Height: 1.65 m (5 ft 5 in)
- Spouses: Wilma Goich (m. 1967; div. 1981) Vania Muccioli (m. 1991; div. 1998) Elfrida Ismolli (m. 2006)
- Children: 2

Edoardo Vianello (born 24 June 1938) is an Italian singer, composer and actor, considered one of the most popular Italian singers of the 1960s.

== Career ==
Born in Rome, Vianello started his career in 1956. His first successes came in 1961, with "Il capello" ("The Hair") and "Pinne fucile ed occhiali" ("Fins, rifle, and glasses"), which both charted up to the 2nd position in the Italian Hit Parade.

Vianello had several successes in the 1960s, such as "Guarda come dondolo" ("Watch How I swing"), "Abbronzatissima" ("Very Tanned"), "O mio signore" ("Oh My Lord") which topped the charts, and "I Watussi" which went up to 3rd. After a less successful period, he re-launched his career in the 1970s, founding the duo Vianella with his wife Wilma Goich. Their main hit of the period was "Semo gente de borgata" ("We Are People from a Small Town") that reached #7. In the late 1970s, he reprised his solo career.

As of 2006, songs of Vianello were included in the soundtracks of 64 films while the Italian rights-collecting agency SIAE estimates sales of over 65 million Vianello records worldwide.
