= Rita Pavone =

Italian-Swiss actress and singer (born 1945)

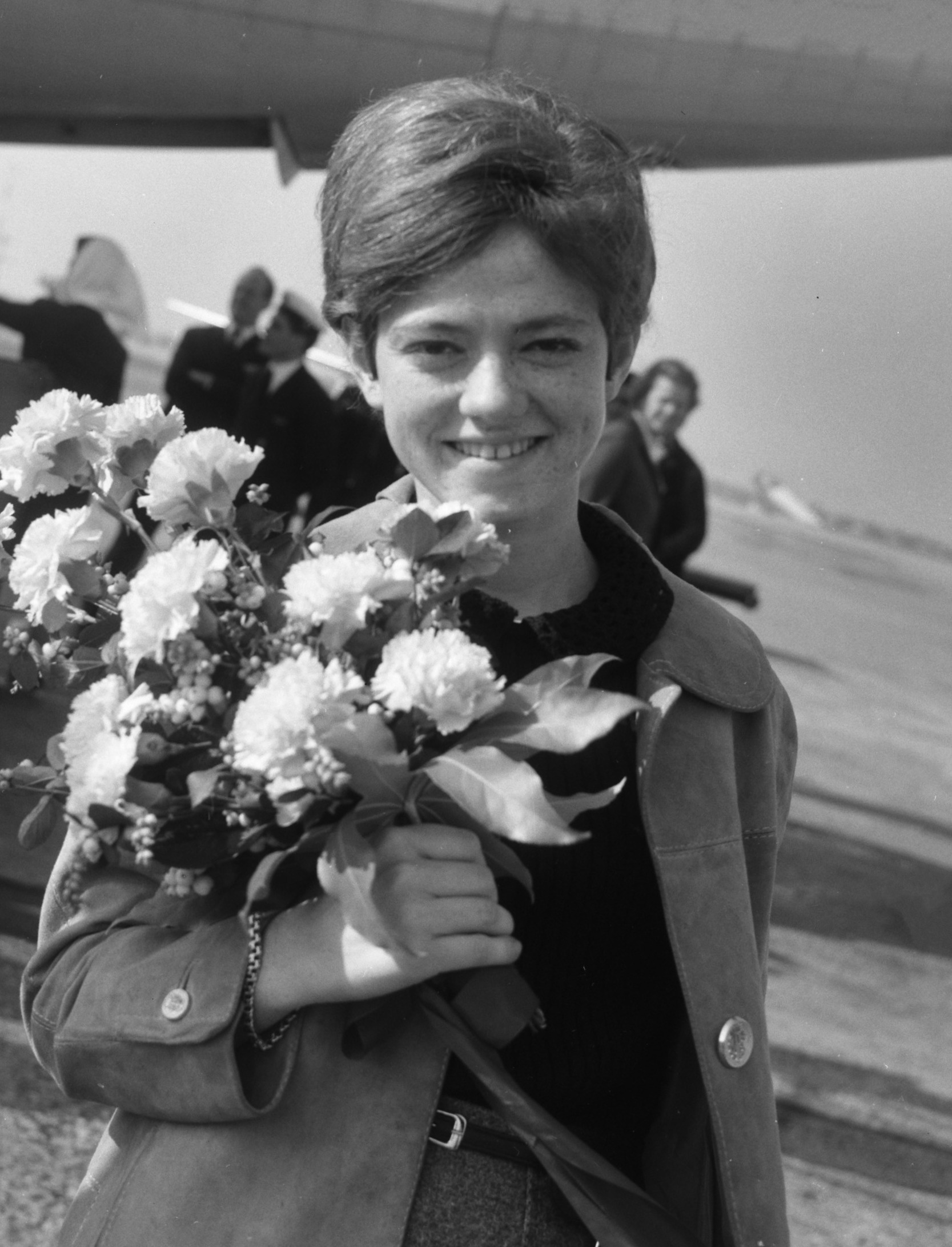
- Pavone in 1965
- Born: Rita Ori Filomena Pavone; August 23, 1945 (age 81); Turin, Piedmont, Kingdom of Italy
- Citizenship: Italy; Switzerland
- Occupations: Singer; actress
- Years active: 1962–present
- Spouse: Teddy Reno (m. 1968)
- Children: 2
- Website: www.ritapavone.it

Rita Ori Filomena Merk-Pavone (née Pavone, Italian: [ˈriːta paˈvoːne]; born August 23, 1945) is an Italian-Swiss pop singer, actress and showgirl, who rose to prominence in the 1960s.

Known as "the Mosquito of Turin" (la Zanzara di Torino), she was also nicknamed "Carrot Hair" (Pel di carota) because of the red color of her hair. Selling more than 50 million records worldwide and recording in seven different languages, she is also one of eight Italian pop singers to have ever entered the UK charts.

== Career ==
Pavone was born in Turin, in the region of Piedmont. In 1962 she participated in, and won, the first Festival degli Sconosciuti ("Festival of the Unknown"), a song competition for amateur artists. Her self-titled 1963 album, led by the hit single "La partita di pallone" ("The Soccer Game") brought her widespread recognition in Italy at age 17 and later international visibility. "La partita di pallone" sold over one million copies and was awarded a gold disc. Her recording of "Cuore" ("Heart") also sold a million copies in 1963 and spent nine weeks at number one in Italy.

Pavone made her first appearance on The Ed Sullivan Show May 17, 1964, and she became a frequent musical guest there until 1970. In the summer of 1964, she had chart success in North America with a single "Remember Me", sung in English, backed with "Just Once More" (#13 Canada). The song reached number 26 in the United States and number 16 in Canada. In Canada, another single, "Wait for Me", reached number 33 in October 1964.

She became popular among Spanish youth audiences, and a 2005 Spanish television documentary described her success there as uncommon for a foreign singer.

In the United States, she performed on programs that also featured artists such as Diana Ross and The Supremes, Ella Fitzgerald, Tom Jones, Duke Ellington, and Paul Anka. She also sang at Carnegie Hall in New York City.

Returning to Italy, Pavone made her acting debut, working in five films and participating in shows such as Il Giornalino di Gian Burrasca (a children's TV show), Alta pressione ("High Pressure"), Stasera Rita ("Tonight Rita"), and the variety show Studio Uno. In 1982, she participated in Come Alice ("Like Alice"), which became a hit on Italian television.

Rita Pavone starred in six movies during the 1960s: Clémentine chérie (1963), Rita the American Girl (1965), Rita la zanzara (1966), Non stuzzicate la zanzara (1967), Little Rita nel West (1967), and La Feldmarescialla (1968). The two "Zanzara" movies and the Il Giornalino di Gian Burrasca were directed by Lina Wertmüller. Although her movie career was aimed at a teen audience, her films have since attracted a small following, today her films have found a cult niche.

Pavone was also popular in the UK during 1966 and 1967. RCA Victor issued two of her singles; in quick succession both were hits, "Heart" peaking at number 27 and "You Only You" peaking at number 21 in the UK Singles Chart. During this period, she performed at venues including the London Palladium. She also recorded Andrew Lloyd Webber's "Try It and See", which later became "King Herod's Song" in the rock opera Jesus Christ Superstar.

In 1968, Pavone married Teddy Reno in Switzerland. He was her talent scout and the organizer of the first song contest she won, but their marriage attracted media attention in Italy because Reno was still legally married, and divorce was not yet permitted until 1970. They remarried in Italy in 1971 and had two sons: Alessandro in 1969 and Giorgio in 1974.

During the 1980s, Pavone acted in comedy films including 2 sul pianerottolo, Risate in salotto and Santarellina.

In 1992, Pavone returned to the United States, where she sang during a multiple-artist concert that included Whitney Houston, Frank Sinatra, the Bolshoi Ballet, and Cher at the Sands hotel in Atlantic City. She then turned to theater acting and participated in a William Shakespeare play. In 2002 she gave a concert at Miami's Dade Auditorium.

The main character in the Argentinian film Nine Queens tries to remember the tune of a Rita Pavone song throughout the story; the song "Il ballo del mattone" plays as the end credits run.

Pavone was a Senate candidate in the Italian general election of 2006. She participated as candidate for Per l'Italia nel mondo ("For Italy in the World"), a centre-right list led by minister Mirko Tremaglia.

She participated at the Sanremo Music Festival 2020 with the song "Niente (Resilienza 74)".

Pavone and her husband Reno now live in Ticino, Switzerland. Their elder son Alessandro is a radio show host, and their younger son Giorgio is a rock singer.

== Appearances at the Sanremo Music Festival ==
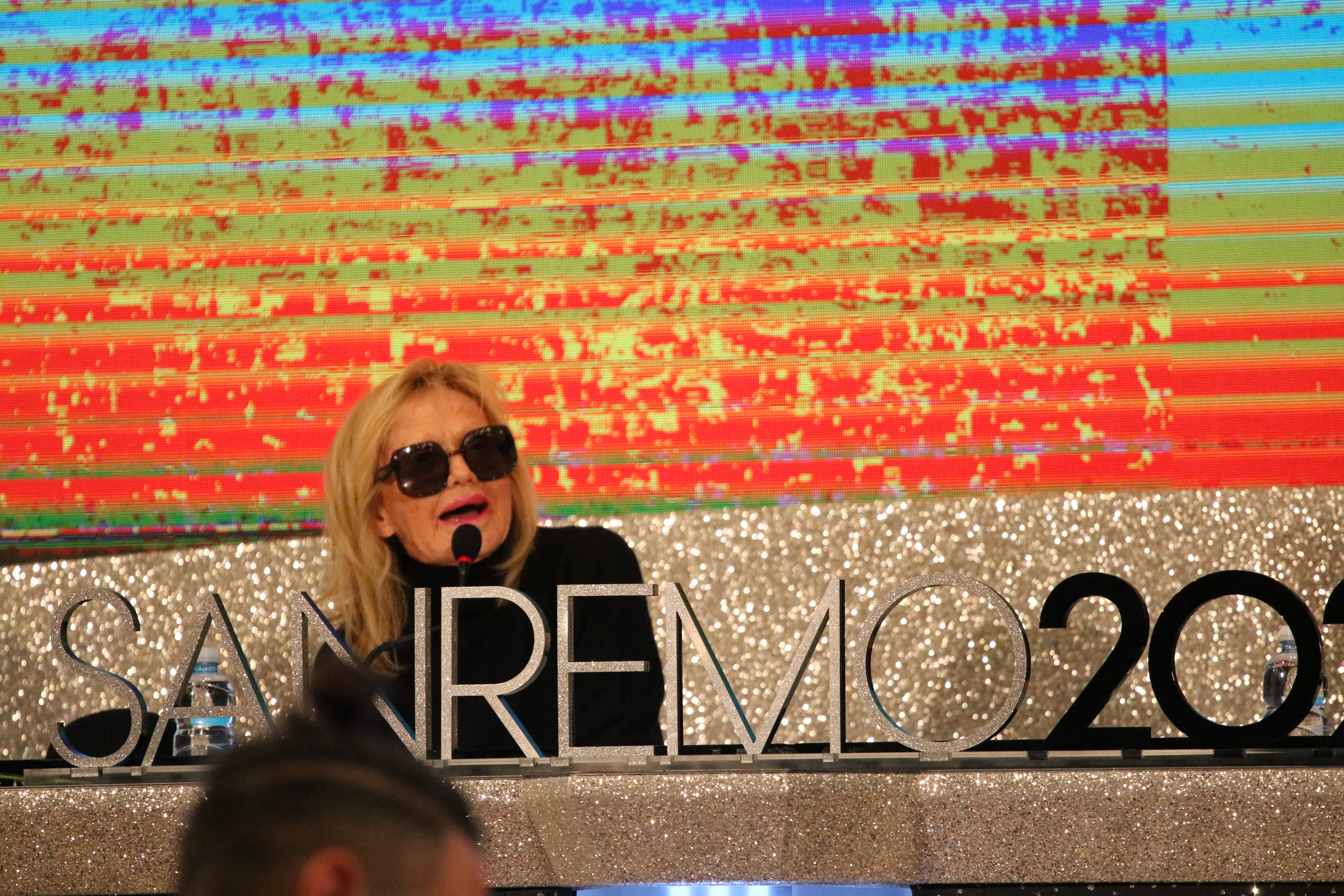
Pavone at a press conference during Sanremo 2020

Year	Category	Song	Placement	Partner
1969	—N/a	"Zucchero"	13th	Dik Dik
1970	—N/a	"Ahi ahi ragazzo!"	Non-finalist	Valeria Mongardini
1972	—N/a	"Amici mai"	Non-finalist	—N/a
2020	Campioni	"Niente (Resilienza 74)"	17th	—N/a

=== Appearances as guest ===
Year	Artists	Song	Author
2005	Toto Cutugno and Annalisa Minetti	"Come noi nessuno al mondo"	S. Cutugno

== Discography ==
Pavone mainly recorded for RCA Victor until 1968, then signed briefly with Ricordi, which launched her vanity label RitaLand. She eventually returned to RCA Victor and recorded three more albums with the label. She also recorded a French language album with Phillips.

=== Italian discography ===
- Rita Pavone (1963, re-released on CD in 2003)
- Non è facile avere 18 anni (1964)
- Il Giornalino di Gian Burrasca (1965)
- Stasera Rita (1965)
- È nata una stella (1966, compilation)
- Ci vuole poco (1967)
- Little Rita nel West (1968)
- Rita 70
- Viaggio a Ritaland (1970)
- Gli italiani vogliono cantare (1972)
- Rita ed io (1976)
- R.P. (1980)
- Gemma e le altre (1989)
- Masters (2013)

=== U.S. discography ===
- Rita Pavone – The International Teenage Sensation (1964)
- Small Wonder (1964)
- This Is Rita Pavone (1965)

=== French discography ===
- Dame Baby Poupée Philips – 9101 209 (1979)

=== RCA singles (1963–1970) ===
- "La partita di pallone" / "Amore twist" (1963)
- "Come te non c'è nessuno" / "Clémentine chérie" (1963)
- "Alla mia età" / "Pel di carota"
- "Cuore" / "Il ballo del mattone" (1963)
- "Non è facile avere 18 anni" / "Son finite le vacanze" (1964)
- "Che m'importa del mondo" / "Datemi un martello" (1964)
- "Scrivi" / "Ti vorrei parlare" (1964)
- "L'amore mio" / "San Francesco" (1964)
- "Viva la pappa col pomodoro" / "Sei la mamma" (1965)
- "Lui" / "La forza di lasciarti" (1965)
- "Il plip" / "Supercalifragilispiespiralidoso" (1965)
- "Stasera con te" / "Solo tu" (1965)
- "Il geghegè" / "Qui ritornerà" (1965)
- "Fortissimo" / La sai troppo lunga" (1966)
- "Mamma dammi la panna" / "Col chicco" (1966)
- "La zanzara" / "Perché due non fa tre" (1966)
- "Dove non so" / "Gira gira" (1967)
- "Una notte intera" / "Questo nostro amore" (1967)
- "I tre porcellini" / "Con un poco di zucchero" (1967)
- "Non dimenticar le mie parole" / "Da cosa nasce cosa" (1967)
- "Tu sei come" / "Ma che te ne fai" (1968)
- "Zucchero" (1969)
- "Ahi, ahi ragazzo" (1970)

== Filmography ==
Films
Title	Year	Role
Rita the American Girl	1965	Rita Benvenuti
Rita the Mosquito	1966	Rita Santangelo
Don't Sting the Mosquito	1967	Rita Santangelo
Rita of the West	1967	Little Rita
The Crazy Kids of the War	1967	Rita
Due sul pianerottolo	1976	Mimma Castigliano
