= Teddy Reno =

Italian singer, record producer and actor (born 1926)

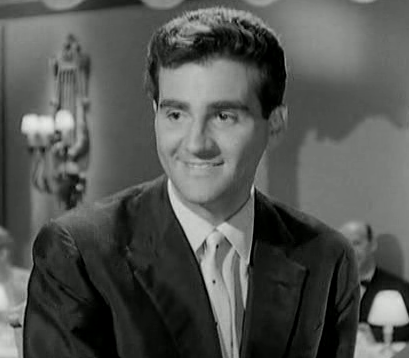
- Reno in 1957
- Born: Ferruccio Merk Ricordi; 11 July 1926 (age 100); Trieste, Friuli-Venezia Giulia, Kingdom of Italy
- Citizenship: Italy; Switzerland
- Occupations: Singer; songwriter; actor; record produce/record company founder
- Years active: 1945–1975, 2007–2016
- Spouse: Rita Pavone (m. 1968)
- Children: 2

Teddy Reno (born Ferruccio Merk Ricordi; 11 July 1926), is an Italian retired singer, songwriter, actor, record company founder and producer and talent manager. He appeared in several films in the 1950's and 1960's

== Biography ==
=== Early life ===
Reno was born Ferruccio Merk Ricordi in Trieste, Italy to a father of Austrian origin and an Italian Jewish mother, he made his debut on Radio Trieste during the Anglo-American administration of the city, launching the song "Eterno ritornello (Te vojo ben)".

=== Professional music career ===
Reno, adapted his stage name when touring Germany in 1946 aged 20, when he entered as a singer the orchestra of British band leader Teddy Foster, with whom he toured across Europe and North Africa.

In 1948, he founded one of Italy's first record companies, CGD (i.e. Compagnia Generale del Disco), which he later sold to Ladislao Sugar a publisher of Hungarian origin and future owner of the Sugar Group.

He enjoyed a great degree of success as a singer in the 1950s. In the 1960s, he focused his career on discovering and producing new talents, mainly through the Festival degli sconosciuti (Festival of the Unknowns) which he created in 1961. Some of Reno's discoveries at the Festival include pop rock group The Rokes and singers Dino and Rita Pavone, whom he married in 1968.

Reno was also active as a film and stage actor and a television and radio presenter. Since 1968, he and his wife Rita Pavone have lived in Ticino, Switzerland.

== Filmography ==
- Toto, Vittorio e La dottoressa - Directored by Camillo Mastrocinque (1957)
- Peppino, le modelle e... "Chella Ila"- Directored by Mario Mattoli (1957)
- Toto, Peppino e fuorilegge (1956)
- Toto, Peppino e la... malafemmina (1956)
- Destinazione Sanremo (1959)

(source:TMDB)
